= Ben Howard discography =

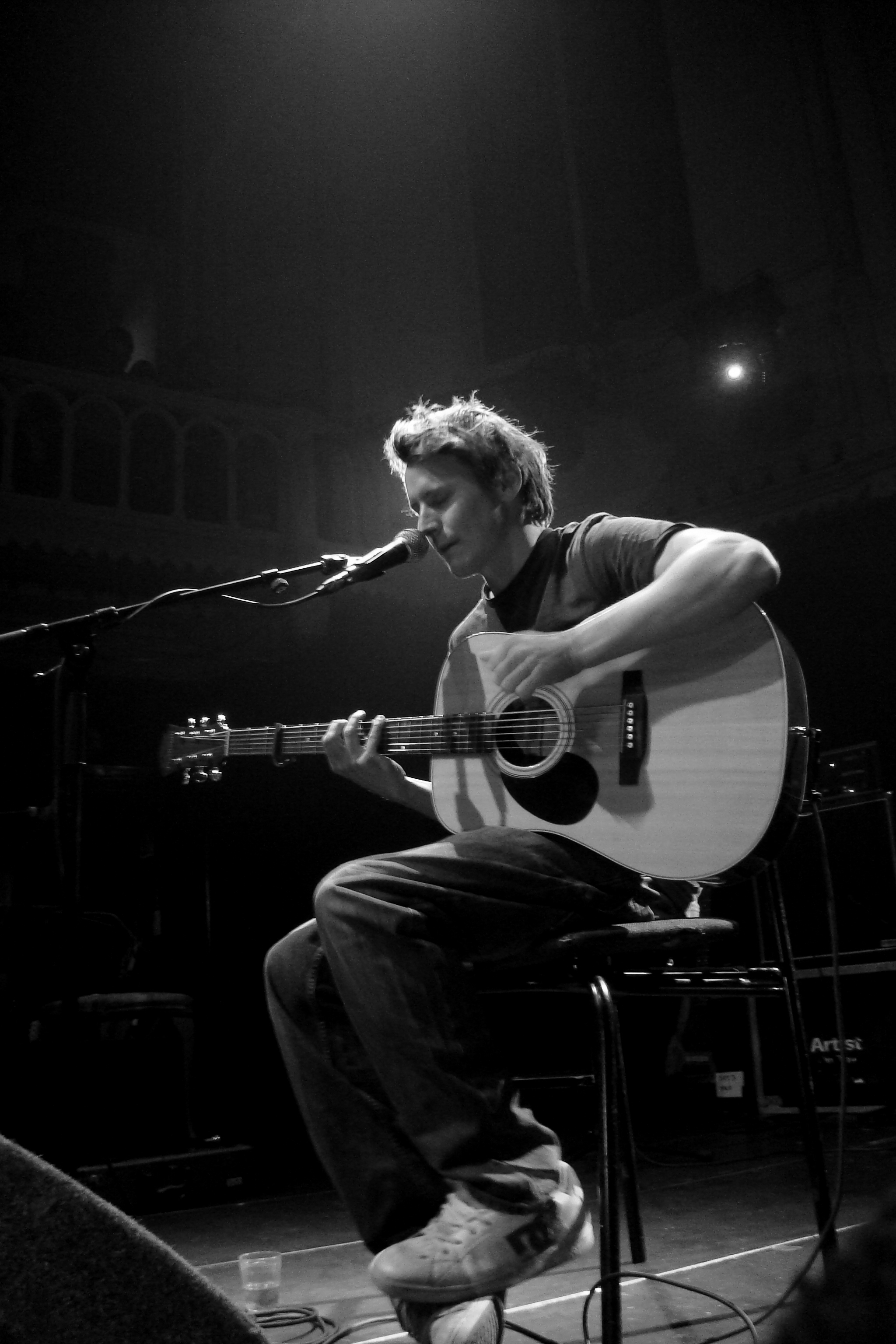
- Howard performing at Paradiso in Amsterdam, 2010
- Studio albums: 5
- EPs: 6
- Singles: 21
- Music videos: 13

The discography of the English singer-songwriter, musician and composer Ben Howard consists of five studio albums, six extended plays, twenty-one singles and thirteen music videos. Howard signed to Island Records in 2011, due to the label's history of UK folk singers, including Nick Drake and John Martyn. After singles "Old Pine" and "The Wolves" were released in 2011, Howard recorded his debut album titled Every Kingdom, which was released on 3 October 2011. He was nominated for the 2012 Mercury Prize.

In 2012, Howard launched his music in the United States, with Every Kingdom being released on 3 April 2012. In November 2012, Howard released The Burgh Island EP produced by Chris Bond, which featured four new tracks. Once again released to critical acclaim, the EP had a darker, more menacing tone than most of Howard's previous work, with Howard also playing electric guitar, rather than his traditional acoustic.

In 2014, his second studio album I Forget Where We Were became his first to reach number one in the UK. Howard released his third studio album Noonday Dream in June 2018 which peaked at number four in the UK and was met with critical acclaim. In January 2021, Howard released "What a Day", the first single from his fourth studio album Collections from the Whiteout which was released on 26 March 2021.

== Studio albums ==
Title	Album details	Peak chart positions													Certifications
Title	Album details	UK	AUS	AUT	BEL	CAN	FRA	GER	IRE	NLD	NZ	SWI	US	US Folk	Certifications
Every Kingdom	Released: 30 September 2011; Label: Island (UK), Tôt ou tard (FRA), Republic (US); Formats: CD, LP, cassette, digital download	4	—	—	2	—	52	49	13	2	—	59	—	10	BPI: 3× Platinum; ARIA: Gold; BVMI: Gold; NVPI: Platinum; RIAA: Gold
I Forget Where We Were	Released: 20 October 2014; Label: Island (UK); Formats: CD, LP, digital download	1	9	26	2	7	68	12	5	2	6	15	23	3	BPI: Platinum
Noonday Dream	Released: 1 June 2018; Label: Island (UK); Formats: CD, LP, digital download	4	23	38	14	61	126	17	12	10	38	39	138	5	
Collections from the Whiteout	Released: 26 March 2021; Labels: Island (UK); Formats: CD, LP, digital download	1	—	—	14	—	—	19	17	9	—	81	—	—	
Is It?	Released: 16 June 2023; Label: Island; Formats: CD, LP, digital download	17	—	—	45	—	—	66	—	55	—	—	—	—	
"—" denotes items that were not released in that country or failed to chart.

== Extended plays ==
Title	EP details	Peak chart positions	
Title	EP details	UK	US Folk
Games in the Dark EP	Released: 2008; Label: Released independently; Format: CD	—	—
These Waters EP	Released: 7 July 2009; Label: Dualtone; Format: CD, digital download	—	—
Old Pine EP	Released: 2 April 2011; Label: Communion; Format: CD, LP, digital download	—	—
Ben Howard Live EP	Released: May 2011; Label: Not on Label; Format: Digital download	—	—
The Burgh Island EP	Released: 31 October 2012; Label: Island; Format: LP, digital download	32	11
Another Friday Night / Hot Heavy Summer / Sister	Released: 14 September 2018; Label: Universal Island Records; Format: LP, digital download	—	—
"—" denotes an album that did not chart or was not released in that territory.

== Singles ==
Title	Year	Peak chart positions							Certifications	Album
Title	Year	UK	BEL	GER	IRE	NLD	US AAA	US Rock	Certifications	Album
"The Wolves"	2011	70	77	—	—	—	—	—	BPI: Gold	Every Kingdom
"Keep Your Head Up"	2011	46	41	68	89	14	15	—	BPI: Platinum; ARIA: Platinum	Every Kingdom
"The Fear"	2011	58	5	—	—	—	—	—	BPI: Silver; BEA: Gold	Every Kingdom
"Only Love"	2012	9	—	—	37	—	6	49	BPI: 2× Platinum; ARIA: 2× Platinum	Every Kingdom
"Old Pine"	2012	— (Note: "Old Pine" did not enter the UK Singles Chart, but peaked at number 38 on the UK Physical Singles Chart.)	—	—	—	—	—	—	BPI: Platinum; ARIA: Platinum	Every Kingdom
"I Forget Where We Were"	2014	54	77	—	—	69	—	—	BPI: Gold; ARIA: Gold	I Forget Where We Were
"End of the Affair"	2014	—	—	—	—	—	—	—		I Forget Where We Were
"Conrad"	2014	—	45	—	—	—	—	—	BPI: Silver	I Forget Where We Were
"A Boat to an Island on the Wall"	2018	—	—	—	—	—	—	—		Noonday Dream
"Towing the Line"	2018	—	—	—	—	—	—	—		Noonday Dream
"Nica Libres at Dusk"	2018	—	91	—	—	—	—	—		Noonday Dream
"What a Day"	2021	— (Note: "What a Day" did not enter the UK Singles Chart, but peaked at number 2 on the UK Physical Singles Chart, and at number 1 on the UK Vinyl Singles Chart.)	68	—	—	—	—	—		Collections from the Whiteout
"Crowhurst’s Meme"	2021	—	—	—	—	—	—	—		Collections from the Whiteout
"Far Out"	2021	—	—	—	—	—	—	—		Collections from the Whiteout
"Follies Fixture"	2021	—	—	—	—	—	—	—		Collections from the Whiteout
"Sorry Kid"	2021	—	—	—	—	—	—	—		Collections from the Whiteout
"Couldn't Make It Up"	2023	—	—	—	—	—	—	—		Is It?
"Walking Backwards"	2023	—	—	—	—	—	—	—		Is It?
"Life In The Time"	2023	—	—	—	—	—	—	—		Is It?
"Rumble Strip"	2024	—	—	—	—	—	—	—		Non-album single
"How Are You Feeling?"	2024	—	—	—	—	—	—	—		I Forget Where We Were (10th Anniversary Deluxe)
"—" denotes a single that did not chart or was not released in that territory.

== Other charted songs ==
Title	Year	Peak chart positions						Certifications	Album
Title	Year	UK	BEL	CAN	FRA	GER	IRE	Certifications	Album
"Depth over Distance"	2011	—	—	—	—	55	—		Keep Your Head Up
"Promise"	2011	—	—	—	179	—	—	ARIA: Gold; BPI: Silver	Every Kingdom
"Oats in the Water"	2012	89	—	96	—	—	80	BPI: Silver	The Burgh Island EP
"Burgh Island"	2012	32	—	—	—	—	—		The Burgh Island EP
"Rivers In Your Mouth"	2015	—	74	—	—	—	—		I Forget Where We Were
"—" denotes a song that did not chart.

== Music videos ==
List of music videos, showing year released and director
Title	Year	Director
"The Wolves"	2011	—N/a
"Keep Your Head Up"	2011	—N/a
"The Fear"	2011	—N/a
"Only Love"	2012	—N/a
"Old Pine"	2012	—N/a
"Esmerelda"	2012	Mickey Smith
"I Forget Where We Were"	2014	Ben Howard
"Nica Libres at Dusk"	2018	Ben Howard & Allan Wilson
"What A Day"	2021	Cloé Bailly
"Sorry Kid"	2021	Thibaut Grevet
"Finders Keepers"	2021	Dylan Goodsell
"Life In The Time"	2023	N/A
"Rumble Strip"	2024	Mickey Smith
