= BBC Radio 1's Big Weekend 2015 =

British music festival held in Norwich

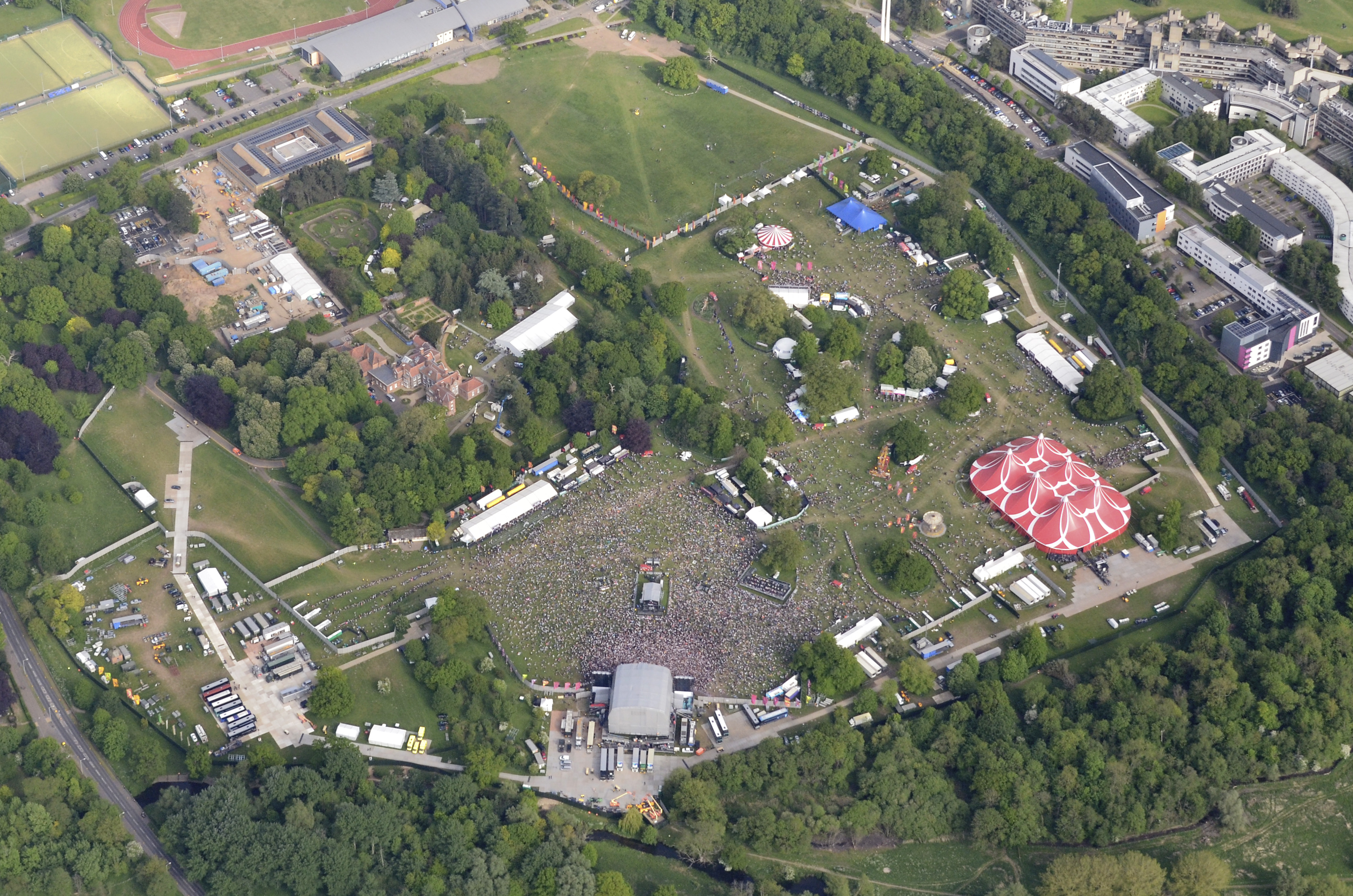
- Genre: Rock, indie, electronic, hip-hop, dance, R&B, pop
- Date: 23–24 May 2015
- Locations: Earlham Park, Norwich, England
- Website: www.bbc.co.uk/events/ewh8q9

Radio 1's Big Weekend 2015 was held in Earlham Park, Norwich between 23 and 24 May 2015.

== Ticket sales ==
Tickets were released on 31 March 2015 at 8:05 am, with 25,000 tickets available for each day respectively which were released in pairs. Within 40 minutes, all tickets were sold out. 55% of tickets were reserved for areas covered in Norwich City Council, a further 20% reserved for areas with a Norwich (NR) postcode. Another 20% was reserved exclusively for residents in the surrounding East Anglian region, and the final 5% for other audiences in the UK.

== Lineup ==
Taylor Swift was announced as the first performer on 23 January 2015 by Nick Grimshaw on his breakfast show, and 13 February 2015 saw Florence and the Machine being announced for the Saturday. On 20 April, the full lineup was announced, with Muse and Foo Fighters headlining. On 14 May, Catfish and the Bottlemen replaced Sam Smith on the Main Stage after Smith had to have surgery.

Line-up
Saturday 23 May	Sunday 24 May
Main Stage
Muse; Florence + the Machine; David Guetta; Fall Out Boy; Ben Howard; Charli XCX; The Vaccines; 5 Seconds of Summer	Foo Fighters; Taylor Swift; George Ezra; Imagine Dragons; Rita Ora; Catfish and the Bottlemen; Clean Bandit; Olly Murs
In New Music We Trust Stage
Rudimental; Jess Glynne; Hozier; Years & Years; Circa Waves; Ella Eyre; Mallory Knox; Snoop Dogg; Slaves	Jamie T Alt-J; Sigma; James Bay; Jungle; Lethal Bizzle; SOAK; Raury; Lower Than Atlantis
BBC Introducing Stage
Port Isla; Laurel; HUNTAR; Context; Ted Zed; Fickle Friends; Amber-Simone; Get Inuit; Ruen Brothers; KLOE; The Hearts; Kill It Kid	Laura Doggett; Star.One; HONNE; Hot Cops; Formation; Will Robert; Harry Edwards; Best Friends; Cash+David; Franko Fraize; Youth Club; Claws

== Setlist ==
=== Saturday ===
==== Main Stage ====
Artist(s)	Song(s)
5 Seconds of Summer	1. "End Up Here"; 2. "Don't Stop"; 3. "Good Girls"; 4. "Amnesia"; 5. "What I Like About You"; 6. "She Looks So Perfect"
The Vaccines	1. "Teenage Icon"; 2. "20/20"; 3. "Dream Lover"; 4. "Wetsuit"; 5. "Post Break-Up Sex"; 6. "Handsome"; 7. "I Always Knew"; 8. "If You Wanna"; 9. "Nørgaard"
Charli XCX	1. "London Queen"; 2. "Breaking Up"; 3. "I Love It"; 4. "Famous"; 5. "Doing It"; 6. "Need Ur Love"; 7. "Break the Rules"; 8. "Fancy"; 9. "Boom Clap"
Ben Howard	1. "Small Things"; 2. "I Forget Where We Were"; 3. "Rivers in Your Mouth"; 4. "The Wolves"; 5. "End of the Affair"
Fall Out Boy	1. "The Phoenix"; 2. "Irresistible"; 3. "Sugar, We're Goin Down"; 4. "This Ain't a Scene, It's an Arms Race"; 5. "Dance, Dance"; 6. "Uma Thurman"; 7. "Centuries"; 8. "Thnks fr th Mmrs"; 9. "My Songs Know What You Did in the Dark (Light Em Up)"
David Guetta	1. "Play Hard"; 2. "Get Low"; 3. "Shot Me Down"; 4. "Bad"; 5. "Ain't a Party"; 6. "CoCo"; 7. "Raise Your Hands"; 8. "Heat"; 9. "Hey Mama"; 10. "Love Is Gone"; 11. "Dangerous"; 12. "Lovers on the Sun"; 13. "What I Did for Love"; 14. "When Love Takes Over"; 15. "Turn Up the Bass"; 16. "Titanium"
Florence and the Machine	1. "What the Water Gave Me"; 2. "Sweet Nothing"; 3. "Only If For A Night"; 4. "How Big, How Blue, How Beautiful"; 5. "Ship to Wreck"; 6. "Shake It Out"; 7. "What Kind of Man"; 8. "Dog Days Are Over"
Muse	1. "Reapers"; 2. "Psycho"; 3. "Supermassive Black Hole"; 4. "Dead Inside"; 5. "Bliss"; 6. "Mercy"; 7. "Time Is Running Out"; 8. "Hysteria"; 9. "Uprising"; 10. "Plug In Baby"; 11. "Starlight"; 12. "Knights of Cydonia"

==== In New Music We Trust Stage ====
Artist(s)	Song(s)
Slaves	1. "White Knuckle Ride"; 2. "Where's Your Car Debbie?"; 3. "Sockets"; 4. "Cheer Up London"; 5. "Feed the Mantaray"; 6. "The Hunter"; 7. "Shutdown" (with Skepta); 8. "Hey"
Snoop Dogg	1. "The Next Episode"; 2. "Nuthin' but a 'G' Thang"; 3. "Peaches N Cream"; 4. "Wiggle"; 5. "California Gurls"; 6. "So Many Pros"; 7. "You and Your Friends"; 8. "Jump Around" (House of Pain cover); 9. "Drop It Like It's Hot"; 10. "What's My Name?"; 11. "Young, Wild & Free"
Mallory Knox	1. "Ghost in the Mirror"; 2. "Get Away"; 3. "When Are We Waking Up?"; 4. "Beggars"; 5. "Heart & Desire"; 6. "Shout at the Moon"; 7. "Lighthouse"
Ella Eyre	1. "Comeback"; 2. "Don't Follow Me"; 3. "If I Go"; 4. "Waiting All Night"; 5. "Changing" (Sigma cover); 6. "Gravity"; 7. "Together"
Circa Waves	1. "Young Chasers"; 2. "Fossils"; 3. "So Long"; 4. "Lost It"; 5. "Get Away"; 6. "My Love"; 7. "Stuck in My Teeth"; 8. "T-Shirt Weather"
Years & Years	1. "Foundation"; 2. "Take Shelter"; 3. "Shine"; 4. "Worship"; 5. "Eyes Shut"; 6. "Desire"; 7. "Real"; 8. "King"
Hozier	1. "Angel of Small Death and the Codeine Scene"; 2. "From Eden"; 3. "Jackie and Wilson"; 4. "To Be Alone"; 5. "Someone New"; 6. "Work Song"; 7. "Take Me to Church"
Jess Glynne	1. "Ain't Got Far To Go"; 2. "Right Here"; 3. "Real Love"; 4. "Gave Me Something"; 5. "My Love" (Mary J. Blige cover); 6. "Rather Be"; 7. "Don't Be So Hard On Yourself"; 8. "Not Letting Go" (with Tinie Tempah); 9. "Hold My Hand"
Rudimental	1. "Right Here"; 2. "I Will for Love"; 3. "Not Giving In"; 4. "Go Far"; 5. "Never Let You Go"; 6. "Baby"; 7. "Free"; 8. "Bloodstream"; 9. "Waiting All Night"; 10. "Love Ain't Just a Word"; 11. "Jamrock"; 12. "Original Nutter"; 13. "Feel the Love"

=== Sunday ===
==== Main Stage ====
Artist(s)	Song(s)
Olly Murs	1. "Heart Skips a Beat"; 2. "Dance with Me Tonight"; 3. "Beautiful to Me"; 4. "Troublemaker"; 5. "Up" (with Ella Eyre); 6. "Dear Darlin'"; 7. "Play That Funky Music" / "Le Freak" / "Good Times" / "Uptown Funk" / "Oops Up Side Your Head" (Wild Cherry, Chic, Mark Ronson, Bruno Mars and The Gap Band cover); 8. "Wrapped Up" (with Nick Grimshaw)
Clean Bandit	1. "Real Love"; 2. "Cologne"; 3. "Stronger"; 4. "A+E"; 5. "Come Over"; 6. "Extraordinary"; 7. "Up Again" (with Rae Morris); 8. "Nightingale"; 9. "Show Me Love"; 10. "Rather Be"
Catfish and the Bottlemen	1. "Kathleen"; 2. "Pacifer"; 3. "Fallout"; 4. "Homesick"; 5. "Cocoon"; 6. "Tyrants"
Rita Ora	1. "R.I.P." (with "Moschino" intro); 2. "Black Widow"; 3. "Kingdom Come"; 4. "Doing It"; 5. "I Will Never Let You Down"; 6. "New York Raining" (with Charles Hamilton); 7. "Poison"; 8. "Hot Right Now"
Imagine Dragons	1. "It's Time"; 2. "Shots"; 3. "I'm So Sorry"; 4. "Demons"; 5. "Gold"; 6. "On Top of the World"; 7. "Radioactive"
George Ezra	1. "Cassy O'"; 2. "Listen to the Man"; 3. "Blame It on Me"; 4. "Barcelona"; 5. "Stand by Your Gun"; 6. "Song 6"; 7. "Spectacular Rival"; 8. "Budapest"; 9. "Blind Man in Amsterdam"; 10. "Did You Hear the Rain?"
Taylor Swift	1. "We Are Never Ever Getting Back Together"; 2. "Blank Space"; 3. "Style"; 4. "I Knew You Were Trouble"; 5. "Love Story (1989 Remix)"; 6. "Bad Blood"; 7. "Shake It Off"
Foo Fighters	1. "Everlong"; 2. "Monkey Wrench"; 3. "Learn to Fly"; 4. "Something from Nothing"; 5. "Walk"; 6. "My Hero"; 7. "Congregation"; 8. "These Days"; 9. "Best of You"; 10. "All My Life"
