= What Did You Expect from the Vaccines? =

Studio album by the Vaccines
- Released: 11 March 2011
- Recorded: Autumn 2010; RAK and Miloco Square Studios, London, United Kingdom
- Genre: Indie rock; surf punk; garage pop
- Length: 36:17
- Label: Columbia Records
- Producer: Dan Grech-Marguerat

The Vaccines chronology
What Did You Expect from the Vaccines? (2011)	Come of Age (2012)

Singles from What Did You Expect from the Vaccines?
- 1. "Wreckin' Bar (Ra Ra Ra)" / "Blow It Up" Released: 22 November 2010; 2. "Post Break-Up Sex" Released: 24 January 2011; 3. "If You Wanna" Released: 18 March 2011; 4. "All in White" Released: 5 June 2011; 5. "Nørgaard" Released: 22 August 2011; 6. "Wetsuit" / "Tiger Blood" Released: 11 December 2011

Professional ratings
Review scores
Source	Rating
AllMusic	2.5/5 stars
The A.V. Club	A−
The Daily Telegraph	4/5 stars
The Guardian	3/5 stars
NME	8/10
Mojo	4/5 stars
Pitchfork Media	6.2/10
Q	4/5 stars
Spin	8/10
Uncut	4/5 stars

What Did You Expect from the Vaccines? is the debut studio album by English indie rock band the Vaccines. It was released on CD and digital download in the US, and on CD and LP throughout Europe, on 11 March 2011 by Columbia Records, entering the UK Albums Chart at #4, going on to become the biggest-selling debut by a band in 2011. Two singles preceded the release of the album which attained generally positive reviews and gold status by May of the same year.

In 2021, the Vaccines released a ten year anniversary edition of the album on pink vinyl limited to 2500 copies.

== Singles ==
The first single from the album, "Wreckin' Bar (Ra Ra Ra)" / "Blow It Up" was released in the United Kingdom on 22 November 2010 through Marshall Teller Records. The single was an unexpected airplay hit in the UK, Australia and Europe, and hit the lower regions of the UK chart. The second single from the album, "Post Break-Up Sex", was released in the United Kingdom on 24 January 2011. The single debuted at number 32 on the UK chart. The third single from the album, "If You Wanna" was released on 20 March 2011, a week after the release of the album. Having first been released as the band's first demo, the single has been re-recorded for the album. The single gained chart success peaking at number 35.

The fourth single from the album, "All in White" was released on 5 June 2011. The fifth single from the album, "Nørgaard", a song about Danish Supermodel Amanda Nørgaard was released digitally on 19 August 2011. The song had previously been available for free as the "Single of the Week" on iTunes. The sixth and final single from the album, "Wetsuit" / "Tiger Blood" was released on 11 December 2011. The single was made available as a double A-side with a new Albert Hammond, Jr.-produced track "Tiger Blood".

== Influences ==
Lead singer and songwriter Justin Young cites I, Jonathan by Jonathan Richman, Milo Goes to College by Descendents and "California Girls" by The Beach Boys as his major inspirations during the writing of this album. In a conversation with music site Atwood Magazine, Young said, "I remember we were petrified of not being able to capture the energy and we worked with (our producer) Dan Grech, who's an amazing producer and mix engineer but hadn't made any particularly energetic or aggressive sounding records, so we were constantly, as a team – Dan included – we were constantly aware of the fact that we might fall short. So we were always going the extra mile".

== Track listing ==
All lyrics written by Justin Young; all music composed by the Vaccines.

No.	Title	Length
1.	"Wreckin' Bar (Ra Ra Ra)"	1:24
2.	"If You Wanna"	3:02
3.	"A Lack of Understanding"	2:58
4.	"Blow It Up"	2:41
5.	"Wetsuit"	3:50
6.	"Nørgaard"	1:38
7.	"Post Break-Up Sex"	2:56
8.	"Under Your Thumb"	2:20
9.	"All in White"	4:33
10.	"Wolf Pack"	2:23
11.	"Family Friend" (includes hidden track "Somebody Else's Child", starting at 5:35)	8:35

Japanese Bonus Tracks
No.	Title	Length
12.	"Good Guys Don't Wear White" (Live) (The Standells cover)	2:22
13.	"It's All Good"	2:46
14.	"Out of the Way"	2:44
15.	"We're Happening"	2:42
16.	"Primal Urges"	3:04
17.	"Tuck and Roll"	3:19

== Personnel ==
- Justin Young—vocals, rhythm guitar
- Freddie Cowan—lead guitar, backing vocals
- Arni Arnason—bass guitar, backing vocals
- Pete Robertson—drums, backing vocals

== Charts ==
=== Weekly charts ===
Chart (2011)	Peak position
Austrian Albums (Ö3 Austria)	50
Belgian Albums (Ultratop Flanders)	29
Belgian Albums (Ultratop Wallonia)	45
Danish Albums (Hitlisten)	33
Dutch Albums (Album Top 100)	35
French Albums (SNEP)	124
German Albums (Offizielle Top 100)	82
Irish Albums (IRMA)	16
Scottish Albums (OCC)	4
Swedish Albums (Sverigetopplistan)	40
Swiss Albums (Schweizer Hitparade)	36
UK Albums (OCC)	4

=== Year-end charts ===
Chart (2011)	Position
UK Albums (OCC)	53
Chart (2012)	Position
UK Albums (OCC)	70
