= Jeremy Abbott =

American figure skater (born 1985)

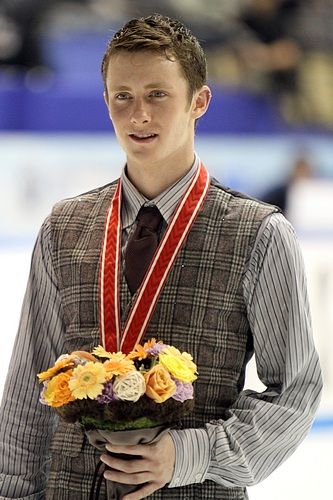
- Jeremy Abbott at the 2010 NHK Trophy

Personal information
- Born: June 5, 1985 (age 41) Aspen, Colorado, United States
- Home town: Royal Oak, Michigan, United States
- Height: 5 ft 9 in (1.75 m)

Figure skating career
- Country: United States
- Discipline: Men's singles
- Began skating: 1989
- Retired: June 22, 2017
- Highest WS: 5th (2009–10)

Medal record
Event	Gold medal – first place	Silver medal – second place	Bronze medal – third place
Olympic Games	0	0	1
Four Continents Championships	0	0	2
Grand Prix Final	1	0	0
U.S. Championships	4	0	1
World Team Trophy	2	1	0
Medal list
Olympic Games
Bronze medal – third place	2014 Sochi	Team
Four Continents Championships
Bronze medal – third place	2007 Colorado Springs	Singles
Bronze medal – third place	2011 Taipei	Singles
Grand Prix Final
Gold medal – first place	2008–09 Goyang	Singles
U.S. Championships
Gold medal – first place	2009 Cleveland	Singles
Gold medal – first place	2010 Spokane	Singles
Gold medal – first place	2012 San Jose	Singles
Gold medal – first place	2014 Boston	Singles
Bronze medal – third place	2013 Omaha	Singles
World Team Trophy
Gold medal – first place	2009 Tokyo	Team
Gold medal – first place	2013 Tokyo	Team
Silver medal – second place	2012 Tokyo	Team

Jeremy Abbott (born June 5, 1985) is a retired American competitive figure skater. He is the 2008 Grand Prix of Figure Skating Final champion, a two-time Four Continents Championship bronze medalist (2007, 2011), and a four-time U.S. national champion (2009–2010, 2012, 2014). He represented the United States at the 2010 Winter Olympics, where he finished ninth, and the 2014 Winter Olympics, where he won a bronze medal in the team event. Since retiring, Abbott has worked as a choreographer and figure skating coach.

== Personal life ==
Jeremy Abbott was born on June 5, 1985, in Aspen, Colorado, to Allison and Danny Abbott. He has an older sister, Gwen Abbott, a former nationally ranked downhill ski racer and Winter X Games competitor in extreme skiing. He attended Cheyenne Mountain High School for five years, stretching his high school career out one year longer than the usual, so he could concentrate on both skating and getting good grades. He graduated in 2004. Following his win on the junior level at 2005 U.S. Championships, Abbott established a fund at the Aspen Skating Club to help up-and-coming boys to pay for training. He established another fund in 2006 to provide financial assistance to skaters in the Roaring Fork Valley community.

In January 2015, Abbott's father, Danny Abbott, died from complications due to Parkinson's disease. Abbott competed at the 2015 U.S. Championships shortly afterward. "It was such an unfortunate circumstance, but so many wonderful things came out of it," Abbott said. "I got to spend a lot of time with my family, and... the funeral in Aspen ended up being a celebration of his life instead of a mourning of his loss.

Although he had not hidden his sexuality from his friends and family, Abbott chose to come out as gay in June 2020. "I just never talked about it publicly. And I held a lot of shame, actually, about that for a long time," Abbott said. "I struggled with saying it for many reasons, because a lot of times... I always felt like I was doing it for the wrong reason. Honestly, with the political climate and everything... I was just like, 'You know what? One more voice can help, so here it is.'"

== Skating career ==
=== Early years ===
Abbott began skating at age two. He began competing at age four after being inspired by Robin Cousins. As a juvenile, he competed in ice dance with Amanda Cunningham from 1995 to 1996 and with Katie Hoffmaster from 1997 to 1998. He competed in pair skating with Brittany Vise from 1998 to 1999 and with Krystal Sorenson from 2001 to 2002.

In his early years, Abbott was coached by Peggy Behr in Aspen, Colorado. In 1999, Abbott moved from Aspen to Colorado Springs to train at the Colorado Springs World Arena with Tom Zakrajsek. He began representing the Broadmoor Skating Club.

Abbott began competing in singles at the novice level in the 2000–01 season, but failed to make it out of sectionals. The next year he made it to Nationals, where he placed 6th at the novice level.

For the 2002–03 and 2004–05 seasons, Abbott competed on the junior level nationally, although he did not reach the 2003 U.S. Championships at the junior level. He fractured his L5 vertebra in 2003, which kept him off the ice for fifteen weeks leading up to regionals, yet he was able to place seventh at the 2004 U.S. Championships.

He won the Junior national title at the 2005 U.S. Championships. A remark he made during this competition – "Stranger things could happen; pigs could fly!" – led him to adopt a pig with wings as his mascot. Abbott made it the slogan of his charitable fund, which he launched to help young male skaters struggling to pay coaching fees, ice time, and competition fees.

=== 2005–08 ===
Abbott was given his first senior international assignment in the 2005–06 Olympic season, placing eighteenth at the 2005 Nebelhorn Trophy. Abbott then placed fifth at the Midwestern Sectionals and missed a chance to go to the 2006 U.S. Championships and compete for an Olympic berth. Abbott later blamed his performance on his poor training habits, and said that he had become lazy after winning the junior national title; failing to make it out of sectionals gave him the motivation he needed.

In the 2006–07 season, Abbott was given another international assignment, this time to the 2006 Finlandia Trophy, which he won. He won sectionals and advanced to the 2007 U.S. Championships, where he won the pewter medal. Abbott was named the first alternate to the World and Four Continents teams. When Johnny Weir withdrew from the 2007 Four Continents Championships, Abbott was given the opportunity to compete at the event, which was held at his home rink, World Arena, Colorado Springs. He beat out his training mate Ryan Bradley to win the bronze medal.

In the 2007–08 season, Abbott debuted on the Grand Prix circuit, placing eighth at the 2007 Skate Canada and fourth at the 2007 NHK Trophy. At the 2008 U.S. Championships, he again won the pewter medal. He placed fifth at the 2008 Four Continents Championships. He was sent to the 2008 World Championships after Evan Lysacek withdrew with injury, where he placed eleventh.

=== 2008–09 ===
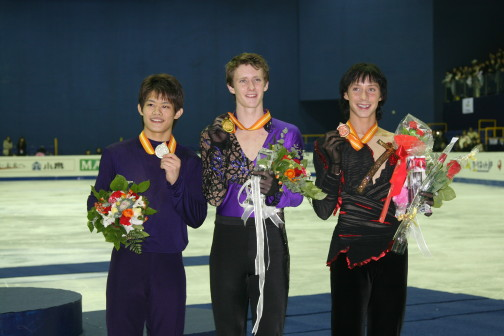
Abbott and his fellow medalists at the 2008-2009 Grand Prix Final.

In the 2008–09 season, Abbott had a breakthrough season on the Grand Prix circuit. He won the 2008 Cup of China and placed fourth at the 2008 Cup of Russia to qualify for the 2008–09 Grand Prix Final. He won the Grand Prix Final, becoming the first American man to do so, and achieved the highest total free skate score for an American man at that time. At the 2009 U.S. Championships, Abbott won both the short program and the free skate to win the gold medal. At the 2009 World Championships, Abbot placed tenth in both the short program and free skate, and finished eleventh overall. In the off-season, he performed at the Festa On Ice show in South Korea, his first ice show in a foreign country.

In May 2009, Abbott switched coaches to Yuka Sato in Bloomfield Hills, Michigan.

=== 2009–10 season ===
Abbott began the 2009–10 season with a fifth-place finish at the 2009 NHK Trophy. He then won the 2009 Skate Canada to qualify once again for the Grand Prix Final, where he placed fourth.

At the 2010 U.S. Championships, Abbott won both segments of the competition to win the title overall, finishing 25 points ahead of the second place Evan Lysacek. He was named to the Winter Olympic team. At the 2010 Winter Olympics in Vancouver, a disastrous performance left him in fifteenth place after the short program. Abbott earned a score of 149.56 in the free skate, placing ninth overall. At the 2010 World Championships, he skated a strong short program to place sixth in the segment; however, in the free skate, he twice fell and finished fifth overall. In the off-season, Abbott performed with the Stars on Ice tour.

=== 2010–11 season ===
Abbott decided to remain with Sato for the 2010–11 season. In a November 2011 interview, he said he was seeing a sports psychologist once a week. His training was hampered by the first serious boot problems of his career. Abbott explained, "I could not get the blades mounted quite right, and they were never quite comfortable". He went through eight pairs of boots. The problems were resolved toward the end of the season.

At the 2011 U.S. Championships, Abbott was second after the short program, but struggled through parts of his free skate to finish fourth overall. He won his third pewter medal with a total score of 224.16, missing the bronze medal by just 0.19 points. The selection committee left him off the 2011 World Championships team, disappointing Abbott who thought the rules stated that other results would be taken into consideration. He was named to the team to the 2011 Four Continents Championships instead, where he won the bronze medal.

=== 2011–12 season ===
For the 2011–12 Grand Prix season, Abbott was assigned to compete at the 2011 Cup of China and 2011 Cup of Russia. He later said they were not the two he had asked for, but it had worked out well. He placed third in both programs at the Cup of China and came away with the gold medal. At the Cup of Russia, Abbott won the short program with a new personal best of 83.54 points. He placed fifth in the free skate and won the bronze medal overall. He qualified for his third Grand Prix Final.

At the 2012 U.S. Championships, Abbott placed first in both programs and won his third national title. He withdrew from the 2012 Four Continents Championships due to back spasms. He finished 8th at the 2012 World Championships.

=== 2012–13 season ===
Abbott finished fifth at his first Grand Prix event of the season, the 2012 Skate America. Early in the season, he had a compressed disk in his lower back, which also caused nerve problems in his legs, but his condition began to improve by his next event in France. He won the silver medal at the 2012 Trophée Éric Bompard. At the 2013 U.S. Championships, he won the bronze medal.

=== 2013–14 season ===
During an interview for "The Skating Lesson Podcast", Abbott told Jennifer Kirk that the 2013–14 season would be his last. He finished sixth at the 2013 Skate Canada International, and won the bronze medal at the second, the 2013 NHK Trophy. At the 2014 U.S. Championships, he placed first in the short program and second in the free skate. Abbott finished first overall, and was named to the U.S. team to the 2014 Winter Olympics in Sochi, Russia.

During the men's individual event at the Olympics, Abbott fell hard on the ice during the short program after attempting a quadruple toe loop, sliding into the boards, where he lay stunned for several seconds, grabbing at his hip in pain. His coach Yuka Sato was attempting to open the door to enter onto the ice when Abbott got up and continued his routine. He explained afterward that the cheers of the audience inspired him to get up and finish his performance. Abbott altered his planned routine to account for the lost time, but he still managed to complete all of the required elements and finished strong. He received a standing ovation from the audience, and doubled over in pain as he exited the ice. He ultimately finished the short program in fifteenth place. "I'm not in the least bit ashamed," Abbott said afterward, "I ... finished that program and I'm proud of my effort and proud of what I did under the circumstance". Abbott finished in twelfth place after the free skate; he had woken up in pain after his fall on the ice during the short program, and was unable to do any loop jumps, so he swapped them out for other jumps, and eschewed the quadruple toe loop that had caused his fall. For Abbott, who had already announced that he would retire at the end of the season, the chance to end the 2014 Winter Olympics with a clean performance was a redemption.

He was awarded a team bronze medal. He went on to compete at the 2014 World Championships, where he had a fourth place free skate and placed fifth overall.

=== 2014–15 season ===
Abbott was given assignments for the 2014 Skate America and 2014 NHK Trophy for the 2014–15 season. He placed fifth at both events.

Shortly before the 2015 U.S. Championships, Abbott's father died. Despite this hardship, Abbott decided to compete anyway and finished fifth. During the gala, Abbott paid a tribute to his late father.

=== 2015–16 season and after ===
At the beginning of the 2015–16 season, Abbott stated that he would sit out the season, but said he did not plan on retiring. In October 2015, he participated in the 2015 Japan Open, a team event in Japan. In January 2016, he won gold at the 2016 Medal Winners Open, an ISU-sanctioned pro-am competition held in Japan.

During the 2016–2017 season, Abbott participated in the 2016 Japan Open. At the end of the season, he announced his retirement from competitive skating.

== Coaching and choreographer career ==
Since retiring from competition, Abbott has started choreographing and coaching. He has choreographed programs for former two-time U.S. champion Gracie Gold. As a coach, he has worked with two-time U.S. champion Alysa Liu, as well as Dinh Tran.

== Programs ==
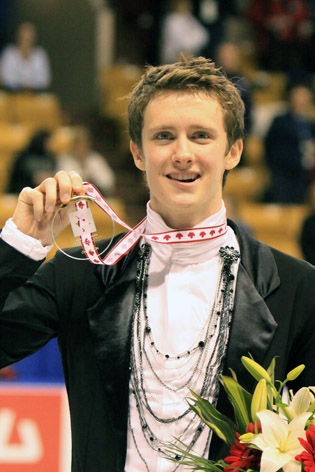
Abbott at the 2009 Skate Canada International

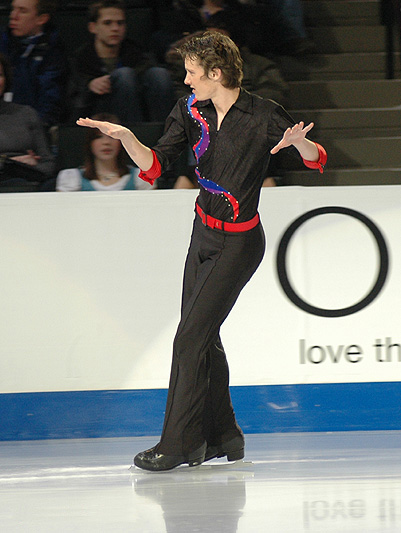
Abbott performs his exhibition at the 2008 U.S. Championships.

Season	Short program	Free skate	Exhibition	Ref.
2004–05	Concierto de Aranjuez By Joaquín Rodrigo Choreo. by Damon Allen	Selections by Safri Duo Choreo. by Damon Allen & Jeremy Abbott	—N/a	
2005–06	I'm A-Doun By Vanessa-Mae Choreo. by Christopher Dean	Selections by Safri Duo Choreo. by Damon Allen & Jeremy Abbott	—N/a	
2005–06	I'm A-Doun By Vanessa-Mae Choreo. by Christopher Dean	Selections by William Joseph Choreo. by Damon Allen	—N/a	
2006–07	Dead Already From American Beauty By Thomas Newman Choreo. by Damon Allen & Jeremy Abbott	Symphony No. 25 in G minor By Wolfgang Amadeus Mozart; Praeludium and Allegro By Fritz Kreisler Choreo. by Tom Dickson	Save the Last Dance for Me By Michael Bublé Choreo. by Damon Allen & Jeremy Abbott	
2007–08	Treat By Carlos Santana Choreo. by Kurt Browning	Ghost Waltz From Mistletoe Bride By Paul Chihara; Waltz No. 2 From Suite for Variety Orchestra By Dmitri Shostakovich; River Waltz From The Painted Veil; Masquerade Waltz by Aram Khachaturian Choreo. by Tom Dickson	Faith By George Michael Choreo. by Damon Allen, Caroline Miller & Jeremy Abbott	
2008–09	Adagio in G minor By Tomaso Albinoni Choreo. by Catarina Lindgren	Eight Seasons By Astor Piazzolla Performed by Gidon Kremer & Kremerata Baltica Choreo. by Tom Dickson	Faith By George Michael Choreo. by Damon Allen, Caroline Miller & Jeremy Abbott	
2008–09	Adagio in G minor By Tomaso Albinoni Choreo. by Catarina Lindgren	Eight Seasons By Astor Piazzolla Performed by Gidon Kremer & Kremerata Baltica Choreo. by Tom Dickson	Treat	
2009–10	A Day in the Life By Jeff Beck Choreo. by Shae-Lynn Bourne	Symphony No. 3 (Organ Symphony) By Camille Saint-Saëns Choreo. by Pasquale Camerlengo; Jupiter From The Planets By Gustav Holst; Pines of Rome By Ottorino Respighi Choreo. by Tom Dickson	Symphony No. 3 (Organ Symphony)	
2009–10	A Day in the Life By Jeff Beck Choreo. by Shae-Lynn Bourne	Symphony No. 3 (Organ Symphony) By Camille Saint-Saëns Choreo. by Pasquale Camerlengo; Jupiter From The Planets By Gustav Holst; Pines of Rome By Ottorino Respighi Choreo. by Tom Dickson	At This Moment By Michael Bublé Choreo. by Yuka Sato	
2009–10	A Day in the Life By Jeff Beck Choreo. by Shae-Lynn Bourne	Symphony No. 3 (Organ Symphony) By Camille Saint-Saëns Choreo. by Pasquale Camerlengo; Jupiter From The Planets By Gustav Holst; Pines of Rome By Ottorino Respighi Choreo. by Tom Dickson	Gotta Get thru This By Daniel Bedingfield Choreo. by Tom Dickson	
2010–11	Viejos Aires By Ensemble Nuevo Tango Choreo. by Antonio Najarro & Yuka Sato	Life Is Beautiful By Nicola Piovani Choreo. by David Wilson	Hometown Glory By Adele Choreo. by Yuka Sato, Massimo Scali & Jeremy Abbott	
2010–11	Viejos Aires By Ensemble Nuevo Tango Choreo. by Antonio Najarro & Yuka Sato	Life Is Beautiful By Nicola Piovani Choreo. by David Wilson	Rhythm of Love By The Plain White T's Choreo. by Jeremy Abbott	
2010–11	Viejos Aires By Ensemble Nuevo Tango Choreo. by Antonio Najarro & Yuka Sato	Life Is Beautiful By Nicola Piovani Choreo. by David Wilson	At This Moment	
2011–12	Sing, Sing, Sing By Swing Kids; Bei Mir Bistu Shein Choreo. by Buddy & Benji Schwimmer	Exogenesis: Symphony Part 3 By Muse Choreo. by Jeremy Abbott & Yuka Sato	Hometown Glory	
2011–12	Sing, Sing, Sing By Swing Kids; Bei Mir Bistu Shein Choreo. by Buddy & Benji Schwimmer	Exogenesis: Symphony Part 3 By Muse Choreo. by Jeremy Abbott & Yuka Sato	I Won't Give Up by Jason Mraz	
2011–12	Sing, Sing, Sing By Swing Kids; Bei Mir Bistu Shein Choreo. by Buddy & Benji Schwimmer	Exogenesis: Symphony Part 3 By Muse Choreo. by Jeremy Abbott & Yuka Sato	Sing, Sing, Sing	
2012–13	Spy By Nathan Lanier Choreo. by Benji Schwimmer	Bring Him Home From Les Misérables By Claude-Michel Schönberg Arranged by Steven Jamail Choreo. by Jeremy Abbott & Yuka Sato	Home By Phillip Phillips	
2012–13	Spy By Nathan Lanier Choreo. by Benji Schwimmer	Bring Him Home From Les Misérables By Claude-Michel Schönberg Arranged by Steven Jamail Choreo. by Jeremy Abbott & Yuka Sato	I Won't Give Up	
2013–14	Lilies of the Valley From Pina By Jun Miyake Choreo. by Robin Cousins	Exogenesis: Symphony Part 3 By Muse Additional performance by Micah Burgess Choreo. by Jeremy Abbott & Yuka Sato	Latch By Disclosure, feat. Sam Smith	
2013–14	Lilies of the Valley From Pina By Jun Miyake Choreo. by Robin Cousins	Exogenesis: Symphony Part 3 By Muse Additional performance by Micah Burgess Choreo. by Jeremy Abbott & Yuka Sato	The Fear By Ben Howard	
2013–14	Lilies of the Valley From Pina By Jun Miyake Choreo. by Robin Cousins	Exogenesis: Symphony Part 3 By Muse Additional performance by Micah Burgess Choreo. by Jeremy Abbott & Yuka Sato	Bring Him Home	
2014–15	Lay Me Down By Sam Smith Choreo. by Jeremy Abbott & Yuka Sato	Adagio for Strings By Samuel Barber Choreo. by Sandra Bezic	Dear Lord By John Coltrane Performed by the UNC School of the Arts Saxophone Ensemble	
2014–15	Lay Me Down By Sam Smith Choreo. by Jeremy Abbott & Yuka Sato	Adagio for Strings By Samuel Barber Choreo. by Sandra Bezic	Black Skinhead By Kanye West Choreo. by Benji Schwimmer	
2015–16	—N/a	Bring Him Home (from Les Misérables) by Claude-Michel Schönberg	Bridge over Troubled Water by Simon & Garfunkel choreo. by Jeffrey Buttle	
2015–16	—N/a	Bring Him Home (from Les Misérables) by Claude-Michel Schönberg	Peanut Butter Jelly by Galantis choreo. by Benji Schwimmer	
2015–16	—N/a	Bring Him Home (from Les Misérables) by Claude-Michel Schönberg	The Fear by Ben Howard	
2015–16	—N/a	Adagio for Strings by Samuel Barber choreo. by Sandra Bezic	Crystall Ball by Styx	
2015–16	—N/a	Adagio for Strings by Samuel Barber choreo. by Sandra Bezic	How Will I Know covered by Sam Smith	
2016–17	—N/a	Old Pine by Ben Howard choreo. by Jeremy Abbott	In This Shirt by The Irrepressibles choreo. by Benoît Richaud	
2016–17	—N/a	Old Pine by Ben Howard choreo. by Jeremy Abbott	Exogenesis: Symphony Part 3 by Muse choreo. by Jeremy Abbott & Yuka Sato	
2016–17	—N/a	Old Pine by Ben Howard choreo. by Jeremy Abbott	Land of All by Woodkid choreo. by Benoît Richaud	
2016–17	—N/a	Old Pine by Ben Howard choreo. by Jeremy Abbott	The Christmas Song by Robert Wells & Mel Tormé	
2016–17	—N/a	Old Pine by Ben Howard choreo. by Jeremy Abbott	It's the Most Wonderful Time of the Year by Edward Pola & George Wyle	
2016–17	—N/a	Old Pine by Ben Howard choreo. by Jeremy Abbott	Beautiful by Ben Rector	
2016–17	—N/a	Old Pine by Ben Howard choreo. by Jeremy Abbott	This Is It by Kenny Loggins & Michael McDonald	
2017–18	—N/a	My Way by Claude François, Jacques Revaux & Paul Anka performed by Frank Sinatra choreo. by Benoît Richaud	Land of All	
2017–18	—N/a	My Way by Claude François, Jacques Revaux & Paul Anka performed by Frank Sinatra choreo. by Benoît Richaud	This by Darius Rucker	
2017–18	—N/a	My Way by Claude François, Jacques Revaux & Paul Anka performed by Frank Sinatra choreo. by Benoît Richaud	Hard Habit to Break by Steve Kipner & John Lewis Parker performed by Peter Cetera	
2017–18	—N/a	My Way by Claude François, Jacques Revaux & Paul Anka performed by Frank Sinatra choreo. by Benoît Richaud	In This Shirt by The Irrepressibles choreo. by Benoît Richaud	
2018–19	—N/a	—N/a	Pure Imagination by Leslie Bricusse & Anthony Newley performed by Jamie Cullum	
2018–19	—N/a	—N/a	Weathered by Jack Garratt	

== Competitive highlights ==
- GP – Event of the ISU Grand Prix Series
- CS – Event of the ISU Challenger Series
- Medals at team events are awarded for the team result only. Individual placements at team events are listed in parentheses.

Competition placements at senior level
Season	2005–06	2006–07	2007–08	2008–09	2009–10	2010–11	2011–12	2012–13	2013–14	2014–15
Winter Olympics					9th				12th	
Winter Olympics (Team event)									3rd	
World Championships			11th	11th	5th		8th		5th	
Four Continents Championships		3rd	5th	5th		3rd				
Grand Prix Final				1st	4th		5th			
U.S. Championships		4th	4th	1st	1st	4th	1st	3rd	1st	5th
World Team Trophy				1st (5th)			2nd (5th)	1st (6th)		
GP Cup of China				1st			1st			
GP France								2nd		
GP NHK Trophy			4th		5th	2nd			3rd	5th
GP Rostelecom Cup				4th		3rd	3rd			
GP Skate America								5th		5th
GP Skate Canada			8th		1st				6th	
CS Finlandia Trophy		1st								
CS Nebelhorn Trophy	18th									
Challenge Cup							2nd			
Japan Open					2nd (3rd)				2nd (3rd)	

Competition placements at junior level
Season	2002–03	2003–04	2004–05
U.S. Championships		7th	1st
Copenhagen Trophy	3rd		

== Detailed results ==
ISU personal best scores in the +3/-3 GOE System
Segment	Type	Score	Event
Total	TSS	246.35	2014 World Championships
Short program	TSS	86.98	2012 World Team Trophy
Short program	TES	45.40	2009 NHK Trophy
Short program	PCS	42.89	2012 World Team Trophy
Free skating	TSS	166.68	2014 World Championships
Free skating	TES	82.56	2008–09 Grand Prix Final
Free skating	PCS	86.16	2014 World Championships

- Small medals for the short program and free skating are only awarded at ISU Championships.
- At national events in the United States, pewter medals are awarded for fourth place.
- Medals at team events are awarded for the team results only. Individual placements at team events are listed in parentheses.

=== Senior level ===
Results in the 2005–06 season
Date	Event	SP		FS		Total	
Date	Event	P	Score	P	Score	P	Score
Sep 29 – Oct 2, 2005	(Germany) 2005 Nebelhorn Trophy	21	35.41	17	88.51	18	123.92

Results in the 2006–07 season
Date	Event	SP		FS		Total	
Date	Event	P	Score	P	Score	P	Score
Oct 6–8, 2006	(Finland) 2006 Finlandia Trophy	2	67.60	2	119.66	1	187.26
Jan 21–28, 2007	(United States) 2007 U.S. Championships	9	64.48	3	136.47	4	200.95
Feb 7–10, 2007	(United States) 2007 Four Continents Championships	2	74.34	4	128.88	3	203.22

Results in the 2007–08 season
Date	Event	SP		FS		Total	
Date	Event	P	Score	P	Score	P	Score
Nov 1–4, 2007	2007 Skate Canada International	8	50.86	5	99.20	5	150.06
Nov 29–30, 2007	(Japan) 2007 NHK Trophy	12	58.27	4	129.49	4	187.56
Jan 20–27, 2008	(United States) 2009 U.S. Championships	5	73.28	4	148.57	4	221.85
Feb 13–17, 2008	(South Korea) 2008 Four Continents Championships	9	60.87	4	145.53	5	206.40
Mar 17–23, 2008	(Sweden) 2008 World Championships	14	65.61	10	131.65	11	197.26

Results in the 2008–09 season
Date	Event	SP		FS		Total	
Date	Event	P	Score	P	Score	P	Score
Nov 5–9, 2008	2008 Cup of China	1	77.09	1	156.39	1	233.44
Nov 21–23, 2008	2008 Cup of Russia	3	68.60	2	148.68	4	217.48
Dec 10–14, 2008	(South Korea) 2008–09 Grand Prix Final	2	78.26	1	159.46	1	237.72
Jan 18–25, 2009	(United States) 2009 U.S. Championships	1	86.40	1	155.49	1	241.89
Feb 4–8, 2009	(Canada) 2009 Four Continents Championships	4	75.67	6	141.27	5	216.94
Mar 23–29, 2009	(United States) 2009 World Championships	10	72.15	10	132.52	11	204.67
Apr 16–19, 2010	(Japan) 2009 World Team Trophy	5	71.27	5	133.78	1 (5)	205.05

Results in the 2009–10 season
Date	Event	SP		FS		Total	
Date	Event	P	Score	P	Score	P	Score
Oct 3, 2009	2009 Japan Open	—N/a	—N/a	2	132.87	2	—N/a
Nov 5–8, 2009	(Japan) 2009 NHK Trophy	2	83.00	6	125.45	5	208.45
Nov 19–22, 2009	2009 Skate Canada International	1	79.00	2	153.99	1	232.99
Dec 3–6, 2009	(Japan) 2009–10 Grand Prix Final	5	76.65	2	158.73	4	235.38
Jan 14–24, 2010	(United States) 2010 U.S. Championships	1	87.85	1	175.81	1	263.66
Feb 12–28, 2010	(Canada) 2010 Winter Olympics	15	69.40	9	149.56	9	218.96
Mar 22–28, 2010	(Italy) 2010 World Championships	6	81.05	5	151.36	5	232.10

Results in the 2010–11 season
Date	Event	SP		FS		Total	
Date	Event	P	Score	P	Score	P	Score
Oct 22–24, 2010	(Japan) 2010 NHK Trophy	2	74.62	3	143.57	2	218.19
Nov 19–21, 2012	2010 Cup of Russia	2	77.61	4	139.60	3	217.21
Jan 22–30, 2011	(United States) 2011 U.S. Championships	2	78.39	6	145.77	4	224.16
Feb 15–20, 2011	(Taiwan) 2011 Four Continents Championships	2	76.73	4	148.98	3	225.71

Results in the 2011–12 season
Date	Event	SP		FS		Total	
Date	Event	P	Score	P	Score	P	Score
Nov 3–6, 2011	2011 Cup of China	3	79.32	3	149.17	1	228.49
Nov 25–27, 2011	(Russia) 2011 Rostelecom Cup	1	83.54	5	145.54	3	229.08
Dec 8–11, 2011	(Canada) 2011–12 Grand Prix Final	2	82.66	5	156.16	5	238.82
Jan 22–29, 2012	(United States) 2012 U.S. Championships	1	90.23	1	183.35	1	273.58
Mar 8–11, 2012	(Netherlands) 2012 International Challenge Cup	3	77.97	2	145.81	2	223.78
Mar 26 – Apr 1, 2012	(France) 2012 World Championships	9	74.85	8	151.34	8	226.19
Apr 18–22, 2012	(Japan) 2012 World Team Trophy	3	86.98	7	147.39	5 (5)	234.37

Results in the 2012–13 season
Date	Event	SP		FS		Total	
Date	Event	P	Score	P	Score	P	Score
Oct 19–21, 2012	(United States) 2012 Skate America	3	77.71	8	133.64	5	211.35
Nov 16–18, 2012	(France) 2012 Trophée Éric Bompard	1	81.18	3	146.45	2	227.63
Jan 19–27, 2013	(United States) 2013 U.S. Championships	1	84.10	3	165.23	3	249.33
Apr 11–14, 2013	(Japan) 2013 World Team Trophy	4	80.24	6	151.60	1 (6)	231.84

Results in the 2013–14 season
Date	Event	SP		FS		Total	
Date	Event	P	Score	P	Score	P	Score
Oct 5, 2013	2013 Japan Open	—N/a	—N/a	3	157.70	2 (3)	—N/a
Oct 24–27, 2013	2013 Skate Canada International	4	74.58	6	141.37	6	215.95
Nov 8–10, 2013	(Japan) 2013 NHK Trophy	7	78.78	3	158.63	3	237.41
Jan 5–12, 2014	(United States) 2014 U.S. Championships	1	99.86	2	174.41	1	274.27
Feb 6–9, 2014	(Russia) 2014 Winter Olympics (Team event)	7	65.65	—N/a	—N/a	3	—N/a
Feb 7–23, 2014	(Russia) 2014 Winter Olympics	15	72.58	8	160.12	12	232.70
Mar 24–30, 2014	(Japan) 2014 World Championships	8	79.67	4	166.68	5	246.35

Results in the 2014–15 season
Date	Event	SP		FS		Total	
Date	Event	P	Score	P	Score	P	Score
Oct 24–26, 2014	(United States) 2014 Skate America	2	81.82	6	137.51	5	219.33
Nov 28–30, 2014	(Japan) 2014 NHK Trophy	2	81.51	5	148.14	5	229.65
Jan 18–25, 2015	(United States) 2015 U.S. Championships	3	89.93	5	168.36	5	258.29

Results in the 2015–16 season
Date	Event	SP		FS		Total	
Date	Event	P	Score	P	Score	P	Score
Oct 3, 2015	2015 Japan Open	—N/a	—N/a	3	153.72	2 (4)	—N/a
Jan 15, 2016	(Japan) 2016 Medal Winners Open	1	85.44	—N/a	—N/a	1	85.44

Results in the 2016–17 season
Date	Event	SP		FS		Total	
Date	Event	P	Score	P	Score	P	Score
Oct 1, 2016	2016 Japan Open	—N/a	—N/a	4	166.99	3 (4)	—N/a

Results in the 2017–18 season
Date	Event	SP		FS		Total	
Date	Event	P	Score	P	Score	P	Score
Oct 7, 2017	2017 Japan Open	—N/a	—N/a	5	143.48	3 (5)	—N/a

Results in the 2018–19 season
Date	Event	SP		FS		Total	
Date	Event	P	Score	P	Score	P	Score
Oct 6, 2018	2018 Japan Open	—N/a	—N/a	6	124.06	3 (6)	—N/a

=== Junior level ===
Results in the 2002–03 season
Date	Event	SP		FS		Total	
Date	Event	P	Score	P	Score	P	Score
Feb 21–23, 2003	(Denmark) 2003 Copenhagen Trophy	1	—N/a	3	—N/a	3	—N/a

Results in the 2003–04 season
Date	Event	SP		FS		Total	
Date	Event	P	Score	P	Score	P	Score
Jan 3–11, 2004	(United States) 2004 U.S. Championships (Junior)	10	—N/a	4	—N/a	7	—N/a

Results in the 2004–05 season
Date	Event	SP		FS		Total	
Date	Event	P	Score	P	Score	P	Score
Jan 9–16, 2005	(United States) 2005 U.S. Championships (Junior)	1	—N/a	1	—N/a	1	—N/a
