= Old Pine =

Old Pine may refer to:

- Old Pine (EP), an EP by Ben Howard
- Old Pine (song), a song by Ben Howard
