= Do You Wanna =

Do You Wanna may refer to:

- "Do You Wanna", a song by Gipsy.cz
- "Do You Wanna", a song by Modern Talking from The 1st Album, 1985
- "Do You Wanna", a song by The Stranglers from Black and White, 1978

== See also ==
- "Do You Want To", 2005 song by Franz Ferdinand
- "If You Wanna", a 2011 song by the Vaccines
