= Brit Awards 2013 =

British music awards ceremony

- Date: 20 February 2013
- Venue: The O2 Arena
- Hosted by: James Corden

Highlights
- Most awards: Emeli Sandé and Ben Howard (2)
- Most nominations: Emeli Sandé and Mumford & Sons (4)

Television/radio coverage
- Network: ITV
- Viewership: 6.5 million

Brit Awards 2013 was held on 20 February 2013. This was the 33rd edition of the British Phonographic Industry's annual Brit Awards. The awards ceremony was held at The O2 Arena in London, and was presented for the third time in three years by James Corden.

Leading the nominations were Mumford & Sons and Emeli Sandé with four nominations each, but Sandé and Ben Howard ended up as the most successful winners, with two awards each.

The statue for 2013 was designed by Damien Hirst. Coverage on ITV attracted more than 6.5 million viewers, with a peak of 7.5 million, the biggest audience for the awards in ten years.

== Performances ==
Artist(s)	Song(s)	UK Singles Chart Reaction (week ending 2 March 2013)	UK Albums Chart Reaction (week ending 2 March 2013)
Muse	"Supremacy"	58 (debut)	The 2nd Law – 23 (+33)
Robbie Williams	"Candy"	39 (+12)	Take the Crown – 42 (+9)
Justin Timberlake	"Mirrors"	4 (+24)	Justified – 84 (re-entry)
Taylor Swift	"I Knew You Were Trouble"	6 (+6)	Red – 7 (+18)
One Direction	"One Way or Another (Teenage Kicks)"	1 (debut)	Take Me Home – 14 (+1); Up All Night – 29 (+7)
Ben Howard	"Only Love"	9 (+181)	Every Kingdom – 4 (+42)
Mumford & Sons	"I Will Wait"	12 (+34)	Babel – 2 (+3); Sigh No More – 32 (+7)
Emeli Sandé	"Clown" "Next to Me"	10 (−1); 45 (re-entry)	Our Version of Events – 1 (+2)

== Winners and nominees ==
The nominations were announced on 10 January 2013 during the 2013 BRIT Awards Launch at the Savoy Hotel in London. The event was hosted by Nick Grimshaw

British Album of the Year (presented by Bryan Ferry)	British Producer of the Year
Emeli Sandé – Our Version of Events; Alt-J – An Awesome Wave; Mumford & Sons – Babel; Paloma Faith – Fall to Grace; Plan B – Ill Manors	Paul Epworth; Damon Albarn; Jake Gosling
British Single of the Year (presented by Tom Daley and Jonathan Ross)	British Live Act (presented by Louis Smith and Jack Whitehall)
Adele – "Skyfall"; Alex Clare – "Too Close"; Coldplay & Rihanna – "Princess of China"; DJ Fresh featuring Rita Ora – "Hot Right Now"; Emeli Sandé – "Next to Me"; Florence and the Machine – "Spectrum (Say My Name)"; James Arthur – "Impossible"; Jessie J – "Domino"; Labrinth featuring Emeli Sandé – "Beneath Your Beautiful"; Olly Murs featuring Flo Rida – "Troublemaker"; Rita Ora featuring Tinie Tempah – "R.I.P."; Rizzle Kicks – "Mama Do the Hump"; Robbie Williams – "Candy"; Rudimental featuring John Newman – "Feel the Love"; Stooshe – "Black Heart"	Coldplay; Mumford & Sons; Muse; The Rolling Stones; The Vaccines
British Male Solo Artist (presented by Ed Sheeran)	British Female Solo Artist (presented by Taylor Swift)
Ben Howard; Calvin Harris; Olly Murs; Plan B; Richard Hawley	Emeli Sandé; Amy Winehouse (Posthumous); Bat for Lashes; Jessie Ware; Paloma Faith
British Group (presented by Simon Pegg and Bérénice Marlohe)	British Breakthrough Act (presented by Nick Grimshaw)
Mumford & Sons; Alt-J; Muse; One Direction; The xx	Ben Howard; Alt-J; Jake Bugg; Jessie Ware; Rita Ora
International Male Solo Artist (presented by Jourdan Dunn and Rafe Spall)	International Female Solo Artist (presented by Dermot O'Leary and Sharon Osbourne)
Frank Ocean; Bruce Springsteen; Gotye; Jack White; Michael Bublé	Lana Del Rey; Alicia Keys; Cat Power; Rihanna; Taylor Swift
International Group (presented by Dave Grohl)	Critics' Choice Award
The Black Keys; Alabama Shakes; Fun.; The Killers; The Script	Tom Odell; AlunaGeorge; Laura Mvula
Global Success Award (presented by Robbie Williams)	Special Recognition (presented by Damon Albarn)
One Direction	War Child

== Multiple nominations and awards ==
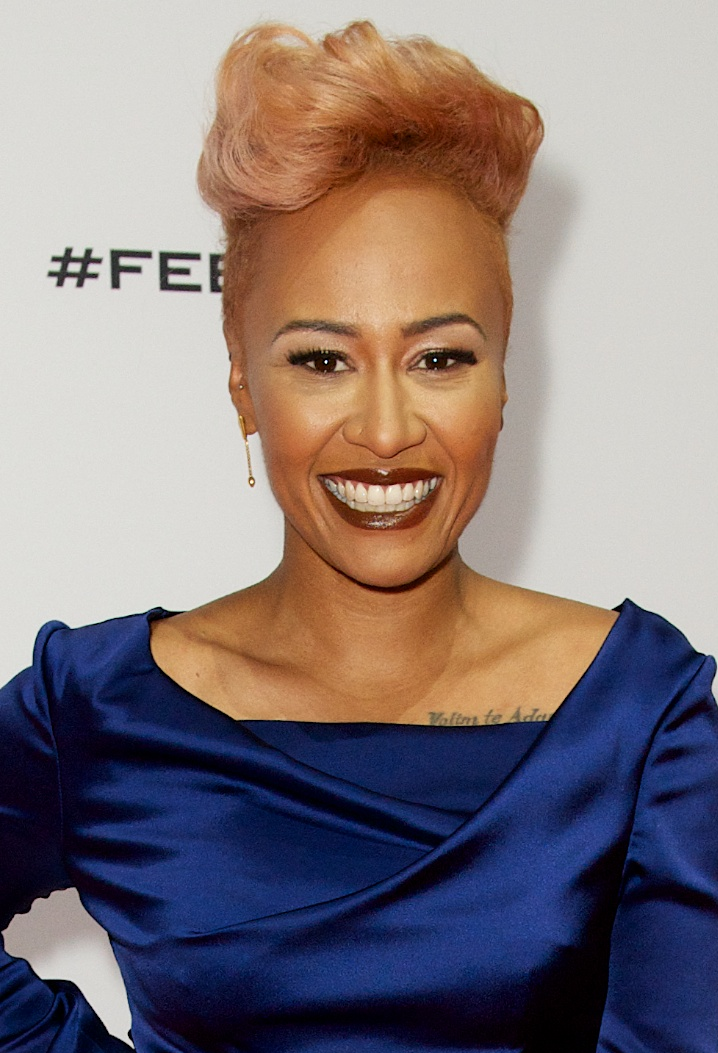
Two time winner Emeli Sandé as most nominations and awards

Artists that received multiple nominations
Nominations	Artist
4	Emeli Sandé
3 (3)	alt-J
3 (3)	Mumford & Sons
3 (3)	Rita Ora
2 (8)	Ben Howard
2 (8)	Coldplay
2 (8)	Jessie Ware
2 (8)	Muse
2 (8)	Olly Murs
2 (8)	Paloma Faith
2 (8)	Plan B
2 (8)	Rihanna

Artists that received multiple awards
Awards	Artist
2 (2)	Ben Howard
2 (2)	Emeli Sandé
