= Wreckin' Bar (Ra Ra Ra) / Blow It Up =

"Wreckin' Bar (Ra Ra Ra)" / "Blow It Up"

Single by The Vaccines

from the album What Did You Expect from the Vaccines?
- Released: 22 November 2010
- Recorded: 2010
- Genre: Post-punk revival, surf punk, indie rock, garage rock
- Length: 1:24
- Label: Marshall Teller
- Songwriter: The Vaccines
- Producer: Dan Grech-Marguerat

The Vaccines singles chronology
"Wreckin' Bar (Ra Ra Ra)" / "Blow It Up" (2010)	"Post Break-Up Sex" (2011)

"Wreckin' Bar (Ra Ra Ra)" / "Blow It Up" is the debut single by English indie rock band the Vaccines. It was released in the United Kingdom on 22 November 2010 through Marshall Teller Records, where it debuted on the UK Singles Chart at number 157. The track was named Zane Lowe's "Hottest Record in the World" on 6 October 2010 alongside the accompanying track "Blow It Up".

== Track listing ==
Digital download
No.	Title	Length
1.	"Wreckin' Bar (Ra Ra Ra)" (Single Version)	1:24
2.	"Blow It Up"	2:40

== Music video ==
=== "Wreckin' Bar (Ra Ra Ra)" ===
During November 2010, the band released an accompanying music video for the release of "Wreckin' Bar (Ra Ra Ra)". The 82 second video features a performance of the song; seen on a ball that spins clockwise for the first minute of the video at varying speeds, before alternating to anti-clockwise for the remaining duration of the video.

=== "Blow It Up" ===
Alongside the release of the "Wreckin' Bar (Ra Ra Ra)" video, the band also released another for the second half of the double A-side: "Blow It Up". The 2 minute 24 second video features a performance of the song; aided in the use of bold lighting and varying blue backgrounds; all the while concealing the faces of the band members. During differing points in the video, a spotlight is pointed towards a certain band member; putting emphasis on the performing of instruments.

== Critical reception ==
Simon Butcher of Q Magazine gave the song a positive review stating:

When summing up this group's spirit in one word you would have to choose urgency, having only been together four months and deciding to debut with a song that clocks in at one minute 24 seconds. Sounding like the musical equivalent of a Usain Bolt sprint, this track has all the power and drive to make the simile worthy of using. Let's just hope we don't see another band with huge potential hit the finish line too soon.

== Chart performance ==
Following the release of the double A-side on 22 November 2010, "Wreckin' Bar (Ra Ra Ra)" and "Blow It Up" charted together on the UK Singles Chart at number 157 on 28 November 2010.

Chart (2010)	Peak position
UK Singles (OCC)	157

== Use in media ==
"Wreckin' Bar (Ra Ra Ra)" was used in the British teen drama Skins during "Franky", the first episode of series 5. It also been used on FIFA 12 the video game by EA Sports as part of the official soundtrack, and in the American comedy-drama Girls, as the exiting track of the eighth episode of the first season. It was also used on Soccer AM during their weekly army feature, which involved soldiers having a picture taken of them, more often than not, in their favourite team's shirt. As well as this it was used in the US series Teen Wolf in the third episode of the first season.

== Release history ==
Region	Date	Format
United Kingdom	21 November 2010	Digital download
United Kingdom	22 November 2010	Vinyl
