= Only Love (Ben Howard song) =

Single by Ben Howard

from the album Every Kingdom
- Released: 4 May 2012
- Recorded: 2011
- Genre: Folk; indie folk; reggae folk
- Length: 4:09
- Label: Island
- Songwriter: Ben Howard
- Producers: Chris Bond; Darren Lawson

Ben Howard singles chronology
"The Wolves" (2012)	"Only Love" (2012)	"Old Pine (Everything Everything Remix)" (2012)

Music video
- "Only Love" on YouTube

"Only Love" is a song by the English singer-songwriter Ben Howard from his debut studio album Every Kingdom (2011). It was released as a single in the United Kingdom on 4 May 2012 as a digital download and on CD. It entered the UK singles chart at No. 80 and rose to No. 37 the following week. The song was written by Ben Howard and produced by Chris Bond and Darren Lawson. The cover art was designed by Owen Tozer. A live performance of the song at the Brit Awards 2013 where Howard won two awards, was released on 20 February 2013 as a digital download single. This version helped the single reach its peak chart position of 9.

== Music video ==
A music video to accompany the release of "Only Love" was released onto YouTube on 8 May 2012 with a total length of three minutes and fifty-three seconds, in colour, at a variety of resolutions, running at twenty-five frames per second (progressive scan).

== Track listing ==
Digital download
No.	Title	Length
1.	"Only Love"	4:09
2.	"Only Love" (Roni Size Remix)	4:23
Total length:		8:32

Live at the BRITs 2013
No.	Title	Length
1.	"Only Love (Live at the BRITs 2013)"	3:40
Total length:		3:40

== Chart performance ==
=== Weekly charts ===
Chart (2011–13)	Peak position
Ireland (IRMA)	37
Scottish Singles Sales (Official Charts)	9
UK Singles (Official Charts)	9
UK Streaming Chart	23
US Hot Rock & Alternative Songs (Billboard)	49
US Adult Alternative Airplay (Billboard)	6

=== Year-end charts ===
Chart (2013)	Position
UK Singles (Official Charts Company)	131
US Adult Alternative Songs (Billboard)	45

== Certifications ==
Region	Certification	Certified units/sales
Australia (ARIA)	2× Platinum	140,000^{‡}
Brazil (Pro-Música Brasil)	Gold	30,000^{‡}
Denmark (IFPI Danmark)	Gold	45,000^{‡}
New Zealand (RMNZ)	Platinum	30,000^{‡}
United Kingdom (BPI)	Platinum	600,000^{‡}
^{‡} Sales+streaming figures based on certification alone.

== Release history ==
Country	Release Date	Format	Label
United Kingdom	4 May 2012	Digital Download, CD	Island
