= These Waters =

These Waters EP

EP by Ben Howard
- Released: 7 July 2009
- Recorded: 2009
- Genre: Singer-songwriter, folk, indie
- Length: 26:09
- Label: Dualtone
- Producer: Dan Gautreau, Patch Rowland

Ben Howard chronology
Games in the Dark EP (2008)	These Waters EP (2009)	Old Pine EP (2011)

These Waters is an EP by the English singer-songwriter Ben Howard. It was released on 7 July 2009 as a digital download and on CD, but is no longer available for purchase. The songs on the EP were written by Howard and produced by Dan Gautreau, except for "Cloud Nine", which was produced by Patch Rowland. The cover art was designed by Owen Tozer, based on paintings by Carole Hodgson. Early releases of the EP included a limited edition Quiksilver/Surfers Against Sewage T-shirt and screen print.

== Track listing ==
No.	Title	Length
1.	"The Wolves"	4:12
2.	"Cloud Nine"	3:28
3.	"London"	5:20
4.	"These Waters"	3:30
5.	"Move Like You Want"	4:05
6.	"The Fire (Bonus Track)"	5:34
Total length:		26:09

The song "The Wolves" was re-recorded for the studio album Every Kingdom, which was released on 30 September 2011. The deluxe edition of the album also includes a re-recording of "These Waters" and a live version of "Move Like You Want". A live version of the song "London" was included on the Ben Howard Live EP, which was released in May 2011.

== Release history ==
Country	Release date	Format	Label
United Kingdom	7 July 2009	Digital download, CD	Dualtone
