= Keep Your Head Up (Ben Howard song) =

Single by Ben Howard

from the album Every Kingdom
- Released: 26 August 2011
- Recorded: 2011
- Genre: Folk, indie folk
- Length: 4:22
- Label: Island
- Songwriter: Ben Howard

Ben Howard singles chronology
"The Wolves" (2011)	"Keep Your Head Up" (2011)	"The Fear" (2012)

"Keep Your Head Up" is a song by British singer-songwriter Ben Howard from his debut studio album Every Kingdom. It was released as a single in the United Kingdom on 26 August 2011 as a digital download. It reached a peak UK Singles Chart position of 74. The song was written by Ben Howard. The cover art was designed by Owen Tozer. It is a re-recording of the original version found on the Games in the Dark EP.

The song was voted to be 3VOOR12 song of the year on the Dutch radio station 3FM.

== Music video ==
A music video to accompany the release of "Keep Your Head Up" was released onto YouTube on 18 August 2011 with a total length of three minutes and fifty-five seconds. The video is also included on the deluxe edition of the studio album Every Kingdom.

== Track listing ==
No.	Title	Length
1.	"Keep Your Head Up"	4:22
2.	"Depth over Distance"	4:48
Total length:		9:10

== Chart performance ==
Chart (2011)	Peak Position
UK Singles Chart	46
UK Streaming Chart	65
Belgian Chart (Wallonia)	28
Belgian Chart (Flanders)	87
Dutch Chart	14
German Chart	68
U.S. Billboard Adult Alternative	15

== Certifications ==
Region	Certification	Certified units/sales
Australia (ARIA)	Platinum	70,000^{‡}
Germany (BVMI)	Gold	150,000^{‡}
New Zealand (RMNZ)	Platinum	30,000^{‡}
United Kingdom (BPI)	Platinum	600,000^{‡}
^{‡} Sales+streaming figures based on certification alone.

== Release history ==
Country	Release date	Format	Label
United Kingdom	26 August 2011	Digital Download	Island

== Covers ==
Sandra van Nieuwland covered the song on The Voice of Holland. It was released as a single in The Netherlands on 17 November 2012 as a digital download. It reached number one in the Mega Single Top 100 and the Dutch Top 40. British post-hardcore band Enter Shikari covered the song as part of a live session on Huw Stephens' show on BBC Radio 1.
