= Medal Winners Open =

The Medal Winners Open is an invitational pro-am figure skating competition organized by the Japan Skating Federation and sanctioned by the International Skating Union (ISU). Medals are awarded in the disciplines of Men's and Ladies' singles. The invited skaters should have won a medal in a major ISU competition such as Olympics, Worlds, Europeans, 4CC, and Grand Prix Final.

Each skater performs an ISU free skating program in a modified format which emphasizes artistic merit. The program duration is 3 minutes and 30 seconds +/- 10 seconds for men and 3 minutes +/- 10 seconds for ladies. Three jump passes, three spins, and a choreographic sequence should be performed. One of the jump passes can be a two-jump combination or a sequence of jumps. Vocal music, theatrical lighting, and small props are allowed.

== 2017 ==
In place of Medal Winners Open, the promoters presented Medal Winners Gala on January 14, 2017 in Yokohama, Japan.

== 2016 ==
The third competition was held on January 15, 2016 in Osaka, Japan.

=== Men ===
Rank	Name	Points	Program
1	(United States) Jeremy Abbott	85.44	Bring Him Home (from Les Misérables) by Claude-Michel Schönberg
2	(Japan) Nobunari Oda	83.82	Liebesträume by Franz Liszt
3	(Canada) Jeffrey Buttle	72.76	Cry Me a River by Arthur Hamilton, covered by Michael Bublé
4	(United States) Johnny Weir	70.30	Masquerade (waltz) by Aram Khachaturian
5	(Russia) Ilia Kulik	69.67	Fantasy for Violin and Orchestra (from Ladies in Lavender) by Nigel Hess

=== Ladies ===
Rank	Name	Points	Program
1	(Canada) Joannie Rochette	71.27	Gravity by Sara Bareilles
2	(Italy) Carolina Kostner	59.69	Méditation (Thaïs) by Jules Massenet
3	(Japan) Miki Ando	54.13	Ballade No. 4 (Chopin) by Frédéric Chopin
4	(Japan) Yuka Sato	50.44	Say you Love Me
5	(United States) Kimmie Meissner	45.12	Chandelier

== 2015 ==
The second competition was held on January 16, 2015 in Tokyo, Japan.

=== Men ===
Rank	Name	Points	Program
1	(Russia) Evgeny Plushenko	86.95	Je suis malade by Serge Lama
2	(Japan) Nobunari Oda	85.15	Adiós Nonino by Astor Piazzolla
3	(Canada) Jeffrey Buttle	77.28	Here's to Life by Shirley Horn
4	(United States) Johnny Weir	75.14	Ave Maria païen by Riccardo Cocciante, Luc Plamondon
5	(United States) Evan Lysacek	73.32	El Tango de Roxanne (from Moulin Rouge!) by Sting, Mariano Mores
6	(Japan) Takeshi Honda	50.41	Romeo and Juliet by Nino Rota

=== Ladies ===
Rank	Name	Points	Program
1	(Canada) Joannie Rochette	64.67	La Vie en rose covered by Ute Lemper
2	(Switzerland) Sarah Meier	54.89	Amélie Medley by Yann Tiersen
3	(Japan) Miki Ando	54.10	Ballade No. 4 (Chopin) by Frédéric Chopin
4	(Finland) Laura Lepisto	52.94	Lohtu
5	(Russia) Irina Slutskaya	50.63	All by Myself covered by Celine Dion
6	(United States) Kimmie Meissner	45.56	Over the Rainbow covered by Eva Cassidy

== 2012 ==
The inaugural competition was held on October 5, 2012 in Saitama, Japan.

=== Men ===
Rank	Name	Points	Program
1	(Canada) Jeffrey Buttle	83.40	In This Shirt by The Irrepressibles
2	(Canada) Kurt Browning	71.57	Singin' in the Rain
3	(Russia) Ilia Kulik	69.93	Kashmir by Led Zeppelin
4	(Japan) Takeshi Honda	69.32	Toska - E lucevan le stelle by Giacomo Puccini
5	(Russia) Alexei Yagudin	69.10	Burn My Shadow by Unkle
6	(France) Philippe Candeloro	51.63	D'Artagnan by Maxime Rodriguez

=== Ladies ===
Rank	Name	Points	Program
1	(Japan) Shizuka Arakawa	64.80	Swan Lake (modern version) by Kryzler & Kompany
2	(Canada) Joannie Rochette	63.47	For Me, Formidable by France d'Amour
3	(Russia) Irina Slutskaya	61.97	Le cocher de la troika by Paul Mauriat
4	(Switzerland) Sarah Meier	54.53	Not Myself Tonight by Christina Aguilera
5	(Finland) Laura Lepisto	52.98	Malaguena (fandangos)
6	(United States) Kimmie Meissner	51.90	Romeo and Juliet by Nino Rota
