= Is It? =

Studio album by Ben Howard
- Released: 16 June 2023
- Studio: Le Manoir de Léon (Léon, Landes); Real World Studios (Box, Wiltshire)
- Length: 42:13
- Label: Island
- Producer: Nathan Jenkins

Ben Howard chronology
Collections from the Whiteout (2021)	Is It? (2023)

Singles from Is It?
- 1. "Couldn't Make It Up" Released: 20 April 2023; 2. "Walking Backwards" Released: 19 May 2023; 3. "Life in the Time" Released: 7 June 2023

Is It? is the fifth studio album by the English singer-songwriter Ben Howard, released on 16 June 2023 via Island Records.

== Background and recording ==
The album was created before and after Howard suffered two transient ischaemic attacks in 2022. The strokes, which affected his memory and speech, influenced Howard's songwriting on the album. Created with DJ-producer Nathan Jenkins (aka Bullion), the album features a distinctly electronic leaning. Glitches and loops populate the mix alongside "radiant" guitar ripples. The album combines treated vocals and atmospheric drum machines, to "create the story" of Howard's experience. The opening track playfully recalls this experience. The interlude "Total Eclipse" features manipulated language to render the effect.

The album was recorded at Le Manoir de Léon in Léon, Landes, France; and at Real World Studios in Box, Wiltshire, England.

== Release ==
The lead single from the album, "Couldn't Make It Up", was released on 20 April 2023, with the album announced the same day. A second single "Walking Backwards" was released 19 May 2023. The third single, "Life in the Time", was released on 7 June 2023.

== Critical reception ==
Professional ratings
Aggregate scores
Source	Rating
Metacritic	84/100
Review scores
Source	Rating
Clash	8/10
i	3/5 stars
Sputnikmusic	4.2/5
Uncut	8/10
XS Noize	4/5 stars

At Metacritic, which assigns a normalized rating out of 100 to reviews from professional publications, the album received an average score of 84, based on 4 reviews.

Stephen Dalton of Uncut commended the album's experimentation and deemed it "gloriously scrambled avant-pop", comparing Howard's vocals to those of Arthur Russell.

== Track listing ==
Is It? track listing
No.	Title	Writer(s)	Length
1.	"Couldn't Make It Up"	Ben Howard; Mickey Smith	3:55
2.	"Walking Backwards"	Howard; Nathan Jenkins; Smith	5:19
3.	"Days of Lantana"	Howard; Smith	5:15
4.	"Life in the Time"	Howard; Smith	3:30
5.	"Moonraker"	Howard; Jenkins; Smith	4:26
6.	"Richmond Avenue"	Howard; Michael McGoldrick; Smith	5:14
7.	"Interim of Sense"	Howard; Jenkins; Smith	3:56
8.	"Total Eclipse"	Howard; Smith	1:30
9.	"Spirit"	Howard; Jenkins; Smith	5:10
10.	"Little Plant"	Howard; Jenkins; Smith	3:58
Total length:			42:13

Notes

- "Days of Lantana" contains a sample of "Trois Beaux Oiseaux De Paradis", as written by Maurice Ravel and performed by Linda Thompson.

== Personnel ==
Credits adapted from Tidal.

- Ben Howard – vocals (all tracks), guitar (1–7, 9, 10), electric guitar (6), aerophones (9), electro-acoustic realization (9)
- Nathan Jenkins – synthesizer (1–7, 9, 10), programming (1, 2), background vocals (2, 5, 10), drum programming (3–10), production (all tracks), mixing (all tracks)
- Mickey Smith – guitar (1, 2, 3, 4, 5, 7), bass guitar (1, 2, 4–7, 9, 10), percussion (1, 7, 10), baritone (1), tape realization (1, 8, 10), background vocals (1, 6, 10), drums (5)
- Richard Thomas – synthesizer (1–5, 7, 9, 10), background vocals (1, 6, 10), harmonium (3), piano (7, 8, 10)
- James Arben – bass clarinet (1), saxophone (2), oboe (3)
- Raven Bush – strings (2, 4–6, 9, 10)
- Nat Wason – guitar (4, 6–8), lap steel guitar (5)
- Michael McGoldrick – uilleann pipes (6), flute (9)
- Stuart Hawkes – mastering (all tracks)
- Bráulio Amado – artwork
- Allan Wilson – photography
- Roddy Bow – photography

== Charts ==
Chart performance for Is It?
Chart (2023)	Peak position
Belgian Albums (Ultratop Flanders)	45
Dutch Albums (Album Top 100)	55
German Albums (Offizielle Top 100)	66
Scottish Albums (OCC)	8
UK Albums (OCC)	17
