= Collections from the Whiteout =

Studio album by Ben Howard
- Released: 26 March 2021
- Studio: Long Pond, New York; La Frette, Paris; Devon
- Genre: Indie rock; folktronica
- Length: 54:01
- Label: Island
- Producer: Aaron Dessner; Ben Howard

Ben Howard chronology
| Noonday Dream (2018) | Collections from the Whiteout (2021) | Is It? (2023) |

Singles from Collections from the Whiteout
- 1. "What a Day" Released: 26 January 2021; 2. "Crowhurst's Meme" Released: 2 February 2021; 3. "Far Out" / "Follies Fixture" Released: 26 February 2021; 4. "Sorry Kid" Released: 22 March 2021

Collections from the Whiteout is the fourth studio album by the English singer-songwriter Ben Howard, released on 26 March 2021 by Island Records.

== Singles ==
The lead single from the album, "What a Day", premiered on Annie Mac's BBC Radio 1 show on 26 January 2021. A second single "Crowhurst's Meme" was released 2 February 2021. The third and fourth singles, "Far Out" and "Follies Fixture" were released on 26 February 2021. The fifth single, "Sorry Kid" premiered on Annie Mac’s show on 22 March 2021.

== Critical reception ==
Professional ratings
Aggregate scores
| Source | Rating |
|---|---|
| AnyDecentMusic? | 7.2/10 |
| Metacritic | 69/100 |
Review scores
| Source | Rating |
| The AU Review | 4/5 stars |
| DIY | 4/5 stars |
| The Independent | 4/5 stars |
| The Line of Best Fit | 7/10 |
| Mojo | 4/5 stars |
| NME | 3/5 stars |
| Pitchfork | 6.9/10 |
| Uncut | 5/10 |

The album was met with positive reviews from music critics. On Metacritic, which assigns a rating out of 100, the album was scored a 69, which indicates generally favourable reviews. Ben Lynch of DIY Magazine gave the album 4 stars, calling the album "Melancholy, meticulous and achingly grand", elaborating that "His dialling down the traditional guitar/vocal folk and diving deeper into a range of electronics, whether the harsh distortion of ‘Sage That She Was Burning’ or the bright, tactile ‘Metaphysical Cantations’, is a primary deviation here. ‘Follies Fixture’, the opener and a highlight, expresses this newfound path from the onset, its entrancing swirl likely to divide fans while potentially turning a few new heads his way. Make no mistake though, Collections From The Whiteout remains in the truest sense a Ben Howard release." The Independent's Roisin O'Connor and Rachel Brodsky say that "instead of a too-many-cooks situation, which this easily could’ve been, [producer Aaron Dessner] and Howard find cozy nooks for everyone. The singer’s reedy voice is the drawstring that ties it all together." Hannah Jocelyn of Pitchfork gave the album 6.9 out of 10, saying that "Whiteout doesn’t always sound like a revelation, but it allows Howard to open up, letting in new lyrical and musical ideas that complement his own without overwhelming them."

Other reviews were less positive. John Murphy of musicOMH.com gave the album 3 stars, explaining that "there’s certainly a lot to take in on Ben Howard’s fourth album – not all the ideas work in fairness, and there’s a few too many moments which feel like half-sketched ideas. Yet Dessner makes a decent foil for him and for those who have joined Howard on his career journey to date will be more than happy to continue travelling with him." PopMatters' Brice Ezell gave the album 6 out of 10, saying that "if Whiteout is an imperfect album, it is one that also evinces Howard’s refusal to stay in a single musical lane."

== Commercial performance ==
Collections from the Whiteout spent its first week of release at number one on the UK Albums Chart (with first-week sales of 15,621 copies, including 1,759 from sales-equivalent streams). Unusually for a number one album, it recorded no other weeks in the chart.

== Track listing ==
Collections from the Whiteout track listing
| No. | Title | Writer(s) | Length |
|---|---|---|---|
| 1. | "Follies Fixture" | Ben Howard | 3:59 |
| 2. | "What a Day" | Howard; Aaron Dessner | 5:15 |
| 3. | "Crowhurst's Meme" | Howard; Yussef Dayes | 3:44 |
| 4. | "Finders Keepers" | Howard; Dessner | 2:49 |
| 5. | "Far Out" | Howard; Dessner | 4:18 |
| 6. | "Rookery" | Howard | 2:31 |
| 7. | "You Have Your Way" | Howard | 4:25 |
| 8. | "Sage That She Was Burning" | Howard; Dessner; Dayes | 4:17 |
| 9. | "Sorry Kid" | Howard; Dessner | 4:59 |
| 10. | "Unfurling" | Howard; Dessner | 3:40 |
| 11. | "Metaphysical Cantations" | Howard; Dessner | 4:21 |
| 12. | "Make Arrangements" | Howard; Dessner | 4:25 |
| 13. | "The Strange Last Flight of Richard Russell" | Howard; Dessner; Dayes | 4:23 |
| 14. | "Buzzard" | Howard | 0:55 |
| Total length: | | | 54:01 |

Vinyl extra tracks
| No. | Title | Length |
|---|---|---|
| 15. | "Rumble Strip" | 3:00 |
| 16. | "London Portrait" | 2:29 |

== Personnel ==
Credits are adapted from the album's liner notes.

Musicians

- Ben Howard – primary artist, guitar, producer
- Aaron Dessner – producer, guitar, piano
- Mickey Smith – acoustic guitar, dulcimer
- Nat Wason – electric guitar
- Richard Thomas – keyboard, synthesizer
- Ryan Olson – sound effects
- Rob Moose – viola, violin
- James Krivchenia – drums, percussion
- Yussef Dayes – drums
- Kate Stables – vocals
- Thomas Bartlett – synthesizer
- India Bourne – cello
- Jason Treuting – drums, percussion
- Kyle Keegan – drums

Production

- Jonathan Low – engineer, mixing
- Greg Calbi – mastering
- Roddy Bow – artwork

== Charts ==
Chart performance for Collections from the Whiteout
| Chart (2021) | Peak position |
|---|---|
| Belgian Albums (Ultratop Flanders) | 14 |
| Belgian Albums (Ultratop Wallonia) | 78 |
| Dutch Albums (Album Top 100) | 9 |
| German Albums (Offizielle Top 100) | 19 |
| Irish Albums (OCC) | 17 |
| Scottish Albums (OCC) | 1 |
| Swiss Albums (Schweizer Hitparade) | 81 |
| UK Albums (OCC) | 1 |
