= All in White =

Single by the Vaccines

from the album What Did You Expect from The Vaccines?
- Released: 5 June 2011
- Recorded: 2010
- Genre: Indie rock
- Length: 4:39
- Label: Columbia Records
- Songwriter(s): The Vaccines
- Producer(s): Dan Grech-Marguerat

The Vaccines singles chronology
"If You Wanna" (2011)	"All in White" (2011)	"Nørgaard" (2011)

"All in White" is a single by English indie rock band the Vaccines, the fourth to be released from their first album, What Did You Expect from The Vaccines?.

== Music video ==
A music video to accompany the release of "All in White" was released onto YouTube on 18 May 2011, at a total length of four minutes and thirty-nine seconds.

== Track listing ==
Digital download
No.	Title	Length
1.	"All in White"	4:39
2.	"Tuck and Roll"	3:19

== Credits and personnel ==
- Lead vocals – The Vaccines
- Producers – Dan Grech-Marguerat
- Lyrics – The Vaccines
- Label: Columbia Records

== Chart performance ==
Chart (2011)	Peak position
Belgium (Ultratip Bubbling Under Flanders)	40

== Release history ==
Region	Date	Format	Label
United Kingdom	5 June 2011	Digital Download	Columbia Records
