= The Burgh Island EP =

The Burgh Island E.P.

EP by Ben Howard
- Released: 31 October 2012
- Recorded: 2012
- Genre: Folk; indie folk
- Length: 23:35
- Label: Island
- Producer: Chris Bond

Ben Howard chronology
Every Kingdom (2011)	The Burgh Island E.P. (2012)	I Forget Where We Were (2014)

The Burgh Island E.P. is an extended play (EP) by the English singer-songwriter Ben Howard. It was released on 31 October 2012 as a digital download, on CD and on 12" EP. The songs on the EP were written by Howard and produced by Chris Bond. The cover art was designed by Owen Tozer. The 12" EP release was limited to 1000 copies, and is a single-sided vinyl disc; the EP included a voucher for the digital download. The CD was not sold, but issued for promotion only.

The song "Oats in the Water" was used in the fifth episode of Season 4 of The Walking Dead television series. It was also used in the Launch Trailer for the video game "The Witcher 3 Wild Hunt". Moreover, it was used in the sixth episode of The Innocents television series.

== Music video ==
To accompany the release of the EP, a music video for "Esmerelda" was released on YouTube on 30 October 2012.

== Track listing ==
No.	Title	Length
1.	"Esmerelda"	4:44
2.	"Oats in the Water"	4:59
3.	"To Be Alone"	5:37
4.	"Burgh Island" (featuring Monica Heldal)	8:15
Total length:		23:35

== Release history ==
Country	Release date	Format	Label
United Kingdom	31 October 2012	Digital download, CD, LP	Island
