= Noonday Dream =

Studio album by Ben Howard
- Released: 1 June 2018
- Genre: Indie folk; psychedelic folk
- Length: 50:25
- Label: Island

Ben Howard chronology
I Forget Where We Were (2014)	Noonday Dream (2018)	Collections from the Whiteout (2021)

Singles from Noonday Dream
- 1. "A Boat to an Island on the Wall" Released: 5 April 2018; 2. "Towing the Line" Released: 17 April 2018; 3. "Nica Libres at Dusk" Released: 27 April 2018

Noonday Dream is the third album by the English singer-songwriter Ben Howard, released on 1 June 2018.

== Critical reception ==
Professional ratings
Aggregate scores
Source	Rating
Metacritic	80/100
Review scores
Source	Rating
Allmusic	4/5 stars
The Independent	5/5 stars
DIY	4/5 stars
Uncut	4/5 stars
Sputnikmusic	5/5
Mojo	8/10
The Line of Best Fit	7/10
NME	6/10
Q Magazine	4/5 stars

"Noonday Dream" has received generally favorable reviews from critics. At Metacritic, which assigns a normalised rating out of 100 to reviews from mainstream publications, the album received an average score of 80 based on 11 reviews. In a perfect review, Roisin O'Connor of The Independent says that "On [Noonday Dream], Howard expands the Cornish landscape that has impacted his previous work and brings in sounds and instruments that spark the imagination to places further afield, in the most exquisite way. Opener 'Nica Libres at Dusk' is a walk in shimmering heat, dust kicked from underfoot, with Howard’s voice singing dirge-like on the verses then drawn sweetly out like smoke from the cigars on the chorus; somehow evoking the soaring eagles depicted in the lyrics through a high whine on the electric guitar. 'The Defeat' features what sounds like a didgeridoo that thrums low beneath the clash of symbols and Howard’s lyrics contemplating: 'Where does the robber go, where does the robber go to repent?'". Sputnikmusic also gave the album a perfect score, saying that "[Noonday Dream is] Ben Howard doubling down on ambiance, creating a collage of moments both fleeting and everlasting while choosing the art of the craft over the simplest path to accolades. It may take more time to appreciate, but it’s a masterclass of songwriting that will likely dictate the future direction of his music." James Christopher Monger of AllMusic gave the album a 4-star review, saying that "Rolling in like fog on the Atlantic, the aptly named Noonday Dream is an inward-looking and unassuming batch of ambient folk songs that still manages to invoke huge vistas... the over seven-minute 'A Boat to an Island on the Wall,' with its murmuring ambient noises and occasional bursts of background conversation, would almost give off a Final Cut-era Pink Floyd vibe if it weren't so subtle, and the heartfelt and hazy 'Towing the Line' delivers one of Howard's most engaging melodies to date. Noonday Dream can feel ephemeral at times, but never is it unpleasant, even when it's fishing for emotional truth in unstable waters. Introspection rarely feels this inclusive."

Brice Ezell of PopMatters gave the album a rating of 6/10. He says, "As was the case on I Forget Where We Were, Howard strays just far enough from the more straightforward acoustic arrangements of Every Kingdom that the music feels dull and shapeless when it shouldn’t need to be. Dusty deserts give Howard plenty to work with here, but there is a risk of getting stranded out in such parched terrain. For all the times where Noonday Dream gets, well, a little too dreamy, “Nica Libres at Dusk” demonstrates further possibility for Howard’s songwriting. If he’s able to marry his chops with acoustic instruments to his penchant for electronic and ambient music, without letting one take precedence over the other, he’d be on his way to a masterpiece that, at their best, each of his three records thus far has hinted at." NME's Hannah Mylrea gave the album 3 stars, saying that "at times, it’s truly gorgeous; but at others: it’s bloody hard work... Howard’s first two records revealed him to be an extraordinarily talented song-writer, unafraid to make radical musical decisions; but the path he’s followed for Noonday Dream is a disappointing one. Monotonous and self-interested, it’s a disappointing listen from one of Britain’s most interesting song-writers."

=== Accolades ===
Publication	Accolade	Rank
Radio X	Best Albums Of 2018	—N/a
The Independent	The 40 best albums of 2018	11

== Commercial performance ==
Noonday Dream has sold 42,207 copies in the UK, as of March 2021.

== Track listing ==
All tracks are written by Ben Howard, except where noted.

No.	Title	Writer(s)	Length
1.	"Nica Libres at Dusk"		6:34
2.	"Towing the Line"		3:55
3.	"A Boat to an Island on the Wall"		7:10
4.	"What the Moon Does"		5:21
5.	"Someone in the Doorway"		4:56
6.	"All Down the Mines (Interlude)"		0:47
7.	"The Defeat"	Howard; India Bourne; Kyle Keegan; Mickey Smith; Richard Thomas; Nat Wason	5:53
8.	"A Boat to an Island, Part II / Agatha's Song"		4:54
9.	"There's Your Man"	Howard; Smith	4:39
10.	"Murmurations"	Howard; Smith	6:16
Total length:			50:25

Vinyl extra tracks
No.	Title	Length
11.	"Bird on a Wing"	5:10
12.	"Interlude"	1:16

== Personnel ==
Credits adapted from AllMusic.

Musicians

- Ben Howard – primary artist, guitar, producer
- India Bourne – cello, piano
- Kyle Keegan – drums
- Mickey Smith – guitar
- Richard Thomas – guitar
- Gillian Maguire – viola
- Agatha Lintott – backing vocals
- Owain Davies – backing vocals

Production

- John Cornfield – engineer
- Huntley Miller – mastering
- Chris Elms – mixing
- Roddy Bow – artwork

== Charts ==
=== Weekly charts ===
Chart (2018)	Peak position
Australian Albums (ARIA)	23
Austrian Albums (Ö3 Austria)	38
Belgian Albums (Ultratop Flanders)	14
Belgian Albums (Ultratop Wallonia)	100
Canadian Albums (Billboard)	61
Czech Albums (ČNS IFPI)	90
Dutch Albums (Album Top 100)	10
German Albums (Offizielle Top 100)	17
Irish Albums (IRMA)	12
New Zealand Albums (RMNZ)	38
Scottish Albums (OCC)	5
Swiss Albums (Schweizer Hitparade)	39
UK Albums (OCC)	4
US Billboard 200	138
US Americana/Folk Albums (Billboard)	5
US Top Rock Albums (Billboard)	25

=== Year-end charts ===
Chart (2018)	Position
Belgian Albums (Ultratop Flanders)	96
