= I Forget Where We Were =

Studio album by Ben Howard
- Released: 20 October 2014
- Recorded: 2014
- Studio: Start Point Farm Studios (Devon)
- Genre: Folk; indie folk; ambient; shoegaze
- Length: 54:11
- Label: Island (UK); Tôt ou Tard (France); Republic (US)
- Producer: Chris Bond

Ben Howard chronology
The Burgh Island E.P. (2012)	I Forget Where We Were (2014)	Noonday Dream (2018)

Singles from I Forget Where We Were
- 1. "I Forget Where We Were" Released: 19 August 2014; 2. "End of the Affair" Released: 26 August 2014; 3. "Conrad" Released: 17 September 2014

I Forget Where We Were is the second studio album by the English singer-songwriter Ben Howard, released on 20 October 2014 by Island Records. It was produced by Howard's drummer Chris Bond at Start Point Farm Studios in Devon, and recorded almost completely live.

Following the success of his debut studio album Every Kingdom (2011), it peaked at number-one on the UK Albums Chart, and the Scottish Albums Chart. It also peaked at number two in Belgium, and the Netherlands, and the top ten in Ireland, New Zealand, and Australia.

== Critical reception ==
The album was met with positive reviews from music critics. On Metacritic, which assigns a rating out of 100, the album was scored a 77, which indicates generally favourable reviews. MusicOMH's Graeme Marsh gave the album 4 and a half stars, saying "I Forget Where We Were is an album to grow into rather than one of instant satisfaction, one that blossoms upon every subsequent listen, one to clutch close to your heart and cherish forever." Henry Boon of DIY gave the album 4 stars, saying "...for those who didn’t care for Every Kingdom, it may also be easy to write off I Forget Where We Were as just another lame indie-folk album. On closer inspection however, it actually forgoes both attitudes; this album is more complex, more imaginative and technically worlds away from Every Kingdom." He explains, "The crowning glory lays with the lead single 'End of the Affair', an eight minute perfectly subtle build of complex classical guitar and strained emotive vocals." In a 3-and-a-half star review, Stephen Thomas Erlewine of AllMusic says that "Howard expects you to meet him on his own terms and provides just enough aural enticement to give him not just one listen but a second, which is when I Forget Where We Were really begins to sink in its hooks."

In a more mixed review, Molloy Woodcraft of The Observer says that "Individual tracks take their time to get going (only one song here comes in under four minutes) and numbers such as opener 'Small Things' break after two or three minutes to build back up from a pleasant plod to a sustained fug of sound", but comments that "the title track is a winner but it’s with 'In Dreams', and its fast folky picking, that the record really takes off... [and] the near eight-minute 'End of the Affair' aims to give John Martyn’s Rather Be the Devil a run for its money". Rolling Stones' Hilary Hughes comments that "As mild as the music might often sound, this is an album that cuts deep."

Professional ratings
Aggregate scores
Source	Rating
Metacritic	77/100
Review scores
Source	Rating
AllMusic	3.5/5 stars
Clash	7/10
Consequence	C+
Digital Spy	4.5/5 stars
DIY	4/5 stars
Drowned in Sound	7/10
MusicOMH	4.5/5 stars
Q	4/5 stars
The Daily Telegraph	4/5 stars
The Guardian	4/5 stars

=== Accolades ===
Publication	Accolade	Rank
Digital Spy	Top 30 Albums of 2014	15
MusicOMH	Top 100 Albums of 2014	57
Sputnikmusic	Top 100 Albums of the 2010s	63

== Track listing ==
All tracks are written by Ben Howard.

No.	Title	Length
1.	"Small Things"	5:43
2.	"Rivers in Your Mouth"	5:12
3.	"I Forget Where We Were"	4:43
4.	"In Dreams"	3:34
5.	"She Treats Me Well"	5:18
6.	"Time Is Dancing"	6:49
7.	"Evergreen"	4:05
8.	"End of the Affair"	7:46
9.	"Conrad"	6:09
10.	"All Is Now Harmed"	5:03
Total length:		53:04

Vinyl and iTunes extra track
No.	Title	Length
11.	"Am I in Your Light?"	4:49
Total length:		54:44

Deluxe edition bonus disc
No.	Title	Length
1.	"How Are You Feeling?"	4:29
2.	"I Follow Stars"	4:18
3.	"The Burren"	5:25
4.	"Quiet Me Down" (Live)	5:01
5.	"Lotus Flower"	7:09

== Personnel ==
Credits are adapted from the I Forget Where We Were liner notes.

Musicians

- Ben Howard – vocals; acoustic and electric guitars; percussion
- Chris Bond – drums; bass; double bass; synthesizers; electric guitar; piano; keyboards; percussion; backing vocals
- Andrew Bond – organ; piano; synthesizers; backing vocals
- Mickey Smith – bass; electric and twelve-string guitars; backing vocals
- Nat Wason – electric guitar; backing vocals
- India Bourne – cello; backing vocals

Production and artwork

- Chris Bond – producer; engineer
- Andrew Bond – engineer
- Timmy Ayres – engineer
- Mike Crossey – mixing
- Jonathan Gilmore – assistant mix engineer
- Robin Schmidt – mastering
- Owen Tozer – art direction; design
- Roddy Bow – photography

== Charts ==
=== Weekly charts ===
Chart (2014)	Peak position
Australian Albums (ARIA)	9
Austrian Albums (Ö3 Austria)	26
Belgian Albums (Ultratop Flanders)	2
Belgian Albums (Ultratop Wallonia)	24
Danish Albums (Hitlisten)	15
Dutch Albums (Album Top 100)	2
French Albums (SNEP)	68
German Albums (Offizielle Top 100)	12
Irish Albums (IRMA)	5
New Zealand Albums (RMNZ)	6
Norwegian Albums (VG-lista)	21
Portuguese Albums (AFP)	28
Scottish Albums (OCC)	1
Swedish Albums (Sverigetopplistan)	57
Swiss Albums (Schweizer Hitparade)	15
UK Albums (OCC)	1
UK Album Downloads (OCC)	1

=== Year-end charts ===
Chart (2014)	Position
Belgian Albums (Ultratop Flanders)	70
Dutch Albums (Album Top 100)	85
UK Albums (OCC)	59

Chart (2015)	Position
Belgian Albums (Ultratop Flanders)	68

== Certifications ==
Region	Certification	Certified units/sales
United Kingdom (BPI)	Platinum	300,000^{‡}
^{‡} Sales+streaming figures based on certification alone.
