= Nørgaard (song) =

- UK single cover art

Single by the Vaccines

from the album What Did You Expect from The Vaccines?
- Released: 19 August 2011
- Recorded: 2010
- Length: 1:40 (single mix)
- Label: Columbia Records
- Songwriter(s): The Vaccines
- Producer(s): Dan Grech-Marguerat

The Vaccines singles chronology
"All in White" (2011)	"Nørgaard" (2011)	"Wetsuit / Tiger Blood" (2011)

"Nørgaard" is the fifth single from English indie rock band the Vaccines from their debut album, What Did You Expect from The Vaccines?. The single was released on digital download and 7" vinyl in the United Kingdom on 19 August 2011. Prior to its single release the song appeared in the film Diary of a Wimpy Kid: Rodrick Rules on 25 March 2011, two weeks after What Did You Expect from The Vaccines? was released.

== Music video ==
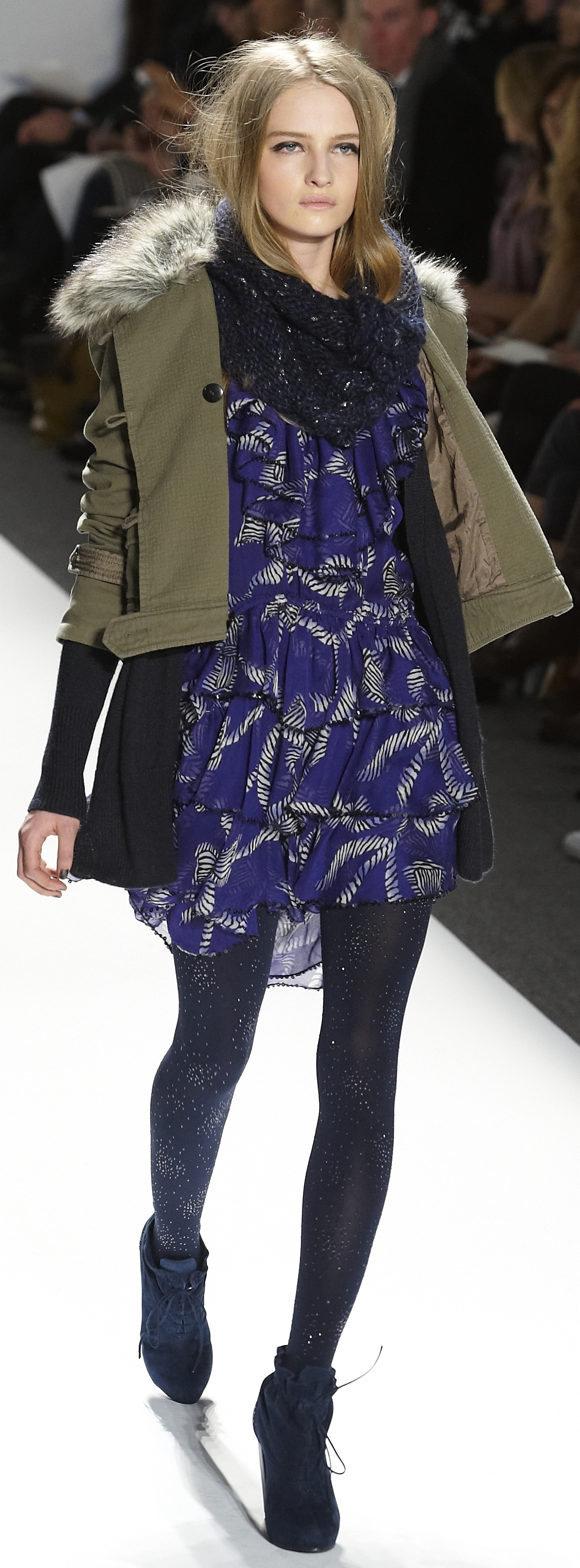
Amanda Nørgaard walking for Rebecca Taylor in 2010

A music video to accompany the release of "Nørgaard" was first released onto YouTube on 6 July 2011; at a total length of one minute and thirty-nine seconds. In the music video, the band is staged in a photoshoot with young Danish model Amanda Nørgaard, about whom the song was written.

== Track listing ==
Digital download
No.	Title	Length
1.	"Nørgaard - Single Mix" (Explicit Version)	1:40
2.	"Primal Urges"	3:04

== Credits and personnel ==
- Lead vocals – The Vaccines
- Producers – Dan Grech-Marguerat
- Lyrics – The Vaccines
- Label: Columbia Records

== Charts ==
Chart (2011)	Peak position
Scotland (OCC)	64
UK Singles (OCC)	84

== Certifications ==
Region	Certification	Certified units/sales
United Kingdom (BPI)	Silver	200,000^{‡}
^{‡} Sales+streaming figures based on certification alone.

== Release history ==
Region	Date	Format
United Kingdom	19 August 2011	Digital Download; 7" vinyl
