= The Wolves (song) =

Single by Ben Howard

Single by Ben Howard

from the album Every Kingdom
- Released: 3 June 2011; 23 February 2012 (re-release)
- Recorded: 2011
- Genre: Folk; indie folk
- Length: 3:18
- Label: Island
- Songwriter: Ben Howard
- Producer: Chris Bond

Ben Howard singles chronology
| "The Wolves" (2011) | "Keep Your Head Up" (2011) |
| "The Fear" (2011) | ""The Wolves (re-release)"" (2012) | "Only Love" (2012) |

Alternative cover
- Re-Release cover art

"The Wolves" is the debut single by the English singer-songwriter Ben Howard, from his first studio album, Every Kingdom. The song was written by Howard and produced by Chris Bond. It is a re-recording of the original version found on the 2009 EP, These Waters. Released in the United Kingdom on 3 June 2011 as a digital download and on CD, the song entered the UK singles chart at number 97 and reached a peak chart position of number 70. The single's cover art was designed by Owen Tozer.

The single was re-released on 23 February 2012 containing one extra version of the song.

The song finds Howard using fairy tale lyrics to lament about human nature.

== Music video ==
A music video to accompany the release of "The Wolves" was released on YouTube on 22 June 2011 with a total length of three minutes and nineteen seconds. The video is also included on the deluxe edition of the studio album Every Kingdom.

== Track listing ==
| No. | Title | Length |
|---|---|---|
| 1. | "The Wolves" | 3:18 |
| 2. | "The Wolves" (Acoustic) | 5:37 |
| Total length: | | 8:55 |

Re-Release
| No. | Title | Length |
|---|---|---|
| 1. | "The Wolves" | 3:18 |
| 2. | "The Wolves" (Little Dragon Mystic Chant Remix) | 3:53 |
| 3. | "The Wolves" (Acoustic) | 5:37 |
| Total length: | | 12:48 |

== Chart performance ==
| Chart (2011) | Peak Position |
|---|---|
| UK Chart | 70 |
| UK Streaming Chart | 47 |
| Belgian Chart (Wallonia) | 27 |

== Certifications ==
| Region | Certification | Certified units/sales |
|---|---|---|
| United Kingdom (BPI) | Gold | 400,000^{‡} |
^{‡} Sales+streaming figures based on certification alone.

== Release History ==
| Country | Release Date | Format | Label |
|---|---|---|---|
| United Kingdom | 3 June 2011; 23 February 2012 (re-release) | Digital Download, CD | Island |
