= Wetsuit / Tiger Blood =

Single by the Vaccines

from the album What Did You Expect from The Vaccines?
- Released: 11 December 2011
- Recorded: 2010
- Genre: Indie rock
- Length: 3:45
- Label: Columbia Records
- Songwriter(s): The Vaccines
- Producer(s): Dan Grech-Marguerat ("Wetsuit"); Albert Hammond Jr. & Gus Oberg ("Tiger Blood")

The Vaccines singles chronology
"Nørgaard" (2011)	"Wetsuit / Tiger Blood" (2011)	"Why Should I Love You?" (2012)

"Wetsuit / Tiger Blood" is a single from English indie rock band the Vaccines from their debut album, What Did You Expect from The Vaccines?. The single was released in the United Kingdom as a digital download on 11 December 2011. It was also released as on 7" vinyl limited to 500 copies. The single debuted at number 164 on the UK Singles Chart.

== Music video ==
A music video to accompany the release of "Wetsuit" was first released onto YouTube on 5 October 2011; at a total length of three minute and fifty-five seconds. This was the world's first Instagram crowdsourced music video.

== Track listing ==
Digital download / 7" vinyl
No.	Title	Length
1.	"Wetsuit" (Single Mix)	3:45
2.	"Tiger Blood" (Explicit Version)	2:01

== Credits and personnel ==
- Performed by – The Vaccines
- Produced by – Dan Grech-Marguerat ("Wetsuit"), Albert Hammond Jr. & Gus Oberg ("Tiger Blood")
- Engineered by – Gus Oberg ("Tiger Blood")
- Lyrics – Justin Hayward-Young
- Music – The Vaccines
- Label – Columbia Records

== Chart performance ==
Chart (2011)	Peak position
Belgium (Ultratop 50 Flanders)	50
UK Singles (Official Charts Company)	164

== Certifications ==
Certifications for "Wetsuit"
Region	Certification	Certified units/sales
United Kingdom (BPI)	Silver	200,000^{‡}
^{‡} Sales+streaming figures based on certification alone.

== Release history ==
Region	Date	Format
United Kingdom	11 December 2011	Digital Download
