= Post Break-Up Sex =

2011 single by the Vaccines

Single by the Vaccines

from the album What Did You Expect from The Vaccines?
- Released: 21 January 2011
- Recorded: 2010
- Genre: Indie rock, guitar pop, dream pop
- Length: 2:56
- Label: Columbia Records
- Songwriter: The Vaccines
- Producer: Dan Grech-Marguerat

The Vaccines singles chronology
"Wreckin' Bar (Ra Ra Ra) / Blow It Up" (2010)	"Post Break-Up Sex" (2011)	"If You Wanna" (2011)

"Post Break-Up Sex" is the second single from London-based quartet the Vaccines from their debut album, What Did You Expect from The Vaccines?. The single was released in the United Kingdom as a digital download on 21 January 2011 with a 7" vinyl released the following day. The single debuted at number 32 on the UK Singles Chart on 30 January 2011.

== Track listing ==
Digital download
No.	Title	Length
1.	"Post Break-Up Sex"	2:56
2.	"We're Happening"	2:42

== Music video ==
A music video to accompany the release of "Post Break-Up Sex" was first released onto YouTube on 15 December 2010; at a total length of two minutes and fifty-six seconds. The video features the quartet performing the song in a living room, although Young is predominantly featured throughout. The video then alternates between shots of the performance and clips of the woman, as mentioned in the song's lyrics, who is regretting the post break-up sex she had with a male; who is featured besides her in the video. For the final minute of the music video, a montage of upset adults are shown; symbolising all those who have either had post break-up sex or have been at the mercy of it.

== Critical reception ==
Jon Davies of Shazamers' Blog gave the song a positive review stating:

Predictably the track is inspired by those, quite often awkward, moments when you’re trying to put a relationship behind you. Thankfully, despite the morose subject matter, the song continues the band’s string of addictive singles. Short, punchy and with a chorus that will refuse to leave your head for weeks, ‘Post Break Up Sex’ is a great slice of fuzzy guitar driven pop.

== Record Store Day ==
It was announced in March 2012 that the band would be re-releasing "Post Break-Up Sex" as a 7" Vinyl as part of Record Store Day 2012. On April 2, it was revealed that the track would be recorded by American singer-songwriter R. Stevie Moore and released as a double A-side alongside the group's recording of Moore's "Why Should I Love You?". The vinyl was limited to 500 copies, which saw release on 21 April 2012.

== Chart performance ==
According to the Midweeks produced by Digital Spy on 25 January 2011, "Post Break-Up Sex" was set to debut within the top 20 on the UK Singles Chart. However, on 30 January, it debuted at number 32. The single spent only one week within the top 40, falling 23 places to number 53 on its second week. On 13 February, the single fell a further 13 places to number 66; marking its third and final week on the top 100.

== Charts ==
Chart (2011)	Peak position
Belgium (Ultratip Bubbling Under Flanders)	29
Belgium (Ultratip Bubbling Under Wallonia)	27
Scotland Singles (Official Charts)	30
UK Singles (Official Charts)	32

== Certifications ==
Region	Certification	Certified units/sales
United Kingdom (BPI)	Silver	200,000^{‡}
^{‡} Sales+streaming figures based on certification alone.

== Release history ==
Region	Date	Format
United Kingdom	21 January 2011	Digital Download
United Kingdom	24 January 2011	Vinyl
United Kingdom	21 April 2012	Record Store Day Vinyl
