= The Fear (Ben Howard song) =

Single by Ben Howard

from the album Every Kingdom
- Released: 5 December 2011
- Recorded: 2011
- Genre: Folk, indie folk
- Length: 4:20
- Label: Island
- Songwriter(s): Ben Howard
- Producer(s): Chris Bond, Jason Howes

Ben Howard singles chronology
| "Keep Your Head Up" (2011) | "The Fear" (2011) | "The Wolves" (2012) |

"The Fear" is a song by British singer-songwriter Ben Howard from his debut studio album Every Kingdom. It was released as a single in the United Kingdom on 5 December 2011 as a digital download and on CD. The song was written by Ben Howard and produced by Chris Bond and Jason Howes. The cover art was designed by Owen Tozer.

In December 2012, the single was certified gold by the Belgian Entertainment Association.

== Music video ==
A music video to accompany the release of "The Fear" was released on YouTube on 22 June 2011 with a total length of four minutes and thirty-five seconds.

== Track listing ==
| No. | Title | Length |
|---|---|---|
| 1. | "The Fear" | 4:20 |
| Total length: | | 4:20 |

== Charts ==
=== Weekly charts ===
| Chart (2011–2012) | Peak position |
|---|---|
| Belgium (Ultratop 50 Flanders) | 5 |
| Belgium (Ultratip Bubbling Under Wallonia) | 2 |
| UK Singles (OCC) | 58 |

=== Year-end charts ===
| Chart (2012) | Position |
|---|---|
| Belgium (Ultratop Flanders) | 29 |

== Certifications ==
| Region | Certification | Certified units/sales |
|---|---|---|
| Belgium (BRMA) | Gold | 15,000^{*} |
| United Kingdom (BPI) | Silver | 200,000^{‡} |
^{*} Sales figures based on certification alone.^{‡} Sales+streaming figures based on certification alone.

== Release history ==
| Country | Release date | Format | Label |
|---|---|---|---|
| United Kingdom | 5 December 2011 | Digital download, CD | Island |
