= Old Pine (EP) =

EP by Ben Howard
- Released: 2 April 2011
- Recorded: 2010
- Genres: Folk; indie
- Length: 17:15
- Label: Communion
- Producer: Chris Bond

Ben Howard chronology
These Waters EP (2009)	Old Pine (2011)	Every Kingdom (2011)

Old Pine is an EP by the English singer-songwriter Ben Howard. It was released on 2 April 2011 as a digital download, on CD and LP. The songs on the EP were written by Howard and produced by Chris Bond. The cover art was designed by Owen Tozer, based on photography by Roddy Bow. A promotional single was released for the EP with the same cover art, but with a different colour disc and containing only the song "Old Pine".

== Music video ==
A music video for "Old Pine" was released on YouTube on 7 April 2011 to accompany the release of the Old Pine EP with a total length of five minutes and twenty-seven seconds. The video is also included on the deluxe edition of the studio album Every Kingdom.

== Track listing ==
No.	Title	Length
1.	"Old Pine"	4:20
2.	"Further Away"	4:28
3.	"Follaton Wood"	4:51
4.	"Three Tree Town"	3:36
Total length:		17:15

The music video version of the song "Old Pine" is included on the studio album Every Kingdom, which was released on 30 September 2011. The song "Three Tree Town" is a re-recording of a free download, which was self-released in 2009 and is no longer available for download.

== Release history ==
Country	Release date	Format	Label
United Kingdom	2 April 2011	Digital download, CD, LP	Communion
