= Every Kingdom =

Studio album by Ben Howard
- Released: 30 September 2011
- Recorded: 2011
- Studio: The Barn (Devon); Battery Studios (London)
- Genre: Folk; indie folk
- Length: 50:05
- Label: Island
- Producer: Chris Bond

Ben Howard chronology
Old Pine (2011)	Every Kingdom (2011)	The Burgh Island E.P. (2012)

Singles from Every Kingdom
- 1. "The Wolves" Released: 3 June 2011; 2. "Keep Your Head Up" Released: 26 August 2011; 3. "The Fear" Released: 12 October 2011; 4. "Only Love" Released: 4 May 2012; 5. "Old Pine" Released: 20 July 2012

Alternative cover
- Physical deluxe edition cover

Every Kingdom is the debut studio album by the English singer-songwriter Ben Howard. It was released in the United Kingdom on 30 September 2011 as a digital download, CD, LP, and 200-copy limited edition cassette by Island Records. It reached a peak chart position of number four in the UK Albums Chart on 24 February 2013 following his success at the Brit Awards that week. The songs on the album were written by Ben Howard and produced by Chris Bond. The cover art was designed by Owen Tozer, based on photography by Mickey Smith and Roddy Bow.

The song "Old Pine" is the music video version of the original found on the extended play (EP) Old Pine (2011). A remix of the song by the art rock band Everything Everything was released by Howard as a single on 20 July 2012. The songs "The Wolves" and "These Waters" are re-recordings of the original versions found on the EP These Waters (2009). The song "Keep Your Head Up" is a re-recording of the original version found on the EP Games in the Dark (2009). The song "Black Flies" was released on 21 April 2012 as a 100-copy limited edition LP as part of the 2012 edition of Secret 7", each copy with different cover art.

The song "Black Flies" was featured in the 2017 Square Enix and Deck Nine episodic adventure game Life Is Strange: Before the Storm's fourth, bonus episode as the ending song of the episode.

The album was nominated for the 2012 Mercury Prize.

Professional ratings
Aggregate scores
Source	Rating
Metacritic	71/100
Review scores
Source	Rating
AllMusic	3.5/5 stars
Consequence	C+
The Guardian	3/5 stars
PopMatters	8/10
DIY	8/10

== Singles ==
- "The Wolves" is the first single from the album. It was released in the United Kingdom on 3 June 2011 and re-released on 23 February 2012. It reached a peak chart position of 70 on the UK Singles Chart.
- "Keep Your Head Up" is the second single from the album. It was released in the United Kingdom on 26 August 2011. It reached a peak chart position of 46 on the UK Singles Chart.
- "The Fear" is the third single from the album. It was released in the United Kingdom on 12 October 2011. It reached a peak chart position of 58 on the UK Singles Chart.
- "Only Love" is the fourth single from the album. It was released in the United Kingdom on 4 May 2012. It reached a peak chart position of 9 on the UK Singles Chart.
- "Old Pine" is the fifth single from the album. It was released in the United Kingdom on 20 July 2012.

== Track listing ==
All tracks are written by Ben Howard.

No.	Title	Length
1.	"Old Pine"	5:27
2.	"Diamonds"	4:07
3.	"The Wolves"	5:09
4.	"Everything"	4:46
5.	"Only Love"	4:09
6.	"The Fear"	4:20
7.	"Keep Your Head Up"	4:22
8.	"Black Flies"	6:22
9.	"Gracious"	4:57
10.	"Promise"	6:24
Total length:		50:05

iTunes bonus track
No.	Title	Length
11.	"7 Bottles"	4:39
Total length:		54:44

Deluxe edition bonus disc
No.	Title	Length
1.	"These Waters"	4:08
2.	"Empty Corridors" (Live)	5:26
3.	"Under the Same Sun"	4:46
4.	"Bones"	5:46
5.	"I Will Be Blessed"	5:31
6.	"Move like You Want" (Live)	8:21
Total length:		33:58

Deluxe edition bonus DVD
No.	Title	Length
1.	"Old Pine" (Music Video)	5:27
2.	"The Wolves" (Music Video)	3:20
3.	"Keep Your Head Up" (Music Video)	3:58
4.	"The Wolves" (Woodland Sessions)	4:29
5.	"Old Pine" (Woodland Sessions)	4:18
6.	"Everything" (Woodland Sessions)	5:23
7.	"Highland Drifting" (Behind the Scenes)	6:48
8.	"Making of a Record Cover" (Behind the Scenes)	4:13
9.	"The Barn" (Behind the Scenes)	5:55
Total length:		43:52

== Personnel ==
Credits are adapted from the Every Kingdom liner notes.

Musicians

- Ben Howard – vocals; guitar; additional guitars; melodica; percussion
- Chris Bond – backing vocals; guitars; bass; double bass; drums; percussion; keyboards; accordion
- India Bourne – backing vocals; cello; keyboards; ukulele; bass

Production and artwork

- Chris Bond – producer; engineer
- Darren Lawson – engineer
- Jason Howes – engineer
- Cenzo Townshend – mixing
- Mike Crossey – mixing
- Jonathan Gilmore – assistant mix engineer
- Robin Schmidt – mastering
- Owen Tozer – art direction; design
- Mickey Smith – cover photograph
- Owen Tozer – live photograph
- Roddy Bow – all other photography

== Charts ==
=== Weekly charts ===
Chart (2011–13)	Peak position
Australian Albums (ARIA)	63
Belgian Albums (Ultratop Flanders)	2
Belgian Albums (Ultratop Wallonia)	55
Dutch Albums (Album Top 100)	2
French Albums (SNEP)	52
German Albums (Offizielle Top 100)	49
Irish Albums (IRMA)	14
Scottish Albums (OCC)	5
Swiss Albums (Schweizer Hitparade)	59
UK Albums (OCC)	4
UK Album Downloads (OCC)	2

=== Year-end charts ===
Chart (2011)	Position
UK Albums (OCC)	182

Chart (2012)	Position
Belgian Albums (Ultratop Flanders)	24
Dutch Albums (Album Top 100)	17
UK Albums (OCC)	28

Chart (2013)	Position
Belgian Albums (Ultratop Flanders)	68
Dutch Albums (Album Top 100)	38
UK Albums (OCC)	38

Chart (2014)	Position
UK Albums (OCC)	98

Chart (2022)	Position
Belgian Albums (Ultratop Flanders)	200

Chart (2024)	Position
Belgian Albums (Ultratop Flanders)	153

=== Decade-end charts ===
Chart (2010–2019)	Position
UK Albums (OCC)	76

== Certifications ==
Region	Certification	Certified units/sales
Australia (ARIA)	Gold	35,000^{‡}
Canada (Music Canada)	Gold	40,000^{^}
Denmark (IFPI Danmark)	Platinum	20,000^{‡}
Germany (BVMI)	Gold	100,000^{‡}
Netherlands (NVPI)	Platinum	50,000^{^}
New Zealand (RMNZ)	Platinum	15,000^{‡}
Sweden (GLF)	Gold	20,000^{‡}
United Kingdom (BPI)	3× Platinum	900,000^{‡}
United States (RIAA)	Gold	500,000^{‡}
^{^} Shipments figures based on certification alone.^{‡} Sales+streaming figures based on certification alone.

== Release history ==
Country	Release date	Format	Label
United Kingdom	30 September 2011	Digital download, CD, LP, cassette	Island
United States	6 November 2012	Digital download, CD	Communion
