= Old Pine (song) =

Single by Ben Howard

from the album Every Kingdom
- Released: 20 July 2012
- Recorded: 2011
- Genre: Folk; indie folk
- Length: 4:14
- Label: Island
- Songwriter: Ben Howard
- Producer: Chris Bond

Ben Howard singles chronology
"Only Love" (2012)	"Old Pine" (2012)	"I Forget Where We Were" (2014)

"Old Pine" is a song by the English singer-songwriter Ben Howard from his debut studio album Every Kingdom. The song was written by Howard and produced by Chris Bond. It is the music video version of the original found on Howard's Old Pine EP.

A remix of the song by Everything Everything was released by Howard as a single in the United Kingdom on 20 July 2012 as a digital download with cover art designed by Owen Tozer. It features in the Sky1 TV series Starlings.

== Music video ==
The music video for "Old Pine" was filmed in Co. Clare, Ireland. It was released on YouTube on 7 April 2011, to accompany the release of Old Pine EP, at a total length of five minutes and twenty-seven seconds. The video is also included on the deluxe edition of the studio album Every Kingdom.

== Track listing ==
No.	Title	Length
1.	"Old Pine" (Everything Everything Remix)	4:14
Total length:		4:14

== Certifications ==
Region	Certification	Certified units/sales
Australia (ARIA)	Platinum	70,000^{‡}
Denmark (IFPI Danmark)	Gold	45,000^{‡}
New Zealand (RMNZ)	Platinum	30,000^{‡}
United Kingdom (BPI)	Platinum	600,000^{‡}
^{‡} Sales+streaming figures based on certification alone.

== Release history ==
Country	Release date	Format	Label
United Kingdom	20 July 2012	Digital Download	Island
