= If You Wanna =

2011 single by the Vaccines

Single by the Vaccines

from the album What Did You Expect from The Vaccines?
- Released: 18 March 2011
- Recorded: 2010
- Genre: Post-punk revival, power pop, indie rock, surf punk
- Length: 3:02
- Label: Columbia Records
- Songwriter: The Vaccines
- Producer: Dan Grech-Marguerat

The Vaccines singles chronology
"Post Break-Up Sex" (2011)	"If You Wanna" (2011)	"All in White" (2011)

Alternative cover

"If You Wanna" is the third single by English indie rock band the Vaccines, from their debut album What Did You Expect from The Vaccines? The single was released in the United Kingdom on 18 March 2011. The single debuted at number fifty-three on the UK Singles Chart upon release in March 2011, peaking at number thirty-five in April 2012.

== Music video ==
A music video to accompany the release of "If You Wanna" was first released onto YouTube on 23 February 2011; at a total length of two minutes and fifty-five seconds. The music video has accumulated over 10 million views, their highest viewed video on the website to date.

== Track listing ==
Digital download No. 1
No.	Title	Length
1.	"If You Wanna"	2:54
2.	"Out of the Way"	2:44

Digital download No. 2
No.	Title	Length
1.	"If You Wanna"	2:54
2.	"It's All Good"	2:46

EP
No.	Title	Length
1.	"If You Wanna"	2:54
2.	"It's All Good"	2:46
3.	"Out of the Way"	2:44
4.	"Good Guys Don't Wear White"	2:20

== Personnel ==
- Lead vocals – The Vaccines
- Producers – Dan Grech-Marguerat
- Lyrics – The Vaccines
- Label: Columbia Records

== Charts ==
Chart (2011)	Peak position
UK Singles (OCC)	53
Japan (Billboard Hot 100)	40
Chart (2012)	Peak position
UK Singles (OCC)	35
Chart (2014)	Peak position
Spain (Promusicae)	9

== Release history ==
Region	Date	Format
United Kingdom	18 March 2011	Digital download

== Certifications ==
Region	Certification	Certified units/sales
United Kingdom (BPI)	Platinum	600,000^{‡}
^{‡} Sales+streaming figures based on certification alone.

== In media ==
It is included on the soundtrack for the video game Major League Baseball 2K12. In 2012 it was used in the adverts for Series 3 of Made in Chelsea and in June of that year, it was used in adverts for Rimmel London. Spanish beer Estrella Damm, Catalonia's largest beer brewer, used the song in their Summer of 2014 TV campaign, making this song achieve success in the Spanish music charts, peaking at number 9 position in the PROMUSICAE Top 50 Songs.
