= Ben Howard =

English singer-songwriter (born 1987)

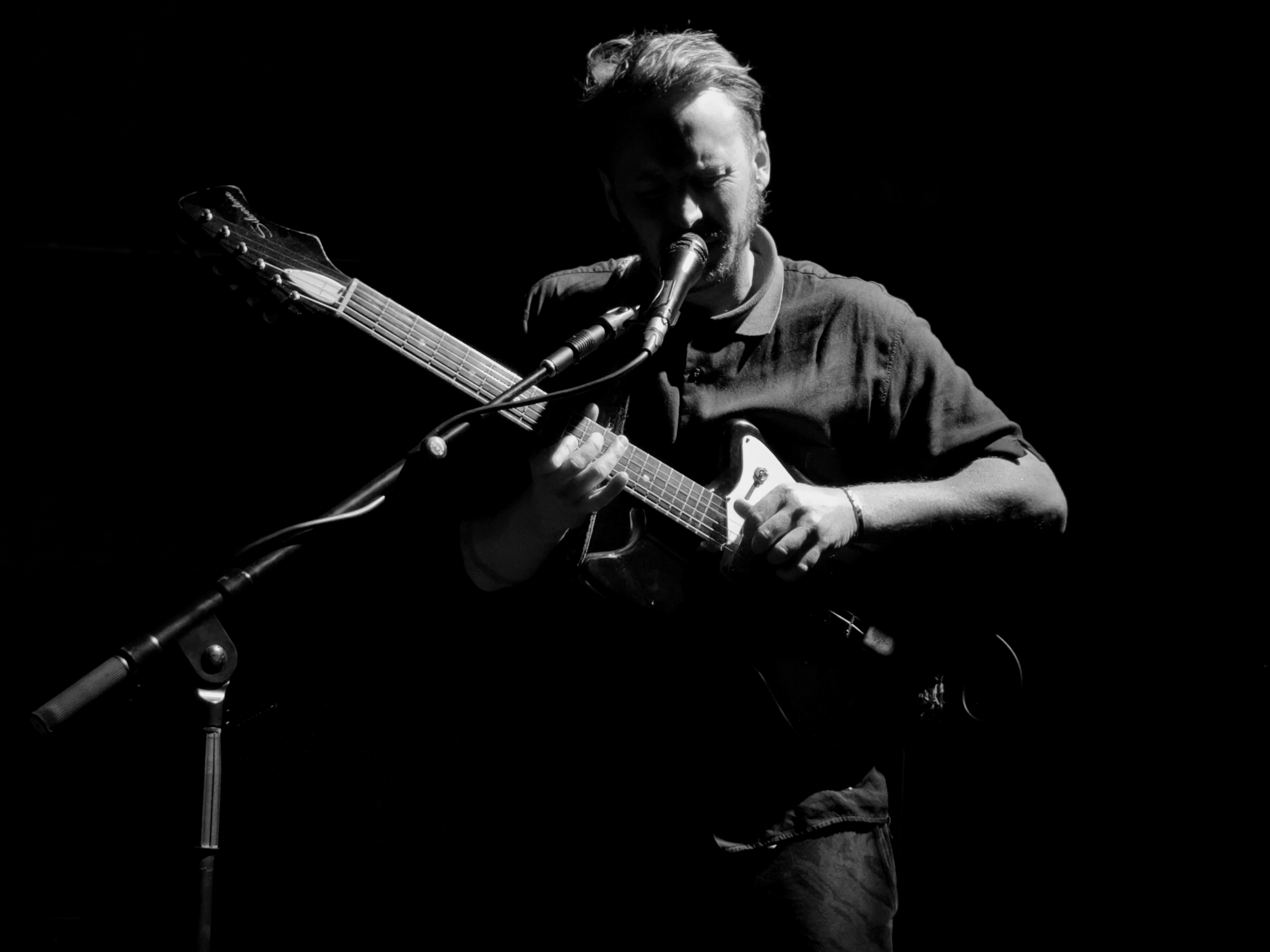
- Howard performing in 2021

Background information
- Born: Benjamin John Howard; 24 April 1987 (age 39); Richmond, London, England
- Origin: Bantham, Devon, England
- Genres: Folk; indie folk; folktronica; ambient; experimental rock; alternative rock; rock
- Occupations: Singer-songwriter; musician; composer
- Instruments: Vocals; guitar; percussion
- Works: Ben Howard discography
- Years active: 2009–present
- Labels: Island (UK); Communion (UK); Tôt ou Tard (France); Republic (US)
- Member of: A Blaze of Feather
- Website: benhowardmusic.co.uk

Benjamin John Howard (born 24 April 1987) is an English singer-songwriter, musician and composer. His self-released debut extended play (EP) Games in the Dark (2008) was followed by two more EPs, These Waters (2009) and Old Pine (2010). Signed to Island Records, his debut studio album came in 2011 titled Every Kingdom. The album reached number four on the UK Albums Chart and was certified triple platinum by the British Phonographic Industry (BPI). Howard later released two more EPs, Ben Howard Live (2011) and The Burgh Island E.P. (2012).

At the Brit Awards 2013 ceremony he received two awards: British Male Solo Artist, and British Breakthrough Act. He performed at the 2013 Glastonbury Festival on the Pyramid Stage on Saturday 29 June. He released his second studio album, I Forget Where We Were, in October 2014, peaking at number one on the UK Albums Chart.

As of 2017, he was a member of the band A Blaze of Feather with India Bourne, Mickey Smith, Nat Wason, Rich Thomas and Kyle Keegan.

Howard's third studio album, Noonday Dream, was released in June 2018. It debuted at number four on the UK Albums Chart, and received favorable reviews from music critics. His fourth studio album, Collections from the Whiteout, was released in March 2021. He released his fifth studio album Is It? in June 2023.

== Early life ==
Benjamin John Howard was born on 24 April 1987 in Richmond, south-west London, England, and moved near Totnes, Devon when he was about eight. He was raised by musical parents, who exposed him to their favourite records from singer-songwriter artists from the 1960s and 1970s at an early age, such as John Martyn, Van Morrison, Joni Mitchell and Simon & Garfunkel, by whom he was strongly influenced.

Howard began writing songs when he was eleven. In an interview with American Songwriter, he stated that when he was a kid he started playing guitar because he liked to put words together and make stuff up. "I was quite an imaginative little kid I guess. So your standard little love songs turned into your standard adolescent love songs. I think you start getting your own take on things when you're a late teen. That's when everything changes." Besides playing the guitar, Howard also played other instruments as a kid. He easily picked up the drums and contrabass, but after some time he decided to focus on the guitar. After attending King Edward VI Community College and Torquay Boys' Grammar School he began studying journalism at Falmouth College of Arts. Six months prior to completion of his course, Howard decided to focus on making music full-time, making melodic rootsy folk music, with progressively darker lyrics. His reputation grew around Devon, and soon spread to other areas of the UK. After a month of sold-out dates across Europe and the UK, Howard was eventually asked to sign a recording contract with Island Records.

Due to his association with the town, Howard was chosen in 2014 to appear on the 10 Totnes pound note.

== Music career ==
=== 2008–2011: Early releases ===
Before signing to a record label, Howard had already released some material. In 2008, he self-released his debut EP Games in the Dark. His first major release was These Waters, an EP featuring six tracks, including "The Wolves". In 2010, Howard released the Old Pine EP, followed by a number of singles, such as "The Fear" and "Keep Your Head Up". Howard now had enough material to release a studio album, Every Kingdom, which would feature a number of his previous singles. One of the songs from this album, "Promise" was used in the first episode of the American television series The 100. In 2010, he also supported the Australian folk and indie pop group Angus & Julia Stone during their concerts in Europe. He also joined them for one live performance of "Yellow Brick Road" in Paris, France.

=== 2011–2013: Every Kingdom ===
Howard signed a recording contract with Island Records in 2011, due to the label's history of English folk singers, including Nick Drake and John Martyn. After singles "Old Pine" and "The Wolves" were released in 2011, Howard recorded his debut studio album entitled Every Kingdom, which was released on 30 September 2011. He was nominated for the 2012 Mercury Prize.

Howard worked alongside India Bourne, Marcus Wright and Chris Bond to make Every Kingdom, with Bourne playing cello, keyboards, ukulele, bass and contributing backing vocals and percussion, Bond playing guitars, bass, double bass, drums, percussion, keyboards, accordion, contributing to the backing vocals, and also producing the record, and additional modular-dynamic (MD) synthesisers provided by Wright. He also toured with Bourne and Bond on his 2012 Every Kingdom tour, with support from the American singer-songwriter Willy Mason.

In 2012, Howard launched his music in America with Every Kingdom being released on 3 April 2012, and appearances at South by Southwest (SXSW) in Texas and a US tour confirmed. His song "Promise" was featured at the end of season 8, episode 12 of the American television series House.

In May 2012, Howard performed "The Wolves" on Later... with Jools Holland. He played at Pinkpop Festival in the Netherlands on 26 May and BBC Radio 1's Big Weekend in Hackney, London on 24 June 2012. He also played at the 2012 Bonnaroo Music Festival in Manchester, Tennessee, the 2012 T in the Park music festival in Scotland, as well as Beach Break Live 2012 in South Wales, Bestival 2012 and Splendour in the Grass 2012. Howard also played a slot at the Austin City Limits Music Festival in October 2012.

In November 2012, Howard released The Burgh Island EP produced by Chris Bond, which featured four new tracks. Once again released to critical acclaim, the EP had a darker, more menacing tone than most of Howard's previous work, with Howard also playing electric guitar, rather than his traditional acoustic. The second track from the EP, "Oats in the Water", was featured in "Internment", the 5th episode in Season 4 of AMC's The Walking Dead, in the 1st episode in season 3 of Fox's The Following, and in the release trailer for The Witcher 3: Wild Hunt. In 2014, the song "Promise" from the album Every Kingdom featured in the USA Network drama, Suits Season 3 Episode 11, "Buried Secrets" along with The CW drama Reign Season 1 Episode 10, "Sacrifice".

In 2013, Howard began collaborating with the musician and filmmaker Mickey Smith, who would become a mainstay co-writer and performer on all of Howard's subsequent studio albums. Smith joined Howard's band for their performance on the main Pyramid Stage at Glastonbury Festival 2013, on Saturday 29 June 2013, which saw them play six tracks from Every Kingdom.

=== 2014–2015: I Forget Where We Were ===
In 2014, Howard headlined the inaugural Somersault Festival, based in North Devon, with other artists such as Jack Johnson.

On 5 August 2014, Howard's first single "End of the Affair" from his second studio album was played on Zane Lowe's BBC Radio 1 and Danielle Perry's Xfm shows. On 18 August 2014, Howard announced the title of his second studio album, I Forget Where We Were on Zane Lowe's show on BBC Radio 1 whilst releasing the title track from the record at the same time. On 26 October, I Forget Where We Were became number 26 in the UK Albums Chart. The album went on to peak at number-one on the UK Albums Chart, and the Scottish Albums Chart. It also peaked at number two in Belgium, and the Netherlands, and the top ten in Ireland, New Zealand, and Australia.

On 6 April 2015, Howard announced a short string of tour dates in the US with the English indie folk band Daughter as support. These dates were announced following a string of successful shows in Canada and the US. Howard also played on the Other Stage during Glastonbury Festival 2015.

=== 2018-2020: Noonday Dream ===
On 4 April 2018, it was announced that Howard's third studio album, titled Noonday Dream, would be released on 1 June 2018. A new single was also released, titled "A Boat to an Island on the Wall". The single debuted on Annie Mac's Radio 1 station with accompanying 2018 UK tour dates announced. A track listing for the upcoming album was released on his website, along with 2 bonus vinyl-only tracks "Bird on a Wing" and "Interlude".

Together with his band Howard performed two songs from the album, "Nica Libres at Dusk" and "Towing the Line", on Later... with Jools Holland on 15 May 2018.

On 13 September 2018, Howard released Another Friday Night / Hot Heavy Summer / Sister an EP of three different singles, with "Heavy Summer" featuring the American electropop duo Sylvan Esso. Shortly after, he went on to release another single "Heave Ho" in January 2019.

=== 2021-present: Collections from the Whiteout and Is It? ===
On 26 January 2021, Howard announced that his fourth studio album, Collections from the Whiteout, would be released on 26 March 2021. Alongside the announcement, Howard released the single "What a Day". The album was produced by the National and Big Red Machine member Aaron Dessner, recorded over an 18-month period, mostly at Dessner's New York studio Long Pond with additional production in Paris. In promotion of the album, Howard and his band performed it in full at Goonhilly Satellite Earth Station for a show that was live-streamed globally on 8 April 2021.

On 20 April 2023, Howard announced the release date for his fifth studio album, Is It?, as 16 June 2023. The announcement was accompanied by the single "Couldn't Make It Up". Howard recorded the album over a 10-day period, alongside songwriter and record producer Nathan Jenkins, at Le Manoir de Léon studios. It explores his experience following two TIAs in March 2022. In support of the record, he embarked upon a 23 date UK and European tour from May to July 2023.

On 9 January 2024, Howard shared "Rumble Strip", a standalone collaboration with Aaron Dessner which previously had only been available on the vinyl deluxe version of Collections from the Whiteout. On 24 May, Howard announced a UK and Ireland tour for October, commemorating the 10th anniversary of I Forget Where We Were.

In September 2023, Howard became an initial signatory of the No Music for Genocide group which protests against the Gaza genocide by blocking artists' music from being streamed in Israel.

== Personal life ==
Howard has been in a relationship with fashion entrepreneur Agatha Lintott since 2014 and they got married in May 2025. He is an avid surfer and a supporter of Liverpool F.C.

In 2022, Howard suffered two transient ischemic attacks (TIAs), which affected his memory and speech. The experience influenced his fifth studio album Is It? (2023) and led him to quit smoking.

Howard owns a home in Ibiza, where he spent parts of his childhood.

== Guitar style ==
Howard plays guitar left-handed and sometimes plays right-handed guitars upside down ("What the Moon Does"). He makes extensive use of alternate tunings such as CGCGGC ("Old Pine", "Everything", "The Wolves"), DADGAD ("In Dreams", "There's Your Man") and CGA#GFC ("End of the Affair", "Esmerelda"). He also complements these tunings by using a partial capo for many songs ("Further Away", "Everything", "End of the Affair", "Boat to an Island on the Wall") in order to use harmonic or bass notes otherwise unavailable.

He also has a distinctive percussive strumming style, called the "pick and go", and Howard's method of laying the guitar flat on top of his knees and playing it percussively was influenced by contemporary folk songwriter and guitarist John Smith.

== Discography ==
Studio albums

- Every Kingdom (2011)
- I Forget Where We Were (2014)
- Noonday Dream (2018)
- Collections from the Whiteout (2021)
- Is It? (2023)

== Awards and nominations ==
=== BRIT Awards ===
Howard has won both BRIT Awards for which he has been nominated.

Year	Recipient	Nomination	Result
2013	Himself	British Breakthrough Act	Won
2013	Himself	British Solo Male Artist	Won

=== Mercury Prize ===
Howard has been nominated once for the Mercury Prize.

Year	Recipient	Nomination	Result
2012	Every Kingdom	Album of the Year	Nominated

=== Ivor Novello Awards ===
Howard has been nominated three times for the Ivor Novello Awards.

Year	Recipient	Nomination	Result
2013	Every Kingdom	Album of the Year	Nominated
2015	I Forget Where We Were	Best Song Musically and Lyrically	Nominated
2019	Nica Libres at Dusk	Best Song Musically and Lyrically	Won
