= The Vaccines discography =

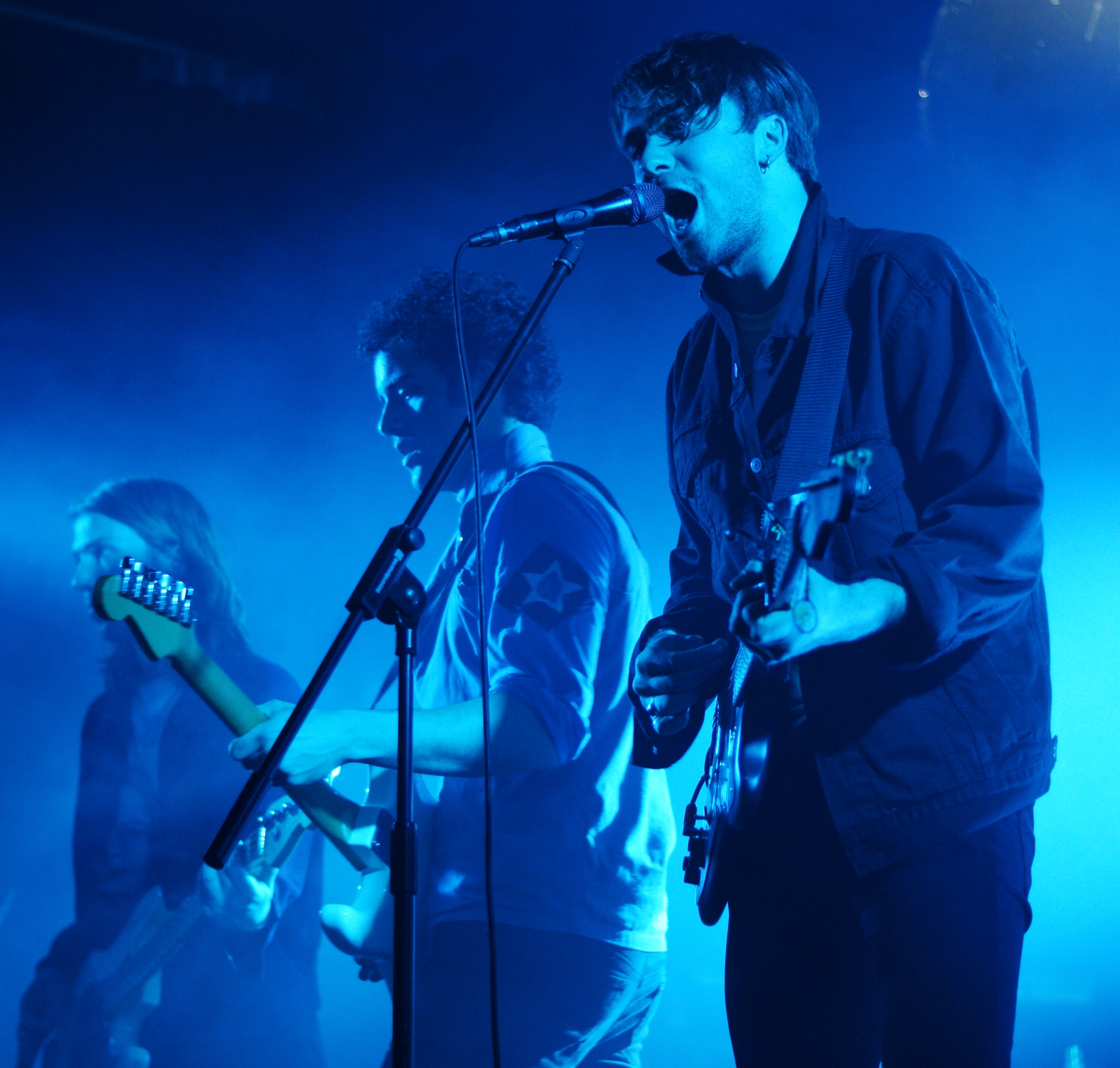
- Studio albums: 6
- Live albums: 1
- Singles: 26
- Music videos: 19

English indie rock band the Vaccines have released six studio albums, one live album, sixteen B-sides, and twenty-six singles.

== Albums ==
=== Studio albums ===
Album	Details	Peak chart positions										Sales	Certifications
Album	Details	UK	AUS	AUT	BEL	FRA	IRE	NLD	SWE	SWI	US	Sales	Certifications
What Did You Expect from The Vaccines?	Released: 14 March 2011; Label: Columbia; Formats: CD, digital download, vinyl	4	—	50	29	124	16	35	40	36	197	UK: 498,708 (as of January 2024)	BPI: Platinum
Come of Age	Released: 3 September 2012; Label: Columbia; Formats: CD, digital download, vinyl	1	43	72	14	60	8	70	36	42	— (Note: Come of Age did not enter the US Billboard 200, but peaked at number 12 on the US Heatseekers Albums Chart.)		BPI: Platinum
English Graffiti	Released: 25 May 2015; Label: Columbia; Formats: CD, digital download, vinyl	2	48	—	62	170	35	82	—	90	— (Note: English Graffiti did not enter the US Billboard 200, but peaked at number four on the US Heatseekers Albums Chart.)		BPI: Gold
Combat Sports	Released: 30 March 2018; Label: Columbia; Formats: CD, digital download, vinyl, cassette	4	—	—	44	—	74	137	—	82	— (Note: Combat Sports did not enter the US Billboard 200, but peaked at number 11 on the US Heatseekers Albums Chart.)		
Back in Love City	Released: 10 September 2021; Label: AWAL; Formats: CD, digital download, vinyl	5	—	—	173	—	—	—	—	—	—		
Pick-Up Full of Pink Carnations	Released: 12 January 2024; Label: Super Easy; Formats: CD, digital download, vinyl	3	—	—	76	—	—	—	—	94	—		
"—" denotes a title that did not chart, or was not released in that territory.

=== Compilations ===
- The Hits (2021)

=== Live albums ===
- Live from London, England (2011)

=== Extended plays ===
- Live from Brighton, England (2012)
- Please, Please Do Not Disturb (2012)
- NME Presents The Vaccines, Home is Where the Start Is, Home Demos 2009–2012 (2013)
- Melody Calling (2013)
- Total Power Pop (2018)
- Cosy Karaoke Vol.1 (2021)
- Planet of the Youth (2022)

=== Splits ===
- Why Should I Love You? / Post Break Up Sex w/ R Stevie Moore (2012)

== Singles ==
Single	Year	Peak chart positions						Certifications	Album
Single	Year	UK	BEL (FL)	BEL (WA)	JPN	MEX Air.	SPA	Certifications	Album
"Wreckin' Bar (Ra Ra Ra)" / "Blow It Up"	2010	157	—	—	—	—	—		What Did You; Expect from The Vaccines?
"Post Break-Up Sex"	2011	32	79	77	—	37	—	BPI: Silver	What Did You; Expect from The Vaccines?
"If You Wanna"	2011	35	—	—	40	—	9	BPI: Platinum	What Did You; Expect from The Vaccines?
"All in White"	2011	—	90	—	—	24	—		What Did You; Expect from The Vaccines?
"Nørgaard"	2011	84	—	—	—	20	—	BPI: Silver	What Did You; Expect from The Vaccines?
"Wetsuit" / "Tiger Blood"	2011	164	50	—	—	—	—	BPI: Silver	What Did You; Expect from The Vaccines?
"Why Should I Love You?" (Note: "Why Should I Love You?" was released as a double A-side with R. Stevie Moore's cover of "Post Break-Up Sex" as part of Record Store Day.)	2012	—	—	—	—	—	—		Non-album single
"No Hope"	2012	37	124	—	—	—	—		Come of Age
"Teenage Icon"	2012	39	64	—	—	11	—		Come of Age
"I Always Knew"	2012	169	67	—	—	—	—		Come of Age
"Bad Mood"	2013	101	101	—	—	—	—		Come of Age
"Melody Calling"	2013	44	71	—	—	—	—		Melody Calling EP
"Handsome"	2015	74	111	—	—	39	—		English Graffiti
"Dream Lover"	2015	155	117	—	—	—	—		English Graffiti
"20/20"	2015	—	95	—	—	46	—		English Graffiti
"Give Me a Sign"	2015	—	77	—	—	38	—		English Graffiti
"I Can't Quit"	2018	—	65	90	—	27	—		Combat Sports
"Nightclub"	2018	—	—	—	—	—	—		Combat Sports
"Your Love Is My Favourite Band"	2018	—	—	—	—	—	—		Combat Sports
"Put It On a T-Shirt"	2018	—	—	—	—	—	—		Combat Sports
"All My Friends Are Falling in Love"	2018	—	74	90	—	—	—	BPI: Silver	Non-album single
"Headphones Baby"	2021	—	93	—	—	—	—		Back in Love City
"Back in Love City"	2021	—	—	—	—	—	—		Back in Love City
"Alone Star"	2021	—	—	—	—	—	—		Back in Love City
"El Paso"	2021	—	—	—	—	—	—		Back in Love City
"Jump Off the Top"	2021	—	—	—	—	—	—		Back in Love City
"Thunder Fever"	2022	—	—	—	—	—	—		Planet of the Youth EP
"Disaster Girl"	2022	—	—	—	—	—	—		Planet of the Youth EP
"Heartbreak Kid"	2023	—	—	—	—	—	—		Pick-Up Full of Pink Carnations
"Sometimes, I Swear"	2023	—	—	—	—	—	—		Pick-Up Full of Pink Carnations
"Lunar Eclipse"	2023	—	—	—	—	—	—		Pick-Up Full of Pink Carnations
"Love to Walk Away"	2023	—	—	—	—	—	—		Pick-Up Full of Pink Carnations
"Discount De Kooning (Last One Standing)"	2024	—	—	—	—	—	—		Pick-Up Full of Pink Carnations
"—" denotes a title that did not chart, or was not released in that territory.

=== B-sides ===
Title	A-side	Year
"We're Happening"	"Post Break-Up Sex"	2011
"Out of the Way"	"If You Wanna" (Note: The single "If You Wanna" was released in two editions, the first featuring "Out of the Way" as the B-Side and the second featuring "It's All Good" as the B-Side.)	2011
"It's All Good"	"If You Wanna"	2011
"Good Guys Don't Wear White"	"If You Wanna"	2011
"Tuck and Roll"	"All in White"	2011
"Primal Urges"	"Nørgaard"	2011
"Tiger Blood"	"Wetsuit"	2011
"Blow Your Mind"	"No Hope"	2012
"Panic Attack"	"Teenage Icon"	2012
"Make You Mine"	"I Always Knew"	2012
"Living Out Your Dreams Backwards"	"Bad Mood"	2013
"Handsome Reimagined" (Dave Fridmann Edit)	"Handsome"	2015
"Dream Lover Reimagined" (Malcolm Zillion Edit)	"Dream Lover"	2015

== Guest appearances ==
Title	Year	Other artist(s)	Album
"LAZY"	2019	Kylie Minogue	A Shaun the Sheep Movie: Farmageddon (Original Motion Picture Soundtrack)
"Internet Disco"	2020	Agent Emotion	Songs for the National Health Service

== Music videos ==
Title	Year	Director	Reference
"Wreckin' Bar (Ra Ra Ra)"	2010	Douglas Hart	
"Blow It Up"	2010	Douglas Hart	—N/a
"Post Break-Up Sex"	2010	Stephen Angew	
"If You Wanna"	2011	Douglas Hart	
"All in White"	2011	Lope Serrano	—N/a
"Nørgaard"	2011	Bob Harlow	
"Wetsuit"	2011	Poppy de Villeneuve	
"Tiger Blood"	2011	Ollie Murray	
"No Hope"	2012	Jesse John Jenkins	
"Teenage Icon"	2012	Jesse John Jenkins	
"I Always Knew"	2012	Jesse John Jenkins	
"Bad Mood"	2013	D.A.R.Y.L	
"Melody Calling"	2013	Karan Kandhari	
"Handsome"	2015	Canada	
"Dream Lover"	2015	Canada	
"I Can't Quit"	2018	Daniel Brereton	
"Headphones Baby"	2021	Belle Hex	—N/a
"Alone Star"	2021	Mariana Arriaga	—N/a
"Thunder Fever"	2022	Nina Ljeti	—N/a
"Heartbreak Kid"	2023	—N/a	—N/a
"Lunar Eclipse"	2023	—N/a	—N/a
