= Freddie Cowan =

British musician

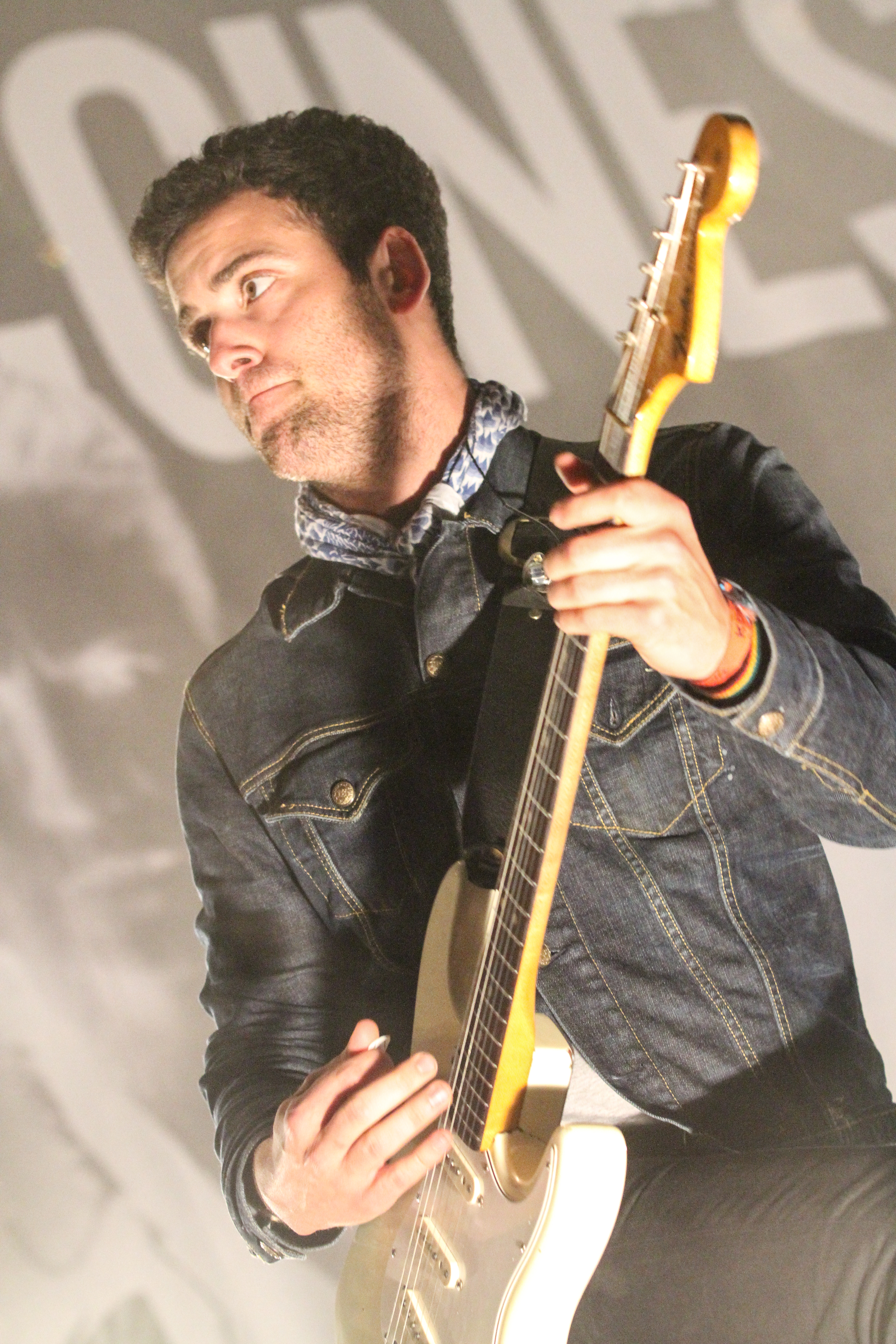
- Cowan at Immergut Festival in 2013

Background information
- Born: Fredrick Clayton Cowan
- Genres: Indie rock, garage rock, surf rock, post punk revival, rock
- Occupations: Performer, songwriter, fashion designer
- Instruments: Guitar, vocals
- Years active: 2010–present
- Labels: Columbia, Universal Music

Freddie Cowan is an English performer and songwriter. He is the co-founder and former lead guitarist of the indie rock band The Vaccines.

== Early life ==
He grew up in a musical family; his older brother, Tom Cowan, also known as Tom Furse, was a founding member of the English rock band the Horrors. This environment influenced his early interest in music.

== Career ==
In 2010, Cowan co-founded The Vaccines with Justin Young, Árni Árnason, and Pete Robertson. He contributed to their first five albums. Cowan left the band in 2022, just before they began work on their new record, Pick-Up Full of Pink Carnations.

In 2012, Cowan collaborated with his brother Tom from the Horrors, expressing concerns about the decline of pop music and highlighting the enduring appeal of guitar-driven tracks.

Cowan's guitar playing was influential in shaping The Vaccines' sound, which combines elements of post-punk, garage rock, and indie rock.

In 2016, Cowan founded the fashion brand Basic Rights.

After leaving The Vaccines, Cowan started a solo project called Freddie and the Scenarios. His debut album, inspired by his time in Mexico City, reflects a period of recovery from alcohol abuse and was seen as spiritually and creatively stimulating.

Cowan has spoken about the challenges of coping with sudden fame and the pressures of constant touring and recording, mentioning his reliance on alcohol during the early years of the band's success.

In 2023, Cowan's new band, Freddie & The Scenarios, released their debut album, Answer Machine. This project allowed him to explore different musical styles and collaborate with various artists from Mexico City's music scene.

During the COVID-19 lockdown, Cowan spent time in Scotland, which led to introspection and the creation of new music for his solo project.

As a songwriter, Cowan contributed to a UK Number 1 album, Come of Age, and five albums in the UK top 10. He has also performed on The Tonight Show Starring Jimmy Fallon in the US.

== Discography ==
Studio albums

- What Did You Expect from the Vaccines? (2011)
- Come of Age (2012)
- English Graffiti (2015)
- Combat Sports (2018)
- Back in Love City (2021)

== Awards and nominations ==
Year	Organisation	Nominated work	Award	Result
2011	BBC Sound of 2011	The Vaccines	Sound of 2011	Third
2011	Sweden GAFFA Awards	The Vaccines	Best Foreign New Act	Won
2011	MTV Awards	The Vaccines	Brand New for 2011	Nominated
2011	Quintessentially Awards	The Vaccines	Best Emerging Talent	Won
2011	MOJO Awards	The Vaccines	Best New Act	Nominated
2011	Q Awards	The Vaccines	Best New Band	Nominated
2011	BRIT Awards	The Vaccines	Critics' Choice	Runners-up
2012	NME Awards	The Vaccines	Best New Band	Won
2012	NME Awards	What Did You Expect from the Vaccines?	Best Album	Nominated
2012	XFM	The Vaccines	New Music Award	Won
2012	BRIT Awards	The Vaccines	Best New Artist	Nominated
2013	NME Awards	The Vaccines	Best British Band	Nominated
2013	NME Awards	Come of Age	Best Album	Nominated
2013	BRIT Awards	The Vaccines	Best Live Act	Nominated

== Personal life ==
Cowan cites John Lennon, Nick Cave, Paul Simonon, Jimi Hendrix, and Buddy Holly as style icons.

Cowan has been open about his struggles with sobriety and its impact on his life and music. During the COVID-19 lockdown, he reflected on his life and career, significantly influencing his solo music.

In addition to his musical career, Cowan is a practitioner of Brazilian jiu-jitsu and incorporates elements of fitness and discipline from the martial art into his daily life.
