= Halloweens =

Musical side project by members of The Vaccines

Halloweens is a side project by The Vaccines members Justin Young and Timothy Lanham. They have released two albums, eight singles, and one EP.

== Background ==
Justin Young and Timothy Lanham teamed up after writing The Vaccines 2018 album Combat Sports together.

== Discography ==
=== Albums ===
- Morning Kiss at the Acropolis (2020)
- Opera Singing at the Salsa Bar (2024)

=== Singles ===
- Hannah, You're Amazing (2019)
- My Baby Looks Good With Another (2020)
- Divinity Pools (2020)
- Lonely Boy Forever (2020)
- Trophies for Pain (Minsky Rock Remix) (2020)
- Brothers in Arms (2020)
- Other Men's Flowers (2022)
- Colombia Record (2024)

=== EP's ===
- Maserati Anxiety Designed (EP, 2020)
