= Radiosoul =

Studio album by Alfie Templeman
- Released: 7 June 2024
- Recorded: 2022 and 2023
- Genre: Indie rock; indie pop; funk rock; psych rock; experimental rock
- Length: 38:43
- Label: Chess Club

Alfie Templeman chronology
Mellow Moon (2022)	Radiosoul (2024)

Singles from Radiosoul
- 1. "Eyes Wide Shut" Released: 13 February 2024; 2. "Radiosoul" Released: 7 March 2024; 3. "Hello Lonely" Released: 19 April 2024; 4. "Beckham" Released: 21 May 2024; 5. "Just a Dance" Released: 2 June 2024

Radiosoul is the second studio album by English singer-songwriter Alfie Templeman. It was released on 7 June 2024 through Chess Club Records, with distribution from AWAL.

The album was supported by five promotional singles: "Eyes Wide Shut", "Radiosoul", "Hello Lonely", "Beckham" and "Just a Dance" (featuring Nile Rodgers).

== Background and recording ==
Radiosoul followed Templeman's debut album, Mellow Moon, which was released in 2022; up to that point, the artist had released gradually longer EPs every year, but decided to switch his release schedule once he started working on his second LP.

Although Templeman had started writing some of the songs on the album back in 2017, the recording sessions took place between February and July 2023, as the artist traveled to Los Angeles and Miami, before going back to South London, where he had moved to with his girlfriend from Bedford. As opposed to Mellow Moon, which Templeman had written and produced by himself in his bedroom during the COVID-19 pandemic, partially due to his childhood interstitial lung disease (first diagnosed in 2019), the artist worked with various other producers on Radiosoul, with the likes of Will Bloomfield, Justin Young, Dan Carey, Charlie J. Perry, Josh Scarbrow, Karma Kid, Oscar Scheller and Nile Rodgers – who co-produced and featured on the song "Just A Dance" – all being involved in the recording process. In an interview with Dork, Templeman claimed that he became more open to collaborations in order to fulfill his artistic ambitions better:

All the best melodies I've had are ones that come to you. You sit there, and you internalise everything, and the next minute, it's there. I do often think about that, and how you can dream a song, and hear it in your head, and just put it down. How it materialises from just a thought is so interesting to me. It's incredible. This is why I worked with other producers this time, because on Mellow Moon, I had so many good ideas that I just wasn't capable of doing myself. [...] It was such a shame that some of those ideas were only 85% [brought to light], instead of 100%. With this record, it was about making sure I maximised those ideas, and made them as close to what I imagined as possible.

== Music and lyrics ==
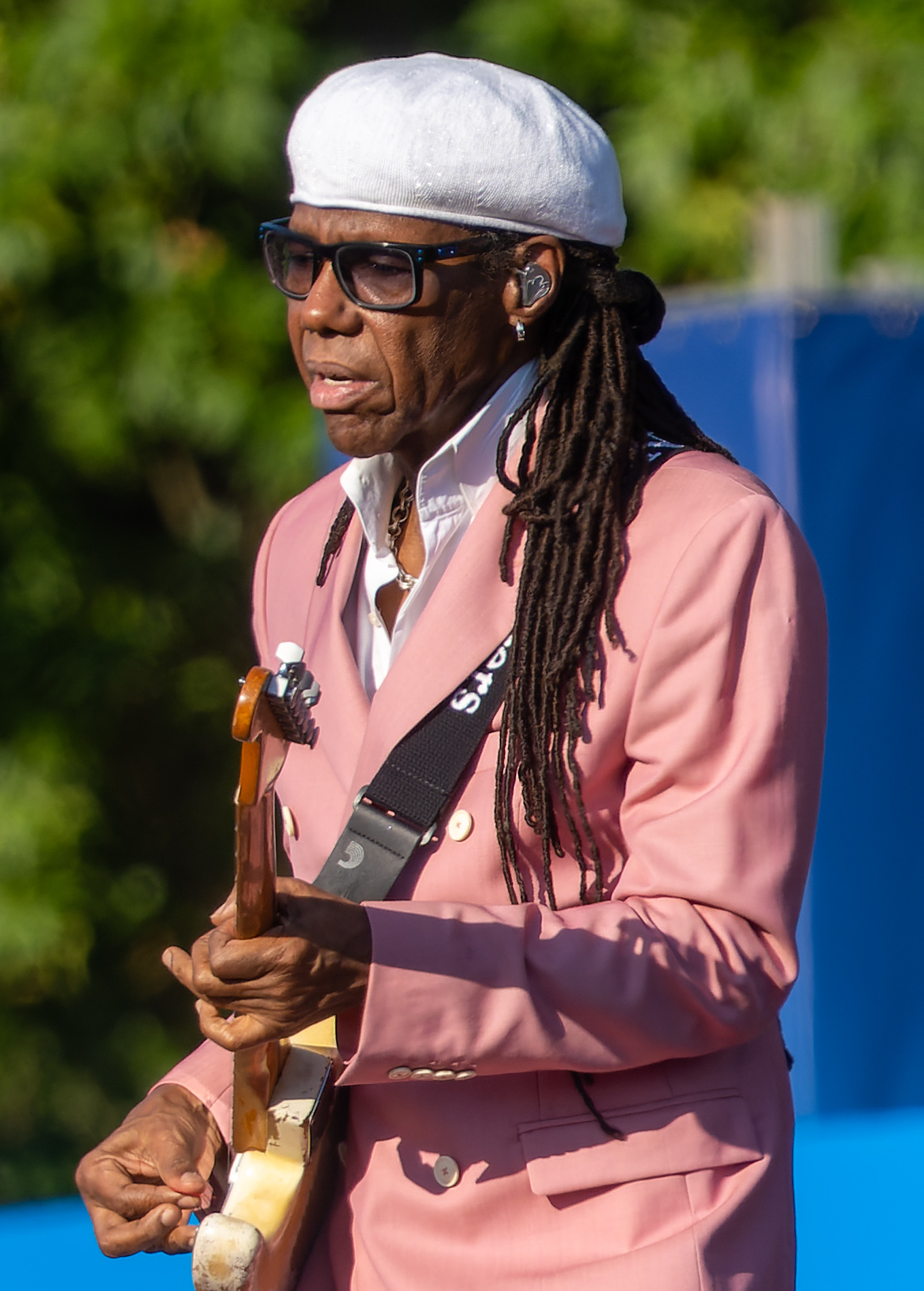
Nile Rodgers was cited by Templeman as one of the main inspirations for Radiosoul; the two artists first met in 2021, and collaborated for the single "Just a Dance".

Sonically, Radiosoul was considered to be more experimental and adventurous than Templeman's previous album, Mellow Moon, and his earlier works, which were mostly centered around indie pop; the various songs on the LP incorporate elements of indie rock, R&B, neo soul, disco, and jazz, among other genres. The artist himself described the project as "incohesively cohesive", while citing the likes of Stereolab, MGMT, Dua Lipa, Prince, Talking Heads, The Beatles, Todd Rundgren, David Bowie and Nile Rodgers—who he had first met with in 2021 and featured on the song "Just a Dance"—as his main inspirations for the album.

From a lyrical point of view, the album mainly focuses on Templeman's shift from adolescence to early adulthood, as well as other personal experiences; the topics include his struggles with mood swings and burnout while touring ("Eyes Wide Shut"), the negative effects of social media overuse (the title track), isolation during the COVID-19 pandemic ("Hello Lonely"), his move to London ("Beckham") and his anxiety issues ("Run to Tomorrow"). He also stated that Radiosoul reflected his more mature and meaningful approach to lyrics in comparison to his earlier works, as he explained in an interview with DIY:

I'm so fed up of being nonsensical [in my songs]. I very much want to write things that I can go back to and say, "Oh, that's where I was exactly in that moment". I've always wanted to document my life through EPs and albums, but I feel like with this album, it actually really is doing that. Mellow Moon did it a little, but more so with just being a pandemic album. In the pandemic, we weren't really doing much, so what am I actually singing about? I don't know, just being stuck inside! Now, no one wants to fucking talk about that anymore! With this album, it's about what happens after coming out of it, and saying, "I'm a bit fuzzy".

== Release and promotion ==
The lead single from Radiosoul, "Eyes Wide Shut", was released on 13 February 2024, together with an official music video. The album was first announced on 7 March of the same year, with the title track also being released as the second single, alongside an official lyric video. The third single from the project, "Hello Lonely", was released on 19 April, together with a music video.

The fourth single, "Beckham", was released on 21 May; the song had originally been previewed by Templeman back in June 2023, during a live session for Polish radio station Radio Kolor. In May 2024, the artist performed on the New Music Stage at BBC Radio 1's Big Weekend festival in Luton, where he played an unreleased song from the LP, "Just a Dance"; the track, featuring Nile Rodgers, was officially released as the fifth and final single from the album on 2 June 2024.

As part of the album's promotional campaign, Templeman held a series of in-store concerts at record stores across the United Kingdom in June 2024; from October to December of the same year, he's scheduled for an international headline tour, which includes performances in the United States, Mexico, the UK, the Netherlands, Germany, Belgium and France.

== Critical reception ==
Professional ratings
Review scores
Source	Rating
DIY	4.5/5 stars
Dork	4/5 stars
Paste	7.8/10
The Line of Best Fit	7/10

Daisy Carter of DIY gave the album a highly positive review, describing it as "a technicolour triumph that's [Templeman's] most ambitious, maximalist, and forward-facing work yet"; she also praised the album's themes and stylistic versatility, naming Scissor Sisters, Declan McKenna and Nile Rodgers as examples of artists whose influence could be heard throughout the project.

Writing for Paste, Alyssa Goldberg noted Radiosoul's overall cohesiveness and originality, writing quote, "While maintaining the joy and electric groove of his earlier work, the record brings forth a newfound complexity to Templeman's lyricism and production". Dan Harrison of Dork praised Templeman's artistic progress in comparison to his previous works, writing that "in many ways, Radiosoul feels like the debut album [he] always wanted to make".

In a milder review for The Line of Best Fit, Tanatat Khuttapan wrote that the album's final leg felt like "a cooldown that forgoes the riveting momentum set up earlier", while noting that a few tracks recalled Harry Styles' 2022 album Harry's House. Nevertheless, he described Templeman as "a potent star yet to arise", writing that "sometimes, gradual progression hits the jackpot more certainly than a leap forward".

== Track listing ==
Radiosoul track listing
No.	Title	Writer(s)	Producer(s)	Length
1.	"Radiosoul"	Alfie Templeman; Charlie J. Perry	Perry	5:15
2.	"Eyes Wide Shut"	Templeman; Justin Hayward-Young; Will Bloomfield	Bloomfield; Cameron Poole^{[v]}	3:22
3.	"This Is Just the Beginning"	Templeman; Oscar Scheller	Scheller	3:26
4.	"Vultures"	Templeman	Templeman	3:32
5.	"Drag"	Templeman; Sam Knowles	Karma Kid	3:07
6.	"Hello Lonely"	Templeman; Bloomfield; Hayward-Young	Bloomfield; Poole^{[v]}	3:31
7.	"Just a Dance" (featuring Nile Rodgers)	Templeman; Nile Gregory Rodgers Jr.; Bloomfield	Bloomfield; Rodgers; Templeman; Poole^{[v]}	2:41
8.	"Submarine"	Templeman; Josh Scarbrow	Scarbrow	3:24
9.	"Beckham"	Templeman; Dan Carey	Carey	3:27
10.	"Switch"	Templeman; Knowles	Karma Kid	2:37
11.	"Run to Tomorrow"	Templeman; Carey	Carey	4:23
Total length:				38:43

Note

- ^{^[v]} signifies a vocal producer

== Personnel ==
Musicians

- Alfie Templeman – vocals, guitars (all tracks), bass (tracks 1–4, 6–9), drums (1, 2, 4, 8, 9, 11), sound effects (2), synthesizers (3, 5), drum machine (4, 7); theremin, cello (4); tape delay effects (5), organ (6); chamber vocals, bass solo (7); piano (8–10), slide guitar (8); sitar, tape echo effects (10)
- Charlie J. Perry – backing vocals, guitars, piano, synthesizers (track 1)
- Josh Arcoleo – saxophone (track 1)
- Will Bloomfield – backing vocals, sound effects (tracks 2, 6); synthesizers (2, 7), drum programming (6, 7), keyboards (6)
- Oscar Scheller – keyboards, synthesizers, drum programming (track 4)
- Karma Kid – synth bass, drum programming (5, 10); synthesizers, tape delay effects (5); tape echo, electric bass, sound effects (10)
- Russell Graham – synth bass, drum programming (track 7)
- Nile Rodgers – guitars (track 7)
- Josh Scarbrow – keyboards, bass, percussion, guitars, sound effects (track 8)
- Dan Carey – bass, synthesizers, slide guitar (9, 11); Swarmatron, drum machine, vocals, sound effects (9); guitars, drum programming (11)

Technical

- Kevin Tuffy – mastering
- Cenzo Townshend – mixing
- Alfie Templeman – mastering assistance

== Charts ==
Chart performance for Radiosoul
Chart (2024)	Peak position
Scottish Albums (OCC)	29
UK Albums (OCC)	57
UK Independent Albums (OCC)	3
