= Happiness in Liquid Form =

Single by Alfie Templeman

from the EP Happiness in Liquid Form
- Released: 7 April 2020
- Genre: Pop, disco, funk
- Length: 3:32
- Label: Chess Club Records
- Songwriters: Alfie Templeman; Justin Hayward-Young; William Bloomfield
- Producers: Justin Hayward-Young; William Bloomfield

Alfie Templeman singles chronology
"Don't Go Wasting Time" (2019)	"Happiness in Liquid Form" (2020)	"My Best Friend" (2020)

"Happiness in Liquid Form" is a song by English singer-songwriter, multi-instrumentalist and producer Alfie Templeman. It was released on 7 April 2020 as the lead single from his EP, Happiness in Liquid Form. The song was written by Alfie Templeman, Justin Hayward-Young and William Bloomfield.

== Background ==
Talking about the song, Templeman said, "'Happiness…' is the most colourful sugary disco-pop song I've put out so far. It came about so easily one day in the studio with Justin from The Vaccines and his right-hand man Will and by the end of the day we knew we had something special on our hands." He also talked about the coronavirus crisis, "It's a tough time for everyone right now so hope this brings a little happiness into people's lives!" He wrote the song in the summer of 2019 and when he spoke to Jack Saunders upon its first play, he described the song as 'amazingly funky', "It was summertime so we wanted to write something that was a bit of a banger, basically."

== Lyric video ==
A lyric video for the song was released on 7 April 2020 at a total length of three minutes and thirty-three seconds.

== Personnel ==
Credits adapted from Tidal.

- Justin Hayward-Young – producer, composer, lyricist
- William Bloomfield – producer, composer, lyricist
- Alfie Templeman – composer, lyricist

== Charts ==
Chart (2020)	Peak position
Belgium (Ultratip Bubbling Under Flanders)	41
San Marino (SMRRTV Top 50)	30
