= XCT =

XCT or xct may refer to:

- Aero Costa Taxi Aéreo (ICAO: XCT), a Mexican airline; see List of airline codes (A)
- Classical Tibetan (ISO 639-3: xct), the language of any text written in Tibetic after the Old Tibetan period
- "XCT", a 2021 song by The Vaccines from Back in Love City
- A mnemonic for the execute instruction on some computer architectures
- Northern Cyprus, its machine-readable passport code
