= Matthew Hitt =

Welsh model and musician

- Born: May 30, 1987 (age 39); Rhondda, Wales, United Kingdom
- Instruments: Keyboard, guitar, vocals
- Years active: 2008–present
- Member of: Drowners
- Formerly of: The Muscle Club

Matthew James Hitt (born 30 May 1987) is a Welsh model and musician, known as the lead singer and guitarist for the American-Welsh indie rock band Drowners. In 2023, he joined the Vaccines as a touring member. As of Summer 2025, he is still touring with them.

== Early life ==
Hitt was born and raised in Rhondda, Wales. He has a degree in English literature from Cardiff University.

== Career ==
=== Modeling ===
Hitt moved to New York City in 2011 in order to pursue modelling.

=== The Muscle Club (2008–2010) ===
Hitt was a member of the London band The Muscle Club.

=== Drowners (2011–present) ===
Drowners was created after Hitt moved to New York in order to further pursue his career in modelling. Hitt said in 2013 that, "I moved to New York two years ago and met all these boys through boozing with them, basically. We found out that we all played instruments. We all have a common interest in rock 'n roll music and then could go off on our other tangents." The band name was created when Justin Young called Hitt asking if he had a band together and if he wanted to open for his band The Vaccines which had skyrocketed in success rather quickly. The band had not had a name then and Hitt had been listening to "The Drowners" by Suede when he picked the name. Hitt described his lyrics as "miserable to an upbeat danceable tune".
