= NEHI (disambiguation) =

NEHI is the Network for Excellence in Health Innovation, an American research and policy organization.

Nehi or NEHI may also refer to:

- Nehi, a flavored soft drink
- Nehi (Viceroy of Kush) or Nehy, an Ancient Egyptian official with the titles of a viceroy of Kush
- Neuroendocrine hyperplasia of infancy, a lung disease found in children
- The Nanotechnology Environmental and Health Implications working group, a body within the National Nanotechnology Initiative
