= Mellow Moon =

Studio album by Alfie Templeman
- Released: 27 May 2022
- Recorded: 2020 and 2021
- Genre: Indie pop
- Length: 45:03
- Label: Chess Club
- Producer: William Bloomfield; Justin Hayward-Young; Thomas McFarland; Rob Milton; Charlie J. Perry; Kieran Shudall; Alfie Templeman

Alfie Templeman chronology
Forever Isn't Long Enough (2021)	Mellow Moon (2022)	Radiosoul (2024)

Singles from Mellow Moon
- 1. "3D Feelings" Released: 3 November 2021; 2. "Broken" Released: 2 February 2022; 3. "Leaving Today" Released: 4 April 2022; 4. "Colour Me Blue" Released: 13 April 2022

Mellow Moon is the debut studio album by English singer-songwriter, multi-instrumentalist, and producer Alfie Templeman. It was released on 27 May 2022 via Chess Club Records. Templeman co-wrote all fourteen of the tracks on the album and co-produced eight of them. In interviews, Templeman noted the album's sonic diversity, describing it as a mix of R&B, pop, folk, rock and jazz. Regarding the album's title, Templeman explained that "It's my safe space, the “Mellow Moon”. Because sometimes, I feel I’m on a different planet, I go somewhere else. So, I can just melt into this moon and feel free enough for a little while, so I’m inviting people to the Mellow Moon, in a way."

== Singles ==
The album's first single, "3D Feelings", was released on 3 November 2021 and was produced by Justin Young, the frontman of The Vaccines, and Will Bloomfield. In an interview with NME, Templeman stated that the song is "about being reminded of your past self in different ways. Whether it's objects or people, these are all things we feel a deja vu experience from. We get reminded of feelings we once felt through them, and those feelings just hit you and can't be controlled. It can be a comforting experience, or a painful one, but either way it takes you back immediately to that feeling you once felt and that can be so powerful. The song came together so quickly as a fun jam between Will & I, the opening guitar lick was made up on the spot after we found a really nice chord progression for me to solo over. Justin then inspired me to write some really cool lyrics for this one, they flow so effortlessly and they're really fun to sing."

Mellow Moon was officially announced on 2 February 2022 alongside the release of "Broken", the second single. Of the album, Templeman explained "Everything I've been working towards for the past few years has led to this record but I think it's great. It's basically everything that I've ever done, taken to a higher level." Discussing "Broken", which has been described as a sonic meshing of Nile Rodgers and Radiohead, Templeman described it as "a good representation of what's gone on in the past couple of years and how people my age are feeling: It explores the smaller thoughts and fears that nobody really brings up because there are bigger things going on in the world right now but really, your mental wellbeing is just as valid as anything else." Describing the mental health focus of the album, he added: "I've spoken about mental health to friends and on social media, but I've never been this open about it in my music. Because of that, I didn't want to go too emo straight away."

"Leaving Today", the album's third single, was released on 4 April 2022, which was co-produced by Templeman and Tom McFarland. Discussing the track, Templeman explained that it was influenced by the COVID-19 pandemic and “was written about what it would be like to go on tour again after so long. Getting far away from home and sitting in that van for hours thinking about all the small things you never realized you missed so much”. The track was a musical experiment for Templeman, who noted that "It's the first song I've played cello on, I tried to layer up multiple different parts as if it was a mini orchestra of terrible cello players! Tom was super encouraging with the cello stuff, and he added some really gorgeous production, all the oohs you hear at the start are him."

The album's final single, "Colour Me Blue", was released a week later on 13 April 2022. Co-produced by Templeman and Kieran Shudall, the track is "a song about that wave rushing through you that you feel when you fall in love."

== Critical reception ==
The Guardian awarded the album three stars, with reviewer Alexis Petridis declaring it an "upbeat debut with surprising sonic touches [which] succeeds as amiable, fresh-faced pop, yet there’s a feeling of a young artist pulling his punches."

== Track listing ==
Mellow Moon track listing
No.	Title	Writer(s)	Producer(s)	Length
1.	"A Western"	Charlie J. Perry; Alfie Templeman	Perry; Templeman	2:56
2.	"You're a Liar"	Templeman	Thomas McFarland; Templeman	2:45
3.	"Broken"	Templeman	William Bloomfield; Justin Hayward-Young	3:12
4.	"Folding Mountains"	Templeman	Templeman; Hayward-Young	2:47
5.	"3D Feelings"	Bloomfield; Templeman; Justin Young	Bloomfield; Young	3:17
6.	"Candyfloss"	Templeman	Hayward-Young; Templeman	2:48
7.	"Best Feeling"	Templeman	Templeman	3:02
8.	"Do It"	Rob Milton; Templeman	Milton	3:02
9.	"Colour Me Blue"	Kieran Shudall; Templeman	Shudall	3:16
10.	"Galaxy"	Templeman	William Bloomfield; Hayward-Young	3:09
11.	"Leaving Today"	McFarland; Templeman	McFarland; Templeman	4:12
12.	"Take Some Time Away"	Templeman	Templeman	3:44
13.	"Mellow Moon"	Templeman	William Bloomfield; Hayward-Young	3:32
14.	"Just Below the Above"	Templeman	Templeman	3:14
Total length:				45:03

== Personnel ==
- Alfie Templeman – vocals, drums, percussion, electric guitar, acoustic guitar, bass guitar, keys, sitar, flute, cello
- Charlie Perry – guitar and additional drums (track 1)
- Will Bloomfield – synth, drum programming and backing vocals (tracks 3, 4, 5, 6, 10 and 13)
- Rob Milton – synths, drum programming and bass programming (track 8)
- Kieran Shudall – bass fills, drum programming, backing vocals and first guitar solo (track 9)
- Tom McFarland – synth and guitar (track 11)

== Charts ==
Chart performance for Mellow Moon
Chart (2022)	Peak position
Scottish Albums Chart	16
UK Albums Chart	31
UK Indie Album Chart	1
