= Dream Lover (The Vaccines song) =

Single by the Vaccines

from the album English Graffiti
- Released: 18 May 2015
- Recorded: 2014
- Genre: Indie rock
- Length: 3:45
- Label: Columbia Records
- Songwriter(s): The Vaccines
- Producer(s): The Vaccines, David Fridmann, Cole MGN

The Vaccines singles chronology
"Handsome" (2015)	"Dream Lover" (2015)	"I Can't Quit" (2018)

Music video
- "Dream Lover" on YouTube

"Dream Lover" is a song from English indie rock band the Vaccines. The track was released in the United Kingdom on 18 May 2015 as the second single from the band's third studio album, English Graffiti (2015). The track premiered on 30 March as BBC Radio 1 DJ Huw Stephens' Hottest Record in the World. Frontman Justin Young described the track as "the best pop song we've written".

== Track listing ==
7" Vinyl
No.	Title	Length
1.	"Dream Lover"	3:45
2.	"Dream Lover Reimagined" (Malcolm Zillion Edit)	3:57

== Charts ==
Chart (2015)	Peak position
Belgium (Ultratip Bubbling Under Flanders)	67
UK Singles (Official Charts Company)	155

== Release history ==
Region	Date	Format
United Kingdom	18 May 2015	7" Vinyl
