= Teenage Icon =

Single by the Vaccines

from the album Come of Age
- B-side: "Panic Attack"
- Released: 2 September 2012
- Recorded: 2012
- Genre: Indie rock, surf punk
- Length: 3:05
- Label: Columbia Records
- Songwriter(s): The Vaccines

The Vaccines singles chronology
"No Hope" (2012)	"Teenage Icon" (2012)	"I Always Knew" (2012)

Music video
- "Teenage Icon" on YouTube

"Teenage Icon" is a song from English indie rock band the Vaccines. The track was released in the United Kingdom on 2 September 2012 as the second single from the band's second studio album, Come of Age (2012). The track was unveiled by the band on 19 July, and has since been introduced to the band's live setlist. A four-track extended play was made available in August, including the B-side "Panic Attack".

Rolling Stone named the song the 14th best song of 2012.

== Track listing ==
Digital EP
No.	Title	Length
1.	"Teenage Icon"	3:05
2.	"Panic Attack"	2:11
3.	"Teenage Icon" (Live in Brighton)	2:54
4.	"Teenage Icon" (Demo)	3:23

== Live performances ==
The band performed "Teenage Icon" for BBC Radio 1's Live Lounge on 3 September 2012, also performing a cover of American artist Taylor Swift's "We Are Never Ever Getting Back Together".

== Charts ==
Chart (2012)	Peak position
Belgium (Ultratip Bubbling Under Flanders)	14
Mexico Ingles Airplay (Billboard)	11
UK Singles (OCC)	39

== Release history ==
Region	Date	Format
United Kingdom	19 July 2012	Radio airplay
United Kingdom	2 September 2012	Digital download
