= I Always Knew =

Single by the Vaccines

from the album Come of Age
- B-side: "Make You Mine"
- Released: 18 November 2012
- Recorded: 2012
- Genre: Indie rock
- Length: 3:34
- Label: Columbia Records
- Songwriter(s): The Vaccines

The Vaccines singles chronology
"Teenage Icon" (2012)	"I Always Knew" (2012)	"Bad Mood" (2013)

"I Always Knew" is a single by English indie rock band the Vaccines. The track was released in the United Kingdom on 18 November 2012 as the third single from the band's second studio album, Come of Age (2012). It was also used in the season 2 finale of the hit US television show New Girl.

== Track listing ==
Digital download
No.	Title	Length
1.	"I Always Knew"	3:34
2.	"Make You Mine"	3:33
3.	"I Always Knew" (Demo)	4:13

== Charts ==
Chart (2012)	Peak position
Belgium (Ultratip Bubbling Under Flanders)	17
UK Singles (Official Charts Company)	169

== Release history ==
Region	Date	Format
United Kingdom	18 November 2012	Digital download
