= No Hope =

Single by The Vaccines

from the album Come of Age
- B-side: "Blow Your Mind"
- Released: 8 July 2012
- Recorded: 2011 (Demo); 2012 (Studio)
- Genre: Power pop, indie rock, post-punk revival
- Length: 4:05
- Label: Columbia Records
- Songwriter: The Vaccines

The Vaccines singles chronology
| "Why Should I Love You?" (2011) | "No Hope" (2012) | "Teenage Icon" (2012) |

Music video
- "No Hope" on YouTube

"No Hope" is a song from London-based quartet The Vaccines. The track was released in the United Kingdom on 8 July 2012 as the lead single from the band's second studio album, Come of Age (2012). "No Hope" received its first play on 28 May 2012 when it featured as BBC Radio 1 DJ Zane Lowe's Hottest Record in the World. A four-track extended play was made available to pre-order shortly afterwards, including the B-side "Blow Your Mind" which was written and sung by bass player Arni Hjorvar to tie in with the artwork which depicts a young girl resembling him.

== Track listing ==
Digital EP
| No. | Title | Length |
|---|---|---|
| 1. | "No Hope" | 4:05 |
| 2. | "Blow Your Mind" | 2:10 |
| 3. | "No Hope" (Live in Brighton) | 4:15 |
| 4. | "No Hope" (Demo) | 4:09 |

== Charts ==
| Chart (2012) | Peak position |
|---|---|
| Belgium (Ultratip Bubbling Under Flanders) | 74 |
| UK Singles (OCC) | 37 |

== Release history ==
| Region | Date | Format |
|---|---|---|
| United Kingdom | 28 May 2012 | Radio airplay |
| United Kingdom | 8 July 2012 | Digital Download |
