= Gibbet Mill, Rye =

Windmill in Rye, East Sussex, England

Rye Windmill
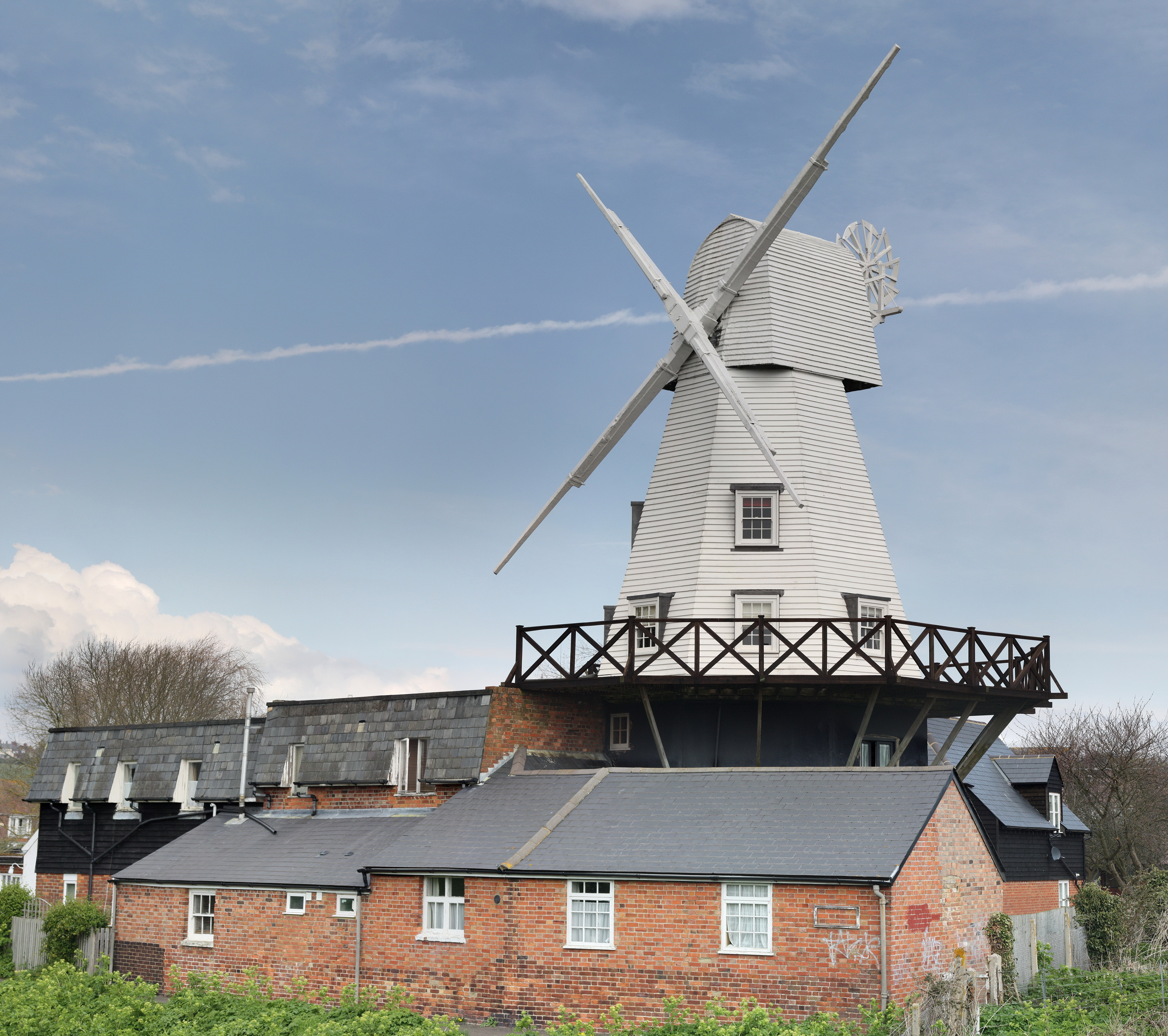
- The mill in 2009

Origin
- Mill name: Gibbet Mill; Tillingham Mill; Barry's Mill; New Mill
- Mill location: TQ 917 203
- Coordinates: 50°57′00″N 0°43′41″E
- Operator(s): Private
- Year built: 1824

Information
- Purpose: Corn mill
- Type: Smock mill
- Storeys: Four-storey smock
- Base storeys: Single-storey base
- Smock sides: Eight sides
- No. of sails: Four sails
- Type of sails: Spring sails
- Windshaft: Cast iron
- Winding: Fantail
- Fantail blades: Eight blades
- No. of pairs of millstones: Three pairs
- Year lost: 1932
- Other information: Replica body constructed on original base.

Gibbet Mill, Tillingham Mill, Barry's Mill or New Mill is a grade II listed cosmetically reconstructed smock mill at Rye, East Sussex, England. Today it serves as bed and breakfast accommodation.

== History ==
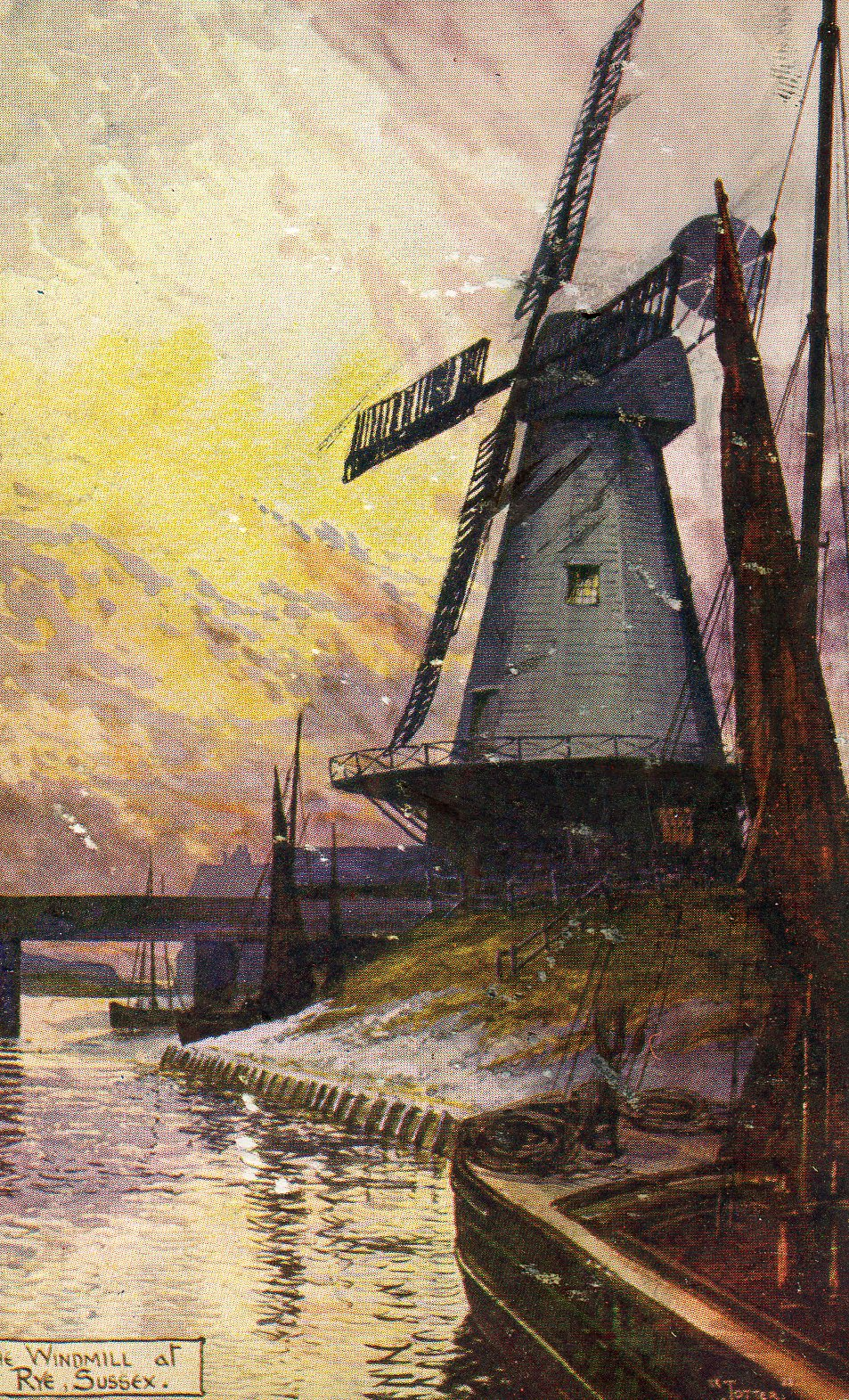
Gibbet Mill from an old postcard, by artist Walter Hayward-Young

A mill has stood on this site since 1596, and a post mill is known to have been built here in 1758. Gibbet Mill was built in 1824, the name Barry's mill coming from an early miller. The mill was working by wind until 1912, and was used as a bakery until 13 June 1930 when it was burnt down. The new mill was erected in 1932, Neve's of Heathfield being responsible for the millwrighting work.

== Description ==
As built, Gibbett Mill was a four-storey smock mill on a single-storey brick base, with a stage at first-floor level. In 1844 she had four Patent sails but latterly was worked with four Spring sails. These were carried in a cast-iron Windshaft. The cap was in the Kentish style, winded by a fantail. The mill drove three pairs of millstones.

The replica mill bears very little resemblance to an actual working windmill. It has a shorter smock, making the mill appear squatter than the original. The cap is exaggerated in height and is not designed to turn into the wind. Replica sails and fantail are carried. The reconstructed stage is wider than the original.

== Millers ==
- Frederick Barry: 1824–1844
- John Smith: 1848–1879
- Gorge Standed: 1882–1899
- Webb: 1917

References for above:-
