= English Graffiti =

Studio album by The Vaccines
- Released: 25 May 2015
- Recorded: 2013–2014
- Genres: Indie rock; pop rock
- Length: 35:14
- Label: Columbia
- Producers: Dave Fridmann, Cole M. Greif-Neill, The Vaccines, Charlie Klarsfeld (only Deluxe Edition)

The Vaccines chronology
Melody Calling (2013)	English Graffiti (2015)	Combat Sports (2018)

Singles from English Graffiti
- 1. "Handsome" Released: 8 March 2015; 2. "Dream Lover" Released: 18 May 2015; 3. "20/20" Released: 24 July 2015

English Graffiti is the third studio album by English rock band The Vaccines. It was produced by Dave Fridmann, with co-production from Cole M. Greif-Neill at Fridmann's New York studio. The album was released on 25 May 2015 through Columbia Records and charted at #2 upon release. The album marked the band's first release in two years, following the Melody Calling EP, and their first full studio album release in three, following Come of Age in 2012. Young stated that Fridmann was chosen due to both his track record in making "consistently fantastic records". It is the last album recorded with drummer Pete Robertson, who left the band after completing their 2016 U.S. tour.

== Promotion ==
The Vaccines revealed the first single to be released from the album as "Handsome" on 19 January 2015. The track was Zane Lowe's Hottest Record on BBC Radio 1 that evening and a video followed online soon after. The single was officially released on 8 March 2015 as a digital download. On 30 March, the second single "Dream Lover" also aired as Hottest Record on BBC Radio 1, and a music video was released on 1 April. The single was released on 18 May, a week before the album's release.

The album was released on 25 May on compact disc, vinyl LP and as a digital download. The album was released as two versions, a standard edition release as well as a deluxe edition, featuring three bonus tracks as well as four 're-imaginings' of the album's singles and other tracks. The band also produced a limited number of signed copies of their album, on both CD and LP, available through the band's official website. These editions feature a signed insert by the four members of the band.

The song 20/20 was released as the fourth single on 7′ vinyl in July 2015. The release featured a ‘reimagined’ version of the track on the B-side. 20/20 was used in an Amazon and Chase commercial in December 2015.

== Critical reception ==
Professional ratings
Aggregate scores
Source	Rating
Metacritic	73/100
Review scores
Source	Rating
AllMusic	3.5/5 stars
NME	8/10
The Guardian	4/5 stars
PopMatters	8/10
DIY (magazine)	4/5 stars
The Line of Best Fit	7/10
Pitchfork	6.3/10
Drowned in Sound	5/10

English Graffiti received generally positive reviews. On Metacritic (which assigns a weighted average out of 100 from mainstream critics), the album has received a score of 73 ("generally favorable reviews"), based on 15 reviews. Stephen Thomas Erlewine of AllMusic gave the album a 3.5/5 star rating, saying that "these are candied sonic fantasias, passionate re-creations of the past with no reverence for history, and that divine, stubborn nostalgia fuels English Graffiti, turning it into the Vaccines' best record." Reviewer Stephen Ackroyd of DIY scored the album 4/5 saying "This is a band able to play pop magpies of the highest grade." British publication NME reviewed the album highly positively with writer Barry Nicholson awarding it 8/10 and claiming that "The indie titans return with a kitschier, more colourful, genre-spanning version of their old selves." The Guardian's Dave Simpson also positively reviewed English Graffiti, referencing that "the reinvention The Vaccines promised on their second album, Come of Age has been delivered by their third."

In a mixed review, Laura Snapes of Pitchfork claimed that "The Vaccines sought out Dave Fridmann...to work on their third album, and it's their best yet. Part of English Graffiti's success is due to the fact that the London post punks sound borderline-unrecognizable on it." Snapes also noted that it is "retreading the fittingly empty pound of 'Post Break-Up Sex' from 2011 debut What Did You Expect from The Vaccines?" and ultimately rated the album 6.3/10.

== Chart performance ==
Despite gaining critical success, the release performed less well in the charts. Entering at number 2 in the UK Albums Chart, English Graffiti fell to number 20 in the second week and quickly tumbled out of the top 50. None of the singles from English Graffiti managed to break into the top 50 of the UK Singles Chart, and two failed to chart at all.

== Influences ==
Lead singer and songwriter Justin Young cites "I Couldn't Say It to Your Face" by Arthur Russell, "On Melancholy Hill" by Gorillaz and "Beautiful Lady" by Shin Jung-hyeon as his major inspirations during the writing of this album.

== Track listing ==
All lyrics are written by Justin Young; all music is composed by The Vaccines and Cole M. Greif-Neill unless otherwise stated.

No.	Title	Length
1.	"Handsome"	2:20
2.	"Dream Lover"	3:45
3.	"Minimal Affection"	4:00
4.	"20/20"	3:08
5.	"(All Afternoon) In Love"	3:54
6.	"Denial"	3:00
7.	"Want You So Bad"	4:18
8.	"Radio Bikini"	2:06
9.	"Maybe I Could Hold You"	3:10
10.	"Give Me a Sign"	3:33
11.	"Undercover"	2:00

Deluxe edition bonus tracks
No.	Title	Writer(s)	Length
12.	"English Graffiti"	The Vaccines	3:28
13.	"Stranger"	The Vaccines; Khalil Abdul-Rahman; Daniel Tannenbaum	3:02
14.	"Miracle"	The Vaccines; Abdul-Rahman; Tannenbaum	3:28
15.	"Handsome" (Reimagined) (Dave Fridmann Edit)		2:21
16.	"Dream Lover" (Reimagined) (Malcolm Zillion Edit)		3:57
17.	"20/20" (Reimagined) (Dave Fridmann Edit)		3:16
18.	"Give Me a Sign" (Reimagined) (Co Co T Edit)		4:21

== Personnel ==
- Justin Young—vocals, rhythm guitar
- Freddie Cowan—lead guitar
- Arni Arnason—bass guitar
- Pete Robertson—drums

Additional musicians

- Jon Fridmann—trombone (track 2), trumpet (track 2)
- Mary Gavazzi Fridmann—backing vocals (track 14)

== Charts ==
Chart (2015)	Peak position
Australian Albums (ARIA)	48

== Certifications ==
Region	Certification	Certified units/sales
United Kingdom (BPI)	Gold	100,000^{‡}
^{‡} Sales+streaming figures based on certification alone.
