= Walter Hayward-Young =

British artist

- Born: 1868
- Died: 1920 (aged 51–52)
- Known for: Postcard designs

Walter Hayward-Young (1868 – 1920) was a British artist, also known as Hayward Young and Jotter Hayward-Young.

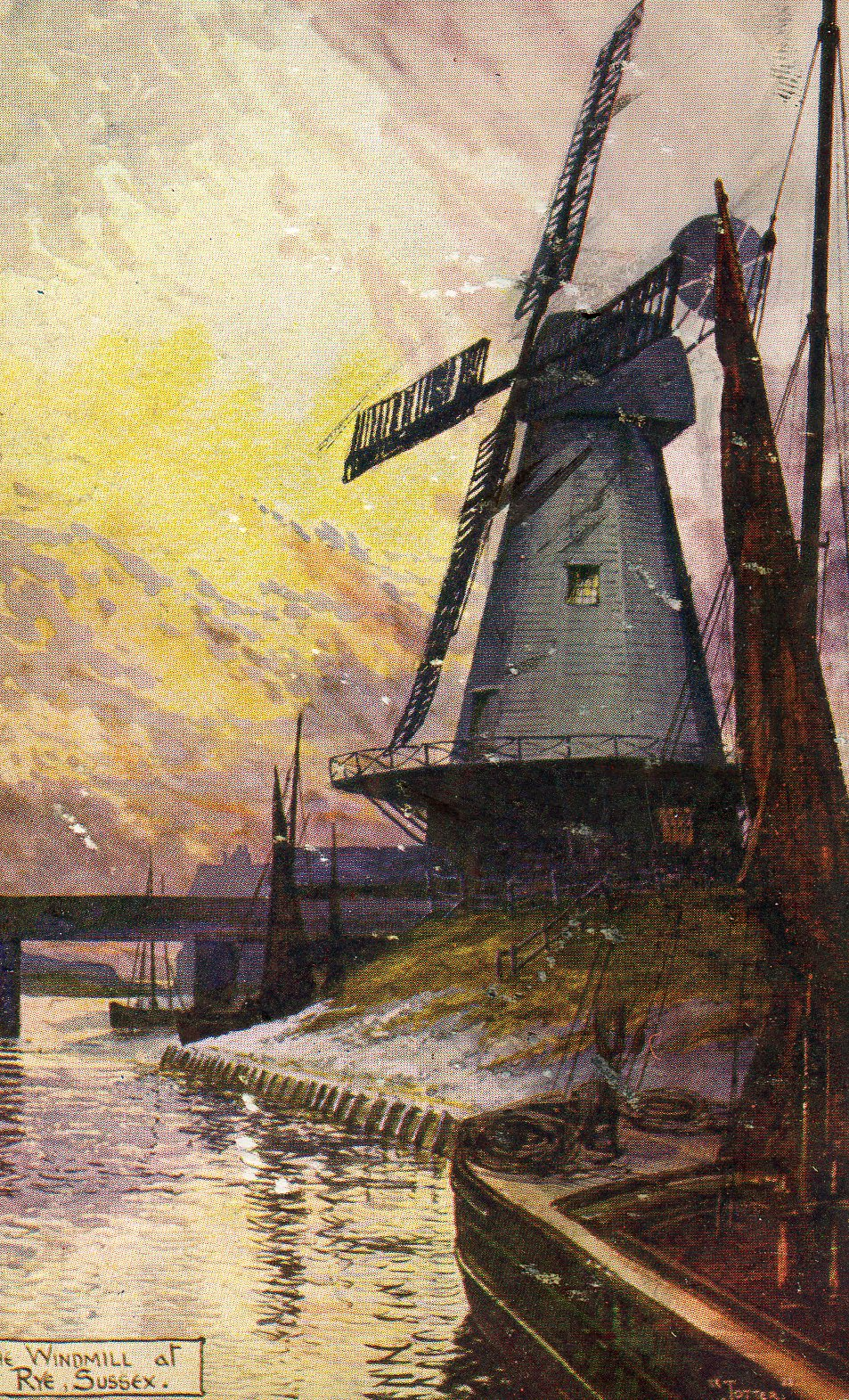
Gibbet Mill, Rye by Walter Hayward-Young

Educated at Warwick School, Hayward-Young's work, particularly his postcard designs (of which there are over 800), became renowned worldwide. He wrote a series of articles on sketching for The Girls Own Paper and Woman's Magazine which were later published as a book under the title Short Cuts to Sketching.

Hayward-Young signed many of his pieces under the pseudonym 'Jotter'.

In 1912, Hayward-Young designed posters for the London Underground, including one promoting visits to Hampton Court.

Musician Justin Hayward-Young is one of his descendants.
