= Neuroendocrine hyperplasia =

- Other names: Neuroendocrine cell hyperplasia of infancy
- Specialty: Pulmonology

Neuroendocrine hyperplasia is rare and poorly understood lung condition which is characterized by an abnormal growth of pulmonary neuroendocrine cells in the lungs. It is a non-progressive disease of the interstitial tissues of the lungs. Prior to the findings of the hyperplasia of neuroendocrine cells it was known as tachypnea of infancy, as most children outgrow the need for oxygen supplementation within two to seven years. It is characterized by tachypnea, hypoxemia, and retractions. It is typically diagnosed in infants and children younger than one year of age. There is no currently recognized treatment, infants and children are given oxygen supplementation until they outgrow the need; since neuroendocrine cells do not multiply or get larger in size while the lungs continue to grow. This allows the lung disease to have less effect on lung function with age, although they will always have the same amount of neuroendocrine cells as they were born with.

== Signs and symptoms ==
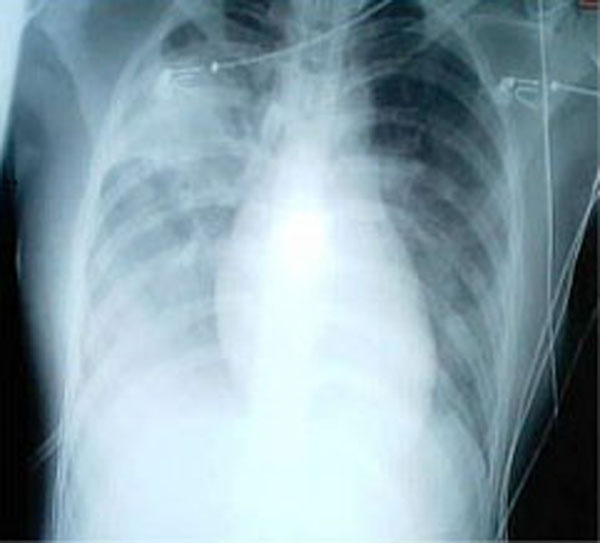
X-Ray of Chest with Pneumonia

People with this diagnosis may have no obvious symptoms, they may present with shortness of breath or wheezing. Infants and children present with symptoms of heavy breathing at a rate greater than 20 breath/min. Oxygen levels are lower due to hypoxia, and chest x-rays show signs of pneumonia. NEHI typically presents in otherwise healthy infants during the first months to year of life. Severe cases may risk permanent damage to the lungs and death from severe tachypnea.

- Tachypnea
- Hypoxemia
- retractions
- crackles (in lungs)
- exercise intolerance

== Causes ==
There is no cause for most cases of neuroendocrine hyperplasia. However, a known cause is a rapid increase of pulmonary endocrine cells in the lungs in children under the age of 2 years. An increase in pulmonary endocrine cells is usually seen in adults with a history of smoking, COPD, or cystic fibrosis. Children under the age of 2 may present with signs of interstitial lung disease and be diagnosed with NEH following severe progression.

== Mechanism ==
Neuroendocrine hyperplasia is a rare condition amongst chILD. This condition is characterized as an overgrowth of pulmonary endocrine cells in the lungs. These cells receive signals from neurons to produce hormones. With this rapid increase of PNC (pulmonary endocrine cells), this can affect the airways of children.

== Diagnosis ==
To diagnose neuroendocrine hyperplasia after a referral is made for fast breathing (tachypnea) or need for extra oxygen. There are several tests that are commonly performed to confirm the diagnosis. Chest CT gives a better look at the lungs to see signs of pneumonia. With a bronchoscopy, a scope (small camera) is passed from the mouth or nose, through the windpipe, and into the lungs to check for other causes of breathing problems. A lung biopsy may be the only way to diagnose the disease if the chest CT does not show the characteristic findings. In a biopsy, a small portion of lung tissue is removed to determine if lung disease is present.

== Treatment ==
There is no consensus on the therapy for NEHI, and management generally consists of supportive care: supplemental oxygen for chronic hypoxemia, adequate nutrition, proper immunization, avoidance of environmental pollutants, and treatment of recurrent infections . To relieve symptoms of NEH, there are not any methods yet proven effective in infants. Supportive care and adequate nutrition may be considerate in improve quality of life as NEH in most cases is not treatable.

== Prognosis ==
The long-term outcome of NEHI is generally favourable with most patients gradually improving over time, although persistent airway obstruction mimicking severe asthma and relapse with respiratory infection.

== Epidemiology ==
The incidence and prevalence of NEHI are unknown, but it is clearly rare. Available data derive from small to moderate sized case series. The original report of this disorder in 2005 included 15 cases. A study from a large referral center identified 19 cases (14 percent) from among 138 lung biopsy cases accrued over a 10-year period. Twenty-three NEH cases were included in a separate study testing chest CAT scan. The largest report to date includes 37 cases in a manuscript focusing on infant pulmonary function testing (PFT)

== Current research ==
The research being done on neuroendocrine hyperplasia consists of a criterion to distinguish its characteristics from similar cHILD cases. A recent study in November, 2020 helped identify pathologic features of NEH, and used clinical patients to support their data. Another study reviewed the various supplemental oxygen use in NEH patients. They identified factors in NEH to help in clinical course. As well as, reviewed failure to thrive patients who would have an increased use of supplemental oxygen. Other than its associations with chILD, researchers do not know much about this condition.
