= Alfie Templeman =

English musician

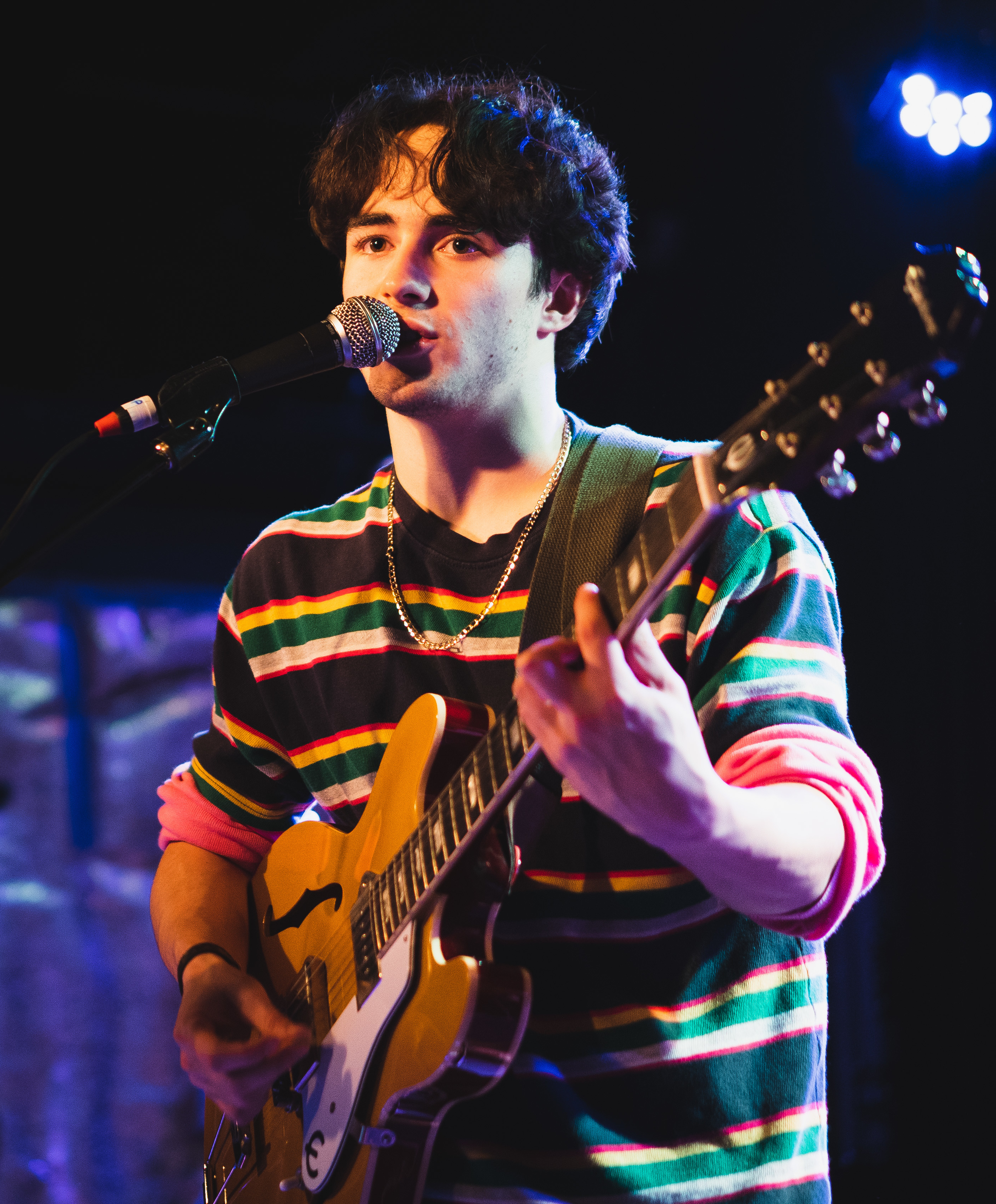
- Templeman in January 2020

Background information
- Born: Alfie George Templeman; 26 January 2003 (age 23); Carlton, Bedfordshire, England
- Genres: Indie pop; disco-pop; slacker rock; bedroom pop
- Instruments: Vocals; guitar; bass guitar; drums; synthesiser; piano; cello
- Years active: 2016–present
- Label: Chess Club, Haunted Attic
- Website: www.alfietempleman.com

Alfie George Templeman (born 26 January 2003) is an English singer-songwriter, multi-instrumentalist and producer. In 2016, he began recording and releasing demos at the age of 13. Templeman made his professional solo debut in 2018, and went on to release seven extended plays, as well as two studio albums, Mellow Moon (2022) and Radiosoul (2024).

At the start of his career, Templeman described his sound as "indie R&B", often drawing inspiration from the experiences of others, such as characters from TV shows. He then shifted to a wider and more experimental sonic palette for his 2024 album, Radiosoul.

== Early life ==
Templeman was born in Carlton, Bedfordshire. He cites the area as an influence on his music.

Templeman grew up around his father's collection of guitars. He has stated this is what "[drew him] into the world of music".

At the age of seven, he developed an interest in drums and received his first guitar at age eight. Until then, he'd taught himself how to play his father's left-handed guitars upside down. Self-taught at everything apart from drums, Templeman began recording at home and making CDs with his friends at age ten. By the time he turned 13, he had already acquired a fair understanding of music production software on his own and began working on creating full-length tracks. His mother encouraged him to sing. Templeman transitioned from producing simple instrumentals to fully-formed compositions.

== Career ==
In 2018, Templeman recorded and released his debut single "Orange Juice", followed soon after by his debut EP, Like an Animal, released in October 2018 by Chess Club Records. Templeman wrote, performed and recorded his debut EP Like an Animal in his bedroom after school. Before signing with Chess Club, Templeman would upload his music on Spotify and was noticed when he featured on their "Discover Weekly" playlist.

After completing his GCSEs, Templeman left high school in 2019 at 16 years old to pursue a full-time music career.

Following the success of his debut, Templeman released his second EP, Sunday Morning Cereal, in June 2019 and his third EP, Don't Go Wasting Time, later that same year.

In April 2019, Templeman performed at the O2 Academy Brixton supporting Sundara Karma and has also supported Sports Team on their UK tour and played the Five Day Forecast and Eurosonic Noorderslag in 2020. In January 2020, Templeman started his first mini-tour, with first performing at Headrow House in Leeds, on 17 January, before selling out his first London headline show at Colours, Hoxton. His 2020 single "Happiness in Liquid Form" was added to rotation on Australian youth broadcaster Triple J. Templeman's 2020 single "Forever Isn't Long Enough" was released on 28 September 2020, and launched with a third consecutive Annie Mac's Hottest Record in the World on BBC Radio 1. Templeman singles "Happiness in Liquid Form" and "Obvious Guy" both earned a space on the Radio 1 C List.

In an interview with Headliner Magazine in 2021, Templeman said of his single "Everybody's Gonna Love Somebody": "I'm just doing it in my room; I'm a normal bloke just making a bit of a tune. It's literally just been me messing around, really; I'm not a professional at it at all. I just know how to piece it together enough to make it not sound like a bunch of noise!"

In November 2020, he was shortlisted as a finalist for MTV Push UK & IRE 2021 for best upcoming artists.

On 3 November 2021, Templeman released the single "3D Feelings", produced by Justin Young of The Vaccines. This was followed by the release of "Broken" in 2022, alongside the announcement of his debut studio album, Mellow Moon, which was released on 27 May through Chess Club Records.

On 13 February 2024, Templeman released the track "Eyes Wide Shut", the lead single from his second studio album, Radiosoul, which was announced on 7 March and released on 7 June through Chess Club Records. The album was anticipated by four more singles: the title track, "Hello Lonely", "Beckham" and "Just a Dance" (featuring Nile Rodgers). In May of the same year, the artist performed on the New Music Stage at BBC Radio 1's Big Weekend festival in Luton.

== Personal life ==
In 2019, Templeman was hospitalized and then diagnosed with childhood interstitial lung disease. In 2021, he opened up about his experiences with depression and anxiety.

In July 2020, he co-signed an open letter to UK Minister for Women and Equalities Liz Truss, calling for a ban on all forms of LGBT+ conversion therapy.

In May 2024, Templeman was one of the over 100 acts who decided to boycott that year's edition of The Great Escape Festival in Brighton and Hove, in protest against the event's sponsor Barclays and its investments in companies supplying arms that were reportedly used by Israeli military forces in their invasion of the Gaza Strip.

Templeman has perfect pitch.

== Discography ==
=== Studio albums ===
Title	Details	Peak chart positions		
Title	Details	UK	UK Indie	SCO
Mellow Moon	Released: 27 May 2022; Label: Chess Club; Format: CD, LP, digital download, streaming	31	1	16
Radiosoul	Released: 7 June 2024; Label: Chess Club; Format: CD, LP, digital download, streaming	57	3	29

=== Mini-albums ===
Title	Details	Peak chart positions		
Title	Details	UK	UK Indie	SCO
Forever Isn't Long Enough	Released: 7 May 2021; Label: Chess Club; Format: CD, LP, digital download, streaming	86	6	16

=== Extended plays ===
List of EPs released, with release date and label shown
Title	Details	Peak chart positions	
Title	Details	UK Indie	SCO
Wonderland Dreamin'^{[a]}	Released: 1 August 2017; Label: Self-released; Format: Digital download	—	—
Dazed Days^{[a]}	Released: 25 October 2017; Label: Self-released; Format: Digital download	—	—
5th Avenue Revisited^{[a]}	Released: 2 March 2018; Label: Self-released; Format: Digital download	—	—
Like an Animal	Released: 18 October 2018; Label: Chess Club; Format: Vinyl, digital download, streaming	—	—
Sunday Morning Cereal	Released: 21 June 2019; Label: Chess Club; Formats: Vinyl, digital download, streaming	—	—
Don't Go Wasting Time	Released: 13 November 2019; Label: Chess Club; Formats: Vinyl, digital download, streaming	—	—
Happiness in Liquid Form	Released: 17 July 2020; Label: Chess Club; Formats: Vinyl, digital download, streaming	22	84
"—" denotes a recording that did not chart or was not released.

=== Singles ===
==== As lead artist ====
List of singles, with year released, chart positions and album shown
Title	Year	Peak chart positions	Album
Title	Year	BEL (FL) Tip	Album
"Orange Juice"	2018	—	Non-album single
"Stop Thinking (About Me)"	2019	—	Sunday Morning Cereal
"Sunday Morning Cereal"	2019	—	Sunday Morning Cereal
"Used to Love"	2019	—	Don't Go Wasting Time
"Don't Go Wasting Time"	2019	—	Don't Go Wasting Time
"Happiness in Liquid Form"	2020	41	Happiness in Liquid Form
"My Best Friend" (featuring Coach Party)	2020	—	Happiness in Liquid Form
"Obvious Guy"	2020	39	Happiness in Liquid Form
"Things I Thought Were Mine"	2020	—	Happiness in Liquid Form
"Forever Isn't Long Enough"	2020	—	Forever Isn't Long Enough
"Shady"	2020	—	Forever Isn't Long Enough
"Everybody's Gonna Love Somebody"	2021	—	Forever Isn't Long Enough
"One More Day" (featuring April)	2021	—	Forever Isn't Long Enough
"3D Feelings"	2021	—	Mellow Moon
"Broken"	2022	—	Mellow Moon
"Leaving Today"	2022	—	Mellow Moon
"Colour Me Blue"	2022	—	Mellow Moon
"No One Does It Better Than You" (with Bob Junior)	2023	—	Non-album single
"Eyes Wide Shut"	2024	—	Radiosoul
"Radiosoul"	2024	—	Radiosoul
"Hello Lonely"	2024	—	Radiosoul
"Dirty Laundry"	2024	—	Non-album single
"—" denotes a recording that did not chart or was not released.

==== As a featured artist ====
Title	Year	Album
"You Love Me in My Dreams" (Ariel Days featuring Alfie Templeman)	2018	Ariel Days
"Close Yr Eyes" (carpetgarden featuring Alfie Templeman)	2018	Non-album singles
"Saturday" (Sully featuring Alfie Templeman)	2018	Non-album singles
"Christmas Time for Many Minds" (Jebb and the Riots featuring Alfie Templeman)	2018	Stories of Christmas
"Hey" (Oscar Lang featuring Alfie Templeman)	2019	Bops Etc.
"Lemonade" (Circa Waves featuring Alfie Templeman)	2020	Non-album singles
"Dizzy" (chloe moriondo featuring Thomas Headon & Alfie Templeman)	2021	Non-album singles

== Festival appearances ==
Festival	Location	Date
Field Day	London, UK	8 June 2019
Truck Festival	Oxfordshire, UK	26–28 July 2019
Reading Festival	Reading, UK	24 August 2019
Leeds Festival	Leeds, UK	25 August 2019
Reeperbahn Festival	Hamburg, Germany	19 September 2019
Neighborhood Festival	Manchester, UK	12 October 2019
Mirrors Festival	London, UK	2 November 2019
Reading Festival	Reading, UK	28 August 2021
Leeds Festival	Leeds, UK	29 August 2021
Corona Capital 2021	Mexico City	20 November 2021
Radio 1's Big Weekend	Coventry, UK	29 May 2022
Glastonbury Festival	Somerset, UK	24 June 2022
Depot in the Castle	Cardiff, UK	9 July 2022
Truck Festival	Oxford, UK	24 July 2022
Sziget Festival	Budapest, Hungary	12 August 2022
Victorious Festival	Portsmouth, UK	28 August 2022
Asagiri Jam	Asagiri, Japan	9 October 2022
Radio 1's Big Weekend	Luton, UK	25 May 2024

Truck Festival Oxford, UK 25 July 2025

== Awards and nominations ==
List of awards and nominations, with organisation, award, nominated work, and result shown
Year	Organization	Award	Work	Result	Ref.
2019	NME	The NME 100	Himself	Included	
2020	DIY	Class of 2020	Himself	Included	
2020	MTV	MTV Push UK & Ireland	Himself	Nominated	
2020	BBC	Sound of 2021	Himself	Longlisted	
2020	Vevo	Vevo Dscvr 2021	Himself	Shortlisted	

== Notes ==
^a All releases prior to Orange Juice were removed from streaming platforms at an unknown date, presumably shortly before or after its release. However, these EPs were subsequently re-uploaded to Bandcamp in 2020, and therefore they are regarded as official releases.
