= Bad Mood (The Vaccines song) =

Single by the Vaccines

from the album Come of Age
- B-side: "Living Out Your Dreams Backwards"
- Released: 17 March 2013
- Recorded: 2012
- Genre: Indie rock, blues rock
- Length: 3:05
- Label: Columbia Records
- Songwriter(s): The Vaccines

The Vaccines singles chronology
"I Always Knew" (2012)	"Bad Mood" (2013)	"Handsome" (2015)

"Bad Mood" is a song from English indie rock band the Vaccines. The track was released in the United Kingdom on 17 March 2013 as the fourth and final single from the band's second studio album, Come of Age (2012).

== Track listing ==
Digital download
No.	Title	Length
1.	"Bad Mood"	3:05
2.	"Living Out Your Dreams Backwards"	2:59
3.	"Bad Mood" (Demo)	4:01
4.	"Bad Mood" (Live in Brighton)	2:25

== Charts ==
Chart (2011)	Peak position
Belgium (Ultratip Bubbling Under Flanders)	51

== Release history ==
Region	Date	Format
United Kingdom	17 March 2013	Digital download
