= Handsome (song) =

Single by the Vaccines

from the album English Graffiti
- Released: 8 March 2015
- Recorded: 2014
- Length: 2:10
- Label: Columbia Records
- Songwriters: The Vaccines, Cole MGN
- Producers: The Vaccines, David Fridmann, Cole MGN

The Vaccines singles chronology
"Bad Mood" (2013)	"Handsome" (2015)	"Dream Lover" (2015)

Music video
- "Handsome" on YouTube

"Handsome" is a song from English indie rock band the Vaccines. The track was released in the United Kingdom on 8 March 2015 as the lead single from the band's third studio album, English Graffiti (2015). The track received its premiere on BBC Radio 1 when it featured as Zane Lowe's Hottest Record in the World on 19 January. "Handsome" was written by Young, Cowan, Árnason and Robertson and produced by the band alongside David Fridmann and Cole MGN.

== Track listing ==
Digital download
No.	Title	Length
1.	"Handsome"	2:10
2.	"Handsome Reimagined" (Dave Fridmann Edit)	2:23

== Charts ==
Chart (2015)	Peak position
Belgium (Ultratip Bubbling Under Flanders)	61
UK Singles (OCC)	74

== Release history ==
Region	Date	Format
United Kingdom	8 March 2015	Digital download
