= Pick-Up Full of Pink Carnations =

Studio album by the Vaccines
- Released: 12 January 2024
- Recorded: 2023
- Studio: Andrew Wells' house (Los Angeles)
- Genre: Indie Rock
- Length: 31:31
- Labels: Thirty Tigers; Super Easy
- Producer: Andrew Wells

The Vaccines chronology
Back in Love City (2021)	Pick-Up Full of Pink Carnations (2024)

Singles from Pick-Up Full of Pink Carnations
- 1. "Heartbreak Kid" Released: 20 September 2023; 2. "Sometimes, I Swear" Released: 11 October 2023; 3. "Lunar Eclipse" Released: 17 November 2023; 4. "Love to Walk Away" Released: 8 December 2023

Pick-Up Full of Pink Carnations is the sixth studio album by English indie rock band the Vaccines. It was released on 12 January 2024 through Thirty Tigers and Super Easy. It marks the first studio album following the departure of guitarist Freddie Cowan.

== Background ==
The album title Pick-Up Full of Pink Carnations was inspired by the lyrics to "American Pie" (1971) by Don McLean. According to frontman Justin Young, he was living in Los Angeles when writing the record and could relate to several sentiments expressed by McLean on the song. His "understanding of what the real West Coast of America was" after largely growing up on American pop culture has died. After "various" of his relationships came to an end, Young determined that the title should be about "the loss of dreams".

Ahead of the creative process, Young explained that the band knew they were "ready to make another record" but were unsure of how it should "sound and feel". The first day in the studio also saw the creation of the fourth single "Love to Walk Away" which would set the tone for subsequent sessions. He described the song as the sonic and thematic "direction" for the album. The Vaccines teamed up with producer Andrew Wells and recorded the album in his home studio in the Hollywood Hills, a place Young thought was a "very inspiring, exciting place to be every day". The project came out "more cohesive than most [of our] records in terms of songs, but sound as well", feeling like they achieved what they "set out to achieve".

== Promotion ==
Almost immediately after the album's release, the band embarked on a 25 date tour across the UK and Europe, starting on 17 January 2024 in Amsterdam.

Following this they embarked on a 16-date North American tour with The Kooks, starting on 29 February 2024 in Atlanta.

The band spent the remainder of 2024 and 2025 touring Europe, Australia, North America, Asia and Latin America including a performance at Glastonbury Festival and shows supporting Queens Of The Stone Age and Kings Of Leon.

== Critical reception ==
Professional ratings
Aggregate scores
Source	Rating
Metacritic	70/100
Review scores
Source	Rating
DIY	3.5/5 stars
The Guardian	3/5 stars
NME	3/5 stars
The Skinny	4/5 stars
The Telegraph	4/5 stars
Uncut	3.5/5 stars

At Metacritic, which assigns a normalized rating out of 100 to reviews from professional critics, the album received an average score of 70 based on seven reviews, indicating "generally favorable" reception. Tara Hepburn of The Skinny thought there was "an attractive simplicity to this record", calling it their "most straightforward" album to date. Hepburn opined that the project was "an album full of singles", highlighting the "catchy feelings-forward songs with football chant-worthy choruses". In another positive review, the staff at Uncut found that Pick-Up Full of Pink Carnations sees the Vaccines "at their terse, nervy best".

Writing for The Telegraph, Neil McCormick was more critical of the album, arguing that "everything" about them "is second-hand yet somehow muddled".

== Track listing ==
Pick-Up Full of Pink Carnations track listing
No.	Title	Writer(s)	Length
1.	"Sometimes, I Swear"	Justin Young; Árni Árnason; Timothy Lanham; Yoann Intonti	3:38
2.	"Heartbreak Kid"	Young; Árnason; Lanham; Intonti; Andrew Wells; Rory Wynne Andrew	3:00
3.	"Lunar Eclipse"	Young; Árnason; Lanham; Intonti; Wells	2:56
4.	"Discount De Kooning (Last One Standing)"	Young; Árnason; Lanham; Intonti; Henry Camamile; Ben Garrett	3:49
5.	"Primitive Man"	Young; Árnason; Lanham; Intonti; Will Bloomfield	3:10
6.	"Sunkissed"	Young; Árnason; Lanham; Intonti; Christian Medice	3:01
7.	"Another Nightmare"	Young; Árnason; Lanham; Intonti; Joe Janiak	3:05
8.	"Love to Walk Away"	Young; Árnason; Lanham; Intonti; Wells; Anthony Rossomando	2:07
9.	"The Dreamer"	Young; Árnason; Lanham; Intonti; Medice	3:39
10.	"Anonymous in Los Feliz"	Young; Árnason; Lanham; Intonti; Austin Ward	3:06
Total length:			31:31

Deluxe Digital
No.	Title	Writer(s)	Length
11.	"Ferrari of Safaris"	Young; Árnason; Lanham; Intonti; Daniel Ledinsky	3:05
12.	"Fridays" (demo)	Young; Árnason; Lanham; Intonti	2:57
13.	"Fridays" (demo)	Young; Árnason; Lanham; Intonti	3:40
Total length:			41:07

== Personnel ==
The Vaccines

- Justin Young – vocals, guitars
- Yoann Intonti – drums
- Árni Árnason – bass
- Timothy Lanham – guitars, keyboards

Additional personnel

- Andrew Wells – producer
- Matt Boerum – engineering
- Alan JS Han – mixing

== Charts ==
Chart performance for Pick-Up Full of Pink Carnations
Chart (2024)	Peak position
Scottish Albums (Official Charts)	1
UK Albums (Official Charts)	3
