= Alan Pownall =

- Also known as: Alan Power
- Born: Stephen Alan Fletcher Pownall; 30 December 1984 (age 41); United Kingdom
- Occupations: Singer, songwriter
- Instrument: Vocals
- Formerly of: Pale
- Spouse: Gabriella Wilde (m. 2014)

Stephen Alan Fletcher Pownall (born 30 December 1984) is an English singer-songwriter and the husband of actress Gabriella Wilde.

== Music ==
The son of Orlando Pownall, QC, he grew up in Richmond-upon-Thames and was educated at Windlesham House School, Marlborough College and Shiplake College. Originally interested in fashion, he worked for French designer Roland Mouret for two years, where he was advised to study in Milan. He went on to study fashion design but dropped out a year later in 2006 to pursue a music career in London.

After meeting Adele at one of her early gigs, he told her that he was making music and she should look it up. To his surprise, he was contacted via his MySpace profile and asked to support her on her first British tour. As he only had a four-song set, he wrote a lot of his material whilst on tour. He also toured with Paloma Faith, Lissie, Marina and the Diamonds, Noah and the Whale and Florence and the Machine.

He shared a flat in London with fellow singer/songwriter Jay Jay Pistolet (who would go on to become the front man of The Vaccines). He later moved in with Marcus Mumford and Winston Marshall from Mumford and Sons, who he supposedly introduced to Ted Dwane.

In one interview he claims to be "all but deaf in right ear."

Pownall's debut EP was released on 5 April 2010 through Mercury Records and his album True Love Stories was released on 25 June 2010. They parted company shortly after the release in late 2010, with Pownall taking a two and a half year break from music.

Pownall and formed the electro-pop duo Pale in late 2012, with Pownall as the singer. Pale has supported The Vaccines and Sky Ferreira on tour. They worked with Jas Shaw of Simian Mobile Disco to produce their first two singles, released through the independent label 37 Adventures. As of November 2017, their Facebook and SoundCloud pages show that Pale has been dormant since releasing an EP, The Comeback, in 2014.

== Personal life ==
On 13 September 2014, Pownall married actress Gabriella Wilde. The couple's first son, Sasha Blue Pownall, was born on 3 February 2014. In 2016, Wilde gave birth to their second son, Shiloh Silva Pownall. Gabriella has since given birth to their third son Skye in 2019.

== Discography ==
Professional ratings
Review scores
Source	Rating
Allmusic	3/5 stars
Clash	5/10 stars
The Guardian	3/5 stars
MusicOMH	3/5 stars

=== Studio album ===
Title	Album details
True Love Stories	Released: 2010; Label: Mercury; Format: CD, digital download
