= Come of Age =

Studio album by the Vaccines
- Released: 3 September 2012
- Studios: ICP (Brussels, Belgium)
- Genres: Indie rock; garage rock; surf rock; power pop; post punk revival
- Length: 39:35
- Label: Columbia
- Producer: Ethan Johns

The Vaccines chronology
What Did You Expect from The Vaccines? (2011)	Come of Age (2012)	Melody Calling (2013)

Singles from Come of Age
- 1. "No Hope" Released: 6 July 2012; 2. "Teenage Icon" Released: 2 September 2012; 3. "I Always Knew" Released: 18 November 2012; 4. "Bad Mood" Released: 17 March 2013

Professional ratings
Review scores
Source	Rating
The Upcoming	4/5 stars
NME	8/10
Clash	8/10
Uncut	7/10
The Guardian	3/5 stars
The Daily Telegraph	4/5 stars
AltSounds	4/5 stars
Drowned in Sound	7/10
Digital Spy	4/5 stars
Platform	8/10
Consequence of Sound	3.5/5 stars
BBC	(positive)
PopMatters	7/10
Sputnikmusic	3.5/5 stars
Evening Standard	4/5 stars
AllMusic	3/5 stars

Come of Age (also alternatively titled The Vaccines Come of Age) is the second studio album by English indie rock band the Vaccines, which was released on 3 September 2012. It follows their debut album What Did You Expect from The Vaccines?, released the previous year. It was produced by Ethan Johns and reached number one in the UK.

== Album art ==
The image on the front cover of the album is a photo of four androgynous teenage girls, each representing a different member of the band.

== Influences ==
Lead singer and songwriter Justin Young cites No Other by Gene Clark, #1 Record by Big Star and "Spanish Bombs" by the Clash as his major inspirations during the writing of this album.

== Track listing ==
All lyrics written by Justin Young, all music composed by the Vaccines.

No.	Title	Length
1.	"No Hope"	4:10
2.	"I Always Knew"	3:34
3.	"Teenage Icon"	3:05
4.	"All in Vain"	3:52
5.	"Ghost Town"	2:21
6.	"Aftershave Ocean"	4:10
7.	"Weirdo"	4:49
8.	"Bad Mood"	3:06
9.	"Change of Heart Pt. 2"	2:18
10.	"I Wish I Was a Girl"	2:53
11.	"Lonely World"	5:02

Japanese Bonus Tracks
No.	Title	Length
12.	"Blow Your Mind"	2:10
13.	"Panic Attack"	2:11

Deluxe Edition Bonus Tracks
No.	Title	Length
12.	"Runaway" (track 14 on Japanese Deluxe Edition)	2:49
13.	"Possessive" (track 15 on Japanese Deluxe Edition)	3:42
14.	"Misbehaviour" (track 16 on Japanese Deluxe Edition)	2:58

Deluxe Edition Live at Brighton Bonus CD
No.	Title	Length
1.	"No Hope"	4:07
2.	"Wreckin' Bar (Ra Ra Ra)"	1:43
3.	"Tiger Blood"	2:28
4.	"A Lack of Understanding"	3:08
5.	"Wetsuit"	4:24
6.	"Teenage Icon"	3:15
7.	"Under Your Thumb"	2:27
8.	"Post Break Up Sex"	2:55
9.	"All in White"	4:42
10.	"Wolf Pack"	2:50
11.	"Weirdo"	5:01
12.	"Blow It Up"	2:40
13.	"Bad Mood"	3:21
14.	"If You Wanna"	3:27
15.	"Family Friend"	8:56
16.	"Why Should I Love You?"	3:48
17.	"Norgaard"	2:32

== Charts ==
=== Weekly charts ===
Chart (2012)	Peak position
Australian Albums (ARIA)	43
Austrian Albums (Ö3 Austria)	72
Belgian Albums (Ultratop Flanders)	14
Belgian Albums (Ultratop Wallonia)	52
Dutch Albums (Album Top 100)	70
French Albums (SNEP)	60
German Albums (Offizielle Top 100)	86
Irish Albums (IRMA)	8
Italian Albums (FIMI)	93
Scottish Albums (Official Charts)	1
Spanish Albums (Promusicae)	50
Swedish Albums (Sverigetopplistan)	36
Swiss Albums (Schweizer Hitparade)	42
UK Albums (Official Charts)	1

=== Year-end charts ===
Chart (2012)	Position
UK Albums (OCC)	80

== Certifications ==
Region	Certification	Certified units/sales
United Kingdom (BPI)	Platinum	300,000^{‡}
^{‡} Sales+streaming figures based on certification alone.

== Personnel ==
- Justin Young – vocals, rhythm guitar
- Freddie Cowan – lead guitar, backing vocals
- Arni Arnason – bass guitar, backing vocals
- Pete Robertson – drums, backing vocals

Additional musicians

- Ethan Johns – percussion (tracks 2, 4, 6, 8, 11), acoustic guitar (tracks 2, 4)
