= Melody Calling =

EP by The Vaccines
- Released: 11 August 2013
- Studio: Eldorado Studios, Burbank, California
- Length: 12:27
- Label: Columbia
- Producer: John Hill; Rich Costey

The Vaccines chronology
Come of Age (2012)	Melody Calling (2013)	English Graffiti (2015)

Melody Calling ratings
Review scores
Source	Rating
The Line of Best Fit	6.5/10

Melody Calling is the debut EP by British indie rock band The Vaccines, that follows the release of their second studio album Come of Age. The EP was released on Columbia Records on 11 August 2013 in the UK and 12 August worldwide. The EP features three new tracks and a remixed version of the second track "Do You Want a Man?", remixed by producers John Hill and Rich Costey. The title track was released on the internet on 25 June through the band's Facebook page, along with other tracks during the following period preceding the physical release.

== Track listing ==
No.	Title	Length
1.	"Melody Calling"	3:00
2.	"Do You Want a Man?"	2:46
3.	"Everybody's Gonna Let You Down"	4:15
4.	"Do You Want a Man? (John Hill + Rich Costey remix)"	2:26
Total length:		12:27

== Charts ==
Chart (2013)	Peak position
Belgium (Ultratip Bubbling Under Flanders)	21
UK Albums Chart	62
