= All My Friends Are Falling in Love =

"All My Friends Are Falling In Love"

Single by the Vaccines
- Released: 13 November 2018
- Genre: Indie rock
- Length: 3:30
- Label: Columbia
- Songwriters: The Vaccines, Cole MGN
- Producer: Daniel Ledinsky

The Vaccines singles chronology
"Your Love Is My Favourite Band" (2018)	"All My Friends Are Falling In Love" (2018)	"Headphones Baby" (2021)

Music video
- "All My Friends Are Falling In Love" on YouTube

"All My Friends Are Falling In Love" is a song from English indie rock band the Vaccines. The track was released as a stand-alone single by Columbia Records on 13 November 2018. The song premiered on BBC Radio 1 when it featured as Annie Mac's Hottest Record in the World.

== Music video ==
The music video for the song premiered on 13 November 2018. It features lead singer Justin Young singing along to the song in a club full of couples as the lyrics are shown. The other band members also appear throughout the video.

== Charts ==
Chart (2019)	Peak position
Belgium (Ultratip Bubbling Under Flanders)	24
Belgium (Ultratip Bubbling Under Wallonia)	40

== Certifications ==
Region	Certification	Certified units/sales
United Kingdom (BPI)	Silver	200,000^{‡}
^{‡} Sales+streaming figures based on certification alone.
