= Combat Sports (album) =

Studio album by The Vaccines
- Released: 30 March 2018
- Recorded: 2017–2018
- Genres: Indie rock; garage rock
- Length: 33:00
- Label: Columbia
- Producer: Ross Orton

The Vaccines chronology
English Graffiti (2015)	Combat Sports (2018)	Back In Love City (2021)

Singles from Combat Sports
- 1. "I Can't Quit" Released: 3 January 2018; 2. "Nightclub" Released: 23 January 2018; 3. "Put It on a T-Shirt" Released: 2 March 2018; 4. "Surfing in the Sky" Released: 16 March 2018; 5. "Your Love Is My Favourite Band" Released: 23 March 2018

Combat Sports is the fourth studio album by English indie rock band, The Vaccines. The album was released on 30 March 2018 through Columbia Records. It is the first album recorded with keyboardist Timothy Lanham and drummer Yoann Intonti, both of whom had originally joined the band as touring musicians during the English Graffiti album cycle, with Lanham added from the campaign's inception, while Intonti—who was still a member of Spector at the time—replaced the departed Pete Robertson in the last phase of the campaign. Both became involved in the making of Combat Sports at the midway point before being promoted to full members of the band with Lanham pictured wearing a T-shirt with the album title featured on the front cover, an idea inspired by the album's opening track, "Put It on a T-Shirt". The overall cover art concept is an homage to the band's debut album, albeit "more of an abrasive version of that". The album title itself came out in the immediate aftermath of a fight that broke out in the studio between Young and Cowan towards the end of making the album.

It charted at number four on the UK Albums Chart upon release.

== Writing and recording ==
Shortly after the release of English Graffiti - which was a deliberate departure from their previous two albums - The Vaccines discovered only a few songs from it translated well when performed live. In early 2016, The Vaccines reconvened at bassist Árni Árnason's studio in London to figure out their next move, without much success. Though Robertson's departure in mid-2016 made the band consider calling it a day, it also forced them to rediscover their identity. The remaining trio contemplated various directions of continuing as a band, including resorting to drum programming.

Meanwhile, the presence of touring musicians Lanham and Intonti helped improve relations within the band, with Lanham in particular acting as a mediator between band members, helping Young on new demos and arranging song parts with everyone. Due to their involvement during the writing process, Lanham and Intonti were promoted to full members.

By late 2016, Young mentioned that The Vaccines were already "far along" in the writing process, with new material that "builds on the musicality of English Graffiti" but with "a lot more of spirit and energy from What Did You Expect from The Vaccines?" Young also added that the songs felt more like a band again, due to The Vaccines playing together in the studio every day.

In January 2017, it was reported that The Vaccines' fourth album would contain songs "like polished '70s and '80s rock: Big Star, Todd Rundgren, Guided by Voices – that kind of stuff. Very smooth, like a super FM radio sound," stated Young. "Someone to Lose", "Out on the Street", and "Young American" were among the songs considered for the album, with the band looking for "a polished pop producer" to handle the recording sessions that were scheduled to take place in February. The band recorded two songs in initial sessions with Patrick Wimberly as producer; however, they felt that the results lacked identity. After meeting several other potential producers who were also confused with the direction the band wished to take, they eventually worked with Ross Orton, who "essentially banned" the band from listening to music and urged them to reference themselves. After initial reluctance to work with Orton, the band realized that they needed his "brutal honesty." Most of the songs originally planned for the album were also scrapped and new ones were written.

Young cites the death of Leonard Cohen as "a watershed moment," because it made him listen to Cohen's music and drive himself to write better lyrics. Previously, Young had stated that this album's lyrics would be about "sex and love, and love lost," after he realised that "it's all I care about."

== Critical reception ==
Professional ratings
Aggregate scores
Source	Rating
Metacritic	75/100
Review scores
Source	Rating
The A.V. Club	B+
The Guardian	4/5 stars
The Independent	4/5 stars
The Line of Best Fit	9/10
NME	4/5 stars
Paste	7.9/10

Combat Sports received positive reviews from critics, with The Line of Best Fit describing it as a "brash, attention-grabbing record". The Guardian called Combat Sports "top drawer garage rock" and complimented Young's lyrical strengths.

== Track listing ==
All lyrics are written by Justin Young; all music is composed by The Vaccines unless otherwise stated.

No.	Title	Writer(s)	Length
1.	"Put It on a T-Shirt"		3:51
2.	"I Can't Quit"	The Vaccines; Cole M. Greif-Neill	2:42
3.	"Your Love Is My Favourite Band"	The Vaccines; Will Bloomfield	3:09
4.	"Surfing in the Sky"		2:31
5.	"Maybe (Luck of the Draw)"	The Vaccines; Greif-Neill	3:49
6.	"Young American"		2:01
7.	"Nightclub"	The Vaccines; Pete Robertson	2:54
8.	"Out on the Street"	The Vaccines; Greif-Neill	2:43
9.	"Take It Easy"		2:58
10.	"Someone to Lose"		3:07
11.	"Rolling Stones"		3:09
12.	"Berlin" (Japanese bonus track)		3:43

== Personnel ==
The Vaccines

- Árni Árnason – bass guitar
- Freddie Cowan – lead guitar, background vocals
- Yoann Intonti – drums, percussion
- Timothy Lanham – keyboards, additional guitar
- Justin Young – vocals, rhythm guitar

Additional contributors

- Ross Orton – production
- Dick Beetham – mastering
- Rich Costey – mixing (tracks 1–3, 5)
- Nicolas Fournier – mixing (tracks 4, 6–11)
- Dave Kuratsu – engineering (all tracks), keyboards (1, 3), piano (2), synthesizer (5)
- Martin Cooke – engineering assistance (tracks 1, 3)
- Nicolas Fournier – engineering assistance (tracks 1, 3)

== Charts ==
Chart (2018)	Peak position
Belgian Albums (Ultratop Flanders)	44
Belgian Albums (Ultratop Wallonia)	89
Irish Albums (IRMA)	74
Portuguese Albums (AFP)	35
Scottish Albums (Official Charts)	4
Spanish Albums (Promusicae)	83
Swiss Albums (Schweizer Hitparade)	82
UK Albums (Official Charts)	4
