= Back in Love City =

2021 studio album by the rock band The Vaccines

Studio album by the Vaccines
- Released: 10 September 2021
- Recorded: 2020
- Studio: Sonic Ranch
- Length: 45:44
- Labels: AWAL; Sony
- Producers: Fryars; Daniel Ledinsky

The Vaccines chronology
Combat Sports (2018)	Back in Love City (2021)	Pick-Up Full of Pink Carnations (2024)

Singles from Back in Love City
- 1. "Headphones Baby" Released: 14 May 2021; 2. "Back in Love City" Released: 25 June 2021; 3. "Alone Star" Released: 6 August 2021; 4. "El Paso" Released: 27 August 2021; 5. "Jump Off the Top" Released: 8 September 2021

Back in Love City is the fifth studio album by English indie rock band the Vaccines. It is the first Vaccines album to involve keyboardist Timothy Lanham and drummer Yoann Intonti from the start, with the pair having officially joined the band midway through the making of previous album Combat Sports.

The album was released on 10 September 2021 through AWAL via Sony Music. Five singles, "Headphones Baby", the title track, "Alone Star", "El Paso" and "Jump Off the Top" were released ahead of the album.

== Track listing ==
Back in Love City track listing
No.	Title	Writer(s)	Length
1.	"Back in Love City"	Justin Hayward-Young; Freddie Cowan; Árni Arnason; Timothy Lanham; Yoann Intonti; Will Bloomfield	3:33
2.	"Alone Star"	Young; Cowan; Arnason; Lanham; Intonti; Cole Marsden Greif-Neill; Daniel Ledinsky	3:16
3.	"Headphones Baby"	Young; Cowan; Arnason; Lanham; Intonti; Greif-Neill; Ben Garrett	3:18
4.	"Wanderlust"	Young; Cowan; Arnason; Lanham; Intonti; Bloomfield	3:34
5.	"Paranormal Romance"	Young; Cowan; Arnason; Lanham; Intonti; Max Wolfgang	3:31
6.	"El Paso"	Young; Cowan; Arnason; Lanham; Intonti; Ledinsky; Ian Dewane	3:39
7.	"Jump Off the Top"	Young; Cowan; Arnason; Lanham; Intonti; Greif-Neill	2:45
8.	"XCT"	Young; Cowan; Arnason; Lanham; Intonti; Greif-Neill	2:53
9.	"Bandit"	Young; Cowan; Arnason; Lanham; Intonti; Bloomfield	2:58
10.	"Peoples' Republic of Desire"	Young; Cowan; Arnason; Lanham; Intonti; Ledinsky; Joel Sjoo; Sammy Witte	3:58
11.	"Savage"	Young; Cowan; Arnason; Lanham; Intonti; Greif-Neill; Alan Dale Boyd	4:00
12.	"Heart Land"	Young; Cowan; Arnason; Lanham; Intonti; Greif-Neill; Ledinsky; Patrik Berger	4:07
13.	"Pink Water Pistols"	Young; Cowan; Arnason; Lanham; Intonti; Bloomfield; Boyd	4:12

== Charts ==
Chart performance for Back in Love City
Chart (2021)	Peak position
Belgian Albums (Ultratop Flanders)	173
Scottish Albums (Official Charts)	8
UK Albums (Official Charts)	5
UK Independent Albums (Official Charts)	3
