= Childhood interstitial lung disease =

Family of rare chronic and complex disorders that affect the lungs of children

childhood interstitial lung disease
- Other names: ChILD
- Specialty: Pulmonology

Childhood interstitial lung disease, sometimes abbreviated as ChILD, is a family of rare chronic and complex disorders that affect the lungs of children. In the lungs, these disorders affect the interstitium, which is the space around the alveoli. The alveoli are the air sacs of the lungs. For these disorders, the alveoli are typically impaired by inflammatory and fibrotic changes which can lead to dyspnea, diffuse infiltrates on chest radiographs, and abnormal pulmonary function tests.

Not all types of interstitial lung disease that occur in adults occur also in children, and vice versa. The group of disorders is heterogenous, and there are different definitions of what exactly should be classed as a ChILD disorder. Furthermore, the significant heterogeneity of these illnesses is reflected in the vast variation in symptoms and disease severity among children with ChILD, which makes early detection more difficult and causes delays in diagnosis.

Childhood interstitial lung disease is a serious condition, with high morbidity and mortality. People with ChILD are at a higher risk of developing pulmonary hypertension, and development of pulmonary hypertension is associated with poor survival rates.

== Classification ==
Many conditions are included in this group of diseases. They have been categorized into three groups:

- disorders of infancy, including lung problems caused by developmental disorders, growth abnormalities, and surfactant-related disorders;
- other categories that aren't specific to infancy, such as problems related to infections and immune disorders; and
- unclassifiable disorders

== Diagnosis ==
Obtaining images of sufficient quality is more difficult than in adults. Imaging may or may not be sufficient for diagnosis.

Diagnostic methods include echocardiography, computed tomography, pulmonary function testing, bronchoscopy, genetic testing and biopsy.

== Treatment ==
Although there is no cure for ChILD, common treatments include oxygen therapy, bronchodilators, extra nutrition, and corticosteroid medications. In severe ChILD cases, a lung transplant may prove effective.
