= Justin Young (singer, born 1987) =

British musician

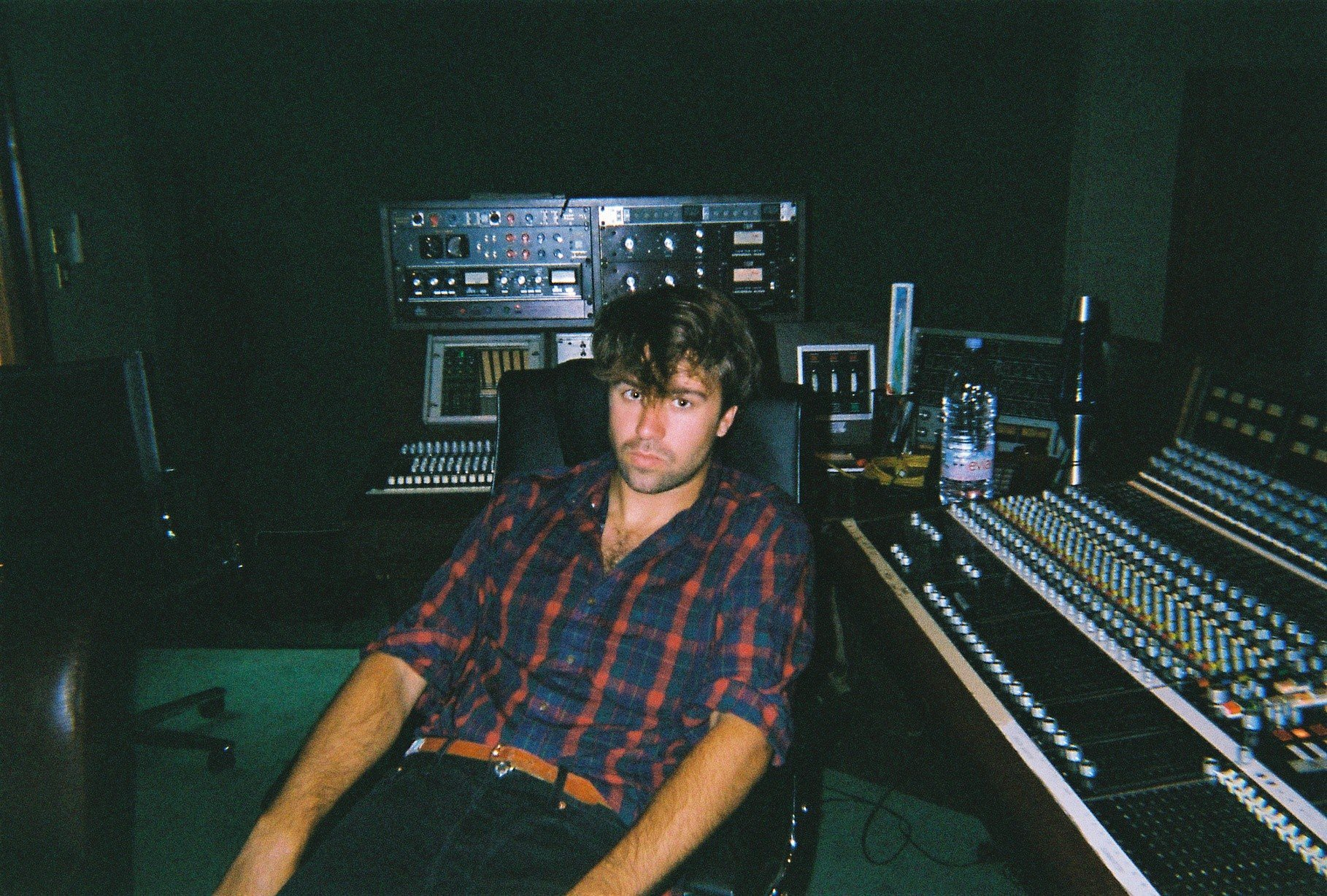
- Justin Young at RAK Studios, London

Background information
- Born: Justin James Hayward-Young; 2 May 1987 (age 39); Southampton, Hampshire, England
- Genres: Rock and roll, indie rock, folk, pop
- Occupations: Singer, musician, songwriter
- Instruments: Vocals, guitar, piano
- Years active: 2003–present
- Labels: Chess Club Records, Stiff, Columbia, Marshall Teller Records, O Genesis Records, Luaka Bop, Thirty Tigers

Justin James Hayward-Young (born 2 May 1987) is an English musician who is the lead singer and guitarist of indie rock band The Vaccines.

== Early life ==
Young was born in Hampshire, England, and grew up in the New Forest. He attended King Edward VI School, Southampton from 1998 to 2003 and Brockenhurst College from 2003 to 2005. He is a great-grandson of the prolific English painter and artist Walter Hayward-Young, who was commonly known as "Jotter". The son of a film-maker, he grew up in a "musical household" and began playing music by borrowing his father's guitars.

In June 2010, Young graduated from King's College London with a degree in History.

== Career ==
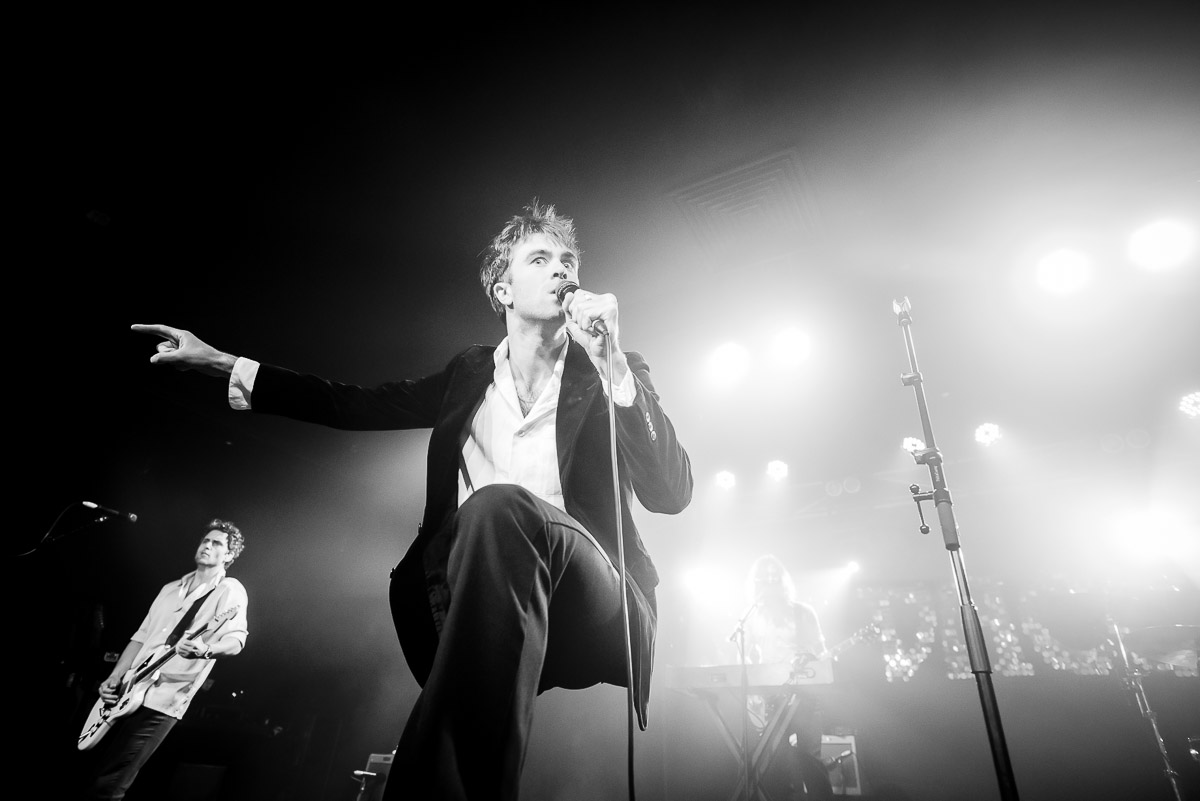
Young in 2019

During his early teens Young played in various bands, including an alt-country band called The Eldora Parade and a hardcore punk band called Fashion Police Brutality.

Arriving in London for University, Young began playing solo and performed regularly under the stage name Jay Jay Pistolet, appearing on bills with Florence & The Machine, Kid Harpoon and Frank Turner. Young is mentioned by name in two of Frank Turner's songs: "Justin is the last of the great romantic poets, And he's the only one among us who is ever going to make it" (I Knew Prufrock Before He Got Famous, 2008), "And Justin left Southampton and got famous like I said" (The Resurrectionists, 2022).

As Jay Jay Pistolet, Young released a single entitled "We Are Free" with Chess Club Records in 2007 and an EP called Happy Birthday You in 2008 through Stiff Records. He toured frequently with peers Laura Marling, Slow Club and Johnny Flynn, and opened for acts such as Okkervil River, Tilly & The Wall and Jay Reatard.

In December 2008, Young announced that he would no longer be performing as Jay Jay Pistolet, one month before he appeared in Mojo Magazine's Ones To Watch for 2009.

In 2010, he started his current band, The Vaccines, along with bandmates Freddie Cowan, Árni Árnason and Pete Robertson and gained worldwide success.

In late 2019, Young announced a side project, Halloweens, with his bandmate Timothy Lanham, also from The Vaccines.

In 2020, during the covid lockdown, he released a string of Soundcloud only bedroom recordings under the name Question Young.

In 2023 he released two songs under the name Room Service with producer Cole M.G.N..

Young has occasionally written with and produced for other artists. In 2022, Young co-produced five tracks on Alfie Templeman's debut album Mellow Moon. Justin wrote the song Anchor on the 2025 Mumford and Sons album Rushmere.

== Personal life ==
During his early twenties, Young lived with three other musicians in a flat in Chelsea, London: Marcus Mumford and Winston Marshall of the folk rock band Mumford and Sons, and Alan Pownall of electro-pop outfit Pale. The flat served as a creative hub for the late-2000s West London indie-folk scene. Mumford was a frequent early collaborator with Young as Jay Jay Pistolet, performing on recordings and playing in his band.

In 2011, Young underwent three separate throat operations to treat haemorrhaging due to recurrent vocal polyps.

He has spent periods of time living in Los Angeles, Paris and New York but has stated that he currently lives in London.

Young is a Manchester United fan.
