= The Vaccines =

British indie rock band

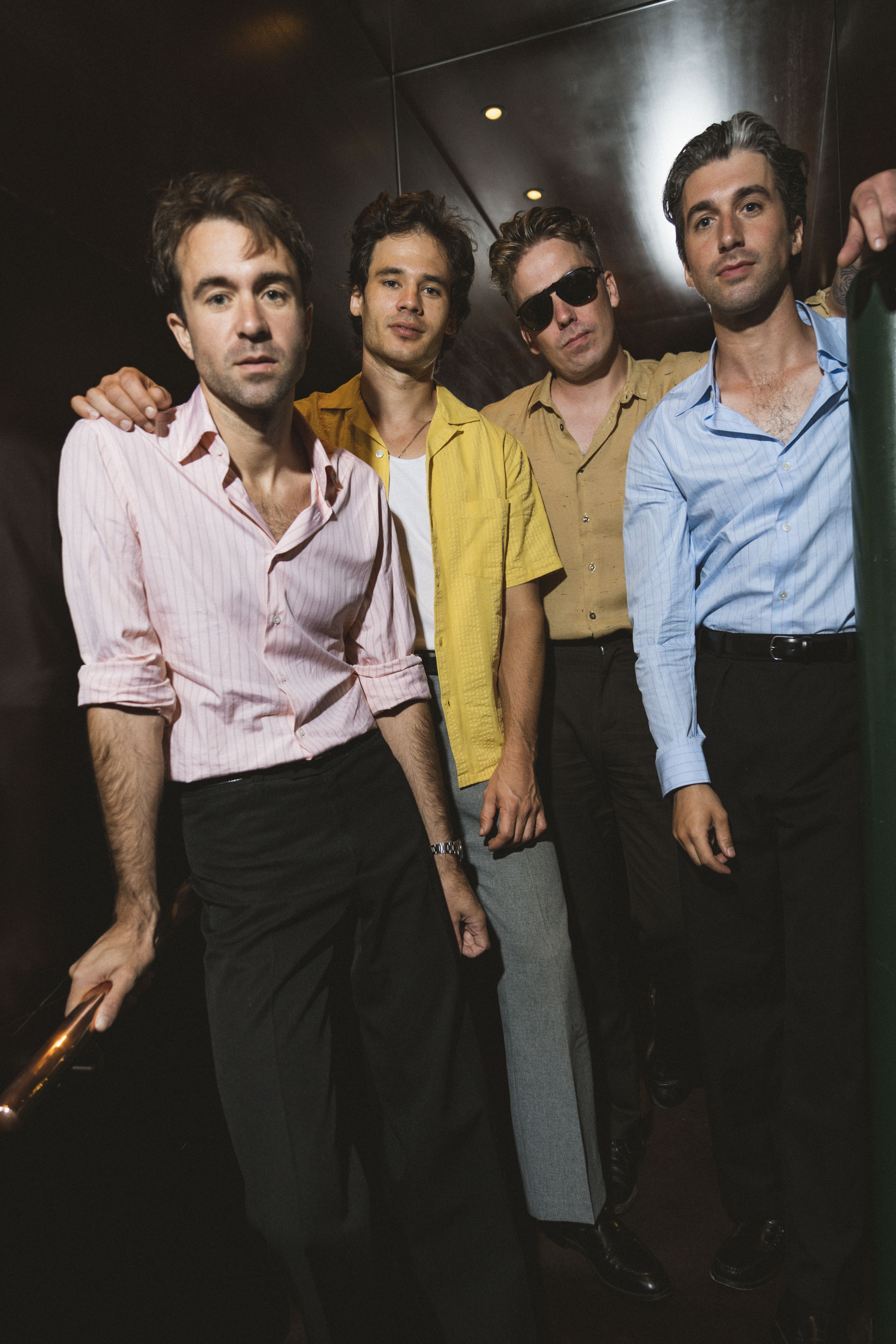
- The Vaccines in London, 2023

Background information
- Origin: West London, England
- Genre: Indie rock
- Years active: 2010–present
- Labels: Luaka Bop; O Genesis; AWAL; Marshall Teller; Columbia
- Members: Justin Hayward-Young; Árni Árnason; Timothy Lanham; Yoann Intonti
- Past members: Pete Robertson; Freddie Cowan
- Website: thevaccines.com

The Vaccines are an English indie rock band, formed in West London in 2010 by Justin Hayward-Young, Freddie Cowan, Arni Arnason and Pete Robertson. The band currently consists of Young (lead vocals, guitars), Árni Árnason (bass, vocals), Timothy Lanham (guitars, keys, vocals) and Yoann Intonti (drums).

The Vaccines have toured extensively, playing with and opening up for acts such as the Rolling Stones, Arcade Fire, Arctic Monkeys, Kings of Leon, Phoenix, Red Hot Chili Peppers, Imagine Dragons, and Muse.

The band's debut album was the best-selling debut album of 2011 in the United Kingdom, drawing comparisons to the Ramones, the Strokes, and the Jesus and Mary Chain. The band have released six studio albums: What Did You Expect from the Vaccines? (2011), Come of Age (2012), English Graffiti (2015), Combat Sports (2018), Back in Love City (2021), and Pick-Up Full of Pink Carnations (2024). They have sold two million records worldwide.

== History ==
=== 2010: Formation ===
Composed of Justin Hayward-Young (known professionally as Justin Young), Árni Árnason (bass), Pete Robertson (drums) and Freddie Cowan (guitar and younger brother of Tom Cowan from the Horrors), the band was initially formed by Young and Cowan in summer 2009. After months of attempting to perfect their sound, the band uploaded the demo "If You Wanna" to YouTube in August 2010. The song immediately received praise from people such as Zane Lowe, who named it the 'Hottest Record in the World' on 18 August 2010. After the band's first-ever London show, a Clash magazine article predicted that the band could help usher in a new era for guitar music.

During the Vaccines' debut UK tour between September and November 2010, interest in the band led to a debut London performance at a friend's pub, The Flowerpot, Kentish Town. The show sold out and audience members included Alex Kapranos and Marcus Mumford—200 people were turned away. The performance was awarded a "4/5" rating by The Guardian and was described by Clash magazine as "fantastic, exhilarating and exciting". During this time, the band performed live on Later with Jools Holland—the occasion marked the first time that a band has ever appeared on the programme prior to releasing a single.

On 29 November 2010, the band released its debut double A-side single "Wreckin' Bar (Ra Ra Ra)"/"Blow It Up" in the UK; the single was limited to 1000 copies and was released on the Marshall Teller Records label. Both of the music videos for each of the double A-side songs were directed by Doug Hart, former bass player with the Jesus and Mary Chain. "Wreckin' Bar (Ra Ra Ra)", one minute and 24 seconds in duration, was named "Track of the Day" by Q magazine and was critically well received.

The band recorded its first ever radio session for Marc Riley's BBC 6 Music show in December 2010. Following the release of its debut double A-side single, the band continued to tour the UK in the latter part of 2010, while concurrently recording its debut album. The band was followed by documentary makers from Vice Magazine during this tour.

=== 2011: What Did You Expect from the Vaccines? ===
On 5 January 2011, the band was placed third in the BBC's Sound of 2011 poll and, in the same week, appeared on the cover of NME for the first time. Following the confirmation of its contract with Columbia Records, the band released its second single "Post Break-Up Sex" on 24 January 2011, and it debuted at No. 32 in the UK. It was during this period that the band was nominated for an MTV Award—'Best New Band of 2011'—and a Critics' Choice Brit Award. Following the band's inaugural NME cover, the Vaccines then participated in the 2011 NME Awards Tour, supporting Crystal Castles. The band also travelled to America for the first time, where Debbie Harry was reportedly part of the audience for the band's New York City show.

Following a trip to the SXSW arts conference, the band then released its debut album What Did You Expect from the Vaccines? on 14 March 2011 through Columbia Records, to generally positive reviews. Reflecting on the album's ten-year anniversary, Justin Young told Atwood Magazine he and the band were "petrified of not being able to capture the energy" they were looking for: "I remember at the time being like, 'This doesn't sound particularly aggressive' or 'It doesn't sound lo-fi enough for my tastes.' Now I listen back and I'm like "Whoa!" I think it probably was, and I'm like "Wow. That's crazy that these songs got played on the radio."

In Autumn 2011, the band was forced to postpone tours of Japan and the US, in addition to shows across Europe, after Young suffered from a recurring vocal issue that had led to three operations within a nine-month period. Despite Young's medical problem, the band still played more than 150 shows in 2011, culminating in two nights at London's O2 Brixton Academy.

On 10 June 2011, the Vaccines performed as a support act for the Arctic Monkeys in a 10,000-capacity tent venue at Don Valley Stadium in Sheffield, UK. The Sheffield performance followed a joint trip that the two bands had made to America, during which time the Vaccines made their network television debut, performing "If You Wanna" on the Late Show with David Letterman. After the Don Valley gig, the band performed at numerous festivals throughout the world during that year's summer season (at the time, the band claimed that it had played around 45 festival shows). The Vaccines ended the summer at the Reading and Leeds Festivals, joined on stage by members of the Horrors. In turn, the Vaccines appeared on stage with the Horrors later in the day. The band was named by NME Magazine as the best band of the weekend.

The Vaccines have frequently collaborated on stage, including guest spots with Lyle Preslar of Minor Threat, Ryan Jarman of the Cribs, members of Savages and Paul Thomson of Franz Ferdinand. In August 2013 they performed in Florida as John Fogerty's backing band.

In August 2011, the Vaccines debuted a new song "Tiger Blood" that was produced by Albert Hammond Jr. of the Strokes in his New York studio.

On Christmas Day 2011, the Vaccines appeared on Top of the Pops for the first time, before welcoming in the New Year on Jools Holland's Annual Hootenanny.

=== 2012: Come of Age ===
The Vaccines recorded their second LP in March 2012 with producer Ethan Johns. Young provided the public with an update: "It's mostly written and we're going into the studio in Belgium in March to start recording so it'll definitely be out this year, without a doubt. We've definitely got six songs written that we all want to be on the record, but there's tonnes of other new songs and we're actually going into the studio out in Australia to work on ideas. I think we're in a good place with it and it's quite exciting."

On 1 April 2012, The Quietus reported that the Vaccines would be releasing a split 7-inch single with R. Stevie Moore through O Genesis Records in aid of Record Store Day, with the Vaccines covering Moore's "Why Should I Love You?" and Moore tackling "Post Break-Up Sex".

In July 2012, during another summer of playing festivals, the band released two free EPs—one is a live EP recorded in Brighton, UK, while the other is a collection of acoustic cover versions, entitled Please, Please Do Not Disturb. The cover version EP features renditions of ABBA, Wire, Nick Lowe and Jonathan Richman songs. Later that month, Cowan spoke about the band's plans to release a series of four singles with each band member writing and recording a B-side song. Cowan will collaborate with his brother, Furse, for his contribution to the project.

The Vaccines' second album, called Come of Age was released on 3 September 2012 in the UK. It reached No. 1 in the album chart, and was certified gold in the UK. The album was released in the US on 4 October 2012 The release was marked by the band's biggest tour to date, including a sold-out show at London's 10,000 capacity Alexandra Palace with support from Fucked Up and Diiv. Young has since been critical of the record, calling it a "creative misstep."

=== 2013: Melody Calling EP ===
In January 2013, the Vaccines were nominated for a Brit Award for Best Live Act, alongside the Rolling Stones, Muse, Mumford & Sons and Coldplay. They were also nominated for two NME Awards: Best British Band and Best Album.

On 29 January 2013, the Vaccines began its first headliner tour of the US with a show at the Paradise Rock Club in Boston, Massachusetts, supported by Australian band San Cisco. This was followed by a support show with Muse at a War Child charity gig at O2 Shepherd's Bush Empire on 18 February 2013.

Other shows in 2013 included London's O2 Arena on 2 May (where the band were supported by the Walkmen), Hyde Park on 6 July (supporting the Rolling Stones), and Glastonbury Festival on 28 June 2013.

The Vaccines featured on the cover of the 30 April 2013 issue of NME magazine, in which they revealed that they were working on some new material which may either be part of an EP or part of a third album. On 24 June 2013, the Vaccines revealed a brand new track titled "Melody Calling" that premiered on Radio 1. As a result, Zane Lowe named the song 'the Hottest Record in the World'. The song also featured on the NME website and on SoundCloud. Melody Calling EP, recorded in Los Angeles by Rich Costey and John Hill, was released on 12 August 2013 with work on the new album scheduled to start in spring 2014.

On 29 October 2013, the short film I Don't Even Know You, detailing the band's tour through 2012 to 2013 was premiered on The Guardian website. The film was produced by PulseFilms.

After taking time off from touring at the end of Summer 2013, members of the band were involved in various different projects, with Cowan travelling to Senegal to play alongside Baaba Maal and the Very Best and Young performing in the US with members of JEFF the Brotherhood and Mumford & Sons.

=== 2015: English Graffiti ===
In August 2014, the Vaccines confirmed that they would complete their third album by the end of the year. The producer Dave Fridmann, who has worked on records for artists including Flaming Lips, MGMT and Tame Impala told NME that the Vaccines want to create a similar sound to Sleater-Kinney's The Woods, though Árni and Young later attributed that statement to Fridmann's habit of lying to the press and not something the band had ever discussed.

In November 2014, after a long break the Vaccines played their first few gigs in India, Vietnam and Hong Kong. The band played new songs from their upcoming third album entitled "Handsome", "Want You So Bad" and "Dream Lover". For this tour, the band expanded to a five-piece, with Cathy Lucas of Fanfarlo and Vanishing Twin accompanying them on keyboards. The band stated in an interview that they would like to put out a single in January 2015 with touring starting in March and an album coming in May.

On 19 January 2015, "Handsome", the first song to be revealed from the new album, was played on BBC Radio 1 by Zane Lowe. When speaking to Lowe about the track, Young announced the forthcoming album would be titled English Graffiti.

On 18 May 2015, English Graffiti was made BBC Radio 6's 'Album of the Day +' where previously unheard tracks were premiered throughout the show, with a live performance of "Dream Lover" and "(All Afternoon) In Love."

The Vaccines have claimed English Graffiti to be "genre defining".

In summer 2015, the band toured across America with Mumford and Sons, as they had done on their previous album. They repeated this in Australia later in the year.

For the English Graffiti live shows, the Vaccines recruited a new touring keyboardist, Timothy Lanham. Formerly of Hunting, a band of childhood friends from Australia that had relocated to London, Lanham was a bowling alley employee when he was brought together with Cowan and Young to be the wedding band at the nuptials of Alan Pownall and Gabriella Wilde in Tuscany, Italy in September 2014, and they eventually invited him to join them.

On 17 June 2016, the Vaccines announced Pete Robertson's amicable departure "to focus on other things", with their recent U.S. tour which had ended a month prior to the announcement being the drummer's last shows with the band. To fulfill their upcoming live commitments, the band recruited Yoann Intonti of Spector on drums.

On 26 and 28 August 2016, the Vaccines played at the Reading and Leeds Festivals, some of their first British concerts with Intonti playing drums, before headliners Fall Out Boy and Biffy Clyro. On the same day as their Reading performance, Justin Young revealed details of their upcoming fourth studio album to DIY, saying that "we've got most of the record written, actually. We've got like twenty songs – I don't know how many of them are gonna end up being Vaccines songs. I think we'll just record in the new year and see what happens!"

=== 2018: Combat Sports ===
In January 2017, it was reported that the Vaccines' fourth album would contain songs "like polished '70s and '80s rock: Big Star, Todd Rundgren, Guided by Voices – that kind of stuff. Very smooth, like a super FM radio sound," stated Young. "Someone to Lose", "Out on the Street", and "Young American" were among the songs considered for the album, with the band looking for "a polished pop producer" to handle the recording sessions that were scheduled to take place in February.

After published photos taken of the remaining members in the wake of Robertson's departure gave the impression that the Vaccines would continue as a three-piece, Cowan stated that Intonti and English Graffiti touring keyboardist Timothy Lanham had officially joined the band. "After Pete left, we took some photos with just the three of us and it felt weird. And equally we had these guys that were really involved in making the record, so it felt like the right thing to do. You want to embrace the new chapter, not hold on to what was," said Cowan.

In April 2017, the Vaccines played in Shanghai, China where they premiered three new songs: "Your Love Is My Favourite Band", "Surfing in the Sky" and "Rolling Stones".

They wrote and performed the theme tune for Dennis & Gnasher: Unleashed!, which began on the BBC in November 2017.

In October 2017, the band announced Combat Sports would be the name of their fourth studio album. On 3 January 2018 "I Can't Quit", the first single to be taken from the new album, was released. It was BBC Radio 1's 'Hottest Record in the World'. Combat Sports charted at No. 4 in the UK upon release.

In April 2018 the band embarked on a UK tour to promote the album, culminating with a sold-out show at London's 10,200 capacity venue Alexandra Palace. This was followed by an extensive world tour that took in Europe, Central & North America and Asia. On 29 May 2018, during a summer of festivals, the band again opened for the Rolling Stones' - this time at their concert in Southampton.

In July 2018, the band played two new songs entitled "All My Friends" and "Let's Jump Off the Top". From August, they embarked on a European stadium tour with Imagine Dragons. With Árni absent for personal reasons, the band were joined throughout the summer by Ru Jarvis of the Maccabees on bass.

In November 2018, they released the stand-alone single "All My Friends Are Falling in Love".

In January 2019, the band embarked on a tour of Australia performing at the Falls Festival. This was followed by more extensive touring in 2019.

In July 2019, it was announced that the band had recorded a duet with Kylie Minogue to accompany the trailer for the Aardman Animations Oscar nominated A Shaun the Sheep Movie: Farmageddon.

In late 2019, Young and Lanham unveiled their new band 'Halloweens'. Their debut album Morning Kiss at the Acropolis was released in 2020 and included the singles "My Baby Looks Good With Another", "Hannah, You're Amazing" and "Rock Bottom Rock".

=== 2021: Back in Love City ===
In April 2020, the band released a new YouTube-only song, "I Never Go Out on Fridays". This was followed by another new song, "Internet Disco" featuring Agent Emotion, which was featured on the NHS fundraiser Songs for the National Health Service alongside unreleased songs by other British acts such as Foals and Wolf Alice.

In February 2021, the Vaccines released a covers EP entitled Cosy Karaoke Vol. 1. The EP consisted of cover versions of songs by Waxahatchee, Kacey Musgraves, Queens of the Stone Age, Buffalo Springfield, Wanda Jackson and the Tornadoes. This preceded the release of a limited edition 10 year anniversary version of What Did You Expect from the Vaccines? on pink vinyl. The band stated that the EP should act as a palate cleanser for what was to come next.

On 13 May 2021, the band released the first single from their, as yet, untitled fifth record called "Headphones Baby". This was followed by singles "Back in Love City" and "Alone Star". With touring still restricted by the global COVID-19 pandemic, the band made just one festival appearance in 2021 as secret guests at Latitude Festival.

On 10 September 2021, the Vaccines released their fifth studio album, Back in Love City. Recorded at Sonic Ranch just outside of El Paso, Texas in December 2019, the album was produced by Daniel Ledinsky with additional production by Fryars.

Back in Love City charted at No.5 in UK upon release, marking the band's fifth consecutive top 5 album, with NME citing a band "still at their very best and still brimming with ideas and invention". Following a tour of small venues around the UK for Music Venue Trust, the Vaccines announced an album tour for April 2022.

On 15 March 2023, Cowan announced that he was leaving the Vaccines "for the foreseeable future" and had already informed the other members of his decision during the previous summer. Having just become a father, Cowan was reluctant to be away on tour all the time. He also hoped to "have another chapter together when the time is right." In the wake of Cowan's departure, Timothy Lanham took up lead guitar duties with former Drowners frontman and longtime friend of the band Matt Hitt becoming their live keyboardist and guitarist. Meanwhile, Young stated on behalf of the band that they had just finished their sixth album and were "incredibly excited for all the fun and creativity that lies ahead."

=== 2023: Pick-Up Full of Pink Carnations ===
In September 2023, the Vaccines announced their sixth studio album, Pick-Up Full of Pink Carnations, alongside the release of its lead single "Heartbreak Kid", recorded in Los Angeles with producer Andrew Wells and mixed by Dave Fridmann.

To coincide with the release of the album, the band announced a UK and European tour as well as a US tour with the Kooks followed by extensive touring and major festival appearances across Asia, Latin America, Australia and North America. They were supported by Thus Love across America and Australian band Delivery in Europe.

The album was released on 12 January 2024 and reached number 3 in the UK Album Chart.

=== 2026: What Did You Expect From The Vaccines? anniversary tour ===
To celebrate the 15-year anniversary of the band's first album, the band announced a tour in August 2025, where they would play the album in full, around the UK and Europe. The tour featured 20 dates, from February to April and included two sold out nights at Brixton Academy. British dates featured support from American alternative rock band Brigitte Calls Me Baby. In March 2026, the band expanded their tour to Australia and New Zealand in November, playing alongside Two Door Cinema Club on their Tourist History anniversary tour. The final anniversary announcement came in August 2026 for a special one off show in Mexico City. In July, they were announced they would support kasabian for their ‘NOTHING BETTER THAN THIS’ tour in December 2026.

== Band members ==
Current members

- Justin Hayward-Young – lead vocals, rhythm guitar (2010–present); drums, percussion (2016–2017)
- Árni Árnason – bass guitar, backing vocals (2010–present)
- Timothy Lanham – keyboards, auxiliary percussion, backing vocals (2017–present); lead guitar (2023–present), rhythm guitar (2017–2023)
- Yoann Intonti – drums, percussion (2017–present)

Current touring musicians

- Matt Hitt – keyboards, rhythm guitar, backing vocals (2023–present)

Former members

- Pete Robertson – drums, percussion, backing vocals (2010–2016)
- Freddie Cowan – lead guitar, backing vocals (2010–2023)

== Discography ==
Studio albums

- What Did You Expect from the Vaccines? (2011)
- Come of Age (2012)
- English Graffiti (2015)
- Combat Sports (2018)
- Back in Love City (2021)
- Pick-Up Full of Pink Carnations (2024)

== Awards and nominations ==
Year	Organisation	Nominated work	Award	Result
2011	BBC Sound of 2011	The Vaccines	Sound of 2011	Third
2011	Sweden GAFFA Awards	The Vaccines	Best Foreign New Act	Won
2011	MTV Awards	The Vaccines	Brand New for 2011	Nominated
2011	Quintessentially Awards	The Vaccines	Best Emerging Talent	Won
2011	MOJO Awards	The Vaccines	Best New Act	Nominated
2011	Q Awards	The Vaccines	Best New Band	Nominated
2011	BRIT Awards	The Vaccines	Critics' Choice	Runners-up
2012	NME Awards	The Vaccines	Best New Band	Won
2012	NME Awards	What Did You Expect from the Vaccines?	Best Album	Nominated
2012	XFM	The Vaccines	New Music Award	Won
2012	BRIT Awards	The Vaccines	Best New Artist	Nominated
2013	NME Awards	The Vaccines	Best British Band	Nominated
2013	NME Awards	Come of Age	Best Album	Nominated
2013	BRIT Awards	The Vaccines	Best Live Act	Nominated
