= List of Live Lounge cover versions =

This is an alphabetical list of the covers performed on the Live Lounge section of the 2026- radio show Charlie and Jerry on BBC Radio 1 (and previously on The Jo Whiley Show, Fearne Cotton's radio show, Clara Amfo's show, and Rickie, Melvin, and Charlie before Whiley, Cotton, Amfo, Odoom, and Hayward-Williams left the show), hosted by Charlie Hedges and Jeremiah Asiamah. There are also a few that were performed at the Live Lounge tent at festivals, such as Glastonbury Festival and Radio 1's Big Weekend. Also some of the covers are performed on the Live Lounge Tour, in which the songs are performed at a location that means something to the artist.

Songs that appear on Live Lounge compilations or other releases are footnoted.

== 0–9 ==
Artist/group	Song(s)	Date(s)
5 Seconds of Summer	"I Miss You" by Blink-182 "Drown" by Bring Me the Horizon "No Roots" by Alice Merton "Dancing with a Stranger" by Sam Smith & Normani	4 September 2014; 16 December 2015; 12 June 2018; 25 June 2019
The 1975	"So Good to Me" by Chris Malinchak "What Makes You Beautiful" by One Direction "Rather Be" by Clean Bandit "Sorry" by Justin Bieber "Thank U, Next" by Ariana Grande "A Million Love Songs" by Take That	22 April 2013; 4 September 2013/30 September 2016; 18 February 2014; 11 February 2016/30 September 2016; 26 November 2018; 11 October 2022
3OH!3	"Guns and Horses" by Ellie Goulding (Note: Appears on Radio 1's Live Lounge – Volume 5)	14 July 2010

== A ==
Artist/group	Song(s)	Date(s)
Adele	"Last Nite" by the Strokes "Make You Feel My Love" by Bob Dylan "Black and Gold" by Sam Sparro "Promise This" by Cheryl Cole	23 January 2008; 22 September 2008; 22 September 2008; 27 January 2011
AJ Tracey	"Boy's a Liar" by PinkPantheress	25 March 2025
Akon	"The Take Over, the Breaks Over" by Fall Out Boy "You Make It Real" by James Morrison	23 July 2007; 3 November 2008
Alan Fletcher	"Wonderwall" by Oasis	30 November 2007
Alesha Dixon	"Sex on Fire" by Kings of Leon (Note: Appears on Radio 1's Live Lounge – Volume 4) "God and Satan" by Biffy Clyro	21 November 2008; 9 September 2010
Alessia Cara	"Hotline Bling" by Drake	7 January 2016
Alex Clare	"We Are Young" by fun. (feat. Janelle Monáe)	29 May 2012
Alex Warren	"Rich Girl" by Hall & Oates	15 July 2025
Alexis Jordan	"Grenade" by Bruno Mars (Note: Appears on Radio 1's Live Lounge – Volume 6)	21 February 2011
Alfie Templeman	"As It Was" by Harry Styles	26 May 2022
Alicia Keys	"How to Save a Life" by the Fray "everything i wanted" by Billie Eilish	2 November 2007; 6 February 2020
The All-American Rejects	"Beautiful" by Christina Aguilera "Womanizer" by Britney Spears	10 June 2009
All Time Low	"Alejandro" by Lady Gaga "Hold It Against Me" by Britney Spears "Elastic Heart" by Sia "Green Light" by Lorde	7 July 2010; 24 May 2011; 9 April 2015; 30 March 2017
Alma	"Dusk Till Dawn" by Zayn (feat. Sia)	21 November 2017
Alphabeat	"Black and Gold" by Sam Sparro	4 June 2008
Aloe Blacc	"99 Problems" by Jay-Z "O.P.P." by Naughty by Nature "Magic" by Coldplay	25 April 2011; 3 April 2014; 3 April 2014
Alt-J	"Too Close" by Alex Clare "Latch" by Disclosure (feat. Sam Smith)	17 July 2012; 29 September 2014
AlunaGeorge	"This Is How We Do It" by Montell Jordan "La La La" by Naughty Boy "Company" by Justin Bieber	16 October 2012; 30 July 2013; 15 April 2016
The Amazons	"New Rules" by Dua Lipa	2 October 2017
Amplify Dot	"Holy Grail" by Jay-Z	6 August 2013
Amy Winehouse	"Valerie" by the Zutons (Note: Appears on Radio 1's Live Lounge – Volume 2) (Note: Appears on Winehouse's "Back to Black")	10 January 2007
Angel Haze	"Drunk in Love" by Beyoncé	27 January 2014
Anna Calvi	"Naughty Girl" by Beyoncé	16 February 2012
Anne-Marie	"This Girl" by Cookin' on 3 Burners "Say You'll Be There" by Spice Girls "Walk on Water/Finders Keepers/New Rules/No Scrubs" by Eminem (feat. Beyoncé)/Mabel (feat. Kojo Funds)/Dua Lipa/TLC "Fairytale of New York" (with Ed Sheeran) by the Pogues (feat. Kirsty MacColl) "Watermelon Sugar" by Harry Styles "Unholy" by Sam Smith and Kim Petras	20 July 2016; 16 February 2017; 23 November 2017; 12 December 2017; 10 September 2020; 10 November 2022
Arcade Fire	"Maps" by Yeah Yeah Yeahs "Green Light" by Lorde	9 September 2005; 14 July 2017
Ariana Grande	"Them Changes" by Thundercat	5 September 2018
Arctic Monkeys	"Love Machine" by Girls Aloud (Note: Appears on Radio 1's Live Lounge) "You Know I'm No Good" by Amy Winehouse "Katy on a Mission" by Katy B (Note: Appears on Radio 1's Live Lounge – Volume 3) "Hold On, We're Going Home" by Drake	19 January 2006; 16 April 2007; 25 January 2012; 13 September 2013
Arlissa	"All I Want for Christmas Is You" by Mariah Carey	20 December 2012
Arlo Parks	"My Future" by Billie Eilish "Stateside" by PinkPantheress	24 September 2020; 7 April 2026
Artemas	"Washing Machine Heart" by Mitski	13 November 2025
Asher Roth	"Boom Boom Pow" by the Black Eyed Peas	12 May 2009
Athlete	"If I Ain't Got You" by Alicia Keys "With Every Heartbeat" by Robyn and Kleerup	28 January 2005; 5 September 2007
Atumpan	"Diallo" by Wyclef Jean	22 August 2013
The Automatic	"Gold Digger" by Kanye West (feat. Jamie Foxx) "Love in This Club" by Usher (feat. Young Jeezy)	5 June 2006; 20 August 2008
Avril Lavigne	"The Scientist" by Coldplay "Tik Tok" by Kesha "Heartbeats" by José González	6 July 2007; 8 March 2011; 8 March 2011

== B ==
Artist/group	Song(s)	Date(s)
B.o.B	"The Kids Don't Stand a Chance" by Vampire Weekend "Kids" by MGMT "Paradise" by Coldplay	27 May 2010; 27 May 2010; 19 June 2012
Band of Skulls	"Changed the Way You Kiss Me" by Example	8 February 2012
Basement Jaxx	"Maneater" by Nelly Furtado "New in Town" by Little Boots	31 August 2006; 25 June 2009
Bastille	"Locked out of Heaven" by Bruno Mars "We Can't Stop" by Miley Cyrus "Earth Song/Common People" by Michael Jackson/Pulp "Final Song/7 Days/The Final Countdown" by MØ/Craig David/Europe "Drop It Like It's Hot/Royals/Single Ladies (Put a Ring on It)/Only Girl (In the World)/You Got the Love/Roar" by Snoop Dogg (feat. Pharrell Williams)/Lorde/Beyoncé/Rihanna/Candi Staton/Katy Perry "Eastside" (with Marshmello) by Benny Blanco, Halsey and Khalid	21 January 2013; 9 September 2013; 10 February 2014; 14 September 2016; 25 May 2017; 6 November 2018
Bat for Lashes	"Sweet Dreams (Are Made of This)" by Eurythmics "Use Somebody" by Kings of Leon	12 February 2008; 9 April 2009
Beabadoobee	"A Thousand Miles" by Vanessa Carlton "Taste/Breathless" by Sabrina Carpenter/the Corrs "Chasing Cars" by Snow Patrol	5th October 2022; 23 October 2024; 19 October 2026
Bear's Den	"One Dance" by Drake (feat. Wizkid and Kyla)	21 July 2016
Becky Hill	"Old Town Road" by Lil Nas X (with Sigala) "No Time to Die" by Billie Eilish "Shades of Love" by the Blessed Madonna (feat. the Joy)	18 July 2019; 10 March 2020; 19 October 2023
Bedouin Soundclash	"I Predict a Riot" by Kaiser Chiefs	
The Bees	"A Minha Menina" by Os Mutantes (Note: Appears on The Bees' Sunshine Hit Me)	
Ben Howard	"Call Me Maybe" by Carly Rae Jepsen "Figure 8" by Ellie Goulding "Hideaway" by Kiesza	8 May 2012; 12 December 2012; 23 September 2014
Benjamin Francis Leftwich	"Titanium" by David Guetta feat. Sia	24 February 2012
Benson Boone	"Lose Control" by Teddy Swims	26 March 2024
Beverley Knight	"Trouble" by Coldplay	
Biffy Clyro	"Umbrella" by Rihanna (feat. Jay-Z) "Love Sex Magic" by Ciara (feat. Justin Timberlake) "Killing in the Name" by Rage Against the Machine "Fight for This Love" by Cheryl Cole "We Built This City" by Starship "Diane Young" by Vampire Weekend "Tilted" by Christine and the Queens "WAP" by Cardi B and Megan Thee Stallion "Golden" by Huntrix	July 2007; 16 September 2009; 15 January 2010; 23 May 2010 (Big Weekend); 25 October 2012; 19 August 2013; 2 September 2016; 3 September 2020; 18 September 2025
The Big Pink	"Sweet Dreams" by Beyoncé "Somebody That I Used to Know" by Gotye (feat. Kimbra)	7 November 2009; 17 January 2012
Big Sean	"All Falls Down" by Kanye West (feat. Syleena Johnson)	11 January 2012
Birdy	"The A Team" by Ed Sheeran "Let Her Go" by Passenger "Firestone" by Kygo (feat. Conrad Sewell) "Fast Car" by Tracy Chapman	19 July 2011; 18 September 2013
The Black Eyed Peas	"Heartbreaker" by will.i.am	22 May 2009
Black Kids	"No Substitute Love" by Estelle	9 July 2008
The Blackout	"Shut Up & Drive" by Rihanna "I Knew You Were Trouble" by Taylor Swift	20 November 2009; 19 January 2013
Blame (and guests)	"On to the Next One" by Jay-Z and Swizz Beatz	12 May 2010
Blink-182	"Boys Don't Cry" by the Cure	12 June 2004
Bloc Party	"Say It Right" by Nelly Furtado "Love Will Tear Us Apart" by Joy Division "Call the Shots" by Girls Aloud	30 January 2009
Blonde	"Work" by Rihanna (feat. Drake)	14 April 2016
Blood Orange	"Don't Panic" by Coldplay	18 November 2025
Blossoms	"In2" by WSTRN "Let Me Love You" by DJ Snake (feat. Justin Bieber) "In da Club/Careless Whisper" by 50 Cent/George Michael "The Man" by the Killers "Better Now" by Post Malone "Adore You" by Harry Styles "360/Music Sounds Better with You" (with Rick Astley) by Charli XCX/Stardust "Stop the Wedding!" by Ashe	28 January 2016; 6 September 2016; 15 February 2017; 1 May 2018; 15 November 2018 30 January 2020; 14 October 2024; 5 October 2026
Bombay Bicycle Club	"Whatcha Say" by Jason Derulo "Video Games" by Lana Del Rey "F for You" by Disclosure "In the Bleak Midwinter" "Lose You to Love Me" by Selena Gomez	28 November 2009; 17 October 2011; 27 February 2014; 18 December 2014 23 January 2020
Boy Kill Boy	"Maneater" by Nelly Furtado	
Boys Like Girls	"With You" by Chris Brown	1 December 2008
Bridget Kelly	"Ex-Factor" by Lauryn Hill	22 April 2013
Bruno Mars	"California Gurls" by Katy Perry "All I Ask" by Adele	19 January 2011; 2 November 2016
BTS	"I'll Be Missing You" by Puff Daddy and Faith Evans (feat. 112)	27 July 2021
Bullet for my Valentine	"Witchcraft" by Pendulum	31 July 2010
Busted	"Where Is the Love?" by the Black Eyed Peas	

== C ==
Artist/group	Song(s)	Date(s)
Ca7riel & Paco Amoroso	"Wannabe" by Spice Girls	24 September 2026
Cage the Elephant	"Kids" by MGMT "Rolling in the Deep" by Adele	6 October 2008; 19 March 2011
Calvin Harris	"Brianstorm" by Arctic Monkeys "Fire" by Kasabian	15 May 2007; 12 August 2009
Camila Cabello	"Someone You Loved" by Lewis Capaldi "Good 4 U" by Olivia Rodrigo "Diet Pepsi" by Addison Rae	2 October 2019; 7 September 2021; 30 September 2024
Carly Rae Jepsen	"Runaways" by the Killers "King" by Years & Years	12 September 2012; 16 November 2015
Cat Burns	"I Like the Way You Kiss Me" by Artemas "Folded" by Kehlani	16 July 2024; 6 November 2025
Catfish and the Bottlemen	"I Will Never Let You Down" by Rita Ora "Black Skinhead" by Kanye West	19 September 2014; 5 February 2015
Cee-Lo Green	"Radioactive" by Kings of Leon "Inhaler" by Miles Kane	3 November 2010; 30 September 2011
Charli XCX	"Shake It Off" by Taylor Swift "IDGAF" (with Dua Lipa, Zara Larsson, MØ and Alma) by Dua Lipa "TooTimeTooTimeTooTime" (with Christine and the Queens) by the 1975	10 February 2015; 21 February 2018; 5 September 2019
Charlie Puth	"How Deep is Your Love" by Calvin Harris "Somebody Else" by the 1975 "Bon Appétit" by Katy Perry "In My Blood" by Shawn Mendes	19 September 2015; 15 September 2016; 15 June 2017; 8 June 2018
Charlotte Church	"Let Me Love You" by Mario	29 June 2005
Chase and Status	"Prayin'" (feat. Mali) by Plan B "Rope" (feat. Delilah) by Foo Fighters "Strong" by London Grammar "Fade" (feat. Tom Grennan) by Kanye West "Never Enough" (feat. Debbie) by Turnstile	20 October 2010; 6 May 2011; 24 September 2013; 23 September 2016; 14 October 2026
Cherry Ghost	"Welcome to the Black Parade" by My Chemical Romance	27 June 2007
Cheryl Cole	"Fireflies" by Owl City	23 March 2010
Chester French	"Underdog" by Kasabian	2 May 2010
Chiddy Bang	"Marvin & Chardonnay" by Big Sean feat. Kanye West and Roscoe Dash	9 February 2012
Chipmunk	"I'm Not Alone" by Calvin Harris "Killing in the Name" by Rage Against the Machine	5 October 2009; 14 April 2011
Chris Martin	"Graceland" by Paul Simon	5 September 2017
Christine and the Queens	"Sorry" by Beyoncé	13 September 2016
Chvrches	"Stay Another Day" by East 17 "Team" by Lorde "Cry Me a River" by Justin Timberlake "What Do You Mean?" by Justin Bieber "Somebody Else" by the 1975	15 December 2013; 11 March 2014; 19 February 2015; 18 December 2015; 15 March 2018
Circa Waves	"Love Me like You Do" by Ellie Goulding "Paris" by the Chainsmokers	17 November 2015; 14 March 2017
Clean Bandit	"Mirrors" by Justin Timberlake "Royals" by Lorde "Busy Earnin'" by Jungle "Work From Home/Gotta Get Thru This" (with Louisa Johnson) by Fifth Harmony (feat. Ty Dolla Sign)/Daniel Bedingfield "New Rules/Thong Song" by Dua Lipa/Sisqó	4 August 2013; 16 January 2014; 8 November 2014; 5 September 2016; 14 November 2017
CMAT	"Sports Car" by Tate McRae	1 September 2025
Coldplay	"Have Yourself a Merry Little Christmas" by Judy Garland "White Christmas" by Bing Crosby "We Found Love" by Rihanna	22 December 2000; 22 December 2005; 27 October 2011
Conan Gray	"The Subway" by Chappell Roan	1 October 2025
Conor Maynard	"Starships" by Nicki Minaj	26 July 2012
Corinne Bailey Rae	"Munich" by Editors "SexyBack" by Justin Timberlake "Golden Touch" by Razorlight	22 February 2006; 5 February 2007
The Courteeners	"About You Now" by Sugababes	4 April 2008
Craig David	"See You Again" (with Sigala) by Wiz Khalifa (feat. Charlie Puth) "Love Yourself" by Justin Bieber "Say My Name/Feed Em to the Lions" by Destiny’s Child/Solo 45 "Wild Thoughts/Music Sounds Better with You" by DJ Khaled (feat. Rihanna and Bryson Tiller)/Stardust "IDGAF" by Dua Lipa "Espresso" by Sabrina Carpenter/"R U Sleeping" by Indo	5 September 2015; 6 January 2016; 9 September 2016; 25 September 2017; 30 January 2018; March 26 2025
Crystal Fighters	"Waiting All Night" by Rudimental	25 June 2013
CSS	"The Sweet Escape/Standing in the Way of Control" by Gwen Stefani feat. Akon/Gossip	17 May 2007

== D ==
Artist/group	Song(s)	Date(s)
Daley	"Do I Wanna Know?" by Arctic Monkeys	22 September 2013
Dan Croll	"Roar" by Katy Perry	14 September 2013
Dananananaykroyd	"Made Up Stories" by Go:Audio	26 May 2009
Daniel Bedingfield	"Somebody Told Me" by The Killers	11 February 2005
Daniel Merriweather	"Wonderful Christmastime" (feat. Mark Ronson) by Paul McCartney "In for the Kill" by La Roux	15 December 2008; 18 May 2009
Dappy	"We Will Rock You" by Queen	27 February 2012
Darlia	"Team" by Lorde	13 May 2014
Darwin Deez	"Teenage Dream" by Katy Perry	19 October 2010
Daughter	"Get Lucky" by Daft Punk feat. Pharrell Williams	27 April 2013
Dave	"Born to Die" by Lana Del Rey	16 February 2018
David Brent	"Have Yourself a Merry Little Christmas" by Frank Sinatra	15 December 2016
David Gray	"Smile Like You Mean It" by the Killers	24 August 2005
David Jordan	"Stop and Stare" by OneRepublic	14 May 2008
David Kushner	"Lost on You" by Lewis Capaldi	6 July 2023
Deap Vally	"Lightning Bolt" by Jake Bugg	21 February 2013
Declan McKenna	"Malibu" by Miley Cyrus "(It Goes Like) Nanana/So Much In Love" by Peggy Gou/D.O.D.	27 July 2017; 9 October 2023
Delilah	"Rope" (feat. Chase and Status) by Foo Fighters "R.I.P." by Rita Ora (feat. Tinie Tempah)	6 May 2011; 15 May 2012
Delphic	"3 Words" by Cheryl Cole "Just for Tonight" by One Night Only	15 March 2010; 23 March 2010
Demi Lovato	"Take Me to Church" by Hozier "Too Good at Goodbyes" by Sam Smith "Disease/Perfect Celebrity" by Lady Gaga	9 September 2015; 13 November 2017; 22 October 2025
Dermot Kennedy	"Happy Xmas (War Is Over)" (with Ellie Goulding) by John Lennon "Anti-Hero" by Taylor Swift	17 December 2019; 15 November 2022
Devlin	"Blind Faith" by Chase and Status feat. Liam Bailey "No Church in the Wild" (with Ed Sheeran and Labrinth) by Jay-Z and Kanye West (feat. Frank Ocean)	1 February 2011; 21 August 2012
Diana Vickers	"Just Say Yes" by Snow Patrol	22 April 2010
Diddy Dirty Money	"Like a G6" by Far East Movement	20 January 2011
Dionne Bromfield	"Animal" by Neon Trees	16 March 2011
Disciples	"Slide" by Calvin Harris (feat. Frank Ocean and Migos)	16 May 2017
Disclosure	"Need U (100%)" (with Sam Smith) by Duke Dumont (feat. A*M*E) "Hotline Bling" (with Sam Smith) by Drake	5 June 2013; 18 November 2015
Dizzee Rascal	"That's Not My Name" (feat. Chrome) by the Ting Tings "Dirty Cash (Money Talks)" by the Adventures of Stevie V	2 July 2008; 17 September 2009
DJ Fresh	"Save the World" (with Fleur East) by Swedish House Mafia "All I Want" (with Ellie Goulding) by Kodaline	14 July 2011; 26 September 2014
DNCE	"Hands to Myself" by Selena Gomez	2016
Doja Cat	"Red Room" by Hiatus Kaiyote	26 October 2023
Donae'o	"Say Yes" by Floetry "The Lazy Song" by Bruno Mars	16 February 2010; 1 June 2011
Dua Lipa	"The Hills" by the Weeknd "Cruel" by Snakehips (feat. Zayn) "Rollin/Did You See" by Calvin Harris (feat. Future and Khalid)/J Hus "Do I Wanna Know?" by Arctic Monkeys "Eugene" by Arlo Parks "Sunshine" by Cleo Sol	29 January 2016; 29 September 2016; 2 June 2017; 14 February 2018; 19 April 2021; 7 May 2024
Duffy	"Ready for the Floor" by Hot Chip "You Do Something To Me" by Paul Weller	22 February 2008; 12 February 2009
Duke Dumont	"My Love/Hideaway" by Route 94/Kiesza "Walking With Elephants/Unfinished Sympathy" (feat. Moko) by Ten Walls/Massive Attack feat. Shara Nelson	18 March 2014; 5 September 2014

== E ==
Artist/group	Song(s)	Date(s)
Eamon	"The Scientist" by Coldplay	
Ed Sheeran	"Traktor" by Wretch 32 "Heaven" by Emeli Sandé "Swim Good" by Frank Ocean "Empire State of Mind" by Jay Z (feat. Alicia Keys) "No Church in the Wild" (with Devlin and Labrinth) by Jay-Z and Kanye West (feat. Frank Ocean) "Stay with Me" by Sam Smith "Comin' from Where I'm From" by Anthony Hamilton "Take Me to Church" by Hozier "Dirrty" by Christina Aguilera "Touch" by Little Mix "Fairytale of New York" (with Anne-Marie) by the Pogues feat. Kirsty MacColl	13 June 2011; 8 September 2011; 8 September 2011; 15 February 2012; 21 August 2012; 5 June 2014; 5 June 2014; 30 September 2014; 24 February 2015; 21 February 2017; 12 December 2017
Editors	"Feel Good Inc." by Gorillaz "Acceptable in the 80s" by Calvin Harris "Lullaby" by The Cure (Note: Appears on Radio 1 Established 1967)	13 March 2006; 29 August 2007
Elbow	"Independent Women Part 1" by Destiny's Child "Teardrop" by Massive Attack "1 Thing" by Amerie "Back to Black" by Amy Winehouse	14 February 2002; 7 August 2003; 26 August 2005; 5 June 2008
Eliza Doolittle	"Let the Sun Shine" by Labrinth "Treasure" by Bruno Mars	15 October 2010; 16 September 2013
Ella Eyre	"Black and Gold" by Sam Sparro "Scream (Funk My Life Up)" by Paolo Nutini "Elastic Heart" by Sia	9 January 2014; 13 September 2014; 15 May 2015
Ella Henderson	"Say Something" by A Great Big World "Hold Back the River" by James Bay "Wildest Dreams" (with Kygo) by Taylor Swift	22 September 2014; 12 March 2015; 16 December 2015
Ellie Goulding	"Sweet Disposition" by The Temper Trap "The Cave" by Mumford and Sons "Only Girl" by Rihanna "Heartbeats" by the Knife "Some Nights" by fun. "Mirrors" by Justin Timberlake "How Long Will I Love You?" by the Waterboys "Of the Night/Look Right Through" (MK Remix) by Bastille/Storm Queen "All I Want" (with DJ Fresh) by Kodaline "Weathered" by Jack Garratt "Sign of the Times" (with Kygo) by Harry Styles "Happy Xmas (War Is Over)" (with Dermot Kennedy) by John Lennon "Wish You the Best" by Lewis Capaldi	23 February 2010; 22 May 2010; 10 December 2010; 12 March 2011; 2 October 2012; 3 September 2013; 19 November 2013; 19 November 2013; 26 September 2014; 18 November 2015; 31 May 2017; 17 December 2019; 18 May 2023
Elliot Minor	"I Don't Want You Back" by Eamon "Rule the World" by Take That	9 April 2008
Embrace	"How Come" by D12	24 September 2004
Emeli Sandé	"Country House" by Blur	14 February 2012
The Enemy	"Hung Up" by Madonna "Girls Just Want to Have Fun" by Cyndi Lauper "Don't Upset the Rhythm (Go Baby Go)" by Noisettes	18 April 2007; 13 December 2007; 27 April 2009
Enter Shikari	"Day 'n' Nite" by Kid Cudi "Keep Your Head Up" by Ben Howard	11 June 2009; 8 June 2013
Erik Hassle	"Russian Roulette" by Rihanna	6 February 2010
Estelle	"Maybe" by N*E*R*D "She's So Lovely" by Scouting for Girls	19 March 2008
Everything Everything	"Did it Again" by Shakira "What's My Name?" by Rihanna "Mirrors" by Justin Timberlake "Heartbeat Song" by Kelly Clarkson	28 August 2010 (Reading Festival); 18 January 2011; 2 April 2013; 12 November 2015
Example	"Tik Tok" by Kesha "Dominos" by the Big Pink "Teenage Dream" by Katy Perry "Don't Sit Down 'Cause I've Moved Your Chair" by Arctic Monkeys "We Found Love" by Rihanna "We Are Never Ever Getting Back Together" by Taylor Swift "Dark Horse" by Katy Perry feat. Juicy J	23 January 2010; 22 May 2010 (Big Weekend); 15 September 2010; 6 June 2011; 25 October 2011; 6 November 2012; 20 March 2014
Ezra Collective	"Back on 74" by Jungle "NUEVAYoL" by Bad Bunny	4 October 202415 September 2026

== F ==
Artist/group	Song(s)	Date(s)
Fall Out Boy	"So Sick" by Ne-Yo "Love Lockdown" by Kanye West "Uptown Funk" by Mark Ronson feat. Bruno Mars	25 May 2006; 20 October 2008; 13 January 2015
Faithless	"Dub Be Good to Me" by Beats International	22 November 2006
The Feeling	"Doctor Pressure" by Mylo vs. Miami Sound Machine "You're So Vain" by Carly Simon "Time Is Running Out" by Muse "Work" by Kelly Rowland	March 2006 2005; 6 February 2008
Fenech-Soler	"Do It Like a Dude" by Jessie J	5 February 2011
Fifth Harmony	"Exes and Oh's" by Elle King	7 April 2016
Fightstar	"Waitin' for a Superman" by the Flaming Lips "A.M. 180" by Grandaddy "Battlefield" by Jordin Sparks	23 July 2009
Finneas	"Fake Plastic Trees" by Radiohead	11 October 2024
Fixers	"What's My Name?" by Rihanna	15 January 2011
FKA Twigs	"Stay with Me" by Sam Smith "Elastic Heart" by Sia	6 September 2014
Fleur East	"Levels" by Nick Jonas "You Oughta Know" by Alanis Morissette	24 November 2015
Flo	"This Christmas" by Donny Hathaway "Midnight Sun" by Zara Larsson	12 December 2024; 5 August 2026
Flobots	"What's Your Problem?" by the Zutons	1 October 2008
Florence and the Machine	"Halo" by Beyoncé "Take Care" by Drake feat. Rihanna "Angel of My Dreams" by Jade	24 June 2009; 25 November 2011; 3 November 2025
Foals	"Hollaback Girl" by Gwen Stefani "One (Your Name)" by Swedish House Mafia feat. Pharrell Williams "Lost and Not Found" by Chase and Status "What Kind of Man" by Florence and the Machine	14 March 2008; 18 September 2010; 17 July 2013; 30 October 2015
Fontaines D.C.	"Say Yes to Heaven" by Lana Del Rey	2 October 2024
Foo Fighters	"Lyla" by Oasis "Keep the Car Running" by Arcade Fire "Let There Be Rock" by AC/DC	23 August 2005; 17 August 2007; 1 September 2017
Foster the People	"Machu Picchu" by the Strokes "Hold On, We're Going Home" by Drake	29 November 2011; 24 June 2014
Foxes	"Happy" by Pharrell Williams "Photograph" by Ed Sheeran	4 March 2014; 21 July 2015
Frank Turner	"Greatest Day" by Take That "All My Life" by Foo Fighters	12 January 2009; 13 June 2013
Franz Ferdinand	"Mis-Shapes" by Pulp "What You Waiting For?" by Gwen Stefani "Womanizer/We Made You" by Britney Spears/Eminem	2003; 6 February 2004; 6 April 2009
The Fratellis	"Ooh La Hot Love" (mashup "Ooh La La/Hot Love" by Goldfrapp/T.Rex) "Hotel Yorba" by the White Stripes "Mercy/I Could Be So Good For You" by Duffy/Dennis Waterman	30 August 2006; 7 February 2007; 9 May 2008
The Fray	"Hips Don't Lie" by Shakira "Heartless" by Kanye West	21 February 2007; 16 February 2009
Freya Ridings	"Eastside" by Benny Blanco, Halsey and Khalid	25 October 2018
Friendly Fires	"Use Somebody" by Kings of Leon "Lights" by Ellie Goulding "The Edge of Glory" by Lady Gaga	12 November 2008 21 July 2011
fun.	"Somebody That I Used to Know" by Gotye feat. Kimbra "Anything Could Happen" by Ellie Goulding	16 May 2012; 26 February 2013
Fuse ODG	"Sweetest Girl" by Wyclef Jean "Waves" by Mr Probz	28 March 2014; 23 October 2014
The Futureheads	"Hounds of Love" by Kate Bush "Acapella" by Kelis	25 March 2003; 17 April 2010

== G ==
Artist/group	Song(s)	Date(s)
Gabriella Cilmi	"Closer" by Ne-Yo	13 August 2008
Gabrielle Aplin	"Radioactive" by Imagine Dragons "Best Song Ever" by One Direction	11 May 2013; 1 August 2013
Gallant	"Closer" by the Chainsmokers feat. Halsey	21 September 2016
The Gaslight Anthem	"Billie Jean" by Michael Jackson "I Do Not Hook Up" by Kelly Clarkson "Everlong" by Foo Fighters	1 July 2009; 1 July 2009; 24 October 2012
Geese	"You Get What You Give" by New Radicals	4 November 2025
George Ezra	"Counting Stars" by OneRepublic "Girls Just Want to Have Fun" by Cyndi Lauper "I Try" by Macy Gray "Don't Worry, Be Happy" by Bobby McFerrin "These Days" by Rudimental feat. Jess Glynne, Macklemore & Dan Caplen "House on Fire" by Mimi Webb	21 January 2014; 18 September 2014; 16 February 2015; 20 September 2017; 26 March 2018; 17 May 2022
Georgia	"Groovejet (If This Ain't Love)" by Spiller	27 July 2023
Get Cape. Wear Cape. Fly	"Standing in the Way of Control" by Gossip	7 March 2007
Girls Aloud	"Rehab" by Amy Winehouse (Note: Appears on Girls Aloud's "Call the Shots") "With Every Heartbeat" by Robyn and Kleerup "Apologize" by OneRepublic feat. Timbaland "Beneath Your Beautiful" by Labrinth	10 November 2006; November 2007; 25 September 2008; 14 December 2012
Glass Animals	"Mood" by 24kGoldn "Solar Power" by Lorde "End of Beginning" by Djo	26 November 2020; 30 November 2021; 9 October 2024
Glasvegas	"Back to Black" by Amy Winehouse	1 September 2008
Gnash	"Hold Up" by Beyoncé	21 June 2016
Goldfrapp	"Boys Will Be Boys" by the Ordinary Boys "It's Not Over Yet" by Klaxons	27 April 2006; 8 February 2008
Gorgon City	"Doing It Wrong" by Drake "Christmas (Baby Please Come Home)" by Darlene Love; Ibiza Mashup by Various Artists	6 January 2014; 10 December 2014; 2 August 2017
Gorillaz	"Crystalised" by the xx	20 November 2010
Gossip	"Careless Whisper" by George Michael "Love Lockdown" by Kanye West	16 May 2007; 22 June 2009
Graham Coxon	"Time for Heroes" by The Libertines	25 October 2004
Gracie Abrams	"We Can't Be Friends (Wait for Your Love)" by Ariana Grande	18 June 2026
Groove Armada	"Stop Me If You Think You've Heard This One Before" by The Smiths	
Griff	"Pure Imagination" by Gene Wilder	10 December 2024
Guillemots	"Take Me Out" by Franz Ferdinand "Black and Gold" by Sam Sparro "SexyBack" by Justin Timberlake	5 September 2006; 19 May 2008
Gym Class Heroes	"Leave Before the Lights Come On" by Arctic Monkeys	20 July 2007

== H ==
Artist/group	Song(s)	Date(s)
Hadouken!	"99 Problems" by Jay-Z	25 January 2010
Haim	"Wrecking Ball" by Miley Cyrus "XO" by Beyoncé "Bad Liar" by Selena Gomez "Headphones On" by Addison Rae	25 September 2013; 25 February 2014; 11 July 2017; 23 June 2025
Half Moon Run	"The Mother We Share" by Chvrches	30 January 2014
Halsey	"The Sound" by the 1975 "Lucid Dreams" by Juice Wrld	25 February 2016; 7 November 2018
Hard-Fi	"Seven Nation Army" by the White Stripes "Love Is Gone" by David Guetta "Sweat" by Snoop Dogg and David Guetta	19 April 2005; 12 March 2008; 11 August 2011
Harry Styles	"The Chain" by Fleetwood Mac "Wild Thoughts" by DJ Khaled (feat. Rihanna & Bryson Tiller) (Note: Appears on BBC Radio 1's Live Lounge 2017) "Juice" by Lizzo "Wonderful Christmastime" by Paul McCartney "Wet Dream" by Wet Leg "Everybody Wants to Rule the World" by Tears for Fears	11 September 2017; 16 January 2018; 18 December 2019; 24 May 2022; 12 March 2026
Heaven's Basement	"Do What U Want" by Lady Gaga (feat. R. Kelly)	14 November 2013
The Holloways	"The Sweet Escape" by Gwen Stefani (feat. Akon)	20 June 2007
Holly Humberstone	"Kiss Me More" by Doja Cat (feat. SZA) "Ivy" by Frank Ocean "Coming Up Roses" by Harry Styles	8 March 2022; 17 October 2023; 22 April 2026
The Hoosiers	"LoveStoned" by Justin Timberlake "It's a Hit" by We Are Scientists	17 October 2007
Hope of the States	"Beautiful" by Christina Aguilera	
The Horrors	"Best Thing I Never Had" by Beyoncé	13 October 2011
Hot Chip	"Wearing My Rolex" by Wiley "She Wolf" by Shakira	7 May 2008; 10 April 2010
Hozier	"Do I Wanna Know?" by Arctic Monkeys "Problem" by Ariana Grande (feat. Iggy Azalea) "Lay Me Down" by Sam Smith "Sorry Not Sorry" by Demi Lovato	15 September 2014; 30 January 2015; 1 September 2015; 8 November 2018
Hurts	"Once" by Diana Vickers	29 May 2010

== I ==
Artist/group	Song(s)	Date(s)
Ian Brown	"Thriller" by Michael Jackson	
Ida Maria	"Sweet About Me" by Gabriella Cilmi	25 July 2008
Imagine Dragons	"Not Giving In" by Rudimental "Blank Space" by Taylor Swift	11 September 2013; 12 February 2015
Ina Wroldsen	"Padam Padam" (with Jax Jones) by Kylie Minogue	25 October 2023
Indiana	"Ready for Your Love" by Gorgon City feat. MNEK "Waves" by Mr Probz	16 April 2014; 25 September 2014
Inhaler	"Flowers" by Miley Cyrus "Messy" by Lola Young	26 January 2023; 6 February 2025
Iyanya	"Rendezvous" by Craig David	27 March 2014
Izzy Bizu	"Don't Mind" by Kent Jones	27 September 2016

== J ==
Artist/group	Song(s)	Date(s)
Jack Garratt	"Latch" by Disclosure (feat. Sam Smith) "7 Days" by Craig David "Friends" by Francis and the Lights (feat. Bon Iver & Kanye West) "Rain on Me" by Lady Gaga and Ariana Grande	17 November 2015; 8 January 2016; 8 September 2016; 30 June 2020
Jack Johnson	"My Doorbell" by the White Stripes	20 February 2006
Jack Peñate	"1234" by Feist "Kiss" by Prince "Bulletproof" by La Roux	11 December 2007 18 June 2009
Jacob Banks	"Magic" by Coldplay	10 September 2014
Jack & Jack	"Flames" (with Jonas Blue) by David Guetta and Sia	17 August 2018
Jade	"Backbone" by Chase & Status and Stormzy	25 October 2024
Jagwar Ma	"Losing You" by Solange Knowles	28 August 2013
Jaimeson	"Wonderwall" by Oasis	
Jake Bugg	"Happy Xmas (War Is Over)" by John Lennon "Slide Away" by Oasis "Radioactive" by Imagine Dragons "Be the One" by Dua Lipa	19 December 2012; 12 February 2013; 29 July 2014; 20 May 2016
Jamelia	"Numb" by Linkin Park "Take Your Mama" by Scissor Sisters	8 December 2006
James Arthur	"Why'd You Only Call Me When You're High?" by Arctic Monkeys "Hurts" by Emeli Sande "How to Save a Life" by the Fray "Silent Night" by Joseph Mohr & Franz Xaver Gruber "Blue Lights" by Jorja Smith	24 October 2013; 25 October 2016; 21 December 2017; 21 December 2017; 3 July 2018
James Bay	"Forever" by HAIM "FourFiveSeconds" by Rihanna, Kanye West and Paul McCartney (Note: Appears on BBC Radio 1's Live Lounge 2015) "Hymn for the Weekend" by Coldplay "Delicate" by Taylor Swift	16 September 2014; 3 March 2015; 14 July 2016; 24 May 2018
James Blake	"The Drugs Don't Work" by the Verve	6 May 2026
James Blunt	"In a Little While" by U2 "If There's Any Justice" by Lemar "Young Folks" by Peter Bjorn and John	10 February 2006; 12 September 2007
James Morrison	"Valerie" by the Zutons "Out of Time" by Blur "Sex on Fire" by Kings of Leon "Lithium" by Nirvana	6 February 2007; 19 September 2008; 26 September 2011
Jamie Cullum	"Frontin'" by Pharrell Williams feat. Jay-Z	11 February 2004
Jamie T	"When the Night Feels My Song" by Bedouin Soundclash "If I Were a Boy" by Beyoncé "All About That Bass" by Meghan Trainor "The Sound" by the 1975	18 October 2006; 7 September 2009; 7 April 2015; 13 December 2016
Jamie Woon	"Someone Like You" by Adele	26 March 2011
Jason Derulo	"She Said" by Plan B "Forget You" by CeeLo Green "Radioactive" by Imagine Dragons "Royals" by Lorde "Hold On, We're Going Home" by Drake "Trap Queen" by Fetty Wap	3 June 2010; 21 September 2011; 7 September 2013; 10 December 2013; 10 December 2013
Jay Sean	"I Gotta Feeling" by the Black Eyed Peas	27 November 2009
Jax Jones	"On Hold" (with Raye) by the xx "Padam Padam" (with Ina Wroldsen) by Kylie Minogue	2 February 2017; 25 October 2023
Jem	"In My Place" by Coldplay	15 June 2005
Jess Glynne	"Birthday" by Katy Perry "Real Love" by Mary J. Blige "Earned It" by the Weeknd "Let it Go by James Bay "Promises" by Calvin Harris and Sam Smith	8 July 2014; 14 October 2014; 26 March 2015; 3 September 2015; 13 November 2018
Jessie J	"Young Blood" by the Naked and Famous "We Found Love" by Rihanna feat. Calvin Harris "I Knew You Were Trouble" by Taylor Swift	4 March 2011; 17 February 2012; 19 September 2013
Jessie Ware	"Turn Around" by Conor Maynard feat. Ne-Yo "Diamonds" by Rihanna "Jealous" by Labrinth "Jealous" by Nick Jonas "Young Dumb & Broke" by Khalid	18 October 2012; 14 February 2013; 15 January 2015; 13 May 2015; 19 October 2017
J Hus	"21 Questions" by 50 Cent	12 February 2018
JLS	"Stand By Me/Beautiful Girls" by Ben E. King/Sean Kingston "Umbrella" by Rihanna feat. Jay-Z "The Fear" by Lily Allen "Earthquake" by Labrinth	9 May 2009; 15 September 2009; 15 September 2009; 9 December 2011
Joe McElderry	"Telephone" by Lady Gaga feat. Beyoncé "Don't Stop Believin'" by Journey (performed at Radio 1's big weekend)	22 May 2010 (Big Weekend)
John Legend	"Ex-Factor" by Lauryn Hill	8 June 2005
John Martin	"If I Could Change Your Mind" by HAIM	1 April 2014
John Newman	"Lifted" by Naughty Boy and Emeli Sande "Run Away with Me" by Carly Rae Jepsen	15 October 2013; 17 November 2015
JoJo	"Times Like These" by Foo Fighters	November 2004
Joker	"Evolve or Be Extinct" by Wiley	12 April 2012
Jonas Blue	"Hotter than Hell" (with JP Cooper) by Dua Lipa "Flames" (with Jack & Jack) by David Guetta and Sia	28 July 2016; 17 August 2018
Jonas Brothers	"Thinking of You" by Katy Perry	15 June 2009
Jónsi	"Time to Pretend" by MGMT	20 March 2010
Jordin Sparks	"Hot n Cold" by Katy Perry	13 October 2009
Jorja Smith	"Man Down" by Rihanna "All the Stars" by Kendrick Lamar and SZA "Guns in the Distance" by Maverick Sabre "As It Was" by Harry Styles "Driving Home for Christmas" by Chris Rea "A Couple Minutes" by Olivia Dean	7 June 2018; 5 November 2018; 17 September 2020; 4 October 2023; 19 December 2024; 16 October 2026
José González	"Heartbeats" by the Knife (Note: Released as a single)	
Josh Homme	"Blurred Lines" by Robin Thicke feat. T.I. and Pharrell Williams	10 June 2013
Josh Osho	"Too Close" by Alex Clare	15 June 2012
Josh Record	"Burn" by Ellie Goulding	13 April 2014
Joss Stone	"Wonderful World" by James Morrison	
JP Cooper	"Hotter than Hell" (with Jonas Blue) by Dua Lipa "Ex-Factor" by Lauryn Hill "One More Time/Again" by Craig David/Fetty Wap "1-800-273-8255" (with Yungen) by Logic (feat. Alessia Cara and Khalid)	28 July 2016; 28 July 2016; 15 December 2016; 5 October 2017
Jungkook	"Let There Be Love" by Oasis	20 July 2023
Jungle	"Uptown Funk" by Mark Ronson (feat. Bruno Mars) "Birds of a Feather" by Billie Eilish	10 March 2015; 7 October 2024
Just Jack	"Trick Me" by Kelis "Live Your Life" by T.I. feat. Rihanna	1 April 2009
Justin Bieber	"Fast Car" by Tracy Chapman	1 September 2016

== K ==
Artist/group	Song(s)	Date(s)
K Koke	"Someone like You" by Adele	30 November 2012
K'naan	"Roll Away Your Stone" by Mumford and Sons	19 June 2010
Kacey Musgraves	"Kill Bill" by SZA	23 April 2026
Kaiser Chiefs	"What Time Is Love?" by the KLF "Golden Skans" by Klaxons "Time to Pretend" by MGMT	14 February 2006; 11 May 2007; 24 September 2008
Kaleem Taylor	"Thinkin Bout You" by Frank Ocean	18 January 2012
Kano	"Feel Good Inc." by Gorillaz "If I Ruled the World (Imagine That)" by Nas (feat. Lauryn Hill)	16 September 2005; 12 September 2016
Karol Conká	"Caxambu" by Almir Guineto	4 July 2014
Kasabian	"Out of Space" by the Prodigy "Somebody to Love" by Jefferson Airplane "The Sweet Escape" by Gwen Stefani "Video Games" by Lana Del Rey "Fancy" by Iggy Azalea	10 November 2004; 8 November 2006; 14 September 2009; 26 October 2011; 1 September 2014
Kate Nash	"Fluorescent Adolescent" by Arctic Monkeys "Seven Nation Army" by the White Stripes	5 October 2007; 11 February 2008
Katy B	"Let Me Go" by Maverick Sabre "My Love" by Kele Le Roc "One for the Road/What I Might Do" by Arctic Monkeys/Ben Pearce "Right Before My Eyes" by N'n'G	16 August 2011; 22 February 2013; 28 January 2014; 28 January 2014
Katy Perry	"Electric Feel" by MGMT "Paris" by Jay-Z & Kanye West	17 September 2008; 19 March 2012
Keane	"With or Without You" by U2 "Dirrtylicious" - "Dirrty/Bootylicious" by Christina Aguilera/Destiny's Child "Another One Bites the Dizzee" - "Another One Bites the Dust/Dance wiv Me" by Queen/Dizzee Rascal	24 November 2004; 2006; 8 October 2008
Kele	"Blah Blah Blah" by Kesha feat. 3OH!3	14 August 2010
Kelis	"In for the Kill" by La Roux	12 May 2010
Kelly Clarkson	"Princess of China" by Coldplay feat. Rihanna "Bitch Better Have My Money" by Rihanna	6 June 2012; 12 November 2015
Kelly Rowland	"Underdog" by Kasabian	1 July 2010
Kent Jones	"Work" by Rihanna feat. Drake	28 July 2016
Keri Hilson	"Supernova" by Mr Hudson (feat. Kanye West)	25 September 2009
Kesha	"Silence" by Marshmello (feat. Khalid)	15 November 2017
Khalid	"Fast Car" by Tracy Chapman	8 March 2018
Kid Ink	"Gin and Juice" by Snoop Dogg	7 February 2014
Kids in Glass Houses	"Hollywood" by Marina and the Diamonds	25 March 2010
Kiesza	"Nobody to Love/Doo Wop (That Thing)" by Sigma/Lauryn Hill "Prayer in C" by Lilly Wood and the Prick "La La La" by Naughty Boy feat. Sam Smith	14 April 2014; 9 September 2014; 25 November 2014
The Killers	"Fame" by David Bowie	13 September 2017
The King Blues	"Bonkers" by Dizzee Rascal and Armand Van Helden	5 May 2009
King Princess	"Au Pays du Cocaine" by Geese	26 January 2026
Kings of Leon	"Dancing On My Own" by Robyn "Hands to Myself" by Selena Gomez	10 Sep 2013; 19 October 2016
Klaxons	"My Love" by Justin Timberlake "Fairground" by Simply Red "Bad Romance" by Lady Gaga	24 January 2007; 15 February 2008; 21 October 2010
Kodaline	"Latch" by Disclosure (feat. Sam Smith) "Sing/Shake It Off/Uptown Funk" by Ed Sheeran/Taylor Swift/Mark Ronson (feat. Bruno Mars)	23 January 2013; 27 January 2015
KOF	"Thugz Mansion/Smells Like Teen Spirit" by 2Pac feat. Nas/Nirvana	13 September 2011
The Kooks	"Crazy" by Gnarls Barkley "Roxanne" by the Police "Violet Hill" by Coldplay "Pumped Up Kicks" by Foster the People "Right Here" by Gorgon City	30 March 2006; 8 February 2007; 3 July 2008; 6 September 2011; 17 June 2014
Kosheen	"Can't Get You Out of My Head" by Kylie Minogue	
KT Tunstall	"Get Ur Freak On" by Missy Elliott "The Prayer" by Bloc Party "Fake Plastic Trees" by Radiohead	3 May 2005; 22 August 2007
Kwabs	"Don't Leave Me" by Blackstreet "Dark Horse" by Katy Perry "Bloodstream" (with Stormzy) by Ed Sheeran and Rudimental	8 January 2014; 24 September 2014; 19 March 2015
Kygo	"Habits (Stay High)" by Tove Lo "Wildest Dreams" (with Ella Henderson) by Taylor Swift "Sign of the Times" (with Ellie Goulding) by Harry Styles	12 November 2015; 16 December 2015; 31 May 2017
Kylie Minogue	"Wonderful Life" by Hurts	29 September 2010

== L ==
Artist/group	Song(s)	Date(s)
La Roux	"Farewell to the Fairground" by White Lies	23 June 2009
Labrinth	"Beautiful People" by Chris Brown "No Church in the Wild" (with Devlin and Ed Sheeran) by Jay-Z and Kanye West (feat. Frank Ocean) "Shake It Off" by Taylor Swift "Am I Wrong" (with Sigma) by Nico & Vinz	20 October 2011; 21 August 2012; 20 September 2014; 24 March 2015
Lady Gaga	"Viva la Vida" by Coldplay	20 April 2009
Lady Sovereign	"Shake It" by Metro Station	15 April 2009
Ladyhawke	"Womanizer" by Britney Spears	8 December 2008
Lana Del Rey	"Goodbye Kiss" by Kasabian "Break Up With Your Girlfriend, I'm Bored" by Ariana Grande	20 April 2012; 9 September 2019
Låpsley	"Pillowtalk" by Zayn	3 March 2016
The Last Dinner Party	"One of Your Girls" by Troye Sivan "Naked in Manhattan" by Chappell Roan	6 February 2024; 13 October 2025
The Last Shadow Puppets	"SOS (Rescue Me)" by Rihanna	4 July 2008
Laufey	"Winter Wonderland" by Darlene Love	17 December 2024
Laura Mvula	"Human Nature" by Michael Jackson "Try" by Pink "Yellow" by Coldplay "Same Old Mistakes" by Tame Impala / Rihanna	27 February 2013; 26 September 2013; 14 February 2014; 19 May 2016
Lauv	"Used to Be Young" by Miley Cyrus	12 October 2023
Lee Ryan	"Best of You" by Foo Fighters	22 July 2005
Leigh-Anne	"Paint the Town Red" by Doja Cat	10 October 2023
Lemar	"Vertigo" by U2 "I Believe in a Thing Called Love" by The Darkness "Empire State of Mind (Part II)" by Alicia Keys	12 November 2004 3 February 2010
Lenka	"Jump in the Pool" by Friendly Fires	17 June 2009
Leona Lewis	"Run" by Snow Patrol (later released on the deluxe edition of her album) "Stop Crying Your Heart Out" by Oasis "Let the Sun Shine" by Labrinth "Better In Time/Man Down" by Leona Lewis/Rihanna	31 October 2007; 21 January 2010; 23 May 2011; 23 May 2011
Lethal Bizzle	"Wild Frontier" by the Prodigy	14 April 2015
Lewis Capaldi	"Shallow" by Lady Gaga and Bradley Cooper (Note: Appears on BBC Radio 1's Live Lounge: The Collection) "2002" by Anne-Marie "Yesterday" by the Beatles "Everytime" by Britney Spears "Still Into You" by Paramore	14 November 2018; 14 May 2019; 5 August 2019; 26 September 2022; 20 October 2025
Liam Payne	"The Middle" by Zedd, Maren Morris and Grey	10 May 2018
Lianne La Havas	"Little Talks" by Of Monsters and Men	20 September 2012
Lil' Chris	"SexyBack" by Justin Timberlake	29 September 2006
Lil Nas X	"Jolene" by Dolly Parton	21 September 2021
Lily Allen	"Naïve" by the Kooks "I'm Outta Time" by Oasis "Stronger Than Ever" by Raleigh Ritchie	3 July 2006; 2 December 2009; 15 July 2014
Little Boots	"Beat Again" by JLS	19 August 2009
Little Jackie	"Viva la Vida" by Coldplay	29 August 2008
Little Mix	"I Will Wait" by Mumford and Sons "Holy Grail/Counting Stars" by Jay-Z feat. Justin Timberlake/OneRepublic "Want To Want Me/I Wanna Dance with Somebody/Somebody" by Jason Derulo/Whitney Houston/Natalie La Rose "Falling" by Harry Styles	13 November 2012; 7 November 2013; 28 July 2015; 15 September 2020
Lizzo	"Butter" by BTS "Unholy" by Sam Smith and Kim Petras	23 September 2021; 14 February 2023
Lola Young	"Manchild" by Sabrina Carpenter	16 September 2025
London Grammar	"In for the Kill" by La Roux "Wrecking Ball" by Miley Cyrus "Pure Shores" by All Saints "All Night" by Beyoncé "Purple Rain" by Prince and The Revolution	8 September 2013; 12 December 2013; 13 February 2014; 13 June 2017; 12 September 2017
Lonely the Brave	"Time After Time" by Cyndi Lauper	14 September 2014
Lorde	"Don't Tell 'Em" by Jeremih (feat. YG) "In the Air Tonight" by Phil Collins	13 November 2014; 28 September 2017
Lostprophets	"Cry Me a River" by Justin Timberlake "Boys Don't Cry" by the Cure "Going Underground" by the Jam "Empire State of Mind" (with LMFAO) by Jay-Z (feat. Alicia Keys) "Earthquake" by Labrinth (feat. Tinie Tempah)	February 2004; 30 November 2006; 22 January 2010; 22 May 2012
Louis Tomlinson	"Too Sweet" by Hozier	29 October 2025
Louisa Johnson	"Work From Home/Gotta Get Thru This" (with Clean Bandit) by Fifth Harmony (feat. Ty Dolla Sign)/Daniel Bedingfield "Rockabye" by Clean Bandit (feat. Sean Paul and Anne-Marie)	5 September 2016; 1 December 2016
Lower Than Atlantis	"Am I Wrong" by Nico & Vinz "I Would Like" by Zara Larsson	28 September 2014; 7 February 2017
Lukas Graham	"Love Yourself" by Justin Bieber	9 March 2016

== M ==
Artist/group	Song(s)	Date(s)
M.I.A.	"Everyday I Love You Less and Less" by Kaiser Chiefs	6 September 2005
M.O	"September Song" by JP Cooper	28 February 2017
Mabel	"Fix You" by Coldplay "Find U Again" by Mark Ronson featuring Camila Cabello "Overpass Graffiti" by Ed Sheeran	6 March 2018; 7 August 2019; 5 July 2022
Mac Miller	"Thugz Mansion" by 2Pac	24 May 2012
The Maccabees	"Boom Boom Pow" by the Black Eyed Peas "Lonely Boy" by the Black Keys "Lean On" by Major Lazer and DJ Snake (feat. MØ) "Hello" by Adele	8 July 2009; 15 March 2012; 14 May 2015; 16 November 2015
Machel Montano	"Waiting in Vain" by Bob Marley	19 August 2011
Machine Gun Kelly	"Say You Won't Let Go" (with Camila Cabello) by James Arthur "Feel Good Inc." by Gorillaz	31 January 2017; 6 October 2025
Madison Beer	"Glimpse of Us" by Joji	5 October 2023
Maggie Rogers	"Greedy" by Tate McRae	4 April 2024
The Magic Numbers	"Take Me Out" by Franz Ferdinand "Over and Over" by Hot Chip "Crazy in Love" by Beyoncé "There Is a Light That Never Goes Out" by the Smiths	6 February 2006; 25 October 2006
Magnetic Man	"Whip My Hair" by Willow Smith	22 February 2011
Maisie Peters	"Christmas Lights" by Coldplay	10 December 2025
Mallory Knox	"Try" by Pink "Lovers on the Sun" by David Guetta (feat. Sam Martin) "Heroes (We Could Be)" by Alesso (feat. Tove Lo)	9 June 2013; 7 September 2014; 2 April 2015
Mann	"This is How We Do It" by Montell Jordan	15 July 2011
Marilyn Manson	"What Goes Around... Comes Around" by Justin Timberlake	23 May 2007
Marina and the Diamonds	"Starstrukk" by 3OH!3 "Perfect Stranger" by Magnetic Man (feat. Katy B) "Boyfriend" by Justin Bieber	23 April 2010; 16 October 2010; 18 April 2012
Mario	"She Will Be Loved" by Maroon 5	
Mark Ronson	"Golden Skans" by Klaxons "Wonderful Christmastime" (feat. Daniel Merriweather) by Paul McCartney "Try Sleeping With A Broken Heart" (feat. MNDR and Q-Tip) by Alicia Keys "We Used to Wait" (feat. Kyle Falconer and Alex Greenwald) by Arcade Fire "The Giver by Duke Dumont	15 December 2008; 15 December 2008; 17 July 2010; 18 October 2010
Marmaduke Duke	"Single Ladies (Put a Ring on It)" by Beyoncé	22 April 2009
Marmozets	"Locked Out of Heaven" by Bruno Mars	21 September 2014
Maroon 5	"If I Ain't Got You/Don't Look Back in Anger" by Alicia Keys/Oasis "So Lonely/Don't Matter" by the Police/Akon "Happy" by Pharrell Williams	15 October 2004; 4 May 2007; 11 September 2014
Marshmello	"Eastside" (with Bastille) by Benny Blanco, Halsey and Khalid	6 November 2018
Martin Garrix	"Heathens" (with Bebe Rexha) by Twenty One Pilots	28 September 2016
Matrix and Futurebound	"Crying for No Reason" by Katy B	3 July 2014
Matt Willis	"All These Things That I've Done" by the Killers	22 May 2006
Maverick Sabre	"Wonderwall" by Oasis "A Change Is Gonna Come" by Sam Cooke "Video Games/Heaven" by Lana Del Rey/Emeli Sandé "Beautiful Girls" by Sean Kingston	17 March 2011; 1 August 2011; 7 February 2012; 20 June 2012
Maxïmo Park	"Shiver" by Natalie Imbruglia "I'm Gonna Be (500 Miles)" by the Proclaimers "Just Dance" by Lady Gaga (feat. Colby O'Donis)	20 July 2005; 4 April 2007; 6 May 2009
McFly	"I Predict a Riot" by Kaiser Chiefs "Happy Xmas (War Is Over)" by John Lennon "Born to Run" by Bruce Springsteen "I Kissed a Girl" by Katy Perry "Dynamite" by Taio Cruz	26 October 2005; 20 December 2006; 10 December 2007; 10 September 2008; 10 September 2010
Meghan Trainor	"Don't Stop" by 5 Seconds of Summer	20 January 2015
Melissa Steel	"American Boy" (with Krishane) by Estelle (feat. Kanye West)	27 September 2014
Meridian Dan	"Blinded by the Lights" by the Streets	19 March 2014
Metro Station	"Dead and Gone" by T.I. (feat. Justin Timberlake)	23 March 2009
Mic Righteous	"The Power of Love" (Gabrielle Aplin version) by Frankie Goes to Hollywood	8 January 2013
Michael Kiwanuka	"Somebody That I Used to Know" by Gotye (feat. Kimbra) "Into You" by Ariana Grande "I Had Some Help" by Post Malone (feat. Morgan Wallen) "Happy Xmas (War Is Over)" by John Lennon	12 March 2012; 21 September 2016; 28 October 2024; 5 December 2024
Miike Snow	"In for the Kill" by La Roux	30 January 2010
Mika	"Same Jeans/Brimful of Asha/Walking in Memphis" by The View/Cornershop/Marc Cohn "Teardrop" by Massive Attack "Poker Face" by Lady Gaga	31 January 2007; 13 April 2008; 28 September 2009
Mikky Ekko	"Chained" by the xx	4 January 2013
Miles Kane	"Heaven" by Emeli Sandé	20 September 2011
Miley Cyrus	"Summertime Sadness" by Lana Del Rey "The First Time Ever I Saw Your Face" by Roberta Flack "No Tears Left To Cry" (With Mark Ronson) by Ariana Grande "My Future" by Billie Eilish "Take It To The Limit" by The Eagles	12 November 2013; 15 September 2017 18 December 2018 1 September 2020 1 September 2020
Milky Chance	"Take Me to Church" by Hozier	3 February 2015
Mimi Webb	"Anti-Hero" by Taylor Swift	7 March 2023
Mini Viva	"Heartbeat" by Nneka	9 September 2009
Mis-Teeq	"Clint Eastwood" by Gorillaz "21 Seconds" by So Solid Crew	
Misha B	"Beneath Your Beautiful" by Labrinth (feat. Emeli Sandé)	29 October 2012
Mista Silva	"Ms. Jackson/Blinded by the Lights" by Outkast/The Streets	26 March 2014
MNEK	"Runnin' (Lose It All)" (with Zara Larsson) by Naughty Boy (feat. Beyoncé and Arrow Benjamin) "Tears" by Clean Bandit (feat. Louisa Johnson)	16 December 2015; 5 July 2016
MØ	"Love on the Brain" by Rihanna	17 November 2016
Modestep	"Paradise" by Coldplay	8 November 2011
Mr Hudson	"Beat Again" by JLS	10 October 2009
Ms. Dynamite	"Don't Go" by Wretch 32	31 August 2011
MS MR	"Do I Wanna Know?" by Arctic Monkeys	20 August 2013
Mumford and Sons	"I'm Not Alone" by Calvin Harris "Cousins" by Vampire Weekend "Tessellate" by Alt-J "2Shy" by Shura "Breathin" by Ariana Grande "I Love You, I'm Sorry" by Gracie Abrams	3 October 2009; 1 March 2010; 25 September 2012; 29 April 2015; 3 October 2009; 27 October 2025
Mura Masa	"Controlla" by Drake "Passionfruit" (feat. Tom Tripp) by Drake	12 May 2016; 11 May 2017
Muse	"Sign o' the Times" by Prince "Lies" by Chvrches	28 September 2012; 11 September 2015
Mutya Buena	"Worried About Ray" by the Hoosiers	10 October 2007
My Chemical Romance	"Song 2" by Blur "Common People" by Pulp	7 November 2005; 31 March 2011
Myles Smith	"Exile" by Taylor Swift (feat. Bon Iver)	3 October 2025
Mylo	"Sweet Child o' Mine" by Guns N' Roses	16 May 2005
The Mysterines	"Lonely This Christmas" by Mud	8 December 2022
Mystery Jets	"Bleeding Love" by Leona Lewis	11 June 2008
Mz Bratt	"Go" by Delilah	26 October 2011

== N ==
Artist/group	Song(s)	Date(s)
N-Dubz	"Dancing Choose" by TV on the Radio "About You Now/With You" by Sugababes/Chris Brown "The Man Who Can't Be Moved/Breakeven" both by the Script "Down/Meet Me Halfway" by the Black Eyed Peas/Jay Sean	19 November 2008; 12 November 2009; 8 May 2010
Naughty Boy	"Get Lucky" (feat. Tanika) by Daft Punk feat. Pharrell Williams "Sonnentanz (Sun Don't Shine)" (feat. Chasing Grace) by Klangkarussell "Shape of You/No Diggity/Let Me Blow Ya Mind" by Ed Sheeran/Blackstreet (feat. Dr. Dre)/Eve (feat. Gwen Stefani)	17 May 2013; 12 September 2013; 19 January 2017
Natasha Bedingfield	"Somewhere Only We Know" by Keane "The Scientist" by Coldplay "Chasing Cars" by Snow Patrol "Ray of Light" by Madonna	4 February 2005; May 2004; 16 March 2007; 19 September 2007
Ne-Yo	"Sometimes You Can't Make It on Your Own" by U2 "Take a Bow" by Rihanna	16 March 2006; 24 July 2008
Neiked	"Closer" by the Chainsmokers (feat. Halsey)	10 November 2016
Nelly Furtado	"Crazy" by Gnarls Barkley	31 May 2006
Neon Jungle	"Jungle" by X Ambassadors & Jamie N Commons feat. Jay-Z	24 July 2014
Nero	"Live Those Days Tonight" by Friendly Fires	3 August 2011
Newton Faulkner	"Foundations" by Kate Nash "Mama Do (Uh Oh Uh Oh)" by Pixie Lott "Payphone" by Maroon 5 feat. Wiz Khalifa	19 October 2007; 26 September 2009; 4 July 2012
Niall Horan	"Issues" by Julia Michaels "Ceilings" by Lizzy McAlpine	8 June 2017; 18 April 2023
Nick Mulvey	"We Are Never Ever Getting Back Together" by Taylor Swift "Hold On, We're Going Home" by Drake	15 May 2014; 12 September 2014
Nick Jonas	"King" by Years & Years "Lush Life" by Zara Larsson	10 April 2015; 26 May 2016
Nickelback	"Gallery" by Tellison "Stop and Stare" by OneRepublic	20 May 2009
Nina Nesbitt	"Chocolate" by the 1975 "Love Me Again" by John Newman	27 March 2013; 21 July 2013
Noah and the Whale	"Call Your Girlfriend" by Robyn "Paradise" by Coldplay	10 August 2011; 24 October 2011
Noah Kahan	"Lacy" by Olivia Rodrigo "Rein Me In" by Sam Fender and Olivia Dean	23 November 2023; 24 March 2026
Noisettes	"When You Were Young" by the Killers	25 March 2009
Nothing but Thieves	"Believe" by Mumford & Sons" "In My Blood" by Shawn Mendes "Dance the Night" by Dua Lipa "Crazy in Love" by Beyoncé feat. Jay-Z	30 November 2015; 16 October 2018; 11 July 2023; 7 October 2026

== O ==
Artist/group	Song(s)	Date(s)
Odeal	"They Don't Know" by Jon B	23 October 2026
Oh Wonder	"Crazy in Love" by Beyoncé feat. Jay-Z	21 March 2016
Olivia Dean	"Cuff It" by Beyoncé "Love Me Not" by Ravyn Lenae	24 October 2023; 29 September 2025
Olivia Rodrigo	"Stick Season" by Noah Kahan "When a Good Man Cries" by CMAT	2 October 2023; 2 June 2026
Olly Murs	"Without You" by David Guetta feat. Usher "I Wish It Could Be Christmas Everyday" by Wizzard "Don't You Worry Child" by Swedish House Mafia "Changing" by Sigma feat. Paloma Faith "Last Christmas" by Wham! "Can't Stop the Feeling/Rock Your Body" by Justin Timberlake "Christmas (Baby Please Come Home)" by Darlene Love "Lonely This Christmas" by Mud	22 November 2011; 21 December 2012; 7 March 2013; 1 December 2014; 1 December 2014; 7 September 2016; 9 December 2016; 9 December 2016
One Direction	"FourFiveSeconds" by Rihanna, Kanye West and Sir Paul McCartney "Torn" by Natalie Imbruglia	12 November 2015; 12 November 2015
OneRepublic	"Mercy" by Duffy "Love Me Again" by John Newman "Budapest" by George Ezra "Send My Love (To Your New Lover)" by Adele	5 March 2008; 5 December 2013; 21 October 2014; 2 September 2016
The Ordinary Boys	"All the Things She Said" by t.A.T.u. "Girls Just Want to Have Fun" by Cyndi Lauper	15 July 2004; 29 November 2006
Orson	"Push the Button" by Sugababes	10 May 2006

== P ==
Artist/group	Song(s)	Date(s)
Pale Waves	"One Kiss" by Calvin Harris and Dua Lipa "Boyfriend" by Dove Cameron	18 September 2018; 22 November 2022
Paloma Faith	"Sexy Chick" by David Guetta feat. Akon "Fairytale of New York" (feat. Roy Stride) by the Pogues feat. Kirsty MacColl "Feel the Love" by Rudimental feat. John Newman	29 September 2009; 19 December 2009; 18 June 2012
Panic! at the Disco	"Maneater" by Nelly Furtado "Valerie" by the Zutons "Starboy" by the Weeknd feat Daft Punk "IDGAF" by Dua Lipa	3 December 2006; 28 March 2008; 21 November 2016; 29 May 2018
Paolo Nutini	"Rehab" by Amy Winehouse "Time to Pretend" by MGMT "Recover" by Chvrches "Ever Fallen in Love (With Someone You Shouldn't've)" by Buzzcocks	6 December 2006; 6 November 2009; 17 April 2014; 8 September 2014
Paramore	"Love's Not a Competition (But I'm Winning)" by Kaiser Chiefs "Use Somebody" by Kings of Leon "Matilda" by Alt-J "Passionfruit" by Drake	1 February 2008; 4 September 2009; 3 April 2013; 19 June 2017
Peace	"Locked Out of Heaven/Message in a Bottle" by Bruno Mars/The Police "White Noise" by Disclosure feat. AlunaGeorge	23 March 2013; 17 June 2013
Pendulum	"Violet Hill" by Coldplay "The Catalyst" by Linkin Park	30 July 2008; 22 September 2010
Perrie	"Die with a Smile" by Lady Gaga and Bruno Mars	18 October 2024
Phoebe Bridgers	"Lithium" by Nirvana	19 August 2026
The Pigeon Detectives	"Girlfriend" by Avril Lavigne "Ready for the Floor" by Hot Chip	15 August 2007; 30 May 2008
Pink	"Girl on Fire" by Alicia Keys "Stay with Me" by Sam Smith	5 December 2012; 8 September 2017
PinkPantheress	"Apple" by Charli XCX	8 October 2025
Pixie Lott	"When Love Takes Over" by David Guetta feat. Kelly Rowland "Forget You" by CeeLo Green "Dedication to My Ex (Miss That)" by Lloyd feat. André 3000 and Lil Wayne	19 November 2009; 9 October 2010; 31 January 2012
Plain White T's	"The Day That Never Comes" by Metallica	7 December 2010
Plan B	"Pass Out" by Tinie Tempah "Acapella" by Kelis "In the Bleak Midwinter"; Feel It Still by Portugal. The Man	31 March 2010; 26 June 2010 (at Glastonbury); 18 December 2010; 24 April 2018
The Pretty Reckless	"Islands/Love the Way You Lie" by the xx/Eminem feat. Rihanna "My Songs Know What You Did in the Dark (Light Em Up)" by Fall Out Boy "Champagne Supernova" by Oasis	23 August 2010; 23 March 2014; 14 June 2014
Professor Green	"Billionaire" by Travie McCoy feat. Bruno Mars "What Do You Take Me For?" by Pixie Lott "Hometown Glory" by Adele "Don't" by Ed Sheeran	20 July 2010; 31 October 2011; 1 June 2012; 17 September 2014
Pulled Apart by Horses	"Whip My Hair/Whip It" by Willow Smith/Devo "Blue Jeans" by Lana Del Rey "Team" by Lorde	4 December 2010; 24 April 2012; 9 June 2014
Purple Ferdinand	"No Love" by Little Dragon	10 January 2013

== Q ==
Artist/group	Song(s)	Date(s)
Queens of the Stone Age	"Blurred Lines" by Robin Thicke feat. T.I. and Pharrell Williams "Why'd You Only Call Me When You're High?" by Arctic Monkeys "Do I Wanna Know?" by Arctic Monkeys	10 June 2013; 5 September 2013; 5 September 2013

== R ==
Artist/group	Song(s)	Date(s)
R.E.M.	"Munich" by Editors	26 March 2008
Rachel Chinouriri	"Starburster" by Fontaines D.C. "Brand New Chanels" by Slayyyter	16 October 2024; 21 October 2026
Rae Morris	"Stay Another Day" by East 17 "Rockstar/Havana" by Post Malone (feat. 21 Savage)/Camila Cabello (feat. Young Thug)	2 December 2014; 2 November 2017
Rag'n'Bone Man	"Freedom" by Beyoncé "Gimme Shelter" by the Rolling Stones "It's Beginning to Look a Lot Like Christmas" by Meredith Willson	13 February 2017; 21 September 2017; 15 December 2017
Raleigh Ritchie	"Millionaire" by Kelis	4 March 2015
Ravyn Lenae	"Please Please Please" by Sabrina Carpenter	8 July 2025
Raye	"Phases" (with Alma) by Alma feat. French Montana "Running Up That Hill" by Kate Bush	21 November 2017; 7 September 2022
Ray Foxx	"Thinking of You" by Sister Sledge	12 August 2013
Razorlight	"Hey Ya!" by Outkast "No One Knows" by Queens of the Stone Age	7 June 2004; 26 September 2008
Red Light Company	"Paper Planes" by M.I.A.	2 March 2009
Reneé Rapp	"Good Days" by SZA	17 October 2025
Reverend and the Makers	"Trick Me" by Kelis	30 May 2007
Rita Ora	"Somebody That I Used to Know" by Gotye feat. Kimbra "No Church in the Wild" by Jay-Z and Kanye West feat. Frank Ocean "What Makes You Beautiful" by One Direction "Lover of the Light" by Mumford and Sons "Like a Virgin/Goosebumps" by Madonna/Travis Scott (feat. Kendrick Lamar) "Last Christmas" by Wham! "Attention/American Boy" by Charlie Puth/Estelle (feat. Kanye West)	13 February 2012; 8 June 2012; 10 August 2012; 15 February 2013; 18 September 2017; 11 December 2017; 19 November 2018
Rizzle Kicks	"Santa Claus Is Coming to Town" by John Frederick Coots "Summertime Sadness" by Lana Del Rey "Fancy/Sing" by Iggy Azalea (feat. Charli XCX)/Ed Sheeran	16 December 2011; 6 September 2013; 7 August 2014
Robbie Williams	"Human" by the Killers "Shine" (feat. Gary Barlow) by Take That "Chaise Longue" by Wet Leg	11 November 2009; 7 October 2010; 10 October 2025
Robin Thicke	"I Love It" by Icona Pop	8 July 2013
Robyn	"Since U Been Gone" by Kelly Clarkson "Try Sleeping with a Broken Heart" by Alicia Keys "Every Teardrop Is a Waterfall" by Coldplay	8 August 2007; 16 June 2010; 26 July 2011
Role Model	"Maggots for Brains" by Olivia Rodrigo	11 August 2026
Roll Deep	"Airplanes" by B.o.B (feat. Hayley Williams)	17 August 2010
Roni Size & Dynamite MC	"Drop It Like It's Hot" by Snoop Dogg	2005
Rosé	"Last Christmas" by Wham!	3 December 2024
Royal Blood	"Ace of Spades" by Motörhead "Happy" by Pharrell Williams "Roxanne" by the Police "My Sharona" by the Knack "Eat Your Young" by Hozier "Dark Red" by Steve Lacy	13 June 2014; 6 November 2014; 18 February 2015; 26 September 2017; 20 June 202430 October 2026
Royel Otis	"Let Me Love You" by Mario	20 August 2025
Rudimental	"Harlem Shake" by Baauer "Now" (with Ella Eyre) by Paramore "The Monster/Story of My Life" by Eminem (feat. Rihanna)/One Direction "Body on Me" by Rita Ora (feat. Chris Brown) "Teardrops/Move On Up" (with Bridget) by Womack & Womack/Curtis Mayfield "The Sky Is a Neighborhood/God's Plan" by Foo Fighters/Drake	22 February 2013; 17 April 2013; 21 November 2013; 18 September 2015; 27 September 2017; 1 March 2018

== S ==
Artist/group	Song(s)	Date(s)
Sbtrkt	"Blue Cassette" by Friendly Fires	6 January 2012
Sabrina Carpenter	"Good Luck, Babe!" by Chappell Roan	18 June 2024
Samara Cyn	"Millionaire" by Kelis feat. André 3000	7 June 2026
Sampha	"Controlla" by Drake "Get Lucky" by Daft Punk ft. Pharrell Williams "Bad Habit" by Steve Lacy	28 March 2017; 13 February 2018; 16 October 2023
Sam and the Womp	"We'll Be Coming Back" by Calvin Harris feat. Example	22 August 2012
Sam Fender	"Break Up with Your Girlfriend, I'm Bored" by Ariana Grande "Dancing with a Stranger" by Sam Smith and Normani "Back to Black" by Amy Winehouse	26 February 2019; 18 September 2019; 13 February 2020
Sam Smith	"Need U (100%)" (with Disclosure) by Duke Dumont (feat. A*M*E) "When I Was Your Man" by Bruno Mars "Berlin" by RY X "Fast Car" by Tracy Chapman "Hotline Bling" (with Disclosure) by Drake "Try Sleeping with a Broken Heart" by Alicia Keys "Father Figure" by George Michael "Have Yourself a Merry Little Christmas" by Judy Garland "Head & Heart by Joel Corry and MNEK "Seventeen Going Under" by Sam Fender "The Fear" by Lily Allen	5 June 2013; 21 September 2013; 10 January 2014; 3 September 2014; 18 November 2015; 29 September 2017; 29 September 2017; 13 December 2017; 27 October 2020; 22 September 2022; 9 October 2026
Sam Sparro	"American Boy" by Estelle	11 April 2008
Santogold	"Hometown Glory" by Adele	18 July 2008
The Saturdays	"Beggin'" by Madcon "Winter Wonderland" by Bing Crosby "Just the Way You Are" by Bruno Mars "I Need a Dollar/Buzzin'" by Aloe Blacc/Mann "Hold On, We're Going Home" by Drake feat. Majid Jordan	30 October 2008; 17 December 2009; 29 October 2010; 21 June 2011; 22 October 2013
Scissor Sisters	"Take Me Out" by Franz Ferdinand (Note: Appears on Scissor Sisters' "Mary") "Dare" by Gorillaz "Crazy" by Gnarls Barkley "All the Lovers" by Kylie Minogue	16 June 2004; 15 September 2006 22 June 2010
Scott Matthews	"Seven Nation Army" by the White Stripes	21 September 2006
Scouting for Girls	"2 Hearts/Ms. Jackson" by Kylie Minogue/OutKast "A Million Love Songs" by Take That "Don't Stop Believin'" by Journey "Skinny Love" by Bon Iver "Wings" by Little Mix	28 November 2007; 9 February 2009; 13 April 2010; 13 July 2011; 30 August 2012
The Script	"Lose Yourself" by Eminem "Times Like These" by Foo Fighters "Written in the Stars" by Tinie Tempah "Anything Could Happen" by Ellie Goulding "Heroes" by David Bowie "Chandelier" by Sia "Changes" by 2Pac	28 July 2008; 7 May 2009; 17 November 2010; 27 November 2012; 7 June 2013; 2 September 2014; 5 September 2017
Sekou	"Yukon" by Justin Bieber	3 March 2026
Self Esteem	"Starburster" by Fontaines D.C.	14 May 2025
Selena Gomez	"Rude" by Magic!	17 November 2015
Shakka	"Walking with Elephants" by Ten Walls	15 April 2015
Shawn Mendes	"Here" by Alessia Cara "Fake Love" by Drake "Psycho" by Post Malone (feat. Ty Dolla Sign) "Can't Take My Eyes Off You" by Frankie Valli "Happier Than Ever" by Billie Eilish	2 February 2016; 6 December 2016; 18 April 2018; 10 November 2020; 14 September 2021
Shontelle	"Red" (feat. Akon) by Daniel Merriweather	8 June 2009
Sienna Spiro	"Back to Friends" by Sombr "Less" by Olivia Rodrigo	17 December 2025; 7 July 2026
Sigala	"See You Again" (with Craig David) by Wiz Khalifa (feat. Charlie Puth) "I Feel It Coming" by the Weeknd feat. Daft Punk	5 September 2015; 26 January 2017
Sigma	"Am I Wrong" (with Labrinth) by Nico & Vinz	24 March 2015
Sigrid	"Anything Could Happen" by Ellie Goulding	12 January 2018
Simon Webbe	"When You Were Young" by the Killers	17 November 2006
Sinéad Harnett	"Wish I Didn't Miss You" (with Omar) by Angie Stone	17 June 2015
Skepta	"All of the Lights" by Kanye West	29 January 2011
Skye Newman	"The Hardest Part" by Olivia Dean	15 October 2025
Slaves	"Go" "Last Christmas" "Shutdown" by Skepta "The Hills" by the Weeknd "Everybody Wants to Be Famous" by Superorganism	18 November 2015; 15 December 2015; 18 December 2015; 5 October 2016; 11 September 2018
Snakehips	"Redbone" (with MØ) by Childish Gambino	9 March 2017
Snow Patrol	"Just Like Christmas" by Low "One Day Like This" by Elbow "Ray of Light" by Madonna "Last Friday Night (T.G.I.F.)" by Katy Perry	15 December 2004; 23 September 2008; 30 October 2009; 14 November 2011
Soak	"Drown" by Bring Me the Horizon	5 March 2015
Sohn	"Say Something" by A Great Big World feat. Christina Aguilera	5 March 2014
Sombr	"Ribs" by Lorde	3 June 2025
Sophie Ellis-Bextor	"Nothing Matters" by the Last Dinner Party	20 February 2024
Starsailor	"Push the Button" by Sugababes (Note: Appears on Starsailor's "This Time") "Don't Stop Movin'" by S Club 7	5 October 2005; 20 February 2002
Stella Lefty	"I Knew It, I Knew You" by Taylor Swift	12 October 2026
Stereophonics	"Ooh La La" by Goldfrapp (Note: Appears on Stereophonics's "Rewind") "You Sexy Thing" by Hot Chocolate "Best of You" by Foo Fighters	14 December 2007
Stooshe	"Only Love" by Ben Howard	11 June 2012
Stormzy	Bloodstream" (with Kwabs) by Ed Sheeran and Rudimental "Ultralight Beam" by Kanye West "Sweet like Chocolate" by Shanks & Bigfoot "Brown Skin Girl" by Beyoncé	19 March 2015; 17 February 2017; 14 September 2017; 23 September 2019
Stornoway	"Wearing My Rolex" by Wiley	15 May 2010
Sugababes	"Living for the Weekend" by Hard-Fi "Hey There Delilah" by Plain White T's "Spiralling" by Keane "Rabbit Heart (Raise It Up)" by Florence and the Machine "What Was That?" by Lorde	14 March 2006; 3 October 2007; 9 October 2008; 10 November 2009; 15 May 2025
Suli Breaks	"No Woman, No Cry" by Bob Marley and the Wailers	4 October 2013
Sundara Karma	"24K Magic" by Bruno Mars	12 January 2017

== T ==
Artist/group	Song(s)	Date(s)
Taio Cruz	"This Is an Emergency" by the Pigeon Detectives "Little Lion Man" by Mumford & Sons "Hold It Against Me" by Britney Spears	28 May 2008; 12 October 2009; 18 February 2011
Take That	"Everyday I Love You Less and Less" by Kaiser Chiefs	20 November 2006
Tate McRae	"The One That Got Away" by Katy Perry	9 November 2022
Taylor Swift	"White Blank Page" by Mumford and Sons "Riptide" by Vance Joy "Can't Stop Loving You" by Phil Collins	5 April 2011; 9 October 2014; 2 September 2019
Tali	"21 Questions" by 50 Cent	5 May 2004
Teddy Swims	"Cruel Summer" by Taylor Swift	11 January 2024
The Temper Trap	"In for the Kill" by La Roux	15 December 2009
Theme Park	"Thrift Shop" by Macklemore and Ryan Lewis feat. Wanz	25 February 2013
Thirty Seconds to Mars	"Stronger" by Kanye West "Bad Romance" by Lady Gaga (Note: Appears on the deluxe edition of Thirty Seconds to Mars' album This Is War) "Stay" by Rihanna (Note: Appears on BBC Radio 1's Live Lounge 2013) "Purple Rain/"Heroes"/Freedom! '90/Crawling/Black Hole Sun" by Prince and The Revolution/David Bowie/George Michael/Linkin Park/Soundgarden "Lucid Dreams/Love Lies/Better Now" by Juice Wrld/Khalid and Normani/Post Malone	14 September 2007; 29 March 2010; 17 September 2013; 7 September 2017; 10 September 2018
The Thrills	"Like a Virgin" by Madonna	September 2004
Tinchy Stryder	"The Fear" by Lily Allen "Sweet Dreams/Beat Again" (feat. Amelle) by Beyoncé/JLS "Bodies" by Robbie Williams "Kickstarts" by Example	19 January 2009; 7 August 2009; 31 October 2009; 11 August 2010
The Ting Tings	"Standing in the Way of Control/The Power" by Gossip/Snap! "Santa Baby" by Eartha Kitt "Born to Die" by Lana Del Rey	7 July 2008; 16 December 2008; 29 February 2012
Tinie Tempah	"Uprising" by Muse "Ready for Your Love" by Gorgon City feat. MNEK "German Whip" by Meridian Dan feat. Big H and JME	9 June 2010; 4 February 2014; 4 February 2014
Tom Grennan	"God Is a Woman" by Ariana Grande "B.O.T.A. (Baddest of Them All)" by Eliza Rose and Interplanetary Criminal "Angel of My Dreams"/"Favourite" by Jade/Fontaines D.C.	2 October 2018; 6 October 2022; 21 October 2024
Tom Odell	"Roar" by Katy Perry "I Took a Pill in Ibiza" by Mike Posner "The Sound" by the 1975 "Undressed" by Sombr	3 December 2013; 18 May 2016; 29 September 2016; 9 September 2025
Tove Lo	"See You Again" by Wiz Khalifa feat Charlie Puth "Life Itself" by Glass Animals	30 April 2015; 8 November 2016
Travie McCoy	"The Cave" by Mumford and Sons	27 July 2010
Travis	"...Baby One More Time" by Britney Spears	
Troye Sivan	"What Was I Made For?" by Billie Eilish	3 October 2023
True Tiger	"I Need a Dollar" (feat. Professor Green and Maverick Sabre) by Aloe Blacc	23 May 2011
Tulisa	"Titanium" by David Guetta feat. Sia	1 May 2012
Turin Brakes	"No Scrubs" by TLC	
Turnstile	"Burning Fight" by Inside Out	12 May 2026
The Twang	"Mary" by Scissor Sisters	14 May 2007
Twenty One Pilots	"9 Crimes" by Damien Rice	1 November 2018
Twin Atlantic	"Who You Are" by Jessie J "Chandelier" by Sia "Crash" by Usher "Waste a Moment" by Kings of Leon	11 January 2012; 5 August 2014; 26 September 2016; 5 January 2017
Two Door Cinema Club	"The Cave" by Mumford and Sons "Treasure" by Bruno Mars "The Greatest" by Sia "Bad Guy" by Billie Eilish	4 May 2011; 3 June 2013; 18 October 2016; 11 June 2019

== U ==
Artist/group	Song(s)	Date(s)
Usher	"Pumped Up Kicks" by Foster the People "Don't Let Me Down" by the Chainsmokers feat. Daya "Best Part" by Daniel Caesar feat. H.E.R.	14 June 2012; 5 September 2016; 23 October 2023

== V ==
Artist/group	Song(s)	Date(s)
The Vaccines	"Last Friday Night (T.G.I.F.)" by Katy Perry "We Are Never Ever Getting Back Together" by Taylor Swift	23 August 2011; 3 September 2012
Vampire Weekend	"Fight for this Love" by Cheryl Cole "Blurred Lines" by Robin Thicke feat. T.I. and Pharrell Williams	16 December 2010; 19 July 2013
The Vamps	"Trumpets" by Jason Derulo "That's My Girl" by Fifth Harmony "Shotgun" by George Ezra	10 April 2014; 29 November 2016; 14 August 2018
Vant	"Chained to the Rhythm" by Katy Perry feat. Skip Marley	23 February 2017
The View	"Rewind" by Paolo Nutini	17 January 2007
The Veronicas	"Uprising" by Muse	21 September 2009
Villagers	"Back for Good" by Take That "Lonely Boy" by the Black Keys	5 March 2011; 14 January 2013

== W ==
Artist/group	Song(s)	Date(s)
The Wanted	"For the First Time" by the Script "Animal" by Neon Trees "White Christmas" by Bing Crosby	25 October 2010; 16 March 2011; 14 December 2011
We Are Scientists	"Hoppípolla" by Sigur Rós (Note: Appears on We Are Scientists's Crap Attack) "Rockstar" by Nickelback	4 May 2006; 29 February 2008
We Are the Ocean	"Hey Now" by London Grammar	27 November 2014
Wet Leg	"Walking on a Dream" by Empire of the Sun	24 October 2025
White Lies	"Love Lockdown" by Kanye West	14 January 2009
Wilkinson	"Counting Stars" by OneRepublic "Ready for Your Love" (feat. Detour City) by Gorgon City feat. MNEK	17 October 2013; 24 February 2014
Will Young	"Hey Ya!" by OutKast "Don't Cha" by the Pussycat Dolls	15 March 2004; 11 January 2006
Willy Mason	"The Message" by Grandmaster Flash	25 February 2005
Wizkid	"No Woman, No Cry" by Bob Marley and the Wailers	24 March 2014
Wolf Alice	"Desire" by Years & Years "Steal My Girl" by One Direction "Matilda" by Alt-J "Good Riddance (Time of Your Life)" by Green Day "Never Be the Same" by Camila Cabello "Nice to Each Other" by Olivia Dean	23 June 2015; 18 November 2015; 18 November 2015; 19 September 2017; 15 May 2018; 27 August 2025
The Wombats	"Patience" by Take That "Frosty the Snowman" "Price Tag" by Jessie J "I Really Like You" by Carly Rae Jepsen	9 January 2008; 18 December 2008; 11 April 2011; 16 April 2015
Wretch 32	"Someone Like You" by Adele "Thinking Out Loud" by Ed Sheeran "Good Kisser" by Usher	19 April 2011; 20 November 2014; 20 November 2014

== X ==
Artist/group	Song(s)	Date(s)
The xx	"Last Christmas" by Wham! "Finally" by Kings of Tomorrow "My Love/LoveStoned" by Justin Timberlake	17 December 2012; 5 March 2013; 6 September 2017

== Y ==
Artist/group	Song(s)	Date(s)
Years & Years	"Don't Save Me" by HAIM "Earned It" by the Weeknd "No Tears Left to Cry" by Ariana Grande	9 January 2015; 18 November 2015; 12 July 2018
You Me at Six	"Poker Face" by Lady Gaga "Starry Eyed" by Ellie Goulding "Domino" by Jessie J "Wake Me Up" by Avicii "Magic" by Coldplay "Human" by Rag'n'Bone Man	27 May 2009; 18 May 2010; 10 April 2012; 15 September 2013; 8 April 2014; 10 January 2017
Young Guns	"The Writer" by Ellie Goulding	27 August 2010 (Reading Festival)
Yungblud	"Señorita/Back to Black/Goosebumps" by Shawn Mendes and Camila Cabello/Amy Winehouse/Travis Scott "Cardigan" by Taylor Swift "War Pigs/Power/Part of the Band" by Black Sabbath/Kanye West/The 1975 "Strangers" by Kenya Grace "Bitter Sweet Symphony" by the Verve	5 September 2019; 29 September 2020; 5 September 2022; 18 October 2023; 17 June 2025
Yungen	"1-800-273-8255" (with JP Cooper) by Logic (feat. Alessia Cara and Khalid)	5 October 2017

== Z ==
Artist/group	Song(s)	Date(s)
Zara Larsson	"Runnin' (Lose It All)" (with MNEK) by Naughty Boy (feat. Beyoncé and Arrow Benjamin) "Don't" by Bryson Tiller "Too Good" by Drake and Rihanna "All Night" by Beyoncé "Love Lies" by Khalid and Normani "People" by Libianca	16 December 2015; 7 March 2016; 21 September 2016; 16 March 2017; 12 November 2018; 13 June 2023
Zed Bias and Omar	"Everybody Loves The Sunshine" by Roy Ayers	29 June 2011
The Zutons	"Take Your Mama" by Scissor Sisters "Crazy" by Gnarls Barkley "Beautiful" by Christina Aguilera "Shut Up and Let Me Go" by Ting Tings "Back to Black" by Amy Winehouse	18 October 2004 23 May 2008 30 October 2024
