= List of UK Compilation Chart number ones of the 2010s =

This is the list of the number ones of the UK Compilation Chart during the 2010s.

== Number ones ==
Key
†	Best-selling compilation album of the year

Artist (Note: The artist, album, date of reaching number one and number of weeks at number one are those given by the Official Charts Company.)	Album	Record label	Reached number one (week ending)	Weeks at number one
2010
Various artists	Now That's What I Call Music! 74	EMI Virgin/UMTV	5 December 2009	6
Various artists	Anthems – Electronic 80s	Ministry of Sound	16 January 2010	1
Various artists	Running Trax	Ministry of Sound	23 January 2010	2
Various artists	Hope for Haiti Now	MTV Networks	6 February 2010	1
Various artists	R&B Love Songs 2010	UMTV	13 February 2010	2
Various artists	BRIT Awards 2010	Rhino	27 February 2010	2
Various artists	Mash Up Mix 90s	Ministry of Sound	13 March 2010	1
Various artists	Forever Friends – Mum in a Million	Sony	20 March 2010	1
Various artists	Massive R&B – Spring 2010	UMTV	27 March 2010	2
Various artists	Now That's What I Call Music! 75	EMI Virgin/UMTV	10 April 2010	7
Various artists	Chilled Acoustic	Ministry of Sound/EMI TV	29 May 2010	1
Various artists	R&B Clubland	AATW/UMTV/Sony CMG	5 June 2010	2
Original soundtrack	The Twilight Saga: Eclipse	Atlantic	19 June 2010	1
Various artists	American Anthems	Sony CMG/EMI TV	26 June 2010	2
Various artists	Clubland 17	AATW/UMTV	10 July 2010	2
Various artists	Anthems – R&B	Ministry of Sound/UMTV	24 July 2010	1
Various artists	Now That's What I Call Music! 76	EMI Virgin/UMTV	31 July 2010	11
Various artists	R&B in the Mix 2010	UMTV	16 October 2010	2
Various artists	The Very Best of Now Dance 2010	EMI Virgin/UMTV	30 October 2010	1
Various artists	Radio 1's Live Lounge – Volume 5	Sony/UMTV	6 November 2010	1
Various artists	Dreamboats and Petticoats Four	EMI TV/UMTV	13 November 2010	1
Various artists	Clubland 18	AATW/UMTV	20 November 2010	1
Various artists	Pop Party 8	UMTV	27 November 2010	1
Various artists	Now That's What I Call Music! 77 †	EMI Virgin/UMTV	4 December 2010	11
2011
Various artists	Love Songs – The Ultimate Collection	Sony CMG	19 February 2011	1
Various artists	BRIT Awards 2011	Rhino	26 February 2011	2
Various artists	Anthems Hip-Hop	Ministry of Sound	12 March 2011	2
Various artists	Massive R&B – Spring 2011	UMTV	26 March 2011	3
Various artists	Ultimate Floorfillers	AATW/EMI TV/UMTV	16 April 2011	1
Various artists	Now That's What I Call Music! 78	EMI Virgin/UMTV	23 April 2011	9
Various artists	The Old Grey Whistle Test: 40th Anniversary	EMI TV/Rhino/UMTV	25 June 2011	1
Various artists	Now That's What I Call Music! 78	EMI Virgin/UMTV	2 July 2011	1
Various artists	Clubland 19	AATW/UMTV	9 July 2011	4
Various artists	Now That's What I Call Music! 79	EMI Virgin/UMTV	6 August 2011	9
Various artists	Now That's What I Call R&B	EMI TV/Rhino/UMTV	8 October 2011	2
Various artists	Now That's What I Call Music! 79	EMI Virgin/UMTV	22 October 2011	2
Various artists	Pop Party 9	UMTV	5 November 2011	1
Various artists	Radio 1's Live Lounge – Volume 6	Rhino/Sony/UMTV	12 November 2011	1
Various artists	Clubland 20	AATW/UMTV	19 November 2011	1
Various artists	Pop Party 9	UMTV	26 November 2011	1
Various artists	Now That's What I Call Music! 80 †	EMI Virgin/UMTV	3 December 2011	9
2012
Various artists	Be My Baby	Sony	4 February 2012	4
Various artists	BRIT Awards 2012 with Mastercard	UMTV	3 March 2012	1
Various artists	Dreamboats & Petticoats Four – The Petticoat Collection	EMI TV/UMTV	10 March 2012	1
Various artists	Now That's What I Call Running	EMI TV/UMTV	17 March 2012	1
Various artists	Dreamboats & Petticoats Four – The Petticoat Collection	EMI TV/UMTV	24 March 2012	1
Various artists	Now That's What I Call Running	EMI TV/UMTV	31 March 2012	1
Various artists	Ultimate Clubland	AATW/UMTV	7 April 2012	1
Various artists	Now That's What I Call Music! 81	EMI TV/UMTV	14 April 2012	10
Various artists	Dreamboats and Petticoats Presents: 3 Steps to Heaven	EMI TV/UMTV	23 June 2012	1
Various artists	Now That's What I Call Music! 81	EMI TV/UMTV	30 June 2012	1
Various artists	Clubland 21	AATW/UMTV	7 July 2012	1
Various artists	Now That's What I Call Reggae	EMI TV/UMTV	14 July 2012	1
Various artists	Now That's What I Call a No.1	EMI TV/UMTV	21 July 2012	2
Various artists	Now That's What I Call Music! 82	EMI TV/UMTV	4 August 2012	13
Various artists	Until Now – Swedish House Mafia	Virgin	3 November 2012	1
Various artists	BBC Radio 1's Live Lounge 2012	Sony/UMTV/Rhino	10 November 2012	2
Various artists	Pop Party 10	Rhino/UMTV	24 November 2012	1
Various artists	Now That's What I Call Music! 83 †	EMI Virgin/UMTV	1 December 2012	9
2013
Various artists	The Trevor Nelson Collection	Sony	2 February 2013	4
Various artists	BRIT Awards 2013	UMTV	2 March 2013	2
Various artists	The Trevor Nelson Collection	Sony	16 March 2013	2
Various artists	Pop Party 11	Sony/UMTV	30 March 2013	1
Various artists	Now That's What I Call Music! 84	EMI Virgin/UMTV	6 April 2013	9
Various artists	Now That's What I Call 30 Years	Sony/EMI Virgin	8 June 2013	2
Various artists	Eddie Stobart Trucking Songs	Sony	22 June 2013	1
Various artists	Now That's What I Call 30 Years	Sony/EMI Virgin	29 June 2013	1
Various artists	Clubland 23	AATW/UMTV	6 July 2013	1
Various artists	Chilled R&B – The Platinum Edition	Sony	13 July 2013	1
Various artists	Holiday Anthems	Sony/UMTV	20 July 2013	2
Various artists	Now That's What I Call Music! 85	EMI Virgin/UMTV	3 August 2013	12
Various artists	Now That's What I Call 80s Dance	EMI Virgin/UMTV	26 October 2013	1
Various artists	Now That's What I Call Music! 85	Sony/EMI Virgin	2 November 2013	1
Various artists	BBC Radio 1's Live Lounge 2013	Sony/UMTV/Rhino	9 November 2013	2
Various artists	Pop Party 12	Rhino/UMTV	23 November 2013	1
Various artists	Now That's What I Call Music! 86 †	Sony/EMI Virgin	30 November 2013	8
2014
Various artists	The Trevor Nelson Collection 2	Sony	25 January 2014	3
Original soundtrack	Frozen	Walt Disney	15 February 2014	1
Various artists	I'm Every Woman	Rhino/Sony	22 February 2014	1
Various artists	BRIT Awards 2014	UMTV	1 March 2014	1
Various artists	Eat Sleep Rave Repeat	Ministry of Sound	8 March 2014	1
Original soundtrack	Frozen	Walt Disney	15 March 2014	1
Various artists	Now That's What I Call Running 2014	Sony/EMI Virgin	22 March 2014	1
Various artists	Now That's What I Call Feel Good	Sony/EMI Virgin	29 March 2014	1
Various artists	Your Songs 2014	EMI TV/UMTV	5 April 2014	1
Original soundtrack	Frozen	Walt Disney	12 April 2014	1
Various artists	Now That's What I Call Music! 87	Sony/EMI Virgin	19 April 2014	6
Original soundtrack	Frozen	Walt Disney	31 May 2014	3
Various artists	Eddie Stobart Trucking Songs – Trucking All Over The World	Sony	21 June 2014	1
Original soundtrack	Frozen	Walt Disney	28 June 2014	1
Various artists	Now That's What I Call Summer	Sony/EMI Virgin	5 July 2014	2
Various artists	The Nation's Favorite Motown Songs	UMC	19 July 2014	1
Original soundtrack	Frozen	Walt Disney	26 July 2014	1
Various artists	Now That's What I Call Music! 88	Sony/EMI Virgin	2 August 2014	8
Various artists	Keep Calm And Chill Out	Music Brokers	27 September 2014	6
Various artists	BBC Radio 1's Live Lounge 2014	Sony/UMTV/Rhino	8 November 2014	4
Various artists	Now That's What I Call Music! 89 †	Sony/EMI Virgin	6 December 2014	8
2015
Various artists	The Weekender	Ministry of Sound	31 January 2015	1
Various artists	Now That's What I Call Power Ballads	Sony/EMI Virgin	7 February 2015	2
Original Soundtrack	Fifty Shades of Grey	Republic Records	21 February 2015	6
Various artists	Move On Up: The Very Best of Northern Soul	UMTV	4 April 2015	1
Various artists	Now That's What I Call Music! 90	Sony/EMI Virgin	11 April 2015	9
Various artists	Now That's What I Call Classic Rock	Sony/EMI Virgin	13 June 2015	1
Various artists	T.F.I. Friday – The Album	UMTV	20 June 2015	1
Various artists	Now That's What I Call Classic Rock	Sony/EMI Virgin	27 June 2015	1
Various artists	Now That's What I Call a Summer Party	Sony/EMI Virgin	4 July 2015	5
Various artists	Now That's What I Call Music! 91	EMI/Universal	6 August 2015	10
Various artists	Keep Calm & Unwind	Music Brokers	15 October 2015	1
Various artists	Rappers Delight	Ministry of Sound	22 October 2015	2
Various artists	Now That's What I Call A Singer	EMI/Universal	5 November 2015	1
Various artists	BBC Radio 1's Live Lounge 2015	Sony/UMTV/Rhino	12 November 2015	1
Various artists	The Annual 2016	Ministry of Sound	19 November 2015	2
Various artists	Now That's What I Call Music! 92 †	EMI/Universal	3 December 2015	7
2016
Various artists	Go Hard or Go Home	Ministry of Sound	21 January 2016	1
Various artists	Acoustic Café	Sony Music TV	28 January 2016	2
Various artists	Throwback Slowjams	Ministry of Sound	5 February 2016	3
Various artists	Brit Awards 2016	UMTV	26 February 2016	1
Various artists	Sing Your Heart Out 2016	UMTV	4 March 2016	3
Various artists	Now That's What I Call Music! 93	EMI/Universal	25 March 2016	7
Various artists	100% Clubland	UMTV	19 May 2016	1
Various artists	Now That's What I Call Music! 93	EMI/Universal	26 May 2016	1
Various artists	100% Clubland	UMTV	3 June 2016	1
Various artists	Now That's What I Call Music! 93	EMI/Universal	10 June 2016	1
Various artists	100% Clubland	UMTV	17 June 2016	1
Various artists	Throwback Summer Jamz	Ministry of Sound	24 June 2016	3
Various artists	Now That What I Call Summer Hits	EMI/Universal	15 July 2016	3
Various artists	Now That's What I Call Music! 94	EMI/Universal	5 August 2016	13
Various artists	Now That's What I Call 20th Century	EMI/Universal	3 November 2016	1
Various artists	Funk the Disco	Ministry of Sound	10 November 2016	1
Various artists	The Annual 2017	Ministry of Sound	17 November 2016	1
Various artists	Dreamcoats & Petticoats 10th Anniversary Collection	UMOD	24 November 2016	1
Various artists	Now That's What I Call Music! 95 †	EMI/Universal	1 December 2016	10
2017
Various artists	R&B Mixtape	Ministry of Sound	9 February 2017	1
Various artists	I Love Trance	Ministry of Sound	16 February 2017	2
Various artists	Brit Awards 2017	UMTV	2 March 2017	2
Various artists	Power House	AATW/UMOD	16 March 2017	1
Various artists	Sleepin Is Cheatin	Ministry of Sound	23 March 2017	1
Various artists	Now That's What I Call Mum	EMI/Universal	30 March 2017	1
Various artists	Sing Your Heart Out 2017	UMTV	6 April 2017	2
Various artists	Now That's What I Call Music! 96	EMI/Universal	20 April 2017	9
Various artists	I Love Reggae	Ministry of Sound	22 June 2017	2
Various artists	Now That's What I Call A Summer Party 2017	EMI/Universal	6 July 2017	1
Various artists	I Love Reggae	Ministry of Sound	13 July 2017	2
Various artists	Now That's What I Call A Summer Party 2017	EMI/Universal	27 July 2017	1
Various artists	Now That's What I Call Music! 97	EMI/Universal	3 August 2017	11
Various artists	Old Skool Ravers	Ministry of Sound	19 October 2017	1
Various artists	Now That's What I Call Music! 97	EMI/Universal	26 October 2017	3
Various artists	Dreamboats & Petticoats – The Diamond Collection	UMOD	16 November 2017	2
Various artists	Now That's What I Call Music! 98	EMI/Universal	30 November 2017	9
2018
Various artists	MTV Rocks	UMOD	1 February 2018	5
Various artists	Magic 80's	UMOD	8 March 2018	1
Various artists	Now That's What I Call Mum	EMI/Universal	15 March 2018	2
Various artists	Andrew Lloyd Webber – Unmasked	Polydor/UMC	29 March 2018	1
Various artists	Now That's What I Call Music! 99	EMI/Universal	5 April 2018	6
Various artists	80s Soul Jams	Ministry of Sound	17 May 2018	2
Various artists	Now That's What I Call Music! 99	EMI/Universal	31 May 2018	2
Various artists	Throwback Reggae Dancehall	Ministry of Sound	7 June 2018	2
Various artists	I Love Ibiza	Ministry of Sound	21 June 2018	1
Various artists	Now That's What I Call Summer Party 2018	EMI/Universal	5 July 2018	2
Various artists	Love Island – The Pool Party	Ministry of Sound	19 July 2018	2
Various artists	Now That's What I Call Music! 100 †	EMI/Universal	2 August 2018	6
Various artists	I Love 80s	Ministry of Sound	13 September 2018	1
Various artists	Now That's What I Call Music! 100 †	EMI/Universal	20 September 2018	6
Various artists	Sing Your Heart Out Disney	Walt Disney	1 November 2018	1
Various artists	Soul Legends	UMOD	8 November 2018	1
Various artists	Dreamboats and Petticoats - Golden Years	UMOD	15 November 2018	2
Various artists	The Greatest Showman: Reimagined	Atlantic	29 November 2018	1
Various artists	Now That's What I Call Music! 101	EMI/Universal	6 December 2018	10
2019
Various artists	80s Soul Jams Vol. 2	Ministry of Sound	14 February 2019	1
Various artists	Now That's What I Call Music! 101	EMI/Universal	21 February 2019	2
Various artists	Now That's What I Call Music! 100 Hits 80's	EMI/Universal	7 March 2019	1
Various artists	MTV Rocks - Indie Revolution	UMOD	14 March 2019	1
Various artists	Now That's What I Call Music! 101	EMI/Universal	21 March 2019	1
Various artists	Sing Your Heart Out 2019	UMOD/Sony Music CG	28 March 2019	1
Various artists	Country Forever	UMOD	4 April 2019	1
Various artists	Now 100 Hits - Power Ballads	EMI/Sony Music CG	11 April 2019	2
Various artists	Now That's What I Call Music! 102	EMI/Universal	25 April 2019	7
Various artists	Now 100 Hits - Forgotten 80's	EMI/Universal	7 June 2019	3
Various artists	Now That's What I Call Music! 102	EMI/Universal	28 June 2019	1
Various artists	Now That's What I Call A Summer Party 2019	EMI/Universal	11 July 2019	2
Various artists	Reggae Summer Soundsystem	Ministry of Sound	25 July 2019	1
Various artists	Now That's What I Call Music! 103	EMI/Universal	1 August 2019	15
Various artists	BBC Children In Need - Got It Covered	Silva Screen	14 November 2019	1
Various artists	Now That's What I Call Music! 104	EMI/Universal	21 November 2019	8
