= Live Lounge =

BBC Radio segment

The Live Lounge is a segment on the British radio stations BBC Radio 1 and BBC Radio 1Xtra. It was originally named and created by then Radio 1's Head of Music Jeff Smith, hosted by Simon Mayo, and later by Jo Whiley on her weekday mid-morning, and later weekend lunchtime radio shows, then by Fearne Cotton from 2009 until 2015, and then by Clara Amfo from May 2015 to August 2021. Since September 2026 the segment is now hosted by Jeremiah Asiamah and Charlie Hedges.

It exhibits well-known artists usually performing one song of their own and one by another artist, in an acoustic format. The Live Lounge itself is also a physical room in the Radio 1 studios, from where some of the performances are broadcast; however, due to its size, many are done from the BBC Maida Vale Studios. From 2009, Trevor Nelson began hosting Live Lounges on his BBC Radio 1Xtra show, and was replaced in that slot by DJ Ace in 2017.

The songs chosen as cover versions are often a completely different genre to that which the artist usually performs, and offer a new perspective on the original. Jamie Cullum's cover of Pharrell Williams's "Frontin'" led to Cullum being signed to Pharrell's label Star Trak when played to him at a later visit to The Jo Whiley Show, and was added to his 2003 album Twentysomething.

== Performances and albums ==
Title	Album details	Peak chart positions	
Title	Album details	UK	IRE
Volume 1	Released: 16 October 2006; Label: Sony Music Entertainment; Formats: CD, download	1	—
Volume 2	Released: 22 October 2007; Label: Sony Music Entertainment; Formats: CD, download	1	—
Volume 3	Released: 20 October 2008; Label: Sony Music Entertainment; Formats: CD, download	2	—
Volume 4	Released: 26 October 2009; Label: Sony Music Entertainment; Formats: CD, download	1	—
Volume 5	Released: 25 October 2010; Label: Sony Music Entertainment, Universal Music Group; Formats: CD, download	1	—
The Best Of	Released: 6 June 2011; Label: Sony CMG; Formats: CD, download	2	—
Volume 6	Released: 31 October 2011; Label: Sony CMG; Formats: CD, download	1	—
BBC Radio 1's Live Lounge 2012	Released: 29 October 2012; Label: Sony CMG; Formats: CD, download	1	—
BBC Radio 1's Live Lounge 2013	Released: 28 October 2013; Label: Sony CMG; Formats: CD, download	1	—
BBC Radio 1's Live Lounge 2014	Released: 27 October 2014; Label: Sony CMG; Formats: CD, download	1	2
BBC Radio 1's Live Lounge 2015	Released: 30 October 2015; Label: Sony CMG; Formats: CD, download	1	2
BBC Radio 1's Live Lounge 2016	Released: 11 November 2016; Label: Sony CMG; Formats: CD, download	2	8
BBC Radio 1's Live Lounge 2017	Released: 17 November 2017; Label: Sony CMG; Formats: CD, download	2	7
BBC Radio 1's Live Lounge 2018	Released: 23 November 2018; Label: Ministry of Sound; Formats: CD, download	6	18
BBC Radio 1's Live Lounge: The Collection	Released 8 November 2019; Label: Ministry of Sound; Formats: CD, download	6	
"—" denotes album that did not chart or was not released

== Live Lounge Features ==
Over the years of Live Lounge, various Radio 1 features have involved this segment, these include:

- Live Lounge Tour
- Ultimate Live Lounge
- Live Lounge of 2010
- A-Z of the Live Lounge
- List of Live Lounge cover versions

== Live Lounge Special ==
On 27 January 2011 BBC Radio 1 launched a new extended version of the popular Live Lounge dubbed 'Live Lounge Special with...' or sometimes referred to as 'Live Lounge XL'. The extended live lounge performance differs from the normal performance with an interview at the very beginning of the set rather than at the beginning of each track. Then the artist performs 5 or 6 tracks uninterrupted, which can include a cover.

=== 2011 ===
Broadcast Date	Artist	Set List
27 January 2011	Adele	"Rolling in the Deep
27 January 2011	Adele	"Don't You Remember"
27 January 2011	Adele	"Promise This" (Cheryl Cole)
27 January 2011	Adele	"Hometown Glory"
27 January 2011	Adele	"Chasing Pavements"
27 January 2011	Adele	"Someone Like You"
30 September 2011	Cee Lo Green	"Bright Lights Bigger City"
30 September 2011	Cee Lo Green	"It's OK"
30 September 2011	Cee Lo Green	"Inhaler" (Miles Kane)
30 September 2011	Cee Lo Green	"I Want You"
30 September 2011	Cee Lo Green	"Cry Baby"
30 September 2011	Cee Lo Green	"Forget You"
30 September 2011	Cee Lo Green	"Crazy" (Gnarls Barkley)/"Natural Blues" (Moby)
25 November 2011	Florence and the Machine	"Shake It Out"
25 November 2011	Florence and the Machine	"What the Water Gave Me"
25 November 2011	Florence and the Machine	"Take Care" (Drake)
25 November 2011	Florence and the Machine	"Rabbit Heart (Raise It Up)"
25 November 2011	Florence and the Machine	"Dog Days Are Over"
25 November 2011	Florence and the Machine	"No Light, No Light"

=== 2012 ===
Broadcast Date	Artist	Set List
19 March 2012	Katy Perry	"Part of Me"
19 March 2012	Katy Perry	"The One That Got Away"
19 March 2012	Katy Perry	"Firework"
19 March 2012	Katy Perry	"Thinking of You"
19 March 2012	Katy Perry	"Paris" (Jay-Z & Kanye West)
13 June 2012	Usher	"Scream"
13 June 2012	Usher	"U Remind Me"
13 June 2012	Usher	"Yeah!"
13 June 2012	Usher	"OMG"
13 June 2012	Usher	"Pumped Up Kicks" (Foster the People)
13 June 2012	Usher	"Climax"
25 September 2012	Mumford & Sons	"Roll Away Your Stone"
25 September 2012	Mumford & Sons	"Below My Feet"
25 September 2012	Mumford & Sons	"The Cave"
25 September 2012	Mumford & Sons	"Tessellate"(Alt-J (∆))
25 September 2012	Mumford & Sons	"Ghosts That We Knew"
25 September 2012	Mumford & Sons	"I Will Wait"
28 September 2012	Muse	"Madness"
28 September 2012	Muse	"Uprising"
28 September 2012	Muse	"Follow Me"
28 September 2012	Muse	"Panic Station"
28 September 2012	Muse	"Sign o' the Times"(Prince)
28 September 2012	Muse	"Starlight"
12 December 2012	Ben Howard	"Esmerelda"
12 December 2012	Ben Howard	"Only Love"
12 December 2012	Ben Howard	"Keep Your Head Up"
12 December 2012	Ben Howard	"Oats In The Water"
12 December 2012	Ben Howard	"Figure 8"(Ellie Goulding)
