= BBC Radio 1's Live Lounge 2016 =

Compilation album by Various artists
- Released: 11 November 2016
- Genre: Various
- Label: Sony
- Producer: Various

Live Lounge chronology
BBC Radio 1's Live Lounge 2015 (2015)	BBC Radio 1's Live Lounge 2016 (2016)	BBC Radio 1's Live Lounge 2017 (2017)

BBC Radio 1's Live Lounge 2016 is a compilation album consisting of live tracks played on Clara Amfo's BBC Radio 1 show, both cover versions and original songs. The album was released on 11 November 2016, and is the twelfth in the series of Live Lounge albums. It debuted on the iTunes UK chart at #6 and reached #2. One reviewer said "As always with every Live Lounge collection, the best you can hope for is a mixed bag."

== Track listing ==
Disc one
No.	Title	Artist	Length
1.	"Love Yourself" (originally by Justin Bieber)	Craig David	3:08
2.	"7 Years"	Lukas Graham	3:50
3.	"Can't Stop the Feeling/Rock Your Body" (originally by Justin Timberlake)	Olly Murs	4:16
4.	"Adventure of a Lifetime"	Coldplay	3:31
5.	"Lush Life" (originally by Zara Larsson)	Nick Jonas	3:35
6.	"Ex's & Oh's" (originally by Elle King)	Fifth Harmony	2:53
7.	"Crash"	Usher	3:35
8.	"One Dance" (originally by Drake)	Gorgon City	3:17
9.	"In Ibiza"	Mike Posner	3:59
10.	"Stitches"	Shawn Mendes	3:20
11.	"Hymn for the Weekend" (originally by Coldplay)	James Bay	3:47
12.	"Sorry" (originally by Justin Bieber)	The 1975	3:37
13.	"Fast Car" (originally by Tracy Chapman)	Birdy	3:03
14.	"How Will I Know/Perfect Strangers" (originally by Whitney Houston/Jonas Blue)	MØ	2:49
15.	"This Is What You Came For" (originally by Calvin Harris)	Chvrches	4:30
16.	"7 Days/Final Song" (originally by Craig David/MØ)	Bastille	4:23
17.	"Tilted" (originally by Christine and the Queens)	Biffy Clyro	2:38
18.	"We Don't Talk Anymore"	Charlie Puth	3:57
19.	"Work from Home" (originally by Fifth Harmony)	Clean Bandit feat. Louisa Johnson	2:42

Disc two
No.	Title	Artist	Length
1.	"Hello" (originally by Adele)	The Maccabees	2:46
2.	"Can't Feel My Face"	The Weeknd	3:29
3.	"Work/Pillowtalk/Children" (originally by Rihanna/Zayn/Robert Miles)	Blonde	3:07
4.	"FourFiveSeconds" (originally by Rihanna, Kanye West & Paul McCartney)	One Direction	2:52
5.	"Hotter than Hell" (originally by Dua Lipa)	Jonas Blue & JP Cooper	3:29
6.	"Worry"	Jack Garratt	4:25
7.	"On My Mind" (originally by Ellie Goulding)	Lower Than Atlantis	3:27
8.	"You Don't Own Me" (originally by Lesley Gore)	Grace	2:14
9.	"The Hills" (originally by The Weeknd)	Dua Lipa	3:43
10.	"Hands to Myself" (originally by Selena Gomez)	DNCE	3:12
11.	"Pillowtalk" (originally by Zayn)	Karen Harding	3:27
12.	"The Sound" (originally by The 1975)	Tom Odell	4:01
13.	"Hotline Bling" (originally by Drake)	Alessia Cara	4:16
14.	"Wasn't Expecting That"	Jamie Lawson	3:17
15.	"Wildest Dreams" (originally by Taylor Swift)	Kygo feat. Ella Henderson	3:34
16.	"Sax"	Fleur East	3:46
17.	"In2" (originally by WSTRN)	Blossoms	3:17
18.	"White Tiger"	Izzy Bizu	3:54
19.	"New Person, Same Old Mistakes" (originally by Tame Impala)	Laura Mvula	3:52
