= BBC Radio 1's Live Lounge 2018 =

Compilation album by Various artists
- Released: 23 November 2018
- Genre: Various
- Label: Sony
- Producer: Various

Live Lounge chronology
| BBC Radio 1's Live Lounge 2017 (2017) | BBC Radio 1's Live Lounge 2018 (2018) | BBC Radio 1's Live Lounge: The Collection (2019) |

BBC Radio 1's Live Lounge 2018 is a compilation album consisting of live tracks played on Clara Amfo's BBC Radio 1 show, both cover versions and original songs. The album was released on 23 November 2018, and is the fourteenth in the series of Live Lounge albums. It debuted on the iTunes UK chart at #8.

== Track listing ==
Disc one
| No. | Title | Artist | Length |
|---|---|---|---|
| 1. | "Paradise" | George Ezra | 3:51 |
| 2. | "God Is a Woman" | Ariana Grande | 3:21 |
| 3. | "New Rules" | Dua Lipa | 3:31 |
| 4. | "I Miss You" | Clean Bandit feat. Julia Michaels | 3:34 |
| 5. | "If You're Over Me" | Years & Years | 3:09 |
| 6. | "These Days" | Rudimental feat. Jess Glynne, Macklemore & Dan Caplen | 2:56 |
| 7. | "Skin" | Rag'n'Bone Man | 4:38 |
| 8. | "Too Good At Goodbyes" | Sam Smith | 4:59 |
| 9. | "Youngblood" | 5 Seconds of Summer | 3:39 |
| 10. | "In My Blood" | Shawn Mendes | 3:35 |
| 11. | "Anywhere" | Rita Ora | 3:28 |
| 12. | "Rise" | Jonas Blue feat. Jack & Jack | 3:51 |
| 13. | "I Know You" | Craig David feat. Bastille | 3:15 |
| 14. | "Naked" | James Arthur | 3:42 |
| 15. | "How Long" | Charlie Puth | 3:20 |
| 16. | "Girlfriend" | Christine and the Queens | 3:21 |
| 17. | "Beautifully Unconventional" | Wolf Alice | 2:18 |

Disc two
| No. | Title | Artist | Length |
|---|---|---|---|
| 1. | "No Tears Left To Cry" (originally by Ariana Grande) | Years & Years | 3:44 |
| 2. | "Psycho" (originally by Post Malone feat. Ty Dolla Sign) | Shawn Mendes | 2:45 |
| 3. | "Do I Wanna Know?" (originally by Arctic Monkeys) | Dua Lipa | 3:26 |
| 4. | "Heavy" | Anne-Marie | 3:04 |
| 5. | "Young, Dumb & Broke" (originally by Khalid) | Jessie Ware | 3:12 |
| 6. | "IDGAF" (originally by Dua Lipa) | Panic! at the Disco | 3:35 |
| 7. | "Shotgun" (originally by George Ezra) | The Vamps | 3:30 |
| 8. | "Good Riddance (Time Of Your Life)" (originally by Green Day) | Wolf Alice | 2:46 |
| 9. | "What Lovers Do" (originally by Maroon 5 feat. SZA) | Christine and the Queens | 3:45 |
| 10. | "Feel It Still" (originally by Portugal. The Man) | Plan B | 2:55 |
| 11. | "No Roots" (originally by Alice Merton) | 5 Seconds of Summer | 2:33 |
| 12. | "Strangers" | Sigrid | 4:08 |
| 13. | "Grace (We All Try)" | Rag'n'Bone Man | 3:43 |
| 14. | "Blue Lights" | Jorja Smith | 4:14 |
| 15. | "Fix You" (originally by Coldplay) | Mabel | 4:05 |
| 16. | "Hell To The Liars" | London Grammar | 3:40 |
