= BBC Radio 1's Live Lounge: The Collection =

Compilation album by Various artists
- Released: 8 November 2019
- Genre: Various
- Label: Sony
- Producer: Various

Live Lounge chronology
BBC Radio 1's Live Lounge 2018 (2018)	BBC Radio 1's Live Lounge: The Collection (2019)

BBC Radio 1's Live Lounge: The Collection is a compilation album consisting of live tracks played on Clara Amfo's BBC Radio 1 show, both cover versions and original songs. The album was released on 8 November 2019, and is the fifteenth in the series of Live Lounge albums. It debuted on the iTunes UK chart at #8 and hit #4.

== Track listing ==
Disc one
No.	Title	Artist	Length
1.	"Fast Car" (originally by Tracy Chapman)	Khalid	4:11
2.	"Wish You Well"	Sigala & Becky Hill	3:25
3.	"Shallow" (originally by Lady Gaga and Bradley Cooper)	Lewis Capaldi	3:46
4.	"Summertime Sadness" (originally by Lana Del Rey)	Miley Cyrus	3:58
5.	"It's Not Living (If It's Not with You)"	The 1975	3:59
6.	"One Kiss" (originally by Calvin Harris and Dua Lipa)	Sigrid	3:23
7.	"All Night" (originally by Beyoncé)	London Grammar	4:31
8.	"I'm Not the Only One"	Sam Smith	4:11
9.	"Cry Me a River" (originally by Justin Timberlake)	Jorja Smith	3:19
10.	"Hometown Glory" (originally by Adele)	Tom Walker	4:01
11.	"Don't Call Me Up"	Mabel	2:56
12.	"Flowers" (originally by Sweet Female Attitude)	AJ Tracey & Jorja Smith	3:36
13.	"Stay With Me" (originally by Sam Smith)	FKA Twigs	3:16
14.	"(No One Knows Me) Like The Piano"	Sampha	3:37
15.	"Break Up with Your Girlfriend, I'm Bored" (originally by Ariana Grande)	Sam Fender	3:20

Disc two
No.	Title	Artist	Length
1.	"Wonderwall"	Oasis	4:54
2.	"No Surprises"	Radiohead	3:50
3.	"Wrecking Ball"	Miley Cyrus	3:52
4.	"Rebellion (Lies)"	Arcade Fire	4:42
5.	"Somebody Told Me"	The Killers	3:30
6.	"Red Morning Light"	Kings of Leon	3:06
7.	"Slide Away" (originally by Oasis)	Jake Bugg	2:56
8.	"Canned Heat"	Jamiroquai	6:39
9.	"Fill Me In"	Craig David	3:24
10.	"Video Games" (originally by Lana Del Rey)	Tom Odell	4:37
11.	"Here With Me"	Dido	3:34
12.	"Patience"	Take That	3:25
13.	"Take Me Out"	Franz Ferdinand	3:29
14.	"The Importance Of Being Idle"	Oasis	3:48
15.	"Smile Like You Mean It"	The Killers	3:59
