= BBC Radio 1's Live Lounge 2017 =

Compilation album by Various artists
- Released: 17 November 2017
- Genre: Various
- Label: Sony
- Producer: Various

Live Lounge chronology
BBC Radio 1's Live Lounge 2016 (2016)	BBC Radio 1's Live Lounge 2017 (2017)	BBC Radio 1's Live Lounge 2018 (2018)

BBC Radio 1's Live Lounge 2017 is a compilation album consisting of live tracks played on Clara Amfo's BBC Radio 1 show, both cover versions and original songs. The album was released on 17 November 2017, and is the thirteenth in the series of Live Lounge albums. It debuted on the iTunes UK chart at #6 and reached #3.

== Track listing ==
Disc one
No.	Title	Artist	Length
1.	"Castle on the Hill"	Ed Sheeran	3:45
2.	"What About Us"	P!nk	4:29
3.	"Graceland" (originally by Paul Simon)	Chris Martin	4:06
4.	"Wild Thoughts" (originally by DJ Khaled feat. Rihanna & Bryson Tiller)	Harry Styles	2:25
5.	"Human"	Rag'n'Bone Man	3:30
6.	"7 Days"	Craig David	4:35
7.	"Changes" (originally by 2Pac)	The Script	3:46
8.	"Your Song"	Rita Ora	3:11
9.	"Ciao Adios"	Anne-Marie	3:22
10.	"Rollin/Did You See" (originally by Calvin Harris feat. Future & Khalid/J Hus)	Dua Lipa feat. Miguel	2:57
11.	"Oh Woman Oh Man"	London Grammar	4:39
12.	"Don't Worry, Be Happy" (originally by Bobby McFerrin)	George Ezra	5:12
13.	"Malibu"	Miley Cyrus	4:22
14.	"My Love" (originally by Justin Timberlake)	The xx	3:42
15.	"Slide" (originally by Calvin Harris feat. Frank Ocean & Migos)	Disciples	3:42
16.	"Passionfruit" (originally by Drake)	Paramore	3:37

Disc two
No.	Title	Artist	Length
1.	"Let There Be Rock" (originally by AC/DC)	Foo Fighters	5:32
2.	"Hands to Myself" (originally by Selena Gomez)	Kings of Leon	4:11
3.	"Everything Now"	Arcade Fire	5:16
4.	"Purple Rain" (originally by Prince)	London Grammar	3:31
5.	"My Sharona" (originally by The Knack)	Royal Blood	2:38
6.	"The Chain" (originally by Fleetwood Mac)	Harry Styles	4:11
7.	"Say You Won't Let Go"	James Arthur	4:13
8.	"Teardrops/Move On Up" (originally by Womack & Womack/Marvin Gaye)	Rudimental feat. Bridgette Amofah	3:40
9.	"Freedom" (originally by Beyoncé)	Rag'n'Bone Man	3:44
10.	"Sign Of The Times" (originally by Harry Styles)	Ellie Goulding & Kygo	3:51
11.	"Don't Matter Now"	George Ezra	3:01
12.	"Rockabye" (originally by Clean Bandit feat. Anne-Marie & Sean Paul)	Louisa Johnson	3:17
13.	"Years & Years"	Olly Murs	4:21
14.	"Too Good" (originally by Drake feat. Rihanna)	Zara Larsson	3:55
15.	"Starboy" (originally by The Weeknd)	Panic! at the Disco	3:45
16.	"Big for Your Boots"	Stormzy	3:44
