= BBC Radio 1's Live Lounge 2014 =

Compilation album by Various artists
- Released: 27 October 2014
- Genre: Various
- Label: Sony
- Producer: Various

Live Lounge chronology
BBC Radio 1's Live Lounge 2013 (2013)	BBC Radio 1's Live Lounge 2014 (2014)	BBC Radio 1's Live Lounge 2015 (2015)

BBC Radio 1's Live Lounge 2014 is a compilation album consisting of live tracks played on Fearne Cotton's BBC Radio 1 show, both cover versions and original songs. The album was released on 27 October 2014, and is the tenth in the series of Live Lounge albums.

== Track listing ==
Disc 1
No.	Title	Artist	Length
1.	"Stay With Me" (originally by Sam Smith)	Ed Sheeran	2:48
2.	"Hideaway" (originally by Kiesza)	Ben Howard	3:16
3.	"Say Something" (originally by A Great Big World)	Ella Henderson	3:18
4.	"Happy" (originally by Pharrell Williams)	Maroon 5	3:16
5.	"Berlin" (originally by RY X)	Sam Smith	3:34
6.	"Budapest"	George Ezra	3:08
7.	"How Long Will I Love You" (originally by The Waterboys)	Ellie Goulding	2:28
8.	"Holy Grail / Counting Stars / Smells Like Teen Spirit" (originally by Jay Z / OneRepublic / Nirvana)	Little Mix	3:43
9.	"Superheroes"	The Script	3:40
10.	"The Man"	Aloe Blacc	3:47
11.	"Fancy" (originally by Iggy Azalea featuring Charli XCX)	Kasabian	3:44
12.	"Scream (Funk My Life Up)"	Paolo Nutini	3:09
13.	"We Can't Stop" (originally by Miley Cyrus)	Bastille	3:38
14.	"Shake It Off" (originally by Taylor Swift)	Labrinth	4:12
15.	"Roar" (originally by Katy Perry)	Tom Odell	3:58
16.	"Nobody to Love / Doo Wop (That Thing)" (originally by Sigma / Lauryn Hill)	Kiesza	3:35
17.	"Crying for No Reason"	Katy B	4:01
18.	"I Got U"	Duke Dumont featuring Jax Jones	4:16
19.	"Rather Be"	Clean Bandit featuring Jess Glynne	3:48

Disc 2
No.	Title	Artist	Length
1.	"Oceans"	Coldplay	3:43
2.	"Wrecking Ball" (originally by Miley Cyrus)	London Grammar	3:42
3.	"Amnesia"	5 Seconds of Summer	3:44
4.	"Sex"	The 1975	3:46
5.	"Waves" (originally by Mr Probz)	Indiana featuring RHODES	3:08
6.	"XO" (originally by Beyoncé)	Haim	4:32
7.	"Magic" (originally by Coldplay)	Jacob Banks	4:08
8.	"Do I Wanna Know?" (originally by Arctic Monkeys)	Hozier	4:19
9.	"Hold On, We're Going Home" (originally by Drake featuring Majid Jordan)	Nick Mulvey	3:16
10.	"F for You" (originally by Disclosure featuring Mary J Blige)	Bombay Bicycle Club	2:45
11.	"Lovers on the Sun" (originally by David Guetta featuring Sam Martin)	Mallory Knox	2:57
12.	"Am I Wrong" (originally by Nico & Vinz)	Lower Than Atlantis	4:11
13.	"Forever" (originally by Haim)	James Bay	4:03
14.	"Dark Horse" (originally by Katy Perry)	Example	2:59
15.	"Comeback"	Ella Eyre	3:19
16.	"Drunk In Love" (originally by Beyoncé)	Angel Haze	4:37
17.	"Counting Stars" (originally by OneRepublic)	Wilkinson featuring Becky Hill	4:13
18.	"Strong" (originally by London Grammar)	Chase & Status	3:54
19.	"The Monster / Story of My Life" (originally by Eminem featuring Rihanna / One Direction)	Rudimental	3:14
20.	"Ready for Your Love"	Gorgon City featuring MNEK	3:23
