= BBC Radio 1's Live Lounge 2015 =

Compilation album by Various artists
- Released: 30 October 2015
- Genre: Various
- Label: Sony
- Producer: Various

Live Lounge chronology
BBC Radio 1's Live Lounge 2014 (2014)	BBC Radio 1's Live Lounge 2015 (2015)	BBC Radio 1's Live Lounge 2016 (2016)

BBC Radio 1's Live Lounge 2015 is a compilation album consisting of live tracks played on Clara Amfo's BBC Radio 1 show, both cover versions and original songs. The album was released on 30 October 2015, and is the eleventh in the series of Live Lounge albums.

== Track listing ==
Disc one
No.	Title	Artist	Length
1.	"Take Me to Church" (originally by Hozier)	Ed Sheeran	3:11
2.	"Black Magic"	Little Mix	3:34
3.	"FourFiveSeconds" (originally by Rihanna, Kanye West and Paul McCartney)	James Bay	3:08
4.	"Hotline Bling" (originally by Drake)	Disclosure featuring Sam Smith	3:44
5.	"On My Mind"	Ellie Goulding	3:28
6.	"Hold Back the River" (originally by James Bay)	Ella Henderson	3:47
7.	"Ship to Wreck"	Florence + the Machine	3:57
8.	"Let It Go / Umbrella" (originally by James Bay / Rihanna)	Jess Glynne	3:27
9.	"Earned It" (originally by The Weeknd)	Years & Years	3:11
10.	"Up"	Olly Murs featuring Ella Eyre	3:42
11.	"Heartbeat Song"	Kelly Clarkson	3:07
12.	"Lips Are Movin"	Meghan Trainor	2:59
13.	"Firestone" (originally by Kygo)	Birdy	2:13
14.	"King" (originally by Years & Years)	Nick Jonas	3:02
15.	"How Deep Is Your Love" (originally by Calvin Harris and Disciples)	Charlie Puth	3:13
16.	"What Do You Mean?" (originally by Justin Bieber)	Chvrches	3:39
17.	"Run Away with Me" (originally by Carly Rae Jepsen)	John Newman	4:19
18.	"Body on Me" (originally by Rita Ora)	Rudimental	3:16
19.	"Uptown Funk" (originally by Mark Ronson)	Jungle	4:27

Disc two
No.	Title	Artist	Length
1.	"Lay Me Down" (originally by Sam Smith)	Hozier	3:33
2.	"Blank Space / Stand By Me" (originally by Taylor Swift / Ben E. King)	Imagine Dragons	4:32
3.	"2Shy" (originally by Shura)	Mumford & Sons	4:14
4.	"Barcelona"	George Ezra	4:06
5.	"Black Skinhead" (originally by Kanye West)	Catfish and the Bottlemen	2:39
6.	"Love Me Like You Do" (originally by Ellie Goulding)	Circa Waves	3:06
7.	"Cheerleader" (originally by Omi)	The Vaccines	3:08
8.	"Sing / Shake It Off / Uptown Funk" (originally by Ed Sheeran / Taylor Swift / Mark Ronson)	Kodaline	3:14
9.	"Where Are U Now" (originally by Jack Ü)	Rixton	3:25
10.	"Lean On" (originally by Major Lazer)	The Maccabees	2:35
11.	"The Giver (Reprise)" (originally by Duke Dumont)	Mark Ronson featuring Keyone Starr	4:07
12.	"Bad Blood" (originally by Taylor Swift)	Lucy Rose	3:05
13.	"Photograph" (originally by Ed Sheeran)	Foxes	3:58
14.	"Jealous" (originally by Labrinth)	Jessie Ware	3:35
15.	"Habits (Stay High)" (originally by Tove Lo)	Kygo featuring Parson James	4:12
16.	"Heroes (We Could Be)" (originally by Alesso)	Mallory Knox	3:22
17.	"Bloodstream" (originally by Ed Sheeran)	Kwabs featuring Stormzy	4:35
18.	"Thinking Out Loud" (originally by Ed Sheeran)	Wretch 32	4:23
19.	"Shutdown" (originally by Skepta)	Slaves	3:01
20.	"Lies" (originally by Chvrches)	Muse	3:48
