= BBC Radio 1's Live Lounge 2013 =

Compilation album by Various artists
- Released: 28 October 2013
- Genre: Various
- Label: Sony
- Producer: Various

Live Lounge chronology
BBC Radio 1's Live Lounge 2012 (2012)	BBC Radio 1's Live Lounge 2013 (2013)	BBC Radio 1's Live Lounge 2014 (2014)

BBC Radio 1's Live Lounge 2013 is a compilation album consisting of live tracks played on Fearne Cotton's BBC Radio 1 show, both cover versions and original songs. The album was released on 28 October 2013, and is the ninth in the series of Live Lounge albums.

== Track listing ==
Disc one
No.	Title	Artist	Length
1.	"Waiting All Night"	Rudimental featuring Ella Eyre	4:22
2.	"Hold On, We're Going Home" (originally by Drake featuring Majid Jordan)	Arctic Monkeys	3:19
3.	"Pompeii"	Bastille	3:26
4.	"La La La"	Naughty Boy featuring Sam Smith	3:38
5.	"Mirrors" (originally by Justin Timberlake)	Ellie Goulding	4:39
6.	"Get Lucky" (originally by Daft Punk)	Daughter	4:52
7.	"I Love It" (originally by Icona Pop featuring Charli XCX)	Robin Thicke	2:42
8.	"I Will Wait" (originally by Mumford & Sons)	Little Mix	3:35
9.	"Let Her Go" (originally by Passenger)	Birdy	3:27
10.	"Lightning Bolt"	Jake Bugg	2:16
11.	"I Knew You Were Trouble" (originally by Taylor Swift)	Tom Odell	4:44
12.	"Stay" (originally by Rihanna)	Thirty Seconds to Mars	4:07
13.	"Don't You Worry Child" (originally by Swedish House Mafia featuring John Martin)	Olly Murs	3:38
14.	"Talk Dirty"	Jason Derulo	2:50
15.	"It's My Party"	Jessie J	3:35
16.	"Summertime Sadness" (originally by Lana Del Rey)	Rizzle Kicks	3:53
17.	"Same Love" (originally by Macklemore and Ryan Lewis featuring Mary Lambert)	Kodaline	3:49
18.	"Love Me Again" (originally by John Newman)	Nina Nesbitt	4:02
19.	"Best Song Ever" (originally by One Direction)	Gabrielle Aplin	3:28
20.	"Anything Could Happen" (originally by Ellie Goulding)	fun.	4:02

Disc two
No.	Title	Artist	Length
1.	"Blurred Lines" (originally by Robin Thicke featuring T.I and Pharrell Williams)	Vampire Weekend	4:15
2.	"Tessellate" (originally by Alt-J)	Mumford & Sons	2:59
3.	"So Good to Me" (originally by Chris Malinchak)	The 1975	3:57
4.	"Figure 8" (originally by Ellie Goulding)	Ben Howard	5:42
5.	"It's Time"	Imagine Dragons	5:42
6.	"Radioactive"	Rita Ora	4:39
7.	"Diamonds" (originally by Rihanna)	Jessie Ware	3:28
8.	"Good Time"	Owl City and Carly Rae Jepsen	3:06
9.	"Impossible" (originally by Shontelle)	K Koke featuring Daley	4:06
10.	"Thrift Shop" (originally by Macklemore and Ryan Lewis)	Theme Park	3:59
11.	"Close Enemies"	Example	4:20
12.	"Can You Hear Me? (Ayayaya)"	Wiley featuring Skepta and Ms D	2:38
13.	"Chained" (originally by The xx)	Mikky Ekko	4:00
14.	"Beneath Your Beautiful" (originally by Labrinth featuring Emeli Sande)	Misha B	3:22
15.	"Little Talks" (originally by Of Monsters and Men)	Lianne La Havas	3:27
16.	"Thinkin Bout You" (originally by Frank Ocean)	Aluna George	3:14
17.	"Try" (originally by P!nk)	Mallory Knox	3:26
18.	"The Way I Tend to Be"	Frank Turner	3:36
19.	"Wild for the Night"	A$AP Rocky	3:08
20.	"Need U (100%)" (originally by Duke Dumont featuring A*M*E)	Disclosure featuring Sam Smith	3:50

== Charts ==
Chart (2013)	Peak position
UK Compilation Albums (Official Charts)	1
