= Live Lounge Tour =

BBC Radio 1 tour

The Live Lounge Tour was a tour taken by BBC Radio 1 from 2006 to 2011 This features Jo Whiley later Fearne Cotton going to the Live Lounge artists' house, houseboat, local pub, mum's house, etc. to have a look around at a place that means something to the artist. In 2010 the Live Lounge Tour was rebranded the "Radio 1's Student Tour" with Fearne Cotton and Zane Lowe.

== 2006 ==
Air Date	Artist	Tracks Played
27 November	Lily Allen	"Naive" by The Kooks
28 November	The Kooks	
29 November	Ordinary Boys	"Girls Just Want to Have Fun" by Cyndi Lauper
30 November	Lostprophets	"Going Underground" by The Jam
1 December	Noel Gallagher	

== 2007 ==
Air Date	Artist	Tracks Played
10 December	McFly	"Born to Run" by Bruce Springsteen
11 December	Jack Penate	"1234" by Feist
12 December	Mika	
13 December	The Enemy	"Girls Just Want to Have Fun" by Cyndi Lauper
14 December	Stereophonics	"Best of You" by Foo Fighters

== 2008 ==
Air Date	Artist	Tracks Played
22 September	Adele	"Hometown Glory" "Make You Feel My Love" by Bob Dylan "Black and Gold" by Sam Sparro
23 September	Snow Patrol	"Take Back The City" "Chocolate" "One Day Like This" by Elbow
24 September	Kaiser Chiefs	"Every Day I Love You Less And Less" "Never Miss A Beat" "Time to Pretend" by MGMT
25 September	Girls Aloud	"The Promise" "Apologize" by Timbaland featuring OneRepublic
26 September	Razorlight	"Somewhere Else" "Wire to Wire" "No One Knows" by Queens of the Stone Age

== 2009 ==
Air Date	Artist	Tracks Played
14 September	Kasabian	"Underdog" "Cutt Off" "The Sweet Escape" by Gwen Stefani
15 September	JLS	"Beat Again" "Umbrella" by Rihanna "The Fear" by Lily Allen
16 September	Biffy Clyro	"The Captain" "Mountains" "Love Sex Magic" by Ciara
17 September	Dizzee Rascal	"Holiday" "Bonkers" "Dirty Cash (Money Talks)" by The Adventures of Stevie V
18 September	Jay-Z	"Encore" Roc Boys

== 2010 Student Tour ==
Air Date	Artist	Tracks Played
18 October	Mark Ronson	"The Bike Song" "We Used to Wait" by Arcade Fire
19 October	Darwin Deez	"Constellations" "Teenage Dream" by Katy Perry
20 October	Chase & Status	"Let You Go" "Prayin'" by Plan B
21 October	Klaxons	"Twin Flames" "Bad Romance" by Lady Gaga

== 2011 Student Tour ==
Air Date	Artist	Tracks Played
24 October - Aberdeen, Scotland	Noah & The Whale	"Waiting for My Chance To Come" "Paradise" by Coldplay
25 October - Hatfield, East Riding of Yorkshire	Example	"Changed the Way You Kiss Me" "We Found Love" by Rihanna
26 October - Leicester	Kasabian	"Re-Wired" "Video Games" by Lana Del Rey
27 October - Norwich	Coldplay	"Hurts Like Heaven" "We Found Love" by Rihanna "Paradise"
