= Clara Amfo =

British radio and TV presenter (born 1984)

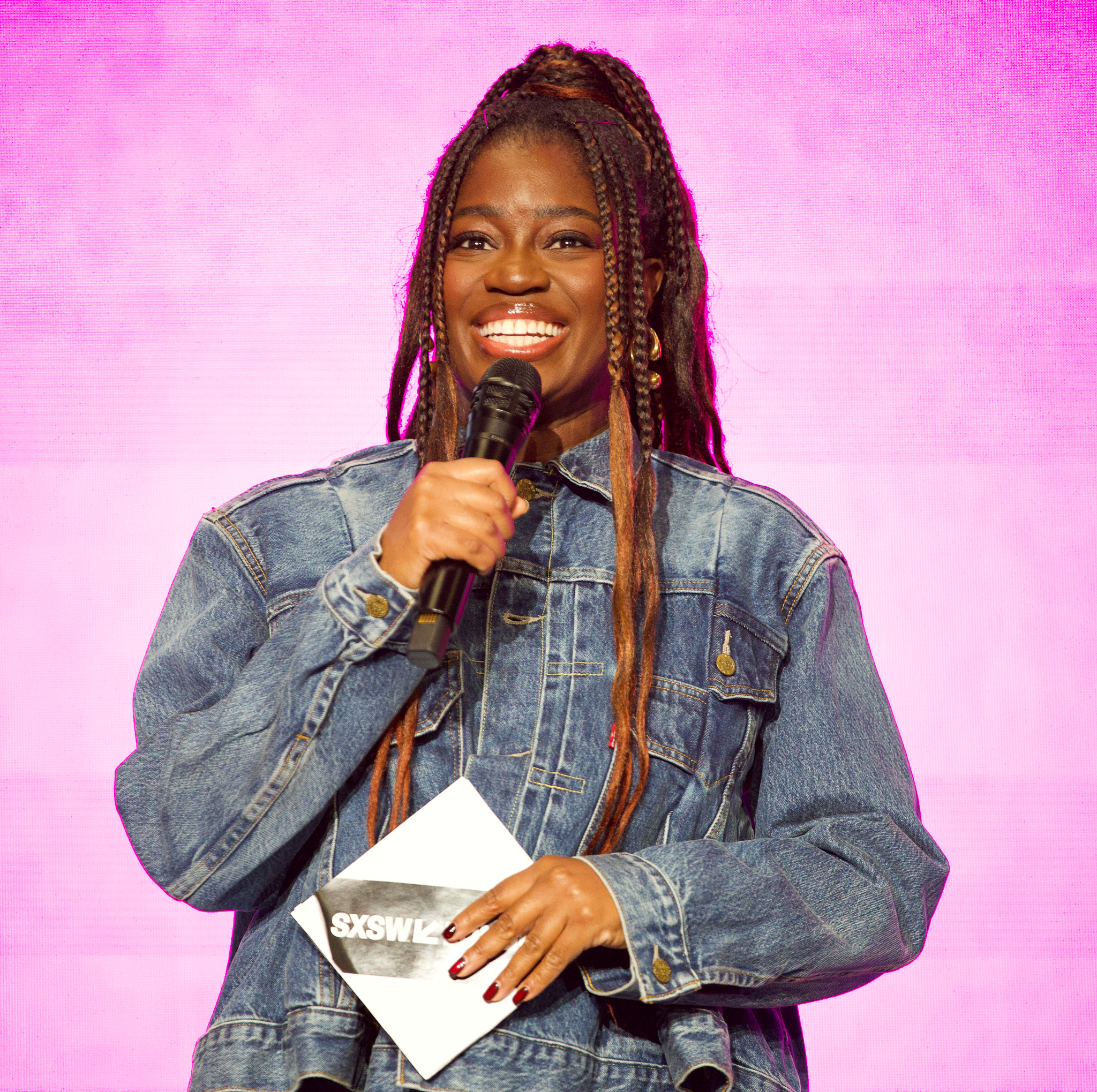
- Amfo in 2025
- Born: Kingston upon Thames, London, England
- Education: St Mary's University College
- Occupations: Radio presenter; voice-over artist; television presenter
- Years active: 2009–present
- Known for: BBC Radio 1; BBC Radio 1Xtra; BBC Radio 2
- Television: BRIT Awards; The BRITs Are Coming; Top of the Pops; The One Show
- Website: claraamfo.com

Clara Amfo is a British radio broadcaster, television presenter, podcast host and voice-over artist. She is known for presenting her shows on BBC Radio 1.

== Early life and education ==
Amfo was born to Ghanaian parents and has five siblings. Her father, who died in 2015, was an NHS microbiologist, and her mother a hospital cleaner. After leaving Holy Cross School, she went on to study media arts with professional and creative writing at St Mary's University College.

== Career ==
Amfo started out as a marketing intern at Kiss FM. She hosted the British premiere of Red Riding Hood, Baby Driver, Tomb Raider, Kingsman and Marvel's Black Panther at Hammersmith Apollo and has reported from events in the UK, including Wireless, Global Gathering, SW4 and NASS festivals. In 2012 she was nominated for a Sony Radio Award in the Rising Star category. In September 2013, Amfo joined BBC Radio 1Xtra as host of the weekend breakfast show. In 2013, she was hired as the host of MTV's weekly Official UK Top 40 and Top 20 Chart shows, as well as The Official Chart Update and Top 20. On 26 September 2013, Amfo appeared on BBC Radio 1's Innuendo Bingo.

In 2015, Amfo became the host of The Official Chart on BBC Radio 1. In February 2015 it was announced she would be taking over from Fearne Cotton as host of Radio 1's weekday mid-morning show – home of the Live Lounge – on 25 May 2015, and therefore be departing from 1Xtra's weekend breakfast show. In July 2016, Amfo became the narrator of Coach Trip on E4. In February 2017, Amfo presented backstage at the BRIT Awards for ITV2. In December 2017, she presented The Year in Music 2017 with Claudia Winkleman on BBC Two. She also presented Top of the Pops for the first time, with Fearne Cotton on BBC One. In February 2018, Amfo returned to the BRIT Awards backstage on ITV2. In June 2020, Amfo was widely praised for making a speech on her mid-morning show on BBC Radio 1, about George Floyd's murder, racism and its effect on her own mental health.

In September 2020, Amfo appeared as a contestant on the eighteenth series of Strictly Come Dancing. She was partnered with Aljaž Škorjanec. She was eliminated in week 6 of the competition; her elimination was described by judge Motsi Mabuse as the "toughest decision" of the series. Later that year, Amfo co-hosted Fashioned with fashion historian Amber Butchart; the series explored how the history of fashion relates to relates to social movements such as feminism and civil rights.

In February 2021, the paint manufacturer Dulux announced Amfo as the ambassador for the Dulux Colour of the Year 2021, Brave Ground. Amfo began presenting the Future Sounds show on Radio 1 from 30 July 2021, taking over from Annie Mac, who left the station. Rickie, Melvin and Charlie took over Amfo's Live Lounge show.

In June 2021, Amfo appeared alongside her brother, Andy, on the third series of Celebrity Gogglebox. In December 2021, Amfo appeared on the revived series of The Weakest Link and won the episode.

In February 2022, she was a guest judge on the Snatch Game episode for the first series of RuPaul's Drag Race: UK vs. the World.

In December 2023, Amfo and Raye appeared on the twelfth series of The Voice UK as guest mentors for team Anne-Marie.

In March 2024, Amfo presented her final Future Sounds programme on BBC Radio 1. In May 2024, she began hosting Studio Sessions on ITV, in which an artist takes to the stage in front of a select audience in the Blueroom, located inside the O2 Arena, with Amfo interviewing the artists between songs. Amongst those interviewed were Becky Hill, Cat Burns, Jess Glynne, Sekou, Tom Walker, Yungblud.

In November 2025, Amfo made her acting debut in a cameo as television host Ava in the BBC One drama Wild Cherry.

Amfo also been covering for [[ Trevor Nelson ]] on [[ BBC Radio 2]]

Media offices
Preceded by Jameela Jamil	BBC Radio 1 Chart show presenter 25 January 2015 – 5 July 2015	Succeeded by Greg James
