= R. Stevie Moore discography =

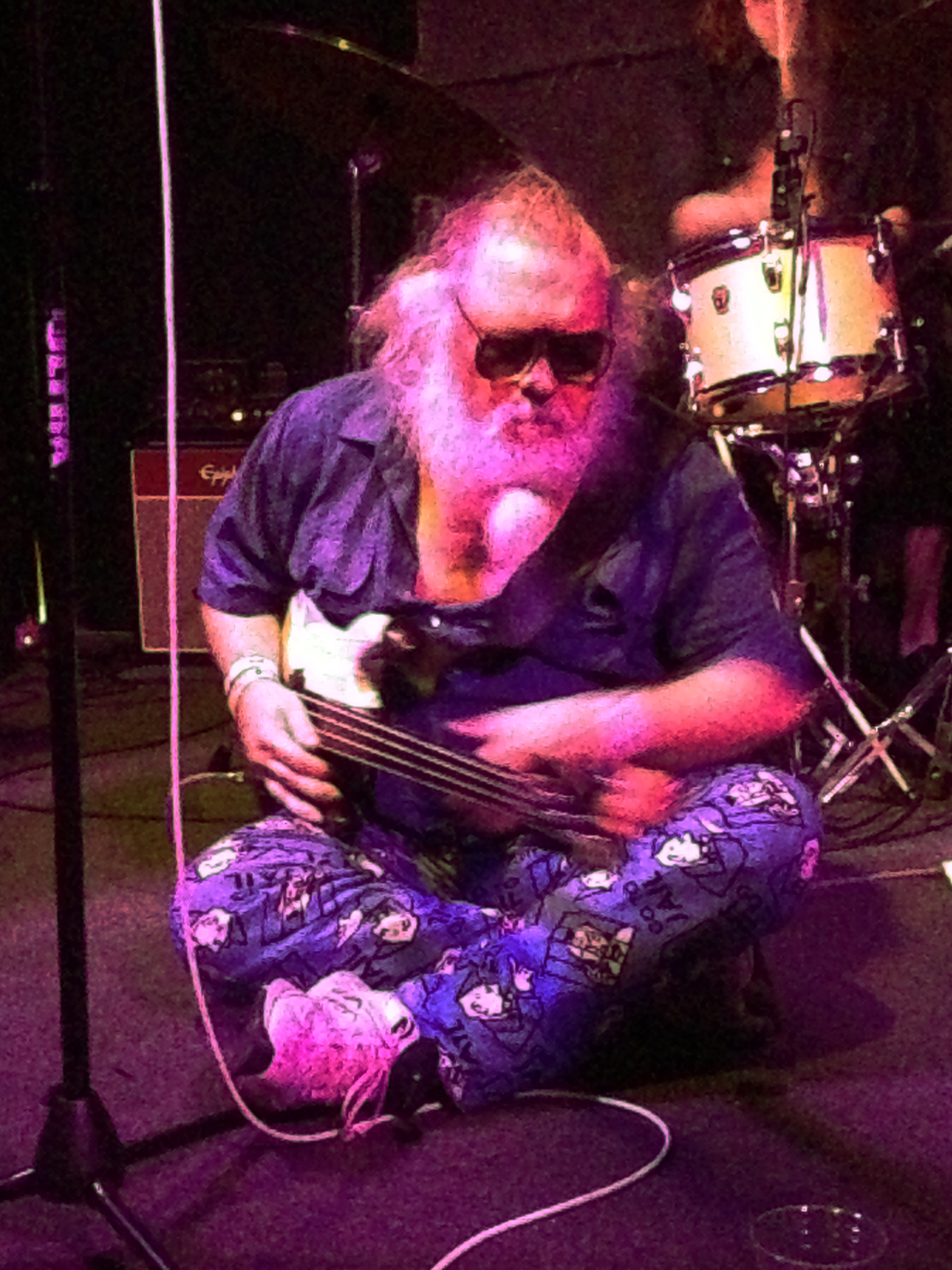
- R. Stevie Moore in 2013
- Studio albums: 158
- Compilations: 44
- Live albums: 67

This is a list of albums by R. Stevie Moore. Most are not officially released and originally only available as handmade cassettes.

== Albums ==
| Year | Title | Original label |
|---|---|---|
| 1969 | On Graycroft | self-released |
| 1972 | Homers | self-released |
| 1973 | Invites Comparison | self-released |
| 1973 | Monotheism | self-released |
| 1973 | Iconoclasm | self-released |
| 1974 | Next | self-released |
| 1975 | Stevie Moore Often | self-released |
| 1975 | Stevie Moore Or Less | self-released |
| 1975 | NTH: Instrumental Illness | self-released |
| 1975 | Stevie Does The Beatles/Apologies To Mr. Gottlieb (1974) | self-released |
| 1976 | Stevie Moore Returns | self-released |
| 1976 | Play | self-released |
| 1976 | Instrumentality/Aviation | self-released |
| 1976 | The Voice/Lake Inferior | self-released |
| 1977 | Piano Lessons | self-released |
| 1977 | Swing And A Miss | self-released |
| 1978 | Sheetrock | self-released |
| 1978 | The North | self-released |
| 1978 | Pow Wow | self-released |
| 1978 | Delicate Tension/Moore Stuff | HP Music |
| 1978 | Games & Groceries | self-released |
| 1978 | Sample For Approval | self-released |
| 1979 | R | self-released |
| 1979 | Quits | self-released |
| 1979 | Clack! | self-released |
| 1980 | Drumdrops | self-released |
| 1980 | Urgent/XVII | self-released |
| 1981 | (1952-19??) | self-released |
| 1981 | Criterions/Eek! A Mouse | self-released |
| 1981 | Dumb Philosophy | self-released |
| 1981 | Basic | self-released |
| 1981 | Pop Pain | self-released |
| 1981 | Column 88 | self-released |
| 1981 | F N I | self-released |
| 1981 | Logarithms | self-released |
| 1982 | Pioneer Paramus | self-released |
| 1982 | Pathos | self-released |
| 1982 | Themes | self-released |
| 1982 | We Love You Boxheads | self-released |
| 1982 | Privacy | self-released |
| 1982 | When | self-released |
| 1982 | You And Your Employees | self-released |
| 1982 | Toxic Shock Syndrome | self-released |
| 1982 | Pleasant Tents | self-released |
| 1982 | Boxheads 2 | self-released |
| 1982 | No Reason | self-released |
| 1982 | Trial And Error | self-released |
| 1982 | How Can You Resist R. Stevie Moore? | self-released |
| 1983 | Subject To Change | self-released |
| 1983 | W.O.M.A.N. | self-released |
| 1983 | Boxhead Gothics No. 3 | self-released |
| 1983 | Repertoire | self-released |
| 1983 | The Church Session | self-released |
| 1983 | It's What's Happening Baby! | self-released |
| 1983 | Serving Suggestion | self-released |
| 1983 | Stevedore | self-released |
| 1983 | FM FM | self-released |
| 1983 | Curiously Enough | self-released |
| 1983 | Hostile Territory | self-released |
| 1983 | Crises | self-released |
| 1983 | Musts | self-released |
| 1983 | On Standby | self-released |
| 1983 | As If Vinyl Didn't Exist | self-released |
| 1983 | Amateur Hour | self-released |
| 1983 | Solid State | self-released |
| 1984 | R. Stevie Moore Gets Off | self-released |
| 1984 | Closer Tha Never | self-released |
| 1984 | 1984U. | self-released |
| 1984 | Embarrass Paris | self-released |
| 1984 | State Of Affairs | self-released |
| 1984 | K7 | self-released |
| 1984 | Kaffeeklatsch | self-released |
| 1984 | Organ Donor | self-released |
| 1984 | Jabberwocky | self-released |
| 1985 | Skeletons | self-released |
| 1985 | Barely | self-released |
| 1985 | R. Stevie Moore's Three Blazers | self-released |
| 1985 | Umpteenth | self-released |
| 1985 | R. Stevie Moore Is Worth It | self-released |
| 1986 | The Sanctuary Sessions/Glad Music | New Rose |
| 1986 | Man Of The Year Vol. 1 | self-released |
| 1986 | Man Of The Year Vol. 2 | self-released |
| 1986 | Purpose | self-released |
| 1986 | Man Of The Year Vol. 3 | self-released |
| 1986 | Belief | self-released |
| 1986 | All Well And Good | self-released |
| 1986 | Pandemonium | self-released |
| 1987 | Googleplex | self-released |
| 1987 | Clips | self-released |
| 1987 | Teenage Spectacular | New Rose |
| 1988 | Middle Age Vernacular | self-released |
| 1988 | Effluvium | self-released |
| 1991 | Persevere | self-released |
| 1992 | Re-cital | self-released |
| 1992 | Voiced | self-released |
| 1993 | 7 Songlets | self-released |
| 1993 | Sequestered | self-released |
| 1994 | Ersatz | self-released |
| 1994 | Executive Turntable | self-released |
| 1994 | Goosebumps | self-released |
| 1994 | Who Cares? | self-released |
| 1994 | Absinthe | self-released |
| 1994 | A New Day Of Restoration | self-released |
| 1994 | Herculean Rationale | self-released |
| 1994 | May | self-released |
| 1995 | Fundraiser | self-released |
| 1995 | Chapter Eleven | self-released |
| 1995 | Phlegm Soundtrack | self-released |
| 1995 | In One Ear And Out The Other | self-released |
| 1995 | Element | self-released |
| 1995 | An Afternoon With R. Stevie Moore | self-released |
| 1995 | Dull | self-released |
| 1996 | The Day The Earth Stood On Stilts | self-released |
| 1996 | Vague | self-released |
| 1996 | Really? | self-released |
| 1997 | Plight | self-released |
| 1997 | Disturbed | self-released |
| 1997 | Senior Superlatives | self-released |
| 1998 | Comeback Special | self-released |
| 1999 | I'll Say It's My Fault | self-released |
| 2000 | Love Compartment | self-released |
| 2001 | The Jinx | self-released |
| 2001 | Midi-Bran Piano Rolls | self-released |
| 2003 | Report Card | self-released |
| 2004 | Conscientious Objector | self-released |
| 2004 | Far Out | self-released |
| 2004 | Save R. Stevie | self-released |
| 2005 | Aesthetic | self-released |
| 2005 | Platformat | self-released |
| 2005 | Sister Krys | self-released |
| 2005 | Difficult Personality | self-released |
| 2006 | Albeit | self-released |
| 2006 | Zeitgeist | self-released |
| 2006 | Tell Laura I Love Herbert | self-released |
| 2006 | Disorganized Overactivity Or Tabitha Soren | self-released |
| 2006 | Hear Lies | self-released |
| 2007 | Moored | self-released |
| 2007 | Downplaying My Significance | self-released |
| 2008 | A.W.O.L. | self-released |
| 2008 | Fukt! | self-released |
| 2009 | Fakebook | self-released |
| 2009 | Sentimental Ties | self-released |
| 2009 | Coo Coo Rockin Time | self-released |
| 2010 | Errorism | self-released |
| 2010 | Monotheism 2010 | self-released |
| 2010 | Text Rage | self-released |
| 2010 | Rodan | self-released |
| 2010 | Mind Crack | self-released |
| 2010 | Space Bar | self-released |
| 2011 | Advanced | 2000 Records |
| 2011 | Advanst | self-released |
| 2012 | Please Leave | self-released |
| 2012 | LUNATIKFRINJ | self-released |
| 2012 | Free Pussy Riot | self-released |
| 2012 | Control Panel | self-released |
| 2013 | Burst Upon The Scene | self-released |
| 2013 | New World Elder | self-released |
| 2013 | Genital Juice | self-released |
| 2013 | Oral Roberts | self-released |
| 2013 | Dilletante Field Trip Bully | self-released |
| 2013 | ENNUI | self-released |
| 2013 | May I Be Excused? | self-released |
| 2013 | Spoiler Alert | self-released |
| 2014 | Price Check Moore's Code ~ Freedom Now | self-released |
| 2014 | Epiglottis Captcha Fracking | self-released |
| 2014 | Lymph Nodes | self-released |
| 2014 | Fifteen Tons | self-released |
| 2015 | Make It Be (with Jason Falkner) | Bar/None |
| 2015 | Knickerbocker Thuggery Combover | self-released |
| 2015 | New Age Sewage Anticeptic Tank | self-released |
| 2015 | ENGLITCH | self-released |
| 2015 | Drip and Dribble (draft) | self-released |
| 2016 | (we could be) "Gyros" (just for 1 day) | self-released |
| 2016 | NO WORLD WE'RE FOR | self-released |
| 2016 | What Can I Say? | self-released |
| 2016 | Product Item Diary | self-released |
| 2016 | Barista Parlor Golden Sound | self-released |
| 2016 | Amnesia Insomnia Shania | self-released |
| 2016 | Unamericana Survival Strategys | self-released |
| 2017 | Nobody Pays Me Much Mind (Until I'm Gone) | self-released |
| 2017 | When dja Get Back | self-released |
| 2017 | MUSICITY | self-released |
| 2018 | The Embodiment of Progressive Ideals (with Alan Jenkins and the Kettering Vampires) | Cordelia |
| 2018 | Oatmeal Goatmilk | self-released |
| 2018 | Emotion Picture | self-released |
| 2018 | Cancel & Gretel | self-released |
| 2018 | The Here..... with neon black | self-released |
| 2018 | WORLD WAR FOUR (The Best Of) | self-released |
| 2018 | NAP | self-released |
| 2019 | Afterlife | Bar/None |

== Compilations ==
| Year | Title | Original label |
|---|---|---|
| 1976 | Phonography | Vital |
| 1978 | Delicate Tension | H.P. Music |
| 1983 | This Was R. Stevie Moore: The First Ten Years | self-released |
| 1983 | Ass-ault (Dollar Tape) | self-released |
| 1983 | Rarities | self-released |
| 1983 | Country Disguises | self-released |
| 1983 | More Moore Versions | self-released |
| 1983 | Lost And Found | self-released |
| 1983 | Comp Tapes | self-released |
| 1984 | Greatest Hits | self-released |
| 1984 | Everything You Wanted To Know About R. Stevie Moore But Were Afraid To Ask | New Rose |
| 1984 | What's The Point?!! | Cuneiform |
| 1985 | Verve | Hamster |
| 1987 | R. Stevie Moore (1952-19??) | Cordelia |
| 1988 | Warning | New Rose |
| 1990 | Has-Beens and Never-Weres | Heliotrope |
| 1990 | Greatesttits | Fan Club |
| 1993 | Contact Risk | Fruit of the Tune |
| 1994 | Unpopular Singer Vol. 1 | self-released |
| 1994 | Unpopular Singer Vol. 2 | self-released |
| 1994 | Unpopular Singer Vol. 3 | self-released |
| 1995 | Revolve | Pink Lemon |
| 1995 | Unpopular Singer Vol. 4 | self-released |
| 1999 | The Future Is Worse Than The Past | Megaphon |
| 2000 | The Essential R. Stevie Moore | self-released |
| 2000 | More Essential | self-released |
| 2002 | Essential V.3 | self-released |
| 2002 | Hundreds of Hiding Places | Megaphon |
| 2003 | Hobbies Galore | self-released |
| 2003 | Nevertheless Optimistic | Innova |
| 2004 | Tra La La La Phooey | Comfort Stand |
| 2006 | Thoroughly Years (Phonography 2) | Hamster |
| 2007 | Unpopular Singer Vol. 6 | self-released |
| 2007 | R. Stevie Moore Sings Ford Theatre | iTunes |
| 2008 | Meet The R. Stevie Moore | Cherry Red |
| 2008 | Myth Of Melody | self-released |
| 2008 | Special Needs | Park the Van |
| 2009 | Me Too | Cherry Red |
| 2012 | Lo Fi Hi Fives ...A Kind Of Best Of | OGenesis Records |
| 2012 | Hearing Aid | Megaphone |
| 2013 | Personal Appeal | Care in the Community |
| 2013 | Once and For All | Megaphon/Moloko |
| 2013 | In The History of Ever | Oma333 |
| 2014 | WET PAINT | I Thought You Were a Marxist Records |

== Live albums ==
| Year | Title |
|---|---|
| 1980 | Hurrah's (NYC) |
| 1983 | R. Stevie Moore & The Rayvens 1 (Folk City NYC) |
| 1983 | R. Stevie Moore & The Rayvens 2 (Maxwell's, Hoboken NJ) |
| 1983 | Boxheads 4: Broadcast (WFMU, East Orange NJ) |
| 1984 | The Biggest Names In Show Business (WFMU) |
| 1984 | Olives And More (WFMU) |
| 1984 | The Scott And Gary Show (NYC Cable TV) |
| 1984 | In Person (The Jetty, Bloomfield NJ) |
| 1984 | Folk City, NYC |
| 1984 | 120 Nuits (Live at Paris) |
| 1984 | The Bitter End, NYC |
| 1984 | Boston, The Channel |
| 1984 | The Dive, NYC |
| 1985 | Two Evenings With R. Stevie Moore In New York (Irving Plaza/Folk City) |
| 1985 | The Jetty Vol. 2 |
| 1985 | Radio Performance (WFMU) |
| 1986 | R. Stevie Moore Sings At Speakeasy |
| 1986 | Speakeasy Vol. 2 |
| 1986 | Last Live Show/Lone Star Cafe |
| 1987 | RSM: Live On WFMU |
| 1993 | RSM On WFMU |
| 1993 | Maxwell's |
| 1997 | RSM Live '97 (Mother NYC/Tierney's NJ) |
| 1997 | RSMKO Sing, Stork Club, WFMU |
| 1997 | Baggot Inn/Knitting Factory NYC |
| 1998 | Tonic, NYC |
| 1998 | Stork Club, WFMU |
| 1998 | Weird NJ At Maxwell's |
| 1999 | WRVU, Vanderbilt, Nashville |
| 1999 | Sutler, Nashville |
| 1999 | Mercury Lounge, NYC |
| 1999 | RSM And The Bees, Darress Theater NJ |
| 2000 | Maxwell's Y2K |
| 2000 | Maxwell's Again |
| 2001 | Nova Nights |
| 2002 | Madison TN High School Gym, Taxmen Reunion |
| 2002 | Maxwell's IPO |
| 2003 | Fez NYC |
| 2003 | Life On WFMU, With Kenny G |
| 2003 | Maxwell's |
| 2004 | GKS Brooklyn |
| 2004 | Dr. Demento Show, B.B. King's, NYC |
| 2004 | Acme Underground NYC, IPO w/Breetles |
| 2004 | Tonic w/Ariel Pink |
| 2005 | Serena Bar, Chelsea Hotel, NYC |
| 2005 | West End, NYC |
| 2005 | Tonic w/Ariel Pink #2 |
| 2005 | BSR FM Phone-In (Home Alone) |
| 2006 | Tonic, NYC |
| 2007 | Knitting Factory Tap Bar, NYC |
| 2007 | Maxwell's |
| 2007 | Knitting Factory |
| 2008 | Cake Shop |
| 2008 | Music Hall Of Williamsburg/Bowery Ballroom |
| 2008 | Coco66 |
| 2008 | Cake Shop #2 |
| 2008 | Cake Shop #3 |
| 2008 | Cake Shop #4 |
| 2008 | Knitting Factory |
| 2008 | Death By Audio |
| 2008 | Surreal Estate |
| 2009 | Maxwell's |
| 2009 | Sputnik |
| 2009 | Cake Shop |
| 2009 | Kenny's Castaways |
| 2010 | Mercury Lounge |
| 2010 | Bruar Falls |

== Singles/EPs ==
| Year | Title |
|---|---|
| 1973 | "Roger Ferguson & Ethos" (Basic Sounds Ltd.) |
| 1977 | Four From Phonography EP (H.P. Music) |
| 1978 | Stance EP (H.P. Music) |
| 1978 | "Goodbye Piano"/"I Wish I Could Sing" (Flamingo) |
| 1978 | "Cannot Keep My Fingers Out Of My Mouth"/"Groceries" |
| 1979 | "New Wave"/"Same" (Classass Music Industries) |
| 1984 | "Chantilly Lace" + "Teen Routines"/"Bloody Knuckles" (New Rose) |
| 1992 | "I Hate People"/"Everyone But Everyone" (Singles Only Label) |
| 2001 | Colliding Circles EP |
| 2001 | A Clever Combo (The Breetles) EP |
| 2001 | Frank Balesteria EP |
| 2002 | Alma Mater, The Mighty Rams EP |
| 2002 | You Must Be Out Of My Mind EP |
| 2002 | Horse In Striped Pajamas |
| 2003 | A White Shade Of Pale EP |
| 2003 | Five Minutes More EP |
| 2006 | Encyclopediac 3 EP |
| 2009 | "U.R. True"/"How Many Moore" b/w "Advertising Agency Of Fucking"/"Oh Pat" (OGenesis) |
| 2009 | "Came Twice" (Spunky Monkey Music) |
| 2009 | "Pop Rock Logic" (Spunky Monkey Music) |
| 2011 | "You Came Along Just In Time" (People In A Position To Know Records) |
| 2011 | "Me Too" b/w "Nothing Is As It Was" (Slowboy Records) |
| 2011 | "Pop Music" b/w "Love Is The Way To My Heart" (OGenesis) |
| 2012 | SteviePink Javascript (with Ariel Pink) (People In A Position To Know Records) |
| 2012 | Ku Klux Glam E.P. (Slowboy Records) |
| 2012 | "Post Break-Up Sex" Split 7" w/The Vaccines (OGenesis) |
| 2012 | "Advertising Agency Of Fucking" b/w "Conflict Of Interest" (People In A Position To Know Records) |
| 2012 | "How Many Moore?" b/w "Who You Gonna Do-do On Today?" (People In A Position To Know Records) |
| 2012 | "Little Man" b/w "Dirty Woman" (People In A Position To Know Records) |
| 2012 | "E Not Laid" b/w "Inconsiderations Pt. 1" (People In A Position To Know Records) |
| 2012 | "A To The S On The A By The P" b/w "Actually I Do Must Leave" (People In A Position To Know Records) |
| 2015 | "Boysage" Split 7" w/Boys Age (Border Series / Bleeding Gold) |
| 2015 | "Coming Up" (with Supercute!) (People In A Position To Know Records) |

== Other recordings ==
| Year | Title |
|---|---|
| 1969 | Grease |
| 1969 | The Sound Of Fugto |
| 1969 | Unleashed Ignorance In Bb Minor Augmented |
| 1969 | The Marlborough Sings |
| 1971 | Jones w/Victor Lovera |
| 1971 | Eenque w/Lovera |
| 1972 | All Twenty Minutes w/Lovera |
| 1972 | Goods w/Herald |
| 1972 | Prethos w/Lovera |
| 1973 | Mere Static/Planet 81 w/Lovera |
| 1973 | Ob Newschk w/Lovera |
| 1974 | Ethos 1 & 2 w/Lovera |
| 1974 | Studio Ethos w/Lovera |
| 1974 | Phoney |
| 1975 | Stevie Does The Beatles |
| 1975 | Eros Ethos w/Lovera |
| 1976 | Smashers w/Lovera |
| 1982 | Candid Cassette |
| 1983 | Under The Covers |
| 1984 | Boota Theatre |
| 1984 | Messy Merci Me |
| 1984 | Rare Radio Interviews |
| 1986 | Dubs One/Say Man |
| 1986 | Dubs Two |
| 1997 | Objectivity w/Yukio Yung (JAR Music) |
| 1999 | Dates w/Dave Gregory |
| 1999 | Watch: Gore/Moore w/Bryan Gore |
| 1997 | FairMoore w/Jad Fair (Old Gold) |
| 2006 | Manuscription w/Lane Steinberg |
| 2006 | The Yung & Moore Show w/Yukio Yung |
| 2009 | Stop Them w/BJanoff |
| 2011 | Stalactites & Stalagmites w/Tropical Ooze |
| 2012 | Ku Klux Glam w/Ariel Pink |
| 2012 | Wedding Album w/Keel Her |
| 2014 | Round Eye w/ Round Eye |
