= Disturbed (disambiguation) =

Disturbed is an American heavy metal band formed in 1994.

Disturbed may also refer to:

== Film and television ==
- Disturbed (film), a 1990 American horror film
- "Disturbed" (Numbers), a 2009 TV episode
- "The Disturbed" (Deadly Women), a 2009 TV episode

== Music ==
- Disturbed (album), an album by Coo Coo Cal, or the title song, 2001
- Disturbed, an album by R. Stevie Moore, 1997
- "Disturbed", a song by Peter Gabriel from Passion, 1989
- "Disturbed", a song by Sugababes from the B-side of the single "In the Middle", 2004

== Literature ==
- Disturbed, a 2011 novel by Kevin O'Brien

== See also ==
- Mental illness
- Disturbance (disambiguation)
