= Phonography =

Phonography, meaning "sound writing" in Greek, may refer to:

- The use of a phonograph
- Phonemic orthography
- Pitman shorthand, sometimes called phonography, a system of shorthand stenography developed by Isaac Pitman
- Phonography, a neologism used by some to refer to field recording
- Phonography (album), the 1976 debut album by R. Stevie Moore
- "Phonography", a bonus track on Britney Spears' 2008 album Circus
