= Ruth's Refrigerator =

English rock band

Ruth's Refrigerator were a psychedelic rock/indie pop band from Leicester, England, formed in 1990 as a collaboration between guitarist/songwriter Alan Jenkins (of The Deep Freeze Mice and The Chrysanthemums), singer/guitarist Ruth Miller and bassist Terri Lowe (both of Po!), keyboardist (and Jenkins' future wife) Blodwyn P. Teabag, and drummer Robyn Gibson (formerly of The Ammonites). The band released two albums, 1990's Suddenly a Disfigured Head Parachuted and 1991's A Lizard Is a Submarine on Grass, featuring new songs and reworkings of Deep Freeze Mice, Po! and Originals (another of Lowe's former bands) tracks.

They split up in 1992, with Miller, Jenkins, Teabag, and Gibson going on to form Jody & The Creams, later minus Miller as The Creams, and Jenkins later forming The Thurston Lava Tube.

== Discography ==
- Suddenly a Disfigured Head Parachuted (1990) Madagascar
- A Lizard Is a Submarine on Grass (1991) Madagascar

The original vinyl and CD editions of A Lizard Is a Submarine on Grass are (aside from one track) separate recordings of mostly the same material, often with substantially different arrangements. Both versions, together with some unused takes, were included on a 2CD reissue of the album on Alan Jenkins' Cordelia Records in 2017.
