= Why Should I Love You? =

2012 single by R. Stevie Moore

Song by R. Stevie Moore

from the album Glad Music
- Released: February 21, 1986
- Genre: Power pop, lo-fi
- Length: 3:23
- Label: New Rose
- Songwriter(s): R. Stevie Moore
- Producer(s): R. Stevie Moore

"Why Should I Love You?" is a song written by American singer-songwriter R. Stevie Moore, released as the ninth track of his album Glad Music (1986). It was announced in May 2012 that the track would also appear on Lo Fi Hi Fives ...A Kind Of Best Of, a hits collection from Moore; scheduled for a release on August 5, 2012.

== The Vaccines version ==
"Why Should I Love You?"

Single by The Vaccines
- Released: 21 April 2012
- Recorded: 2012
- Genre: Indie rock
- Length: 3:14
- Label: O Genesis Recordings
- Songwriter(s): R. Stevie Moore

The Vaccines singles chronology
"Wetsuit / Tiger Blood" (2011)	"Why Should I Love You?" (2012)	"No Hope" (2012)

"Why Should I Love You?" was covered by London-based quartet The Vaccines. The track was released in the United Kingdom on 21 April 2012 as a double A-side with Moore's cover of "Post Break-Up Sex" (2011); and was limited to 500 copies in accordance with Record Store Day 2012. The band's cover of "Why Should I Love You?" received its first play on 4 April 2012, when it featured as BBC Radio 1 DJ Zane Lowe's Hottest Record in the World.

Track listing

7" vinyl
No.	Title	Writer(s)	Length
1.	"Why Should I Love You?" (R. Stevie Moore)	R. Stevie Moore	3:14
2.	"Post Break-Up Sex" (The Vaccines)	The Vaccines	2:39

Release history

Region	Date	Format
United Kingdom	4 April 2012	Radio airplay
United Kingdom	21 April 2012	Vinyl
