= Bunnage =

Bunnage is an English surname. Notable people with the surname include:

- Avis Bunnage (1923–1990), English actress
- Mick Bunnage (born 1958), British cartoonist
