= Lo Fi Hi Fives =

Lo Fi Hi Fives... A Kind of Best Of...

Compilation album by R. Stevie Moore
- Released: August 6, 2012
- Recorded: 1975–2012
- Label: O Genesis
- Producer: R. Stevie Moore

R. Stevie Moore chronology
Ku Klux Glam (2012)	Lo Fi Hi Fives... A Kind of Best Of... (2012)	Hearing Aid (2012)

Professional ratings
Review scores
Source	Rating
The Guardian	5/5 stars
Pitchfork	7.4/10

Lo Fi Hi Fives... A Kind of Best Of... is a 2012 compilation by American multi-instrumentalist R. Stevie Moore. It was released in the UK on the O Genesis label.

The songs on this album are taken from 37 years of material. The album was compiled by R. Stevie along with Tim Burgess on Tim's label O Genesis Recordings - O Genesis already released a split single of him and the Vaccines and soon released a single of "Pop Music". The album features cameos by Irwin Chusid, Ariel Pink, Terry Burrows, Lane Steinberg, and friends/fellow Ethos bandmates Billy Anderson and Roger Ferguson.

== Track listing ==
Track sources are provided by Moore.

No.	Title	Original album	Length
1.	"Pop Music"	Advanced (2011)
2.	"Show Biz Is Dead"	Dumb Philosophy (1982)
3.	"Why Should I Love You?"	Glad Music (1986)
4.	"Dutch Me"	Ku Klux Glam (2012)
5.	"Big Mistake"	Conscientious Objector (2004)
6.	"The Winner"	Stevie Moore Returns (1975)
7.	"Here Comes Summer Again"	Swing and a Miss (1978)
8.	"Hurry Up"	Errorism (2010)
9.	"I Go Into Your Mind"	The Yung & Moore Show (2006)
10.	"Another Day Slips Away"	Tell Laura I Love Herbert (2006)
11.	"You And Me"	Stevie Moore or Less (1974)
12.	"Sentimental Ties"	Sentimental TIes (2009)
13.	"Little Man"	Stevie Moore Returns (1975)
14.	"Find Any"	Errorism (2010)
