= Teenage Spectacular =

Studio album by R. Stevie Moore
- Released: November 1987
- Recorded: 1986
- Genre: Psychedelic pop, punk rock
- Length: 50:00
- Label: New Rose (FR)
- Producer: R. Stevie Moore

R. Stevie Moore chronology
(1952-19??) (1987)	Teenage Spectacular (1987)	Warning (1988)

Professional ratings
Review scores
Source	Rating
AllMusic	4/5 stars
The Encyclopedia of Popular Music	3/5 stars
New Musical Express	1/10

Teenage Spectacular is a 12" vinyl record album by DIY home recording pioneer and one-man band R. Stevie Moore, released in 1987. It was the third of four RSM albums released by New Rose Records in Paris, France. Like 1986's Glad Music, Teenage Spectacular differed from most Moore record albums by being almost exclusively recorded in a professional 8 & 16 track studio. It was officially reissued on compact disc by Cordelia Records.

== Critical reception ==
AllMusic called the album "a generally strong selection of songs boasting a broad array of styles, strikingly unusual and effective chord progressions, wry and clever lyrics, and inventive arrangements." Trouser Press wrote that "the simple musical constructions on guitars, keyboards and drums reveal traces of Moore’s many influences — from the Beatles to Todd Rundgren to the Bonzos to XTC and back again — and huge chunks of his monumental creative grasp."

== Track listing ==
All songs by Moore, except as indicated (in parentheses).

Plate 1

1. "The Bodycount" (3:32)
2. "Hobbies Galore" (4:16)
3. "Blues for Cathy Taylor" (3:51)
4. "Cover of "Rolling Stone"" (Shel Silverstein) (4:23)
5. "Everyone but Everyone" (6:55)
6. "On the Spot" (3:32)
7. "Non Sequiturs" (1:40)

Plate 2

1. "I Love You Too Much to Bother You" (3:12)
2. "All Well and Good"/"Love Is for the Birds" (7:01)
3. "Who Killed Davey Moore?" (Bob Dylan) (6:21)
4. "Baby on Board" (2:26)
5. "No Know" (3:01)
6. "Hours of Delight" (1:37)
7. "Play Myself Some Music" (3:47)
8. "Non Sequiturs" (1:11)
