= Verve (R. Stevie Moore album) =

Studio album by R. Stevie Moore
- Released: Sept 1985
- Recorded: 1976–1984
- Genre: Psychedelic pop, punk rock, lo-fi
- Length: 50:35
- Label: Hamster (UK)
- Producer: RSM

R. Stevie Moore chronology
What's The Point?!! (1984)	Verve (1985)	Glad Music (1986)

Verve is the fifth 12" vinyl record album by DIY home recording pioneer and one-man band R. Stevie Moore. It was released by Terry Burrows' Hamster label in the UK late 1985. Officially reissued 2016 on compact disc by Cordelia Records.

== Track listing ==
=== Side one ===
1. "I Want You in My Life" (2:21)
2. "The Most Powerful Statement in History" (6:26)
3. "Everything" (2:56)
4. "Feisty Schoolmarm" (3:03)
5. "Pledge Your Money" (2:56)
6. "Splem Jeague 3" (1:20)
7. "I'm Bored" (3:17)
8. "There Is No God in America (part 1)" (3:08)

=== Side two ===
1. "There Is No God in America (part 2)" (1:40)
2. "The Crystal Chandelier" (5:30)
3. "Steve" (3:11)
4. "Defeating the Purpose" (live) (1:41)
5. "Just a Little Kid" (0:27)
6. "Curiously Enough" (excerpt)/ "Kaleidoscopics" (excerpt) (4:37)
7. "I See Star" (4:35)
8. "Who Deserves It?" (3:25)
