= Ku Klux Glam =

Studio album by Ariel Pink & R. Stevie Moore
- Released: February 12, 2012
- Recorded: 2001–2011
- Label: Bandcamp

Ariel Pink chronology
| Before Today (2011) | Ku Klux Glam (2012) | Mature Themes (2012) |

R. Stevie Moore chronology
| Ariel Pink's Picks Vol. 1 (2011) | Ku Klux Glam (2012) | Lo Fi Hi Fives (2012) |

Ku Klux Glam is the first collaborative album by American musicians Ariel Pink and R. Stevie Moore, self-released on Bandcamp on February 12, 2012. Some of it was recorded with Jason Falkner, who engineered and performed on several tracks. On April 30, the album was officially issued by Stroll On Records as a limited edition cassette that condensed its original 60-track running order to 20. In June 2016, the album was given its first vinyl pressing.

== Track listing ==
| No. | Title | Length |
|---|---|---|
| 1. | "Desperation Passion intro" | 0:23 |
| 2. | "Dutch Me" | 2:43 |
| 3. | "No Zipper" | 3:24 |
| 4. | "Come My Way" | 3:04 |
| 5. | "Desperation Passion" | 1:38 |
| 6. | "I Love to Meet People, I Hate to Know Them" | 2:31 |
| 7. | "P" | 0:21 |
| 8. | "Whunt12for3" | 1:49 |
| 9. | "Cherrybaby Come Out 2night" | 2:18 |
| 10. | "Desperation Passion dos" | 1:06 |
| 11. | "Lo-Fi No Cry" | 2:14 |
| 12. | "Fadermasturbater" | 3:44 |
| 13. | "Jacuzzi Spa" | 2:15 |
| 14. | "Steviepink Javascript" | 5:56 |
| 15. | "MG82cx" | 3:06 |
| 16. | "Carmen Come On" | 2:55 |
| 17. | "Haunted Graffridgerator" | 2:26 |
| 18. | "Bar-B-Cutie Klux Clamsauce" | 8:29 |
| 19. | "Desperation Passion g1" | 1:09 |
| 20. | "Doldreams" | 1:16 |
| 21. | "Desperation Passion g2" | 0:45 |
| 22. | "I Hope That You Premember" | 3:05 |
| 23. | "What Else Am I Not Supposed To Do?" | 1:55 |
| 24. | "Breakfast Burrito Deluxe" | 1:59 |
| 25. | "Breakfast Burrito Deluxe dos" | 1:55 |
| 26. | "Breakfast Burrito Deluxe tres" | 1:58 |
| 27. | "Sacred Snow duo" | 0:59 |
| 28. | "IN PEICES [sic]" | 5:26 |
| 29. | "Decision 2012" | 1:10 |
| 30. | "R. Stevie's Brain FLAC" | 3:06 |
| 31. | "SteviePink Javascript Redo Theme" | 6:21 |
| 32. | "Ariel's Brain" | 0:18 |
| 33. | "Organ Trumpet Tower" | 0:54 |
| 34. | "Pull" | 0:29 |
| 35. | "Desperation Passion g1/2" | 1:06 |
| 36. | "Nostradamus Camus" | 2:16 |
| 37. | "Another No Answer" | 5:12 |
| 38. | "Haunted Graffridgerator KKG KGB" | 1:41 |
| 39. | "Nu Wav" | 2:22 |
| 40. | "Nostradamus Sumac" | 2:11 |
| 41. | "Sacred Snow ap" | 1:00 |
| 42. | "Sacred Snow rs" | 0:54 |
| 43. | "Sherrybaby rmx" | 4:41 |
| 44. | "Decisions rmx" | 1:11 |
| 45. | "Computer Spunkfest" | 1:03 |
| 46. | "Barbacutie rmx" | 4:04 |
| 47. | "Pull rmx" | 0:36 |
| 48. | "P rmx" | 1:53 |
| 49. | "Desperation Passion rmx" | 1:57 |
| 50. | "Uncomfortable" | 1:20 |
| 51. | "Jacuzzi Spa rmx" | 1:14 |
| 52. | "Bedroom Rock And Roll" | 6:06 |
| 53. | "Dutch Me Kareoak Me" | 2:45 |
| 54. | "Horne Of Plenty" | 0:51 |
| 55. | "Maushaus" | 0:37 |
| 56. | "Spring Break Lucky Streak" | 3:24 |
| 57. | "Douche Me (Keel Her)" | 3:33 |
| 58. | "Chasing An Echo" | 3:26 |
| 59. | "Zipper Riff" | 0:19 |
| 60. | "Me 2" | 0:38 |
| 61. | "R. Stevie Moore, Ariel Pink - Birds In My Tree" | 6:56 |
| 62. | "Closing Credits" | 3:54 |
| 63. | ""you make me very uncomfortable"" | 0:31 |

== See also ==
- Scared Famous/FF»
