= Ariel Pink's Picks Vol. 1 =

Compilation album by R. Stevie Moore
- Released: 2011
- Recorded: c. 1973–1984
- Label: Dark Side Family Jams / Laughable Recordings
- Compiler: Ariel Pink

R. Stevie Moore chronology
Advanced (2011)	Ariel Pink's Picks Vol. 1 (2011)	Ku Klux Glam (2012)

Ariel Pink's Picks Vol. 1 is a compilation album of American recording artist R. Stevie Moore. Originally compiled by Ariel Pink in 2006, the album was officially released on cassette by Laughable Recordings in 2011. A double-vinyl release on Light in the Attic followed in 2015. Release sourced and liner notes curated by Nick Noto (Ariel Pink's Dark Side).

== Track listing ==
Track sources are provided by Moore.

No.	Title	Original album	Length
1.	"Mason Jar"	Stevie Moore Returns (1976)	4:22
2.	"Don't Be Ridiculous"	Sample for Approval (1978)	2:02
3.	"She's Dead"	Swing and a Miss (1977)	3:03
4.	"Girl Go"	The North (1978)	3:31
5.	"Come My Way"	Stevie Moore Returns (1976)	2:58
6.	"Here Comes Summer Again"	Swing and a Miss (1977)	4:36
7.	"Father Goes"	Stevie Moore or Less (1975)	6:24
8.	"We're in Vietnam"	Play (1976)	4:27
9.	"My Bad Music"	R. Stevie Moore Quits (1979)	5:29
10.	"Right Perfume Wrong Mouthwash"	Themes (1982)	2:49
11.	"Benefit Of The Doubt"	Play (1976)	4:10
12.	"The Winner"	Stevie Moore Returns (1976)	3:31
13.	"Cuss Me Out"	Sheetrock (1978)	3:11
14.	"I See Stars"	K7 (1984)	4:42
15.	"Johna's Theme"	Stevie Moore Often/Pica Elite (1975)	3:16
16.	"Safe, Reliable, and Courteous"	Play (1976)	8:39
17.	"No Zipper"	Stevie Moore Invites Comparison (1973)	4:09
