= The Chrysanthemums (band) =

English band

The Chrysanthemums in Vienna, 1991

The Chrysanthemums are an English art-pop group. The project began as a collaboration between multi-instrumentalist Terry Burrows (known in the band as "Yukio Yung") and Alan Jenkins, the leader of The Deep Freeze Mice. The first releases were performed in the studio by Burrows and Jenkins alone. Other personnel were gradually added, including Vladimir Zajkowiecz on bass, Robyn Gibson (now lead singer with The Junipers) on drums and Jonathan Lemon on keyboards, enabling them to complete several tours of mainland Europe, where there was most interest in their work.

The music can be characterized as a blend of psychedelic pop, punk and elements of progressive rock. Lyrics are often surreal, and delivered by Burrows in classic laconic English tones reminiscent of Ray Davies, Robyn Hitchcock or Syd Barrett. The group's 1992 album Odessey and Oracle was a cover album of The Zombies' 1968 LP of the same title.

The original band became inactive in the mid-1990s. Burrows and Zajkowiecz later reconnected - along with Andy Ward, drummer with Camel, Marillion and The Bevis Frond - to record an album and single as Chrys&themums, creating a sound largely indistinguishable from the band's earlier releases - as have subsequent Yukio Yung solo albums. Burrows and Jenkins resumed recording as The Chrysanthemums in 2015, resulting in the 2022 album Decoy for a Dognapper!, a rock opera based on an episode of the cartoon series Scooby-Doo, Where Are You!.

Burrows has continued to record as Yukio Yung but works predominantly experimental music. Since the late-1990s he has also become a prolific and successful author. Jenkins formed The Creams and opened a recording studio in Leicester, England. Among his most recent projects were guitar instrumental band, The Thurston Lava Tube and Vril, an experimental surf band founded by Rock in Opposition pioneer Chris Cutler.

A number of The Chrysanthemums' tracks also feature R. Stevie Moore, cult one-man-band and pioneer of lo-fi home recording. Moore and Burrows have recorded together frequently as The Yung & Moore Show.

AllMusic describes The Chrysanthemums as "the very definition of 'cult favorites' ... the sort of group who inspire loyalty among a small band of admirers while remaining entirely below the radar of the public at large." In 2010, German music magazine Musikexpress placed them at number 23 in their list of the most underrated bands of all time.

== Discography ==
Studio albums

- Is That a Fish on Your Shoulder or Are You Just Pleased to See Me? (1987)
- Little Flecks of Foam Around Barking (1988)
- Picasso's Problem/Live at London Palladium (1990 mini-album)
- Odessey and Oracle (1992)
- The Baby's Head (as Chrys&themums) (1997)
- Decoy for a Dognapper! (2022)

Live albums

- The Chrysanthemums Go Germany: Insekt Insekt (1995 live CD album)
- The Chrysanthemums Go Germany: Two Thirty-Gallon Drums of Banana Puree (1995 live vinyl album)

Singles

- "Mouth Pain" (1987)
- "The **** Sessions" (1988)
- "Porcupine Quills" (1991)
- "A Thousand Tiny Pieces" (as Chrys&themums) (1997)

The two "The Chrysanthemums Go Germany" albums bore the same catalogue number (JAR 007) and are sometimes considered the CD and vinyl editions of the same album, however their content is different: besides having a different (though overlapping) selection of songs, the CD is a recording of a single show at the Circus Gammelsdorf, while the vinyl LP is compiled from several performances at various venues.
