= The Scott and Gary Show =

Television series

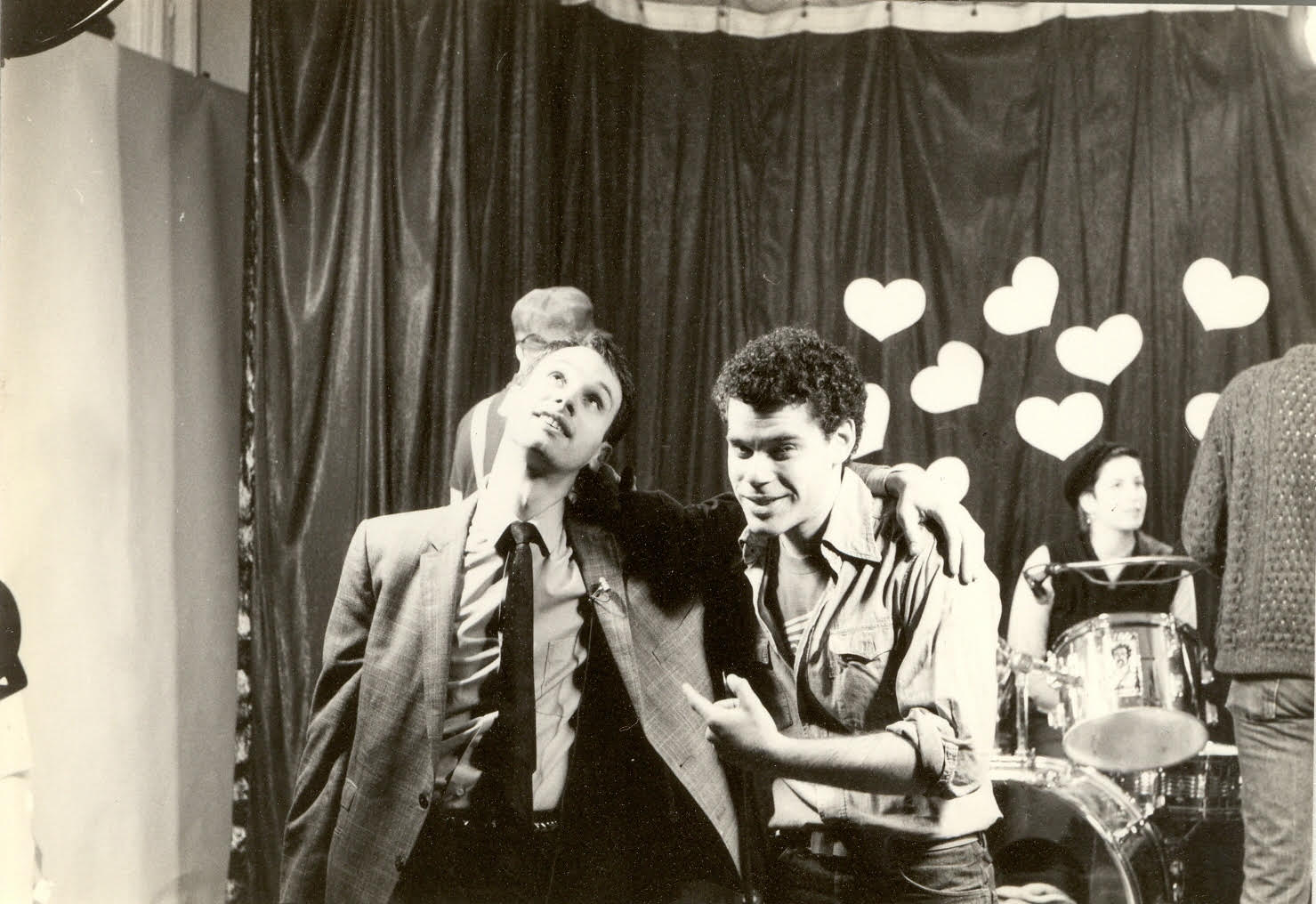
Scott Lewis and Gary Winter on the set of The Scott and Gary Show

The Scott and Gary Show! was a New York City-based public-access cable TV variety show that aired from 1983 to 1989. Paying a 1980s homage to 1960s TV dance parties, the show was a mix of alternative, punk, roots, and indie bands performing live along with a live audience and comedy skits. The show was co-produced and hosted by Scott Lewis and directed by Gary Winter who also self-syndicated the show across the country. The show was filmed in New York City from 1983 to 1986 and, at the invitation of filmmaker Jeff Krulik, in the Washington, D.C., metro area, from 1986 to 1989.

Among a notable lineup of musical guests were the Butthole Surfers, Beastie Boys, Ben Vaughn, The Raunch Hands, Half Japanese, Shockabilly, R. Stevie Moore, Velvet Monkeys .

As of July 2017, all The Scott and Gary Show! episodes became available to stream on Nightflight Plus. The show has been included in the Museum of The Moving Image exhibition TV Party: A Panorama of Public Access Television in New York City in 2011 and in the 2021 Museum of the City of New York exhibition New York, New Music 1980-1986 and is part of New York University's Fales Library Special Collections. In 2024 Scott and Gary created a YouTube channel.

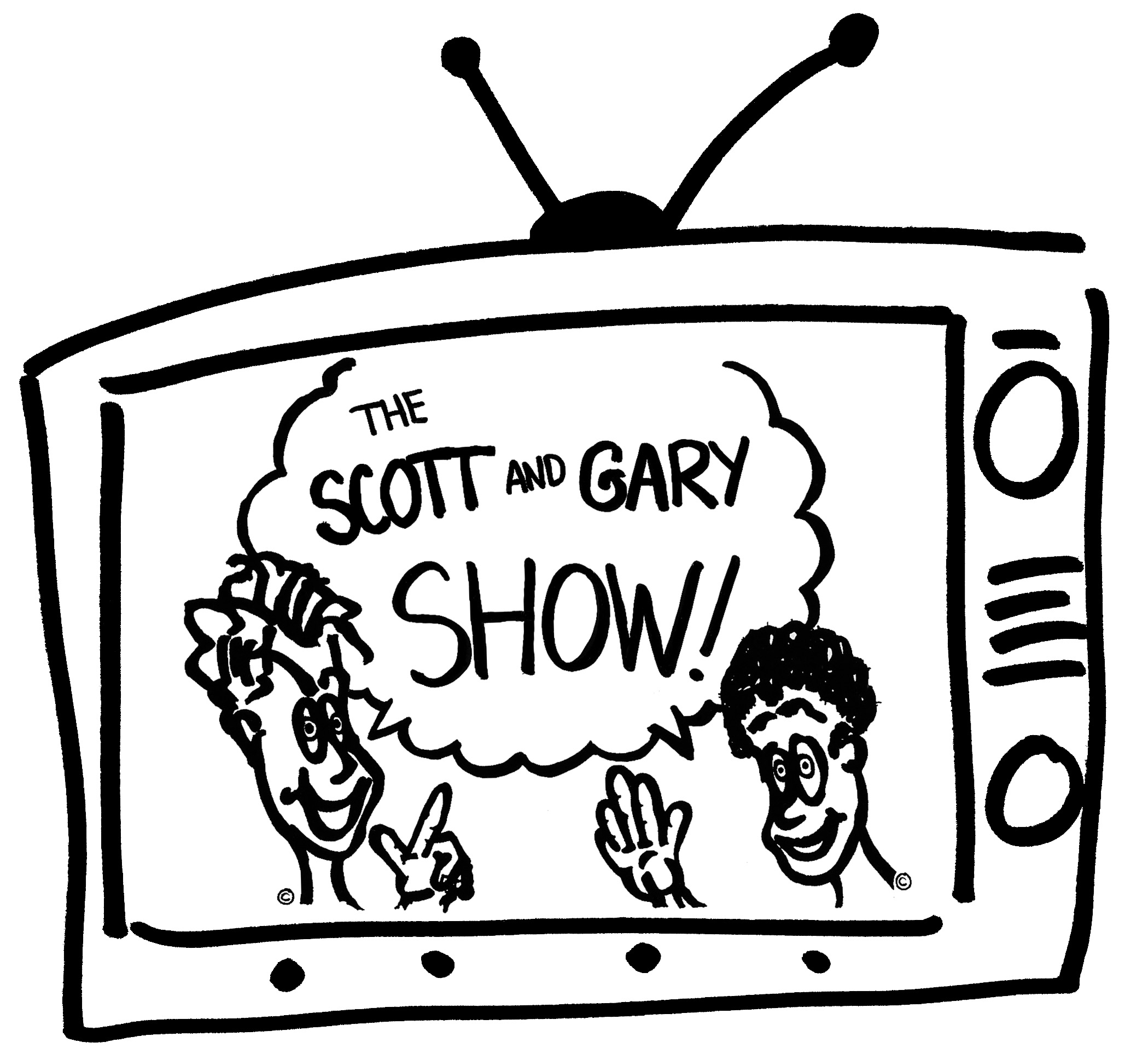
