= The Future Is Worse Than The Past =

Compilation album by R. Stevie Moore
- Released: July 4, 1999
- Recorded: 1978–1996
- Genre: Indie rock, lo-fi, power pop, art rock
- Length: 1:02:28
- Label: Megaphon/Pink Lemon
- Producer: Irwin Chusid

R. Stevie Moore chronology
Comeback Special (1998)	The Future Is Worse Than The Past (1999)	I'll Say It's My Fault (1999)

The Future Is Worse Than The Past is a compilation album by DIY home recording pioneer R. Stevie Moore. It was released on July 4, 1999. It was the first of four R. Stevie Moore albums released by the German record label Pink Lemon.

== Critical reception ==
Professional ratings
Review scores
Source	Rating
Allmusic	4/5 stars

When the album was released, Billboard wrote, "... Moore steps into the fore with yet another collection of lo-fi symphonies... Unsung by all save a small cult, Moore deserves a wider audience. Perhaps this fine release will help him find it."

== Track listing ==
All the songs were written by R. Stevie Moore, except where noted.

1. "Found a Job" (David Byrne) – 4:47
2. "Misplacement" – 3:27
3. "Everyone, But Everyone" – 6:59
4. "Where We Are Right Now" – 3:13
5. "Academy Fight Song" (Clint Conley) – 3:08
6. "Oh Baby Baby Baby" – 2:56
7. "Rose Garden" (Joe South) – 2:56
8. "Bladder" – 7:03
9. "Play Myself Some Music" – 3:43
10. "Idiot Opium" – 5:50
11. "Column 88" – 3:35
12. "Fletcher Honorama" (Ron Mael) – 3:00
13. "Once and For All" – 3:05
14. "Backbone Break" – 0:50
15. "Baby Scratch My Back" (Slim Harpo) – 3:04
16. "For Vini" – 3:14
17. "Disaster in the USA" – 2:14
