= Personal Appeal =

Compilation album by R. Stevie Moore
- Released: August 20, 2013
- Genre: Rock
- Label: Care in the Community

Professional ratings
Aggregate scores
Source	Rating
Metacritic	80/100
Review scores
Source	Rating
NME	8/10

Personal Appeal is a compilation album by American musician R. Stevie Moore. It was released on CD and LP in August 2013 on the UK label Care in the Community.

== Track listing ==
No.	Title	Length
1.	"Why Can't I Write a Hit?"
2.	"Makeup Shakeup"
3.	"Old"
4.	"Structure of Love"
5.	"The Picture"
6.	"Quarter Peep Show"
7.	"I've Begun to Fall in Love"
8.	"Pretend for a Second That You Are Very Intelligent"
9.	"Forecast"
10.	"No Body"
11.	"Man Without a Purpose"
12.	"Treat Me"
13.	"What We Did"
14.	"Copy Me"
15.	"I’m Sorry But Goodnight"
