= Po! =

UK musical group

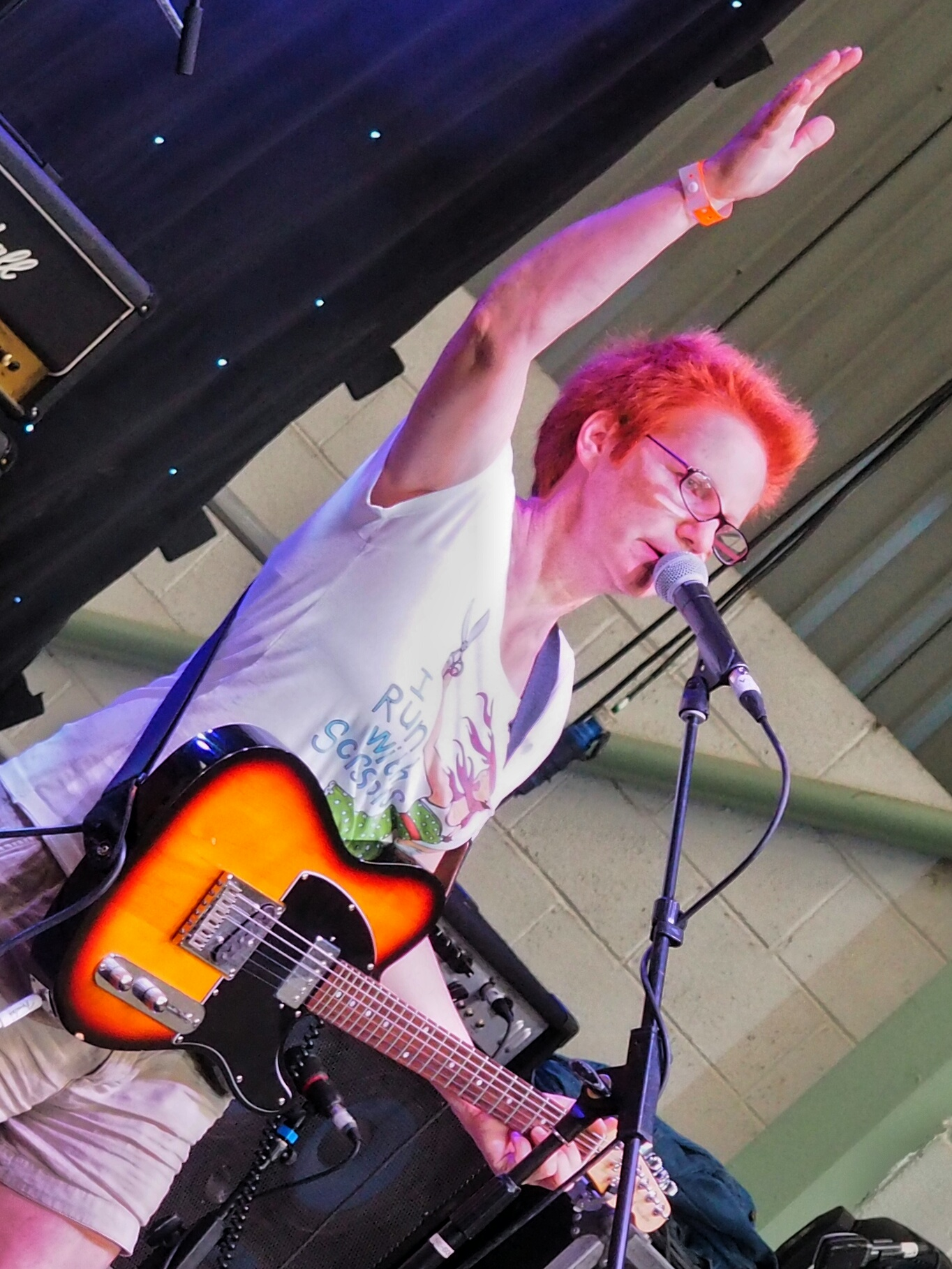
PO! at Indietracks 2016

Po! are an indie rock band formed in Leicester, England in 1987, with releases dating up to 1998 on Rutland Records, Sunday Records in the US and Elefant Records in Spain.

== History ==
Po! was originally formed by Ruth Miller (vocals and guitar), with Julian Glover (bass) and Mark Fuccio (drums). Usually subsumed under the C86 or twee pop headings – which is not essentially to misrepresent them – they possessed considerable originality. In particular, the themes of misogyny, disappointment, and nostalgia act as a counterpoint to the vocals, melodies, and jangly guitars so characteristic of the genre.

Part of the fanzine scene, Po!'s first release was the flexidisc Hopscotch in the Snow, which a Leicestershire fanzine Samantha produced from locally recorded demos in 1987. Jan Frazer replaced Fuccio on drums for this recording. This was picked up by BBC Radio 1 DJ John Peel, and provoked some interest. In 1988 Po! released another flexidisc, this time shared with The Originals, who played the backing instruments on 'Glass King'. There followed an album, released on the band's own Rutland Records label, entitled Little Stones, 1000 copies of which were pressed. It cost just £20 to record. The backing tracks were recorded on a Tascam reel-to-reel four-track at MikTon Studios (a former factory at 45 Chatham Street, Leicester; now private flats).The backing musicians for Little Stones were members of The Originals; Yvonne Blair (drums & percussion); Kevin Young (Guitar); Terri Lowe (Guitars, Bass Guitar). Equipment was supplied by Lowe and borrowed from Phil Hudson, the sound engineer at The Princess Charlotte, the premier music venue in Leicester. Bob Dylan, an influence, was represented in the form of a cover version of "All I Really Wanna Do", which featured a black 12-string Rickenbacker guitar.

Ruth continued to play, bringing in Mary Mills (Bass Guitar) and Jan Frazer returned on Drums. Frazer left and Lowe was added on Guitar, with Craig Williamson on Drums. This line-up recorded a 7-inch single for Sunday Records; Sunday Never Comes Around / Fay. This line-up lasted for a year before Miller and Lowe spent two years playing with Ruth's Refrigerator. Miller then reconstituted Po!, again with Lowe on guitar, Paul Knight (drums), and Gary Gilchrist (bass), in which configuration they produced the album Ducks and Drakes, and several EPs. Most of these releases were recorded at White House Studio in Syston, near Leicester, and produced by Mike Miller (no relation). During this period Po! recorded sessions for BBC West Midlands (6 songs, 5 of which were broadcast) and Radio Leicester (6 songs performed in an unplugged session).

In 1994, the band recorded a Peel session. This was broadcast in April and repeated in June. Two years later there followed Not Marked on the Ordnance Map, by which time Gilchrist had been asked to leave and Lowe taken on bass and guitar duties. Penny Holmes contributed backing vocals and oboe on parts of this album. Lowe added backing vocals on 'Summer Got Angry'. For live work Steve Cooke (formerly of The Swinging Laurels) played bass; he left before work began in 1997 on The Alphabet EP which was released in September and which the NME journalist Steven Wells made 'Single of the Week'. The last album was 'Horse Blanket Weather', released to coincide with a short tour in summer 1998. This album was recorded by Angus Wallace at Far Heath Studio in Northamptonshire. Further isolated tracks appeared on compilations.

Between 2004 and 2006 Lowe compiled a 33 track double CD of all the existing material which had not been issued in a digital format. This included the various BBC sessions, rare acoustic tracks, early demo tracks, out-takes from the Northern Wonder/No Flowers session which featured a string quartet, two tracks recorded live at Norwich Arts Centre in 1994 and various other extremely rare recordings. This compilation, called 'Rain and Ruin' was never released. Private copies of the tracks have been given to the Leicester and Leicestershire Museums and Record Office.

Miller, who played the character of Bridget in the comedy soap opera "Chez Lester", broadcast on the Cable 7 community TV channel, was married and had two children with Lowe, but later divorced. Miller subsequently worked as a deputy headmistress and in 2021 launched the Leicester-based Unglamorous project to mentor women through the process of starting their own bands, also fronting a punk rock group The Verinos for a time before her death in 2023.

== Discography ==
=== Albums ===
- Little Stones (1989, LP)
- Bedroom Tapes Vol.1 (1989, cassette)
- Bedroom Tapes Vol.2 (1990, cassette)
- Bedroom Tapes Vol.3 (19??, cassette)
- Fragile Debris (compilation) (19??, cassette)
- Live in Leicester (1992, cassette)
- Ducks And Drakes (1993, cd/lp)
- Not Marked on the Ordnance Map (1996, cd/lp)
- Bedroom Tapes Vol.4 (19??, cassette)
- Past Perfect Tense (compilation) (1997, cd)
- Horse Blanket Weather (1998, cd)

=== Singles ===
- "Hop-scotch in the Snow EP" (flexi-disc) (1988)
- "Glass King" / "Japan" by The Originals (flexi-disc) (1989)
- "Fay" (US release on Sunday Records) (1991)
- "Fay" (1992)
- "Tina" (Split flexi-disc cw Balloon Farm, Applicants and St. Christopher) (1992)
- "Northern Wonder" (1994)

=== EPs ===
- Grains of Sand (1991)
- Treasure (1992)
- Ghost of The Green Grass (1992)
- A Page A Day (1996)
- The Alphabet (1997)
