= Everything (R. Stevie Moore album) =

Compilation album by R. Stevie Moore
- Released: March 1984
- Recorded: 1959–1982
- Length: 1:55:00
- Label: New Rose Rose 31
- Producer: R. Stevie Moore

R. Stevie Moore chronology
Delicate Tension (1978)	Everything (1984)	What's the Point?!! (1984)

Professional ratings
Review scores
Source	Rating
AllMusic	4/5 stars

Everything You Always Wanted to Know About R. Stevie Moore But Were Afraid to Ask is the third official album by R. Stevie Moore, a double album compilation issued on vinyl in 1984 by New Rose Records of Paris, France. It was the first of four New Rose RSM albums to be released through the 1980s.

== Background ==
It contains Moore's songs and sound experiments from Nashville TN and Montclair NJ sessions, all primarily recorded on 1/4 track 7½ ips reel-to-reel stereo tape decks. The name of the album is a homage to the 1972 movie Everything You Always Wanted to Know About Sex* (*But Were Afraid to Ask). Its title in French is "TOUT CE QUE VOUS AVEZ TOUJOURS VOULU SAVOIR SUR R. STEVIE MOORE ET QUE VOUS N'AVEZ JAMAIS OSER DEMANDER".

Long out of print and later reissued on double compact disc by Cordelia Records, it was reconstructed from original song master tapes for improved fidelity by the artist in 2002. The original vinyl issue had suffered in audio quality from improperly mastered compilation tapes and also by the process of squeezing so much material on each side of the records.

The album was the first R. Stevie Moore release that Ariel Pink heard.

== Track listing ==
North and South Sides (CD1)

1. WORLD'S fair
2. I just WANT TO feel YOU
3. the HOLOCAUST parade
4. EATING paper, DRINKING ink
5. CHANTILLY lace (Richardson)
6. SHOW biz IS dead
7. the path OF JOY
8. PUTTIN' up THE groceries
9. ONE moore TIME
10. FORECAST
11. no TALKING
1. WELCOME TO london
2. I wanna hit YOU
3. bloody KNUCKLES (Moore/Griffin/Price)
4. JUMP out IN front OF a car
5. TOPIC of SAME
6. i hate PEOPLE
7. His Latest Flame (Pomus/Shuman)
8. RIGHT perfume WRONG mouthwash
9. for VINI
10. (some CD issues add Paris Diary audio filler)

East and West Sides (CD2)

1. FIRST-hand
2. teen ROUTINES
3. NEW strings
4. ONCE and for ALL
5. adult TREE (Moore/Anderson)
6. PASKETTI
7. misplacement
8. WHY can't i WRITE a HIT
9. PLAY
1. U.R. true
2. backbone BREAK
3. wayne WAYNE (go away)
4. DEBBIE
5. The meeting THAT COULDN'T be
6. MAMA weer ALL CRAZEE now (Holder/Lea)
7. i hope THAT YOU remember
8. (some CD issues add still more Paris Diary audio filler)
