= Kevin O'Brien (author) =

American novelist

- Born: Chicago, Illinois, U.S.
- Occupation: Novelist
- Writing career
- Genres: Thriller, suspense
- Notable work: Only Son
- Website: kevinobrienbooks.com

Kevin O'Brien is an American novelist of thriller and suspense novels. He grew up in Chicago's North Shore, attending Sacred Heart School and New Trier East High School in Winnetka, Illinois. He studied journalism at Marquette University in Milwaukee, Wisconsin and moved to Seattle, Washington in 1980. He worked as a railroad inspector for several years, while writing his first novel in various hotels.

His first novel, Only Son, was published in 1997 and was optioned for film rights by Tom Hanks. It was also selected by Reader's Digest for their Select Editions, along with novels by John Grisham, Nicholas Sparks, and Barbara Delinsky. His second novel, The Next to Die, was published in 2001 and became a USA Today bestseller. He has since written over twenty more novels, many of which have also been USA Today bestsellers. The Last Victim (2005) hit the New York Times Bestseller List and won the Spotted Owl Award for Best Pacific Northwest Mystery.

His latest novel, The Enemy at Home, was released on August 22, 2023. It is a historical thriller set in 1943 Seattle, where a woman joins America's "Army at Home" of defense plant workers and becomes connected to a serial killer they call the "Rosie Ripper".

He resides in Seattle today and is active in efforts in supporting up-and-coming authors, including Seattle 7 Writers and Hugo House.

== Bibliography ==
=== Standalone novels ===
- Only Son (1997)
- The Next to Die (2001)
- Make Them Cry (2002)
- Watch Them Die (2003)
- Left for Dead (2004)
- The Last Victim (2005)
- Killing Spree (2007)
- One Last Scream (2007)
- Final Breath (2009)
- Vicious (2010)
- Disturbed (2011)
- Terrified (2012)
- Unspeakable (2013)
- Tell Me You're Sorry (2014)
- No One Needs To Know (2015)
- You'll Miss Me When I'm Gone (2016)
- Hide Your Fear (2017)
- They Won't Be Hurt (2018)
- The Night She Disappeared (2021)
- The Enemy at Home (2023)

=== Family Secrets series ===
- The Betrayed Wife (2019)
- The Bad Sister (2020)

=== Anthologies ===
- Hotel Angeline: A Novel in 36 Voices (2011) (with others)
- Nothing Good Happens After Midnight: A Suspense Magazine Anthology (2020) (with others)
