= Has-Beens and Never-Weres =

Studio album by R. Stevie Moore
- Released: April 1990
- Recorded: 1976–89
- Genre: Psychedelic pop, punk rock
- Length: 57:00
- Label: Heliotrope (UK)
- Producer: R. Stevie Moore

R. Stevie Moore chronology
warning: r. stevie moore (1988)	Has-Beens and Never-Weres (1990)	Greatesttits (1990)

Has-Beens and Never-Weres is the tenth 12" vinyl record album by DIY home recording pioneer and one-man band R. Stevie Moore. Never officially reissued on compact disc.

== Track listing ==
=== Side one ===
1. "Intelligence" (3:45)
2. "Near Tonight" (4:15)
3. "Love Is the Way to My Heart" (2:42)
4. "Skin Mags" (6:48)
5. "Bonus Track" (LP Only) (1:15)
6. "You Came Along Just in Time" (3:00)
7. "I'm Out of My Mind" (7:20)

=== Side two ===
1. "Sit Down" (4:35)
2. "Banana Jerseyjam" (1:08)
3. "I Will Want to Die" (4:50)
4. "Martyrdom" (4:10)
5. "Pow Wow" (3:43)
6. "The Residents" (2:20)
7. "What's the Point?" (2:42)
8. "If You See Kay" (2:40)
9. "14 Months Back" (1:50)
