= R. Stevie Moore =

American musician who pioneered lo-fi/DIY music (born 1952)

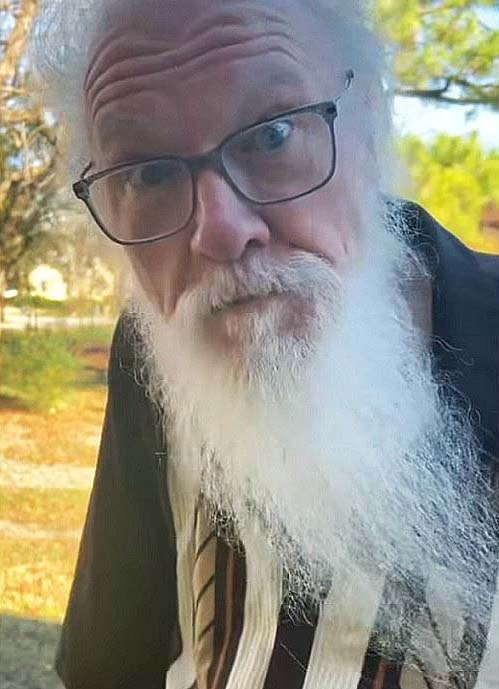
- Moore at his home in Madison, Tennessee, 2025

Background information
- Born: Robert Steven Moore; January 18, 1952 (age 74); Nashville, Tennessee, U.S.
- Origin: Madison, Tennessee, U.S.
- Genres: Lo-fi; power pop; post-punk; experimental; psychedelic pop
- Occupations: Musician; songwriter; radio DJ; session musician; record store clerk
- Instruments: Vocals; guitar; bass; keyboards; drums
- Years active: 1959–2019
- Formerly of: Ethos; The Marlborough
- Website: rsteviemoore.com

Robert Steven Moore (born January 18, 1952) is an American multi-instrumentalist, singer, and songwriter who pioneered lo-fi (or "DIY") music. Often called the "godfather of home recording", he is one of the most recognized artists of the cassette underground, and his influence is particularly felt in the bedroom and hypnagogic pop artists of the post-millennium. Since 1968, he has self-released approximately 400 albums, while about three dozen official albums (largely compilations) have been issued on various labels.

Born the son of Nashville A-Team bassist Bob Moore, Steven grew up in the 1960s listening to the Beatles, the Beach Boys, the Mothers of Invention, and Jimi Hendrix. In his teens, he acquired access to a reel-to-reel stereo tape deck and began recording as a one-man band in his parents' home. The innovative manipulation of low fidelity recording processes in his early albums defined his general aesthetic. With help from his uncle, he made his official label debut with 1976's compilation Phonography, which was well received in New York's punk and new wave circles. Although he is best known for "'60s-inspired power pop in the XTC vein," his body of work incorporates a variety of music genres, both popular and experimental, and his records are typically styled after freeform radio. He describes his prolific output as "a diary of sound".

From 1978 until 2010, Moore lived and recorded in his apartment studios in northern New Jersey. He was also a WFMU staff member for a number of years. In 1982, he launched the R. Stevie Moore Cassette Club, his home-based mailing service. Throughout the 1980s, the French label New Rose released a series of Moore vinyl albums: Everything (1984), Glad Music (1986), Teenage Spectacular (1987), and Warning (1988). After the 2000s, he became better known for his associations with Ariel Pink, who frequently praised Moore as his "mentor".

== 1952–1978: Madison/Nashville period ==
=== Early life and influences ===
Robert Steven Moore was born in Nashville, Tennessee on January 18, 1952. His father, Bob Moore (1932–2021), was a session musician associated with the Nashville A-Team conglomerate who worked as a recording bassist for Elvis Presley, Jerry Lee Lewis, Patsy Cline, Roy Orbison, George Jones, Chet Atkins, and Bob Dylan. Steven characterized his father as a "terrible" parent and said that "It was a very intense, dramatic, abusive childhood, with all this money coming in, because he's doing these amazing historical sessions. It's very, very sad. He was very disappointed in me because I was not a get-up-and-go type." At the age of seven, Steven made his commercial recording debut singing a duet with country recording artist Jim Reeves, "But You Love Me, Daddy". The novelty song was withheld from commercial release until 1969, when it became a hit single in the UK on the RCA Victor label. Moore's mother Betty Palmer was from Paterson, New Jersey.

I'm all about diversity. Freeform radio show. The Beatles White Album. ... I definitely had no "plan" to rush and become known as the very first modern DIY pioneer. "Self-contained innovator" — yes, but not satisfied to be content as merely that.

— R. Stevie Moore

As a teenager, Moore became proficient on guitar, bass, piano, and drums. He was self-taught. In 1966, he and a few high-school friends formed a short-lived rock combo called the Marlborough. His recordings in this period were heavily influenced by the Mothers of Invention's albums Freak Out! (1966) and We're Only in It for the Money (1967). He found particular inspiration from albums that are "just all over the map … Zappa leaned into parody, and I'm all about that. I love humor." On his 16th birthday, he received a four-track reel-to-reel tape deck and began recording as a one-man band set up in his parents' basement in suburban Madison. The first album he completed and self-released was a mixture of Beatles-inspired songs and sound collages titled On Graycroft (1968). Much of his output, he later said, was "uncontrollable—compelled without compulsion. I didn't seek out to do this. It just came out of me. I had this music inside of me and I wanted to be a pop star. It was like a disease that I had to record and write." Over the years he would describe himself as "a huge record collector and music historian" with interests ranging from beatnik and avant-garde to noise and jazz: "I love attempts at all genres and styles – even if I fail. It doesn't matter."

"You Can't Write a Song" from Stevie Moore Often (1975)
Excerpt from what AllMusic reviewer Stewart Mason calls one of "the first in a long series of quirky but immediately catchy, falsetto-sung songs that would quickly become one of Moore's trademarks."

Moore began working as a studio musician and assistant at his father's music publishing company, Mimosa Music. His father expected him to "follow in his footsteps, to become a wealthy country session picker. My personal interests couldn't have been more opposite than that." He briefly attended Vanderbilt University, but dropped out in 1971 to pursue his passions for writing, recording and performing music. That same year, he moved out of his parents' house and rented an apartment at the Music Row area in Nashville. He formed a close friendship with next-door neighbor Victor Lovera, who he called "one of my best friends and ... very influential for my songwriting." Victor Lovera died in 1998.

Throughout the early 1970s, Moore continued to play local shows with a group of high-school friends whose band name changed frequently. His music tastes—which mainly encompassed artists like the Beach Boys, the Move, Frank Zappa, and Todd Rundgren—were mostly out of step with the prevailing music culture in Nashville. In 1973, Moore, Lovera, and friends Roger Ferguson and Billy Anderson recorded original material at the local Audio Media recording studio under the band name "Ethos", which was left unreleased at the time. Engineer Paul Whitehead remembered of those sessions: "Moore [would] perform on ANY instrument with total control and an energy that I have never witnessed in a studio. I thought the world of Victor's unique vocal sound and thought the two of them would be wildly successful, but as I told them they would have to move to New York to even get noticed."

=== Phonography ===
In 1975, Moore was commissioned by his uncle Harry "H.P." Palmer (an executive of Atco Records) to record an album of Beatles instrumentals, Stevie Does the Beatles, but plans for an official release fell through. Palmer continued to encourage Moore to put his music out, and in 1976, Phonography was Moore's first album to be released on an outside label (Palmer's HP Music). Technically a compilation, the LP was assembled by Palmer using material from Moore's previous two years of home recording, with its contents split between pop songs and spoken-word interludes. Its initial pressing was limited to 100 copies.

Phonography was reviewed in New York's Trouser Press as "an outrageous collection of musical brain spewage" and "a true slash of genius". Moore credits the review's author, Ira Robbins, as "the one who helped turn people on to Phonography and those early independent records." The album soon attracted praise from within New York's punk and new wave circles. HP Music followed up with the EP Stance (recorded 1976–77) and the LP Delicate Tension (recorded 1976–78), both released 1978. Dominique Leone of Pitchfork wrote that Phonography and other albums from this time ultimately "defined his aesthetic: a mixture of Anglo-powered pop, Zappa-esque instrumentals, lo-fi experimental sound design, and other music that defies categorization." Phonography later became the best-known album of his career and was listed among "the fifty most significant indie records" in Rolling Stone's Alt-Rock-A-Rama (1996).

== 1978–2010: New Jersey period ==
In February 1978, Moore relocated to Montclair, New Jersey and got a job working at a Sam Goody record store in Livingston, where he remained for many years. According to him, although he lived 13 miles away from the Lincoln Tunnel in the proceeding decades, he rarely ever traveled into New York City. He said he arrived in New Jersey "right when punk was hitting, and I was an instant celebrity. I bleached my hair and I spiked it out, and I was Johnny Rotten from hillbilly land. It was so innocent then, total lo-fi." Over the decade, he made sporadic appearances on the television variety show The Uncle Floyd Show. He was also a staff member on the New Jersey–based independent radio station WFMU, where he hosted a weekly "Bedroom Radio" show for about "four or five years" and claimed to be "one of the first that did radio shows that would play Wagner, then The Sex Pistols, then hillbilly, then great funk."

Moore later reflected on this period: "I'm not a nightlife person. I should have really planted myself on the streets and plugged away, but I'm not a very good salesman so I never thought of going down and trying to convince people to sign me. It was a struggle. ... Through the 80s, my uncle was hoping I'd get a band together, but I had no idea how to do it." In late 1979, he used an eight-track Manhattan studio to record Clack! (1980), named for the studio's owner Tom Clack. It was Moore's first album recorded in a professional studio. At this point, he was heavily influenced by Public Image Ltd: "[they] changed my life! That whole postpunk thing, minimalist dub, drums and bass. It almost sounds like fragments, not finished songs. I loved that music." The album also marked the beginning of Moore's "post-punk era", which lasted until 1983's Crises. In the early 1980s, the tracks "Bloody Knuckles" and "Chantilly Lace" from Clack! saw some college radio airplay. WFMU's Irwin Chusid also performed with Moore as a drummer and compiled the What's The Point?!! (1984), the first record issued on the label Cuneiform.

"Colliding Circles" from Glad Music (1986)
One of Moore's best-known tracks from Glad Music, one of his more accessible albums. Its title was taken from a fake Beatles song.

In 1982, he launched the R. Stevie Moore Cassette Club, a mail-order service that issued his recordings on cassette. He acknowledged the number of albums he made available: "People tell me I'm shooting myself in the foot, releasing so much — I've heard that for years. But I can't help it. It's who I am." Music critic Richie Unterberger, in an essay about the developing cassette culture, wrote that he subsequently became "one of the most famous" artists associated with the movement. Between 1984 and 1988, the French label New Rose issued four of his albums on vinyl, starting with Everything You Always Wanted to Know About R. Stevie Moore (But Were Afraid to Ask). The album, a double-disc retrospective, proved briefly popular in France, with a single "Chantilly Lace" from the album becoming a minor sleeper hit there, and prompting Moore to undertake a promotional visit to the country. The remaining albums—Glad Music (1986), Teenage Spectacular (1987), and Warning (1988)—were mostly recorded using professional studios.

Moore continued to produce music and play gigs throughout the 1990s and 2000s. By 1999, the cassette club had become the R. Stevie Moore CD-R Club (CDRSMCLUB), and in 2005, he reported that there were about 100 dedicated fans who bought his music on a monthly basis; "They love getting product directly from the artist. Around 70 percent are in the States and about 30 percent in [Europe] ... Sometimes they'll disappear, and then come back five years later." In 2002, he recorded an album with Half Japanese frontman Jad Fair, titled FairMoore, described as "a lovely, heartfelt effort that shows both in top form" by critic Dave Mandl, who wrote that it "brings together two fiercely original figures in the American music underground", the album consisting of Fair reciting his poetry over Moore's instrumental backing. The 2009 compilation Me Too, issued on Cherry Red Records, was annotated by Dave Gregory of XTC.

== 2010s: Touring, Make It Be, and semi-retirement ==
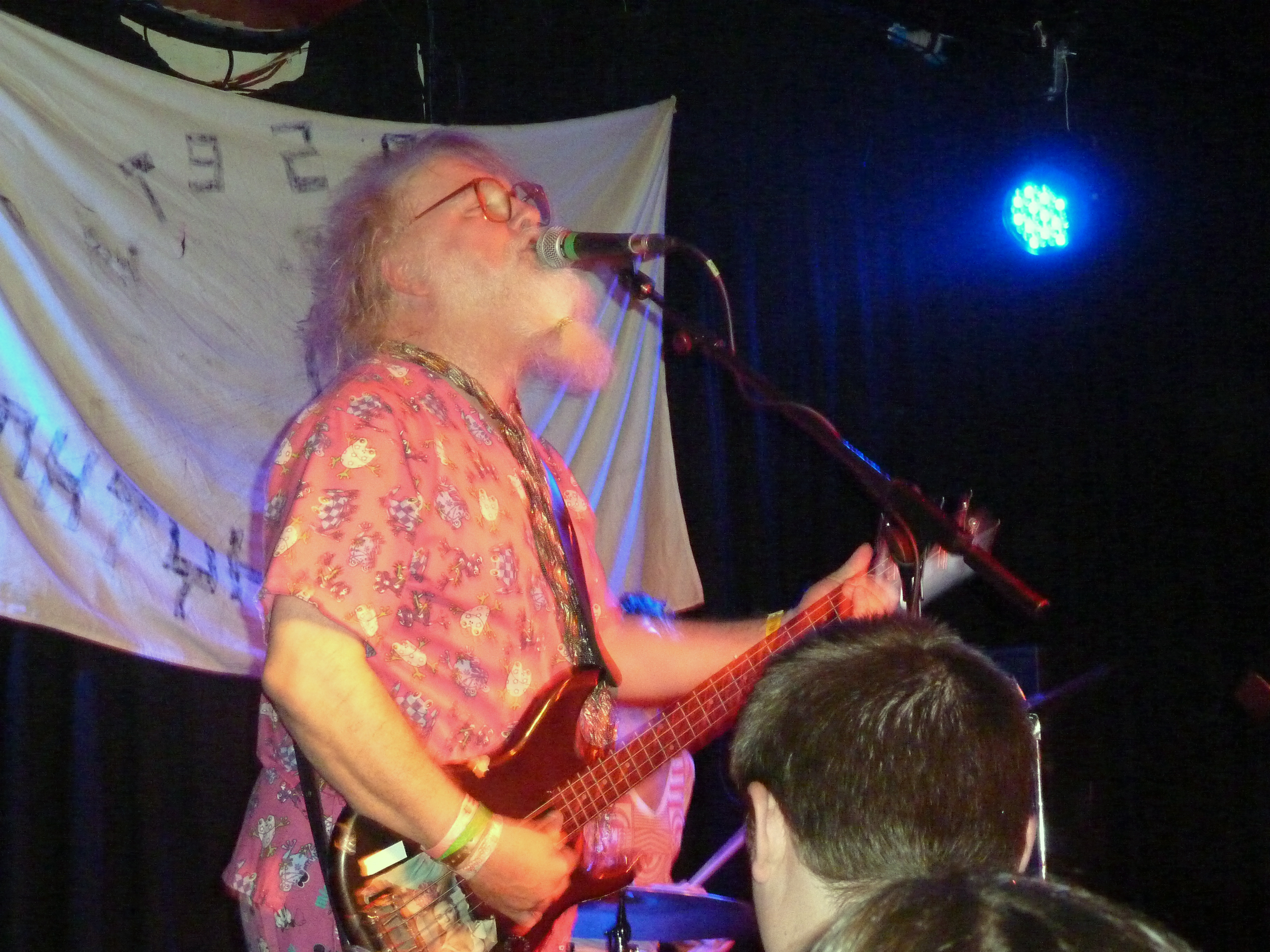
Moore performing in London, 2011

Moore relocated back to his native Nashville in December 2010. In 2011, he established a new band with guitarist J.R. Thomason and embarked on his first ever tours, including Europe. He said: "Things are just exploding left and right and I can't keep up with it all. I need management. It's a great problem to have, but I can't take advantage of it. I'm just one person. It's crazy." The world tour was made possible by a crowd-funded Kickstarter campaign and lasted for the next two years.

In November 2012, Moore traveled to Los Angeles and recorded material with Jason Falkner, formerly of Jellyfish. Their collaboration produced the 2015 album Make It Be. In 2017, the album was given an official release through Bar/None Records and was met with generally favorable reviews. That April, Moore and Falkner appeared together for a one-off performance at the South by Southwest music festival. Moore reflected that he had to stop his worldwide touring due to "health issues that are worsening," adding that his career "started takin' off ... way too late in life" and that he had recently "given up making proper rock and pop, rock and roll music. I just kinda maintain my back catalog, I don't record much anymore."

In 2019, Bar/None released Afterlife, a compilation of Moore tracks that were recorded at professional studios between 2006 and 2013. The album also features contributions from Ariel Pink, Jason Falkner, and Lane Steinberg. Most of the selections are remakes of decades-plus old songs. Moore said that the "final album playlist was purposefully kept safe, clean and more hi-fi mainstreamy, without my usual quirky left turns and lo-fi inserts."

On December 31, 2019, he issued a statement on his website purporting that he would offer "absolutely no further song writing, recording, performing, travelling, [or] interviews."

Moore made his first live public appearance since 2019 at Ariel Pink’s performance at the Coliseum in Nashville on 26 November 2025, where he delivered two spoken-word sets and joined the encore on harmonica.

== Impact and recognition ==
Moore might not have been the first rock musician to go entirely solo, recording every part from drums to guitar ... However, he was the first to explicitly aestheticize the home recording process itself. ... making him the great-grandfather of lo-fi.

— Matthew Ingram, The Wire

AllMusic's Stewart Mason summarized Moore's body of work as a "one of a kind" mixture of "classic pop influences, arty experimentalism, idiosyncratic lyrics, wild stylistic left turns, and homemade rough edges." However, "entire generations of lo-fi enthusiasts and indie trailblazers, from Guided by Voices to the Apples in Stereo, owe much to [his] pioneering in the field." In the liner notes of Me Too, XTC member Dave Gregory stated that Moore was "a seriously underrated maverick talent, the Neil Young of the real underground ... his lyrics are intelligent and/or downright funny, he knows how to string a sequence of chords together and he has a gift for melody that many a more 'successful' songwriter would envy." He worked with Moore on a remake of Moore's "Dates" in 1999. XTC founder Andy Partridge echoed of Moore's work: "What beauty, what invention."

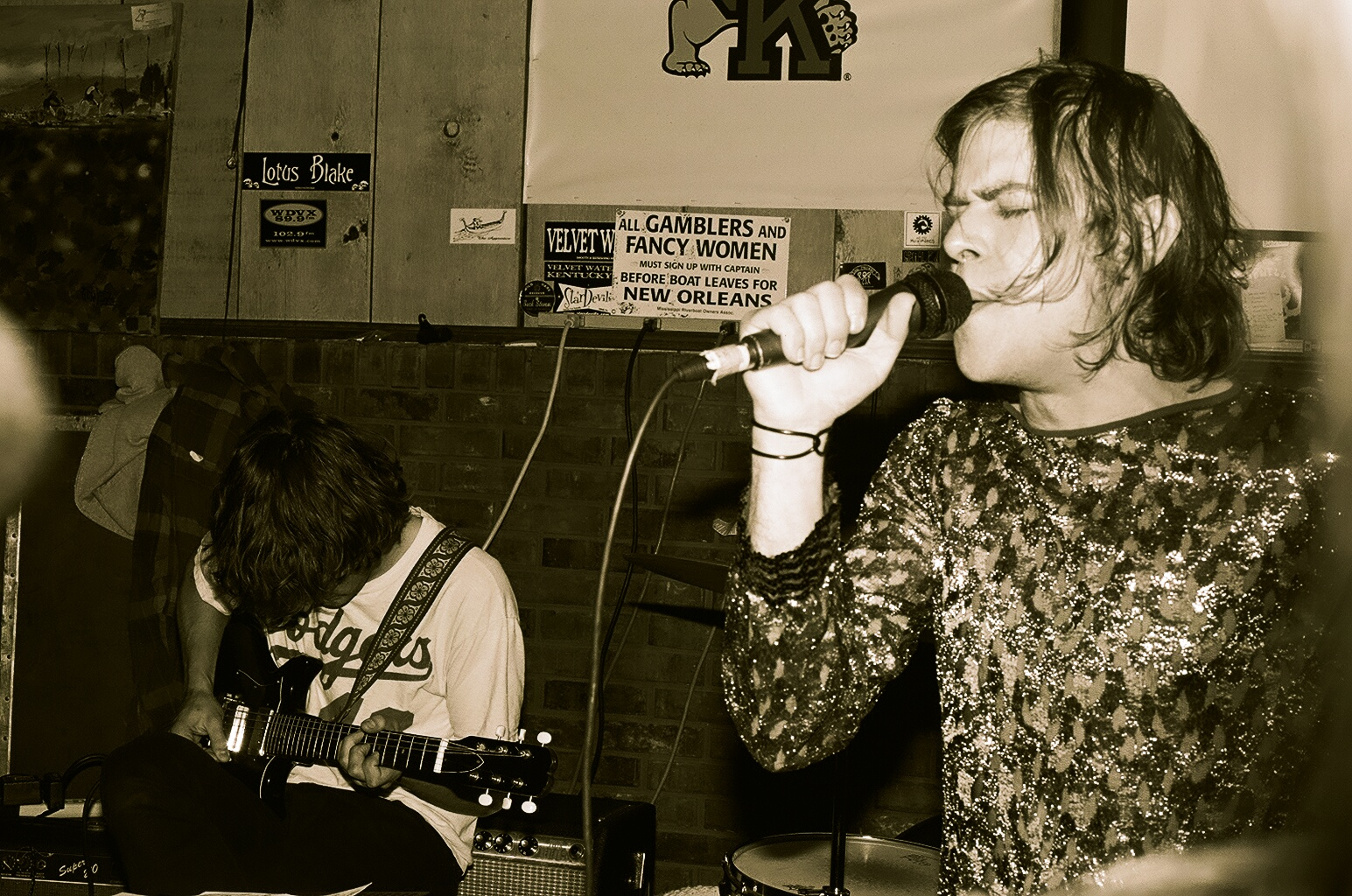
Ariel Pink performing in 2009

A wider recognition of Moore's music came in the late 2000s as a result of newer acts who cited him as an influence. In particular, there was Ariel Pink, who initiated a correspondence with Moore earlier in the decade and recorded some collaborations. Pink's own work shared much of the same musical approaches, although Moore denies that they sound similar. Moore's exposure grew alongside Pink's solo success as he was repeatedly championed by Pink in various press interviews. In 2005, Pink contributed a song to Moore's Conscientious Objector compilation. He told a journalist around this era that he was "trying to like, reverse time. I'm trying to get Todd Hyman to reissue him on Acute. Then it can get like, the David-Fricke-fuckin'-Rolling Stone treatment. It's about time. It's criminal that he's not well known. Especially in light of the fact that I'm getting attention. ... Mojo has never even printed a word about him. Uncut, never a word." In 2006, Pink curated the Moore retrospective Ariel Pink's Picks Vol. 1, and in 2012, the duo released the collaborative album Ku Klux Glam.

When a 2006 New York Times article referenced Moore as the progenitor of "bedroom pop", he responded that the notion was "hilarious to me. I guess because of my age, because of my bitter struggle to make a living and get some notoriety, I scoff at it. ... A lot of the music coming out of these bedrooms is not even interesting, not worthy of being heard. But some of it will be." Moore also hesitated to be associated with the "outsider music" tag, explaining that while he "loves" artists like Wesley Willis and Daniel Johnston, "they have no concept as to how to write or arrange a Brian Wilson song." In 2012, The Wire's Matthew Ingram argued that "[h]is echoes can be heard in the music of artists like Pavement, Smog, Guided By Voices and Beck, and through his disciple Ariel Pink, he has unwittingly provided the template for the entire movement currently known as Hypnagogic Pop." Tim Burrows of Dazed Digital similarly noted that "with a little help from James Ferraro and a few others, Moore and Pink can be credited with influencing [the] whole [genre of] hypnagogic pop."

== Discography ==
Due to his prolific output, the majority of Moore's CD and vinyl releases have been career-spanning compilations. He noted having "sort of ... two discographies: my own that contains all of my self-released material and the official releases, which are what record labels decided to put out over the years." During a 1984 appearance on The Scott and Gary Show, he stated that he had 109 releases in total. In 2012, his Bandcamp page listed over 200 releases. In a 2021 interview with a Los Angeles radio program, Jason Falkner said Moore has completed more than 300 records, though "not all in physical form."

Although it is often reported that his complete discography exceeds 400 albums, Moore said that the estimate was not an "actual proven number" and that "400 might seem stretching it a bit, [but] when it comes down to every bit of home taping I've ever done, including producing friends, alternate dub versions, session discs, audio verite ephemera, etcetera, it suddenly becomes an unlimited guess." In response to this Wikipedia article about Moore, which formerly stated that the count was "at least 200", he requested fans on his website to tally a more accurate estimate. In February 2018, he received a count of 354 releases listed on his "tapelist" page (including video and live recordings), 391 on his "albums list" page, and 344 on Bandcamp.

Official studio albums

- Delicate Tension (1978)
- Clack! (1980)
- Glad Music (1986)
- Teenage Spectacular (1987)
- Warning (1988)
- Objectivity (1997) (with Yukio Yung)
- FairMoore (2002) (with Jad Fair)
- The Yung & Moore Show (2006) (with Yukio Yung)
- Advanced (2011)
- Ku Klux Glam (2012) (with Ariel Pink)
- The Great American Songbook – Vol. 1 (2014) (with Jad Fair)
- Make It Be (2015) (with Jason Falkner)
- The Embodiment of Progressive Ideals (2018) (with Alan Jenkins and the Kettering Vampires)
- Fake News Trending (2019) (with Gary Wilson)

Selected compilations

- Phonography (1976)
- Everything You Always Wanted To Know About R. Stevie Moore But Were Afraid To Ask (1984)
- What's The Point?!! (1984)
- Verve (1985)
- R. Stevie Moore (1952-19??) (1987)
- Has-Beens and Never-Weres (1990)
- Greatesttits (1990)
- Contact Risk (1993)
- Revolve (1995)
- The Future Is Worse Than The Past (1999)
- Hundreds of Hiding Places (2002)
- Nevertheless Optimistic (2003)
- Meet the R. Stevie Moore (2008)
- Me Too (2009)
- Ariel Pink's Picks Vol. 1 (2011)
- Hearing Aid (2012)
- Lo Fi Hi Fives... A Kind Of Best Of (2012)
- Personal Appeal (2013)
- "Late Night Tales: Franz Ferdinand presents" (2014)
- Afterlife (2019)
- On Earth (2021)
- Freedom Vs. Fate (2021)
- "Cool Daddio": Original Film Soundtrack (2022)
