= Mick Bunnage =

British cartoonist (born 1958)

Mick Bunnage (born 21 December 1958) is a cartoonist, journalist, and comedy writer and was formerly the bass guitarist of The Deep Freeze Mice. He is the co-creator of the Modern Toss comic, which was also turned into a TV series by Channel 4. He has also worked as a writer on the BBC's 2004 The Stupid Version.

Bunnage was one of the three co-creators of Loaded magazine in 1994, alongside original editor James Brown and deputy editor Tim Southwell, and went on to become associate editor. Under the guise of Dr. Mick he continued to contribute to Loaded until 2004, where he created, with Jon Link, the Office Pest cartoon strip, which became a prototype for Modern Toss. The duo went on to contribute cartoons to a broad range of publications including The Guardian and the Daily Mirror. They then produced a website, shitflap.com, in 2003.
