= Greatesttits =

Studio album by R. Stevie Moore
- Released: May 1990
- Recorded: 1976–1987
- Genre: Psychedelic pop, punk rock
- Length: 75:31
- Label: Fan Club / New Rose (FR)
- Producer: R. Stevie Moore

R. Stevie Moore chronology
Has-Beens and Never-Weres (1990)	Greatesttits (1990)	Contact Risk (1993)

Professional ratings
Review scores
Source	Rating
AllMusic	4.5/5 stars

Greatesttits is the eleventh album released by DIY home recording pioneer and one-man band R. Stevie Moore. It was the first official compact disc issued by Moore. The album is a compilation of previously released tracks from Moore's four vinyl issues on New Rose Records, Paris.

The album is currently out of print.

== Track listing ==
1. "Welcome to London" (:56)
2. "I Wanna Hit You" (1:57)
3. "Chantilly Lace" (2:25)
4. "One Moore Time" (2:14)
5. "Forecast" (2:00)
6. "Topic of Same" (4:23)
7. "His Latest Flame" (2:13)
8. "First-Hand" (2:25)
9. "Teen Routines" (2:21)
10. "Why Can't I Write a Hit?" (2:20)
11. "U. R. True" (2:35)
12. "Wayne Wayne (Go Away)" (4:23)
13. "Debbie" (4:00)
14. "I Hope That You Remember" (3:02)
15. "Part of the Problem" (3:43)
16. "Don't Let Me Go to the Dogs" (4:04)
17. "Why Should I Love You" (3:18)
18. "Along Comes Mary" (2:52)
19. "The Bodycount" (3:33)
20. "Hobbies Galore" (4:14)
21. "Cover of "Rolling Stone"" (4:25)
22. "You Always Want What You Don't Have" (3:52)
23. "The Whereabouts" (3:32)
24. "Diary" (3:23)
