= (1952–19??) =

Studio album by R. Stevie Moore
- Released: May 1987
- Recorded: 1973–1986
- Genre: Psychedelic pop, punk rock
- Length: 55:00
- Label: Cordelia (UK)
- Producer: RSM

R. Stevie Moore chronology
Glad Music (1986)	(1952–19??) (1987)	Teenage Spectacular (1987)

Professional ratings
Review scores
Source	Rating
AllMusic	2/5 stars

(1952–19??) is the seventh 12" vinyl record album by DIY home recording pioneer and one-man band R. Stevie Moore. It was released on Alan Jenkins' Cordelia Records label in the UK.

"You and Me" was included on Moore's 2012 best-of, Lo Fi High Fives.

== Track listing ==
All tracks by R. Stevie Moore

Side Juan

1. "Signal" – 2:50
2. "Studio Animal" – :34
3. "Jesus Rocks" – 2:56
4. "Records" – 1:25
5. "The Flavour Is Mine" – 4:33
6. "Sox" – 1:08
7. "Back in Time" – 4:39
8. "Without Cause" – 1:14
9. "Treat Me" – 2:43
10. "Satisfaction" – 2:59
11. "Technical Difficulty" – 2:43

Side Tiu

1. "Genus Lupus" – 0:53
2. "Who Needs Girls?" – 4:49
3. "Delicate Tension" – 3:43
4. "You and Me" – 2:16
5. "Jesus Christ" – 1:20
6. "Rock 'N' Roll Kit" – 2:26
7. "Cassettes" – 1:32
8. "Oven Love" – 3:45
9. "You'll Never Get Me" – 1:18
10. "Goodbye Piano" – 2:22

== Personnel ==
- R. Stevie Moore – guitar, vocals
