= What's the Point?!! =

Compilation album by R. Stevie Moore
- Released: June 1984
- Recorded: 1976–1983
- Genre: Psychedelic pop, punk rock, lo-fi
- Length: 55:00(LP) 74:00 (CDR)
- Label: Cuneiform
- Producer: RSM
- Compiler: Irwin Chusid

R. Stevie Moore chronology
Everything (1984)	What's the Point?!! (1984)	Verve (1985)

Professional ratings
Review scores
Source	Rating
AllMusic	4.5/5 stars

What's the Point?!! is the fourth studio album by DIY home recording pioneer and one-man band R. Stevie Moore. It was the first album released by Steve Feigenbaum's Cuneiform Records label in Silver Spring MD. The vinyl record was pressed in the Netherlands. Officially reissued in 2017 on compact disc by Cordelia Records, the expanded & remastered CD-R version was originally available by mail from the artist.

== Track listing ==
=== Side one ===
1. GET THE JOB DONE (4:40)
2. LOVE HAS DOUBT (3:15)
3. THEME FROM HURRICANE DAVID (4:18)
4. PART OF THE PROBLEM (3:49)
5. COMPATIBILITY LEAVES (3:36)
6. GOING DOWN THE WAY (2:07)
7. FOR VINI (3:18)

=== Side two ===
1. PUTTIN' UP THE GROCERIES (3:01)
2. CONFLICT OF INTEREST (2:46)
3. I DON'T THINK SHE KNOWS (1:29)
4. BLOODY KNUCKLES (3:44)
5. WHERE YOU RESIDE (1:56)
6. I WANNA SLEEP (3:08)
7. WORLD'S FAIR (2:33)
8. TOO OLD (TO FALL IN LOVE) (3:07)

CDR Bonus Tracks:

1. COMMENTARY (1:01)
2. WHAT'S THE POINT (2:51)
3. PART OF THE PROBLEM (INST) (3:39)
4. I DON'T THINK SHE KNOWS (VCL) (1:00)
5. WICZ RADIO 1 (5:36)
6. BLOODY KNUCKLES (INST) (4:21)
7. WICZ RADIO 2 (6:22)
