= Stance (EP) =

STANCE e.p.

EP by R. Stevie Moore
- Released: September 1978
- Recorded: 1976–1977
- Genre: Ambient, psychedelic pop, punk rock, lo-fi
- Length: 15:57
- Label: H.P. Music
- Producer: RSM

R. Stevie Moore chronology
Phonography (1976)	STANCE e.p. (1978)	Delicate Tension (1978)

Professional ratings
Review scores
Source	Rating
AllMusic	3/5 stars

Stance is a 12-inch 45 rpm EP (extended play) vinyl record by DIY home recording pioneer and one-man band R. Stevie Moore. The 3-track disc was issued by Moore's uncle Harry Palmer's H.P. Music of Verona, New Jersey, in September 1978. It contains Moore's songs and sound experiments from Nashville, Tennessee, sessions, all originally recorded on 1/4-track 7 1/2 ips reel-to-reel stereo tape decks.

The front cover drawing was done by the artist.

Stance was included in its entirety as bonus tracks on the compact disc reissue of RSM's second album Delicate Tension in July 2004 by Alan Jenkins' private label Cordelia Records in the UK.

== Track listing ==
1. "Ist or Mas" (8:09) 4/76
2. "Dance Man" (3:12) 6/77
3. "Manufacturers" (4:36) 7/77
