= Delicate Tension =

Studio album by R. Stevie Moore
- Released: November 1978
- Recorded: 1976–1978
- Genres: Punk rock, power pop, lo-fi
- Label: H.P. Music
- Producer: R. Stevie Moore

R. Stevie Moore chronology
Stance (1978)	Delicate Tension (1978)	Everything (Tout) (1984)

Professional ratings
Review scores
Source	Rating
AllMusic	4.5/5 stars
Pitchfork	7.7/10

Delicate Tension is the second official album by American musician R. Stevie Moore, issued in a small pressing by his uncle Harry Palmer's H.P. Music in November 1978. The album is the follow-up to the compilation Phonography (1976). It mainly contains Moore's new songs and sound experiments captured since his recent move north from Nashville to New Jersey, all recorded on 1/4 track 7½ ips reel-to-reel stereo tape decks. The album cover was designed by Moore himself.

"I Go Into Your Mind" was later remade and released on 2006's The Yung & Moore Show.

== Reissues ==
Delicate Tension was reissued on compact disc in July 2004 by Cordelia Records in the UK. It included 10 bonus tracks, including the complete Stance e.p. from September 1978, as well as rare photos and an extensive e-mail interview by Jenkins.

== Track listing ==
All tracks are written by R. Stevie Moore.

Side one
No.	Title	Original appearance	Length
1.	"Cool Daddio"		2:40
2.	"Delicate Tension"		3:55
3.	"Schoolgirl"		2:00
4.	"Don`t Blame The Niggers"		3:29
5.	"Zebra Standards 29"		4:31
6.	"You Are Too Far from Me"	Swing and a Miss (1977)	5:13

Side two
No.	Title	Original appearance	Length
1.	"Oh Pat"	Sheetrock (1978)	1:20
2.	"Apropos Joe"	Sheetrock (1978)	3:10
3.	"Funny Child"	Piano Lessons (1977)	2:04
4.	"Norway"	The North (1978)	2:40
5.	"This Wednesday"	Games and Groceries (1978)	1:33
6.	"I Go Into Your Mind"	Games and Groceries (1978)	2:10
7.	"Horizontal Hideway"	Games and Groceries (1978)	1:05
8.	"Don`t Let Me Go to the Dogs"	Swing and a Miss (1978)	5:13

2004 CD bonus tracks
No.	Title	Original appearance	Length
15.	"Ist Or Mas"	Instrumentality (1976)	8:09
16.	"Dance Man"	Swing and a Miss (1978)	3:12
17.	"Manufacturers"	Swing and a Miss (1978)	4:36
18.	"My Little Automobile Is Sad"	Delicate Tension/Moore Stuff (1978)	2:44
19.	"Caffeine Boy"	Delicate Tension/Moore Stuff (1978)	2:39
20.	"Let's"	Delicate Tension/Moore Stuff (1978)	2:11
21.	"Thinking"	Delicate Tension/Moore Stuff (1978)	5:45
22.	"New Strings"		2:40
23.	"Bulk of Knowledge"	Delicate Tension/Moore Stuff (1978)	1:59
24.	"Adjacent Species Like You"	Delicate Tension/Moore Stuff (1978)	3:13

Notes

- Previously released tracks according to Moore.

== Personnel ==
- R. Stevie Moore – guitar, bass guitar, keyboards, vocals
- Mark Cudnik – mailed drum tracks (1–5, 14)
- Irwin Chusid – drums (11)
