= Contact Risk =

Studio album by R. Stevie Moore
- Released: February 1993
- Recorded: 1969–1991
- Genre: Psychedelic pop, punk rock
- Length: 75:34
- Label: Fruit of the Tune
- Producer: R. Stevie Moore

R. Stevie Moore chronology
Greatesttits (1990)	Contact Risk (1993)	Revolve (1995)

Contact Risk is the twelfth album released by DIY home recording pioneer and one-man band R. Stevie Moore. The album is currently out of print. the CD-R version is available by mail from the artist.

== Track listing ==
1. "Your Dancing Ears" (5:40)
2. "Under the Light" (5:14)
3. "I Could Be Your Lover (a)" (1:00)
4. "Elation Damnation" (3:23)
5. "The Clinch" (2:30)
6. "Sponge Bath" (1:00)
7. "Can't Afford No Food" (2:01)
8. "Times Have Changed" (4:44)
9. "Ill (Worst)" (2:46)
10. "You Love Me, Do Something" (4:53)
11. "I Could Be Your Lover (b)" (:56)
12. "Pledge Your Money" (3:37)
13. "You Can't Write a Song" (4:16)
14. "Oil" (8:27)
15. "It's What You Do (It's Not What You Are)" (4:23)
16. "Alecia" (5:48)
17. "I Could Be Your Lover (c)" (1:06)
18. "I Like to Stay Home" (4:15)
19. "No Know" (3:00)
20. "Hours of Delight" (1:37)
21. "Play Myself Some Music" (3:44)
22. "Innocent Mind" (2:57)
