= Glad Music =

Studio album by R. Stevie Moore
- Released: February 1986
- Recorded: 1979; 1983–1985
- Genre: Psychedelic pop; new wave
- Length: 52:00
- Label: New Rose
- Producer: R. Stevie Moore

R. Stevie Moore chronology
Verve (1985)	Glad Music (1986)	(1952-19??) (1987)

Professional ratings
Review scores
Source	Rating
AllMusic	4.5/5 stars

Glad Music is the sixth vinyl record album by American multi-instrumentalist R. Stevie Moore (RSM). It was the second of four RSM albums released by New Rose Records in Paris. Glad Music differed from most Moore record albums by being almost exclusively recorded in a professional 8- and 16-track studio. The record sleeve's art design mimics the UK version of the Beatles' 1964 soundtrack album A Hard Day's Night. The title "Glad Music" was a nod to the music publishing company of the same name.

Earlier recordings of some of the songs had appeared on other albums, such as 1978's Delicate Tension. "Why Should I Love You?", was later covered by the English indie rock band the Vaccines and released as a single. "Along Comes Mary" was originally recorded by the Association in 1966. "Colliding Circles" gets its name from the title of a fake unreleased Beatles song invented by humorist Martin Lewis. (Moore also wrote and recorded "Pink Litmus Paper Shirt", the name of another of Lewis' faux Beatles tunes; the song is included as a bonus track on a 2017 CD reissue of Glad Music.)

== Track listing ==
Side one
No.	Title	Length
1.	"Norway"	3:01
2.	"I Like to Stay Home"	4:07
3.	"I Wouldn't Mind Dyin'"	2:31
4.	"He's Nuts"	4:14
5.	"Part of the Problem"	3:42
6.	"Don't Let Me Go to the Dogs"	4:09

Side two
No.	Title	Length
1.	"Why Should I Love You?"	3:23
2.	"I Love You So Much It Hurts"	3:13
3.	"Shaking' in the Sixties"	2:40
4.	"Along Comes Mary"	2:54
5.	"Colliding Circles"	3:49
6.	"Time Stands Still"	2:53
7.	"The Strange"

Note
- "Part of the Problem" and "I Love You So Much It Hurts" are the same recordings that originally appeared on Clack! (1980).

Expanded CD-R bonus tracks
No.	Title	Original release	Length
14.	"Your Dancing Ears"	R. Stevie Moore Is Worth It (1985)	3:34
15.	"Glib Contempt"		4:35

2017 Cordelia reissue bonus tracks
No.	Title	Original release	Length
13.	"The Strange" (extended)		7:40
14.	"Glib Contempt"		4:31
15.	"Your Dancing Ears"	R. Stevie Moore Is Worth It (1985)	3:36
16.	"Man Without a Gland"	Piano Lessons (1977)	4:35
17.	"Indian Giver"	R. Stevie Moore Is Worth It (1985)	3:15
18.	"Kaleidoscopics"	Kaffeeklatsch (1984)	4:48
19.	"Bigger than the Beatles"	1984U (1984)	2:02
20.	"I Like to Stay at Home" (live)		4:23
21.	"Pink Litmus Paper Shirt"	R. Stevie Moore Is Worth It (1985)	3:41
