= The Deep Freeze Mice =

English new wave band

The Deep Freeze Mice were an English new wave band active between 1979 and 1989. They were based in Leicester, England, and consisted of the core members Alan Jenkins (guitars and singing), Sherree Lawrence (combo organ and other keyboards) and Mick Bunnage (bass guitar). The band had two different drummers over the years, Graham Summers and Pete Gregory.

The band released ten albums on its own labels, from 1979 to 1983 on Mole Embalming Records and from 1983 to 1989 on Cordelia Records. Their music was odd, often consisting of absurd and surreal lyrics delivered in Jenkins' deadpan voice, accompanied by bouncy pop/progressive rock music. Favoured lyrical concerns included animal rights, conformity and science fiction.

The Deep Freeze Mice are included in the Nurse with Wound list.

== Jenkins outside The Deep Freeze Mice ==
Jenkins was also a member of The Chrysanthemums in the late 1980s, and joined up with members of Po! and The Ammonites in Ruth's Refrigerator, and subsequently Jody & The Creams (later "Alan Jenkins & The Creams"). He has played guitar with psychedelic, experimental surf instrumental band The Thurston Lava Tube since 2001, alongside Blodwyn P. Teabag - combo organ, Johnny Pacino - bass and Mat Bartram - drums. Marshall Cavendish replaced Johnny Pacino on bass in 2003.

== Discography ==
- My Geraniums are Bulletproof (1979)
- Teenage Head in My Refrigerator (1981)
- The Gates of Lunch (1982)
- Saw a Ranch House Burning Last Night (1983)
- I Love You Little Bo Bo with Your Delicate Golden Lions (double L.P.) (1984)
- "These Floors Are Smooth" (7" single) (1985)
- Hang on Constance, Let Me Hear the News (1985)
- Neuron Music (12" EP) (1986)
- War, Famine, Death, Pestilence and Miss Timberlake (1987)
- Rain Is When the Earth is Television (1987)
- The Tender Yellow Ponies of Insomnia (1988)
- The Best of The Deep Freeze Mice (2014)
