= Terry Burrows =

British musician and author

Terry Burrows / Yukio Yung
- Born: Terence Ashley Burrows; Ipswich, Suffolk, England
- Genres: Art pop; experimental; krautrock; drone; progressive rock; noise; neo-classical
- Occupations: Musician, Author, Broadcaster
- Instruments: Vocals, guitars, bass, keyboards, electronics, drums, reeds
- Years active: 1984–present

Terence Ashley Burrows is an English author, multi-instrumental musician, broadcaster and producer based in London. Best known as a cult performer under the alias Yukio Yung, Burrows is also an author of books relating to music history, theory, and tuition, technology, business, popular psychology and modern history. His works include The Art of Sound (Thames & Hudson), Mute: A Visual Document (co-authored with Daniel Miller) (Thames & Hudson), Guitars Illustrated (Billboard), 1001 Guitars... (Cassell), KISS Guide to Playing Guitar (Dorling Kindersley), Total Guitar Tutor (Barnes & Noble), and ITV Visual History of the 20th Century (Carlton). His books — now numbering close to one hundred titles — have been published in sixteen countries and translated into a dozen languages. As a writer, his pseudonyms include Terence Ashley, Harrison Franklin, Hans-Joachim Vollmer and Yukio Yung. He has also written for periodicals in the UK, US, and Germany.

Burrows was born in Ipswich, Suffolk, England and began studying classical piano at the age of five. (AllMusic describes him as "A classically trained keyboardist with an advanced degree in computer engineering.") Aged 12 he taught himself guitar, and later took up bass, synthesisers, drums, and saxophone. The anti-establishment attitudes of punk subculture appealed to him but his musical influences included Syd Barrett, Kraftwerk, the Who, Brian Eno, the Television Personalities, Talk Talk and the Canterbury progressive music scene. Still in his teens, Burrows founded indie label, Hamster Records, releasing albums by non-commercial acts such as Loch Ness Monster, Rimarimba, R. Stevie Moore and Attrition, and his own "post-punk industrial funk" under the guise of Jung Analysts. In 1986, Cordelia Records released Burrows' Tree Climbing Goats (And Other Analysing Shanties) LP, his first release under the pseudonym Yukio Yung, chosen because of an obsession at that time with Japanese culture.

In 1986, Burrows met Alan Jenkins, leader of The Deep Freeze Mice, and together they formed The Chrysanthemums, with Burrows as lead singer and keyboard player. A psychedelic art pop band with a cult following almost entirely outside of the UK, in 2010, German music magazine MusikExpress placed them at number 23 in their list of the most under-rated bands of all time.

Burrows also recorded a series of "abstract industrial" albums with "Krautrock" musician Asmus Tietchens, a former collaborator with Brian Eno and Cluster. The first volume, Watching The Burning Bride formed the soundtrack to the similarly named film, by Canadian director Mark Mushet. He also produced a number of albums of instrumental progressive rock electronica as part of the duo Push-Button Pleasure.

In the early 1990s, Burrows flirted with electronic dance music releasing a pair of 12-inch singles as YooKO on the Belgian ZZB label, one of which, "Matrix", reached the Top Ten in Germany's Network Dance Chart. Burrows later released further solo Yukio Yung material, commencing with 1993's LP Art Pop Stupidity and CD A Brainless Deconstruction of the Popular Song. Over the next four years he released a single and four EPs. In 1997, Burrows rejoined with his ex-Chrysanthemums bandmate Vladimir Zajkowiecz [Martin Howells] to form a new version of that group, renamed with the visual pun Chrys&themums to distinguish it from the original line-up.

In 2004, Burrows resumed his collaboration with US home-recording pioneer R. Stevie Moore. The resulting album was released as Yung & Moore Versus The Whole Goddam Stinkin World. (The sleeve depicts the duo as cartoon superheroes about to demolish the planet – an intended visual metaphor for the antipathy the mainstream has shown both artists' music over the years.)

2006 saw Burrows returning to the musical abstraction of his earlier career with Tonesucker, a "fundamentalist" noise/drone project that has performed at festivals across Europe. Burrows has also performed on theremin and VCS3 at Britain's prestigious Aldeburgh Festival.

== Selected discography ==
- Jung Analysts:
  - A Leading Surgeon Speaks (LP, 1984)
  - The Wishing Balloons (LP, 1984/Cassette 2017)
  - Sprockendidootch (LP, 1985/Cassette 2017)
  - A Leading Surgeon Speaks + (Cassette, 2017)
- Push-Button Pleasure:
  - The Vast Difference (LP 1986/Cassette 2018)
  - The Last Dissonance (LP 1988/Cassette 2018)
- The Chrysanthemums:
  - Mouth Pain/Another Sacred Day (7-inch 1987)
  - Is That A Fish On Your Shoulder or are you just pleased to see me? (LP/CD 1987)
  - The **** Sessions (12-inch 1988)
  - Little Flecks Of Foam Around Barking (CD/2x LP 1988)
  - Picasso's Problem/Live at London Palladium (12-inch 1990)
  - Porcupine Quills (LP/CD 1991)
  - Odessey and Oracle (LP/CD 1992)
  - Chrysanthemums Go Germany/Insekt Insekt (LP/CD/Box 1995)
  - Decoy for a Dognapper (CD 2022)
- Chrys&themums:
  - The Baby's Head (CD 1998)
  - A Thousand Tiny Pieces (CD EP 1998)
- As Yukio Yung:
  - Tree Climbing Goats (and other analysing shanties) (LP 1987)
  - Valborgmassoafton (Cassette 1991)
  - Art Pop Stupidity 1993 (LP)
  - A Brainless Deconstruction Of The Popular Song (CD 1993)
  - Keep The Black Flag Flying/Yukio's Dream #6 (Reservoir Girls) (7-inch 1994)
  - (Mostly) Water (CD EP 1996)
  - Good-bye Pork Pie Brain (10-inch LP 1996)
  - Hello Pulsing Vein (10-inch LP 1997)
  - Good-bye Pork Pie Brain/Hello Pulsing Vein (2x10: LP Box 1997)
- Family Yung (with Louis Burrows):
  - The Lost World of Family Yung Part One (CD 2022)
  - The Lost World of Family Yung Part Two (CD 2022)
- Yung & Moore/The Yung & Moore Show (with R. Stevie Moore)
  - Objectivity (CD EP 1997)
  - Conscientious Objector (RSM CD 2004)
  - The Yung & Moore Show (CD 2006)
- Asmus Tietchens & Terry Burrows
  - Watching the Burning Bride (LP 1986)
  - Burning the Watching Bride (LP 1998)
  - Watching the Burning Bride/Burning The Watching Bride (CD 2017)
- Terry Burrows:
  - The Whispering Scale (LP 1989)
  - Live at Splitting the Atom (CD 2016)
- YooKO:
  - Matrix/Swirl (12-inch 1992)
  - Everybody Get it Together (12-inch 1992)
- Tonesucker:
  - Slaughterhouse (CD 2006)
  - Live In Canada (CD 2008)
  - Caput Mortuum (DVD 2010)
  - Live In London (DVD 2010)
  - Sator Arepo Tenet Opera Rotas (CD 2011)
  - Omnia Convivia Crastina (CD 2012)
  - Sub Rosa (CD 2013)
  - Initium (CD 2017)
  - Memento Mori (Cassette/USB Stick/CD 2018)
