= Phonography (album) =

Compilation album by R. Stevie Moore
- Released: April 26, 1976
- Recorded: 1973–1976
- Genre: Art rock; lo-fi
- Length: 44:07
- Label: Vital
- Producer: R. Stevie Moore
- Compiler: Harry Palmer

R. Stevie Moore chronology
Phonography (1976)	Stance (1978)

Phonography is the first official album by American multi-instrumentalist R. Stevie Moore, released in 1976 on the artist's private Vital Records "label". Its initial vinyl pressing was limited to 100 copies. The album mostly consists of selections from his self-released albums Stevie Moore Often (1975) and Stevie Moore Returns (1976), all recorded on 1/4 track 7½ ips reel-to-reel stereo tape decks. A 7-inch EP was issued in 1977 called Four from Phonography, which was the debut release by Moore's uncle Harry Palmer's H.P. Music label.

The album attracted a following among New York's punk and new wave circles. One contemporary review in New York's Trouser Press magazine called the album "an outrageous collection of musical brain spewage" and "a true slash of genius". Phonography ultimately became the best-known album of Moore's career. In 1996, the album was included in the Rolling Stone book Alt-Rock-A-Rama as being among "The Fifty Most Significant Indie Records". In 2011, The Wire's Matthew Ingram noted the album for anticipating "lo-fi, DIY, Hypnagogic Pop and more".

== Reissues ==
The album was reissued in a larger general pressing on H.P. Music in late 1978 with a different front cover image. In 1998, it was reissued on CD by Flamingo Records and included 8 non-LP bonus tracks, as well as many photos and an informative interview/essay by Dennis Diken. Another remaster was issued on CD in 2009 by Chris Cutler's Recommended Records without the bonus tracks, but with a new booklet of images and data. In 2010 a newer remaster was reissued on deluxe high-grade vinyl by Sundazed Records.

== Track listing ==
Track sources are provided by Moore.

Side one
No.	Title	Original album	Length
1.	"Melbourne"	Stevie Moore Returns (1976)	3:24
2.	"Explanation of Artist"		0:31
3.	"Goodbye Piano"	Stevie Moore Returns (1976)	2:37
4.	"Explanation of Listener"	Stevie Moore Often/Pica Elite (1975)	0:49
5.	"California Rhythm"	Stevie Moore Often/Pica Elite (1975)	3:42
6.	"I've Begun to Fall in Love"	Stevie Moore or Less (1975)	2:03
7.	"The Spot"		1:19
8.	"I Want You in My Life"	Stevie Moore Returns (1976)	2:25
9.	"I Wish I Could Sing"	Stevie Moore Returns (1976)	4:12
10.	"Theme from A.G."	Stevie Moore Often/Pica Elite (1975)	1:24

Side two
No.	Title	Original album	Length
1.	"The Voice"	Stevie Moore Returns (1976)	0:44
2.	"Showing Shadows"	Stevie Moore Often/Pica Elite (1975)	3:02
3.	"She Don't Know What to Do with Herself"	Stevie Moore Often/Pica Elite (1975)	3:17
4.	"The Lariat Wressed Posing Hour"		3:53
5.	"I Not Listening"	Next/Apologies to Mr. Gottlieb (1974)	3:13
6.	"Mr. Nashville"		1:34
7.	"Moons"	Next/Apologies to Mr. Gottlieb (1974)	5:57

1998 CD bonus tracks
No.	Title	Original album	Length
18.	"Welcome to London"	Stevie Moore or Less (1975)	0:57
19.	"You and Me"	Stevie Moore or Less (1975)	2:29
20.	"Wayne Wayne (Go Away)"	Stevie Moore Often/Pica Elite (1975)	4:46
21.	"Forecast"	Stevie Moore Often/Pica Elite (1975)	2:00
22.	"Why Should I Love You"	Stevie Moore Often/Pica Elite (1975)	3:53
23.	"Dates"	Stevie Moore Often/Pica Elite (1975)	5:09
24.	"Hobbies Galore"	Stevie Moore or Less (1975)	4:13
25.	"Because We're the Dig"	Stevie Moore or Less (1975)	5:17
