= Alt-J discography =

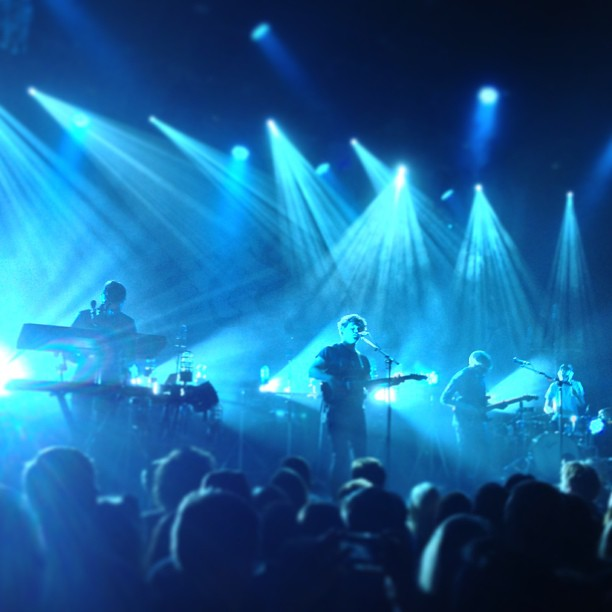
- Alt-J in 2013. Left to right: Gus Unger-Hamilton, Joe Newman, Gwil Sainsbury, Thom Green
- Studio albums: 4
- EPs: 6
- Live albums: 1
- Remix albums: 1
- Singles: 20
- Music videos: 19

British indie rock band called Alt-J have released four studio albums, one live album, one remix album, six extended plays, twenty singles, and nineteen music videos.

== Albums ==
=== Studio albums ===
List of studio albums, with selected chart positions and certifications
Title	Album details	Peak chart positions										Certifications
Title	Album details	UK	AUS	BEL (FL)	CAN	FRA	IRL	NLD	NZ	SWI	US	Certifications
An Awesome Wave	Released: 28 May 2012; Label: Infectious; Formats: CD, LP, digital download	13	9	17	30	45	11	18	24	39	80	BPI: Platinum; ARIA: Platinum; MC: Gold; NVPI: Platinum; RIAA: Platinum
This Is All Yours	Released: 22 September 2014; Label: Infectious; Formats: CD, LP, digital download	1	2	2	2	5	4	6	5	3	4	BPI: Gold; ARIA: Gold; MC: Gold; NVPI: Gold; RIAA: Gold
Relaxer	Released: 2 June 2017; Label: Infectious; Formats: CD, LP, digital download	6	4	4	7	11	9	12	12	3	14	BPI: Silver
The Dream	Released: 11 February 2022; Label: Infectious; Formats: CD, LP, digital download	3	6	3	50	27	6	8	16	7	110	
"—" denotes a recording that did not chart or was not released in that territory.

=== Live albums ===
List of live albums, with selected chart positions
Title	Album details	Peak chart positions				
Title	Album details	UK	BEL (FL)	BEL (WA)	FRA	NLD
Live at Red Rocks	Released: 24 June 2016; Label: Infectious; Formats: CD+DVD+Blu-ray, 2×LP+DVD, digital download	— (Note: "Live at Red Rocks" did not enter the UK Albums Chart, but peaked at number 39 on the UK Record Store Chart.)	58	67	187	163
"—" denotes a recording that did not chart or was not released in that territory.

=== Remix albums ===
Title	Album details	Peak chart positions									
Title	Album details	UK	UK Indie	UK R&B	BEL (FL)	BEL (WA)	FRA	NLD	SCO	US	US Rock
Reduxer	Released: 28 September 2018; Label: Infectious; Formats: CD, digital download	— (Note: "Reduxer" did not enter the UK Albums Chart, but peaked at number 54 on the UK Physical Albums Chart.)	17	7	76	125	133	120	99	38	4
"—" denotes a recording that did not chart or was not released in that territory.

== Extended plays ==
List of extended plays, with selected chart positions
Title	Details	Peak chart positions
Title	Details	US Dance
Films	Released: 2009; Formats: Digital download	—
∆	Released: 2011; Formats: Digital download	—
iTunes Session	Released: 16 April 2013; Label: Infectious; Formats: Digital download	—
Summer	Released: 25 November 2013; Label: Infectious; Formats: Digital download	13
Deadcrushed	Released: 27 September 2017; Label: Infectious; Formats: Digital download	—
2017 Live EP	Released: 11 December 2017; Label: Canvasback; Formats: Digital download	—
"—" denotes a recording that did not chart or was not released in that territory.

== Singles ==
List of singles, with selected chart positions and certifications, showing year released and album name
Title	Year	Peak chart positions										Certifications	Album
Title	Year	UK	AUS	AUT	CAN	FRA	HUN	IRL	NLD	SWI	US	Certifications	Album
"Bloodflood" / "Tessellate"	2011	—	—	—	—	—	—	—	—	—	—		An Awesome Wave
"Matilda"	2012	83	—	—	—	6	—	—	—	—	—	BPI: Silver	An Awesome Wave
"Breezeblocks"	2012	75	41	—	—	—	—	81	—	—	— (Note: "Breezeblocks" did not enter the Billboard Hot 100, but peaked at number 21 on the Bubbling Under Hot 100 Singles chart.)	BPI: 2× Platinum; ARIA: 4× Platinum; FIMI: Gold; RIAA: 3× Platinum	An Awesome Wave
"Tessellate"	2012	120	—	—	—	—	—	—	—	—	—	ARIA: Gold; RIAA: Gold	An Awesome Wave
"Something Good"	2012	76	—	—	—	—	—	—	—	—	—	BPI: Silver; ARIA: Gold	An Awesome Wave
"Fitzpleasure"	2012	— (Note: "Fitzpleasure" did not enter the UK Singles Chart, but peaked at number 68 on the UK Streaming Chart.)	—	47	—	—	—	—	—	—	—	BPI: Silver; RIAA: Gold	An Awesome Wave
"Dissolve Me"	2013	— (Note: "Dissolve Me" did not enter the UK Singles Chart, but peaked at number 13 on the Physical Singles Chart Top 100.)	—	—	—	—	—	—	—	—	—		An Awesome Wave
"Hunger of the Pine"	2014	59	71	—	—	147	—	63	— (Note: "Hunger of the Pine" did not enter the Netherlands' Single Top 100 but peaked on the Netherlands' Single Tip Chart at number 20.)	—	—	BPI: Silver; ARIA: Gold	This Is All Yours
"Left Hand Free"	2014	85	80	—	68	126	5	47	— (Note: "Left Hand Free" did not enter the Netherlands' Single Top 100 but peaked on the Netherlands' Single Tip Chart at number 18.)	—	99	BPI: Platinum; ARIA: 2× Platinum; RIAA: Gold	This Is All Yours
"Every Other Freckle"	2014	58	73	—	70	93	—	43	86	—	—	BPI: Silver; ARIA: Gold	This Is All Yours
"Warm Foothills"	2015	161	—	73	—	36	—	—	— (Note: "Warm Foothills" did not enter the Netherlands' Single Top 100 but peaked on the Netherlands' Single Tip Chart at number 19.)	51	—		This Is All Yours
"3WW"	2017	—	—	—	—	158	—	—	—	—	—		Relaxer
"In Cold Blood"	2017	—	—	—	—	166	—	—	—	—	—	ARIA: Gold	Relaxer
"Adeline"	2017	—	—	—	—	—	—	—	—	—	—		Relaxer
"Deadcrush"	2017	—	—	—	—	—	—	—	—	—	—	ARIA: Gold	Relaxer
"Pleader"	2017	—	—	—	—	—	—	—	—	—	—		Relaxer
"U&ME"	2021	—	—	—	—	—	—	—	—	—	—		The Dream
"Get Better"	2021	—	—	—	—	—	—	—	—	—	—		The Dream
"Hard Drive Gold"	2022	—	—	—	—	—	—	—	—	—	—		The Dream
"The Actor"	2022	—	—	—	—	—	—	—	—	—	—		The Dream
"—" denotes a recording that did not chart or was not released in that territory.

== Other charted songs ==
List of songs, with selected chart positions, showing year released and album name
Title	Year	Peak chart positions										Certifications	Album
Title	Year	UK	UK Indie	AUT	BEL (FL)	FRA	MEX	NLD	NZ Hot	POR	SWI	Certifications	Album
"Intro"	2012	— (Note: "Intro" did not enter the UK Singles Chart, but peaked at number 99 on the UK Streaming Chart.)	—	—	—	—	—	—	—	—	—		An Awesome Wave
"Dissolve Me"	2012	— (Note: "Dissolve Me" did not enter the UK Singles Chart, but peaked at number 73 on the UK Streaming Chart.)	—	—	—	—	44	—	—	—	—		An Awesome Wave
"Taro"	2012	— (Note: "Taro" did not enter the UK Singles Chart, but peaked at number 100 on the UK Streaming Chart.)	—	—	—	—	—	—	—	—	—	BPI: Silver	An Awesome Wave
"Intro"	2014	187	20	—	—	—	—	—	—	—	—		This Is All Yours
"Arrival in Nara"	2014	189	21	—	—	—	—	—	—	—	—		This Is All Yours
"Nara"	2014	200	19	—	—	—	—	—	—	—	—		This Is All Yours
"❦ (Garden of England)"	2014	180	20	—	—	40	—	— (Note: "Garden of England" did not enter the Netherlands' Single Top 100 but peaked on the Netherlands' Single Tip Chart at number 21.)	—	43	—		This Is All Yours
"Choice Kingdom"	2014	—	30	—	—	—	—	—	—	—	—		This Is All Yours
"The Gospel of John Hurt"	2014	168	18	75	—	37	—	— (Note: "The Gospel of John Hurt" did not enter the Netherlands' Single Top 100 but peaked on the Netherlands' Single Tip Chart at number 22.)	—	33	53		This Is All Yours
"Pusher"	2014	198	27	—	—	38	—	— (Note: "Pusher" did not enter the Netherlands' Single Top 100 but peaked on the Netherlands' Single Tip Chart at number 26.)	—	40	54		This Is All Yours
"Bloodflood, Pt. II"	2014	—	33	—	—	—	—	—	—	—	—		This Is All Yours
"Leaving Nara"	2014	—	48	—	—	—	—	—	—	—	—		This Is All Yours
"House of the Rising Sun"	2017	—	40	—	—	—	—	—	—	—	—		Relaxer
"Hares on the Mountain"	2017	—	—	—	— (Note: "Hares on the Mountain" did not enter the Flanders Ultratop Top 50, but charted as an extra tip on the Flanders Ultratop Bubbling Under chart.)	—	—	—	—	—	—		Bright: The Album
"Bane"	2022	—	—	—	—	—	—	—	31	—	—		The Dream
"Happier When You're Gone"	2022	—	—	—	—	—	—	—	37	—	—		The Dream
"The Actor"	2022	—	—	—	—	—	—	—	38	—	—		The Dream
"—" denotes a recording that did not chart or was not released in that territory.

== Other appearances ==
List of other appearances, showing year released and album name
Title	Year	Other artist(s)	Album
"Buffalo"	2012	Mountain Man	Silver Linings Playbook
"Every Other Freckle" (Remix)	2014	Big K.R.I.T.	See Me on Top IV
"Dancing in the Moonlight (It's Caught Me in Its Spotlight)"	2014	Various	The Saturday Sessions from The Dermot O'Leary Show
"Hares on the Mountain"	2017	N/A	Bright: The Album
"Breezeblocks – Tinlicker Remix"	2019	Tinlicker	This Is Not Our Universe

== Music videos ==
List of music videos, showing year released and directors
Title	Year	Director(s)
"Matilda"	2012	unknown
"Breezeblocks"	2012	Ellis Bahl
"Tessellate"	2012	Alex Southam
"Something Good"	2012	Brewer
"Fitzpleasure"	2012	Emile Sornin
"Taro"	2013	Melissa Murray
"Hunger of the Pine"	2014	Nabil
"Left Hand Free"	2014	Ryan Staake
"Every Other Freckle"	2014	Olivier Groulx
"Pusher"	2015	Thomas Rhazi
"3WW"	2017	Young Replicant
"In Cold Blood"	2017	Caspar Balslev
"Deadcrush"	2017	Young Replicant
"Pleader"	2017	Isaiah Seret
"U&ME"	2021	Prosper Unger-Hamilton
"Get Better"	2021	Stefanie Grunwald
"Hard Drive Gold"	2022	Joe Newman and Darcy Wallace
"The Actor Video 1"	2022	Thom Sonny Green
"The Actor Video 2"	2022	Saskia Dixie
