= List of awards and nominations received by Alt-J =

These are the awards and nominations received by Alt-J, an English indie rock band.

== Awards and nominations ==
Award	Year	Category	Nominee(s)	Result	Ref.
AIM Independent Music Awards	2012	Independent Breakthrough of the Year	Themselves	Won	
AIM Independent Music Awards	2013	Most Played New Independent Act	Themselves	Nominated	
AIM Independent Music Awards	2013	Hardest Working Band or Artist	Themselves	Nominated	
AIM Independent Music Awards	2015	Best Live Act	Themselves	Nominated	
AIM Independent Music Awards	2015	Independent Track of the Year	"Every Other Freckle"	Nominated	
AIM Independent Music Awards	2015	Independent Video of the Year	"Hunger of the Pine"	Nominated	
AIM Independent Music Awards	2017	Independent Album of the Year	Relaxer	Nominated	
Berlin Music Video Awards	2018	Best Cinematography	"3WW"	Nominated	
Berlin Music Video Awards	2018	Best Concept	"In Cold Blood"	Nominated	
Berlin Music Video Awards	2018	Best Direction	"Pleader"	Nominated	
Brit Awards	2013	British Breakthrough Act	Themselves	Nominated	
Brit Awards	2013	British Group	Themselves	Nominated	
Brit Awards	2013	British Album of the Year	An Awesome Wave	Nominated	
Brit Awards	2015	British Album of the Year	This Is All Yours	Nominated	
Brit Awards	2015	British Group	Themselves	Nominated	
Camerimage	2017	Best Music Video	"3WW"	Nominated	
Camerimage	2017	Best Music Video	"In Cold Blood"	Nominated	
Camerimage	2017	Best Cinematography	"In Cold Blood"	Won	
Camerimage	2018	Best Music Video	"Pleader"	Nominated	
D&AD Awards	2018	Best Cinematography	"3WW"	Wood Pencil	
European Festival Awards	2012	Newcomer of the Year	Themselves	Nominated	
European Festival Awards	2015	Headliner of the Year	Themselves	Nominated	
European Festival Awards	2015	Festival Anthem of the Year	"Left Hand Free"	Nominated	
Grammy Awards	2015	Best Alternative Music Album	This Is All Yours	Nominated	
Ivor Novello Awards	2013	Album Award	An Awesome Wave	Won	
Ivor Novello Awards	2013	Best Contemporary Song	"Fitzpleasure"	Nominated	
Ivor Novello Awards	2015	Best Contemporary Song	"Every Other Freckle"	Nominated	
MTV Video Music Awards	2013	Best Art Direction	"Tessellate"	Nominated	
MTV Video Music Awards	2015	Best Cinematography	"Left Hand Free"	Nominated	
mtvU Woodie Awards	2013	Breaking Woodie	Themselves	Nominated	
Mercury Prize	2012	Album of the Year	An Awesome Wave	Won	
Mercury Prize	2017	Album of the Year	Relaxer	Nominated	
Music Producers Guild Awards	2018	UK Album of the Year	Relaxer	Nominated	
Music Video Festival	2013	Best International Video	"Breezeblocks"	Nominated	
NME Awards	2013	Best Album	An Awesome Wave	Nominated	
NME Awards	2013	Best New Band	Themselves	Nominated	
NME Awards	2013	Worst Band	Themselves	Nominated	
NME Awards	2015	Best British Band	Themselves	Nominated	
NME Awards	2018	Best British Band	Themselves	Won	
Q Awards	2012	Best New Act	Themselves	Nominated	
Shark Music Video Awards	2018	Best Cinematography	"Pleader"	Won	
Shark Music Video Awards	2018	Best Color Grading	"Pleader"	Won	
Shark Music Video Awards	2018	Best Direction	"Pleader"	Won	
Shark Music Video Awards	2018	Best Post Production SFX	"Pleader"	Won	
Shark Music Video Awards	2018	Best Production Design	"Pleader"	Won	
Shark Music Video Awards	2018	Best Music Video	"Pleader"	Nominated	
UK Festival Awards	2012	Best Breakthrough Act	Themselves	Nominated	
UK Music Video Awards	2012	Best Alternative Video - UK	"Breezeblocks"	Won	
UK Music Video Awards	2012	Best Indie/Rock Video - UK	"Tessellate"	Nominated	
UK Music Video Awards	2014	Best Visual Effects in a Video	"Hunger of the Pine"	Won	
UK Music Video Awards	2014	Best Colour Grade in a Video	"Hunger of the Pine"	Nominated	
UK Music Video Awards	2014	Best Alternative Video – UK	"Hunger of the Pine"	Nominated	
UK Music Video Awards	2016	Best Artist	Themselves	Nominated	
UK Music Video Awards	2016	Best Alternative Video – UK	"Pusher"	Nominated	
UK Music Video Awards	2016	Best Alternative Video – UK	"Every Other Freckle"	Nominated	
UK Music Video Awards	2017	Best Alternative Video – UK	"Deadcrush"	Nominated	
UK Music Video Awards	2017	Best Alternative Video – UK	"In Cold Blood"	Nominated	
UK Music Video Awards	2017	Best Alternative Video – UK	"3WW"	Won	
UK Music Video Awards	2017	Best Cinematography in a Video	"3WW"	Won	
UK Music Video Awards	2017	Best Artist	Themselves	Nominated	
UK Music Video Awards	2017	Best Choreography in a Video	"Deadcrush"	Nominated	
UK Music Video Awards	2017	Best Editing in a Video	"Deadcrush"	Nominated	
UK Music Video Awards	2018	Best Editing in a Video	"Pleader"	Nominated	
UK Music Video Awards	2018	Best Colour Grading in a Video	"Pleader"	Nominated	
UK Music Video Awards	2018	Best Alternative Video - UK	"Pleader"	Won	
UK Music Video Awards	2022	Best Alternative Video - UK	"Hard Drive Gold"	Pending	
UK Music Video Awards	2022	Best Choreography in a Video	"The Actor"	Pending	
Webby Awards	2018	Best Art Direction	"Pleader"	Won	
YouTube Music Awards	2015	50 Artists to Watch	Themselves	Won	
