= 2017 UK Music Video Awards =

- Date: 26 October 2017
- Location: Roundhouse, London, United Kingdom
- Hosted by: Adam Buxton
- Website: www.ukmva.com

The 2017 UK Music Video Awards were held on 26 October 2017 to recognise the best in music videos from United Kingdom and worldwide. The nominations were announced on 21 September 2017.

== Video of the Year ==
Video of the Year

Young Thug – "Wyclef Jean"
(Director: Ryan Staake)

== Video genre categories ==
Best Pop Video – UK	Best Pop Video – International
Dua Lipa – "New Rules" (Director: Henry Scholfield): Aquilo – "You Won’t Know Where You Stand / Silhouette"; Charli XCX – "Boys"; Ed Sheeran – "Castle on the Hill"; Elton John – "Bennie and the Jets"; Jessie Ware – "Selfish Love"	Haim – "Want You Back" (Director: Jake Schreier): Cassius ft. Pharrell Williams & Cat Power – "Go Up"; Katy Perry – "Bon Appétit"; Lorde – "Green Light"; Oren Lavie ft. Vanessa Paradis – "Did You Really Say No"; The Weeknd – "False Alarm"
Best Dance Video – UK	Best Dance Video – International
Bonobo – "No Reason" (Director: Oscar Hudson): BICEP – "Aura"; Bonobo – "Kerala"; Duke Dumont x Gorgon City ft. Naations – "Real Life"; SOULS – "Bad Girl"; Stylo G + Jacob Plant – "Bike Engine"	The Blaze – "Territory" (Directors: Jonathan and Quillaume Alric (The Blaze)): Jain – "Makeba"; Joris Delacroix – "Start The Engine"; Kanye West – "Fade"; Majid Jordan ft. Somewhere Else – "Move Together"; The Avalanches – "Because I'm Me"
Best Rock/Indie Video – UK	Best Rock/Indie Video – International
Royal Blood – "Lights Out" (Directors: The Sacred Egg): All We Are – "Animal/Dance"; Coldplay – "Everglow"; Kasabian – "God Bless This Acid House"; Mick Jagger – "England, Lost"; Radiohead – "I Promise"	Father John Misty – "Things It Would Have Been Helpful to Know Before the Revolution" (Director: Chris Hopewell): Every Time I Die – "Map Change"; Mourn – "Irrational Friend"; Naive New Beaters – "Words Hurt"; The All-American Rejects – "Sweat"; Twenty One Pilots – "HeavyDirtySoul"
Best Alternative Video – UK	Best Alternative Video – International
alt-j – "3WW" (Director: Young Replicant): alt-j – "Deadcrush"; alt-j – "In Cold Blood"; Metronomy ft. Robyn – "Hang Me Out To Dry"; Sampha – "Process"; Young Fathers – "Mr Martyr"	Beck – "Up All Night" (Director: CANADA): Leningrad – "Kolshik"; Mashrou' Leila – "Roman"; Peder – "Shadows Of My Mind"; Polo & Pan – "Coeur Croisé"; The Avalanches – "Subways"
Best Urban Video – UK	Best Urban Video – International
Ray BLK – "Patience" (Director: Hector Dockrill): Loyle Carner – "Isle of Arran"; Mura Masa & A$AP Rocky – "Love$ick"; Rag'n'Bone Man – "Skin"; Sampha – "(No One Knows Me) Like The Piano"; Tinie Tempah – "Chasing Flies"	Young Thug – "Wyclef Jean" (Director: Ryan Staake): A$AP Mob ft. A$AP Rocky, A$AP Nast, Yung Lord, Skepta – "Money Man/Put That On My Set"; Frank Ocean – "Nikes"; Jay-Z – "Moonlight"; Kendrick Lamar – "ELEMENT."; Kendrick Lamar – "HUMBLE."
Best Pop Video – Newcomer	Best Dance Video – Newcomer
Charlotte Cardin – "Like It Doesn't Hurt" (Director: Kristof Brandl): Cartae – "Long Time"; Lea Santee – "Rollin'"; Poppy Ajudha – "Spilling Into You"; Slang – "What Happened To You"; Stars and Rabbit – "Man Upon The Hill"	Obongjayar – "Endless" (Director: Matilda Finn): Cathedrals – "Try To Fight"; Courage – "Latinman"; Fabich ft. Josh Barry – "Hold On"; Noga Erez – "Dance While You Shoot"; Punctual – "What I Love"
Best Rock/Indie Video – Newcomer	Best Alternative Video – Newcomer
Lemon Twigs – "I Want To Prove To You" (Director: Nick Rooney): Marika Hackman – "My Lover Cindy"; Microwave – "Vomit"; The Shins – "Half A Million"; Ultrasound – "Kon-Tiki"; Willie J Healey – "Would You Be"	Bonnie Banane – "L'Appétit" (Director: William Laboury): BadBadNotGood ft. Kaytranada – "Lavender"; Beyond The Wizard's Sleeve – "Black Crow"; Cherry Glazerr – "Told You I'd Be With The Guys"; Ghostpoet – "Freakshow"; Moses Sumney – "Worth It"
Best Urban Video – Newcomer	Vevo MUST SEE Award
Oscar Worldpeace – "Tate Modern, Wary, Pearls" (Director: Tax Tron Delix): Avelino ft. Stormzy & Skepta – "Energy"; Bossman Birdie – "Walk The Walk"; Monster Florence – "Resourceful"; Newham Generals ft Wiley – "Unruly"; Slick Don – "Highs & Lows"	Marika Hackman – "My Lover Cindy" (Director: Sam Bailey): Charli XCX – "Boys"; Dua Lipa – "New Rules"; Jay-Z – "The Story of O.J."; Kendrick Lamar – "HUMBLE."; Young Thug – "Wyclef Jean"

== Craft and technical categories ==
Best Production Design in a Video	Best Styling in a Video
Bonobo – "No Reason" (Production designer: Luke Moran Morris): Elton John – "Bennie and the Jets"; Frank Ocean – "Nikes"; Kendrick Lamar – "HUMBLE."; Sampha – "Process"; Young Thug & Carnage: Young Martha ft Meek Mill – "Homie"	The Blaze – "Territory" (Stylist: Juliette Alleaume): Beck – "Up All Night"; Frank Ocean – "Nikes"; Kendrick Lamar – "ELEMENT.; Police Dog Hogan – "Tyburn Jig"; Rosalía – "De Plata"
Best Choreography in a Video	Best Cinematography in a Video
Kanye West – "Fade" (Choreographers: Guapo, Jae Blaze, Derek ‘Bentley’ Watkins): alt-j – "Deadcrush"; Everything Everything – "Can't Do"; P!nk – "What About Us?"; Polo & Pan – "Coeur Croisé"; Sia – "The Greatest"	alt-j – "3WW" (DOP: Dustin Lane): Ed Sheeran – "Castle on the Hill"; Jimmy Whoo – "Motel Music part ll"; Kendrick Lamar – "ELEMENT."; Placebo – "Life's What You Make It"; The Avalanches – "Because I'm Me"
Best Color Grading in a Video	Best Editing in a Video
Mick Jagger – "Gotta Get a Grip" (Colourist: Mark Gethin at MPC LA): Jain – "Makeba"; Jay-Z & Damian Marley – "Bam"; Majid Jordan ft. Somewhere Else – "Move Together"; Radiohead – "I Promise"; The Hamilton Mixtape – "Immigrants (We Get The Job Done)"	Young Thug – "Wyclef Jean" (Editors: Ryan Staake & Eric Degliomini): alt-j – "Deadcrush"; Bonobo – "Kerala"; Elton John – "Bennie and the Jets"; Leningrad – "Kolshik"; The Rolling Stones – "Ride 'Em On Down"
Best Visual Effects in a Video	Best Animation in a Video
Leningrad – "Kolshik" (VFX: CGF): Arcade Fire – "Everything Everything"; Jain – "Makeba"; Majid Jordan ft. Somewhere Else – "Move Together"; Royal Blood – "Lights Out"; The Weeknd – "False Alarm"	Katie Melua – "Perfect World" (Animators: Karni & Saul): Elton John – "Rocket Man"; Father John Misty – "Things It Would Have Been Helpful To Know Before The Revolution"; Jay-Z – "The Story of O.J."; Kaada/Patton – "Red Rainbow"; The Avalanches – "Subways"

== Live and interactive categories ==
Best Live Session	Best Live Concert
Mura Masa ft. Damon Albarn – "Blu (Live)" (Director: Colin Solal Cardo): Alicia Keys in Paris – "A Take Away Show"; J Hus – "Common Sense (Four To The Floor, Channel4)"; London Grammar – "Rooting For You"; Mr Jukes – "Angels/Your Love (Live At The Church)"; Vevo Presents: The Weeknd – "False Alarm"	Rammstein – "Paris" (Director: Jonas Åkerlund): HAIM – "Behind The Album"; Metallica – "Hardwired at House of Vans"; The Killers – "Hyde Park"; The Rolling Stones – "Trip Across Latin America"; Toro Y Moi – "Love From Trona"
Best Interactive Video
Naïve New Beaters – "Words Hurt" (Director: Romain Chassaing): Björk – "Notget"; The Chainsmokers – "Paris VR"; Gorillaz – "Saturnz Barz (Spirit House) 360"; N'to – "Chez Nous (Fantasynth)"; Portugal. The Man – "Rich Friends"

== Individual and company categories ==
Best Artist	Best Commissioner
Kendrick Lamar: alt-j; Bonobo; Radiohead; Sampha; The Weeknd	Semera Khan: Andrew Law; Elizabeth Doonan; James Hackett; John Moule; Phil Lee
Best Production Company	Best Producer
Pulse Films: Agile Films; Caviar; Friend; Iconoclast; Riff Raff Films	Nathan Schrrer: Amber Millington; Clemence Cuvelier; Katie Lambert; Natalie Arnett; Tom Birmingham
Best Director	Best New Director
Oscar Hudson: Dent de Cuir; Georgia Hudson; Jake Schreier; Ryan Staake; Young Replicant	Matilda Finn: Hector Dockrill; Max Weiland; Salomon Ligthelm; Thomas James; Zhang + Knight
