= Reduxer =

Remix album by Alt-J
- Released: 28 September 2018
- Length: 43:07
- Label: Infectious; Atlantic

Alt-J chronology
Relaxer (2017)	Reduxer (2018)	The Dream (2022)

Singles from Reduxer
- 1. "In Cold Blood (Twin Shadow Version)" Released: 14 June 2018; 2. "3WW (OTG Version)" Released: 14 August 2018; 3. "In Cold Blood (Kontra K Version)" Released: 31 August 2018; 4. "Deadcrush (Alchemist x Trooko Version)" Released: 5 September 2018; 5. "Last Year (Terrace Martin Version)" Released: 18 September 2018

Reduxer is the first remix album by English indie rock band Alt-J, released on 28 September 2018 by Infectious Music and the Canvasback Music division of Atlantic Records. It contains remixes of songs from their third studio album, Relaxer, done by various producers and featuring a number of different vocalists, mainly hip-hop artists.

== Critical reception ==
Professional ratings
Aggregate scores
Source	Rating
Metacritic	66/100
Review scores
Source	Rating
AllMusic	3.5/5 stars
Drowned In Sound	6/10
The Line of Best Fit	7.5/10
No Ripcord	5/10
PopMatters	6/10

Reduxer received a 66 on aggregator Metacritic, indicating "generally favorable" reviews.

== Track listing ==
All tracks are written by Gus Unger-Hamilton, Joe Newman, and Thom Sonny Green except where noted.

Reduxer track listing
No.	Title	Writer(s)	Length
1.	"3WW" (OTG version; featuring Little Simz)		5:07
2.	"In Cold Blood" (Twin Shadow version; featuring Pusha T)	Gus Unger-Hamilton; Joe Newman; Kontra K; Pusha T; Thom Green	2:47
3.	"House of the Rising Sun" (Tuka version; featuring Tuka)	Gus Unger-Hamilton; Joe Newman; Thom Green; Traditional	5:50
4.	"Hit Me Like That Snare" (Jimi Charles Moody version)		4:32
5.	"Deadcrush" (Alchemist x Trooko version; featuring Danny Brown)	Gus Unger-Hamilton; Daniel Sewell; Joe Newman; Thom Green	4:03
6.	"Adeline" (ADP version; featuring Paigey Cakey and Hex)	Brendan Francis Behan; Gus Unger-Hamilton; Hans Zimmer; Joe Newman; Thom Green	3:47
7.	"Last Year" (Terrace Martin version; featuring GoldLink)		4:18
8.	"Pleader" (Trooko version; featuring PJ Sin Suela)		4:46
9.	"3WW" (Lomepal version; featuring Lomepal)		3:16
10.	"In Cold Blood" (Kontra K version; featuring Kontra K)	Gus Unger-Hamilton; Joe Newman; Kontra K; Thom Green	3:35
11.	"Hit Me Like That Snare" (Rejjie Snow version; featuring Rejjie Snow)		3:00
Total length:			43:07

== Charts ==
Chart performance for Reduxer
Chart (2018)	Peak position
Belgian Albums (Ultratop Flanders)	76
Belgian Albums (Ultratop Wallonia)	125
French Albums (SNEP)	133
Dutch Albums (MegaCharts)	120
US Billboard 200	38
