= Adeline (song) =

Single by Alt-J

from the album Relaxer
- Released: 24 May 2017
- Genre: Art pop; folktronica
- Length: 5:50
- Label: Infectious; Atlantic
- Songwriters: Joe Newman; Gus Unger-Hamilton; Thom Sonny Green; Hans Zimmer
- Producer: Charlie Andrew

Alt-J singles chronology
"In Cold Blood" (2017)	"Adeline" (2017)	"Deadcrush" (2017)

"Adeline" is a song by British indie rock band Alt-J. It is the sixth track and third single from their third studio album, Relaxer, and was released as a digital single on 24 May 2017 by Infectious Music and Atlantic Records. The song was written by Joe Newman, Gus Unger-Hamilton and Thom Sonny Green and produced by Charlie Andrew. The band adapted a melody from the soundtrack to The Thin Red Line by Hans Zimmer, who is credited on the song as a writer. The band described the song's narrative as "a Tasmanian devil falls in love with a woman as he watches her swim."

== Composition and lyrics ==
In an interview with NPR, the band said:

This song was written on the road while we were touring our second album. It's about a Tasmanian devil that falls in love with a woman he watches swimming every day. As Adeline swims, she sings the Irish song 'The Auld Triangle', which is a favorite song of ours to sing when we are traveling and/or drinking.

== Critical reception ==
"Adeline" received favorable reviews from contemporary music critics. Samantha Lopez of Paste called it a "sweeping five-minute, multi-layered melody packed with classically trained instrumentals and symphonic textures."

== Remix ==
The song was remixed by American metallic hardcore band Code Orange and was released as a single on 2 November 2017. It was released alongside a separate single for a remix of the Relaxer track "Hit Me Like That Snare", also remixed by Code Orange.

This song was later given a remix as part of the remix album Reduxer with the album's release on September 28, 2018. This remix was done by British producer ADP and features vocal from UK rappers Hex and Paigey Cakey.

== Track listing ==
Digital download
No.	Title	Length
1.	"Adeline"	5:50

== Personnel ==
Credits adapted from Tidal

=== Alt-J ===
- Joe Newman – guitar, vocals
- Gus Unger-Hamilton – keyboards, vocals
- Thom Sonny Green – drums, percussion, programming

=== Additional musicians ===
- London Metropolitan Orchestra – strings

=== Technical ===
- Charlie Andrew – production, mixing, engineering, programming
- Brett Cox – engineering
- Jay Pocknell - engineering
- Stefano Civetta – assistant engineering
- Paul Pritchard – assistant engineering
- Graeme Baldwin – assistant engineering
- Dick Beetham – mastering

=== Artwork and design ===
- Osamu Sato

== Charts ==
Chart (2017)	Peak position
UK Indie (Official Charts)	38
