= Pleader (song) =

Single by Alt-J

from the album Relaxer
- Released: 15 September 2017
- Length: 5:49 (album version); 2:38 (single version)
- Label: Infectious; Atlantic
- Songwriters: Joe Newman; Gus Unger-Hamilton; Thom Sonny Green
- Producer: Charlie Andrew

Alt-J singles chronology
"Deadcrush" (2017)	"Pleader" (2017)	"U&ME" (2021)

"Pleader" is a song by British indie rock band Alt-J. It is the eighth and final track (and fifth and final single) from their third studio album, Relaxer, and was released as a shortened radio edit digital single on 15 September 2017 by Infectious Music and Atlantic Records. The song was written by Joe Newman, Gus Unger-Hamilton and Thom Sonny Green and produced by Charlie Andrew.

== Composition and lyrics ==
In an interview with NPR, the band said:

The last track on the record is based on Richard Llewelyn's book How Green Was My Valley?, about a small mining community in nineteenth-century Wales. The song takes the form of a hymn, and so we went to Ely Cathedral in Cambridgeshire to record the boys' choir and the organ there, to add a church feeling to the track. It is a long song, but we felt the sense of pride and hope it leaves by the end made it the right choice for ending the album.

The novel is referenced throughout the song, including the lyric "How green, how green was my valley?".

== Music video ==
The music video for "Pleader" was released on 15 November 2017, directed by Isaiah Seret. It was executive produced by Rupert Reynolds-MacLean and produced by Sonya Sier.

== Remix ==
The song was remixed by Mr Jukes, a music project of British musician Jack Steadman of the band Bombay Bicycle Club. The remix features British group the Age of L.U.N.A. and was released as a single on 25 October 2017.

== Track listing ==
Digital download
No.	Title	Length
1.	"Pleader (Edit)"	2:38

== Personnel ==
Credits adapted from Tidal.

=== Alt-J ===
- Joe Newman – guitar, vocals
- Gus Unger-Hamilton – keyboards, vocals
- Thom Sonny Green – drums, percussion, programming

=== Additional musicians ===
- Ely Cathedral Boy Choristers – choir
- London Metropolitan Orchestra – strings
- Mark Rainbow – background vocals

=== Technical ===
- Charlie Andrew – production, mixing, engineering, programming
- Brett Cox – engineering
- Jay Pocknell - engineering
- Stefano Civetta – assistant engineering
- Paul Pritchard – assistant engineering
- Graeme Baldwin – assistant engineering
- Dick Beetham – mastering

=== Artwork and design ===
- Osamu Sato
