= Deadcrush =

Single by Alt-J

from the album Relaxer
- Released: 12 July 2017
- Genre: Indietronica
- Length: 3:52
- Label: Infectious; Atlantic
- Songwriters: Joe Newman; Gus Unger-Hamilton; Thom Sonny Green
- Producer: Charlie Andrew

Alt-J singles chronology
"Adeline" (2017)	"Deadcrush" (2017)	"Pleader" (2017)

"Deadcrush" is a song by British indie rock band Alt-J. It is the fifth track and fourth single from their third studio album, Relaxer, and was released as a digital single on 12 July 2017 by Infectious Music and Atlantic Records. The song was written by Joe Newman, Gus Unger-Hamiltion, and Thom Sonny Green and produced by Charlie Andrew. The song's title is based on a game the band played where they asked the question, "What historical figure would I want to take on a date if she were alive today?", and so the name "Deadcrush" is based on someone's "dead crush". It features vocals from Ellie Rowsell of Wolf Alice. The song was also featured in the soundtrack for FIFA 18.

== Composition and lyrics ==
In an interview with NPR, the band said:

As we were finishing writing our second album, This Is All Yours, we came up with a quick jam which we luckily captured on one of our phones. This turned into 'Deadcrush', which is a word we made up to describe someone who is no longer alive that you fancy. Thus the first verse is about Lee Miller, Joe's deadcrush, the second about Anne Boleyn, Gus's.

== Music video ==
A music video for the song was released on 12 July 2017. It was directed by Young Replicant, who also directed the music video for "3WW". It features the band's "dead crushes": Sylvia Plath, Lee Miller, and Anne Boleyn teaming up in a post-apocalyptic world.

== Official video ==
The choreography was designed by Darcy Wallace, performed by Leah Marojević, Alana Everett and Natalia Iwaniec.

== Live performances ==
The band performed "Deadcrush" at the 2017 Mercury Prize ceremony at the Eventim Apollo in London on 14 September 2017. Relaxer was shortlisted for the prize.

== Track listing ==
Digital download
No.	Title	Length
1.	"Deadcrush"	3:52

== Personnel ==
Credits adapted from Tidal.

=== Alt-J ===
- Joe Newman – guitar, vocals
- Gus Unger-Hamilton – keyboards, vocals
- Thom Sonny Green – drums, percussion, programming

=== Additional musicians ===
- London Metropolitan Orchestra – strings
- Ellie Rowsell – vocals

=== Technical ===
- Charlie Andrew – production, mixing, engineering, programming
- Brett Cox – engineering
- Jay Pocknell - engineering
- Stefano Civetta – assistant engineering
- Paul Pritchard – assistant engineering
- Graeme Baldwin – assistant engineering
- Dick Beetham – mastering

=== Artwork and design ===
- Osamu Sato

== Charts ==
Chart (2017)	Peak position
Belgium (Ultratip Bubbling Under Flanders)	29
New Zealand Heatseekers (RMNZ)	10
UK Indie (Official Charts)	23

== Certifications ==
Certifications for "Deadcrush"
Region	Certification	Certified units/sales
Australia (ARIA)	Gold	35,000^{‡}
New Zealand (RMNZ)	Gold	15,000^{‡}
^{‡} Sales+streaming figures based on certification alone.

== Deadcrushed ==
Deadcrushed

EP by Alt-J
- Released: 27 September 2017
- Length: 35:13
- Label: Infectious; Atlantic

Singles from Deadcrushed
- 1. "Deadcrush (Spike Stent Mix)" Released: 4 August 2017; 2. "Deadcrush (Ben De Vrie Remix)" Released: 16 August 2017; 3. "Deadcrush (Lea Porcelain Remix)" Released: 23 August 2017; 4. "Deadcrush (Salute Remix)" Released: 30 August 2017

Four remixes of "Deadcrush", by Spike Stent, Ben de Vries, Lea Porcelain, and Salute, were individually released by Alt-J as digital singles in August 2017. A collection of the remix singles, excluding the remix by Spike Stent, was released as an EP on 27 September 2017 with additional remixes by Damian Lazarus, Otzeki, Miro Shot, and Vesica.

Digital download
No.	Title	Length
1.	"Deadcrush" (Damian Lazarus Remix)	8:54
2.	"Deadcrush" (Salute Remix)	4:18
3.	"Deadcrush" (Lea Porcelain Remix)	4:09
4.	"Deadcrush" (Otzeki Remix)	4:22
5.	"Deadcrush" (Miro Shot Remix)	4:30
6.	"Deadcrush" (Vesica Remix)	4:34
7.	"Deadcrush" (Ben De Vrie Remix)	4:26
