= High anxiety =

High anxiety is a non-technical term referring to a state of extreme fear or apprehension. It may also mean:

== Music ==
=== Albums ===
- High Anxiety (Therapy? album), a 2003 problem by Therapy?.
- High Anxiety (Thom Sonny Green album), a 2016 album by Thom Sonny Green.
- High Anxiety, a 2014 album by Pet Lamb (recorded in 1995)
- High Anxiety, a 2025 album by 2Slimey

=== Songs ===
- "High Anxiety", a song on the A Match and Some Gasoline album by the Suicide Machines
- "High Anxiety", a song from Sugar Ray's album Floored

== Television episodes ==
- "High Anxiety", an episode of 7th Heaven
- "High Anxiety" (Dawson's Creek), 2001
- "High Anxiety", an episode of A Different World
- "High Anxiety" (Doctors), 2004
- "High Anxiety", an episode of Full House
- "High Anxiety", The Golden Girls episode
- "High Anxiety", an episode of Kate & Allie
- "High Anxiety" (Part 2), an episode of King of the Hill
- "Episode 3: High Anxiety", an episode from Rayman: The Animated Series
- "High Anxiety", an episode from Rescue Heroes (originally named Terror in the Tower, but retitled after the September 11 attack, then got banned from Teletoon shortly after)

== Other ==
- High Anxiety, a 1977 film by Mel Brooks

== See also ==
- Anxiety (mood)
- Anxiety disorder
- Panic attack
- Fight-or-flight response
