= Joe Newman (English musician) =

English musician (born 1987)

- Newman in 2017

Background information
- Also known as: JJerome87
- Born: Joe Jerome Newman; October 6, 1987 (age 39); England
- Origin: Leeds
- Genres: Indie rock, alt-rock, folktronica, art rock
- Occupations: Musician, singer, songwriter
- Instruments: Vocals, guitar
- Years active: 2007–present
- Label: Infectious Records
- Website: https://jjerome87.com/

Joe Jerome Newman (born October 6th, 1987) is an English musician best known as the lead vocalist, guitarist, and primary songwriter of the band alt-J. The band achieved international recognition with their debut album An Awesome Wave (2012), which won the Mercury Prize. Their second album, This Is All Yours (2014), was nominated for a Grammy..

== Early life and education ==
Newman attended the University of Leeds, where he studied fine art and met future bandmates Gus Unger-Hamilton, Thom Sonny Green, and Gwil Sainsbury. The group formed while attending university, initially performing in their college accommodation under the name "Daljit Dhaliwal" and "FILMS" before ultimately changing to ∆ (alt-J)

== Career ==
=== alt-J ===
Newman formed alt-J in 2007 with his university peers. The band released their debut album, An Awesome Wave, in 2012 to critical acclaim, winning the Mercury Prize. Their follow-up album, This Is All Yours, was released after the departure of bassist Gwil Sainsbury and marked a period of adjustment for the group.

In interviews following their early success, Newman described the transition to mainstream recognition as sudden and disorienting. The band continued to develop their sound on subsequent releases, including Relaxer (2017) and The Dream (2022).

=== Solo work ===
In late 2025, Newman released his first solo album, "The Canyon," under the name JJerome87 – exclusively available for purchase through his website. The album was released to streaming on June 26, 2026.

== Musical style ==
Newman is noted for his distinctive vocal delivery and unconventional phrasing. His guitar playing style often incorporates fingerpicking techniques and alternative tunings.

His songwriting frequently draws on literary references to books and movies and explores dark or surreal subject matter.

== Discography ==
=== With Alt-J ===
- An Awesome Wave (2012)
- This Is All Yours (2014)
- Relaxer (2017)
- The Dream (2022)

=== Solo ===
- The Canyon (2025)
