= Relaxer (album) =

Studio album by Alt-J
- Released: 2 June 2017
- Recorded: August 2016 – January 2017
- Studios: Iguana Studios, Brixton; Abbey Road Studios, Westminster; The Church Studios, Crouch End; Strongroom Studios, Shoreditch; Ely Cathedral, Ely
- Genres: Pop; alternative rock; folk
- Length: 38:59
- Labels: Infectious; Atlantic
- Producer: Charlie Andrew

Alt-J chronology
This Is All Yours (2014)	Relaxer (2017)	Reduxer (2018)

Singles from Relaxer
- 1. "3WW" Released: 6 March 2017; 2. "In Cold Blood" Released: 29 March 2017; 3. "Adeline" Released: 24 May 2017; 4. "Deadcrush" Released: 12 July 2017; 5. "Pleader" Released: 15 September 2017

Relaxer (stylised as RELAXER) is the third studio album by English indie rock band Alt-J, released on 2 June 2017 by Infectious Music and the Canvasback Music division of Atlantic Records. It was originally scheduled to be released on 9 June 2017 but the band later decided to release it a week earlier.

The band recorded Relaxer in London with producer Charlie Andrew, who also produced Alt-J's first two albums. It includes songs composed entirely during the album's recording and songs dating back to the band's formative years at the University of Leeds. Six of the album's eight tracks feature strings arranged by Alt-J and performed by the London Metropolitan Orchestra. "House of the Rising Sun" is a rearrangement of the traditional folk tune with additional verses from the band. "3WW" and "Deadcrush" feature guest vocals from Ellie Rowsell of Wolf Alice and "Last Year" features guest vocals from Marika Hackman, who sang on Alt-J's previous album.

Alt-J promoted Relaxer with the singles "3WW", "In Cold Blood", "Adeline", "Deadcrush" and "Pleader", with music videos for all except "Adeline". The band also enlisted Japanese artist Osamu Sato to create a playable online game inspired by his own game LSD: Dream Emulator as part of the promotion for Relaxer. The album's artwork features a screenshot from Sato's game. The band embarked on the Relaxer Tour on 10 June 2017 with performances at festivals including Glastonbury and Lollapalooza. The album was nominated for the 2017 Mercury Prize. A remix album of tracks from Relaxer titled Reduxer was released on 28 September 2018.

== Background and recording ==
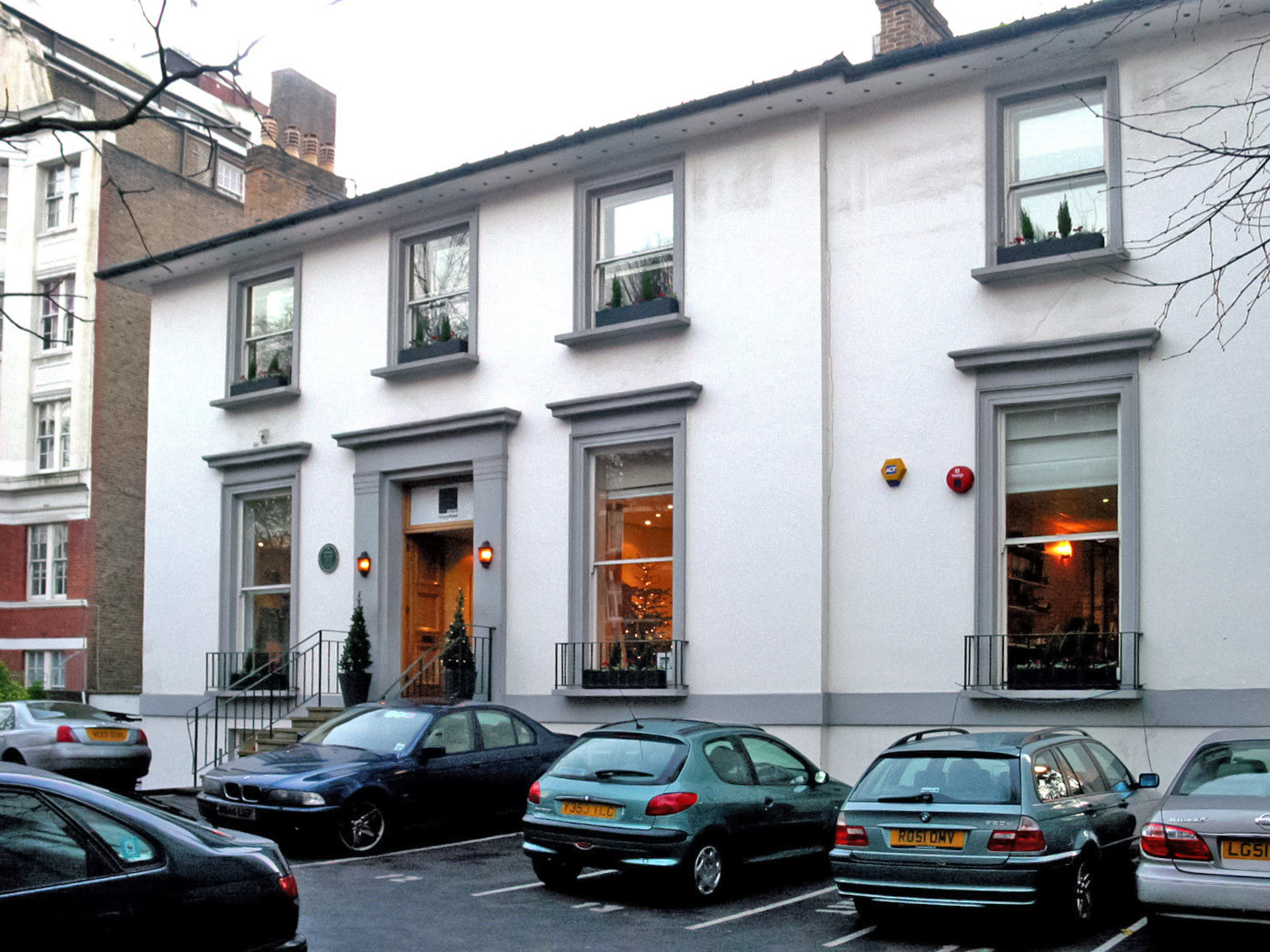
The band recorded string and brass sections at London's famed Abbey Road Studios (pictured)

In 2014, Alt-J released their second studio album This Is All Yours to commercial success, going straight to number 1 on the UK Albums Chart. The band began touring in September 2014, performing for the first time since the departure of group member Gwil Sainsbury. They toured to the end of 2015, headlining their largest US show at Madison Square Garden. The band's popularity grew further when their songs were featured in films, television shows and commercials. The album was nominated for Best Alternative Music Album at the 57th Grammy Awards.

In December 2015, Alt-J finished performing the final shows of their tour in support of This Is All Yours. The band returned to London, taking their first break from writing and touring since the recording of their debut album An Awesome Wave in 2011. Drummer Thom Sonny Green released his solo debut album High Anxiety on 19 August 2016; keyboardist Gus Unger-Hamilton started Dandy Café, a pop-up restaurant in London Fields; and lead vocalist Joe Newman took time off, during which he watched films.

The band reconvened in a writing studio in North London to "take the bubble wrap off" their ideas for new material and eventually began recording for the album in August 2016.

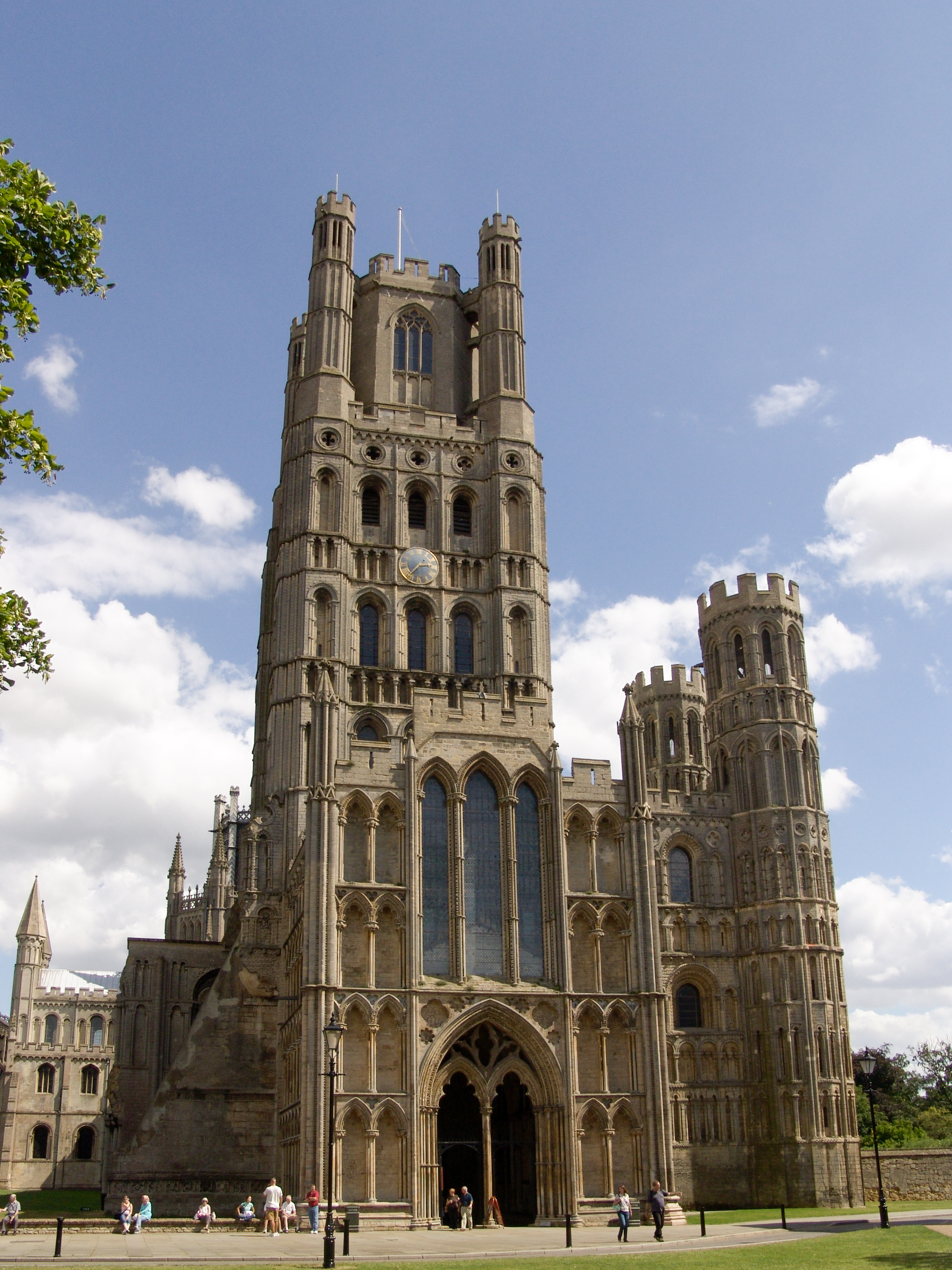
alt-J experimented with field recording on Relaxer, and visited Ely Cathedral (pictured) in Cambridgeshire to record the cathedral's organ and boys' choir

In November 2016, Alt-J traveled to Ely, a cathedral city in Cambridgeshire, to conduct field recordings of its organ and its boys' choir, which Unger-Hamilton was a member of during his youth. They also recorded burning sounds from the cathedral's cast iron heaters and the sounds of visitors walking its floors.

The band recorded string sections for "3WW" and "Adeline" and brass sections for "In Cold Blood" in Studio Two of London's famed Abbey Road Studios in Westminster, which they revealed on Instagram in January 2017.

== Music and lyrics ==
"In Cold Blood" features "interweaving vocals" underpinned by the "flashes" of a brass section and the "bleeping electronics" of a Casiotone purchased by the band for £1.05 on eBay.

"House of the Rising Sun" is a rearrangement of the traditional folk tune with additional verses from the band. It begins on the traditional chorus and first verse of Woody Guthrie's version, with minor differences. The second verse is original and was written by Joe Newman. The song is also structured around a separate original chorus written by the band. Unger-Hamilton described the song as an "original piece of work and not just chucking in a cover to fill space as it were." It features twenty classical guitarists playing at once, which Unger-Hamilton likened to the work of John Cage: "you're not just hearing the guitar riffs, you're hearing the sound of the room, you're hearing 20 different people's fingers creaking on the neck. And you're listening to everything, and that's what you get from doing it properly and not just layering up one person 20 times."

"Hit Me Like That Snare" is a "garage-rock" jam inspired by "Decks Dark" by Radiohead. The song is about a person who goes to experience a sex hotel and wanders from room to room. It contains the lyric "We're going down, fuck my life in half", which is taken from when Joe Newman was driving to London from Southampton with his girlfriend when his car hit a large puddle and he screamed, "Fuck my life in half."

The Guardian likened the music of "Deadcrush" to that of Nine Inch Nails, whereas PopMatters compared it to that of Depeche Mode.

"Last Year" is a gentle "acoustic lullaby", closing on a bassoon solo. In the first half, Joe Newman sings from the point of view of a man experiencing a decline in his mental health in 2016. It is sung chronologically, with Newman listing each month followed by the man's reflection. The second half of the song introduces Marika Hackman singing as the man's ex-girlfriend, who broke up with him in January and is now singing at his funeral in December.

"Pleader" is a "theatrical crescendo" that prominently features orchestral strings and Spanish guitar. Its lyrics are based on the plot of Richard Llewellyn's book How Green Was My Valley, about a small mining community in nineteenth-century Wales. The book's title is repeated in the song's refrain. It is structured as a hymn and features the boys' choir and the organ of Ely Cathedral, which were added to give a "church feeling" to the song. Unger-Hamilton described it as a "pastoral celebration of a time that's no longer, a time that's gone."

The title Relaxer was originally the name of song made by drummer Thom Sonny Green and was then originally in the lyrics for "Deadcrush". Green felt that the name seemed to fit the album overall, stating, "We do always want our albums to be listened to as a single piece of music."

== Promotion and release ==
On 3 March 2017, Alt-J uploaded a one-minute video to social media containing new music and what was reported to be footage from the 1998 video game LSD. The video was tagged with the title "00110011 01110111 01110111", which is binary code for "3ww". On 6 March 2017, Relaxer was announced with a 9 June 2017 release date and its first single "3WW" was released with an accompanying visualizer video similar to LSD. On 29 March 2017, Alt-J premiered "In Cold Blood" on MistaJam's BBC Radio 1 show as his 'Hottest Record in the World'. It was released the same day with an accompanying visualizer video as the album's second single. The band also announced that they decided to release the album a week earlier on 2 June 2017. "Adeline" was released on 24 May 2017 with an accompanying visualizer video as Relaxer's third single. On 12 July 2017, "Deadcrush" was released as the fourth single from the album, with a music video. On 15 September 2017, an edit of "Pleader" was released as the fifth and final single. A music video for "Pleader" was released on 15 November 2017.

A music video for "3WW" was released on 13 April 2017. An Iggy Pop-narrated music video for "In Cold Blood" was released on 9 May 2017. Alt-J partnered with director Alex Takacs for a second time for the music video for "Deadcrush" and released it on 12 July 2017.

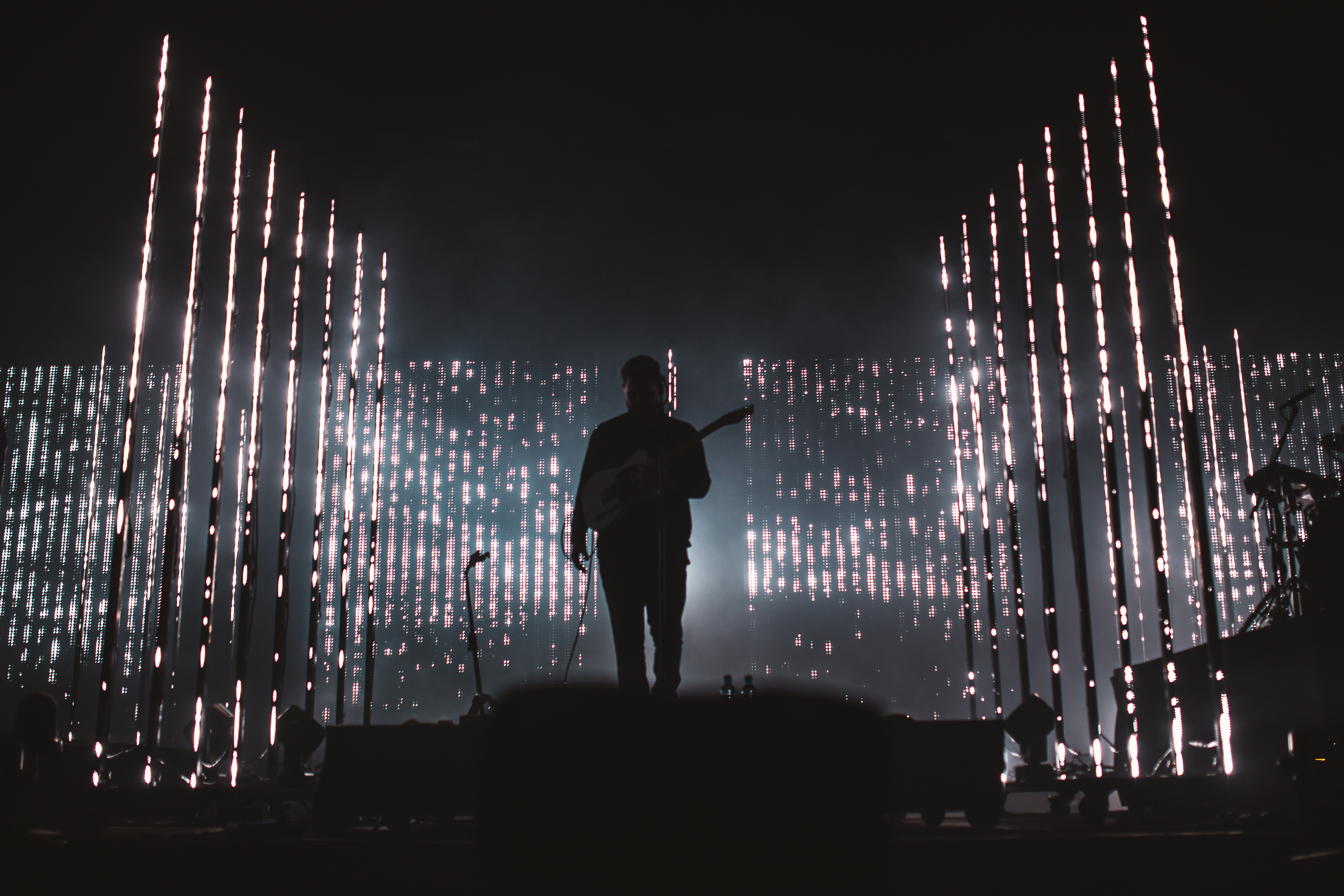
alt-J performing during the Relaxer Tour, at Positivus Festival 2017 in Zvejnieku Parks, Salacgrīva, Latvia.

On 19 May 2017, Alt-J performed "3WW" and "In Cold Blood" on the sixth episode of the fiftieth series of Later... with Jools Holland, accompanied by Ellie Rowsell on "3WW". On 18 April 2017, Alt-J performed "In Cold Blood" on the 656th episode of The Tonight Show Starring Jimmy Fallon. The band performed the song with a backing horn section and with Questlove, the drummer of Jimmy Fallon's house band The Roots. On 5 June 2017, Alt-J performed "In Cold Blood" on Conan.

=== Tour ===
A world tour in support of Relaxer began on 10 June 2017 in Rouen, France. The tour features several performances at music festivals, including Glastonbury, the Montreux Jazz Festival and Lollapalooza. It includes dates in Australia, New Zealand, Japan, Indonesia and all across Europe and North America.

On 11 December 2017, alt-j released 2017 Live EP. Released as a free digital download on Canvasback Music's website, the EP collects live recordings of "Deadcrush", "Hit Me Like That Snare", "Dissolve Me", "Every Other Freckle" and "Pleader" performed by the band during the North American leg of the Relaxer Tour.

== Artwork ==
Artwork for Relaxer's cover and promotional material was taken from the 1998 PlayStation video game LSD: Dream Emulator by Japanese artist Osamu Sato.

== Critical reception ==
Professional ratings
Aggregate scores
Source	Rating
AnyDecentMusic?	6.7/10
Metacritic	65/100
Review scores
Source	Rating
AllMusic	3.5/5 stars
The A.V. Club	C+
The Daily Telegraph	4/5 stars
The Guardian	3/5 stars
The Independent	3/5 stars
NME	4/5 stars
Pitchfork	4.5/10
Q	4/5 stars
Rolling Stone	3/5 stars
Uncut	6/10

At Metacritic, which assigns a normalised rating out of 100 to reviews from mainstream publications, Relaxer received an average score of 65, based on 27 reviews. In The Daily Telegraph, chief critic Neil McCormick found it "deeply gorgeous and utterly baffling", labelling it "internet era pop" with its "barrier-free absorption of so many different musical styles a product of the computer recording technology it is created with." Lisa Wright of DIY praised the album, stating Alt-J have "crafted possibly the most strangely original niche in modern music." Kyle Mullin of Under the Radar praised the album's diversity: "This all-over-the-map approach makes Relaxer a bit dizzying and tough to digest at first, and yet you'll be immediately captivated and intrigued by its distinctive mix. And once you give it a few more listens, many of its varied songs will worm their way into your ears as some of this summer's best indie rock offerings."

In a negative review, Jayson Greene of Pitchfork said, "The truth is that alt-J have never had an identity, really, apart from Newman's mangled lyrics and the fidgety, distracted arrangements of their songs. RELAXER shows us what remains after those quirks are dialed back: some perfectly nice, perfectly blank lads who have no idea why they are standing in front of you and even less of an idea what to say."

=== Accolades ===
Relaxer was shortlisted for the 2017 Mercury Prize. The band previously won the prize in 2012 for their debut album An Awesome Wave.

Publication	Accolade	Year	Rank	Ref.
NME	NME's Albums of the Year 2017	2017	38	
Q	50 Best Albums of 2017	2017	45	

== Track listing ==
All tracks are written by Joe Newman, Gus Unger-Hamilton and Thom Sonny Green, except where noted.

Relaxer track listing
No.	Title	Writer(s)	Length
1.	"3WW"		5:00
2.	"In Cold Blood"		3:26
3.	"House of the Rising Sun"	Traditional	5:20
4.	"Hit Me Like That Snare"		3:37
5.	"Deadcrush"		3:52
6.	"Adeline"	Joe Newman; Gus Unger-Hamilton; Thom Sonny Green; Hans Zimmer	5:50
7.	"Last Year"		6:06
8.	"Pleader"		5:48
Total length:			38:59

=== Notes ===
- "3WW" features vocals by Ellie Rowsell.
- "Deadcrush" features vocals by Ellie Rowsell.
- "Last Year" features vocals by Marika Hackman.

Sample credits

- "House of the Rising Sun" is a rearrangement of the traditional folk tune "The House of the Rising Sun", with an additional verse written by the band themselves.
- "Adeline" adapts a melody from Hans Zimmer's score of The Thin Red Line.

== Personnel ==
Credits adapted from Tidal, AllMusic and Discogs

=== Alt-J ===
- Joe Newman – bass, guitar, vocals
- Thom Sonny Green – drums, percussion, programming
- Gus Unger-Hamilton – keyboards, vocals

=== Additional musicians ===
- Ellie Rowsell – vocals (1, 5)
- Marika Hackman – vocals (7)
- Jon Whitten – yangqin
- Hinako Omori – background vocals (4)
- Ely Cathedral Boy Choristers – choir (8)
- London Metropolitan Orchestra – strings (1, 3, 5–8)
- Joe Auckland – trumpet (2)
- Adrian Hallowell – trombone (2)
- Mike Kearsey – trombone (2)
- Trevor Mires – trombone (2)
- Martin Williams – tenor saxophone (2)

=== Technical ===
- Charlie Andrew – production, mixing, engineering, programming
- Brett Cox – engineering
- Jay Pocknell – engineering
- Stefano Civetta – assistant engineering
- Paul Pritchard – assistant engineering
- Graeme Baldwin – assistant engineering
- Dick Beetham – mastering

=== Artwork and design ===
- Osamu Sato

== Charts ==
=== Weekly charts ===
Chart (2017)	Peak position
Australian Albums (ARIA)	4
Austrian Albums (Ö3 Austria)	4
Belgian Albums (Ultratop Flanders)	4
Belgian Albums (Ultratop Wallonia)	7
Canadian Albums (Billboard)	7
Czech Albums (ČNS IFPI)	23
Dutch Albums (Album Top 100)	12
French Albums (SNEP)	11
German Albums (Offizielle Top 100)	13
Irish Albums (IRMA)	9
Italian Albums (FIMI)	25
New Zealand Albums (RMNZ)	12
Portuguese Albums (AFP)	23
Scottish Albums (Official Charts)	8
Spanish Albums (Promusicae)	43
Swedish Albums (Sverigetopplistan)	47
Swiss Albums (Schweizer Hitparade)	3
UK Albums (Official Charts)	6
US Billboard 200	14

=== Year-end charts ===
Chart (2017)	Position
Belgian Albums (Ultratop Flanders)	53
Belgian Albums (Ultratop Wallonia)	186

== Certifications ==
Region	Certification	Certified units/sales
United Kingdom (BPI)	Silver	60,000^{‡}
^{‡} Sales+streaming figures based on certification alone.

== Release history ==
Region	Date	Format(s)	Label	Ref.
Europe	2 June 2017	CD; cassette; digital download; vinyl	Infectious; Atlantic	
Japan	2 June 2017	CD; cassette; digital download; vinyl	Infectious	
United Kingdom	2 June 2017	CD; cassette; digital download; vinyl	Infectious	
United States	2 June 2017	CD; cassette; digital download; vinyl	Infectious; Atlantic	
