= The Canyon (Joe Newman album) =

Studio album by JJerome87
- Released: 10 December 2025
- Genre: Indie rock; alt-pop; art rock
- Length: 38:26
- Label: Mushroom Music; Virgin Music Group
- Producer: Carlos de la Garza

Singles from The Canyon
- 1. "Brush Me Like a Horse" Released: 30 January 2026; 2. "Track and Field" Released: 13 April 2026; 3. "Mr. Alligator" Released: 29 May 2026; 4. "Green Velvet" Released: 26 June 2026

The Canyon is the first studio album by JJerome87, the solo stage name for alt-J frontman Joe Newman. It was released exclusively through Newman's website on 10 December 2025, and was given a wider release to both physical formats and streaming services on 26 June 2026. Produced by Carlos de la Garza, it was released during a hiatus by alt-J following their 2022 album, The Dream.

== Background ==
Following the release and touring cycle for The Dream (2022), members of alt-J began pursuing individual projects during a hiatus from the band. During this period, vocalist and guitarist Joe Newman started work on material that would become The Canyon. According to press materials, Newman drew inspiration from Americana, Motown, and cinematic storytelling traditions while writing the album.

The album was recorded with producer Carlos de la Garza, who had previously worked with artists including Paramore and Best Coast. Several songs were described in promotional coverage as narrative-focused compositions centered on fictional characters and "cinematic vignettes".

Prior to the album's formal announcement, Newman quietly released music under the moniker "JJerome87", initially distributing material directly through his website rather than through major streaming platforms. In April 2026, Newman officially announced The Canyon through Mushroom Music and Virgin Music Group, accompanied by the release of the single "Track and Field".

== Track listing ==
The Canyon track listing
No.	Title	Length
1.	"Mr. Alligator"	4:25
2.	"Green Velvet"	3:28
3.	"Quaaludes"	3:39
4.	"Interlude"	0:37
5.	"Juicy"	3:30
6.	"Walkaway Music"	2:35
7.	"Brush Me Like a Horse"	3:24
8.	"Two Hearts"	4:29
9.	"Track and Field"	3:15
10.	"Last Man Alive"	3:46
11.	"Pennine"	5:18
Total length:		38:26
