= Left Hand Free =

Single by Alt-J

from the album This Is All Yours
- Released: 7 July 2014
- Recorded: 2014
- Genre: Indie rock; garage rock; blues rock; Southern rock
- Length: 2:53
- Label: Infectious
- Songwriter: Alt-J
- Producer: Charlie Andrew

Alt-J singles chronology
"Hunger of the Pine" (2014)	"Left Hand Free" (2014)	"Every Other Freckle" (2014)

"Left Hand Free" is a song by English indie rock band Alt-J. It was released as the second single from the band's second studio album This Is All Yours on 7 July 2014.

== Background and composition ==
With its Southern rock influences, "Left Hand Free" is atypical for an Alt-J song, with the band themselves describing it as "the least Alt-J song ever". The song, written by band members Joe Newman, Thom Green and Gus Unger-Hamilton "in about 20 minutes", was built around a riff that Newman would play during rehearsals and features an organ solo from Unger-Hamilton, while Green's performance on the song was deliberately performed "as clichéd as possible," with "none of [his] personality in it". Contrary to reports that the band wrote the song at the behest of their record company, Unger-Hamilton elaborated that the song was rather "the product of having fun one afternoon in the writers’ studio and enjoying [themselves]", which eventually ended up being the track that the band's American label responded most favorably to.

== Release ==
"Left Hand Free" was released digitally as the second single from This Is All Yours on 7 July 2014. In the United States, it entered modern rock radio on 15 July 2014 and subsequently peaked at number two on the Billboard Alternative Songs chart. The song also debuted and peaked at number 99 on the Billboard Hot 100, becoming their first entry on the chart and their most successful single in the country to date. On 27 October 2014, a remix by Lido was released as a single.

== Music video ==
The music video for "Left Hand Free" was directed by Ryan Staake and released on 7 August 2014. It depicts a group of American teenagers doing various activities of leisure, including drinking beer, setting off fireworks, driving, and swimming in the Guadalupe River. Reviewer Tim Brayton commented "Since we're never going to see a beer ad directed by David Gordon Green, this is the next best thing. The hook is unbelievably straightforward: 'in the summer, sexy young people like to have fun with their sexy young friends! Pick-up trucks and getting wet are often involved!'... Some of the shots are fun and relaxed; a surprising number feel worn out, like you will after you've gotten too much sun."

A second official video was also released, which features a group of young adults at a pool party. The party is guarded by bouncers armed with various guns. At the end of the video peoples faces begin to panic and a guard is shot. A helicopter hovers towards the ground and a shootout between the bouncers and the helicopter begins, causing a panic.

== Media usage ==
The song appears in the 2016 Marvel Studios film Captain America: Civil War, during the first appearance of Peter Parker / Spider-Man. It is also played during the final credits of the movie.

The song also became very popular when the TV series Outer Banks was released in 2020, where Left Hand Free was the song used in the pilot episode montage.

== Charts ==
=== Weekly charts ===
Chart (2014–2023)	Peak position
Australia (ARIA)	80
Belgium (Ultratip Bubbling Under Flanders)	83
Canada Hot 100 (Billboard)	68
Canada Rock (Billboard)	5
France (SNEP)	126
Hungary (Single Top 40)	5
Scottish Singles Sales (Official Charts)	92
UK Singles (Official Charts)	85
UK Indie (Official Charts)	7
US Billboard Hot 100	99
US Hot Rock & Alternative Songs (Billboard)	9
US Rock & Alternative Airplay (Billboard)	5

=== Year-end charts ===
Chart (2014)	Position
US Hot Rock Songs (Billboard)	34
US Rock Airplay (Billboard)	23
Chart (2015)	Position
US Hot Rock Songs (Billboard)	98

== Certifications ==
Certifications for "Left Hand Free"
Region	Certification	Certified units/sales
Australia (ARIA)	2× Platinum	140,000^{‡}
United Kingdom (BPI)	Platinum	600,000^{‡}
United States (RIAA)	Gold	500,000^{‡}
^{‡} Sales+streaming figures based on certification alone.

== Release history ==
Region	Date	Format	Label
United States	7 July 2014	Digital download	Canvasback Music, Atlantic Records
United Kingdom	8 July 2014	Digital download	Infectious Records
United States	15 July 2014	Modern rock radio	Canvasback Music, Atlantic Records
United States	15 September 2014	Adult album alternative radio	Canvasback Music, Atlantic Records
United States	27 October 2014	Digital download (Lido remix)	Infectious Records
