= Every Other Freckle =

Single by Alt-J

from the album This Is All Yours
- Released: 14 August 2014
- Recorded: 2014
- Genre: Indie rock; experimental rock; art rock; raga rock
- Length: 3:36
- Label: Infectious
- Songwriters: Joe Newman, Thom Green, Gus Unger-Hamilton
- Producer: Charlie Andrew

Alt-J singles chronology
"Left Hand Free" (2014)	"Every Other Freckle" (2014)	"3WW" (2017)

"Every Other Freckle" is a song by English indie rock band Alt-J. It was released as the third single from the band's second studio album This Is All Yours on 14 August 2014. Spin described it as "equal parts folk...Oompa Loompa anthem, and typical Alt-J sonic fuzziness..."

== Charts ==
=== Weekly charts ===
Chart (2014–15)	Peak position
Australia (ARIA)	73
Belgium (Ultratip Bubbling Under Flanders)	9
Belgium (Ultratip Bubbling Under Wallonia)	33
France (SNEP)	93
Netherlands (Single Top 100)	86
UK Singles (Official Charts)	58
UK Indie (Official Charts)	1
US Hot Rock & Alternative Songs (Billboard)	13
US Alternative Airplay (Billboard)	20
US Rock & Alternative Airplay (Billboard)	38

=== Year-end charts ===
Chart (2014)	Position
US Hot Rock Songs (Billboard)	85

== Certifications ==
Region	Certification	Certified units/sales
Australia (ARIA)	Gold	35,000^{‡}
United Kingdom (BPI)	Silver	200,000^{‡}
^{‡} Sales+streaming figures based on certification alone.

== Release history ==
Region	Date	Format	Label
United Kingdom	14 August 2014	Digital download	Infectious
United States	14 August 2014	Digital download	Canvasback Music, Atlantic
Italy	11 September 2014	Contemporary hit radio	Spin-Go!
United States	27 January 2015	Modern rock radio	Canvasback Music, Atlantic
