= High Anxiety (Thom Sonny Green album) =

Studio album by Thom Sonny Green
- Released: 19 August 2016
- Recorded: 2014–2016
- Genres: Electronica; ambient; experimental
- Length: 1:10:00
- Labels: Sudden Records; Infectious

Singles from High Anxiety
- 1. "Vienna" Released: 6 July 2016; 2. "Palms" Released: 15 July 2016; 3. "Phoenix" Released: 22 July 2016; 4. "Preach" Released: 29 July 2016; 5. "Oslo" Released: 5 August 2016; 6. "Blew" Released: 12 August 2016

High Anxiety is the debut solo album by British musician Thom Sonny Green. It was composed and recorded by Green from 2014 to 2016, while he was touring with Alt-J, and was released on 19 August 2016 by Infectious and Sudden Records. The album received mixed reviews by critics.

== Background and recording ==
Green started producing in 2012, using his laptop. He composed and recorded the album over the course of two years while touring with Alt-J, in hotel rooms. In the process, he used Ableton Live and a short music gear, including Bass Station II and OP-1 synthesisers, a H2n recorder, and a Game Boy.

== Music ==
High Anxiety is an electronica, ambient and experimental album. Green cited Clams Casino, Arca, Deftones and Radiohead as influences on the record. The title of the album refers to Green's "general anxiety".

== Critical reception ==
Professional ratings
Aggregate scores
Source	Rating
AnyDecentMusic?	5.8/10
Metacritic	57/100
Review scores
Source	Rating
Paste	7.7/10
The Observer	3/5 stars
NME	3/5 stars
PopMatters	4/10 stars

High Anxiety received mixed reviews by music critics, many of whom found the album overlong. At Metacritic, which assigns a normalised rating out of 100 to reviews from mainstream publications, it received an average score of 57, based on 7 reviews.

== Track listing ==
All tracks are written by Thom Sonny Green.

Digital download and CD
No.	Title	Length
1.	"Vienna"	3:12
2.	"40 Beers"	1:04
3.	"Market"	2:44
4.	"System"	4:08
5.	"Blew"	4:09
6.	"Arizona"	2:03
7.	"Oslo"	3:37
8.	"Ping"	2:38
9.	"Cologne"	2:23
10.	"Houston"	3:29
11.	"Oakland"	2:31
12.	"VVVV"	2:38
13.	"Phoenix"	3:08
14.	"Large"	4:39
15.	"Palms"	3:21
16.	"Beach"	2:41
17.	"Grounds"	2:43
18.	"Preach"	3:55
19.	"Christ"	4:16
20.	"Meh"	5:34
21.	"Neon Blue"	3:45
Total length:		1:10:00
