= 3WW =

Single by Alt-J

from the album Relaxer
- Released: 6 March 2017
- Genre: Folktronica; art pop
- Length: 5:00
- Label: Infectious; Atlantic
- Songwriters: Joe Newman; Gus Unger-Hamilton; Thom Sonny Green
- Producer: Charlie Andrew

Alt-J singles chronology
"Every Other Freckle" (2014)	"3WW" (2017)	"In Cold Blood" (2017)

"3WW" is a song by British indie rock band Alt-J. It is the opening track and first single from their third studio album, Relaxer, and was released as a digital single on 6 March 2017 by Infectious Music and Atlantic Records. The song was written by Joe Newman, Gus Unger-Hamilton, Thom Sonny Green and produced by Charlie Andrew. It features guest vocals from British musician Ellie Rowsell of Wolf Alice. The song's title is an abbreviation of "three worn words", a phrase which is sung in the song.

== Composition and lyrics ==
In an interview with NPR, the band said:

The first song, '3WW,' traces the adventures of a wayward lad during a night on England's northeast coast, culminating in the whispering of 'three worn words.' The chorus refers to the statue of Shakespeare's Juliet at the Casa di Giulietta in Verona, which has been damaged by excessive rubbing by the hands of visitors eager for good luck in love.

== Music video ==
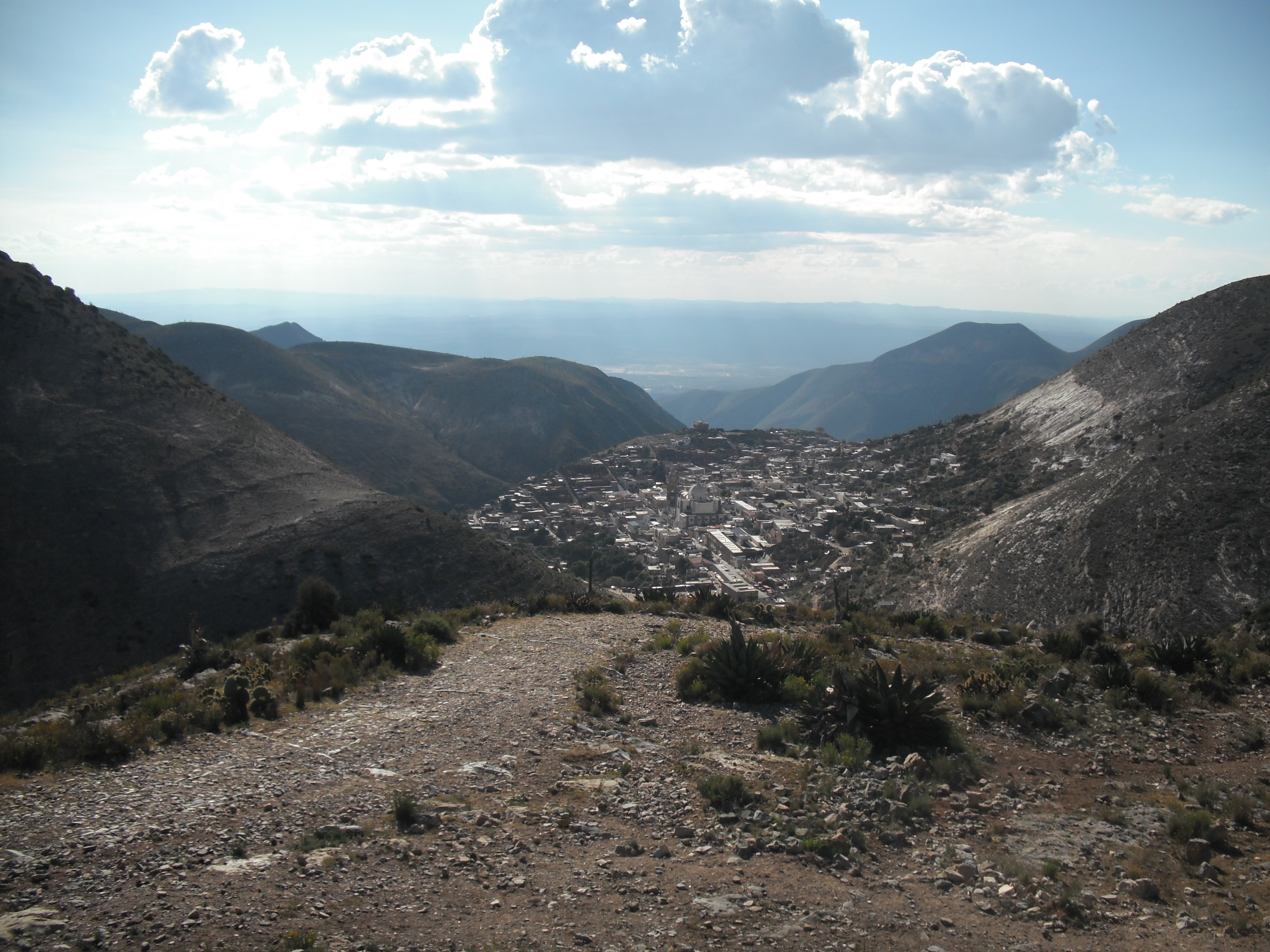
View of Real de Catorce

A music video was released a month after the song's release on 13 April 2017. It was directed by Alex Takacs (a.k.a. Young Replicant), who had previously directed videos for Lorde and Flying Lotus, and was produced by Pulse Films. The video, shot in black and white, depicts a funeral procession in the mountains of Mexico following the death of a young woman. The people of the town carry the coffin until the sun sets, upon which a man—the deceased woman's lover―is left alone in the mountains with a donkey to carry her coffin. The young man faces harsh weather and a violent encounter with a dog. The coffin is seen opened and the young woman pulls the young man's body away. She is later seen holding coins to the man's eyes, which were placed upon her own before the closing of her coffin, referencing Charon's obol and an old Catholic tradition symbolizing the young man's death. The video was filmed in Real de Catorce, Mexico. To prepare for the video's production, frontman Joe Newman sent the song to director Alex Takacs alongside a poem by English poet Ted Hughes. Takacs was inspired to film in Real de Catorce by mountain imagery in the photography of Mexican writer Juan Rulfo and Mexican cinematographer Gabriel Figueroa. The actors cast in the video were from Mexico City and also Real de Catorce.

== Performances ==
On 19 May 2017, Alt-J performed "3WW" on the sixth episode of the fiftieth series of Later... with Jools Holland. The band was accompanied by Ellie Rowsell, who sung the guest vocals on the song's studio recording.

== Critical reception ==
"3WW" received very favorable reviews from contemporary music critics. Daniel Kreps of Rolling Stone praised the song, calling it a "dexterous" track that "showcases how much Alt-J has matured musically since their debut five years ago and their ability to go platinum despite their non-traditional song structures." Christopher Hooton of The Independent gave "3WW" five out of five stars, calling the song "their most sensual yet." Alex Young of Consequence of Sound called it "an enthralling track that begins as a dreamy guitar instrumental and slowly builds to a loud, vibrant crescendo."

== Track listing ==
Digital download
No.	Title	Length
1.	"3WW"	5:00

== Personnel ==
Credits adapted from Tidal

=== Alt-J ===
- Joe Newman – guitar, vocals
- Gus Unger-Hamilton – keyboards, vocals
- Thom Sonny Green – drums, percussion, programming

=== Additional musicians ===
- Ellie Rowsell – guest vocals
- London Metropolitan Orchestra – strings

=== Technical ===
- Charlie Andrew – production, mixing, engineering, programming
- Brett Cox – engineering
- Jay Pocknell - engineering
- Stefano Civetta – assistant engineering
- Paul Pritchard – assistant engineering
- Graeme Baldwin – assistant engineering
- Dick Beetham – mastering

=== Artwork and design ===
- Osamu Sato

== Charts ==
Chart (2017)	Peak position
Belgium (Ultratip Bubbling Under Flanders)	20
UK Indie (OCC)	27
US Hot Rock & Alternative Songs (Billboard)	22
