= In Cold Blood (Alt-J song) =

Single by Alt-J

from the album Relaxer
- Released: 29 March 2017
- Genre: Indietronica; art pop; psychedelic rock; experimental rock
- Length: 3:26
- Label: Infectious; Atlantic
- Songwriters: Joe Newman; Gus Unger-Hamilton; Thom Sonny Green
- Producer: Charlie Andrew

Alt-J singles chronology
"3WW" (2017)	"In Cold Blood" (2017)	"Adeline" (2017)

"In Cold Blood" is a song by British indie rock band Alt-J. It is the second track and second single from their third studio album, Relaxer, and was released as a digital single on 29 March 2017 by Infectious Music and Atlantic Records. The song was written by Joe Newman, Gus Unger-Hamilton, and Thom Sonny Green and produced by Charlie Andrew. It features a brass section recorded at Abbey Road Studios in London and a Casiotone the band purchased for £1.05 on eBay. The song's title is a reference to the novel of the same name by American novelist Truman Capote. The song's composition dates back to when the band started during their studies at the University of Leeds.

== Composition and lyrics ==
In an interview with NPR, the band said:

This song was started when we were still students in Leeds, finally finished in the sessions for this album. Sometimes it happens that way. The title comes from the book of the same name by Truman Capote — however, this was mostly because it sounded good rather than due to the song being about mass murder. We recorded the brass section at Abbey Road Studios in North London, which was an amazing experience.

The song starts with the eight digit binary phrase: "zero one one one zero zero one one" (01110011), which is 163 (octal), 115 (decimal), and 73 (hex), which translates to a lowercase "s" under the ASCII system. It is unclear what this means, although the band labeled a teaser for the song "3WW" with the binary ASCII encoding "00110011 01110111 01110111".

== Music video ==
The music video for the song was released on 9 May 2017. It was directed by Casper Balslev, who had previously directed videos for Marina and the Diamonds and MØ. The video is narrated by Iggy Pop, frontman of The Stooges.

== Performances ==
On 18 April 2017, Alt-J performed "In Cold Blood" on the 656th episode of The Tonight Show Starring Jimmy Fallon. The band performed the song with a backing horn section and with Questlove, the drummer of Jimmy Fallon's house band the Roots. On 19 May 2017, Alt-J performed "In Cold Blood" on the sixth episode of the fiftieth series of Later... with Jools Holland. On 5 June 2017, Alt-J performed "In Cold Blood" on Conan.

The band also performed "In Cold Blood" for their second NPR tiny desk concert in an acoustic, string accompanied medley.

In Cold Blood is also the ending theme for the Netflix anime series Ingress.

The song soundtracked the YouTube video "VESPA Road Trip Corsica 2020 by SIP Scootershop".

== Critical reception ==
"In Cold Blood" received favorable reviews from contemporary music critics. Robin Murray of Clash called it "both straight-forwardly melodic and fascinatingly complex, the interweaving vocals underpinned by bleeping electronics and flashes of brass."

== Track listing ==
Digital download
No.	Title	Length
1.	"In Cold Blood"	3:26

== Personnel ==
Credits adapted from Tidal.

=== Alt-J ===
- Joe Newman – guitar, vocals, bass guitar
- Gus Unger-Hamilton – keyboards, vocals
- Thom Sonny Green – drums, percussion

=== Additional musicians ===
- Joe Auckland – trumpet
- Martin Williams – tenor saxophone
- Trevor Mires – trombone
- Mike Kearsey – trombone
- Adrien Hallowel – trombone

=== Technical ===
- Charlie Andrew – production, mixing, programming
- Brett Cox – engineering
- Jay Pocknell - engineering
- Stefano Civetta – assistant engineering
- Paul Pritchard – assistant engineering
- Graeme Baldwin – assistant engineering
- Dick Beetham – mastering

=== Artwork and design ===
- Osamu Sato

== Charts ==
=== Weekly charts ===
Chart (2017)	Peak position
Belgium (Ultratip Bubbling Under Flanders)	13
France (SNEP)	166
New Zealand Heatseekers (RMNZ)	10
UK Indie (OCC)	11
US Hot Rock & Alternative Songs (Billboard)	19
US Adult Alternative Airplay (Billboard)	9
US Alternative Airplay (Billboard)	13
US Rock & Alternative Airplay (Billboard)	21

=== Year-end charts ===
Chart (2017)	Position
US Hot Rock Songs (Billboard)	95
US Adult Alternative Songs (Billboard)	40
US Alternative Songs (Billboard)	49

== Certifications ==
Region	Certification	Certified units/sales
Australia (ARIA)	Gold	35,000^{‡}
^{‡} Sales+streaming figures based on certification alone.
