= Monster Florence =

UK hip-hop group

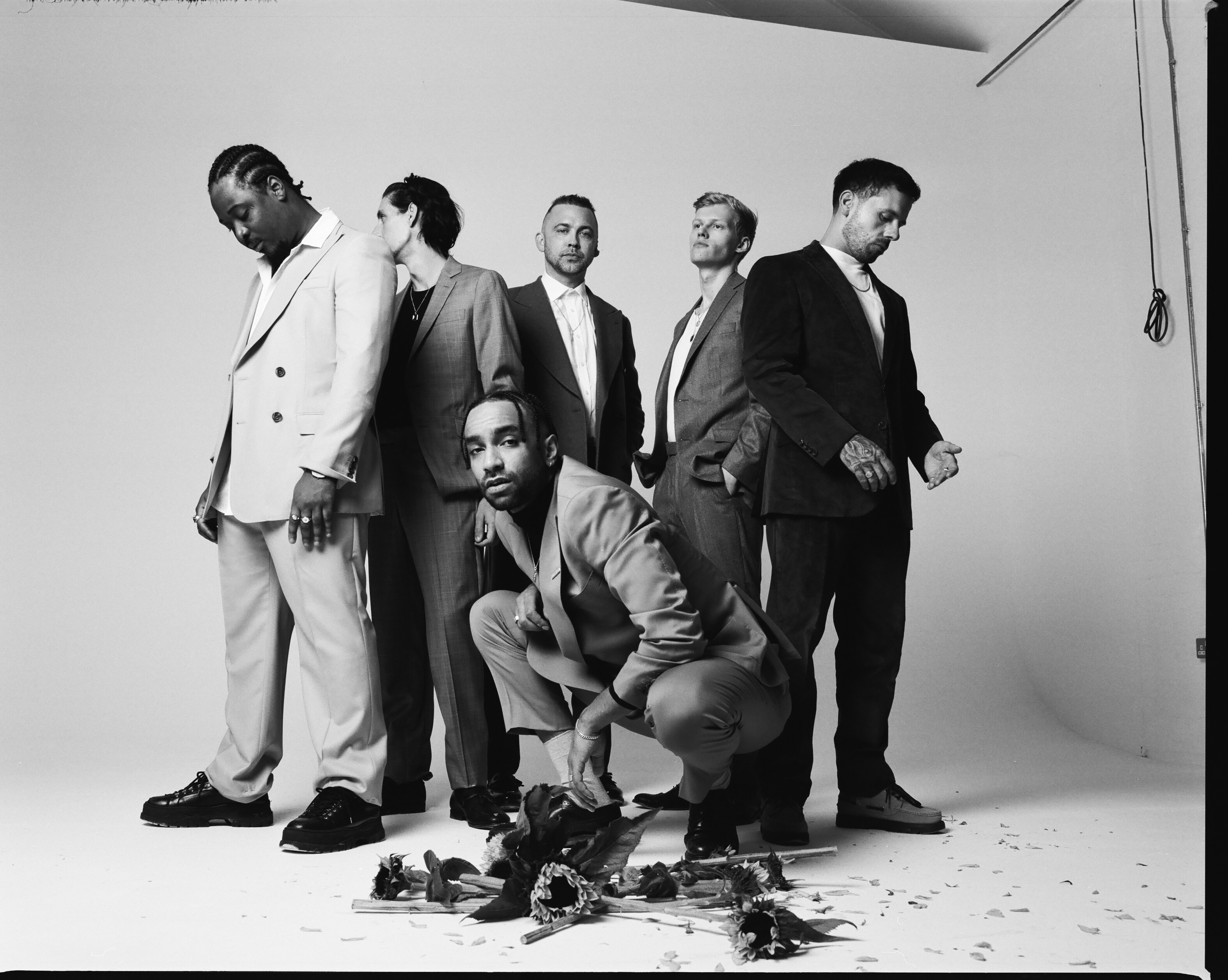
- Monster Florence

Background information
- Origin: Colchester, UK
- Genres: Hip hop, grime, punk
- Years active: 2014–present
- Labels: Project Melody; Goldbar Records
- Website: www.monsterflorence.com

Monster Florence is a British hip hop group from Colchester. The group is composed of six members: vocalists Dream Mclean, Alex Osiris and Wallace Rice, formerly known as Regime, and instrumentalists Tom Donovan, Jonny Poole and Cameron Morrell. The group formed after playing together for what was meant to be a one-off festival performance.

The group has released three albums, a string of EPs and singles and a recorded live session of their EP Cowboys & Idiots at Abbey Road Studios.

== Members ==
- Dream Mclean - vocals
- Alex Osiris - vocals
- Wallace Rice - vocals
- Tom Donovan - guitars, keys, programming and production
- Cameron Morrell - drums
- Jonny Poole - sax, keys and bass guitar

== Discography ==
=== Albums ===
- 48 (2017, Goldbar Records)
- Foul (2018, Goldbar Records)
- Cowboys & Idiots (2020, Project Melody)
- Cowboys & Idiots (Deluxe) (2020, Project Melody)
- Master System (2023, Project Melody)
- Petty Cash (2025, Project Melody)

=== Singles ===
- "I Love You All the Time" (2016, Goldbar Records)
- "The Groove" (2016, Goldbar Records)
- "Resourceful" (2016, Goldbar Records)
- "The Good, the Bad and the Ugly" (2016, Goldbar Records)
- "Bad Gear" (2016, Goldbar Records)
- "Sinister" (featuring Setra & S.Samuel) (2017, Goldbar Records)
- "Anne Boleyn" (2017, Goldbar Records)
- "Beg Friends" (2017, Goldbar Records)
- "Gwolla" (featuring S.Samuel) (2018, Goldbar Records)
- "Famous People Die the Most" (2018, Goldbar Records)
- "Look at the Strength" (2018, Goldbar Records)
- "Deck of Cards" (2018)

"Sell Me the World" (featuring Dame) (2019, Goldbar Records)

- "Peepin'" (2019, Goldbar Records)
- "Frida" (2019, Goldbar Records)
- "Thunderclouds" (featuring Miles Kane) (2019, Goldbar Records)
- "Break Something" (2019, Goldbar Records)
- "Fandino" (2019, Goldbar Records)
- "Picture Frame" (featuring Miles Kane) (2020, Project Melody)
- "26 Ghosts" (2020, Project Melody)
- "Walls of Jericho" (2020, Project Melody)
- "Relax" (featuring John Cooper Clarke) (2022, Project Melody)
- "Borstal" (2022, Project Melody)
- "PINKY" (2024, Project Melody)
