= This Is All Yours =

Studio album by Alt-J
- Released: 22 September 2014
- Recorded: 2014
- Studio: Iguana Studio (London, England)
- Genre: Folktronica; indie rock; art rock; indie pop
- Length: 64:35
- Label: Infectious
- Producer: Charlie Andrew

Alt-J chronology
| An Awesome Wave (2012) | This Is All Yours (2014) | Relaxer (2017) |

Singles from This Is All Yours
- 1. "Hunger of the Pine" Released: 19 June 2014; 2. "Left Hand Free" Released: 7 July 2014; 3. "Every Other Freckle" Released: 13 August 2014; 4. "Warm Foothills" Released: 2 March 2015

This Is All Yours is the second album by English indie rock band Alt-J, released on 22 September 2014 through Infectious. It was promoted with four singles: "Hunger of the Pine", "Left Hand Free", "Every Other Freckle", and "Warm Foothills". It debuted at number one on the UK Albums Chart, becoming the group's first number one album, and reached number two in Belgium, Australia, and Canada, and number four in the United States. It was nominated for the Grammy Award for Best Alternative Music Album at the 57th Grammy Awards.

== Background and recording ==
In May 2012, Alt-J released their debut album An Awesome Wave, which won the Mercury Prize for that year. Alt-J were also nominated for three Brit Awards (British Breakthrough Act, British Album of the Year and British Group of the Year). Bassist Gwil Sainsbury left the band in January 2014. The band began recording the album in April 2014. It was recorded in the same place as An Awesome Wave, Iguana Studios, which Gus Unger-Hamilton described as "a tiny little place, sort of behind a second hand tyre shop".

== Music ==
The majority of the songs on the album were written while touring their debut album, An Awesome Wave, while newer ones such as "Hunger of the Pine" were written in "a really cool little converted Warehouse in Hackney, very cliché East London". Unger-Hamilton said that the "song cycle" of the album is made up of "Arrival in Nara", "Nara" and "Leaving Nara", Nara being a city in Japan. "Hunger of the Pine" was one of the songs written after their bass player Gwil Sainsbury left in January 2014. The song features a sample of "4x4" by Miley Cyrus, of her singing "I'm a female rebel". The sample originally came from a remix Thom Green, Alt-J's drummer, made for Miley Cyrus. Joe Newman said "I was playing the guitar and Thom was responding to what I was doing on Ableton and before we knew it, we'd come up with this really interesting structure, and I came up with lyrics for it quite quickly." Gus Unger-Hamilton said "it sounded cool with what Joe was playing on the guitar." The band asked Miley Cyrus if they could use the sample; according to Newman, she was "cool with it". He said that Miley Cyrus has "been really supportive of us, and she's a fan, I think, which is really nice."

== Release ==
On 9 June 2014, the band announced the release of their second album This Is All Yours, as well as putting pre-orders for the album on their website. The album was released on September 22, 2014, as a download, on CD and double vinyl. On 13 June, Alt-J posted a video on their Instagram account featuring a clip of the first single "Hunger of the Pine". The single premiered on Zane Lowe's show on BBC Radio 1 on 18 June. The song was streamed later that day, and released as a single on the iTunes Store the next. "Left Hand Free" was released digitally on 7 July 2014 as the album's second single and impacted modern rock radio on 15 July 2014.

On 13 August 2014, the album's third single, "Every Other Freckle", premiered on Zane Lowe's BBC Radio 1 show once again.

On 9 September 2014, the band released an app that gave access to the album when the user was in select locations.

On 15 September 2014, the band made the album available to listen to on music-streaming platform Spotify.

On 2 March 2015, the band released "Warm Foothills" as the fourth and final single from the album.

== Critical reception ==
Professional ratings
Aggregate scores
| Source | Rating |
|---|---|
| AnyDecentMusic? | 7.1/10 |
| Metacritic | 70/100 |
Review scores
| Source | Rating |
| AllMusic | 4/5 stars |
| The Daily Telegraph | 4/5 stars |
| Entertainment Weekly | B− |
| The Guardian | 4/5 stars |
| Mojo | 4/5 stars |
| NME | 8/10 |
| Pitchfork | 4.0/10 |
| Q | 4/5 stars |
| Rolling Stone | 4/5 stars |
| Uncut | 5/10 |

Upon its release, This Is All Yours received generally positive reviews from music critics. At Metacritic, which assigns a normalized rating out of 100 to reviews from mainstream critics, the album received an average score of 70, based on 26 reviews, indicating "generally favorable reviews".

=== Accolades ===
The album was nominated at the 57th Grammy Awards for Best Alternative Music Album, and for IMPALA's European Independent Album of the Year Award.

== Commercial performance ==
This Is All Yours debuted at number one on the UK's Official Albums Chart on 28 September 2014. In Canada, the album debuted at number two on the Canadian Albums Chart, selling 14,000 copies in its first week. The album fell behind Leonard Cohen's Popular Problems.

== Track listing ==
All tracks are written by Joe Newman, Gus Unger-Hamilton, and Thom Sonny Green, except where noted.

This Is All Yours track listing
| No. | Title | Length |
|---|---|---|
| 1. | "Intro" | 4:38 |
| 2. | "Arrival in Nara" | 4:13 |
| 3. | "Nara" | 4:58 |
| 4. | "Every Other Freckle" | 3:36 |
| 5. | "Left Hand Free" | 2:53 |
| 6. | "❦" (Garden of England) | 1:07 |
| 7. | "Choice Kingdom" | 4:17 |
| 8. | "Hunger of the Pine" | 4:59 |
| 9. | "Warm Foothills" | 3:45 |
| 10. | "The Gospel of John Hurt" | 5:15 |
| 11. | "Pusher" | 3:26 |
| 12. | "Bloodflood Pt. II" | 5:19 |
| 13. | "Leaving Nara" (ends at 2:00; hidden track "Lovely Day" (Bill Withers, Skip Scarborough) starts at 12:00) | 16:02 |
| Total length: | | 64:35 |

== Personnel ==
Adapted from LP liner notes.

Alt-J

- Joe Newman – guitar, bass, lead vocals
- Thom Green – drums
- Gus Unger-Hamilton – keyboards, backing vocals

Additional musicians

- Kirsty Mangan – strings
- Tim Rundle – penny whistle, recorder

Technical

- Charlie Andrew – production
- Brett Cox – engineering, guitar (10)
- Dick Beetham – mastering
- RCA – mastering

== Chart performance ==
=== Weekly charts ===
| Chart (2014) | Peak position |
|---|---|
| Australian Albums (ARIA) | 2 |
| Austrian Albums (Ö3 Austria) | 7 |
| Belgian Albums (Ultratop Flanders) | 2 |
| Belgian Albums (Ultratop Wallonia) | 7 |
| Canadian Albums (Billboard) | 2 |
| Danish Albums (Hitlisten) | 7 |
| Dutch Albums (Album Top 100) | 6 |
| French Albums (SNEP) | 5 |
| German Albums (Offizielle Top 100) | 8 |
| Hungarian Albums (MAHASZ) | 28 |
| Irish Albums (IRMA) | 4 |
| Italian Albums (FIMI) | 24 |
| New Zealand Albums (RMNZ) | 5 |
| Norwegian Albums (VG-lista) | 13 |
| Scottish Albums (Official Charts) | 4 |
| Swedish Albums (Sverigetopplistan) | 55 |
| Swiss Albums (Schweizer Hitparade) | 3 |
| UK Albums (Official Charts) | 1 |
| UK Album Downloads (Official Charts) | 1 |
| UK Independent Albums (Official Charts) | 1 |
| US Billboard 200 | 4 |
| US Top Alternative Albums (Billboard) | 1 |
| US Top Rock Albums (Billboard) | 1 |

=== Year-end charts ===
| Chart (2014) | Position |
|---|---|
| Australian Albums (ARIA) | 56 |
| Belgian Albums (Ultratop Flanders) | 37 |
| Belgian Albums (Ultratop Wallonia) | 119 |
| French Albums (SNEP) | 145 |
| UK Albums (OCC) | 89 |
| US Billboard 200 | 168 |
| US Top Alternative Albums (Billboard) | 21 |
| US Top Rock Albums (Billboard) | 33 |

| Chart (2015) | Position |
|---|---|
| Belgian Albums (Ultratop Flanders) | 55 |
| US Top Rock Albums (Billboard) | 45 |

== Certifications ==
| Region | Certification | Certified units/sales |
|---|---|---|
| Australia (ARIA) | Gold | 35,000^{^} |
| Canada (Music Canada) | Gold | 40,000^{^} |
| Netherlands (NVPI) | Gold | 25,000^{^} |
| United Kingdom (BPI) | Gold | 160,932 |
| United States (RIAA) | Gold | 500,000^{‡} |
^{^} Shipments figures based on certification alone.^{‡} Sales+streaming figures based on certification alone.
