= London Metropolitan Orchestra =

Studio orchestra

London Metropolitan Orchestra (LMO) is a studio orchestra in London, specialising in recording of film scores. Since its foundation in 1994, its leader is the conductor Andy Brown. The orchestra worked for British and American film and TV companies, e.g. BBC, ITV, Walt Disney Studios.

Among the soundtracks the orchestra recorded were the Oscar-nominated films Don Juan DeMarco (1994) und Mr. Holland's Opus (1995), with music by Michael Kamen. Other film composers they recorded include Klaus Badelt, Danny Elfman, Elliot Goldenthal, Mark Isham, Harald Kloser, David Newman, Barrington Pheloung, Basil Poledouris, Ed Shearmur, Howard Shore, Vangelis und Christopher Young, James Seymour Brett, Normand Corbeil, Ilan Eshkeri, Atli Örvarsson, Antônio Pinto, Michael Price, Frank Ilfman.

In January 2021, the orchestra appointed Daisy Chute as the chorus mistress for their London Metropolitan Chorus.

== Selected recordings ==
- 1998: Ed Shearmur: The Wings of the Dove
- 2000: Barrington Pheloung: The Magic of Inspector Morse
- 2001: Vangelis: Mythodea – Music for the NASA Mission: 2001 Mars Odyssey
- 2003: Michael Kamen: Band of Brothers
- 2007: Ilan Eshkeri: Stardust
- 2008: Barrington Pheloung: Lewis. Music from the Series
- 2008: The Crimson Wing: Mystery of the Flamingos (The Cinematic Orchestra and London Metropolitan Orchestra)
- 2012: Phamie Gow, album The Angels Share (Pipes and drums of the Royal Scots Dragoon Guards and London Metropolitan Orchestra
- 2014: Ilan Eshkeri: Still Alice
- 2015: Ilan Eshkeri: Shaun the Sheep Movie
- 2026: Natalie Holt: Shaun the Sheep: The Beast of Mossy Bottom
