= Alt-J =

English indie rock band

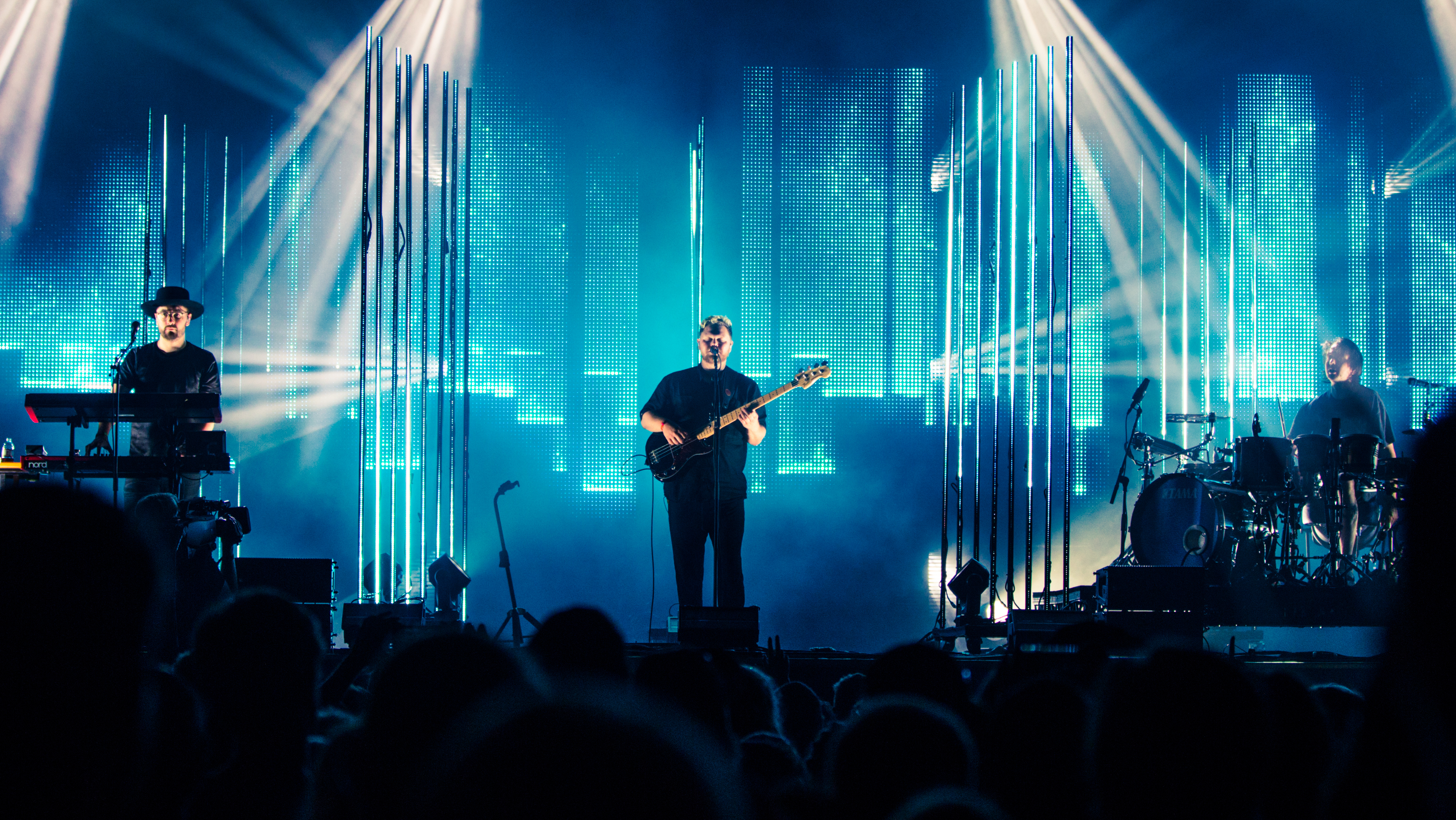
- Alt-J performing at the 2018 Bonnaroo Music And Arts Festival

Background information
- Also known as: ∆
- Origin: Leeds, West Yorkshire, England
- Genres: Indie rock; indie pop; art rock; folktronica
- Years active: 2007–present
- Labels: Loud and Quiet; Infectious; Atlantic; Canvasback
- Members: Joe Newman; Thom Sonny Green; Gus Unger-Hamilton
- Past members: Gwil Sainsbury
- Website: altjband.com

Alt-J (stylised as alt-J or Δ) are an English indie rock band formed in 2007 in Leeds. Their lineup includes Joe Newman (guitar/bass/lead vocals), Thom Sonny Green (drums), Gus Unger-Hamilton (keyboards/vocals), and formerly Gwil Sainsbury (guitar/bass).

Their debut album An Awesome Wave was released in May 2012 in Europe, and in September 2012 in the United States, and won the 2012 British Mercury Prize. Sainsbury left the band in early 2014. Their second album, This Is All Yours, was released on 22 September 2014 and went straight to number one in the United Kingdom. In June 2017 the band released their third studio album Relaxer, followed in February 2022 by their fourth studio album The Dream.

== Name ==
Alt-J started with the name "Daljit Dhaliwal", after the BBC newsreader and television presenter, who the band grew up watching in the 90s. The band then renamed itself to "FILMS", but were later forced to change their name because an American band called "The Films" already existed.

The band's "actual" name is the triangle-shaped symbol ∆, the capital Greek letter delta which is used in mathematics for the difference operator to denote "change". On Mac computers, that symbol can be typed by pressing the keys Alt-J, hence the name Alt-J.

Then-member Gwil Sainsbury explained this by relating the meaning of "change" to the renaming happening "at a turning point in their lives."

The band often makes references to triangles.. The song "Tesselate" mentions "triangles are my favourite shape", and they make triangle symbols with their fingers during concerts), which they say is just due to it being a visually appealing shape.

The cover art of the band's debut album An Awesome Wave shows an overhead view of the Ganges Delta, in reference to the Alt-J's "delta" name.

== History ==
=== 2007–2010: Formation and early years ===
Alt-J (∆) were formed when Gwilym (Gwil) Sainsbury (guitar/bass), Joe Newman (guitar/lead vocals), Augustus (Gus) Unger-Hamilton (keyboards/vocals) and Thomas Stuart (Thom Sonny) Green (drums) met at University of Leeds in 2007. Unger-Hamilton (younger brother of Ferdy, head of A&R for Polydor Records) studied English, the other three Fine Art. According to Newman, "I basically went to art school to start a band."

In their second year of studies, Newman showed Sainsbury some of his own songs and the pair began recording on GarageBand in their hall rooms with Sainsbury acting as producer. The band's sound arose in part from living in student accommodation, where noise had to be kept to a minimum, as well as limited access to instruments. At the time, Green used a very limited drum kit, Unger-Hamilton a cheap keyboard, and Newman an acoustic guitar.

=== 2011–2012: An Awesome Wave and touring ===
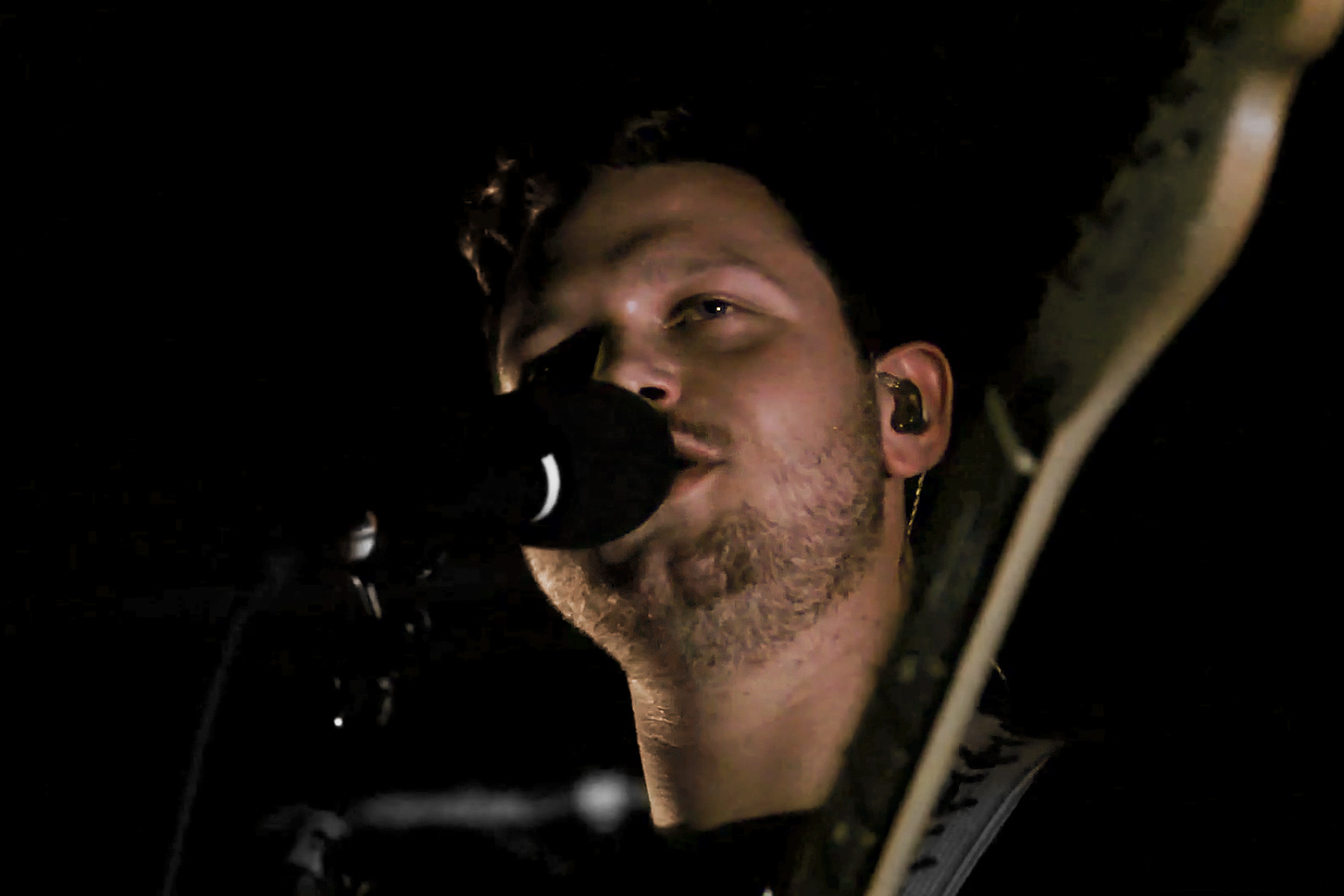
Joe Newman with Alt-J at The Empty Bottle, Chicago, in October 2012

After graduating, the band moved to Cambridge where they spent several months working on their music before signing a deal with Infectious Music in December 2011. Their self-titled 4-track demo EP, ∆, was recorded with producer Charlie Andrew in London and featured the tracks "Breezeblocks", "Hand-Made", "Matilda", and "Tessellate". A 7" single containing "Bloodflood" and "Tessellate" was released by Loud and Quiet in October 2011. Their first 2012 release for Infectious Music was the triangle-shaped 10" "Matilda" / "Fitzpleasure". It was followed by "Breezeblocks" which preceded their first album. An Awesome Wave was also produced by Charlie Andrew and compiled at Iguana Studios, Brixton, where the band recorded tracks during the studio's spare time.

Andrew said that the band's sound was heavily influenced by unusual instrument choices, including drummer Thom Green's decision not to use cymbals. Andrew told Sound on Sound, "The only slightly cymbal-like thing he uses is the back end of a saucepan, which he uses for the hi-hat". The album's drums were recorded first, followed by bass guitar and other instruments. Green's drumming was always recorded to a click track because Andrew wanted it to have the precision of electronic drums.

Their debut album was released on 28 May 2012 in the UK, Europe, and Australia, and on 18 September 2012 in North America via Canvasback Music. The album received some favourable reviews and was described as a "captivating blend of insatiable grooves and profound poignancy".

Alt-J supported Wild Beasts in April 2012 and played a minor headlining tour around the United Kingdom and Ireland in October of that year. The band have featured regularly on summer festivals, including Latitude, Bestival, Reading and Leeds, T in the Park, Green Man, Pukkelpop, and Lowlands. They also did concert tour in the United States in December 2012 and performed at the Laneway Festival tour in Australia. In November 2012 the band were announced as the winners of the Mercury Prize for their album. Besides the prize-money, the band saw an increase in their profile resulting in An Awesome Wave reaching number 13 on the UK Albums Chart. The band would later describe the event as "life-changing, there was a sense of [being] imposters, that the band had somehow got this far without not being a real band, we're just guys from Leeds who muddled through it and magicked a Mercury award".

The title "An Awesome Wave" was taken from the 1991 Bret Easton Ellis novel American Psycho.

=== 2013–2016: Departure of Sainsbury and This Is All Yours ===
On 11 January 2014, the band announced that Sainsbury had decided to leave the group, and that they remained friends. In early June 2014, Alt-J announced a 2014 tour to take place in North America over October and November. The 23-day tour started in Vancouver, B.C., on 14 October and ended in Washington, D.C., on 19 November. On 9 June 2014, they announced their second album This Is All Yours, that was released on 22 September 2014. This Is All Yours went straight to number 1 on the UK's Official Albums Chart. Alt-J headlined the September 2015 edition of Boston Calling Music Festival. As a replacement for Sainsbury, Cameron Knight became a supporting member for Alt-J's live shows.

=== 2017–2020: Relaxer ===
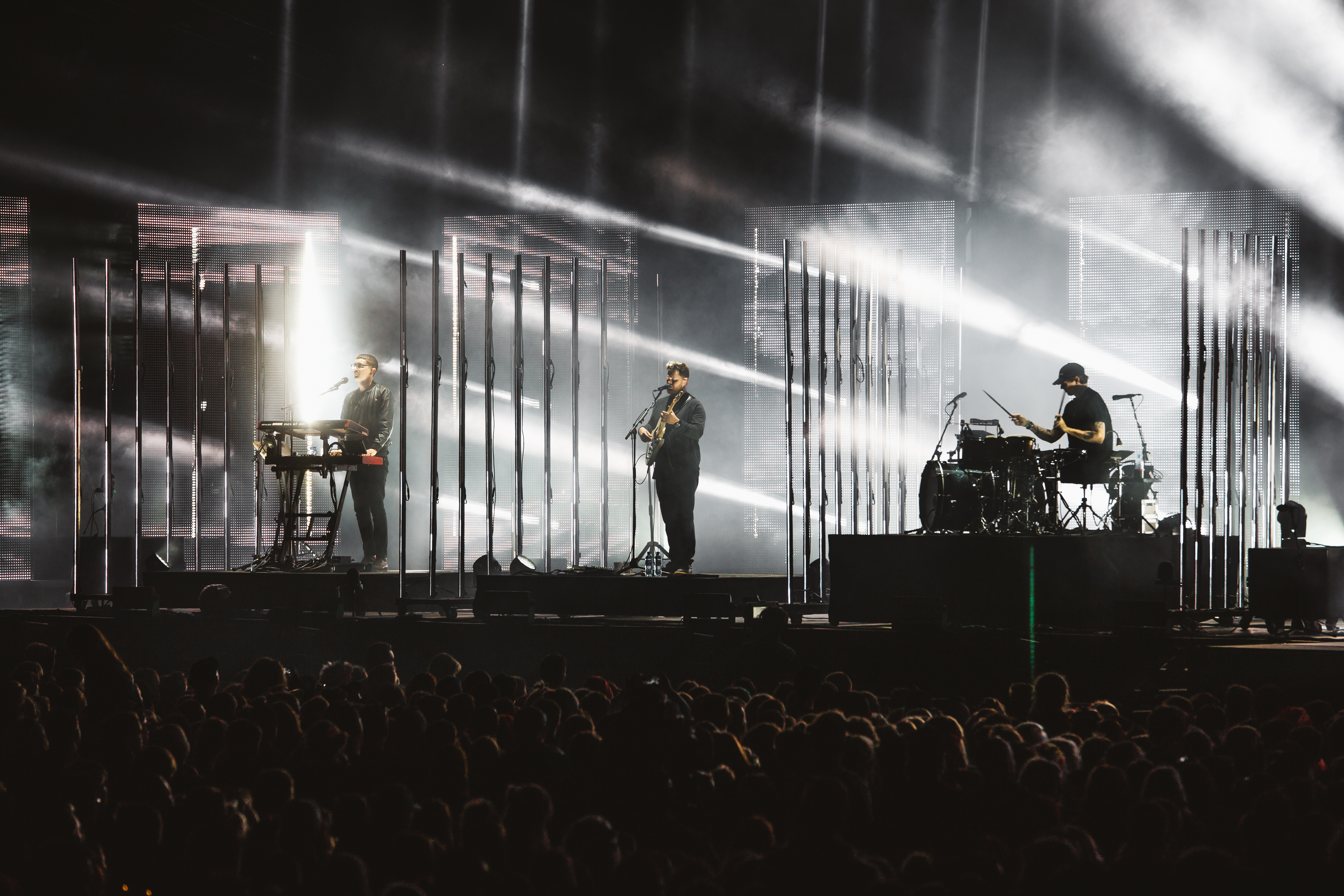
Alt-J performing at the Positivus Festival 2017 during the Relaxer Tour

On 3 March 2017 Alt-J began teasing their third studio album on their social media accounts with an audio clip captioned "00110011 01110111 01110111" (Binary code for "3ww"). Stereogum reported later that day that the band's third album would be titled Relaxer and was scheduled for release on 2 June 2017. On 6 March 2017 Alt-J released "3WW", which features lead singer Ellie Rowsell of Wolf Alice, as a digital single and announced dates for the Relaxer Tour in support of the album. Three weeks later, on 29 March, they released "In Cold Blood", the second single from Relaxer. In anticipation of their third album, the band released an online video game, whose soundtrack was their single "3WW," as well as announcing in May 2017 that they would be playing a five-date UK tour at seaside venues, starting on 4 September 2017.

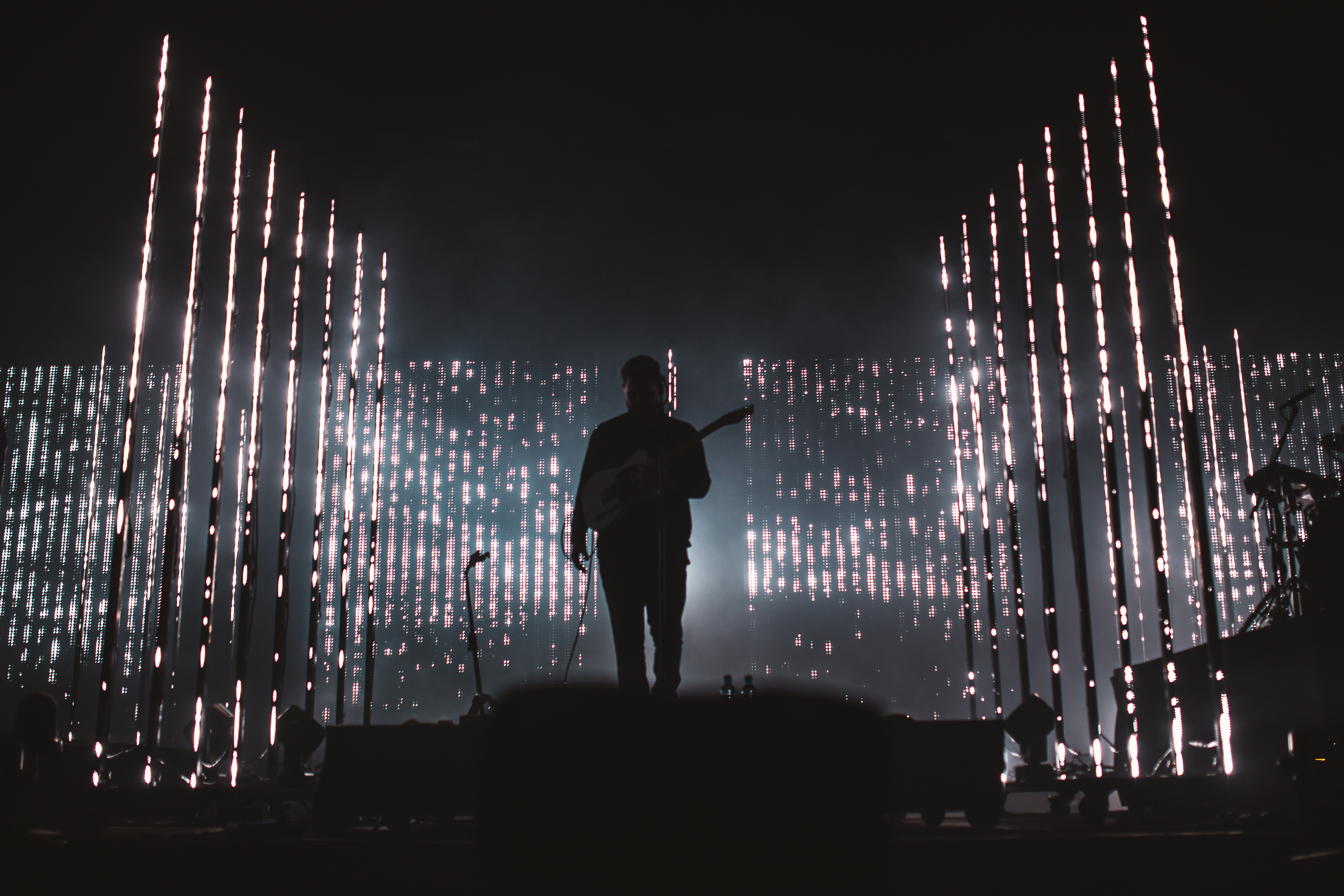
Alt-J performing during the Relaxer Tour, at Positivus Festival 2017 in Zvejnieku Parks, Salacgrīva, Latvia.

On 24 May 2017 Alt-J released "Adeline", the third single from Relaxer. The album was released shortly afterwards, on 2 June 2017. "Deadcrush", the fourth single from the album, was released on 12 July and was featured as a soundtrack in the FIFA 18 game. Fifth single "Pleader" arrived on 15 September 2017. Several tracks from Relaxer have since been remixed by a diverse array of artists.

Relaxer was nominated for the 2017 Mercury Prize.

On 28 September 2018 an alternative version of Relaxer was released. The album, titled Reduxer, is a "rap heavy do-over" of the previous year's record.

=== Since 2021: The Dream ===
On 16 September 2021, the band announced their first single since 2018, titled "U&ME", would be released 22 September 2021. The single's release coincided with the announcement of their fourth album, The Dream, which was released 11 February 2022.

== In popular culture ==
On 7 August 2008, "Fitzpleasure" was featured in the closing credits of Weeds, episode 6, season 8.

Alt-J performed "Buffalo" along with Mountain Man for the 2011 film Silver Linings Playbook.

In February 2013 the band announced they would be composing the soundtrack for Toby Jones' new film Leave to Remain.

Their song "Every Other Freckle" was featured on the Netflix show Lovesick, in the season 1 episode "Cressida", in 2014.

In 2014, their song "Tessellate" was featured on Sons of Anarchy, episode 5, season 6.

The song "Hunger of the Pine" is used to begin and end the first season of Unreal released in 2015.

In 2015, their song "Something Good" was featured in the second episode of Life Is Strange.

"Fitzpleasure" was featured in the background of the 2015 film Sisters and in the main trailer for the video game Battleborn released in 2016.

In 2016, their song "Left Hand Free" was featured in the Marvel Cinematic Universe film Captain America: Civil War.

In 2017, their song "Deadcrush" was featured in the soundtrack for FIFA 18.

In 2018, their songs "Tessellate" and "In Cold Blood" are the opening and ending respectively of the anime Ingress, based on the AR game created for Niantic: Ingress.

In 2019, their songs "Breezeblocks" and "In Cold Blood" were featured on the Netflix series Daybreak, episodes 5 and 10 respectively.

In 2020, their song "Left Hand Free" was featured in the Netflix series Outer Banks.

Also in 2020, "In Cold Blood" was in the Netflix film, Extraction.

In 2022, their song "Breezeblocks" was featured in the pilot episode, "Lightning Strikes", of Hulu series Tell Me Lies.

In 2023, a portion of their song "Hunger of the Pine" was featured in the announcement trailer for Hello Games's video game Light No Fire.

In December 2023, an instrumental version of their song "Adeline" was featured in the trailer for the Netflix film Society of the Snow.

On May 27, 2026, their song "Hunger of the Pine" was featured in the episode "Secateurs" of The Testaments.

== Lyrics ==
Alt-J has been noted for their post-modern lyrics in their songs that highlight historic events and pop-culture subjects. The song "Taro" is written in reference to Gerda Taro and her role as a war photographer during the Spanish Civil War as well as her relationship to Robert Capa. The song describes the details of Capa's death ("A violent wrench grips mass / Rips light, tears limbs like rags") and imagines Taro's complementary emotions. The visuals in a fan made music video by YouTube user David Dean Burkhart are taken from Godfrey Reggio's experimental film Powaqqatsi.

"Matilda" is a reference to Natalie Portman's character in the film Léon: The Professional. "Fitzpleasure" is the retelling of Hubert Selby Jr.'s short story "Tralala", published in Last Exit to Brooklyn. The story follows a prostitute named Tralala who dies after being gang-raped and raped with a broom, as in the lyrics "dead in the middle / of a c-o-double-m-o-n" and "in your snatch fits pleasure / broom shaped pleasure."

== Awards and nominations ==
In 2012, Alt-J's debut album won the British Mercury Prize. Alt-J were also nominated for three Brit Awards (British Breakthrough Act, British Album of the Year and British Group of the Year). An Awesome Wave was announced as BBC Radio 6 Music Album of the Year 2012. Three of the tracks from this album gained entry into the Australian 2012 Triple J Hottest 100, with "Something Good" at number 81, "Tessellate" at number 64, and "Breezeblocks" coming third overall. In 2013, An Awesome Wave won Album of the year at the Ivor Novello Awards. This Is All Yours received a Grammy Award nomination for Best Alternative Music Album at the 57th Annual Grammy Awards, and for IMPALA's European Independent Album of the Year Award.

== Personnel ==
Current

- Joe Newman – lead vocals, guitars, bass (2007–present)
- Thom Sonny Green – drums, percussion (2007–present)
- Gus Unger-Hamilton – keyboards, bass, vocals (2007–present)

Touring

- Cameron Knight – guitars, bass, sampler (2014–2016)

Past

- Gwil Sainsbury – guitars, bass (2007–2014)

=== Side projects ===
Green has also worked as an electronic music producer and solo artist. In 2026, Newman announced his solo project under the alias JJerome87.

== Discography ==
Studio albums

- An Awesome Wave (2012)
- This Is All Yours (2014)
- Relaxer (2017)
- The Dream (2022)
