= Charlie Andrew =

- Origin: Kent, England
- Genres: Rock, pop
- Occupations: Record producer, songwriter, festival director, drummer
- Years active: 2004–present

Charles Andrew is a British record producer, mixer and songwriter. He is best known for his work with indie band Alt-J.

In 2013 he was awarded 'Breakthrough Producer of the Year' by his peers at Music Producers Guild awards, in 2016 he won the 'Producer of the Year award' and in turn was awarded the Brit Award for 'British Producer of the Year'. He was included in the 2017 Debrett's 500.

In 2016, Andrew announced the launch of his new record label and publishing ventures Square Leg Records & Big Tree Music with Swedish band Francobollo the first signing to both companies, in 2017 he signed singer-songwriter Sivu.

Andrew also plays drums in the Laurel Collective and is part of the In the Woods Festival team.

== Early career ==
Andrew was educated at Bethany School, Goudhurst, Kent and studied at the University of Surrey for the Tonmeister degree, whilst living with two full on gauntlet legends. He also became an assistant at Abbey Road Studios. While at Abbey Road he worked on numerous projects including The Wall (Roger Waters Live In Berlin) and several film scores such as Gangs of New York, Harry Potter & the Chamber of Secrets and The Lord of the Rings trilogy.

He then formed the band the Laurel Collective and left Abbey Road to pursue his career as a drummer and producer.

== Laurel Collective and In The Woods ==
Andrew formed the Laurel Collective with friends in the mid-2000s and the band signed to Domino Recording Company sister publishing label, Double Six, releasing several singles and a mini album Feel Good Hits of a Nuclear Winter in 2008. The band followed up their mini-album with debut album Heartbeat Underground on Tape Club Records (Believe Recordings).

During this time, he and the fellow Laurel Collective members set up the In The Woods Festival, starting with 70 people and showcasing fellow up and coming bands and artists. The festival has continued with a fixed 1000 capacity.

== Production ==
Andrew made his production debut working alongside Clive Langer on Eugene McGuinness' 3rd album The Invitation to the Voyage. While producing this album, which was recorded over a couple of years, Charlie began working with Madness and ended up with several production credits on their album Oui Oui, Si Si, Ja Ja, Da Da, which reached the UK top 10 in the album charts and has been certified gold in the UK.

During this time, Andrew began producing a then-unsigned band who would become Alt-J. He produced their debut album An Awesome Wave which peaked at 13 in the UK charts, won the Barclaycard Mercury Prize, was certified platinum in the UK and gold in Australia.

In 2013, Andrew was nominated as Breakthrough Producer at the Music Producers Guild awards. He was presented as the winner of the award by Clive Langer on 7 February 2013. Later that year he co-produced the Resolution EP for Matt Corby, the title track would go on to win an ARIA Award for best song and has been certified 3× platinum in Australia.

In 2014, produced the second Alt-J album titled This Is All Yours, which gave Charlie and the band their first number one album.

In 2015 following his work with Alt-J, Marika Hackman and Sivu, it was announced he was nominated alongside Mark Ronson, Mike Crossey and Tom Dalgety as UK Producer of the Year. He was announced as the winner at the MPG Awards on 3 February 2016 at Grovesnor House.

Andrew has since worked on releases with Bloc Party, Darwin Deez, Matt Corby, Nick Mulvey, Rae Morris, We Were Evergreen, Sivu, Marika Hackman, Benjamin Francis Leftwich, Money, Belle Mt., Sorry (band), George Crosby, James (band), Madness (band), Crystal Fighters and number 1 albums with Wolf Alice and London Grammar.

Andrew was included in the 2017 Debrett's 500.

In 2022 he was again nominated for an MPG award for Vocal Producer of the Year.

Andrew co-produced David Gilmour's 2024 album Luck and Strange.
