= Infectious Music =

Record label

- Parent company: BMG Rights Management
- Founder: Korda Marshall
- Distributors: Universal Music Group (physical); BMG Rights Management (digital)
- Country of origin: United Kingdom
- Location: London
- Official website: infectiousmusicuk.com

Infectious Music is an independent record label owned by BMG, whose bands have included Alt-J, Ash and the Subways.

== History ==
Infectious Music was established in 1993 as Infectious Records by former Zerra One drummer Korda Marshall after leaving Bertelsmann (BMG-Ariola, the original major label BMG company), where he was the A&R manager of RCA Records and was involved with the running of Dave Stewart's AnXious label. Marshall left BMG as one of the acts he had co-signed, Take That, were not getting enough of a return on BMG's investment in the early 1990s (this being the time before they had released "Pray)" with Marshall going on to launch Infectious on 27 April 1993. The first band signed to Infectious was PWEI, who had followed Marshall from RCA Records/BMG (BMG-Ariola) where they had released a number of albums such as This Is the Day, This Is the Hour, This Is This! and The Pop Will Eat Itself Cure for Sanity.

Infectious Records became part of Michael Gudinski's Mushroom Records (now A&E Records) operation in the mid-1990s, when the Australian businessman wanted to expand his record company internationally and decided to buy half of Infectious. Marshall became the Managing Director of Mushroom Records (UK) Ltd, with his Infectious Records label being merged into the new British operation. Whilst at Mushroom Records UK, Marshall was responsible for signing Muse and Paul Oakenfold (with Perfecto Records) to the company.

In 1998, Infectious Records came under the full control of News Corporation, when Gudinski sold the rest of the company's shares to James Murdoch. After a planned management buyout failed, a deal was made with Roger Ames at Warner Music (WMG) to buy Mushroom Records UK, with the UK company becoming A&E Records and the Australian label becoming Festival Mushroom Records (also now owned by Warner Music). With the sell-off of Mushroom Records' UK operations to the Warner Music Group, the role of Infectious within the A&E operations was decreased, with most acts being labelled under Warner's main brands such as Atlantic Records, where Marshall had become Managing Director. Even so, the record label was used again by the multinational group for newly signed "developing" indie acts such as The Subways, who feature under a joint City Pavement/Infectious brand name.

=== Relaunch ===
After leaving WMG, it was announced that Korda Marshall would be relaunching Infectious Records in January 2009 as Infectious Music Ltd. with financial support coming from theatre and sports entrepreneur Michael Watt. Marshall also brought the Mushroom Group's Michael Gudinski onto the board of directors of the company. Hiring former Infectious Records executives Pat Carr of Remote Control Records and Mirelle Davis of Wind Up Bird as consultants to oversee General Management and International Marketing respectively for the new company, he has engaged Robert Horsfall and Mike Skeet's teams at Sound Advice to handle the company's legal and financial affairs.[1]

The first signing to the newly relaunched label was Melbourne band the Temper Trap (also signed to Gudinski's new Australian label Liberation), with alt-J, Drenge and Vance Joy being some of the acts subsequently signed to the label. Infectious Music was acquired by BMG Rights Management (the new 'indie' BMG) in September 2014, with Marshall going on to work with other BMG acts like the Charlatans, Jack Savoretti and Bryan Ferry.

== Artists ==
- Alt-J
- Ash
- Amy Macdonald
- Bloc Party
- DMA's
- Garbage
- Symposium
- My Vitriol
- Seafood
- The Paradise Motel
- The Subways
- General Fiasco
- Local Natives
- Cloud Control
- Drenge
- Ry X
- The Acid
- These New Puritans
- Thom Sonny Green
- The Sherlocks
- Vance Joy
- White Lies
- Charlie Cunningham
