= Thom Sonny Green =

English drummer and music producer (born 1985)

- Green in 2017

Background information
- Born: Thomas Stuart Green; 5 November 1985 (age 40); Harrogate, North Yorkshire, England
- Occupation: Musician
- Instruments: Drums; percussion
- Years active: 2007–present

Thomas Stuart Green (born 5 November 1985), known professionally as Thom Sonny Green, is an English drummer and electronic music producer.

Green attended Leeds University, where he met the musicians with whom he would found the band alt-J in 2007. The band released its debut album, An Awesome Wave, in 2012, followed by This Is All Yours in 2014. In 2016, Green released a solo album of electronic music entitled High Anxiety. The album was recorded over a span of several years while on tour with Alt-J, and reflects Green's medical problems with anxiety and major hearing loss due to Alport syndrome.

== Drumming style ==
Green plays without any type of cymbals, instead replacing the usual hi-hat with a muted cowbell, and the cymbals for a tambourine. He has however added a small Chopper cymbal for the song "Pleader" used on tours after the release of Relaxer. He also uses a small 10-inch snare as his main piece for a more electronic sound. As of 2022, he has added a hi-hat to his kit which he uses in several songs from The Dream.

== Discography ==
=== Solo ===
- High Anxiety (2016)

=== With Alt-J ===
- An Awesome Wave (2012)
- This Is All Yours (2014)
- Relaxer (2017)
- The Dream (2022)
