= Triple J's Hottest 100 of 2012 =

Australian song chart in 2012

2012 Triple J Hottest 100

Countdown details
- Date of countdown: 26 January 2013
- Votes cast: 1,516,765

Countdown highlights
- Winning song: Macklemore & Ryan Lewis featuring Wanz "Thrift Shop"
- Most entries: Flume (4)

Chronology
← Previous; 2011	Next → 2013 (20 Years)

The 2012 Triple J Hottest 100 was announced on January 26, 2013. It was the 20th countdown of the most popular songs of the year, as chosen by the listeners of Australian radio station Triple J.

Voting commenced on 19 December 2012, and closed at midnight on 20 January 2013.

Over 1.5 million votes were cast in this countdown, beating the record set in 2011.

In the week prior to the countdown, Nick Drewe, a Brisbane statistician and marketer, analysed the votes that had been published on social media and determined the possible top 100, naming it the Warmest 100. The votes that had been published represented approximately 2.7% of the total vote. Ultimately, his list correctly predicted 92 of the songs in the countdown, the songs comprising the top 10, and the top 3 in the correct order. The ABC has announced that it would likely make changes to the voting system to prevent "spoiler attempts" in future countdowns.

== Full list ==
Note: Australian artists

#	Song	Artist	Country of origin
1	Thrift Shop	Macklemore & Ryan Lewis featuring Wanz	United States
2	Little Talks	Of Monsters & Men	Iceland
3	Breezeblocks	alt-J	United Kingdom
4	Holdin On	Flume	Australia
5	I Will Wait	Mumford & Sons	United Kingdom
6	Get Free	Major Lazer featuring Amber Coffman	United States
7	Elephant	Tame Impala	Australia
8	Lost	Frank Ocean	United States
9	Feels Like We Only Go Backwards	Tame Impala	Australia
10	My Gun	The Rubens	Australia
11	Sweet Nothing	Calvin Harris featuring Florence Welch	United Kingdom
12	Sleepless	Flume featuring Jezzebel Doran	Australia
13	Gold on the Ceiling	The Black Keys	United States
14	I Love It	Icona Pop featuring Charli XCX	Sweden/United Kingdom
15	Same Love	Macklemore & Ryan Lewis featuring Mary Lambert	United States
16	Not Giving In	Rudimental featuring John Newman and Alex Clare	United Kingdom
17	Clair de Lune	Flight Facilities featuring Christine Hoberg	Australia/United States
18	HyperParadise (Flume Remix)	Hermitude	Australia
19	Angels	The xx	United Kingdom
20	Feel the Love	Rudimental featuring John Newman	United Kingdom
21	Latch	Disclosure featuring Sam Smith	United Kingdom
22	Trembling Hands	The Temper Trap	Australia
23	Coming Down	Ball Park Music	Australia
24	I'm Into You	Chet Faker	Australia
25	Bangarang	Skrillex featuring Sirah	United States
26	Dear Science	Seth Sentry	Australia
27	Surrender	Ball Park Music	Australia
28	Default	Django Django	United Kingdom
29	Cherry Lips	Loon Lake	Australia
30	Laura	Bat for Lashes	United Kingdom
31	Gasoline	Alpine	Australia
32	Spectrum (Say My Name) (Calvin Harris Remix)	Florence & the Machine	United Kingdom
33	Can't Get Better Than This	Parachute Youth	Australia
34	Born to Die	Lana Del Rey	United States
35	Run Alone	360	Australia
36	Paddling Out	Miike Snow	Sweden
37	Sun	Two Door Cinema Club	United Kingdom
38	Oblivion	Grimes	Canada
39	Hold On	Alabama Shakes	United States
40	R U Mine?	Arctic Monkeys	United Kingdom
41	I Can Make You Love Me	British India	Australia
42	Hurricane	MS MR	United States
43	Ho Hey	The Lumineers	United States
44	Follow the Sun	Xavier Rudd	Australia
45	Young and Dumb	Chance Waters featuring Bertie Blackman	Australia
46	Take a Walk	Passion Pit	United States
47	Mountain Sound	Of Monsters & Men	Iceland
48	Fred Astaire	San Cisco	Australia
49	Brother (Like a Version)	Thundamentals	Australia
50	My Heart Is on Fire	Asta	Australia
51	This Fire	Birds of Tokyo	Australia
52	Ghosts	The Presets	Australia
53	Wild Things	San Cisco	Australia
54	I Got Burned	The Bamboos featuring Tim Rogers	Australia
55	Internet Friends	Knife Party	Australia
56	Thinkin Bout You	Frank Ocean	United States
57	Float Away	Seth Sentry	Australia
58	Babel	Mumford & Sons	United Kingdom
59	Love This	Cosmo Jarvis	United Kingdom
60	Love Interruption	Jack White	United States
61	Caress Your Soul	Sticky Fingers	Australia
62	Just What I Am	Kid Cudi featuring King Chip	United States
63	Wolf	First Aid Kit	Sweden
64	Tessellate	alt-J	United Kingdom
65	Genesis	Grimes	Canada
66	The Best We Got	The Rubens	Australia
67	On Top	Flume featuring T.Shirt	Australia/United States
68	Silhouettes	Avicii	Sweden
69	Lonely Boy (Like a Version)	Matt Corby	Australia
70	Promises	The Presets	Australia
71	Swimming Pools (Drank)	Kendrick Lamar	United States
72	All the Rowboats	Regina Spektor	United States
73	Draw a Crowd	Ben Folds Five	United States
74	Simple Song	The Shins	United States
75	Madness	Muse	United Kingdom
76	Heard It All	Illy	Australia
77	Love Is All I Got	Feed Me and Crystal Fighters	United Kingdom
78	Household Goods	Totally Enormous Extinct Dinosaurs	United Kingdom
79	Little Black Submarines	The Black Keys	United States
80	Super Rich Kids	Frank Ocean featuring Earl Sweatshirt	United States
81	Something Good	alt-J	United Kingdom
82	Disparate Youth	Santigold	United States
83	She's a Riot	The Jungle Giants	Australia
84	Rattling the Keys to the Kingdom	Hilltop Hoods	Australia
85	Fineshrine	Purity Ring	Canada
86	Summertime Sadness	Lana Del Rey	United States
87	Chronicles of a Fallen Love	The Bloody Beetroots featuring Greta Svabo Bech	Italy/Denmark
88	Down the Road	C2C	France
89	Maybe Tomorrow	Chance Waters featuring Lilian Blue	Australia
90	Sleep Alone	Two Door Cinema Club	United Kingdom
91	So Good	Allday & C1	Australia
92	Spiritus	Lisa Mitchell	Australia
93	Dance Bear	Snakadaktal	Australia
94	45	The Gaslight Anthem	United States
95	Andy	Last Dinosaurs	Australia
96	Clique	Kanye West featuring Big Sean and Jay Z	United States
97	I'm Shakin'	Jack White	United States
98	Warrior	Kimbra featuring Mark Foster and A-Trak	New Zealand/United States/Canada
99	Bad Girls	M.I.A.	United Kingdom
100	Cough Cough	Everything Everything	United Kingdom

=== #101–#200 List ===
On 1 February 2013, Triple J broadcast the "second Hottest 100" countdown.

#	Song	Artist	Country of origin
101	Don't Save Me	Haim	United States
102	Rabbit Hole	The Temper Trap	Australia
103	Survival Expert	Something for Kate	Australia
104	Language	Porter Robinson	United States
105	Idea of Happiness	Van She	Australia
106	Forever	Haim	United States
107	Chasing Ghosts	The Amity Affliction	Australia
108	Need Your Love	The Temper Trap	Australia
109	Karmageddon	Abbe May	Australia
110	My Scene	Seth Sentry	Australia
111	Mercy	Kanye West, Big Sean, Pusha T and 2 Chainz	United States
112	Chained	The xx	United Kingdom
113	Where Ya Been	Illy featuring Pez	Australia
114	Boy	Emma Louise	Australia
115	Drinking From the Sun	Hilltop Hoods	Australia
116	Die a Happy Man	Tuka featuring Jane Tyrrell	Australia
117	Unashamed Desire	Missy Higgins	Australia
118	Get in My Life	Hermitude	Australia
119	Speaking in Tongues	Hilltop Hoods featuring Chali 2na	Australia/United States
120	Passerby	Grinspoon	Australia
121	Inhaler	Foals	United Kingdom
122	Apocalypse Dreams	Tame Impala	Australia
123	The House That Heaven Built	Japandroids	Canada
124	Bless This Mess	Lisa Mitchell	Australia
125	Pyramids	Frank Ocean	United States
126	I'm Corrupt	DCUP	Australia
127	HyperParadise	Hermitude	Australia
128	Jah No Partial	Major Lazer featuring Flux Pavilion	United States/United Kingdom
129	Youth in Trouble	The Presets	Australia
130	How Can You Swallow So Much Sleep	Bombay Bicycle Club	Australia
131	Souls A’Fire	Matt Corby	Australia
132	That's What's Up	Edward Sharpe & the Magnetic Zeros	United States
133	I Fink U Freeky	Die Antwoord	South Africa
134	Ill Manors	Plan B	United Kingdom
135	Dark Days	Parkway Drive	Australia
136	Runaways	The Killers	United States
137	Escape	Asta	Australia
138	Give Me Time	Eagle & the Worm	Australia
139	Hearts a Mess (Like a Version)	Missy Higgins	Australia
140	Sweet Sour	Band of Skulls	United Kingdom
141	Heart of a Lion	The Griswolds	Australia
142	Wild Love	Gossling	Australia
143	She's My Baby	Kingswood	Australia
144	National Anthem	Lana Del Rey	United States
145	Playing with Fire	Plan B featuring Labrinth	United Kingdom
146	Medusa	Kingswood	Australia
147	Neighbour Neighbour	Violent Soho	Australia
148	Hollywood Forever Cemetery Sings	Father John Misty	United States
149	Do It with a Rockstar	Amanda Palmer & The Grand Theft Orchestra	United States
150	Octopus	Bloc Party	United Kingdom
151	Jamaica	Van She	Australia
152	Rocksteady	The Bloody Beetroots	Italy
153	Knee Length Socks	Urthboy	Australia
154	Born at the Right Time	Dappled Cities	Australia
155	Do It Anyway	Ben Folds Five	United States
156	Bird on the Buffalo	Angus Stone	Australia
157	Heartbreak	Clubfeet featuring Chela	Australia
158	Off to the Races	Lana Del Rey	United States
159	Gonna Make It	Vydamo	Australia
160	Left Alone	Flume featuring Chet Faker	Australia
161	Above the Water	Art of Sleeping	Australia
162	Don’t Ever Want To Be Found	The Rubens	Australia
163	Water Bombs	Twinsy	Australia
164	This Head I Hold	Electric Guest	United States
165	Broken Brights	Angus Stone	Australia
166	Bloom	Gypsy & The Cat	Australia
167	The Wave	Miike Snow	Sweden
168	All Your Gold	Bat for Lashes	United Kingdom
169	Beauty in the Bricks	Spit Syndicate	Australia
170	Tinderbox	Violent Soho	Australia
171	Hang Loose	Alabama Shakes	United States
172	Truth	Bloc Party	United Kingdom
173	Clouds & Cream	Sticky Fingers	Australia
174	The Keepers	Santigold	United States
175	Don’t Wanna Grow Up Anymore	Bob Evans	Australia
176	Video Games (Like a Version)	Bluejuice	Australia
177	The Only Place	Best Coast	United States
178	Someone Purer	Mystery Jets	United Kingdom
179	Myth	Beach House	United States
180	Empty Hands	Art of Sleeping	Australia
181	Can't Hold Us	Macklemore & Ryan Lewis featuring Ray Dalton	United States
182	No Beef	Afrojack and Steve Aoki featuring Miss Palmer	Netherlands/United States
183	Frivolous Life	YesYou featuring Marcus Azon	Australia
184	Yet Again	Grizzly Bear	United States
185	Ride	Lana Del Rey	United States
186	Be Ready When I Say Go	Emperors	Australia
187	Fitzpleasure	alt-J	United Kingdom
188	Baguette?	Tyler Touché	Australia
189	Told You So	Cub Scouts	Australia
190	Beautiful	TZU	Australia
191	The Game	Pez	Australia
192	Open Letter	The Amity Affliction	Australia
193	Sharp Shooter	Hungry Kids of Hungary	Australia
194	Seeing Red	Alpine	Australia
195	Wake Up	Dead Letter Circus	Australia
196	September	St. Lucia	United States
197	Miracle Cure	Something for Kate	Australia
198	Wicked Games	The Weeknd	Canada
199	Chaos Theory	ShockOne	Australia
200	Centipede	Knife Party	Australia

== Statistics ==
=== Artists with multiple entries ===
#	Artist	Tracks
4	Flume (Note: Three times solo (4, 12, 67) and one remix (18))	4, 12, 18, 67
3	alt-J	3, 64, 81
3	Frank Ocean	8, 56, 80
2	Macklemore & Ryan Lewis	1, 15
2	Of Monsters and Men	2, 47
2	Tame Impala	7, 9
2	Mumford & Sons	5, 58
2	The Rubens	10, 66
2	Calvin Harris (Note: Once solo (11) and one remix (32))	11, 32
2	Florence Welch (Note: Once with Calvin Harris (11) and once with Florence and the Machine (32))	11, 32
2	The Black Keys	13, 79
2	Rudimental	16, 20
2	John Newman (Note: Twice with Rudimental)	16, 20
2	Ball Park Music	(23, 27
2	Seth Sentry	26, 57
2	Lana Del Rey	34, 86
2	Two Door Cinema Club	37, 90
2	Grimes	38, 65
2	Chance Waters	45, 89
2	San Cisco	48, 53
2	The Presets	52, 70
2	Jack White	60, 97

=== Countries represented ===
Country	Total
Australia	41
United States	29
United Kingdom	23
Canada	4
Sweden	4
Iceland	2
New Zealand	1
France	1
Italy	1
Faroe Islands	1

=== Records ===
- For the second year in a row, the songs "Lonely Boy" and "Brother" charted in the countdown. This time "Lonely Boy" was covered by Matt Corby, who ranked at No. 3 (with his song "Brother") behind the original song by The Black Keys in the previous year's Hottest 100 (at No. 2). The version of "Brother" that appears in this year's countdown is a cover by Thundamentals.
- There were eight songs in a row by Australian artists between positions No. 55 and No. 48. This is the equal longest run of Australian songs since 1999.
- For the fourth consecutive year, an artist from Triple J Unearthed made it into the Top 10 of the countdown. Flume ranked at No. 4 this year.
- "Thrift Shop" is the first hip-hop song to top the chart in Hottest 100 history. It also breaks the record of highest ranking hip-hop song, which was previously set by Coolio, the Gorillaz and Hilltop Hoods, all of whom placed third in 1995, 2005, 2006 and 2009.
- "My Heart Is on Fire" by Asta marks the first appearance in the countdown by the winning entry in Unearthed High. 2011 winners Snakadaktal charted in the previous countdown with a song they had recorded after winning the competition.
- For the first time since 2008, no Australian artist featured in the Top 3.
- For the first time since 1993, the four highest charting artists in this year's countdown were all debutants.
  - Additionally, the four highest charting artists in this year's countdown were acts from four nations. This is the first time in the poll's history this has occurred.
- 78 artists made in into the chart; this makes this list the second most diverse list after the 1997 list.
- For the second year in a row, Calvin Harris placed at #11.
- Greta Svabo Bech is the first artist from the Faroe Islands to appear in the Hottest 100.
- Then Australian Prime Minister Julia Gillard announced her favorite song of the year – "Clair de Lune" by Flight Facilities.
- Ben Folds Five appearance at #73 with "Draw a Crowd" equaled the record set by Robert Smith in 2010 for the longest absence between countdowns; their last appearance was in 1999.

== Top 10 Albums of 2012 ==
A smaller poll of Triple J listeners' favourite albums of the year was held in December 2012.

Note: Australian artists

Bold indicates J Award for Australian Album of the Year winner.

#	Artist	Album	Country of origin	Tracks in the Hottest 100
1	**Tame Impala**	**Lonerism**	**Australia**	7, 9
2	The Black Keys	El Camino	United States	13, 79 (2 in 2011)
3	The Rubens	The Rubens	Australia	10, 66 (57 in 2011)
4	Mumford & Sons	Babel	United Kingdom	5, 58
5	Ball Park Music	Museum	Australia	23, 27
6	alt-J	An Awesome Wave	United Kingdom	3, 64, 81
7	**Flume**	**Flume**	Australia	4, 12, 67
8	The xx	Coexist	United Kingdom	19
9	Frank Ocean	Channel Orange	United States	8, 56, 80
10	San Cisco	San Cisco	Australia	48, 53

== CD release ==
The Triple J Hottest 100 CD for 2012 is the twentieth edition of the CD series. It was released on 22 February 2013.

**CD 1**
1. Macklemore and Ryan Lewis feat. Wanz – "Thrift Shop"
2. Flume – "Holdin On"
3. The Rubens – "My Gun"
4. alt–J – "Breezeblocks"
5. Frank Ocean – "Lost"
6. Florence and the Machine – "Spectrum (Say My Name)" (Calvin Harris Remix)
7. Loon Lake – "Cherry Lips"
8. The Black Keys – "Gold on the Ceiling"
9. Major Lazer feat. Amber Coffman – "Get Free"
10. Chet Faker – "I'm Into You"
11. The xx – "Angels"
12. Seth Sentry – "Dear Science"
13. Django Django – "Default"
14. Miike Snow – "Paddling Out"
15. Parachute Youth – "Can't Get Better Than This"
16. Ball Park Music – "Coming Down"
17. MS MR – "Hurricane"
18. Skrillex feat. Sirah – "Bangarang"
19. Birds of Tokyo – "This Fire"
20. Two Door Cinema Club – "Sun"
21. Alpine – "Gasoline"
**CD 2**
1. Of Monsters and Men – "Little Talks"
2. Tame Impala – "Elephant"
3. Icona Pop feat. Charli XCX – "I Love It"
4. 360 – "Run Alone"
5. The Temper Trap – "Trembling Hands"
6. Disclosure feat. Sam Smith – "Latch"
7. Rudimental feat. John Newman and Alex Clare – "Not Giving In"
8. Mumford & Sons – "I Will Wait"
9. Grimes – "Oblivion"
10. Asta – "My Heart Is on Fire"
11. Totally Enormous Extinct Dinosaurs – "Household Goods"
12. San Cisco – "Fred Astaire"
13. Chance Waters feat. Bertie Blackman – "Young and Dumb"
14. Hermitude – "HyperParadise" (Flume Remix)
15. Feed Me and Crystal Fighters – "Love Is All I Got"
16. Everything Everything – "Cough Cough"
17. Alabama Shakes – "Hold On"
18. Sticky Fingers – "Caress Your Soul"
19. Bat For Lashes – "Laura"
20. Flight Facilities feat. Christine Hoberg – "Clair De Lune"
