= On Top =

On Top may refer to:

- On Top (film), a 1982 Icelandic comedy
- On Top (album), a 1966 album by the Four Tops
- On Top, a 1968 album by the Heptones
- On Top, a 2002 album by Rye Coalition
- "On Top" (The Killers song), 2004
- "On Top" (Twista song), 2009
- "On Top" (Flume song), 2012
- "On Top" (Johnny Ruffo song), 2012

== See also ==
- Terms of orientation
