= Luke Girgis =

Australian rapper

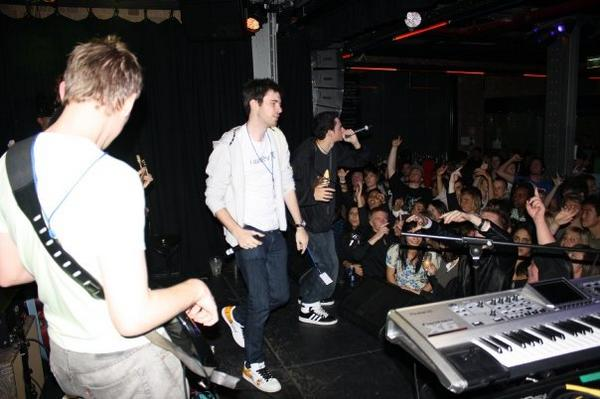
- Oxford Art Factory, Sydney

Background information
- Also known as: Coptic Soldier
- Born: Melbourne, Victoria, Australia
- Origin: Sydney, New South Wales, Australia
- Genre: Hip hop
- Occupations: Rapper, manager, producer, record executive
- Instrument: Voice
- Years active: 2005–2011
- Label: Nurcha
- Website: web.archive.org/web/20130531092158/http://copticsoldier.com/

Luke George Girgis, formerly known by his stage name, Coptic Soldier, is an Australian hip-hop artist, music manager, record label executive, and publisher. He often performed with stage partner, Phatchance (aka Chance Waters) and later became his manager.

Girgis founded a talent management company, Be Like Children, in 2006, and in 2013 co-founded a record label, I Forgot Sorry! In 2017 he established Seventh Street Media Pty Ltd, first acquiring music publications, Tone Deaf and The Brag, and later expanding to include several other publications under the Brag Media Australia trade name.

== Early life and education ==
Luke George Girgis was born in Melbourne. His parents were second generation Egyptian migrants who raised him in Sydney's Sutherland Shire as a member of the Australian Coptic Orthodox church.

He attended St Patrick's College in Sutherland. He later recalled his first live band "A Year 12 rock band in the school hall when I was in Year 5. – Can't remember their name..."; from that performance he learnt "That no matter how bad your music is, you can always make a crowd laugh".

Girgis obtained a degree in rehabilitation counselling at the University of Sydney before completing a degree in theology at Charles Sturt University.

== Music career as Coptic Soldier ==
Coptic Soldier was signed to Nurcha Records in 2005 before its closure in 2009. He remembered, in 2008, that he was "first introduced to hip hop by the likes of US bigwigs Eminem and Tupac, but has since drawn inspiration from artists closer to home." His performance name acknowledges his heritage in the Coptic Christian faith and his "fighting for what you believe in." He released his debut mix tape, False Start, on that label in 2006. InTheMix's Xpose described his work: "While this release isn't in the upper echelon of those currently coming out in this country, it definitely impressed me. Potential wise Coptic Soldier has a lot to offer, he is an emcee you want to hear more from as he speaks what is on many of our minds." As from 2007 he ran an artist management company, The Girgis Circus, which catered for his fellow artists, including Phatchance aka Chance Waters.

In 2010 Coptic Soldier teamed up with Sydney soul vocalist Miriam Waks and independently released an extended play, The Sound of Wings, which was produced by K21, an Adelaide-based hip hop artist. As a solo artist he independently distributed a release, The Past Three Years. He described it as "a street release that really reflects my life in the last three years... I write basically whatever is on my mind. Most recently I have been in huge reflection about my growth and fortune, so all the music I seem to be writing at the moment shows just that."

In March 2010 he joined Phatchance for a national tour, Inkstains, which saw the pair co-headline nine dates across Australia. He also provided management for other hip hop artists Mind over Matter and Elgen & Johnny Utah; and for a pop music artist, HR King. Also in that year he co-founded an independent record label, I Forget, Sorry!, together with Phatchance and Mind over Matter, to cater for the artists' releases. He explained his plans to Birdie of Beat magazine, "The biggest focus will be this acoustic tour for now but we do have a couple of other big things that we’ll work on after that. Chance is going to work on his album, which I’m excited about – that will hopefully be late this year or early next year. Then I'm going to be doing my album late next year too. For me the acoustic EP is a sequel to my debut EP [The Sound Of Wings] with Miriam Waks and a guy from Adelaide called K21 who won the Hilltop Hoods initiative."

During 2011 Coptic Soldier and Phatchance undertook a combined Hey Where's Your DJ tour, which Chris Singh of The AU Review caught, "When one thinks of live hip-hop, the usual picture in their head is that of at least one emcee rapping to the beats dropped by at least one DJ – a format often criticised by those outside of hip-hop. Every so often, a hip-hop act comes along and replaces the DJ with a backing band, not only giving their concert much more musical credibility, but allowing for more creative live interpretations of each of their songs... [the pair] decided to start experimenting with instrumental interpretations of their fine Aussie hip-hop tracks, national interest in these two emcees skyrocketed and their resulting acoustic EPs were met with more success than they hoped for." In May 2011 the pair appeared on Hip Hop Show on youth radio, Triple J; they were interviewed by the host, Hau Latukefu, who also played their tracks, "No More Waiting" (by Coptic Soldier featuring Phatchance) and "Liquid Company" (by Coptic Soldier, live in the studio).

In May 2012 Coptic Soldier was performing solo shows through New South Wales to Coffs Harbour.

== Management and other roles ==
In February 2006 Girgis founded talent management company Be Like Children with the mission statement to be "always artist first".

As Chance Waters' manager, in 2012, he negotiated for that artist's album, Infinity, to appear on Permanent Records, an imprint of Shock Records.

From November 2012 until October 2014, Girgis was player development officer for the professional rugby league club Sydney Roosters.

In 2013 Girgis worked to negotiate a deal for Chance Waters with Island Records Australia, a subsidiary of the Universal Music Group. Due to Waters' tracks being listed at number 89 in the 2012 Triple J Hottest 100, that artist also signed a publishing contract with Universal Music Publishing.

In 2014 Girgis was given funds from The Seed Arts Music Grant to attend a management workshop. He formed a performance duo, Run to Damascus, with Jon Reichardt, to release a single, "Hide & Seek", via I Forget, Sorry! The track was mixed and executive produced by Waters.

Also in 2014 he and his business partner, Matt Cannings, formed Careless Management (part of Be Like Children) and became co-managers of Sydney-based pop rock act, Little Sea, and signed them to a deal with Sony Music Australia. They debuted at number 1 on the Australian iTunes music chart, before touring Australia as main support for international stars 5 Seconds of Summer.

In July 2015 Girgis oversaw the release of Little Sea's EP, With You Without You, featuring the single, "Change for Love", which peaked in the ARIA Singles Chart top 40.

From November 2015 until July 2016 Girgis was A&R/label director at Shock Records.

Be Like Children was terminated in December 2016.

=== Brag Media ===
Early in 2017 he established Seventh Street Media Pty Ltd with the acquisition of the privately owned music publications, Tone Deaf, The Brag, and J Play. Rolling Stone Australia, Tone Deaf, The Brag, The Industry Observer, the Gig Guide are among the brands owned or operated by Seventh Street Media, trading as The Brag Media Australia, which describes itself as "Australia's biggest youth publisher". Others include The Music Network, IndieWire, Variety Australia, Epic Digital (founded in 2019), don't bore us, Funimation, Enthusiast Gaming, Life Without Andy, and HypeBeast. The Brag Media is a publishing and events company with a focus on music.

Tone Deaf was acquired by Seventh Street Media in January 2017, along with The Brag (formerly published by Furst Media) and J Play. The Music Network was purchased by The Brag Media in February 2022. J Play was a B2B resource showcasing and tracking artists and songs played on Triple J radio. Launched in 2006 by Paul Stipack, it created a large archive of statistics of every song played by Triple j over 12 years. Owing to changes in the music industry, including the need to track many other sources, its usefulness diminished, and it ceased operation in January 2019. The Brag Media retained the J Play database of 40,000 songs, 11,000 artists, and 15,000 playlists. Don't Bore Us was a pop music social media hub (on Instagram and Facebook), launched in January 2017. It was expanded to a new website in May 2017, but appears to have folded into Tone Deaf at some point after that.

In September 2023 the key people at The Brag Media were: editor-in-chief Poppy Reid; CEO Luke Girgis; and chief operating officer Joel King. In 2024 The Brag Media was acquired by Vinyl Group, and on 5 June 2024 Girgis (then described as managing director and publisher) left the company.

In February 2025 Girgis sued Vinyl Group alleging that he had not been paid his performance payouts. Vinyl Media refuted this, claiming: “Mr Girgis was terminated for serious misconduct, including but not limited to financial misconduct”.

== Personal life ==
As of 2017 Girgis was living in Sydney with his wife Christine and their child. He is an active Christian and wrote an article in support of same-sex marriage ahead of his the Australian same-sex marriage postal survey conducted in 2017.

== Discography ==
=== Albums ===
- Nobody Give Raph a Guest Spot with Phatchance (2008)
- The Past Three Years (2008)
- Coptic Soldier & Miriam Waks (2010)
- The Sound of Wings 2 (with Miriam Waks) (2011)

=== Mixtapes ===
- False Start Mixtape (2006)
- Their Sound, Our Wings (18 December 2011)

=== As part of Run to Damascus ===
- "Hide & Seek" (March 2014)
