= Mind over Matter (band) =

Mind Over Matter
- Also known as: Smiles Again & Willow
- Origin: Sydney, Australia
- Genres: Australian hip-hop
- Years active: 2004–present
- Label: Independent

Mind Over Matter is an Australian hip-hop outfit from Sydney, Australia consisting of MC Smiles Again and DJ Ntaprize. Previously, the lineup also included MC Willow, but he left the group in 2014. The group has played alongside and toured in support of some of Australia's biggest artists, including Jebediah, Bliss n Eso, Drapht, The Herd and Pez.

== Biography ==
What was originally a duo, Willow (Rowan Lockyer) and Smiles Again (Martin Brown) met at St.Pius X College Chatswood in Year 7. By Year 9 Lockyer and Brown were practicing their freestyle skills and working together on what would become the roots of their music.

Mind Over Matter first surfaced on the Australian hip-hop scene in 2006 with a short mixtape titled For Our Hip Hoppers. This independent release resulted in Mind Over Matter signing to Sydney-based Nurcha Records for their Debut LP Keepin' It Breezy'.

The album features Dj Ilz on the majority of the tracks and although not an official member of the group, DJ Ilz has been touring and performing with the group since 2006. Keepin' It Breezy was executively produced by Phatchance and Drakezilla and recorded at Ilz studios in Sydney, the album received accolades in Australian Street Press and Media. The group appeared on the Triple J Hip Hop show to discuss the album with Hau (of Koolism) and the first single for the album Proud received national rotation on the station. The second single for the album "Clipped Wings" featured Vast Aire of Cannibal Ox fame and garnered single of the week on FBi Radio, the group were also interviewed on the station as part of the weekly hip-hop show.

In 2009 the group released a second mixtape entitled Free the Wolves. The mixtape was executively produced by Phatchance and serves as a bridge between the first album and their next official release; it was called a departure from the happy-go-lucky sound of Keepin' It Breezy. The band launched the mixtape to a sold-out crowd at Oxford Arts Factory performing with Dj Illa and Saving Grace for a youth based charity Exodus Youth Worx.

On 18 March 2011 the duo released their sophomore record Just Like Fireworks.

In 2014 Mind Over Matter announced that they had become a trio with the introduction of their new DJ (DJ Ntaprize). They created their first album as a Trio on 30 March 2014, "This Way to Elsewhere". This album included many featuring artists such as Bliss n Eso, Chance Waters, Vida Sunshyne, Mantra, and K.I.K.I. This album was produced by Martin Brown (Smiles Again) and Jon Reichardt.

In December 2015 it was announced that Willow was leaving the group due to "creative differences". The creative differences he referred to, were that Smiles and manager Luke Girgis allegedly told him to "cut down on my spiritual/political content because they believe the majority can’t relate". He added “That sort of thing goes against everything that I stand for and I simply can’t resonate with people on that wavelength”. These claims were denied by both Smiles and Luke.

=== Awards ===
- Keepin' It Breezy was nominated for Album of the Year 2008 in J Mag.

== Discography ==
- For Our Hip Hoppers mixtape (2006) - Independent
- Keepin' It Breezy (2008) - Nurcha Records
- Free the Wolves mixtape (2009) - Independent
- Just Like Fireworks (2011)
- "This Way to Elsewhere" (2014)

=== Singles ===
- "Proud" featuring Dj Illa (2008)
- "Clipped Wings" featuring Vast Aire and Dj Illa (2008)
- "It's Not a Secret" (2009)
- "Real Life" Featuring K.I.K.I (2013)
- "Somebody's love" Featuring Ernst Carter Jnr. (2013)
- "What They Say" Featuring Bliss n Eso (2014)
- "The Ghost & The Wolf" (2014)
