= Miley Cyrus: Tongue Tied =

2014 short film starring Miley Cyrus

- Directed by: Quentin Jones
- Produced by: Michael Angelos; Neil Cooper; Nina Qayyum
- Starring: Miley Cyrus
- Music by: 30s; Zoee
- Distributed by: Nowness
- Release date: May 1, 2014
- Running time: 2 minutes
- Country: United States
- Language: English

Miley Cyrus: Tongue Tied (alternatively titled Miley) is an American short film directed by photographer Quentin Jones and starring recording artist Miley Cyrus. It was released on May 1, 2014, by the lifestyle website Nowness, although it had been previously used for the introduction of her headlining Bangerz Tour. The black-and-white video displays a topless Cyrus engaging in several sadomasochistic behaviors. Contemporary critics compared Miley Cyrus: Tongue Tied to earlier music videos by recording artist Madonna and the erotic novel Fifty Shades of Grey (2011), and agreed that it continued to solidify the sexually-explicit public image she had cultivated in 2013.

== Background and production ==
"Stripping the color from our heroine’s cartoonish persona, Jones goes in on popular symbols of sex: the fishnets; the beauty mark made darker like Marilyn’s; the black collar fit for a 'Bunny. To Miley, as to a little kid, even the most dangerous object is a toy. And like a kid’s, her near-nudity is hardly erotic. She’s just happier naked. Her poses are jokes, even that infamous tongue—stuck out—remains firmly in cheek. She holds up the cardboard cut-out and winks. Get it? She’s playing with herself."

— Sarah Nicole Prickett of Adult describing the concept of Miley Cyrus: Tongue Tied.

Miley Cyrus: Tongue Tied was first premiered during Cyrus' headlining Bangerz Tour in February 2014; it was used as an introductory interlude for her performances, and was musically accompanied by the track "Fitzpleasure" by the English band Alt-J. It was later re-released on May 1, 2014, during which time Cyrus was recovering from an allergic reaction that consequently delayed the tour.

Miley Cyrus: Tongue Tied was created by the production and representation agency Cadence, headquartered in New York City. Neil Cooper and Nina Qayyum were enlisted as its executive producers, while Michael Angelos is recognized as a third producer. In addition to directing the project, Quentin Jones was responsible for creating its animations. Peter Duffy and Johnny Langer collaborated for the music and sound design. Diane Martel was secured as the creative director of the project; she had previously worked with Cyrus for her music video for the track "We Can't Stop" and her controversial performance at the 2013 MTV Video Music Awards. Paul Laufner and Sandra Winther were respectively employed as the director of photography and artwork assistant. Simone Harouche is acknowledged as a stylist; Cyrus' hair was done by Andy Lecompte, while her makeup was done by Pati Dubrogg.

== Synopsis ==
A screenshot from Miley Cyrus: Tongue Tied, where Cyrus is seen wearing latex underwear and electrical tape while playing with bondage-style restraints.

A two-minute short film, Miley Cyrus: Tongue Tied features the track "Stockholm Syndrome" by 30's featuring Zoee. Heavily inspired by electronic music, its lyrics "hold me down so it's hard to breathe" contribute to the overtly sexual nature of the video. The film is alternatively named Miley in its title card; the black-and-white film itself is contained within a square, and is bordered by excess white space on either side.

Cyrus is dressed in black latex underwear throughout the clip, with electrical tape covering her nipples, and is occasionally seen in fishnets. The video frequently alternates between footage of Cyrus making facial expressions with cartoon-styled eyes and noses layered on her face and Cyrus wearing latex bands commonly associated with sadomasochism (S&M). She is additionally seen suspended mid-air by ribbons in an acrobatic fashion, hanging from a rod with her legs provocatively spread, and suggestively showing her buttocks to the camera. As the clip progresses, Cyrus cries as she spreads black oil across her face, which she later smears across her body in a sexual manner.

== Critical reception ==
Contemporary critics centered much of their commentary of Miley Cyrus: Tongue Tied around its prominent sadomasochistic elements. Writing for Complex, Leigh Silver described the project as a "bondage-themed joy ride", and felt that its potential shock value was lessened considering Cyrus' previously sexual displays. Leanne Bayley from Glamour described the film as "very Fifty Shades of Grey-esque" and felt that it was an unsurprisingly "pretty controversial" display from Cyrus. Despite commenting that her wardrobe was "quite demure [...] by her standards", Mike Wass from Idolator opined that the sadomasochistic inspiration "[spices] things up"; he elaborated that the video was "stylish and beautifully shot" and restored Cyrus' position as "the queen of shock" from recording artist Rihanna, who had generated media attention for a topless magazine spread in Lui.

While stating that the project was "sexy", Oscar Lopez admitted that its concept was unoriginal considering its similarities to the visuals for "Vogue" and "Like a Prayer" by Madonna. Writing for Look, Robyn Munson described Miley Cyrus: Tongue Tied as "one of her most artistic – and attention-grabbing – to date"; she expressed particular surprise in Cyrus' continued ability to shock her audience despite having frequently painted herself in a sexual light. Emily Hewett from Metro thought that the project "was done in the name of art", whereas Cyrus' earlier endeavors come across as being provocative "in a blatant bid to boost record sales". After classifying the clip as not safe for work, Lauren Valenti from Marie Claire acknowledged it as the "latest viral reminder that Miley's Disney days are far behind her. Ryan Reed from Rolling Stone called the video "jaw-dropping" and felt that it was an extension of the "psychedelic side" that Cyrus had recently displayed through on-stage collaborations with Wayne Coyne and Steven Drozd of The Flaming Lips.

Amiya Moretta opined that the clip "boldly confronts double standards that exist between socially acceptable expressions of sexuality" and wondered "if this [was] the spawn of a sexual revolution." She described the video as "incredibly sexualized and aesthetically captivating, as the black and white combinations of fluttering eyelashes, slathered black paint and eye masks appeal to the limited attention spans of today’s generation. The mixed-media music video is short and surreal, using layers of photography, illustration, and animation to create a story."

== Credits and personnel ==
Credits adapted from Nowness.

- Michael Angelos – producer
- Neil Cooper – executive producer
- Pati Dubrogg – makeup
- Peter Duffy – music and sound design
- Simone Harouche – stylist
- Quentin Jones – director, animation
- Johnny Langer – music and sound design
- Paul Laufer – director of photography
- Andy Lecompte – hair
- Diane Martel – creative director
- Nina Qayyum – executive producer
- Sandra Winther – artwork assistant
