= Whispers in the Dark =

Whispers in the Dark may refer to:

- Whispers in the Dark (film), a 1992 thriller starring Annabella Sciorra and Anthony La Paglia
- Whispers in the Dark (album), a 1999 album by Profyle
- Whispers in the Dark, a 1992 novel by Jonathan Aycliffe
- Whispers in the Dark, a 2012 EP by Luke James
- "Whispers in the Dark" (Indecent Obsession song), 1992
- "Whispers in the Dark" (Skillet song), 2006
- "Whispers in the Dark" (Mumford & Sons song), 2012
- "Whispers in the Dark", a song by Yanni from In My Time
- "Whispers in the Dark", a song from the 1937 film Artists and Models

== See also ==
- "Whisper in the Dark", a song by Dionne Warwick from Friends
