= Shirt (artist) =

- Also known as: T.Shirt
- Origin: Queens, New York City
- Genres: Hip hop
- Years active: 2009–present
- Label: Third Man Records

Shirt, formerly known as T.Shirt, is an American rapper and conceptual artist based in Queens, New York City. He is known for the music that is a blend of rap music, appropriation and performance art. Shirt has produced works of writing, video, painting, public installations and performances around the world, as well as made internet art and produced clothing. He released his debut album, Wild Thing, in 2009. In 2018, Shirt released an album titled Pure Beauty, produced in partnership with the independent label Third Man Records run by Jack White of The White Stripes. Pure Beauty was met with positive reviews from Pitchfork, The Guardian and Loud and Quiet.

== Music career ==
=== 2009-2012 ===
Shirt released his first album Wild Thing online in 2009. His second album, Tan-Face Children, was released in 2010. In a press release for the announcement of Tan-Face Children, the 8-track EP executive produced by Shirt and Darvin Silva, was described as being inspired by the Walt Whitman poem "Pioneers! O Pioneers!".

In 2011, Shirt released the album I Should Just Chill, leading with the single "Ode To Raekwon," which received the stamp of approval from Wu-Tang Clan member Raekwon.

Shirt's fourth studio album, The Fuck, was released in 2012. HipHopDX gave the album 4 out of 5 stars and lauded its "rich production full of beating drums and haunting high-end melodies." A hard drive containing studio sessions from the album was purportedly lost before its release. A single from the album, titled "Southside Phantom," produced by Maker, was featured on HBO's Silicon Valley soundtrack.

=== 2013-2015 ===
The album titled Rap was released on February 12, 2014, with no warning. The thirty-minute album plays as one long track, and is available free on the artist's SoundCloud page. The album titled MUSEUM was released in 2015 and was available for a limited time on the artist's website.

In 2015, Shirt released his fifth album, Records. The album consisted of a collection of previously released songs such as "Bengal Tiger" (2015) and "Cuba (2015)," as well as new songs that explored Shirt's romantic relationships, friendships, and further bouts of introspection.

Shirt released the 6-track EP, Rap Money, to digital streaming services in 2015, a week after Records. The Chicago-based indie label, Closed Sessions, signed on to distribute the work, making Shirt the label's first non-Chicago based artist to release music with the CS stamp of approval. The EP features fellow Queens-native recording artists Nina Sky on the song "Let It Go."

=== 2016-2018 ===
On February 9, 2018, Shirt and Third Man Records released Pure Beauty to digital streaming platforms. The project's lead single, titled "Flight Home" was produced by San Holo and released with the announcement that Shirt would be the first rapper to sign to Jack White's record label. The album received mixed reviews. Pitchfork cited the opening track "Snowbeach" as filled with "the same street-smart, razor-sharp flow that Raekwon himself perfected on the fabled "Purple Tape" and gave the record a 6.3 out of 10 rating. London's Loud and Quiet gave the record an 8/10 saying it was "triumphant work over neo-boom bap beats and immaculate samples" and likened the breadth of Shirt's catalog as part Kanye West, part Nas and Jay-Z.

=== Single recordings ===
Shirt has released several one-off rap recordings throughout his career. "On Top," the lead single written by Shirt from Flume's debut album, reached its peak at number 57 in Australia on March 4, 2013, and was certified gold. In the same year Shirt released the fifteen-minute "Shrines (Remix)" after Purity Ring's 2012 record, released without the band's permission. In 2013, Shirt released the standalone single "Automatic." The beat was produced by Supreme Breed, and Complex called it a "platform for the MC to detail his recent adventures with drugs, sex, and live performances." Others released included Chuchi and Jujo" (2015), "Cuba" (2015), "Bengal Tiger" (2014), DJ Rude's "1,000 Dutches" (2016), and "Van Gogh" (2013), produced by San Holo. Shirt's version of Bobby Shmurda's "Hot Nigga Freestyle" (2013) premiered on BBC 1Xtra. On "It Be Your Own Drums" (2018), Shirt criticizes Kanye West over a beat looped from a snippet of another beat found in a video posted to Twitter of Kanye working in the studio. In 2014, on the Illmatic#20 Tribute Mixtape which the blogs Nahright and Upnorthtrips put together, featuring a slew of NYC rappers paying tribute to Nas' debut on its 20th anniversary, Shirt's, "The World Is Yours (Remix)," had some 400k more streams than any other record on the project. In 2015, Shirt used sentences from the pages of poet and artist Kenneth Goldsmith's book Theory (2015), to create the three verses on the High Frequency-produced record "Theory." For "$250 On Soundcloud" (2015), Shirt announced that he would team up with any producer who paid him $250, and within seven days record and release a song to live strictly on the producer's SoundCloud page. Five tracks were produced under the parameters, including "Live If You Can" (2015) and the Ayesroc-produced "Fight Club" (2015). "Pachuca Sunrise" (2014) was released when a physical copy of the Rap (2014) album unveiled a bonus song where Shirt raps over a Minus the Bear track. In August 2019, Shirt put out "Straight Men Suck," examining notions of sexism, homophobia, the #MeToo movement, the struggles of LGBTQ communities, and ongoing issues of sexual harassment. The song used two beats spliced together unofficially-produced by SOPHIE.

=== Film and television ===
Shirt's music has been licensed in various film and television spots. Several of his songs, including "Control" (2012), "Come Home With Me" (2013), and "We Back" (2015) have appeared in television series such as Ringer, CSI: NY, and CSI. "Southside Phantom" (2012), also known as "Phantom (Redux)" (2012) produced by Maker, appeared on HBO's Silicon Valley soundtrack, released on Mass Appeal Records in 2017, as well as in 2019 film Stuber.

Shirt's "On Top" (2011), has appeared in a GoPro video, was featured in the movie Moto 6, and in the 2014 MLB video game, MLB 14: The Show. Most recently, it was named one of the Triple J's Top 100 Songs Of The Decade.

=== Video ===
Shirt has explored the medium of video, collaborating on a number of video works and captured performances. 24 Frames (Movie Night) (2011), features a song written using the titles of one-hundred twenty films, released as a one-shot performance filmed through the Angelika Film Center in Soho. In Queens Cat (2014), Shirt is seen rapping while holding a tabby cat, before placing the cat into the back of an SUV. In the video For The Record (2011), Shirt is depicted hanging upside down with a naked woman in a basement smoking a cigar. The clip was directed by Derek Pike and is said to have been conceived after the artist received encouragement from Jay Electronica following an interaction on Twitter. The video for Automatic (2013) features a slideshow of images put together by Shirt, as does the video for Bengal Tiger (2014). Cuba (2015) is a work of video assemblage which appears to be inspired by Walter Benjamin’s Arcades Project. In Queens To Hollywood (2015), Shirt appropriates footage from the artist Seth Price. The video for 180 Grams (2018) was filmed by Everett Steward at Third Man pressing plant in Cass Corridor, Detroit, Michigan. In it, Third Man employees are seen putting together the Pure Beauty album on vinyl. Flight Home (2018), the first video released after the announcement that Shirt had signed to Third Man Records, features a performance of the rapper performing on top of a box truck hand-painted with the Nike and adidas logos as it drives through Manhattan. Woman is God (2018) was filmed by Shirt in Freetown, Sierra Leone while the artist spent ten days "exploring the region, having conversations, and witnessing first hand the complexities and perseverance of its people and land."

=== Performance ===
In early 2019, as part of the group show Of Color in Zurich, Switzerland, Shirt rapped at the Vernissage inside the main gallery. In 2016, Shirt debuted the song "Summer Not Coming" by playing the record from a speaker on the back of an F-150 pickup truck being driven around New York City. In 2018, at the invitation of curator Silvia Guerra, for the group show Metaphoria III, which took place at the exhibition center Centquatre-Paris, Shirt performed Theory (2015) for the first time since the work was released. In November 2019, Shirt debuted The Hardest Verse You Ever Heard (2019) a silent rap performance in the Mies van der Rohe-room of the Seagram Building as part of +POOL's annual NYC gala. In February 2020, Shirt performed the work The Fine Art of Rap (2020) at Royal College of Art in London.

== Art practice ==
=== Approach ===
Much of Shirt's visual work makes allusions to and shares concerns with minimalism and post-minimal art, but with added Duchampian references to Black and Brown people in American society.

=== Clothing ===
Shirt has designed conceptual clothing lines, including, in 2015, a t-shirt he made combining the Nike and Adidas logos which resulted in Nike sending him a cease and desist letter. He did not stop producing the unofficial collaboration line, instead making embroidered and accessory items and releasing limited pieces available free inside Nike and Adidas flagship stores in NYC. Jeff Staple called the project "genius."

=== Internet art ===
On February 6, 2014, Shirt "faked the NY Times," linking his audience to the website nytimes.la, a now-defunct website designed by the artist to mirror the real New York Times site. The front page linked to an article on Shirt, "Let Me Break Down The Scene in The City For You," purported to have been written by NY Times hip-hop music editor Jon Caramanica. When word spread that the website was a fake and actually an artwork, it went viral, spawning several real press hits.
