= Holdin On (Flume song) =

Single by Flume

from the album Flume
- Released: 9 November 2012
- Recorded: 2012
- Genre: Electronic
- Length: 2:36
- Label: Future Classic
- Composer: Harley Streten
- Lyricist: Otis Redding
- Producer: Flume

Flume singles chronology
"Sleepless" (2012)	"Holdin On" (2012)	"Drop the Game" (2013)

"Holdin On" is a song by Australian DJ and producer Flume from his self-titled debut studio album. It was released on 9 November 2012 and reached its peak of number 17 in Australia in March 2013 and was certified 2× Platinum.

The track was nominated for Song of the Year at the ARIA Music Awards of 2013 but lost to "Resolution" by Matt Corby. The Joe Nappa directed music video was nominated for Best Video.

The track won the Best Independent Dance/Electronica Single and was nominated for Best Independent Single/EP at the Australian Independent Record Label awards of 2013. It also came in at number four in the Triple J Hottest 100, 2012.

== Music video ==
The music video was directed by Joe Nappa and released on 6 March 2013.

== Charts ==
=== Weekly charts ===
Chart (2013)	Peak position
Australia (ARIA)	17
New Zealand (Recorded Music NZ)	22

=== Year-end charts ===
Chart (2013)	Rank
Australia (ARIA)	52
Australian Artists (ARIA)	7

== Certifications ==
Region	Certification	Certified units/sales
Australia (ARIA)	2× Platinum	140,000^{^}
New Zealand (RMNZ)	3× Platinum	90,000^{‡}
^{^} Shipments figures based on certification alone.^{‡} Sales+streaming figures based on certification alone.
