= Little Sea =

Australian pop-rock band

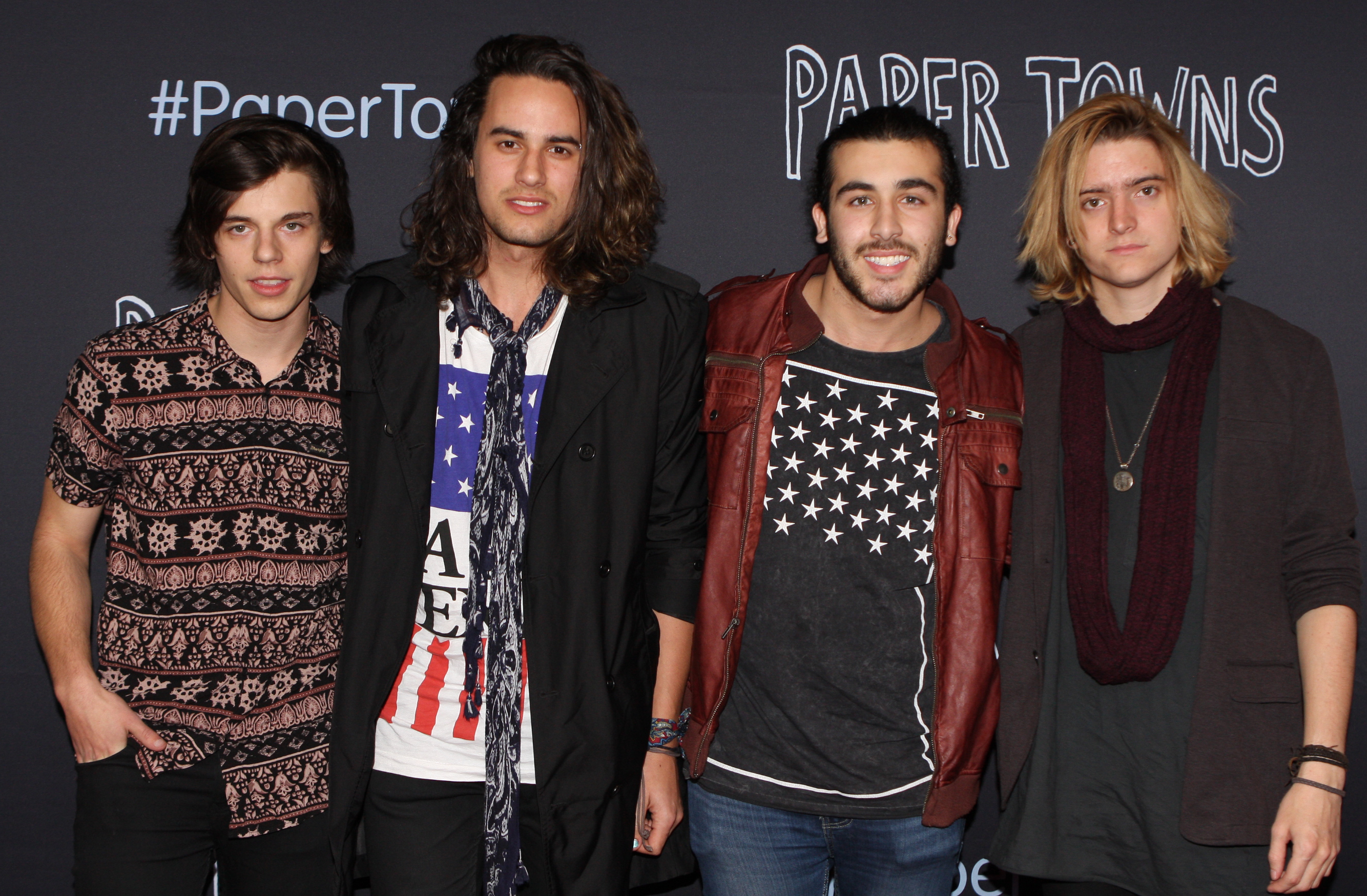

Background information
- Origin: Sydney, Australia
- Genres: Pop
- Years active: 2013–2016
- Labels: Sony Music Australia (2014–2016)
- Members: management: Luke Girgis (2013-2016)
- Past members: Andy Butler (lead vocals, guitar); Dylan Clark (bass, piano); Leighton Cauchi (drums); Oliver Kirby (guitar)
- Website: web.archive.org/web/20150503223209/http://www.littleseamusic.com/

Little Sea were an Australian pop-rock band formed in late 2013, signed to Sony Music Australia. Based in Sydney, Australia, the band consisted of Andy Butler (lead vocals, guitar), Oliver Kirby (guitar), Dylan Clark (bass, piano), and Leighton Cauchi (drums). They released three EPs: Wake the Sun (2014), With You, Without You (2015), and On Loop (2016). They separated on 26 September 2016.

== History ==
The group formed when Andrew Butler and Leighton Cauchi met through mutual friends and played in a progressive metal band. They later formed a new band and were joined by Oliver Kirby in late 2013 and starting posting covers on YouTube. Dylan Clark completed the line-up in February 2014.

The band's first single, "Thank You", was released in May 2014, following which, the band toured Australia, including a support slot for 5 Seconds of Summer at the Enmore Theatre in Sydney and the Tivoli Theatre in Brisbane. In July, the group was signed to Careless Management, part of Be Like Children, a recently founded joint venture between Luke Girgis and Matt Cannings. They debuted at number 1 on the Australian iTunes music chart with their EP Wake the Sun, before touring Australia as main support for international stars 5 Seconds of Summer. This led to the group signing to Universal Music Publishing in August 2014, before being signed to Sony Music Australia record label.

In April 2015, Little Sea joined the Australian national Amplify tour, which also featured YouTube acts Troye Sivan, Connor Franta, Andrea Russett, Jai Waetford, and Jamie's World, among others.

In 2015, the band released the single "Change for Love" along with an EP, With You Without You. The EP consists of 6 tracks: "Red Lights", "Change for Love", "I Don't Wanna Leave", "Friends", an acoustic version of "I Don't Wanna Leave" and "Back to You". On 1 July 2015, Little Sea began their Australian headline tour.

On 16 September 2016, the band released the EP On Loop. Shortly afterwards, on 26 September 2016, the band announced their breakup on all of their social medias.

== Discography ==
=== Extended plays ===
Year	Details	Chart positions
Year	Details	AUS
2014	Wake the Sun: Released: 18 November 2014; Label: Self-released (Independent)	—
2015	With You Without You: Released: 26 June 2015; Label: Sony	—
2016	On Loop: Released: 12 September 2016; Label: Little Sea Galactic Enterprises Pty Ltd	

=== Singles ===
Year	Title	Chart positions	Album
Year	Title	AUS	Album
2014	"Thank You"	—	Wake the Sun EP
2014	"The Lucky Ones"	—	Wake the Sun EP
2015	"Change for Love"	46	With You Without You EP
2016	"Cut It Out" "Revolve"		On Loop EP

== Awards and nominations ==
=== Channel V ===
Year	Award	Result
2014	Oz Artist of the Year	Nominated
