= Breezeblocks (song) =

Single by Alt-J

from the album An Awesome Wave
- Released: 18 May 2012
- Recorded: 2011
- Genre: Indie pop; art rock
- Length: 3:47
- Label: Infectious
- Songwriters: Joe Newman; Gus Unger-Hamilton; Gwilym Sainsbury; Thom Green
- Producer: Charlie Andrew

Alt-J singles chronology
"Matilda" (2012)	"Breezeblocks" (2012)	"Tessellate" (2012)

"Breezeblocks" is a song by British indie rock band Alt-J from their debut studio album An Awesome Wave (2012). The song was released on 18 May 2012 as the album's second single. The song was written by Joe Newman, Gus Unger-Hamilton, Gwil Sainsbury, and Thom Green, and produced by Charlie Andrew. It reached the top ten in the UK Indie and US Alternative charts, and was voted into third place in Australian radio station Triple J's Hottest 100 of 2012, behind "Thrift Shop" and "Little Talks".

== Songwriting ==
According to Newman, writing began after he read the warning label on an aerosol can, which read: "may contain traces... of something that may be flammable", and inspired the lyric "she may contain the urge to run away", a part of the song's refrain. Newman stated in an interview that "[Breezeblocks] is about liking someone who you want so much that you want to hurt yourself and them, as well." Newman also stated that Breezeblocks, like the rest of An Awesome Wave, was partially inspired by the 1963 children's book Where the Wild Things Are.

The song's lyrics reference Where the Wild Things Are: Newman sings "Do you know where the wild things go?" and the song ends with the repeated refrain "Please don't go, I'll eat you whole / I love you so;" Maurice Sendak's words are: "Oh, please don't go – we'll eat you up – we love you so!"

== Music video ==
A music video was created to accompany the release of the song. Directed by Ellis Bahl and starring actors Jonathan Dwyer, Jessica DiGiovanni, and Eleanore Pienta, it is the band's first official music video.

The video features a violent fight between a male character and a female character apparently played in reverse. Newman explained in an interview: "Our video for this track has a really different message, and yet it worked really well with the song. It's quite a weird one; people aren't sure what's going on. We liked that you might have to go back and watch it a second time to figure out what is happening."

The video aired for the first time on YouTube on 23 March 2012. As of June 2025, it has over 290 million views. The video won at the UK Music Video Awards for "Best Alternative Video" on 8 November 2012.

== Track listing ==
7" single

1. "Breezeblocks" – 3:47
2. Tom Vek's Remix – 3:59

Digital download – single

1. "Breezeblocks" – 3:47

Digital download – remixes

1. "Breezeblocks" – 3:47
2. Tom Vek's Remix – 5:18
3. B-Ju Remix – 3:59
4. Rockdaworld Remix – 4:41

== Credits and personnel ==
- Lead vocals – Alt-J (∆)
- Producers – Charlie Andrew
- Lyrics – Joe Newman, Gus Unger-Hamilton, Gwilym Sainsbury, Thom Green

== Chart performance ==
=== Weekly charts ===
Chart (2012–13)	Peak position
Australia (ARIA)	41
UK Singles (Official Charts)	75
UK Indie (Official Charts)	6
US Bubbling Under Hot 100 (Billboard)	21
US Hot Rock & Alternative Songs (Billboard)	16
US Alternative Airplay (Billboard)	9
US Rock & Alternative Airplay (Billboard)	26

=== Year-end charts ===
Chart (2013)	Position
US Hot Rock Songs (Billboard)	36
US Alternative Songs (Billboard)	29

== Certifications ==
Region	Certification	Certified units/sales
Australia (ARIA)	4× Platinum	280,000^{‡}
Denmark (IFPI Danmark)	Gold	45,000^{‡}
Italy (FIMI)	Gold	25,000^{‡}
Spain (Promusicae)	Gold	30,000^{‡}
United Kingdom (BPI)	2× Platinum	1,200,000^{‡}
United States (RIAA)	3× Platinum	3,000,000^{‡}
^{‡} Sales+streaming figures based on certification alone.

== Radio and release history ==
Region	Date	Format	Label
United Kingdom	18 May 2012	Digital download – single	Infectious
United Kingdom	18 May 2012	Digital download – remixes	Infectious
