= Matilda (Alt-J song) =

Single by Alt-J

from the album An Awesome Wave
- B-side: "Fitzpleasure"
- Released: 10 January 2012
- Recorded: 2009
- Genre: Indie folk; progressive folk; art rock
- Length: 3:48
- Label: Infectious
- Songwriter(s): Joe Newman, Gus Unger-Hamilton, Gwilym Sainsbury and Thom Green
- Producer(s): Charlie Andrew

Alt-J singles chronology
"Bloodflood" (2011)	"Matilda" (2012)	"Breezeblocks" (2012)

"Matilda" is a song by British rock band Alt-J from their debut studio album An Awesome Wave, released on 10 January 2012 as a digital download. It was released as a split single with "Fitzpleasure" on 24 February as a digital download and on 10" triangle-shaped vinyl. It was written by Joe Newman, Gus Unger-Hamilton, Gwilym Sainsbury and Thom Green and produced by Charlie Andrew. The song relates to the movie Léon (1994), specifically the relationship between the main character (a hitman) and a young girl called Mathilda. The opening lines are the last ones said by the main character (portrayed by Jean Reno) in the film. The band would later release the song "Leon", a tribute to the main character of the film. The cover image is a photograph of Ball's Pyramid.

The song has a YouTube video featuring imagery of human faces which steadily morph so that every so often you are looking at a new face. This video contained a self-referential gimmick as at the time of release Alt+J was the shortcut for a YouTube video to rewind 7 seconds which was the perfect amount of time to go from one "finished" facial image to another so you would see a new face each time you pressed it. This no longer is the case as the shortcut is simply J and is now a 10-second skip so it no longer syncs up with the video.

== Track listing ==
Digital download

1. "Matilda" – 3:48

10" single

1. "Matilda" – 3:48
2. "Fitzpleasure" – 3:39

7" single

1. "Matilda" – 3:48
2. "Matilda" (Johnson Somerset Radio Mix)

Digital iTunes EP

1. "Matilda" – 3:48
2. "Fitzpleasure" – 3:39
3. "Matilda" (Remix) – 3:49
4. "Fitzpleasure" (bretonLABS Ghost Remix) – 4:23

== Charts ==
Chart (2012–13)	Peak position
Belgium (Ultratip Bubbling Under Flanders)	59
France (SNEP)	6
UK Singles (OCC)	83
UK Indie (OCC)	7

== Certifications ==
Certifications for Matilda
Region	Certification	Certified units/sales
United Kingdom (BPI)	Silver	200,000^{‡}
^{‡} Sales+streaming figures based on certification alone.

== Release history ==
Region	Date	Format	Label
United Kingdom	10 January 2012	Digital Single	Infectious
United Kingdom	24 February 2012	Digital EP, 10" vinyl	Infectious
United Kingdom	10 December 2012	7" vinyl	Infectious
