= Bloodflood =

Single by Alt-J

from the album An Awesome Wave
- A-side: "Tessellate" (double A-side)
- Released: 13 October 2011
- Genre: Indie rock; indie pop; art rock; experimental rock
- Length: 4:09
- Label: Loud and Quiet
- Songwriter(s): Alt-J
- Producer(s): Charlie Andrew

Alt-J singles chronology
"Bloodflood" (2011)	"Matilda" (2012)

"Bloodflood" is the first single by English indie rock band Alt-J released in October 2011 through Loud and Quiet Recordings on 7" vinyl as a double A-side single with "Tessellate". The single was limited to 300 copies. It was later put on their 2012 debut album An Awesome Wave. A second part called "Bloodflood Pt. II" was recorded for their second album This Is All Yours (2014).

== Lyrics ==
The first line in the song "C-O double M-O-N", in reference to Southampton Common (also mentioned in "Fitzpleasure"), a park in the city centre of Southampton where singer Joe Newman, who wrote the song grew up. "It's about the fear that can happen when you're approached by people that look like they're gonna hit you and it's based in this area, it's called Southampton Common [...]". The song also says the album title An Awesome Wave ("A wave / An awesome wave") which comes from the book American Psycho, with a line in the book saying that relief washes over the character like "an awesome wave".

== Track listing ==
1. "Bloodflood"
2. "Tessellate"
