= I Will Wait =

Single by Mumford & Sons

from the album Babel
- Released: 7 August 2012
- Genre: Indie folk; folk rock; bluegrass
- Length: 4:36 (main/album version); 3:32 (single version)
- Label: Gentlemen of the Road; Island
- Songwriter: Marcus Mumford
- Producer: Markus Dravs

Mumford & Sons singles chronology
"Roll Away Your Stone" (2010)	"I Will Wait" (2012)	"Lover of the Light" (2012)

Alternative cover
- Promotional artwork

"I Will Wait" is a song by British rock band Mumford & Sons. The track was first released in the United States on 7 August 2012 as the lead single from the band's second studio album, Babel (2012). The song sold 153,000 copies in the United States in its first week of release and became their highest-charting song in the US to date, peaking at number 12. It also reached the top ten in the United Kingdom, New Zealand, Irish, Canadian and Scottish national charts and was voted into fifth place in Australian radio station Triple J's Hottest 100 of 2012. The song is playable in the video game Guitar Hero Live, and was featured in The Book of Life covered by Diego Luna.

== Music video ==
The music video was directed by Fred & Nick. It was filmed at Red Rocks Amphitheatre in Morrison, Colorado.

== Critical reception ==
The song has received generally favourable reviews. Grady Smith of Entertainment Weekly gave the song a positive review, saying how the song "hearkens back to their Grammy-nomination-festooned single "The Cave" with its shouted refrain, triumphant horns, a driving kick drum, and an earnest lyric about a relationship so perfect it has Marcus Mumford kneeling down in reverence, raising his hands, and wishing for his mind to be "freed from the lies."" Stephanie Middleton of The Celebrity Cafe said, "With untouched vocals and harmonies, the boys manage to create yet another genuine Mumford & Sons track."

Katie Hasty of HitFix gave the song a B+, saying "Marcus is a softie, but he's got a problem with repetition," but also said "they bring it home when they jump up an octave and beat the hell out of the chorus." She concluded with, "This song could be really huge." Liv Carter of Urban Country News awarded the song a 'thumbs-up'. Reviewing the song after it started receiving airplay at country radio, she called it "a perfect piece of folk-rock that more than deserves to be introduced to the wider country radio audience." Rolling Stone magazine named the song the 13th best song of 2012.

== Track listing ==
Digital download
No.	Title	Length
1.	"I Will Wait"	4:36

2013 Brit Awards
No.	Title	Length
1.	"I Will Wait (Live from the BRITs)"	4:48

== Awards ==
Year	Organization	Award	Result
2013	Grammy Award	Best Rock Performance	Nominated
2013	Grammy Award	Best Rock Song	Nominated
2013	MTV Video Music Award	Best Rock Video	Nominated

== Charts ==
=== Weekly charts ===
Chart (2012–2013)	Peak position
Australia (ARIA)	23
Austria (Ö3 Austria Top 40)	27
Belgium (Ultratop 50 Flanders)	14
Belgium (Ultratip Bubbling Under Wallonia)	11
Canada Hot 100 (Billboard)	9
Europe (Euro Digital Songs)	18
France (SNEP)	93
Germany (GfK)	53
Ireland (IRMA)	7
Japan Hot 100 (Billboard)	25
Netherlands (Single Top 100)	34
New Zealand (Recorded Music NZ)	4
Norway (VG-lista)	20
Scottish Singles Sales (Official Charts)	9
Spain (Promusicae)	48
Sweden (Sverigetopplistan)	50
Switzerland (Schweizer Hitparade)	39
UK Singles (Official Charts)	12
US Billboard Hot 100	12
US Adult Contemporary (Billboard)	11
US Adult Pop Airplay (Billboard)	1
US Country Airplay (Billboard)	37
US Pop Airplay (Billboard)	16
US Hot Rock & Alternative Songs (Billboard)	1
US Rock & Alternative Airplay (Billboard)	1

=== Year-end charts ===
Chart (2012)	Position
Australia (ARIA)	90
UK Singles (OCC)	116
US Hot Rock & Alternative Songs (Billboard)	19

Chart (2013)	Position
Australia (ARIA)	95
Canada (Canadian Hot 100)	26
UK Singles (OCC)	89
US Billboard Hot 100	52
US Adult Contemporary (Billboard)	29
US Adult Top 40 (Billboard)	6
US Hot Rock & Alternative Songs (Billboard)	12
US Rock Airplay (Billboard)	7

== Certifications ==
Certifications for "I Will Wait"
Region	Certification	Certified units/sales
Australia (ARIA)	3× Platinum	210,000^{^}
Brazil (Pro-Música Brasil)	Platinum	60,000^{‡}
Canada (Music Canada)	5× Platinum	400,000^{*}
Denmark (IFPI Danmark)	Gold	45,000^{‡}
Germany (BVMI)	Gold	150,000^{‡}
Italy (FIMI)	Gold	25,000^{‡}
New Zealand (RMNZ)	5× Platinum	150,000^{‡}
Norway (IFPI Norway)	2× Platinum	20,000^{*}
Spain (Promusicae)	Gold	30,000^{‡}
United Kingdom (BPI)	4× Platinum	2,400,000^{‡}
United States (RIAA)	3× Platinum	3,000,000^{‡}
^{*} Sales figures based on certification alone.^{^} Shipments figures based on certification alone.^{‡} Sales+streaming figures based on certification alone.

== Release history ==
Region	Date	Format
United States	7 August 2012	Digital download
United Kingdom	9 September 2012	Digital download
