= Lover of the Light =

Single by Mumford & Sons

from the album Babel
- Released: 5 November 2012
- Recorded: 2011–2012
- Genre: Indie folk
- Length: 5:14
- Label: Island
- Songwriters: Ted Dwane, Ben Lovett, Marcus Mumford and Winston Marshall
- Producer: Markus Dravs

Mumford & Sons singles chronology
"I Will Wait" (2012)	"Lover of the Light" (2012)	"Whispers in the Dark" (2013)

"Lover of the Light" is a song performed by British rock band Mumford & Sons, released as the second single from their second studio album Babel (2012). It was released on 5 November 2012 as a digital download. The song was written by Mumford & Sons and produced by Markus Dravs.

== Music video ==
A music video to accompany the release of "Lover of the Light" was first released onto YouTube on 4 November 2012 at a total length of five minutes and fifty-five seconds. It was co-directed by British actor Idris Elba and British screenwriter Dan Cadan. The video does not feature the band, it tells the story of a blind man (Elba) who puts aside his cane and runs free, ending with him at the edge of a cliff.

== Track listing ==
Digital download
No.	Title	Length
1.	"Lover of the Light"	5:14

== Charts ==
=== Weekly charts ===
Chart (2012–2013)	Peak position
Belgium (Ultratip Bubbling Under Flanders)	3
Canada Hot 100 (Billboard)	94
Israel International Airplay (Media Forest)	10
Netherlands (Single Top 100)	94
Switzerland Airplay (Schweizer Hitparade)	74
UK Singles (Official Charts Company)	144
US Billboard Hot 100	97
US Hot Rock & Alternative Songs (Billboard)	15
US Adult Alternative Airplay (Billboard)	1
US Adult Pop Airplay (Billboard)	36
US Alternative Airplay (Billboard)	4
US Rock & Alternative Airplay (Billboard)	4

=== Year-end charts ===
Chart (2013)	Position
US Hot Rock Songs (Billboard)	40
US Adult Alternative Songs (Billboard)	8
US Alternative Songs (Billboard)	23
US Rock Airplay (Billboard)	17

== Certifications ==
Region	Certification	Certified units/sales
United Kingdom (BPI)	Silver	200,000^{‡}
^{‡} Sales+streaming figures based on certification alone.

== Release history ==
Region	Date	Format	Label
United Kingdom	5 November 2012	Digital download	Island Records
United States	December 18, 2012	Radio airplay	Glassnote Records
