= Smythson =

British manufacturer of luxury goods

Frank Smythson Limited
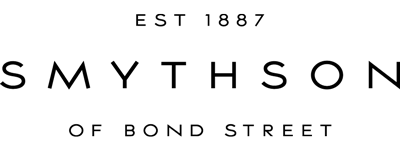

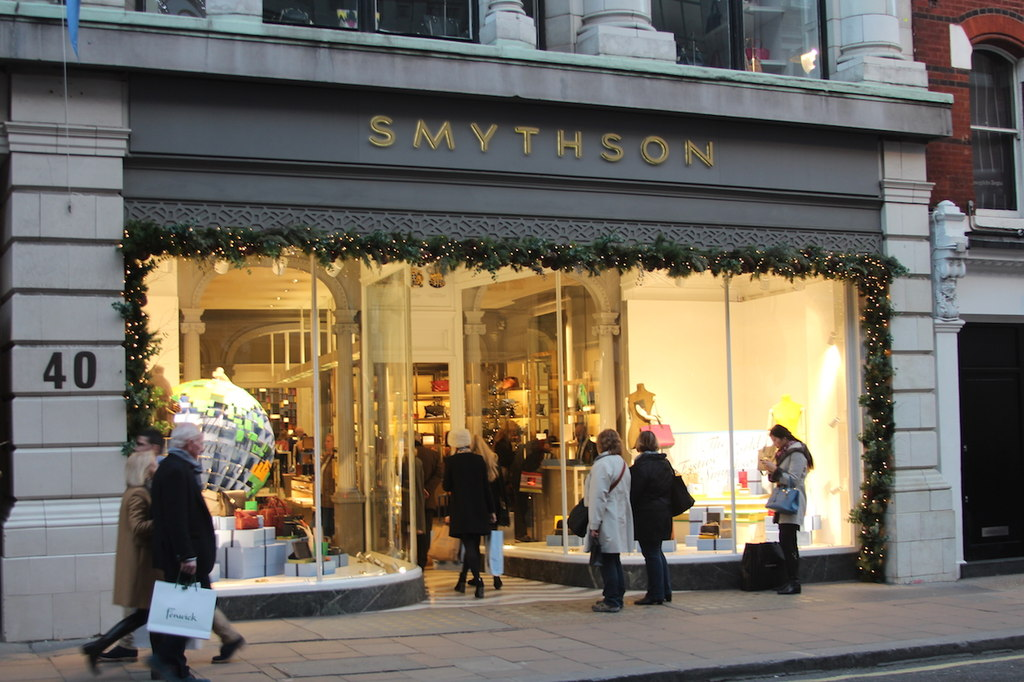
- Shop on New Bond Street, London
- Type: Private
- Industry: Luxury goods
- Founded: 1887; 139 years ago
- Founder: Frank John Smythson
- Headquarters: London, UK
- Area served: Worldwide
- Key people: Jacques Bahbout (Chairman); Stefano Giacomelli (Deputy Chairman); Luc Goidadin (Creative Director)
- Products: Stationery and accessories
- Owner: Oakley Capital
- Website: smythson.com

An example of Smythson's work: an engraved, monogrammed calling card

Frank Smythson Limited, commonly known as Smythson (/smaɪθsən/), is a British manufacturer and retailer of luxury stationery, leather goods, diaries, and fashion products based in London, England. The company's founder, Frank John Smythson, was born in 1847 at Holborn and was a son of Marcus Alfred Smythson, a professor of music. He opened his first store on 29 September 1887 at 133 New Bond Street in London. Smythson's flagship store, which closed in 2024, was located nearby at 131-132 New Bond Street.

Smythson's clients have included the British royal family, many UK prime ministers and other politicians, Sir Edmund Hillary, Madonna and Grace Kelly. In 1908, the company created the first 'Featherweight' diary, enabling diaries to be carried about. Most of the company's leather goods are now made in Italy.

== History ==
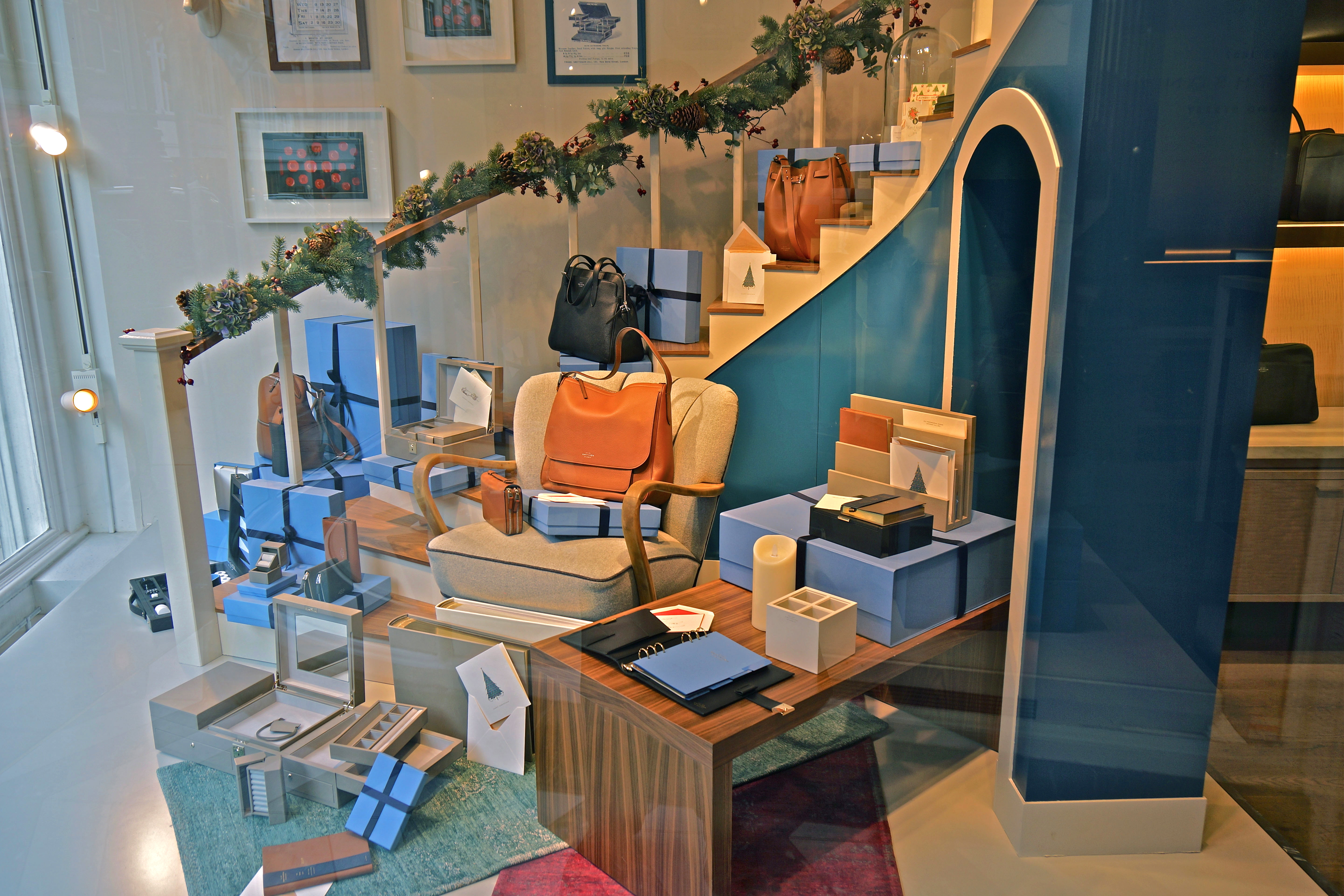
Window display of New Bond Street shop

In the 1950s, the John Menzies Group acquired Smythson, which was also operating under the name 'Pendragon' at the time. In 1998, Smythson's then managing director Sarah Elton led a management buyout backed by a private investor. Since then, the business has grown and the company is now operating outlets in the UK, US and France, as well as online through their website. In 2004, Smythson recorded £12 million in sales revenues. During the 2000s, its creative director was Samantha Cameron, wife of David Cameron.

In early 2005, Smythson shareholders appointed Cavendish Corporate Finance Limited to advise on the disposal of their stake in the business. Besides maximising value for themselves, the shareholders wanted to find a buyer who would protect the heritage of the brand and offer the management team the opportunity to continue to grow.

Kelso Place Asset Management and King Street Partners, backed by a consortium of high-net-worth individuals, were identified as the preferred bidders. Sarah Elton commented that she was satisfied with the deal.

In December 2009, the company was sold for £18 million to Greenwill SA. Jacques Bahbout became Chairman of Smythson. In 2021, Stefano Giacomelli was appointed Deputy Chairman.

Smythson has collaborated with artists and designers such as Holly Fulton (2010), Jonathan Saunders (2011) and Quentin Jones (2014).

On 1 July 2025, it was announced the company had been acquired by Oakley Capital, a private equity firm owned by Peter Dubens. The price of the sale was not disclosed.

== Locations ==
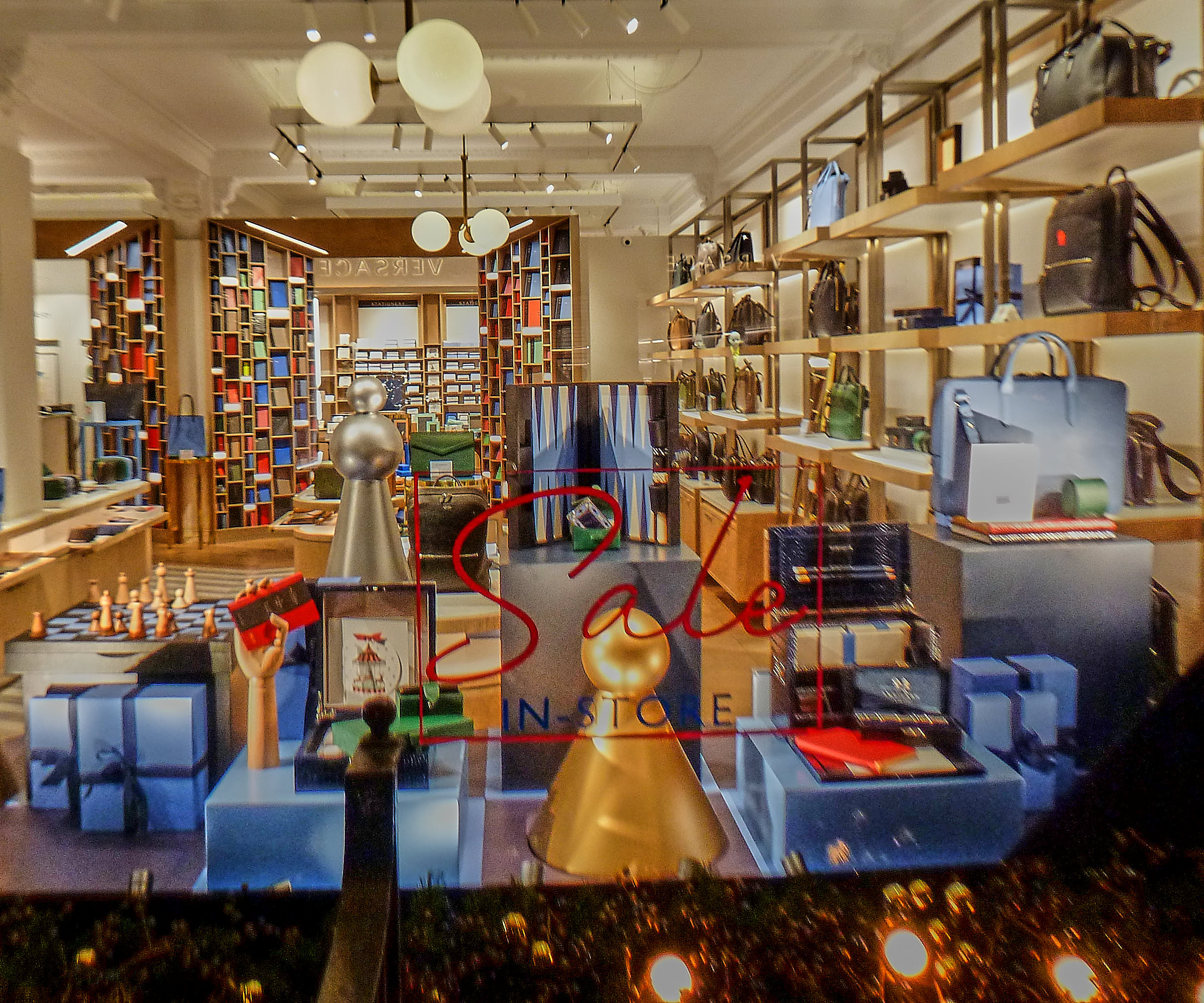
New Bond Street shop

In the United Kingdom, Smythson has London boutiques on Sloane Street, as well as concessions in Harrods, Selfridges and Heathrow Airport Terminals 4 and 5. The company had a flagship store on New Bond Street, which hosted a small archive collection dedicated to notable users of Smythson products throughout the brand's history. However, the store closed its doors in April 2024, three months after the firm closed its boutique in Westbourne Grove.

Smythson's other international location is at Le Bon Marché in Paris.
