= Flume (album) =

Studio album by Flume
- Released: 9 November 2012
- Genre: Wonky; electronica; experimental; downtempo
- Length: 49:53
- Label: Future Classic
- Producer: Harley Streten

Flume chronology
Flume (2012)	Lockjaw EP (2013)

Deluxe edition cover

Singles from Flume
- 1. "On Top" Released: June 2012; 2. "Sleepless" Released: September 2012; 3. "Holdin On" Released: November 2012

Flume is the debut studio album by the Australian electronic musician of the same name. It was released on 9 November 2012 by Future Classic. The deluxe edition of the album was released on 12 November 2013.

At the J Awards of 2013, the album won Australian Album of the Year.

== Critical reception ==
Professional ratings
Aggregate scores
Source	Rating
Metacritic	73/100
Review scores
Source	Rating
AllMusic	3.5/5 stars
Drowned in Sound	6/10
NME	7/10
Pitchfork	7.4/10
PopMatters	4/5 stars
Q	4/5 stars
This is Fake DIY	8/10

Upon its release, Flume received generally positive reviews. At Metacritic, which assigns a normalised rating out of 100 to reviews from mainstream critics, the album holds an average score of 73, indicating "generally favorable reviews".

== Track listing ==
All tracks are written by Harley Streten unless otherwise noted.

Flume track listing
No.	Title	Writer(s)	Length
1.	"Sintra"	Harley Streten	2:35
2.	"Holdin On"	Streten; Otis Redding	2:34
3.	"Left Alone" (featuring Chet Faker)	Streten; Nicholas Murphy	3:29
4.	"Sleepless" (featuring Jezzabell Doran)	Streten; Jesse Sewell; Jezzebell Doran	3:29
5.	"On Top" (featuring T.Shirt)	Streten; George Tryfonos	3:51
6.	"Stay Close"	Streten	2:56
7.	"Insane" (featuring Moon Holiday)	Streten; Alexandra Ward	3:33
8.	"Change"	Streten	2:30
9.	"Ezra"	Streten	3:37
10.	"More Than You Thought"	Streten	4:05
11.	"Space Cadet"	Streten	2:12
12.	"Bring You Down" (featuring George Maple)	Streten; Jessica Higgs	4:38
13.	"Warm Thoughts"	Streten	3:48
14.	"What You Need"	Streten	4:10
15.	"Star Eyes"	Streten	2:26

Deluxe edition bonus disc
No.	Title	Writer(s)	Original artist	Length
1.	"Intro" (featuring Stalley)	Streten; Kyle Myricks		3:54
2.	"Space Cadet" (featuring Ghostface Killah and Autre Ne Veut)	Streten; Dennis Coles; Arthur Ashin		1:57
3.	"Insane" (featuring Moon Holiday and Killer Mike)	Streten; Ward; Michael Render		2:07
4.	"Stay Close" (featuring Alexander Spit, Boldy James, and Aaron Cohen)	Streten; Alexander Spitzmueller; James Clay Jones III; Aaron Cohen		2:44
5.	"Holdin' On" (featuring Freddie Gibbs)	Streten; Otis; Angus Stuart; Luke Dubber		2:47
6.	"Change" (featuring How to Dress Well)	Streten; Thomas Krell		2:38
7.	"Warm Thoughts" (featuring Grande Marshall and Goldie Glo)	Streten; Grande Marshall; Goldie Glo		2:45
8.	"Sleepless" (featuring Twin Shadow and Jezzabell Doran)	Streten; Sewell; George Lewis Jr.; Doran		1:49
9.	"HyperParadise (Flume's Mixtape Version)" (featuring M.O.P.)		Hermitude	1:19
10.	"You & Me (Flume Remix)" (featuring Eliza Doolittle)		Disclosure	4:42
11.	"HyperParadise (Flume Remix)"		Hermitude	4:26
12.	"A Baru in New York (Flume Soundtrack Version)"		Yolanda Be Cool	5:37
13.	"Zimbabwe (Flume Remix)"		New Navy	3:33
14.	"Sleepless (Shlohmo Remix)" (featuring Jezzabell Doran)			5:17
15.	"Holdin' On (123MRK Remix)"			3:40
16.	"Left Alone (Ta-Ku Remix)" (featuring Chet Faker)			4:01
17.	"Holdin' On (Hermitude Remix)"			3:46
18.	"Insane (L D R U Remix)" (featuring Moon Holiday)			3:50
19.	"The Greatest View" (featuring Isabella Manfredi) (iTunes bonus track)			4:02

== Personnel ==
- Harley Streten – production
- Nick Murphy – composition (track 3)
- Jezzabell Doran – composition (track 4)
- Jessica Higgs – composition
- Jesse Sewell – composition
- George Tryfonos – composition
- Alex Ward – composition
- Jay Ryves – art direction
- Michael Zito – artwork

== Charts ==
=== Weekly charts ===
Weekly chart performance for Flume
Chart (2013)	Peak position
Australian Albums (ARIA)	1
Australian Independent Label Albums	1
Belgian Albums (Ultratop Flanders)	139
Belgian Albums (Ultratop Wallonia)	180
Dutch Albums (Album Top 100)	67
New Zealand Albums (RMNZ)	12
US Top Dance Albums (Billboard)	12

=== Year-end charts ===
Year-end chart performance for Flume
Chart (2012)	Position
Australian Albums Chart	57
Australian Artist Albums Chart	14
Chart (2013)	Position
Australian Albums Chart	11
Australian Artist Albums Chart	1
Chart (2014)	Position
Australian Albums Chart	67

=== Decade-end charts ===
Decade-end chart performance for Flume
Chart (2010–2019)	Position
Australian Albums (ARIA)	38
Australian Artist Albums (ARIA)	5

== Certifications ==
Certifications for Flume
Region	Certification	Certified units/sales
Australia (ARIA)	2× Platinum	140,000^{^}
New Zealand (RMNZ)	Gold	7,500^{^}
^{^} Shipments figures based on certification alone.
