= Quentin Jones =

English artist (born 1983)

- Born: 3 December 1983 (age 42)
- Occupation: Artist

Quentin Jones (born 3 December 1983) is a mixed-media artist born in London and is based in New York. She is known for her short, black and white, surrealist videos.

== Early life and career ==
Jones (born in Toronto, Canada) studied philosophy at Cambridge and received a master's in illustration from Central Saint Martins in 2010. The daughter of architect Edward Jones, Jones also has a background in modeling. Jones's style montages images with graffiti-style collages. Themes in her work include contemporary beauty, fashion, and femininity. Her process begins with a sketching phase, so her participants can see her ideas, before making and painting props. Jones has said that her favorite part is adding collaged elements in post-production. Jones has worked with brands including Chanel, Victoria Beckham, Louis Vuitton, Target, Kenzo, Holly Fulton, Hoss Intropia, and Smythson. In 2013, The Hospital Club shortlisted Jones among the 30 most influential people in fashion.

She is married and has two sons, living in London.
