= Whispers in the Dark (Mumford & Sons song) =

Single by Mumford & Sons

from the album Babel
- Released: 11 March 2013
- Recorded: 2011–2012
- Genre: Indie folk
- Length: 3:15
- Label: Island
- Songwriters: Ted Dwane, Ben Lovett, Marcus Mumford and Winston Marshall
- Producer: Markus Dravs

Mumford & Sons singles chronology
| "Lover of the Light" (2012) | "Whispers in the Dark" (2013) | "Babel" (2013) |

"Whispers in the Dark" is a song performed by British folk rock band Mumford & Sons, released as the third single from their second studio album Babel (2012). It was released on 11 March 2013 as a digital download. The song was written by Mumford & Sons and produced by Markus Dravs.

== Music video ==
A music video to accompany the release of "Whispers in the Dark" was first released onto YouTube on 10 March 2013 at a total length of three minutes and nineteen seconds.

== Track listing ==
Digital download
| No. | Title | Length |
|---|---|---|
| 1. | "Whispers in the Dark" | 3:15 |

== Chart performance ==
=== Weekly charts ===
| Chart (2013) | Peak position |
|---|---|
| Belgium (Ultratip Bubbling Under Flanders) | 16 |
| Switzerland Airplay (Schweizer Hitparade) | 93 |
| UK Singles (Official Charts Company) | 195 |
| US Billboard Hot 100 | 81 |
| US Hot Rock & Alternative Songs (Billboard) | 11 |

=== Year-end charts ===
| Chart (2013) | Position |
|---|---|
| US Hot Rock Songs (Billboard) | 94 |

== Personnel ==
- Marcus Mumford-Acoustic guitar, Vocals
- Ted Dwane-Bass, vocals
- Winston "Willie" Marshall-Banjo, vocals
- Ben Lovett-Piano, vocals, Electric Guitar (live maybe recording)

== Release history ==
| Region | Date | Format | Label |
|---|---|---|---|
| United Kingdom | 11 March 2013 | Digital download | Island Records |
