= Sleepless (Flume song) =

2011 single by Flume

Single by Flume featuring Antony for Cleopatra
- B-side: "Over You"; "Paper Thin"
- Released: 1 August 2011
- Recorded: 2011
- Genre: Electronic; downtempo
- Length: 3:28
- Label: Future Classic
- Songwriters: Harley Streten; Jezzabell Doran; Jesse Sewell; L George

Flume singles chronology
"Sleepless" (2011)	"On Top" (2012)

"Sleepless" is the debut single from Australian musician Flume. The track features Sydney based duo Antony for Cleopatra and was released on 1 August 2011.

Flume was discovered and signed in 2011 following an original artists competition managed by the Australian record company Future Classic. He submitted the tracks "Sleepless", "Over You" and "Paper Thin", but came second in the competition, after which he was picked up by Future Classic, and the singles were subsequently released.

== Track listing ==
1. "Sleepless" – 3:28
2. "Over You" – 3:26
3. "Paper Thin" – 2:56

== 2012 version ==
"Sleepless"

Single by Flume featuring Jezzabell Doran

from the album Flume
- B-side: "Remixes"
- Released: 24 September 2012
- Recorded: 2012
- Genre: Electronic
- Length: 3:29
- Label: Future Classic
- Songwriters: Harley Streten; Jezzabell Doran; Jesse Sewell; L George

Flume singles chronology
"On Top" (2012)	"Sleepless" (2012)	"Holdin On" (2012)

"Sleepless" was released as the second single from his debut studio album, Flume. The track reached its peak of number 53 in Australia on 4 February 2013 and was certified Gold.

== Music video ==
The music video was directed by Damon Cameron and released on 6 September 2012.

== Track listing ==
- Digital download
1. "Sleepless" – 3:29
- Remixes – Part 1
1. "Sleepless" (Original Mix) – 3:29
2. "Sleepless" (Shlohmo Remix) – 5:17
3. "Sleepless" (Midland Dub) – 6:01
- Remixes – Part 2
1. "Sleepless" (Cosmo's Midnight Mix) – 3:33
2. "Sleepless" (Charles Murdoch Mix) – 4:06

== Charts ==
Chart (2013)	Peak position
Australia (ARIA)	53

== Certifications ==
Region	Certification	Certified units/sales
Australia (ARIA)	Gold	35,000^{^}
^{^} Shipments figures based on certification alone.
