= Babel (Mumford & Sons album) =

Studio album by Mumford & Sons
- Released: 21 September 2012
- Studios: Angelic Studio (Brackley, Northamptonshire); British Grove Studios (London); Eastcote Studios (London); Grangeworks; Last Dollar Studio (Nashville); RAK Studios (London); Studio Soyuz (Paris); The Odgers' Chapel
- Genres: Indie folk; pop
- Length: 52:17
- Labels: Island; Glassnote; Gentlemen of the Road
- Producer: Markus Dravs

Mumford & Sons chronology
Sigh No More (2009)	Babel (2012)	Wilder Mind (2015)

Singles from Babel
- 1. "I Will Wait" Released: 7 August 2012; 2. "Lover of the Light" Released: 5 November 2012; 3. "Whispers in the Dark" Released: 11 March 2013; 4. "Babel" Released: 9 July 2013; 5. "Hopeless Wanderer" Released: 4 August 2013

Babel is the second studio album by British folk rock band Mumford & Sons, released on 21 September 2012, by Island Records. As with their debut album, Sigh No More (2009), the album was produced by Markus Dravs. The vinyl LP version of the record was pressed by United Record Pressing in Nashville, Tennessee.

Upon its release, Babel received generally positive reviews from music critics. The album debuted at number one on both the UK Albums Chart and the US Billboard 200, becoming the fastest-selling album of 2012 in the UK, with over 159,000 copies sold in its first week, and 600,000 first week copies in the US. Babel won Album of the Year at the 55th Grammy Awards.

== Background ==
In late 2010, Mumford & Sons had already begun road-testing new material that they had been working on. Most of these songs, including "Broken Crown" and "Below My Feet", had already been played live on numerous occasions before the album's release. "Not With Haste" was a re-written version of the song "Learn Me Right" which they had performed with Birdy for the soundtrack of the film Brave. Mumford & Sons decided not to change their sound on Babel, which is the follow-up to 2009's highly successful Sigh No More, which elevated them to international fame. They did, however, admit that they purposely took their time to perfect the sound that they had already developed.

On Monday, 16 July 2012 the band's official website announced that their new album Babel would be released in the UK on 24 September, and the following day in the US. A final track list and album art were also revealed, as well as a 30-second promo. Babel was made available for preorder on the band's official website on Monday, 23 July, when it was announced that the album would also be released as a vinyl LP and a deluxe edition with additional tracks.

== Singles ==
The album's official lead single is "I Will Wait". The band premiered the song on Zane Lowe's BBC Radio 1 show on 7 August 2012. On 29 August 2012, Mumford & Sons recorded their live performance of "I Will Wait" at Red Rocks Amphitheatre in Colorado. The performance was released on 9 September as the band's official video for the song.

The album's second single is "Lover of the Light". The music video was released on 7 November and stars actor Idris Elba who also directed the short film. The song was officially released on 3 December 2012.

The third single from the album is "Whispers in the Dark". The music video premiered on 11 March 2013.

The title-track "Babel" is their fourth single off the album. It has already made it into the BBC Radio 1 Playlist's A list.

A music video for the song "Hopeless Wanderer" premiered on 4 August 2013. Directed by Sam Jones, the video features Jason Sudeikis, Jason Bateman, Ed Helms and Will Forte as Marcus Mumford, Winston Marshall, Ben Lovett and Ted Dwane, respectively. The video was released on both Vevo and YouTube; within less than four days on the latter site, the video already had over 3 million views.

== Critical reception ==
Professional ratings
Aggregate scores
Source	Rating
AnyDecentMusic?	5.6/10
Metacritic	63/100
Review scores
Source	Rating
AllMusic	3/5 stars
The A.V. Club	B−
Entertainment Weekly	A−
The Guardian	3/5 stars
The Independent	3/5 stars
Mojo	4/5 stars
NME	6/10
Q	3/5 stars
Rolling Stone	3.5/5 stars
Spin	4/10

Babel received generally positive reviews from music critics. At Metacritic, which assigns a normalized rating out of 100 to reviews from mainstream critics, the album received an average score of 63, based on 33 reviews, which indicates "generally favorable reviews". Mojo magazine found it to be "more than just a decent nu-folk album," but also "a great pop album". Clash called it a "rip-roaring record" with catchy hooks and "not much depth," but "some good tunes". Davis Inman of The A.V. Club found the entire album "sonically impeccable", even though Mumford's imagery seems "like go-to words in a lazy songwriter's starved lexicon." Q called it an "ultimately comfortable listening, befitting folk sounds of a resolutely un-freak variety." Melissa Maerz of Entertainment Weekly viewed that the music will convince listeners who cannot appreciate "lyrics this earnest", as the band "has mastered the emotional gut-punch of quiet/loud dynamics". Kelly O'Brien of State praised the band's "unrestrained ardour and zealous poetry", and wrote that they "manage to play loudly and boisterously, without ever making the descent into cacophony." Will Hermes of Rolling Stone cited the band's lyrics as the album's defining characteristic, writing that they use "church flavor" to "supersize and complicate love songs." Magnet magazine found Babel to be a "more subtle and accomplished album" than Sigh No More.

In a mixed review, Kevin Perry of NME called it an "average", "middle of the road" album and "a retooled, streamlined adaptation" of Sigh No More. Greg Kot of the Chicago Tribune found its songwriting "pedestrian" and felt that the "loud-quiet-loud dynamic" of both the singing and the music "becomes repetitive." AllMusic's James Christopher Monger felt that its "incredibly spirited" songs "bark much louder than they bite" and found most of the album "delivering its everyman message with the kind of calculated spiritual fervor that comes from having to adapt to the festival masses as opposed to the smaller club crowds." Chuck Eddy of Spin panned the band's "U2-style evangelism" and wrote that they "don't seem remotely musically curious." Andy Gill of The Independent headlined his review "A Heart-to-Heart with the Nu-Folk Romantics" and accused Mumford of "wallowing self-absorption" while lacking "metaphor and metonymy". Kitty Empire of The Observer called Babel "an anodyne record, lacking the shivery authority of Laura Marling's work", and viewed the band's "lack of nuance" as counterintuitive, writing that "folk is a malleable resource, and here it is stripped of all politics or witness-bearing, becoming an exercise in romantic exegesis for nice men with mandolins." Uncut magazine wrote similarly that the love themes "[reduce] the genre to the level of rusticised boy-band pop."

=== Accolades ===
Rolling Stone ranked Babel number 11 in their list of the 50 Best Albums of 2012. The album was nominated for four Grammy Awards, winning Album of the Year at the 55th Annual Grammy Awards. Babel was also nominated for the Brit Award for British Album of the Year at the 2013 BRIT Awards. Babel won the Juno Award for International Album of the Year. It was also included in Q Magazine's list of the 50 Greatest Albums of 2012.

== Commercial performance ==
Babel debuted at number one in the UK selling 159,000 copies and becoming the fastest selling album of 2012. It also sold 573,000 copies in the UK in 2012.

The album debuted at number one on the US Billboard 200, selling 600,000 copies, the second biggest debut of the year behind Taylor Swift's album, Red. The album spent a total of 15 weeks at No. 1 on the Billboard Alternative Albums chart, longer than any other album has since Dark Horse by Nickelback. It sold 1,463,000 copies in the US in 2012, which made it the fourth best-selling album in the US in 2012. It was also the eleventh best-selling album of 2013 with 1,096,000 copies sold for the year. As of May 2015, the album has sold 2.7 million copies in the US. The album also debuted at number one on the Canadian Albums Chart selling 75,000 copies.

== Track listing ==
All tracks are written by Mumford & Sons (Marcus Mumford, Ben Lovett, Winston Marshall, and Ted Dwane), except where noted.

No.	Title	Length
1.	"Babel"	3:29
2.	"Whispers in the Dark"	3:15
3.	"I Will Wait"	4:36
4.	"Holland Road"	4:13
5.	"Ghosts That We Knew"	5:39
6.	"Lover of the Light"	5:14
7.	"Lover's Eyes"	5:21
8.	"Reminder"	2:04
9.	"Hopeless Wanderer"	5:07
10.	"Broken Crown"	4:16
11.	"Below My Feet"	4:52
12.	"Not with Haste"	4:07

=== Bonus tracks ===
Deluxe edition bonus tracks
No.	Title	Writer(s)	Length
13.	"For Those Below"		3:36
14.	"The Boxer" (featuring Jerry Douglas and Paul Simon)	Paul Simon	4:06
15.	"Where Are You Now"		3:41

Target edition bonus disc
No.	Title	Length
1.	"Lover of the Light" (live)	5:05
2.	"Roll Away Your Stone" (live)	4:04
3.	"Below My Feet" (live)	4:40

=== Gentlemen of the Road Edition ===
On 29 October 2012 the band's website announced a new version of the album titled "Gentlemen of the Road Edition". This is the album alongside the bonus tracks, accompanied by a CD/DVD of the film The Road to Red Rocks. The film contains interviews and footage with the band recorded by the duo Fred & Nick whilst on the Gentlemen of the Road touring circuit, including two sold-out concerts at Red Rocks. The track listing is similar on both CD and DVD, with the exception of "Thistle & Weeds", contained only in the DVD.

Red Rocks Live (CD)
No.	Title	Length
1.	"Lover's Eyes"	5:43
2.	"Little Lion Man"	4:28
3.	"Below My Feet"	4:44
4.	"Roll Away Your Stone"	4:43
5.	"Lover of the Light"	5:22
6.	"Ghosts That We Knew"	5:55
7.	"Awake My Soul"	4:23
8.	"Whispers in the Dark"	3:39
9.	"Dust Bowl Dance"	4:57
10.	"I Will Wait"	4:46
11.	"The Cave"	4:11

== Personnel ==
=== Mumford & Sons ===
- Marcus Mumford – lead vocals, acoustic and electric guitars, drum kit, percussion
- Ben Lovett – piano, keyboards, mellotron, accordion, electric guitar, backing vocals
- Winston Marshall – banjo, electric banjo, electric bass, electric guitar, resonator guitar, backing vocals, lead vocals on "For Those Below" and small part in "Lovers Eyes"
- Ted Dwane – upright bass, electric bass, electric guitar, drum kit, percussion, backing vocals

=== Additional musicians ===
- Chris Alan – cello
- Nell Catchpole – violin, viola
- Nick Etwell – trumpet, flugelhorn
- Ross Holmes – fiddle
- Dave Williamson – trombone
- Richard Martin – percussion
- Jerry Douglas – dobro and backing vocals on "The Boxer"
- Paul Simon – electric guitar and backing vocals on "The Boxer"

== Charts ==
=== Weekly charts ===
Chart (2012–13)	Peak position
Australian Albums (ARIA)	2
Austrian Albums (Ö3 Austria)	2
Belgian Albums (Ultratop Flanders)	1
Canadian Albums (Billboard)	1
Danish Albums (Hitlisten)	4
Dutch Albums (Album Top 100)	1
Finnish Albums (Suomen virallinen lista)	19
German Albums (Offizielle Top 100)	2
Irish Albums (IRMA)	1
Italian Albums (FIMI)	5
Japanese Albums (Oricon)	97
New Zealand Albums (RMNZ)	1
Norwegian Albums (VG-lista)	1
Scottish Albums (Official Charts)	1
South African Albums (RISA)	3
Spanish Albums (PROMUSICAE)	12
Swedish Albums (Sverigetopplistan)	4
Swiss Albums (Schweizer Hitparade)	2
UK Albums (OCC)	1
US Billboard 200	1
US Independent Albums (Billboard)	1
US Americana/Folk Albums (Billboard)	1
US Top Rock Albums (Billboard)	1
US Top Alternative Albums (Billboard)	1

=== Year-end charts ===
Chart (2012)	Position
Belgian Albums (Ultratop Flanders)	10
Canadian Albums (Billboard)	4
Dutch Albums (MegaCharts)	7
New Zealand Albums (RMNZ)	8
Swiss Albums (Schweizer Hitparade)	35
UK Albums (OCC)	5
US Billboard 200	7
US Independent Albums (Billboard)	1
US Americana/Folk Albums (Billboard)	1
US Top Rock Albums (Billboard)	1
US Top Alternative Albums (Billboard)	1
US Top Digital Albums (Billboard)	3
Chart (2013)	Position
Austrian Albums (Ö3 Austria)	19
Belgian Albums (Ultratop Wallonia)	165
Canadian Albums (Billboard)	2
Dutch Albums (MegaCharts)	20
New Zealand Albums (RMNZ)	14
Spanish Albums (PROMUSICAE)	36
US Billboard 200	5
US Independent Albums (Billboard)	1
US Americana/Folk Albums (Billboard)	1
US Top Rock Albums (Billboard)	1
US Top Alternative Albums (Billboard)	1
Chart (2014)	Position
Belgian Albums (Ultratop Flanders)	149
US Billboard 200	125
US Independent Albums (Billboard)	20
US Americana/Folk Albums (Billboard)	4
US Top Rock Albums (Billboard)	41
US Top Alternative Albums (Billboard)	22

=== Decade-end charts ===
Chart (2010–2019)	Position
Australian Albums (ARIA)	33
UK Albums (OCC)	32
US Billboard 200	27

== Certifications and sales ==
Region	Certification	Certified units/sales
Australia (ARIA)	3× Platinum	210,000^{^}
Austria (IFPI Austria)	Platinum	20,000^{*}
Belgium (BRMA)	Gold	15,000^{*}
Canada (Music Canada)	5× Platinum	431,000
Denmark (IFPI Danmark)	Gold	10,000^{‡}
Germany (BVMI)	3× Gold	300,000^{‡}
Ireland (IRMA)	2× Platinum	30,000^{^}
Italy (FIMI)	Gold	25,000^{*}
Netherlands (NVPI)	Platinum	50,000^{^}
New Zealand (RMNZ)	4× Platinum	60,000^{‡}
Norway (IFPI Norway)	Gold	15,000^{*}
Sweden (GLF)	Platinum	40,000^{‡}
Switzerland (IFPI Switzerland)	Gold	15,000^{^}
United Kingdom (BPI)	4× Platinum	1,064,338
United States (RIAA)	2× Platinum	2,700,000
Summaries
Europe (IFPI)	Platinum	1,000,000^{*}
^{*} Sales figures based on certification alone.^{^} Shipments figures based on certification alone.^{‡} Sales+streaming figures based on certification alone.

== Release history ==
Regions	Dates	Format(s)	Edition(s)
Germany	21 September 2012	CD, digital download, vinyl	Standard, Deluxe
Belgium	21 September 2012	CD, digital download, vinyl	Standard, Deluxe
Netherlands	21 September 2012	CD, digital download, vinyl	Standard, Deluxe
South Africa	21 September 2012	CD, digital download, vinyl	Standard, Deluxe
Luxembourg	21 September 2012	CD, digital download, vinyl	Standard, Deluxe
Ireland	21 September 2012	CD, digital download, vinyl	Standard, Deluxe
Australia	21 September 2012	CD, digital download, vinyl	Standard, Deluxe
New Zealand	21 September 2012	CD, digital download, vinyl	Standard, Deluxe
UK	24 September 2012	CD, digital download, vinyl	Standard, Deluxe
Scandinavia	24 September 2012	CD, digital download, vinyl	Standard, Deluxe
Spain	24 September 2012	CD, digital download, vinyl	Standard, Deluxe
Italy	24 September 2012	CD, digital download, vinyl	Standard, Deluxe
Eastern Europe	24 September 2012	CD, digital download, vinyl	Standard, Deluxe
South America	24 September 2012	CD, digital download, vinyl	Standard, Deluxe
USA	25 September 2012	CD, digital download, vinyl	Standard, Deluxe
Canada	25 September 2012	CD, digital download, vinyl	Standard, Deluxe
