= Something Good (Alt-J song) =

Single by Alt-J

from the album An Awesome Wave
- Released: 28 September 2012
- Recorded: 2011
- Genre: Indie rock, art rock
- Length: 3:38
- Label: Infectious
- Songwriter(s): Joe Newman; Gus Unger-Hamilton; Gwilym Sainsbury; Thom Green
- Producer(s): Charlie Andrew

Alt-J singles chronology
"Tessellate" (2012)	"Something Good" (2012)	"Fitzpleasure" (2012)

Music video
- "Something Good" on YouTube

"Something Good" is a song by English indie rock quartet Alt-J from their debut studio album An Awesome Wave (2012). The song was released on 28 September 2012 as the album's fourth single. The song was written by Joe Newman, Gus Unger-Hamilton, Gwilym Sainsbury, Thom Green and produced by Charlie Andrew.

The song was featured in the 2013 version of BBC Two's "Tent Explorer" ident. It was also featured in the 2015 video game Life Is Strange.

== Music video ==
A music video to accompany the release of "Something Good" was first released on YouTube on 18 September 2012 at a total length of three minutes and forty-two seconds. The video was shot in Los Angeles, California, by Brewer, a directing duo by brothers Alex and Ben Brewer, and has earned them the 2013 Young Director Award for Non-European Music Video.

== Track listing ==
Digital download
No.	Title	Length
1.	"Something Good"	3:38
2.	"Something Good" (BlackBox Remix)	6:29
3.	"Something Good" (Tong & Rogers Remix)	8:22
4.	"Something Good" (Fort Romeau Remix)	4:36
5.	"Something Good" (The Invisible Remix)	5:08

== Chart performance ==
Chart (2012–13)	Peak position
Belgium (Ultratip Bubbling Under Flanders)	16
Belgium (Ultratip Bubbling Under Wallonia)	31
UK Singles (OCC)	76
UK Indie (OCC)	6

== Certifications ==
Region	Certification	Certified units/sales
Australia (ARIA)	Gold	35,000^{‡}
^{‡} Sales+streaming figures based on certification alone.

== Release history ==
Region	Date	Format	Label
United Kingdom	28 September 2012	Digital download	Infectious
