= An Awesome Wave =

Studio album by Alt-J
- Released: 25 May 2012
- Recorded: 2009–2011
- Studios: Iguana Studio (London, England)
- Genres: Indie rock; alt-pop; folktronica; art rock
- Length: 48:40
- Label: Infectious
- Producers: Charlie Andrew; Mark Bishop

Alt-J chronology
| Films EP (2009) | An Awesome Wave (2012) | This Is All Yours (2014) |

Singles from An Awesome Wave
- 1. "Bloodflood/Tessellate" Released: 13 October 2011; 2. "Matilda" Released: 24 February 2012; 3. "Breezeblocks" Released: 18 May 2012; 4. "Tessellate" Released: 13 July 2012; 5. "Something Good" Released: 28 September 2012; 6. "Fitzpleasure" Released: 18 May 2012; 7. "Dissolve Me" Released: 22 March 2013

An Awesome Wave is the debut album by English indie rock band Alt-J, released on 25 May 2012 through Infectious. The album includes the singles "Matilda"/"Fitzpleasure", "Breezeblocks" and "Tessellate". It peaked at number thirteen on the UK Albums Chart, and also charted in Belgium, France, Netherlands and Switzerland. An Awesome Wave won the 2012 British Mercury Prize, and in 2013 was named Album of the Year at the Ivor Novello Awards. The title is a reference to a quote from the 1991 Bret Easton Ellis novel American Psycho and the 2000 film of the same name.

== Artwork ==
The album artwork for An Awesome Wave is a multi-layered radar image of the Ganges river delta in Bangladesh and India. The image in each of the three layers was acquired by the European Space Agency's Envisat Earth-observing satellite, taken separately on 20 January, 24 February and 31 March 2009. The overlaid image, titled Ganges' Dazzling Delta, exposes a multitude of colours arising from the variations in background radiation occurring between the three acquisition times.

== Critical reception ==
Professional ratings
Aggregate scores
| Source | Rating |
|---|---|
| AnyDecentMusic? | 7.4/10 |
| Metacritic | 71/100 |
Review scores
| Source | Rating |
| AllMusic | 3.5/5 stars |
| The A.V. Club | C |
| The Irish Times | 4/5 stars |
| MSN Music (Expert Witness) | B+ |
| The New Zealand Herald | 4/5 stars |
| NME | 8/10 |
| Pitchfork | 4.8/10 |
| PopMatters | 8/10 |
| Q | 4/5 stars |
| Rolling Stone | 3/5 stars |

An Awesome Wave received generally positive reviews from music critics. At Metacritic, which assigns a normalised rating out of 100 to reviews from mainstream critics, the album received an average score of 71, based on 20 reviews, which indicates "generally favorable reviews". Jenny Stevens of NME felt that "the charm of Alt-J's musical scatterbrain is that it works", describing the album as "on the surface... smart alt-pop" while noting that the band "have messed with the formula just enough to make this a brilliantly disquieting debut" and that "in refusing to submit to the rigours of a genre, they might just have made themselves masters of their own." Andy Baber of musicOMH praised the band's ability to mix different musical styles and instruments on the album without coming off as forced or over-complicated. Similarly, BBC Music's Jen Long wrote that An Awesome Wave "spans every workable idea, genre, and influence that can be crammed under the guitar music umbrella, yet it never feels disorientating" and called it an "entirely comprehendible and accessible collection of beautiful pop songs."

Ruth Singleton of Drowned in Sound described An Awesome Wave as "a beautifully rounded, awesome debut album" and said that "whatever Alt-J were aiming for with their debut album, they have managed to prove their value as talented musicians, literary enthusiasts and imagery aficionados." Joe Zadeh of Clash praised the band as "young, yet somehow void of naivety." Jon O'Brien of AllMusic felt that the album was "occasionally guilty of pretentiousness", but that its "eclectic arrays of sound are woven together in a manner so effortlessly that the results never feel forced or contrived." In a more negative assessment, Mojo felt that the band "aim for 'cryptic experimental pop' but hit 'pompous whimsy'" and that "the whole album is uncertain and unconvincing". Laura Snapes of Pitchfork referred to the songs as "draining, elongated MOR tunes".

== Commercial performance ==
An Awesome Wave entered the UK Albums Chart at number nineteen on sales of 6,720 copies. After winning the Mercury Prize, the album reached a new peak position of number thirteen, selling 13,527 copies. On 2 August 2013, the album was certified platinum by the British Phonographic Industry (BPI), denoting shipments in excess of 300,000 units in the UK.

In Canada, the album debuted at number thirty on the Canadian Albums Chart, selling 1,800 copies.

An Awesome Wave first charted in America on 6 October 2012, initially entering at #134. On 4 May 2013, seven months later, An Awesome Wave achieved its peak position of #80.

== Track listing ==
All tracks are written by Joe Newman, Gus Unger-Hamilton, Gwilym Sainsbury and Thom Green.

An Awesome Wave track listing
| No. | Title | Length |
|---|---|---|
| 1. | "Intro" | 2:37 |
| 2. | "❦" (The Ripe & Ruin) | 1:12 |
| 3. | "Tessellate" | 3:02 |
| 4. | "Breezeblocks" | 3:47 |
| 5. | "❦" (Guitar) | 1:17 |
| 6. | "Something Good" | 3:38 |
| 7. | "Dissolve Me" | 3:59 |
| 8. | "Matilda" | 3:48 |
| 9. | "Ms" | 3:59 |
| 10. | "Fitzpleasure" | 3:39 |
| 11. | "❦" (Piano) | 0:53 |
| 12. | "Bloodflood" | 4:09 |
| 13. | "Taro" ("Taro" ends at 5:03; hidden track "Hand-Made" starts at 10:08 following 5:05 of silence) | 12:40 |
| Total length: | | 48:40 |

On CD, "Hand-Made" is on the same track as "Taro", separated by several minutes of silence. It is not on the vinyl, however is included as a hidden track within "Taro" when downloaded with the included download code.

iTunes Store deluxe edition bonus tracks
| No. | Title | Length |
|---|---|---|
| 15. | "Breezeblocks" (Alt-J vs. NOC// Mix) | 3:06 |
| 16. | "Breezeblocks" (B-JU Remix) | 3:59 |
| 17. | "Breezeblocks" (Rockdaworld Remix) | 4:41 |
| 18. | "Breezeblocks" (Submerse Remix) | 5:06 |
| 19. | "Breezeblocks" (Tom Vek's SFX Remix) | 5:18 |
| 20. | "Fitzpleasure" (bretonLABS Remix) | 4.23 |
| 21. | "Fitzpleasure" (Dave Sitek Remix) | 3:18 |
| 22. | "Fitzpleasure" (Jim James 'Apple C' Remix) | 4:20 |
| 23. | "Fitzpleasure" (The Internet of Odd Future Remix) | 4:30 |
| 24. | "Matilda" (Ghostpoet 'Gang Panang Adlit' Remix) | 3:49 |
| 25. | "Something Good" (BlackBox Remix) | 6:29 |
| 26. | "Something Good" (Fort Romeau Remix) | 4:36 |
| 27. | "Something Good" (The Invisible BMC Remix) | 5:08 |
| 28. | "Something Good" (Tong & Rogers Remix) | 8:22 |
| 29. | "Tessellate" (Anstam Remix) | 3:58 |
| 30. | "Tessellate" (Ben De Vries Remix) | 4:06 |
| 31. | "Tessellate" (BlackBox Remix) | 5:55 |
| 32. | "Tessellate" (Broadbandits Afro Mix) | 5:27 |
| 33. | "Tessellate" (Dam Mantle Remix) | 6:17 |
| 34. | "Tessellate" (Marlais Remix) | 3:53 |
| 35. | "Fitzpleasure" (Live from the Africa Centre 14.04.12) | 4:03 |
| 36. | "Taro" (Live from the Africa Centre 14.04.12) | 4:23 |
| 37. | "Tessellate" (Live from the Africa Centre 14.04.12) | 4:26 |
| 38. | "Bloodflood" (SARM Acoustic Version) | 3:33 |
| 39. | "Matilda" (SARM Acoustic Version) | 3:59 |
| 40. | "Something Good" (SARM Acoustic Version) | 3:39 |
| 41. | "Tessellate" (SARM Acoustic Version) | 3:02 |
| 42. | "Breezeblocks" (music video) | 3:47 |
| 43. | "Tessellate" (music video) | 3:01 |
| 44. | "Something Good" (music video) | 3:39 |

== Personnel ==
Credits adapted from the liner notes of An Awesome Wave.

- Charlie Andrew – production
- Dick Beetham – mastering
- Mark Bishop – production ("Hand-Made")
- European Space Agency – cover photo provider
- Rachael Lander – cello ("Taro")
- Kirsty Mangan – string arrangements (all tracks); violin ("Tessellate", "Taro")
- St Ronan's Chamber Choir – additional vocals ("Bloodflood", "Taro")

== Charts ==
=== Weekly charts ===
| Chart (2012–2013) | Peak position |
|---|---|
| Australian Albums (ARIA) | 9 |
| Australian Dance Albums (ARIA) | 2 |
| Belgian Albums (Ultratop Flanders) | 17 |
| Belgian Albums (Ultratop Wallonia) | 51 |
| Danish Albums (Hitlisten) | 34 |
| Dutch Albums (Album Top 100) | 18 |
| French Albums (SNEP) | 45 |
| Irish Albums (IRMA) | 11 |
| Irish Independent Albums Chart | 1 |
| Italian Albums (FIMI) | 97 |
| New Zealand Albums (RMNZ) | 24 |
| Scottish Albums (Official Charts) | 17 |
| Swiss Albums (Schweizer Hitparade) | 39 |
| UK Albums (Official Charts) | 13 |
| UK Indie Albums (OCC) | 1 |
| US Billboard 200 | 80 |
| US Top Alternative Albums (Billboard) | 15 |
| US Top Rock Albums (Billboard) | 23 |

=== Year-end charts ===
| Chart (2012) | Position |
|---|---|
| Australian Dance Albums (ARIA) | 20 |
| Belgian Albums (Ultratop Flanders) | 97 |
| French Albums (SNEP) | 122 |
| UK Albums (OCC) | 61 |

| Chart (2013) | Position |
|---|---|
| Australian Albums (ARIA) | 48 |
| Australian Dance Albums (ARIA) | 6 |
| Belgian Albums (Ultratop Flanders) | 48 |
| Belgian Albums (Ultratop Flanders) | 173 |
| French Albums (SNEP) | 134 |
| UK Albums (OCC) | 67 |
| US Billboard 200 | 150 |
| US Top Alternative Albums (Billboard) | 32 |
| US Top Rock Albums (Billboard) | 36 |

| Chart (2020) | Position |
|---|---|
| Belgian Albums (Ultratop Flanders) | 173 |

| Chart (2021) | Position |
|---|---|
| Belgian Albums (Ultratop Flanders) | 162 |

| Chart (2022) | Position |
|---|---|
| Belgian Albums (Ultratop Flanders) | 178 |

| Chart (2023) | Position |
|---|---|
| Belgian Albums (Ultratop Flanders) | 162 |

== Certifications ==
| Region | Certification | Certified units/sales |
|---|---|---|
| Australia (ARIA) | Platinum | 70,000^{^} |
| Canada (Music Canada) | Gold | 40,000^{^} |
| Italy (FIMI) | Gold | 25,000^{‡} |
| Netherlands (NVPI) | Platinum | 50,000^{‡} |
| United Kingdom (BPI) | Platinum | 384,346 |
| United States (RIAA) | Platinum | 1,000,000^{‡} |
^{^} Shipments figures based on certification alone.^{‡} Sales+streaming figures based on certification alone.

== Release history ==
| Region | Date | Format(s) | Label |
|---|---|---|---|
| United Kingdom | 25 May 2012 | Digital download | Infectious Music |
| United Kingdom | 28 May 2012 | CD, LP | Infectious Music |
| United States | 18 September 2012 | CD, LP, digital download | Canvasback, Atlantic Records |
