= Loud and Quiet =

British music magazine

- Issue 84, 18 March 2018
- Editor: Stuart Stubbs
- Categories: Music
- Frequency: Bi-monthly
- Publisher: Loud and Quiet
- Total circulation: 32,000 (2012)
- Founder: Stuart Stubbs
- Founded: 2005
- First issue: January 2005
- Country: England, United Kingdom
- Based in: London
- Language: English
- Website: loudandquiet.com
- ISSN: 2049-9892

Loud and Quiet is a British bi-monthly music magazine that focuses on new music from underground indie, alternative, electronic and hip hop artists.

== History and profile ==
The magazine was founded in January 2005 by Stuart Stubbs as a home-printed fanzine in Southend-on-Sea, Essex. It relocated to London in 2006.

Issue 01 of Loud and Quiet featured Pete Doherty on its cover. Only 150 copies were published in a home-made fanzine style and distributed through independent record shops and clothes shops in London, England.

Loud and Quiet printed two A4 issues in 2008 before being relaunched as a newspaper to cut growing print costs in 2009.

In March 2016 Loud and Quiet started distributing in New York City.

The same year, the magazine launched the music interview podcast Midnight Chats.

In March 2018 Loud and Quiet relaunched its magazine with a new format and design.

Following the 2020 COVID-19 pandemic, the magazine launched a subscription model in April 2020, and announced that it would remain in print as a bi-monthly title.

== Loud and Quiet Recordings ==
To celebrate 5 years of Loud and Quiet, a small record label arm of the company was created in 2010 for the release of I AM V, a compilation featuring selected bands from past issues of the magazine. These included Health, Metronomy, Gold Panda and Telepathe.

In October 2011, Loud and Quiet Recordings released "Bloodflood / Tessellate", the début single by Alt-J (∆) who were later nominated for and won Mercury Prize in 2012.

== Loud and Quiet shows ==
Throughout 2008/2009 Loud and Quiet co-hosted live events with London indie label Dirty Bingo, promoting shows for The xx, Micachu and Factory Floor. In October 2009 the two projects together hosted the debut UK tour for San Diego band Crocodiles.

In the following years, Loud and Quiet hosted the second stage at Offset Festival, a two-day DIY festival in Hainault, Essex.
