= Fitzpleasure =

Single by Alt-J

from the album An Awesome Wave
- A-side: "Matilda"
- Released: 18 May 2012 (split single)
- Recorded: 2011
- Genre: Industrial rock; experimental rock; indietronica; indie rock; art rock
- Length: 3:42
- Label: Infectious
- Songwriters: Augustus Figaro Niso Unger-Hamilton, Thomas Stuart Green, Joe Jerome Newman, Gwilym David Dylan Sainsbury
- Producer: Charlie Andrew

Alt-J singles chronology
"Something Good" (2012)	"Fitzpleasure" (2012)	"Dissolve Me" (2013)

"Fitzpleasure" is a song by British indie pop band Alt-J from their debut studio album An Awesome Wave (2012).

== Music video ==
A music video for the song, composed of black and white clips, was directed by Emile Sornin and published to YouTube on November 5, 2012.

== Remakes ==
After seeing the band perform live, Jim James, lead vocalist, guitarist, and songwriter for My Morning Jacket said, "...It kind of gave me this good, foreboding feeling. It was like seeing one of the great bands very young." This encouraged James to remix the song, and his 'Apple C' remix was included on the deluxe edition of An Awesome Wave.

The song was used by American recording artist Miley Cyrus during her Bangerz Tour, in a bondage-themed video interlude titled Tongue Tied. This later inspired the band to sample a line from her song "4x4" on "Hunger of the Pine", the lead single from their second album This Is All Yours (2014).

== Charts ==
Chart (2012–13)	Peak position
Austria (Ö3 Austria Top 40)	47
US Hot Rock & Alternative Songs (Billboard)	48
US Alternative Airplay (Billboard)	27
US Rock & Alternative Airplay (Billboard)	44

== Certifications ==
Region	Certification	Certified units/sales
United Kingdom (BPI)	Silver	200,000^{‡}
United States (RIAA)	Gold	500,000^{‡}
^{‡} Sales+streaming figures based on certification alone.
