= Babel (song) =

Single by Mumford & Sons

from the album Babel
- Released: 9 July 2013
- Recorded: 2011–2012
- Genre: Indie folk
- Length: 3:29
- Label: Island
- Songwriters: Ted Dwane, Ben Lovett, Marcus Mumford and Winston Marshall
- Producer: Markus Dravs

Mumford & Sons singles chronology
"Whispers in the Dark" (2013)	"Babel" (2013)	"Hopeless Wanderer" (2013)

"Babel" is a song performed by British folk rock band Mumford & Sons, released as the fourth single from their second studio album Babel (2012). It was released on 9 July 2013 as a digital download. The song was written by Mumford & Sons and produced by Markus Dravs.

== About the name ==
"Babel" is the name of both the song and the album on which their song appeared. The title is a reference to the story known as the Tower of Babel from Genesis 11:1–9 in the Bible. The song features numerous other biblical references too, which is common for music by Mumford & Sons.

Still, they maintain that their message is not intended to be explicitly religious in nature. Rather, their bassist, Ted Dwane, noted in a Rolling Stone interview that the song is more generally about human striving and discontentment: "As humans, we’re such a discontented species. We’re always trying to further ourselves, and you get all the way to the moon and then it’s just discontent. You want to go to Mars."

== Music video ==
A music video to accompany the release of "Babel" was first released onto YouTube on 8 July 2013 at a total length of four minutes and five seconds. The video shows the band performing the song in the former 16th Street station in Oakland, California.

== Track listing ==
Digital download
No.	Title	Length
1.	"Babel"	3:29

== Charts and certifications ==
=== Weekly charts ===
Chart (2013)	Peak position
Belgium (Ultratip Bubbling Under Flanders)	8
UK Singles (OCC)	76
US Billboard Hot 100	60
US Hot Rock & Alternative Songs (Billboard)	9
US Adult Alternative Airplay (Billboard)	13
US Alternative Airplay (Billboard)	19
US Rock & Alternative Airplay (Billboard)	25

=== Year-end charts ===
Chart (2013)	Position
US Hot Rock Songs (Billboard)	45
US Adult Alternative Songs (Billboard)	39

=== Certifications ===
Region	Certification	Certified units/sales
New Zealand (RMNZ)	Gold	15,000^{‡}
United Kingdom (BPI)	Gold	400,000^{‡}
^{‡} Sales+streaming figures based on certification alone.

== Release history ==
Region	Date	Format	Label
United Kingdom	9 July 2013	Digital download	Island Records
