= Tessellate (song) =

Single by Alt-J

from the album An Awesome Wave
- Released: 13 July 2012
- Recorded: 2011
- Genre: Indietronica; trip hop; art rock
- Length: 3:02
- Label: Infectious; Atlantic
- Songwriters: Joe Newman; Gus Unger-Hamilton; Gwilym Sainsbury; Thom Green
- Producer: Charlie Andrew

Alt-J singles chronology
"Breezeblocks" (2012)	"Tessellate" (2012)	"Something Good" (2012)

Music video
- "Tessellate" on YouTube

"Tessellate" is a song by English indie rock band Alt-J from their debut studio album, An Awesome Wave (2012). The song was written by Joe Newman, Gus Unger-Hamilton, Gwilym Sainsbury and Thom Green and produced by Charlie Andrew. It was originally released on 13 October 2011 as a double A-side single with “Bloodflood”, before being released separately on 13 July 2012 as the album's third single.

== Music video ==
A music video to accompany the release of "Tessellate" was first released on YouTube on 9 July 2012. The video was directed by Alex Southam and is a reworking of the painting The School of Athens by Raphael, using 21st century characters in a room similar to the painting's background (Panthéon, in Paris). One of the characters at the very beginning of the clip is wearing a printed T-shirt of the painting.

== Covers ==
In 2013, "Tessellate" was covered by English singer and songwriter Ellie Goulding on the deluxe edition of Halcyon Days, the reissue of her second studio album, Halcyon. English indie folk band Mumford & Sons also covered the song on BBC Radio 1's Live Lounge on 25 September 2012; their version was included on the compilation album BBC Radio 1's Live Lounge 2013.

== Media usage ==
The song is used as the opening theme song to the anime series Ingress.

The song has been featured in the soundtrack to the television series The Day of the Jackal and Alien: Earth.

Is the ending song of the 1st Season of the television series Atypical.

== Track listing ==
Digital download
No.	Title	Length
1.	"Tessellate"	3:02
2.	"Tessellate" (Live at the Africa Centre)	4:26
3.	"Tessellate" (Dam Mantle Remix)	6:17
4.	"Tessellate" (Anstam Remix)	3:58
5.	"Tessellate" (Marlais Remix)	3:53

== Charts ==
Chart (2012–13)	Peak position
Belgium (Ultratip Bubbling Under Flanders)	74
Canada Rock (Billboard)	46
UK Singles (Official Charts Company)	120
UK Independent (Official Charts)	6
US Hot Rock & Alternative Songs (Billboard)	43
US Alternative Airplay (Billboard)	19
US Rock & Alternative Airplay (Billboard)	33

== Certifications ==
Region	Certification	Certified units/sales
Australia (ARIA)	Gold	35,000^{‡}
United Kingdom (BPI)	Silver	200,000^{‡}
United States (RIAA)	Gold	500,000^{‡}
^{‡} Sales+streaming figures based on certification alone.

== Release history ==
Region	Date	Format	Label
United Kingdom	13 July 2012	Digital download	Infectious; Atlantic
