= Chance Waters =

Australian hip hop artist (born 1987)

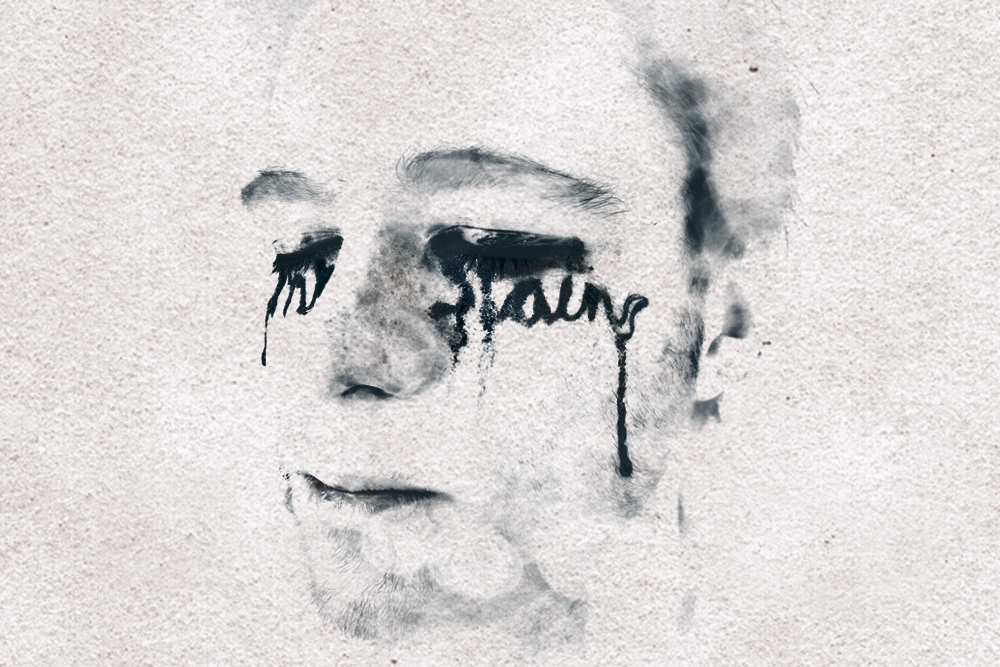
- Booklet art from Inkstains

Background information
- Born: 1987 (age 38–39)
- Origin: Sydney, New South Wales, Australia
- Genre: Hip hop
- Occupations: Rapper; songwriter; record producer
- Instrument: Vocals
- Years active: 2003–2015
- Labels: Nurcha; Obese; I Forget, Sorry!; Permanent
- Formerly of: Natural Causes
- Website: chancewaters.com

Chance Dylan Waters (previously known as Phatchance), is a retired independent Australian hip hop artist and record producer. Under the moniker Phatchance, Waters was a founder of the group Natural Causes, in 2003 which issued an album, The Incidental Noise Demo (August 2007), and toured nationally. The group disbanded later that year.

In 2009 Waters independently released his debut album Inkstains, as Phatchance, via Obese Records distribution. His second album Infinity, released under his real name, was issued in November 2012. Waters' solo songs include "Maybe Tomorrow" and "Young & Dumb", both received significant national airplay on Triple J and were placed in the triple j Hottest 100 of 2012.

== Biography ==
Waters has toured in support of many of Australia's biggest hip-hop acts, including Bliss N Eso, Drapht, The Herd, Pez & 360. In 2009 he was a Featured Artist on Triple J Unearthed, an initiative run by the national youth broadcaster Triple J to expose and promote talented unsigned Australian artists – since being unearthed he has received airplay and accolades from the station. In the same year he was also awarded a front-page feature on social networking website Myspace and received coverage in The Australian.

In 2011 he released the extended player Inkstains (Acoustic) an acoustic re-imagining of various songs from Inkstains including an acoustic version of the title track and lead single to his second record Infinity. The EP's single Build It Up (Acoustic) featured independent Brisbane folk band Charlie Mayfair and received airplay on triple j. To promote the EP Waters appeared on the front cover of mX in Sydney and gave an interview and live performance on the Triple J Hip Hop Show and FBi Radio. In support of the EP Waters embarked on the Hey, Where's Your DJ? east coast tour, which was billed as the first ever acoustic Australian hip hop tour and included a three-week capacity residency at Oxford Art Factory in Sydney. At the end of 2011 Waters released the Approaching Infinity mixtape, his final release under the Phatchance moniker. The release included a remix of Gotye's international hit "Somebody That I Used to Know" which saw chart success on radio in Europe.

In 2012 Waters announced he was nearing completion of his follow up album Infinity and that he was relinquishing the Phatchance moniker in favour of his given name. In February 2012 he released the first single from Infinity in the form of the title track and accompanying video clip. The song received airplay on triple j and the video clip received national play on ABC's RAGE!. In support of the single Waters embarked on his first east coast tour for the year, the Approaching Infinity tour, which included a capacity show with fellow rapper Seth Sentry at The Evelyn in Melbourne and a Sydney performance at FBi Social. In May 2012 Waters released the second single from Infinity Maybe Tomorrow featuring Sydney Soul singer Lilian Blue. The song was added to the triple j hit list and achieved high rotation on the station, it was also picked up by National Geographic as the promotional music to their internationally franchised program Doomsday Preppers. The song was the 9th most added track to radio in Australia in the second week of May and peaked at No. 2 on the AIR national independent radio charts in June. The accompanying video clip was named RAGE! Indie of the Week and would later place at No. 7 in the 2012 RAGE! Top 50.

In August 2012 Chance Waters announced he was releasing his new album Infinity through the Shock Records imprint Permanent Records. The same month in an interview with Sarah Howells on triple j Waters said he was working on a new single with Bertie Blackman and that Infinity would be released on 2 November. The single, Young and Dumb was exclusively premiered on triple j on 20 September and performed live for the first time on Like a Version alongside a cover of Mumford & Sons little lion man. In November 2012 Waters was nominated for the Unearthed J Award and released his sophomore record Infinity which also signified his first top 100 album, debuting at No. 54 on the ARIA Album Charts. Young & Dumb went on to place at No. 45 in the Triple J Hottest 100, 2012 alongside Maybe Tomorrow at No. 89.

Chance has been booked for festivals including Sydney Big Day Out, Insert To Play, Rip It Up, The Big Pineapple Festival and Nannup Music Festival.

=== Natural Causes ===
From 2003 to 2007 Phatchance was one of the founding members of the Sydney Hip-Hop group Natural Causes the flagship act for Independent record label Nurcha Records. Prior to the collapse of Nurcha Records and the eventual collapse of the band, they played more than 70 live shows across Australia.

Natural Causes first and only release The Incidental Noise Demo was released on Nurcha Records in 2007. The first single from the release Introductions received Single of the Week on FBi Radio, Sydney's largest Independent Broadcaster.

== Personal life ==
Chance Waters was born in Sydney but grew up in Christies Beach, South Australia after a short stint in Melbourne. At the age of twelve Waters moved back to Sydney, living in Balmain, with his single parent mother and brother. Waters completed his primary schooling at North Rocks Public School and then attended Fort Street High School in Petersham a school whose alumni includes artists and bands such as Josh Pyke, Horrorshow and Spit Syndicate.

Per Waters' LinkedIn page, he has moved into working with startup companies since he stopped making music in 2015. He also worked as the brand leader of Red Bull for several years.

== Discography ==
=== Albums ===
- Inkstains – Obese (November 2009)
- Infinity – I Forget, Sorry! (November 2012) Aus No. 54

=== EP's ===
- Nobody Give Raph a Guest Spot with Coptic Soldier – I Forgot, Sorry! (August 2008)
- Inkstains (Acoustic) – Permanent/I Forgot, Sorry! (18 February 2011)

=== Singles ===
- "Inkstains" (2009)
- "Build It Up" (Acoustic) (ft. Charlie Mayfair) (2011)
- "Infinity" (2012)
- "Maybe Tomorrow" (ft. Lilian Blue) (2012)
- "Young and Dumb" (ft. Bertie Blackman) (2012) Aus No. 91
- "Looking for Something" (ft. Patience Hodgson) (2013)
- "Break of Dawn" (2015)

=== Mixtapes ===
- Approaching Infinity (2011)

=== Natural Causes ===
- The Incidental Noise Demo – Nurcha (2007)

=== J Award ===
The J Awards are an annual series of Australian music awards that were established by the Australian Broadcasting Corporation's youth-focused radio station Triple J. They commenced in 2005.

Year	Nominee / work	Award	Result
J Awards of 2012	themselves	Unearthed Artist of the Year	Nominated
