= On Top (Flume song) =

Single by Flume featuring T.Shirt

from the album Flume
- Released: June 2012
- Recorded: 2012
- Genre: Electronic
- Length: 3:51
- Label: Future Classic
- Songwriters: Harley Streten; George Tryfonos

Flume singles chronology
"Sleepless" (2011)	"On Top" (2012)	"Sleepless" (2012)

"On Top" was released as the first single from Flume's debut studio album, Flume. It features the vocals from American rapper T.Shirt. The track reached its peak of number 57 in Australia on 4 March 2013 and was certified Gold.

== Music video ==
The music video was directed by Angus Lee Forbes and released on 3 June 2013.

== In popular culture ==
"On Top" was also featured in the movie Moto 6 and in the 2014 MLB video game, MLB 14: The Show. Also featured as Twitch streamer "xQcOW"'s donation notification sound.

== Charts ==
Chart (2013)	Peak position
Australia (ARIA)	57

== Certifications ==
Region	Certification	Certified units/sales
Australia (ARIA)	Gold	35,000^{^}
^{^} Shipments figures based on certification alone.
