= Get Better =

Get Better may refer to:

- Get Better Records, a record label
- Get Better (Alt-J song), 2021
- "Get Better", a song by alt-J from The Dream (2022)
- "Get Better", a song by Lou Bega from Lounatic (2005)
- "Get Better", a song by Dan le Sac Vs Scroobius Pip from The Logic of Chance (2010)
- "Get Better", a song by Mates of State from Re-Arrange Us (2008)
- "Get Better", a song by New Fast Automatic Daffodils from Pigeonhole (1990)
- "Get Better", a song by Nothing Like Thieves from Broken Machine (2017)
- "Get Better", a song by Frank Turner from Positive Songs for Negative People (2015)

== See also ==
- Getting Better (disambiguation)
