= List of The Late Show with Stephen Colbert episodes (2022) =

- No. of episodes: 160

Release
- Original network: CBS
- Original release: January 3 – December 15, 2022

Season chronology
- ← Previous; 2021 episodes Next → 2023 episodes

This is the list of episodes of The Late Show with Stephen Colbert that aired in 2022.

The episode scheduled for April 21, 2022 was cancelled due to Colbert testing positive for COVID-19. Jason Bateman and Laura Linney from Ozark, along with Matt Walsh from Veep were scheduled to be guests. The next live show was not set to occur until May 2. On May 9, the show announced that new episodes would not be taped until further notice, after Colbert experienced symptoms consistent with a recurrence of COVID. On July 22, the show introduced its first-ever slate of musical residencies, with St. Vincent, James Taylor and Joe Walsh announced as the inaugural artists, starting on July 25.

Beginning May 23, the show reduces its production schedule to four new shows a week with reruns on Fridays. This schedule continues for the rest of the show's run.

== 2022 ==
=== January ===
No.	Original release date	Guest(s)	Musical/entertainment guest(s)
1187	January 3, 2022	Dr. Rochelle Walensky, Utkarsh Ambudkar	N/A
Dr. Rochelle Walensky discusses the COVID-19 pandemic. Utkarsh Ambudkar discusses Ghosts.
1188	January 4, 2022	Jennifer Lawrence, Ralph Macchio	Nell and The Flaming Lips
Late Show Presents: Meanwhile. Jennifer Lawrence takes "The Colbert Questionert" (new footage from December 6, 2021 episode). Ralph Macchio discusses Cobra Kai. Nell and The Flaming Lips perform "Red Right Hand" from their collaborative album Where the Viaduct Looms.
1189	January 5, 2022	Senator Amy Klobuchar	SAINt JHN
The Fish and the Furious. Senator Amy Klobuchar discusses the 1st anniversary of the January 6th Capitol attack and recent politics. SAINt JHN performs "The Best Part of Life".
1190	January 6, 2022	John Dickerson, Corey Hawkins	N/A
Abhor-Rent. John Dickerson discusses the 1st anniversary of the January 6th Capitol attack. Corey Hawkins discusses The Tragedy of Macbeth.
1191	January 7, 2022	Keanu Reeves	Genesis Owusu
Space News: Brands In Space Edition. Seditionist Round Up Roundup. Late Show Presents: Meanwhile. Keanu Reeves discusses The Matrix Resurrections and BRZRKR (segment rebroadcast from December 13, 2021 episode). Genesis Owusu performs "Gold Chains" from his album Smiling with No Teeth.
1192	January 10, 2022	Gayle King, Tig Notaro	N/A
Cyborgasm. Gayle King discusses her 10 years with CBS. Tig Notaro discusses her new comedy tour, Hello Again.
1193	January 11, 2022	Bradley Cooper	Robert Finley with Dan Auerbach
Late Show Presents: Meanwhile. Meanwhile Presents: Marine-While. Marine-While Presents: Vagine-While. Bradley Cooper discusses Nightmare Alley, Licorice Pizza and Maestro. Robert Finley performs "Make Me Feel Alright" from his album Sharecropper's Son, with Dan Auerbach providing musical accompaniment.
1194	January 12, 2022	Keanu Reeves, Caitriona Balfe	N/A
Babe 3: Pancetta with a Vendetta. #ColbertSmallBizBump. Keanu Reeves takes "The Colbert Questionert" (new footage from December 13, 2021 episode). Caitriona Balfe discusses Belfast.
1195	January 13, 2022	Liev Schreiber	Allison Russell
A Late Show Presents: Great Directors Direct The Player Intros (special appearances by Victor Cruz, Markus Kuhn, Jonathan Casillas, Lorenzo Carter, Folorunso Fatukasi and Bennett Jackson; segment rebroadcast from February 7, 2021 episode). Liev Schreiber discusses Ray Donovan: The Movie. Allison Russell performs "Persephone" from her album Outside Child.
1196	January 14, 2022	Bradley Cooper, Corey Stoll	Geese
Reefer Wellness. Disinformation Station. Late Show Presents: Meanwhile. Bradley Cooper takes "The Colbert Questionert" (new footage from January 11 episode). Corey Stoll discusses West Side Story and Billions. Late Show Presents: Audience Questions. Geese performs "Low Era" from their album Projector.
1197	January 17, 2022	Senator Elizabeth Warren	Ingrid Andress & Sam Hunt
Romansplaining with Stephen Colbert. Senator Elizabeth Warren discusses recent politics. Ingrid Andress & Sam Hunt perform "Wishful Drinking".
1198	January 18, 2022	Brian Cox, Samantha Bee	N/A
Covid Garden. Late Show Presents: Meanwhile. Meanwhile Presents: Meanwhile Update. Stephen Colbert's Birds and the Bees Cam. Brian Cox discusses his new book, Putting the Rabbit in the Hat. Samantha Bee discusses Full Frontal.
1199	January 19, 2022	Christine Baranski	Nation of Language
Rich People – They're Just Not Like Us: Us Pay Taxes. Christine Baranski discusses The Gilded Age. Nation of Language performs "Across That Fine Line" from their album A Way Forward.
1200	January 20, 2022	Dionne Warwick, David Cross	N/A
Stephen celebrates the show's 1200th episode. Dionne Warwick discusses her new single, "Power in the Name", and her career in music. Stephen and Dionne Warwick acknowledge the death of Sidney Poitier. David Cross discusses his new comedy tour, I'm from the Future.
1201	January 21, 2022	Elvis Costello	Elvis Costello and The Imposters
Weird: The Al Jankovic Story. Comeuppance Watch. Late Show Presents: Meanwhile. Elvis Costello discusses his new audio book, How to Play the Guitar and Y, and his new album, The Boy Named If. Elvis Costello and The Imposters perform "Magnificent Hurt".
1202	January 24, 2022	Kristen Stewart, Jonathan Van Ness	N/A
Smile File. Exactly What You Thought, But Worse Than You Imagined. Stephen Colbert Is Watching Your Children (special appearance by Michio Kaku). Kristen Stewart discusses Spencer and Crimes of the Future. Jonathan Van Ness discusses Getting Curious.
1203	January 25, 2022	Joy Reid, Thomas Middleditch	N/A
Late Show Presents: Meanwhile. Meanwhile Presents: Queenwhile. Joy Reid discusses recent politics. Thomas Middleditch discusses B Positive.
1204	January 26, 2022	Adrien Brody	Lady Wray
The Late Chic Presents: Stephen Colbert's Slay Your Fleek. Adrien Brody discusses Clean and Succession. Lady Wray performs "Come On In" from her album Piece of Me.
1205	January 27, 2022	Kate & Oliver Hudson	St. Paul and The Broken Bones
Gaetz-Gaete!: Up-Gaete! OccupalMAX. Kate & Oliver Hudson discuss their new podcast, Sibling Revelry. St. Paul and The Broken Bones perform "The Last Dance" from their album The Alien Coast.
1206	January 28, 2022	Marlee Matlin, Mackenzie Davis	N/A
Winter Is Coming: The Road to the Olympics (Brought to You by CBS: The Official Network of Not Airing The Olympics). Late Show Presents: Meanwhile. Marlee Matlin discusses CODA. Mackenzie Davis discusses Station Eleven.
1207	January 31, 2022	Whoopi Goldberg, Representative Ro Khanna	N/A
Spotify Misinformation Playlist. Late Show Presents: Meanwhile. Whoopi Goldberg discusses Star Trek: Picard and Caught in His Web. Representative Ro Khanna discusses recent politics and his new book, Dignity in a Digital Age.

=== February ===
No.	Original release date	Guest(s)	Musical/entertainment guest(s)
1208	February 1, 2022	Faith Hill	Aurora
Stephen speaks with CNN chief international correspondent Clarissa Ward, live from Ukraine. Faith Hill discusses 1883. Aurora performs "A Temporary High" from her album The Gods We Can Touch. Late Show Presents: Rehearsal Rewind.
1209	February 2, 2022	Tim McGraw, Martha Stewart	N/A
Late Show Presents: Meanwhile. Tim McGraw discusses 1883. Martha Stewart steps into the kitchen with Stephen. Late Show Presents: Rehearsal Rewind.
1210	February 3, 2022	Dua Lipa	2 Chainz featuring Lil Durk and Sleepy Rose
First Drafts: Valentine's Day Cards, with Stephen's wife, Evie. Dua Lipa discusses her career in music. 2 Chainz performs "Lost Kings" from his album Dope Don't Sell Itself, featuring Lil Durk and Sleepy Rose.
1211	February 14, 2022	Jeffrey Wright, Alex Borstein	Maxwell
St. AdSpace Hospital. Jeffrey Wright discusses The Batman and Lincoln's Dilemma. Alex Borstein discusses The Marvelous Mrs. Maisel. Maxwell performs "OFF".
1212	February 15, 2022	John Oliver	Future Islands
Manston & Manston Accountants. Woah, Canada! John Oliver discusses Last Week Tonight. Future Islands perform "King of Sweden".
1213	February 16, 2022	Daniel Craig, Doris Kearns Goodwin	N/A
Taboo: White Fragility Edition. Daniel Craig discusses No Time to Die and Macbeth. Doris Kearns Goodwin discusses Abraham Lincoln.
1214	February 17, 2022	Margaret Brennan, Adam Scott	N/A
Woah, Canada! Tales From The Crypto. Late Show Presents: Meanwhile. Margaret Brennan discusses recent politics. Adam Scott discusses Severance.
1215	February 21, 2022	Joseph Gordon-Levitt	alt-J
Joseph Gordon-Levitt discusses Super Pumped. alt-J performs "U&Me" from their album The Dream.
1216	February 22, 2022	John Turturro, John Avlon	N/A
Rosetta Stone: Putin Edition. Late Show Presents: Meanwhile. John Turturro discusses The Batman. John Avlon discusses recent politics and his new book, Lincoln and the Fight for Peace.
1217	February 23, 2022	John Heilemann, Mark McKinnon & Jennifer Palmieri	Russell Howard
Romansplaining with Stephen Colbert: Dating Apps Edition. John Heilemann, Mark McKinnon & Jennifer Palmieri discuss recent politics. Russell Howard gives a stand-up performance.
1218	February 24, 2022	Julia Ioffe, Thomas Lennon	Tears for Fears
Stephen acknowledges Russia's invasion of Ukraine. Julia Ioffe discusses recent politics. Thomas Lennon discusses Reno 911! Defunded and his new book, Ronan Boyle Into the Strangeplace. Tears for Fears performs "Break the Man" from their album The Tipping Point.
1219	February 25, 2022	Sam Waterston, Sophia Bush	N/A
Cargo Unchained: Cookies, Games, & Death Edition. Rescue Dog Rescue with John Oliver (new footage from February 15 episode). Sam Waterston discusses Law & Order and his career in acting. Sophia Bush discusses Good Sam and her podcast, Work in Progress.
1220	February 28, 2022	Bob Odenkirk	N/A
Stephen acknowledges the exit of showrunner Chris Licht. Bob Odenkirk discusses Better Call Saul and his new book, Comedy Comedy Comedy Drama.

=== March ===
No.	Original release date	Guest(s)	Musical/entertainment guest(s)
1221	March 1, 2022	Senator Bernie Sanders	Big Thief
Special live episode following the State of the Union Address. Late Show Presents: Meanwhile. Senator Bernie Sanders discusses the State of the Union Address and recent politics. Big Thief performs "Simulation Swarm" from their album Dragon New Warm Mountain I Believe in You.
1222	March 2, 2022	Andy Serkis, Fiona Hill	N/A
Stephen celebrates the 15th anniversary of Americone Dream (special appearances by Josh Groban and Sara Bareilles). Andy Serkis discusses The Batman. Fiona Hill discusses recent politics and her new book, There Is Nothing for You Here.
1223	March 3, 2022	Kyle MacLachlan, Arian Moayed	Pusha T
Late Show Presents: Meanwhile. Kyle MacLachlan discusses Joe vs. Carole. Arian Moayed discusses Succession and Inventing Anna. Pusha T performs "Diet Coke" from his album It's Almost Dry.
1224	March 7, 2022	Anderson Cooper, Sutton Foster	N/A
Nyetflix. Live from Lviv, Anderson Cooper discusses Russia's invasion of Ukraine. Sutton Foster discusses The Music Man and her new book, Hooked.
1225	March 8, 2022	John C. Reilly, Kristin Chenoweth	N/A
Late Show Presents: Meanwhile. Smile File. John C. Reilly discusses Winning Time: The Rise of the Lakers Dynasty. Kristin Chenoweth discusses her new book, What Will I Do with My Love Today?
1226	March 9, 2022	Ambassador Michael McFaul, Denée Benton	Father John Misty
Ambassador Michael McFaul discusses Russia's invasion of Ukraine. Denée Benton discusses The Gilded Age. Father John Misty performs "Goodbye Mr. Blue" from his album Chloë and the Next 20th Century.
1227	March 10, 2022	Ambassador Marie Yovanovitch, Martha Stewart	Rex Orange County
Late Show Presents: Meanwhile. Ambassador Marie Yovanovitch discusses Russia's invasion of Ukraine and her new book, Lessons from the Edge. Martha Stewart takes "The Colbert Questionert" (new footage from February 2 episode). Rex Orange County performs "One in a Million" from his album Who Cares?
1228	March 11, 2022	Aidy Bryant	Alex Edelman
"Clothing Time". The Late Show's Rockin' 2 Year Coronavirus PandemiVersary: A Look Back. NFT Heist. Aidy Bryant discusses Human Resources. Late Show Presents: Audience Questions. Alex Edelman gives a stand-up performance.
1229	March 14, 2022	Sandra Bullock	Billy Strings
Late Show Presents: Meanwhile. Meanwhile Presents: Guess Which State This Happened In? Never Mind It's Florida. Sandra Bullock discusses The Lost City. Billy Strings performs "Know It All" from his album Renewal.
1230	March 15, 2022	Anne Hathaway, Da'Vine Joy Randolph	N/A
Tweet Fighter. Anne Hathaway discusses WeCrashed. Da'Vine Joy Randolph discusses The Lost City.
1231	March 16, 2022	Michael Bublé, Rose Matafeo	Michael Bublé featuring Jon Batiste and Stay Human
Late Show Presents: Meanwhile. Meanwhile Update. Michael Bublé discusses his new album, Higher. Rose Matafeo discusses Starstruck. Michael Bublé performs "Make You Feel My Love", with Jon Batiste and Stay Human providing musical accompaniment.
1232	March 28, 2022	Chris Wallace, Wilmer Valderrama	N/A
Chris Wallace discusses recent politics and his new show, Who's Talking to Chris Wallace? Wilmer Valderrama discusses NCIS.
1233	March 29, 2022	Sandra Bullock, Hannah Gadsby	Buffalo Nichols
Late Show Presents: Meanwhile. Sandra Bullock takes "The Colbert Questionert" (new footage from March 14 episode). Hannah Gadsby discusses her new book, Ten Steps to Nanette. Buffalo Nichols performs "Lost & Lonesome" from his self-titled album.
1234	March 30, 2022	Elle Fanning, Ben Schwartz	N/A
Yacht Gacht Cacht... Jackpacht! Isaiah Sharkey sits in with the band and provides musical accompaniment. Cyborgasm. Elle Fanning discusses The Girl from Plainville. Ben Schwartz discusses Sonic the Hedgehog 2.
1235	March 31, 2022	James McAvoy	Arlo Parks
Gettin' Slappy Wit It. CBS Watercooler. Isaiah Sharkey sits in with the band and provides musical accompaniment. Great-Ish Women of History (special appearance by Jane Krakowski). James McAvoy discusses Cyrano de Bergerac. Arlo Parks performs "Softly".

=== April ===
No.	Original release date	Guest(s)	Musical/entertainment guest(s)
1236	April 1, 2022	Ken Burns & Mandy Patinkin	N/A
Late Show Presents: Meanwhile. The Late Show Presents: Maybe Coming Soon, with John C. Reilly (new footage from March 8 episode). Ken Burns & Mandy Patinkin discuss Benjamin Franklin.
1237	April 4, 2022	Shaquille O'Neal, Mayim Bialik	N/A
Stephen acknowledges Jon Batiste's big night at the 64th Annual Grammy Awards. Randy Runyon sits in with the band and provides musical accompaniment. Shaquille O'Neal discusses his new book, Shaq's Family Style and steps into the kitchen with Stephen. Mayim Bialik discusses As They Made Us.
1238	April 5, 2022	Oscar Isaac	N/A
"2014: 2 – 2022 Fast, 2022 Familiar: Back to the Recent POTUS Trap: The Bleakquel". Southern Hospitality Cam. Jon Batiste discusses his big night at the 64th Annual Grammy Awards. Oscar Isaac discusses Dune and Moon Knight.
1239	April 6, 2022	Anderson Cooper	Thomas Rhett
Late Show Presents: Meanwhile. Anderson Cooper discusses recent politics. Thomas Rhett performs "Angels" from his album Where We Started.
1240	April 7, 2022	Pete Holmes, Elizabeth Alexander	N/A
Seditionist Round Up Roundup. Space News: Space Health. Space News: Hubble Telescope News. Space News: Unexpected Alien Phenomena. Pete Holmes discusses How We Roll. Elizabeth Alexander discusses recent politics and her new book, The Trayvon Generation.
1241	April 11, 2022	Chance the Rapper, Beanie Feldstein	Chance the Rapper
Chance the Rapper discusses his new single, "Child of God". Beanie Feldstein discusses Funny Girl. Chance the Rapper performs "Child of God".
1242	April 12, 2022	Molly Shannon, Representative Cori Bush	N/A
Stephen acknowledges the mass shooting on the New York City Subway in Brooklyn. Late Show Presents: Meanwhile. Molly Shannon discusses her new book, Hello, Molly! Representative Cori Bush discusses recent politics.
1243	April 13, 2022	Claire Foy & Paul Bettany	Bright Eyes
Bird Poop Fact Check. Claire Foy & Paul Bettany discuss A Very British Scandal. Stephen acknowledges the death of Gilbert Gottfried. A sneak preview at season 2 of Bridgerton (special appearance by Gilbert Gottfried; segment rebroadcast from June 21, 2021 episode). Bright Eyes perform "Dance and Sing" from their album Down in the Weeds, Where the World Once Was.
1244	April 14, 2022	Hugh Laurie	IDLES
Late Show Presents: Meanwhile. Hugh Laurie discusses Why Didn't They Ask Evans? IDLES perform "Crawl!" from their album Crawler.
1245	April 15, 2022	Josh Brolin	The Who
Idiot Update. Fox News Weather News. First Drafts: Easter Cards, with Stephen's wife, Evie. Josh Brolin discusses Dune and Outer Range. The Who performs "Behind Blue Eyes" from their 1971 album Who's Next.
1246	April 18, 2022	Julia Roberts	Wilco featuring Aizuri Quartet
Late Show Presents: Meanwhile. Julia Roberts discusses Gaslit. Wilco performs "Poor Places" from their 2001 album Yankee Hotel Foxtrot, featuring Aizuri Quartet.
1247	April 19, 2022	Neil deGrasse Tyson	Emmy Blotnick
Rescue Dog Rescue with Oscar Isaac (new footage from April 5 episode). Neil deGrasse Tyson discusses his new book, Welcome to the Universe in 3D. Emmy Blotnick gives a stand-up performance.
1248	April 20, 2022	Alexander Skarsgård, Jack White	Jack White
Netflix Lite. Alexander Skarsgård discusses The Northman. Jack White discusses his new album, Fear of the Dawn. Jack White performs "What's the Trick?"

=== May ===
No.	Original release date	Guest(s)	Musical/entertainment guest(s)
1249	May 2, 2022	Jon Bernthal, Alton Brown	N/A
Stephen Doesn't Care About Your Kids (special appearance by Kareem Abdul-Jabbar). Jon Bernthal discusses We Own This City. Alton Brown steps into the kitchen with Stephen and discusses his new book, Good Eats 4: The Final Years.
1250	May 3, 2022	Emily Bazelon; José Andrés & Ron Howard	Lucius featuring Sheryl Crow & Celisse Henderson
Emily Bazelon discusses recent politics. José Andrés & Ron Howard discuss We Feed People and World Central Kitchen. Lucius performs "Dance Around It" from their album Second Nature, featuring Sheryl Crow & Celisse Henderson and with Stay Human providing musical accompaniment.
1251	May 4, 2022	Glenn Close, Sheryl Crow	N/A
First Drafts: Mother's Day Cards, with Stephen's wife, Evie. Glenn Close discusses Tehran. Sheryl Crow discusses Sheryl.
1252	May 5, 2022	Daniel Craig, Matt Walsh	Joy Oladokun
Stephen presents new items from his own lifestyle brand, Covetton House. Daniel Craig takes "The Colbert Questionert" (new footage from February 16 episode). Matt Walsh discusses Unplugging. Joy Oladokun performs "Purple Haze".
1253	May 6, 2022	Chris O'Donnell, Elvis Costello	N/A
Late Show Presents: Meanwhile. Chris O'Donnell discusses NCIS: Los Angeles and Come Dance with Me. Elvis Costello takes "The Colbert Questionert" (new footage from January 21 episode).
1254	May 16, 2022	Mark Esper, Judd Apatow	N/A
Stephen acknowledges the mass shooting in Buffalo, New York. Mark Esper discusses recent politics and his new book, A Sacred Oath. Judd Apatow discusses George Carlin's American Dream.
1255	May 17, 2022	Ricky Gervais	Trombone Shorty
Late Show Presents: Meanwhile. Ricky Gervais discusses SuperNature, his new stand-up special. Trombone Shorty performs "Lifted" from his album of the same name. Late Show Presents: Rehearsal Rewind.
1256	May 18, 2022	Secretary of State Antony Blinken	TWICE
Election Night In 10% of America '22. Stephen Colbert's Mean Tweets. Breaking Small-Town Arkansas Water Tower News. Secretary of State Antony Blinken discusses recent politics. TWICE performs "The Feels" from their album Formula of Love: O+T=＜3.
1257	May 19, 2022	Mike Myers, Kim Min-ha	Beach House
Curious George and the Mysterious Illness. Monkeypox! GoTuckYourself. Mike Myers discusses The Pentaverate and the 30th anniversary of Wayne's World. Kim Min-ha discusses Pachinko. Beach House performs "Superstar" from their album Once Twice Melody.
1258	May 20, 2022	Shaquille O'Neal, Sebastian Stan	Sharon Van Etten
Late Show Presents: Meanwhile. Shaquille O’Neal takes "The Colbert Questionert" (new footage from April 4 episode). Sebastian Stan discusses Pam & Tommy. Sharon Van Etten performs "Mistakes" from her album We've Been Going About This All Wrong.
1259	May 23, 2022	Jennifer Connelly, Patti LuPone	Patti LuPone
Planet of the Monkeypox. Jennifer Connelly discusses Top Gun: Maverick. Patti LuPone discusses Company. Patti LuPone performs "The Ladies Who Lunch".
1260	May 24, 2022	Prime Minister of New Zealand Jacinda Ardern	Punch Brothers
Stephen acknowledges the mass shooting in Uvalde, Texas. Rise of the Planet of the Monkeypox. Late Show Presents: Meanwhile. Prime Minister Jacinda Ardern discusses recent politics. Punch Brothers perform "Any Old Time" from their album Hell on Church Street.
1261	May 25, 2022	Michael Che, Admiral James Stavridis	N/A
Tivon Pennicott sits in with the band and provides musical accompaniment. Space News: Billionaires in Space! Space News: Doorway-on-Mars News. Space News: Space Sex. Space News: Space Shopping. Michael Che discusses That Damn Michael Che. Admiral James Stavridis discusses recent politics and his new book, To Risk It All.
1262	May 26, 2022	Josh Brolin, Hugh Dancy	N/A
Tivon Pennicott and Angie Swan sit in with the band and provide musical accompaniment. Late Show Presents: Meanwhile. Josh Brolin takes "The Colbert Questionert" (new footage from April 15 episode). Hugh Dancy discusses Downton Abbey: A New Era.

=== June ===
No.	Original release date	Guest(s)	Musical/entertainment guest(s)
1263	June 6, 2022	Jake Tapper, Joel Kim Booster	N/A
Gay Planet Earth. Breaking News. Jake Tapper discusses recent politics. Joel Kim Booster discusses Fire Island.
1264	June 7, 2022	Robert De Niro, Rosie Perez	N/A
Late Show Presents: Meanwhile. Robert De Niro discusses the upcoming Tribeca Film Festival. Stephen and Robert De Niro acknowledge the death of Ray Liotta. Rosie Perez discusses Now & Then.
1265	June 8, 2022	Representative Adam Schiff, Chiwetel Ejiofor	Kurt Vile
"Shoot Us With Shotguns". Dawn of the Planet of the Monkeypox. Representative Adam Schiff discusses recent politics. Chiwetel Ejiofor discusses The Man Who Fell to Earth. Kurt Vile performs "Mount Airy Hill (Way Gone)" from his album Watch My Moves.
1266	June 9, 2022	Jon Batiste, Simu Liu	N/A
Special live episode following the January 6 Committee public hearing. The January 6th Show. Late Show Presents: Meanwhile. Jon Batiste takes the Colbert Questionert. Simu Liu discusses his new book, We Were Dreamers.
1267	June 13, 2022	Bryan Cranston, Senator Raphael Warnock	N/A
U-Heil. Late Show Presents: Meanwhile. Bryan Cranston discusses Jerry & Marge Go Large. Senator Raphael Warnock discusses recent politics and his new book, A Way Out of No Way.
1268	June 14, 2022	Bob Woodward & Carl Bernstein	Bonnie Raitt
Bob Woodward & Carl Bernstein discuss recent politics and the upcoming 50th anniversaries of the Watergate scandal and their book, All the President's Men. Bonnie Raitt performs "Blame It on Me" from her album Just Like That...
1269	June 15, 2022	Emma Thompson, Tom Segura	N/A
First Drafts: Father's Day Cards, with Stephen's wife, Evie. Emma Thompson discusses Good Luck to You, Leo Grande. Tom Segura discusses his new book, I'd Like to Play Alone, Please.
1270	June 16, 2022	Tom Hanks	Regina Spektor
Late Show Family Meeting with Tom Hanks. Tom Hanks discusses Elvis. Regina Spektor performs "Becoming All Alone" from her album Home, Before and After.
1271	June 20, 2022	Senator Cory Booker	The Lumineers
Cyborgasm. Senator Cory Booker discusses recent politics. The Lumineers perform "A.M. Radio" from their album Brightside.
1272	June 21, 2022	Werner Herzog	Roger Waters
Fast Earl's Fake Elector Depot. Late Show Presents: Meanwhile. Rescue Dog Rescue with Emma Thompson (new footage from June 15 episode). Werner Herzog discusses his new book, The Twilight World. Roger Waters performs a medley of "The Happiest Days of Our Lives" and "Another Brick in the Wall (Part 3)".
1273	June 22, 2022	Taika Waititi, David Sedaris	N/A
War for the Planet of the Monkeypox. Taika Waititi discusses Thor: Love and Thunder and his upcoming Star Wars film. David Sedaris discusses his new book, Happy-Go-Lucky.
1274	June 23, 2022	Beto O'Rourke, Matilda Lawler	N/A
Stranger Hearings. Jeffery Miller and Alphonso Horne sit in with the band and provide musical accompaniment. Beto O'Rourke discusses recent politics. Matilda Lawler discusses Station Eleven.
1275	June 27, 2022	Wanda Sykes, Ronan Farrow	N/A
Late Show Presents: Meanwhile. Wanda Sykes discusses The Upshaws. Ronan Farrow discusses Endangered.
1276	June 28, 2022	Representative Alexandria Ocasio-Cortez	Jimmie Allen
Representative Alexandria Ocasio-Cortez discusses recent politics. Jimmie Allen performs "Down Home" from his album Tulip Drive.
1277	June 29, 2022	Representative Adam Kinzinger, Karl Urban	Stephen Sanchez
Representative Adam Kinzinger discusses recent politics. Karl Urban discusses The Boys. Stephen Sanchez performs "Until I Found You" from his EP Easy On My Eyes.
1278	June 30, 2022	Heidi Klum, Ibram X. Kendi	N/A
Crotch Wotch. The Late Show's Pride Month News Parade. Heidi Klum discusses Making the Cut and America's Got Talent. Ibram X. Kendi discusses his new books, How to Raise an Antiracist and Goodnight Racism.

=== July ===
No.	Original release date	Guest(s)	Musical/entertainment guest(s)
1279	July 18, 2022	Billy Crystal, Paul Hollywood	N/A
Billy Crystal discusses Mr. Saturday Night. Paul Hollywood steps into the kitchen with Stephen and discusses his new book, Bake.
1280	July 19, 2022	Ethan Hawke	Courtney Barnett
Late Show Presents: Meanwhile. Ethan Hawke discusses The Last Movie Stars. Courtney Barnett performs "Before You Gotta Go" from her album Things Take Time, Take Time.
1281	July 20, 2022	Ice-T, Michael Pollan	N/A
Breaking Wind News. Rachael Price sits in with the band and provides musical accompaniment. Stephen Colbert Presents: That's Yeet: Dabbing on Fleek, Fam! Ice-T discusses his new book, Split Decision. Michael Pollan discusses his new book, This Is Your Mind on Plants.
1282	July 21, 2022	Chris Hayes, Jack White	Jack White
Special live episode following the January 6 Committee public hearing. Chris Hayes discusses recent politics. The Late Show Presents: Maybe Dropping Soon, with Jack White (new footage from April 20 episode). Jack White performs "If I Die Tomorrow" from his album Entering Heaven Alive.
1283	July 25, 2022	Representative Jamie Raskin	Death Cab for Cutie
Everybody's Got Something to Hide Except Me and My Monkeypox. St. Vincent sits in with the band and provides musical accompaniment. Cyborgasm. Representative Jamie Raskin discusses recent politics. Death Cab for Cutie performs "Here to Forever" from their forthcoming album Asphalt Meadows.
1284	July 26, 2022	Charlamagne tha God, Brett Gelman	N/A
5 Little Monkeypox Jumping on the Bed. St. Vincent sits in with the band and provides musical accompaniment. Late Show Presents: Meanwhile. Charlamagne tha God discusses recent politics and Hell of A Week. Brett Gelman discusses Stranger Things.
1285	July 27, 2022	Amanda Seyfried, Stephen Merchant	Louis Cato and Stay Human
St. Vincent sits in with the band and provides musical accompaniment. Amanda Seyfried discusses The Dropout. Stephen Merchant discusses The Outlaws. Louis Cato performs "Look Within" from his album Starting Now, with Stay Human providing musical accompaniment.
1286	July 28, 2022	Jonathan Karl, B. J. Novak	N/A
Late Show Presents: Meanwhile. St. Vincent sits in with the band and provides musical accompaniment. Jonathan Karl discusses recent politics and his new book, Betrayal. B.J. Novak discusses Vengeance.

=== August ===
No.	Original release date	Guest(s)	Musical/entertainment guest(s)
1287	August 1, 2022	Patton Oswalt, Secretary Jennifer Granholm	N/A
James Taylor and Larry Goldings sit in with the band and provide musical accompaniment. Late Show Presents: Meanwhile. Patton Oswalt discusses I Love My Dad. Secretary Jennifer Granholm discusses recent politics.
1288	August 2, 2022	Jon Favreau, Jon Lovett & Tommy Vietor	Bianca Cristovao
James Taylor and Larry Goldings sit in with the band and provide musical accompaniment. Wasted Time: The Rise and Fall of Clock App for iPhone. Jon Favreau, Jon Lovett & Tommy Vietor discuss recent politics. Bianca Cristovao gives a stand-up performance.
1289	August 3, 2022	Ron Howard, Morfydd Clark	N/A
James Taylor and Larry Goldings sit in with the band and provide musical accompaniment. Late Show Presents: Meanwhile. Meanwhile Presents: Porcine-While. Ron Howard discusses Thirteen Lives. Morfydd Clark discusses The Lord of the Rings: The Rings of Power.
1290	August 4, 2022	James Taylor, Colman Domingo	N/A
Fact-Check Check! James Taylor and Larry Goldings sit in with the band and provide musical accompaniment. Breaking News. James Taylor discusses his career in music. Colman Domingo discusses Euphoria and Rustin.
1291	August 8, 2022	Mindy Kaling, Senator Chris Murphy	N/A
Joe Walsh sits in with the band and provides musical accompaniment. Mindy Kaling discusses Never Have I Ever. Senator Chris Murphy discusses recent politics.
1292	August 9, 2022	Ben Stiller, D'Arcy Carden	N/A
Joe Walsh sits in with the band and provides musical accompaniment. Space News: Moon City News. Space News: Cured Space Meat. Space News: England in Space. Ben Stiller discusses Severance. D'Arcy Carden discusses A League of Their Own.
1293	August 10, 2022	Kieran Culkin	Run the Jewels
Joe Walsh sits in with the band and provides musical accompaniment. Late Show Presents: Meanwhile. Kieran Culkin discusses Succession. Run the Jewels performs "A Few Words for the Firing Squad (Radiation)" from their album RTJ4.
1294	August 11, 2022	White House Press Secretary Karine Jean-Pierre, Tatiana Maslany	N/A
Joe Walsh sits in with the band and provides musical accompaniment. Severance: The Lost Scenes of Steve C. (special appearances by Tramell Tillman, John Turturro and Adam Scott). Stephen announces the departure of bandleader Jon Batiste. White House Press Secretary Karine Jean-Pierre discusses recent politics. Tatiana Maslany discusses She-Hulk: Attorney at Law.

=== September ===
No.	Original release date	Guest(s)	Musical/entertainment guest(s)
1295	September 6, 2022	Alex Wagner, Roy Wood Jr.	N/A
Cyborgasm. Alex Wagner discusses recent politics and Alex Wagner Tonight. Roy Wood Jr. discusses Confess, Fletch and his podcast, Roy's Job Fair.
1296	September 7, 2022	Gayle King & Tony Dokoupil, Betty Gilpin	N/A
Late Show Presents: Meanwhile. Gayle King & Tony Dokoupil discuss the 1-year anniversary of CBS Mornings. Betty Gilpin discusses Gaslit, Mrs. Davis and her new book, All the Women In My Brain.
1297	September 8, 2022	Ryan Reynolds & Rob McElhenney	James Taylor
Stephen and James Taylor update Carole King's "You've Got a Friend". Ryan Reynolds & Rob McElhenney discuss Welcome to Wrexham. James Taylor performs "Mexico", with his family and Louis Cato and the Late Show Band providing musical accompaniment.
1298	September 13, 2022	Robert De Niro, Ethan Hawke	St. Vincent
Previously taped episode. A look back at the lead up to January 6th. Robert De Niro takes "The Colbert Questionert" (new footage from June 7 episode). Ethan Hawke takes "The Colbert Questionert" (new footage from July 19 episode). St. Vincent performs "Down" from her album Daddy's Home, with Louis Cato and the Late Show Band providing musical accompaniment.
1299	September 14, 2022	Steve Carell	Phoenix featuring Ezra Koenig
Stephen acknowledges the death of Queen Elizabeth II. The Late Show Too Much Exposition Theater, with Steve Carell. Steve Carell discusses The Patient and If. Phoenix performs "Tonight" from their album Alpha Zulu, featuring Ezra Koenig.
1300	September 15, 2022	Queen Latifah, Nina Totenberg	N/A
Jack DeBoe sits in with the band and provides musical accompaniment. Late Show Presents: Meanwhile. Meanwhile Presents: Anal-Bead-While. Queen Latifah discusses The Equalizer, the upcoming 20th anniversary of Chicago and End of the Road. Nina Totenberg discusses recent politics and her new book, Dinners with Ruth.
1301	September 19, 2022	Ana de Armas, Ken Burns	Sudan Archives
Jack DeBoe and Randy Runyon sit in with the band and provide musical accompaniment. Ana de Armas discusses Blonde. Ken Burns discusses The U.S. and the Holocaust. Sudan Archives performs "Selfish Soul" from her album Natural Brown Prom Queen.
1302	September 20, 2022	Billy Eichner, USAID Administrator Samantha Power	N/A
Stephen acknowledges the impact of Hurricane Fiona in Puerto Rico. Late Show Presents: Meanwhile. Billy Eichner discusses Bros. Samantha Power discusses recent politics.
1303	September 21, 2022	Olivia Wilde, Ukraine's Foreign Minister Dmytro Kuleba	N/A
Olivia Wilde discusses Don't Worry Darling. Ukraine's Foreign Minister Dmytro Kuleba discusses Russia's ongoing invasion of Ukraine.
1304	September 22, 2022	Neil deGrasse Tyson, Phil Rosenthal	N/A
Breaking Squirrel News. Neil deGrasse Tyson discusses his new book, Starry Messenger: Cosmic Perspectives on Civilization. Phil Rosenthal discusses Somebody Feed Phil.
1305	September 26, 2022	Sigourney Weaver, Zeeko Zaki	N/A
Late Show Presents: Meanwhile. Sigourney Weaver discusses Avatar: The Way of Water and The Good House. Zeeko Zaki discusses FBI.
1306	September 27, 2022	Samuel L. Jackson, Clarissa Ward	N/A
Stephen acknowledges the impact of Hurricane Ian in Florida. Midwestern Dad. Samuel L. Jackson discusses The Piano Lesson. Clarissa Ward discusses recent politics and her book, On All Fronts: The Education of a Journalist.
1307	September 28, 2022	Anderson Cooper, Sosie Bacon	N/A
Gracie and Clyde Lawrence sit in with the band and provide musical accompaniment. Anderson Cooper discusses recent politics and his podcast, All There Is. Sosie Bacon discusses Smile.
1308	September 29, 2022	George Clooney	Alex G
Late Show Presents: Meanwhile. George Clooney discusses Ticket to Paradise. Alex G performs "Miracles" from his album God Save the Animals.

=== October ===
No.	Original release date	Guest(s)	Musical/entertainment guest(s)
1309	October 3, 2022	Speaker Nancy Pelosi, Armando Iannucci	Dermot Kennedy
Watergate. Speaker Nancy Pelosi discusses recent politics. Armando Iannucci discusses Avenue 5. Dermot Kennedy performs "Dreamer" from his upcoming album Sonder.
1310	October 4, 2022	Maggie Haberman, Tyler Templeton from Tooning Out the News	N/A
Hallmark Cards: The Herschel Walker Collection. Late Show Presents: Meanwhile. Maggie Haberman discusses her new book, Confidence Man. Tooning Out the News' Tyler Templeton reports live from Mar-A-Lago.
1311	October 5, 2022	Dr. Anthony Fauci, Cody Keenan	N/A
Dr. Anthony Fauci discusses the COVID-19 pandemic. Doctor's Orders, with Dr. Anthony Fauci. Dr. Anthony Fauci gets his COVID-19 booster shot. Cody Keenan discusses his new book, Grace: President Obama and Ten Days in the Battle for America.
1312	October 6, 2022	Cate Blanchett, Domhnall Gleeson	N/A
First Drafts: Anniversary Cards, with Stephen's wife, Evie. Cate Blanchett discusses Tár. Domhnall Gleeson discusses The Patient.
1313	October 10, 2022	Colin Farrell & Brendan Gleeson, Paul Mecurio	Paul Mecurio
Late Show Presents: Meanwhile. Meanwhile Presents: It's-A-Mean-A-Whil-A. Colin Farrell and Brendan Gleeson discuss The Banshees of Inisherin. Paul Mecurio discusses his podcast, Inside Out, and gives a stand-up performance.
1314	October 11, 2022	John Lithgow, Wendell Pierce	N/A
A surprise visit by Rudy Giuliani (John Lithgow). John Lithgow discusses Everything's Fine. Wendell Pierce discusses Death of a Salesman.
1315	October 12, 2022	George Stephanopoulos, Marcia Gay Harden	N/A
Late Show Presents: Meanwhile. George Stephanopoulos discusses Power Trip and recent politics. Marcia Gay Harden discusses So Help Me Todd.
1316	October 13, 2022	Jeremy Strong, Ed Sheeran	Ed Sheeran
The Flynnstones. Jeremy Strong discusses Armageddon Time. Ed Sheeran discusses his +–=÷x Tour. Ed Sheeran performs "Shivers" from his album =.
1317	October 24, 2022	Secretary of Transportation Pete Buttigieg, Ina Garten	N/A
Late Show Presents: Meanwhile. Secretary of Transportation Pete Buttigieg discusses recent politics. Ina Garten discusses her new book, Go-To Dinners.
1318	October 25, 2022	Eddie Redmayne, George R. R. Martin	N/A
Will new writer George R. R. Martin finish the monologue on time? Rich, Please! Eddie Redmayne discusses The Good Nurse. George R. R. Martin discusses his new book, The Rise of the Dragon, and his work for Elden Ring.
1319	October 26, 2022	Aubrey Plaza, Nikole Hannah-Jones	N/A
Late Show Presents: Meanwhile. Meanwhile Presents: Behind the Scenes-While. Aubrey Plaza discusses The White Lotus and Megalopolis. Aubrey Plaza plays "Tea at the Plaza". Nikole Hannah-Jones discusses The 1619 Project and her book, The 1619 Project: A New Origin Story.
1320	October 27, 2022	Kerry Washington	Joe Walsh
Late Show Presents: Kids Pitch – Halloween Edition. Inside Goodbye: Hell-O! (special appearances by Tim Meadows, Jonathan Groff, Natalia Dyer, John Oliver, Rhea Seehorn, Andi Matichak, Britt Lower, Patrick Wilson, Imagine Dragons and Paul Walter Hauser). Kerry Washington discusses The School for Good and Evil. Joe Walsh performs "Rocky Mountain Way" from his 1973 album The Smoker You Drink, the Player You Get, with Louis Cato and the Late Show Band (joined on piano by longtime Walsh collaborator Joe Vitale) providing musical accompaniment.
1321	October 31, 2022	Jennifer Hudson, Zosia Mamet	N/A
Cyborgasm. Jennifer Hudson discusses The Jennifer Hudson Show. Zosia Mamet discusses her new book, My First Popsicle.

=== November ===
No.	Original release date	Guest(s)	Musical/entertainment guest(s)
1322	November 1, 2022	Matthew Perry, James Taylor	N/A
Late Show Presents: Meanwhile. Matthew Perry discusses his new book, Friends, Lovers, and the Big Terrible Thing. James Taylor takes "The Colbert Questionert" (new footage from August 4 episode).
1323	November 2, 2022	Senator Elizabeth Warren, Secretary Ernest Moniz	N/A
Senator Elizabeth Warren discusses recent politics. Secretary Ernest Moniz discusses Russia's ongoing invasion of Ukraine.
1324	November 3, 2022	Bono	Bono
Danae Greenfield sits in with the band and provides musical accompaniment. A Rare Correkshun. Bono discusses his career in music, recent politics and his new book, Surrender. Bono performs a special arrangement of U2's "With or Without You", from the band's 1987 album The Joshua Tree.
1325	November 7, 2022	John Oliver	The cast of The Lion King
Stephen reveals Chris Evans as People's "Sexiest Man Alive" 2022. John Oliver discusses recent politics. The cast of The Lion King performs "Circle of Life".
1326	November 8, 2022	John Dickerson, Mike Birbiglia	N/A
Special live episode following the Midterm elections. Stranger Midterms. CBS Midterms Projection Coop. John Dickerson discusses the Midterm results. Mike Birbiglia discusses The Old Man and the Pool, his new one-man show.
1327	November 9, 2022	Bono, Rose McIver	N/A
Late Show's Just One Question: Black Panther Edition (special appearances by Danai Gurira, Lupita Nyong'o, Letitia Wright, Tenoch Huerta and Angela Bassett). Bono takes "The Colbert Questionert" (new footage from November 3 episode). Rose McIver discusses Ghosts.
1328	November 10, 2022	Emily Blunt, George Saunders	N/A
Late Show Presents: Meanwhile. Emily Blunt discusses The English. George Saunders discusses his new book, Liberation Day.
1329	November 14, 2022	Michelle Obama	Stromae
Late Show Family Meeting with Michelle Obama. Michelle Obama discusses recent politics and her new book, The Light We Carry. Stromae performs "L'enfer" from his album Multitude.
1330	November 15, 2022	Jon Stewart	LCD Soundsystem
Late Show Presents: Meanwhile. Jon Stewart discusses recent politics and The Problem. LCD Soundsystem performs "New Body Rhumba", from the film White Noise.
1331	November 16, 2022	Michael Shannon, Tig Notaro	N/A
The Late Show's Autumntacular Movie FestiFall. Michael Shannon discusses George & Tammy and Eric Larue. Tig Notaro discusses Pickled.
1332	November 17, 2022	Michelle Williams; Dierks Bentley & Phil Keoghan	Dierks Bentley
No Context Herschel Walker. Late Show Presents: Meanwhile. Michelle Williams discusses The Fabelmans. Dierks Bentley & Phil Keoghan discuss Pickled. Dierks Bentley performs "Gold".
1333	November 21, 2022	Daniel Craig	Josh Johnson
Stephen acknowledges the mass shooting in Colorado Springs, Colorado. Daniel Craig discusses Glass Onion: A Knives Out Mystery. Josh Johnson gives a stand-up performance.
1334	November 22, 2022	Cate Blanchett, Paul Dano	Holly Humberstone
The Late Show Presents: Stephen Colbert's Thanksgiving Turkey Tips (segment rebroadcast from November 22, 2016 episode). Cate Blanchett takes "The Colbert Questionert" (new footage from October 6 episode). Paul Dano discusses The Fabelmans. Holly Humberstone performs "Can You Afford to Lose Me?" from her album of the same name.
1335	November 23, 2022	Jake Gyllenhaal, Elizabeth Debicki	N/A
Everybody's Got Stuffing To Hide Expect Me and My Turkey: The Songs of Thanksgiving (special appearance by Michael Shannon). #ColbertSmallBizBump: NCIS Cleveland: Fine Points on Larchmere Blvd. (special appearances by Gerald McRaney, Caleb Castille, Medalion Rahimi, Daniela Ruah, Eric Christian Olsen and Drew Carey). Late Show Presents: Meanwhile. Jake Gyllenhaal discusses Strange World and Road House. Elizabeth Debicki discusses The Crown.
1336	November 28, 2022	Don Lemon, Gabrielle Union	N/A
Late Show Presents: Meanwhile. Don Lemon discusses CNN This Morning. Gabrielle Union discusses The Inspection.
1337	November 29, 2022	Sally Field, Maria Ressa	N/A
Huntertones' Chris Ott and Dan White sit in with the band and provide musical accompaniment. Cyborgasm. Sally Field discusses Spoiler Alert. Maria Ressa discusses recent politics and her new book, How to Stand Up to a Dictator.
1338	November 30, 2022	Secretary Janet Yellen, Rob Delaney	N/A
Late Show Presents: Meanwhile. Secretary Janet Yellen discusses recent politics. Rob Delaney discusses his new book, A Heart That Works.

=== December ===
No.	Original release date	Guest(s)	Musical/entertainment guest(s)
1339	December 1, 2022	John Krasinski, Sarah Polley	N/A
Christmas Wish Cam. Late Show Intern Check-In. John Krasinski discusses Jack Ryan. Sarah Polley discusses Women Talking.
1340	December 5, 2022	John David Washington, Naomi Osaka	Spoon
Late Show Presents: Meanwhile. John David Washington discusses The Piano Lesson. Naomi Osaka discusses her new book, The Way Champs Play. Spoon performs "Wild" from their album Lucifer on the Sofa.
1341	December 6, 2022	N/A	N/A
The Late Show Presents: Red, White, & Greenland! Stephen Cold-Bear is Lost in Space Force (special appearance by Sturgill Simpson). The Late Show Presents: Audience Questions: Greenland Edition.
1342	December 7, 2022	Mariah Carey, Kumail Nanjiani	N/A
Mariah Carey takes "The Colbert Questionert". Kumail Nanjiani discusses Welcome to Chippendales.
1343	December 8, 2022	Alicia Keys, Eddie Izzard	Alicia Keys
Late Show Presents: Meanwhile. Alicia Keys discusses her new album, Santa Baby. Eddie Izzard discusses Great Expectations. Alicia Keys performs "Santa Baby".
1344	December 12, 2022	Common, Lily Collins	N/A
Late Show Presents: Meanwhile. Meanwhile Update. Common discusses Between Riverside and Crazy. Lily Collins discusses Emily in Paris.
1345	December 13, 2022	RuPaul	Ed Sheeran
The Late Show Presents: "A Very Cold War Christmas". RuPaul discusses RuPaul's Drag Race, Celebrity Lingo and the 30th anniversary of "Supermodel (You Better Work)". Ed Sheeran performs "Bad Habits" from his album =.
1346	December 14, 2022	Emily Blunt, José Andrés	N/A
Lalah Hathaway sits in with the band and provides musical accompaniment. Late Show Presents: Meanwhile. "A Very Goldblum Christmas" (special appearance by Jeff Goldblum). Emily Blunt takes "The Colbert Questionert" (new footage from November 10 episode). Chef José Andrés and his daughters step into the kitchen with Stephen.
1347	December 15, 2022	Andy Cohen & Anderson Cooper	Louis Cato and The Late Show Band
Rescue Dog Rescue with Andy Cohen and Anderson Cooper. Andy Cohen & Anderson Cooper discuss their upcoming coverage of CNN's New Year's Eve Live show. Louis Cato and the Late Show Band perform a special rendition of Stevie Wonder's "Someday at Christmas", with the Harlem Gospel Choir providing musical accompaniment.
