= List of The Late Show with Stephen Colbert episodes (2024) =

- No. of episodes: 153 (and 1 special)

Release
- Original network: CBS
- Original release: January 8 – December 19, 2024

Season chronology
- ← Previous; 2023 episodes Next → 2025 episodes

The following is a list of episodes of The Late Show with Stephen Colbert that aired in 2024.

== 2024 ==
=== January ===
No.	Original release date	Guest(s)	Musical/entertainment guest(s)
1434	January 8, 2024	Barbra Streisand, Taylor Tomlinson	N/A
Keep In Mind: Everyone's Fine! The Late Show Presents: The Sound of Science. Barbra Streisand takes "The Colbert Questionert" (new footage from November 13, 2023 episode). Taylor Tomlinson discusses After Midnight.
1435	January 9, 2024	Gayle King & Charles Barkley, Ebon Moss-Bachrach	N/A
Godfellas. Late Show Presents: Meanwhile. Gayle King & Charles Barkley discuss King Charles. Ebon Moss-Bachrach discusses The Bear.
1436	January 10, 2024	America Ferrera, Reneé Rapp	N/A
Cyborgasm. Cyborgasm Presents: Cybarmgarmsm. America Ferrera discusses Barbie. Reneé Rapp discusses Mean Girls.
1437	January 11, 2024	Emily Blunt, Colman Domingo	N/A
John Scofield sits in with the band and provides musical accompaniment. Late Show Presents: Meanwhile. Emily Blunt discusses Oppenheimer. Colman Domingo discusses Rustin.
1438	January 16, 2024	Nicki Minaj, Jeff Tweedy	Daniel Caesar
A special appearance by Taylor Tomlinson. Late Show Presents: Meanwhile. Nicki Minaj takes "The Colbert Questionert" (new footage from December 20, 2023 episode). Jeff Tweedy discusses his new book, World Within a Song. Daniel Caesar performs "Always" from his album Never Enough.
1439	January 17, 2024	Clive Owen, Juno Temple	The Last Dinner Party
Road to the White House and/or Big House: Donald Trump v. The People: America Decides and/or Convicts. Cyborgasm. Clive Owen discusses Monsieur Spade. Juno Temple discusses Fargo. The Last Dinner Party performs "Nothing Matters" from their upcoming album Prelude to Ecstasy.
1440	January 18, 2024	Common, Steven Wright	N/A
Late Show Presents: Meanwhile. Common discusses his new book, And Then We Rise. Steven Wright discusses his new book, Harold.
1441	January 22, 2024	Trevor Noah, Ruby Bridges	N/A
The Late Show Presents: The Twilight Zone: Just The Twists. Trevor Noah discusses his upcoming hosting gig for the 66th Grammy Awards. Ruby Bridges discusses her new book, Dear Ruby, Hear Our Hearts.
1442	January 23, 2024	André 3000, Jelani Cobb	André 3000
Late Show Presents: Meanwhile. André 3000 discusses his new album, New Blue Sun. Jelani Cobb discusses recent politics. André 3000 performs "That Night in Hawaii When I Turned into a Panther and Started Making These Low Register Purring Tones That I Couldn't Control ... Sh¥t Was Wild".
1443	January 24, 2024	Austin Butler, Kingsley Ben-Adir	N/A
The Late Show Presents: The Sound of Science. Austin Butler discusses Masters of the Air. Kingsley Ben-Adir discusses Bob Marley: One Love.
1444	January 25, 2024	Martin Scorsese	Future Islands
Road to the White House and/or Big House: Donald Trump v. The People: America Decides and/or Convicts. Stephen Colbert's Vibe Session. Martin Scorsese discusses his career as a filmmaker and Killers of the Flower Moon. Future Islands performs "The Tower" from their album People Who Aren't There Anymore.
1445	January 29, 2024	Bryan Cranston, Michele Norris	N/A
Stephen Colbert Gets All Up In Your Faith. Bryan Cranston discusses Argylle. Michele Norris discusses her new book, Our Hidden Conversations.
1446	January 30, 2024	Emma Stone, Jaime Harrison	N/A
Late Show Presents: Meanwhile. Emma Stone discusses Poor Things and The Curse. Jaime Harrison discusses recent politics.
1447	January 31, 2024	Demi Moore, Paul Walter Hauser	N/A
The Late Show's I's On Edjukashun. Demi Moore discusses Feud: Capote vs. The Swans. Paul Walter Hauser discusses Orion and the Dark.

=== February ===
No.	Original release date	Guest(s)	Musical/entertainment guest(s)
1448	February 1, 2024	John Cena, Kwame Alexander	Asake
Late Show Presents: Meanwhile. John Cena discusses Argylle. Kwame Alexander discusses his new book, This Is the Honey. Asake performs "Lonely at the Top" from his album Work of Art.
1449	February 5, 2024	Senator Elizabeth Warren	Usama Siddiquee
Stephen Colbert's interview of Maria Bartiromo's interview of Donald Trump. Late Show Presents: Meanwhile. Senator Elizabeth Warren discusses recent politics. Usama Siddiquee gives a stand-up performance.
1450	February 6, 2024	Joy-Ann Reid, A'ja Wilson	N/A
Farewell to a Friend: Stephen acknowledges the death of Toby Keith. Joy-Ann Reid discusses recent politics and her new book, Medgar and Myrlie: Medgar Evers and the Love Story That Awakened America. A'ja Wilson discusses her new book, Dear Black Girls: How to Be True to You.
1451	February 7, 2024	Christopher Nolan	N/A
Christopher Nolan discusses his career as a filmmaker and Oppenheimer.
1452	February 8, 2024	André 3000, Justin Hartley	N/A
Late Show Presents: Meanwhile. André 3000 takes "The Colbert Questionert" (new footage from January 23 episode). Justin Hartley discusses Tracker.
Special	February 11, 2024	John Krasinski, Ryan Gosling	N/A
The Late Show Super Postgame Supershow Super LVIII: special episode airing after Super Bowl LVIII. A special appearance by Jon Stewart. John Krasinski discusses IF. Ryan Gosling discusses The Fall Guy and Barbie.
1453	February 12, 2024	John Oliver	Killer Mike
Late Show Presents: Meanwhile. John Oliver discusses Last Week Tonight. Killer Mike performs "Exit 9" from his album Michael.
1454	February 13, 2024	Matt Damon, Danielle Pinnock	N/A
Space News: James Webb Telescope News. Space News: Aliens Among Us News. Space News: Hyperactive Sun News. Space News: Moon Lander News. Space News: Asteroid Sample News. Space News: Space Cleaning News. Matt Damon discusses Oppenheimer and Kiss the Future. Danielle Pinnock discusses Ghosts.
1455	February 14, 2024	Mark Wahlberg, Lily Gladstone	N/A
First Drafts: Valentine's Day Cards, with Stephen's wife, Evie. Mark Wahlberg discusses Arthur the King. Lily Gladstone discusses Killers of the Flower Moon.
1456	February 15, 2024	Billy Joel	Chappell Roan
Late Show Presents: Meanwhile. Billy Joel discusses the 10th anniversary of his residency at Madison Square Garden. Chappell Roan performs "Red Wine Supernova" from her album The Rise and Fall of a Midwest Princess.
1457	February 26, 2024	Arnold Schwarzenegger, Julio Torres	N/A
Stephen Colbert Talks Down to Children (special appearance by John Cena). Arnold Schwarzenegger takes "The Colbert Questionert" (new footage from October 9, 2023 episode). Julio Torres discusses Problemista.
1458	February 27, 2024	Josh Brolin	Amanda Gorman & Jan Vogler
Chris Ott sits in with the band and provides musical accompaniment. Late Show Presents: Meanwhile. Josh Brolin discusses Dune: Part Two. Amanda Gorman & Jan Vogler perform "What We Carry".
1459	February 28, 2024	Chris Hayes, Carrie Preston	N/A
Tivon Pennicott sits in with the band and provides musical accompaniment. What's Going On Over There? Chris Hayes discusses recent politics. Carrie Preston discusses Elsbeth.
1460	February 29, 2024	Rebecca Ferguson, Denis Villeneuve	N/A
Late Show Presents: Meanwhile. Rebecca Ferguson discusses Dune: Part Two. Denis Villeneuve discusses Dune: Part Two.

=== March ===
No.	Original release date	Guest(s)	Musical/entertainment guest(s)
1461	March 4, 2024	RuPaul, Yuval Noah Harari	N/A
Late Show Presents: Meanwhile. RuPaul discusses his new book, The House of Hidden Meanings. Yuval Noah Harari discusses his new book, Unstoppable Us.
1462	March 5, 2024	Senator Bernie Sanders	Bleachers
The Late Show Presents: The Sound of Science. Senator Bernie Sanders discusses recent politics. Bleachers performs "Jesus Is Dead" from their upcoming self-titled album.
1463	March 6, 2024	Neil deGrasse Tyson	Ariel Elias
Rich, Please! Neil deGrasse Tyson discusses his book, Starry Messenger: Cosmic Perspectives on Civilization. Ariel Elias gives a stand-up performance.
1464	March 7, 2024	John Dickerson	De La Soul
Special live episode following the State of the Union Address. Late Show Presents: Meanwhile. John Dickerson discusses the State of the Union Address and recent politics. De La Soul performs "Eye Know" from their 1989 album 3 Feet High and Rising.
1465	March 11, 2024	Kristen Stewart, Tom Hollander	N/A
Late Show Presents: Meanwhile. Kristen Stewart discusses Love Lies Bleeding. Tom Hollander discusses Feud: Capote vs. The Swans.
1466	March 12, 2024	Diane Lane, Patton Oswalt	N/A
Talkin' Sportz. Diane Lane discusses Feud: Capote vs. The Swans. Patton Oswalt discusses Ghostbusters: Frozen Empire.
1467	March 13, 2024	Paul Rudd, Cecilia Vega	N/A
The Shower Witch (special appearances by Jon Hamm and Amy Sedaris). Paul Rudd discusses Ghostbusters: Frozen Empire. Cecilia Vega discusses 60 Minutes and recent politics.
1468	March 14, 2024	Paul Simon	Paul Simon
Late Show Presents: Meanwhile. Paul Simon discusses In Restless Dreams. Paul Simon performs "Your Forgiveness" from his 2023 album Seven Psalms.
1469	March 25, 2024	Justice Stephen Breyer, Justin Thomas	N/A
Late Show Presents: Meanwhile. Justice Stephen Breyer discusses recent politics and his new book, Reading the Constitution. Justin Thomas discusses Full Swing.
1470	March 26, 2024	Carol Burnett	Waxahatchee featuring MJ Lenderman
Cyborgasm. Carol Burnett discusses Palm Royale. Waxahatchee performs "Right Back to It" from her album Tigers Blood, featuring MJ Lenderman.
1471	March 27, 2024	Liam Neeson, Fareed Zakaria	N/A
Easter Bunny Auditions. Late Show Presents: Meanwhile. Liam Neeson discusses In the Land of Saints and Sinners. Fareed Zakaria discusses recent politics and his new book, Age of Revolutions.

=== April ===
No.	Original release date	Guest(s)	Musical/entertainment guest(s)
1472	April 1, 2024	Matt Damon, Hannah Waddingham	N/A
Late Show Presents: Meanwhile. Matt Damon takes "The Colbert Questionert" (new footage from February 13 episode). Hannah Waddingham discusses The Fall Guy.
1473	April 2, 2024	Savannah Guthrie, Tim Blake Nelson	N/A
That's Gyat, Spill The Tea, Babygirl, Skibidi Toilet! Savannah Guthrie discusses recent politics and her new book, Mostly What God Does. Tim Blake Nelson discusses his book, City of Blows.
1474	April 3, 2024	Gillian Anderson, Sonequa Martin-Green	Remi Wolf
Gillian Anderson discusses Scoop. Sonequa Martin-Green discusses Star Trek: Discovery. Remi Wolf performs "Cinderella" from her upcoming album Big Ideas.
1475	April 4, 2024	Steve Buscemi, Henry Louis Gates Jr.	N/A
Aging News. Whitlock's Hot Air Balloon with Steve Buscemi. Steve Buscemi discusses The Listener. Henry Louis Gates Jr. discusses his new book, The Black Box.
1476	April 8, 2024	Rep. Alexandria Ocasio-Cortez	Tyla
Late Show Presents: Meanwhile. Representative Alexandria Ocasio-Cortez discusses recent politics. Tyla performs "Art" from her eponymous album.
1477	April 9, 2024	Maren Morris, Demetri Martin	N/A
Maren Morris discusses her new book, Addie Ant Goes on an Adventure. Demetri Martin discusses his new stand-up special, Demetri Deconstructed.
1478	April 10, 2024	Christiane Amanpour, Wilmer Valderrama	N/A
Hawk-Be-Gone Pest Control (special appearance by Tony Hawk). Late Show Presents: Meanwhile. Christiane Amanpour discusses recent politics. Wilmer Valderrama discusses NCIS and his new book, An American Story.
1479	April 15, 2024	Salman Rushdie, Anna Sawai	N/A
Terence Blanchard sits in with the band and provides musical accompaniment. Late Show Presents: Meanwhile. Salman Rushdie discusses the stabbing he suffered in 2022 and his new book, Knife. Anna Sawai discusses Shōgun.
1480	April 16, 2024	Orlando Bloom, George Takei	Maggie Rogers
Breaking Monkey News. Stephen+. Orlando Bloom discusses To the Edge. George Takei discusses his new book, My Lost Freedom. Maggie Rogers performs "The Kill" from her album Don't Forget Me.
1481	April 17, 2024	John Lithgow, Doris Kearns Goodwin	N/A
Late Show Presents: Meanwhile. John Lithgow discusses Art Happens Here. Doris Kearns Goodwin discusses her new book, An Unfinished Love Story.
1482	April 18, 2024	Sandra Oh, Reid Scott	N/A
Rescue Dog Rescue (special appearance by Daniel Radcliffe). Sandra Oh discusses The Sympathizer. Reid Scott discusses The Idea of You.
1483	April 29, 2024	Jean Smart, Gayle Rankin	N/A
The Late Show Presents: The Sound of Science. Jean Smart discusses Hacks. Gayle Rankin discusses Cabaret.
1484	April 30, 2024	Jeff Daniels, Hannah Einbinder	N/A
Béla Fleck sits in with the band and provides musical accompaniment. Late Show Presents: Meanwhile. Jeff Daniels discusses A Man in Full. Hannah Einbinder discusses Hacks.

=== May ===
No.	Original release date	Guest(s)	Musical/entertainment guest(s)
1485	May 1, 2024	Carol Burnett, Phil Keoghan	Jacob Collier
Carol Burnett takes "The Colbert Questionert" (new footage from March 26 episode). Phil Keoghan discusses The Amazing Race. Jacob Collier performs "Cinnamon Crush" from his album Djesse Vol. 4, featuring Lindsey Lomis.
1486	May 2, 2024	John Leguizamo, Laura Coates	N/A
Furious Cam! Late Show Presents: Meanwhile. John Leguizamo discusses The Green Veil. Laura Coates discusses recent politics.
1487	May 6, 2024	Ethan Hawke, Cedric the Entertainer	N/A
Cyborgasm. Ethan Hawke discusses Wildcat. Cedric the Entertainer discusses The Neighborhood.
1488	May 7, 2024	Tiffany Haddish, Meredith Scardino	N/A
Breaking Zoos. Late Show Presents: Meanwhile. Tiffany Haddish discusses her new book, I Curse You with Joy. Meredith Scardino discusses Girls5eva.
1489	May 8, 2024	Jen Psaki	Elyanna
Jen Psaki discusses recent politics and her new book, Say More. Elyanna performs a medley of "Callin’ U (Tamally Maak)" and "Mama Eh".
1490	May 9, 2024	Ryan Gosling, Desi Lydic	N/A
Late Show Presents: Meanwhile. Ryan Gosling takes "The Colbert Questionert" (new footage from February 11 episode). Desi Lydic discusses The Daily Show.
1491	May 13, 2024	Steve Carell	Paul Simon
Stephen and Steve Carell bring back Even Stevphen. Steve Carell discusses Uncle Vanya and IF. Paul Simon performs "Slip Slidin' Away" from his 1977 album Greatest Hits, Etc.
1492	May 14, 2024	Jennifer Hudson, Marisa Abela	N/A
Late Show Presents: Meanwhile. Sexy-genarian Cam. Jennifer Hudson discusses The Jennifer Hudson Show. Marisa Abela discusses Back to Black.
1493	May 15, 2024	George Stephanopoulos, Michelle Buteau	N/A
Young Stephen (special appearance by Iain Armitage). Damn! Cam. George Stephanopoulos discusses recent politics and his new book, The Situation Room. Michelle Buteau discusses Babes.
1494	May 16, 2024	David Letterman, Claudia Jessie	Norah Jones
Late Show Presents: Meanwhile. David Letterman takes "The Colbert Questionert" (new footage from November 20, 2023 episode). Claudia Jessie discusses Bridgerton. Norah Jones performs "Paradise" from her album Visions.
1495	May 20, 2024	Sarah Paulson, Paul Scheer	The cast of Merrily We Roll Along
The Late Show Presents: Court Sketch Court: To Sketch A Predator. Sarah Paulson discusses Appropriate. Paul Scheer discusses his new book, Joyful Recollections of Trauma. The cast of Merrily We Roll Along (Lindsay Mendez, Daniel Radcliffe and Jonathan Groff) performs "Old Friends".
1496	May 21, 2024	Billie Eilish	Billie Eilish
The new voice of ChatGPT (special appearance by J. B. Smoove). Lakecia Benjamin and Angie Swan sit in with the band and provide musical accompaniment. Late Show Presents: Meanwhile. Billie Eilish discusses her new album, Hit Me Hard and Soft. Billie Eilish performs "Lunch".
1497	May 22, 2024	Anya Taylor-Joy, Second gentleman Doug Emhoff	N/A
Lakecia Benjamin and Angie Swan sit in with the band and provide musical accompaniment. Anya Taylor-Joy discusses Furiosa: A Mad Max Saga. Second gentleman Doug Emhoff discusses recent politics.
1498	May 23, 2024	Chris Hemsworth, James Dyson	N/A
Lakecia Benjamin and Angie Swan sit in with the band and provide musical accompaniment. Late Show Presents: Meanwhile. Chris Hemsworth discusses Furiosa: A Mad Max Saga. James Dyson discusses the new Dyson Supersonic Nural hair dryer.

=== June ===
No.	Original release date	Guest(s)	Musical/entertainment guest(s)
1499	June 3, 2024	Alicia Keys, Stephen Merchant	N/A
A cameo appearance by Laura Benanti as Melania Trump. Alicia Keys discusses Hell's Kitchen. Stephen Merchant discusses The Outlaws.
1500	June 4, 2024	Viggo Mortensen, Olivia Cooke	The cast of Illinoise
Late Show Presents: Meanwhile. Viggo Mortensen discusses The Dead Don't Hurt. Olivia Cooke discusses House of the Dragon. The cast of Illinoise performs "Jacksonville".
1501	June 5, 2024	Jon Bon Jovi, Tig Notaro	N/A
What's Going On Over There? Jon Bon Jovi discusses Thank You, Goodnight and Bon Jovi's new album, Forever. Tig Notaro discusses her new stand-up special, Hello Again, and Am I OK?
1502	June 6, 2024	Julia Louis-Dreyfus	Hozier
Late Show Presents: Meanwhile. Julia Louis-Dreyfus discusses her podcast, Wiser Than Me, and Tuesday. Hozier performs "Too Sweet".
1503	June 10, 2024	Senator Cory Booker	Billie Eilish
The Late Show Presents: The Sound of Science. Senator Cory Booker discusses recent politics. Billie Eilish performs "The Greatest" from her album Hit Me Hard and Soft.
1504	June 11, 2024	Jake Gyllenhaal, Chloe Fineman	N/A
Fred Wesley sits in with the band and provides musical accompaniment. Late Show Presents: Meanwhile. Jake Gyllenhaal discusses Presumed Innocent. Chloe Fineman discusses Megalopolis and Despicable Me 4.
1505	June 12, 2024	Seth Meyers	Omar Apollo
Stephen Colbert Is Like a Teacher, But Paid So Much More! It Really Makes You Question the Order of Society and What We Place Value On! (special appearances by Jeff Daniels and Tim Meadows). Seth Meyers discusses Strike Force Five and Late Night. Omar Apollo performs "Dispose of Me" from his album God Said No.
1506	June 13, 2024	Jude Law	Nathaniel Rateliff & The Night Sweats
First Drafts: Father's Day Cards, with Stephen's wife, Evie. Jude Law discusses Firebrand. Nathaniel Rateliff & The Night Sweats perform "Heartless" from their album South of Here.
1507	June 17, 2024	Dr. Anthony Fauci, Callum Turner	N/A
Trombone Shorty sits in with the band and provides musical accompaniment. Stephen's audience with Pope Francis. Dr. Anthony Fauci discusses his new book, On Call. Callum Turner discusses Masters of the Air.
1508	June 18, 2024	Jon Favreau, Jon Lovett and Tommy Vietor	Lake Street Dive
Cyborgasm. Jon Favreau, Jon Lovett and Tommy Vietor discuss recent politics. Lake Street Dive performs "Dance with a Stranger" from their album Good Together, with the Late Show Band providing musical accompaniment.
1509	June 19, 2024	Cynthia Erivo, Representative Jamaal Bowman	N/A
The Late Show (special appearances by Ron Howard, Clint Howard, Neil deGrasse Tyson and Paul Bettany). Cynthia Erivo discusses A Little Night Music and Wicked. Representative Jamaal Bowman discusses recent politics.
1510	June 20, 2024	Jeremy Allen White, Ava DuVernay	N/A
Late Show Presents: Meanwhile. Jeremy Allen White discusses The Bear. Ava DuVernay discusses Origin.

=== July ===
No.	Original release date	Guest(s)	Musical/entertainment guest(s)
1511	July 8, 2024	Michael Douglas, Abby Phillip	N/A
"Rescue Dog Rescue" (special appearances by Antony Starr, Chace Crawford and Colby Minifie). Michael Douglas discusses America's Burning. Abby Phillip discusses recent politics.
1512	July 9, 2024	Serena Williams, Andrew McCarthy	N/A
Schuyler Col-facts. Late Show Presents: Meanwhile. Serena Williams discusses In the Arena. Andrew McCarthy discusses Brats.
1513	July 10, 2024	Governor Gretchen Whitmer, Martha Stewart	N/A
The Viper Groin Alert System. Governor Gretchen Whitmer discusses recent politics and her new book, True Gretch. Martha Stewart steps into the kitchen with Stephen.
1514	July 11, 2024	John Dickerson	Jessica Pratt
Late Show Presents: Meanwhile. John Dickerson discusses recent politics. Jessica Pratt performs "Life Is" from her album Here in the Pitch.
1515	July 15, 2024	Representative Adam Kinzinger	Bikini Kill
Special live episode following the first night of the 2024 Republican National Convention. Stephen acknowledges the attempted assassination of Donald Trump. Schuyler Col-facts. Representative Adam Kinzinger discusses recent politics. Bikini Kill performs "Rebel Girl".
1516	July 16, 2024	Senator Elizabeth Warren	Loudon Wainwright III
Special live episode following the second night of the 2024 Republican National Convention. Late Show Presents: Meanwhile. Senator Elizabeth Warren discusses recent politics. Loudon Wainwright III performs "A Father and a Son" from his 1992 album History.
1517	July 17, 2024	Glen Powell, Charlamagne tha God	N/A
Special live episode following the third night of the 2024 Republican National Convention. Schuyler Col-facts. The Late Show Presents: The Sound of Science. Glen Powell discusses Twisters. Charlamagne tha God discusses recent politics and his new book, Get Honest or Die Lying.
1518	July 18, 2024	Senator Bernie Sanders	OneRepublic
Special live episode following the fourth and final night of the 2024 Republican National Convention. Late Show Presents: Meanwhile. Senator Bernie Sanders discusses recent politics. OneRepublic performs "Sink or Swim" from their album Artificial Paradise.
1519	July 22, 2024	Keanu Reeves	Charles Wesley Godwin
Big Questions with Even Bigger Stars (with Keanu Reeves). Keanu Reeves discusses his new book, The Book of Elsewhere. Charles Wesley Godwin performs "Family Ties" from his album of the same name.
1520	July 23, 2024	Matthew Macfadyen, Jon M. Chu	N/A
Stephen Colbert's Disney's Pixar's Frozen 3 Starring Cocomelon (special appearance by Senator Elizabeth Warren). Matthew Macfadyen discusses Deadpool & Wolverine. Jon M. Chu discusses his new book, Viewfinder.
1521	July 24, 2024	Melinda French Gates, Saoirse-Monica Jackson	N/A
Late Show Presents: Meanwhile. Melinda French Gates discusses Moments That Make Us and recent politics. Saoirse-Monica Jackson discusses Derry Girls and The Decameron.
1522	July 25, 2024	Kevin Hart	Erica Rhodes
Andrew Bird sits in with the band and provides musical accompaniment. Cyborgasm. Kevin Hart discusses Borderlands. Erica Rhodes gives a stand-up performance.

=== August ===
No.	Original release date	Guest(s)	Musical/entertainment guest(s)
1523	August 12, 2024	Kaitlan Collins, Walton Goggins	N/A
Kaitlan Collins discusses recent politics. Walton Goggins discusses Fallout.
1524	August 13, 2024	Bowen Yang, Nick Cave	N/A
Bowen Yang discusses the upcoming 50th season of Saturday Night Live. Nick Cave discusses his new album, Wild God, and his newsletter, Red Hand Files.
1525	August 14, 2024	Alex Wagner	Ali Macofsky
Late Show Presents: Meanwhile. Alex Wagner discusses recent politics. Ali Macofsky gives a stand-up performance.
1526	August 15, 2024	Sean Hayes, Billie Eilish, Hiroyuki Sanada	Koe Wetzel with Jessie Murph
Community Calendar: Chicago, Illinois with Sean Hayes. Billie Eilish takes "The Colbert Questionert" (new footage from May 21 episode). Hiroyuki Sanada discusses Shōgun. Koe Wetzel performs "High Road" from his album 9 Lives, with Jessie Murph providing musical accompaniment.
1527	August 19, 2024	Hillary Rodham Clinton, Julia Louis-Dreyfus	N/A
Special live episode following the first night of the 2024 Democratic National Convention. The Chicago National Anthem (special appearances by Jennifer Hudson, Sean Hayes, Jason Sudeikis, Nick Offerman, Robert Smigel and George Wendt). Late Show Presents: Meanwhile. Hillary Rodham Clinton discusses recent politics and her new book, Something Lost, Something Gained. Julia Louis-Dreyfus discusses her participation in the Democratic National Convention.
1528	August 20, 2024	Speaker Emerita Nancy Pelosi, House Democratic Leader Hakeem Jeffries	N/A
Special live episode following the second night of the 2024 Democratic National Convention. A cameo appearance by Laura Benanti as Melania Trump. Speaker Emerita Nancy Pelosi discusses recent politics and her new book, The Art of Power. House Democratic Leader Hakeem Jeffries discusses recent politics.
1529	August 21, 2024	Pete Buttigieg	Chance the Rapper
Special live episode following the third night of the 2024 Democratic National Convention. Donny Franks visits the Democratic National Convention (special appearances by Alexandria Ocasio-Cortez, Jaime Harrison, James Carville and JB Pritzker). Pete Buttigieg discusses recent politics. Chance the Rapper performs "Together" from his upcoming album Star Line.
1530	August 22, 2024	Representative Alexandria Ocasio-Cortez	Mavis Staples and Jeff Tweedy
Special live episode following the fourth and final night of the 2024 Democratic National Convention. Stephen visits Wrigley Field (special appearances by Jameson Taillon, Nico Hoerner, Ian Happ, Walton Goggins and Jennifer Hudson). Representative Alexandria Ocasio-Cortez discusses recent politics. Mavis Staples and Jeff Tweedy perform "Freedom Highway".

=== September ===
No.	Original release date	Guest(s)	Musical/entertainment guest(s)
1531	September 3, 2024	Supreme Court Justice Ketanji Brown Jackson	Kaytranada featuring Ravyn Lenae & Channel Tres
The Late Show Presents: The Sound of Science. Supreme Court Justice Ketanji Brown Jackson discusses recent politics and her new book, Lovely One. Kaytranada performs a medley of "Video" and "Drip Sweat" from his album Timeless, featuring Ravyn Lenae and Channel Tres.
1532	September 4, 2024	Curtis "50 Cent" Jackson, Jack Lowden	N/A
Late Show Presents: Meanwhile. Curtis "50 Cent" Jackson discusses his new book, The Accomplice. Jack Lowden discusses Slow Horses.
1533	September 5, 2024	Stephen Curry, Senator Mark Kelly	N/A
Stephen Curry discusses the gold medal won at the Summer Olympics and the Underrated Golf Tour. Senator Mark Kelly discusses recent politics and his new book, Mousetronaut Saves the World.
1534	September 9, 2024	Jim Parsons, Natasha Rothwell	N/A
Jim Parsons discusses Our Town. Natasha Rothwell discusses The White Lotus and How to Die Alone.
1535	September 10, 2024	John Dickerson	Tems
Special live episode following the second presidential debate. Late Show Presents: Meanwhile. John Dickerson discusses the second presidential debate. Tems performs "Burning" from her album Born in the Wild.
1536	September 11, 2024	Samuel L. Jackson, Amy Ryan	N/A
Taylor Swift Decoder Cam. Cyborgasm. Should This Be Happening? I Guess This Is Happening Now. Samuel L. Jackson discusses Fight Night: The Million Dollar Heist. Amy Ryan discusses Wolfs.
1537	September 12, 2024	Jeff Bridges	N/A
Stephen steps into the kitchen with his wife, Evie; they discuss their new book, Does This Taste Funny? Jeff Bridges discusses The Old Man.
1538	September 17, 2024	Jeremy Strong, Dr. Francis Collins	N/A
Huntertones sit in with the band and provide musical accompaniment. Late Show Presents: Meanwhile. Jeremy Strong discusses The Apprentice. Dr. Francis Collins discusses his new book, The Road to Wisdom.
1539	September 18, 2024	Rachel Maddow	Shaboozey
Parent Cam. The Late Show Presents: The Sound of Science. Rachel Maddow discusses recent politics and From Russia with Lev. Shaboozey performs "Highway" from his album Where I've Been, Isn't Where I'm Going.
1540	September 19, 2024	Anderson Cooper	Sting
Late Show Presents: Meanwhile. Anderson Cooper discusses recent politics and his podcast, All There Is. Sting performs "I Wrote Your Name (Upon My Heart)".
1541	September 23, 2024	Canadian Prime Minister Justin Trudeau, RuPaul	N/A
Canadian Prime Minister Justin Trudeau discusses recent politics and Canada's participation in the United Nations General Assembly. RuPaul takes "The Colbert Questionert" (new footage from March 4 episode).
1542	September 24, 2024	Kate Winslet, Jude Law	N/A
Late Show Presents: Meanwhile. Kate Winslet discusses Lee. Jude Law takes "The Colbert Questionert" (new footage from June 13 episode).
1543	September 25, 2024	Bill Gates, Jane Goodall	N/A
A special appearance by Andy Cohen. Bill Gates discusses his work for the Bill & Melinda Gates Foundation and What's Next? The Future with Bill Gates. Jane Goodall discusses Vote For Nature.
1544	September 26, 2024	Sarah Silverman, Chris Stapleton	Chris Stapleton
Late Show Presents: Meanwhile. Sarah Silverman discusses her stand-up tour, Postmortem. Chris Stapleton discusses his album, Higher. Chris Stapleton performs "What Am I Gonna Do".
1545	September 30, 2024	Don Cheadle, Malcolm Gladwell	N/A
Members of Lettuce sit in with the band and provide musical accompaniment. Stephen acknowledges the impact of Hurricane Helene. Don Cheadle discusses Fight Night: The Million Dollar Heist. Malcolm Gladwell discusses his new book, Revenge of the Tipping Point.

=== October ===
No.	Original release date	Guest(s)	Musical/entertainment guest(s)
1546	October 1, 2024	Chris Hayes	Brittany Howard
Special live episode following the vice presidential debate. Late Show Presents: Meanwhile. Meanwhile Presents: Mientras Tanto. Chris Hayes discusses the vice presidential debate and recent politics. Brittany Howard performs "What Now" from her album of the same name.
1547	October 2, 2024	Andrew Garfield, Ina Garten	N/A
The Late Show Presents: The Sound of Science. Andrew Garfield discusses We Live in Time. Ina Garten discusses her new book, Be Ready When the Luck Happens.
1548	October 3, 2024	Chris Wallace, Yotam Ottolenghi	N/A
A special appearance by Justin Hartley. Chris Wallace discusses recent politics and his new book, Countdown 1960. Yotam Ottolenghi steps into the kitchen with Stephen and discusses his new book, Comfort.
1549	October 8, 2024	Vice President Kamala Harris	N/A
Stephen acknowledges the impact of Hurricane Milton. Vice President Kamala Harris discusses recent politics and her presidential campaign.
1550	October 14, 2024	Kathy Bates, Pamela Anderson	N/A
Grace Bowers sits in with the band and provides musical accompaniment. Late Show Presents: Meanwhile. Kathy Bates discusses Matlock. Pamela Anderson discusses her new book, I Love You: Recipes from the Heart.
1551	October 15, 2024	Jason Segel, Representative Jasmine Crockett	N/A
What's Going On Over There? Jason Segel discusses Shrinking. Representative Jasmine Crockett discusses recent politics.
1552	October 16, 2024	Stanley Tucci, Harvey Guillén	N/A
Late Show Presents: Meanwhile. Stanley Tucci discusses his new book, What I Ate in One Year (And Related Thoughts). Harvey Guillén discusses What We Do in the Shadows.
1553	October 17, 2024	Bob Woodward	Wyatt Flores
Stephen Colbert Presents: That's Yeet: Dabbing on Fleek, Fam! Bob Woodward discusses recent politics and his new book, War. Wyatt Flores performs "Oh Susannah" from his album Welcome to the Plains.
1554	October 21, 2024	Brian Cox, Yulia Navalnaya	N/A
Consumer Watch. Brian Cox discusses The Lord of the Rings: The War of the Rohirrim. Yulia Navalnaya discusses her late husband Alexei Navalny's book, Patriot.
1555	October 22, 2024	Senator John Fetterman, Alfonso Cuarón	N/A
Late Show Presents: Meanwhile. Senator John Fetterman discusses recent politics. Alfonso Cuarón discusses Disclaimer.
1556	October 23, 2024	Anna Kendrick, Matty Matheson	N/A
Stephen+ (special appearance by Samuel L. Jackson). Anna Kendrick discusses Woman of the Hour. Matty Matheson discusses The Bear and his new book, Soups, Salads, Sandwiches.
1557	October 24, 2024	Julia Louis-Dreyfus, Jonathan Alter	Jhayco
Late Show Presents: Meanwhile. Julia Louis-Dreyfus takes "The Colbert Questionert" (new footage from June 6 episode). Jonathan Alter discusses recent politics and his new book, American Reckoning. Jhayco performs a medley of "Vida Rockstar" and "Passoa" from his album Le Clique: Vida Rockstar (X).
1558	October 28, 2024	Robin Wright, Nicole Scherzinger	N/A
Late Show Presents: Meanwhile. Robin Wright discusses Here. Nicole Scherzinger discusses Sunset Boulevard.
1559	October 29, 2024	Tom Hanks	Rachel Zegler, Jack Antonoff and the cast of Romeo and Juliet
The Late Show Too Much Exposition Theater, with Tom Hanks. Tom Hanks discusses Here. Rachel Zegler, Jack Antonoff and the cast of Romeo and Juliet perform "Man of the House".
1560	October 30, 2024	Kieran Culkin, Ta-Nehisi Coates	N/A
Late Show Presents: Screamwhile. Kieran Culkin discusses A Real Pain. Ta-Nehisi Coates discusses recent politics and his new book, The Message.
1561	October 31, 2024	Seth Meyers	Mohanad Elshieky
The Late Show Presents: The Sound of Science. The Sound of Science Presents: Stop It. Stop It Right Now. Seth Meyers discusses his new stand-up special, Dad Man Walking. Mohanad Elshieky gives a stand-up performance.

=== November ===
No.	Original release date	Guest(s)	Musical/entertainment guest(s)
1562	November 4, 2024	Governor Tim Walz, John Oliver	N/A
A response from Iowa (special appearance by Michael Shannon). Governor Tim Walz discusses recent politics and the 2024 presidential election. John Oliver discusses recent politics.
1563	November 6, 2024	John Dickerson	Lenny Kravitz
Stephen acknowledges the results of the 2024 presidential election. Late Show Presents: Meanwhile. John Dickerson discusses recent politics. Lenny Kravitz performs "Paralyzed" from his album Blue Electric Light.
1564	November 7, 2024	Paul Bettany, Mike Birbiglia	N/A
The Late Show (special appearances by Robert Zemeckis and Tom Hanks). Paul Bettany discusses Here. Mike Birbiglia discusses his new stand-up special, The Good Life.
1565	November 11, 2024	Javier Bardem, Curtis "50 Cent" Jackson	N/A
Ooh Ooh! Ah! Ah! Update! Rescue Dog Rescue (special appearance by Chris Evans). Javier Bardem discusses Monsters: The Lyle and Erik Menendez Story. Curtis "50 Cent" Jackson takes "The Colbert Questionert" (new footage from September 4 episode).
1566	November 12, 2024	John Krasinski, Francis Ford Coppola	N/A
Stephen reveals John Krasinski as People's "Sexiest Man Alive" 2024 (special appearance by Chris Evans). Francis Ford Coppola discusses Megalopolis.
1567	November 13, 2024	Zoe Saldaña, Ken Burns	N/A
Late Show Presents: Meanwhile. Zoe Saldaña discusses Emilia Pérez. Ken Burns discusses Leonardo da Vinci.
1568	November 14, 2024	Billy Bob Thornton, Sharon Horgan	N/A
What's Going On Over There? Billy Bob Thornton discusses Landman. Sharon Horgan discusses Bad Sisters.
1569	November 18, 2024	Josh Brolin, Kacey Musgraves	N/A
Ooh Ooh! Ah! Ah! Update! Ooh Ooh! Emu Update! Late Show Presents: Meanwhile. Josh Brolin discusses his new book, From Under the Truck. Kacey Musgraves discusses her album, Deeper Well.
1570	November 19, 2024	President Bill Clinton	Kacey Musgraves
The Late Show Presents: The Sound of Science. President Bill Clinton discusses recent politics and his new book, Citizen. Kacey Musgraves performs "Arm's Length" from the expanded edition of her album Deeper Well.
1571	November 20, 2024	Paul Mescal, Elvis Costello & T Bone Burnett	The Coward Brothers
Ooh Ooh! Ah! Ah! Update! Late Show Presents: Meanwhile. Paul Mescal discusses Gladiator II. Elvis Costello & T Bone Burnett discuss Costello's new boxset, King of America & Other Realms, and their work together as "The Coward Brothers". The Coward Brothers perform "Always".
1572	November 21, 2024	House Democratic Leader Hakeem Jeffries, Jeffrey Wright	N/A
Tank and the Bangas' Tarriona Ball sits in with the band and provides musical accompaniment. First Drafts: Thanksgiving Cards, with Stephen's wife, Evie. House Democratic Leader Hakeem Jeffries discusses recent politics. Jeffrey Wright discusses The Agency.

=== December ===
No.	Original release date	Guest(s)	Musical/entertainment guest(s)
1573	December 2, 2024	Daniel Craig, Auliʻi Cravalho	N/A
Stephen Colbert Rest in Peace (special appearance by Amy Sedaris). Daniel Craig discusses Queer. Auliʻi Cravalho discusses Moana 2.
1574	December 3, 2024	Selena Gomez, Seth Meyers	N/A
Late Show Presents: Meanwhile. Selena Gomez discusses Emilia Pérez. Seth Meyers takes "The Colbert Questionert" (new footage from October 31 episode).
1575	December 4, 2024	Anderson Cooper & Andy Cohen	Doechii
The Late Show Presents: The Sound of Science. Anderson Cooper and Andy Cohen discuss their upcoming coverage of CNN's New Year's Eve Live show. Doechii performs a medley of "Denial Is a River" and "Boiled Peanuts" from her album Alligator Bites Never Heal.
1576	December 5, 2024	Kate McKinnon, Peter Sarsgaard	N/A
Ooh Ooh! Ah! Ah! Update! Monkey Mysteries. Ben Folds sits in with the band and provides musical accompaniment. Late Show Presents: Meanwhile. Kate McKinnon discusses her new book, The Millicent Quibb School of Etiquette for Young Ladies of Mad Science. Peter Sarsgaard discusses September 5.
1577	December 9, 2024	Billy Crystal	Arooj Aftab
FBI: Late Show. Late Show Presents: Meanwhile. Billy Crystal discusses Before. Arooj Aftab performs "Raat Ki Rani" from her album Night Reign.
1578	December 10, 2024	Mindy Kaling	Saul Trujillo
What's Going On Over There? Mindy Kaling discusses The Sex Lives of College Girls. Saul Trujillo gives a stand-up performance.
1579	December 11, 2024	Dua Lipa, Jon Batiste	N/A
Rescue Dog Rescue with Dua Lipa. Dua Lipa discusses An Evening with Dua Lipa. Jon Batiste discusses his new album, Beethoven Blues, and Saturday Night.
1580	December 12, 2024	Timothée Chalamet, Sabrina Carpenter	N/A
Unseen Mysteries of the Hidden Secrets. Late Show Presents: Meanwhile. Timothée Chalamet discusses A Complete Unknown. Sabrina Carpenter discusses A Nonsense Christmas with Sabrina Carpenter.
1581	December 16, 2024	Nicole Kidman, Bill Skarsgård	N/A
Unseen Mysteries of the Hidden Secrets. First Drafts: Holiday Cards, with Stephen's wife, Evie. Nicole Kidman discusses Babygirl. Bill Skarsgård discusses Nosferatu.
1582	December 17, 2024	Elton John & Brandi Carlile	N/A
Elton John and Brandi Carlile discuss Never Too Late.
1583	December 18, 2024	Adrien Brody, Ben Schwartz	N/A
Unseen Mysteries of the Hidden Secrets. Adrien Brody discusses The Brutalist. Ben Schwartz discusses Sonic the Hedgehog 3.
1584	December 19, 2024	Edward Norton	Louis Cato and The Late Show Band
The Late Show Presents: "It's a Worm-derful Life". Edward Norton discusses A Complete Unknown. Louis Cato and The Late Show Band perform "This Time of Year".
