= List of The Late Show with Stephen Colbert episodes (2023) =

- No. of episodes: 86

Release
- Original network: CBS
- Original release: January 3 – December 21, 2023

Season chronology
- ← Previous; 2022 episodes Next → 2024 episodes

This is the list of episodes of The Late Show with Stephen Colbert that aired in 2023.

Production was ceased from May 2 to October 2 due to the 2023 Writers Guild of America strike amid the 2023 Hollywood labor disputes.

== 2023 ==
=== January ===
| No. | Original release date | Guest(s) | Musical/entertainment guest(s) |
|---|---|---|---|
| 1348 | January 3, 2023 | Michelle Obama, Quinta Brunson, Tom Papa | N/A |
Michelle Obama takes "The Colbert Questionert" (new footage from November 14, 2022 episode). Quinta Brunson discusses Abbott Elementary. Tom Papa discusses his new comedy special, What a Day!
| 1349 | January 4, 2023 | Shania Twain, Ayo Edebiri | N/A |
Space News: Mars Lander News. Space News: Life on Venus News. Space News: Australian Space News. Space News: Space Hotel News. Shania Twain discusses her upcoming album, Queen of Me. Ayo Edebiri discusses The Bear. Stephen acknowledges the death of Frank Galati.
| 1350 | January 5, 2023 | Chris Wallace, Jessie Buckley | N/A |
Late Show Presents: Meanwhile. Chris Wallace discusses recent politics and the upcoming 75th anniversary of Meet the Press. Jessie Buckley discusses Women Talking.
| 1351 | January 9, 2023 | Tom Hanks | Rachael & Vilray |
Late Show Presents: Meanwhile. Tom Hanks discusses A Man Called Otto. Rachael & Vilray perform "Is a Good Man Real?" from their album I Love a Love Song!, with Huntertones and the Late Show Band providing musical accompaniment.
| 1352 | January 10, 2023 | Prince Harry, Duke of Sussex | N/A |
Prince Harry discusses his new book, Spare.
| 1353 | January 11, 2023 | Janelle Monáe, Jamie Oliver | N/A |
Late: An M. Night Shyamalan Production (special appearances by M. Night Shyamalan and Samuel L. Jackson). Janelle Monáe discusses Glass Onion: A Knives Out Mystery. Jamie Oliver steps into the kitchen with Stephen and discusses his new book, One: Simple One-Pan Wonders.
| 1354 | January 12, 2023 | Danai Gurira, Jeremy Pope | Ingrid Andress |
Late Show Presents: Meanwhile. Danai Gurira discusses Black Panther: Wakanda Forever. Jeremy Pope discusses The Inspection and The Collaboration. Ingrid Andress performs "Feel Like This" from her album Good Person.
| 1355 | January 16, 2023 | Hugh Jackman | Mimi Webb |
Cory Wong sits in with the band and provides musical accompaniment. Cyborgasm. Hugh Jackman discusses The Music Man, Deadpool & Wolverine and The Son. Mimi Webb performs "Red Flags" from her upcoming album Amelia.
| 1356 | January 17, 2023 | Jesse Eisenberg, Atsuko Okatsuka | N/A |
Cory Wong sits in with the band and provides musical accompaniment. Late Show Presents: Meanwhile. Jesse Eisenberg discusses When You Finish Saving the World. Atsuko Okatsuka discusses her new comedy special, The Intruder.
| 1357 | January 18, 2023 | Trevor Noah, Stephanie Hsu | N/A |
Marley & GoFundMe. Cory Wong sits in with the band and provides musical accompaniment. Trevor Noah discusses his departure from The Daily Show and Black Panther: Wakanda Forever. Stephanie Hsu discusses Everything Everywhere All at Once.
| 1358 | January 19, 2023 | Representative Adam Kinzinger | Meet Me @ the Altar |
Cory Wong sits in with the band and provides musical accompaniment. A visit from George Santos (special appearance by Harvey Guillén). Representative Adam Kinzinger discusses recent politics. Meet Me @ the Altar perform "Say It (To My Face)" from their upcoming album Past // Present // Future.
| 1359 | January 23, 2023 | Nathan Lane, Sam Jay | N/A |
What's Up: Docs! Romansplaining with Stephen Colbert. Nathan Lane discusses Pictures From Home. Sam Jay discusses You People.
| 1360 | January 24, 2023 | Jason Segel, Chuck D | N/A |
What's Up: Docs! Mike Pence Edition. Jason Segel discusses Shrinking. Chuck D discusses Fight the Power and his new book, Livin' Loud.
| 1361 | January 25, 2023 | Brett Goldstein, Amanda Warren | N/A |
What's Up: Docs! Mike Pence Edition. Stephen Colbert Is Short and Punchy (special appearance by Tom Hanks). Brett Goldstein discusses Thor: Love and Thunder, Shrinking and Ted Lasso. Amanda Warren discusses East New York.
| 1362 | January 26, 2023 | Tom Hanks, Audie Cornish | Elle King |
Late Show Presents: Meanwhile. The Late Show Presents: Maybe Coming Soon, with Tom Hanks (new footage from January 9 episode). Audie Cornish discusses recent politics. Elle King performs "Love Go By" from her album Come Get Your Wife.
| 1363 | January 30, 2023 | Rachel Brosnahan, Murray Bartlett | N/A |
The Wørd: Stephen discusses the killing of Tyre Nichols. Rachel Brosnahan discusses The Sign in Sidney Brustein's Window. Murray Bartlett discusses The White Lotus and The Last of Us.
| 1364 | January 31, 2023 | Jessica Chastain, Jay Shetty | N/A |
Stephen Colbert's Monkey Mysteries. Late Show Presents: Meanwhile. Jessica Chastain discusses A Doll's House. Jay Shetty discusses his new book, 8 Rules of Love.

=== February ===
| No. | Original release date | Guest(s) | Musical/entertainment guest(s) |
|---|---|---|---|
| 1365 | February 1, 2023 | Harrison Ford | Vic Mensa |
Stephen Colbert's interview of One America News Network's interview of George Santos. Stephen Colbert's Monkey Mysteries. Cyborgasm. Harrison Ford discusses 1923, Shrinking and Captain America: Brave New World. Vic Mensa performs "Strawberry Louis Vuitton", featuring MAETA & Phony Ppl.
| 1366 | February 2, 2023 | Connie Britton, Daniel Ricciardo | N/A |
First Drafts: Valentine's Day Cards, with Stephen's wife, Evie. Connie Britton discusses Dear Edward. Daniel Ricciardo discusses Formula 1: Drive to Survive.
| 1367 | February 13, 2023 | John Oliver, Ron Klain | N/A |
John Oliver discusses Last Week Tonight. Ron Klain discusses the discusses why continued use of his private jet has no bearing on climate change.
| 1368 | February 14, 2023 | Patrick Stewart, Ke Huy Quan | N/A |
Meshell Ndegeocello sits in with the band and provides musical accompaniment. "I'll Make Love to You (But We Don't Have To)" (special appearance by Boyz II Men). Patrick Stewart discusses Star Trek: Picard. Ke Huy Quan discusses Everything Everywhere All at Once.
| 1369 | February 15, 2023 | Jim Gaffigan, Jesse Williams | Raye featuring 070 Shake |
Late Show Presents: Meanwhile. Jim Gaffigan discusses Linoleum. Jesse Williams discusses Only Murders in the Building and Your Place or Mine. RAYE performs "Escapism" from her album My 21st Century Blues, featuring 070 Shake and with The Late Show Band providing musical accompaniment.
| 1370 | February 16, 2023 | Reverend Al Sharpton, Jessica Williams | N/A |
A visit from George Santos (special appearance by Harvey Guillén). Al Sharpton discusses Loudmouth and Tawana Brawley. Jessica Williams discusses Shrinking.
| 1371 | February 20, 2023 | Senator Bernie Sanders | Little Simz |
Stephen Colbert Presents: That's Yeet: Dabbing on Fleek, Fam! That's Yeet: Dabbing on Fleek, Fam! Presents: That's Crunk: Chillaxin' Fo Shazzle, Dawg! Wazzzaaappppp! Senator Bernie Sanders discusses recent politics and his new book, It's OK to Be Angry About Capitalism. Little Simz performs "Heart on Fire" from her album No Thank You, with the Harlem Gospel Choir, B String Quartet and the Late Show Band providing musical accompaniment.
| 1372 | February 21, 2023 | P!nk, Jonathan Majors | P!nk |
Late Show Presents: Meanwhile. Meanwhile Presents: Peenwhile. P!nk discusses her new album, Trustfall. Jonathan Majors discusses Ant-Man and the Wasp: Quantumania and Creed III. P!nk performs "When I Get There".
| 1373 | February 22, 2023 | Eugene Levy, Nas | N/A |
Late Show Presents: Meanwhile. Eugene Levy discusses The Reluctant Traveler. Nas discusses his new album, King's Disease III.
| 1374 | February 23, 2023 | Hank Azaria, Isabel Wilkerson | Depeche Mode |
The Sound of Science. Hank Azaria discusses Hello Tomorrow! Isabel Wilkerson discusses her new book, Caste: The Origins of Our Discontents. Depeche Mode performs "Ghosts Again" from their upcoming album Memento Mori.
| 1375 | February 27, 2023 | Damian Lewis, U.N. Ambassador Linda Thomas-Greenfield | N/A |
Late Show Presents: Meanwhile. Meanwhile Presents: Sovereenwhile. Damian Lewis discusses A Spy Among Friends and Billions. Linda Thomas-Greenfield discusses recent politics.
| 1376 | February 28, 2023 | Prince Harry, Duke of Sussex, Kal Penn | Big Thief |
The Late Show's Oops! All A-Holes. Romansplaining with Stephen Colbert. Prince Harry takes "The Colbert Questionert" (new footage from January 10 episode). Kal Penn discusses Getting Warmer. Big Thief performs "Vampire Empire".

=== March ===
| No. | Original release date | Guest(s) | Musical/entertainment guest(s) |
|---|---|---|---|
| 1377 | March 1, 2023 | Michelle Yeoh, Riley Keough | N/A |
Late Show Presents: Meanwhile. Michelle Yeoh discusses Everything Everywhere All at Once and Wicked. Riley Keough discusses Daisy Jones & the Six and War Pony.
| 1378 | March 2, 2023 | Steven Spielberg & John Williams | N/A |
All The President's Menu. Steven Spielberg & John Williams discuss The Fabelmans and their careers in film.
| 1379 | March 6, 2023 | Nick Kroll, Representative Jim Himes | N/A |
A new opening credits (special appearances by Daniel Kwan and Daniel Scheinert). Highway to Health. Nick Kroll discusses History of the World, Part II. Representative Jim Himes discusses recent politics.
| 1380 | March 7, 2023 | James Taylor, Eva Longoria | James Taylor |
Tucker Carlson Presents: Jaws. Late Show Presents: Meanwhile. James Taylor discusses his upcoming residency in Las Vegas. Eva Longoria discusses Searching for Mexico. James Taylor performs "Mona" from his 1985 album That's Why I'm Here.
| 1381 | March 8, 2023 | Idris Elba, F. Murray Abraham | N/A |
Idris Elba discusses Three Thousand Years of Longing and Luther: The Fallen Sun. F. Murray Abraham discusses The White Lotus and The Magic Flute.
| 1382 | March 9, 2023 | Lily Tomlin & Jane Fonda; Steven Spielberg & John Williams | N/A |
The Treasons. Lily Tomlin & Jane Fonda discuss Moving On. Steven Spielberg & John Williams discuss their careers in film (new footage from March 2 episode).
| 1383 | March 13, 2023 | Christina Ricci, Jen Psaki | Robert Glasper featuring Yebba |
Late Show Presents: Meanwhile. Christina Ricci discusses Yellowjackets. Jen Psaki discusses Inside and recent politics. Robert Glasper performs "Over" from his album Black Radio III, featuring Yebba.
| 1384 | March 14, 2023 | Regé-Jean Page, Skylar Astin | John Mayer |
A St. Patrick's Day Message (special appearance by Liam Neeson). Regé-Jean Page discusses Bridgerton and Dungeons & Dragons: Honor Among Thieves. Skylar Astin discusses So Help Me Todd. John Mayer performs "Waitin' On the Day" from his 2013 album Paradise Valley.
| 1385 | March 15, 2023 | Vice President Kamala Harris, Carrie Coon | N/A |
Computer & Phone: Chatbots At Law. Vice President Kamala Harris discusses recent politics. Carrie Coon discusses Boston Strangler.
| 1386 | March 27, 2023 | Hugh Grant, Sean Hayes | N/A |
Space News: SpaceX News. Space News: Space Cleaning News. Space News: Space President News. Space News: Mars Flooding News. Space News: Planetary Conjunction News. Hugh Grant discusses Dungeons & Dragons: Honor Among Thieves. Sean Hayes discusses Good Night, Oscar and his new book, Time Out.
| 1387 | March 28, 2023 | Mary J. Blige, Alison Roman | N/A |
Stephen Colbert's interview of Sean Hannity's interview of Donald Trump. Stephen acknowledges the mass shooting in Nashville, Tennessee. Late Show Presents: Meanwhile. Meanwhile Presents: Meatwhile. Mary J. Blige discusses her new book, Mary Can, and the upcoming 50th anniversary of hip hop music. Alison Roman steps into the kitchen with Stephen and discusses her new book, Sweet Enough.
| 1388 | March 29, 2023 | Taron Egerton, Jay Chandrasekhar | N/A |
Breaking News. First Drafts: Easter Cards, with Stephen's wife, Evie. Taron Egerton discusses Tetris. Jay Chandrasekhar discusses Quasi.
| 1389 | March 30, 2023 | Brooke Shields, Clint Smith | Weyes Blood |
Stephen acknowledges the indictment of Donald Trump. Late Show Presents: Meanwhile. Brooke Shields discusses Pretty Baby. Clint Smith discusses his new book, Above Ground. Weyes Blood performs "God Turn Me Into a Flower" from her album And in the Darkness, Hearts Aglow.

=== April ===
| No. | Original release date | Guest(s) | Musical/entertainment guest(s) |
|---|---|---|---|
| 1390 | April 3, 2023 | Stephen A. Smith, Dylan McDermott | Davido |
The cast of Ted Lasso gives Stephen a pep talk (special appearances by Jason Sudeikis, Hannah Waddingham, Toheeb Jimoh, Phil Dunster, Cristo Fernández, Brendan Hunt and Kola Bokinni). Late Show Presents: Meanwhile. Stephen A. Smith discusses his new book, Straight Shooter. Dylan McDermott discusses FBI: Most Wanted. Davido performs a medley of "Feel" and "Unavailable" from his album Timeless.
| 1391 | April 4, 2023 | Lin-Manuel Miranda & John Kander | The cast of New York, New York |
Cyborgasm. Lin-Manuel Miranda & John Kander discuss New York, New York. The cast of New York, New York performs "But the World Goes 'Round".
| 1392 | April 5, 2023 | The Crew of NASA's Artemis II; Jodie Comer | N/A |
The Trump Indictment Commemorative Coin. Sonny the Easter Bunny in "The MAGA-Hole of Madness". The crew of NASA's Artemis II (Christina Koch, Reid Wiseman, Victor Glover and Jeremy Hansen) discuss next year's trip to the Moon. Jodie Comer discusses Prima Facie.
| 1393 | April 10, 2023 | Brian Cox, Keri Russell | N/A |
Late Show Presents: Meanwhile. Brian Cox discusses Succession. Keri Russell discusses Cocaine Bear and The Diplomat.
| 1394 | April 11, 2023 | Jennifer Garner, Representative Katie Porter | N/A |
Rescue Dog Rescue with Jennifer Garner. Jennifer Garner discusses The Last Thing He Told Me. Representative Katie Porter discusses recent politics and her new book, I Swear. Stephen acknowledges the death of Al Jaffee.
| 1395 | April 12, 2023 | Steven Yeun, Joan Baez | N/A |
Late Show Presents: Meanwhile. Steven Yeun discusses Beef. Joan Baez discusses her new book, Am I Pretty When I Fly?
| 1396 | April 13, 2023 | Nicolas Cage | Christine and the Queens |
The Sound of Science. Nicolas Cage discusses Renfield. Christine and the Queens performs "To Be Honest" from his upcoming album Paranoïa, Angels, True Love.
| 1397 | April 17, 2023 | Josh Groban, Sheryl Lee Ralph | N/A |
Brunch Cam. A cameo appearance by Laura Benanti as Melania Trump. Josh Groban discusses Sweeney Todd: The Demon Barber of Fleet Street. Sheryl Lee Ralph discusses Abbott Elementary and her new book, Diva 2.0.
| 1398 | April 18, 2023 | Woody Harrelson & Justin Theroux | The Walkmen |
The Colbert-lorette. Late Show Presents: Meanwhile. Woody Harrelson & Justin Theroux discuss White House Plumbers. The Walkmen perform "The Rat" from their 2004 album Bows + Arrows.
| 1399 | April 19, 2023 | Elizabeth Olsen, Jena Friedman | N/A |
Elizabeth Olsen discusses Love & Death. Jena Friedman discusses her new book, Not Funny.
| 1400 | April 20, 2023 | Rachel Weisz, Danny Trejo | N/A |
Magic Cam-Dom. Late Show Presents: Meanwhile. Rachel Weisz discusses Dead Ringers. Danny Trejo steps into the kitchen with Stephen and discusses his new book, Trejo's Cantina. Stephen acknowledges the exit of James Corden from The Late Late Show.

=== May ===
| No. | Original release date | Guest(s) | Musical/entertainment guest(s) |
|---|---|---|---|
| 1401 | May 1, 2023 | Nicolas Cage, James Marsden | Joy Oladokun |
Stephen acknowledges the Writers Guild of America (WGA) strike. Nicolas Cage takes the "Colbert Questionert" (new footage from April 13 episode). James Marsden discusses Jury Duty. Joy Oladokun performs "Somebody Like Me" from her album Proof of Life.

=== October ===
| No. | Original release date | Guest(s) | Musical/entertainment guest(s) |
|---|---|---|---|
| 1402 | October 2, 2023 | Neil deGrasse Tyson | Louis Cato |
RICO Guilty. Neil deGrasse Tyson discusses the use of artificial intelligence and his new book, To Infinity and Beyond. Louis Cato performs "Reflections" from his new album of the same name.
| 1403 | October 3, 2023 | John Oliver | boygenius |
Jesus & Barnes: Messiah & Attorney. Late Show Presents: Meanwhile. Meanwhile Presents: Thenwhile. John Oliver discusses Strike Force Five. boygenius performs "Cool About It" from their album The Record.
| 1404 | October 4, 2023 | Anderson Cooper | Japanese Breakfast |
Breaking News. Cyborgasm. Anderson Cooper discusses recent politics and his new book, Astor. Japanese Breakfast performs "Kokomo, IN" from their album Jubilee.
| 1405 | October 5, 2023 | Bob Odenkirk, Fortune Feimster | N/A |
Late Show Presents: Meanwhile. Meanwhile Presents: Monkey on the Lam. Bob Odenkirk discusses the WGA strike and his new book, Zilot & Other Important Rhymes. Fortune Feimster discusses her new podcast, Handsome.
| 1406 | October 9, 2023 | Arnold Schwarzenegger | Metric |
Battleship: Trump Edition. Stephen acknowledges the Gaza war. First Drafts: Anniversary Cards, with Stephen's wife, Evie. Arnold Schwarzenegger discusses his new book, Be Useful: Seven Tools for Life. Metric performs "Just the Once" from their upcoming album Formentera II.
| 1407 | October 10, 2023 | Kerry Washington, Representative Maxwell Frost | N/A |
Late Show Presents: Meanwhile. Kerry Washington discusses her new book, Thicker than Water. Representative Maxwell Frost discusses recent politics.
| 1408 | October 11, 2023 | Senator John Fetterman, Melissa Villaseñor | N/A |
'Squatch Watch. Senator John Fetterman discusses his health issues and recent politics. Melissa Villaseñor discusses her comedy tour, The New Things, and her new book, Whoops... I'm Awesome.
| 1409 | October 12, 2023 | John Mulaney | Darius Rucker |
Late Show Presents: Meanwhile. John Mulaney discusses his comedy special, Baby J. Darius Rucker performs "Have a Good Time" from his album Carolyn's Boy.
| 1410 | October 16, 2023 | Jada Pinkett Smith, Ricky Velez | N/A |
Episode filmed from Stephen's home due to his COVID-19 diagnosis. Late Show Presents: Meanwhile. Jada Pinkett Smith discusses her new book, Worthy. Ricky Velez discusses his new comedy special, Here's Everything (special appearance by Pete Davidson).
| 1411 | October 23, 2023 | Daniel Radcliffe, Jonathan Groff & Lindsay Mendez | Arlo Parks |
Late Show Presents: Meanwhile. Daniel Radcliffe, Jonathan Groff & Lindsay Mendez discuss Merrily We Roll Along. Arlo Parks performs "Weightless" from her album My Soft Machine.
| 1412 | October 24, 2023 | Jim Gaffigan | Caroline Polachek |
Who Flips Next? The Sound of Science. Jim Gaffigan discusses his comedy tour, Barely Alive. Caroline Polachek performs "Dang".
| 1413 | October 25, 2023 | Talking Heads | Mae Martin |
Madame Caucasia's Wax Museum. Psycho Killers. Talking Heads discuss the 40th anniversary of Stop Making Sense. Mae Martin discusses her new comedy special, SAP.
| 1414 | October 26, 2023 | Keegan-Michael Key & Elle Key, John Carpenter | N/A |
Stephen acknowledges the mass shooting in Lewiston, Maine. A visit from George Santos (special appearance by Harvey Guillén). Keegan-Michael Key & Elle Key discuss their new book, The History of Sketch Comedy. John Carpenter discusses his new album, Anthology II: Movie Themes 1976–1988, and Suburban Screams.
| 1415 | October 30, 2023 | Henry Winkler, Melissa Etheridge | N/A |
Late Show Presents: Meanwhile. Henry Winkler celebrates his 78th birthday and discusses his new books, Being Henry and Detective Duck. Melissa Etheridge discusses her new book, Talking to My Angels, and her new show, My Window.
| 1416 | October 31, 2023 | John Dickerson | Alex Newell |
A Late Show Halloween intro (special appearance by John Carpenter). Breaking News. First Drafts: Halloween Cards, with Stephen's wife, Evie. John Dickerson discusses recent politics. Alex Newell performs "Independently Owned", from the Broadway play Shucked.

=== November ===
| No. | Original release date | Guest(s) | Musical/entertainment guest(s) |
|---|---|---|---|
| 1417 | November 1, 2023 | Representative Adam Kinzinger | Willie Nelson |
Road to the White House and/or Big House: Donald Trump v. The People: America Decides and/or Convicts. Stephen reveals Taylor Tomlinson as the host of After Midnight. Representative Adam Kinzinger discusses recent politics and his new book, Renegade. Willie Nelson performs "I Never Cared For You".
| 1418 | November 2, 2023 | Secretary Pete Buttigieg, Willie Nelson | N/A |
Road to the White House and/or Big House: Donald Trump v. The People: America Decides and/or Convicts. Late Show Presents: Meanwhile. Secretary Pete Buttigieg discusses recent politics. Willie Nelson discusses his induction into the Rock and Roll Hall of Fame and his new book, Energy Follows Thought.
| 1419 | November 13, 2023 | Barbra Streisand | N/A |
Barbra Streisand discusses her new book, My Name is Barbra.
| 1420 | November 14, 2023 | Rachel Maddow | Gracie Abrams |
Late Show Presents: Meanwhile. Meanwhile Presents: Flight Attention. Rachel Maddow discusses recent politics and her new book, Prequel: An American Fight Against Fascism. Gracie Abrams performs "I Know It Won't Work" from her album Good Riddance.
| 1421 | November 15, 2023 | Paul Giamatti, Tom Blyth | N/A |
The Thunda in the Rotunda: Capital Punishment in the Capitol: Congress Has Filed a Motion For Pain! Stephen Colbert Presents: That's Yeet: Dabbing on Fleek, Fam! Paul Giamatti discusses his podcast, CHINWAG, and The Holdovers. Tom Blyth discusses The Hunger Games: The Ballad of Songbirds & Snakes and Billy the Kid.
| 1422 | November 16, 2023 | Jonathan Karl, Maria Bamford | N/A |
Space News: Space Junk News. Space News: Space Mining News. Space News: Space Reproduction News. Space News: Rock 'N' Roll in Space News. Space News: Space College News. Space News: Space Paparazzi News. Jonathan Karl discusses his new book, Tired of Winning. Maria Bamford discusses her new book, Sure, I'll Join Your Cult, and her upcoming stand-up special, Local Act.
| 1423 | November 20, 2023 | David Letterman | The National |
David Letterman discusses his post-Late Show life. David Letterman and Stephen recreate a selfie from the latter's 2014 appearance at the former's Late Show. The National performs "Space Invaders" from their album Laugh Track.
| 1424 | November 21, 2023 | Bradley Cooper, José Andrés | N/A |
The Late Show's Reality Lineup. Bradley Cooper discusses Maestro. José Andrés steps into the kitchen with Stephen and discusses his new book, Feeding Dangerously.
| 1425 | November 22, 2023 | Peter Dinklage, Tig Notaro | N/A |
Late Show Presents: Meanwhile. Peter Dinklage discusses The Hunger Games: The Ballad of Songbirds & Snakes. Tig Notaro discusses her podcast, Handsome.

=== December ===
| No. | Original release date | Guest(s) | Musical/entertainment guest(s) |
|---|---|---|---|
| 1426 | December 11, 2023 | Representative Liz Cheney | Olivia Rodrigo |
Stephen discusses his recent surgical operation on his ruptured appendix. Representative Liz Cheney discusses recent politics and her new book, Oath and Honor. Olivia Rodrigo performs "Can't Catch Me Now" from The Hunger Games: The Ballad of Songbirds & Snakes soundtrack.
| 1427 | December 12, 2023 | Taraji P. Henson, Jake Gyllenhaal | Jason Isbell and the 400 Unit |
Late Show Presents: Meanwhile. Taraji P. Henson discusses The Color Purple. Jake Gyllenhaal takes "The Colbert Questionert" (new footage from November 23, 2022 episode). Jason Isbell and the 400 Unit perform "King of Oklahoma" from their album Weathervanes.
| 1428 | December 13, 2023 | Jason Momoa, Robert Smigel | N/A |
Rescue Dog Rescue with Jason Momoa. Jason Momoa discusses Aquaman and the Lost Kingdom. Robert Smigel discusses Leo.
| 1429 | December 14, 2023 | Greta Gerwig, Andrew Scott | N/A |
A special appearance by Oprah Winfrey. Late Show Presents: Meanwhile. Greta Gerwig discusses Barbie. Andrew Scott discusses All of Us Strangers.
| 1430 | December 18, 2023 | Kenan Thompson | Olivia Rodrigo |
First Drafts: Holiday Cards, with Stephen's wife, Evie. Kenan Thompson discusses his tenure in Saturday Night Live and his new book, When I Was Your Age. Olivia Rodrigo performs "Vampire" from her album Guts.
| 1431 | December 19, 2023 | Adam Driver, Jon Batiste | Jon Batiste |
Late Show Presents: Meanwhile. Adam Driver discusses Ferrari. Jon Batiste discusses American Symphony and his new album, World Music Radio. Jon Batiste performs "Butterfly".
| 1432 | December 20, 2023 | Nicki Minaj | N/A |
The Late Show Presents: "The Indict-mare Before Christmas", narrated by Liam Neeson. Nicki Minaj discusses her new album, Pink Friday 2.
| 1433 | December 21, 2023 | Anderson Cooper and Andy Cohen | Louis Cato and The Late Show Band |
Late Show Presents: Meanwhile. Anderson Cooper and Andy Cohen discuss their upcoming coverage of CNN's New Year's Eve Live show. Louis Cato and the Late Show Band perform a special rendition of "Winter Wonderland".
