= U&ME =

Single by Alt-J

from the album The Dream
- Released: September 22, 2021
- Genre: Indie rock
- Length: 3:19
- Label: Canvasback; Infectious
- Songwriters: Joe Newman, Thom Sonny Green, Gus Unger-Hamilton
- Producer: Charlie Andrew

Alt-J singles chronology
"Pleader" (2017)	"U&ME" (2021)	"Get Better" (2021)

"U&ME" is a song by British indie rock band Alt-J. It was released alongside the announcement of their fourth album The Dream on September 22, 2021, as the first single from the album, and the second on the album's tracklist.

== Writing and composition ==
"U&ME" was written by Alt-J frontman Joe Newman and is largely based on a real-life experience at the Sun Cycle Festival in Melbourne, which he attended with his partner. Newman stated that "two-thirds of the writing" for the song was directly inspired by the event, grounding the track in autobiographical detail.

The song has been described as a love story constructed from fragmented memories, capturing a sense of pre-pandemic togetherness and nostalgia. Musically, it is characterized by a relaxed, stripped-back style consistent with the band's blend of indie rock and experimental pop. In interviews surrounding The Dream, the band also framed the track around themes of joy and intimacy, reflecting a moment where "nothing could be any better than it is right now".

Lyrically, "U&ME" juxtaposes realism with surrealism. While much of the narrative reflects genuine experiences, Newman deliberately exaggerated elements in the song's final section, introducing what he described as a "devolving, druggy madness" that is "completely fictitious".

== Music video ==
The music video for "U&ME" was directed by Prosper Unger-Hamilton, the brother of band member Gus Unger-Hamilton, and released on 22 September 2021. It was produced by MrMr Films and marked one of the first occasions in which all members of Alt-J prominently appear together in a music video.

The video is set primarily at a skatepark and draws inspiration from 1990s skate videos, incorporating lo-fi cinematography and stylized visual effects.It depicts the band navigating the environment while experiencing increasingly surreal and distorted imagery, including exaggerated obstacles and hallucinatory sequences.

== Critical reception ==
"U&ME" received generally positive reviews from music critics, who highlighted its nostalgic tone and understated production. Writing for ABC's triple j, Al Newstead described the track as a "stripped-back" and reflective lead single that captures a sense of pre-pandemic togetherness, with its festival-inspired narrative contributing to a warm, intimate atmosphere. Critics also noted the song’s blend of realism and surrealism, particularly in its closing section, as a continuation of Alt-J's distinctive songwriting style.

Reviews of The Dream frequently singled out "U&ME" as a standout track. NME described the song as one of the album’s most immediate and accessible moments, emphasizing its themes of joy and escapism while situating it within the record’s broader exploration of memory and fantasy. Similarly, other critics noted that the track’s relaxed groove and emotional clarity made it an effective introduction to the album’s tone and lyrical concerns.

== Remix ==
The track was later remixed by American DJ Baauer.
