= Getting Better (disambiguation) =

"Getting Better" is a 1967 song recorded by the Beatles, written by John Lennon and Paul McCartney.

Getting Better may also refer to:

- "Getting Better" (Shed Seven song), a single released in 1996
- "Gettin' Better", a track from the album Mechanical Resonance by Tesla, 1986

== See also ==
- "It's Getting Better All the Time", a single by American country music group Brooks & Dunn
- "Keeps Gettin' Better", a single by American singer Christina Aguilera
- Keeps Gettin' Better: A Decade of Hits, an album by American singer Christina Aguilera
- "My Dreams Are Getting Better All the Time", a popular song published in 1945
- "Every day, in every way, I'm getting better and better", the mantra of Émile Coué
- "It's Getting Better", a 1969 hit single by Cass Elliot
- "Getting Better All the Time', song on Pink Floyd bootleg recordings
