= Get Better (Alt-J song) =

Single by Alt-J

from the album The Dream
- Released: November 3, 2021
- Genre: Indie rock
- Length: 5:51
- Label: Canvasback; Infectious
- Songwriters: Joe Newman, Thom Sonny Green, Gus Unger-Hamilton
- Producer: Charlie Andrew

Alt-J singles chronology
"U&ME" (2021)	"Get Better" (2021)	"Hard Drive Gold" (2022)

"Get Better" is a song by British indie rock band Alt-J, from their fourth studio album The Dream. It was released as the second single from the album on November 3, 2021, and is the fifth track on the album's tracklist.

== Writing and composition ==
"Get Better" is one of the most lyrically narrative-driven tracks on The Dream. The song is structured as a chronological story, following a couple's relationship from early domestic intimacy through to illness and eventual loss. Frontman Joe Newman has described it as one of the band’s most direct and linear compositions, deliberately avoiding the fragmented or abstract lyricism often associated with their earlier work.

Lyrically, the song juxtaposes mundane, everyday details with increasingly heavy subject matter, documenting the progression of a serious illness and its emotional impact. Critics have noted that this storytelling approach reflects the band’s intention to explore more grounded and human themes across the album.

Musically, "Get Better" is comparatively restrained, built around a slow tempo and minimal arrangement that foregrounds the vocal narrative. The composition gradually builds in intensity, mirroring the escalating emotional stakes of the lyrics, before resolving in a subdued and reflective conclusion. This dynamic progression has been interpreted as reinforcing the song’s themes of decline, grief, and acceptance, aligning with the broader tonal contrasts present throughout The Dream.

== Music video ==
The music video for "Get Better" was directed by Stefanie Grunwald and released in November 2021.

The video is made up of pixelated art showing a woman standing in a hospital room with a black cat outside, and a man solemnly sitting around a house. The video features repeated imagery of a building in the background with the silhouettes of the man and woman outside of it, before ending with them walking in holding hands, followed by footage of the man lying alone in bed.

== Critical reception ==
"Get Better" was widely praised by critics. Reviews of The Dream frequently identified the track as one of the album’s most powerful moments, noting its departure from Alt-J's typically abstract lyricism in favor of a more direct and linear storytelling approach.

Critics emphasized the song's detailed depiction of illness and loss, with its use of everyday imagery and chronological structure contributing to what many described as a deeply affecting listening experience. NME referred to the track as one of the band’s most devastating compositions, underscoring its portrayal of grief and emotional decline.

The song's restrained musical arrangement was also noted as a key strength, allowing the lyrics to take prominence and enhancing its emotional impact. Several reviewers described "Get Better" as a standout track on the album, commending its balance of subtle instrumentation and intense subject matter.
