= The Dream (Alt-J album) =

Studio album by Alt-J
- Released: 12 February 2022
- Genre: Art pop; alternative rock; indie rock
- Length: 49:22
- Label: Canvasback; Infectious
- Producer: Charlie Andrew

Alt-J chronology
Reduxer (2018)	The Dream (2022)

Singles from The Dream
- 1. "U&ME" Released: 22 September 2021; 2. "Get Better" Released: 3 November 2021; 3. "Hard Drive Gold" Released: 5 January 2022; 4. "The Actor" Released: 7 February 2022

The Dream is the fourth studio album by English indie rock band Alt-J, released on 11 February 2022 by Infectious Music and the Canvasback Music division of Atlantic Records. It was promoted with the single "U&ME", which was released alongside the album's announcement on 22 September 2021. The track listing for the album was also revealed on this date through publication Stereogum. "Get Better" was released as the album's second single on 3 November 2021 and was accompanied by a pixel-art music video. "Hard Drive Gold" was released as the album's third single on 5 January 2022. "The Actor" was released as the fourth single on 7 February 2022.

== Artwork ==
The artwork for The Dream's cover is a drawing by the artist Joel Wyllie.

== Critical reception ==
Professional ratings
Aggregate scores
Source	Rating
AnyDecentMusic?	7.8/10
Metacritic	79/100
Review scores
Source	Rating
AllMusic	4/5 stars
Beats Per Minute	64%
Clash	7/10
DIY	4/5 stars
Gigwise	8/10 stars
The Independent	4/5 stars
The Line of Best Fit	8/10
NME	4/5 stars
PopMatters	8/10
Uncut	6/10

The album received a four-star rating from The Observer, who said it was a "stroll around the curiosity shop". In the same review the band's embrace of American sounds was noted.

== Track listing ==
All tracks are written by Joe Newman, Thom Sonny Green, and Gus Unger-Hamilton.

The Dream track listing
No.	Title	Length
1.	"Bane"	5:10
2.	"U&ME"	3:18
3.	"Hard Drive Gold"	2:38
4.	"Happier When You're Gone"	4:00
5.	"The Actor"	4:00
6.	"Get Better"	5:51
7.	"Chicago"	3:55
8.	"Philadelphia"	3:38
9.	"Walk a Mile"	6:29
10.	"Delta"	1:00
11.	"Losing My Mind"	4:42
12.	"Powders"	4:41
Total length:		49:22

Deluxe edition
No.	Title	Length
13.	"The Actor" (Single Edit)	3:07
14.	"U&ME" (Single Edit)	3:16
15.	"Hard Drive Gold" (Loor Remix)	4:03
16.	"Hard Drive Gold" (Maya Jane Coles Remix)	5:13
17.	"U&ME" (Baauer Remix)	4:54
Total length:		69:55

Digital deluxe edition
No.	Title	Length
13.	"Oceans Are Forming" (Demo)	4:07
14.	"Hard Drive Gold" (Loor Remix)	4:03
15.	"U&ME" (The De Beauvoir Session)	3:13
16.	"Get Better" (The De Beauvoir Session)	5:25
17.	"Matilda" (The De Beauvoir Session)	3:51
Total length:		70:01

CARBS remix edition
No.	Title	Length
13.	"The Dream" (CARBS Cycles Remix)	9:40
14.	"The Dream" (CARBS Lucid Remix)	4:53
15.	"The Dream" (CARBS NREM Remix)	5:02
Total length:		68:57

== Personnel ==
Alt-J

- Joe Newman – vocals, guitar (all tracks), additional percussion (2)
- Thom Sonny Green – drums, percussion, programming (all tracks); additional percussion (2), spoken voice (12)
- Gus Unger-Hamilton – keyboards, synthesizer (all tracks); backing vocals (1, 3–12), organ (1, 2, 4, 6, 11), additional percussion (2), bass (3, 9, 11)

Additional musicians

- David Force – bagpipes (1), crumhorn (1, 2)
- Reinoud Ford – cello (1, 2, 4, 5, 7–9)
- Will Gardner – conductor, string arrangement (1, 2, 4, 5, 7–9); backing vocals (9)
- Tim Rundle – crumhorn (1, 2)
- Andy Marshall – double bass (1, 2, 5, 7–9)
- Charlie Andrew – programming (all tracks), additional percussion (2)
- Highgate School Choir – vocals (1–3)
- Tyler DeFord – sound effects (2)
- Matthew Ward – violin (2, 4, 5, 7, 9)
- Ciaran McCabe – violin (2, 4, 5, 7, 9)
- Kirsty Mangan – violin (2, 4, 5, 7, 9)
- Anna Zara Newman – spoken voice (3)
- Cordelia Unger-Hamilton – spoken voice (3)
- April Unger-Hamilton – backing vocals (4, 5), spoken voice (6)
- Sarah Andrew – bassoon (4)
- Trevor Mires – trombone (6)
- Christie Valeriano – backing vocals (8)
- George Eddy – backing vocals (9)
- Andrew Cohen – sound effects (9)
- Arianna Cohen – spoken voice (9, 12)
- Matt Glasbey – spoken voice (11)
- Mark Newman – spoken voice (11)

Technical

- Charlie Andrew – production, mixing
- Dick Beetham – mastering
- Matt Glasbey – mixing, engineering (all tracks); additional production (1, 10)
- George Collins – engineering assistance (1, 3, 10–12)
- Katie Earl – engineering assistance (1–4, 9–12)

== Charts ==
=== Weekly charts ===
Weekly chart performance for The Dream
Chart (2022)	Peak position
Australian Albums (ARIA)	6
Austrian Albums (Ö3 Austria)	9
Belgian Albums (Ultratop Flanders)	3
Belgian Albums (Ultratop Wallonia)	6
Canadian Albums (Billboard)	50
Dutch Albums (Album Top 100)	8
French Albums (SNEP)	27
German Albums (Offizielle Top 100)	5
Irish Albums (OCC)	6
Italian Albums (FIMI)	60
Lithuanian Albums (AGATA)	28
New Zealand Albums (RMNZ)	16
Portuguese Albums (AFP)	13
Scottish Albums (OCC)	2
Spanish Albums (Promusicae)	59
Swiss Albums (Schweizer Hitparade)	7
UK Albums (OCC)	3
UK Independent Albums (OCC)	1
US Billboard 200	110
US Top Alternative Albums (Billboard)	12
US Top Rock Albums (Billboard)	16

=== Year-end charts ===
Year-end chart performance for The Dream
Chart (2022)	Position
Belgian Albums (Ultratop Flanders)	110
