= Huntertones =

American band

- Also known as: Dan White Sextet
- Origin: Columbus, Ohio, U.S.
- Genres: Jazz; jazz fusion
- Years active: 2010–present
- Members: Dan White; Chris Ott; Jon Lampley; Adam DeAscentis; John Hubbell; Josh Hill
- Past members: Jeff Bass; Theron Brown
- Website: huntertones.com

Huntertones are an American band formed in Columbus, Ohio, in 2010 by saxophonist Dan White, and as of 2025, based in Brooklyn, New York. Known for their high-energy sound, the band's line-up also includes trombonist Chris Ott and trumpet/sousaphone player Jon Lampley.

Originally named the Dan White Sextet, the band was formed when White, Ott, and Lampley were students at Ohio State University. The Dan White Sextet released their debut album The New York Sessions in 2012. They changed their name to Huntertones in 2014, and have embarked on concert tours across the United States and internationally, with their travels inspiring their 2018 album Passport.

== Discography ==
As the Dan White Sextet

- The New York Sessions (2012)
- Play (2013)
- Your Song (2014)

As Huntertones

- Huntertones (EP, 2015)
- Live (2016)
- Passport (2018)
- Time to Play (2021)
- Engine Co. (2023)
- Motionation (2024)
- Transmission (2026)

== Personnel ==
Current members

- Dan White – saxophone (2010–present)
- Jon Lampley – trumpet, sousaphone (2010–present)
- Chris Ott – trombone, beatbox (2010–present)
- Adam DeAscentis – bass guitar
- John Hubbell – drums
- Josh Hill – guitar

Past members

- Jeff Bass – bass guitar
- Theron Brown – piano
