= The Temper Trap discography =

- Studio albums: 4
- Extended plays: 1
- Singles: 22

The discography of Australian indie rock band The Temper Trap consists of 4 studio albums and 22 singles. They are best known for their 2008 single "Sweet Disposition". The group formed in 2005 before going on a hiatus in 2018. They re-formed in 2025 and released their fourth studio album, Sungazer, in July 2026.

== Albums ==
=== Studio albums ===
List of studio albums, with selected details
Title	Album details	Peak chart positions										Certifications
Title	Album details	AUS	BEL	FRA	IRL	NLD	NZ	SCO	SWI	UK	US	Certifications
Conditions	Released: 19 June 2009; Label: Liberation (AUS), Infectious (UK), Glassnote (US)	9	66	173	18	63	—	27	—	25	175	ARIA: Platinum; BPI: Gold; RMNZ: Platinum
The Temper Trap	Released: 5 June 2012; Label: Liberation (AUS), Infectious (UK), Glassnote (US)	1	65	—	25	50	25	25	53	17	83	ARIA: Platinum
Thick as Thieves	Released: 10 June 2016; Label: Liberation (AUS), Infectious (UK), Glassnote (US)	1	186	—	—	76	25	97	—	82	—	
Sungazer	Released: 10 July 2026; Label: Mushroom	9	—	—	—	—	—	55	—	—	—	
"—" denotes items which were not released in that country or failed to chart.

=== Remix albums ===
List of remix albums, with selected details
Title	Details
Conditions Remixed	Released: 2010; Format: CD; Label: Liberation Music, Infectious Records; Format: CD

== Extended plays ==
List of EPs, with selected details
Title	Details
The Temper Trap	Released: 2006; Label: Liberation Music (LIBEP8226.2); Format: CD

== Singles ==
List of singles, with selected chart positions shown
Title	Year	Peak chart positions										Certifications	Album
Title	Year	AUS	BEL (FL)	IRL	JPN	NLD	NZ	SCO	UK	US Bub.	US Rock	Certifications	Album
"Sweet Disposition"	2008	14	6	8	35	54	34	6	6	8	17	ARIA: 8× Platinum; BPI: 4× Platinum; RIAA: Platinum; RMNZ: 5× Platinum	Conditions
"Science of Fear"	2009	— (Note: "Science of Fear" did not enter the Australian ARIA Singles Chart but peaked at number 15 on the ARIA Hitseekers Chart.)	—	—	—	—	—	24	— (Note: "Science of Fear" did not enter the UK Singles Chart, but peaked at number 43 on the UK Physical Singles Chart.)	—	—		Conditions
"Fader"	2009	47	—	—	—	—	—	55	76	—	25	ARIA: Platinum; RMNZ: Gold	Conditions
"Love Lost"	2010	32	—	—	—	—	—	—	187	—	—	ARIA: Platinum	Conditions
"Need Your Love"	2012	39	—	—	56	—	—	—	— (Note: "Need Your Love" did not enter the UK Singles Chart, but peaked at number five on the UK Physical Singles Chart.)	—	— (Note: "Need Your Love" did not enter the US Hot Rock & Alternative Songs chart, but peaked at number 38 on the US Alternative Airplay chart.)	ARIA: Gold	The Temper Trap
"Trembling Hands"	2012	38	—	—	—	—	—	—	— (Note: "Trembling Hands" did not enter the UK Singles Chart, but peaked at number 23 on the UK Physical Singles Chart.)	—	—	ARIA: Platinum	The Temper Trap
"Miracle"	2012	—	—	—	—	—	—	—	—	—	—		The Temper Trap
"Thick as Thieves"	2016	92	—	—	—	—	—	—	—	—	—		Thick as Thieves
"Fall Together"	2016	50	—	—	—	—	—	—	—	—	—		Thick as Thieves
"Alive"	2016	—	—	—	—	—	—	—	—	—	—		Thick as Thieves
"Lost"	2016	—	—	—	—	—	—	—	—	—	—		Thick as Thieves
"Under the Milky Way"	2023	—	—	—	—	—	—	—	—	—	—		Mushroom: Fifty Years of Making Noise (Reimagined)
"Sweet Disposition (A Moment, a Love)" (with Lost Frequencies)	2025	—	6	—	—	— (Note: "Sweet Disposition (A Moment, a Love)" did not enter the Netherlands Single Top 100 but peaked on the Netherlands Single Tip Chart at number 14.)	— (Note: "Sweet Disposition (A Moment, a Love)" did not enter the NZ Top 40 Singles Chart, but peaked at number 39 on the NZ Hot Singles Chart.)	—	—	—	—		Non-album single
"Lucky Dimes"	2025	—	—	—	—	—	—	—	—	—	—		Sungazer
"Giving Up Air"	2025	—	—	—	—	—	—	—	—	—	— (Note: "Giving Up Air" did not enter the US Hot Rock & Alternative Songs chart, but peaked at number 32 on the US Alternative Airplay chart.)		Sungazer
"Into the Wild"	2026	—	—	—	—	—	—	—	—	—	—		Sungazer
"Sungazer"	2026	—	—	—	—	—	—	—	—	—	—		Sungazer
"These Arms"	2026	—	—	—	—	—	—	—	—	—	—		Sungazer
"Kuru"	2026	—	—	—	—	—	—	—	—	—	—		Sungazer
"Runaways"	2026	—	—	—	—	—	— (Note: "Runaways" did not enter the NZ Top 40 Singles Chart, but peaked at number 33 on the NZ Hot Singles Chart.)	—	—	—	—		Sungazer
"Wide Open Road"	2026	—	—	—	—	—	—	—	—	—	—		Forever Young by War Child Australia
"Sign of the Times" (Like a Version)	2026	—	—	—	—	—	—	—	—	—	—		Non-album single
"Slide"	2026	—	—	—	—	—	—	—	—	—	—		Non-album single
"—" denotes items which were not released in that country or failed to chart.
