= Thick as Thieves (The Temper Trap album) =

2016 studio album by the Temper Trap

Studio album by The Temper Trap
- Released: 10 June 2016
- Recorded: February 2013 – October 2015
- Studios: La Casa Artist Residency (Byron Bay, New South Wales); The Temper Trap Studio (London, England); Golden Ratio Studios (Montreal, Quebec)
- Genre: Indie rock
- Length: 45:01
- Labels: Liberation (AUS); Infectious (UK); Glassnote (US)
- Producer: Rich Cooper

The Temper Trap chronology
The Temper Trap (2012)	Thick as Thieves (2016)	Sungazer (2026)

Singles from Thick as Thieves
- 1. "Thick as Thieves" Released: 29 February 2016; 2. "Fall Together" Released: 12 April 2016; 3. "Alive" Released: 3 June 2016; 4. "Lost" Released: August 2016

Thick as Thieves is the third studio album by Australian indie-alternative rock band The Temper Trap. It was produced by Rich Cooper and Damian Taylor. The album was released on 10 June 2016, by Liberation Music in Australia, by Infectious Records in the United Kingdom, and by Glassnote Records in the United States, and is the first to be co-written by the band with outside personnel. Thick as Thieves also marks the first album by the band without guitarist and founding member Lorenzo Sillitto, after his departure in late 2013.

Serving as a follow-up to their experimental, self-titled second studio album, Thick as Thieves reverts to a guitar-oriented sound reminiscent of their debut album, with lyrics inspired by various experiences by members of the band. Recording and production started in early 2013 at Byron Bay. The band changed their traditional method of song writing for Thick as Thieves, moving from development of ideas utilising jam sessions, to a streamlined process using various ideas by band members. Stumped by the departure of Sillitto, and fluctuating frequently between recording and touring, however, development spanned three years, mostly recorded with Taylor and engineer Russel Fawcus at the band's private studios in London in late 2014 and early 2015. Initially, finishing touches were recorded at Taylor's Golden Ratio Studios in Montreal in April 2015, but after numerous delays, even after initially tracking the album in April 2015, recording on the album was eventually completed in October 2015.

With its release formally announced in April 2016, the album was preceded by the appearances of title track "Thick as Thieves", and fifth track "Fall Together" on singles, in February and April 2016, respectively. Further promotion included a low-key headlining tour and an extensive festival tour in mid-2016 of Asia, Australia, Europe and the United States, and later an extensive tour of North America in late 2016. Upon release, Thick as Thieves was met with lukewarm positive reviews, though an improvement on the reception of the band's previous album. Critics mostly agreed on the quality of the album's sound and production, with a volume of praise being directed at lead singer Dougy Mandagi's vocals, but were otherwise divided on the album's lyricism and the lack of deviation from the band's previous material. In addition, Thick as Thieves topped the ARIA Albums Chart in the week of its release – the band's second album to do so.

== Background ==
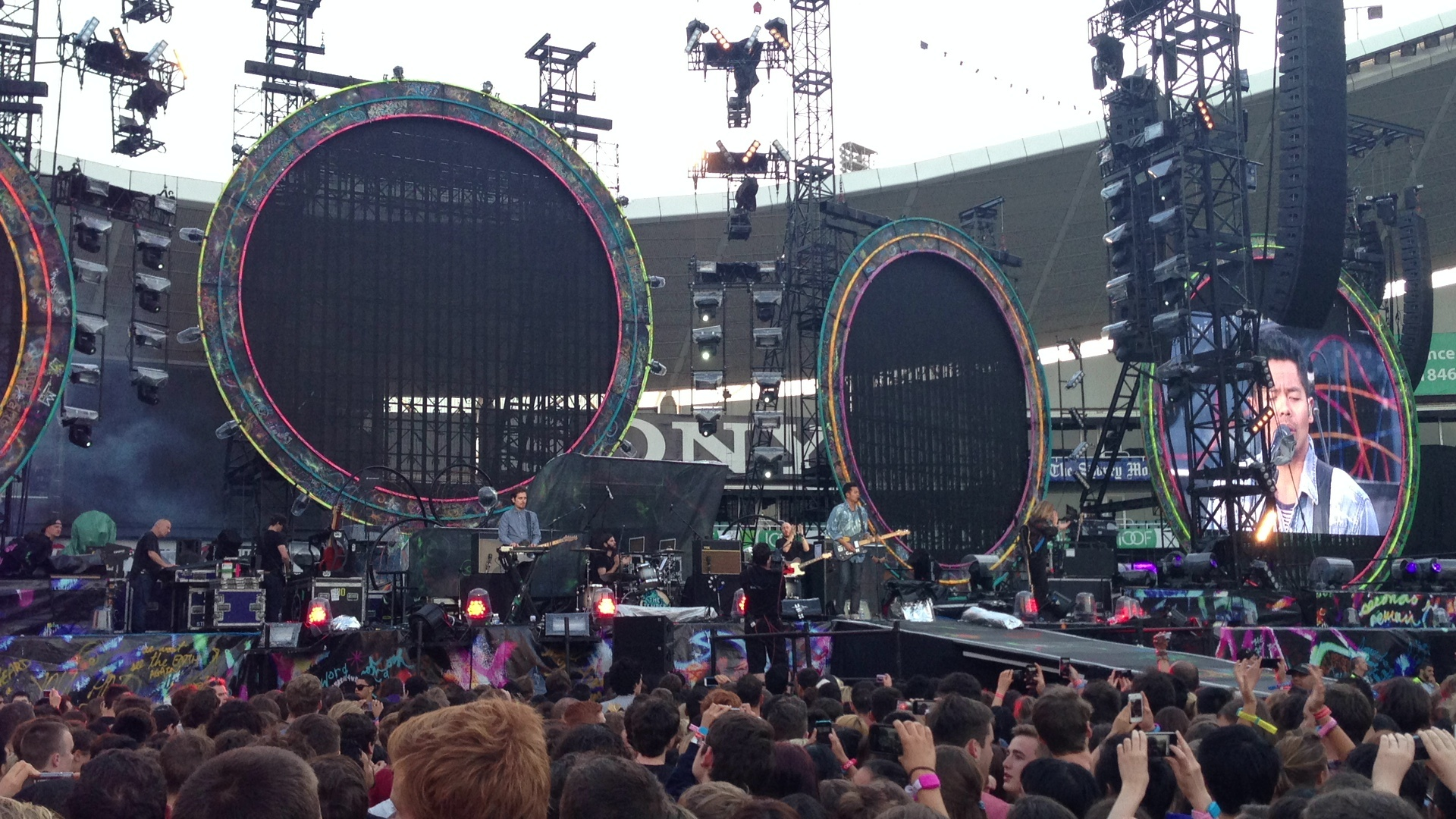
The Temper Trap, performing live in 2012 as supporting act on the Mylo Xyloto Tour. Their appearance followed the release of their eponymous second studio album.

After enjoying commercial and critical success with their debut album, Conditions, The Temper Trap released their eponymous second studio album, The Temper Trap, in May 2012. Produced with Tony Hoffer, and described as an album upon which the band expressed "willingness to experiment", it was a departure from the traditional rock sound of their debut, opting instead for an emphasis on electronically-oriented sounds contrasting greatly from the internationally successful hits of their previous album, "Sweet Disposition" and "Fader". The band achieved greater commercial success with the release of the album, peaking at no.1 on the Australian Recording Industry Association album chart in the week its release, surpassing the no.9 peak of Conditions. Within a year, the album went on to be certified Platinum by ARIA, with lead single track "Trembling Hands" also being certified Platinum, Despite these successes, however, overall sales of the album failed to match Conditions.

"We were definitely looking at our debut album as a reference point. We looked at Conditions and thought to ourselves, what are the things that are really good about that album, that made the fans fall in love with us in the first place? We took that, and applied it to this album. So it's a bit weird, but it's kind of looking back so we can look forward."

— Lead singer Dougy Mandagi

In addition to the short-lived success of the album, The Temper Trap itself was not received well by music critics, whom mostly gave the album a mixed response. Criticism was mostly aimed at the deviation from the precedent set by Conditions, with reviewers reaching a consensus that this ultimately had a negative impact on the music. For their third studio album, the band felt compelled to return to their traditional roots, after reviewing the response to The Temper Trap. The move was not an acceptance of critics' opinions on The Temper Trap, with lead singer Dougy Mandagi claiming that he was "glad" the band recorded the album. Rather, the move was made in pursuit of matching the success of Conditions, including the popularity of "Sweet Disposition" in particular. Guitarist Joseph Greer described the song as "the catalyst to everything", as it became the standard to which the band began to aim at with their third studio album. Bassist Jonathon Aherne described the feelings of the band, heading into recording their third studio album, as being "under pressure", a sentiment felt by all members of the band. Aherne was optimistic, however, stating, "as we've discerned and had feedback from album two, and reviewed our strengths from album one, there's a pretty clear vision of what we want to do."

== Composition and themes ==
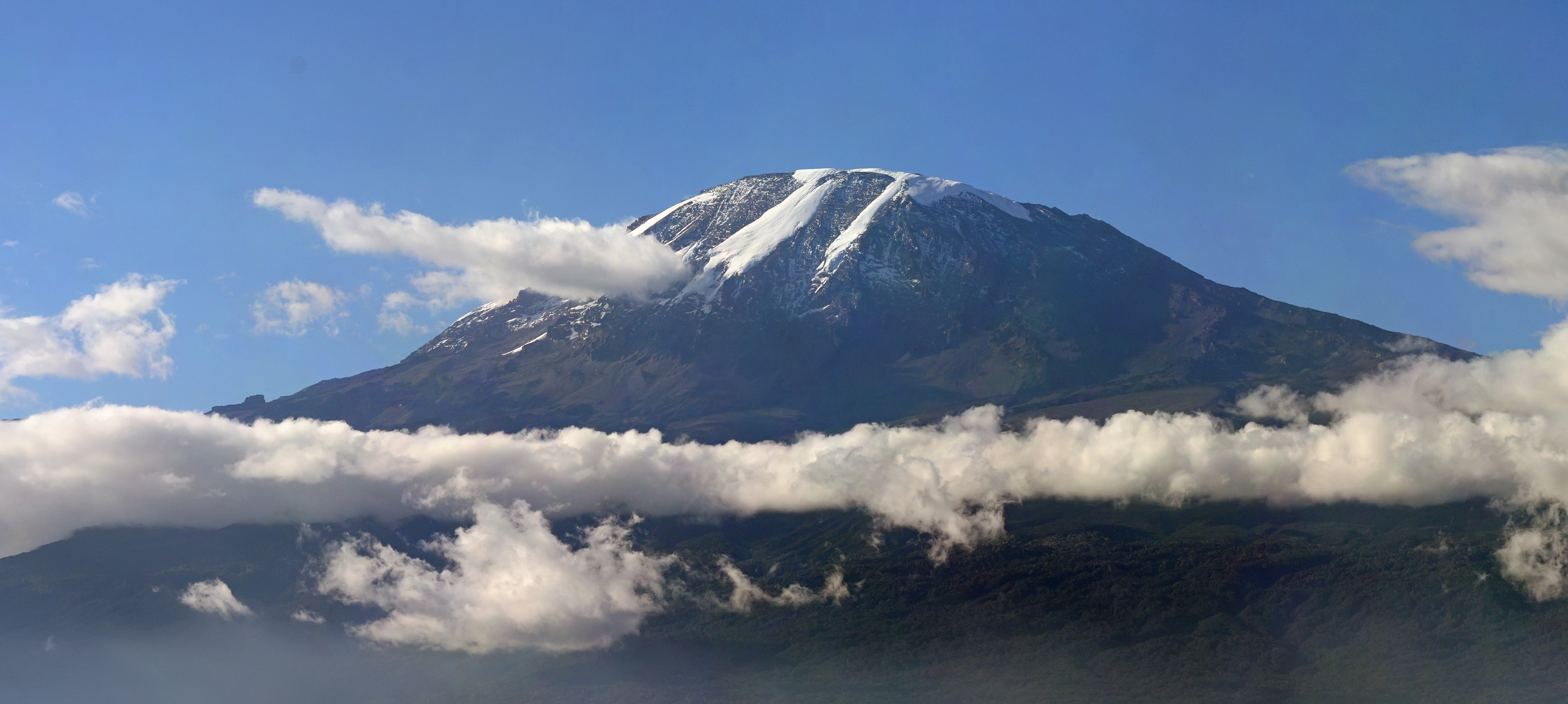
"So Much Sky" was inspired by Jonathon Aherne and Dougy Mandagi's charity visit to Tanzania, and the view of Mount Kilimanjaro from the nearby village they visited.

The band retreated to a "less synth and more guitar based" sound than their previous album, reminiscent of, and effectively reverting to, their debut album, Conditions. Marking a return to "passionate and positive themes of hope", the album was described by drummer Toby Dundas as "filled with hope, raw energy, and a passion that brought us back to the early days", and that the music possessed "grit and attitude". He also stated that the album's lengthy production had aided in the writing and recording of the songs, saying that the band "had the time and space to develop tracks in a way which allowed them to take on a new life during the process." Lead vocalist Dougy Mandagi additionally described the tracks on the album as "more upbeat, up-tempo songs compared to the last record [and] faster songs with a few sombre moments here and there." Additionally, Thick as Thieves is also the first time the band had invited songwriting personnel outside of the band to work on the album, which included producer Pascal Gabriel, who co-wrote most of the songs with the band, and Justin Parker, who co-wrote "Fall Together" with Mandagi. "Burn" and "Tombstone" are the only songs on the record that were solely written by the band.

The album's opening track, "Thick as Thieves", penned by the band with Gabriel, (Note: The writing credits attributed to "Thick as Thieves", "Fall Together", "Riverina", and "Ordinary World" are sourced from the American Society of Composers, Authors and Publishers' songwriting credits database, which can be found at this link.) was described by Emmy Mack of Music Feeds as a track that "thumps along" with a "tribal-style tom beat, wild west guitar arpeggios, [and] an Electric Light Orchestra-style bassline". Mandagi, who himself described the track as a "jangly guitar song", stated that he had the idea for the song's guitar riff for years, long before he had sat down with guitarist Joseph Greer and "worked it out in his old flat one day." Lyrically, the album was motivated by various experiences in each of the band members' personal lives. One such example is in the album's second track, "So Much Sky", inspired by bassist Jonathon Aherne and Mandagi's trip to Tanzania, meeting with the Massai tribe as part of an initiative with Faces4Hope, a Christian charity organization supporting villages and tribes in East Africa, with whom the band were involved with. The band had written the song mostly in the image of the Massai, their village, and the view of the nearby Mount Kilimanjaro. Mandagi explained, "being out in the open plains and waking up in the morning and seeing Mount Kilimanjaro popping up just above the clouds. It was a really inspirational experience and we got a song out of it." The third track on the album, "Burn", penned by the band with Parker, was noted by Dundas as one of the band's favorites on the record. Written early on in the recording sessions, "Burn" was built from two different compositions which were, according to Dundas, "gradually morphed together as one as we were recording." Kim Taylor Bennett of Noisey compared the track to "U2's sky-scraping bombast with a bass drum thwack and crash reminiscent of "Be My Baby" by The Ronettes." Mandagi touts "Alive", the sixth track on Thick as Thieves, as the band's "sexiest number for sure", with "all swagger and menacing bass lines." The song was further described by Laurence Day of The Line of Best Fit as one with a "quivering bassline and sharp, punchy beats, and a to-the-rafters chorus erupts to relieve the tension."

A song featured as the closing track on the deluxe edition of Thick as Thieves, "Closer", was written about Andrew Chan. Chan, along with Myuran Sukumaran, were charged and sentenced to death in 2005 for leading a heroin-smuggling operation in Indonesia, and made headline news in Australia after the newly-elected President of Indonesia, Joko Widodo, ordered their execution in early 2015 after an unusually prolonged period on death row, despite multiple calls for clemency internationally. Mandagi himself was a friend of Chan, corroborating with many who talked of Chan's positive attitude and personality. Mandagi spoke of Chan, "he brought a lot of change to a place that was rotting. It brought life into a third world prison, basically, he gave hope to a lot of people."

== Recording and production ==
Recording for the band's third studio album started relatively early, in February and March 2013, when the band spent a week-and-a-half with producer Malay. Lead vocalist Dougy Mandagi had met Malay during his stay in Los Angeles, and the two had a mutual admiration and respect for each other's work. Mandagi had been writing new ideas for songs during his stay in Los Angeles, while the rest of the band were at home in London, doing the same. While previously, the band made use of jam sessions to create new songs, the band opted instead to take different approaches to writing songs, such as combining various ideas, conceived by different members of the band, into single tracks. The band met up and held their first sessions at the La Casa Artist Residency, a recording studio situated in Byron Bay, New South Wales, and owned by American filmmaker Taylor Steele. Contrasting from a traditional recording studio, the residency was originally set up by Steele as a retreat for artists to spend time, between a few days to a few weeks, to "find inspiration and make art, with Byron Bay as their muse." The band spent a few weeks, over the course of two visits, at La Casa with Malay. The band amassed over thirty ideas for songs during the sessions, with "Lost" and "Summer's Almost Gone" being two of the earliest written and recorded tracks to eventually appear on the final album. According to drummer Toby Dundas, the band's experience with Malay opened them up to the idea of collaborating with other songwriters, an idea the band had previously rejected. Dunas explained, "if it had gone badly it might have left a bad taste in our mouths. But he bought something interesting to the table. We thought 'Look what happens when we work with people who bring their flavour to what we're doing' so we kept exploring that."

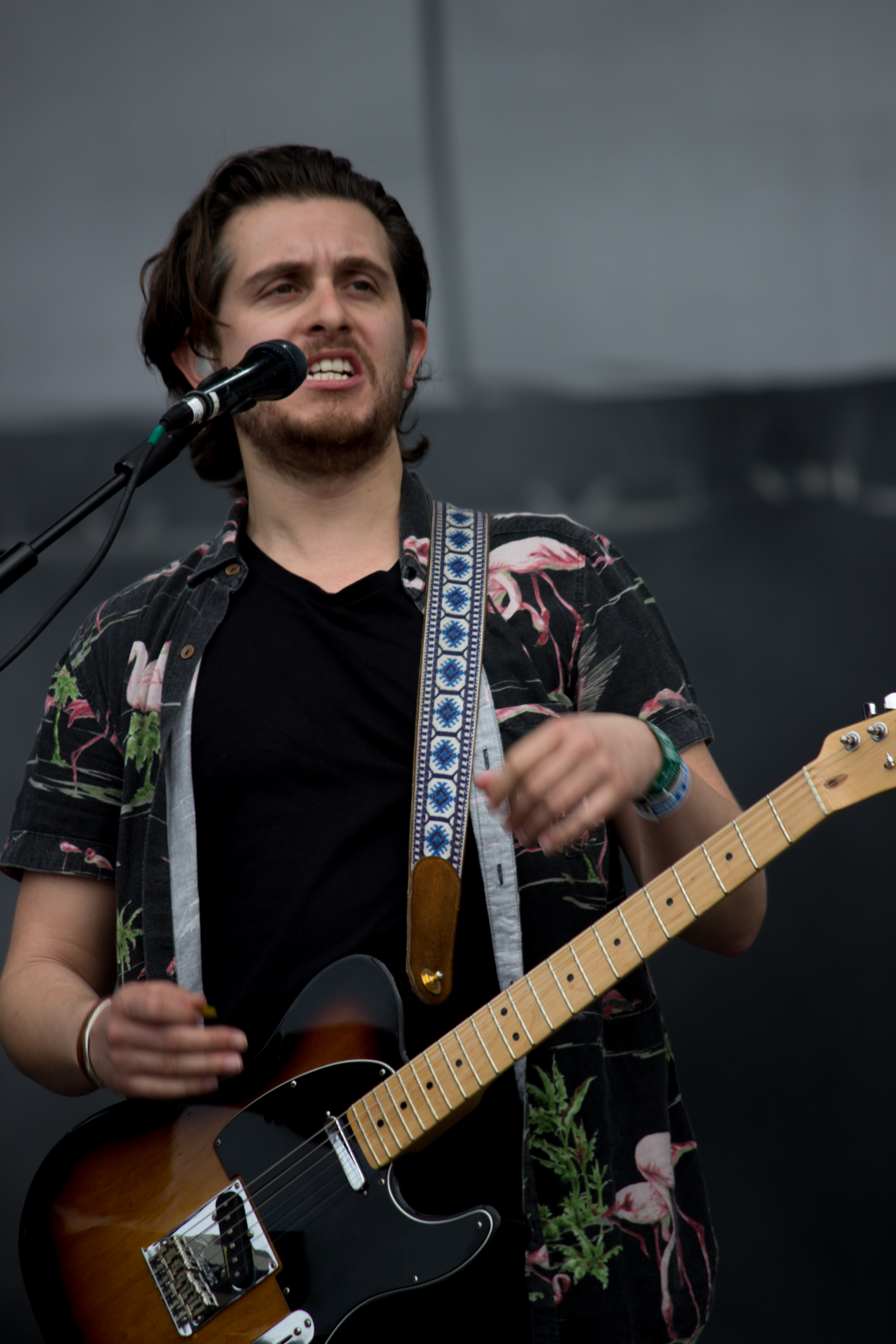
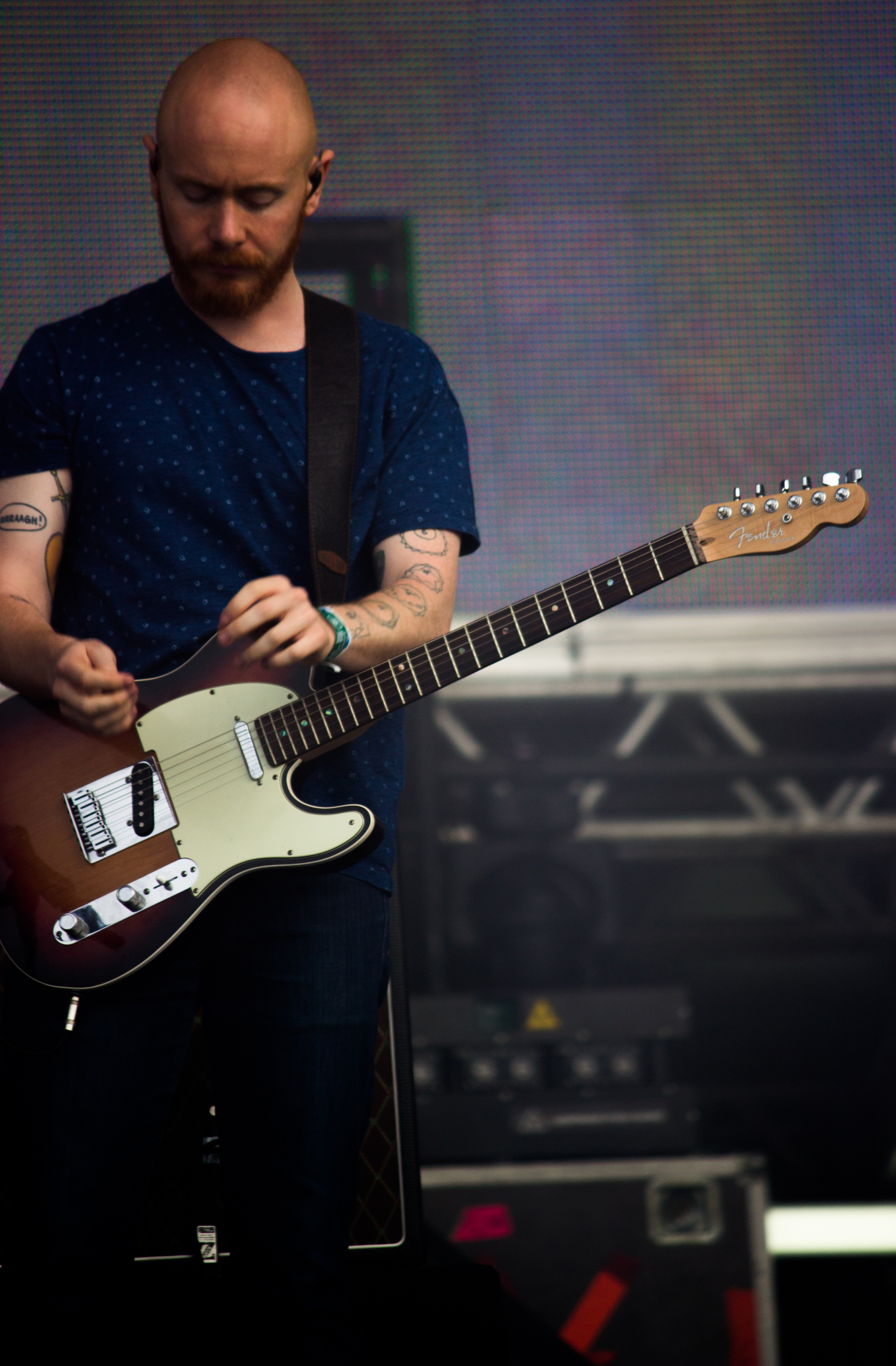
Guitarist and founding member, Lorenzo Sillitto (left), departed the band early on in the album's production, leaving Joseph Greer (right) to assume the role as lead guitarist.

Over the course of the year, the band fluctuated frequently between recording for the new album and touring in support of their previous studio album, The Temper Trap, which included a tour of the Australian east coast, music festival appearances such as Lollapalooza Chile and Wanderland, and serving as support for bands such as The Rolling Stones during the final leg of their 50 & Counting Tour. The album was on-pace for a slated early 2014 release, however, production was jolted by guitarist and founding member Lorenzo Sillitto's resignation from the band in late September 2013. Citing a need to "try new things" after spending over eight years with the band, his departure was not of ill-faith, with Sillitto describing his time in the band as "an amazing journey, an experience I will never forget and one that changed my life." A statement by the band, released later that same day, read in support of Sillitto, calling him "a great friend and a valued and important member of The Temper Trap since he joined in 2006." The statement further read, "his creativity and commitment to the band over the years has been first class and we wish him all the best with the exciting events that are about to come into his life; while we're sad to lose a guitarist, we are not losing a friend." After departing the band peacefully, with "zero drama", Sillitto moved back to the band's hometown of Melbourne, where he got married, started a family, and went on to become the manager of indie rock band Edward R. With Sillitto's departure, the band were reduced to four members once again; guitarist Joseph Greer was originally made the permanent fifth member of the band as its keyboardist and secondary guitarist to Sillitto's lead, after the release of Conditions. The workload heavily shifted towards Greer, once he became the band's lead guitarist, though Greer had stated that he had "really enjoyed the challenge", still maintaining a role with keyboard work, despite becoming the lead guitarist. The loss of a guitarist was an initial concern for the band when considering their live performances moving ahead, but they became used to the idea, after adopting the "raw [and] leaner sound" that came with fewer guitars on stage.

"We just want to get this one right and we really hoped that we would have had it done by then, but it just hasn't turned out that way. A lot has happened over the course of the last couple of years and we've just been writing and wanting to get it right. There's no point releasing something if we're not super happy about it."

— Guitarist Joseph Greer

Throughout the majority of 2014, work on the album progressed at the band's private recording studio in London, though, focus often diverted to other projects, such as a cover of David Bowie's "Five Years", released on Record Store Day, to celebrate the fifth anniversary of Infectious Records' relaunch. Dougy Mandagi also briefly parted from recording of the album, travelling back to Los Angeles to record vocals for electronic dance music artist Steve Angello's "Wasted Love". Recording was also briefly held in lieu of another headline and festival tour of Europe, North America, Asia and Australia, which played out from late 2014 to early 2015. It was during this time that the band were convinced that production on the album was nearly finished, with songs written for Thick as Thieves being played for the first time during this tour, to hype up its then-imminent release. Production continued, however, as the band started to write and record even more songs, delaying the album's release further.

During late 2014 and early 2015, the band moved recording and production over to Montreal, Quebec, at the Golden Ratio Studios, where they worked with Canadian music producer Damian Taylor, who had previously worked with American rock band The Killers on their 2011 album Battle Born, and as a creative companion to Icelandic musician Björk. An initial version of the album with 13 tracks was tracked at the end of April 2015, however, the creative process continued when additional songs were written and recorded for the album. Numerous delays pushed the recording and production of the album well into 2015, despite an open declaration early in that year, by Mandagi, that the album would be soon completed. By then, the band had collaborated with European producer Pascal Gabriel, co-writer and producer of various Marina and the Diamonds and Goldfrapp tracks, British songwriter and producer Justin Parker, known for his work with American recording artist Lana Del Rey, and American producer Ben H. Allen, who had previously produced albums for art rock acts Animal Collective and Deerhunter. Ultimately, in October 2015, 32 months after the band started production, amassing over 40 song ideas in the process, the album's production entered the audio mixing phase. Mandagi expressed dissatisfaction with the album's lengthy recording process, though insisted that he and the band were, in contrast, satisfied with the outcome and the final product, stating, "sometimes it was ok, sometimes it was a bit trying but you know nothing good comes easy we just had to keep at it. We didn't put it out until it was right, 'til we felt right."

== Packaging ==
The album's title, Thick as Thieves, a phrase typically used to describe a strong bond and chemistry between a group of people, was made as a reference to the band's own bond between each other, strengthened over the four years of recording the album. The album's liner notes include a thanks from Dougy Mandagi to "the all encompassing spirit, the alpha and omega through which I live and create." – a nod to both Mandagi and Jonathon Aherne's christian beliefs. Although Mandagi describes himself as "not a super religious person", he felt a desire to express his beliefs in the liner notes, in response to what Mandagi claims is a "cynical" attitude towards "anyone who has any belief." He further explained that, "for better or worse I learned a lot of things from religion. People say you don't need to attribute it to God, you don't need to learn what's right and wrong from the Church. Of course that's true, but it doesn't change the fact that's where I learnt right and wrong."

== Promotion ==
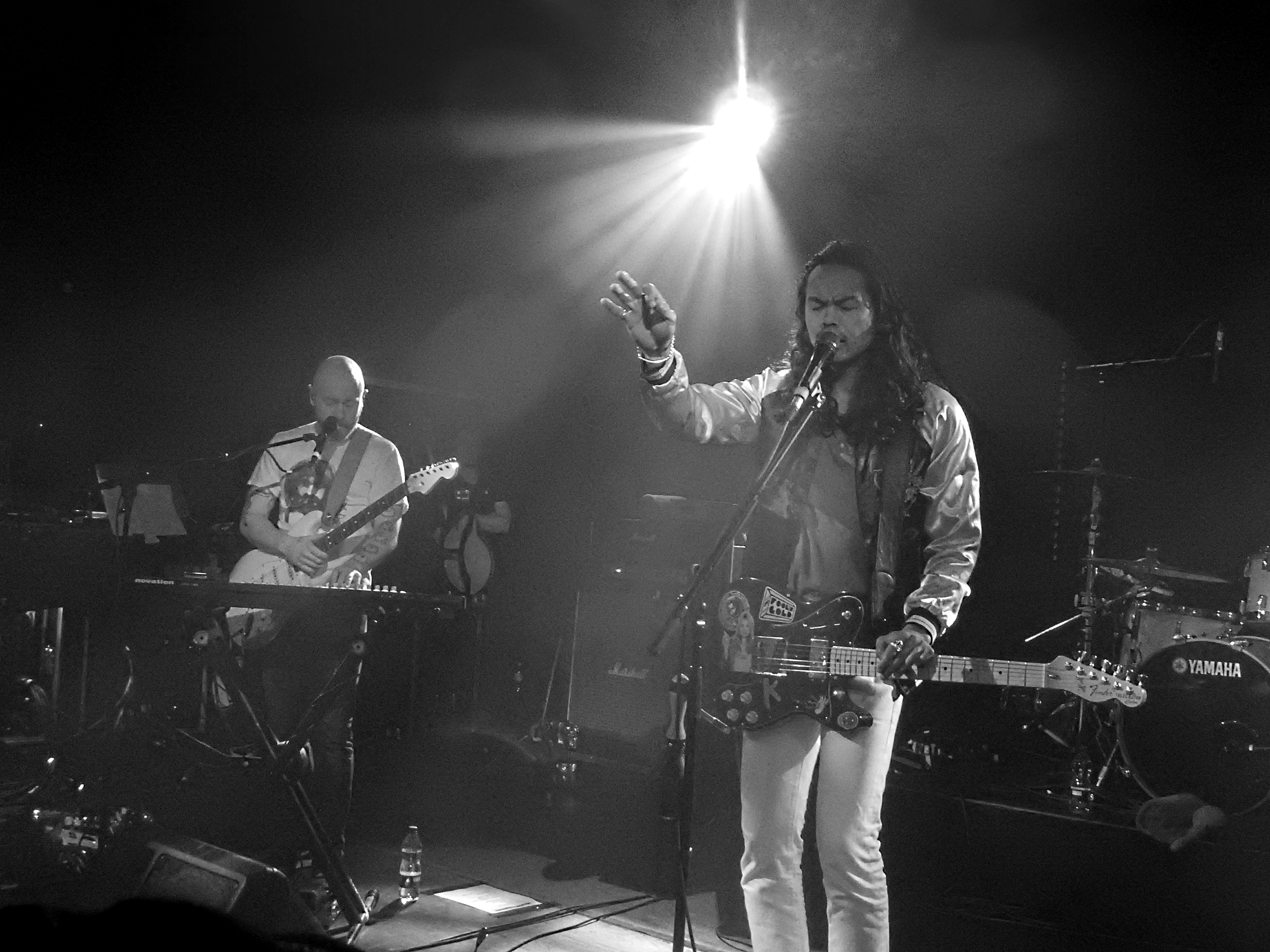
The Temper Trap performing at The Old Market in Brighton and Hove, as part of The Great Escape Festival, in May 2016.

Shortly before the album was completed and unveiled, the album's title track, "Thick as Thieves", was premiered on Australian youth radio station Triple J on the night of 28 February 2016, after the band announced the premiere on social media. The track also subsequently appeared on a single released the next day. On 11 April 2016, Thick as Thieves was officially unveiled by The Temper Trap, Liberation and Glassnote Records. The band wrote, in a press release regarding the announcement, "Finally it's here! No one can accuse us of rushing things. We're definitely slow burners when it comes to writing albums so we're beyond excited to share these new songs with you." The album's track list, artwork, and 10 June release date were detailed, with pre-orders for compact disc and digital download versions of the album, in addition to a limited-edition white vinyl 10" LP version of the album, becoming available on the same day. A deluxe edition of the album was also pressed, containing three additional tracks - "Providence", "On the Run", and "Closer". (Note: Citations for Australian release of Thick as Thieves (Deluxe Edition): Compact Disc, Digital download) In addition to the announcement, the album's fifth track, "Fall Together" was premiered through a video uploaded to the band's official YouTube channel, and appeared on a single, released in the United States on 12 April 2016. "Fall Together" was also solicited as a promotional single to United States Triple A and Alternative / Modern rock radio on 2 and 3 May 2016, respectively. In the weeks leading up to the release of the album, the band premiered the album's third track, "Burn", and sixth track, "Alive". They were both made available to download and stream on 19 May and 2 June, respectively. Each track's release were accompanied by music videos featuring the band performing the songs live.

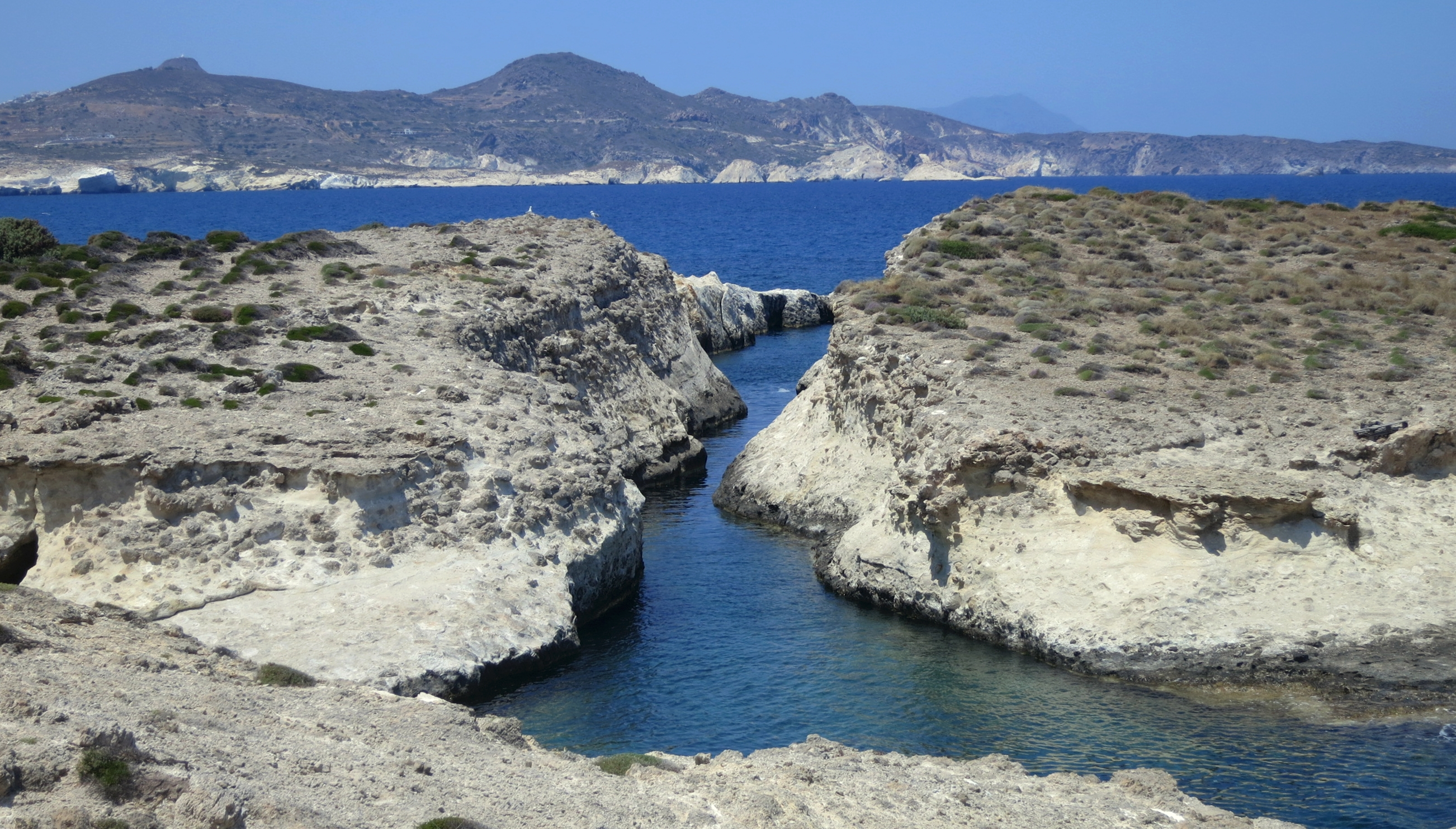
Landscape of Milos, Greece, where the band shot the music videos for "Fall Together" and "Lost" with Kris Moyes.

Music videos for tracks on Thick as Thieves saw the band take a different direction in visual presentation. While the band members themselves had avoided appearing at the center of their music videos previously, the videos for "Fall Together" and "Lost", both directed by acclaimed music video producer Kris Moyes and shot back-to-back on the island of Milos, Greece, feature them prominently. The band felt that they had become a mostly "faceless" band, and decided that starring in their music videos would help their identity and public image. Mandagi explained, "we just felt a lot of time had passed between album two and this one, and obviously Lorenzo left, so there's been changes. Let's come back and fully solidify our identity as a band, present ourselves as a solid unit, show our faces." The music video for "Fall Together" was released exclusively on 7 June 2016, three days before the release of Thick as Thieves, through The Wall Street Journal's Speakeasy subsite, with a synopsis by Dundas that reads, "four companions embark on an odyssey together, enduring challenges and rites of passage that will bond them in blood and experience."

The Temper Trap supported the release of Thick of Thieves with a limited-date tour and various appearances at worldwide music festivals, including We the Fest, Field Day, and the Dot to Dot Festival. Their headline tour included a tour of Australia, the United States, Europe and Asia, with the tour in Australia being their first major one in three years, after serving as a supporting act on the Mylo Xyloto Tour in 2012 and their Australian east coast tour in 2013. Their tour included a three-day venture in early May 2016, to small, intimate venues, consisting the Metro Theatre in Sydney, New South Wales, the Forum Theatre in Melbourne, Victoria, and The Triffid in Brisbane, Queensland. The band will also make appearances in similar venues in the United States in June 2016, at The Mezzanine and the Fonda Theatre in San Francisco and Los Angeles, California, and at the Webster Hall in New York City, New York. The band also performed at alike venues, including the O2 Academy in Oxford and The Moth Club in London, England. The band also embarked on a 23-date tour of North America, visiting 20 cities across 14 states and territories of the United States, and two provinces of Canada. Similar to the shows played during mid-2016, the North American tour was staged in small venues, including the Commodore Ballroom in Vancouver, British Columbia, and lasted from 19 September through to 19 October 2016. The tour was accompanied by alternative rock band Coast Modern, who served as opening act.

== Reception ==
Professional ratings
Aggregate scores
Source	Rating
AnyDecentMusic?	6.1/10
Metacritic	61/100
Review scores
Source	Rating
AllMusic	3.5/5 stars
Alternative Addiction	3.5/5 stars
Clash	4/10
The Courier-Mail	3.5/4 stars
FasterLouder	7/10 stars
Pitchfork	5.7/10
PopMatters	6/10 stars
Q	3/5 stars
Rolling Stone Australia	3/5 stars
The Sydney Morning Herald	3/4 stars

Thick as Thieves received mostly positive reviews from music critics. The album's production and sound, most notably lead singer Dougy Mandagi's vocals, were largely praised, with most critics agreeing that the decision to revert to a guitar-centric sound similar to their debut album, Conditions, improved the quality of the music from their previous album. Joseph Greer's guitar work and the album's musical composition and mixing was often highlighted as positives in reviews of Thick as Thieves. In contrast, however, critics were divided on the album's lyricism, with tracks such as "Burn" being positively highlighted, but those such as the pop-centric tracks "Lost" and "Fall Together" among those being negatively highlighted. Despite approval of the Conditions-esque sound, criticism was also aimed at the lack of deviation from the band's previous material.

The album's most positive review to date came from Cameron Adams, writing for the Brisbane-based newspaper The Courier-Mail. Adams approved the band's decision to follow up on the sound of their commercially successful debut album, Conditions, marking the album as "faithful" in his one-word description of the album. Adams noted "Lost" and "Fall Together" as the album's two potential hits, describing them as "better than 90-per-cent of what's in the charts and on the radio now." While he felt that the album "bit over-thought in parts - like they needed help to do what once came naturally to get the blasted record out", he concluded his review by stating that Thick as Thieves was "undeniably strong, if lacking risks - this is everything The Temper Trap do very well indeed." Also approving of the reversion to the sound of Conditions was Jules LeFevre of Australian music magazine website FasterLouder, who noted, "at first glance [the album] appears to be an attempt to reclaim the spotlight on the festival stages, but on closer inspection reveals a sturdy core." LeFevre praised Mandagi's falsetto vocals as the album's strongest element, claiming it to be the band's "edge", on top of the "colossal, anthemic choruses, sky high hooks, [and] guitar lines that push and push and push and explode." LeFevre continued by praising the largely guitar-driven composition of the record, in spite of Lorenzo Sillitto's exit, and commented positively on the "simpler, gritter, more blues and classic rock driven" guitars helmed by Joseph Greer. Contrasting to this, however, is LeFevre's sharp criticism of the album's lyricism, describing them as "cringe-worthy", and disapproving of songs such as "Lost" and "Fall Together", although stating that the lyrics felt "comfortable" in context of the music itself. Matt Collar of the American-based online music guide AllMusic noted that the departure of Sillitto and Greer's move into the role as lead guitarist had virtually no effect on the band's music. In writing a positive review for AllMusic, he also praised Mandagi's vocals as a "powerful and emotive" presence on the album, commenting on the "scintillating" combination of his vocals and the album's "thick wave of electric guitars, pulsing synths, and drums", comparing the sound to the music of Cee Lo Green and The Killers. Collar additionally described Thick as Thieves as "a heartfelt love letter to The Temper Trap's fans who have stuck with them since Conditions."

More critical reviews of the album included one from Craig Mathieson of daily newspaper The Sydney Morning Herald, who criticised the "stiff" social commentary of "Alive", and noted the album as having "little friction, [leading] to both an emotional vagueness and an anthemic quality that's curiously recessive." Mathieson, however, also praised Mandagi's vocals and commented positively on the band's use of "evocative textures" through the "artfully crafted" album, and otherwise praised the lyricism of "Burn", in particular. Dan Stapleton, writing for the Australian faction of the American-based music magazine Rolling Stone, was more critical of Thick as Thieves, describing the songs on the album as "[approximating] Coldplay at their least inspiring", citing the lyricism of "So Much Sky" and "Lost", in particular. He also noted, "to recapture their simple, early magic, the Temper Trap may need to put their obvious stadium ambitions on hold." Stapleton wasn't wholly critical of the album, though, approving of the more guitar-based sound in comparison to their previous album, and noting the title track and "Tombstone" as the strongest tracks on the record.

== Track listing ==
Thick as Thieves
No.	Title	Writer(s)	Length
1.	"Thick as Thieves"	Jonathon Aherne · Toby Dundas · Pascal Gabriel · Joseph Greer · Dougy Mandagi	3:53
2.	"So Much Sky"	Aherne · Ben H. Allen III · Dundas · Greer · Mandagi	4:28
3.	"Burn"	Aherne · Dundas · Greer · Mandagi	3:29
4.	"Lost"	Aherne · Allen · Dundas · Greer · Mandagi	4:32
5.	"Fall Together"	Aherne · Allen · Richard Scott Cooper · Greer · Mandagi · Justin Parker	3:20
6.	"Alive"	Aherne · Dundas · Gabriel · Greer · Mandagi	3:34
7.	"Riverina"	Aherne · Dundas · Gabriel · Greer · Mandagi	3:35
8.	"Summer's Almost Gone"	Aherne · Dundas · Greer · James Ryan Ho · Mandagi	5:08
9.	"Tombstone"	Aherne · Dundas · Greer · Mandagi	4:16
10.	"What If I'm Wrong"	Aherne · Allen · Dundas · Greer · Mandagi	4:54
11.	"Ordinary World"	Aherne · Dundas · Gabriel · Greer · Mandagi	3:52
Total length:			45:01

Thick as Thieves – deluxe edition
No.	Title	Writer(s)	Length
12.	"Providence"	Aherne · Dundas · Greer · Dann Hume · Mandagi	4:17
13.	"On the Run"	Aherne · Dundas · Greer · Mandagi	3:57
14.	"Closer"	Aherne · Dundas · Greer · Mandagi	3:46
Total length:			57:01

Thick as Thieves – Japanese CD deluxe edition
No.	Title	Writer(s)	Length
12.	"Need Your Love" (Acoustic)	Aherne · Dundas · Greer · Mandagi · Lorenzo Sillitto
13.	"Trembling Hands" (Acoustic)	Aherne · Dundas · Greer · Mandagi · Sillitto
14.	"The Sea Is Calling" (Acoustic)	Aherne · Dundas · Greer · Mandagi · Sillitto
15.	"Love Lost" (Acoustic)	Aherne · Mandagi · Sillitto
16.	"Science Of Fear" (Acoustic)	Mandagi
17.	"Fools" (Acoustic)	Mandagi · Sillitto

== Personnel ==
Credits adapted from Thick as Thieves liner notes.

The Temper Trap

- Jonathon Aherne – bass guitar
- Toby Dundas – drums, percussion
- Joseph Greer – guitars, keyboards
- Dougy Mandagi – vocals, guitars

Additional musicians

- Britini Blackketter – backing vocals (track 3, 9)
- Rich Cooper – drums (track 5), percussion (track 4, 5)
- Pascal Gabriel – keys (track 1, 6, 7, 11)
- Justin Parker – guitars (track 5)

Production

- Ben Allen – assistant producer (track 10)
- Rich Cooper – producer, programming (tracks 4, 5)
- Pascal Gabriel – programming (track 1, 6, 7, 11)
- Spike Stent – mixing (1–5, 7)
- Damian Taylor – producer (tracks 1–3, 6–11), mixing (tracks 6, 8–11)
- Russell Fawcus – engineer (tracks 1–3, 6–11), assistant producer (track 6)
- Bob Ludwig – mastering

Artwork

- Jonathon Aherne – cover art
- Jon Bergman – photography
- Steve Stacey – design

== Charts ==
Chart (2016)	Peak position
Australian Albums (ARIA)	1
Belgian Albums (Ultratop Flanders)	186
Belgian Albums (Ultratop Wallonia)	192
Dutch Albums (Album Top 100)	76
New Zealand Albums (RMNZ)	25
UK Albums (Official Charts)	82

== Release history ==
Region	Date	Label	Format	Catalog no.
Standard edition
Australia (Note: Citations for Australian release of Thick as Thieves: Compact Disc, Digital download, 10" LP record)	10 June 2016	Liberation	CD · Digital · 10" LP	LMCD0291 (CD); INFECT289LP (10-inch LP)
United Kingdom	10 June 2016	Liberation	Digital	—N/a
United States	10 June 2016	Glassnote	Digital	—N/a
Deluxe edition
Australia	10 June 2016	Liberation	CD · Digital	LMCD0292 (CD)
United Kingdom	10 June 2016	Liberation	Digital	—N/a
United States	10 June 2016	Glassnote	Digital	—N/a
