= Mushroom Group =

Australian music and entertainment company

- Industry: Music and entertainment
- Founded: 1972
- Founder: Michael Gudinski
- Headquarters: Melbourne, Victoria, Australia
- Key people: Matt Gudinski (CEO)
- Website: mushroomgroup.com

Mushroom Group is the largest independent music and entertainment company in Australia. It comprises more than two dozen companies. It has offices in Melbourne, Sydney, and Auckland with over 200 employees.

== History ==
The Mushroom Group was founded in 1972 in Melbourne by a 20-year-old Michael Gudinski with the formation of Mushroom Records, followed shortly afterwards with the addition of Mushroom Music Publishing and Premier Artists booking agency in 1973.

In 1978, the Group expanded to include The Harbour Agency, a Sydney-based booking agency which was Mushroom's first foray into the city. As of 2013, Mushroom has an office in Sydney with over 100 employees across all subsidiaries.

1979 saw the launch of Mushroom's flagship touring company, The Frontier Touring Company. Its inaugural tours were UK Squeeze and The Police in 1980. It has now grown to become Australasia's biggest tour promoter. Frontier celebrated their 500th tour in 2010 with Tom Jones.

In 1983, Mushroom launched Australian Touring Merchandise (ATM) which went on to become the largest music merchandise producer and distributor in the country. It merged with Love Police in 2010 to create Love Police ATM, which remains part of the Mushroom Group.

After a massively successful period in the mid-'80s, especially through Mushroom Records act Kylie Minogue, Mushroom launched Mushroom Distribution Services which distributed their own product alongside a catalogue which included Flying Nun amongst others. In the same period, Michael Gudinski also created Michael Gudinski Management which signed Jimmy Barnes as its flagship artist.

1995 marked the beginning of Mushroom Records expansion into the UK with the opening of a London office. In the same year, Mushroom Pictures was introduced as the Group's film arm. Productions include Chopper, Wolf Creek and the highly acclaimed Great Australian Albums television series.

1998 was an especially significant year for the Group, when Mushroom Records celebrated its 25th anniversary with a record-breaking concert at Melbourne's MCG. In the same year, the catalogue was bought by Warner Music for an undisclosed sum.

A year afterwards, Mushroom launched its first post-Mushroom Records label, Liberation Music. Since the sale of Mushroom Records, Liberation has become the flagship Mushroom label and the one Michael Gudinski has worked most closely with. Artists signed to the label include The Temper Trap, Dan Sultan, Adalita and Vance Joy.

Also in 1999, Mushroom Marketing launched and has provided music services for the likes of Coca-Cola, Telstra and McDonald's.

In 2001, Roundhouse Entertainment launched with their inaugural A Day On The Green concert, which has become an iconic festival series in Australian wineries and has featured the likes of Hall & Oates, Tom Jones, Elvis Costello and Alicia Keys.

Michael Gudinski's son Matt got his start in the family business in 2002 with the launch of his Illusive Sounds label imprint and touring company at the age of 18. Illusive's label has distributed Bliss N Eso, Owl Eyes, Clubfeet, Stonefield, Diafrix and Lowrider, while their touring division has brought out AlunaGeorge, Bruno Mars and Mark Ronson to name just a few. The year afterwards, Ivy League Records (home to Cloud Control, The Rubens, Josh Pyke and Alpine) joined the fold.

2006 saw the opening of an international label arm, Liberator Music, with a roster that includes Phoenix, Bloc Party, Dizzee Rascal, Tiesto, Local Natives and Chvrches.

In 2010, party promoter I Oh You launched his I Oh You record label through Mushroom. Some of the inaugural label signees were Bleeding Knees Club, DZ Deathrays and Snakataktal. In the same year, Matt Gudinski and booking agent Brett Murrihy formed a third Group booking agency called Artist Voice. Shortly afterwards, Mushroom launched another merchandise arm named Drawing Board, which provided creative services for artists.

In 2012, Michael Gudinski was honoured by his home city of Melbourne and named Melburnian of the Year for Mushroom's contribution to the local music scene. In the same year he was also listed in the #1 position in the AMID Power 50, a list of the top 50 most influential people in the Australian music industry.

In 2013, Mushroom Group celebrated its 40th anniversary with an event at Thousand Pound Bend featuring performances by Alt-J, British India, City Calm Down, Clubfeet, Owl Eyes, Snakadaktal, The Rubens, Vance Joy, and World's End Press. At the party, Matt Gudinski was announced as the new Executive Director of the Group alongside his father and CEO Michael.

In the same year, Mushroom acquired the Australian distribution rights for PIAS Entertainment Group and Intellitix technology. The year was capped off by the announcement that Future Entertainment joined Mushroom, which makes it currently the largest 100% Australian owned festival entity by virtue of ticket sales.

In March 2017, Mushroom Group appointed Chris Maund as Chief Operating Officer for its labels and publishing divisions. In July 2017, Mushroom Group launched Mushroom Creative House. The 100s + 1000s label was launched in May 2020, followed by Reclusive Records the month after.

In March 2021, Michael Gudinski died at his home in Melbourne, at the age of 68. The following month, Matt Gudinski assumed the role of CEO of Mushroom Group.

In July 2023, Mushroom Group launched Mushroom Booking Agency. As part of a major restructure of Mushroom Group, the company's recording, publishing and neighbouring rights functions were merged into a new division called Mushroom Music in July 2024. The labels Liberation Records, Ivy League Records, Bloodlines, Liberator Music, Soothsayer and 100s + 1000s were consolidated into Mushroom Music. Mushroom Connect, a talent management and partnerships agency, was also launched that month.

== Subsidiaries ==
The company has a number of divisions and subsidiaries:

- Mushroom Music – Established in 2024
- I Oh You
- Illusive
- Reclusive Records – Established in June 2020
- Frontier Touring
- Love Police ATM
- Premier Artists
- Roundhouse
- Mushroom Marketing
- Mushroom Connect – Talent management and partnerships agency established in 2024
- Mushroom Creative House
- Mushroom Music Publishing
- Mushroom Booking Agency
- Mushroom Events
- Mushroom Pictures
- Good Neighbour – Rights operation

=== Former ===
- Liberation Records – Consolidated into Mushroom Music in 2024
- Ivy League Records – Established in 1997, consolidated into Mushroom Music in 2024
- Liberator Music – Consolidated into Mushroom Music in 2024
- Bloodlines – Consolidated into Mushroom Music in 2024
- Soothsayer – Consolidated into Mushroom Music in 2024
- 100s + 1000s – Established in 2020 and consolidated into Mushroom Music in 2024
- Mushroom Records – a former Mushroom Group subsidiary, then eventually a Warner Bros. Records label with a joint venture with Festival Records as Festival Mushroom Records.
