= The Temper Trap (album) =

2012 studio album by the Temper Trap

Studio album by The Temper Trap
- Released: 18 May 2012
- Recorded: 2010–11
- Studios: The Sound Factory, Los Angeles
- Genres: Indie rock, indie pop
- Labels: Liberation (AUS); Infectious (UK); Glassnote (US)
- Producers: Tony Hoffer, The Temper Trap, Russell Fawcus

The Temper Trap chronology
Conditions (2009)	The Temper Trap (2012)	Thick as Thieves (2016)

Singles from The Temper Trap
- 1. "Need Your Love" Released: 23 March 2012; 2. "Trembling Hands" Released: 9 May 2012; 3. "Miracle" Released: 26 October 2012

The Temper Trap is the second studio album by the Australian indie rock band of the same name, The Temper Trap, released in Australia through Liberation Music on 18 May 2012. A deluxe edition of the album was also released on iTunes Store, containing three bonus tracks: "Want", "The Trouble with Pain" and "Everybody Leaves in the End".

It is the band's first album as a five-piece since Joseph Greer was added as a permanent member of the band.

== Singles ==
- "Need Your Love" was released for streaming and purchase from digital outlets on 23 March 2012, being officially released on 7 May. A video was released for the song before its release date on 13 April 2012.
- "Trembling Hands" was announced as the second single from the album and it was released as a hype single, released the week before the album's release on 9 May 2012. A video was released for the song after its release date on 1 June 2012.
- "Miracle" was released as the third single.

== Reception ==
Professional ratings
Aggregate scores
Source	Rating
AnyDecentMusic?	5.4/10
Metacritic	(56/100)
Review scores
Source	Rating
AllMusic	4/5 stars
Consequence of Sound	2.5/5 stars
The Fly	3.5/5 stars
The Guardian	2/5 stars
Melodic.net	3.5/5 stars
NME	(5/10)
The Sun-Herald	4/5 stars

The Temper Trap received mixed reviews from critics. According to the website Metacritic, which assigns a weighted mean rating out of 100 to reviews from mainstream critics, the album received an average review score of 56/100, based on 13 reviews, which indicates "mixed or average reviews".

Matt Collar wrote a favorable review for AllMusic, stating "there's something less catchy about these tracks, but make no mistake, each song makes that wait well worth it, with a meticulous arrangement that pays off at exactly the right moment." Cameron Adams wrote a positive review for Herald Sun, analysing that "Unlike their debut Conditions, this album requires repeated listening and patience before it charms you. But in taking just enough risks while still serving up a safety net in that all-important hit, The Temper Trap should have effectively protected themselves from that dreaded second album syndrome."

A mixed review came from NME's Jamie Fullerton, who wrote that "this is a vision-free second album that sounds like a band who have nothing close to 'Sweet Disposition' in their arsenal. Instead of bashing critics away with brilliant tunes, they find themselves defining faceless bluster-rock." However he did comment that "The one great moment is the sweeping 'Trembling Hands', which is shaped enough like Keane's equally amazing 'Bedshaped' to hold the attention." Alexis Petridis of The Guardian wrote a negative review, saying that "for all Mandagi's pained sincerity – and he makes Chris Martin sound like a smirking ironist doing inverted commas with his fingers every other line – it all sounds weirdly hollow: music as a means to an end."

== Track listing ==
All songs written by The Temper Trap. All lyrics written by Dougy Mandagi.

No.	Title	Producer(s)	Length
1.	"Need Your Love"	Tony Hoffer	3:39
2.	"London's Burning"	Hoffer	4:07
3.	"Trembling Hands"	Hoffer	4:38
4.	"The Sea Is Calling"	Hoffer	3:45
5.	"Miracle"	Hoffer	3:44
6.	"This Isn't Happiness"	Hoffer	4:04
7.	"Where Do We Go from Here"	Hoffer	3:49
8.	"Never Again"	Hoffer	3:33
9.	"Dreams"	Hoffer	3:41
10.	"Rabbit Hole"	The Temper Trap, Russell Fawcus, Hoffer	3:06
11.	"I'm Gonna Wait"	Hoffer	4:15
12.	"Leaving Heartbreak Hotel"	Hoffer	4:26

Deluxe and iTunes deluxe bonus tracks
No.	Title	Producer(s)	Length
13.	"Want"	Hoffer	3:12
14.	"The Trouble with Pain"	Hoffer	4:23
15.	"Everybody Leaves in the End"	Hoffer	3:53

== Charts and certifications ==
=== Weekly charts ===
Chart (2012)	Peak position
Australian Albums (ARIA)	1
Belgian Albums (Ultratop Flanders)	71
Belgian Albums (Ultratop Wallonia)	65
Dutch Albums (Album Top 100)	50
German Albums (Offizielle Top 100)	70
Irish Albums (IRMA)	25
Italian Albums (FIMI)	78
New Zealand Albums (RMNZ)	25
Swiss Albums (Schweizer Hitparade)	53
UK Albums (Official Charts)	17
US Billboard 200	83
US Independent Albums (Billboard)	17

=== Year-end charts ===
Chart (2012)	Position
Australian Albums (ARIA)	33

=== Certifications ===
Region	Certification	Certified units/sales
Australia (ARIA)	Platinum	70,000^{^}
^{^} Shipments figures based on certification alone.

== Release history ==
Region	Date	Label
Australia/New Zealand/Germany	18 May 2012	Liberation
United Kingdom/Europe	21 May 2012	Infectious
United States/Canada/Mexico	5 June 2012	Glassnote
