= Need Your Love (The Temper Trap song) =

Single by The Temper Trap

from the album The Temper Trap
- Released: 23 March 2012
- Recorded: 2011
- Genre: Indie pop
- Length: 3:38
- Label: Liberation Music
- Songwriter(s): The Temper Trap
- Producer(s): Tony Hoffer

The Temper Trap singles chronology
"Love Lost" (2010)	"Need Your Love" (2012)	"Trembling Hands" (2012)

"Need Your Love" is the lead single from the Australian indie rock band The Temper Trap from their second studio album The Temper Trap. The single was released on 23 March 2012 in Australia as a digital download, and officially to charts on 7 May.

== Music video ==
A music video to accompany the release of "Need Your Love" was first released onto YouTube on 13 April 2012 at a total length of three minutes and forty-eight seconds. The video parodies the movie The Karate Kid, particularly the climatic final matchup at the end of the movie.

== Track listing ==
Digital download

1. "Need Your Love" – 3:38
2. "Rabbit Hole" – 3:05

== Chart performance ==
Chart (2012)	Peak Position
Australia (ARIA)	39
Japan Hot 100	56
UK Physical Singles Chart (Official Charts Company)	5
US Billboard Alternative Songs	38

== Release history ==
Country	Date	Format	Label
Australia	23 March 2012	Digital download	Liberation Music
