= Love Lost (song) =

Single by the Temper Trap

from the album Conditions
- Released: 6 February 2010
- Genre: Indie rock, indie pop
- Length: 3:36
- Label: Liberation (AUS); Infectious Records (UK); Glassnote Records (US)
- Songwriter: The Temper Trap
- Producer: Jim Abbiss

The Temper Trap singles chronology
"Fader" (2009)	"Love Lost" (2010)	"Need Your Love" (2012)

"Love Lost" is the fourth single from the Australian indie rock band the Temper Trap from their debut album Conditions. It reached number 32 on the Australian Singles Chart on 12 April 2010.

== Music video ==
The video was directed by Dougal Wilson and principal photography took place at Walthamstow Marshes in East London over the course of two days, with a scene notable for being under the Alliott Verdon Roe railway bridge arches. It premiered on April 12, 2009 in Australia and New Zealand on broadcast networks and was uploaded to YouTube on May 10, 2010. It begins on a rainy overcast day with a ferocious P.E. teacher in a harsh voice, ordering a class of prepubescent boys to run an endurance lap, with the boys synchronizing warm-up stretches that double as dance moves, jumping into puddles, are joined by a class of girls, then the boys set off firecrackers with synchronized arm sweeps then two boys do backflips.

== Track listing ==
Download

1. "Love Lost" - 3:35
2. "Love Lost" (Rollo & Sister Bliss mix) - 7:04

== Chart performance ==
Chart (2010)	Peak Position
Australia (ARIA)	32

== Certification ==
Region	Certification	Certified units/sales
New Zealand (RMNZ)	Gold	15,000^{‡}
^{‡} Sales+streaming figures based on certification alone.
