= Fader (song) =

Single by The Temper Trap

from the album Conditions
- Released: 4 July 2009
- Recorded: 2008
- Genre: Indie rock, post-punk revival
- Length: 3:12
- Label: Liberation (AUS); Infectious (UK)
- Songwriters: T. Dundas, A. Mandagi
- Producer: Jim Abbis

The Temper Trap singles chronology
| "Sweet Disposition" (2008) | "Fader" (2009) | "Love Lost" (2010) |

"Fader" is the third single by the Australian indie rock band The Temper Trap from their debut album Conditions.

The single was first released in Australia in July 2009, where it peaked at No. 85, marking the single highest and currently only placement in the Charts. It was also voted in at No. 21 in the 2009 Triple J Hottest 100.

The single was released digitally in the UK on 4 January 2010 where it peaked at number 76 on the UK Singles Chart later that week.

The song was featured in the 2010 Australian film Tomorrow, When the War Began and in the 2011 films The Roommate and Chalet Girl. The song was also featured in season 1 episode 6 of the hit US TV series The Vampire Diaries and in the video games MLB 11: The Show and Test Drive Unlimited 2.

A 15-second sample of the song plays whenever Southern Cross Austereo's stations go off-air, usually during ad breaks.

== Commercial performance ==
Despite being an Australian act, "Fader", the third single from Conditions only managed to reach a current peak of No. 47 in the Australian Singles Chart.

After the success of "Sweet Disposition" in the UK and Ireland, "Fader" has received increasing amount of radio coverage through December 2009 and January 2010, leading up to the single's release at the beginning of January 2010. With the album already released, the song has begun to receive pre-release downloads. Right across many Australian radio stations, Fader was added back to the playlist as a re-release in October 2010. Fader reached a new peak of No. 54 on 8 November 2010.

On 10 January 2010, "Fader" entered the UK Singles Chart at its peak of number 76.

== Track listing ==
CD single

1. "Fader"
2. "Little Boy"

iTunes version

1. "Fader"
2. "Fader" (Adam Freeland Mix)
3. "Fader" (Rockdaworld Vocal Extended Edit Mix)
4. "Fader" (Rockdaworld Superdub Extended Edit Mix)
5. "Fader" (Jakwob Mix)
6. "Fader" (Bangatang Mix)
7. "Fader" (Filed Under: K Mix)

== Charts ==
| Chart (2009–10) | Peak position |
|---|---|
| Australia (ARIA) | 47 |
| Scotland (OCC) | 55 |
| UK Singles (OCC) | 76 |
| UK Indie (OCC) | 6 |
| US Hot Rock & Alternative Songs (Billboard) | 25 |
| US Alternative Airplay (Billboard) | 16 |

== Certifications ==
| Region | Certification | Certified units/sales |
|---|---|---|
| New Zealand (RMNZ) | Gold | 15,000^{‡} |
^{‡} Sales+streaming figures based on certification alone.
