= Trembling Hands =

Single by The Temper Trap

from the album The Temper Trap
- Released: 9 May 2012
- Recorded: 2011
- Genre: Indie rock
- Length: 3:52 (single version); 4:39 (album version)
- Label: Liberation
- Songwriter(s): The Temper Trap
- Producer(s): Tony Hoffer

The Temper Trap singles chronology
"Need Your Love" (2012)	"Trembling Hands" (2012)	"Miracle" (2012)

"Trembling Hands" is a song written and performed by Australian indie rock band The Temper Trap. It is included as the third track on their eponymously titled second studio album. It was released as a hype single, released the week before the album's release as the second single on May 9, 2012. The hype factor of the single was increased when it was used in promos for episodes 12 and 13 for the third series of Offspring.

== Composition ==
With the chord progression of C-Gm7-Dm-Am, the song is written in the key of A phrygian.

== Track listing ==
Digital download
No.	Title	Length
1.	"Trembling Hands"	3:53

Digital Remix EP
No.	Title	Length
1.	"Trembling Hands"	4:39
2.	"Trembling Hands" (Benny Benassi Remix)	6:36
3.	"Trembling Hands" (Chet Faker Remix)	4:28
4.	"Trembling Hands" (Beni Remix)	5:48
5.	"Trembling Hands" (Benny Benassi Dub Remix)	6:05

== Chart performance ==
Chart (2012)	Peak position
Australia (ARIA)	38
UK Physical Singles Chart (Official Charts Company)	23

== Release history ==
Country	Date	Format	Label
Australia	9 May 2012	Digital download	Liberation
