= Sungazer (album) =

Studio album by the Temper Trap
- Released: 10 July 2026
- Length: 46:08
- Label: Mushroom
- Producers: Damir Askarov; Toby Dundas; Catherine Marks; Dougy Mandagi; Styalz Fuego

The Temper Trap chronology
| Thick as Thieves (2016) | Sungazer (2026) |

Singles from Sungazer
- 1. "Lucky Dimes" Released: 11 September 2025; 2. "Giving Up Air" Released: 25 September 2025; 3. "Into the Wild" Released: 26 February 2026; 4. "Sungazer" Released: 3 April 2026; 5. "These Arms" Released: 8 May 2026; 6. "Kuru" Released: 26 June 2026; 7. "Runaways" Released: 10 July 2026

Sungazer is the fourth studio album by the Australian indie-alternative rock band the Temper Trap. It was announced in April 2026, alongside the album's fourth and title track. Sungazer was released on 10 July 2026 via Mushroom Records.

The album comes after the band announced its hiatus in 2018. The group said, "With time apart and much personal growth from us all, Sungazer feels like it's captured the most pure collection of music we've ever made. We had more fun making this record and in the writing room than on any of the previous records we've done. We're in a great place creatively and in our friendships, we're closer than ever. Being back into the studio together really felt like coming home."

At the 2026 ARIA Music Awards, it was nominated for Best Rock Album.

== Reception ==
Professional ratings
Aggregate scores
| Source | Rating |
|---|---|
| Metacritic | 74/100 |
Review scores
| Source | Rating |
| AllMusic | 4/5 stars |
| Clash | 7/10 |
| Slant Magazine | 3/5 stars |

Al Newstead from Double J said "Sungazer recaptures the spark of the Melbourne/Naarm band's early days but offers new avenues into their brand of sensitive, stadium-baiting rock." Newstead name "Giving Up Air" as the "Stand-out".

Maddy Smith from Clash said "Returning from a lengthy 10-year hiatus, Sungazer is rife with trademark soulful falsetto, hazy guitars and lingering melancholy." Smith added "While it quietly sidesteps their former anthemic punch, Sungazer embraces a more intimate palette, cementing a cohesive, assured and delicately executed return."

Jon Negroni from Slant Magazine called it "A Reflective but Uneven Homecoming" adding "Mandagi's voice, though, remains an extraordinary instrument, and the songs on Sungazer are rawer, sharper and more honest than anything the band has released since 'Sweet Disposition'."

John Hastings from The 13th Floor said "Throughout the album, The Temper Trap continue to demonstrate that their greatest strength remains their ability to construct songs patiently, layering instrumentation and atmosphere until they reach moments of lift-off. The crescendos feel built but not manufactured. As electronic influences become more prominent, the emotional architecture remains unmistakably theirs."

== Track listing ==
All lyrics are written by Dougy Mandagi.

Sungazer track listing
| No. | Title | Music | Producer(s) | Length |
|---|---|---|---|---|
| 1. | "Lucky Dimes" | Toby Dundas; Dougy Mandagi; Kaelyn Behr | Styalz Fuego | 3:28 |
| 2. | "Into the Wild" | Jonathon Aherne; Dundas; Joseph Greer; Mandagi; Behr | Mandagi; Damir Askarov; Styalz Fuego | 3:41 |
| 3. | "These Arms" | Aherne; Dundas; Greer; Mandagi; Behr | Dundas; Styalz Fuego | 4:17 |
| 4. | "Bird on a Wire" | Mandagi; Malay | Mandagi; Askarov | 4:32 |
| 5. | "Giving Up Air" | Mandagi; Jono Ma | Styalz Fuego | 4:47 |
| 6. | "Sungazer" | Dundas; Mandagi; Behr | Styalz Fuego | 4:34 |
| 7. | "Lifeline" | Mandagi; Behr | Askarov; Styalz Fuego | 4:53 |
| 8. | "Runaways" | Aherne; Dundas; Greer; Mandagi; Behr | Catherine Marks; Styalz Fuego | 4:19 |
| 9. | "Halfway" | Aherne; Dundas; Greer; Mandagi | Dundas; Styalz Fuego | 2:54 |
| 10. | "Dystopia Radio" | Dundas; Greer; Mandagi | Dundas | 3:14 |
| 11. | "Kuru" | Aherne; Dundas; Greer; Mandagi | Dundas | 5:25 |
| Total length: | | | | 46:08 |

== Personnel ==
Credits are adapted from Tidal.

=== The Temper Trap ===
- Jonathon Aherne – bass
- Toby Dundas – drums
- Joseph Greer – guitar
- Dougy Mandagi – vocals, guitar

=== Additional contributors ===
- Spike Stent – mixing (tracks 1, 4)
- Catherine Marks – mixing (2, 8)
- Damir Askarov – mixing (3, 5–7, 9–11)

== Charts ==
Chart performance for Sungazer
| Chart (2026) | Peak position |
|---|---|
| Australian Albums (ARIA) | 9 |
| French Rock & Metal Albums (SNEP) | 76 |
| Scottish Albums (Official Charts) | 55 |
| UK Albums Sales (Official Charts) | 32 |
| UK Independent Albums (Official Charts) | 8 |
