= Conditions (album) =

Studio album by The Temper Trap
- Released: 19 June 2009
- Recorded: 2008–2009
- Genre: Indie rock, indie pop
- Length: 42:42
- Label: Liberation (AUS); Infectious (UK); Glassnote/Columbia (US)
- Producer: Jim Abbiss

The Temper Trap chronology
| The Temper Trap EP (2006) | Conditions (2009) | The Temper Trap (2012) |

Singles from Conditions
- 1. "Sweet Disposition" Released: 16 September 2008; 2. "Science of Fear" Released: 24 March 2009; 3. "Fader" Released: 4 July 2009; 4. "Love Lost" Released: 6 February 2010

Conditions is the debut studio album by Australian rock band The Temper Trap, released in Australia through Liberation Music on 19 June 2009. It was later released in the United Kingdom on 10 August 2009. The album debuted at number nine on the Australian Albums Chart, where it has been certified platinum, and peaked at number 25 on the UK Albums Chart, largely due to the success of the debut single "Sweet Disposition", which peaked at number six on the singles chart. The song "Science of Fear" was featured in the EA Sports video game FIFA 10 and the Codemasters racing game DiRT 2, while the song "Fader" was featured in the Eden Games racing game Test Drive Unlimited 2.

== Background ==
After signing a worldwide record deal with Korda Marshall's newly re-launched Infectious Records (previously home to Muse, Ash and Garbage) and scoring a trailer and soundtrack appearance for the US film 500 Days of Summer, Melbourne band The Temper Trap got together with producer Jim Abbiss (of Kasabian, Unkle, Arctic Monkeys, Adele) to work on their debut album in early 2009.

== Production ==
The album was completed in March 2009 in a final London Session with Abbiss, following a previous four-week stint at Melbourne's Sing Sing Studios with renowned Australian producer Kalju Tonuma who engineered the album.

== Reception ==
Professional ratings
Aggregate scores
| Source | Rating |
|---|---|
| AnyDecentMusic? | 6.1/10 |
| Metacritic | 71/100 |
Review scores
| Source | Rating |
| Allmusic | 3/5 stars |
| BBC | favourable |
| NME | 8/10 |
| OK! | 3/5 stars |
| Pitchfork Media | 4.6/10 |
| Sputnikmusic | 3.5/5 stars |
| The Sun-Herald | favourable |
| The Guardian | 4/5 stars |
| The Times | 4/5 stars |

Generally, early Australian reviews for the album were positive. Brisbane's Rave magazine gave the album high praise; "Some bands can only dream of a debut as auspicious as this. The Temper Trap have it for real".

In reference to Mandagi's voice, Michael Hann of The Guardian noted that; "with his voice, and a band this dynamic, he could get away with singing the racing cards", The Times online wrote that "the lead singer of this Melbourne four-piece, soars across a debut album with a voice that switches without warning into a rasping, edgy tenor with thrilling dynamic impact", whilst Keira Burgess of the BBC commented that; "Mandagi's falsetto vocal provides the axis around which the rest of the band revolves, displayed both in the often unintelligible 'Love Lost' through to the likes of sing-along synth pop 'Fader'".

However, not all reviews were positive, with music critic site Pitchfork Media deciding that the group is "defined by almost any measure except musical creativity or lyrical ingenuity", as well as noting that "when you adopt the trappings of revolutionary significance without showing much interest in advancing beyond the revolutions of twenty years ago, you sound ridiculous".

The album was nominated for the ARIA Album of the Year Award in 2009.

== Promotion and release ==
In Melbourne, coinciding with the launch of the album, the logo and title of the album were spray painted on pavements, including in Melbourne's central business district. Their debut album was released in Australia through Liberation Music on 19 June 2009. It was later released in the United Kingdom on 10 August 2009.

It was released in the United States on 13 October 2009, through Glassnote Records and Columbia Records.

== 10th Anniversary Edition ==
The 10th anniversary of Conditions was marked by a limited-edition vinyl and a tour in Australia.

On 9 August 2019, Conditions was reissued in a limited-edition white vinyl with a gatefold sleeve with commemorative imagery from the early days of the band's career.

A 3-date tour of Melbourne, Brisbane, and Sydney was announced, with a 4th date being added later. The tour is set to begin on 4 December 2019, and will feature special guests The Lazy Eyes, and Djirri Djirri.

== Track listing ==
Conditions (original release)
| No. | Title | Writer(s) | Length |
|---|---|---|---|
| 1. | "Love Lost" | Dougy Mandagi, Jonathon Aherne, Lorenzo Sillitto | 3:33 |
| 2. | "Rest" | Mandagi, Aherne, Sillitto, Dundas | 3:52 |
| 3. | "Sweet Disposition" | Mandagi, Sillitto | 3:54 |
| 4. | "Down River" | Mandagi, Aherne | 3:40 |
| 5. | "Soldier On" | Mandagi, Aherne, Sillitto | 5:55 |
| 6. | "Fader" | Mandagi, Dundas | 3:12 |
| 7. | "Fools" | Mandagi, Sillitto | 4:32 |
| 8. | "Resurrection" | Mandagi, Sillitto | 5:31 |
| 9. | "Science of Fear" | Mandagi, Sillitto, Dundas, Aherne | 4:17 |
| 10. | "Drum Song" | Mandagi, Sillitto, Aherne, Dundas | 3:20 |

All tracks are written by The Temper Trap.

Conditions (international release)
| No. | Title | Length |
|---|---|---|
| 1. | "Love Lost" | 3:33 |
| 2. | "Sweet Disposition" | 3:52 |
| 3. | "Fader" | 3:03 |
| 4. | "Rest" | 3:40 |
| 5. | "Down River" | 3:45 |
| 6. | "Soldier On" | 5:55 |
| 7. | "Fools" | 4:32 |
| 8. | "Resurrection" | 5:31 |
| 9. | "Science of Fear" | 4:17 |
| 10. | "Drum Song" | 3:20 |
| 11. | "Little Boy" (iTunes bonus track) | 3:51 |
| 12. | "Hearts" (iTunes bonus track) | 2:45 |

Conditions Remixed
| No. | Title | Length |
|---|---|---|
| 1. | "Love Lost" (Rollo & Sister Bliss Remix) |
| 2. | "Rest" (Three Trapped Tigers Remix) |
| 3. | "Sweet Disposition" (Alan Wilkis Remix) |
| 4. | "Down River" (Fool's Gold Remix) |
| 5. | "Soldier On" (RUSKOS F'kin Seagull Remix) |
| 6. | "Fader" (Adam Freeland Remix) |
| 7. | "Fools" (Peter, Bjorn & John Hortlax Cobra Remix) |
| 8. | "Resurrection" (Penguin Prison Remix) |
| 9. | "Science of Fear" (The Count (aka Hervé) 'Medusa' Remix) |
| 10. | "Drum Song" (bretonLABS remix featuring Kate Tempest) |

== Charts ==
=== Weekly charts ===
| Chart (2009–2010) | Peak position |
|---|---|
| Australian Albums (ARIA) | 9 |
| Belgian Albums (Ultratop Flanders) | 66 |
| Dutch Albums (Album Top 100) | 63 |
| French Albums (SNEP) | 173 |
| Irish Albums (IRMA) | 18 |
| Italian Albums (FIMI) | 53 |
| UK Albums (Official Charts) | 25 |
| US Billboard 200 | 175 |
| US Top Rock Albums (Billboard) | 50 |

=== Year-end charts ===
| Chart (2009) | Position |
|---|---|
| Australian Albums (ARIA) | 89 |
| UK Albums (OCC) | 172 |
| Chart (2010) | Position |
| Australian Albums (ARIA) | 28 |
| UK Albums (OCC) | 130 |

== Certifications ==
| Region | Certification | Certified units/sales |
|---|---|---|
| Australia (ARIA) | Platinum | 70,000^{^} |
| New Zealand (RMNZ) | Platinum | 15,000^{‡} |
| United Kingdom (BPI) | Gold | 100,000^{^} |
^{^} Shipments figures based on certification alone.^{‡} Sales+streaming figures based on certification alone.

== Release history ==
| Region | Date | Label | Format | Catalogue |
|---|---|---|---|---|
| Australia | 19 June 2009 | Liberation | CD, digital download | |
| Australia | 19 June 2009 | Liberation | CD | LMCD0056 |
| United Kingdom | 10 August 2009 | Infectious | CD | |
| United States | 13 October 2009 | Glassnote | | |
