= Fall Together =

2016 song by The Temper Trap

"Fall Together" is a song written and performed by Australian indie rock band The Temper Trap. It is included as the fifth track on their third studio album Thick as Thieves. It was released on 12 April 2016.

== Chart performance ==
Chart (2016)	Peak position
Australia (ARIA)	50
Belgium (Ultratip Bubbling Under Wallonia)	25
