= Liberator Music =

Australian record label

- Parent company: Mushroom Group
- Founded: 2006
- Founder: Nick Dunshea; Michael Gudinski
- Defunct: 2024
- Distributor: Universal Music Australia
- Genre: Various
- Country of origin: Australia
- Location: Melbourne, Australia
- Official website: liberatormusic.com.au

Liberator Music was a record label owned by the Mushroom Group. It was founded in 2006 by Nick Dunshea and Michael Gudinski in Melbourne. The label was the international recording division of the company and is home to artists such as Childish Gambino, CHVRCHES, alt-J, Andy Grammer, FIDLAR, Steve Aoki, Garbage, AJR, We The Kings, Wolf Alice, Kylie Minogue, Gengahr, Faith No More, Day Wave, Totally Enormous Extinct Dinosaurs, Fontaines D.C., and IDLES.

Liberator Music was merged into Mushroom Music in 2024.

== History ==
Liberator Music was founded in March 2006 by ex-Shock Records employee, Nick Dunshea, and Mushroom Group founder & chairman, Michael Gudinski as the international recording division of the Mushroom Group.

Liberator Music went on to set up joint ventures and distribution deals with international labels such as [PIAS], Glassnote Records, Infectious Music, S-Curve, Norman Cook's Southern Fried Records, Partisan Records, as well as direct artist signings (for Australia & New Zealand) such as CHVRCHES, Garbage, Dizzee Rascal, Kaiser Chiefs and Childish Gambino

As part of a restructure of the Mushroom Group in July 2024, Liberator Music and other labels were consolidated into a new division called Mushroom Music.

=== [PIAS] joint venture ===
In 2007, the company entered into a 50/50 joint venture deal with European record company, [PIAS]. In early 2013, [PIAS] acquired Cooperative Music (and the Coop-owned V2 Records label) from Universal Music Group, forming the new business division [PIAS] Cooperative thus giving Liberator Music the exclusive rights to the catalogue in Australia & New Zealand. After almost 10 years, [PIAS] and Liberator Music's partnership came to an end on 23 January 2017 when [PIAS] acquired Australian record label, Inertia Music.

=== The return of Garbage to Mushroom ===
Garbage had originally signed to Gudinski's Mushroom Records for the release of their debut single, "Vow" in 1995, and subsequent albums. In 2003, Mushroom Records was sold to Warner Music and absorbed by the label East West, which was headed up by former Mushroom Records executive, Korda Marshall. With the sale, Warner Music also gained the rights to Garbage's catalogue. On 18 November 2011, after an "indefinite hiatus", the band tweeted that they had "Just signed in Australia with Liberator Music. Our career started in Oz. Twenty years on we are still loving Michael Gudinski." With this deal, Liberator Music took control of the band's catalogue, as well as future recordings. The first album of new material released via Liberator Music was Not Your Kind Of People.

=== Childish Gambino ===
On 15 November 2011, Liberator Music released Childish Gambino's debut album Camp. This was the start of a long-standing and successful collaboration between Liberator Music and Childish Gambino. Childish Gambino released his second album, because the internet on 10 December 2013, once again via Liberator Music in Australia/New Zealand. On 2 October, he released a mixtape titled STN MTN and the following day an EP titled Kauai. 2 December 2016 saw the release of "Awaken, My Love!".
