= Sweet Disposition =

2008 single by the Temper Trap

Single by the Temper Trap

from the album Conditions
- B-side: "Science of Fear"; "Little Boy"
- Released: 16 September 2008
- Genre: Indie rock
- Length: 3:52
- Label: Liberation (Australia); Infectious (UK); Columbia (US)
- Songwriters: Dougy Mandagi; Lorenzo Sillitto
- Producer: Jim Abbiss

The Temper Trap singles chronology
| "Sweet Disposition" (2008) | "Fader" (2010) |

Music video
- "Sweet Disposition" on YouTube

"Sweet Disposition" is a song by Australian indie rock band the Temper Trap. Described by critics as an "indie anthem", the song was written by Dougy Mandagi and Lorenzo Sillitto. "Sweet Disposition" peaked at number 14 on the ARIA Singles Chart. Outside Australia, "Sweet Disposition" peaked within the top ten of the charts in Belgium (Flanders), Ireland, and the United Kingdom. Renewed interest in the song was generated after it was included in the soundtrack for the 2009 film 500 Days of Summer—eventually peaking at number nine on the Billboard Alternative Songs chart in the United States. In 2025 the song was voted 11th in the Triple J Hottest 100 of Australian Songs.

== Chart performance and sales ==
Despite the Temper Trap originating from Australia, "Sweet Disposition", the lead single from the debut album Conditions, proved to be more popular in the United Kingdom and Ireland, reaching No. 6 (in the week beginning 11 October 2009) and No. 8, respectively, while it only reached a peak of No. 14 in Australia. However, it was eventually certified 3× Platinum in Australia for sales exceeding 210,000 copies, becoming the band's highest-selling single in their home country.

The song reached No. 9 on Billboard's Alternative Songs chart due to interest in the song after it appeared in the film 500 Days of Summer. In 2014, it was featured in the action film 3 Days to Kill starring Kevin Costner. In 2023, it was used in promotional trailers for the final instalment of The Crown. A dance remix made by Axwell and Dirty South of this song reached No. 1 on Billboard's Hot Dance Airplay chart in April 2010. It received a Platinum certification from the RIAA in 2013 for more than 1,000,000 copies sold.

The single was certified Gold by the Federation of the Italian Music Industry and 4× Platinum in the United Kingdom by the British Phonographic Industry.

== Music videos ==
There are three music videos for the song. The Australian/domestic version, directed by Madeline Griffith, features the band performing alongside slow motion footage of light bulbs smashing on the floor.

The UK/international version directed by Barnaby Roper, begins with a gradual descent towards the lights on a runway before featuring a girl roller blading through space, past transparent images of each band member. That version was also played in Australia following the song's increase in popularity in 2010.

The US version, directed by Daniel Eskils, was released in March 2010. This version displays the band members playing around with musical instruments as well as demolishing them, this all being taped with a high-speed camera.

As of 2026, the most popular music video has around 90 million views, whereas the other two versions both have around 15 million views each.

== Track listings ==
Australian digital download

1. "Sweet Disposition" – 3:54
2. "Sweet Disposition" (video) – 3:54

Australian CD single

1. "Sweet Disposition"
2. "Sweet Disposition" (Curtis Vodka remix)

Australian 12-inch single

A1. "Sweet Disposition"
A2. "Sweet Disposition" (Curtis Vodka remix)
B1. "Science of Fear"
B2. "Science of Fear" (Pocketknife remix)

UK 7-inch picture disc single

A. "Sweet Disposition"
B. "Little Boy"

== Charts ==
=== Weekly charts ===
Weekly chart performance for "Sweet Disposition"
| Chart (2009–2012) | Peak position |
|---|---|
| Australia (ARIA) | 14 |
| Belgium (Ultratop 50 Flanders) | 6 |
| Belgium (Ultratip Bubbling Under Wallonia) | 13 |
| Ireland (IRMA) | 8 |
| Italy Airplay (EarOne) | 2 |
| Netherlands (Dutch Top 40) | 32 |
| Netherlands (Single Top 100) | 54 |
| New Zealand (Recorded Music NZ) | 34 |
| Scottish Singles Sales (Official Charts) | 6 |
| UK Singles (Official Charts) | 6 |
| UK Indie (Official Charts) | 1 |
| US Bubbling Under Hot 100 (Billboard) | 8 |
| US Dance Club Songs (Billboard) | 3 |
| US Dance Airplay (Billboard) | 1 |
| US Hot Rock & Alternative Songs (Billboard) | 17 |

Chart performance for "What If You Fly (Sweet Disposition)" (Bunt & The Temper Trap Version)
| Chart (2026) | Peak position |
|---|---|
| Lithuania Airplay (TopHit) | 84 |

=== Year-end charts ===
Year-end chart performance for "Sweet Disposition"
| Chart (2009) | Position |
|---|---|
| Australian Artist Singles (ARIA) | 34 |
| UK Singles (OCC) | 78 |

| Chart (2010) | Position |
|---|---|
| Australia (ARIA) | 56 |
| Australian Artist Singles (ARIA) | 5 |
| Belgium (Ultratop 50 Flanders) | 65 |
| Italy Airplay (EarOne) | 19 |
| Italy Download (FIMI) | 55 |
| UK Singles (OCC) | 150 |
| US Dance Airplay (Billboard) | 5 |
| US Dance Club Songs (Billboard) | 43 |
| US Rock Songs (Billboard) | 45 |

== Certifications ==
| Region | Certification | Certified units/sales |
|---|---|---|
| Australia (ARIA) | 8× Platinum | 560,000^{‡} |
| Denmark (IFPI Danmark) | Gold | 45,000^{‡} |
| Italy (FIMI) | Gold | 25,000^{‡} |
| New Zealand (RMNZ) | 5× Platinum | 150,000^{‡} |
| United Kingdom (BPI) | 4× Platinum | 2,400,000^{‡} |
| United States (RIAA) | Platinum | 1,000,000^{*} |
^{*} Sales figures based on certification alone.^{‡} Sales+streaming figures based on certification alone.

== Release history ==
| Region | Date | Format(s) | Label | Ref. |
|---|---|---|---|---|
| Australia | 16 September 2008 | Digital download | Liberation | |
| Australia | 22 October 2008 | 12-inch vinyl | Liberation | |
| Australia | 26 January 2009 | CD single | Liberation | |
| United States | 14 July 2009 | Digital download | Glassnote | |
| United Kingdom | 2 August 2009 | Digital download | Infectious | |
| United Kingdom | 3 August 2009 | 7-inch vinyl | Infectious | |
| United States | 31 August 2009 | Alternative radio | Liberation; Glassnote | |
| United Kingdom | 11 October 2009 | Digital download (remixes) | Infectious | |
| United States | 24 August 2010 | Digital download (remixes) | Glassnote | |

== "Sweet Disposition (A Moment, a Love)" ==
"Sweet Disposition (A Moment, a Love)"

Single by Lost Frequencies and The Temper Trap
- Released: 30 May 2025
- Length: 3:32
- Label: Lost & Cie
- Songwriters: Felix De Laet; Dougy Mandagi; Lorenzo Sillitto
- Producer: Lost Frequencies

Lost Frequencies singles chronology
| "Dance in the Sunlight" (2025) | "Sweet Disposition (A Moment, a Love)" (2025) | "Summer Skies (Love to Cry)" (2025) |

The Temper Trap singles chronology
| "Under the Milky Way" (2023) | "Sweet Disposition (A Moment, a Love)" (2025) | "Lucky Dimes" (2025) |

On 30 May 2025, a version titled "Sweet Disposition (A Moment, a Love)" credited to Belgium DJ Lost Frequencies and The Temper Trap was released.

=== Reception ===
Freddy Pawle from Rolling Stone Australia said "De Laet's remix features bouncy echoes of the original chorus atop a trance-inducing beat built for both mainstream and underground fans to sing along to."

=== Charts ===
Chart performance for "Sweet Disposition (A Moment, a Love)" (Lost Frequencies & The Temper Trap Version)
| Chart (2025) | Peak position |
|---|---|
| Belgium (Ultratop 50 Flanders) | 6 |
| Belgium (Ultratop 50 Wallonia) | 16 |
| NZ Hot Singles (RMNZ) | 39 |
| North Macedonia Airplay (Radiomonitor) | 12 |

2025 year-end chart performance for "Sweet Disposition (A Moment, a Love)" (Lost Frequencies & The Temper Trap Version)
| Chart (2025) | Position |
|---|---|
| Belgium (Ultratop 50 Flanders) | 32 |
| Belgium (Ultratop 50 Wallonia) | 117 |
| Lithuania Airplay (TopHit) | 102 |

== In popular culture ==
=== Film ===
- The song was featured on the soundtrack for the 2009 romantic comedy 500 Days of Summer.
- The song was featured on the soundtrack and played during the ending scene for the 2014 action thriller film, 3 Days to Kill.
- The song was featured on the soundtrack for the 2020 romantic film, I Still Believe.

=== Advertisements ===
- The song was used in the 2009 "Memories Start Here" advert for Center Parcs.
- The song was used in a 2009 Sky Sports advert featuring Jose Mourinho.
- The song was used in a 2009 of Network 10 AFL Finals Series advert.
- The song was used in a 2009 O2 advert.
- The song was used in a 2010 Indonesian advert promoting the Toyota Yaris.
- The song was used in a long-form commercial for Chrysler released in 2010.
- The song was used in a commercial for Diet Coke that reportedly aired on the 2010 Academy Awards.
- Coca-Cola Company used the song again for its Coke Zero drink in 2025.
- The song was used in a 2010 commercial for Rhapsody Music service.
- A cover of the song was used in a 2024 Nissan X-Trail e-POWER hybrid electric vehicle ad.

=== Video games ===
- The song was featured on the soundtrack for the 2010 video game, Pro Evolution Soccer 2011.

=== Other ===
- The song was used in a farewell tribute video by WWE for John Cena ahead of his retirement, featuring several WWE superstars and production crew.

== See also ==
- List of number-one dance airplay hits of 2010 (U.S.)
