= The Temper Trap =

Australian indie rock band

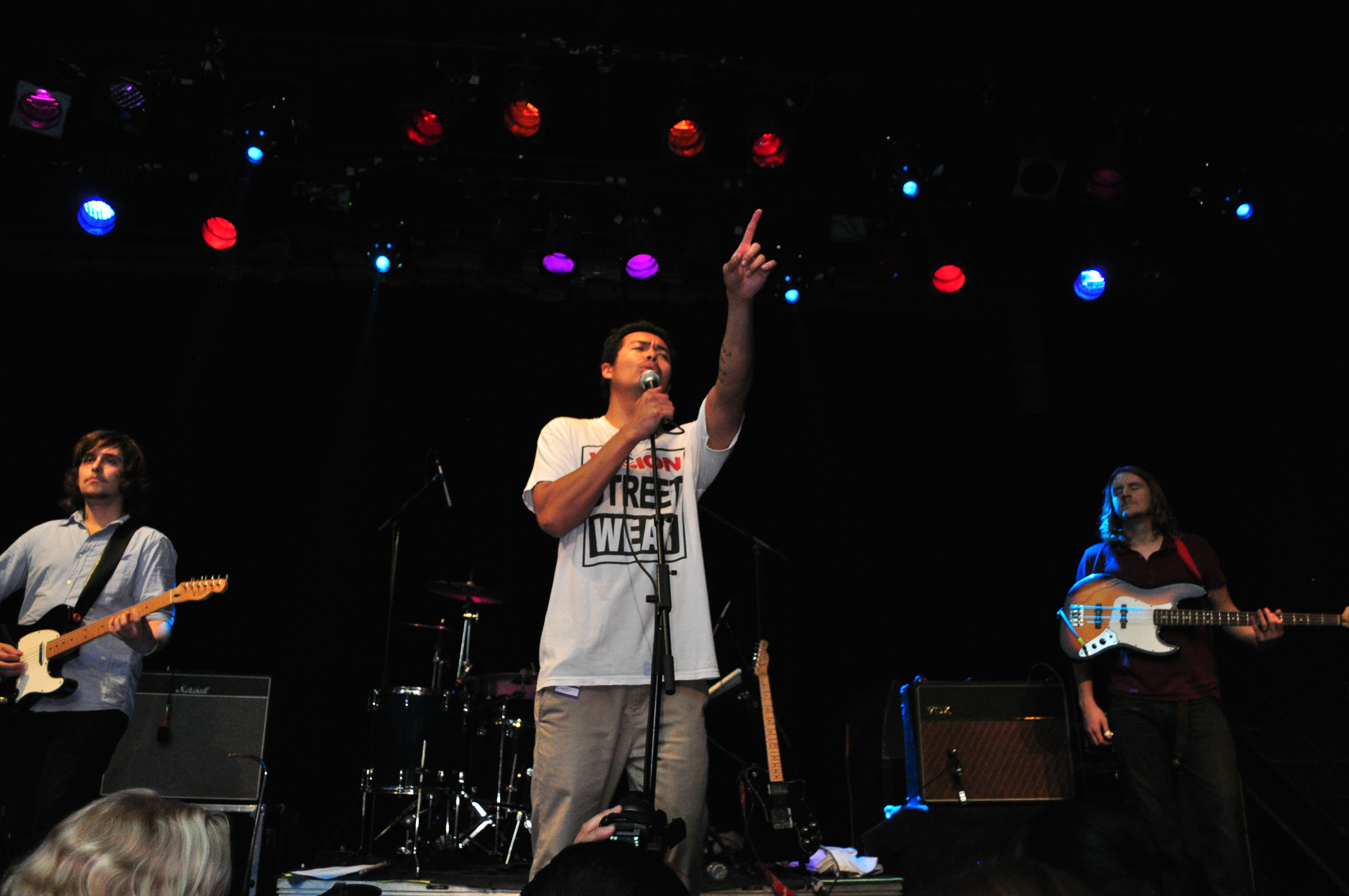
- Left to right: Lorenzo Sillitto, Dougy Mandagi, Jonathon Aherne, Toby Dundas in 2009

Background information
- Origin: Melbourne, Victoria, Australia
- Genres: Indie rock; alternative rock
- Years active: 2005–2019, 2022–present
- Labels: Liberation; Infectious; Glassnote
- Members: Dougy Mandagi; Jonathon Aherne; Toby Dundas; Joseph Greer
- Past members: Lorenzo Sillitto
- Website: thetempertrap.com

The Temper Trap are an Australian indie rock band formed in 2005 by Dougy Mandagi, Jonathon Aherne, and Toby Dundas. In 2008, the group relocated from Melbourne to London. The band released their debut album Conditions in June 2009 to favourable reviews and commercial success; it peaked at No. 9 on the ARIA Albums Chart and into the top 30 on the UK Albums Chart. Its lead single, "Sweet Disposition", peaked in the top 10 on the Belgian, Irish and UK Singles Charts and reached No. 14 on the ARIA Singles Chart. At the ARIA Music Awards of 2010 in November, The Temper Trap won Best Group and Most Popular Australian Single for "Sweet Disposition". Their eponymous second album was released in late May/early June 2012 under Liberation Music (AUS), Infectious Records (UK) and Glassnote Records (US). The album won the band Best Rock Album, and they also won Best Group at the 2012 ARIA Awards. In October 2013, guitarist Lorenzo Sillitto left the band during the recording of the third album. He was not replaced, converting the band back into a quartet.

== History ==
=== 2005–2007: Formation and The Temper Trap EP ===
The Temper Trap formed as an indie pop band in 2005. Indonesian-born Mandagi, who is originally from Manado and a grand-nephew of Arie Frederik Lasut, was a busker in Melbourne, Australia, in 1999 when he met Aherne, who wanted to learn to play guitar. Six years later, Mandagi met Dundas while the pair worked in a clothing store. In 2005, the three friends decided to form a band, with Mandagi on vocals and guitars, and Dundas on drums, while Aherne was later convinced to join on bass guitar by Mandagi. The group was named "The Temper Trap" after Temper Temper, the trio's first choice, was rejected due to its use by a United States (US) band. The Temper Trap rehearsed with a variety of second guitarists before Dundas recommended his former Geelong Grammar schoolmate, Sillitto, on lead guitar. The group performed at St Jerome's Laneway Festival in March 2006.

The group signed to Michael Gudinski's label, Liberation Music, and released its debut extended play (EP), The Temper Trap, in November 2006 through the label; the EP was produced by Scott Horscroft (The Sleepy Jackson, Silverchair). According to a live review by "planetclare" of Australian music website FasterLouder, Dundas sometimes abandons the drums and plays guitar, while Mandagi's voice "hits a note and then transcends it, slicing the sound barrier and leaving you with your mouth open and your eyes wide". The review also described Aherne regularly moving around the stage and Sillitto providing guitar solos that "subtlety drove the melody from the side of stage". After finishing an Australian tour, the band then performed at the V Festival in Melbourne, Sydney (March 2007) and the Gold Coast (April).

=== 2008–2011: Conditions ===
In late 2008, The Temper Trap started recording their debut album, Conditions, in Melbourne with engineering by record producer Kalju Tonuma. They travelled to the UK and attracted the attention of the local music industry after playing at the Musexpo in London in October. By January 2009, the band had signed to Infectious Records for European releases. The BBC chose The Temper Trap in its top 15 Sound of 2009 list. In March, the band finished recording Conditions in London with UK music producer Jim Abbiss. Mandagi said his key influences when recording it had included Radiohead, Prince, Massive Attack and U2. In May, after performing at South by Southwest in March, they signed to Glassnote Records for US releases. The album was released in Australia on 19 June and debuted at No. 9 on the Australian ARIA Albums Chart. It was released in the UK in August. The band had returned to London in early May to "spend a bit of time on the continent and try and build a fan base over here", according to Sillitto. He says "it was always our dream to at least come over here and give it a good crack early on".

The album's lead single, "Sweet Disposition", was released in Australia in October 2008. It was re-recorded with Abbiss and re-issued in June 2009. This version peaked in the top 10 on the Belgian, Irish and UK Singles Charts and reached No. 14 on the ARIA Singles Chart. The group played shows in Europe with Silversun Pickups and garnered attention from newfound fans and media. In August, they played the Reading and Leeds Festivals. In September, the band embarked on their first headlining UK tour, including Hare and Hounds in Birmingham and the 300-capacity Arts Centre in Norwich. The tour started and finished in Brighton, with the Goldhawks as their support act.

In August, The Temper Trap played on a balcony over London's Camden Lock to promote the release of their next single "Science of Fear" on the online viral music show BalconyTV. In late November, the group cancelled sold-out show dates in Germany to return to Australia to perform at the ARIA Awards. They received four nominations in the categories Album of the Year, Breakthrough Album of the Year and Best Rock Album for Conditions, and Single of the Year for "Sweet Disposition".

During 2010, the group toured the UK as well as appearing at several music festivals such as Oxegen, Glastonbury, Rock Werchter, Roskilde Festival, V Festival as well as Big Day Out and Splendour in the Grass in Australia. In the US, the band embarked on their first headlining tour, with the single "Sweet Disposition" receiving significant airplay and appearances in commercials and television shows. At the APRA Awards of 2010, Mandagi and Sillitto received the Song of the Year award for writing "Sweet Disposition". They followed with a comeback tour of Australia in July, playing to crowds of over 5000 people, their second largest to date with the largest being Mexico City's Corona Fest in October. At the ARIA Music Awards of 2010 in November, The Temper Trap won two awards: Best Group and Most Popular Australian Single for "Sweet Disposition". In February 2011, the group was nominated for a BRIT Award in the Best International Breakthrough Artist category.

=== 2012–2015: The Temper Trap ===
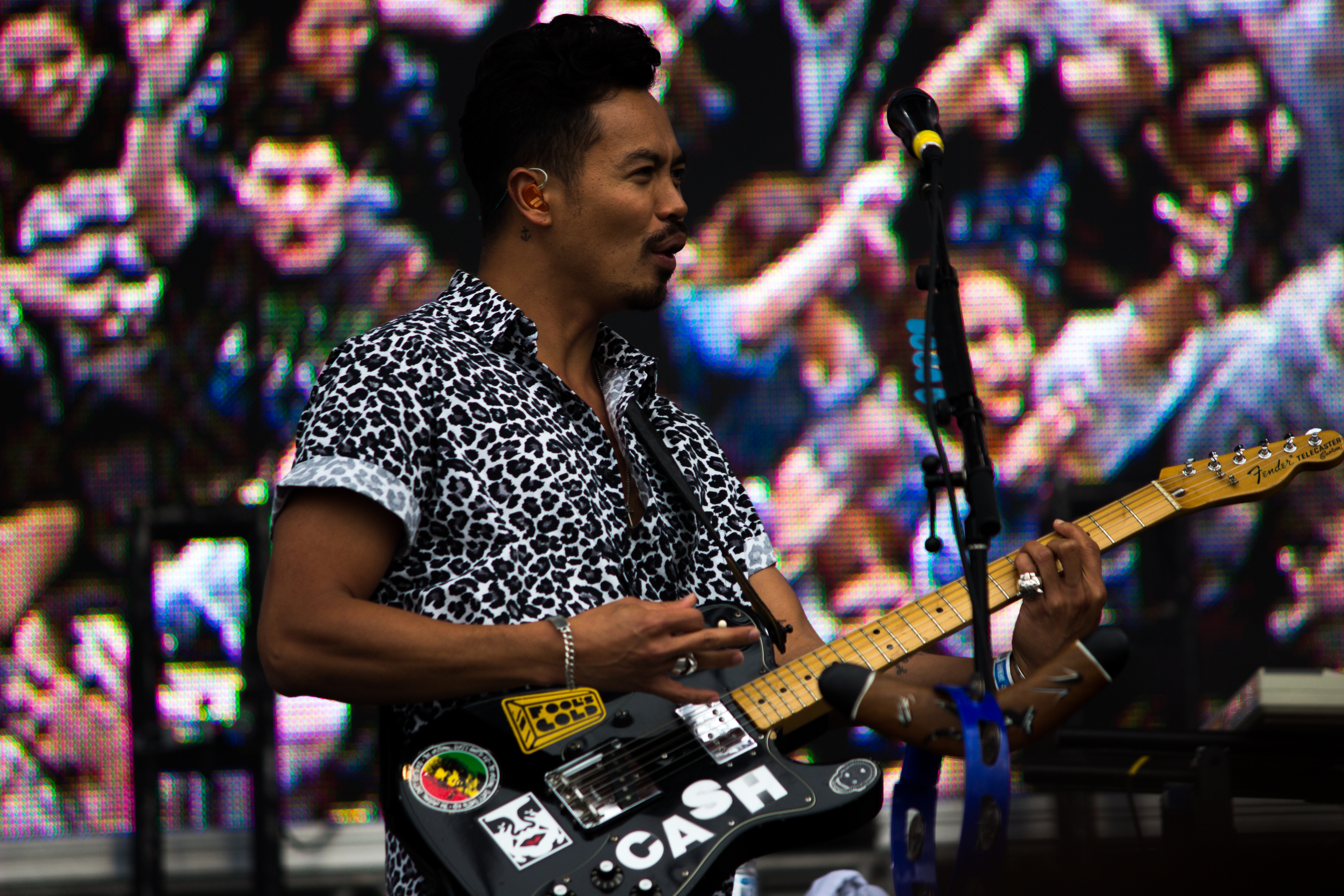
Dougy Mandagi of the Temper Trap at Lollapalooza Chile 2013

In March 2012 the band performed a short run of sold-out shows in North America. They also completed extensive tours in 2012 in the UK, North America and Australia, as well as numerous festival appearances. On 13 April 2012, they released the official video for the single, "Need Your Love", directed by Dugan O'Neal (O'Neal released the video on his personal Vimeo channel in the previous week). It features a Karate Kid-like mini-film, with short appearances by the band members as the general public. Shortly after its release, a behind-the-scenes video followed.

The Temper Trap released their self-titled second album on 18 May (Australia/NZ/Germany), 21 May (UK/Europe) and 5 June (US/Canada/Mexico) 2012. On 7 March, they released a new song titled "Rabbit Hole". The first single, "Need Your Love". was released on 23 March 2012. On 1 June, the video for "Trembling Hands" was released online. The Tom Haines-directed video tells the tale of a young trapeze artist discovering herself through the emotions and risks involved with her discipline. Dougy Mandagi is the only member of the band to appear in the video, which shot on location in Cuba. "Trembling Hands" was officially released as a single in May 2012, which was followed by a remix EP in July. The remix EP features mixes by Benny Benassi, Chet Faker and Beni.

On 6 August 2012, the Temper Trap played a live streaming concert for YouTube Presents before a select group of fans in New York City, USA. The concert consisted of six songs: three from the album Conditions and three from the self-titled album. They played as one of the opening acts for Coldplay during the Australia/New Zealand leg of their Mylo Xyloto Tour in November and December 2012. On 6 July 2013, they supported The Rolling Stones at Hyde Park in Sydney, Australia, alongside American musician Gary Clark Jr.

In November 2012, The Temper Trap won the Best Rock Album award for their eponymous second album and the Best Group award at the 2012 ARIA Awards. In January 2013, "Trembling Hands" was voted into the number 22 position as part of Triple J's Hottest 100 countdown. A June 2013 media article revealed that the band were continuing to work on their third studio album. In October 2013, an official statement confirmed that lead guitarist Lorenzo Sillitto parted ways with the band. Since then the band have continued to play live while working on their third album with Damian Taylor.

In September 2012, The Temper Trap played in front of approximately 100,000 AFL fans at half time of the AFL Grand Final between Sydney and Hawthorn.

=== 2016–2019: Thick as Thieves to hiatus ===
The title track from the band's third studio album, Thick as Thieves. was released as its lead single in February and peaked at number 92 in Australia. On 11 April 2016, the band released the second single, "Fall Together", the same day the album was officially announced on their Facebook page. The album was released on 10 June 2016, marking their first release in four years.

In May 2018, The Temper Trap supported American rock band Imagine Dragons on the Australian and New Zealand legs of their Evolve World Tour. This included performances in Perth, Melbourne, Brisbane, Sydney, Auckland, and Wellington.

The group went on hiatus in 2019, following a 10-year anniversary tour for Conditions in Australia.

=== 2018–present: Sungazer ===
The band's activity was minimal for several years, with Mandagi focusing on his solo project Bloodmoon and other band members focusing on their families. In 2022, the band played their first run of shows in three years as main support for Kings of Leon. They would then play small, sporadic runs of headlining shows and festival dates across 2023 and 2024.

In September 2025, after several teases on social media, the band released the single "Lucky Dimes", their first solo material in nine years. In April 2026, the group announced their fourth studio album Sungazer, which was released on 10 July 2026. Following the release of their album, the band announced they would be joining fellow bands Muse and Bloc Party on tour in the United States.

== Members ==
Current members

- Dougy Mandagi – lead vocals, rhythm guitar, percussion (2005–present); keyboards (2005–2008)
- Toby Dundas – drums, occasional rhythm guitar, backing vocals (2005–present)
- Jonathon Aherne – bass, percussion, backing vocals (2005–present)
- Joseph Greer – keyboards, backing vocals (2008–present), lead guitar (2013–present), rhythm guitar (2008–2013)

Former members

- Lorenzo Sillitto – lead guitar, backing vocals (2005–2013)

Timeline

== Discography ==
=== Studio albums ===
- Conditions (2009)
- The Temper Trap (2012)
- Thick as Thieves (2016)
- Sungazer (2026)

== Awards and nominations ==
=== AIR Awards ===
The Australian Independent Record Awards (commonly known informally as AIR Awards) is an annual awards night to recognise, promote and celebrate the success of Australia's Independent Music sector.

Year	Nominee / work	Award	Result	Ref.
2010	"Love Lost"	Best Independent Single/EP	Nominated	
2010	The Temper Trap	Most Popular Independent Artist (As Voted by Nova Listeners)	Nominated	
2012	Temper Trap	Best Independent Album	Nominated	

=== APRA Awards ===
The APRA Awards are presented annually from 1982 by the Australasian Performing Right Association (APRA), "honouring composers and songwriters". They commenced in 1982.

Year	Nominee / work	Award	Result	Ref.
2010	"Sweet Disposition" (Abby Mandagi, Lorenzo Sillitto)	Song of the Year	Won	
2010	The Temper Trap (Jonathon Aherne, Tobias Dundas, Abby Mandagi, Lorenzo Sillitto)	Breakthrough Songwriter of the Year	Nominated	
2013	"Trembling Hands" (Tobias Dundas, Joseph Greer, Abby Mandagi and Lorenzo Sillitto)	Song of the Year	Shortlisted	

=== ARIA Music Awards ===
The ARIA Music Awards is an annual awards ceremony that recognises excellence, innovation, and achievement across all genres of Australian music.

Year	Nominee / work	Award	Result	Ref.
2009	Conditions	Album of the Year	Nominated	
2009	Conditions	Breakthrough Artist - Album	Nominated	
2009	Conditions	Best Rock Album	Nominated	
2009	"Sweet Disposition"	Single of the Year	Nominated	
2010	Conditions	Best Group	Won	
2010	Conditions	Most Popular Australian Album	Nominated	
2010	"Sweet Disposition"	Most Popular Australian Single	Won	
2010	The Temper Trap	Most Popular Australian Artist	Nominated	
2010	"Love Lost"	Single of the Year	Nominated	
2012	Temper Trap	Album of the Year	Nominated	
2012	Temper Trap	Best Rock Album	Won	
2012	Temper Trap	Best Group	Won	
2016	Thick As Thieves	Best Adult Alternative Album	Nominated	
2026	Sungazer	Best Rock Album	Nominated	

=== EG Awards / Music Victoria Awards ===
The EG Awards (known as Music Victoria Awards since 2013) are an annual awards night celebrating Victorian music. They commenced in 2006.

Year	Nominee / work	Award	Result	Ref.
2009	The Temper Trap	Best Band	Unknown	
2009	Conditions	Best Album	Unknown	
2012	The Temper Trap	Best Band	Won	
