= Liberation Music =

Australian record label

Liberation Records
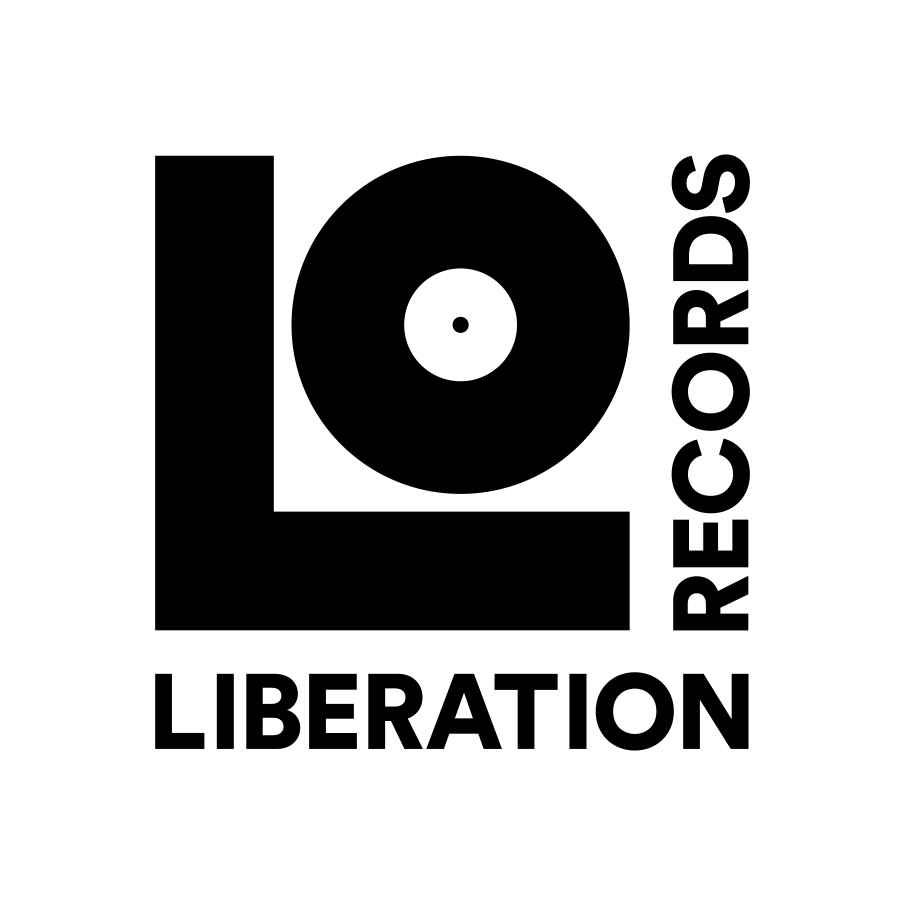
- Parent company: Mushroom Group
- Founded: 1999
- Founder: Michael Gudinski; Warren Costello
- Defunct: 2024
- Status: Defunct
- Distributor(s): Warner Music Australia (1999–2008); Universal Music Australia (2008–present)
- Genre: Various
- Country of origin: Australia
- Location: Melbourne, Victoria
- Official website: liberationrecords.com.au

Liberation Records, formerly Liberation Music, was an Australian record company and label, started in 1999 by Michael Gudinski and Warren Costello, based in Melbourne. Its stated business aim is to "find, nurture and then to develop new talent for a world market while remaining independent in the process".

Liberation has a sub-label called Liberator Music, which is a distributor for foreign artists and labels such as Childish Gambino, Glassnote Records, BMG Rights Management, and Ipecac Recordings.

Liberation Records was merged into Mushroom Music in 2024.

== History ==
Following the 1998 sale of Gudinski's Mushroom Records to Festival Records, Liberation Music was formed to continue to satisfy Michael Gudinski's desire to promote and develop Australian Music. Effective September 2006, Liberation is distributed by Universal Music Australia after leaving Warner Music Australia.

In September 2017, Liberation Music rebranded as Liberation Records. The Mushroom Group's newer imprint, Bloodlines, became home to several artists previously signed to Liberation Music.

As part of a restructure of the Mushroom Group in July 2024, Liberation Records and other labels were consolidated into a new division called Mushroom Music.

== Artists ==
- Adalita
- British India
- Custom Kings
- D.D Dumbo
- Dan Sultan
- Emma Louise
- Gordi
- Husky
- Josef Salvat
- Julia Jacklin
- Little Red
- Lotte Gallagher
- Melody Pool
- Merci, Mercy
- R.W. Grace
- Seeker Lover Keeper
- Snakadaktal
- TZU
- The Holidays
- The Temper Trap
- Vance Joy
- World's End Press
