= Sam Smith discography =

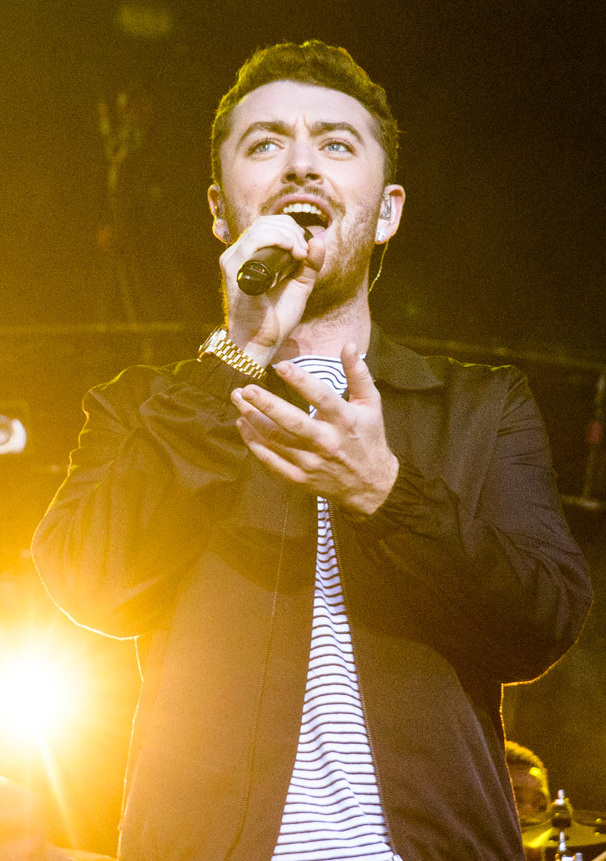
- Smith performing at Lollapalooza at Berlin Tempelhof Airport in Germany, 2015
- Studio albums: 5
- EPs: 13
- Singles: 39
- Remix albums: 1
- Promotional singles: 6
- Live albums: 3
- Independent albums: 1

The English singer and songwriter Sam Smith has released five studio albums, one independent album, three live albums, one remix album, one soundtrack, thirteen extended plays (EPs), thirty-seven singles (featuring on eight singles), and six promotional singles.

Smith has reportedly sold 64 million albums, 394 million singles worldwide and over 57 billion career streams, becoming one of the best-selling British pop artists of the past decade. Billboard ranked Smith as the 12th most successful male solo artist of the 2010s decade (25th overall). According to RIAA, Smith has sold 51 million certified digital singles in the United States. Smith has scored eight number-one singles and three number-one albums in the United Kingdom. Official Charts named Smith's debut studio album In the Lonely Hour as the biggest selling debut album of the decade, as well as the sixth most successful album of the decade in the UK.

In the Lonely Hour, Smith's debut studio album, was released in May 2014. Smith debuted in October 2012 as a featured artist on English electronic music duo Disclosure's single "Latch", which peaked at number 11 on the UK singles chart. In February 2013, "Lay Me Down" as the lead single from the album. In May 2013, they featured on record producer Naughty Boy's single "La La La". The single was released on 19 May 2013 and peaked to number one in the UK. In October 2013 Smith released their first EP Nirvana. "Money on My Mind" was released as the second single from the album on 16 February 2014, the song peaked at number one on the UK singles chart. "Stay with Me" was released as the third single from the album on 14 April 2014, the song peaked to number one on the UK singles chart. "I'm Not the Only One" was the album's fourth single. It was released on 31 August 2014, peaking to number three on the UK singles chart. "Like I Can" was released as the album's fifth single on 5 December 2014, peaking at No. 9 on the UK singles chart, becoming Smith's fourth consecutive top-ten hit as a lead artist in the UK.

A re-release of "Lay Me Down" was released as the sixth single from the album on 22 February 2015, peaking at No. 15 on the UK singles chart. In the same month Smith recorded another version of the song, featuring John Legend, for the British charity television programme Comic Relief, the song reached number one in the UK. In July 2015, Smith was featured on Disclosure's single "Omen", peaking at No. 13 in the UK. On 8 September 2015, Smith confirmed that their new song "Writing's on the Wall" would be the theme song to the 24th James Bond film Spectre. The song was released on 25 September 2015 and became the first Bond theme ever to go to number one in the UK. Smith's second studio album, The Thrill of It All, followed in 2017 and topped the charts in the United Kingdom, Canada, Ireland, the Netherlands, New Zealand, Sweden, and the United States. Its lead single "Too Good at Goodbyes" reached number one in the United Kingdom, Australia, and New Zealand and also reached the top 5 in Canada, Denmark, the Netherlands, and the United States.

== Albums ==
=== Studio albums ===
Title	Details	Peak chart positions										Sales	Certifications
Title	Details	UK	AUS	CAN	DEN	GER	IRE	NL	NZ	SWE	US	Sales	Certifications
In the Lonely Hour	Released: 26 May 2014; Label: Capitol; Formats: CD, LP, digital download, streaming	1	1	2	2	17	1	3	1	1	2	UK: 3,000,927	BPI: 10× Platinum; ARIA: 6× Platinum; BVMI: Platinum; GLF: 2× Platinum; IFPI DEN: 8× Platinum; MC: 8× Platinum; NVPI: Platinum; RIAA: 5× Platinum; RMNZ: 13× Platinum
The Thrill of It All	Released: 3 November 2017; Label: Capitol; Formats: CD, LP, digital download, streaming	1	2	1	1	8	1	1	1	1	1	UK: 780,259; WW: 1,400,000	BPI: 2× Platinum; ARIA: Platinum; GLF: Gold; IFPI DEN: Platinum; MC: 2× Platinum; NVPI: Platinum; RIAA: 2× Platinum; RMNZ: 3× Platinum
Love Goes	Released: 30 October 2020; Label: Capitol; Formats: CD, LP, cassette, digital download, streaming	2	3	3	12	11	3	6	4	12	5		BPI: Platinum; ARIA: Platinum; IFPI DEN: Gold; MC: 2× Platinum; RIAA: Platinum; RMNZ: Platinum
Gloria	Released: 27 January 2023; Label: Capitol; Formats: CD, LP, cassette, digital download, streaming	1	1	4	14	6	1	2	2	6	7		BPI: Silver; MC: Gold; RMNZ: Gold
Hazel Eyes	Released: 21 August 2026; Label: Capitol; Formats: CD, LP, digital download, streaming	21	37	—	—	18	—	30	—	—	— (Note: Hazel Eyes did not enter the Billboard 200 chart, but peaked at number 30 on the Top Album Sales chart.)		

=== Live albums ===
Title	Details	Peak chart positions	
Title	Details	US Current	FRA
Live from the Roundhouse	Released: 1 January 2014; Labels: Capitol; Formats: Digital download, streaming	―	―
Love Goes: Live at Abbey Road Studios	Released: 19 March 2021; Label: Capitol; Formats: CD, LP, digital download, streaming	80	129
BBC Proms at the Royal Albert Hall	Released: 12 April 2025; Labels: Capitol; Formats: 2×LP, digital download, streaming	―	―

=== Unauthorized albums ===
Title	Details
The Lost Tapes – Remixed	Released: 15 May 2015; Label: Kosmo; Formats: CD, digital download
Diva Boy	Released: 4 January 2019; Label: Venus & Mars Music, Orestes Music; Formats: Digital download, streaming
Live at the Spectator	Released: 4 January 2019; Label: Orestes Music; Formats: Digital download, streaming

== Extended plays ==
Title	Details	Peak chart positions	
Title	Details	CAN	US
Nirvana	Released: 4 October 2013; Label: Capitol; Formats: LP, digital download, streaming	—	126
Spotify Singles (Note: A Spotify–exclusive EP consisting of The Thrill of It All song "Burning" with a cover of "Get Here".)	Released: 31 January 2018; Labels: Capitol; Formats: Digital download, streaming	—	—
Dance	Released: 17 July 2020; Label: Capitol; Formats: Streaming	—	—
Heartbreak	Released: 24 July 2020; Label: Capitol; Formats: Streaming	—	—
Heal	Released: 7 August 2020; Label: Capitol; Formats: Streaming	—	—
Stripped	Released: 14 August 2020; Label: Capitol; Formats: Streaming	—	—
Remix	Released: 21 August 2020; Label: Capitol; Formats: Streaming	—	—
Roses Are Red	Released: 17 November 2020; Label: Capitol; Formats: Streaming	—	—
Violets Are Blue	Released: 24 November 2020; Label: Capitol; Formats: Streaming	—	—
Blossom	Released: 27 November 2020; Label: Capitol; Formats: Streaming	—	—
Loves Me, Loves Me Not	Released: 1 December 2020; Label: Capitol; Formats: Streaming	—	—
The Holly & the Ivy	Released: 4 December 2020; Label: Capitol; Formats: Streaming	—	—
Live	Released: 26 February 2021; Label: Capitol; Formats: Streaming	—	—
Live from the Royal Albert Hall (Note: An EP consisting of songs performed at the Royal Albert Hall in October 2022.)	Released: 29 November 2022; Label: Capitol; Formats: Streaming	26	77
A Lonely Christmas	Released: 20 November 2023; Label: Capitol; Formats: Streaming	—	—

== Singles ==
=== As lead artist ===
Title	Year	Peak chart positions										Certifications	Album
Title	Year	UK	AUS	CAN	DEN	GER	IRE	NL	NZ	SWE	US	Certifications	Album
"Lay Me Down"	2013	46	—	—	—	—	—	—	—	—	— (Note: "Lay Me Down" originally did not enter the Billboard Hot 100 on its first release, but peaked at number 25 on the Bubbling Under Hot 100 Singles chart.)		Nirvana
"Money on My Mind"	2014	1	51	—	18	11	4	32	12	18	— (Note: "Money on My Mind" did not enter the Billboard Hot 100, but peaked at number 7 on the Bubbling Under Hot 100 Singles chart.)	BPI: 2× Platinum; ARIA: Platinum; BVMI: Gold; GLF: 2× Platinum; IFPI DEN: 2× Platinum; MC: Platinum; NVPI: 2× Platinum; RIAA: Platinum; RMNZ: 2× Platinum	In the Lonely Hour
"Stay with Me"	2014	1	5	1	3	11	1	2	1	4	2	BPI: 6× Platinum; ARIA: 14× Platinum; BVMI: 5× Gold; GLF: 8× Platinum; IFPI DEN: 5× Platinum; MC: 4× Platinum; NVPI: 3× Platinum; RIAA: Diamond; RMNZ: 8× Platinum	In the Lonely Hour
"I'm Not the Only One"	2014	3	11	2	5	39	6	16	3	13	5	BPI: 4× Platinum; ARIA: 10× Platinum; BVMI: Platinum; GLF: 3× Platinum; IFPI DEN: 4× Platinum; MC: 2× Platinum; NVPI: Gold; RIAA: 7× Platinum; RMNZ: 8× Platinum	In the Lonely Hour
"Like I Can"	2014	9	20	53	12	45	11	8	19	25	99	BPI: 3× Platinum; ARIA: 5× Platinum; BVMI: Gold; GLF: Platinum; IFPI DEN: 2× Platinum; RIAA: Platinum; RMNZ: 3× Platinum	In the Lonely Hour
"Have Yourself a Merry Little Christmas"	2014	53	47	66	33	41	46	—	—	26	90	BPI: Platinum; ARIA: Platinum; IFPI DEN: Gold; MC: Platinum; RIAA: Gold; RMNZ: Gold	Non-album single
"Lay Me Down" (2015 re-release)	2015	15	3	10	—	—	14	—	2	68	8	BPI: 2× Platinum; ARIA: 7× Platinum; BVMI: Gold; GLF: Platinum; IFPI DEN: Gold; RIAA: 5× Platinum; RMNZ: 4× Platinum	In the Lonely Hour
"Lay Me Down" (Red Nose Day re-release featuring John Legend)	2015	1	—	—	—	—	4	— (Note: "Lay Me Down" featuring John Legend did not enter the Dutch Top 40 but peaked at number 18 on the Tipparade chart, which acts as an extension to the Dutch Top 40)	—	—	—	BPI: Platinum	In the Lonely Hour (Drowning Shadows Edition)
"Writing's on the Wall"	2015	1	43	43	—	17	9	35	— (Note: "Writing's on the Wall" did not enter the NZ Top 40 Singles Chart, but peaked at number 4 on the NZ Heatseekers chart.)	63	71	BPI: Platinum; ARIA: Platinum; MC: Platinum; RIAA: Platinum; RMNZ: Gold	Non-album single
"Momentarily Mine"	2016	—	—	—	—	—	—	—	—	—	—		Diva Boy
"Too Good at Goodbyes"	2017	1	1	2	2	18	2	5	1	2	4	BPI: 4× Platinum; ARIA: 10× Platinum; BVMI: Platinum; GLF: 4× Platinum; IFPI DEN: 4× Platinum; MC: 9× Platinum; RIAA: 6× Platinum; RMNZ: 7× Platinum	The Thrill of It All
"One Last Song"	2017	27	94	66	―	―	36	—	― (Note: "One Last Song" did not enter the NZ Top 40 Singles Chart, but peaked at number two on the NZ Heatseeker Singles Chart.)	46	― (Note: "One Last Song" did not enter the Billboard Hot 100, but peaked at number eight on the Bubbling Under Hot 100 Singles chart.)	BPI: Gold; ARIA: Platinum; MC: Gold; RIAA: Gold; RMNZ: Platinum	The Thrill of It All
"Pray" (solo or featuring Logic)	2018	26	41	44	38	—	29	47	32	42	55	BPI: Gold; ARIA: Platinum; GLF: Gold; MC: 2× Platinum; RIAA: Gold; RMNZ: Platinum	The Thrill of It All
"Baby, You Make Me Crazy"	2018	—	—	—	—	—	87	—	—	95	—	ARIA: Gold; MC: Gold; RMNZ: Gold	The Thrill of It All
"Promises" (with Calvin Harris)	2018	1	4	15	4	2	1	2	7	3	65	BPI: 3× Platinum; ARIA: 6× Platinum; BVMI: Platinum; IFPI DEN: 2× Platinum; MC: Gold; RIAA: Platinum; RMNZ: 4× Platinum	Love Goes
"Fire on Fire"	2018	63	93	—	—	—	38	42	— (Note: "Fire on Fire" did not enter the NZ Top 40 Singles Chart, but peaked at number 13 on the NZ Hot Singles Chart.)	16	—	BPI: Platinum; ARIA: 2× Platinum; BVMI: Gold; IFPI DEN: Gold; MC: 2× Platinum; RIAA: Platinum; RMNZ: Platinum	Love Goes
"Dancing with a Stranger" (with Normani)	2019	3	6	8	3	37	4	6	7	3	7	BPI: 3× Platinum; ARIA: 8× Platinum; BVMI: Gold; GLF: 2× Platinum; IFPI DEN: Gold; MC: 4× Platinum; RIAA: 4× Platinum; RMNZ: 5× Platinum	Love Goes
"How Do You Sleep?"	2019	7	10	16	14	43	4	7	5	20	24	BPI: Platinum; ARIA: 5× Platinum; BVMI: Gold; GLF: Platinum; IFPI DEN: Gold; MC: 4× Platinum; RIAA: 2× Platinum; RMNZ: 3× Platinum	Love Goes
"Get Happy" (with Renée Zellweger)	2019	—	—	—	—	—	—	—	—	—	—		Judy
"I Feel Love"	2019	76	—	—	—	—	78	—	— (Note: "I Feel Love" did not enter the NZ Top 40 Singles Chart, but peaked at number 22 on the NZ Hot Singles Chart.)	—	— (Note: "I Feel Love" did not enter the US Billboard Hot 100 but peaked at number 14 on the Digital Song Sales chart.)		Non-album single
"To Die For"	2020	18	15	56	—	90	21	75	34	51	46	BPI: Gold; ARIA: 2× Platinum; GLF: Gold; MC: Platinum; RIAA: Gold; RMNZ: Platinum	Love Goes
"I'm Ready" (with Demi Lovato)	2020	20	25	30	—	66	13	78	28	34	36	BPI: Silver; ARIA: Platinum; MC: Gold; RIAA: Gold; RMNZ: Gold	Love Goes
"My Oasis" (featuring Burna Boy)	2020	43	84	70	—	—	43	— (Note: "My Oasis" did not enter the Netherlands Top 100 Singles Chart, but peaked at number 8 on the Netherlands Single Tip chart.)	— (Note: "My Oasis" did not enter the NZ Top 40 Singles Chart, but peaked at number five on the NZ Hot Singles Chart.)	— (Note: "My Oasis" did not enter the Swedish Singellista Chart, but peaked at number one on the Swedish Heatseeker Chart.)	— (Note: "My Oasis" did not enter the Billboard Hot 100, but peaked at number 12 on the Bubbling Under Hot 100 chart.)	BPI: Silver; ARIA: Gold; MC: Gold	Love Goes
"Temptation" (with Tiwa Savage)	2020	—	—	—	—	—	—	—	—	—	—		Celia
"Diamonds"	2020	11	33	19	—	69	19	25	39	71	39	BPI: Platinum; ARIA: 2× Platinum; MC: 2× Platinum; RIAA: Platinum; RMNZ: Platinum	Love Goes
"Kids Again"	2020	89	—	—	—	—	73	—	— (Note: "Kids Again" did not enter the Official New Zealand Music Chart, but peaked at number ten on the Hot 40 Singles chart.)	— (Note: "Kids Again" did not enter the Swedish Singellista Chart, but peaked at number 14 on the Swedish Heatseeker Chart.)	—		Love Goes
"The Lighthouse Keeper"	2020	72	—	—	—	—	97	—	— (Note: "The Lighthouse Keeper" did not enter the NZ Top 40 Singles Chart, but peaked at number 27 on the NZ Hot Singles Chart.)	— (Note: "The Lighthouse Keeper" did not enter the Swedish Singellista Chart, but peaked at number eight on the Swedish Heatseeker Chart.)	—		Non-album single
"You Will Be Found" (with Summer Walker)	2021	—	—	—	—	—	—	—	— (Note: "You Will Be Found" did not enter the NZ Top 40 Singles Chart, but peaked at number 28 on the NZ Hot Singles Chart.)	—	—		Dear Evan Hansen
"Love Me More"	2022	52	—	52	—	—	54	—	— (Note: "Love Me More" did not enter the NZ Top 40 Singles Chart, but peaked at number five on the NZ Hot Singles Chart.)	— (Note: "Love Me More" did not enter the Swedish Singellista Chart, but peaked at number seven on the Swedish Heatseeker Chart.)	73	ARIA: Gold; MC: Gold; RMNZ: Gold	Gloria
"Unholy" (with Kim Petras)	2022	1	1	1	3	2	1	3	1	4	1	BPI: 2× Platinum; ARIA: 7× Platinum; BVMI: Platinum; GLF: Platinum; IFPI DEN: Platinum; MC: 6× Platinum; RIAA: 2× Platinum; RMNZ: 4× Platinum	Gloria
"Night Before Christmas"	2022	—	—	—	—	67	—	—	— (Note: "Night Before Christmas" did not enter the NZ Top 40 Singles Chart, but peaked at number 36 on the NZ Hot Singles Chart.)	61	—		Non-album single
"Gimme" (with Koffee and Jessie Reyez)	2023	60	—	75	—	—	63	—	— (Note: "Gimme" did not enter the NZ Top 40 Singles Chart, but peaked at number 11 on the NZ Hot Singles Chart.)	— (Note: "Gimme" did not enter the Swedish Singellista Chart, but peaked at number three on the Swedish Heatseeker Chart.)	—		Gloria
"I'm Not Here to Make Friends"	2023	23	40	32	—	100	32	64	— (Note: "I'm Not Here to Make Friends" did not enter the NZ Top 40 Singles Chart, but peaked at number two on the NZ Hot Singles Chart.)	— (Note: "I'm Not Here to Make Friends" did not enter the Swedish Singellista Chart, but peaked at number two on the Swedish Heatseeker Chart.)	71	ARIA: Gold	Gloria
"Beautiful"	2023	—	—	—	—	—	—	—	—	—	—		Non-album singles
"Vulgar" (with Madonna)	2023	69	—	— (Note: "Vulgar" did not enter the Canadian Hot 100 but peaked at number 20 on the Hot Canadian Digital Song Sales chart.)	—	—	77	—	— (Note: "Vulgar" did not enter the NZ Top 40 Singles Chart, but peaked at number 21 on the NZ Hot Singles Chart.)	— (Note: "Vulgar" did not enter the Swedish Singellista Chart, but peaked at number nine on the Swedish Heatseeker Chart.)	— (Note: "Vulgr" did not enter the US Billboard Hot 100 but peaked at number 16 on the Digital Song Sales chart.)		Non-album singles
"Desire" (with Calvin Harris)	2023	6	84	—	32	78	9	11	— (Note: "Desire" did not enter the NZ Top 40 Singles Chart, but peaked at number 10 on the NZ Hot Singles Chart.)	76	—	BPI: Platinum; ARIA: Gold; IFPI DEN: Platinum; RMNZ: Gold	96 Months
"In the City" (with Charli XCX)	2023	41	—	—	—	—	47	—	— (Note: "In the City" did not enter the NZ Top 40 Singles Chart, but peaked at number eight on the NZ Hot Singles Chart.)	49	—		Non-album single
"Love Is a Stillness"	2025	—	—	—	—	—	—	—	— (Note: "Love Is a Stillness" did not enter the NZ Top 40 Singles Chart, but peaked at number 18 on the NZ Hot Singles Chart.)	—	—		Hazel Eyes
"To Be Free"	2025	— (Note: "To Be Free" did not enter the UK Singles Chart but peaked at number 18 on the Official Vinyl Singles Chart.)	—	—	—	—	—	—	— (Note: "To Be Free" did not enter the NZ Top 40 Singles Chart, but peaked at number 21 on the NZ Hot Singles Chart.)	—	—		Hazel Eyes
"My Guy"	2026	—	—	—	—	—	—	—	— (Note: "My Guy" did not enter the NZ Top 40 Singles Chart, but it peaked at number 28 on the NZ Hot Singles Chart.)	—	—		Hazel Eyes
"Oh Mother" (featuring the TwoCity Chorus)	2026	— (Note: "Oh Mother" did not enter the UK singles chart but peaked at No. 55 on the UK Singles Downloads Chart.)	—	—	—	—	—	—	—	—	—		Hazel Eyes
"When He's Gone"	2026	—	—	—	—	—	—	—	— (Note: "When He's Gone" did not enter the NZ Top 40 Singles Chart, but peaked at number 25 on the NZ Hot Singles Chart.)	—	—		Hazel Eyes
"Constant Companion"	2026	—	—	—	—	—	—	—	— (Note: "Constant Companion" did not enter the NZ Top 40 Singles Chart, but peaked at number 36 on the NZ Hot Singles Chart.)	—	—		Hazel Eyes
"—" denotes a single that did not chart or was not released in that territory.

=== As featured artist ===
Title	Year	Peak chart positions										Certifications	Album
Title	Year	UK	AUS	CAN	DEN	GER	IRE	NL	NZ	SWE	US	Certifications	Album
"Latch" (Disclosure featuring Sam Smith)	2012	11	47	6	13	—	35	60	39	30	7	BPI: 4× Platinum; ARIA: 6× Platinum; BVMI: Platinum; GLF: 2× Platinum; IFPI DEN: Platinum; MC: 2× Platinum; RIAA: 3× Platinum; RMNZ: 8× Platinum	Settle
"La La La" (Naughty Boy featuring Sam Smith)	2013	1	5	43	2	2	3	4	5	13	19	BPI: 3× Platinum; ARIA: 2× Platinum; BVMI: 3× Gold; GLF: 3× Platinum; IFPI DEN: 4× Platinum; MC: Gold; RIAA: 2× Platinum; RMNZ: 4× Platinum	Hotel Cabana
"When It's Alright" (Juun featuring Sam Smith)	2014	—	—	—	—	74	—	—	—	—	—		The Lost Tapes – Remixed
"God Only Knows" (as part of BBC Music and Friends)	2014	20	—	—	—	—	77	—	—	—	—		Non-album singles
"Do They Know It's Christmas?" (as part of Band Aid 30)	2014	1	3	8	35	2	1	4	2	—	63	BPI: Gold	Non-album singles
"Moments" (Freddy Verano featuring Sam Smith)	2015	—	—	—	—	—	—	—	—	—	—		The Lost Tapes – Remixed
"Omen" (Disclosure featuring Sam Smith)	2015	13	29	43	27	74	29	27	8	56	64	BPI: Platinum; IFPI DEN: Gold; RIAA: Gold; RMNZ: 2× Platinum	Caracal
"Party of One" (Brandi Carlile featuring Sam Smith)	2018	—	—	—	—	—	—	—	—	—	—		By the Way, I Forgive You
"Go" (Cat Burns featuring Sam Smith)	2022	—	97	—	—	—	—	—	—	—	—	IFPI DEN: Platinum	Non-album single
"—" denotes a single that did not chart or was not released in that territory.

=== Promotional singles ===
Title	Year	Peak chart positions										Certifications	Album
Title	Year	UK	AUS	CAN	DEN	GER	IRE	NL	NZ	SWE	US	Certifications	Album
"Bad Day All Week"	2008	—	—	—	—	—	—	—	—	—	—		Non-album promotional singles
"When It's Alright"	2009	—	—	—	—	—	—	—	—	—	—		Non-album promotional singles
"Burning"	2017	63	75	63	—	—	56	81	— (Note: "Burning" did not enter the NZ Top 40 Singles Chart, but peaked at number 3 on the NZ Heatseekers chart.)	27	— (Note: "Burning" originally did not enter the Billboard Hot 100 on its first release, but peaked at number 7 on the Bubbling Under Hot 100 Singles chart.)	BPI: Silver; ARIA: Gold; GLF: Gold; MC: Gold; RIAA: Gold; RMNZ: Gold	The Thrill of It All
"Fix You"	2020	—	—	—	—	—	—	—	— (Note: "Fix You" did not enter the NZ Top 40 Singles Chart, but peaked at number 16 on the NZ Hot Singles Chart.)	—	—		Love Goes (Japanese edition)
"Perfect" (with Jessie Reyez and Cat Burns)	2023	—	—	—	—	—	—	—	— (Note: "Perfect" did not enter the NZ Top 40 Singles Chart, but peaked at number 30 on the NZ Hot Singles Chart.)	—	—		Non-album single
"Man I Am"	2023	58	—	—	—	—	68	—	—	—	—		Barbie the Album
"—" denotes a promotional single that did not chart or was not released in that territory.

== Other charted songs ==
Title	Year	Peak chart positions										Certifications	Album
Title	Year	UK	AUS	BEL (FL) Tip	CAN	IRE	JAP	NL	NZ Heat./ Hot	SWE	US	Certifications	Album
"Safe with Me"	2013	86	—	—	—	—	—	—	—	—	—		Nirvana
"Nirvana"	2013	82	—	—	—	—	—	—	—	—	—	ARIA: Gold; IFPI DEN: Gold; MC: Gold; RIAA: Gold; RMNZ: Gold	Nirvana
"Latch" (Acoustic)	2013	192	—	—	—	—	—	86	—	—	— (Note: "Latch" (Acoustic) did not enter the Billboard Hot 100, but peaked at number 10 on the Bubbling Under Hot 100 Singles chart.)	BPI: Gold; IFPI DEN: Gold; RIAA: Platinum	Nirvana
"Together" (with Disclosure, Nile Rodgers and Jimmy Napes)	2013	135	—	78	—	—	—	—	—	—	—		Settle: The Remixes
"Leave Your Lover"	2014	109	—	—	57	—	—	—	—	—	92	BPI: Silver; ARIA: Platinum; MC: Platinum; RIAA: Platinum; RMNZ: Gold	In the Lonely Hour
"I've Told You Now"	2014	—	—	—	—	—	—	—	—	—	—	BPI: Silver; MC: Gold; RIAA: Gold	In the Lonely Hour
"Life Support"	2014	—	—	—	—	—	—	—	—	—	—	RIAA: Gold	In the Lonely Hour
"Make It to Me"	2014	193	—	—	—	—	—	—	—	—	—	BPI: Silver; ARIA: Platinum; MC: Platinum; RIAA: Platinum; IFPI DEN: Gold; RMNZ: Platinum	In the Lonely Hour
"Not in That Way"	2014	—	—	—	—	—	—	—	—	—	— (Note: "Not in That Way" did not enter the Billboard Hot 100, but peaked at number 20 on the Bubbling Under Hot 100 Singles chart.)	BPI: Silver; ARIA: Gold; MC: Gold; RIAA: Platinum; RMNZ: Gold	In the Lonely Hour
"Restart"	2015	—	—	—	—	—	93	— (Note: "Restart" did not enter the Dutch Singles Chart but peaked at number 1 on the Tipparade chart.)	—	—	—		In the Lonely Hour
"Drowning Shadows"	2015	108	55	28	—	—	—	—	—	—	—		In the Lonely Hour (Drowning Shadows Edition)
"How Will I Know"	2016	116	—	—	—	—	—	—	—	—	—	BPI: Silver; ARIA: Gold; IFPI DEN: Gold; MC: Gold; RIAA: Gold; RMNZ: Gold	In the Lonely Hour (Drowning Shadows Edition)
"Say It First"	2017	—	—	—	88	63	—	100	3	66	— (Note: "Say It First" originally did not enter the Billboard Hot 100 on its first release, but peaked at number 20 on the Bubbling Under Hot 100 Singles chart.)	ARIA: Gold; MC: Gold	The Thrill of It All
"No Peace" (featuring Yebba)	2017	—	—	—	100	77	—	—	—	83	—	BPI: Silver; ARIA: Gold; MC: Gold; RMNZ: Gold	The Thrill of It All
"Him"	2017	—	—	—	—	73	—	—	—	84	—	MC: Gold	The Thrill of It All
"Midnight Train"	2017	—	—	—	—	75	—	—	—	88	—	ARIA: Gold; MC: Gold	The Thrill of It All
"Nothing Left for You"	2017	—	—	—	—	97	—	—	—	— (Note: "Nothing Left for You" did not enter the Swedish Singellista Chart, but peaked at number three on the Swedish Heatseekers Chart.)	—		The Thrill of It All
"Scars"	2017	—	—	—	—	—	—	—	—	— (Note: "Scars" did not enter the Swedish Singellista Chart, but peaked at number five on the Swedish Heatseekers Chart.)	—		The Thrill of It All
"Palace"	2017	—	—	—	—	—	61	—	—	— (Note: "Palace" did not enter the Swedish Singellista Chart, but peaked at number seven on the Swedish Heatseekers Chart.)	— (Note: "Palace" did not enter the Billboard Hot 100, but peaked at number seven on the Bubbling Under Hot 100 Singles chart.)	MC: Gold; RIAA: Gold	The Thrill of It All
"The Thrill of It All"	2017	—	—	—	—	—	—	—	—	— (Note: "The Thrill of It All" did not enter the Swedish Singellista Chart, but peaked at number 12 on the Swedish Heatseekers Chart.)	—		The Thrill of It All
"One Day at a Time"	2017	—	—	—	—	—	—	—	—	— (Note: "One Day at a Time" did not enter the Swedish Singellista Chart, but peaked at number 15 on the Swedish Heatseekers Chart.)	—		The Thrill of It All
"River"	2017	—	—	—	—	—	—	—	—	— (Note: "River" did not enter the Swedish Singellista Chart, but peaked at number three on the Swedish Heatseekers Chart.)	—		Spotify Singles – Holiday
"Another One"	2020	—	—	—	—	—	—	—	26	—	—		Love Goes
"Young"	2020	—	—	—	—	—	—	—	30	—	—		Love Goes
"Love Goes" (featuring Labrinth)	2020	—	—	—	—	—	—	—	—	— (Note: "Love Goes" did not enter the Swedish Singellista Chart, but peaked at number five on the Swedish Heatseeker Chart.)	—		Love Goes
"No God"	2023	—	—	—	—	—	—	—	25	—	—		Gloria
"Lose You"	2023	— (Note: "Lose You" did not enter the UK Singles Chart but peaked at number 74 on the UK Singles Downloads Chart.)	—	—	—	—	—	—	26	—	—		Gloria
"Who We Love" (with Ed Sheeran)	2023	85	—	—	— (Note: "Who We Love" did not enter the Canadian Hot 100 but peaked at number 14 on the Hot Canadian Digital Song Sales chart.)	70	—	—	19	— (Note: "Who We Love" did not enter the Swedish Singellista Chart, but peaked at number eight on the Swedish Heatseeker Chart.)	—		Gloria
"—" denotes a song that did not chart or was not released in that territory.

== Guest appearances ==
Title	Year	Other artists	Album
"Daniel"	2018	—N/a	Revamp: Reimagining the Songs of Elton John & Bernie Taupin
"Get Happy"	2019	—N/a	Judy
"If the World Was Ending (In Support of Doctors Without Borders)"	2020	JP Saxe, Julia Michaels & Friends	Non-album songs
"Everywhere (BBC Children In Need)"	2021	Niall Horan and Anne-Marie	Non-album songs
"Ahi"	2024	Anitta	Funk Generation
"You Make Me Feel (Mighty Real)"	2024	Moses Sumney and Lyra Pramuk	Transa
"Ever New"	2024	Beverly Glenn-Copeland	Transa
"Pint"	TBD	Nettspend	Non-album song
