= The Thrill of It All Tour =

2018–19 concert tour by Sam Smith

- World tour by Sam Smith
- Location: North America • South America • Africa • Europe • Oceania • Asia
- Associated album: The Thrill of It All
- Start date: 20 March 2018
- End date: 18 April 2019
- No. of shows: 106
- Attendance: 1,083,732
- Box office: $86,100,000

Sam Smith concert chronology
- In the Lonely Hour Tour (2015); The Thrill of It All Tour (2018–19); Gloria the Tour (2023)

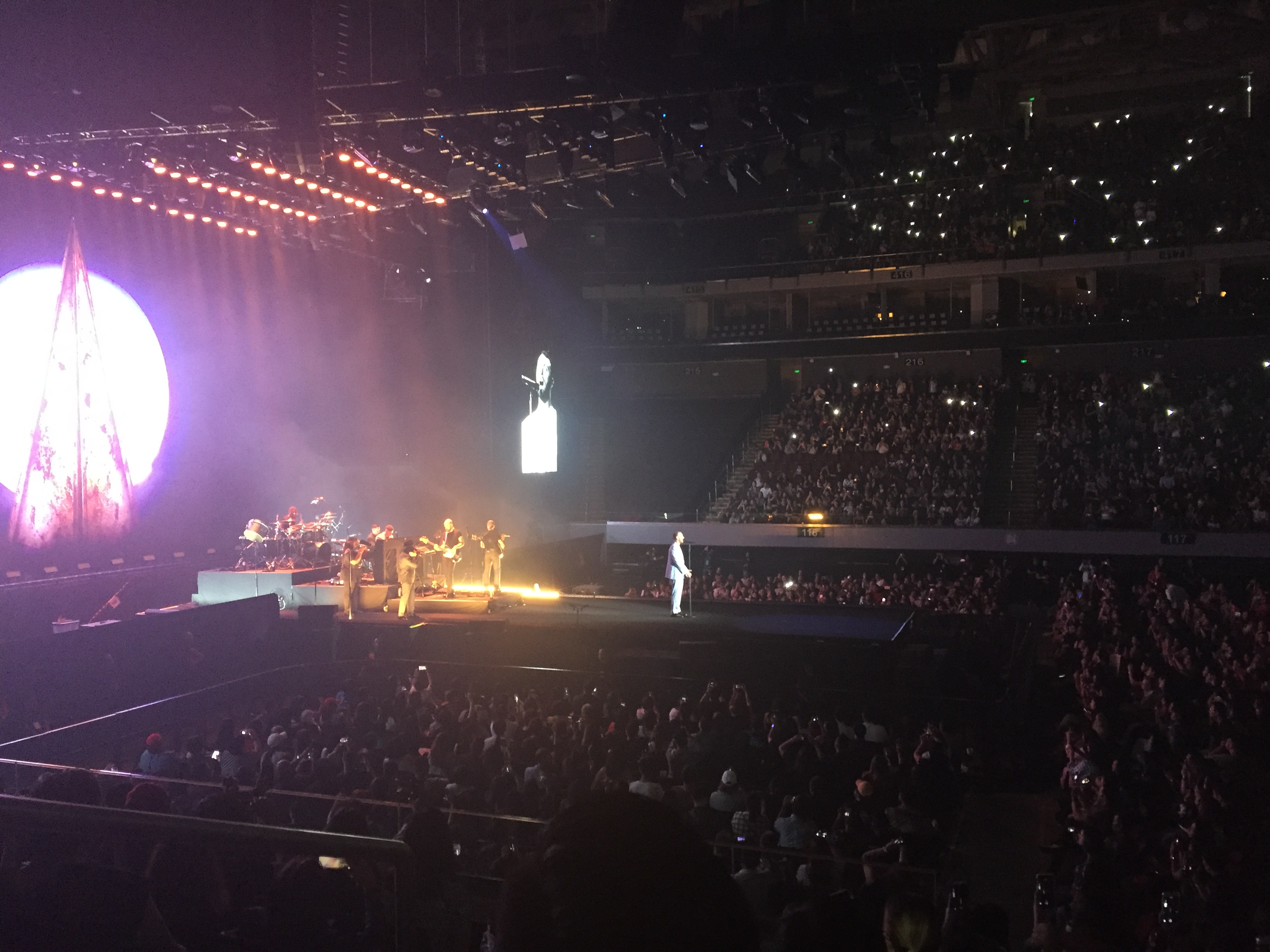
Smith performing in Pasay, 2018

The Thrill of It All Tour was the second concert tour by English singer Sam Smith, in support of their second album The Thrill of It All (2017). It began on 20 March 2018 in Sheffield, England, and concluded on 18 April 2019 in Cape Town, South Africa. In December 2018, Billboard concluded that after 94 shows, Smith grossed $86.1 million and sold 1.07 million tickets on The Thrill of It All Tour. It pushed their career total gross to $102.7 million from 1.4 million tickets sold.

== Setlist ==
1. "Burning"
2. "One Last Song"
3. "I'm Not the Only One"
4. "Lay Me Down"
5. "I Sing Because I'm Happy"
6. "Omen"
7. "Nirvana"
8. "I've Told You Now"
9. "Writing's on the Wall"
10. "Latch"
11. "Money on My Mind"
12. "Like I Can"
13. "Restart"
14. "Baby, You Make Me Crazy"
15. "Say It First"
16. "Midnight Train"
17. "Him"
18. "Too Good At Goodbyes"
19. "Palace"
20. "Stay With Me"
21. "Pray"

== Tour dates ==
| Date | City | Country | Venue | Attendance | Revenue |
Europe
| 20 March 2018 | Sheffield | England | Sheffield Arena | 11,335 / 11,618 | $719,740 |
| 21 March 2018 | Newcastle | England | Metro Radio Arena | 9,000 / 9,235 | $583,442 |
| 23 March 2018 | Glasgow | Scotland | SSE Hydro | 21,969 / 22,246 | $1,319,492 |
| 24 March 2018 | Glasgow | Scotland | SSE Hydro | 21,969 / 22,246 | $1,319,492 |
| 27 March 2018 | Manchester | England | Manchester Arena | 32,433 / 32,433 | $1,992,347 |
| 28 March 2018 | Manchester | England | Manchester Arena | 32,433 / 32,433 | $1,992,347 |
| 30 March 2018 | Dublin | Ireland | 3Arena | 24,557 / 24,557 | $1,517,846 |
| 31 March 2018 | Dublin | Ireland | 3Arena | 24,557 / 24,557 | $1,517,846 |
| 3 April 2018 | Birmingham | England | Genting Arena | 26,558 / 26,558 | $1,673,846 |
| 4 April 2018 | Birmingham | England | Genting Arena | 26,558 / 26,558 | $1,673,846 |
| 6 April 2018 | London | England | The O_{2} Arena | 65,920 / 65,920 | $4,746,850 |
| 7 April 2018 | London | England | The O_{2} Arena | 65,920 / 65,920 | $4,746,850 |
| 9 April 2018 | London | England | The O_{2} Arena | 65,920 / 65,920 | $4,746,850 |
| 10 April 2018 | London | England | The O_{2} Arena | 65,920 / 65,920 | $4,746,850 |
| 19 April 2018 | Stockholm | Sweden | Globe Arena | 12,635 / 12,635 | $969,765 |
| 20 April 2018 | Copenhagen | Denmark | Royal Arena | 13,404 / 13,404 | $919,146 |
| 23 April 2018 | Oslo | Norway | Telenor Arena | 13,401 / 13,401 | $1,056,612 |
| 25 April 2018 | Berlin | Germany | Mercedes-Benz Arena | 7,646 / 7,646 | $519,662 |
| 27 April 2018 | Hamburg | Germany | Barclaycard Arena | 10,986 / 10,986 | $722,979 |
| 28 April 2018 | Cologne | Germany | Lanxess Arena | 14,578 / 14,600 | $918,397 |
| 30 April 2018 | Paris | France | AccorHotels Arena | 13,116 / 13,535 | $764,512 |
| 2 May 2018 | Amsterdam | Netherlands | Ziggo Dome | 25,548 / 25,548 (Note: Boxscore data is combined for shows on 2 and 5 May 2017.) | $1,633,371 |
| 4 May 2018 | Antwerp | Belgium | Sportpaleis | 17,369 / 17,694 | $1,083,780 |
| 5 May 2018 | Amsterdam | Netherlands | Ziggo Dome | — | — |
| 8 May 2018 | Vienna | Austria | Wiener Stadthalle | 10,190 / 10,190 | $620,512 |
| 9 May 2018 | Zürich | Switzerland | Hallenstadion | 11,441 / 11,550 | $929,980 |
| 11 May 2018 | Milan | Italy | Mediolanum Forum | 11,664 / 11,664 | $698,769 |
| 12 May 2018 | Verona | Italy | Arena di Verona | 12,221 / 12,221 | $704,547 |
| 15 May 2018 | Barcelona | Spain | Palau Sant Jordi | 6,105 / 6,105 | $388,200 |
| 16 May 2018 | Madrid | Spain | WiZink Center | 9,347 / 12,635 | $658,767 |
| 18 May 2018 | Lisbon | Portugal | Altice Arena | 12,387 / 12,387 | $765,771 |
| 26 May 2018 (Note: This concert was a part of the BBC Radio 1's Big Weekend.) | Swansea | Wales | Singleton Park | —N/a | —N/a |
| 1 June 2018 (Note: This concert was a part of the Orange Warsaw Festival.) | Warsaw | Poland | Racetrack Służewiec | —N/a | —N/a |
North America
| 18 June 2018 | Toronto | Canada | Air Canada Centre | 15,068 / 15,068 | $1,336,655 |
| 19 June 2018 | Montreal | Canada | Bell Centre | 12,294 / 13,098 | $863,968 |
| 22 June 2018 | Detroit | United States | Little Caesars Arena | 14,724 / 14,724 | $1,003,077 |
| 23 June 2018 | Columbus | United States | Nationwide Arena | 12,463 / 12,463 | $877,265 |
| 26 June 2018 | Boston | United States | TD Garden | 12,953 / 12,953 | $1,117,800 |
| 27 June 2018 | Brooklyn | United States | Barclays Center | 13,583 / 13,583 | $1,185,953 |
| 29 June 2018 | New York City | United States | Madison Square Garden | 25,635 / 25,635 | $2,172,209 |
| 30 June 2018 | New York City | United States | Madison Square Garden | 25,635 / 25,635 | $2,172,209 |
| 3 July 2018 | Washington, D.C. | United States | Capital One Arena | 11,419 / 11,783 | $1,123,741 |
| 4 July 2018 | Philadelphia | United States | Wells Fargo Center | 9,897 / 13,391 | $623,152 |
| 6 July 2018 | Charlotte | United States | Spectrum Center | 11,910 / 11,910 | $733,087 |
| 7 July 2018 | Nashville | United States | Bridgestone Arena | 13,435 / 13,648 | $767,222 |
| 10 July 2018 | Duluth | United States | Infinite Energy Center | 8,178 / 8,178 | $541,846 |
| 11 July 2018 | Orlando | United States | Amway Center | 10,486 / 10,486 | $749,982 |
| 13 July 2018 | Tampa | United States | Amalie Arena | 8,817 / 8,817 | $681,431 |
| 14 July 2018 | Miami | United States | American Airlines Arena | 11,470 / 11,470 | $955,880 |
| 17 July 2018 | New Orleans | United States | Smoothie King Center | 8,005 / 8,005 | $572,630 |
| 18 July 2018 | Houston | United States | Toyota Center | 8,908 / 8,908 | $610,123 |
| 20 July 2018 | Dallas | United States | American Airlines Center | 13,300 / 13,300 | $874,597 |
| 21 July 2018 | Austin | United States | Frank Erwin Center | 8,316 / 9,118 | $698,438 |
| 25 July 2018 | Monterrey | Mexico | Arena Monterrey | 13,500 / 14,320 | $483,552 |
| 27 July 2018 | Mexico City | Mexico | Palacio de los Deportes | 14,683 / 14,683 | $964,421 |
| 14 August 2018 | Saint Paul | United States | Xcel Energy Center | 11,891 / 15,247 | $721,892 |
| 15 August 2018 | Chicago | United States | United Center | 13,319 / 13,319 | $1,122,824 |
| 17 August 2018 | St. Louis | United States | Chaifetz Arena | 5,785 / 7,026 | $437,473 |
| 18 August 2018 | Kansas City | United States | Sprint Center | 8,703 / 8,703 | $593,530 |
| 21 August 2018 | Denver | United States | Pepsi Center | 8,763 / 8,763 | $650,838 |
| 22 August 2018 | Salt Lake City | United States | Vivint Smart Home Arena | 9,960 / 10,506 | $596,997 |
| 24 August 2018 | Sacramento | United States | Golden 1 Center | 13,360 / 13,360 | $975,394 |
| 25 August 2018 | Anaheim | United States | Honda Center | 11,671 / 11,671 | $931,449 |
| 28 August 2018 | Los Angeles | United States | Staples Center | 26,638 / 26,638 | $2,131,150 |
| 29 August 2018 | Los Angeles | United States | Staples Center | 26,638 / 26,638 | $2,131,150 |
| 31 August 2018 | Glendale | United States | Gila River Arena | 11,918 / 11,918 | $809,379 |
| 1 September 2018 | San Diego | United States | Valley View Casino Center | 9,779 / 10,074 | $808,783 |
| 4 September 2018 | Oakland | United States | Oracle Arena | 11,511 / 11,511 | $1,019,328 |
| 5 September 2018 | San Jose | United States | SAP Center | 10,602 / 10,602 | $976,419 |
| 7 September 2018 | Portland | United States | Moda Center | 10,193 / 12,820 | $902,931 |
| 8 September 2018 | Seattle | United States | Key Arena | —N/a | —N/a |
| 10 September 2018 | Vancouver | Canada | Rogers Arena | 13,857 / 13,857 | $1,135,206 |
| 12 September 2018 | Edmonton | Canada | Rogers Place | 10,612 / 10,840 | $732,766 |
| 13 September 2018 | Calgary | Canada | Scotiabank Saddledome | 11,478 / 11,478 | $808,603 |
Asia
| 2 October 2018 | Singapore | | Singapore Indoor Stadium | 16,025 / 16,025 | $2,720,815 |
| 3 October 2018 | Singapore | | Singapore Indoor Stadium | 16,025 / 16,025 | $2,720,815 |
| 5 October 2018 | Pasay | Philippines | Mall of Asia Arena | 6,751 / 6,751 | $787,502 |
| 9 October 2018 | Seoul | South Korea | Gocheok Sky Dome | 17,377 / 17,377 | $2,042,914 |
| 12 October 2018 | Saitama | Japan | Saitama Super Arena | 15,533 / 15,533 | $1,830,166 |
| 15 October 2018 | Osaka | Japan | Osaka-Jo Hall | 6,455 / 6,455 | $753,575 |
| 19 October 2018 | Macau | China | MGM Theater | 3,416 / 3,416 | $684,605 |
| 20 October 2018 | Macau | China | MGM Theater | 3,416 / 3,416 | $684,605 |
| 23 October 2018 | Shanghai | China | Mercedes-Benz Arena | 9,372 / 9,372 | $1,363,164 |
| 25 October 2018 | Beijing | China | Cadillac Arena | 6,874 / 6,874 | $944,105 |
| 28 October 2018 | Bangkok | Thailand | Impact Arena | 9,965 / 9,965 | $1,487,896 |
Oceania
| 2 November 2018 | Auckland | New Zealand | Spark Arena | 21,275 / 21,275 | $1,721,490 |
| 3 November 2018 | Auckland | New Zealand | Spark Arena | 21,275 / 21,275 | $1,721,490 |
| 6 November 2018 | Melbourne | Australia | Rod Laver Arena | 26,729 / 26,729 | $2,272,573 |
| 7 November 2018 | Melbourne | Australia | Rod Laver Arena | 26,729 / 26,729 | $2,272,573 |
| 10 November 2018 | Brisbane | Australia | Brisbane Entertainment Centre | 16,720 / 16,720 | $1,516,092 |
| 11 November 2018 | Brisbane | Australia | Brisbane Entertainment Centre | 16,720 / 16,720 | $1,516,092 |
| 14 November 2018 | Sydney | Australia | Qudos Bank Arena | 36,969 / 36,969 | $3,453,446 |
| 16 November 2018 | Sydney | Australia | Qudos Bank Arena | 36,969 / 36,969 | $3,453,446 |
| 17 November 2018 | Sydney | Australia | Qudos Bank Arena | 36,969 / 36,969 | $3,453,446 |
| 20 November 2018 | Perth | Australia | Perth Arena | 12,257 / 12,257 | $1,067,932 |
Asia
| 24 November 2018 | Abu Dhabi | United Arab Emirates | Du Arena | —N/a | —N/a |
South America
| 30 March 2019 (Note: This concert is a part of the Lollapalooza Argentina.) | Buenos Aires | Argentina | Hipódromo de San Isidro | —N/a | —N/a |
| 31 March 2019 (Note: This concert is a part of the Lollapalooza Chile.) | Santiago | Chile | O'Higgins Park | —N/a | —N/a |
| 4 April 2019 (Note: This concert is a part of Onix Day of Lollapalooza Brazil.) | São Paulo | Brazil | Autódromo José Carlos Pace | —N/a | —N/a |
| 5 April 2019 (Note: This concert is a part of the Lollapalooza Brazil.) | São Paulo | Brazil | Autódromo José Carlos Pace | —N/a | —N/a |
| 7 April 2019 (Note: This concert is a part of the Estéreo Picnic Festival.) | Bogotá | Colombia | Parque Deportivo | —N/a | —N/a |
Africa
| 13 April 2019 | Johannesburg | South Africa | Ticketpro Dome | 25,120 / 25,976 | $1,374,561 |
| 14 April 2019 | Johannesburg | South Africa | Ticketpro Dome | 25,120 / 25,976 | $1,374,561 |
| 16 April 2019 | Cape Town | South Africa | Grand Arena | —N/a | —N/a |
| 17 April 2019 | Cape Town | South Africa | Grand Arena | —N/a | —N/a |
| 18 April 2019 | Cape Town | South Africa | Grand Arena | —N/a | —N/a |
| Total | | | | 1,083,732 / 1,104,336 | $84,221,160 |
