= Steve Fitzmaurice =

Irish record producer

Stephen Fitzmaurice is an Irish mixer and producer based in London, England. His credits include albums for Depeche Mode, Seal, Sam Smith, Ian Brown, Kylie Minogue, Mónica Naranjo, Sting, Paloma Faith, Olly Murs, The Kooks, Alicia Keys, U2, Hikaru Utada, Mr.Children, Edyta Gorniak.

As a teenager, Fitzmaurice moved from Dublin to London, where he began working at Sarm Studios with producer Trevor Horn and mixer Julian Mendelsohn. He later moved to New York where he worked on records by Jodeci, Eric Clapton and young upcoming artists, including Timbaland and Missy Elliott.

Since becoming a freelance mix engineer and producer, Fitzmaurice has won and been nominated for multiple Grammy Awards. Fitzmaurice co-produced and mixed the first ever Number One James Bond track and Oscar-winning song, "Writing's On The Wall". He also mixed Falling Slowly by The Frames, which won an Academy Award for Best Original Song at the 80th Academy Awards.

== Awards ==
- Seal - Kiss from a Rose - Record Of The Year - Grammy Winner
- U2 - All That You Can't Leave Behind - Best Rock Album - Grammy Winner
- Sam Smith - Stay with Me - Record Of The Year - Grammy Winner
- Sam Smith - In the Lonely Hour - Best Pop Album - Grammy Winner

== Songwriting and production credits ==
Title	Year	Artist	Album	Songwriter	Producer			
Title	Year	Artist	Album	Songwriter	Primary	Secondary	Additional	Vocal
"Ripped Inside"	1992	Tasmin Archer	Great Expectations		check			
"Deliver Me"	1996	The Beloved	X				check	
"That Concludes Our Broadcast Day"	1996	John Ottman	The Cable Guy OST		check			
"Steal My Body Home"	1999	The Frames	Pavement Tune EP		check			
"Look Back Now"	1999	The Frames	Pavement Tune EP		check			
"Plateau"	1999	The Frames	Dance the Devil		check			
"Neath the Beaches"	1999	The Frames	Dance the Devil		check			
"Dance the Devil Back into His Hole"	1999	The Frames	Dance the Devil		check			
"Taking the Hard Way Out"	1999	The Frames	Rent Day Blues EP		check			
"It's a Shame"	2000	Lee Griffiths	Northern Songs		check			
"Lay Lady Lay" (with Gemma Hayes)	2004	Magnet	Non-album single				check	
"On My Knees" (featuring Ghostface Killah)	2004	The 411	Between the Sheets				check	
"Easy Way Out"	2005	Charlotte Church	Tissues and Issues				check	
"Love Show"	2006	Skye	Mind How You Go				check	
"Les Mots Simples" (with Brett Anderson)	2008	Emmanuelle Seigner	Non-album single				check	
"So Called Summer"	2008	Team Waterpolo	Non-album single			check		
"Room 44"	2009	Team Waterpolo	Non-album single			check		
"New York"	2009	Paloma Faith	Do You Want the Truth or Something Beautiful?				check	
"Luv Ya"	2009	Paloma Faith	Non-album single		check			
"Coming Home"	2010	Lemar	The Hits				check	
"Ask Me to Stay"	2010	Olly Murs	Olly Murs				check	
"I Need a Dollar"	2011	Aloe Blacc	Good Things				check	
"I'm OK"	2011	Olly Murs	In Case You Didn't Know				check	
"Anywhere Else"	2011	Olly Murs	In Case You Didn't Know				check	
"Troubled Heart"	2012	Skye	Back to Life		check			
"Sign of Life"	2012	Skye	Back to Life		check			
"Featherlight"	2012	Skye	Back to Life		check			
"Nowhere"	2012	Skye	Back to Life		check			
"Little Bit Lost"	2012	Skye	Back to Life		check			
"We Fall Down"	2012	Skye	Back to Life		check			
"Every Little Lie"	2012	Skye	Back to Life		check			
"High Life"	2012	Skye	Back to Life		check			
"Dissolve"	2012	Skye	Back to Life		check			
"Bright Light"	2012	Skye	Back to Life		check			
"Lay Me Down"	2013	Sam Smith	In the Lonely Hour		check			
"Stay with Me"	2014	Sam Smith	In the Lonely Hour				check	
"Leave Your Lover"	2014	Sam Smith	In the Lonely Hour		check			
"I'm Not the Only One"	2014	Sam Smith	In the Lonely Hour		check			
"I've Told You Now"	2014	Sam Smith	In the Lonely Hour		check			
"Like I Can"	2014	Sam Smith	In the Lonely Hour		check			
"Make It to Me"	2014	Sam Smith	In the Lonely Hour		check			
"Heart on Fire"	2014	Indiana	No Romeo				check	
"Therapy"	2014	Mary J Blige	The London Sessions		check			
"Not Loving You"	2014	Mary J Blige	The London Sessions		check			
"Worth My Time"	2014	Mary J Blige	The London Sessions		check			
"Grow"	2015	Frances	Things I've Never Said		check			
"Writing's on the Wall"	2015	Sam Smith	Non-album single		check			
"Let It Out"	2015	Frances	Things I've Never Said		check			
"Sat Sail"	2015	Frances	Let It Out EP		check			
"Drowning Shadows"	2015	Sam Smith	In the Lonely Hour: Drowning Shadows Edition		check			
"Love Is a Losing Game"	2015	Sam Smith	In the Lonely Hour: Drowning Shadows Edition		check			
"Omen" (Acoustic)	2015	Sam Smith	In the Lonely Hour: Drowning Shadows Edition		check			
"Make It on My Own"	2016	Eliza and the Bear	Eliza and the Bear		check			
"Light It Up"	2016	Eliza and the Bear	Eliza and the Bear		check			
"It Gets Cold"	2016	Eliza and the Bear	Eliza and the Bear		check			
"Brother's Boat"	2016	Eliza and the Bear	Eliza and the Bear		check			
"Talk"	2016	Eliza and the Bear	Eliza and the Bear		check			
"Don't Worry About Me"	2016	Frances	Things I've Never Said		check			
"Say It Again"	2016	Frances	Things I've Never Said				check	
"Under Our Feet"	2017	Frances	Things I've Never Said		check			
"What is Love?"	2017	Frances	Fifty Shades Darker OST		check			
"Love Me Again"	2017	Frances	Things I've Never Said		check			
"Drifting"	2017	Frances	Things I've Never Said		check			
"Cloud 9"	2017	Frances	Things I've Never Said		check			
"Sublime"	2017	Frances	Things I've Never Said		check			
"The Last Word"	2017	Frances	Things I've Never Said		check			
"It Isn't Like You"	2017	Frances	Things I've Never Said		check			
"Cry Like Me"	2017	Frances	Things I've Never Said		check			
"The Smallest Thing"	2017	Frances	Things I've Never Said		check			
"Too Good at Goodbyes"	2017	Sam Smith	The Thrill of It All		check			
"Say It First"	2017	Sam Smith	The Thrill of It All		check			
"One Last Song"	2017	Sam Smith	The Thrill of It All		check			
"Midnight Train"	2017	Sam Smith	The Thrill of It All		check			
"Burning"	2017	Sam Smith	The Thrill of It All		check			
"Him"	2017	Sam Smith	The Thrill of It All		check			
"Baby, You Make Me Crazy"	2017	Sam Smith	The Thrill of It All		check			
"No Peace" (featuring Yebba)	2017	Sam Smith	The Thrill of It All		check			
"Pray"	2017	Sam Smith	The Thrill of It All		check			
"Nothing Left for You"	2017	Sam Smith	The Thrill of It All		check			
"The Thrill of It All"	2017	Sam Smith	The Thrill of It All		check			
"Scars"	2017	Sam Smith	The Thrill of It All				check	
"One Day at a Time"	2017	Sam Smith	The Thrill of It All		check			
"Daniel"	2018	Sam Smith	Revamp & Restoration		check			
"Depend on It"	2018	Liam Payne	First Time EP		check			
