= Diva Boy =

- "Film Soundtrack" version cover

Studio album by Sam Smith
- Released: 4 January 2019
- Recorded: 2008
- Length: 46:18
- Labels: Venus & Mars Music; Orestes Music Publishing

Sam Smith chronology
The Thrill of It All (2017)	Diva Boy (2019)	Love Goes (2020)

Singles from Diva Boy
- 1. "Momentarily Mine" Released: 4 August 2016; 2. "All This Madness" Released: 21 April 2020

Diva Boy is an unauthorized studio album released on 4 January 2019, featuring songs recorded by the English singer-songwriter Sam Smith in 2008, when they were 16 years old. Smith and their first record label Venus & Mars Music parted ways in 2010 and the singer did not have creative control over their own music. The album was released without Smith's approval. It includes songs written mainly by John Conlon, Victoria Hemmings and William John Pearce. Two versions of the album were released, one with 10 tracks, and the "Film Soundtrack" version with 15 songs.

== Background ==
In 2008, at the age of 16, Smith had signed a deal with Venus & Mars Music, a small UK independent label and was given to record songs by songwriting team of Victoria Hemmings, William John Pearce and John Conlon, who previously performed together as Lovatux. The first of Smith's recordings to see the light of the day would be "Bad Day All Week", a song written in mid '90s, which appeared as the B-side on Lovatux's 1996 single, "Something". Ahead of its scheduled release as a single, the decision was made to create a series of dance and club mixes of the song. The single was released on 18 August 2008 with remixes by Kinky Roland and Per QX. A music video was also released but the song failed to make much of an impact on the main charts. However, the remixes gain some traction on a couple of club charts and Venus & Mars Music dusted down more songs from Hemmings, Pearce and Conlon. Smith recorded "A Little Melancholy", "Show a Little Mercy" and the song that would eventually become the planned album's title track, "Time Won't Wait". They also recorded "Momentarily Mine", a ballad co-written by Lindsey Thompson.

In 2009, Venus & Mars Music released another single in the United Kingdom, "When It's Alright". While it was a pop-soul track in its original form, "When It's Alright" had received remix treatment by Kinky Roland, Per Qx and Kid Massive, and was serviced to club DJs in February. The remixes transformed the song into a deep house club track. While "When It's Alright" hadn't quite broken into the mainstream, it was gaining positive reviews. Eventually, a German dance label Kosmo Records approached Venus & Mars Music and signed a worldwide license deal for the track, as well as taking an option to remix the whole of Smith's album for other territories when it was eventually released. "When It's Alright" was commercially released on 2 April 2009 with new remixes by German DJ and producer, Tom Novy. The track made a strong showing on the dance charts but the single, just like "Bad Day All Week", had experienced sluggish sales in the UK.

Smith had little interest in becoming predominantly a dance act. They had a passion for soul music and their dream was to sing powerful ballads and the type of uptempo pop/soul numbers Whitney Houston had made in the 1980s and 1990s, all of which seemed a long way from the tracks they had so far completed as part of the Time Won't Wait project. In 2010, Smith decided to end their association with Venus & Mars Music and walked away from the deal.

== The Lost Tapes – Remixed ==
The deal Kosmo Records made with Venus & Mars Music gave them the right to remix any of the tracks from Smith's unreleased album. It was inevitable that they would surface once Smith became a marketable name. In 2013, "When It's Alright" was completely transformed by Juun, DJ and producer duo from Germany and re-released in 2013 and again in 2014, becoming a small club hit in Germany and across much of Europe. In 2015, the piano ballad "Momentarily Mine" was radically transformed to a house track by Freddy Verano, a German-Colombian DJ and producer. Now simply titled "Moments", this song had a similarly widespread release and inspired Kosmo Records to re-examine the entire Time Won't Wait project. Ultimately, Kosmo Records commissioned remixes for 10 tracks and named the album The Lost Tapes – Remixed. It was released on 15 May 2015.

== Release ==
On 4 August 2016, UK label Flipbook Music released the original 2008 version of "Momentarily Mine", and announced the release of the whole album with Smith's pre-fame early recordings for September 2016, without Smith's approval. Titled Diva Boy, the album was not released at that time despite the announcement, as Smith filed a lawsuit against their former record label. However, on 4 January 2019, the album was released in two versions, one with 10 tracks, and the "Film Soundtrack" version with 15 songs. "All This Madness", produced by Anthony Wade aka Dr Voice, was released as the last single on 21 April 2020.

== Track listing ==
All tracks written by John Conlon, Victoria Hemmings and William John Pearce, except "Moments" also written by Lindsey Thompson.

No.	Title	Length
1.	"A Little Melancholy"	3:02
2.	"All This Madness"	4:24
3.	"All We Need Is Love^{[a]}"	3:05
4.	"Bad Day All Week"	3:16
5.	"Hold On Tight^{[a]}"	1:24
6.	"Impossible^{[a]}"	3:42
7.	"Little Tin Buddhas"	3:10
8.	"Momentarily Mine"	2:38
9.	"Out of Our Heads"	2:57
10.	"Roses Are Red^{[a]}"	1:41
11.	"Shooting Star^{[a]}"	2:33
12.	"Show a Little Mercy"	3:48
13.	"So Much More to Lose"	3:55
14.	"Time Won't Wait"	3:19
15.	"When It's Alright"	3:24
Total length:		46:18

Notes

- ^{^[a]} "All We Need Is Love", "Hold On Tight", "Impossible", "Roses Are Red" and "Shooting Star" are featured on the "Film Soundtrack" version of Diva Boy only.

== Live at the Spectator ==
At the same time, on 4 January 2019, an unauthorized live album was released by Orestes Music Publishing, Live at the Spectator. It includes six songs from Diva Boy and two covers, Whitney Houston' s "My Love Is Your Love" and Rihanna's "Umbrella", performed during a live music event hosted by The Spectator.
