= The Lost Tapes – Remixed =

Remix album by Sam Smith
- Released: 15 May 2015
- Recorded: 2008
- Length: 37:20
- Label: Kosmo

Sam Smith chronology
In the Lonely Hour (2014)	The Lost Tapes – Remixed (2015)	The Thrill of It All (2017)

Singles from The Lost Tapes – Remixed
- 1. "When It's Alright" Released: 9 August 2013; 2. "Moments" Released: 8 May 2015

The Lost Tapes – Remixed is an unauthorized remix album released by Kosmo Records on 15 May 2015, featuring remixes of songs recorded by the English singer-songwriter Sam Smith in 2008, when they were 16 years old. The album was released without Smith's approval.

== Background ==
In 2008, Smith had signed a deal with Venus & Mars Music, a small UK independent label and was given to record songs by songwriting team of Victoria Hemmings, William John Pearce and John Conlon. The first of Smith's recordings to see the light of the day would be "Bad Day All Week", a song written in mid '90s. Ahead of its scheduled release as a single, the decision was made to create a series of dance and club mixes of the song. The single was released in August 2008 with remixes by Kinky Roland and Per QX. A music video was also released but the song failed to make much of an impact on the main charts. However, the remixes gained some traction on a couple of club charts and Venus & Mars Music dusted down more songs from Hemmings, Pearce and Conlon. Smith recorded "A Little Melancholy", "Show a Little Mercy" and the song that would eventually become the planned album's title track, "Time Won't Wait". They also recorded "Momentarily Mine", a ballad co-written by Lindsey Thompson.

In February 2009, Venus & Mars Music released another single in the United Kingdom, "When It's Alright". While it was a pop-soul track in its original form, "When It's Alright" had received remix treatment by Kinky Roland, Per Qx and Kid Massive, and was serviced to club DJs. The remixes transformed the song into a deep house club track. While "When It's Alright" hadn't quite broken into the mainstream, it was gaining positive reviews. Eventually, a German dance label Kosmo Records approached Venus & Mars Music and signed a worldwide license deal for the track, as well as taking an option to remix the whole of Smith's album for other territories when it was eventually released. "When It's Alright" was re-promoted in April 2009 with new remixes by German producer, Tom Novy. The track made a strong showing on the dance charts but the single, just like "Bad Day All Week", had experienced sluggish sales in the UK.

Smith had little interest in becoming predominantly a dance act. They had a passion for soul music and their dream was to sing powerful ballads and the type of uptempo pop/soul numbers Whitney Houston had made in the 1980s and 1990s, all of which seemed a long way from the tracks they had so far completed as part of the Time Won't Wait project. In 2010, Smith decided to end their association with Venus & Mars Music and walked away from the deal. However, as the deal Kosmo Records made with Venus & Mars Music gave them the right to remix any of the tracks from Smith's unreleased album, it was inevitable that they would surface once they became a marketable name.

== Release ==
In 2013, "When It's Alright", now completely transformed and credited to Juun featuring Sam Smith, was re-released and became a small club hit in Germany and across much of Europe. In 2015, "Momentarily Mine" – the piano ballad emerged, now simply titled "Moments", under the name Freddy Verano featuring Sam Smith. Radically transformed, this song had a similarly widespread release and inspired Kosmo Records to re-examine the entire Time Won't Wait project. Ultimately they commissioned remixes for every track on the album and re-named the collection The Lost Tapes – Remixed. It was released in May 2015. In August 2016, UK label Flipbook Music released the original 2008 version of "Momentarily Mine", and announced the release of the whole album with Smith's pre-fame early recordings for September 2016. Titled Diva Boy, the album was not released at that time despite the announcement, as Smith filed a lawsuit against his former record label. Eventually, it was released on 4 January 2019.

== Track listing ==
All tracks written by John Conlon, Victoria Hemmings, and William John Pearce, except "Moments" also written by Lindsey Thompson.

No.	Title	Producer(s)	Length
1.	"All This Madness" (Genji Yoshida Remix Edit)	Genji Yoshida; Adrian Bahil	3:39
2.	"When It's Alright^{[a]}" (Juun feat. Sam Smith) (Radio Edit)	Juun	3:16
3.	"Little Tin Buddhas" (Berger & Shaqiri Remix)	Berger & Shaqiri	3:31
4.	"Time Won't Wait" (TAI Remix)	TAI	3:34
5.	"Moments" (Freddy Verano feat. Sam Smith) (Radio Edit)	Freddy Verano	3:21
6.	"Out of Our Heads" (Tom Bruckner Remix)	Tomcraft	5:26
7.	"Bad Day All Week" (Adrian Bahil Remix)	Bahil; Yoshida	4:05
8.	"So Much More to Lose" (Pooker Remix)	Pooker	3:53
9.	"Show a Little Mercy" (TAI Remix)	TAI	3:13
10.	"A Little Melancholy" (Arbitraire Remix)	Bahil; Yoshida	3:22
Total length:			37:20

Notes

- ^{^[a]} "When It's Alright" is included on the CD version of the album only.

== Release history ==
Region	Date	Label	Format	Ref.
Various	15 May 2015	Kosmo	Digital download	
Various	29 May 2015	Kosmo	CD	

== See also ==
- Diva Boy
