= Solo Dancing =

2014 single by Indiana

Single by Indiana

from the album No Romeo
- Released: 18 April 2014
- Length: 4:14
- Label: Sony
- Songwriter(s): Henson, John Beck, Steve Chrisanthou
- Producer(s): John Beck, Steve Chrisanthou, Darren Heelis

Indiana singles chronology
"Mess Around" (2013)	"Solo Dancing" (2014)	"Heart on Fire" (2014)

"Solo Dancing" is a song by British singer-songwriter Indiana. The song was released in the United Kingdom on 18 April 2014 as a digital download from her debut studio album No Romeo (2015). The song peaked at number 14 on the UK Singles Chart and number 85 on the Irish Singles Chart.

== Music video ==
A music video to accompany the release of "Solo Dancing" was first released onto YouTube on 17 February 2014 at a total length of three minutes and thirty-four seconds. As of October 2016, the music video has over 2 million views on Youtube, making it her most viewed video.

== Track listing ==
Digital download
No.	Title	Length
1.	"Solo Dancing"	4:14
2.	"Solo Dancing" (Chris Lake Remix)	4:37
3.	"Solo Dancing" (Joe Goddard Remix)	7:44
4.	"Solo Dancing" (KAOS Remix)	4:00

== Chart performance ==
On 23 April 2014 the song was at number 9 on The Official Chart Update in the UK. On 24 April 2014 the song entered the Irish Singles Chart at number 93, peaking to number 85. On 27 April 2014 the song entered the UK Singles Chart at number 14.

== Charts ==
Chart (2014)	Peak position
Ireland (IRMA)	85
Scotland (OCC)	9
UK Singles (OCC)	14

== Release history ==
Region	Date	Format	Label
United Kingdom	18 April 2014	Digital download	Sony Music Entertainment
