= Things I've Never Said =

Studio album by Frances
- Released: 17 March 2017
- Recorded: 2014–17
- Genre: Indie pop; soul
- Length: 40:42
- Label: Cookie; Capitol
- Producer: Frances (exec.); Steve Fitzmaurice (also exec.); Howard Lawrence; RITUAL; Mojam; Two Inch Punch; Craze & Hoax; Dave McCracken; Mark Ralph

Frances chronology
Let It Out EP (2015)	Things I've Never Said (2017)

Singles from Things I've Never Said
- 1. "Grow" Released: 10 July 2015; 2. "Let It Out" Released: 7 October 2015; 3. "Borrowed Time" Released: 20 November 2015; 4. "Don't Worry About Me" Released: 29 April 2016; 5. "Say It Again" Released: 10 August 2016; 6. "Under Our Feet" Released: 19 January 2017; 7. "No Matter" Released: 27 January 2017

Things I've Never Said is the debut studio album by British indie pop musician Frances. It was released on 17 March 2017 through Capitol Records.

== Track listing ==
Standard edition
No.	Title	Writer(s)	Producer(s)	Length
1.	"Don't Worry About Me"	Sophie "Frances" Cooke	Fitzmaurice; Frances^{[a]}	3:41
2.	"Love Me Again"	Cooke; Ollie Green	Fitzmaurice; Frances^{[a]}	2:47
3.	"Drifting"	Cooke	Fitzmaurice; Frances^{[a]}; Two Inch Punch^{[b]}	3:42
4.	"Cloud 9"	Cooke; James Napier	Fitzmaurice	3:26
5.	"Let It Out"	Cooke; Jonny Lattimer	Fitzmaurice; Frances^{[a]}; Two Inch Punch^{[a]}	3:52
6.	"No Matter"	Cooke; Dario Darnell; Mustafa Omer; Sam Vouga; James Murray	Mojam	3:28
7.	"Under Our Feet"	Cooke; Dan McDougall; Rachel Furner	Fitzmaurice; Frances^{[a]}; Dave McCracken^{[b]}; Mark Ralph^{[b]}	4:52
8.	"Grow"	Cooke; Alexander James Davies; Benjamin Francis Leftwich	Fitzmaurice; Frances^{[a]}	3:59
9.	"Say It Again"	Cooke; Greg Kurstin	Kurstin; Fitzmaurice^{[b]}; Craze & Hoax^{[b]}	3:17
10.	"Sublime"	Cooke	Fitzmaurice; Frances^{[a]}	4:11
11.	"The Last Word"	Cooke	Fitzmaurice; Frances^{[a]}	3:27
Total length:				40:42

Deluxe version bonus tracks
No.	Title	Writer(s)	Producer(s)	Length
12.	"When It Comes to Us" (featuring RITUAL)	Cooke; Adam Midgely; Gerard O'Connell; Tommy Baxter	RITUAL	4:09
13.	"It Isn't Like You"	Cooke; Napier	Fitzmaurice; Frances^{[a]}	4:36
14.	"Cry Like Me"	Cooke	Fitzmaurice; Frances	3:11
15.	"Borrowed Time"	Cooke; Howard Lawrence	Lawrence; Frances	3:18
16.	"The Smallest Thing"	Cooke; Simon Aldred	Fitzmaurice; Frances^{[a]}	3:32
Total length:				59:28

Notes

- ^{^[a]} signifies a co-producer
- ^{^[b]} signifies an additional producer

== Charts ==
Chart (2017)	Peak position
Belgian Albums (Ultratop Flanders)	33
Belgian Albums (Ultratop Wallonia)	90
Scottish Albums (OCC)	58
UK Albums (OCC)	43
