= Elviin =

British songwriter and artist manager

Elvin Smith also known as Elviin, is a British songwriter and artist manager from South London.

He signed to Virgin Records in 2007, ten months after learning to play the piano, and toured with Jack Peñate shortly after. In 2008, he recorded his debut album, Made Of, with record producer Tony Hoffer at The Sound Factory, Los Angeles. He was the main support act for Adele on her first major UK tour.

In 2012, he went into music management shortly after discovering Sam Smith at a show in London. Elvin also co-wrote one of Smith's UK number 1 singles, "Lay Me Down", with Jimmy Napes, from Smith's debut album, In The Lonely Hour.
