= Pray (Sam Smith song) =

2018 single by Sam Smith featuring Logic

Promotional single by Sam Smith

from the album The Thrill of It All
- Released: 6 October 2017
- Genre: R&B; gospel
- Length: 3:41
- Label: Capitol
- Songwriters: Larrance Dopson; Darryl Pearson; Sam Smith; Timothy Mosley; Jose Velazquez; James Napier
- Producers: Timbaland; Steve Fitzmaurice; Jimmy Napes

"Pray" is a song by the English singer and songwriter Sam Smith. It was written by Smith, Larrance Dopson, Darryl Pearson, Timbaland, Jose Valasquez and Jimmy Napes, with production handled by Timbaland, Napes and Steve Fitzmaurice. The song was released on 6 October 2017 through Capitol Records, as a promotional single from Smith's second studio album, The Thrill of It All (2017). A new version of the song featuring American rapper Logic was released as the third single from the album on 29 March 2018.

== Background ==
On 4 October 2017, Smith teased the song on social media by posting a video, alongside the song's release date. They tweeted shortly after the song's release: "I hope you love 'Pray', I hope it becomes your friend in those deep dark nights of confusion and loneliness. Love you all so much." They explained to Billboard that "Pray" was prompted by time spent in Iraq with the charity War Child, saying: "I spent five days in Mosul and came back embarrassed that I had known so little about the world and other people's lives. I went back to that great Nina Simone quote, that it is important to speak about the times you live in. I hadn't done that; I'd just written a bunch of songs about love. So I wanted to write about how I'm now starting to open my eyes, at 25, to what is going on in the rest of the world, and that it's not always pretty."

== Critical reception ==
Daniel Kreps of Rolling Stone called "Pray" a "gospel-inspired track" that is "bolstered by a textbook but understated Timbaland beat". Winston Cook-Wilson of Spin deemed it a "half spare R&B, half gospel shuffle downbeat track". Nick Reilly of NME wrote: "The soul-infused track features Timbaland on production duties, and comes complete with powerful choral backing." Alex Ross of Vice regarded it as "a soulful downtempo ballad that showcases Smith's vocal versatility and conjures a little more drama", writing that it is more interesting when compared with "Too Good at Goodbyes". Lauren O'Neill of the same publication wrote that the song "pretty much follows the structure" of "Too Good at Goodbyes", making Smith's voice "predictable", which he called "a shame when there's so much to work with". Mike Wass of Idolator wrote that the song "introduces aspects of hip-hop into [Smith's] sound and finds [them] singing about world issues".

== Live performances ==
On 7 October 2017, Smith performed "Pray" and "Too Good at Goodbyes" on Saturday Night Live.

== Formats and track listings ==
Digital download
No.	Title	Length
1.	"Pray"	3:41

Digital download
No.	Title	Length
1.	"Pray" (MK mix)	6:22

== Credits and personnel ==
Credits adapted from Tidal.

- Sam Smith – songwriting, vocals
- Larrance Dopson – songwriting
- Darryl Pearson – songwriting, guitar
- Timbaland – songwriting, production, drum programming, drums, percussion, programming
- Jose Valasquez – songwriting
- Jimmy Napes – songwriting, production
- Steve Fitzmaurice – production, engineering, mixing
- Bob Ludwig – mastering engineering
- Gus Pirelli – engineering
- Darren Heelis – engineering, drum programming
- Jodi Milliner – bass guitar
- LaDonna Harley-Peters – background vocals
- Vula Malinga – background vocals
- The LJ Singers – background vocals
- Vicky Akintola – background vocals
- Patrick Linton – background vocals
- Isabel Grundy Gracefield – assistant recording engineering
- Steph Marziano – assistant recording engineering
- John Prestage – assistant recording engineering
- Will Purton – assistant recording engineering
- Darren Heelis – engineering, drum programming
- Earl Harvin – drums, percussion
- Ben Jones – guitar
- Reuben James – organ
- Lawrence Dopson – piano
- Simon Hale – string arranging
- Richard George – strings
- Bruce White – strings
- Everton Nelson – strings
- Ian Burdge – strings
- Lawrence Johnson – vocal arranging

== Charts ==
Chart performance for "Pray" by Sam Smith
Chart (2017–2018)	Peak position
Australia (ARIA)	41
Austria (Ö3 Austria Top 40)	71
Belgium (Ultratip Bubbling Under Flanders)	7
Belgium (Ultratip Bubbling Under Wallonia)	5
Canada Hot 100 (Billboard)	44
Czech Republic Singles Digital (ČNS IFPI)	40
Denmark (Tracklisten)	38
France (SNEP)	126
Ireland (IRMA)	29
Italy (FIMI)	98
Latvia (DigiTop100)	69
Netherlands (Dutch Top 40 Tipparade)	10
Netherlands (Single Top 100)	47
New Zealand (Recorded Music NZ)	32
Philippines (Philippine Hot 100)	78
Portugal (AFP)	50
Scottish Singles Sales (Official Charts)	34
Slovakia Singles Digital (ČNS IFPI)	31
Sweden (Sverigetopplistan)	42
Switzerland (Schweizer Hitparade)	27
UK Singles (Official Charts)	26
US Billboard Hot 100	55
US Adult Contemporary (Billboard)	23
US Pop Airplay (Billboard)	34

== Certifications ==
Region	Certification	Certified units/sales
Australia (ARIA)	Platinum	70,000^{‡}
Brazil (Pro-Música Brasil)	2× Platinum	120,000^{‡}
Canada (Music Canada)	2× Platinum	160,000^{‡}
Denmark (IFPI Danmark)	Gold	45,000^{‡}
Mexico (AMPROFON)	Gold	30,000^{‡}
Norway (IFPI Norway)	Platinum	60,000^{‡}
Poland (ZPAV)	Platinum	20,000^{‡}
Portugal (AFP)	Gold	5,000^{‡}
United Kingdom (BPI)	Gold	400,000^{‡}
United States (RIAA)	Platinum	1,000,000^{‡}
Streaming
Sweden (GLF)	Gold	4,000,000^{†}
^{‡} Sales+streaming figures based on certification alone.^{†} Streaming-only figures based on certification alone.

== Release history ==
Region	Date	Format	Version	Label	Ref.
Various	6 October 2017 (Note: Released as a promotional single preceding the album The Thrill of It All release.)	Digital download	Original	Capitol	
Various	27 April 2018	Digital download	MK mix	Capitol	

== Logic version ==
"Pray"

Single by Sam Smith featuring Logic

from the album The Thrill of It All
- Released: 29 March 2018
- Genre: R&B, gospel
- Length: 3:41
- Label: Capitol
- Songwriters: Larrance Dopson; Darryl Pearson; Sam Smith; Timothy Mosley; Jose Velazquez; Bobby Hall II(add.); James Napier
- Producers: Timbaland; Steve Fitzmaurice; Jimmy Napes

Sam Smith singles chronology
"One Last Song" (2017)	"Pray" (2018)	"Baby, You Make Me Crazy" (2018)

Logic singles chronology
"Everyday" (2018)	"Pray" (2018)	"Start Again" (2018)

Music video
- "Pray ft. Logic" on YouTube

On 29 March 2018, a remix of the song featuring American rapper Logic was re-released to digital download and streaming on 27 April 2018. It was also sent to contemporary hit radio formats in Australia, Italy and the United Kingdom as the third single from Smith's second studio album The Thrill of It All.

=== Music videos ===
The music video for "Pray" featuring Logic was released on 9 May 2018, directed by Joe Connor.

=== Track listings ===
Digital download
No.	Title	Length
1.	"Pray" (featuring Logic)	3:41

=== Charts ===
Chart (2018)	Peak position
Canadian Digital Song Sales (Billboard)	12
Netherlands (Single Tip)	19

=== Certifications ===
Region	Certification	Certified units/sales
New Zealand (RMNZ)	Platinum	30,000^{‡}
^{‡} Sales+streaming figures based on certification alone.

=== Release history ===
Region	Date	Format	Label	Ref.
Germany	29 March 2018	Contemporary hit radio; Digital download	Universal Music Germany; Capitol Records	
United Kingdom	29 March 2018	Radio premiere	Capitol Records	
Australia	30 March 2018	Contemporary hit radio	Universal Music Australia	
United Kingdom	13 April 2018	Contemporary hit radio	Capitol Records	
Italy	27 April 2018	Contemporary hit radio	Universal	
Various	27 April 2018	Digital download; streaming	Capitol Records	
