= Heart on Fire (Indiana song) =

Single by Indiana

from the album No Romeo
- Released: 24 August 2014
- Recorded: 2013
- Genre: Electronica
- Length: 4:00
- Label: Sony Music Entertainment
- Songwriters: Lauren Henson; Ben Ash

Indiana singles chronology
"Solo Dancing" (2014)	"Heart on Fire" (2014)

"Heart on Fire" is a song by British singer and songwriter Indiana. The song was released in the United Kingdom on 24 August 2014 as a digital download from her debut studio album No Romeo (2015). The song has peaked at number 89 on the UK Singles Chart.

== Music video ==
A music video to accompany the release of "Heart on Fire" was first released onto YouTube on 7 July 2014 at a total length of four minutes and nine seconds.

== Track listing ==
Digital download - Single
No.	Title	Length
1.	"Heart on Fire"	4:00

Digital download - Remixes
No.	Title	Length
1.	"Heart on Fire" (Grum Remix)	6:45
2.	"Heart on Fire" (Bobby Tank Remix)	4:08
3.	"Heart on Fire" (IYES Remix)	4:25
4.	"Ready for Your Love" (Live at BBC Radio 1)	3:31

== Chart performance ==
=== Weekly charts ===
Chart (2014)	Peak position
UK Singles (Official Charts)	89

== Release history ==
Region	Date	Format	Label
United Kingdom	24 August 2014	Digital download	Sony Music Entertainment
