= Indiana (singer) =

British musician

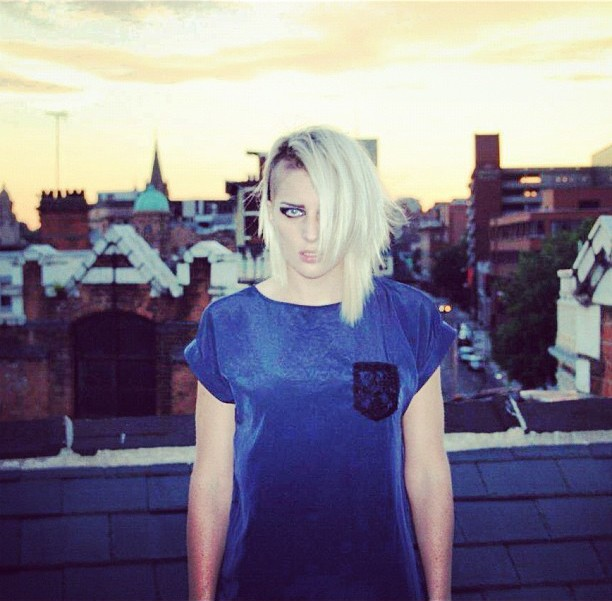
- Henson in 2014

Background information
- Born: Lauren Henson
- Origin: Loughborough, England
- Genres: Trip hop; electronica
- Occupations: Singer
- Instruments: Vocals; piano
- Years active: 2011–present
- Labels: Sony; Epic

Lauren Henson, better known by her stage name Indiana, is a British singer-songwriter from Loughborough. Her 2015 debut album, No Romeo, includes the UK top 20 single "Solo Dancing" (2014).

== Biography ==
Henson grew up in Loughborough, Leicestershire. She moved to Nottingham to live with her partner, with whom she has two children. She worked as a printer in a T-shirt boutique and runs a fashion label called Some Kind of Nature, which specialises in streetwear, with her partner and a mutual friend. The family had moved to Long Eaton in Derbyshire by 2015.

Henson began writing songs in 2010, after she taught herself to play piano using one that she was storing temporarily for her sister. She was approached by musician John Beck after she uploaded a cover of one of his compositions, "Gabriel", to the video sharing website YouTube. They wrote their first song together, "Blind as I Am", which she performed at her first gig in April 2012, at the semi-finals of the live music competition Future Sound of Nottingham. Henson took her stage name, Indiana, in memory of her late father, who was a fan of the Indiana Jones film series.

"Blind as I Am" was released as Indiana's debut single in November 2012, followed by "Bound" in February 2013, "Smoking Gun" in June 2013, and "Mess Around" in October 2013. Also in 2013, Indiana signed a record deal with Sony Music and played at the Splendour in Nottingham and Glastonbury music festivals, the latter on the BBC Introducing stage. She performed for Queen Elizabeth II during the monarch's visit to BBC Radio 1, singing a cover of David Bowie's "Heroes" with Irish band The Script.

Indiana's fifth single, "Solo Dancing", became her breakthrough release, amassing substantial attention from music blogs and inclusion on Time magazine's mid-year "Singles of 2014" list. Released commercially in April 2014, it reached number 14 on the UK Singles Chart. "Heart on Fire", its follow-up (in August 2014), was less successful, peaking at number 89 in the UK. On 4 September 2014, Indiana appeared on BBC Radio 1's Innuendo Bingo. and appeared again on 6 January 2015. Indiana's debut album, No Romeo, was released in February 2015 and reached number 17 on the UK Albums Chart. John Beck co-wrote and produced the majority of No Romeo, which also features contributions from Joel Pott and Jesse Shatkin. Indiana embarked on a UK tour in May 2015 and performed for the second time at the Glastonbury Festival the following month.

In July 2015, Indiana released an EP entitled State of Play, which features her track "Blind as I Am" alongside cover versions of George Michael's "Careless Whisper", Dolly Parton's "Jolene", and Blu Cantrell's "Breathe". In November, she was featured on the single "Dance on My Heart" by producers Mark Knight and Adrian Hour.

In 2018, Indiana was featured on the title track for Gunship's "Dark All Day" album, also featuring prolific 80's saxophone sensation Tim Cappello.

=== Topless photo controversy ===
In September 2018, Indiana sparked controversy when she released topless photos of herself, her hands over her breasts, taken in front of a World War I memorial plaque in a London church. She later explained that she did not realise it was a war memorial when the photos were taken, and defended her actions by saying, "Pretty sure those boys that gave their lives for this country would enjoy a casual bit of side-boob."

== Artistry ==
Indiana describes her music as "menacing and emotional electronica with 80s-inspired synths and haunting vocals". She cites James Blake, Gary Numan, Frank Ocean, Portishead, The Weeknd, and the xx as her biggest musical influences. She has mentioned the soundtrack of the 2011 film Drive as being a major inspiration for her work.

== Discography ==
=== Studio albums ===
Title	Details	Peak chart positions	
Title	Details	UK	SCO
No Romeo	Released: 16 January 2015; Label: Epic; Formats: CD, LP, digital download	17	22
Not Girlfriend Material	Released: 24 August 2018; Label: Audio Network Ltd; Format: Digital download	—	—

=== Singles ===
Year	Title	Peak chart positions			Album
Year	Title	UK	IRE	SCO	Album
2012	"Blind as I Am"	—	—	—	No Romeo
2013	"Bound"	—	—	—	No Romeo
2013	"Smoking Gun"	—	—	—	No Romeo
2013	"Mess Around"	—	—	—	No Romeo
2014	"Solo Dancing"	14	85	9	No Romeo
2014	"Heart on Fire"	89	—	60	No Romeo
2014	"Only the Lonely"	—	—	—	No Romeo
2017	"Bad Luck"	—	—	—	Not Girlfriend Material
2018	"Paper Cut"	—	—	—	Not Girlfriend Material
2018	"I Like Drinking"	—	—	—	Not Girlfriend Material
2019	"Caroline"	—	—	—	Non-album single
2019	"No Strings"	—	—	—	Non-album single
2019	"Sweet Things"	—	—	—	Non-album single
2019	"Tropical Daze"	—	—	—	Non-album single
2019	"Break the Habit"	—	—	—	Non-album single
2020	"Physical"	—	—	—	Non-album single
2020	"Small Town Girl"	—	—	—	Non-album single
2021	"Isolation"	—	—	—	Non-album single
2021	"Summer Lovin' Druggie"	—	—	—	Non-album single
"—" denotes a single that did not chart or was not released.
