= No Romeo =

Studio album by Indiana
- Released: 16 January 2015
- Recorded: 2012–2014
- Genre: Synth-pop
- Label: Epic
- Producers: John Beck; Joel Pott; Jesse Shatkin

Indiana chronology
No Romeo (2015)	Not Girlfriend Material (2018)

Singles from No Romeo
- 1. "Bound" Released: 26 January 2013; 2. "Smoking Gun" Released: 1 July 2013; 3. "Mess Around" Released: 18 October 2013; 4. "Solo Dancing" Released: 18 April 2014; 5. "Heart on Fire" Released: 24 August 2014; 6. "Only The Lonely" Released: 16 December 2014

No Romeo is the debut studio album by English singer Lauren Henson, known professionally as Indiana. It was originally scheduled to be released on 1 September 2014, but has been subject to several pushbacks and was eventually released on 16 January 2015. The album spawned six singles: "Bound", "Smoking Gun", "Mess Around", "Solo Dancing" and "Heart on Fire". No Romeo was produced mainly by Henson's writing partner, John Beck.

The album debuted at number 17 on the UK Albums Chart, selling 3,646 copies in its first week.

== Track listing ==
No.	Title	Writer(s)	Producer(s)	Length
1.	"Never Born"	Lauren Henson; John Beck	Beck	4:45
2.	"Solo Dancing"	Henson; Beck; Steve Chrisanthou		4:14
3.	"Play Dead"	Henson; Fransisca Hall; Jesse Shatkin	Shatkin	4:27
4.	"Heart on Fire"	Henson; Ben Ash		4:00
5.	"Blind as I Am"	Henson; Beck	Beck	3:41
6.	"Jack"	Henson; Joel Pott	Pott	3:28
7.	"New Heart"	Henson; Beck	Beck	3:03
8.	"Bound"	Henson; Beck	Beck	3:38
9.	"No Romeo"	Henson; Beck	Beck	3:26
10.	"Calibrated Love"	Henson; Ash		3:43
11.	"Shadow Flash"	Henson; Beck	Beck	4:07
12.	"Only the Lonely"	Henson; Hall; Shatkin	Shatkin	3:41
13.	"Mess Around"	Henson; Beck	Beck	5:26

Deluxe edition bonus tracks
No.	Title	Writer(s)	Producer(s)	Length
14.	"Swim Good"	Christopher Francis Ocean; Waynne Nugent; Cooper Sebastian; Kevin Risto		4:33
15.	"Go Fast"	Henson; Beck	Beck	4:29
16.	"Erase"	Henson; Beck	Beck	3:38
17.	"Ink"	Henson; Beck	Beck	3:35
18.	"Smoking Gun"	Henson; Beck	Beck	3:40
19.	"Animal"	Henson; Beck	Beck	3:47

== Charts ==
Chart (2015)	Peak position
Scottish Albums (Official Charts)	22
UK Albums (Official Charts)	17

== Release history ==
Region	Date	Format	Edition	Label	Ref.
Australia	16 January 2015	CD	Deluxe	Sony	
Germany	16 January 2015	CD	Standard	Sony	
Australia	30 January 2015	Digital download	Standard; deluxe	Sony	
Germany	30 January 2015	CD; digital download	Deluxe	Sony	
Germany	30 January 2015	LP	Standard	Sony	
Ireland	30 January 2015	Digital download	Standard; deluxe	Epic	
United Kingdom	2 February 2015	CD; digital download	Standard; deluxe	Epic	
United Kingdom	2 February 2015	LP	Standard	Epic	
