= The Thrill of It All (Sam Smith album) =

2017 studio album by Sam Smith

Studio album by Sam Smith
- Released: 3 November 2017
- Studio: RAK (London)
- Genres: Soul; gospel; pop; R&B
- Length: 35:38
- Label: Capitol
- Producers: Steve Fitzmaurice (also exec.); Jimmy Napes (also exec.); Brendan Grieve; Malay; Tyler Johnson; StarGate; Emile Haynie; Timbaland

Sam Smith chronology
| The Lost Tapes – Remixed (2015) | The Thrill of It All (2017) | Diva Boy (2019) |

Singles from The Thrill of It All
- 1. "Too Good at Goodbyes" Released: 8 September 2017; 2. "One Last Song" Released: 3 November 2017; 3. "Pray" Released: 29 March 2018; 4. "Baby, You Make Me Crazy" Released: 29 June 2018

The Thrill of It All is the second studio album by the English singer and songwriter Sam Smith. It was released on 3 November 2017 through Capitol Records.

== Background ==
On 6 October 2017, Smith announced via Twitter that their second album, titled "The Thrill of It All", was to be released on 3 November 2017. It is Smith's second full album of material after their hugely successful debut album In the Lonely Hour (2014), which has sold 12 million copies worldwide.

Speaking to Billboard about the album, Smith said:

"I went through, like, this vortex, came out, I feel like I've rebuilt myself as a stronger thing and I'm just gonna go into the vortex again. [...] I wasn't trying to make a big pop record when I made this album. I was actually just trying to make something personal and like a diary."

== Singles ==
"Too Good at Goodbyes" was released as the album's lead single on 8 September 2017. It topped the UK Singles Chart and peaked No. 4 on the US Billboard Hot 100.

"One Last Song" was sent to radio in the United Kingdom on 3 November 2017, on the day of album release as its second single.

On 27 March 2018, Smith announced that "Pray" would serve as the third single, and would feature newly recorded guest vocals from American rapper Logic. The song was released on 29 March 2018.

"Baby, You Make Me Crazy" was released as the fourth single from the album on 29 June 2018.

=== Promotional singles ===
On 6 October 2017, Smith released "Pray", a gospel-tinged ballad in collaboration with Timbaland, prompted by time spent in Iraq with the charity War Child as a promotional single from the album. Another promotional single, "Burning", was released on 27 October 2017.

== Tour ==
Within releasing "Pray" as the promotional single on 6 October 2017, The Thrill of It All Tour was announced firstly revealing shows in Europe and North America. It began on 20 March 2018 in Sheffield, England, and concluded on 18 April 2019 in Cape Town, South Africa. In December 2018, Billboard concluded that after 94 shows, Smith grossed $86.1 million and sold 1.07 million tickets on The Thrill of It All Tour. It pushed their career total gross to $102.7 million from 1.4 million tickets sold.

== Critical reception ==
Professional ratings
Aggregate scores
| Source | Rating |
|---|---|
| AnyDecentMusic? | 5.9/10 |
| Metacritic | 72/100 |
Review scores
| Source | Rating |
| AllMusic | 3.5/5 stars |
| The Daily Telegraph | 4/5 stars |
| Entertainment Weekly | B |
| The Guardian | 3/5 stars |
| The Independent | 4/5 stars |
| NME | 4/5 stars |
| The Observer | 2/5 stars |
| Pitchfork | 5.8/10 |
| Rolling Stone | 4/5 stars |
| Slant Magazine | 3.5/5 stars |

The Thrill of It All received generally positive reviews from music critics. On Metacritic, which assigns a normalised rating out of 100 to reviews from mainstream publications, the album received an average score of 72 based on 16 reviews.

Neil McCormick of The Daily Telegraph gave the album four stars, and was highly positive about it and Smith's vocals, calling them "supernatural" and saying: "The Thrill of It All doesn't just wallow in love's misery, it practically drowns in the stuff. There's not much poetry in lines such as 'real love is never a waste of time' or 'there's no insurance to pay for the damage'. Yet it all hits home, because Smith makes every note sound like a matter of life and death. 'Him' is the album's centrepiece, a gospel drama addressed to a judgmental 'father', insisting on Smith's right to love whom he [sic] chooses. It is a kind of hymn to Him, and as the choir powers up it gains a righteous glory." Andy Gill from The Independent also gave a four-star review, and shared in the positivity about the album, remarking: "Smith's voice remains a thing of wonder throughout".

Will Hermes for Rolling Stone also gave a positive four-star review, and said: "Doubling down on his magnificent, gender-nonconforming voice while pushing his songcraft forward, Smith's second LP knights one of the mightiest, most expressive vocalists of his generation." In another positive review Nick Levine from NME compared Smith to Adele in his review of the album, stating: "Both have become enormously successful by singing emotional ballads that connect with huge numbers of people, and both are understandably reluctant to raise the tempo as a result. But like Adele's 25, this is an undeniably accomplished album that will, deservedly, shift a helluva lot of copies. AllMusic's Andy Kellman was positive too in his three and a half-star review, and opined: "this album maintains a consistency and intensity that places it slightly above the debut."

Some reviews were more negative. Though making it his album of the week and giving it three stars, Alexis Petridis from The Guardian was more mixed in his review, writing: "There's a certain power to "The Thrill of It All" but it could have been a much more potent album if they'd laid off the polish just a little." Kitty Empire from The Observer was less enthusiastic in a more negative two-star review, claiming Smith was "moping by numbers" like Adele, and surmised: "There is little drama here, just plenty of shorthand (sad pianos), a total absence of risk".

=== Accolades ===
| Publication | Accolade | Rank | Ref. |
|---|---|---|---|
| Rolling Stone | 50 Best Albums of 2017 | 10 | |
| Melty | Best Pop Albums of the Year | 10 | |

== Commercial performance ==
The Thrill of It All topped the UK Albums Chart in its first week of release with 97,328 combined units (consisting of 83,637 sales and 13,691 sales-equivalent streams), giving Smith their second number-one album in the nation after In the Lonely Hour (2014). It also had the fifth-largest opening there at the time for a 2017 album. The record fell to number two the next week with a combined total of 52,781 units. before returning to the top spot three weeks later and being displaced by Ed Sheeran's ÷ the following week. In Australia, the album opened at number two on the ARIA Albums Chart, becoming the singer's second album to enter at that position after In the Lonely Hour. It additionally debuted at number one on the Irish and Scottish charts.

The album debuted at number one on the US Billboard 200 with 237,000 album-equivalent units, including 185,000 pure sales, giving Smith their first chart-topper and highest opening sales in the United States. It also had the country's seventh-largest album opening of the year at the time. The Thrill of It All dropped to number two the following week, earning 66,000 album-equivalent units. It also became their first number one on the Canadian Albums Chart, debuting with 16,000 units, including 9,500 copies.

== Track listing ==
Standard edition
| No. | Title | Writer(s) | Producer(s) | Length |
|---|---|---|---|---|
| 1. | "Too Good at Goodbyes" | Sam Smith; James Napier; Mikkel S.Eriksen; Tor Erik Hermansen | Steve Fitzmaurice; Jimmy Napes; Stargate | 3:21 |
| 2. | "Say It First" | S. Smith; Napier; James Ho | Malay; Fitzmaurice; Napes | 4:07 |
| 3. | "One Last Song" | S. Smith; Napier; Tyler Johnson | Fitzmaurice; Napes; Johnson | 3:12 |
| 4. | "Midnight Train" | S. Smith; Napier; Ho | Fitzmaurice; Napes; Malay | 3:27 |
| 5. | "Burning" | S. Smith; Jason "Poo Bear" Boyd; Dominic Jordan; Jimmy Giannos | Fitzmaurice; Napes | 3:23 |
| 6. | "Him" | S. Smith; Brendan Grieve; Reuben James | Fitzmaurice; Grieve | 3:10 |
| 7. | "Baby, You Make Me Crazy" | S. Smith; Napier; Emile Haynie; Dennis Ronald Thomas; Woodrow Sparrow; Gene Redd Sr.; George Melvin Brown; Claydes Smith; Richard Westfield; Robert Bell; Robert Mickens; Ronald Bell | Fitzmaurice; Napes; Haynie | 3:27 |
| 8. | "No Peace" (featuring Yebba) | S. Smith; Napier; Abbey Smith | Fitzmaurice; Napes | 4:43 |
| 9. | "Palace" | S. Smith; Johnson; Camaron Ochs | Johnson | 3:07 |
| 10. | "Pray" | S. Smith; Napier; Timothy Mosley; Darryl Pearson; Larrance Dopson; Jose A. Valasquez | Timbaland; Fitzmaurice; Napes | 3:41 |
| Total length: | | | | 35:38 |

Special edition bonus tracks
| No. | Title | Writer(s) | Producer(s) | Length |
|---|---|---|---|---|
| 11. | "Nothing Left for You" | S. Smith; Napier | Fitzmaurice; Napes | 3:46 |
| 12. | "The Thrill of It All" | S. Smith; Grieve; James | Fitzmaurice; Napes; Grieve | 3:28 |
| 13. | "Scars" | S. Smith; Grieve | Grieve; Fitzmaurice^{[a]} | 3:03 |
| 14. | "One Day at a Time" | S. Smith; Simon Aldred | Fitzmaurice; Napes | 3:29 |
| Total length: | | | | 49:24 |

Target and Japanese bonus tracks
| No. | Title | Writer(s) | Length |
|---|---|---|---|
| 15. | "Leader of the Pack" | S. Smith; Grieve; Duncan Boyce | 2:38 |
| 16. | "Blind Eye" | S. Smith; Francis White | 1:48 |
| Total length: | | | 53:50 |

Notes

- ^{^[a]} signifies an additional producer
- Track 6, "Him", is stylised as "HIM".

== Personnel ==
Credits adapted from album's liner notes.

- Vicky Akintola – backing vocals (tracks 3, 4, 7, 10)
- Simon Aldred – electric guitar (track 14)
- Tom Archer – assistant engineer (tracks 1, 5, 8, 14)
- Ian Burdge – string leader (tracks 1–4, 6–8, 10–12)
- Cam – electric guitar and backing vocals (track 9)
- The Dap-Kings – horns (tracks 3, 4, 7)
- Henri Davies – assistant engineer (tracks 1, 5, 8, 14)
- Larrance "Rance" Dopson – piano (track 10)
- Steve Fitzmaurice – producer (tracks 1–8, 10–12, 14), additional production (13), engineer (1–8, 10–14), mixing (all tracks), additional drum programming (1, 3, 6), percussion (7)
- Richard George – string leader (tracks 1–4, 6–8, 10–12)
- Isabel Grundy Gracefield – assistant engineer (tracks 1–3, 5–8, 10–12, 14)
- Nathanael Graham – assistant engineer (track 3)
- Brendan Grieve – producer (tracks 6, 12, 13), engineer (6, 13), programming and celeste (6), drum programming (6, 13), electric guitars (13)
- Simon Hale – string arrangement and conducting (tracks 1–4, 6–8, 10–12)
- Earl Harvin – drums (tracks 1, 3–8, 10, 11), percussion (1, 3, 6, 11), tambourine (4), additional drums (2), additional percussion (10), additional drum programming (8)
- Emile Haynie – producer, programming, drums, percussion, and piano (track 7)
- Darren Heelis – engineer (tracks 1–8, 10–14), drum programming (6, 13), additional drum programming (1–4, 7, 8, 10, 11), additional Moog (2, 12), additional bass guitar (2)
- Reuben James – piano (tracks 1, 3, 5, 6, 8, 11, 12), Rhodes (1), Wurlitzer (7), organ (5–7, 10, 11, 13)
- Lawrence Johnson – additional choir vocal arrangements (tracks 1, 6, 7, 10, 11)
- Tyler Johnson – producer (tracks 3, 9); programming, drum loops, bass guitar, and electric guitar (3); piano and Moog (9)
- Ben Jones – guitars (tracks 1, 3, 6–8, 10, 11), acoustic guitar (5, 12–14), electric guitars (13), additional guitars (2)
- The LJ Singers – choir (tracks 1, 6, 7, 10, 11)
- Patrick Linton – backing vocals (tracks 3, 4, 7, 10)
- Nick Lobel – engineer (tracks 3, 9)
- Bob Ludwig – mastering (all tracks)
- Malay – producer, engineer, bass, and guitars (tracks 2, 4); programming and keyboards (2)
- Vula Malinga – backing vocals (tracks 3, 4, 7, 10)
- Steph Marziano – assistant engineer (tracks 1–8, 10–12, 14
- Tommy McLaughlin – assistant engineer (tracks 4, 7)
- Jodi Milliner – bass (tracks 1, 3, 5–8, 10–14), Moog bass (2, 3), additional drum programming (3)
- Jimmy Napes – producer (tracks 1–5, 7, 8, 10–12, 14), drums and organ (4), original percussion (1), drum programming (8), additional drum programming (11), piano (2), Middle 8 piano (3), organ (4), synth pads (8, 11)
- Everton Nelson – string leader (tracks 1–4, 6–8, 10–12)
- Darryl Pearson – guitar (track 10)
- LaDonna Harley Peters – backing vocals (tracks 3, 4, 7, 10)
- Gus Pirelli – engineer (tracks 1–8, 10–14), Moog bass (4)
- John Prestage – assistant engineer (tracks 1, 6, 7, 10, 11)
- Will Purton – assistant engineer (tracks 1–8, 10–12, 14), additional drum programming (7)
- Sam Smith – lead vocals (all tracks), backing vocals (1)
- Stargate – producers and original percussion (track 1)
- Timbaland – producer, drum programming, percussion, 808 bass, and synth pads (track 10)
- Lucy Whalley – string contractor (tracks 1–4, 6–8, 10–12)
- Bruce White – string leader (tracks 1–4, 6–8, 10–12)
- Yebba – featured vocals (track 8)

== Charts ==
=== Weekly charts ===
Weekly chart performance for The Thrill of It All
| Chart (2017–19) | Peak position |
|---|---|
| Australian Albums (ARIA) | 2 |
| Austrian Albums (Ö3 Austria) | 7 |
| Belgian Albums (Ultratop Flanders) | 1 |
| Belgian Albums (Ultratop Wallonia) | 11 |
| Canadian Albums (Billboard) | 1 |
| Croatian International Albums (HDU) | 3 |
| Czech Albums (ČNS IFPI) | 15 |
| Danish Albums (Hitlisten) | 1 |
| Dutch Albums (Album Top 100) | 1 |
| Finnish Albums (Suomen virallinen lista) | 10 |
| French Albums (SNEP) | 15 |
| German Albums (Offizielle Top 100) | 8 |
| Greek Albums (IFPI) | 8 |
| Irish Albums (IRMA) | 1 |
| Italian Albums (FIMI) | 4 |
| Japanese Albums (Billboard Japan) | 23 |
| Japanese Albums (Oricon) | 32 |
| Latvian Albums (LaIPA) | 4 |
| New Zealand Albums (RMNZ) | 1 |
| Norwegian Albums (VG-lista) | 1 |
| Polish Albums (ZPAV) | 10 |
| Portuguese Albums (AFP) | 3 |
| Scottish Albums (Official Charts) | 1 |
| Slovak Albums (ČNS IFPI) | 10 |
| South African Albums (RISA) | 9 |
| Spanish Albums (Promusicae) | 12 |
| Swedish Albums (Sverigetopplistan) | 1 |
| Swiss Albums (Schweizer Hitparade) | 3 |
| UK Albums (Official Charts) | 1 |
| US Billboard 200 | 1 |

=== Year-end charts ===
2017 year-end chart performance for The Thrill of It All
| Chart (2017) | Position |
|---|---|
| Australian Albums (ARIA) | 19 |
| Belgian Albums (Ultratop Flanders) | 51 |
| Belgian Albums (Ultratop Wallonia) | 138 |
| Danish Albums (Hitlisten) | 43 |
| Dutch Albums (MegaCharts) | 48 |
| French Albums (SNEP) | 119 |
| Icelandic Albums (Plötutíóindi) | 33 |
| Italian Albums (FIMI) | 89 |
| New Zealand Albums (RMNZ) | 27 |
| Swedish Albums (Sverigetopplistan) | 41 |
| Swiss Albums (Schweizer Hitparade) | 87 |
| UK Albums (OCC) | 3 |
| US Billboard 200 | 153 |

2018 year-end chart performance for The Thrill of It All
| Chart (2018) | Position |
|---|---|
| Australian Albums (ARIA) | 38 |
| Belgian Albums (Ultratop Flanders) | 47 |
| Belgian Albums (Ultratop Wallonia) | 170 |
| Canadian Albums (Billboard) | 29 |
| Danish Albums (Hitlisten) | 18 |
| Dutch Albums (MegaCharts) | 66 |
| French Albums (SNEP) | 164 |
| Icelandic Albums (Plötutíóindi) | 20 |
| Irish Albums (IRMA) | 37 |
| New Zealand Albums (RMNZ) | 17 |
| Swedish Albums (Sverigetopplistan) | 27 |
| Swiss Albums (Schweizer Hitparade) | 91 |
| UK Albums (OCC) | 21 |
| US Billboard 200 | 23 |

2019 year-end chart performance for The Thrill of It All
| Chart (2019) | Position |
|---|---|
| Danish Albums (Hitlisten) | 88 |
| Icelandic Albums (Plötutíóindi) | 66 |

=== Decade-end charts ===
2010s-end chart performance for The Thrill of It All
| Chart (2010–2019) | Position |
|---|---|
| UK Albums (OCC) | 93 |
| US Billboard 200 | 147 |

== Certifications ==
Certifications and sales for The Thrill of It All
| Region | Certification | Certified units/sales |
|---|---|---|
| Australia (ARIA) | Platinum | 70,000^{‡} |
| Austria (IFPI Austria) | Gold | 7,500^{‡} |
| Canada (Music Canada) | 2× Platinum | 160,000^{‡} |
| Denmark (IFPI Danmark) | 2× Platinum | 40,000^{‡} |
| France (SNEP) | Gold | 50,000^{‡} |
| Iceland (Tónlistinn) | — | 2,541 |
| Italy (FIMI) | Gold | 25,000^{‡} |
| Mexico (AMPROFON) | Gold | 30,000^{‡} |
| Netherlands (NVPI) | Platinum | 40,000^{‡} |
| New Zealand (RMNZ) | 3× Platinum | 45,000^{‡} |
| Norway (IFPI Norway) | 2× Platinum | 40,000^{‡} |
| Poland (ZPAV) | Platinum | 20,000^{‡} |
| Singapore (RIAS) | Platinum | 10,000^{*} |
| Sweden (GLF) | Gold | 15,000^{‡} |
| United Kingdom (BPI) | 2× Platinum | 780,259 |
| United States (RIAA) | 2× Platinum | 2,000,000^{‡} |
^{*} Sales figures based on certification alone.^{‡} Sales+streaming figures based on certification alone.

== Release history ==
| Region | Date | Format(s) | Label | Ref. |
|---|---|---|---|---|
| Various | 3 November 2017 | CD; digital download; streaming | Capitol | |
