= Moments (Freddy Verano song) =

2015 song by Freddy Verano featuring Sam Smith

Single by Freddy Verano featuring Sam Smith

from the album The Lost Tapes – Remixed
- Released: 8 May 2015
- Recorded: 2008
- Genre: House
- Length: 3:21
- Label: Kosmo Records
- Songwriters: John Conlon; Victoria Hemmings; William John Pearce; Lindsey Thompson
- Producer: Freddy Verano

Sam Smith singles chronology
"Lay Me Down" (2015)	"Moments" (2015)	"Omen" (2015)

Music video
- "Moments" on YouTube

"Moments" is a song by German-Colombian producer Freddy Verano featuring Sam Smith, released as a single on 8 May 2015. It was included on Smith's 2015 album, The Lost Tapes – Remixed, which features their early recordings. The original version of the song, titled "Momentarily Mine", was recorded by Smith in 2008.

== Background ==
In 2008, Smith had signed a deal with Venus & Marc Music, a small UK independent label. They started recording songs for their debut album and one of them was a piano ballad, "Momentarily Mine". In 2009, a German dance label Kosmo Records, approached Venus & Mars Music and signed a worldwide license deal for remixing Smith's entire album when it was eventually released. However, in 2010, Smith decided to end their association with Venus & Marc Music and walked away from the deal. When Smith became a marketable name, Kosmo Records used their rights to remix any of the tracks from their unreleased album. After "When It's Alright" a year before, they did it with "Momentarily Mine" in 2015. The song was now simply titled "Moments" and promoted under the name Freddy Verano featuring Sam Smith. It was radically transformed from a piano ballad to a house track. The music video for "Moments" was released on 30 January 2015.

== Track listing ==
- Digital single
1. "Moments" (Radio Edit) – 3:21
2. "Moments" (Extended Mix) – 6:18
- German digital EP
1. "Moments" (Radio Edit) – 3:21
2. "Moments" (Extended Mix) – 6:18
3. "Moments" (Tragic Johnson Radio Edit) – 3:27
4. "Moments" (Tragic Johnson Club Edit) – 5:10
5. "Moments" (Ike's Retro Radio Mix) – 3:07

== Charts ==
Chart (2015)	Peak position
Hungary (Rádiós Top 40)	3
Hungary (Single Top 40)	24

== Release history ==
Country	Date	Format	Version	Label	Ref.
Germany	8 May 2015	Digital download	Remixes EP	Kosmo Records	
Various	15 May 2015	Digital download	Original	Kosmo Records	

== Momentarily Mine ==
"Momentarily Mine"

Single by Sam Smith

from the album Sam Smith Diva Boy
- Released: 4 August 2016
- Recorded: 2008
- Length: 2:38
- Label: Flipbook Music
- Songwriters: John Conlon; Victoria Hemmings; William John Pearce; Lindsey Thompson

Sam Smith singles chronology
"Writing's on the Wall" (2015)	"Momentarily Mine" (2016)	"Too Good at Goodbyes" (2017)

Music video
- "Momentarily Mine" on YouTube

The original 2008 version of the song by the English singer and songwriter Sam Smith, "Momentarily Mine" was released by Flipbook Music on 4 August 2016.

=== Track listing ===
- Digital single
1. "Momentarily Mine" – 2:38

=== Release history ===
Country	Date	Format	Label	Ref.
Various	4 August 2016	Digital download	Flipbook Music	
