= Lay Me Down (Sam Smith song) =

2013 single by Sam Smith

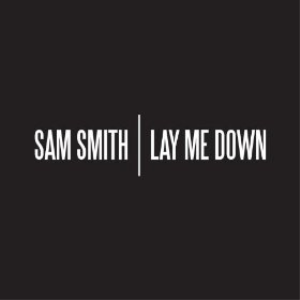

Single by Sam Smith

from the album In the Lonely Hour
- Released: 15 February 2013
- Recorded: 2012
- Genre: Soul; R&B
- Length: 4:13
- Label: Capitol; Method
- Songwriters: Sam Smith; James Napier; Elvin Smith
- Producers: Jimmy Napes; Steve Fitzmaurice

Sam Smith singles chronology
"Latch" (2012)	"Lay Me Down" (2013)	"La La La" (2013)

Music video
- "Lay Me Down" on YouTube

"Lay Me Down" is a song by the English singer Sam Smith, released on 15 February 2013 as the lead single from their debut studio album In the Lonely Hour (2014). It originally peaked at number 46 on the UK singles chart and at number 25 on the US Bubbling Under Hot 100 Singles chart in 2014.

The song was re-released in February 2015 as the sixth single from the album, this time reaching number 8 on the US Billboard Hot 100 and number 15 on the UK Singles Chart. A third version featuring John Legend recorded for the British charity telethon Comic Relief reached number one in the UK in March 2015.

== Composition ==
The song was written by Smith, Jimmy Napes and Elviin and produced by Napes and Steve Fitzmaurice. In a statemend for the 2015 re-release of the song, Smith said about the writing and meaning of the song:

"This was the first song I wrote for this record and the first song I ever wrote with my writing partner Jimmy Napes. This song changed my life and sent me in the direction where it was all about the voice. I'm not looking a certain way, or singing a certain sound it's about the soul, the voice, and the passion, and the truth. "Lay Me Down" continues to teach me lessons every day"

== Reception ==
Britt Julious of Pitchfork wrote that, "although the song's vibe isn't as upbeat as the last time the artists teamed up, the production is light and highlights, rather than overshadows, Smith's powerful voice," which results in "a love song that sounds as equally spiritual as it does romantic."

== Music video ==
The original music video showed Smith and their friends at a casino. Following the announcement of the re-release, it was removed from YouTube and Vevo.

== Track listing ==
Digital download
No.	Title	Length
1.	"Lay Me Down"	3:49
2.	"Lay Me Down" (acoustic version)	4:01
3.	"Lay Me Down" (music video)	4:07

== Charts ==
Chart (2014)	Peak position
Scottish Singles Sales (Official Charts)	60
UK Singles (Official Charts)	46
US Bubbling Under Hot 100 (Billboard)	25

== Release history ==
Region	Date	Format	Label
United Kingdom	15 February 2013	Digital download	Capitol; Method

== 2015 re-release ==
"Lay Me Down"

Single by Sam Smith

from the album In the Lonely Hour
- Released: 22 February 2015
- Recorded: 2014
- Genre: Soul; R&B
- Length: 3:39
- Label: Capitol; Method
- Songwriters: Sam Smith; James Napier; Elvin Smith
- Producers: Jimmy Napes; Steve Fitzmaurice

Sam Smith singles chronology
"Have Yourself a Merry Little Christmas" (2014)	"Lay Me Down" (2015)	"Lay Me Down (Red Nose Day 2015)" (2015)

It was announced on 30 January 2015 that Smith would re-release "Lay Me Down" as the sixth single from their album In the Lonely Hour following commercial success with its previous singles. Smith recorded a new version of the song for its re-release with the track's original producers.

=== Music video ===
The music video for the re-release, which replaced the original, was recorded in St Margaret's Church, Lee, South East London, with the permission of the Rector the Revd. Dr. Alan Race. It was shot in one sequence and depicts Smith at a funeral in the church standing in front of the deceased's coffin. A flashback reveals that Smith actually married the man in question in the same church. The video then returns to present day, some time after the funeral, with Smith mourning the loss of their husband in the empty church.

=== Track listing ===
Digital download – single
No.	Title	Length
1.	"Lay Me Down"	3:39

Digital download – EP
No.	Title	Length
1.	"Lay Me Down" (Pomo remix)	3:45
2.	"Lay Me Down" (Paul Woolford remix)	6:45
3.	"Lay Me Down" (Maya Jane Coles remix)	5:18
4.	"Lay Me Down" (Todd Edwards dub)	6:29
5.	"Lay Me Down" (Tiësto remix)	4:18
6.	"Lay Me Down" (Flume remix – single)	4:30

=== Charts and certifications ===
==== Weekly charts ====
Chart (2015–17)	Peak position
Australia (ARIA)	3
Canada Hot 100 (Billboard)	10
Canada AC (Billboard)	30
Canada CHR/Top 40 (Billboard)	44
Canada Hot AC (Billboard)	33
Czech Republic Singles Digital (ČNS IFPI)	47
Euro Digital Songs (Billboard)	16
France (SNEP)	107
Ireland (IRMA)	14
Italy (FIMI)	67
Japan Hot 100 (Billboard)	80
Mexico Ingles Airplay (Billboard)	23
Netherlands (Single Top 100)	52
New Zealand (Recorded Music NZ)	2
Portugal (AFP)	91
Scottish Singles Sales (Official Charts)	11
Slovakia Singles Digital (ČNS IFPI)	44
Sweden (Sverigetopplistan)	68
Switzerland (Schweizer Hitparade)	44
UK Singles (Official Charts)	15
US Billboard Hot 100	8
US Adult Contemporary (Billboard)	11
US Adult Pop Airplay (Billboard)	12
US Pop Airplay (Billboard)	19
US R&B/Hip-Hop Airplay (Billboard)	41
US Rhythmic Airplay (Billboard)	40

==== Year-end charts ====
Chart (2015)	Position
Australia (ARIA)	34
Canada (Canadian Hot 100)	98
New Zealand (Recorded Music NZ)	22
UK Singles (Official Charts Company)	89
US Billboard Hot 100	81
US Adult Contemporary (Billboard)	35

==== Certifications and sales ====
Region	Certification	Certified units/sales
Australia (ARIA)	7× Platinum	490,000^{‡}
Brazil (Pro-Música Brasil)	3× Platinum	180,000^{‡}
Canada (Music Canada)	5× Platinum	400,000^{‡}
Denmark (IFPI Danmark)	Platinum	90,000^{‡}
Germany (BVMI)	Gold	200,000^{‡}
Italy (FIMI)	Gold	25,000^{‡}
New Zealand (RMNZ)	5× Platinum	150,000^{‡}
Norway (IFPI Norway)	2× Platinum	120,000^{‡}
Portugal (AFP)	Gold	5,000^{‡}
Sweden (GLF)	Platinum	40,000^{‡}
United Kingdom (BPI)	2× Platinum	1,200,000^{‡}
United States (RIAA)	5× Platinum	5,000,000^{‡}
^{‡} Sales+streaming figures based on certification alone.

=== Release history ===
Region	Date	Format	Label	Ref.
United States	3 February 2015	Mainstream radio	Capitol; Method	
United States	23 February 2015	Adult album alternative radio	Capitol; Method	
Australia	20 February 2015	Digital download	Capitol; Method	
Ireland	20 February 2015	Digital download	Capitol; Method	
New Zealand	20 February 2015	Digital download	Capitol; Method	
United Kingdom	22 February 2015	Digital download	Capitol; Method	

== Red Nose Day 2015 release ==
"Lay Me Down (Red Nose Day 2015)"

Single by Sam Smith featuring John Legend

from the album In the Lonely Hour (Drowning Shadows Edition)
- Released: 9 March 2015
- Recorded: 2015
- Genre: Soul; R&B
- Length: 3:39
- Label: Capitol
- Songwriters: Sam Smith; James Napier; Elvin Smith
- Producers: Steve Fitzmaurice; James Napier

Sam Smith singles chronology
"Lay Me Down" (2015)	"Lay Me Down (Red Nose Day 2015)" (2015)	"Moments" (2015)

John Legend singles chronology
"Glory" (2014)	"Lay Me Down (Red Nose Day 2015)" (2015)	"One Man Can Change the World" (2015)

On 9 March 2015, it was announced that Smith and John Legend had joined forces for a third version of "Lay Me Down" to be used as the official Red Nose Day charity single. This version was released the same day and all proceeds from the track's sales benefit the charity. Smith sings the opening verse and first chorus with Legend on the piano, then Legend joins in with the second verse. Some later parts are a duet by the two artists.

=== Music video ===
Smith and Legend also appear in a new video for the charity. It was posted by Smith on their official Vevo account. The music video is also broadcast nationally on BBC One. The video features Smith and Legend recording the song in a recording studio.

=== Live performances ===
On 13 March 2015, Smith and Legend performed "Lay Me Down" together for the first and only time together during Comic Relief – Face the Funny, a major event broadcast live on BBC One from the London Palladium.

=== Charts ===
==== Weekly charts ====
Chart (2015)	Peak position
Belgium (Ultratip Bubbling Under Flanders)	8
Belgium Urban (Ultratop Flanders)	8
Euro Digital Songs (Billboard)	1
Iceland (RÚV)	9
Ireland (IRMA)	4
Netherlands (Tipparade)	18
Scottish Singles Sales (Official Charts)	1
UK Singles (Official Charts)	1

==== Year-end charts ====
Chart (2015)	Position
UK Singles (Official Charts Company)	96

=== Certifications ===
Region	Certification	Certified units/sales
Spain (Promusicae)	Gold	30,000^{‡}
United Kingdom (BPI)	Platinum	421,000
^{‡} Sales+streaming figures based on certification alone.

=== Release history ===
Region	Date	Format	Label
United Kingdom	9 March 2015	Digital download	Capitol
