= One Last Song =

Single by Sam Smith

from the album The Thrill of It All
- Released: 3 November 2017
- Genre: Soul
- Length: 3:12
- Label: Capitol
- Songwriters: Sam Smith; Tyler Johnson; Charles Emanuel Smalls
- Producers: Steve Fitzmaurice; Jimmy Napes; Tyler Johnson

Sam Smith singles chronology
"Too Good at Goodbyes" (2017)	"One Last Song" (2017)	"Pray" (2018)

Music video
- "One Last Song" on YouTube

"One Last Song" is a song by the English singer Sam Smith. It was written by Smith, Tyler Johnson and Charles Emanuel Smalls, with production handled by Steve Fitzmaurice, Jimmy Napes and Johnson. The song was released on 3 November 2017 through Capitol Records, as the second single from Smith's 2017 studio album, The Thrill of It All.

== Commercial performance ==
On 10 November 2017, "One Last Song" debuted on the UK Singles Chart at number twenty-seven, selling 13,851 copies. It also debuted at number thirty-six in Ireland.

== Live performances ==
Smith performed "One Last Song" live during their intimate shows in Los Angeles, New York, London and Berlin in mid-September 2017. On 8 November 2017, they performed it on the Today show in the United States. The singer performed the single at The X Factor UK season 14 finale, on 3 December 2017.

== Charts ==
=== Weekly charts ===
Weekly chart performance for "One Last Song"
Chart (2017–2018)	Peak position
Australia (ARIA)	94
Canada Hot 100 (Billboard)	66
Czech Republic Singles Digital (ČNS IFPI)	89
Ireland (IRMA)	36
Mexico Airplay (Billboard)	44
Netherlands (Single Top 100)	89
New Zealand Heatseekers (RMNZ)	2
Poland Airplay (ZPAV)	30
Portugal (AFP)	83
Scottish Singles Sales (Official Charts)	21
Slovakia Singles Digital (ČNS IFPI)	57
Sweden (Sverigetopplistan)	46
UK Singles (Official Charts)	27
US Bubbling Under Hot 100 (Billboard)	8

=== Year-end charts ===
Year-end chart performance for "One Last Song"
Chart (2018)	Position
Iceland (Plötutíóindi)	73

== Certifications ==
Region	Certification	Certified units/sales
Australia (ARIA)	Platinum	70,000^{‡}
Brazil (Pro-Música Brasil)	Gold	20,000^{‡}
Canada (Music Canada)	Gold	40,000^{‡}
New Zealand (RMNZ)	Platinum	30,000^{‡}
United Kingdom (BPI)	Gold	400,000^{‡}
United States (RIAA)	Gold	500,000^{‡}
^{‡} Sales+streaming figures based on certification alone.

== Release history ==
Region	Date	Format	Label	Ref.
United Kingdom	3 November 2017	Contemporary hit radio	Capitol	
United Kingdom	3 November 2017	Hot adult contemporary radio	Capitol	
Italy	15 December 2017	Contemporary hit radio	Universal	
