= Bad Day All Week =

Single by Sam Smith
- Released: 18 August 2008
- Recorded: 2008
- Genre: Rock
- Label: Venus & Mars Music
- Songwriters: John Conlon; Victoria Hemmings; William John Pearce

Sam Smith singles chronology
"Bad Day All Week" (2008)	"When It's Alright" (2009)

"Bad Day All Week" is the debut single by the English singer Sam Smith, released on 18 August 2008.

== Background ==
In 2008, Smith had signed a deal with Venus & Mars Music, a small UK independent label. They were given songs to record by songwriting team of Victoria Hemmings, William John Pearce and John Conlon, who previously performed together as Lovatux. The first of Smith's recordings to see the light of the day would be "Bad Day All Week", a song which appeared as the B-side on Lovatux's 1996 single, "Something". Ahead of its scheduled release as a single, the decision was made to create a series of dance and club mixes of the song. The single was released in August 2008 with remixes by Kinky Roland and Per QX.

A music video featuring Smith in school uniform was also released but the song failed to make much of an impact on the main charts. However, the remixes gained some traction on a couple of club charts. In 2010, Smith decided to end their association with Venus & Mars Music and walked away from the deal. Because of this, their debut album Time Won't Wait wasn't released. In 2015, the song was remixed by Adrian Bahil and released on The Lost Tapes – Remixed album by Kosmo Records.

== Track listing ==
- Digital single
1. "Bad Day All Week" (Mash Up Radio) – 2:56
2. "Bad Day All Week" (Mash Up Club) – 5:56
3. "Bad Day All Week" (Mash Up Dub) – 5:52
4. "Bad Day All Week" (Mash Up Club Breakbeats) – 5:56
5. "Bad Day All Week" (Mash Up Dub Breakbeats) – 5:54
6. "Bad Day All Week" (Electro House Old School Radio) – 3:11
7. "Bad Day All Week" (Electro House Old School Club) – 6:26
8. "Bad Day All Week" (Electro House Old School Dub) – 6:26
9. "Bad Day All Week" (Party Mix) – 3:29
10. "Bad Day All Week" (4 to the Floor) – 3:16
- Promotional single
1. "Bad Day All Week" (Kinky Roland Club)
2. "Bad Day All Week" (Kinky Roland Dub)
3. "Bad Day All Week" (Per QX Club)
4. "Bad Day All Week" (Per QX Dub)
5. "Bad Day All Week" (Kinky Roland Radio)
6. "Bad Day All Week" (Per QX Radio)

== Release history ==
Country	Date	Format	Label	Ref.
United Kingdom	18 August 2008	Digital download	Venus & Mars Music	
