= Burning (Sam Smith song) =

Promotional single by Sam Smith

from the album The Thrill of It All
- Released: 27 October 2017
- Genre: Soul
- Length: 3:23
- Label: Capitol
- Songwriters: Sam Smith; Jason Boyd; Dominic Jordan; Jimmy Giannos
- Producers: Steve Fitzmaurice; Jimmy Napes

"Burning" is a song by English singer Sam Smith. It was written by Smith, Jason Boyd, Dominic Jordan and Jimmy Giannos, with production handled by Jimmy Napes and Steve Fitzmaurice. The song was released on 27 October 2017 through Capitol Records, as a promotional single from Smith's second studio album, The Thrill of It All (2017).

== Commercial performance ==
On 3 November 2017, "Burning" debuted on the UK Singles Chart at number sixty-three, selling 5,455 copies. The next week, it would be number thirty-four with sales of 10,502 units. However, "Burning" did not appear on the UK Singles Chart because of the rule that primary artists can have only three concurrent entries.

== Charts ==
| Chart (2017) | Peak position |
|---|---|
| Australia (ARIA) | 75 |
| Canada Hot 100 (Billboard) | 63 |
| Finland Download (Latauslista) | 26 |
| France (SNEP) | 129 |
| Ireland (IRMA) | 56 |
| Netherlands (Single Top 100) | 81 |
| New Zealand Heatseekers (RMNZ) | 3 |
| Portugal (AFP) | 92 |
| Scotland Singles (OCC) | 77 |
| Slovakia Singles Digital (ČNS IFPI) | 63 |
| Sweden (Sverigetopplistan) | 27 |
| Switzerland (Schweizer Hitparade) | 52 |
| UK Singles (OCC) | 63 |
| US Bubbling Under Hot 100 (Billboard) | 7 |
| US Digital Song Sales (Billboard) | 41 |

== Certifications ==
Certifications for "Burning"
| Region | Certification | Certified units/sales |
|---|---|---|
| Australia (ARIA) | Gold | 35,000^{‡} |
| Brazil (Pro-Música Brasil) | Gold | 30,000^{‡} |
| Canada (Music Canada) | Gold | 40,000^{‡} |
| New Zealand (RMNZ) | Gold | 15,000^{‡} |
| Norway (IFPI Norway) | Gold | 30,000^{‡} |
| United Kingdom (BPI) | Silver | 200,000^{‡} |
Streaming
| Sweden (GLF) | Gold | 4,000,000^{†} |
^{‡} Sales+streaming figures based on certification alone.^{†} Streaming-only figures based on certification alone.
