= Baby, You Make Me Crazy =

- Friction remix artwork

Single by Sam Smith

from the album The Thrill of It All
- Released: 29 June 2018
- Genre: Doo-wop; pop
- Length: 3:27
- Label: Capitol
- Songwriters: Sam Smith; Jimmy Napes; Emile Haynie; Dennis Ronald Thomas; Woodrow Sparrow; Gene Redd Sr.; George Melvin Brown; Claydes Smith; Richard Westfield; Robert Bell; Robert Mickens; Ronald Bell
- Producers: Steve Fitzmaurice; Jimmy Napes; Haynie

Sam Smith singles chronology
"Pray" (2018)	"Baby, You Make Me Crazy" (2018)	"Promises" (2018)

"Baby, You Make Me Crazy" is a song by the English singer and songwriter Sam Smith. The song was released on 29 June 2018 through Capitol Records, as the fourth and final single from The Thrill of It All. It was written by Smith themselves, Jimmy Napes and Emile Haynie, and contains a sample of "Breeze and Soul" by Ed Watson & The Brass Circle, written by Dennis Ronald Thomas, Woodrow Sparrow, Gene Redd Sr., George Melvin Brown, Claydes Smith, Richard Westfield, Robert Bell, Robert Mickens and Ronald Bell.

== Music video ==
A music video, containing an acoustic version of the song, was released in June 2018. It features Smith with four backing vocalists and a guitarist performing in Italy.

== Track listing ==
Digital download
No.	Title	Length
1.	"Baby, You Make Me Crazy"	3:27

Digital download
No.	Title	Length
1.	"Baby, You Make Me Crazy" (Friction Remix)	3:36

== Charts ==
Chart (2017–18)	Peak position
Belgium (Ultratip Bubbling Under Flanders)	37
Belgium (Ultratip Bubbling Under Wallonia)	32
Ireland (IRMA)	87
Sweden (Sverigetopplistan)	95

== Certifications ==
Region	Certification	Certified units/sales
Australia (ARIA)	Gold	35,000^{‡}
Brazil (Pro-Música Brasil)	Gold	20,000^{‡}
Canada (Music Canada)	Gold	40,000^{‡}
New Zealand (RMNZ)	Gold	15,000^{‡}
^{‡} Sales+streaming figures based on certification alone.

== Release history ==
Region	Date	Format	Version	Label	Ref.
Italy	29 June 2018	Contemporary hit radio	Original	Universal	
United Kingdom	27 July 2018	Contemporary hit radio	Original	Capitol	
United Kingdom	10 August 2018	Digital download	Friction remix	Capitol	
