= When It's Alright =

2009 song by Sam Smith

Single by Sam Smith
- Released: 2 April 2009
- Recorded: 2008
- Genre: House
- Label: Kosmo Records
- Songwriters: John Conlon; Victoria Hemmings; William John Pearce

Sam Smith singles chronology
| "Bad Day All Week" (2008) | "When It's Alright" (2009) | "Latch" (2012) |

"When It's Alright" is a song by the English singer Sam Smith, released as their second single on 2 April 2009.

== Background ==
In February 2009, Venus & Mars Music released promotional singles of "When It's Alright" in the United Kingdom. While it was a pop-soul track in its original form, "When It's Alright" had received remix treatment by Kinky Roland, Per Qx and Kid Massive, and was serviced to club DJs. The remixes transformed the song into a deep house club track. While "When It's Alright" hadn't quite broken into the mainstream, it was gaining positive reviews. Eventually, a German dance label Kosmo Records approached Venus & Mars Music and signed a worldwide license deal for the track. "When It's Alright" was re-promoted in April 2009 with new remixes by German producer, Tom Novy.

== Track listing ==
- 2009 digital single
1. "When It's Alright" (Tom Novy Radio Edit) – 3:36
2. "When It's Alright" (Kid Massive Radio Edit) – 3:05
3. "When It's Alright" (Tom Novy Remix) – 7:41
4. "When It's Alright" (Kid Massive Remix) – 5:50
5. "When It's Alright" (Kinky Roland Mix) – 7:24
6. "When It's Alright" (Per QX Remix) – 6:03

== Remixes ==
1. Kid Massive Radio Edit
2. Kid Massive Remix
3. Kid Massive Dub
4. Kinky Roland Radio Edit
5. Kinky Roland Remix
6. Kinky Roland Dub
7. Per Qx Radio Edit
8. Per Qx Remix
9. Per Qx Dub
10. Per QX Instrumental
11. Tom Novy Radio Edit
12. Tom Novy Remix
13. Tom Novy Dub

== Release history ==
| Country | Date | Format | Label | Ref. |
|---|---|---|---|---|
| United Kingdom | February 2009 | Promotional CD | Venus & Mars Music | |
| Various | 2 April 2009 | Digital download | Kosmo Records | |

== Juun featuring Sam Smith version ==
"When It's Alright"

Single by Juun featuring Sam Smith

from the album The Lost Tapes – Remixed
- Released: 9 August 2013
- Recorded: 2008
- Genre: House
- Length: 3:17
- Label: Kosmo Records
- Songwriters: John Conlon; Victoria Hemmings; William John Pearce
- Producer: Juun

Sam Smith singles chronology
| "La La La" (2013) | "When It's Alright" (2013) | "Money on My Mind" (2014) |

Music video
- "When It's Alright" on YouTube

Once Sam Smith became a successful artist, "When It's Alright" was completely transformed and credited to German producers Juun featuring Sam Smith. At first, a music video for Tomcraft Radio Edit was filmed in Ibiza and released on 24 July 2013. On 9 August 2013, Kosmo Records released Tomcraft remixes of "When It's Alright" digitally. On 24 April 2014, a music video was released for the Juun featuring Sam Smith Radio Edit, using the same Ibiza footage. On 8 May 2014, a new music video premiered and the single was re-released on 16 May 2014. It became a club hit in Germany and reached number 74 on the main Top 100 Singles chart. This version of "When It's Alright" was later included on Smith's 2015 album, The Lost Tapes – Remixed, which features their early recordings.

=== Track listing ===
- 2013 digital single
1. "When It's Alright" (Tomcraft Radio Edit) – 3:16
2. "When It's Alright" (Tomcraft Remix) – 5:55
- 2014 German Digital EP
1. "When It's Alright" (Radio Edit) – 3:17
2. "When It's Alright" (HEYHEY's Grand Piano Remix) – 3:10
3. "When It's Alright" (Tomcraft Remix) – 5:56
4. "When It's Alright" (Extended Edit) – 5:09
5. "When It's Alright" (Dinnerdate Remix) – 5:23
- 2014 German CD single
1. "When It's Alright" (Radio Edit) – 3:17
2. "When It's Alright" (HEYHEY's Grand Piano Remix) – 3:10
- 2014 French Digital EP
1. "When It's Alright" (Radio Edit) – 3:17
2. "When It's Alright" (Extended) – 5:06
3. "When It's Alright" (Tomcraft Remix) – 5:55
4. "When It's Alright" (Tomcraft Radio Edit) – 3:19

=== Charts ===
| Chart (2014) | Peak position |
|---|---|
| Germany (GfK) | 74 |

=== Release history ===
| Country | Date | Format | Label | Ref. |
|---|---|---|---|---|
| Various | 9 August 2013 | Digital download | Kosmo Records | |
| Germany | 16 May 2014 | Digital download | Kosmo Records | |
| Germany | 13 June 2014 | CD single | Kosmo Records | |
