= Too Good at Goodbyes =

Single by Sam Smith

from the album The Thrill of It All
- Released: 8 September 2017
- Genre: Orchestral pop
- Length: 3:21
- Label: Capitol
- Songwriters: James Napier; Tor Hermansen; Mikkel Eriksen; Sam Smith
- Producers: Jimmy Napes; Steve Fitzmaurice; StarGate

Sam Smith singles chronology
"Momentarily Mine" (2016)	"Too Good at Goodbyes" (2017)	"One Last Song" (2017)

Music video
- "Too Good at Goodbyes" on YouTube

"Too Good at Goodbyes" is a song by the English singer Sam Smith. It was released on 8 September 2017 through Capitol Records, as the lead single from their second studio album, The Thrill of It All (2017).

The song reached number one on the UK singles chart and number four on the Billboard Hot 100. It also topped the charts in Australia, South Africa and New Zealand, and reached the top 10 in Belgium, Canada, Denmark, France, Ireland, Italy, Netherlands, Norway, Portugal, Sweden, and Switzerland, as well as the top 20 in Austria, Finland, Germany, and Spain.

== Background and release ==
On 31 August 2017, Smith announced new music was coming via social media. On 1 September, Spotify put up billboards in New York City, Los Angeles, and London to announce the release date of Smith's new music. The song was released worldwide to download and streaming websites on 8 September.

== Composition ==
The song was written by Smith, James Napier, and Stargate. They produced the song with Jimmy Napes and Steve Fitzmaurice. The sheet music for "Too Good at Goodbyes" shows the key of D minor in common time with a tempo of 92 beats per minute. The chord progression is Dm–F–C–Gm7. Smith's vocals span from F_{3} to D_{5}. Smith explained the meaning of the song, dedicated to a boy they were in a relationship with in 2016:

"Think about what the relationship was the positives and the negatives and sit and live with it a bit. The song is about a relationship I was in and it's basically about getting good at being dumped. It's been a long while since I have put any music out and I feel this first single sets the tone of what is to come.

== Critical reception ==
Jon Blistein from Rolling Stone called Smith's comeback song "poignant" and wrote, "The piano-led song finds the singer pulling away from a volatile relationship. 'But every time you hurt me, the less that I cry / And every time you leave me, the quicker these tears dry,' he sings, soulfully. 'And every time you walk out, the less I love you / Baby, we don't stand a chance / It's sad, but it's true.' The lilting chorus is buoyed by a choir, as they harmonize, 'I'm way too good at goodbyes.'" Chris Willman of Variety said about the track, "Once again, Smith is plumbing the depths of melancholia with a flawless, effortlessly flexible tenor that seems to be on loan to the underworld from somewhere in the heavens. There's not a lot in the track that he, carry-over collaborator Jimmy Napes, and songwriter-producer duo Stargate have come up with to detract from that instrument. For the first minute of the song, Smith's voice is joined only by the sparsest and most basic piano chords, along with some finger-snapping. Eventually a light beat kicks in, then a gospel choir, as if to almost mock Smith's romantic lamentation by raising it to the level of spiritual battle." Marc Hogan of Pitchfork was more negative, and opined "'Too Good at Goodbyes' doesn't so much reflect a person exceptionally skilled in ending relationships as it feels equal parts calculating and convoluted."

== Music video ==
Smith uploaded the official audio to their YouTube and Vevo accounts on 8 September 2017. The audio was later removed when they released the official music video for the song on 18 September 2017. It was filmed in Newcastle upon Tyne. On 29 September 2017, Smith released a video of them performing "Too Good at Goodbyes" at the Round Chapel in Hackney. As of August 2019, the music video has been viewed over 1.2 billion times.

== Chart performance ==
"Too Good at Goodbyes" topped the UK Singles Chart on 15 September 2017 - for the week ending dated 21 September 2017 - with 33,000 downloads and 4.4 million streams, dethroning Taylor Swift's "Look What You Made Me Do" from the summit and giving Smith their sixth number-one single on the chart. It also stayed atop the UK charts for three consecutive weeks giving Smith their longest run at number one there. It is also Smith third most successful song with over 1.9 million copies sold in the country as of 2023. It also debuted at number one in Australia and New Zealand. It is Smith's first number one single in Australia.

In the United States, the song entered at number five on the Billboard Hot 100 on the issue dated 30 September with 90,000 downloads and 20.8 million streams, topping the Digital Songs chart and receiving an audience of 35 million in radio airplay. It is also Smith's highest debut in the country and their second song to top the Digital Songs chart after "Stay with Me" in 2014. "Too Good at Goodbyes" later ascended to number four on the issue dated 25 November, after the release of The Thrill of It All. In November 2017, the song was certified platinum in the US for shipments of one million units.

== Live performances ==
Smith announced four live dates in September to help promote the song. They also performed it at the We Can Survive concert on 21 October.

== Formats and track listings ==
- Digital download
1. "Too Good at Goodbyes" – 3:21
- Digital download (Acoustic)
1. "Too Good at Goodbyes" (Acoustic) – 3:40
- Digital download (Galantis Remix)
1. "Too Good at Goodbyes" (Galantis Remix) – 3:12
- Digital download (Snakehips Remix)
1. "Too Good at Goodbyes" (Snakehips Remix) – 3:58

== Credits and personnel ==
Personnel

- Lead vocals, Additional Background vocals – Sam Smith
- Choir arrangement – Lawrence Johnson
- Choir vocals – The LJ Singers
- Songwriting – Sam Smith, James Napier, Mikkel Storleer Eriksen, Tor Erik Hermansen
- Production – Jimmy Napes, Steve Fitzmaurice, Stargate
- Recording engineers – Steve Fitzmaurice, Darren Heelis, Gus Pirelli
- Assistant engineers – Tom Archer, Henri Davies, Isabel Gracefield Grundy, Steph Marziano, John Prestage, Will Purton
- Mixing – Steve Fitzmaurice
- Mastering – Bob Ludwig
- Drums – Earl Harvin
- Percussion – StarGate, Jimmy Napes, Earl Harvin
- Drum programming – Steve Fitzmaurice, Darren Heelis
- Bass – Jodi Milliner
- Acoustic and Rhodes electric pianos – Reuben James
- Guitar – Ben Jones
- String leaders – Richard George, Everton Nelson, Bruce White, Ian Burdge

== In popular culture ==
On February 6, 2020, former Clasher Carl Malone Montecido covered this song and went viral in the world.

== Charts ==
=== Weekly charts ===
Weekly chart performance for "Too Good at Goodbyes"
Chart (2017–2018)	Peak position
Australia (ARIA)	1
Austria (Ö3 Austria Top 40)	12
Belgium (Ultratop 50 Flanders)	2
Belgium (Ultratop 50 Wallonia)	5
Brazil (Top 100 Brasil)	80
Canada Hot 100 (Billboard)	2
Canada AC (Billboard)	8
Canada CHR/Top 40 (Billboard)	13
Canada Hot AC (Billboard)	9
Czech Republic Airplay (ČNS IFPI)	10
Czech Republic Singles Digital (ČNS IFPI)	9
Denmark (Tracklisten)	2
Euro Digital Song Sales (Billboard)	2
Finland (Suomen virallinen lista)	18
France (SNEP)	6
Germany (GfK)	18
Hungary (Rádiós Top 40)	31
Hungary (Single Top 40)	15
Hungary (Stream Top 40)	15
Iceland (RÚV)	5
Ireland (IRMA)	2
Italy (FIMI)	6
Japan Hot 100 (Billboard)	56
Latvia (DigiTop100)	9
Lebanon Airplay (Lebanese Top 20)	8
Luxembourg Digital Song Sales (Billboard)	6
Malaysia (RIM)	1
Mexico Airplay (Billboard)	16
Netherlands (Dutch Top 40)	5
Netherlands (Mega Top 50)	4
Netherlands (Single Top 100)	3
New Zealand (Recorded Music NZ)	1
Norway (VG-lista)	5
Philippines (Philippine Hot 100)	3
Poland Airplay (ZPAV)	22
Portugal (AFP)	4
Scottish Singles Sales (Official Charts)	1
Slovakia Airplay (ČNS IFPI)	24
Slovakia Singles Digital (ČNS IFPI)	5
Slovenia (SloTop50)	15
South Korea (Gaon)	39
Spain (Promusicae)	18
Sweden (Sverigetopplistan)	2
Switzerland (Schweizer Hitparade)	5
UK Singles (Official Charts)	1
US Billboard Hot 100	4
US Adult Alternative Airplay (Billboard)	31
US Adult Contemporary (Billboard)	7
US Adult Pop Airplay (Billboard)	6
US Dance Club Songs (Billboard)	4
US Dance Airplay (Billboard)	10
US Pop Airplay (Billboard)	6
US R&B/Hip-Hop Airplay (Billboard)	26
US Rhythmic Airplay (Billboard)	27

=== Year-end charts ===
2017 year-end chart performance for "Too Good at Goodbyes"
Chart (2017)	Position
Australia (ARIA)	53
Belgium (Ultratop Flanders)	49
Belgium (Ultratop Wallonia)	95
Canada (Canadian Hot 100)	66
Denmark (Tracklisten)	41
France (SNEP)	176
Germany (Official German Charts)	96
Hungary (Stream Top 40)	57
Netherlands (Dutch Top 40)	28
Netherlands (Single Top 100)	55
Portugal (AFP)	55
Sweden (Sverigetopplistan)	40
Switzerland (Schweizer Hitparade)	66
UK Singles (OCC)	39
US Billboard Hot 100	77
US Adult Contemporary (Billboard)	34

2018 year-end chart performance for "Too Good at Goodbyes"
Chart (2018)	Position
Australia (ARIA)	81
Belgium (Ultratop Flanders)	54
Belgium (Ultratop Wallonia)	96
Canada (Canadian Hot 100)	47
Denmark (Tracklisten)	50
France (SNEP)	166
Iceland (Plötutíóindi)	37
Portugal (AFP)	80
Sweden (Sverigetopplistan)	83
UK Singles (OCC)	85
US Billboard Hot 100	49
US Adult Contemporary (Billboard)	21
US Adult Top 40 (Billboard)	29
US Mainstream Top 40 (Billboard)	38

== Certifications ==
Certifications and sales for "Too Good at Goodbyes"
Region	Certification	Certified units/sales
Australia (ARIA)	10× Platinum	700,000^{‡}
Austria (IFPI Austria)	2× Platinum	60,000^{‡}
Belgium (BRMA)	Platinum	20,000^{‡}
Brazil (Pro-Música Brasil)	3× Diamond	750,000^{‡}
Canada (Music Canada)	9× Platinum	720,000^{‡}
Denmark (IFPI Danmark)	4× Platinum	360,000^{‡}
France (SNEP)	Platinum	133,333^{‡}
Germany (BVMI)	Platinum	400,000^{‡}
Italy (FIMI)	2× Platinum	100,000^{‡}
Mexico (AMPROFON)	2× Platinum+Gold	150,000^{‡}
New Zealand (RMNZ)	7× Platinum	210,000^{‡}
Norway (IFPI Norway)	4× Platinum	240,000^{‡}
Poland (ZPAV)	2× Platinum	40,000^{‡}
Portugal (AFP)	4× Platinum	40,000^{‡}
Spain (Promusicae)	3× Platinum	180,000^{‡}
United Kingdom (BPI)	4× Platinum	2,400,000^{‡}
United States (RIAA)	6× Platinum	6,000,000^{‡}
Streaming
Sweden (GLF)	4× Platinum	32,000,000^{†}
^{‡} Sales+streaming figures based on certification alone.^{†} Streaming-only figures based on certification alone.

== Release history ==
Region	Date	Format	Version	Label	Ref.
Various	8 September 2017	Digital download	Original	Capitol	
Italy	8 September 2017	Contemporary hit radio	Original	Universal	
United Kingdom	8 September 2017	Contemporary hit radio	Original	Capitol	
United States	18 September 2017	Adult album alternative radio	Original	Capitol	
Various	29 September 2017	Digital download	Acoustic	Capitol	
Various	29 September 2017	Digital download	Galantis Remix	Capitol	
Various	29 September 2017	Digital download	Snakehips Remix	Capitol	
Various	22 February 2018	Digital download	Live at the BRITs	Capitol	

== See also ==
- List of number-one singles of 2017 (Australia)
- List of number-one songs of 2017 (Malaysia)
- List of number-one singles from the 2010s (New Zealand)
- List of Scottish number-one singles of 2017
- List of UK Singles Chart number ones of the 2010s
- List of highest-certified singles in Australia
