= 2014 UK Music Video Awards =

- Date: 10 November 2014
- Location: Queen Elizabeth Hall, Southbank Centre, London
- Hosted by: Adam Buxton
- Website: www.ukmva.com

The 2014 UK Music Video Awards were held on 10 November 2014 at the Queen Elizabeth Hall in Southbank Centre, London and was hosted by Adam Buxton to recognise the best in music videos and music film making from United Kingdom and worldwide. The nominations were announced on 2 October 2014. The collaboration "Turn Down for What" between French producer DJ Snake and American rapper/producer Lil Jon received the award for Video of the Year, directed by filmmaking duo Daniels. Korea-American director Joseph Kahn received the Icon Award. Below are the list of nominations, the winners are highlighted in bold.

== Video of the Year ==
Video of the Year
- **DJ Snake and Lil Jon – "Turn Down for What" (Directors: Daniels)**

== Icon Award ==
Video of the Year
- **Joseph Kahn**

== Video Genre Categories ==
Best Pop Video - UK	Best Pop Video - International
**Paolo Nutini – "Iron Sky"** **(Director: Daniel Wolfe)**; Ella Eyre – "If I Go"; George Ezra – "Budapest"; Jessie Ware – "Tough Love"; Katy B – "Crying for No Reason"; Metronomy – "Love Letters"	**Sia – "Chandelier"** **(Directors: Sia / Daniel Askill)**; Jamaica – "Two on Two"; Keisza – "Hideaway"; Pharrell – "Happy"; Pharrell – "Marilyn Monroe"; Stromae – "Tous Les Mêmes"
Best Dance Video - UK	Best Dance Video - International
**Disclosure – "Grab Her"** **(Director: Emile Sornin)**; Chase & Status ft. Jacob Banks – "Alive"; Jon Hopkins – "Collider"; Julio Bashmore – "Peppermint"; Jungle – "Busy Earnin'"; Wilkinson – "Afterglow"	**DJ Snake and Lil Jon – "Turn Down for What"** **(Directors: Daniels)**; Gesaffelstein – "Hate or Glory"; Hercules and Love Affair – "I Try and Talk to You"; Klangkarussell – "Netzwerk (Falls Like Rain)"; Movement – "Ivory"; Vic Mensa – "Down On My Luck"
Best Urban Video - UK	Best Urban Video - International
**Last Night In Paris – "Pure"** **(Director: Karim Huu Do)**; Hawk House – "Chill Pill"; M.I.A. – "Double Bubble Trouble"; Raleigh Ritchie – "Stronger Than Ever"; Rudimental ft. Becky Hill – "Powerless"; Scrufizzer – "Kick It"	**J. Cole ft. Amber Coffman – "She Knows"** **(Director: Sam Pilling)**; Childish Gambino – "3005"; Childish Gambino – "Sweatpants"; Dominique Young Unique – "Throw It Down"; Iggy Azalea – "Change Your Life"; Tyler, The Creator – "Tamale"
Best Rock/Indie Video - UK	Best Rock/Indie Video - International
**Throne – "Tharsis Sleeps"** **(Directors: Nicos Livesey & Tom Bunker)**; Drenge – "Fuckabout"; Jake Bugg – "There's a Beast and We All Feed It"; James – "Moving On"; Peace – "Money"; Peace – "Lost On Me"	**Queens of the Stone Age – "Smooth Sailing"** **(Director: Hiro Murai)**; Jack White – "Lazaretto"; Kaja Gunnufsen – "Au"; Mastodon – "High Road"; OK Go – "The Writing's On The Wall"; PUP – "Guilt Trip"
Best Alternative Video - UK	Best Alternative Video - International
**Atoms for Peace – "Before Your Very Eyes..."** **(Director: Andrew Thomas Huang)**; Alt-J – "Hunger of the Pine"; Ibeyi – "River"; London Grammar – "Nightcall"; Metronomy – "Reservoir"; Placebo – "Too Many Friends"	**Arcade Fire – "After Life"** **(Director: Emily Kai Bock)**; DyE – "She's Bad"; Jackson and his Computerband – "G.I. Jane"; Liars – "Mess On a Mission"; MGMT – "Cool Song No 2"; St Vincent – "Digital Witness"
Best Pop Video - Budget	Best Dance Video - Budget
**The Correspondents – "Fear and Delight"** **(Director: Naren Wilks)**; Catfish and the Bottlemen – "Fallout"; Midnight Juggernauts – "Systematic"; Mister D – "Chleb"; New Beat Fund – "Get Up"; Rosemary – "I Know"	**Friend Within – "The Renegade"** **(Director: Craig Moore)**; Basement Jaxx – "Mermaid of Salinas"; Festival Girlfriend – "Infatuation"; Halogen – "So"; Max Cooper – "Supine"; TCTS – "These Heights"
Best Urban Video - Budget	Best Rock/Indie Video - Budget
**Bonnie Banane – "Champs-Elysees"** **(Director: Helmi)**; Die Antwoord – "Pitbull Terrier"; Knytro – "My Motive (Movement)"; Moors – "Asphyxiated"; Pearls Negras – "Make It Last"; Run the Jewels – "A Christmas F*cking Miracle"	**Kid Wise – "Hope"** **(Director: Truman & Cooper)**; Eugene McGuiness – "Godiva"; Lonely The Brave – "Victory Line"; PUP – "Reservoir"; Small Black – "Breathless"; Tiny Ruins – "Carriages"
Best Alternative Video - Budget
**FKA Twigs – "Papi Pacify"** **(Directors: FKA Twigs & Tom Beard)**; Bored Nothing – "Let Down"; FKA Twigs – "Tw-ache"; Goose – "Your Ways"; Jenny Wilson – "The Future"; Joan As Police Woman – "Witness"

== Technical Achievement Categories ==
Best Animation in a Video	Best Art Direction & Design in a Video
**James – "Moving"** **(Animator: Ainslie Henderson, Michael Huges)**; Coldplay – "Always in My Head"; Nils Frahm – "Re"; Metronomy – "Reservoir"; Savages – "Marshal Dear"; Throne – "Tharsis Sleeps"	**OK Go – "The Writing's On The Wall"** **(Art Director: Ethan Tobman)**; Bob Dylan – "Like a Rolling Stone"; Metronomy – "I'm Aquarius"; Metronomy – "Love Letters"; Paolo Nutini – "Iron Sky"; St Vincent – "Digital Witness"
Best Cinematography in a Video	Best Choreography in a Video
**Paolo Nutini – "Iron Sky"** **(DOP: Robbie Ryan)**; Jon Hopkins – "Collider"; London Grammar – "Nightcall"; MGMT – "Cool Song No 2"; Paul McCartney – "Early Days"; Woodkid – "Golden Age"	**Peace – "Money"** **(Choreographer: Supple Nam)**; Ed Sheeran – "Don't"; FKA Twigs – "Papi Pacify"; FKA Twigs – "Tw-ache"; Hercules and Love Affair – "I Try and Talk to You"; Jungle – "Time"
Best Editing in a Video	Best Styling in a Video
**Jon Hopkins – "Collider"** **(Editor: Dan Sherwen at Final Cut)**; DJ Snake and Lil Jon – "Turn Down for What"; Franz Ferdinand – "Evil Eye"; Kid Wise – "Hope"; Moody Good – "Musicbx"; Peace – "Money"	**Brooke Candy – "Opulence"** **(Stylist: Nicola Formichetti)**; Coldplay – "Magic"; Iggy Azalea ft. Charli XCX – "Fancy"; Paul McCartney – "Early Days"; Skrillex – "Ragga Bomb"; St Vincent – "Digital Witness"
Best Colour Grade in a Video	Best Visual Effects in a Video
**Paloma Faith – "Can't Rely on You"** **(Colourist: George K at MPC)**; Alt-J – "Hunger of the Pine"; DJ Snake and Lil Jon – "Turn Down for What"; Paloma Faith – "Only Love Can Hurt Like This"; Paolo Nutini – "Iron Sky"; Sam Smith – "I'm Not the Only One"	**Alt-J – "Hunger of the Pine"** **(VFX: Electric Theatre Collective)**; Atoms for Peace – "Before Your Very Eyes..."; Disclosure – "Grab Her"; DJ Snake and Lil Jon – "Turn Down for What"; DyE – "She's Bad"; Liars – "Mess On a Mission"

== Non-traditional Music Visual and Public Vote Categories ==
Best Live Music Coverage	Best Music AD - TV or Online
**Black Rebel Motorcycle Club – "Live in Paris"** **(Director: Bartleberry Logan)**; Coldplay – "Ghost Stories Sky Arts"; Rudimental – "Live at Brixton Academy"; Rolling Stones – "Sweet Summer Sun"; Sam Smith ft. Howard Lawrence – "Make It To Me Stripped Live (Vevo Lift UK)"; Savages – "Live at the Forum"	**Disclosure – "Settle"** **(Director: Kate Moross)**; Bob Dylan – "Like a Rolling Stone"; Bombay Bicycle Club – "So Long, See You Tomorrow"; Last Night In Paris – "Pure"; London Grammar – "If I Wait"; Sam Smith / Google Play – "Live at The Roundhouse"
Best Interactive Video	VEVO Must See Award (Public Voted)
**Bob Dylan – "Like a Rolling Stone"** **(Director: Vania Heymann)**; Damon Albarn – "Heavy Seas of Love"; Death Koolaid – "Second Rule"; Étienne de Crécy – "Hashtag My Ass"; ManCub – "Waiting in Line 3D"; Pharrell – "24 Hours of Happy"	**Wilkinson – "Afterglow"**; Bombay Bicycle Club – "Luna"; Catfish and the Bottlemen – "Fallout"; Duke Dumont – "Won't Look Back"; Ella Eyre – "If I Go"; Jungle – "Time"

== Individual Categories ==
Best Producer	Best Commissioner
**Amber Millington**; Brett Webb; Joe Walker; Jules de Chateleux; Rik Green; Sarah Tognazzi	**Caroline Clayton**; Connie Meade; Dan Curwin; James Hackett; Sam Seager; Semera Khan
Best Director	Best New Director
**Hiro Murai**; Aoife McArdle; Fleur & Manu; Nabil; Ninian Doff; Sophie Muller	**Truman and Cooper**; George Belfield; Georgia Hudson; Nadia; Oliver Hadlee Pearch; Thomas Rhazi
Best Video Artist
**FKA Twigs**; James Vincent McMorrow; Jungle; London Grammar; Metronomy; Paloma Faith
