= Rap Rave =

Rap Rave may refer to:

- "Rap Rave", a song by Scrufizzer
- Rap-rave blends rap lyrics with rave beats, exemplified by Die Antwoord.
