= List of awards and nominations received by Sam Smith =

Sam Smith awards and nominations
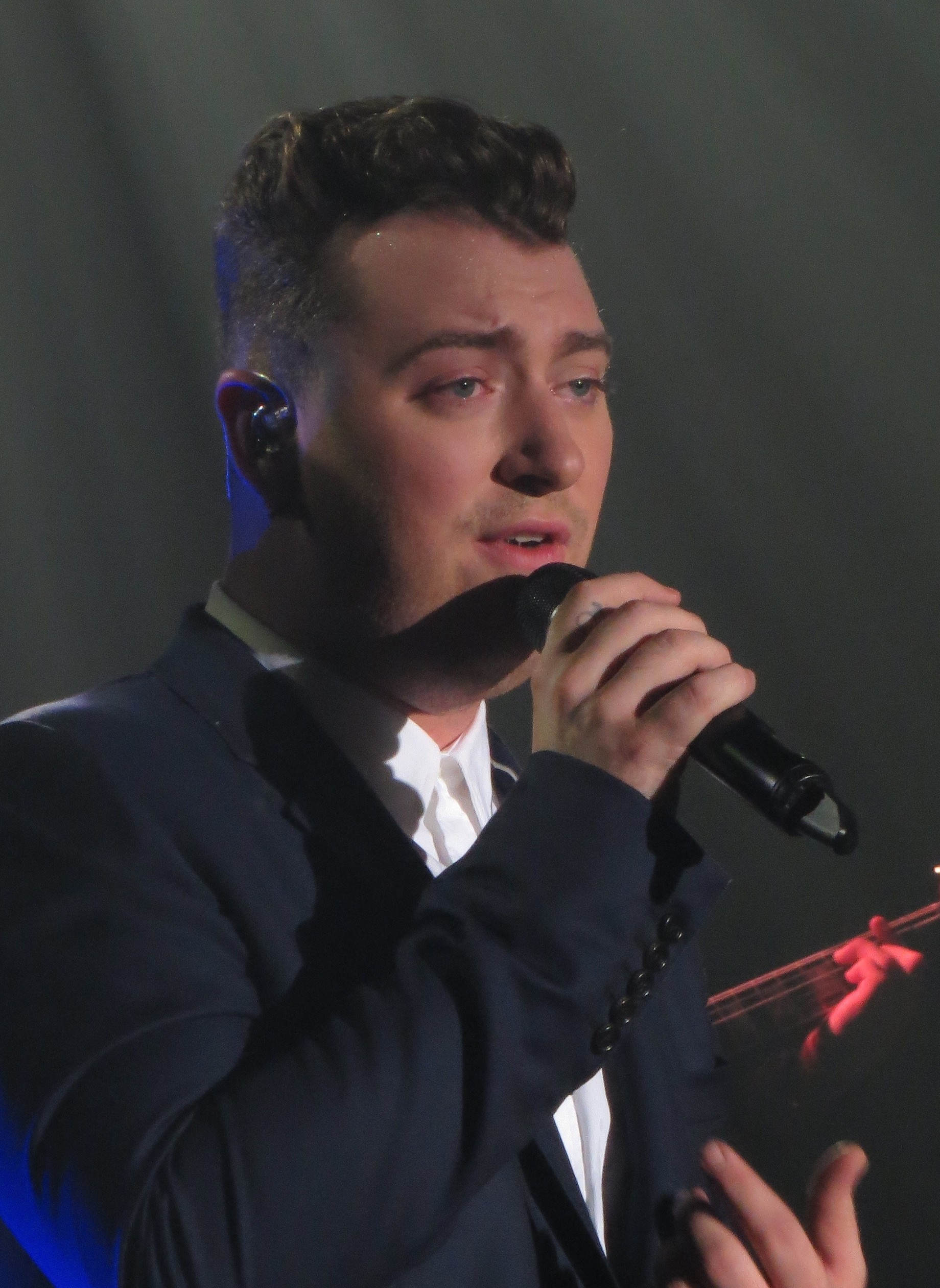
- Smith performing in Glasgow in 2014
Awards and nominations
Award	Wins	Nominations
Academy Awards	1	1
American Music Awards	1	5
BET Awards	1	1
Billboard Music Awards	3	13
BMI Awards	25	25
Brit Awards	4	9
Golden Globe Awards	1	1
Grammy Awards	5	7
iHeartRadio Music Awards	1	4
MOBO Awards	6	7
MTV Europe Music Awards	1	3
MTV Italian Music Awards	0	1
MTV Video Music Awards	0	2
MTV Video Music Awards Japan	1	2
Nickelodeon Kids' Choice Awards	0	1
People's Choice Awards	0	4
Q Awards	1	1
Sound of...	1	1
Teen Choice Awards	0	3
Young Hollywood Awards	1	3
YouTube Music Awards	1	1

Totals (Note: Certain award groups do not simply award one winner. They acknowledge several different recipients, have runners-up, and have third place. Since this is a specific recognition and is different from losing an award, runner-up mentions are considered wins in this award tally. For simplification and to avoid errors, each award in this list has been presumed to have had a prior nomination.)
- Wins: 68
- Nominations: 155

Sam Smith is an English singer and songwriter. Born in London, England, Smith rose to fame in October 2012 when they were featured on the electronic music duo Disclosure's breakthrough single "Latch". In December 2013, Sam was nominated for the 2014 BRIT Critics' Choice Award and the BBC's Sound of 2014 poll, both of which they won. Sam released their debut studio album, In the Lonely Hour, in May 2014 on Capitol Records. Subsequently, the album attained international success and won several awards, including Best Pop Vocal Album, Best New Artist, Record of the Year, Song of the Year, and nominations for Album of the Year and Best Pop Solo Performance at the 57th Annual Grammy Awards. Smith has won five Grammy Awards, three Brit Awards, three Billboard Music Awards, an American Music Award as well as a Golden Globe and an Academy Award through their career.

== Academy Awards ==
The Academy Awards, or Oscars, is an annual American awards ceremony honoring cinematic achievements in the film industry, and is organised by the Academy of Motion Picture Arts and Sciences (AMPAS). Smith has been awarded once.

Year	Nominee / work	Award	Result	Ref.
2016	"Writing's on the Wall"	Best Original Song	Won	

== American Music Awards ==
The American Music Awards (AMAs) is an annual music awards show created by Dick Clark in 1973. Smith has received one award from five nominations.

Year	Nominee / work	Award	Result	Ref.
2014	Sam Smith	New Artist of the Year	Nominated	
2014	Sam Smith	Favorite Pop/Rock Male Artist	Won	
2015	Sam Smith	Artist of the Year	Nominated	
2015	Sam Smith	Favorite Pop/Rock Male Artist	Nominated	
2015	In the Lonely Hour	Favorite Pop/Rock Album	Nominated	

== APRA Music Awards ==
The APRA Music Awards in Australia are annual awards to celebrate excellence in contemporary music, which honour the skills of member composers, songwriters and publishers who have achieved outstanding success in sales and airplay performance. Smith has received one nomination.

Year	Nominee / Work	Award	Result	Ref.
2020	"Promises" (with Calvin Harris)	Most Performed International Work of the Year	Nominated	

== ARIA Music Awards ==
The ARIA Music Awards are presented annually by the Australian Recording Industry Association to recognize achievements in the Australian music industry. Smith has received two nominations.

Year	Nominee / work	Award	Result	Ref.
2015	Sam Smith	International Artist of the Year	Nominated	
2018	Sam Smith	International Artist of the Year	Nominated	

== Attitude Awards ==
The Attitude Awards is hosted by British magazine Attitude to honor the LGBT+ community and its allies.

Year	Nominee / work	Award	Result	Ref.
2019	Sam Smith	Person of the Year	Won	

== BBC Music Awards ==
The BBC Music Awards are the BBC's inaugural pop music awards, first held in December 2014, as a celebration of the musical achievements over the past 12 months. Smith has received two nominations.

Year	Nominee / work	Award	Result	Ref.
2014	Sam Smith	British Artist of the Year	Nominated	
2014	"Money on My Mind"	Song of the Year	Nominated	

== BBC Radio 1 Teen Awards ==
The BBC Radio 1 Teen Awards is an award show by the British radio station BBC Radio 1 to honor the top artists in music and acting of the year. Smith has received two nominations.

Year	Nominee / work	Award	Result	Ref.
2014	Sam Smith	Best British Solo Artist	Nominated	
2014	Sam Smith	Best Breakthrough Award	Nominated	

== BBC Sound of... ==
Sound of... is an annual BBC poll of music critics and industry figures to find the most promising new music talent. Smith has received one award.

Year	Nominee / work	Award	Result	Ref.
2014	Sam Smith	Sound of 2014	Won	

== BET Awards ==
The BET Awards were established in 2001 by the Black Entertainment Television network to celebrate African Americans and other minorities in music, acting, sports, and other fields of entertainment. Smith has received one award.

Year	Nominee / work	Award	Result	Ref.
2015	Sam Smith	Best New Artist	Won	

== Berlin Music Video Awards ==
The Berlin Music Video Awards is an international festival that promotes the art of music videos.

Year	Nominee / work	Award	Result	Ref.
2023	Unholy	Best Cinematography	Nominated	

== Billboard Awards ==
=== Billboard Music Awards ===
The Billboard Music Awards are held to honor artists for commercial performance in the U.S., based on record charts published by Billboard. The awards are based on sales data by Nielsen SoundScan and radio information by Nielsen Broadcast Data Systems. The award ceremony was held from 1990 to 2007, until its reintroduction in 2011. Smith has received three awards from thirteen nominations.

Year	Nominee / work	Award	Result	Ref.
2015	Sam Smith	Top Artist	Nominated	
2015	Sam Smith	Top New Artist	Won	
2015	Sam Smith	Top Male Artist	Won	
2015	Sam Smith	Top Billboard 200 Artist	Nominated	
2015	Sam Smith	Top Hot 100 Artist	Nominated	
2015	Sam Smith	Top Radio Songs Artist	Won	
2015	Sam Smith	Top Song Sales Artist	Nominated	
2015	In the Lonely Hour	Top Billboard 200 Album	Nominated	
2015	"Stay with Me"	Top Hot 100 Song	Nominated	
2015	"Stay with Me"	Top Radio Song	Nominated	
2015	"Stay with Me"	Top Selling Song	Nominated	
2015	"Stay with Me"	Top Streaming Song (Audio)	Nominated	
2015	"Latch"	Top Dance/Electronic Song	Nominated	

== BMI Awards ==
The BMI Awards are held annually by Broadcast Music, Inc. to award songwriters in various genres, including country and pop. Smith has received 25 awards.

=== BMI London Awards ===
Year	Nominee / work	Award	Result	Ref.
2015	"I'm Not the Only One"	Pop Award Songs	Won	
2015	"La La La"	Pop Award Songs	Won	
2015	"Latch"	Pop Award Songs	Won	
2015	"Stay with Me"	Pop Award Songs	Won	
2015	"Stay with Me"	Song of the Year	Won	
2016	"Lay Me Down"	Pop Award Songs	Won	
2016	"Like I Can"	Pop Award Songs	Won	
2016	"Writing's on the Wall"	Academy Award Winner	Won	
2017	"Stay with Me"	Million Performance Songs	Won	
2018	"Too Good at Goodbyes"	Pop Award Songs	Won	
2020	"Dancing With A Stranger"	Song of the Year	Won	
2020	"Dancing With A Stranger"	Pop Award Songs	Won	
2020	"How Do You Sleep?"	Pop Award Songs	Won	
2021	"Diamonds"	Pop Award Songs	Won	

=== BMI Pop Awards ===
Year	Nominee / work	Award	Result	Ref.
2015	"Latch"	Publisher of the Year	Won	
2015	"Latch"	Award-Winning Songs	Won	
2015	"Stay with Me"	Publisher of the Year	Won	
2015	"Stay with Me"	Award-Winning Songs	Won	
2016	"I'm Not The Only One"	Publisher of the Year	Won	
2016	"I'm Not The Only One"	Award-Winning Songs	Won	
2017	"Lay Me Down"	Award-Winning Songs	Won	
2020	"Dancing With A Stranger"	Award-Winning Songs	Won	
2021	"How Do You Sleep?"	Award-Winning Songs	Won	
2023	"Love Me More"	Award-Winning Songs	Won	

== Brit Awards ==
The Brit Awards are the British Phonographic Industry's (BPI) annual pop music awards. Smith has received four awards from fourteen nominations.

Year	Nominee / work	Award	Result	Ref.
2014	"La La La"	British Single of the Year	Nominated	
2014	"La La La"	British Video of the Year	Nominated	
2014	Sam Smith	Critics' Choice	Won	
2015	Sam Smith	British Male Solo Artist	Nominated	
2015	Sam Smith	British Breakthrough Act	Won	
2015	Sam Smith	Global Success Award	Won	
2015	"Stay with Me"	British Single of the Year	Nominated	
2015	"Stay with Me"	British Video of the Year	Nominated	
2015	In the Lonely Hour	British Album of the Year	Nominated	
2016	"Writing's On The Wall"	British Video of the Year	Eliminated	
2019	Sam Smith	British Male Solo Artist	Nominated	
2020	"Dancing with a Stranger"	Song of the Year	Nominated	
2023	"Unholy" (with Kim Petras)	Song of the Year	Nominated	
2023	Sam Smith	British Pop/R&B Act	Nominated	
2023	Sam Smith	Brits Billion Award	Won	

== British LGBT Awards ==
The British LGBT Awards celebrate the UK's most loved LGBT personalities, innovators and companies, dubbed the "Gay Oscars" by the press. Smith has nominated four times.

Year	Nominee / work	Award	Result	Ref.
2016	Sam Smith	Music Artist	Won	
2021	Sam Smith	Music Artist	Nominated	
2022	Sam Smith	Music Artist	Nominated	
2024	Sam Smith	Music Artist	Nominated	

== Critics' Choice Movie Awards ==
The Critics' Choice Movie Awards are presented annually since 1995 by the Broadcast Film Critics Association for outstanding achievements in the cinema industry. Smith has received one nomination.

Year	Nominee / work	Award	Result	Ref.
2016	"Writing's On The Wall"	Best Song	Nominated	

== Denver Film Critics Society ==
The Denver Film Critics Society (DFCS) recognizes excellence in cinema, and promote Colorado within the industry. Smith has received one nomination.

Year	Nominee / work	Award	Result	Ref.
2016	"Writing's On The Wall"	Best Original Song	Nominated	

== ECHO Awards ==
Year	Nominee / work	Award	Result	Ref.
2015	Sam Smith	Best International Newcomer	Nominated	

== Elle Style Awards ==
The Elle Style Awards are an awards ceremony hosted annually by the ELLE magazine. Smith has received one award.

Year	Nominee / work	Award	Result	Ref.
2015	Sam Smith	Musician of the Year	Won	

== GAFFA Awards ==
=== GAFFA Awards (Denmark) ===
Delivered since 1991, the GAFFA Awards are a Danish award that rewards popular music by the magazine of the same name.

Year	Nominee / work	Award	Result	Ref.
2014	Themself	Best Foreign New Act	Won	
2018	Themself	Best Foreign Solo Act	Nominated	

=== GAFFA Awards (Sweden) ===
Delivered since 2010, the GAFFA Awards (Swedish: GAFFA Priset) are a Swedish award that rewards popular music awarded by the magazine of the same name.

Year	Nominee / work	Award	Result	Ref.
2014	Themself	Best Foreign New Act	Won	

== Gaygalan Awards ==
Since 1999, the Gaygalan Awards are a Swedish accolade presented by the QX magazine. Smith has received one nomination.

Year	Nominee / work	Award	Result	Ref.
2018	"Too Good At Goodbyes"	Best International Song	Nominated	

== Global Awards ==
The Global Awards are held by Global to honor music played on British radio stations. Smith has received one award.

Year	Nominee / work	Award	Result	Ref.
2018	Sam Smith	Mass Appeal Award	Won	
2019	Sam Smith	Best Male	Nominated	
2019	Sam Smith	Best British Artist or Group	Nominated	
2019	Sam Smith	Mass Appeal Award	Nominated	
2019	"Promises" (with Calvin Harris)	Best Song	Nominated	
2020	Sam Smith	Best British Act	Nominated	
2023	Sam Smith	Best British Act	Nominated	
2023	"Unholy" (with Kim Petras)	Best Song	Nominated	

== GLAAD Media Awards ==
The GLAAD Media Awards were created in 1990 by the Gay & Lesbian Alliance Against Defamation to "recognize and honor media for their fair, accurate and inclusive representations of the LGBT community and the issues that affect their lives." Smith has received three nominations.

Year	Nominee / work	Award	Result	Ref.
2015	Sam Smith	Outstanding Music Artist	Nominated	
2018	Sam Smith	Outstanding Music Artist	Nominated	
2021	Sam Smith	Outstanding Music Artist	Won	

== Golden Globe Awards ==
The Golden Globe Awards is an American accolade bestowed by the 93 members of the Hollywood Foreign Press Association (HFPA), which recognizes excellence in film and television, both domestic and foreign. Smith has won once.

Year	Nominee / work	Award	Result	Ref.
2016	"Writing's on the Wall"	Best Original Song	Won	

== Grammy Awards ==
The Grammy Awards are awarded annually by The Recording Academy of the United States for outstanding achievements in the music industry. Often considered the highest music honour, the awards were established in 1958. Smith has won five awards from seven nominations.

Year	Nominee / work	Award	Result	Ref.
2015	"Stay with Me" (Darkchild Version)	Record of the Year	Won	
2015	"Stay with Me" (Darkchild Version)	Song of the Year	Won	
2015	"Stay with Me" (Darkchild Version)	Best Pop Solo Performance	Nominated	
2015	In the Lonely Hour	Album of the Year	Nominated	
2015	In the Lonely Hour	Best Pop Vocal Album	Won	
2015	Sam Smith	Best New Artist	Won	
2023	"Unholy" (with Kim Petras)	Best Pop Duo/Group Performance	Won	

== Guinness World Records ==
The Guinness World Records is a reference book published annually, containing a collection of world records, both human achievements and the extremes of the natural world. Smith currently holds two records.

Year	Nominee / work	Award	Result	Ref.
2015	In the Lonely Hour	Most Consecutive Weeks in the UK Top 10 Album Charts (69 weeks)	Won	
2015	"Writing's on the Wall"	First James Bond theme to reach No.1 in the UK charts	Won	

== Hollywood Music in Media Awards ==
The Hollywood Music in Media Awards (HMMA) recognizes and honors the music of visual mediums (films, TV, movie trailers, video games, commercials, etc.). Smith has received one nomination.

Year	Nominee / work	Award	Result	Ref.
2015	"Writing's on the Wall"	Song – Feature Film	Nominated	

== Hungarian Music Awards ==
Year	Nominee / work	Award	Result	Ref.
2023	"Unholy" (with Kim Petras)	Foreign Modern Pop-Rock Album or Recording of the Year	Nominated	

== iHeartRadio Music Awards ==
The iHeartRadio Music Awards is an international music awards show founded by iHeartRadio in 2014. Smith has won one award out of eleven nominations.

Year	Nominee / work	Award	Result	Ref.
2015	Sam Smith	Artist of the Year	Nominated	
2015	Sam Smith	Best New Artist	Won	
2015	"Stay with Me"	Song of the Year	Nominated	
2015	"Stay with Me"	Best Lyrics	Nominated	
2016	Sam Smith	Male Artist of the Year	Nominated	
2016	In the Lonely Hour	Album of the Year	Nominated	
2016	"Writing's on the Wall"	Best Song from a Movie	Nominated	
2016	"Hotline Bling"	Best Cover Song	Nominated	
2020	"Dancing With A Stranger" (with Normani)	Best Collaboration	Nominated	
2020	"Dancing With A Stranger" (with Normani)	Best Music Video	Nominated	
2021	"Fix You"	Best Cover Song	Nominated	

== iHeartRadio Titanium Awards ==
iHeartRadio Titanium Awards are awarded to an artist when their song reaches 1 Billion Spins across iHeartRadio Stations.

Year	Nominee/Work		Result	Ref
2020	"Dancing With A Stranger" w/ Normani	1 Billion Total Audience Spins on iHeartRadio Stations	Won	

== International Dance Music Awards ==
The International Dance Music Award was established in 1985. It is a part of the Winter Music Conference, a weeklong electronic music event held annually. Smith has won one awards from three nominations.

Year	Nominee / work	Award	Result	Ref.
2014	"Latch"	Best House/Garage/Deep House Track	Won	
2014	"Latch"	Best Featured Vocalist	Nominated	
2014	"Latch"	Best Music Video	Nominated	
2015	Sam Smith	Best Break-Through Artist (Solo)	Nominated	

== Ivor Novello Awards ==
The Ivor Novello Awards are awarded for songwriting and composing. The awards, named after the Cardiff born entertainer Ivor Novello, are presented annually in London by the British Academy of Songwriters, Composers and Authors (BASCA).

Year	Nominee / work	Award	Result	Ref.
2014	"Latch"	Best Contemporary Song	Nominated	
2015	"Stay with Me"	Most Performed Work	Nominated	
2020	"Dancing With A Stranger"	Most Performed Work	Nominated	

== JUNO Awards ==
The Juno Awards are Canadian awards to recognize outstanding achievements in record industry. Smith has received one award.

Year	Nominee / work	Award	Result	Ref.
2015	In the Lonely Hour	International Album of the Year	Won	

== LOS40 Music Awards ==
The LOS40 Music Awards (formerly Los Premios 40 Principales) is an annual awards established in 2006 by the Spanish music radio Los 40. Smith has received two awards from ten nominations.

Year	Nominee / work	Award	Result	Ref.
2013	"La La La" (with Naughty Boy)	Best International Video	Nominated	
2015	Sam Smith	Best International New Act	Nominated	
2015	"Stay with Me"	Best International Song	Nominated	
2015	In the Lonely Hour	Best International Album	Won	
2019	Sam Smith	Best International Artist	Nominated	
2019	Sam Smith	Golden Music Award	Won	
2021	Love Goes	Best International Album	Nominated	
2023	Sam Smith	Best International Artist	Nominated	
2023	"Unholy"	Best International Song	Nominated	
2023	Gloria	Best International Album	Nominated	

== Melon Music Awards ==
The Melon Music Awards is a South Korean annual awards established in 2009.

Year	Nominee / work	Award	Result	Ref.
2020	"To Die For"	Best Pop Award	Won	

== MOBO Awards ==
The MOBO Awards (an acronym for Music of Black Origin) were established in 1996 by Kanya King. They are held annually in the United Kingdom to recognize artists of any race or nationality performing music of black origin. Smith has received six awards from seven nominations.

Year	Nominee / work	Award	Result	Ref.
2013	Sam Smith	Best Newcomer	Nominated	
2013	"La La La"	Best Song	Won	
2013	"La La La"	Best Video	Won	
2014	In the Lonely Hour	Best Album	Won	
2014	Sam Smith	Best Male Artist	Won	
2014	Sam Smith	Best Soul/R&B Artist	Won	
2014	"Stay with Me"	Best Song	Won	

== MTV Awards ==
=== MTV Europe Music Awards ===
The MTV Europe Music Awards (EMA) were established in 1994 by MTV Networks Europe to celebrate the most popular music videos in Europe. Smith has been nominated four times, winning one.

Year	Nominee / work	Award	Result	Ref.
2014	Sam Smith	Best Push Act	Nominated	
2014	Sam Smith	Best UK and Ireland Act	Nominated	
2014	"Stay with Me"	Best Song	Nominated	
2022	"Unholy"	Video for Good	Won	

=== MTV Italian Music Awards ===
The MTV Italian Music Awards, also known as TRL (Total Request Live) Awards, are held annually in Italy by MTV. Smith has received one nomination.

Year	Nominee / work	Award	Result	Ref.
2015	"Stay with Me"	Best Video	Nominated	

=== MTV Video Music Awards ===
The MTV Video Music Awards, commonly abbreviated as VMA, were established in 1984 by MTV to celebrate the top music videos of the year.

Year	Nominee / work	Award	Result	Ref.
2014	Sam Smith	Artist to Watch	Nominated	
2014	"Stay with Me"	Best Male Video	Nominated	
2023	"Unholy" (with Kim Petras)	Video of the Year	Nominated	
2023	"Unholy" (with Kim Petras)	Song of the Year	Nominated	
2023	"Unholy" (with Kim Petras)	Best Choreography	Nominated	
2023	"Unholy" (with Kim Petras)	Best Direction	Nominated	
2023	"Unholy" (with Kim Petras)	Best Visual Effects	Nominated	

=== MTV Video Music Awards Japan ===
The MTV Video Music Awards Japan was established in 2002 to award the music videos from Japanese and international artists. Smith has received two nominations, winning one

Year	Nominee / work	Award	Result	Ref.
2015	"I'm Not the Only One"	Best Male Video	Nominated	
2023	"Unholy"	Best Collaboration Video (International)	Won	

=== MTVU Woodie Awards ===
Year	Nominee / work	Award	Result	Ref.
2014	Sam Smith	Breaking Woodie	Nominated	
2014	Sam Smith	Cover Woodie	Nominated	
2015	Sam Smith	Woodie of the Year	Nominated	
2015	"How Will I Know"	Cover Woodie	Nominated	

== Nickelodeon Kids' Choice Awards ==
The Nickelodeon Kids' Choice Awards are annual award shows launched by Nickelodeon in several countries.

=== American Nickelodeon Kids' Choice Awards ===
Year	Nominee / work	Award	Result	Ref.
2015	Sam Smith	Favorite Male Singer	Nominated	

== People's Choice Awards ==
The People's Choice Awards is an American awards show recognizing the people and the work of popular culture. The show has been held annually since 1975 and is voted on by the general public. Smith has received four nominations.

Year	Nominee / work	Award	Result	Ref.
2015	Sam Smith	Favorite Male Artist	Nominated	
2015	Sam Smith	Favorite Breakout Artist	Nominated	
2015	"Stay with Me"	Favorite Song	Nominated	
2015	In the Lonely Hour	Favorite Album	Nominated	

== Q Awards ==
The Q Awards are the United Kingdom's annual music awards run by the music magazine Q to honour musical excellence. Winners are voted by readers of Q online, with others decided by a judging panel. Smith won the award once.

Year	Nominee / work	Award	Result	Ref.
2014	Sam Smith	Best New Artist	Won	

== Queerty Awards ==
The Queerties are an annual awards run by the LGBT online magazine Queerty, In which their readers vote for the "Best of LGBTQ Media and Culture". Smith has been nominated for the award four times.

Year	Nominee / work	Award	Result	Ref.
2020	Sam Smith	Closet Door Bustdown	Nominated	
2020	"Dancing with a stranger" (with Normani)	Anthem	Nominated	
2021	"Diamonds"	Anthem	Nominated	

== RTHK International Pop Poll Awards ==
Year	Nominee / work	Award	Result	Ref.
2015	Sam Smith	Top Male Artist	Bronze	
2015	"Stay with Me"	Top Ten International Gold Songs	Won	
2016	"Like I Can"	Top Ten International Gold Songs	Nominated	
2016	Sam Smith	Top Male Artist	Bronze	
2019	Sam Smith	Top Male Artist	Nominated	
2021	"Kids Again"	Top Ten International Gold Songs	Nominated	

== Satellite Awards ==
Voted for by the International Press Academy, the Satellite Awards are held annually and honor achievements in television and film. Smith has received one nomination.

Year	Nominee / work	Award	Result	Ref.
2016	"Writing's on the Wall"	Best Original Song	Nominated	

== Silver Clef Awards ==
The Silver Clef Awards recognise and celebrate the outstanding talent of artists who through their music have touched the lives of many thousands of people.

Year	Nominee / work	Award	Result	Ref.
2019	Sam Smith	Best Male	Won	

== Teen Choice Awards ==
The Teen Choice Awards is an annual awards show that airs on the Fox Network. The awards honor the year's biggest achievements in music, movies, sports, television, fashion and other categories, voted by teen viewers. Smith has received two nominations.

Year	Nominee / work	Award	Result	Ref.
2014	"Latch"	Choice Music: Electronic Music Dance Song	Nominated	
2014	Sam Smith	Choice Summer Music Star: Male	Nominated	
2015	Sam Smith	Choice Music: Male Artist	Nominated	
2015	"Lay Me Down"	Choice Music Single: Male Artist	Nominated	
2019	"Dancing with a Stranger" (with Normani)	Choice Music – Collaboration	Nominated	
2019	"Dancing with a Stranger" (with Normani)	Choice Pop Song	Nominated	

== UK Music Video Awards ==
The UK Music Video Awards is an annual award ceremony founded in 2008 to recognise creativity, technical excellence and innovation in music videos and moving images for music.

Year	Nominee / work	Award	Result	Ref.
2013	"La La La" (with Naughty Boy)	VEVO New Artist Award	Won	
2014	"I'm Not the Only One"	Best Colour Grade in a Video	Nominated	
2014	"Make It to Me"	Best Live Music Coverage	Nominated	
2014	Live at The Roundhouse	Best Music AD - TV or Online	Nominated	
2015	"Lay Me Down"	Best Cinematography in a Video	Nominated	
2015	"Lay Me Down"	Best Pop Video - UK	Nominated	
2018	"Pray" (with Logic)	Best Pop Video - UK	Nominated	
2023	"I'm Not Here to Make Friends"	Best Pop Video - UK	Nominated	

== Video Prisma Awards ==
Year	Nominee / work	Award	Result	Ref.
2023	"I'm Not Here to Make Friends"	Best Art Direction - International	Nominated	

== Young Hollywood Awards ==
Presented by Young Artist Association, a non-profit organization, the Young Artist Awards are held annually to honor young performers. Smith has received one award from three nominations.

Year	Nominee / work	Award	Result	Ref.
2014	"Stay with Me"	Song of the Summer/DJ Replay	Nominated	
2014	Sam Smith	Hottest Music Artist	Nominated	
2014	Sam Smith	Breakout Music Artist	Won	

== YouTube Music Awards ==
The YouTube Music Awards, abbreviated as the YTMA, is an inaugural music award show presented by YouTube. Smith has received one award.

Year	Nominee / work	Award	Result	Ref.
2015	Sam Smith	50 artists to watch	Won	

== ZD Awards ==
Zvukovaya Dorozhka (Russian: Звуковая Дорожка, "sound track") is Russia's oldest hit parade in field of popular music. Since 2003 it is presented in a ceremony in concert halls. It's considered one of the major Russian music awards.

Year	Nominee / work	Award	Result	Ref.
2015	Sam Smith	Best Foreign Act	Nominated	
