= Kick It =

Kick It may refer to:

- "Kick It" (Peaches song), 2003
- "Kick It" (Scrufizzer song), 2013
- "Kick It" (Blackpink song), 2019
- "Kick It" (Lil Nas X song), 2019
- "Kick It" (NCT 127 song), 2020
- "Kick It", a song by Natasha Bedingfield from her 2019 album Roll with Me

== See also ==
- Kickin' It, a comedy television series on Disney XD from 2011 to 2015
- Kicking It, a 2008 documentary film
- "Kickin' It" (After 7 song), a 1992 song by After 7 from Takin' My Time
