= Joanna Eden =

English jazz singer, songwriter and pianist

Joanna Eden is an English jazz singer, songwriter and pianist.

== Biography ==
Eden was born in Lincolnshire into a musical family, the daughter of an RAF bass player, John, and a drama teacher, Diana. She started learning the piano at six and performed her first composition, "Happy December", aged seven.

She obtained a B.A. (Hons) in Creative Arts, majoring in music and drama, at Manchester Metropolitan University. She performed with a local Indie band, Strip, as lead singer and co-writer while also continuing to write and perform solo. Eden relocated to London after college and started working as a singer/pianist in the bars and restaurants of Soho. She married drummer Charlie Price. Eden and Price formed a jazz trio with Dan Boutwood, and this unit worked cruises for Cunard Line and Royal Caribbean International. Subsequently, they worked hotels in Cyprus and the UK.

On returning to the United Kingdom in 1999, Joanna signed her first recording contract with the Black Box label, now owned by Universal Music Group. Her first album, A Little Bird Told Me, was released in the summer of 2000 and launched at Ronnie Scott's Club, it was played on BBC Radio and won enthusiastic reviews from Michael Parkinson, Mojo and others. Eden returned to the studio and the self-penned album My Open Eye was released independently on Eden's Mr. Riddles Music Label in 2005. It was re-released with world-wide distribution via Universal in 2007. The critical success of My Open Eye brought about support slots with Jamie Cullum, Nerina Pallot and the Buena Vista Social Club, and BBC Radio airplay. After tracks from the album were played by Michael Parkinson, her manager obtained support for Eden from the supermarket chains, Waitrose and Tesco. She released her third album, Moving Shadows, an album of covers, in 2007 on the 33 Jazz label. This is a jazz trio album, featuring Charlie and long-term bass collaborator Julie Walkington.

In August 2007, the Joanna Eden trio headlined the fifth Picnic Jazz concert at the Pavilion, Orford, Suffolk. She has since supported the Blockheads and The Blow Monkeys at venues around the UK and continues to headline at Pizza on the Park, Pizza Express Jazzclub and The Stables, in Wavendon which was founded by Cleo Laine and Johnny Dankworth. She teaches music, and her former students include Sam Smith, winner of the BBC's Sound of... 2014.

== Personal life ==
Eden and Price have a daughter, and live in Saffron Walden in Essex.

== Discography ==
Year recorded	Title	Label	Personnel/Notes
1999	A Little Bird Told Me	Black Box	
2005?	My Open Eye	Mr Riddles	With Jim Mullen (guitar), Mick Hutton (bass), Charlie Price (drums), Dan Boutwood (guitar), Alex Tsentides (bass)
2007?	Moving Shadows	33 Jazz	
2012?	Falling Out of Grace		With Ian Wilson (guitar), Steve Gaffney (bass), Charlie Price (drums)

== Sources ==
- Manders, Sarah (7 September 2007). "Joanna's Jazz dreams". BBC Essex.
- "Joanna Eden". Radio 4 Woman's Hour. BBC. 17 May 2007.
