= Hazel Eyes (album) =

Studio album by Sam Smith
- Released: 21 August 2026
- Genre: Folk • country • soul
- Length: 45:33
- Label: Capitol
- Producers: Simon Aldred; Ricky Damian; David Odlum; Ruth O'Mahony Brady; Sam Smith

Sam Smith chronology
Gloria (2023)	Hazel Eyes (2026)

Singles from Hazel Eyes
- 1. "Love Is a Stillness" Released: 14 February 2025; 2. "To Be Free" Released: 24 July 2025; 3. "My Guy" Released: 24 June 2026; 4. "Oh Mother" Released: 22 July 2026; 5. "When He's Gone" Released: 5 August 2026; 6. "Constant Companion" Released: 21 August 2026

Hazel Eyes is the fifth studio album by the English singer and songwriter Sam Smith, released on 21 August 2026 through Capitol Records. The album serves as the follow-up to Gloria (2023). Hazel Eyes received generally positive reviews, with critics praising its intimate sound and describing it as Smith's most confident and fully realised work, shaped by a blend of gospel, blues, soul, folk, and jazz influences.

== Background ==
In October 2025, Smith began their To Be Free residency, performing 24 shows at the Warsaw in Brooklyn between 8 October and 13 December 2025. Between 10 February and 14 March 2026, they staged a further 16 shows at the Castro Theatre in San Francisco. Upcoming dates include a performance on 14 August 2026 at the Telmex Auditorium in Guadalajara and four shows between 17 and 21 August at the National Auditorium in Mexico City. The residency will then move to the United Kingdom, with two shows between 3 and 4 September 2026 at the Albert Hall in Manchester and eight shows between 8 and 19 September at the Coliseum in London.

During the residency, Smith hosted several guest performers, including Ed Sheeran, Norah Jones, Brandi Carlile, Hozier, Kim Petras, and Sienna Spiro, who joined them onstage for select songs. Smith also performed various tracks from Hazel Eyes throughout the residency.

== Recording ==
Hazel Eyes was created alongside Smith's longtime collaborator and friend Simon Aldred, with much of the 12-track album taking shape in New York. Smith co-produced the record with Aldred and David Odlum, working on the songs with collaborators Feist, Shahzad Ismaily, and Rob Moose. The album also includes contributions from Feist and multi-instrumentalist Ismaily, with portions of the sessions held at Electric Lady Studios. A press release described the project as "a heartfelt ode to the city of New York which Sam now calls home".

Smith stated that the album is a special project for them and that they had been writing it for over three years with a very small group of friends. They added: "This album is very personal, and I feel I have deepened myself as an artist through the making of it, through being a producer on the record, to walking alongside this record from the start to the finish and pushing myself at every single turn. This record and this music is incredibly romantic. I've learned so many life lessons through making this album, and I've documented it all through the music".

== Singles ==
On Valentine's Day, 14 February 2025, Smith released "Love Is a Stillness". The single cover features Smith's tortoises, Fish and Chips, and was photographed by Collier Schorr. The music video was directed by Haya Waseem.

On 24 July 2025, they released "To Be Free", a song written with Simon Aldred. Smith described the track as "one vocal and guitar take from start to finish, made complete by the beautiful injection of the incredible choir we've been working with across this new project". They also stated that "To Be Free" had been written five years earlier. The single's artwork, captured by Schorr, features the Hudson River in New York. The music video was filmed at the Warsaw in Brooklyn and directed by (La)Horde. The "To Be Free" / "Love Is a Stillness" 7-inch vinyl was released on 11 November 2025.

While announcing Hazel Eyes on 24 June 2026, Smith released a third single, "My Guy". They stated that they wrote the song with friends on a summer day in New York and added that "in this sometimes cold and distant world, I hope you can feel the love and the closeness of this recording. I tried to capture the glow and the warmth of love in this one, it makes me cry, maybe it will make you feel a little love too." The music video was filmed in New York City and directed by Waseem.

On 22 July 2026, Smith released the album's fourth single, "Oh Mother", featuring the TwoCity Chorus. The fifth single, "When He's Gone", followed on 5 August 2026. "Constant Companion" was released as the sixth single on 21 August 2026, the same day the album was issued. Its accompanying music video, directed by Albert Moya and choreographed by (La)Horde, was filmed in Spain and depicts a queer-themed romantic western narrative.

== Critical reception ==
Professional ratings
Aggregate scores
Source	Rating
Metacritic	78/100
Review scores
Source	Rating
AllMusic	4/5 stars
Pitchfork	6.8/10
Slant Magazine	3.5/5 stars

Hazel Eyes received generally positive reviews from music critics. In Slant Magazine, Jon Negroni described the album as confident and stylistically varied, noting its mix of baroque pop, British folk, gospel, outlaw country, doo-wop, and blues. He wrote that Smith's restrained vocals and acoustic arrangements create an intimate atmosphere. Negroni pointed to "My Guy", the title track, "Constant Companion", and "Oh Mother" for their imagery, scope, and choral elements, concluding that Hazel Eyes presents a mature portrait of queer devotion.

In Pitchfork, Molly Mary O'Brien wrote that Hazel Eyes is Smith's most cohesive album, noting influences from jazz, blues, soul, and Feist. She stated that Smith's shift toward a more fluid production style and collaboration with Simon Aldred resulted in a clear narrative centered on love. O'Brien mentioned "Everlasting Love", "Sugar Rush", "When He's Gone", "Oh Mother", and "Moondance" for their instrumentation, gospel and blues elements, and vocal delivery, concluding that Hazel Eyes reflects Smith's most assured work.

In AllMusic, Andy Kellman described Hazel Eyes as Smith's most accomplished album, noting its intimate tone and blend of gospel, blues, soul, and subtle jazz. He praised the contributions of the TwoCity Chorus and referred to "Constant Companion", "Hold On", "To Be Free", "Everlasting Love", "My Guy", and "Moondance" for their gospel touches, clarity, and instrumentation. Kellman wrote that Hazel Eyes may not produce major hits but stands as Smith's most confident and fully developed album.

== Commercial performance ==
Hazel Eyes debuted at number 21 on the UK Albums Chart with 4,470 album-equivalent units sold in its first week.

== Track listing ==
Hazel Eyes track listing
No.	Title	Writer(s)	Producer(s)	Length
1.	"Everlasting Love"	Sam Smith; Simon Aldred	Smith; Ricky Damian; David Odlum; Tommy Danvers^{[s]}	3:42
2.	"Hazel Eyes"	Smith; Aldred	Smith; Aldred; Odlum	3:53
3.	"Moondance" (featuring Feist)	Smith; Aldred; Leslie Feist	Smith; Aldred; Odlum; Feist^{[a]}; Danvers^{[s]}	4:23
4.	"My Guy"	Smith; Aldred; Feist; Shahzad Ismaily	Smith; Aldred; Odlum; Feist^{[a]}	3:50
5.	"When He's Gone"	Smith; Aldred	Smith; Aldred; Odlum	3:06
6.	"Thief"	Smith; Aldred; Odlum; Ruth O'Mahony Brady	Smith; Aldred; Odlum	4:52
7.	"Love Is a Stillness"	Smith; Aldred; Odlum; O'Mahony Brady	Smith; Aldred; Odlum; O'Mahony Brady	1:55
8.	"Sugar Rush"	Smith; Aldred; Ismaily	Smith; Aldred; Odlum	2:30
9.	"Oh Mother" (featuring the TwoCity Chorus)	Smith; Aldred; Odlum; O'Mahony Brady	Smith; Aldred; Odlum	3:32
10.	"Constant Companion"	Smith; Aldred; Odlum	Smith; Aldred; Odlum	4:51
11.	"Hold On"	Smith; Aldred; Odlum	Smith; Aldred; Odlum; Danvers^{[s]}	4:29
12.	"To Be Free"	Smith; Aldred	Smith; Aldred; Odlum	4:30
Total length:				45:33

=== Notes ===
- ^{^a} signifies an additional producer
- ^{^s} signifies a strings producer

== Personnel ==
Credits were adapted from Tidal.

=== Musicians ===
- Sam Smith – vocals (all tracks), background vocals (tracks 2, 4–6, 8, 9), keyboards (3)
- Simon Aldred – guitar (1–6, 8–12), background vocals (1, 2, 6, 8), percussion (2–4, 6, 8, 9), whistle (7), bass (8)
- David Odlum – bass (2), drum programming (3, 4), percussion (3–5, 8, 9), keyboards (3, 6, 10), whistle (7)
- Ruth O'Mahony Brady – keyboards (1, 2, 4–6, 9–11), background vocals (2, 4–6, 9, 10), percussion (4, 8, 9), strings (4), piano (7), whistle (7), synthesizer effects (9)
- Feist – background vocals (3, 4), drum programming (3), percussion (4)
- Shahzad Ismaily – guitar (1, 3–6, 8, 9, 11), keyboards (1, 3, 4, 8, 11), bass (2–6, 8, 9, 11), percussion (2, 4, 5, 8, 9), drums (6)
- Rosie Danvers – conductor, string arrangement (1, 3, 11); cello (1)
- Zahra Benyounes – violin (1, 3, 11), viola (1)
- Wired Strings – strings (1, 3)
- Dave Guy – trumpet (1, 8)
- Ricky Damian – bass (1)
- Jay Bellerose – percussion (2, 3, 5, 6, 9–11), drums (2, 5, 6, 10, 11)
- The TwoCity Chorus (Note: The TwoCity Chorus consists of singers Ah-med Wallace, Ajanee Hambrick, Allen Bowser, Brandon Pain, Brayla Cook, Bri Hentz, Brianna Turner, Brittney N. Clarke, Chenee Campbell, Cmaze, Dahlia Anderson, Dominic Patrick, Elle Morris, Jakeya Sanders, Jami C Holland, Jhetti Lashley, John Graves, Julian King, Kyng Musik, Mare Floyd, Maryta Fields, Matia Washington, Megan Nicolle, Nio Levon, Seraiah Nicole, Sherri Lynn, Taj Sapp, Trèjah Bostic, and Tyree Miller) – choir vocals (2, 3, 9–12)
- Ladonna Young – background vocals (2, 8, 9), percussion (8)
- Lucita Jules – background vocals (2, 8, 9), percussion (8)
- Rob Moose – strings (2), guitar (10), ukulele (10), violin (10)
- Reuben James – keyboards (3, 4, 6, 8–12)
- Ashok Klouda – cello (3, 11)
- Bryony James – cello (3, 11)
- Kirsten Jenson – cello (3, 11)
- Clifton Harrison – viola (3, 11)
- Emma Owens – viola (3, 11)
- Meghan Cassidy – viola (3, 11)
- Ben Hancox – violin (3, 11)
- Jenny Sacha – violin (3, 11)
- Michael Trainor – violin (3, 11)
- Miles Brett – violin (3, 11)
- Patrick Kiernan – violin (3, 11)
- Raja Halder – violin (3, 11)
- Rod Castro – guitar (3, 11)
- Nate Smith – drums (3)
- Marc Ribot – guitar (3)
- David Leon – saxophone (3)
- Kerenza Peacock – violin (3)
- Natalie Klouda – violin (3)
- Stephanie Cavey – violin (3)
- Gabe Noel – strings (4, 9), bass harmonica (4), Marxophone (9)
- Moses Sumney – background vocals (4)
- Donté McGuine – background vocals (5, 9)
- Earl Harvin – percussion (6)
- Brandon Pain – background vocals (8), percussion (8)
- Kyng Musik – background vocals (8), percussion (8)
- Ian Hendrickson-Smith – saxophone (8)
- Mike Buckley – saxophone (8)
- Trinity Boys Choir (Note: The Trinity Boys Choir consists of singers Alex Bradburn, Alex Pick, Alexander Wright, Ben Wright, Charles Arthanayake, Daniel Pickles, Dennis Lalic, Elliot Bergs, Finn Robotham, Glenn Tong, Hal Heaton, Henry Pettitt, Michael Mulroy, Oliver Griffith, Tom Day, and Xavier Karelis) – choir vocals (10)
- Richard Pryce – double bass (1)
- Charis Jenson – violin (11)
- Hayley Pomfrett – violin (11)
- Sarah Sexton – violin (11)

=== Technical ===
- David Odlum – engineering
- Steve Fitzmaurice – engineering (1–6, 8–12), mixing (7)
- Joseph Lorge – engineering (6)
- Lauren Marquez – additional engineering (1–6, 8–12)
- Varun Jhunjhunwalla – additional engineering (4)
- Andrew Sarlo – mixing (1–6, 8–12)
- Ruairi O'Flaherty – mastering (1–6, 8–12)
- Gavin Lurssen – mastering (7)

== Charts ==
Chart performance
Chart (2026)	Peak position
Australian Albums (ARIA)	37
Austrian Albums (Ö3 Austria)	67
Belgian Albums (Ultratop Flanders)	24
Belgian Albums (Ultratop Wallonia)	26
Dutch Albums (Album Top 100)	30
French Albums (SNEP)	103
German Albums (Offizielle Top 100)	18
German Pop Albums (Offizielle Top 100)	8
Scottish Albums (Official Charts)	14
Spanish Albums (Promusicae)	23
Swiss Albums (Schweizer Hitparade)	11
UK Albums (Official Charts)	21
US Top Album Sales (Billboard)	30

== Release history ==
Release history
Region	Date	Format	Label	Ref.
Various	21 August 2026	CD; digital download; streaming; vinyl	Capitol	
