= Turn Down for What =

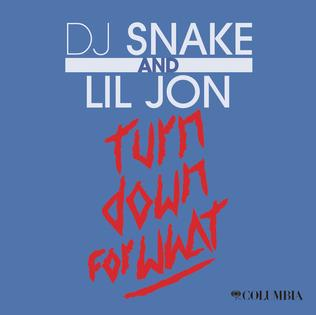

Single by DJ Snake and Lil Jon
- Released: 18 December 2013
- Recorded: 2013
- Genre: EDM; trap
- Length: 3:33
- Label: Columbia
- Songwriters: William Grigahcine; Jonathan Smith; Martin Bresso
- Producers: DJ Snake; Tchami

DJ Snake singles chronology
"Turn Down for What" (2013)	"Get Low" (2014)

Lil Jon singles chronology
"Hard White (Up in the Club)" (2011)	"Turn Down for What" (2013)	"Bend Ova" (2014)

Music video
- "Turn Down For What" on YouTube

"Turn Down for What" is a song by the French producer DJ Snake and the American rapper Lil Jon. It was released on 18 December 2013 as DJ Snake's debut single, making its first album appearance on Furious 7: Original Motion Picture Soundtrack. The song and its viral music video popularized the use of the titular phrase. The song was particularly successful in the US where it was certified 8× Platinum. In late 2020, seven years after it was released, the video passed a billion views on YouTube.

== Production and release ==
Lil Jon and DJ Snake met several years before recording the song. In an interview, DJ Snake said,

When I hit up the big homie Jon and asked him if he wanted to be on the track, this song is a pretty balling song. He heard the beat and was instantly down with the vision. What he sent me back, though, absolutely blew my mind. I knew Jon was one of the best, but he absolutely killed it on this joint.

Lil Jon said in an interview,

DJ Snake sent me the track with a sample and he wanted me to redo it with my voice. When I heard the song I was like this beat is too crazy for that sample. I wanted to make it hip and current, and the first thing that came to mind was the phrase 'Turn Down for What!'

In December 2013, Columbia Records debuted "Turn Down for What" on the label's website. It was released via iTunes shortly afterwards.

== Chart performance ==
"Turn Down for What" entered the Top 10 on Billboard's Dance/Electronic chart during the last week of December. In January 2014, the single entered the Top 5 on the Dance/Electronic chart and debuted at No. 38 on the Billboard Hot 100. It peaked at number 4 on the chart and was certified Gold in February 2014. It reached its first million copies sold in the U.S. in March 2014. It became the seventh best-selling song of 2014 in the US with 3,449,000 copies sold for the year.

== Critical response ==
"Turn Down for What" received generally positive reviews from music critics and publications. Rolling Stone voted "Turn Down for What" as the second best song of the year 2014, saying, "The year's nutsiest party jam was also the perfect protest banger for a generation fed up with everything. DJ Snake brings the synapse-rattling EDM and Southern trap music; Lil Jon brings the dragon-fire holler for a hilarious, glorious, glowstick-punk fuck you." The Guardian music editor Ben Beaumont-Thomas called the song "magnificently shallow" and described it as "three choruses enjambed with energy-ramping bridges, using Lil Jon’s yelling as cement."

"Turn Down for What" was ranked at No. 9, tied with Beyoncé's "Flawless", on The Village Voice's annual year-end Pazz & Jop critics' poll for 2014.

Jon Caramanica of The New York Times named "Turn Down for What" as an example of rappers "with real tension and grit in their voices" pivoting to dance music rather than hip-hop. Caramanica described "Turn Down for What" as a "hyperkinetic banger" but "not the sort of song [Lil Jon] could have made on his own".

In December 2014, a seven-critic panel for Billboard had five with positive feedback, for instance "the perfect club banger" from Myles Tanzer. Of the two with negative feedback, Caitlin White described the song as "clichéd debauchery", and Jillian Mapes called it "totally one-note – almost a novelty song".

== Music video ==
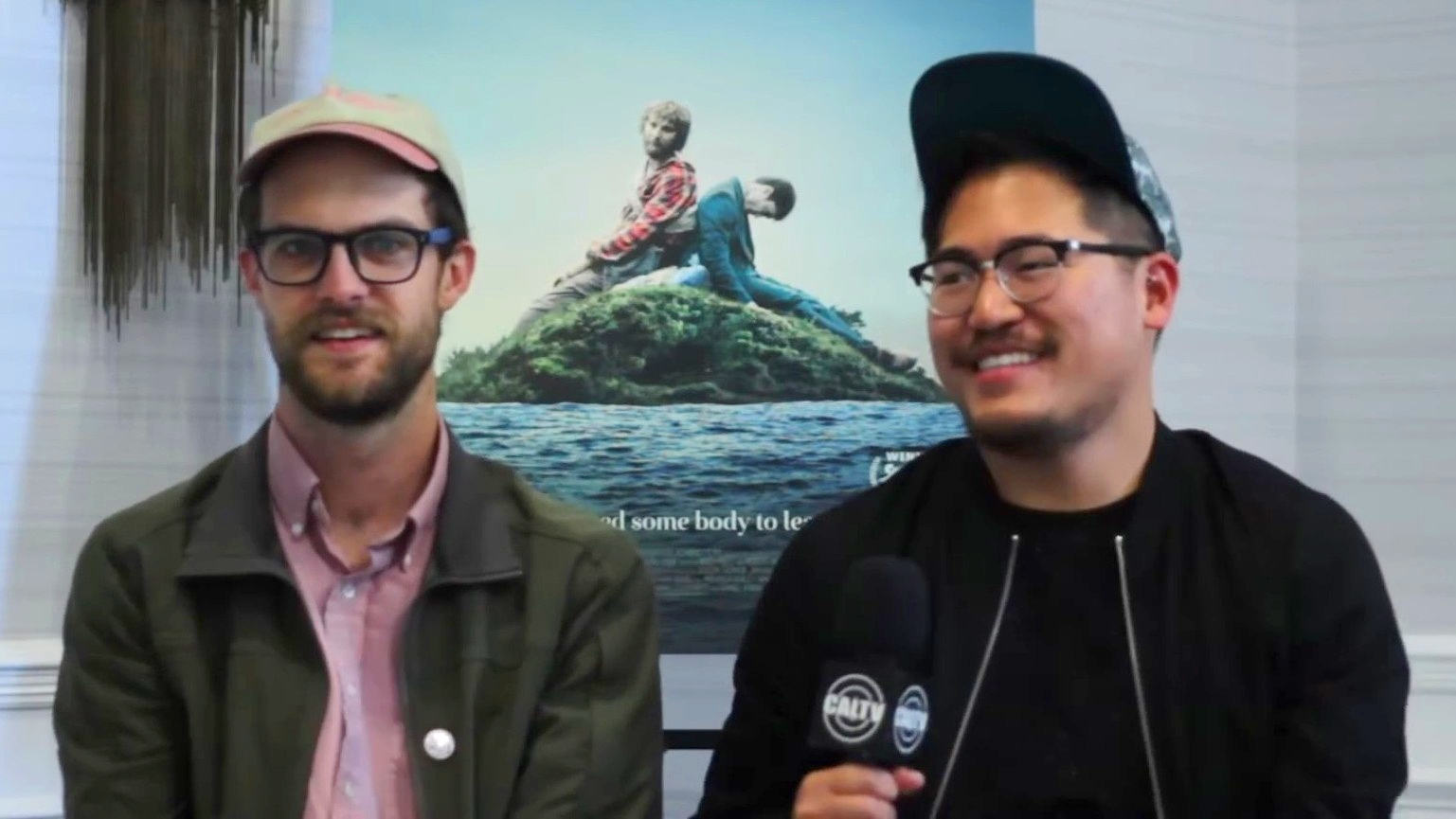
The music video for "Turn Down for What" was directed by Daniel Scheinert and Daniel Kwan

An accompanying music video for "Turn Down for What" was directed by the filmmaking duo Daniels, composed of Daniel Kwan and Daniel Scheinert, and released on 13 March 2014. The clip stars co-director Daniel Kwan with Sunita Mani. He explained: "For a while Daniel and I had been wanting to explore male sexuality in a really weird way. For some reason our brains came up with this image, and this other universe where dudes are so pumped up on their own dicks—and they're so into their testosterone—that the way that they show that is by breaking shit with their dicks. So, whatever happens, that would just be a funny logical progression."

Jason Newman of Rolling Stone described the video as "perfect insanity" and added, "It's hard to pinpoint specifically what makes the video for DJ Snake and Lil Jon's 'Turn Down for What' so compelling and ripe for repeat viewings." Edwin Ortiz of Complex called it "incredibly absurd and awesome" and wrote, "The hard-hitting EDM record delivers an undeniable vibe that listeners can't help but mosh out to, and that's clearly evident in the accompanying music video." Writing for Idolator, Robbie Daw said the video "takes things to a whole new level of WTF-ness not quite seen before."

== Remixes ==
On 26 April 2014, an official remix featuring Juicy J, 2 Chainz, and French Montana was released. A second official remix, the "Dancehall Remix", followed on 28 April 2014, featuring Chi Ching Ching, Assassin, and Konshens. A third remix was released on 7 May 2014, titled "Turn Down for What (Lil Jon Remix)", featuring Pitbull and Ludacris.

== Awards ==
The music video won Video of the Year and Best Dance Video-International at the UK Music Video Awards held in London. It also received 3 additional nominations.

The music video won Best Direction at the 2014 MTV Video Music Awards (VMAs) held in Inglewood. It also received 3 additional nominations for MTV Clubland Award, Best Visual Effects and Best Art Direction.

The music video was nominated at the 2015 Grammy's for Best Music Video held in Los Angeles.

The song was nominated for Choice Music: R&B/Hip-Hop Song at the 2014 Teen Choice Awards held in Los Angeles.

The song won a Billboard Music Award for Top Dance/Electronic Song at the 2015 Billboard Music Awards held in Vegas and the music video won the Clio Bronze in Film and Music at the 2015 Clio Awards.

== Usage in media ==
"Turn Down for What" has been featured in various films, commercials and television programs. Uses include a TV commercial for Sol Republic, to introduce a wireless speaker, which aired in October 2013. The song was used in the films 22 Jump Street, Furious 7, Alvin and the Chipmunks: The Road Chip and The Angry Birds Movie 2, and in the trailers for Horrible Bosses 2 and Brick Mansions. The song was also used in a TV spot for the 2019 film, Pokémon Detective Pikachu. In May 2014, Jimmy Fallon, Seth Rogen and Zac Efron danced dressed as girls to the song during an episode of The Tonight Show Starring Jimmy Fallon. In July 2014, Robin Wright also danced to the song during an appearance on The Tonight Show.

In October 2014, Lil Jon and various other celebrities appeared in an online video that featured a remix of the song, renamed to "Turn Out for What", that was organized by Rock the Vote and intended to encourage young people to vote in the upcoming elections. Also that month, Michelle Obama posted a video clip of herself dancing to "Turn Down for What" while holding a turnip as a Vine response to US comedian and impressionist Iman Crosson's post hashtagged #AskTheFirstLady. In Alphacat's original post Michelle Obama was asked, "On average how many calories do you burn every time you 'turn up'?!" Her response was "Turnip for what?" The Vine was posted as part of a Q&A organized by the First Lady's office to promote her Let's Move! healthy lifestyle campaign.

In December 2014, a portion of the song was used in an AT&T Wireless commercial announcing the "completion" of their network export's goal of providing improved LTE connectivity.

In April 2017, the song was featured in a Saturday Night Live commercial parody called "Turtle Shirt".

In November 2017, "Turn Down for What?" was the title of a research paper in the American Journal of Transplantation written by Mary Grace Bowring, Dorry Segev and colleagues, about the decision to turn down offers of certain deceased donor kidneys for transplantation.

In January 2018, figure skater Jimmy Ma started using the song in his routine.

In 2021, "Turn Down for What" was used as the soundtrack in a series of TV commercials for British Gas which focused on sustainability.

Lil Jon performed the song as a guest at the Super Bowl LVIII halftime show.

In 2024, Lil Jon performed "Turn Down for What" at the 2024 Democratic National Convention during Georgia's roll call as part of the nomination of Kamala Harris and Tim Walz. DJ Snake posted his disapproval of the song's use for a political end.

== Charts ==
=== Weekly charts ===
Chart (2014–2015)	Peak position
Australia (ARIA)	13
Austria (Ö3 Austria Top 40)	35
Belgium (Ultratop 50 Flanders)	41
Belgium Dance (Ultratop Flanders)	39
Belgium (Ultratop 50 Wallonia)	18
Belgium Dance (Ultratop Wallonia)	10
Canada Hot 100 (Billboard)	11
Canada CHR/Top 40 (Billboard)	8
Czech Republic Singles Digital (ČNS IFPI)	34
Finland (Suomen virallinen lista)	13
France (SNEP)	19
Germany (GfK)	31
Ireland (IRMA)	42
Lebanon (Lebanese Top 20)	5
Netherlands (Dutch Top 40)	21
Netherlands (Single Top 100)	23
New Zealand (Recorded Music NZ)	10
Scottish Singles Sales (Official Charts)	20
Slovakia Airplay (ČNS IFPI)	58
Slovakia Singles Digital (ČNS IFPI)	41
Sweden (Sverigetopplistan)	26
Switzerland (Schweizer Hitparade)	36
UK Singles (Official Charts)	23
UK Dance (Official Charts)	10
US Billboard Hot 100	4
US Hot Dance/Electronic Songs (Billboard)	1
US Pop Airplay (Billboard)	5
US R&B/Hip-Hop Airplay (Billboard)	30
US Rhythmic Airplay (Billboard)	1

=== Year-end charts ===
Chart (2014)	Position
Australia (ARIA)	49
Belgium (Ultratop Wallonia)	83
Canada (Canadian Hot 100)	46
France (SNEP)	74
Germany (Official German Charts)	97
Netherlands (Dutch Top 40)	99
Netherlands (Single Top 100)	62
New Zealand (Recorded Music NZ)	40
Sweden (Sverigetopplistan)	79
UK Singles (OCC)	96
US Billboard Hot 100	15
US Hot Dance/Electronic Songs (Billboard)	1
US Mainstream Top 40 (Billboard)	38
US Rhythmic (Billboard)	11

Chart (2015)	Position
US Hot Dance/Electronic Songs (Billboard)	52

=== Decade-end charts ===
Chart (2010–2019)	Position
US Hot Dance/Electronic Songs (Billboard)	12

== Certifications ==
Region	Certification	Certified units/sales
Australia (ARIA)	2× Platinum	140,000^{^}
Austria (IFPI Austria)	Gold	15,000^{*}
Canada (Music Canada)	7× Platinum	560,000^{‡}
Germany (BVMI)	3× Gold	450,000^{‡}
Italy (FIMI)	Platinum	50,000^{‡}
Mexico (AMPROFON)	Gold	30,000^{*}
New Zealand (RMNZ)	2× Platinum	30,000^{*}
Spain (Promusicae)	Gold	30,000^{‡}
Sweden (GLF)	Platinum	40,000^{‡}
United Kingdom (BPI)	Platinum	600,000^{‡}
United States (RIAA)	8× Platinum	8,000,000^{‡}
Streaming
Denmark (IFPI Danmark)	Platinum	2,600,000^{†}
^{*} Sales figures based on certification alone.^{^} Shipments figures based on certification alone.^{‡} Sales+streaming figures based on certification alone.^{†} Streaming-only figures based on certification alone.
