= To Be Free (tour) =

2025-2026 concert tour by Sam Smith

- Tour by Sam Smith
- Associated album: Hazel Eyes
- Start date: 8 October 2025
- End date: 19 September 2026
- No. of shows: 55 in total
- Producer: Live Nation

Sam Smith concert chronology
- Gloria the Blackout (2024); To Be Free (2025–2026)

The To Be Free is the fifth headlining concert tour by the English singer and songwriter Sam Smith, launched in support of their fifth studio album, Hazel Eyes (2026). The tour began on 8 October 2025 at Warsaw in New York City and is scheduled to conclude on 19 September 2026 at London Coliseum in England.

Produced and promoted by Live Nation Entertainment, the tour represents Smith's continued shift toward more intimate and emotionally focused live performances following their arena and festival runs of previous years. Announced on 24 July 2025 through Smith's Instagram channels alongside the release campaign for the single "To Be Free", the project was introduced as a more stripped-back and immersive concert experience centered on vocal performance, acoustic arrangements, and closeness between artist and audience.

== Background ==
Following the conclusion of Gloria era performances and subsequent live appearances, Smith entered a new creative period marked by a return to minimalist production and emotionally intimate songwriting. The release of "To Be Free" on 24 July 2025 introduced this artistic direction publicly and served as the foundation for both the album and accompanying tour. Public statements surrounding the release described the song as originating from an earlier writing period but ultimately being held for a project that better reflected its emotional tone.

The first performances under the To Be Free banner began as a residency at Warsaw in Brooklyn, a deliberate contrast to Smith's previous arena-scale productions. Media coverage emphasized the reduced venue capacity and intimate staging, presenting the performances as a reintroduction of Smith's catalogue through quieter instrumentation and direct audience connection.

As demand expanded beyond the initial residency concept, additional dates were announced throughout 2026, transforming the project into a continent-spanning tour across North America and Latin America.

== Tour dates ==
List of 2025 concerts
Date (2025)	City	Country	Venue
8 October	New York	United States	Warsaw
10 October	New York	United States	Warsaw
11 October	New York	United States	Warsaw
15 October	New York	United States	Warsaw
17 October	New York	United States	Warsaw
18 October	New York	United States	Warsaw
21 October	New York	United States	Warsaw
22 October	New York	United States	Warsaw
24 October	New York	United States	Warsaw
29 October	New York	United States	Warsaw
30 October	New York	United States	Warsaw
31 October	New York	United States	Warsaw
19 November	New York	United States	Warsaw
21 November	New York	United States	Warsaw
22 November	New York	United States	Warsaw
24 November	New York	United States	Warsaw
26 November	New York	United States	Warsaw
28 November	New York	United States	Warsaw
29 November	New York	United States	Warsaw
3 December	New York	United States	Warsaw
5 December	New York	United States	Warsaw
6 December	New York	United States	Warsaw
10 December	New York	United States	Warsaw
12 December	New York	United States	Warsaw
13 December	New York	United States	Warsaw

List of 2026 concerts
Date (2026)	City	Country	Venue
10 February	San Francisco	United States	Castro Theatre
11 February	San Francisco	United States	Castro Theatre
13 February	San Francisco	United States	Castro Theatre
14 February	San Francisco	United States	Castro Theatre
17 February	San Francisco	United States	Castro Theatre
18 February	San Francisco	United States	Castro Theatre
20 February	San Francisco	United States	Castro Theatre
21 February	San Francisco	United States	Castro Theatre
24 February	San Francisco	United States	Castro Theatre
27 February	San Francisco	United States	Castro Theatre
28 February	San Francisco	United States	Castro Theatre
4 March	San Francisco	United States	Castro Theatre
10 March	San Francisco	United States	Castro Theatre
11 March	San Francisco	United States	Castro Theatre
13 March	San Francisco	United States	Castro Theatre
14 March	San Francisco	United States	Castro Theatre
14 August	Guadalajara	Mexico	Telmex Auditorium
17 August	Mexico City	Mexico	Auditorio Nacional
18 August	Mexico City	Mexico	Auditorio Nacional
20 August	Mexico City	Mexico	Auditorio Nacional
21 August	Mexico City	Mexico	Auditorio Nacional
3 September	Manchester	England	Albert Hall
4 September	Manchester	England	Albert Hall
8 September	London	England	London Coliseum
9 September	London	England	London Coliseum
11 September	London	England	London Coliseum
12 September	London	England	London Coliseum
15 September	London	England	London Coliseum
16 September	London	England	London Coliseum
18 September	London	England	London Coliseum
19 September	London	England	London Coliseum
