= Bored Nothing =

Australian musician

- Born: Fergus David Edward Miller; 3 October 1990; Geelong
- Died: 9 October 2016 (aged 26) Melbourne, Victoria, Australia
- Genres: Indie rock; noise pop; shoegazing; lo-fi
- Occupations: Singer-songwriter; record producer
- Instruments: Guitar; drums; bass guitar; keyboard; vocals; violin; synthesiser
- Years active: 2010–2016
- Labels: Spunk/Cooperative; Caroline
- Formerly of: Major Leagues; Pansy; Wedding Ring Bells

Fergus David Edward Miller (3 February 1990 – 9 October 2016), known professionally as Bored Nothing (2012–2014), was an Australian musician. He released a self-titled album in October 2012. It received some international attention and together with his band Miller had toured internationally. Bored Nothing's second album, Some Songs, appeared in October 2014. Miller committed suicide after bouts of depression.

== Career ==
Fergus Miller was based in Melbourne. He listed his influences as My Bloody Valentine, Brian Jonestown Massacre and Elliott Smith. As a teenager he developed an interest in music and "started making little demos." He acquired an "old 4-track I got for cheap" and began to share them with friends. He put them "on disc and leaving them around in pubs and record stores," and self-released the material through various outlets and formats including Bandcamp, CD-R and compact cassettes.

Recording as Bored Nothing, Miller signed to Spunk records in 2012. His debut was a self-titled 14-track album released via Spunk/Cooperative Music in October. Miller plays "every [instrument] on the album (save one guitar part and a keyboard line), as well as recording and producing the thing at home." He began recording tracks in 2011, towards the end of 2012 he collected nine from previous releases in addition to five new ones, specifically recorded for Bored Nothing.

The album received an international release in April 2013 while a track, "I Wish You Were Dead", was made available as a stream, and a music video, "Let Down", directed by Abteen Bagheri, appeared in September. At Metacritic his album received an average score of 70, based on seven reviews. Bored Nothing received generally positive reviews from music critics with some negative comments. AllMusic's Tim Sendra felt, "[he is] the head of the '90s revival class. From the beginning, it's easy to see that he has a firm grasp on the things that made the indie rock of the time so good." Kat Waplington of Drowned in Sound observed, "[it has] little more than apathetic melancholy with scant musical interest to back it up."

In August 2014 Miller announced the release of his second Bored Nothing album, Some Songs, preceded by the single, "Ice-Cream Dreams". Sendra noticed the album, "[has] a fair balance of hissy ballads that sound like they were recorded with Elliott Smith's ghost perched on his shoulder and shambling pop songs that have sneaky big hooks, [it] has a nice, relaxed flow and depth that represent a step forward in every way."

Bored Nothing played its final show at The Northcote Social Club on 10 January 2015 and was retired. Miller then worked with other projects, including sound mixing on Major Leagues' second EP, Dream States (2015), in Brisbane. Followed by his next solo vehicle, Wedding Ring Bells, back in Melbourne, which he described, "it's more about embracing the quieter songs. I've spent years playing loud music and I wanted to get back to the intimacy of playing mostly by myself."

Miller and his wife, Anna Davidson (of Major Leagues) formed a duo, Pansy, which performed on 7 October 2016 at the Post Office Hotel, Coburg. Mapado writer described how, "their sound is 100% home made and full to the brim with gloomy bedroom-pop vibrations."

== Death ==
On 9 October 2016, Fergus Miller, after another bout of depression, committed suicide at the age of 26. He is survived by his wife, Anna Davidson. Tributes from other Australian bands were received including Major Leagues and the John Steel Singers. In November 2016 Bored Nothing were listed by Triple J as one of the top 100 best discoveries of the last decade from their Unearthed scheme.

== Style ==
Miller's vocals and delivery received immediate comparisons to Elliott Smith, especially on acoustic tracks like "Get Out of Here" and "Charlie's Creek". However the composition of his music is often considered shoegaze or dream pop with its layered vocals, reverb and fuzzy guitars. Critics have made comparisons to fellow shoegaze artists Ride, Silversun Pickups, Teenage Fanclub and My Bloody Valentine.

== Bored Nothing Band ==
Although Miller was the sole writer, recorder and producer of the band's music, Bored Nothing Band, comprised several people he had brought on board over the duration of his live performance career.

- Lead Vocals, Rhythm Guitar – Fergus Miller
- Drums – Jamie King-Holden
- Lead Guitar – Gary Valenta
- Bass – Harrison Miller Carr (Miller's younger brother)

== Discography ==
=== Albums ===
- Bored Nothing (Cooperative Music, 29 October 2012)
  1. Shit for Brains – 3:03
  2. Popcorn – 3:58
  3. Just Another Maniac – 3:33
  4. Bliss – 5:04
  5. Darcy – 1:58
  6. I Wish You Were Dead – 4:04
  7. Echo Room – 2:49
  8. Get Out of Here – 2:44
  9. Let Down – 4:14
  10. Snacks – 3:41
  11. Charlie's Creek – 4:55
  12. Only Old – 3:16
  13. Build a Bridge – 3:30
  14. Dragville, TN – 2:22
- Some Songs (Spunk, 20 October 2014)
  1. Not
  2. Ice-cream Dreams
  3. The Rough
  4. We Lied
  5. Ultra-lites
  6. Do What You Want, Always
  7. Why Were You Dancing with all Those Guys
  8. Where Would I Begin
  9. Come Back To
  10. Song for Jedder
  11. Don't Get Sentimental
  12. Artificial Flower
  13. Ultra-lites II

=== Extended plays ===
- BN (self-released, 2012)
  1. Just Another Maniac – 3:33
  2. Charlie's Creek – 4:57
  3. Only Old – 3:17
  4. We Swim – 5:18
  5. Pay For My Drugs – 4:10
  6. Lover's Croon – 3:49
- Thanks for the Mammaries (self-released, 2013)
  1. Slipped Between The Seams – 2:15
  2. Just Because – 2:47
  3. Dial Tone Blues – 2:41
  4. Stuck – 2:32
