= Sam Smith =

English singer and songwriter (born 1992)

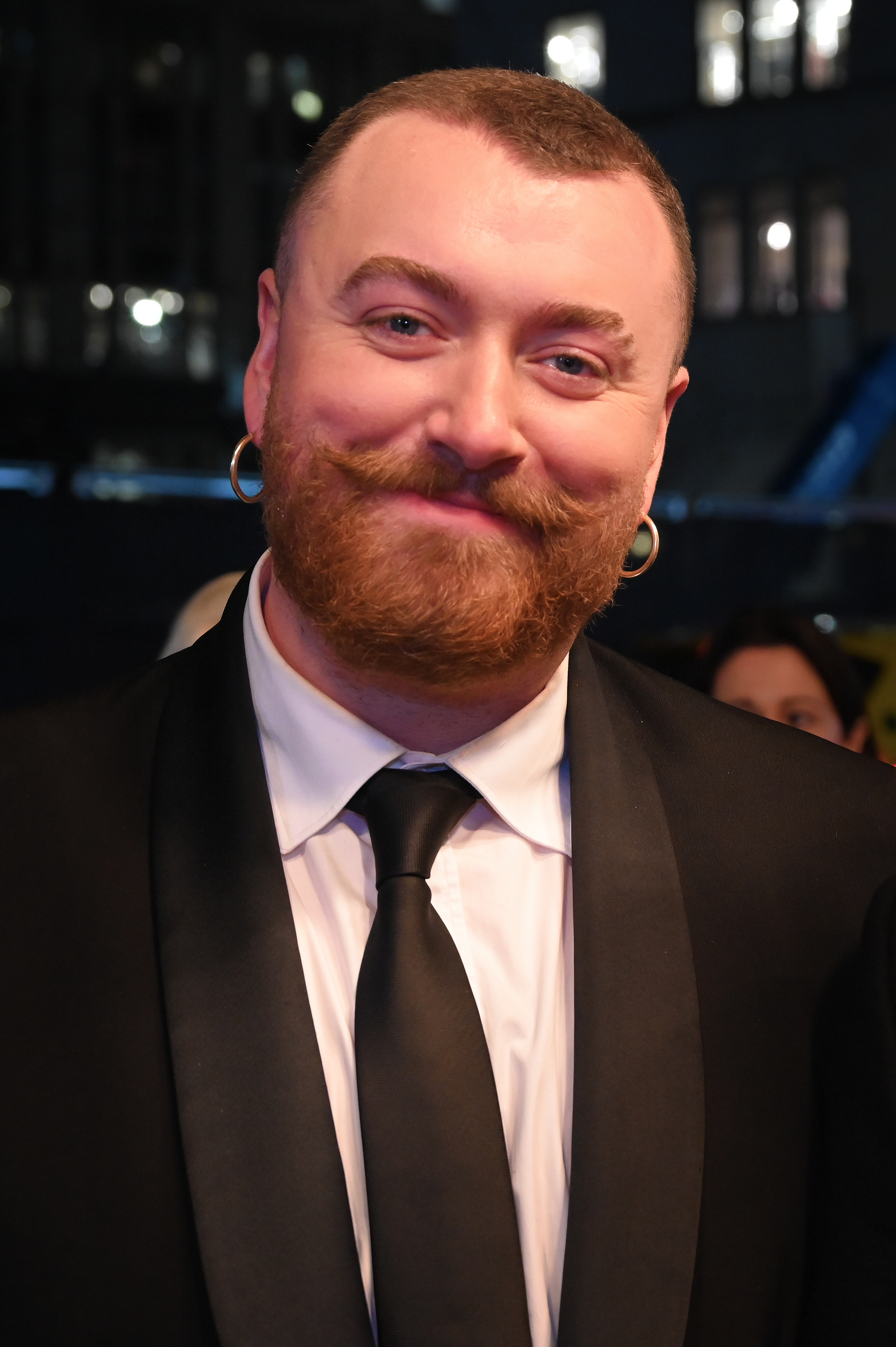
- Smith at the St. James Theatre in Manhattan, New York City, 2025
- Born: Samuel Frederick Smith; 19 May 1992 (age 34); London, England
- Education: St Mary's Catholic School, Bishop's Stortford
- Occupations: Singer; songwriter
- Years active: 2007–present
- Works: Discography
- Partner(s): Christian Cowan (2022–present; engaged)
- Relatives: Lily Allen (third cousin)
- Awards: Full list
- Musical career
- Origin: Great Chishill, Cambridgeshire, England
- Genres: Pop; soul; dance; R&B
- Instrument: Vocals
- Labels: Capitol; EMI; Polydor
- Website: samsmithworld.com

Signature
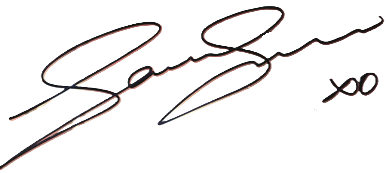

Samuel Frederick Smith (born 19 May 1992) is an English singer and songwriter. In 2012, they (Note: Smith is non-binary and uses they/them pronouns.) rose to prominence when they featured on electronic music duo Disclosure's breakthrough single "Latch", which peaked at No. 11 on the UK singles chart. The following year, they featured on record producer Naughty Boy's single "La La La", which became a number one single in the UK.

Smith's debut studio album, In the Lonely Hour (2014), was released by Capitol Records UK and debuted at number one on the UK Albums Chart. The album's lead single, "Lay Me Down", was released prior to "La La La". The album's second single, "Money on My Mind", became their second number one single in the UK. Its third single, "Stay with Me", was internationally successful, reaching number one in the UK and number two on the US Billboard Hot 100, while subsequent singles "I'm Not the Only One" and "Like I Can" reached the top ten in the UK. The album won four awards at the 57th Annual Grammy Awards, including Best Pop Vocal Album, Best New Artist, Record of the Year, Song of the Year, and nominations for Album of the Year and Best Pop Solo Performance.

Smith's song "Writing's on the Wall" served as the theme for the James Bond film Spectre (2015), and won Smith a Golden Globe Award and an Academy Award for Best Original Song. Smith's second studio album, The Thrill of It All (2017), debuted atop the UK and US album charts. The album's lead single, "Too Good at Goodbyes", reached number one in the UK and Australia and number four in the US. Following the 2018 single "Promises" (with the Scottish DJ and record producer Calvin Harris), which peaked at number one in the UK, Smith released "Dancing with a Stranger" (with the American singer Normani) in 2019, which peaked within the top ten in the UK and the US, also receiving a nomination for Song of the Year at the Brit Awards 2020. The singles, along with "How Do You Sleep?", would precede the release of their third studio album, Love Goes (2020). In 2022, Smith's single "Unholy" (with the German singer Kim Petras), would become their first number one single in the US and won the Grammy Award for Best Pop Duo/Group Performance. The song would precede their fourth studio album, Gloria (2023).

Smith's numerous accolades include five Grammy Awards, three Brit Awards, three Billboard Music Awards, and an American Music Award, as well as a Golden Globe and an Academy Award. On the UK Albums Chart, In the Lonely Hour was the best-selling debut album of the 2010s and the sixth best-selling album of the decade, while collectively Smith's albums spent the fourth-most weeks at number one in the 2010s, behind Ed Sheeran, Adele and Eminem. Smith is the first openly non-binary musician to both release a song that reached No. 1 on the Billboard Hot 100 and to win a Grammy Award.

== Early life ==
Samuel Frederick Smith was born in London on 19 May 1992 to Frederick Smith and broker Kate Cassidy. Smith grew up in the village of Great Chishill in Cambridgeshire, where they attended Thomas More Primary School. They are the third cousin of the singer-songwriter and actress Lily Allen.

They were bullied for having breasts as a child and underwent liposuction at age 12. As part of Youth Music Theatre UK, Smith appeared in the troupe's 2007 production of Oh! Carol, a musical featuring the music of Neil Sedaka. Before entering the musical theatre, they had been in jazz bands. While studying singing and songwriting under jazz pianist Joanna Eden for a number of years, Smith attended St Mary's Catholic School in Bishop's Stortford, Hertfordshire and was a member of the Bishop's Stortford Junior Operatics (now Bishop's Stortford Musical Theatre Society) and the Cantate Youth Choir. Smith attended the Anglican church St Mary the Virgin in Saffron Walden, Essex, with family members, as a youth. Smith released two singles, "Bad Day All Week" in 2008 and "When It's Alright" in 2009.

== Career ==
=== 2012–2016: In the Lonely Hour ===
Smith was featured on the Disclosure song "Latch", which was released on 8 October 2012 and peaked at No. 11 on the UK singles chart. In February 2013, Smith released the first single from their debut studio album, "Lay Me Down", and later in the year featured on Naughty Boy's single "La La La". It was released on 19 May 2013 and peaked at No. 1 on the UK singles chart. Smith's debut extended play (EP) Nirvana was released the following year. The first song on the EP, titled "Safe with Me", is produced by Two Inch Punch and was first broadcast on MistaJam's BBC Radio 1Xtra show on 24 July 2013. The second song on the EP is titled "Nirvana" and is produced by Craze & Hoax and Jonathan Creek. The EP also includes Smith's acoustic solo version of "Latch" and a live version of "I've Told You Now". Smith released the Disclosure, Nile Rodgers, and Jimmy Napes collaboration "Together" on 25 November 2013 as the only single from Settle: The Remixes. In December 2013, Smith was nominated for the Brit Critics' Choice Award 2014 and the BBC's Sound of 2014 poll, winning both.

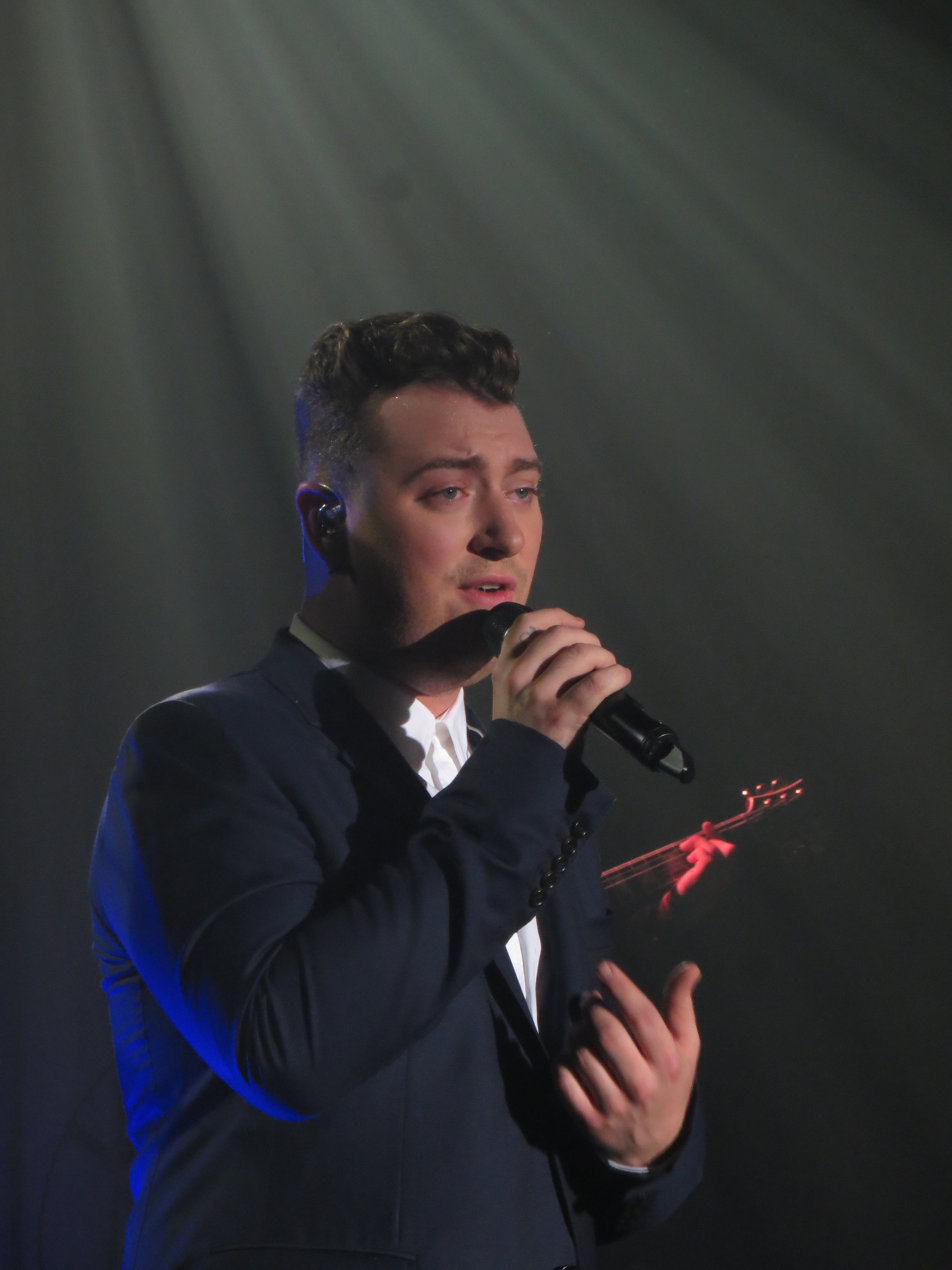
Smith performing at the O_{2} Academy Glasgow in 2014

The second single from Smith's debut studio album, titled "Money on My Mind", was released on 16 February 2014. It was announced on 16 December that Smith's debut studio album, titled In the Lonely Hour, would be released on 26 May 2014 through Capitol Records UK. Smith described the album as "all about unrequited love" stemming from personal experience, having never been loved back by any previous love interests. The album reached number one in the UK Albums Chart and number two on the US Billboard 200, and by 5 November it had become the second biggest selling album of 2014 in the US behind only 1989 by Taylor Swift. In January 2015, In the Lonely Hour was named the second best selling album of 2014 in the UK, behind x by Ed Sheeran.

A live version of album track "I've Told You Now", performed at St Pancras Old Church in St Pancras, London, was made available as a free download as part of an Amazon.com promotion on 27 December 2013. The album track "Make It to Me", co-written by Howard of Disclosure and Jimmy Napes, was made available as a free download as part of an iTunes Store promotion on 13 January 2014. Smith went on their debut American headlining tour in the second quarter of 2014, with a setlist of primarily new material. On 20 January 2014, Smith made their American television debut performing "Latch" with Disclosure on Late Night with Jimmy Fallon. Smith also performed on Saturday Night Live (SNL) on 29 March 2014, performing the gospel-tinged "Stay with Me" and an acoustic version of "Lay Me Down". "Stay with Me" reached number one on the UK singles chart and number two on the US Billboard Hot 100. The fourth single from the album, "I'm Not the Only One", reached No. 3 in the UK and No. 5 in the US. Smith performed "Stay With Me" live at the 2014 MTV Video Music Awards on 24 August at The Forum in Inglewood, California. On 15 November 2014, they joined the charity group Band Aid 30 along with other British and Irish pop acts, recording the latest version of the track "Do They Know It's Christmas?" at Sarm West Studios in Notting Hill, London, to raise money for the Western African Ebola epidemic.

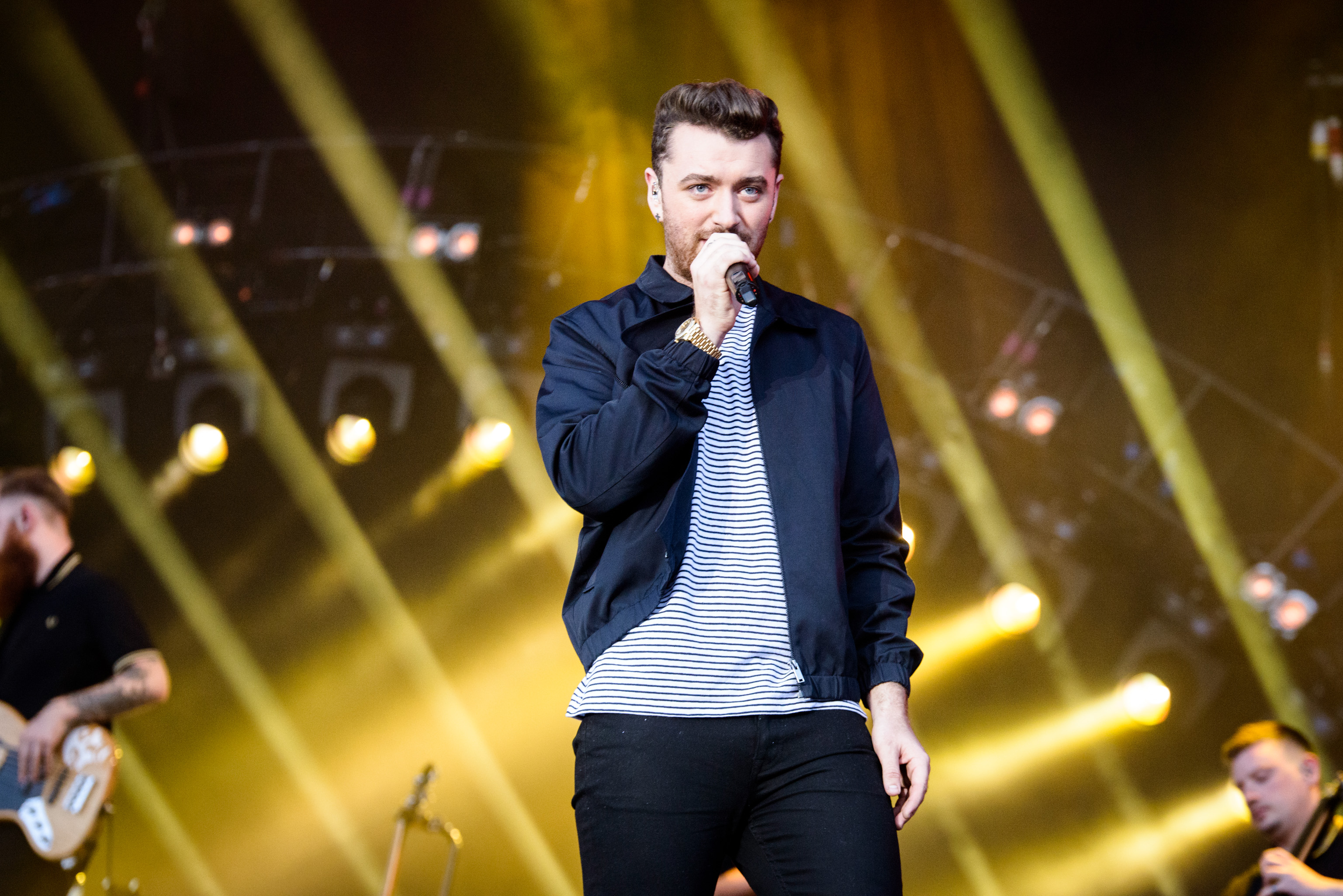
Smith performing "Stay with Me" at Lollapalooza at Berlin Tempelhof Airport in Germany, 2015

In 2015, it came to light that the American singer Tom Petty, noting similarities between "Stay with Me" and his 1989 hit song "I Won't Back Down", had negotiated an out-of-court settlement with Smith in October 2014. Petty and co-composer Jeff Lynne were awarded 12.5 percent of the royalties from "Stay with Me", and the names of Petty and Lynne joined James John Napier (known professionally as Jimmy Napes) in the ASCAP song credit. At the 57th Annual Grammy Awards, held on 8 February 2015, at the Staples Center in Los Angeles, California, Smith performed "Stay with Me" and also received four Grammy Awards: Best New Artist, Record of the Year and Song of the Year (for "Stay with Me") and Best Pop Vocal Album (for In the Lonely Hour). At the Brit Awards 2015 held at The O2 Arena in Greenwich, London on 25 February, they performed "Lay Me Down", and won the Brit Awards for British Breakthrough Act, and Global Success. In March 2015, "Lay Me Down" was re-released as the sixth single from the album, peaking at No. 8 on the Billboard Hot 100 (Smith's third US top 10 single). The same month, Smith recorded another version of the song, featuring John Legend, for the British charity telethon Comic Relief, which reached number one in the UK. At the 2015 Billboard Music Awards on 17 May, Smith received three Billboard Awards: Top Male Artist, Top New Artist, and Top Radio Songs Artist. They featured on Disclosure's single "Omen", which was released on 27 July 2015.

On 8 September 2015, Smith and Jimmy Napes confirmed that they had composed "Writing's on the Wall", the theme song to Spectre, the 24th James Bond film. The song was released on 25 September 2015 and became the first James Bond theme to reach number one in the UK. On 19 October, Smith was presented with two Guinness World Records—one for recording the first James Bond theme song to go to number one in the UK and another for scoring the most consecutive weeks in the UK top 10 by a debut album, for In the Lonely Hour.

At the 73rd Golden Globes on 10 January 2016, they received the Award for Best Original Song for "Writing's on the Wall". On 14 January, the song earned Smith an Academy Award nomination for Best Original Song. In the nominations for the Brit Awards 2016 announced on 14 January, the song was among the nominees for Best British Video. Smith performed "Writing's on the Wall" at the Academy Awards on 28 February and, along with Napes, collected the prize for Best Original Song. In their acceptance speech, Smith referenced an article by actor Ian McKellen published before the awards ceremony that claimed no openly gay man had won an Oscar for Best Actor; Smith misquoted McKellen as saying that no gay man in general had won an Oscar. This was quickly discredited by openly gay recipient Dustin Lance Black, but McKellen mentioned that the error "doesn't detract" from Smith's achievement.

=== 2017–2021: The Thrill of It All and Love Goes ===
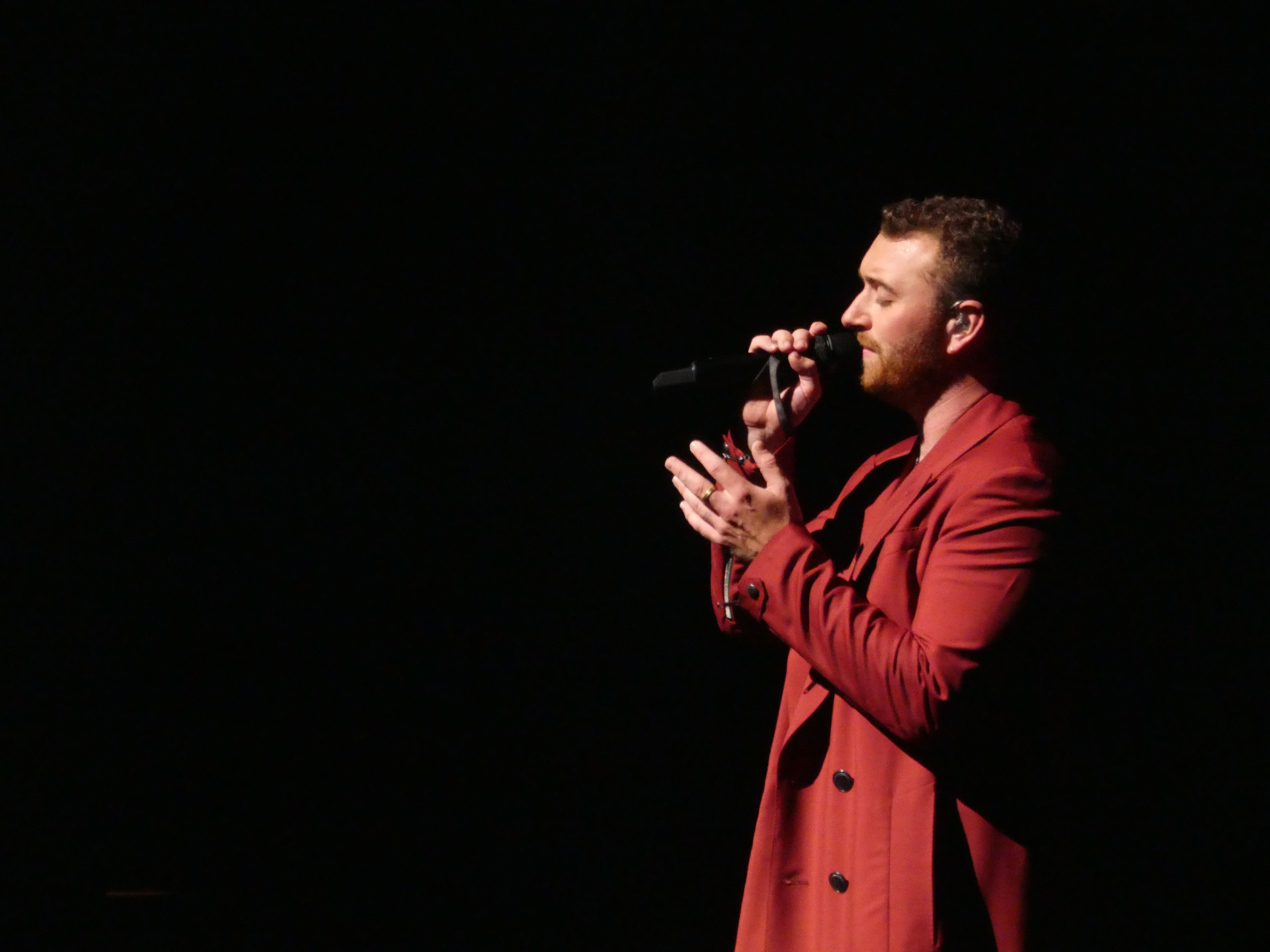
Smith performing at the Xcel Energy Center in Saint Paul, Minnesota, 2018

On 8 September 2017, Smith released a new single titled "Too Good at Goodbyes", which debuted at number one in the United Kingdom and No. 5 on the US Billboard Hot 100. Their second studio album, The Thrill of It All, debuted atop the UK Albums Chart and the US Billboard 200, becoming their first number one album in the US. On 20 March 2018, Smith started the Thrill of It All Tour, which visited Europe, North America, Asia, New Zealand, Australia, and South Africa until 2019. On 27 March 2018, they released "Pray" featuring American rapper Logic. On 17 August 2018, the singer collaborated as the main vocalist on Calvin Harris's new track "Promises". The song became Smith's seventh number one hit on the UK singles chart and their first top song on Billboard's Dance/Mix Show Airplay chart. They also released the song "Fire on Fire" as part of the Watership Down soundtrack.

In January 2019, Smith released the song "Dancing with a Stranger" with the American singer Normani as a single and it reached the top ten in the UK, the US and other countries. In February, Smith performed a medley of songs alongside Calvin Harris, Rag'n'Bone Man and Dua Lipa at the Brit Awards 2019 held at the O_{2} Arena in London. "How Do You Sleep?" was released on 19 July 2019. In December 2019, the Official Charts named In the Lonely Hour the best-selling debut album of the 2010s and the sixth best-selling album of the decade in the UK, while at 10 weeks, Smith's albums collectively spent the fourth-most weeks at number one in the UK in the 2010s, behind Ed Sheeran, Adele and Eminem.

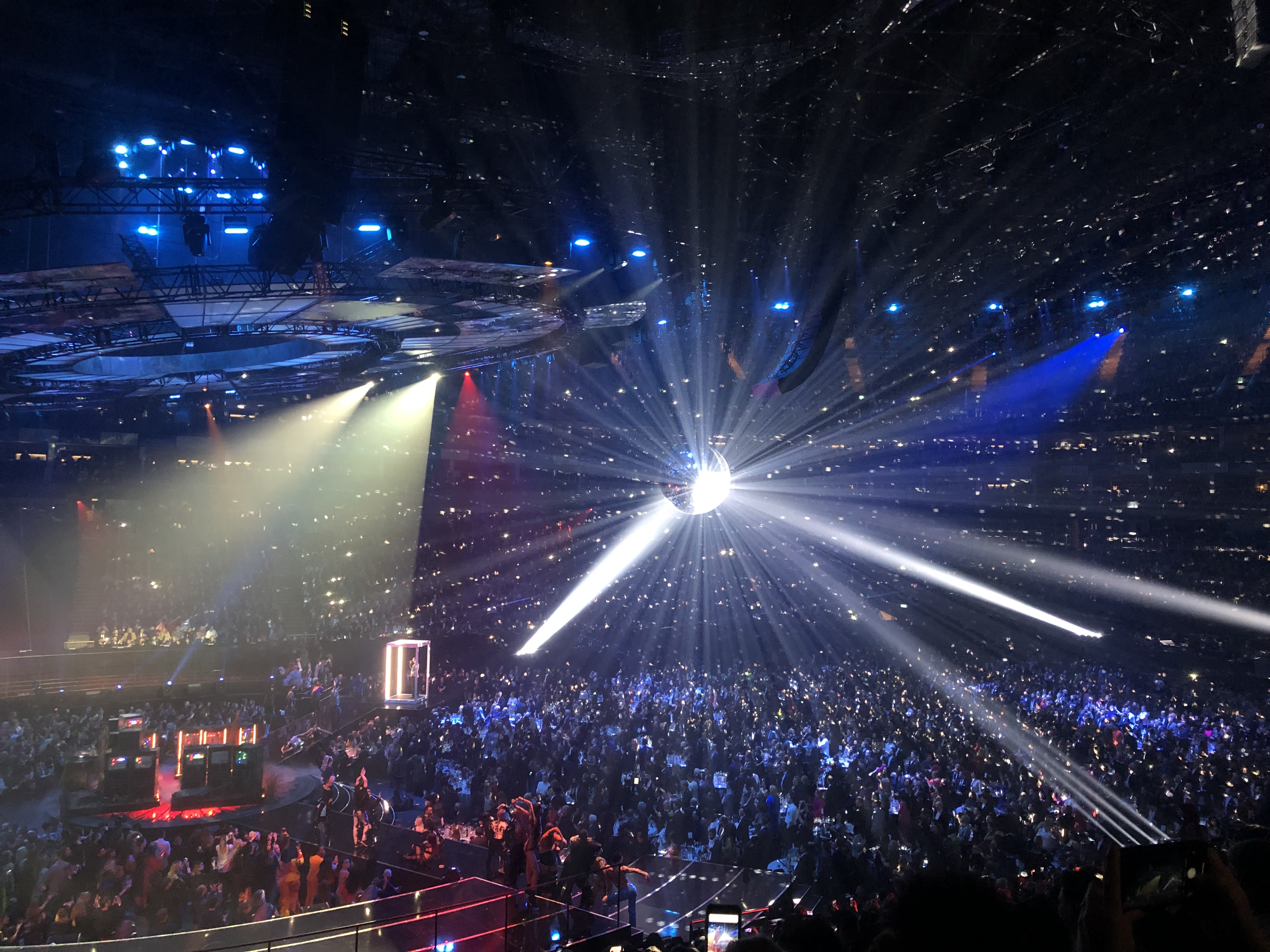
Smith performing with Calvin Harris, Rag'n'Bone Man and Dua Lipa at the Brit Awards 2019 in London

On 13 February 2020, Smith revealed that a third studio album, then titled To Die For, was scheduled to be released on 1 May. On 30 March, Smith announced that, due to the ongoing effects of the COVID-19 pandemic, they would be delaying the release of their third studio album and would include a number of changes to the album track list and the title, as they would continue to work on it. However, they did state that it would still be released sometime within 2020.

"I'm Ready", a collaboration with the American singer Demi Lovato was released on 16 April and charted well in the top 40 of several countries. On 6 July, Smith released their cover version of Coldplay's "Fix You". They had originally performed the song earlier in May for the iHeartRadio Living Room Series. On 17 September, they released a new single, "Diamonds", and then announced the new title for their third studio album, Love Goes, which was released on 30 October. On 29 September they announced that they would be performing a livestream concert on 30 October from Abbey Road Studios in London, their only live performance of 2020. The concert featured guest appearances by British actress Jade Anouka on "My Oasis" and singer Labrinth on "Love Goes", and included a cover version of "Time After Time", which drew praise from the song's original singer and writer Cyndi Lauper. The concert was recorded and released as a live album, Love Goes: Live at Abbey Road Studios, on 19 March 2021. The same year, Smith recorded a cover version of "You Will Be Found", in collaboration with the American singer and songwriter Summer Walker, for the soundtrack album of the 2021 film adaptation of the stage musical Dear Evan Hansen. Their version of the song also plays during the closing credits of the film itself.

=== 2022–present: Gloria and Hazel Eyes ===
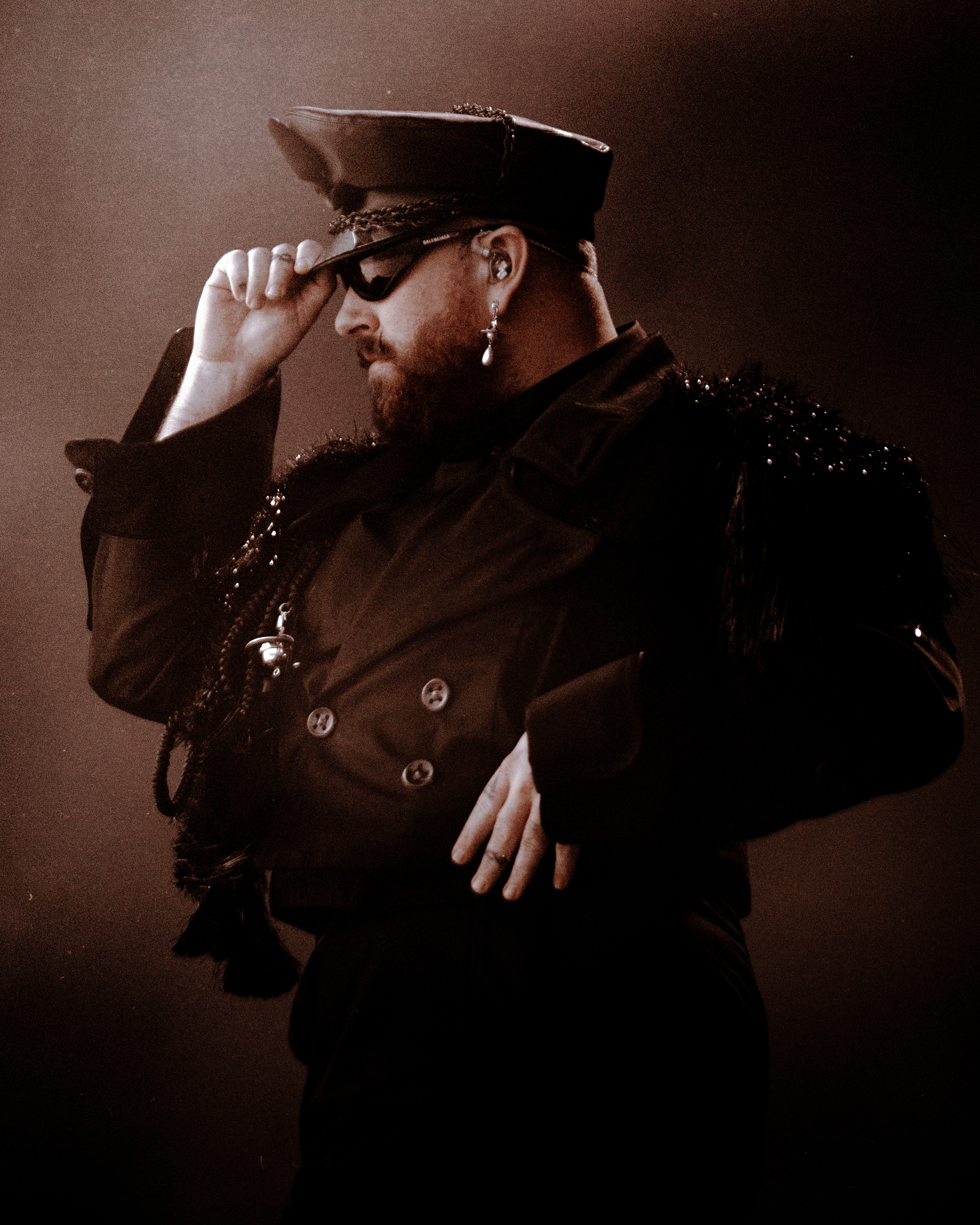
Smith performing at Pinkpop Festival in Landgraaf, Netherlands, 2024

On 25 August 2022, Smith announced that they had collaborated with the German singer Kim Petras on a song titled "Unholy", with Petras calling it "the best song" she has been part of. The first single from Smith's fourth studio album Gloria, it reached number one in the UK, the US (Smith's first US chart topper), Australia and other markets. The song made Smith and Petras the first openly non-binary and first openly transgender musicians, respectively, to release a song that reached No. 1 on the US Billboard Hot 100. On 18 November, Smith released the single "Night Before Christmas", which was added to their EP The Holly & the Ivy. Gloria was released on 27 January 2023, garnering generally favourable reviews from critics.

In February 2023, Smith and Petras won the Grammy Award for Best Pop Duo/Group Performance for "Unholy". This made Smith the first openly non-binary artist to win a Grammy, and Petras the first openly transgender artist to win a major-category Grammy. In April of that year, Smith embarked on the Gloria the Tour to promote the album. The concert tour visited Europe, North America, Asia, and Oceania throughout the year. In July 2023, Smith and the Scottish DJ Calvin Harris collaborated for a second time, and released a song titled "Desire" on 28 July 2023 with Sony Music. The song peaked at number 5 on the US Billboard Hot Dance/Electronic Songs.

In August 2024, Smith performed at the BBC Proms at the Royal Albert Hall in London.

On 21 August 2026, Smith released their fifth studio album, Hazel Eyes.

== Artistry ==
=== Musical style and influences ===
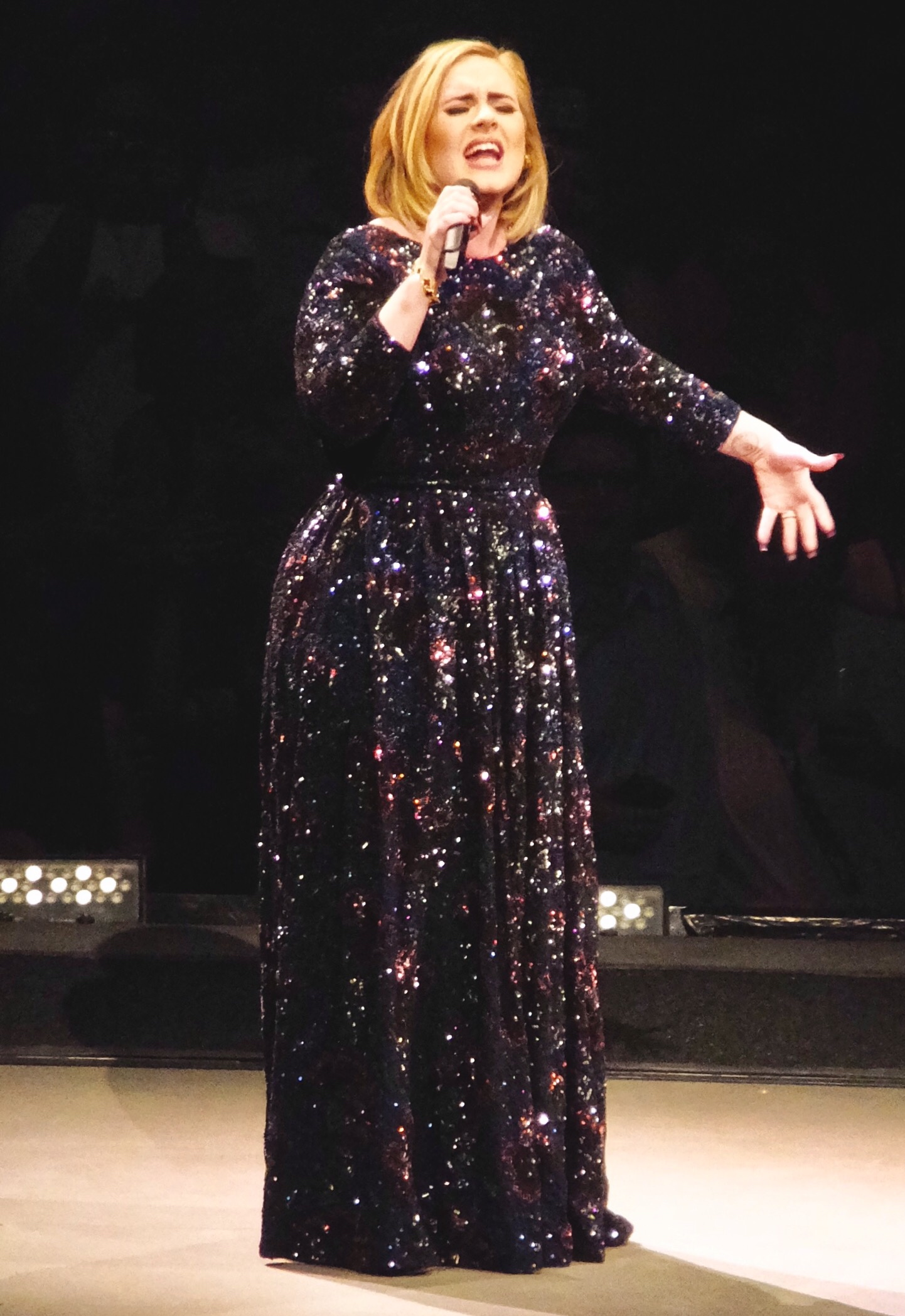
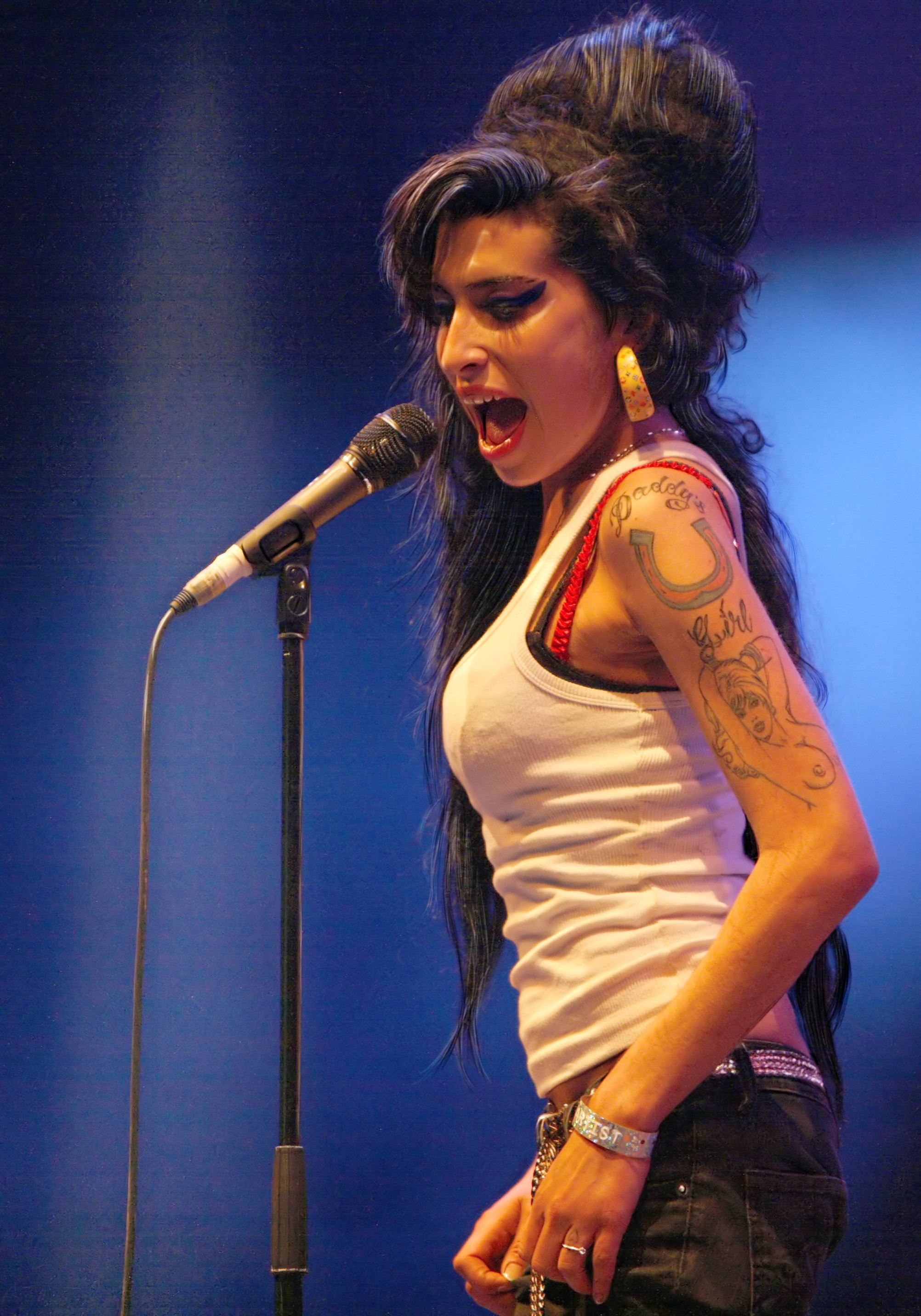
Smith has cited Adele (left) and Amy Winehouse (right) as primary influences.

Musically, Smith's music encompasses pop, soul, dance, and R&B.

Smith has cited Adele and Amy Winehouse as primary influences. They admire Adele's "honesty in her music" and the way she has handled fame; they expressed a wish to maintain a similar public image. Winehouse's debut studio album Frank (2003) was the first album Smith ever bought. Early in their career, Smith received advice from Mary J. Blige and Chaka Khan, both of whom they listened to during their youth; Smith said that this inspired them to offer help to new artists themself. They called Taylor Swift a "role model" and praised her "soulfulness" as well as her "honesty".

Smith stated that the story of Lady Gaga's career beginnings encouraged them to move to London to start their own career. They also credited her with helping them come out as non-binary. Smith described the Swedish singer Robyn as a major influence on Love Goes and said that they listened to her "nonstop" while making the album because they "could dance and be sad at the same time and feel empowered". They further cited Beyoncé and Christina Aguilera as sources of inspiration and empowerment. Speaking to Rolling Stone in January 2016, Smith named Whitney Houston and Mariah Carey as the greatest R&B voices. Smith's other influences include Britney Spears and Brandy.

In an October 2017 interview for Attitude magazine, Smith spoke of the impact of their close friend Ed Sheeran's success: "It makes you push yourself. Watching him this past year has just been incredible, but yeah, of course it makes me hungry." They had previously mentioned to GQ in January 2015 that they "envy the competition that people like [Frank] Sinatra would have ... because you could tell he was working off them".

=== Vocal style ===
A VH1 profile of Smith's vocal coach Joanna Eden noted that Smith's vocal range "can soar from baritone to tenor for dramatic effect". Smith places a lot of emphasis on their voice and stated they tried to make it the main element of their debut studio album In the Lonely Hour. Following the release of the album, their vocals were often compared to those of Adele. Jessica Robertson of The Fader considers that Smith represents "a return of the virtuosic vocalist in popular music", in the vein of Whitney Houston and Luther Vandross. Jim Farber wrote for the New York Daily News that Smith is "utterly unafraid to sound feminine"; Mary J. Blige thought that Smith was a black woman when she first heard them sing on Disclosure's "Latch". Asked about the "diva quality" of their voice, Smith remarked in January 2014:

It's all I listened to. I actually didn't listen to male vocalists until about two years ago. I just listened to Whitney Houston, Chaka Khan. Massive voices.

== Personal life ==
In May 2014, Smith came out to the public as gay and acknowledged they had been in a brief relationship with the actor and model Jonathan Zeizel. In 2015, at the 57th Annual Grammy Awards when "Stay with Me" won an award for Record of the Year, they said, "I want to thank the man this record is about, whom I fell in love with last year. Thank you so much for breaking my heart because you got me four Grammys!". In October 2017, Smith stated that their second studio album The Thrill of It All showed "the gay guy I've become". In September 2017, Smith revealed a relationship with actor Brandon Flynn in an interview on The Ellen DeGeneres Show. In June 2018, it was announced that Smith and Flynn had split after nine months of dating.

In October 2017, Smith came out as non-binary, saying, "I feel just as much a woman as I am a man" and speaking of a period in their youth where they "didn't own a piece of male clothing and would wear full makeup while attending school". In September 2019, they changed their pronouns to they/them, stating, "After a lifetime of being at war with my gender I've decided to embrace myself for who I am, inside and out ...".

Smith has struggled with body image issues since their preteen years and has been open about this in interviews. Smith is a feminist.

Smith is the godparent of close friend and collaborator Jimmy Napes' son.

Smith confirmed their long-term relationship with fashion designer Christian Cowan to The New York Times in May 2024. The two are engaged.

== Discography ==
Studio albums

- In the Lonely Hour (2014)
- The Thrill of It All (2017)
- Love Goes (2020)
- Gloria (2023)
- Hazel Eyes (2026)

== Tours and residencies ==
Headlining

- In the Lonely Hour Tour (2015)
- The Thrill of It All Tour (2018–2019)
- Gloria the Tour (2023)
- Gloria the Blackout (2024)
- To Be Free (2025–2026)

== Filmography ==
Year	Title	Role	Notes	Ref.
2017	On the Record: Sam Smith	Themself	Documentary	
2018	I'm Still Standing: A Grammy Salute to Sir Elton John	Themself	CBS special	
2023	And Just Like That...	Themself	Episode: "The Last Supper Part One: Appetizer"	
2024	The Second Best Hospital in the Galaxy	Dr. Azazel	Main role	

== See also ==
- List of highest-certified music artists in the United States
- List of artists who reached number one on the UK singles chart
- List of best-selling singles in the United States

== Notes ==
Preceded by Adele "Skyfall", 2012	James Bond title artist "Writing's on the Wall", 2015	Succeeded by Billie Eilish "No Time to Die", 2020
Preceded by the National	Saturday Night Live (SNL) musical guest 29 March 2014	Succeeded by Pharrell Williams
Awards and achievements
Preceded by Tom Odell	Brit Award for Rising Star; 2014	Succeeded by James Bay
Preceded by Common and John Legend	Academy Award for Best Original Song; 2015	Succeeded by Justin Hurwitz and Pasek and Paul
Preceded by Common and John Legend	Golden Globe Award for Best Original Song; 2015	Succeeded by Justin Hurwitz and Pasek and Paul
Preceded by Bastille	Brit Award for Best New Artist; 2015	Succeeded by Catfish and the Bottlemen
Preceded by Macklemore & Ryan Lewis	Grammy Award for Best New Artist; 2015	Succeeded by Meghan Trainor
Preceded by Lil Nas X	GLAAD Media Award for Outstanding Music Artist; 2021	Succeeded by Lil Nas X
