= Hunger of the Pine =

Single by Alt-J

from the album This Is All Yours
- Released: 19 June 2014
- Recorded: 2014
- Genre: Indie rock, art rock
- Length: 5:00 (album version); 3:38 (music video version)
- Label: Infectious
- Songwriters: Joe Newman, Thom Green, Gus Unger-Hamilton
- Producer: Charlie Andrew

Alt-J singles chronology
"Dissolve Me" (2013)	"Hunger of the Pine" (2014)	"Left Hand Free" (2014)

"Hunger of the Pine" is a song by English indie rock band Alt-J. It was released as the lead single from the band's second studio album This Is All Yours on 19 June 2014.

== Background and composition ==
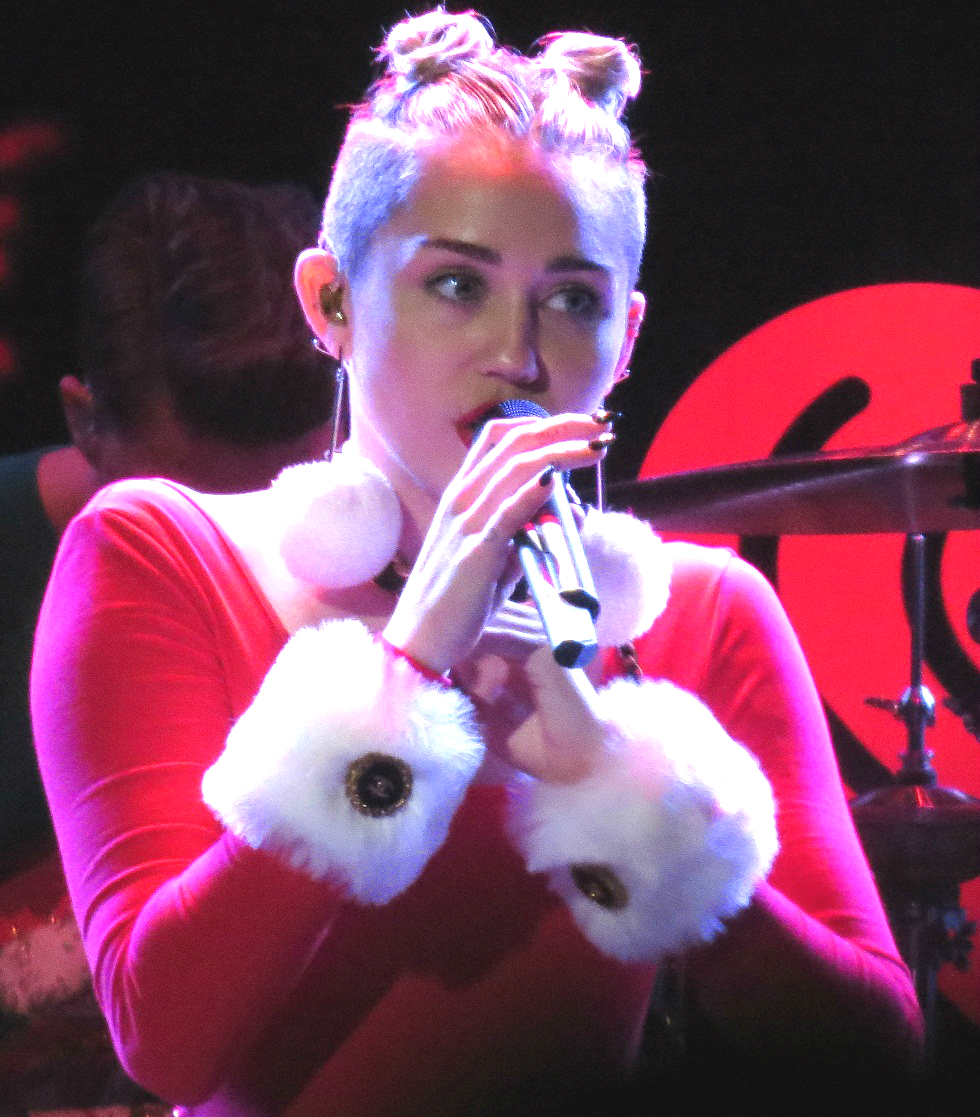
The song features a sample from the 2013 track "4x4", by Miley Cyrus (pictured)

"Hunger of the Pine" was one of several songs written by Alt-J following bassist Gwil Sainsbury's departure from the band in January 2014. It samples the words "I'm a female rebel" from American recording artist Miley Cyrus's 2013 song "4x4". Thom Green, the band's drummer, had produced a remix of "4x4" for Cyrus, and incorporated the vocal sample into the song; according to lead singer Joe Newman, Cyrus was "cool" with the band using the sample and "has been really supportive of us, and she's a fan, I think, which is really nice." Keyboardist Gus Unger-Hamilton stated that the sample "sounded cool with what Joe was playing on the guitar."

Unger-Hamilton further explained to NPR the meaning of the song: "The lyrics mainly suggest the idea that missing someone – pining – can be a physical pain much like hunger.

== Release ==
On June 13, 2014, Alt-J posted a video on their Instagram account featuring a clip of "Hunger of the Pine". On June 18, the single premiered on Zane Lowe's BBC Radio 1 show and was made available for streaming. It was released to the iTunes Store the following day.

== Music video ==
The music video for "Hunger of the Pine" was released on YouTube on 16 July 2014, three days prior to the single's release. The video, directed by Nabil Elderkin, graphically depicts a man (played by professional freerunner Ashley "Spider" Holland) getting shot by arrows as he runs through a forest. At the end of the video, the man drenches himself with what appears to be gasoline from a jerrycan while approaching flaming arrows fill the sky.

== Charts ==
Chart (2014)	Peak position
Australia (ARIA)	71
Belgium (Ultratip Bubbling Under Flanders)	8
France (SNEP)	147
UK Singles (OCC)	59
UK Indie (OCC)	4
US Hot Rock & Alternative Songs (Billboard)	20
US Alternative Airplay (Billboard)	33

== Certifications ==
Region	Certification	Certified units/sales
Australia (ARIA)	Gold	35,000^{‡}
United Kingdom (BPI)	Silver	200,000^{‡}
^{‡} Sales+streaming figures based on certification alone.

== Release history ==
Region	Date	Format	Label
Italy	19 June 2014	Contemporary hit radio	Spin-Go!
United Kingdom	19 June 2014	Digital download	Infectious
United States	19 June 2014	Digital download	Canvasback Music, Atlantic
