= Kaja Gunnufsen =

Norwegian singer and songwriter

Kaja Gunnufsen (born 10 May 1988) is a Norwegian singer and songwriter. She has released music on the labels Brilliance, Diamond Club, and SSaudio. Critics have labeled her a "spokesperson for a new generation," and have lauded her lyrics about Internet culture and other Millennial subjects.

== Albums ==
After releasing singles during the early 2010s under Brilliance Records, Gunnufsen debuted her studio album on Brilliance, Faen Kaja, on March 7, 2014. The album went on to be named the fourth best album of the year by Dagbladet.

== Personal life ==
Gunnufsen is from Ås, Norway, and was born in 1988.

== Controversy ==
Gunnufsen's debut album title, which can be translated to variations of "Fuck Kaja" or "Damn Kaja", brought controversy from Facebook in 2014 when the social network prohibited the album's promotion on the site due to the site's policy against vulgar language.
