= Scrufizzer =

British musician

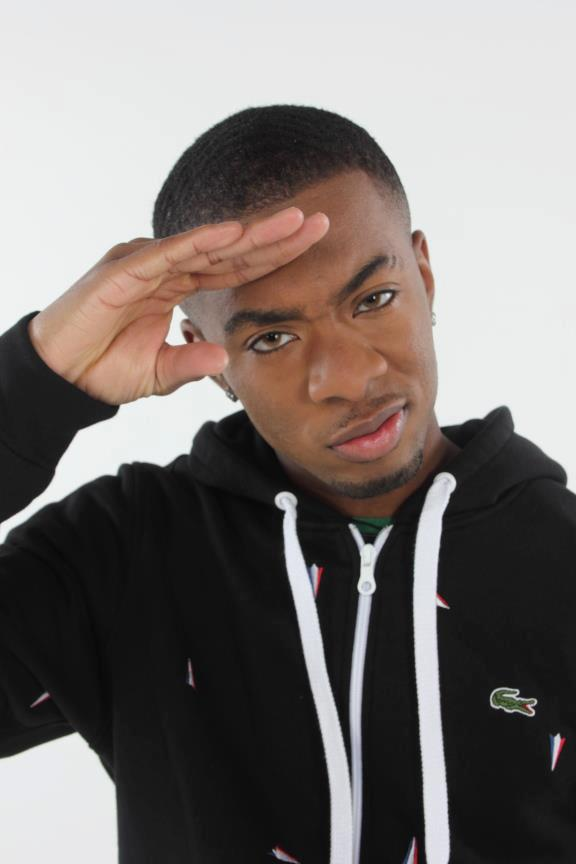
- Scrufizzer in 2013

Background information
- Also known as: Fizzyflow
- Born: Amary Lorenzo
- Origin: West Ealing, West London
- Genres: British hip hop; grime; dance-pop
- Occupations: Rapper; MC; singer-songwriter; record producer; composer
- Instruments: drum machine; keyboards; sampler; synthesizer; vocals
- Years active: 2008–present
- Labels: Black Butter Records; Stay Fizzy Records; Ministry of Sound

Amary Lorenzo, better known as Scrufizzer, is a British rapper, MC, singer-songwriter, and record producer from West London. He first gained recognition as a grime producer before building a reputation for his bashment-influenced flow and versatility.

== Career ==
Scrufizzer, a member of the production group Funkystepz, released his first mixtape entitled My First Steps in 2007. With support ranging from Zane Lowe and Annie Mac to Dizzee Rascal, Ed Sheeran and Wiley, Scrufizzer has gone on to perform with top names, including Wiley and DJ Cameo as well as opening for Kendrick Lamar in shows across the UK. BBC Radio 1Xtra DJ, DJ Cameo, joined the Kendrick Lamar tour as Scrufizzer's DJ, and has called Scrufizzer his protégé. In a January 2013 interview, Rock Feedback claimed Scrufizzer to have "the quickest flow in the game right now, and with it, Scrufizzer has become one of the most exciting prospects in the grime scene."

Scrufizzer has appeared on tracks of high-profile artists, including "Guts N' Glory" by Dizzee Rascal, "Werkin Girls" by Angel Haze, "Kingpin" by DJ Friction & Skream, M. J. Cole's "Southern Electric", and Loadstar's "Do You Feel Me". Scrufizzer also featured on Toddla T & Cleo Sol's "Code to Crack" which received its first radio play by MistaJam. He appeared on Lunar C's track "Back on the Step" alongside Mic Righteous and on Danny Brown's 2013 album Old. Other collaborations include DJ Cameo alongside Maxsta, Kozzie and Dot Rotten.

With his trademark "fizzy flow", Scrufizzer combines rap with modern grime, which led The Guardian to name him one of the "ones to watch in 2013".

Scrufizzer's debut single "Rap Rave" was released on 28 January 2013 on Stay Fizzy Records/Ministry of Sound. The Independent said that Scrufizzer "might, perhaps be considered one of the highest rated young MCs to be part of this new wave." "Rap Rave", produced by Paperbwoy, shows off Scrufizzer's distinct 'fizzy flow' and spitting techniques. In early 2013, BBC 1xtra's Nick Bright reckoned that Scrufizzer was the fastest spitter in the UK.

On 21 May 2013, Scrufizzer signed with UK label Black Butter Records via Polydor Records, and released the single "Kick It" in October 2013. The song charted at number 43 on the UK Singles Chart. The video for "Kick It" was produced by Zed Bias, directed by Mister Whitmore and released in August 2013. It was filmed in LA and features attractive girls all in the same dress, an homage to the Robert Palmer video for "Addicted to Love".

Scrufizzer appeared on the bill of many festivals during the summer of 2013, including FSTVL, Friday at London's Lovebox Festival, Global Gathering and the BBC Radio 1Xtra Stage Reading and Leeds Festival. He also performed at a Rudimental headline show at "Black Butter Records presents at Ibiza Rocks", and jumped on DJ Friction's set with a special performance of "Kingpin" and a freestyle at Creamfields and SW4 Festivals.

== Politics ==
In November 2019, Scrufizzer helped relaunch the Grime4Corbyn campaign to encourage young people to register to vote.

== Discography ==
=== Mixtapes ===
Title	Details
Fizzy Flow	Released: 2012; Format: Digital download
Fizzy Flow 2	Released: 2016; Format: Digital download

=== Singles ===
Title	Details
Steam	Released: 2012; Format: Digital download
Rap Rave	Released: 2013; Format: Digital download
Kick It	Released: 2013; Format: Digital download
Shizam (with Zed Bias and Stylo G)	Released: 2014; Format: Digital download
Vibe On This	Released: 2016; Format: Digital download
Remember Me	Released: 2016; Format: Digital download
Bump & Grind" ft Vato Gonazles	Released: 2018; Format: Digital download
Don't Need You" ft Eyez produced by Stimpy	Released: 2020; Format: Digital download
Skank & Flex" ft Wax Motif Talki Knight	Released: 2022; Format: Digital download
Man do Road " ft JME	Released: 2023; Format: Digital download
one three nine ft Zeds Dead	Released: 2023; Format: Digital download
Night rider" ft Ac Slater	Released: 2023; Format: Digital download

=== Featured songs ===
Title	Details	Album		
Title	Details	Album	—	
Guts N Glory – Dizzee Rascal feat. Scrufizzer	Released: 2011; Format: Digital download			
Southern Electric – M. J. Cole feat. Scrufizzer	Released: 2011; Format: Digital download	—		
You Need Me, I Don't Need You (True Tiger Remix) – Ed Sheeran feat. Scrufizzer & Dot Rotten	Released: 2011; Format: Digital download	—		
Leave It Yeah (Remix) – Lethal Bizzle feat. Scrufizzer, Emmanuel Frimpong, JME, Face, Frisco & Flowdan	Released: 2012; Format: Digital download	—		
Werkin Girl – Angel Haze feat. Scrufizzer	Released: 2012; Format: Digital download	—		
Put Your Bets On" – True Tiger feat. Scrufizzer	Released: 2012; Format: Digital download	—		—
Kingpin – Friction & Skream feat. Scrufizzer, P Money & Riko Dan	Released: 2013; Format: Digital download	—		
Do You Feel Me – Loadstar feat. Scrufizzer	Released: 2013; Format: Digital download	—		
Code to Crack – Toddla T & Cleo Sol feat. Scrufizzer	Released: 2013; Format: Digital download	—		
"Dubstep" – Danny Brown feat. Scrufizzer	Released: 2013; Format: Digital download			
Big Round & Juicy – Jaded feat. Scrufizzer	Released: 2015; Format: Digital download			
The Vibe – Motez feat. Scrufizzer	Released: 2016; Format: Digital download			
About This Thing - Young Franco feat. Scrufizzer	Released: 2017; Format: Digital download	—		
All About Paper – AC Slater & Basssboy feat. Scrufizzer	Released: 2017; Format: Digital download	—		
Bump & Grind (Bassline Riddim) – Vato Gonzalez feat. Scrufizzer	Released: 2018; Format: Digital download	Released: 2017; Format: Digital download	—	
Work It – Shockaddict feat. Scrufizzer	Released: 2020; Format: Digital download	— —		
Move Over – Curbi feat. Scrufizzer	Released: 2025; Format: Digital download	— —		
