= Kick It (Scrufizzer song) =

Single by Scrufizzer
- Released: 4 October 2013
- Recorded: 2013
- Genre: British hip hop; hip house; deep house
- Length: 3:30; 4:21 (extended mix)
- Label: Black Butter Records; Polydor
- Songwriter(s): Romani Lorenzo; Dave Jones
- Producer(s): Zed Bias

Scrufizzer singles chronology
| "Kingpin" (2013) | "Kick It" (2013) | "Shizam" (2014) |

"Kick It" is a song by English rapper Scrufizzer. It was released on 4 October 2013. The track was produced by Zed Bias. The song reached number 62 in the UK Singles Chart.

== Music video ==
The official video for "Kick It" premiered on 18 August 2013, at a total length of 3 minutes and 41 seconds. An acoustic A64 of the song was filmed for SB.TV in which Scrufizzer also freestyled.

== Track listing ==
Digital download
| No. | Title | Length |
|---|---|---|
| 1. | "Kick It" (Official edit) | 3:30 |
| 2. | "Kick It" (Extended mix) | 4:21 |
| 3. | "Kick It" (Zed Bias Madd Again! Mix) | 4:32 |
| 4. | "Kick It" (Marshall F Remix) | 4:53 |
| 5. | "Kick It" (Patrick Hagenaar Remix) | 4:39 |

== Chart performance ==
| Chart (2013) | Peak position |
|---|---|
| UK Dance (OCC) | 11 |
| UK Indie (OCC) | 9 |
| UK Indie Breakers (Official Charts Company) | 1 |
| UK Singles (OCC) | 62 |

== Release history ==
| Country | Release date | Format |
|---|---|---|
| Worldwide | 4 October 2013 | Digital download |
