= The Lighthouse Keeper =

2020 song by Sam Smith

Single by Sam Smith

from the EP The Holly & the Ivy
- Released: 20 November 2020
- Genre: Traditional pop
- Length: 4:07
- Label: Capitol
- Songwriters: Labrinth; Sam Smith
- Producer: Labrinth

Sam Smith singles chronology
"Kids Again" (2020)	"The Lighthouse Keeper" (2020)	"You Will Be Found" (2021)

"The Lighthouse Keeper" is a song by the English singer Sam Smith, released through Capitol Records on 20 November 2020 as a single from their extended play, The Holly & the Ivy (2020). The song was written by Labrinth and Sam Smith. It peaked at number 72 on the UK Singles Chart.

== Background ==
"The Lighthouse Keeper" is the second time that Smith has worked with Labrinth, he features on the title track that features on Smith's third studio album Love Goes. Labrinth also produced the song.

"If any year could make me look forward to the sounds of Christmas, it would be 2020 as more than ever before we are yearning to be around our friends and family once again. Christmas symbolises that for me and earlier this year I was inspired to write a Christmas love song. Labrinth and I poured our hearts into this one and it has honestly been pure joy to create and make."

— "Listen to Sam Smith's new Christmas song 'The Lighthouse Keeper'", NME

== Composition ==
Written in partnership with Labrinth it is unlike anything Sam Smith has produced before. It is a throwback to the 1940s, a song with a story of Christmas reunion. The result is an unusual mix of sombre anthem and gentle lullaby, with classical-style choral backing and soft strings. The Christmas theme is subtle; the reference "home for Christmas time" doesn't come until the end of verse two.

== Music video ==
A music video to accompany the release of "The Lighthouse Keeper" was first released onto YouTube on 23 November 2020. The animation video was created by Babekühl. It was animated by Alexis Pepper Hernandez, Andrew Yee, Billy Ryan, Chris Yee, Eva Li, Opal Liang, Patrick Santamaria and Steffie Yee while Sam was its director.

== Credits and personnel ==
Credits adapted from Tidal.

- Labrinth – producer, composer, lyricist, background vocalist, electro-acoustic realisation, recording engineer
- Sam Smith – composer, lyricist, vocals
- Mark Deml – assistant mixer
- Alison Dods – violin
- Andy Parker – viola
- Bruce White – viola
- Caroline Dale – cello
- Chris Laurence – bass
- Chris Worsey – cello
- David Pyatt – French horn
- Everton Nelson – violin
- Ian Burdge – cello
- Ian Humphries – violin
- Joby Burgess – timpani
- John Metcalfe – viola
- Louisa Fuller – violin
- Lucy Wilkins – violin
- Natalia Bonner – violin
- Patrick Kiernan – violin
- Reiad Chibah – viola
- Richard George – violin
- Stacey Watton – bass
- Steve Morris – violin
- Tony Woollard – cello
- Warren Zielinski – violin
- Randy Merrill – mastering engineer
- Steve Fitzmaurice – mixer

== Charts ==
Chart performance for "The Lighthouse Keeper"
Chart (2020)	Peak position
Ireland (IRMA)	97
New Zealand Hot Singles (RMNZ)	27
Sweden Heatseeker (Sverigetopplistan)	8
UK Singles (Official Charts)	72
