= Luchina Fisher =

American journalist, film director, writer and producer

Luchina Fisher (born December 19, 1966) is an American journalist, Emmy Award-winning film director, writer and producer. Her works are related to race, gender and identity (LGBTQ+). She also teaches documentary filmmaking at Yale University

Luchina graduated from the University of North Carolina at Chapel Hill with a BA in journalism. She also attended the University of Bristol for Film and Television. She began her career as a journalist writing for the Miami Herald and People magazine. She also wrote for the ABCNews.com about film, celebrities and the entertainment industry.

== Personal ==
Luchina is a woman of color and as of 2022, is mother of three.

== Works ==
- 2023: Locked Out, feature film about the barriers to Black home ownership, co-directed with Kate Davis
- 2020: Mama Gloria, feature directorial debut about Chicago trans icon activist Gloria Allen
- 2022: Team Dream, short documentary about two women of color: Ann Smith, who is in her 80s, and Madeline Murphy Rabb, who is in her 70s. After their retirements, they decided to take up competitive swimming.
- 2023: The Dads, short documentary about five dads of trans and LGBTQ kids on a weekend fishing trip together with the father of Matthew Shepard, the young man who was killed at the University of Wyoming The film won the 2024 Daytime Emmy for Outstanding Short Form Program.
- 2017: Birthright: A War Story, feature documentary that "examines how women are being jailed, physically violated and even put at risk of dying as a radical movement takes control of whether, when and how women will bear children"
- 2013: Danger World, "scripted short about a 13-year-old girl and her grandfather, hiding out in a wooded cabin after a plague, meeting the challenge of their lives when her birthday trip to a trading post goes horribly awry"

In 2023 she won the top prize of $150,000 from PitchBLACK Forum for her pitch for her new documentary Hiding in Plain Sight. The work is intended to highlights Black-queer representation in music. Some of the persons covered in the documentary are Sister Rosetta Tharpe, Little Richard, Sylvester and Jackie Shane.

== Awards ==
- 2024: Daytime Emmy Award for Outstanding Short Form Program for The Dads
- 2023: "Shine the Light" Award at Freep Festival and Best Documentary Feature at American Black Film Festival for Locked Out
- Best Documentary Short prize at the Pan African Film Festival for Team Dream, also Winner of the Audience Choice Award at the 2022 Chicago International Film Festival and Best of Fest Jury Mention. Best Documentary Short, TIDE Film Festival. Golden Thumb Award, 2023 EbertFest
- Best of Fest, CineOdyssey Film Festival; Best Documentary Jury Award, Teaneck International; Black Lens Award, Milwaukee Film Festival for Mama Gloria
