= Fire on Fire =

Single by Sam Smith
- Released: 21 December 2018
- Studio: Abbey Road (London, England)
- Genre: Soul; pop
- Length: 4:06
- Label: Capitol
- Songwriters: Sam Smith; Steve Mac
- Producer: Steve Mac

Sam Smith singles chronology
| "Promises" (2018) | "Fire on Fire" (2018) | "Dancing with a Stranger" (2019) |

Music video
- "Fire on Fire" on YouTube

"Fire on Fire" is a song by the English singer and songwriter Sam Smith, produced by Steve Mac. It was co-written by Smith and Mac for the 2018 Netflix adaptation of the 1972 novel Watership Down. "Fire on Fire" was released as a single on 21 December 2018 through Capitol Records. It charted in the top 40 in Hungary, Sweden, Norway, Finland, Switzerland, and Ireland. The song appears on Smith's third studio album, Love Goes (2020).

== Background ==
The track was written by Sam Smith and producer/songwriter Steve Mac, and recorded with the BBC Concert Orchestra at London's Abbey Road Studios in September 2018. Smith said in a statement: "I am so excited and honored to be a part of this new adaptation of Watership Down. This story is so powerful and timeless, and it has been thrilling to work with the director Noam Murro and his team and the incredible Steve Mac on this song for it. I hope everyone loves it as much as I do."

== Critical reception ==
Gil Kaufman from Billboard called "Fire on Fire" a haunting and stirring ballad. He wrote that Smith's emotional theme song taps into the story's roller-coaster of fear, hope and friendship.

== Music video ==
The music video for "Fire on Fire" was released on 21 December 2018.

== Charts ==
=== Weekly charts ===
| Chart (2018–19) | Peak position |
|---|---|
| Australia (ARIA) | 93 |
| Belgium (Ultratip Bubbling Under Flanders) | 10 |
| Belgium (Ultratip Bubbling Under Wallonia) | 11 |
| Finland (Suomen virallinen lista) | 18 |
| France Downloads (SNEP) | 122 |
| Hungary (Single Top 40) | 11 |
| Ireland (IRMA) | 38 |
| Netherlands (Single Top 100) | 56 |
| Netherlands (Tipparade) | 2 |
| New Zealand Hot Singles (RMNZ) | 13 |
| Norway (VG-lista) | 17 |
| Portugal (AFP) | 94 |
| Scottish Singles Sales (Official Charts) | 52 |
| Singapore (RIAS) | 28 |
| Sweden (Sverigetopplistan) | 16 |
| Switzerland (Schweizer Hitparade) | 35 |
| UK Singles (Official Charts) | 63 |

=== Year-end charts ===
| Chart (2019) | Position |
|---|---|
| Sweden (Sverigetopplistan) | 88 |

== Certifications ==
| Region | Certification | Certified units/sales |
|---|---|---|
| Australia (ARIA) | 2× Platinum | 140,000^{‡} |
| Austria (IFPI Austria) | Platinum | 30,000^{‡} |
| Brazil (Pro-Música Brasil) | Diamond | 160,000^{‡} |
| Canada (Music Canada) | 2× Platinum | 160,000^{‡} |
| Denmark (IFPI Danmark) | Platinum | 90,000^{‡} |
| France (SNEP) | Platinum | 200,000^{‡} |
| Germany (BVMI) | Gold | 200,000^{‡} |
| Italy (FIMI) | Gold | 35,000^{‡} |
| New Zealand (RMNZ) | Platinum | 30,000^{‡} |
| Norway (IFPI Norway) | 2× Platinum | 120,000^{‡} |
| Spain (Promusicae) | Gold | 30,000^{‡} |
| Poland (ZPAV) | Platinum | 50,000^{‡} |
| Portugal (AFP) | Platinum | 10,000^{‡} |
| United Kingdom (BPI) | Platinum | 600,000^{‡} |
| United States (RIAA) | Platinum | 1,000,000^{‡} |
^{‡} Sales+streaming figures based on certification alone.

== Release history ==
| Region | Date | Format | Label | Ref. |
|---|---|---|---|---|
| Various | 21 December 2018 | Digital download | Capitol | |
