= How Do You Sleep? (Sam Smith song) =

2019 single by Sam Smith

Single by Sam Smith

from the album Love Goes
- Released: 19 July 2019
- Studio: MXM Studios; Los Angeles, California
- Genre: Pop; dance-pop
- Length: 3:22
- Label: Capitol
- Songwriters: Sam Smith; Savan Kotecha; Max Martin; Ilya Salmanzadeh
- Producer: Ilya

Sam Smith singles chronology
"Dancing with a Stranger" (2019)	"How Do You Sleep?" (2019)	"I Feel Love" (2019)

Music video
- "How Do You Sleep?" on YouTube

"How Do You Sleep?" is a song by the English singer Sam Smith, released on 19 July 2019. Smith co-wrote the song with Savan Kotecha, Max Martin and Ilya, the latter of whom produced the song. The song appears on Smith's third studio album Love Goes (2020). Commercially, the song reached number one in Lebanon and the top ten in thirteen additional countries.

== Critical reception ==
Rolling Stone described the song as a "pop ballad about trying to move on".

== Music video ==
The music video was released alongside the song on 19 July. It was directed by Grant Singer, with choreography by Parris Goebel, and features Smith dancing with a troupe of shirtless male dancers wearing waist trainers.

== Promotion ==
Smith posted on their social media accounts on 9 July that they had an announcement to make the following day. The pre-order link became active on 10 July, and later the same day, Smith formally announced and shared a clip of the song. The song is featured on Now That's What I Call Music! 104 in the UK.

== Charts ==
=== Weekly charts ===
Chart (2019–2020)	Peak position
Argentina (Argentina Hot 100)	94
Australia (ARIA)	10
Austria (Ö3 Austria Top 40)	40
Belgium (Ultratop 50 Flanders)	11
Belgium (Ultratop 50 Wallonia)	6
Canada Hot 100 (Billboard)	16
Canada AC (Billboard)	27
Canada CHR/Top 40 (Billboard)	9
Canada Hot AC (Billboard)	16
Chile (Monitor Latino)	15
China Airplay/FL (Billboard)	6
Czech Republic Singles Digital (ČNS IFPI)	11
Denmark (Tracklisten)	14
Euro Digital Song Sales (Billboard)	7
France (SNEP)	119
Germany (GfK)	43
Hungary (Rádiós Top 40)	21
Hungary (Single Top 40)	15
Hungary (Stream Top 40)	12
Ireland (IRMA)	4
Italy (FIMI)	66
Latvia (LAIPA)	4
Lebanon (Lebanese Top 20)	1
Lithuania (AGATA)	3
Malaysia (RIM)	4
Mexico Airplay (Billboard)	2
Netherlands (Dutch Top 40)	7
Netherlands (Single Top 100)	17
New Zealand (Recorded Music NZ)	5
Norway (VG-lista)	9
Portugal (AFP)	23
Portugal Airplay (AFP)	5
Puerto Rico (Monitor Latino)	7
Romania (Airplay 100)	18
Romania Airplay (Media Forest)	9
San Marino (SMRRTV Top 50)	31
Scottish Singles Sales (Official Charts)	6
Singapore (RIAS)	2
Slovakia Singles Digital (ČNS IFPI)	8
Slovenia (SloTop50)	21
South Korea (Gaon)	180
Spain (Promusicae)	87
Sweden (Sverigetopplistan)	20
Switzerland (Schweizer Hitparade)	26
UK Singles (Official Charts)	7
US Billboard Hot 100	24
US Adult Contemporary (Billboard)	21
US Adult Pop Airplay (Billboard)	12
US Dance Airplay (Billboard)	16
US Pop Airplay (Billboard)	9
US Rolling Stone Top 100	15

=== Year-end charts ===
Chart (2019)	Position
Australia (ARIA)	52
Belgium (Ultratop Flanders)	49
Belgium (Ultratop Wallonia)	65
Canada (Canadian Hot 100)	66
Denmark (Tracklisten)	62
Iceland (Tónlistinn)	24
Latvia (LAIPA)	26
Netherlands (Dutch Top 40)	28
Netherlands (Single Top 100)	46
New Zealand (Recorded Music NZ)	49
Portugal (AFP)	96
Romania (Airplay 100)	40
Switzerland (Schweizer Hitparade)	71
UK Singles (OCC)	62
US Billboard Hot 100	83
US Adult Top 40 (Billboard)	38
US Mainstream Top 40 (Billboard)	37

== Certifications ==
Region	Certification	Certified units/sales
Australia (ARIA)	5× Platinum	350,000^{‡}
Austria (IFPI Austria)	Gold	15,000^{‡}
Belgium (BRMA)	Gold	20,000^{‡}
Brazil (Pro-Música Brasil)	2× Diamond	320,000^{‡}
Canada (Music Canada)	4× Platinum	320,000^{‡}
Denmark (IFPI Danmark)	Platinum	90,000^{‡}
France (SNEP)	Gold	100,000^{‡}
Germany (BVMI)	Gold	200,000^{‡}
Italy (FIMI)	Gold	25,000^{‡}
Mexico (AMPROFON)	2× Platinum	120,000^{‡}
New Zealand (RMNZ)	3× Platinum	90,000^{‡}
Norway (IFPI Norway)	2× Platinum	120,000^{‡}
Poland (ZPAV)	Platinum	20,000^{‡}
Portugal (AFP)	2× Platinum	20,000^{‡}
Spain (Promusicae)	Platinum	60,000^{‡}
United Kingdom (BPI)	Platinum	600,000^{‡}
United States (RIAA)	2× Platinum	2,000,000^{‡}
Streaming
Sweden (GLF)	Platinum	8,000,000^{†}
^{‡} Sales+streaming figures based on certification alone.^{†} Streaming-only figures based on certification alone.

== Release history ==
Region	Date	Format	Label	Ref.
Various	19 July 2019	Digital download; streaming	Capitol	
United States	23 July 2019	Top 40 radio	Capitol	
