= Love Goes =

2020 studio album by Sam Smith

Studio album by Sam Smith
- Released: 30 October 2020
- Studio: Various (see recording locations)
- Genres: Pop; dance-pop; R&B
- Length: 56:39
- Label: Capitol
- Producers: Louis Bell; Steve Fitzmaurice; Oscar Görres; Calvin Harris; Ilya; Labrinth; Guy Lawrence (of Disclosure); Jimmy Napes; Dave Odlum; Shellback; Stargate; Steve Mac; Two Inch Punch; Linus "Lotus IV" Wiklund; Andrew "Watt" Wotman

Sam Smith chronology
Diva Boy (2019)	Love Goes (2020)	Love Goes: Live at Abbey Road Studios (2021)

Singles from Love Goes
- 1. "My Oasis" Released: 30 July 2020; 2. "Diamonds" Released: 18 September 2020; 3. "Kids Again" Released: 30 October 2020

Love Goes is the third studio album by the English singer-songwriter Sam Smith. It was released on 30 October 2020 through Capitol Records. The album serves as a follow-up to Smith's second studio album The Thrill of It All (2017). Originally planned to be titled To Die For, the album was due for release on 1 May 2020 but was delayed amid the COVID-19 pandemic. The album was promoted by the singles "My Oasis", "Diamonds" and "Kids Again".

Love Goes debuted in the top-ten on various official charts, including in Australia, Canada, Ireland, New Zealand and Switzerland. In the United Kingdom, it debuted at number two, Smith's only album not to top the Official Albums Chart, while it peaked at number five on the US Billboard 200. It has sold over 4.5 million copies worldwide, as of 2021.

== Background ==
In an interview with Zach Sang in October 2019, Smith confirmed that their third album would be released in 2020, and said it would feature "fewer ballads and plenty of poppier tracks" than their previous albums, which they called an "acoustic-y, soulful version of pop music". Smith went on to explain that the reception to their recent songs had "almost given me permission to kinda do what I've always dreamed of doing but I was always scared to do, which is pop music." Smith described the album as their "first proper heartbreak album". In an interview with Apple Music's Zane Lowe, Smith said

"I'd say [this was] the first proper time I've been actually heartbroken. That feeling of they're gone, you can't sleep, the really, really bad feeling. The others were the idea of it and it was pure unrequited love. This, I would like to say that we loved each other. So, I definitely, definitely loved him. So yeah, it was proper."

— Smith speaking to Zane Lowe.

Smith opened a pop-up store in Soho, London named after the album in February 2020 before the release of the single "To Die For".

== Release and title ==
Originally planned to be titled To Die For, Smith's third album was due to be released on 1 May 2020, but was then pushed back to 5 June 2020. By the end of March, Smith had confirmed that they had decided to delay the album till later in the year amid the COVID-19 pandemic. On their social media account, they posted the following message: "I have done a lot of thinking the last few weeks and feel that the title of my album and imminent release doesn't feel right ... I have to come to the decision to continue working on the album and make some important changes and additions. I will be renaming the album and pushing back the release date—both of which are to be confirmed at this time".

On Friday 17 April, Smith explained the reasons for changing the album during an interview with Zoe Ball on BBC Radio 2, stating that the "album had the word 'die' in the title, which I just felt really uncomfortable with, with what's happening [coronavirus] and it's so important for me to be sensitive to my fans and to people listening to my music. This has been a really sad and awful time for us, so I've changed the album title, I'm going to change the album cover." The original cover art depicted Smith facing head-on with hands all around them. The hands on the album cover belong to Smith's "chosen family", Shea Diamond, Alok Menon, Jeff Hova, and Madison Phillips. Upon postponing the album, Smith announced that a new cover art would be produced.

== Singles ==
Before its delay, Smith had released a number of singles in promotion of the album. "Promises" with Calvin Harris, "Fire on Fire" from the miniseries Watership Down, "Dancing with a Stranger" with Normani, "How Do You Sleep?", "I Feel Love" (Smith's cover of Donna Summer's 1977 single), "To Die For", and "I'm Ready" with Demi Lovato were all included on the album's original preorder, but are now all included as bonus tracks on the album, with the exception of "I Feel Love".

"My Oasis" featuring Burna Boy was released as the lead single from the album on 30 July 2020, followed by the second single "Diamonds" on 18 September 2020. With the release of the album, the music video for "Kids Again" was released. It serves as the third single.

== Critical reception ==
Professional ratings
Aggregate scores
Source	Rating
AnyDecentMusic?	6.1/10
Metacritic	64/100
Review scores
Source	Rating
AllMusic	3/5 stars
Clash	6/10
Entertainment Weekly	B+
The Guardian	2/5 stars
The Independent	3/5 stars
The Line of Best Fit	7/10
NME	3/5 stars
Pitchfork	6.1/10
Rolling Stone	3/5 stars

On Metacritic, which assigns a normalised rating out of 100 to reviews from mainstream publications, Love Goes received an average score of 64 based on 13 reviews, indicating "generally favorable reviews". Alexis Petridis's review for The Guardian described Love Goes as a "heartbreak album [that] plays it safe in hard times", noting that "Smith attempts to mix despair with euphoria on an album that delivers plenty of gloom but not much glitter". In terms of production, Petridis said the album did differ from Smith's previous work in that it swapped "retro-soul afflictions" for "misty pop-facing electronics, gentle tropical house shadings and Auto-Tuned backing vocals". Robin Murray of Clash awarded the album six out of ten, calling it "a tale of heartbreak that could benefit from focus", noting that the track listing contained 17 songs and although there were some "exemplary pop moments", "it struggles to maintain momentum". Similarly, The Independent's Fiona Sturges referred to Love Goes as one of the "reasonable break-up albums you're likely to hear" and that you would "long for it to land a few punches". Elsewhere in the review, Sturges said "For the most part, the mood here is pensive, the ballads plentiful and the pace glacial, with little evidence of the wild abandon that the singer supposedly longs for. It's to Smith's credit, but also their undoing, that they are just too damned nice." In her review for NME, Ilana Kaplan said that although Smith said the album would have "fewer ballads and plenty of poppier tracks", "at its core its Smith's knack for sap and soul – and their singular, chilling vocals – that forms the base of the record. When it comes to songwriting, Smith oscillates towards what they know."

In writing a review for The New York Times, Jon Pareles was more complimentary, focussing on Smith's voice, calling it "a prodigious instrument: a pearly, androgynous croon, at once powerful and defenseless." Noting Smith's work with familiar collaborators (Jimmy Napes, Guy Lawrence and Stargate, amongst others), Pareles said "they built neatly structured, immediately legible pop tracks that open up arena-sized reverberations and sometimes beckon toward the dance floor. Many of Smith's new songs also stir in a strong new emotion: the resentment of a lover betrayed. The bile and the beat cut through the self-pity, though it wouldn't be a Sam Smith album without a good wallow or five.". Entertainment Weekly's Leah Greenblatt was also complimentary of the album, saying "the record remains rooted in a sort of open-vein vulnerability; the bruised, tender manifesto of a Kid Who Cares Too Much." She praised the album's ballads: "it's the prettily composed ballads — wounded, swooning, steeped in regret — that tend to lead", particularly picking out "For the Lover That I Lost" and "Breaking Hearts".

== Commercial performance ==
Love Goes debuted at number five on the US Billboard 200 chart, earning 41,000 album-equivalent units in its first week, including 18,000 copies as pure album sales and accumulating a total of 29.66 million on-demand streams that week. This became Smith's third US top-ten album. In the United Kingdom Love Goes debuted at number two on the Official Albums Chart, stopped by Positions by Ariana Grande published in the same week. It became Smith first album not to reach number one on the chart. In May 2021, Universal Music UK has stated that Love Goes has reached 4.5 million in global units.

== Track listing ==
Love Goes track listing
No.	Title	Writer(s)	Producer(s)	Length
1.	"Young"	Sam Smith; Steve Mac	Mac	2:32
2.	"Diamonds"	Smith; Oscar Görres; Johan "Shellback" Schuster	Görres; Shellback	3:32
3.	"Another One"	Smith; Noonie Bao; Linus "Lotus IV" Wiklund	Lotus IV; Guy Lawrence; Brendan Grieve^{[a]}	3:07
4.	"My Oasis" (featuring Burna Boy)	Smith; James Napier; Damini Ogulu	Napes; Ilya^{[b]}	2:59
5.	"So Serious"	Smith; Bao; Wiklund	Lotus IV	2:51
6.	"Dance ('Til You Love Someone Else)"	Smith; Amy Allen; Ben Ash	Two Inch Punch; Lawrence	3:43
7.	"For the Lover That I Lost"	Smith; Napier; Mikkel S. Eriksen; Tor Hermansen	Napes; Stargate	2:56
8.	"Breaking Hearts"	Smith; Napier	Napes	2:42
9.	"Forgive Myself"	Smith; Napier; Eriksen; Hermansen	Napes; Stargate	3:39
10.	"Love Goes" (featuring Labrinth)	Smith; Timothy McKenzie	Labrinth	4:44
11.	"Kids Again"	Smith; Ryan Tedder; Ali Tamposi; Andrew Wotman; Louis Bell	Andrew Watt; Bell	3:27
Total length:				36:12

Love Goes bonus tracks
No.	Title	Writer(s)	Producer(s)	Length
12.	"Dancing with a Stranger" (with Normani)	Smith; Napier; Eriksen; Hermansen; Normani Hamilton	Napes; StarGate	2:51
13.	"How Do You Sleep?"	Smith; Savan Kotecha; Max Martin; Ilya Salmanzadeh	Ilya	3:22
14.	"To Die For"	Smith; Napier; Hermansen; Eriksen	Napes; StarGate	3:13
15.	"I'm Ready" (with Demi Lovato)	Smith; Lovato; Kotecha; Salmanzadeh; Peter Svensson	Ilya	3:20
16.	"Fire on Fire"	Smith; Mac	Mac	4:06
17.	"Promises" (with Calvin Harris)	Smith; Jessie Reyez; Adam Wiles	Harris	3:35
Total length:				56:39

Target edition bonus tracks
No.	Title	Writer(s)	Producer(s)	Length
18.	"Sober"	Smith; Napier	Napes	3:09
19.	"Laurel Canyon"	Smith; Hermansen; Eriksen; Ilsey Juber	Stargate	3:28
Total length:				63:16

Japanese CD edition bonus track
No.	Title	Writer(s)	Producer(s)	Length
20.	"Fix You" (live)	Chris Martin; Guy Berryman; Johnny Buckland; Will Champion	Dave Odlum; Steve Fitzmaurice	4:17
Total length:				67:33

Notes

- ^{^[a]} vocal producer only.
- ^{^[b]} also vocal producer.
- "For the Lover That I Lost" was originally recorded by Celine Dion and included on her album Courage (2019).
- According to the album credits, "Promises" contains vocals from Jessie Reyez, though Reyez is not credited as "featured" on the song.

== Personnel and credits ==
Credits adapted from Smith's official website.

=== Recording locations ===
- Abbey Road Studios; London, UK (recording – track 16)
- BLND Studios; Sweden (recording – track 15)
- Do a Little Dance Studios; Stockholm, Sweden (recording – track 2)
- God's Eye Studios; Los Angeles, California (mixing – track 17)
- Gold Tooth Music; Beverly Hills, California (recording – track 11)
- House Mouse Studios; Stockholm, Sweden (recording – track 2)
- Kensal Town Studios; London, UK (recording – track 18)
- London Lane Studios; London, UK (recording – track 4, 8, 18)
- Lotus Library; Los Angeles, California (recording – track 3, 5)
- Lotus Lounge; Stockholm, Sweden (recording – track 3, 5)
- MixStar Studios; Virginia Beach, Virginia (mixing – track 2–3, 5–6, 13, 15–16)
- MXM Studios; Los Angeles, California (recording – track 4, 13, 15)
- MXM Studios; Stockholm, Sweden (recording – track 15)
- Pacifique Studios; Los Angeles, California (mixing – track 12)
- Platinum Door Studios; Atlanta, Georgia (mixing – track 14)
- RAK Studios; London, UK (recording – track 2, 7, 10)
- Rokstone Studios; London, UK (recording – track 1, 7)
- Sterling Sound; (Nashville, Tennessee) (mastering – track 2–9, 11–16, 18–19)
- The Exchange (Mike Marsh Mastering); Devon, UK (mastering – track 17)
- The Mixsuite; Los Angeles, California (mixing – track 11)
- The Pierce Rooms; London, UK (mixing – track 4, 7–10, 18–20)
- The Stellar House; Venice, California (recording – track 9, 12, 14)
- The Windmill Recording Studios; Norfolk, UK (recording – track 20)
- Yewtree Close Studio; London, UK (recording – track 10)

=== Personnel ===
Artists

- Burna Boy – featured vocals (track 4)
- Calvin Harris – co-lead artist (track 17)
- Demi Lovato – co-lead vocals (track 15)
- Jessie Reyez – additional vocals (track 17)
- Labrinth – featured vocals, background vocals (track 10)
- Normani – co-lead vocals (track 12)
- Sam Smith – lead vocals, background vocals (track 15)

Musicians and producers

- Simon Baggs – violin (track 6)
- Louis Bell – producer (track 11), programming (track 11), keyboards (track 11)
- Natalie Bonner – violin (track 10)
- Ian Burdge – 1st cello (track 7, track 10)
- Joby Burgess – percussion (track 10)
- Eos Chater – violin (track 6)
- Reiad Chibah – 2nd viola (track 7)
- Caroline Dale – cello section (track 10)
- Mikkel S. Eriksen – recording (track 9, 12)
- Philip Eastop – French horn (track 10)
- Jonathan Evans-Jones – violin (track 6)
- Rob Farrer – percussion (track 10)
- Louisa Fuller – violin (track 6)
- Richard George – violin (track 6, 10), 2nd violins (leader) (track 7)
- Tim Gill – 1st cello (track 6)
- Oscar Görres – producer (track 2), programming (track 2), piano (track 2), keys (track 2), guitar (track 2)
- Kathy Gowers – violin (track 10)
- Brendan Grieve – vocal producer (track 3)
- Simon Hale – strings conductor and arrangement (track 6, 7, 10)
- Ollie Heath – violin (track 6)
- Darren Heelis – juno bass (played and recorded by) (track 4, 9), additional programming (track 8), Wurlitzer (track 9)
- Ian Humphreys – violin (track 10)
- Ilya – keys (track 4), drums (track 4, 13), live percussion (track 4), programming (track 4, 13), vocal producer (track 4), producer (track 13), arranger (track 13), keyboard (track 13), synthesizers (track 13), bass (track 13)
- Ruben James – piano (track 7)
- Ben Jones – acoustic guitar (track 4), electric guitar (track 4), guitar overdubbing (track 12)
- Patrick Kiernan – violin (track 6, 10)
- Rick Koster – violin (track 6)
- Labrinth – producer (track 10), drums (track 10), guitars (track 10), engineer (track 10), FX (track 10)
- Guy Lawrence (of Disclosure) – producer (track 3, 6), keyboard (track 3), drums (track 3), programming (track 3, 5), instrumentation (track 3, 5)
- Lotus IV – producer (track 3, 5), keyboard (track 3, 5), drums (track 3, 5), programming (track 3), instrumentation (track 3), arranger (track 5)
- Steve Mac – producer (track 1)
- Vicky Matthews – cello section (track 10)
- John Metcalfe – viola section co-ordinator (track 6)
- Jodi Milliner – bass (track 7)
- Perry Montague-Mason – violin (track 10)
- Steve Morris – 2nd violins (track 7), violin (track 10)
- Jimmy Napes – producer (track 4, 7, 8, 9, 12), bass (track 4, 8), synths (track 4), programming (track 4, 8, 9), piano (track 8), guitar (track 8), instruments (track 9)
- Everton Nelson – 1st violin (leader) (track 7, 10)
- Dan Newell – trumpets (track 10)
- Pete North – bass trombone (track 10)
- Tom Piggot-Smith – leader (1st violin) (track 6)
- Hayley Pomfrett – violin (track 6)
- Richard Pryce – double bass (track 10)
- Tom Rees-Roberts – trumpets (track 10)
- Shellback – producer (track 2), programming (track 2), drums (track 2), guitar (track 2), bass (track 2), epic triangle (track 2)
- Owen Slade – tuba (track 10)
- Stargate – producer (track 7, 9, 12), programming (track 9, 12), instruments (track 9, 12)
- Toby Street – trumpets (track 10)
- Ali Tamposi – background vocals (track 11)
- Ed Tarrant – tenor trombone (track 10), tenor (track 10)
- Ryan Tedder – keyboards (track 11), background vocals (track 11)
- Two Inch Punch – producer (track 6)
- Andrew Watt – producer (track 11), guitar (track 11), bass (track 11), drums (track 11), percussion (track 11), background vocals (track 11)
- Bruce White – 1st viola (track 6, 7), violin (track 10)
- Rupert Whitehead – tenor trombone (track 10)
- Lucy wilkins – violin (track 10)
- Chris Worsey – cello section co-ordinator (track 6), 2nd cello (track 7), cello section (track 10)
- Warren Zielinski – 1st violin (track 7), violin (track 10)

Technicians

- Cory Bice – engineer (track 13)
- Kevin "KD" Davis – engineer (track 12, 14)
- Marek Deml – assistant mixing (track 7, 9, 18, 19)
- Dan Ewins – Pro Tools operator (strings) (track 7)
- Steve Fitzmaurice – mixing (track 4, 7, 8, 9, 10), engineer (track 7), producer (track 20)
- Duncan Fuller – assistant engineer (track 2)
- Serban Ghenea – mixing (track 2, 3, 5, 6, 13)
- John Hanes – engineer (track 2, 3, 5, 6, 13)
- Liam Hebb – assistant strings engineer (track 7)
- Sam Holland – engineer (track 13)
- Mike Horner – strings, bass and percussion engineer (track 10), engineer (track 10)
- Paul LaMalfa – engineer/recording (track 11)
- Chris Laws – mixing (track 1), engineer (track 1)
- Jeremy Lertola – engineer (track 13)
- Emma Marks – assistant engineer (track 10)
- Randy Merrill – mastering (track 1, 2, 3, 4, 5, 6, 8, 9, 10, 11, 12, 13, 14)
- Robbie Nelson – engineer (track 10)
- Gus Pirelli – recording (track 8)
- Danny Pursey – engineer (track 1)
- Mark "Spike" Stent – mixing (track 11)
- Idania Valencia – mastering (track 7)
- Thomas Warren – recording (track 9, 12)
- Matt Wolach – mixing (assistant) (track 11)

== Charts ==
=== Weekly charts ===
Weekly chart performance for Love Goes
Chart (2020)	Peak position
Australian Albums (ARIA)	3
Austrian Albums (Ö3 Austria)	16
Belgian Albums (Ultratop Flanders)	5
Belgian Albums (Ultratop Wallonia)	18
Canadian Albums (Billboard)	3
Czech Albums (ČNS IFPI)	59
Danish Albums (Hitlisten)	12
Dutch Albums (Album Top 100)	6
Finnish Albums (Suomen virallinen lista)	14
French Albums (SNEP)	29
German Albums (Offizielle Top 100)	11
Irish Albums (Official Charts)	3
Italian Albums (FIMI)	20
Japan Hot Albums (Billboard Japan)	34
Japanese Albums (Oricon)	50
New Zealand Albums (RMNZ)	4
Norwegian Albums (VG-lista)	6
Polish Albums (ZPAV)	14
Portuguese Albums (AFP)	14
Scottish Albums (Official Charts)	3
Slovak Albums (ČNS IFPI)	41
South Korean Albums (Gaon)	85
Spanish Albums (Promusicae)	13
Swedish Albums (Sverigetopplistan)	12
Swiss Albums (Schweizer Hitparade)	6
UK Albums (Official Charts)	2
US Billboard 200	5

=== Year-end charts ===
2020 year-end chart performance for Love Goes
Chart (2020)	Position
UK Albums (OCC)	59

2021 year-end chart performance for Love Goes
Chart (2021)	Position
Australian Albums (ARIA)	43
New Zealand Albums (RMNZ)	37
Spanish Albums (PROMUSICAE)	94
UK Albums (OCC)	70
US Billboard 200	191

== Certifications ==
Certifications for Love Goes
Region	Certification	Certified units/sales
Australia (ARIA)	Platinum	70,000^{‡}
Canada (Music Canada)	2× Platinum	160,000^{‡}
Denmark (IFPI Danmark)	Gold	10,000^{‡}
France (SNEP)	Gold	50,000^{‡}
Italy (FIMI)	Gold	25,000^{‡}
Mexico (AMPROFON)	Platinum+Gold	90,000^{‡}
New Zealand (RMNZ)	Platinum	15,000^{‡}
Norway (IFPI Norway)	3× Platinum	60,000^{‡}
Poland (ZPAV)	2× Platinum	40,000^{‡}
Portugal (AFP)	Gold	3,500^{‡}
Singapore (RIAS)	Platinum	10,000^{*}
United Kingdom (BPI)	Platinum	300,000^{‡}
United States (RIAA)	Platinum	1,000,000^{‡}
^{*} Sales figures based on certification alone.^{‡} Sales+streaming figures based on certification alone.

== Release history ==
Release history for Love Goes
Region	Date	Format	Version	Label	Ref.
Various	30 October 2020	Cassette; CD; digital download; streaming; LP	Original	Capitol	
Japan	30 October 2020	CD	Japanese edition	Capitol	
United States	13 November 2020	LP	Target exclusive	Capitol	

== Love Goes: Live at Abbey Road Studios ==
Love Goes: Live at Abbey Road Studios

Live album by Sam Smith
- Released: 19 March 2021
- Venues: Abbey Road Studios (London, UK)
- Length: 48:47
- Label: Capitol

Sam Smith chronology
Love Goes (2020)	Love Goes: Live at Abbey Road Studios (2021)	Gloria (2023)

Love Goes: Live at Abbey Road Studios is the third live album by the English singer-songwriter Sam Smith, and was released on 19 March 2021 by Capitol Records. The album was recorded at Abbey Road Studios as special concert held on 30 October 2020 to promote the release of the singer's third studio album Love Goes.

The live album features song's from Smith's third album Love Goes (2020), as well as previous singles "Stay with Me" and "Lay Me Down" from debut album In the Lonely Hour (2014) and "Too Good at Goodbyes" from 2017's The Thrill of It All. For the live album, Smith also covered Cyndi Lauper's 1984 song "Time After Time".

In a weekly round-up of LGBT+/queer releases for Billboard that week, Stephen Daw said "regardless of what's being sung, Love Goes: Live at Abbey Road Studios shows off Smith's phenomenal vocal talent yet again." Smith's cover of "Time After Time" was called "faithful" by Rolling Stone's Jon Blistein.

Love Goes: Live at Abbey Road Studios was released on Netflix on 22 May 2021.

=== Track listing ===
Love Goes: Live at Abbey Road Studios track listing
No.	Title	Writer(s)	Length
1.	"Young" (physical editions only)	Sam Smith; Steve Mac
2.	"Diamonds"	Smith; Oscar Görres; Johan "Shellback" Schuster	3:34
3.	"Dancing with a Stranger"	Smith; James Napier; Mikkel S. Eriksen; Tor Hermansen; Normani Hamilton	3:51
4.	"Promises"	Smith; Jessie Reyez; Adam Wiles	4:34
5.	"Too Good at Goodbyes"	Smith; Napier; Eriksen; Hermansen	3:37
6.	"Lay Me Down"	Smith; Napier; Elvin Smith	4:33
7.	"My Oasis" (featuring Jade Anouka)	Smith; Napier; Damini Ogulu	5:28
8.	"Time After Time"	Cyndi Lauper; Rob Hyman	3:52
9.	"How Do You Sleep?"	Smith; Savan Kotecha; Max Martin; Ilya Salmanzadeh	3:30
10.	"For the Lover That I Lost"	Smith; Napier; Eriksen; Hermansen	3:05
11.	"Kids Again"	Smith; Ryan Tedder; Ali Tamposi; Andrew Wotman; Louis Bell	3:35
12.	"Love Goes" (featuring Labrinth)	Smith; Timothy McKenzie	5:22
13.	"Stay with Me"	Smith; Napier; William Phillips; Tom Petty; Jeff Lynne	3:46
Total length:			48:47

=== Charts ===
Weekly chart performance for Love Goes: Live from Abbey Road
Chart (2021)	Peak position
French Albums (SNEP)	129
US Top Current Album Sales (Billboard)	80

=== Release history ===
Release history for Love Goes: Live at Abbey Studios
Region	Date	Format	Label	Ref.
Various	19 March 2021	LP; digital download; streaming	Capitol	
Japan	19 March 2021	CD; LP; digital download; streaming	Capitol	
