= Dancing with a Stranger =

2019 single by Sam Smith and Normani

Single by Sam Smith and Normani
- Released: 11 January 2019
- Studio: The Stellar House (Venice, Los Angeles)
- Genre: Disco; R&B; pop
- Length: 2:51
- Label: Capitol
- Songwriters: Sam Smith; Jimmy Napes; Mikkel S. Eriksen; Tor E. Hermansen; Normani Kordei Hamilton
- Producers: Stargate; Jimmy Napes

Sam Smith singles chronology
"Fire on Fire" (2018)	"Dancing with a Stranger" (2019)	"How Do You Sleep?" (2019)

Normani singles chronology
"Waves" (2018)	"Dancing with a Stranger" (2019)	"Motivation" (2019)

Music video
- "Dancing with a Stranger" on YouTube

"Dancing with a Stranger" is a song by the English singer Sam Smith and American singer Normani. It was written by the two, alongside producers Stargate and Jimmy Napes. "Dancing with a Stranger" was released as a single by Capitol Records on 11 January 2019. It appears on Smith's third studio album Love Goes (2020). The accompanying music video was directed by Vaughan Arnell.

The track became a commercial success, topping the charts in Mexico, Iceland, and Lebanon. It also peaked at number three on the UK singles chart. In the United States, it reached number seven on the Billboard Hot 100 and spent a total of 45 weeks on the chart. The track reached the top ten in seventeen additional countries. "Dancing with a Stranger" was the most-played radio track in the world in 2019, according to Forbes. The single is certified 4× Platinum in the US, 8× Platinum in Australia, and Platinum or higher in nine additional countries. It won the Song of the Year award at the 2020 BMI London Awards, and was nominated for Song of 2019 at the People's Choice Awards and Song of the Year at the 2020 Brit Awards.

== Background and composition ==
According to Billboard, the collaboration happened through a chance encounter at a recording studio in Los Angeles. When Smith was writing a track with their frequent collaborator Jimmy Napes and the Norwegian production team Stargate, Normani happened to be in the studio next door. After talking, the two decided to work together.

Musically, "Dancing with a Stranger" is a disco-R&B and pop duet that contains 1980s-inspired R&B production. Smith, Normani, Napes, and Stargate wrote the song. The latter two also handled production for the track, alongside Danny D and Tim Blacksmith. Journalist Monica Mercuri of Forbes described the single as "sultry" and showing off the singer's "powerful" vocals. David Renshaw, writing for The Fader, called the song a "veer away from [Smith's] gentle soul sound". Lyrically, the song is about coping with loneliness and moving past a lost love. The song is composed in the key of A-flat major, with a tempo of 103 bpm in common time, according to Musicnotes.com.

== Critical reception ==
Brittany Spanos, writing for Rolling Stone, stated that the song "plays to [Smith's] retro-leaning strengths and Normani's own solo vision of being a Sexy soul-dance diva". She concluded her review by calling the song "simple and fun". Rose Dommu of Out praised the duo's vocals, saying Normani's "sultry voice is the perfect counterpoint to Smith's own deep tone". Mike Nied of Idolator wrote that the song "expertly capture the frustration and loneliness of heartbreak, bottling it and presenting it as something both deeply personal and infinitely relatable". Billboard magazine called the song a "sexy earworm", lauding the pair's "standout vocal delivery", with Smith's "seductive falsetto accompanied by Normani's smoky counterpart".

Associated Press ranked it as the 2nd Best Song of 2019. Billboard ranked it 38th on their Best Songs of 2019 list. The song received praise from actress Reese Witherspoon, who dubbed it the "Song of the Summer".

== Commercial performance ==
In the United Kingdom, "Dancing with a Stranger" peaked at number three on the UK Singles Chart in January 2019, becoming Smith's eleventh, and Normani's first top ten single in the UK as a solo artist. It was certified Platinum by the British Phonographic Industry. In the United States, the song peaked at number seven on the Billboard Hot 100 in April 2019, making it Smith's sixth and Normani's second top-ten single as a solo artist. In May 2019, "Dancing with a Stranger" topped the US Radio Songs chart, becoming Smith's second and Normani's second chart topper there. It also topped the US Adult Top 40 and reached number two on the Mainstream Top 40 chart, behind "Sucker" by the Jonas Brothers. The song also topped the Big Top 40 chart.

In other countries, "Dancing with a Stranger" peaked inside the top ten in Belgium, Denmark, Ireland, Australia, the Netherlands, New Zealand, Norway, Canada, South Africa, Singapore, Malaysia, Iceland, Lebanon, and Sweden. It was also certified 8× Platinum in Australia, 4× Platinum in Canada, 5× Platinum in New Zealand, and Gold in a few other European countries. "Dancing with a Stranger" was the most-played global radio song in 2019, according to Forbes. The song was also the 4th most-played song on the radio in 2019 in the US, receiving over 3.134 billion audience impressions, according to Billboard.

In March 2021, the single was named by the Official Charts as one of the most-streamed songs by a female artist in the United Kingdom. As of March 2022, the song has surpassed over three billion streams. It has sold over 10 million units worldwide, according to Capitol Records.

== Usage in the media and copyright accusations ==
"Dancing with a Stranger" was selected by music executive Clive Davis for his quarantine playlist, which compiled songs that he and Barry Manilow considered to be "the most impactful and lasting songs of the 21st century" that the latter was set to cover. 5 Seconds of Summer performed a cover of the song for BBC Radio 1's Live Lounge. The band's version won an iHeartRadio Music Award for Best Cover Song. Kelly Clarkson sang a rendition of the track during her Meaning of Life Tour and told the audience that the two singers inspire her to "keep making music."

=== Lawsuit ===
In 2022, Smith, Normani, and Stargate were all sued by Jordan Vincent, Christopher Miranda, and Rosco Banlaoi, who alleged that "Dancing with a Stranger" copied their 2015 song of the same name. According to Vincent, Miranda, and Banlaoi, "The hook/chorus in both songs—the most significant part and artistic aspect of these works—contains the lyrics 'dancing with a stranger' being sung over a nearly identical melody and musical composition"; the music video was also named in the infringement as both songs' videos contain similar elements.

Californian judge Wesley L. Hsu dismissed the case on Wednesday, 6 September 2023, saying that "most if not all of the plaintiff's claimed similarities" were not protectable by law, and that the phrase "dancing with a stranger" was not unique enough, pointing out "nearly 20 references" in other previous songs.

== Awards and nominations ==
Year	Award	Category	Result	Ref.
2019	Teen Choice Awards	Choice Pop Song	Nominated	
2019	Teen Choice Awards	Choice Collaboration Song	Nominated	
2019	People's Choice Awards	Music Video of 2019	Nominated	
2019	People's Choice Awards	Song of 2019	Nominated	
2019	MTV Play Awards	Winning Videos	Won	
2020	Global Awards	Best Song of 2019	Nominated	
2020	IHeartRadio Music Awards	Best Collaboration	Nominated	
2020	IHeartRadio Music Awards	Best Music Video	Nominated	
2020	IHeartRadio Music Awards	Titanium Award	Won	
2020	Brit Awards	Brit Award for Song of the Year	Nominated	
2020	Queerty Awards	Anthem	Nominated	
2020	ASCAP Award	Award Winning Songs	Won	
2020	BMI Awards	Award Winning Songs	Won	
2020	BMI London Awards	Song of the Year	Won	
2020	BMI London Awards	Pop Award Songs	Won	
2020	Ivor Novello Awards	PRS for Music Most Performed Work	Nominated	
2022	BMI London Awards	Million Awards: 4 Million	Won	

== Music video ==
The music video was released on 29 January 2019. The video was directed by Vaughan Arnell and was shot in London. It features Smith and Normani moving and dancing through a "sleek, stark home" while being surrounded by hologram projections of dancers.

The music video for "Dancing with a Stranger" was the most viewed in the United Kingdom on Vevo in 2019, and was the second most viewed video in the United Kingdom on YouTube in 2019.

== Formats and track listings ==
- Digital download
1. "Dancing with a Stranger" – 2:51
- Digital download (Acoustic)
1. "Dancing with a Stranger" (Acoustic) – 3:07
- Digital download (Cheat Codes Remix)
1. "Dancing with a Stranger" (Cheat Codes Remix) – 2:39
- 12-inch vinyl
1. "Dancing with a Stranger" – 2:51
2. "Dancing with a Stranger" (Instrumental) – 2:51

== Credits and personnel ==
Credits adapted from Tidal.

- Sam Smith – vocals, songwriting
- Normani – vocals, songwriting
- Jimmy Napes – songwriting, production
- Stargate – songwriting, production, music production
- Randy Merrill – master engineering
- Kevin "KD" Davis – mixing

== Charts ==
=== Weekly charts ===
Chart (2019–2020)	Peak position
Argentina (Argentina Hot 100)	75
Australia (ARIA)	6
Austria (Ö3 Austria Top 40)	38
Belgium (Ultratop 50 Flanders)	2
Belgium (Ultratop 50 Wallonia)	3
Bolivia (Monitor Latino)	10
Brazil (Top 100 Brasil)	54
Canada Hot 100 (Billboard)	8
Canada AC (Billboard)	3
Canada CHR/Top 40 (Billboard)	2
Canada Hot AC (Billboard)	3
China Airplay/FL (Billboard)	11
Colombia (National-Report)	41
CIS Airplay (TopHit)	8
Czech Republic Airplay (ČNS IFPI)	65
Czech Republic Singles Digital (ČNS IFPI)	17
Denmark (Tracklisten)	3
Euro Digital Song Sales (Billboard)	4
Finland (Suomen virallinen lista)	15
France (SNEP)	37
Germany (GfK)	37
Greece International (IFPI)	7
Global 200 (Billboard)	159
Hungary (Rádiós Top 40)	24
Hungary (Single Top 40)	32
Hungary (Stream Top 40)	14
Iceland (Tónlistinn)	1
Ireland (IRMA)	4
Italy (FIMI)	50
Japan Hot 100 (Billboard)	85
Latvia (LaIPA)	5
Lebanon (Lebanese Top 20)	1
Lithuania (AGATA)	2
Luxembourg Digital Song Sales (Billboard)	6
Malaysia (RIM)	4
Mexico Airplay (Billboard)	1
Netherlands (Dutch Top 40)	6
Netherlands (Single Top 100)	19
New Zealand (Recorded Music NZ)	7
Norway (VG-lista)	7
Panama (Monitor Latino)	19
Poland Airplay (ZPAV)	19
Portugal (AFP)	18
Puerto Rico (Monitor Latino)	11
Romania (Airplay 100)	13
Russia Airplay (TopHit)	7
Scottish Singles Sales (Official Charts)	2
Singapore (RIAS)	2
Slovakia Airplay (ČNS IFPI)	67
Slovakia Singles Digital (ČNS IFPI)	11
Slovenia (SloTop50)	6
Spain (Promusicae)	66
Sweden (Sverigetopplistan)	8
Switzerland (Schweizer Hitparade)	17
UK Singles (Official Charts)	3
Ukraine Airplay (TopHit)	79
US Billboard Hot 100	7
US Adult Contemporary (Billboard)	4
US Adult Pop Airplay (Billboard)	1
US Dance Club Songs (Billboard)	39
US Dance Airplay (Billboard)	6
US Pop Airplay (Billboard)	2
US R&B/Hip-Hop Airplay (Billboard)	39
US Rolling Stone Top 100	31

2024 Weekly chart performance for "Dancing with a Stranger"
Chart (2024)	Peak position
Moldova Airplay (TopHit)	76

=== Year-end charts ===
Chart (2019)	Position
Australia (ARIA)	19
Belgium (Ultratop Flanders)	21
Belgium (Ultratop Wallonia)	27
Canada (Canadian Hot 100)	14
CIS (Tophit)	30
Denmark (Tracklisten)	19
France (SNEP)	105
Iceland (Tónlistinn)	12
Ireland (IRMA)	23
Latvia (LAIPA)	46
Netherlands (Dutch Top 40)	43
Netherlands (Single Top 100)	63
New Zealand (Recorded Music NZ)	15
Portugal (AFP)	56
Romania (Airplay 100)	52
Russia (Top All Media Hits, Tophit)	32
Russia (Top Radio Hits, Tophit)	26
Slovenia (SloTop50)	7
Sweden (Sverigetopplistan)	54
Switzerland (Schweizer Hitparade)	62
Tokyo (Tokio Hot 100)	53
UK Singles (OCC)	22
US Billboard Hot 100	14
US Adult Contemporary (Billboard)	10
US Adult Top 40 (Billboard)	7
US Dance/Mix Show Airplay (Billboard)	8
US Mainstream Top 40 (Billboard)	5
US Rolling Stone Top 100	27

Chart (2020)	Position
US Adult Contemporary (Billboard)	18

== Certifications ==
Region	Certification	Certified units/sales
Australia (ARIA)	8× Platinum	560,000^{‡}
Austria (IFPI Austria)	Platinum	30,000^{‡}
Belgium (BRMA)	Platinum	40,000^{‡}
Brazil (Pro-Música Brasil)	3× Diamond	480,000^{‡}
Canada (Music Canada)	4× Platinum	320,000^{‡}
Denmark (IFPI Danmark)	2× Platinum	180,000^{‡}
France (SNEP)	Platinum	200,000^{‡}
Germany (BVMI)	Gold	200,000^{‡}
Italy (FIMI)	Platinum	70,000^{‡}
Mexico (AMPROFON)	4× Platinum	240,000^{‡}
New Zealand (RMNZ)	5× Platinum	150,000^{‡}
Norway (IFPI Norway)	2× Platinum	120,000^{‡}
Poland (ZPAV)	2× Platinum	40,000^{‡}
Portugal (AFP)	2× Platinum	20,000^{‡}
Spain (Promusicae)	Platinum	60,000^{‡}
Sweden (GLF)	2× Platinum	16,000,000^{†}
United Kingdom (BPI)	3× Platinum	1,800,000^{‡}
United States (RIAA)	4× Platinum	4,000,000^{‡}
^{‡} Sales+streaming figures based on certification alone.^{†} Streaming-only figures based on certification alone.

== Release history ==
Release history and formats for "Dancing with a Stranger"
Region	Date	Format(s)	Version(s)	Label	Ref.
Various	11 January 2019	Digital download; streaming	Original	Capitol	
Italy	11 January 2019	Radio airplay	Original	Sony	
United States	14 January 2019	AC radio; hot AC radio; modern AC radio	Original	Capitol	
United States	15 January 2019	Contemporary hit radio	Original	Capitol	
Various	15 February 2019	Digital download; streaming	Acoustic	Capitol	
Various	8 March 2019	Digital download; streaming	Cheat Codes remix	Capitol	
Various	8 March 2019	12-inch vinyl	Original; Instrumental	Capitol	
