= Happiest Season =

2020 film by Clea DuVall

- Official release poster
- Directed by: Clea DuVall
- Screenplay by: Clea DuVall; Mary Holland
- Story by: Clea DuVall
- Produced by: Isaac Klausner; Marty Bowen
- Starring: Kristen Stewart; Mackenzie Davis; Alison Brie; Aubrey Plaza; Daniel Levy; Mary Holland; Victor Garber; Mary Steenburgen
- Cinematography: John Guleserian
- Edited by: Melissa Bretherton
- Music by: Amie Doherty
- Production companies: TriStar Pictures; TriStar Productions; Entertainment One; Temple Hill Entertainment
- Distributed by: Hulu
- Release date: November 25, 2020
- Running time: 102 minutes
- Country: United States
- Language: English
- Box office: $2.1 million

Happiest Season is a 2020 American romantic comedy film directed by Clea DuVall, who co-wrote the screenplay with Mary Holland. Starring an ensemble cast consisting of Kristen Stewart, Mackenzie Davis, Alison Brie, Aubrey Plaza, Daniel Levy, Holland, Victor Garber, and Mary Steenburgen, the film follows a young woman who struggles to admit to her conservative parents that she is a lesbian while she and her girlfriend visit them during Christmas. A semi-autobiographical take on DuVall's experiences with her family, Happiest Season is the first lesbian Christmas rom-com produced by a major Hollywood studio.

Produced by TriStar Pictures, Entertainment One and Temple Hill Entertainment, Happiest Season was released in the United States on November 25, 2020, by Hulu. The film received positive reviews from critics, with praise for the cast. The film won a GLAAD Media Award in 2021 in the Outstanding Film – Wide Release category.

== Plot ==
Abby Holland and Harper Caldwell are a couple who have been dating for nearly a year. Abby has disliked Christmas since her parents died, so Harper spontaneously invites her to celebrate the holidays with her family in her hometown. Abby sees this as the perfect opportunity to introduce herself to Harper's parents and propose to her on Christmas morning. However, on their way to the Caldwells', Harper reveals she lied about already coming out to her parents, fearing it would interfere with her father's mayoral campaign. She promises to come out to her family after Christmas but asks Abby to pretend to be her heterosexual roommate for the holiday, to which Abby reluctantly agrees.

At the Caldwells', Abby meets Harper's father, Ted, her perfectionist mother, Tipper, and her artistic sister, Jane. She is welcomed by the family as Harper's "orphan friend" who has nowhere else to go for Christmas. Abby soon becomes uncomfortable, especially when she meets Harper's exes, Connor and Riley. She also begins questioning how much she knows about her girlfriend when she sees Ted and Tipper's high expectations and Harper's competitive relationship with her older sister, Sloane.

Ted is trying to impress a possible donor from the city council to contribute to his campaign, which Abby unwittingly jeopardizes when Sloane's children slip an unpaid-for necklace into her bag during an outing to the mall. Labeled a shoplifter, Ted and Tipper think it might be better if they keep Abby away from upcoming social events. As Abby starts to feel even more of an outsider, she learns from Riley that Harper has publicly denied her sexuality since high school, making her worried about their future.

At the Caldwells' annual Christmas Eve party, Abby, having tired of her situation, is relieved when her best friend John arrives to pick her up. Harper privately begs her to stay, and as they are about to kiss, they are caught by Sloane who prepares to expose their relationship to the family. However, it turns out that Sloane has her own secret: she and her husband, Eric, are getting a divorce. The sisters get into a public fight, ending with Sloane outing Harper as a lesbian, which Harper tries to deny. Heartbroken, Abby leaves the house, with John following her, and the two talk about their stories of coming out to their respective families: Abby's parents were loving and accepting, while John's father threw him out of their home and did not talk to him for thirteen years. John reminds Abby that coming out can be terrifying for gay people, but has nothing to do with Harper's love for her.

Realizing her fear of rejection caused her to hurt Riley and may cause her to lose Abby, Harper confirms to her parents that she is a lesbian. This inspires Sloane to reveal her own secret, and even Jane tells her parents how neglected she felt over the years. Afterward, Tipper confronts Ted about the emotional pain their daughters have experienced due to their parenting choices. Harper goes after Abby to apologize, confessing that she truly loves her and wants to build a life with her. Touched, and with encouragement from John, Abby forgives her and they kiss.

The next morning, Ted apologizes to his daughters for making them feel they always had to meet his standard of perfection. He later receives a phone call from the campaign donor, who will support him only if Harper suppresses any details about her personal life. Ted rejects the offer. The Caldwells then take a family picture, with Abby included this time.

One year later, Abby and Harper are engaged, Jane has become a bestselling author with her fantasy novel, The Shadow Dreamers, and Ted has won the mayoral election. On Christmas Eve, the family goes to the cinema to watch It's a Wonderful Life. As the film starts, Abby and Harper smile at each other lovingly.

== Cast ==
- Kristen Stewart as Abby Holland, Harper's girlfriend
- Mackenzie Davis as Harper Caldwell, Abby's girlfriend
- Alison Brie as Sloane Caldwell, Harper's eldest sister
- Aubrey Plaza as Riley Johnson, Harper's ex-girlfriend
- Daniel Levy as John, Abby's best friend
- Mary Holland as Jane Caldwell, Harper's middle sister
- Victor Garber as Ted Caldwell, Harper's father
- Mary Steenburgen as Tipper Caldwell, Harper's mother
- Ana Gasteyer as Harry Levin, a potential campaign donor
- Jake McDorman as Connor, Harper's ex-boyfriend
- Burl Moseley as Eric, Sloane's husband
- Sarayu Blue as Carolyn McCoy
- Jinkx Monsoon as Em K. Ultra
- BenDeLaCreme as Miss L'Teau
- Anis N'Dobe as Magnus, Sloane and Eric's son
- Asiyih N'Dobe as Matilda, Sloane and Eric's daughter

== Production ==
In April 2018, TriStar Pictures acquired the worldwide distribution rights to the film Happiest Season, with Clea DuVall set to direct from a script she co-wrote with Mary Holland, and production by Marty Bowen and Isaac Klausner through their Temple Hill Productions, with co-financing from Entertainment One, whose theatrical arm handled UK and Canadian distribution, and with Sony Pictures handling distribution elsewhere through the TriStar label. DuVall said that "in a lot of ways, this movie is autobiographical" and she wrote the film to see her own experiences depicted on-screen.

In November 2018, Kristen Stewart signed on to star in the film, with Mackenzie Davis joining the cast in January 2019. The remaining cast was rounded out in January 2020, with the additions of Mary Steenburgen, Victor Garber, Alison Brie, Aubrey Plaza, and Daniel Levy.

Principal photography began on January 21, 2020, in Pittsburgh and wrapped on February 28, 2020, shortly before the film industry was halted due to the COVID-19 pandemic. During an interview on The Late Show with Stephen Colbert in December 2020, Plaza revealed that various people on set, including Stewart, tested positive for COVID-19 around the time they were filming.

== Music ==
=== Soundtrack ===
Happiest Season: Music from and Inspired by the Film

Soundtrack album by Various Artists
- Released: November 6, 2020
- Recorded: 2020
- Genre: Film soundtrack
- Label: Warner Records

Singles from Happiest Season: Music from and Inspired by the Film
- 1. "Make You Mine This Season" Released: October 30, 2020

The soundtrack of the film was released on November 6, 2020. The soundtrack stays true to the film's holiday premise, as it mostly consists of Christmas music and features new Christmas tunes by queer artists such as Sia, Shea Diamond, and sister act Tegan and Sara. Their synth-pop song "Make You Mine This Season" became the prototype for the rest of the soundtrack, all the other songs were written after it.

No.	Title	Length
1.	"Think of Christmas" (Anne-Marie)	2:50
2.	"Blame It on Christmas" (Bebe Rexha and Shea Diamond)	2:39
3.	"Jingle Bells" (BAYLI)	2:39
4.	"Mrs. Claus" (Shea Diamond)	2:55
5.	"O Holy Night" (Jake Wesley Rogers)	4:01
6.	"Candy Cane Lane" (Sia)	3:32
7.	"Only Time of Year" (Brandy Clark)	2:58
8.	"Christmas Morning" (Kennedi)	2:41
9.	"Chosen Family" (Carlie Hanson)	3:05
10.	"Make You Mine This Season" (Tegan and Sara)	3:06
11.	"Silent Night" (LP)	2:47
Total length:		33:17

=== Score ===
Happiest Season

Film score by Amie Doherty
- Released: November 20, 2020
- Recorded: 2020
- Genre: Original Motion Picture Score
- Label: Sony Music / Columbia Pictures

Amie Doherty film scores chronology
Undone (2019)	Happiest Season (2020)	Spirit Untamed (2021)

The film's score was released on November 20, 2020. It was composed by Amie Doherty, who is best known for her work in Legion and Star Trek: Discovery.

All tracks are written by Amie Doherty.

No.	Title	Length
1.	"Happiest Season Main Title"	1:39
2.	"Harper and Abby"	1:06
3.	"The Ring"	0:41
4.	"Season's Greetings from Pittsburgh"	0:42
5.	"It's Five Days (Jingle Bells)"	0:42
6.	"Rink Race"	0:53
7.	"March Into the Unknown"	1:17
8.	"Table for One"	0:42
9.	"Tipper Top Shape"	0:41
10.	"The Game Is Up"	1:08
11.	"Not Hiding You, Hiding Me"	0:58
12.	"Right Before You Say Those Words"	2:10
13.	"Who You Wanted Me to Be"	2:58
14.	"Far from Perfect"	1:41
15.	"Be with Me"	1:35
16.	"Christmas Morning (Deck the Halls / O Holy Night)"	3:40
Total length:		22:38

== Release ==
Happiest Season was released digitally in the United States on November 25, 2020, by Hulu. It was previously scheduled for a theatrical release on November 20, 2020, and later rescheduled to November 25, before it was purchased by Hulu due to the COVID-19 pandemic. Samba TV estimated that 416,680 U.S. households watched the film in its opening weekend, the best debut in Hulu's history.

The film was still distributed internationally by Sony Pictures Releasing International, under its TriStar Pictures label, while Entertainment One Films handled distribution in the United Kingdom and Canada. The film's original soundtrack was released on November 6, 2020, through Warner Records and features songs by Anne-Marie, Bebe Rexha, Shea Diamond, Sia, Brandy Clark, Carlie Hanson, and Tegan and Sara among others.

Happiest Season was released on Blu-Ray and DVD internationally by Sony Pictures Home Entertainment on March 3, 2021.

== Reception ==
On the review aggregator website Rotten Tomatoes, the film holds an approval rating of 82% based on 213 reviews, with an average rating of 6.8/10. The website's critics consensus reads, "A jolly good time with heartfelt performances and more than enough holiday cheer, all you'll want for Christmas is Happiest Season." On Metacritic, it has a weighted average score of 69 out of 100, based on 31 critics, indicating "generally favorable" reviews.

Leah Greenblatt of Entertainment Weekly gave the film a B+ and described it as "a smart, heartfelt comedy whose small flaws are easily blotted out by bigger charms." Reviewing the film for the Chicago Tribune, Michael Phillips gave it three out of four stars, saying that, despite his general distaste for movies revolving around a secret, "It works. It's built. And the people seem real, or at least reality-adjacent."

Several reviews named Mary Holland (who played Jane) as the film's breakout star.

Happiest Season won the 2021 GLAAD Media Award for Outstanding Film (Wide Release) and received Special Recognition for its soundtrack.

== Future ==
In December 2020, DuVall said, "I would love to do a sequel. I mean, I have a couple of ideas. We all had such a great time making the movie that we were talking about it then. But it was also just like, who knew if anybody would care about the movie or not? So I definitely am more than open to it." In May 2021, Holland said that the sequel is in "early stages". In April 2026, Plaza said that "there's some movements" for a sequel.

== See also ==
- List of Christmas films
