= I'm Ready (Sam Smith and Demi Lovato song) =

2020 single by Sam Smith and Demi Lovato

Single by Sam Smith and Demi Lovato
- Released: 16 April 2020
- Studio: MXM Studios; Los Angeles, California; MXM Studios; Stockholm, Sweden; BLND Studios; Sweden
- Genre: Pop; dance-pop
- Length: 3:20
- Label: Capitol
- Songwriters: Sam Smith; Demi Lovato; Ilya Salmanzadeh; Savan Kotecha; Peter Svensson
- Producer: Ilya

Sam Smith singles chronology
"To Die For" (2020)	"I'm Ready" (2020)	"My Oasis" (2020)

Demi Lovato singles chronology
"I Love Me" (2020)	"I'm Ready" (2020)	"OK Not to Be OK" (2020)

Music video
- "I'm Ready" on YouTube

"I'm Ready" is a song by the English singer Sam Smith and American singer Demi Lovato, released through Capitol Records on 16 April 2020. Smith and Lovato cowrote "I'm Ready" with Savan Kotecha, Peter Svensson, and the song's producer, Ilya Salmanzadeh. It reached the top 10 in Lebanon and the top 40 in the United States, United Kingdom, and 14 additional countries. The song appears on Smith's third studio album Love Goes (2020) and on the expanded edition of Lovato's seventh studio album Dancing with the Devil... the Art of Starting Over.

== Background and release ==
In an interview, Smith shared that they "grew up listening to" and "singing" Lovato's music, calling them an "incredible talent" and "everything [they stand] for as a human being". Thus, they revealed that they had been "training" for the moment to collaborate with Lovato for a long time. Smith also said that they had already been in contact as a friend to Lovato for years, and Lovato was invited to the studio by their mutual songwriter Savan Kotecha, which is what led to the collaboration happening.

On 9 April, Smith shared a polaroid of Smith and Lovato in the studio, captioned with "S + D 4 EVA". Smith also teased the duet on social media, tweeting "YOU READY" and tagging Lovato with a GIF that displays Smith and Lovato's initials; Lovato responded with "I'M READY". On 13 April, Smith and Lovato announced the title of the duet and its release date. During an interview with Popbuzz, Smith confirmed that "I'm Ready" was being released in promotion of their upcoming third album but might not appear on the final track listing.

== Composition ==
Described by Smith as "2020 ABBA", "I'm Ready" is considered a pop song with disco elements. The song features an "edgy" production and gospel choirs, with dark "sultry" verses and a "bass-y" chorus. Moreover, the song incorporates a fun, synth-pop flair with dynamic vocals. Lyrically, the duet is a "feel-good love song" about "having the bravery to be vulnerable and accepting of love" and strives to be an "anthemic musical declaration that both artists are ready to find love and, more importantly, to be loved by someone who appreciates them."

== Critical reception ==
"I'm Ready" received generally positive reviews from music critics. Raisa Bruner of Time deemed "I'm Ready" a "blazing new power anthem duet" and praised the "emotional showcase" of the two vocalists, saying that both "Smith and Lovato are on their game here". She also found that the elements of the song, including "an uplifting gospel chorus and a juicy bass section", makes for a "summer pop mash-up". Juddah Charles Lotter of MEAWW praised both the song and music video, saying "Sam Smith and Demi Lovato create magic in [the] Olympic-inspired beautifully infectious video". Lotter was particularly impressed by the vocal display in the last scene of the music video: "The final scene shows Lovato and Smith side-by-side atop a podium with some gymnasts performing nearby in a medal ceremony and the two belt out a rich simultaneous vocal performance with a choir providing the backing vocals". He went on to say that both Smith and Lovato "use their vocal gymnastics gorgeously with pitch-perfect singing and it almost feels like they kept fans waiting on the collab long enough just to see them burst into Olympic torch flame with excitement when they finally got the chance to hear it", as "they sound utterly amazing together". In 2023, Rolling Stone place the song at number 32 on its list of The 50 Most Inspirational LGBTQ Songs of All Time.

== Music video ==
=== Background and release ===
The music video was released on 17 April 2020. It was directed by Jora Frantzis, best known for her work on the 2019 music video for Cardi B's "Money". Smith shared in an interview with The Hot Press that queer inclusivity was a main factor when creating the setting and concept behind the music video: Smith recalls how they grew up queer and experiencing bullying in "the locker room with boys" at school, and thus being incessantly "scared of" and "triggered" by sports. Smith goes on to share that being able to have a "queer Olympics" in the music video was an "amazing" and "exciting" experience, and that it bought them joy, as they enjoyed "learning to wrestle in stilettos".

In the behind-the-scenes video released on 7 May 2020, director Jora Frantzis describes her thought process regarding the creation of the music video: she says "when I hear music that's as powerful and as big as this song is, I automatically envision motion and energy". As such, she wanted to do something that was "sports-related" but still tie it back to "what Smith represents", as Sam noted that for "the gay community, sports was always kind of a traumatizing experience in high school". She noted that "Sam thought it would be very empowering to kinda take over high school sports in the way that we did, almost like taking the power back." At the end of shooting the music video, Smith proclaimed to Lovato "I think we've actually made the gayest video of all time," to which Lovato laughed and agreed with a cheerful "Yes!"

Prior to the video's release, Smith and Lovato hopped on a video chat to reminisce about writing the song together. During this video chat, Smith and Lovato joked that the "I'm Ready" video is the "Queer Olympics" the world needs right now. "There was so much love in that place and so many beautiful people," Smith said about the video shoot, with Lovato agreeing, "Yes, beautiful people that were so talented."

=== Synopsis ===
The music video opens on Smith circling a man on the wrestling mat, as they sing about "waiting patiently for a beautiful lover" and vowing to "take that risk tonight" with someone new. As the instrumental approaches the bridge of the song, Smith lines up for a 100-meter sprint—they and their equally glam competitors dash off in sky-high stilettos, voluminous skirts, and impeccably applied makeup. These competitors include queer artists and drag queens Valentina, Gigi Goode, Dee TrannyBear, Alok Vaid-Menon, Shea Diamond and Jeffrey C. Williams.

The second verse of the song is taken over by Lovato; she holds court on a tall diving board, rocking a sophisticated black suit and appearing androgynous in style and mannerisms, as a queer all-male synchronized swim team near her on the diving board dive into the pool below her. Later on, Smith dances in high heels in their wrestling suit with their competitor wrestlers dancing alongside them. The choreography was coordinated by choreographer Sean Bankhead. Lovato and Smith eventually come together for the song's climax, which takes them to a gymnast-filled medal ceremony.

=== Critical reception ===
The Hot Press says that the music video "sees the cast redefine sports in beautiful, artistic, unapologetically queer ways." The way in which the "wrestlers and swimmers don sparkling, glittery outfits, corsets and sky-high stilettos", as well as the flow of the music video, in which "wrestling turns into dancing" and running "into a rainbow display", were elements that were particularly noted as impressive and empowering. Rory Gory and Shane Michael Singh from The Trevor Project applauded Smith for their dedication toward promoting and celebrating the LGBTQ community: "We actually have LGBTQ people behind the scenes, in front of the camera, creating the content themselves. That's when it feels really authentic and real," Gory said.

== Credits and personnel ==
=== Song ===
Credits adapted from Tidal.

- Sam Smith – songwriting, vocals, backing vocals
- Demi Lovato – songwriting, vocals
- Ilya – production, songwriting, bass guitar, drums, guitar, keyboards, percussion, programming
- Peter Svensson – songwriting
- Savan Kotecha – songwriting
- Wojtek Goral – alto saxophone
- David Bukovinszky – cello
- Johan Carlsson – piano
- Mattias Bylund – strings, string arrangement, choir arrangement, engineering
- Tomas Jonsson – tenor saxophone
- Peter Noos Johansson – trombone
- Janne Bjerger – trumpet
- Magnus Johansson – trumpet
- Anneli Axon – background vocals
- Johanna S Jonasson – background vocals
- Anna Bylund – background vocals
- Mattias Johansson – violin
- John Hanes – engineering, studio personnel
- Sam Holland – engineering, studio personnel
- Serban Ghenea – mixing, studio personnel
- Randy Merrill – mastering, studio personnel

=== Music video ===
Credits adapted from YouTube.

- Jora Frantzis – director
- PRETTYBIRD – producer
- Kevin Kloecker – video commissioner
- Candice Dragonas – VP / executive producer
- Chris Clavadetscher – executive producer
- Rob Witt – director of photography
- Sean Bankhead – choreographer
- Rika Osenberg – head of production
- Autumn Hymes – line producer
- Kenia Gutierrez – production supervisor
- Adam Winder – stylist (Sam Smith)
- Sienree Du – hair and makeup (Sam Smith)
- Siena Montesano – stylist (Demi Lovato)
- Paul Norton – hair (Demi Lovato)
- Rokael Lizama – makeup (Demi Lovato)

== Charts ==
Chart performance of "I'm Ready"
Chart (2020)	Peak position
Australia (ARIA)	25
Austria (Ö3 Austria Top 40)	56
Belgium (Ultratip Bubbling Under Flanders)	3
Belgium (Ultratip Bubbling Under Wallonia)	11
Canada Hot 100 (Billboard)	30
Canada CHR/Top 40 (Billboard)	25
Canada Hot AC (Billboard)	35
Croatia (HRT)	25
Czech Republic Singles Digital (ČNS IFPI)	50
Estonia (Eesti Tipp-40)	39
Euro Digital Song Sales (Billboard)	9
France (SNEP)	196
Germany (GfK)	66
Greece International (IFPI)	38
Hungary (Rádiós Top 40)	34
Hungary (Stream Top 40)	27
Ireland (IRMA)	13
Italy (FIMI)	70
Lebanon (OLT20)	6
Japan Hot Overseas (Billboard)	12
Lithuania (AGATA)	30
Mexico Airplay (Billboard)	37
Netherlands (Dutch Top 40)	19
Netherlands (Single Top 100)	48
New Zealand (Recorded Music NZ)	28
Norway (VG-lista)	31
Portugal (AFP)	36
Scottish Singles Sales (Official Charts)	11
Singapore (RIAS)	30
Slovakia Singles Digital (ČNS IFPI)	40
Sweden (Sverigetopplistan)	34
Switzerland (Schweizer Hitparade)	35
UK Singles (Official Charts)	20
US Billboard Hot 100	36
US Adult Pop Airplay (Billboard)	36
US Dance Airplay (Billboard)	35
US Pop Airplay (Billboard)	24

== Certifications ==
Region	Certification	Certified units/sales
Australia (ARIA)	Platinum	70,000^{‡}
Brazil (Pro-Música Brasil)	2× Platinum	80,000^{‡}
Canada (Music Canada)	Gold	40,000^{‡}
New Zealand (RMNZ)	Gold	15,000^{‡}
United Kingdom (BPI)	Silver	200,000^{‡}
United States (RIAA)	Gold	500,000^{‡}
^{‡} Sales+streaming figures based on certification alone.

== Release history ==
Release formats for "I'm Ready"
Region	Date	Format	Label	Ref.
Various	16 April 2020	Digital download; streaming	Capitol	
Italy	17 April 2020	Contemporary hit radio	Universal	
United Kingdom	17 April 2020	Contemporary hit radio	Capitol	
United Kingdom	17 April 2020	Adult contemporary radio	Capitol	
Australia	17 April 2020	Contemporary hit radio	Capitol	
