= Kids Again (Sam Smith song) =

2020 song by Sam Smith

Single by Sam Smith

from the album Love Goes
- Released: 30 October 2020
- Studio: Gold Tooth Music; Beverly Hills, California
- Genre: Soft rock
- Length: 3:27
- Songwriters: Sam Smith; Ryan Tedder; Ali Tamposi; Andrew Wotman; Louis Bell
- Producers: Andrew Watt; Louis Bell

Sam Smith singles chronology
"Diamonds" (2020)	"Kids Again" (2020)	"The Lighthouse Keeper" (2020)

Music video
- "Kids Again" on YouTube

"Kids Again" is a song by the English singer Sam Smith, released through Capitol Records on 30 October 2020 as the third and final single from their third studio album, Love Goes (2020). The song was written by Sam Smith, Ryan Tedder, Ali Tamposi, Andrew Wotman and Louis Bell.

== Music video ==
The music video, directed by Alasdair McLellan, premiered on YouTube on 30 October 2020.

== Composition ==
When Sam Smith was interviewed by Clara Amfo for BBC Sounds both remarked that there are echoes of 1970s and 1980s music, particularly the work of Fleetwood Mac in this track. It is, Sam commented, different in style to anything else on the album.

Sam added that "this is a bridge to my next record", expressing the intention to move on from the style of Love Goes to involve themself more in the intricacies of production and "rootsy queer soul".

== Personnel ==
- Andrew Watt – producer, composer, associated performer, background vocalist, bass guitar, drums, guitar, percussion
- Louis Bell – producer, composer, associated performer, keyboards, programming
- Ali Tamposi – composer, lyricist, associated performer, background vocalist
- Ryan Tedder – composer, associated performer, background vocalist, keyboards
- Sam Smith – composer, lyricist, associated performer, vocals
- Chris Bolster – immersive mix engineer
- Randy Merrill – mastering engineer, studio personnel
- Mark Stent – mixer, studio personnel

== Charts ==
Chart performance for "Kids Again"
Chart (2020)	Peak position
Global 200 (Billboard)	155
Ireland (IRMA)	73
New Zealand Hot Singles (RMNZ)	10
Portugal (AFP)	198
Sweden Heatseeker (Sverigetopplistan)	14
UK Singles (Official Charts)	89

== Certifications ==
Certifications for "Kids Again"
Region	Certification	Certified units/sales
Brazil (Pro-Música Brasil)	Gold	20,000^{‡}
^{‡} Sales+streaming figures based on certification alone.

== Release history ==
Release history and formats for "Kids Again"
Region	Date	Format	Label
United Kingdom	30 October 2020	Digital download; streaming	Capitol
