= Mama Gloria =

- Official movie poster
- Directed by: Luchina Fisher
- Written by: Luchina Fisher
- Produced by: Luchina Fisher; Yvonne Welbon; Zainab Ali
- Starring: Gloria Allen
- Cinematography: Stephen J. Lewis
- Edited by: Caroline Berler
- Music by: Jocelyn Chambers
- Production companies: Black Public Media; Little Light Productions; Sisters in Cinema; SouthPaw Video Productions
- Release date: 14 October 2020 (Chicago International Film Festival)
- Running time: 76 minutes
- Country: United States
- Language: English

Mama Gloria is an American documentary film directed by Luchina Fisher. The film tells the life story of Gloria Allen, a septuagenarian trans woman from the south side of Chicago. Mama Gloria premiered in October 2020 at the Chicago International Film Festival. The film received awards from the Teaneck International Film Festival and the Milwaukee Film Festival.

== Plot ==
Mama Gloria centers Gloria Allen, a 73-year-old trans woman based in Chicago, Illinois. The film shares her life and recollections of growing up on the south side with an extremely supportive family, her childhood realization that she was a girl, time spent in the drag ball scene, her eventual coming out and gender reassignment surgery, and her later career as the proprietor of a charm school.

== Production ==
Mama Gloria is director and writer Luchina Fisher's debut documentary feature. She developed Mama Gloria so her own daughter, teenage trans advocate Gia Parr, would have a story about a Black trans woman role model that didn't focus solely on their vulnerability to violence. The idea originated from her friend E. Patrick Johnson, who shared a Chicago Tribune profile of Allen and suggested Fisher produce a documentary. The title is taken from the nickname by which Allen is known.

Fisher co-produced the film with Yvonne Welbon, Zainab Ali, and Lorna Grisby. The majority of the crew were members of the Black LGBTQ community.

Filming began in 2018. Although production was shut down at the onset of the COVID-19 pandemic, Fisher had enough footage by that time for a complete story.

Of the production, Allen stated in an interview in the Chicago Tribune, "“It’s just like a dream for me...Everything turned out to be so good and I’m so grateful and thankful to her."

The soundtrack includes "Presence of a Legend," an original song by trans singer-songerwriter Shea Diamond.

== Release ==
Mama Gloria premiered at the Chicago International Film Festival in October 2020 and later showed at several other festivals. It was released as a part of the World Channel documentary series AfroPoP: The Ultimate Cultural Exchange on April 5, 2021.

Licensing rights to the film were acquired by PBS for release in 2021.

== Reception ==
The film received positive reception. In a positive review for Scalawag, Antonia Randolph wrote, "Rather than offering a litany of the trauma that Black trans women endure, we see how anti-trans violence may have haunted Mama Gloria's life, but does not define it. The film's poignancy comes from contrasting the victories and disappointments that make up any life with a portrayal of the unique forces that subject Black transgender women to premature death." NBC News's Derrick Clifton described Allen's story as "one of surviving with grace and dignity, and a model of possibility for trans people when they are loved and affirmed by their families." Kathleen Sachs of the Chicago Reader described it as a "love letter to the charismatic activist" and noted that "it’s refreshing to watch something about love within this community—especially Allen’s love for herself."

== Awards and nominations ==
- 2020 – Chicago International Film Festival – Best Documentary, Nominee
- 2020 – Teaneck International Film Festival – Best Documentary, Winner
- 2020 – CineOdyssey Film Festival – Best of Fest
- 2021 – Milwaukee Film Festival, Black Lens Jury Award, Winner
