= To Die For (Sam Smith song) =

2020 single by Sam Smith

- "To Die For" was released as an instant download for album pre-orders. When the album was renamed, a new cover was released for the album.

Single by Sam Smith

from the album Love Goes
- Released: 14 February 2020
- Studio: The Stellar House (Venice, Los Angeles)
- Genre: Pop
- Length: 3:13
- Label: Capitol
- Songwriters: Samuel Smith; James Napier; Tor Erik Hermansen; Mikkel Storleer Eriksen
- Producers: Stargate; Jimmy Napes

Sam Smith singles chronology
"I Feel Love" (2019)	"To Die For" (2020)	"I'm Ready" (2020)

Alternate cover
- Acoustic version cover

Music video
- "To Die For" on YouTube

"To Die For" is a song by the English singer Sam Smith, released through Capitol Records on 14 February 2020. Smith co-wrote the song alongside Jimmy Napes and Stargate. The song appears on Smith's third studio album Love Goes (2020).

== Background ==
Smith said that they wrote the song in Los Angeles "during a time of self-discovery and heartbreak".

== Composition ==
"To Die For", a pop song, was written by Smith, Jimmy Napes, Stargate, and produced by the latter two. Running for a length of three minutes and thirteen seconds, "To Die For" is a piano-forward ballad. The song includes lines from the 2001 cult classic film Donnie Darko. To minimize legal and financial issues, the song does not feature a direct sample from the film, but rather re-recorded dialogue, including from lead actor Jake Gyllenhaal.

== Promotion ==
Smith opened a pop-up wig shop named after the song in the Soho area of London, and performed the song on The Graham Norton Show on 14 February.

== Music video ==
The music video, directed by Grant Singer, premiered on YouTube on 13 February 2020.

== Track listing ==
Digital download/stream

1. "To Die For" – 3:14

Digital download/stream

1. "To Die For" (Acoustic) – 3:20

Digital download – Remixes EP

1. "To Die For" (Ólafur Arnalds Remix) – 3:30
2. "To Die For" (Y2K Remix) – 2:25
3. "To Die For" (Blinkie Remix) – 3:32
4. "To Die For" (Madism Remix) – 2:42

Stream – Y2K remix

1. "To Die For" (Y2K Remix) – 2:26

Stream – Madism Remix

1. "To Die For" (Madism Remix) – 2:42

Stream – Blinkie Remix

1. "To Die For" (Blinkie Remix) – 3:33

Stream – Ólafur Arnalds Remix

1. "To Die For" (Ólafur Arnalds Remix) – 3:30

== Credits and personnel ==
Credits adapted from Tidal.

- Jimmy Napes – songwriter, producer
- Stargate – songwriter, producer
- Sam Smith – songwriter, vocals
- Mikkel S. Eriksen – programming
- Kevin KD Davis – mixer, studio personnel
- Randy Merrill – mastering engineer, studio personnel

== Charts ==
=== Weekly charts ===
Chart (2020)	Peak position
Australia (ARIA)	15
Belgium (Ultratop 50 Flanders)	41
Belgium (Ultratop 50 Wallonia)	14
Canada Hot 100 (Billboard)	56
Canada CHR/Top 40 (Billboard)	39
Canada Hot AC (Billboard)	39
Croatia (HRT)	31
Czech Republic Singles Digital (ČNS IFPI)	64
Estonia (Eesti Tipp-40)	33
Euro Digital Song Sales (Billboard)	11
Germany (GfK)	90
Ireland (IRMA)	21
Lebanon (OLT20)	15
Malaysia (RIM)	20
Mexico Ingles Airplay (Billboard)	8
Netherlands (Dutch Top 40)	27
Netherlands (Single Top 100)	75
New Zealand (Recorded Music NZ)	34
Norway (VG-lista)	34
Portugal (AFP)	90
Scottish Singles Sales (Official Charts)	6
Singapore (RIAS)	18
Slovakia Singles Digital (ČNS IFPI)	52
South Korea (Gaon)	39
Sweden (Sverigetopplistan)	51
Switzerland (Schweizer Hitparade)	42
UK Singles (Official Charts)	18
US Billboard Hot 100	46
US Adult Contemporary (Billboard)	17
US Adult Pop Airplay (Billboard)	20
US Pop Airplay (Billboard)	23
US Rolling Stone Top 100	30

=== Year-end charts ===
Chart (2020)	Position
Belgium (Ultratop Wallonia)	84

Chart (2021)	Position
South Korea (Gaon)	199

== Certifications ==
Region	Certification	Certified units/sales
Australia (ARIA)	2× Platinum	140,000^{‡}
Brazil (Pro-Música Brasil)	Platinum	40,000^{‡}
Canada (Music Canada)	Platinum	80,000^{‡}
Denmark (IFPI Danmark)	Gold	45,000^{‡}
Mexico (AMPROFON)	Gold	30,000^{‡}
New Zealand (RMNZ)	Platinum	30,000^{‡}
Norway (IFPI Norway)	Gold	30,000^{‡}
Portugal (AFP)	Gold	5,000^{‡}
United Kingdom (BPI)	Gold	400,000^{‡}
United States (RIAA)	Gold	500,000^{‡}
Streaming
Sweden (GLF)	Gold	4,000,000^{†}
^{‡} Sales+streaming figures based on certification alone.^{†} Streaming-only figures based on certification alone.

== Release history ==
Region	Date	Format	Version	Label	Ref.
Various	14 February 2020	Digital download; streaming	Single version	Capitol	
Australia	14 February 2020	Contemporary hit radio	Single version	Capitol	
Italy	14 February 2020	Contemporary hit radio	Single version	Universal	
United Kingdom	14 February 2020	Contemporary hit radio	Single version	Capitol	
United Kingdom	14 February 2020	Adult contemporary radio	Single version	Capitol	
United States	17 February 2020	Hot/Modern/AC radio	Single version	Capitol	
United States	18 February 2020	Contemporary hit radio	Single version	Capitol	
Various	6 March 2020	Digital Download	Remixes EP	Capitol	
Various	6 March 2020	Streaming	Y2K remix	Capitol	
Various	6 March 2020	Streaming	Madism remix	Capitol	
Various	6 March 2020	Streaming	Blinkie remix	Capitol	
Various	6 March 2020	Streaming	Ólafur Arnalds remix	Capitol	
Various	13 March 2020	Digital download; streaming	Acoustic single	Capitol	
