= My Oasis =

2020 single by Sam Smith featuring Burna Boy

Single by Sam Smith featuring Burna Boy

from the album Love Goes
- Released: 30 July 2020
- Studio: London Lane (London, England)
- Genre: Tropical house; Afrobeats
- Length: 2:59
- Label: Capitol
- Songwriters: Jimmy Napes; Sam Smith; Burna Boy
- Producers: Jimmy Napes; Ilya

Sam Smith singles chronology
| "I'm Ready" (2020) | "My Oasis" (2020) | "Temptation" (2020) |

Burna Boy singles chronology
| "Wonderful" (2020) | "My Oasis" (2020) | "20 10 20" (2020) |

Lyric video
- "My Oasis" on YouTube

"My Oasis" is a song by the English singer Sam Smith featuring vocals by the Nigerian singer Burna Boy. It was released through Capitol Records on 30 July 2020 as the lead single from Smith's third studio album Love Goes (2020). The song was written by Jimmy Napes, Sam Smith and Burna Boy. Burna Boy's production includes elements of Afrobeats.

== Background ==
The song received its official first play on BBC Radio 1's Annie Mac Show. Talking about the song, Sam Smith said, "This track has been a beautiful release of emotions for me during this time. I've been a fan of Burna Boy for years now and so happy to have a tune with him."

== Personnel ==
Credits adapted from Tidal.

- Ilya – producer, associated performer, keyboards, percussion, programming, vocal producer
- Jimmy Napes – producer, composer, lyricist, associated performer, bass guitar, programming, synthesizer
- Damini Ogulu – composer, lyricist, associated performer, featured artist, vocals
- Sam Smith – composer, lyricist, associated performer, vocals
- Ben Jones – acoustic guitar, associated performer, electric guitar
- Darren Heelis – additional Juno Bass played and recorded
- Randy Merrill – mastering engineer, studio personnel
- Steve Fitzmaurice – mixer, studio personnel

== Charts ==
| Chart (2020) | Peak position |
|---|---|
| Australia (ARIA) | 84 |
| Belgium (Ultratip Bubbling Under Wallonia) | 2 |
| Canada Hot 100 (Billboard) | 70 |
| Croatia (HRT) | 73 |
| Hungary (Single Top 40) | 39 |
| Ireland (IRMA) | 43 |
| Netherlands (Single Tip) | 8 |
| New Zealand Hot Singles (RMNZ) | 5 |
| Portugal (AFP) | 140 |
| Scottish Singles Sales (Official Charts) | 75 |
| Suriname (Nationale Top 40) | 2 |
| Sweden Heatseeker (Sverigetopplistan) | 1 |
| Switzerland (Schweizer Hitparade) | 52 |
| UK Singles (Official Charts) | 43 |
| US Bubbling Under Hot 100 (Billboard) | 12 |
| US Rolling Stone Top 100 | 99 |

== Certifications ==
Certifications for "My Oasis"
| Region | Certification | Certified units/sales |
|---|---|---|
| Australia (ARIA) | Gold | 35,000^{‡} |
| Brazil (Pro-Música Brasil) | Platinum | 40,000^{‡} |
| Canada (Music Canada) | Gold | 40,000^{‡} |
| United Kingdom (BPI) | Silver | 200,000^{‡} |
^{‡} Sales+streaming figures based on certification alone.

== Release history ==
| Region | Date | Format | Label | Ref. |
|---|---|---|---|---|
| Various | 30 July 2020 | Digital download; streaming | Capitol | |
| Australia | 30 July 2020 | Contemporary hit radio | Capitol; EMI | |
