= Shea Diamond =

American singer, songwriter and transgender rights activist

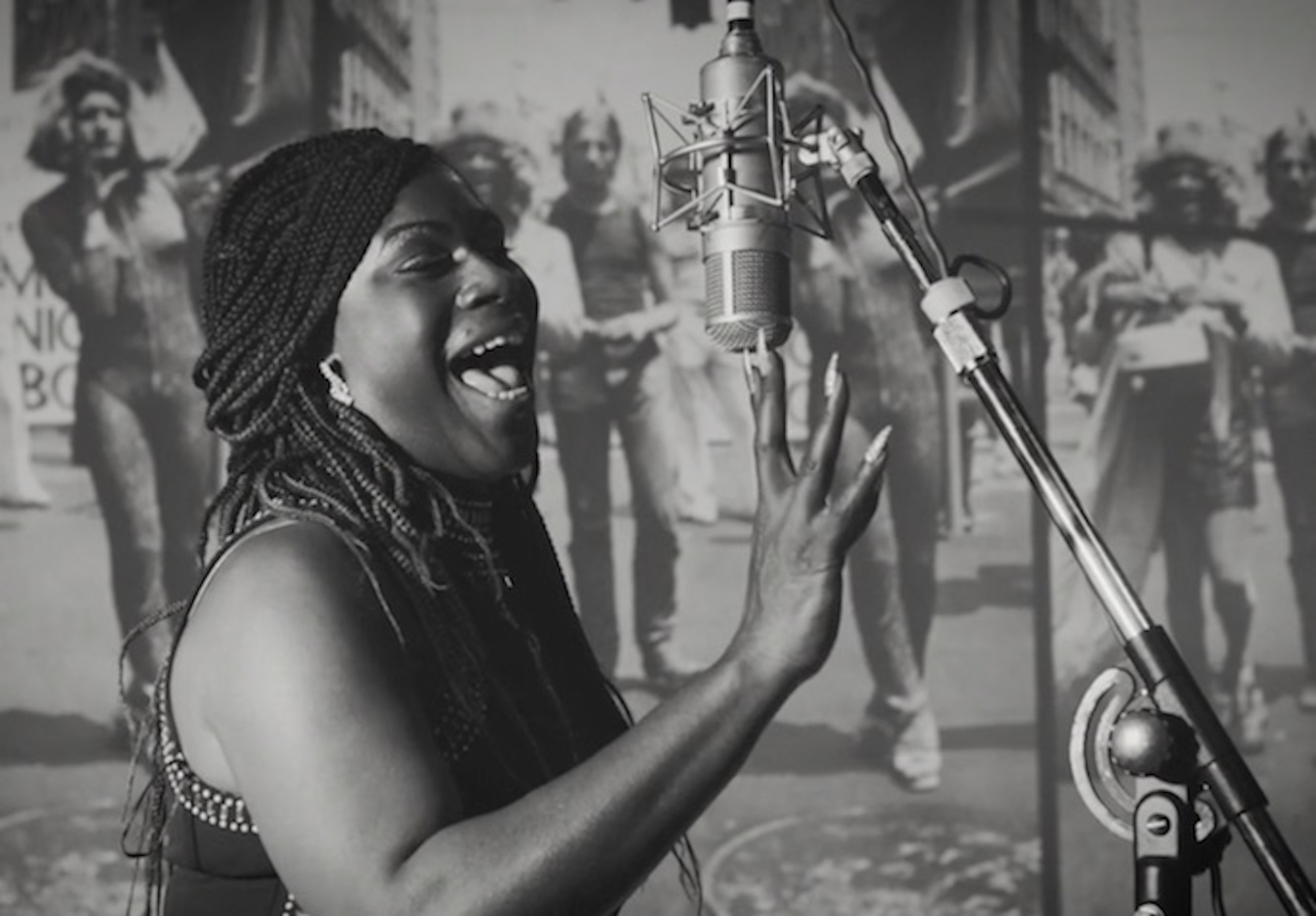

Background information
- Born: ShaGasyia Diamond; 17 March 1978 (age 48); Little Rock, Arkansas
- Genres: Soul; R&B
- Instrument: Vocals
- Labels: Asylum; East West; Facet

ShaGasyia "Shea" Diamond (born March 17, 1978) is an American singer, songwriter, and transgender rights activist. Her music is chiefly soul and R&B, and includes elements of blues, rock, hip-hop and folk. Her debut extended play Seen It All was released on June 29, 2018.

== Early life ==
Diamond was born in Little Rock, Arkansas to a fourteen-year-old mother and was raised by relatives in Memphis, Tennessee, before living most of her teenage years and adulthood in Flint, Michigan. She ran away from home at age fourteen and spent time in the foster care system before getting emancipated at seventeen. Growing up, she felt immense pressure to act masculine, despite knowing early on that she identified as a woman. She was inspired to become a singer by Tina Turner and worked on her skills while directing her church choir, where she was often chastised for singing too high.

At age 20, she robbed a convenience store at gunpoint to pay for gender affirmation surgery. Diamond was in and out of men's correctional facilities in Michigan between 1999 and 2009. While in prison, she wrote the song "I Am Her." While incarcerated, Diamond faced discrimination specifically for her identity as a trans woman. She was kept in protective segregation and lost privileges often to keep her away from the male population. Humiliation, isolation, and misgendering were used as punishment.

== Career ==
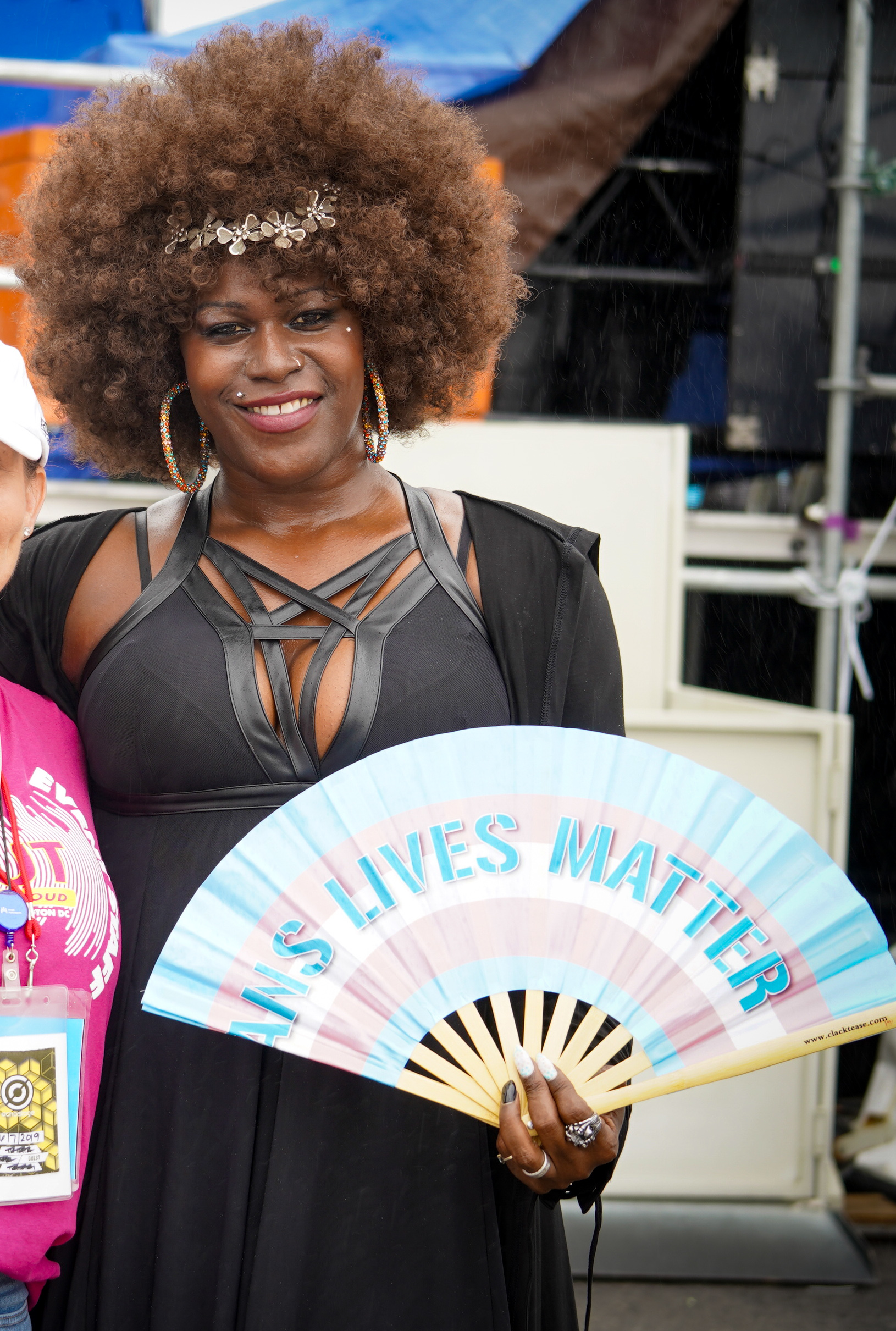
Diamond at Capital Pride in 2019 in Washington, DC

After watching a video of Diamond performing her song "I Am Her" a cappella at a Trans Lives Matter rally, pop songwriter Justin Tranter contacted her and they began recording music together. Tranter co-signed her to Asylum Records and executive produced and co-wrote her debut extended play Seen It All, released on June 29, 2018.

In 2017, Diamond covered "I'd Love to Change the World" by the English rock band Ten Years After for the television miniseries When We Rise. In December 2018, Diamond joined the Human Rights Campaign's Equality Rocks campaign.

In February 2019, she was nominated for the GLAAD Media Award for Outstanding Music Artist. The same year her song "American Pie" was endorsed by 2020 United States presidential candidate Pete Buttigieg and used in his campaign rallies. In June 2019, she was a headliner for the Washington, DC Capital Pride Concert. On June 7, 2019, Diamond released her single "Don't Shoot", a song that was described by Paper as containing "a message against America's ongoing gun violence epidemic while also being a reflection Diamond's experience [sic] as a Black trans woman who has been incarcerated and systemically discriminated against".

Diamond's hand appeared on the original cover of Sam Smith's third studio album, when it was known as To Die For. She also appears in the music video for their song "I'm Ready" with Demi Lovato.

Diamond's song "I Am America" is the theme song for the HBO series We're Here. The song was released as a single on April 23, 2020. "I Am America" was included on Billboard's list of the best LGBTQ songs of 2020. Also in 2020, she released the singles "Stand Up" and "So Lucky", and had two songs appear on the soundtrack to the Hulu original Christmas film Happiest Season.

== Artistry ==
Diamond's songwriting ability has been described as "demonstrating a rare gift to portray raw, dynamic emotion in a way that moves the body as much as the spirit". Her influences include Whitney Houston and Tina Turner.

== Discography ==
Shea Diamond discography
- EPs: 2
- Singles: 11

=== Extended plays ===
Title	Album details
Seen It All	Released: June 29, 2018; Label: Asylum, East West; Format: Digital download, streaming
Memory Lane	Released: September 22, 2023; Label: Facet; Format: Digital download, streaming

=== Singles ===
==== As lead artist ====
Title	Year	Album
"I Am Her"	2017	Seen It All
"Keisha Complexion"	2018	Seen It All
"American Pie"	2018	Seen It All
"Don't Shoot"	2019	Non-album singles
"I Am America" (from We're Here)	2020	Non-album singles
"Stand Up" (with Tom Morello and Dan Reynolds featuring The Bloody Beetroots)	2020	Non-album singles
"So Lucky"	2020	Non-album singles
"Presence of a Legend" (from Mama Gloria)	2021	Non-album singles
"Smile"	2021	Non-album singles
"People Get Ready"	2023	Memory Lane
"Summertime"	2023	Memory Lane

==== As featured artist ====
Title	Year	Album
"Chasing Dreams" (from Hulu's Changing the Game) (Gozé featuring Old Man Saxon and Shea Diamond)	2021	Non-albums single

=== Other appearances ===
Title	Year	Other artist(s)	Album
"I'd Love to Change the World"	2017	—N/a	When We Rise (Original Television Soundtrack)
"Movies About Women Written By Men"	2019	Jed Davis	Rise and Shine: Day 1
"Saratoga"	2019	Jed Davis	Rise and Shine: Day 1
"Thank You"	2019	Sam Barsh	The Nine
"Blame It on Christmas"	2020	Bebe Rexha	Happiest Season (Original Motion Picture Soundtrack)
"Mrs. Claus"	2020	—N/a	Happiest Season (Original Motion Picture Soundtrack)
