= Diamonds (Sam Smith song) =

Single by Sam Smith

from the album Love Goes
- Released: 18 September 2020
- Studio: RAK (London); House Mouse and Do a Little Dance (Stockholm, Sweden)
- Genre: Disco • dance pop
- Length: 3:32
- Label: Capitol
- Songwriters: Sam Smith; Karl Schuster; Oscar Görres
- Producers: Shellback; Oscar Görres

Sam Smith singles chronology
"Temptation" (2020)	"Diamonds" (2020)	"Kids Again" (2020)

Music video
- "Diamonds" on YouTube

"Diamonds" is a song by the English singer Sam Smith, released through Capitol Records on 18 September 2020 as the second single from their third studio album, Love Goes (2020). The song was written by Smith with its producers Shellback and Oscar Görres. A remix of the song by English DJ Joel Corry and an acoustic version were released on 9 October 2020.

== Composition and reception ==
"Diamonds" is a breakup song that sees Smith "snarl[ing] like Gloria Gaynor in divorce court". Samantha Hissong of Rolling Stone called the song "three minutes and 34 seconds of catharsis."

== Track listing ==
Digital download - Acoustic

1. "Diamonds" (Acoustic) – 3:14

Digital download - Joel Corry Remix

1. "Diamonds" (Joel Corry Remix) – 3:15

== Credits and personnel ==
Credits adapted from Smith's official website.

- Sam Smith – vocals, songwriter
- Shellback – songwriter, producer, programming, drums, guitar, bass and epic triangle
- Oscar Görres – songwriter, producer, programming, piano, keys and guitar
- Serban Ghenea – mixing
- John Hanes – engineer
- Duncan Fuller – assistant engineer
- Randy Merrill – mastering

== Charts ==
=== Weekly charts ===
Chart (2020–2023)	Peak position
Argentina Hot 100 (Billboard)	71
Australia (ARIA)	33
Belarus Airplay (TopHit)	79
Belgium (Ultratop 50 Flanders)	18
Belgium (Ultratop 50 Wallonia)	26
Canada Hot 100 (Billboard)	19
Canada AC (Billboard)	4
Canada CHR/Top 40 (Billboard)	6
Canada Hot AC (Billboard)	4
CIS Airplay (TopHit)	5
Czech Republic Airplay (ČNS IFPI)	8
Estonia Airplay (TopHit)	110
Euro Digital Song Sales (Billboard)	4
France (SNEP)	89
Germany (GfK)	69
Germany Airplay (BVMI)	1
Global 200 (Billboard)	32
Greece International (IFPI)	47
Hungary (Rádiós Top 40)	2
Hungary (Single Top 40)	6
Iceland (Tónlistinn)	15
Ireland (IRMA)	19
Italy (FIMI)	67
Kazakhstan Airplay (TopHit)	62
Lebanon Airplay (Lebanese Top 20)	19
Lithuania (AGATA)	26
Mexico Airplay (Billboard)	10
Netherlands (Dutch Top 40)	25
Netherlands (Single Top 100)	44
New Zealand (Recorded Music NZ)	39
Poland Airplay (ZPAV)	2
Portugal (AFP)	66
Portugal Airplay (AFP)	4
Romania (Airplay 100)	19
Russia Airplay (TopHit)	6
San Marino Airplay (SMRTV Top 50)	15
Scottish Singles Sales (Official Charts)	3
Singapore (RIAS)	24
Slovakia Airplay (ČNS IFPI)	13
Sweden (Sverigetopplistan)	71
Switzerland (Schweizer Hitparade)	31
Ukraine Airplay (TopHit)	87
UK Singles (Official Charts)	11
US Billboard Hot 100	39
US Adult Contemporary (Billboard)	11
US Adult Pop Airplay (Billboard)	8
US Dance Airplay (Billboard)	1
US Pop Airplay (Billboard)	11

2025 weekly chart performance for "Diamonds"
Chart (2025)	Peak position
Belarus Airplay (TopHit)	82

=== Monthly charts ===
Monthly chart performance for "Diamonds"
Chart (2023)	Peak position
Belarus Airplay (TopHit)	95

=== Year-end charts ===
Chart (2020)	Position
CIS (TopHit)	82
Poland (Polish Airplay Top 100)	68
Russia Airplay (TopHit)	91

Chart (2021)	Position
Canada (Canadian Hot 100)	57
CIS (TopHit)	22
Hungary (Rádiós Top 40)	24
Poland (ZPAV)	88
Russia Airplay (TopHit)	26
US Adult Contemporary (Billboard)	25
US Adult Top 40 (Billboard)	33
US Mainstream Top 40 (Billboard)	49

Chart (2022)	Position
Hungary (Rádiós Top 40)	29

Year-end chart performance
Chart (2023)	Position
Belarus Airplay (TopHit)	124

Year-end chart performance
Chart (2025)	Position
Belarus Airplay (TopHit)	126

== Certifications ==
Region	Certification	Certified units/sales
Australia (ARIA)	2× Platinum	140,000^{‡}
Austria (IFPI Austria)	Gold	15,000^{‡}
Brazil (Pro-Música Brasil)	Diamond	160,000^{‡}
Canada (Music Canada)	2× Platinum	160,000^{‡}
Denmark (IFPI Danmark)	Gold	45,000^{‡}
France (SNEP)	Platinum	200,000^{‡}
Italy (FIMI)	Platinum	70,000^{‡}
New Zealand (RMNZ)	Platinum	30,000^{‡}
Norway (IFPI Norway)	Gold	30,000^{‡}
Poland (ZPAV)	Platinum	50,000^{‡}
Spain (Promusicae)	Platinum	60,000^{‡}
United Kingdom (BPI)	Platinum	600,000^{‡}
United States (RIAA)	Platinum	1,000,000^{‡}
^{‡} Sales+streaming figures based on certification alone.

== Release history ==
Region	Date	Format	Version	Label	Ref.
Various	18 September 2020	Digital download; streaming	Original	Capitol	
Various	9 October 2020	Digital download; streaming	Acoustic	Capitol	
Various	9 October 2020	Digital download; streaming	Joel Corry Remix	Capitol	
United States	21 September 2020	Hot adult contemporary radio	Original	Capitol	

== See also ==
- List of Billboard number-one dance songs of 2020
