= Teaneck International Film Festival =

Annual Film Festival in Teaneck, New Jersey

The Teaneck International Film Festival (TIFF) is juried film completion and festival that takes place annually in Teaneck, New Jersey. It is a project of the Puffin Foundation, a non-profit organization which promotes social change through creativity.

The film festival was started in 2006 and has the recurring theme "Activism: Making Change". TIFF features both American and international feature-length films, documentaries and shorts which highlight current social issues. The Star-Ledger, New Jersey's largest newspaper, called TIFF "the film festival with a social conscience". Teaneck Cinemas hosts the festival, with showings at other local venues.

Among the films that have won awards at the festival are Neshoba (2008), Stones in the Sun (2012), Bathtubs Over Broadway, (2018), and Mama Gloria (2020).

== See also ==
- Northeast Film Festival, which also takes place in Teaneck
- List of film festivals in New Jersey
- List of film festivals in the United States
- Television and film in New Jersey
