= Watership Down (2018 TV series) =

2018 UK animated television TV series

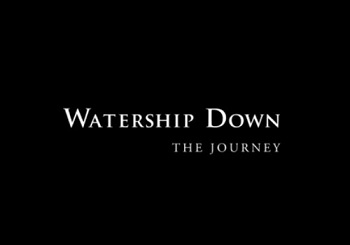
- Title screen for the first episode
- Genre: Action; Adventure; Fantasy; Drama
- Based on: Watership Down by Richard Adams
- Written by: Tom Bidwell
- Directed by: Noam Murro
- Starring: James McAvoy; Nicholas Hoult; John Boyega; Ben Kingsley; Tom Wilkinson; Gemma Arterton; Peter Capaldi; Olivia Colman; Mackenzie Crook
- Music by: Federico Jusid
- Opening theme: "Fire on Fire" (written and performed by Sam Smith)
- Ending theme: "Fire on Fire" (written and performed by Sam Smith)
- Countries of origin: United Kingdom; Ireland; United States
- Original language: English
- No. of episodes: 4

Production
- Executive producers: Rory Aitken; Ben Irving; Eleanor Moran; Noam Murro; Ben Pugh; Matthew Read; Martin Rosen; Josh Varney; Ricardo Curtis; Wes Lui; Ted Biaselli; Larry Tanz
- Producers: Georgia Dussaud; Cecil Kramer
- Editor: Andrew Walton
- Running time: 50–51 minutes
- Production companies: 42; Biscuit Filmworks; Brown Bag Films; BBC; Netflix
- Budget: £20 million

Original release
- Network: BBC One (United Kingdom); Netflix (international)
- Release: 22 December – 23 December 2018

Watership Down is a CGI-animated adventure fantasy drama television programme directed by Noam Murro. It is based on the 1972 novel of the same name by Richard Adams and adapted by Tom Bidwell. It was released on 22 December 2018 in the United Kingdom and internationally on Netflix the next day. The BBC broadcast comprised two back-to-back episodes per day.

The music video for "Fire on Fire" (from Watership Down) by Sam Smith was released on 21 December 2018.

== Voice cast ==
- James McAvoy as Hazel
- Nicholas Hoult as Fiver
- John Boyega as Bigwig
- Ben Kingsley as General Woundwort
- Tom Wilkinson as Threarah
- Gemma Arterton as Clover
- Peter Capaldi as Kehaar
- Olivia Colman as Strawberry
- Mackenzie Crook as Hawkbit
- Anne-Marie Duff as Hyzenthlay
- Taron Egerton as El-Ahrairah
- Freddie Fox as Captain Holly
- James Faulkner as Frith
- Lee Ingleby as Campion
- Miles Jupp as Blackberry
- Daniel Kaluuya as Bluebell
- Rory Kinnear as Cowslip
- Craig Parkinson as Sergeant Sainfoin
- Rosamund Pike as the Black Rabbit of Inlé
- Daniel Rigby as Dandelion
- Jason Watkins as Captain Orchis
- Adewale Akinnuoye-Agbaje as Vervain
- Gemma Chan as Dewdrop
- Rosie Day as Thethuthinnang
- Emeli Sande as Thethuthinang Singing Voice
- Henry Goodman as Blackavar
- Peter Guinness as Silverweed
- Charlotte Spencer as Nettle

== Production ==
In July 2014, it was announced that the BBC would be airing a new animated serial of Watership Down based on the 1972 novel and the 1978 film. In April 2016, it was announced that the series would be a co-production between BBC and Netflix, and would consist of four one hour episodes. The series has a budget of £20 million. The rest of the voice cast was announced in November 2018.

== Release ==
Originally set for release on 25 December 2018, Watership Down was released on 22 December 2018, on BBC One in the UK and on 23 December 2018 on Netflix, internationally. In Germany, the series was released on DVD in Region 2, despite not being released in the UK.

== Episodes ==
No.	Title	Directed by	Written by	Original release date	UK viewers (millions)
1	"The Journey"	Noam Murro	Tom Bidwell	22 December 2018	4.64
A rabbit named Fiver has a vision of machines coming to destroy their warren. He and his elder brother Hazel convince some rabbits to leave. A strange rabbit named Cowslip visits the group, offering to let them stay in his warren. Although it is full of well-fed rabbits, morale and numbers are strangely low. Bigwig is caught by a snare and starts to suffocate. Cowslip reveals that those snared are given to a farmer in exchange for food and protection. The rabbits free Bigwig and leave, with a doe named Strawberry joining them. They settle in a new warren, naming it Watership Down.
2	"The Raid"	Noam Murro	Tom Bidwell	22 December 2018	4.64
Holly recounts his travels to find the group. Kehaar, a seagull with an injured wing, crashes in front of the group, and Hazel befriends the bird in order to ask him to look for does. He flies off and returns with word of a nearby warren. Holly, Blackberry, and Bluebell are stopped by soldiers from the nearby warren of Efrafa and brought before its leader, General Woundwort, where they are imprisoned. The following night, Holly's group stages a breakout. While looking for does, Hazel is shot in the leg by a farmer and collapses into a storm drain. In a state of limbo, Hazel is visited by the Black Rabbit of Inlé, the Lapine grim reaper, and she assures him his time has not yet come.
3	"The Escape"	Noam Murro	Tom Bidwell	23 December 2018	5.65
Bigwig finds Hazel and helps him return to Watership Down. A plan is hatched to infiltrate Efrafa and save the imprisoned does. After earning the trust of Hyzenthlay, the leader of the Efrafan does, Bigwig attempts an escape from the warren alongside them, but they are caught. Hyzenthlay is accused of the escape plan and sentenced to execution. Bigwig is ordered to act as executioner in order to prove his loyalty to Efrafa. He declines, fighting off the soldiers and helping the does escape. They reunite with Hazel's group but are surrounded by Efrafan soldiers. Woundwort challenges Bigwig to a fight to the death.
4	"The Siege"	Noam Murro	Tom Bidwell	23 December 2018	6.78
Kehaar comes to their rescue and fights off the Efrafans. The rabbits hide in a nearby human village and thank Kehaar for his bravery the next morning. The group returns to Watership Down, but they encounter an Efrafa scouting party. Watership Down prepares for war; many are wounded and Holly is killed. Bigwig fights Woundwort. Fiver is captured by the farm cat, and Hazel abandons him to lure the dog to the warren. The dog and Woundwort lunge at each other, leaving the fate of Woundwort unknown. The warren prospers in the years that follow.

== Reception ==
Watership Down received generally positive reviews from critics, with praise for the narrative, performances of its voice cast and soundtrack, but receiving some criticism for its somewhat tamer tone and the quality of the computer animation, described as "soulless" and "clunky". On Rotten Tomatoes, the drama has an approval rating of 74% based on reviews from 23 critics, with its critical consensus reading "Though its animation leaves something to be desired, Watership Down is a faithful adaptation that will resonate with viewers of any age." On Metacritic, it has a weighted average score of 76 out of 100 based on five critics, indicating "generally favourable reviews".

The Guardian and The Independent both gave it two stars out of five, calling the production "tame, drab and deeply unsatisfying." and "spectacularly ho-hum – less tooth and claw than head shake."

The Times was more positive, giving it three stars out of five, writing "this was a meaty, lovingly made production that, spread over two days, felt far too long," while The New York Times noted that though the adaptation "fails its potential, it benefits from strong voice performances and a solid central story. Even this easy-listening version, which lays on the romance, jokes and limp dialogue, has moments of grandeur and the sweep of a fantasy epic."

The drama won a Daytime Emmy Award for Outstanding Special Class Animated Program. It also got nominated for a Daytime creative arts Emmy awards for outstanding directing, sound editing, sound mixing, graphic design and music direction.
