= Gloria Allen =

American transgender activist (1945–2022)

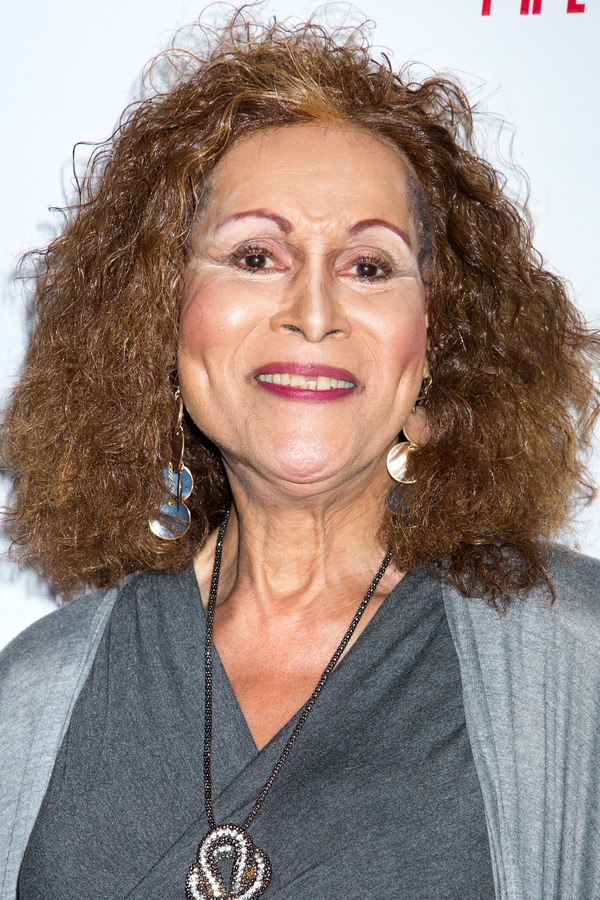
- Allen in 2022
- Born: August 6, 1945; Bowling Green, Kentucky, U.S.
- Died: June 13, 2022 (aged 76); Chicago, Illinois, U.S.
- Occupation: Transgender activist

Gloria Allen (October 6, 1945 – June 13, 2022) was an American transgender activist who ran a charm school for transgender youth in Chicago's Center on Halsted.

Allen's school lasted only a few years — she was not paid, and she often used her own money to prepare students' meals — but inspired a hit play, Charm, by Philip Dawkins. Her experiences were chronicled in the documentary film, Mama Gloria.

== Early life ==
Allen was born in Bowling Green, Kentucky but raised in Chicago. The eldest of eight children, her mother was Alma Dixon, a showgirl and former Jet magazine centerfold. She transitioned before Stonewall with the support of her mother Alma and her grandmother, Mildred, a seamstress for crossdressers and strippers. "My mother said she knew and she knew the hard times that were out there for me, but she told me, 'If you have any problem, you can come to me.' And I did," Allen said on the LGBTQ&A podcast. "Back then, the trans girls were more committed to each other, helping them out, showing them the things that they need to know. I picked up from that and I learned a lot from the older generation, how to dress, how to socialize with them...They watched over me." Allen's parents weren't married and she did not have much contact with her biological father.

== Personal life ==
She lived with an abusive boyfriend for ten years. Allen shot her boyfriend, injuring him, but he never reported it to the authorities. She was reportedly involved in several abusive relationships.

== Career ==
Allen worked at the University of Chicago Hospital as a licensed practical nurse and then in private homes as a nurse's aide.

== Awards ==
In 2014, Allen received the Living Legend Award at the Trans 100 Awards from transgender activists Janet Mock and Precious Brady-Davis. In 2021, she received the Carmen Vázquez Award for Excellence in Leadership on Aging Issues from SAGE, an advocacy organization for L.G.B.T.Q. elders, at the National LGBTQ Task Force's Creating Change conference.

== Death ==
She died on June 13, 2022, from respiratory failure in her sleep at her apartment in Chicago's Townhall Apartments, an LGBTQ senior living facility.
