= Gloria the Blackout =

2024 concert tour by Sam Smith

- Tour by Sam Smith
- Location: Latin America; Europe
- Associated album: Gloria
- Start date: March 16, 2024
- End date: September 8, 2024
- No. of shows: 29
- Producer: Live Nation

Sam Smith concert chronology
- Gloria the Tour (2023); Gloria the Blackout (2024); To Be Free (2025-26)

The Gloria the Blackout was a 2024 concert tour by English singer Sam Smith, staged in support of their fourth studio album Gloria (2023). Unlike Smith’s previous arena-based tours, this run was structured as a festival-focused tour, consisting primarily of appearances at major international music festivals across Latin America and Europe.

The tour was officially announced in December 2023 and was promoted by Live Nation. It marked a more selective and curated live presence for Smith in 2024, emphasizing high-profile festival performances rather than an extensive standalone global tour.

== Background ==
Following the release and commercial success of Gloria, Sam Smith opted for a different touring strategy compared to earlier cycles. Instead of embarking on a traditional headline arena tour, the artist participated in a series of prominent music festivals, allowing for broader international reach while maintaining a limited number of performances.

The decision aligned with evolving industry trends in which major artists leverage festival circuits to engage diverse audiences across multiple regions in a condensed timeframe. The tour also reflected Smith’s continued artistic evolution, incorporating theatrical visuals and darker, more experimental themes inspired by the Gloria era.

Because of its structure, the tour was categorized as a festival tour, with performances integrated into existing festival lineups rather than standalone concerts.

== Setlist ==
1. "Stay With Me"
2. "I'm Not the Only One"
3. "Like I Can"
4. "Too Good at Goodbyes"
5. "Diamonds"
6. "How Do You Sleep?"
7. "Dancing with a Stranger"
8. "Good Thing"
9. "Lay Me Down"
10. "Gimme
11. "Lose You"
12. "Promises"
13. "I'm Not Here to Make Friends"
14. "Desire"
15. "Latch"
16. "I Feel Love"
17. "Gloria"
18. "Unholy"

== Tour dates ==
List of 2024 concerts
Date (2024)	City	Country	Venue
March 16 (Note: Part of the Lollapalooza)	Buenos Aires	Argentina	Hipódromo de San Isidro
March 17 (Note: Part of the Lollapalooza)	Santiago	Chile	Bicentennial Park of Cerrillos
March 20	Lima	Peru	Estadio Nacional
March 22 (Note: Part of the Festival Estéreo Picnic)	Bogotá	Colombia	Simón Bolívar Park
March 24 (Note: Part of the Lollapalooza)	São Paulo	Brazil	Interlagos Circuit
May 17 (Note: Part of the Tecate Emblema)	Mexico City	Mexico	Autódromo Hermanos Rodríguez
June 23 (Note: Part of the Pinkpop Festival)	Landgraaf	Netherlands	Megaland
June 28 (Note: Part of the Solidays)	Paris	France	Longchamp Racecourse
June 30	Linz	Austria	Jahrmarktgelände
July 3 (Note: Part of the Stavernfestivalen)	Larvik	Norway	Larvik Golf Arena
July 5 (Note: Part of the Open'er Festival)	Gdynia	Poland	Gdynia-Kosakowo Airport
July 6 (Note: Part of the Main Square Festival)	Arras	France	La Citadelle
July 9 (Note: Part of the Monte-Carlo Summer Festival)	Monte Carlo	Monaco	Étoiles Sporting Club
July 11 (Note: Part of the Les Vieilles Charrues)	Carhaix-Plouguer	France	La Prairie de Kerampuilh
July 13	Luxembourg		Luxexpo
July 18 (Note: Part of the Colours of Ostrava)	Ostrava	Czech Republic	Lower Vítkovice
July 20 (Note: Part of the Lucca Summer Festival)	Lucca	Italy	Piazza Napoleone
July 24 (Note: Part of the Paléo Festival)	Nyon	Switzerland	Plaine de l'Asse
July 26 (Note: Part of the Jazzopen)	Stuttgart	Germany	Schlossplatz
August 8 (Note: Part of the Smukfest)	Skanderborg	Denmark	Jægersborg Dyrehave
August 10 (Note: Part of the Untold Festival)	Cluj-Napoca	Romania	Cluj Arena
August 11 (Note: Part of the Sziget Festival)	Budapest	Hungary	Hajógyári Island
August 17 (Note: Part of the Pukkelpop)	Hasselt	Belgium	Domein Kiewit
August 21	Stockholm	Sweden	Gröna Lund
August 23 (Note: Part of the Zürich Openair)	Rümlang (Note: Labeled as Zurich in promotional material)	Switzerland	Glattbrug
August 29 (Note: Part of the Kalorama Festival)	Lisbon	Portugal	Bela Vista Park
August 31 (Note: Part of the Kalorama Festival)	Madrid	Spain	IFEMA Exhibition Centre
September 7 (Note: Part of the Superbloom)	Munich	Germany	Olympiastadion
September 8 (Note: Part of the Lollapalooza)	Berlin	Germany	Olympiapark Berlin
