= Vulgar (song) =

Single by Sam Smith and Madonna
- Released: 9 June 2023
- Recorded: 6 February 2023
- Genre: EDM; trance
- Length: 2:35
- Label: Capitol
- Songwriters: Sam Smith; Madonna; Ilya Salmanzadeh; Ryan Tedder; Omer Fedi; Henry Walter; James Napier
- Producers: Ilya; Cirkut; Omer Fedi; Ryan Tedder; Sam Smith

Sam Smith singles chronology
"I'm Not Here to Make Friends" (2023)	"Vulgar" (2023)	"Desire" (2023)

Madonna singles chronology
"Popular" (2023)	"Vulgar" (2023)	"Bring Your Love" (2026)

Visualiser
- "Sam Smith, Madonna - VULGAR (Visualiser)" on YouTube

"Vulgar" is a song recorded by the English singer Sam Smith and American singer Madonna, released as a single on 9 June 2023. Both singers wrote the track alongside Ilya Salmanzadeh, Ryan Tedder, Omer Fedi, Henry Walter, and James Napier.

== Background and release ==
Sam Smith released their fourth studio album, Gloria, in January 2023. The album was supported by several singles, including "Unholy" (2022), which reached number one on record charts. Sam Smith performed the song with Kim Petras at the 65th Annual Grammy Awards on 5 February 2023, which was introduced by Madonna. While introducing the performance, Madonna gave a speech about controversy, stating: "I'm here to give thanks to all the rebels out there forging a new path and taking the heat for all of it. You guys need to know — all you troublemakers out there — you need to know that your fearlessness doesn't go unnoticed. You are seen, you are heard; and most of all, you are appreciated." The song won the Grammy Award for Best Pop Duo/Group Performance at the ceremony. One day later, Smith recorded "Vulgar" with Madonna, and called the experience "an amazing evening creating and writing and expressing".

Smith began teasing a collaboration with Madonna on 24 May 2023 while on his Gloria the Tour (2023), sharing a video clip that stated: "Manchester, we've got a surprise for you this evening. 'Unholy' won't be the last song...." Unfortunately, the show was cut short after five songs due to vocal chord issues, and the song was not premiered there, but it was teased for over a week. In May 2023, Madonna shared the song's artwork, which depicts their bodies in "a pair of tightly cinched black-and-white corsets", underneath Smith and Madonna's initials shortened to just "S&M". According to Sam Smith, both Madonna and the accompanying songwriters went to the studio the following day from the Grammy awards to record the music. Sam Smith stated the song is "very special to me", and continued saying: "Me, the QUEEN, and a group of some of the most talented people I know ... created this piece of music. The creativity was pure and the energy was alive". In a conversation with Zane Lowe on Apple Music 1, Smith called "Vulgar", "one of the most exciting songs I've been a part of".

Regarded as a "highly" or "much-anticipated" track by publications such as Rolling Stone, American Songwriter, New York Daily News, The Music and Metro Weekly, "Vulgar" was released on 9 June 2023. Upon its release, it won a poll conducted by Billboard as reader's favorite new music release of the week.

== Composition ==
Based on its snippet, iHeartRadio's Rebekah Gonzalez commented that it "sounds like it's taking heavy influence from ballroom music, which is music created especially for voguing". Described as a dance-party anthem and a "club-ready" banger song, it contains Middle Eastern-influenced strings, with electronic elements.

It contains spoken words, while Exclaim!'s Sydney Brasil and Alexis Petridis from The Guardian noted the absence of a chorus. Thematically, "Vulgar" explores the concept of embracing a provocative demeanor, and track about the beauty in being sexy and free, the power of self-expression, and "the importance of doing what you want while paying no attention to haters" according to Muri Assunção from the New York Daily News. Some critics noted its features a cheeky nod to Madonna's "Into the Groove" (1985) in its lyrics, while shows a self-referential Madonna in the style of "Bitch I'm Madonna" (2015). Others labeled it as a continuation of Sam Smith and Kim Petras' "Unholy".

== Critical reception ==
Writing for NME, Liberty Dunworth called it a "sultry" single, while Mey Rude from Out referred to it as a "sexy and slinky" song, "with a heavy beat perfect for grinding in the gay club at 2am". Sal Cinquemani, music critic of Slant magazine describes "it's messy, it's campy, and it's gloriously self-aware" and is a "very much a transgressive, capital-S statement" song but he felt "isn't spit-shined for mass consumption". Joey Nolfi from Entertainment Weekly named it a "delicious" banger, and claimed "Madonna dominates the deliciously obscene manifesto with lyrics that offer a stern warning to the musical duo's detractors". Jamie Tabberer from Attitude gave three out of five stars labelling it as "a jaw-dropping declaration of resistance". American Songwriter's Tiffany Goldstein called it a "bold and fearless anthem". Cervanté Pope from Consequence felt "'Vulgar' isn't unnecessarily filthy — rather, the artists are asserting a message of empowerment, and demanding respect". Similar to Pope, The Music's Mary Varvaris commented "isn't sexually explicit like some would expect [...] but its language certainly is".

The Economic Times labeled it as a "sizzling" and "scintillating" collaboration "which showcases their sensual prowess". Similarly, Hugh McIntyre from Metro Weekly said it "showcases the audacity that these two icons are renowned for", and while he called it an "undeniably a solid offering", editor continued saying "it fails to rank among the most remarkable compositions from either artist's repertoire", considering "the megawatt talent involved, it's a bit disappointing". Giving only two out of five stars, Alexis Petridis from The Guardian reacted critical calling it "a tame attempt at manufacturing outrage".

Variety named "Vulgar" one of the worst songs of 2023. The song achieved a nomination at the 2024 Queerty Awards in the category Best Anthem.

== Commercial performance ==
"Vulgar" debuted at number 11 on the Billboard multi-metric chart Hot Dance/Electronic Songs with 3,000 downloads and 1.8 million official streams according to Luminate. In the United Kingdom, "Vulgar" debuted at number 69 with 8,154 sales in its first week according to the Official Charts Company. Elsewhere, it charted in a number of countries including Greece, Hungary, Ireland and New Zealand.

== Track listing ==
- Digital download / streaming single
1. "Vulgar" – 2:35
- Digital download / streaming single – remix
1. "Vulgar" (Marlon Hoffstadt remix) – 2:56

== Charts ==
Chart performance for "Vulgar"
Chart (2023)	Peak position
Canadian Digital Song Sales (Billboard)	20
Chile Anglo (Monitor Latino)	9
Costa Rica Anglo (Monitor Latino)	7
Ecuador Anglo (Monitor Latino)	16
Germany Download Singles (Official German Charts)	15
Greece International (IFPI)	65
Guatemala Anglo (Monitor Latino)	3
Honduras Anglo (Monitor Latino)	9
Hungary (Single Top 40)	25
Ireland (IRMA)	77
Japan Hot Overseas (Billboard Japan)	11
Netherlands (Dutch Top 40 Tipparade)	26
New Zealand Hot Singles (RMNZ)	21
Panama Anglo (Monitor Latino)	3
South Korea BGM (Circle)	120
South Korea Download (Circle)	169
Sweden Heatseeker (Sverigetopplistan)	9
UK Singles (Official Charts)	69
US Digital Song Sales (Billboard)	16
US Hot Dance/Electronic Songs (Billboard)	11

== Certifications ==
Certifications for "Vulgar"
Region	Certification	Certified units/sales
Brazil (Pro-Música Brasil)	Gold	20,000^{‡}
^{‡} Sales+streaming figures based on certification alone.

== Release history ==
Release dates and format(s) for "Vulgar"
Region	Date	Format(s)	Version	Label	Ref.
Various	9 June 2023	Digital download; streaming	Original	Capitol	
Italy	9 June 2023	Radio airplay	Original	Universal	
Various	30 June 2023	Digital download; streaming	Marlon Hoffstadt remix	Capitol	
