= Desire (Calvin Harris and Sam Smith song) =

Single by Calvin Harris and Sam Smith
- Released: 28 July 2023
- Genre: Trance
- Length: 2:59
- Label: Columbia; Sony Music UK
- Songwriters: Adam Wiles; Sam Smith; Matthew Burns; Jake Torrey; Sam Roman
- Producers: Calvin Harris; Burns

Calvin Harris singles chronology
| "Miracle" (2023) | "Desire" (2023) | "Body Moving" (2023) |

Sam Smith singles chronology
| "Vulgar" (2023) | "Desire" (2023) | "In the City" (2023) |

Music video
- "Desire" on YouTube

"Desire" is a song by the Scottish DJ and record producer Calvin Harris and the English singer Sam Smith. It was released on 28 July 2023 through Columbia Records and Sony Music UK and included on Harris' first compilation album, 96 Months (2024). "Desire" peaked inside top ten in the United Kingdom, Ireland and Belgium.

== Background and release ==
Following the commercial success of their 2018 single "Promises", the duo reunited for a second single after five years. Smith previously worked with Harris as a producer on the song "I'm Not Here to Make Friends", the fourth single of Smith's fourth studio album Gloria.

Starting on 24 June 2023, the track would be previewed during several live performances of Harris' 2023 Ushuaïa tour residency. Based on the performance and their previous collaborations, "Desire" was highly anticipated by fans and publications alike. The song was made available for preorder on 3 July 2023, along with the reveal of the single cover. However, a release date would not be disclosed until a few days before release.

On 8 September 2023, a remix by Brazilian DJ Alok was released. Remixes by other DJs were released between September and October 2023.

== Music video ==
A music video promoting Desire was released on 10 August 2023, depicting drivers racing and drifting with one another at an empty parking lot with Smith singing by his car and in a light-flickering backdrop. Harris also appears in the video as one of the racing participants. As of February 2025, this music video has achieved over 41 million views.

== Track listing ==
- Digital download / streaming single
1. "Desire" – 2:59
- CD single
1. "Desire" – 2:59
2. "Desire" (extended mix) – 4:32
- Digital download / streaming – extended
1. "Desire" (extended) – 4:32
- Digital download / streaming – Alok remix
1. "Desire" (Alok remix) – 2:56
- Digital download / streaming – Hannah Laing remix
1. "Desire" (Hannah Laing remix) – 3:08
- Digital download / streaming – Cedric Gervais remixes
1. "Desire" (Cedric Gervais festival mix) – 4:19
2. "Desire" (Cedric Gervais club mix) – 4:15
- Digital download / streaming – acoustic
1. "Desire" (acoustic) – 3:05
- Digital download / streaming – MEDUZA remix
1. "Desire" (MEDUZA remix) – 3:01
- Digital download / streaming – Don Diablo remix
1. "Desire" (Don Diablo remix) – 3:17
- Digital download / streaming – Steve Aoki & KAAZE remix
1. "Desire" (Steve Aoki & KAAZE remix) – 2:36
- Digital download / streaming – Sub Focus remix
1. "Desire" (Sub Focus remix) – 4:02
- Digital download / streaming – remixes
1. "Desire" (extended) – 4:32
2. "Desire" (Alok remix) – 2:56
3. "Desire" (MEDUZA remix) – 3:01
4. "Desire" (Hannah Laing remix) – 3:08
5. "Desire" (Cedric Gervais festival mix) – 4:19
6. "Desire" (Don Diablo remix) – 3:17
7. "Desire" (Steve Aoki & KAAZE remix) – 2:36
8. "Desire" (Cedric Gervais club mix) – 4:15
9. "Desire" (Sub Focus remix) – 4:02
10. "Desire" (KC Lights remix) – 4:19
11. "Desire" (Wh0 remix) – 3:59
- 12-inch single
1. "Desire" – 2:59
2. "Desire" (extended mix) – 4:32
3. "Desire" (Calvin Harris VIP mix) – 3:07
- Digital download / streaming – Calvin Harris VIP mix
1. "Desire" (Calvin Harris VIP mix) – 3:07

== Charts ==
=== Weekly charts ===
Weekly chart performance for "Desire"
| Chart (2023–2025) | Peak position |
|---|---|
| Australia (ARIA) | 84 |
| Australia Dance (ARIA) | 8 |
| Belarus Airplay (TopHit) | 11 |
| Belgium (Ultratop 50 Flanders) | 7 |
| Belgium (Ultratop 50 Wallonia) | 5 |
| Bulgaria Airplay (PROPHON) | 8 |
| Canada CHR/Top 40 (Billboard) | 50 |
| CIS Airplay (TopHit) | 6 |
| Croatia International Airplay (Top lista) | 13 |
| Czech Republic Airplay (ČNS IFPI) | 44 |
| Denmark (Tracklisten) | 32 |
| Estonia Airplay (TopHit) | 4 |
| France (SNEP) | 28 |
| Germany (GfK) | 78 |
| Global 200 (Billboard) | 105 |
| Hungary (Dance Top 40) | 8 |
| Hungary (Rádiós Top 40) | 8 |
| Iceland (Tónlistinn) | 40 |
| Ireland (IRMA) | 7 |
| Japan Hot Overseas (Billboard Japan) | 11 |
| Kazakhstan Airplay (TopHit) | 10 |
| Latvia Airplay (LaIPA) | 6 |
| Lithuania (AGATA) | 88 |
| Lithuania Airplay (TopHit) | 5 |
| Luxembourg (Billboard) | 19 |
| Moldova Airplay (TopHit) | 38 |
| Netherlands (Dutch Top 40) | 6 |
| Netherlands (Single Top 100) | 11 |
| New Zealand Hot Singles (RMNZ) | 10 |
| Nigeria (TurnTable Top 100) | 44 |
| Poland (Polish Airplay Top 100) | 98 |
| Poland (Polish Streaming Top 100) | 91 |
| Portugal (AFP) | 149 |
| Romania Airplay (TopHit) | 166 |
| Russia Airplay (TopHit) | 9 |
| Slovakia Airplay (ČNS IFPI) | 25 |
| Slovakia Singles Digital (ČNS IFPI) | 81 |
| Suriname (Nationale Top 40) | 31 |
| Sweden (Sverigetopplistan) | 76 |
| Switzerland (Schweizer Hitparade) | 48 |
| Ukraine Airplay (TopHit) | 200 |
| UK Singles (Official Charts) | 6 |
| US Hot Dance/Electronic Songs (Billboard) | 5 |

=== Monthly charts ===
Monthly chart performance for "Desire"
| Chart (2023) | Peak position |
|---|---|
| Belarus Airplay (TopHit) | 16 |
| CIS Airplay (TopHit) | 12 |
| Estonia Airplay (TopHit) | 5 |
| Kazakhstan Airplay (TopHit) | 21 |
| Latvia Airplay (TopHit) | 18 |
| Lithuania Airplay (TopHit) | 5 |
| Moldova Airplay (TopHit) | 38 |
| Russia Airplay (TopHit) | 12 |

=== Year-end charts ===
2023 year-end chart performance for "Desire"
| Chart (2023) | Position |
|---|---|
| Belarus Airplay (TopHit) | 114 |
| Belgium (Ultratop 50 Flanders) | 43 |
| Belgium (Ultratop 50 Wallonia) | 58 |
| CIS Airplay (TopHit) | 72 |
| Estonia Airplay (TopHit) | 52 |
| Lithuania Airplay (TopHit) | 24 |
| Netherlands (Dutch Top 40) | 20 |
| Netherlands (Single Top 100) | 83 |
| Russia Airplay (TopHit) | 68 |
| US Hot Dance/Electronic Songs (Billboard) | 38 |

2024 year-end chart performance for "Desire"
| Chart (2024) | Position |
|---|---|
| Belarus Airplay (TopHit) | 107 |
| Belgium (Ultratop 50 Flanders) | 77 |
| CIS Airplay (TopHit) | 124 |
| Estonia Airplay (TopHit) | 36 |
| Hungary (Dance Top 40) | 50 |
| Hungary (Rádiós Top 40) | 68 |
| Russia Airplay (TopHit) | 104 |

2025 year-end chart performance for "Desire"
| Chart (2025) | Position |
|---|---|
| Estonia Airplay (TopHit) | 192 |
| Hungary (Dance Top 40) | 73 |

== Certifications ==
Certifications for "Desire"
| Region | Certification | Certified units/sales |
|---|---|---|
| Australia (ARIA) | Gold | 35,000^{‡} |
| Belgium (BRMA) | Platinum | 40,000^{‡} |
| Brazil (Pro-Música Brasil) | Gold | 20,000^{‡} |
| Denmark (IFPI Danmark) | Gold | 45,000^{‡} |
| France (SNEP) | Platinum | 200,000^{‡} |
| Hungary (MAHASZ) | Platinum | 4,000^{‡} |
| New Zealand (RMNZ) | Gold | 15,000^{‡} |
| Poland (ZPAV) | Platinum | 50,000^{‡} |
| Spain (Promusicae) | Gold | 30,000^{‡} |
| Switzerland (IFPI Switzerland) | Gold | 15,000^{‡} |
| United Kingdom (BPI) | Platinum | 600,000^{‡} |
^{‡} Sales+streaming figures based on certification alone.

== Release history ==
Release history and formats for "Desire"
| Region | Date | Format | Version | Label | Ref. |
|---|---|---|---|---|---|
| Various | 28 July 2023 | Digital download; streaming | Original | Columbia Records; Sony Music | |
| Italy | 28 July 2023 | Radio airplay | Original | Columbia Records; Sony Music | |
| United Kingdom | 11 August 2023 | CD | Original; extended | Columbia Records; Sony Music | |
| Various | 18 August 2023 | Digital download; streaming | Extended | Columbia Records; Sony Music | |
| Various | 8 September 2023 | Digital download; streaming | Alok remix | Columbia Records; Sony Music | |
| Various | 15 September 2023 | Digital download; streaming | Hannah Laing remix | Columbia Records; Sony Music | |
| Various | 22 September 2023 | Digital download; streaming | Cedric Gervais remixes | Columbia Records; Sony Music | |
| Various | 25 September 2023 | Digital download; streaming | Acoustic | Columbia Records; Sony Music | |
| Various | 29 September 2023 | Digital download; streaming | MEDUZA remix | Columbia Records; Sony Music | |
| Various | 6 October 2023 | Digital download; streaming | Don Diablo remix | Columbia Records; Sony Music | |
| Various | 13 October 2023 | Digital download; streaming | Steve Aoki & KAAZE remix | Columbia Records; Sony Music | |
| Various | 20 October 2023 | Digital download; streaming | Sub Focus remix | Columbia Records; Sony Music | |
| Various | 27 October 2023 | Digital download; streaming | Remixes | Columbia Records; Sony Music | |
| United Kingdom | 27 October 2023 | 12-inch | Original; extended; Calvin Harris VIP mix | Columbia Records; Sony Music | |
| Various | 1 December 2023 | Digital download; streaming | Calvin Harris VIP mix | Columbia Records; Sony Music | |
