= Gloria the Tour =

2023 concert tour by Sam Smith

- Tour by Sam Smith
- Promotional tour poster
- Location: Asia; Europe; North America; Oceania
- Associated album: Gloria
- Start date: 12 April 2023
- End date: 11 November 2023
- Legs: 4
- No. of shows: 78
- Supporting acts: Cat Burns; Jessie Reyez

Sam Smith concert chronology
- The Thrill of It All Tour (2018–19); Gloria the Tour (2023); Gloria the Blackout (2024)

Gloria the Tour (stylised as GLORIA the tour) was the third headlining concert tour by English singer-songwriter, Sam Smith, in support of their fourth studio album Gloria (2023). The tour began on 12 April 2023 at the Sheffield Arena in Sheffield, England, and concluded on 11 November 2023 at the Spark Arena in Auckland, New Zealand. Presenting a concert set in three acts (named, respectively, "LOVE," "Beauty," and "SEX"), the tour comprised 78 shows.

== Setlist ==
This set list is from the show in Sheffield on 12 April 2023. It may not represent all concerts for the duration of the tour.

1. "Stay with Me"
2. "I'm Not the Only One"
3. "Like I Can"
4. "Nirvana"
5. "Too Good at Goodbyes"
6. "To Die For"
7. "Perfect"
8. "How Do You Sleep?"
9. "Dancing with a Stranger"
10. "Kissing You" (Des'ree cover)
11. "Lay Me Down"
12. "Love Goes"
13. "Gimme"
14. "Lose You"
15. "Promises"
16. "I'm Not Here to Make Friends"
17. "Latch"
18. "I Feel Love"
19. "Restart"

Encore

1. "Gloria"
2. "Human Nature" (Madonna cover)
3. "Unholy"

Notes

- Starting on 18 April, "Nirvana" and "Restart" were removed from the setlist and "Diamonds" was added after "Perfect".
- The show in Manchester abruptly ended with "Too Good at Goodbyes", due to Smith's vocal cord injury.

== Shows ==
List of 2023 concerts
Date (2023)	City	Country	Venue	Opening acts	Attendance	Revenue
12 April	Sheffield	England	Utilita Arena	Cat Burns	8,714 / 12,457	$571,924
14 April	Dublin	Ireland	3Arena	Cat Burns	21,317 / 21,317	$1,548,185
15 April	Dublin	Ireland	3Arena	Cat Burns	21,317 / 21,317	$1,548,185
18 April	London	England	The O_{2} Arena	Cat Burns	28,382 / 33,330	$2,349,251
19 April	London	England	The O_{2} Arena	Cat Burns	28,382 / 33,330	$2,349,251
29 April	Copenhagen	Denmark	Royal Arena	Cat Burns	—N/a	—N/a
1 May	Berlin	Germany	Mercedes-Benz Arena	Cat Burns	—N/a	—N/a
4 May	Stockholm	Sweden	Avicii Arena	Cat Burns	—N/a	—N/a
6 May	Oslo	Norway	Oslo Spektrum	Cat Burns	—N/a	—N/a
8 May	Cologne	Germany	Lanxess Arena	Cat Burns	15,893 / 15,893	$1,304,386
9 May	Amsterdam	Netherlands	Ziggo Dome	Cat Burns	—N/a	—N/a
12 May	Antwerp	Belgium	Sportpaleis	Cat Burns	—N/a	—N/a
13 May	Paris	France	Accor Arena	Cat Burns	—N/a	—N/a
18 May	Vienna	Austria	Wiener Stadthalle	Cat Burns	—N/a	—N/a
20 May	Bologna	Italy	Unipol Arena	Cat Burns	—N/a	—N/a
21 May	Turin	Italy	Pala Alpitour	Cat Burns	—N/a	—N/a
5 July (Note: Part of the 2023 Montreux Jazz Festival)	Montreux	Switzerland	Stravinski Auditorium	—N/a	—N/a	—N/a
7 July (Note: Part of the 2023 Mad Cool Festival.)	Madrid	Spain	Nuevo Espacio	—N/a	—N/a	—N/a
8 July (Note: Part of the 2023 NOS Alive.)	Algés	Portugal	Passeio Marítimo	—N/a	—N/a	—N/a
10 July (Note: Part of the 2023 Festival de Nîmes.)	Nîmes	France	Arena of Nîmes	—N/a	—N/a	—N/a
14 July (Note: Part of the 2023 Pori Jazz.)	Pori	Finland	Kirjurinluoto	—N/a	—N/a	—N/a
15 July (Note: Part of the 2023 Positivus Festival.)	Riga	Latvia	Lucavsala	—N/a	—N/a	—N/a
25 July	Miami	United States	Kaseya Center	Jessie Reyez	—N/a	—N/a
26 July	Orlando	United States	Amway Center	Jessie Reyez	—N/a	—N/a
28 July	Duluth	United States	Gas South Arena	Jessie Reyez	—N/a	—N/a
29 July	Nashville	United States	Bridgestone Arena	Jessie Reyez	11,405 / 12,102	$743,231
1 August	Raleigh	United States	PNC Arena	Jessie Reyez	—N/a	—N/a
2 August	Philadelphia	United States	Wells Fargo Center	Jessie Reyez	—N/a	—N/a
4 August	Washington, D.C.	United States	Capital One Arena	Umi	10,984 / 15,959	$988,838
5 August	Boston	United States	TD Garden	Jessie Reyez	—N/a	—N/a
8 August	New York City	United States	Madison Square Garden	Jessie Reyez	26,174 / 26,174	$2,164,843
9 August	New York City	United States	Madison Square Garden	Jessie Reyez	26,174 / 26,174	$2,164,843
11 August	Toronto	Canada	Scotiabank Arena	Jessie Reyez	12,492 / 12,492	$1,080,636
12 August	Montreal	Canada	Bell Centre	Jessie Reyez	13,549 / 13,549	$954,790
15 August	Chicago	United States	United Center	Jessie Reyez	11,329 / 11,329	$1,178,830
16 August	Saint Paul	United States	Xcel Energy Center	Jessie Reyez	—N/a	—N/a
18 August	Denver	United States	Ball Arena	Jessie Reyez	—N/a	—N/a
19 August	Salt Lake City	United States	Delta Center	Jessie Reyez	—N/a	—N/a
22 August	Vancouver	Canada	Rogers Arena	Jessie Reyez	11,654 / 11,654	$901,018
23 August	Seattle	United States	Climate Pledge Arena	Jessie Reyez	11,359 / 11,993	$962,627
25 August	Portland	United States	Veterans Memorial Coliseum	Jessie Reyez	6,779 / 8,226	$555,931
27 August	Oakland	United States	Oakland Arena	Jessie Reyez	9,778 / 10,000	$1,004,136
28 August	San Francisco	United States	Chase Center	Jessie Reyez	9,476 / 10,000	$922,536
31 August	Inglewood (Note: Labelled as Los Angeles in promotional material.)	United States	Kia Forum	Jessie Reyez	—N/a	—N/a
1 September	Inglewood	United States	Kia Forum	Jessie Reyez	—N/a	—N/a
3 September	Phoenix	United States	Footprint Center	Jessie Reyez	10,385 / 11,663	$854,048
5 September	Austin	United States	Moody Center	Jessie Reyez	9,796 / 10,912	$774,124
7 September	Fort Worth	United States	Dickies Arena	Jessie Reyez	9,890 / 11,640	$677,913
8 September	Houston	United States	Toyota Center	Jessie Reyez	8,442 / 10,851	$602,553
11 September	Monterrey	Mexico	Arena Monterrey	Jessie Reyez	21,468 / 21,468	$2,350,230
12 September	Monterrey	Mexico	Arena Monterrey	Jessie Reyez	21,468 / 21,468	$2,350,230
14 September	Mexico City	Mexico	Palacio de los Deportes	Jessie Reyez	36,659 / 36,659	$3,246,346
15 September	Mexico City	Mexico	Palacio de los Deportes	Jessie Reyez	36,659 / 36,659	$3,246,346
3 October	Bangkok	Thailand	IMPACT Arena	—N/a	—N/a	—N/a
6 October	Hong Kong		AsiaWorld–Arena	—N/a	—N/a	—N/a
9 October	Taipei	Taiwan	Taipei Arena	—N/a	—N/a	—N/a
11 October	Osaka	Japan	Osaka Municipal Central Gymnasium	—N/a	—N/a	—N/a
13 October	Yokohama	Japan	K-Arena Yokohama	—N/a	—N/a	—N/a
17 October	Seoul	South Korea	KSPO Dome	—N/a	—N/a	—N/a
18 October	Seoul	South Korea	KSPO Dome	—N/a	—N/a	—N/a
21 October	Pasay (Note: Labelled as Manila in promotional material.)	Philippines	SM Mall of Asia Arena	—N/a	—N/a	—N/a
24 October	Singapore		Singapore Indoor Stadium	—N/a	—N/a	—N/a
28 October	Adelaide	Australia	Adelaide Entertainment Centre	Meg Mac	8,587 / 8,587	$686,525
31 October	Melbourne	Australia	Rod Laver Arena	Meg Mac	25,195 / 25,195	$1,966,333
1 November	Melbourne	Australia	Rod Laver Arena	Meg Mac	25,195 / 25,195	$1,966,333
3 November	Sydney	Australia	Qudos Bank Arena	Meg Mac	27,314 / 27,314	$2,099,014
4 November	Sydney	Australia	Qudos Bank Arena	Meg Mac	27,314 / 27,314	$2,099,014
8 November	Brisbane	Australia	Brisbane Entertainment Centre	Meg Mac	10,601 / 10,601	$820,766
11 November	Auckland	New Zealand	Spark Arena	Meg Mac	10,671 / 10,671	$776,585
Total					388,293 / 412,036 (94%)	$32,085,599

=== Cancelled shows ===
Date (2023)	City	Country	Venue	Cause
24 May	Manchester	England	AO Arena	Vocal cord issues after four songs
25 May (Note: The Glasgow concert was to be held on 22 April but was moved due to crew illness.)	Glasgow	Scotland	OVO Hydro	Vocal cord injury
27 May (Note: The Birmingham concert was to be held on 25 April but was moved due to crew illness.)	Birmingham	England	Resorts World Arena	Vocal cord injury
1 June	Tel Aviv	Israel	Yarkon Park	Logistical and technical difficulties
3 June (Note: Part of the 2023 Orange Warsaw Festival.)	Warsaw	Poland	Służewiec Racetrack	Illness
4 June (Note: Part of the 2023 Summer in the City.)	Bucharest	Romania	Piața Constituției	Unspecified
14 October	Yokohama	Japan	K-Arena Yokohama	Illness
