= Night Before Christmas (song) =

Single by Sam Smith
- Released: 18 November 2022
- Length: 3:36
- Label: Capitol
- Songwriters: Sam Smith; Simon Aldred
- Producers: David Odlum; Smith; Aldred

Sam Smith singles chronology
"Unholy" (2022)	"Night Before Christmas" (2022)	"Gimme" (2023)

Music video
- "Night Before Christmas" (Lyric Video) on YouTube

"Night Before Christmas" is a song by the English singer Sam Smith, released through Capitol Records on 18 November 2022 as a standalone single. It was written by Smith and Simon Aldred, and produced by David Odlum, Smith and Aldred. "Night Before Christmas" was later added to Smith's previously released 2020 extended play, The Holly & the Ivy. On 20 November 2023, it was included on Smith's new extended play, A Lonely Christmas.

== Charts ==
Chart performance for "Night Before Christmas"
Chart (2022–2023)	Peak position
Austria (Ö3 Austria Top 40)	68
Canada Hot AC (Billboard)	47
Germany (GfK)	67
Italy (FIMI)	69
New Zealand Hot Singles (RMNZ)	36
Sweden (Sverigetopplistan)	61

== Release history ==
Release history and formats for "Night Before Christmas"
Region	Date	Format	Label	Ref.
Various	18 November 2022	Digital download; streaming	Capitol	
