= Love Me More (Sam Smith song) =

Single by Sam Smith

from the album Gloria
- Released: 28 April 2022
- Length: 3:23 (album version); 3:10 (single)
- Label: Capitol
- Songwriters: Sam Smith; James Napier; Mikkel S. Eriksen; Tor E. Hermansen
- Producers: StarGate; Jimmy Napes; Smith

Sam Smith singles chronology
"You Will Be Found" (2021)	"Love Me More" (2022)	"Unholy" (2022)

Music video
- "Love Me More" on YouTube

"Love Me More" is a song by the English singer Sam Smith, released as a single on 28 April 2022 through Capitol Records. It is included on Smith's fourth studio album, Gloria (2023).

== Composition ==
The song was written and produced by Smith, Mikkel S. Eriksen and Tor Hermansen of Stargate and Jimmy Napes. Smith explained the meaning of the song, stating that he wrote it "for anyone who feels different, anyone who has to stop themselves every day from saying unkind things to themselves, in their head, all the time" and that "I'm learning how to just be nice to myself. I wanted to share that because I captured it in this song".

== Reception ==
Tomás Mier of Rolling Stone described the song as a "melancholic track" that "turns into a self-empowering anthem". Rania Aniftos of Billboard called the song "empowering" and felt that Smith's "honeyed vocals ring through the pensive chorus".

== Music video ==
The music video, directed by Luke Monaghan, was released on 28 April 2022, and includes a montage of footage of Smith as a child through to the beginning of their career, as well as Smith dancing at a party with their friends. The video also contains an homage to the video for Smith's breakthrough song "Stay with Me", with Smith walking down stairs as they did in the video for "Stay with Me".

== Track listing ==
Digital download / streaming

1. "Love Me More" – 3:10

Digital download / streaming (Acoustic)

1. "Love Me More" (Acoustic) – 3:22

== Charts ==
=== Weekly charts ===
Weekly chart performance for "Love Me More"
Chart (2022)	Peak position
Canada Hot 100 (Billboard)	52
Canada AC (Billboard)	15
Canada CHR/Top 40 (Billboard)	15
Canada Hot AC (Billboard)	19
Global 200 (Billboard)	117
Iceland (Tónlistinn)	31
Ireland (IRMA)	54
Japan Hot Overseas (Billboard Japan)	19
Lebanon (Lebanese Top 20)	17
New Zealand Hot Singles (RMNZ)	5
San Marino (SMRRTV Top 50)	47
South Africa Streaming (TOSAC)	100
South Korea Download (Gaon)	76
Sweden Heatseeker (Sverigetopplistan)	7
UK Singles (Official Charts)	52
US Billboard Hot 100	73
US Adult Contemporary (Billboard)	25
US Adult Pop Airplay (Billboard)	14
US Dance Airplay (Billboard)	16
US Pop Airplay (Billboard)	14

=== Year-end charts ===
Year-end chart performance for "Love Me More"
Chart (2022)	Position
US Adult Top 40 (Billboard)	40
US Mainstream Top 40 (Billboard)	45

== Certifications ==
Certifications for "Love Me More"
Region	Certification	Certified units/sales
Australia (ARIA)	Gold	35,000^{‡}
Brazil (Pro-Música Brasil)	Gold	20,000^{‡}
Canada (Music Canada)	Gold	40,000^{‡}
New Zealand (RMNZ)	Gold	15,000^{‡}
^{‡} Sales+streaming figures based on certification alone.

== Release history ==
Release history and formats for "Love Me More"
Region	Date	Format	Version	Label	Ref.
Various	28 April 2022	Digital download; streaming	Original	Capitol	
Italy	29 April 2022	Contemporary hit radio	Original	Universal	
United States	2 May 2022	Adult contemporary radio	Original	Capitol	
United States	3 May 2022	Contemporary hit radio	Original	Capitol	
Various	20 May 2022	Digital download; streaming	Acoustic	Capitol	
