= Rapture (EP) =

EP by Koffee
- Released: 14 March 2019
- Genre: Pop; afrobeats; dancehall; trap; reggae
- Length: 15:30
- Label: Columbia

Koffee chronology
Rapture (2019)	Gifted (2022)

Rapture is the debut extended play by Jamaican reggae singer Koffee. It was released on 14 March 2019 through Promised Land Recordings and Columbia Records. It won the Grammy Award for Best Reggae Album at the 62nd Annual Grammy Awards, making Koffee both the first female and youngest artist (at 19 years old) to win the award. After being nominated, Koffee stated: "I'm very honored, I'm very happy and very satisfied. I put a lot of work into my first project and to see that it has been recognized on this level has really fulfilled me so I'm very thankful."

Rapture debuted atop the US Billboard Top Reggae Albums chart, staying there for 32 weeks.

The song "Toast" was certified platinum in the United Kingdom, and received a music video.

== Track listing ==
No.	Title	Length
1.	"Rapture"	3:01
2.	"Toast"	3:11
3.	"Blazin" (featuring Jane Macgizmo)	3:20
4.	"Throne"	2:38
5.	"Raggamuffin"	3:20
Total length:		15:30

== Charts ==
Chart (2019)	Peak position
US Reggae Albums (Billboard)	1
