= Gifted (album) =

Studio album by Original Koffee
- Released: 25 March 2022
- Length: 28:35
- Label: Promised Land; Columbia
- Producer: Original Koffee; JAE5; Frank Dukes

Original Koffee chronology
Rapture (2019)	Gifted (2022)

Gifted is the debut studio album by Jamaican reggae singer Original Koffee. It was released on 25 March 2022 by Promised Land Recordings and Columbia Records.

Gifted debuted at number 2 on the US Billboard Reggae Albums chart with 3,500 album-equivalent units. The album has sold 188,000 units as of April 2022.

== Background ==
The album was preceded by the single "Lockdown", a commentary on the COVID-19 pandemic released in the summer of 2020. Many of the album's lyrics focus on themes of perseverance and overcoming struggles. Gifted expands beyond the dancehall reggae of Koffee's debut EP Rapture (2019), into roots reggae, pop, and R&B influences. The album's lyrics include homages to influential reggae musicians and Jamaican culture, and includes a prominent sample from "Redemption Song" by Bob Marley.

== Critical reception ==
The album received generally favorable reviews from critics, often due to its positive lyrical attitude. Pitchfork praised the album as "Breezy, uplifting, and never forced" with a "a proud and pure undertone" to Koffee's performances. NME praised Koffee's "effortless vocals, smart lyricism and obvious ability to craft new bangers". Rolling Stone praised the album as "a portrait of a brilliant young artist keenly aware of the miracles that lift her up". Medium noted that the album's title is a valid description of Koffee's abilities, and concluded that the album "fires on all cylinders" with a "sunny and multifaceted" sound, but at just 28 minutes it is too short to satisfy all listeners.

Some reviewers were more critical. For example, a reviewer for Slant Magazine stated that the album's boastful attitude and frequent allusions to modern trends "can feel awkward and misplaced", while the album only partially displays Koffee's strengths as a singer and songwriter. The Guardian noted that Koffee's "desire to appeal to a broad audience causes the album to stumble", and added that some genre experiments are uninspired, but concluded that the album is generally "smart and inventive".

== Track listing ==
Gifted track listing
No.	Title	Writer(s)	Length
1.	"x10"	Mikayla Victoria Simpson; Tamara Chang	2:01
2.	"Defend"	Simpson; Kendrick Lamar	0:58
3.	"Shine"	Simpson; Jonathan Mensah	2:33
4.	"Gifted"	Simpson	2:46
5.	"Lonely"	Simpson; Chang; Keneil Delisser; Kawain Williamson; Ottmar Campbell; Ryan Bailey; Nicolas Groskopf; Wayne Thompson	4:09
6.	"Run Away"	Simpson; Delisser; Williamson; Chang; Campbell; Groskopf; Bailey; Jean Andre Lowell Lawrence	3:04
7.	"Where I'm From"	Simpson; Delisser; Chang; Williamson; Campbell; Groskopf; Bailey; Romaine Arnett	3:22
8.	"West Indies"	Simpson; Chang; Bailey; Lionel Richie; Iotosh Israel Mykal Geister Poyser	3:57
9.	"Pull Up"	Simpson; Mensah	2:51
10.	"Lockdown"	Simpson; Waldane Hugh Wayne Hampton; Nathaneal Brown	3:00
Total length:			28:35

== Charts ==
Chart (2022)	Peak position
US Reggae Albums (Billboard)	2
