= Original Koffee =

Jamaican musician (born 2000)

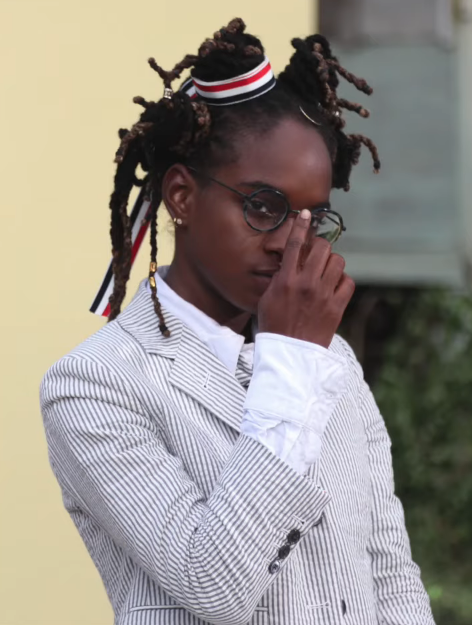
- Original Koffee in 2020

Background information
- Also known as: Koffee (2017–2025)
- Born: Mikayla Victoria Simpson; 16 February 2000 (age 26)
- Origin: Spanish Town, Jamaica
- Genres: Pop; Melodic Rap; Trap; Dancehall; Reggae
- Occupations: Rapper; singer; songwriter; guitarist
- Years active: 2017–present
- Label: Promised Land/Columbia Records
- Website: www.originalkoffee.com

Mikayla Victoria Simpson (born 16 February 2000), who performs under the stage name Original Koffee and formerly as Koffee, is a Jamaican singer, songwriter, rapper, and guitarist from Spanish Town. She released her debut single "Burning" in 2017, and signed with Columbia Records after releasing another single the following year. Her 2019 debut EP Rapture won the Grammy Award for Best Reggae Album at the 62nd Annual Grammy Awards. Her most recent album, Gifted was released on 25 March 2022.

== Early life and career ==
Koffee's mother was an occasional actress, Seventh-day Adventist, and a Ministry of Health employee. Koffee's first musical inspirations stemmed from her mother's religious background. She sang in her church choir, taught herself guitar at the age of 12 on an instrument borrowed from a friend, and began writing lyrics inspired by listening to reggae singer Protoje. She attended Ardenne High School in Kingston, Jamaica.

=== 2010s ===
In 2016, she won her school talent show at Ardenne High School located in Kingston, Jamaica without realizing that the informal show at which she performed in her school cafeteria had been an audition. She went on to learn music theory and vocal technique in her high school choir. A defining moment for Koffee occurred in her final year of high school when she performed at her school's talent show with other gifted artists in front of about 1,000 people. She indicated that the show gave her the first bit of confidence to perform and deliver music live.

Koffee gained popularity after uploading a video to Instagram of her singing. In 2017 she released her first single, "Legend", with just her voice and acoustic guitar. A tribute to Jamaican sprinter Usain Bolt, the song became a viral Instagram hit, once the athlete reposted it on his own Instagram. Awareness of the violence and social problems she witnessed growing up has influenced her lyrics, and besides Protoje and Chronixx she has cited Super Cat and Giggs among her musical inspirations.

Koffee was introduced by Cocoa Tea at the Rebel Salute, a reggae festival, and has also performed with her musical inspirations Protoje and Chronixx.

"Burning", her take on Upsetta Records' Ouji Riddim (which had been made popular by Jamaican artists Busy Signal and Luciano), followed. "Burning" grew out of her desire to inspire herself to push forward despite disappointment at not getting into post-secondary Sixth Form after she graduated from Ardenne High School. In June she spent three weeks at number one on The Foundation Radio Network's Top 30 Reggae Chart covering New York City and South Florida.

In 2018, Jamaican reggae/dancehall singer, songwriter, and deejay Cocoa Tea brought her on stage at the 2018 Rebel Salute and Rototom Sunsplash in Jamaica and Spain respectively. Protoje asked her to perform with him. Chronixx invited her to join him on a BBC Radio 1Xtra broadcast from Tuff Gong Studios, and she went on to tour with him in the UK at venues such as Bush Hall and at Alexandra Palace. Koffee and Chronixx appeared on BBC Music Introducing...LIVE on 10 November.

Koffee's December 2018 single "Raggamuffin" called out gun violence and governmental neglect of the youth. BBC Radio 1Xtra named Koffee one of its "Hot for 2019" artists. Her next single, "Toast", was produced by (izybeats) and (Walshy Fire) of Major Lazer. Both Chronixx and Protoje appear in the video. In 2019, Tory Lanez made a remix to "Toast" as a part of his International Fargo project which can be found on SoundCloud.

In 2018, she also signed with Columbia Records UK, and Rapture. Her debut EP on the label, was released on 14 March, 2019. Her "Throne" video, which takes viewers on a tour through her home town of Spanish Town, Jamaica, debuted on The Fader on 22 January 2019. On 13 November 2019, Koffee was announced as an opening act for Harry Styles on select dates of the North American leg of his 2020 Love On Tour, and on 3 December as an opening act for the Latin American leg.

On 26 November 2019, Koffee released her first cross-over collaborative single "W", featuring hip-hop artist Gunna. The song was later featured on the fictional iFruit Radio station in the video game Grand Theft Auto V.

=== 2020s ===
Rapture won a Grammy Award at the 62nd Annual Grammy Awards, making Koffee the youngest person (at 19 years old) to be awarded in the Best Reggae Album category. Koffee was the musical guest on Nick Cannon's sketch comedy and improv television series Wild 'N Out which aired on 18 February 2020, on VH1.

In October 2020, Koffee was named by Elle magazine as one of "10 Trailblazing Women Changing The Future You Need To Know", the others being: Mowalola Ogunlesi, Tobi Kyeremateng, Ngozi Onwurah, Simi Lindgren, Balanda Atis, Magdalene Abraha, Holly Fischer, Celeste and Margaret Busby.

Her debut full-length album, Gifted, was released on 25 March 2022 to positive reviews.

In April 2025, Koffee returned with a new single, "Koffee". It marked her first release under the new moniker of Original Koffee.

== Awards and nominations ==
Award	Year	Recipient(s) and nominee(s)	Category	Result	Ref.
Grammy Awards	2020	Rapture	Best Reggae Album	Won	
Grammy Awards	2023	Gifted	Best Reggae Album	Nominated	
MOBO Awards	2020	Herself	Best Reggae Act	Nominated	
MOBO Awards	2020	Herself	Best International Act	Nominated	
MOBO Awards	2022	Herself	Best Caribbean Music Act	Nominated	
NAACP Image Awards	2021	Lockdown	Outstanding international song	Won	
Black Reel Awards	2022	The Harder They Fall” (song)	Outstanding Original Song	Nominated	
Hollywood Music In Media Awards	2022	Vroom (with The FaNaTix, Idris Elba, Lil Tjay, Davido, Moelogo)	Best Original Song – Video Game	Nominated	
IRAWMA (International Reggae & World Music Awards)	2023	Herself	Emperor of Reggae & World Music Bob Marley Award for Entertainer of the Year	Nominated	
IRAWMA (International Reggae & World Music Awards)	2023	Herself	Best Female Vocalist	Nominated	
IRAWMA (International Reggae & World Music Awards)	2023	Herself	Peter Tosh Award for Recording Artiste of the Year	Nominated	
IRAWMA (International Reggae & World Music Awards)	2023	Herself	Best Female Dancehall/Rap Artiste	Nominated	
IRAWMA (International Reggae & World Music Awards)	2023	Gifted	Toots Hibbert Award for Best Album/CD	Nominated	

== Discography ==
=== Studio albums ===
Title	Album details	Peak chart positions		
Title	Album details	SWI	UK	US Reggae
Gifted	Released: 25 March 2022; Label: Promised Land, Columbia; Formats: CD, digital download, streaming	39	9	2

=== EPs ===
Title	EP details	Peak chart positions
Title	EP details	US Reggae
Rapture	Released: 14 March 2019; Label: Columbia; Formats: CD, digital download, streaming	1

=== Singles ===
==== As a lead artist ====
Title	Year	Peak chart positions				Certifications	Album
Title	Year	JAM Air.	SUR	UK	US R&B	Certifications	Album
"Burning"	2017	*	—	—	—		Non-album single
"Raggamuffin"	2018	*	—	—	—		Rapture
"Toast"	2018	*	—	70	47	BPI: Platinum; MC: Gold	Rapture
"Blazin"	2019	*	—	—	—		Rapture
"Throne"	2019	*	—	—	—		Rapture
"Rapture"	2019	*	—	—	—	BPI: Silver	Rapture
"Rapture (Remix)" (featuring Govana)	2019	*	—	—	—		Non-album singles
"W" (featuring Gunna)	2019	*	—	82	—	BPI: Silver	Non-album singles
"Lockdown"	2020	*	4	—	—		Gifted
"Pressure"	2020	*	—	—	—		Non-album singles
"Pressure (Remix)" (featuring Buju Banton)	2020	*	—	—	—		Non-album singles
"West Indies"	2021	*	—	—	—		Gifted
"Pull Up"	2022	*	—	—	—		Gifted
"Shine"	2022	*	—	—	—		Gifted
"Koffee"	2025	*	—	—	—		Non-album singles
"Ova so"	2026	3	—	—	—		Non-album singles
"—" denotes a recording that did not chart or was not released in that territory. "*" denotes that the chart did not exist at that time.

==== As a featured artist ====
Title	Year	Peak chart positions	Certifications	Album
Title	Year	UK	Certifications	Album
"Cyanide (Remix)" (Daniel Caesar featuring Koffee)	2019	—		Non-album single
"Repeat" (J Hus featuring Koffee)	2020	21	BPI: Silver	Big Conspiracy
"Gimme" (Sam Smith featuring Jessie Reyez and Koffee)	2023	60		Gloria
"Slow Burner" (Interplanetary Criminal featuring Koffee)	2025	31		Non-album singles
"Send Shots" (Rudimental featuring Original Koffee and Winny)	2026	—		Non-album singles
"—" denotes a recording that did not chart or was not released in that territory.

=== Other guest appearances ===
Year	Song	Other performer(s)	Album
2020	"Don't Walk Away"	John Legend	Bigger Love
2021	"The Harder They Fall"	None	The Harder They Fall (The Motion Picture Soundtrack)
