= Gimme (Sam Smith, Koffee and Jessie Reyez song) =

Single by Sam Smith, Koffee and Jessie Reyez

from the album Gloria
- Released: 11 January 2023
- Length: 2:52 (single); 2:49 (album version)
- Label: Capitol; EMI
- Songwriters: Sam Smith; James Napier; Mikkel S. Eriksen; Tor Erik Hermansen
- Producers: StarGate; Jimmy Napes; Anju Blaxx; Smith

Sam Smith singles chronology
"Night Before Christmas" (2022)	"Gimme" (2023)	"I'm Not Here to Make Friends" (2023)

Koffee singles chronology
"Winnaa" (2022)	"Gimme" (2023)

Jessie Reyez singles chronology
"Forever" (2022)	"Gimme" (2023)	"Jeans" (2023)

Music video
- "Gimme" on YouTube

"Gimme" is a song by the English singer-songwriter Sam Smith, Jamaican musician Koffee and Canadian singer-songwriter Jessie Reyez, who previously collaborated with Smith in their song "Promises". It was released on 11 January 2023, via Capitol Records as the third single from Smith's fourth studio album Gloria. It peaked at number 60 on the UK Singles Chart and number 63 on the IRMA chart.

== Background ==
According to Smith, the video and the song are based around an actual experience they had with Reyez while creating the track in Jamaica. "Me and Jessie were basically drunk, drinking whisky in Jamaica, two in the morning, running around absolutely wasted, like two girlfriends having a laugh."

== Composition and lyrics ==
"Gimme" is composed in the key of B-flat minor, and follows a midtempo of 104–108 beats per minute. Smith, Koffee, and Reyez perform with a vocal range of A-flat_{3} to B-flat_{4}.

The lyrics of the song allude to sexual themes, mainly the chorus. During an interview, Smith elaborates on the song's erotic themes; "I'm a sexual person," Smith states, "I like sex. It's something I'm teaching myself to not be ashamed of."

== Critical reception ==
Madison Phipps of Rolling Stone describes it as a sexual track; "with Reyez backing Smith on the thumping, repetitive chorus, the pair are lost in their own lust. 'Come over yah so may mi push yuh body to the limit,' Koffee raps, mirroring the dynamic of her collaborators." Emily Maskell of Attitude states that the track is "a new era of sound" for Smith, positing that "the unabashed neediness of desire and explicitness of queer longing leaves you thinking 'Gimme' will be a staple on the dancefloor for the start of 2023."

In a review of the album, Kitty Empire of The Observer wrote that the song is a demonstration of how "Smith's vocals drip with yearning" fit with pop music, appreciating the involvement of Koffee and Jessie Reyez. Emma Harrison of Clash also appreciated the trio, describing the song as "a glitter-infused dancehall stormer" with "effervescent vibes and a bold and intoxicating rhythm". Writing for Pitchfork, Jamieson Cox was less impressed by the collaboration, found it "anodyne at best and grating at worst".

== Music video ==
A music video for "Gimme" was released online on 13 January 2023. The video depicts the three artists in a club, dancing and performing suggestively with each other.

== Charts ==
Chart performance for "Gimme"
Chart (2023)	Peak position
Canada Hot 100 (Billboard)	75
Global 200 (Billboard)	167
Ireland (IRMA)	63
Japan Hot Overseas (Billboard Japan)	9
New Zealand Hot Singles (RMNZ)	11
Panama (Monitor Latino)	19
South Korea Download (Circle)	108
Sweden Heatseeker (Sverigetopplistan)	3
Suriname (Nationale Top 40)	6
Switzerland (Schweizer Hitparade)	96
UK Singles (Official Charts)	60
UK Hip Hop/R&B (Official Charts)	35
