= I'm Not Here to Make Friends =

Single by Sam Smith

from the album Gloria
- Released: 27 January 2023
- Genre: Dance-pop; disco
- Length: 3:49 (album version); 3:14 (radio edit)
- Label: Capitol
- Songwriters: Sam Smith; Jessie Reyez; Mikkel S. Eriksen; Tor Erik Hermansen; Adam Wiles
- Producers: Sam Smith; Stargate; Calvin Harris

Sam Smith singles chronology
"Gimme" (2023)	"I'm Not Here to Make Friends" (2023)	"Vulgar" (2023)

Music video
- "I'm Not Here to Make Friends" on YouTube

"I'm Not Here to Make Friends" is a song by the English singer Sam Smith. It was released on 27 January 2023 by Capitol Records as the fourth single from Smith's 2023 studio album, Gloria. The song was produced by Calvin Harris, Stargate, and Smith, and features vocals by RuPaul and Jessie Reyez. Smith previously collaborated with Harris and Reyez on "Promises" in 2018.

== Background ==
Sam Smith announced through a social media post their fourth studio album Gloria, attached with the official cover art, on 17 October 2022 after the release of the album's lead single "Unholy".

The track was announced on 30 November 2022, via a clip on Smith's official social media platforms. In the clip, Smith is mouthing the lyrics to the song while clothed in a pashmina dress, but is slowly revealed to be solely wearing fishnets over underwear with exposed thighs.

== Critical reception ==
The track received mixed to positive reviews from critics. Jamieson Cox of Pitchfork described the song as "a whirlwind of grown-up lust that evokes George Michael... circa 'Fastlove' and 'Outside.'" Lindsay Zoladz of The New York Times describes the song as "sleek, glittery... [and] taps into the pop-disco revival ignited by artists like Dua Lipa and Jessie Ware, taking its shout-along hook from a common reality show refrain."

Alexis Petridis of The Guardian refers to the track as one of the highlights of Gloria, describing it as a "disco-fied" track about "finding a one-night stand on the dancefloor." Petridis later states that "elsewhere, their voice proves a problem. If you sing about loving yourself or flirtation in the same disconsolate tone that you sing about being abandoned by your recent ex-partner... it's going to have a levelling effect, making the material seem less varied."

=== Year-end lists ===
Select year-end rankings of "I'm Not Here to Make Friends"
Publication	List	Rank	Ref.
Billboard	The 100 Best Songs of 2023 (Staff Picks)	62	

== Music video ==
A music video for "I'm Not Here to Make Friends" was released on 27 January 2023. It was directed by Tanu Muino. The video starts with Smith, wearing an enormous pink coat designed by Japanese fashion designer Tomo Koizumi, arriving at Ashridge, Hertfordshire, by helicopter. Once inside, dancers and drag queens surround the singer for a series of routines, with Smith wearing different outfits for each routine. It received controversy online due to its suggestive nature.

The video was nominated at the 2023 UK Music Video Awards for Best Pop Video – UK.

== Charts ==
=== Weekly charts ===
Weekly chart performance for "I'm Not Here to Make Friends"
Chart (2023)	Peak position
Australia (ARIA)	40
Belgium (Ultratop 50 Flanders)	3
Belgium (Ultratop 50 Wallonia)	6
Canada Hot 100 (Billboard)	32
Canada AC (Billboard)	26
Canada CHR/Top 40 (Billboard)	18
Canada Hot AC (Billboard)	19
Croatia (HRT)	2
Czech Republic Airplay (ČNS IFPI)	9
France (SNEP)	178
Germany (GfK)	100
Global 200 (Billboard)	53
Hungary (Rádiós Top 40)	34
Hungary (Single Top 40)	30
Ireland (IRMA)	32
Japan Hot Overseas (Billboard Japan)	5
Lithuania (AGATA)	45
Netherlands (Dutch Top 40)	31
Netherlands (Single Top 100)	64
New Zealand Hot Singles (RMNZ)	2
Poland (Polish Airplay Top 100)	12
Portugal (AFP)	68
Russia Airplay (TopHit)	63
San Marino (SMRRTV Top 50)	7
Slovakia Airplay (ČNS IFPI)	52
South Korea (Circle)	144
Suriname (Nationale Top 40)	8
Sweden Heatseeker (Sverigetopplistan)	2
Switzerland (Schweizer Hitparade)	50
UK Singles (Official Charts)	23
US Billboard Hot 100	71
US Adult Pop Airplay (Billboard)	25
US Pop Airplay (Billboard)	24

=== Monthly charts ===
Monthly chart performance for "I'm Not Here to Make Friends"
Chart (2023)	Peak position
Russia Airplay (TopHit)	75
South Korea (Circle)	152

=== Year-end charts ===
Year-end chart performance for "I'm Not Here to Make Friends"
Chart (2023)	Position
Belgium (Ultratop 50 Flanders)	32
Belgium (Ultratop 50 Wallonia)	56

== Certifications ==
Certifications for "I'm Not Here to Make Friends"
Region	Certification	Certified units/sales
Australia (ARIA)	Gold	35,000^{‡}
Brazil (Pro-Música Brasil)	2× Platinum	80,000^{‡}
^{‡} Sales+streaming figures based on certification alone.

== Release history ==
Release history and formats for "I'm Not Here to Make Friends"
Region	Date	Format	Label	Ref.
Various	27 January 2023	Digital download; streaming	Capitol	
Italy	27 January 2023	Contemporary hit radio	Universal	
United States	30 January 2023	Adult contemporary radio	Capitol	
United States	31 January 2023	Contemporary hit radio	Capitol	
