= Unholy (Sam Smith and Kim Petras song) =

2022 single by Sam Smith and Kim Petras

Single by Sam Smith and Kim Petras

from the album Gloria
- Released: 22 September 2022
- Genre: Electropop; synth-pop; dance-pop; EDM
- Length: 2:36
- Label: Capitol; EMI
- Songwriters: Sam Smith; Kim Petras; James Napier; Ilya Salmanzadeh; Henry Walter; Blake Slatkin; Omer Fedi
- Producers: Sam Smith; Kim Petras; Ilya; Cirkut; Slatkin; Fedi; Jimmy Napes

Sam Smith singles chronology
"Love Me More" (2022)	"Unholy" (2022)	"Night Before Christmas" (2022)

Kim Petras singles chronology
"Coconuts" (2021)	"Unholy" (2022)	"If Jesus Was a Rockstar" (2022)

Music video
- "Unholy" on YouTube

"Unholy" is a song by the English singer Sam Smith and the German singer Kim Petras. It was released on 22 September 2022 through EMI Records and Capitol Records as the second single from Smith's fourth studio album Gloria (2023) and later added as a bonus track on Petras' debut studio album Feed the Beast (2023). It was teased by Smith on their TikTok account a month before its release and went viral due to its use in thirst trap-style videos. Produced by Ilya, Omer Fedi, Blake Slatkin, Jimmy Napes, and Cirkut and written by them alongside Smith and Petras, "Unholy" is a sexually charged electropop, dance-pop, and synth-pop song with choral and hyperpop influences. It uses the Phrygian dominant scale and its lyrics are about a family man who cheats on his wife at a strip club.

"Unholy" received mostly positive reception from critics, many of whom considered the song a standout from Gloria and praised its sound as catchy yet unusual, while others found the song less transgressive than it was intended to be and criticised Petras's verse. Its win for Best Pop Duo/Group Performance at the 65th Annual Grammy Awards made Petras the first openly transgender artist to win a major-category Grammy Award. "Unholy" topped the UK Singles Chart for four weeks and the Billboard Hot 100 for one week, making Smith and Petras the first openly non-binary and openly transgender solo artists, respectively, to have a number-one song on the latter chart. The song replaced Steve Lacy's track "Bad Habit" at number one on the Billboard Hot 100, making it the first time in the chart's history that two tracks by openly LGBTQ+ artists topped the chart consecutively. It also topped the charts in 18 other countries and the Billboard Global 200 chart, and became the sixteenth best-selling global single of 2023, earning 1.17 billion subscription streams equivalents globally according to the International Federation of the Phonographic Industry (IFPI).

The music video for "Unholy", directed by Italian-Canadian director Floria Sigismondi, depicts Smith and Petras performing at an erotic cabaret with burlesque dancers to a woman who follows her adulterous husband there. It features cameos from American drag queens Violet Chachki and Gottmik and gay pornographic actor Paddy O'Brian. "Unholy" was performed live by Smith on their 2023 headlining concert tour, Gloria the Tour, on an episode of Saturday Night Live, at the 65th Annual Grammy Awards–where Smith and Petras's Satanic performance caused controversy among American conservatives, who accused the artists of devil worship–and at the Brit Awards 2023.

== Background ==
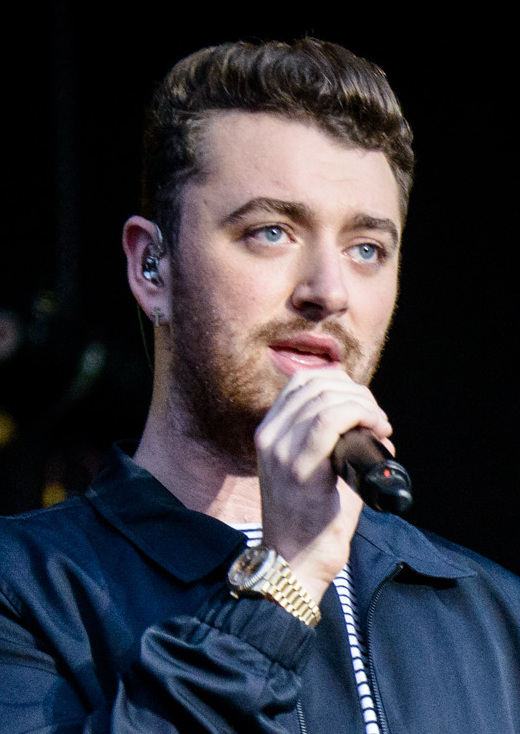
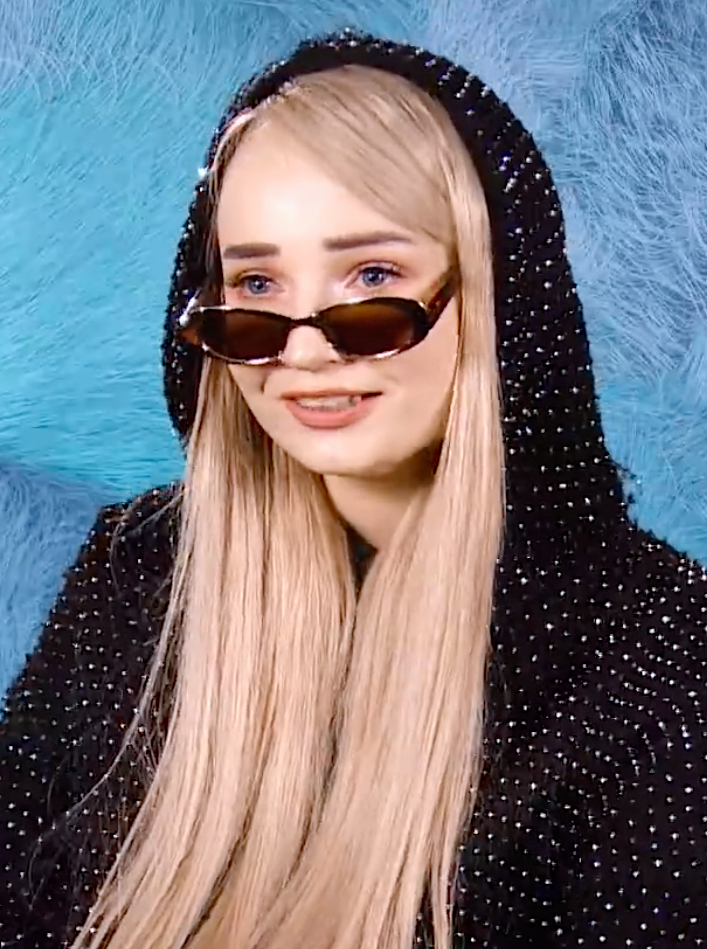
"Unholy" is performed by British singer Sam Smith (left) and German singer Kim Petras (right)

Prior to the release of "Unholy", British singer Sam Smith earned global recognition for ballads released throughout the 2010s as well as occasional features on songs by EDM producers, including on Naughty Boy's 2013 song "La La La" and on Disclosure's 2012 song "Latch". Kim Petras, a transgender German singer-songwriter, had been releasing pop and dance music, such as her 2017 single "I Don't Want It at All", since she independently released her debut single as a teenager.

Petras agreed to work with Smith on "Unholy" after being sent a rough draft of the song and the two first met at Capitol Studios in Los Angeles a week later. "Unholy" was recorded in Jamaica and produced by Ilya, Omer Fedi, Blake Slatkin, Jimmy Napes, and Cirkut, all of whom co-wrote the song with Smith and Petras. Napes had previously collaborated with Smith on their hit songs "Stay with Me", "Too Good at Goodbyes", "Latch", "Lay Me Down", and "Writing's on the Wall". It was first teased in mid-August through a clip on TikTok, which shows Smith and Petras dancing in a recording studio to a snippet of it that went viral and spurred a trend of sexually charged, thirst trap-style videos on the platform. Disclosure also teased the song, playing their remix of it in live sets. On 25 August, Smith announced the track's title and a pre-save link. On 22 September 2022, it premiered on BBC Radio 1 and was released as a single through EMI Records and Capitol Records. It was included on their fourth studio album, Gloria, which was released on 27 January 2023.

== Composition ==
A sexually charged and campy electropop, synth-pop, and dance-pop song, "Unholy" marked a return to EDM and a shift from sentimental ballads to dance music for Smith. It is in the key of F♯ minor (in the C♯ Phrygian dominant mode), giving a sense of Indian and Arabic music. It features Gregorian choir-like vocals, a "grinding" bassline, a string section, and metallic hyperpop-style synths and percussion popularized by British producer Sophie and the record label PC Music.

Its lyrics are about an adulterous heterosexual family man who goes to a strip club behind his wife's back to have sex. Smith described it as being about "liberating oneself from the clutches of others' secrets". In its hook, Smith sings, "Mummy don't know Daddy's getting hot/At the Body Shop/Doing something unholy"—referencing the Body Shop, the first all-nude strip club on the Sunset Strip in Hollywood—accompanied by an "oh-wee-oh-wee-oh" chant popularized by the winged monkeys from the 1939 film The Wizard of Oz. Petras's verse features braggadocio lyrics and sees her asking her lover to buy her luxury clothing. Chris Molanphy of Slate remarked upon the song's "sinister edge" and "high-camp energy" and compared it to "early-2010s peak-EDM era" pop music by artists such as Avicii and Kesha. Neil McCormick of The Telegraph described it as "a cross between a Brecht & Weill cabaret showstopper and a Pet Shop Boys electro stomp".

== Critical reception and accolades ==
For The New York Times, Lindsey Zoladz wrote that "Unholy" "sounds like the most fun [Smith has] ever had on a song". In a review of Gloria, Helen Brown of The Independent called "Unholy" the "stand-out banger" of the album, while Elly Watson of DIY picked it as an "undoubted standout" from the album, where, according to her, its "catchy melodies" were "elsewhere untouchable". The Sydney Morning Herald's Annabel Ross called it "promising" compared to other "inoffensive" songs on the album. For Variety, Jem Aswad wrote that "Unholy" was "one of the most musically innovative and unusual songs in years" to top the Billboard Hot 100. It was praised as an "inescapably catchy" "masterpiece of oversexualised nonsense" that "leaves everything else [on Gloria] feeling rather grey" by the Evening Standard's David Smyth. Lauren Murphy of The Irish Times called it a "musical banger... that booms, clatters and pings in all the right places", while AllMusic's Andy Kellman called the song "[Smith's] most distinctive dance-pop song since 'Latch'" and "without doubt anomalous in Smith's songbook".

Slant's Paul Attard described "Unholy" as the "towering centerpiece" of Gloria with lyrics that were "a little too cutesy to ever feel as truly transgressive as the music itself". Vulture's Jason P. Frank wrote that it was "a difficult song to get excited about" and "impressively un-tantalizing, the most basic kind of infraction", also asking, "Is this truly the best gender transgression we have to offer right now?" Slate's Chris Molanphy wrote that "Unholy" was "serviceable radio fodder" that was "almost conventional in its adherence to Top 40 trends" and that he "waver[ed] between delight and annoyance at [the song's] hook". For Pitchfork, Jamieson Cox wrote that "Unholy" "sound[ed] worse in an album-length context" and that "its transgressive glee scann[ed] as shallow and theatrical up against more grounded, mature material" on Gloria. Kyndall Cunningham, writing for The Daily Beast, stated that she "vehemently disliked" the song, which she referred to as "a little too intense and, conversely, unserious" with an "unbearably cheesy" opening line, before hearing it on Gloria, where "the intensity of the track finally made sense in [her] ears" after hearing its transition from "Perfect", the previous song on the album.

BuzzFeed News's Alessa Dominguez commended the song's "zany originality" compared to the rest of Gloria, which she called "uneven". Petras's verse was praised by Dominguez, who wrote that she "plays her sugar baby role to perfection", though it was called "trite" by Mark Richardson of The Wall Street Journal and "unimpressive" by Riley Moquin of The Line of Best Fit.

At the 65th Annual Grammy Awards, Petras and Smith also won the Best Pop Duo/Group Performance award for "Unholy", making Petras the first openly transgender artist to win a major-category Grammy Award and the first openly transgender woman singer to win a Grammy Award. During her acceptance speech, Petras thanked "all the incredible transgender legends performing who kicked these doors open", also thanking Sophie and Madonna. It marked Smith's first award since 2015 and Petras's first award overall. It was also nominated for the Brit Award for Song of the Year at the Brit Awards 2023, Smith's fourth nomination in the category and Petras' first Brit nomination in any category. At the 2023 MTV Video Music Awards, was nominated for Video of the Year, Song of the Year, Best Visual Effects, Best Direction and Best Choreography. "Unholy" was listed as one of the best songs of 2022 by Rolling Stone, Billboard, Time, Associated Press, and USA Today.

== Commercial performance ==
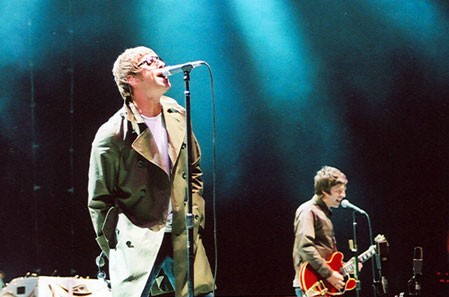
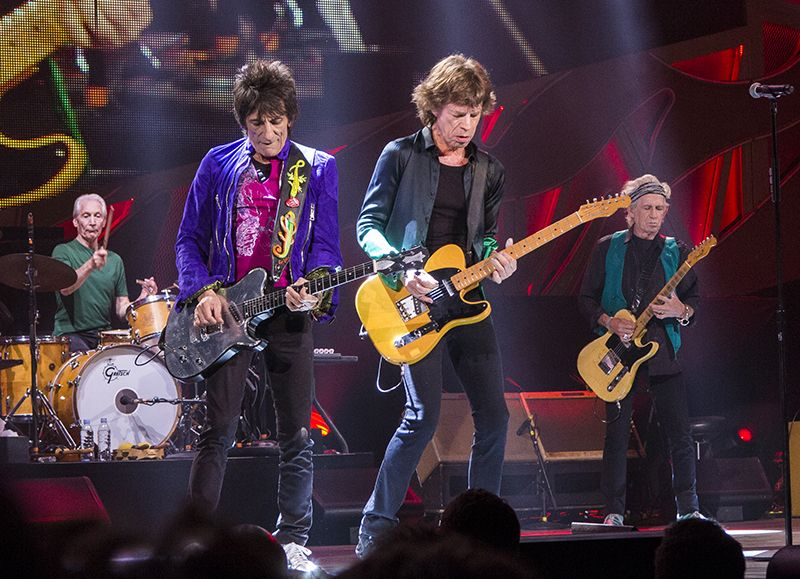
"Unholy" topping the UK Singles Chart gave Smith their eighth number-one and tied them with Oasis (top) and the Rolling Stones (bottom) on the list of artists with the most number-one singles in the UK.

"Unholy" entered atop the UK Singles Chart on 30 September 2022, becoming Smith's eighth UK number-one to date—tying them with Oasis and the Rolling Stones on the list of artists with the most number-one singles in the UK—and Petras's first, having racked up 5.9 million streams in the UK in its first week. It spent a total of four weeks at the top of the chart. The song also debuted at number one on the ARIA Singles Chart, making it Smith's second number-one single in Australia and Petras's first. It also topped the charts in Singapore, New Zealand, Australia, Bulgaria, Canada, Greece, Ireland, Hungary, Lithuania, Malaysia, Netherlands, and Slovakia.

In the United States, the song debuted at number three on the Billboard Hot 100 for the chart issue dated 8 October 2022. It earned Petras her first career entry on the chart. In its fourth week, it reached number one, becoming the first song from either artist to reach the top of the charts and Smith's highest-charting single, surpassing 2014's "Stay With Me", which peaked at number two. Petras and Smith became the first openly transgender and openly non-binary soloists, respectively, to reach number one on the chart. It also became the first Capitol Records single to top the chart since Lewis Capaldi's song "Someone You Loved" did in 2019 and the first EMI Records single to top the chart since British band EMF's song "Unbelievable" did in 1991. The collaboration tallied 25.3 million streams, 21.5 million radio airplay audience impressions and 19,000 downloads sold. It was also certified double platinum by the Recording Industry Association of America (RIAA) in March 2023. The song surpassed one billion streams on Spotify on 3 April 2023, making it a part of the platform's Billions Club and becoming Smith's fifth song, after "Stay With Me", "I'm Not the Only One", "Too Good at Goodbyes", and "Dancing With a Stranger" (featuring Normani), and Petras's first song to reach the milestone. "Unholy" also spent four weeks atop both the Billboard Global 200 and the Billboard Global Excl. US charts.

== Music video ==
The music video for "Unholy" depicts, from top to bottom: A man putting a coat on his wife after they exit a car; Smith dancing with androgynous backup dancers; Petras in a heart-shaped ring; and the video's cast, including the wife, taking a bow next to the man

The music video for "Unholy" was released on 30 September 2022. Inspired by A Clockwork Orange and Bob Fosse, it was directed by Floria Sigismondi and choreographed by the French dance collective (La)Horde. The video opens on a man, played by Henry Davis, opening a car door for his wife (Maren Fidje Bjørneseth), who exits and is given a coat by the man after she starts shivering. The two part ways as she enters a strange building and looks at a condom-themed invitation to a club called the Body Shop. Her husband enters the club, which is disguised as an auto shop but is actually a sex club and cabaret for which Smith, who wears a leather harness and is accompanied by androgynous burlesque dancers, is the MC. Drag queens Violet Chachki and Gottmik, both of whom were contestants on RuPaul's Drag Race, and pole-dancing strippers also appear at the club, along with gay pornographic star Paddy O'Brian. Petras soon arrives onstage in a heart-shaped ring and dances atop a car. The man is brought onto the stage before his wife arrives at the club to find him laid out in front of a suspended car with the words "liar", "cheat", and "fumier"—the French word for "shit"—spray painted on it. The woman walks down an aisle and gets on stage, taking off her wig and coat to reveal that she was part of the cast all along before taking a bow.

== Live performances, remixes, and cover versions ==
Smith and Petras performed "Unholy" live upon its release on 22 September 2022 for BBC Radio 1. The two gave their first public live performance of "Unholy" at the iHeartRadio Music Festival in Las Vegas the day after its release. The two also performed the song at the Jingle Bell Ball in December 2022. In January 2023, Smith was the musical guest on a season 48 episode of Saturday Night Live hosted by actress Aubrey Plaza the week before the release of Gloria, where they performed "Unholy" in a top hat with devil horns and a large, pink, and ruffled dress designed by Tomo Koizumi that revealed Petras sitting inside of it; the performance also featured hooded dancers. Michael Cragg of The Face wrote that the performance "felt exciting" as "an emblem of Smith's journey from purveyor of middle England Marks & Spencers music ... to something, perhaps, more genuinely groundbreaking." They also performed the song live at the 65th Annual Grammy Awards in February 2023, where they were introduced by Madonna. The Satanic performance showed Smith in red leather clothing and a top hat with horns, surrounded by pyrotechnics and backup dancers dressed similarly to Samara Morgan from the 2002 horror film The Ring, as well as Petras dancing in a cage. According to Petras, it was inspired by the two artists feeling excluded from religion. American conservative politicians and pundits, such as Ted Cruz, Marjorie Taylor Greene, and Matt Walsh, and online conspiracy theorists espoused the idea that the performance was a form of devil worship, with dozens of people filing complaints with the Federal Communications Commission (FCC) for that reason. Elon Musk tweeted that the performance had "end of days vibes". David Harris, a Church of Satan magister, called people offended over the performance "delicate snowflakes" and described it as "nothing particularly special". A week later, they gave a performance of the song at the Brit Awards 2023 in an industrial set with black leather mechanic outfits, which was delayed due to technical issues and received 106 complaints to Ofcom. As of 2023, "Unholy" was additionally part of the setlist for Smith's headlining 2023 concert tour, Gloria the Tour.

After teasing their remix of "Unholy" in August 2022, Disclosure's house remix of the song was released in October of that year. Remixes by Dxrk ダーク and Acraze followed. An acid house remix of "Unholy" by David Guetta and a nu metal remix of the song by English rock duo Nova Twins were both released in December 2022. An acoustic version of the song was performed by American singer Charlie Puth for SiriusXM to promote his studio album, Charlie, in October 2022. English singer Anne-Marie and American singer Lizzo both performed "Unholy" for their BBC Radio 1 Live Lounge performances in November 2022 and February 2023, respectively, with Anne-Marie's performance including significant lyrical changes to the song. Lizzo's performance included a live band and a 30-second-long flute solo from her; Justin Curto of Vulture stated that her cover was "better" and "more soulful" than the original.

== Track listing ==
Digital download/streaming

1. "Unholy" – 2:36

Digital and streaming EP

1. "Unholy" – 2:36
2. "Unholy" (Disclosure Remix) – 3:54
3. "Unholy" (Dxrk ダーク Remix) – 2:09
4. "Unholy" (Acraze Remix) – 2:56
5. "Unholy" (Orchestral Version) – 2:46
6. "Unholy" (Live Version) – 2:38
7. "Unholy" (Instrumental) – 2:37

Digital download/streaming (Nova Twins Remix)

1. "Unholy" (Nova Twins Remix) – 2:58

Digital download/streaming (David Guetta Acid Remix)

1. "Unholy" (David Guetta Acid Remix) – 2:50

Digital download/streaming (Sped up remix)

1. "Unholy" (Sped Up Remix) – 2:16

== Credits and personnel ==
Credits adapted from AllMusic.

- Sam Smith – vocals, background vocals, production, composition
- Kim Petras – vocals, composition
- James Napier – background vocals, production, composition
- Ilya Salmanzadeh – background vocals, production, composition
- Henry Walter – background vocals, production, composition
- Omer Fedi – production, composition
- Blake Slatkin – production, composition
- Simon Hale – arranging
- Serban Ghenea – mixing
- Bryce Bordone – mixing assistant
- Lewis Hopkin – mastering
- Gordon Davidson – engineering
- Gus Pirelli – engineering
- Freddie Light – re-recording engineering
- George Oulton – re-recording engineering
- Ian Burdge – cello
- Vicky Matthews – cello
- Tony Woollard – cello
- Chris Worsey – cello
- Chris Laurence – double bass
- Stacey Watton – double bass
- Reiad Chibah – viola
- Jenny Lewisohn – viola
- John Metcalfe – viola
- Andrew Parker – viola
- Adrian Smith – viola
- Natalia Bonner – violin
- Charlie Brown – violin
- Alison Dods – violin
- Louisa Fuller – violin
- Richard George – violin
- Marianne Haynes – violin
- Ian Humphries – violin
- Charis Jenson – violin
- Patrick Kiernan – violin
- Perry Montague-Mason – violin
- Steve Morris – violin
- Everton Nelson – violin
- Lucy Wilkins – violin
- Warren Zielinski – violin

== Charts ==
=== Weekly charts ===
Weekly chart performance for "Unholy"
Chart (2022–2023)	Peak position
Argentina Hot 100 (Billboard)	69
Australia (ARIA)	1
Austria (Ö3 Austria Top 40)	1
Belarus Airplay (TopHit)	29
Belgium (Ultratop 50 Flanders)	6
Belgium (Ultratop 50 Wallonia)	1
Brazil (Billboard)	7
Bulgaria Airplay (PROPHON)	1
Canada Hot 100 (Billboard)	1
Canada CHR/Top 40 (Billboard)	2
Canada Hot AC (Billboard)	3
CIS Airplay (TopHit)	16
Costa Rica (FONOTICA)	12
Croatia (Billboard)	4
Croatia International Airplay (Top lista)	2
Czech Republic Singles Digital (ČNS IFPI)	2
Denmark (Tracklisten)	3
Ecuador (National-Report)	8
Estonia Airplay (TopHit)	5
Finland (Suomen virallinen lista)	3
France (SNEP)	5
Germany (GfK)	2
Global 200 (Billboard)	1
Greece International (IFPI)	1
Hungary (Rádiós Top 40)	2
Hungary (Dance Top 40)	14
Hungary (Single Top 40)	2
Hungary (Stream Top 40)	1
Iceland (Tónlistinn)	2
India International (IMI)	1
Indonesia (Billboard)	10
Ireland (IRMA)	1
Israel International Airplay (Media Forest)	1
Italy (FIMI)	14
Japan Hot Overseas (Billboard Japan)	5
Lebanon (Lebanese Top 20)	2
Latvia Airplay (LaIPA)	15
Latvia Streaming (LaIPA)	2
Lithuania (AGATA)	1
Lithuania Airplay (TopHit)	1
Luxembourg (Billboard)	1
Malaysia (Billboard)	3
Malaysia International (RIM)	1
MENA (IFPI)	6
Moldova Airplay (TopHit)	3
Netherlands (Dutch Top 40)	2
Netherlands (Single Top 100)	1
New Zealand (Recorded Music NZ)	1
Nigeria (TurnTable Top 100)	29
Norway (VG-lista)	2
Poland Airplay (ZPAV)	8
Poland (Polish Streaming Top 100)	7
Philippines (Billboard)	5
Portugal (AFP)	2
Puerto Rico (Monitor Latino)	20
Romania (Billboard)	2
Romania (UPFR)	1
Romania Airplay (Media Forest)	1
Romania TV Airplay (Media Forest)	1
San Marino (SMRTV Top 50)	13
Singapore (RIAS)	1
Slovakia Airplay (ČNS IFPI)	12
Slovakia (Singles Digitál Top 100)	1
South Africa Streaming (TOSAC)	4
South Korea (Circle)	20
Spain (Promusicae)	35
Suriname (Nationale Top 40)	9
Sweden (Sverigetopplistan)	4
Switzerland (Schweizer Hitparade)	2
Turkey International Airplay (Radiomonitor Türkiye)	1
UK Singles (Official Charts)	1
US Billboard Hot 100	1
US Adult Contemporary (Billboard)	19
US Adult Pop Airplay (Billboard)	1
US Dance Airplay (Billboard)	1
US Pop Airplay (Billboard)	1
US Rhythmic Airplay (Billboard)	16
Venezuela Airplay (Record Report)	31
Vietnam (Vietnam Hot 100)	19

=== Monthly charts ===
Monthly chart performance for "Unholy"
Chart (2022–2023)	Position
Belarus Airplay (TopHit)	33
Brazil Streaming (Pro-Música Brasil)	8
CIS Airplay (TopHit)	21
Czech Republic (Singles Digitál – Top 100)	3
Estonia Airplay (TopHit)	9
Lithuania Airplay (TopHit)	25
Moldova Airplay (TopHit)	4
Romania Airplay (TopHit)	1
Slovakia (Rádio – Top 100)	14
Slovakia (Singles Digitál – Top 100)	1
South Korea (Circle)	21

=== Year-end charts ===
2022 year-end chart performance for "Unholy"
Chart (2022)	Position
Australia (ARIA)	19
Austria (Ö3 Austria Top 40)	48
Belgium (Ultratop Flanders)	100
Belgium (Ultratop Wallonia)	83
Brazil Streaming (Pro-Música Brasil)	151
Canada (Canadian Hot 100)	59
Denmark (Tracklisten)	72
France (SNEP)	128
Germany (Official German Charts)	43
Global 200 (Billboard)	98
Hungary (Single Top 40)	22
Hungary (Stream Top 40)	22
Latvia (EHR)	54
Lithuania (AGATA)	28
Netherlands (Dutch Top 40)	28
Netherlands (Single Top 100)	37
New Zealand (Recorded Music NZ)	34
Sweden (Sverigetopplistan)	85
Switzerland (Schweizer Hitparade)	38
UK Singles (OCC)	31
US Billboard Hot 100	98

2023 year-end chart performance for "Unholy"
Chart (2023)	Position
Australia (ARIA)	20
Austria (Ö3 Austria Top 40)	20
Belarus Airplay (TopHit)	53
Belgium (Ultratop 50 Flanders)	80
Belgium (Ultratop 50 Wallonia)	35
Brazil Streaming (Pro-Música Brasil)	136
Canada (Canadian Hot 100)	7
CIS Airplay (TopHit)	74
Denmark (Tracklisten)	94
Estonia Airplay (TopHit)	59
Germany (Official German Charts)	27
Global 200 (Billboard)	7
Global Singles (IFPI)	16
Hungary (Dance Top 40)	51
Hungary (Rádiós Top 40)	32
Lithuania Airplay (TopHit)	64
Moldova Airplay (TopHit)	5
Netherlands (Dutch Top 40)	73
Netherlands (Single Top 100)	64
New Zealand (Recorded Music NZ)	21
Poland (Polish Airplay Top 100)	89
Poland (Polish Streaming Top 100)	52
Romania Airplay (TopHit)	10
South Korea (Circle)	84
Switzerland (Schweizer Hitparade)	29
UK Singles (OCC)	34
US Billboard Hot 100	11
US Adult Top 40 (Billboard)	5
US Mainstream Top 40 (Billboard)	7

2025 year-end chart performance for "Unholy"
Chart (2025)	Position
Hungary (Rádiós Top 40)	52

== Certifications ==
Certifications for "Unholy"
Region	Certification	Certified units/sales
Australia (ARIA)	7× Platinum	490,000^{‡}
Austria (IFPI Austria)	3× Platinum	90,000^{‡}
Belgium (BRMA)	2× Platinum	80,000^{‡}
Brazil (Pro-Música Brasil)	2× Diamond	320,000^{‡}
Canada (Music Canada)	6× Platinum	480,000^{‡}
Denmark (IFPI Danmark)	Platinum	90,000^{‡}
France (SNEP)	Diamond	333,333^{‡}
Germany (BVMI)	Platinum	400,000^{‡}
Italy (FIMI)	2× Platinum	200,000^{‡}
New Zealand (RMNZ)	4× Platinum	120,000^{‡}
Poland (ZPAV)	Diamond	250,000^{‡}
Portugal (AFP)	3× Platinum	30,000^{‡}
Spain (Promusicae)	2× Platinum	120,000^{‡}
Switzerland (IFPI Switzerland)	2× Platinum	40,000^{‡}
United Kingdom (BPI)	2× Platinum	1,200,000^{‡}
United States (RIAA)	2× Platinum	2,000,000^{‡}
Streaming
Central America (CFC)	Platinum	7,000,000^{†}
Greece (IFPI Greece)	3× Platinum	6,000,000^{†}
Slovakia (ČNS IFPI)	Platinum	1,700,000
Sweden (GLF)	Platinum	8,000,000^{†}
Worldwide (IFPI)	—	1,170,000,000
^{‡} Sales+streaming figures based on certification alone.^{†} Streaming-only figures based on certification alone.

== Release history ==
Release history and formats for "Unholy"
Region	Date	Format	Version	Label	Ref.
Various	22 September 2022	Digital download; streaming	Original	Capitol; EMI	
Europe	27 September 2022	Digital download; streaming	Instrumental	Capitol; EMI	
Europe	27 September 2022	Digital download; streaming	Live	Capitol; EMI	
United States	27 September 2022	Contemporary hit radio	Original	Capitol	
Italy	30 September 2022	Radio airplay	Original	Universal	
Various	14 October 2022	Digital download; streaming	Disclosure remix	Capitol; EMI	
Various	17 October 2022	Digital download; streaming	Acraze remix	Capitol; EMI	
Various	4 November 2022	Digital download; streaming	Orchestral	Capitol; EMI	
Various	23 November 2022	Digital download; streaming	Dxrk ダーク remix	Capitol; EMI	
Various	23 November 2022	Digital download; streaming	7-track EP	Capitol; EMI	
Various	9 December 2022	Digital download; streaming	Nova Twins remix	Capitol; EMI	
Various	16 December 2022	Digital download; streaming	David Guetta acid remix	Capitol; EMI	
Various	23 December 2022	Digital download; streaming	Sped up remix	Capitol; EMI	

== See also ==
- List of Billboard Hot 100 number ones of 2022
- List of Billboard number-one dance songs of 2022
