= Gloria (Sam Smith album) =

Studio album by Sam Smith
- Released: 27 January 2023
- Genres: Pop; R&B
- Length: 33:03
- Label: Capitol
- Producers: Sam Smith; Jimmy Napes; StarGate; Ilya; Cirkut; Blake Slatkin; Calvin Harris; Omer Fedi; Anju Blaxx; David Odlum; Steve Mac; Loshendrix; Nesbitt Wesonga

Sam Smith chronology
| Love Goes: Live at Abbey Road Studios (2021) | Gloria (2023) | Hazel Eyes (2026) |

Singles from Gloria
- 1. "Love Me More" Released: 28 April 2022; 2. "Unholy" Released: 22 September 2022; 3. "Gimme" Released: 11 January 2023; 4. "I'm Not Here to Make Friends" Released: 27 January 2023; 5. "Lose You" Released: 12 May 2023

Gloria is the fourth studio album by the English singer-songwriter Sam Smith, released on 27 January 2023 through Capitol Records. The album serves as the follow-up to Love Goes (2020). Smith took creative control on the album, resulting in an increasingly provocative public image. Musically, Gloria is a pop album exploring themes of sex, lies, passion, self-expression, and imperfection.

Gloria received positive reviews from critics. It was supported by four singles: "Love Me More", "Unholy", a collaboration with Kim Petras, "Gimme", a collaboration with Koffee and Jessie Reyez, and "I'm Not Here to Make Friends". "Unholy" became the album's most successful single, topping the charts in Australia, Austria, Canada, Ireland, New Zealand, the United Kingdom, and the United States, becoming both Smith and Petras' first chart-topper in the latter. The song also won the award for Best Pop Duo/Group Performance at the 65th Annual Grammy Awards.

Commercially, Gloria debuted at number one in the United Kingdom, Australia, and Ireland, and has moved over 1.6 million album-equivalent units worldwide as of February 2023. To support the album, Smith embarked on Gloria the Tour, touring Europe, North America, Australia, and New Zealand, and additionally performed at the 2023 BRIT Awards, the 65th Annual Grammy Awards, and at the Royal Albert Hall.

== Background and recording ==
The album was recorded between Los Angeles, London and Jamaica, with Smith working with regular collaborators Jimmy Napes, Stargate and Ilya Salmanzadeh, as well as expecting further contributions from Loshendrix and Calvin Harris. Smith stated that the album "feels like a coming of age" and got them "through some dark times", and expressed a hope that it could also be a "beacon" for listeners. A press release called it a "personal revolution" for Smith, containing the "dazzling, sumptuous, sophisticated, unexpected and at times thrilling, edgy sound of Sam's creative heart today", as well as lyrics about "sex, lies, passion, self-expression, and imperfection".

== Promotion ==
Smith announced the album on their social media accounts on 17 October 2022, writing a note to their "dearest sailors", Smith's name for their fans, and sharing the cover art, a portrait of Smith with bleached hair wearing a golden earring of an anchor and pearl. Smith performed "Unholy" with Petras and "Gloria" with Sharon Stone as the musical guest on Saturday Night Live.

=== Singles ===
The first track to be released from the album was the single "Love Me More" on 28 April 2022. "Unholy", a collaboration with German singer Kim Petras, followed on 22 September 2022 and was promoted as the second single. It reached number one in several countries, including Australia, Canada, the UK and the US, as well as number one on the Billboard Global 200.

The track "Gimme" was released as the album's third single on 11 January 2023. It is a collaboration with Canadian singer-songwriter Jessie Reyez and Jamaican musician Koffee.

On 27 January 2023, the same day of the album's release, "I'm Not Here to Make Friends" was released as the fourth single.

==== Promotional singles ====
"Gloria" was released on 20 January 2023, one week before Gloria, as a promotional single.

=== Tour ===
On 21 October 2022, Smith announced Gloria the Tour via their Instagram account. The concert run began on 12 April 2023, in Sheffield. On 5 January 2023 the North American leg of the tour was announced.

== Critical reception ==
Professional ratings
Aggregate scores
| Source | Rating |
|---|---|
| AnyDecentMusic? | 6.0/10 |
| Metacritic | 68/100 |
Review scores
| Source | Rating |
| AllMusic | 3/5 stars |
| Clash | 7/10 |
| DIY | 3.5/5 stars |
| Evening Standard | 2/5 stars |
| The Guardian | 3/5 stars |
| The Irish Times | 3/5 stars |
| Metro | 2/5 stars |
| NME | 4/5 stars |
| Pitchfork | 6.2/10 |

Gloria received generally positive reviews. At Metacritic, which assigns a normalized rating out of 100 to reviews from professional publications, the album received an average score of 68 out of 100, based on 17 reviews. Aggregator AnyDecentMusic? gave it 6.0 out of 10, based on their assessment of the critical consensus. Maura Johnston of Rolling Stone called Gloria Smith's "deepest album yet" and described it as "a compact, steadily flowing collection of pop songs that showcase Smith's vocal versatility and personal growth" with lyrics about "Smith's experiences as a queer person who was raised Catholic" throughout. Gary Bushell of the Daily Express found the album to be "less gloomy than 2020's Love Goes, beautiful in places, and packed with surprises". Nick Levine of NME wrote that the album "really is the most surprising, satisfying and vital work of [Smith's] career" and at its heart is a "personal exploration of the broader queer experience that recalls George Michael's classic 1996 album Older".

Reviewing the album for The Guardian, Alexis Petridis was critical of the press release's claims of "experimentation", writing that while there are "hints of R&B, trap and disco" amongst the ballads and tracks similar to their "piano-led sound" of previous releases, "there's still something underwhelming about Gloria: the feeling that it's more of the same is more prevalent than it should be". David Smyth of the Evening Standard felt that "Unholy", a "masterpiece of oversexualised nonsense", "sticks out outrageously in the middle of this fourth album" as the rest of the tracks are "rather grey" by comparison. Smyth concluded that it is "a shame the songs, well crafted as they are, don't always match the self belief" Smith's lyrics have. Writing for The Observer, Kitty Empire denoted that the project does not fulfill its potential, as it was not pushed to the levels of Beyoncé's Renaissance, an album that deals with similar themes and sounds, pointing out that "something slinky [...] might have been more apposite on an album dedicated to fun – and liberation from the past" over tracks like "How to Cry", "Gloria" and "Who We Love".

Lindsay Zoladz of The New York Times found that Smith "puts aside ballads for more danceable tracks" and while the album "has moments of boldness", ultimately "its occasional lapses into generics keep it from feeling like a major personal statement". Writing for Pitchfork, Jamieson Cox opined that by this point of Smith's career, "an artist whose writing has long tended toward the bland and impersonal has grown into a vision and identity that can be compromised by mediocre features" like those of Jessie Reyez, with Cox calling "Gimme" and "Perfect" "anodyne at best and grating at worst", and Ed Sheeran, with Cox finding "Who We Love" to be "basically [...] Sheeran's 'Same Love'," with lyrics that lay out "trite scenes".

Emma Madden, reviewing for Metro, gave the album two out of five stars, writing that "sex and queerness do indeed feature in the album, but in a way that feels tacked on out of obligation [...] The references are extremely ham-fisted and obvious". Madden also felt that Gloria feels "slipshod and confused".

== Commercial performance ==
Gloria debuted at number one on the UK Albums Chart with 14,155 units, becoming the singer's third non-consecutive album to reach the top, joining In the Lonely Hour (2014) and The Thrill of It All (2017). In Australia, Gloria became the singer's first album to debut atop the ARIA Albums Chart and second number-one album overall.

The album debuted at number seven on the US Billboard 200 with 39,000 album-equivalent units, earning Smith their fourth US top 10 album.

As of February 2023, Gloria has moved over 1.6 million units worldwide.

== Track listing ==
Gloria standard edition track listing
| No. | Title | Writer(s) | Producer(s) | Length |
|---|---|---|---|---|
| 1. | "Love Me More" | Sam Smith; James Napier; Mikkel S. Eriksen; Tor Erik Hermansen | StarGate; Jimmy Napes; Smith | 3:23 |
| 2. | "No God" | Smith; Napier; Eriksen; Hermansen | StarGate; Napes; Smith | 3:17 |
| 3. | "Hurting Interlude" | | | 0:18 |
| 4. | "Lose You" | Smith; Napier; Ilya Salmanzadeh; Henry Walter; Blake Slatkin; Omer Fedi | Ilya; Cirkut; Slatkin; Fedi; Smith | 3:10 |
| 5. | "Perfect" (with Jessie Reyez) | Smith; Reyez; Napier; Eriksen; Hermansen | StarGate; Napes; Smith | 3:51 |
| 6. | "Unholy" (with Kim Petras) | Smith; Napier; Salmanzadeh; Walter; Slatkin; Fedi; Petras | Ilya; Cirkut; Slatkin; Fedi; Napes; Smith | 2:36 |
| 7. | "How to Cry" | Smith; Napier; Salmanzadeh; Walter; Slatkin; Fedi | Ilya; Slatkin; Fedi; Napes; Smith | 2:40 |
| 8. | "Six Shots" | Smith; Napier; Loshendrix; Nesbitt Wesonga; Ray Keys; Nami | Loshendrix; Wesonga; Napes; David Odlum; Smith | 2:30 |
| 9. | "Gimme" (with Koffee and Jessie Reyez) | Smith; Reyez; Napier; Eriksen; Hermansen | StarGate; Napes; Anju Blaxx; Smith | 2:49 |
| 10. | "Dorothy's Interlude" | | | 0:08 |
| 11. | "I'm Not Here to Make Friends" | Smith; Reyez; Napier; Eriksen; Hermansen | Calvin Harris; StarGate; Napes; Smith | 3:49 |
| 12. | "Gloria" | Smith; Foy Vance | Napes; Odlum; Smith | 1:50 |
| 13. | "Who We Love" (with Ed Sheeran) | Smith; Steve Mac; Sheeran; Johnny McDaid; Fred Gibson; Napier | Mac | 2:42 |
| Total length: | | | | 33:03 |

Gloria special edition bonus tracks
| No. | Title | Writer(s) | Producer(s) | Length |
|---|---|---|---|---|
| 14. | "Heavenly Sent" | Smith; Napier | Napes; Odlum; Smith | 2:49 |
| 15. | "Kissing You" | Des'ree Weekes; Tim Atack | Brendan Grieve; Odlum; Smith | 4:55 |
| Total length: | | | | 40:55 |

Gloria Apple Music edition bonus tracks
| No. | Title | Writer(s) | Length |
|---|---|---|---|
| 1. | "Stay with Me" (live from the Royal Albert Hall) | Smith; Napier; William Phillips; Tom Petty; Jeff Lynne | 4:13 |
| 2. | "I'm Not the Only One" (live from the Royal Albert Hall) | Smith; Napier | 3:54 |
| 3. | "Too Good at Goodbyes" (live from the Royal Albert Hall) | Smith; Napier; Eriksen; Hermansen | 4:31 |
| 4. | "How Do You Sleep?" (live from the Royal Albert Hall) | Smith; Savan Kotecha; Max Martin; Salmanzadeh | 3:55 |
| 5. | "Dancing with a Stranger" (live from the Royal Albert Hall) | Smith; Napier; Eriksen; Hermansen; Normani Hamilton | 4:10 |
| 6. | "Lose You" (live from the Royal Albert Hall) | Smith; Napier; Salmanzadeh; Walter; Slatkin; Fedi | 3:37 |
| 7. | "Unholy" (featuring Kim Petras; live from the Royal Albert Hall) | Smith; Napier; Salmanzadeh; Walter; Slatkin; Fedi; Petras | 3:59 |

Notes

- "Hurting Interlude" is taken from Gay and Proud, a 1970 film by Lilli Vincenz.
- "Dorothy's Interlude" contains samples of Divine from Pink Flamingos and "Over the Rainbow" by Judy Garland.

== Personnel ==
Musicians

- Sam Smith – vocals (1, 2, 4–9, 11–13), programming (3, 10), background vocals (6)
- Jodi Milliner – bass guitar (1, 2, 5, 7, 8)
- Ben Jones – guitar (1, 2, 5, 7, 8, 11)
- Reuben James – organ (1), Rhodes (2, 8), piano (5, 8)
- Jimmy Napes – programming (1, 2, 4, 5, 9), background vocals (6)
- Mikkel S. Eriksen – programming (1, 2, 5, 9)
- Tor Erik Hermansen – programming (1, 2, 5, 9)
- Alexis Marche Addison – additional vocals (1)
- Amber Clemons – additional vocals (1)
- Ant Clemons – additional vocals (1)
- Ashley Clemons – additional vocals (1)
- Cedric Jackson II – additional vocals (1)
- Daniel Cagan – additional vocals (1)
- Darien Champagne – additional vocals (1)
- Dylan Del-Olmo – additional vocals (1)
- Eric Bellinger – additional vocals (1)
- Jasmine "GoGo" Morrow – additional vocals (1)
- Jeremih – additional vocals (1)
- Julian Blake Ray – additional vocals (1)
- Julian Tabb – additional vocals (1)
- Jwan Anthony – additional vocals (1)
- Scott Carter – additional vocals (1)
- Shameka Marie – additional vocals (1)
- Solomon Fulton – additional vocals (1)
- Tayler Green – additional vocals (1)
- Ty Dolla Sign – additional vocals (1)
- Vanessa "Nettie" Wood – additional vocals (1)
- Jerry Wonda – bass guitar (1)
- Ladonna Young – background vocals (2, 8, 9), vocals (4)
- Vula Malinga – background vocals (2, 8, 9), vocals (4)
- Patrick Linton – background vocals (2, 9), vocals (4)
- Chris Worsey – cello (2, 3, 5, 6, 8, 11, 13)
- Ian Burdge – cello (2, 3, 5, 6, 8, 11, 13)
- Tony Woollard – cello (2, 3, 5, 6, 8, 11, 13)
- Vicky Matthews – cello (2, 3, 5, 6, 8, 11, 13)
- Chris Laurence – double bass (2, 3, 5, 6, 8, 11, 13)
- Stacey Watton – double bass (2, 3, 5, 6, 8, 11, 13)
- Earl Harvin – drums (2, 5, 8)
- Simon Hale – string arrangement (2, 3, 5, 6, 8, 11, 13)
- Adrian Smith – viola (2, 3, 5, 6, 8, 11, 13)
- Andy Parker – viola (2, 3, 5, 6, 8, 11, 13)
- Jenny Lewisohn – viola (2, 3, 5, 6, 8, 11, 13)
- John Metcalfe – viola (2, 3, 5, 6, 8, 11, 13)
- Reiad Chibah – viola (2, 3, 5, 6, 8, 11, 13)
- Charis Jenson – violin (2, 3, 5, 6, 8, 11, 13)
- Charlie Brown – violin (2, 3, 5, 6, 8, 11, 13)
- Everton Nelson – violin (2, 3, 5, 6, 8, 11, 13)
- Ian Humphries – violin (2, 3, 5, 6, 8, 11, 13)
- Louisa Fuller – violin (2, 3, 5, 6, 8, 11, 13)
- Lucy Wilkins – violin (2, 3, 5, 6, 8, 11, 13)
- Marianne Haynes – violin (2, 3, 5, 6, 8, 11, 13)
- Natalia Bonner – violin (2, 3, 5, 6, 8, 11, 13)
- Patrick Kiernan – violin (2, 3, 5, 6, 8, 11, 13)
- Perry Montague-Mason – violin (2, 3, 5, 6, 8, 11, 13)
- Richard George – violin (2, 3, 5, 6, 8, 11, 13)
- Steve Morris – violin (2, 3, 5, 6, 8, 11, 13)
- Warren Zielinski – violin (2, 3, 5, 6, 8, 11, 13)
- Blake Slatkin – programming (4)
- Cirkut – programming (4), background vocals (6)
- Ilya – programming (4), background vocals (6)
- Omer Fedi – programming (4); bass guitar, guitar (7)
- Nuno Bettencourt – guitar (5)
- Jessie Reyez – vocals (5, 9, 11)
- Kim Petras – vocals (6)
- Mike Hough – background vocals (8)
- Loshendrix – programming (8)
- Nez – programming (8)
- Koffee – vocals (9)
- Calvin Harris – programming (11)
- Alison Ponsford-Hill – background vocals (12)
- Andrew Tipple – background vocals (12)
- Caroline Fitzgerald – background vocals (12)
- Catriona Holsgrove – background vocals (12)
- Christina Gill – background vocals (12)
- Edmund Hastings – background vocals (12)
- Edward Ballard – background vocals (12)
- Edward Grint – background vocals (12)
- Elizabeth Poole – background vocals (12)
- George Cook – background vocals (12)
- Henry Moss – background vocals (12)
- Jacqueline Barron – background vocals (12)
- James Botcher – background vocals (12)
- James Davey – background vocals (12)
- Jenni Harper – background vocals (12)
- Jonathan Wood – background vocals (12)
- Judi Brown – background vocals (12)
- Ksynia Loeffler – background vocals (12)
- Lotte Betts-Dean – background vocals (12)
- Natalie Clifton Griffith – background vocals (12)
- Philip Brown – background vocals (12)
- Philippa Murray – background vocals (12)
- Robin Bailey – background vocals (12)
- Ruth Kiang – background vocals (12)
- Sara Davey – background vocals (12)
- Steve Trowell – background vocals (12)
- Vanessa Heine – background vocals (12)
- Victoria Meteyard – background vocals (12)
- London Voices – choir (12)
- Lucy Goddard – chorus master (12)
- Ben Parry – musical direction (12)
- Johnny McDaid – bass guitar, guitar (13)
- Chris Laws – drums (13)
- Steve Mac – keyboards (13)
- Ed Sheeran – vocals (13)

Technical

- Randy Merrill – mastering
- Kevin "KD" Davis – mixing (1)
- Steve Fitzmaurice – mixing (2, 3, 5, 8–11, 13)
- Serban Ghenea – mixing (4, 6, 7)
- David Odlum – mixing (12)
- Gus Pirelli – engineering (1, 2, 4–9, 11–13)
- Mikkel S. Eriksen – engineering (1, 2, 5, 9, 11)
- Gordon Davidson – engineering (2–6, 8, 11–13)
- Chris Laws – engineering (13)
- Dan Pursey – engineering (13)
- Freddie Light – additional engineering (2–6, 8, 11–13)
- George Oulton – additional engineering (2–6, 8, 11–13)
- Bryce Bordone – mixing assistance (4, 6, 7)
- Thomas Warren – engineering assistance (1)
- Ed Farrell – engineering assistance (2, 4–9, 11)
- Miles Wheway – engineering assistance (2–6, 8, 11, 13)
- Natalia Milanesi – engineering assistance (2–6, 8, 11, 13)
- Ira Grylack – engineering assistance (4, 6–8)
- Lance Powell – engineering assistance (8, 12)

== Charts ==
=== Weekly charts ===
Weekly chart performance for Gloria
| Chart (2023) | Peak position |
|---|---|
| Australian Albums (ARIA) | 1 |
| Austrian Albums (Ö3 Austria) | 8 |
| Belgian Albums (Ultratop Flanders) | 4 |
| Belgian Albums (Ultratop Wallonia) | 11 |
| Canadian Albums (Billboard) | 4 |
| Danish Albums (Hitlisten) | 14 |
| Dutch Albums (Album Top 100) | 2 |
| Finnish Albums (Suomen virallinen lista) | 11 |
| French Albums (SNEP) | 21 |
| German Albums (Offizielle Top 100) | 6 |
| Icelandic Albums (Tónlistinn) | 8 |
| Irish Albums (Official Charts) | 1 |
| Italian Albums (FIMI) | 20 |
| Japanese Digital Albums (Oricon) | 26 |
| Japanese Hot Albums (Billboard Japan) | 52 |
| Lithuanian Albums (AGATA) | 7 |
| New Zealand Albums (RMNZ) | 2 |
| Norwegian Albums (VG-lista) | 4 |
| Polish Albums (ZPAV) | 9 |
| Portuguese Albums (AFP) | 6 |
| Scottish Albums (Official Charts) | 1 |
| Spanish Albums (Promusicae) | 11 |
| Swedish Albums (Sverigetopplistan) | 6 |
| Swiss Albums (Schweizer Hitparade) | 2 |
| UK Albums (Official Charts) | 1 |
| US Billboard 200 | 7 |

=== Year-end charts ===
Year-end chart performance for Gloria
| Chart (2023) | Position |
|---|---|
| Belgian Albums (Ultratop Flanders) | 187 |
| French Albums (SNEP) | 120 |

== Certifications ==
Certifications for Gloria
| Region | Certification | Certified units/sales |
|---|---|---|
| Belgium (BRMA) | Gold | 10,000^{‡} |
| Canada (Music Canada) | Gold | 40,000^{‡} |
| France (SNEP) | Gold | 50,000^{‡} |
| Italy (FIMI) | Gold | 25,000^{‡} |
| New Zealand (RMNZ) | Gold | 7,500^{‡} |
| Norway (IFPI Norway) | Gold | 10,000^{‡} |
| Poland (ZPAV) | Platinum | 20,000^{‡} |
| United Kingdom (BPI) | Silver | 60,000^{‡} |
^{‡} Sales+streaming figures based on certification alone.

== Release history ==
Release history for Gloria
| Region | Date | Format | Label | Ref. |
|---|---|---|---|---|
| Various | 27 January 2023 | Cassette; CD; digital download; streaming; vinyl | Capitol | |
