= Houghton, Cambridgeshire =

Village in Cambridgeshire, England

Coordinates: 52.335°N 0.119°W

Houghton
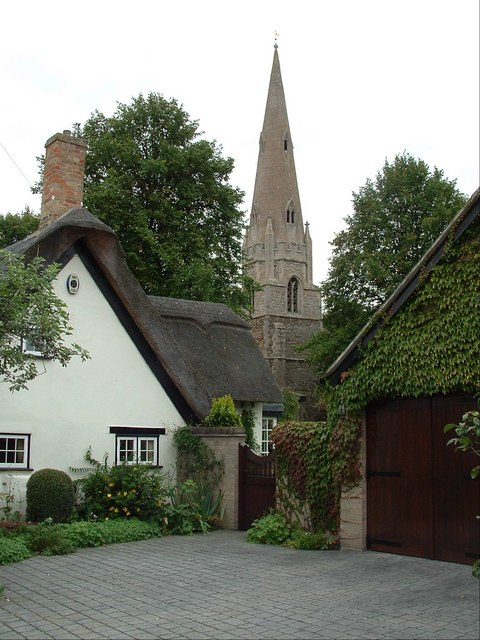

- Location within Cambridgeshire
- Population: 2,559 (2001); 1,817 (2011)
- OS grid reference: TL281724
- Civil parish: Houghton and Wyton
- District: Huntingdonshire
- Shire county: Cambridgeshire
- Region: East
- Country: England
- Sovereign state: United Kingdom
- Post town: HUNTINGDON
- Postcode district: PE28
- Dialling code: 01480
- Police: Cambridgeshire
- Fire: Cambridgeshire
- Ambulance: East of England
- UK Parliament: Huntingdon

Houghton /ˈhoʊtən/ is a village and former civil parish, now in the parish of Houghton and Wyton, in Cambridgeshire, England, approximately 3 miles (5 km) east of Huntingdon on the A1123 road, and south of RAF Wyton. It lies on the north bank of the River Great Ouse, by Houghton Mill.

It is within Huntingdonshire, a non-metropolitan district of Cambridgeshire and a historic county of England. It was named one of the "Best Places to Live in the East" by the Sunday Times in 2016.

== History ==
Houghton is mentioned in the Domesday Book and described as "Hoctune".

== Government ==
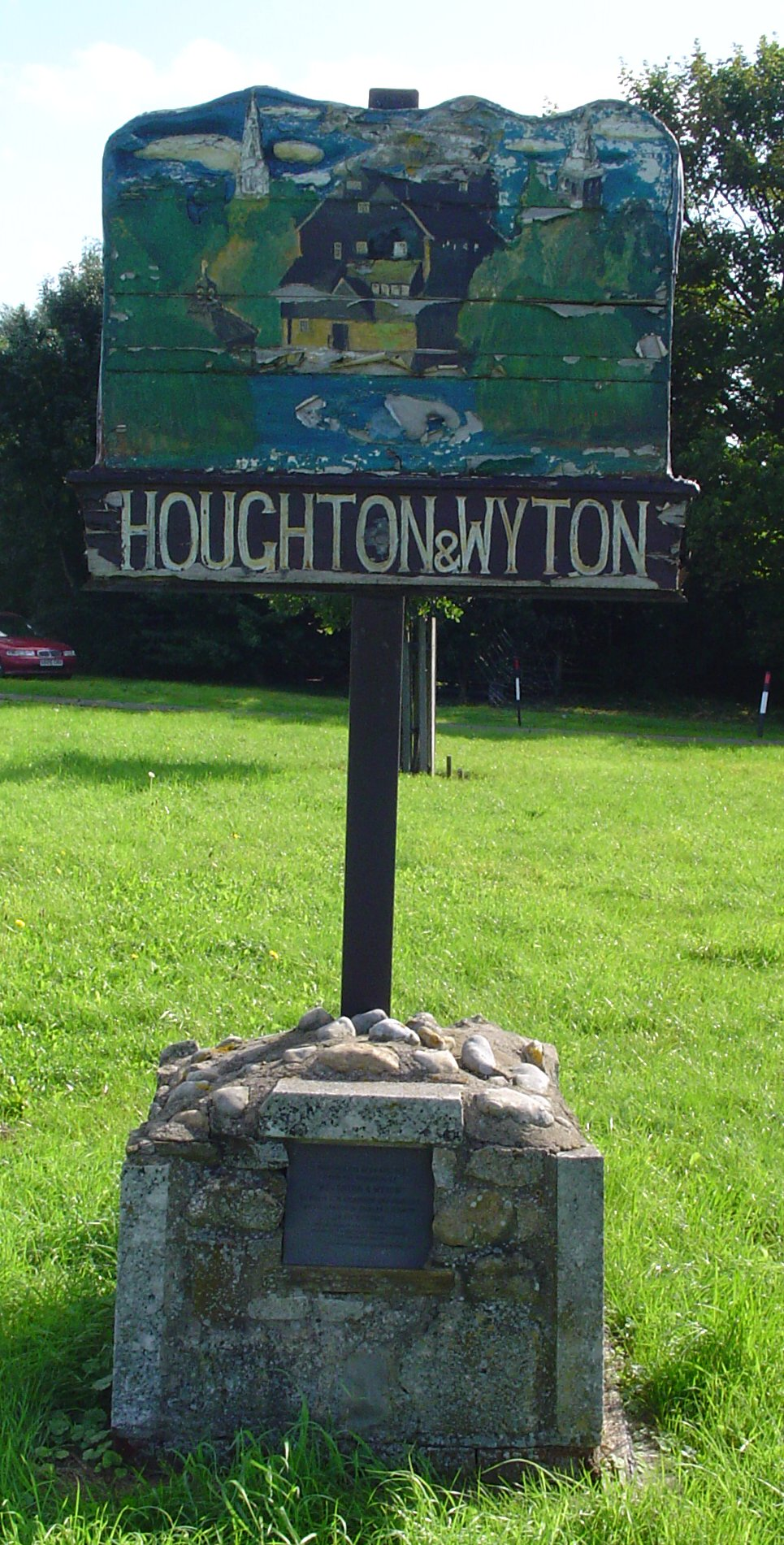
Village sign in Houghton & Wyton

Houghton is part of the civil parish of 'Houghton and Wyton', which has a parish council. The parish council is the lowest tier of government in England and is elected by the residents of the parish on the electoral roll. The parish council has nine councillors and meets approximately every two weeks through the year. In 1931 the parish of Houghton had a population of 321. On 1 April 1935 the parish of Houghton was abolished to form "Houghton and Wyton".

Houghton was in the historic and administrative county of Huntingdonshire until 1965. From 1965, the village was part of the new administrative county of Huntingdon and Peterborough. Then in 1974, following the Local Government Act 1972, Houghton became a part of the county of Cambridgeshire.

The second tier of local government is Huntingdonshire District Council which is a non-metropolitan district of Cambridgeshire and has its headquarters in Huntingdon. Huntingdonshire District Council has 52 councillors representing 29 district wards. Houghton is a part of the district ward of 'The Hemingfords' and is represented on the district council by two councillors. District councillors serve for four-year terms following elections to Huntingdonshire District Council.

For Houghton the highest tier of local government is Cambridgeshire County Council. The county council consists of 69 councillors representing 60 electoral divisions. Houghton is part of the electoral division of 'The Hemingfords and Fen Stanton', represented on the county council by one councillor.

At Westminster, Houghton is in the parliamentary constituency of Huntingdon. Houghton is represented in the House of Commons by Ben Obese-Jecty (Conservative), who succeeded Jonathan Djanogly (Conservative) in 2024. The previous MP John Major (Conservative) represented the constituency between 1983 and 2001.

== Demography ==
=== Population ===
In the period 1801 to 1901 the population of the separate parishes of Houghton and Wyton was recorded every ten years by the UK census. During this time the population was in the range of 467 (the lowest was in 1901) and 818 (the highest was in 1871).

From 1901, a census was taken every ten years with the exception of 1941 (due to the Second World War).

Parish	1911	1921	1931	1951	1961	1971	1981	1991	2001	2011
Houghton	350	315	321							
Wyton	169	323	445							
Houghton and Wyton	519	638	766	2,437	2,908	4,114	3,699	3,363	2,559	1,817

All population census figures from report Historic Census figures Cambridgeshire to 2011 by Cambridgeshire Insight.

The separate parishes of Houghton and Wyton were combined into a single parish in 1935. Part of this parish's area was separated as a new parish of Wyton on the Hill in 2010.

In 2011, the parish covered an area of 1,623 acres (657 hectares) and so the population density of Houghton and Wyton in 2011 was 716.5 persons per square mile (276.6 per square kilometre).

== Notable buildings ==
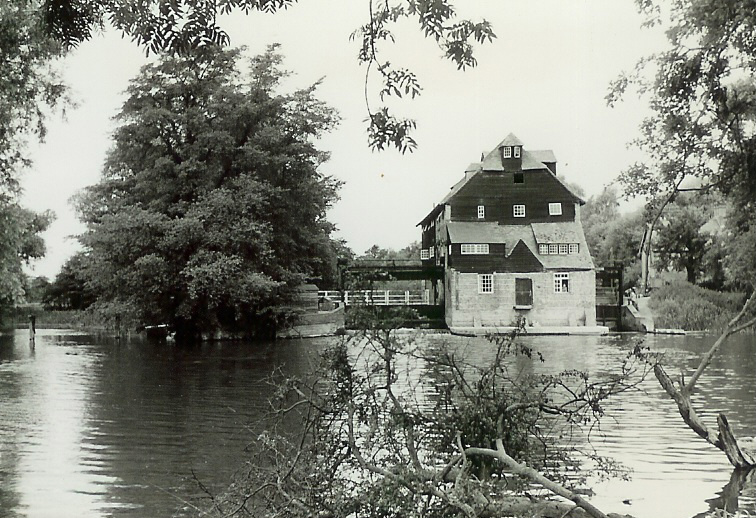
Houghton Mill in the 1960s

Houghton Mill is an old watermill owned by the National Trust that is used for demonstrating flour milling. It had previously been operated as a youth hostel.

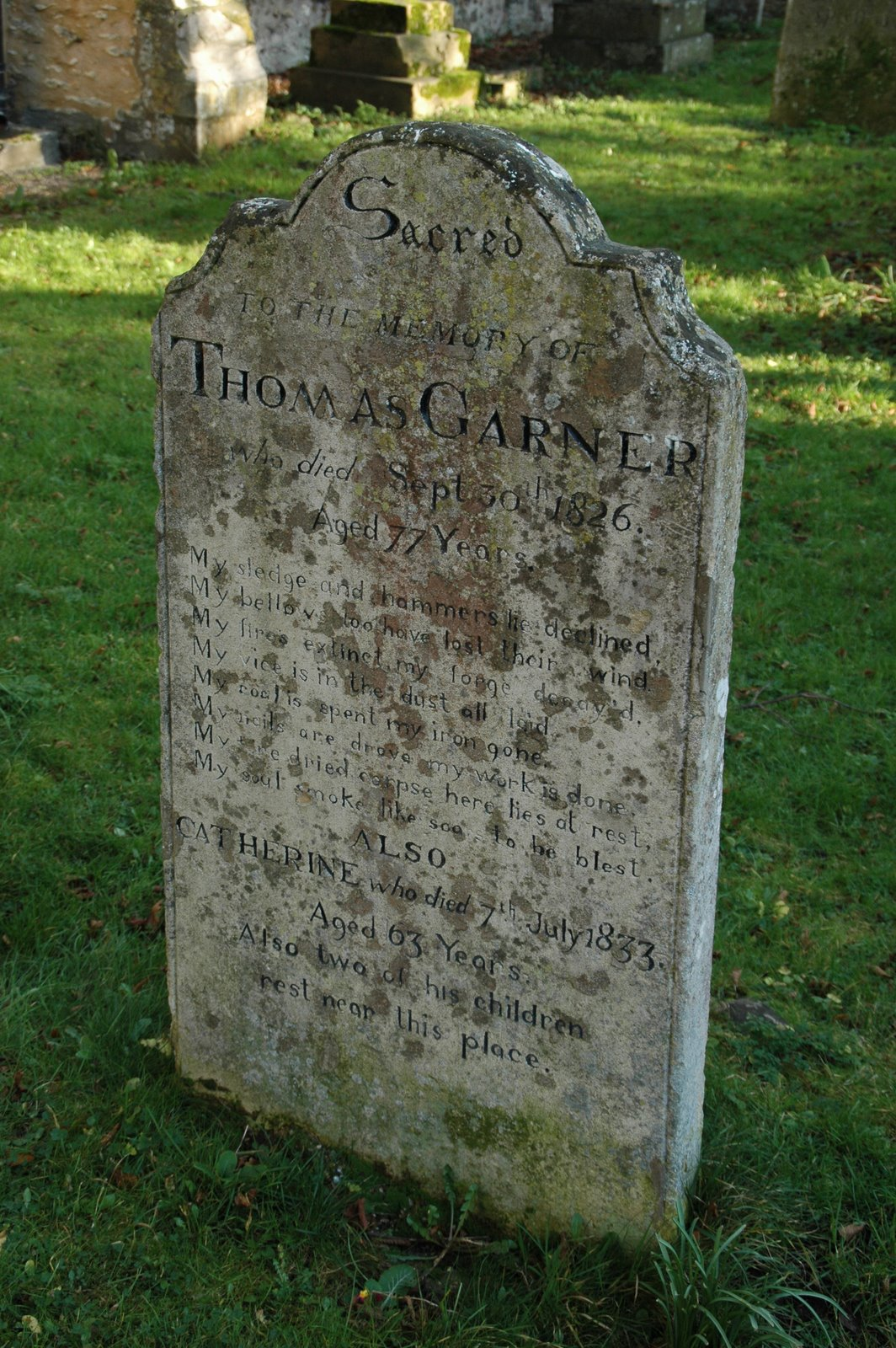
A gravestone for a village blacksmith with a poetic epitaph, in the churchyard of St Mary's, Houghton

Houghton's Church of England parish church dates from the Norman era and is dedicated to St Mary. It now serves as the church for the combined parish of Houghton and Wyton. Near the church sits a former United Reformed Church that has been converted into a residential retreat centre.

== Other places of interest ==
At the centre of the village is an area known as the village green, although it is completely paved. The centrepiece of the green is a thatched clock tower. Adjacent to the tower is a monumental bust of former village resident Potto Brown (1797–1871), a miller and nonconformist philanthropist. Also on the green are an old water pump and a traditional red telephone box.

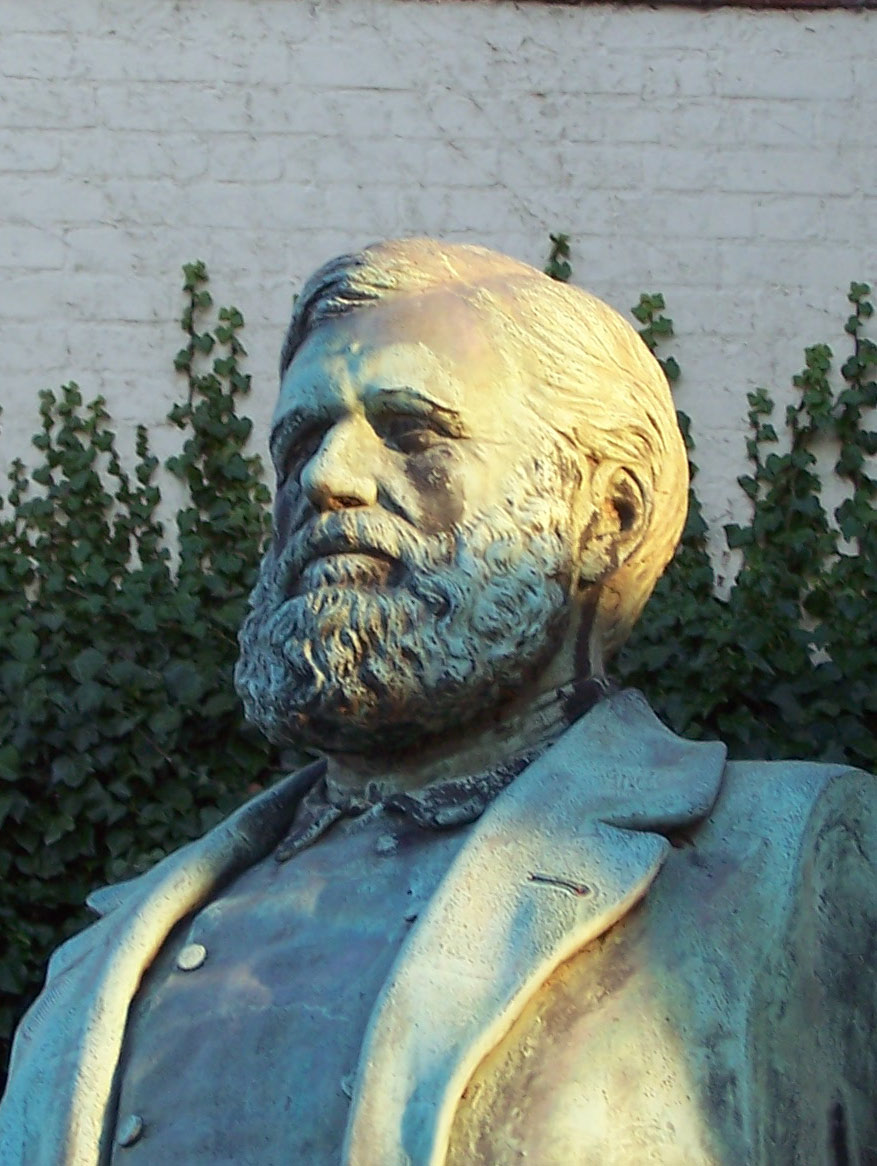
Statue of Potto Brown (1797–1871), miller and philanthropist

It is possible to walk from Houghton to Hemingford Abbots across the flood meadows, and to St Ives along the Thicket Path. There is a nature reserve (Wildlife Trust) along the Thicket Path known as Houghton Meadows ("Far Close") that shows markings of traditional ridge and furrow farming.

In the village centre there is a war memorial hall. On Houghton Hill there is a cemetery.

There used to be two veterinary poultry research centres, one on Houghton Hill and the other in "The Elms".

There are a number of old houses of interest, particularly in the village green and near the playing field. The playing field is used for football, tennis and cricket. On the field there is a bowling club, cricket pavilion, tennis courts, football pitch and a scout hut.

At the village green is the former home of artist Charles Whymper (1853–1941). He was a relative of Edward Whymper who, in 1865, led the first ascent of the Matterhorn; a model of the Matterhorn is in the garden and just visible from the green.

The disused railway line runs through Houghton near the river.

== Feast week ==
Every summer (normally the first fortnight of July) there is a week of community events, entitled "feast week". This has included a fun run, fayre and other sporting and fancy dress events.

== Education ==
The only school in the village is Houghton Primary School for children aged five to eleven. The school straddles the boundary between Houghton and Wyton. Children from the school normally feed into St Peter's School, Huntingdon, although others go to St Ivo Academy, Hinchingbrooke School, or Abbey College, Ramsey.

== Notable residents and people associated with Houghton ==
Captain John Leslie Green VC (1888–1916)

- Christopher Biden (c. 1789 – 1858) was an officer in the East India Company Mercantile Marine
- Potto Brown (1797–1871), miller and philanthropist
- George Christopher Burder MC (died 17 April 1945 in Germany) formerly of Wyton Rectory and son of Revd. Claud Vernon Burder and Mary Gabrielle Fielding Burder. He has been described by the museum in Geffen, Netherlands as the 'hero of Geffen'
- Charles Whymper (1853–1941), artist
- John Leslie Green who was one of the nine VCs of the First Day of the Somme during the First World War
- John Galbraith Graham, crossword compiler and former minister at St Mary's Church, Houghton
- David McCandless, author (attended Houghton primary school)

== See also ==
- List of places in Cambridgeshire
