= John Hunt (theologian) =

Scottish cleric, theologian and historian

John Hunt, D.D. (21 January 1827 – 12 April 1907) was a Scottish cleric, theologian and historian. He was known for his liberal views, and his work Religious Thought in England.

== Life ==
He was born in the Bridgend parish of Kinnoull, Perth, Scotland, and matriculated at University of St Andrews in 1847. He was ordained deacon in the Church of England in 1855, and priest 1857.

Hunt was curate of Deptford, Sunderland from 1855 to 1859; and in churches in and about London until 1877, when, on nomination of Dean Stanley, he was appointed vicar of Otford, in Kent.

Hunt was on the staff of The Contemporary Review from 1867 to 1877, and was a contributor to other periodicals. In theology he was liberal. He was created D.D. of the University of St Andrews in 1878.

== Works ==
Hunt was the author of:

- Poems from the German, London, 1852;
- Luther's Spiritual Songs translated, 1858;
- Essay on Pantheism, 1866, published at the St Ives Press by the Rev. William Lang; the later Pantheism and Christianity, 1884, was a revision;
- An incomplete edition of the poems of Robert Wild, 1870, with a historical and biographical preface, and a dedication in which Hunt refers to time as a curate in St Ives, Huntingdonshire;
- Religious Thought in England, 1870–78, 3 vols.;
- Contemporary Essays in Theology, 1873.

== Family ==
Hunt married E. Thorp, or Eliza Sheppard Meadows (born 1845). She wrote as "Spes" and was the author of Legends of St. Ives (1891). Her novel The Wards of Plotinus appeared in 1880, under the name "Mrs. John Hunt"; and a number of chapters in it were written by Hunt. She died in 1890.
