= James Sykes =

James Sykes may refer to:

- James Sykes (Continental Congress) (1725–1792), American lawyer and Continental Congressman
- James Sykes (governor) (1761–1822), American physician and Acting Governor of Delaware
- Rod Sykes (James Rodney Winter Sykes, born 1929), Canadian politician, mayor of Calgary, Alberta
- James Sykes (Canadian football) (born 1954), former CFL running back
- Jim Sykes (born 1950), American politician
- James Sykes (cricketer) (born 1992), Leicestershire County Cricket Club cricketer
