= All Saints Church, St Ives =

All Saints
- All Saints Parish Church, St Ives, Cambridgeshire
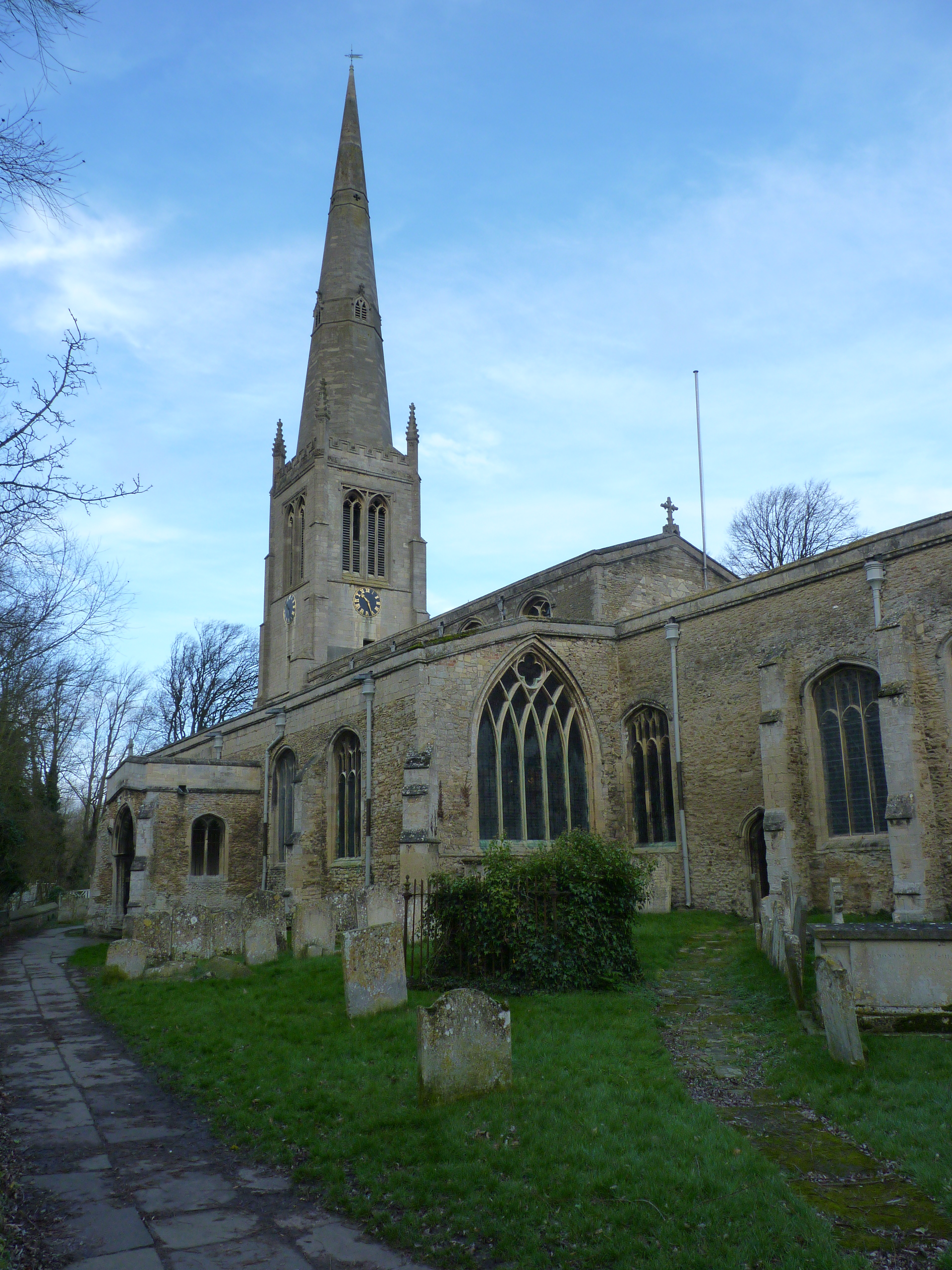
- All Saints
- 52.3266°N 0.0793°W
- Location: Church Street, St Ives, Cambridgeshire, PE27 6DG
- Country: England
- Denomination: Anglican

Architecture
- Style: Perpendicular Gothic
- Years built: 10th Century onwards

Administration
- Diocese: Diocese of Ely

Clergy
- Vicar: Vacant

All Saints is the parish church of St Ives in Cambridgeshire, England. The earliest recorded mention of the Parish Church of St Ives is in the Domesday Book, AD 1086, when it is stated that there was here a “priest and a church”. This original church would be small and probably of wood. A stone structure replaced the original wooden building around 1150. The church was then extensively rebuilt in the Perpendicular Gothic style between 1450 and 1470.

It is a Grade I listed parish church situated on the north bank of the River Great Ouse, to the west of the modern town centre. It serves as the Anglican parish church for the town and operates within the Anglo-Catholic tradition. The church stands on a gravel mound that was the focal point of the original Saxon settlement known as Slepe.

The building features an aisled nave, an aisleless chancel made of coarse rubble, and a west tower constructed of ashlar. A prominent, graceful spire caps the tower, reaching a total height of 151 feet. The spire has been destroyed and rebuilt multiple times due to unique historical incidents: In 1741 it was blown down during a severe gale and rebuilt in 1748. In 1879 it was rebuilt once again due to structural degradation, and in 1918: a military aeroplane crashed into the spire causing it to collapse into the nave roof. The spire and roof were fully restored by 1924.

The churchyard and building hold historical associations with Oliver Cromwell, who lived in the town and worshipped at the parish during the 1630s. An old vestry book contains the genuine signature of Oliver Cromwell from 1631, when he lived in the town as a parish overseer.
