= St Ives Corn Exchange =

Municipal building in St Ives, Cambridgeshire, England

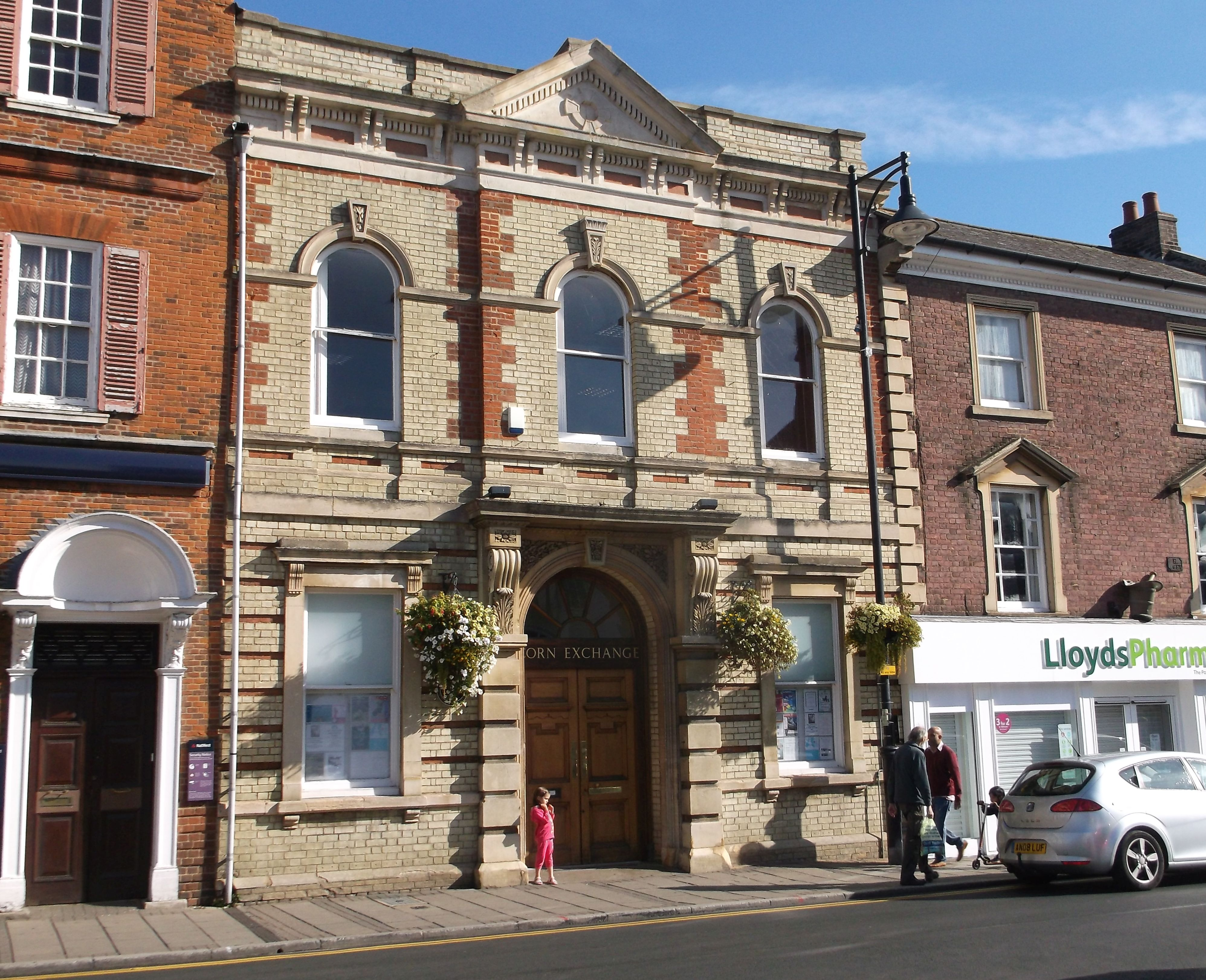
- St Ives Corn Exchange

- Shown in Cambridgeshire
- 52.3238°N 0.0735°W
- Location: The Pavement, St Ives

History
- Built: 1864

Site notes
- Architect: Robert Hutchinson
- Architectural style: Italianate style

Listed Building – Grade II
- Official name: The Corn Exchange
- Designated: 24 March 1972
- Reference no.: 1310012

The Corn Exchange is a commercial building on The Payment in St Ives, Cambridgeshire, England. The structure, which is currently used as an events venue, is a Grade II listed building.

== History ==
In the mid-19th century, a group of local businessmen formed a company known as the "St Ives Corn Exchange and Public Hall Company" to finance and commission a new corn exchange for the town.

The building was designed by Robert Hutchinson of Huntingdon in the Italianate style, built in yellow brick with red brick and stone dressings and was completed in 1864. The design involved a symmetrical main frontage of three bays facing onto The Pavement. The central bay, which was slightly projected forward, featured a doorway with a fanlight, an archivolt and a keystone, flanked by banded pilasters and brackets supporting a cornice. The other bays on the ground floor were fenestrated with sash windows with architraves, window cills and bracketed cornices, while the first floor was fenestrated by round headed windows with archivolts and keystones. At roof level, there was an entablature, a dentil cornice and a parapet, as well as a pediment over the central bay. Internally, the principal room was the Charter Hall which could accommodate at least 500 farmers and merchants.

The building was also used as an events venue from an early stage: regular functions included the Huntingdonshire Horticultural Show. However, the use of the building as a corn exchange declined significantly in the wake of the Great Depression of British Agriculture in the late 19th century. After the building was acquired by St Ives Borough Council in 1947, the company which had originally financed and commissioned it was wound up in 1950. Following local government organisation in 1974, ownership of the building passed to St Ives Town Council, but after a survey identified structural problems with the building, the town council decided to close it in 2001.

A campaign group, Action Corn Exchange, was formed to raise money for the restoration of the building in 2006. After the necessary money had been raised and the town council had agreed to carry out repairs, a new company, the Corn Exchange Community Interest Company, was formed to take over management of the building in December 2009.

Following extensive refurbishment work in the first half of 2010, the building was officially re-opened by the mayor, David Hodge, on 24 June 2010. Since then the building has hosted numerous organisations including drama and dance groups, exercise classes, University of the Third Age meetings, cinema performances and comedy nights.

== See also ==
- Corn exchanges in England
