= Paul Clammer =

English travel writer

Paul Clammer is an English travel writer best known for books on challenging destinations including Haiti, Sudan and Afghanistan. Clammer is the co-author of several guide books for Lonely Planet and the founder of Kabul Caravan, a website focussing on helping travellers visit Afghanistan.

Clammer attended St Ivo School, St Ives, Cambridgeshire and studied Zoology at the University of Bristol.

== Writings ==
- Lonely Planet Guide: Haiti
- Lonely Planet Guide: Sudan
- Lonely Planet Guide: Afghanistan
