= Tom M. Scotney =

British company

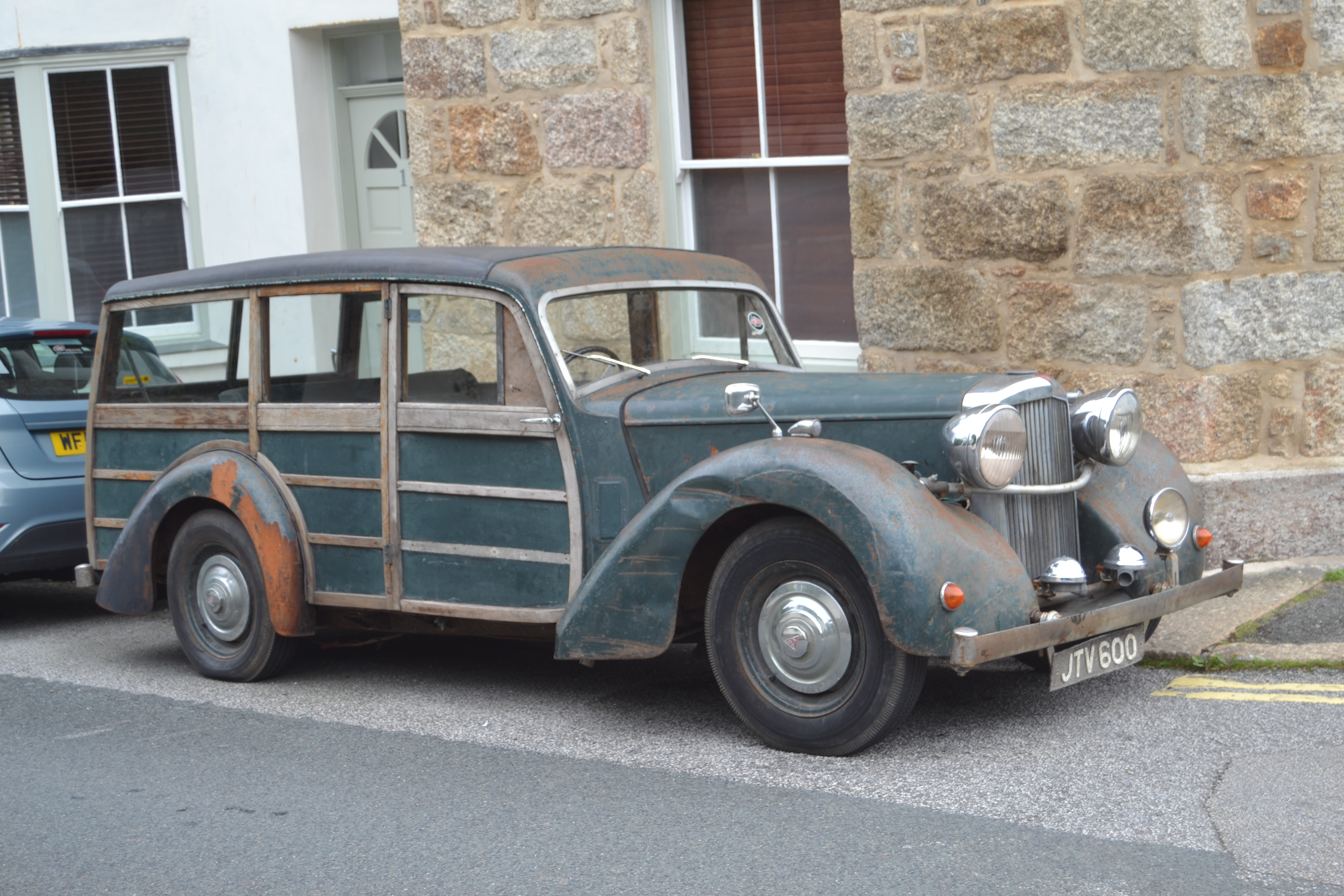
Alvis TA 14 Estate with timber frame body possibly by Tom M. Scotney Ltd (1946–47)

Tom M. Scotney Ltd was a British timber and joinery and timber construction business in St. Ives, Huntingdonshire. Scotney's was greatly enlarged by wartime defence contracts which included prefabricated buildings for searchlight installations and buildings for other special purposes in other counties and hundreds of special wooden boats for the D-day landing in France. In the late 1940s Scotney, obliged to diversify, added heavy truck trailers and related activities including timber-framed coachbuilding for local motor dealers during the post-war steel shortages. After two takeovers Scotney's closed its doors in mid-1970.

Scotney had their premises beside the London Road in St.Ives, a small town on the southern edge of The Fens in Eastern England.

The business was set up with the name Tom M. Scotney Ltd in 1920 by a former World War I airforce pilot called Tom Markley Scotney (1897-1959), but its origins as a manufacturer of timber fencing and other structures for the agricultural businesses in the region went back to the enterprise established several decades earlier by Scotney's father, William Scotney (1869-1949). Scotneys was well established during the 1930s, incorporating its own timber mill and producing a range of timber based products. It was still at the same address in 1970, although by 1973 the business was no longer focused on truck trailers or car bodies, and Thomas Scotney himself had died in 1959 so was no longer running it. Although a wide range of timber products were produced during the 1950s the burgeoning plastics industry took their market. Scotney's increasingly focused on specialist packing cases, notably for the Ministry of Defence and the aircraft industry. By the 1970s the company was disparagingly identified as by one source as a "packing case manufacturer" or, more respectfully, as "packaging engineers".

Coachbuilding activities in the late 1940s also took in timber frame "woody" station wagon bodies for traditionally constructed luxury cars from manufacturers such as Alvis and Lea Francis.
