= Something on High =

Studio album by Sivu
- Released: 10 October 2014
- Length: 41:06
- Label: Atlantic Records
- Producer: Charlie Andrew

Sivu chronology
Something on High (2014)	Sweet Sweet Silent (2017)

Singles from Something on High
- 1. "Better Man Than He" Released: 25 February 2013; 2. "Can't Stop Now" Released: 21 March 2014; 3. "Miracle (Human Error)" Released: 25 July 2014

Something on High is the debut studio album by English singer-songwriter Sivu, released on 10 October 2014 by Atlantic Records.

== Singles ==
Sivu's debut single, "Better Man Than He", was released on 25 February 2013. The single was described by Complex as "immediately catchy but [with] enough lyrical substance to reward multiple listens." For the official music video, directed by Adam Powell, Sivu was filmed lip-synching inside an MRI scanner.

== Critical reception ==
Chris White, reviewing for MusicOMH, rated the album 3.5/5 stars, and both The Guardian and NME gave it 3/5 stars.

== Promotion ==
Sivu performed at the Reading Festival in August 2014.

== Track listing ==
Credits adapted from Spotify.

1. "Feel Something" (3:27)
2. "Rumination" (1:07)
3. "Bodies" (3:50)
4. "Better Man Than He" (3:15)
5. "Can't Stop Now" (3:39)
6. "Love Lives in This House" (3:38)
7. "My Oh My" (3:40)
8. "Miracle (Human Error) (3:43)
9. "Sleep" (3:58)
10. "Communicate" (3:49)
11. "Departure" (3:13)
12. "Hidden Track" (3:43)
