= Houghton Mill =

Water mill located on the Great Ouse in Cambridgeshire, England

Coordinates: 52°19′51″N 0°7′15″W

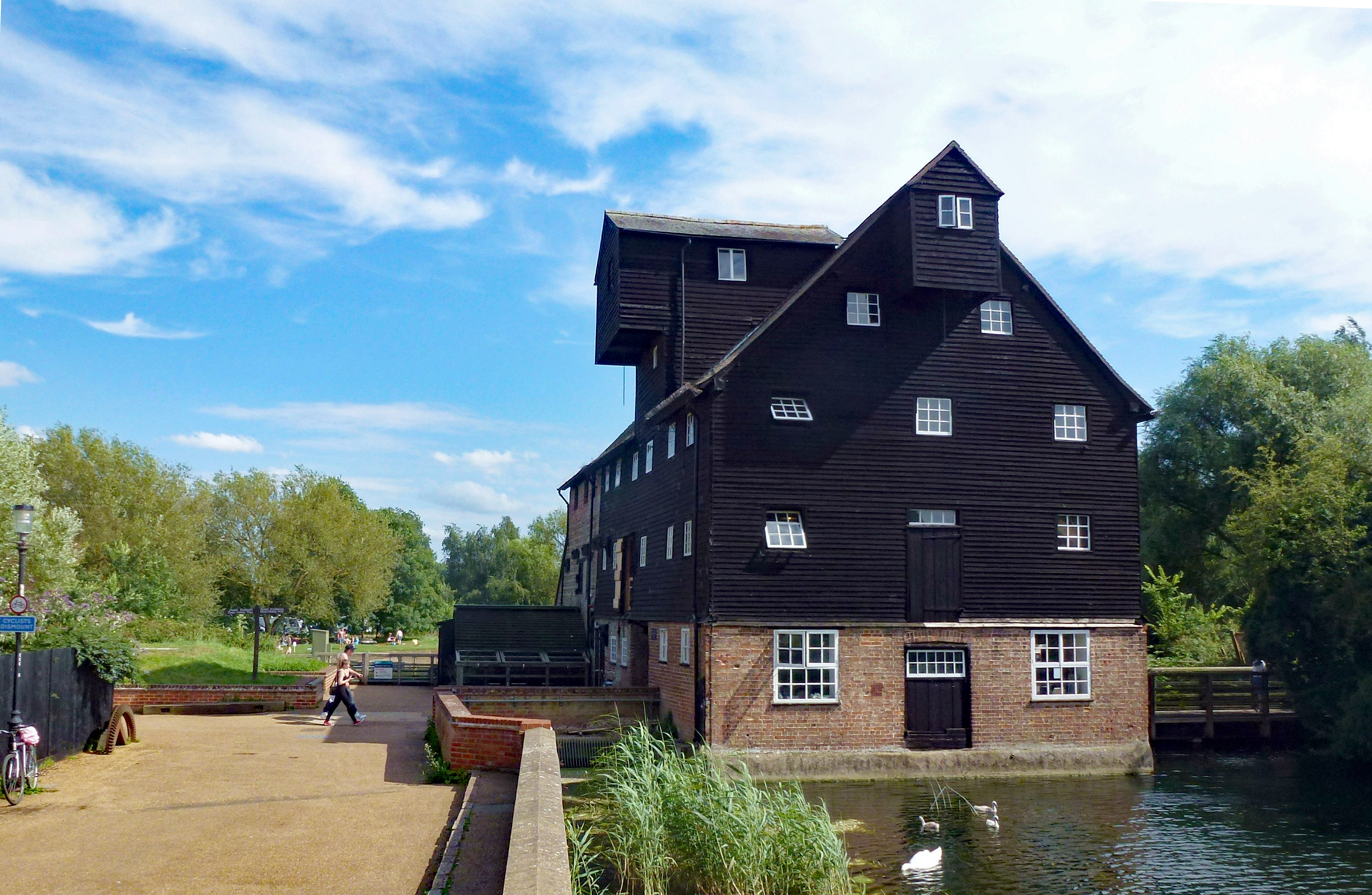
- View of the mill from the west

- Location within Cambridgeshire
- Type: Watermill
- Location: Houghton, Cambridgeshire
- OS grid reference: TL2816071975

History
- Built: 17th Century

Site notes
- Owner: National Trust

Listed Building – Grade II*
- Official name: Houghton Mill
- Designated: 24 October 1951
- Reference no.: 1128403

Houghton Mill is a water mill located on the Great Ouse in the village of Houghton, Cambridgeshire, England. It is a National Trust property and a Grade II* listed building.

== History ==
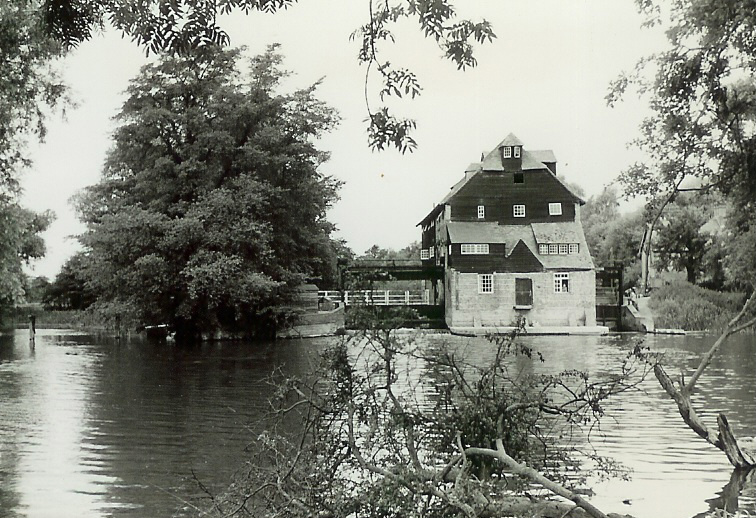
Houghton Mill viewed from the east in the 1960s

Mills have been recorded here since 974. The mill was owned by the nearby Ramsey Abbey from its foundation. The abbey's tenants were under an obligation to have their wheat ground in the mill and part of the flour was withheld as payment by the miller. When in 1500 the Abbot diverted the river water in order to supply the mill with sufficient power, the neighbouring village was flooded. The villagers rose up in protest, and fifteen years later they were granted permission to change the course of the water in case of an emergency.

At the Dissolution of the Monasteries, ownership of the mill reverted to the Crown. The present mill replaces one burnt down in the 17th century.

The best-known miller was the nonconformist Potto Brown (1797–1871), a wealthy man who was so pious that he carried his ledgers to family prayer meetings in order to discuss with his Maker debts owed him. After his death, a bronze bust of him was erected in Houghton.

== The present building ==
Although there has been a mill on this site for most of Houghton's history, the original mill site (certainly in the time of the Domesday book) was approximately 0.4 miles (0.64 km) along the river towards Huntingdon. The original mill pond is still there but now appears to be a natural backwater.

The present building was probably built in the 17th century, and extended in the 19th century. It consists of three storeys and attics. the building is part brick, part timber-framed and weather-boarded.

In the 1930s, the mill was decommissioned. Local residents bought the building and it was given to the National Trust in 1939. From 1935 to 1983, the mill was in use as a youth hostel, and was one of the few YHA establishments where smoking was forbidden because of fire hazard.

In 1999, the National Trust put in new millstones. Flour is still milled, and the building is now a tourist attraction, with a camping site nearby. Houghton Mill is the last working watermill on the Great Ouse. A traditional waterwheel enables the mill to produce stoneground flour and, when water levels are too low to power the waterwheel, hydro-electrically powered millstones are used. It mills wheat grown at the National Trust's Wimpole Estate, 19 miles (30 km) away. During the Covid-19 Pandemic the mill was shut down. On reopening it was found that the wheel was too damaged to turn. Major repairs and renovations were carried out and the mill resumed operation in May 2022. In 2013 a new set of electric-powered millstones were installed which allows the mill to operate at times when the river levels are not suitable.

== See also ==
- Christopher Biden
