= Albert Peatfield =

English cricketer

Personal information
- Full name: Albert Edward Peatfield
- Born: 13 April 1874; Retford, Nottinghamshire, England
- Died: 12 December 1953 (aged 79); Retford, Nottinghamshire, England
- Batting: Right-handed

Domestic team information
- Years: Team
- 1903: Glamorgan

Career statistics
Competition	First-class
Matches	1
Runs scored	18
Batting average	18.00
100s/50s	0/0
Top score	16
Catches/stumpings	0/–
- Source: Cricinfo, 18 June 2019

Albert Edward Peatfield (13 April 1874 – 12 December 1953) was an English first-class cricketer.

Peatfield was educated at Huntingdon Grammar School, Elmfield College, and at Victoria University. After graduating, he went into teaching and was an assistant master at a high school in Blackpool. Prior to his appointment as an assistant master in Blackpool, Peatfield worked in Wales, where he played minor counties cricket for Glamorgan, making three appearances in the 1903 Minor Counties Championship. Having moved to Blackpool, Peatfield played a single first-class cricket match for an England XI against the touring West Indians at Blackpool in 1906. Batting twice in the match, he ended the England XI first-innings not out on 2, while in their second-innings he was dismissed for 16 runs by Sydney Smith. He died at Retford, the town of his birth, in December 1953.
