= St Ives Town Hall =

Municipal building in St Ives, Cambridgeshire, England

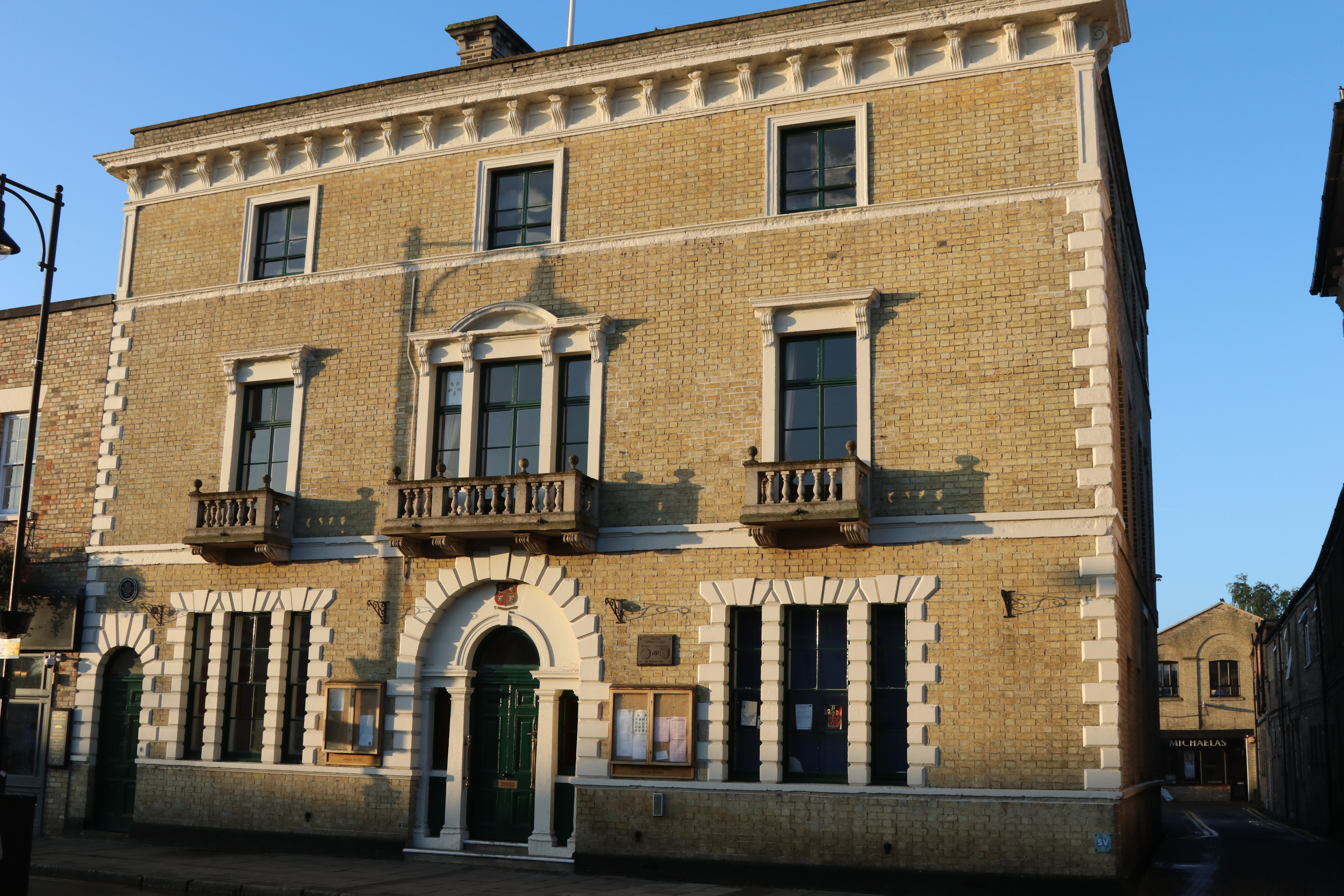
- St Ives Town Hall

- Shown in Cambridgeshire
- 52.3231°N 0.0730°W
- Location: Market Hill, St Ives, Cambridgeshire

History
- Built: 1850

Site notes
- Architect: George Allen
- Architectural style: Neoclassical style

Listed Building – Grade II
- Official name: Town Hall
- Designated: 24 March 1972
- Reference no.: 1330649

St Ives Town Hall is a municipal structure in Market Hill, St Ives, Cambridgeshire, England. The structure, which is the meeting place of St Ives Town Council, is a Grade II listed building.

== History ==
The building was originally commissioned by a currier, John Warner, as a private residence known as Stanley House. It was designed by a local architect, George Allen, in the neoclassical style, built by a local contractor, Henry Bennett and Son, in brown brick with stone dressings and was completed in 1850. The design involved a symmetrical main frontage with three bays facing onto Market Hill; the central bay featured a doorway with a fanlight, a rusticated archivolt and a keystone. On the first floor there was a three-light pedimented window and on the second floor there was a small square window. The outer bays were fenestrated by three-light windows with archivolts on the ground floor, sash windows with brackets and cornices on the first floor and small square windows on the second floor. The first floor windows also all had stone balconies. At roof level there was a modillioned cornice which jutted out over the pavement. Internally, the principal room was the drawing room on the first floor.

After Warner died in 1872, the house passed to his son, William Wigston Warner, who served five separate terms as mayor of St Ives. In the early 1920s, the Warner family decided to sell the house and, after a brief period of ownership by Lloyds Bank, it was acquired by St Ives Borough Council for £1,200 in 1924. There was strong opposition to the acquisition: there was rioting in the streets and some local people even stood for election with a manifesto of opposing the acquisition. The council commissioned a programme of works to convert the drawing room on the first floor into a council chamber and to establish an office for the town clerk, although it was later claimed that the works were carried out without planning consent.

The town hall continued to serve as the headquarters of the borough council for much of the 20th century, but ceased to be the local seat of government when the enlarged Huntingdonshire District Council was formed in 1974. It continued to function as the offices and meeting place of St Ives Town Council, and also provided office accommodation for various local organisations including the Cambridgeshire Branch of CPRE, The Countryside Charity, as well as acting as a place of worship for the local branch of the United Reformed Church. An extensive programme of improvement works, including the installation of a lift, was completed in 2009.
