= Potto Brown =

English philanthropist (1797–1871)

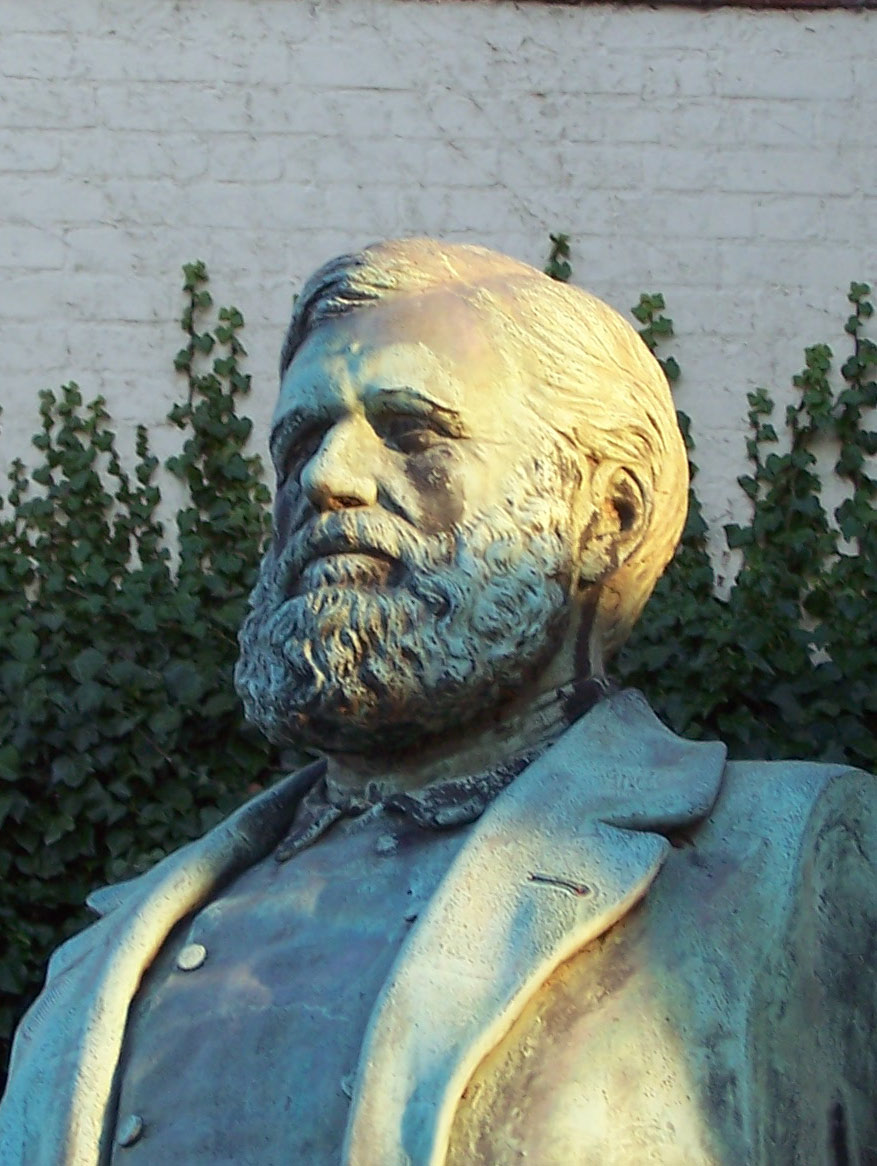
Statue of Brown in his home village of Houghton, Cambridgeshire

Potto Brown (1797–1871) was a miller and nonconformist philanthropist in Huntingdonshire, England. He is commemorated by a statue in the village of Houghton where he was born, lived and died. Local schools and churches are a monument to his philanthropy.

== Early life ==
Brown was born into a prominent Quaker family. He was the fourth of 12 children of William Brown and Elizabeth Hicks and was named after his paternal grandmother, Sarah Potto. Brown’s father was a baker and miller in Earith, moving to Houghton to run Houghton Mill on the River Ouse.

Brown's first school was Huntingdon Grammar School. He then spent some time as a boarder at a school run by Jeremiah Holmes Wiffen in Woburn, Bedfordshire before attending Slepe Hall in St Ives, a school for about 75 boys many of whom came from dissenting families. He did not excel academically; "That which is conventionally called education left strangely few traces upon him", wrote biographer Neville Goodman, adding that "no boy was more apt to profit by practical experience".

Upon leaving school Brown, together with Goodman, started work in his father’s mill. They took over the running of the mill in 1821 when William Brown retired. After his retirement William Brown took up medicine, attending lectures and hospital rounds in London and then becoming apprenticed to a local surgeon and apothecary, George Cockle.

== Marriage ==
In 1822 Brown married fellow Quaker Mary Bateman, a Quaker from Chatteris. They had several children of whom only two survived infancy. Bateman and George Brown followed their father into milling. Bateman Brown became mayor of St Ives, only the second nonconformist to hold the position since the time of Oliver Cromwell. One of Brown’s grandsons became the fourth generation of the family to run the mill at Houghton. A granddaughter married the artist Charles Whymper. A greatgrandson, Bateman Brown Tarring, won the London amateur 1-mile speed skating championship in December 1892. Brown was widowed in 1854, remarried and was widowed again. He married for the third time in 1869.

== Milling ==
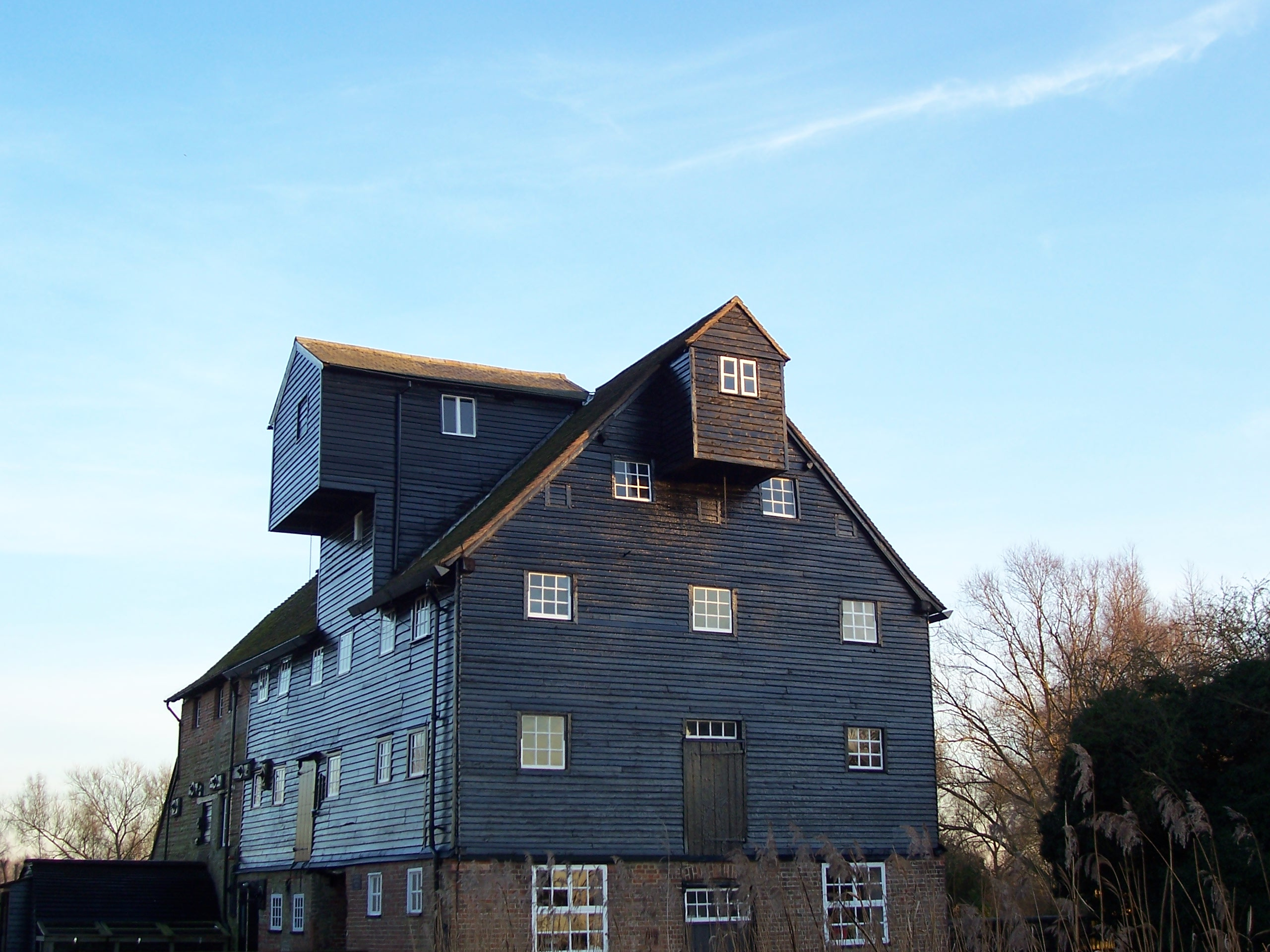
Houghton Mill

Brown and Joseph Goodman, grandfather of the bandy pioneer Charles Goodman Tebbutt, built up a thriving milling business. "Brown and Goodman" of Houghton Flour Mills employed eighteen men and produced a flour whose reputation was well known in London. Brown worked on the principle that the best flour came from a combination of careful blending of wheat and the use of the best milling machinery. Known as a "slow grinder", he spared no expense on his millstones. Having established a friendship with the French miller Auguste-Rodolphe Darblay, Brown adopted the French millstone ventilation system and the French method of dressing millstones with black diamonds.

With the help of his sons and one of Goodman’s sons (Goodman having died in 1844) Brown expanded the business by building steam mills at St Ives (1854) and Godmanchester (1861). Both mills employed the latest French milling technology. He retired from the business in 1862 and spent the remaining years of his life on farming, philanthropic activities, and work as a magistrate.

== "The village philanthropist" ==
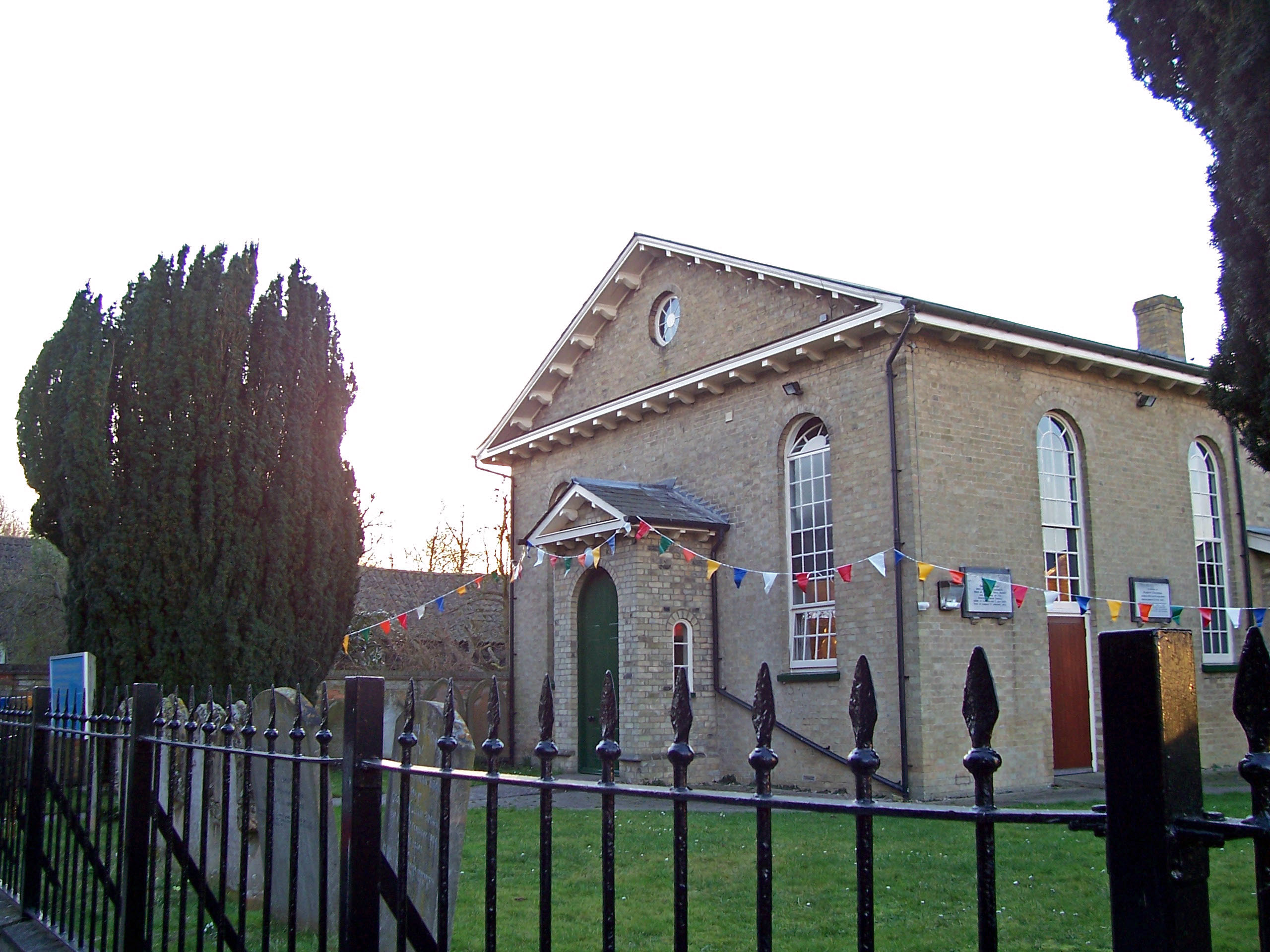
Houghton Chapel

Once he had established a successful business and become a wealthy man, Brown turned his attention to religious and charitable work. "I mean to work hard", he once said, "I don’t want to have a poking hut in heaven. I mean to have a large mansion and a park." He was disowned by the Quakers in 1837 following a quarrel with a fellow Quaker in Houghton and became, by default, a Congregationalist. Tolerant of other denominations, he welcomed into his home French Catholics and American Protestants alike. Visitors included the revivalist Charles Grandison Finney and the peace and anti-slavery activist Elihu Burritt. Although a supporter of the Temperance movement he offered wine or beer to guests over the age of sixty.

In 1840 Brown and Goodman founded the chapel in Houghton, which previously had no place for nonconformist worship. A minister was employed to preach in Houghton and neighbouring villages. They also set up British schools (schools not associated with the Church of England) in Houghton and St Ives. Two decades later Brown donated £3,000 to build the Free Church in St Ives, a centre of worship for the union of Baptists and Independents of St Ives and the Congregationalists of surrounding villages. Brown also donated £1,000 towards the cost of Huntingdon Free Church.

Brown helped run the St Ives Friendly Society and provided allotments for the inhabitants of St Ives, Warboys and Houghton. He also organised an annual temperance fête as a rival to the Houghton Feast (an attempt to establish a "respectable dancing booth" at the feast having failed), and was a supporter of the Lifeboat Society.

== The statue ==
In 1878, seven years after his death, a monument to Brown was unveiled in Houghton. The monument consists of a bronze bust on a pedestal of polished red Aberdeen granite. It was produced in Andrea Carlo Lucchesi's studio in London and was based on a model by Albert Goodman, a son of Brown’s milling partner. The inscription reads: "Potto Brown was born in this village 16 July 1797 where he spent his life devoting himself to the best interests of those around him and died 12 April 1871." On either side are King James Bible texts. On the left: "But if any provide not for his own, and specially for those of his own house, he hath denied the faith, and is worse than an infidel." (1 Timothy Chapter 5, Verse 8). On the right: "Pure religion and undefiled before God and the Father is this, To visit the fatherless and widows in their affliction, and to keep himself unspotted from the world." (Epistle of James Chapter 1, Verse 27).
