= Robert Wild (poet) =

Robert Wild (or Wylde; 1617–1659) was an English clergyman and poet, known for his wit and controversial writings. Despite his presbyterian views, Wild held royalist in political beliefs and was eventually evicted from the position in 1662. John Dryden called him 'the Wither of the city.' He wrote extensively, often anonymously and controversially.

== Life ==
Robert Wild was born to Robert Wild, a shoemaker of St Ives, Huntingdonshire. After a private education at St Ives, he was admitted as a sizar to St John's College, Cambridge, on 26 January 1632, and was made a scholar in 1634, graduating B.A. in 1636, M.A. in 1639, B.D. (at Oxford) in 1642, D.D. (at Cambridge, per literas regias) in 1661.

As a youth, Wild held strong Puritan beliefs, and was appointed to the living of Aynhoe, Northamptonshire, by order of the House of Commons on 22 July 1646. Wild's reputation for his wit and controversial views gave his friend a renowned theologian Richard Baxter so much discomfort that he visited Aynhoe, intending to rebuke him. However, after having sat in the corner of the church, and listened to his sermon, he changed his mind and instead asked Wild to rebuke him sharply, for having listened to the reports!

Wild was ejected by the Act of Uniformity 1662. He lived at Aynhoe a year or two after 1662, supported amongst others by Sir John Baber, physician to King Charles II, to whom, for a timely gift of ten crowns, Wild addressed The Grateful Nonconformist (1665). Later Wild was living at Oundle. He was indicted in July 1669 at Warwick and Coventry assizes for keeping a conventicle.

Robert Wild was married to Joyce. They had at least two sons, both of whom became conforming ministers. He died at Oundle due to apoplexy and was laid to rest on 30 July 1679.

== Works ==
Robert wild notable work is ''Iter Boreale''. A poem appreciating the Successful and Matchless March of the Lord General George Monk from Scotland to London. Published on 23 April 1660, which gained its popularity as a tribute to General George Monck. Robert Wild poems were published by John Hunt in 1870.

According to Edmund Gosse, Wild ("that curious poetaster") followed John Cleveland in attempting "to restore poetry to a rugged English force, to dismiss the elegancies of a Gallic style, and to strengthen verse without abandoning the overflow [i.e. enjambment]," representing a middle path between the eclectic Marinism of the previous generation and the new classicism of Waller and Denham. Gosse selects Wild's "Alas, poor scholar, whither wilt thou go?" as his most pleasing work, writing that "It is a curious picture of life under the Commonwealth, and it is written in a romantic and singular measure, with great earnestness of feeling; among the literature of the age I know nothing that quite resembles it."

== Notes ==
This article incorporates text from a publication now in the public domain: "Wild, Robert". Dictionary of National Biography. London: Smith, Elder & Co. 1885–1900.

== Bibliography ==
- Hunt, John. Poems by Robert Wilde, with a historical and biographical preface and notes (Strahan, 1870).
