= Sivu =

- Born: James Page; 1988 (age 37–38); Huntingdon, Cambridgeshire, England
- Origin: St. Ives, Cambridgeshire, England
- Occupations: Singer, songwriter
- Instruments: Vocals, piano, guitar
- Years active: 2013–present
- Labels: Atlantic Records; Square Leg Records
- Website: sivusivu.co.uk

James Page, known professionally as Sivu (pronounced see-voo), is an English singer and songwriter. He has released two studio albums, Something on High (2014) and Sweet Sweet Silent (2017). His third studio album, Wild Horse Running, was released on 9 June 2023. The album was preceded by the singles "Wild Horse Running", "Apollo", "Choral Light" and "Overtime Lover". Sivu's longtime producer and collaborator is Charlie Andrew.

== Early life ==
James Page was born in Huntingdon, Cambridgeshire and raised in St Ives, Cambridgeshire, a small market town in England. He attended St Ivo School.

== Name origin ==
In a 2013 interview with the BBC, Sivu said, "I didn't like the idea of being bound by a name, I like the idea of taking it somewhere else that wasn't necessarily all about me. "Sivu" is Finnish for "Page" so that's where it came from."

== Career ==
=== 2013-2015: Something on High ===
Sivu's first solo single was February 2013’s "Better Man Than He", described by Complex as "immediately catchy but [with] enough lyrical substance to reward multiple listens." For the official music video, directed by Adam Powell, Sivu was filmed lip-synching inside an MRI scanner. Sivu collaborated with Marika Hackman at the end of 2013 on the single "I Hold". On 21 March 2014, Sivu released the single "Can't Stop Now". The digital single included a remix by Bombay Bicycle Club's Jack "Mr Jukes" Steadman. Sivu performed at the Reading Festival in August 2014.

Sivu's debut studio album, Something on High, was released on 10 October 2014 to generally positive reviews from critics; Chris White, reviewing for MusicOMH, rated the album 3.5/5 stars, and both The Guardian and NME gave 3/5 stars. Sivu then made a cameo appearance on Alt-J's second studio album, This Is All Yours, and supported the Bombay Bicycle Club on tour in December 2014. In February 2015, he released "The Nile", featuring singer Rae Morris. An official music video was released in May 2015.

=== 2016-2018: Sweet Sweet Silent ===
Sivu's second studio album, Sweet Sweet Silent, was released in 2017. Emma Mackay, writing for The Guardian, rated the album 3/5 stars and called it an "eerie, subtle thing", opining "[t]hough Sivu’s own developments are not drastic, they’re certainly beguiling." Sivu lives with Ménière's disease, which heavily impacted and inspired the recording of Sweet Sweet Silent; as explained in his album commentary, the track “summed up the feeling across the whole album,” and his “feelings of despair and uncertainty over his future." The album included the singles "Childhood House", "Lonesome", "Kin & Chrome" and "Sweet Sweet Silent". In November 2017, Sivu performed at the Theatre Circo in Portugal, and at the Blue Bird Festival in Austria.

=== 2023: Wild Horse Running ===
On 1 February 2023, Sivu returned with the single "Wild Horse Running". "[The song] grew from this yearning to escape, whether mentally or physically I’m still unsure – but to me the image of a wild horse running is the epitome of freedom and conjures so many feelings of strength, resilience and really a triumph in physical evolution. From there the song just grew in my mind, with an almost cinematic view in my head." On 8 March 2023, he released the single "Apollo", and announced that his third studio album, titled Wild Horse Running, would be released in June 2023. On the same day, Sivu announced he would be performing in a one-off headline show at the Courtyard Theatre, London on 14 June 2023 in celebration of his album release; he announced the show's support act, Meadowlark on 13 April 2023. Sivu released a new single, "Choral Light", on 19 April 2023. Upon the release, he shared, "I wrote "Choral Light" just before the birth of my little boy, so I was generally quite overwhelmed with a mixture of emotions [...] This song grew from this ruminating thought I had about what I traits I would pass on to my child and how some would be good and some not and how these things would potentially stay with him for the rest of his life." The album's fourth preceding single, "Overtime Lover", was released on 24 May 2023. Clash called the song "lush [...] ambitious" and "pop at its most sincere". Wild Horse Running was released on 9 June 2023. Sivu released the single "Constant Flux" on the same day. The Spill Magazine rated the album 4/5 stars, opining that "Sivu bring[s] up an excellent, modern take on what [the] singer songwriter genre should sound like."

On 9 August 2024, Sivu released the EP Perfect Life. The EP was preceded by singles "Lost Ones" (featuring AK Patterson) and "Little Hurricane". Sivu tweeted about the release of the EP, "This EP was built upon small ideas and the approach of working on something quietly and as simply as possible."

== Personal life ==
Sivu has a son and, as of 2023, lives in London.

In 2013, Sivu was diagnosed with Ménière's disease, a condition of the inner ear. He later wrote an article for the HuffPost: "Right now, who knows what the future holds for me? There is a possibility that I could end up being completely deaf, unable to sing or play my guitar anymore but I try not to think about it and take each day as it comes."

== Discography ==
=== Studio albums ===
List of studio albums, with selected details
Title	Details
Something on High	Released: 10 October 2014; Label: Atlantic Records; Format: Digital download, CD, vinyl
Sweet Sweet Silent	Released: 7 July 2017; Label: Square Leg Records Ltd; Format: Digital download, CD, vinyl
Wild Horse Running	Released: 9 June 2023; Label: Square Leg Records Ltd; Format: Digital download, CD

=== Extended plays ===
List of extended plays, with selected details
Title	Details
This Unfruitful Love	Released: 16 February 2018; Label: Square Leg Records; Format: Digital download
Perfect Life	Released: 9 August 2024; Label: Square Leg Records; Format: Digital download

=== Singles ===
List of singles as lead artist, showing year released and originating album
Title	Year	Album
"Better Man Than He"	2013	Something on High
"I Hold" (featuring Marika Hackman)	2013	Non-album single
"Can't Stop Now"	2014	Something on High
"Miracle (Human Error)"	2014	Something on High
"I Lost Myself"	2014	Non-album singles
"The Nile" (featuring Rae Morris)	2015	Non-album singles
"Childhood House"	2017	Sweet Sweet Silent
"Lonesome"	2017	Sweet Sweet Silent
"Kin & Chrome"	2017	Sweet Sweet Silent
"Sweet Sweet Silent"	2017	Sweet Sweet Silent
"Four Leaf Clover Love"	2018	This Unfruitful Love / Sweet Sweet Silent: Deluxe Edition
"Trickle"	2018	This Unfruitful Love / Sweet Sweet Silent: Deluxe Edition
"Wild Horse Running"	2023	Wild Horse Running
"Apollo"	2023	Wild Horse Running
"Choral Light"	2023	Wild Horse Running
"Overtime Lover"	2023	Wild Horse Running
"Constant Flux"	2023	Wild Horse Running
"Lost Ones" (with AK Patterson)	2024	Perfect Life
"Little Hurricane"	2024	Perfect Life

=== Guest appearances ===
Title	Year	Album
"Come Together" (Laurel featuring Sivu)	2014	Holy Water
"Skin" (Marika Hackman featuring Sivu)	2015	We Slept at Last
"Warm Foothills" (Alt-J featuring Sivu)
