= Christopher Biden =

British sea captain

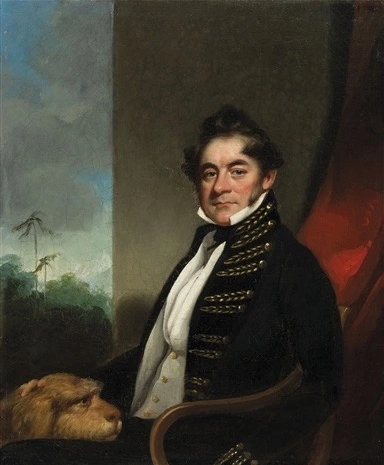
- Christopher Biden (with dog Hector) by George Chinnery
- Born: Houghton, Huntingdonshire, England
- Baptised: 13 May 1790
- Died: 25 February 1858 (aged 68); Madras, India
- Monuments: St George's Cathedral, Chennai
- Occupation: Officer in the East India Company Mercantile Marine
- Spouse: Harriott Freeth

Christopher Biden (c. 1789 – 25 February 1858) was a British sea captain who worked for the East India Company. He came from the village of Houghton in Huntingdonshire. Retiring after more than twenty years at sea, he wrote a book about naval discipline, made two voyages in his own ship to India, and then settled in Madras as a civil servant of the East India Company.

== Early life and family ==
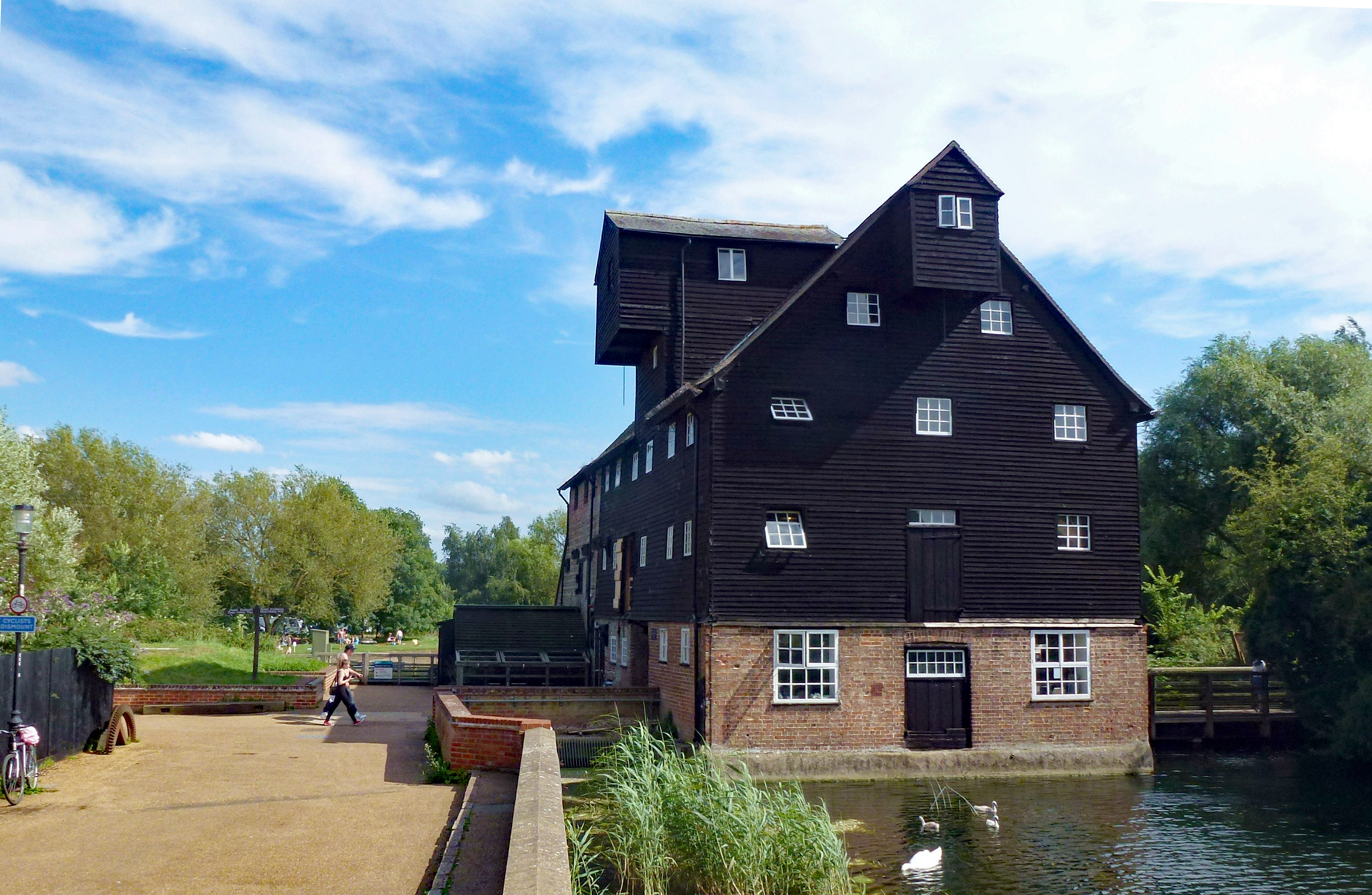
John Biden held the lease of Houghton Mill, a watermill on the Great Ouse in Huntingdonshire. It is now a National Trust property and a Grade II* listed building.

Biden was born in Houghton, Huntingdonshire, England. Biden's father, John Biden, leased Houghton Mill. Biden and his younger brother William Henry Biden went to sea at a young age, their father having died in 1797 and was buried in St Mary’s Church, Houghton. An older brother, Henry Lloyd, went to Cambridge University and became a clergyman. In 1818 Biden married Harriott Freeth in Great Wilne, a village in Derbyshire close to the town of Sandiacre where his brother was curate.

== Career ==
Between 1807 and 1818 Biden completed seven return voyages to India as a mate on the East Indiaman Royal George. By 1821 he was captain of the East Indiaman Princess Charlotte of Wales. Between 1821 and 1830 he completed four voyages to India as captain of the Princess Charlotte and one voyage to China as captain of the new Royal George. Biden then spent two years in Blackheath with his family, publishing a book on naval discipline in 1830. In 1832 and 1834 he sailed his own ship on voyages to India. On the second voyage he named Nelsons Island in the Chagos Archipelago.

In 1839 Biden returned to India to take up the position of Master Attendant and Marine Storekeeper at Madras (now Chennai). Whilst at Madras he worked on improving safety for shipping in coastal waters and was involved in charitable activities. He founded the Biden Home for Destitute Seamen at Royapuram.

== Death ==
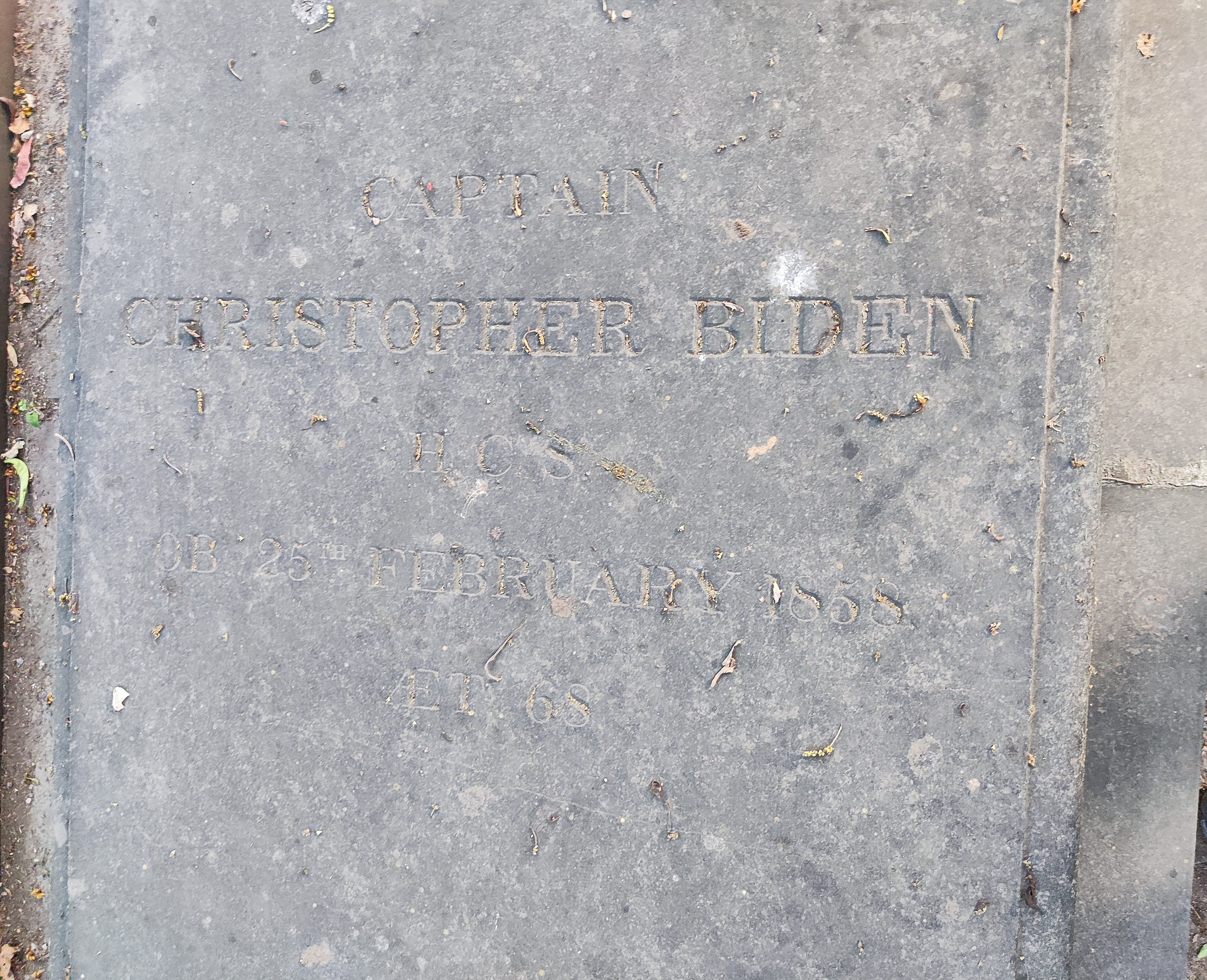
Grave in St George's Cathedral, Chennai

Biden died at Madras in February 1858 at the age of 68 and was commemorated by a plaque in St George's Cathedral. His widow died in London in 1880. He was also survived by two sons and a daughter, another daughter having died on the voyage out to India in 1839.

== Legacy ==
One of Biden's sons, Horatio Biden, joined the Madras Army and is said to have descendants living in India. In 2020 there was speculation in the media that the Bidens of India might be related to Joe Biden, later president of the United States. It was suggested that Joe Biden's immigrant ancestor William Biden, who died in Baltimore in 1849, was Christopher Biden's brother William Henry Biden. However, William Henry Biden is recorded as having died at Rangoon (Yangon) in 1843, so is not the William Biden of Baltimore and any common ancestor of Joe Biden and the Bidens of India would have to be further back than John Biden of Houghton.

Harriott Biden kept a common-place book with newspaper cuttings, letters, etc., relating to her husband's work in Madras. The book is preserved on microfilm at the Centre of South Asian Studies at Cambridge University.

== Selected publications ==
- Naval Discipline: Subordination Contrasted with Insubordination

== See also ==
- Monegar Choultry
