= St Ivo Academy =

Astrea St Ivo Academy

Location
- St. Ives, Cambridgeshire, PE27 6RR; England; 52°19′51″N 0°05′05″W

Information
- Motto: Work hard, be kind
- Religious affiliation: None
- Established: 1954
- Local authority: Cambridgeshire
- Department for Education URN: 137305 Tables
- Ofsted: Reports
- Principal: Jess Pearce
- Staff: ~200
- Gender: Coeducational
- Age: 11 to 18
- Enrolment: 1,493
- Houses: Bridge; Crosier; Ledger; River; Wheatsheaf
- Website: http://www.astreastivo.org/

St Ivo Academy is an academy secondary school and part of Astrea Academy Trust, with sixth form in St. Ives, Cambridgeshire, originally St Ivo School before being taken by Astrea.

== Specialist status ==
In September 2008 St Ivo Academy was designated a Specialist Humanities School.

In 2018/2019 St Ivo School joined Astrea Academy Trust to become St Ivo Academy.

== St Ivo Entomology and Natural History Society ==
The St Ivo Entomology and Natural History Society was founded in 1957 and existed under the guidance of biology master Henry Berman until c2007. Regular examinations were held and prizes (for example the Edward Elkan prize) were awarded to students with the best results.

Members exhibited the society's animals on an annual basis at the Amateur Entomologists' Society exhibition in London: held at Holland Park School until the mid 1970s, then at Hounslow Civic Centre, and later at Kempton Park Racecourse. The society also regularly exhibited at the Cambridge Natural History Society exhibition, held in the Cambridge University Zoology Department, and the Scoool's Natural History Societies' exhibition at the Natural History Museum in London. In addition, the animal collection was a regular feature at local fairs and was sometimes exhibited to other Cambridgeshire school classes.

The society was known amongst pupils as "ento" or "ent soc", and members wore a small yellow badge with a picture of a two-spot ladybird, Adalia bipunctata. The society motto was "There is no they", meaning that members must take individual responsibility and not leave this to others (although the informal motto was actually "beg borrow and steal" to encourage resourcefulness). A number of former members pursued careers relating to animals and natural history.

== Notable alumni ==
- Scott Barron, Brentford F.C. footballer
- Dominic Byrne, The Chris Moyles Show, BBC Radio 1
- Paul Clammer, author of Lonely Planet guide to Afghanistan
- Leanne Jones, actress
- Bryony Kimmings, performance artist, screenwriter
- James Page, singer/songwriter, known professionally as Sivu
- Jonnie Peacock, paralympic sprinter
- Terry Reid, rock vocalist and guitarist
- John Ruddy, Newcastle United F.C. goalkeeper
- James Sykes, cricketer
- Conor Washington, footballer
- Annemarie Wright, artist
