= Hinchingbrooke School =

Location
- Brampton road Huntingdon, Cambridgeshire (historically in Huntingdonshire)
- Coordinates: 52°19′43″N 0°12′05″W

Information
- Type: Academy
- Motto: inspiring excellence fulfilling potential
- Established: 1565; 461 years ago
- Department for Education URN: 137475 Tables
- Ofsted: Reports
- Principal: Andy Hunter
- Gender: Coeducational
- Age: 11 to 18
- Enrolment: 1918
- Houses: Cromwell, Vesey, Montagu, Sparrow (formerly Pepys) & Wylton
- Colours: Green, red, yellow, blue and purple
- Website: https://www.hinchingbrookeschool.net

Hinchingbrooke School is a large comprehensive secondary school situated on the outskirts of Huntingdon in Cambridgeshire, historically in Huntingdonshire. Originally all of the surrounding land—including what is now Huntingdon Town—comprised the grounds of Hinchingbrooke House. There is still an avenue of trees leading from the start of Hinchingbrooke House towards the town, which was the old entranceway through the grounds. It is now an academy.

== History ==
Hinchingbrooke School was founded as Huntingdon Grammar School in 1565. Among its pupils in its early history were Oliver Cromwell and Samuel Pepys.

On 1 September 1939 it opened in a new building on Brampton Road. The girls from Highbury Hill High School in London were evacuated for safety and attended the premises from 1939 to 1943. In 1970 the school began to take pupils of all abilities and soon became fully comprehensive. At the same time the school changed its name and moved to new premises in Hinchingbrooke Park and the renovated Hinchingbrooke House.

In 2006 Hinchingbrooke School became a Specialist Sports College. It is now an academy.

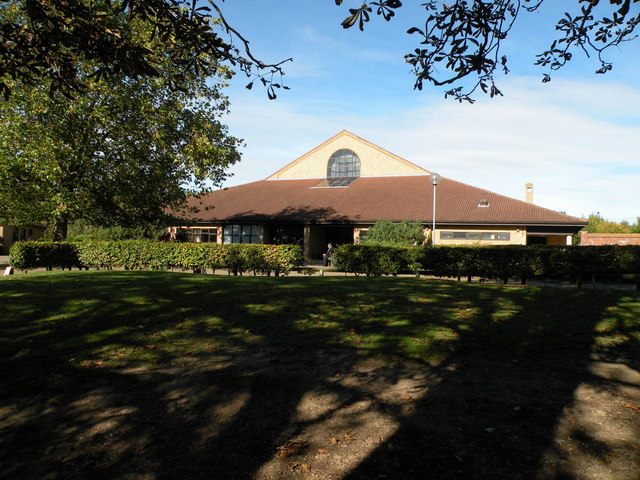
The Performing Arts Centre

== Hinchingbrooke sixth form ==
The sixth form is located in the historic Hinchingbrooke House itself, with most classrooms and student areas within the Grade I listed building.

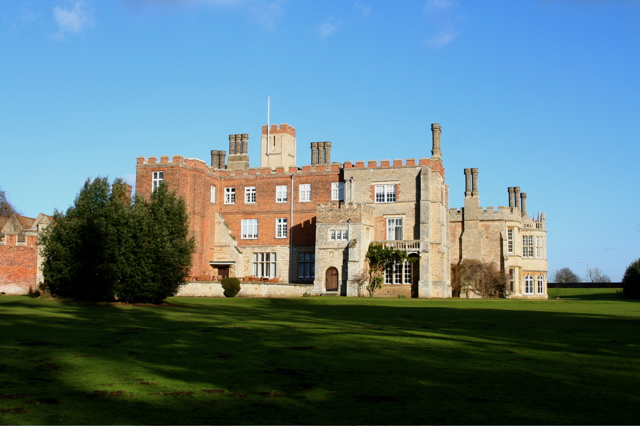
Hinchingbrooke House

== Hinchingbrooke main school ==
The main school includes sports facilities, such as a swimming pool, the Fisherhall Dance Studio, a 3rd generation Artificial Grass Pitch and a fitness suite. Some of these are open to the public. A new sports hall has recently been constructed.

== Notable former pupils ==
- Darren Bent (footballer)
- Poppy Gustafsson (British businesswoman and government official)
- Iwan Thomas (Athlete)
- Carla Humphrey (footballer)

=== Huntingdon Grammar School ===
- Potto Brown, philanthropist
- John Butcher, Conservative MP from 1979–97 for Coventry South West
- Patrick Collinson, historian
- Oliver Cromwell, Lord Protector from 1653–58
- Robert William Edis, architect
- Amaryllis Garnett, actress, daughter of author David Garnett of the Bloomsbury Group
- Charles Goodchap, Australian politician
- Liz Hodgkinson, author
- Albert Peatfield, cricketer
- Samuel Pepys, diarist (briefly in 1644)
- Matthew Robinson, television and film director and producer
- Richard Rutt, Bishop of Leicester from 1979–90
