= James Sykes (cricketer) =

English cricketer (born 1992)

Personal information
- Full name: James Stuart Sykes
- Born: 26 April 1992 (age 34); Huntingdon, England
- Batting: Left-handed
- Bowling: Slow left-arm orthodox

Domestic team information
- Years: Team
- 2012–2017: Leicestershire (squad no. 80)
- FC debut: 17 July 2013 Leics v Essex
- LA debut: 21 June 2012 Leics v Australians

Career statistics
Competition	FC	LA	T20
Matches	12	24	5
Runs scored	186	48	2
Batting average	12.40	6.00	–
100s/50s	0/0	0/0	0/0
Top score	34	15	2*
Balls bowled	1,995	883	90
Wickets	21	21	3
Bowling average	55.52	40.42	35.66
5 wickets in innings	0	0	0
10 wickets in match	0	0	0
Best bowling	4/176	4/57	2/24
Catches/stumpings	6/–	3/–	0/–
- Source: CricketArchive, 23 June 2017

James Stuart Sykes (born 26 April 1992) is an English cricketer. Sykes is a left-handed batsman who bowls slow left-arm orthodox and who most recently played county cricket for Leicestershire. He was born at Huntingdon, Huntingdonshire, and was educated at St Ivo School.

Sykes made his senior debut in county cricket for Cambridgeshire in the 2010 MCCA Knockout Trophy against Lincolnshire. Having played for the Leicestershire Second XI with some success,

Sykes made his first team debut for Leicestershire in a List A match against the touring Australians at Grace Road in 2012. Leicestershire won the toss and put the Australians into bat, with the tourists making 241 all out from 41 overs, following several delays due to rain. Sykes took his maiden wicket when he dismissed Shane Watson for a single run. Further rain delays meant Leicestershire target was reduced to 239 from 36 overs. Leicestershire could only manage to make 136 all out, with Sykes being dismissed for 2 runs by Michael Clarke.

In 2013, Sykes took an active role in Leicestershire's season, taking 12 wickets in 7 County Championship matches and featuring regularly in Leicester's YB40 campaign. He was rewarded with a new 2-year deal keeping him at Grace Road until the end of the 2015 season.

On 22 June 2017, Sykes left Leicestershire by mutual consent to pursue other playing opportunities.
