= St Ives, Cambridgeshire =

Market town in Cambridgeshire, England

Coordinates: 52.334362°N 0.076147°W

St Ives
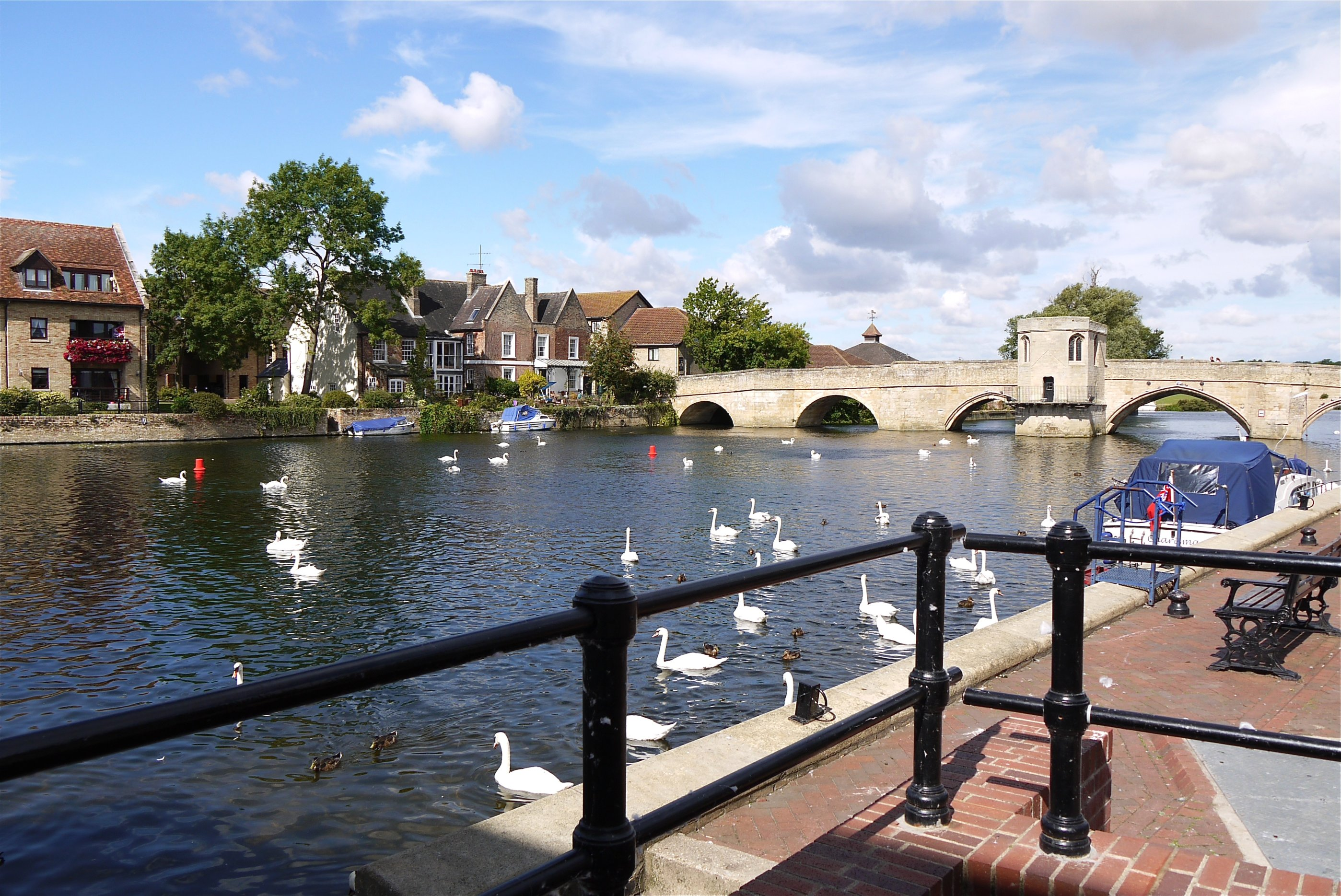
- St Ives Bridge and the River Great Ouse

- Location within Cambridgeshire
- Area: 10.88 km^{2} (4.20 sq mi)
- Population: 16,815 (2021 Census)
  - Density: 1,545/km^{2} (4,000/sq mi)
- OS grid reference: TL305725
  - London: 90 km (56 mi) South
- District: Huntingdonshire
- Shire county: Cambridgeshire
- Region: East
- Country: England
- Sovereign state: United Kingdom
- Post town: ST. IVES
- Postcode district: PE27
- Dialling code: 01480
- Police: Cambridgeshire
- Fire: Cambridgeshire
- Ambulance: East of England
- UK Parliament: Huntingdon

St Ives (/sənt ˈaɪvz/) is a medieval market town and civil parish in the Huntingdonshire district of Cambridgeshire, England. It is located on the River Great Ouse, and there is a historic stone bridge dating from 1425. The bridge has an unusual chapel incorporated into the structure. The nearby Quayside offers pleasing views of the river and the bridge.

The settlement was known at first as Slepe: it was at a convenient fording point on the river, which encouraged the establishment of a route for travellers between northern and eastern districts of the country, and London and the South, enhancing its importance. A little before the year 1000 CE, a coffin was dug up during ploughing: it apparently contained the remains of a holy man named Ivo of Ramsey, and as a result the town became a destination for pilgrims, and the name Slepe was changed over time to St Ives. A royal charter authorised the holding of a fair in the town; at the time this was hugely prestigious, further emphasising the town's significance.

A route for drovers became established through St Ives: they brought cattle and sheep from farming areas in Scotland and the North of England to the London and southern markets. As a stopping point en route the town developed an important cattle market. The importance of the route encouraged the building of a wooden bridge in 1107, and its replacement by the stone bridge in 1426. The bridge still exists; although very narrow it carried the main London Road from St Ives until a by-pass was built in 1980.

The economy of the town has always been dominated by agriculture. Twenty-first century changes have diminished the town's former dominance, but it remains a popular and pleasant place to live.

== History ==
=== Origin: Slepe and Ivo ===
St Ives was founded on the north bank of the wide River Great Ouse between Huntingdon and Ely, probably in the fifth or sixth century CE. There had been some Roman activity in the area, but the settlement that became St Ives originated in Anglo-Saxon times. It developed because it was possible to ford the river there; any more easterly crossing point would not have been practicable. The settlement was originally known as "Slepe", implying a muddy area. At that time and later, the area was virtually one large forest.

Little and Werba, writing in 1974, stated that "The site of the ford, of which a trace remains at the bottom of Church Street, was well upstream of the present bridge". This point of view is supported by the foundation of a Saxon church at the location of the present All Saints Church, suggesting that this was then the centre of the settlement. Burn-Murdoch, writing in 2009 argues that the straight track that became London Road "leads straight to the river bank and so must have been going to a river crossing of some kind... so the Saxon river crossing was probably either a ford or a ferry" at the location of the present-day bridge... Upstream at Slepe itself the river is deep and narrow with a muddy bottom, making it very difficult to ford..." He continues, "Crossing the river at Slepe [would have been] only half the battle: you also need to get across the wide expanse of the flood plain. The meadows on the south side of the river still flood regularly and are then impassable for days or weeks afterwards because of the mud left on them..." and there is no evidence of a Saxon causeway there.

Whatever the exact location of the ford, Slepe became important as it was the lowest convenient crossing of the River Great Ouse; it was an important waypoint for traffic between the Eastern Counties and London. River traffic too developed, although navigation on the river was difficult until major improvements were made much later, in the 17th century.

The legend of St Ivo relates that Slepe received a surprising visitation about a century after it had been established. One morning a tall, dignified man carrying a bishop's crozier and accompanied by two companions, forded the river Great Ouse and announced to the villagers that his name was Ivo, and that he was a missionary. He added that he had been ordered by God to travel to Slepe where he was to make his home and preach the gospel in the surrounding area. The eleventh-century chronicler Goscelin of St Bertin wrote that Ivo was a Persian archbishop, and this claim has been repeated in later reports. Ivo remained at Slepe and eventually died there in the seventh century.

In the tenth century, Ramsey Abbey was founded and in 986, the Manor of Slepe, which by that time was an extensive property, was bequeathed to the Abbey. In the year 1001 CE, a peasant ploughing a field discovered a stone coffin containing a complete human skeleton. It was taken back to the church at Slepe, and declared by the Abbot Eadnoth, to be the remains of Ivo. At the time it was a lucrative matter for an Abbey to possess the bones of a saint, as wealthy pilgrims were attracted to the location. The relics were claimed to have healing properties. The editors of the Dictionary of Christian Biography describe the legend of Ivo as utterly improbable, "and the monks of Ramsey must be held responsible for the legend. Their abbey had been newly built and needed relics; a consecrated spot was wanted for a daughter-house [at Slepe]".

Ivo was a Cornish saint. Suggestions of a Persian link came about when Withman, Abbot of Ramsey, heard in the Holy Land of a Persian bishop named Ivo; subsequently the link to the Fenland Ivo was written down by Goscelin of St Bertin. The tradition is completely spurious. There is a seaside town in Cornwall named St Ives. That name derives from a holy woman named Ia of Cornwall and has no connection with the Cambridgeshire town's name.

Nevertheless, Slepe became an important destination for pilgrims, and in time the name used for the settlement became "Saint Ives". The presence of the remains gave Slepe considerable prestige. Ramsey Abbey had been established in AD974 with a charter from King Edgar, and the community at Slepe was made subordinate to Ramsey Abbey. The significance of Ivo's remains meant that the community at Slepe became referred to as St Ives. About 1001 CE Abbot Eadnoth had Ivo's remains moved to Ramsey, but by that time the name St Ives had become the usual name for the town that had originated as Slepe.

=== After the Norman Conquest ===
Slepe was listed in the Hundred of Hurstingstone in Huntingdonshire in the Domesday Book. It states that

In St Ives, the Abbot of Ramsey had 20 hides to the geld [taxable]. [There is] land for 24 ploughs, and he had land for 2 ploughs in demesne, apart from the aforementioned hides. There are now 3 ploughs in demesne and 39 villains and 12 smallholders who have 20 [or 6?] ploughs. There is a church and a priest, and 60 acres of meadow [and] woodland pasture 1 league and a half broad. Value before 1066 was £20 and now £16. Three of the Abbot's men, Everard, Ingelrann and Pleines, have 4 hides of this land, and 3½ ploughs. 5 villagers and 6 smallholders with 3 ploughs. [They have] the church and the priest. Value 45s. Eustace claims 2½ ploughs. Note: merged from differing translations of the original text in Latin.

Burn-Murdoch explains that "A hide was an area of land, probably about 120 acres. Land "in lordship" was cultivated by the lord of the manor as his own Home Farm. Villeins and borderers were different kinds of peasant. A league was probably about one and a half miles. The Eustace who claims some of the land was the sheriff of Huntingdonshire.

As St Ives continued to be a focus for travel in the area, it developed in importance as a trading point and a staging point for travellers. In 1107 the ford crossing of the river was replaced by a wooden bridge, at the site of the present-day stone bridge. The wooden bridge further encouraged the importance of St Ives, but it incurred heavy maintenance costs and in the early 15th century it was decided to replace the wooden bridge with a stone bridge; this was completed in 1426.

=== Post-medieval St Ives ===
The key position of St Ives on a trunk route from Huntingdon to Ipswich may be seen in John Ogilby's Britannia (1675), a series of strip maps of roads.

In 1689 there was a disastrous fire in the town which destroyed much of the built up infrastructure; Pettis was an eye-witness:

Tuesday april 30 hear happened a sudden and dreadfull fire in a malt house at the end of Whithart lane next padlemore. The wind being very high it ran up to the Street flew cross the Sheep market, consuming all to the reverside with part of the Bridg Street and to the other side the bridg consum’d part of them two houses.

The economy of the town was principally agricultural, more arable than livestock. Carter says that

The major crops of the hinterland were wheat and barley, but the corn market of St Neots was more important than that of St Ives... However, there are references to fifteen granaries attached to inns in the eighteenth century which suggests that the crop was traded from them before transport to St Neots or elsewhere. There were large numbers of maltsters, some of whom became wealthy men.

Carter continues:

For all the benefits that the market and increased traffic on the river brought to the town it did not lead to the establishment of major new industries. Such information as we have shows that the cargoes earned by river were not produced in St Ives.

From the 17th to the mid-19th century, St Ives remained a hub for trade and navigation in this part of East Anglia. There were inns to cater for the merchants, mariners and drovers who did business in the town. Goods were brought into the town on barges and livestock rested on the last fattening grounds before being sent to London's Smithfield Market. However, with the opening of the Cambridge and St Ives railway line in 1847, and improvements to the local road networks, commercial traffic on the River Great Ouse entered a steady decline.

The commercial activity of St Ives was dominated by agriculture: its weekly cattle market was said to be second only to Smithfield Market, in London. Situated on the drove road from the north of England and southern Scotland, it was a convenient market to sell beasts to meat wholesalers of southern and eastern counties.

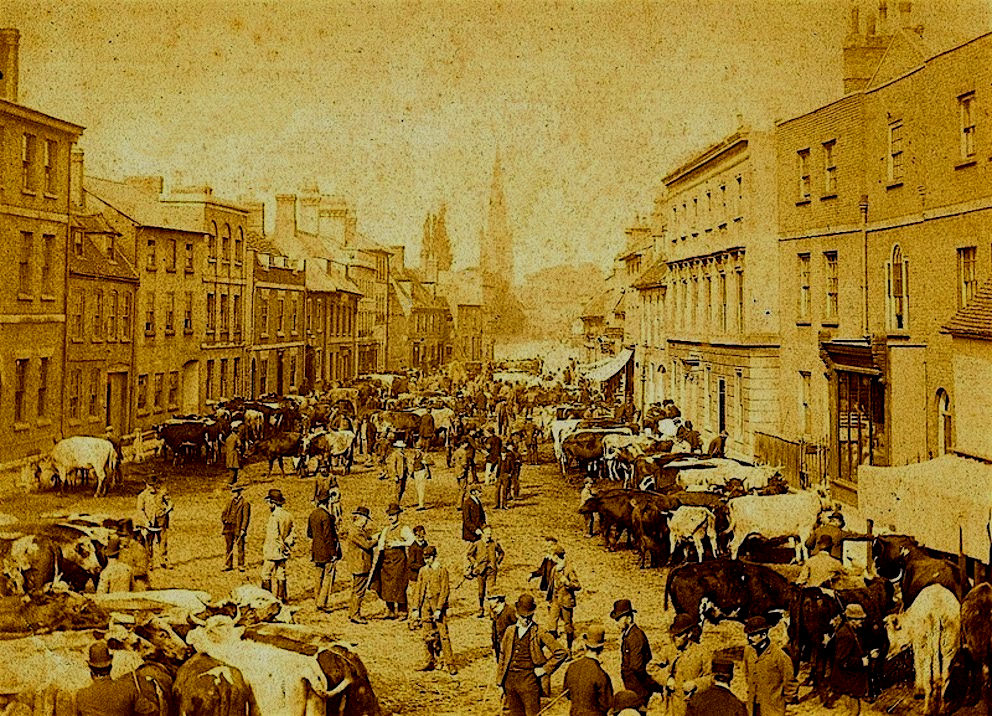
The cattle market in progress in Broad Street, before the move

The cattle market had, for decades, been held in Broad Street, but in 1886 it was moved to a dedicated site adjacent to the railway station.

Nevertheless, the town did have some industries as well. The company Tom M Scotney Limited established itself in St Ives in 1916, having operated on a small scale in Sawtry. The business manufactured timber products for agricultural use: sheep and cattle troughs, and fencing. After World War II the range was extended to include poultry houses, piggeries, farm carts and trailers, and motor lorry motor bodies. The original ownership was sold on in the 1960s and manufacturing ceased in the mid-1990s.

Joseph Fowell had established himself as a designer of steam engines for agricultural use, employed at the engineering company of Charles Burrell & Sons. In 1876 he set up independently in St Ives, chosen because of its agricultural commerce. He became associated with William Box who was patentee of a transmission system allowing sprung suspension of traction engines, at the time a novel concept. The company was mainly involved in the manufacture and repair of agricultural machinery. In 1923 the business was sold on, the new owner continuing to at least 1965.

After 1846 Potto Brown established a flour mill, that became known as Brown and Goodman's Steam Corn Mill. In 1902 the mill was sold to the Chivers Company of Histon. They converted the mill to a printing works for their jam jar labels. A subsidiary company named Enderby and Co. Ltd. was set up. Later the company supplied any business requiring its services. The works closed down in 1965. In 1968 the mill building was taken over by Advanced Instrumentation Modules, an electronics manufacturer. Clive Sinclair was the next occupier of the mill, in 1971, manufacturing pioneering microprocessor devices.

The factors that held the town back from further urban growth were that it lacked an industrial base, and had no monopoly to exploit except the sale of livestock, a trade whose major profits went to outsiders, like the Duke of Manchester. River traffic, largely controlled by outsiders, had to compete with traffic by road, and the more important centre for transport and many other aspects of life was the nearby county town of Huntingdon.

The River Great Ouse at St Ives flooded in 1947, and some parts suffered seriously again at Easter 1998 and in January 2003. Extensive flood protection works were carried out on both sides of the river in 2006–07 at a cost of nearly £9 million. 500 metres (1,600 ft) of brick-clad steel-piling was installed to protect the town, most noticeably at the Waits, where a plaza has also been created. A further 750 metres (2,460 ft) on the other side of the river protects Hemingford Grey, reducing the yearly risk of flooding from 10% to 1%. Building on the flood plain at St Ives is now discouraged.

== Governance ==
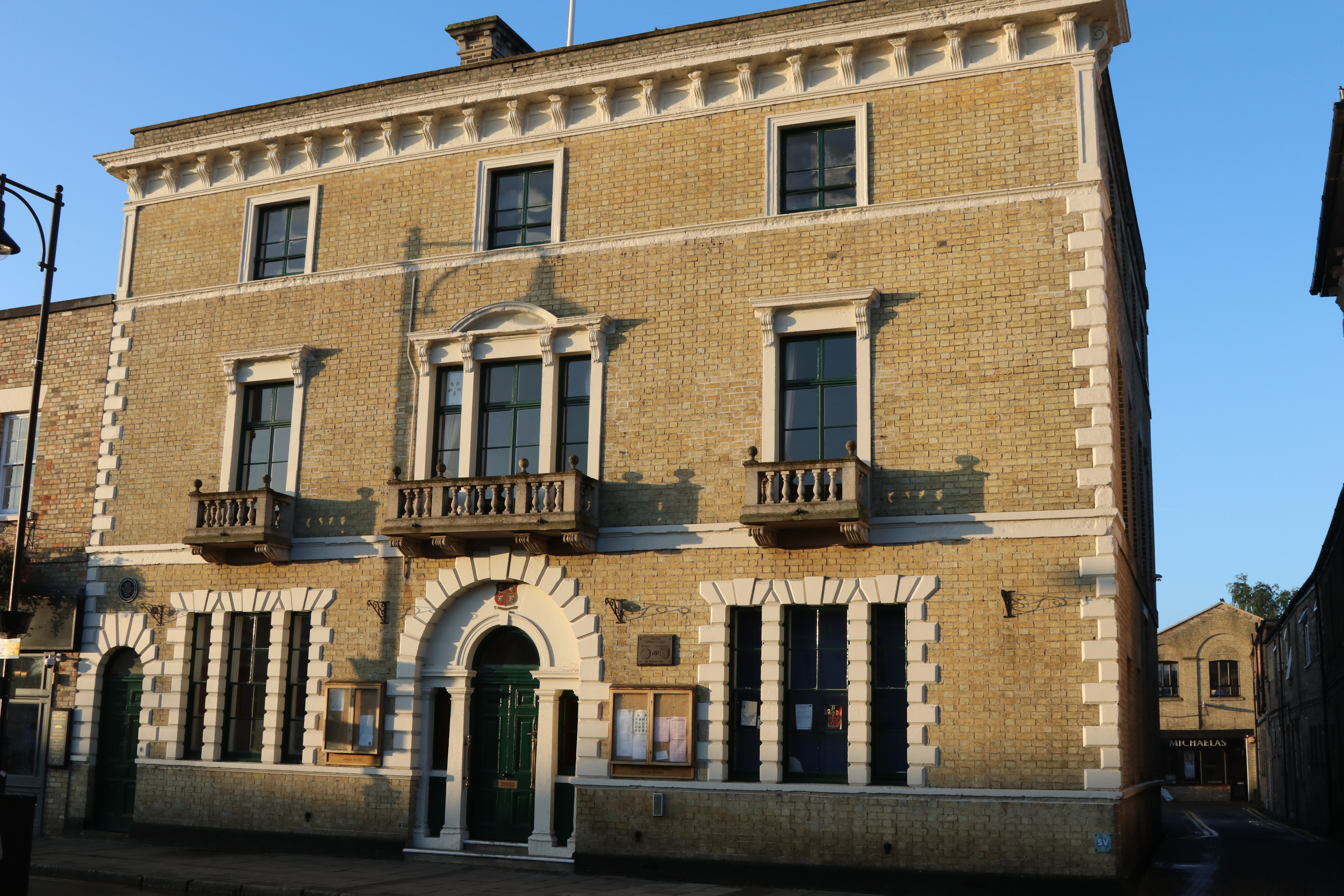
St Ives Town Hall

As a civil parish, St Ives has a town council, based at St Ives Town Hall, consisting of seventeen councillors including a Town Mayor and a deputy Town Mayor. The second tier of local government is Huntingdonshire District Council, a non-metropolitan district of Cambridgeshire. St Ives has three district wards for the district council; St Ives East, St Ives South, and St Ives West. St Ives East and St Ives South are both represented by two district councillors, and St Ives West is represented on the district council by one councillor. For St Ives the highest tier of local government is Cambridgeshire County Council. St Ives is part of the electoral division of St Ives and is represented on the county council by two councillors.

St Ives was in the historic and administrative county of Huntingdonshire until 1965. From 1965, the town was part of the new administrative county of Huntingdon and Peterborough. In 1974, following the Local Government Act 1972, St Ives became a part of the county of Cambridgeshire.

At Westminster St Ives is in the parliamentary constituency of Huntingdon, and since 2024 has been represented in the House of Commons by Ben Obese-Jecty (Conservative).

== Geography ==
The Saxon village of Slepe was located where the present-day All Saints Church stands. Parts of the church date from the 12th century, and Burn-Murdoch suggests that a Saxon church preceded it. Village residents would have farmed the sloping land lying to the north of that point. The present-day London Road south of the river leads straight to the river bank, and this implies a river crossing. This is likely to have been a ford, but there may also have been a ferry. The river is wide and shallow, with a gravel bottom, making it ideal for a ford, in contrast to the muddy bottom at Slepe itself. As this was a convenient river-crossing, onward travel routes radiated to Ramsey, Somersham and Needingworth.

The geology of St Ives is that a thick band of Oxford clay dominates to the north west, but a small branch of Ampthill clay exists immediately north of the town, and more broadly to the east. At the end of the ice age, meltwater brought boulders and stones down the Ouse Valley and formed extensive gravel deposits in the region.

== Demography ==
=== Population ===
In the period 1801 to 1901 the population of St Ives was recorded every ten years by the UK census. During this time the population was in the range of 2,099 (the lowest was in 1801) and 3,572 (the highest was in 1851).

From 1901, a census was taken every ten years with the exception of 1941 (due to the Second World War).

Parish	1911	1921	1931	1951	1961	1971	1981	1991	2001	2011	2021
St Ives	3,015	2,797	2,664	3,078	4,082	7,148	12,331	14,930	16,001	16,384	16,815
All population census figures from report Historic Census figures Cambridgeshire to 2021.

In 2011, the parish covered an area of 2,688 acres (1,088 hectares) and the population density of St Ives in 2011 was 3,901 persons per square mile (1,506 persons per square kilometre).

== Economy ==
There is a twice-weekly street market in the town centre (on Mondays and Fridays), and it is slightly enhanced on the May and August Bank Holidays. There is also a Farmers' Market on the first and third Saturday every month.

St. Ives Carnival and Music Festival 2025 is planned for July and a Michaelmas Fair has been organised.

The Times newspaper commented in 2022:

St Ives retains its traditional feel, with regular markets every Monday and Friday, plus a twice-monthly farmers’ market. There’s an excellent small art gallery (VK Gallery), which features works by established contemporary artists and new talents, while the independent shops increasingly promote sustainability. Recent openings include the Explore Zero Waste refill shop and the Filling Station — the latter is a craft beer shop and taproom that allows customers to refill US-style one- and two-litre beer growlers with their beer of choice (there are more than 200 to try).

== Places of worship ==
=== Parish church ===
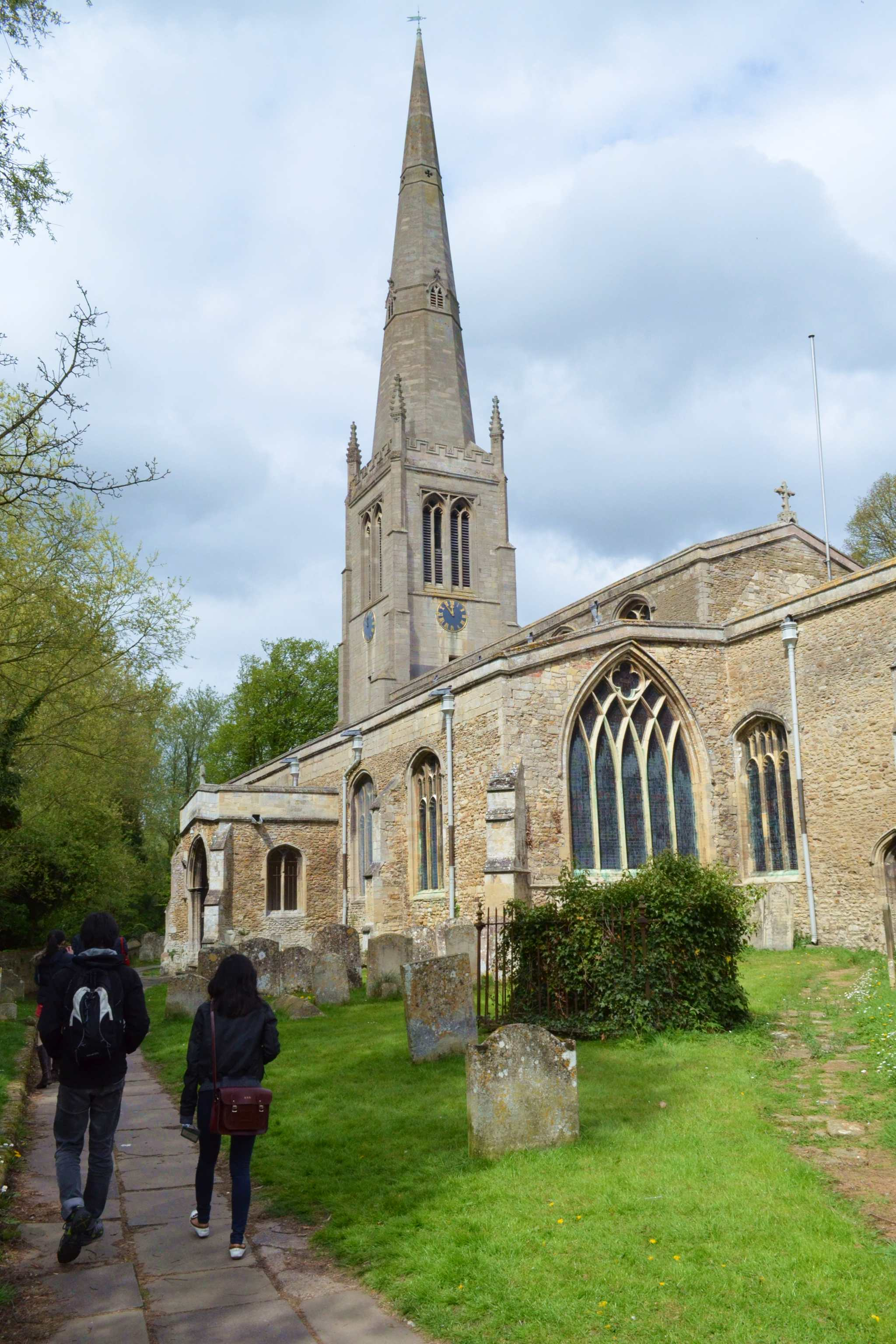
All Saints parish church

The Anglican parish church in St Ives is All Saints Church, located on Church Street, to the west of the present-day town centre. It was founded in AD 970, and it has been a Grade I listed building since 1951. It was originally the parish church of the settlement of Slepe, before St Ives came into existence. As it stands today, it dates largely from the rebuilding of the late 15th century. It was extensively reordered in the late 19th century by Sir Ninian Comper.

In 1980 John Betjeman described it as "Riverine setting, Stately Perpendicular with rich painted rood screen; loft and organ case on it, all by Comper." It has the unique annual custom of "dicing for bibles" where children play a game of dice to try to win a Bible, a tradition established in the will of the poet Robert Wild (poet) .

In his 2009 book England's Thousand Best Churches, Simon Jenkins awards the church one star, saying: "Its glory is its steeple, high, elegant and with a gracefully tapering spire. Like most English spires it has been much rebuilt, most recently in 1918 when an aeroplane knocked it through the nave roof. The view from the south-east is best, with the tower rising above Intersecting tracery."

Of the interior, Jenkins says: "St Ives's font is Norman, with intersecting arches on attached columns. The blocked piscina in the south aisle is a gem of Early Gothic, a round dogtoothed arch with two intersecting chamfered arches. There is an admirable Kempe window in the chancel south wall."

=== Other places of worship ===
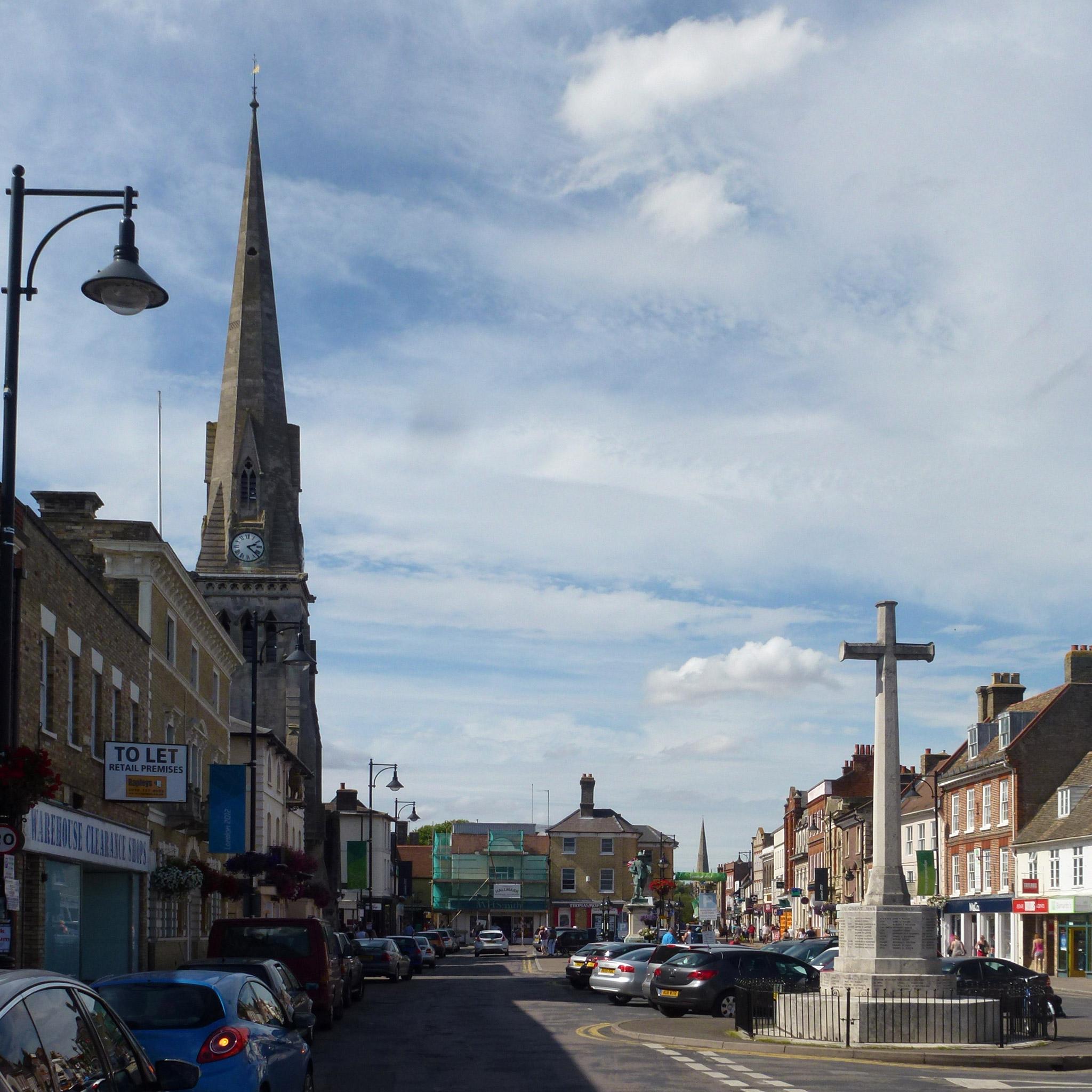
The Free Church and Market Hill

At the present day, the town centre is dominated by The Free Church, a United Reformed Church. It was built at the side of Market Hill in 1864 in response to the desire of the townspeople to have a more central place of worship. It was modernised in 1980, when the worship area was relocated at a higher level.

The principal Roman Catholic church in St Ives is the Church of the Sacred Heart on Needingworth Road. The structure was originally built by Augustus Pugin in Cambridge, but it was dismantled in 1902 and relocated to St Ives.

Adherents of the Sunni Muslim faith gather at the Faizan E Madina Masjid mosque.

Gateway House is a prominent, Grade II listed historic building located on Chapel Lane in the town centre, It was originally built in 1691 as a Society of Friends (Quaker) Meeting House but ceased this role in 1945. Quakers now meet once a month in the free Church.

== Public houses ==
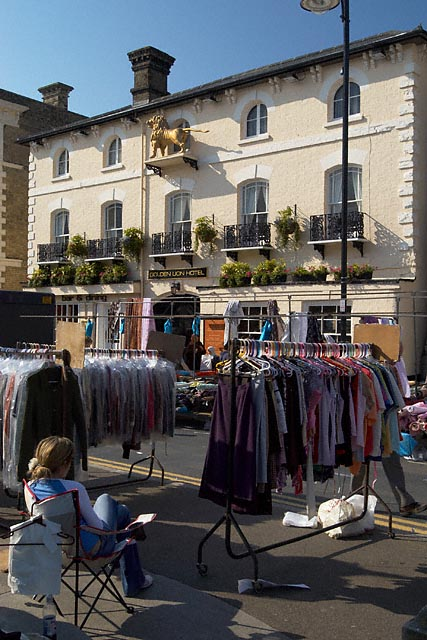
The Golden Lion, a former coaching inn

As an important market town, St Ives always needed large numbers of public houses, many of which were bawdy houses: 64 in 1838 (1 for every 55 inhabitants), 60 in 1861, 48 in 1865 and 45 in 1899, although only five of these made the owners a living. As livestock sales diminished, however, so did the need for large numbers of pubs, falling to a low point of 16 in 1962. In that year the Seven Wives on Ramsey Road was opened. The oldest name is the Dolphin; in use on the same site for over 300 years, its current usage is for a hotel built in 1985. Next oldest is the White Hart, which is pre-1720. Nelson's Head and Golden Lion are at least as old but have not kept the same name: they used to be called the Three Tuns and the Red Lion respectively. There has been a pub on the site of the Robin Hood from a similar date; in fact it was originally two separate pubs: the Angel and the Swan. A pub under the name Swan and Angel was opened by J D Wetherspoon. The claim of the Royal Oak to date from 1502 cannot be proven since, while a portion at the back is 17th-century (making it physically the oldest portion of any pub in St Ives), the pub name is more recent. The reference is to Charles II's famous escape from Cromwell's Roundheads, and Charles was restored to the throne in 1660.

The Golden Lion was a 19th-century coaching inn. The Official Guide to the Great Eastern Railway referred to it in 1893 as one of two "leading hotels" in St Ives and there are a number of ghost stories associated with the pub.

== Landmarks ==
=== St Ives Bridge and Chapel ===
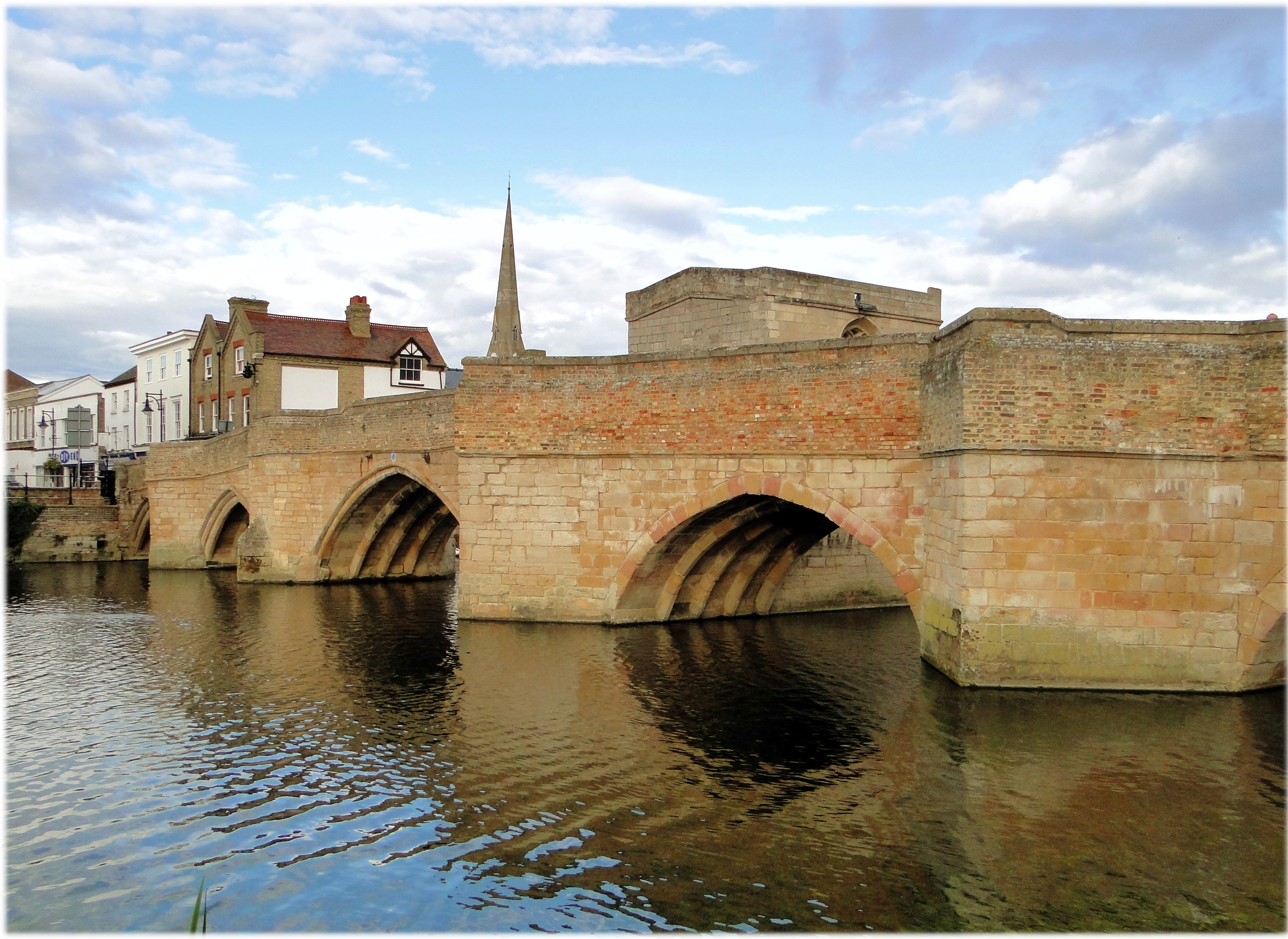
St Ives bridge looking north towards the Free Church

St Ives Bridge is located on the south side of the town, and gave access to London Road, crossing the River Great Ouse. It is unusual in incorporating a chapel. A first bridge at the site was constructed of wood, in the early twelfth century. It was replaced by the present stone structure in 1426. During the English Civil War Parliamentary troops demolished the two southern arches to prevent Royalist soldiers from reaching London by this route. For a period afterwards, a wooden drawbridge was used to span the gap, but 1716 the two demolished arches were reconstructed. They were designed as segmental arches, not matching the Gothic shape of the four surviving 1426 arches.

Although the roadway is only 12 ft 6in wide, the bridge continued to be the only direct road access to the south until 1980 when the St Ives by-pass was inaugurated.

The chapel on the centre pier was dedicated to St Leger in 1426. After the dissolution of the monasteries, the chapel was deconsecrated in 1539, and was used as a private dwelling. An additional two storeys were added in 1736. In 1930 the structure was considered to be unsafe, and the additional storeys were removed; the remainder was restored. The chapel is still extant nowadays, and is in occasional use.

The bridge is forbidden to most road traffic, although an exemption is made for heavy goods vehicles weighing in excess of 3 tonnes which need access to the town center.

=== Statue of Oliver Cromwell ===
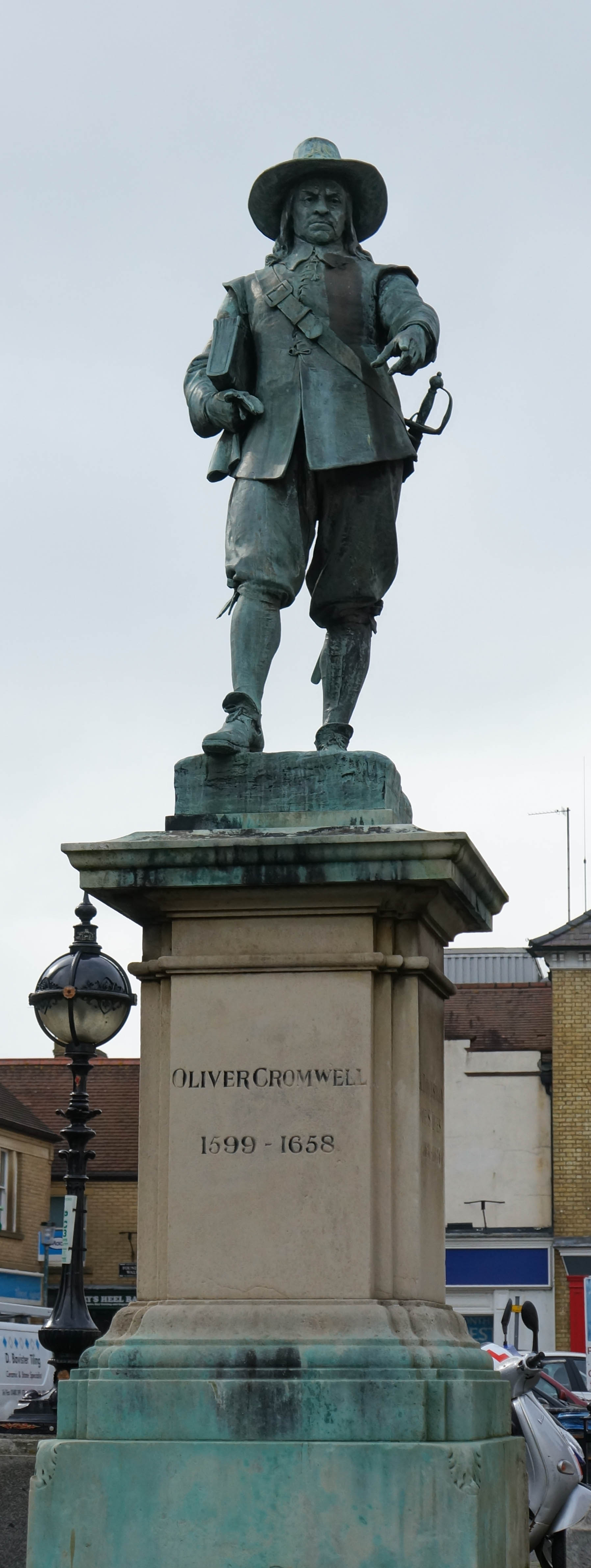
The Statue of Oliver Cromwell on Market Hill in the town centre

Oliver Cromwell (1599–1658) was an English military and political leader who rose to prominence during the English Civil War. Initially a member of Parliament, he led Parliamentary forces (Roundheads) against King Charles I, playing a key role in the king's execution in 1649. Cromwell helped establish the Commonwealth of England and later ruled as Lord Protector from 1653 until his death. A devout Puritan, he enforced strict religious and moral codes. His rule was marked by military campaigns in Ireland and Scotland, which remain controversial. Cromwell died in 1658, and the monarchy was restored two years later in 1660. The bronze statue is by F. W. Pomeroy and was erected in 1901.

=== The Corn Exchange ===
St Ives Corn Exchange is a Grade II listed building, first opened in 1864, built and paid for by local businessmen. It was extensively renovated in 2009 - 2010.

=== Holt Island ===
Holt Island is formed by the bifurcation of the River Great Ouse. A nature reserve is located on part of it, and there is a raised board walk, seats and picnic tables. There is an Information Room. Access is by a footbridge at the western end of the churchyard of All Saints Church. The Scout Association occupies the north-western end of the island.

== Culture ==
The Norris Museum was founded by Herbert Norris, who left his lifetime's collection of Huntingdonshire relics to the people of St Ives when he died in 1931. The Norris Museum holds a collection on local history, including a number of books written by its former curator, Bob Burn-Murdoch.

The museum was reopened in August 2017, following a £1.5m refurbishment and expansion; since 2020 its director has been Claire Hardy, and it is managed by the Norris Management Trust Group, made up of members of St Ives Town Council and the Friends of the Norris Museum.

Each year the town hosts a free 2-day carnival and music festival which was launched in 1999, as part of the committee set up for the millennium.

=== Sport ===
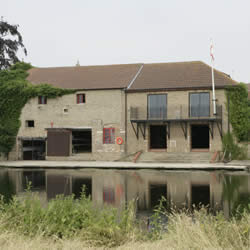
Boathouse of St Ives Rowing Club

There are two leisure facilities: St Ives Leisure Centre, operated by One Leisure and an outdoor centre, also operated by One Leisure.

St Ives also has a Rugby club on Somersham Road, and a non-league football club, St Ives Town F.C., which plays at Westwood Road.

St Ives Rowing Club was formed in 1865, was once captained by John Goldie and has had a number of members who have competed at Olympic and Commonwealth championships.

There is a swimming club and an 18-hole championship golf course.

== Education ==
St Ives has a main secondary school, St Ivo Academy and four primary schools: Eastfield, Thorndown, Westfield and Wheatfields.

== Media ==
Local news and television programmes are provided by BBC East and ITV Anglia. Television signals are received from the Sandy Heath TV transmitter.

Local radio stations are BBC Radio Cambridgeshire, Heart East, Greatest Hits Radio East, Star Radio and HCR FM a community based radio station that broadcast across the district of Huntingdonshire.

The Hunts Post is the town's local weekly newspaper.

== Transport ==
=== Buses ===
Buses operated by Stagecoach East on route 5 use the Cambridgeshire Guided Busway to connect St Ives to Cambridge and Trumpington Park and Ride; there is a frequent service. There are also journeys to Huntingdon and Hinchingbrooke Hospital.

Whippet route X3 (from Hinchingbrooke Hospital to Addenbrooke's Hospital via St Ives, Eltisley, Cambourne and Cambridge), and route X2, a truncated and infrequent route from Huntingdon to Cambridge via Trumpington Park and Ride). Whippet route 66 operates from Fenstanton via St Ives to St Neots.

In addition, Whippet operates a seasonal excursion service (route 101) to Hunstanton on summer weekends.

=== Road ===
St Ives is located in an area somewhat remote from trunk roads. The north–south A1 road is about ten miles to the west and the east–west A14 road, accessed by the A1307, is about five miles to the south. Cambridge is reached by that system.

=== Rail ===
The railhead for St Ives is Huntingdon station, which has trains for Peterborough and London, the latter continuing in most cases to Gatwick Airport. By changing trains at Peterborough, passengers can continue to destinations in Yorkshire and Scotland on the East Coast Main Line, and to Birmingham and the North West of England on Crosscountry services.

== Cultural references ==
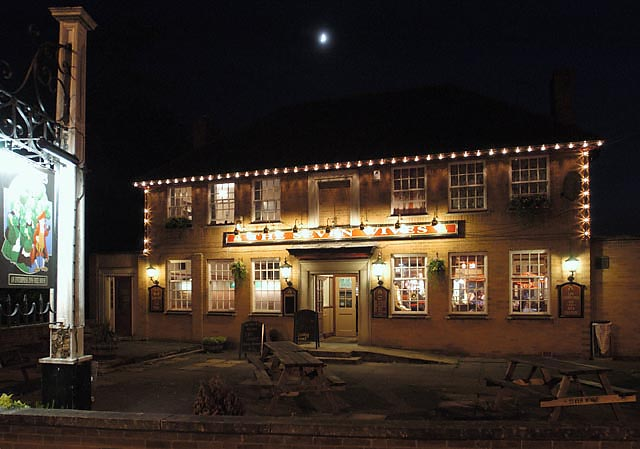
The Seven Wives pub on a summer's night

The town name is featured in the anonymous nursery rhyme/riddle "As I was going to St Ives". While sometimes claimed to be St Ives, Cornwall, the man with seven wives, each with seven sacks containing seven cats etc., may have been on his way to (or coming from) the Great Fair at St Ives. On Ramsey Road there is a public house called The Seven Wives, though this is a modern pub with no connection to the ancient rhyme other than the name.

Victorian philosopher Thomas Carlyle contrasted the workhouse in St Ives with the ruins of Bury St Edmunds Abbey in Past and Present (1843).

The famous war poet Rupert Brooke lived for a time at Grantchester. In his famous poem "The Old Vicarage, Grantchester" he heaped praise on his own village, but not on the shire town of Cambridge itself, or on the other villages around. Of St Ives he wrote:

Strong men have blanched and shot their wives, rather than send them to St Ives

== Notable residents ==
- Oliver Cromwell lived in St Ives between 1631 and 1636, at Old Slepe Hall.
- Paul Clammer, author of Lonely Planet guide to Afghanistan
- Leanne Jones (born 1985), actress, grew up in St Ives
- Bryony Kimmings (born 1981), performance artist, screenwriter
- James Page (born 1986), singer-songwriter, known professionally as Sivu
- Sir Clive Sinclair (1940–2021), home computing pioneer, made the first pocket calculator in the Old Mill, St Ives

=== Sport ===
- Scott Barron (born 1985), ex-Brentford retired footballer
- Joe Bugner (1950–2025), Heavyweight boxer, lived in the town after leaving Hungary. He challenged for the world heavyweight titles against Muhammad Ali and now lives in Brisbane, Queensland.
- John Ruddy (born 1986), born locally, Newcastle United football goalkeeper
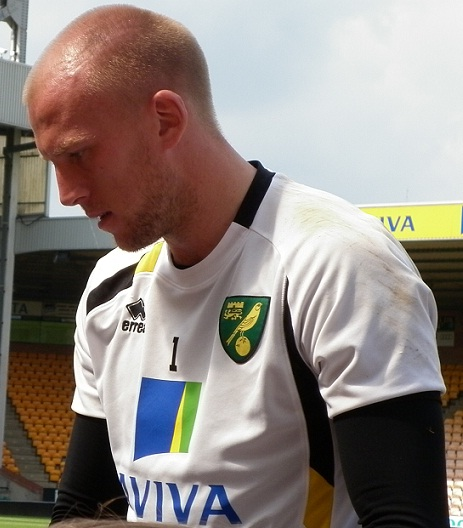
  John Ruddy, 2012
