= Bastille discography =

Artist discography

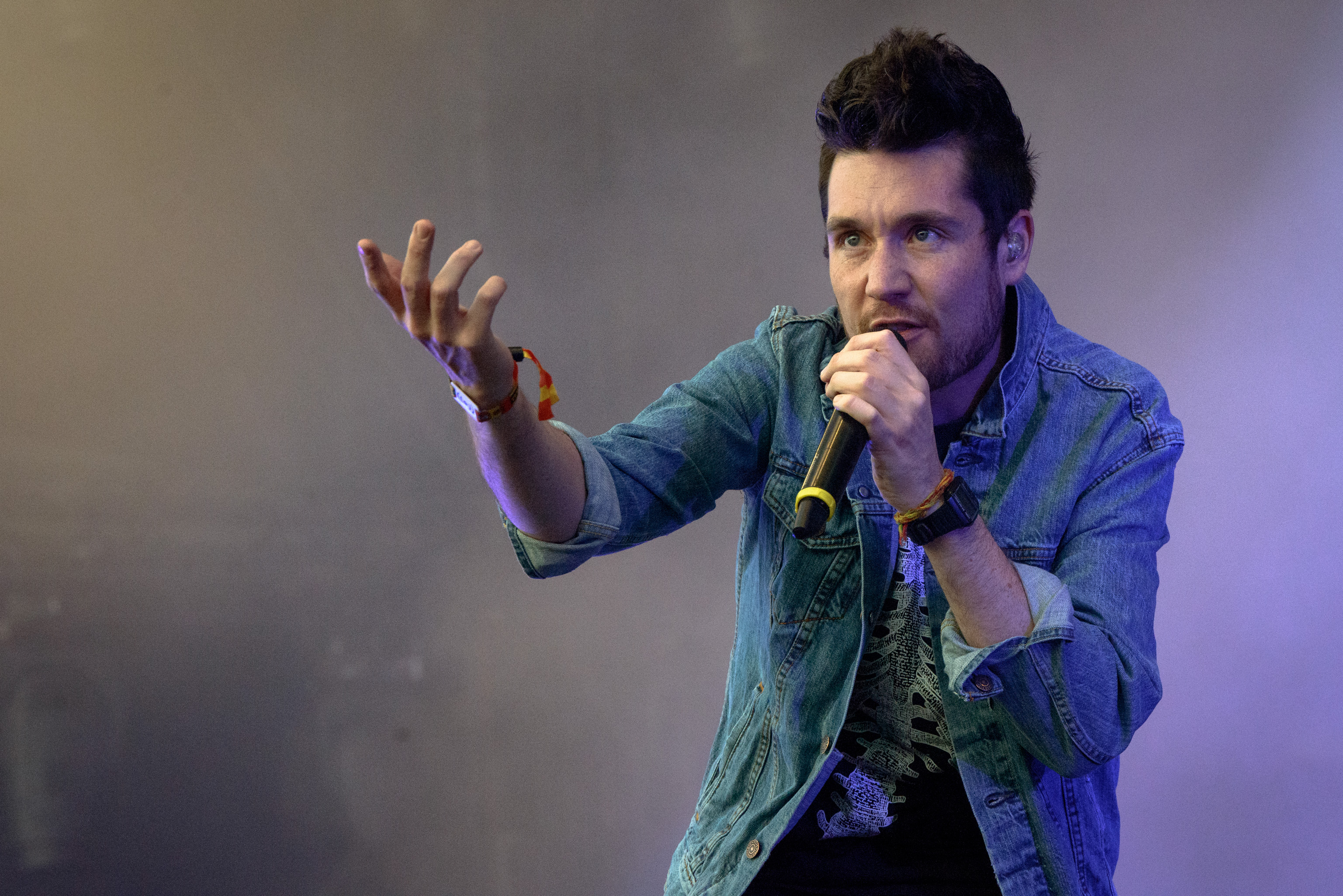
- Bastille's founder and lead singer, Dan Smith, performing at Lollapalooza in 2015
- Studio albums: 5
- EPs: 12
- Live albums: 1
- Singles: 33
- B-sides: 8
- Music videos: 33
- Mixtapes: 4
- Remixes: 8
- Re-Issues: 3

The discography of Bastille, a British indie pop band, consists of five studio albums, one live album, twelve extended plays, thirty-three singles and thirty-one music videos. Originally a solo project by Dan Smith, Bastille was formed in 2010. The band released its debut single "Flaws" / "Icarus" in July 2011 on the independent record label Young and Lost Club. An extended play titled Laura Palmer followed later that year. The critical success of the EP and extensive touring brought the group to the attention of Virgin Records, which signed them in December 2011.

Bastille released their debut studio album, Bad Blood, in March 2013. The album reached number one on the United Kingdom albums chart and the top ten of the Irish albums chart. It has been certified triple platinum by the British Phonographic Industry (BPI) and platinum by the Recording Industry Association of America (RIAA). The band released six singles from the album: "Overjoyed", "Bad Blood", "Flaws", "Pompeii", "Laura Palmer", and "Things We Lost in the Fire", with "Pompeii" peaking at number two on the UK Singles Chart and topping the charts in Ireland and Scotland. "Pompeii" reached number five on the Billboard Hot 100 and has been certified 6× Platinum by the RIAA.

In November 2013, Bastille released a re-issue album All This Bad Blood, which features songs from the extended edition of Bad Blood and their mixtapes, as well as two new songs. The band released two singles from the album: "Oblivion" and "Of the Night", a mash-up of the songs "The Rhythm of the Night" by Corona and "Rhythm Is a Dancer" by Snap!.

On 8 December 2014, Bastille released their third mixtape, VS. (Other People's Heartache, Pt. III), which included collaborations with Haim ("Bite Down"), Angel Haze ("Weapon"), MNEK ("bad_news"), Grades ("Torn Apart"), and Rag'n'Bone Man and Skunk Anansie ("Remains").

On 16 June 2016 "Good Grief" was released and went on to reach number 13 on the UK Singles Chart and is certified Platinum. The album, Wild World, was released on 9 September and reached number one on the UK Albums Chart for two consecutive weeks. It reached number two in Belgium and Ireland, and top 5 in Austria, Switzerland and US. Three more singles were released from the album: "Send Them Off!", "Blame" and "Glory".

"I Know You", Craig David featuring Bastille, was released as the second single from David's seventh album, The Time Is Now on 23 November 2017. It reached number 5 on the UK Singles Chart and number 2 in Scotland.

"Happier", a collaboration with Marshmello, was released on 17 August 2018. It reached number two on the UK Singles Chart, tying with "Pompeii" and "Of the Night", and number two in the US, eclipsing "Pompeii". It reached the top 5 in Australia, Ireland and Sweden amongst others. It is certified double platinum by the BPI, and six-times platinum by the RIAA and the Australian Recording Industry Association (ARIA).

On 7 December 2018, Bastille released their fourth mixtape, Other People's Heartache, Pt. 4, which included collaborations with: Kianja ("Wild World (Intro)"); Kianja, Craig David and S-X ("Would I Lie to You?"); Seeb ("Grip"); Kianja, Craig David and Swarmz ("Don't Let Go (Love)"); Rationale, James Arthur ("Flowers"); Lily Moore, Moss Kena and Jacob Banks ("The Descent"); and Moss Kena ("Warmth (Outro)").

The band's third studio album, Doom Days, was released on 14 June 2019, preceded by four singles: "Quarter Past Midnight", "Doom Days", "Joy" and "Those Nights". The album reached top 5 in both the UK and USA. The album was re-issued as an extended album, Doom Days (This Got Out of Hand), on 6 December 2019. Two singles have been released since, a duet with Canadian singer Alessia Cara of their song "Another Place" and "Can't Fight This Feeling", a cover of the REO Speedwagon song, with the latter becoming the band's ninth UK top 40 single.

In July 2024, Bastille announced a new four-part project title "&". The first part of the project was released in full on 24 October 2024.

== Albums ==
=== Studio albums ===
List of studio albums, with selected chart positions and certifications
Title	Details	Peak chart positions										Sales	Certifications
Title	Details	UK	AUS	AUT	BEL	CAN	GER	IRL	NZ	SWI	US	Sales	Certifications
Bad Blood	Released: 4 March 2013 (UK); Labels: Virgin, EMI; Formats: CD, LP, digital download, streaming	1	10	31	6	19	23	5	28	15	11	UK: 1,065,681 (Note: Sales of Bad Blood in the United Kingdom as of August 2023.); WW: 6,000,000 (Note: Sales of Bad Blood worldwide as of November 2020.)	BPI: 3× Platinum; ARIA: Gold; BEA: Gold; BVMI: Platinum; IFPI AUT: Platinum; IRMA: Gold; MC: Gold; RIAA: Platinum
Wild World	Released: 9 September 2016; Labels: Virgin, EMI; Formats: CD, LP, digital download, streaming	1	7	5	2	7	6	2	12	5	4	UK: 227,836 (Note: Sales of Wild World in the United Kingdom as of January 2022.)	BPI: Gold
Doom Days	Released: 14 June 2019; Label: Virgin EMI; Formats: CD, LP, digital download, streaming	4	21	10	5	30	9	18	30	8	5	UK: 95,186 (Note: Sales of Doom Days in the United Kingdom as of January 2022.)	BPI: Gold
Give Me the Future	Released: 4 February 2022; Label: EMI; Formats: CD, LP, digital download, streaming	1	69	30	15	—	15	96	—	28	110	UK: 19,906 (Note: Sales of Give Me the Future in the United Kingdom as of February 2022.)	BPI: Silver
"&"	Released: 25 October 2024; Label: Best Laid Plans, EMI; Formats: CD, LP, digital download, streaming	4	—	—	9	—	31	—	—	—	—		
"—" denotes a recording that did not chart or was not released in that territory.

=== Re-issues ===
List of compilation albums, with selected chart positions
Title	Details	Peak chart positions						Certifications
Title	Details	DEN	FIN	GER	ITA	NZ	SWI	Certifications
All This Bad Blood	Released: 25 November 2013 (UK); Labels: Virgin, EMI; Formats: CD, 2LP, digital download, streaming	25	27	26	52	19	66	IFPI DEN: Gold; RMNZ: 2× Platinum
Doom Days (This Got Out of Hand)	Released: 6 December 2019; Label: Virgin EMI; Formats: streaming	—	—	—	—	—	—	
Give Me the Future + Dreams of the Past	Released: 26 August 2022; Label: Virgin EMI; Formats: CD, 2LP, digital download, streaming	—	—	—	—	—	—	
"—" denotes a recording that did not chart or was not released in that territory.

=== Live albums ===
List of live albums, with selected details
Title	Details
MTV Unplugged	Released: 22 April 2023; Label: Virgin, EMI; Formats: LP, digital download, streaming

=== Compilation albums ===
List of compilation albums, with selected details
Title	Details
From All Sides: Songs from the First Fifteen Years	Released: 5 November 2025; Label: Virgin, EMI; Formats: LP

=== Remix albums ===
List of remix albums, with selected chart positions
Title	Details	Peak chart positions
Title	Details	US Dance
Remixed	Released: 22 October 2013 (US); Label: Virgin; Formats: LP, digital download	21

=== Mixtapes ===
List of mixtapes, with selected chart positions
Title	Details	Peak chart positions			
Title	Details	UK	US	US Alt.	US Rock
Other People's Heartache	Released: February 2012 (UK); Format: Digital download	—	—	—	—
Other People's Heartache, Pt. 2	Released: December 2012 (UK); Format: Digital download	—	—	—	—
VS. (Other People's Heartache, Pt. III)	Released: 8 December 2014; Formats: CD, LP, digital download, streaming	45	87	8	12
Other People's Heartache, Pt. 4	Released: 7 December 2018 (UK); Formats: Digital download, streaming, LP, cassette	—	—	—	—
"—" denotes a recording that did not chart or was not released in that territory.

== Extended plays ==
List of extended plays, with selected chart positions
Title	Details	Peak chart positions		
Title	Details	US	US Alt.	US Rock
Laura Palmer EP	Released: 14 November 2011 (UK); Label: Self-released; Formats: CD, digital download	—	—	—
Daytrotter Session	Released: 22 May 2012; Label: Daytrotter; Formats: Digital download	—	—	—
iTunes Festival: London 2012	Released: 11 September 2012 (UK); Label: Virgin; Formats: Digital download	—	—	—
Live at Koko	Released: 24 February 2013 (UK); Label: Virgin; Formats: Digital download	—	—	—
Haunt	Released: 28 May 2013 (US); Label: Virgin; Formats: CD, LP, digital download	104	21	29
iTunes Festival: London 2013	Released: 27 September 2013 (UK); Label: Virgin; Formats: Streaming	—	—	—
Live in Mexico City 2014	Released: 2014 (US); Label: Virgin; Format: Streaming	—	—	—
Spotify Live	Released: 2017 (US); Label: Virgin; Format: Streaming	—	—	—
Apple Music Festival: London 2016	Released: 26 May 2017 (US); Label: Virgin; Format: Streaming	—	—	—
Goosebumps	Released: 4 December 2020; Label: Virgin; Format: Streaming	—	—	—
Roots of ReOrchestrated	Released: 19 March 2021; Label: Virgin; Format: Streaming	—	—	—
Drink	Released: 23 April 2021; Label: Virgin; Format: Streaming	—	—	—
Apple Music Home Session: Bastille	Released: 3 December 2021; Label: Virgin; Format: Streaming	—	—	—
"&", Part One	Released: 26 July 2024; Label: EMI; Format: Streaming	—	—	—
"&", Part Two	Released: 13 September 2024; Label: EMI; Format: Streaming	—	—	—
Bastille Presents “&”: City Sessions (Amazon Music Live)	Released: 6 December 2024; Label: EMI; Format: Streaming	—	—	—
"&", Part Four	Released: 15 August 2025; Label: EMI; Format: LP, streaming	—	—	—
"—" denotes a recording that did not chart or was not released in that territory.

== Singles ==
=== As lead artist ===
List of singles, with selected chart positions and certifications, showing year released and album name
Title	Year	Peak chart positions										Certifications	Album
Title	Year	UK	AUS	AUT	BEL	GER	IRL	NZ	SWE	SWI	US	Certifications	Album
"Flaws" / "Icarus"	2011	—	—	—	—	—	—	—	—	—	—		Bad Blood
"Overjoyed"	2012	—	—	—	—	—	—	—	—	—	—		Bad Blood
"Bad Blood"	2012	90	—	—	55	—	—	—	—	— (Note: "Bad Blood" did not enter the Swiss Singles chart, but charted at number 95 on the Swiss Airplay chart.)	95	BPI: Silver; RIAA: Gold	Bad Blood
"Flaws"	2012	21	—	—	57	—	—	—	—	— (Note: "Flaws" did not enter the Swiss Singles chart, but charted at number 63 on the Swiss Airplay chart.)	— (Note: "Flaws" did not enter the Billboard Hot 100, but peaked at number 22 on the Bubbling Under Hot 100 Singles chart.)	BPI: Gold; RIAA: Gold	Bad Blood
"Pompeii"	2013	2	4	3	3	6	1	8	6	5	5	BPI: 7× Platinum; ARIA: 9× Platinum; BEA: 2× Platinum; BVMI: 5× Gold; GLF: 7× Platinum; IFPI AUT: 3× Platinum; IFPI SWI: Gold; RIAA: 6× Platinum; RMNZ: 6× Platinum	Bad Blood
"Laura Palmer"	2013	42	26	—	12	—	29	—	—	—	—	BPI: Silver	Bad Blood
"Things We Lost in the Fire"	2013	28	—	18	10	18	33	19	—	53	—	BPI: Platinum; BVMI: Gold; IFPI AUT: Gold; RMNZ: Gold	Bad Blood
"Of the Night"	2013	2	6	15	39	10	2	28	39	19	—	BPI: Platinum; ARIA: 2× Platinum; BVMI: Gold; GLF: Platinum; IFPI AUT: Gold; RMNZ: Gold	All This Bad Blood
"Oblivion"	2014	82	—	—	—	—	—	—	—	—	—	BPI: Silver; RMNZ: Gold	Bad Blood
"Torn Apart" (featuring Grades)	2014	196	—	—	54	—	—	—	—	—	—		VS. (Other People's Heartache, Pt. III)
"Good Grief"	2016	13	—	33	20	46	53	— (Note: "Good Grief" did not enter the NZ Top 40 Singles Chart, but peaked at number six on the NZ Heatseekers Singles Chart.)	—	— (Note: "Good Grief" did not enter the Swiss Singles chart, but charted at number 50 on the Swiss Airplay chart.)	— (Note: "Good Grief" did not enter the Billboard Hot 100, but peaked at number 12 on the Bubbling Under Hot 100 Singles chart.)	BPI: 2× Platinum; BVMI: Gold; IFPI AUT: Gold; RMNZ: Platinum	Wild World
"Send Them Off!"	2016	76	—	—	50	—	—	— (Note: "Send Them Off!" did not enter the NZ Top 40 Singles Chart, but peaked at number nine on the NZ Heatseekers Singles Chart.)	—	—	—	BPI: Silver	Wild World
"Blame"	2016	—	—	—	—	—	—	—	—	—	—		Wild World
"Glory"	2017	—	—	—	75	—	—	—	—	—	—		Wild World
"World Gone Mad"	2017	66	—	—	36	—	—	—	99	78	—		Bright: The Album
"Quarter Past Midnight"	2018	65	—	—	29	—	—	—	—	—	—	BPI: Silver	Doom Days
"Happier" (with Marshmello)	2018	2	3	5	7	9	2	3	4	10	2	BPI: 4× Platinum; ARIA: 6× Platinum; BEA: Platinum; BVMI: 3× Gold; GLF: 3× Platinum; IFPI AUT: 3× Platinum; RIAA: Diamond; RMNZ: 7× Platinum	Non-album single
"Grip" (with Seeb)	2018	—	—	—	32	—	95	— (Note: "Grip" did not enter the NZ Top 40 Singles Chart, but peaked at number 16 on the NZ Hot Singles Chart.)	— (Note: "Grip" did not enter the Swedish Singellista Chart, but peaked at number three on the Swedish Heatseeker Chart.)	—	—		Other People's Heartache, Pt. 4
"Doom Days"	2019	65	—	—	73	—	—	—	—	—	—		Doom Days
"Joy"	2019	46	—	—	24	—	55	— (Note: "Joy" did not enter the NZ Top 40 Singles Chart, but peaked at number 33 on the NZ Hot Singles Chart.)	—	—	—	BPI: Silver	Doom Days
"Those Nights"	2019	—	—	—	— (Note: "Those Nights" did not enter the Flanders Ultratop 50, but charted as an "extra tip" on the Ultratip chart.)	—	—	— (Note: "Those Nights" did not enter the NZ Top 40 Singles Chart, but peaked at number 34 on the NZ Hot Singles Chart.)	—	—	—		Doom Days
"Another Place" (with Alessia Cara)	2019	—	—	—	— (Note: "Another Place" did not enter the Flanders Ultratop 50, but charted as an "extra tip" on the Ultratip chart.)	—	—	— (Note: "Another Place" did not enter the NZ Top 40 Singles Chart, but peaked at number 23 on the NZ Hot Singles Chart.)	— (Note: "Another Place" did not enter the Swedish Singellista Chart, but peaked at number 16 on the Swedish Heatseeker Chart.)	—	—		Doom Days (This Got Out of Hand)
"Can't Fight This Feeling" (featuring London Contemporary Orchestra)	2019	39	—	—	73	—	—	—	—	—	—		Doom Days (This Got Out of Hand)
"What You Gonna Do???" (featuring Graham Coxon)	2020	—	—	—	65	—	—	—	—	—	—		Goosebumps EP
"Survivin'"	2020	— (Note: "Survivin'" did not enter the UK Singles Chart but peaked at number 76 on the UK Sales Chart.)	—	—	54	—	—	—	—	—	—		Goosebumps EP
"Distorted Light Beam"	2021	—	—	—	—	—	—	—	—	—	—		Give Me the Future
"Give Me the Future"	2021	—	—	—	—	—	—	—	—	—	—		Give Me the Future
"Thelma + Louise"	2021	—	—	—	—	—	—	—	—	—	—		Give Me the Future
"No Bad Days"	2021	—	—	—	—	—	—	—	—	—	—		Give Me the Future
"Shut Off the Lights"	2022	— (Note: "Shut Off the Lights" did not enter the UK Singles Chart but peaked at number 76 on the UK Sales Chart.)	—	—	—	— (Note: "Shut Off the Lights" did not enter the German Singles Chart, but peaked at number 97 on the Deutsche Download Singles Chart.)	—	— (Note: "Shut Off the Lights" did not enter the NZ Top 40 Singles Chart, but peaked at number 29 on the NZ Hot Singles Chart.)	—	— (Note: "Shut Off the Lights" did not enter the Swiss Singles chart, but charted at number 63 on the Swiss Airplay chart.)	—		Give Me the Future
"Run Into Trouble" (with Alok)	2022	—	—	—	—	—	—	— (Note: "Run Into Trouble" did not enter the NZ Top 40 Singles Chart, but peaked at number 35 on the NZ Hot Singles Chart.)	—	—	—		Give Me the Future + Dreams of the Past
"Remind Me"	2022	—	—	—	—	—	—	—	—	—	—		Give Me the Future + Dreams of the Past
"Revolution"	2022	—	—	—	—	—	—	—	—	—	—		Give Me the Future + Dreams of the Past
"No Angels" (with Ella Eyre)	2023	—	—	—	—	—	—	—	—	—	—		Bad Blood X
"Head Down" (with Lost Frequencies)	2023	78	—	58	12	28	—	— (Note: "Head Down" did not enter the NZ Top 40 Singles Chart, but peaked at number 12 on the NZ Hot Singles Chart.)	—	87	—		All Stand Together
"Intros & Narrators"	2024	—	—	—	—	—	—	—	—	—	—		"&"
"Blue Sky & the Painter"	2024	— (Note: "Blue Sky & the Painter" did not enter the UK Singles Chart but peaked at number 65 on the UK Sales Chart.)	—	—	—	—	—	—	—	—	—		"&"
"Bathsheba & Him"	2025	—	—	—	—	—	—	—	—	—	—		"&" (Part 4)
"Save My Soul"	2025	— (Note: "Save My Soul" did not enter the UK Singles Chart but peaked at number 37 on the UK Sales Chart.)	—	—	—	—	—	—	—	—	—		Non-album single
"Feel Alive" (with Illenium and Dabin)	2026	—	—	—	—	—	—	—	—	—	—		Odyssey
"—" denotes a recording that did not chart or was not released in that territory.

=== As featured artist ===
List of singles, with selected chart positions and certifications, showing year released and album name
Title	Year	Peak chart positions										Certifications	Album
Title	Year	UK	AUS	AUT	BEL	GER	IRL	NZ	SCO	SWI	US	Certifications	Album
"Do They Know It's Christmas?" (as part of Band Aid 30)	2014	1	3	5	1	2	1	2	1	5	63	BPI: Gold	Non-album singles
"Bridge over Troubled Water" (as part of Artists for Grenfell)	2017	1	53	32	76	—	25	— (Note: "Bridge over Troubled Water" did not enter the NZ Top 40 Singles Chart, but peaked at number 4 on the NZ Hot Singles Chart.)	1	28	—	BPI: Gold	Non-album singles
"I Know You" (Craig David featuring Bastille)	2017	5	—	—	66	92	30	—	2	65	—	BPI: Platinum	The Time Is Now
"Times Like These" (as part of Live Lounge Allstars)	2020	1	—	—	89	—	64	— (Note: "Times Like These" did not enter the NZ Top 40 Singles Chart, but peaked at number 5 on the NZ Hot Singles Chart.)	1	—	— (Note: "Times Like These" did not enter the Billboard Hot 100, but peaked at number 18 on the Digital Song Sales chart.)	BPI: Silver	Non-album singles
"Liar Liar" (Dylan featuring Bastille)	2023	—	—	—	—	—	—	—	—	—	—		Non-album singles
"Lullaby" (as part of Together for Palestine)	2025	5	—	—	—	—	50	— (Note: "Lullaby" did not enter the NZ Top 40 Singles Chart, but peaked at number 6 on the NZ Hot Singles Chart.)	—	—	—		Non-album singles
"—" denotes a recording that did not chart or was not released in that territory.

=== Promotional singles ===
Title	Year	Album
"Hangin'"	2015	Doom Days (This Got Out of Hand)
"Overload"	2015	Kill Your Friends
"Comfort of Strangers"	2017	Doom Days (This Got Out of Hand)
"Warmth (Live from Elbphilharmonie, Hamburg)"	2021	Roots of ReOrchestrated

== Other charted songs ==
List of other charted songs, with selected chart positions, showing year released and album name
Title	Year	Peak chart positions					Album
Title	Year	UK	BEL	IRL	SCO	US Rock	Album
"Poet"	2013	121	—	—	—	—	All This Bad Blood
"The Silence"	2013	113	—	—	—	—	All This Bad Blood
"The Draw"	2013	104	—	—	—	—	All This Bad Blood
"What Would You Do?"	2013	124	—	—	—	—	All This Bad Blood
"Skulls"	2013	169	—	—	—	—	All This Bad Blood
"Pompeii/Waiting All Night" (with Rudimental featuring Ella Eyre)	2014	21	—	42	24	—	Non-album single
"bad_news"	2014	98	—	—	60	—	Oblivion
"The Driver"	2014	169	—	—	95	—	VS. (Other People's Heartache, Pt. III)
"Fake It"	2016	83	—	—	54	28	Wild World
"Warmth"	2017	—	52	—	—	—	Wild World
"Basket Case"	2017	—	—	—	—	49	The Tick
"Bad Decisions"	2019	—	—	—	—	50	Doom Days
"Another Place"	2019	—	—	—	—	38	Doom Days
"Admit Defeat"	2019	—	77	—	—	—	Doom Days (This Got Out of Hand)
"Merry Xmas Everybody"	2020	—	— (Note: "Merry Xmas Everybody" did not enter the Flanders Ultratop 50, but charted as an "extra tip" on the Ultratip chart.)	—	—	—	Nest Christmas Number Ones
"—" denotes a recording that did not chart or was not released in that territory.

== Other certified songs ==
Title	Year	Certifications	Album
"Icarus"	2013	BPI: Silver	Bad Blood

== Guest appearances ==
Title	Year	Other artist(s)	Album
"Died in Your Arms"	2013	None	Virgin Records: 40 Years of Disruption
"We Can't Stop"	2014	None	BBC Radio 1's Live Lounge 2014
"7 Days/Final Song"	2016	None	BBC Radio 1's Live Lounge 2016
"Won't Let You Go"	2019	Frenship	Vacation

== Music videos ==
List of music videos, showing year released and director
Title	Year	Director(s)
"Overjoyed"	2012	Courtney Phillips
"Bad Blood"	2012	Olivier Groulx
"Flaws"	2012	Austin Peters
"Pompeii"	2013	Jesse John Jenkins
"Laura Palmer"	2013	Austin Peters
"Things We Lost in the Fire"	2013	Naor Aloni
"Of the Night"	2013	Dave Ma
"Oblivion"	2014	Austin Peters
"bad_news"	2014	Tom Middleton
"Torn Apart" (vs. Grades)	2014	Tim Mattia
"Good Grief"	2016	NYSU
"Fake It"	2016	Crooked Cynics
"Send Them Off!"	2016	
"Blame"	2016	Elliott Sellers
"Glory"	2017	Daniel Brereton
"World Gone Mad"	2017	David Ayer
"Help Me Chase Those Seconds"	2017	Crooked Cynics
"Quarter Past Midnight"	2018	Austin Peters
"Happier" (with Marshmello)	2018	Mercedes Bryce Morgan
"Grip" (with Seeb)	2019	Noah Duran
"Doom Days"	2019	Crooked Cynics
"Joy"	2019	
"Those Nights"	2019	Crooked Cynics
"Bad Decisions"	2019	Zac Ella & Emile Rafael
"Another Place" (featuring Alessia Cara)	2019	Anna Radchenko
"What You Gonna Do???" (featuring Graham Coxon)	2020	Rezza Dolatabadi
"Survivin'"	2020	Rezza Dolatabadi
"Distorted Light Beam"	2021	Jak Payne
"Thelma + Louise"	2021	Balázs Simon
"No Bad Days"	2021	Dan Smith & The Trash Factory
"Shut Off the Lights"	2022	Three Shades
"Remind Me"	2022	Brett Danton
"Revolution"	2022	Three Shades

== Remixes ==
Title	Year	Artist	Album
"Stop & Stare"	2011	Fenech-Soler	Non-album
"Bloody Shirt"	2012	To Kill a King	Non-album
"It's Time"	2012	Imagine Dragons	Radioactive (single)
"U Got the Power"	2013	Swiss Lips	U Got The Power (single)
"Are You Sure"	2013	David Lynch	The Big Dream
"Hard As Hello"	2014	Kimberly Anne	Hard As Hello
"I Bet My Life"	2015	Imagine Dragons	Smoke + Mirrors
"Greek Tragedy"	2015	The Wombats	Glitterbug
