= To Kill a King =

To Kill a King may refer to:

- To Kill a King (film), 2003
- To Kill a King (band), indie rock band formed in London in 2009
- To Kill a King (album), 2015 album by To Kill a King
- To Kill a King, 2017 album by Manilla Road
