= Give Me the Future =

Studio album by Bastille
- Released: 4 February 2022
- Genres: Pop rock; dance pop; electropop; power pop; synthwave
- Length: 32:15; 40:53 (deluxe); 70:47 (+ Dreams of the Past)
- Label: EMI
- Producers: Dan Smith; Dan Priddy; Mark Crew; Marty Maro; Ryan Tedder; Jonny Coffer

Bastille chronology
Doom Days (2019)	Give Me the Future (2022)	"&" (2024)

Singles from Give Me the Future
- 1. "Distorted Light Beam" Released: 23 June 2021; 2. "Give Me the Future" Released: 15 July 2021; 3. "Thelma + Louise" Released: 18 August 2021; 4. "No Bad Days" Released: 19 October 2021; 5. "Shut Off the Lights" Released: 14 January 2022

Give Me the Future + Dreams of the Past
- Cover of reissue

Singles from Give Me the Future + Dreams of the Past
- 1. "Run Into Trouble" Released: 1 April 2022; 2. "Remind Me" Released: 7 July 2022; 3. "Revolution" Released: 28 July 2022

Professional ratings
Aggregate scores
Source	Rating
AnyDecentMusic?	7.1/10
Metacritic	72/100
Review scores
Source	Rating
AllMusic	3.5/5 stars
Clash	8/10
DIY	3.5/5 stars
Gigwise	8/10 stars
NME	4/5 stars
The Independent	4/5 stars
musicOMH	4/5 stars
Pitchfork	4.7/10
The Telegraph	4/5 stars

Give Me the Future is the fourth studio album by British indie pop band Bastille, released on 4 February 2022 through EMI Records. It was executive produced by Ryan Tedder. The album was preceded by the singles "Distorted Light Beam", "Give Me the Future", and "Thelma + Louise", and subsequently announced alongside the release of the fourth single "No Bad Days". A fifth single titled "Shut Off the Lights" launched nearly three weeks prior to the album release.

A deluxe version of the album was released on 7 February 2022. It includes the single "Survivin'" from their 2020 Goosebumps EP. Bastille toured the UK and Europe starting in April 2022 in support of the album. A super deluxe version of the album, entitled Give Me the Future + Dreams of the Past, was released on 26 August 2022, split into three "paths": Give Me the Future, Dreams of the Past and Other People's Heartache, which includes fourteen new tracks and is the fifth installment into Bastille's series of mixtapes, Other People's Heartache.

== Background ==
Dan Smith had a plan for the album prior to the beginning of the COVID-19 pandemic in early 2020, but the album took on more "prescient" themes as it was primarily worked on during the subsequent lockdowns. Smith said that "what is real and what is not has become pretty difficult to discern sometimes. We're in the age of deep fake, fake news and lying world leaders". The album has been characterised as pairing "tech-heavy themes with glistening, ambitious pop music", as well as "a tribute to humanity in a tech age" that "reflects on the strangeness of living through times that can feel like science fiction".

The album also includes a spoken-word interlude narrated by British actor and rapper Riz Ahmed titled "Promises".

== Track listing ==
Give Me the Future track listing
No.	Title	Writer(s)	Producer(s)	Length
1.	"Distorted Light Beam"	Daniel Smith; Mark Crew; Ryan Tedder; Marty Maro	Smith; Crew; Tedder; Maro	2:57
2.	"Thelma + Louise"	Smith; Rami Yacoub; Crew	Smith; Crew; Dan Priddy	2:17
3.	"No Bad Days"	Smith; Philip Plested; Crew; Daniel Priddy	Smith; Crew; Priddy	3:05
4.	"Brave New World" (interlude)	Smith; Yacoub	Smith; Crew	0:27
5.	"Back to the Future"	Smith; Yacoub; Crew	Smith; Crew	2:53
6.	"Plug In..."	Smith	Smith; Crew	2:40
7.	"Promises" (with Riz Ahmed)	Rizwan Ahmed	Ahmed	1:25
8.	"Shut Off the Lights"	Smith; Plested; Jonny Coffer; Crew	Smith; Crew; Coffer	3:07
9.	"Stay Awake?"	Smith; Yacoub; Crew	Smith; Crew; Priddy	3:07
10.	"Give Me the Future"	Smith; Ralph Pelleymounter; Crew	Smith; Crew	3:39
11.	"Club 57"	Smith; Tedder; Crew	Smith; Crew	3:12
12.	"Total Dissociation" (interlude)	Smith; Pelleymounter; Crew	Smith; Crew	0:43
13.	"Future Holds" (featuring Bim)	Smith; Crew; Jack Duxbury	Smith; Crew	2:43
Total length:				32:15

Deluxe edition
No.	Title	Writer(s)	Producer(s)	Length
14.	"Back to the Innerverse" (interlude)	Smith; Beau Colburn	Smith	0:20
15.	"Real Life"	Smith; Crew; Tedder	Smith; Crew; Tedder	2:20
16.	"Survivin'"	Smith; Plested; Crew; Priddy	Smith; Crew; Priddy	2:52
17.	"Shut Off the Lights" (Spinall remix)	Smith; Crew; Plested; Coffer	Smith; Crew; Coffer	3:06
Total length:				40:53

Give Me the Future + Dreams of the Past
No.	Title	Length
1.	"Back to the Innerverse" (interlude)	0:20
2.	"Real Life"	2:20
3.	"Family Ties"	2:46
4.	"Distorted Light Beam" (reprise)	3:23
5.	"Revolution"	3:03
6.	"Survivin'"	2:53
7.	"No More Bad Days"	3:59
8.	"Hope for the Future"	3:32
9.	"Other People's Heartache" (interlude)	0:45
10.	"Run into Trouble" (featuring Alok)	3:02
11.	"Remind Me"	3:02
12.	"Eight Hours" (featuring Tyde)	3:28
13.	"Dancing in the Dark"	3:07
14.	"Running Away"	2:52
Total length:		70:47

Notes

- "Survivin'" is stylized in lowercase.

== Personnel ==
Bastille

- Dan Smith – vocals (1–3, 5–13), keyboards (1–3, 5, 6, 8–13), programming (4, 7, 12)
- Kyle Simmons – background vocals (1, 8), computer music voices (1), keyboards (2, 5, 8)
- Will Farquarson – guitar (2, 5, 8), background vocals (8), bass (8, 11)
- Chris Wood – background vocals, drums (5, 8)

Additional musicians

- Marty Maro – bass, drums, guitar, keyboards, programming (1)
- Dan Priddy – keyboards, programming (1–3, 5, 9, 10); background vocals (8)
- Mark Crew – keyboards (1–3, 5, 8–11, 13), programming (1–3, 5, 8, 9, 11, 13), guitar (11)
- Jonny Abraham – string arrangement (1, 4–6, 10, 12), trumpet (5, 8, 10)
- Llinos Richards – cello (1, 4–6, 10, 12)
- Jordan Bergmans – viola (1, 4–6, 10, 12)
- Ciara Ismail – violin (1, 4–6, 10, 12)
- Rosie Langley – violin (1, 4–6, 10, 12)
- Bim Amoake-Gyampah – background vocals (2), vocals (13)
- Charlie Barnes – guitar (2, 5, 8, 10), background vocals (8)
- Jack Duxbury – guitar (2, 3, 5, 11, 13), piano (3); keyboards, programming (13)
- John Rittipo-Moore – saxophone (5, 8, 10), background vocals (8)
- Barnaby Philpott – trombone (5, 8, 10)
- Riz Ahmed – spoken word (7)
- Adam Foster – background vocals (8)
- Chris Speirs – background vocals (8)
- Dick Meredith – background vocals (8)
- Lisa O'Callaghan – background vocals (8)
- Paul Cooper – background vocals (8)
- Jonny Coffer – guitar, programming (8)
- May Charters – spoken word (9)
- Jack Scott – whistle (11)
- Senab Adekunle – background vocals, vocal arrangement (13)

Technical

- Chris Gehringer – mastering
- Mark "Spike" Stent – mixing (1–6, 8–11, 13)
- Mark Crew – mixing (7, 12), recording (1–6, 8–13)
- Rich Rich – recording (1)
- Riz Ahmed – recording (7)
- Jonny Coffer – recording (8)
- Matt Wolach – mixing assistance (1–6, 8–11, 13)

== Charts ==
Chart performance for Give Me the Future
Chart (2022)	Peak position
Australian Albums (ARIA)	69
Austrian Albums (Ö3 Austria)	30
Belgian Albums (Ultratop Flanders)	15
Belgian Albums (Ultratop Wallonia)	53
Dutch Albums (Album Top 100)	10
German Albums (Offizielle Top 100)	15
Irish Albums (IRMA)	96
Scottish Albums (Official Charts)	1
Swiss Albums (Schweizer Hitparade)	28
UK Albums (Official Charts)	1
US Billboard 200	110
US Top Alternative Albums (Billboard)	13
US Top Rock Albums (Billboard)	17

== Certifications ==
Certifications for Give Me the Future
Region	Certification	Certified units/sales
United Kingdom (BPI)	Silver	60,000^{‡}
^{‡} Sales+streaming figures based on certification alone.
