= What You Gonna Do??? =

Single by Bastille featuring Graham Coxon

from the EP Goosebumps
- A-side: "Survivin'" (double A-side)
- Released: 30 July 2020
- Recorded: 2020
- Studio: One Eyed Jack's
- Genre: Alternative rock; garage rock
- Length: 2:11
- Label: EMI Records; Virgin Records
- Songwriter: Dan Smith
- Producers: Smith; Mark Crew

Bastille singles chronology
"Can't Fight This Feeling" (2019)	"What You Gonna Do???" (2020)	"Survivin'" (2020)

Graham Coxon singles chronology
"Falling" (2017)	"What You Gonna Do???" (2020)

"What You Gonna Do???" (stylised in all caps as "WHAT YOU GONNA DO???") is a song by the English indie pop band Bastille, released on 30 July 2020 as the lead single from their EP Goosebumps. The song was written by Dan Smith, who also produced it alongside Mark Crew. Additionally, the song features Graham Coxon, a member of the band Blur, on guitar and vocals.

== Background ==
Smith said, "This next phase feels like a new beginning. It's about completely tearing up our process, being spontaneous and starting again. We're just really excited by the new songs. I think we're making some of the best music we’ve ever made. We want to put it out now and not wait for the whole album to be done before anyone starts to hear it. This is about where we are now and hearing us in real-time." According to a press release, the song is about "the frustration with the attention economy in which our eyes and ears are fiercely fought over, yet so few use it for anything worthwhile". Smith said, "Whether we're outside or online we're perpetually hit by so many people vying for our attention, but we're just left rolling our eyes at how rarely it's for anything that decent or funny."

== Music video ==
A music video for the song was released on 30 July 2020 with a duration of two minutes and twenty three seconds. It was directed and created by London-based British-Iranian animator Reza Dolatabadi, and took seven weeks to produce.

== Track listing ==
- Digital download
1. "What You Gonna Do???" – 2:11
- 7-inch vinyl
1. "Survivin'"
2. "What You Gonna Do???"

== Personnel ==
- Dan Smith – producer, composer, lyricist, associated performer, keyboards, vocals
- Mark Crew – producer, composer, lyricist, associated performer, keyboards, programming, recording engineer, studio personnel
- Graham Coxon – associated performer, guitar, background vocalist
- Jack Duxbury – associated performer, guitar
- Charlie Barnes – associated performer, guitar, bass guitar
- Kyle Simmons – associated performer, background vocalist
- Charles Haydon Hicks – mixer, studio personnel
- Luke Burgoyne – mixer, studio personnel
- Dan Grech-Marguerat – mixer, programming, studio personnel

== Charts ==
=== Weekly charts ===
Weekly chart performance for "What You Gonna Do???"
Chart (2020)	Peak position
Belgium (Ultratip Bubbling Under Flanders)	15
Canada Rock (Billboard)	19
US Hot Rock & Alternative Songs (Billboard)	38
US Rock & Alternative Airplay (Billboard)	12

=== Year-end charts ===
Year-end chart performance for "What You Gonna Do???"
Chart (2020)	Peak position
US Alternative Songs (Billboard)	47
