= Joy (Bastille song) =

Single by Bastille

from the album Doom Days
- Released: 2 May 2019
- Recorded: 2018
- Genre: Indie pop
- Length: 3:12
- Label: Virgin
- Songwriter: Dan Smith
- Producers: Smith; Daniel Priddy; Mark Crew

Bastille singles chronology
| "Doom Days" (2019) | "Joy" (2019) | "Those Nights" (2019) |

"Joy" is a song by English indie pop band Bastille. It was released on 2 May 2019 as the third single from their third studio album, Doom Days (2019). The song was written by Dan Smith, who handled the production along with Mark Crew and Daniel Priddy. The song features backing vocals from singer Bim Amoako.

== Live performances ==
On 7 June 2019, Bastille performed the song on The Graham Norton Show.

== Music video ==
A music video to accompany the release of "Joy" was first released onto YouTube on 30 May 2019 at a total length of three minutes and twenty seconds. In a press release, Smith said, "This video looks at the things that bring us joy, when we think no one's looking. Things that are done secretly, maybe compulsively, that we wouldn't want other people to see. What seems strange and unthinkable to one person might bring pleasure to someone else. It’s fascinating that most people have a version of themselves they want to show in public – at work or online – and a version they don’t. We wanted to show it all."

== Charts ==
=== Weekly charts ===
| Chart (2019) | Peak position |
|---|---|
| Belgium (Ultratop 50 Flanders) | 24 |
| Belgium (Ultratip Bubbling Under Wallonia) | 24 |
| Canada Rock (Billboard) | 50 |
| China Airplay/FL (Billboard) | 49 |
| Czech Republic Airplay (ČNS IFPI) | 47 |
| Ireland (IRMA) | 55 |
| Netherlands (Dutch Top 40) | 28 |
| New Zealand Hot Singles (RMNZ) | 33 |
| Scottish Singles Sales (Official Charts) | 25 |
| UK Singles (Official Charts) | 46 |
| US Adult Alternative Airplay (Billboard) | 17 |
| US Alternative Airplay (Billboard) | 10 |
| US Hot Rock & Alternative Songs (Billboard) | 12 |
| US Rock & Alternative Airplay (Billboard) | 11 |

=== Year-end charts ===
| Chart (2019) | Position |
|---|---|
| Belgium (Ultratop Flanders) | 84 |
| US Alternative Songs (Billboard) | 38 |
| US Hot Rock Songs (Billboard) | 49 |
| US Rock Airplay Songs (Billboard) | 45 |

== Certifications ==
| Region | Certification | Certified units/sales |
|---|---|---|
| United Kingdom (BPI) | Silver | 200,000^{‡} |
^{‡} Sales+streaming figures based on certification alone.
