= Doom Days (song) =

Single by Bastille

from the album Doom Days
- Released: 25 April 2019
- Recorded: 2018
- Genre: Synth-pop
- Length: 2:18
- Label: Virgin
- Songwriter(s): Dan Smith
- Producer(s): Smith; Daniel Priddy; Mark Crew

Bastille singles chronology
"Grip" (2018)	"Doom Days" (2019)	"Joy" (2019)

"Doom Days" is a song by English indie pop band Bastille. It was released on 25 April 2019 as the second single from their third studio album, Doom Days (2019). The song was written by Dan Smith, who handled the production along with Mark Crew and Daniel Priddy.

== Background ==
In an email sent to fans, Smith said, "We wanted [the song] to be really direct and talk about trying to find escapism from our modern anxieties – phone addiction, porn addiction, fake news addiction, climate change denial (to name a few)… turns out there was a shit load to talk about so I wrote about 50 verses for it and then we somehow managed to cut it down to this. Hope you like it, ultimately it's about switching off for the night." In an interview with NME, Dan Smith and Kyle Simmons said, "We wanted to really cement what is that you might be trying to escape. So if the album is about a night out and it's about escapism, I think we got to the end of the process and felt like it was really important to identify quite specifically what these modern anxieties that we all face are. Some of which feel really serious and oppressive and some of which are kind of ridiculous and mundane. We had so much to say. It just felt really important coming off the back of the last album that we’d done – addressing escapism and addressing hedonism as a tool to avoid the things in the world and in the news and in your life, like your own personal daily worries. It just felt like we needed to be quite real with it. So I wanted to write this rolling script of these worries and take the piss out of it and poke fun at ourselves. I’m one of the worst people for being glued to my phone. Anyone that spends time with me will know that and everyone is constantly ripping me for it, which is completely fair enough cos it’s a bit awful. So I wanted to address that."

== Music video ==
A music video to accompany the release of "Doom Days" was first released onto YouTube on 25 April 2019 at a total length of two minutes and twenty-one seconds.

== Charts ==
Chart (2019)	Peak position
Belgium (Ultratip Bubbling Under Flanders)	23
Scotland (OCC)	94
UK Singles (OCC)	65
US Hot Rock & Alternative Songs (Billboard)	15
