= Quarter Past Midnight =

Single by Bastille

from the album Doom Days
- Released: 9 May 2018
- Recorded: 2017
- Genre: Electropop
- Length: 3:21
- Label: Virgin
- Songwriter: Dan Smith
- Producers: Smith; Mark Crew

Bastille singles chronology
"I Know You" (2017)	"Quarter Past Midnight" (2018)	"Happier" (2018)

"Quarter Past Midnight" is a song by English indie pop band Bastille. It was released on 9 May 2018 as the lead single from their third studio album, Doom Days (2019). The song was written by Dan Smith, who handled the production along with Mark Crew.

== Background ==
In an interview with NME, Smith said, "It's the first single from our new album and it's kind of like an opening scene-setter. It's about escapism, when you want the night to keep going and try to lose yourself in it for whatever reason. We wanted to capture that feeling and have it sound a bit raucous and messy and euphoric. We wanted to try something a bit different and new. We had a really good time making this record and wanted it to very much be one concise thing with a very distinct sound."

== Music video ==
A music video to accompany the release of "Quarter Past Midnight" was first released onto YouTube on 23 May 2018 at a total length of three minutes and twenty-five seconds.

== Track listing ==
Digital download
No.	Title	Length
1.	"Quarter Past Midnight"	3:21

== Charts ==
=== Weekly charts ===
Weekly chart performance
Chart (2018)	Peak position
Belgium (Ultratop 50 Flanders)	29
Belgium (Ultratip Bubbling Under Wallonia)	26
Canada Rock (Billboard)	38
Mexico Ingles Airplay (Billboard)	26
Netherlands (Dutch Top 40)	30
Netherlands (Single Top 100)	76
Scotland Singles (Official Charts)	53
UK Singles (Official Charts)	65
US Hot Rock & Alternative Songs (Billboard)	15
US Rock & Alternative Airplay (Billboard)	5

=== Year-end charts ===
Annual chart rankings
Chart (2018)	Position
Netherlands Airplay (Airplay Top 40)	74
US Hot Rock Songs (Billboard)	41
US Rock Airplay Songs (Billboard)	28

== Certifications ==
Region	Certification	Certified units/sales
United Kingdom (BPI)	Silver	200,000^{‡}
^{‡} Sales+streaming figures based on certification alone.
