= Fake It (Bastille song) =

Promotional single by Bastille

from the album Wild World
- Released: 27 July 2016
- Genre: Electropop; alternative dance; synthpop
- Length: 4:04
- Label: Virgin
- Songwriter(s): Dan Smith
- Producer(s): Dan Smith; Mark Crew

"Fake It" is a song by English indie pop band Bastille. Despite being released before their second studio album Wild World, it is not a single, as confirmed by lead singer Dan Smith on Twitter.

== Video ==
An official video was released August 19, 2016 to promote the song.

== Personnel ==
- Dan Smith – lead vocals, keyboards, piano, percussion, string arrangements, production, programming
- Kyle Simmons – keyboards, percussion, backing vocals
- Will Farquarson – bass, keyboards, acoustic guitar, electric guitar, backing vocals
- Chris "Woody" Wood – drums, percussion, backing vocals
- Charlie Barnes – Guitar, keyboard, additional drums

== Charts ==
| Chart (2016) | Peak position |
|---|---|
| Scotland (OCC) | 54 |
| UK Singles (OCC) | 83 |
| US Hot Rock & Alternative Songs (Billboard) | 28 |
