= Those Nights =

Single by Bastille

from the album Doom Days
- Released: 4 June 2019
- Recorded: 2018
- Genre: Indie pop; synth-pop
- Length: 4:30
- Label: Virgin
- Songwriter(s): Dan Smith
- Producer(s): Smith; Mark Crew

Bastille singles chronology
"Joy" (2019)	"Those Nights" (2019)	"Another Place" (2019)

"Those Nights" is a song by English indie pop band Bastille. It was released on 4 June 2019 as the fourth single from their third studio album, Doom Days (2019). The song was written by Dan Smith, who handled the production along with Mark Crew.

== Background ==
The song takes place at 05:46 in the morning. The song's lyrics explore the meaning of relationships and the desire to find a loving companion when the world seems to be falling apart.

== Music video ==
A music video to accompany the release of "Those Nights" was first released onto YouTube on 4 June 2019 at a total length of four minutes and thirty-eight seconds. The video shows Dan Smith singing the song on an old sofa surrounded by a pile of unconscious bodies.

== Track listing ==
Digital download
No.	Title	Length
1.	"Those Nights"	4:30

== Charts ==
Chart (2019)	Peak position
New Zealand Hot Singles (RMNZ)	34
US Hot Rock & Alternative Songs (Billboard)	26

== Release history ==
Region	Date	Format	Label
United Kingdom	4 June 2019	Digital download	Virgin
