= "&" =

2024 studio album by Bastille

Studio album by Bastille
- Released: 25 October 2024
- Length: 52:14
- Labels: Virgin EMI; Best Laid Plans
- Producers: Dan Smith; Mark Crew

Bastille chronology
Give Me the Future (2022)	"&" (2024)	"&" (Part Four) (2025)

Singles from "&"
- 1. "Intros & Narrators" Released: 19 July 2024; 2. "Blue Sky & the Painter" Released: 26 September 2024

"&" (Part Four)

EP by Bastille
- Released: 15 August 2025
- Length: 14:54
- Labels: Virgin EMI; Best Laid Plans
- Producers: Bastille; Mark Crew

Bastille chronology
"&" (2024)	"&" (Part Four) (2025)

Singles from "&" (Part Four)
- 1. "Bathsheba & Him" Released: 1 August 2025

Bastille Presents "&", usually shortened to "&" (sometimes with "Ampersand" in parentheses) is a studio album by British indie pop band Bastille's Dan Smith, released under the Bastille name on 25 October 2024 by Virgin EMI and Best Laid Plans Records. It appeared in four parts, with Parts One and Two released on 26 July and 13 September 2024, respectively. Part Three was released on 25 October, alongside the full album; Part Four, on 15 August 2025 as a standalone EP.

== Background and concept ==
"&" is largely a solo endeavor by the band's frontman Dan Smith. The album consists of "story songs" written about various historical figures, myths, and stories. Smith originally conceived the idea of "&" with three tracks: "Leonard & Marianne", written in 2020 after watching the film Marianne and Leonard: Words of Love, "Bonnie & Clyde", based on the differences between the titular characters' real and sensationalized lives, and "Telephone Road 1977 & 2024", rewritten based on the first song Smith wrote at age 14, which itself was based on one of his father's poems about a woman he met in San Francisco in the late '70s. After constantly touring and recording albums in tour buses and hotels, the band took a quiet year in 2024. Smith took this time to write "&" at home on his kitchen table, going back to how he wrote the band's debut album Bad Blood. He and other musicians then spent three weeks at different studios across England recording all of the album's tracks. Sonically, the tracks consist of stripped back, guitar-led instrumentals, often without percussion, with sultry and intimate vocals from Smith.

== Release and promotion ==
The album was announced on 22 July 2024 alongside an album trailer. Part One was released on 26 July containing four tracks: "Intros & Narrators", "Eve & Paradise Lost", "Emily & Her Penthouse In The Sky", and "Seasons & Narcissus", the former of which was released as the lead single alongside a music video on 19 July. Part Two released on 13 September containing the two tracks "Blue Sky & the Painter" and "Leonard & Marianne", with the former released as the second single, with a music video released on 26 September. Part Three consists of the remaining songs on "&", released on 25 October along with the full album. Apart from the two singles, music videos were also released for the songs "Seasons & Narcissus", "Eve & Paradise Lost", and "Leonard & Marianne".

In promotion of the album, Bastille performed a limited run of one-off shows in Europe and the US throughout November 2024.

Part Four of "&" was released on 15 August 2025 as a standalone EP, with the single "Bathsheba & Him" released on 1 August. The EP also contains the tracks "Bonnie & Clyde", "My Head & the Glass", and "Bored & Overboard (Pandora's Box)", as well as live versions of some of the band's tracks recorded at the Turner Contemporary Gallery as part of Arte Concert's Sounds Like Art series.

=== Podcast ===
Dan Smith also co-hosted the podcast "Muses: An Ampersand Podcast" with academic and podcaster Emma Nagouse, which ran for twelve episodes from October to December 2024. It explored the background of songs from "&" as well as the history surrounding each track. Each episode also included a portion where Nagouse would give Smith "homework" to write a new song about a different historical figure or topic. The podcast concluded with a live show at Bush Hall on 3 December 2024, with singer-songwriter Bim as a special guest, who is also featured on the album.

== Critical reception ==
In a positive review, Sarah Jamieson of DIY called the album "an innovative, immersive and wholly enjoyable project". While Jui Zaveri of The Indiependent called the project "an ambitious experiment of sound and storytelling" and "A haunting indie-folk album: quiet and pared-back instrumentals that sometimes swell up to orchestral heights; beautifully poetic lyrics and an atmosphere of melancholy". A positive review from XS Noize, written by Michael Barron, also noted that the album "blends modern music with rich narratives, creating a fascinating interplay between the past and present".

== Track listing ==
All tracks are written by Dan Smith. Additional writers are included below.

No.	Title	Writer(s)	Producer(s)	Length
1.	"Intros & Narrators"		Mark Crew; Smith	3:53
2.	"Eve & Paradise Lost"		Crew; Smith	3:10
3.	"Emily & Her Penthouse in the Sky"	Crew; Dan Priddy	Crew; Smith	3:20
4.	"Blue Sky & the Painter"		Crew; Smith	3:52
5.	"Leonard & Marianne"	Dan Wilson	Crew; Smith; Dan Priddy	3:56
6.	"Marie & Polonium"	Ralph Pelleymounter	Crew; Smith; Charlie Barnes	3:22
7.	"Red Wine & Wilde"		Crew; Smith	3:41
8.	"Seasons & Narcissus"		Crew; Smith	3:32
9.	"Drawbridge & The Baroness"		Crew; Smith	3:41
10.	"The Soprano & Midnight Wonderings" (featuring Bim)	Abimbola Amoako-Gyampah	Crew; Smith	4:30
11.	"Essie & Paul"		Crew; Smith; JF Abraham	3:37
12.	"Mademoiselle & The Nunnery Blaze"		Crew; Smith	3:59
13.	"Zheng Yi Sao & Questions For Her"		Crew; Smith	3:34
14.	"Telegraph Road 1977 & 2024"		Smith; Barnes	4:07
Total length:				52:14

"&" (Part Four)
No.	Title	Writer(s)	Producer(s)	Length
1.	"Bonnie & Clyde"		Crew; Smith	4:10
2.	"Bathsheba & Him"	Emma Nagouse	Crew; Smith	3:33
3.	"My Head & the Glass"	Rob Milton	Crew; Smith	3:44
4.	"Bored & Overboard (Pandora's Box)"		Crew; Smith	3:27
Total length:				14:54

== Personnel ==
Credits adapted from Apple Music.

=== Musicians ===
- Abimbola Amoako-Gyampah – backing vocals (tracks 1, 4, 10), lead vocals (track 10)
- Charlie Barnes – guitar (tracks 1–2, 4, 6, 8–10, 13), piano (tracks 1, 5–6, 8, 14), bass guitar (tracks 1, 6, 10, 13–14), string arrangement (track 6), wurlitzer piano (track 9), keyboards, lap steel guitar (track 12)
- Ciara Ismail – violin (tracks 4–7, 11, 13)
- Dan Grech-Marguerat – programming (tracks 4, 10–11, 13)
- Dan Smith – lead vocals, (1–9, 11–14), backing vocals (tracks 1–14), mellotron (track 3), piano (track 10)
- Grant McNeill – backing vocals (tracks 3–4)
- Isla Smith – backing vocals (track 14)
- Jack Duxbury – guitar, piano (track 7)
- James Earp – guitar (tracks 1, 3, 7–8, 12–13), bass guitar (tracks 3, 7–8)
- JF Abraham – bass guitar (tracks 2, 4–5, 9, 11–12), string arrangement (track 5–7, 11, 13), trumpet (track 9), synthesizer, synthesizer programming (track 13)
- Josh Taffel – backing vocals (tracks 3–4)
- Matt Ingram – drums (tracks 4, 6, 8–10, 12–13)
- Moira Mack – backing vocals (tracks 1–2, 4–8, 11–13)
- Natalia Senior-Brown – viola (tracks 4–7, 11, 13)
- Rachel Lander – cello (tracks 4–7, 11, 13)
- Ralph Pelleymounter – backing vocals (tracks 3–4)
- Ric Elsworth – vibraphone, marimba (track 6), glockenspiel (track 9)
- Stephanie Benedetti – violin (tracks 4–7, 11, 13)

=== Technical ===
- Abraham – production (track 11)
- Amy Sergeant – recording engineering (tracks 1–14)
- Barnes – production (tracks 6, 14)
- Cassius Whiley-Morton – assistant recording engineering (tracks 1–14), assistant engineering (tracks 4–7, 9–14)
- Dylan Grafftey-Smith – assistant recording engineering (tracks 1–14), assistant engineering (tracks 4–7, 9–14)
- Emily Lazar – mastering (tracks 1–14)
- Gili Portal – assistant mixing (tracks 2, 7, 12)
- Grech-Marguerat – mixing (tracks 4, 10–11, 13)
- Jan "Stan" Kybert – immersive mastering and mixing (tracks 4–7, 9–14)
- Lee Smith – mixing (tracks 5–6, 9)
- Luke Burgoyne – assistant mixing (tracks 4, 10–11, 13)
- Luke Gibbs – assistant recording engineering (tracks 1–14), assistant engineering (tracks 4–7, 9–14)
- Manon Grandjean – mixing (tracks 2, 7, 12)
- Mark Crew – production (tracks 1–13), recording engineering (tracks 1–14), mixing (tracks 1–3, 8, 14)
- Michael Osborne – assistant mixing (tracks 5–6, 9)
- Seb Maletka-Catala – assistant mixing (tracks 4, 10–11, 13)
- Smith – production (tracks 1–14)

=== "&" (Part Four) ===
==== Musicians ====
- Abraham – bass guitar (tracks 3–4), backing vocals (track 4)
- Amoako-Gyampah – baritone (track 3)
- Barnes – guitar (tracks 1–4), piano (tracks 2–3), bass guitar (track 2), backing vocals (track 4)
- Crew – programming (track 2)
- Earp – guitar (tracks 1, 3), bass guitar (track 1)
- Ingram – drums (tracks 1, 3–4)
- Mack – backing vocals (tracks 1–3)
- McNeill – backing vocals (track 4)
- Pelleymounter – backing vocals (track 4)
- Smith – lead vocals (tracks 1–4), backing vocals (1–4), organ (track 1), programming (track 3), mellotron (track 4)
- Taffel – backing vocals (track 4)

==== Technical ====
- Burgoyne – assistant mixing (track 1)
- Crew – production, recording engineering (tracks 1–4), mixing (track 2)
- Gibbs – assistant recording engineering (tracks 1, 3–4)
- Grafftey-Smith – assistant recording engineering (tracks 1, 3–4)
- Grandjean – mixing (tracks 3–4)
- Grech-Marguerat – mixing (track 1)
- Kybert – immersive mixing (tracks 1–4), immersive mastering (track 1)
- Lazar – mastering (tracks 1, 3–4)
- Maletka-Catala – assistant mixing (track 1)
- Matt Colton – mastering (track 2)
- Portal – assistant mixing (tracks 3–4)
- Sergeant – recording engineering (tracks 1, 3–4)
- Smith – production (tracks 1–4)
- Whiley-Morton – assistant recording engineering (tracks 1, 3–4)
