= Another Place (song) =

Single by Bastille and Alessia Cara

from the album Doom Days
- Released: 25 October 2019
- Recorded: 2018
- Length: 3:31
- Label: Virgin
- Songwriter(s): Dan Smith
- Producer(s): Mark Crew; Smith; Dan Priddy

Bastille singles chronology
"Those Nights" (2019)	"Another Place" (2019)	"Can't Fight This Feeling" (2019)

Alessia Cara singles chronology
"Rooting for You" (2019)	"Another Place" (2019)	"Make it to Christmas" (2019)

"Another Place" is a song by English indie pop band Bastille and Canadian singer and songwriter Alessia Cara. It was released on 25 October 2019 as the fifth single from Bastille's third studio album, Doom Days (2019).

== Background ==
Bastille released the new version of the song with Alessia Cara after she joined the band on stage in her hometown of Toronto during the band's recent US tour. When talking about the collaboration, Dan Smith said, "I'd always heard 'Another Place' as a duet and wanted it to be a story told from two perspectives, it's not something we've ever done, outside of our mixtapes, but we are huge fans of Alessia's — her voice and her song-writing are so distinct and brilliant — and we sent it to her to see if she'd be up for jumping on it with us. We love her verse and everything that she's brought to the song – I think she really elevates it." Cara said, "I met Dan last year and we got on really well, we talked about doing something together and he sent me the song a little while later. I loved the concept and thought it was both sonically and lyrically really great, as all Bastille stuff is. It all came together pretty naturally, and I can't wait for people to hear it."

== Music video ==
A music video to accompany the release of "Another Place" was first released onto YouTube on 1 November 2019.

== Track listing ==
Digital download (Album version)
No.	Title	Length
1.	"Another Place"	3:31

Digital download (Single)
No.	Title	Length
1.	"Another Place" (with Alessia Cara)	3:33

== Charts ==
Weekly chart performance for "Another Place"
Chart (2019–2020)	Peak position
Netherlands (Dutch Tipparade 40)	9
New Zealand Hot Singles (RMNZ)	23
Slovakia (Rádio Top 100)	45
Sweden Heatseeker (Sverigetopplistan)	16
US Hot Rock & Alternative Songs (Billboard)	18

== Certifications ==
Certifications for "Another Place"
Region	Certification	Certified units/sales
Brazil (Pro-Música Brasil)	Gold	20,000^{‡}
^{‡} Sales+streaming figures based on certification alone.

== Release history ==
Release history for "Another Place"
Region	Date	Format	Label
United Kingdom	25 October 2019	Digital download; streaming	Virgin
