= Grip (song) =

Single by Seeb and Bastille

from the album Other People's Heartache, Pt. 4 and Sad in Scandinavia
- Released: 6 December 2018
- Recorded: 2018
- Genre: Indie rock, future bass
- Length: 3:18
- Label: Virgin
- Songwriter(s): Espen Berg; Dan Smith; Thomas Eriksen; Mark Crew; Simen Eriksrud; Joakim Haukaas
- Producer(s): Mark Crew; Kid Joki; SeeB; Earwulf

Seeb singles chronology
"Drink About" (2018)	"Grip" (2018)	"Free to Go" (2019)

Bastille singles chronology
"Happier" (2018)	"Grip" (2018)	"Doom Days" (2019)

"Grip" is a song by Norwegian EDM record production duo Seeb and English indie pop band Bastille. It was released on 6 December 2018 as the lead single from the latter's fourth mixtape, Other People's Heartache, Pt. 4 (2018). The song was written by Espen Berg, Dan Smith, Thomas Eriksen, Mark Crew, Simen Eriksrud and Joakim Haukaas.

== Background ==
In an interview with NME, Smith said, "It was an interesting opportunity to work with an artist that we probably wouldn't and that's what makes the mixtapes what they are. My vocal, as it's completely fucked with, flies astronomically up into the air and I think I initially laughed [when I first heard it]. This is way outside of my comfort zone and that’s definitely a good thing."

== Music video ==
A music video to accompany the release of "Grip" was first released onto YouTube on 24 January 2019 at a total length of three minutes and forty-five seconds.

== Charts ==
=== Weekly charts ===
Chart (2019)	Peak position
Belgium (Ultratop 50 Flanders)	32
Belgium (Ultratip Bubbling Under Wallonia)	24
Ireland (IRMA)	95
Netherlands (Dutch Top 40)	17
Netherlands (Single Top 100)	69
New Zealand Hot Singles (RMNZ)	16
Norway (VG-lista)	25
Sweden Heatseeker (Sverigetopplistan)	3
US Alternative Airplay (Billboard)	38
US Dance/Mix Show Airplay (Billboard)	38

=== Year-end charts ===
Chart (2019)	Position
Netherlands (Dutch Top 40)	96
