= Survivin' =

Single by Bastille

from the EP Goosebumps
- A-side: "What You Gonna Do???" (double A-side)
- Released: 22 September 2020
- Length: 2:53
- Label: EMI Records; Virgin Records
- Songwriters: Dan Priddy; Dan Smith; Mark Crew; Phil Plested
- Producers: Dan Priddy; Dan Smith; Mark Crew

Bastille singles chronology
| "What You Gonna Do???" (2020) | "Survivin'" (2020) | "Distorted Light Beam" (2021) |

"Survivin'" (stylised in all lowercase) is a song by English indie pop band Bastille. It was released on 22 September 2020 as the second single from their EP, Goosebumps. The song was written by Dan Priddy, Dan Smith, Mark Crew and Phil Plested.

== Background ==
Talking about the song, Smith said, "There'd been times when I felt like I'd been in a washing machine and on a conveyor belt at the same time, but when people asked me how I was doing, the answer was always the British cliché: 'Yep, all good, fine'. At the start of lockdown I felt very self-conscious about having written a song that felt relevant when it wasn't intended to be, but then I also think 2020 is the year we all stopped pretending everything's fine."

== Music video ==
A music video for the song was released on 6 October 2020 at a total length of three minutes and two seconds. The video was directed by Reza Dolatabadi. Talking about the video, Dolatabadi said, "Overall I wanted to give the video a grand feel, almost like it belongs on the big screen, and for that we had to build a city in 3D, lock all the camera angles and movements and then animate our characters over the 3D layouts. Animation is a teamwork. I have to say I've been so lucky to work with an incredible team of artists from all over the world on this project. Without their dedication and attention to details there was no way I could have finished this ambitious piece."

== Track listing ==
- Digital download
1. "Survivin'" – 2:23
- 7-inch vinyl
1. "Survivin'"
2. "What You Gonna Do???"

== Personnel ==
Credits adapted from Tidal.

- Dan Priddy – producer, composer, lyricist, additional producer, associated performer, keyboards, programming
- Dan Smith – producer, composer, lyricist, associated performer, keyboards, vocals
- Mark Crew – producer, composer, lyricist, associated performer, keyboards, programming, recording engineer, studio personnel
- Phil Plested – composer, lyricist, associated performer, background vocalist
- Charlie Barnes – associated performer, guitar
- Jonji – associated performer, flute, saxophone
- Jonny Abraham – associated performer, guitar
- Kyle Simmons – associated performer, background vocalist
- Palph Pellymounter – associated performer, background vocalist
- Tinashé Fazakerley – associated performer, background vocalist
- Chris Gehringer – mastering engineer, studio personnel
- Mark 'Spike' Stent – mixer, studio personnel

== Charts ==
Chart performance for "Survivin'"
| Chart (2020–21) | Peak position |
|---|---|
| Belgium (Ultratip Bubbling Under Flanders) | 4 |
| Belgium (Ultratip Bubbling Under Wallonia) | 33 |
| Iceland (Tónlistinn) | 29 |
| UK Sales Chart (OCC) | 76 |
| US Adult Pop Airplay (Billboard) | 18 |
| US Hot Rock & Alternative Songs (Billboard) | 34 |
| US Rock & Alternative Airplay (Billboard) | 31 |

=== Year-end charts ===
Year-end chart performance for "Survivin'"
| Chart (2021) | Peak position |
|---|---|
| US Adult Alternative Songs (Billboard) | 44 |
