= To Kill a King (album) =

Studio album by To Kill a King
- Released: 2 March 2015
- Genre: Rock
- Length: 38:37
- Label: Xtra Mile

To Kill a King chronology
Cannibals With Cutlery (2013)	To Kill a King (2015)	The Spiritual Dark Age (2018)

To Kill a King is the second studio album by the English band To Kill a King. It was released on 2 March 2015 by Xtra Mile Recordings.

== Reception ==
Professional ratings
Aggregate scores
Source	Rating
Metacritic	68/100
Review scores
Source	Rating
Drowned in Sound	5/10
The Guardian	3/5 stars
The Line of Best Fit	5/10
Q	4/5 stars

Review aggregator Metacritic listed 4 reviews for the album with a weighted average score of 68 out of 100.

== Track listing ==
To Kill a King track listing
No.	Title	Length
1.	"Compare Scars"	3:39
2.	"Love Is Not Control"	3:11
3.	"Oh My Love"	4:34
4.	"Friends"	3:49
5.	"The Chancer"	4:34
6.	"School Yard Rumours"	3:15
7.	"Good Times (A Rake's Progress)"	2:09
8.	"Musicians Like Gamblers Like Drunks Like Me"	3:28
9.	"Grace at a Party"	3:56
10.	"World of Joy (A List of Things to Do)"	4:20
11.	"Today"	1:41
Total length:		38:37
