= Bastille (band) =

British indie pop band

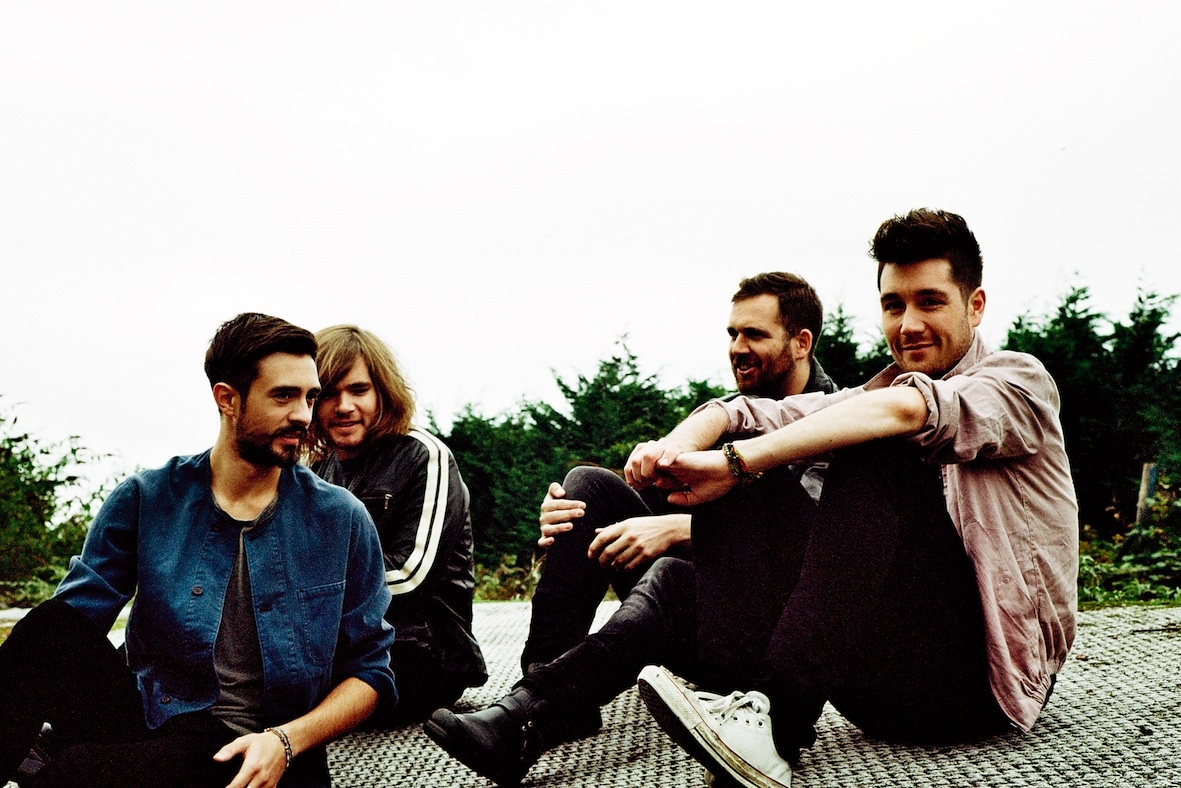
- Bastille in 2013: Kyle Simmons, Chris Wood, Will Farquarson, and Dan Smith (left to right)

Background information
- Origin: London, England
- Genres: Indie pop; pop rock; synth-pop; electropop; alternative rock
- Years active: 2010–present
- Labels: Virgin; EMI; Best Laid Plans
- Members: Dan Smith; Kyle Simmons; Will Farquarson; Chris "Woody" Wood
- Website: bastillebastille.com

Bastille (stylized as BΔSTILLE) are an English indie pop band formed in 2010. The group began as a solo project by lead vocalist Dan Smith, but later expanded to include keyboardist Kyle Simmons, bassist and guitarist Will Farquarson and drummer Chris "Woody" Wood.

After an independently released debut single and a self-released EP, the band signed to Virgin Records. Their first studio album, Bad Blood, was released in March 2013 and entered the UK Albums Chart at number one and included the hit single "Pompeii" which peaked at number two on the UK Singles Chart. Bastille released the album in the US later that year. Their second studio album, Wild World, was released in September 2016, and was followed by Doom Days, Bastille's third studio album, in June 2019. In February 2022, Bastille released their fourth studio album, Give Me the Future. A Dan Smith solo project, "&", was released under the Bastille name in October 2024.

Bastille's music has been featured in television shows, films, video games, and advertisements. Bastille was nominated for four Brit Awards at the 2014 ceremony, winning the British Breakthrough Act. As of August 2021, the band have sold over eleven million records worldwide.

== History ==
=== Formation and early releases (2010–2011) ===
Bastille logo

Bastille debuted in July 2010 with their limited edition 7" single that featured the two tracks "Flaws" and "Icarus". Released through London-based independent record label Young & Lost Club, only 300 copies were pressed. One of the copies found its way into the hands of Alex Baker, presenter of the unsigned/independent artists radio show on Kerrang! Radio. Baker started to support Bastille on air, and the band began to find an audience. They released the EP Laura Palmer themselves later in 2011. After releasing further tracks online through sites such as YouTube and MySpace, the band's audience started to grow. In December 2011, Smith signed a contract with Virgin Records. The group subsequently secured a few support slots and later performed at major UK festivals including Glastonbury, the Isle of Wight, Redfest, Reading and Leeds Festival and Blissfields. The band also recorded and released two parts of their mix-tape titled Other People's Heartache for free.

=== Bad Blood and All This Bad Blood (2012–2014) ===
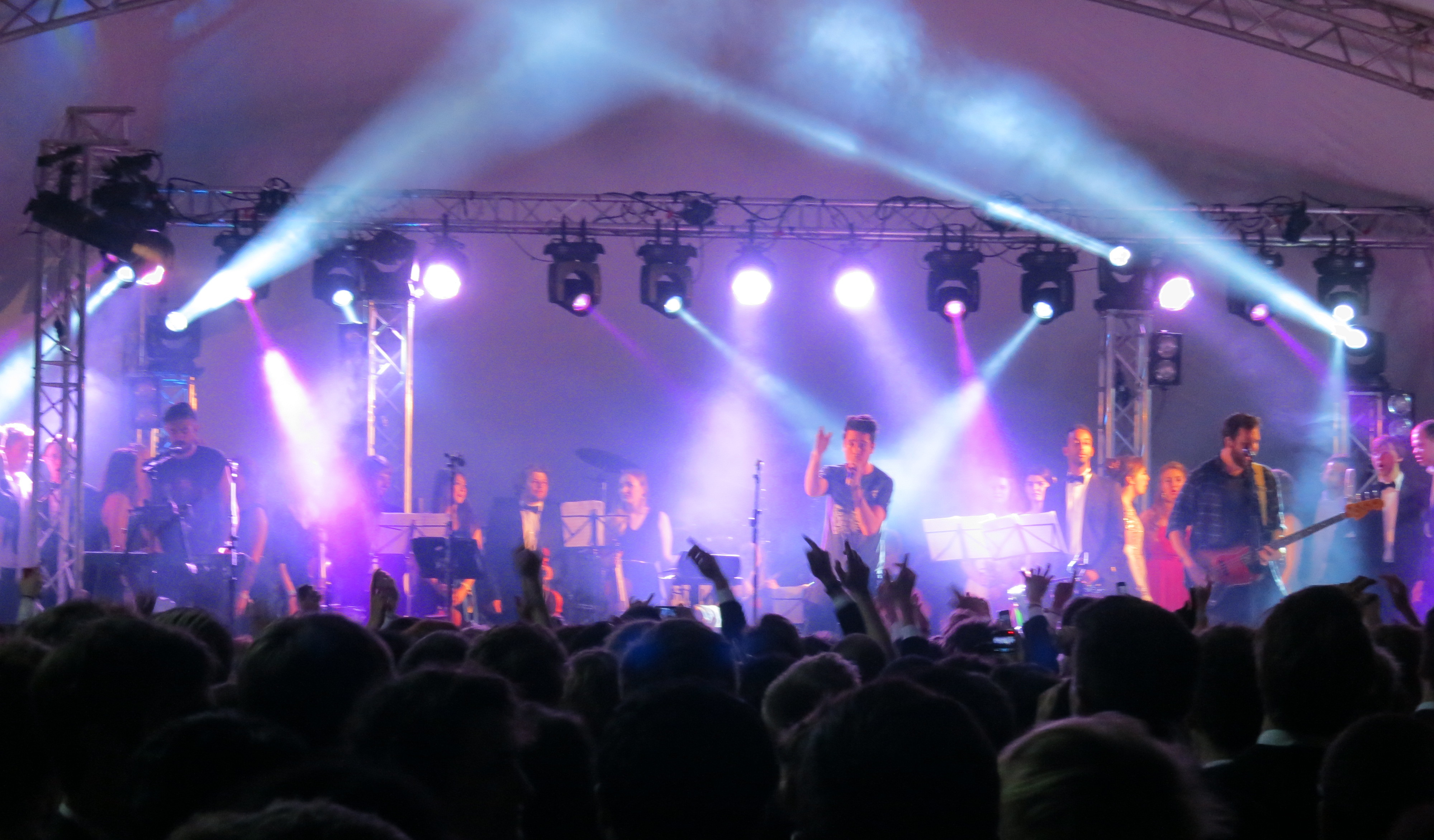
Bastille in concert at Queens' College May Ball, 2013

On 27 April 2012, their first official single release, "Overjoyed", was released through Virgin Records, as confirmed by EMI on 1 May 2012. Following its video premiere in November 2011, popular music publication, Q Magazine introduced the track as its 'Track of the Day' for 7 March 2012. The second single to be released from the upcoming debut studio album, Bad Blood, was the title track, "Bad Blood". An accompanying video for the single was released on the band's official VEVO channel on 29 June 2012, and digitally through Virgin Records on 20 August 2012. Bastille was also named 'New Band of the Day' by The Guardian in July 2012. The song charted moderately at number 90 in the United Kingdom and saw the group's first entry into the chart. In August 2012, the band performed at UK festivals like Reading and Leeds, as well as supporting British singer-songwriter Emeli Sandé. They later played a small headlining tour, titled 'Flaws Tour' in October 2012, with Swiss Lips as their support act. In November 2012, the band performed at Hong Kong's Clockenflap Music and Arts Festival, their first outside of Europe. Their third single, a re-release of their first 7" non-album single "Flaws", was a commercial success, earning the group their first position in the UK Top 40, debuting at number-twenty-one.

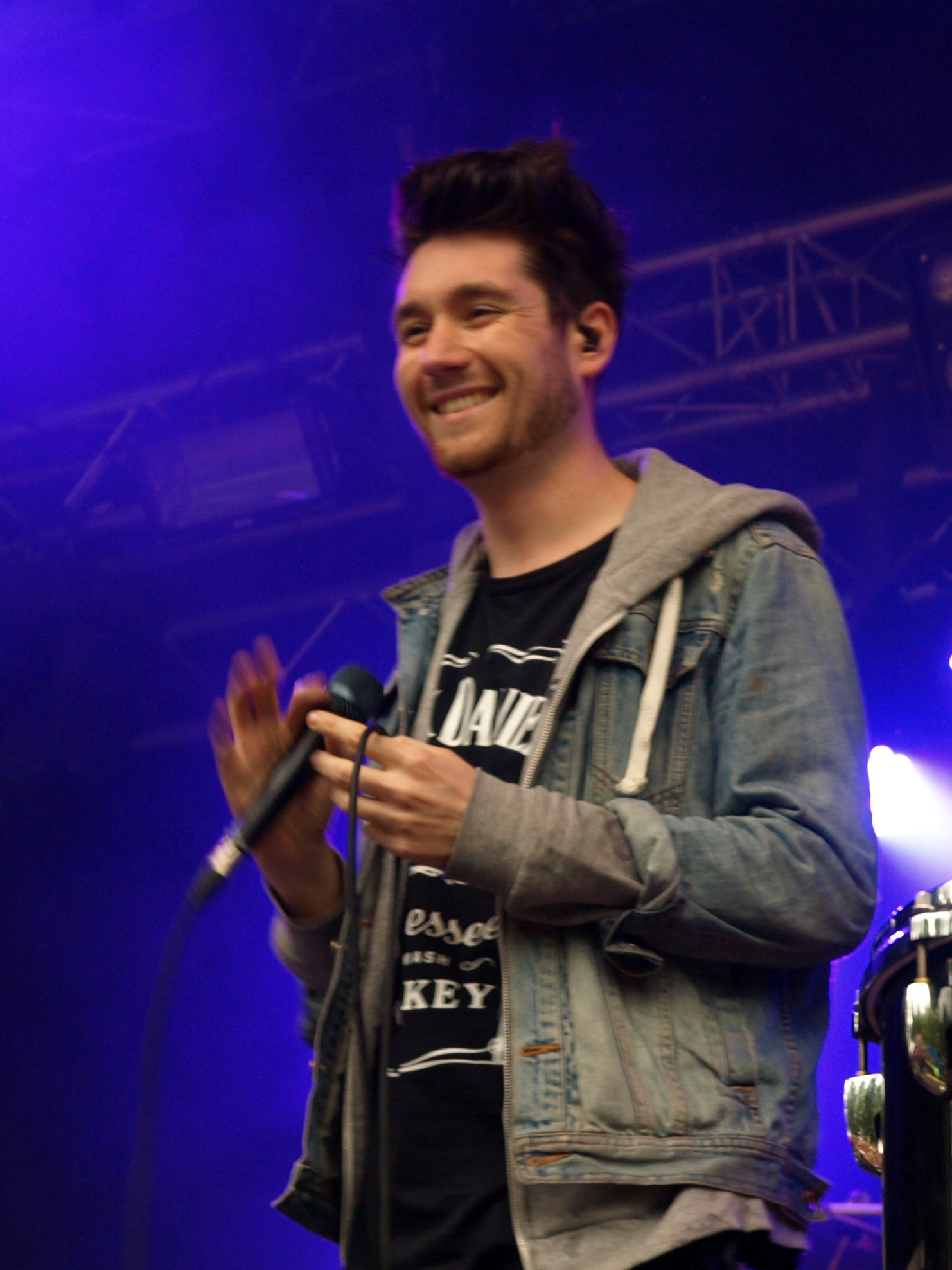
Founder and frontman Dan Smith at Provinssirock festival 2013 in Seinäjoki, Finland

In February 2013, Bastille confirmed the release of the fourth single to be taken from Bad Blood, "Pompeii". The song was positively reviewed by critics, reaching number two in the United Kingdom and number five in the US. Their debut album Bad Blood was released on 4 March 2013, and placed at number one in the UK Albums Chart. On 11 March, Bastille was announced to be playing at the Reading and Leeds Festival in August 2013."Laura Palmer" was released on 3 June 2013, and an accompanying video for the track premiered through the band's official VEVO page on 12 April 2013. The group joined English rock band Muse as a supporting act on their The 2nd Law Tour in May 2013 and did so again in June 2013. In May 2013, Bastille released their Haunt EP in the US via iTunes. On Saturday 6 July, the band headlined their first UK summer music festival at Blissfields. Smith said, "We're massively excited about our first ever headline slot at a festival. Particularly because we love Blissfields so much, and because they've been so supportive to us over the last couple of years." The performance coincided with the band appearing on the cover of a national music publication, Notion magazine, for the first time. On 24 August 2013, "Things We Lost in the Fire" was released as the sixth single from the band's debut album. A music video for the song was shot in Vilnius and Kėdainiai, Lithuania. On 3 September 2013, Bastille released their Bad Blood album in the US via iTunes.

On 9 October 2013, Bastille released a new single, "Of the Night", a mash-up of the songs "The Rhythm of the Night" by Corona and "Rhythm Is a Dancer" by Snap!. The single debuted at number two on UK Singles Chart. The song was promoting All This Bad Blood, a reissue of the band's debut album, released on 25 November 2013. In January 2014, Will Farquarson said in an interview with Billboard magazine that the band had already started to work on its second album in between tour dates. The band performed on Saturday Night Live on 25 January 2014. On 4 February 2014 Bastille won the BRIT Award for Best Breakthrough Act and performed a remixed version of "Pompeii" with Rudimental and their song "Waiting All Night" at the ceremony. Two hours after their appearance, sales of Bad Blood were up by 132% to give them a second week at number one in the UK album chart and "Pompeii" had climbed 29 places in the singles. On 1 April 2014, the Official Charts Company announced that Bad Blood was the biggest selling digital album of 2013, and Number 11 in the over-all Official Artist Albums Top 40 of 2013. Also in April 2014, the band performed at the Coachella Valley Music and Arts Festival at the Empire Polo Club in Indio, California. On 31 May 2014, the band took part in the Annual KROQ Weenie Roast in Irvine, California, performing among other bands including The Neighbourhood and Fall Out Boy. On 13 July 2014, Bastille played at T in the Park. In September 2014, they released the last single from Bad Blood, "Oblivion". The Bad Blood Tour finished in 2014.

=== VS. and Wild World (2014–2017) ===
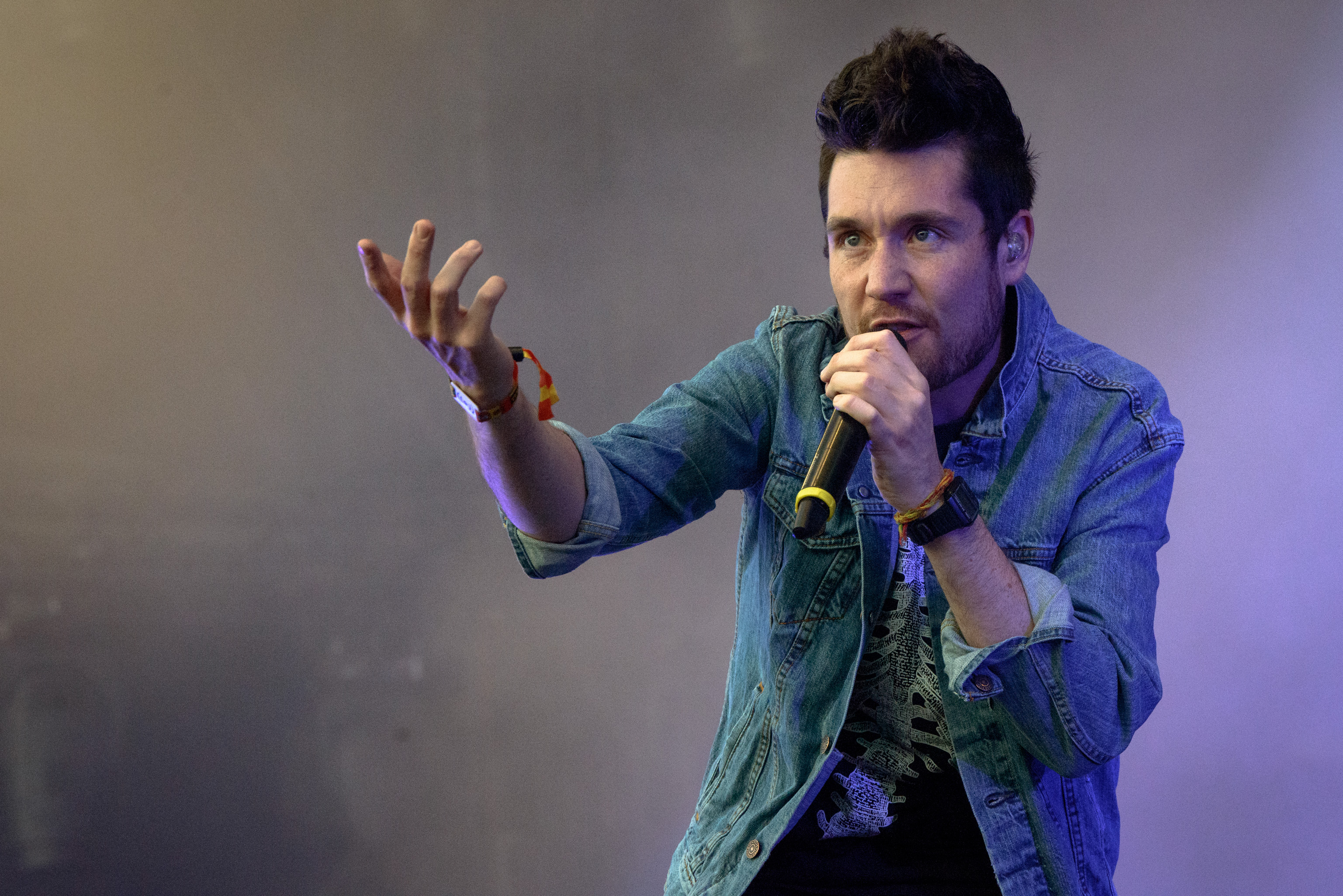
Dan Smith (2015)

In late 2013, Bastille began to play new songs called "Blame" and "Campus". Another song called "Oil On Water" was played during sound-check and leaked online. They began proper work on the album in 2014, and planned to start recording it in September. Farquarson said that they had "16 or 17 tracks" demoed already for the album. He also said, "We're going into the studio in September to record; hopefully by then we'll have 20 or maybe more. I think it's always better to have more material and whittle it down. Our producer has gone on tour with us, so we've been doing things on our days off and during sound-checks." Dan Smith said the album will include more guitars, saying "we didn't have much of that on the first album and it may not end up on it but it would be quite interesting to try it out. We feel quite free. If we want to go quite electronic then we can and if we want to go rockier and indie then we can." On 21 October 2014, Bastille announced their third mixtape, VS. (Other People's Heartache, Pt.III) with the release of their song "Torn Apart", featuring the artists Grades and Lizzo, on Zane Lowe's BBC Radio 1 show. They also wrote and recorded the song "The Driver" for the re-score of the film Drive which was released a week later and also featured on the mixtape. VS. (Other People's Heartache, Pt.III) was released on 8 December 2014 and featured the Gemma Sharples Quartet, Haim, MNEK, Tyde, Rationale, Lizzo, Grades, Angel Haze, F*U*G*Z, Braque, Rag'n'Bone Man, and Skunk Anansie. In November 2014, Bastille was featured on the Band Aid 30 version of "Do They Know It's Christmas?". They were nominated for Best New Artist at the 57th Annual Grammy Awards, but lost out to Sam Smith.

In 2015, Bastille recruited a new touring member, Charlie Barnes. On 22 September 2015, Bastille released a non-album single called "Hangin'". It was announced via Facebook that their second album would be released in 2016. Also, during that summer, the band debuted two new songs live: "Grip" and "Snakes". In April 2016, the band debuted a new song entitled "The Currents" during their performance at that year's Snowbombing festival in Mayrhofen, Austria.

On 2 June 2016, the band uploaded a trailer including an excerpt from the then-unreleased song Two Evils announcing the name of the album to be Wild World. On 9 June, it was announced that the band's new single, "Good Grief", would be released on 16 June 2016. On 16 June 2016, Annie Mac debuted "Good Grief" on her BBC Radio 1 show as the "hottest record in the world". The track was immediately released to radio, streaming services, and for purchase following the debut. In an interview with Mac following the song's premiere, Dan Smith revealed that their second album would "go through a variety of sounds, but it is very much us [Bastille]." On 24 June 2016, Bastille performed the songs "Good Grief" and "Two Evils" live for the first time at Glastonbury Festival as part of their set on the Other Stage. On 30 June 2016, Bastille announced the release of the second LP Wild World and embarked on their Wild Wild World Tour in July. Released on 9 September, the album reached the top of the mid-week sales chart, while the band set up pop-up shops in London, New York and Los Angeles to promote the release. On 16 September, it was confirmed that Wild World had reached #1 on both the U.K. and Scottish album charts. The album won "Best Album" at the 2017 NME Awards. On World Record Store Day 2017, the band released an original song titled "Comfort of Strangers".

The band was part of the 'Artists for Grenfell' charity single. Including other artists such as Stormzy and Rita Ora, the cover of the Simon & Garfunkel song "Bridge Over Troubled Water" was released on 21 June 2017 to raise money for the victims of the Grenfell Tower fire.

=== Doom Days and Other People's Heartache, Pt. IV (2018–2019) ===
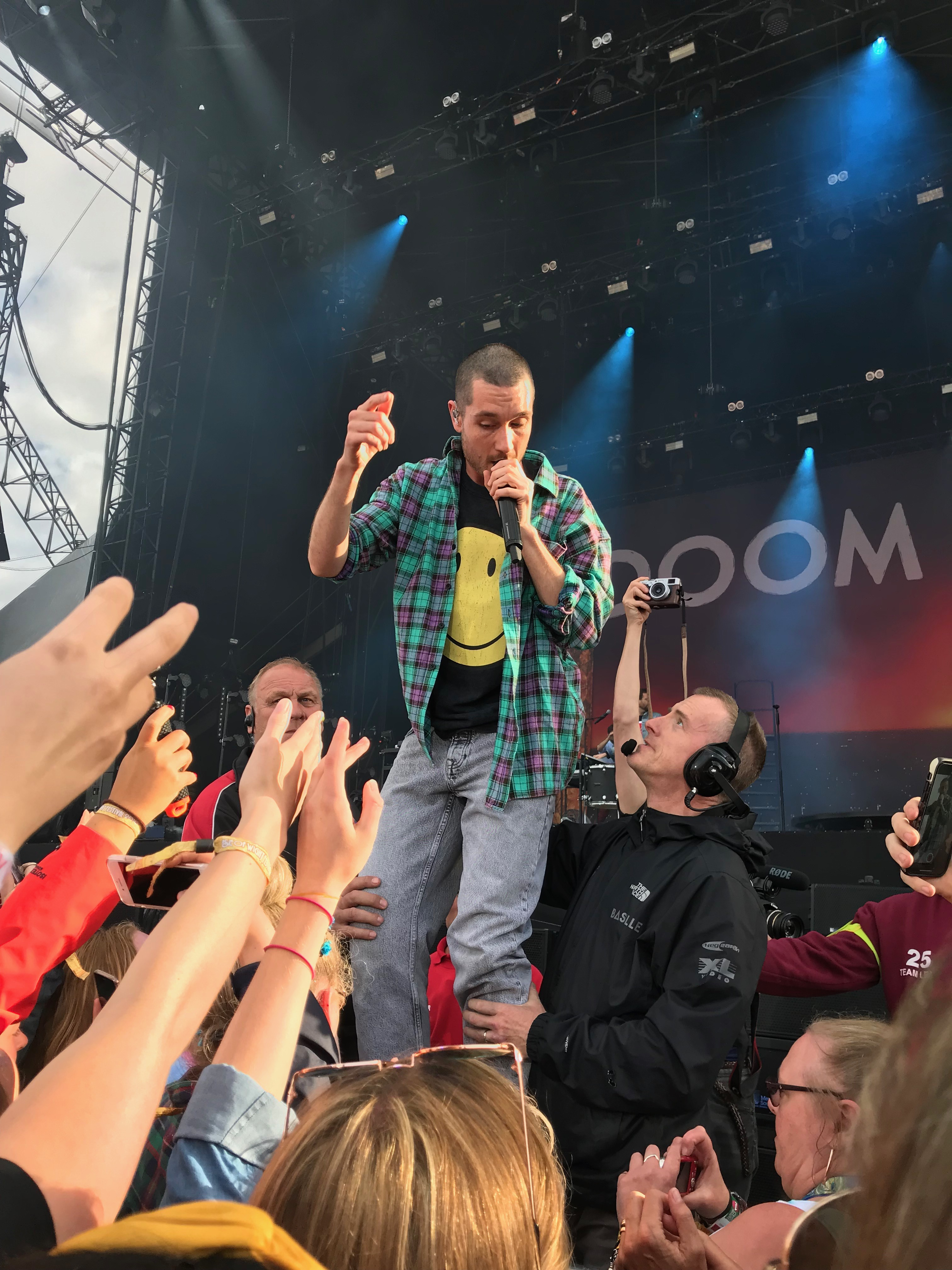
Smith performing at the 2019 Isle of Wight Festival

The band announced their third studio album, which was released on 14 June 2019. Speaking to NME, Smith said "We never really stop writing and recording, but I can confirm we spent a lot of this year writing our third album." On 1 September 2017, the band headlined the annual Pilton Party Held at Pilton Worthy Farm, home of Glastonbury Festival. On 23 November 2017, Craig David and Bastille released "I Know You", the second single from David's album, The Time Is Now. The single peaked at number 5 in 2018. On 9 May 2018, "Quarter Past Midnight", the first single from the group's third album Doom Days was aired on BBC Radio 1. On 17 August 2018, Bastille and Marshmello collaborated on the single "Happier", which reached a high of 2 on the UK Official Charts in October 2018 and the Billboard Hot 100 in February 2019. In early December 2018, the band announced a release date of 6 December 2018 for their single "Grip" which features EDM duo Seeb. Also released was "Other People's Heartache, Pt 4" on 7 December 2018 which featured the likes of notable artists such as Craig David, Jacob Banks, James Arthur, Kianja, Lily Moore, Moss Kena, Rationale, Swarmz, and S-X. A limited edition Record Store Day 2019 version of the mixtape was released in independent record shops on 13 April 2019.

On 25 April 2019, Bastille released the second single and title track from their third album Doom Days. On 2 May 2019, the third single from the album, "Joy", was premiered on Scott Mills' show on BBC Radio 1. A fourth single, "Those Nights", was released on 4 June 2019 and was premiered on Beats 1 with Zane Lowe. On 17 May 2019, Bastille was featured on American pop duo FRENSHIP's song titled "Won't Let You Go" on their debut album Vacation. On 14 June 2019, the band released their third album Doom Days. It reached the top 5 in both the UK and US. The band made their Pyramid Stage debut at Glastonbury on 28 June 2019 as part of their promotion of the album. On 20 September 2019, they released 'Million Pieces' from the Doom Days album at the Abbey Road studios with The Chamber Orchestra of London, which was one of the new songs on the extended album Doom Days (This Got Out Of Hand). A music video for the band's song "Bad Decisions" was released on 25 September 2019. The fifth single from Doom Days, "Another Place", was released on 25 October 2019 with Canadian singer Alessia Cara, as a rework of the original song on the album, with the second verse being changed to one written by Cara. On 6 December 2019, an extended version of the album was released with 11 new songs titled Doom Days (This Got Out Of Hand).

=== Give Me the Future and Bad Blood X (2020–2023) ===
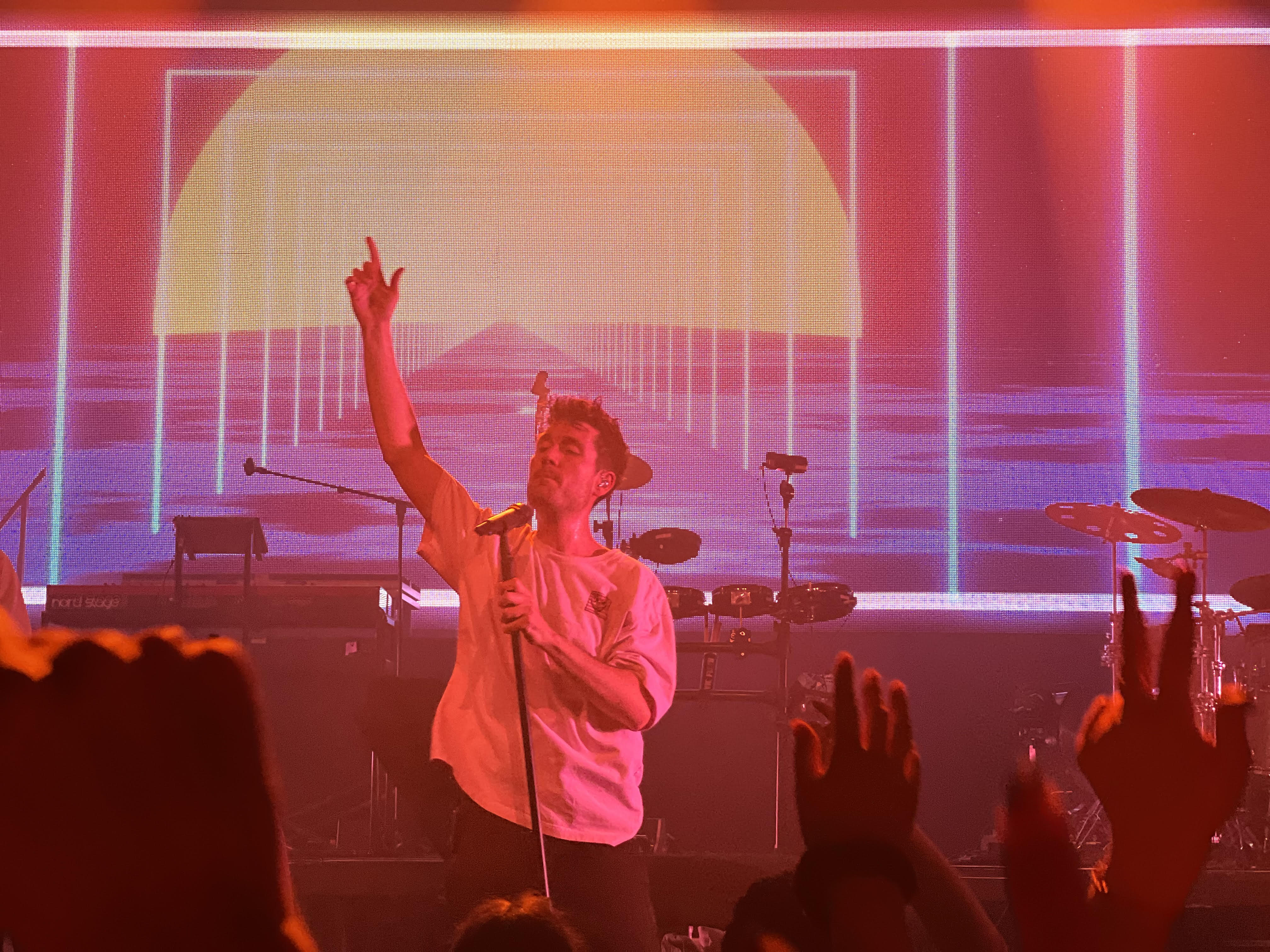
Smith performing in Memphis, Tennessee in 2022

The band was one of 23 artists to feature on the Live Lounge Allstars cover of the Foo Fighters song "Times Like These" to help raise funds for the COVID-19 pandemic. The song was released on 23 April 2020, and 8 days later, became the band's third UK #1 single. On 30 July 2020, Bastille released a new song with Graham Coxon titled "What You Gonna Do???". All This Bad Blood was released as a limited edition 2LP for Record Store Day 2020, for the first time on 29 August 2020. On 22 September 2020, the band released a new song titled "Survivin'" which premiered on Apple Music's Zane Lowe Show. "What You Gonna Do???" and "Survivin'" were accompanied by another single "Goosebumps" on the EP, Goosebumps EP, released on 4 December 2020. "Goosebumps" was released on the same day and features Kenny Beats.

The band released an ReOrchestrated version of their song "Warmth" from their second album Wild World as an Amazon Music exclusive on 15 January 2021. The audio was taken from their ReOrchestrated live show from the Elbphilharmonie in Hamburg from 4 January 2020. An EP entitled "Roots of ReOrchestrated" was released on 19 March 2021. The band headlined Standon Calling festival on 27 July and Latitude Festival on 29 July with their ReOrchestrated show.

On 23 June, they released the first single from their upcoming album, entitled "Distorted Light Beam". The song was co-written and co-produced with OneRepublic lead singer Ryan Tedder. On 15 July 2021, Bastille released the second single and title track from their fourth album Give Me the Future. On 10 August 2021, Dan Smith confirmed that a fourth album had been finished and already been pressed on CD and vinyl. On 18 August 2021, the third single "Thelma + Louise" was released, with an accompanying music video released on 2 September. On 1 October 2021, Bastille teased the fourth single from Give Me The Future. On 19 October 2021, they released "No Bad Days" and Dan Smith, speaking with Zane Lowe, said that the album would be released on 4 February 2022. "Shut Off the Lights" was released on 14 January 2022. The album became the band's third UK number one album.

An extended version of the album, Give Me the Future + Dreams of the Past was announced on 28 July 2022 for release on 26 August. Singles "Run Into Trouble", with Brazilian DJ Alok, "Remind Me" and "Revolution" were released on 1 April, 9 June and 28 July, respectively, ahead of the album.

For Record Store Day 2023, the band released an exclusive limited edition vinyl of their MTV Unplugged set from November 2021. The vinyl was released on 22 April 2023, and released digitally 6 days later. The live album features covers of Roberta Flack's "Killing Me Softly with His Song" and Nirvana's "Come as You Are".

On 14 June 2023, the band released "No Angels", a mashup of The xx song "Angels" and "No Scrubs" by TLC, featuring Ella Eyre, originally featured in the band's 2012 mixtape Other People's Heartache, Pt. 2. In conjunction, they announced a celebratory double album Bad Blood X to commemorate the 10th anniversary of their debut album Bad Blood. On 1 September 2023, the band released a commemorative orchestral rendition of "Pompeii", collaborating with composer Hans Zimmer on the project. Titled "Pompeii MMXXIII", the release of the song coincided with the 10th anniversary of the track's original release in 2013.

=== "&" (2024–2025) ===
On 22 July 2024, Bastille announced a four-part project named "&" (pronounced "ampersand"). The first four songs from the project were released four days later, with a full album releasing on 25 October. The project, a concept album based on personal stories in history, features acoustic songs written by Dan Smith with collaborators being featured as instrumentalists. The album release was accompanied by a 14 episode podcast called Muses, "An Ampersand Podcast" with Dr. Emma Nagouse, a producer from the history podcast You're Dead to Me.

=== From All Sides (2025–present) ===
On 21 March 2025, Bastille announced the From All Sides Tour, taking place throughout November 2025 to celebrate 15 years of the band. The new song "Save My Soul" was played on all the dates, and was later released as a single on 21 November 2025.

== Name, musical style and influences ==
The name of the band derives from Bastille Day, which is celebrated on 14 July, Smith's birthday.

Bastille's musical style has been described as indie pop, pop rock, synth-pop, electropop, alternative rock, pop, and indie rock. Smith himself has characterized their music as heavily cinematic. This is evident in their second studio album, Wild World, and their Other People's Heartache mixtapes, which incorporate audio clips from various sources, including television, film, and even a United States Department of Justice informational video. Smith's affinity for film stems from his upbringing, where he viewed it as his primary obsession. He has mentioned that incorporating samples from movies into their songs was a natural progression for the band, starting with their first mixtape, Other People's Heartache. In an article published by music magazine The Line of Best Fit, Smith writes: "Our mixtapes started life with a cover that we used to play of "What Would You Do?" by City High, back when we only had about six songs we could play live. We needed something to fill out the set and it was a song that I remembered affectionately from when I was a kid. Whenever we played it people would find themselves singing along and trying to figure out where they knew it from".

Another large influence on the band's earlier works was director David Lynch. For instance, the penultimate track on Bastille's album Bad Blood, titled "Laura Palmer", pays tribute to the tragic prom queen from Lynch's Twin Peaks. The album's cover, featuring Dan Smith caught in a car's headlights on a nocturnal country road, also exudes a Lynchian feel. Moreover, another single, "Falling", from their mixtape Other People's Heartache, integrates parts of the song "Falling" by Julee Cruise, known as the theme song for Twin Peaks, mixed with their own song "Laura Palmer". In fact, Rob Da Bank, who was releasing Lynch's second album, approached Smith to do a remix of one of Lynch's songs. Lynch's positive reception of the remix further solidified their connection, culminating in a personal invitation to his house for coffee. This encounter left a lasting impression on Smith, as he described Lynch as "overwhelmingly kind, funny, and inquisitive" in an article published on Redbull's website.

Bastille was also one of the artists involved in "Radio 1 Rescores Drive", a collaborative initiative spearheaded by DJ and radio presenter Zane Lowe. The band contributed "The Driver" to the soundtrack for the 2011 film Drive starring Ryan Gosling, and the song was included on Bastille's own mixtape, VS. (Other People's Heartache, Pt. III).

The band collaborated with Hans Zimmer in the form of their single "Pompeii MMXXIII", transforming Bastille's "Pompeii" into a version reminiscent of Zimmer's film soundtracks. In speaking about this collaboration, Bastille's Dan Smith expressed a sense of validation and honor to work alongside a figure like Zimmer, stating, "It does feel like we have come full circle in a way. So many of the songs we have, particularly on Bad Blood, have strings or loads of choir parts which I sang. So to get to a point where we can do this version with a real choir and orchestra and with someone like Zimmer – who is responsible for so many huge cultural moments for me – is exciting and a privilege."

The band's repertoire also often includes covers and samples from a variety of artists. Examples include their rendition of "Killing Me Softly with His Song" by Roberta Flack in the Bad Blood X version of their album Bad Blood, "Dancing in the Dark" by Bruce Springsteen for the edition "Give Me The Future + Dreams of the Past" of the studio album Give Me the Future, "Can't Fight This Feeling" by REO Speedwagon (featured in a Christmas advert for British department store John Lewis & Partners in 2019), and "Basket Case" by Green Day (released as a soundtrack for The Tick TV series.)

Frontman Dan Smith has cited many artists as influences, including Kate Bush, Amy Winehouse, Lorde, Christine and the Queens, and the Cranberries. He has particularly highlighted Regina Spektor as an early influence on his songwriting. During an interview with MTV UK, he shared: "When I first heard 'Us' by Regina Spektor, it made me want to record and write songs. I thought the way she told this quite weird story with her words was amazing, and I liked how interesting and unique her voice was. I'm someone with quite a weird annoying voice, so that made me think, well, if she can do it, I can have a crack. [...] I thought the production was really beautiful, simple, on piano. [...] That made me think that this slightly weird, awkward teenager who could sort of play piano and sort of sing could start writing songs."

== Media ==
=== Television ===
Bastille's music has been used on the TV soap opera Hollyoaks with one week in the early summer of 2013 focused on Bastille's song "Laura Palmer". Their music has also been on Made in Chelsea and Waterloo Road. The song "Oblivion" was featured in season 4 episode 9 of The Vampire Diaries in December 2012 and "Things We Lost in the Fire" in episode 22 of the same season. "Things We Lost in the Fire" was also used in the 2014 autumn trailer for the BBC soap opera EastEnders and as the name of a 2015 episode of Grey's Anatomy. The band can also be heard on Teen Wolf and on the fourth episode of season 1 of How to Get Away with Murder with the Naughty Boy collaboration "No One's Here to Sleep". The song "Haunt" can be heard in the season 1 finale of the TV series Finding Carter. The song "Blame" is featured in season 1 episode 4 of the Marvel series Runaways.

In August 2017, the band released a version of the Green Day song "Basket Case" for the Peter Serafinowicz series The Tick.

=== Film ===
Their song "Pompeii" is featured in the 2014 movie Mr. Peabody & Sherman. The band's song "The Driver" was used in the re-scored soundtrack of the 2011 film Drive produced for the BBC by Zane Lowe for its October 2014 TV broadcast. The band also featured on the Kill Your Friends (2015) soundtrack with a cover of the Sugababes debut single "Overload". On 9 November 2017, the band released a music video for "World Gone Mad", a song for the Netflix movie Bright. Their song "Those Nights" was used in 2020 movie All My Life.

On 10 February 2021, the band released their Amazon original documentary "Bastille - ReOrchestrated".

=== Video games ===
Their song "Pompeii" is featured in racing game, DiRT 4, First Touch game, First Touch Soccer 15, the Konami game Pro Evolution Soccer 2015, Fortnite, and a remix of the song is featured in Need for Speed Rivals. The band's music has appeared in the FIFA video games three times: "Weight of Living, Pt. II" in FIFA 13, "Hangin'" in FIFA 16 and "Send Them Off!" in FIFA 17.

Bastille's music has also been featured in the simulation game The Sims 3 in the Supernatural DLC, specifically the song "Laura Palmer" which is dubbed over in the video game's language of Simlish.

=== Advertisements ===
In 2019, a cover of "Can't Fight This Feeling" was recorded by the band for the John Lewis and Waitrose Christmas advert.

The band performed "Pompeii" at Birmingham New Street railway station for a TV advert for EE in November 2019. The gig was a world first as it was streamed via 5G and captured in augmented reality. The advert was released on 13 January 2020.

In May 2021, the band recorded a cover of The Turtles song "Happy Together" for a Spanish Toyota advert.

== Television appearances ==
=== Singles promotion ===
Bastille performed "Pompeii" on The Jonathan Ross Show (2013). They also went on to play the song on The Voice van Vlaanderen (2013), Conan, making their American TV debut (2013), The Ellen DeGeneres Show (2013) and Jimmy Kimmel Live! (2013). They performed "Pompeii" along with "Oblivion" on Saturday Night Live (2014). They performed "Laura Palmer" on Sunday Brunch (2013). They performed "Of the Night" on Alan Carr: Chatty Man (2013). They returned to The Ellen DeGeneres Show and Jimmy Kimmel Live! in 2014 to perform "Flaws". They performed "Bad Blood" on Jimmy Kimmel Live! (2013), The Late Show with David Letterman (2014), Conan (2014) and Late Night with Seth Meyers (2014). They performed "Good Grief" on The Ellen DeGeneres Show (2016), The Tonight Show Starring Jimmy Fallon (2016), Alan Carr's Happy Hour and RTL Late Night (2016). They performed "Send Them Off!" on Sunday Brunch (2016). They performed "Blame" on Late Night with Seth Meyers (2017) and The Late Late Show Starring James Corden (2017). They performed "World Gone Mad" at the final of the 13th season of The Voice with contestant Noah Mac (2017). Alongside Craig David, Dan Smith performed "I Know You" alone on Sounds Like Friday Night (2017), before the rest of the band joined them to perform the song at the semi-final of the 15th series of Strictly Come Dancing (2017). The band made their fourth appearance on Jimmy Kimmel Live! (2018) when they performed "Quarter Past Midnight". Along with Marshmello, Smith performed their collaboration, "Happier", on Good Morning America (2018) and then at the final of the 15th season of The Voice with the entire band (2018). They performed "Joy" on The Voice van Vlaanderen (2019) and The Graham Norton Show (2019). The band performed "Distorted Light Beam" at the Team GB 2020 Summer Olympics homecoming (2021). "Thelma + Louise" was performed live on GMA3 (2021). "No Bad Days" was performed live on Sunday Brunch alone by Smith (2021). The band performed twice on The Late Late Show Starring James Corden (2022), playing "Shut Off The Lights" and "Give Me The Future".

=== Other performances ===
The band performed at the New Year's Eve Party 2015 at Hollywood, which was broadcast on Dick Clark's New Year's Rockin' Eve, whilst they headlined the 2019 New Year's Eve Party. The band performed as one of the summer concert lineup for The TODAY Show (2016). They performed their song "Fake It" on Jimmy Kimmel Live! (2016). The band have performed on Sunday Brunch to promote their album Doom Days (2019). The band performed on Good Morning America as part of the GMA Summer Concert Series in 2019, as well as in 2021. The band performed "Bad Decisions" on The Tonight Show Starring Jimmy Fallon. Their mashup of Joy Crookes' song "Anyone But Me" and Easy Life's song "Nightmares", was shown on Channel 4 as part of highlights from Barclaycard Share The Stage highlights (2020). The band performed as part of the charity event Love Not War for War Child, which was shown on 20 December 2021 on Sky Max. The band's MTV Unplugged performance from Porchester Hall was shown on MTV Music on 23 December 2021 and globally throughout late December. The band performed as the headline act at the final of the 2022 season of The Hundred, and it was shown live on BBC Two and Sky Sports.

=== Award ceremonies ===
The band performed "Pompeii" at the Brit Awards (2014) as part of a mashup with Ella Eyre and Rudimental with their song "Waiting All Night". They also performed the song at the iHeartRadio Music Awards (2014). They performed "Happier" at the MTV EMAs (2018) as part of a collaboration with Marshmello and Anne-Marie, who sang their song "Friends".

=== Game of Thrones ===
In 2017 Simmons and tour manager Dick Meredith, featured as extras in the final episode of season 7 of Game of Thrones. Smith and other members of the band participated in filming, but did not appear in the final episode.

== Band members ==
=== Current members ===
- Dan Smith – lead vocals, piano, keyboards, guitar, percussion, programming (2010–present)
- Kyle Simmons – piano, keyboards, percussion, backing vocals, bass (2010–present)
- Will Farquarson – bass, guitar, backing vocals, piano, keyboards (2010–present)
- Chris "Woody" Wood – drums, percussion, backing vocals (2010–present)

=== Touring members ===
- Charlie Barnes – guitar, piano, keyboards, synthesizers, backing vocals, percussion, bass (2015–present)
- AK Patterson – guitar, strings, backing vocals (2025–present)
- Gabi King – percussion, backing vocals (2025–present)

=== Former touring members ===
- Bim Amoake-Gyampah – backing vocals (2022–2023; occasional 2018–2021)
- Senab Adekunle – backing vocals (2022–2023; occasional 2018–2021)

== Discography ==
Studio albums

- Bad Blood (2013)
- Wild World (2016)
- Doom Days (2019)
- Give Me the Future (2022)
- "&" (2024)

== Awards and nominations ==
Bastille have won several music awards and landed many nominations, including ones for Brit Awards, Billboard Music Awards, World Music Awards, and Grammy Awards.
