= Happier (Marshmello and Bastille song) =

2018 song by Marshmello and Bastille

Single by Marshmello featuring Bastille
- Released: August 16, 2018
- Genre: Dance-pop; EDM trap
- Length: 3:35
- Label: Astralwerks
- Songwriters: Christopher Comstock; Dan Smith; Steve Mac
- Producer: Marshmello

Marshmello singles chronology
"Check This Out" (2018)	"Happier" (2018)	"Bayen Habeit (In Love)" (2018)

Bastille singles chronology
"Quarter Past Midnight" (2018)	"Happier" (2018)	"Grip" (2018)

Remix covers
- Remixes EP cover

Music video
- "Happier" on YouTube

"Happier" is a song by American DJ Marshmello featuring British indie pop band Bastille (mainly the vocals of the band's frontman, Dan Smith). Written by Marshmello, Smith, and Steve Mac, and produced by the former, it was released on August 16, 2018. It reached number two on both the UK Singles Chart and the Billboard Hot 100 and is the highest-charting single for Marshmello in both the UK and the US (eventually tying with "Come & Go" with Juice WRLD on the latter). It is also Bastille's highest-charting single as well on both charts surpassing their 2013 single "Pompeii"'s number five peak on the Hot 100 and tying at its number two peak on the UK chart. It also logged 27 weeks in the top ten of the Hot 100. The song also currently holds the record for most weeks spent at number one on the US Dance/Electronic Songs chart, with 69 weeks as of January 2020. The song was ranked number 33 on the Billboard Hot 100 decade-end chart of the 2010s, becoming the highest-ranking song to not top the Billboard Hot 100 weekly chart.

The song was performed live at the 2018 MTV Europe Music Awards along with another Marshmello song, "Friends" (with Anne-Marie).

== Background ==
Dan Smith, frontman of Bastille, had originally written 'Happier' for Justin Bieber but the band ultimately decided to keep it for themselves. "We've been having a great time writing for other artists in and amongst making our Bastille albums and mixtapes," Smith told NME. "Last year we wrote a song called 'Happier' and everyone got really excited about it so we thought it would be good as a collaboration. We had a really interesting time getting to work on it with Marshmello who managed to find some euphoria in a pretty melancholy, direct song. It's always good to step into somebody else's world for a minute and we're excited to be a part of it."

== Composition ==
"Happier" is an upbeat pop song that draws elements from pop rock. Lyrically, the song tells "the tale of a love that's over before one party wants to accept it." Billboard's Kat Bein opined that it "sounds a little more like his radio-forward hits."

== Lawsuit ==
In May 2019, Russian trance producer Arty filed a lawsuit against Marshmello for copyright infringement, citing that "Happier" stole song elements from Arty's remix of the song "I Lived" by OneRepublic. According to the suit, it is possible that Marshmello had become familiar with Arty's remix, released in 2014, and had used song elements in his then-upcoming song "Happier," which did not debut until 2015. Alongside Marshmello, other defendants in the case include Dan Smith, Steve Mac, and various music publishing companies. Arty is represented by attorney Richard Busch, who had previously represented the Marvin Gaye family in the "Blurred Lines" suit. A federal judge rejected the case in April 2021, stating that Arty had given up ownership of the remix composition in his contract and therefore had no grounds to sue. A federal appeals court later upheld the ruling in March 2022.

== Music video ==
Three music videos were released to support the single. The initially released one was a simple lyric video. This was followed by a performance video featuring Marshmello playing guitar with the bandmembers of Bastille playing their own instruments and Dan Smith singing. At the very end, Smith low fives Marshmello.

On September 24, 2018, Marshmello released the official music video through YouTube Premiere, starring Miranda Cosgrove as a teenager who has braces, along with Teala Dunn, Jordyn Jones and James Babson as the father. The music video focuses on Cosgrove's character. The color yellow and Marshmello's logo feature throughout the video, but neither he nor anyone from Bastille appear in the video. The video was directed by Mercedes Bryce Morgan and photographed by cinematographer Steve Gainer.

=== Synopsis ===
During the main character's 14th birthday party, which is shown to be a disappointment, her father gifts her a yellow bow. This bow is gifted along side a surprise Golden Retriever puppy, on which the yellow bow was presumably for. As she becomes a teenager, the dog grows along with her. The video cuts some years to high school, where she attempts to join a soccer team but is picked last and shown to be socially rejected. The video contrasts this explicit social exclusion with a shot of her playing soccer with her dog. In the next scene, while posing for a team photo, her teammates push her out from the picture. When she smiles, her teammates see her braces and make fun of her. She runs home and cries, but her dog is there to cheer her up. She tries to play with the dog as usual, but the age of the dog is starting to show and it is revealed that the dog is ill. Months pass, and although the dog is treated with medicine, the dog's illness presumably worsens. The dog is taken to the vet who has a private conversation with the girl's father, to whom he reveals the dog's illness to be terminal. The girl's father explains to his distraught daughter that the dog will need to be euthanized. She has an emotional parting exchange, and takes the dog's bow as a keepsake. 20 years later and the girl grows to have a daughter of her own. During her daughter's birthday party, her grandfather similarly gifts her a red bow, and a Golden Retriever puppy. The woman smiles at her daughter's joy and a single tear falls from her eye before she joins her daughter in embracing the new puppy.

== Track listings ==
- Digital download
1. "Happier" – 3:34
- Digital download – acoustic
1. "Happier" (stripped) – 4:10
- CD single
1. "Happier" – 3:34
2. "Happier" (Breathe Carolina remix) – 2:38
- Digital download – remixes EP
1. "Happier" (Frank Walker remix) – 3:16
2. "Happier" (Breathe Carolina remix) – 2:38
3. "Happier" (Spence remix) – 3:15
4. "Happier" (Blanke remix) – 3:21
- Digital download – remixes (part 2) EP
1. "Happier" (Jauz remix) – 4:03
2. "Happier" (Svdden Death remix) – 4:48
3. "Happier" (West Coast Massive remix) – 3:28
4. "Happier" (Matt Medved remix) – 2:50
5. "Happier" (Hikeii remix) – 3:06
6. "Happier" (Tim Gunter remix) – 3:31

== Credits and personnel ==
Credits adapted from Tidal.

- Marshmello – production, songwriting
- Bastille – vocals, songwriting
- Robin Florent – mixing assistance
- Scott Desmarais – mixing assistance
- Emerson Mancini – master engineering
- Chris Galland – mix engineering
- Manny Marroquin – mixing
- Steve Mac – vocal production

== Charts ==
=== Weekly charts ===
Chart (2018–2020)	Peak position
Argentina (Argentina Hot 100)	58
Australia (ARIA)	3
Austria (Ö3 Austria Top 40)	5
Belgium (Ultratop 50 Flanders)	7
Belgium (Ultratop 50 Wallonia)	5
Bolivia (Monitor Latino)	7
Brazil (Top 100 Brasil)	57
Canada Hot 100 (Billboard)	2
Canada AC (Billboard)	4
Canada CHR/Top 40 (Billboard)	1
Canada Hot AC (Billboard)	1
Canada Rock (Billboard)	36
Colombia (National-Report)	50
Croatia (HRT)	6
Czech Republic Airplay (ČNS IFPI)	22
Czech Republic Singles Digital (ČNS IFPI)	5
Denmark (Tracklisten)	9
Euro Digital Song Sales (Billboard)	6
Finland (Suomen virallinen lista)	19
France (SNEP)	24
Germany (GfK)	9
Germany Dance (Official German Charts)	3
Global 200 (Billboard)	159
Hungary (Rádiós Top 40)	5
Hungary (Single Top 40)	24
Hungary (Stream Top 40)	5
Ireland (IRMA)	2
Italy (FIMI)	11
Japan Hot 100 (Billboard)	44
Lebanon (Lebanese Top 20)	1
Lithuania (AGATA)	5
Malaysia (RIM)	3
Mexico Airplay (Billboard)	1
Mexico Ingles Airplay (Billboard)	2
Netherlands (Dutch Top 40)	5
Netherlands (Single Top 100)	5
New Zealand (Recorded Music NZ)	3
Norway (VG-lista)	7
Poland Airplay (ZPAV)	57
Portugal (AFP)	5
Puerto Rico (Monitor Latino)	12
Romania (Airplay 100)	18
Scotland Singles (Official Charts)	5
Singapore (RIAS)	1
Slovakia Airplay (ČNS IFPI)	18
Slovakia Singles Digital (ČNS IFPI)	7
Slovenia (SloTop50)	5
Spain (Promusicae)	34
Sweden (Sverigetopplistan)	4
Switzerland (Schweizer Hitparade)	10
UK Singles (Official Charts)	2
US Billboard Hot 100	2
US Adult Contemporary (Billboard)	8
US Adult Pop Airplay (Billboard)	2
US Dance Club Songs (Billboard)	1
US Hot Dance/Electronic Songs (Billboard)	1
US Pop Airplay (Billboard)	1
US Rhythmic Airplay (Billboard)	39
US Rock & Alternative Airplay (Billboard)	2
US Rolling Stone Top 100	55
Venezuela (National-Report)	23

=== Monthly charts ===
Chart (2019)	Peak position
Brazil Streaming (Pro-Música Brasil)	44

=== Year-end charts ===
Chart (2018)	Position
Australia (ARIA)	33
Austria (Ö3 Austria Top 40)	29
Belgium (Ultratop Flanders)	56
Belgium (Ultratop Wallonia)	70
Canada (Canadian Hot 100)	68
Denmark (Tracklisten)	68
Estonia (Eesti Tipp-40)	64
Germany (Official German Charts)	78
Netherlands (Dutch Top 40)	21
Netherlands (Single Top 100)	43
Portugal (AFP)	44
Sweden (Sverigetopplistan)	53
Switzerland (Schweizer Hitparade)	64
UK Singles (OCC)	62
US Billboard Hot 100	80
US Alternative Songs (Billboard)	31
US Hot Dance/Electronic Songs (Billboard)	7
US Mainstream Top 40 (Billboard)	45
US Rock Airplay (Billboard)	33
Chart (2019)	Position
Australia (ARIA)	21
Belgium (Ultratop Flanders)	43
Belgium (Ultratop Wallonia)	82
Canada (Canadian Hot 100)	5
Denmark (Tracklisten)	64
France (SNEP)	127
Germany (Official German Charts)	80
Hungary (Rádiós Top 40)	58
Hungary (Single Top 40)	90
Italy (FIMI)	52
Latvia (LAIPA)	39
Netherlands (Single Top 100)	91
New Zealand (Recorded Music NZ)	25
Portugal (AFP)	31
Romania (Airplay 100)	82
Slovenia (SloTop50)	41
Sweden (Sverigetopplistan)	58
Switzerland (Schweizer Hitparade)	48
UK Singles (OCC)	37
US Billboard Hot 100	6
US Adult Contemporary (Billboard)	21
US Adult Top 40 (Billboard)	8
US Alternative Songs (Billboard)	3
US Hot Dance/Electronic Songs (Billboard)	1
US Mainstream Top 40 (Billboard)	16
US Rock Airplay (Billboard)	3
US Rolling Stone Top 100	28
Chart (2020)	Position
US Hot Dance/Electronic Songs (Billboard)	5

=== Decade-end charts ===
Chart (2010–2019)	Position
US Billboard Hot 100	33
US Hot Dance/Electronic Songs (Billboard)	1

== Certifications ==
Region	Certification	Certified units/sales
Australia (ARIA)	6× Platinum	420,000^{‡}
Austria (IFPI Austria)	3× Platinum	90,000^{‡}
Belgium (BRMA)	Platinum	40,000^{‡}
Brazil (Pro-Música Brasil)	6× Diamond	960,000^{‡}
Canada (Music Canada)	6× Platinum	480,000^{‡}
Denmark (IFPI Danmark)	2× Platinum	180,000^{‡}
France (SNEP)	Diamond	333,333^{‡}
Germany (BVMI)	3× Gold	600,000^{‡}
Italy (FIMI)	2× Platinum	100,000^{‡}
Mexico (AMPROFON)	3× Platinum+Gold	210,000^{‡}
New Zealand (RMNZ)	7× Platinum	210,000^{‡}
Poland (ZPAV)	4× Platinum	200,000^{‡}
Portugal (AFP)	3× Platinum	30,000^{‡}
Spain (Promusicae)	2× Platinum	120,000^{‡}
United Kingdom (BPI)	4× Platinum	2,400,000^{‡}
United States (RIAA)	Diamond	10,000,000^{‡}
Streaming
Japan (RIAJ)	Gold	50,000,000^{†}
Sweden (GLF)	3× Platinum	24,000,000^{†}
^{‡} Sales+streaming figures based on certification alone.^{†} Streaming-only figures based on certification alone.

== Awards ==
Year	Organization	Recipient(s)	Category	Result
2019	International Dance Music Awards	Happier	Best Pop/Electronic Song	Won

== Release history ==
Region	Date	Format	Version	Label	Ref.
Various	August 16, 2018	Digital download	Original	Astralwerks; Joytime Collective	
United States	August 21, 2018	Contemporary hit radio	Original	Astralwerks; Capitol	
Various	October 19, 2018	Digital download	Remixes EP	Astralwerks; Joytime Collective	
Various	November 9, 2018	Digital download	Acoustic	Astralwerks; Joytime Collective	
Germany	November 23, 2018	CD single	Original	Universal Music Group	
Various	November 30, 2018	Digital download	Remixes (Part 2) EP	Astralwerks; Joytime Collective	

== See also ==
- List of number-one songs of 2018 (Singapore)
