= Doom Days =

Studio album by Bastille
- Released: 14 June 2019
- Genre: Electropop; new wave
- Length: 40:00 (Original release); 78:56 (This Got Out of Hand)
- Label: Virgin EMI; Virgin; Universal
- Producer: Bastille; Mark Crew; Dan Priddy

Bastille chronology
Other People's Heartache, Pt. 4 (2018)	Doom Days (2019)	Give Me the Future (2022)

Singles from Doom Days
- 1. "Quarter Past Midnight" Released: 9 May 2018; 2. "Doom Days" Released: 25 April 2019; 3. "Joy" Released: 2 May 2019; 4. "Those Nights" Released: 4 June 2019

Doom Days (This Got Out of Hand)
- Cover of reissue

Singles from Doom Days (This Got Out of Hand)
- 1. "Another Place" Released: 25 October 2019; 2. "Can't Fight This Feeling" Released: 19 November 2019

Doom Days (stylised as "DOOM D∆YS") is the third studio album by British indie pop band Bastille, released on 14 June 2019 by Virgin EMI Records. It was preceded by the release of the four singles "Quarter Past Midnight", "Doom Days", "Joy" and "Those Nights", and followed by "Another Place". "Those Nights" was premiered on Beats 1 with Zane Lowe on 4 June 2019. The band played music festivals in the UK and across Europe from May to August 2019 in support of the album. An extended version of the album was released on 6 December 2019 with 11 extra tracks.

== Background ==
The album was described as a concept album about a "colourful" night at a party, as well as "the importance of escapism, hope and the preciousness of close friendships". The party was additionally described as having an atmosphere of "turbulent emotional chaos" and "euphoria, carelessness and a small dose of madness". Each song is set at a specific time during this night; these times were also revealed through the Doom Days Society website.

Conceptual song order
Song	Time
"Quarter Past Midnight"	00:15
"Bad Decisions"	00:48
"The Waves"	01:22
"Divide"	02:05
"Million Pieces"	02:39
"Doom Days"	03:07
"Nocturnal Creatures"	03:28
"4AM"	04:00
"Another Place"	04:52
"Those Nights"	05:46
"Joy"	08:34

== Promotion ==
In addition to its four singles, the album's track listing was revealed through the website Doom Days Society on 2 May, where the band revealed each track in order with a short introductory video.

== Critical reception ==
Professional ratings
Aggregate scores
Source	Rating
AnyDecentMusic?	6.8/10
Metacritic	72/100
Review scores
Source	Rating
AllMusic	4/5 stars
Clash	8/10
DIY	4/5 stars
The Line of Best Fit	5.5/10
The Music	2/5 stars
NME	4/5 stars
PopMatters	4/10
Q	4/5 stars
The Skinny	4/5 stars
The Times	2/5 stars

On Metacritic, Doom Days received a score of 72 out of 100 from nine critics, indicating "generally favorable" reception. In a positive review, Rhian Daly of NME called the album "a vivid snapshot of humanity and an imaginative, adventurous levelling up from one of Britain's most influential bands."

== Track listing ==
All tracks written by Dan Smith.

No.	Title	Producer(s)	Length
1.	"Quarter Past Midnight"	Mark Crew; Smith	3:19
2.	"Bad Decisions"	Crew; Smith	3:09
3.	"The Waves"	Crew; Smith	4:00
4.	"Divide"	Crew; Smith	3:52
5.	"Million Pieces"	Crew; Smith; Dan Priddy	4:11
6.	"Doom Days"	Crew; Smith; Priddy	2:18
7.	"Nocturnal Creatures"	Crew; Smith	3:52
8.	"4AM"	Crew; Smith	4:07
9.	"Another Place"	Crew; Smith; Priddy	3:31
10.	"Those Nights"	Crew; Smith	4:30
11.	"Joy"	Crew; Smith; Priddy	3:11
Total length:			40:00

Target exclusive bonus tracks
No.	Title	Length
12.	"When I Watch the World Burn All I Think About Is You" (demo)	3:12
13.	"Easy Days" (demo)	2:53
Total length:		46:05

This Got Out of Hand edition bonus tracks (digital only)
No.	Title	Length
12.	"Admit Defeat"	3:05
13.	"Good Lesson"	3:30
14.	"Easy Days" (demo)	2:52
15.	"When I Watch the World Burn All I Think About Is You" (demo)	3:12
16.	"Another Place" (featuring the Chamber Orchestra of London)	4:17
17.	"Final Hour"	3:08
18.	"Million Pieces" (featuring the Chamber Orchestra of London)	4:43
19.	"Comfort of Strangers"	3:49
20.	"Another Place" (with Alessia Cara)	3:33
21.	"Hangin'"	3:29
22.	"Can't Fight This Feeling" (featuring the London Contemporary Orchestra)	3:18
Total length:		78:56

== Charts ==
=== Weekly charts ===
Weekly chart performance for Doom Days
Chart (2019)	Peak position
Australian Albums (ARIA)	21
Austrian Albums (Ö3 Austria)	10
Belgian Albums (Ultratop Flanders)	5
Belgian Albums (Ultratop Wallonia)	35
Canadian Albums (Billboard)	30
Czech Albums (ČNS IFPI)	73
Dutch Albums (Album Top 100)	8
Finnish Albums (Suomen virallinen lista)	26
German Albums (Offizielle Top 100)	9
Irish Albums (IRMA)	18
Italian Albums (FIMI)	41
Latvian Albums (LAIPA)	13
Lithuanian Albums (AGATA)	8
New Zealand Albums (RMNZ)	30
Norwegian Albums (VG-lista)	14
Polish Albums (ZPAV)	22
Portuguese Albums (AFP)	22
Scottish Albums (OCC)	6
Spanish Albums (Promusicae)	35
Swedish Albums (Sverigetopplistan)	45
Swiss Albums (Schweizer Hitparade)	8
UK Albums (OCC)	4
US Billboard 200	5
US Top Alternative Albums (Billboard)	2
US Top Rock Albums (Billboard)	2

=== Year-end charts ===
Year-end chart performance for Doom Days
Chart (2019)	Position
Belgian Albums (Ultratop Flanders)	81
US Top Alternative Albums (Billboard)	42
US Top Rock Albums (Billboard)	85

== Certifications ==
Certifications for Doom Days
Region	Certification	Certified units/sales
Hungary (MAHASZ)	Gold	2,000^{‡}
United Kingdom (BPI)	Gold	100,000^{‡}
^{‡} Sales+streaming figures based on certification alone.
