= To Kill a King (band) =

British indie rock band

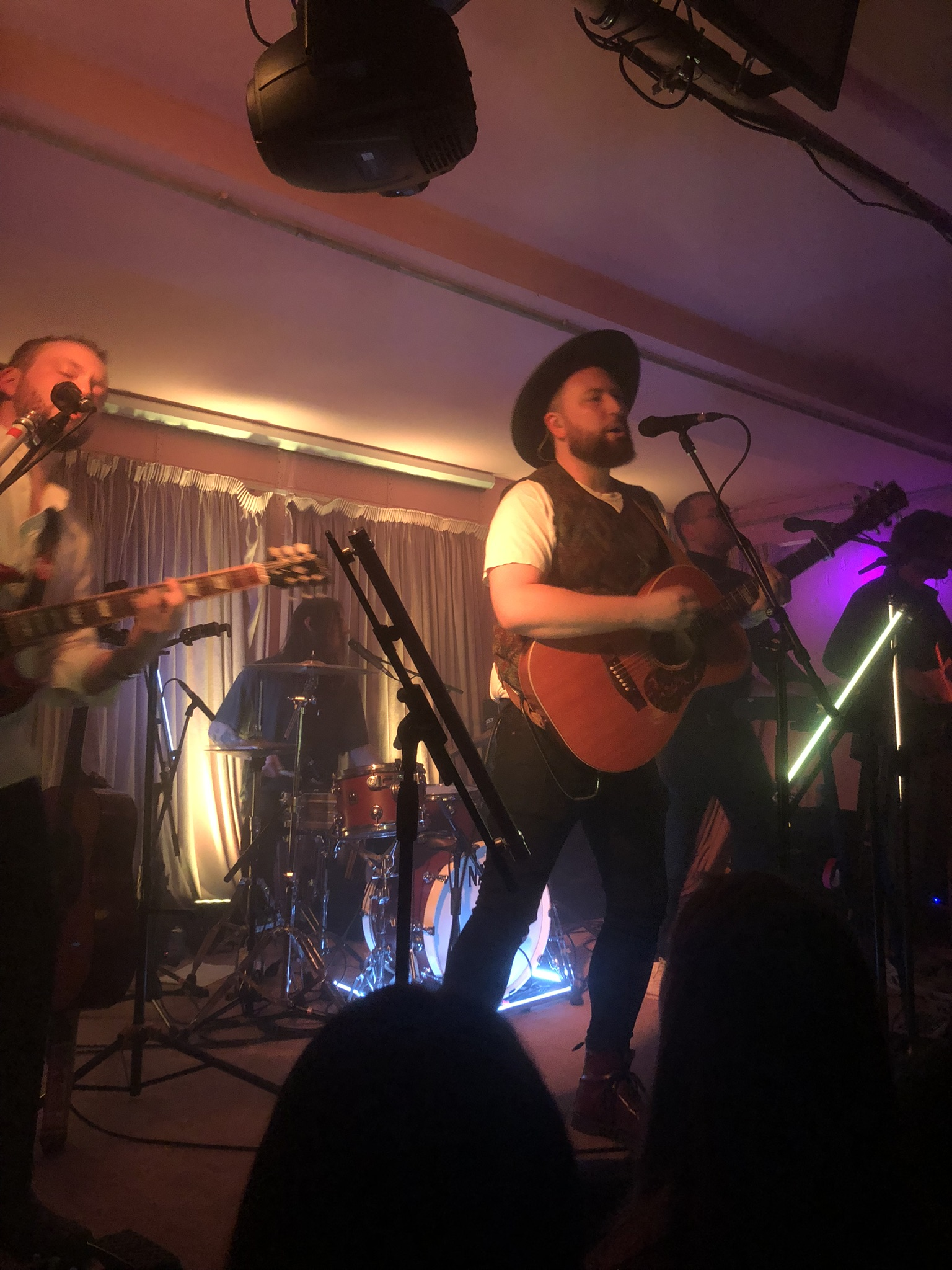
- To Kill a King performing at YES Pink Room in Manchester, January 2024

Background information
- Origin: London, England
- Genres: Indie rock; folk rock
- Years active: 2009–present
- Label: Communion Music
- Members: Ralph Pelleymounter; Josh Taffel; Grant McNeil; James Ball; Ben Jackson
- Website: tokillaking.co.uk

To Kill a King are an English indie rock band formed in 2009. The band consists of Ralph Pelleymounter (lead vocals, guitar), Ben Jackson (synthesiser), Grant McNeil (guitar), Josh Taffel (drums) and James Ball (bass). The band have released four studio albums to date, the last of which, 2025's The King is Dead, Long Live the King, was announced to be the band's final album.

== Discography ==
=== Studio albums ===
List of studio albums, with selected details and chart positions
Title	Details	Peak chart positions
Title	Details	UK Indie
Cannibals with Cutlery	Released: 7 October 2013; Label: Xtra Mile	–
To Kill a King	Released: 23 February 2015; Label: Xtra Mile	35
Spiritual Dark Age	Released: 12 January 2018; Label: These Are My Bones	23
The King Is Dead, Long Live the King	Released: 21 November 2025; Label: Tequila King	–

=== Extended plays ===
List of extended plays, with selected details and chart positions
Title	Details
My Crooked Saint	Released: 16 October 2011; Label: Tequila King
Word of Mouth	Released: 8 October 2012; Label: To Kill A King
Exit, Persued by a Bear	Released: 13 October 2014; Label: Xtra Mile
The King Is Dead	Released: 13 June 2025; Label: Xtra Mile
