= Dan Smith (singer) =

English singer-songwriter and multi-instrumentalist (born 1986)

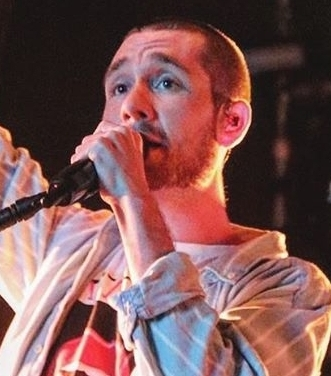
- Smith performing with Bastille at Strand Festival in Hungary in 2019

Background information
- Born: Daniel Campbell Smith; 14 July 1986 (age 40); London, England
- Genres: Indie pop; alternative rock; synth-pop; electropop; pop rock
- Occupations: Singer; songwriter; record producer
- Instruments: Vocals; piano; keyboards; guitar; melodica; programming; percussion
- Years active: 2006–present
- Labels: Virgin; Virgin EMI; EMI; Best Laid Plans
- Member of: Bastille
- Formerly of: Annie Oakley Hanging
- Website: bastillebastille.com

Daniel Campbell Smith (born 14 July 1986) is an English singer, songwriter and record producer, best known as the founder, lead singer and primary songwriter of the English pop rock band Bastille. The band formed in 2010 and gained mass popularity in 2013 when the song "Pompeii" was released with their album Bad Blood. The band then released their second album, Wild World in September 2016. In June 2019, the band released their third album Doom Days. In February 2022, they released their fourth album Give Me the Future. In October 2024, they released a solo project by Smith called "&".

== Career ==
Smith attended King's College School in Wimbledon, London, and the University of Leeds in Leeds, West Yorkshire, where he graduated with a degree in English Language and Literature while also writing about film and music for the Leeds student newspaper. A film obsessive from a young age, he originally wanted to be a director or editor until admitting he was "more of a fan than a filmmaker".

At age fifteen, Smith started writing songs on the piano and his laptop in his bedroom, but kept his music secret from his friends and family until he was persuaded by a friend to enter the Leeds Bright Young Things competition in 2007, which he ultimately became a finalist in. His early recordings included "Alchemy", "Words Are Words", "Irreverence", and "Dictator". Smith did not achieve mainstream success in his solo career but continued writing songs both alone and with his close friend and roommate Ralph Pelleymounter of the band To Kill a King. The two formed a side project called "Annie Oakley Hanging" which was described as "cowboy-like" by Pelleymounter.

After finishing his studies, Smith returned to London, where he continued pursuing his solo career, and eventually formed Bastille with Chris "Woody" Wood, Kyle Simmons, and Will Farquarson. Bastille has released five albums called Bad Blood, Wild World, Doom Days, Give Me the Future and their fifth studio album, "&", was released in October 2024.

In 2014, Dan Smith took part in the Band Aid charity single, "Do They Know It's Christmas?".

In 2015, Smith featured as vocalist for the song "La Lune", produced and written by the French electronic musician Madeon for his 2015 album Adventure. In the same year, Smith co-wrote and provided vocals on "Better Love" with Foxes, which was released 4 September 2015.

In 2017, he participated in the Grenfell Tower charity song, "Bridge Over Troubled Water".

Smith was part of the music video for the Charli XCX single "Boys" which was released on 26 July 2017.

He featured in the December 2017 ITV programme of The Nation's Favourite series which found out the nation's favourite Elton John song.

At the 2019 Brit Awards, Smith performed a duet with American artist, Pink, of her song, "Just Give Me a Reason", as part of her medley performance.

In November 2019, a cover of the REO Speedwagon song "Can't Fight This Feeling" sung by Smith was used in the John Lewis & Partners 2019 Christmas advert.

In 2023 he released a collaboration with Hans Zimmer doing an arrangement of Pompeii with a full orchestra. This was a part of the work he did as one of the composers for the Planet Earth III, and the track appeared in the promotional material as well as the end credits. In addition to collaborating in the scoring, he provided vocals which were used in the production alongside artists like Raye.

In May 2024, he was invited by Greenpeace on a trip to the Sargasso Sea on their ship the Arctic Sunrise to learn about and raise awareness for their campaign to protect the area. It was here that he and cinematographer Tavish Campbell filmed the music video for "Intros & Narrators", the first track from a project titled 'Bastille Presents "&", Part One'.

== Influences ==
Smith is a fan of the TV series Twin Peaks, and of one of its creators, David Lynch. The show inspired one of his first recorded songs, "Laura Palmer" and Bastille's first Virgin Records single "Overjoyed". Smith has said that his earlier work was influenced by Regina Spektor.

== Personal life ==
Smith writes and arranges some of Bastille's songs, apart from remixes and covers, and worked with friend Mark Crew to produce Bad Blood and Wild World. He plays the piano, keyboard, percussion, and melodica. His original, "Dan Smith Piano" was stolen in 2010. Smith's parents are South African lawyers who met at university.

During the COVID-19 pandemic in 2020, Smith performed music live on Instagram, and also set up a film club named 'Distraction Tactics', inspired by different countries around the world; each week the club visits a different country and film. Its aim is to provide distraction and happiness to those in need of some relief from social distancing and isolation.

== Songwriting credits ==
| Year | Artist | Album | Song | Co-written with |
|---|---|---|---|---|
| 2014 | Rag'n'Bone Man | Wolves EP | "Lay My Body Down" | Rory Graham, Daniel Priddy, Mark Crew |
| 2015 | Foxes | All I Need | "Better Love" | Louise Rose Allen, Jonathan Harris |
| 2015 | Madeon | Adventure | "La Lune" | Hugo Pierre Leclercq |
| 2016 | Banners | Non-album single | "Half Light" | Justin Parker |
| 2017 | Rag'n'Bone Man | Human | "Your Way or the Rope" | Rory Graham, Jamie Lidderdale, Lindsey Rome, Mark Crew |
| 2017 | Rationale | Rationale | "Into the Blue" | Tinashe Fazakerley, Daniel Priddy, Emily Schwartz, Mark Crew |
| 2018 | James Arthur | Non-album single | "At My Weakest" | James Arthur, Mark Crew |
| 2018 | Marshmello | Non-album single | "Happier" (Marshmello with BASTILLE) | Christopher Comstock, Steve Mac |
| 2019 | Gryffin | Gravity | "Hurt People" (with Aloe Blacc) | Daniel Griffith, Corey Saunders, Matthew Holmes, Philip Leigh |
| 2019 | Moss Kena | Non-album single | "Begging" | Moss Kena, Daniel Priddy, Mark Crew |
| 2020 | Tom Grennan | Evening Road | "This Is the Place" | Tom Grennan, Sarah Elizabeth Blanchard, Daniel Boyle, David Straaf, Richard Boardman |
| 2020 | Love Fame Tragedy | Five Songs to Briefly Fill the Void | "Multiply" (with Jack River) | Matthew Murphy, Mark Crew |
| 2021 | Clean Bandit | Non-album single | "Higher" (featuring Iann Dior) | Jack Patterson, Michael Olmo, Mark Ralph |
| 2023 | Lost Frequencies | Non-album single | "Head Down" | Felix de Laet, Johan Lindbrandt, Nicklas Lif, Dag Lundberg |
| 2024 | Myles Smith | A Minute... | "Nice to Meet You" | Myles Smith, Peter Fenn, Phil Plested |
| 2025 | Myles Smith | A Minute, a Moment... | "Whisper" | Myles Smith, Peter Fenn |
| 2025 | Myles Smith | A Minute, a Moment... | "All My Life" | Myles Smith, Peter Fenn, Phil Plested, Steph Jones, Will Bloomfield |
| 2026 | Illenium | Odyssey | "Feel Alive" | Nicholas Miller, Ben Kohn, Tom Barnes, Pete Kelleher, Dabin Lee |
| 2026 | Alice Merton | Visions | "Ignorance Is Bliss" | Alice Merton, Jennifer Decilveo, Paul Whalley |
| 2026 | Alice Merton | Visions | "Coasting" | Alice Merton, Jennifer Decilveo, Paul Whalley |
| 2026 | Alice Merton | Visions | "On the Wire" | Alice Merton, Jennifer Decilveo, Paul Whalley |
| 2026 | Alice Merton | Visions | "Willow Trees in Tokyo" | Alice Merton, Jennifer Decilveo, Paul Whalley |
| 2026 | Alice Merton | Visions | "Landline" | Alice Merton, Jennifer Decilveo, Paul Whalley |
