= List of songs recorded by Bastille =

Songs recorded by Bastille

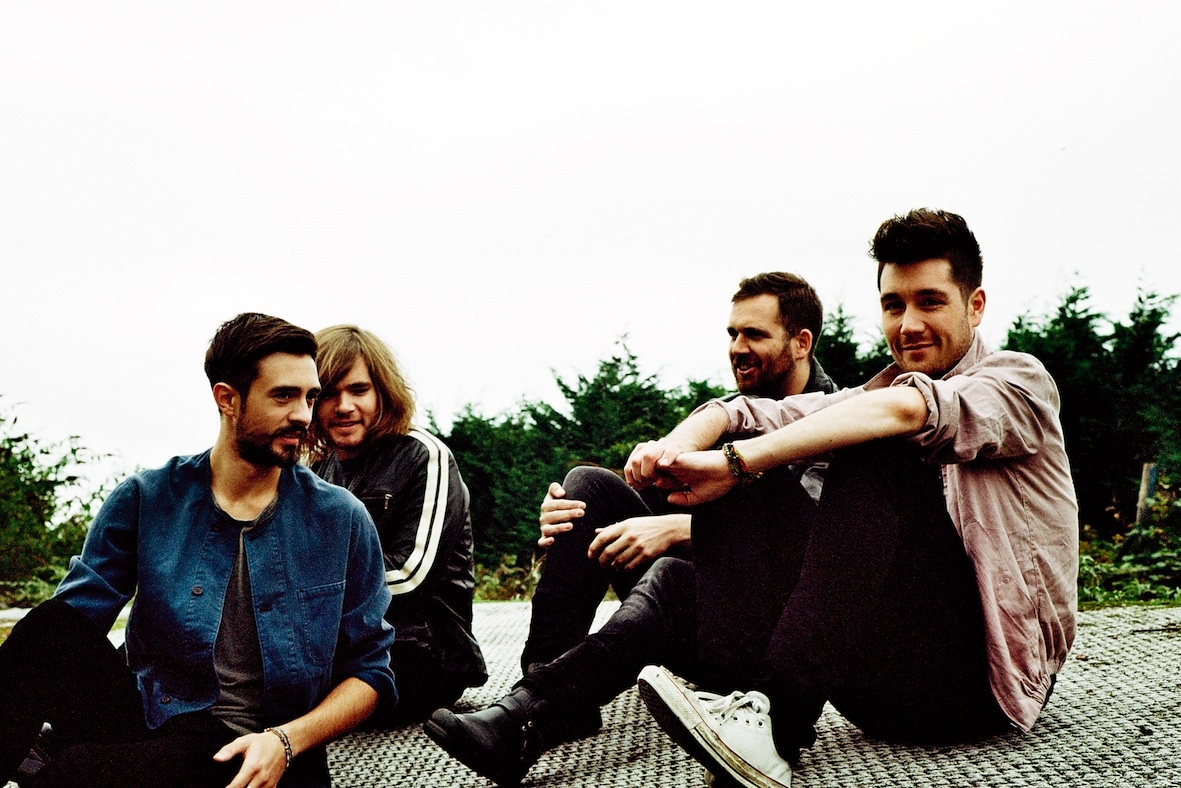
Members of Bastille: Kyle Simmons, Chris Wood, Will Farquarson and Dan Smith (Left to Right)

This is a comprehensive list of songs recorded by English indie pop band Bastille. Since the band formed in 2010, they have released four studio albums, one remix album, four mixtapes and twelve extended plays (EPs).

== Songs ==
Key
†	Indicates single release
‡	Indicates promotional single release
*	Solely features Dan Smith

Title	Length	Main Release	Year	Notes
"4AM"	4:07	Doom Days	2019	
"7 Days/Final Song"	4:23	BBC Radio 1's Live Lounge 2016	2016	Craig David, MØ and Europe cover
"Adagio for Strings (What Is Love)" (featuring Maiday)	3:59	Other People's Heartache	2012	Samuel Barber and Haddaway cover
"Admit Defeat"	3:05	Doom Days (This Got Out of Hand)	2019	
"An Act of Kindness"	3:28	Wild World	2016	
"Another Place"	3:31	Doom Days	2019	
"Another Place" (featuring Alessia Cara) †	3:33	Doom Days (This Got Out of Hand)	2019	
"Another Place" (featuring the Chamber Orchestra of London)	4:17	Doom Days (This Got Out of Hand)	2019	
"Axe To Grind" (featuring Tyde and Rationale)	4:48	VS. (Other People's Heartache, Pt. III)	2014	
"Back to the Future"	2:53	Give Me the Future	2022	
"Back to the Innerverse" (Interlude)	0:20	Give Me the Future (Deluxe Edition)	2022	
"Bad Blood" †	3:33	Bad Blood	2012	
"Bad Decisions"	3:09	Doom Days	2019	
"bad_news"	4:39	"Oblivion"	2014	Single B-side
"bad_news" (featuring MNEK)	4:48	VS. (Other People's Heartache, Pt. III)	2014	
"Basement" (featuring F*U*G*Z and F.Stokes)	3:51	Other People's Heartache, Pt. 2	2012	
"Basket Case"	2:34	The Tick	2017	Green Day cover Recorded for the TV series 'The Tick'
"Bathsheba & Him"	3:33	"&", Part Four	2025	
"Bite Down" (featuring HAIM)	3:00	VS. (Other People's Heartache, Pt. III)	2014	
"Blame" †	2:55	Wild World	2016	
"Blue Sky & The Painter"	3:52	"&"	2024	
"Bonnie & Clyde"	4:10	"&", Part Four	2025	
"Bored & Overboard (Pandora's Box"	3:27	"&", Part Four	2025	
"Brave New World" (Interlude)	0:27	Give Me the Future	2022	
"Bridge over Troubled Water" (as part of Artists for Grenfell) †	3:53	Non-album single	2017	Simon & Garfunkel cover
"Campus"	3:03	Wild World (Complete Edition)	2016	
"Can't Fight This Feeling" (featuring the London Contemporary Orchestra) †	3:18	Doom Days (This Got Out of Hand)	2019	REO Speedwagon cover Recorded for 2019 John Lewis & Partners Christmas advert
"Club 57"	3:12	Give Me the Future	2022	
"Come as You Are"	4:28	MTV Unplugged	2023	Nirvana cover
"Comfort of Strangers" ‡	3:49	Doom Days (This Got Out of Hand)	2017	Originally an exclusive single for Record Store Day 2017; Made available to streaming platforms via Doom Days (TGOOH)
"Dancing in the Dark (Apple Music Home Session)"	3:09	Give Me the Future + Dreams of the Past	2021	Bruce Springsteen cover Originally available for digital download on Apple Music Home Session: Bastille
"Daniel in the Den"	3:09	Bad Blood	2013	
"Died In Your Arms"	3:20	Virgin Records: 40 Years of Disruption	2013	Cutting Crew cover Also released on Bad Blood X
"Distorted Light Beam" †	2:57	Give Me the Future	2021	
"Distorted Light Beam (reprise)"	3:23	Give Me the Future + Dreams of the Past	2022	
"Divide"	3:52	Doom Days	2019	
"Do They Know It's Christmas?" (as part of Band Aid 30) †	3:48	Non-album single	2014	
"Don't Let Go (Love)" (featuring Kianja, Craig David and Swarmz)	4:08	Other People's Heartache, Pt. 4	2018	En Vogue cover
"Doom Days" †	2:18	Doom Days	2019	
"Drawbridge & The Baroness"	3:41	"&"	2024	
"Dreams" (featuring Gabrielle Aplin)	4:19	Other People's Heartache, Pt. 2	2012	Fleetwood Mac cover Also released on Bad Blood X
"Durban Skies"	4:11	All This Bad Blood	2013	Single B-side
"Easy Days" (Demo)	2:53	Doom Days (This Got Out of Hand)	2019	
"Eight Hours" (featuring Tyde)	3:28	Give Me the Future + Dreams of the Past	2022	
"Emily & Her Penthouse In The Sky"	3:22	"&"	2024	
"Essie & Paul"	3:37	"&"	2024	
"Eurydice - Dan's Demo"	3:30	Kaos	2024	Recorded for the TV series 'Kaos'
"Eve & Paradise Lost"	3:13	"&"	2024	
"Fake It"	4:04	Wild World	2016	
"Family Ties"	2:46	Give Me the Future + Dreams of the Past	2022	
"Fall Into Your Arms" (featuring The Gemma Sharples Quartet)	1:49	VS. (Other People's Heartache, Pt. III)	2014	
"Falling" (featuring Ralph Pelleymounter)	3:45	Other People's Heartache	2012	Angelo Badalamenti and Julee Cruise cover
"Feel Alive" (with Illenium and Dabin) †	2:48	Odyssey	2026	
"Final Hour"	3:08	Doom Days (This Got Out of Hand)	2016	Wild World (Japan Edition and Target Exclusive); Made available to streaming platforms via Doom Days (TGOOH)
"Flaws" †	3:38	Bad Blood	2012	
"Flaws/Icarus" †	3:38/3:15	Non-album single	2011	Released as an independent single
"Flowers" (featuring Rationale and James Arthur)	3:46	Other People's Heartache, Pt. 4	2018	Sweet Female Attitude cover
"Forever Ever" (featuring Jay Brown and Kae Tempest)	3:42	Other People's Heartache, Pt. 2	2012	The Fugees and Enya cover
"Four Walls (The Ballad of Perry Smith)"	4:12	Wild World	2016	
"Free" (featuring Ella Eyre and Erika)	3:18	Other People's Heartache, Pt. 2	2012	Tina Turner and N-Trance cover
"Future Holds" (featuring Bim)	2:43	Give Me the Future	2022	
"Get Home"	3:11	Bad Blood	2013	
"Give Me The Future" †	3:39	Give Me the Future	2021	
"Glory" †	4:41	Wild World	2016	
"Glory (Single Version)" †	3:38	"Glory"	2017	
"Good Grief" †	3:26	Wild World	2016	
"Good Lesson"	3:30	Doom Days (This Got Out of Hand)	2019	
"Goosebumps" (featuring Kenny Beats)	2:47	Goosebumps EP	2020	
"Grip" (with Seeb) †	3:18	Other People's Heartache, Pt. 4	2018	First performed in 2015 as a song for Wild World
"Hangin'" ‡	3:29	Doom Days (This Got Out of Hand)	2015	Released as an independent single and vinyl exclusive in 2015; Made available to streaming platforms via Doom Days (TGOOH)
"Happier" (with Marshmello) †	3:34	Non-album single	2018	
"Haunt (Demo)"	2:53	All This Bad Blood	2013	Single B-side
"Head Down" (with Lost Frequencies) †	2:53	All Together Now	2023	
"Home Before The World Ends" (Will Varley featuring Bastille)	3:19	Machines Will Never Learn To Make Mistakes Like Me	2025	
"Hope For The Future"	3:32	Give Me the Future + Dreams of the Past	2022	
"I Know You" (Craig David featuring Bastille) †	3:36	The Time Is Now	2017	
"Icarus"	3:45	Bad Blood	2013	
"Intros & Narrators"	3:55	"&"	2024	
"Joy" †	3:11	Doom Days	2019	
"Killer" (featuring F*U*G*Z)	3:01	Other People's Heartache, Pt. 2	2012	Adamski, Seal, The BackStreet Boys and George Michael cover
"Killing Me Softly with His Song"	5:19	MTV Unplugged	2023	Roberta Flack cover
"La Lune" (Madeon featuring Dan Smith) *	3:39	Adventure	2015	
"Laughter Lines"	4:04	All This Bad Blood	2013	
"Laura Palmer" †	3:06	Bad Blood	2013	
"Lethargy"	3:24	Wild World	2016	
"Leonard & Marianne"	3:56	"&"	2024	
"Liar Liar" (Dylan featuring Bastille) †	2:54	Non-album single	2023	
"Love Don't Live Here" (featuring Rory Andrew, Jonas Jalhay and F.Stokes)	6:02	Other People's Heartache	2012	Rose Royce cover
"Mademoiselle & The Nunnery Blaze"	3:59	"&"	2024	
"Marie & Polonium"	3:22	"&"	2024	
"Merry Xmas Everybody" ‡	3:15	Non-album single	2020	Slade cover Recorded for Nest Audio Sessions
"Million Pieces"	4:11	Doom Days	2019	
"Million Pieces" (featuring the Chamber Orchestra of London)	4:43	Doom Days (This Got Out of Hand)	2019	
"My Head & The Glass"	3:44	"&", Part Four	2025	
"No Angels" (featuring Ella Eyre)	4:00	Other People's Heartache, Pt. 2	2012	TLC and The xx cover
"No Angels" (featuring Ella Eyre)	3:52	Bad Blood X	2023	TLC and The xx cover
"No Bad Days" †	3:05	Give Me the Future	2021	
"No More Bad Days"	3:59	Give Me the Future + Dreams of the Past	2022	
"No One's Here to Sleep" (Naughty Boy featuring Bastille)	3:25	Hotel Cabana	2013	
"Nocturnal Creatures"	3:52	Doom Days	2019	
"Oblivion" †	3:16	Bad Blood	2013	
"Of the Night" †	3:34	Other People's Heartache; All This Bad Blood	2012	Corona and Snap! cover
"Oh Holy Night"	2:16	Other People's Heartache, Pt. 2	2012	Adolphe Adam cover
"Oil On Water"	2:58	Wild World (Complete Edition)	2016	
"Other People's Heartache (interlude)"	0:45	Give Me the Future + Dreams of the Past	2022	
"Overjoyed" †	3:26	Bad Blood	2012	
"Overload" ‡	3:43	Non-album single	2015	Released as an independent single and vinyl exclusive in 2015; Sugababes cover Recorded for the film 'Kill Your Friends'
"Plug In..."	2:40	Give Me the Future	2022	
"Poet"	2:44	All This Bad Blood	2013	Single B-side
"Pompeii" †	3:34	Bad Blood	2013	
"Pompeii/Waiting All Night" (with Rudimental featuring Ella Eyre)	5:56	Bad Blood	2014	2014 Brit Awards duet was released digitally
"Power"	3:29	Wild World	2016	
"Previously on Other People's Heartache..."	1:06	All This Bad Blood	2013	
"Promises" (with Riz Ahmed)	1:25	Give Me the Future	2022	
"Quarter Past Midnight" †	3:19	Doom Days	2018	
"Real Life"	2:20	Give Me the Future (Deluxe Edition)	2022	
"Red Wine & Wilde"	3:41	"&"	2024	
"Remains" (featuring Rag'n'Bone Man and Skunk Anansie)	4:40	VS. (Other People's Heartache, Pt. III)	2014	
"Remind Me" †	3:02	Give Me the Future + Dreams of the Past	2022	
"Requiem for Blue Jeans"	3:57	Other People's Heartache	2012	Clint Mansell, Kronos Quartet and Lana Del Rey cover
"Revolution" †	3:03	Give Me the Future + Dreams of the Past	2022	
"Run Into Trouble" (with Alok) †	3:02	Give Me the Future + Dreams of the Past	2022	
"Running Away"	2:52	Give Me the Future + Dreams of the Past	2022	
"Save My Soul"	3:57	Non-album single	2025	
"Seasons & Narcissus"	3:29	"&"	2024	
"Send Them Off!" †	3:20	Wild World	2016	
"Shame"	3:30	Wild World (Complete Edition)	2016	
"Shut Off the Lights" †	3:07	Give Me the Future	2022	
"Skulls"	4:11	All This Bad Blood	2013	
"Sleepsong"	3:40	All This Bad Blood	2013	Single B-side
"Snakes"	3:17	Wild World	2016	
"Spiralling" (To Kill a King featuring Bastille)	3:46	TBA	2025	
"Stay Awake?"	3:07	Give Me the Future	2022	
"Survivin'" †	2:53	Goosebumps EP	2020	
"Sweet Pompeii"	2:32	Other People's Heartache, Pt. 2	2012	Calvin Harris and Thomas Newman cover
"Telegraph Road 1977 & 2024"	4:07	"&"	2024	
"The Anchor"	3:24	Wild World (Complete Edition)	2016	
"The Answer" (with Energies, Joywave and Rittipo)	3:23	Non-album single	2025	
"The Currents"	3:24	Wild World	2016	
"The Descent"	3:18	"Send Them Off!"	2016	Single B-side
"The Descent" (featuring Lily Moore, Moss Kena and Jacob Banks)	5:42	Other People's Heartache, Pt. 4	2018	
"The Draw"	3:14	All This Bad Blood	2013	
"The Driver"	4:22	VS. (Other People's Heartache, Pt. III)	2014	
"The Soprano & Midnight Wonderings" (featuring Bim)	3:40	"&"	2024	
"The Silence"	3:51	All This Bad Blood	2013	
"The Waves"	4:00	Doom Days	2019	
"Thelma + Louise" †	2:17	Give Me the Future	2021	
"These Streets"	2:55	Bad Blood	2013	
"Things We Lost in the Fire" †	4:01	Bad Blood	2013	
"Thinkin' Ahead" (featuring O.N.E. and Ric Elsworth)	4:03	Other People's Heartache, Pt. 2	2012	Frank Ocean and Hans Zimmer cover
"Thinkin' Bout You" (featuring O.N.E.)	3:05	"Laura Palmer"	2013	Frank Ocean and Hans Zimmer cover Single B-side
"Those Nights" †	4:30	Doom Days	2019	
"Times Like These" (as part of Live Lounge Allstars) †	4:16	Non-album single	2020	
"Titanium"	2:54	Other People's Heartache	2012	David Guetta and Sia cover
"Torn Apart" (featuring GRADES) †	3:06	VS. (Other People's Heartache, Pt. III)	2014	
"Torn Apart, Pt. II" (featuring GRADES and Lizzo)	1:02	VS. (Other People's Heartache, Pt. III)	2014	
"Total Dissociation" (Interlude)	0:43	Give Me the Future	2022	
"Tuning In" (featuring HUMS Contemporary Choir)	1:02	Other People's Heartache, Pt. 2	2012	
"Tuning Out..."	2:36	All This Bad Blood	2013	
"Two Evils"	2:46	Wild World	2016	
"Walk to Oblivion" (featuring Ralph Pelleymounter)	2:21	Other People's Heartache, Pt. 2	2012	
"Warmth"	3:49	Wild World	2016	
"Warmth (Live from Elbphilharmonie, Hamburg)" ‡	4:04	Non-album single	2021	Released as an Amazon original with their documentary ReOrchestrated
"Warmth (Outro)" (featuring Moss Kena)	1:06	Other People's Heartache, Pt. 4	2018	
"Way Beyond"	3:19	Wild World (Complete Edition)	2016	
"We Can't Stop"	3:38	BBC Radio 1's Live Lounge 2014	2014	Miley Cyrus, Eminem, Elton John and Billy Ray Cyrus cover
"Weapon" (featuring Angel Haze, F*U*G*Z and Braque)	4:48	VS. (Other People's Heartache, Pt. III)	2014	
"Weight of Living, Pt. I"	3:26	Bad Blood	2013	Hidden track on Bad Blood
"Weight of Living, Pt. II"	2:55	Bad Blood	2013	
"What's In A Name?" (Future Utopia featuring Dan Smith of Bastille) *	4:54	12 Questions	2020	
"What Would You Do?"	3:03	All This Bad Blood	2013	City High cover
"What Would You Do?"	3:22	Other People's Heartache	2012	City High cover
"What You Gonna Do???" (featuring Graham Coxon) †	2:11	Goosebumps EP	2020	
"When I Watch the World Burn All I Think About Is You" (Demo)	3:12	Doom Days (This Got Out of Hand)	2019	
"Wild World (Intro)" (featuring Kianja)	2:03	Other People's Heartache, Pt. 4	2018	Cat Stevens cover
"Winter of Our Youth"	3:23	Wild World	2016	
"Won't Let You Go" (Frenship featuring Bastille)	3:57	Vacation	2019	
"World Gone Mad" †	3:16	Bright	2017	Part of the soundtrack for the film Bright
"Would I Lie to You?" (featuring Kianja, S-X and Craig David)	3:55	Other People's Heartache, Pt. 4	2018	Charles & Eddie cover
"Zheng Yi Sao & Questions For Her"	3:34	"&"	2024	

== Covers ==
This is a list non-album covers by Bastille.

Song	Year	Recorded	Original Artist(s)	Ref.
"2000 Miles/Feliz Navidad"	2020	Absolute Radio	José Feliciano and The Pretenders	
"All I Want for Christmas"	2016	BBC Radio 1's Piano Sessions	Mariah Carey, R. Kelly and 2Pac	
"Anyone But Me/Nightmares"	2020	Barclaycard Share The Stage	Joy Crookes and Easy Life	
"Bad Guy"	2019	BBC Radio 1's Live Lounge	Billie Eilish, Dick Dale, Lady Gaga and Taylor Swift	
"Christmas Mashup"	2013	BBC Radio 1's Live Lounge	The Darkness, East 17, Wham!, Chris Rea, Mariah Carey and South Park	
"Diamonds and Waste"	2011	Youtube	Kate McGill	
"Dreams (Mash-up)"	2021	Virgin Radio UK	The Human League, Eurythmics, Beyoncé, Aerosmith, Vangelis, Blondie, The Undertones, Hall & Oates, Roy Orbison and D:Ream	
"Drop It Like It's Royal Mashup"	2017	BBC Radio 1's Live Lounge	Snoop Dogg, Lorde, Rihanna, Florence and the Machine and Katy Perry	
"Earth Song/Common People"	2014	BBC Radio 1's Live Lounge	Michael Jackson and Pulp	
"Eastside"	2018	BBC Radio 1's Live Lounge	Benny Blanco, Khalid, Halsey, Nelly and Kanye West	
"Human/Don't You Want Me"	2017	BBC Radio 2	Rag'n'Bone Man and The Human League	
"I Don't Want to Miss a Thing/It's the End of the World as We Know It"	2017	BBC Radio 2	Aerosmith and R.E.M.	
"I Will Survive/Survivor"	2020	Virgin Radio UK	Gloria Gaynor and Destiny's Child	
"Killing Me Softly with His Song"	2021	MTV Unplugged	Lori Lieberman	
"Locked Out of Heaven Mashup"	2013	BBC Radio 1's Live Lounge	Bruno Mars, Rihanna and The xx	
"Old Town Road Mashup"	2019	BBC Radio 1's Live Lounge	Lil Nas X, Lizzo, Radiohead, Talking Heads and The Osmonds	
"Say My Name Mashup"	2018	BBC Radio 2	Destiny's Child, Christina Aguilera, Justin Timberlake, Fatboy Slim and Dr dre	
"Someone You Loved Mashup"	2019	SiriusXM	Lewis Capaldi, Adele, Kings of Leon, Queen and The Killers	
"This Is What You Came For Mashup"	2016	1LIVE Session	Calvin Harris, Rihanna, Taylor Swift and Nancy Sinatra	
"Time Mashup"	2021	BBC Radio 2	Hans Zimmer, Madonna, Cyndi Lauper, The National, Cher, Pink Floyd and Muse	
