= List of awards and nominations received by Bastille =

Bastille awards and nominations
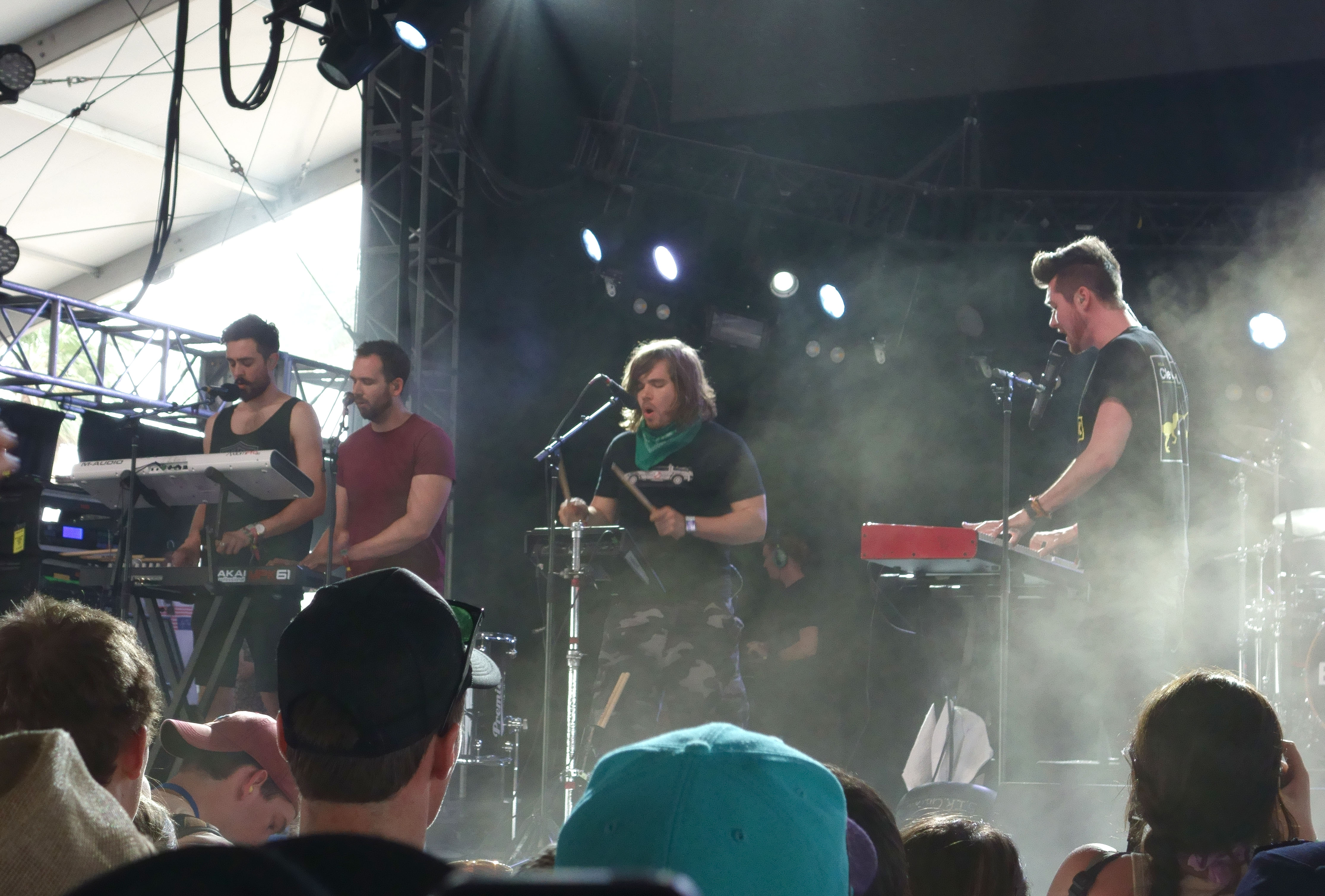
- Bastille performing at Coachella in 2014
Awards and nominations
Award	Wins	Nominations
American Music Awards	0	3
APRA Awards	0	2
ASCAP Awards	6	0
Billboard Music Awards	0	5
BMI Awards	2	0
Brit Awards	1	5
ECHO Music Awards	0	1
Grammy Awards	0	1
iHeartRadio Music Awards	0	4
International Dance Music Awards	1	1
JIMtv Jimmie Awards	1	2
MTV Europe Music Awards	0	2
MTV Video Music Awards	0	1
mtvU Woodie Awards	1	1
NewNowNext Awards	0	1
Nickelodeon Kids' Choice Awards	0	1
NME Awards	2	5
Q Awards	1	1
Radio X Awards	0	1
Teen Choice Awards	1	2
UK Music Video Awards	1	2
Webby Awards	1	0
World Music Awards	0	7

Totals (Note: Certain award groups do not simply award one winner. They acknowledge several different recipients, have runners-up, and have third place. Since this is a specific recognition and is different from losing an award, runner-up mentions are considered wins in this award tally. For simplification and to avoid errors, each award in this list has been presumed to have had a prior nomination.)
- Wins: 18
- Nominations: 48

Bastille (stylised as BΔSTILLE) are a British rock band formed in London in 2010. They began as a solo project by singer-songwriter Dan Smith, who later decided to form a band. The four-piece is completed by Chris 'Woody' Wood, William Farquarson, and Kyle Simmons. The name of the band derives from Bastille Day – an event celebrated on Smith's birthday, 14 July.

In December 2010, EMI Music announced that they had offered Bastille a record contract with Virgin Records. Their debut single, "Overjoyed" was subsequently released in April 2012. Their first studio album, titled Bad Blood, was released in March 2013 and debuted atop the UK Albums Chart. The band was nominated for four Brit Awards at the 2014 ceremony, including for British Breakthrough Act, British Group, British Single of the Year and British Album of the Year, winning for British Breakthrough Act. As of November 2014, Bastille have sold over 5 million records in the US and 2.5 million records in the UK alone.

== American Music Awards ==
The American Music Awards is an annually held awards ceremony for outstanding achievements for American artists in the record industry, which airs on ABC. Bastille has received no awards from three nominations.

Year	Nominee / work	Award	Result
2014	Bastille	New Artist of the Year	Nominated
2014	Bastille	Favorite Alternative Artist	Nominated
2019	"Happier"	Collaboration of the Year	Nominated

== APRA Music Awards ==
The APRA Music Awards are several award ceremonies run in Australia by Australasian Performing Right Association to recognise songwriting skills, sales and airplay performance by its members annually. Bastille has received no awards from two nominations.

Year	Nominee / work	Award	Result
2014	"Pompeii"	Most Performed International Work	Nominated
2020	"Happier"	Most Performed International Work	Nominated

== ASCAP Awards ==
=== ASCAP POP Awards ===
The annual ASCAP Pop Awards are held by the American Society of Composers, Authors and Publishers to honour the songwriters and publishers of the most performed pop songs.

Year	Nominee / work	Award	Result
2019	"Happier"	Most Performed Songs	Won
2020	"Happier"	Most Performed Songs	Won

=== ASCAP London Music Awards ===
Year	Nominee / work	Award	Result
2020	"Happier"	Song of the Year	Won
2020	"Happier"	Top EDM Song	Won
2020	"Happier"	Top Streaming Song	Won
2021	"Happier"	Hot Dance/Electronic Song	Won

== Berlin Music Video Awards ==
The Berlin Music Video Awards is an international festival that promotes the art of music videos.

Year	Nominee / work	Award	Result
2022	THELMA & LOUISE	Best Animation	Nominated

== Billboard Music Awards ==
The Billboard Music Awards is an annual awards show from Billboard Magazine. Bastille has received no awards from five nominations.

Year	Nominee / work	Award	Result
2014	Bastille	New Artist of the Year	Nominated
2015	Bastille	Top Rock Artist	Nominated
2015	"Pompeii"	Top Rock Song	Nominated
2019	"Happier"	Top Collaboration	Nominated
2019	"Happier"	Top Dance/Electronic Song	Nominated

== BMI Awards ==
The BMI Awards are annual award ceremonies for songwriters in various genres organised by Broadcast Music, Inc.

=== BMI London Awards ===
Year	Nominee / work	Award	Result
2017	"Good Grief"	Pop Award	Won

=== BMI Pop Awards ===
Year	Nominee / work	Award	Result
2020	"Happier"	Award Winning Songs	Won

== Brit Awards ==
The Brit Awards are the British Phonographic Industry's annual pop music awards. Bastille has received one award from six nominations.

Year	Nominee / work	Award	Result
2014	Bastille	Best New Artist	Won
2014	Bastille	British Group	Nominated
2014	"Bad Blood"	Best British Album	Nominated
2014	"Pompeii"	Song of the Year	Nominated
2017	Bastille	British Group	Nominated
2020	Bastille	British Group	Nominated

== ECHO Awards ==
The ECHO Awards is an annual awards ceremony presented by the Deutsche Phono-Akademie, an association of recording companies of Germany, to recognize outstanding achievement in the music industry.

Year	Nominee / work	Award	Result
2014	"Bad Blood"	International Band of the Year	Nominated

== Grammy Awards ==
The Grammy Awards is an annual music awards show held by the National Academy of Recording Arts and Sciences of the United States for outstanding achievements in the record industry. Bastille has been nominated for an award in 2015 Grammy Awards.

Year	Nominee / work	Award	Result
2015	Bastille	Best New Artist	Nominated

== iHeart Radio Music Awards ==
iHeartRadio Music Awards is an inaugural music award show presented by Clear Channel Communications's platform iHeartRadio and NBC. Bastille has received no awards from two nominations.

Year	Nominee / work	Award	Result
2014	"Pompeii"	Alt Rock Song of the Year	Nominated
2015	Bastille	Best New Artist	Nominated
2019	"Happier" (with Marshmello)	Alternative Rock Song of the Year	Nominated
2019	"Happier" (with Marshmello)	Dance Song of the Year	Nominated

== International Dance Music Awards ==
The International Dance Music Awards, established in 1985, are an annual awards show honoring dance and electronic artists. It is a part of the Winter Music Conference, a weeklong electronic music event held annually.

Year	Nominee / work	Award	Result
2014	"Pompeii"	Best Alternative/Indie Rock Dance Track	Nominated
2019	"Happier"	Best Pop/Electronic Song	Won

== JIMtv Jimmie Awards ==
JIMtv Jimmie Awards is a Flemish award show hosted by the JIM television channel. Bastille has received one award from three nominations.

Year	Nominee / work	Award	Result
2014	Bastille	International Breakthrough	Won
2014	Bastille	Band International	Nominated
2014	Bad Blood	Album International	Nominated

== Nickelodeon Kids' Choice Awards ==
The Nickelodeon Kids' Choice Awards, also known as the KCAs or Kids Choice Awards, is an annual awards show that airs on the Nickelodeon cable channel, which is usually held on a Saturday night in late March or early April, that honors the year's biggest television, movie, and music acts, as voted by Nickelodeon viewers.

Year	Nominee / work	Award	Result
2019	"Happier" (ft. Marshmello)	Favorite Collaboration	Nominated

== MTV Awards ==
=== MTV Video Music Awards ===
The MTV Video Music Awards, established in 1985, are an annual awards show honoring the best in the music video medium.

Year	Nominee / work	Award	Result
2019	"Happier"	Best Dance Video	Nominated

=== MTV Europe Music Awards ===
The MTV Europe Music Awards is an annual awards ceremony established in 1994 by MTV Europe for the best in European music. Bastille has received no awards from two nominations.

Year	Nominee / work	Award	Result
2013	Bastille	Best Push Act	Nominated
2013	Bastille	Best New Act	Nominated

=== mtvU Woodie Awards ===
MTVU broadcasts its own semi-annual awards show, the Woodie Awards, which it states recognizes "the music voted best by college students". Bastille has received one award from two nominations.

Year	Nominee / work	Award	Result
2014	Bastille	Breaking Woodie	Nominated
2014	Cover of Miley Cyrus' "We Can't Stop"	Best Cover Woodie	Won

== NewNowNext Awards ==
The NewNowNext-Awards is an American annual entertainment awards show, presented by the lesbian, gay, bisexual and transgender-themed channel Logo. Launched in 2008, awards are presented both for LGBT-specific and general interest achievements in entertainment and pop culture. Bastille have received no awards from one nomination.

Year	Nominee / work	Award	Result
2014	Bastille	Best New Music Group	Nominated

== NME Awards ==
The NME Awards is an annual music awards show in the United Kingdom, presented by the music magazine, NME. Founded in 1953, the awards are presented in music categories that have varied slightly over the years. Bastille have received two awards from seven nominations.

Year	Nominee / work	Award	Result
2015	Bastille	Worst Band	Nominated
2017	Bastille	Best British Band	Nominated
2017	Bastille	Best Live Band	Nominated
2017	"Wild World"	Best Album	Won
2017	"Good Grief"	Best Track	Nominated
2018	Bastille	Best British Band	Nominated
2018	I Know You ft. Craig David	Best Collaboration	Won

== Q Awards ==
The Q Awards are hosted annually by the music magazine Q. Bastille has won one award from two nominations.

Year	Nominee / work	Award	Result
2016	"Wild World"	Best Album	Nominated
2016	"Good Grief"	Best Track	Won

== Radio X Awards ==
The Radio X awards are from a listener vote from songs compiled from over the year that have been played on the station.

Year	Nominee / work	Award	Result
2020	"What You Gonna Do???"	Record of the Year	Nominated

== Teen Choice Awards ==
The Teen Choice Awards is an annual awards show that airs on the Fox Network. Bastille has received one award from one nomination.

Year	Nominee / work	Award	Result
2014	"Pompeii"	Choice Rock Song	Won
2019	"Joy"	Choice Rock Song	Nominated
2019	"Happier"	Choice Electronic/Dance Song	Nominated

== UK Music Video Awards ==
The UK Music Video Awards is an annual celebration of creativity, technical excellence and innovation in music video and moving image for music. Bastille have won one award from three nominations.

Year	Nominee / work	Award	Result
2013	"Things We Lost In The Fire"	Best Colour Grade in a Video	Nominated
2015	"Torn Apart"	Best Rock/Indie Video – UK	Nominated
2021	"Distorted Light Beam"	Best Colour Grading in a Video	Won

== Webby Awards ==
The Webby Awards are awards for excellence on the Internet presented annually by The International Academy of Digital Arts and Sciences, a judging body composed of over two thousand industry experts and technology innovators.

Year	Nominee / work	Award	Result
2020	"Doom Days Web AR"	Music	Won

== World Music Awards ==
The World Music Awards is an international awards ceremony that annually honors recording artists based on worldwide sales figures provided by the International Federation of the Phonographic Industry. Bastille has received no awards from seven nominations.

Year	Nominee / work	Award	Result
2014	Bastille	Best Group	Nominated
2014	Bastille	Best Live Act	Nominated
2014	Bad Blood	Best Album	Nominated
2014	"Pompeii"	Best Song	Nominated
2014	"Pompeii"	Best Video	Nominated
2014	"Of the Night"	Best Song	Nominated
2014	"Of the Night"	Best Video	Nominated
