= Blame (disambiguation) =

Blame is censuring or holding responsible for an individual or group.

Blame may also refer to:

== Songs ==
- "Blame" (Autumn Hill song), 2015
- "Blame" (Bastille song), 2016
- "Blame" (Calvin Harris song), 2014 song featuring John Newman
- "Blame" (Collective Soul song), 1997
- "Blame", a song by Bastille from Wild World
- "Blame", a song by Cavo from Bright Nights Dark Days, 2009
- "Blame", a song by Melanie C from Version of Me
- "Blame", a song by KoRn from Untouchables
- "Blame", a song by Soul Coughing from El Oso

== Film ==
- Blame (2010 film), an Australian film
- Blame (2017 film), an American film
- Blame (2025 film), a Swiss documentary film
- Blame! (film), a 2017 anime film based on the manga by Tsutomu Nihei

== Other uses ==
- Blame!, a Japanese manga series by Tsutomu Nihei
- Blame (horse), a racehorse
- Blame (music producer), British music producer and DJ
- Blame, a term in version control for finding the author of a revision

== See also ==
- - The Blame
- Wikipedia:WikiBlame, a tool for searching the revision history of a MediaWiki-based wiki
