= Oblivion (Bastille song) =

2014 single by Bastille

Single by Bastille

from the album Bad Blood
- B-side: "Bad News"
- Released: 5 September 2014
- Recorded: 2012
- Length: 3:16
- Label: Virgin
- Songwriter: Dan Smith
- Producers: Mark Crew; Dan Smith

Bastille singles chronology
"Pompeii/Waiting All Night" (2014)	"Oblivion" (2014)	"Torn Apart" (2014)

Music video
- "Bastille - Oblivion (Official Music Video)" on YouTube

"Oblivion" is a song by British band Bastille from their 2013 album Bad Blood. It was released digitally in the UK on 5 September 2014 as the seventh and final single from the album. A limited edition 7-inch vinyl edition of the single, featuring the previously unreleased track "Bad News" as the B-side, was also released on 8 September.

The song was featured on an episode of the television series The Vampire Diaries in 2012.

== Release ==
The band confirmed during their headline set at London's Somerset House on 15 July that "Oblivion" will be the next single from Bad Blood.

== Music video ==
The music video was exclusively premiered on MSN Music UK on Monday 21 July. It was later published through Bastille's Vevo channel on YouTube the same day. The video was directed by Austin Peters (who previously directed the band's "Flaws" and "Laura Palmer" music videos) and stars actress Sophie Turner (known for her role in the television series Game of Thrones). She is seen lip-syncing to the lyrics of the song, singing in front of a crowd of people at a demolition derby.

== Live performances ==
The song made its first appearance in September 2012, when it was first performed at iTunes Festival in London.

Bastille made a live recording of the song at Capitol Studios. Rolling Stone premiered the video on 21 November 2013. This live version was used as a B-side track to the single "Of the Night".

They also performed the song live on the 25 January 2014 airing of Saturday Night Live.

== In popular media ==
The song was featured in "O Come, All Ye Faithful", the ninth episode of the fourth season of The Vampire Diaries.

== Track listing ==
Digital download - EP
No.	Title	Length
1.	"Oblivion"	03:17
2.	"Bad News"	04:39
3.	"Pompeii" (Live with Film Orchestra)	03:36
4.	"Bad Blood" (Live Piano Version)	03:28
5.	"Oblivion" (Slinger Remix)	05:22
6.	"bad_news" (Instrumental)	04:39
7.	"Oblivion" (video)	04:10

Limited edition 7" vinyl
No.	Title	Length
1.	"Oblivion"
2.	"bad_news"

== Charts ==
Chart (2014)	Peak position
Scotland Singles (OCC)	69
UK Singles (OCC)	82

== Certifications ==
Region	Certification	Certified units/sales
New Zealand (RMNZ)	Gold	15,000^{‡}
United Kingdom (BPI)	Silver	200,000^{‡}
^{‡} Sales+streaming figures based on certification alone.

== Personnel ==
Credits adapted from Bad Blood.

- Dan Smith – vocals, piano, songwriting, production, string arrangements
- Mark Crew – production, string arrangements
- Verity Evanson – cello, string arrangements
