= Laura Palmer EP =

EP by Bastille
- Released: 14 November 2011
- Recorded: 2011
- Genre: Indie pop
- Length: 13:37
- Label: Self-released

Bastille chronology
Laura Palmer EP (2011)	Other People's Heartache (2012)

Laura Palmer EP is the debut EP by English indie pop band Bastille, self-released in November 2011 as a digital download and on CD. It features four of Bastille's earliest songs, which were later included on their debut album Bad Blood. It followed their debut single "Flaws" / "Icarus", which was released on 4 July 2011.

== Track listing ==
All songs written and composed by Dan Smith

No.	Title	Length
1.	"Laura Palmer"	3:02
2.	"Overjoyed"	3:24
3.	"Things We Lost in the Fire"	4:03
4.	"Get Home"	3:08
Total length:		13:37
