= Haunt (EP) =

EP by Bastille
- Released: 28 May 2013
- Genres: Indie rock; indie pop
- Length: 13:24
- Label: Virgin

Bastille chronology
Bad Blood (2013)	Haunt (2013)	VS. (Other People's Heartache, Pt. III) (2014)

Haunt is an EP by English indie pop band Bastille. It was released exclusively in the United States in May 2013 digitally and in July 2013 physically. It features three songs from their debut album Bad Blood. It also features a demo track, the title track of the EP, that was originally the B-side to the "Bad Blood" single. The EP peaked at number 104 on the Billboard 200 and number one on the Top Heatseekers chart.

== Track listing ==
All songs written and composed by Dan Smith

No.	Title	Length
1.	"Pompeii"	3:34
2.	"Overjoyed"	3:26
3.	"Bad Blood"	3:33
4.	"Haunt"	2:51
Total length:		13:24

== Charts ==
Chart performance for Haunt
Chart (2013)	Peak position
US Billboard 200	104
US Top Alternative Albums (Billboard)	21
US Top Rock Albums (Billboard)	29
