= The Blame =

The Blame may refer to:

- The Blame (film) (Die Schuld), the 1924 German silent film directed by Josef Berger
- The Blame (TV series), a 2026 British crime drama released on ITVX
- "The Blame", the 34th episode of The Amazing World of Gumball season 4
- "The Blame", a song from Bing Bang Boom, the 1991 album by Highway 101

== See also ==
- Blame (disambiguation)
- The Blame Game
- The Blamed, the American Christian hardcore punk band
