= Final Hour =

Final Hour may refer to:

- "Final Hour", a 2016 song by Bastille from Wild World
- "Final Hour", a 1998 song by Lauryn Hill from The Miseducation of Lauryn Hill
- Tiempo final, a 2007-2009 Colombian television series
