= Meadowlark (band) =

British indie pop duo

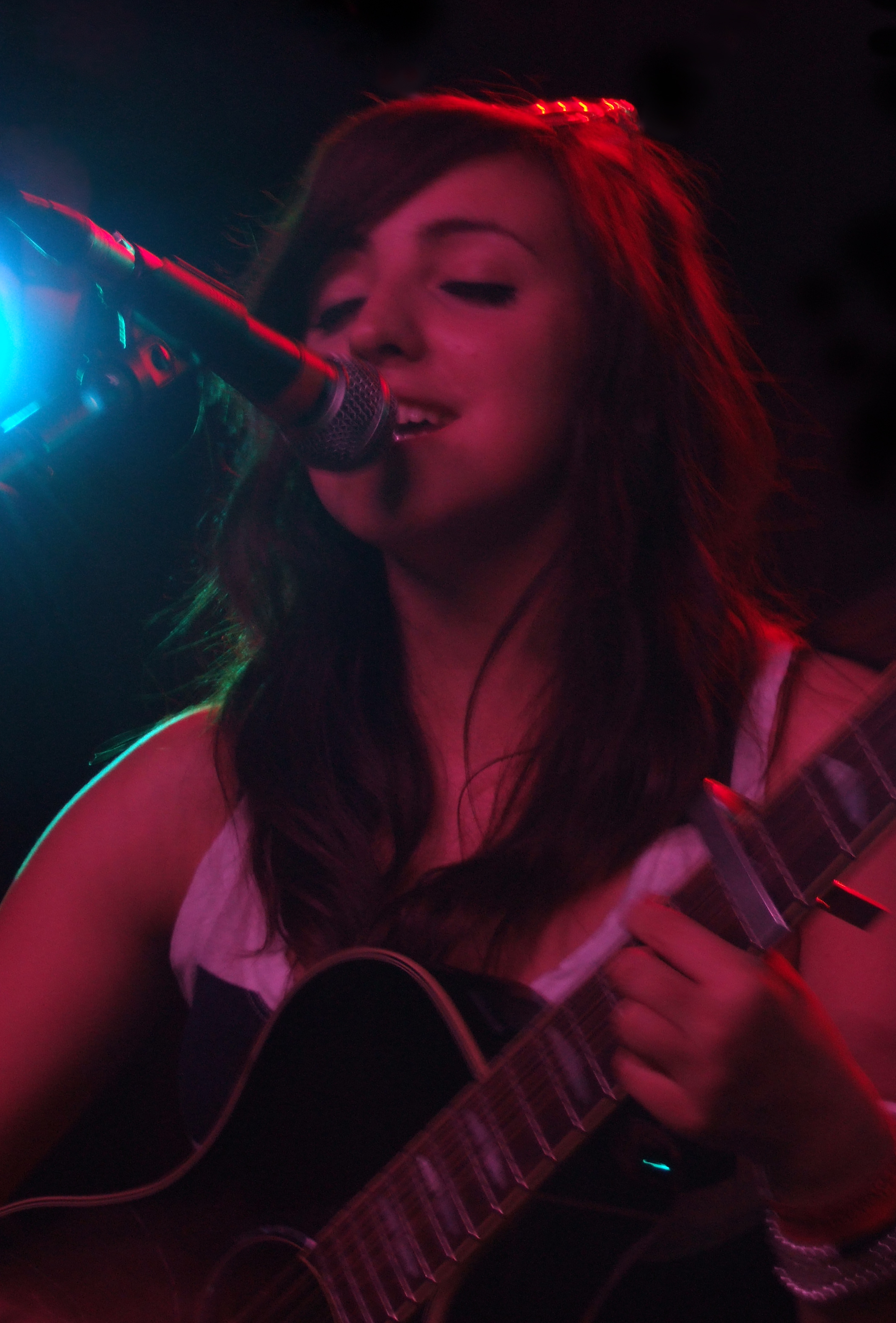
- Kate McGill in 2010

Background information
- Origin: Plymouth, England
- Genres: Indie pop
- Years active: 2013—present
- Members: Kate McGill; Daniel Broadley
- Past members: Carl Jones

Meadowlark are a British indie pop duo composed of Kate McGill and Daniel Broadley.

== Career ==
Meadowlark were initially a trio made up of McGill, Broadley, and Carl Jones. McGill, who had until that point been known for her covers of popular songs, which she posted on her YouTube channel, announced the formation of the band on 22 March 2013. On the same day, they released a live version of a track titled "Family Tree", which focuses on Kate's home life. Meadowlark released their first EP, Three Six Five, on 26 May 2014. In September of that year, it was announced on social media that Carl Jones would no longer be part of the band, signifying a fresh start. Kate and Daniel released their first EP as a duo, named Dual, on 30 March 2015. Their single "Eyes Wide" gained popularity through the radio show BBC Music Introducing, and they performed at Glastonbury Festival on the BBC Introducing stage later that year. In 2016, Meadowlark released the Paraffin EP, followed by two singles, "Quicksand" and "Headlights".

Meadowlark's debut album, Postcards, came out on 30 June 2017.

On 26 November 2021, the duo released their sophomore album, titled Nightstorm.

On 3 February 2023, Meadowlark released the single "Full Me, Half You". On 10 March 2023, the single "What's It Like to Love Me" came out. On 22 March 2023, the band posted on their Twitter account that their third studio album, Hiraeth, would be released on 6 October 2023. On 13 April 2023, it was announced that Meadowlark would be supporting English singer-songwriter Sivu on his headline show at the Courtyard Theatre, London in June 2023; the show would be Meadowlark's first live performance in five years. However, on 12 June 2023, McGill tested positive for COVID-19, so the band was replaced by Badhead Hyland and Bea Stewart as support acts. The song "I Want Love (Like I Give My Love)" was released on 14 April 2023. The band's next single, "Brainwashed", followed on 19 May 2023.

== Discography ==
=== Studio albums ===
List of studio albums, with selected details
Title	Details
Postcards	Released: 30 June 2017; Label: Allpoints; Format: Digital download, streaming
Nightstorm	Released: 26 November 2021; Label: Fries Boom Barrier; Format: Digital download, streaming
Hiraeth	Released: 6 October 2023; Label: Fieldfare Records; Format: Digital download, streaming

=== EPs ===
List of EPs, with selected details
Title	Details
Three Six Five	Released: 2014; Label: Format: Digital download
Dual	Released: 2015; Label: Format: Digital download
Dual (Remixes)	Released: 2015; Label: Format: Digital download
Paraffin	Released: 2016; Label: Format: Digital download
Nocturnes	Released: 2017; Label: Format: Digital download
Sunlight	Released: 2017; Label: Format: Digital download
H.I.T.H (Remixes)	Released: 2019; Label: Format: Digital download

=== Singles ===
List of singles as lead artist, showing year released and originating album
Title	Year	Album
"Family Tree"	2013	Three Six Five
"Eyes Wide"	2015	Dual
"Quicksand"	2016	Non-album single
"Headlights"	2016	Postcards
"May I Have This Dance"	2017	Sunlight
"Pink Heart"	2018	Postcards
"Appetite"	2018	Nightstorm
"H.I.T.H."	2019	Nightstorm
"Still Into You"	2019	Non-album single
"Halo"	2020	Nightstorm
"Lightning"	2020	Nightstorm
"My Light Has Gone"	2021	Nightstorm
"Nightstorm"	2021	Nightstorm
"Like a Knife"	2021	Nightstorm
"Disposable"	2021	Nightstorm
"Oxygen"	2022	Nightstorm
"Goodbye"	2022	Non-album singles
"Full Me, Half You"	2023	Non-album singles
"What's It Like to Love Me"	2023	Non-album singles
"I Want Love (Like I Give My Love)"	2023	Non-album singles
"Brainwashed"	2023	Non-album singles
"Borrowed"	2023	Non-album singles
