= Blame Game (disambiguation) =

"Blame Game" is a 2010 song by Kanye West.

Blame Game or The Blame Game may also refer to:

== Music ==
- Blame Game (EP), by Beach Bunny, 2021
  - "Blame Game", a track on the EP
- "Blame Game", a song by the Von Bondies from their 2009 album Love, Hate and Then There's You

== Television ==
- The Blame Game (British TV programme), 2005
- The Blame Game (American game show), 1999
- "The Blame Game" (Ally McBeal), a 1998 episode
- "Blame Game" (Dallas), a 2013 episode

== See also ==
- Buck passing, or (playing) the blame game, the act of attributing to another person or group one's own responsibility
