= Bad Blood (Bastille song) =

Single by Bastille

from the album Bad Blood
- B-side: "Haunt" (Demo)
- Released: 19 August 2012
- Recorded: 2012
- Genre: Indie pop; synth-pop; reggae fusion
- Length: 3:33
- Label: Virgin
- Songwriter: Dan Smith
- Producers: Dan Smith, Mark Crew

Bastille singles chronology
"Overjoyed" (2012)	"Bad Blood" (2012)	"Flaws" (2012)

Music video
- "Bastille - Bad Blood (Official Music Video)" on YouTube

"Bad Blood" is a song by British band Bastille and the second single from their debut studio album of the same name. It was released as a single in the United Kingdom on 19 August 2012. Both "Bad Blood" and its B-side track "Haunt (Demo)" were included on their 2013 Haunt EP, along with "Pompeii" and "Overjoyed".

== Music video ==
A music video to accompany the release of "Bad Blood" was first released onto YouTube on 29 June 2012 at a total length of three minutes and thirty-four seconds. The video was directed by Olivier Groulx and features model Betty Jacobsson.

== Track listing ==
Digital download

1. "Bad Blood" – 3:32
2. "Haunt" (Demo) – 2:53
3. "Bad Blood" (F*U*G*Z Remix) (featuring F.Stokes and Kenzie May) – 3:41
4. "Bad Blood" (Mele Remix) – 4:21
5. "Bad Blood" (Lunice Remix) – 3:53
6. "Bad Blood" (music video) – 3:47

== Charts ==
=== Weekly charts ===
Chart (2012–15)	Peak position
Belgium (Ultratip Bubbling Under Flanders)	5
Canada Rock (Billboard)	14
Slovenia (SloTop50)	41
Switzerland Airplay (Schweizer Hitparade)	95
UK Singles (OCC)	90
US Billboard Hot 100	95
US Dance Club Songs (Billboard)	4
US Hot Rock & Alternative Songs (Billboard)	15
US Rock & Alternative Airplay (Billboard)	4

=== Year-end charts ===
Chart (2014)	Position
US Hot Rock Songs (Billboard)	28
US Rock Airplay (Billboard)	8

== Certifications ==
Region	Certification	Certified units/sales
United Kingdom (BPI)	Silver	200,000^{‡}
United States (RIAA)	Gold	500,000^{‡}
^{‡} Sales+streaming figures based on certification alone.

== Release history ==
Region	Date	Format	Label
United Kingdom	19 August 2012	Digital download	Virgin Records
United Kingdom	20 August 2012	7" vinyl	Virgin Records
United States	28 January 2014	Modern rock radio	Virgin Records, Capitol Records
United States	17 February 2014	Adult album alternative radio	Virgin Records, Capitol Records
United Kingdom	2 June 2014	Contemporary hit radio	Virgin Records
