= Laura Palmer (song) =

2013 song by Bastille

Single by Bastille

from the album Bad Blood
- B-side: "Thinkin Bout You"
- Released: 3 June 2013
- Recorded: 2011
- Genre: Power pop
- Length: 3:04
- Label: Virgin Records
- Songwriter: Dan Smith
- Producers: Dan Smith; Mark Crew

Bastille singles chronology
"Pompeii" (2013)	"Laura Palmer" (2013)	"Things We Lost in the Fire" (2013)

Music video
- "Bastille - Laura Palmer (Official Music Video)" on YouTube

"Laura Palmer" is a song by British band Bastille. It is the fifth single from their debut studio album Bad Blood, and the follow-up to their hit single "Pompeii". The song was originally released in 2011 as a track from their self-released EP of the same name (along with the tracks "Overjoyed", "Things We Lost in the Fire" and "Get Home"). It was re-released as its own digital download on 2 June 2013. It peaked at number 42 on the UK Singles Chart. The song took its name from the character in David Lynch and Mark Frost's TV series Twin Peaks.

== Critical reception ==
Lewis Corner of Digital Spy gave the song a positive review stating:

The track is immersed in inspiration from the popular show – from the blood-racing beats, to the haunting echoes. [...] The final result not only serves as an ear-friendly ode to Twin Peaks, but is sure to strengthen Bastille's very own cult following even more.

== Music video ==
A music video to accompany the release of "Laura Palmer" was first released onto YouTube on 11 April 2013 at a total length of three minutes and twenty-one seconds. In the video, which depicts a vague and bizarre story where group leader Dan Smith is kidnapped and released within less than two minutes, four people wear rubber masks. Toward the end, after being released, Smith is given a rubber mask; Smith dons the mask and removes it after a few seconds.

The version of the song used in the video is unique to it because of a sudden and unexpected interruption in the music. During the scene where Smith is kidnapped, which is shown as a camcorder shot, there is a jump-cut – as in a badly edited VHS tape – to a completely unrelated shot of a dog howling, also shot with a camcorder, and the song stops in the middle of the second chorus (the dog had already appeared in the video but with no accompanying audio). After five seconds, the video cuts back to a more neutral point-of-view shot and the song resumes.

== Track listing ==
Digital download

1. "Laura Palmer" – 3:06
2. "Thinkin Bout You" (featuring O.N.E.) – 3:05
3. "Laura Palmer" (RAC Mix) – 3:11
4. "Laura Palmer" (Imagine Dragons Remix) – 3:49
5. "Laura Palmer" (Kat Krazy Remix) – 3:32

7" vinyl

1. "Laura Palmer"
2. "Thinkin Bout You" (featuring O.N.E.)

== In popular culture ==
In 2012, an alternate version of the song was included in The Sims 3 on the in-game Dark Wave radio station.

== Charts ==
=== Weekly charts ===
Chart (2013)	Peak position
Australia (ARIA)	26
Belgium (Ultratop 50 Flanders)	12
Ireland (IRMA)	29
Italy (FIMI)	28
Poland Airplay (ZPAV)	8
Scottish Singles Sales (Official Charts)	30
UK Singles (Official Charts Company)	42
US Hot Rock & Alternative Songs (Billboard)	29

=== Year-end charts ===
Chart (2013)	Position
Belgium (Ultratop Flanders)	76

== Certifications ==
Region	Certification	Certified units/sales
Italy (FIMI)	Gold	15,000^{‡}
United Kingdom (BPI)	Silver	200,000^{‡}
^{‡} Sales+streaming figures based on certification alone.

== Release history ==
Region	Date	Format	Label
United Kingdom	31 May 2013	Digital download	Virgin Records
United Kingdom	3 June 2013	7" vinyl	Virgin Records
Italy	14 June 2013	Contemporary hit radio	EMI
