= Glory (Bastille song) =

Single by Bastille

from the album Wild World
- Released: 5 June 2017
- Recorded: 2016
- Genre: Electropop; pop
- Length: 4:41
- Label: Virgin Records
- Songwriter(s): Dan Smith
- Producer(s): Dan Smith; Mark Crew

Bastille singles chronology
"Blame" (2016)	"Glory" (2017)	"World Gone Mad" (2017)

"Glory" is a song by English indie pop band Bastille. It was released on 5 June 2017 as the fourth and final single from their second studio album, Wild World (2016). The song was written by Dan Smith, who handled the production along with Mark Crew.

== Background ==
In an interview with NME, Dan Smith said, "The song is about friendship and those woozy middle-of-the-night chats that drunkenly seem so important at the time. It's my favourite track on "Wild World", and we wanted the video to be a celebration of storytelling, relationships, and how two people can remember things completely differently."

== Music video ==
A music video to accompany the release of "Glory" was first released onto YouTube on 5 June 2017 at a total length of five minutes. The video was filmed in Dallas during the band's US tour and sees Dan Smith on an epic road trip. According to a press release, the band "attempts to make sense of a post truth era" in the video.

== Track listing ==
Digital download
No.	Title	Length
1.	"Glory"	4:41

== Charts ==
Chart (2017)	Peak position
Belgium (Ultratip Bubbling Under Flanders)	25
Belgium (Ultratip Bubbling Under Wallonia)	34
