= Send Them Off! =

Single by Bastille

from the album Wild World
- Released: 30 September 2016
- Recorded: 2016
- Genre: Electropop
- Length: 3:20
- Label: Virgin
- Songwriter: Dan Smith
- Producers: Smith; Mark Crew

Bastille singles chronology
"Good Grief" (2016)	"Send Them Off!" (2016)	"Blame" (2016)

"Send Them Off!" is a song by English indie pop band Bastille. It was released on 30 September 2016 as the second single from their second studio album, Wild World (2016). The song was written by Dan Smith, who handled the production along with Mark Crew. The song is featured in soundtrack of the EA Sports video game FIFA 17, and was brought back for FIFA 23, as part of the game's Ultimate FIFA Soundtrack (a compilation of 40 songs from past FIFA games).

== Critical reception ==
Rhian Daily of NME praised the song's hip-hop influences, as well as the lyrics (including the quotations of William Shakespeare). Jordan Osbourne of Vendor Culture gave the song a similar review, rating it a "7.5/10", and praising both the production and the influence of Othello and The Exorcist.

== Music video ==
A music video for the song was unveiled the same day it was released as a single. The music video features a young man traveling through a long hallway, a church ruin, a horsedrawn carriage driven by an hooded figure and ending up in a chapel while getting chased by a horned figure.

== Personnel ==
- Dan Smith – lead vocals, keyboards, programming
- Kyle Simmons – keyboards
- Will Farquarson – bass, acoustic guitar, electric guitar

== Charts ==
Chart (2016)	Peak position
Belgium (Ultratop 50 Flanders)	50
Belgium (Ultratip Bubbling Under Wallonia)	38
New Zealand Hot Singles (RMNZ)	9
Scotland Singles (OCC)	40
UK Singles (OCC)	76
US Hot Rock & Alternative Songs (Billboard)	20

== Certifications ==
Region	Certification	Certified units/sales
United Kingdom (BPI)	Silver	200,000^{‡}
^{‡} Sales+streaming figures based on certification alone.
