= Kate McGill =

Welsh singer-songwriter (born 1990)

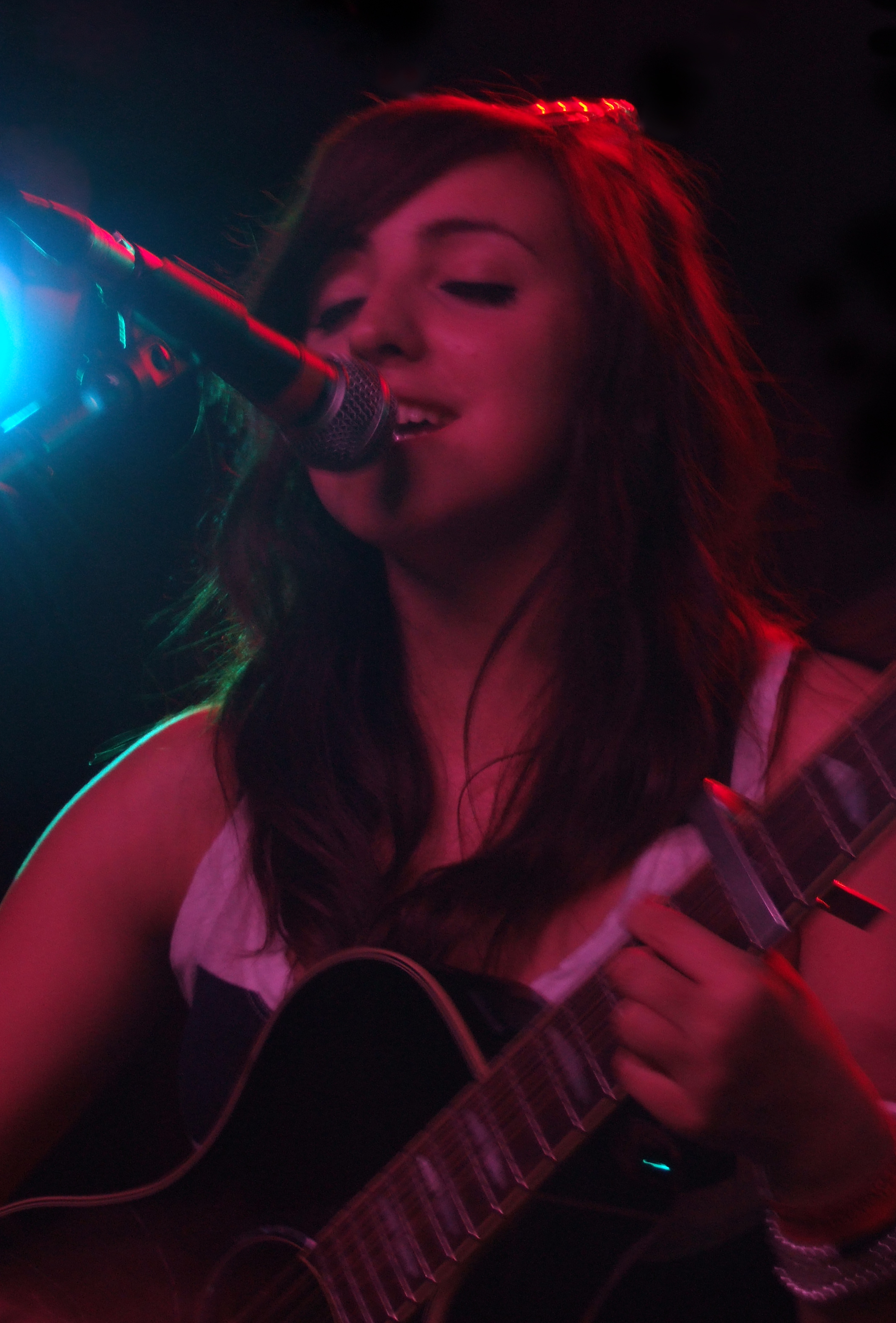
- McGill in 2010

Background information
- Birth name: Kate Laura McGill
- Born: 10 March 1990 (age 35); Carmarthen, Wales
- Origin: Plymouth, England
- Genres: Alternative; acoustic; pop
- Occupations: Singer-songwriter; guitarist; pianist
- Instruments: Vocals; guitar; piano
- Years active: 2007—present
- Labels: KLM Records
- Member of: Meadowlark

Kate Laura McGill (born 10 March 1990) is a Welsh singer-songwriter originally known for her covers of hit songs by artists such as Adele, Paramore, Mumford & Sons, Lady Gaga, Katy Perry, the Killers, and Maroon 5. In 2011, she released her debut album, Replaced. In 2013, she formed the band Meadowlark together with Daniel Broadley and Carl Jones. They have since released one studio album and a number of EPs.

== Career ==
During her career, McGill has uploaded over 100 videos with over eight hours of footage, with strangers from around the world covering her original songs. In late 2010, she beat over 2,000 competitors to win Tesco Entertainment's 1Click2Fame, netting her a £100,000 prize.

In 2011, McGill released her first studio album, titled Replaced. She went on to perform live at 34 Caffè Nero stores across the UK

On 22 March 2013, McGill announced she had formed a new band with Daniel Broadley and Carl Jones, called Meadowlark. On the same day, they released a live version of a track titled "Family Tree", which focuses on Kate's home life. Meadowlark released their first EP, Three Six Five, on 26 May 2014. In September of that year, it was announced on social media that Carl Jones would no longer be part of the band. Mcgill and Broadley released their first EP as a duo, named Dual, on 30 March 2015. Their single "Eyes Wide" gained popularity through the radio show BBC Music Introducing, and they performed at Glastonbury Festival on the BBC Introducing stage later that year. In 2016, Meadowlark released the Paraffin EP, followed by two singles, "Quicksand" and "Headlights". Their debut album, Postcards, came out on 30 June 2017.

== Discography ==
=== Meadowlark ===
Studio albums

- Postcards (2017)

EPs

- Three Six Five (2014)
- Dual (2015)
- Dual (Remixes) (2015)
- Paraffin (2016)
- Nocturnes (2017)
- Sunlight (2017)
- H.I.T.H. (Remixes) (2019)

=== Solo ===
Studio albums

- Replaced (2011)

EPs

- Replaced – The Live EP (2014)

Singles

- "Oh Mum, My Mum" (2019)
- "Maybe, Just Maybe" (2019)
- "Replaced (Acoustic)" (2020)

== Awards and nominations ==
| Year | Award | Category | Work | Outcome |
|---|---|---|---|---|
| 2010 | 1Click2Fame | Best Online Talent | Herself | Won |
