= Other People's Heartache =

Series of mixtapes by Bastille

Other People's Heartache is a series of mixtapes by Bastille. The first was released in February 2012, the second in December 2012, the third in December 2014, and the fourth in December 2018.

== Part one ==
Other People's Heartache

Mixtape by Bastille
- Released: 17 February 2012
- Length: 27:33

Bastille chronology
| Laura Palmer EP (2011) | Other People's Heartache (2012) | Other People's Heartache, Pt. 2 (2012) |

Other People's Heartache is a cover EP, self-released by the band Bastille in February 2012. Dan Smith described the concept behind the release as being to "create a fictional film score or film soundtrack using cover versions of songs". It was released online, available free. Smith stated that the group were contacted and asked to take down the tracks. The tracks "Of the Night" and "What Would You Do?" were later released on the compilation album All This Bad Blood (2013), with the former also released as a single.

=== Track listing ===
The EP was composed of mashups of cover versions and samples of other artists' music, film quotes, and the band's own songs.

Other People's Heartache
| No. | Title | Original artist(s) | Length |
|---|---|---|---|
| 1. | "Adagio for Strings (What Is Love?)" (featuring Maiday) | Samuel Barber, Haddaway | 3:59 |
| 2. | "What Would You Do?" | City High | 3:22 |
| 3. | "Requiem for Blue Jeans" | Clint Mansell, Kronos Quartet, Lana Del Rey | 3:57 |
| 4. | "Of the Night" | Corona, Snap! | 3:34 |
| 5. | "Titanium" (featuring Barnaby Keen Band) | David Guetta, Sia | 2:54 |
| 6. | "Love Don't Live Here" (featuring Rory Andrew, Jonas Jalhay and F.Stokes) | Rose Royce | 6:02 |
| 7. | "Falling" (featuring Ralph Pelleymounter) | Angelo Badalamenti, Julee Cruise | 3:45 |
| Total length: | | | 27:33 |

=== Critical response ===
PopMatters gave the EP 8/10, hailing it for "demonstrating the power of a good cover".

== Part two ==
Other People's Heartache, Pt. 2

Mixtape by Bastille
- Released: December 2012
- Length: 34:25

Bastille chronology
| Other People's Heartache (2012) | Other People's Heartache, Pt. 2 (2012) | Bad Blood (2013) |

Other People's Heartache, Pt. 2 is a cover EP self-released by Bastille in December 2012.

=== Track listing ===
Like the previous installment, Other People's Heartache, Pt. 2 largely comprises mashups of samples, cover songs, film quotes and the band's own music.

Other People's Heartache, Pt. 2
| No. | Title | Original artist(s) | Length |
|---|---|---|---|
| 1. | "Tuning In" (featuring HUMS Contemporary Choir) | | 1:02 |
| 2. | "Killer" (featuring F*U*G*Z) | Adamski, Seal, The Backstreet Boys, George Michael | 3:01 |
| 3. | "No Angels" (featuring Ella Eyre) | TLC, The xx | 4:00 |
| 4. | "Walk to Oblivion" (featuring Ralph Pelleymounter) | Gheorghe Zamfir, The ARC Choir | 2:21 |
| 5. | "Forever Ever" (featuring Jay Brown and Kae Tempest) | The Fugees, Enya | 3:42 |
| 6. | "Dreams" (featuring Gabrielle Aplin) | Fleetwood Mac | 4:19 |
| 7. | "Thinkin' Ahead" (featuring O.N.E. and Ric Elsworth) | Frank Ocean, Hans Zimmer | 4:03 |
| 8. | "Free" (featuring Ella Eyre and Erika) | Tina Turner, N-Trance | 3:18 |
| 9. | "Sweet Pompeii" | Calvin Harris, Florence Welch, Thomas Newman | 2:32 |
| 10. | "Basement" (featuring F*U*G*Z and F.Stokes) | | 3:51 |
| 11. | "Oh Holy Night" | Adolphe Adam | 2:16 |
| Total length: | | | 34:25 |

=== Critical reception ===
Cherwell gave the EP 4/5, commending its having built upon Part One, saying "Dan Smith getting even more ingenious with his connections between film and music and adventurous with his production". It praised the humour of the sampling: "'Sweet Pompeii', mostly a soulful cover of Calvin Harris' 'Sweet Nothing', almost seems like a practical joke on the listener as we go from the verse to a clip of Bernie Sanders talking about the economy to a hilariously unexpected sample of the exact beat break from Harris’ version."

== Part three ==
VS. (Other People's Heartache, Pt. III)

Mixtape by Bastille
- Released: 8 December 2014
- Length: 32:23
- Label: Virgin

Bastille chronology
| Haunt (2013) | VS. (Other People's Heartache, Pt. III) (2014) | Wild World (2016) |

Singles from VS. (Other People's Heartache, Pt. III)
- 1. "The Driver" Released: 6 June 2014; 2. "Bite Down" Released: 19 September 2014; 3. "Torn Apart" Released: 28 November 2014; 4. "Weapon" Released: 23 January 2015

VS. (Other People's Heartache, Pt. III) is an EP by Bastille, released in December 2014. Unlike the previous two EPs it does not feature covers, but instead a number of collaborations with other musical artists on original tracks, and was the first to be released commercially. The track "The Driver" was released as a part of a re-scored version of Drive.

=== Track listing ===
VS. (Other People's Heartache, Pt. III)
| No. | Title | Length |
|---|---|---|
| 1. | "Fall Into Your Arms" (featuring the Gemma Sharples Quartet) | 1:49 |
| 2. | "Bite Down" (featuring Haim) | 3:00 |
| 3. | "bad_news" (featuring MNEK) | 4:48 |
| 4. | "The Driver" | 4:22 |
| 5. | "Axe to Grind" (featuring Tyde and Rationale) | 4:48 |
| 6. | "Torn Apart" (featuring Grades) | 3:06 |
| 7. | "Torn Apart, Pt. II" (featuring Grades and Lizzo) | 1:02 |
| 8. | "Weapon" (featuring Angel Haze, F*U*G*Z and Braque) | 4:48 |
| 9. | "Remains" (featuring Rag'n'Bone Man and Skunk Anansie) | 4:40 |
| Total length: | | 32:23 |

=== Critical reception ===
The Guardian gave the EP 3/5 remarking that "most of the eight mashups and collaborations here feel fresh, even urgent". Digital Spy also awarded it 3/5, calling it a "mixed bag of a mixtape", drawing attention to "Fall Into Your Arms" and "Bite Down" as "highpoints". PopMatters gave it 7/10, calling "another fine outing for this impressive group, one that proves, much like its predecessors, that Bastille does its cleverest work when it goes off-album."

== Part four ==
Other People's Heartache, Pt. 4

Mixtape by Bastille
- Released: 7 December 2018
- Recorded: 2017–2018
- Length: 23:58
- Label: Virgin

Bastille chronology
| Wild World (2016) | Other People's Heartache, Pt. 4 (2018) | Doom Days (2019) |

Singles from Other People's Heartache, Pt. 4
- 1. "Grip" Released: 6 December 2018

Other People's Heartache, Pt. 4 was released digitally on 7 December 2018 and on clear vinyl for Record Store Day on 13 April 2019.

=== Track listing ===
Other People’s Heartache, Pt. 4
| No. | Title | Original artist | Length |
|---|---|---|---|
| 1. | "Wild World (Intro)" (featuring Kianja) | Cat Stevens | 2:03 |
| 2. | "Would I Lie to You?" (featuring Kianja, S-X and Craig David) | Charles & Eddie | 3:55 |
| 3. | "Grip" (with Seeb) | | 3:18 |
| 4. | "Don't Let Go (Love)" (featuring Kianja, Craig David and Swarmz; uncredited appearance by Charlie Barnes on guitar) | En Vogue | 4:08 |
| 5. | "Flowers" (featuring Rationale and James Arthur) | Sweet Female Attitude | 3:46 |
| 6. | "The Descent" (featuring Lily Moore, Moss Kena & Jacob Banks) | | 5:42 |
| 7. | "Warmth (Outro)" (featuring Moss Kena) | | 1:06 |
| Total length: | | | 23:58 |

== Give Me the Future + Dreams of the Past ==
Give Me the Future + Dreams of the Past is the Super Deluxe Edition of the Give Me the Future album; it was released on 26 August 2022. The album includes three "Paths": the original 13 Give Me the Future tracks, 8 tracks under the name Dreams of the Past, and 6 tracks under the Other People's Heartache name for a total of 9 new tracks.

Path 3: Other People's Heartache
| No. | Title | Length |
|---|---|---|
| 1. | "Other People's Heartache - Interlude" | 0:45 |
| 2. | "Run Into Trouble" (featuring Alok) | 3:02 |
| 3. | "Remind Me" | 3:02 |
| 4. | "Eight Hours" (featuring Tyde) | 3:28 |
| 5. | "Dancing in the Dark" | 3:07 |
| 6. | "Running Away" | 2:52 |
| Total length: | | 16:16 |
