= Of the Night =

2013 single by Bastille

Single by Bastille

from the album All This Bad Blood
- B-side: "Oblivion" (Live from Capitol Studios)
- Released: 11 October 2013
- Recorded: 2012
- Genre: Indie pop; electronica; alternative dance
- Length: 3:33
- Label: Virgin
- Songwriters: Benito Benitez, John "Virgo" Garrett III, Thea Austin, Giorgio Spagna, Francesco Bontempi, Annerley Gordon, Peter Glenister, Mike Gaffey
- Producer: Dan Smith

Bastille singles chronology
"Things We Lost in the Fire" (2013)	"Of the Night" (2013)	"Pompeii/Waiting All Night" (2014)

Music video
- "Bastille - Of The Night (Official Music Video)" on YouTube

"Of the Night" is a song by British band Bastille, released on 11 October 2013 as the lead single from All This Bad Blood (2013), a reissue of their debut studio album Bad Blood (2013). The song debuted at number two on the UK Singles Chart, and has also charted in several other countries.

The song was covered by Ellie Goulding at BBC Radio 1's Live Lounge.

== Background and release ==
"Of the Night" is a mash up of two 1990s Eurodance songs, the 1993 hit "The Rhythm of the Night" by Italian act Corona and the 1992 hit "Rhythm Is a Dancer" by German group Snap!. The song was first featured on Bastille's mixtape Other People's Heartache, which was released in 2012 as a free download.

That's a strange one. It's kind of a tongue-in-cheek thing that we did that kind of got out of hand. It started because Dan [Smith] got really ill when we first got signed, and so to ease his way back into vocal recording we decided to do some mixtapes using old songs that we listened to growing up. These were interesting songs you wouldn't expect us to cover and try to reinvent in a more current kind of way, and then it became one of our biggest songs. Then we started doing it live just because it was a cool song and was fun to play, and audiences started to really kind of dig it. And it all started like a little experiment."

— Will Farquarson, talking about "Of the Night"

"Of the Night" was later used in a promotional trailer for the eighth series of ITV's Dancing on Ice in January 2013. It received its first radio play on Huw Stephens' BBC Radio 1 show on 9 October 2013, and was released digitally on 11 October 2013. On 15 November 2013, Of the Night EP was released, featuring three remixes of the song and a live recording of "Oblivion".

== Critical reception ==
Paul Leake of Click Music gave the track five out of five stars, and called it "one of the most inspired covers ever made," adding that it evokes "doe-eyed nostalgia for the purity of 90s' dance music" and "modulates between the sombre heartbreak and quiet intensity."

Digital Spy's Robert Copsey wrote, "On paper, Dan Smith & Co.'s gloomy, atmospheric re-working sounds like career-suicide, and while it certainly isn't that, by opting for such a daring choice it feels like all their hard work at carefully carving out their own niche has come undone."

== Commercial performance ==
While set to become the band's first number one single at the midweek stage, the song debuted at number two on the UK Singles Chart, selling 80,257 copies in its first week, only 660 copies less than Lily Allen's version of "Somewhere Only We Know", becoming the narrowest chart race of 2013.

== Music video ==
An official music video promoting the song was released onto YouTube on 9 October 2013. It was directed by Dave Ma (who has previously worked with Foals, Ghostpoet and Delphic), and stars American actor James Russo (Once Upon a Time in America, Django Unchained) as the main protagonist, a Los Angeles police detective who visits several crime scenes, including a woman shot at a motel, a woman overdosed on pills, a man drowned in a pool, a woman asphyxiated in a car trunk, a store clerk shot during a robbery, and a woman in a bathroom with her throat slashed. The corpses sing along with the music (it is heavily implied that the police detective is going crazy, hallucinating seeing the corpses sing, with their voices lip-synced). At one point the band members are seen conversing with the police, then told to face the wall and put their hands on their heads, while an officer searches them. The video ends with the police detective lying on the floor of a bathroom, singing along with the last few lines of the song. The camera pans out to reveal he has slashed his wrists. Mike Wass of Idolator called the video "quite possibly the most depressing video of the year."

== Track listing ==
Digital download

1. "Of the Night" – 3:34

Digital download (EP)

1. "Of the Night" – 3:34
2. "Oblivion" (Live from Capitol Studios) – 3:08
3. "Of the Night" (MNEK Remix) – 4:38
4. "Of the Night" (Icarus Remix) – 5:20
5. "Of the Night" (Kove Remix) – 6:15
6. "Of the Night" (music video) – 3:51

CD maxi single

1. "Of the Night" – 3:34
2. "Of the Night" (MNEK Remix) – 4:38

10" vinyl (limited to 1,000 copies)

Side A

1. "Of the Night" – 3:34
2. "Of the Night" (MNEK Remix) – 4:38

Side B

1. "Oblivion" (Live from Capitol Studios) – 3:08
2. "Of the Night" (Icarus Remix) – 5:20

== Charts and certifications ==
=== Weekly charts ===
Weekly chart performance
Chart (2013–2014)	Peak position
Australia (ARIA)	6
Austria (Ö3 Austria Top 40)	15
Belgium (Ultratop 50 Flanders)	39
Belgium (Ultratip Bubbling Under Wallonia)	2
Czech Republic Singles Digital (ČNS IFPI)	90
Denmark (Tracklisten)	22
Finland Airplay (Radiosoittolista)	15
Finnish Downloads (Latauslista)	17
Euro Digital Song Sales (Billboard)	4
Germany (GfK)	10
Hungary (Rádiós Top 40)	3
Ireland (IRMA)	2
Italy (FIMI)	25
Lebanon (Lebanese Top 20)	9
Netherlands (Single Top 100)	88
Netherlands (Tipparade)	2
New Zealand (Recorded Music NZ)	28
Russia Airplay (TopHit)	8
Scotland Singles (OCC)	2
Slovakia Airplay (ČNS IFPI)	33
Slovakia Singles Digital (ČNS IFPI)	80
Slovenia (SloTop50)	21
Spain (PROMUSICAE)	23
Sweden (Sverigetopplistan)	39
Switzerland (Schweizer Hitparade)	19
UK Singles (OCC)	2
Ukraine Airplay (TopHit)	22
US Hot Rock & Alternative Songs (Billboard)	35

=== Year-end charts ===
Annual chart rankings
Chart (2013)	Position
Hungary (Rádiós Top 40)	79
UK Singles (Official Charts Company)	74

Chart (2014)	Position
Austria (Ö3 Austria Top 40)	72
Germany (Official German Charts)	63
Hungary (Rádiós Top 40)	21
Russia Airplay (TopHit)	119

=== Certifications ===
Certifications and sales
Region	Certification	Certified units/sales
Australia (ARIA)	2× Platinum	140,000^{‡}
Austria (IFPI Austria)	Gold	15,000^{*}
Brazil (Pro-Música Brasil)	Gold	30,000^{‡}
Germany (BVMI)	Gold	150,000^{^}
Italy (FIMI)	Gold	15,000^{‡}
New Zealand (RMNZ)	Gold	7,500^{*}
Sweden (GLF)	Platinum	40,000^{‡}
United Kingdom (BPI)	Platinum	600,000^{‡}
Streaming
Denmark (IFPI Danmark)	Gold	900,000^{†}
^{*} Sales figures based on certification alone.^{^} Shipments figures based on certification alone.^{‡} Sales+streaming figures based on certification alone.^{†} Streaming-only figures based on certification alone.

== Release history ==
Street dates
Region	Date	Format	Label
United Kingdom	11 October 2013	Digital download	Virgin Records
Italy	25 October 2013	Contemporary hit radio	Universal Music
Italy	8 November 2013	Contemporary hit radio	Universal Music
United Kingdom	15 November 2013	Digital download (EP)	Virgin Records
United Kingdom	18 November 2013	10" vinyl	Virgin Records
Germany	4 February 2014	Compact disc	Virgin Records
United States	19 April 2014	10" vinyl	Virgin Records

== See also ==
- Mashup (music)
- Being Nobody – by Richard X vs. Liberty X
