= Blame (Bastille song) =

- Single cover

Single by Bastille

from the album Wild World
- Released: 15 December 2016
- Recorded: 2015–2016
- Genre: Alternative rock
- Length: 2:55
- Label: Virgin Records
- Songwriter: Dan Smith
- Producers: Dan Smith; Mark Crew

Bastille singles chronology
"Send Them Off!" (2016)	"Blame" (2016)	"Glory" (2017)

"Blame" is a song by English indie pop band Bastille. It was released on 30 September 2016 as the third single from their second studio album, Wild World (2016). The song was written by Dan Smith, who handled the production along with Mark Crew.

== Background ==
In a statement Dan Smith said, "'Blame' was one of the first songs we wrote for Wild World and it has grown and developed a life of its own as we've played it live over the last year or so. Guitars have become a bigger part of our sound on this record and I think that's pretty evident here. The song is about a dramatic stand off between two gangsters and nods to American History X and The Godfather. We were really excited to make the video with Elliott Sellers, whom we really admire. It’s been a fun excuse to expand upon the visual world of this album and we can’t wait for people to see it."

== Music video ==
A music video to accompany the release of "Blame" was first released onto YouTube on 15 December 2016 at a total length of five minutes and nineteen seconds.

== Track listing ==
Digital download
No.	Title	Length
1.	"Blame"	2:55

Digital download - Remixes
No.	Title	Length
1.	"Blame" (Claptone Remix)	3:34
2.	"Blame" (Dave Winnel Remix)	3:54
3.	"Blame" (Bearcubs Remix)	4:16
4.	"Blame" (Vaults Remix)	3:32

== Charts ==
=== Weekly charts ===
Weekly chart performance for "Blame"
Chart (2017)	Peak position
Canada Rock (Billboard)	27
Scotland (OCC)	53
US Hot Rock & Alternative Songs (Billboard)	27
US Rock & Alternative Airplay (Billboard)	4

=== Year-end charts ===
Year-end chart performance for "Blame"
Chart (2017)	Position
US Hot Rock Songs (Billboard)	69
US Rock Airplay (Billboard)	26
