= Good Grief (song) =

2016 single by Bastille

Single by Bastille

from the album Wild World
- Released: 16 June 2016
- Recorded: 2016
- Genre: Indie pop
- Length: 3:26
- Label: Virgin
- Songwriter: Dan Smith
- Producers: Dan Smith; Mark Crew

Bastille singles chronology
"Torn Apart" (2014)	"Good Grief" (2016)	"Send Them Off!" (2016)

"Good Grief" is a song by English indie pop band Bastille. It was released on 16 June 2016 as the lead single from their second studio album, Wild World (2016). The song was written by Dan Smith, who handled the production along with Mark Crew. It is their first single released to feature touring member Charlie Barnes.

The song topped a 2020 NME poll of millennials for what song they would like to be played at their funeral ahead of Wiz Khalifa and Charlie Puth's song 'See You Again'.

== Background ==
On 16 June 2016, Annie Mac debuted "Good Grief" on her BBC Radio 1 show as the "hottest track." Following the debut, the band released the single to radio and as a digital download.

== Critical reception ==
Georgia Ivey of Clash said that the song was "surprisingly upbeat considering its reflection on the grieving process." Sarah Jamieson of DIY called the track a tone-appropriate album opener, saying that its "pomp and grandeur juxtaposed perfectly with Dan Smith’s dark-tinged tale of coping with life after death." NME writer Charlotte Gunn described it as "a euphoric pop track about death and funerals and being sad, but done Bastille-style, with a massive chorus and an X Factor-worthy key change." In his review of the album, Andy Baber of musicOMH felt the song was a "misleading introduction" to the record's various political themes, but said that it establishes the band's "move towards the more eclectic approach favoured on their mixtapes – as evidenced by the sampling of Kelly LeBrock from ‘80s movie Weird Science."

== Music video ==
The video for "Good Grief" debuted on 22 June 2016. In addition to Smith's disembodied head, the video also features a burning house, a bank robbery, a running man, a teddy bear, rollerskating girls, a red car, a payphone, a game show, and scenes depicting nudity. A censored version was added, deleting or blurring some of the more offensive scenes. The clean version has gained over 8.5 million views as of June 2020. The original video has gained over 16 million views as of June 2020.

== Track listing ==
Digital download
No.	Title	Length
1.	"Good Grief"	3:26

7" vinyl
No.	Title	Length
1.	"Good Grief"	3:26
2.	"Good Grief" (Acoustic)	3:26

Bunker Sessions
No.	Title	Length
1.	"Good Grief" (Bunker Sessions)	3:28

Autograf Remix
No.	Title	Length
1.	"Good Grief" (Autograf Remix)	3:50

Don Diablo Remix
No.	Title	Length
1.	"Good Grief" (Don Diablo Remix)	3:59

MK Remix
No.	Title	Length
1.	"Good Grief" (MK Remix)	5:36

== Covers and remixes ==
The song has received covers by upcoming artists such as, Aaron Fleming, Chris Brenner, Connor Everitt, Felicia Lu, and Phoebe Whalley. Don Diablo and Autograf released official remixes for the song via iTunes, respectively on 8 July and 22 July 2016.

== Charts ==
=== Weekly charts ===
Chart (2016)	Peak position
Argentina (Monitor Latino)	10
Austria (Ö3 Austria Top 40)	33
Canada Rock (Billboard)	18
Belgium (Ultratop 50 Flanders)	20
Belgium (Ultratip Bubbling Under Wallonia)	12
Euro Digital Song Sales (Billboard)	11
Germany (GfK)	46
Hungary (Rádiós Top 40)	8
Ireland (IRMA)	53
Italy (FIMI)	34
Japan Hot 100 (Billboard)	86
Mexico Airplay (Billboard)	48
Mexico Ingles Airplay (Billboard)	2
Netherlands (Dutch Top 40)	13
Netherlands (Single Top 100)	47
Poland Airplay (ZPAV)	13
Portugal (AFP)	84
Scottish Singles Sales (Official Charts)	6
Slovenia (SloTop50)	23
UK Singles (Official Charts)	13
US Bubbling Under Hot 100 (Billboard)	12
US Adult Alternative Airplay (Billboard)	4
US Adult Pop Airplay (Billboard)	23
US Alternative Airplay (Billboard)	2
US Dance Club Songs (Billboard)	10
US Hot Rock & Alternative Songs (Billboard)	9
US Pop Airplay (Billboard)	40
US Rock & Alternative Airplay (Billboard)	4

=== Year-end charts ===
Chart (2016)	Position
Argentina (Monitor Latino)	37
Belgium (Ultratop Flanders)	69
Netherlands (Dutch Top 40)	49
UK Singles (Official Charts Company)	66
US Adult Alternative Songs (Billboard)	16
US Alternative Songs (Billboard)	13
US Hot Rock Songs (Billboard)	28
US Rock Airplay (Billboard)	14

== Certifications ==
Region	Certification	Certified units/sales
Austria (IFPI Austria)	Gold	15,000^{‡}
Brazil (Pro-Música Brasil)	Platinum	60,000^{‡}
Germany (BVMI)	Gold	200,000^{‡}
Italy (FIMI)	Platinum	50,000^{‡}
New Zealand (RMNZ)	Platinum	30,000^{‡}
United Kingdom (BPI)	2× Platinum	1,200,000^{‡}
^{‡} Sales+streaming figures based on certification alone.

== Release history ==
Region	Date	Format	Label	Ref.
Worldwide	16 June 2016	Digital download	Virgin	
United Kingdom	23 June 2016	Contemporary hit radio	Virgin	
United States	12 September 2016	Adult contemporary radio	Capitol	
United States	13 September 2016	Top 40 radio	Capitol	
United States	7 October 2016	7" vinyl	Virgin	
