= Bad Blood (Bastille album) =

Studio album by Bastille
- Released: 4 March 2013
- Recorded: June 2012 – January 2013; London, England
- Genres: Indie pop; indie rock; synth-pop; alternative dance
- Length: 43:55 (Original release); 82:59 (All This Bad Blood)
- Labels: Virgin EMI (UK), Virgin (US), Universal Music Group (Worldwide)
- Producers: Mark Crew, Dan Smith

Bastille chronology
Other People's Heartache, Pt. 2 (2012)	Bad Blood (2013)	Haunt EP (2013)

Singles from Bad Blood
- 1. "Overjoyed" Released: 27 April 2012; 2. "Bad Blood" Released: 19 August 2012; 3. "Flaws" Released: 21 October 2012; 4. "Pompeii" Released: 11 January 2013; 5. "Laura Palmer" Released: 3 June 2013; 6. "Things We Lost in the Fire" Released: 23 August 2013; 7. "Oblivion" Released: 8 September 2014

All This Bad Blood
- Cover of the extended album version, featuring a Buick Riviera "Boattail"

Singles from All This Bad Blood
- 1. "Of the Night" Released: 11 October 2013

Bad Blood (stylised as "BΔD BLOOD") is the debut studio album by English band Bastille. It was released on 4 March 2013 in the United Kingdom, and on 3 September 2013 in the United States, and features the singles "Overjoyed", "Bad Blood", "Flaws", "Pompeii", "Laura Palmer", "Things We Lost in the Fire" and "Oblivion". The album was recorded in London and produced by Mark Crew and the band's lead singer Dan Smith.

The record debuted at number one on the UK Albums Chart, has spent three non-consecutive weeks at the top, and is certified triple platinum in the UK. It has also charted on the US Billboard 200, as well as in several other countries.

An extended version of the album, All This Bad Blood, was released on 25 November 2013, and featured the single "Of the Night".

It was nominated for British Album of the Year at the 2014 BRIT Awards.

== Background ==
The band initially included two other musicians on violin and cello, but dwindled down to the four current members. Smith, Wood, Farquarson, and Simmons played together before the band was started, but all of their first songs were written and recorded by Smith. On 4 July 2011 they released their debut single "Flaws"/"Icarus" through London-based independent record label Young & Lost Club, released on 7" vinyl limited to 300 copies. The single now can sell for over £300. In late 2011 they self-released their debut EP Laura Palmer as a digital download and on CD.

They signed to Virgin Records and released their second single "Overjoyed", but due to little promotion for the single, it failed to chart. In early 2012, they also released the mixtape Other People's Heartache as a free download, which featured covers of various different songs. They began recording their debut album in June 2012, which Dan Smith said "we basically made the album in a studio the size of a cupboard, so it was one extreme to the other." They released a third single, "Bad Blood", in August 2012, which managed to chart a number 90 in the UK Singles Chart. In late 2012 they released Other People's Heartache Pt 2, and had finished recording their debut album, but were deciding on the track list. They re-released "Flaws" in October 2012 on vinyl and digital download, which managed to chart at number 21 in the UK Singles Chart. In support of the single's release, they headlined their short Flaws Tour.

== Release and promotion ==
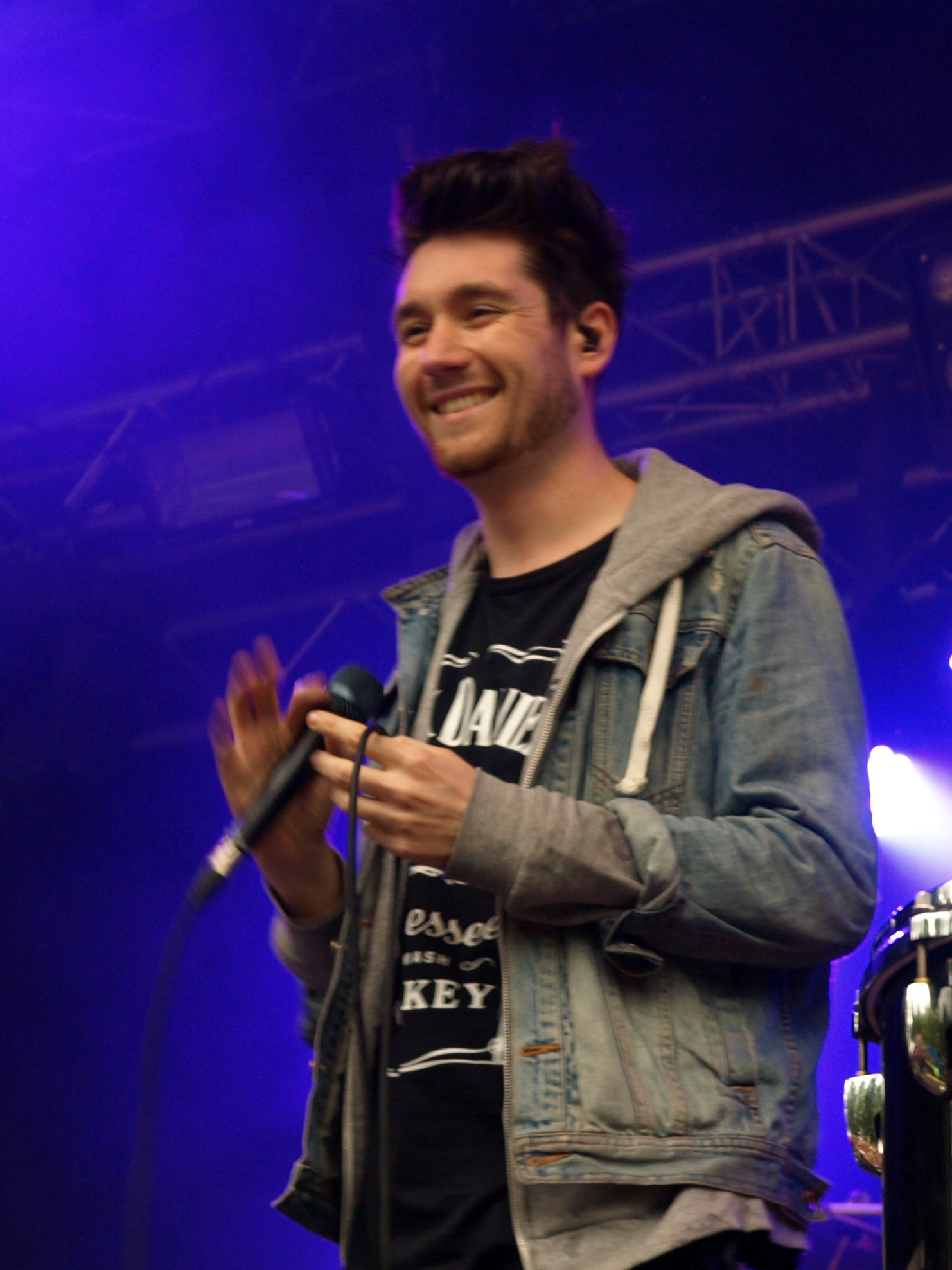
Dan Smith at Provinssirock festival 2013 in Seinäjoki, Finland

Bad Blood was announced in January 2013, along with the track listing, as well as the next single "Pompeii". "Pompeii" was released in February 2013 on vinyl and as a digital download, and debuted at number 2 on the UK Singles Chart, as well as number 5 in the US Billboard Hot 100 and number 1 on the Alternative Songs chart. The single has been certified platinum in the UK, and double platinum in the US. Bad Blood was released on 4 March in the UK, and debuted at number 1 in the UK Albums Chart. On 11 March, Bastille were announced to be playing at Leeds and Reading Festival in August 2013.

In an interview with Digital Spy in March 2013, "Laura Palmer" was revealed to be the fifth single to be released from the album, by lead vocalist, Dan Smith. It was released on 3 June 2013, and an accompanying video for the track premiered through the band's official VEVO page on 12 April 2013. The group joined English rock band Muse as a supporting act on their The 2nd Law Tour in May 2013 and did so again in June 2013. In May 2013, Bastille released their Haunt EP in the US via iTunes. On Saturday 6 July the band headlined their first UK summer music festival at Blissfields. On 24 August 2013, "Things We Lost in the Fire" was released as sixth and the last single from the band's debut album. A music video for the song was shot in Vilnius and Kėdainiai, Lithuania. It charted in September 2013 at number 28 in the UK Singles Chart, and number 47 in the US Billboard Hot Rock Songs. The album was released in the US on 3 September, and debuted at number 11 on the Billboard 200.

Bad Blood was re-issued on 25 November 2013 as a double album called All This Bad Blood. The first disc is a reissue of Bad Blood, and the second disc is split into two parts, titled All This Bad Blood and Other People's Heartache. All This Bad Blood contains four songs which were previously released as B-sides from the singles of Bad Blood: "Haunt (Demo)", "Sleepsong", "Durban Skies" and "Poet". "Weight of Living Pt. I", "The Silence" and "Laughter Lines" were featured on The Extended Cut version of Bad Blood. Other People's Heartache is a selection from the Bastille's two mixtapes, Other People's Heartache and Other People's Heartache, Pt. 2, and also contains two completely new tracks recorded in the last few weeks, "The Draw" and "Skulls". The lead single promoting the album, "Of the Night", was released on 11 October 2013. The song is a mash-up of "The Rhythm of the Night" by Corona and "Rhythm Is a Dancer" by Snap!. An accompanying music video for the single, directed by Dave Ma and starring James Russo, was released on 9 October 2013. "Of the Night" debuted at number 2 on the UK Singles Chart, and has also charted in several other countries.

The band performed on Saturday Night Live on 25 January 2014. In February 2014, Bastille won the BRIT Award for Best Breakthrough Act, as well as being nominated for Best British Group, Single of the Year for "Pompeii" and Album of the Year. They performed a remixed version of "Pompeii" with Rudimental and their song "Waiting All Night" at the ceremony, which was released digitally and charted at number 21 in the UK. Two hours after their appearance, sales of Bad Blood were up by 132% and "Pompeii" had climbed 29 places in the singles chart. Bad Blood then went at number 1 again for two weeks, and has since gone double platinum. In March 2014, "Flaws" was re-released for a third time but as a radio-only single. On 1 April 2014, the Official Charts Company announced that Bad Blood was the biggest selling digital album of 2013, and the eleventh biggest selling album in the over-all Official Artist Albums Top 40 of 2013. As of December 2014, the album has sold 730,001 copies in the UK. "Oblivion" was released as the eighth and final single, and on 21 July the video for the song was released on their Vevo account.

All This Bad Blood was released as a limited edition 2LP for Record Store Day 2020, for the first time on 29 August 2020.

On 14 June 2023, the band released "No Angels", a mashup of The xx song "Angels" and "No Scrubs" by TLC, featuring Ella Eyre. In conjunction, they announced a celebratory double album Bad Blood X to commemorate the 10th anniversary of their debut album. The release features three never-before-heard demos, two additional covers and live versions of songs from the original release of the album.

== Critical reception ==
Professional ratings
Aggregate scores
Source	Rating
AnyDecentMusic?	6.6/10
Metacritic	58/100
Review scores
Source	Rating
AllMusic	3.5/5 stars
Consequence of Sound	2.5/5 stars
DIY	8/10
Drowned in Sound	6/10
The Guardian	2/5 stars
NME	5/10
Now	2/5
The Observer	3/5 stars
PopMatters	8/10
Q	2/5 stars

Bad Blood has received mixed reviews from music critics. At Metacritic, which assigns a normalised rating out of 100 to reviews from mainstream critics, the album received an average score of 58, based on 12 reviews.

In an enthusiastic review for DIY, Sarah Jamieson called the band's frontman Dan Smith "a storyteller" and "a magnificent musician," adding that "his music is a thrilling example of what great pop music can achieve." She wrote, "The beautiful part about Bad Blood is that it is both entirely predictable yet completely disarming. (...) The exploration of any and all sounds; the delicate use of strings to heighten emotion, the touching piano-based 'Oblivion'. There are moments, instruments, timings, buried within his experimentation that take you entirely by surprise."

Brice Ezell of PopMatters compared the band to the sound of Coldplay in a positive review and wrote, "booming male choirs, string effects, echoey pianos, allusions to Greek mythology and the Bible – Bastille brings out all the artillery on Bad Blood, and the result is nothing less than earth-shattering." He called it a "debut that's as infectious as it is dramatically powerful."

BBC's Matthew Horton wrote that "Smith and Bastille really deliver, ranging earworm choruses across the album. There's something 80s about the heart-swelling melodies of 'Oblivion' and the glorious 'Weight of Living, Pt. II', but only because they evoke a-ha and Tears for Fears in their determination to be both catchy and muscular."

In a less positive review, Jamie Fullerton of NME magazine wrote that "Bastille want everyone to like them," attributing different songs from the album to various "target markets" the group seemed to be aiming at, such as fans of Arcade Fire, Coldplay or Ed Sheeran. Fullerton commented, "Alas, all this greedy grasping means the London newcomers can't really get a firm grip on anything, meaning Bad Blood comes out with about as much identity as a Facebook commenter without a profile picture."

Michael Hann of The Guardian gave the album two out of five stars and wrote, "By bolting on the merest hint of dance beats to his [Dan Smith's] absolutely conventional, mildly melancholic piano ballads (descending chord sequences, the internationally recognised signifier of mild melancholy, abound), he has spruced up the formula that has dominated mainstream pop-rock for more than a decade. That said, it's hard to work out why these songs have made a greater connection than those of a hundred like-minded songwriters."

The album was ranked at number three on Digital Spy's list of top of albums 2013.

== Track listing ==
All songs written by Dan Smith.

=== Bad Blood ===
Standard edition
No.	Title	Length
1.	"Pompeii"	3:34
2.	"Things We Lost in the Fire"	4:01
3.	"Bad Blood"	3:33
4.	"Overjoyed"	3:26
5.	"These Streets"	2:55
6.	"Weight of Living, Pt. II"	2:55
7.	"Icarus"	3:45
8.	"Oblivion"	3:16
9.	"Flaws"	3:38
10.	"Daniel in the Den"	3:09
11.	"Laura Palmer"	3:06
12.	"Get Home"	3:11
13.	"Weight of Living, Pt. I" (hidden track)	3:26
Total length:		43:55

Standard edition bonus digital tracks
No.	Title	Length
14.	"These Streets" (Live at KOKO)	2:56
15.	"Get Home" (Live at KOKO)	2:54
Total length:		49:45

The Extended Cut bonus tracks
No.	Title	Length
14.	"Weight of Living, Pt. I"	3:26
15.	"The Silence"	3:51
16.	"Laughter Lines"	4:04
17.	"Bad Blood" (Live Piano Version)	3:28
18.	"Things We Lost in the Fire" (Abbey Road Session)	4:01
19.	"Laura Palmer" (Abbey Road Session)	3:02
20.	"Flaws" (Live Acoustic Version)	3:38
21.	"Flaws" (Abbey Road Session)	4:19
22.	"Overjoyed" (music video)	3:43
23.	"Bad Blood" (music video)	3:47
24.	"Flaws" (music video)	3:41
25.	"Pompeii" (music video)	3:52
Total length:		88:47

The Extended Cut online streaming bonus tracks
No.	Title	Length
14.	"The Silence"	3:51
15.	"Laughter Lines"	4:04
16.	"Bad Blood" (Live Piano Version)	3:28
17.	"Things We Lost in the Fire" (Abbey Road Session)	4:01
18.	"Laura Palmer" (Abbey Road Session)	3:02
19.	"Flaws" (Live Acoustic Version)	3:38
Total length:		65:59

Asia bonus tracks
No.	Title	Length
14.	"Pompeii (Kat Krazy Remix)"	3:37
15.	"Things We Lost in the Fire (Torn Remix)"	5:23
Total length:		52:55

Japan bonus tracks
No.	Title	Length
14.	"Weight of Living, Pt. I"	3:28
15.	"The Silence"	3:51
16.	"Laughter Lines"	4:04
17.	"Poet"	2:45
18.	"Haunt (Demo)"	2:52
19.	"Sleepsong"	3:42
20.	"Durban Skies"	4:11
Total length:		68:48

United States bonus tracks
No.	Title	Length
14.	"The Silence"	3:51
15.	"Weight of Living, Pt. I"	3:28
16.	"Laughter Lines"	4:04
Total length:		55:18

=== All This Bad Blood ===
Disc 1 – Bad Blood
No.	Title	Length
1.	"Pompeii"	3:34
2.	"Things We Lost in the Fire"	4:01
3.	"Bad Blood"	3:33
4.	"Overjoyed"	3:26
5.	"These Streets"	2:55
6.	"Weight of Living, Pt. II"	2:55
7.	"Icarus"	3:45
8.	"Oblivion"	3:16
9.	"Flaws"	3:38
10.	"Daniel in the Den"	3:09
11.	"Laura Palmer"	3:06
12.	"Get Home"	3:08
Total length:		40:26

Disc 2, Part 1 – All This Bad Blood
No.	Title	Length
1.	"Poet"	2:44
2.	"The Silence"	3:51
3.	"Haunt (Demo)"	2:53
4.	"Weight of Living, Pt. I"	3:26
5.	"Sleepsong"	3:40
6.	"Durban Skies"	4:11
7.	"Laughter Lines"	4:04

Disc 2, Part 2 – Other People's Heartache
No.	Title	Length
8.	"Previously on Other People's Heartache..."	1:06
9.	"Of the Night" (Rhythm Is a Dancer / The Rhythm of the Night mashup; Thea Austin, Benito Benites, Francesco Bontempi, Michael Gaffey, Pete Glenister, Annehley Gordon, John Garrett III, Giorgio Spagna)	3:34
10.	"The Draw"	3:14
11.	"What Would You Do" (City High cover) (Robby Pardlo, Ryan Toby)	3:03
12.	"Skulls"	4:11
13.	"Tuning Out..."	2:36
Total length:		42:33

Disc 2, Target exclusive bonus tracks
No.	Title	Length
14.	"Pompeii" (Live from Capitol Studios)	3:33
15.	"Oblivion" (Live from Capitol Studios)	3:08
Total length:		49:14

Disc 2, Dutch edition bonus tracks
No.	Title	Length
14.	"Laura Palmer" (Abbey Road Session)	3:02
15.	"Things We Lost in the Fire" (Abbey Road Session)	4:01
16.	"Oblivion" (Live from Capitol Studios)	3:33
17.	"Pompeii" (Live from Capitol Studios)	3:08
18.	"Bad Blood" (Live Piano Version)	3:28
Total length:		59:45

Disc 2, Belgian edition bonus tracks
No.	Title	Length
14.	"Pompeii" (Live at Studio Brussel /Acoustic)	3:02
15.	"Flaws" (Live at MNM / Acoustic)	4:01
16.	"Laura Palmer" (Abbey Road Sessions)	3:33
17.	"Pompeii" (Live with Film Orchestra)	3:08
18.	"Things We Lost In The Fire" (Abbey Road Sessions)	3:28
19.	"Of The Night" (Live at Rock Werchter 2014 /Explicit)	3:33
20.	"Pompeii" (Live at Rock Werchter 2014)	3:08
21.	"Bad_News"	3:28
Total length:		69:54

== Personnel ==
Credits adapted from AllMusic.

Bastille

- Dan Smith – Lead vocals, keyboards, piano, percussion, string arrangements, production, programming
- Kyle Simmons – Keyboards, percussion, backing vocals
- Will Farquarson – Bass, keyboards, acoustic guitar, electric guitar, backing vocals
- Chris "Woody" Wood – Drums, percussion, backing vocals

Technical personnel

- Mark Crew – Mixing, production, programming
- Mark 'Spike' Stent – Mixing
- Matty Green – Assistant mixing
- Bob Ludwig – Mastering
- Naweed Ahmed – Mastering
- Nick Burgess – A&R
- Polly Comber (Black Fox Management) – Management
- Josh Smith (Black Fox Management) – Management

Additional musicians

- Mark Crew – Keyboards, string arrangements
- Verity Evanson – Cello, string arrangements
- Juliet Lee – Violin
- Sophie Lockett – Violin
- Gemma Sharples – Violin
- Willemijn Steenbakkers – Violin
- Alexandra Urquhart – Viola
- Richard Phillips – Cello
- Dave DeRose – Drums
- Ian Dudfield – Backing vocals
- Ralph Pelleymounter – Backing vocals
- Josh Platman – Backing vocals
- Jon Willoughby – Backing vocals

== Charts ==
=== Weekly charts ===
Bad Blood
Chart (2013–14)	Peak position
Australian Albums (ARIA)	10
Austrian Albums (Ö3 Austria)	31
Belgian Albums (Ultratop Flanders)	6
Belgian Albums (Ultratop Wallonia)	58
Canadian Albums (Billboard)	19
Dutch Albums (Album Top 100)	9
French Albums (SNEP)	103
German Albums (Offizielle Top 100)	23
Greek Albums (IFPI)	11
Irish Albums (IRMA)	5
Italian Albums (FIMI)	33
New Zealand Albums (RMNZ)	28
Norwegian Albums (VG-lista)	10
Portuguese Albums (AFP)	30
Scottish Albums (Official Charts)	1
Swedish Albums (Sverigetopplistan)	42
Swiss Albums (Schweizer Hitparade)	15
UK Albums (Official Charts)	1
UK Album Downloads (Official Charts)	1
US Billboard 200	11
US Top Alternative Albums (Billboard)	2
US Top Rock Albums (Billboard)	3

All This Bad Blood
Chart (2013–16)	Peak position
Czech Albums (ČNS IFPI)	48
Danish Albums (Hitlisten)	25
Finnish Albums (Suomen virallinen lista)	27
Italian Albums (FIMI)	37
New Zealand Albums (RMNZ)	19
Polish Albums (ZPAV)	50
Swiss Albums (Schweizer Hitparade)	66

=== Year-end charts ===
Bad Blood
Chart (2013)	Position
Australian Albums (ARIA)	84
Belgian Albums (Ultratop Flanders)	19
Germany (Official German Charts)	70
UK Albums (OCC)	11
US Top Alternative Albums (Billboard)	37
US Top Rock Albums (Billboard)	63

Chart (2014)	Position
Dutch Albums (MegaCharts)	40
UK Albums (OCC)	20
US Alternative Albums (Billboard)	6
US Billboard 200	40
US Billboard Digital Albums	23
US Top Rock Albums (Billboard)	7

Chart (2015)	Position
US Alternative Albums (Billboard)	42
US Top Rock Albums (Billboard)	67

All This Bad Blood
Chart (2013)	Position
Italian Albums (FIMI)	100

=== Decade-end charts ===
Bad Blood
Chart (2010–2019)	Position
UK Albums (OCC)	55
US Top Rock Albums (Billboard)	36

== Certifications and sales ==
Bad Blood
Region	Certification	Certified units/sales
Australia (ARIA)	Gold	35,000^{^}
Austria (IFPI Austria)	Platinum	15,000^{*}
Belgium (BRMA)	Gold	15,000^{*}
Canada (Music Canada)	Gold	40,000^{^}
Germany (BVMI)	Platinum	200,000^{^}
Ireland (IRMA)	Gold	7,500^{^}
Italy (FIMI)	Gold	25,000^{‡}
Poland (ZPAV)	Platinum	20,000^{‡}
Singapore (RIAS)	Gold	5,000^{*}
Sweden (GLF)	Gold	20,000^{‡}
United Kingdom (BPI)	3× Platinum	1,065,681
United States (RIAA)	Platinum	1,000,000^{‡}
^{*} Sales figures based on certification alone.^{^} Shipments figures based on certification alone.^{‡} Sales+streaming figures based on certification alone.

All This Bad Blood
Region	Certification	Certified units/sales
Denmark (IFPI Danmark)	Platinum	20,000^{‡}
Netherlands (NVPI)	Gold	25,000^{^}
New Zealand (RMNZ)	2× Platinum	30,000^{‡}
^{^} Shipments figures based on certification alone.^{‡} Sales+streaming figures based on certification alone.

== Release history ==
Bad Blood
Region	Date	Format	Label
United Kingdom	4 March 2013	CD, DD, LP	Virgin Records
Canada	16 April 2013	CD, DD	Virgin Records
Japan	17 July 2013	DD	Virgin Records
United States	3 September 2013	CD, DD, LP	Virgin Records
Worldwide	4 March – 3 September 2013	CD, DD	Virgin, Universal, Nokia

All This Bad Blood
Region	Date	Format	Label
United Kingdom	25 November 2013	CD, DD	Virgin EMI Records
European Union	25 November 2013	CD, DD	Virgin EMI Records
Poland	26 November 2013	CD, DD	Universal Music Group
Italy	26 November 2013	CD, DD	Virgin EMI Records
Spain	26 November 2013	CD, DD	Virgin EMI Records
India	4 December 2013	CD, DD	Capitol Music, Virgin EMI Records
Canada	10 December 2013	CD, DD	Universal Music Group, Virgin Records
United States	14 January 2014	DD	Virgin Records
Mexico	18 February 2014	CD, DD	Virgin EMI Records
Germany	12 March 2014	CD, DD	Universal Music Group
Brazil	28 March 2014	CD, DD	Universal Music Group
United States	22 April 2014	CD	Virgin Records
Worldwide	25 November – 22 April 2014	CD, DD	Virgin EMI, Universal, Virgin, EMI, Capitol
