= Torn Apart (Bastille song) =

Single by Bastille featuring Grades

from the album VS. (Other People's Heartache, Pt.III)
- Released: 30 November 2014
- Recorded: 2014
- Genre: Indie pop
- Length: 3:05
- Label: Virgin
- Songwriters: Dan Smith; Daniel Traynor
- Producers: Dan Smith; Grades

Bastille singles chronology
"Oblivion" (2014)	"Torn Apart" (2014)	"Good Grief" (2016)

"Torn Apart" is a song by English band Bastille and producer Grades. It is track number 6 on Bastille's VS. (Other People's Heartache, Pt. III) mixtape.

== Background ==
On 21 October 2014, Bastille announced their third mixtape, VS. (Other People's Heartache, Pt.III), with the release of their song "Torn Apart", featuring the artist Grades and on Zane Lowe's Radio 1 show. VS. (Other People's Heartache, Pt.III) was released on 8 December 2014.

An alternate version, titled "Torn Apart, Pt. II" features American rapper and singer Lizzo.

The song was produced by a London-based producer Grades. The song was released as a single promoting the mixtape on 30 November 2014.

== Video ==
The video for "Torn Apart" was uploaded on YouTube on 21 November 2014.

== Chart performance ==
=== Weekly charts ===
Chart (2014–15)	Peak position
Belgium (Ultratop 50 Flanders)	54
UK Singles (Official Charts)	196
