= Flaws (song) =

2011 single by Bastille

Single by Bastille

from the album Bad Blood
- A-side: "Flaws" (2011)
- B-side: "Durban Skies" (2012)
- Released: 4 July 2011; 21 October 2012; 3 March 2014
- Recorded: 2011
- Genre: Synth-pop
- Length: 3:37
- Label: Young and Lost Club; Virgin
- Songwriter(s): Dan Smith
- Producer(s): Dan Smith; Mark Crew

Bastille singles chronology
"Flaws" / "Icarus" (2011)	"Overjoyed" (2012)
"Bad Blood" (2012)	"Flaws" (2012)	"Pompeii" (2013)
Of the Night (2013)	Flaws (2014)	Pompeii / Waiting All Night (2014)

Music video
- "Bastille - Flaws (Official Music Video)" on YouTube

"Flaws" is the debut single by British band Bastille, first released in 2011 through the independent label Young and Lost Club as a double A-side 7-inch single with their song "Icarus". The single was later re-released through Virgin Records as a digital download on 21 October 2012, featuring remixes and new B-side track "Durban Skies", peaking at number 21 on the UK Singles Chart on this occasion. "Flaws" was released for a third time on 3 March 2014, but did not improve upon its previous peak.

== Composition ==
"Flaws" makes extensive use of compound quadruple meter (12/8 time).

== Music video ==
Two music videos have been produced. The first accompanied the 2012 release of "Flaws" and was first released onto YouTube on 12 September 2012 at a total length of three minutes and forty-one seconds. A second video released in 2014 for the single's re-release documents the band's experiences of 2013 via a video montage of several of their performances.

== Track listing ==
Digital download

1. "Flaws" – 3:37
2. "Durban Skies" – 4:11
3. "Flaws" (Cinematic's in My Soul Remix) – 4:29
4. "Flaws" (Live from The Scala) – 3:45
5. "Flaws" (music video) – 3:41

== Charts ==
=== Weekly charts ===
Chart (2012–14)	Peak position
Belgium (Ultratip Bubbling Under Flanders)	7
Canada Rock (Billboard)	32
Scotland (OCC)	22
UK Singles (OCC)	21
US Bubbling Under Hot 100 Singles (Billboard)	22
US Adult Alternative Songs (Billboard)	16
US Alternative Airplay (Billboard)	5
US Dance Club Songs (Billboard)	24
US Hot Rock & Alternative Songs (Billboard)	14
US Rock Airplay (Billboard)	7

=== Year-end charts ===
Chart (2014)	Position
US Alternative Songs (Billboard)	28
US Hot Rock Songs (Billboard)	55
US Rock Airplay (Billboard)	39

== Certifications ==
Region	Certification	Certified units/sales
United Kingdom (BPI)	Gold	400,000^{‡}
United States (RIAA)	Gold	500,000^{‡}
^{‡} Sales+streaming figures based on certification alone.

== Release history ==
Region	Date	Format	Label
United Kingdom	4 July 2011	7" vinyl	Young and Lost Club
United Kingdom	21 October 2012	Digital download	Virgin Records
Italy	14 March 2014	Contemporary hit radio	Virgin Records
United States	8 July 2014	Modern rock radio	Virgin Records
United States	11 August 2014	Adult album alternative radio	Virgin Records
United States	9 September 2014	Contemporary hit radio	Virgin Records
