= Overjoyed (Bastille song) =

Single by Bastille

from the album Bad Blood
- B-side: "Sleepsong"
- Released: 27 April 2012
- Recorded: 2011
- Genre: Indie pop; synthpop
- Length: 3:24
- Label: Virgin
- Songwriter(s): Dan Smith
- Producer(s): Dan Smith, Mark Crew

Bastille singles chronology
"Flaws" / "Icarus" (2011)	"Overjoyed" (2012)	"Bad Blood" (2012)

Music video
- "Overjoyed" on YouTube

"Overjoyed" is a song by the British band Bastille. Released on 27 April 2012, it was the band's first single release through Virgin Records. It was the first single to be taken from their first studio album, Bad Blood. The track was also included in both their 2011 self-released recording, the Laura Palmer EP, and the 2013 US-only release, the Haunt. Due to little promotion, the track failed to chart in the United Kingdom, the only non-charting single from the album.

== Music video ==
The music video was released onto YouTube on 3 November 2011. It was directed by Courtney Phillips and is a length of three minutes and forty-five seconds. It is the band's first music video and, like the extended play the song was originally featured on, it is said to be heavily inspired by the television series Twin Peaks. It shows a girl, possibly representing the character Laura Palmer from the series, who leaves her room with a book and walks through the streets at night to go to a forest where she buries the book. She is also seen several times throughout the video standing near a lake in the forest (as seen in the single cover).

Following its premiere, the music publication Q introduced the track as its "Track of the Day" for 7 March 2012.

There are alternative videos of the band performing the song live at the Copped Hall. The Distance remix was also given a video.

== Track listing ==
Digital download

1. "Overjoyed" – 3:24
2. "Sleepsong" – 3:40
3. "Overjoyed" (Yeasayer Remix) – 4:09
4. "Overjoyed" (Distance Remix) – 5:05
5. "Overjoyed" (Ghostwriter Remix) – 3:50
6. "Overjoyed" (Detour City Redux) – 4:14
7. "Overjoyed" (music video) – 3:43

== Charts ==
Chart (2013)	Peak position
UK Streaming (Official Streaming Chart)	29

== Release history ==
Region	Date	Format	Label
United Kingdom	27 April 2012	Digital download (remixes)	Virgin Records
United Kingdom	30 April 2012	7" vinyl	Virgin Records
