= Things We Lost in the Fire (song) =

Single by Bastille

from the album Bad Blood
- B-side: "Icarus"
- Released: 23 August 2013
- Recorded: 2011
- Genre: Indie pop
- Length: 4:01
- Label: Virgin
- Songwriter: Dan Smith
- Producers: Dan Smith, Mark Crew

Bastille singles chronology
"Laura Palmer" (2013)	"Things We Lost in the Fire" (2013)	"Oblivion" (2013)

Music video
- "Bastille - Things We Lost In The Fire (Official Music Video)" on YouTube

"Things We Lost in the Fire" is the sixth single by British band Bastille from their debut studio album Bad Blood. The song was released as a 7-inch single and as a digital download on 23 August 2013. It received radio airplay on both BBC Radio 1 and BBC Radio 2, two of the most popular British national stations. It reached number 28 in the UK Singles Chart on 15 September 2013.

The song was featured in an episode of The Vampire Diaries and was used as the name of a Grey's Anatomy episode in 2015.

== Music video ==
A music video to accompany the release of "Things We Lost in the Fire" was shot in Kėdainiai in Lithuania. It was directed by Naor Aloni, and released on 13 July 2013.

== In popular culture ==
The song was featured in episode 22 of season 4 "The Walking Dead" of The Vampire Diaries. In September 2014 the song was used as a trailer song for EastEnders. It was also used as the name of Grey's Anatomy season 12 episode 8 "Things We Lost in the Fire" in 2015.

== Track listing ==
Digital download

1. "Things We Lost in the Fire" – 4:00
2. "Icarus" – 3:14
3. "Things We Lost in the Fire" (TORN Remix) – 5:23
4. "Things We Lost in the Fire" (Tyde Remix) – 4:50
5. "Things We Lost in the Fire" (music video) – 4:15
6. "Things We Lost in the Fire" (Live from Queens' College, Cambridge) (music video) – 4:06

7" single

1. "Things We Lost in the Fire" – 4:00
2. "Icarus" (Live from Queens' College, Cambridge) – 3:14

== Charts ==
=== Weekly charts ===
Chart (2013–2014)	Peak position
Austria (Ö3 Austria Top 40)	18
Belgium (Ultratop 50 Flanders)	10
Belgium (Ultratip Bubbling Under Wallonia)	16
Czech Republic Airplay (ČNS IFPI)	10
Czech Republic Singles Digital (ČNS IFPI)	86
France (SNEP)	68
Germany (GfK)	18
Ireland (IRMA)	33
Netherlands (Single Top 100)	57
New Zealand (Recorded Music NZ)	19
Poland Airplay (ZPAV)	3
Scotland Singles (Official Charts)	29
Slovakia Airplay (ČNS IFPI)	1
Slovenia (SloTop50)	49
Switzerland (Schweizer Hitparade)	53
UK Singles (Official Charts)	28
US Hot Rock & Alternative Songs (Billboard)	46

=== Year-end charts ===
Chart (2013)	Position
Germany (Media Control AG)	82
Poland (ZPAV)	15
Chart (2014)	Position
Belgium (Ultratop Flanders)	58

== Certifications ==
Region	Certification	Certified units/sales
Austria (IFPI Austria)	Gold	15,000^{*}
Germany (BVMI)	Gold	150,000^{‡}
New Zealand (RMNZ)	Gold	7,500^{*}
United Kingdom (BPI)	Platinum	600,000^{‡}
^{*} Sales figures based on certification alone.^{‡} Sales+streaming figures based on certification alone.

== Release history ==
Region	Date	Format	Label
United Kingdom	23 August 2013	Digital download	Virgin Records
United Kingdom	26 August 2013	7-inch vinyl	Virgin Records
Italy	9 September 2013	Contemporary hit radio	Universal Music
