= Wild World (Bastille album) =

2016 studio album by Bastille

Studio album by Bastille
- Released: 9 September 2016
- Recorded: 2014–2016
- Genre: Alternative rock; pop rock; synth-pop; arena rock; EDM-pop
- Length: 49:38
- Label: Virgin EMI
- Producer: Dan Smith; Mark Crew

Bastille chronology
VS. (Other People's Heartache, Pt. III) (2014)	Wild World (2016)	Other People's Heartache, Pt. 4 (2018)

Singles from Wild World
- 1. "Good Grief" Released: 16 June 2016; 2. "Send Them Off!" Released: 30 September 2016; 3. "Blame" Released: 15 December 2016; 4. "Glory" Released: 5 June 2017

Wild World is the second studio album by English indie pop band Bastille, released on 9 September 2016 by Virgin EMI Records. The album was co-produced by Mark Crew. The lead single, "Good Grief", was released on 16 June 2016. The song "Send Them Off!" is featured on the soundtrack of the game FIFA 17. The cover photograph was taken at 30 Park Place in Downtown, New York City.

== Critical reception ==
Professional ratings
Aggregate scores
Source	Rating
Metacritic	73/100
Review scores
Source	Rating
AllMusic	4/5 stars
Clash	7/10
DIY	4/5 stars
Entertainment Weekly	B
The Guardian	4/5 stars
musicOMH	3.5/5 stars
NME	4/5 stars
The Observer	3/5 stars
Q	4/5 stars
Rolling Stone	3/5 stars

Wild World received generally positive reviews, with Caroline Sullivan of The Guardian giving the album four out of five stars. On Metacritic, the album received a score of 73 out of 100, based on ten critics—which Metacritic classes as "generally favorable".

== Accolades ==
Accolades for Wild World
Publication	Accolade	Year	Award
NME	NME's Albums of the Year 2016	2016	No. 31 Album of the Year
NME	NME Awards 2017	2017	Best Album

== Track listing ==
On 15 August 2016, Bastille used Snapchat to reveal the track names of the 19 tracks on the Complete Edition via Snapchat geofilters planted at significant sites around the globe.

All songs were written by Dan Smith and produced by Smith and Mark Crew.

Standard edition
No.	Title	Length
1.	"Good Grief"	3:26
2.	"The Currents"	3:24
3.	"An Act of Kindness"	3:28
4.	"Warmth"	3:49
5.	"Glory"	4:41
6.	"Power"	3:29
7.	"Two Evils"	2:46
8.	"Send Them Off!"	3:20
9.	"Lethargy"	3:24
10.	"Four Walls (The Ballad of Perry Smith)"	4:12
11.	"Blame"	2:55
12.	"Fake It"	4:04
13.	"Snakes"	3:17
14.	"Winter of Our Youth"	3:23
Total length:		49:38

Complete edition
No.	Title	Length
15.	"Way Beyond"	3:19
16.	"Oil On Water"	2:58
17.	"Campus"	3:03
18.	"Shame"	3:30
19.	"The Anchor"	3:24
Total length:		65:52

Japan edition and Target exclusive edition
No.	Title	Length
19.	"Final Hour"	3:08
20.	"The Anchor"	3:24
21.	"Send Them Off!" (Bunker Sessions)	3:17
Total length:		59:27

== Personnel ==
- Dan Smith – lead vocals, keyboards, piano, percussion, string arrangements, production, programming
- Kyle Simmons – keyboards
- Will Farquarson – bass guitar, acoustic guitar, electric guitar
- Chris "Woody" Wood – drums, percussion on "Glory" and "Send Them Off!"
- Tinashe Fazakerley – additional backing vocals
- Rory Graham – additional backing vocals

== Charts ==
=== Weekly charts ===
Weekly chart performance for Wild World
Chart (2016)	Peak position
Australian Albums (ARIA)	7
Austrian Albums (Ö3 Austria)	5
Belgian Albums (Ultratop Flanders)	2
Belgian Albums (Ultratop Wallonia)	14
Canadian Albums (Billboard)	7
Danish Albums (Hitlisten)	38
Dutch Albums (Album Top 100)	4
Finnish Albums (Suomen virallinen lista)	13
French Albums (SNEP)	54
German Albums (Offizielle Top 100)	6
Greek Albums (IFPI)	50
Hungarian Albums (MAHASZ)	36
Irish Albums (IRMA)	2
Italian Albums (FIMI)	9
New Zealand Albums (RMNZ)	12
Norwegian Albums (VG-lista)	14
Polish Albums (ZPAV)	7
Portuguese Albums (AFP)	16
Scottish Albums (OCC)	1
Spanish Albums (PROMUSICAE)	25
Swedish Albums (Sverigetopplistan)	32
Swiss Albums (Schweizer Hitparade)	5
UK Albums (OCC)	1
US Billboard 200	4
US Top Alternative Albums (Billboard)	2
US Top Rock Albums (Billboard)	2

=== Year-end charts ===
2016 year-end chart performance for Wild World
Chart (2016)	Position
Belgian Albums (Ultratop Flanders)	37
Dutch Albums (Album Top 100)	89
UK Albums (OCC)	50
US Top Alternative Albums (Billboard)	40
US Top Rock Albums (Billboard)	60

2017 year-end chart performance for Wild World
Chart (2017)	Position
Belgian Albums (Ultratop Flanders)	175

== Certifications ==
Certifications for Wild World
Region	Certification	Certified units/sales
United Kingdom (BPI)	Gold	227,836
