= Pompeii (song) =

2013 single by Bastille

Single by Bastille

from the album Bad Blood
- B-side: "Poet"
- Released: 11 January 2013
- Recorded: 2012
- Genre: Alternative rock; synth-rock; power pop
- Length: 3:34
- Label: Virgin
- Songwriter: Dan Smith
- Producers: Dan Smith; Mark Crew

Bastille singles chronology
"Flaws" (2012)	"Pompeii" (2013)	"Laura Palmer" (2013)

Music video
- "Bastille - Pompeii (Official Music Video)" on YouTube

"Pompeii" is a song by British indie pop band Bastille. It is the fourth single from their debut studio album Bad Blood and was released on 11 January 2013. The song's title and lyrics refer to the Roman town of the same name that was destroyed and buried in the eruption of Mount Vesuvius in AD 79.

"Pompeii" became the band's breakthrough hit, peaking at number two on the UK Singles Chart and became the eleventh best-selling song that year and, until June 2014, was the country's most streamed single of all time. It was also successful worldwide, reaching the top ten in fifteen countries, including the United States where it peaked at number five on the Billboard Hot 100, becoming Bastille's most successful single to date, until "Happier" reached number two on both the UK and US charts in October 2018 and February 2019 respectively.

The song was nominated for British Single of the Year at the 2014 BRIT Awards. A mashup of the song with Rudimental and Ella Eyre's "Waiting All Night" was performed live by Rudimental, Eyre and Bastille at the aforementioned ceremony, which reached number 21 in the UK.

It was also performed at the 2014 iHeartRadio Music Awards, where it was nominated for Alternative Rock Song of the Year.

== Composition ==
The song has a tempo of 127.5 beats per minute and is written in the key of A major with a chord progression of D-A-F♯m-E. According to Dan Smith, the song is written as a conversation between two victims of the eruption of Mount Vesuvius, stating in an interview, "I was reading a book that had some picture of the people who got caught up in the volcanic eruption. And it's just such a kind of dark powerful image, and it got me thinking about how boring it must have been emotionally after the event. To be sort of stuck in that same position for hundreds and hundreds of years. So, the song is sort of an imaginary conversation between these two people who are stuck next to each other in their sort of tragic death pose."

== Music video ==
The official music video was filmed in Los Angeles and Palm Springs, California. It was directed by Jesse John Jenkins and produced by Tova Dann. The video was first released onto YouTube on 20 January 2013 at a total length of three minutes and fifty-two seconds.

The video follows Bastille frontman Dan Smith, as he wanders about an empty-looking Los Angeles, before realizing the few people around all have unnatural vacant black eyes. He steals a car and drives into the desert to escape them, but the car breaks down and he soon realizes he has been infected as well. He climbs a mountain and looks out at the view, before turning around to reveal his own eyes have turned black as well. The story is an allegory for the Eruption of Mount Vesuvius in 79 AD in Pompeii.

== Track listing ==
Digital download

1. "Pompeii" – 3:34
2. "Poet" – 2:44
3. "Pompeii" (Tyde Remix) – 4:22
4. "Pompeii" (Monsieur Adi Remix) – 4:23
5. "Pompeii" (Kat Krazy Remix) – 3:37
6. "Pompeii" (Audien Remix) – 4:52

7" vinyl single

1. "Pompeii" – 3:34
2. "Poet" – 2:44

CD single

1. "Pompeii" – 3:34
2. "Pompeii" (Kat Krazy Remix) – 3:36

BRITs performance digital download

1. "Pompeii/Waiting All Night" (with Rudimental featuring Ella Eyre) – 5:47

== Reception ==
=== Critical reception ===
For Pitchfork, Amy Phillips named "Pompeii" among her favourite songs of 2013, praising its composition: "...backing vocals that ring out both ominous and joyful, the kind of chorus that feels like the sun breaking through a thunderstorm." In contrast, NME had a more mixed review, with Lucy Jones observing "juddering keyboard parts ripped directly from New Order's 'Temptation'" while acknowledging the song was "not horrible". The Guardian's Dorian Lynskey later described "Pompeii" as "one of the biggest songs of the decade", stating that it has "less in common with the self-mythologising narcissism of modern pop than with 80s oddities such as OMD's 'Enola Gay' or Ultravox's 'Vienna'."

=== Commercial performance ===
The song reached number one in Scotland and Ireland, and peaked at number two in Italy and the UK. Previously, the single also held the record (now belonging to Clean Bandit's "Rather Be") for the longest time at number one on the Official Streaming Chart, remaining at the peak for seven weeks, and was the second most streamed track of 2013 in the UK. "Pompeii" spent the anniversary of its debut at number 30, having re-entered the top 40 the previous week following a live performance (a mash-up with Rudimental's "Waiting All Night") at the 2014 BRIT Awards. It spent a record 92 consecutive weeks in the top 100 (since matched by "Happy" by Pharrell Williams). With over 26 million streams by June 2014, "Pompeii" became the most streamed song of all time in the UK at that time and has sold 895,000 copies there. The B-side track "Poet" has also managed to chart in the UK at #121.

The song reached number one on the Billboard Alternative Songs chart in October 2013 and began climbing the Billboard Hot 100 chart. It peaked at number 5 in the Hot 100 in March 2014 and reached a million in sales in the US. By March 2014, the song had reached top 5 in the Hot 100 in its 29th week, and has sold over two million digital copies. By the end of its US run, Pompeii had managed to chart for a total of 53 weeks in the top 100 as well as sell 3 million digital sales mark by June 2014. As of December 2014, the song has sold 3.4 million copies in the US.

In September 2023, for the 35th anniversary of Alternative Songs (which by then had been renamed Alternative Airplay), Billboard published a list of the top 100 most successful songs in the chart's history; "Pompeii" was ranked at number 48.

=== Grammy Award nomination ===
A dance remix of the track by Audien was nominated for Best Remixed Recording, Non-Classic at the 57th Annual Grammy Awards. It lost to Tiësto's remix of John Legend's "All of Me".

== Credits and personnel ==
Credits adapted from Bad Blood.

- Backing vocals – Ralph Pelleymounter, Jon Willoughby, Ian Dudfield, Josh Platman, Alex Martinez
- Bass – William Farquarson
- Drums – Chris "Woody" Wood
- Mastering – Bob Ludwig
- Mixing – Mark 'Spike' Stent, Matty Green (add.)
- Recording – Mark Crew
- Producer, programming, keyboards – Mark Crew, Kyle Simmons
- Writer, vocals, piano – Dan Smith
- Label – Virgin Records

== Cover versions ==
Belgian singer Heleen Uytterhoeven recorded a cover version in Latin, the language spoken in Pompeii, the namesake of the song. Bustle magazine noted that the YouTube video contained commenters arguing in Latin over the accuracy of her translation.

In 2023, to celebrate the 10th anniversary of the song, Bastille collaborated with German composer Hans Zimmer to produce Pompeii MMXXIII, an orchestral re-arrangement of the original song.

== Charts ==
=== Weekly charts ===
Weekly chart performance for "Pompeii"
Chart (2013–2014)	Peak position
Australia (ARIA)	4
Austria (Ö3 Austria Top 40)	3
Belgium (Ultratop 50 Flanders)	3
Belgium (Ultratop 50 Wallonia)	35
Brazil (Billboard Brasil Hot 100)	34
Brazil Hot Pop Songs	13
Canada Hot 100 (Billboard)	6
Canada AC (Billboard)	2
Canada CHR/Top 40 (Billboard)	5
Canada Hot AC (Billboard)	2
Canada Rock (Billboard)	15
Czech Republic Airplay (ČNS IFPI)	6
Czech Republic Singles Digital (ČNS IFPI)	30
Denmark (Tracklisten)	21
Euro Digital Song Sales (Billboard)	5
France (SNEP)	96
Germany (GfK)	6
Hungary (Editors' Choice Top 40)	34
Ireland (IRMA)	1
Ireland (IRMA) "Pompeii/Waiting All Night"	42
Israel International Airplay (Media Forest)	4
Italy (FIMI)	2
Italy Airplay (EarOne)	1
Japan Hot 100 (Billboard)	41
Luxembourg Digital Song Sales (Billboard)	6
Mexico (Billboard Mexican Airplay)	12
Mexico (Billboard Ingles Airplay)	2
Mexico Anglo (Monitor Latino)	4
Netherlands (Dutch Top 40)	14
Netherlands (Single Top 100)	18
New Zealand (Recorded Music NZ)	8
Norway (VG-lista)	13
Poland Airplay (ZPAV)	4
Romania (Airplay 100)	59
Scottish Singles Sales (Official Charts)	1
Scottish Singles Sales (Official Charts) "Pompeii/Waiting All Night"	24
Slovakia Airplay (ČNS IFPI)	13
Slovakia Singles Digital (ČNS IFPI)	80
Slovenia (SloTop50)	36
South Africa (EMA)	8
Spain (Promusicae)	94
Sweden (Sverigetopplistan)	6
Switzerland (Schweizer Hitparade)	5
UK Singles (Official Charts)	2
UK Singles (Official Charts) "Pompeii/Waiting All Night"	21
US Billboard Hot 100	5
US Adult Contemporary (Billboard)	11
US Adult Pop Airplay (Billboard)	2
US Dance Club Songs (Billboard)	1
US Dance Airplay (Billboard)	3
US Hot Rock & Alternative Songs (Billboard)	1
US Pop Airplay (Billboard)	3
US Rock & Alternative Airplay (Billboard)	1

=== Year-end charts ===
Annual chart rankings for "Pompeii"
Chart (2013)	Position
Australia (ARIA)	15
Austria (Ö3 Austria Top 40)	37
Belgium (Ultratop Flanders)	10
Brazil (Crowley)	200
Germany (Media Control AG)	29
Ireland (IRMA)	6
Italy (FIMI)	10
Italian Airplay (EarOne)	6
Netherlands (Dutch Top 40)	70
Netherlands (Single Top 100)	54
New Zealand (Recorded Music NZ)	25
Sweden (Sverigetopplistan)	19
Switzerland (Schweizer Hitparade)	44
UK Singles (Official Charts Company)	11
US Hot Rock Songs (Billboard)	25
US Rock Airplay (Billboard)	16

Chart (2014)	Position
Brazil (Crowley)	50
Canada (Canadian Hot 100)	14
Italy (FIMI)	78
Netherlands (Single Top 100)	75
Sweden (Sverigetopplistan)	73
UK Singles (Official Charts Company)	79
US Billboard Hot 100	12
US Adult Contemporary (Billboard)	25
US Adult Top 40 (Billboard)	2
US Dance Club Songs (Billboard)	30
US Dance/Mix Show Airplay (Billboard)	14
US Mainstream Top 40 (Billboard)	11
US Hot Rock Songs (Billboard)	1
US Rock Airplay (Billboard)	6

Chart (2016)	Position
Brazil (Brasil Hot 100)	50

=== Decade-end charts ===
2010s chart rankings for "Pompeii"
Chart (2010–2019)	Position
UK Singles (Official Charts Company)	21
US Hot Rock Songs (Billboard)	11

== Certifications ==
Region	Certification	Certified units/sales
Australia (ARIA)	9× Platinum	630,000^{‡}
Austria (IFPI Austria)	3× Platinum	90,000^{*}
Belgium (BRMA)	2× Platinum	40,000^{‡}
Brazil (Pro-Música Brasil)	2× Diamond	500,000^{‡}
Canada (Music Canada)	3× Platinum	240,000^{*}
Denmark (IFPI Danmark)	3× Platinum	270,000^{‡}
Germany (BVMI)	5× Gold	750,000^{‡}
Italy (FIMI)	3× Platinum	90,000^{‡}
Mexico (AMPROFON)	Platinum	60,000^{*}
New Zealand (RMNZ)	6× Platinum	180,000^{‡}
Spain (Promusicae)	2× Platinum	120,000^{‡}
Sweden (GLF)	7× Platinum	280,000^{‡}
Switzerland (IFPI Switzerland)	Gold	15,000^{^}
United Kingdom (BPI)	7× Platinum	4,200,000^{‡}
United States (RIAA)	6× Platinum	6,000,000^{‡}
Streaming
Denmark (IFPI Danmark)	2× Platinum	3,600,000^{†}
Spain (Promusicae)	Gold	4,000,000^{†}
^{*} Sales figures based on certification alone.^{^} Shipments figures based on certification alone.^{‡} Sales+streaming figures based on certification alone.^{†} Streaming-only figures based on certification alone.

== Release history ==
Region	Date	Format	Label
Italy	5 March 2013	Contemporary hit radio	EMI
United Kingdom	5 February 2013	Digital download	Virgin
United Kingdom	5 February 2013	7"	Virgin
United States	25 June 2013	Modern rock radio	Virgin; Capitol
Germany	5 July 2013	CD	Virgin
United States	9 September 2013	Adult album alternative radio	Virgin; Capitol
United States	15 October 2013	Contemporary hit radio	Virgin; Capitol
United States	29 October 2013	Hot adult contemporary radio	Virgin; Capitol
United Kingdom	19 February 2014	Digital download ("Pompeii/Waiting All Night")	Brit Awards Ltd.
United Kingdom	31 March 2014	Digital download (Audien remix)	Virgin
United States	31 March 2014	Digital download (Audien remix)	Virgin

== See also ==
- List of number-one dance singles of 2014 (U.S.)
