= List of songs recorded by Mumford & Sons =

This is a comprehensive list of songs recorded or performed by British rock band Mumford & Sons. Since forming in late 2007, the band have released six studio albums, three live albums, six studio extended plays (three collaborations), seven live extended plays and twenty-two singles. This list contains unreleased songs and cover versions played by the band.

== Original songs ==
Title	Album(s) / EP(s) / single(s)	First released	Notes
"42"	Delta	2018	Working titles included "See a Sign".
"After All"	—	—	Song title pictured on a whiteboard in the studio for Delta. The song has never been heard.
"After The Storm"	Sigh No More	2009	
"Alleycat"	Prizefighter	2026	
"Anchor"	Rushmere	2025	
"Awake My Soul"	Mumford & Sons / Sigh No More	2008	First recording released on Mumford & Sons. Later re-recorded and released on Sigh No More.
"Babel"	Babel / Babel - Single	2012	Released as fourth single from Babel.
"Badlands"	Prizefighter	2026	Studio version featuring Gracie Abrams
"Begin Again"	Prizefighter	2026	
"Believe"	Believe - Single / Wilder Mind	2015	Released as lead single from Wilder Mind.
"Beloved"	Delta / Beloved - Single	2018	Working titles included "Silver Hair". Yebba on backing vocals. Released as second single from Delta.
"Below My Feet"	Babel	2012	
"Blind Leading the Blind"	Blind Leading The Blind - Single	2018	The song was played live from October 2016 but was included on 'Delta' despite orchestral elements having been recorded during the album's production. The song was finished and released as a standalone single in October 2019. The single version removes the introduction and first verse that are still included when performed live. The last Mumford & Sons release as a four-piece.
"Blood On The Page"	Rushmere	2025	Studio version featuring Madison Cunningham
"Broad-Shouldered Beasts"	Wilder Mind	2015	
"Broken Crown"	Babel	2012	New version of previous B-side to "Little Lion Man", "To Darkness".
"Caroline"	Rushmere	2025	Released as third single from Rushmere.
"Carry On"	Rushmere	2025	
"Chaos"	—	—	Song title pictured on a whiteboard in the studio for Delta. The song has never been heard.
"Clover"	Prizefighter	2026	
"Cold Arms"	Wilder Mind	2015	The track features vocals from Marcus Mumford and lone electric guitar from Winston Marshall. The band experimented with extra instrumentation in the recording process but decided to keep the song's stripped-back nature. Marshall said of the track, "We may never play this one live" but in June 2015 the band began performing the song acoustically with Ted Dwane, Ben Lovett and Marshall providing backing vocals.
"Conversation With My Son (Gangsters & Angels)"	Prizefighter	2026	
"Crimson"	—	—	Song title pictured on a whiteboard in the studio for Delta. The song has never been heard.
"Darkness Visible"	Delta	2018	A near-instrumental track, it is band's first to feature spoken word lyrics, which are provided by Gill Landry.
"Delta"	Delta	2018	The song began as two separate demos, the first titled "Walk With Me", that were later combined.
"Ditmas"	Wilder Mind / Ditmas - Single	2015	Released as third single from Wilder Mind.
"Drunk"	—	—	Song title pictured on a whiteboard in the studio for Delta. The song has never been heard.
"Dust Bowl Dance"	Sigh No More	2009	When played live, an instrumental interlude opens the song.
"Feel The Tide"	Love Your Ground	2008	Written before SNM release, didn't make album but still played live.
"Fool You've Landed"	Johannesburg	2016	Collaboration with The Very Best and Beatenberg. One of only two songs with lead vocals provided by Marshall. Originally a demo for Wilder Mind that did not make the cut, Mumford said of the track, "It became a whole different thing to what it was before. There was like a verse idea and a chorus idea that feature on this song, but then Esau from the Very Best really embraced the verse, and wrote it basically in the studio."
"Forever"	Delta / Forever (Garage Version) - Single	2018	The first electric song that the band laid to tape for Wilder Mind; Mumford described the song as "the gateway drug to the rest of the record ...We took what Forever had done and worked with that". The song did not make the cut for Wilder Mind as it was technically a road-written song and "didn’t quite fit sound-wise, style-wise". The song was first heard when played live in May 2016, printed on the setlist as FOREVER (THE PARACHUTE SONG). The song was revisited in the recording of Delta and realised as a piano-led ballad. A third 'acoustic version' was performed on the Delta Tour. The original 'garage version' from 2014 was released as a standalone single in May 2020.
"For Those Below"	Babel	2012	Released as bonus-track on Deluxe Edition of Babel. One of only two songs with lead vocals provided by Marshall.
"Ghosts That We Knew"	Babel	2012	
"Guiding Light"	Guiding Light - Single / Delta	2018	Released as the lead single from Delta. When performed acoustically, an outro verse is added.
"Here"	Prizefighter	2026	Studio version featuring Chris Stapleton
"Hold On To What You Believe"	Love Your Ground / Sigh No More / Winter Winds - Single	2008	First recording released on Love Your Ground. Later re-recorded and released as bonus-track on Deluxe Edition of Sigh No More as well as the B-side to "Winter Winds". The Love Your Ground recording features backing vocals from Laura Marling. Only one live performance video exists.
"Holland Road"	Babel	2012	
"Home"	—	—	The song was written as an unused contribution to the soundtrack of 2011 film adaption of Wuthering Heights. "Home" was only played live in June 2011 and was never officially released by the band, however the recording of KBCO Radio live session was widely shared online. The chorus of "Home" had previously been heard as part of an impromptu jam dubbed "Meet Me Tomorrow" that featured in the band's documentary film Big Easy Express, filmed in April 2011. In November 2014, the song was included on collaboration album Idris Elba presents mi Mandela with an instrumental contribution by Mumford & Sons and vocals by Maverick Sabre.
"Hopeless Wanderer"	Babel / Hopeless Wanderer - Single	2012	Released as fifth single from Babel. First performed live in 2011, the song underwent structural changes in the recording studio for Babel.
"Hot Gates"	Wilder Mind	2015	
"Icarus"	Prizefighter	2026	Studio version featuring Gigi Perez
"If I Say"	Delta	2018	Released as a promotional single from Delta. The band's first song to contain orchestral elements.
"If This Is Love"	Believe - Single	2015	Only released as B-side to "Believe" in Wilder Mind 7" Collector's Box.
"I Gave You All"	Sigh No More	2009	
"I Take Your Hand"	The Wedding Band - The First Dance	2010	Released under the moniker 'The Wedding Band'. Collaboration with Nick Etwell, Callum Lindsay, Jesse Quin, Adam Stockdale and David Williamson.
"I Will Wait"	I Will Wait - Single / Babel	2012	New version of previous B-side to "The Cave", "Untitled (Nothing is Written)". Released as first single from Babel.
"I'll Tell You Everything"	Prizefighter	2026	
"In the Water"	—	—	Song title pictured on a whiteboard in the studio for Delta. The song has never been heard.
"I Won't Be Alright"	—	—	Song title pictured on a whiteboard in the Wilder Mind recording studio. The song has never been heard.
"Just Smoke"	Wilder Mind / Just Smoke - Single	2015	Released as fifth single from Wilder Mind.
"Liar"	Mumford & Sons	2008	A video of Marcus Mumford performing the song solo whilst supporting Laura Marling in April 2008 shows an extra verse to the recorded version.
"Like You Wanted"	—	—	Song title pictured on a whiteboard in the studio for Delta. The song has never been heard.
"Little Lion Man"	Love Your Ground / Little Lion Man - Single / Sigh No More	2008	First recording released on Love Your Ground. Later re-recorded and released as lead-single from Sigh No More.
"Lover of the Light"	Babel / Lover of the Light - Single	2012	Released as second single from Babel.
"Lover's Eyes"	Babel	2012	Working titles included "Love Was Kind" and "I'll Walk Slow".
"Malibu"	Rushmere	2025	Released as second single from Rushmere.
"Maybe"	—	—	Played live twice in 2023 as an acoustic song around one mic. Not released officially, no studio version in circulation.
"Monochrome"	Rushmere	2025	
"Monster"	Wilder Mind	2015	
"Ngamila"	Johannesburg	2016	Collaboration with Baaba Maal and The Very Best. The only track from the EP not to have been performed live.
"Not With Haste"	Babel	2012	New version of song Learn Me Right, a previous collaboration with Birdy on soundtrack to Pixar film Brave.
"October Skies"	Delta	2018	Yebba features uncredited on backing vocals.
"Only Love"	Wilder Mind	2015	
"Picture You"	Delta	2018	
"Prizefighter"	Prizefighter	2025	Released as second single for Prizefighter in 2025
"Reminder"	Babel	2012	First performed live at three shows in June 2011, as an uptempo blues song with Mumford on drums, Dwane on blues guitar and Marshall playing double-bass. Printed as "Reminder" on setlists The song was re-arranged and shortened when recorded for Babel, featuring vocals from Mumford and lone acoustic guitar. When performed live after the release, Dwane, Lovett and Marshall provide backing vocals.
"Roll Away Your Stone"	Mumford & Sons / Sigh No More / Roll Away Your Stone - Single	2008	First recording released on Mumford & Sons. Later re-recorded and released as fourth single from Sigh No More. The song opens with a version of the Irish jig, "Merrily Kissed the Quaker". When played live, an extra instrumental section is played before the opening verse.
"Rose of Sharon"	Delta	2018	
"Rough Diamond"	—	—	Song title pictured on a whiteboard in the studio for Delta. The song has never been heard.
"Rubber Band Man"	Prizefighter	2025	Studio version featuring Hozier. Released as first single from Prizefighter in 2025.
"Run Together"	Prizefighter	2026	
"Rushmere"	Rushmere	2025	Released as first single from Rushmere.
"Save Me"	—	—	Song title pictured on a whiteboard in the studio for Delta. The song has never been heard.
"Shadow Of A Man"	Prizefighter	2026	
"She Said Yes"	The Wedding Band - The First Dance	2010	Released under the moniker 'The Wedding Band'. Collaboration with Nick Etwell, Callum Lindsay, Jesse Quin, Adam Stockdale and David Williamson.
"Sigh No More"	Sigh No More	2009	
"Sister"	Love Your Ground	2008	Hidden track on Love Your Ground. A re-recorded version was made available as a free download from the band's official website in late 2009.
"Si Tu Veux"	Johannesburg	2016	Collaboration with Baaba Maal and The Very Best. Lead vocals provided by Baaba Maal.
"Slip Away"	Delta	2018	
"Snake Eyes"	Wilder Mind	2015	
"So Nearly"	—	—	Song title pictured on a whiteboard in the Wilder Mind recording studio. The song has never been heard.
"Spring"	—	—	Song title pictured on a whiteboard in the studio for Delta. The song has never been heard.
"Stay"	Prizefighter	2026	
"Surrender"	Rushmere	2025	
"Susie"	The Wedding Band - The First Dance	2010	Released under the moniker 'The Wedding Band'. Collaboration with Nick Etwell, Callum Lindsay, Jesse Quin, Adam Stockdale and David Williamson.
"The Banjo Song"	Prizefighter	2026	Released as third single from Prizefighter. No relation to The Banjolin Song.
"The Banjolin Song"	Love Your Ground	2008	
"The Cave"	The Cave and the Open Sea / Sigh No More / The Cave - Single	2009	First recording released on The Cave and the Open Sea. Later re-recorded and released as third single from Sigh No More.
"The Enemy"	—	—	Contribution to the soundtrack of 2011 film adaption of Wuthering Heights. The song was never officially released, only through a snippet uploaded to the band's official YouTube channel, however the full recording from the film's end credits leaked in 2012.
"The Wild"	Delta	2018	
"The Wolf"	Wilder Mind / The Wolf - Single	2015	Released as second single from Wilder Mind.
"There Will Be Time"	There Will Be Time - Single / Johannesburg	2016	Collaboration with Baaba Maal recorded in summer 2014. The song was first released exclusively in South Africa in January 2016 after its live premiere in Cape Town, and become the band's first ever Number 1 single. The song was released worldwide on 7" vinyl for Record Store Day in April 2016 and later as lead single from Johannesburg.
"Thistle & Weeds"	Sigh No More	2009	When played live, an instrumental interlude opens the song.
"Thumper"	The Wedding Band - The First Dance	2010	Released under the moniker 'The Wedding Band'. Collaboration with Nick Etwell, Callum Lindsay, Jesse Quin, Adam Stockdale and David Williamson.
"Timshel"	Sigh No More	2009	
"To Darkness"	Little Lion Man - Single / Mumford & Sons, Laura Marling & Dharohar Project	2009	Released as B-side to "Little Lion Man". Later released as part of Mumford & Sons, Laura Marling & Dharohar Project, combined with the Dharohar Project song "Kripa".
"Tompkins Square Park"	Wilder Mind / Tompkins Square Park - Single	2015	Released as fourth single from Wilder Mind.
"Truth"	Rushmere	2025	Released on Rushmere Song title also pictured on a whiteboard in the studio for Delta. It is likely but uncertain if this refers to the same song.
"Untitled (Nothing Is Written)"	The Cave - Single	2010	Released as B-side to "The Cave" under the name "Untitled", however later referred to by the band as "Nothing is Written".
"Voices"	—	—	Played once live at St. Magnus Cathedral in Orkney on 11 March 2011. Before playing, Mumford commented "This song has no name", however the setlist listed the song as "Voices". The song was listed on the setlist the following night but was never played again, or released. Only one video of the song exists.
"Waiting For"	—	—	Song title pictured on a whiteboard in the studio for Delta. The song has never been heard.
"Where Are You Now"	Babel	2012	Released as bonus-track on Deluxe Edition of Babel.
"Where Is My Heart?"	—	—	Played live sparingly in 2009 and 2010, however never officially released. An improvised arrangement of the song was played during technical difficulty at Bern Festhalle in Switzerland in March 2013.
"Where It Belongs"	Rushmere	2025	
"Whispers In The Dark"	Babel / Whispers in the Dark - Single	2012	Released as third single from Babel. First performed live in 2009 with Mumford on electric guitar and Lovett on drums, the song was re-arranged when recorded for Babel.
"White Blank Page"	Mumford & Sons / Sigh No More	2008	
"Wilder Mind"	Wilder Mind	2015	
"Wild Heart"	Delta	2018	Released as the B-side to "Guiding Light" on the vinyl single.
"Winter Winds (My Head Told My Heart)"	The Cave and the Open Sea / Sigh No More / Winter Winds - Single	2009	First recording released on The Cave and the Open Sea under the title "My Head Told My Heart". Later re-recorded and released as second single from Sigh No More as "Winter Winds".
"Woman"	Woman - Single / Delta	2018	Released as the third single from Delta.
"Wona"	Johannesburg / Wona - Single	2016	Released as second single from Johannesburg. Collaboration with Baaba Maal, The Very Best and Beatenberg. Lead vocals provided by Beatenberg.

== Covers ==
Title	Original artist	Notes
"2Shy"	Shura	For BBC Radio 1 Live Lounge.
"All Along the Watchtower"	Bob Dylan	Jimi Hendrix version, performed live with Eddie Vedder at Ohana Festival, 30 Sept 2018. Also live with Portugal. The Man at USANA Amphitheatre 12 Aug 2019.
"Amazing Grace"	Traditional	Performed live with artists including Apache Relay, Jerry Douglas, Cadillac Sky, Old Crow Medicine Show, Punch Brothers and Abigail Washburn.
"Angel Band"	Traditional	Performed live with artists including Emmylou Harris, Jerry Douglas, Punch Brothers and Abigail Washburn.
"Angeline the Baker"	Stephen Foster	
"Atlantic City"	Bruce Springsteen	Performed live with artists including HAIM, Ben Howard, Johnny Flynn, Mystery Jets, The Flaming Lips, The Vaccines, The Maccabees, Jenny Lewis and Beans on Toast. Part of the Hootennany-set of the Railroad Revival Tour 2025.
"Baby Don't Do It"	Marvin Gaye	Performed live with Deap Vally and Jesse Quin.
"Blood"	The Middle East	Performed live with Gang of Youths on Delta Tour Europe Leg 1(16 times) and Delta Tour US&Mexico 2019(7 times).
"Come Thou Fount of Every Blessing"	Traditional	
"Come Together"	The Beatles	Performed live with artists including Rubblebucket, Gill Landry, Bear's Den and The Vaccines.
"Cousins"	Vampire Weekend	For BBC Radio 1 Live Lounge.
"Cowboy Like Me"	Taylor Swift	
"Dance Dance Dance"	Neil Young	Performed live with artists including Neil Young, Michael Kiwanuka and Bear's Den.
"Days/This Time Tomorrow"	Ray Davies	Recorded for Ray Davies' album See My Friends. Also performed live with Ray Davies, including for Later... with Jools Holland.
"Different Kind Of World"	Maggie Rogers	Part of the Hootennany-set of the Railroad Revival Tour 2025 featuring Maggie Rogers.
"Dirty Old Town"	The Pogues	Performed live on15 June 2019, Gentlemen of the Road Presents Malahide Castle. Sang The Pogues version, slight lyric variations from the Ewan MacColl original.
"Deep in the Heart of Texas"	Perry Como	Short snippet performed in Austin, Texas on 08.06.13.
"Deep Water"	The Middle East	
"England"	The National	For MTV Unplugged live session.
"Fare the Well (Dink's Song)"	Traditional	18th century English folk ballad
"Friend of the Devil"	Grateful Dead	On the Grateful Dead cover album Day of the Dead.
"Galway Girl"	Steve Earle	Performed live with Edward Sharpe and the Magnetic Zeros, Ham Sandwich and Ben Howard.
"Golden Slumbers/Carry That Weight"	The Beatles	For BBC Radio 2 live session.
"Go To Sleep"	The Avett Brothers	Performed live with artists including Matthew and the Atlas, The Low Anthem, King Charles, Jerry Douglas and Cadillac Sky.
"Harvest"	Neil Young	Performed live with First Aid Kit and Bear's Den.
"Hey Jude"	The Beatles	Performed live with artists including Sarah Jarosz, Jerry Douglas and Cadillac Sky.
"Hide Your Love Away"	The Beatles	For Saturday Night Live sketch.
"Hurt"	Nine Inch Nails	Performed live twenty times on Delta Tour North America Leg 2, including with Tom Morello, Jerry Douglas and "Big Mike" Harris.
"If I Needed You"	Townes Van Zandt	Performed live occasionally. Guests for different shows include Emmylou Harris and Margo Price.
"I'm Not Alone"	Calvin Harris	For BBC Radio 1 Live Lounge.
"I’m On Fire"	Bruce Springsteen	First performed live acoustic, an electric version was later performed live.
"Jolene"	Dolly Parton	Performed live for BBC Radio 1 live session with Laura Marling. Also performed live with Laura Marling.
"Lady of the River"	King Charles	Performed live with King Charles and Cadillac Sky.
"Lampenda"	Baaba Maal	Performed live with Baaba Maal, The Very Best and Beatenburg.
"Lean On Me"	Bill Withers	Performed live with Edward Sharpe and the Magnetic Zeros.
"Man! I Feel Like A Woman!"	Shania Twain	Part of the Hootennany-set of the Railroad Revival Tour 2025.
"Not in Nottingham"	Disney's Robin Hood	
"S.O.B."	Nathaniel Rateliff	Part of the Hootennany-set of the Railroad Revival Tour 2025 featuring Nathaniel Rateliff.
"Sweet Dreams (Are Made of This)"	Eurythmics	For BBC Radio 2 live session featuring Jack Garratt. Also performed live with Jack Garratt and The Vaccines.
"Sweet Home Alabama"	Lynyrd Skynyrd	Performed live with audience member on vocals.
"Tell It To Me"	Old Crow Medicine Show	Performed live with Old Crow Medicine Show.
"Tessellate"	alt-J	For BBC Radio 1 Live Lounge
"The Boxer"	Simon & Garfunkel	Recorded for Jerry Douglas' album Traveler with Paul Simon. Also performed live with Jerry Douglas. Later released as a bonus track on the Deluxe Edition of Babel.
"The Chain"	Fleetwood Mac	
"The Ghost of Tom Joad"	Bruce Springsteen	First performed live acoustic with Elvis Costello, an electric version was later performed live with Tom Morello.
"The House of the Rising Sun"	Ashley & Foster	Performed live with Tom Morello, The Avett Brothers and Preservation Hall Jazz Band Part of the Hootennany-set of the Railroad Revival Tour 2025.
"The Real Thing"	The Maccabees	Performed for BBC Radio 1 live session with The Maccabees.
"The Weight"	The Band	
"This Train Is Bound For Glory"	Woody Guthrie	
"Unchained Melody"	The Righteous Brothers	Performed live with Tom Morello.
"Unfinished Business"	White Lies	
"Use Me"	Bill Withers	Part of the Hootennany-set of the Railroad Revival Tour 2025.
"Wagon Wheel"	Old Crow Medicine Show	For BBC Radio 2 live session Part of the Hootennany-set of the Railroad Revival Tour 2025 featuring the song's co-author Ketch Secor.
"Walla Walla"	The Offspring	
"What's My Age Again?"	Blink-182	Performed live with Tom Morello, Mark Hoppus and T Bone Burnett.
"With a Little Help from My Friends"	The Beatles	Part of the Hootennany-set of the Railroad Revival Tour 2025.
"You Really Got Me"	The Kinks	Performed live with Tom Morello, The Avett Brothers and Preservation Hall Jazz Band.
"You Shook Me All Night Long"	AC/DC	Performed twice with audience members on vocals. Also performed with Tom Morello.
