= Mumford & Sons discography =

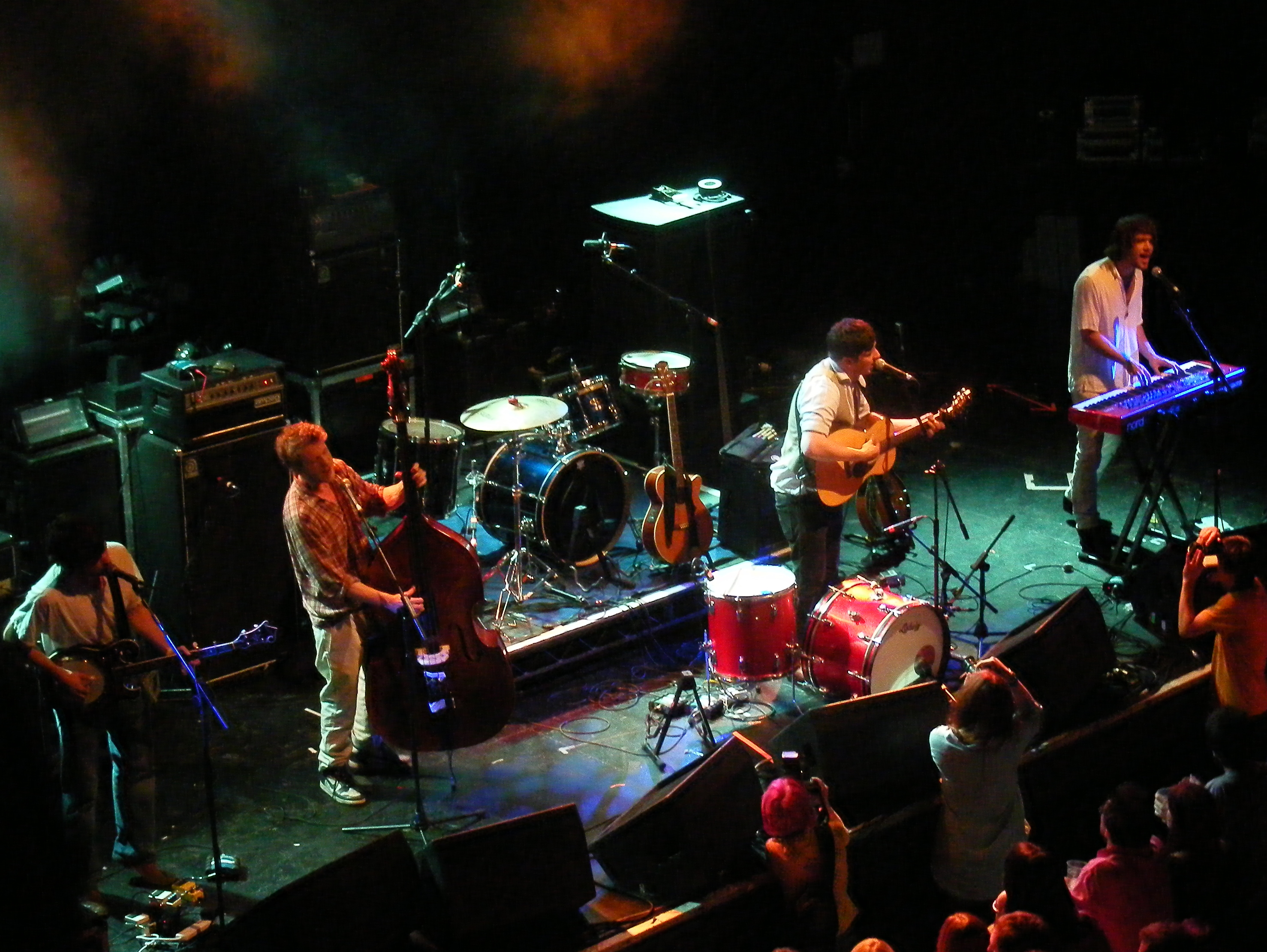
- Mumford & Sons performing at the Dot to Dot Festival in May 2009
- Studio albums: 6
- Live albums: 3
- Singles: 24
- Music videos: 19
- Studio EPs: 6
- Live EPs: 8

British rock band Mumford & Sons have released six studio albums, three live albums, six studio extended plays (three collaborations), eight live extended plays and twenty-four singles.

The band's debut studio album, Sigh No More, was released in October 2009. It was a commercial success, hitting the top ten in multiple countries, including their native United Kingdom, where it peaked at number 2. It has since been certified five times platinum by the British Phonographic Industry (BPI). Four singles were released from the album, including the international hits "Little Lion Man" and "The Cave".

Babel, the band's second award winning studio album, was released in September 2012. It was preceded by the release of its lead single, "I Will Wait", which peaked at number 12 in the UK and the US, as well becoming a top 40 hit in countries such as Australia.

Their third album Wilder Mind, was released in May 2015 and debuted at number one in the UK, the US, Australia, Canada, Ireland, the Netherlands and Norway.

== Albums ==
=== Studio albums ===
List of studio albums, with selected chart positions, sales figures and certifications
Title	Details	Peak chart positions										Sales	Certifications
Title	Details	UK	AUS	AUT	BEL	CAN	IRL	NLD	NZ	SWE	US	Sales	Certifications
Sigh No More	Released: 2 October 2009; Label: Island; Formats: CD, LP, digital download, streaming	2	1	26	3	2	1	3	1	28	2	UK: 1,614,893; CAN: 395,000; US: 3,200,000	BPI: 6× Platinum; ARIA: 4× Platinum; BEA: Platinum; BVMI: 3× Gold; IFPI AUT: Platinum; IFPI DEN: Platinum; MC: 2× Platinum; RIAA: 3× Platinum; RMNZ: 5× Platinum
Babel	Released: 21 September 2012; Label: Island; Formats: CD, LP, digital download, streaming	1	2	2	1	1	1	1	1	4	1	UK: 1,064,338; CAN: 431,000; US: 2,700,000	BPI: 4× Platinum; ARIA: 3× Platinum; BEA: Gold; BVMI: 3× Gold; IFPI AUT: Platinum; IFPI SWE: Platinum; IFPI SWI: Gold; IRMA: 2× Platinum; MC: 5× Platinum; RIAA: 2× Platinum; RMNZ: 4× Platinum
Wilder Mind	Released: 4 May 2015; Label: Island; Formats: CD, LP, digital download, streaming	1	1	2	2	1	1	1	4	2	1	CAN: 107,000; US: 568,000	BPI: Platinum; ARIA: Platinum; BVMI: Gold; IFPI AUT: Platinum; IFPI DEN: Platinum; MC: Platinum; RIAA: Platinum; RMNZ: Platinum
Delta	Released: 16 November 2018; Label: Island; Formats: CD, LP, digital download, streaming	2	5	3	3	1	3	1	4	1	1	US: 214,000	IFPI AUT: Gold; BPI: Gold; MC: Gold; RMNZ: Gold
Rushmere	Released: 28 March 2025; Label: Island, Glassnote; Formats: CD, LP, cassette, digital download, streaming	1	7	3	3	25	10	3	26	—	19		BPI: Silver
Prizefighter	Released: 20 February 2026; Label: Island; Formats: CD, LP, digital download, streaming	1	5	1	1	10	3	4	8	25	10	US: 25,000	BPI: Silver
"—" denotes a recording that did not chart or was not released in that territory.

=== Live albums ===
List of live albums, with selected chart positions
Title	Details	Peak chart positions										Certifications
Title	Details	UK	BEL	GER	NLD	SWE	SWI	US	US Alt.	US Ind.	US Rock	Certifications
Live at Shepherd's Bush Empire	Released: 24 October 2011; Label: Island / Glassnote (US); Formats: Digital download, streaming	—	—	—	—	—	—	80	12	16	18	
The Road to Red Rocks	Released: 30 November 2012; Label: Island / Glassnote (US); Formats: LP, digital download, streaming	— (Note: The Road to Red Rocks did not enter the UK Albums Chart, but peaked at number 17 on the UK Official Music Video Chart Top 50.)	— (Note: The Road to Red Rocks did not enter the Ultratop 200 Albums chart, but peaked at number five on the Flemish Muziek-DVD chart.)	—	— (Note: The Road to Red Rocks did not enter the Dutch Album Top 100, but entered the Dutch DVD Music chart at number five.)	— (Note: The Road to Red Rocks did not enter the Sverigetopplistan Albums Chart, but peaked at number 12 on the Sverigetopplistan DVD Album Chart.)	—	54	13	14	17	ARIA: Gold
Live from South Africa: Dust and Thunder	Released: 15 November 2016; Label: Island / Glassnote (US); Formats: CD	—	—	8	— (Note: Live from South Africa: Dust and Thunder did not enter the Dutch Album Top 100, but entered the Dutch DVD Music chart at number one.)	—	3	—	—	—	—	
"—" denotes a recording that did not chart or was not released in that territory.

== Extended plays ==
=== Studio extended plays ===
List of extended plays, with selected chart positions
Title	Details	Peak chart positions									
Title	Details	UK	AUS	AUT	CAN	GER	NZ	SCO	SWE	SWI	US
Mumford & Sons	Released: 7 July 2008; Label: Chess Club; Formats: 10"	—	—	—	—	—	—	—	—	—	—
Love Your Ground	Released: 3 November 2008; Label: Chess Club; Formats: 10"	—	—	—	—	—	—	—	—	—	—
The Cave and the Open Sea	Released: 6 April 2009; Label: Chess Club; Formats: 10"	—	—	—	—	—	—	—	—	—	—
Mumford & Sons, Laura Marling & Dharohar Project	Released: 5 July 2010; Label: Island; Formats: 10", digital download, streaming	125	—	—	—	—	—	—	—	—	127
The Wedding Band – The First Dance	Released: 1 October 2010; Label: Chess Club; Formats: 10"	—	—	—	—	—	—	—	—	—	—
Johannesburg	Released: 17 June 2016; Label: Island; Formats: 10", CD, cassette, digital download, streaming	6	61	8	4	41	17	6	35	6	9
"—" denotes a recording that did not chart or was not released in that territory.

=== Live extended plays ===
List of live extended plays, with selected chart positions
Title	Details	Peak chart positions					
Title	Details	UK	GER	SCO	US	US Ind.	US Rock
iTunes Festival: London 2009	Released: 17 July 2009; Label: Island; Formats: Digital download, streaming	—	—	—	—	—	—
iTunes Festival: London 2010	Released: 18 July 2010; Label: Island; Formats: Digital download, streaming	—	—	—	—	—	—
iTunes Festival: London 2012	Released: 8 March 2013; Label: Island; Formats: Digital download, streaming	—	—	—	—	—	—
Live from Bull Moose	Released: 20 April 2013; Label: Glassnote; Formats: 10", CD	—	—	—	174	34	48
Apple Music Festival: London 2015	Released: 9 October 2015; Label: Island; Formats: Digital download, streaming	—	—	—	—	—	—
Delta Acoustic Sessions: Live from Electric Lady	Released: 13 April 2019; Label: Island; Formats: 10"	—	—	—	— (Note: Delta Acoustic Sessions: Live from Electric Lady did not enter the US Billboard 200, but peaked at number 63 on the US Album Sales Chart.)	—	—
Sigh No More Sessions	Released: 4 October 2019; Label: Island, Glassnote; Formats: Digital download, streaming	—	—	—	—	—	—
Delta Tour	Released: 20 November 2020; Label: Island; Formats: 12", CD, digital download, streaming	— (Note: Delta Tour did not enter the UK Albums Chart, but peaked at number 28 on the UK Vinyl Albums Chart Top 40.)	68	77	—	—	—
"—" denotes a recording that did not chart or was not released in that territory.

== Singles ==
Title	Year	Peak chart positions										Certifications	Album
Title	Year	UK	AUS	BEL	CAN	IRL	NLD	NZ	SWE	SWI	US	Certifications	Album
"Little Lion Man"	2009	24	3	4	59	19	41	9	—	—	45	BPI: 4× Platinum; ARIA: 4× Platinum; BEA: Gold; BVMI: Gold; IFPI DEN: Platinum; MC: 2× Platinum; RIAA: 2× Platinum; RMNZ: 4× Platinum	Sigh No More
"Winter Winds"	2009	44	—	29	—	—	—	—	—	—	—	BPI: Silver	Sigh No More
"The Cave" (Note: "The Cave" was originally released 11 months earlier, six months before "Little Lion Man" and Sigh No More were released. It was a limited edition single with a B-side different from the 2010 single release.)	2010	31	32	21	31	10	65	23	—	—	27	BPI: 2× Platinum; ARIA: Gold; IFPI DEN: Gold; MC: 2× Platinum; RIAA: 2× Platinum; RMNZ: 2× Platinum	Sigh No More
"Roll Away Your Stone"	2010	135	—	— (Note: "Roll Away Your Stone" did not enter the Flanders Ultratop 50, but peaked at number 15 on the Ultratip chart.)	—	—	—	—	—	—	— (Note: "Roll Away Your Stone" did not enter the Billboard Hot 100, but peaked at number 100 on the US Airplay Top 100 chart.)	BPI: Silver; ARIA: Platinum; MC: Platinum; RMNZ: Platinum	Sigh No More
"I Will Wait"	2012	12	23	14	9	7	34	4	50	39	12	BPI: 3× Platinum; ARIA: 6× Platinum; BVMI: Gold; IFPI DEN: Gold; MC: 5× Platinum; RIAA: 3× Platinum; RMNZ: 5× Platinum	Babel
"Lover of the Light"	2012	108	—	— (Note: "Lover of the Light" did not enter the Flanders Ultratop 50, but peaked at number 3 on the Ultratip chart.)	94	—	94	—	—	— (Note: "Lover of the Light" did not enter the Swiss Singles chart, but charted at number 67 on the Swiss Airplay chart.)	97	BPI: Silver	Babel
"Whispers in the Dark"	2013	195	—	— (Note: "Whispers in the Dark" did not enter the Flanders Ultratop 50, but peaked at number 16 on the Ultratip chart.)	—	—	—	—	—	— (Note: "Whispers in the Dark" did not enter the Swiss Singles chart, but charted at number 69 on the Swiss Airplay chart.)	81		Babel
"Babel"	2013	76	—	— (Note: "Babel" did not enter the Flanders Ultratop 50, but peaked at number 8 on the Ultratip chart.)	80	—	—	—	—	—	60	BPI: Gold	Babel
"Hopeless Wanderer"	2013	— (Note: "Hopeless Wanderer" did not enter the UK Singles Chart, but peaked at number 47 on the UK Streaming Chart.)	—	— (Note: "Hopeless Wanderer" did not enter the Flanders Ultratop 50, but peaked at number 32 on the Ultratip chart.)	—	83	—	—	—	—	59	BPI: Silver	Babel
"Believe"	2015	20	29	27	11	20	46	29	61	42	31	BPI: Platinum; MC: Gold; RIAA: Gold; RMNZ: Platinum	Wilder Mind
"The Wolf"	2015	56	53	— (Note: "The Wolf" did not enter the Flanders Ultratop 50, but peaked at number 4 on the Ultratip chart.)	57	71	— (Note: "The Wolf" did not enter the Netherlands' Single Top 100 but peaked on the Netherlands' Single Tip Chart at number 6.)	—	— (Note: "The Wolf" did not enter the Sverigetopplistan Singles Chart, but peaked at number 8 on the Sverigetopplistan Heatseeker chart.)	—	— (Note: "The Wolf" did not enter the Billboard Hot 100, but peaked at number two on the Bubbling Under Hot 100 Singles chart, which acts as an extension to the Hot 100.)	BPI: Silver	Wilder Mind
"Ditmas"	2015	83	80	— (Note: "Ditmas" did not enter the Flanders Ultratop 50, but peaked at number 17 on the Ultratip chart.)	—	99	—	—	—	— (Note: "Ditmas" did not enter the Swiss Singles chart, but charted at number 65 on the Swiss Airplay chart.)	—	BPI: Silver; RMNZ: Gold	Wilder Mind
"Tompkins Square Park"	2015	86	—	— (Note: "Tompkins Square Park" did not enter the Flanders Ultratop 50, but peaked at number 3 on the Ultratip chart.)	—	—	— (Note: "Tompkins Square Park" did not enter the Netherlands' Single Top 100 but peaked on the Netherlands' Single Tip Chart at number 10.)	—	— (Note: "Tompkins Square Park" did not enter the Sverigetopplistan Singles Chart, but peaked at number 14 on the Sverigetopplistan Heatseeker chart.)	—	—	BPI: Silver	Wilder Mind
"Just Smoke"	2016	137	—	— (Note: "Just Smoke" did not enter the Flanders Ultratop 50, but peaked at number 39 on the Ultratip chart.)	—	—	—	—	—	—	—		Wilder Mind
"There Will Be Time" (with Baaba Maal)	2016	100	—	— (Note: "There Will Be Time" did not enter the Flanders Ultratop 50, but peaked at number 17 on the Ultratip chart.)	— (Note: "There Will Be Time" did not enter the Billboard Canadian Hot 100, but peaked at number 28 on the Canadian Digital Song Sales chart.)	—	— (Note: "There Will Be Time" did not enter the Netherlands' Single Top 100 but peaked on the Netherlands' Single Tip Chart at number 20.)	—	— (Note: "There Will Be Time" did not enter the Sverigetopplistan Singles Chart, but peaked at number 3 on the Sverigetopplistan Heatseeker chart.)	—	— (Note: "There Will Be Time" did not enter the Billboard Hot 100, but peaked at number six on the Hot Singles Sales chart.)	BPI: Silver	Johannesburg
"Guiding Light"	2018	40	—	— (Note: "Guiding Light" did not enter the Flanders Ultratop 50, but peaked at number two on the Ultratip chart.)	69	52	— (Note: "Guiding Light" did not enter the Netherlands Single Top 100 but peaked on the Single Tip Chart at number 13.)	— (Note: "Guiding Light" did not enter the NZ Top 40 Singles Chart, but peaked at number 12 on the NZ Hot Singles Chart.)	98	86	— (Note: "Guiding Light" did not enter the Billboard Hot 100, but peaked at number six on the Bubbling Under Hot 100 Singles chart, which acts as an extension to the Hot 100.)	BPI: Silver	Delta
"Beloved"	2019	66	—	— (Note: "Beloved" did not enter the Flanders Ultratop 50, but peaked at number 32 on the Ultratip chart.)	—	67	—	— (Note: "Beloved" did not enter the NZ Top 40 Singles Chart, but peaked at number 9 on the NZ Hot Singles Chart.)	— (Note: "Beloved" did not enter the Sverigetopplistan Singles Chart, but peaked at number two on the Sverigetopplistan Heatseeker chart.)	— (Note: "Beloved" did not enter the Swiss Singles chart, but charted at number 100 on the Swiss Airplay chart.)	—		Delta
"Woman"	2019	— (Note: "Woman" did not enter the UK Singles Chart, but peaked at number 26 on the UK Physical Singles Chart.)	—	— (Note: "Woman" did not enter the Ultratop Top 50, but peaked at number 28 on the Ultratip chart.)	—	—	—	— (Note: "Woman" did not enter the NZ Top 40 Singles Chart, but peaked at number 25 on the NZ Hot Singles Chart.)	—	—	—	RMNZ: Gold	Delta
"Blind Leading the Blind"	2019	— (Note: "Blind Leading the Blind" did not enter the UK Singles Chart, but peaked at number 8 on the UK Physical Singles Chart Top 100.)	—	— (Note: "Blind Leading the Blind" did not enter the Flanders Ultratop 50, but peaked at number 13 on the Ultratip chart.)	— (Note: "Blind Leading the Blind" did not enter the Billboard Canadian Hot 100, but peaked at number 48 on the Canadian Digital Song Sales chart.)	—	—	—	—	—	—		Non-album singles
"Forever (Garage Version)"	2020	— (Note: "Forever" did not enter the UK Singles Chart, but peaked at number 2 on the UK Physical Singles Chart Top 100.)	—	— (Note: "Forever (Garage Version)" did not enter the Ultratop Top 50, but charted as an extra tip on the Ultratop Bubbling Under chart.)	—	—	—	—	—	—	—		Non-album singles
"Good People" (with Pharrell Williams)	2024	— (Note: "Good People" did not enter the UK Singles Chart, but peaked at number 81 on the UK Singles Sales Chart.)	—	—	—	—	—	— (Note: "Good People" did not enter the NZ Top 40 Singles Chart, but peaked at number 35 on the NZ Hot Singles Chart.)	—	—	—		Non-album singles
"Rushmere"	2025	83	—	—	—	—	—	— (Note: "Rushmere" did not enter the NZ Top 40 Singles Chart, but peaked at number 14 on the NZ Hot Singles Chart.)	—	—	—		Rushmere
"Caroline"	2025	—	—	—	—	—	—	—	—	—	—		Rushmere
"Rubber Band Man" (with Hozier)	2025	64	—	—	78	52	— (Note: "Rubber Band Man" did not enter the Netherlands' Single Top 100 but peaked on the Netherlands' Airplay Chart at number 48.)	— (Note: "Rubber Band Man" did not enter the NZ Top 40 Singles Chart, but peaked at number 13 on the NZ Hot Singles Chart.)	—	—	— (Note: "Rubber Band Man" did not enter the Billboard Hot 100, but peaked at number 20 on the Bubbling Under Hot 100 Singles chart, which acts as an extension to the Hot 100.)		Prizefighter
"Prizefighter"	2025	—	—	—	—	—	—	— (Note: "Prizefighter" did not enter the NZ Top 40 Singles Chart, but peaked at number 26 on the NZ Hot Singles Chart.)	—	—	—		Prizefighter
"The Banjo Song"	2026	91	—	—	—	—	—	— (Note: "The Banjo Song" did not enter the NZ Top 40 Singles Chart, but peaked at number 17 on the NZ Hot Singles Chart.)	—	—	—		Prizefighter
"—" denotes a recording that did not chart or was not released in that territory.

=== Promotional singles ===
Title	Year	Peak chart positions										Certifications	Album
Title	Year	UK	BEL	CAN	FRA	IRL	NLD	SCO	SWE	US	US Rock	Certifications	Album
"Snake Eyes"	2015	60	—	50	193	59	— (Note: "Snake Eyes" did not enter the Netherlands' Single Top 100 but peaked on the Netherlands' Single Tip Chart at number 1.)	29	96	— (Note: "Snake Eyes" did not enter the Billboard Hot 100, but peaked at number 11 on the Bubbling Under Hot 100 Singles chart, which acts as an extension to the Hot 100.)	12	BPI: Silver	Wilder Mind
"Hot Gates"	2015	131	—	—	—	—	— (Note: "Hot Gates" did not enter the Netherlands' Single Top 100 but peaked on the Netherlands' Single Tip Chart at number 24.)	62	— (Note: "Hot Gates" did not enter the Sverigetopplistan Singles Chart, but peaked at number 19 on the Sverigetopplistan Heatseeker chart.)	—	36		Wilder Mind
"Wona" (with Baaba Maal, The Very Best & Beatenberg)	2015	—	— (Note: "Wona" did not enter the Flanders Ultratop 50, but peaked at number 25 on the Ultratip chart.)	—	—	—	—	—	—	—	43		Johannesburg
"If I Say"	2018	— (Note: "If I Say" did not enter the UK Singles Chart, but peaked at number 74 on the UK Singles Sales Chart.)	— (Note: "If I Say" did not enter the Ultratop Top 50, but charted as an extra tip on the Ultratop Bubbling Under chart.)	— (Note: "If I Say" did not enter the Billboard Canadian Hot 100, but peaked at number 25 on the Canadian Digital Song Sales chart.)	—	—	—	58	—	— (Note: "If I Say" did not enter the Billboard Hot 100, but peaked at number 46 on the Digital Song Sales chart.)	18		Delta
"Malibu"	2025	—	—	—	—	—	—	—	—	—	—		Rushmere
"—" denotes a song that did not chart or was not released.

== Other charted songs ==
List of songs, with selected chart positions, showing year released and album name
Title	Year	Peak chart positions										Certifications	Album
Title	Year	UK	BEL	CAN	IRL	MEX	NLD	NZ Hot	SCO	US	US Rock	Certifications	Album
"White Blank Page"	2010	116	—	—	53	—	—	—	—	—	— (Note: "White Blank Page" did not enter the Hot Rock Songs Chart, but peaked at number 36 on the Rock Digital Song Sales Chart.)	BPI: Silver; RMNZ: Gold	Sigh No More
"Timshel"	2010	71	—	—	—	—	—	—	58	—	—		Sigh No More
"Awake My Soul"	2010	—	— (Note: "Awake My Soul" did not enter the Flanders Ultratop 50, but peaked at number 26 on the Ultratip chart.)	—	—	—	—	—	—	—	—	BPI: Silver	Sigh No More
"Hold on to What You Believe"	2011	—	—	—	—	—	—	—	—	—	— (Note: "Hold on to What You Believe" did not enter the Hot Rock Songs Chart, but peaked at number 42 on the Rock Digital Song Sales Chart.)		Sigh No More
"Holland Road"	2012	— (Note: "Holland Road" did not enter the UK Singles Chart, but peaked at number 27 on the UK Streaming Chart.)	—	—	—	—	—	—	—	84	12		Babel
"Ghosts That We Knew"	2012	— (Note: "Ghosts That We Knew" did not enter the UK Singles Chart, but peaked at number 33 on the UK Streaming Chart.)	—	—	—	—	—	—	—	88	13		Babel
"Lover's Eyes"	2012	— (Note: "Lover's Eyes" did not enter the UK Singles Chart, but peaked at number 40 on the UK Streaming Chart.)	—	—	—	—	—	—	—	85	14		Babel
"Reminder"	2012	— (Note: "Reminder" did not enter the UK Singles Chart, but peaked at number 52 on the UK Streaming Chart.)	—	—	—	—	—	—	—	— (Note: "Reminder" did not enter the Billboard Hot 100, but peaked at number six on the Bubbling Under Hot 100 Singles chart, which acts as an extension to the Hot 100.)	21		Babel
"Broken Crown"	2012	— (Note: "Broken Crown" did not enter the UK Singles Chart, but peaked at number 50 on the UK Streaming Chart.)	—	—	—	—	—	—	—	— (Note: "Broken Crown" did not enter the Billboard Hot 100, but peaked at number eight on the Bubbling Under Hot 100 Singles chart, which acts as an extension to the Hot 100.)	22		Babel
"Below My Feet"	2012	— (Note: "Below My Feet" did not enter the UK Singles Chart, but peaked at number 54 on the UK Streaming Chart.)	—	—	—	—	—	—	—	— (Note: "Below My Feet" did not enter the Billboard Hot 100, but peaked at number three on the Bubbling Under Hot 100 Singles chart, which acts as an extension to the Hot 100.)	19		Babel
"Not with Haste"	2012	— (Note: "Not with Haste" did not enter the UK Singles Chart, but peaked at number 63 on the UK Streaming Chart.)	—	—	—	—	—	—	—	— (Note: "Not with Haste" did not enter the Billboard Hot 100, but peaked at number 20 on the Bubbling Under Hot 100 Singles chart, which acts as an extension to the Hot 100.)	23		Babel
"For Those Below"	2012	—	—	—	—	—	—	—	—	—	29		Babel
"The Boxer" (featuring Jerry Douglas and Paul Simon)	2012	97	—	—	77	—	—	—	76	—	— (Note: "The Boxer" did not enter the Hot Rock & Alternative Songs Chart, but peaked at number 21 on the Adult Alternative Airplay Chart.)		Babel
"Where Are You Now"	2012	192	—	—	—	—	—	—	—	— (Note: "Where Are You Now" did not enter the Billboard Hot 100, but peaked at number 15 on the Bubbling Under Hot 100 Singles chart, which acts as an extension to the Hot 100.)	26		Babel
"Wilder Mind"	2015	113	—	—	—	—	— (Note: "Wilder Mind" did not enter the Netherlands' Single Top 100 but peaked on the Netherlands' Single Tip Chart at number 17.)	—	—	—	21		Wilder Mind
"Monster"	2015	143	—	—	—	—	—	—	—	—	35		Wilder Mind
"Broad-Shouldered Beasts"	2015	171	—	—	—	—	—	—	—	—	39		Wilder Mind
"Cold Arms"	2015	182	—	—	—	—	—	—	—	—	40		Wilder Mind
"Only Love"	2015	169	—	91	—	—	—	—	—	—	34		Wilder Mind
"Fool You've Landed" (with The Very Best & Beatenberg)	2016	—	—	—	—	42	—	—	—	—	—		Johannesburg
"42"	2018	91	—	—	—	—	—	27	—	—	33		Delta
"Here" (with Chris Stapleton)	2026	—	—	71	82	—	—	14	—	— (Note: "Here" did not enter the Billboard Hot 100, but peaked at number 10 on the Bubbling Under Hot 100 Singles chart, which acts as an extension to the Hot 100.)	18		Prizefighter
"Run Together"	2026	—	—	—	—	—	—	23	—	—	41		Prizefighter
"Conversation with My Son (Gangsters & Angels)"	2026	—	—	—	—	—	—	—	—	—	45		Prizefighter
"Icarus" (with Gigi Perez)	2026	—	—	—	—	—	—	29	—	—	47		Prizefighter
"Badlands" (with Gracie Abrams)	2026	64	—	89	71	—	— (Note: "Badlands" did not enter the Netherlands' Single Top 100 but peaked on the Netherlands' Single Tip Chart at number 19.)	8	—	— (Note: "Badlands" did not enter the Billboard Hot 100, but peaked at number 25 on the Bubbling Under Hot 100 Singles chart, which acts as an extension to the Hot 100.)	19		Prizefighter
"—" denotes a recording that did not chart or was not released in that territory.

== Guest appearances ==
List of guest appearances, with other performing artists, showing year released and album name
Title	Year	Other artist(s)	Album
"Days/This Time Tomorrow"	2010	Ray Davies	See My Friends
"Learn Me Right"	2012	Birdy	Brave soundtrack
"You & I Belong"	2012	Simone Felice	Simone Felice
"The Brightest Lights"	2012	King Charles	LoveBlood
"Friend of the Devil"	2016	—N/a	Day of the Dead
"Someone Saved My Life Tonight"	2018	—N/a	Revamp: Reimagining the Songs of Elton John & Bernie Taupin
"Devil in Your Eye"	2019	—N/a	For the Throne: Music Inspired by the HBO Series Game of Thrones

== Music videos ==
List of music videos, showing year released and director
Title	Year	Director(s)
"Little Lion Man"	2009	Fred & Nick
"Winter Winds"	2009	Fred & Nick
"The Cave"	2010	Fred & Nick
"Roll Away Your Stone"	2010	Fred & Nick
"I Will Wait"	2012	Fred & Nick
"Lover of the Light"	2012	Idris Elba
"Whispers in the Dark"	2013	Jim Canty
"Babel"	2013	Sam Jones
"Hopeless Wanderer"	2013	Sam Jones
"Believe"	2015	Ross Stirling
"The Wolf"	2015	James Marcus Haney
"Ditmas"	2015	Alex Southam
"Guiding Light"	2018	Joe Connor
"Beloved"	2019	Charlotte Regan
"Woman"	2019	James Marcus Haney
"Blind Leading The Blind"	2019	Nick Davies
"Forever (Garage Version)"	2020	Gavin Batty
"Rushmere"	2025	Charlie Robbins
"Rubber Band Man" (with Hozier)	2025	Unknown
