= Tompkins Square Park (song) =

2015 song by Mumford & Sons

Single by Mumford & Sons

from the album Wilder Mind
- Released: 2 November 2015
- Recorded: 2014–2015
- Studio: AIR Studios (London)
- Genre: Indie rock; post-punk
- Length: 5:11 (album version); 4:24 (single version)
- Label: Island; V2; Glassnote; Gentlemen of the Road
- Songwriters: Ted Dwane; Ben Lovett; Winston Marshall; Marcus Mumford
- Producer: James Ford

Mumford & Sons singles chronology
"Ditmas" (2015)	"Tompkins Square Park" (2015)	"Just Smoke" (2016)

"Tompkins Square Park" is a song by English rock band Mumford & Sons. It was released as the fourth single from their third studio album, Wilder Mind, on 2 November 2015, and also serves as the opening track for the album. The song peaked at number 86 on the UK Singles Chart.

== Composition ==
"Tompkins Square Park" is an indie rock and post-punk song, recorded at AIR Studios in London. The title of the song refers to the park of the same name in East Village, Manhattan.The song is centered around a deteriorating relationship. In the first line, the narrator of the song, who is one half of the relationship, requests their partner to meet them in Tompkins Square Park for a chance of rebuilding said relationship.

== Video ==
No official music video for the song has been made, however, a video of a live version of the song has since been uploaded to the band's Vevo and YouTube channels on 3 May 2015.

== Critical reception ==
Sputnikmusic labelled "Tompkins Square Park" as a "massive highlight," while Jon Dolan of Rolling Stone called the song Wilder Mind's "sharpest moment," commenting "the sentiment is Springsteen, the guitars are straight-up Strokes, and even if it's not going to work out for the relationship in this song, the music itself bristles with self-assurance." James Rainis of Slant was more critical of the song, stating that it "stacks clichés in unexciting ways: 'But no flame burns forever/You and I both know this [all] too well.'"

== Track listing ==
Digital download
No.	Title	Length
1.	"Tompkins Square Park"	4:24

== Charts ==
Chart (2015–16)	Peak position
Belgium (Ultratip Bubbling Under Flanders)	3
Sweden Heatseeker (Sverigetopplistan)	14
UK Singles (OCC)	86
US Hot Rock & Alternative Songs (Billboard)	16

== Certifications ==
Region	Certification	Certified units/sales
United Kingdom (BPI)	Silver	200,000^{‡}
^{‡} Sales+streaming figures based on certification alone.

== Release history ==
Region	Date	Label	Format	Ref.
Europe	2 November 2015	Island; V2; Glassnote; Gentlemen of the Road	Digital download	
