= The Banjo Song =

The Banjo Song may refer to any song played with a banjo. It may also refer to:

- "The Banjo Song", a 1963 song by The Big 3
- "The Banjo Song", a 2026 song by Mumford & Sons from Prizefighter
