= Ditmas (song) =

Single by Mumford & Sons

from the album Wilder Mind
- Released: 11 September 2015
- Recorded: 2014–15 at AIR Studios (London)
- Genre: Indie rock; alternative rock
- Length: 3:38
- Label: Island; Glassnote; Gentlemen of the Road
- Songwriters: Ted Dwane; Ben Lovett; Winston Marshall; Marcus Mumford
- Producer: James Ford

Mumford & Sons singles chronology
"The Wolf" (2015)	"Ditmas" (2015)	"Tompkins Square Park" (2015)

Music video
- "Ditmas" on YouTube

"Ditmas" is a song by the band Mumford & Sons from their third studio album Wilder Mind. It was released worldwide as the third single from the album on September 11, 2015, and was sent to American alternative stations on 17 November 2015.

== Background ==
The title of the song stems from Ditmas Park, Brooklyn, in New York City; Ditmas Park is the location of The National guitarist Aaron Dessner's studio where most of the album was written and demoed. The song is a representation of the change in the band's sound, most noticeably less usage of the banjo and more utilization of electric instruments. The song is described as a breakup song.

== Music video ==
The music video for the song showcases the relationship between a Ukrainian Cossack and his horse. Directed by Alex Southam, the video was shot in Kyiv, Ukraine. The band is also seen performing the song throughout the video.

== Charts ==
Chart (2015–16)	Peak position
Australia (ARIA)	80
Belgium (Ultratip Bubbling Under Flanders)	17
Canada Rock (Billboard)	1
Ireland (IRMA)	99
Scottish Singles Sales (Official Charts)	35
Switzerland Airplay (Schweizer Hitparade)	65
UK Singles (Official Charts)	83
US Hot Rock & Alternative Songs (Billboard)	38
US Rock & Alternative Airplay (Billboard)	15

== Certifications ==
Certifications for "Ditmas"
Region	Certification	Certified units/sales
New Zealand (RMNZ)	Gold	15,000^{‡}
United Kingdom (BPI)	Silver	200,000^{‡}
^{‡} Sales+streaming figures based on certification alone.
