= Blind Leading the Blind (disambiguation) =

The blind leading the blind is an idiom and a metaphor which can be traced back to the Upanishads, and also appears in the Buddhist Pali Canon, Horace and the Bible.

== Art ==
- The Blind Leading the Blind, painting by Pieter Bruegel the Elder, 1568

== Music ==
- "Blind Leading the Blind", Dave Stewart/Mick Jagger track from the 2004 film soundtrack Alfie
- "Blind Leading the Blind", a song by Trivium from Silence in the Snow
- "Blind Leading the Blind", a song by Skin Yard from Skin Yard
- "Blind Leading the Blind", a song by Raven from Architect of Fear
- "Blind Leading the Blind", a song by Mumford & Sons, released as a single in 2019
