= Just Smoke =

Single by Mumford & Sons

from the album Wilder Mind
- Released: 1 February 2016
- Recorded: 2015
- Length: 3:10
- Label: Gentlemen of the Road; Island; Glassnote
- Songwriter(s): Ted Dwane; Ben Lovett; Winston Marshall; Marcus Mumford
- Producer(s): James Ford

Mumford & Sons singles chronology
"Tompkins Square Park" (2015)	"Just Smoke" (2016)	"There Will Be Time" (2016)

"Just Smoke" is a song by English rock band Mumford & Sons. It was released as the fifth and final single from their third studio album, Wilder Mind, on 1 February 2016. The song peaked at number 137 on the UK Singles Chart.

== Track listing ==
Digital download
No.	Title	Length
1.	"Just Smoke"	3:10

== Chart performance ==
Chart (2016)	Peak position
Belgium (Ultratip Bubbling Under Flanders)	39
US Hot Rock & Alternative Songs (Billboard)	32

== Release history ==
Region	Date	Format	Label
United Kingdom	1 February 2016	Digital download	Gentlemen of the Road; Island; Glassnote
