= The Wolf (song) =

Single by Mumford & Sons

from the album Wilder Mind
- A-side: "Believe"
- Released: 29 June 2015
- Recorded: 2014–2015
- Studio: AIR Studios (London)
- Genre: Alternative rock; garage rock; folk rock
- Length: 3:41
- Label: Island; Glassnote; Gentlemen of the Road
- Songwriters: Ted Dwane; Ben Lovett; Winston Marshall; Marcus Mumford
- Producer: James Ford

Mumford & Sons singles chronology
"Believe" (2015)	"The Wolf" (2015)	"Ditmas" (2015)

Music video
- "The Wolf" on YouTube

"The Wolf" is a song by English rock band Mumford & Sons. It was released as the second single from their third studio album Wilder Mind on 9 April 2015 and charted in multiple countries. The official music video for the song was uploaded on 30 June 2015 to the band's Vevo channel on YouTube.

== Composition ==
"The Wolf" is an alternative rock and garage rock song. The song displays the band's change in sound from heavily folk-inspired to more electric instruments. Most noticeably, the use of the banjo is absent from this song as well as Wilder Mind, the album which the song is featured on.

== Music video ==
The official music video for the song, lasting three minutes and fifty-five seconds, was uploaded on 30 June 2015 to the band's Vevo channel on YouTube. Directed by Marcus Haney, the video takes place at the 2015 Bonnaroo Music Festival as the band explores its sights and sounds. It also showcases the headlining performance by the band. In the video the band members are dressed in various costumes; Marcus Mumford can be seen wearing a Robin Hood costume, Ted Dwane in giant chicken costume, Winston Marshall in a wedding dress and Ben Lovett in a fox costume. Actor Ed Helms can also be seen in the video; the actor performed at the festival that year alongside Dierks Bentley.

== Critical reception ==
The single has received positive critical reception. Sputnikmusic labeled the song as a "massive highlight" from Wilder Mind as well as a "beautiful form of alternative rock." Rolling Stone ranked "The Wolf" at number 43 on its annual year-end list to find the best songs of 2015.

== Track listing ==
=== 7" vinyl ===
- Island/Glassnote/Gentlemen of the Road — 4730218

Side A
No.	Title	Length
1.	"Believe"	3:41

Side B
No.	Title	Length
1.	"The Wolf"	3:41

=== Digital download ===
No.	Title	Length
1.	"The Wolf"	3:41

== Charts and certifications ==
=== Weekly charts ===
Weekly chart performance for "The Wolf"
Chart (2015)	Peak position
Australia (ARIA)	53
Austria (Ö3 Austria Top 40)	61
Belgium (Ultratip Bubbling Under Flanders)	4
Canada (Canadian Hot 100)	57
Canada Rock (Billboard)	2
Finland Airplay (Radiosoittolista)	75
Germany (GfK)	77
Ireland (IRMA)	71
Scotland (OCC)	31
Sweden Heatseeker (Sverigetopplistan)	8
UK Singles (OCC)	56
US Bubbling Under Hot 100 (Billboard)	2
US Digital Song Sales (Billboard)	43
US Hot Rock & Alternative Songs (Billboard)	11
US Rock & Alternative Airplay (Billboard)	3

=== Year-end charts ===
Year-end chart performance for "The Wolf"
Chart (2015)	Position
US Hot Rock Songs (Billboard)	22
US Rock Airplay (Billboard)	11

== Certifications ==
Certifications for "The Wolf"
Region	Certification	Certified units/sales
United Kingdom (BPI)	Silver	200,000^{‡}
^{‡} Sales+streaming figures based on certification alone.

== Release history ==
Release dates and formats for "The Wolf"
Region	Date	Label	Format	Catalogue no.
Worldwide	9 April 2015	Island; Glassnote; Gentlemen of the Road	Digital download	
Worldwide	18 April 2015	Island; Glassnote; Gentlemen of the Road	Record Store Day 7"	4730218
