= Rushmere (album) =

Studio album by Mumford & Sons
- Released: 28 March 2025
- Recorded: 2022–2024
- Studios: RCA Studio A (Nashville, Tennessee); Mumford & Sons' home studio (Devon)
- Genre: Folk rock
- Length: 34:18
- Labels: Island; Glassnote
- Producers: Mumford & Sons; Dave Cobb

Mumford & Sons chronology
Delta Tour EP (2020)	Rushmere (2025)	Prizefighter (2026)

Singles from Rushmere
- 1. "Rushmere" Released: 17 January 2025; 2. "Malibu" Released: 18 February 2025; 3. "Caroline" Released: 18 April 2025

Professional ratings
Aggregate scores
Source	Rating
Metacritic	61/100
Review scores
Source	Rating
AllMusic	3/5 stars
Clash	8/10
The Independent	3/5 stars
The Observer	2/5 stars

Rushmere (Note: Stylised in all caps.) is the fifth studio album by British folk rock band Mumford & Sons. It was released on 28 March 2025 through Island Records and Glassnote Records. Their first album in nearly seven years, it marks the longest gap between studio albums for the band. It is also their first studio recording following the departure of guitarist and banjoist Winston Marshall in 2021.

== Background and recording ==
Rushmere sees the band performing as a trio, following the departure of Winston Marshall in 2021. The following three years included the release of a solo self-titled album by member Marcus Mumford (2022) and a collaboration with Pharrell Williams titled "Good People" (2024).

The album is named after the pond located on Wimbledon Common in London where Marcus Mumford, Ted Dwane, and Ben Lovett first got to know each other as friends and eventual creative collaborators. According to a press release, the intent was to take listeners back to where "it all" began while the trio itself felt "restless to get going, relieved and excited" to share new music. Recorded between 2022 and 2024 at RCA Studio A in Nashville, Savannah (Georgia) and at their own studio in Devon with producer Dave Cobb, the trio described working on new music as "the most prolific two years" they had ever experienced.

== Promotion and singles ==
The album was announced on 15 January 2025 through an Instagram post shared by the band. News were accompanied by a trailer that includes song snippets and behind-the-scenes footage of the recording process. The "rousing" title track was released as the lead single on 17 January. The song was seen as a return to their roots with the inclusion of "folk pop instrumentation" and an "anthemic peak" performed by Marcus Mumford over a "banjo line".

== Reception ==
=== Critical reception ===
Rushmere received generally positive reviews from music critics. At Metacritic, which assigns a normalized rating out of 100 to reviews from mainstream critics, the album received an average score of 61, based on 7 reviews, which indicates "generally favorable reviews".

=== Commercial performance ===
Rushmere debuted atop the UK Albums and UK Americana Albums charts with 35,655 units, marking their third number one album in the country.

== Track listing ==
All tracks are written by Marcus Mumford, Ben Lovett and Ted Dwane, with additional writers noted.

Rushmere track listing
No.	Title	Writer(s)	Length
1.	"Malibu"		4:02
2.	"Caroline"		3:20
3.	"Rushmere"	Natalie Hemby; Greg Kurstin	3:12
4.	"Monochrome"		3:04
5.	"Truth"		3:43
6.	"Where It Belongs"		4:07
7.	"Anchor"	Justin Hayward-Young	2:51
8.	"Surrender"	Kurstin; Caitlyn Smith	3:10
9.	"Blood on the Page" (with Madison Cunningham)		3:06
10.	"Carry On"		3:43
Total length:			34:18

== Personnel ==
Credits adapted from Tidal.

=== Mumford & Sons ===
- Marcus Mumford – lead vocals, acoustic and electric guitars; banjo (1, 3), drums (2, 8); production
- Ben Lovett – piano, organ; synthesizer (1, 8); background vocals, production
- Ted Dwane – double bass (1, 2, 6, 7), bass guitar (3–5, 8–10); acoustic and electric guitars, background vocals, production

=== Additional musicians ===
- Jay Bellerose – drums (1), percussion (2)
- Ethan Gruska – background vocals (2, 9, 10), acoustic guitar (8)
- Dave Cobb – electric guitar (2), acoustic guitar (4, 5, 8, 10), background vocals (9)
- Matt Menefee – banjo (3)
- Derrek Phillips – drums (3–5, 8, 10)
- Benjamin Lanz – trombone (3)
- Kyle Resnick – trumpet (3)
- Matt Doe – trumpet (3)
- Madison Cunningham – electric guitar (4), background vocals (9)
- James McAlister – electric guitar (8)
- Aaron Dessner – synthesizer (8)

=== Technical ===
- Dave Cobb – production
- Emily Lazar – mastering (all tracks), co-mixing (track 5)
- Tom Elmhirst – mixing
- Brandon Bost – engineering
- Darrell Thorp – engineering (tracks 1, 2, 6, 7)
- Adam Hong – additional mixing
- Bob DeMaa – additional mixing (track 5), mastering assistance (all tracks)
- Gosha Usov – additional engineering (tracks 2, 8, 10)
- Bella Blasko – additional engineering (tracks 3, 8, 10)
- Lance Powell – additional engineering (track 3)
- Ethan Barrette – engineering assistance
- Phillip Smith – engineering assistance (track 1)
- Dani Perez – engineering assistance (tracks 2, 3, 8)
- Michael Deano – engineering assistance (tracks 3, 8, 10)
- Lauren Marquez – engineering assistance (track 5)
- Brendan Davies – engineering assistance (track 6)

== Charts ==
Chart performance for Rushmere
Chart (2025)	Peak position
Australian Albums (ARIA)	7
Austrian Albums (Ö3 Austria)	3
Belgian Albums (Ultratop Flanders)	3
Belgian Albums (Ultratop Wallonia)	19
Canadian Albums (Billboard)	25
Dutch Albums (Album Top 100)	3
German Albums (Offizielle Top 100)	5
Irish Albums (Official Charts)	10
Italian Albums (FIMI)	41
New Zealand Albums (RMNZ)	26
Portuguese Albums (AFP)	127
Scottish Albums (Official Charts)	1
Spanish Albums (PROMUSICAE)	44
Swiss Albums (Schweizer Hitparade)	10
UK Albums (Official Charts)	1
UK Americana Albums (Official Charts)	1
UK Folk Albums (Official Charts)	1
US Billboard 200	19
US Americana/Folk Albums (Billboard)	2
US Independent Albums (Billboard)	2
US Top Rock & Alternative Albums (Billboard)	3

== Certifications ==
Region	Certification	Certified units/sales
United Kingdom (BPI)	Silver	60,000^{‡}
^{‡} Sales+streaming figures based on certification alone.
