= Believe (Mumford & Sons song) =

Song by British rock band Mumford & Sons

Single by Mumford & Sons

from the album Wilder Mind
- B-side: "If This Is Love"; "The Wolf"
- Released: 9 March 2015
- Recorded: 2014–2015
- Studio: AIR Studios (London)
- Genre: Alternative rock
- Length: 3:41
- Label: Island; Glassnote; Gentlemen of the Road
- Songwriters: Marcus Mumford; Ben Lovett; Winston Marshall; Ted Dwane
- Producer: James Ford

Mumford & Sons singles chronology
"Hopeless Wanderer" (2013)	"Believe" (2015)	"The Wolf" (2015)

Music video
- "Believe Official Audio" on YouTube

"Believe" is a song by British rock band Mumford & Sons. The song was released on 9 March 2015, serving as the lead single from the band's third studio album, Wilder Mind (2015). The song marks a significant departure in the sound of the band, substituting their acoustic instrumentation for electric with a more alternative sound being featured in the song.

== Background ==
After attending a friend's wedding in Texas, USA, the band stayed at a ranch for a week to write songs. Mumford, the band's usual songwriter, left a day early and by the time the band met up again in London, Dwane, Lovett and Marshall had written the song "Believe". The band then built the song up together, which was eventually recorded and produced by James Ford. The song has a length of 3 minutes and 41 seconds. The song, which has rock music influences and was inspired by bands such as the National, is considered a departure from the folk rock sound Mumford & Sons had become known for on their albums Sigh No More and Babel.

"Believe" was first aired on BBC Radio 1 on 9 March 2015 and was subsequently made available to download Worldwide.

== Critical reception ==
Many music critics complimented the band's change of sound. NME gave the song a very positive review, saying "'Believe' proves that the Mumfords know exactly what they're doing. Twinkling synths herald its arrival, as Marcus softly deals with weighty matters of the heart. "I don't even know if I believe/everything you're trying to say to me," he croons, as the song keeps relatively light on its feet over its first half, as languid keys do calmly flirt with the idea of becoming a string section, but then think better of it. It's all change at two minute mark though, when Winston Marshall, finally free from the shackles of the banjo, lets rip a piercing electric guitar wail as the song rockets skywards. From here on in, it's a steady race to epic heights. "Say something like you love me," implores Marcus against increased riffage courtesy of Winston, in what's easily the first stadium-worthy song of 2015". In a positive review, The Independent commented on the lack of banjo in the song, "Synthetic sounds can sometimes create a flatness to a tune, but the Mumfords have managed to use them to create a sense of power and energy that’s hard to resist. The banjo is dead, long live electric". Maud Deitch of Pitchfork Media said in a review of Wilder Mind, "Songs like 'Believe' are so lumbering that they are almost vulgar", criticising Mumford for using his "best Chris Martin-soft-voice".

== Chart performance ==
"Believe" peaked at number 1 on the US iTunes chart and number 5 on the UK iTunes chart after its release, reaching number 31 on the US Billboard Hot 100 chart and number 20 on the UK Official Chart, due to its midweek release.

== Music video ==
"Believe" was the first Mumford & Sons single to not receive an official music video. An 'Official Audio' video was uploaded to the band's YouTube channel after its radio premiere.

== Live performances ==
Mumford & Sons made their live return at the 375 capacity Oslo, Hackney on 8 March 2015 with an intimate show for family and friends. The band played again to fans on the following two nights, debuting songs from Wilder Mind, including "Believe". This was followed by shows at small venues in Berlin, Los Angeles, Toronto and New York, with the band playing two nights in each city.

On 11 April 2015, the band performed on Saturday Night Live for the second time, playing "Believe" for the first time on television. On 21 April 2015, the band performed "Believe" on Later... with Jools Holland.

== Other versions ==
The song was covered by British rock band Nothing But Thieves for the BBC Radio 1 Live Lounge series.

== Track listing ==
Digital download – Single
No.	Title	Length
1.	"Believe"	3:41

7" single (Wilder Mind 7” Collectors Box Edition)
No.	Title	Length
1.	"Believe"	3:41
2.	"If This Is Love"	3:14

7" single (Record Store Day Edition)
No.	Title	Length
1.	"Believe"	3:41
2.	"The Wolf"	3:41

== Credits and personnel ==
- Marcus Mumford – lead vocals, rhythm guitar
- Ted Dwane – bass guitar
- Winston Marshall – vocals, lead guitar
- Ben Lovett – vocals, keyboard, synth
- James Ford – drums
- Tom Hobden – fiddle

== Charts ==
=== Weekly charts ===
Weekly chart performance for "Believe"
Chart (2015)	Peak position
Australia (ARIA)	29
Austria (Ö3 Austria Top 40)	67
Belgium (Ultratop 50 Flanders)	35
Belgium (Ultratip Bubbling Under Wallonia)	29
Canada Hot 100 (Billboard)	11
Canada Hot AC (Billboard)	30
Canada Rock (Billboard)	1
Czech Republic Singles Digital (ČNS IFPI)	25
Euro Digital Song Sales (Billboard)	16
Germany (GfK)	65
Hungary (Stream Top 40)	28
Ireland (IRMA)	20
Japan Hot 100 (Billboard)	38
Netherlands (Single Top 100)	46
New Zealand (Recorded Music NZ)	29
Scotland Singles (OCC)	15
Slovenia (SloTop50)	30
Sweden (Sverigetopplistan)	62
Switzerland (Schweizer Hitparade)	47
UK Singles (OCC)	20
US Billboard Hot 100	31
US Adult Contemporary (Billboard)	29
US Adult Pop Airplay (Billboard)	17
US Hot Rock & Alternative Songs (Billboard)	4
US Rock & Alternative Airplay (Billboard)	1

=== Year-end chart ===
Year-end chart performance for "Believe"
Chart (2015)	Position
Canada (Canadian Hot 100)	99
US Hot Rock Songs (Billboard)	11
US Rock Airplay (Billboard)	8

== Certifications ==
Certifications for "Believe"
Region	Certification	Certified units/sales
Canada (Music Canada)	Gold	5,000^{^}
Italy (FIMI)	Gold	25,000^{‡}
New Zealand (RMNZ)	Platinum	30,000^{‡}
Sweden (GLF)	Platinum	40,000^{‡}
United Kingdom (BPI)	Platinum	600,000^{‡}
United States (RIAA)	Gold	500,000^{‡}
^{^} Shipments figures based on certification alone.^{‡} Sales+streaming figures based on certification alone.

== Release history ==
Release dates and formats for "Believe"
Region	Date	Label	Format
Worldwide	9 March 2015	Gentlemen of the Road, Island	Digital download
