= Prizefighter (album) =

Studio album by Mumford & Sons
- Released: 20 February 2026
- Recorded: 2025
- Studio: Long Pond (New York)
- Length: 49:47
- Labels: Island; Gentlemen of the Road
- Producers: Mumford & Sons; Aaron Dessner

Mumford & Sons chronology
Rushmere (2025)	Prizefighter (2026)

Singles from Prizefighter
- 1. "Rubber Band Man" Released: 24 October 2025; 2. "Prizefighter" Released: 12 December 2025; 3. "The Banjo Song" Released: 9 January 2026; 4. "Here" Released: 27 March 2026

Prizefighter is the sixth studio album by the British folk rock band Mumford & Sons, released on 20 February 2026 via Island Records and the group's label Gentlemen of the Road. Produced by the band with Aaron Dessner, the group began writing songs for Prizefighter before the release of their previous album Rushmere (2025), and recorded the entire album in ten days at Dessner's studio in New York. It was accompanied by four singles: "Rubber Band Man" (with Hozier), "Prizefighter", "The Banjo Song", and "Here" (with Chris Stapleton). In addition, the album features collaborations with Gigi Perez, and Gracie Abrams.

== Background and recording ==
After completing their fifth album Rushmere (2025), Mumford & Sons continued to write and record music. During one of their sessions at Electric Lady Studios, the group ran into Aaron Dessner, who previously worked on their 2015 album Wilder Mind. They shared demo recordings with him while he played them songs he had written with Justin Vernon and Jon Bellion. Frontman Marcus Mumford travelled with Dessner to various parts of the world to write songs, including "Rubber Band Man". The album was recorded in ten days at Dessner's Long Pond Studios in New York, with the group writing "more songs than [they] had in the last seven years combined".

Unlike previous Mumford & Sons albums, Prizefighter features several featured collaborations with other artists, including Chris Stapleton, Hozier, Gigi Perez, and Gracie Abrams; group member Ben Lovett attributed their desire to work with other musicians to "a place of security that was formed through the work with Pharrell [on 2024's 'Good People'] and with Dave Cobb on Rushmere." The group sent a rough version of the album to Hozier, a longtime friend, and he asked to sing on "Rubber Band Man" after it "jumped out to him". Abrams' involvement began when she heard a version of "The Banjo Song", which was not originally written by the group, and encouraged Mumford to record it. She became "a sounding board for the entire album", providing feedback on lyrics throughout its production. She was offered to appear on any track and selected "Badlands", which she "envisaged that song as a duet" and lead to the group approaching it as "a Bonnie and Clyde-style getaway song". Mumford sent a demo of "Here" to Stapleton, his "favourite vocalist in the world right now", and asked him to feature on the track he described as their "Brokeback moment". Justin Vernon, Brandi Carlile, and Finneas also contributed to the album.

== Release ==
Mumford & Sons released "Rubber Band Man", a collaboration with Hozier, as a single on 24 October 2025. Prizefighter was officially announced on 29 October 2025, seven months after the release of Rushmere. The title track was released as the album's second single on 12 December 2025, followed by the third single "The Banjo Song" on 9 January 2026.

It was released on 20 February 2026 through Island Records and the group's label Gentlemen of the Road; it was initially scheduled for release on 13 February. To promote the album, Mumford & Sons hosted numerous listening events from 6–19 February 2026 at various American independent record stores.

== Track listing ==
All tracks are written by Marcus Mumford, Ben Lovett, Ted Dwane, and Aaron Dessner, with other writers noted.

Prizefighter track listing
No.	Title	Writer(s)	Length
1.	"Here" (with Chris Stapleton)		3:11
2.	"Rubber Band Man" (with Hozier)	Brandi Carlile	3:20
3.	"The Banjo Song"	Jon Bellion	3:49
4.	"Run Together"	Finneas	3:39
5.	"Conversation with My Son (Gangsters & Angels)"		5:29
6.	"Alleycat"		3:08
7.	"Prizefighter"	Justin Vernon	3:29
8.	"Begin Again"		3:44
9.	"Icarus" (with Gigi Perez)	Kevin Garrett	3:12
10.	"Stay"		3:23
11.	"Badlands" (with Gracie Abrams)	Vernon	2:58
12.	"Shadow of a Man"		3:43
13.	"I'll Tell You Everything"		2:42
14.	"Clover"		3:42
Total length:			49:47

== Personnel ==
Credits adapted from Tidal.

=== Mumford & Sons ===
- Marcus Mumford – vocals, background vocals, production (all tracks); shaker (tracks 1, 2, 4, 5, 8, 9), drums (1, 3–6, 8–12), tambourine (1, 3, 4, 8, 9, 12), 12-string electric guitar (1, 4, 8), baritone guitar (1), percussion (2, 4, 5), mandolin (3, 5, 13), acoustic guitar (4, 8, 10, 12), synthesizer (5), electric guitar (8)
- Ben Lovett – production (all tracks); background vocals (1–9, 11, 12, 14), Hammond organ (1, 3–5, 8), piano (1–3, 8, 10–12), Mellotron (1, 3, 8), synthesizer (4, 5, 8, 10, 11, 14), upright piano (5, 14); acoustic guitar, keyboards (7); Hammond B3 (10, 13)
- Ted Dwane – production (all tracks); background vocals (1, 3–6, 8, 9, 11–14), upright bass (2, 4, 12), bass guitar (3, 7, 9, 14), electric guitar (5, 10)

=== Additional musicians ===
- Aaron Dessner – acoustic guitar (1–5, 7–9, 12), electric guitar (1, 3–5, 8, 10, 11, 13, 14), synthesizer (2–6, 8, 9, 13), drums (2–5, 11), banjo (2–4), Mellotron (2, 3, 8, 9, 12, 13), piano (2, 3, 8, 9, 13), drum programming (2, 4–10), bass guitar (3, 5, 6, 10–13), synth bass (3, 5, 8, 10, 11), programming (3), percussion (5, 8, 9, 13), mandolin (6, 8, 9, 12), nylon-string guitar (7), celesta (8), shaker (10, 12)
- James McAlister – synthesizer (1–3, 6, 8, 10, 11); Moog bass, tambourine (1–3); acoustic guitar (2, 6), maracas (2), drum programming (6, 8–10), percussion (6, 8), bass guitar (6), electric guitar (8, 10)
- Benjamin Lanz – trombone (1, 3), trumpet (3), synthesizer (8, 9)
- Chris Stapleton – vocals (1)
- Rob Moose – string arrangement, violin, viola (2, 4, 5, 12, 13, 14)
- Andrew Hozier-Byrne – vocals (2)
- Josh Kaufman – electric guitar, mandolin (3)
- JT Bates – drums (3)
- Jon Bellion – background vocals (3)
- Matt Menefee – banjo (4)
- Kyle Resnick – trumpet (4)
- Amelia Meath – background vocals (5)
- Andrew Barr – drums (5–7, 10, 13), shaker (5–7, 13), tambourine (10, 13)
- Justin Vernon – vocals, background vocals (7); drum programming (11)
- Gigi Perez – vocals (9)
- Gracie Abrams – vocals (11)

=== Technical ===
- Aaron Dessner – production
- Jon Bellion – co-production (3)
- Bella Blasko – engineering (all tracks), mixing (5, 9, 12)
- Brandon Bost – engineering (1–3, 5–11)
- Maxime Le Guil – engineering (1–3, 7)
- Darryl Thorp – engineering (1)
- Brendan Davies – engineering (3), engineering assistance (2)
- James McAlister – engineering (8), additional engineering (1, 2, 6, 9–11)
- Aidan Hobbs – engineering (9)
- Benjamin Lanz – additional engineering (1–4, 8)
- Rob Moose – additional engineering (2, 4, 5, 12–14)
- Josh Kaufman – additional engineering (3)
- Nick Lloyd – additional engineering (4, 5, 8, 10, 13)
- Kyle Resnick – additional engineering (4, 5)
- Maryam Qudus – additional engineering (4)
- Serban Ghenea – mixing (1–4, 6–8, 10, 11, 13, 14)
- Bryce Bordone – additional mixing (1–4, 6–8, 10, 11, 13, 14)
- Emily Lazar – mastering
- Bob DeMaa – mastering assistance

== Charts ==
Chart performance for Prizefighter
Chart (2026)	Peak position
Australian Albums (ARIA)	5
Austrian Albums (Ö3 Austria)	1
Belgian Albums (Ultratop Flanders)	1
Belgian Albums (Ultratop Wallonia)	2
Canadian Albums (Billboard)	10
Dutch Albums (Album Top 100)	4
French Albums (SNEP)	137
French Rock & Metal Albums (SNEP)	6
German Albums (Offizielle Top 100)	3
German Rock & Metal Albums (Offizielle Top 100)	2
Irish Albums (Official Charts)	3
Italian Albums (FIMI)	31
New Zealand Albums (RMNZ)	8
Portuguese Albums (AFP)	47
Scottish Albums (Official Charts)	1
Spanish Albums (Promusicae)	55
Swedish Albums (Sverigetopplistan)	25
Swiss Albums (Schweizer Hitparade)	2
UK Albums (Official Charts)	1
UK Americana Albums (Official Charts)	1
UK Folk Albums (Official Charts)	1
US Billboard 200	10
US Independent Albums (Billboard)	2
US Top Rock & Alternative Albums (Billboard)	1

== Certifications ==
Certifications for Prizefighter
Region	Certification	Certified units/sales
United Kingdom (BPI)	Silver	60,000^{‡}
^{‡} Sales+streaming figures based on certification alone.
