= Wilder Mind =

Studio album by Mumford & Sons
- Released: 4 May 2015
- Recorded: 2014–2015
- Studio: AIR Studios (London)
- Genre: Indie rock; arena rock
- Length: 47:35
- Label: Island; Glassnote; Gentlemen of the Road
- Producer: James Ford

Mumford & Sons chronology
Babel (2012)	Wilder Mind (2015)	Johannesburg (2016)

Singles from Wilder Mind
- 1. "Believe" Released: 9 March 2015; 2. "The Wolf" Released: 29 June 2015; 3. "Ditmas" Released: 11 September 2015; 4. "Tompkins Square Park" Released: 2 November 2015; 5. "Just Smoke" Released: 1 February 2016

Wilder Mind is the third studio album by British folk rock band Mumford & Sons. It was released on 4 May 2015 through Gentlemen of the Road, Island, Glassnote and Universal Music Group. It was an international success in its first week on sale, charting at number one in seven countries, topping both the UK Albums Chart and the US Billboard 200, and reaching the top 5 in nine other countries. Five singles have been released from the album, "Believe", "The Wolf", "Ditmas", "Tompkins Square Park" and "Just Smoke".

After working with Markus Dravs for their first two albums, the band decided to hire producer James Ford and The National's Aaron Dessner. The album marks a departure from the group's folk rock sound, as they abandoned their signature acoustic instruments (such as banjo and upright bass) for electric ones and added a session drummer to fill out their rhythm section.

== Background and recording ==
In September 2013, following the end of the world tour in support of their second album Babel, Mumford & Sons began what they thought would be a lengthy break, but found themselves back at work only five months later. After a couple of days in London at Dwane's studio, the band headed back to Brooklyn to write and demo tracks at the garage studio owned by The National’s Aaron Dessner, where the band had spent time recording demos in the months leading up to the end of the Babel tour.

Lovett and Marshall were living in New York, with Mumford & Dwane still based in England, so for the next eight months, the band split their writing sessions between Dessner's New York garage and London's Eastcote Studios, where their debut album, Sigh No More had been recorded. The band then recorded Wilder Mind at AIR Studios in London with producer James Ford, who also traded off drumming duties with Mumford.

== Composition ==
Larry Fitzmaurice of Pitchfork described Wilder Mind as "clean, streamlined, and positively Coldplay-esque rock music". Jon Dolan of Rolling Stone dubbed the album "an indie-rock-steeped affair". Jordan Bassett of NME described the album as "electric guitar-led arena rock".

== Promotion ==
On 27 February 2015, the band released a short video teasing new live material, promising a further announcement on 2 March 2015. It was revealed on 2 March 2015 that the third studio album from the band will be entitled Wilder Mind and will be released on 4 May 2015, with the first single "Believe" being released to radio stations on 9 March and available to download straight after.

Mumford & Sons made their live return at the 375 capacity Oslo, Hackney on 8 March 2015 with an intimate show for family and friends. The band played again to fans on the following two nights, debuting songs from Wilder Mind. This was followed by shows at small venues in Berlin, Los Angeles, Toronto and New York, with the band playing two nights in each city. The second single from Wilder Mind, "The Wolf" premiered on BBC Radio 1 on 9 April 2015, and was made available to download straight after, with the official audio being uploaded to the band's YouTube channel. The official video, a live video of the band performing the song, was uploaded to YouTube on 13 April 2015.

On 11 April 2015, the band performed on Saturday Night Live for the second time. They performed "The Wolf" and "Believe" for the first time on television.

For Record Store Day on 18 April 2015, the band released the coordinates of stores where fans could attend to listen to Wilder Mind in full on vinyl record, over two weeks before its release. The band also released a limited edition 7" record of "Believe"/"The Wolf" for the event. A day later on 21 April 2015, the band appeared as a musical guest on Later... with Jools Holland, performing "The Wolf" and "Believe". On the extended version, the band also premiered "Snake Eyes" for the first time on television. A snippet of the studio version of the song had already been heard on the 12 April 2015 edition of Sky Sports Super Sunday, and a live video released to YouTube on 20 April 2015.

On 30 April 2015 the band announced an intimate show at Brighton Corn Exchange exclusively to members of their mailing list. The gig took place on 1 May 2015, with the band playing songs from all three albums. On 27 April 2015, the band were invited to perform a Live Lounge special for BBC Radio 1 at Maida Vale Studios. As well as "The Cave" and a cover of Shura's "2Shy", four songs from Wilder Mind were performed, including a premiere of "Hot Gates", which became available to download straight after. Two days later on 29 April 2015, the band performed "The Wolf" on The Graham Norton Show.

Wilder Mind was released 4 May 2015. On May 5 May 2015, the band recorded "Believe" for the Late Show with David Letterman before performing a full set of songs for live-streamed webcast Legends of Letterman. The band continued this US promo with an appearance on The Daily Show with Jon Stewart on 7 May 2015 and live streamed concerts for iHeartRadio and SiriusXM on 8 and 9 May 2015 respectively.

== Singles ==
"Believe" was released as the first single from the album on 9 March 2015 worldwide. The song premiered on BBC Radio 1 and was made available to download and stream straight after, with the official audio being uploaded to the band's YouTube channel. An official live video of the band performing the song was uploaded to YouTube on 29 April 2015. The song was the first Mumford & Sons single to receive no official music video.

"The Wolf" was released as the second single from the album on 29 June 2015 worldwide. The song premiered on BBC Radio 1 on 9 April 2015 and was made available to download and stream straight after, with the official audio being uploaded to the band's YouTube channel. An official live video of the band performing the song was uploaded to YouTube on 13 April 2015. The official video was uploaded to YouTube on 30 June 2015.

"Ditmas" was released as the third single from the album on 11 September 2015 worldwide. The official video was uploaded to YouTube on 22 July 2015.

"Tompkins Square Park" was as released as the fourth single from the album on 2 November 2015. Prior the song's release, an official live video of the band performing the song was uploaded to YouTube on 3 May 2015. The song received no official music video.

"Just Smoke" was released as the fifth single from the album on 1 February 2016 worldwide. The song received no official music video.

=== Promotional singles ===
"Snake Eyes" was released as a promotional single on 20 April 2015, prior to its television premiere on Later... with Jools Holland. It was made available as an 'instant grat' download on upon pre-ordering the album and to stream. An official live video of the band performing the song was uploaded to YouTube on 19 April 2015. The song was re-released to radio in February 2016.

"Hot Gates" was also released as a promotional single from the album on 30 April 2015, prior to its radio premiere on the BBC Radio 1 Live Lounge special, four days before the release of the album. It was made available as an 'instant grat' download on upon pre-ordering the album and to stream.

== Critical reception ==
Professional ratings
Aggregate scores
Source	Rating
AnyDecentMusic?	5.4/10
Metacritic	54/100
Review scores
Source	Rating
AllMusic	2.5/5 stars
The A.V. Club	C
Entertainment Weekly	B
The Guardian	2/5 stars
The Independent	4/5 stars
NME	8/10
Pitchfork	2.0/10
Q	4/5 stars
Rolling Stone	3.5/5 stars
Spin	5/10

Wilder Mind received mixed reviews from music critics. At Metacritic, which assigns a normalized rating out of 100 to reviews from mainstream critics, the album received an average score of 54, based on 29 reviews, which indicates "mixed or average reviews".

In a five-star review, Neil McCormick of The Daily Telegraph hailed the album as a "triumph" and wrote that Marcus Mumford "has never sounded better than on this overwhelmingly tense and bittersweet album". Andy Gill of The Independent felt that the band's musical transition towards more guitar-oriented instrumentation had been successful, singling out the album's "surging electric guitar riffs with synth and organ textures" for praise.

Leonie Cooper of NME was also positive, noting Aaron Dessner's large influence on the album's production and concluding: "Still missing the banjos? Didn’t think so". Garrett Kamps of Billboard stated that "not only does Wilder Mind reintroduce the band members as rock gods worthy of the title, it does so without changing what fans cherished most about them in the first place: their songwriting, their sentiment, their gusto." For Rolling Stone, Jon Dolan wrote that "the sentiment is Springsteen, the guitars are straight-up Strokes, and even if it's not going to work out for the relationship in this song, the music itself bristles with self-assurance."

In a mixed assessment, Stephen Thomas Erlewine of AllMusic felt that in their attempt to break away from their vintage folk leanings, the band now "seems interchangeable with any number of blandly attractive AAA rockers" and wrote that "the odd thing about Wilder Mind is now that everybody else sounds like Mumford & Sons, Mumford & Sons decide to sound like everybody else." While noting that "brief flashes of newfound power and sophistication hint at a potentially fruitful plugged-in future for Mumford & Sons", James Rainis of Slant Magazine felt that the album as a whole was unremarkable, criticising its "compositional predictability" and "tired lyrical sentiments".

Pitchfork's Maud Deitch called Wilder Mind "a 'rock' record in the least interesting sense of that word—a pastiche of the genre's most common elements, from big percussion, electric guitars, and warm synths, to poignant but ultimately surface-level lyrics". PopMatters's Brice Ezell commented on how the band had "stripped away the artifice from their ostensible Americana aesthetic to reveal the boilerplate alt-rock that forms its core circuitry".

== Commercial performance ==
Wilder Mind debuted at number one on the UK Albums Chart, marking the band's second number one album in the United Kingdom. It sold 81,300 copies in its first week of release to become the second fastest-selling album of 2015. The following week saw the album spend a second consecutive week at number one in the UK, becoming the first album to do so in 2015.

In the United States, the album became the band's second number one on the Billboard 200, debuting at number one with sales of 231,000 copies, or 249,000 units including tracks sales and streams. Furthermore, the band marked the largest debut for a rock album in 2015 and the third-biggest opening overall of the year. The album has sold 568,000 copies in the US as of May 2016.

== Track listing ==
All tracks are written by Mumford & Sons (Marcus Mumford, Ben Lovett, Winston Marshall, and Ted Dwane).

No.	Title	Length
1.	"Tompkins Square Park"	5:11
2.	"Believe"	3:41
3.	"The Wolf"	3:41
4.	"Wilder Mind"	4:38
5.	"Just Smoke"	3:10
6.	"Monster"	3:56
7.	"Snake Eyes"	4:08
8.	"Broad-Shouldered Beasts"	4:20
9.	"Cold Arms"	2:49
10.	"Ditmas"	3:38
11.	"Only Love"	4:36
12.	"Hot Gates"	4:47

Deluxe edition bonus tracks
No.	Title	Length
13.	"Tompkins Square Park" (live)	5:13
14.	"Believe" (live)	3:49
15.	"The Wolf" (live)	3:53
16.	"Snake Eyes" (live)	4:15

== Personnel ==
Personnel adapted from the album's liner notes.

=== Mumford & Sons ===
- Marcus Mumford
- Ben Lovett
- WN5TN
- Ted Dwane

=== Additional musicians ===
- James Ford – drums, percussion, keyboards
- Tom Hobden – violin
- Thomas Bartlett – keyboards
- Dave Nelson – trombone
- Aaron Dessner – keyboards
- Benjamin Lanz – trombone

=== Technical ===
- James Ford – production
- Jimmy Robertson – engineering
- Laurence Anslow – engineering assistance
- Aaron Dessner – associate production (2–7, 10, 12), additional recording
- Harrison Cargill – additional production (1)
- Robert Orton – mixing
- Tony Lake – additional mixing
- Bob Ludwig – mastering
- Jonathan Low – additional recording
- George Murphy – additional recording

=== Artwork ===
- Ross Stirling – design, photography
- Ted Dwane – photography
- Ty Johnson – additional photography

== Charts ==
=== Weekly charts ===
Chart (2015)	Peak position
Australian Albums (ARIA)	1
Austrian Albums (Ö3 Austria)	2
Belgian Albums (Ultratop Flanders)	2
Belgian Albums (Ultratop Wallonia)	13
Canadian Albums (Billboard)	1
Dutch Albums (Album Top 100)	1
Finnish Albums (Suomen virallinen lista)	10
French Albums (SNEP)	54
German Albums (Offizielle Top 100)	2
Hungarian Albums (MAHASZ)	12
Irish Albums (IRMA)	1
Italian Albums (FIMI)	5
New Zealand Albums (RMNZ)	4
Norwegian Albums (VG-lista)	1
Portuguese Albums (AFP)	3
Scottish Albums (OCC)	1
South African Albums (RISA)	17
Spanish Albums (PROMUSICAE)	6
Swedish Albums (Sverigetopplistan)	2
Swiss Albums (Schweizer Hitparade)	2
UK Albums (OCC)	1
US Billboard 200	1
US Top Rock Albums (Billboard)	1

=== Year-end charts ===
Chart (2015)	Position
Australian Albums (ARIA)	18
Austrian Albums (Ö3 Austria)	46
Belgian Albums (Ultratop Flanders)	16
Belgian Albums (Ultratop Wallonia)	133
Canadian Albums (Billboard)	8
Dutch Albums (MegaCharts)	15
German Albums (Offizielle Top 100)	73
New Zealand Albums (RMNZ)	19
Swedish Albums (Sverigetopplistan)	67
Swiss Albums (Schweizer Hitparade)	50
UK Albums (OCC)	15
US Billboard 200	33
US Top Rock Albums (Billboard)	5

Chart (2016)	Position
Dutch Albums (MegaCharts)	67
UK Albums (OCC)	85
US Top Rock Albums (Billboard)	43

== Certifications and sales ==
Certifications and sales for Wilder Mind
Region	Certification	Certified units/sales
Australia (ARIA)	Platinum	70,000^{‡}
Austria (IFPI Austria)	Platinum	15,000^{*}
Canada (Music Canada)	Platinum	84,000
Denmark (IFPI Danmark)	Gold	10,000^{‡}
Germany (BVMI)	Gold	100,000^{‡}
New Zealand (RMNZ)	Platinum	15,000^{‡}
United Kingdom (BPI)	Platinum	428,704
United States (RIAA)	Platinum	568,000
Summaries
Worldwide	—	1,350,000
^{*} Sales figures based on certification alone.^{‡} Sales+streaming figures based on certification alone.
