= King Charles (musician) =

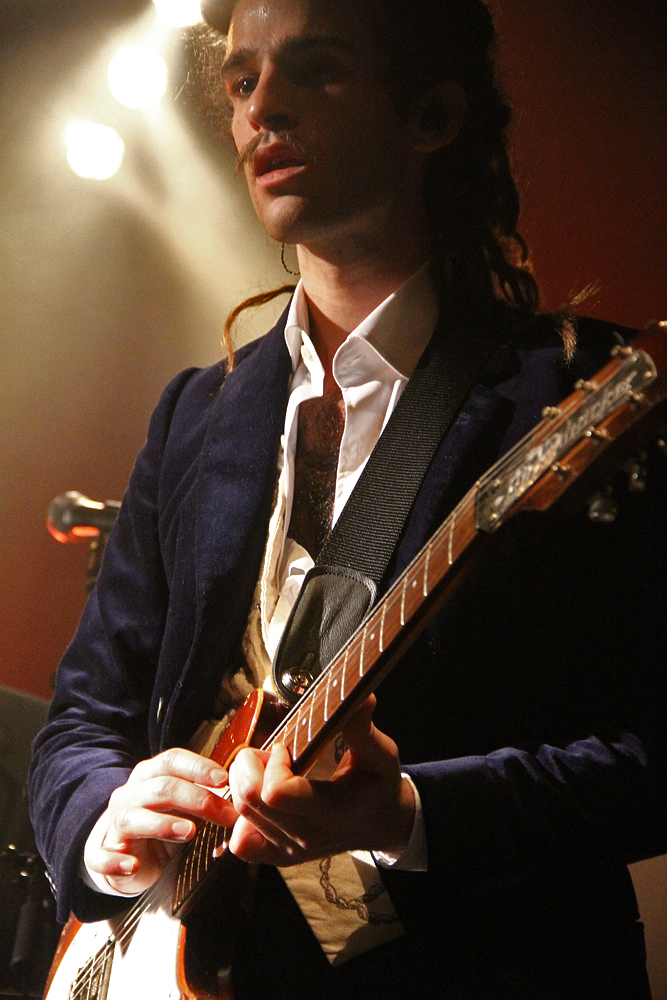

Background information
- Born: Charles Costa
- Origin: London, England
- Genres: Alternative rock, folk rock, surf rock, indie
- Years active: 2007–present
- Labels: Universal Republic, Island, Buffalo Gang

King Charles (born Charles Costa) is an English singer and songwriter.

He plays the guitar, piano and cello. He is also a classically trained singer. He began writing songs at the age of 17.

In 2009, he became the first British person to win the International Songwriting Competition in Nashville, Tennessee, for his song "Love Lust". The competition was judged by Tom Waits, Jeff Beck, Loretta Lynn and Jerry Lee Lewis, and following this King Charles was signed by Universal Republic/Island.

In 2012, he teamed up with the record producer Matthew Wilder and released his first album Loveblood. He released his second album, Gamble for a Rose, in 2016.

In 2020, Costa again worked with Matthew Wilder on Out of my Mind. In April 2020, Clash magazine said "They say the freaks shall inherit the earth, and it will be King Charles who was ordained by god to rule over them".

== Discography ==
=== Studio albums ===
List of studio albums, with selected chart positions
Title	Album details	Peak chart positions		
Title	Album details	UK	FRA	SCO
LoveBlood	Released: 7 May 2012; Label: Island; Format: CD, Digital download	36	168	78
Gamble for a Rose	Released: 22 January 2016; Label: Buffalo Gang; Format: CD, Digital download, LP	—	—	—
Out of My Mind	Released: 17 April 2020; Label: Buffalo Gang; Format: LP, CD, Cassette, Digital download	—	—	—

=== Singles ===
List of singles, with selected chart positions and certifications, showing year released and album name
Title	Year	Peak chart positions		Album
Title	Year	UK	BEL	Album
"Bam Bam"	2011	—	—	LoveBlood
"Love Lust"	2011	—	—	LoveBlood
"Ivory Road"	2011	—	—	LoveBlood
"Mississippi Isabel"	2012	—	84	LoveBlood
"Lov Madiba (feat. Katie Amelia & Shingai Shoniwa)"	2013	—	—	Non-album singles
"Loose Change for the Boatman"	2016	—	—	Gamble for a Rose
"Gamble for a Rose"	2016	—	—	Gamble for a Rose
"Freak"	2016	—	—	Gamble for a Rose
"Out of My Mind"	2019	—	—	Out of My Mind
"Deeper Love"	2019	—	—	Out of My Mind
"Feel These Heavy Times"	2020	—	—	Out of My Mind
"Animal"	2021	—	—	Non-album singles
"12345"	2021	—	—	Non-album singles
"Oh Mama"	2021	—	—	Non-album singles
"A Letter to Her Majesty"	2022	—	—	Non-album singles
"We Didn't Start the Fire"	2022	—	—	Non-album singles
