= Mumford & Sons =

British folk rock band

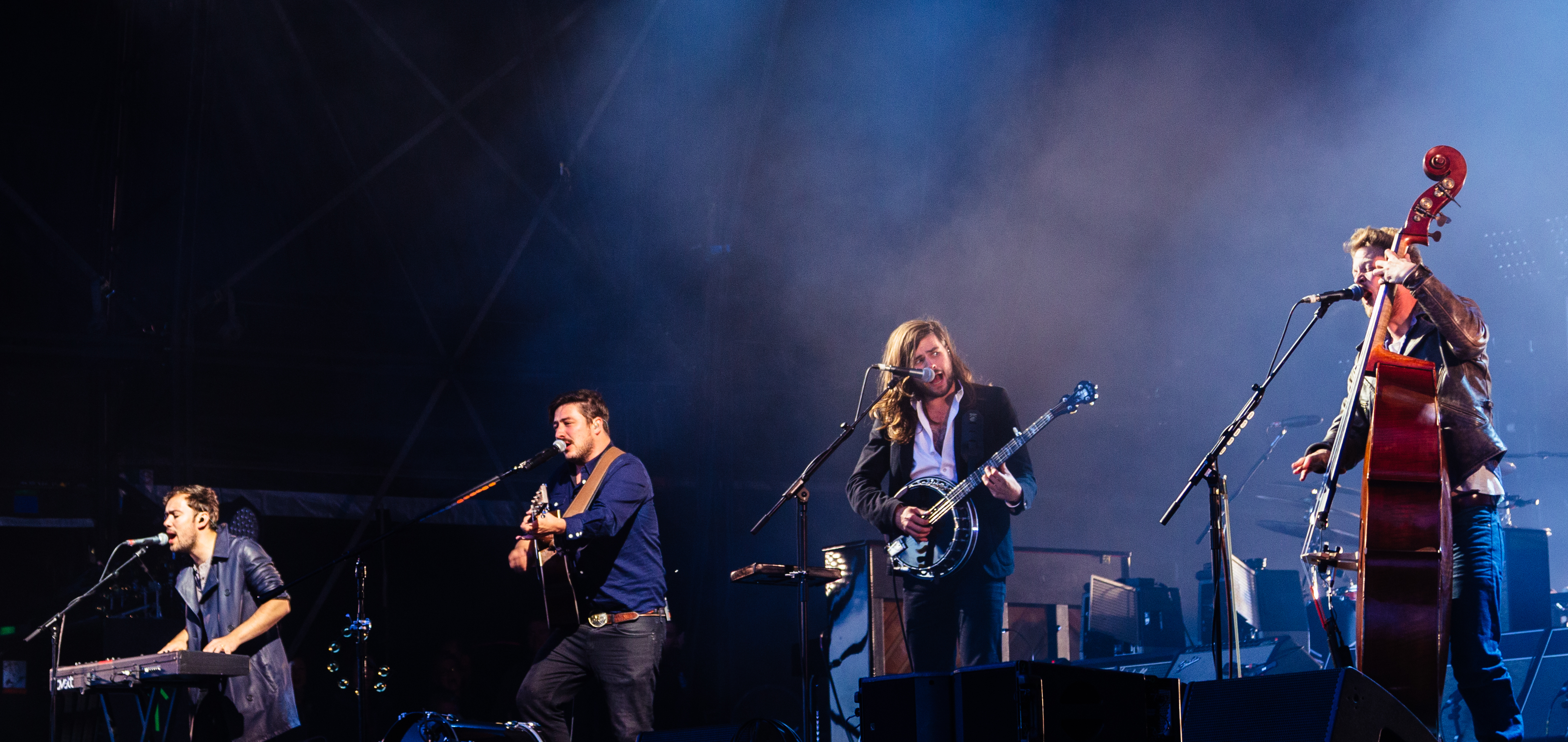
- Mumford & Sons performing in 2015. From left to right: Ben Lovett, Marcus Mumford, Winston Marshall, and Ted Dwane.

Background information
- Origin: London, England
- Genres: Folk rock; alternative rock; indie folk; Americana; country; bluegrass
- Works: Mumford & Sons discography
- Years active: 2007–present
- Labels: Gentlemen of the Road; Island; Glassnote; Dew Process
- Members: Marcus Mumford; Ben Lovett; Ted Dwane
- Past members: Winston Marshall
- Website: mumfordandsons.com

Mumford & Sons are an English folk rock band formed in Greater London. The band consists of Marcus Mumford (lead vocals, guitar, drums), Ben Lovett (vocals, keyboards), and Ted Dwane (vocals, bass, guitar).

Mumford & Sons have released six studio albums: Sigh No More (2009), Babel (2012), Wilder Mind (2015), Delta (2018), Rushmere (2025), and Prizefighter (2026). Their debut, Sigh No More, peaked at number two on the UK Albums Chart and the Billboard 200 in the US, with Babel, Wilder Mind, and Delta all debuting at number one in the US, the former becoming the fastest-selling rock album of the decade and leading to a headline performance at Glastonbury Festival in 2013.

The band has won music awards throughout their career, with Sigh No More earning the band the Brit Award for Best British Album in 2011, a Mercury Prize nomination and six overall Grammy Award nominations. The live performance at the 2011 Grammy ceremony with Bob Dylan and The Avett Brothers led to a surge in popularity for the band in the US. The band received eight total Grammy nominations for Babel and won the Grammy Award for Album of the Year. The band also won the Brit Award for Best British Group in 2013 and an Ivor Novello Award for International Achievement in 2014.

== History ==
=== Early years (2007–2009) ===
Mumford & Sons was formed in December 2007 by multi-instrumentalists Marcus Mumford, Ted Dwane, Ben Lovett, and Winston Marshall. Band members play acoustic guitar, drums, keyboard instruments, bass guitar, and traditional folk instruments such as banjo, mandolin and resonator guitar. The band name originates from Marcus Mumford being the most visible member, organising the band and their performances. Lovett indicated that the name was meant to evoke the sense of an "antiquated family business name".

Mumford and Sons were amongst a handful of similar southern English bands who were increasing their visibility in West London around the same time, giving rise to the label "West London folk scene". Mumford downplays that characterisation as an exaggeration—Mumford & Sons and a few other folk acts just happened to be operating in the same general area at the time. In an interview with the Herald Sun, Marcus Mumford said, "It's not folk really. Well, some of it is, and it's certainly not a scene. Someone got over-excited about a few bands who live in a hundred-mile radius and put it in a box to sell it as a package. It's a community, not a scene. It's not exclusive." Having developed in the same musical and cultural environment, Mumford & Sons' sound has been compared to that of artists such as Noah and the Whale, Johnny Flynn or Laura Marling, whose backing band had included Marshall, Mumford, and Dwane.

In early 2008, the band began working with manager Adam Tudhope, who, as part of management company Everybody's, also represents Keane and Laura Marling. It was through Tudhope's connection that Mumford & Sons was exposed to their future A&R at Island, Louis Bloom, who began monitoring the band. Bloom told HitQuarters that they were still at a fledgling state and not yet ready for a label deal: "There was no one there for it, just a few friends, and they needed time to develop. Over the next six months I kept going to see them and they were literally picking up fans every time."

In February 2008, the band completed an extensive UK tour with support from Alessi's Ark, Sons of Noel and Adrian, Peggy Sue and others. June 2008 marked the band's first appearance at the Glastonbury Festival. They also toured Australia with Laura Marling, whose disinclination to interact with audiences encouraged Mumford into the spotlight. The experience helped inform his attitude towards Mumford & Sons audiences, which is to interact frequently and to try to create a comfortable, casual atmosphere. Mumford & Sons' first project was an EP entitled Love Your Ground which took a year to complete and was released in November 2008 on Chess Club Records.

=== Sigh No More and Babel (2009–2014) ===
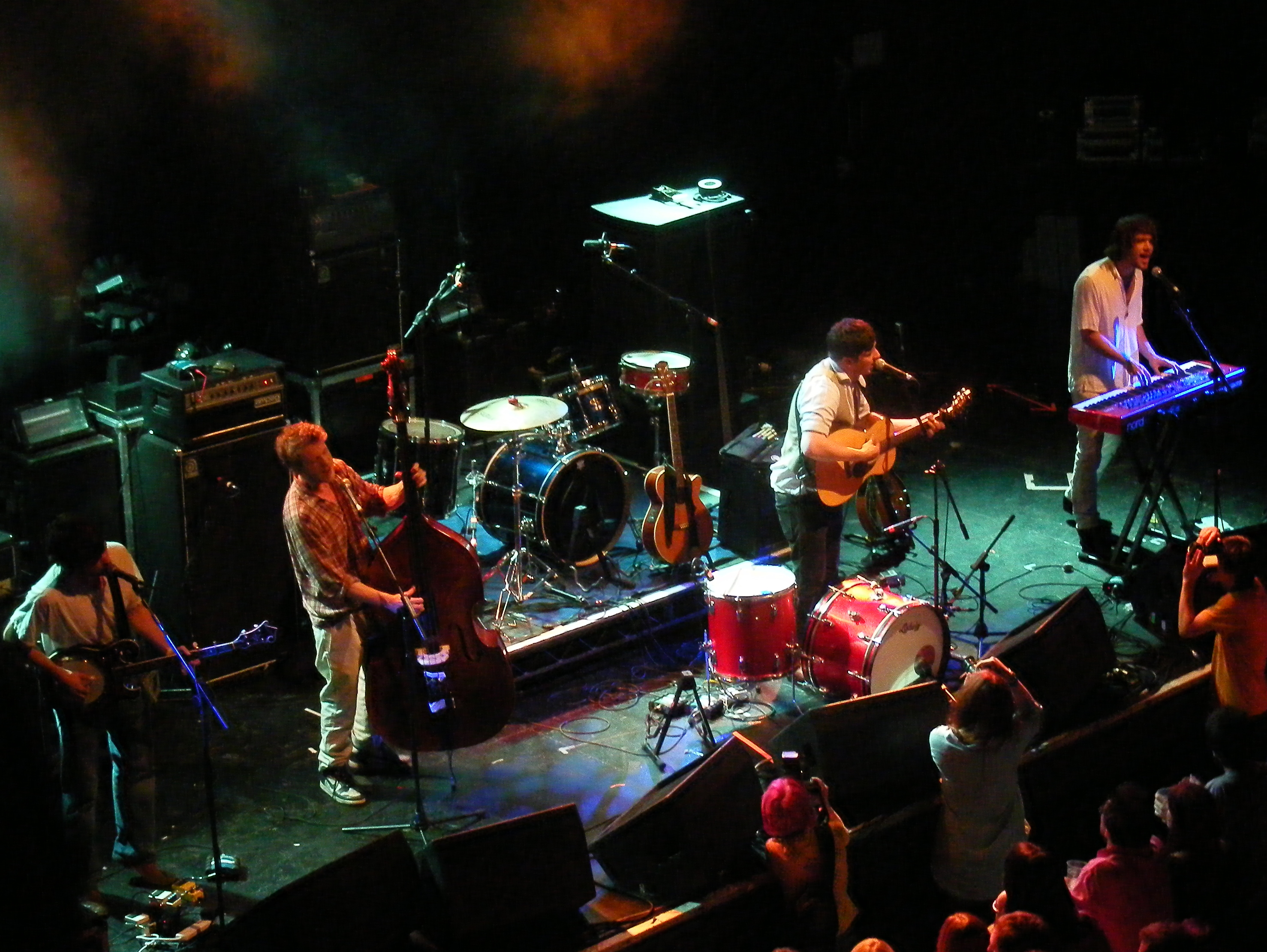
Mumford & Sons performing at Dot to Dot Festival in Bristol on 23 May 2009

Throughout 2008 and into 2009, Mumford & Sons performed in small to moderate venues in the UK and US, exposing audiences to Love Your Ground tracks and other material that would eventually become Sigh No More. The band finally recorded Sigh No More with Markus Dravs, who had produced albums with artists such as Arcade Fire. At the time, band members did not even own their own instruments—Dravs initially turned them away when they showed up at the recording sessions empty-handed. The only track from Love Your Ground to be included on Sigh No More was "Little Lion Man". The band told the Herald Sun that they self-financed the album to avoid the artistic and technical compromises that sometimes befall studio-financed projects. They toured again in support of Laura Marling in 2009, and Mumford & Sons contributed musicians to her 2010 album I Speak Because I Can.

In August 2009, Mumford & Sons signed a licensing deal to Island Records in the UK, to Dew Process in Australia and New Zealand, to Glassnote Records in North America and Cooperative Music in the rest of the world, and through its own label Gentlemen of the Road. Dew Process boss Paul Piticco signed the band after witnessing a US performance in 2009 and appreciating their "honest" approach and unique sound. Their debut album was released on 5 October 2009 with "Little Lion Man" as the lead single. Dave Berry of XFM named "Little Lion Man" his record of the week, and in another interview with the band, Berry said "Screw 'of the week', it's my favourite track of the year." BBC Radio 1 DJ Zane Lowe made "Little Lion Man" his "Reaction Record" on 27 July 2009, before naming it the "Hottest Record in the World" the following evening.

In their first performance on US network television, the band played "Little Lion Man" on CBS's Late Show with David Letterman on 17 February 2010. This appearance was followed by a performance of "The Cave" on The Late Late Show with Craig Ferguson on 26 February 2010. Mumford & Sons have been commercially successful in Australia and New Zealand. By January 2010, "Little Lion Man" topped the Triple J Hottest 100 list for all of 2009, with its margin of victory the largest in the history of the chart. In November 2010, the band won an ARIA Music Award for Most Popular International Artist. Sigh No More first reached number 9 on the New Zealand charts in October 2010, and subsequently topped the chart in January 2011 due to the popularity of the singles from the album.

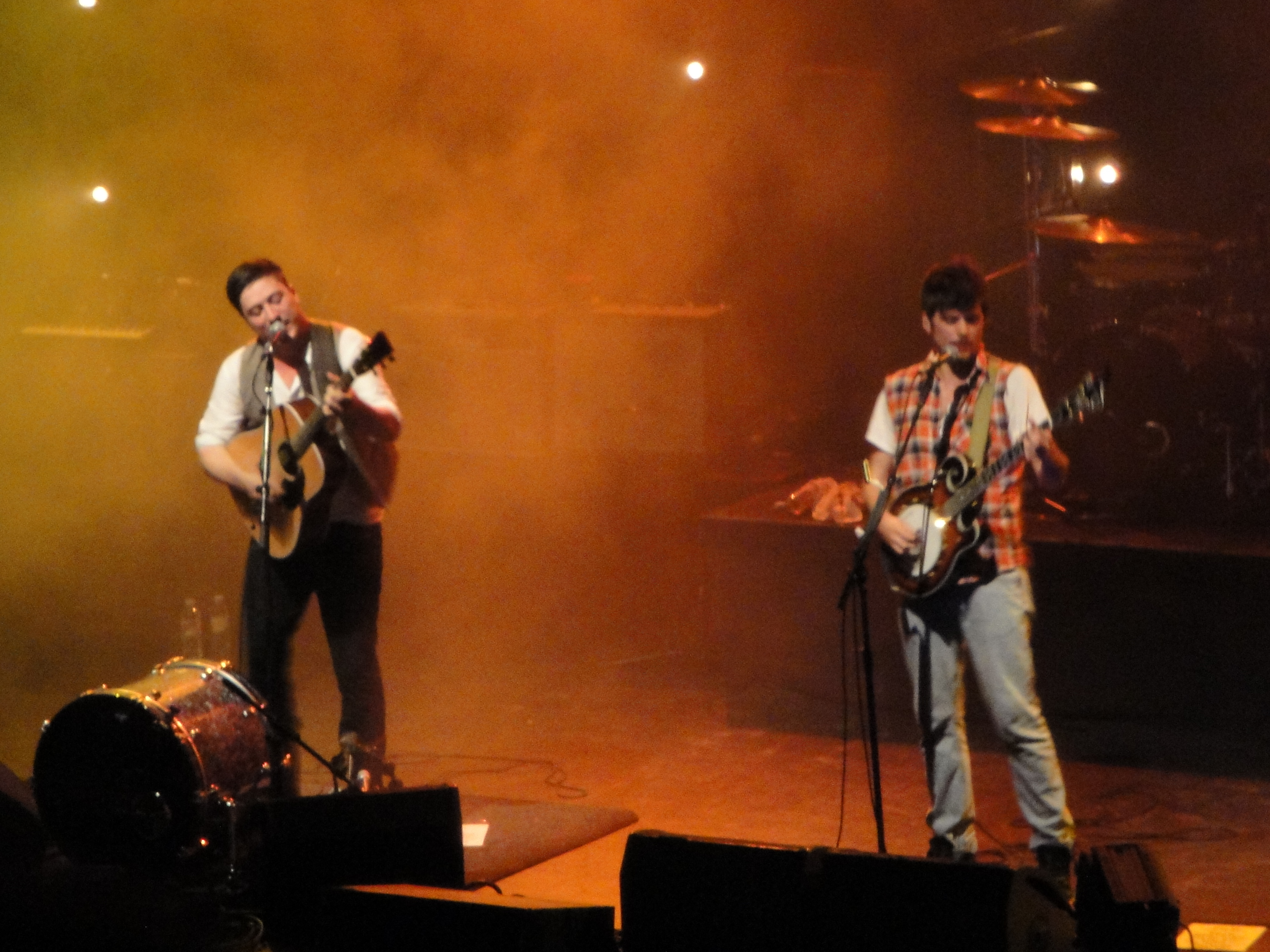
Marcus Mumford and Winston Marshall on stage in Brighton, 4 October 2010

In a March 2010 interview, Ray Davies announced that Mumford & Sons would be appearing on his forthcoming collaborations album. Marcus Mumford confirmed this in an interview the same month, stating, "I am more excited about that than I have been about anything before in my life". Mumford & Sons performed the track "Days/This Time Tomorrow" along with Davies on 12 February 2010 on Later... with Jools Holland on the BBC. In December 2010, Mumford & Sons earned Grammy Award nominations for Best New Artist and Best Rock Song ("Little Lion Man"). While they did not go on to win an award, the band performed their single "The Cave" at the Grammy ceremony. The performance earned positive media attention and boosted visibility for Sigh No More—US sales increased by 99% in the period following the ceremony in February 2011. The album subsequently peaked at number two on the UK Albums Chart and the Billboard 200 in the US.

On 7 December 2010, in collaboration with Dharohar Project and Laura Marling, Mumford & Sons released an EP album recorded in Delhi, India. The album was recorded in a makeshift studio with traditional Rajasthani musicians and features four collaborations, including multicultural mash-ups of Marling's "Devil's Spoke" and Mumford & Sons' "To Darkness." Sigh No More is certified 4× Platinum in the UK, and 2× Platinum in the US. The band continued to grow in popularity in 2011, winning several major awards and headlining larger shows and festivals. In February 2011, they received a European Border Breakers Award for their international success. They received a Brit Award for British Album of the Year with Sigh No More and performed "Timshel" at the ceremony. UK sales of the album subsequently increased by 266 per cent. While touring the United States in early 2011, the band began writing songs for the follow-up album. Keyboardist Ben Lovett credited the creative atmosphere of Nashville, Tennessee with easing the songwriting process. While performing in Kansas City, Missouri on 3 June, the first stop of their US tour, the band announced they had been recording a new album, initially set to be released in late 2011.

In April 2011, the group joined Old Crow Medicine Show and Edward Sharpe and the Magnetic Zeros on the inaugural Railroad Revival Tour, which was inspired by the Festival Express tour across Canada in 1970 that included Buddy Guy, Janis Joplin, The Grateful Dead and The Band. Travelling exclusively in vintage rail cars, the three bands performed in six "unique outdoor locations" over the course of a week starting in Oakland, California. Ketch Secor of Old Crow told American Songwriter that "It's like we left all our baggage at home and just brought our instruments", often writing new songs while on the train. "We were just on these old rattling rails. It was a railroad odyssey that would have made Woody and Doc tip their hats and blow their whistles," he says. They appear in the musical documentary Big Easy Express, directed by Emmett Malloy, being made of the trip which premiered March 2012 at the South by Southwest Film Conference and Festival (SXSW Film) in Austin, Texas—winning the Headliner Audience Award. The film went on to win "Best Long Form Video" at the 2013 Grammy Awards. Mumford & Sons played at the Glastonbury Festival on Friday 24 June 2011, and then embarked on a North American tour on which they frequently performed songs from the upcoming album. They recorded two songs for Andrea Arnold's adaptation of Wuthering Heights, one of which (entitled "Enemy") is featured during the closing credits. In June 2012, Mumford & Sons contributed the song "Learn Me Right" with Birdy to the Pixar film Brave.

Mumford & Sons released their second studio album Babel on 24 September 2012, with a track listing of 12 songs, and a deluxe edition containing three exclusive songs. The lead single "I Will Wait" premiered on Zane Lowe's BBC Radio 1 show on 7 August. On 29 August 2012, Mumford & Sons recorded their concert at Red Rocks Amphitheatre in Colorado. The Concert was later released on DVD, Vinyl and on iTunes as "Road to Red Rocks". The performance of "I Will Wait" from the concert was released ahead of the DVD on 9 September as the band's official video for the song. On 22 September 2012, the band performed two songs from the new album, "I Will Wait" and "Below My Feet", on Saturday Night Live.

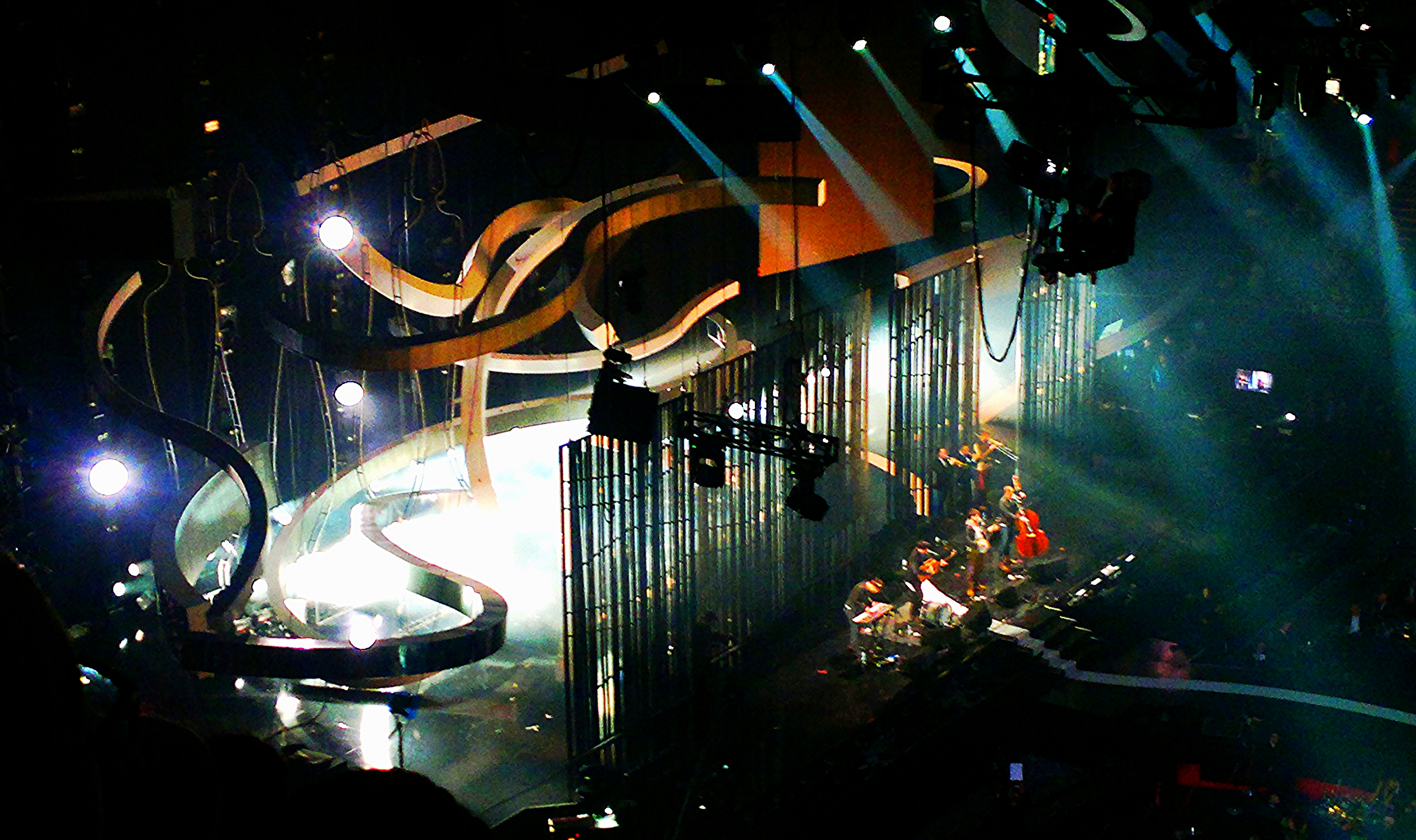
Mumford & Sons performing at the 2013 Brit Awards held at the O2 Arena in London, 20 February 2013

Babel debuted at number one on the UK Albums Chart and the US Billboard 200. It became the fastest selling album of 2012 in the UK, selling over 158,000 copies in its first week, and was the biggest selling debut of any album in 2012 in the US, selling 600,000 in its first week, and over a million worldwide. Babel was also nominated for a Brit Award and a Grammy Award and won the latter. In December 2012, Winston Marshall told NME that the band was rehearsing and writing for their next album. The first phase of a 2013 world tour in support of Babel was released in November 2012. Their Gentlemen of the Road tour continued through 2013. After performing two shows on 8 & 9 June 2013 at the Austin360 Amphitheater in Austin, Texas, bassist Ted Dwane checked into a hospital the next day. Surgeons found a blood clot on the surface of his brain and performed surgery to remove it. Heeding medical advice to aid Dwane's recovery, the band cancelled the rest of its Summer Stampede Tour, including performances at the 2013 Bonnaroo Music Festival and returned to the UK. Dwane's surgery was successful, and his recovery was such that the band was able to headline the 2013 Glastonbury Festival on 30 June, with the band receiving acclaim for their performance.

After first including select stopover cities in their 2012 Tour, the band again selected five cities in Canada, the UK and US to host a two-day festival with shows on multiple stages as well as various other activities and performances. The first stopover of the 2013 Gentleman of the Road tour was in Lewes, East Sussex, from 19 to 20 July. Next was Simcoe, Ontario from 23 to 24 August, followed by Troy, Ohio from 30 to 31 August. The band rounded out their tour with stopovers in Guthrie, Oklahoma on 6 and 7 September and finally St. Augustine, Florida on 13 and 14 September. The Vaccines, Edward Sharpe & the Magnetic Zeros, Vampire Weekend, Old Crow Medicine Show, Yacht Club DJs, Alabama Shakes and various other bands also performed at many of the stopovers throughout the tour. After the end of the Babel tour, Mumford and Sons took a five-month break before returning to the studio in February 2014 to start work on their third album.

=== Wilder Mind and Delta (2015–2020) ===
On 27 February 2015, the band released a short video teasing new live material, promising a further announcement on 2 March 2015. It was revealed on 2 March 2015 that the third studio album from the band was to be entitled Wilder Mind and would be released on 4 May 2015, with the first single "Believe" scheduled for release to radio stations on 9 March and available to download straight after. The announcement also confirmed a new series of Gentleman of the Road Stopovers festivals for Summer 2015. Mumford & Sons made their live return at the 375 capacity Oslo venue in Hackney, London on 10 March 2015 with an intimate show for family and friends. The band played again to fans on the following two nights, debuting songs from Wilder Mind. The second single from Wilder Mind, "The Wolf" premiered on BBC Radio 1 on 9 April 2015, and was made available to download straight after, with the official audio being uploaded to the band's YouTube channel. The official video, a live video of the band performing the song, was uploaded to YouTube on 13 April 2015.

Mumford & Sons confirmed their return on 14 January 2015 with the announcement of a headline performance at the 2015 Bonnaroo Music Festival. Mumford and Sons headlined the Reading & Leeds Festivals in 2015. In the following weeks, many other dates were added to their 2015 UK & Ireland tour. On 30 April 2015, the band announced an intimate show at Brighton Corn Exchange exclusively to members of their mailing list. The gig took place on 1 May 2015. Mumford & Sons promoted their new album with several TV appearances and radio broadcasts, including a Live Lounge special for BBC Radio 1, The Graham Norton Show, Saturday Night Live on NBC, Later... with Jools Holland on the BBC the Late Show with David Letterman, and live streamed concerts for iHeartRadio and SiriusXM. On 13 April 2015, the band announced a 16-date North America tour in-between summer festival dates; the tour started on 2 June 2015 in Brooklyn, New York.

For Record Store Day on 18 April 2015, the band released the coordinates of stores where fans could attend to listen to Wilder Mind in full on vinyl record, over two weeks before its release. The band also released a limited edition 7" record of "Believe"/"The Wolf" for the event. Wilder Mind was released 4 May 2015. Wilder Mind debuted at number one in the UK, the US and Australia. On 17 June 2016, Mumford & Sons released an EP titled Johannesburg.

On 20 September 2018, the band released a new single, "Guiding Light", introducing their new album titled Delta on BBC Radio 1. The second single, "If I Say", was released on 25 October. Delta was released on 16 November 2018, with appearances from Maggie Rogers, Yebba, and Gill Landry. The LP was produced by Paul Epworth, and was recorded mainly at The Church Studios in London. On 14 October 2019 Mumford & Sons was announced as a headliner at Okeechobee Music & Arts Festival. On 23 October 2019, the band released "Blind Leading the Blind", a song that was recorded during the Delta sessions but was not completed in time for the album. To commemorate the end of the Delta Tour, which was cut short by the COVID-19 pandemic, the band released a six-track live EP titled Delta Tour EP, which consisted of various live recordings from the tour. The release included live covers of "Hurt" by Nine Inch Nails, "Blood" by the Middle East, and "With a Little Help from My Friends" by the Beatles. Featured guest artists included Gang of Youths and the Milk Carton Kids. The band also released an early demo of the Delta track "Forever", subtitled "garage version", on 8 May 2020.

=== Marshall's departure and Mumford's solo album (2021–2022) ===
In March 2021, Marshall praised Andy Ngo on Twitter for his 2021 book Unmasked, which is deeply critical of the antifa movement, saying "Congratulations @MrAndyNgo. Finally had the time to read your important book. You're a brave man". Marshall's tweet received backlash and criticism on social media. Following this, Marshall apologised and announced he was taking time away from the band. On 24 June 2021, Marshall stated that his apology had been made to minimise the impact on the band at large. In his published statement he rejected being labelled as far-right for his recommendation of a book critical of the far-left, saying that to call him a fascist was "ludicrous beyond belief" and blasting the far-right as "equally abhorrent" as the far-left. He announced that he was leaving Mumford & Sons so that he could speak his mind on controversial issues without his bandmates and their families suffering the consequences.

On 16 September 2022, Mumford released his debut solo studio album, Self-Titled. The record was preceded by three singles: "Cannibal", "Grace", and "Better Off High". In late November 2022, Mumford teased a new studio album from the band, stating that "the next thing really is to get in the room with the boys in the band and start playing each other the songs we've written." The band debuted a new song, "Maybe", live on 26 August 2023 at Beach Road Weekend Festival. On 16 January 2024, the band released "Good People", a collaboration with Pharrell Williams. The single marks the band's first new music release since the departure of Marshall.

=== Rushmere and Prizefighter (2025–present) ===
Mumford & Sons released their first album in seven years, Rushmere, on 28 March 2025. The announcement was made in January alongside an official trailer including snippets of new music and behind-the-scenes studio footage. Its lead single, also titled "Rushmere" was released two days later, on 17 January. The band went on to confirm that the track and album were co-produced by Dave Cobb. The band relaunched the Railroad Revival Tour in the summer of 2025, playing venues along the East Coast of the United States alongside other folk musicians.

On 29 October 2025, Mumford & Sons announced their sixth album, Prizefighter, which was released 20 February 2026. The announcement was made alongside an audio trailer made up of snippets of music from the new album, and shortly following the release of a single from the album entitled "Rubber Band Man" featuring Hozier. Additional guest artists on the album include Gracie Abrams, Chris Stapleton, and Gigi Perez.

== Musical style and development ==
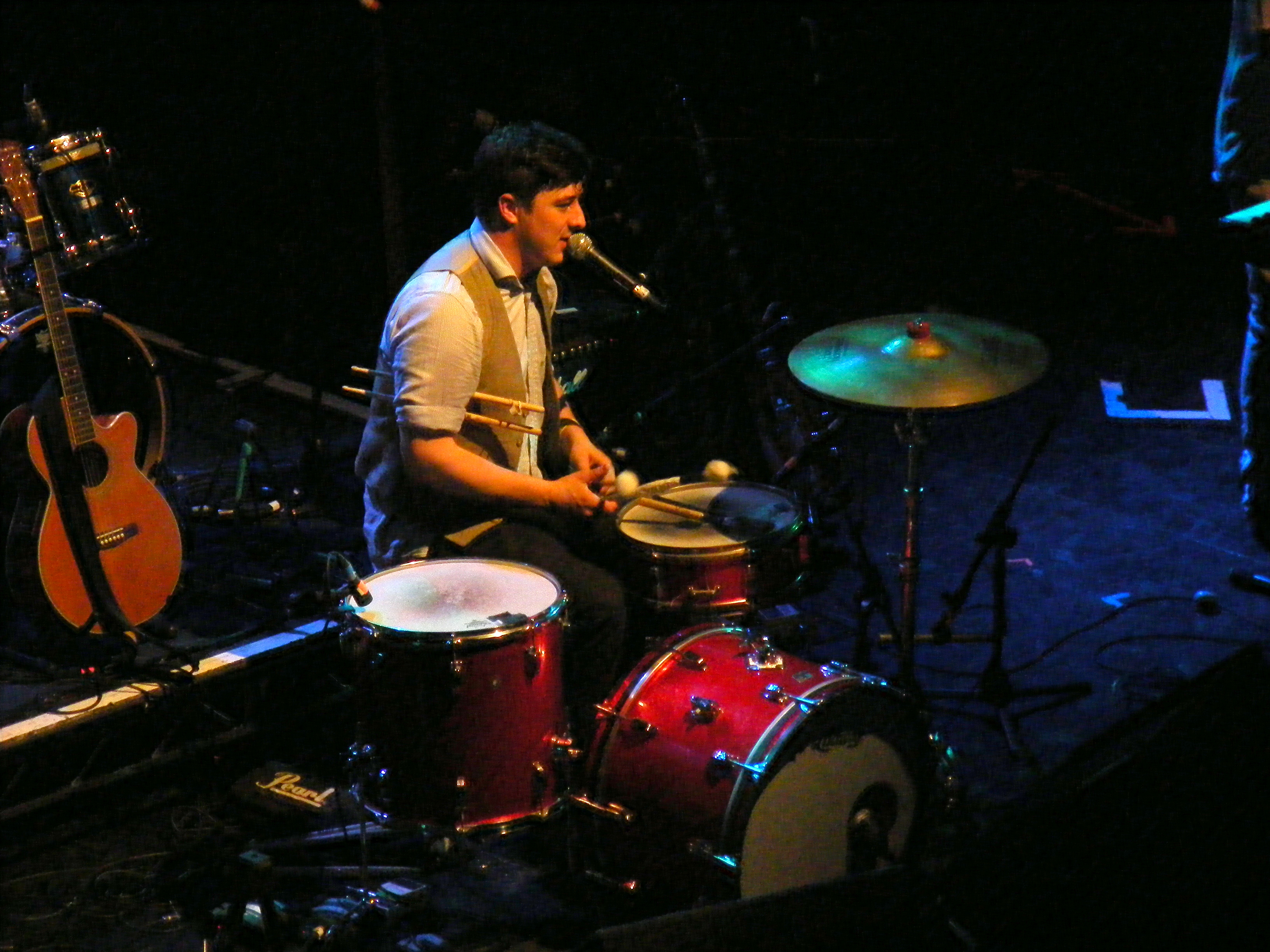
The band members play multiple instruments in live performances. Here Marcus Mumford sits at a drum kit.

Mumford & Sons have been described by The Hollywood Reporter and Forbes as a folk rock band. They began by using bluegrass and folk instrumentation, with the core instruments of acoustic guitar, banjo, piano and a double bass, played with a rhythmic style based in alternative rock and folk. In the documentary Big Easy Express, Marcus Mumford recognises the Old Crow Medicine Show influence: "I first heard Old Crow's music when I was, like, 16, 17, and that really got me into, like, folk music, bluegrass. I mean, I'd listened to a lot of Dylan, but I hadn't really ventured into the country world so much. So Old Crow was the band that made me fall in love with country music." Mumford acknowledges that "the band inspired them to pick up the banjo and start their now famous country nights in London." Ketch Secor, Old Crow front-man, concurs: "Those boys took the message and ran with it."

Emmylou Harris was "among the gateway artists who helped Mumford and bandmates Ben Lovett, Ted Dwane and Winston Marshall discover their love for American roots music. It started with the 'O Brother, Where Art Thou?' soundtrack ... That eventually led them to the Old Crow Medicine Show and then deep immersion in old-timey sounds from America's long-neglected past."

Much of Mumford & Sons' lyrical content has a strong literary influence, their debut album name deriving from a line in William Shakespeare's Much Ado About Nothing. The track "Sigh No More" includes lines from the play such as Serve God love me and mend, For man is a giddy thing, and One foot in sea and one on shore. The title of the song "Roll Away Your Stone" is an allusion to Macbeth; the song includes the line Stars hide your fires/ And these here are my desires which borrows and pares down Macbeth's line in act 1, scene 4: Stars, hide your fires,/ Let not light see my black and deep desires. Additionally, "The Cave" includes several references to The Odyssey, in particular the sirens that Odysseus encounters on his journey home. The song also contains many references to G. K. Chesterton's book, St. Francis of Assisi, in which Chesterton uses Plato's Cave as a way of explaining how St. Francis views the world from God's perspective. Both "Timshel" and "Dust Bowl Dance" draw heavily from the John Steinbeck novels Of Mice and Men, East of Eden and The Grapes of Wrath.

The band's change in sound on their third album was described by Lovett as a "natural departure". At the end of the Babel tour Winston Marshall traded his banjo for electric guitar in sound checks and Mumford started playing more drums as the band jammed on heavy instrumentals and even some Radiohead tunes. Banjo, an instrument that had become synonymous with the band, does not feature on the record. NME reported that the band's sound is "More expansive than ever and decidedly heavier, thanks to the shift in instrumentation." The group also employed a full drumkit instead of kick drum. "We've had our standard line-up of instruments for the last six years and we felt like that was our palette, [but] we started picking up other stuff," said Lovett. "It's a very natural departure from some of that rootsier stuff."

Lovett told NME that working with James Ford for Wilder Mind was part of trying something new. "We felt a need for change. Not from Markus [Dravs], but he was so closely attached to those first two records that as we had taken that time off, we wanted to try doing something new. It felt like, if we do our third record with Markus, does that mean we do our ninth and 10th records with Markus? At some point you have to try different things, as we collectively felt like it was time to try other stuff. Markus knows that we might well make the next record with him. We definitely haven't broken up [with Dravs], we're just playing the field!"

=== Lyrical themes ===
Many of Mumford & Sons' songs seem to be "laden with the themes and imagery of faith – often drawing specifically upon the Christian tradition." Songs that have been emphasised as correlating with Christian elements include "Believe", "Guiding Light" and "Roll Away Your Stone". The band's lead singer, Marcus Mumford, was also raised in a devout Christian home, with his parents, Eleanor and John Mumford leading the Vineyard Church in the United Kingdom and Ireland. However, when questioned about their Christian affiliation, Mumford was quick to push away from any form of religious adherence, stating, "I wouldn't call myself a Christian... I've kind of separated myself from the culture of Christianity... [but my] spiritual journey is a work in progress." Later, Mumford reaffirmed this position on behalf of the band, responding to a question about whether the band's songs relate to Mumford's journey back to the Christian faith of his childhood by stating, "It's not about that all, sorry! I don't even call myself a Christian. Spirituality is the word we engage with more. We're fans of faith, not religion."

== Other ventures ==
In 2009, the band founded Gentlemen of the Road, a live promotions company, record label and organiser of the global series of Stopover Festivals. These festivals tend to take place in towns and villages not normally toured in by bands or singers in an effort to bring money to the place and help businesses there. The band handpicks the supporting acts which play for the Stopover Festivals. These include bands such as Foo Fighters, The Flaming Lips, The Vaccines, The Maccabees and Jenny Lewis, amongst others.

== Members ==
Current members

- Marcus Mumford – lead vocals, guitar, drums, banjo, mandolin (2007–present)
- Ben Lovett – piano, keyboards, accordion, backing vocals (2007–present)
- Ted Dwane – double bass, bass guitar, guitar, drums, backing vocals (2007–present)

Current touring musicians

In alphabetical order by surname

- Andrew Barr – drums
- Laura Bibbs – trumpet
- Darius Christian – trombone
- Griffin Goldsmith - drums
- Matt Menefee – banjo, guitar, keyboards
- Kyle Resnick – trumpet
- Ryan Richter – guitar
- Enrique Sanchez – trumpet

Former members

- Winston Marshall – banjo, guitar, backing vocals (2007–2021)

Former touring musicians

In alphabetical order by surname

- Chris Allan – cello
- Ivan Bunyard – drums
- Will Calderbank – cello
- Harrison Cargill – guitar, mandolin
- Dan Carpenter – trumpet
- Joe Clegg – drums, percussion
- Nick Etwell – trumpet, flugelhorn, keyboards (2015)
- Richard Freeman – trumpet
- Mario Gotoh – violin
- Tom Hobden – fiddle, guitar (2015)
- Ross Holmes – fiddle
- Davie Knott – trombone
- Oli Langford – fiddle
- Ben Lanz – trumpet
- Chris Maas – drums (2015)
- Raymond James Mason – trombone
- Rob Moose – violin, mandolin (2011–2013)
- Ephraim Owens – trumpet
- Michael Siddell – violin
- Caitlin Sullivan – cello
- Dave Williamson – trombone, keyboards, percussion (2015)

== Discography ==
- Sigh No More (2009)
- Babel (2012)
- Wilder Mind (2015)
- Delta (2018)
- Rushmere (2025)
- Prizefighter (2026)

== Tours ==
- Sigh No More Tour (2009–12)
- Railroad Revival Tour (2011, 2025)
- Babel Tour (2012–13)
- Wilder Mind Tour (2015–18)
- Delta Tour (2018–20)
- Summer Tour '23
- Rushmere Tour (2025)
- Prizefighter Tour (2026)

== Awards and nominations ==
Mumford & Sons have been awarded the following honours:

- ARIA Music Awards 2010, Most Popular International Artist
- Q Awards 2010, Best New Act
- UK Festival Awards 2010, Breakthrough Artist
- Americana Music Honors & Awards 2011, Emerging Artist of the Year
- Billboard Music Award 2011, Top Rock Album (for Sigh No More)
- Billboard Music Award 2011, Top Alternative Album (for Sigh No More)
- Billboard Music Award 2011, Top Alternative Artist
- Brit Awards 2011, British Album of the Year (for Sigh No More)
- Billboard Music Awards 2013, Top Rock Album (for Babel)
- Brit Awards 2013, British Group
- Echo Music Prize 2013, International Rock/Pop Group
- Grammy Award 2013, Album of the Year (for Babel)
- Grammy Award 2013, Best Music Film (for Big Easy Express)
- Juno Award 2013, International Album of the Year
- Ivor Novello Awards 2014, International Achievement
- UK Americana Awards 2018, Trailblazer Award
