= Ben Lovett (British musician) =

Welsh musician and producer (born 1986)

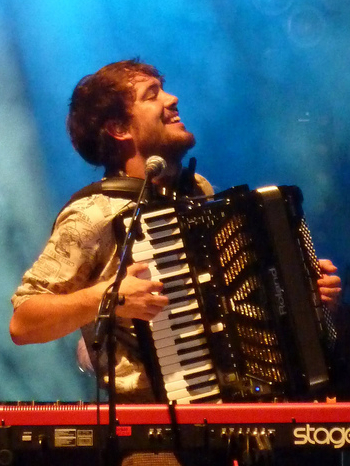
- Ben Lovett on 28 September 2010

Background information
- Born: Benjamin Walter David Lovett; 30 September 1986 (age 40); Cardiff, Wales
- Origin: Wimbledon, London; England, United Kingdom
- Genres: Folk rock; indie folk
- Occupations: Musician; songwriter
- Instruments: Piano; keyboards; accordion; vocals; guitar; drums; percussion
- Years active: 2007–present
- Labels: Island; Universal; Glassnote
- Spouse: Jemima Janney (m. 2015; div. 2016)

Benjamin Walter David Lovett (born 30 September 1986) is a British musician and producer, best known for being a member of the British folk rock band Mumford & Sons.

== Music career ==
=== Mumford and Sons ===
Lovett is one of the founding members of the band Mumford & Sons. He studied in Hallfield School in Birmingham before moving to London. Later, he attended King's College School in Wimbledon where he met Marcus Mumford. He met fellow band members, Ted Dwane and Winston Marshall, in London. He primarily plays keyboard and piano within the group, but also sings backing vocals and plays accordion, drums, guitar and percussion on the group's songs.

The band has four full-length studio albums, Sigh No More (2009), which earned them a number of Grammy Awards nominations in 2010 and 2011 and won the Brit Award for Best British Album in 2011, and Babel (2012) which won the band the Grammy Award for Album of the Year, their third album, Wilder Mind, released in May 2015, and Delta, released in November 2018. In 2013 the group won the Brit Award for Best British Group.

=== Other ventures ===
In the early days of Mumford & Sons, Lovett produced albums for folk bands around London, including Peggy Sue.

Lovett produced on Ellie Goulding's critically acclaimed 2010 album Lights, including Goulding's cover of the Elton John track "Your Song" which peaked at no. 2 on the singles chart. As well as being credited as a producer on the album, Lovett is also credited with playing kick drum, piano and singing backing vocals on the release, which debuted at no. 1 on the UK album charts. Lovett has previously joined Goulding on stage to play piano on "Your Song" and the pair have recorded duets of Service Bell by Feist and Grizzly Bear and Two Dancers by Wild Beasts, which Lovett aired whilst presenting on Triple J radio.

Lovett also assisted the production of the self-titled debut solo album of former Felice Brothers member Simon Felice throughout 2011. Lovett was credited as a producer on the release and also featured as a guest on the lead single from the album, "You & I Belong".

Lovett is the founder of TVG, a company that designs music and entertainment venues. He is also co-founder of record label and live music promotion team, Communion. The aim of the label is to create a "platform for an unsigned music scene in the main cities". The label has showcased and released the music of a number of notable artists, including Gotye, Michael Kiwanuka, Joy Vance and Ben Howard. In 2026, Lovett expanded TVG's footprint with real estate and ancillary businesses including a cocktail and omakase-style sushi bar in the Chinatown neighbourhood of Los Angeles called Mitsi, alongside Pacific Electric, a music venue on the same block so patrons could move between live performances and the sushi counter without leaving the premises. Chef Jon Kim leads the kitchen at Mitsi. Other TVG-managed venues include Omeara in Bankside, London, Saturn in Birmingham, Alabama, and the Orion Amphitheater in Huntsville, Alabama.

== Personal life ==
Lovett publicly announced his engagement to his long time girlfriend, fashion designer Jemima Janney, on 20 July 2014. They married in 2015 and divorced in late 2016. During Mumford and Sons' promo for their 4th album, "Delta", he described the album as "the four Ds: death, divorce, drugs and depression".

Lovett is currently in a romantic relationship with Molly Howard, referring to her as his girlfriend in a post on Facebook. On 5 June 2021, Howard announced on Instagram that she had given birth to the couple's first child. Withers announced on withers.ft.com the birth of their first child.
