= Ted Dwane =

British musician and photographer

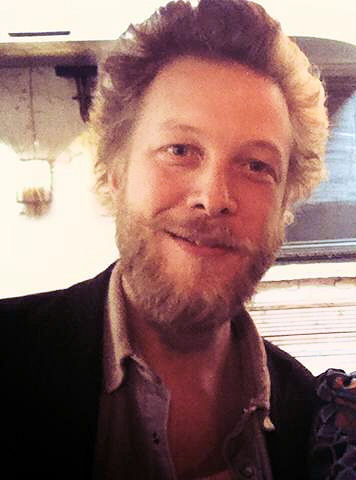
- Ted Dwane of Mumford & Sons at the Londonewcastle Project Space for A Show of Faces, November 2013.

Background information
- Born: Edward James Milton Dwane; 15 August 1984 (age 42); London, England
- Genres: Folk rock; indie folk
- Occupations: Musician; songwriter
- Instruments: Vocals; double bass; bass guitar; guitar; drums
- Years active: 2007–present
- Labels: Island (UK); Universal (Canada and Australia); Glassnote (US)
- Member of: Mumford & Sons
- Formerly of: Moulettes
- Website: www.teddwane.com

Edward James Milton Dwane (born 15 August 1984) is a British musician and photographer, best known for being the bassist of the British folk rock band Mumford & Sons. Before this he was the bassist in experimental folk band Moulettes.

== Music career ==
Dwane is a founding member of the British folk band Mumford & Sons. He plays the double bass, bass guitar, drums, guitar and provides backing vocals. Dwane performed with two of his current band members, Marcus Mumford and Winston Marshall, with Laura Marling before Mumford & Sons.

== Photography ==
Dwane is a keen photographer and has a photography blog on the Mumford & Sons website. Dwane held his first solo photography exhibition, A Show of Faces, from 16 to 24 November 2013 in Shoreditch, London.

== Health ==
On 31 May 2013, whilst performing at the Greek Theatre Berkeley, Dwane had an acute subdural hematoma which went undiagnosed for over a week. Dwane went on to perform six gigs before finally being correctly diagnosed and treated in Austin on 11 June. He was discharged on 13 June after a successful operation. Mumford & Sons had to cancel three performances in America including the 2013 Bonnaroo Music Festival so Dwane could fully recover. Touring for the band resumed three weeks later for their headline slot at Glastonbury Festival.
