= Winston Marshall =

British musician (born 1987)

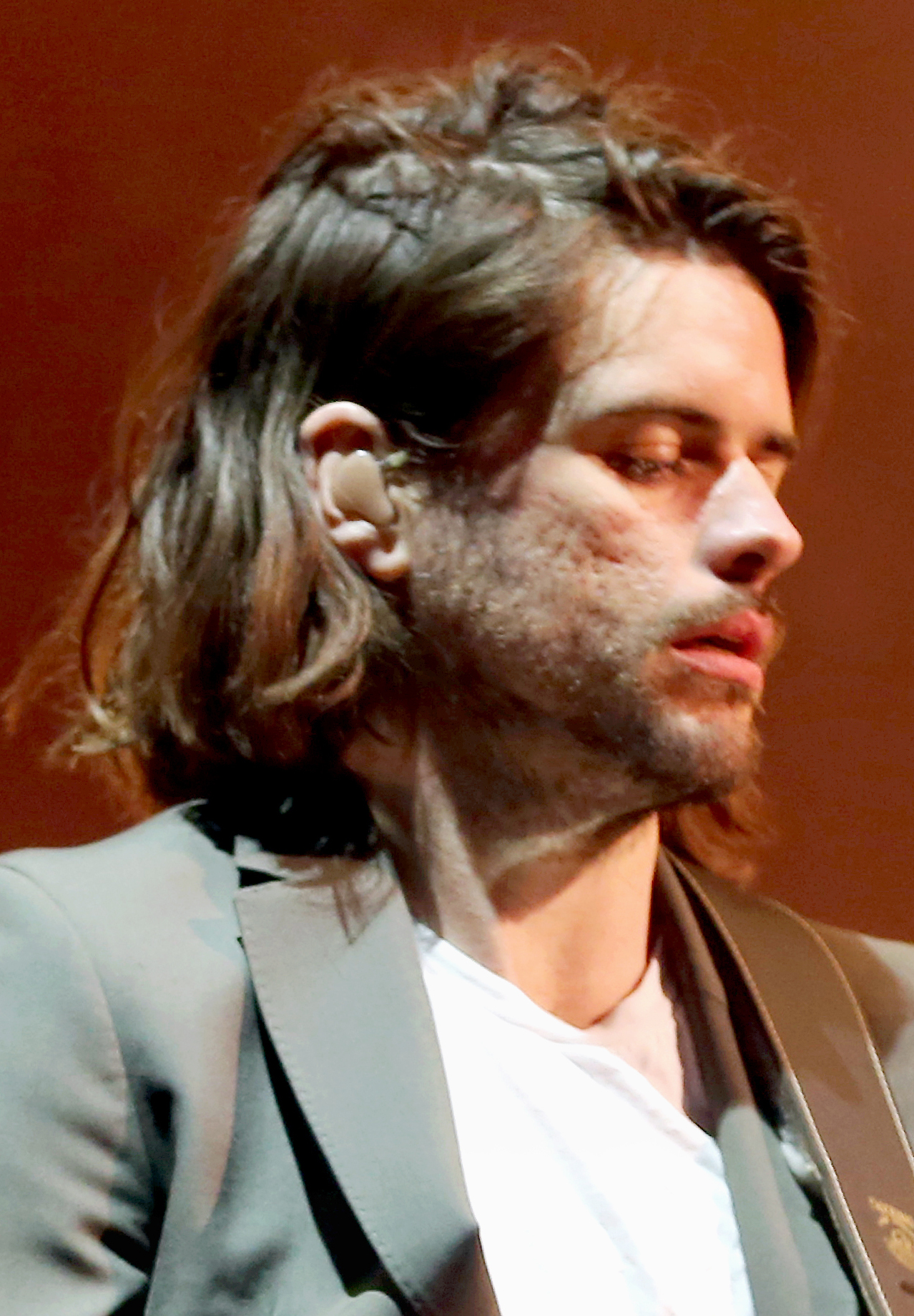
- Marshall in 2019
- Born: Winston Aubrey Aladar Marshall; 20 December 1987 (age 38) (Note: A birth announcement (giving the 20 December 1987 date) was published in The Times in January 1988.); Wandsworth, London, England
- Other name: Country Winston
- Education: St Paul's School, London
- Occupations: Musician; songwriter; podcaster; political commentator
- Years active: 2007–present
- Spouse: Dianna Agron (m. 2016; div. 2020)
- Partner: Melissa Chen (fiancée since 2023)
- Father: Sir Paul Marshall
- Relatives: Penny Marshall (aunt); Princess Maria Gabriella of Savoy (great-aunt)
- Musical career
- Genres: Folk rock; indie rock; alternative rock; electronic
- Instruments: Banjo; guitar; bass guitar; vocals
- Formerly of: Mumford & Sons; Captain Kick and the Cowboy Ramblers

Winston Aubrey Aladar Marshall (born 20 December 1987) is an English podcaster, and musician. He is the former banjoist and lead guitarist of the folk rock band Mumford & Sons. Prior to this he was in the bluegrass sleaze rap group Captain Kick and the Cowboy Ramblers. With Mumford & Sons, Marshall won multiple awards, including two Grammys and two Brit Awards.

After leaving Mumford & Sons in 2021, Marshall has become a vocal political commentator. He hosted an interview podcast titled Marshall Matters on The Spectator from 2021 to 2023. In 2024, he launched his own politics and culture podcast, The Winston Marshall Show.

== Early life and education ==
Winston Aubrey Aladar Marshall was born in Wandsworth, London, on 20 December 1987. He has a sister Giovanna who is a singer and songwriter. His father is Paul Marshall, a British hedge fund manager who co-founded the Marshall Wace hedge fund and is the co-owner of GB News. His mother, Sabina de Balkany, is French and comes from a genteel European Jewish family.

His maternal grandmother was novelist and property developer Molly de Balkany, who was one of the first female property developers in France, and his maternal great-uncle was the collector Robert Zellinger de Balkany. Molly and Robert's family relocated to France after World War II, where they added the nobiliary particle "de" to their name despite that they had not been ennobled. Marshall has said that 13 members of his family "were murdered in [...] the Holocaust" of which his maternal grandmother was a survivor.

Marshall was educated at St Paul's School, a private school in London. He began playing guitar aged 13, and started a ZZ Top cover group called Gobbler's Knob. He was inspired to play banjo after seeing O Brother, Where Art Thou?, switching to folk music and wearing his hair in dreadlocks. Marshall did not attend university, opting instead to pursue music.

Marshall and future bandmate Marcus Mumford met as teenagers at church, playing worship music at a church group together and in a worship band, with Mumford saying Marshall is "magnetic to be around". Marshall, a multi-instrumentalist, has said that he chose to focus on banjo over guitar because there were fewer banjoists and so it was easier for him to get session jobs.

== Musical career ==
=== Early music ===
In the early 2000s, Marshall was in a bluegrass sleaze rap band called Captain Kick and the Cowboy Ramblers, who had songs such as "Jesse the Gay" and "Country London". Marshall was credited as "Country Winston Driftwood" and played the banjo, guitar, dobro, mandolin, and harmonica. With Captain Kick and the Cowboy Ramblers, Marshall ran a jam night "for teenagers who wanted to drink and play music" at Bosun's Locker, a tiny music club beneath a pasty shop on the King's Road in Fulham. The jam nights attracted a number of musicians who had an affinity for earthy acoustic music, including Noah and the Whale and Laura Marling.

=== Mumford & Sons ===
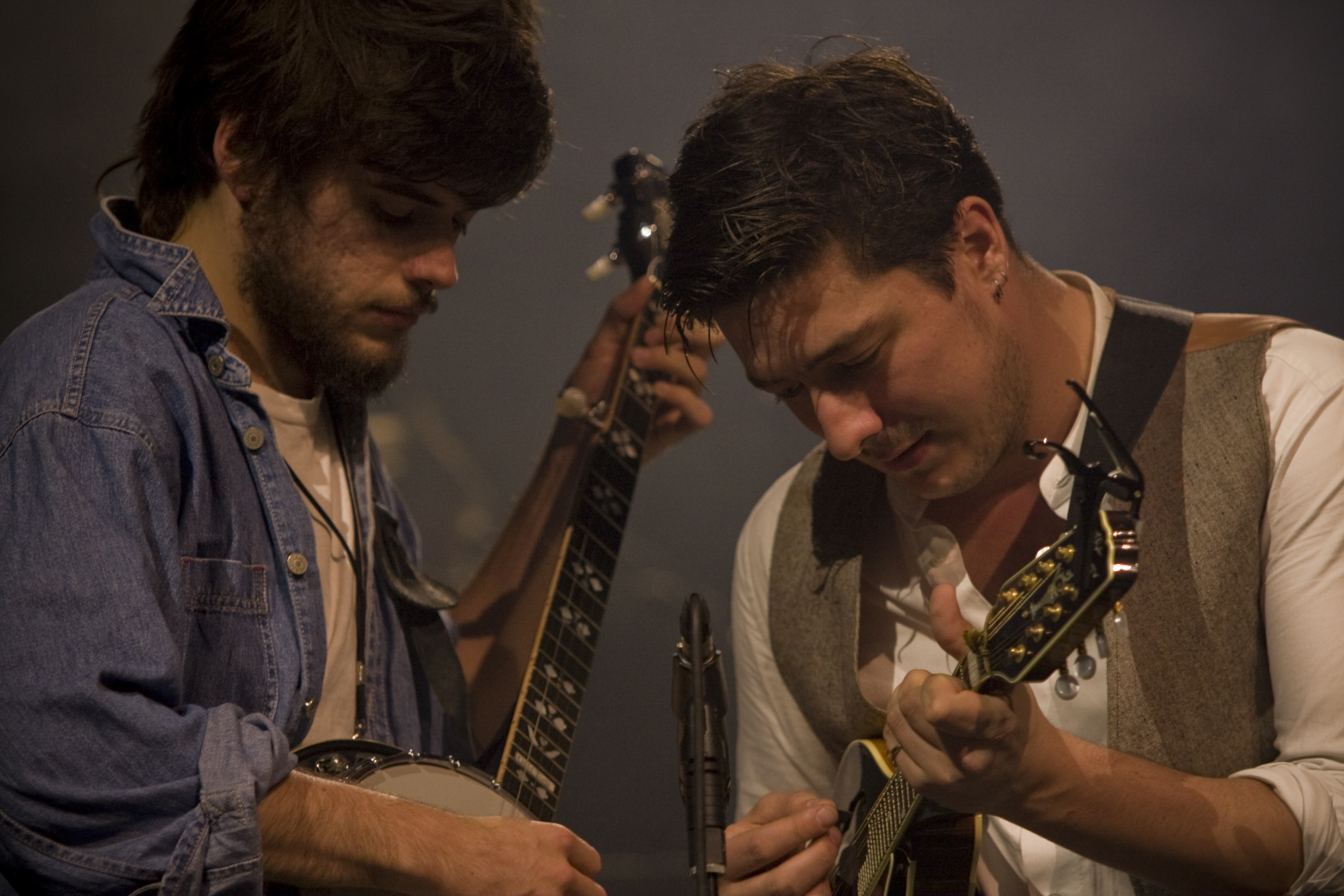
Marshall (left) and Mumford in 2010

The group Mumford & Sons came together in December 2007 after its four members had already been performing together in various configurations. Co-founder Mumford started songwriting after seeing Marshall's band Captain Kick, and other similar artists, perform while Mumford was at university in Edinburgh; Mumford was struggling at the time and found Marshall's music "a glimpse of salvation", especially as Marshall encouraged him to join them on-stage. The first Mumford & Sons performances took place in 2005 at Marshall's Bosun's Locker jam nights as informal performances of the musicians "like a hoedown". Mumford began performing here, and was joined by Marshall as well as other musician friends with whom he had previously performed, including Ben Lovett and Ted Dwane. As well as together, Dwane, Marshall, and Mumford all performed with Marling's band during the jam sessions. Mumford said that "eventually, Ted [Dwane], Ben [Lovett], and Winston [Marshall] stuck. It wasn't until [they] started writing songs together that [they] realized this was an actual band and not just a singer/songwriter with a couple of mates." Marshall played the banjo, guitars, dobro, and provided backing vocals, for the group, and was often identified as the comic relief of the line-up.

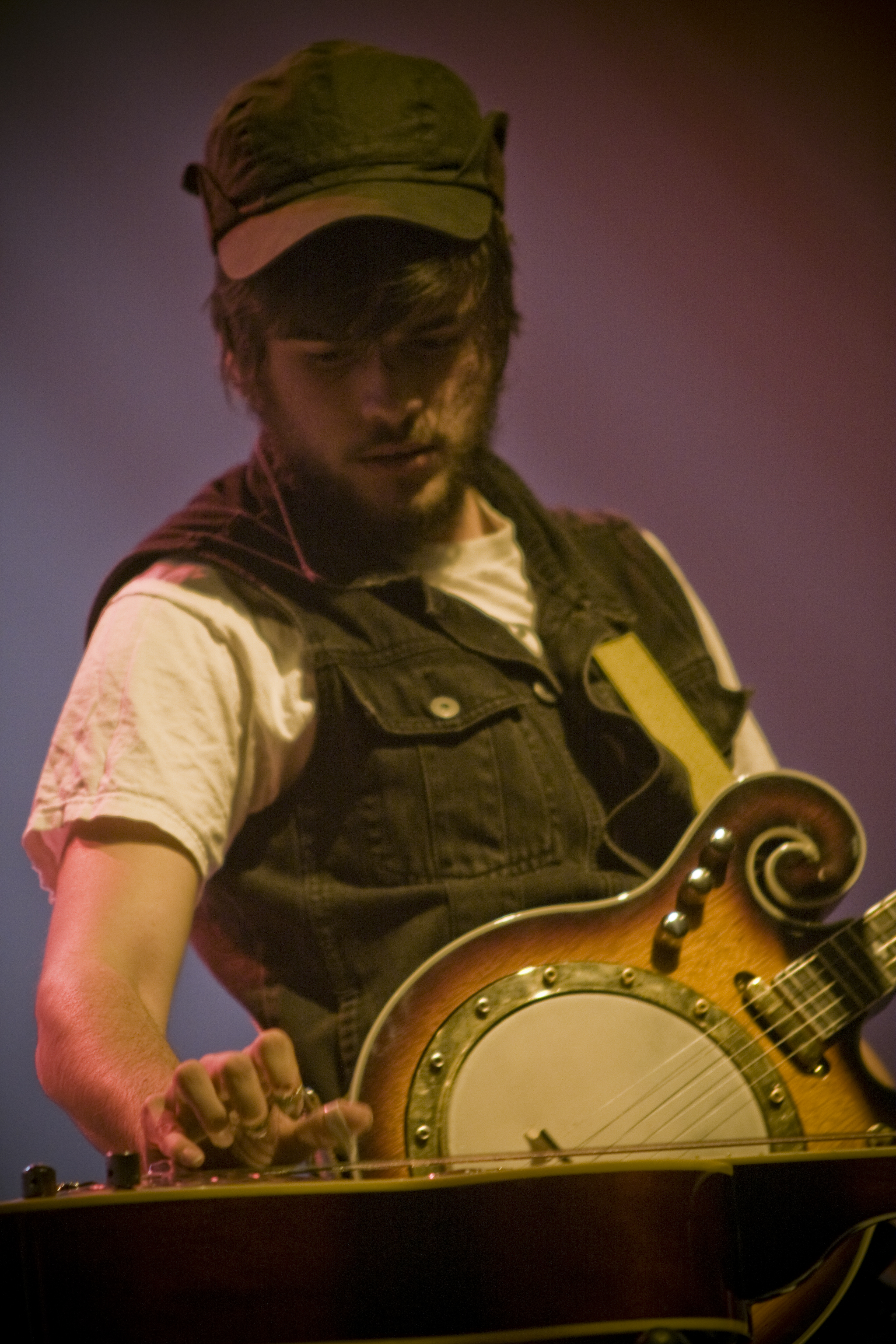
Marshall performing with Mumford & Sons in 2010

The band performed at Glastonbury Festival in 2008 and released their debut EP later the same year. Marshall and Mumford took jobs in the antique shop run by Marshall's mother in order to save money to produce and record music with Mumford & Sons. They toured with Marling and Johnny Flynn from 2008 to 2009; Marshall was nervous to perform in the United States, knowing that banjo is more common there than in the United Kingdom and their audience would know if he was good or not. In 2009, they cut their tour songs as their first album. The album, Sigh No More, on which Marshall is credited as "Country Winston", was released that year along with the single "Little Lion Man"; written by Mumford, the song was nominated at the 2011 Grammy Awards as Best Rock Song. The band was nominated for the Grammy for Best New Artist, and performed at the ceremony with Bob Dylan and the Avett Brothers. Sigh No More won the Brit Award for British Album of the Year in 2011.

The album was influenced by the music of Fleet Foxes, the Avett Brothers, Kings of Leon and Gomez; for Pitchfork, Stephen Deusner wrote that the band made this clear by pushing their musical references "with a salesman's insistence." It was released to minimal attention but steadily garnered more positive reviews, and while Deusner criticized the album as derivative, he was impressed that "there are some unexpected textures, mostly courtesy of some guy calling himself Country Winston playing banjo and dobro." The success of the bluegrass banjo-led album placed Mumford & Sons as the breakout of nu-folk music. They followed the album with near-constant touring, cementing their presence, though concert reviews were also mixed, criticizing the repetitiveness of the samey setlist while acknowledging the crowd's enjoyment. Chris Richards of The Washington Post added that the musicians' stage presence, particularly Marshall "thrusting his pelvis like a bluegrass Rick James", was irritating.

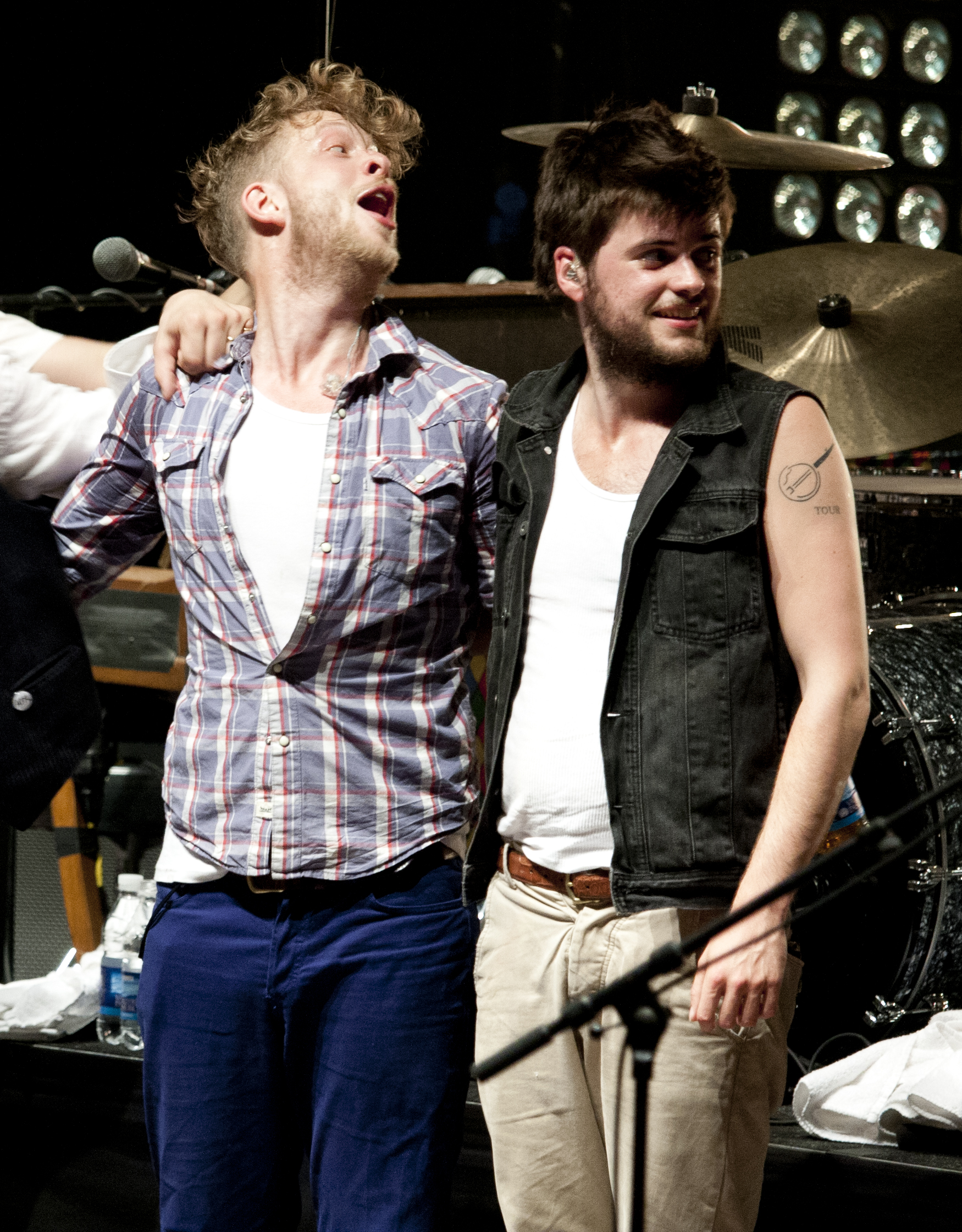
Marshall (right) and Dwane in 2012

In 2010, Mumford & Sons were the band and back-up for Marling's album I Speak Because I Can and released a joint EP with Marling and Indian group Dharohar Project. Self-titled with all three acts' names, it saw generally warm reviews that praised Marshall's dueling-banjo additions to songs. The group continued to tour extensively, and released their second album, Babel, which had a more rock sound, in 2012 to mixed reviews. Marshall provided lead vocals for the song "For Those Below". In the same year, Mumford & Sons contributed songs to two films: "The Enemy" for Wuthering Heights and "Learn Me Right" with Birdy for the soundtrack of the Pixar film Brave.

Babel became the quickest-selling album of the year, and the growing success of Mumford & Sons led to more detraction, with the band, and its banjo specifically, often criticized as inauthentic; Marshall told The Guardian that he disagreed, saying they are authentic because they play music that they enjoy and at which they are good. The band embraced other criticisms, creating a tongue-in-cheek music video for single "Hopeless Wanderer", parodying their own image. In it, Marshall was portrayed by Jason Bateman. With Babel, Marshall shed his "Country Winston" name, saying he had outgrown it (as a holdover from Captain Kick) and had become disillusioned towards country music; when he began playing the genre he associated it with bluegrass music, and then found that he did not like the country music he heard in the United States. At the same time, he expressed distaste towards the banjo and said that he does not really know how to play it and had been told by his hero Jerry Douglas to not learn, quoting Douglas saying: "The reason that it's interesting what you do is that you have no f***ing idea what you're doing!" Babel won the Grammy for Album of the Year in 2013, with the band being awarded the Brit Award for British Group the same year. They were also honored with the Ivor Novello Award for International Achievement in 2014.

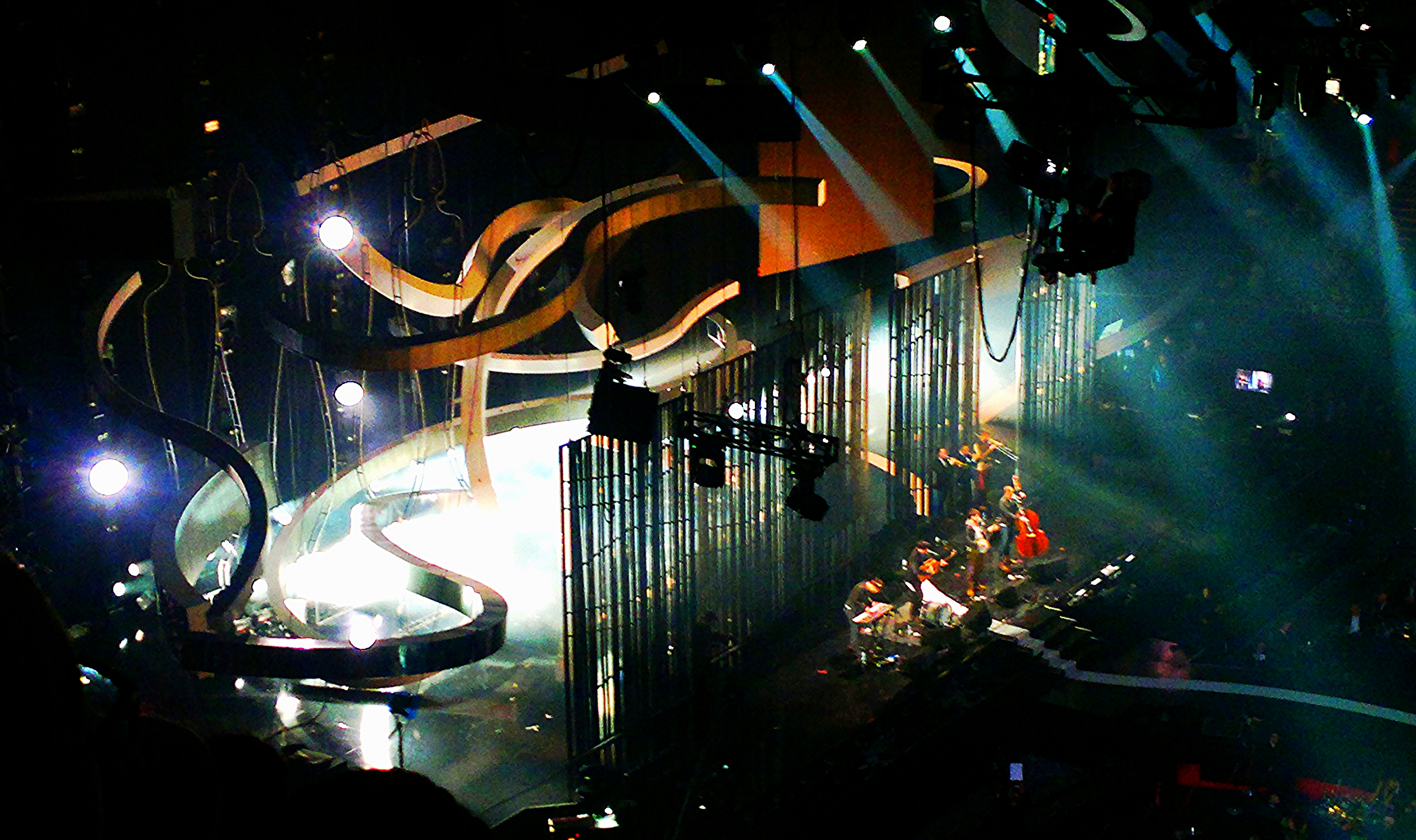
Mumford & Sons at the 2013 Brit Awards

The band went on hiatus in 2013, but contributed to a compilation album by Idris Elba released in 2014, re-recording their song "Home" with Thandiswa Mazwai. They returned in 2015 with the album Wilder Mind, on which Marshall was credited as "WN5TN". There is no banjo on Wilder Mind, an electronic rock album that was influenced by the National; Aaron Dessner was a producer. Though his bandmates disagreed, Marshall said that they changed the sound because they did not enjoy touring so much with a limited repertoire. However, he also said that he had warmed to the banjo again after time away from having to play it, and used it on the band's 2015 tour. The album received mediocre reviews, with critics in disagreement on whether losing the banjos improved the band or not; The Guardian wrote that it "was far less polarising" than their first two albums, due to being "numbingly boring" and lacking the band's USP. The next year they released an EP, Johannesburg, with African artists Baaba Maal, Beatenberg and the Very Best; they had been approached to do the project after Marshall worked with Maal on other music. The EP does not use the banjo. Marshall sang lead vocals on the song "Fool You've Landed".

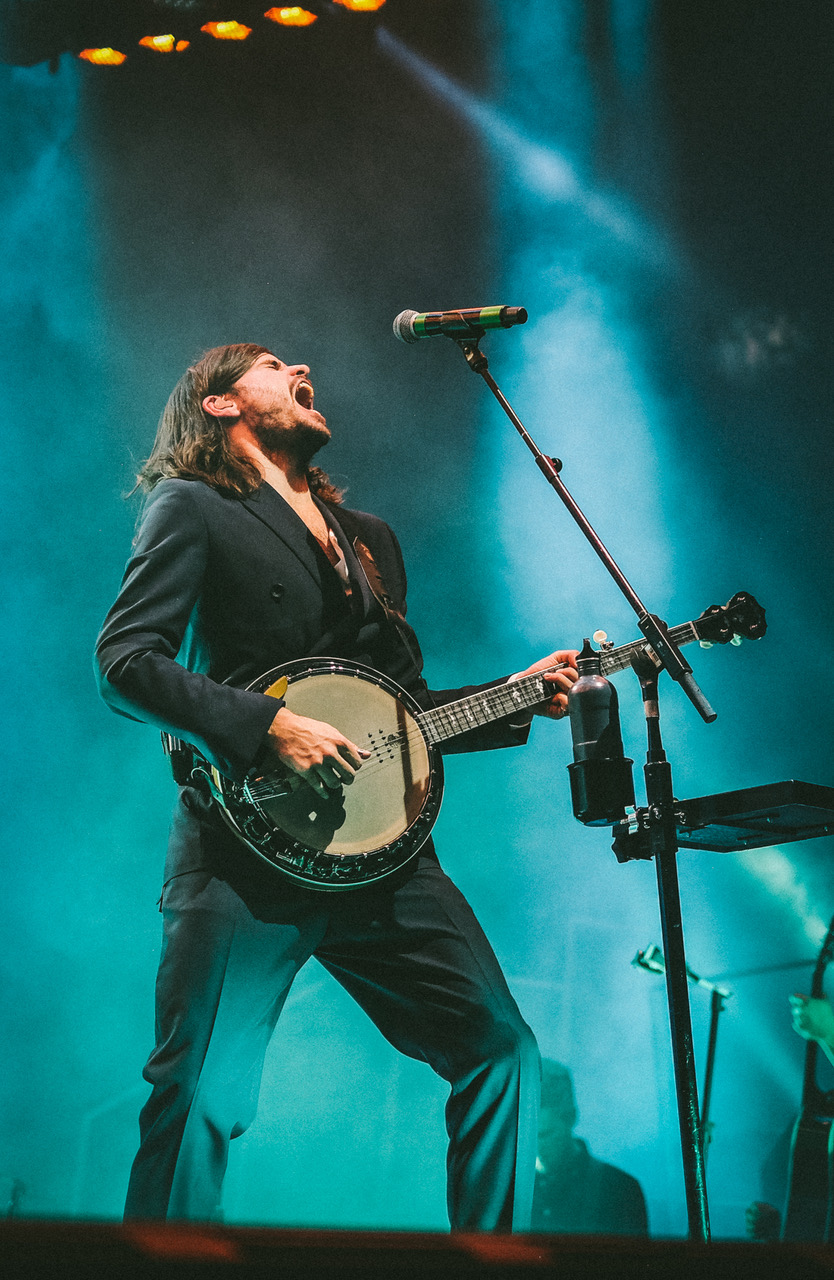
Marshall performing at Madison Square Garden in 2018

Mumford & Sons then worked on their fourth album, Delta, which was released in 2018. The album uses banjo again, but in non-folk ways. Marshall said that Delta: "does sound to me like the culmination of 10 years' work. I'm proud of it for that". The music draws more on their adult life experiences than their previous work, with the Evening Standard noting that during its creation Marshall got married but also experienced depression. Marshall said that since the album was not their first and would not be their last, they felt freedom to branch out in sound. He started writing some of the songs on Delta in Nashville, where Agron was filming a movie and they became engaged. Lovett said Marshall "was throwing these pretty left-field sounds out of these writing sessions in Nashville"; Marshall was encouraged by sound engineer Garrett Miller to try more synthesized music, resulting in "Picture You", and composed the first verse and the falsetto hook of "Woman" there. He also wrote "Wild Heart", which was recorded so quickly he did not actually perform on the track on the album. Spin noted the three songs were the more powerful of the album's stripped-back songs.

Marshall took the early components of "Woman" to his bandmates in Brooklyn, and Lovett said of the moment: "[it] just felt like something that was very, very different, but also felt really good. Maybe that was a moment that we felt unshackled by anything that we had done previously." Marshall said that despite the song title, "Woman" is about the love shared by the couple. It is an R&B indie song, with Mumford saying they were influenced by Jai Paul; Marshall used a five-string cello banjo on it, disguising the banjo sound, with three banjo tracks layered. Rolling Stone felt that "Picture You" and "Woman" sounded like Khalid songs; The Observer compared them to Coldplay songs. The album received sub-par reviews.

With Mumford & Sons, Marshall won multiple awards, including two Grammys and two Brit Awards.

In March 2021, Marshall faced criticism for lauding Unmasked: Inside Antifa's Radical Plan to Destroy Democracy, a book written by conservative American journalist and social media personality Andy Ngo. Later that month, Marshall apologised for praising the book and stated that he would be taking a break from the band "to examine [his] blindspots"; in June 2021, he wrote an essay defending his support for Ngo, discussing the reaction to his apology for the tweet, and announcing that he would be permanently leaving Mumford & Sons so that he could exercise free speech about politics without involving his former bandmates. In a 2022 interview with The Sunday Times Magazine, he said that what made it hard to leave the band was that he had thought they would still be playing together in their sixties.

=== Individual music and other ventures ===
In 2010, Marshall was involved with a supergroup called Mt. Desolation, recording music and performing shows with Ronnie Vannucci Jr. of The Killers, Tom Hobden of Noah and the Whale, and Jesse Quin and Tim Rice-Oxley of Keane. They released a free download single, "State of Affairs", as well as the self-titled album Mt. Desolation. In 2012, Marshall played the banjo for the Dropkick Murphys song "Rose Tattoo"; the band joked that they "kidnapped" him after playing the same festival, adding that his banjo part is "subtle, but with that rolling finger-picking style, you know it's him when you hear it". Marshall then joined a different, temporary, supergroup called Salvador Dalí Parton in October 2013, with fellow musicians Gill Landry of Old Crow Medicine Show; Mike Harris of Apache Relay; Jake Orrall of JEFF the Brotherhood; and Justin Hayward-Young of the Vaccines. The band, intended as a joke from the start, wrote six songs in 20 minutes on their first day together, held a rehearsal the next day, and performed six shows around Nashville, Tennessee, that night before breaking up.

He has also pursued comedy, taking improv classes at the Upright Citizens Brigade (UCB) prior to 2013, and planning a comedy web series in 2015. He said that he wanted to take the concept of UCB to England, because they "don't have anything like it", and was invited to perform a monologue there; Vulture wrote that the monologue, about "condoms and being Jewish", "didn't go well." When asked if he is Jewish, Marshall laughingly replied "ish".

In 2015, Marshall became interested in techno music and electronic dance music after he attended every night of a James Ford residency at London club XOYO. Ford had been working with Mumford & Sons on their album Wilder Mind through his group, Simian Mobile Disco, and, inspired, Marshall began working on an individual electronic side-project that went nowhere. In 2017, he collaborated with electronic duo HVOB. Marshall approached HVOB by sending an email that they initially thought was fake. When they began working together, Marshall sent samples to HVOB, who are based in Vienna. Together they released the single "The Blame Game", on which Marshall contributes vocals, and the album Silk. They had only planned to release an EP, but quickly chose to extend this to a full album despite needing to meet the same deadline. The album is darker than HVOB's other music, with the duo saying that Marshall took their sound and styled it for a concert rather than club. Marshall and HVOB toured Europe in April 2017 on the fifteen-city Silk Tour. The single and album were positively reviewed.

Marshall collaborated individually with Baaba Maal between 2013 and 2015, at the 2013 and 2014 editions of the Blues du Fleuve festival and playing banjo on Maal's 2015 album The Traveller. He experimented with more music in 2019 when he remixed the Maggie Rogers song "Light On" and Kevin Garrett song "Don't Rush".

In November 2022, Marshall undertook a solo US tour, performing in San Francisco, New York and Arizona at events organised by the Foundation Against Intolerance and Racism. In December 2022, he featured on Ariel Pink's novelty Christmas single "Rudolph's Laptop", co-written with Alex Trimble of Two Door Cinema Club. In April 2025, Marshall performed with Oliver Anthony at the inaugural Rural Revival Project in Spruce Pine, North Carolina, a benefit concert for communities affected by Hurricane Helene.

== Political activism ==
=== Podcasting ===
In December 2021, Marshall launched the Marshall Matters podcast, hosted by British politically conservative magazine The Spectator, for which Marshall became a contributor in the same year. His father, Paul Marshall, acquired the magazine in 2024. The podcast was promoted as Marshall interviewing people working in creative industries "to find out what indeed is the state of the arts." By October 2023, 45 episodes had been published, including interviews with David Baddiel, Jordan Peterson and Don McLean.Marshall Matters on The Spectator from 2021 to 2023.

In January 2024, Marshall launched The Winston Marshall Show, an independent podcast covering right-wing talking points. Its guests have included Nigel Farage, US congressman Thomas Massie, and US senator Eric Schmitt.

=== Other activities ===
Marshall is interested in the philosophy of Canadian psychologist Jordan Peterson, and invited Peterson to Mumford & Sons' studio in 2018, after which Peterson sharing a photograph of him with the group. When asked about his involvement with Peterson, who has been a controversial figure, Marshall told CBC Radio: "I don't think [Peterson's] psychology is controversial, but the quasi-political stuff... I think it's a conversation we're having a little bit as a band and, do we want to get into the political stuff?" Later in 2018, Marshall told NME that he "[thinks] everyone should read widely. If you read something, work out who's got the opposite opinion and read that guy so you can form your own ideas." In the same interview, both Marshall and Mumford opined that musicians should not talk about politics, and said that they did not like being asked about politics, with Marshall telling the magazine:

I have a little bit of frustration with the politicising of music. I don't mind when artists are political, but I think politics is fucking complicated. It's different from three years ago when we were doing promo for Wilder Mind – we weren't ever asked about politics. People didn't care, but now everyone's got a fucking opinion. Everything is, "Politics this, politics that". It's a massive change.

In January 2021, Marshall co-founded Hong Kong Link Up, a non-profit organisation pairing Hong Kongers arriving in the UK with local residents to help them settle, following the implementation of the Hong Kong national security law.

On 7 July 2022 he was a guest on the BBC's political programme Question Time, discussing the resignation of British Prime Minister Boris Johnson, which had been announced that day.

In April 2024, Marshall spoke at the Oxford Union against the motion "This House Believes Populism is a Threat to Democracy", opposite former US House Speaker Nancy Pelosi.

In April 2025, he attended a White House press briefing, where he asked Press Secretary Karoline Leavitt whether the Trump administration would consider granting political asylum to British citizens facing prosecution over speech offences. Leavitt said she had not heard the idea proposed to the president but would raise it with the national security team. In June 2025, Marshall reported from Israel during the Twelve-Day War for The Winston Marshall Show and GB News.

In April 2026, Marshall suggested on American TV channel Fox News that floating walls armed with explosive mines could be used to prevent migrants, all of them according to him being economic migrants and not refugees, from crossing the English Channel to reach the UK.

== Musical influence ==
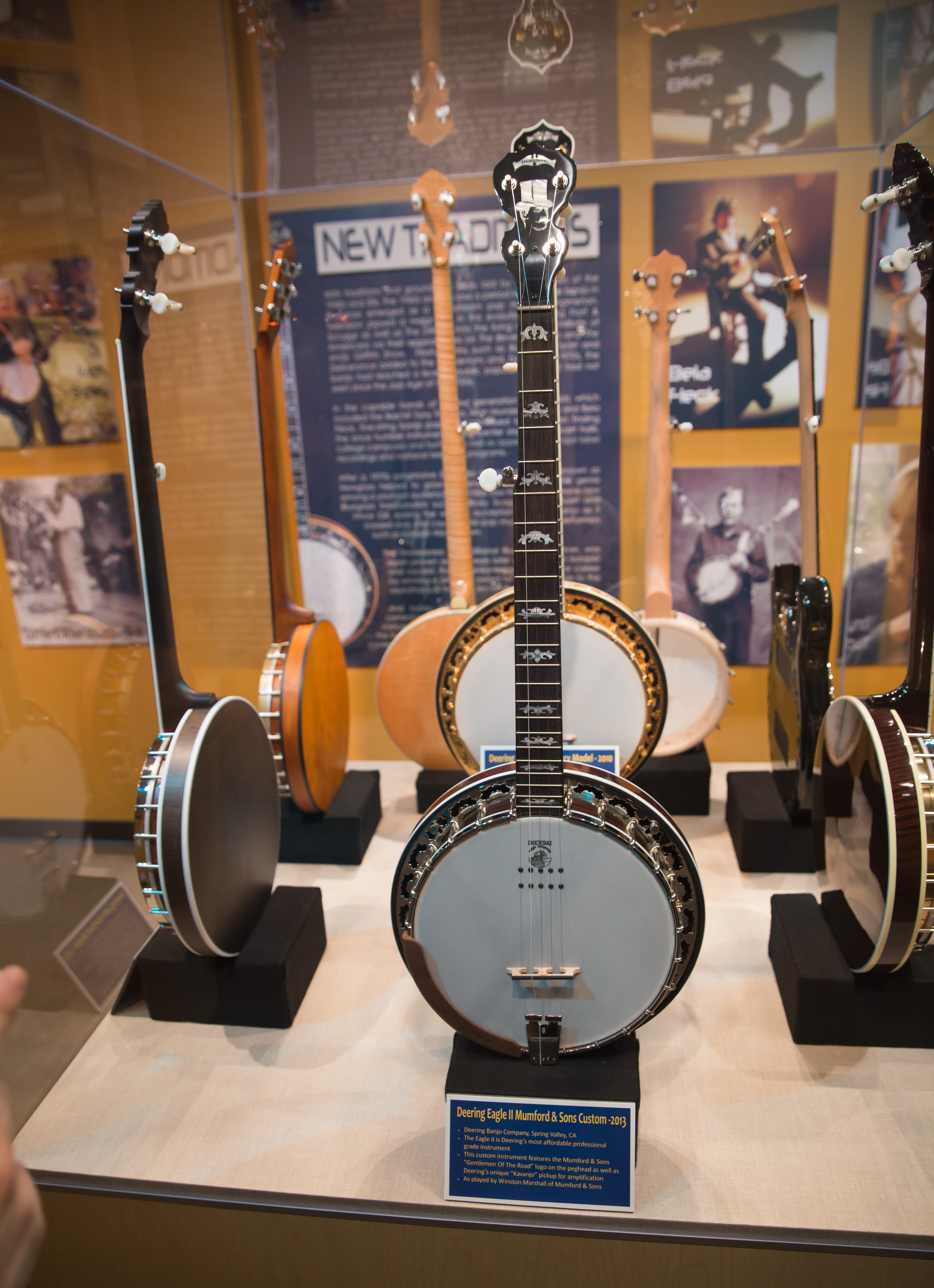
Marshall's banjos on display at the American Banjo Museum

The existence of the British nu-folk scene has been credited to Marshall, as its most successful acts – Marling, Flynn, Hayward-Young, Noah and the Whale, Alan Pownall, King Charles, Alessi's Ark, Peggy Sue – all "graduated" from performing at Bosun's Locker on the folk jam nights that he ran, reportedly starting them as a way to play banjo. One musician who played there said: "I don't think you could pin the craze on anyone else."

Marshall's banjo playing in Mumford & Sons increased the credibility and popularity of the instrument. Emmylou Harris said that the band made banjo respectable, and their music is deemed responsible for a banjo revival both in Europe and the United States. The band's identity is said to be synonymous with the banjo, and Marshall has a Deering banjo named after him, the Winston Marshall Signature Model.

== Personal life ==
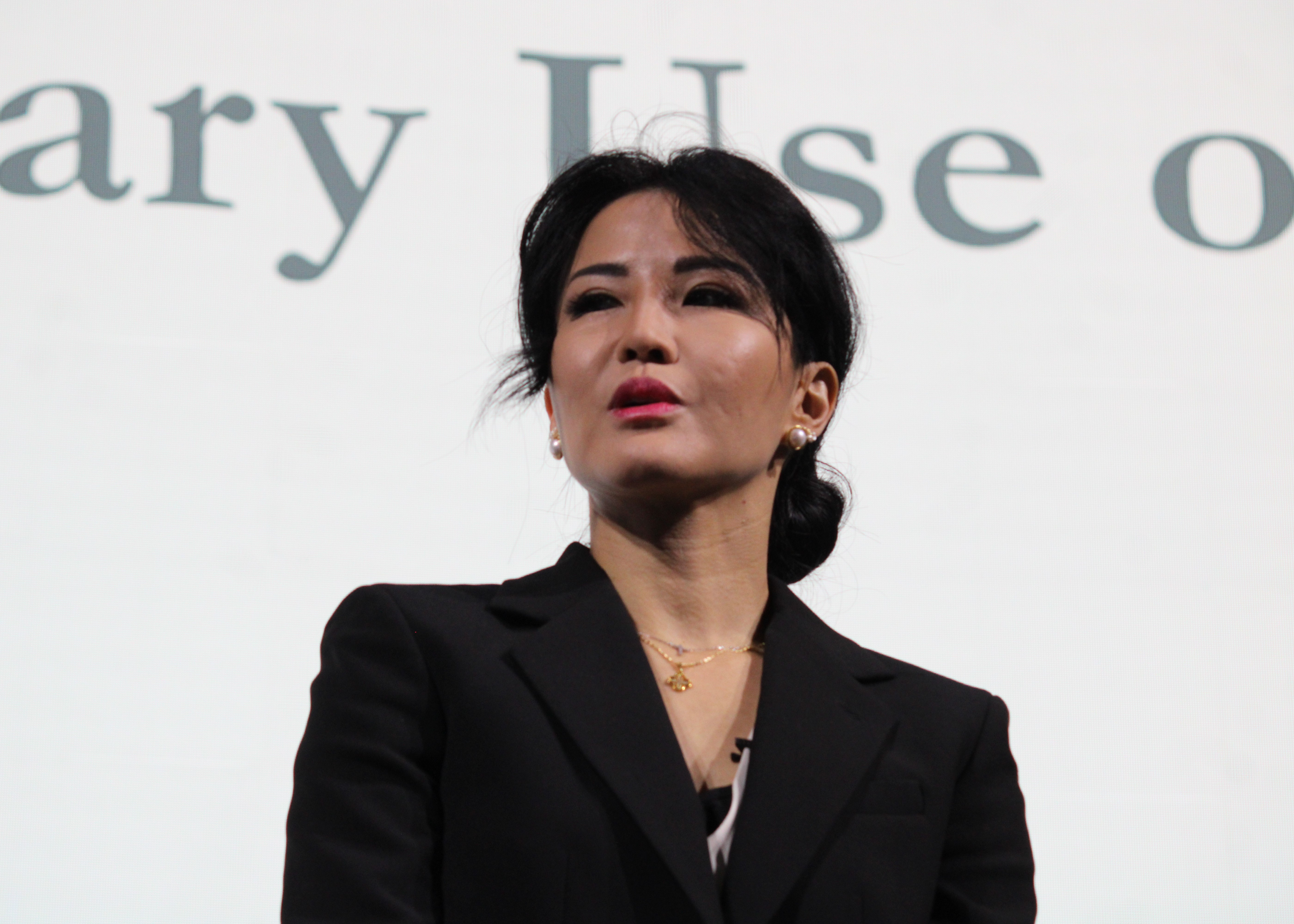
Political commentator Melissa Chen, Marshall's fiancée, in 2025

Marshall dated Irish stylist Susan Cooney, who dressed Mumford & Sons and Haim, and in March 2012 attended the White House British State dinner with her. It was first reported that Marshall was dating American actress Dianna Agron in July 2015, and the couple got engaged in late 2015. They were married on 15 October 2016 in Morocco, and kept their relationship private. They separated in 2019 and divorced in 2020.

In 2022, Marshall said that after several album tours, the lifestyle had negatively affected him, leading him to start self-medicating with alcohol and to regularly take a mix of hard drugs, describing the time as "all a bit of a blur"; he got sober in 2019, saying this gave him clarity and energy. He then had a "painful separation" from Agron and, when they divorced, returned to his Christian faith.

In 2023, Marshall became engaged to the political commentator Melissa Chen, contributing editor at The Spectator US.

He was described as enthusiastic about fashion in 2010, when he compared his style to that of the Brideshead Revisited character Sebastian Flyte. He later expressed regret that he had worn that style for photoshoots, rather than clothes of his personal style. He became more interested in style and grooming in 2012 after GQ named him the sixth-worst-dressed man in the world.

In 2018 he was introduced to dance by Agron, and took classes at Kristen Sudeikis' Forward Space dance studio. Other Forward Space dancers are featured in the music video for "Woman".

He is an avid supporter of Manchester United.

== Selected discography ==
=== With Mumford & Sons ===
List of studio albums
Title	Details
Sigh No More	Released: 2 October 2009; Label: Island; Formats: CD, LP, digital download
Babel	Released: 21 September 2012; Label: Island; Formats: CD, LP, digital download
Wilder Mind	Released: 4 May 2015; Label: Island; Formats: CD, LP, digital download
Delta	Released: 16 November 2018; Label: Island; Formats: CD, LP, digital download

List of singles
Title	Year	Album
"Little Lion Man"	2009	Sigh No More
"Winter Winds"	2009	Sigh No More
"The Cave" (Note: "The Cave" was originally released 11 months earlier, six months before "Little Lion Man" and Sigh No More were released. It was a limited edition single with a B-side different from the 2010 single release.)	2010	Sigh No More
"Roll Away Your Stone"	2010	Sigh No More
"I Will Wait"	2012	Babel
"Lover of the Light"	2012	Babel
"Whispers in the Dark"	2013	Babel
"Babel"	2013	Babel
"Hopeless Wanderer"	2013	Babel
"Believe"	2015	Wilder Mind
"The Wolf"	2015	Wilder Mind
"Ditmas"	2015	Wilder Mind
"Tompkins Square Park"	2015	Wilder Mind
"Just Smoke"	2016	Wilder Mind
"There Will Be Time" (with Baaba Maal)	2016	Johannesburg
"Guiding Light"	2018	Delta
"Beloved"	2019	Delta
"Woman"	2019	Delta
"Blind Leading the Blind"	2019	Non-album singles
"Forever (Garage Version)"	2020	Non-album singles

=== Individual ===
List of studio albums
Title	Details
Mt. Desolation	Artist: Mt. Desolation; Released: 18 October 2010; Label: Island, Cherrytree, Coop; Formats: CD
The Traveller	Artist: Baaba Maal; Released: 2015
Day of the Dead	Artist: The National; Released: 20 May 2016; Label: 4AD; Formats: CD, LP, digital download
Silk	Artist: HVOB and Winston Marshall; Released: 24 March 2017

List of singles
Title	Year	Artist	Album
"State of Affairs"	2010	Mt. Desolation	Mt. Desolation
"Rose Tattoo"	2012	Dropkick Murphys	Rose Tattoo: For Boston Charity
"The Traveller"	2015	Baaba Maal	The Traveller
"The Blame Game"	2017	HVOB and Winston Marshall	Silk
"Light On (Winston Marshall Remix)"	2019	Maggie Rogers	Heard It in a Past Life
"Don't Rush (Winston Marshall Remix)"	2019	Kevin Garrett	Hoax
