= Delta Tour =

2018–20 concert tour by Mumford & Sons

- Tour by Mumford & Sons
- Associated album: Delta
- Start date: 16 November 2018
- End date: 8 March 2020
- Legs: 10
- No. of shows: 35 in Europe; 48 in North America; 8 in Oceania; 7 in Asia; 98 total

Mumford & Sons concert chronology
- Wilder Mind Tour (2015-18); Delta Tour (2018-20); Summer Tour '23 (2023)

Delta Tour was the fourth headlining concert tour by British band Mumford & Sons, in support of the album of the same name (2018). It began on 16 November 2018 in Dublin, Ireland and the last show before the COVID-19 pandemic was held on 8 March 2020 at Okeechobee Music & Arts Festival.

== Critical reception ==
Ed Power of The Telegraph rated the show in Dublin four out of five stars and called it as "a valiant and warm-hearted attempt to connect with their crowd". Reviewing the show in London, Laura Abernethy of Metro rated the show three out of five stars and praised the "ambitious" staging but criticized the set list, noting it "a bit disconnected".

A.D. Amorosi of Variety reviewed the show in Philadelphia and called it "epic" and "earthen". Jeffrey B. Remz of Country Standard Time called the show in Boston as it "was far more up to snuff, albeit not perfect". Jim Shahen Jr. of Times Union highlighted the performance of "I Will Wait", noting it "sent the folks home happy". Jordan Zivitz of Montreal Gazette noted the band's intention on "preserving the intimacy of early shows" and noted that "the vote of confidence in their present was just as crucial as celebrations of their past." Chris Racic of CleveRock praised the stage-in-the-round, noted that it successfully provided "a feeling of intimacy". Reviewing the show in Lexington, Carly Necessary of The Cardinal Spirit noted that their "energetic and lively aura was easily recognizable" and described it an "exhilarating" concert.

== Set list ==
This set list is from the concert on 9 March 2019 in Cleveland, United States. It is not intended to represent all tour dates.

1. "42"
2. "Guiding Light"
3. "Little Lion Man"
4. "Babel"
5. "Lover of the Light"
6. "Tompkins Square Park"
7. "Woman"
8. "Holland Road"
9. "Beloved"
10. "The Cave"
11. "Ditmas"
12. "Believe"
13. "Picture You"
14. "Darkness Visible"
15. "The Wolf"

Encore

16. "Timshel"
17. "Hurt" (Nine Inch Nails cover)
18. "I Will Wait"
19. "Delta"

== Tour dates ==
List of concerts, showing date, city, country, venue, opening acts, tickets sold, number of available tickets and amount of gross revenue
Date	City	Country	Venue	Opening acts	Attendance	Revenue
Europe
16 November 2018	Dublin	Ireland	3Arena	Maggie Rogers	—N/a	—N/a
18 November 2018	Belfast	Northern Ireland	SSE Arena	Maggie Rogers	—N/a	—N/a
20 November 2018	Glasgow	Scotland	The SSE Hydro	Maggie Rogers	—N/a	—N/a
23 November 2018	Birmingham	England	Genting Arena	Maggie Rogers	—N/a	—N/a
25 November 2018	Newcastle	England	Metro Radio Arena	Maggie Rogers	—N/a	—N/a
27 November 2018	Nottingham	England	Motorpoint Arena	Maggie Rogers	—N/a	—N/a
29 November 2018	London	England	The O_{2} Arena	Maggie Rogers	18,289 / 19,723	$1,265,440
1 December 2018	Leeds	England	First Direct Arena	Maggie Rogers	—N/a	—N/a
North America
7 December 2018	Philadelphia	United States	Wells Fargo Center	Maggie Rogers	—N/a	—N/a
9 December 2018	Boston	United States	TD Garden	Maggie Rogers	—N/a	—N/a
10 December 2018	New York City	United States	Madison Square Garden	Maggie Rogers	36,936 / 36,936	$2,549,192
11 December 2018	New York City	United States	Madison Square Garden	Maggie Rogers	36,936 / 36,936	$2,549,192
14 December 2018	Washington, D.C.	United States	Capital One Arena	Maggie Rogers	—N/a	—N/a
17 December 2018	Toronto	Canada	Scotiabank Arena	Maggie Rogers	—N/a	—N/a
18 December 2018	Toronto	Canada	Scotiabank Arena	Maggie Rogers	—N/a	—N/a
Oceania
12 January 2019 (Note: The concerts are part of Gentlemen of the Road.)	Auckland	New Zealand	The Outer Fields at Western Springs	Leon Bridges; Michael Kiwanuka; Angie McMahon	—N/a	—N/a
15 January 2019	Brisbane	Australia	Brisbane Entertainment Centre	Michael Kiwanuka; Gretta Ray	8,673 / 9,526	$702,861
18 January 2019	Sydney	Australia	Qudos Bank Arena	Michael Kiwanuka; Gretta Ray	—N/a	—N/a
19 January 2019	Sydney	Australia	Enmore Theatre	Gretta Ray	—N/a	—N/a
22 January 2019	Melbourne	Australia	Sidney Myer Music Bowl	Michael Kiwanuka; Gretta Ray	—N/a	—N/a
23 January 2019	Melbourne	Australia	Sidney Myer Music Bowl	Michael Kiwanuka; Gretta Ray	—N/a	—N/a
24 January 2019	Adelaide	Australia	Adelaide Entertainment Centre	Michael Kiwanuka; Gretta Ray	—N/a	—N/a
27 January 2019	Perth	Australia	RAC Arena	Michael Kiwanuka; Gretta Ray	8,974 / 10,006	$749,358
North America
27 February 2019	Providence	United States	Dunkin' Donuts Center	Cat Power	—N/a	—N/a
28 February 2019	Hartford	United States	XL Center	Cat Power	—N/a	—N/a
2 March 2019	Albany	United States	Times Union Center	Cat Power	14,704 / 14,704	$1,049,780
4 March 2019	Montreal	Canada	Bell Centre	Cat Power	15,862 / 19,000	$1,097,990
5 March 2019	Ottawa	Canada	Richcraft Live at the Canadian Tire Centre	Cat Power	—N/a	—N/a
8 March 2019	Buffalo	United States	KeyBank Center	Cat Power	—N/a	—N/a
9 March 2019	Cleveland	United States	Quicken Loans Arena	Cat Power	—N/a	—N/a
11 March 2019	Columbus	United States	Nationwide Arena	Cat Power	—N/a	—N/a
12 March 2019	Lexington	United States	Rupp Arena	Cat Power	—N/a	—N/a
14 March 2019	Pittsburgh	United States	PPG Paints Arena	Cat Power	—N/a	—N/a
16 March 2019	Charlottesville	United States	John Paul Jones Arena	Cat Power	—N/a	—N/a
17 March 2019	Raleigh	United States	PNC Arena	Cat Power	—N/a	—N/a
18 March 2019	Charleston	United States	North Charleston Coliseum	Cat Power	—N/a	—N/a
20 March 2019	Atlanta	United States	State Farm Arena	Cat Power	14,826 / 14,826	$1,084,620
22 March 2019	Nashville	United States	Bridgestone Arena	Cat Power	—N/a	—N/a
23 March 2019	Birmingham	United States	BJCC Arena	Cat Power	—N/a	—N/a
25 March 2019	Indianapolis	United States	Bankers Life Fieldhouse	Cat Power	—N/a	—N/a
27 March 2019	Detroit	United States	Little Caesars Arena	Cat Power	—N/a	—N/a
29 March 2019	Chicago	United States	United Center	Cat Power	19,495 / 19,495	$1,463,505
30 March 2019	Madison	United States	Kohl Center	Cat Power	—N/a	—N/a
31 March 2019	Milwaukee	United States	Fiserv Forum	Cat Power	—N/a	—N/a
Europe
25 April 2019	Lisbon	Portugal	Altice Arena	Gang of Youths	—	—
27 April 2019	Barcelona	Spain	Palau Sant Jordi	Gang of Youths	—	—
29 April 2019	Milan	Italy	Mediolanum Forum	Gang of Youths	—	—
1 May 2019	Munich	Germany	Olympiahalle	Gang of Youths	14,376 / 14,450	$923,851
3 May 2019	Vienna	Austria	Wiener Stadthalle	Gang of Youths	—	—
5 May 2019	Basel	Switzerland	St. Jakobshalle	Gang of Youths	—	—
7 May 2019	Paris	France	Zénith	Gang of Youths	—	—
8 May 2019	Esch-sur-Alzette	Luxembourg	Rockhal	Gang of Youths	—	—
9 May 2019	Amsterdam	Netherlands	Ziggo Dome	Gang of Youths	—	—
11 May 2019	Berlin	Germany	Mercedes-Benz Arena	Gang of Youths	15,374 / 15,530	$1,036,050
13 May 2019	Frankfurt	Germany	Festhalle	Gang of Youths	9,859 / 11,393	$634,805
15 May 2019	Cologne	Germany	Lanxess Arena	Gang of Youths	17,093 / 18,677	$1,088,160
17 May 2019	Copenhagen	Denmark	Royal Arena	Gang of Youths	—	—
18 May 2019	Gothenburg	Sweden	Scandinavium	Gang of Youths	—	—
19 May 2019	Oslo	Norway	Oslo Spektrum	Gang of Youths	—	—
21 May 2019	Stockholm	Sweden	Ericsson Globe	Gang of Youths	—	—
North America
26 May 2019 (Note: The concert on 26 May 2019 at Napa Valley Expo in Napa Valley, United States is part of BottleRock Napa Valley.)	Napa	United States	Napa Valley Expo	—N/a	—N/a	—N/a
Europe
1 June 2019 (Note: The concert on 1 June 2019 at Victoria Park in London is part of All Points East.)	London	England	Victoria Park	(Note: The opening acts will feature Leon Bridges, Dizzee Rascal, The Vaccines, Dermot Kennedy, Villagers, The Staves, Jade Bird, Marika Hackman, Tamino, Maisie Peters, Gretta Ray, Dizzy, Alan Power, Delilah Montagu and HYYTS.)	—N/a	—N/a
2 June 2019 (Note: The concert on 2 June 2019 at Echo Arena in Liverpool is originally scheduled to take place on 2 December 2018, but later rescheduled due to logistical reasons.)	Liverpool	England	M&S Bank Arena	Villagers	—	—
4 June 2019 (Note: The concert on 4 June 2019 at FlyDSA Arena in Sheffield is originally scheduled to take place on 24 November 2018, but later rescheduled due to logistical reasons.)	Sheffield	England	FlyDSA Arena	Villagers	—	—
6 June 2019 (Note: The concert on 6 June 2019 at Manchester Arena in Manchester is originally scheduled to take place on 21 November 2018, but later rescheduled due to logistical reasons.)	Manchester	England	Manchester Arena	Villagers	17,568 / 18,106	$1,145,870
8 June 2019 (Note: The concert on 8 June 2019 at Megaland in Landgraaf, Netherlands is part of Pinkpop Festival.)	Landgraaf	Netherlands	Megaland	—N/a	—N/a	—N/a
10 June 2019 (Note: The concert on 10 June 2019 at Motorpoint Arena in Cardiff is originally scheduled to take place on 28 November 2018, but later rescheduled due to logistical reasons.)	Cardiff	Wales	Motorpoint Arena	Villagers	—	—
14 June 2019	Malahide	Ireland	Malahide Castle	Dermot Kennedy; Wild Youth; Aurora	—	—
15 June 2019	Malahide	Ireland	Malahide Castle	Dermot Kennedy; Wild Youth; Aurora	—	—
22 June 2019 (Note: The concert on 22 June 2019 at Eichenring in Scheeßel is part of Hurricane Festival.)	Scheeßel	Germany	Eichenring	—N/a	—N/a	—N/a
23 June 2019 (Note: The concert on 23 June 2019 at take-off GewerbePark in Neuhausen ob Eck is part of Southside Festival.)	Neuhausen ob Eck	Germany	take-off GewerbePark	—N/a	—N/a	—N/a
29 June 2019 (Note: The concert on 29 June 2019 at Festivalpark in Werchter is part of Rock Werchter.)	Werchter	Belgium	Festivalpark	—N/a	—N/a	—N/a
North America
3 August 2019	Los Angeles	United States	Banc of California Stadium	Portugal. The Man	—	—
5 August 2019	Portland	United States	Moda Center	Portugal. The Man	—	—
7 August 2019	Vancouver	Canada	BC Place	Portugal. The Man	—	—
9 August 2019	George	United States	The Gorge Amphitheatre	Portugal. The Man	—	—
11 August 2019	Missoula	United States	Ogren Park at Allegiance Field	Portugal. The Man	—	—
13 August 2019	West Valley City	United States	USANA Amphitheatre	Portugal. The Man	—	—
15 August 2019	Greenwood Village	United States	Fiddler's Green Amphitheatre	Lord Huron	47,756 / 79,094	$2,635,504
16 August 2019	Greenwood Village	United States	Fiddler's Green Amphitheatre	Tennis	47,756 / 79,094	$2,635,504
17 August 2019	Greenwood Village	United States	Fiddler's Green Amphitheatre	The Milk Carton Kids	47,756 / 79,094	$2,635,504
15 September 2019 (Note: The concert on 15 September 2019 at Del Mar Racetrack in San Diego is part of Kaaboo del Mar.)	San Diego	United States	Del Mar Racetrack	—N/a	—N/a	—N/a
16 September 2019	Phoenix	United States	Talking Stick Resort Arena	The Sun Never Sets On The Cool Kids	—	—
19 September 2019	San Francisco	United States	Chase Center	Gang of Youths	—	
24 September 2019	Guadalajara	Mexico	Auditorio Telmex	Gang of Youths	—	—
25 September 2019	Mexico City	Mexico	Pepsi Center WTC	Gang of Youths	—	—
28 September 2019	Monterrey	Mexico	Showcenter	Gang of Youths	—	—
6 October 2019 (Note: The concerts on 6 and 13 October 2019 at Zilker Park in Austin are part of Austin City Limits Music Festival.)	Austin	United States	Zilker Park	—N/a	—N/a	—N/a
8 October 2019	Houston	United States	Toyota Center	Gang of Youths	—	—
9 October 2019	Dallas	United States	American Airlines Center	Gang of Youths	—	—
11 October 2019	Oklahoma City	United States	Chesapeake Energy Arena	Gang of Youths	—	—
13 October 2019	Austin	United States	Zilker Park	—N/a	—N/a	—N/a
Asia
12 November 2019	Osaka	Japan	Namba Hatch	—N/a	—	—
13 November 2019	Tokyo	Japan	Toyosu Pit	—N/a	—	—
15 November 2019	Seoul	South Korea	MUV Hall	—N/a	—	—
17 November 2019	Taipei	Taiwan	Legacy Taipei	—N/a	—	—
21 November 2019	Bangkok	Thailand	GMM Live House	—N/a	—	—
23 November 2019 (Note: The concert on 23 November 2019 at Fort Canning Park in Singapore is part of Neon Lights Festival.)	Singapore		Fort Canning Park	—N/a	—N/a	—N/a
24 November 2019 (Note: The concert on 24 November 2019 at Cyberport in Hong Kong is part of Clockenflap.)	Hong Kong		Cyberport	—N/a	—N/a	—N/a
U.S. Holiday Radio Festivals
5 December 2019	Brooklyn	United States	Barclays Center	—N/a	—	—
7 December 2019	San Jose	United States	SAP Center	—N/a	—	—
8 December 2019	Anaheim	United States	Honda Center	—N/a	—	—
10 December 2019	New York City	United States	Beacon Theatre	—N/a	—	—
12 December 2019	Washington, D.C.	United States	The Anthem	—N/a	—	—
14 December 2019	Chicago	United States	Aragon Ballroom	Local Natives	—	—
2020
8 March 2020	Okeechobee, FL	United States	Sunshine Grove	—N/a	—	—
