= List of awards and nominations received by Mumford & Sons =

The following is a list of awards and nominations received by Mumford & Sons. Mumford and Sons is a folk rock band from Britain. The band consists of Marcus Mumford, Ben Lovett, and Ted Dwayne. They formed in 2007 in London and since then their discography has been nominated for multiple awards.

== American Music Award ==
The American Music Award is an annual American music awards show, created by Dick Clark in 1973 for ABC when the network's contract to present the Grammy Award expired.

Year	Nominee / work	Award	Result
2011	Mumford & Sons	Favorite Alternative Artist	Nominated
2013	Mumford & Sons	Favorite Alternative Artist	Nominated
2026	Mumford & Sons	Best Americana/Folk Artist	Pending

== Americana Music Honors & Awards ==
The Americana Music Honors & Awards is the marquee event for the Americana Music Association.

Year	Nominee / work	Award	Result
United States
2011	Mumford & Sons	Emerging Artist of the Year	Won
2011	Mumford & Sons	Duo/Group of the Year	Nominated
United Kingdom
2018	Mumford & Sons	Trailblazer Award	Won

== ARIA Music Awards ==
The ARIA Music Awards (Australian Recording Industry Association Music Awards) is an annual series of awards nights celebrating the Music of Australia industry, put on by the Australian Recording Industry Association.

Year	Nominee / work	Award	Result	Lost to
2010	Mumford & Sons	Most Popular International Artist	Won	—N/a
2013	Babel	Best International Artist	Nominated	One Direction - Take Me Home

== Billboard Music Awards ==
The Billboard Music Awards is an honor given by Billboard, a publication and Billboard charts covering the music business.

Year	Nominee / work	Award	Result
2011	Mumford & Sons	Top Rock Artist	Nominated
2011	Mumford & Sons	Top Alternative Artist	Won
2011	Sigh No More	Top Rock Album	Won
2011	Sigh No More	Top Alternative Album	Won
2011	"Little Lion Man"	Top Rock Song	Nominated
2011	"Little Lion Man"	Top Alternative Song	Nominated
2011	"The Cave"	Top Alternative Song	Nominated
2012	Mumford & Sons	Top Rock Artist	Nominated
2012	Mumford & Sons	Top Alternative Artist	Nominated
2012	Sigh No More	Top Rock Album	Nominated
2012	Sigh No More	Top Alternative Album	Nominated
2012	"The Cave"	Top Alternative Song	Nominated
2013	Mumford & Sons	Top Billboard 200 Artist	Nominated
2013	Mumford & Sons	Top Duo/Group	Nominated
2013	Babel	Top Billboard 200 Album	Nominated
2013	Babel	Top Rock Album	Won
2014	Babel	Top Rock Album	Nominated
2016	Wilder Mind	Top Rock Album	Nominated
2019	Delta	Top Rock Album	Nominated

== Brit Awards ==
The Brit Awards are the British Phonographic Industry's annual pop music awards.

Year	Nominee / work	Award	Result
2011	Mumford & Sons	British Group	Nominated
2011	Mumford & Sons	British Breakthrough Act	Nominated
2011	Sigh No More	British Album of the Year	Won
2013	Mumford & Sons	British Group	Won
2013	Mumford & Sons	British Live Act	Nominated
2013	Babel	British Album of the Year	Nominated

== Echo Music Prize ==
The Echo Music Prize is an accolade by the Deutsche Phono-Akademie an association of recording companies of Germany to recognize outstanding achievement in the music industry.

Year	Nominee / work	Award	Result
2013	Mumford & Sons	International Rock/Pop Group	Won

== European Festivals Awards ==
The European Festivals Awards were initiated in 2010 by the European festival association Yourope and the festival website Virtual Festivals Europe.

Year	Nominee / work	Award	Result
2012	Mumford & Sons	Headliner of the Year	Nominated
2012	"Little Lion Man"	Anthem of the Year	Nominated

== GAFFA Awards ==
=== Sweden GAFFA Awards ===
Delivered since 2010, the GAFFA Awards (Swedish: GAFFA Priset) are a Swedish award that rewards popular music awarded by the magazine of the same name.

Year	Nominee / work	Award	Result	Ref.
2012	Babel	Best Foreign Album	Won	
2012	Mumford & Sons	Best Foreign Band	Won	
2015	Mumford & Sons	Best Foreign Band	Won	
2019	Mumford & Sons	Best Foreign Band	Nominated	

== Grammy Awards ==
A Grammy Award is an honor awarded by the National Academy of Recording Arts and Sciences of the United States to recognize outstanding achievement in the mainly English-language music industry.

Year	Nominee / work	Award	Result
2011	Mumford & Sons	Best New Artist	Nominated
2011	"Little Lion Man"	Best Rock Song	Nominated
2012	"The Cave"	Record of the Year	Nominated
2012	"The Cave"	Song of the Year	Nominated
2012	"The Cave"	Best Rock Performance	Nominated
2012	"The Cave"	Best Rock Song	Nominated
2013	Babel	Album of the Year	Won
2013	Babel	Best Americana Album	Nominated
2013	"I Will Wait"	Best Rock Performance	Nominated
2013	"I Will Wait"	Best Rock Song	Nominated
2013	"Learn Me Right" (with Birdy)	Best Song Written for Visual Media	Nominated
2013	Big Easy Express	Best Music Film	Won
2014	The Road To Red Rocks	Best Music Film	Nominated
2027	"Here" (with Chris Stapleton)	Best Country Duo/Group Performance	Pending

== Ivor Novello Awards ==
The Ivor Novello Awards, named after the Cardiff-born entertainer Ivor Novello, are awards for songwriter and composer.

Year	Nominee / work	Award	Result
2014	Mumford & Sons	International Achievement	Won

== Juno Award ==
The Juno Award are presented annually to Canadian musical artists and bands to acknowledge their artistic and technical achievements in all aspects of music.

Year	Nominee / work	Award	Result
2013	Babel	International Album of the Year	Won

== Live UK Music Business Awards ==
Year	Nominee / work	Award	Result
2010	Mumford & Sons	Breakthrough Artiste	Won
2013	Mumford & Sons	Best Festival Performance	Nominated
2015	Mumford & Sons	Best Festival Performance	Nominated

== Mercury Prize ==
The Mercury Prize is an annual music prize awarded for the best album from the United Kingdom and Ireland.

Year	Nominee / work	Award	Result
2010	Sigh No More	Album of the Year	Nominated

== MOJO Awards ==
The Mojo Awards was an awards ceremony that began in 2004 and ended in 2009 by Mojo, a popular music magazine published monthly by Bauer in the United Kingdom.

Year	Nominee / work	Award	Result
2010	Mumford & Sons	Breakthrough Act	Nominated

== MTV Video Music Award ==
An MTV Video Music Award is an award presented by the cable channel MTV to honor the best in the music video medium.

Year	Nominee / work	Award	Result
2010	"Little Lion Man"	Best Cinematography	Nominated
2011	"The Cave"	Best Rock Video	Nominated
2013	"I Will Wait"	Best Rock Video	Nominated

== NME Awards ==
The NME Awards is an annual Popular music awards show in the United Kingdom, founded by the music magazine, NME.

Year	Nominee / work	Award	Result
2010	Mumford & Sons	Best New Band	Nominated

== People's Choice Awards ==
The People's Choice Awards is an American awards show, recognizing the people and the work of popular culture, voted on by the Public.

Year	Nominee / work	Award	Result
2014	Mumford & Sons	Favourite Alternative/Rock Band	Nominated

== Q Awards ==
The Q Awards are the UK's annual music awards run by the music magazine Q.

Year	Nominee / work	Award	Result
2010	Mumford & Sons	Best New Act	Won
2010	"The Cave"	Best Track	Nominated
2013	Mumford & Sons	Best Live Act	Nominated
2015	Mumford & Sons	Best Live Act	Nominated

== Silver Clef Award ==
The Silver Clef Award is an annual United Kingdom Popular music awards lunch which has been running since 1976.

Year	Nominee / work	Award	Result
2013	Mumford & Sons	Best Live Act	Nominated

== Teen Choice Awards ==
The Teen Choice Awards is an annual awards show that airs on the Fox television network.

Year	Nominee / work	Award	Result
2013	Mumford & Sons	Choice Rock Group	Nominated

== UK Festival Awards ==
The UK Festival Awards are awarded annually, with various categories for all aspects of festivals that have taken place in the United Kingdom, and one category for European festivals.

Year	Nominee / work	Award	Result
2010	Mumford & Sons	VF Critics' Choice	Nominated
2010	Mumford & Sons	Breakthrough Artist	Won
2010	Mumford & Sons	Headline Performance	Nominated
2010	"The Cave"	Anthem of the Year	Nominated

== UK Music Video Awards ==
The UK Music Video Awards is an annual celebration of creativity, technical excellence and innovation in music video and moving image for music.

Year	Nominee / work	Award	Result
2013	The Road to Red Rocks	Best Live Music Coverage	Nominated
2015	The Hospital Live Sessions	Best Live Music Coverage	Nominated
