= If I Say =

Promotional single by Mumford & Sons

from the album Delta
- Released: 25 October 2018
- Recorded: 2017
- Genre: Orchestral pop
- Length: 4:29
- Label: Gentlemen of the Road; Island; Glassnote
- Songwriter(s): Marcus Mumford; Winston Marshall; Ben Lovett; Ted Dwane
- Producer(s): Paul Epworth

Mumford & Sons singles chronology
"Guiding Light" (2018)	"If I Say" (2018)	"Beloved" (2019)

"If I Say" is a song by English rock band Mumford & Sons. It was released as a promotional single from their fourth studio album, Delta, on 25 October 2018. The song was written by Marcus Mumford, Winston Marshall, Ben Lovett and Ted Dwane. The band began playing the track live in May 2017. A studio version of the song could be heard on a livestream from the band’s Instagram account in April 2018.

== Composition ==
Jordan Bassett of NME described the song as having "full-blown orchestral arrangements".

== Track listing ==
Digital download
No.	Title	Length
1.	"If I Say"	4:29

== Charts ==
Chart (2018)	Peak position
UK Singles Downloads (OCC)	73
US Alternative Digital Song Sales (Billboard)	4
US Hot Rock & Alternative Songs (Billboard)	18

== Release history ==
Region	Date	Format	Label
United Kingdom	25 October 2018	Digital download	Gentlemen of the Road; Island; Glassnote
