= Wona =

Single by Mumford & Sons, Baaba Maal, The Very Best & Beatenberg

from the album Johannesburg
- Released: 13 June 2016
- Recorded: 2015
- Length: 4:00
- Label: Gentlemen of the Road; Island; Glassnote

Mumford & Sons singles chronology
"There Will Be Time" (2016)	"Wona" (2016)	"Guiding Light" (2018)

"Wona" is a song by English rock band Mumford & Sons, Baaba Maal, The Very Best and Beatenberg. It was released as the second single from their extended play, Johannesburg, on 13 June 2016.

== Track listing ==
Digital download
No.	Title	Length
1.	"Wona"	4:00

== Chart performance ==
Chart (2016)	Peak position
Belgium (Ultratip Bubbling Under Flanders)	25

== Release history ==
Region	Date	Format	Label
United Kingdom	13 June 2016	Digital download	Gentlemen of the Road; Island; Glassnote
