= Esau Mwamwaya and Radioclit are the Very Best =

Esau Mwamwaya and Radioclit are The Very Best

Mixtape by The Very Best
- Released: 1 November 2008
- Recorded: 2008
- Genre: Electronic, Malawian
- Length: 58:54
- Label: Independent
- Producer: Radioclit

The Very Best chronology
Esau Mwamwaya and Radioclit are The Very Best (2008)	Warm Heart of Africa (2009)

Professional ratings
Review scores
Source	Rating
Pitchfork	(8.6/10)

Esau Mwamwaya and Radioclit are The Very Best is the debut mixtape for the Very Best. The album was released as a free download containing 15 tracks. Pitchfork included the album in its "Best New Music" section on December 4, 2008 and also included the lead track "Kamphopo" on its list of the top 100 tracks of 2008, coming in at number 63. The album ranked number 40 on Pitchfork's list of best albums of 2008.

== Track listing ==
1. "Kamphopo" (Samples "Heart It Races" by Architecture In Helsinki) – 2:57
2. "Wena" (Samples "Wena" by DJ Cleo) – 4:05
3. "Tengazako" (Samples "Paper Planes" by M.I.A.) – 3:21
4. "Chikondi" (Samples "You're so Cool (Theme from "True Romance")" by Hans Zimmer) – 2:43
5. "Cape Cod Kwassa Kwassa" (Samples "Cape Cod Kwassa Kwassa" by Vampire Weekend) – 3:30
6. "Hide & Seek" (Samples "Bâtard Sensible" by TTC) – 4:05
7. "Salota" (Samples "Life's Ill" by Cannibal Ox) – 3:42
8. "Boyz" (Samples "Boyz" by M.I.A.) – 3:31
9. "Sister Betina" (Samples "Sister Betina" by Mgarimbe) - 3:48
10. "Birthday" (Cover of "Birthday" by The Beatles) featuring Ruby Suns – 4:02
11. "Funa Funa" (Samples "Chiquitita" by ABBA) - 3:10
12. "Kadja Manja" (Classical) - 4:34
13. "Dinosaur On The Ark" (Samples "Dinosaur on the Ark" by Bermuda) - 5:39
14. "Get It Up" featuring M.I.A. - 3:04
15. "Will You Be There" (Samples "Will You Be There" by Michael Jackson) - 6:56
