= Blind Leading the Blind (Mumford & Sons song) =

Single by Mumford & Sons
- Released: 21 October 2019
- Length: 3:44
- Label: Glassnote
- Songwriter(s): Marcus Mumford; Winston Marshall; Ben Lovett; Ted Dwane
- Producer(s): Paul Epworth

Mumford & Sons singles chronology
| "Woman" (2019) | "Blind Leading the Blind" (2019) | "Forever (Garage Version)" (2020) |

"Blind Leading the Blind" is a song by English rock band Mumford & Sons. It was released as a single on 21 October 2019. The song was written by Marcus Mumford, Winston Marshall, Ben Lovett and Ted Dwane.

== Background ==
The band originally debuted "Blind Leading the Blind" live in 2016 and initially recorded the song during their Delta studio sessions, produced by Paul Epworth at The Church Studios in London.

Marcus Mumford stated in the press release for the song that "Blind Leading the Blind has been a song we’ve had up our sleeves for some time, which ended up being a catalytic song for much of our work on Delta, its themes and feelings, but that we never got round to finishing in time to put it on the original release." It also stated that the band got "renewed focus" from receiving the John Steinbeck Award at San Jose State University and that the song touched "on subjects pertinent to Steinbeck’s extended literary works".

American author John Steinbeck’s work is a common influence for the band. The band’s songs "Dust Bowl Dance", "Timshel", and "Rose of Sharon" also reflect on Steinbeck’s works.

== Music video ==
The "Blind Leading the Blind (Live from Austin City Limits)" music video was shot at Austin City Limits Music Festival Weekend One on 6 Aug 2019 and released on 25 Oct 2019. Another music video was released onto YouTube on 6 December 2019. Both videos were directed by Nick Davies, a previous collaborator of the band. Marcus Mumford said “Working with Nick Davies made the process of making this an absolute privilege. Given our long history of work together, it was a complete joy to be under his direction again. We wanted to access the nature of the song, including some of its anger, introspection and even self-flagellation. A drum kit and an old sweaty laundry in Bangkok while on tour provided all we needed.

== Charts ==
=== Weekly charts ===
| Chart (2019) | Peak position |
|---|---|
| Belgium (Ultratip Bubbling Under Flanders) | 13 |
| Czech Republic (Top 20 Modern Rock) | 18 |
| US Alternative Airplay (Billboard) | 14 |
| US Hot Rock & Alternative Songs (Billboard) | 12 |

=== Year-end charts ===
| Chart (2020) | Position |
|---|---|
| US Adult Alternative Songs (Billboard) | 27 |
| US Alternative Songs (Billboard) | 50 |

== Release history ==
| Region | Date | Format | Label |
|---|---|---|---|
| United Kingdom | 21 October 2019 | Digital download | Universal Music |
