= Warm Heart of Africa =

Studio album by The Very Best
- Released: 6 October 2009
- Recorded: 2009
- Genre: Electronic, Malawian, Dance
- Length: 47:54
- Label: Green Owl
- Producer: Radioclit

The Very Best chronology
Esau Mwamwaya and Radioclit are the Very Best (2008)	Warm Heart of Africa (2009)	Super Mom (2011)

Professional ratings
Review scores
Source	Rating
Allmusic	3.5/5 stars
The Arts Section	(Positive)
Drowned in Sound	(8/10)
The Guardian	4/5 stars
NME	(8/10)
Pitchfork Media	(8.6/10)
PopMatters	(8/10)
Rolling Stone	3.5/5 stars

Warm Heart of Africa is the debut studio album for the Very Best. The album was released digitally on August 25, 2009, and physically on October 6, 2009. Rhapsody deemed it the 18th best album of 2009.

== Track listing ==
1. "Yalira" – 3:44 ^{(mp3)}
2. "Chalo" – 3:14
3. "Warm Heart of Africa" (featuring Ezra Koenig) – 3:49
4. "Mwazi" – 1:08
5. "Nsokoto" – 5:30
6. "Angonde" – 4:54
7. "Julia" – 4:08
8. "Mfumu" – 3:52
9. "Ntende Uli" - 3:21
10. "Rain Dance" (featuring M.I.A.) – 4:28 ^{(mp3)}
11. "Kamphopo" - 3:13
12. "Kada Manja - 4:35
13. "Zam'dziko - 2:27
