= MTMTMK =

Studio album by The Very Best
- Released: July 16, 2012
- Recorded: Lilongwe, Malawi
- Genre: African, synthpop
- Label: Moshi Moshi
- Producer: The Smeezingtons

The Very Best chronology
Super Mom (2011)	MTMTMK (2012)

MTMTMK is an album by London-based DJ and production duo the Very Best, released 16 July 2012 under the Moshi Moshi label. Recorded in Lilongwe, Malawi, MTMTMK retains the distinctive combination of African flair and synthpop dance beats found in earlier albums, but adds an even more international flavor thanks to collaborations from such diverse artists like Swedish DJ producer Johan Hugo and African music legends Baaba Maal and Amadou & Miriam, to modern-pop stars Bruno Mars and Taio Cruz.

== Track listing ==
1. "Adani" - 4:33
2. "Kondaine" - 3:35
3. "Rumbae" - 3:45
4. "Moto" - 3:52
5. "Yoshua Alikuti" - 4:13
6. "Bantu" - 3:47
7. "I Wanna Go Away" - 2:58
8. "Come Alive" - 4:01
9. "Mghetto" - 3:59
10. "Nkango" - 1:29
11. "Rudeboy" - 3:51
12. "We OK" featuring K'naan - 4:36
13. "Rudeboy (Remix)" - 3:37
