= HVOB =

Austrian electronic music duo

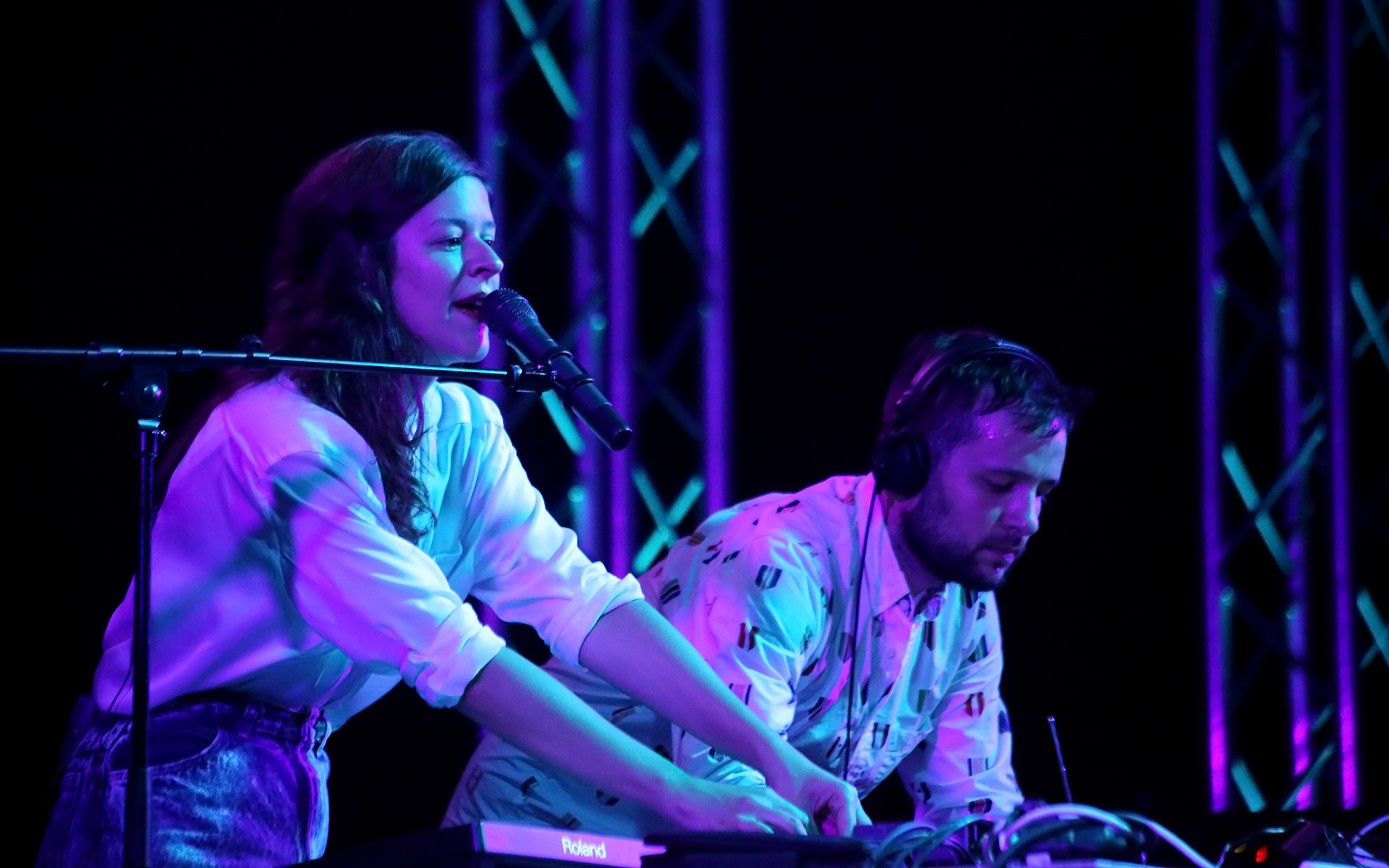
- HVOB performing in 2013

Background information
- Also known as: Her Voice Over Boys
- Origin: Vienna, Austria
- Genres: Electronica
- Years active: 2012–present
- Label: Stil vor Talent
- Members: Anna Müller; Paul Wallner

HVOB (for Her Voice Over Boys) is an Austrian electronic duo founded in Vienna by Anna Müller and Paul Wallner.

== Biography ==
Anna Müller and Paul Wallner, formerly members of the Austrian band Herbstrock, formed HVOB in 2012.. The duo focuses on "restrained and minimalist" electronica with the use of vocals. After releasing music on SoundCloud they were discovered by Oliver Koletzki, a German dance and house music producer. Koletzki contracted the duo and they later appeared at the Melt! Festival. Their first EP Dogs was released in 2012.

In 2013, the band released its first album HVOB. Their second album Trialog released in 2015 was said by American Thump magazine "as a contender for an 'Album of the Year' award".

In 2015, the duo toured India and went to various cities including Bangalore. The duo has been "voted as one of the best live acts in the world".

In 2017, the group released their third album, Silk, with collaborator Winston Marshall. Jamie McNamara of BeatRoute describe the first track on the album as "moody atmosphere and guitar-led dance music". In 2018 the group performed a sold-out show at the Mezzanine in San Francisco.

In 2019, the group released their fourth album, Rocco.

HVOB released their fifth studio album, TOO, in 2022 through Play It Again Sam Records.

In 2025, HVOB composed the soundtrack for the documentary To Close Your Eyes and See Fire. At the 2025 Filmfestival Max Ophüls Preis, HVOB and the directors received the award for Best Music in a Documentary Film.

== Discography ==
- HVOB (2013)
- Trialog (2015)
- Silk (2017)
- Rocco (2019)
- TOO (2022)
- To Close Your Eyes And See Fire (OST) (2025)
