= Johannesburg (EP) =

EP by Mumford & Sons
- Released: 17 June 2016
- Recorded: Early 2016 in Johannesburg, South Africa
- Length: 20:31
- Label: Island
- Producers: Mumford & Sons; Johan Hugo

Mumford & Sons chronology
| Wilder Mind (2015) | Johannesburg (2016) | Delta (2018) |

Singles from Johannesburg
- 1. "There Will Be Time" Released: 16 April 2016; 2. "Wona" Released: 13 June 2016

Professional ratings
Aggregate scores
| Source | Rating |
|---|---|
| Metacritic | 64/100 |
Review scores
| Source | Rating |
| AllMusic | 3.5/5 stars |
| Consequence of Sound | C |
| The Independent | 3/5 stars |
| NME | 3/5 |
| Rolling Stone | 2.5/5 stars |
| Spin | 5/10 |

Johannesburg is the tenth extended play by British folk rock band Mumford & Sons, which was recorded during the band's tour in South Africa in early 2016. It is a collaboration with Senegalese singer Baaba Maal, South African pop group Beatenberg, and Malawian-British singer-producer combo the Very Best. The EP was released on 17 June 2016 through Island Records.

== Track listing ==
| No. | Title | Featured artist(s) | Length |
|---|---|---|---|
| 1. | "There Will Be Time" | Baaba Maal | 4:27 |
| 2. | "Wona" | Baaba Maal, The Very Best & Beatenberg | 4:00 |
| 3. | "Fool You've Landed" | The Very Best & Beatenberg | 3:41 |
| 4. | "Ngamila" | Baaba Maal & The Very Best | 3:37 |
| 5. | "Si Tu Veux" | Baaba Maal & The Very Best | 4:46 |

== Personnel ==
Credits adapted from AllMusic

- Mumford & Sons – primary artist, production
- Baaba Maal – featured artist
- The Very Best – featured artist
- Beatenberg – featured artist
- Johan Hugo – production
- Dan Grech-Marguerat – additional production, programming
- Michael Brauer – mixing
- Bob Ludwig – mastering
- Chris Maas – photography
- David East – photography
- Ross Stirling – artwork

== Charts ==
=== Weekly charts ===
| Chart (2016) | Peak position |
|---|---|
| Australia (ARIA) | 61 |
| Austrian Albums (Ö3 Austria) | 8 |
| Canadian Albums (Billboard) | 4 |
| German Albums (Offizielle Top 100) | 41 |
| New Zealand Albums (RMNZ) | 17 |
| Spain (Promusicae) | 36 |
| Swedish Albums (Sverigetopplistan) | 35 |
| Swiss Albums (Schweizer Hitparade) | 6 |
| UK Albums (Official Charts) | 6 |
| US Billboard 200 | 9 |
| US Top Alternative Albums (Billboard) | 3 |
| US Top Rock Albums (Billboard) | 3 |
| US World Albums (Billboard) | 1 |

=== Year-end charts ===
| Chart (2016) | Position |
|---|---|
| US Top Rock Albums (Billboard) | 64 |
