= Delta (Mumford & Sons album) =

Studio album by Mumford & Sons
- Released: 16 November 2018
- Studios: The Church (London); Electric Lady (New York); Scarlet Pimpernel (Devon); RAK (London); Studio G (Franklin); Angel (London)
- Genre: Pop
- Length: 61:48
- Labels: Island; Glassnote; Gentlemen of the Road
- Producer: Paul Epworth

Mumford & Sons chronology
Johannesburg (2016)	Delta (2018)	Delta Tour EP (2020)

Singles from Delta
- 1. "Guiding Light" Released: 20 September 2018; 2. "Beloved" Released: 22 February 2019; 3. "Woman" Released: 10 May 2019

Delta is the fourth studio album by British folk rock band Mumford & Sons. It was released on 16 November 2018 through Gentlemen of the Road, Island Records and Glassnote. The album was recorded at The Church Studios in London with producer Paul Epworth. The album was supported by three singles, "Guiding Light", "Beloved", and "Woman", and managed to reach number one on the US Billboard 200 and number two on the UK Albums Chart. Delta was their last album with guitarist and banjoist Winston Marshall before his departure in 2021.

== Recording ==
The band recorded more than 25 songs with Paul Epworth at The Church Studios, and were intent on keeping the "collaborative spirit" of their live shows and 2016 EP Johannesburg. Marcus Mumford has said that much of the album was recorded in "non-gender specific Friday night lads sessions" with friends where they would play music, "smoke cigarettes and have a great time". Around 100 people were involved in these sessions, with some being featured on the record, including American singer-songwriters Maggie Rogers and Gill Landry.

== Music and themes ==
Delta has been called an album that "draw[s] on the shared experience of being on and off" tour, and distinct from the band's "anthemic" previous album, 2015's Wilder Mind, in that it is more "tender", "introspective and reflective". It incorporates elements of electronica, rap and jazz. It has been said to still contain the "intimacy and jubilance" that the band is known for, but keyboard player Ben Lovett said it is also concerned with "the four Ds: death, divorce, drugs and depression". Mumford spoke to Annie Mac about reusing folk instruments they did not use on Wilder Mind but being "conscious [about] how we can make these instruments sound not like these instruments which opened up a whole new world for us".

Larry Fritzmaurice of Pitchfork compared the album to pop acts Imagine Dragons and Twenty One Pilots, while heavily comparing the album's length and structure to British rock band Coldplay's album X&Y, noting they both share an "imposing length". Piper Westrom of Riff Magazine stated that, in contrast to Wilder Mind's rock-oriented sound, Delta is a pop album.

== Promotion ==
=== Singles ===
On 20 September 2018, the band released the lead single, "Guiding Light", followed by "If I Say", a promotional single on 25 October 2018. On 22 February 2019, "Beloved" was released as the album's second single, followed shortly after by an accompanying music video. "Woman" was released as the album's third and final single on 10 May 2019. Following the initial album cycle, the band released "Blind Leading the Blind", a song recorded during the Delta sessions but was not included on the final release. During the COVID-19 pandemic, the band released an early demo of the track "Forever", titled "Forever (Garage Version)", on 8 May 2020.

=== Tour and Live EP ===
The band embarked on the Delta Tour in promotion of the album, which began in November 2018. To commemorate the end of the tour, which was cut short by the COVID-19 pandemic, the band released a six-track live EP titled Delta Tour EP, which consisted of various live recordings from the tour. The release included live covers of "Hurt" by Nine Inch Nails, "Blood" by the Middle East, and "With a Little Help from My Friends" by the Beatles. Featured guest artists included Gang of Youths and the Milk Carton Kids.

== Critical reception ==
Professional ratings
Aggregate scores
Source	Rating
AnyDecentMusic?	5.5/10
Metacritic	59/100
Review scores
Source	Rating
AllMusic	2.5/5 stars
Consequence of Sound	B−
The Daily Telegraph	5/5 stars
Entertainment Weekly	B+
The Guardian	2/5 stars
The Independent	3/5 stars
NME	3/5 stars
Pitchfork	5.8/10
Q	3/5 stars
Rolling Stone	2/5 stars
The Times	4/5 stars

Delta received mixed reviews from music critics. At Metacritic, which assigns a normalized rating out of 100 to reviews from mainstream critics, the album received an average score of 59, based on 18 reviews, which indicates "mixed or average reviews".

== Commercial performance ==
Delta debuted at number one on the US Billboard 200 with 237,000 album-equivalent units, including 214,000 pure album sales. It is Mumford & Sons' third US number-one album. It was beaten to the top spot in the UK by Michael Bublé's Love.

== Track listing ==
All tracks are written by Mumford & Sons (Marcus Mumford, Ben Lovett, Winston Marshall, and Ted Dwane).

No.	Title	Length
1.	"42"	4:00
2.	"Guiding Light"	3:37
3.	"Woman"	4:34
4.	"Beloved"	4:25
5.	"The Wild"	5:31
6.	"October Skies"	3:43
7.	"Slip Away"	4:55
8.	"Rose of Sharon"	3:23
9.	"Picture You"	4:03
10.	"Darkness Visible"	3:11
11.	"If I Say"	4:29
12.	"Wild Heart"	5:05
13.	"Forever"	4:36
14.	"Delta"	6:16
Total length:		61:48

Japanese edition bonus track
No.	Title	Length
15.	"Guiding Light" (acoustic; live from Electric Lady)	4:05
Total length:		66:04

Target and HMV deluxe edition bonus tracks
No.	Title	Length
15.	"Woman" (acoustic; live from Electric Lady)
16.	"Guiding Light" (acoustic; live from Electric Lady)	4:05
17.	"Wild Heart" (acoustic; live from Electric Lady)

Note

- "Darkness Visible" contains a reading from Paradise Lost, written by John Milton.

== Personnel ==
=== Mumford & Sons ===
- Marcus Mumford – performance
- Ben Lovett – performance
- Winston Marshall – performance
- Ted Dwane – performance

=== Additional musicians ===
- Paul Epworth – instrumentation
- Yebba – additional vocals (tracks 1, 4, 6, 8)
- Mamadou Sarr – instrumentation (tracks 3, 4, 8)
- Sally Herbert – string arrangement, conductor (tracks 5, 11)
- Tom Pigott Smith – orchestra leader (tracks 5, 11)
- Maggie Rogers – additional vocals (track 8)
- Gill Landry – instrumentation, spoken word (track 10)
- Chris Maas – instrumentation (track 11)
- Rob Moose – string arrangement, string performance (track 13)
- Evelyn – extra voices (track 14)
- Wilfred – extra voices (track 14)

=== Technical ===
- Paul Epworth – production
- Randy Merrill – mastering
- Tom Elmhirst – mixing
- Riley MacIntyre – engineering (all tracks), brass recording (tracks 5, 11)
- Jeremy Murphy – orchestra recording (tracks 5, 11)
- Luke Pickering – additional engineering
- Jonathan Low – additional engineering (track 1)
- Steph Marziano – additional engineering (track 2)
- Garrett Miller – additional engineering (tracks 3, 9, 10)
- Rob Brinkmann – additional engineering (track 3)
- Chris Pollard – additional engineering (track 5)
- Chloe Kraemer – engineering assistance
- Mark "Wiff" Smith – technician

=== Visuals ===
- Ross Stirling – creative direction, design
- Alistar Taylor-Young – photography
- Auguste Taylor-Young – photography assistance
- Marcus Haney – additional photography
- Louis Browne – additional portrait photography
- Alex Page – additional portrait photography
- Erik Hedman – creative consultation

== Charts ==
=== Weekly charts ===
Chart (2018)	Peak position
Australian Albums (ARIA)	5
Austrian Albums (Ö3 Austria)	3
Belgian Albums (Ultratop Flanders)	3
Belgian Albums (Ultratop Wallonia)	30
Canadian Albums (Billboard)	1
Czech Albums (ČNS IFPI)	39
Danish Albums (Hitlisten)	28
Dutch Albums (Album Top 100)	1
Finnish Albums (Suomen virallinen lista)	21
French Albums (SNEP)	114
German Albums (Offizielle Top 100)	5
Irish Albums (IRMA)	3
Italian Albums (FIMI)	18
Japanese Albums (Oricon)	195
Latvian Albums (LAIPA)	23
New Zealand Albums (RMNZ)	4
Norwegian Albums (VG-lista)	6
Scottish Albums (Official Charts)	3
Spanish Albums (Promusicae)	17
Swedish Albums (Sverigetopplistan)	1
Swiss Albums (Schweizer Hitparade)	2
UK Albums (Official Charts)	2
US Billboard 200	1
US Top Rock Albums (Billboard)	1

=== Year-end charts ===
Chart (2018)	Position
Belgian Albums (Ultratop Flanders)	69
Dutch Albums (MegaCharts)	65
UK Albums (OCC)	47

Chart (2019)	Position
Belgian Albums (Ultratop Flanders)	72
Canadian Albums (Billboard)	29
Dutch Albums (Album Top 100)	94
US Billboard 200	100
US Top Rock Albums (Billboard)	15

== Certifications ==
Region	Certification	Certified units/sales
Austria (IFPI Austria)	Gold	7,500^{‡}
Canada (Music Canada)	Gold	40,000^{‡}
New Zealand (RMNZ)	Gold	7,500^{‡}
United Kingdom (BPI)	Gold	136,788
^{‡} Sales+streaming figures based on certification alone.
