= There Will Be Time (song) =

Single by Mumford & Sons and Baaba Maal

from the EP Johannesburg
- Released: 16 April 2016
- Recorded: 2015
- Length: 4:27
- Label: Gentlemen of the Road; Island; Glassnote

Mumford & Sons singles chronology
"Just Smoke" (2016)	"There Will Be Time" (2016)	"Wona" (2016)

"There Will Be Time" is a song by English rock band Mumford & Sons and Baaba Maal. It was released as the lead single from their extended play, Johannesburg, on 16 April 2016. The song peaked at number 100 on the UK Singles Chart.

== Charts ==
Chart (2016)	Peak position
Belgium (Ultratip Bubbling Under Flanders)	17
Canada Rock (Billboard)	48
Scotland (OCC)	40
Sweden Heatseeker (Sverigetopplistan)	3
UK Singles (OCC)	100
US Hot Rock & Alternative Songs (Billboard)	22
US Rock Airplay (Billboard)	49

== Release history ==
Region	Date	Format	Label
United Kingdom	16 April 2016	Digital download	Gentlemen of the Road; Island; Glassnote
