= Winter Winds =

Single by Mumford & Sons

from the album Sigh No More
- B-side: "Hold On to What You Believe"
- Released: 6 December 2009
- Recorded: 2009
- Genre: Indie folk; Soul
- Length: 3:39
- Label: Island
- Songwriter(s): Winston Marshall
- Producer(s): Markus Dravs

Mumford & Sons singles chronology
"Little Lion Man" (2009)	"Winter Winds" (2009)	"The Cave" (2010)

Music video
- "Winter Winds" on YouTube

"Winter Winds" is the second single by the London folk quartet Mumford & Sons, released from their debut album, Sigh No More. It was released in the UK on 6 December 2009, where it peaked at number 44; in Belgium it reached number 29.

== Critical reception ==
Fraser McAlpine of the BBC Chart Blog gave the song a positive 5-star review, stating that it would serve as an "amazing Christmas carol equivalent" for a 'winterval' type holiday, as "it's quietly optimistic, pleased without being smug, melancholy but uplifting, " and "sure of itself, but only because all the lessons learned have been hard-won, and generally reflective of times gone by".

== Music video ==
In an interview with The A.V. Club, Marcus Mumford said the idea for the video coincides with the writing of the song. "We didn't want to make something that had multiple interpretations and ideas coming from every side. We wanted to express the song. When we were writing [Winter Winds] I was in a pretty chaotic relationship. When we were good we were great but when we weren't, it was horrid. And she continually had put in time and energy to sustain this relationship and something in me wouldn't allow it to. So here I was fighting a feeling, of she's wonderful, she's this, she's that, and still I didn't want her completely. And here she was fighting me, trying to save this sinking ship. We wanted the video to reflect that. You're constantly fighting the wind, and that's what this relationship probably was for [her]. For both of us. Fighting a losing battle, going against the wind" Mumford has stated it is his favorite song to sing live. Shooting for the video took place in November 2008, at Blue Bell Hill in Kent. Many of the scenes utilised the Kits Coty field. On the night of its debut on YouTube the video hit 250,000 views, breaking the release record previously held by Lady Gaga, of 200,000 views. It is now praised as a "wintertime" song, and featured on multiple Christmas albums.

== Track listing ==
- CD single

No.	Title	Length
1.	"Winter Winds"	3:39
2.	"Hold On to What You Believe"	4:02

== Charts ==
"Winter Winds" debuted on the UK Singles Chart on 30 November 2009 at number 99. The following week, the single climbed 26 places to number 73 before climbing to number 48 on 13 December 2009. The single climbed a single place to number 47 the following week, before reaching a peak of number 44 on 27 December 2009. The song then dropped to number 86 the week after, eventually dropping out on 24 January 2010, meaning it spent a total of 9 weeks within the top 100.

Chart (2009)	Peak position
Belgium (Ultratop 50 Flanders)	29
Scotland (OCC)	32
UK Singles (OCC)	44

== Release history ==
Region	Date	Format	Label
United Kingdom	6 December 2009	Digital download	Island Records
United Kingdom	7 December 2009	CD single	Island Records
