= Roll Away Your Stone =

Single by Mumford & Sons

from the album Sigh No More
- Released: 3 June 2010
- Recorded: 2009
- Genre: Indie folk; bluegrass
- Length: 4:23
- Label: Island
- Songwriter(s): Ted Dwane, Ben Lovett, Marcus Mumford, Country Marshall
- Producer(s): Markus Dravs

Mumford & Sons singles chronology
"The Cave" (2010)	"Roll Away Your Stone" (2010)	"I Will Wait" (2012)

"Roll Away Your Stone" is the fourth single by London rock quartet, Mumford & Sons, taken from their debut album, Sigh No More. It was released as a digital download on 3 June 2010 and was the third and final single released from Sigh No More in the United States on 7 June 2011. The song begins with an instrumental version of the Irish jig, "Merrily Kissed the Quaker". The song appeared in the 2012 documentary film, Kony 2012.

The song includes a reference to Macbeth. The repeated line, "stars hide your fires", is also spoken by Macbeth, who conceals his ambition for the throne in Act 1 of the play.

== Track listing ==
- iTunes single/CD single/7" vinyl

No.	Title	Length
1.	"Roll Away Your Stone"	4:23
2.	"White Blank Page" (live at Shepherd's Bush Empire)	4:20

== Chart performance ==
Despite being added to BBC Radio 1's A Playlist in May 2010, the single failed to crack the top 100 upon physical release in June. The single managed to peak at number 141 on the UK Singles Chart.

=== Weekly charts ===
Chart (2010–2011)	Peak position
Belgium (Ultratip Bubbling Under Flanders)	15
UK Singles (OCC)	141
US Adult Alternative Songs (Billboard)	5
US Alternative Airplay (Billboard)	10
US Hot Rock & Alternative Songs (Billboard)	11

=== Year-end charts ===
Chart (2011)	Position
US Hot Rock & Alternative Songs (Billboard)	43

== Certifications ==
Region	Certification	Certified units/sales
United Kingdom (BPI)	Silver	200,000^{‡}
^{‡} Sales+streaming figures based on certification alone.

== Release history ==
Region	Date	Format	Label
United Kingdom	3 June 2010	Digital download	Island
United Kingdom	7 June 2010	CD single	Island
United Kingdom	7 June 2010	7" vinyl	Island
United States	7 June 2011	Radio	Glassnote
