= Guiding Light (song) =

Single by Mumford & Sons

from the album Delta
- Released: 20 September 2018
- Recorded: 2017
- Genre: Folk rock; folk-pop
- Length: 3:37
- Label: Gentlemen of the Road; Island; Glassnote
- Songwriter(s): Marcus Mumford; Winston Marshall; Ben Lovett; Ted Dwane
- Producer(s): Paul Epworth

Mumford & Sons singles chronology
"Wona" (2016)	"Guiding Light" (2018)	"Beloved" (2019)

"Guiding Light" is a song by English rock band Mumford & Sons. It was released as the lead single from their fourth studio album, Delta, on 20 September 2018. The song peaked at number 40 on the UK Singles Chart.

== Background ==
The song was first played live at Sziget Festival 2018, as one of three new songs the band played. On 19 September 2018, an audio snippet from the song was released on the band's Twitter page. Guiding Light premiered on 20 September 2018 on BBC Radio 1. Speaking to Annie Mac on Radio 1 about the single, Marcus Mumford said: "It was a bit of a beast to try and get on record. It was hard work. We kind of tried it in loads of different ways...this one took a while. We wrote it like a year ago, but it’s taken a while to just get it to that point and now we're happy with it." A lyric video was released simultaneously with the premiere of the track. The song made its television debut on the Tonight Show with Jimmy Fallon, and was later played on The Graham Norton Show, Saturday Night Live, and BBC Live Lounge, with acoustic performances at Radio.com and Sirius XM.

== Composition ==
Elizabeth Aubrey of NME described "Guiding Light" as a "dizzying folk-rock song that builds, builds, explodes and then explodes again". Joshua Copperman of Spin dubbed it a "solid folk-pop song". Jon Dolan of Rolling Stone described the song as having "angelic electronics" and instrumentation that recalls "West African guitar blues".

== Music video ==
The official video premiered on 17 October 2018; it uses footage from the band's mini-concert, originally filmed outside the Tate Modern in London on 21 September 2018.

== Track listing ==
Digital download
No.	Title	Length
1.	"Guiding Light"	3:37

== Charts ==
=== Weekly charts ===
Chart (2018–2019)	Peak position
Belgium (Ultratip Bubbling Under Flanders)	2
Belgium (Ultratip Bubbling Under Wallonia)	17
Canada (Canadian Hot 100)	69
Canada Rock (Billboard)	6
Finland Airplay (Radiosoittolista)	83
Iceland (Tónlistinn)	9
Ireland (IRMA)	52
Netherlands Single Tip (MegaCharts)	13
New Zealand Hot Singles (RMNZ)	28
Scotland (OCC)	14
Sweden (Sverigetopplistan)	98
Switzerland (Schweizer Hitparade)	86
UK Singles (OCC)	40
US Bubbling Under Hot 100 (Billboard)	6
US Adult Pop Airplay (Billboard)	17
US Hot Rock & Alternative Songs (Billboard)	5
US Rock & Alternative Airplay (Billboard)	2

=== Year-end charts ===
Chart (2018)	Position
US Hot Rock Songs (Billboard)	55

Chart (2019)	Position
US Hot Rock Songs (Billboard)	18
US Rock Airplay Songs (Billboard)	15

=== All-time charts ===
All-time chart performance for "Guiding Light"
Chart	Position
US Adult Alternative Airplay (Billboard)	11

== Certifications ==
Region	Certification	Certified units/sales
Canada (Music Canada)	Gold	40,000^{‡}
United Kingdom (BPI)	Silver	200,000^{‡}
^{‡} Sales+streaming figures based on certification alone.

== Release history ==
Region	Date	Format	Label
United Kingdom	20 September 2018	Digital download	Gentlemen of the Road; Island; Glassnote
