= Woman (Mumford & Sons song) =

Single by Mumford & Sons

from the album Delta
- Released: 10 May 2019
- Genre: Indie R&B
- Length: 4:34
- Label: Gentlemen of the Road; Island; Glassnote
- Songwriters: Marcus Mumford; Winston Marshall; Ben Lovett; Ted Dwane
- Producer: Paul Epworth

Mumford & Sons singles chronology
"Beloved" (2019)	"Woman" (2019)	"Blind Leading the Blind" (2019)

"Woman" is a song by English rock band Mumford & Sons. It was released as the third single from their fourth studio album, Delta (2018), on 10 May 2019. The song was written by Marcus Mumford, Winston Marshall, Ben Lovett and Ted Dwane.

== Composition ==
Mumford & Sons started writing music for their fourth album Delta several years before it was released. While the other members were in Brooklyn, guitarist and banjoist Winston Marshall began work on some of the songs on the album in Nashville, where his then-girlfriend Dianna Agron was filming a movie and they became engaged. (Note: Marshall and Agron split in 2019.) Marshall had been encouraged by sound engineer Garrett Miller to try more synthesized music, and composed the first verse and the falsetto hook of "Woman" in Nashville. When he took it back to the other members, pianist Ben Lovett described first hearing the song by saying: "[it] just felt like something that was very, very different, but also felt really good. Maybe that was a moment that we felt unshackled by anything that we had done previously." Marshall said that the song took a long time to finish, and "really came together" when Paul Epworth, the album's producer, got involved.

Marshall said that despite the song title, "Woman" is about the love shared by the couple. It is an indie R&B song, and was influenced by Jai Paul. Rolling Stone felt that it sounds like Khalid songs. The song uses banjo, but it is disguised. Marshall used a five-string cello banjo, and there are three banjo tracks layered. The banjo is also pitched down an octave, more like a synth track.

== Music videos ==
A lyric video for "Woman" was released on 3 December 2018, with videography from National Geographic featuring a woodland full of butterflies and elephants roaming the savanna, as part of the "Mumford & Sons + National Geographic Present Delta" series. It had originally been shown on 15 November 2018 at a screening release of the visual album.

A music video to accompany the release of the single was first published on YouTube on 4 June 2019. The music video was filmed in New York, directed by James Marcus Haney and choreographed by Kristin Sudeikis. The video stars Forward Space company dancers Yeman Brown and Stephanie Crousillat as a couple dancing together, around a studio and in front of the New York skyline, captured on a handheld camcorder. The video came about after Marshall watched Brown perform an improvised dance routine to Beyoncé's "Halo" at Forward Space, having been introduced by Agron. Marshall said: "My heart went into my throat and I was quite literally moved to tears. It stole my breath away. I didn't know dance could make you feel that way."

== Cover artwork ==
The cover art is in grayscale and depicts a forearm with the word "cass" tattooed in a handwritten font.

== Charts ==
Chart (2019)	Peak position
Belgium (Ultratip Bubbling Under Flanders)	28
Iceland (Tónlistinn)	23
US Hot Rock & Alternative Songs (Billboard)	45

== Certifications ==
Certifications and sales for "Woman"
Region	Certification	Certified units/sales
New Zealand (RMNZ)	Gold	15,000^{‡}
^{‡} Sales+streaming figures based on certification alone.

== Release history ==
Region	Date	Format	Label
United Kingdom	10 May 2019	Digital download	Gentlemen of the Road; Island; Glassnote
