= Sigh No More (Mumford & Sons album) =

Studio album by Mumford & Sons
- Released: 2 October 2009
- Recorded: 2008–2009
- Studio: Eastcote Studios, London, UK
- Length: 48:33
- Label: Island; Glassnote
- Producer: Markus Dravs

Mumford & Sons chronology
Love Your Ground (2008)	Sigh No More (2009)	Babel (2012)

Singles from Sigh No More
- 1. "Little Lion Man" Released: 11 August 2009; 2. "Winter Winds" Released: 6 December 2009; 3. "The Cave" Released: 26 February 2010; 4. "Roll Away Your Stone" Released: 3 June 2010

Sigh No More is the debut studio album by British folk rock band Mumford & Sons. It was released on 2 October 2009 in the UK, and on 16 February 2010 in the United States and Canada. The album entered the UK Albums Chart at No. 11 and peaked at No. 2 on 20 February 2011, in its 72nd week on the chart and following its Album of the Year win at the Brit Awards. In early 2011, the album peaked at No. 2 on the Billboard 200 in the US.

In mid-2010, it was rated the year-to-date's 8th best record on NPR's All Songs Considered. On 20 July 2010, it was shortlisted for the Mercury Prize, awarded annually for the best album in the United Kingdom and Ireland. On 6 December 2010, a deluxe edition was released. This included the original album, a live CD of the concert from the O2 Shepherd's Bush Empire, and a DVD containing parts 1, 2 and 3 of the Gentlemen of the Road documentaries. On 15 February 2011, the album was awarded the Best British Album at the BRIT Awards. In the United States, it was the 3rd most digitally downloaded album of 2011, selling 761,000 copies.

== Singles ==
- "Little Lion Man" was released on 11 August 2009 as the first single from the album. The single has managed to reach number 21 in the UK Singles Chart, number 45 in the Billboard Hot 100, number 1 on the Billboard Alternative Songs chart, number 3 in the Australian Singles Chart and No. 1 in Triple J's Hottest 100 (Australia) of 2009.
- "Winter Winds" was released on 6 December 2009 as the second single from the album. The single has managed to reach number 44 in the UK Singles Chart.
- "The Cave" was released on 26 February 2010 as the third single from the album. The single reached number 31 in the UK Singles Chart, number 27 in the Billboard Hot 100, number 3 on the Billboard Alternative Songs chart, number 10 in the Irish Singles Chart and number 17 in the ARIA Chart. It was released as the second American single on 25 October 2010.
- "Roll Away Your Stone" was released on 3 June 2010 as the fourth single from the album. The single peaked at number 141 and number 10 on the Billboard Alternative Songs chart.

== Reception ==
Professional ratings
Aggregate scores
Source	Rating
AnyDecentMusic?	6.1/10
Metacritic	68/100
Review scores
Source	Rating
AllMusic	3/5 stars
Clash	8/10
Consequence of Sound	4/5 stars
The Guardian	3/5 stars
NME	7/10
Pitchfork	2.1/10
Q	4/5 stars
Rolling Stone	3.5/5 stars
Spin	8/10
Uncut	3/5 stars

=== Critical reception ===
Sigh No More received generally positive reviews from music critics. At Metacritic, which assigns a normalized rating out of 100 to reviews from mainstream critics, the album received an average score of 68, based on 18 reviews, which indicates "generally favorable reviews".

=== Commercial performance ===
Sigh No More was a slow burner, reaching number one on the Irish Albums Chart and number two on the UK Albums Chart six months and sixteen months, respectively, after its release.

The album sold over a million copies in the United Kingdom and over three million in the US. In the US, the album sold 626,000 copies in 2010 and 1,282,000 in 2011. As of May 2015, it has sold over 3.2 million copies in the US. It was the second debut album (after The Fame by Lady Gaga) to sell 1 million digital copies with 1,656,000 million copies sold.

== Track listing ==
All tracks are written by Mumford & Sons (Marcus Mumford, Ben Lovett, Winston Marshall, and Ted Dwane).

No.	Title	Length
1.	"Sigh No More"	3:27
2.	"The Cave"	3:37
3.	"Winter Winds"	3:39
4.	"Roll Away Your Stone"	4:23
5.	"White Blank Page"	4:14
6.	"I Gave You All"	4:20
7.	"Little Lion Man"	4:06
8.	"Timshel"	2:53
9.	"Thistle & Weeds"	4:49
10.	"Awake My Soul"	4:15
11.	"Dust Bowl Dance"	4:43
12.	"After the Storm"	4:03

Limited deluxe edition bonus track
No.	Title	Length
13.	"Hold on to What You Believe" (B-side to "Winter Winds")	4:06

Limited deluxe edition bonus disc (live at O2 Shepherd's Bush Empire)
No.	Title	Length
1.	"Sigh No More"	4:11
2.	"Winter Winds"	3:48
3.	"Roll Away Your Stone"	4:26
4.	"White Blank Page"	4:13
5.	"I Gave You All"	4:17
6.	"Awake My Soul"	4:38
7.	"Little Lion Man"	4:16
8.	"Thistle & Weeds"	5:39
9.	"Timshel"	3:22
10.	"The Cave"	4:00
11.	"Dust Bowl Dance"	5:31
12.	"Feel the Tide"	3:41

- Recorded live at Shepherd's Bush Empire on 14 March 2010.

== Personnel ==
=== Mumford & Sons ===
- Marcus Mumford – vocals, guitar, drums, mandolin
- Ben Lovett – vocals, keyboards, organ, accordion
- Winston Marshall (Country Winston) – vocals, banjo, electric banjo, electric guitar, bass guitar
- Ted Dwane – vocals, double bass, bass guitar, drums

=== Additional musicians ===
- Nick Etwell – trumpet, flugelhorn
- Pete Beachill – trombone
- Nell Catchpole – violin, viola
- Christopher Allan – cello
- Markus Dravs – production, "a nail and a piano string"
- Tom Hobden – original string parts on track 5

=== Technical ===
- François Chevallier – engineering
- Samuel Navel – assistant engineering
- Ruadhri Cushnan – mixing
- Bob Ludwig – mastering

== Charts ==
=== Weekly charts ===
Chart (2009–2012)	Peak position
Australian Albums (ARIA)	1
Austrian Albums (Ö3 Austria)	26
Belgian Albums (Ultratop Flanders)	3
Canadian Albums (Billboard)	2
Danish Albums (Hitlisten)	20
Dutch Albums (Album Top 100)	3
European Top 100 Albums (Billboard)	8
French Albums (SNEP)	173
German Albums (Offizielle Top 100)	29
Irish Albums (IRMA)	1
New Zealand Albums (RMNZ)	1
Scottish Albums (OCC)	2
Swedish Albums (Sverigetopplistan)	28
Swiss Albums (Schweizer Hitparade)	21
UK Albums (OCC)	2
UK Album Downloads (OCC)	1
US Billboard 200	2
US Americana/Folk Albums (Billboard)	1
US Independent Albums (Billboard)	1
US Top Alternative Albums (Billboard)	1
US Top Rock Albums (Billboard)	1
US Indie Store Album Sales (Billboard)	1

=== Year-end charts ===
Chart (2009)	Position
UK Albums (OCC)	102
Chart (2010)	Rank
Australian Albums (ARIA)	8
Belgian Albums (Ultratop Flanders)	4
Dutch Albums (MegaCharts)	14
European Top 100 Albums (Billboard)	15
Irish Albums (IRMA)	7
New Zealand Albums (RMNZ)	20
UK Albums (OCC)	10
US Billboard 200	83
Chart (2011)	Position
Belgian Albums (Ultratop Flanders)	37
Canadian Albums (Billboard)	7
Dutch Albums (MegaCharts)	38
New Zealand Albums (RMNZ)	5
UK Albums (OCC)	27
US Billboard 200	8
Chart (2012)	Position
Australian Albums (ARIA)	53
Belgian Albums (Ultratop Flanders)	10
Dutch Albums (MegaCharts)	37
New Zealand Albums (RMNZ)	38
UK Albums (OCC)	49
US Billboard 200	29
US Americana/Folk Albums (Billboard)	2
US Independent Albums (Billboard)	3
US Top Alternative Albums (Billboard)	7
US Top Rock Albums (Billboard)	7
US Digital Album Sales (Billboard)	13
Chart (2013)	Position
UK Albums (OCC)	63
US Billboard 200	52
US Americana/Folk Albums (Billboard)	4

=== Decade-end charts ===
Chart (2010–2019)	Position
Australian Albums (ARIA)	29
UK Albums (OCC)	16
US Billboard 200	26

== Certifications and sales ==
Region	Certification	Certified units/sales
Australia (ARIA)	4× Platinum	280,000^{^}
Austria (IFPI Austria)	Platinum	20,000^{*}
Belgium (BRMA)	Platinum	30,000^{*}
Canada (Music Canada)	2× Platinum	395,000
Denmark (IFPI Danmark)	Platinum	20,000^{‡}
Germany (BVMI)	3× Gold	300,000^{‡}
Italy (FIMI)	Gold	25,000^{‡}
Netherlands (NVPI)	Gold	25,000^{^}
New Zealand (RMNZ)	5× Platinum	75,000^{‡}
United Kingdom (BPI)	6× Platinum	1,742,406
United States (RIAA)	3× Platinum	3,000,000^{^}
Summaries
Europe (IFPI)	2× Platinum	2,000,000^{*}
^{*} Sales figures based on certification alone.^{^} Shipments figures based on certification alone.^{‡} Sales+streaming figures based on certification alone.

== Release history ==
Date	Country	Label	Album version
2 October 2009	United Kingdom	Island Records	Standard
6 December 2010	United Kingdom	Island Records	Limited Deluxe
16 February 2010	Canada	Glassnote Records	Standard
16 February 2010	United States	Glassnote Records	Standard
24 October 2011	United States	Glassnote Records	Limited Deluxe
