= The Cave (song) =

2010 single by Mumford & Sons

Single by Mumford & Sons

from the album Sigh No More
- B-side: "Untitled"
- Released: 26 February 2010
- Recorded: 2009
- Genre: Indie folk; folk rock; bluegrass
- Length: 3:37
- Label: Island
- Songwriters: Mumford & Sons
- Producer: Markus Dravs

Mumford & Sons singles chronology
"Winter Winds" (2009)	"The Cave" (2010)	"Roll Away Your Stone" (2010)

"The Cave" is a song by London folk rock quartet Mumford & Sons, from their debut album Sigh No More (2009). It was released in the UK as the third single from the album on 26 February 2010. It placed No. 81 in Triple J's Hottest 100 of 2009 before the single had been released. It was the second single in the US after "Little Lion Man", and had sold 1,657,000 digital copies there by September 2012. The song is accompanied by a guitar tuned to open D (with a capo on fret 2).

== Chart performance ==
"The Cave" first entered the Australian singles chart on 12 February 2010, almost a month before its release. The song peaked at number 31 making it Mumford & Sons' second single to make an impact on the Australian singles chart.

On 19 February 2010 "The Cave" debuted at number 43 on the Irish Singles Chart, making it Mumford & Sons' second single to make an impact on the Irish Chart. The following week the single climbed to No. 29, and on 5 March 2010, "The Cave" reached a new peak of No. 20, beating Little Lion Man's peak placement of No. 21. "The Cave" then debuted in the Irish Top 10 on 26 March 2010 at number 10.

The song was also featured on VH1's top 40 videos of 2011.

"The Cave" first entered the UK Singles Chart on 7 February 2010, at No. 88. The following week, the single climbed eighteen places to No. 70 and then climbed a further 7 to No. 63. The single then climbed to No. 51, and on 7 March 2010, following the physical release of "The Cave", the single climbed to No. 37, making it Mumford & Sons' second Top 40 hit in the UK. The single remained at a fixed position of No. 37 for three weeks. On 28 March 2010, the single climbed five places to No. 32, then reached a peak of number 31.

As of April 2013, the song had sold 1,778,000 copies in the US.

== Use in popular media ==
In May 2012, the song featured on a Lastminute.com advertisement and on the ITV World Cup 2010 coverage in England. It was also featured prominently in the pilot episode of the Fox Network's drama Lone Star. The song also featured on the first episode of the fourth season of the British TV series Skins.

The song is referenced in the song "All My Lows" by British musician Example with the lyric "Lost in a cave like sons of Mumford".

== Award nominations ==
On 30 November 2011, the song received four nominations in the 54th Annual Grammy Awards including for Record of the Year, Song of the Year, Best Rock Performance and Best Rock Song.

Year	Organization	Award	Result
2011	Billboard Music Award	Top Alternative Song	Nominated
2011	MTV Video Music Award	Best Rock Video	Nominated
2012	Grammy Award	Record of the Year	Nominated
2012	Grammy Award	Song of the Year	Nominated
2012	Grammy Award	Best Rock Performance	Nominated
2012	Grammy Award	Best Rock Song	Nominated
2012	Billboard Music Award	Top Alternative Song	Nominated

== Charts ==
=== Weekly charts ===
Chart (2010–11)	Peak position
Australia (ARIA)	32
Belgium (Ultratop 50 Flanders)	21
Belgium (Ultratip Bubbling Under Wallonia)	22
Canada Hot 100 (Billboard)	31
Ireland (IRMA)	10
Japan Hot 100 (Billboard)	83
Netherlands (Single Top 100)	65
New Zealand (Recorded Music NZ)	23
Scotland Singles (Official Charts)	23
UK Singles (Official Charts)	31
US Billboard Hot 100	27
US Adult Alternative Airplay (Billboard)	2
US Adult Pop Airplay (Billboard)	40
US Alternative Airplay (Billboard)	3
US Hot Rock & Alternative Songs (Billboard)	2

=== Year-end charts ===
Chart (2010)	Position
UK Singles (OCC)	121
Chart (2011)	Position
US Hot Rock Songs (Billboard)	6

== Certifications ==
Certifications for "The Cave"
Region	Certification	Certified units/sales
Australia (ARIA)	Platinum	70,000^{^}
Brazil (Pro-Música Brasil)	Gold	30,000^{‡}
Canada (Music Canada)	2× Platinum	160,000^{*}
Denmark (IFPI Danmark)	Gold	45,000^{‡}
Germany (BVMI)	Gold	150,000^{‡}
Italy (FIMI)	Gold	25,000^{‡}
New Zealand (RMNZ)	2× Platinum	60,000^{‡}
United Kingdom (BPI)	2× Platinum	1,200,000^{‡}
United States (RIAA)	2× Platinum	1,778,000
^{*} Sales figures based on certification alone.^{^} Shipments figures based on certification alone.^{‡} Sales+streaming figures based on certification alone.

== Music video ==
The official music video for "The Cave" features each of the four band members driving on scooters through the roads of Goa, India while singing the song in tandem with four Indian men in marching band uniforms to whom they gave their instruments at the start of the video.

== Release history ==
Region	Date	Format	Label
United Kingdom	26 February 2010	Digital download	Island
United Kingdom	2 March 2010	CD single	Island
United States	26 October 2010	Radio	Glassnote
