= The Very Best (band) =

English-Malawian musical project

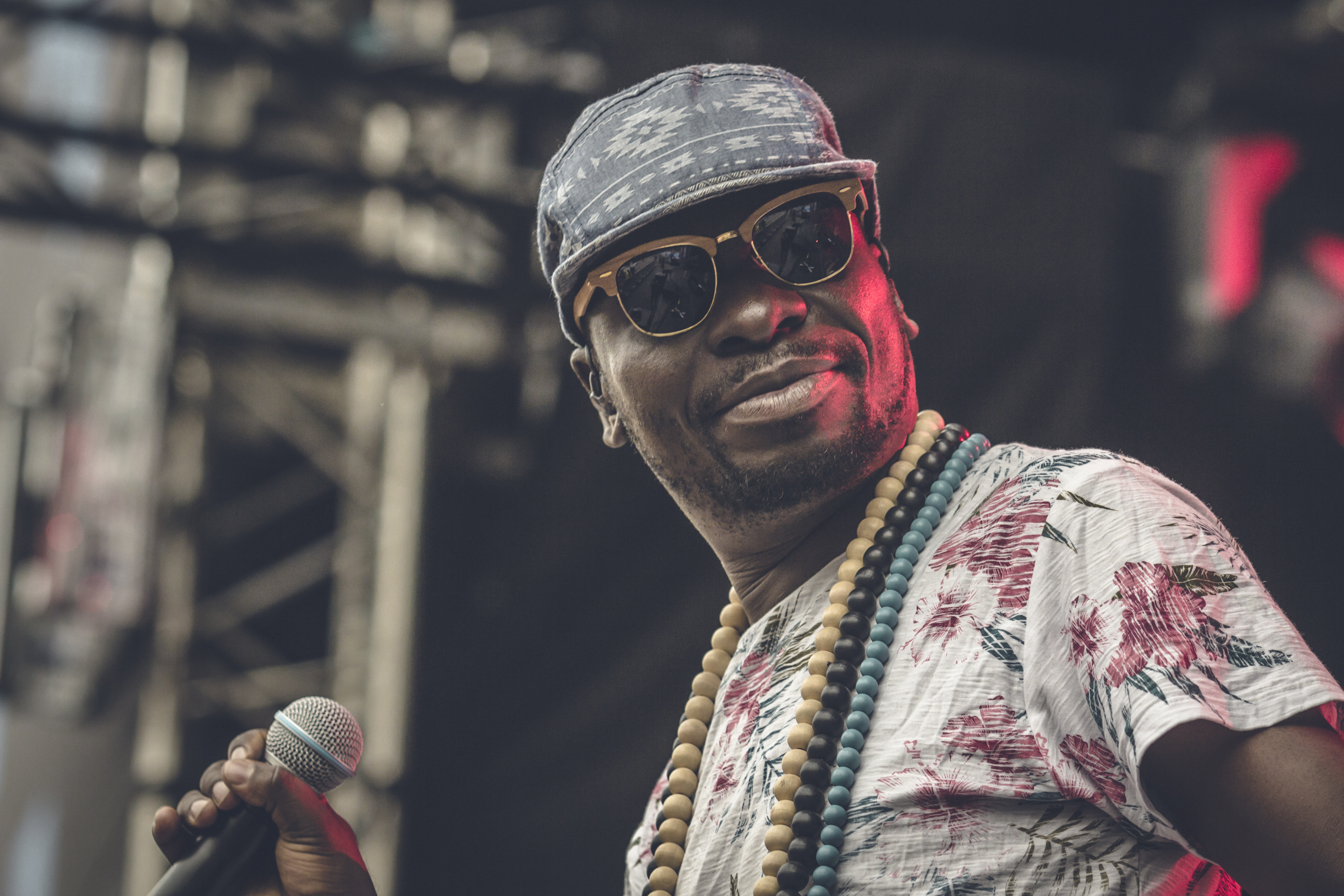

Background information
- Origin: London
- Genres: Jazz; jazz fusion; Afro-Western; dance; hip hop; pop; traditional; Malawian
- Years active: 2008–present
- Members: Esau Mwamwaya; Etienne Tron; Johan Karlberg
- Website: theverybestmusic.com

The Very Best is a collaboration between London-based DJ and production duo Radioclit and Esau Mwamwaya, a singer from Lilongwe, Malawi. Their music has been described as an Afro-Western mix of dance, hip hop, pop, and the traditional music of Malawi.

== History ==
Esau Mwamwaya was born in Mzuzu, Malawi, but grew up in the capital, Lilongwe, where he played drums in various bands. He played with numerous artists, including Masaka Band and Evison Matafale. In 1999 he moved to London and while running a second-hand furniture shop in Clapton, East London, Esau sold a bicycle to the producer from the band Radioclit, Etienne Tron. Radioclit's studio was on the same street as Esau's shop, and eventually, Esau became friends with both Tron and Johan Karlberg aka Radioclit.

In 2008, the three men worked together to create a project known as "The Very Best," releasing a critically lauded free mixtape through the label GREEN OWL. The mixtape features samples and collaborations with other indie artists, including M.I.A., Vampire Weekend, Architecture in Helsinki, BLK JKS, Santigold and The Ruby Suns. The songs are sung in Chichewa, the national language of Malawi.

The Very Best produced their first full-length album, Warm Heart of Africa, released digitally in August 2009 and released physically in October 2009 by GREEN OWL and Moshi Moshi. The album features collaborations with Ezra Koenig and M.I.A. The title track from the album, "Warm Heart of Africa," won the World Beat Song award at the 9th Annual Independent Music Awards; the track includes a sample of the famous 1966 song by Victor Uwaifo, Guitar Boy.

The Very Best is also featured on a track on Crookers' debut album, Tons of Friends.

== Discography ==
- Esau Mwamwaya and Radioclit are the Very Best (2008)
- Warm Heart of Africa (2009)
- Warm Heart of Africa (The Remixes) (2011)
- Super Mom (2011)
- MTMTMK (2012)
- Makes a King (2015)
- "Johannesburg (EP)" (2016)
