= Beloved (Mumford & Sons song) =

Single by Mumford & Sons

from the album Delta
- Released: 22 February 2019
- Recorded: 2017
- Genre: Folk; Americana
- Length: 4:25
- Label: Gentlemen of the Road; Island; Glassnote
- Songwriters: Marcus Mumford; Winston Marshall; Ben Lovett; Ted Dwane
- Producer: Paul Epworth

Mumford & Sons singles chronology
"If I Say" (2018)	"Beloved" (2019)	"Woman" (2019)

"Beloved" is a ballad by British folk rock band Mumford & Sons. It was released as the second single from their fourth studio album, Delta (2018), on 22 February 2019. The song was written by Marcus Mumford, Winston Marshall, Ben Lovett and Ted Dwane.

== Background ==
In a statement talking about the song, Marcus Mumford said, "Everyone knows loss in one way or another. This song is about that. I'd never sat with anyone as they died before, and it had an effect on me. As it does everyone I know who has experienced it. But there's wildness and beauty in it as well, and a deep honoring, that became the beginnings of this song that we worked up called 'Beloved'. I feel determined for people to take whatever they want from it, and not to be emotionally prescriptive."

== Composition ==
A ballad, its sound recalls the band's upbringing in the London underground folk and Americana scene.

== Music video ==
A music video to accompany the release of "Beloved" was first released onto YouTube on 20 March 2019 at a total length of four minutes and fifty-one seconds. The music video was filmed in Port Talbot, Wales and was directed by BAFTA nominated filmmaker Charlotte Regan. The video shows a boy and his mother who break free from a hospital, from which she's been she's been confined to. They wander the city in a dreamlike sequence playing simple games, riding horses and sharing a tender moment together before the mother passes away.

== Track listing ==
Digital download (Album version)
No.	Title	Length
1.	"Beloved"	4:25

Digital download
No.	Title	Length
1.	"Beloved" (Single Version)	3:43
2.	"Beloved" (Acoustic / Recorded at the Church Studios)	4:03

== Charts ==
=== Weekly charts ===
Chart (2018–19)	Peak position
Belgium (Ultratip Bubbling Under Flanders)	32
Belgium (Ultratip Bubbling Under Wallonia)	15
Iceland (Tónlistinn)	12
Ireland (IRMA)	67
Scotland Singles (OCC)	60
Sweden Heatseeker (Sverigetopplistan)	2
Switzerland Airplay (Schweizer Hitparade)	100
UK Singles (OCC)	66
US Hot Rock & Alternative Songs (Billboard)	21

=== Year-end charts ===
Chart (2019)	Position
US Adult Alternative Songs (Billboard)	19
US Alternative Songs (Billboard)	34
US Hot Rock Songs (Billboard)	54
US Rock Airplay Songs (Billboard)	40

== Release history ==
Region	Date	Format	Label
United Kingdom	22 February 2019	Digital download	Gentlemen of the Road; Island; Glassnote
