= Little Lion Man =

2009 single by Mumford & Sons

Single by Mumford & Sons

from the album Sigh No More
- B-side: "To Darkness"
- Released: 11 August 2009
- Recorded: 2009
- Genre: Indie folk; folk rock; bluegrass; alternative rock
- Length: 4:06 (album version); 3:30 (radio edit)
- Label: Island; Glassnote
- Songwriters: Mumford & Sons
- Producer: Markus Dravs

Mumford & Sons singles chronology
"Little Lion Man" (2009)	"Winter Winds" (2009)

"Little Lion Man" is the debut single by English folk rock band Mumford & Sons. It was released as the lead single from their debut studio album, Sigh No More, on 11 August 2009 in the United Kingdom. The song had a positive commercial performance, charting in several countries and peaking within the top 20 in Australia, Belgium (Flanders), Ireland, and New Zealand.

== Composition ==
Frontman Marcus Mumford has said about the song:

It's a very personal story, so I won't elaborate upon too much. Suffice to say, it was a situation in my life I wasn't very happy with or proud of... and sometimes when you can't describe a feeling with your own words, it's almost easier to express in a song. And then, when you get asked about the songs, it's quite difficult to explain. It's a conundrum – you don't want to seem self-indulgent explaining yourself; it's always awkward. Which is weird again, because it's never awkward actually singing them. I suppose the song should stand on its own and people draw their own interpretation from the words. But for me, personally, it's the lyrics that I listen to again and again in a song. I place specific importance on them. I can't write lyrics unless I really feel them and mean them, which can sometimes be quite frustrating – because if you're not feeling much at the time, you're stuck.

I guess the sound of it grabs you a little bit by the balls – it's quite an aggressive song, a bit more of a punch in the face. Or at least, for our stuff, anyway – a lot of our stuff isn't quite as hard-hitting as that. It felt like the right song to be the single because it represented the harder, darker side of what we do, and at the same time, the more folksy and punchy side.

== Commercial performance ==
"Little Lion Man" debuted on the UK Singles Chart on 20 September 2009 at number 72. The following week the single climbed eleven places to number 61. On 4 October 2009, the single climbed to number 47, before climbing into the Top 40 at a peak of number 24 on its fourth week in the chart. The single fell ten places to number 34 before falling to number 47 on 25 October 2009, meaning it only spent two weeks within the Top 40. The song found its biggest success in Australia, debuting at number 23 in October before eventually reaching a peak of number 3 in February 2010.

In the US, "Little Lion Man" entered the Billboard Hot 100 chart dated 28 August 2010, when it debuted at No. 98. It reached No. 61 but re-entered at No. 45 after a performance at the Grammys. It has sold 2,336,000 digital copies there as of April 2013.

== Awards ==
The single was ranked first in the Triple J Hottest 100 of 2009, an annual music poll run by Australian national radio station Triple J and described as the largest in the world. It would be the last song released by a British act to top the list until 2020, when Glass Animals won with "Heat Waves".

The song was nominated for Best Rock Song at the 53rd Annual Grammy Awards.

In October 2011, NME placed it at number 43 on its list "150 Best Tracks of the Past 15 Years".

Year	Organization	Award	Result
2010	MTV Video Music Award	Best Cinematography	Nominated
2011	Grammy Award	Best Rock Song	Nominated
2011	Billboard Music Award	Top Alternative Song	Nominated
2011	Billboard Music Award	Top Rock Song	Nominated

== Track listing ==
- CD single

No.	Title	Length
1.	"Little Lion Man"	4:06
2.	"To Darkness"	4:42

== Charts ==
=== Weekly charts ===
Chart (2009–11)	Peak position
Australia (ARIA)	3
Austria (Ö3 Austria Top 40)	70
Belgium (Ultratop 50 Flanders)	4
Belgium (Ultratop 50 Wallonia)	39
Canada Hot 100 (Billboard)	59
Ireland (IRMA)	19
Netherlands (Single Top 100)	41
New Zealand (Recorded Music NZ)	9
Scotland Singles (Official Charts)	23
UK Singles (Official Charts)	24
US Billboard Hot 100	45
US Adult Alternative Airplay (Billboard)	2
US Adult Pop Airplay (Billboard)	16
US Alternative Airplay (Billboard)	1
US Hot Rock & Alternative Songs (Billboard)	3

=== Year-end charts ===
Chart (2009)	Position
Belgium (Ultratop Flanders)	81

Chart (2010)	Position
Australia (ARIA)	46
Belgium (Ultratop Flanders)	46
UK Singles (Official Charts Company	173
US Hot Rock Songs (Billboard)	27

Chart (2011)	Position
US Hot Rock Songs (Billboard)	13

=== Decade-end charts ===
Chart (2010–2019)	Position
US Hot Rock Songs (Billboard)	45

== Certifications ==
Certifications for "Little Lion Man"
Region	Certification	Certified units/sales
Australia (ARIA)	4× Platinum	280,000^{^}
Belgium (BRMA)	Gold	15,000^{*}
Brazil (Pro-Música Brasil)	Gold	30,000^{‡}
Canada (Music Canada)	2× Platinum	160,000^{*}
Denmark (IFPI Danmark)	Platinum	90,000^{‡}
Germany (BVMI)	Gold	150,000^{‡}
Italy (FIMI)	Gold	25,000^{‡}
New Zealand (RMNZ)	5× Platinum	150,000^{‡}
Spain (Promusicae)	Gold	30,000^{‡}
United Kingdom (BPI)	4× Platinum	2,400,000^{‡}
United States (RIAA)	2× Platinum	2,336,000
^{*} Sales figures based on certification alone.^{^} Shipments figures based on certification alone.^{‡} Sales+streaming figures based on certification alone.

== See also ==
- List of number-one alternative rock singles of 2010 (U.S.)
