= London Grammar discography =

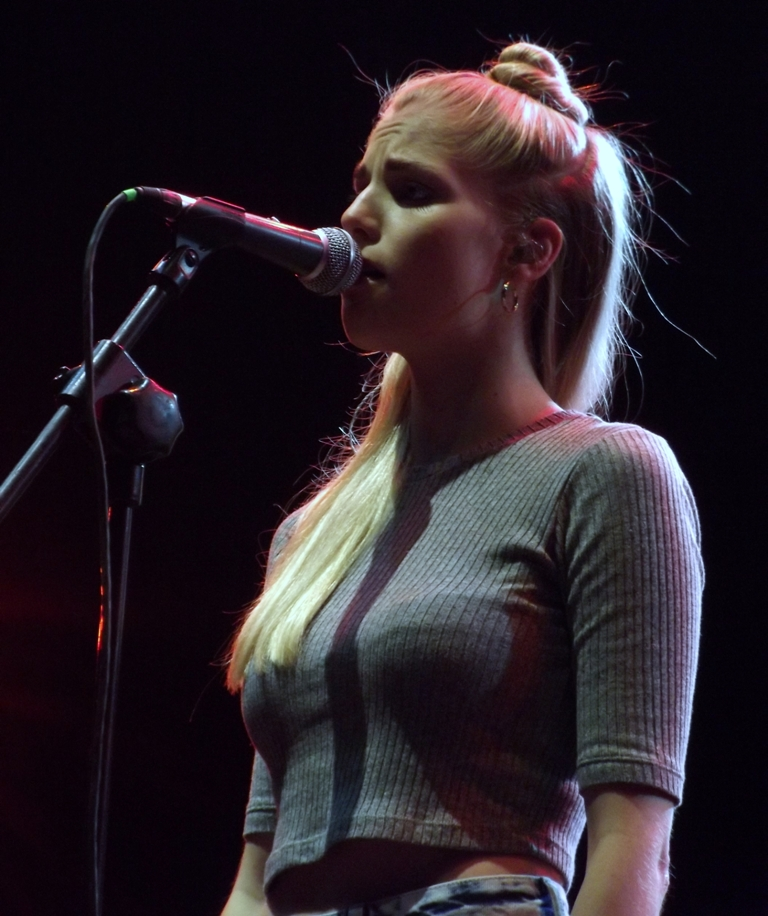
- Hannah Reid of London Grammar performing in August 2013
- Studio albums: 4
- EPs: 1
- Singles: 22
- Music videos: 18
- Remix albums: 1

English indie pop trio London Grammar has released four studio albums, one remix album, one extended play, 22 singles (including two as a featured artist) and 18 music videos. The band was formed in 2012 by Hannah Reid, Dan Rothman and Dominic "Dot" Major. After independently releasing their debut EP Metal & Dust in February 2013, London Grammar signed a contract with record label Ministry of Sound.

London Grammar's debut studio album, If You Wait, was released in September 2013. It reached number two on the UK Albums Chart and was certified platinum by the British Phonographic Industry (BPI). Six singles, "Metal & Dust", "Wasting My Young Years", "Strong", "Nightcall", "Hey Now" and "Sights", were released from the album. "Strong" peaked at number four on the Australian Singles Chart and was certified double platinum, while "Wasting My Young Years" reached number two on the French Singles Chart. At this time, the group collaborated with electronic music duo Disclosure on the single "Help Me Lose My Mind", which reached number 56 on the UK Singles Chart.

== Studio albums ==
List of studio albums, with selected chart positions and certifications
Title	Details	Peak chart positions										Certifications
Title	Details	UK	AUS	BEL (FL)	BEL (WA)	FRA	GER	IRE	NL	SWI	US	Certifications
If You Wait	Released: 6 September 2013; Labels: Metal & Dust, Ministry of Sound; Formats: CD, LP, digital download, streaming	2	2	9	3	6	34	9	11	8	91	BPI: 2× Platinum; ARIA: Platinum; BEA: Platinum; BVMI: Gold
Truth Is a Beautiful Thing	Released: 9 June 2017; Labels: Metal & Dust, Ministry of Sound; Formats: CD, LP, digital download, streaming	1	3	2	1	2	9	3	9	4	129	BPI: Gold; BEA: Gold; SNEP: Gold
Californian Soil	Released: 16 April 2021; Labels: Metal & Dust, Ministry of Sound; Formats: CD, LP, digital download, streaming	1	1	4	3	3	10	2	4	1	— (Note: Californian Soil did not enter the Billboard 200, but peaked at number 50 on the Top Current Album Sales chart.)	BPI: Gold
The Greatest Love	Released: 13 September 2024; Labels: Metal & Dust, Ministry of Sound; Formats: CD, LP, digital download, streaming	3	79	7	6	21	9	40	15	4	—	
"—" denotes a recording that did not chart or was not released in that territory.

== Remix albums ==
List of remix albums, with selected chart positions
Title	Details	Peak chart positions	
Title	Details	UK Down.	UK Sales
The Remixes	Released: 21 July 2023; Label: Ministry of Sound; Formats: Digital download, streaming	5	45

== Extended plays ==
List of extended plays, with selected chart positions
Title	Details	Peak chart positions
Title	Details	AUS
Metal & Dust	Released: 25 February 2013; Label: Metal & Dust; Formats: LP, digital download, streaming	68

== Singles ==
=== As lead artist ===
List of singles as lead artist, with selected chart positions and certifications, showing year released and album name
Title	Year	Peak chart positions										Certifications	Album
Title	Year	UK	AUS	BEL (FL)	BEL (WA)	FRA	GER	IRE	NZ	SCO	SWI	Certifications	Album
"Metal & Dust"	2013	105	—	—	—	—	—	—	—	—	—		If You Wait
"Wasting My Young Years"	2013	31	62	23	4	2	—	—	—	34	11	BPI: Gold; RMNZ: Gold	If You Wait
"Strong"	2013	16	4	4	6	60	28	20	11	16	32	BPI: Platinum; ARIA: 2× Platinum; BEA: Gold; BVMI: Platinum; RMNZ: 2× Platinum	If You Wait
"Nightcall"	2013	53	—	36	—	59	—	—	—	—	—	BPI: Silver	If You Wait
"Hey Now"	2014	37	—	— (Note: "Hey Now" did not enter the Flemish Ultratop chart, but peaked at number five on the Ultratip chart.)	— (Note: "Hey Now" did not enter the Walloon Ultratop chart, but peaked at number 19 on the Ultratip chart.)	45	—	—	—	37	—	BPI: Platinum; RMNZ: Platinum	If You Wait
"Sights"	2014	— (Note: "Sights" did not enter the UK Singles Chart, but peaked at number 50 on the UK Physical Singles Chart and at number 36 on the UK Vinyl Singles Chart.)	—	—	—	—	—	—	—	—	—		If You Wait
"If You Wait"	2014	— (Note: "If You Wait" did not enter the UK Singles Chart, but peaked at number 17 on the UK Independent Singles Chart.)	—	—	—	—	—	—	—	—	—		If You Wait
"Rooting for You"	2017	58	—	— (Note: "Rooting for You" did not enter the Flemish Ultratop chart, but peaked at number 13 on the Ultratip chart.)	— (Note: "Rooting for You" did not enter the Walloon Ultratop chart, but peaked at number 43 on the Ultratip chart.)	55	—	72	—	45	—	BPI: Silver	Truth Is a Beautiful Thing
"Big Picture"	2017	73	—	— (Note: "Big Picture" did not enter the Flemish Ultratop chart, but peaked at number 16 on the Ultratip chart.)	—	31	—	—	—	36	—	BPI: Silver	Truth Is a Beautiful Thing
"Truth Is a Beautiful Thing"	2017	— (Note: "Truth Is a Beautiful Thing" did not enter the UK Singles Chart, but peaked at number 45 on both the UK Singles Sales Chart and the UK Singles Downloads Chart.)	—	—	—	40	—	—	—	55	—		Truth Is a Beautiful Thing
"Oh Woman Oh Man"	2017	85	—	— (Note: "Oh Woman Oh Man" did not enter the Flemish Ultratop chart, but peaked at number six on the Ultratip chart.)	—	96	—	—	—	51	—	BPI: Silver	Truth Is a Beautiful Thing
"Non Believer"	2017	—	—	— (Note: "Non Believer" did not enter the Flemish Ultratop chart, but peaked at number 17 on the Ultratip chart.)	—	—	—	—	—	—	—		Truth Is a Beautiful Thing
"Hell to the Liars"	2017	— (Note: "Hell to the Liars" did not enter the UK Singles Chart, but peaked at number 100 on the UK Singles Downloads Chart.)	—	—	—	—	—	—	—	—	—		Truth Is a Beautiful Thing
"Baby It's You"	2020	80	—	— (Note: "Baby It's You" did not enter the Flemish Ultratop chart, but peaked at number nine on the Ultratip chart.)	— (Note: "Baby It's You" did not enter the Walloon Ultratop chart, but peaked at number 41 on the Ultratip chart.)	—	—	—	—	—	—	BPI: Silver	Californian Soil
"Californian Soil"	2020	— (Note: "Californian Soil" did not enter the UK Singles Chart, but peaked at number 53 on the UK Singles Sales Chart and at number 47 on the UK Singles Downloads Chart.)	—	—	—	—	—	—	—	—	—		Californian Soil
"Lose Your Head"	2021	— (Note: "Lose Your Head" did not enter the UK Singles Chart, but peaked at number 26 on the UK Singles Sales Chart and at number 24 on the UK Singles Downloads Chart.)	—	—	—	—	—	—	— (Note: "Lose Your Head" did not enter the NZ Top 40 Singles Chart, but peaked at number 28 on the NZ Hot Singles Chart.)	—	—		Californian Soil
"How Does It Feel"	2021	67	—	— (Note: "How Does It Feel" did not enter the Flemish Ultratop chart, but peaked at number eight on the Ultratip chart.)	38	—	—	—	— (Note: "How Does It Feel" did not enter the NZ Top 40 Singles Chart, but peaked at number 31 on the NZ Hot Singles Chart.)	—	—	BPI: Silver	Californian Soil
"Lord It's a Feeling"	2021	— (Note: "Lord It's a Feeling" did not enter the UK Singles Chart, but peaked at number 46 on the UK Singles Sales Chart and at number 45 on the UK Singles Downloads Chart.)	—	—	—	—	—	—	— (Note: "Lord It's a Feeling" (High Contrast Remix) did not enter the NZ Top 40 Singles Chart, but peaked at number 32 on the NZ Hot Singles Chart.)	—	—		Californian Soil
"Dancing by Night" (with Sebastian)	2023	—	—	—	—	—	—	—	—	—	—		The Remixes
"Higher" (with CamelPhat)	2023	—	—	—	—	—	—	—	—	—	—		The Remixes
"House"	2024	— (Note: "House" did not enter the UK Singles Chart but peaked at number 36 on the UK Singles Downloads Chart.)	—	—	—	—	—	—	—	—	—		The Greatest Love
"Kind of Man"	2024	—	—	—	—	—	—	—	— (Note: "Kind of Man" did not enter the NZ Top 40 Singles Chart, but peaked at number 37 on the NZ Hot Singles Chart.)	—	—		The Greatest Love
"Into Gold"	2024	—	—	—	—	—	—	—	—	—	—		The Greatest Love
"—" denotes a recording that did not chart or was not released in that territory.

=== As featured artist ===
List of singles as featured artist, with selected chart positions, showing year released and album name
Title	Year	Peak chart positions							Certifications	Album
Title	Year	UK	UK Dance	AUS	BEL (FL) Tip	IRE	SCO	US Dance/ Elec.	Certifications	Album
"Help Me Lose My Mind" (Disclosure featuring London Grammar)	2013	56	10	—	27	97	72	45	BPI: Gold; RMNZ: Platinum	Settle
"Let You Know" (Flume featuring London Grammar)	2019	—	—	31	9	—	—	20	RMNZ: Gold	Non-album single
"—" denotes a recording that did not chart or was not released in that territory.

== Other charted songs ==
List of other charted songs, with selected chart positions, showing year released and album name
Title	Year	Peak chart positions		Album
Title	Year	UK Indie	NZ Hot	Album
"Interlude"	2013	25	—	If You Wait
"Missing"	2021	—	27	Californian Soil
"Lord It's a Feeling"	2021	—	14	Californian Soil
"You and I"	2024	—	31	The Greatest Love
"—" denotes a recording that did not chart or was not released in that territory.

== Other appearances ==
List of non-single appearances, showing year released and album name
Title	Year	Album
"Wicked Game"	2014	BBC Radio 2: Sounds of the '80s – Unique Covers of Classic Hits

== Music videos ==
List of music videos, showing year released and director
Title	Year	Director	Ref.
"Wasting My Young Years"	2013	Bison	
"Strong"	2013	Sam Brown	
"Nightcall"	2013	André Chocron	
"Hey Now"	2014	Chris Ullens	
"Sights"	2014	Giorgio Testi	
"Rooting for You"	2016	Bison	
"Big Picture"	2017	Sophie Muller	
"Oh Woman"	2017	Tony Kaye	
"Oh Man"	2017	Tony Kaye	
"Non Believer"	2017	Jodeb	
"Californian Soil"	2020	Silent Tapes	
"Lose Your Head"	2021	Zhang + Knight	
"How Does It Feel"	2021	Dave Bullivant	
"Lord It's a Feeling"	2021	Dave Bullivant	
"America"	2021	Dave Bullivant	
"Dancing by Night" (with Sebastian)	2023	Jeanne Lula Chauveau	
"Higher" (with CamelPhat)	2023	Waxxwork	
"House"	2024	Waxxwork	
