= Settle: The Remixes =

Remix album by Disclosure
- Released: 17 December 2013
- Recorded: 2012–13
- Genres: House; deep house; UK garage; trap; grime; R&B
- Length: 77:46
- Labels: PMR; Island
- Producer: Disclosure

Disclosure chronology
| Settle (2013) | Settle: The Remixes (2013) | Caracal (2015) |

Singles from Settle: The Remixes
- 1. "Together" Released: 25 November 2013

Settle: The Remixes is a remix album by the English electronic music duo Disclosure. The album predominantly features remixes of tracks from their debut studio album, Settle. It also includes the Sam Smith, Nile Rodgers and Jimmy Napes collaboration, "Together", released on 25 November 2013 as a single, and the track, "Apollo", which featured uncredited vocals by Natalie Duncan. It was released on 17 December 2013 in the United States.

The UK edition, titled Settle (Special Edition), combines the remix album with the deluxe edition of Settle and also includes three remixes from the Control EP. The special edition was released on 16 December 2013, by Island Records. Eventually, the Mary J. Blige remix of "F for You" was also added after being re-released on 5 March 2014.

== Track listing ==
Settle (The Remixes)
| No. | Title | Length |
|---|---|---|
| 1. | "Apollo" | 6:44 |
| 2. | "January" (featuring Jamie Woon) (Kaytranada edition) | 5:21 |
| 3. | "Latch" (featuring Sam Smith) (DJ Premier remix) | 3:26 |
| 4. | "Latch" (featuring Sam Smith) (T. Williams club remix) | 4:07 |
| 5. | "Voices" (featuring Sasha Keable) (Wookie remix) | 5:33 |
| 6. | "When a Fire Starts to Burn" (Midland remix) | 5:08 |
| 7. | "White Noise" (featuring AlunaGeorge) (HudMo remix) | 4:30 |
| 8. | "You & Me" (featuring Eliza Doolittle) (Flume remix) | 4:42 |
| 9. | "You & Me" (featuring Eliza Doolittle) (Baauer remix) | 4:02 |
| 10. | "F for You" (TEED remix) | 5:54 |
| 11. | "Help Me Lose My Mind" (featuring London Grammar) (Paul Woolford remix) | 7:08 |
| 12. | "Help Me Lose My Mind" (featuring London Grammar) (Larry Heard remix) | 8:38 |
| 13. | "Help Me Lose My Mind" (featuring London Grammar) (SOHN remix) | 5:11 |
| 14. | "Stimulation" (Preditah remix) | 5:00 |
| 15. | "Together" (with Sam Smith, Nile Rodgers and Jimmy Napes) | 2:22 |

Settle (Special Edition)
| No. | Title | Length |
|---|---|---|
| 1. | "Intro" | 1:00 |
| 2. | "When a Fire Starts to Burn" | 4:43 |
| 3. | "Latch" (featuring Sam Smith) | 4:16 |
| 4. | "F for You" | 4:29 |
| 5. | "White Noise" (featuring AlunaGeorge) | 4:38 |
| 6. | "Defeated No More" (featuring Ed Macfarlane) | 6:09 |
| 7. | "Stimulation" | 5:22 |
| 8. | "Voices" (featuring Sasha Keable) | 4:05 |
| 9. | "Second Chance" | 2:22 |
| 10. | "Grab Her!" | 5:15 |
| 11. | "You & Me" (featuring Eliza Doolittle) | 4:29 |
| 12. | "January" (featuring Jamie Woon) | 5:55 |
| 13. | "Confess to Me" (featuring Jessie Ware) | 4:11 |
| 14. | "Help Me Lose My Mind" (featuring London Grammar) | 4:06 |
| 15. | "Boiling" (featuring Sinéad Harnett) | 3:48 |
| 16. | "What's in Your Head" | 5:31 |
| 17. | "Tenderly" | 5:04 |
| 18. | "Running" (Disclosure remix) (by Jessie Ware) | 5:30 |
| 19. | "Apollo" | 6:44 |
| 20. | "Boiling" (featuring Sinéad Harnett) (Dixon rework) | 6:04 |
| 21. | "Boiling" (featuring Sinéad Harnett) (Medlar remix) | 5:13 |
| 22. | "Control" (featuring Ria Ritchie) (Joe Goddard remix) | 6:35 |
| 23. | "F for You" (TEED remix) | 5:54 |
| 24. | "Help Me Lose My Mind" (featuring London Grammar) (Paul Woolford remix) | 7:08 |
| 25. | "Help Me Lose My Mind" (featuring London Grammar) (Larry Heard remix) | 8:38 |
| 26. | "Help Me Lose My Mind" (featuring London Grammar) (SOHN remix) | 5:11 |
| 27. | "January" (featuring Jamie Woon) (Kaytranada edition) | 5:21 |
| 28. | "Latch" (featuring Sam Smith) (DJ Premier remix) | 3:26 |
| 29. | "Latch" (featuring Sam Smith) (T. Williams club remix) | 4:07 |
| 30. | "Stimulation" (Preditah remix) | 5:00 |
| 31. | "Voices" (featuring Sasha Keable) (Wookie remix) | 5:33 |
| 32. | "When a Fire Starts to Burn" (Midland remix) | 5:08 |
| 33. | "White Noise" (featuring AlunaGeorge) (HudMo remix) | 4:30 |
| 34. | "You & Me" (featuring Eliza Doolittle) (Flume remix) | 4:42 |
| 35. | "You & Me" (featuring Eliza Doolittle) (Baauer remix) | 4:02 |
| 36. | "Together" (with Sam Smith, Nile Rodgers and Jimmy Napes) | 2:22 |
| 37. | "F for You" (featuring Mary J. Blige) (2014 bonus track) | 6:15 |
