= The Greatest Love (album) =

Studio album by London Grammar
- Released: 13 September 2024
- Studio: LG London; RAK; The Rhythm Studio; John Henry's; Studio 13; Church; Narcissus; Dean Street London
- Length: 42:10
- Label: Metal & Dust; Ministry of Sound
- Producer: Tim Bran; George FitzGerald; Jon Hoskins; London Grammar

London Grammar chronology
Californian Soil (2021)	The Greatest Love (2024)

Singles from The Greatest Love
- 1. "House" Released: 5 April 2024; 2. "Kind of Man" Released: 17 May 2024; 3. "Into Gold" Released: 21 June 2024; 4. "Fakest Bitch" Released: 9 August 2024; 5. "You And I" Released: 13 September 2024

The Greatest Love is the fourth studio album by English indie pop band London Grammar. It was released on 13 September 2024 through Metal & Dust and Ministry of Sound.

== Background and singles ==
Arriving over a decade after their debut album If You Wait (2013), The Greatest Love was set to "celebrate a new chapter as they leave their past behind them" with a "newfound sense" of freedom. The album was preceded by four singles: "House" on 5 April, "Kind of Man" on 17 May, "Into Gold" on 21 June 2024 and “Fakest Bitch” on 9 August 2024. A fifth single, “You And I”, was released alongside the launch of the album on 13 September 2024.

== Critical reception ==
Professional ratings
Review scores
Source	Rating
Clash	8/10
Dork	4/5 stars
MusicOMH	3/5 stars

The Greatest Love received generally positive reviews from music critics. Christopher Connor of Clash labelled the project a "finely measured return" in what felt to Connor as a "real statement" from the band with their presentation of a "variety of influences and textures". The author further opined that it contains some of their "best work to date" that rewards new and old listeners alike. Martyn Young at Dork also picks up the inclusion of variety on the record, saying how the "stunning vocals" of Reid find themselves "employed in an ever more rich and dynamic form as she employs different facets of her voice for different moods".

In a more critical review, MusicOMH's John Murphy noted that the band is stuck "very much in a comfort zone" with a sound that "has never really developed over the years", a state that is only elevated by Reid's "impressive vocals". Murphy concluded that The Greatest Love is "exactly" what the listener expects.

== Track listing ==
All tracks are written by Hannah Reid, Daniel Rothman, and Dominic Major, with additional writers noted.

The Greatest Love – Standard edition
No.	Title	Producer(s)	Length
1.	"House"	London Grammar; George FitzGerald^{[a]}; Tim Bran^{[v]}	3:10
2.	"Fakest Bitch"	London Grammar; Bran	4:19
3.	"You and I"	London Grammar; Bran; Jon Hoskins^{[a]}	5:00
4.	"LA"	London Grammar; Bran	4:31
5.	"Ordinary Life"	London Grammar; Bran^{[a]}	3:43
6.	"Santa Fe" (Pablo Bowman)	London Grammar; Bran^{[a]}	3:19
7.	"Kind of Man" (Seth Tackaberry)	London Grammar; Bran; Hoskins	4:15
8.	"Rescue" (FitzGerald)	London Grammar; FitzGerald; Bran^{[v]}	3:55
9.	"Into Gold"	London Grammar	5:42
10.	"The Greatest Love"	London Grammar; Bran^{[a]}	4:16
Total length:			42:10

The Greatest Love – Deluxe edition
No.	Title	Producer(s)	Length
11.	"Players and Losers"	London Grammar	3:53
12.	"Keep On Dreaming" (Pablo Bowman)	London Grammar; Jacana People	3:55
13.	"House (Demo Version)"	London Grammar	3:07
Total length:			53:05

Notes

- ^{^[a]} signifies an additional producer
- ^{^[v]} signifies an additional vocal producer

== Personnel ==
London Grammar

- Dot Major – keyboards (tracks 1, 3, 5–10), vocals (1), drums (3–10)
- Hannah Reid – vocals
- Dan Rothman – guitars (all tracks), keyboards (tracks 1, 3–6, 8–10), vocals (1)

Additional musicians

- Tim Bran – additional programming (tracks 1–5, 7, 8, 10), additional piano (2)
- Seth Tackaberry – bass guitar (tracks 2, 3)
- Sally Herbert – conductor (tracks 3–6, 8, 10)
- Everton Nelson – string leader (3–6, 8, 10)
- The Rhythm Studio Choir – choir vocals (track 3)
- Pablo Bowman – additional vocals (track 6)

Technical

- John Greenham – mastering
- Mark "Spike" Stent – mixing
- Isabel Gracefield – string engineering (tracks 3–6, 8, 10)
- Matt Wiggins – engineering (tracks 5, 10)
- Drew Dungate-Smith – engineering (track 6)
- Liam Hebb – string engineering assistance (tracks 3–6, 8, 10)
- Sally Herbert – string arrangement (tracks 3–6, 8, 10)

Visuals

- Imogen Snell – creative direction
- Riccardo Castano – creative direction
- Alex Bois – design
- Tarek Mawad – photography

== Charts ==
Chart performance for The Greatest Love
Chart (2024)	Peak position
Australian Albums (ARIA)	79
Austrian Albums (Ö3 Austria)	23
Belgian Albums (Ultratop Flanders)	7
Belgian Albums (Ultratop Wallonia)	6
Dutch Albums (Album Top 100)	15
German Albums (Offizielle Top 100)	9
Irish Albums (OCC)	40
Portuguese Albums (AFP)	82
Scottish Albums (OCC)	2
Swiss Albums (Schweizer Hitparade)	4
UK Albums (OCC)	3
