= Rooting for You =

Rooting for You may refer to:

- "Rooting for You" (London Grammar song), 2017
- "Rooting for You" (Alessia Cara song), 2019
