= Settle (album) =

2013 studio album by Disclosure

Studio album by Disclosure
- Released: 3 June 2013
- Recorded: 2011–2013
- Genres: House; dance; EDM; 2-step garage
- Length: 60:37
- Labels: PMR; Island
- Producer: Disclosure

Disclosure chronology
The Singles (2013)	Settle (2013)	Settle: The Remixes (2013)

Singles from Settle
- 1. "Latch" Released: 8 October 2012; 2. "White Noise" Released: 1 February 2013; 3. "You & Me" Released: 28 April 2013; 4. "When a Fire Starts to Burn" Released: 24 May 2013; 5. "F for You" Released: 2 August 2013; 6. "Help Me Lose My Mind" Released: 25 October 2013; 7. "Voices" Released: 13 December 2013

Settle is the debut studio album by English electronic music duo Disclosure, released on June 3, 2013, by PMR Records and Island Records. Accompanied by the success of its lead single, "Latch", featuring Sam Smith, the album features collaborations with AlunaGeorge, Ed Macfarlane of Friendly Fires, Sasha Keable, Eliza Doolittle, Jamie Woon, Jessie Ware, and London Grammar. A deluxe edition of the album contains four bonus tracks, including Disclosure's remix of Ware's song "Running".

Settle received widespread critical praise, and was nominated for the 2013 Mercury Prize. The album debuted at number one on the UK Albums Chart, selling 44,633 copies in its first week. It was certified double platinum by the British Phonographic Industry (BPI) 16 August 2024, denoting shipments in excess of 600,000 copies. In the United States, the album reached number one on the Billboard Dance/Electronic Albums chart with 10,000 units sold after a promotional discount on Google Play Music. It had sold 165,000 copies in the United States by September 2015. A companion remix album, titled Settle: The Remixes, was released in December 2013.

== Singles ==
"Latch" was released as the lead single from the album on 8 October 2012. The song peaked at number 11 on the UK Singles Chart. It also charted in Australia, Belgium, Denmark, Ireland, France, the Netherlands, and the United States.

"White Noise" was released as the second single from the album on 1 February 2013. The song reached number two on the UK Singles Chart, becoming Disclosure's highest-peaking single to date. It also charted in Belgium and Ireland.

"You & Me" was released as the third single from the album on 28 April 2013. The song peaked at number 10 on the UK Singles Chart.

"When a Fire Starts to Burn" was released as the fourth single from the album on 24 May 2013.

"F for You" was released as the fifth single on 2 August 2013. The song charted at number 20 in the UK. The single was re-released on 5 February 2014 with Mary J. Blige providing guest vocals.

"Help Me Lose My Mind" was released as the album's sixth single on 25 October 2013. The song reached number 56 on the UK Singles Chart.

"Voices" was released as the album's seventh and final single on 13 December 2013.

== Critical reception ==
Professional ratings
Aggregate scores
Source	Rating
AnyDecentMusic?	7.3/10
Metacritic	81/100
Review scores
Source	Rating
AllMusic	5/5 stars
The Daily Telegraph	4/5 stars
The Guardian	4/5 stars
Los Angeles Times	3/4 stars
Mixmag	5/5
NME	7/10
Pitchfork	9.1/10
Q	4/5 stars
Rolling Stone	3.5/5 stars
Spin	8/10

Settle received widespread acclaim from music critics. At Metacritic, which assigns a normalised rating out of 100 to reviews from mainstream publications, the album received an average score of 81, based on 31 reviews. Robert Copsey of Digital Spy gave the album a positive review stating: "Despite the list of vocalists reading like a who's who on the Hype Machine chart, Guy and Howard's presence is felt strongly throughout, although the featureless tracks 'Second Chance' and 'Grab Her' are the weaker on the collection. Regardless, much like Daft Punk's latest effort, Settle is an album that brings some sorely needed intelligence back to joyous dance-pop."

Eve Barlow of NME gave the album a positive review stating: "Throughout, Settle will blind you with so much sheen you'll want to tile your bathroom in it. Sadly, the London Grammar-featuring 'Help Me Lose My Mind' is a bit of an unnecessary cool-down. Not to worry, Disclosuremania is clearly about to sweep the nation."

In July 2022, Rolling Stone ranked Settle as the 93rd best debut album of all time.

== Track listing ==
All songs produced by Disclosure.

No.	Title	Writer(s)	Length
1.	"Intro"	Guy Lawrence; Howard Lawrence	1:00
2.	"When a Fire Starts to Burn"	G. Lawrence; H. Lawrence	4:43
3.	"Latch" (featuring Sam Smith)	H. Lawrence; G. Lawrence; Smith; James Napier	4:16
4.	"F for You"	G. Lawrence; H. Lawrence	4:29
5.	"White Noise" (featuring AlunaGeorge)	H. Lawrence; G. Lawrence; Aluna Francis; Napier	4:38
6.	"Defeated No More" (featuring Ed Macfarlane)	G. Lawrence; H. Lawrence; Macfarlane	6:09
7.	"Stimulation"	G. Lawrence; H. Lawrence	5:22
8.	"Voices" (featuring Sasha Keable)	G. Lawrence; H. Lawrence; Napier; Keable	4:05
9.	"Second Chance"	G. Lawrence; H. Lawrence	2:22
10.	"Grab Her!"	G. Lawrence; H. Lawrence	5:15
11.	"You & Me" (featuring Eliza Doolittle)	H. Lawrence; G. Lawrence; Napier; Eliza Caird	4:29
12.	"January" (featuring Jamie Woon)	G. Lawrence; H. Lawrence; Woon	5:55
13.	"Confess to Me" (featuring Jessie Ware)	G. Lawrence; H. Lawrence; Ware	4:11
14.	"Help Me Lose My Mind" (featuring London Grammar)	H. Lawrence; G. Lawrence; Hannah Reid	4:06

Deluxe edition bonus tracks
No.	Title	Writer(s)	Length
15.	"Boiling" (featuring Sinead Harnett)	G. Lawrence; H. Lawrence; Harnett	3:48
16.	"What's in Your Head"	G. Lawrence; H. Lawrence; Harnett	5:31
17.	"Tenderly" (digital only)	G. Lawrence; H. Lawrence	5:04
18.	"Running" (Disclosure remix) (performed by Jessie Ware)	Ware; Julio Bashmore; Brey Baptista	5:30

Japanese edition bonus tracks
No.	Title	Writer(s)	Length
15.	"Boiling" (featuring Sinead Harnett)	G. Lawrence; H. Lawrence; Harnett	3:48
16.	"What's in Your Head"	G. Lawrence; H. Lawrence; Harnett	5:31
17.	"Running" (Disclosure remix) (performed by Jessie Ware)	Ware; Bashmore; Baptista	5:30
18.	"Tenderly"	G. Lawrence; H. Lawrence	5:04

Digital special edition bonus tracks
No.	Title	Writer(s)	Length
19.	"Apollo"	G. Lawrence; H. Lawrence; Natalie Duncan	6:44
20.	"Boiling" (Dixon rework) (featuring Sinead Harnett)	G. Lawrence; H. Lawrence; Harnett	9:31
21.	"Boiling" (Medlar remix) (featuring Sinead Harnett)	G. Lawrence; H. Lawrence; Harnett	5:52
22.	"Control" (Joe Goddard remix) (featuring Ria Ritchie)	G. Lawrence; H. Lawrence; Ritchie	3:58
23.	"F for You" (TEED remix)	G. Lawrence; H. Lawrence	5:54
24.	"Help Me Lose My Mind" (Paul Woolford remix) (featuring London Grammar)	G. Lawrence; H. Lawrence; Reid	7:08
25.	"Help Me Lose My Mind" (Larry Heard remix) (featuring London Grammar)	G. Lawrence; H. Lawrence; Reid	8:38
26.	"Help Me Lose My Mind" (SOHN remix) (featuring London Grammar)	G. Lawrence; H. Lawrence; Reid	5:11
27.	"January" (Kaytranada edition) (featuring Jamie Woon)	G. Lawrence; H. Lawrence; Woon	5:21
28.	"Latch" (DJ Premier remix) (featuring Sam Smith)	G. Lawrence; H. Lawrence; Napier; Smith	3:26
29.	"Latch" (T. Williams club remix) (featuring Sam Smith)	G. Lawrence; H. Lawrence; Napier; Smith	4:07
30.	"Stimulation" (Preditah remix)	G. Lawrence; H. Lawrence	5:00
31.	"Voices" (Wookie remix) (featuring Sasha Keable)	G. Lawrence; H. Lawrence; Napier; Keable	5:33
32.	"When a Fire Starts to Burn" (Midland remix)	G. Lawrence; H. Lawrence	5:08
33.	"White Noise" (HudMo remix) (featuring AlunaGeorge)	G. Lawrence; H. Lawrence; Francis	4:30
34.	"You & Me" (Flume remix) (featuring Eliza Doolittle)	G. Lawrence; H. Lawrence; Napier; Caird	4:42
35.	"You & Me" (Baauer remix) (featuring Eliza Doolittle)	G. Lawrence; H. Lawrence; Napier; Caird	4:02
36.	"Together" (with Sam Smith, Nile Rodgers and Jimmy Napes)	G. Lawrence; H. Lawrence; Smith; Rodgers; Napes	2:22
37.	"F for You" (featuring Mary J. Blige) (2014 bonus track)	G. Lawrence; H. Lawrence; Blige	6:15

US deluxe edition bonus tracks
No.	Title	Writer(s)	Length
15.	"Together" (with Sam Smith, Nile Rodgers and Jimmy Napes)	G. Lawrence; H. Lawrence; Smith; Rodgers; Napes	2:24
16.	"F for You" (featuring Mary J. Blige)	G. Lawrence; H. Lawrence; Blige	6:15

US Target deluxe edition bonus disc
No.	Title	Writer(s)	Length
1.	"Together" (with Sam Smith, Nile Rodgers and Jimmy Napes)	G. Lawrence; H. Lawrence; Smith; Rodgers; Napes	2:24
2.	"F for You" (featuring Mary J. Blige)	G. Lawrence; H. Lawrence; Blige	6:15
3.	"Tenderly"	G. Lawrence; H. Lawrence	5:04
4.	"Apollo"	G. Lawrence; H. Lawrence; Duncan	6:44

Notes

- Settle: The Remixes was released in the United States in place of the special edition.

Sample credits

- "Intro" and "When a Fire Starts to Burn" contain samples of "Rope-a-Dope" by motivational speaker Eric Thomas.
- "Stimulation" contains vocal samples by Lianne La Havas.
- "Second Chance" contains a sample of "Get Along with You" by Kelis.
- "Grab Her!" contains a sample of "Look of Love" by Slum Village.

== Personnel ==
Credits adapted from the liner notes of Settle.

- Disclosure – production, mixing
- Sam Smith – vocals (track 3)
- Howard Lawrence – vocals (tracks 4, 13)
- Aluna Francis – vocals (track 5)
- Ed Macfarlane – vocals (track 6)
- Sasha Keable – vocals (track 8)
- Eliza Doolittle – vocals (track 11)
- Jamie Woon – vocals (track 12)
- Jessie Ware – vocals (track 13)
- Hannah Reid – vocals (track 14)
- Stuart Hawkes – mastering at Metropolis Studios (London)

== Charts ==
=== Weekly charts ===
Weekly chart performance for Settle
Chart (2013–2014)	Peak position
Australian Albums (ARIA)	5
Australian Dance Albums (ARIA)	2
Belgian Albums (Ultratop Flanders)	8
Belgian Albums (Ultratop Wallonia)	76
Danish Albums (Hitlisten)	38
Dutch Albums (Album Top 100)	24
French Albums (SNEP)	89
Irish Albums (IRMA)	10
Japanese Albums (Oricon)	122
New Zealand Albums (RMNZ)	15
Norwegian Albums (VG-lista)	19
Scottish Albums (Official Charts)	5
Swiss Albums (Schweizer Hitparade)	76
UK Albums (Official Charts)	1
UK Dance Albums (Official Charts)	1
US Billboard 200	36
US Top Dance Albums (Billboard)	1

=== Year-end charts ===
2013 year-end chart performance for Settle
Chart (2013)	Position
Belgian Albums (Ultratop Flanders)	135
UK Albums (OCC)	40
US Top Dance/Electronic Albums (Billboard)	20

2014 year-end chart performance for Settle
Chart (2014)	Position
Australian Dance Albums (ARIA)	13
UK Albums (OCC)	55
US Top Dance/Electronic Albums (Billboard)	6

== Certifications ==
Certifications for Settle
Region	Certification	Certified units/sales
Australia (ARIA)	Platinum	70,000^{‡}
Denmark (IFPI Danmark)	Platinum	20,000^{‡}
New Zealand (RMNZ)	2× Platinum	30,000^{‡}
United Kingdom (BPI)	2× Platinum	600,000^{‡}
^{‡} Sales+streaming figures based on certification alone.

== Release history ==
Release dates and formats for Settle
Region	Date	Format	Edition	Label	Ref(s)
Australia	31 May 2013	CD; digital download	Standard; deluxe	Universal	
Australia	31 May 2013	LP	Standard	Universal	
Germany	31 May 2013	CD; digital download	Standard; deluxe	Universal	
Germany	31 May 2013	LP	Standard	Universal	
Ireland	31 May 2013	CD	Standard	PMR; Island	
Ireland	31 May 2013	Digital download	Standard; deluxe	PMR; Island	
United Kingdom	3 June 2013	CD; digital download	Standard; deluxe	PMR; Island	
United Kingdom	3 June 2013	LP	Standard	PMR; Island	
France	3 June 2013	CD	Standard	Barclay	
France	3 June 2013	Digital download	Standard; deluxe	Barclay	
France	10 June 2013	LP	Standard	Barclay	
United States	11 June 2013	CD; digital download	Standard	Cherrytree; Interscope	
United States	25 June 2013	LP	Standard	Cherrytree; Interscope	
Japan	10 July 2013	CD	Japan standard	Universal	
Germany	16 December 2013	Digital download	Special (36 tracks)	Universal	
United Kingdom	16 December 2013	Digital download	Special (36 tracks)	PMR; Island	
France	5 March 2014	Digital download	Special (37 tracks)	Barclay	
Germany	5 March 2014	Digital download	Special (37 tracks)	Universal	
United Kingdom	5 March 2014	Digital download	Special (37 tracks)	PMR; Island	
United States	15 April 2014	CD; digital download	US deluxe	Cherrytree; Interscope	
