= OtherLiine =

Collaborative music project of George FitzGerald and Lil Silva

OtherLiine, stylised as OTHERLiiNE, is the collaborative electronic music project of duo George FitzGerald and Lil Silva (TJ Carter). They released the eponymously titled debut album OtherLiine in 2020 on Ministry of Sound.

== History ==
Prior to collaborating as OtherLiine, FitzGerald and Silva first made contact when Silva asked FitzGerald to remix his track "Lines" (2016). Later they first worked together on the track "Roll Back" for Fitzgerald's album All That Must Be (2018).

== Discography ==
=== Albums ===
- OtherLiine (Ministry of Sound, 2020)

=== Singles ===
- "Chimes" (self-released, 2019)
- "Hates Me" (Ministry of Sound, 2019)

=== Remixes ===
- "Mozambique (feat. Jaykae & Moonchild Sanelly) (OtherLiine Remix)" by Ghetts
