= Baby It's You (London Grammar song) =

2020 single by London Grammar

Single by London Grammar

from the album Californian Soil
- Released: 19 August 2020
- Length: 4:02
- Label: Metal & Dust; Ministry of Sound
- Songwriters: Daniel Rothman; Dominic Major; George FitzGerald; Hannah Reid
- Producers: George Fitzgerald; London Grammar

London Grammar singles chronology
"Let You Know" (2019)	"Baby It's You" (2020)	"Californian Soil" (2020)

"Baby It's You" is a song by English band London Grammar that was released on 19 August 2020 as the lead single from their third studio album Californian Soil (2021).

The song peaked at number 80 on the UK Singles Chart.

== Critical reception ==
Andrew Trendell from NME wrote: "'Baby It's You' carries the trio's familiar atmospherics and some of the more trance-driven elements akin to early single 'Metal & Dust', but also features a new, more colourful Balearic sound and vibe – with the assistance of acclaimed electronic producer George FitzGerald".

== Personnel ==
Credits adapted from Tidal.

London Grammar – producer, associated performer

- Daniel Rothman – composer, lyricist, guitar
- Dominic Major – composer, lyricist, keyboards
- Hannah Reid – composer, lyricist, vocals

Other musicians

- George FitzGerald – producer, composer, lyricist
- Chris Gehringer – mastering engineer
- Nathan Boddy – misc. producer, mixing engineer

== Charts ==
Chart performance for "Baby It's You"
Chart (2020)	Peak position
Belgium (Ultratip Bubbling Under Flanders)	9
Belgium (Ultratip Bubbling Under Wallonia)	31
Scotland Singles (OCC)	28
UK Singles (OCC)	80
US Alternative Digital Song Sales (Billboard)	13
US Rock Digital Song Sales (Billboard)	9

== Certifications ==
Region	Certification	Certified units/sales
United Kingdom (BPI)	Silver	200,000^{‡}
^{‡} Sales+streaming figures based on certification alone.

== Release history ==
Release dates and formats for "Baby It's You"
Region	Date	Format	Label	Ref.
Various	19 August 2020	Digital download; streaming	Metal & Dust; Ministry of Sound	
