= Lil Silva =

- Born: Tyrone Jermaine Carter
- Origin: Bedford, Bedfordshire, England
- Genres: Electronic; Experimental; UK funky
- Occupations: Record producer; singer; songwriter; DJ
- Years active: 2008–present
- Label: Nowhere Music
- Website: soundcloud.com/lilsilva

Tyrone Jermaine "TJ" Carter, better known by the stage name Lil Silva, is an English record producer, singer, songwriter and DJ, based in Bedford. He has produced and sung on his own singles and EPs (mostly released through the Good Years label) that have been described as funky house, UK funky, instrumental grime and "dubstep-inflected pop". He also takes a more traditional producer role on other musicians' work—was principal producer on Banks's album Goddess and contributed production to Adele's album 25. He has collaborated with SBTRKT and on Damon Albarn's Africa Express project.

== Life and career ==
Carter was born and raised in Bedford, England. He produced a CD worth of original material at age nine, began producing at age 10 or 11, and at age 13 was DJing at "Bedford's all-ages club Cabana" whilst also part of local grime crew Macabre Unit. The competition and camaraderie of the Macabre Unit pushed all of its producers to find and develop their own distinct sound. Influenced by what was happening in the music scene overseas in the US, where artists such as Pharrell were starting to create their own distinct 'sounds' in terms of their production styles, Lil Silva thought that there was no reason why the UK grime scene couldn't have its own Pharrell, Timbaland or J Dilla.

As he moved away from grime, Lil Silva began to search for what would become his signature 'Silva Sound'. Some would say this first became actualised on 'Seasons', the upbeat, thumping single from his 2010 EP 'Night Skanker'. This preceded the release of several short bodies of work including five EPs released between 2010 and 2016. His first of what would become many collaborations with Sampha came in 2011 on his EP The Patience, while 2014's Distance features two songs with the British artist BANKS.

In 2015, Lil Silva was called upon by producer Mark Ronson to provide additional production to Adele's song 'Lay Me Down', a bonus track on her album 25. Ronson also called upon him for a session with Lady GaGa around this same time period.

In 2019. Lil Silva joined forces with George Fitzgerald to create a house-leaning project called OTHERLiiNE, and the pair released an album (also called OTHERLiiNE) in 2020.

It was in 2019 when frequent collaborator Kano invited Lil Silva on stage at the Royal Albert Hall to perform with him that he first started considering releasing his own debut album. The lockdowns imposed by the COVID-19 pandemic expedited the quiet time he would need to create solo music for himself, and also offered a reprise from life as a touring DJ and in-demand producer.

Lil Silva's debut album Yesterday Is Heavy was released on 15 July 2022. It features frequent collaborator Sampha, as well as Little Dragon, Ghetts, Serpentwithfeet, BADBADNOTGOOD, Charlotte Day Wilson, Skiifall and Elmiene. The album received a 5 star review from NME, a 9/10 review from Clash. and a score of 9 from The Line Of Best Fit. Pitchfork said of the album "consider this album an extension of UK club's instinctual soul".

Fellow British DJ Harry Eagle adopted the stage name Silva Bumpa in tribute to Silva.

== Discography ==
=== Albums ===
- OtherLiine (Ministry of Sound, 2020) – with George FitzGerald as OtherLiine
- Yesterday is Heavy (Nowhere Music, 2022)

=== Extended plays ===
- Night Skanker (Night Slugs, 2010) – 6 track EP
- The Patience (Good Years, 2011) – 4 track EP – "On Your Own" features Sampha on vocals
- Lil Silva: Club Constructions Vol. 2 (Night Slugs, 2012) – Night Slugs' Club Constructions series, 3 tracks
- Distance (Good Years, 2013) – 4 track EP; "No Doubt" features Rosie Lowe and "Salient Sarah" features Sampha
- Mabel (Good Years, 2014) – 5 track EP, two tracks feature Banks
- Drumatic (Good Years, 2015) – 3 tracks
- Jimi (Good Years, 2016) – 6 track EP

=== Singles ===
Title	Year	Album	Ref.
"Seasons" / "Funky Flex"	2008	Non-album singles	
"Funky Pulse"	2009	Non-album singles	
"Funky Flex vs Pulse"	2010	Non-album singles	
"The Split" / "Venture"	2013	Non-album singles	
"Bouramsy"	2013	Africa Express Presents: Maison Des Jeunes	
"Lines"	2016	Jimi	
"Lines" (George Fitzgerald Remix)	2016	Jimi	
"Caught Up"	2016	Jimi	
"De Ja"	2016	Jimi	
"V1" / "Cyrup"	2016	Non-album singles	
"Making Sense"	2018	Non-album singles	
"Always Wonder"(featuring Cautious Clay)	2018	Non-album singles	
"Chimes - Radio Edit" / "Chimes"	2019	OtherLiine (as OtherLiine)	
"Hates Me"	2019	OtherLiine (as OtherLiine)	
"Hates Me" (Jacques Greene Remix)	2019	OtherLiine (as OtherLiine)	
"Backwards" (featuring Sampha)	2022	Yesterday is Heavy	
"Another Sketch"	2022	Yesterday is Heavy	
"What If" (featuring Skiifall)	2022	Yesterday is Heavy	
"Leave It" (featuring Charlotte Day Wilson)	2022	Yesterday is Heavy	
"To the Floor" (featuring BadBadNotGood)	2022	Yesterday is Heavy	

=== As featured artist ===
- "Roll Back" – All That Must Be (2018) by George FitzGerald
- "Got My Brandy, Got My Beats" – Hoodies All Summer (2019) by Kano
- "Fall Again" (feat. Lil Silva & Melanie Faye) – Help (2020) by Duval Timothy
- "OBX" (feat. Lil Silva) & "Love Galaxy" (feat. Jay Electronica & Lil Silva) – Voyager (2020) by Paul Epworth

== Production discography ==
- Goddess (2014) by Banks
- 25 (2015) by Adele (additional production with Mark Ronson)
- Darth Vader (2018) by Chip (co-production with Sampha)
- Fellowship (2021) by Serpentwithfeet (co-production with Sampha and Serpentwithfeet)

Remixes

- "In Common - Lil Silva Remix" – In Common (The Remixes) (2016) by Alicia Keys
- Love Galaxy Remixes (2020) by Paul Epworth with Lil Silva and Jay Electronica – EP
- "Rush - Lil Silva Remix" – New Me, Same Us Remix EP (2021) by Little Dragon
