= Big Picture (London Grammar song) =

Single by London Grammar

from the album Truth Is a Beautiful Thing
- Released: 1 February 2017
- Recorded: 2014/16
- Genre: Dream pop
- Length: 4:41
- Label: Metal & Dust; Ministry of Sound
- Songwriter(s): Hannah Reid; Daniel Rothman; Dominic Major
- Producer(s): London Grammar; Jon Hopkins

London Grammar singles chronology
"Rooting for You" (2017)	"Big Picture" (2017)	"Truth Is a Beautiful Thing" (2017)

"Big Picture" is a song performed by English trio London Grammar. The song was released in the United Kingdom as a digital download on 1 February 2017 as the second single from their second studio album Truth Is a Beautiful Thing (2017). The song peaked at number 73 on the UK Singles Chart.

== Music video ==
A music video to accompany the release of "Big Picture" was first released onto YouTube on 1 February 2017 at a total length of four minutes and forty seconds.

== Track listing ==
Digital download
No.	Title	Length
1.	"Big Picture"	4:41

== Charts ==
Chart (2017)	Peak position
Belgium (Ultratip Bubbling Under Flanders)	16
France (SNEP)	31
Scotland (OCC)	36
UK Singles (OCC)	73

== Certifications ==
Region	Certification	Certified units/sales
United Kingdom (BPI)	Silver	200,000^{‡}
^{‡} Sales+streaming figures based on certification alone.

== Release history ==
Region	Date	Format	Label
United Kingdom	1 February 2017	Digital download	Metal & Dust; Ministry of Sound
