= Disturbing London =

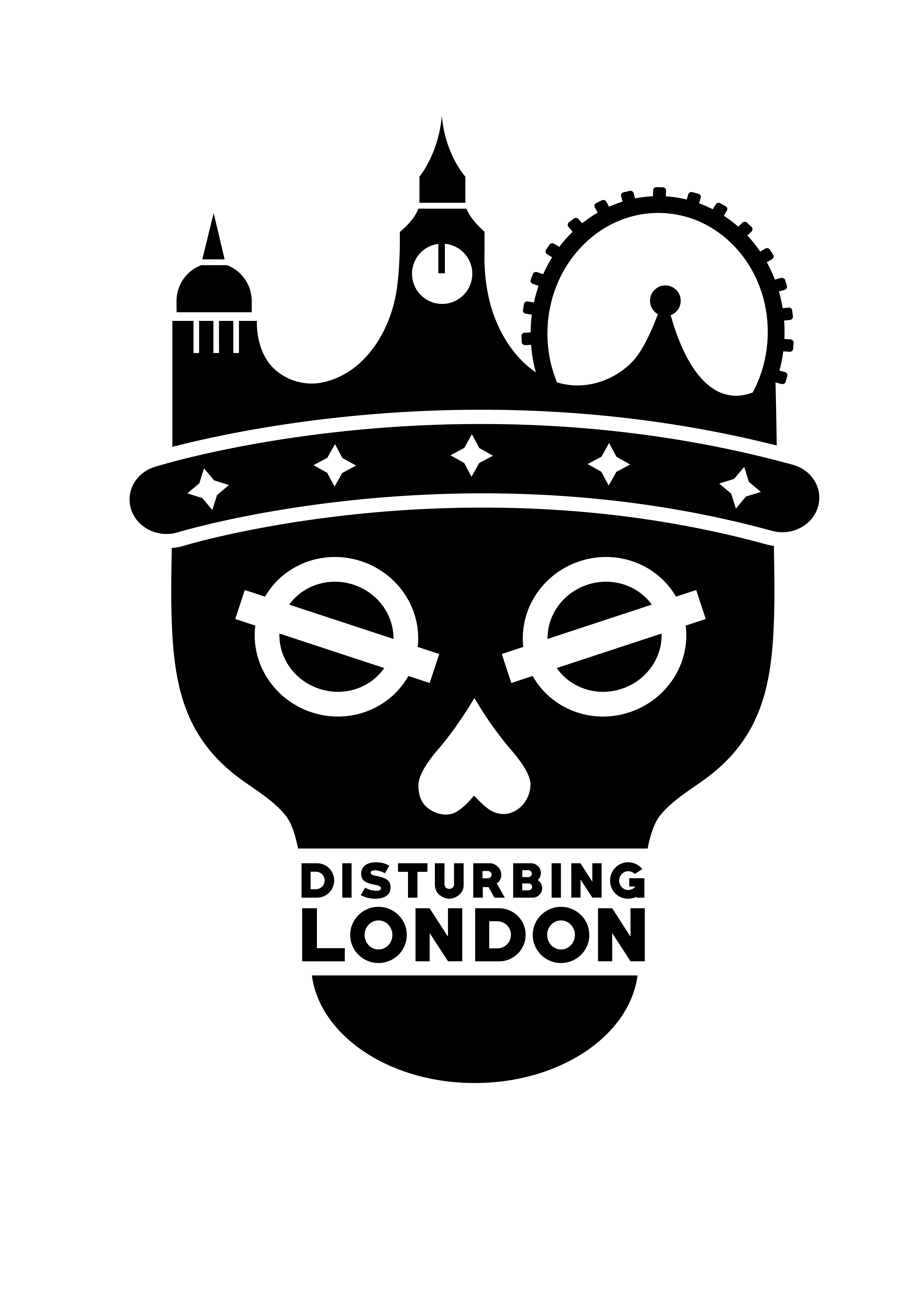
- Founded: 2006; 19 years ago
- Founder: Dumi Oburota; Tinie Tempah
- Genre: Various
- Country of origin: United Kingdom
- Location: London

Disturbing London is an entertainment company founded by cousins Dumi Oburota and Tinie Tempah in 2006. Whilst operating primarily as a record label, the company also has arms in brand consultancy, artist management, event management, music publishing and fashion label. Co-founder Dumi Oburota was included in the 2019 edition of the Powerlist, ranking the 100 most influential Black Britons.

== Joint Venture with Parlophone ==
In May 2018, it was announced that German-British record label Parlophone Records had signed 'an exclusive label partnership with Disturbing London,' with Parlophone co-president Mark Mitchell saying:

'It is a true joint venture, they will remain the A&R, the talent and artist relationship side. We'll amplify their A&R decisions through marketing, international and promotions around the globe.'

== Brand Collaborations ==
=== Nike ===
In July 2012, Disturbing London collaborated with Nike to release a special edition Disturbing London x Nike Blazer Mid LR. Limited to 60 pairs, the shoes were distributed in six different locations across London with both Tinie Tempah and Nike giving out clues for fans to locate the shoes across their Twitter accounts.

=== smart ===
In July 2017, Disturbing London collaborated with SMART to design two limited edition Disturbing London models of the SMART Fortwo, and ForFour designed by Tinie Tempah, Dumi Oburota and Sandy Cheema. The partnership was initiated back in 2015 when Disturbing London curated original social media content called 'smart Disturbs London.'

== Roster ==
=== Current Artists ===
- Tinie Tempah
- Yxng Bane
- Poundz
- DJ Charlesy
- Kida Kudz
- The Indien
- Wavy the Creator
- S1

=== Former Artists ===
- A2
- All About She
- J Warner
- Wizkid
- Sasha Keable
- G FrSh
- Yungen
- Sonny Reeves
- Siobhan Bell
