= George FitzGerald (music producer) =

- Born: George Edmund Benedict FitzGerald
- Origin: Watford, Hertfordshire, England
- Genres: Electronic
- Occupations: DJ, producer
- Years active: 2010–present
- Labels: Double Six, Hotflush, Aus

George FitzGerald is an English electronic musician.

FitzGerald was an employee at the London record store Black Market Records in the mid-2000s, and began issuing records of his own after relocating to Berlin in 2010. He issued singles and EPs on the labels Hotflush, Aus Music, and Hypercolour in the early 2010s and signed with Double Six Recordings in 2013. In 2015, he issued his first album for that label, which included appearances from vocalists Lawrence Hart and Boxed In. His third album, Stellar Drifting, was released on September 2, 2022, on Domino.

OtherLiine is the collaborative music project of FitzGerald and Lil Silva (TJ Carter).

== Discography ==
=== Solo ===
==== Albums ====
- Fading Love (Double Six, 2015)
- All That Must Be (Domino, 2018)
- Stellar Drifting (Domino, 2022)

==== Extended plays ====
- The Let Down (Hotflush, 2010)
- Don't You (Hotflush, 2011)
- Fernweh (Man Make Music, 2011)
- Silhouette (Aus Music, 2012)
- Child (Aus Music, 2012)
- Needs You (Hypercolour, 2012)

=== As part of OtherLiine with Lil Silva ===
==== Albums ====
- OtherLiine (Ministry of Sound, 2020)

==== Singles ====
- "Chimes" (self-released, 2019)
- "Hates Me" (Ministry of Sound, 2019)

=== Production discography ===
Lists of songs produced, with year released, lead artist(s) and album name shown
Title	Year	Artist(s)	Album
"Baby It's You"	2020	London Grammar	Californian Soil
