= Let You Know (Flume song) =

2019 song by Australian electronic musician Flume

Single by Flume featuring London Grammar
- Released: 12 June 2019
- Recorded: 2018
- Length: 3:19
- Label: Future Classic
- Songwriter(s): Harley Streten; Hannah Reid
- Producer(s): Flume

Flume singles chronology
"Friends" (2019)	"Let You Know" (2019)	"Rushing Back" (2019)

London Grammar singles chronology
"Hell to the Liars" (2017)	"Let You Know" (2019)	"Baby It's You" (2020)

"Let You Know" is a song by Australian electronic musician Flume, co-written by and featuring singer Hannah Reid of the English indie pop band London Grammar. It was released as a single on 12 June 2019, by Australian music label Future Classic. The track was first premiered on Annie Mac's BBC Radio 1 show.

== Background ==
Flume wrote "Let You Know" with Hannah Reid of English indie pop band London Grammar in the summer of 2018 on a writing trip in London during which he also met Slowthai, who he collaborated with on the track "High Beams". In a statement, Flume explained that the track "just came together really naturally in the studio that day." Reid further revealed that the pair had wanted to collaborate "for years" but had been unable to due to their busy schedules, and added that working with the producer was "an honour because he pushes the boundaries of electronic music like nobody else."

== Critical reception ==
"Let You Know" was met with critical acclaim. Bella Bagshaw of Dancing Astronaut called the song "otherworldly" and highlighted Reid's voice's "swift, almost spectral presence, bolstering the otherworldly, journey-oriented through line of Flume's resounding revamp," while Sydney Gore of Highsnobiety described the single as a "cosmic collaboration" and "emotionally explosive." Steph Evans, writing for Earmilk, approved of Flume's choice of collaborator and hailed the track as "signature Flume at his best." The Music Network's Zanda Wilson commended the electronic artist's "uncanny ability to complement the musicality and timbre of his guest vocalist, while also staying true to his distinctive style." Lake Schatz of Consequence of Sound described the collaboration as "at times both bubbly and heartbreaking."

== Promotion ==
On 7 June 2019, Flume announced through his social media that new music would be released on 12 June 2019. This announcement also previewed the visual for the music, created by Australian graphic designer and long time Flume collaborator Jonathan Zawada.

On 11 June 2019, the track was announced alongside Flume's late 2019 European tour schedule.

== Track listings ==
Digital download

1. "Let You Know" – 3:19

Ross from Friends remix

1. "Let You Know" (Ross from Friends remix) – 4:22

Nathan C remix

1. "Let You Know" (Nathan C remix) – 3:15

== Personnel ==
Credits adapted from Tidal.

- Flume – songwriting, production
- Hannah Reid – songwriting

== Charts ==
Chart performance for "Let You Know"
Chart (2019)	Peak position
Australia (ARIA)	31
Belgium (Ultratip Bubbling Under Flanders)	9
Belgium (Ultratip Bubbling Under Wallonia)	29
Mexico Ingles Airplay (Billboard)	19
New Zealand Hot Singles (RMNZ)	9
US Hot Dance/Electronic Songs (Billboard)	20

== Certifications ==
Region	Certification	Certified units/sales
Australia (ARIA)	Gold	35,000^{‡}
New Zealand (RMNZ)	Gold	15,000^{‡}
^{‡} Sales+streaming figures based on certification alone.
