= Truth Is a Beautiful Thing (song) =

Single by London Grammar

from the album Truth Is a Beautiful Thing
- Released: 24 March 2017
- Recorded: 2014/16
- Genre: Art pop
- Length: 5:07
- Label: Metal & Dust; Ministry of Sound
- Songwriter(s): Hannah Reid; Daniel Rothman; Dominic Major
- Producer(s): London Grammar; Paul Epworth

London Grammar singles chronology
"Big Picture" (2017)	"Truth Is a Beautiful Thing" (2017)	"Oh Woman Oh Man" (2017)

"Truth Is a Beautiful Thing" is a song performed by English trio London Grammar. The song was released in the United Kingdom as a digital download on 24 March 2017 as the third single from their second studio album Truth Is a Beautiful Thing (2017).

== Track listing ==
Digital download
No.	Title	Length
1.	"Truth Is a Beautiful Thing"	5:07

== Charts ==
Chart (2017)	Peak position
France (SNEP)	40
Scotland (OCC)	55

== Release history ==
Region	Date	Format	Label
United Kingdom	24 March 2017	Digital download	Metal & Dust; Ministry of Sound
