= Truth Is a Beautiful Thing =

2017 studio album by London Grammar

Studio album by London Grammar
- Released: 9 June 2017
- Recorded: 2014–2016
- Studios: Smecky (Prague) (Note: Strings on tracks 1 and 5); The Church (London) (Note: Tracks 1, 4–10 and 13–16); State of the Ark (London) (Note: Track 3; vocals on tracks 2 and 11); Westpoint (London) (Note: Track 12); Metropolis (London) (Note: Track 17); Maida Vale (London) (Note: Track 18)
- Genres: Dream pop; trip hop
- Length: 51:48
- Labels: Metal & Dust; Ministry of Sound
- Producers: Simon Askew; Ben Baptie; Paul Epworth; Jon Hopkins; Greg Kurstin; London Grammar; Myriot

London Grammar chronology
If You Wait (2013)	Truth Is a Beautiful Thing (2017)	Californian Soil (2021)

Singles from Truth Is a Beautiful Thing
- 1. "Rooting for You" Released: 1 January 2017; 2. "Big Picture" Released: 1 February 2017; 3. "Truth Is a Beautiful Thing" Released: 24 March 2017; 4. "Oh Woman Oh Man" Released: 21 April 2017; 5. "Non Believer" Released: 11 August 2017; 6. "Hell to the Liars" Released: 10 November 2017

Truth Is a Beautiful Thing is the second studio album by English indie pop band London Grammar. It was released on 9 June 2017 by the trio's imprint Metal & Dust and Ministry of Sound.

== Singles ==
"Rooting for You" was released as the album's lead single on 1 January 2017. It peaked at number 58 on the UK Singles Chart. The album's second single, "Big Picture", was released on 1 February 2017, reaching number 73 on the UK Singles Chart. "Truth Is a Beautiful Thing" was released as the third single on 24 March 2017. "Oh Woman Oh Man" was released as the fourth single on 21 April 2017, peaking at number 85 on the UK Singles Chart. On 11 August 2017, "Non Believer" was sent to UK contemporary hit radio as the album's fifth single. The album's sixth and final single, "Hell to the Liars", was released on 10 November 2017.

== Critical reception ==
Truth Is a Beautiful Thing received mixed to positive reviews from music critics. Praise was directed at the album's atmospheric production and Hannah Reid's emotive vocals, while some critics felt that the record lacked musical variety and progression from the band's debut album, If You Wait.

Professional ratings
Aggregate scores
Source	Rating
Metacritic	68/100
Review scores
Source	Rating
AllMusic	3.5/5 stars
Clash	8/10
DIY	4/5 stars
Drowned in Sound	7/10
The Guardian	2/5 stars
The Independent	3/5 stars
musicOMH	3.5/5 stars
NME	4/5 stars
Under the Radar	7.5/10 stars

The album holds a score of 68/100 on review aggregator Metacritic, indicating "generally favorable reviews" based on 17 critics' reviews. Scott Dransfield of Under the Radar, praised the album for being an "album-length exploration of mood, or a collection of self-contained songs, than it is a flowing, conceptual, capital-A album." The Guardian awarded the album three out of five stars, commending its "cinematic and grand" production but criticizing it for being too uniform in tone. NME also gave the album four stars, stating that while London Grammar ability to craft ethereal soundscapes, but criticized the album for lacking to connect with its lyrics stating "They're not exactly expected to diss Cameron in a thunderous, anti-Brexit, but they could still say more, or go beyond a default of singing about the complex ups and downs of relationships." The Arts Desk was more critical, giving the album two out of five stars, describing it as having "dumped many of the elements that made If You Wait really shine and instead find themselves fishing around for inspiration and trying on a fair few ill-fitting hats for size."

Conversely, AllMusic rated the album three and a half stars out of five, praising its lush production and Reid's vocal performance, while The Independent rated it three stars, highlighting the lyrical themes, but stated "listeners may experience déjà vu."

== Commercial performance ==
Truth Is a Beautiful Thing debuted at number one on the UK Albums Chart with first-week sales of 43,403 copies, including 2,780 from sales-equivalent streams.

== Track listing ==
All tracks are written by Hannah Reid, Daniel Rothman and Dominic Major, except where noted.

Truth Is a Beautiful Thing track listing
No.	Title	Writer(s)	Producer(s)	Length
1.	"Rooting for You"		Paul Epworth; Myriot^{[a]}	4:29
2.	"Big Picture"		London Grammar; Jon Hopkins; Tom Elmhirst^{[b]}; Myriot^{[c]}	4:41
3.	"Wild Eyed"		London Grammar; Myriot	4:28
4.	"Oh Woman Oh Man"		Epworth	4:37
5.	"Hell to the Liars"		London Grammar; Epworth; Myriot^{[d]}	6:04
6.	"Everyone Else"	Reid; Rothman; Major; Greg Kurstin	Kurstin; Myriot^{[d]}	4:05
7.	"Non Believer"	Reid; Rothman; Major; Epworth	Epworth	4:17
8.	"Bones of Ribbon"		Epworth	4:34
9.	"Who Am I"		London Grammar	4:22
10.	"Leave the War with Me"	Reid; Rothman; Major; Kurstin	Kurstin	5:04
11.	"Truth Is a Beautiful Thing"		Epworth; Myriot^{[d]}	5:07
Total length:				51:48

Deluxe edition bonus disc
No.	Title	Writer(s)	Producer(s)	Length
12.	"What a Day"		London Grammar; Myriot^{[d]}	4:54
13.	"Different Breeds"		Epworth	3:29
14.	"Control"	Reid; Rothman; Major; Epworth	Epworth	3:05
15.	"Trials" (demo)		Ben Baptie	3:42
16.	"May the Best" (church mix)		Epworth	4:09
17.	"Rooting for You" (demo)		London Grammar	4:13
18.	"Bitter Sweet Symphony" (live at BBC Maida Vale)	Keith Richards; Mick Jagger; Richard Ashcroft	Simon Askew	3:53
Total length:				27:25

=== Notes ===
- ^{^[a]} signifies a co-producer
- ^{^[b]} signifies a vocal producer
- ^{^[c]} signifies an additional vocal producer
- ^{^[d]} signifies an additional producer

== Personnel ==
Credits adapted from the liner notes of the deluxe edition of Truth Is a Beautiful Thing.

=== London Grammar ===
- Hannah Reid – vocals (all tracks); piano (tracks 11, 14)
- Daniel Rothman – guitars
- Dot Major – drums, programming (all tracks); piano (tracks 1, 3, 5, 9, 12); Rhodes (tracks 6, 10)

=== Additional musicians ===
- Paul Epworth – drums, programming (tracks 7, 14); additional programming (track 9)
- Greg Kurstin – piano, Mellotron, Chamberlin, Orchestron, Juno-60 (track 10)
- Wil Malone – string arrangements, string conducting (tracks 1, 5)
- Lucie Švehlová – concertmaster (tracks 1, 5)
- City of Prague Philharmonic Orchestra – strings (tracks 1, 5)
- Myriot (Tim Bran and Roy Kerr) – additional programming (track 1)

=== Technical ===
- Jan Holzner – string recording (tracks 1, 5)
- London Grammar – production (tracks 2, 3, 5, 9, 12, 17); mixing (track 17)
- Paul Epworth – production (tracks 1, 4, 5, 7, 8, 11, 13, 14, 16)
- Jon Hopkins – production, mixing (track 2)
- Myriot (Tim Bran and Roy Kerr) – production (track 3); co-production (track 1); additional vocal production (track 2); additional production (tracks 5, 6, 11, 12)
- Greg Kurstin – production, engineering (tracks 6, 10)
- Ben Baptie – production (track 15); mixing (tracks 13, 15); additional engineering (tracks 4, 7–9, 13, 14)
- Simon Askew – production (track 18)
- Tom Elmhirst – vocal production; vocal mixing (track 2); mixing (tracks 1, 3–12, 14)
- Brandon Bost – mix assistance (tracks 1, 3–12, 14)
- Andy Menhenitt – mix assistance (tracks 13, 15); engineering assistance (tracks 4, 7, 8, 9, 13, 14)
- Matt Wiggins – mixing (track 16); engineering (tracks 4, 5, 7, 8, 11, 13, 16)
- Joseph Hartwell Jones – engineering (track 1)
- Riley MacIntyre – additional engineering (track 1); engineering (tracks 4, 5, 7, 8, 11, 13, 14, 16)
- Joe Visciano – engineering for mix (track 1)
- Manon Grandjean – engineering (tracks 2, 3, 11); vocal recording (track 2)
- Luke Pickering – engineering assistance (tracks 4, 8, 11, 13, 14, 16)
- Alex Pasco – engineering (tracks 6, 10)
- Julian Burg – engineering (tracks 6, 10)
- Tom Coyne – mastering (tracks 1–17)
- Kevin Tuffy – mastering (track 18)

=== Artwork ===
- Eliot Lee Hazel – cover photo
- Alexandra Waespi – inside photos
- Harry Hall – inside photos
- Leif Podhajsky – creative direction, layout

== Charts ==
=== Weekly charts ===
Weekly chart performance for Truth Is a Beautiful Thing
Chart (2017)	Peak position
Australian Albums (ARIA)	3
Austrian Albums (Ö3 Austria)	15
Belgian Albums (Ultratop Flanders)	2
Belgian Albums (Ultratop Wallonia)	1
Canadian Albums (Billboard)	29
Dutch Albums (Album Top 100)	9
French Albums (SNEP)	2
German Albums (Offizielle Top 100)	9
Greek Albums (IFPI)	24
Irish Albums (IRMA)	3
Italian Albums (FIMI)	31
New Zealand Albums (RMNZ)	10
Norwegian Albums (VG-lista)	33
Portuguese Albums (AFP)	10
Scottish Albums (Official Charts)	1
Swiss Albums (Schweizer Hitparade)	4
UK Albums (Official Charts)	1
US Billboard 200	129
US Top Alternative Albums (Billboard)	16
US Top Rock Albums (Billboard)	29

=== Year-end charts ===
2017 year-end chart performance for Truth Is a Beautiful Thing
Chart (2017)	Position
Australian Albums (ARIA)	45
Belgian Albums (Ultratop Flanders)	13
Belgian Albums (Ultratop Wallonia)	32
French Albums (SNEP)	77
Swiss Albums (Schweizer Hitparade)	63
UK Albums (OCC)	33

2018 year-end chart performance for Truth Is a Beautiful Thing
Chart (2018)	Position
Belgian Albums (Ultratop Flanders)	63
Belgian Albums (Ultratop Wallonia)	194

2019 year-end chart performance for Truth Is a Beautiful Thing
Chart (2019)	Position
Belgian Albums (Ultratop Flanders)	181

== Certifications ==
Certifications for Truth Is a Beautiful Thing
Region	Certification	Certified units/sales
Belgium (BRMA)	Gold	15,000^{‡}
France (SNEP)	Platinum	100,000^{‡}
New Zealand (RMNZ)	Gold	7,500^{‡}
United Kingdom (BPI)	Gold	100,000^{‡}
^{‡} Sales+streaming figures based on certification alone.

== Release history ==
Release dates and formats for Truth Is a Beautiful Thing
Region	Date	Format	Edition	Label	Ref(s)
Various	9 June 2017	CD; LP; digital download	Standard; deluxe	Metal & Dust; Ministry of Sound	
Australia	9 June 2017	CD; LP; digital download	Standard; deluxe	Dew Process	
France	9 June 2017	CD	Standard; deluxe	Because	
France	9 June 2017	LP+CD; digital download	Deluxe	Because	
United States	9 June 2017	LP	Standard	Columbia	
United States	9 June 2017	Digital download	Standard; deluxe	Columbia	
