= Oh Woman Oh Man =

2017 single by London Grammar

Single by London Grammar

from the album Truth Is a Beautiful Thing
- Released: 20 April 2017
- Studio: The Church (London)
- Genre: Dream pop
- Length: 4:35
- Label: Metal & Dust; Ministry of Sound
- Songwriter(s): Hannah Reid; Daniel Rothman; Dominic Major
- Producer(s): Paul Epworth

London Grammar singles chronology
"Truth Is a Beautiful Thing" (2017)	"Oh Woman Oh Man" (2017)	"Non Believer" (2017)

"Oh Woman Oh Man" is a song performed by English trio London Grammar, released on 20 April 2017 as the fourth single from their second studio album, Truth Is a Beautiful Thing (2017).

== Track listing ==
Digital download
No.	Title	Length
1.	"Oh Woman Oh Man"	4:35

Digital download - Remixes
No.	Title	Length
1.	"Oh Woman Oh Man" (Tiga Remix)	8:12
2.	"Oh Woman Oh Man" (DC Breaks Remix)	4:11
3.	"Oh Woman Oh Man" (MK Remix)	5:43

== Charts ==
Chart performance for "Oh Woman Oh Man"
Chart (2017)	Peak position
Belgium (Ultratip Bubbling Under Flanders)	6
Belgium (Ultratip Bubbling Under Wallonia)	21
France (SNEP)	95
Mexico Ingles Airplay (Billboard)	25
Scotland (OCC)	51
UK Singles (OCC)	85

== Certifications ==
Certifications for "Oh Woman Oh Man"
Region	Certification	Certified units/sales
United Kingdom (BPI)	Silver	200,000^{‡}
^{‡} Sales+streaming figures based on certification alone.

== Release history ==
Release dates and formats for "Oh Woman Oh Man"
Region	Date	Format	Label
United Kingdom	20 April 2017	Digital download	Metal & Dust; Ministry of Sound
