= Wasting My Young Years =

Single by London Grammar

from the album If You Wait
- Released: 16 June 2013
- Recorded: 2012
- Genre: Indie pop
- Length: 3:24
- Label: Metal & Dust Recordings
- Songwriter: Hannah Reid

London Grammar singles chronology
"Metal & Dust" (2013)	"Wasting My Young Years" (2013)	"Strong" (2013)

"Wasting My Young Years" is a song by English indie pop trio London Grammar. The song was released as a digital download in the United Kingdom on 16 June 2013. The song peaked at number 31 on the UK Singles Chart.

== Music video ==
The music video to accompany the release of "Wasting My Young Years" was first released on YouTube on 15 May 2013, and has 92 million views as of May 2025.

== Track listing ==
Digital download
No.	Title	Length
1.	"Wasting My Young Years"	3:24
2.	"Wasting My Young Years" (Star Slinger Remix)	3:49
3.	"Wasting My Young Years" (Kids of the Apocalypse Remix)	3:55
4.	"Wasting My Young Years" (KDA Remix)	6:29
5.	"Wasting My Young Years" (Henrik Schwarz Remix)	8:28

Australian digital download
No.	Title	Length
1.	"Wasting My Young Years"	3:24
2.	"Wasting My Young Years" (Kids of the Apocalypse Remix)	3:55
3.	"Wasting My Young Years" (Star Slinger Remix)	3:49
4.	"Wasting My Young Years" (KDA Remix)	6:29
5.	"Wasting My Young Years" (Henrik Schwarz Remix)	8:28

== Chart performance ==
=== Weekly charts ===
Chart (2013–14)	Peak position
Australia (ARIA)	62
Belgium (Ultratop 50 Flanders)	23
Belgium (Ultratop 50 Wallonia)	4
France (SNEP)	2
Scotland Singles (OCC)	34
Switzerland (Schweizer Hitparade)	11
UK Indie (OCC)	5
UK Singles (OCC)	31

=== Year-end charts ===
Chart (2013)	Position
France (SNEP)	150
Chart (2014)	Position
Belgium (Ultratop Wallonia)	39
France (SNEP)	7
Chart (2015)	Position
France (SNEP)	169

== Certifications ==
Region	Certification	Certified units/sales
New Zealand (RMNZ)	Gold	15,000^{‡}
United Kingdom (BPI)	Gold	400,000^{‡}
^{‡} Sales+streaming figures based on certification alone.

== Release history ==
Region	Date	Format	Label
United Kingdom	June 16, 2013	Digital download	Metal & Dust Recordings
Australia	July 5, 2013	Digital download	Metal & Dust Recordings
New Zealand	July 5, 2013	Digital download	Metal & Dust Recordings
