= Nightcall (song) =

2010 single by Kavinsky

Single by Kavinsky featuring Lovefoxxx

from the album OutRun
- B-side: "Pacific Coast Highway"
- Released: 2 April 2010
- Studio: Gang Recording Studio (Paris, France)
- Genre: Synth-pop; electro; synthwave
- Length: 4:19
- Label: Record Makers
- Songwriters: Kavinsky; Guy-Manuel de Homem-Christo
- Producers: Kavinsky; Guy-Manuel de Homem-Christo

Kavinsky singles chronology
"Nightcall" (2010)	"Roadgame" (2012)

"Nightcall" is a song by French electro house artist Kavinsky, released as a single in 2010. It was produced with Daft Punk's Guy-Manuel de Homem-Christo, mixed by electronic artist SebastiAn and sung by Brazilian singer Lovefoxxx. The song was performed live at the closing ceremony of the 2024 Paris Summer Olympics in August 2024 and featured Belgian singer Angèle on lead vocals as well as French band Phoenix.

== History ==
The 2010 single features Lovefoxxx, lead singer of Brazilian band CSS, on vocals and includes remixes by Xavier de Rosnay, Jackson and His Computerband and Breakbot. The track was used in the title sequence for the film Drive, directed by Nicolas Winding Refn and starring Ryan Gosling and Carey Mulligan. "Nightcall" was included on Kavinsky's debut studio album, OutRun (2013).

Kavinsky performed the song with Angèle and Phoenix at the 2024 Summer Olympics closing ceremony on 11 August 2024. A studio version of this cover was released on 20 September 2024.

== Usage in media ==
"Nightcall" plays in the background of a flashback scene in the film The Lincoln Lawyer. It also plays during the opening credits of the 2011 film Drive, and in scene 25 of Our RoboCop Remake, both directed by Nicolas Winding Refn. The song was used in a commercial for the Sony Xperia phone promoting its low-light camera features. The song is also featured in the CW show Riverdale in episode 99. In 2022 and 2023, it was used in a commercial for Volvo C40 Recharge.

The song is sampled by Russian band Bi-2 in their lead single « Чёрное солнце » on their 2017 album Горизонт событий. It was also sampled by Spanish rapper Elphomega in his song "Nitelites", produced by Doc Diamond and released on the 2016 album Nebuloso. It was sampled by Lupe Fiasco for his single "American Terrorist III", as well as by Vinny Cha$e & Kid Art for their 2012 song "Drive" as a bonus track on Golden Army. It was also sampled by Childish Gambino for his song "R.I.P" featuring Bun B on his mixtape Royalty and by Will Young for his 2012 song called "Losing Myself". "Nightcall" was covered by English band London Grammar for their debut album, If You Wait (2013). It was also covered by former Bluetones frontman Mark Morriss on his second solo album, A Flash of Darkness, and by English shoegaze band My Vitriol. It was interpolated during a live remixed performance of "Die With a Smile" by Lady Gaga for her concert film and album Apple Music Live: Mayhem Requiem.

== Track listing ==
12" single and promotional CD single
No.	Title	Writer(s)	Length
1.	"Nightcall"	Kavinsky; Guy-Manuel de Homem-Christo	4:19
2.	"Pacific Coast Highway"	Kavinsky	6:23
3.	"Nightcall (Dustin N'Guyen Remix)"	Kavinsky; de Homem-Christo	3:34
4.	"Pacific Coast Highway (Jackson Remix)"	Kavinsky	8:24

Digital bonus track
No.	Title	Writer(s)	Length
1.	"Nightcall (Breakbot Remix)"	Kavinsky; Guy-Manuel de Homem-Christo	3:39

Anniversary edition digital bonus tracks
No.	Title	Writer(s)	Length
1.	"Nightcall (Robotaki Remix)"	Kavinsky; Guy-Manuel de Homem-Christo	4:53
2.	""Nightcall" (SAWAGii Remix)"	Kavinsky; de Homem-Christo	4:47

== Personnel ==
Credits adapted from the liner notes of OutRun.

- Kavinsky – vocals, production
- Lovefoxxx – vocals
- Sebastian – mixing
- Guy-Manuel de Homem-Christo – production
- Florian Lagatta – engineering

== Charts ==
Chart (2012–2013)	Peak position
Belgium (Ultratop 50 Flanders)	28
Belgium (Ultratop 50 Wallonia)	16
France (SNEP)	10
Switzerland (Schweizer Hitparade)	37

=== Version with Angèle and Phoenix ===
==== Weekly charts ====
Chart (2024)	Peak position
Belgium (Ultratop 50 Flanders)	18
Belgium (Ultratop 50 Wallonia)	4
France (SNEP)	3

==== Year-end charts ====
Chart (2025)	Position
Belgium (Ultratop 50 Wallonia)	52
France (SNEP)	142

== Certifications ==
Region	Certification	Certified units/sales
Denmark (IFPI Danmark)	Gold	45,000^{‡}
France (SNEP)	Diamond	333,333^{‡}
Germany (BVMI)	Gold	150,000^{‡}
New Zealand (RMNZ)	Platinum	30,000^{‡}
United Kingdom (BPI)	Gold	400,000^{‡}
United States (RIAA)	Platinum	1,000,000^{‡}
^{‡} Sales+streaming figures based on certification alone.

== London Grammar version ==
"Nightcall"

Single by London Grammar

from the album If You Wait
- B-side: "Everywhere You Go"
- Released: 8 December 2013
- Recorded: 2012
- Genre: Indie pop; trip hop; ambient
- Length: 4:30
- Label: Metal & Dust
- Songwriters: Kavinsky; Guy-Manuel de Homem-Christo
- Producers: Tim Bran; Roy Kerr; London Grammar

London Grammar singles chronology
"Help Me Lose My Mind" (2013)	"Nightcall" (2013)	"Hey Now" (2014)

Music video
- "Nightcall" on YouTube

In 2013, English trio London Grammar covered "Nightcall" for their debut studio album, If You Wait (2013). The track was released as the album's fourth single on 8 December 2013. The cover received positive reviews from critics, with one writer from Fortitude Magazine saying that "London Grammar's take on the already-brilliant track is laced with sheer elegance".

=== Music video ===
A music video for the song was released on YouTube on 28 November 2013.

=== Track listings ===
- Digital download
1. "Nightcall" (radio edit) – 3:38
- Digital EP
1. "Nightcall" (LG Re-Edit) – 3:39
2. "Nightcall" (Freemasons' Pegasus Club Mix) – 7:34
3. "Nightcall" (Raaja Bones & Fyfe Dangerfield Remix) – 4:57
4. "Nightcall" (Special Request VIP) – 4:45
5. "Everywhere You Go" – 3:42
- UK limited-edition 7" single

A. "Nightcall" (album version) – 4:30
B. "Everywhere You Go" – 3:42

=== Charts ===
Chart (2013)	Peak position
Denmark (Tracklisten)	8
France (SNEP)	59
UK Singles (Official Charts)	53
UK Independent (Official Charts)	5

=== Certifications ===
Region	Certification	Certified units/sales
Denmark (IFPI Danmark)	Gold	45,000^{‡}
United Kingdom (BPI)	Silver	200,000^{‡}
^{‡} Sales+streaming figures based on certification alone.

=== Release history ===
Region	Date	Format(s)	Label	Ref.
Ireland	8 December 2013	Digital download	Metal & Dust	
United Kingdom	8 December 2013	Digital download	Metal & Dust	
