= All That Must Be =

Studio album by George FitzGerald
- Released: 9 March 2018
- Length: 44:26
- Label: Double Six

George FitzGerald chronology
Fading Love (2015)	All That Must Be (2018)

Singles from All That Must Be
- 1. "Burns" Released: 17 October 2017; 2. "Roll Back" Released: 23 January 2018

Professional ratings
Aggregate scores
Source	Rating
Metacritic	72/100
Review scores
Source	Rating
AllMusic	4/5 stars
Exclaim!	8/10
The Line of Best Fit	8/10
Loud and Quiet	5/10
Mixmag	9/10
MusicOMH	2.5/5 stars
Pitchfork	6.4/10
PopMatters	9/10
The Skinny	3/5 stars
Under the Radar	8/10

All That Must Be is the second studio album by English musician and producer George FitzGerald. It was released on 9 March 2018, under Double Six Records and Domino Recording Company.

== Critical reception ==
All That Must Be was met with "generally favorable" reviews from critics. At Metacritic, which assigns a weighted average rating out of 100 to reviews from mainstream publications, this release received an average score of 72, based on 14 reviews. Aggregator Album of the Year gave the release a 71 out of 100 based on a critical consensus of 13 reviews.

=== Accolades ===
Accolades for All That Must Be
Publication	Accolade	Rank
Esquire	Esquire's Top 50 Albums of 2018	11
Magnetic	Magnetic's Top 20 Albums of 2018	15
Mixmag	Mixmag's Top 50 Albums of 2018	20
PopMatters	PopMatters' Top 70 Albums of 2018	6
PopMatters	PopMatters' Top 50 Albums of 2018 – Mid-Year	N/A
PopMatters	PopMatters' Top 25 Electronic Albums of 2018	1

== Track listing ==
All That Must Be track listing
No.	Title	Writer(s)	Length
1.	"Two Moons Under"	George FitzGerald	5:01
2.	"Frieda"	George FitzGerald	5:30
3.	"Burns"	George FitzGerald	4:13
4.	"Roll Back"	George FitzGerald	3:28
5.	"Siren Calls"	George FitzGerald	4:00
6.	"Nobody But You" (featuring Hudson Scott, Duncan Tootill)	George FitzGerald	4:51
7.	"Outgrown" (featuring Simon Green)	George FitzGerald	6:05
8.	"Half-Light" (featuring Oliver Bayston)	George FitzGerald	3:13
9.	"The Echo Forgets" (featuring Lou Rhodes, Duncan Tootill)	George FitzGerald	4:52
10.	"Passing Trains"	George FitzGerald	3:13

== Personnel ==
Musicians

- George FitzGerald – primary artist
- Oliver Bayston – vocals
- Lou Rhodes – vocals
- Hudson Scott – vocals
- Tracey Thorn – vocals
- Bonobo – vocals

Production

- TJ Carter – producer, vocals
- Matt Colton – mastering
- Scott Knapper – engineer
- Blue May – mixer

== Charts ==
Chart performance for All That Must Be
Chart	Peak position
Belgian Albums (Ultratop Flanders)	126
Scottish Albums (Official Charts)	94
UK Albums (Official Charts)	86
UK Dance Albums (Official Charts)	2
UK Independent Albums (Official Charts)	17
