= F for You =

2013 single by Disclosure

Single by Disclosure

from the album Settle
- Released: 2 August 2013
- Genre: Deep house; electronic
- Length: 4:29
- Label: Island
- Songwriters: Howard Lawrence; Guy Lawrence
- Producer: Disclosure

Disclosure singles chronology
"You & Me" (2013)	"F for You" (2013)	"Help Me Lose My Mind" (2013)

Music video
- "Disclosure – F for You" on YouTube

"F for You" is a song by British electronic music duo Disclosure. The track is the fourth single from the duo's debut studio album, Settle. It is the first single from the album not to feature a guest vocalist, and features vocals from Howard instead.

== Charts ==
=== Weekly charts ===
Chart (2013)	Peak position
Belgium (Ultratip Bubbling Under Flanders)	7
Belgium Dance (Ultratop Flanders)	10
Belgium (Ultratip Bubbling Under Wallonia)	22
Belgium Dance (Ultratop Wallonia)	24
Scotland Singles (Official Charts)	25
UK Dance (Official Charts)	5
UK Singles (Official Charts)	20

=== Year-end charts ===
Chart (2013)	Position
UK Singles (OCC)	195

== Certifications ==
Region	Certification	Certified units/sales
United Kingdom (BPI)	Gold	400,000^{‡}
^{‡} Sales+streaming figures based on certification alone.

== Remix featuring Mary J. Blige ==
"F for You"

Single by Disclosure featuring Mary J. Blige
- Released: 1 January 2014
- Length: 6:15 (single version); 4:54 (radio edit)
- Label: Island
- Songwriters: Howard Lawrence; Guy Lawrence; Mary J. Blige
- Producer: Disclosure

Disclosure singles chronology
"Voices" (2013)	"F for You" (2014)	"The Mechanism" (2014)

Mary J. Blige singles chronology
"Don't Mind" (2012)	"F for You" (2014)	"Suitcase" (2014)

Music video
- "Disclosure – F for You ft. Mary J. Blige" on YouTube

The song was re-released in the form of a remix, it features the vocals from American singer Mary J. Blige. The remix, while retaining most of the original track from Settle, was recorded by Blige for release as a single. The single was released on 1 January 2014. The remix was nominated for Best Dance Recording at the 57th Annual Grammy Awards.

=== Track listing ===
Digital download
No.	Title	Writer(s)	Producer(s)	Length
1.	"F for You" (featuring Mary J. Blige)	Howard Lawrence; Guy Lawrence; Mary J. Blige	Disclosure	6:15

=== Charts ===
Chart (2014)	Peak position
Scotland Singles (Official Charts)	32
UK Dance (Official Charts)	7
UK Singles (Official Charts)	22
US Hot Dance/Electronic Songs (Billboard)	37

=== Year-end charts ===
Chart (2014)	Position
US Hot Dance/Electronic Songs (Billboard)	93

=== Release history ===
Region	Date	Format	Label
United Kingdom	1 January 2014	Digital download	Island
