= Hey Now (London Grammar song) =

Single by London Grammar

from the album If You Wait
- Released: 16 March 2014
- Recorded: 2012–2013
- Genre: Indie pop; ambient
- Length: 3:27
- Label: Metal & Dust Recordings
- Songwriters: Hannah Reid; Dot Major; Daniel Rothman
- Producers: Tim Bran; Roy Kerr; London Grammar

London Grammar singles chronology
"Nightcall" (2013)	"Hey Now" (2014)	"Sights" (2014)

"Hey Now" is a song by British trip hop trio London Grammar from their debut studio album If You Wait (2013). It was released in the United Kingdom on 16 March 2014 as a digital download. It has peaked at number 37 on the UK Singles Chart, and has also charted in France. It was written by Hannah Reid, Dot Major, Daniel Rothman and produced by Tim Bran, Roy Kerr and London Grammar.

== Music video ==
A music video of "Hey Now" was released on YouTube on 19 February 2014. It runs three minutes and 33 seconds. As of May 2020, it has received more than 27 million views.

== Track listing ==
Digital download
No.	Title	Length
1.	"Hey Now"	3:27
2.	"Hey Now" (Arty Remix)	5:55
3.	"Hey Now" (Tensnake Remix)	6:27
4.	"Hey Now" (Bonobo Remix)	5:45
5.	"Metal & Dust" (Studio Recording)	2:50

== Usage in Media ==
The Arty remix of the song appears in the soundtrack of the 2014 racing video game Forza Horizon 2 (played on the in-game radio station "Horizon Bass Arena"), and the 2020 BBC and Hulu miniseries Normal People. In September 2015 another remix version "Hey Now (J'adore Dior Remix by The Shoes)" was used in a Dior fragrance commercial starring Charlize Theron.

== Charts ==
Chart performance for "Hey Now"
Chart (2013–2014)	Peak position
Belgium (Ultratip Bubbling Under Flanders)	5
Belgium (Ultratip Bubbling Under Wallonia)	19
France (SNEP)	45
Scottish Singles Sales (Official Charts)	37
UK Singles (Official Charts)	37
UK Indie (Official Charts)	2
US Dance Singles Sales (Billboard)	3

== Certifications ==
Region	Certification	Certified units/sales
New Zealand (RMNZ)	Platinum	30,000^{‡}
United Kingdom (BPI)	Platinum	600,000^{‡}
^{‡} Sales+streaming figures based on certification alone.

== Release history ==
Region	Date	Format	Label
United Kingdom	16 March 2014	Digital download	Metal & Dust Recordings
United States	24 June 2014	Dance radio	Columbia Records
