= Strong (London Grammar song) =

2013 single by London Grammar

Single by London Grammar

from the album If You Wait
- Released: 1 September 2013
- Genre: Indie pop; trip hop; ambient
- Length: 3:59 (radio edit); 4:35 (album version); 4:10 (US radio edit)
- Label: Metal & Dust Recordings
- Songwriters: Hannah Reid; Dot Major; Daniel Rothman
- Producers: Tim Bran; Roy Kerr; London Grammar

London Grammar singles chronology
"Wasting My Young Years" (2013)	"Strong" (2013)	"Help Me Lose My Mind" (2013)

Music video
- "Strong" on YouTube

"Strong" is a song by British indie pop group London Grammar. The song was released as a digital download in the United Kingdom on 1 September 2013. The song peaked at number sixteen on the UK Singles Chart, making it their highest-charting single in the UK to-date. Outside the United Kingdom, "Strong" peaked within the top ten of the charts in Australia, with sales and airplay from both the original version and High Contrast remix.

== Music video ==
The music video for "Strong" was first released on YouTube on 26 July 2013. The video, directed by Sam Brown and produced by Rogue Films, was shot on location at the 6th Street Viaduct in Los Angeles with actors Nash Edgerton and Savannah Young, and pyrotechnics performed by Pyro Boy.

== Track listing ==
Digital download
No.	Title	Length
1.	"Strong" (edit)	3:59
2.	"Strong" (High Contrast remix)	5:30
3.	"Strong" (Hackman remix)	5:13
4.	"Strong" (Fracture remix)	4:35
5.	"Strong" (MrZorb remix)	3:32
6.	"Feelings"	3:46

== Charts ==
=== Weekly charts ===
Weekly chart performance for "Strong"
Chart (2013–2014)	Peak position
Australia (ARIA)	4
Austria (Ö3 Austria Top 40)	29
Belgium (Ultratop 50 Flanders)	4
Belgium (Ultratop 50 Wallonia)	6
France (SNEP)	60
Germany (GfK)	28
Ireland (IRMA)	20
Luxembourg Digital Songs (Billboard)	4
Netherlands (Dutch Top 40)	27
Netherlands (Single Top 100)	29
Netherlands (Mega Top 50)	19
New Zealand (Recorded Music NZ)	11
Scotland Singles (OCC)	16
Switzerland (Schweizer Hitparade)	32
UK Singles (OCC)	16
UK Indie (OCC)	3
US Adult Alternative Airplay (Billboard)	28

=== Year-end charts ===
Year-end chart performance for "Strong"
Chart (2014)	Position
Australia (ARIA)	44
Belgium (Ultratop 50 Flanders)	14
Belgium (Ultratop 50 Wallonia)	28
France (SNEP)	162

== Certifications ==
Certifications for "Strong"
Region	Certification	Certified units/sales
Australia (ARIA)	2× Platinum	140,000^{^}
Belgium (BRMA)	Gold	15,000^{*}
Germany (BVMI)	Platinum	300,000^{‡}
New Zealand (RMNZ)	2× Platinum	60,000^{‡}
United Kingdom (BPI)	Platinum	600,000^{‡}
^{*} Sales figures based on certification alone.^{^} Shipments figures based on certification alone.^{‡} Sales+streaming figures based on certification alone.

== Cover versions ==
In 2021, British singer Will Young covered "Strong" on his album Crying on the Bathroom Floor. Young released his cover of "Strong" as a promotional single on 22 July 2021.

== Release history ==
Region	Date	Format	Label
United Kingdom	1 September 2013	Digital download	Metal & Dust Recordings
Australia	25 October 2013	Digital download	Metal & Dust Recordings
New Zealand	25 October 2013	Digital download	Metal & Dust Recordings
United States	11 November 2013	Digital download	Metal & Dust Recordings
