= Sasha Keable =

English singer and songwriter (born 1994)

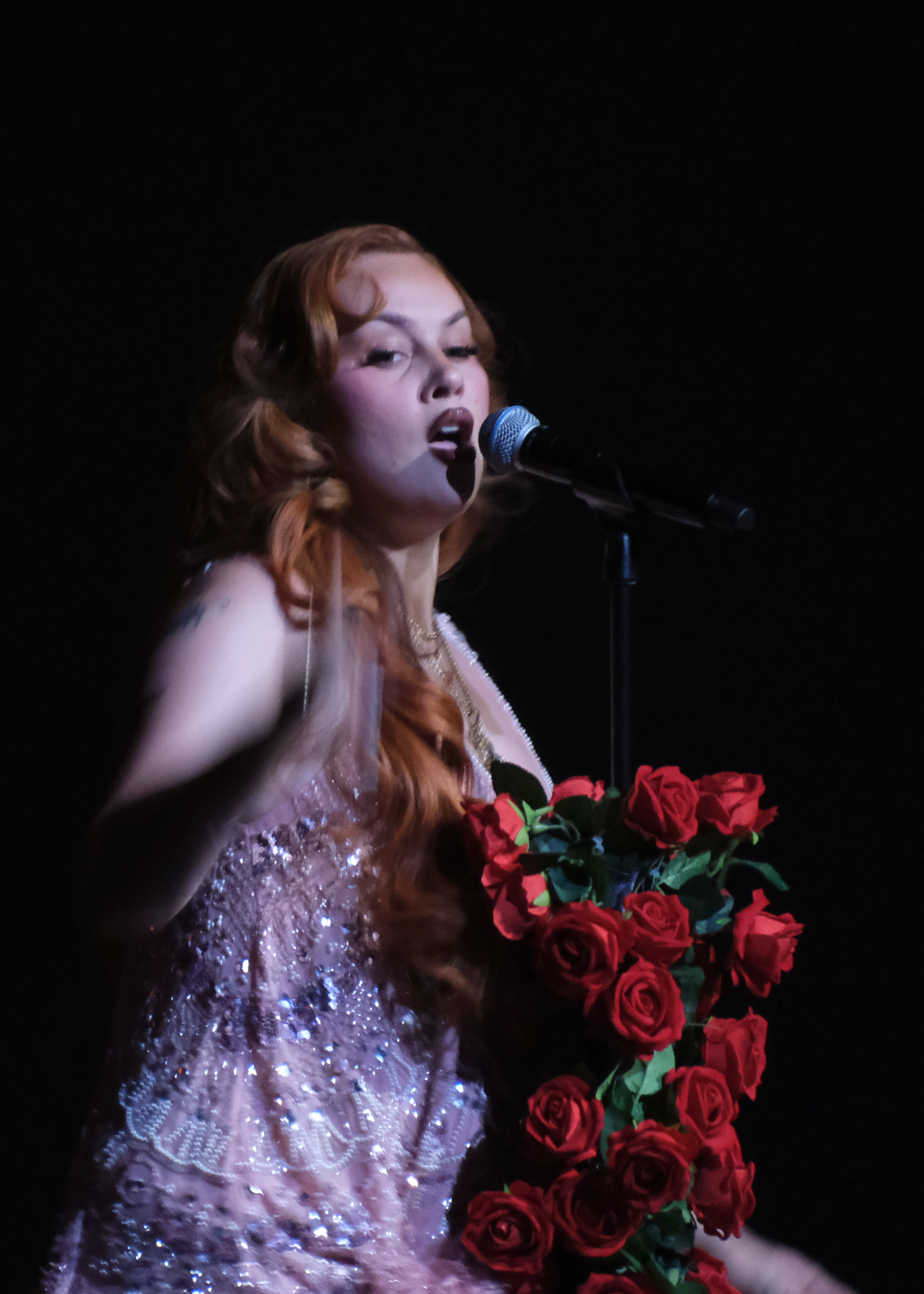
- Keable in 2026

Background information
- Born: 27 February 1994 (age 32)
- Origin: South London, England
- Genres: R&B; trip hop; soul
- Occupations: Singer; songwriter
- Instruments: Vocals; piano
- Label: Disturbing London
- Website: www.sashakeableofficial.com

Sasha Keable (born 27 February 1994) is a British singer and songwriter. In 2013, she collaborated with Disclosure on the single "Voices" and toured with the duo around the UK. In 2014, she supported singer Katy B on her UK tour. She has released two extended plays to date, Black Book (2013) and Lemongrass and Limeleaves (2014). Both were signed to Tinie Tempah's independent record label Disturbing London.

== Early life ==
Keable was born to a British father and Colombian mother. She was raised on soul and hip hop, with some of her main influences being Donny Hathaway, Aretha Franklin, Marvin Gaye and Lauryn Hill. Her eclectic tastes manifest themselves in her songwriting and arrangements, which she describes as constantly evolving. Keable graduated from BRIT School and went to sign with independent label Disturbing London founded by Tinie Tempah.

== Career ==
Keable signed a management deal with Disturbing London and also recently signed a deal with Universal Music subsidiary, Polydor Records. She released her debut EP Black Book in 2013, and has now returned to the studio with songwriter and well-known producer Dev Hynes to focus on her debut album. During 2013, she performed at London's Wireless Festival, wrote and featured on DJ Zinc's summer house track "Only for Tonight", and alongside touring with Disclosure she both co-wrote and featured on their track "Voices". On 19 May 2014, Keable released her four-track second EP Lemongrass and Limeleaves. In 2021, her seven-track EP Intermission included the single "Killing Me", a collaboration with Jorja Smith. In 2024 Keable released the single "Hold Up", which was followed up by "Auction" with Destin Conrad and "Take Your Time" featuring 6lack, with a later release of "Why".

== Personal life ==
In 2017, Keable described writing music about a man with whom she had been in a relationship for five years.

In May 2024, when discussing her sexual orientation in an interview, Keable mentioned that her then-latest music exclusively referenced female love interests. She stated that she had not been "hiding [her] sexuality," but rather "hadn't actually come out yet."

== Discography ==
=== Extended plays ===
- Black Book (2013)
- Lemongrass and Limeleaves (2014)
- Man (2019)
- Intermission (2021)
- Act Right (2025)
- Act II (2026)

=== Charted singles ===
==== As lead artist ====
List of charted singles, showing year released, chart positions and album name
Title	Year	Peak chart position	Album or EP
Title	Year	EST Air.	Album or EP
"Tai Chi"	2025	60	Act II

==== As featured artist ====
Title	Year	Peak chart positions				Album
Title	Year	UK	UK Dance	UK Indie	BEL (FL)	Album
"Only for Tonight" (DJ Zinc featuring Sasha Keable)	2013	83	16	10	—	Non-album single
"Voices" (Disclosure featuring Sasha Keable)	2013	176	28	—	104	Settle
"—" denotes a title that did not chart, or was not released in that territory.

== Awards and nominations ==
Organisation	Year	Work	Category	Result
BBC Radio 1	2026	Sasha Keable	Sound of 2026	Nominated
