= Californian Soil =

Studio album by London Grammar
- Released: 16 April 2021
- Studios: RAK (London) (Note: Strings on tracks 1, 2, 5, 8, 10 and 11); Hampstead Way (Note: Tracks 1–5, 7 and 9–12); Dean St. (London) (Note: Tracks 1–5 and 10–12); Iguana (London) (Note: Tracks 2 and 12); The Circle (Note: Tracks 4, 5 and 7); Rokstone (London) (Note: Tracks 6 and 8); The Gin Factory (London) (Note: Track 6); Assault & Battery (London) (Note: Track 8)
- Length: 44:16
- Labels: Metal & Dust; Ministry of Sound
- Producers: London Grammar; Charlie Andrew; George FitzGerald; Steve Mac

London Grammar chronology
Truth Is a Beautiful Thing (2017)	Californian Soil (2021)	The Greatest Love (2024)

Singles from Californian Soil
- 1. "Baby It's You" Released: 19 August 2020; 2. "Californian Soil" Released: 1 October 2020; 3. "Lose Your Head" Released: 4 January 2021; 4. "How Does It Feel" Released: 12 March 2021; 5. "Lord It's a Feeling" Released: 21 May 2021

Californian Soil is the third studio album by English indie pop band London Grammar, released on 16 April 2021 by Metal & Dust and Ministry of Sound. It was initially intended to be released on 12 February 2021, but was postponed for unknown reasons.

Californian Soil was preceded by four singles—"Baby It's You", the title track, "Lose Your Head" and "How Does It Feel".

== Composition ==
Thematically, although it remains a collaborative effort with the rest of the band, the album is vocalist Hannah Reid's 'story'. Reid said the album deals with themes of feminism and fame. She wrote:

This record is about gaining possession of my own life. You imagine success will be amazing. Then you see it from the inside and ask, "Why am I not controlling this thing? Why am I not allowed to be in control of it? And does that connect, in any way to being a woman? If so, how can I do that differently?"

Reid stated that things need to be different from her efforts on the preceding album (Truth Is a Beautiful Thing); "I wasn't making myself very vulnerable and I didn't feel like I was taking any risks." The songwriting was influenced by Reid's ultimatum for change following years of sexism and misogyny within the music industry:

I did say to Dan and Dot, "I don't want this to end, but something does have to change because I just can't keep doing my best work or going out on the road if I'm going to come back and feel this way."

In particular, I Need the Night addresses Reid's experiences with the music industry. America also ruminates on Reid's toxic experiences despite the fame, her fibromyalgia diagnosis and the contrasts between poverty and beauty while travelling. Major emphasised that the band supported Reid's direction for the album; "lyrically, Californian Soil is very much about Hannah’s experience as a woman, and we wanted that message to come through as loud as possible."

== Production ==
Writing and demoing for the album began in 2017 at Rothman's home, in his hidden 'Narnia' studio. It was the first time the band had begun production on an album without an executive producer. How Does It Feel and Call Your Friends were written initially by Reid and producer Steve Mac in separate writing sessions, before eventually the rest of the band finalised the songs. Reid acknowledged that the album's external producers - Mac, George FitzGerald and Charlie Andrew - were all male, which stands out given the album's feminist themes: "it was a big conflict within me ... It’s changing now but there aren’t many female producers out there. That’s something that I really hope can change and it’s something that I do want to think about for a fourth album." The album was completed in 2019, and initially scheduled for a 2020 release. However, the band chose to delay the release to 2021 due to the pandemic: "we felt this was the most upbeat album we have probably ever made. In the middle of a pandemic, there is a risk that this just won’t connect right now. There was no rush and I’m glad we waited.”

== Release ==
The album was announced on 1 October 2020, alongside the release of the title track. The band said the track was a "turning point" for them, deciding to name the album after the song.

On 5 January 2021, the band posted on their Twitter page that the release date had been postponed to 9 April of that same year, before being subsequently pushed back to 16 April. No reason was given for either delay.

== Promotion ==
=== Singles ===
Californian Soil was preceded by four singles: "Baby It's You", released on 19 August 2020, the title track, released on 1 October 2020, "Lose Your Head", released on 4 January 2021 and "How Does It Feel" on 12 March 2021. "Lord It's a Feeling" was released as the fifth single on 21 May 2021.

== Critical reception ==
Professional ratings
Aggregate scores
Source	Rating
AnyDecentMusic?	6.9/10
Metacritic	77/100
Review scores
Source	Rating
AllMusic	4.5/5 stars
Clash	8/10
The Daily Telegraph	4/5 stars
The Guardian	3/5 stars
The Independent	4/5 stars
The Line of Best Fit	9/10
NME	4/5 stars
Pitchfork	6.2/10
Slant Magazine	2/5 stars
Under the Radar	8/10 stars

Californian Soil received generally positive reviews from music critics. On Metacritic, which assigns a normalised score out of 100 to ratings from publications, the album received an average score of 77 based on 10 reviews. Christopher Hamilton-Peach of The Line of Best Fit said that "London Grammar use Californian Soil to hone their lush sonics and embrace the future". Hannah Mylrea of NME wrote that "London Grammar are revitalised...[they] are more confident, and more fun, than they’ve ever been."

The Guardian's Alim Kheraj stated that "the British trio stick to boilerplate emoting and bland imagery, but there are small sonic steps forward". Writing for Pitchfork, Hannah Jocelyn wrote that "the UK electronic-pop trio's third album draws on a renewed sense of extroversion and energy, which can't always overcome its lyrical and production missteps." Praising the album's surrealist sound and tone, The Daily Telegraph's Neil McCormick said that the album was "hypnotically compelling". However, Slant Magazine's Charles Lyons-Burt felt that "the band's willingness to harness the latest sonic trends is hit and (mostly) miss."

== Track listing ==
All tracks are written by Hannah Reid, Daniel Rothman and Dominic Major, except where noted.

Californian Soil track listing
No.	Title	Writer(s)	Producer(s)	Length
1.	"Intro"		London Grammar	2:25
2.	"Californian Soil"		London Grammar; Charlie Andrew	3:41
3.	"Missing"		London Grammar	3:35
4.	"Lose Your Head"	Reid; Rothman; Major; George FitzGerald	London Grammar; FitzGerald	3:19
5.	"Lord It's a Feeling"		London Grammar; FitzGerald^{[a]}	4:12
6.	"How Does It Feel"	Reid; Rothman; Major; Steve Mac; Al Shux	London Grammar; Mac	3:31
7.	"Baby It's You"	Reid; Rothman; Major; FitzGerald	London Grammar; FitzGerald	4:02
8.	"Call Your Friends"	Reid; Rothman; Major; Mac	London Grammar; Mac	3:11
9.	"All My Love"		London Grammar	4:32
10.	"Talking"		London Grammar	3:23
11.	"I Need the Night"		London Grammar	4:20
12.	"America"		London Grammar; Andrew	4:05
Total length:				44:16

=== Notes ===
- ^{^[a]} signifies an additional producer

== Personnel ==
Credits adapted from the liner notes of Californian Soil.

=== London Grammar ===
- Hannah Reid – vocals, keys, programming
- Daniel Rothman – guitars, keys, programming
- Dot Major – drums, keys, programming

=== Additional musicians ===
- Sally Herbert – string arrangements, conducting (tracks 1, 2, 5, 8, 10, 11)
- Olli Cunningham – score supervision
- Everton Nelson – string leader, violin (tracks 1, 2, 5, 8, 10, 11)
- Bruce White – viola (tracks 1, 2, 5, 8, 10, 11)
- Claire Orsler – viola (tracks 1, 2, 5, 8, 10, 11)
- Rachel Robson – viola (tracks 1, 2, 5, 8, 10, 11)
- Alison Dods – violin (tracks 1, 2, 5, 8, 10, 11)
- Ian Humphries – violin (tracks 1, 2, 5, 8, 10, 11)
- Julia Singleton – violin (tracks 1, 2, 5, 8, 10, 11)
- Marianne Haynes – violin (tracks 1, 2, 5, 8, 10, 11)
- Richard George – violin (tracks 1, 2, 5, 8, 10, 11)
- Rick Koster – violin (tracks 1, 2, 5, 8, 10, 11)
- Warren Zielinski – violin (tracks 1, 2, 5, 8, 10, 11)
- Chris Laurence – double bass (tracks 1, 2, 5, 8, 10, 11)
- Chris Dorsey – cello (tracks 1, 2, 5, 8, 10, 11)
- Ian Burdge – cello (tracks 1, 2, 5, 8, 10, 11)
- Tony Woollard – cello (tracks 1, 2, 5, 8, 10, 11)
- Kirsty Mangan – original string arrangements, additional keys (track 2); viola, violin (tracks 2, 12); string arrangements (track 12)
- Rachael Lander – cello (track 2)
- Andy Marshall – double bass (tracks 2, 12)
- Vula Malinga – backing vocals (track 3); additional vocals (track 5)
- Sharlene Hector – backing vocals (track 3)
- Mike Hough – backing vocals (track 3)
- Phebe Edwards – backing vocals (track 3)
- Brendan Reilly – backing vocals (track 3)
- George FitzGerald – additional pads, effects (tracks 4, 5, 7); additional programming (track 11)
- Hal Ritson – additional guitar (track 5)
- Steve Mac – additional keyboards (tracks 6, 8)
- Chris Laws – additional drums (tracks 6, 8)
- My Riot – additional programming (track 2)
- Hoskins – additional programming (track 11)

=== Technical ===
- Robbie Nelson – string recording (tracks 1, 2, 5, 8, 10, 11)
- London Grammar – production
- Charlie Andrew – production (tracks 2, 12)
- George FitzGerald – production (tracks 4, 7); additional production (track 5)
- Steve Mac – production (tracks 6, 8)
- My Riot – additional vocal recording (track 12)
- Tom Elmhirst – mixing (Note: Mixed at Electric Lady Studios (New York City)) (tracks 1–5, 8–12)
- Matthew Scatchell – engineering for mix (tracks 8, 10–12)
- Nathan Boddy – mixing (track 7)
- Serban Ghenea – mixing (Note: Mixed at MixStar Studios (Virginia Beach, Virginia)) (track 6)
- John Hanes – engineering for mix (track 6)
- Matt Wiggins – engineering (tracks 1–6, 8–12)
- Jay Pocknell – engineering (tracks 2, 12)
- Dann Pursey – engineering (tracks 6, 8)
- Chris Laws – engineering (tracks 6, 8)
- Chris Gehringer – mastering (Note: Mastered at Sterling Sound (New York City))

=== Artwork ===
- Crowns & Owls – creative direction, photography
- Catalogue – graphic design

== Charts ==
=== Weekly charts ===
2021 weekly chart performance for Californian Soil
Chart (2021)	Peak position
Australian Albums (ARIA)	1
Austrian Albums (Ö3 Austria)	6
Belgian Albums (Ultratop Flanders)	4
Belgian Albums (Ultratop Wallonia)	3
Dutch Albums (Album Top 100)	4
French Albums (SNEP)	3
German Albums (Offizielle Top 100)	10
Irish Albums (Official Charts)	2
New Zealand Albums (RMNZ)	2
Scottish Albums (Official Charts)	1
Swiss Albums (Schweizer Hitparade)	1
UK Albums (Official Charts)	1
US Top Current Album Sales (Billboard)	50

2025–2026 weekly chart performance for Californian Soil
Chart (2025–2026)	Peak position
Greek Albums (IFPI)	39

=== Year-end charts ===
Year-end chart performance for Californian Soil
Chart (2021)	Position
Belgian Albums (Ultratop Flanders)	116
Belgian Albums (Ultratop Wallonia)	109
French Albums (SNEP)	153
Swiss Albums (Schweizer Hitparade)	74
UK Albums (OCC)	75

== Certifications ==
Certifications for Californian Soil
Region	Certification	Certified units/sales
France (SNEP)	Gold	50,000^{‡}
United Kingdom (BPI)	Gold	100,000^{‡}
^{‡} Sales+streaming figures based on certification alone.

== Release history ==
Release history for Californian Soil
Region	Date	Formats	Label
Various	16 April 2021	CD; LP; cassette; hardback box set; digital download; streaming	Metal & Dust; Ministry of Sound
Australia	16 April 2021	CD; LP	Dew Process
