= Rooting for You (London Grammar song) =

Single by London Grammar

from the album Truth Is a Beautiful Thing
- Released: 1 January 2017
- Genre: Dream pop
- Length: 4:29
- Label: Ministry of Sound; Sony Music
- Songwriter(s): Daniel Rothman; Dominic Major; Hannah Reid
- Producer(s): Paul Epworth; MyRiot

London Grammar singles chronology
"If You Wait" (2014)	"Rooting for You" (2017)	"Big Picture" (2017)

"Rooting for You" is a song by English trio London Grammar. The song was released by Ministry of Sound and Sony Music in the United Kingdom on 1 January 2017 as the lead single from their second studio album Truth Is a Beautiful Thing (2017), the song has peaked at number 58 on the UK Singles Chart. It was written by the three members of London Grammar, and produced by Paul Epworth and MyRiot.

== Music video ==
The music video for the song was directed by Bison, where two minutes of the song are performed a cappella. The video edit was produced by Sonya Sier and Zoe Wheeler.

== Track listing ==
Digital download
No.	Title	Length
1.	"Rooting for You"	4:29

== Charts ==
Chart (2017)	Peak position
Belgium (Ultratip Bubbling Under Flanders)	133
Belgium (Ultratip Bubbling Under Wallonia)	43
France (SNEP)	55
Ireland (IRMA)	72
Scotland (OCC)	45
Sweden Heatseeker (Sverigetopplistan)	7
UK Singles (OCC)	58

== Certifications ==
Region	Certification	Certified units/sales
United Kingdom (BPI)	Silver	200,000^{‡}
^{‡} Sales+streaming figures based on certification alone.

== Release history ==
Region	Date	Format	Label
United Kingdom	1 January 2017	Digital download	Ministry of Sound; Sony Music
