= Voices (Disclosure song) =

Single by Disclosure featuring Sasha Keable

from the album Settle
- Released: 13 December 2013
- Genre: UK garage
- Length: 4:05
- Label: PMR; Island
- Songwriter(s): Guy Lawrence; Howard Lawrence; James Napier; Sasha Keable
- Producer(s): Disclosure

Disclosure singles chronology
"Together" (2013)	"Voices" (2013)	"F for You" (2014)

Sasha Keable singles chronology
"Only for Tonight" (2013)	"Voices" (2013)

Music video
- "Disclosure – Voices ft. Sasha Keable" on YouTube

"Voices" is a song by British electronic music duo Disclosure, featuring vocals from Sasha Keable. It was released as a digital download in the United Kingdom on 13 December 2013. The song is the sixth single from the duo's debut studio album, Settle (2013). The track peaked at number 176 on the UK Singles Chart and number 28 on the UK Dance Chart. It was written by Guy Lawrence, Howard Lawrence, Jimmy Napes, and Sasha Keable.

== Music video ==
A music video to accompany the release of "Voices" was first released onto YouTube on 23 December 2013 at a total length of three minutes and forty-seven seconds.

== Track listings ==
Album version
No.	Title	Length
1.	"Voices" (featuring Sasha Keable)	4:05

Digital download
No.	Title	Length
1.	"Voices" (Le Youth remix) (featuring Sasha Keable)	4:27

== Chart performance ==
=== Weekly charts ===
Chart (2013)	Peak position
Belgium (Ultratip Bubbling Under Flanders)	54
UK Dance (OCC)	28
UK Singles (OCC)	176

== Release history ==
Country	Date	Format	Label
United Kingdom	13 December 2013	Digital download	PMR; Island
