= Metal & Dust =

Single by London Grammar

from the album If You Wait
- Released: 25 February 2013
- Recorded: 2012
- Genre: Indie pop; trip hop; ambient
- Length: 3:28
- Label: Metal & Dust Recordings
- Songwriter(s): Dot Major; Hannah Reid; Dan Rothman

London Grammar singles chronology
"Metal & Dust" (2013)	"Wasting My Young Years" (2013)

"Metal & Dust" is a song written by Dot Major, Hannah Reid and Dan Rothman of British indie pop band London Grammar. The song was originally recorded by the band for inclusion on their debut studio album, If You Wait, and appears as the eighth track on the album. The song served as the band's debut single, being released as a maxi single on 25 February 2013.

== Samples ==
Rapper/producer Impossible Beats sampled the song in his 2014 single "High School" from his album Truancy.

== Track listings ==
Digital download
No.	Title	Length
1.	"Metal & Dust"	3:27
2.	"Hey Now"	3:27
3.	"Darling Are You Gonna Leave Me"	3:00
4.	"Hey Now" (Dot Major Remix)	5:37

Canadian digital download
No.	Title	Length
1.	"Metal & Dust"	3:27
2.	"Hey Now"	3:27
3.	"Wasting My Young Years"	3:24
4.	"Hey Now" (Dot Major Remix)	5:37

7" single(MAD001T)
No.	Title	Length
1.	"Metal & Dust"	3:27
2.	"Hey Now"	3:27

== Charts ==
=== Weekly charts ===
Chart (2013)	Peak position
UK Singles (OCC)	105

== Release history ==
Country	Date	Format	Label	Catalog no.
Commercial releases
United Kingdom	25 February 2013	Digital download	Metal & Dust	—
United Kingdom	4 March 2013	7"	Metal & Dust	MAD001T
Australia	17 May 2013	Digital download	Metal & Dust	—
New Zealand	17 May 2013	Digital download	Metal & Dust	—
Canada	24 June 2013	Digital download	Metal & Dust	—
Promotional releases
United Kingdom	25 February 2013	CD-R (Modern rock / Alternative radio)	Metal & Dust	—
