= If You Wait =

Studio album by London Grammar
- Released: 6 September 2013
- Recorded: 2012–2013
- Studio: State of the Ark (Richmond, London); Sofa Sound (London) (Note: Vocals on tracks 2–10); Smecky (Prague) (Note: Strings on tracks 4, 5, 8 and 11)
- Genre: Electronica; downtempo; pop
- Length: 43:22
- Label: Metal & Dust; Ministry of Sound
- Producer: Tim Bran; Roy Kerr; London Grammar

London Grammar chronology
If You Wait (2013)	Truth Is a Beautiful Thing (2017)

Singles from If You Wait
- 1. "Metal & Dust" Released: 25 February 2013; 2. "Wasting My Young Years" Released: 16 June 2013; 3. "Strong" Released: 1 September 2013; 4. "Nightcall" Released: 8 December 2013; 5. "Hey Now" Released: 16 March 2014; 6. "Sights" Released: 1 June 2014; 7. "If You Wait" Released: 12 October 2014

If You Wait is the debut studio album by English indie pop band London Grammar, released on 6 September 2013 by Metal & Dust Recordings and Ministry of Sound. Seven singles were released from the album: "Metal & Dust", "Wasting My Young Years", "Strong", "Nightcall", "Hey Now", "Sights" and "If You Wait". The album debuted at number two on the UK Albums Chart with first-week sales of 33,130 copies.

== Background ==
After signing with Ministry of Sound and Big Life Management, the band began the first sessions of the album in early 2012 with Cam Blackwood. Later that year he was replaced by Tim Bran and Roy Kerr. Hannah Reid commented on the collaboration, saying, "Tim is amazing at recording, of finding the best way of recording a guitar or my vocal. Roy had the strongest relationship with Dot and they worked on production together."

The album's lyrics are mainly based upon vocalist Hannah Reid's personal life, in particular her troubled teenage years, prompting The Guardian to suggest that this was "the first quarter-life-crisis album."

== Critical reception ==
Professional ratings
Aggregate scores
Source	Rating
AnyDecentMusic?	6.9/10
Metacritic	75/100
Review scores
Source	Rating
AllMusic	3.5/5 stars
Consequence of Sound	4/5 stars
The Guardian	3/5 stars
The Independent	4/5 stars
Mixmag	4/5
NME	7/10
The Observer	3/5 stars
Pitchfork	7.1/10
PopMatters	9/10
Q	3/5 stars

If You Wait received generally positive reviews from music critics. At Metacritic, which assigns a normalised rating out of 100 to reviews from mainstream publications, the album received an average score of 75, based on 19 reviews.

Andy Gill of The Independent summarised the album's production and instrumentation as "all beautifully sketched to evoke the crepuscular intimacies of the songs."

A large quantity of praise went to the vocal ability of Reid, whose husky contralto vocals have been described as "defining and soulful" by Clash magazine and "emotive" and "folky" by Drowned in Sound. Her voice has been compared to artists like Florence Welch of Florence and the Machine, Annie Lennox, and Julee Cruise. Benji Taylor of Pretty Much Amazing wrote a favourable review of the album, calling it "an enthralling, stunning, deeply emotive album that perfectly marries understated electronica to sublime vocals and melodies." Vocalist Hannah Reid's voice was particularly praised: "underscored by an enduring brittle beauty and an underlying otherworldliness, as if she honed her craft singing amidst the gardens of Lothlorien, or some far-flung corner of Westeros."

== Commercial performance ==
If You Wait entered the UK Albums Chart at number two, selling 33,130 copies in its first week. As of June 2017, it had sold 642,301 copies in the United Kingdom. In the United States, the album debuted at number 91 on the Billboard 200 with 4,000 copies sold.

== Track listing ==
All tracks produced by Tim Bran, Roy Kerr and London Grammar, except where noted.

No.	Title	Lyrics	Music	Length
1.	"Hey Now"	Hannah Reid	Reid; Daniel Rothman; Dot Major	3:27
2.	"Stay Awake"	Reid	Reid; Rothman; Major	3:05
3.	"Shyer"	Reid	Reid; Rothman; Major; Joel Pott	3:07
4.	"Wasting My Young Years"	Reid	Reid	3:24
5.	"Sights"	Reid	Reid; Rothman; Major	4:13
6.	"Strong"	Reid	Reid; Rothman; Major	4:35
7.	"Nightcall"	Vincent Belorgey; Guy-Manuel de Homem-Christo	Belorgey; Homem-Christo	4:30
8.	"Metal & Dust"	Reid	Reid; Rothman; Major	3:28
9.	"Interlude" (live)	Reid	Reid	4:04
10.	"Flickers"	Reid; Rothman	Reid; Rothman; Major	4:45
11.	"If You Wait"	Reid	Reid	4:44
Total length:				43:22

US edition bonus tracks
No.	Title	Lyrics	Music	Producer(s)	Length
12.	"High Life"	Reid	Reid; Rothman; Major		4:03
13.	"Maybe"	Reid	Reid; Rothman; Major		4:23
14.	"Strong" (US radio edit)	Reid	Reid; Rothman; Major	Bran; Kerr; London Grammar; Emile Haynie^{[a]}	4:10
Total length:					55:58

Japanese edition bonus tracks
No.	Title	Lyrics	Music	Producer(s)	Length
12.	"Help"	Reid	Reid; Rothman; Major		3:53
13.	"Darling Are You Gonna Leave Me"	Reid	Reid; Rothman; Major	Bran; Kerr	3:02
14.	"High Life"	Reid	Reid; Rothman; Major		4:03
15.	"Maybe"	Reid	Reid; Rothman; Major		4:23
16.	"When We Were Young"	Reid	Reid; Rothman; Major		3:06
17.	"Feelings"				3:46
18.	"Everywhere You Go"				3:42
Total length:					69:17

Deluxe edition and French collector's edition bonus disc
No.	Title	Lyrics	Music	Producer(s)	Length
1.	"Help"	Reid	Reid; Rothman; Major		3:53
2.	"Darling Are You Gonna Leave Me"	Reid	Reid; Rothman; Major	Bran; Kerr	3:02
3.	"Help Me Lose My Mind" (Disclosure featuring London Grammar)	Reid	Guy Lawrence; Howard Lawrence; Reid	Disclosure	4:06
4.	"High Life"	Reid	Reid; Rothman; Major		4:03
5.	"Maybe"	Reid	Reid; Rothman; Major		4:23
6.	"When We Were Young"	Reid	Reid; Rothman; Major		3:06
Total length:					22:33

=== Notes ===
- ^{^[a]} signifies a co-producer

== Personnel ==
Credits adapted from the liner notes of If You Wait.

=== London Grammar ===
- Hannah Reid
- Daniel Rothman
- Dot Major

=== Additional musicians ===
- Tim Bran – additional programming (all tracks); additional keyboards (tracks 4, 7)
- Roy Kerr – additional programming
- Dot Major – additional programming (tracks 4, 7)
- Wil Malone – string arrangements, string conducting (tracks 4, 5, 8, 11)
- Tony Stanton – strings preparation (tracks 4, 5, 8, 11)
- City of Prague Philharmonic Orchestra – strings (tracks 4, 5, 8, 11)

=== Technical ===
- Tim Bran – production
- Roy Kerr – production
- London Grammar – production
- Manon Grandjean – engineering
- Ben Siegal – engineering (tracks 3, 8, 10, 11); vocal recording, piano recording (track 11)
- Jan Holzner – string recording (tracks 4, 5, 8, 11)
- James Fitzpatrick – orchestra contractor (tracks 4, 5, 8, 11)
- Kevin "KD" Davis – mixing
- Tom Coyne – mastering

=== Artwork ===
- Mat Maitland – art direction
- Markus Karlsson – art direction
- Lee Kirby – photography

== Charts ==
=== Weekly charts ===
Weekly chart performance for If You Wait
Chart (2013–2015)	Peak position
Australian Albums (ARIA)	2
Austrian Albums (Ö3 Austria)	73
Belgian Albums (Ultratop Flanders)	7
Belgian Albums (Ultratop Wallonia)	3
Danish Albums (Hitlisten)	24
Dutch Albums (Album Top 100)	11
French Albums (SNEP)	6
German Albums (Offizielle Top 100)	34
Greek Albums (IFPI)	25
Irish Albums (IRMA)	9
Irish Independent Albums (IRMA)	1
Italian Albums (FIMI)	93
New Zealand Albums (RMNZ)	13
Norwegian Albums (VG-lista)	29
Scottish Albums (OCC)	2
Swiss Albums (Schweizer Hitparade)	8
UK Albums (OCC)	2
UK Independent Albums (OCC)	1
US Billboard 200	91
US Top Alternative Albums (Billboard)	16
US Top Rock Albums (Billboard)	20

=== Year-end charts ===
2013 year-end chart performance for If You Wait
Chart (2013)	Position
Australian Albums (ARIA)	87
Belgian Albums (Ultratop Wallonia)	182
French Albums (SNEP)	95
UK Albums (OCC)	33

2014 year-end chart performance for If You Wait
Chart (2014)	Position
Australian Albums (ARIA)	23
Belgian Albums (Ultratop Flanders)	9
Belgian Albums (Ultratop Wallonia)	9
Dutch Albums (Album Top 100)	55
French Albums (SNEP)	21
Swiss Albums (Schweizer Hitparade)	27
UK Albums (OCC)	17

2015 year-end chart performance for If You Wait
Chart (2015)	Position
Belgian Albums (Ultratop Flanders)	27
Belgian Albums (Ultratop Wallonia)	48

2019 year-end chart performance for If You Wait
Chart (2019)	Position
Belgian Albums (Ultratop Flanders)	189

2021 year-end chart performance for If You Wait
Chart (2021)	Position
Belgian Albums (Ultratop Flanders)	189

2025 year-end chart performance for If You Wait
Chart (2025)	Position
Belgian Albums (Ultratop Flanders)	187

=== Decade-end charts ===
Chart (2010–2019)	Position
UK Albums (OCC)	91

== Certifications ==
Certifications for If You Wait
Region	Certification	Certified units/sales
Australia (ARIA)	Platinum	70,000^{^}
Belgium (BRMA)	Platinum	30,000^{*}
Denmark (IFPI Danmark)	Platinum	20,000^{‡}
Germany (BVMI)	Gold	100,000^{‡}
United Kingdom (BPI)	2× Platinum	642,301
^{*} Sales figures based on certification alone.^{^} Shipments figures based on certification alone.^{‡} Sales+streaming figures based on certification alone.

== Release history ==
Release dates and formats for If You Wait
Region	Date	Format	Edition	Label	Ref(s)
Australia	6 September 2013	CD; digital download	Standard; deluxe	Dew Process	
Australia	6 September 2013	LP	Standard	Dew Process	
France	9 September 2013	CD	Standard	Because	
United Kingdom	9 September 2013	CD; digital download	Standard; deluxe	Metal & Dust; Ministry of Sound	
United Kingdom	9 September 2013	LP	Standard	Metal & Dust; Ministry of Sound	
United States	10 September 2013	Digital download	Standard	Columbia	
Germany	11 October 2013	Digital download	Deluxe	Polydor; Island	
Germany	15 November 2013	CD	Standard; deluxe	Island	
United States	25 March 2014	CD	US standard	Columbia	
United States	25 March 2014	Digital download	US deluxe	Columbia	
United States	1 April 2014	LP	US standard	Columbia	
France	28 April 2014	LP + CD	Standard (LP); deluxe (CD)	Because	
Japan	18 June 2014	CD; digital download	Japan standard	Universal	
France	24 November 2014	CD	Collector's	Because	
