= Tenderly / Flow =

"Tenderly" / "Flow"

Single by Disclosure
- Released: 30 June 2012
- Recorded: 2011–12
- Genre: House; garage house
- Length: 5:04
- Label: Make Mine
- Songwriter(s): Howard Lawrence; Guy Lawrence
- Producer(s): Disclosure

Disclosure singles chronology
"Offline Dexterity / Street Light Chronicle" (2010)	"Tenderly" / "Flow" (2012)	"Boiling" (2012)

"Tenderly" / "Flow" is a single by British electronic music duo Disclosure. It was released as a digital download, by Make Mine in the United Kingdom on 30 June 2012. The song has charted in Belgium.

== Track listings ==
Digital download
No.	Title	Length
1.	"Tenderly"	5:04
2.	"Flow"	5:09

== Charts ==
Chart (2012)	Peak position
Belgium (Ultratip Bubbling Under Flanders)	66

== Release history ==
Region	Date	Format	Label
United Kingdom	30 June 2012	7"; digital download	Make Mine
