= Help Me Lose My Mind =

Single by Disclosure featuring London Grammar

from the album Settle
- Released: 25 October 2013
- Recorded: 2012
- Genre: Electronic; deep house
- Length: 5:35
- Label: PMR; Island
- Songwriters: Guy Lawrence; Howard Lawrence; Hannah Reid
- Producer: Disclosure

Disclosure singles chronology
"F for You" (2013)	"Help Me Lose My Mind" (2013)	"Together" (2013)

London Grammar singles chronology
"Strong" (2013)	"Help Me Lose My Mind" (2013)	"Nightcall" (2013)

Licensed audio
- "Help Me Lose My Mind" on YouTube

"Help Me Lose My Mind" is a song by British electronic music duo Disclosure, it features the vocals from English art rock trio London Grammar. It was released as a digital download in the United Kingdom on 25 October 2013. The track is the fifth single from the duo's debut studio album, Settle (2013). The song was written by Guy Lawrence, Howard Lawrence and Hannah Reid.

== Track listing ==
Digital download
No.	Title	Writer(s)	Producer(s)	Length
1.	"Help Me Lose My Mind" (Pearson Sound vocal remix) (featuring London Grammar)	Guy Lawrence; Howard Lawrence; Hannah Reid	Disclosure	5:35

== Charts ==
Chart (2013–2015)	Peak position
Belgium (Ultratip Bubbling Under Flanders)	27
Ireland (IRMA)	97
Romania (Romanian Radio Airplay) Mazde Remix	1
UK Singles (OCC)	53
UK Dance (OCC)	10
US Hot Dance/Electronic Songs (Billboard)	45

== Certifications ==
Region	Certification	Certified units/sales
New Zealand (RMNZ)	Gold	15,000^{‡}
United Kingdom (BPI)	Gold	400,000^{‡}
^{‡} Sales+streaming figures based on certification alone.

== Release history ==
Country	Date	Format	Label
United Kingdom	25 October 2013	Digital download	PMR; Island
