= Hannah Reid =

British singer (born 1989)

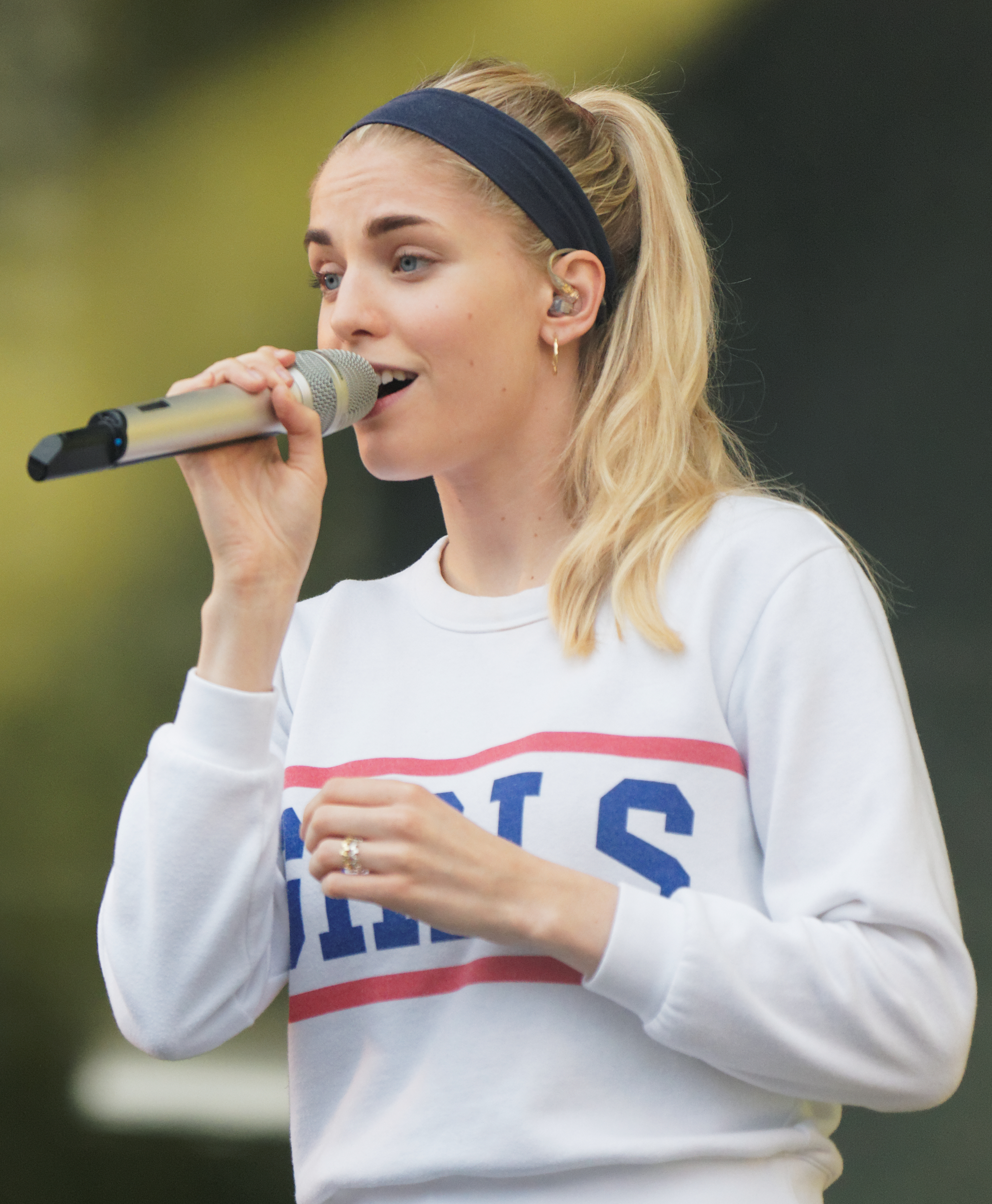
- Hannah performing at Vieilles Charrues Festival 2015

Background information
- Born: Hannah Felicity May Reid; 30 December 1989 (age 36); London, England
- Occupations: Singer; songwriter
- Member of: London Grammar
- Website: londongrammar.com

Hannah Felicity May Reid (born 30 December 1989) is an English musician who is the lead singer of the indie pop band London Grammar.

== Biography ==
Reid grew up in Acton and went to school in West London and received classical vocal training in her teens. She was initially planning to pursue acting after earning a drama scholarship, until deciding to pursue psychoanalysis as a career, working as a hairdresser and in a bar before going to university. Reid was studying art history and English at the University of Nottingham where she met guitarist Dan Rothman in a hall of residence. Together with Rothman and Dominic 'Dot' Major, she started the band London Grammar in 2009.

Reid's battle with stage fright has been widely reported, saying in an interview that "sometimes the nerves don't lift at all, and I just feel horrible, and panicky throughout". To help combat this, she started practising Emotional Freedom Technique.

Reid is known for her expansive vocal range and emotive contralto voice.

== Personal life ==
Hannah Reid has been in a relationship with Sean O'Connor for several years. Together they have a son, Joshua Cillian Reid O'Connor.

In 2013, the BBC Radio 1 Breakfast Show posted a tweet about her appearance, calling her "fit" and encouraging public input, and Reid commented on the "casual sexism" this showed. The show posted an apology.
