= London Grammar =

British indie pop band

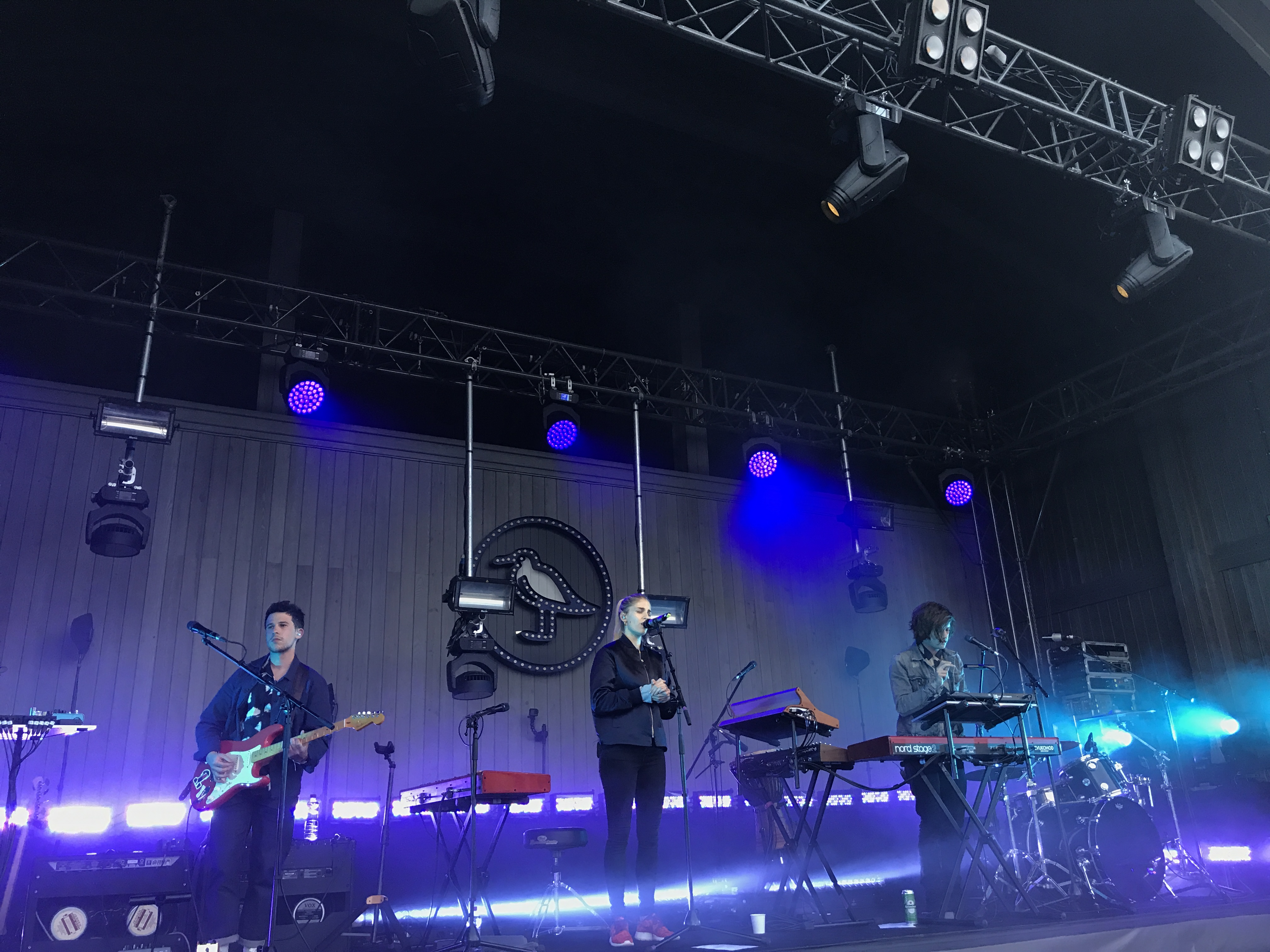
- London Grammar performing in St. Petersburg 2017

Background information
- Origin: Nottingham, England
- Genres: Indie pop; dream pop; trip hop; electronica; art rock; art pop
- Years active: 2009–present
- Labels: Metal & Dust; Ministry of Sound; Columbia; Dew Process
- Members: Hannah Reid; Dot Major; Dan Rothman
- Website: londongrammar.com

London Grammar are an English indie pop band formed in Nottingham in 2009. The band consists of Hannah Reid, Dan Rothman, and Dominic "Dot" Major. Their debut extended play, Metal & Dust, was released in 2013 by Metal & Dust Recordings; their debut album, If You Wait (2013), reached No. 2 on the UK Albums Chart and was certified Double Platinum by the British Phonographic Industry (BPI). The band's next two studio albums, Truth Is a Beautiful Thing (2017) and Californian Soil (2021), both reached number 1 on the UK Albums Chart.

== History ==
=== 2009–2012: Early career ===
Vocalist Hannah Reid and guitarist Dan Rothman are originally from London and met in the Ancaster Hall student residence at the University of Nottingham during their first year in 2009. Rothman saw that Reid played the guitar and contacted her to see if she wanted to collaborate. They were joined by Northampton native Dominic "Dot" Major (keyboard, djembe, drums) a year later, after he began playing music together with Rothman. They chose the name as "not only was it where we're from, but London is also so international and multicultural that it actually felt like quite a universal name in a way."

After completing their studies in 2010, the trio moved to London to pursue a career in music. By the end of the year, they were managed by Conor Wheeler, who began promoting them. The band began playing low-key gigs at local bars, honing their material. They soon found themselves noticed by a number of A&R people, and they were signed with the Ministry of Sound while Big Life took over the management duties in the second half of 2013. In the same year, the trio did some early recordings with Rollo Armstrong of Faithless and Liam Howe of Sneaker Pimps. Later in the year, the band continued to work with Tim Bran of Dreadzone and Roy Kerr, and by the end of the year, most of the recording had been completed. On 12 November 2012, the trio posted their song "Hey Now" remixed for Sasha by The Cut on YouTube; it immediately received a huge amount of attention.

=== 2013–2016: If You Wait ===
Their EP Metal & Dust followed in February 2013, and it made the top five of the iTunes chart in Australia. It created a lot of interest, and the band received significant airplay on national radio. They released their single "Wasting My Young Years" in June 2013, peaking at No. 31 on the UK Singles Chart. The band was also featured on Disclosure's album Settle with the track "Help Me Lose My Mind", released in June 2013. The band has recorded two live sessions for Radio 1, and they played at 10 summer 2013 European music festivals. In September 2013, Reid was the subject of a Radio 1 Breakfast Show Twitter post, which was criticised for being sexist. The backlash forced the corporation to apologise, while the trio "decided to stay out of it".

On 1 September 2013, they released "Strong", which peaked at No. 16 on the UK Singles Chart. The song was later used in the 2014 American TV series Reckless for its second episode, "Parting Shots". On 9 September 2013, they released their debut studio album, If You Wait, which peaked at No. 2 on both the UK Albums Chart and Australian Albums Chart, as well as at No. 11 on the French Albums Chart, No. 13 on the Irish Albums Chart and No. 22 on the New Zealand Albums Chart. The band is signed to Columbia Records in the United States. On 8 December 2013, a single for the album, "Nightcall" was released. Their cover was used again in Reckless in its last episode, "Civil Wars Part 2".

On 13 January 2014, the band performed "Strong" and "Wasting My Young Years" on Late Night with Jimmy Fallon, marking their debut performance on American television. On 26 January 2014 the band's rising success in Australia was recognised in Triple J's Hottest 100 countdown for 2013, with "Strong", "Hey Now" and "Wasting My Young Years" placing 10th, 35th and 61st respectively. On 1 April 2014, the Official Charts Company announced that London Grammar's If You Wait was the fifth top-selling album of 2014 so far, with sales of over 138,000 copies (356,000 total). London Grammar won an Ivor Novello Award in the Best Song Musically and Lyrically category for "Strong". And later in 2014, they won two awards – "Independent Breakthrough of the Year" and "PPL Award for Most Played New Independent Act" – at the AIM Independent Music Awards.

On 2 September 2014, French fashion house Dior released an advertisement campaign for J'Adore that featured the song "Hey Now" (The Shoes remix).

After the 2016 acquisition of Ministry of Sound Recordings by Sony Music, London Grammar's catalogue remained to be distributed by Universal Music Group in most of the world and Because Music in France.

=== 2017–2019: Truth Is a Beautiful Thing ===
On 1 January 2017, London Grammar shared the single "Rooting for You", marking the group's first new music since their debut album in 2013. A month later, on 1 February, they shared the second single, "Big Picture", via their Facebook page, which they also performed on Later with Jools Holland.

Truth Is a Beautiful Thing was released on 9 June 2017. The album was largely recorded with producers Paul Epworth and Greg Kurstin. It charted at No. 1 in the UK.

During the autumn of 2017, the band's cover version of the Chris Isaak song "Wicked Game" was used in the trailer for the BBC series Peaky Blinders.

In March 2018, the band's song "Hell to the Liars" from Truth Is a Beautiful Thing was featured on Season 4 of the E! show The Royals in the second episode, "Confess Yourself to Heaven".

In June 2019, London Grammar was featured on "Let You Know", a song by Australian musician Flume.

=== 2020–2023: Californian Soil ===
On 19 August 2020, London Grammar released "Baby It's You", their first single since 2017. This was followed by the premiere of "Californian Soil" on 1 October before the launch of their third album, also titled Californian Soil, which was released on 16 April 2021. "America" was one of the first songs written for the album, and was written about letting go of the past. The launch of "Californian Soil" was accompanied by a full live performance on YouTube. London Grammar were nominated for the "Best Group" at the Brit Awards 2022.

=== 2024–present: The Greatest Love ===
On 19 March 2024, London Grammar teased the release of their fourth album on their Instagram page, showing a white background with a blurred image of a bee. This was confirmed as an album tease by Reid on her personal Instagram (@hannahmayreid) on 20 March 2024, when she posted a photo of her new haircut and baby with the comment "Entering my mum era with bangs and brown hair. Oh and album 4 era".

On 5 April, the first track "House" was released, with the news that their fourth album The Greatest Love would follow later in 2024. A second track from the album called "Kind of Man" was released on 17 May. A third track from the album called "Into Gold" was released on 21 June.

== Musical style ==
London Grammar's music has been described as "a blend of ambient, ethereal and classical sounds" with melancholy guitar, soaring vocals, plaintive lyrics, and often displaying trip-hop and dance influences. Hannah Reid's powerful, haunting vocals – prominent on all of London Grammar's tracks released to date – are often compared to those of Judie Tzuke and Florence Welch. The songs are a collaborative effort, as Reid explains: "I write the lyrics and the top lines. But the songs initiate from all three of us. Dot will write a piano part or a music score. Dan will add some guitars." She describes the songs as "emotionally affected" and said that she "writes about people who come in and out of my life."

== Discography ==
Studio albums

- If You Wait (2013)
- Truth Is a Beautiful Thing (2017)
- Californian Soil (2021)
- The Greatest Love (2024)

== Awards and nominations ==
Year	Awards	Work	Category	Result	Ref.
2013	UK Music Video Awards	"Wasting My Young Years"	Best Visual Effects in a Video	Nominated	
2013	UK Music Video Awards	"Wasting My Young Years"	Best Alternative Video – UK	Won	
2014	UK Music Video Awards	"Nightcall"	Best Alternative Video – UK	Nominated	
2014	UK Music Video Awards	"Nightcall"	Best Cinematography in a Video	Nominated	
2014	UK Music Video Awards	If You Wait	Best Music Ad – TV or Online	Nominated	
2014	UK Music Video Awards	Themselves	Best Video Artist	Nominated	
2014	Brit Awards	Themselves	British Breakthrough Act	Nominated	
2014	Q Awards	Themselves	Best New Act	Nominated	
2014	Ivor Novello Awards	"Strong"	Best Song Musically & Lyrically	Won	
2014	AIM Independent Music Awards	"Strong"	Independent Track of the Year	Nominated	
2014	AIM Independent Music Awards	If You Wait	Independent Album of the Year	Nominated	
2014	AIM Independent Music Awards	Themselves	Best Live Act	Nominated	
2014	AIM Independent Music Awards	Themselves	Independent Breakthrough of the Year	Won	
2014	AIM Independent Music Awards	Themselves	Most Played New Independent Act	Won	
2015	International Dance Music Awards	"Hey Now" (Sasha Remix)	Best House/Garage/Deep House Track	Nominated	
2015	The Music Producers Guild Awards	If You Wait	UK Album of the Year	Nominated	
2017	UK Music Video Awards	"Rooting for You"	Best Live Session	Nominated	
2018	Brit Awards	Themselves	Best British Group	Nominated	
2022	Hungarian Music Awards	Californian Soil	Foreign Alternative or Indie-Rock Album or Recording of the Year	Nominated	
2024	m-v-f- Awards	"Higher" (with CamelPhat)	Direction in an International Music Video	Nominated	
