= Jimmy Edgar discography =

- Studio albums: 5
- EPs: 14+
- Compilation albums: Multiple
- Singles: 10+

The following is the incomplete discography of Jimmy Edgar, including albums, EPs, and singles.

== Discography ==
=== Albums by pseudonym ===
Albums by Jimmy Edgar using a pseudonym
Year	Album title	Release details
2002	My Mines I (as Kristuit Salu and Morris Nightingale)	Released: Feb 2002; Label: Merck Records [merck009]; Format: Digital, CD
2003	%20 (as Michaux)	Released: 2003 (NED); Label: Audio.nl; Format: CD

=== Solo albums ===
Solo albums by Jimmy Edgar, with hidden track listings
Year	Album title	Release details
2006	Color Strip: 1. Pret A Porter; 2. My Beats; 3. I Wanna Be Your STD; 4. LBLB Detroit; 5. Personal Information; 6. Telautraux; 7. Hold It Attach It Connect It; 8. Jefferson Interception; 9. Of The Silent Variety; 10. Semierotiic; 11. Color Strip (Warren); 12. Heart Beat Sexual (Hidden Track); 13. Cadieux + Cass (Bonus Track for Japan)	Released: May 20, 2006; Label: Warp Records; Format: Digital, CD
2010	XXX: 1. Function of Your Love; 2. Hot, Raw, Sex; 3. Turn You Inside Out; 4. New Touch; 5. One Twenty Detail; 6. Rewind, Stop that Tape; 7. Push; 8. Physical Motion; 9. In My Color; 10. Midnite Fone Call; 11. Vibration; 12. Sleep Connexion (Date Rp)	Released: Jul 27, 2010; Label: !K7 Records; Format: Digital, CD (Sep 14, 2010)
2012	Majenta: 1. Too Shy; 2. This One’s For The Children; 3. Sex Drive; 4. Indigo Mechanix (3D); 5. Attempt To Make It Last; 6. Let Yrself Be; 7. Touch Yr Bodytime; 8. Hrt Real Good; 9. I Need Your Control; 10. Heartkey; 11. In Deep; 12. Switch Switch; 13. U Need Love	Released: May 7, 2012; Label: Hotflush; Format: Digital

=== Compilation albums ===
Compilation albums by Jimmy Edgar
Year	Album title	Release details
2015	FabricLive.79	January 15, 2015; Fabric

=== EPs ===
EPs by Jimmy Edgar
Year	Title	Label/date/notes
2001	Seual Dual (as Kristuit Salu)	Isophlux (Jan 8, 2008)
2004	Access Rhythm	Warp (Jan 12, 2004)
2004	Bounce, Make, Model	Warp (Nov 8, 2004)
2006	Rhythmic Denial (1 track)	Warp (Feb 20, 2006)
2007	Color Correction (as X District with Laura Clarke)	Noir Push/Playhouse
2008	I Don't Know (What You're Doing To Me) (as Her Bad Habit)	Citinite (Jul 2008)
2008	Divine Edgar EP (with Richard Devine)	Detroit Underground
2009	Funktion of Your Love E.P.	Items and Things (Sep 2009)
2010	Tell It To The Heart	No.19 Music (Jun 2010)
2010	Hush EP	Glass Table (Jun 2010)
2010	Hot, Raw, Sex Remixes	Studio !K7 (Jul 2010)
2011	New Touch Remixes	Studio !K7 (Jan 2011)
2012	Sex Drive Remixes	Hotflush (Oct 8, 2012)
2012	This One's For The Children	Hotflush
2012	JETS (as Jets with Machinedrum)	Leisure System (Oct 29, 2012)
2013	Hot Inside	Ultramajic (Jun 10, 2013)
2013	Mercurio	Ultramajic (Dec 2, 2013)
2014	White Majic 001 (with Aden)	Ultramajic (Feb 24, 2014)
2014	Saline	Ultramajic (Oct 13, 2014)

=== Singles ===
Selected songs by Jimmy Edgar
Year	Title	Album	Release details
1999	"I Like You"	Single	Poker Flat (GER)
2004	"Inner Citee Color Reprise"	Single	Warp
2006	"My Beats"	Color Strip	Warp (Feb 2006)
2007	"Nothing is Better"	Single	Music video (May 2007)/ Moodgadget (Nov 4, 2008)
2009	"Lips Sealed" (as Noir Friction)	Single	Night Moves (May 5, 2009)
2009	"Private 1/3"	Single	Semantica (Feb 2009)
2010	"Private 2/3"	Single	Semantica (Jan 2010)
2010	"Hot, Raw, Sex"	Single	Studio !K7 (Jul 9, 2010)
2010	"NXTLVLNXTLVL / My Balance (Last Priority)"	Split single	Nonplus (Oct 2010)
2011	'"New Touch"	Single	Studio !K7 (Jan 25, 2011)
2012	"This One's For The Children"	3-track single	Hotflush (Apr 2012)
2012	"Let Yrself Be"	2-track single	Hotflush (Jun 11, 2012)
2012	"Sex Drive"	Single	Hotflush (Aug 10, 2012)

=== Remixes ===
The following is an incomplete list of songs with official remixes released by Jimmy Edgar, in chronological order by remix release:

- 2002: Will Smith - "Miami (Jimmy Edgar Ultra Cut)"
- 2003: Tuesday - "There's No Love in New York City (Remix)"
- 2004: Creepy Autograph - "Signed Yours Truly (Jimmy Edgar Cut Edit)"
- 2007: Jimmy Edgar - "Outer City Sound (Jimmy Edgar Hefty Records Remix)"
- 2007: Yaporigami - "Lie (Jimmy Edgar Remix)"
- 2007: Aaliyah - "Are You That Somebody (Jimmy's Remix)"
- 2008: Black Affair - "Its Real (Jimmy Edgar Remix)"
- 2008: Daedelus - "Touchtone (Jimmy Edgar RMX)"
- 2008: Jimmy Edgar - "Funktion Remix instrumental"
- 2008: Scott Hardkiss - "Hey Deejay! (Jimmy Edgar Remix)"
- 2009: X District - "Color Correction (Jimmy Edgar LTNT RMX)"
- 2009: Purple Crush "Get Digital (Jimmy Edgar Remix)"
- 2009: Silverclub - "Crash this Car (Jimmy Edgar Remix)"
- 2009: Fulgeance - "Ann Arbor (Jimmy E Rmx)"
- 2009: Kris Wadsworth - "Mainline (Jimmy E Remix)"
- 2009: Aux 88 - "Mad Scientist (Jimmy Edgar REMIX)"
- 2009: Machinedrum feat. Theophilus London - "Late Night Operation (Jimmy Edgar Remix)"
- 2009: Kathy Diamond - "Fire (Jimmy Edgar RMX)"
- 2009: Bitcode - "For Trash (Jimmy Edgar RMX)"
- 2009: Michael Jackson - "Billie Jean (Jimmy Edgar Club Mix)"
- 2010: Jimmy Edgar - "Hot, Raw, Sex (Extension)"
- 2010: Ghost Hunter - "Island Barbados (Jimmy Edgar Remix)"
- 2010: The-Dream - "Panties on the Side (Jimmy Edgar RMX)"
- 2010: Jimmy Edgar - "New Touch (Hard Makeover)"
- 2010: Jimmy Edgar - "New Touch (Cut Tap Disco MX)"
- 2010: Native Underground - "Night Vision (Jimmy Edgar Redo)"
- 2011: Tahiti 80 - "Darlin (Adam & Eve Song, Jimmy Edgar Remix)"
- 2011: DJ T - "Nothing Even Comes Close (JIMMY EDGAR LH RMX)"
- 2011: Amon Tobin - "Mass Spring (Jimmy Edgar Remix)"
- 2011: Amon Tobin - "Drop From The Sky (Jimmy Edgar Manipulation)"
- 2011: INOJ - "Love U Down (Jimmy Edgar's Lip Kiss)"
- 2011: New Look - "The Ballad (Jimmy Edgar Makeover)"
- 2011: Jimmy Edgar - "Ladyphysix (Change "Lovely Lady" / Dopplereffekt "Infophysix" Mashup)
- 2011: Native Underground - "Night Vision (Jimmy Edgar Remix)"
- 2011: Sepalcure - "Everyday of my Life (Jimmy Edgar Re-Mix)"
- 2011: INC. - "Millionaires (Jimmy Edgar Fxck Money Mix)"
- 2011: Creep - "You featuring Nina Sky (Jimmy Edgar Club Mix)"
- 2011: Theophilus London - "Why Even Try aka W.E.T. (Jimmy Edgars Modular Disco)"
- 2011: Emika - "3 Hours/Hit Me (Jimmy Edgar Remix/Music Video)"
- 2011: Bitcode - "Bark (Jimmy Edgar Remix)"
- 2011: NyteOwl - "Love U (Jimmy Edgar Pantone Color)"
- 2011: Royalty - "Cookie Dough (Jimmy Edgar's Cookie Monster)"
- 2011: DJ T - "Nothing Even Comes Close (Jimmy Edgar Remix)"
- 2011: Filterwolf - "Brooklyn via Montmartre (Jimmy Edgar Edit)"
- 2011: Jimmy Edgar - "Hot, Raw, Sex (Hot Sharp Touch, for Collette Sex Compilation, FR)"
- 2011: Paul Thomas - and Funkagenda "Gornal (Jimmy Edgar Remix)"
- 2012: Marius - "Checkered Flag (Jimmy Edgar Remix)"
- 2012: Deft - "Clotting (Jimmy Edgar Makeover)"
- 2012: Big Black Delta - "IFUCKINGLOVEYOU (Jimmy Edgar Remix)"
- 2012: Strip Steve - "One Thing (Jimmy Edgar Remix)"
- 2012: Astroboyz - "Pianobatacazoo (Jimmy Edgar Manicure Rmx)"
- 2012: Triumph - "Discover (Jimmy Edgar Remix)"
- 2012: Amon Tobin - "Dropped From The Sky (Jimmy Edgar Nails Did)"
- 2012: Foals - "Every Day Of My Life (Jimmy Edgar Remix)"
- 2013: Body Language - "Lose My Head (Jimmy Edgar Remix)"
- 2013: Jesse Perez and Jimmy Edgar - "Interracial Booty Calls (Jimmy Edgar Remix)"
- 2013: Kris Wadsworth - "It's Time (Jimmy Edgar Remix)"
- 2013: Alba - "Knokke (Jimmy Edgar Remix)"
- 2013: Jamie Lidell - "You Naked (Jimmy Edgar Remix)"
- 2013: Jamie Lidell - "Big Love (Jimmy Edgar Shout Edit)"
- 2013: Nadia Ksaiba - "Virtual Lover (Jimmy Edgar Remix)"
- 2013: Boys Noize - "What You Want (Jimmy Edgar Remix)"
- 2013: Letherette - "Restless (Jimmy Edgar Remix)"
- 2013: Bumper - "Get Into Position (Jimmy Edgar Remix)"
- 2013: Strip Steve - "One Thing (Jimmy Edgar Remix)"
- 2013: Boys Noize - "What You Want (Jimmy Edgar Dub Mix)"
- 2014: Pompeya - "Power (Jimmy Edgar Remix)"
- 2014: Danny Daze - "Beatdown (Jimmy Edgar Remix)"
- 2014: Claude VonStroke - "Lay It Down Re-Smoked (Jimmy Edgar Remix)"
- 2014: Heidi - "Smoked (Jimmy Edgar Remix)"
- 2014: Aden - "Whip (Jimmy Edgar Remix)"
- 2014: Katy B / Skream / Headhunter - "Rollercoaster (Jimmy Edgar Remix)"
- 2014: Yousef and The Angel - "Float Away (Jimmy Edgar Remix)"
- 2014: Monsieur Monsieur - "Lucid (Jimmy Edgar Remix)"

== See also ==
- Jimmy Edgar
