= Annie Hart (musician) =

American singer-songwriter

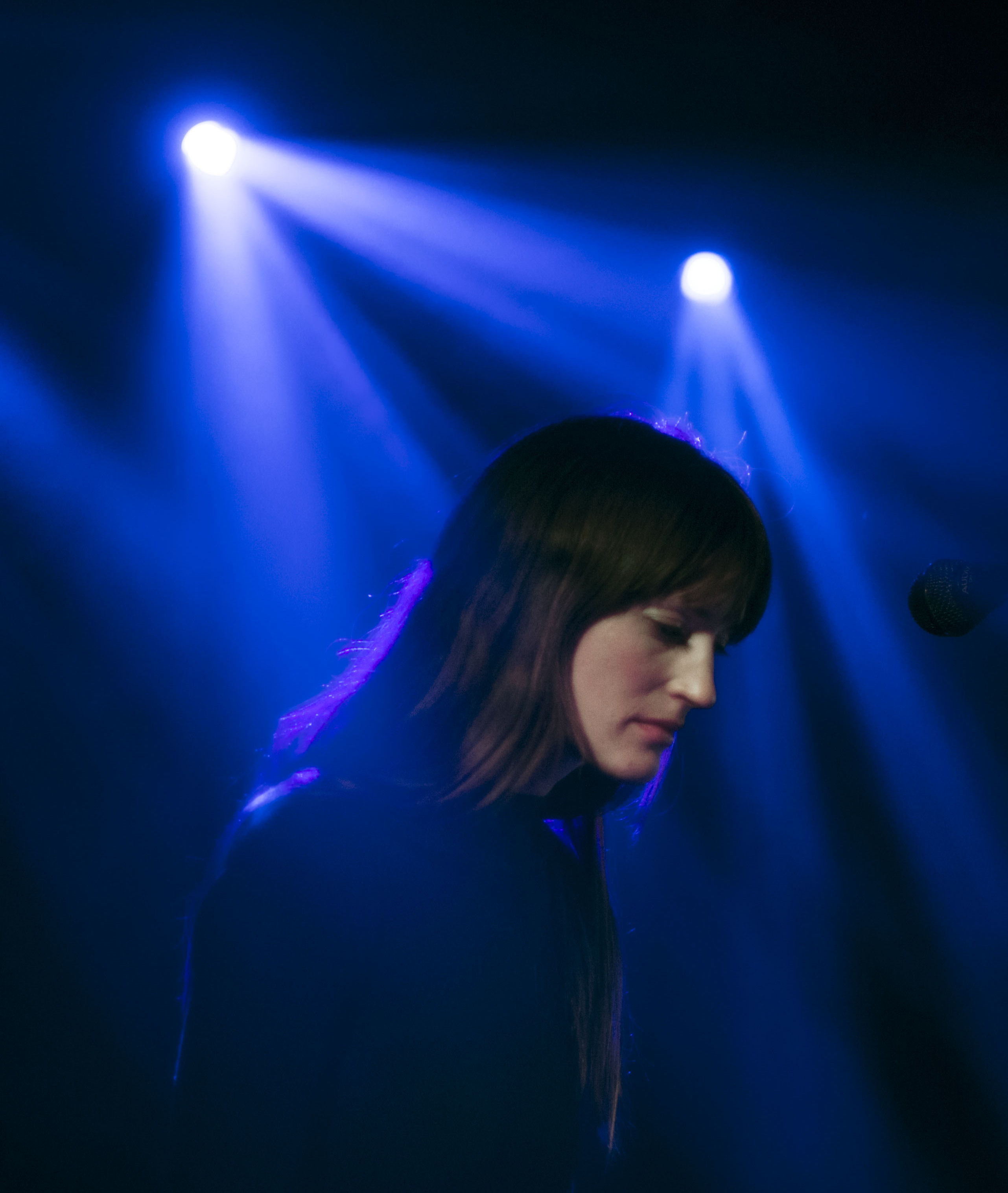
- Annie Hart, 2016

Background information
- Origin: Brooklyn, New York
- Genres: Synth-pop
- Years active: 2003–present
- Labels: Instant Records, Uninhabitable Mansions, Our Secret Record Company, EMI, Moshi Moshi
- Website: www.anniehart.nyc

Annie Hart is an American film singer-songwriter and composer. She primarily composes and performs in the band Au Revoir Simone. In 2017, she released a solo album entitled Impossible Accomplice. She has contributed vocals to other artists' projects and appeared on the 2017 series of Twin Peaks. She has composed and performed the score of Banana Split (2018) and, along with Jay Wadley, Olympic Dreams (2020).

== History ==
Hart was born on Long Island, New York, and is one of three founding members of synth-pop group Au Revoir Simone. She has been in other groups including Uninhabitable Mansions, featuring members of Clap Your Hands Say Yeah, and collaborated as a composer with French band Air for their soundtrack to Les Voyages Dans La Lune. In 2017, she began releasing music under her own name apart from Au Revoir Simone and embarked on a world tour.

She has appeared on screen along with the other members of Au Revoir Simone in Episodes 4 and 9 of the 2017 series of Twin Peaks. Her song "Hard To Be Still" appeared on episode one of the Netflix series Gypsy, starring Naomi Watts.

== Musical style ==
Hart's music is considered minimal synth-pop, which New York magazine's Bedford and Bowery describes as "resonant, tender, and not too sweet". She primarily composes on electric piano and vintage synthesizers.

== Discography ==
=== with Au Revoir Simone ===
- 2005: Verses of Comfort, Assurance & Salvation (Europe: Moshi Moshi Records, North America: Our Secret Record Company, Japan: Rallye Record Label)
- 2007: The Bird of Music (Europe: Moshi Moshi Records, North America: Our Secret Record Company, Japan: Rallye Record Label)
- 2009: Still Night, Still Light (North America: Our Secret Record Company)
- 2013: Move in Spectrums (Europe: Moshi Moshi Records, North America: Instant Records)

=== with Uninhabitable Mansions ===
- 2009: We Misplaced a Cobra in the Uninhabitable Mansion 7-inch single
- 2009: Nature is a Taker LP

=== with Jeffrey Lewis ===
- 2011: A Turn In The Dream Songs "Reaching" (Rough Trade)

=== with Air ===
- 2011: Le Voyage Dans La Lune "Who Am I Now?" (EMI)

=== Solo ===
- 2017: Impossible Accomplice (Instant Records)
- 2019: A Softer Offering
- 2021: Everything Pale Blue (Orindal Records)
- 2023: The Weight of A Wave
