= FabricLive.78 =

Compilation album by Illum Sphere
- Released: 17 November 2014
- Genre: Electronic
- Length: 1:09:54
- Label: Fabric

FabricLive chronology
FabricLive.77 (2014)	FabricLive.78 (2014)	FabricLive.79 (2015)

Illum Sphere chronology
The Ghosts of Then and Now (2014)	FabricLive.78 (2014)

Professional ratings
Review scores
Source	Rating
AllMusic	4/5 stars

FabricLive.78 is a DJ mix album by the electronic band Illum Sphere. It was released in 2014 as part of the FabricLive Mix Series.

== Track listing ==
No.	Title	Length
1.	"Sein Und Scheun" (featuring E.M.A.K.)	3:18
2.	"Now You're Gone" (featuring Soul Syndicate)	1:47
3.	"Dungeness" (featuring Tapes)	2:20
4.	"Fizz" (featuring Powell)	3:22
5.	"Danger [Version]" (featuring Carl Meeks)	2:23
6.	"Sein und Schein" (featuring E.M.A.K.)	0:45
7.	"Harry Batasuna" (featuring Musumeci)	3:16
8.	"Ooze" (featuring Streetwalker)	3:40
9.	"Film 2 (33 RPM)" (featuring Grauzone)	2:16
10.	"H.S.T.A." (featuring Das Ding)	2:40
11.	"Speechless Tape" (featuring NGLY)	3:07
12.	"Bout Ready to Jak [TNT's Acid Mix]" (featuring Osborne)	2:41
13.	"Who Raised These People?" (featuring Charles Manier)	3:08
14.	"On the Tiger Train" (featuring Legowelt)	2:34
15.	"Workship 19 (B3)" (featuring Kassem Mosse)	2:15
16.	"Repository of Light" (featuring Demdike Stare)	2:44
17.	"Oochie Coo" (featuring James T. Cotton)	4:18
18.	"Pump the Move (Kenny Larkin Mix)" (featuring E-Dancer)	3:00
19.	"Desolate Cities" (featuring 2AM)	3:21
20.	"Thought, Pt. 1" (featuring Propaganda)	1:46
21.	"Gershwin" (featuring Actress)	3:15
22.	"Bullet"	3:53
23.	"Cast Reflections" (featuring Vazz)	2:41
24.	"What's There Left" (featuring Nine Circles)	5:24
