= FabricLive.79 =

Compilation album by Jimmy Edgar
- Released: 15 January 2015
- Genre: Electronic
- Length: 1:12:39
- Label: Fabric

FabricLive chronology
FabricLive.78 (2014)	FabricLive.79 (2015)	FabricLive.80 (2015)

Jimmy Edgar chronology
Majenta (2012)	FabricLive.79 (2015)

Professional ratings
Review scores
Source	Rating
Resident Advisor	3/5 stars

FabricLive.79 is a 2015 DJ mix album by Jimmy Edgar. The album was released as part of the FabricLive Mix Series.

== Track listing ==
No.	Title	Length
1.	"The Electric" (featuring Terrence Dixon)	1:49
2.	"Power Top" (featuring Matrixxman, Vin Sol, Pol Style)	4:10
3.	"Raw Fusion/Hard Drive" (featuring Patrice Scott)	3:39
4.	"Let It All Out" (featuring L-Vis 1990, Crystal Bandito)	3:40
5.	"Submission" (featuring Crystal Bandito, Truncate)	3:54
6.	"Tik Tok" (featuring Truncate)	4:30
7.	"Eeewalk" (featuring Crystal Bandito)	3:41
8.	"RS2000" (featuring Crystal Bandito)	3:57
9.	"Work It" (featuring Crystal Bandito)	4:13
10.	"Fern Portal" (featuring Crystal Bandito)	5:01
11.	"Walk Show" (featuring DJ Rashad)	3:57
12.	"Feel So Free" (featuring Crystal Bandito, DJ Rashad)	4:14
13.	"Ready2go" (featuring Crystal Bandito, Danny Daze)	3:18
14.	"Another Freaks" (featuring Danny Daze, DJ Godfather, DJ Starski)	2:15
15.	"Be With Me" (featuring Crystal Bandito, DJ Godfather, DJ Starski)	5:42
16.	"Uranus 444 (Side A)" (featuring Crystal Bandito, Kris Wadsworth)	3:11
17.	"Atlantiz" (featuring Kris Wadsworth)	5:51
18.	"Uranus 333 (Side B)" (featuring Kris Wadsworth)	5:37
