= Jump in the Pool =

Single by Friendly Fires

from the album Friendly Fires
- Released: 1 September 2008; 18 May 2009 (UK re-release)
- Genre: Shoegaze; dance-punk; synthpop
- Length: 3:37
- Label: XL Recordings
- Songwriters: Ed Macfarlane, Jack Savidge, Edd Gibson, Paul Epworth

Friendly Fires singles chronology
"On Board" (2007)	"Jump in the Pool" (2008)	"Paris" (2008)

"Jump in the Pool" is the second single by Friendly Fires taken from the band's self-titled debut album Friendly Fires. It was first made available as a single on iTunes on 1 September 2008, the same day the album was released, along with a promotional video. There was also a hand numbered, one sided white label 7" (limited to 250 copies). It was released as a 12" vinyl and a download EP on 18 May 2009. It is the theme tune to the BBC's Final Score for the 2009/10 Football Season. Australian singer LENKA also recorded a cover for BBC Radio 1's Live Lounge, which was then put on the album "Live Lounge 4". The song has been used in the introduction for BBC's Final Score football program. It was number 87 on Rolling Stone's list of the 100 Best Songs of 2008.

== Track listing ==
7" vinyl/Download single

1. "Jump in the Pool" – 3:37

Download EP

1. "Jump in the Pool" – 3:37
2. "Jump in the Pool" (Thin White Duke Remix) – 7:04
3. "Jump in the Pool" (Wild Geese Remix) – 6:12

12" vinyl

1. "Jump in the Pool" (Thin White Duke Remix) – 7:04
2. "Jump in the Pool" (Wild Geese Remix) – 6:12

== Charts ==
After release on 12" vinyl and as a download EP, and with BBC Radio 1 playing it, the song entered the UK Singles Chart in May 2009 at No. 70 and peaked at No. 57.

Chart (2009)	Peak position
UK Indie (OCC)	7
UK Singles (The Official Charts Company)	57
