= Skeleton Boy =

Single by Friendly Fires

from the album Friendly Fires
- Released: 2 March 2009
- Genre: Shoegaze; dance-punk; synth-pop
- Length: 4:05
- Label: XL Recordings
- Songwriters: Ed Macfarlane, Jack Savidge, Edd Gibson

Friendly Fires singles chronology
"Paris" (2008)	"Skeleton Boy" (2009)	"Kiss of Life" (2009)

"Skeleton Boy" is the third single by Friendly Fires taken from the band's self-titled debut album Friendly Fires. It was released on 2 March 2009 in the UK and 1 March 2009 in the United States. This version of the song was produced by Paul Epworth and was used in the promotional video for the song. This version is different from the version on the album that was produced by singer Ed Macfarlane, in that it is 30 seconds longer than the original version and features an extended instrumental bridge.

The song is featured on the soundtrack of NHL 2K10 and NBA 2K12. The song reappeared in NBA 2K16.

== Track listing ==
- "12" Vinyl Release
1. "Skeleton Boy" (Zio's Stellar Extended Remix) - 9:18
2. "Skeleton Boy" (Air France Remix) - 4:59
- Digital Download
1. "Skeleton Boy" - 4:05
2. "Skeleton Boy" (Zio's Stellar Extended Remix) - 9:18
3. "Skeleton Boy" (Air France Remix) - 4:59

== Charts ==
Chart (2009)	Peak position
UK Singles Chart	48
