= Au Revoir Simone =

American indie pop band

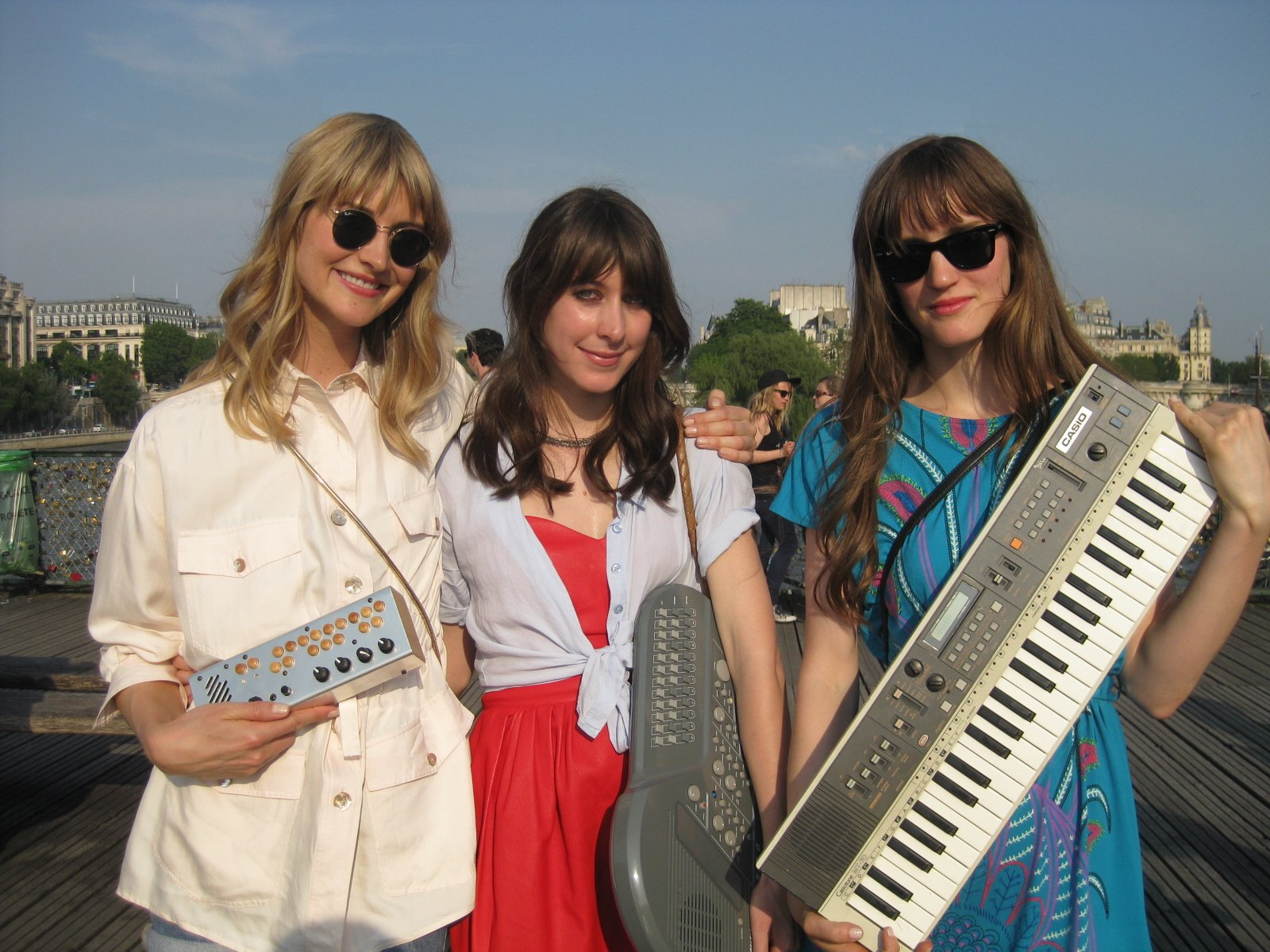
- Au Revoir Simone in Paris (2012)

Background information
- Origin: Brooklyn, New York, U.S.
- Genres: Indie pop; dream pop; synth-pop
- Years active: 2003–present
- Labels: Our Secret; Moshi Moshi; Rallye Label; Instant
- Members: Heather D'Angelo; Erika Forster; Annie Hart
- Past members: Sung Bin Park
- Website: aurevoirsimone.com

Au Revoir Simone is an American indie pop band from Williamsburg, Brooklyn, New York, formed in 2003. The group is composed of Erika Forster (vocals/keyboard), Annie Hart (vocals/keyboard/bass) and Heather D'Angelo (vocals/drum machine/keyboard).

== Background ==
The band's name comes from a line Pee-wee Herman says to a minor character (named Simone) in Tim Burton's 1985 film Pee-wee's Big Adventure. The group's musical inspirations were compared by the band's European label, Moshi Moshi Records, to "a dutifully mined musical thrift store"; these diverse influences include Modest Mouse, Stereolab, the Mountain Goats, Louis Prima, Pavement, the Beach Boys, Björk, Broadcast, Belle & Sebastian, David Bowie, Bee Gees and Billie Holiday. Ben Opipari of The Washington Post described OMD, Eurythmics, M83 and Frankie Rose as Au Revoir Simone's musical "kindred spirits".

== History ==
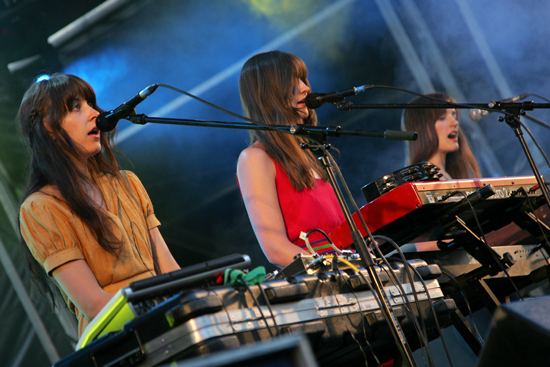
Au Revoir Simone performing in 2008.

Au Revoir Simone formed in late 2003 when Forster (formerly of Dirty on Purpose) and Hart met on a train ride home to New York from Vermont and decided to form an all-keyboard band. They were soon joined at practices by D'Angelo and a fourth member, Sung Bin Park (keyboard/vocals). In December 2004, Park left the band.

Their debut album, Verses of Comfort, Assurance & Salvation, was released on March 23, 2005 on the band's own Our Secret Record Company label; it was subsequently issued in Europe on October 31 by Moshi Moshi Records, and later by the Rallye Label in Japan. Pitchfork reviewer Brian Howe said that the album's "synth-pop is always simple, elegant, and ethereal". The band described the album as akin to "exploring a secret garden at night with a flashlight".

In summer 2006, the trio toured the US, Canada and Europe with We Are Scientists.

On March 5, 2007, they released their second album, The Bird of Music, promoted by a US tour with Peter Bjorn and John and Voxtrot from April through June. British Vogue said of the album, “Eschewing the typical guitar-heavy band set-up for old-school synthesizers and vintage drum machines, [Au Revoir Simone] create dreamy synth-pop. Their soft ethereal vocals laid over spare homemade drumbeats are reminiscent of Air and Stereolab". Spin said, "Powered by vintage keyboards, a lockstep beat-box, and gorgeous, wide-eyed warbling, the Simones create make-out music for your inner android".

On May 21, 2007, they played a concert at Fondation Cartier in Paris for David Lynch's retrospective exhibition. The stage they performed on was a recreation of the set from his film Eraserhead. Au Revoir Simone played at both the Treasure Island Music Festival and Monolith Festival in September 2007. In October 2007, they contributed a T-shirt design to raise money for Transportation Alternatives.

In March 2008, the band appeared on eTown, a Boulder, Colorado-based radio program co-hosted by Nick Forster, father of band member Erika Forster.

In November 2008, vocals by Au Revoir Simone were used in both the original and the Aeroplane remix of Friendly Fires track "Paris".

Their third album, Still Night, Still Light, was produced by Thom Monahan and released on May 19, 2009. Pitchfork called it "feather-light electropop that's not to be taken lightly".

In July 2009, they performed at that year's Lovebox Festival in Victoria Park, London. At the end of 2009, the group embarked on their own headlining tour of Japan.

In 2010, they created one of the first interactive music videos for their song "Knight of Wands". In true coloring book style, the video allows viewers to become a part of the creative process.

After a long hiatus, Au Revoir Simone reunited to release their fourth album, Move in Spectrums on September 24, 2013 on Richard Gottehrer's revived Instant Records label. AllMusic said it was "maybe their best record yet" and "certainly their most sophisticated and most arranged work".

On June 23, 2015, they released the "Red Rabbit" digital single on Instant Records.

== Other projects ==
In early 2015, Forster formed Summer Moon with Lewis Lazar, Tennessee Thomas (the Like) and Nikolai Fraiture (the Strokes).

In 2016, Forster and Thomas formed Nice as Fuck with Jenny Lewis (from Rilo Kiley), and released their first album on June 24.

In 2017, Hart released a solo album entitled Impossible Accomplice.

== In popular culture ==
"Sad Song" was used in the 2007 German blockbuster movie Rabbit Without Ears and later on the soundtrack of the 2011 movie From Prada to Nada. Also in 2007, their song "Stay Golden" appeared in the French film Anna M.. "The Lucky One" and "Don't See the Sorrow" were heard in the 2008 Japanese film Kimi no Tomodachi (English: Your Friends). In 2009, "Another Likely Story" was used on the 100th episode ("What a Difference a Day Makes") of Grey's Anatomy.

"Stay Golden" and "Red Rabbit" were featured in HBO's 2012 Marilyn Monroe documentary Love, Marilyn, while "Crazy" was used in the 2014 film Vampire Academy and its soundtrack.

Au Revoir Simone was among the bands performing at the Roadhouse in the 2017 revival of David Lynch's Twin Peaks; they played "Lark" in the fourth episode and "A Violent Yet Flammable World" in the ninth, both from their 2007 album The Bird of Music.

In 2021, the band appeared on the Storyboard podcast with author Tamara Winfrey Harris.

In 2023, the band's song "All or Nothing" appeared in the Roku show Slip (S1E2).

== Discography ==
=== Studio albums ===
- Verses of Comfort, Assurance & Salvation (2005, Our Secret Record Company North America, Moshi Moshi Records Europe, Rallye Label Japan)
- The Bird of Music (2007, Our Secret Record Company North America, Moshi Moshi Records Europe, Rallye Label Japan)
- Still Night, Still Light (2009, Our Secret Record Company North America)
- Move in Spectrums (2013, Instant Records North America, Moshi Moshi Records Europe)

=== Singles and EPs ===
- "Hurricanes" CD single (2005, Rallye Label Japan)
- "Through the Backyards" 7" single (2006, Moshi Moshi Records UK)
- "Fallen Snow" 7" single (2007, Moshi Moshi Records UK)
- "Sad Song" 7" single (2007, Moshi Moshi Records UK)
- "Summer Lines" 7" single (2008, Elefant Records Spain)
- "Shadows" 7" single (2009, Moshi Moshi Records UK)
- Tour Remixes CD EP (2009, Rallye Label Japan)
- "Shadows (The Teenagers Remix)" digital single (2009, RCRD LBL)
- "Organized Scenery" digital single (2010, self-released)
- "Tell Me" 7" single (2010, Keys of Life Finland)
- "Crazy" 7" single (2013, Moshi Moshi Records UK)
- "Somebody Who" digital single (2013, Moshi Moshi Records France)
- "Red Rabbit" digital single (2015, Instant Records)

=== Remix albums ===
- Reverse Migration (2008, Our Secret Record Company North America)
- Night Light (2010, Moshi Moshi Records Europe)
- Spectrums (2014, Moshi Moshi Records Europe)

=== Guest appearances ===
- Vocals on "Star Guitar" on The One album by Shinichi Osawa (2007, RZN)
- Vocals on "Paris" (Aeroplane Remix) by Friendly Fires (2008, XL Recordings)
- "Paganini Rocks" 12" EP by Robortom Featuring Au Revoir Simone (2010, Sunday Best Recordings)
- "Who Am I Now" on the Le voyage dans la lune album by Air (2012, EMI)
- "Rise Early Morning" digital single by Nervo Featuring Au Revoir Simone (2014, Ultra Records)
- Les Chansons de l'innocence by French singer Etienne Daho on the almost namesake album Les Chansons de l'innocence retrouvée (2014, Universal Music Group)
