= NBA 2K12 =

2011 basketball video game

- The Michael Jordan version of NBA 2K12's cover
- Developer: Visual Concepts
- Publisher: 2K
- Series: NBA 2K
- Platforms: Microsoft Windows; PlayStation 2 PlayStation 3 PlayStation Portable; Wii; Xbox 360 iOS
- Release: NA: October 4, 2011; PAL: October 7, 2011; JP: October 20, 2011
- Genre: Sports
- Modes: Single-player, multiplayer

NBA 2K12 is a 2011 basketball simulation video game developed by Visual Concepts and published by 2K. It was released in October 2011 for Microsoft Windows, PlayStation 2, PlayStation 3, PlayStation Portable, Wii, Xbox 360, and, for the first time, iOS. As the thirteenth installment in the NBA 2K series, it is the successor to NBA 2K11 and the predecessor to NBA 2K13. For the first time in the series, three different covers are available; the three cover athletes are Michael Jordan (who was also the cover athlete for the previous game) for the Chicago Bulls, Magic Johnson of the Los Angeles Lakers, and Larry Bird of the Boston Celtics. This was the last installment in the series to be released for the PlayStation 2.

NBA 2K12, like the other games in the series, strives to emulate the experience of the National Basketball Association. Players mainly play NBA basketball games in a variety of game modes with real and customizable players and teams. MyPlayer mode is one of the modes; in it, players create their own player and play through their career in the NBA. A mode called Association is also present, in which the player assumes control of an NBA organization, and simulates through seasons. A mode focusing on past NBA players is introduced, and several online modes are present.

In September 2011, prior to the game's release, a demo was released for PlayStation Network and Xbox Live. The game features a licensed soundtrack consisting of 28 songs. A contest was held before the game's release, the winners of which would collaborate on an original song to be featured in the game.

NBA 2K12 received positive reviews from critics upon release, with praise directed at the visuals, wealth of content, controls, and overall gameplay. By April 2012, the game had sold over four million copies worldwide.

== Gameplay ==
NBA 2K12 is a basketball simulation game which strives to emulate the National Basketball Association. Players mostly play NBA basketball games with real or created players and teams. The game features several aesthetical details found in real televised NBA games, such as commentary from Kevin Harlan, Clark Kellogg, and Steve Kerr, sideline reports from Doris Burke, halftime shows, replays, customizable camera angles, and other details.

Along with standard online and quick play game modes, several other game modes are present. Association mode allows the player to assume control of an entire NBA organization, simulating through NBA seasons, managing personnel, and participating in off-season activities, such as the draft and free agency. MyPlayer mode returns, in which the player creates their own basketball player. The player customizes the appearance, animations, and other aspects of their player, and plays through their basketball career, upgrading their attributes.

One of the game's most-touted features is the "NBA's Greatest" mode. The mode centers on past NBA teams and players, and allows the player to recreate historically significant moments. The mode features such teams as the 1986–87 Los Angeles Lakers, with Magic Johnson, Kareem Abdul-Jabbar, and others, the 1995–96 Chicago Bulls, led by Michael Jordan, and the 1984–85 Philadelphia 76ers, featuring Julius Erving and Moses Malone. The teams and players can be used outside the "NBA's Greatest" mode. Another mode is "Create a Legend"; similar to the MyPlayer mode, it allows the player to play through the entire career of a real player, instead of a customizable player. The player can play with their selected player on any team and will start as a rookie.

== Development and release ==
NBA 2K12 was released in October 2011 for the Microsoft Windows, PlayStation 2, PlayStation 3, PlayStation Portable, Wii, Xbox 360, and, for the first time, iOS. It was developed by Visual Concepts and published by 2K Sports, a subsidiary of Take-Two Interactive. The first trailer for the game was released in June 2011. Several other trailers were released in the months leading up to the game's release. A demo of the game was released in September 2011 for PlayStation Network and Xbox Live. Three different covers are available for the game. A first for the series, the three cover athletes are Michael Jordan, Magic Johnson, and Larry Bird.

NBA 2K12 was featured at the 2011 Electronic Entertainment Expo, with Kobe Bryant making an appearance. Duck Down Music and 2K Sports hosted a competition for a song placement on the official game soundtrack. After filtering thousands of entries down to ten, producer Alex Kresovich and rap group D.J.I.G. were named the winners. D.J.I.G.'s "Now's My Time" and Kresovich's "The Return" both appeared on the official soundtrack. The complete soundtrack consists of 28 licensed songs.

Because of the 2011 NBA lockout, rookies taken in the 2011 NBA draft were not originally in the game. After the lockout was resolved, they appeared in downloadable rosters.

== Soundtrack ==
- Eminem, Royce Da 5'9" - Fast Lane
- Travis Barker - Let's Go feat. Yelawolf, Twista, Busta Rhymes, Lil' Jon
- CyHi Da Prynce - Sideways (2K Remix)
- Kurtis Blow - Basketball
- Friendly Fires - Skeleton Boy
- Machinedrum - Let It (edIT Remix)
- Aceyalone - Workin' Man's Blues feat. Cee-Lo Green
- Freddie Gibbs - Look Easy (2K Original)
- Chiddy Bang - Here We Go feat. Q-Tip
- Zion I - Many Stylez feat. Rebelution
- Duck Down All Stars - Shout the Winners Out
- Middle Class Rut - New Low
- Bassnectar - Cozza Frenzy
- Ancient Astronauts - Still a Soldier
- Alex K., D.J.I.G. - Now's My Time (2K Original)
- See-I - Haterz
- James Pants - We're Through
- Shinobi Ninja - Rock Hood
- DELS - Shapeshift
- Hudson Mohawke - Thunder Bay (Instrumental)
- Mr. Chop - Intermezzo 2 (Instrumental)
- Kid Mac - Hear You Calling feat. Mat McHugh
- Thunderball - Make Your Move
- The Freeze Tag - The Shuffle (Instrumental)
- The Death Set - It's Another Day
- Project Lionheart - They Come Back
- Jamaica - By the Numbers
- XV - Awesome feat. Pusha T

== Reception ==
Reception

Aggregate score
Aggregator	Score
Metacritic	(PC) 86/100 (PS3) 90/100 (X360) 90/100 (iOS) 68/100

Review scores
Publication	Score
Game Informer	9.5/10
GameSpot	8.5/10
GamesRadar+	5/5
Giant Bomb	5/5
IGN	9.5/10
Nintendo World Report	8.5/10
Pocket Gamer	(iOS) 2/5
Push Square	9/10
TouchArcade	(iOS) 3.5/5

According to the review aggregation website Metacritic, the Microsoft Windows version of NBA 2K12 received "generally favorable" reviews from critics upon release, while the PlayStation 3 and Xbox 360 versions received "universal acclaim". The iOS port, by contrast, received "mixed or average" reviews. The PlayStation 2, PlayStation Portable, and Nintendo Wii versions of the game do not hold an aggregated score on the website, due to a lack of reviews.

Matt Bertz of Game Informer called NBA 2K12 the "best basketball sim ever". He praised the introduction of more classic teams and players, commended the control tweaks and tutorial options, called the overall presentation and player models the "best in sports games", and called the commentary the "best ever recorded in a sports game".

GameSpot's Tom Mc Shea commended the tweaks made to the MyPlayer mode for allowing it to be "immediately engaging", praised the "amazing" and "lifelike" presentation, and liked the addition of more historic players and teams.

Richard Grisham from GamesRadar wrote: "Suffice to say, there are a few quirks that mean it's not 'perfect', including some painfully long load times, repetitive commentary when you get further into My Player or have to repeat historic matchups [...], or questionable decisions around DLC and the removal of the Crew mode. Even so, the combination of sublime gameplay, unprecedented level of compelling historic team matchups, and an excellent update to My Player puts NBA 2K12 at a level no hoops game has ever been. The absolute mountaintop."

Jack Devries for IGN wrote: "No sports game has ever made me this excited to play. Seriously it's all I've been able to think about for the last week. The realistic, challenging, gorgeously animated gameplay carries across a cornucopia of modes. Playing legends of the past, the stars of today, and my own personal NBA rookie are all different flavors of f#$%ing rad. Any one of these modes would be reason enough to purchase the game, but all of them together make for a game that any basketball fan has to pick up."

During the 15th Annual Interactive Achievement Awards, the Academy of Interactive Arts & Sciences nominated NBA 2K12 for "Sports Game of the Year".

By April 2012, the game had sold over four million copies worldwide.
