= Kiss of Life (Friendly Fires song) =

Single by Friendly Fires

from the album Friendly Fires
- Released: 11 August 2009
- Recorded: 2009
- Genre: Dance-punk; tribal house; synthpop
- Length: 4:07
- Label: XL Recordings
- Songwriters: Ed Macfarlane, Jack Savidge, Edd Gibson, Paul Epworth

Friendly Fires singles chronology
"Skeleton Boy" (2009)	"Kiss of Life" (2009)	"Live Those Days Tonight" (2011)

"Kiss of Life" is a single by Friendly Fires, released on 11 August 2009. The song premiered on Zane Lowe's BBC Radio 1 show as his "Hottest Record in the World" on 13 July 2009 and is the first single taken from the band's deluxe, re-released version of their self-titled debut album Friendly Fires, released 31 August 2009.

A related remix EP was released on 30 August 2009, in The UK and other European countries. The remixes have not been released in any North American countries. On the deluxe, re-released edition of the self-titled album, Friendly Fires, a live performance was released, along with the music video. The live performance is only available on the CD/DVD release, not on the digital download release. To hype up the release of Kiss of Life, the band, on their website, released a preview of the music video before it aired on TV, plus "behind the scenes" videos of making the single, and the music video. The accompanying video premiered on Channel 4 on 23 July 2009, was shot in Ibiza, and directed by Chris Cottam.

The song has been used in more movies and TV shows than any other single the band released. Most recently, the song was featured on an episode of Melrose Place on 20 October 2009, in the United States. "Kiss of Life" has had more exposure to the public than their previous singles, making it one of Friendly Fires' more popular releases.

== Track listing ==
- US Digital Download Single
1. "Kiss of Life" (Album Version) - 4:10
- UK & Canada Remix EP
1. "Kiss of Life" (Luke Solomon's Broken Dreams and Tambourines Vocal) - 8:47
2. "Kiss of Life" (Luke Solomon's Broken Dub) - 6:15
- Sweden, Germany & France Remix Single
1. "Kiss of Life" (Luke Solomon's Broken Dreams and Tambourines Vocal) - 8:47
2. "Kiss of Life" (Luke Solomon's Broken Dub) - 6:15

== Music video ==
The band dancing and singing on a beach in the music video for "Kiss Of Life".

Year	Title	Length	Director
2009	"Kiss of Life"	4:08	Chris Cottam

== Charts ==
Chart (2009)	Peak position
UK Indie (Official Charts)	19
UK Singles (Official Charts)	30
