= Aeroplane (musician) =

Belgian nu disco music producer and DJ

- Born: Vito de Luca; 1982 (age 43–44); Auvelais, Belgium
- Genres: Nu disco; balearic house; house
- Years active: 2007–present
- Labels: Eskimo recordings; Aeropop
- Members: Vito de Luca
- Past members: Stephen Fasano
- Website: www.aeroplanemusic.be

Vito de Luca, better known as Aeroplane, is a Belgian nu disco music producer and DJ. Formerly a duo consisting of Vito de Luca and Stephen Fasano (currently known as The Magician), the latter member left in 2010. Known for incorporating a mix of French house and balearic beat, Aeroplane made a name for themselves as club DJs.

== Biography ==
Aeroplane have been chosen as the 500th Essential Mixer on the eclectic music show called Essential Mix broadcast by different DJs on BBC Radio 1 on Fridays between 1 am and 3 am. Aeroplane have been selected for this occasion by Pete Tong and a board of people to do with music and events. They have played a full hour of tracks upcoming on their album in the first hour of the anniversary show on 24 April 2010, where the show lasted for 4 hours instead of normal 2 hours, between 1 am and 5 am. For the following three hours, as a celebration of the 500th Mixer to appear on Essential Mix show, Pete Tong, Sasha and Richie Hawtin played their sets.

Aeroplane released debut album entitled We Can't Fly in September 2010, after 12 months of studio work. The album consists of pop songs written and performed by Vito de Luca, along with guests vocals from the likes of Au Revoir Simone, Merry Clayton, Sky Ferreira, Nicolas Kerr (Poni Hoax) and Jonathan Jeremiah. It received a positive review of 8 from SPIN magazine.

== Discography ==
=== Studio albums ===
Year	Album and details
2010	We Can't Fly: Released: September 27, 2010; Label: Eskimo Recordings; Formats: CD, digital download

=== Compilations ===
Year	Album and details
2011	In Flight Entertainment: Released: October 24, 2011; Label: Eskimo Recordings; Formats: CD, digital download

=== Extended plays ===
Year	Title	Release date	Label
2007	Aeroplane / Caramellas	Aug 27, 2007	Eskimo Recordings
2007	Pacific Air Race	Dec 20, 2007	Eskimo Recordings
2008	Whispers (featuring Kathy Diamond)	May 15, 2008	Eskimo Recordings
2010	Superstar	Sep 13, 2010	Eskimo Recordings
2010	Without Lies	Nov 15, 2010	Eskimo Recordings
2011	My Enemy	May 23, 2011	Eskimo Recordings
2012	We Can't Fly - The Remixes	Apr 23, 2012	Eskimo Recordings
2012	In Her Eyes (featuring Jamie Principle)	Nov 5, 2012	Aeropop Records
2013	I Don’t Feel (Deetron Remix)	Jan 21, 2013	Eskimo Recordings
2015	Let's Get Slow (featuring Benjamin Diamond)	Apr 20, 2015	Eskimo Recordings

=== Singles ===
Year	Title	Release date	Label	Album
2010	We Can't Fly	Jun 28, 2010	Eskimo Recordings	We Can't Fly

=== Collaborations ===
Year	Artists	Title	Release date	Label
2013	€urocrats (Aeroplane & Dimitri From Paris)	Unite	Feb 11, 2013	Aeropop Records
2013	Beateria (Aeroplane & Bot)	Country Business	Oct 14, 2013	Aeropop Records
2014	€urocrats (Aeroplane & Dimitri From Paris)	Black Hole Bass	Feb 10, 2014	Aeropop Records

=== Remixes ===
Year	Artist	Track	Title
2007	Cobra Dukes	"Airtight"	Aeroplane Remix; Aeroplane Dub
2007	Coyote	"Too Hard"	
2007	Das Pop	"Fool for Love"	
2008	Allez Allez	"Allez Allez"	
2008	Cut Copy	"Hearts on Fire"	Aeroplane Pop Mix
2008	David Rubato	"Circuit"	
2008	Friendly Fires	"Paris"	Aeroplane Remix featuring Au Revoir Simone
2008	Grace Jones	"Williams' Blood"	Aeroplane Remix; Aeroplane Dub
2008	Low Motion Disco	"Love Love Love"	
2008	Lullabies in the Dark	"Song for Marie and Elise"	
2008	MGMT	"Electric Feel"	
2008	The Beach Boys	"God Only Knows"	Aeroplane Bootleg Remix
2008	The Shortwave Set	"Now Til '69"	
2009	Au Revoir Simone	"Another Likely Story"	
2009	Doves	"Brazil"	
2009	Lindstrøm & Christabelle	"Baby Can't Stop"	Aeroplane Vocal Remix; Aeroplane Dub Remix
2009	Robbie Williams	"Bodies"	Aeroplane Remix; Aeroplane Instrumental Remix
2009	Sébastien Tellier	"Kilometer"	Aeroplane 'Italo 84' Remix
2010	Breakbot featuring Irfane	"Baby I'm Yours"	
2010	Chromeo	"Don't Turn the Lights On"	
2010	Friendly Fires / Flight Facilities	"Paris" / "Crave You"	Aeroplane vs. Friendly Fires vs. Flight Facilities - I Crave Paris
2010	Gypsy & The Cat	"The Piper's Song"	Aeroplane Tape Remix
2011	Black Van featuring Holy Ghost!	"Moments of Excellence"	
2011	Cassius	"The Sound of Violence"	
2011	Processory	"Nightfall"	Aeroplane Remix; Aeroplane Remix Version 2
2011	The Human League	"Never Let Me Go"	
2012	Alex Metric	"Rave Weapon"	Aeroplane Droid Mix
2012	Erika Spring	"Happy at Your Gate"	
2012	Giorgio Moroder vs. MB Disco	"From Here to Eternity"	
2012	Kimbra	"Two Way Street"	
2012	Mixhell	"Exit Wound"	
2012	Storm Queen	"Look Right Through"	
2012	The League Unlimited Orchestra	"Don't You Want Me"	Aeropop Edit
2012	The Rapture	"Sail Away"	
2012	Yuksek	"The Edge"	
2013	Compuphonic featuring Marques Toliver	"Sunset"	
2013	Justin Timberlake featuring Jay-Z	"Suit & Tie"	Aeroplane Vocal Mix; Aeroplane Instrumental
2013	Kris Menace featuring Romanthony	"2Nite4U"	
2013	Mayer Hawthorne	"Wine Glass Woman"	
2013	Pool	"Flex"	
2013	Surahn	"Wonderful"	
2014	Charli XCX	"Boom Clap"	
2014	Mystery Skulls	"Paralyzed"	
2014	Riton featuring Meleka	"Inside My Head"	
2014	Stromae	"Tous les mêmes"	
2014	We Were Evergreen	"Daughters"	

=== Music videos ===
Year	Title	Director	Release date	Label
2010	"Superstar"	Casey Raymond & Ewan Jones Morris	Sep 6, 2010	Eskimo Recordings
