= Inflorescent (album) =

2019 album by Friendly Fires

Studio album by Friendly Fires
- Released: 16 August 2019
- Genres: Dance-pop; indie pop; new wave; disco-funk; house
- Length: 44:20
- Label: Polydor
- Producers: Friendly Fires (exec.); Mark Ralph (exec.); James Ford; Disclosure; Alex Metric; Hal Ritson; Richard Adlam; Friend Within

Friendly Fires chronology
Pala (2011)	Inflorescent (2019)

Singles from Inflorescent
- 1. "Love Like Waves" Released: 5 April 2018; 2. "Heaven Let Me In" Released: 18 October 2018; 3. "Lack of Love" Released: 14 March 2019; 4. "Silhouettes" Released: 24 June 2019; 5. "Offline" Released: 2 November 2019

Inflorescent is the third studio album by British indie pop trio Friendly Fires. It was released on 16 August 2019 through Polydor Records and is the group's first album in eight years, following Pala, released in 2011.

== Background ==
After the band released and finished promoting their second album Pala the band parted ways on a hiatus. The groups frontman and singer Ed MacFarlane was working and contributing with acts, such as Disclosure and The Magician. MacFarlane also revealed that he had no intention of creating another record within the same vein as Pala and also revealing he had been working on more experimental material and the other bandmates were doing the same. MacFarlane and the group's guitarist Edd Gibson reunited to join forces with The Advisory Circle to work on music and, eventually formed a group, which was revealed in 2016 to be named The Pattern Forms. They released an album called Peel Away the Ivy in October of that year.

The band came back from their hiatus in 2018 when they released the album's lead single, entitled "Love Like Waves". One source described the song as, "taking inspiration from the previous solo electronic collaborations of the band members" but still "has all of the details that constitutes Friendly Fires’ sound."

The band announced the album in June 2019, alongside the release of its fourth single "Silhouettes" and a UK and Europe Tour for later on in the year, as well as a couple stops in Australia and North America.

== Critical reception ==
Professional ratings
Aggregate scores
Source	Rating
Metacritic	70/100
Review scores
Source	Rating
Allmusic	4/5 stars
Evening Standard	3/5 stars
The Guardian	4/5 stars
The Independent	2/5 stars
NME	2/5 stars
Pitchfork	7.0/10
Q	4/5 stars
The Times	4/5 stars

At Metacritic, which assigns a normalised rating out of 100 to reviews from mainstream critics, the album received an average score of 70, based on 10 reviews, which indicates "generally favorable reviews".

The album received mixed, but mostly positive reviews, with an average score of 67% as indicated on Album of the Year, a review aggregator site.

The music retail distributor HMV commented on the album's vibe, describing it as "lean, slick and very, very danceable." They also talked about the album's possible delivery, saying "Whether it's down to the influence of producers like James Ford, Mark Ralph and the Disclosure boys, or the time that Macfarlane and co. have reportedly spent reconnecting with the musical influences they first bonded over and dancing in clubs together again, Friendly Fires have returned to the fray with an album that feels like a much more focussed version of their trademark sound."

British music journal NME reviewed the album's songs as "joyful and inoffensive" and also criticised, "The worst part of 'Inflorescent' is that you won't hate it; you'll just forget you've even listened to it."

Online newspaper The Independent rated the album 2 out of 5 and compared the band and the album's work to that of Take That, Tears for Fears and Hot Chip, with its standout track being "Offline", which they described as having a sonic reference to ""Outside"-era George Michael."

The Evening Standard acclaimed the album, stating that it was "a return to the dancefloor after eight years away." They elaborated, " The channelling of Brazilian disco, funk and samba influences, plus singer Ed Macfarlane's endearing dad-dancing, made their lithe indie pop refreshing. On Inflorescent — their first album following an eight year hiatus — they aim brazenly for the dancefloor."

== Track listing ==
Track metadata adapted from Apple Music.

No.	Title	Writer(s)	Producer(s)	Length
1.	"Can't Wait Forever"	Edward MacFarlane; Edd Gibson; Jack Savidge; Hannah Yadi	Mark Ralph	3:30
2.	"Heaven Let Me In"	MacFarlane; Gibson; Savidge; Howard Lawrence; Guy Lawrence	Friendly Fires; Disclosure; Ralph^{[b]}; Alex Metric^{[b]}; Hal Ritson^{[b]}; Richard Adlam^{[b]}	4:40
3.	"Silhouettes"	MacFarlane; Gibson; Savidge; James Ford; Nicholas Hodgson	Ralph; Ford	3:41
4.	"Offline"	MacFarlane; Gibson; Savidge; Mark Ralph	Friend Within; Ralph	3:24
5.	"Sleeptalking"	MacFarlane; Gibson; Savidge	Ralph	3:31
6.	"Kiss and Rewind"	MacFarlane; Gibson; Savidge; Lucy Taylor; Nicholas Gale	Ralph	4:08
7.	"Love Like Waves"	MacFarlane; Gibson; Savidge	Ralph; Friendly Fires^{[a]}	4:30
8.	"Lack of Love"	Charles Birch; Adonis Smith	Friendly Fires; Ralph	4:21
9.	"Cry Wolf"	MacFarlane; Gibson; Savidge	Ralph	3:48
10.	"Almost Midnight"	MacFarlane; Gibson; Savidge	Ralph	4:14
11.	"Run the Wild Flowers"	MacFarlane; Gibson; Savidge; Ford	Ford	4:33
Total length:				44:20

Offline - EP
No.	Title	Writer(s)	Producer(s)	Length
1.	"Offline"	MacFarlane; Gibson; Savidge; Ralph		3:25
2.	"Offline" (PBR Streetgang Remix) (Radio Edit)	MacFarlane; Gibson; Savidge; Ralph		3:52
3.	"Tijuana"	MacFarlane; Gibson; Savidge	Friendly Fires	4:12
4.	"Run the Wild Flowers" (Icarus Remix)	MacFarlane; Gibson; Savidge; Ford		5:49
5.	"Dive into Your Eyes"	MacFarlane; Gibson; Savidge	Friendly Fires	4:41
6.	"Offline" (Cosmo's Midnight Remix)	MacFarlane; Gibson; Savidge; Ralph		3:06
7.	"Offline" (PBR Streetgang Remix)	MacFarlane; Gibson; Savidge; Ralph		6:30
Total length:				44:20

Notes

- ^{^[a]} signifies a co-producer
- ^{^[b]} signifies an additional producer
- "Offline" is an un-credited collaboration with Friend Within.
- "Lack of Love" is a cover of the original performed by Charles B and Adonis.

Sample credits

- "Offline" contains elements of "Chega Mais (Imaginei Você Dançando)", written and performed by Banda Black Rio.

== Charts ==
Chart (2019)	Peak position
Scottish Albums (Official Charts)	14
UK Albums (Official Charts)	15
