= Pala (album) =

Studio album by Friendly Fires
- Released: 16 May 2011
- Genres: Indie dance; post-punk; dream pop; synth-pop
- Length: 44:00
- Label: XL
- Producers: Friendly Fires; Paul Epworth; Chris Zane

Friendly Fires chronology
Friendly Fires (2008)	Pala (2011)	Inflorescent (2019)

Singles from Pala
- 1. "Live Those Days Tonight" Released: 23 March 2011; 2. "Hawaiian Air" Released: 25 July 2011; 3. "Blue Cassette" Released: 5 December 2011; 4. "Hurting" Released: 27 February 2012

Pala is the second studio album from British alternative dance band Friendly Fires. It was released in the UK on 16 May 2011, and charted at number 6 on the UK Albums Chart. The album name comes from Aldous Huxley's final novel Island, which tells the story of a journalist shipwrecked on the fictional island of Pala, which supports a utopian society. The scarlet macaw photograph was chosen from the private collection of Norwegian fashion photographer Sølve Sundsbø.

== Singles ==
- "Live Those Days Tonight" is the first single taken from the album. The track received its first play on Zane Lowe's show on BBC Radio 1 on 22 March 2011. The band performed the song on Late Night with Jimmy Fallon, and it was released to the US iTunes Store the next day. In the UK, it was released on 16 May 2011, the same day as the album, and charted at number 80 on the UK singles chart.
- "Hawaiian Air" was the second single taken from the album. The music video was shot in southern Spain in May 2011. It reached No. 92 in the UK, and appeared on the soundtrack of the 2012 racing video game Forza Horizon alongside "Hurting".
- "Blue Cassette" was released as the third single on 2 December 2011, along with the Tiga Remix of the single.
- "Hurting" was announced as the next single by Nick Grimshaw on BBC Radio 1 on 3 August 2011 with the release date confirmed as 10 October 2011. Remixes of the single were released on 27 February 2012. It appeared on the soundtrack of 2012 racing video game Forza Horizon alongside "Hawaiian Air".

== Critical reception ==
Professional ratings
Aggregate scores
Source	Rating
Metacritic	73/100
Review scores
Source	Rating
AllMusic	4/5 stars
BBC	(very favourable)
Clash	4/10 stars
Drowned in Sound	(8/10)
Evening Standard	4/5 stars
The Guardian	4/5 stars
The Independent	2/5 stars
Metro	4/5 stars
MusicOMH	4.5/5 stars
NME	8/10
Pitchfork Media	7.4/10
TMR	8/10 stars
Q	3/5 stars
Slant Magazine	3.5/5 stars

The album received a score of 73 on Metacritic (based on 22 reviews), indicating "generally favorable reviews".

== Track listing ==
Taken from the album booklet:

No.	Title	Writer(s)	Producer(s)	Length
1.	"Live Those Days Tonight"	Edward Gibson; Edward Macfarlane; Jack Savidge; Paul Epworth	Paul Epworth; Friendly Fires	5:02
2.	"Blue Cassette"	Gibson; Macfarlane; Savidge	Macfarlane; Epworth*	3:32
3.	"Running Away"	Gibson; Macfarlane; Savidge	Macfarlane; Chris Zane*	3:02
4.	"Hawaiian Air"	Gibson; Macfarlane; Savidge	Macfarlane	4:12
5.	"Hurting"	Gibson; Macfarlane; Savidge	Macfarlane; Epworth*; Zane*	5:03
6.	"Pala"	Gibson; Macfarlane; Savidge	Macfarlane; Zane*	4:01
7.	"Show Me Lights"	Gibson; Macfarlane; Savidge	Epworth; Friendly Fires	3:36
8.	"True Love"	Gibson; Macfarlane; Savidge	Macfarlane; Zane*	3:15
9.	"Pull Me Back to Earth"	Gibson; Macfarlane; Savidge	Macfarlane	3:30
10.	"Chimes"	Gibson; Macfarlane; Savidge	Epworth; Friendly Fires	4:37
11.	"Helpless"	Gibson; Macfarlane; Savidge	Macfarlane	4:30

iTunes Store bonus track
No.	Title	Writer(s)	Length
12.	"Strangelove"	Martin Gore	4:38

Amazon bonus track
No.	Title	Length
12.	"Stay Here (with Azari & III)"	4:38

US bonus tracks
No.	Title	Length
12.	"Hurting" (Tensnake Remix)	4:49
13.	"Blue Cassette" (Tiga Remix)	5:26
14.	"Hawaiian Air" (Totally Enormous Extinct Dinosaurs Remix)	5:31
15.	"Hurting" (Benoit & Sergio Remix)	7:13
16.	"Live Those Days Tonight" (Tim Green Main Mix)	8:50

Japan bonus tracks
No.	Title	Writer(s)	Length
12.	"Strangelove"	Martin Gore	4:38
13.	"Hold On"		5:06
14.	"Stay Here"		5:55

Japan tour limited edition bonus disc
No.	Title	Writer(s)	Length
1.	"Live Those Days Tonight" (Live in LA)		4:51
2.	"Hawaiian Air" (Live in LA)		4:26
3.	"Skeleton Boy" (Live in LA)		3:51
4.	"Jump in the Pool" (Live in LA)		3:55
5.	"Paris" (Live in LA)		4:02
6.	"Kiss of Life" (Live in LA)		7:34
7.	"The Edge of Glory" (Live at Maida Vale Studios)	Lady Gaga, Fernando Garibay, Paul Blair	3:16
8.	"Live Those Days Tonight" (Lone Remix)		6:28
9.	"Hawaiian Air" (Totally Enormous Extinct Dinosaurs Remix)		5:32
10.	"Hurting" (Benoit & Sergio Remix)		7:16
11.	"Blue Cassette" (Tiga Remix)		5:27

(*) additional production

Notes

- "Live Those Days Tonight" contains a sample of "Albondigas" by Badonday (Toby Tobias and Dave Garnish).
- "Hurting" contains a sample of "Lissoms" by Toro y Moi.

== Chart positions ==
Pala debuted on the UK Albums Chart at number 6 on 22 May 2011, that week's second highest debut after Kate Bush's Director's Cut. It also debuted at number 2 on the albums download chart, and number 3 on the UK Indie Chart.

=== Weekly charts ===
Chart (2011)	Peak position
Australian Albums (ARIA)	19
Irish Albums (IRMA)	29
Scottish Albums (Official Charts)	6
UK Albums (Official Charts)	6
US Billboard 200	152
US Top Rock Albums (Billboard)	36

=== Year-end charts ===
Chart (2011)	Position
UK Albums (OCC)	174

As of January 2012 UK sales stand at 90,000 copies according to The Guardian.
