= Purple Crush =

US musical group

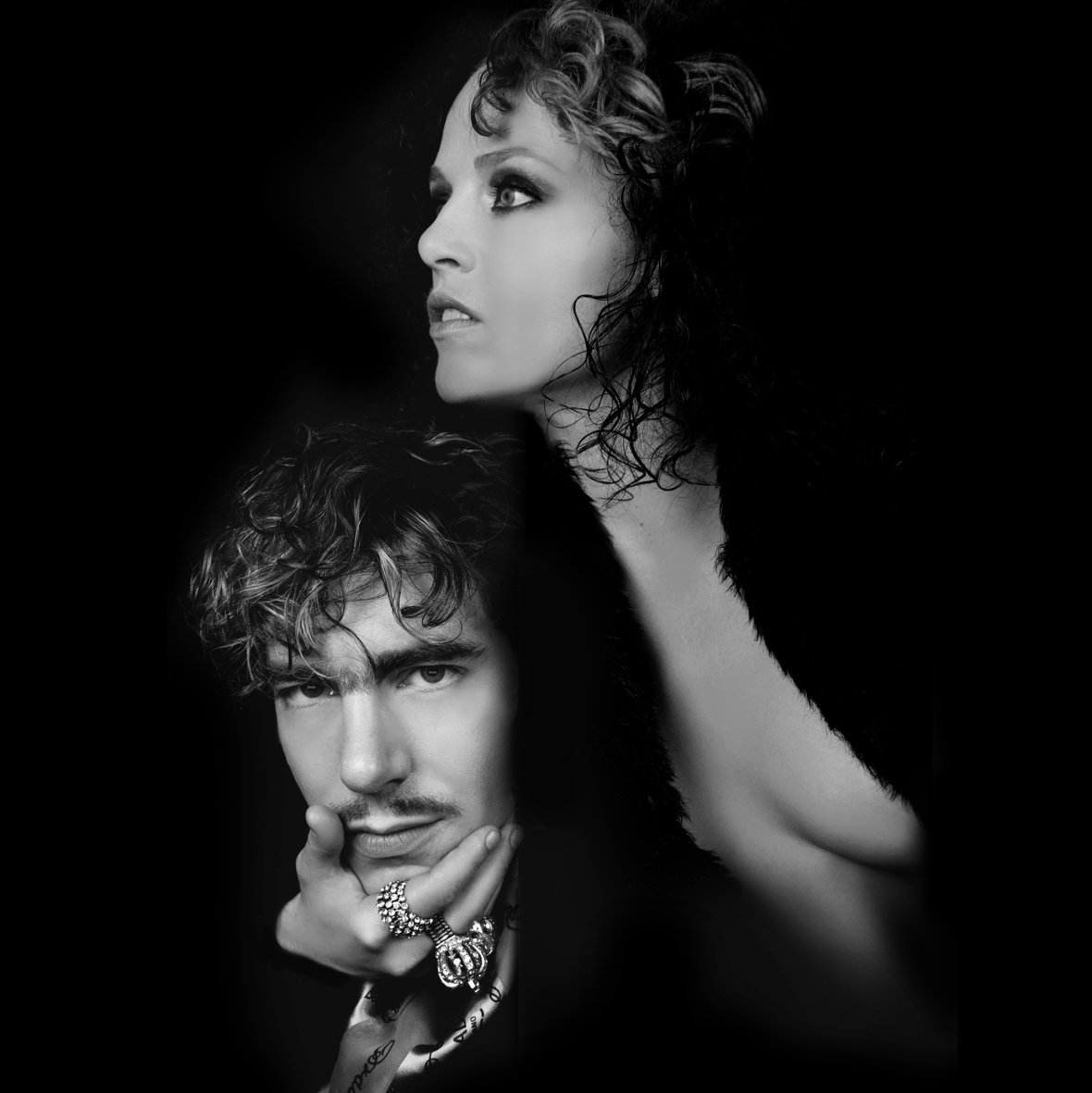
- Purple Crush in 2014

Background information
- Origin: Brooklyn, NY
- Genres: Electropop
- Years active: 2007-present
- Members: Isla Cheadle; Jared Selter
- Website: purplecrush.com

Purple Crush is an American dance music act consisting of married couple Isla Cheadle and Jared Selter. They met at The California Institute of the Arts, where they studied dance and music, respectively. Purple Crush was formed in Brooklyn, NY, where they also started their record label, Crushed Records. Purple Crush is known both for their choreographed live show as well as their pop songwriting and music production.

Crushed Records has released numerous LPs, EPs, and remix compilations featuring artists such as Spank Rock, Le1f, Raja, Jimmy Edgar, AC Slater and others.

Purple Crush has produced remixes for Interscope recording artists Natalia Kills, Far East Movement, and Midnight Red. In 2014, they were involved in a lawsuit over music they produced for Lady Gaga's Born This Way.

Purple Crush also claim recording artist Mariah Carey used the hook from their 2013 song "Thirsty" for her own song of the same name.

The self-described "hetero-married queer indie-pop duo" often take a political social/ironic stance in their music and videos. Frontiers magazine reviewed their 2014 album Iconoclassic in its May 2014 issue.

Purple Crush is also the founder and host of a Vogue mini-ball party called Banjee Ball which started monthly at the Downtown Los Angeles Standard Hotel and now takes place at Los Globos in Silverlake, Los Angeles. In 2016, they released a 5-song EP and short film entitled "Vogue Opera." featuring legendary members of East and Westcoast Ball culture.

Isla Cheadle appeared on the HBO Max original show Legendary as Isla Ebony, mother of the House of Ebony. She also pitched the show to Scout Productions. Isla and Jared were Music Directors for the show on Season 3.

== Discography ==
- L.C.D. (2007)
- Welcome 2 Emo Club (2007)
- Shopping on the Dancefloor Remix (2008)
- Blog Party (2008)
- Busy Boys Remix EP (2009)
- Get Digital featuring LE1F Remix EP (2009)
- Welcome 2 The Underground (2011)
- ICONOCLASSIC (2014)
- Vogue Opera (2016)
- Ballroom Baby (2021)
