= FabricLive.77 =

Compilation album by Erol Alkan
- Released: 23 September 2014
- Genre: Electronic
- Length: 1:16:20
- Label: Fabric

FabricLive chronology
FabricLive.76 (2014)	FabricLive.77 (2014)	FabricLive.78 (2014)

Erol Alkan chronology
I Love Techno (2012)	FabricLive.77 (2014)

Professional ratings
Review scores
Source	Rating
AllMusic	4/5 stars
Resident Advisor	3/5 stars

FabricLive.77 is a DJ mix album by English musician Erol Alkan. The album was released as part of the FabricLive Mix Series.

== Track listing ==
No.	Title	Length
1.	"Sofa Love (Jamie Paton Remix)" (featuring Maurice & Charles)	4:32
2.	"We Got the Box" (featuring Cowboy Rhythmbox)	2:55
3.	"Talento Matemático" (featuring Carisma)	2:19
4.	"RMI Is All I Want" (featuring The Emperor Machine)	4:40
5.	"Square Lights (Zongamin Remix)" (featuring Manfredas)	3:17
6.	"Acid On" (featuring Phreak)	2:36
7.	"Sub Conscious"	6:06
8.	"Trommer Og Bass" (featuring André Bratten)	5:02
9.	"Through Me" (featuring Tom Rowlands)	4:24
10.	"Jack2000" (featuring Fumes)	2:07
11.	"How You Want It" (featuring Victor Shan)	3:02
12.	"Acido" (featuring Boot & Tax)	3:42
13.	"Bang"	1:32
14.	"K3M" (featuring Ben Jenkins)	1:47
15.	"Put Your Weight on It" (featuring Todd Osborn)	2:46
16.	"From White to Red" (featuring Voiski)	4:42
17.	"Tone" (featuring Claro Intelecto)	2:54
18.	"Red Smoke" (featuring Ghost Culture)	6:45
19.	"Supersonic Transport" (featuring CF, Daywalker)	4:00
20.	"A Hold on Love/Only Love Can Break Your Heart" (featuring Saint Etienne)	7:12
