= Thirsty (Mariah Carey song) =

Promotional single by Mariah Carey

from the album Me. I Am Mariah... The Elusive Chanteuse
- Released: May 14, 2014
- Studio: Rapture Studios (Bel Air); Metrocity Studios (New York); Studio at the Dunes (Hamptons); Beach House Studios (Eleuthera); Henson Recording Studios (Los Angeles); Jungle City Studios (New York)
- Genre: R&B
- Length: 3:26
- Label: Def Jam
- Songwriters: Mariah Carey; Chauncey Hollis; Denesia Andrews; MaryAnn Tatum
- Producers: Mariah Carey; Hit-Boy; Rey Reel

"Thirsty" is a promotional single by American singer Mariah Carey from her fourteenth studio album, Me. I Am Mariah... The Elusive Chanteuse. It was co-written by Carey in collaboration with Hit-Boy, Denesia Andrews and MaryAnn Tatum. Carey and Hit-Boy also produced it, with co-production from Rey Reel. The alternate version of "Thirsty", featuring one rap verse from American rapper Rich Homie Quan, received its radio premiere on Power 105.1 on May 13, 2014, a day before the album version featuring just Carey was made available to stream. It has been described as a "club-friendly" R&B song influenced by hip hop, which makes use of a minimal synth beat.

The song was met with a mixed reaction from music critics; some were complimentary of her decision to work with Hit-Boy and Rich Homie Quan, while others felt that Carey was trying too hard to appeal to a mass audience by doing so. Electro pop band Purple Crush also claimed that Carey used the hook from their 2013 song of the same name. Following the release of the album, "Thirsty" debuted on the South Korean International Gaon Single Chart at number 78 due to strong digital download sales.

== Background ==
During an interview with Power 105.1 radio in a segment called The Breakfast Club, the host asked Carey if she had made a "bounce, gentleman's club" song due to the recent popularity of artists choosing to record "strip-club" songs, such as "Drunk in Love" by Beyoncé and "Pour It Up" by Rihanna. She confirmed that she had recorded a song for Me. I Am Mariah... The Elusive Chanteuse called "Thirsty", which embodies the same feel. Carey revealed that she had collaborated with Hit-Boy on the track.

"Thirsty" was co-written by Carey in collaboration with Hit-Boy, Denesia "Blu June" Andrews, and MaryAnn Tatum. Production of the song was carried out by Carey and Hit-Boy. It was co-produced with Rey Reel. Jeremy Cimino, Nico Essig, Rob Katz, Rob Suchecki, Matt Weber assisted in the song's recording, at Rapture Studios, Metrocity Studios, Studio at the Dunes, Beach House Studios, Henson Recording Studios, Studio at the Palms and Jungle City Studios, with mixing from Hazebanga and assistant mixing from Kevin Matela, Dave Rowland and Kenta Yonesaka at Germano Studios. The vocals were arranged by Carey, who also added background vocals along with Kaylana Tatum and Maryann Tatum. Tatum carried out additional background vocal production.

An alternate version of "Thirsty", featuring one rap verse from American rapper Rich Homie Quan, was released first and received its official radio premiere on Power 105.1 on May 13, 2014, while the solo album version featuring only Carey was made available to stream a day later. The single artwork for "Thirsty" was released on May 13, 2014. In the colourful picture, Carey is making a "sultry" pose in a strapless bikini top with matching lower half wrapped around her, with her midriff on show. Brett Maloc for E! thought that Carey looked "skinnier than ever". Despite Carey and Def Jam both confirming "Thirsty" as the fourth single to be released from the album, no release date was set. "You Don't Know What to Do" featuring Wale was released to urban contemporary radio on June 30, 2014 and rhythmic contemporary radio on July 1, 2014, as the fourth single instead.

== Composition ==
"Thirsty" is a "club-friendly" R&B song with an influence of hip hop music, which lasts for a duration of three minutes and 26 seconds. "Thirsty" is about how Carey's lover has a thirst for fame which causes her to drown in her own misery. Billy Johnson, Jr. for Yahoo! Music described the track as "[dissing] those desperate for attention." The singer is "taking center stage as she takes aim at a starfucker" as she performs her "nonchalant" verses over a "skittering" minimal synth beat. The songs begins with the sound of a drink being poured into a glass, after which the instrumental begins to play and Carey sings line "You used to be Mr. All About Me, now you're just thirsty for celebrity" in her upper register, then continues to ask her suitor "Why you try so damn hard?" During the chorus, Carey repeatedly sings the hook "Uh, you're Thirs-tay/ Uh, you're Thirs-tay".

Rich Homie Quan performs background chants on "Thirsty", although he is not credited on the album track list. He does, however, appear as a featured artist on an alternate version of the song, and performs one rap verse. For his part, he adds a "comedic element" by performing the line "Somebody get this girl a class of water/ I say she six nickels, not a dime past a quarter." The minimalist synth line of "Thirsty" has garnered comparisons to that of "Niggas in Paris", a song performed by Kanye West and Jay-Z, which was also produced by Hit-Boy in 2011. Critics have noted that although it is Hit-Boy's signature style to include a "steering background" beat in his production, that "Thirsty" is too "busy" compared to "Niggas in Paris" and that it comes off as "less appealing" and "watered-down" in comparison. Gerrick D. Kennedy for the Los Angeles Times wrote that "Thirsty" lacks the "heft" of a song that Hit-Boy produced called "Flawless" for Beyoncé's self-titled album in 2013.

== Critical reception ==
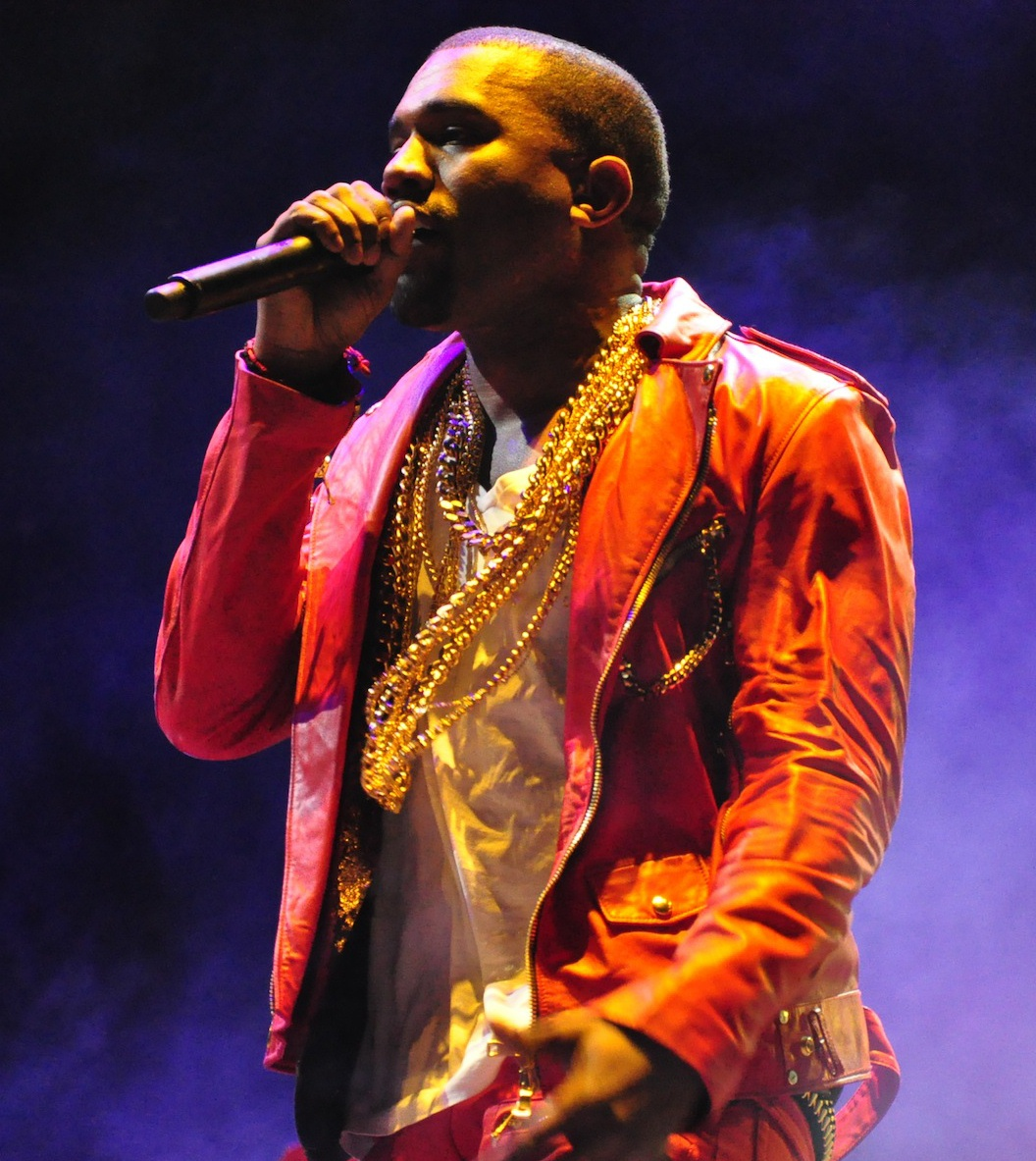
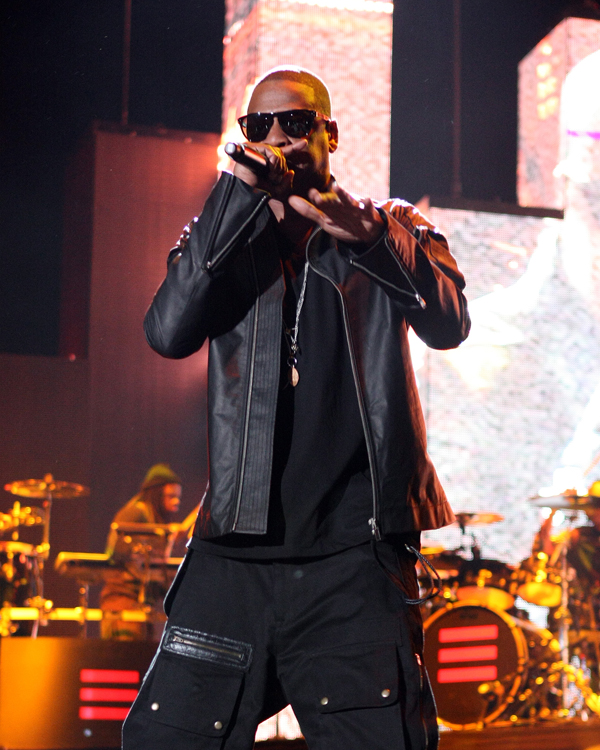
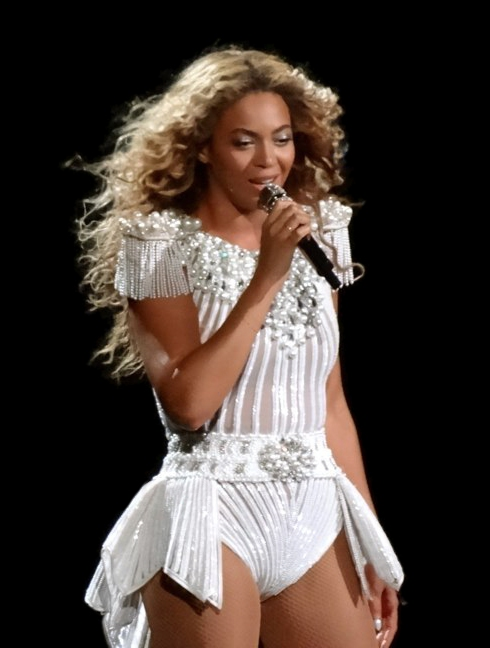
"Thirsty" has garnered comparisons to other songs produced by Hit-Boy, including "Niggas in Paris", performed by Kanye West (left) and Jay-Z (centre), and "Flawless", performed by Beyoncé (right).

While some critics thought Mariah was trying too hard with "Thirsty," the song has garnered mostly positive reviews from contemporary music critics. Christina Lee for Idolator was complimentary of the song, describing it as a single which her record label most probably wanted to release from the album in the first place. She went on to say that it is "tailor-made" for radio airplay "right now." Writing for the same publication, Mike Wass wrote that he thought the solo version was better than the alternate version featuring Rich Homie Quan's rap verse, writing "It's an improvement on the original. Not that there's anything wrong with the slick Hit-Boy production—I just don't like being distracted from Mimi’s mesmerizing vocals, not even for a verse."

Writing for Yahoo! Music, Bill Johnson, Jr. praised Carey for collaborating with Rich Homie Quan and for "working with rappers who are on the cusp of going mainstream." He explained that it is her "consistency and emphasis" on exposing up and coming rappers who are yet to release their own album that allows her to appeal to younger audiences, noting that they both benefit from the exposure. MTV writer Nadeska Alexis commented that it was "unexpected" to hear a song whereby Carey, Hit-Boy, and Rich Homie Quan featured on the same song, but continued to write that it "sounds like a blend of classic Mariah-pop."

Slant Magazine's Alexa Camp described the track as a "corrective of sorts" to her 2012 urban single release "Triumphant (Get 'Em)", a collaboration with Rick Ross and Meek Mill, noting that "Thirsty" is not "littered" with guest features. She continued to write that although it does not possess the memorability of some of her past releases, such as "Fantasy" or "Emotions", it serves as "a reminder of the pop gold Mimi can mine when she's on top of her game." Gerrick D. Kennedy for the Los Angeles Times was less impressed with "Thirsty", writing that although the song is not a "dud," he believes that Carey deserves better considering that it was she "who set the blueprint for mashing ethereal pop-R&B melodies with speaker-rattling hip-hop beats." He continued to criticize Carey for being too "desperate", writing:

Inspired by street lingo—"thirsty" for the unaware, is someone who is eager, verging on desperate—it seems laughable that Carey opted to pen such a gimmicky tune. She's delivered some of the best pop songs of the last two dozen years, and she certainly knows her way around a club groove (Need proof? Spin "It's Like That," which is almost a decade old). So why do an uninspired jam about a scrub if you're not going to deliver a sassy, melisma-soaked banger like those that came so effortlessly in the past (see "Obsessed," "Shake It Off," "Heartbreaker")? Why not remind the many contemporaries you've inspired, who are owning radio with more interesting spins off your blueprint, what makes you Mariah Carey?

== Controversy ==
A couple of days after "Thirsty" premiered, Los Angeles based pop duo Purple Crush posted a picture on their Instagram account which showed a picture of themselves on the left and a picture of Carey on the right, claiming that the song bears similarities to a single they released of the same name in 2013. Mike Wass from Idolator noted that the only similarity appears to be the name of the song and two words used in the hook. Purple Crush have previously sued Lady Gaga and her manager Rob Fusari for allegedly using their work without the duo's permission for Gaga's debut studio album, The Fame (2008).

== Live performances ==
The song was performed on James Corden's late-night show's Carpool Karaoke by Carey and Corden. The song was included on Carey's 2014 tour, The Elusive Chanteuse Show.

== Chart performance ==
Upon the release of the album, "Thirsty" debuted at number 78 on the South Korean International Digital Singles chart, and number 50 on the Download chart, with sales of 3,679 units.

Chart (2014)	Peak position
South Korea International (Circle)	78
