= Friendly Fires (album) =

Studio album by Friendly Fires
- Released: 1 September 2008
- Genres: Dance-rock; synth-pop; dream pop; dance-punk; electropunk
- Length: 37:02
- Label: XL
- Producers: Ed Macfarlane; Paul Epworth

Friendly Fires chronology
Friendly Fires (2008)	Pala (2011)

Friendly Fires is the debut studio album from British band Friendly Fires. It was released in the UK on 1 September 2008 where it reached a peak of number 21 on the UK Albums Chart. All tracks were produced by Ed Macfarlane apart from the first track, "Jump in the Pool", which was produced by Paul Epworth. The album was re-released on 31 August 2009 with the addition of five remixes of the album's original tracks, plus three new tracks including the Epworth-produced "Kiss of Life".

== Reception ==
Professional ratings
Aggregate scores
Source	Rating
Metacritic	75/100
Review scores
Source	Rating
Allmusic	3/5 stars
BBC	(favourable)
ChartAttack	(favourable)
The Guardian	4/5 stars
The Independent	(favourable)
MusicOMH	3.5/5 stars
NME	8/10 stars
Pitchfork Media	(7.9/10)
Rolling Stone	3.5/5 stars
Spin	3.5/5 stars

Friendly Fires originally debuted on the UK Albums Chart at number 38 on 13 September 2008. The following week, the album fell to number 88, before falling out of the Top 100 the week after. The album re-entered the Top 100 on two occasions, firstly at number 75 on 1 November 2008 and then again at number 95 on 21 December 2008, where it remained within the Top 100 for four consecutive weeks.

On 16 May 2009, the album re-entered the Top 100 once more at number 89, where it slowly began to climb the chart, eventually reaching number 37 on 6 June 2009. The album then slowly fell, before climbing to number 36 on 1 August 2009, weeks before the re-release of the album, due to being short-listed for the Mercury Prize of 2009.

The album was re-released in its deluxe format on 31 August 2009, and after falling to number 66, jumped to a new peak position of number 21 on 12 September 2009, where it remained on the chart for 3 more weeks before falling out of the Top 100.

== Singles ==
- "On Board" was released as the first single from the album during 2007. The single acted as the first of two promotional singles and failed to chart in the UK.
- "Paris" was released as the second single from the album during 2007. The single acted as the second promotional single and failed to chart in the UK.
- "Jump in the Pool" was released as the third single from the album on 1 September 2008 to accompany the release of the album. The single debuted at number 100 on the UK Singles Chart, marking the band's first hit in the UK.
- "Paris" was re-released as the fourth single from the album on 10 November 2008. The single failed to chart in the UK.
- "Skeleton Boy" was released as the fifth single from the album on 2 March 2009. The single debuted at number 48 on the UK Singles Chart and remained within the Top 100 for 3 consecutive weeks. This version of the song was produced by Paul Epworth and was used in the promotional video for the song. This version is different from the version on the album that was produced by Ed Macfarlane, in that it is 30 seconds longer than the original version and features an extended instrumental bridge.
- "Jump in the Pool" was re-released as the sixth single from the album on 18 May 2009. The single debuted at number 70 on the UK Singles Chart before climbing to a peak position of number 57 the following week.
- "Kiss of Life" was released as the seventh and final single from the album on 11 August 2009, also acting as the lead single from the re-release of the album. The single debuted at number 30 on the UK Singles Chart, marking the band's most successful single to date and remained within the Top 100 for 3 consecutive weeks.

== Track listing ==
No.	Title	Length
1.	"Jump in the Pool"	3:35
2.	"In the Hospital"	3:51
3.	"Paris"	3:55
4.	"White Diamonds"	4:11
5.	"Strobe"	3:04
6.	"On Board"	3:42
7.	"Lovesick"	3:53
8.	"Skeleton Boy"	3:33
9.	"Photobooth"	3:23
10.	"Ex Lover"	3:50

Re-release Bonus Track
No.	Title	Length
1.	"Kiss of Life"	4:09

iTunes Bonus Track
No.	Title	Length
11.	"Relationships"	5:22

Deluxe Edition
No.	Title	Length
1.	"Kiss of Life"	4:09
2.	"Bored of Each Other"	3:28
3.	"Relationships"	5:22
4.	"Skeleton Boy" (Paul Epworth Version)	4:03
5.	"Paris" (Aeroplane Remix)	7:43
6.	"Jump in the Pool" (Thin White Duke Remix)	7:03
7.	"White Diamonds" (Ray Mang Remix)	5:32
8.	"Skeleton Boy" (Air France Remix)	4:58

Deluxe Edition Bonus DVD
No.	Title	Length
1.	"Live at the London's Forum" (15 May 2009)	48:13
2.	"Kiss of Life" (music video)	4:06
3.	"Jump in the Pool" (music video)	3:37
4.	"Skeleton Boy" (music video)	3:52
5.	"Paris" (music video)	3:47

== Charts ==
Chart (2008)	Peak position
Australian Albums (ARIA Charts)	92
UK Albums Chart	21
