= Cheetah Bend =

Studio album by Jimmy Edgar
- Released: February 26, 2021
- Length: 43:00
- Label: Innovative Leisure
- Producer: Jimmy Edgar

Jimmy Edgar chronology
Majenta (2012)	Cheetah Bend (2021)

Professional ratings
Review scores
Source	Rating
Loud and Quiet	6/10
Pitchfork	6.9/10

Cheetah Bend is the fourth studio album by the American musician Jimmy Edgar, released on February 26, 2021, through Innovative Leisure. The album was first announced in January 2021. It was mostly created in Los Angeles, Atlanta and Detroit, with the mixes done in Portland.
