= Paris (Friendly Fires song) =

Single by Friendly Fires

from the album Friendly Fires
- Released: 10 November 2008
- Genre: Shoegaze; disco house; synthpop; alternative dance
- Length: 4:02
- Label: XL
- Songwriter(s): Edward Gibson, Jack Savidge, Axel Willner, Edward Macfarlane

Friendly Fires singles chronology
"Jump in the Pool" (2008)	"Paris" (2008)	"Skeleton Boy" (2009)

"Paris" is the second single by Friendly Fires taken from the band's self-titled debut album Friendly Fires. The song features backing vocals from the members of the American indie pop trio Au Revoir Simone, and samples the song "Sun and Ice" from the album From Here We Go Sublime by The Field.

The Aeroplane remix of the song features the members of Au Revoir Simone on lead vocals.

In October 2011, music magazine NME placed it at number 47 on its list "150 Best Tracks of the Past 15 Years".

In 2012, "Paris" was listed by NME in 48th place on its list of "50 Most Explosive Choruses."

== Track listing ==
12" vinyl

1. "Paris" (Justus Kohncke Remix) – 10:30
2. "Paris" (Aeroplane Remix ft. Au Revoir Simone) – 7:45

Download

1. "Paris" – 4:02
2. "Paris" (Aeroplane Remix) – 7:45
3. "Paris" (Justus Kohncke Remix) – 10:30

== Charts ==
Chart (2008)	Peak position
UK Indie Chart	13
