= The Bird of Music =

Studio album by Au Revoir Simone
- Released: March 5, 2007 (UK)
- Genre: Indie pop, dream pop
- Length: 45:00
- Label: Moshi Moshi Records (UK); Our Secret Record Company (US)
- Producer: Rod Sherwood

Au Revoir Simone chronology
Verses of Comfort, Assurance & Salvation (2005)	The Bird of Music (2007)	Still Night, Still Light (2009)

Professional ratings
Review scores
Source	Rating
AllMusic	4/5 stars
Pitchfork	5.9/10

The Bird of Music is the second studio album by American indie pop band Au Revoir Simone. It was released on March 5, 2007, on the Moshi Moshi label in the UK, and on the trio's own Our Secret Record Company label in the US.

== Track listing ==
1. "The Lucky One" - 4:30
2. "Sad Song" - 4:07
3. "Fallen Snow" - 3:45
4. "I Couldn't Sleep" - 2:31
5. "A Violent Yet Flammable World" - 5:01
6. "Don't See the Sorrow" - 4:30
7. "Dark Halls" - 3:26
8. "Night Majestic" - 3:00
9. "Stars" - 2:58
10. "Lark" - 4:19
11. "The Way to There" - 6:49
