= XXX (Jimmy Edgar album) =

Studio album by Jimmy Edgar
- Released: June 2010
- Recorded: 2008
- Genre: Techno
- Label: !K7 Records
- Producer: Jimmy Edgar

Jimmy Edgar chronology
Color Strip (2006)	XXX (2010)	Majenta (2012)

XXX is a studio album by techno producer Jimmy Edgar. Released in June 2010 by !K7 Records, Allmusic gave it 3.5/5 stars, describing the album as "smutty neo-electro."

== Production and release ==
Edgar began producing XXX, his second solo album under his real name, around 2008. Edgar used more analog recording techniques than his previous releases, which had been in the genres of glitch and Detroit techno. Edgar also plays bass guitar on several tracks, and collaborates with several guest vocalists.

Originally titled Deeper, XXX was allegedly rejected by Warp Records in 2008, with Edgar leaving the label around that time. XXX came out June 2010 on K7 Records. It was released digitally on July 27, 2010, and on CD on September 14, 2010. Around the time of the release Edgar continued to tour internationally, notably in cities such as Tokyo, Zagreb, Istanbul, Athens, Tallinn, Moscow, Turin, London, and Berlin.

== Reception ==
Professional ratings
Review scores
Source	Rating
Allmusic	3.5/5 stars

Andy Kellman of Allmusic gave XXX 3.5/5 stars, writing that Edgar's increased use of analog equipment in the recording process "refines his smutty neo-electro." Kellman further asserted the production "has a way of slightly rounding off the sharp edges of the producer's sound, placing him closer to the modern funk likes of Dâm-Funk than glitch."

== Track listing ==
1. "Function of Your Love"
2. "Hot, Raw, Sex"
3. "Turn You Inside Out"
4. "New Touch"
5. "One Twenty Detail"
6. "Rewind, Stop that Tape"
7. "Push"
8. "Physical Motion" (vocals by Azealia Banks)
9. "In My Color"
10. "Midnite Fone Call"
11. "Vibration"
12. "Sleep Connexion (Date Rp)"

== Personnel ==
- Jimmy Edgar - producer, primary

artist

- Azealia Banks - background Vocals Anete Kirvelaite
