= Verses of Comfort, Assurance & Salvation =

Studio album by Au Revoir Simone
- Released: March 23, 2005 (US); October 31, 2005 (UK)
- Genre: Indie pop, dream pop
- Length: 27:31
- Label: Our Secret Record Company; Moshi Moshi Records
- Producer: Rod Sherwood

Au Revoir Simone chronology
Verses of Comfort, Assurance & Salvation (2005)	The Bird of Music (2007)

Professional ratings
Review scores
Source	Rating
AllMusic	4/5 stars
The Deli Magazine	(favourable)
Pitchfork	(7.5/10)
Wear the Trousers	4/5 stars

Verses of Comfort, Assurance & Salvation is the debut studio album of American indie pop band Au Revoir Simone. It was originally released on March 23, 2005, on the trio's own Our Secret Record Company label; it was subsequently issued in Europe on October 31 by Moshi Moshi Records, and later by the Rallye Label in Japan.

The band members recorded the album in a basement shower stall that belonged to their manager, Rod Sherwood, who converted the stall into a vocal booth with the aid of a few handy quilts. "Through the Backyards" was the first track to be released as a single, which was included on David Byrne's web-based radio station.

== Track listing ==
1. "Through the Backyards" – 3:54
2. "Hurricanes" – 3:46
3. "The Disco Song" – 2:19
4. "Where You Go" – 2:41
5. "Back in Time" – 5:18
6. "The Winter Song" – 2:52
7. "And Sleep Al Mar" – 3:53
8. "Stay Golden" – 2:48
