= Kathy Diamond =

- Origin: Sheffield, United Kingdom
- Genres: Disco, funk, soul
- Occupations: Singer, songwriter
- Instrument: Vocals
- Years active: 1993–present
- Labels: Permanent Vacation, Gomma

Kathy Diamond is a funk/disco house singer-songwriter from London, United Kingdom. She was born in Sheffield in the north of England. Her love for soul and disco started at an early age, gaining inspiration from Donna Summer.

In 1993 Diamond decided to write and sing herself, collaborating different bands, DJs and producers. In 2002 she wrote a Balearic song with house producers SWAG called "Miracles Just Might." After SWAG did not include it on their album Diamond decided to release the song herself. She pressed up a limited amount of white labels and distributed it. DJ Magazine said of the track, "If you like sweet beauty in your house music keep your eyes peeled because it's only going to get a limited release." Within a month another 12" single "Sunshine" was released, this time on the Idjut Boys' Cottage label with producer Maurice Fulton.

== Miss Diamond to You ==
Miss Diamond to You

Studio album by Kathy Diamond
- Released: 27 April 2007
- Genre: Disco, Funk, Northern soul, House
- Label: Permanent Vacation
- Producer: Maurice Fulton

Singles from Miss Diamond to You
- 1. "All Woman" Released: 2006; 2. "Over" Released: 2007

Professional ratings
Review scores
Source	Rating
New York Sun	(positive)
Pitchfork Media	(7.8/10)
Village Voice	(positive)
XLR8R	(positive)

In 2007, Diamond released her solo debut record, Miss Diamond to You. She collaborated with Maurice Fulton of electronica/dance outfit MU. It rated 7.8 on influential music site Pitchfork Media. It also received positive reviews from XLR8R, The Village Voice and The New York Sun. Two singles were released from the album, "All Woman" and "Over". Diamond embarked on a 2007 concert tour in support of the album performing around Europe and the UK.

=== Track listing ===
1. "Between The Lines" (6:13)
2. "In All You See A Woman" (0:17)
3. "All Woman" (6:07)
4. "I Need You Here Right Now" (0:20)
5. "Until The Sun Goes Down" (5:29)
6. "Created & Enhanced" (0:35)
7. "The Moment" (6:15)
8. "Over" (5:49)
9. "However You Get Here" (0:19)
10. "Racing Thru Time" (5:31)
11. "Another Life" (6:50)
12. "On & On" (5:50)
13. "I Need You" (5:17)
14. "Another Life (Original)" (5:38)

== 2008 ==
In 2008 Diamond participated in a number of musical collaborations; with Toby Tobias for "The Feeling", with Soft Rocks for a remix of Low Motion Disco's "Love, Love, Love," with Belgian band Aeroplane on "Whispers," with Maximilian Skiba on "Never Stop Believing," and with Codebreaker for "Fire." Later in the year she will release her second album, working with co-writer and guitarist Keeling Lee.

== 2012 ==
The KDMS released their album "Kinky Dramas And Magic Stories" on Gomma Records, Munich with the track High Wire which was written and composed by Kathy Diamond and Maximilian Skiba.

== Singles ==
Year	Song	Album
2003	"Miracles Just Might"	-
2003	"Sunshine"	-
2006	"All Woman"	Miss Diamond to You
2007	"Over"	Miss Diamond to You
2008	"Love Love Love Part 2" (with Low Motion Disco)	-
2008	"The Feeling" (with Toby Tobias)	Space Shuffle
2008	"Whispers" (with Aeroplane)	-
2008	"Fire" (with Codebreaker)	-
2012	"High Wire" (with The KDMS)	-
2013	"Take A Real Good Look" (with Cabaret Nocturne)	-
