= Still Night, Still Light =

Studio album by Au Revoir Simone
- Released: May 19, 2009
- Genre: Indie pop, dream pop
- Length: 47:47
- Label: Moshi Moshi Records; Our Secret Record Company
- Producer: Au Revoir Simone; Thom Monahan

Au Revoir Simone chronology
| The Bird of Music (2007) | Still Night, Still Light (2009) | Move in Spectrums (2013) |

Still Night, Still Light is the third studio album by American indie pop band Au Revoir Simone. It was released on Moshi Moshi Records and Our Secret Record Company on May 19, 2009. The album was produced by Thom Monahan.

The remix album, titled Night Light, was released in 2010.

== Critical reception ==
Professional ratings
Aggregate scores
| Source | Rating |
|---|---|
| Metacritic | 71/100 |
Review scores
| Source | Rating |
| AllMusic | 4/5 stars |
| Drowned in Sound | 7/10 |
| Pitchfork | 7.8/10 |

At Metacritic, which assigns a weighted average score out of 100 to reviews from mainstream critics, the album received an average score of 71% based on 15 reviews, indicating "generally favorable reviews".

== Track listing ==
| No. | Title | Length |
|---|---|---|
| 1. | "Another Likely Story" | 4:39 |
| 2. | "Shadows" | 4:03 |
| 3. | "All or Nothing" | 4:28 |
| 4. | "Knight of Wands" | 3:49 |
| 5. | "The Last One" | 4:42 |
| 6. | "Trace a Line" | 3:58 |
| 7. | "Only You Can Make You Happy" | 4:58 |
| 8. | "Take Me as I Am" | 2:23 |
| 9. | "Anywhere You Looked" | 3:40 |
| 10. | "Organized Scenery" | 3:13 |
| 11. | "We Are Here" | 3:51 |
| 12. | "Tell Me" | 4:11 |

== Charts ==
| Chart | Peak position |
|---|---|
| US Heatseekers Albums (Billboard) | 25 |
