= Move in Spectrums =

Studio album by Au Revoir Simone
- Released: September 24, 2013
- Genre: Indie pop, dream pop
- Length: 43:33
- Label: Moshi Moshi Records; Instant Records
- Producer: Au Revoir Simone; Jorge Elbrecht

Au Revoir Simone chronology
Still Night, Still Light (2009)	Move in Spectrums (2013)

Move in Spectrums is the fourth studio album by American indie pop band Au Revoir Simone. It was released on September 24, 2013 by Moshi Moshi Records and Instant Records.

The remix album, titled Spectrums, was released in 2014.

== Critical reception ==
Professional ratings
Aggregate scores
Source	Rating
Metacritic	76/100
Review scores
Source	Rating
AllMusic	4/5 stars
Drowned in Sound	8/10
Pitchfork	7.3/10
PopMatters	7/10 stars
Slant Magazine	3.5/5 stars

At Metacritic, which assigns a weighted average score out of 100 to reviews from mainstream critics, the album received an average score of 76% based on 13 reviews, indicating "generally favorable reviews".

== Track listing ==
No.	Title	Length
1.	"More Than"	4:47
2.	"The Lead Is Galloping"	2:32
3.	"Crazy"	2:55
4.	"We Both Know"	4:51
5.	"Just Like a Tree"	4:28
6.	"Somebody Who"	3:24
7.	"Gravitron"	4:31
8.	"Boiling Point"	4:33
9.	"Love You Don't Know Me"	2:55
10.	"Hand Over Hand"	5:07
11.	"Let the Night Win"	5:30

== Charts ==
Chart	Peak position
US Heatseekers Albums (Billboard)	8
