= Nine Circles =

Dutch-German minimal electronic band

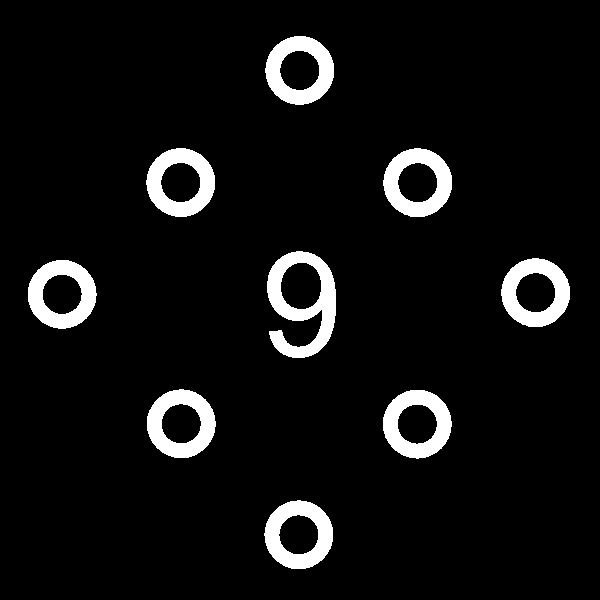
- Nine Circles Logo

Background information
- Origin: Amsterdam, Netherlands
- Genres: New wave, minimal electronic, minimal wave
- Years active: 1980–1982, 2010–present
- Members: Lidia "The Rose" Fiala, Per-Anders Kurenbach
- Past members: Peter van Garderen
- Website: www.nine-circles.de

Nine Circles is a Dutch-German minimal electronic band. The name originates from the "Nine Circles of Hell" from Dante Alighieri's Divine Comedy.

== Nine Circles 1980–1982 ==
Nine Circles were founded in 1980 in Amsterdam by Lidia "The Rose" Fiala and Peter van Garderen. Van Garderen played in the band Genetic Factor (together with Richard Zijlstra and Jan Snijders) and met Lidia Fiala, who already wrote poems and lyrics since she was 15 years old.

Richard Zijlstra worked at VPRO and presented a radio show called Spleen. It gave new wave bands a chance to become known. Bands sent in their demo tapes to VPRO and some of them got the possibility to play live in the radio and to release their songs on the compilation LP "Radio Nome". Nine Circles got the live radio deal and also the possibility to be on the LP. In the meantime van Garderen and Fiala became a couple and within two years they composed about 60 songs, from which almost half of them were released on several records until 2013. 1982 the relationship broke up and with it also the band. Later Fiala lived in another relationship and took care of her new partner and her kids. She put away the music, but still wrote poems and lyrics.

== Nine Circles 2009–present ==
In 2009 Fiala's youngest son Patrick surfed the Internet and found out about his mother's former band. Much to her surprise Fiala found that people were interested in her music, that the "Radio Nome" LP was sold for insane prices, and that even a whole CD of Nine Circles was released without her knowledge. More than 25 years she had neither talked about the music nor listened to it because she thought it was bad and people wouldn't like it. In 2010 she decided to revive Nine Circles. Since van Garderen lived a different life where music had no place, he couldn't join Fiala in the band, but he supported her by sending her most of the old recordings to be officially released on vinyl. So she engaged a new keyboarder, wrote new songs and played some concerts. Over time it turned out, that the keyboarder deceived her and ripped her off, so that Fiala had to split up with him and Nine Circles was on the verge of "dying" again.

In 2012 Nine Circles was revived a second time. Through Facebook and MySpace Lidia Fiala met Per-Anders Kurenbach (Psyche, Shock Therapy, The Eternal Afflict) and both recognized that they were on the same wavelength. They played their first concert in Lyon (France) at the end of May without having rehearsed together and even without having met in person before. Nevertheless, the concert was a success and so other concerts followed. An album with new songs was released in 2014.

== Releases ==
=== Albums ===
- "Nice Circles" CD (GER, 1996)
- "Live Queekhoven 1982" CDR (GER, 2011)
- "The Early Days" 2LP (GER, 2012)
- "Alice" LP/CD (GER, 2014)

=== Singles ===
- "New Era/Tsar Bomba" 7" (GER, 2011)
- "How's About The Aims In Life/Your Heat Burns My Mask" 7" (GER, 2012)
- "Number Not Available/The Face Behind A Clown" 7" (BEL, 2014)

=== Compilations ===
- "Twinkling Stars" and "What's There Left" on "Various Artists – Radionome" LP (NL, 1982)
- "How About The Aims In Life" on "Various Artists – Colonial Vipers" MC (NL, 1982)
- "Here Come I, Here Is Me" on "Various Artists – Nullzeit" CDR (NL, 2010)
- "Twinkling Stars" on "Various Artists – Cold Waves + Minimal Electronics" 2LP/CD (UK, 2010)
- "Mister Nothing" on "Various Artists – Future Echo Tape 01" MC (A, 2011)
- "The Rose (New Era)" on "Various Artists – Death # Disco" CD (GER, 2011)
- "Here Come I, Here Is Me" on "Various Artists – Underground Wave Volume 3" LP (BEL, 2012)
- "In The Dark Of The Night" on "Various Artists – Frogmania 2" LP (GER, 2013)
- "I'm Deeply Touched" on "Various Artists – 80s Compilation EP" 7" (BEL, 2013)
- "Mercy" on "Various Artists – Electric Voice II" LP (CAN, 2013)
- "Games" on "Various Artists – Tunes That R... Attractive!" LP (UK, 2013)

=== Cover versions ===
- "What's There Left" on "Sixth June – Everytime" CD (GER, 2010)
- "What's There Left" on "Roxy Epoxy – 1000" 12" (FR, 2010)

=== Bootlegs ===
- "What's There Left" on "A Tribute To Flexi-Pop – Vol.1" CDR (GER 1990)
- "What's There Left" on "Shock Waves – Vol.1" CDR (GER 1990)
- "Nine Circles" CD (GER, 1996)
