= Majenta =

Studio album by Jimmy Edgar
- Released: 2012
- Genre: Techno
- Label: Hotflush Recordings
- Producer: Jimmy Edgar

Jimmy Edgar chronology
XXX (2010)	Majenta (2012)	Cheetah Bend (2021)

Professional ratings
Aggregate scores
Source	Rating
Metacritic	59/100
Review scores
Source	Rating
BBC	(positive)
Pitchfork	5.2/10.0
Resident Advisor	4/5 stars

Majenta is a studio album by American electronic musician Jimmy Edgar, released in 2012 on Hotflush Recordings. It met with a mixed reception, with Resident Advisor writing that it "quite possibly represents Edgar's most full-blooded work yet."

== Critical reception ==
Magenta received some acclaim from music critics while other reviews were mixed. At Metacritic, which assigns a normalized rating out of 100 to reviews from mainstream critics, the album received an average score of 59 based on eight reviews, indicating "mixed or average reviews". Majenta received 4/5 stars from the publication Resident Advisor, with the reviewer writing that "Jimmy Edgar has found a new home at Hotflush, but not a whole lot has changed in his purple-hued world of robot decadence. Majenta is scantily clad in the same skeletal synth funk, though it was apparently conceived in a passionate flurry of creativity rather than the belaboured nature of his previous works... it's a tighter record that struts and gyrates in a more assured fashion than the sprawling XXX, and quite possibly represents Edgar's most full-blooded work yet." In a positive review of Majenta for the BBC, Rich Handscomb focused on the erotic elements of the album, writing that "as difficult as it is to take Edgar seriously at times, so earnest is he about his sexualised sonic seercraft that resistance is futile."

== Track listing ==
1. "Too Shy"
2. "This One’s For the Children"
3. "Sex Drive"
4. "Indigo Mechanix (3D)"
5. "Attempt to Make it Last"
6. "Let Yrself Be"
7. "Touch Yr Bodytime"
8. "Hrt Real Good"
9. "I Need Your Control"
10. "Heartkey"
11. "In Deep"
12. "Switch Switch"

== Personnel ==
- Jimmy Edgar - primary artist
