= Ed Macfarlane =

English singer-songwriter

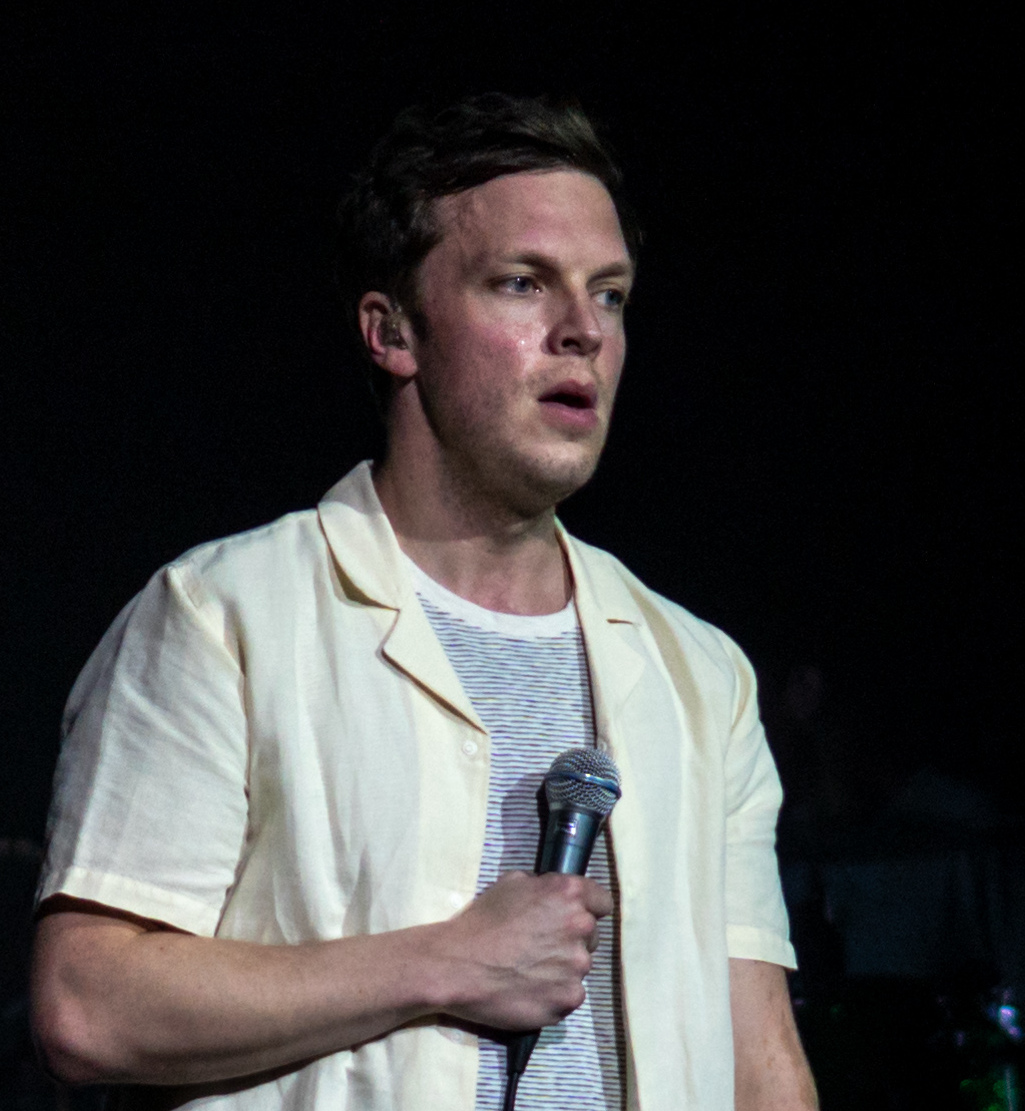
- Macfarlane performing at a Friendly Fires concert in 2018

Background information
- Also known as: Ed Mac
- Born: Edward David MacFarlane; 15 May 1984 (age 42)
- Origin: St Albans, Hertfordshire, England
- Genres: Indie rock; dance-punk; electronic; synth-pop
- Occupations: Singer; songwriter; musician; record producer
- Instruments: Vocals; bass guitar; keyboards; synthesizer
- Labels: XL; Skam; Precinct

Edward David MacFarlane (born 15 May 1984) is an English singer, songwriter, musician, record producer and the lead vocalist of the English electronic music band Friendly Fires. He is often called by the nickname "Ed Mac" to avoid confusion with his bandmate and guitarist Edd Gibson. He has written, co-written, produced or co-produced all of the Friendly Fires' songs.

== Background and education ==
Macfarlane attended St Albans School in Hertfordshire, where he met his future bandmates Edd Gibson and Jack Savidge. They formed their first band, a post-hardcore band, called First Day Back, at age 13. Because St Albans lacked big-name artists coming into town to do shows, the three often went into London for shows ("St Albans is close enough to London that no one ever wants to go near it.") Macfarlane looks upon the lack of gigs or scene in St Albans as a benefit to living there, saying to American music blog PopWreckoning in an interview at Dot to Dot Festival in Nottingham in May 2009, "I like the fact that in St Albans, there are no distractions." The band took advantage of this peace and quiet, using Macfarlane's parents' garage in St Albans to record their debut album Friendly Fires.

He attended Nottingham Trent University, earning a BA (Hons) in photography in 2006. He has said his time there influenced his development as a musician: "My course at NTU was great, there was a lot more theory than I originally thought there would be, but it’s helped me no end. We were always encouraged to describe why we’ve created something – which I apply to my music all the time. It’s really inspired me to question my music and think about the sound or feeling I’m trying to create."

Macfarlane is a keen ornithologist and can often be found in the Hertfordshire and Oxfordshire countryside observing a variety of birds. In an interview in 2018 he stated, "it's not just the thrill of spotting the birds, but it's their vibrant colours, their peaceful, innocent nature and the sounds are a real inspiration and source of melody."

== Early solo work ==
Before releasing music with Friendly Fires, Macfarlane released electronic music under his own name, including the Modelwork EP with Precinct Recordings.

== Style of dancing in Friendly Fires ==
While Macfarlane sings lead vocals and plays bass guitar and synth during Friendly Fires' live performances, it is his style of dancing that has received much of the attention surrounding their gigs. His dancing style was described by a punter at one of the band's earliest American shows at the Glass House in Pomona, California, on 23 August 2009 like this: "Seriously. He's shaking it like I have NEVER seen it shaken before. Not just for one song, but for the entire night. He's putting every dirty dancer, everyone who's ever freaked like a freak on the floor, to utter and total shame. He's stuntin' like your daddy up there, from the very first second of the show, and all the while he's singing like his life depended on it."

Macfarlane's style of seemingly inexhaustible, conga-inspired dancing during the band's festival appearances and gigs has become legendary and customary at all their performances. In April 2009, the band performed at their first Coachella Festival, and despite the heat, the Friendly Fires frontman didn't disappoint fans, giving it his all: "I remember having about six bottles of water next to my synthesiser. It was painfully hot, and I still have to dance to our music and I still have to get into it. After one song, you feel shrivelled up like a raisin. You have to keep hydrating yourself. The crowd were great, the tent was completely rammed."

== Notable collaborations ==
He is friends with Alex Frankel and Nick Millhiser of New York City electronic duo Holy Ghost!. It was this friendship that led to their respective bands to release a split 12" single in March 2010. It has been rumoured that the initial idea to collaborate was hatched when the two bands performed and partied together at the 2009 Calvi on the Rocks summer music festival on the French island of Corsica. On the 12", Friendly Fires covered Holy Ghost!'s "Hold On"; Holy Ghost! covered Friendly Fires' "On Board". The 12" also included instrumental versions of both songs; the download version of the 12" included a dub version of Holy Ghost!'s "On Board".

Macfarlane contributed lead vocals to New York City-based producer FaltyDL's track "She Sleeps", which appears on the producer's 2013 album Hardcourage. Macfarlane's vocals also feature on English electronic duo Disclosure's track "Defeated No More", which appears on the brother act's 2013 Mercury Prize-nominated debut album Settle.

In 2016, MacFarlane appeared on English duo Dusky's second album, Outer, lending his vocals for "Tiers". He was uncredited.

Also in 2016, MacFarlane and Friendly Fires bandmate Edd Gibson formed a partnership with The Advisory Circle's Cate Brooks to release an LP under the group name The Pattern Forms, entitled "Peeling Away The Ivy" for the Ghost Box label. Described as "A balance of powerful pop hooks and sonic experimentation that masterfully evoke the melancholy of lost summers and lonely outsider reveries", Peeling Away the Ivy represented a stark departure from MacFarlane's past work.
