= Jimmy Edgar =

American conceptual artist and electronic musician

- Known for: Conceptual art; Sculpture; Digital art; Electronic music
- Website: void.work

Jimmy Edgar is an American conceptual artist, electronic music producer and sound designer from Detroit, Michigan. His work encompasses music, sculpture and generative art, with an interest in the relationship between digital images and physical objects. His studio albums include Color Strip (2006), XXX (2010), Majenta (2012), Cheetah Bend (2021) and Liquids Heaven (2022).

== Early life ==
Edgar grew up in Roseville, Michigan, in the Detroit area.

== Music ==
Edgar's first release on Warp was the 2004 four-track EP Access Rhythm, which was shortly followed by the six-track EP Bounce, Make, Model. He released the full-length album as Color Strip in February 2006. Pitchfork's Mark Richardson described the album as combining Detroit electronic music traditions with contemporary production.

XXX was released on !K7 Records in 2010. Edgar toured internationally during this period. In 2012, he released Majenta on Hotflush Recordings.

His EP Hot Inside was released by Ultramajic in 2013. By late 2013, Edgar was based in Berlin and also working in Los Angeles. In 2014, he recorded a BBC Radio 1 Essential Mix and the 90-minute mix RA.401 for Resident Advisor.

In 2016, he released the EP Dreamz Come True, whose title track features Rochelle Jordan. Edgar produced "745" on Vince Staples' 2017 album Big Fish Theory. He developed a long-running collaboration with SOPHIE, exchanging synthesizer sounds and working on recordings together from around 2010. In 2018, he released "Burn So Deep" with Dawn Richard.

Cheetah Bend, released by Innovative Leisure in 2021, was Edgar's first solo studio album since Majenta. Its collaborators include Danny Brown, Hudson Mohawke and SOPHIE. In his interview with Paper, Edgar connected the album's shift toward rap and R&B songwriting with his move from Berlin to Los Angeles. Liquids Heaven followed in November 2022. The album combines hip-hop, electronic music, soul and noise, with guest vocalists including Trinidad James, Zelooperz and LIZ.

== Visual art ==
Edgar's visual practice includes digital images, sculpture, and computer-generated compositions. His PLASTICS series, released in 2022, used stock photographs and generated compositions and titles through JavaScript programs. Oxygen, Edgar's first solo exhibition, was held at Vellum LA in Los Angeles from August 11 to September 11, 2022. Curated by Alice Scope and Sinziana Velicescu, it presented 13 digital works incorporating representations of beach balls, epoxy and consumer appliances. The exhibition also included a sculpture consisting of air enclosed in a glass case. REDEFINE reported that the work was auctioned for US$26,000.

== Discography ==
=== Studio albums ===
Studio albums
| Year | Title | Label |
|---|---|---|
| 2021 | Cheetah Bend | Innovative Leisure |

=== Selected EPs ===
Selected EPs
| Year | Title | Label |
|---|---|---|
| 2009 | Funktion of Your Love | Items & Things |
| 2012 | This One's for the Children | Hotflush Recordings |
| 2014 | Saline | Ultramajic |
| 2015 | Shine | Ultramajic |
| 2016 | Dreamz Come True | Ultramajic |
