= Friendly Fires =

English indie rock band

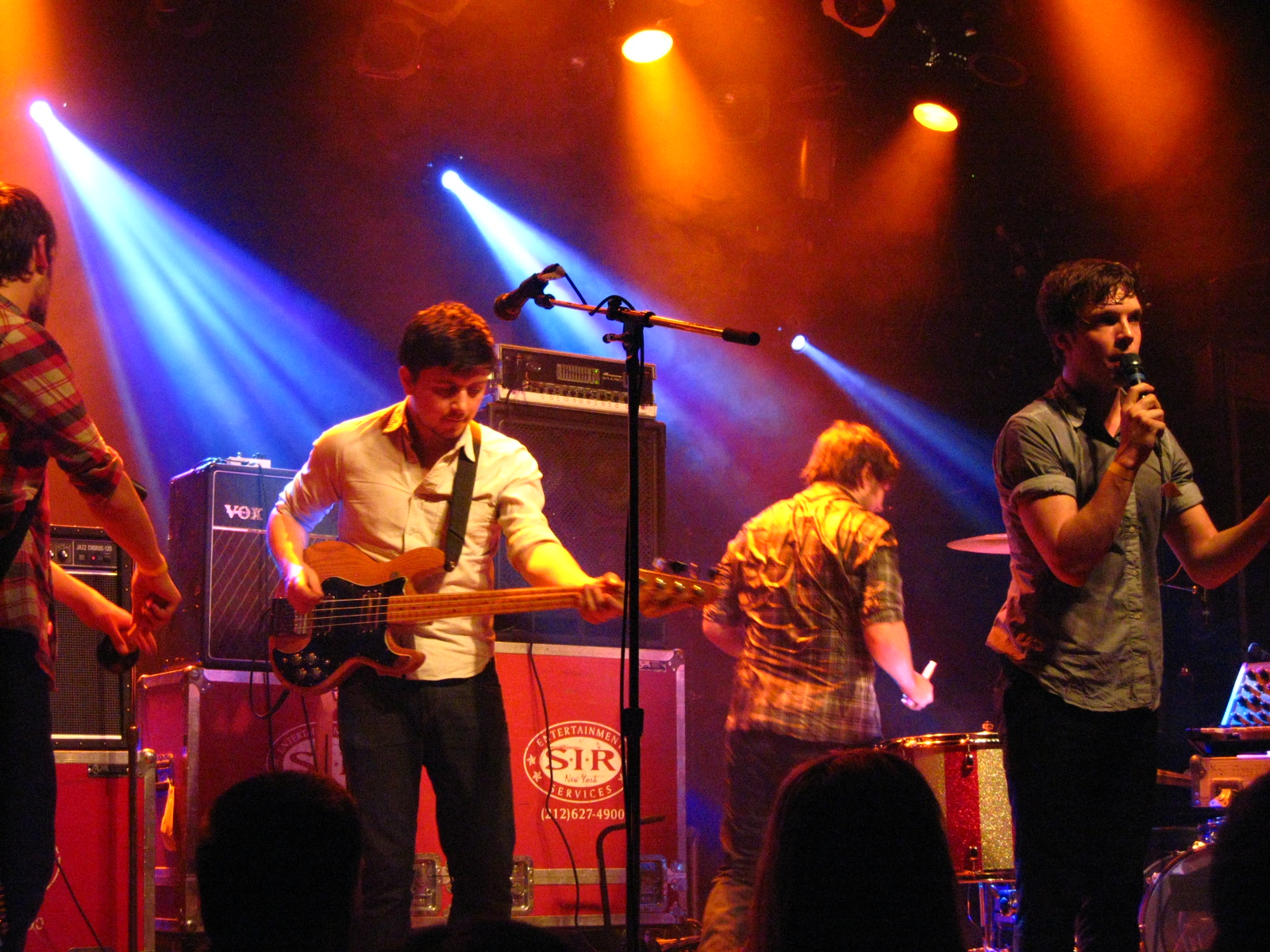

Background information
- Origin: St Albans, Hertfordshire, England
- Genres: Indie rock; indietronica; nu-disco; dance-punk; shoegazing; funk
- Years active: 2006–2014; 2017–present
- Labels: LAB; XL; Polydor
- Members: Ed Macfarlane; Edd Gibson
- Past members: Jack Savidge

Friendly Fires are an English indie rock band from St Albans, Hertfordshire. The band consists of vocalist Ed Macfarlane and guitarist Edd Gibson; drummer Jack Savidge was part of the band until his departure in 2026. They are best known for their self-titled debut album, which was released on 1 September 2008 and was announced as one of the shortlisted twelve for the 2009 Mercury Prize on 21 July 2009. The band formed in 2006 and released two studio albums before parting ways in 2014. They reunited three years later, ultimately releasing their third album Inflorescent in 2019. The band recently announced their fourth album Dig Deeper to be released on 15 January 2027.

== History ==
Friendly Fires met at St Albans School. At the age of 13, in year eight and nine (the second or third year), the members formed their first band, a post-hardcore outfit called First Day Back, covering songs by Green Day and other rock-like artists, which existed until they began university. During this time, lead singer Ed Macfarlane released his own music (under his own name) through the electronica label Skam, and Precinct Recordings. Upon leaving university, they formed a new band inspired by dance music, "lush shoegaze melodies", and classic pop songwriting. The name Friendly Fires originates from the opening track of the Section 25 LP Always Now. The band considers German techno label Kompakt, Carl Craig and Prince to be their greatest influences.

In late 2007, they became the first unsigned band to appear on Channel 4's Transmission programme. Their single "Paris" achieved "Single of the Week" in The Guardian newspaper, NME magazine, and also on Zane Lowe's BBC Radio 1 show. They have toured extensively, with past performances and festival appearances throughout the UK, Europe, Japan, the US, Canada, Mexico, South America and Australia.

=== Friendly Fires (2008–11) ===
In May 2008, their song "On Board" was featured in North American television commercials for Nintendo's Wii Fit. "On Board" is also featured in the trailer for the PlayStation 3 game Gran Turismo 5. "White Diamonds" is featured in one of the episodes in the second season of the American television series Gossip Girl. "Jump in the Pool" is the theme tune to BBC One's final score for the 2009–10 football season, aired on Saturday afternoons. "In the Hospital", and "Lovesick", are featured in the Microsoft Windows, Xbox 360 and PlayStation 3 driving game Colin McRae: Dirt 2. "Lovesick" is played on Soccer AM as the week's football fixtures are announced.

In September 2008, they released their first LP: Friendly Fires, featuring the singles "On Board", "Paris", "Jump in the Pool", and "Skeleton Boy". The enhanced two-disc version of the album, released on 31 August 2009, included new summer single "Kiss of Life", earlier songs "Relationships" and "Bored of Each Other", other various remixes, and a DVD of their live performance of the band's at London's HMV Forum on 15 May 2009.

The album was certified double gold in the UK; the band was nominated for a Best Breakthrough Award at The South Bank Show Awards and for Best Dancefloor Filler at the NME Awards. They were also second on the bill on the Shockwaves NME Awards Tour in January and February 2009, playing alongside headliner Glasvegas and other up-and-coming bands White Lies and Florence and the Machine. In March 2009, Friendly Fires co-headlined with White Lies on an American equivalent of the tour called NME Presents, with The Soft Pack supporting.

On 21 July 2009, Friendly Fires was nominated for the Mercury Music Prize. They lost to Speech Debelle's Speech Therapy.

On 19 January 2010, the band was nominated for two Brit Awards: Best British Group and British Breakthrough Act.

On 8 March 2010, Friendly Fires released a split 12" single with their New York city friends Holy Ghost!. Friendly Fires covered Holy Ghost!'s "Hold On"; Holy Ghost! covered Friendly Fires' "On Board". The 12" also included instrumental versions of both songs; the download version of the 12" included a dub version of Holy Ghost!'s "On Board".

Friendly Fires have contributed the soundtrack to the Frank Miller-directed TV advertisement for 'Guilty', a women's fragrance by Gucci. It was a cover of the Depeche Mode song "Strangelove".

On 27 September 2010, Friendly Fires released through Rough Trade Records a special compilation with London club promoters Bugged Out! called Bugged Out Presents Suck My Deck. The 19 songs included on the album were 18 songs, including remixes of songs by Phenomenal Handclap Band and Lindstrom and Christabelle handpicked by the band and "Stay Here", a collaboration between the band and Azari & III.

=== Pala and hiatus (2011–2014) ===
In May 2011, their second album Pala was released. The first single was "Live Those Days Tonight", soon followed by "Hawaiian Air". On 16 August of that year, Friendly Fires announced that their trumpet player, Richard Turner, who contributed to their live shows, had died. Turner had suffered a cardiac arrest while swimming on 11 August 2011. At the end of 2011, Friendly Fires played their biggest UK tour to date, starting in Brighton on 10 November, and performing in cities, such as Birmingham, Newcastle, Glasgow and London. An ongoing illness of singer Ed Macfarlane's caused several of these gigs to be rescheduled for December 2011.

Friendly Fires headlined the inaugural ABLE2UK charity concert for disabled awareness on 20 August 2012 at The Roundhouse in London. All proceeds from ticket sales went to ABLE2UK.

When asked in July 2012 by NME about their future direction, Macfarlane stated that the trio have no intentions of writing another pop record like Pala. They have been working with producer Andrew Weatherall and so far, they have come up with some dramatically different results to the band's usual output. Speaking to NME at Poland's Open'er Festival, Macfarlane said, "The music – the way we're writing and the style of it – is very different to anything we've done before; I think we're still learning to write music in a different way. We want to write something long and expansive and drawn-out and, I suppose, a bit more psychedelic." Macfarlane also confirmed that the tracks would definitely be released at some point, most probably under the band's name, "even if it is totally weird, psyched out, eight-minute long jams, we're still gonna call it Friendly Fires."

In 2016, Ed McFarlane and Edd Gibson collaborated with Jon Brooks (The Advisory Circle) under the name The Pattern Forms and released the album Peel Away the Ivy in October 2016.

=== Inflorescent (2018–present) ===
On 25 September 2017, the band announced on their Facebook page that they are returning and will be performing at O2 Academy Brixton on 5 April 2018. A 40-second clip of new music was added in a video along with the announcement. On 5 April 2018, the band released "Love Like Waves", their first release since 2012.

On 24 June 2019 the band announced their first album in eight years, Inflorescent. It was released on 16 August 2019 via Polydor Records.

In October 2022, the band announced a special one-off concert to celebrate the fifteenth anniversary of their self-titled debut album, to be held in February 2023. They subsequently added an additional date, and the initial idea ended up becoming a full-scale tour, which took place from August through December 2023 in the United Kingdom. In addition to the concerts, the band also re-issued their first album on LP, together with a re-issue of the "Paris" single on a gold vinyl, to commemorate the 15th anniversary of their debut.

In January 2025, the band played at Japan's Rockin’ on Sonic festival held at Makuhari Messe International Exhibition Hall in Chiba.

== Discography ==
=== Albums ===
==== Studio albums ====
Title	Details	Peak chart positions										Certifications (sales threshold)
Title	Details	UK	UK Indie	AUS	IRE	JPN	SCO	US	US Alt	US Indie	US Rock	Certifications (sales threshold)
Friendly Fires	Release date: 1 September 2008; Label: XL; Formats: CD, digital download, LP, streaming	21	2	92	50	56	31	—	—	—	—	BPI: Gold
Pala	Release date: 16 May 2011; Label: XL; Formats: CD, digital download, streaming	6	3	19	29	37	6	152	18	22	36	BPI: Silver
Inflorescent	Release date: 16 August 2019; Label: Polydor; Formats: LP, CD, cassette, digital download, streaming	15	—	—	—	—	14	—	—	—	—	
Dig Deeper	Scheduled release date: 15 January 2027; Label: LAB Records; Formats: LP, CD, digital download, streaming	To be released										
"—" denotes release did not chart in that territory.

==== DJ mix albums ====
Title	Details
Bugged Out! Presents Suck My Deck (Mixed by Friendly Fires)	Release date: 27 September 2010; Label: !K7; Formats: CD, digital download
Late Night Tales: Friendly Fires	Release date: 5 November 2012; Label: Late Night Tales; Formats: CD, digital download

=== EPs ===
Title	Details	Track listing
Photobooth	Released: 2006; Formats: CD, LP, digital download	Track list: 1. "Photobooth" – 7:08; 2. "It's Over Now" – 4:12; 3. "Your Love" – 4:45
Cross the Line EP	Released: 2007; Formats: CD, LP, digital download	Track list: 1. "Bring Out Your Dead" – 2:12; 2. "On Board" – 3:45; 3. "Strobe" – 3:09
The Remix EP	Released: 2007; Formats: CD, LP, digital download	Track list: 1. "On Board" (Nightmoves Remix) – 8:33; 2. "Photobooth" (Mock & Toof Mix) – 7:10; 3. "Bring Out Your Dead" (Clark Remix) – 3:37
Offline EP	Released: 22 Nov 2019; Formats: digital download	Track list: 1. "Offline" – 3:24; 2. "Offline" (PBR Streetgang Remix Edit) – 3:51; 3. "Tijuana" – 4:12; 4. "Run The Wild Flowers" (Icarus Remix) – 5:49; 5. "Dive into Your Eyes" – 4:40; 6. "Offline" (Cosmo’s Midnight Remix) – 3:06; 7. "Offline" (PBR Streetgang Remix) – 6:29

=== Singles ===
Single	Year	Peak chart positions							Certifications	Album
Single	Year	UK	UK Indie	BEL (FL) Tip	JPN	MEX Air.	SCO	SWI Air	Certifications	Album
"On Board"	2007	—	—	—	—	—	—	—		Friendly Fires (+ Deluxe)
"Paris"	2007	—	—	—	—	—	—	—		Friendly Fires (+ Deluxe)
"Jump in the Pool"	2008	100	—	—	—	—	—	—	BPI: Silver	Friendly Fires (+ Deluxe)
"Paris" (re-release)	2008	105	13	—	44	37	63	—		Friendly Fires (+ Deluxe)
"Skeleton Boy"	2009	48	34	—	—	—	—	—		Friendly Fires (+ Deluxe)
"Jump in the Pool" (re-release)	2009	57	7	—	—	—	—	—		Friendly Fires (+ Deluxe)
"Kiss of Life"	2009	30	4	—	—	17	—	—		Friendly Fires (+ Deluxe)
"Hold On"	2010	—	29	—	—	—	—	—		Friendly Fires / Holy Ghost! split 12"
"Live Those Days Tonight"	2011	80	11	—	40	33	84	—		Pala
"Hawaiian Air"	2011	92	9	—	—	28	87	—		Pala
"Blue Cassette"	2011	—	—	—	—	—	—	—		Pala
"Hurting"	2012	—	—	31	—	30	—	—		Pala
"Before Your Eyes" / "Velo" (with Asphodells)	2014	— (Note: "Before Your Eyes" did not enter the UK Single Chart, but peaked at number eight on the UK Physical Singles Chart Top 100.)	—	—	—	—	—	—		Non-album singles
"Love Like Waves"	2018	—	—	—	—	—	—	—		Inflorescent
"Heaven Let Me In"	2018	—	—	— (Note: "Heaven Let Me In" did not enter the Flanders Ultratop Top 50, but charted as an extra tip on the Flanders Ultratop Bubbling Under chart.)	—	—	—	—		Inflorescent
"Lack of Love"	2019	—	—	—	—	—	—	—		Inflorescent
"Silhouettes"	2019	—	—	—	—	—	—	87		Inflorescent
"Offline" (with Friend Within)	2019	—	—	—	—	—	—	—		Inflorescent
"Lose All Your Friends"	2026	—	—	—	—	—	—	—		
"Magnetic"	2026	—	—	—	—	—	—	—		
"—" denotes a recording that did not chart or was not released in that territory.

=== Other charting songs ===
Song	Year	Peak chart positions	Album
Song	Year	UK Indie	Album
"Bring Out Your Dead"	2007	41	Cross the Line EP
"Bored of Each Other"	2009	— (Note: "Bored of Each Other" did not enter the UK Independent Singles Chart, but peaked at number 11 on the UK Independent Single Breakers Chart.)	Friendly Fires (Deluxe Edition)
"Relationships"	2009	— (Note: "Relationships" did not enter the UK Independent Singles Chart, but peaked at number 19 on the UK Independent Single Breakers Chart.)	Friendly Fires (Deluxe Edition)

=== Guest appearances ===
Song	Year	Album
"Paris"	2009	Radio 1's Live Lounge – Volume 4
"Stay Here" (with Azari & III)	2010	Suck My Deck
