= 2020 UK Music Video Awards =

- Date: 5 November 2020
- Location: Virtual
- Hosted by: Becca Dudley
- Website: www.ukmva.com

The 2020 UK Music Video Awards were held on 5 November 2020 to recognise the best in music videos and music film making from United Kingdom and worldwide. The nominees were announced on 29 September 2020.

Four new categories were included, R&B/Soul Video (uk, international and newcomer) and Best Lockdown Video, to recognize videos produced during the lockdowns that took place during 2020. Due to the COVID-19 pandemic in the United Kingdom the ceremony was held virtually.

American producer DJ Shadow received the award for Video of the Year for "Rocket Fuel" alongside American hip-hop trio De La Soul, the video was directed by Sam Pilling. Below are the list of nominations, the winners are highlighted in bold.

== Video of the Year ==
Video of the Year
- **DJ Shadow featuring De La Soul - "Rocket Fuel"**
  **(Director: Sam Pilling)**

== Video Genre Categories ==
Best Pop Video - UK	Best Pop Video - International
**Dua Lipa - "Break My Heart"** **(Director: Henry Scholfield)**; Harry Styles - "Adore You" (Director: Dave Meyers); Lewis Capaldi - "Before You Go" (Director: Kyle Thrash); Ashnikko featuring Grimes - "Cry" (Director: Mike Anderson); Harry Styles - "Falling" (Director: Dave Meyers); Dua Lipa - "Physical" (Director: Lope Serrano aka CANADA)	**The Weeknd - "Blinding Lights"** **(Director: Anton Tammi)**; Rosalía - "A Palé" (Director: Jora Frantzis); Tove Lo featuring MC Zaac - "Are U Gonna Tell Her?" (Director: Alaska); Rosalía - "Juro Que" (Director: Tanu Muino); BTS - "ON" (Director: Lumpens (Yongseok Choi)); Rosalía and Travis Scott - "TKN" (Director: Nicolás Méndez aka CANADA)
Best Rock Video - UK	Best Rock Video - International
**IDLES - "War"** **(Director: Will Dohrn)**; Sam Fender - "Borders" (Director: Thomas James); Michael Kiwanuka - "Hero" (Director: CC Wade); The 1975 - "People" (Director: Warren Fu); Declan McKenna - "The Key to Life on Earth" (Director: Will Hoopen); Coldplay - "Trouble In Town" (Director: Aoife Mcardle)	**Joywave - "Obsession"** **(Director: Dimitri Basil, Laura Gorun, Cooper Roussel)**; Håkan Hellström - "Alla drömmar är uppfyllda" (Director: Filip Nilsson); The Strokes - "Bad Decisions" (Director: Andrew Donoho); Broken Bells - "Good Luck" (Directors: Kimberly Stuckwisch & Nelson de Castro); The Strokes - "Ode to the Mets" (Director: Warren Fu); Leonard Cohen - "The Hills" (Director: Vincent Haycock)
Best Alternative Video - UK	Best Alternative Video - International
**Låpsley - "My Love Was Like The Rain"** **(Director: Camille Summers-Vallisfcoi)**; Ghostpoet - "Concrete Pony" (Director: Thomas James); Thom Yorke - "Last I Heard (...He Was Circling the Drain)" (Directors: Art Camp & Saad Moosajee); FKA Twigs - "sad day" (Director: Hiro Murai); Moses Boyd - "Stranger Than Fiction" (Director: In/Out); Mura Masa featuring Ellie Rowsell - "Teenage Headache Dreams" (Director: Marcus Söderlund)	**Agoria - "Call of the Wild"** **(Director: Loïc Andrieu)**; Moses Sumney - "Cut Me" (Director: Moses Sumney); Meryem Aboulouafa - "Deeply" (Directors: Zhang & Knight); Ferran Palau - "Flora & Caic" (Director: Pablo Maestres); Woodkid - "Goliath" (Director: Yoann Lemoine); Sheenah Ko - "Wrap Me Up" (Directors: Vincent René-Lortie & Brittney Canda)
Best Dance/Electronic Video - UK	Best Dance/Electronic Video - International
**Disclosure featuring Aminé & slowthai - "My High"** **(Director: Simon Cahn)**; Waze & Odyssey, George Michael, Mary J. Blige and Tommy Theo - "Always" (Director: Nelson de Castro); Prospa - "Control the Party" (Director: Jak Payne); Mura Masa & slowthai - "Deal Wiv It" (Director: Yoni Lappin); Disclosure - "Energy" (Director: Kid Studio); Duke Dumont with Zak Abel - "My Power" (Director: Paco Raterta)	**Salvatore Ganacci - "Boycycle"** **(Director: Vedran Rupic)**; Flight Facilities - "Better Than Ever" (Director: Tom Noakes); Piero Pirupa - "Brainhead (Heroin Kills)" (Director: Yousef); Bronson - "Keep Moving" (Director: Stylerwar); Chris Liebing and Charlotte de Witte - "Liquid Slow" (Director: Nogari); Brodinski featuring ZelooperZ - "Master Selection" (Director: Matilda Finn)
Best Hip Hop/Grime/Rap Video - UK	Best Hip Hop/Grime/Rap Video - International
**Jme featuring Merky ACE - "Live"** **(Director: Matthew Walker)**; Stormzy featuring Headie One - "Audacity" (Director: Taz Tron Delix); Headie One & Fred Again - "Gang" (Director: Arnaud Bresson); Avelino - "Higher Power" (Director: Nadira Amrani); Octavian - "Poison" (Director: Crowns & Owls); slowthai - "Psycho" (Director: Duncan Loudon)	**DJ Shadow featuring De La Soul - "Rocket Fuel"** **(Director: Sam Pilling)**; Flatbush Zombies - "Afterlife" (Director: Arnaud Bresson); A$AP Rocky - "Babushka Boi" (Director: Nadia Lee Cohen); Future featuring Drake - "Life Is Good" (Director: Julien Christian Lutz); Run the Jewels featuring DJ Premier and Greg Nice - "Ooh La La" (Directors: Brian Beletic & Vanessa Beletic); Tommy Cash - "Sdubid" (Directors: Tommy Cash & Anna Himma)
Best R&B/Soul Video - UK	Best R&B/Soul Video - International
**Berwyn - "Trap Phone"** **(Director: Brock Neal Roberts)**; Jorja Smith - "By Any Means" (Directors: Otis Dominique & Ellington Hammond); FKA Twigs featuring Future - "Holy Terrain" (Directors: FKA twigs & Nich Walker); Olivia Dean - "Password Change" (Director: Stella Scott); Celeste - "Stop This Flame" (Director: Leonn Ward); Lola Young - "Woman" (Director: Oliva Rose)	**Yseult - "Corps"** **(Director: Colin Solal Cardo)**; Tiwa Savage - "49-99" (Director: Meji Alabi); Beyoncé, Shatta Wale and Major Lazer - "Already" (Directors: Beyoncé, Pierre Debusschere & Kwasi Fordjour); 070 Shake - "Nice to Have" (Director: Noah Lee); Gregory Porter - "Revival" (Director: Douglas Bernardt); Marvin Gaye - "What's Going On" (Director: Savanah Leaf)
Best Pop Video - Newcomer	Best Rock Video - Newcomer
**Vagabon - "In a Bind"** **(Director: Maegan Houang)**; Babeheaven - "Cassette Beat" (Director: Margot Bowman); Ashnikko - "Drunk with My Friends" (Director: Claire Arnold); Nick Wilson - "Enough to Know You" (Directors: Bjorn Franklin & Johnny Marchetta); filous - "Monday" (Director: Tobias Pichler); Raine Allen-Miller - "Wank Wiggle" (Director: Raine Allen-Miller)	**Willie J Healey - "True Stereo"** **(Director: Joe Wheatley)**; The Academic - "Act My Age" (Directors: Ronan Corrigan & Hope Kemp); Sports Team - "Camel Crew" (Directors: Sports Team & Ben Unwin); beabadoobee - "I Wish I Was Stephen Malkmus" (Director: Bedroom); Dream Wife - "So When You Gonna..." (Director: Aidan Zamiri); Kid Kapichi - "Thugs" (Director: James Green)
Best Alternative Video - Newcomer	Best Dance/Electronic Video - Newcomer
**Zebra Katz - "Moor"** **(Director: Žanete Skarule and Ojay Morgan)**; María José Llergo - "A Través de Ti" (Director: Alex Gargot); Alaskan Tapes - "And, We Disappear" (Director: Meredith Hama-Brown); Midnight Tracks - "Anymore" (Director: Marleen Valien); L'Homme Statue - "Braços/Vela" (Director: Douglas Bernardt); LL Burns - "Get Me Back In The Game" (Director: CC Wade)	**Mild Minds featuring Boats - "Walls"** **(Director: Colin Read)**; Leifur James - AAID" (Directors: Balázs Simon & Dávid Dell'edera); Samaran - "Allo" (Director: Cédric Legrand); Raven - "Cass & Lex" (Director: Phillip Kaminiak); Akwasi - "Extase" (Director: Florian Joahn); Saavan - "In My Head" (Directors: Valentin Meaux & Lucas Mokrani)
Best Hip Hop/Grime/Rap Video - Newcomer	Best R&B/Soul Video - Newcomer
**Jurdan Bryant - "Words For Thomas"** **(Director: Alonzo Hellerbach)**; Louis Culture - "Being Me" (Director: Milo Blake); Spxxn P - "Complicació" (Director: Pere Sala); KAM-BU featuring Lord Apex - "Different" (Director: Milo Blake); Meekz - "Like Me" (Director: KC Locke); Flohio - "WAY2" (Directors: Ethan & Tom)	**Greentea Peng - "Mr Sun (miss da sun)"** **(Director: Felix Brady)**; Jeshi featuring Celeste - "30,000 Feet" (Director: Charlie Robins); Arlo Parks - "Black Dog" (Director: Molly Burdett); Black Square featuring Laville - "Coral Blues" (Director: Luke Tierney); Fredwave - "Dust" (Director: Brock Neal-Roberts); Ni Houston featuring Darius Raheem - "Gemini" (Director: Alban Coret)

== Craft and Technical Categories ==
Best Production Design in a Video	Best Styling in a Video
**Tommy Cash - "Sdubid"** **(Production Designer: Taivi Lippmaa)**; Michael Kiwanuka - "Hero" (Production Designer: Daniel Taylor); Dua Lipa - "Physical" (Production Designer: Anna Colomer Nogué); Eden - "Projector" (Production Designer: Lora Venkova); DJ Shadow featuring De La Soul - "Rocket Fuel" (Production Designer: Vlad Ryzhykov); AIGEL - "You're Born" (Production Designer: Juljia Friscone-Gavriss)	**Beyoncé, Shatta Wale and Major Lazer - "Already"** **(Stylist: Zerina Akers)**; Tiwa Savage - "49-99" (Stylist: Daniel Obasi); Raleigh Ritchie - "Aristocrats" (Stylist: Jodie-Simone Howe); Yves Tumor - "Gospel For A New Century" (Stylists: Nick Royal & Tara Greville); Michael Kiwanuka - "Hero" (Stylist: Verity May Lane); Dua Lipa - "Physical" (Stylists: Lorenzo Posocco, Adrian Bernal & Laura Vandall)
Best Choreography in a Video	Best Cinematography in a Video
**Sheenah Ko - "Wrap Me Up"** **(Choreographer: Brittney Canda)**; Beyoncé, Shatta Wale and Major Lazer - "Already" (Choreographers: Jaquel Knight, Stephen Ojo & Caleb Bonney); Waze & Odyssey, George Michael, Mary J. Blige and Tommy Theo - "Always" (Choreographer: Monika Felice Smith); Tove Lo featuring MC Zaac - "Are U Gonna Tell Her?" (Choreographer: José Henrique de Lima Pereira); Christine and the Queens - "La Vita Nuova" (Choreographer: Ryan Heffington); Jessie Ware - "Step Into My Life" (Choreographer: Eric Schloesser)	**FKA Twigs - "sad day"** **(Director of Photography: Larkin Seiple)**; The Weeknd - "Blinding Lights" (Director of Photography: Oliver Millar); Ferran Palau - "Flora & Caic" (Director of Photography: Marc Miró); DJ Shadow featuring De La Soul - "Rocket Fuel" (Director of Photography: Rina Yang); IDLES - "War" (Director of Photography: Harry Wheeler); AIGEL - "You're Born" (Director of Photography: Andrey Nokolaev)
Best Color Grading in a Video	Best Editing in a Video
**DJ Shadow featuring De La Soul - "Rocket Fuel"** **(Colourist: Thomas Mangham)**; The Weeknd - "Blinding Lights" (Colourist: Nicke Cantarelli); Dua Lipa - "Break My Heart" (Colourist: Luke Morrison @ Electric Theatre Collective); Woodkid - "Goliath" (Colourist: Matthieu Caplane @ Firm); Michael Kiwanuka - "Hero" (Colourist: Simon Bourne @ Framestore); Eden - "Projector" (Colourist: Daniel de Vue @ a52)	**DJ Shadow featuring De La Soul - "Rocket Fuel"** **(Editor: Ellie Johnson)**; Jorja Smith - "By Any Means" (Editor: James Demetriou); Raven - "Cass & Lax" (Editor: Sander Houtkruijer); Disclosure featuring Aminé & slowthai - "My High" (Editor: Yorgos Lamprinos); Dua Lipa - "Physical" (Editor: Carlos Font Clos); IDLES - "War" (Editor: Will Dohrn)
Best Visual Effects in a Video	Best Animation in a Video
**Flatbush Zombies - "After Life"** **(VFX Artist: Machine Molle)**; Dua Lipa - "Break My Heart" (VFX Artist: Jim Allen @ No 8 London); Taylor Swift - "cardigan" (VFX Artist: Ingenuity Studios); Woodkid - "Goliath" (VFX Artist: Firm x Faubourg & Yoann Lemoine); Bronson - "Keep Moving" (VFX Artist: Stylewar @ The Mill LA); FKA Twigs - "sad day" (VFX Artist: Michael Gregory, Toya Drechsler & Corinne Deorsay @ MPC LA)	**Ghetts featuring Jaykae and Moonchild Sanelly - "Mozambique"** **(Animator: Ruff Mercy)**; Jorja Smith - "Come Over" (Animator: Future Power Station: Yibi Hu, Geoff Parsons, Sykosan, Krystian Garstkowiak, Rafaila Raykova, Adam Relf, Fali MC, Eric Dias, Andy McPherson, Daryl Graham, Krisi Zhupali, Judit Boor, Katie Spangenberg, Kevin O'Shea, Simon Graham); Coldplay - "Daddy" (Animator: Timon Dowdeswell & Henrique Barone; Puppeteers: Andy Brunskill, Jimmy Grimes & Katie Williams); Moby - "My Only Love" (Animator: Paulo Garcia @ Zombie Studio); Max Cooper - "Repetition" (Animator: Kevin McGloughlin); Yusuf/Cat Stevens - "Where Do the Children Play?" (Animator: Chris Hopewell)

== Special Video Categories ==
Best Live Video	Best Lockdown Video
**The Weeknd - "Heartless (Live)"** **(Director: Alex Lill)**; The Weeknd - "Blinding Lights (Live)" (Director: Alex Lill); Dua Lipa - "Don't Start Now (Live In L.A., 2019)" (Director: Daniel Carberry); Tom Misch and Yussef Dayes - "Lift Off" (Director: Douglas Bernardt); Michael Kiwanuka - "Live At The Mildmay Club" (Director: Huse Monfaradi); Charlie Winston - "Lost in the Memory" (Director: Ian Roderick Gray)	**Bronson - "KeepMoving"** **(Director: Stylewar)**; Glass Animals - "Dreamland" (Director: Colin Read); Gracey featuring Ruel - "Empty Love" (Director: Aidan Zamiri); C. Tangana - "Guille Asesino" (Director: Diana Kunst); Anderson .Paak - "Lockdown" (Director: Dave Meyers); LYR Featuring Florence Pugh and Melt Yourself Down - "Lockdown (in aid of Refuge)" (Director: Daniel Broadley)
Best Special Video Project	Best Music Film
**Riz Ahmed - "The Long Goodbye"** **(Director: Aneil Karia)**; J.Views featuring Instagram - "Featuring" (Director: Vico Sharabani & Jonathan Dagan); MASN - "How To Kill a Rockstar" (Director: Brendan Vaughan); Christine and the Queens - "La vita nuova" (Director: Colin Solal Cardo); Nightmares on Wax - "Smoker's Delight" (Director: Janie Whitby); French Kiwi Juice - "They Saw The Sun First" (Director: Stefan Hunt)	**The Streets - "None Of Us Are Getting Out Of This LIVE Alive (Livestream)"** **(Director: James Barnes)**; Ludovico Einaudi - "Apple Music Live from The Steve Jobs Theatre"; Beastie Boys - "Beastie Boys Story"; Miles Davis: Birth of the Cool; Beyoncé - "Black Is King"; Mark Ronson - "From The Heart"

== Individual and Company Categories ==
Best Director	Best New Director
**Anton Tammi**; Crowns & Owls; Dave Meyers; Diana Kunst; Henry Scholfield; Zhang & Knight	**Arnaud Bresson**; Brock Neal-Roberts; Douglas Bernardt; Jocelyn Anquetil; KC Locke; Will Hooper
Best Commissioner	Best Producer
**Caroline Clayton**; Kat Cattaneo; Nicola Sheppard; Sam Seager; Scott Wright; Semera Khan	**Daniella Manca**; Horace de Gunzbourg; Kareem Adeshina; Karen Saurí; Luke Tierney; Mayling Wong
Best Production Company	Best Post-Production Company
**Somesuch**; Blink; CANADA; COMPULSORY; Division; FRIEND	**The Mill**; Black Kite Studios; CHEAT; Electric Theatre Collective; Ingenuity Studios; tenthree
Best Agent
**Claire Stubbs**; Andy Roberts; Barnaby Laws; Joceline Gabriel; Lee Fairweather; Sam Davey
