= Know Your Worth =

2020 single by Khalid and Disclosure

Single by Khalid and Disclosure

from the album Energy (Deluxe edition)
- Released: February 4, 2020
- Recorded: 2019
- Genre: Dance
- Length: 3:01
- Label: RCA
- Songwriters: Khalid Robinson; Guy Lawrence; James Napier
- Producer: Disclosure

Khalid singles chronology
"Eleven" (2020)	"Know Your Worth" (2020)	"Experience" (2020)

Disclosure singles chronology
"Where You Come From" (2018)	"Know Your Worth" (2020)	"Ecstasy" (2020)

Music video
- "Know Your Worth" on YouTube

"Know Your Worth" is a song by American singer Khalid and English duo Disclosure. It was released as a single through RCA Records on February 4, 2020. It appears on the deluxe version of Disclosure's third studio album, Energy (2020). Following the 2019 song "Talk", the song marks the second collaboration between the singer and the duo.

A remix with an additional feature from Davido and Tems was released in 2020.

== Background and promotion ==
About the song, Khalid revealed that he feels like "the message in this song is something that I needed to hear at the time I was writing it and I hope that it resonates with a lot of people who need to hear that kind of message". Khalid announced the song through social media on January 24, 2020. The announcement was accompanied by the cover art which depicts the upper half of his face in a turquoise blue light and a clip of the chorus of the song. The song was used by Levi's for a campaign video of XX Chino.

== Critical reception ==
Alex Nino Gheciu of Complex described the song as "a self-empowerment jam" which "is a decidedly more upbeat, dancefloor-ready affair" compared to his previous single "Eleven". Stereogum's Chris DeVille thought that the track is by no means a ""Talk" redux" but "a subtly propulsive, bass-heavy dance track" which "is far closer to the top of his discography than the bottom". Michael Saponara at Billboard noted that the singer "floats over the soft electronic production with a message for a certain lover".

== Charts ==
=== Weekly charts ===
Chart (2020)	Peak position
Australia (ARIA)	31
Austria (Ö3 Austria Top 40)	69
Belgium (Ultratip Bubbling Under Flanders)	6
Belgium (Ultratip Bubbling Under Wallonia)	3
Canada Hot 100 (Billboard)	46
Canada CHR/Top 40 (Billboard)	19
Canada Hot AC (Billboard)	37
Czech Republic Airplay (ČNS IFPI)	62
Czech Republic Singles Digital (ČNS IFPI)	67
Estonia (Eesti Tipp-40)	22
Ireland (IRMA)	25
Lithuania (AGATA)	28
Netherlands (Dutch Top 40)	19
Netherlands (Single Top 100)	28
New Zealand (Recorded Music NZ)	31
Norway (VG-lista)	40
Portugal (AFP)	70
Romania (Airplay 100)	63
Scotland Singles (OCC)	28
Slovakia Singles Digital (ČNS IFPI)	53
Sweden (Sverigetopplistan)	64
Switzerland (Schweizer Hitparade)	51
UK Singles (OCC)	27
US Billboard Hot 100	57
US Adult Pop Airplay (Billboard)	39
US Hot R&B/Hip-Hop Songs (Billboard)	26
US Pop Airplay (Billboard)	18
US Rhythmic Airplay (Billboard)	26
US Rolling Stone Top 100	46

=== Year-end charts ===
Chart (2020)	Position
Australia (ARIA)	62
Canada (Canadian Hot 100)	100
Netherlands (Single Top 100)	93
US Hot R&B Songs (Billboard)	19

== Certifications ==
Region	Certification	Certified units/sales
Australia (ARIA)	Platinum	70,000^{‡}
Brazil (Pro-Música Brasil)	Platinum	40,000^{‡}
Canada (Music Canada)	Platinum	80,000^{‡}
Denmark (IFPI Danmark)	Gold	45,000^{‡}
France (SNEP)	Gold	100,000^{‡}
New Zealand (RMNZ)	2× Platinum	60,000^{‡}
Poland (ZPAV)	Gold	10,000^{‡}
Portugal (AFP)	Gold	5,000^{‡}
United Kingdom (BPI)	Platinum	600,000^{‡}
^{‡} Sales+streaming figures based on certification alone.

== Release history ==
Region	Date	Format	Label	Ref.
Various	February 4, 2020	Digital download; streaming	RCA	
United States	March 16, 2020	Hot adult contemporary radio	RCA	
