= Douha (Mali Mali) =

Song by Disclosure and Fatoumata Diawara

Single by Disclosure and Fatoumata Diawara

from the album Energy
- Released: 29 July 2020
- Length: 4:55
- Label: Island; Universal
- Songwriter(s): Fatoumata Diawara; Guy Lawrence; Howard Lawrence
- Producer(s): Disclosure

Disclosure singles chronology
"My High" (2020)	"Douha (Mali Mali)" (2020)	"Birthday" (2020)

Fatoumata Diawara singles chronology
"Désolé" (2020)	"Douha (Mali Mali)" (2020)

Music video
- "Douha (Mali Mali)" on YouTube

"Douha (Mali Mali)" is a song by the English band Disclosure and Malian singer-songwriter Fatoumata Diawara. It was released as the fifth single from the duo's third studio album Energy on 29 July 2020.

== Background ==
The song is about Diawara's hometown, which is in the lyrics, "When you go to my home country/There is unity in my home-country/There is harmony and love in my home-country/There is brotherhood in my home-country."

In a video shared on Disclosure's YouTube channel approximately two weeks after the song's release, Diawara explains that "douha" means "prayer", and that the song itself is a cry for help on behalf of her country. Mali, a diverse and historically conflict-laden West African republic, underwent a coup d'état just a mere week after the track came out.

== Music video ==
The video shows Diawara and others dancing in places around the globe. Mahaneela, the director, wanted to make the video beautiful and symbolic. The video was filmed in three countries.

== Track listing ==
Digital download and streaming
No.	Title	Length
1.	"Douha (Mali Mali) (edit)"	2:52
2.	"Douha (Mali Mali)"	4:55

== Credits and personnel ==
Credits adapted from Tidal.

- Guy Lawrence – producer, composer, lyricist, associated performer, mixer, programming, and studio personnel
- Howard Lawrence – producer, composer, lyricist, associated performer, and programming
- Fatoumata Diawara – composer, lyricist, associated performer, and vocals
- Stuart Hawkes – mastering engineer and studio personnel

== Charts ==
Chart (2020)	Peak position
Belgium (Ultratip Bubbling Under Flanders)	48
UK Dance (OCC)	20
UK Singles (OCC)	83
US Hot Dance/Electronic Songs (Billboard)	25

== Release history ==
Region	Date	Format	Label	Ref.
Various	29 July 2020	Digital download; streaming	Island; Universal	
United Kingdom	14 August 2020	Contemporary hit radio	Island; Universal	
