= Energy (Disclosure album) =

Studio album by Disclosure
- Released: 28 August 2020
- Recorded: 2018–2020
- Genre: House; garage; R&B
- Length: 43:02
- Label: Island
- Producer: Disclosure

Disclosure chronology
Ecstasy (2020)	Energy (2020)	Alchemy (2023)

Singles from Energy
- 1. "Know Your Worth" Released: 4 February 2020; 2. "Ecstasy" Released: 24 February 2020; 3. "Energy" Released: 21 May 2020; 4. "My High" Released: 3 July 2020; 5. "Douha (Mali Mali)" Released: 29 July 2020; 6. "Birthday" Released: 26 August 2020

Energy (stylised in all caps) is the third studio album by British electronic music duo Disclosure. It was released on 28 August 2020 through Island Records.

The album is their first full-length release since Caracal in 2015, and subsequently their first major release since Ecstasy, an EP consisting of five songs later included on the deluxe edition of Energy. The deluxe edition also includes the duo's two hit singles with American singer-songwriter Khalid, "Talk" (previously released on Khalid's second studio album Free Spirit) and "Know Your Worth". In addition, the album features collaborations with several singer-songwriters, including Kelis, Channel Tres, Aminé, Slowthai, Mick Jenkins, Fatoumata Diawara, Blick Bassy, Kehlani, Syd, and Common.

After experiencing delays, Energy was ultimately released in the summer of 2020 due to its "positive messages" that Disclosure hoped would resonate with people during the COVID-19 pandemic. The album received generally positive reviews from music critics, who complimented the duo's musical diversity and strong collaboration choices, though some highlighted lyrical weaknesses. Energy's sound has been described as house mixed with elements of dance, R&B, and international music such as African-influenced stylings.

The album was nominated for Best Dance/Electronic Album at the 63rd Annual Grammy Awards. The song "My High" was nominated for the Grammy Award for Best Dance Recording at the 2021 Grammy Awards.

== Background ==
Disclosure released Caracal in September 2015, "which helped to build their fanbase beyond Britain. There was a hint of "second-album syndrome", they say, in having to get something out quick to capitalise on the momentum. The guests, including the Weeknd and a then-ascending Lorde, coincided with their desire to ease the pace and lean into an R&B-indebted sound. It received mixed response critically, but was commercially fruitful – as Guy noted, "It took us to fucking Madison Square Garden!" Howard said, "I've learned a lot from looking back at that record as well. Musically, there are parts of the album that I cringe at a bit. There are parts that I over-thought and tried a bit too hard to be clever with or something. For this new album, we wanted to let go a bit more."

After playing 331 live shows between 2013 and 2016, the duo took time off in 2017, "which proved a blessing for the brothers. Guy traveled for several months in Southeast Asia. Howard, meanwhile, stayed in their hometown Reigate and had taken up farming." "I'm really glad we took that time off and we did do that for mental health reasons," Guy says. "I don't think we said it or explicitly, but we were drained and we needed inspiration for life and music to be drawn from outside of the process of touring. For our first two albums, and all the EPs and singles before that, I wouldn't say they were written in a 'rush', but definitely in a very short timeframe. They say have your whole lifetime to write your first album, but we didn't have that either time – and it felt right to do that. But this time we knew we had a solid fan base to rely on and wait for us."

In December 2018, Disclosure returned with the Moonlight EP.

== Concept ==
Disclosure said that "the thing that decided which songs made it and which songs didn't was that one word: energy. [...] It's called Energy, but not just because it's very upbeat and positive, it's because of the way the songs were formulated. [...] The word energy for us has much more to do with the energy in the room, and that was like the 10 minutes that can make or break a song."

== Development ==
Energy was written, recorded and finished in 2019, with Disclosure producing the album. Each song was created from scratch, and "every track was written really quickly. That's why we had to write so many songs because those ones don't come up every day. Or every week. Or every month." Howard added that "morale throughout the process was pretty high".

Disclosure wanted to "write like 200 songs and pick the ten best" for Energy. Thomas Smith of NME wrote the "frantic writing process defined the feel of this record. [Disclosure was] in the early stages of writing they had penned up to 200 songs and opted to push forward with those that came the quickest. Of the 200-strong collection they worked on, roughly 15% have been released across this album and recent accompanying EP Ecstasy."

In an interview with Esquire, Disclosure spoke about the album's progression: "The ones that made the cut were the ones that came around very quickly. It wasn't like, 'Oh, this one will work in the club; this one may be on the radio.' It was about having the most fun we can have in the studio, making songs when it's effortless, when something just pops up out of nowhere."

Guy said about the album's 'international' feel: "We definitely had in our minds that we needed to branch out for this record. All of mine and Howard's favorite artists that we both love rarely did the same thing twice. And Africa, with all of its incredibly diverse genres of music, was something that we hadn't really explored much. [...] It felt natural to go more percussive [for Energy]."

Howard also said, regarding working in a studio: "Our favorite way of working is we turn up with nothing and they turn up with nothing and we all make something from scratch at the same time. That way, we're all on the same page vibe-wise. If me and Guy come and sit down and Guy starts making a beat, I start playing some chords and writing the melodies with the person, it instantly allows us all to sync up."

== Composition ==
At 43 minutes, Energy is Disclosure's second-shortest album (their shortest is Alchemy, released in 2023, at 37 minutes). The standard edition album tracklist includes 11 songs. The deluxe edition album tracklist includes nine additional songs: Disclosure's five-song Ecstasy EP (originally released 28 February 2020), Khalid collaborations "Talk" and "Know Your Worth", and 2 remixes of sixth single "Birthday".

Energy showcases "a diasporic sound that foregrounds the origins of a plethora of musical genres", and "encouraged [Disclosure] to follow their instincts and embrace the melodies, choruses and beats that arrived the fastest." Thomas Smith of NME said "On Energy, they dip in and out of their own past, fusing together more primal moments with big names collabs – it's an eye-bugging, mind-boggling listen." The album's energy is "sultry", "vibey", and "emotional" with tracks by Syd, Kehlani, Blick Bassy and Mick Jenkins. Disclosure also reunited with Eric Thomas for this project, previously featured on "When a Fire Starts to Burn" from their first studio album Settle (2013).

=== Genres ===
With "singers rooted in African pop traditions", John Freeman of Rolling Stone called the album "one of the more exciting developments this time around." Madison Vain of Esquire called Energy "a percussive, hip-hop-inflected embrace of global music" and said it "might be the biggest dance album of 2020."

The main sound of Energy is rooted in "four-on-the-floor" house music, incorporating several subgenres of that style, as well as R&B and Afropop. As Slant Magazine writer Charles Lyons-Burt observed, "Collaborating with a guest list composed entirely of artists of color—most of them Black, two from Cameroon and Mali—and pulling from the long stylistic history of hip-hop, R&B, and Western African pop rock, brothers Guy and Howard Lawrence apply their distinct brand of house music to these myriad styles, syncing everything up into a combustible, richly layered party record." Jenessa Williams of DIY summarised the songs as taking "a keener focus on rap and Afrobeats." The album also finds Disclosure exploring drum and bass.

In response to questions about cultural appropriation, Guy said all the music samples used were followed to their roots, and that their musical collaborators were compensated properly for their work.

=== Songs ===
The "bubbling, playful and upbeat" opener "Watch Your Step" is "a charismatic breakbeat romp" that "morphs" into syndrum-assisted disco-house with "a thin layer of crispy distortion". Kelis "confirms her place as a dancefloor queen" over soulful-electronica and off-kilter synths. DJ Channel Tres "[oozes] confidence" with a "breathy purr" over the Daft Punk/Neptunes-evoking "Lavender". The disco-y song is fast-paced with an "intriguing, industrial-esque instrumental". "My High", featuring Aminé and Slowthai, is a "skittish" and "impressively relentless" samba-hip house song "intended to chivvy the dancefloor along into delirium", with a jagged bassline that warps into acid squiggles.

The "UK garage-indebted" "Who Knew?" mixes Mick Jenkins' "soulful vocals" with an "old-fashioned" vocoder-like effect over "pillow-soft" synths. Disclosure wanted to work with Mick Jenkins because of his rapping on the track "Jazz", but he surprised the brothers with "a beautiful falsetto singing voice." They "rolled with that energy for "Who Knew?" [...] because his voice flowed so well with the music. When a synth would come in over the two-step beat, he would give the sound space to shine through." Alex Petridis of The Guardian called Fatoumata Diawara's feature on "Douha (Mali Mali)" the "album's highlight, a sparkling, effortlessly euphoric take on 90s filter-heavy French house". It is a propulsive Afrobeat track of "deep bass, laser-zap noises, and filter sweeps". The Malian artist sings in Bambara with "raw vocals" for an "ode to her homeland and the African diaspora".

Next is "Fractal", a bubblegum-infused, electro-soul interlude that heads into its bridge with a staggered arpeggio. Jessica Masek of EDM Identity called "Fractal" "ethereal" and "super-chill". Interludes "Fractal" and the later included "Thinking 'Bout You" are considered traditional '90s boom-bap instrumentals. The groovey, electro-funk "C'est ne pas", featuring Cameroonian singer Blick Bassy's "silky" and "majestic" vocals", is minimal with bass, beats, effects, and scat singing. It was originally conceived as an 8-minute studio jam, but Bassy used parts of several local dialects (including French) from his home nation in the vocal take, borrowing elements of each. The pulsating, Latin-inspired title track has "errant" whistles, "clattering" conga drums, cowbells, and synth organs.

The next two songs "hint tantalisingly at a creative expansiveness". The woozy "Thinking 'Bout You" "takes a razor" to a piece of early '70s Canadian blue-eyed soul (Lady's 1976 single “You're Still the One"), with "beautiful" string instruments giving it a "heavenly" touch. "Birthday" is a dreamy, electro-R&B slow jam with "seductive" vocals from Kehlani and The Internet's Syd. "Reverie" is a "palate-cleansing" callback to "'90s Chicago" and features Common, who "spouts his philosophy of positivity" backed by a dreamy, new-age funk jam of bongos and watery droplets of synth. The song has an alternative hip-hop sound.

Disclosure commented that in creating "Birthday", they wrote the song with Syd and were aiming for a "Brandy, Monica, and Aaliyah vibe; that was just how we were all feeling that day". They then thought that it would work as a duet, and Syd remarked that she would contact Kehlani: "So we just went like, yeah, sure, thinking that's not going to happen. And then two weeks later, it was just in the inbox."

=== Lyrics ===
An element of "humanity and humour" was recognised in the songs. John Freeman of Rolling Stone noted that "many of the songs deal with connection and attraction, the powerful pull of bodies toward one another."

On the "strutting" opening track, "Watch Your Step", Kelis "implicates the listener" to "escape isolation and let loose" on the dance floor: "You make me watch your step when you move/Now what you're doing is making me move/With you." On "Lavender", Channel Tres invites listeners to "get closer, baby" before then playfully tossing off, "Tell the boys to bring the clap back in."

"Douha (Mali Mali)" with Fatoumata Diawara, singled out as a highlight by critics, was created in support for Diawara's beloved home country of Mali and the struggles people face there. She sings in Bambara, the traditional Malian language. She says music is in danger in Mali, and music is sacred there for many reasons—one being that it is a way of communicating and connecting with their ancestors. "Douha" in Bambara means "pain", yet the song is upbeat and uplifting—Diawara did this consciously "to find solutions to our problems. [...] We need to dance to our problems, not cry about them."

The title track "Energy" contains lyrics conveying an "uplifting message" of finding inspiration: "Now we goin' to take it to another level/ Right now, you should feel invincible." "Birthday" touches on the question: do you call your ex on their birthday to show them you still care, or is it better to leave them alone? In "Reverie", Common delivers "a wholesome and uplifting" verse about self-improvement: "Slipped into a reverie/I can see a better me/Things that heavenly like love and melody/To the heights of angels that dwell in me."

=== Vocals ===
The vocal performances on the album were considered "breathy", "joyful", "majestic", "quivering", "raw", "seductive", "silky", "soothing", and "soulful".

== Artwork ==
Slant Magazine described Energy's cover art as depicting Disclosure's "signature masked silhouette embedded in a unified landmass that's beginning to break apart." The creative design studio, Studio Moross, produced the artwork for the album and its singles. The 3D images were produced by Nic Hamilton and digitally retouched by Callum Sadler.

== Singles ==
"Know Your Worth" with Khalid was released as the lead single on 4 February 2020, followed by "Ecstasy" on 24 February 2020. Both songs are only included on the deluxe edition only. The third single, "Energy", was released on 21 May 2020, as a two-track single including the album version of the song (4:53) and a shorter edit (3:50). "My High", with Aminé and Slowthai, was released as the fourth single on 3 July 2020. It was issued as a two-track single with a shorter edit (3:12) and the music video. The fifth single, "Douha (Mali Mali)" with Fatoumata Diawara, was released on 29 July 2020, also as a two-track single with a shorter edit (2:51) and the music video. Sixth single "Birthday" (with Kehlani and Syd), was released on 26 August 2020.

== Release ==
Energy was released on 28 August 2020 to digital download and streaming platforms. After multiple delays with the album's release, Disclosure decided to put out Energy during the summer of 2020 because of its "positive messages". Energy completes Disclosure's three-album deal they signed at the onset of their career. The deluxe edition of Energy also features all five songs included on the Ecstasy EP, released on 28 February 2020.

== Minecraft metaverse ==
Disclosure released an accompanying "Minecraft experience" for Energy on 28 August 2020, which they called the "largest immersive musical activation within Minecraft." The metaverse features mountains, rolling streams, deep caves, and forests sprawled across seven climates, intended to reflect the musical diversity of the record. Three are also three underground clubs to unlock: two inspired by iconic real-world venues (London's Printworks and Ibiza's DC10) and a third modelled on Guy's kitchen. Created with Island Records and design collective BlockWorks, the map (made of more than 100 million blocks) contains hidden tracks players can search for (including eight-bit remixes of Disclosure's previous songs) and a Disclosure megamix that scores the experience. The server was announced to be live for one week, after which players can download the Energy-inspired content.

== Critical reception ==
Professional ratings
Aggregate scores
Source	Rating
AnyDecentMusic?	7.1/10
Metacritic	72/100
Review scores
Source	Rating
AllMusic	3/5 stars
Clash	8/10
DIY	4/5 stars
Gigwise	8/10 stars
The Guardian	3/5 stars
The Line of Best Fit	5/10
NME	4/5 stars
The Observer	5/5 stars
Pitchfork	6.5/10
Rolling Stone	3.5/5 stars
Slant Magazine	4/5 stars

Energy received a generally favourable reception. At Metacritic, which assigns a normalised rating out of 100 to reviews from mainstream publications, the album received an average score of 72, based on 15 reviews. Critics complimented Disclosure's genre diversity, collaborations, and the more upbeat songs—others criticised the lyrics and said the album gradually loses steam.

Thomas Smith of NME writes "After a decade in the game, the Lawrence brothers open up on weathering the storm, shrugging off detractors and unveiling their clubtastic new album Energy—a triumphant return to form. Clocking in at 43 minutes, it's their shortest and sharpest album yet. There are no wasted beats or over-wrought jams – just scintillating house anthems with an array of special guest vocalists, including big names such as Kelis, Kehlani and Common, as well as the zeitgeisty likes of punk scallywag Slowthai and Cali producer Channel Tres. It's a record that will eventually soundtrack festival main stages, but the pared-back approach doubles-up as a love letter to the smaller venues on the circuit."

In positive reviews, Jon Freeman of Rolling Stone commented that "Disclosure still have a keen understanding of the dancefloor's ebbs and flows, while Jenessa Williams of DIY called Energy "what they do best, and it's what we want more of – motivational, sky-reaching anthems that don't overthink the euphoria at hand. Charles Lyons-Burt of Slant Magazine wrote, "Energy demands your attention with inviting, joyous beats and its vocalists' direct appeals." In a song-by-song analysis, Clash writer Josh Crowe thought that "'ENERGY' sees the duo step out of their comfort zone, engaging with an array of previously unexplored artists, genres and themes. They have wholeheartedly refined their vision and approach as artists, aligning themselves to the message of their title track says 'where your focus goes, your energy flows.'"

In a mixed review, Alexis Petridis of The Guardian held reservations, saying "With nightclubs closed during coronavirus, the third album from the British pop-house duo has an unwittingly mournful quality. [...] It's obviously not Disclosure's fault that Energy has ended up sounding – at least temporarily – oddly depressing, a succession of paeans to a world of carefree hedonism that's out of reach for the foreseeable future." Peridis later adds: "For now, however, Disclosure seem largely content to stick to their lane. It should keep their career ticking over commercially until normal clubland service is resumed, and their lyrics seem less wistful." Pitchfork writer Chal Ravens liked the upbeat first half of Energy, highlighting "Douha (Mali Mali)", but felt the second half of the album "peters out".

In a mixed-to-negative review, Jack Bray of The Line of Best Fit summarised Energy as "something of a misfire for Disclosure, it is an album that opts to play things safe and the consequence is an unremarkable album that feels at once overthought and simultaneously underdeveloped."

== Commercial performance ==
Energy debuted at number 3 on the US Billboard Dance/Electronic Albums chart, becoming Disclosure's first studio album to miss the top spot.

== Track listing ==
All tracks produced by Disclosure.

Standard edition
No.	Title	Writer(s)	Length
1.	"Watch Your Step" (with Kelis)	Howard Lawrence; Guy Lawrence; Kelis Rogers	3:49
2.	"Lavender" (with Channel Tres)	H. Lawrence; G. Lawrence; Sheldon Young	4:49
3.	"My High" (with Aminé and Slowthai)	H. Lawrence; G. Lawrence; Adam Daniel; Tyron Kaymone Frampton	4:54
4.	"Who Knew?" (with Mick Jenkins)	H. Lawrence; G. Lawrence; Mick Jenkins	3:49
5.	"Douha (Mali Mali)" (with Fatoumata Diawara)	H. Lawrence; G. Lawrence; Fatoumata Diawara	4:54
6.	"Fractal (Interlude)"	H. Lawrence; G. Lawrence	2:06
7.	"Ce n'est pas" (with Blick Bassy)	H. Lawrence; G. Lawrence; Blick Bassy	5:54
8.	"Energy"	H. Lawrence; G. Lawrence; John Fiddy; Frank Ricotti	4:53
9.	"Thinking 'Bout You (Interlude)"	H. Lawrence; G. Lawrence; Richard Wamil	2:00
10.	"Birthday" (with Kehlani and Syd)	H. Lawrence; G. Lawrence; Sydney Bennett; Kehlani Parrish	3:39
11.	"Reverie" (with Common)	H. Lawrence; G. Lawrence; Lonnie Lynn	2:15
Total length:			43:02

Deluxe edition and Japanese edition (bonus tracks)
No.	Title	Writer(s)	Length
12.	"Ecstasy"	H. Lawrence; G. Lawrence; Jacques Burvick; Patrica Shannon; Claude Bartee; Gloria Jones	5:04
13.	"Tondo" (with Eko Roosevelt)	H. Lawrence; G. Lawrence; Eko Roosevelt	5:28
14.	"Expressing What Matters"	H. Lawrence; G. Lawrence; William Royce Scaggs; David Paich	4:24
15.	"Etran" (with Etran Finatawa)	H. Lawrence; G. Lawrence; Ghalitane Khamidoune	5:09
16.	"Get Close"	H. Lawrence; G. Lawrence; Snoop Dogg	3:57
17.	"Know Your Worth" (with Khalid)	G. Lawrence; James Napier; Khalid Robinson	3:01
18.	"Talk" (performed by Khalid)	H. Lawrence; G. Lawrence; Robinson	3:17
19.	"Birthday (Disclosure VIP Remix)" (with Kehlani and Syd)	H. Lawrence; G. Lawrence; Bennett; Parrish	4:46
20.	"Birthday (MJ Cole Remix)" (with Kehlani and Syd)	H. Lawrence; G. Lawrence; Bennett; Parrish	4:20
Total length:			82:28

Notes

- "Energy" is stylized in all caps.

Sample credits

- "Lavender" embodies samples of the "Disco Freq" sample pack by Jason Scott.
- "My High", "Who Knew?" and "Reverie" contain samples from the "90s Garage Tools Vol 1-6" sample pack by Jeremy Sylvester.
- "Energy" embodies samples of Eric Thomas speeches "Think About What You Are Thinking About" and "Amazing"; and contains a sample from "Brasilia", written by Frank Ricotti and John Fiddy.
- "Thinking 'Bout You" contains a sample from "You're Still The One", written by Richard Wamil.
- "Ecstasy" contains samples from "Do You Realize" and "Fantasy", both performed by Aquarian Dream.
- "Tondo" contains a sample of "Tondoho Mba (Guts Edit)", performed by Eko Roosevelt.
- "Expressing What Matters" contains a sample from "Lowdown", performed by Boz Scaggs.
- "Etran" contains a sample from "Heeme", performed by Etran Finatawa.
- "Get Close" embodies a sample of Snoop Dogg from GGN Talk Show.

== Personnel ==
Credits adapted from Tidal.

Musicians

- Mark Summers – drums (1)
- Guy Lawrence – programming (all tracks)
- Howard Lawrence – programming (all tracks), background vocals (2, 6)
- Kelis – vocals (1)
- Channel Tres – vocals (2)
- Slowthai – vocals (3)
- Aminé – vocals (3)
- Mick Jenkins – vocals (4)
- Fatoumata Diawara – vocals (5)
- Blick Bassy – vocals (7)
- Kehlani – vocals (10, 19, 20)
- Syd – vocals (10, 19, 20)
- Common – vocals (11)
- Eko Roosevelt – vocals, instrumental ensemble (13)
- Etran Finatawa – vocals, instrumental ensemble (15)
- Khalid – vocals (17, 18)
- MJ Cole – remixer (20)

Technical

- Stuart Hawkes – mastering engineer (1–16, 19, 20)
- Dale Becker – mastering engineer (17, 18)
- Guy Lawrence – mixer (all tracks), music production (17, 18)
- Denis Kosiak – mixer (17, 18), recording engineer (17, 18), vocal producer (17, 18)
- Jon Castelli – mixer (17, 18)
- Ingmar Carlson – mix engineer (17, 18)
- Josh Deguzman – mix engineer (17, 18)
- Mark Summers – recording engineer (1)
- Ira Grylack – recording engineer (1, 3, 4, 10, 11, 19, 20)
- Chad Gordon – recording engineer (2)
- Jimmy Napes – music production (17, 18)
- Hector Vega – assistant mastering engineer (17, 18)

== Charts ==
=== Weekly charts ===
Weekly chart performance for Energy
Chart (2020)	Peak position
Australian Albums (ARIA)	12
Belgian Albums (Ultratop Flanders)	75
Belgian Albums (Ultratop Wallonia)	92
Canadian Albums (Billboard)	37
Dutch Albums (Album Top 100)	25
French Albums (SNEP)	132
German Albums (Offizielle Top 100)	71
Irish Albums (Official Charts)	11
Japanese Albums (Oricon)	89
New Zealand Albums (RMNZ)	39
Scottish Albums (Official Charts)	8
Swiss Albums (Schweizer Hitparade)	38
UK Albums (Official Charts)	4
US Billboard 200	48
US Top Dance Albums (Billboard)	3

=== Year-end charts ===
Year-end chart performance for Energy
Chart (2020)	Position
US Top Dance/Electronic Albums (Billboard)	25
Chart (2021)	Position
US Top Dance/Electronic Albums (Billboard)	8
Chart (2022)	Position
US Top Dance/Electronic Albums (Billboard)	20

== Certifications ==
Certifications for Energy
Region	Certification	Certified units/sales
United Kingdom (BPI)	Silver	60,000^{‡}
^{‡} Sales+streaming figures based on certification alone.
