= Feel Away =

Single by Slowthai featuring James Blake and Mount Kimbie

from the album Tyron
- Released: 15 September 2020
- Genre: Hip-hop
- Length: 3:24
- Label: Method Records; Interscope; AWGE
- Songwriter(s): Tyron Frampton; Dominic Maker; James Blake; Dave Hall; Mariah Carey
- Producer(s): Dominic Maker

Slowthai singles chronology
"My High" (2020)	"Feel Away" (2020)	"NHS" (2020)

James Blake singles chronology
"Godspeed" (2020)	"Feel Away" (2020)	"Before" (2020)

Mount Kimbie singles chronology
"You Look Certain (I'm Not So Sure)" (2019)	"Feel Away" (2020)	"Black Stone / Blue Liquid" (2021)

Music video
- "Feel Away" on YouTube

"Feel Away" (stylized in all lowercase) is a song by British rapper Slowthai featuring English singer James Blake and English electronic music group Mount Kimbie. It was released as the lead single from Slowthai's second studio album Tyron on 15 September 2020. The outro of the song interpolates "Dreamlover" by Mariah Carey.

== Background ==
"Feel Away" was written in early 2020 in Los Angeles by Slowthai, Dominic Maker, James Blake and Dave Hall.

On 13 September 2020, Mount Kimbie shared a photo from the studio with Slowthai and James Blake, hinting an upcoming collaboration. On 14 September, Slowthai announced the single. In an Instagram post he dedicated the song to his younger brother, who died following complications from muscular dystrophy shortly after his first birthday, and when Slowthai was eight.

== Composition ==
Talking about the song, Slowthai said: "This song is about the doubts we have whether it be within friendships, your partner or with our family. It’s about putting yourself in the other person’s shoes so you have a better understanding of the situation".

The outro of the song interpolates "Dreamlover" by Mariah Carey. Asked about the idea for that interpolation, Slowthai said that James Blake was inspired by the reference of Carey in his opening verse, "You felt low, I took you higher than a note from Mariah".

== Music video ==
The music video for the song, directed by Oscar Hudson, was released onto YouTube on 15 September 2020.

The video is recorded in POV style. In the video, pregnant Slowthai arrives on a maternity ward. He undergoes an ultrasound scan, during which the fetus is shown lip-syncing the lyrics. His fiancée falls in love with a doctor, and the two are getting married while Slowthai gives birth. The baby is ultimately revealed to be made of cake, as is Slowthai himself, culminating in a scene where the newlyweds cut his arm with a knife, and eat his cake-like limbs.

All body parts, except Slowthai's head and torso, were made from vanilla cake and chocolate ganache by Ben Cullen, also known as The BakeKing.

== Critical reception ==
Sam Moore of NME gave the song 4 out of 5 stars. He called James Blake the "star of the show", praising his vocals, and called the song "poignant because the rapper [Slowthai] dials down his previous desire to be the loudest person in the room".

== Charts ==
Weekly chart performance for "Feel Away"
Chart (2020)	Peak position
New Zealand Hot Singles (RMNZ)	34
UK Singles (OCC)	92
