= Ecstasy (Disclosure song) =

Single by Disclosure

from the EP Ecstasy and the album Energy (deluxe edition)
- Released: 24 February 2020
- Label: Island
- Songwriters: Claude Bartlee; Gloria Jones; Guy Lawrence; Howard Lawrence; Jacques Burvick; Patrica Shannon
- Producer: Disclosure

Disclosure singles chronology
"Know Your Worth" (2020)	"Ecstasy" (2020)	"Energy" (2020)

"Ecstasy" is a song by British electronic music duo Disclosure. It was released as the lead single from the duo's eighth EP of the same name, and second single from their third studio album Energy on 24 February 2020.

== Background ==
In a statement, Guy and Howard Lawrence said, "This song came into existence early 2019 during a writing session at Guy's house in London. We were curiously chopping up samples from various Seventies disco and soul records when suddenly, Fantasy by Aquarian Dream gave us the exact thing we were searching for. This song is made entirely to get a human being to their feet and directly to the dance floor."

== Personnel ==
Credits adapted from Tidal.

- Guy Lawrence – producer, composer, lyricist, associated performer, mixer, programming, studio personnel
- Howard Lawrence – producer, composer, lyricist, associated performer, programming
- Claude Bartlee – composer, lyricist
- Gloria Jones – composer, lyricist
- Jacques Burvick – composer, lyricist
- Patrica Shannon – composer, lyricist
- Stuart Hawkes – mastering engineer, studio personnel

== Track listing ==
Tracks and metadata adapted from iTunes. All tracks produced by Disclosure.

Ecstasy – EP
No.	Title	Writer(s)	Length
1.	"Ecstasy"	Howard Lawrence; Guy Lawrence; Jacques Burvick; Patrica Shannon; Claude Bartee; Gloria Jones	5:04
2.	"Tondo" (with Eko Roosevelt)	H. Lawrence; G. Lawrence; Eko Roosevelt	5:28
3.	"Expressing What Matters"	H. Lawrence; G. Lawrence; William R. Scaggs; David Paich	4:24
4.	"Etran" (with Etran Finatawa)	H. Lawrence; G. Lawrence; Etran Finatawa	5:09
5.	"Get Close"	H. Lawrence; G. Lawrence; Calvin Broadus, Jr.	3:57
Total length:			TBA

== Charts ==
Chart (2020)	Peak position
US Hot Dance/Electronic Songs (Billboard)	34

== Release history ==
Region	Date	Format	Label
Various	24 February 2020	Digital download; streaming	Island
