= Birthday (Disclosure, Kehlani and Syd song) =

Single by Disclosure, Kehlani and Syd

from the album Energy
- Released: 26 August 2020
- Length: 3:39
- Label: Island; Universal
- Songwriters: Guy Lawrence; Howard Lawrence; Kehlani Parrish; Sydney Bennett
- Producer: Disclosure

Disclosure singles chronology
"Douha (Mali Mali)" (2020)	"Birthday" (2020)	"Watch Your Step" (2020)

Kehlani singles chronology
"Can I" (2020)	"Birthday" (2020)	"Take You Back" (2020)

Syd singles chronology
"Body" (2017)	"Birthday" (2020)	"Missing Out" (2021)

"Birthday" is a song by the English band Disclosure and American singer-songwriters Kehlani and Syd. It was released as the sixth single from the duo's third studio album Energy on 26 August 2020. The song was written by Guy Lawrence, Howard Lawrence, Kehlani Parrish and Sydney Bennett.

== Background ==
"It has definitely stood the test of time and deservedly made the cut. And the addition of Kehlani just took it to the next level and turned into a fire duet. Syd and I were going through a similar thing at the time, trying to work out if it was cool to call your ex to say hi or is it too awkward / mean to do so out of the blue?"

— Guy and Howard Lawrence, "Disclosure team up with Kehlani and The Internet's Syd for new song 'Birthday'", NME

== Music video ==
A music video to accompany the release of "Birthday" was first released onto YouTube on 28 August 2020.

== Track listing ==
Digital download and streaming
No.	Title	Length
1.	"Birthday"	3:39
2.	"Birthday" (Disclosure VIP Remix)	4:46

== Credits and personnel ==
Credits adapted from Tidal.

- Guy Lawrence – Producer, composer, lyricist, associated performer, mixer, programming, studio personnel
- Howard Lawrence – Producer, composer, lyricist, associated performer, programming
- Kehlani Parrish – Composer, lyricist, associated performer, vocals
- Sydney Bennett – Composer, lyricist, associated performer, vocals
- Stuart Hawkes – Mastering Engineer, studio personnel
- Ira Grylack – Recording Engineer, studio personnel

== Charts ==
=== Weekly charts ===
Chart (2020)	Peak position
UK Singles (OCC)	81
US Hot Dance/Electronic Songs (Billboard)	12

=== Year-end charts ===
Chart (2020)	Position
US Hot Dance/Electronic Songs (Billboard)	99

== Release history ==
Region	Date	Format	Label
Various	26 August 2020	Digital download; streaming	Island; Universal
