= Slowthai =

British rapper (born 1994)

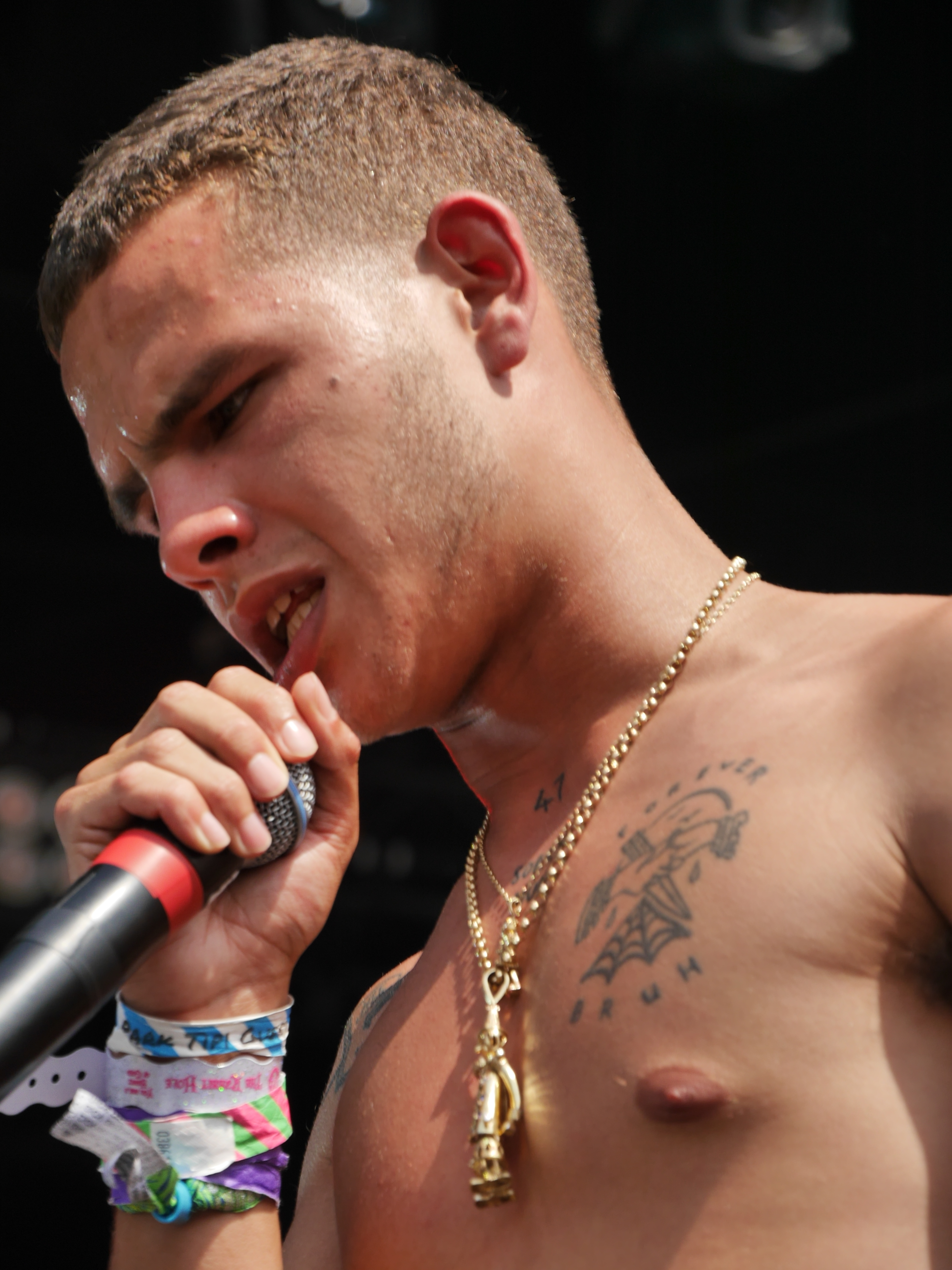
- Slowthai at Glastonbury Festival in 2019

Background information
- Born: Tyron Kaymone Frampton; 18 December 1994 (age 31); Northampton, England
- Genres: Hip hop; grime; punk rap
- Occupation: Rapper
- Years active: 2015–present
- Labels: Method; AWGE; Interscope; True Panther Sounds
- Spouse: Anne-Marie (m. 2022)
- Children: 3

- Website: slowthai.com

Tyron Kaymone Frampton (born 18 December 1994), better known by his stage name Slowthai (stylised in lowercase), is a British rapper. Raised in Northampton, he rose to popularity in 2019 for his gritty and rough instrumentals and raw, politically charged lyrics.

Slowthai placed fourth in the BBC Sound of 2019 and followed up in the same year with his debut studio album, Nothing Great About Britain. The album was nominated for the Mercury Prize; at Slowthai's 2019 Mercury Prize ceremony performance, he held a fake severed head of British prime minister Boris Johnson on stage, prompting controversy. Ensuing years saw the releases of his second and third studio albums, Tyron (2021) and Ugly (2023).

== Early life ==
Tyron Kaymone Frampton was born on 18 December 1994 in Northampton to Gaynor, a teenage mother who is half-Barbadian. Frampton, his sister, and his brother were raised by their single mother in a council estate in the Lings area of Northampton. His younger brother Michael died shortly after his first birthday, which greatly affected Frampton. Frampton attended Northampton Academy and in 2011 attended Northampton College, where he studied for a BTEC in Music Technology. Frampton has ADHD and frequently skipped school during his years at Northampton Academy, often spending time at a nearby underground "recording studio" at his friend's house, only stopping when his mother was forced to attend a compulsory court hearing. After college, Frampton had multiple short stints in employment, working as a labourer, a plasterer, and at a branch of Next before being fired for breach of contract after he gave his friend employee discounts.

== Career ==
=== 2016–2019: Beginnings and Nothing Great About Britain ===
The name Slowthai originates from his childhood nickname given to him due to his slow speech and drawled tone: "slow ty". In 2016, he released his break-out single, "Jiggle", produced by Sammy Byrne.

In 2017, Slowthai partnered up with indie record label Bone Soda to release his I Wish I Knew EP, "Murder" and "T n Biscuits". Later in the same year, Slowthai signed his recording contract with Method Records and since has released his Runt EP and debut studio album, Nothing Great About Britain, which peaked at number 9 on the Official Charts on the week of release.

In addition to being included in the BBC's Sound of 2019 poll and NME's NME 100 list, Slowthai as well received acclaim from publications such as DIY, Vevo and Metro. Alongside that, his debut album was shortlisted for a Mercury Music Prize, losing to Dave's Psychodrama.

Slowthai contributed additional, uncredited vocals on the song "What's Good" from Tyler, the Creator's album Igor. He is also featured on "Heaven Belongs to You" from Brockhampton's album Ginger and later joined their HBTY North American tour in 2019 as the special guest.

=== 2020–2021: Tyron ===
In January 2020, Slowthai was featured alongside UK punk band Soft Play (formerly known as Slaves) on Gorillaz's single "Momentary Bliss". The single was the first "episode" of their Song Machine project.

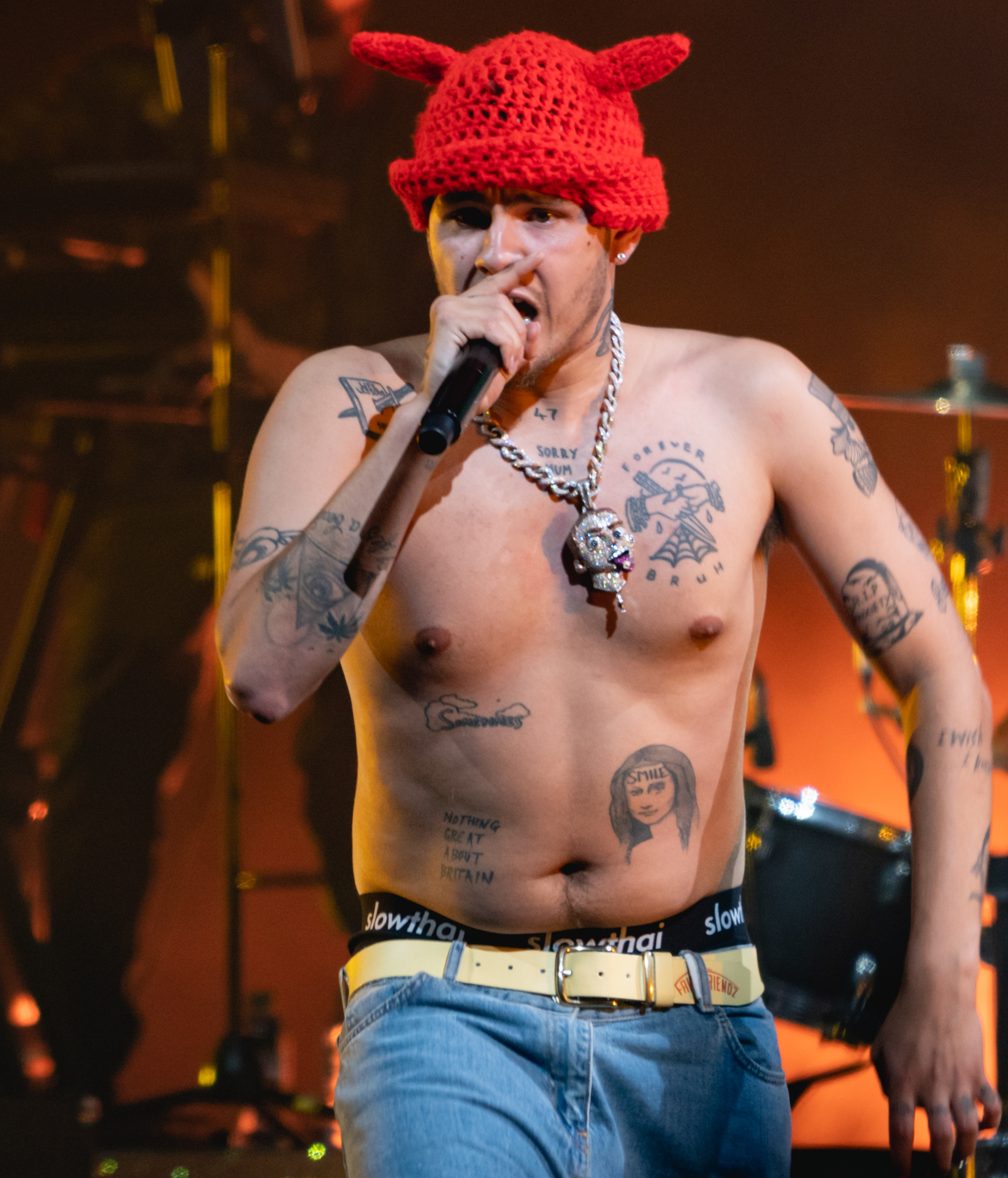
Slowthai performing in 2021

On 12 February 2020, after winning the Hero of the Year award at the NME Awards, Slowthai made sexual comments about host Katherine Ryan. After audience members began shouting at him, Slowthai dropped his microphone into the crowd, which was then thrown back at him along with a drink. Slowthai then threw his own drink and jumped into the crowd. Slowthai has since apologised, while Ryan has said the situation was taken the wrong way.

On 10 May 2020, Slowthai released the single "Enemy". On 13 May 2020, Slowthai released the single "Magic" with producer Kenny Beats. The following day, on 14 May 2020, Slowthai released the single "BB (Bodybag)".

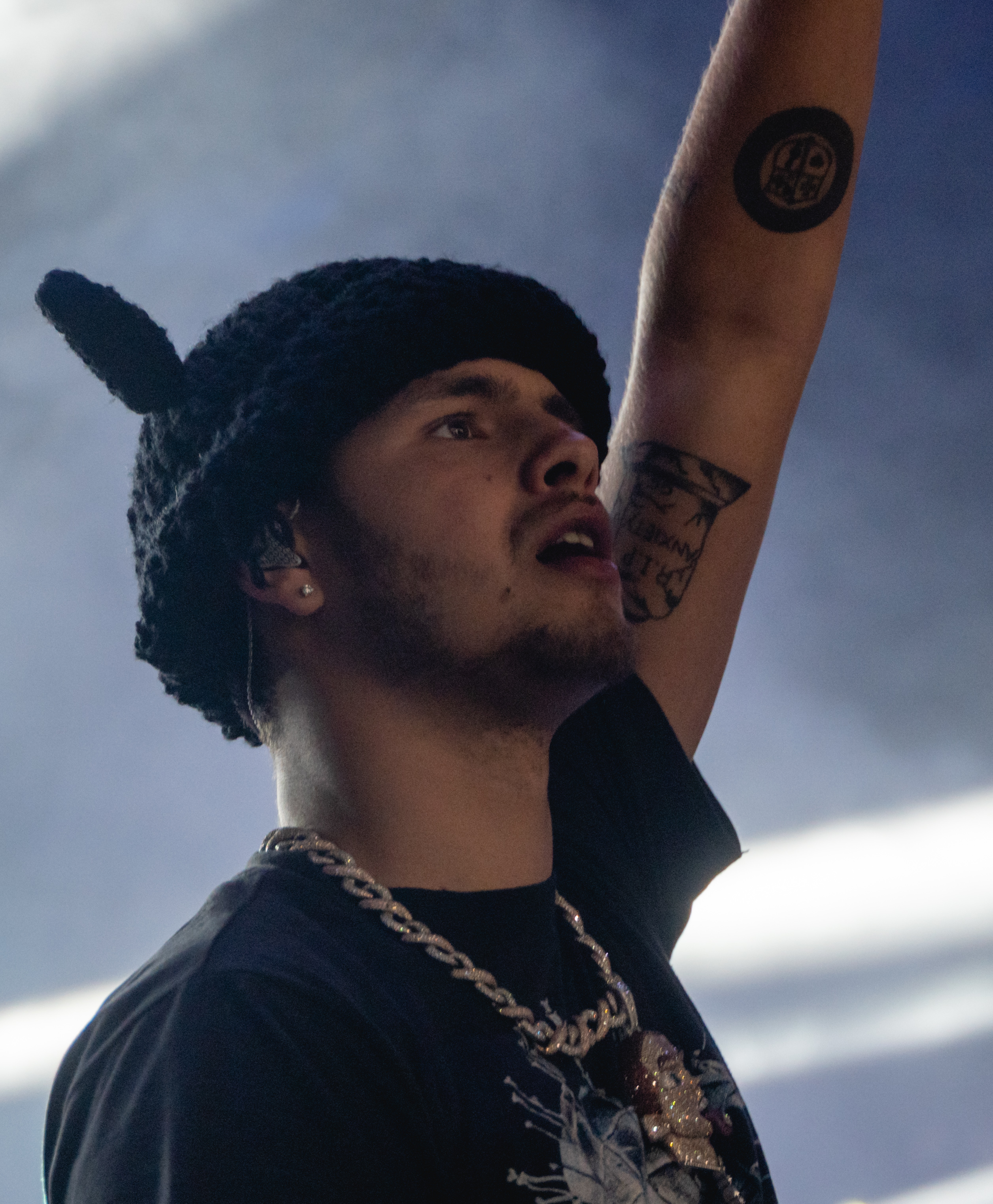
Slowthai performing at Boardmasters Festival in 2021

On 15 September 2020, Slowthai released the single "Feel Away" featuring James Blake and Mount Kimbie. The song was said to be a tribute to his brother, for the anniversary of his death. On 19 November, Slowthai released the single "nhs" alongside a tracklist for his album Tyron, releasing 5 February 2021, which was then delayed a week, and planned to release 12 February 2021. On 18 December 2020, Slowthai released "Thoughts" as a non-album single, along with a lyric video that featured local police responding to a complaint of a social gathering. On 5 January 2021, Slowthai released "Mazza", a single featuring A$AP Rocky. On 9 February 2021, Slowthai released "Cancelled", a single featuring Skepta. On 12 February 2021, Slowthai released the album Tyron, which has features including Skepta, Dominic Fike, James Blake, A$AP Rocky and Denzel Curry.

=== 2022–present: Ugly ===
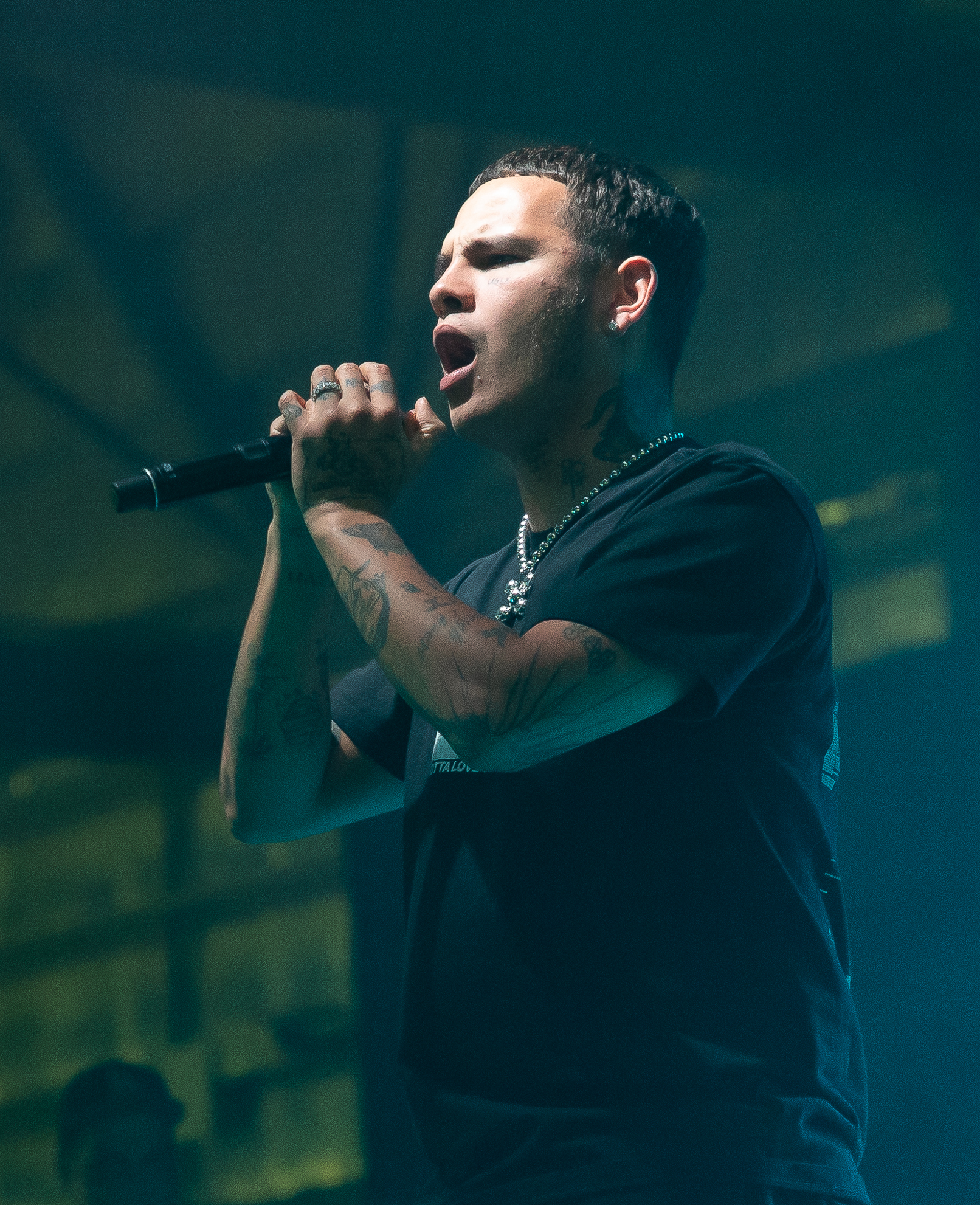
Slowthai performing at Laneway Festival in 2023

On 9 November 2022, Slowthai released "I Know Nothing". On 25 January 2023, Slowthai released the single "Selfish" and announced his new album, UGLY, which was released on 3 March 2023. UGLY is an acronym which stands for "U Gotta Love Yourself".

== Personal life ==
Slowthai is a supporter of his hometown football team Northampton Town, with parts of the music video for "Gorgeous" having been filmed at Northampton Town's Sixfields Stadium. He has also stated that he supports Liverpool F.C.

In 2020, Slowthai became engaged to Russian singer and model Katya Kischuk, former member of the Russian girl group Serebro. On 18 June 2021, Kischuk gave birth to their son. Slowthai and Kischuk broke up in 2022.

In a February 2023 Rolling Stone interview, Slowthai confirmed his relationship with British singer Anne-Marie, whom he began dating in early 2022. In 2024, it was revealed that the couple had secretly married in July 2022 in Las Vegas. In February 2024, Anne-Marie gave birth to their daughter. In April 2025, she gave birth to their son.

== Legal issues ==
On 15 May 2023, Slowthai was charged with two counts of rape relating to an incident alleged to have happened in September 2021. Following the charges, he denied the allegations in a statement, which read: "Regarding the allegations being reported about me. I categorically deny the charges. I am innocent and I am confident my name will be cleared." On 15 June, Slowthai appeared at Oxford Crown Court alongside co-defendant Alex Blake-Walker. He pleaded not guilty to both charges. The trial was set to begin on 1 July 2024. However, the proceedings were delayed and a new date was set for 25 November 2024.

=== Trial ===
The trial began on 25 November 2024 at Oxford Crown Court. The jury of twelve jurors, eight men and four women, was sworn in on the same day.

On 26 November, the opening remarks were given by the prosecution and the defence. Heather Stangoe, prosecuting, told the court that the defendants allegedly raped two women on a rooftop, "high-fived, discussed 'tag teams' and contemplated swapping the girls." Ms Stangoe alleged that Blake-Walker raped one of the women while being encouraged by Frampton, and that Frampton raped the other one while being encouraged by his co-defendant. Their actions led to them being jointly charged with oral and vaginal rape. Blake-Walker was additionally charged with sexual assault. Patrick Gibbs KC, defending Frampton, told the jury that the sexual activity between Frampton and one of the women was consensual, and that the case was about "willingly participating in something that is spontaneous and chaotic and in the excitement of the intoxication of the moment and on the other hand regretting it afterwards". He also mentioned the effect of celebrity.

On 11 December, both the prosecution and the defence delivered their closing remarks. During his statement, Gibbs highlighted "a dozen problems" with the prosecution's case, while Sheryl Nwosu, defending Blake-Walker, questioned the reliability of the testimony provided by one of the complainants. On 12 December, following a two-week trial, the jury retired to consider their verdicts.

On 16 December, Slowthai and Blake-Walker were found not guilty of three joint counts of rape, while Blake-Walker was also found not guilty of one count of sexual assault.

== Musical style ==
His music has been categorised as grime and hip hop. He often includes elements of punk rock, leading to the categorisation of grime-punk. In a 2019 article for the BBC, Kev Geoghegan described him as "either a grime MC making punk music or a punk making rap music". In an article for Vice Media, Niloufar Haidari described his music as "caustically witty bars over abrasive beats that blend grime, trap, Soundcloud rap and even punk and screamo".

He has cited as musical influences Gesaffelstein, Juelz Santana, Elliott Smith, Radiohead, Nirvana, Mount Kimbie, Alex Turner of Arctic Monkeys, Jay-Z, Sex Pistols, Justice, Oasis, Kanye West and Die Antwoord.

== Discography ==
=== Studio albums ===
Title	Details	Peak chart positions								Certifications	Sales
Title	Details	UK	AUS	BEL (FL)	GER	IRE	NLD	NZ	SWI	Certifications	Sales
Nothing Great About Britain	Release: 17 May 2019; Label: Method; Format: CD, LP, streaming, digital download	9	—	—	—	64	—	—	—	UK: 60,000	BPI: Silver
Tyron	Released: 12 February 2021; Label: Method, Interscope, AWGE; Format: CD, LP, streaming, digital download	1	11	24	23	2	53	13	24	UK: 16,940	BPI: Silver
Ugly	Released: 3 March 2023; Label: Method, Interscope; Format: CD, LP, streaming, digital download	2	85	26	—	3	85	30	91	UK: 17,220	
"—" denotes a recording that did not chart or was not released in that territory.

=== Extended plays ===
Title	Details
slowitdownn ノノ	Release: 7 March 2017; Label: Bone Soda; Format: Digital download
I Wish I Knew ノノ	Release: 3 November 2017; Label: Bone Soda; Format: Digital download
Runt	Release: 14 September 2018; Label: Method; Format: Digital download

=== Singles ===
Title	Year	Peak chart positions			Certifications	Album
Title	Year	UK	IRE	NZ Hot	Certifications	Album
"Jiggle"	2016	—	—	—		Non-album singles
"Murder"	2017	—	—	—		Non-album singles
"T n Biscuits"^{[a]}	2018	—	—	—	BPI: Silver	Nothing Great About Britain
"The Bottom"^{[b]}	2018	—	—	—		Non-album single
"North Nights"^{[a]}^{[b]}	2018	—	—	—		Nothing Great About Britain
"Ladies"^{[a]}	2018	—	—	—		Nothing Great About Britain
"Polaroid"^{[a]}	2018	—	—	—		Nothing Great About Britain
"Drug Dealer"^{[a]}	2018	—	—	—		Nothing Great About Britain
"Rainbow"^{[a]}	2018	—	—	—		Nothing Great About Britain
"Doorman" (with Mura Masa)	2018	—	—	—	BPI: Silver	Nothing Great About Britain
"Peace of Mind"	2019	—	—	—		Nothing Great About Britain
"Gorgeous"	2019	—	—	—		Nothing Great About Britain
"Nothing Great About Britain"	2019	—	—	—		Nothing Great About Britain
"Inglorious" (featuring Skepta)	2019	50	—	—		Nothing Great About Britain
"Toaster"	2019	—	—	—		Nothing Great About Britain
"Psycho" (with Denzel Curry)	2019	—	—	—		Non-album single
"Deal wiv It" (with Mura Masa)	2019	—	—	—		R.Y.C
"Enemy"	2020	—	—	—		Non-album singles
"Magic" (with Kenny Beats)	2020	—	—	—		Non-album singles
"BB (Bodybag)"	2020	—	—	—		Non-album singles
"My High" (with Disclosure and Aminé)	2020	86	—	—		Energy
"Feel Away" (featuring James Blake and Mount Kimbie)	2020	92	—	34		Tyron
"NHS"	2020	—	—	—		Tyron
"Thoughts"	2020	—	—	—		Non-album single
"Mazza" (with A$AP Rocky)	2021	72	89	20		Tyron
"Cancelled" (with Skepta)	2021	39	54	10		Tyron
"Vex"	2021	—	—	—		Tyron
"ADHD"	2021	—	—	—		Tyron
"I Know Nothing"	2022	—	—	—		Non-album single
"Selfish"	2023	—	—	—		Ugly
"Feel Good"	2023	—	—	—		Ugly
"—" denotes a recording that did not chart or was not released in that territory.

Notes

- ^{a} Appears on the deluxe edition of Nothing Great About Britain only.
- ^{b} "The Bottom" and "North Nights" were released as a double A-side.

==== As featured artist ====
Title	Year	Peak chart positions		Album
Title	Year	UK	IRE	Album
"Interior" (JD.Reid featuring 808INK, Slowthai, Oscar #Worldpeace)	2017	—	—	Calibrate EP
"Noddy" (Earbuds featuring Slowthai)	2018	—	—	Non-album singles
"Lighthouse" (Take a Daytrip featuring Rico Nasty, Slowthai and IceColdBishop)	2019	—	—	Non-album singles
"Momentary Bliss" (Gorillaz featuring Slowthai and Slaves)	2020	58	74	Song Machine, Season One: Strange Timez
"Glidin'" (Pa Salieu featuring Slowthai)	2021	—	—	Non-album singles
"BDE" (Shygirl featuring Slowthai)	2021	—	—	Non-album singles
"Slugger" (Kevin Abstract featuring $not and Slowthai)	2021	—	—	Non-album singles
"Model Village" (Idles featuring Slowthai)	2021	—	—	Ultra Mono
"Zatoichi'" (Denzel Curry featuring Slowthai)	2022	—	—	Melt My Eyez See Your Future
"In Your Eyes'" (Dom Maker featuring Danny Brown and Slowthai)	2022	—	—	MK 3.5: Die Cuts / City Planning
"—" denotes a recording that did not chart or was not released in that territory.

=== Other charted songs ===
Title	Year	Peak chart positions				Album
Title	Year	UK	FRA	IRE	NZ Hot	Album
"High Beams" (with Flume and HWLS)	2019	—	—	—	7	Hi This Is Flume
"45 Smoke"	2021	—	—	—	25	Tyron
"Terms" (with Dominic Fike and Denzel Curry)	2021	71	—	88	11	Tyron
"Push" (with Deb Never)	2021	—	—	—	24	Tyron
"Fallen Angels" (Laylow featuring Slowthai)	2021	—	55	—	—	L'étrange histoire de Mr. Anderson
"Sooner"	2023	—	—	—	32	Ugly
"—" denotes a recording that did not chart or was not released in that territory.

=== Guest appearances ===
Title	Year	Other artist(s)	Album	Credit(s)
"Like a See Saw"	2015	Lord Pusswhip	Lord Pusswhip Is Wack	Featured artist; co-writer
"Piggy Bank"	2018	JD.Reid	Tree	Featured artist
"High Beams"	2019	Flume, HWLS	Hi This Is Flume	Featured artist; co-writer
"What's Good"	2019	Tyler, the Creator	Igor	Background vocals
"Meanwhile... at the Welcome Break"	2019	The S.L.P.	The S.L.P.	Featured artist
"Heaven Belongs to You"	2019	Brockhampton	Ginger	Vocals; co-writer
"Tyron (Interlude)"	2020	Headie One, Fred Again	GANG	Featured artist; co-writer
"Barry White"	2020	Zero	Non-album single	Vocals
"Pressure in My Palms"	2020	Aminé, Vince Staples	Limbo	Featured artist
"Graveyard Shift"	2020	AJ Tracey	Secure the Bag! 2	Featured artist
"Fallen Angels"	2021	Laylow	L'étrange Histoire de Mr.Anderson	Featured artist; co-writer
"Funeral"	2021	James Blake	Friends That Break Your Heart	Featured artist; co-writer
"Family Tree"	2022	Kenny Beats	Louie	Vocals; co-writer
"Up All Week"	2022	Mura Masa	Demon Time	Featured artist
"Kissing"	2022	Mount Kimbie, Dom Maker	MK 3.5: Die Cuts / City Planning	Featured artist; co-writer
"Grudge"	2023	Anne-Marie	Unhealthy	Background vocals; co-writer
"Irish Goodbye"	2023	Anne-Marie	Unhealthy	Co-writer
"Christmas Without You"	2023	Anne-Marie	Your Christmas or Mine 2 (Original Motion Picture Soundtrack)	Co-writer

== Tours ==
=== Headlining ===
- Slowthai's Circus Tour (2018)
- Brexit Bandit Tour (2019)
- 99p Tour (2019)
- Bet Ya a £5er Tour (2019)
- Coming To America Tour (2019)
- Something To Look Forward To Tour (2021)
- Hell Is Home Tour (2022)
- Antisocial Roadshow (2022)
- Ugly Tour (2023; cancelled)

=== Supporting ===
- Dave - Psychodrama Tour (2019)
- Brockhampton - Heaven Belongs To You Tour (2019)
- Suicideboys - Grey Day Tour (2021)

== Awards and nominations ==
Year	Organization/Award	Category	Work	Result	Ref.
2018	Ticketmaster	New for 2019	Himself	Included	
2018	Vevo	DSCVR 2019 Artists to Watch	Himself	Included	
2018	BBC	Sound of 2019	Himself	Fourth	
2018	DIY	Class of 2019	Himself	Included	
2018	Metro	Ones to Watch 2019	Himself	Included	
2019	UK Music Video Awards	Best Urban Video - UK	"Inglorious" (featuring Skepta)	Nominated	
2019	Q Awards	Breakthrough Act	Himself	Nominated	
2019	Q Awards	Best Album	Nothing Great About Britain	Nominated	
2019	Hyundai	Mercury Prize	Nothing Great About Britain	Nominated	
2020	Hungarian Music Awards	Best Foreign Hip-Hop or Rap Album	Nothing Great About Britain	Nominated	
2020	NME Awards	Best Album	Nothing Great About Britain	Nominated	
2020	NME Awards	Best Album in the World	Nothing Great About Britain	Nominated	
2020	NME Awards	Best British Song	"Deal wiv It" (with Mura Masa)	Nominated	
2020	NME Awards	Best Song in the World	"Deal wiv It" (with Mura Masa)	Nominated	
2020	NME Awards	Best British Solo Act	Himself	Nominated	
2020	NME Awards	Best Solo Act in the World	Himself	Nominated	
2020	NME Awards	Best Live Act	Himself	Nominated	
2020	NME Awards	Best Collaboration	Himself (with Mura Masa)	Won	
2020	UK Music Video Awards	Best Hip Hop/Grime/Rap Video - UK	"Psycho" (with Denzel Curry)	Nominated	
2020	UK Music Video Awards	Best Dance/Electronic Video - UK	"Deal wiv It" (with Mura Masa)	Nominated	
2020	UK Music Video Awards	Best Dance/Electronic Video - UK	"My High" (with Disclosure and Aminé)	Won	
2020	UK Music Video Awards	Best Editing in a Video	"My High" (with Disclosure and Aminé)	Nominated	
2021	Grammy Awards	Best Dance Recording	"My High" (with Disclosure and Aminé)	Nominated	
2021	UK Music Video Awards	Best Hip Hop/Grime/Rap Video - UK	"Feel Away" (with James Blake and Mount Kimbie)	Nominated	
2021	Berlin Music Video Awards	Best Concept	"Feel Away" (with James Blake and Mount Kimbie)	3rd place	
2021	Berlin Music Video Awards	Best Editor	"My High" (with Disclosure and Aminé)	Nominated	
2021	Berlin Music Video Awards	Most Bizarre	"Cancelled" (featuring Skepta)	Nominated	
2023	Berlin Music Video Awards	Most Bizarre	"Yum"	Won	
2023	Berlin Music Video Awards	Best Music Video	"Yum"	2nd place	
