= Energy (Disclosure song) =

Single by Disclosure

from the album Energy
- Released: 21 May 2020
- Length: 4:53
- Label: Island
- Songwriter(s): Howard Lawrence; Guy Lawrence; John Fiddy; Frank Ricotti
- Producer(s): Disclosure

Disclosure singles chronology
"Ecstasy" (2020)	"Energy" (2020)	"My High" (2020)

"Energy" is a song by British electronic music duo Disclosure. It was released as the third single from the duo's third studio album Energy on 21 May 2020. The song was written by Howard Lawrence, Guy Lawrence, John Fiddy and Frank Ricotti.

== Background ==
The song uses vocal samples by Eric Thomas, whose vocals were also sampled on the songs "Intro" and "When a Fire Starts to Burn", which feature on the duo's debut studio album Settle. In a statement, Guy and Howard Lawrence said, "When we found Eric many years ago, he was like a goldmine of inspirational quotes and motivational speeches. Even if he was speaking to a room of five it was like he was addressing a stadium. He has an immense presence and energy about him that translates so well into music – especially house music. This time we cut up various speeches to make something that makes sense. What he says is basically the whole concept for the record, that's why it became the title track."

== Music video ==
A music video to accompany the release of "Energy" was first released onto YouTube on 21 May 2020. The video was directed by Glenn Michael & Christo.

== Track listing ==
Digital download
No.	Title	Length
1.	"Energy"	4:53
2.	"Energy" (edit)	3:50

== Charts ==
Chart (2020)	Peak position
Belgium (Ultratip Bubbling Under Flanders)	23

== Release history ==
Region	Date	Format	Label
Various	21 May 2020	Digital download; streaming	Island
