= Eric Thomas (motivational speaker) =

American motivational speaker, author, consultant, and minister

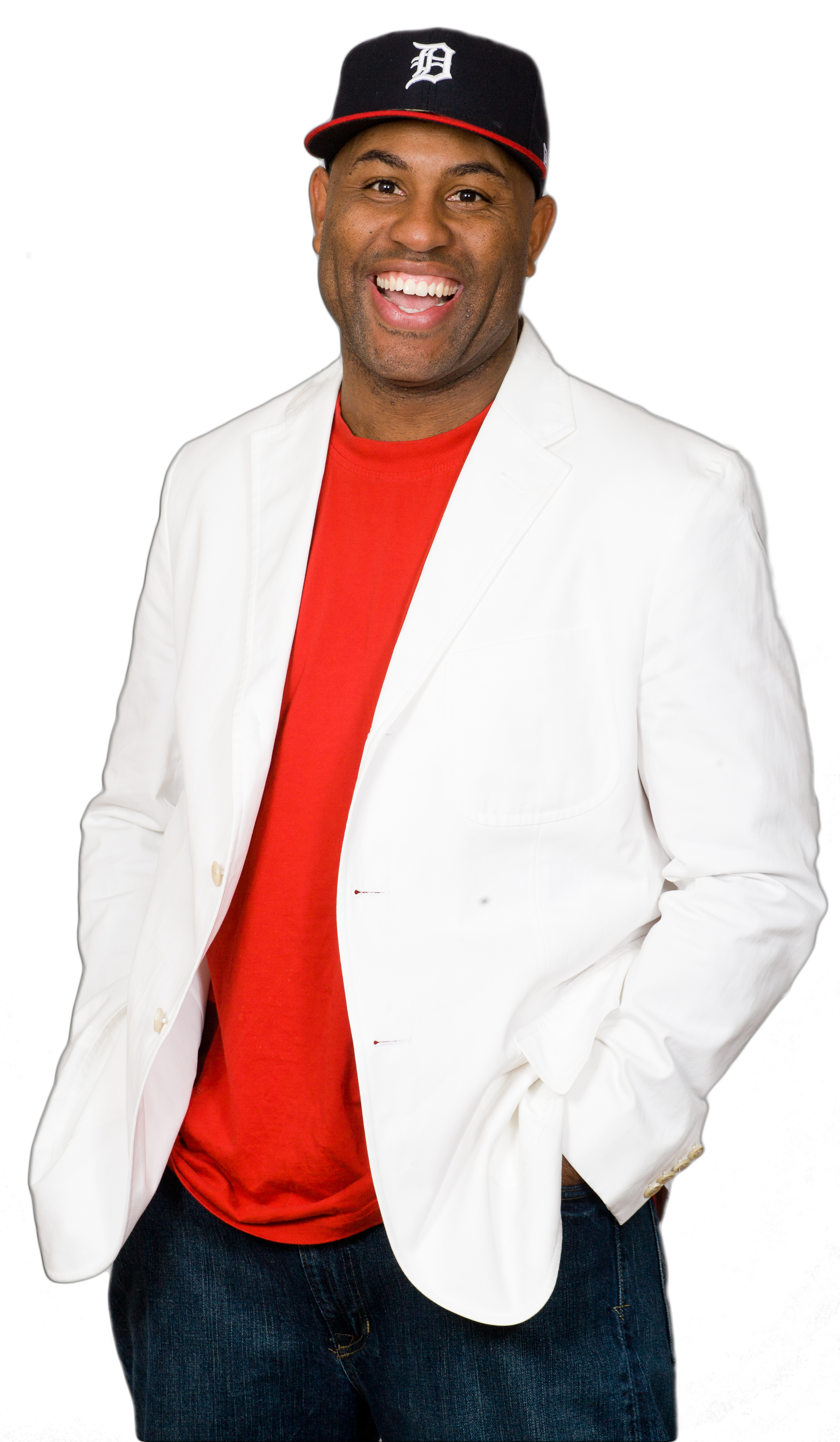
- Thomas in 2011
- Born: Eric D. Thomas; September 3, 1970 (age 55); Chicago, Illinois
- Education: Oakwood University (B.A.); Michigan State University (M.A.); Michigan State University (Ph.D.)
- Occupations: Motivational speaker; consultant; coach; author; minister
- Website: Eric Thomas Website

Eric D. Thomas (born September 3, 1970) is an American motivational speaker, author, consultant, and minister. Speeches by Thomas are popular on YouTube.

== Early life ==
Thomas was born in Chicago, Illinois and raised in Detroit, Michigan. He was born to a single, teenage mother. After various arguments with his parents and aunts, he dropped out of high school and lived homeless on the streets of Detroit for two years.

While he was homeless, a friend took him to his church, where he met a pastor and evangelist team who encouraged him to get his G.E.D. and pursue a college degree. He was invited to move in with one of the church members' families and secured employment at the local McDonalds. He also took a job at an Olive Garden on the westside of Detroit. Around this time, Thomas met his wife, De-De Mosley, at the Detroit Center Seventh-day Adventist Church. They then moved to Huntsville, Alabama, attended Oakwood University, and they were married as college students.

Thomas spent twelve years working toward an undergraduate degree at Oakwood and graduated in 2001. While in Huntsville, Thomas preached and set up a program to help underachieved youth.

== Career ==
=== Michigan State University ===
In 2003, Thomas took a job with Michigan State University (MSU) along with a fellowship to attend MSU to complete his master's degree in K-12 Administration with an emphasis in Educational Leadership. He worked as an academic advisor to students with unrealized potential at MSU. At MSU, he helped develop an undergraduate retention program called The Advantage with fellow academic advisor and motivational speaker DeAndre Carter which targeted academically high-risk Black and Latino students. He also served as senior pastor at A Place of Change Ministries (APOC Ministries) in Lansing, Michigan. Thomas attained a master's degree from MSU in 2005, and a PhD in Education Administration in 2015.

=== Motivational speaker ===
Thomas has given motivational talks to collegiate and professional athletes. Thomas has appeared on Fox News to discuss his work, and portions of his sermons can be heard on the track "Intro" of deep house producers Disclosure's 2013 debut album, Settle and on the intro track "Wins and Losses" to rapper Meek Mill's 2017 album of the same name. In 2020, he reunited with Disclosure to speak on the song "Energy", which was released as the lead track from their third album Energy.
