= Ugly (Slowthai album) =

2023 studio album by Slowthai

Studio album by Slowthai
- Released: March 3, 2023
- Genre: Post-punk; punk rock; hip hop; grime; indie rock
- Length: 38:39
- Label: Method; Interscope
- Producer: Jacob Budgen; Dan Carey; Kwes Darko; Ethan P. Flynn; Zach Nahome; Sega Bodega

Slowthai chronology
Tyron (2021)	Ugly (2023)

Singles from UGLY
- 1. "Selfish" Released: 25 January 2023; 2. "Feel Good" Released: 7 February 2023

Ugly (also referred to as UGLY, an acronym for "U Gotta Love Yourself") is the third studio album by British rapper Slowthai. It was released on 3 March 2023 through Method Records and Interscope Records. The album features Slowthai introducing punk and rock elements to his sound, which received acclaim from critics.

== Background ==
Ugly comes after Slowthai's critically acclaimed 2021 album, Tyron. On 25 January 2023, Slowthai released the song "Selfish", and revealed the album's title that same day.

On 7 February 2023, Slowthai released the song "Feel Good". In a statement, Slowthai revealed that he "wanted to emulate the brotherhood ethos that bands have". In an interview with The Fader, Slowthai discussed how this is his most personal album yet and the new direction he has taken sonically. In another interview with Apple Music after the release of the album, he stated the following: "delving into this gave me that freedom again, I felt inspired. I wanted to do something new and challenge myself, rather than just doing what's expected of me."

The title track features Irish post-punk band Fontaines D.C., whom Slowthai met at the 2019 Mercury Prize ceremony, performing the instrumental. Jockstrap's Taylor Skye helped produce the song "Tourniquet".

== Critical reception ==
Professional ratings
Aggregate scores
Source	Rating
AnyDecentMusic?	7.5/10
Metacritic	80/100
Review scores
Source	Rating
AllMusic	4/5 stars
Clash	7/10
The Daily Telegraph	4/5 stars
DIY	5/5 stars
The Guardian	5/5 stars
The Independent	4/5 stars
The Line of Best Fit	8/10
NME	5/5 stars
Pitchfork	5.5/10
Slant Magazine	3.5/5 stars

Upon release, Ugly was met with widespread acclaim from music critics. At Metacritic, which assigns a normalised rating out of 100 to reviews from mainstream critics, the album received an average score of 80, based on 16 critical reviews, indicating "universal acclaim".

Robin Murray of Clash called the album "a bold attempt to embrace [Slowthai's] contradictions" and "held together by the brutal strength of slowthai's performances." Lisa Wright of DIY gave the album five stars and commented, "Ugly is a beautiful thing to behold." Alexis Petridis of The Guardian gave the album five stars and named it the album of the week, calling it "severe, noisy and occasionally pushing." Helen Brown of The Independent commented, "On Ugly, he uses rock music as an alarm bell to jolt himself back to reality." Hayley Milross of The Line of Best Fit wrote that "Ugly displays an artistic freedom regained, reconnecting with what drew him to music in the first place. It's a creative direction that will most likely not stick around, but that's what makes it that bit more authentic." Thomas Smith of NME opined that the album "is a warts-and-all reckoning" and Slowthai's "most exhilarating project to date from front to back." Reviewing the album for AllMusic, Paul Simpson concluded that, "Ugly is less of a major stylistic shift than it might seem, as slowthai harnesses his punkish energy in a way that seems natural and fitting. It's clearly a challenging, confrontational album, but it also feels like the artist's purest expression yet."

== Track listing ==
Ugly track listing
No.	Title	Writer(s)	Producer(s)	Length
1.	"Yum"	Tyron Frampton; Dan Carey	D. Carey; Zach Nahome	4:21
2.	"Selfish"	Frampton; D. Carey; Kwes Darko	D. Carey; Darko	3:12
3.	"Sooner"	Frampton; Daniele Pace; Ethan P. Flynn; Lorenzo Pilat; Mario Panzeri; Peter Callander	Flynn; D. Carey^{[a]}	2:54
4.	"Feel Good"	Frampton; D. Carey; Darko; Sega Bodega	Darko; Sega Bodega; D. Carey^{[a]}	2:04
5.	"Never Again"	Frampton; D. Carey; Darko; Flynn	D. Carey; Darko	4:32
6.	"Fuck It Puppet"	Frampton; D. Carey; Darko; Nahome	D. Carey; Darko; Nahome^{[a]}	1:13
7.	"Happy"	Frampton; D. Carey; Darko; Nahome; Jacob Budgen	D. Carey; Nahome; Darko^{[a]}; Budgen^{[a]}	3:02
8.	"Ugly"	Frampton; D. Carey; Darko	D. Carey; Darko	4:22
9.	"Falling"	Frampton; D. Carey; Darko	Darko; Budgen; Nahome; D. Carey^{[a]}	2:53
10.	"Wotz Funny"	Frampton; D. Carey; Nahome; Liam Toon; Nahome	D. Carey; Darko^{[a]}; Nahome^{[a]}; Budgen^{[a]}	2:39
11.	"Tourniquet"	Frampton; Flynn	Flynn; Taylor Skye^{[c]}	3:47
12.	"25% Club"	Frampton; D. Carey; Oly Carey	D. Carey; Darko^{[a]}	3:34
Total length:				38:39

Notes:

- "Happy" and "Ugly" are stylized in all caps.
- ^{^[c]} signifies a co-producer.
- ^{^[a]} signifies an additional producer.

== Personnel ==
=== Musicians ===
- Tyron Frampton – vocals, keyboards
- Yuri Shibuichi – drums (tracks 2, 3, 10)
- Blane Muise – background vocals (4)
- Liam Toon – drums (4, 5, 9–11)
- Carlos O'Connell – background vocals (8)
- Grian Chatten – background vocals (8)
- Conor Deegan – bass guitar (8)
- Tom Coll – drums (8)
- Conor Curley – electric guitar (8)
- Oly Carey – background vocals (12)

=== Production ===
- Christian Wright – mastering
- Jacob Bugden – mixing
- Dan Carey – mixing
- Alexis Smith, Andrea Cozzaglio – engineering

== Charts ==
Chart performance for Ugly
Chart (2023)	Peak position
Australian Albums (ARIA)	85
Belgian Albums (Ultratop Flanders)	26
Belgian Albums (Ultratop Wallonia)	109
Dutch Albums (Album Top 100)	85
French Albums (SNEP)	165
Irish Albums (OCC)	3
Lithuanian Albums (AGATA)	66
New Zealand Albums (RMNZ)	30
Scottish Albums (OCC)	3
Swiss Albums (Schweizer Hitparade)	91
UK Albums (OCC)	2
UK R&B Albums (OCC)	1
