= Alchemy (Disclosure album) =

Studio album by Disclosure
- Released: 14 July 2023
- Length: 37:37
- Label: Apollo; AWAL
- Producer: Cirkut; DonnyBravo; Guy Lawrence; Howard Lawrence; Max Margolis

Disclosure chronology
Energy (2020)	Alchemy (2023)	Alchemy – Remixes (2023)

Alchemy is the fourth studio album by British electronic music duo Disclosure. It was released on 14 July 2023 through Apollo and AWAL. it is the duo's first album in nearly 3 years since Energy (2020).

== Background ==
In 2022, Howard Lawrence started working on the album in Los Angeles with collaborators Max Margolis and DonnyBravo. He would send concepts and demos over to his brother Guy Lawrence, who was still in London at the time. In a press release, Guy noted that the album is a "celebration of us feeling liberated" and cited creative freedom as one of the cornerstones during the process, following their departure from a major record label. Howard added that the time during which the record was conceived was a "combination of deep heartbreak and sadness, but also deep admiration and appreciation", since Guy got previously married and settled in Los Angeles, while Howard stayed in London, feeling exhausted after a heartbreak and a 150-date tour.

The album marks the first project to not include any guest appearances or samples. Instead, the album focused on Howard's "pop songcraft", using his own lyrics and vocals, while Guy takes on "everything from jungle breaks and trance-like supersaw synth riffs to rapid tempo four-to-the-floor club tracks" production-wise. The duo described the sound as going "back to basics". On 12 July, they announced the record, along with revealing the album cover and tracklist. Arriving shortly after the 10-year anniversary of their debut album Settle, Alchemy is set to be their first album to be released independently via their AWAL imprint, Apollo Records.

== Critical reception ==
Professional ratings
Review scores
Source	Rating
The Line of Best Fit	7/10
NME	4/5 stars
Pitchfork	7.4/10

Philip Sherburne of Pitchfork called it "fresher and more fun than the brothers have sounded in ages" and thought that it is "clearly meant as a reboot, repositioning them as dance artists who happen to make hits, rather than chart aspirants dabbling in club tropes". Sherburne concluded that "it sounds like they're listening to what's happening in clubland and asking themselves not what they can poach for the charts, but what they can bring to the table". David Cobbald of The Line of Best Fit described the album as "a story in two parts, each showcasing the two sides to the duality of Disclosure" and summarised that "with this album they bring those two sides to one party, and while it's not their masterpiece, it's still a great record".

== Track listing ==
Alchemy track listing
No.	Title	Writer(s)	Length
1.	"Looking for Love"	Guy Lawrence; Howard Lawrence; Max Margolis; Donald Philp	4:50
2.	"Simply Won't Do"	G. Lawrence; H. Lawrence; Margolis; Philp	3:26
3.	"Higher Than Ever Before"	G. Lawrence; H. Lawrence; Henry Walter	3:16
4.	"A Little Bit"	G. Lawrence; H. Lawrence; Margolis; Philp	3:29
5.	"Go the Distance"	G. Lawrence; H. Lawrence; Margolis; Philp	4:16
6.	"Someday..."	G. Lawrence; H. Lawrence	0:45
7.	"We Were in Love"	G. Lawrence; H. Lawrence	5:00
8.	"Sun Showers"	G. Lawrence; H. Lawrence	4:34
9.	"Purify"	G. Lawrence; H. Lawrence	2:04
10.	"Brown Eyes"	G. Lawrence; H. Lawrence; Margolis; Philp	2:31
11.	"Talk on the Phone"	G. Lawrence; H. Lawrence; Robin Lawrence; Margolis; Philp	3:26
Total length:			37:37

== Personnel ==
Disclosure

- Guy Lawrence – production, mixing, engineering
- Howard Lawrence – production

Additional contributors

- DonnyBravo – production (tracks 1, 2, 4, 5, 10, 11)
- Max Margolis – production (1, 2, 4, 5, 10, 11)
- Cirkut – production (3)
- Matt Colton – mastering

== Charts ==
Chart performance for Alchemy
Chart (2023)	Peak position
UK Album Downloads (Official Charts)	12
UK Dance Albums (Official Charts)	1
US Top Dance Albums (Billboard)	15
