= Blick Bassy =

Cameroonian singer-songwriter

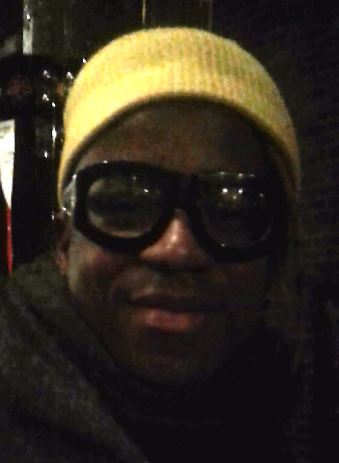
- Born: Mintaba, Cameroon
- Occupation: Singer-songwriter

Blick Bassy is a Bassa singer-songwriter from Cameroon. Bassy writes his songs in his native language, Bassa. His song "Kiki", from Akö, featured as the theme song for the worldwide launch of the iPhone 6 in 2015.

== Early life ==
Bassy was born in Mintaba, Cameroon, one of 21 offspring from his father, a police chief. His mother was the youngest of his father's three wives.

He began singing at the age of three, waking up at 5am every day to rehearse with the other children of the village.

== Musical career ==
Bassy's band Macase toured Cameroon for ten years until winning the Prix Elysse Musique du Monde in 2001, which convinced Bassy to immigrate to Paris, France. After performing in small venues, he secured a recording deal for his first two albums. The first, entitled Leman, was released in 2009, and was followed two years later by Hongo Calling. In February 2023, Blick Bassy was appointed co-director of the Memory Commission on Cameroon with Karine Ramondy; this commission is responsible for working on France's action in Cameroon during colonization and after Cameroon's independence. He performs singing and playing guitar with the French musician Clément Petit on the cello.

=== Akö ===
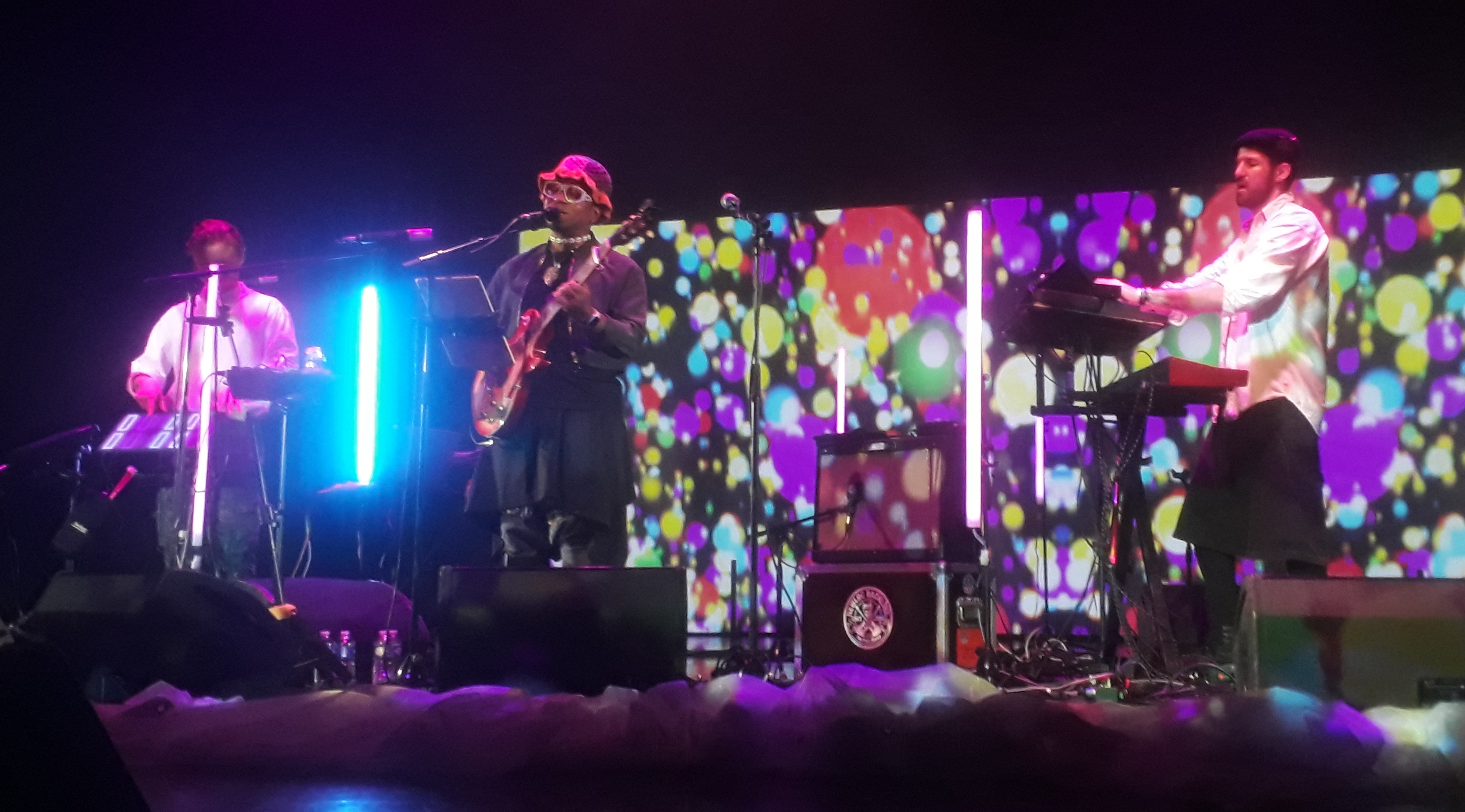
Blick Bassy in concert at Le Rocher de Palmer (near Bordeaux) on December 9, 2023, accompanied by Arno de Cazanove on synth and trumpet, and Romain Jovion on synth-pad.

In 2015, Bassy released the album Akö, from which 15 seconds of "Kiki" were used in Apple's global advertising campaign for the iPhone 6. Bassy says that the album was influenced by Skip James, the American blues musician. Robin Denselow, writing in The Guardian, says of Bassa: "...his new album echoes the delicacy of bossa nova along with reminders of his other influences, from African styles to the Mississippi blues of his hero Skip James. This is an easy-going but experimental set in which he plays guitar and banjo, sings in the Cameroonian language of Bassa, and is backed by the unlikely combination of cello and trombone. He starts by showing off his distinctive voice on a cool, drifting late-night ballad, but then changes direction as he swings into a breezy song that sounds like an African answer to a country-blues hoe-down, before mixing Congolese influences with impressive, bluesy guitar work. A charming, intriguing set." David Honigmann in the Financial Times describes the album's genre as manouche jazz, and describes "lubricious trombone slides" on "Kiki" and the "relentless Gypsy vamping" of "Wap Do Wap".

Bassy has toured globally, performing at the Royal Festival Hall, London, in the Africa Utopia festival in 2015, and at WOMAD in New Zealand in 2018. He played the Vancouver Folk Music Festival in July 2018.

Bassy's lyrics are in Bassa, one of 260 Cameroonian languages.

=== 1958 ===
Bassy dedicated this album to the memory of Ruben Um Nyobè, whom he considers one of his political heroes and who was killed in 1958. The album presents as a comprehensive report of events during the 70 years since the death of Um Nyobè. The track "Mpodol" is Ruben's nickname and accuses modern Cameroonians of sabotaging their own homeland.
