= Lord Apex =

British musician (born 1996)

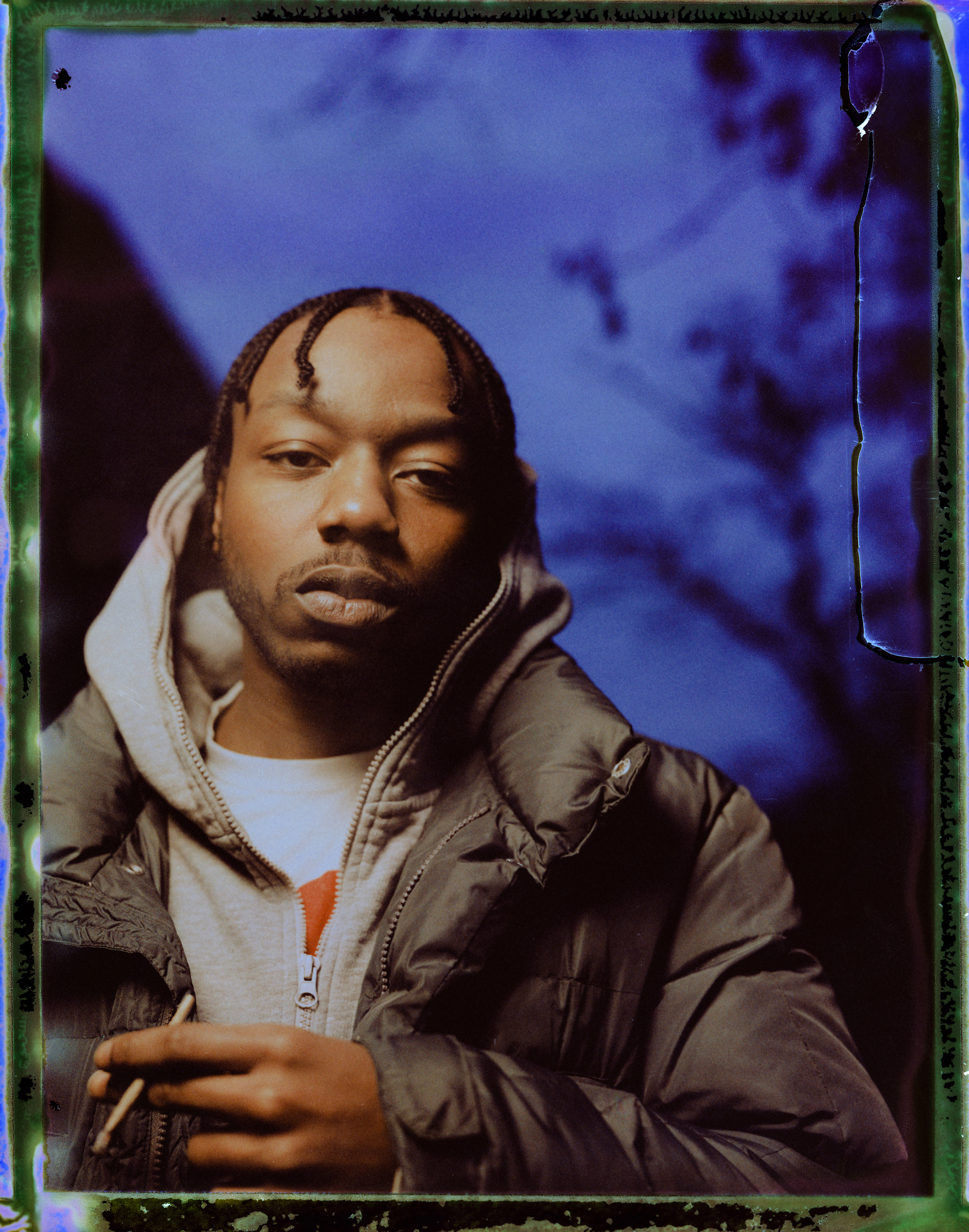

Background information
- Born: Shaeem Wright; 12 June 1996 (age 29); White City, West London, England
- Genres: Hip hop; Alternative hip hop
- Years active: 2013–present
- Label: Believe Digital
- Website: www.lordapex.com

Shaeem Santino Wright (born 12 July 1996) known as Lord Apex, is a British MC who grew up in White City, London, United Kingdom. His music crosses multiple styles of rap, including UK hip-hop, alternative hip hop, and lo-fi hip hop.

== Style and projects ==
Apex's stage name was inspired by hip-hop producer Madlib's alter ego, Quasimoto aka Lord Quas.

Apex frequently states that he doesn't like to be put into any one genre with his music. Journalists, and Apex himself, often reference lo-fi, 90s US hip hop acts like J Dilla and MF Doom as influences. He often also talks about his love for anime and vintage clothing, both of which have inspired the visuals for his music and his general aesthetic.

Since releasing his first track in 2014, Apex has seen over 7 million views on his YouTube channel, with 50,000 subscribers as of February 2021. Apex also appeared on the popular German music YouTube channel COLORS, where he performed his track Vintage Garms.

He has also featured in promotions, and released his own radio segment, for the US hip hop affiliated workwear brand Carhartt.

In 2020 he released a studio album with New York-based producer V-Don called Supply and Demand. Reviewers noted Apex's "swaggering and ominous" vocal delivery and "off-kilter flow" throughout the Supply and Demand project. The album featured several other prominent American rappers, such as Murs of Rhymesayers Entertainment and CJ Fly of the Pro Era collective. Another feature on the record was from New York's Westside Gunn, formerly of Shady Records, on the deluxe version track London Fog.

As well as his collaboration with Carhartt, he was also part of a promotional campaign for musical equipment maker Novation Digital Music Systems, featuring a live performance of his track Miyagi Blueprint using their Launchpad X.

In 2020 Lord Apex was nominated for a UK Music Video Award in the Best Hip Hop/Grime/Rap Video Newcomer category, for his video with Kam-Bu entitled Different. In January 2021, he featured on Complex's 21 UK Rappers to Watch in 2021 list, in which they said he is "perfectly positioned to rise to the top."

== Touring career ==
- Black on Both Sides 20th Anniversary Tour w/ Yasiin Bey (April 2020)
- EUROPE 22 Tour w/ Freddie Gibbs (March/April 2022)
- Smoke Sessions Europe Tour (April/May 2022)

== Discography ==
=== Albums/Mixtapes ===
- Smoke Sessions, Volume One (2016)
- Smoke Sessions, Vol. 2 (2019)
- Supply & Demand (with V Don) (2020)
- Smoke Sessions 3 (2021)
- Off the Strength (2022)
- THE ELEVATED AND ELUSIVE (with Drae Da Skimask) (2023)
- The Good Fight (2023)

=== EPs ===
- Gxlden Era (as Tino Apex) (2013)
- C.R.A.T.E. Diggin' (as Tino Apex) (2013)
- VIRTUAL DOJO 1996 (2014)
- Hyōkō meisō (elevation/meditation) (2015)
- Sounds of the Blade (with Tunami) (2015)
- Live from Los Santos (with N2Deep) (2015)
- Vinyl Dust (2016)
- HMEM2 (2016)
- Lord Vibes (with Lo Vibe) (2016)
- Bamboo Forest (with Walterwarm) (2016)
- Cosmos/Genesis (2016)
- INTERPLANETARY FUNK (2017)
- Stuck in Motion (with Finn Foxell & Flowzart) (2018)
- S.O.I.L (with The Kount) (2018)
- Darkskies (with Bushi Vibes) (2020)
- HIGHSOLATION (2020)
