= Talk (Khalid song) =

Single by Khalid

from the album Free Spirit
- Released: February 7, 2019
- Recorded: 2018
- Genre: Electro-R&B
- Length: 3:17: 3:01 (radio edit)
- Label: RCA
- Songwriters: Khalid; Guy Lawrence; Howard Lawrence
- Producer: Disclosure

Khalid singles chronology
"Saturday Nights Remix" (2019)	"Talk" (2019)	"Beautiful People" (2019)

Music video
- "Talk" on YouTube

"Talk" is a song by American singer Khalid. It was written by Khalid and produced by English electronic music duo Disclosure. It was released on February 7, 2019, as the first single from Khalid's second studio album, Free Spirit. (Note: Khalid's own Spotify account previously stated on one of its playlists "New song "Talk" with Disclosure on 2/7", but now no longer does. However, the quote is still archived by Google and can be searched.) The song also appeared in the deluxe edition of Disclosure's third studio album, Energy. "Talk" became Khalid's fifth top 10 hit and highest-charting single as a solo artist in the US, peaking at number three on the Billboard Hot 100. The song was nominated for Record of the Year at the 62nd Grammy Awards.

Billboard ranked "Talk" 29th on their 100 Best Songs of 2019 list.

== Music and composition ==
"Talk" is a midtempo, R&B-tinged song that runs for 3 minutes and 17 seconds. It features production and songwriting by English electronic music duo Disclosure, who incorporate synths that "bubble and twinkle above a staccato bass". Carolyn Bernucca of Complex magazine noted how Khalid "opts for a more mature vocal sound [...] without losing the youthful charm he's employed since American Teen".

Speaking on the conception of the song, Khalid said he initially met up with Disclosure, and they played him what he called a "crazy-ass instrumental". Khalid described "Talk" as the first taste of his second album, with the song's theme being "the beginning honeymoon stages of a relationship". Rap-Up said the song finds the singer "navigating the waters of a relationship".

== Promotion and release ==
Khalid officially announced the song on Twitter on February 4, 2019, posting the cover art, which shows a purple wolf behind red flames. In late January, he had posted a video of himself listening to a clip of the song in his car. "Talk" was premiered as Zane Lowe's World Record on Apple Music's Beats 1 radio on February 7, 2019, and released the same day.

On August 28, 2020, "Talk" was also included as the 18th track in the deluxe edition of Disclosure's third studio album, Energy.

== Chart performance ==
The song would go on to reach a peak of number three for four non-consecutive weeks on the Billboard Hot 100, and spent 11 weeks at the top of the Hot 100 Airplay chart, in addition to topping the Pop Songs, Rhythmic Songs, and Hip-Hop/R&B Airplay charts.

== Remixes ==
Disclosure, who produced the original song, released their own house remix of "Talk" on March 29, 2019. This version of the song is titled "Talk (Disclosure VIP)".

A second official remix of "Talk" with American rappers Megan Thee Stallion and Yo Gotti was released on April 12, 2019. Billboard magazine reacted positively to Megan's verse, calling it "steamy", and complimented her singing but was less approving of Yo Gotti's feature, saying his "appearance feels much like he just stumbled into the wrong house and didn't know what he was getting himself into".

== Charts ==
=== Weekly charts ===
Chart (2019–2020)	Peak position
Australia (ARIA)	4
Austria (Ö3 Austria Top 40)	63
Belgium (Ultratop 50 Flanders)	35
Belgium (Ultratop 50 Wallonia)	17
Canada Hot 100 (Billboard)	14
Canada AC (Billboard)	24
Canada CHR/Top 40 (Billboard)	5
Canada Hot AC (Billboard)	14
Czech Republic Singles Digital (ČNS IFPI)	35
Denmark (Tracklisten)	9
France (SNEP)	97
Germany (GfK)	88
Greece International (IFPI Greece)	24
Hungary (Stream Top 40)	33
Ireland (IRMA)	8
Lithuania (AGATA)	12
Malaysia (RIM)	9
Netherlands (Dutch Top 40)	15
Netherlands (Single Top 100)	19
New Zealand (Recorded Music NZ)	1
Norway (VG-lista)	22
Portugal (AFP)	25
Scottish Singles Sales (Official Charts)	35
Singapore (RIAS)	12
Slovakia Singles Digital (ČNS IFPI)	22
South Korea (Gaon)	105
Sweden (Sverigetopplistan)	32
Switzerland (Schweizer Hitparade)	50
UK Singles (Official Charts)	9
US Billboard Hot 100	3
US Adult Contemporary (Billboard)	21
US Adult Pop Airplay (Billboard)	10
US Dance Club Songs (Billboard)	8
US Dance Airplay (Billboard)	3
US Hot R&B/Hip-Hop Songs (Billboard)	2
US Pop Airplay (Billboard)	1
US Rhythmic Airplay (Billboard)	1
US Rolling Stone Top 100	11

=== Year-end charts ===
Chart (2019)	Position
Australia (ARIA)	17
Belgium (Ultratop Wallonia)	80
Canada (Canadian Hot 100)	22
Denmark (Tracklisten)	42
Ireland (IRMA)	42
Latvia (LAIPA)	67
Netherlands (Dutch Top 40)	82
Netherlands (Single Top 100)	67
New Zealand (Recorded Music NZ)	7
Portugal (AFP)	69
UK Singles (Official Charts Company)	43
US Billboard Hot 100	8
US Adult Top 40 (Billboard)	32
US Dance/Mix Show Airplay (Billboard)	5
US Hot R&B/Hip-Hop Songs (Billboard)	3
US Mainstream Top 40 (Billboard)	6
US Rhythmic (Billboard)	2
US Rolling Stone Top 100	10

== Certifications ==
Region	Certification	Certified units/sales
Australia (ARIA)	4× Platinum	280,000^{‡}
Austria (IFPI Austria)	Gold	15,000^{‡}
Brazil (Pro-Música Brasil)	Diamond	160,000^{‡}
Canada (Music Canada)	6× Platinum	480,000^{‡}
Denmark (IFPI Danmark)	Platinum	90,000^{‡}
France (SNEP)	Gold	100,000^{‡}
Mexico (AMPROFON)	2× Platinum	120,000^{‡}
New Zealand (RMNZ)	4× Platinum	120,000^{‡}
Norway (IFPI Norway)	Gold	30,000^{‡}
Poland (ZPAV)	Gold	25,000^{‡}
Portugal (AFP)	Gold	5,000^{‡}
Switzerland (IFPI Switzerland)	Gold	10,000^{‡}
United Kingdom (BPI)	Platinum	600,000^{‡}
United States (RIAA)	7× Platinum	7,000,000^{‡}
^{‡} Sales+streaming figures based on certification alone.
