= My High =

Single by Disclosure, Aminé and Slowthai

from the album Energy
- Released: 3 July 2020
- Genre: Hip house
- Label: Island
- Songwriter(s): Howard Lawrence; Guy Lawrence; Adam Daniel; Tyron Frampton
- Producer(s): Disclosure

Disclosure singles chronology
"Energy" (2020)	"My High" (2020)	"Douha (Mali Mali)" (2020)

Aminé singles chronology
"Compensating" (2020)	"My High" (2020)	"Charmander" (2021)

Slowthai singles chronology
"BB (Bodybag)" (2020)	"My High" (2020)	"Feel Away" (2020)

"My High" is a song by British electronic music duo Disclosure, American rapper Aminé and British rapper Slowthai. It was released as the fourth single from the duo's third studio album Energy on 3 July 2020. The song was written by Howard Lawrence, Guy Lawrence, Adam Daniel and Tyron Frampton. The song was nominated for the 2021 Grammy Awards for "Best Dance Recording".

== Background ==
In a statement, Guy and Howard Lawrence said, "We always wanted to work with rappers, we just didn't know any and we had no means of contacting them… there's not a lot of rappers in Reigate [Surrey, hometown]. Writing My High with Amine was a lot a fun, he's hilarious and may as well be a comedian. He writes so quickly and it's amazing to watch. He brought so much energy to this already very energetic tune that when we got home to London in January there was only one guy capable of matching it… Slowthai."

== Music video ==
A music video to accompany the release of "My High" was first released onto YouTube on 30 June 2020. The video was directed by Simon Cahn. The music video was filmed in Mexico City and Los Angeles. It follows a car accident victim as he tries to get medical attention and instead is thrust forth while on a stretcher through an increasingly absurd series of settings including a family dinner, a house party and a dollar store. Aminé and Slowthai both make appearances.

== Track listing ==
- Digital download
1. "My High" – 4:54
- Digital download
1. "My High" (edit) – 3:12

== Charts ==
Chart (2020)	Peak position
New Zealand Hot Singles (RMNZ)	15
UK Dance (OCC)	23
UK Singles (OCC)	86
US Hot Dance/Electronic Songs (Billboard)	43

== Release history ==
Region	Date	Format	Label
Various	3 July 2020	Digital download; streaming	Island
