= Disclosure (band) =

English electronic music duo

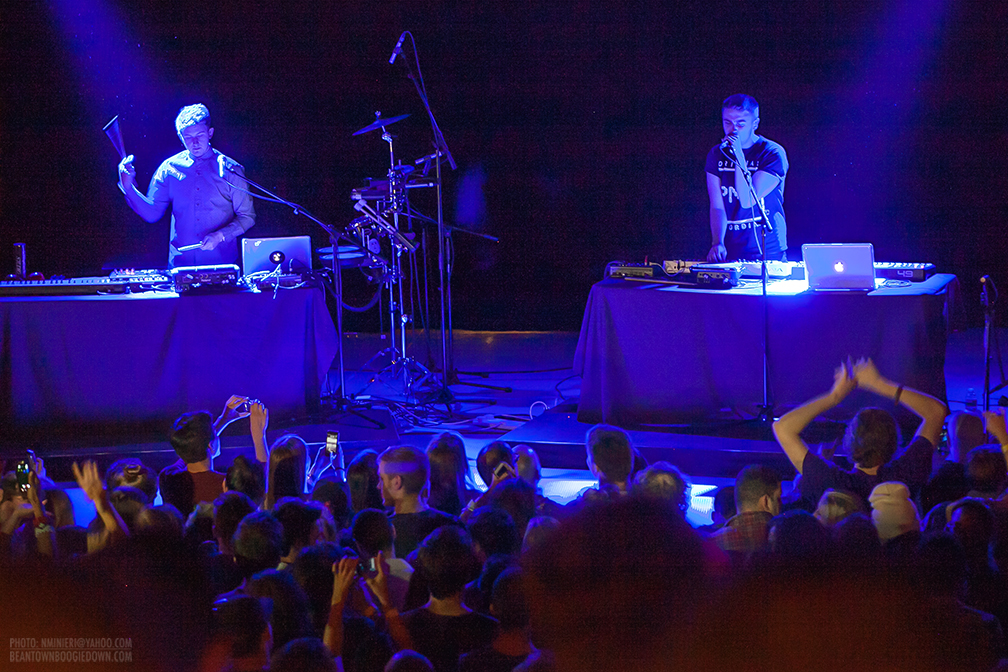
- Disclosure performing in 2013

Background information
- Origin: Reigate, Surrey, England
- Genres: House; deep house; UK garage; funky house; future garage; UK funky; 2-step garage; dance-pop; UK bass; deep tech; EDM; jungle
- Years active: 2010–present
- Labels: PMR; Island; Greco-Roman; Moshi Moshi; Transparent; Make Mine; Cherrytree; Interscope
- Members: Guy Lawrence; Howard Lawrence
- Website: disclosureofficial.com

Disclosure is an English electronic music duo consisting of two brothers Howard (born 11 May 1994) and Guy Lawrence (born 25 May 1991). They grew up in Reigate, Surrey. Their debut studio album, Settle, released on 3 June 2013, by PMR Records, was nominated for Best Dance/Electronica Album at the 2014 Grammy Awards. They released a second studio album, Caracal, on 25 September 2015 which was also nominated for Best Dance/Electronic Album at the 2016 Grammy Awards. Their third studio album, Energy, was released on 28 August 2020, and was nominated for Best Dance/Electronic Album at the 2021 Grammy Awards, alongside the fourth single from the album, "My High", which was nominated for Best Dance Recording.

== Early life ==
Disclosure were born to professional musician parents. Their father played in rock bands, including 'No Angry Man' and 'The Look Book' alongside his brother and Guy's godfather, and is now a professional auctioneer, whilst their mother, a session musician, fronted bands, toured on cruises, sang advert jingles, and was one of the first performers to entertain the British Army after their recapture of the Falkland Islands. Guy started playing the drums at the age of three, and Howard started playing the bass at the age of eight. Both also learned to play the guitar and the piano and Howard to sing.

They both attended Reigate College. During this period, the boys studied music and music technology. By the age of 15, Howard listened mainly to funk, soul and maudlin singers, whilst Guy listened predominantly to hip hop, dubstep and was the drummer in an indie-style guitar band with school friends.

== Career ==
Whilst Guy was attending Reigate College, he enjoyed studying classical music, especially the likes of Bach and Claude Debussy. A teenage interest in the music and production techniques of Detroit-based rapper and record producer J Dilla, led him through hip-hop to attending dubstep gigs as a student; but he enjoyed house music more as a creation, and began studying it and introducing his brother to it. Primarily influenced by artists including Joy Orbison, James Blake, Burial and Mount Kimbie, the brothers were led back in time to Chicago house, Detroit techno, UK garage and 2-step garage.

=== 2010–2011: Debut ===
The brothers started de-constructing and copying the music that Guy had heard at gigs in a room above their father's auction house, and then making music in the same room in a style they refer to as "electronic house music with a pop structure", uploading it to Myspace. This got them an early record deal, and a UK tour, mixing live music gigs with occasional DJ sets, where in Manchester, they played a set before Todd Edwards, and gained after the gig an all-night conversation.

The duo's first single, "Offline Dexterity" was released on 29 August 2010. They signed to the new PMR record label on its formation in January 2011, and released their second single, "Carnival"/"I Love...That You Know" on 13 June 2011. This got them a management deal with Sam Evitt and Jack Street's Method Management whom they are still managed by.

=== 2012–2014: Commercial success and Settle ===
Disclosure picked up their first significant national radio support upon the release of the "Tenderly" / "Flow" single in January 2012. The single led to significant interest in the subsequent June 2012 EP, The Face, released on Greco-Roman. The EP included the popular remix of "Running" by Jessie Ware a fellow PMR artist which charted in both the Netherlands and Belgium, as well as becoming a fixture of the 2012 Festival Circuit and featuring on the annual edition of Annie Mac presents.

Through collaboration with other artists signed to Method Management, the group had their first UK hit in October 2012 with "Latch", co-written with Jimmy Napes and featuring the vocals from Sam Smith, which peaked at number 11 in the UK singles chart.

The group maintained their momentum into 2013 – they were voted into the BBC Radio 1xtra 'Hot Ten For 2013' and scored two consecutive top 10 hit singles in "White Noise" (number two) (with AlunaGeorge) and "You & Me" (number 10) (with Eliza Doolittle). These three singles were collected on an EP, The Singles. They released their debut studio album, Settle, by PMR Records on 3 June 2013 and was met with commercial and critical success, debuting at number one on the UK Albums Chart, charting in many countries across Europe and Australia, and receiving four stars from The Guardian and a 9.1 score on Pitchfork. They performed twice at Glastonbury Festival 2013 and appeared on Later... with Jools Holland. The album was nominated for a Grammy Award for Best Dance Album.

In 2013, Disclosure embarked on a worldwide tour of more than 40 European, American, and Canadian cities, including high-profile music festivals such as the Coachella Valley Music and Arts Festival, Lollapalooza Music Festival in Chicago, and Sasquatch! Music Festival in Washington State. The same year, they established the record label Method Records; its roster includes Friend Within, Karen Harding, Lxury, and Tourist. A sub label was introduced in February 2015, called Method White, releasing more underground tracks through it. The first release was "Wolfsbane" by Jonas Rathsman. Since then, MJ Cole and Eats Everything have released tracks through the label. Disclosure's song "When a Fire Starts to Burn" was used in the sixth episode of the first season of The 100.

=== 2015–2018: Caracal and hiatus ===
Following the worldwide success of their debut studio album, Settle and a worldwide tour, the duo began working on their second studio album, Caracal, featuring vocals from Sam Smith, Lorde, Gregory Porter, Lion Babe, Kwabs, The Weeknd, Nao, Miguel, Jordan Rakei and Brendan Reilly. The week of its release, Caracal earned the group their second consecutive number one album in the UK Albums Chart.

The music videos for official singles from the album published on YouTube are interconnected and follow a story line, each newly released video furthering the plot. The videos follow a young woman in a sci-fi, dystopian world who is, for some unknown reason, being chased by the police.

Three singles were released prior to the album: "Omen", "Holding On" and "Jaded". Two promotional singles were also released: "Willing and Able" and "Hourglass". The album was released on 25 September 2015, by PMR Records and Island Records. The album was also nominated for Best Dance/Electronica Album at the 2016 Grammy Awards.

In February 2017, the duo announced they were to take a year's hiatus with the exception of "a few special things", including performances with BBC Radio 1 in Ibiza and the return of their festival Wildlife that summer.

=== 2018–present: Energy and Alchemy ===
In January 2018, the duo confirmed that they were in the process of recording their third studio album set for release in early 2020, with a single due in between late 2019 and early 2020. After a hiatus, Disclosure released a song in May 2018 called "Ultimatum" featuring Fatoumata Diawara. In August 2018, five new songs were released over a daily basis: "Moonlight", "Where Angels Fear to Tread", "Love Can Be So Hard", "Funky Sensation" and "Where You Come From". In October 2019 Disclosure performed at the Trafalgar Square leg of Extinction Rebellion's "International Rebellion" protest. The singles, furthermore, announced their comeback into the studio and revealed that they had started to write and produce new material, which would eventually form their third studio album. On 24 February 2020 they released a new track titled "Ecstasy", followed by four tracks released on a daily basis: "Tondo", "Expressing What Matters", "Etran" and "Get Close". An EP titled Ecstasy, which contained the five tracks, was released on 28 February. On the album's release date, Disclosure will have a special Minecraft server for The Energy Minecraft Experience. The music video "My High" featuring Aminé and Slowthai was nominated for Best Editor at the Berlin Music Video Awards 2021. The editor of this music videos is Yorgos Lamprinos.

On 12 July 2023, the duo announced their fourth studio album, Alchemy, which was released on 14 July.

The duo headlined Primavera Sound in Barcelona on 31 May 2024, where they performed their first live set since 2016.

== Discography ==
- Settle (2013)
- Caracal (2015)
- Energy (2020)
- Alchemy (2023)

== Awards and nominations ==
Award	Year	Category	Nominee(s)	Result	Ref.
Berlin Music Video Awards	2014	Best Director	"When a Fire Starts to Burn"	Nominated	
Berlin Music Video Awards	2021	Best Editor	"My High" (with Aminé and Slowthai)	Nominated	
Berlin Music Video Awards	2025	Best Cinematography	"She's Gone, Dance On"	Won	
Brit Awards	2014	Best British Breakthrough Act	Disclosure	Nominated	
Brit Awards	2014	British Group	Disclosure	Nominated	
Brit Awards	2014	British Album of the Year	Settle	Nominated	
Brit Awards	2014	British Single of the Year	"White Noise" (with AlunaGeorge)	Nominated	
Camerimage	2014	Best Music Video	"Grab Her!"	Nominated	
D&AD Awards	2022	Narrative	"My High" (with Aminé and Slowthai)	Wood Pencil	
D&AD Awards	2022	Direction	"My High" (with Aminé and Slowthai)	Graphite Pencil	
D&AD Awards	2022	Editing	"My High" (with Aminé and Slowthai)	Nominated	
DJ Awards	2014	Best Electronic Live Performance	Disclosure	Won	
DJ Awards	2015	Best Electronica DJ	Disclosure	Won	
DJ Mag Best of British Awards	2013	Best Album	Settle	Won	
DJ Mag Best of British Awards	2013	Best Tune	"White Noise" (with AlunaGeorge)	Nominated	
Electronic Dance Music Awards	2023	Remix of the Year	"Unholy" (Disclosure remix)	Nominated	
Electronic Dance Music Awards	2023	Best Down Tempo Turned Up	"Unholy" (Disclosure remix)	Nominated	
Electronic Dance Music Awards	2025	House Song of the Year	"She's Gone, Dance On"	Nominated	
European Border Breakers Awards	2014	Album of the Year (UK)	Settle	Won	
European Festival Awards	2014	Newcomer of the Year	Disclosure	Nominated	
European Festival Awards	2017	Remixer of the Year	Disclosure	Nominated	
Grammy Awards	2014	Best Dance/Electronica Album	Settle	Nominated	
Grammy Awards	2015	Best Dance Recording	"F for You" (featuring Mary J. Blige)	Nominated	
Grammy Awards	2016	Best Dance/Electronica Album	Caracal	Nominated	
Grammy Awards	2019	Best Dance Recording	"Ultimatum" (featuring Fatoumata Diawara)	Nominated	
Grammy Awards	2020	Record of the Year	"Talk" (Khalid featuring Disclosure)	Nominated	
Grammy Awards	2021	Best Dance/Electronica Album	Energy	Nominated	
Grammy Awards	2021	Best Dance Recording	"My High" (featuring Aminé and Slowthai)	Nominated	
Grammy Awards	2024	Best Dance/Electronic Recording	"Higher Than Ever Before"	Nominated	
Grammy Awards	2025	Best Dance/Electronic Recording	"She's Gone, Dance On"	Nominated	
Grammy Awards	2026	Best Dance/Electronic Recording	"No Cap" (with Anderson .Paak)	Nominated	
International Dance Music Awards	2013	Best Breakthrough Artist (Group)	Disclosure	Nominated	
International Dance Music Awards	2014	Best Full Length Studio Recording	Settle	Nominated	
International Dance Music Awards	2014	Best House/Garage/Deep House Track	"Latch" (featuring Sam Smith)	Won	
International Dance Music Awards	2014	Best Music Video	"Latch" (featuring Sam Smith)	Nominated	
International Dance Music Awards	2014	Best Featured Vocalist Performance	"Latch" (featuring Sam Smith)	Nominated	
International Dance Music Awards	2015	Best Featured Vocalist Performance	"F for You" (featuring Mary J. Blige)	Nominated	
International Dance Music Awards	2015	Best House/Garage/Deep House Track	"F for You" (featuring Mary J. Blige)	Nominated	
International Dance Music Awards	2016	Best House/Garage/Deep House Track	"Holding On" (featuring Gregory Porter)	Nominated	
International Dance Music Awards	2016	Best Featured Vocalist Performance	"Holding On" (featuring Gregory Porter)	Nominated	
International Dance Music Awards	2016	Best Music Video	"Holding On" (featuring Gregory Porter)	Nominated	
International Dance Music Awards	2016	Best Artist (Group)	Disclosure	Nominated	
International Dance Music Awards	2016	Best Full Length Studio Recording	Caracal	Won	
Ivor Novello Awards	2014	Most Performed Work	"Latch" (featuring Sam Smith)	Nominated	
Libera Awards	2022	Best Dance Record	DJ-Kicks: Disclosure	Nominated	
MOBO Awards	2013	Best Male Act	Disclosure	Nominated	
MOBO Awards	2013	Best Album	Settle	Nominated	
MOBO Awards	2013	Best Song	"White Noise" (with AlunaGeorge)	Nominated	
MTV Video Music Awards	2014	MTV Clubland Award	"Grab Her!"	Nominated	
MTV Video Music Awards	2014	Best Visual Effects	"Grab Her!"	Nominated	
MTV Video Music Awards Japan	2014	Best Dance Video	"F for You" (featuring Mary J. Blige)	Nominated	
MTV Video Music Awards Japan	2016	Best Dance Video	"Magnets" (featuring Lorde)	Nominated	
mtvU Woodie Awards	2014	Woodie of the Year	Disclosure	Nominated	
mtvU Woodie Awards	2014	Best Video Woodie	"Grab Her"	Nominated	
NME Awards	2015	Best British Band	Themselves	Nominated	
NME Awards	2015	Best Track	"White Noise" (with AlunaGeorge)	Won	
Popjustice £20 Music Prize	2013	Best British Pop Single	"White Noise" (with AlunaGeorge)	Nominated	
Q Awards	2013	Best New Act	Themselves	Nominated	
Rober Awards Music Poll	2013	Breakthrough Artist	Themselves	Nominated	
Rober Awards Music Poll	2013	Best Dance Anthem	"When a Fire Starts to Burn"	Nominated	
Teen Choice Awards	2014	Choice Music: Electronic Music Dance Song	"Latch" (featuring Sam Smith)	Nominated	
UK Festival Awards	2013	Anthem of the Summer	"White Noise" (with AlunaGeorge)	Nominated	
UK Music Video Awards	2012	Best Dance Video – Budget	"Control" (featuring Ria Ritchie)	Nominated	
UK Music Video Awards	2014	Best Visual Effects	"Grab Her"	Nominated	
UK Music Video Awards	2014	Best Dance Video – UK	"Grab Her"	Won	
UK Music Video Awards	2014	Best Music AD	Settle	Won	
UK Music Video Awards	2016	Best Dance Video – UK	"Magnets" (featuring Lorde)	Nominated	
UK Music Video Awards	2020	Best Editing in a Video	"My High" (with Aminé and Slowthai)	Nominated	
UK Music Video Awards	2020	Best Dance/Electronic Video – UK	"My High" (with Aminé and Slowthai)	Won	
UK Music Video Awards	2020	Best Dance/Electronic Video – UK	"Energy"	Nominated	
UK Music Video Awards	2021	Best R&B/Soul Video – UK	"Birthday"	Nominated	
UK Music Video Awards	2021	Best Production Design in a Video	"Birthday"	Nominated	
UK Music Video Awards	2025	Best Dance / Electronic Video – UK	"Arachnids"	Nominated	
UK Music Video Awards	2025	Best Casting in a Video	"Arachnids"	Nominated	
UK Music Video Awards	2025	Best Editing in a Video	"Arachnids"	Nominated	
World Music Awards	2014	World's Best Live Act	Themselves	Nominated	
World Music Awards	2014	World's Best Song	"White Noise" (with AlunaGeorge)	Nominated	
World Music Awards	2014	World's Best Song	"You & Me"	Nominated	
World Music Awards	2014	World's Best Video	"You & Me"	Nominated	
