= Disclosure discography =

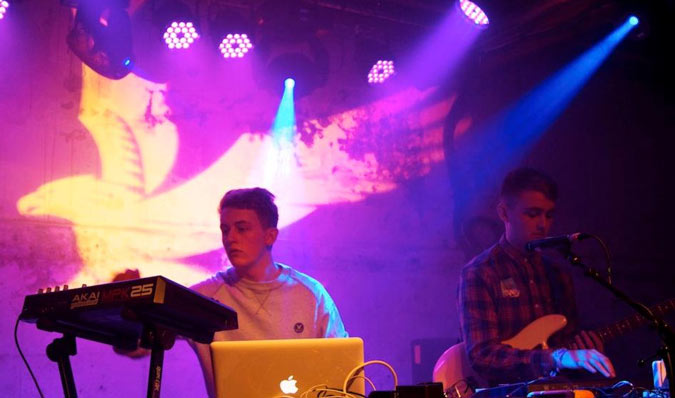
- Disclosure performing in 2011
- Studio albums: 4
- EPs: 10
- Singles: 43
- Promotional singles: 6
- DJ mixes: 7

English electronic music duo Disclosure has released four studio albums, 10 extended plays, seven DJ mixes, 43 singles and six promotional singles.

Their debut studio album, Settle, was released in June 2013, peaking at number one on the UK Albums Chart. The duo scored their first UK hit in October 2012 with "Latch", featuring vocals from English singer Sam Smith. The song peaked at number 11 on the UK Singles Chart. "White Noise" was released as the second single from the album in February 2013, reaching number two on the UK Singles Chart. "You & Me" was released as the third single from the album in April 2013, peaking at number 10 on the UK Singles Chart. "F for You" was released as the fourth single from the album in August 2013. The single was re-released in February 2014 with Mary J. Blige providing guest vocals. "Help Me Lose My Mind" was released as the album's fifth single in October 2013. "Voices" was released as the album's sixth single in December 2013.

The duo's second studio album, Caracal, was released in September 2015. "Bang That" was released as a promotional single in May 2015; however, the song appears on the deluxe edition of the album instead of the standard edition. "Holding On", featuring American jazz musician Gregory Porter, was released as the album's lead single. The song peaked at number 46 in the UK Singles Chart. Disclosure's second collaboration with Smith, "Omen", was released as the second single from the album in July 2015, reaching number 13 on the UK Singles Chart.

== Albums ==
=== Studio albums ===
List of studio albums, with selected chart positions and certifications
Title	Details	Peak chart positions										Sales	Certifications
Title	Details	UK	AUS	BEL (FL)	FRA	IRE	NL	NOR	NZ	SWI	US	Sales	Certifications
Settle	Released: 31 May 2013; Label: PMR, Island; Formats: CD, LP, digital download, streaming	1	5	8	89	10	24	19	15	76	36	US: 165,000	BPI: 2× Platinum; ARIA: Platinum; RMNZ: 2× Platinum
Caracal	Released: 25 September 2015; Label: PMR, Island; Formats: CD, LP, digital download, streaming	1	2	6	28	3	7	16	3	14	9		BPI: Gold; RMNZ: Platinum
Energy	Released: 28 August 2020; Label: Island; Formats: CD, LP, cassette, digital download, streaming	4	12	75	132	11	25	—	39	38	48		BPI: Silver
Alchemy	Released: 14 July 2023; Label: Apollo, AWAL; Formats: Digital download, streaming	—	—	—	—	—	—	—	—	—	—		
"—" denotes a recording that did not chart or was not released in that territory.

=== Remix albums ===
List of remix albums
Title	Details
Settle: The Remixes	Released: 17 December 2013; Label: PMR, Island; Formats: Digital download

== Extended plays ==
List of extended plays
Title	Details	Peak chart positions	
Title	Details	UK Dance	AUS
Carnival	Released: 5 July 2011; Label: Self-released	—	—
The Face	Released: 4 June 2012; Label: Greco-Roman	—	—
Control	Released: 2 April 2013; Label: Greco-Roman	—	—
The Singles	Released: 30 April 2013; Label: Cherrytree, Interscope	—	—
Caracal: Live BBC Session	Released: 16 October 2015; Label: Island	—	—
Moog for Love	Released: 15 June 2016; Label: Island	—	80
Moonlight	Released: 7 December 2018; Label: Island	10	—
Ecstasy	Released: 28 February 2020; Label: Island	—	—
Never Enough	Released: 20 August 2021; Label: Island	3	—
The Singles Vol. 2	Released: 28 November 2025; Label: Apollo, AWAL	—	—
"—" denotes an EP that did not chart or was not released.

== DJ mixes ==
List of DJ mixes
Title	Details
Boiler Room: Disclosure in Shanghai, May 1, 2016	Released: 1 May 2016
Boiler Room: Disclosure, Streaming From Isolation, Apr 10, 2020	Released: 10 April 2020
Big Tree Energy Radio, Vol. 1	Released: 4 September 2020
Big Tree Energy Radio, Vol. 2	Released: 4 September 2020
Big Tree Energy Radio, Vol. 3	Released: 4 September 2020
NYE 2021	Released: 23 December 2020
DJ-Kicks	Released: 15 October 2021

== Singles ==
List of singles, with year released, selected chart positions and certifications, and album name shown
Title	Year	Peak chart positions										Certifications	Album
Title	Year	UK	AUS	BEL (FL)	CAN	FRA	IRE	NL	NZ	SCO	US	Certifications	Album
"Offline Dexterity / Street Light Chronicle"	2010	—	—	—	—	—	—	—	—	—	—		Non-album singles
"Tenderly / Flow"	2012	—	—	— (Note: "Tenderly" did not enter the Ultratop 50, but peaked at number 66 on the Flemish Ultratip chart.)	—	—	—	—	—	—	—		Non-album singles
"Boiling" (featuring Sinéad Harnett)	2012	—	—	—	—	—	—	—	—	—	—		The Face
"Latch" (featuring Sam Smith)	2012	11	47	22	6	8	35	60	39	22	7	BPI: 4× Platinum; ARIA: Platinum; MC: 2× Platinum; RIAA: 3× Platinum; RMNZ: 8× Platinum	Settle
"White Noise" (featuring AlunaGeorge)	2013	2	68	19	—	—	51	—	—	10	—	BPI: 3× Platinum; RMNZ: Platinum	Settle
"You & Me" (featuring Eliza Doolittle)	2013	10	91	— (Note: "You & Me" did not enter the Ultratop 50, but peaked at number seven on the Flemish Ultratip chart.)	—	2	66	59	—	27	— (Note: "You & Me" did not enter the Billboard Hot 100, but peaked at number 19 on the Hot Dance/Electronic Songs chart.)	BPI: 3× Platinum; ARIA: 3× Platinum; RMNZ: 5× Platinum	Settle
"When a Fire Starts to Burn"	2013	177	—	—	—	183	—	—	—	—	—	BPI: Silver; ARIA: Platinum; RMNZ: Gold	Settle
"F for You" (solo or featuring Mary J. Blige)	2013	20	—	— (Note: "F for You" did not enter the Ultratop 50, but peaked at number seven on the Flemish Ultratip chart.)	—	—	46	—	—	25	— (Note: "F for You" did not enter the Billboard Hot 100, but peaked at number 37 on the Hot Dance/Electronic Songs chart.)	BPI: Gold	Settle
"Help Me Lose My Mind" (featuring London Grammar)	2013	56	—	— (Note: "Help Me Lose My Mind" did not enter the Ultratop 50, but peaked at number 27 on the Flemish Ultratip chart.)	—	—	97	—	—	72	— (Note: "Help Me Lose My Mind" did not enter the Billboard Hot 100, but peaked at number 45 on the Hot Dance/Electronic Songs chart.)	BPI: Gold; RMNZ: Platinum	Settle
"Voices" (featuring Sasha Keable)	2014	176	—	— (Note: "Voices" did not enter the Ultratop 50, but peaked at number 54 on the Flemish Ultratip chart.)	—	—	—	—	—	—	—		Settle
"The Mechanism" (with Friend Within)	2014	145	—	—	—	—	—	—	—	—	—		Non-album single
"Holding On" (featuring Gregory Porter)	2015	46	77	— (Note: "Holding On" did not enter the Ultratop 50, but peaked at number 13 on the Flemish Ultratip chart.)	—	50	—	69	—	34	— (Note: "Holding On" did not enter the Billboard Hot 100, but peaked at number 17 on the Hot Dance/Electronic Songs chart.)	BPI: Silver	Caracal
"Omen" (featuring Sam Smith)	2015	13	29	— (Note: "Omen" did not enter the Ultratop 50, but peaked at number two on the Flemish Ultratip chart.)	43	66	29	27	8	12	64	BPI: Platinum; RIAA: Gold; RMNZ: 2× Platinum	Caracal
"Jaded"	2015	87	—	— (Note: "Jaded" did not enter the Ultratop 50, but peaked at number eight on the Flemish Ultratip chart.)	—	—	—	—	—	—	— (Note: "Jaded" did not enter the Billboard Hot 100, but peaked at number 30 on the Hot Dance/Electronic Songs chart.)		Caracal
"Magnets" (featuring Lorde)	2015	71	14	33	58	87	64	74	2	63	— (Note: "Magnets" did not enter the Billboard Hot 100, but peaked at number two on the Bubbling Under Hot 100 Singles chart.)	BPI: Silver; ARIA: 3× Platinum; RMNZ: 2× Platinum	Caracal
"Nocturnal" (featuring The Weeknd)	2016	103	—	—	—	179	—	—	—	—	— (Note: "Nocturnal" did not enter the Billboard Hot 100, but peaked at number 16 on the Hot Dance/Electronic Songs chart.)		Caracal
"Moog for Love"	2016	—	—	—	—	—	—	—	—	—	—		Moog for Love
"Ultimatum" (featuring Fatoumata Diawara)	2018	—	—	— (Note: "Ultimatum" did not enter the Ultratop 50, but peaked at number five on the Flemish Ultratip chart.)	—	149	—	—	—	—	— (Note: "Ultimatum" did not enter the Billboard Hot 100, but peaked at number 35 on the Hot Dance/Electronic Songs chart.)		Les Voix Du Sahel
"Moonlight"	2018	—	—	—	—	—	—	—	—	—	— (Note: "Moonlight" did not enter the Billboard Hot 100, but peaked at number 45 on the Hot Dance/Electronic Songs chart.)		Moonlight
"Where Angels Fear to Tread"	2018	—	—	—	—	—	—	—	—	—	— (Note: "Where Angels Fear to Tread" did not enter the Billboard Hot 100, but peaked at number 39 on the Hot Dance/Electronic Songs chart.)		Moonlight
"Love Can Be So Hard"	2018	—	—	—	—	—	—	—	—	—	—		Moonlight
"Funky Sensation" (featuring Gwen McCrae)	2018	—	—	— (Note: "Funky Sensation" did not enter the Ultratop 50, but charted as an extra tip on the Flemish Bubbling Under chart.)	—	—	—	—	—	—	—		Moonlight
"Where You Come From"	2018	—	—	—	—	—	—	—	—	—	—		Moonlight
"Know Your Worth" (with Khalid)	2020	27	31	— (Note: "Know Your Worth" did not enter the Ultratop 50, but peaked at number six on the Flemish Ultratip chart.)	46	—	25	33	31	90	57	BPI: Platinum; ARIA: Platinum; RMNZ: 2× Platinum	Energy (Note: "Know Your Worth" and "Ecstasy" only appears on the deluxe edition of Energy.)
"Ecstasy"	2020	—	—	— (Note: "Ecstasy" did not enter the Ultratop 50, but charted as an extra tip on the Flemish Bubbling Under chart.)	—	—	—	—	—	—	— (Note: "Ecstasy" did not enter the Billboard Hot 100, but peaked at number 34 on the Hot Dance/Electronic Songs chart.)		Energy
"Energy"	2020	—	—	— (Note: "Energy" did not enter the Ultratop 50, but peaked at number 23 on the Flemish Ultratip chart.)	—	—	—	—	—	—	— (Note: "Energy" did not enter the Billboard Hot 100, but peaked at number 22 on the Hot Dance/Electronic Songs chart.)		Energy
"My High" (with Aminé and Slowthai)	2020	86	—	—	—	—	—	—	— (Note: "My High" did not enter the NZ Top 40 Singles Chart but peaked at number 15 on the NZ Hot Singles Chart.)	—	— (Note: "My High" did not enter the Billboard Hot 100, but peaked at number 45 on the Hot Dance/Electronic Songs chart.)		Energy
"Douha (Mali Mali)" (with Fatoumata Diawara)	2020	83	—	— (Note: "Douha (Mali Mali)" did not enter the Ultratop 50, but peaked at number 35 on the Flemish Ultratip chart.)	—	—	—	—	—	—	— (Note: "Douha (Mali Mali)" did not enter the Billboard Hot 100, but peaked at number 25 on the Hot Dance/Electronic Songs chart.)		Energy
"Birthday" (with Kehlani and Syd)	2020	81	—	— (Note: "Birthday" did not enter the Ultratop 50, but charted as an extra tip on the Flemish Bubbling Under chart.)	—	—	—	— (Note: "Birthday" did not enter the Netherlands' Single Top 100 but peaked at number 20 on the Netherlands' Single Tip Chart.)	— (Note: "Birthday" did not enter the NZ Top 40 Singles Chart but peaked at number 14 on the NZ Hot Singles Chart.)	—	— (Note: "Birthday" did not enter the Billboard Hot 100, but peaked at number 25 on the Hot Dance/Electronic Songs chart.)		Energy
"Watch Your Step" (with Kelis)	2020	—	—	— (Note: "Watch Your Step" did not enter the Ultratop 50, but peaked at number 45 on the Flemish Ultratip chart.)	—	—	—	—	—	—	— (Note: "Watch Your Step" did not enter the Billboard Hot 100, but peaked at number 34 on the Hot Dance/Electronic Songs chart.)		Energy
"In My Arms"	2021	—	—	—	—	—	—	—	— (Note: "In My Arms" did not enter the NZ Top 40 Singles Chart but peaked at number 26 on the NZ Hot Singles Chart.)	—	— (Note: "In My Arms" did not enter the Billboard Hot 100, but peaked at number 31 on the Hot Dance/Electronic Songs chart.)		Never Enough
"Happening"	2021	—	—	—	—	—	—	—	—	—	—		Never Enough
"Seduction"	2021	—	—	—	—	—	—	—	—	—	—		Never Enough
"You've Got to Let Go If You Want to Be Free" (with Zedd)	2022	—	—	—	—	—	—	—	—	×	— (Note: "You've Got to Let Go If You Want to Be Free" did not enter the Billboard Hot 100, but peaked at number 15 on the Hot Dance/Electronic Songs chart.)		Non-album singles
"Waterfall" (with Raye)	2022	67	—	—	—	—	—	—	— (Note: "Waterfall" did not enter the NZ Top 40 Singles Chart but peaked at number 24 on the NZ Hot Singles Chart.)	×	— (Note: "Waterfall" did not enter the Billboard Hot 100, but peaked at number 25 on the Hot Dance/Electronic Songs chart.)	BPI: Silver; RMNZ: Gold	Non-album singles
"She's Gone, Dance On"	2024	52	—	—	—	—	87	—	— (Note: "She's Gone, Dance On" did not enter the NZ Top 40 Singles Chart, but peaked at number eight on the NZ Hot Singles Chart.)	×	— (Note: "She's Gone, Dance On" did not enter the Billboard Hot 100, but peaked at number 16 on the Hot Dance/Electronic Songs chart.)	BPI: Silver; ARIA: Gold; RMNZ: Gold	The Singles Vol. 2
"in2minds" (with Chris Lake)	2024	—	—	—	—	—	—	—	—	×	—		The Singles Vol. 2
"Arachnids"	2024	—	—	—	—	—	—	—	—	×	—		The Singles Vol. 2
"King Steps" (with Pa Salieu)	2024	—	—	—	—	—	—	—	—	×	—		The Singles Vol. 2
"No Cap" (with Anderson Paak)	2025	—	—	—	—	—	—	—	— (Note: "No Cap" did not enter the NZ Top 40 Singles Chart, but peaked at number 32 on the NZ Hot Singles Chart.)	×	— (Note: "No Cap" did not enter the Billboard Hot 100, but peaked at number 13 on the Hot Dance/Electronic Songs chart.)		The Singles Vol. 2
"One2Three" (with Chris Lake and Leven Kali)	2025	—	—	—	—	—	—	—	— (Note: "One2Three" did not enter the NZ Top 40 Singles Chart, but peaked at number 18 on the NZ Hot Singles Chart.)	×	— (Note: "One2Three" did not enter the Billboard Hot 100, but peaked at number 24 on the Hot Dance/Electronic Songs chart.)		The Singles Vol. 2
"Deeper" (with Leon Thomas)	2025	—	—	—	—	—	—	—	— (Note: "Deeper" did not enter the NZ Top 40 Singles Chart, but peaked at number 14 on the NZ Hot Singles Chart.)	×	— (Note: "Deeper" did not enter the Billboard Hot 100, but peaked at number 19 on the Hot Dance/Electronic Songs chart.)		TBA
"The Sun Comes Up Tremendous"	2026	—	—	—	—	—	—	—	— (Note: "The Sun Comes Up Tremendous" did not enter the NZ Top 40 Singles Chart, but peaked at number 22 on the NZ Hot Singles Chart.)	×	—		TBA
"—" denotes a recording that did not chart or was not released in that territory.

=== Promotional singles ===
List of promotional singles, with selected chart positions and certifications, showing year released and album name
Title	Year	Peak chart positions							Certifications	Album
Title	Year	UK	UK Dance	AUS	BEL (FL) Tip	FRA	NL Air	US Dance	Certifications	Album
"Bang That"	2015	50	14	94	37	—	—	37		Caracal (Note: "Bang That" is only included on the digital and Japanese deluxe editions of Caracal.)
"Willing and Able" (featuring Kwabs)	2015	70	18	78	—	116	—	22		Caracal
"Hourglass" (featuring Lion Babe)	2015	80	23	—	—	148	—	31		Caracal
"Tondo" (with Eko Roosevelt)	2020	—	—	—	16	—	30	24	BPI: Silver	Energy (Note: These songs are only included on the deluxe edition of Energy.)
"Expressing What Matters"	2020	—	—	—	—	—	—	46		Energy
"Etran" (with Etran Finatawa)	2020	—	—	—	—	—	—	—		Energy
"—" denotes a recording that did not chart or was not released in that territory.

== Other charted songs ==
List of other charted songs, with selected chart positions, showing year released and album name
Title	Year	Peak chart positions						Album
Title	Year	UK	BEL (FL) Tip	IRE	NZ Hot	US Club	US Dance	Album
"Together" (with Sam Smith, Nile Rodgers and Jimmy Napes)	2012	—	78	—	—	—	—	Settle
"Royals / White Noise" (Live from the BRITs) (with Lorde featuring AlunaGeorge)	2014	72	—	93	—	—	—	Non-album single
"Boss"	2016	120	—	—	—	1	29	Moog for Love
"Feel Like I Do" (with Al Green)	2016	—	21	—	—	—	—	Moog for Love
"Watch Your Step" (featuring Kelis)	2020	—	45	—	—	—	34	Energy
"Lavender" (featuring Channel Tres)	2020	—	—	—	—	—	44	Energy
"Looking for Love"	2023	—	—	—	—	—	48	Alchemy
"Higher Than Ever Before"	2023	—	—	—	19	—	25	Alchemy
"Lift Off!" (with Salute)	2024	—	—	—	31	—	—	True Magic
"—" denotes a recording that did not chart or was not released in that territory.

== Remixes ==
Year	Artist	Track	Title
2010	Everything Everything	"Photoshop Handsome"	Disclosure Remix
2011	Crystal Fighters	"At Home"	Disclosure Remix
2011	Emeli Sandé featuring Naughty Boy	"Daddy"	Disclosure Remix
2011	Jack Dixon	"Coconuts"	Disclosure Remix
2011	Jess Mills	"Live for What I'd Die For"	Disclosure Remix
2011	Q-Tip	"Work It Out"	Disclosure Booty Call Edit
2012	Artful Dodger featuring Lifford	"Please Don't Turn Me On"	Disclosure Remix
2012	Azari & III	"Manic"	Disclosure Remix
2012	Disclosure	"What's In Your Head"	Disclosure VIP
2012	Janet Jackson with Nelly	"Call on Me"	Disclosure Bootleg
2012	Jessie Ware	"Running"	Disclosure Remix; Disclosure Dub; Disclosure VIP
2014	Pharrell Williams featuring Jay-Z	"Frontin'"	Disclosure Re-Work
2014	Usher	"Good Kisser"	Disclosure Remix
2015	Disclosure featuring Lorde	"Magnets"	Disclosure VIP
2016	Disclosure featuring The Weeknd	"Nocturnal"	Disclosure VIP
2016	Flume featuring Kai	"Never Be like You"	Disclosure Remix
2016	James Blake	"Modern Soul"	Disclosure Remix
2019	Khalid	"Talk"	Disclosure VIP
2020	Disclosure featuring Kehlani and Syd	"Birthday"	Disclosure VIP Remix
2020	Tyga and Curtis Roach	"Bored In the House"	Disclosure Remix (unreleased)
2021	Doja Cat	"Streets"	Disclosure Remix
2022	Sam Smith featuring Kim Petras	"Unholy"	Disclosure Remix

== Songwriting and production credits ==
Title	Year	Artist(s)	Album	Contributing member(s)	Credits	Written with	Produced with
"You Stressin'"	2014	Bishop Nehru	Non-album single	Howard Lawrence (producer); Guy Lawrence (co-writer and producer)	Co-writer; producer	Markel Scott	—
"Make It to Me"	2014	Sam Smith	In the Lonely Hour	Howard Lawrence	Co-writer; producer	Samuel Smith; James Napier	Steve Fitzmaurice; Jimmy Napes
"Right Now"	2014	Mary J. Blige	The London Sessions	Howard Lawrence; Guy Lawrence	Co-writer; producer	Mary J. Blige; Samuel Smith; James Napier	—
"Follow" (with Disclosure)	2014	Mary J. Blige	The London Sessions	Howard Lawrence; Guy Lawrence	Collaborative artist; co-writer; producer	Mary J. Blige; James Napier	—
"Eggshells" (featuring Lianne La Havas)	2014	Aqualung	10 Figures	Howard Lawrence (co-writer and co-producer); Guy Lawrence (co-writer)	Co-writer; co-producer	Matthew Hales	Aqualung
"Wonderful"	2015	Lianne La Havas	Blood	Howard Lawrence	Co-writer	Lianne Barnes; Matthew Hales	—
"Writing's on the Wall"	2015	Sam Smith	Non-album single	Howard Lawrence; Guy Lawrence	Additional producer	—	Steve Fitzmaurice; Jimmy Napes
"Heal"	2015	Ellie Goulding	Delirium	Guy Lawrence	Co-writer; producer	Elena Goulding; James Napier	Jimmy Napes
"Borrowed Time"	2015	Frances	Things I've Never Said	Howard Lawrence	Co-writer; producer	Sophie Cooke	Frances
"Meant to Be"	2016	SG Lewis	Yours EP	Howard Lawrence	Co-writer	Samuel G. Lewis; Charles Hugo	—
"Open Your Eyes"	2016	Liv Dawson	Open Your Eyes EP	Guy Lawrence	Co-writer; producer	Olivia Dawson; James Napier; Oliver "Oz Moses" Thornton	—
"Searching"	2017	Liv Dawson	Non-album single	Howard Lawrence; Guy Lawrence	Co-writer; producer	Olivia Dawson; James Napier; Christian Karlsson; Pontus Winnberg; Henrik Jonback; Catherine Dennis	—
"Blinds"	2017	Aminé	Good for You	Guy Lawrence	Co-writer; producer	Adam Daniel	—
"Heaven Let Me In"	2018	Friendly Fires	Inflorescent	Howard Lawrence; Guy Lawrence	Co-writer; producer	Edward McFarlane	Friendly Fires; Alex Metric; Hal Ritson; Mark Ralph; Richard Adlam
"Talk"	2019	Khalid	Free Spirit	Howard Lawrence; Guy Lawrence	Co-writer; producer	Khalid Robinson	—
"I Feel Love"	2019	Sam Smith	Non-album single	Guy Lawrence	Producer	—	—
"Blue World"	2020	Mac Miller	Circles	Guy Lawrence	Co-writer; producer	Mac Miller; Jon Brion	—
"Ungodly Hour"	2020	Chloe x Halle	Ungodly Hour	Howard Lawrence; Guy Lawrence	Co-writer; producer	Chloe Bailey; Halle Bailey	—

== Other tracks ==
Year	Track	Date	Notes
2010	"Linstigator"	August 2010	
2010	"London Town"	August 2010	
2012	"My Intention is War (Fig II)"	30 April 2012	Moda Black (mixed by Jaymo and Andy George)
2012	"Get Close"	1 June 2012	Lovebox Jukebox number 26 – Greco-Roman Soundsystem
2013	"You Used to Hold Me" (feat. Natalie Duncan)	15 May 2013	Live at Maida Vale on BBC Radio 1 – unreleased
2015	"Hollywood"	July 2015	Beats 1 Radio – unreleased
