= Jimmy Napes =

English songwriter and record producer

- Born: James Napier; 18 September 1984 (age 42); London, England
- Genres: R&B; pop; house
- Occupations: Record producer; songwriter; singer
- Years active: 2012–present
- Label: Method

James Napier (born 18 September 1984), known professionally as Jimmy Napes, is an English songwriter and record producer. He has won a number of awards including an Academy Award, a Golden Globe Award, 3 Grammy Awards, and 2 Ivor Novello Awards. Napier is best known for his work with Sam Smith ("Stay with Me", "Writing's on the Wall", "Lay Me Down", "Too Good at Goodbyes", "Dancing with a Stranger", "Unholy"), Disclosure ("Latch", "You & Me", "White Noise", "Magnets"), Clean Bandit ("Rather Be")‚ Stormzy ("Crown"), and Taylor Swift ("Christmas Tree Farm"). Napier also has songwriting and producer credits with artists including Alicia Keys, Jess Glynne, Khalid, Normani, Kano, Dave, Rita Ora, Ellie Goulding, Mary J. Blige, Madonna, James Bay and more.

== Background ==
The son of John Napier, a British theatre designer, and Donna King, an American dancer and actress, Napes grew up in England. He started to go to University College School in Hampstead when he was 11.

In 2010, he worked with Eliza Doolittle on her album of the same name. Since then he has written for (and co-written with) several other artists, including Disclosure, Sam Smith, Clean Bandit and Mary J. Blige. In 2015, he earned a Grammy Award for Song of the Year for his work on Smith's "Stay with Me", co-written with Smith and Tourist. In the same year, Napes also won the Ivor Novello Award for Best Contemporary Song for co-writing Clean Bandit's "Rather Be". Napes released his debut EP as a singer, The Making of Me, on Method Records in March 2015. For co-writing "Writing's on the Wall" with Sam Smith, Napes won the Golden Globe Award and the Academy Award for Best Original Song.

Napes has a son, born in 2015. Sam Smith is a godparent to Napes' son.

== Discography ==
=== Extended plays ===
- The Making of Me (2015)

=== Songwriting and production credits ===
Year	Artist	Song	Album
2010	Eliza	"So High"	Eliza Doolittle
2012	Disclosure	"Latch" feat. Sam Smith	Settle
2013	Disclosure	"Voices" feat. Sasha Keable	Settle
2013	Disclosure	"White Noise" feat. AlunaGeorge	Settle
2013	Disclosure	"You & Me" feat. Eliza Doolittle	Settle
2013	Disclosure	"Together" with Sam Smith and Nile Rodgers	Settle
2013	Sam Smith	"Nirvana"	Nirvana EP
2013	Sam Smith	"Lay Me Down"	Nirvana EP
2013	Jessie Ware	"Imagine It Was Us"	Devotion
2013	Naughty Boy	"La La La" feat. Sam Smith	Hotel Cabana
2013	Clean Bandit	"Dust Clears" feat. Noonie Bao	New Eyes
2014	Clean Bandit	"Rather Be" feat. Jess Glynne	New Eyes
2014	Clean Bandit	"Extraordinary" feat. Sharna Bass	New Eyes
2014	Tourist	"I Can't Keep Up" feat. Will Heard	Patterns EP
2014	Sam Smith	"Stay with Me"	In the Lonely Hour
2014	Sam Smith	"Leave Your Lover"	In the Lonely Hour
2014	Sam Smith	"I'm Not the Only One"	In the Lonely Hour
2014	Sam Smith	"I've Told You Now"	In the Lonely Hour
2014	Sam Smith	"Like I Can"	In the Lonely Hour
2014	Sam Smith	"Lay Me Down" (re-release)	In the Lonely Hour
2014	Sam Smith	"Restart"	In the Lonely Hour
2014	Sam Smith	"Latch"	In the Lonely Hour
2014	Sam Smith	"Make It to Me"	In the Lonely Hour
2014	Gorgon City	"Unmissable" feat. Zak Abel	Sirens
2014	Ella Henderson	"Billie Holliday"	Chapter One
2014	Jessie Ware	"Pieces"	Tough Love
2014	Jessie Ware	"The Way We Are"	Tough Love
2014	Mary J. Blige	"Therapy"	The London Sessions
2014	Mary J. Blige	"Right Now"	The London Sessions
2014	Mary J. Blige	"Not Loving You"	The London Sessions
2014	Mary J. Blige	"When You're Gone"	The London Sessions
2014	Mary J. Blige	"Nobody But You"	The London Sessions
2014	Mary J. Blige	"Worth My Time"	The London Sessions
2014	Mary J. Blige & Disclosure	"Follow"	The London Sessions
2014	Madeon	"You're On" feat. Kyan	Adventure
2015	Chasing Grace	"Lost Time"	Nowhere Near Old Enough
2015	Madonna	"Best Night"	Rebel Heart
2015	Disclosure	"Holding On" feat. Gregory Porter	Caracal
2015	Disclosure	"Omen" feat. Sam Smith	Caracal
2015	Disclosure	"Jaded"	Caracal
2015	Disclosure	"Willing and Able" feat. Kwabs	Caracal
2015	Disclosure	"Hourglass" feat. Lion Babe	Caracal
2015	Disclosure	"Magnets" feat. Lorde	Caracal
2015	Disclosure	"Nocturnal" feat. The Weeknd	Caracal
2015	Disclosure	"Good Intentions" feat. Miguel	Caracal
2015	Disclosure	"Superego" feat. Nao	Caracal
2015	Disclosure	"Echoes"	Caracal
2015	Disclosure	"Masterpiece" feat. Jordan Rakei	Caracal
2015	Disclosure	"Molecules"	Caracal
2015	Disclosure	"Moving Mountains" feat. Brendan Reilly	Caracal
2015	Disclosure	"Afterthought"	Caracal
2015	Låpsley	"Hurt Me"	Long Way Home
2015	Kwabs	"Cheating on Me"	Love + War
2015	Ellie Goulding	"Heal"	Delirium
2015	Sam Smith	"Writing's on the Wall"	Spectre OST
2015	Sam Smith	"Drowning Shadows"	In the Lonely Hour: Drowning Shadows Edition
2015	Sam Smith	"Love Is a Losing Game"	In the Lonely Hour: Drowning Shadows Edition
2015	Sam Smith	"How Will I Know"	In the Lonely Hour: Drowning Shadows Edition
2015	Sam Smith	"Omen"	In the Lonely Hour: Drowning Shadows Edition
2015	Sam Smith	"Stay with Me" (Darkchild Remix) feat. Mary J. Blige	In the Lonely Hour: Drowning Shadows Edition
2015	Sam Smith	"I'm Not the Only One" feat. ASAP Rocky	In the Lonely Hour: Drowning Shadows Edition
2015	Sam Smith	"Lay Me Down" feat. John Legend	In the Lonely Hour: Drowning Shadows Edition
2016	Alicia Keys	"Hallelujah"	Here
2016	Dillon Francis	"Anywhere" feat. Will Heard	Non-album single
2016	Liv Dawson	"Reflection"	Open Your Eyes EP
2017	Liv Dawson	"Searching"	Non-album single
2017	Isaac Gracie	"Reverie"	Isaac Gracie
2017	Frances	"Cloud 9"	Things I've Never Said
2017	Frances	"It Isn't Like You"	Things I've Never Said
2017	Ardyn	"Together"	Bloom EP
2017	Ardyn	"Throwing Stones"	Bloom EP
2017	Ray BLK	"Doing Me"	Non-album single
2017	Tourist	"We Stayed Up All Night" feat. Ardyn	Wash EP
2017	Sam Smith	"Too Good at Goodbyes"	The Thrill of It All
2017	Sam Smith	"Pray" solo / feat. Logic	The Thrill of It All
2017	Sam Smith	"Burning"	The Thrill of It All
2017	Sam Smith	"Say It First"	The Thrill of It All
2017	Sam Smith	"One Last Song"	The Thrill of It All
2017	Sam Smith	"Midnight Train"	The Thrill of It All
2017	Sam Smith	"Baby, You Make Me Crazy"	The Thrill of It All
2017	Sam Smith	"No Peace" feat. Yebba	The Thrill of It All
2017	Sam Smith	"Nothing Left for You"	The Thrill of It All
2017	Sam Smith	"The Thrill of It All"	The Thrill of It All
2017	Sam Smith	"One Day at a Time"	The Thrill of It All
2017	Liv Dawson	"Hush"	Non-album single
2017	Liv Dawson	"Last Time"	Non-album single
2018	Albin Lee Meldau	"Before & After"	About You
2018	Isaac Gracie	"Telescope"	Isaac Gracie
2018	James Bay	"I Found You"	Electric Light
2018	Paul the PSM	"Lord Give Me Strength"	Secret Life of a Bad Man EP
2018	Lily Moore	"I Know I Wanna Be with You"	I Will Never Be EP
2018	Rita Ora	"Velvet Rope"	Phoenix
2019	Sam Smith & Normani	"Dancing with a Stranger"	Love Goes
2019	Mae Muller	"Anticlimax"	Non-album single
2019	Avicii	"Freak"	TIM
2019	Stormzy	"Crown"	Heavy Is the Head
2019	Icona Pop	"Next Mistake"	Non-album single
2019	Mabel	"I Belong to Me"	High Expectations
2019	Tori Kelly	"Change Your Mind"	Inspired by True Events
2019	Tori Kelly	"Sorry Would Go a Long Way"	Inspired by True Events
2019	Tori Kelly	"Language"	Inspired by True Events
2019	Tori Kelly	"Coffee"	Inspired by True Events
2019	Tori Kelly	"8/28/1997"	Inspired by True Events
2019	Tori Kelly	"Kid I Used to Know"	Inspired by True Events
2019	Tori Kelly	"Pretty Fades"	Inspired by True Events
2019	Tori Kelly	"3/2/1991"	Inspired by True Events
2019	Tori Kelly	"Actress"	Inspired by True Events
2019	Tori Kelly	"Until I Think of You"	Inspired by True Events
2019	Tori Kelly	"3/26/1994"	Inspired by True Events
2019	Tori Kelly	"Your Words"	Inspired by True Events
2019	Tori Kelly	"Before the Dawn"	Inspired by True Events
2019	Tori Kelly	"Until Forever"	Inspired by True Events
2019	Tori Kelly	"Minute to Myself"	Inspired by True Events
2019	Kano	"Got My Brandy, Got My Beats" feat. Lil Silva	Hoodies All Summer
2019	Kano	"SYM"	Hoodies All Summer
2019	Mae Muller	"Dick"	Non-album single
2019	Celine Dion	"For the Lover That I Lost"	Courage
2019	Taylor Swift	"Christmas Tree Farm"	Non-album single
2020	Khalid & Disclosure	"Know Your Worth"	Energy
2020	Sam Smith	"To Die For"	Love Goes
2020	Mae Muller	"I Don't Want Your Money"	Non-album single
2020	Sam Smith	"My Oasis" feat. Burna Boy	Love Goes
2020	Alicia Keys	"3 Hour Drive" feat. Sampha	Alicia
2020	Alicia Keys	"Gramercy Park"	Alicia
2020	Sam Smith	"For the Lover That I Lost"	Love Goes
2020	Sam Smith	"Breaking Hearts"	Love Goes
2020	Sam Smith	"Forgive Myself"	Love Goes
2023	Sam Smith & Madonna	" Vulgar"	Non-album single
2026	Jeremy Zucker	"Losing Someone (2022)"	Archive 001
