= Moog for Love =

EP by Disclosure
- Released: 15 June 2016
- Genre: Electronic
- Length: 15:18
- Label: Island; PMR
- Producer: Disclosure; Eats Everything

Disclosure chronology
Caracal: Live BBC Session (2015)	Moog for Love (2016)	Moonlight (2018)

Moog for Love is the sixth extended play recorded by British electronic music duo Disclosure, consisting of brothers Howard and Guy Lawrence. The three-track record was released on 15 June 2016, by the labels Island and PMR Records. 2016 was a year where the duo were developing their skills of writing material while on the road. Its title is named after the 1952 Eddie Jefferson song "Moody's Mood for Love". They did not have enough material to produce a full-length album, but wanted to have a record released for the summer of that year regardless. Featuring collaborations with Eats Everything and Al Green, the album garnered generally mixed to positive reviews from music critics, some calling it a significant improvement over the duo's second studio LP Caracal (2015). Upon its release, the album landed at number 80 on the Australian Singles Chart.

== Production ==
In 2016, Disclosure had developed their skills of writing songs while on tour, but did not have time to produce enough material for a full-length album. Regardless, the duo wanted to release a record for the summer, reasoning that they felt "strange" not issuing any material to the public in that season. Therefore, they created and distributed a three-track "clubby" extended play that went "back to the start." Moog for Love was Disclosure's first record not to feature writing contributions from Jimmy Napes, which Howard said also "feels quite strange." With the EP, Disclosure wanted to use more different track development formulas from what they used for making their previous records, Settle (2013) and Caracal (2015), reasoning that they would be making the same music over and over again if they kept making tracks the same way. However, they still had made songs in one similar way they did for Settle, in that there was some material only one of the members would work on, and after the song was finished, both members of the duo would decide if the track was ready for release and inclusion on the album.

== Composition ==
Moog for Love's opening cut, "Boss", written and arranged in a Los Angeles hotel room for a few days while on the road before being mixed and mastered at home, was the only song on the EP where Disclosure worked on a track together. Driven by a harsh drum loop, the song features singing from Howard Lawrence, his vocal track pitch-shifted down and filtered with EQing effects. The second track on the EP, "Feel Like I Do", is a remix of Al Green's 1972 song "I'm Still in Love with You". Guy found the song while listening to a batch of vinyl records, and when Disclosure asked Green and the track's label permission for use of samples of his recording, Green and the label enjoyed the track the duo had worked on and gave them multitrack stems of the original song for a much cleaner sound of the samples in the track. While the vocals are sped up in "Feel Like I Do," the strings, horns and electric guitar from Green's recording remain, with the addition electronic drums and "hazy effects" as Rolling Stone described. "Feel Like I Do" is the only track to not resemble the sound that was on Settle due to its slow tempo and feel.

The closing tropical house title track of Moog for Love was analyzed by a NME reviewer to borrow the rich sound that dominated Caracal while having the same tempo that was used for most tracks on Settle. He also noted that the elements of UK garage and house in "Boss" and the title song are similar to those present on tracks from Settle such as "When a Fire Starts to Burn". Instrumented with "warbled" synthesizers and a pounding bass drum, the song ends with a "hypnotising" sample of the track "Moody's Mood", sung and recorded by Brian McKnight. "Moody's Mood" is a cover of what the EP and its title track is named after, "Moody's Mood for Love". A song by Eddie Jefferson, its melody is derived from an improvised solo by jazz saxophonist James Moody. An a cappella group had written lyrics for the melody, and in the recording being sampled by the track, McKnight sings the melody and lyrics. The bassline in the track is also generated by a moog synthesizer.

== Release and promotion ==
Professional ratings
Review scores
Source	Rating
DIY	2/5 stars
NME	4/5
Pitchfork	6.0/10
Zumic	4.5/5 stars

On 11 June 2016, Disclosure premiered "Boss" at the United Kingdom Wildlife Festival, leading to an estatic reception from the audience according to NME. On 14 June 2016, "Moog for Love" had a "World Record" premiere on Zane Lowe's Apple Music show Beats 1. Both songs became Annie Mac's "Hottest Record In The World" for 15 June. First available for streaming 14 June 2016, PMR and Island Records released Moog for Love for digital download the next day. The EP garnered generally positive reviews upon its distribution, some reviewers calling it significantly better than Caracal. Praising it as a less "grown-up" dance release than Caracal, Lary Bartleet of NME wrote that with Moog for Love, "Disclosure are back in the club, where they belong, but… better."

Wired magazine called Moog for Love one of the "6 New Albums We Demand You Listen to Immediately" only for "Feel Like I Do", calling the song "the best Avalanches song the Avalanches didn’t make—and the top-down, sun-kissed track you need in your life right now." Rebecca Haithcoat, who wrote a review for Pitchfork, had a more mixed opinion, writing that while the release garners much of the same excitements as the "expert blend of sleek pop and those big, warm and happy belted house hooks of the ‘90s" that was on Settle, it was, much like Caracal, not as good as Disclosure's debut given that it was "uninspired" and that none of the songs on the EP were "immediate or necessary." Kyle Forward of DIY magazine was also disappointed with the EP, writing that the songs were only "reminders" of their old sound rather than being something much more than "indistinct nothingness" in addition to their previous sound.

== Track listing and credits ==
All tracks written, mixed, and produced by Guy Lawrence, and mastered by Lewis Hopkin; additional writing and production credits are noted.

Moog for Love – Standard version
No.	Title	Writer(s)	Producer	Length
1.	"Boss"	Guy Lawrence; Howard Lawrence	Disclosure	6:39
2.	"Feel Like I Do"	G. Lawrence	G. Lawrence	3:15
3.	"Moog for Love" (featuring Eats Everything)	G. Lawrence; Daniel Pierce	Disclosure; Eats Everything	5:24
Total length:				15:18

Additional credits

- Gus Pirelli – engineer on "Boss"

== Charts ==
Chart (2016)	Peak position
Australia Singles (ARIA)	80
Australia Dance Singles (ARIA)	13

== Release history ==
Region	Date	Format(s)	Label
Worldwide	15 June 2016	Digital download	Island; PMR
