= Walk (Kwabs song) =

2014 single by Kwabs

Single by Kwabs

from the album Love + War
- B-side: "Saved"
- Released: 26 September 2014
- Recorded: 2014
- Genre: Electropop; R&B; pop-soul
- Length: 3:34
- Label: Atlantic
- Songwriter(s): Jonny Lattimer; Kwabena Adjepong
- Producer(s): TMS

Kwabs singles chronology
| "Wrong or Right" (2014) | "Walk" (2014) | "Fight for Love" (2015) |

Alternative cover

Music video
- "Walk" on YouTube

Walk EP

EP by Kwabs
- Released: 3 October 2014
- Recorded: 2014
- Length: 16:44
- Label: Atlantic

Kwabs chronology
| Pray for Love (2014) | ''Walk EP'' (2014) | Love + War (2015) |

"Walk" is a song by British singer Kwabs, released on 26 September 2014 on Atlantic Records in the UK, becoming a minor hit. However, the song became hugely popular in Germany, reaching number one in January 2015. It also reached number one in Romania, while in Austria and Switzerland, the song reached the top five positions. It is also featured on the soundtrack of EA Sports video game FIFA 15. A version featuring Fetty Wap was released on 21 August 2015.

== Track listing ==
Digital – Atlantic Records – (Warner)
| No. | Title | Length |
|---|---|---|
| 1. | "Walk" | 3:34 |

Single – Atlantic Records – (Warner)
| No. | Title | Length |
|---|---|---|
| 1. | "Walk" | 3:34 |
| 2. | "Saved" | 3:56 |

Digital download
| No. | Title | Length |
|---|---|---|
| 1. | "Walk" (featuring Fetty Wap) | 3:46 |

== Walk EP ==
Kwabs also released an EP on 3 October 2014 on Atlantic with the following tracks:

| No. | Title | Length |
|---|---|---|
| 1. | "Walk" | 3:34 |
| 2. | "Saved" | 3:56 |
| 3. | "Walk" (Jaded Remix) (featuring Jaded) | 5:30 |
| 4. | "Walk" (Royce Wood Junior Remix) (featuring Royce Wood Junior) | 3:44 |

== Remix ==
Drum-and-bass producer Nu:Tone released a remix of the song in 2017.

== Chart performance ==
=== Weekly charts ===
| Chart (2014–2015) | Peak position |
|---|---|
| Austria (Ö3 Austria Top 40) | 3 |
| Belgium (Ultratip Bubbling Under Flanders) | 3 |
| Belgium (Ultratip Bubbling Under Wallonia) | 9 |
| Czech Republic (Rádio – Top 100) | 2 |
| Czech Republic (Singles Digitál Top 100) | 67 |
| Finland (Suomen virallinen lista) | 17 |
| Germany (GfK) | 1 |
| Greece Digital Songs (Billboard) | 3 |
| Hungary (Dance Top 40) | 24 |
| Hungary (Rádiós Top 40) | 1 |
| Hungary (Single Top 40) | 7 |
| Netherlands (Single Top 100) | 98 |
| Norway (VG-lista) | 12 |
| Poland (Polish Airplay Top 100) | 2 |
| Romania (Romanian Radio Airplay) | 1 |
| Slovakia (Rádio Top 100) | 9 |
| Slovakia (Singles Digitál Top 100) | 62 |
| Slovenia (SloTop50) | 17 |
| Sweden Heatseeker (Sverigetopplistan) | 9 |
| Switzerland (Schweizer Hitparade) | 4 |

=== Year-end charts ===
| Chart (2015) | Position |
|---|---|
| Austria (Ö3 Austria Top 40) | 45 |
| Germany (Official German Charts) | 45 |
| Hungary (Rádiós Top 40) | 14 |
| Hungary (Single Top 40) | 24 |
| Poland (ZPAV) | 18 |
| Slovenia (SloTop50) | 49 |
| Switzerland (Schweizer Hitparade) | 36 |

| Chart (2018) | Position |
|---|---|
| Hungary (Rádiós Top 40) | 97 |

| Chart (2022) | Position |
|---|---|
| Hungary (Rádiós Top 40) | 76 |

| Chart (2023) | Position |
|---|---|
| Hungary (Rádiós Top 40) | 83 |

== Certifications ==
| Region | Certification | Certified units/sales |
|---|---|---|
| Austria (IFPI Austria) | Gold | 15,000^{*} |
| Denmark (IFPI Danmark) | Gold | 45,000^{‡} |
| Germany (BVMI) | Platinum | 400,000^{‡} |
| New Zealand (RMNZ) | Gold | 15,000^{‡} |
| Norway (IFPI Norway) | Platinum | 10,000^{‡} |
| Poland (ZPAV) | Platinum | 50,000^{‡} |
| Switzerland (IFPI Switzerland) | Gold | 15,000^{‡} |
| United Kingdom (BPI) Featuring Fetty Wap | Silver | 200,000^{‡} |
^{*} Sales figures based on certification alone.^{‡} Sales+streaming figures based on certification alone.
