= Jaded (Disclosure song) =

Single by Disclosure

from the album Caracal
- Released: 1 August 2015
- Recorded: 2015
- Genre: Deep house; UK garage; synth-pop
- Length: 4:35
- Label: PMR; Island
- Songwriter(s): Howard Lawrence; Guy Lawrence; James Napier; Sam Romans
- Producer(s): Disclosure

Disclosure singles chronology
"Omen" (2015)	"Jaded" (2015)	"Magnets" (2015)

Music video
- "Disclosure – Jaded" on YouTube

"Jaded" is a song by British electronic music duo Disclosure. It was released worldwide on 1 August 2015 from the duo's second studio album, Caracal. The track was written by Howard Lawrence, Guy Lawrence, Sam Romans and Jimmy Napes. The track peaked at number 87 in the UK Singles Chart. It features vocals from Howard rather than a guest vocalist.

== Track listing ==
- Digital download
1. "Jaded" – 4:35
- Digital download – The Remixes
1. "Jaded" (Lone remix) – 5:07
2. "Jaded" (Hermitude remix) – 3:47
3. "Jaded" (Dense & Pika remix) – 6:31
4. "Jaded" (Jammer remix) – 3:45
5. "Jaded" (Kerri Chandler Kaoz 623 dub) – 6:25

== Charts ==
Chart (2015)	Peak position
Belgium (Ultratip Bubbling Under Flanders)	8
UK Dance (OCC)	23
UK Singles (OCC)	87

== Release history ==
Region	Date	Format
Worldwide	1 August 2015	Digital download

== See also ==
- List of number-one dance singles of 2015 (U.S.)
