= Caracal (album) =

Studio album by Disclosure
- Released: 25 September 2015
- Genre: Dance
- Length: 52:22
- Labels: PMR; Island
- Producer: Disclosure

Disclosure chronology
| Settle: The Remixes (2013) | Caracal (2015) | Caracal: Live BBC Session (2015) |

Singles from Caracal
- 1. "Holding On" Released: 26 May 2015; 2. "Omen" Released: 27 July 2015; 3. "Jaded" Released: 1 August 2015; 4. "Magnets" Released: 23 September 2015; 5. "Nocturnal" Released: 16 February 2016

Caracal is the second studio album by English electronic music duo Disclosure. It was released on 25 September 2015 by PMR Records and Island Records, and serves as a follow-up to their debut album, Settle (2013). Five official singles were released from the album: "Holding On", "Omen", "Jaded", "Magnets" and "Nocturnal", with three promotional singles also being released: "Bang That", "Willing and Able" and "Hourglass".

Caracal was nominated for Best Dance/Electronic Album at the 2016 Grammy Awards.

== Singles ==
"Holding On" featuring American jazz musician Gregory Porter, was released as the album's lead single on 26 May 2015. The song peaked at number 46 in the UK Singles Chart.

The duo released "Omen" featuring English singer Sam Smith, as the second single on 27 July 2015, which later peaked at number 13 in the UK. Smith has also worked with Disclosure in the past, contributing vocals to duo's hit single "Latch", which peaked at number 11 in the UK and number seven in the Billboard Hot 100.

"Jaded" was released as the third single on 1 August 2015. The song peaked at number 87 in the UK.

"Magnets" featuring New Zealand singer Lorde, was released as the fourth single on 23 September 2015.

"Nocturnal" featuring The Weeknd, was released as the album's fifth single on 16 February 2016.

=== Promotional singles ===
"Bang That" was released as a promotional single on 1 May 2015. On 13 August 2015, "Willing and Able" featuring British singer Kwabs, was released as the second promotional single. On 10 September 2015, "Hourglass" featuring American soul duo Lion Babe, was released as the third and final promotional single. It peaked in French charts (SNEP) at number 148 and in UK Singles (OCC) at number 80.

== Critical reception ==
Professional ratings
Aggregate scores
| Source | Rating |
|---|---|
| AnyDecentMusic? | 6.5/10 |
| Metacritic | 73/100 |
Review scores
| Source | Rating |
| AllMusic | 4/5 stars |
| The A.V. Club | A− |
| Billboard | 3/5 stars |
| Mixmag | 8/10 |
| NME | 4/5 stars |
| Pitchfork | 6.6/10 |
| PopMatters | 7/10 |
| Rolling Stone | 3.5/5 stars |
| Slant Magazine | 3.5/5 stars |
| Spin | 7/10 |

Caracal was met with generally positive reviews. At Metacritic, which assigns a normalised rating out of 100 to reviews from mainstream publications, the album received an average score of 73, based on 24 reviews. Aggregator AnyDecentMusic? gave it 6.5 out of 10, based on their assessment of the critical consensus.

Andy Kellman of AllMusic said, "Although the tracks rarely surprise, frequently falling back on familiar sounds and structures — loping basslines and synthesizer shadings that escalate at the same tempo always arrive on time, for instance—they're as well-built as those of the debut, and the Lawrences, along with their songwriting partners, cover the ups and downs of falling in and out of love in sharper fashion". Lily Moayeri of The A.V. Club said, "With even more glossy production than Settle, Caracal is high-quality Top 40 material". Sasha Geffen of Consequence said, "Disclosure has found the perfect center of the Venn diagram of house music and mainstream pop. This is music you can play at the club and play for your mom; it won't take you anywhere you haven't been before, but damn if you won't have fun getting there anyway".

Ralph Moore of Mixmag said, "Big and bold with smart production touches and melodies to match, this is an album destined for stadiums". Colin Fitzgerald of PopMatters said, "Caracal offers the same slick production value and luxury grooves that made Settle a crossover phenomenon, so even if you don't find yourself enamored with the more narrow direction Disclosure have taken their finely crafted sound, you still might find yourself dancing along". Leonie Cooper of NME said, "Caracal is about Disclosure maturing, moving on and showing the listener how to rave respectably. This is dance music for grown-ups". Will Hermes of Rolling Stone said, "When the singers serve the grooves, the Lawrence brothers reassert their standing as the 21st century's great house ambassadors". Eric Henderson of Slant Magazine said, "If Settle was the thunderstorm, Caracal is the unmistakable scent left in the air afterward". Harley Brown of Spin said, "These are heftier tracks that, because of their added weight, move slower; and like any collection of thematically linked subwoofer-challenging, chart-charting songs, some feel a little Skyped-in—or at least tailored a little too much to their guiding spotlights".

Michaelangelo Matos of Billboard said, "Caracal is the kind of effort that diehard fans might convince themselves to appreciate, and then never play again". Lee Adcock of Drowned in Sound said, "The Lawrence bros do pull some new tricks on Caracal. But the album marks the end of Disclosure as a band, and the beginning of Disclosure as a hit-dispensing enterprise that manufactures durable, no-stain, easy-to-clean products to please every audience". Benjamin Boles of Now said, "Caracal is consistently good but also feels manicured and safe". Michael Cragg of The Observer said, "Thankfully the big-name guests step up to the plate, specifically Miguel on the hazy 'Good Intentions'; the Weeknd, who continues his pop trajectory on 'Nocturnal'; and Lorde, who slinks playfully around 'Magnets'' subtle electro shuffle. Overall, however, Caracal is an early sign a shake-up may be needed". In a mixed review, Meaghan Garvey from Pitchfork said of the album, "the Lawrence brothers too often fade noncommittally into white noise".

=== Rankings ===
Year-end lists for Caracal
| Publication | Accolade | Rank | Ref. |
|---|---|---|---|
| Mixmag | Mixmag's Top 50 Albums of 2015 | 25 | |
| Noisey | Noisey's 50 Best Albums of 2015 | 34 | |
| Slant Magazine | Slant Magazine's 25 Best Albums of 2015 | 25 | |

=== Industry awards ===
Awards and nominations for Caracal
| Year | Ceremony | Category | Result | Ref. |
|---|---|---|---|---|
| 2016 | Grammy Awards | Best Dance/Electronic Album | Nominated | |

== Track listing ==
Caracal track listing
| No. | Title | Writer(s) | Length |
|---|---|---|---|
| 1. | "Nocturnal" (featuring The Weeknd) | Howard Lawrence; Guy Lawrence; James Napier; Abel Tesfaye | 6:44 |
| 2. | "Omen" (featuring Sam Smith) | H. Lawrence; G. Lawrence; Napier; Smith | 3:50 |
| 3. | "Holding On" (featuring Gregory Porter) | H. Lawrence; G. Lawrence; Napier; Porter | 5:15 |
| 4. | "Hourglass" (featuring Lion Babe) | H. Lawrence; G. Lawrence; Napier; Jillian Hervey | 5:24 |
| 5. | "Willing and Able" (featuring Kwabs) | H. Lawrence; G. Lawrence; Napier; Kwabena Adjepong; Finlay Robson | 4:52 |
| 6. | "Magnets" (featuring Lorde) | H. Lawrence; G. Lawrence; Napier; Ella Yelich-O'Connor | 3:19 |
| 7. | "Jaded" | H. Lawrence; G. Lawrence; Napier; Sam Romans | 4:33 |
| 8. | "Good Intentions" (featuring Miguel) | H. Lawrence; G. Lawrence; Napier; Miguel Pimentel | 4:42 |
| 9. | "Superego" (featuring Nao) | H. Lawrence; G. Lawrence; Napier; Neo Jessica Joshua | 4:33 |
| 10. | "Echoes" | H. Lawrence; G. Lawrence; Napier | 5:09 |
| 11. | "Masterpiece" (featuring Jordan Rakei) | H. Lawrence; G. Lawrence; Napier; Rakei | 4:01 |
| Total length: | | | 52:22 |

Deluxe edition (bonus tracks)
| No. | Title | Writer(s) | Length |
|---|---|---|---|
| 12. | "Molecules" | H. Lawrence; G. Lawrence; Napier | 3:56 |
| 13. | "Moving Mountains" (featuring Brendan Reilly) | H. Lawrence; G. Lawrence; Napier; Reilly | 5:35 |
| 14. | "Afterthought" | H. Lawrence; G. Lawrence; Napier | 5:20 |
| Total length: | | | 67:13 |

iTunes deluxe edition (bonus tracks)
| No. | Title | Writer(s) | Length |
|---|---|---|---|
| 12. | "Molecules" | H. Lawrence; G. Lawrence; Napier | 3:56 |
| 13. | "Moving Mountains" (featuring Brendan Reilly) | H. Lawrence; G. Lawrence; Napier; Reilly | 5:35 |
| 14. | "Bang That" | H. Lawrence; G. Lawrence; Julian Shamou | 4:48 |
| 15. | "Afterthought" | H. Lawrence; G. Lawrence; Napier | 5:20 |
| Total length: | | | 72:01 |

Japanese edition (bonus tracks)
| No. | Title | Writer(s) | Length |
|---|---|---|---|
| 12. | "Molecules" | H. Lawrence; G. Lawrence; Napier | 3:56 |
| 13. | "Moving Mountains" (featuring Brendan Reilly) | H. Lawrence; G. Lawrence; Napier; Reilly | 5:35 |
| 14. | "Bang That" | H. Lawrence; G. Lawrence; Julian Shamou | 4:48 |
| 15. | "Afterthought" | H. Lawrence; G. Lawrence; Napier | 5:20 |
| 16. | "Omen" (Jonas Rathsman remix; featuring Sam Smith) | H. Lawrence; G. Lawrence; Napier; Smith | 8:32 |
| Total length: | | | 80:33 |

Target exclusive (bonus tracks)
| No. | Title | Writer(s) | Length |
|---|---|---|---|
| 12. | "Molecules" | H. Lawrence; G. Lawrence; Napier | 3:56 |
| 13. | "Moving Mountains" (featuring Brendan Reilly) | H. Lawrence; G. Lawrence; Napier; Reilly | 5:35 |
| 14. | "Afterthought" | H. Lawrence; G. Lawrence; Napier | 5:20 |
| 15. | "Holding On" (original demo; featuring Gregory Porter) | H. Lawrence; G. Lawrence; Napier; Porter | 3:00 |
| 16. | "Bang That" (Kevin & Dantiez Saunderson Bangit Detroit remix) | H. Lawrence; G. Lawrence; Shamou | 6:41 |

Caracal (Live BBC Session) (EP)
| No. | Title | Length |
|---|---|---|
| 1. | "Omen" (featuring Sam Smith; live from Maida Vale) | 4:15 |
| 2. | "Hotline Bling" (featuring Sam Smith; live from Maida Vale) | 3:45 |
| 3. | "Jaded" (live from Maida Vale) | 4:05 |
| 4. | "Moving Mountains" (featuring Brendan Reilly; live from Maida Vale) | 5:39 |

== Charts ==
=== Weekly charts ===
Weekly chart performance for Caracal
| Chart (2015) | Peak position |
|---|---|
| Australian Albums (ARIA) | 2 |
| Austrian Albums (Ö3 Austria) | 31 |
| Belgian Albums (Ultratop Flanders) | 6 |
| Belgian Albums (Ultratop Wallonia) | 14 |
| Canadian Albums (Billboard) | 9 |
| Croatian International Albums (HDU) | 39 |
| Czech Albums (ČNS IFPI) | 84 |
| Danish Albums (Hitlisten) | 9 |
| Dutch Albums (Album Top 100) | 7 |
| French Albums (SNEP) | 28 |
| German Albums (Offizielle Top 100) | 31 |
| Greek Albums (IFPI) | 55 |
| Irish Albums (IRMA) | 3 |
| Italian Albums (FIMI) | 17 |
| Japanese Albums (Oricon) | 54 |
| New Zealand Albums (RMNZ) | 3 |
| Norwegian Albums (VG-lista) | 16 |
| Polish Albums (ZPAV) | 44 |
| Portuguese Albums (AFP) | 10 |
| Scottish Albums (Official Charts) | 4 |
| South Korean Albums (Gaon) | 72 |
| Spanish Albums (Promusicae) | 62 |
| Swedish Albums (Sverigetopplistan) | 32 |
| Swiss Albums (Schweizer Hitparade) | 14 |
| UK Albums (Official Charts) | 1 |
| UK Dance Albums (Official Charts) | 1 |
| US Billboard 200 | 9 |
| US Top Dance Albums (Billboard) | 1 |

=== Year-end charts ===
2015 year-end chart performance for Caracal
| Chart (2015) | Position |
|---|---|
| US Dance/Electronic Albums (Billboard) | 13 |

2016 year-end chart performance for Caracal
| Chart (2016) | Position |
|---|---|
| US Dance/Electronic Albums (Billboard) | 9 |

== Certifications ==
Certifications for Caracal
| Region | Certification | Certified units/sales |
|---|---|---|
| Mexico (AMPROFON) | Gold | 30,000^{^} |
| United Kingdom (BPI) | Gold | 100,000^{‡} |
^{^} Shipments figures based on certification alone.^{‡} Sales+streaming figures based on certification alone.
