= Magnets (song) =

2015 single by Disclosure

Single by Disclosure featuring Lorde

from the album Caracal
- Released: 23 September 2015
- Recorded: 2015
- Genre: Electronica; dancehall
- Length: 3:19
- Label: PMR; Island
- Songwriters: Ella Yelich-O'Connor; Guy Lawrence; Howard Lawrence; James Napier
- Producer: Disclosure

Disclosure singles chronology
"Jaded" (2015)	"Magnets" (2015)	"Nocturnal" (2016)

Lorde singles chronology
"Yellow Flicker Beat" (2014)	"Magnets" (2015)	"Green Light" (2017)

Music video
- "Magnets" on YouTube

"Magnets" is a song by British electronic duo Disclosure featuring vocals from New Zealand singer-songwriter Lorde. It was written by Howard Lawrence, Guy Lawrence, Lorde and produced by James Napier and Disclosure. The single was released on 23 September 2015, by PMR and Island Records, as the fourth single from their second studio album Caracal (2015). "Magnets" is an electronica and dancehall song with influences of reggae fusion along with electronic beats, percussion loops, synthesizers and tribal drums in its instrumentation. Its lyrics describe the risk taken by two lovers restricted from being together for moral reasons.

"Magnets" was well received by music critics with many praising its production and Lorde's vocal delivery. Rolling Stone included the song in its year-end list. An accompanying music video was directed by Ryan Hope and was released on 29 September 2015. Critics praised its dark story line and visuals. The track became Disclosure's most successful hit in Australia and New Zealand, peaking at number 14 and number two respectively, becoming their highest-charting single on both countries. In the United States, "Magnets" became their first single to impact alternative and adult alternative radio, placing at number 21 on the Rock Airplay chart and number 13 on the Alternative Songs chart.

== Background and recording ==
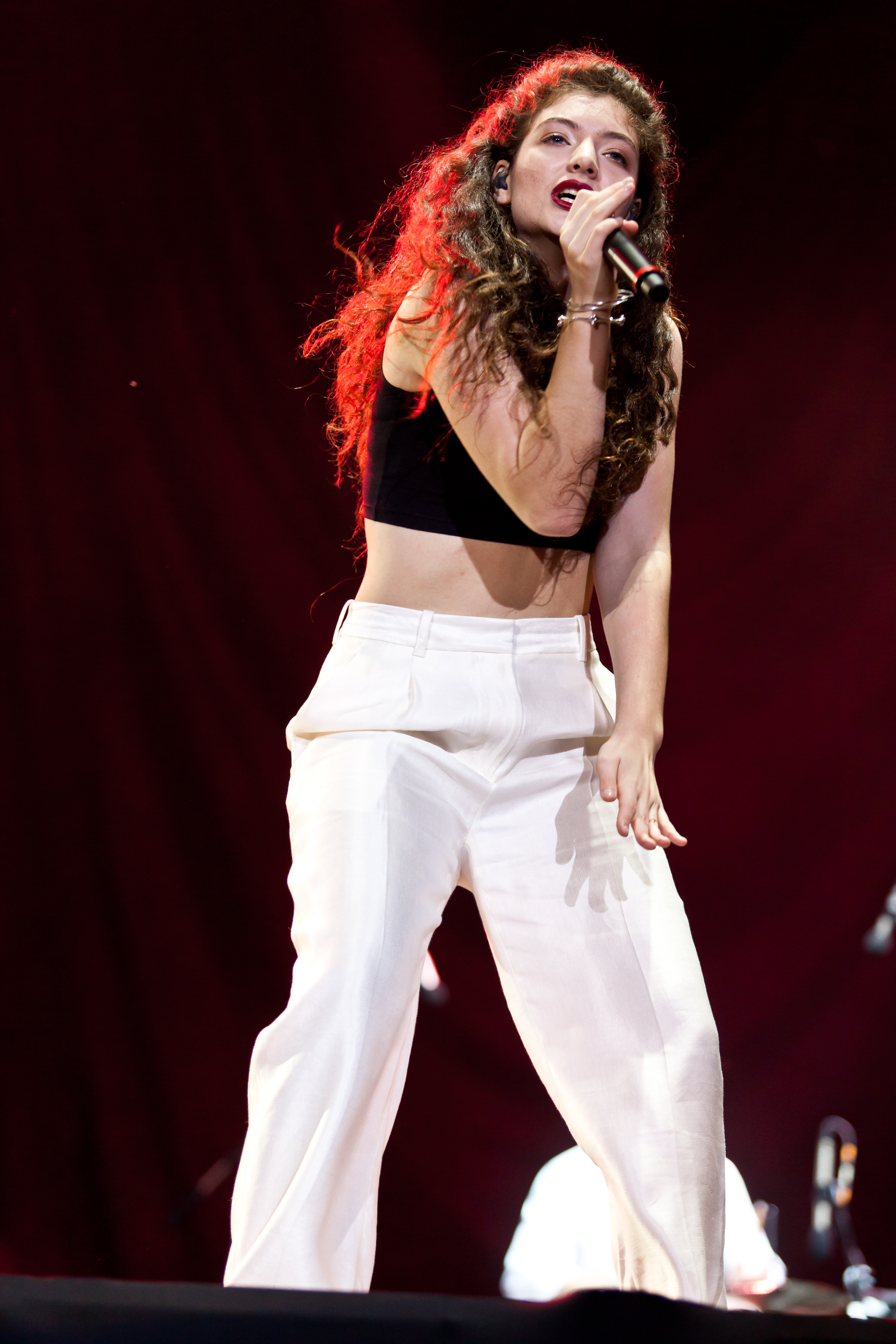
Lorde co-wrote and was featured on "Magnets" (pictured in 2014).

Disclosure and New Zealand singer Lorde first collaborated on a mash-up of "Royals" (2013) and "White Noise" (2013) at the 2014 Brit Awards. The duo received a call from Lorde in London who wanted to get in the studio shortly after they finished the record. They stated that the singer showed up without management or bodyguards by her side which they called the "most equal collaboration on the record." Her sound was described as "sassy yet vulnerable". A year later, Lorde posted a picture on Instagram on 10 June 2015 with Disclosure getting milkshakes. The duo wanted to keep the collaboration a secret since they wanted it to be a surprise. The singer later tweeted a line from the song's pre-chorus 31 July 2015.

During the recording process, Howard Lawrence stated to Entertainment Weekly that he asks his collaborators, "Has anything interesting happened to you?" to gather ideas for a song. Howard then said he had an idea about using the phrase "the point of no return" which was originally going to be the title of the song. He commented on the ambiguity of the phrase, noting that it could be used in flying, boating, etc. Lorde came up with the idea of using the phrase from the perspective of an individual being attracted to a person they should not be for "moral reasons". Once that individual tells them, they have "gone past the point of no return". Guy Lawrence later described it as someone going so far they cannot get home with the amount of fuel that they have.

== Composition ==
"Magnets" is described as an atmospheric dancehall and electronica song with influences of reggae fusion along electronic beats, percussion loops, synthesizers, and tribal drums in its instrumentation. "Magnets" describes the dilemma between two lovers restricted from being together for moral reasons. Digital Spy described the lyrics as "delightfully cryptic," while Vice described them as taking "a sense of risk and reckless abandon."

Disclosure teased the song in an interview with Spin, who described the writing process as a proper collaboration, from the "drum sounds to the chords". They stated that Lorde was involved with "every aspect of the song" as opposed to doing the "lyrics and melodies" and then leaving the rest for the duo to finish. Disclosure also said that the singer challenged them. The duo was very well-receptive towards the song's simplicity which they say is simply a use of "tribal drums" throughout. It is the shortest song on the album. A snippet of the track was teased on 13 September 2015.

== Critical reception ==
"Magnets" garnered mostly positive reviews from music critics with many praising the song's production and Lorde's vocal delivery. Rolling Stone called the song "seductive" while Spin called it a "cool, upbeat yet gloomy collaboration." Pretty Much Amazing writer Austin Reed said the song could serve as a "pop music blueprint" and praised its "light and whimsical." Reed also described it as a song with "hyper-polished production, catchy hooks and a bounce-around chorus only Lorde could conceive." Sharing similar opinions, Consequence of Sound called the duo and Lorde's musical chemistry as "stronger than ever" and praised the singer's "soulful vocals". Cleveland called "Magnets" the most surprising and referred to Lorde as the best guest-spot on the album.

The A.V. Club praised Lorde's "signature catch-in-throat voice teases and taunts on the [song's] hiccuped rhythms," while The Guardian highlighted the singer's slinky playfulness on the track. NME noted that Disclosure took a "more thoughtful and considered approach" and compared the track to Lorde's 2013 song "Tennis Court". The Chicago Tribune lauded the song's "infectious refrain" and complimented how well both artists styles blended, while Clash criticized the singer for sounded dreary on the lackluster song. Sharing similar sentiments, The Guardian stated that while Lorde provides "spidery vocals", the singer "sounds aloof to the point of boredom." Rolling Stone ranked "Magnets" at number 32 on its year-end list to find the 50 best songs of 2015, calling it "the year's most understated dance-world magic". Slant ranked the track at number 84 on their list of the 100 best singles of the 2010s decade. Conversely, Michaelangelo Matos of Billboard called the tune "mildly memorable".

== Commercial performance ==
In the United States, "Magnets" became Disclosure's first single to impact alternative radio and adult alternative radio. It debuted at number 41 on the Rock Airplay chart with 1.2 million audience impressions on the week dated 24 October and peaked at number 13 on the Alternative Songs chart, with the single being officially released to alternative radio on 10 November 2015. "Magnets" was one of several songs to crossover to rock airplay without rock-focused guests, including Avicii's "Wake Me Up" (2013) and Daft Punk's "Get Lucky" (2013). The track became Disclosure's most successful hit in Australia and New Zealand, peaking at number 14 and number two respectively, becoming their highest-charting single on both countries. "Magnets" was voted in at number 10 in Australian alternative youth radio station Triple J's Hottest 100 countdown of 2015's most popular songs, announced on 26 January 2016.

== Music video ==
In this scene, an unnamed actress appears in a gloomy scene with a black eye, alluding to domestic abuse. Critics initially thought the video was about Lorde's affair with a married man, until the singer explained the video's storyline.

The music video was directed by Ryan Hope, and was released on 29 September 2015. It was filmed in Hollywood Hills, California. Lorde commented that she had a strong desire to play a hit-woman who seduced unfaithful men. The stylist of the video, Karla Welsh stated that she and Lorde wanted to explore how "sexy a covered-up look could seem." Some of the outfits used included latex Dior boots, a Rona Pfeiffer arresting swallow necklace, and a cream gown from Michael Costello. Nicaraguan human rights activist Bianca Jagger was one of the style inspirations. Welsh explained that the corset "represented that she still had this armor around herself."

The video starts with a still of Lorde next to a pool dressed in a white gown, viewing from the top of a mountain. Two moons in purple appear while two helicopters vigilate the area. She then makes her way to a party as the camera pans on a married couple talking to other guests. The husband, played by British actor Iddo Goldberg, turns into Lorde's view, attracted by her. The following day, Goldberg and Lorde engage in a passionate makeout session before she pushes him away as the scene splices with one where his wife enters. Displaying a mood change, she serves him a cup of coffee as she adjusts his tie. That following evening, Lorde and Goldberg meet up as they kiss profusely. The camera then pans away as his wife turns around from a window and displays signs of domestic abuse from a black eye. Lorde, dressed in a latex black outfit then arrives with his wife, as he is tied to a chair. It is revealed that Lorde was hired by his wife to be a hit-woman. The video ends with Lorde pushing the man into the pool and setting him ablaze.

Critics described the video as a mature direction from the singer's previous works. Its visuals and storyline were praised; the style of Lorde's femme fatale character received comparisons to Trinity from The Matrix film series (1999–) and the White Witch from The Chronicles of Narnia (2005–2010). Consequence of Sound noted that while the Lawrence brothers are not seen in the video, Lorde "carries the clip masterfully on her own." In an analysis from The Atlantic, writer Spencer Kornhaber stated that the music video was part of a trend of women performing acts of violence towards other people. Slant ranked the visual at number 100 on their list of the Best Music Videos of the 2010s, while Vice placed it in their list of the 12 Beautiful Music Videos About Women Murdering Men.

== Live performances ==
Disclosure and Lorde performed the song on Saturday Night Live on 14 November 2015, which was followed by a performance of "Omen" (2015) with Sam Smith and the duo only. Rolling Stone stated that the "drumline-enhanced performance also featured a brief tribute to Paris," who experienced a terrorist attack the prior day. The stage was lit up in the "bleu, blanc et rouge" (English: blue, white and red) of the French flag. The Fader stated that the performance benefited from the "extra musicians, with the sampled hits being supplemented by live marching drums." Idolator described Lorde's look as being an all-black dress with a "shorter haircut and blood-red eyeshadow" which fully embraced the "vengeful and sultry vibe found" in the video and song. The performance sparked controversy over the singer's alleged lip syncing. Lorde later responded to the accusations by saying that she has not and will never lip sync and took the allegations as an "awesome compliment." She also joined the duo for a surprise performance at the 2016 Coachella festival.

== Track listing ==
Digital download
No.	Title	Length
1.	"Magnets" (featuring Lorde)	3:19

Digital download — Magnets (The Remixes)
No.	Title	Length
1.	"Magnets" (Disclosure V.I.P.)	6:16
2.	"Magnets" (A-Trak Remix)	4:20
3.	"Magnets" (Loco Dice Remix)	6:56
4.	"Magnets" (Tiga Remix)	4:34
5.	"Magnets" (SG Lewis Remix)	4:46
6.	"Magnets" (Jon Hopkins Remix)	6:55

== Credits and personnel ==
Credits adapted from the liner notes of Caracal and Tidal.

Recording and management

- Mastered at Sterling Sound Studios (New York, New York)
- Published by Salli Isaak Songs (SESAC), Universal Music Publishing (UMPG), Songs Music Publishing (ASCAP)
- Lorde appears courtesy of Universal Music New Zealand

Personnel

- Howard Lawrence – production, songwriting, mixing
- Guy Lawrence – production, songwriting, mixing
- Ella Yelich-O'Connor – lead vocals, featured artist, songwriting
- James Napier – songwriting
- Tom Coyne – mastering engineer
- Gus Pirelli – engineering

== Charts ==
=== Weekly charts ===
Chart (2015–2016)	Peak position
Australia (ARIA)	14
Belgium (Ultratop 50 Flanders)	36
Canada Hot 100 (Billboard)	58
Czech Republic Airplay (ČNS IFPI)	50
Czech Republic Singles Digital (ČNS IFPI)	74
France (SNEP)	87
Ireland (IRMA)	64
Netherlands (Single Top 100)	74
New Zealand (Recorded Music NZ)	2
New Zealand Digital Songs (Billboard)	1
Portugal (AFP)	90
Scottish Singles Sales (Official Charts)	63
Slovakia Singles Digital (ČNS IFPI)	49
UK Singles (Official Charts)	71
UK Dance (Official Charts)	20
US Bubbling Under Hot 100 (Billboard)	2
US Alternative Airplay (Billboard)	13
US Dance Club Songs (Billboard)	1
US Hot Dance/Electronic Songs (Billboard)	8
US Rock & Alternative Airplay (Billboard)	21

=== Year end charts ===
Chart (2015)	Position
US Hot Dance/Electronic Songs (Billboard)	48

Chart (2016)	Position
US Dance Club Songs (Billboard)	33
US Hot Dance/Electronic Songs (Billboard)	29

== Certifications ==
Region	Certification	Certified units/sales
Australia (ARIA)	3× Platinum	210,000^{‡}
Brazil (Pro-Música Brasil)	Platinum	60,000^{‡}
New Zealand (RMNZ)	2× Platinum	60,000^{‡}
United Kingdom (BPI)	Silver	200,000^{‡}
^{‡} Sales+streaming figures based on certification alone.

== Release history ==
Region	Date	Format	Label	Ref.
Various (Note: Released as a promotional single.)	23 September 2015	Digital download	PMR; Island	
United States	10 November 2015	Alternative radio	Capitol	
United States	16 November 2015	Digital download	PMR; Island	
United States	24 November 2015	Dance radio	Capitol	
Italy	4 December 2015	Contemporary hit radio	Universal	

== See also ==
- List of number-one dance singles of 2016 (U.S.)
