= Love + War (Kwabs album) =

Studio album by Kwabs
- Released: 11 September 2015
- Recorded: 2014–15
- Genre: Soul; R&B; pop
- Length: 45:56
- Label: Atlantic
- Producer: Kwabs; Cass Lowe; Mark Ralph; Al Shux; Starsmith; TMS; SOHN; Felix Joseph; Dave Okumu; Sam Romans; Craze and Hoax

Kwabs chronology
Walk EP (2014)	Love + War (2015)

Singles from Love + War
- 1. "Wrong or Right" Released: 3 February 2014; 2. "Walk" Released: 29 September 2014; 3. "Fight for Love" Released: 28 June 2015; 4. "Cheating on Me" Released: 4 December 2015

Love + War is the debut studio album by British singer Kwabs. It was released on 11 September 2015 through Atlantic Records.

== Background ==
In 2013, Kwabs signed to Atlantic Records after his cover versions of "Like a Star" by Corinne Bailey Rae and "The Wilhelm Scream" by James Blake went viral on YouTube. In 2014, Kwabs released his debut EP Wrong or Right and was nominated for 'Best Newcomer' at the MOBOs before being shortlisted for the prestigious BBC Sound of 2015 poll.

Kwabs was also nominated as 'Best R&B / Soul' artist at the MOBOs 2015 and for Best Push at the MTV EMAs 2015.

== Singles ==
"Wrong or Right" was the first single from the album and was released on 3 February 2014.

The second single taken from the album was "Walk", released on 29 September 2014. The song was number one in Germany and went Platinum in Norway, as well as Gold in Germany, Austria and Switzerland.

"Fight for Love" was released as the album’s third single on 28 June 2015.

Following the release of the album, "Cheating on Me" was released on 4 December 2015 as the fourth single.

== Critical reception ==
The album received positive reviews. In a strong review, The Independent rated the album five out of five stars, calling it a "stunning debut". In another review, The Line of Best Fit gave the album a rating of 9.5/10, describing it as "the best pop music in the U.K. right now".

The album also received multiple favourable reviews from the likes of The Guardian, MTV, Sunday Times Culture, Mojo, Attitude, Time Out and The 405.

== Track listing ==
Love + War track listing
No.	Title	Writer(s)	Producer(s)	Length
1.	"Love + War"	Kwabs; Cass Lowe	Kwabs; Cass Lowe; Mark Ralph (add.)	4:13
2.	"Fight for Love"	Kwabs; Francis White; Justin Parker	Starsmith; Al Shux; Kwabs (vocal)	3:38
3.	"Walk"	Kwabs; Jonny Lattimer	TMS	3:34
4.	"My Own"	Kwabs; Christopher Taylor	Sohn	3:49
5.	"Look Over Your Shoulder"	Kwabs; Christopher Taylor	Sohn	3:02
6.	"Perfect Ruin"	Kwabs; Royce Wood Junior; George Moore	Felix Joseph	4:12
7.	"Forgiven"	Kwabs; Tom Havelock; Ben Kohn; Pete Kelleher; Tom Barnes	TMS	3:52
8.	"Layback"	Kwabs; George Moore	Dave Okumu	3:55
9.	"Make You Mine"	Kwabs; Cass Lowe	Cass Lowe	3:44
10.	"Father Figure"	Kwabs; Sam Romans; Joan Armatrading	Sam Romans; Craze and Hoax (add.)	3:20
11.	"Wrong or Right"	Kwabs; Christopher Taylor	Sohn	3:36
12.	"Cheating on Me"	Kwabs; Jimmy Napes	Felix Joseph	5:01

== Charts ==
Chart performance for Love + War
Chart (2015)	Peak position
Austrian Albums (Ö3 Austria)	44
Belgian Albums (Ultratop Flanders)	39
Belgian Albums (Ultratop Wallonia)	165
Dutch Albums (Album Top 100)	23
German Albums (Offizielle Top 100)	26
Hungarian Albums (MAHASZ)	24
Scottish Albums (OCC)	58
Swiss Albums (Schweizer Hitparade)	12
UK Albums (OCC)	26
