= Holding On (Disclosure song) =

Single by Disclosure featuring Gregory Porter

from the album Caracal
- Released: 26 May 2015
- Genre: Deep house; UK garage; breakbeat
- Length: 5:15
- Label: PMR; Island
- Songwriters: Howard Lawrence; Guy Lawrence; James Napier; Gregory Porter
- Producer: Disclosure

Disclosure singles chronology
"The Mechanism" (2014)	"Holding On" (2015)	"Omen" (2015)

Gregory Porter singles chronology
"The 'In' Crowd" (2014)	"Holding On" (2015)	"Hey Laura" (2015)

Music video
- "Disclosure – Holding On ft. Gregory Porter" on YouTube

"Holding On" is a song by British electronic music duo Disclosure. It features vocals from Gregory Porter. It was released worldwide on 26 May 2015 as the lead single from the duo's second studio album, Caracal. The track premiered on 26 May 2015 as BBC Radio 1 DJ Annie Mac's Hottest Record in the World. The track was written by Howard Lawrence, Porter and Jimmy Napes. The track peaked at number 13 in the UK iTunes chart but only managed to reach number 46 in the UK Singles Chart.

== Track listing ==
- Digital download
1. "Holding On" (featuring Gregory Porter) – 5:15
- Digital download – The Remixes and 12" remix EP
1. "Holding On" (Julio Bashmore Elevated mix) – 6:33
2. "Holding On" (Pomo remix) – 3:28
3. "Holding On" (Melé remix) – 4:54
4. "Holding On" (Armand Van Helden dub mix) – 4:58
5. "Holding On" (Gus Pirelli VIP 7" disco mix) – 3:12

== Charts ==
=== Weekly charts ===
Chart (2015)	Peak position
Australia (ARIA)	77
Belgium (Ultratip Bubbling Under Flanders)	13
Belgium (Ultratip Bubbling Under Wallonia)	37
France (SNEP)	50
Netherlands (Single Top 100)	69
Poland Dance (ZPAV)	41
UK Dance (Official Charts)	9
UK Singles (Official Charts)	46
US Hot Dance/Electronic Songs (Billboard)	18
US Dance Club Songs (Billboard)	1

=== Year-end charts ===
Chart (2015)	Position
US Dance Club Songs (Billboard)	2
US Hot Dance/Electronic Songs (Billboard)	51

== Release history ==
Region	Date	Format
Worldwide	26 May 2015	Digital download

== See also ==
- List of number-one dance singles of 2015 (U.S.)
