= List of Billboard number-one dance songs of 2015 =

Billboard magazine compiled the top-performing dance songs in the United States during 2015 on the Hot Dance/Electronic Songs, the Dance Club Songs, and the Dance/Mix Show Airplay. The oldest dance music chart, the Dance Club Songs was first published in 1976, ranking the most popular songs on dance club based on reports from a national sample of club DJs. The Dance/Mix Show Airplay was launched in 2003, ranking songs based on airplay detections on dance radio, as well as mix-show plays on top 40 radio and select rhythmic radio as measured by Mediabase. Premiered on January 26, 2013, the Hot Dance/Electronic Songs is a multi-metric chart ranking songs based on streaming, sales, and airplay audience impressions from radio stations of all formats.

== Chart history ==
Key
†	Indicates top-performing song of 2015.

Chart history
Issue date	Hot Dance/Electronic Songs			Dance Club Songs			Dance/Mix Show Airplay		
Issue date	Song	Artist(s)	Ref.	Song	Artist(s)	Ref.	Song	Artist(s)	Ref.
January 3	"Waves"	Mr. Probz		"Rolling in the Deep (The Aretha Version)"	Aretha Franklin		"Heroes (We Could Be)"	Alesso featuring Tove Lo	
January 10	"Waves"	Mr. Probz		"Jealous"	Nick Jonas		"Heroes (We Could Be)"	Alesso featuring Tove Lo	
January 17	"Waves"	Mr. Probz		"Big Fun"	D.O.N.S. and Terri B!		"Love Me Harder"	Ariana Grande and The Weeknd	
January 24	"Waves"	Mr. Probz		"Go All Night"	Gorgon City featuring Jennifer Hudson		"Love Me Harder"	Ariana Grande and The Weeknd	
January 31	"Waves"	Mr. Probz		"Uptown Funk"	Mark Ronson featuring Bruno Mars		"Love Me Harder"	Ariana Grande and The Weeknd	
February 7	"Waves"	Mr. Probz		"Blind Heart"	Cazzette featuring Terri B!		"Uptown Funk"	Mark Ronson featuring Bruno Mars	
February 14	"Prayer in C"	Lilly Wood and the Prick and Robin Schulz		"7/11"	Beyoncé		"Uptown Funk"	Mark Ronson featuring Bruno Mars	
February 21	"Prayer in C"	Lilly Wood and the Prick and Robin Schulz		"All of You"	Betty Who		"Prayer in C"	LillyWood & Robin Schulz	
February 28	"Prayer in C"	Lilly Wood and the Prick and Robin Schulz		"Right Now"	Mary J. Blige		"Uptown Funk"	Mark Ronson featuring Bruno Mars	
March 7	"Prayer in C"	Lilly Wood and the Prick and Robin Schulz		"Living for Love"	Madonna		"Outside"	Calvin Harris featuring Ellie Goulding	
March 14	"I Want You to Know"	Zedd featuring Selena Gomez		"Time of Our Lives"	Pitbull and Ne-Yo		"Outside"	Calvin Harris featuring Ellie Goulding	
March 21	"Prayer in C"	Lilly Wood and the Prick and Robin Schulz		"Something New"†	Axwell and Ingrosso		"Outside"	Calvin Harris featuring Ellie Goulding	
March 28	"I Want You to Know"	Zedd featuring Selena Gomez		"I'm Gonna Get You"	Dave Audé featuring Jessica Sutta		"Outside"	Calvin Harris featuring Ellie Goulding	
April 4	"I Want You to Know"	Zedd featuring Selena Gomez		"Elastic Heart"	Sia		"Outside"	Calvin Harris featuring Ellie Goulding	
April 11	"I Want You to Know"	Zedd featuring Selena Gomez		"Crazy"	Erika Jayne featuring Maino		"Outside"	Calvin Harris featuring Ellie Goulding	
April 18	"I Want You to Know"	Zedd featuring Selena Gomez		"Right Here, Right Now"	Giorgio Moroder featuring Kylie Minogue		"Love Me Like You Do"	Ellie Goulding	
April 25	"I Want You to Know"	Zedd featuring Selena Gomez		"Talking Body"	Tove Lo		"Love Me Like You Do"	Ellie Goulding	
May 2	"Hey Mama"	David Guetta featuring Nicki Minaj, Bebe Rexha and Afrojack		"Free People"	Tony Moran featuring Martha Wash		"Love Me Like You Do"	Ellie Goulding	
May 9	"Hey Mama"	David Guetta featuring Nicki Minaj, Bebe Rexha and Afrojack		"Heartbeat Song"	Kelly Clarkson		"Love Me Like You Do"	Ellie Goulding	
May 16	"Hey Mama"	David Guetta featuring Nicki Minaj, Bebe Rexha and Afrojack		"One Hot Mess"	Malea		"Love Me Like You Do"	Ellie Goulding	
May 23	"Hey Mama"	David Guetta featuring Nicki Minaj, Bebe Rexha and Afrojack		"Chains"	Nick Jonas		"Love Me Like You Do"	Ellie Goulding	
May 30	"Hey Mama"	David Guetta featuring Nicki Minaj, Bebe Rexha and Afrojack		"Ghosttown"	Madonna		"Love Me Like You Do"	Ellie Goulding	
June 6	"Hey Mama"	David Guetta featuring Nicki Minaj, Bebe Rexha and Afrojack		"The Giver (Reprise)"	Duke Dumont		"Want to Want Me"	Jason Derulo	
June 13	"Hey Mama"	David Guetta featuring Nicki Minaj, Bebe Rexha and Afrojack		"Insomnia"	Audien featuring Parson James		"You Know You Like It"	DJ Snake and AlunaGeorge	
June 20	"Hey Mama"	David Guetta featuring Nicki Minaj, Bebe Rexha and Afrojack		"I'll Be There"	Chic featuring Nile Rodgers		"You Know You Like It"	DJ Snake and AlunaGeorge	
June 27	"Hey Mama"	David Guetta featuring Nicki Minaj, Bebe Rexha and Afrojack		"Bitch Better Have My Money"	Rihanna		"You Know You Like It"	DJ Snake and AlunaGeorge	
July 4	"Hey Mama"	David Guetta featuring Nicki Minaj, Bebe Rexha and Afrojack		"Mr. Put It Down"	Ricky Martin featuring Pitbull		"You Know You Like It"	DJ Snake and AlunaGeorge	
July 11	"Hey Mama"	David Guetta featuring Nicki Minaj, Bebe Rexha and Afrojack		"House on Fire"	Ryan Cabrera		"Lean On"†	Major Lazer and DJ Snake featuring MØ	
July 18	"Where Are Ü Now"	Jack Ü and Justin Bieber		"Pretty Girls"	Britney Spears and Iggy Azalea		"Lean On"†	Major Lazer and DJ Snake featuring MØ	
July 25	"Where Are Ü Now"	Jack Ü and Justin Bieber		"This Feeling"	L'Tric		"Lean On"†	Major Lazer and DJ Snake featuring MØ	
August 1	"Lean On" ‡	Major Lazer & DJ Snake featuring MØ		"Déjà Vu"	Giorgio Moroder featuring Sia		"Lean On"†	Major Lazer and DJ Snake featuring MØ	
August 8	"Lean On" ‡	Major Lazer & DJ Snake featuring MØ		"Honey, I'm Good."	Andy Grammer		"Lean On"†	Major Lazer and DJ Snake featuring MØ	
August 15	"Lean On" ‡	Major Lazer & DJ Snake featuring MØ		"Bitch I'm Madonna"	Madonna featuring Nicki Minaj		"Lean On"†	Major Lazer and DJ Snake featuring MØ	
August 22	"Lean On" ‡	Major Lazer & DJ Snake featuring MØ		"Kiss Me Quick"	Nathan Sykes		"Lean On"†	Major Lazer and DJ Snake featuring MØ	
August 29	"Lean On" ‡	Major Lazer & DJ Snake featuring MØ		"Beautiful Now"	Zedd featuring Jon Bellion		"Lean On"†	Major Lazer and DJ Snake featuring MØ	
September 5	"Lean On" ‡	Major Lazer & DJ Snake featuring MØ		"Holding On"	Disclosure featuring Gregory Porter		"Lean On"†	Major Lazer and DJ Snake featuring MØ	
September 12	"Lean On" ‡	Major Lazer & DJ Snake featuring MØ		"Cool for the Summer"	Demi Lovato		"Lean On"†	Major Lazer and DJ Snake featuring MØ	
September 19	"Lean On" ‡	Major Lazer & DJ Snake featuring MØ		"Emergency"	Icona Pop		"Lean On"†	Major Lazer and DJ Snake featuring MØ	
September 26	"Lean On" ‡	Major Lazer & DJ Snake featuring MØ		"Something Better"	Audien featuring Lady Antebellum		"Lean On"†	Major Lazer and DJ Snake featuring MØ	
October 3	"Lean On" ‡	Major Lazer & DJ Snake featuring MØ		"There Must Be Love"	David Morales and Janice Robinson		"Lean On"†	Major Lazer and DJ Snake featuring MØ	
October 10	"Lean On" ‡	Major Lazer & DJ Snake featuring MØ		"Omen"	Disclosure featuring Sam Smith		"How Deep Is Your Love"	Calvin Harris & Disciples	
October 17	"Lean On" ‡	Major Lazer & DJ Snake featuring MØ		"Feel the Vibe"	Bob Sinclar featuring Dawn Tallman		"How Deep Is Your Love"	Calvin Harris & Disciples	
October 24	"Lean On" ‡	Major Lazer & DJ Snake featuring MØ		"OXO"	Olivia Somerlyn		"How Deep Is Your Love"	Calvin Harris & Disciples	
October 31	"Lean On" ‡	Major Lazer & DJ Snake featuring MØ		"What Do You Mean?"	Justin Bieber		"What Do You Mean?"	Justin Bieber	
November 7	"Lean On" ‡	Major Lazer & DJ Snake featuring MØ		"The Other Boys"	Nervo featuring Kylie Minogue, Jake Shears and Nile Rodgers		"What Do You Mean?"	Justin Bieber	
November 14	"Lean On" ‡	Major Lazer & DJ Snake featuring MØ		"Synergy"	Sted-E, Hybrid Heights and Crystal Waters		"What Do You Mean?"	Justin Bieber	
November 21	"Lean On" ‡	Major Lazer & DJ Snake featuring MØ		"You Have to Believe"	Dave Audé featuring Olivia Newton-John and Chloe Lattanzi		"How Deep Is Your Love"	Calvin Harris & Disciples	
November 28	"Lean On" ‡	Major Lazer & DJ Snake featuring MØ		"Ocean Drive"	Duke Dumont		"What Do You Mean?"	Justin Bieber	
December 5	"Lean On" ‡	Major Lazer & DJ Snake featuring MØ		"Insomnia 2.0"	Faithless		"Wildest Dreams"	Taylor Swift	
December 12	"Lean On" ‡	Major Lazer & DJ Snake featuring MØ		"Levels"	Nick Jonas		"Hello"	Adele	
December 19	"Lean On" ‡	Major Lazer & DJ Snake featuring MØ		"Confident"	Demi Lovato		"Hello"	Adele	
December 26	"Lean On" ‡	Major Lazer & DJ Snake featuring MØ		"Hello"	Adele		"Hello"	Adele	
