= Nocturnal (song) =

Single by Disclosure featuring the Weeknd

from the album Caracal
- Released: 16 February 2016
- Recorded: 2015
- Genre: House; synth-pop; nu-disco; alternative R&B; electronic
- Length: 6:44
- Label: PMR; Island
- Songwriters: Guy Lawrence; Howard Lawrence; James Napier; Abel Tesfaye
- Producer: Disclosure

Disclosure singles chronology
| "Magnets" (2015) | "Nocturnal" (2016) | "Moog for Love" (2016) |

The Weeknd singles chronology
| "Might Not" (2015) | "Wonderful" / "Nocturnal" (2016) | "Low Life" (2016) |

Audio video
- "Nocturnal" on YouTube

"Nocturnal" is a song by English electronic music duo Disclosure, with featured vocals by Canadian singer the Weeknd. The song was released as the fifth and final single from the duo's second studio album, Caracal, on 16 February 2016. The song peaked at number 103 on the UK Singles Chart, number 179 on the French Singles Chart, and number 16 on the Billboard Hot Dance/Electronic Songs chart.

== Track listing ==
iTunes release
| No. | Title | Length |
|---|---|---|
| 1. | "Nocturnal" (featuring the Weeknd) (Disclosure V.I.P.) | 6:28 |

Digital download
| No. | Title | Length |
|---|---|---|
| 1. | "Nocturnal" (featuring the Weeknd) (Disclosure V.I.P. and edit) | 3:59 |

== Charts ==
| Chart (2015) | Peak position |
|---|---|
| France (SNEP) | 179 |
| UK Singles (Official Charts Company) | 103 |
| UK Dance (Official Charts) | 25 |
| US Hot Dance/Electronic Songs (Billboard) | 16 |

== Release history ==
| Region | Date | Format | Version | Label(s) | Ref. |
|---|---|---|---|---|---|
| Worldwide | 16 February 2016 | Digital download | Original | PMR; Island | |
| Worldwide | 16 February 2016 | Digital download | Disclosure V.I.P. | PMR; Island | |
| Worldwide | 16 February 2016 | Digital download | Disclosure V.I.P. and edit | PMR; Island | |
