= Omen (Disclosure song) =

2015 single by Disclosure

Single by Disclosure featuring Sam Smith

from the album Caracal and In the Lonely Hour (Drowning Shadows Edition)
- Released: 27 July 2015
- Genre: Disco; house; pop
- Length: 3:50 (album version); 3:16 (radio edit)
- Label: PMR; Island
- Songwriters: Guy Lawrence; Howard Lawrence; Sam Smith; James Napier
- Producer: Disclosure

Disclosure singles chronology
"Holding On" (2015)	"Omen" (2015)	"Jaded" (2015)

Sam Smith singles chronology
"Moments" (2015)	"Omen" (2015)	"Writing's on the Wall" (2015)

Music video
- "Disclosure – Omen ft. Sam Smith" on YouTube

"Omen" is a song by the English electronic music duo Disclosure. It features vocals from English singer Sam Smith. It was released as a digital download on 27 July 2015, by Island Records. It is the second single from Disclosure's second studio album, Caracal (2015), with the acoustic version being released on the deluxe/drowning shadows edition of Smith's debut album In the Lonely Hour (2014). following "Holding On". It was written by Guy Lawrence, Howard Lawrence and Smith and co-written by Jimmy Napes. It is the second collaboration between Smith and Disclosure, following "Latch" in 2012. The song charted in multiple countries and is featured on the soundtrack for the video game, FIFA 16.

== Music video ==
A music video of the track was released on 27 July 2015. It was the second part of a three-part series, preceded by "Holding On" and followed by "Jaded". The video was filmed at the Teatro Fru Fru in Mexico City.

== Track listing ==
- Digital download
1. "Omen" (featuring Sam Smith) – 3:50
- Digital download – The Remixes
1. "Omen" (Claptone remix) – 6:10
2. "Omen" (Jonas Rathsman remix) – 8:32
3. "Omen" (Claude VonStroke remix) – 7:03
4. "Omen" (Motez remix) – 4:43
5. "Omen" (Klyne remix) – 3:25
- 12" remix EP
1. "Omen" (album version) – 3:50
2. "Omen" (Claude VonStroke remix) – 7:03
3. "Omen" (Jonas Rathsman remix) – 8:32
4. "Omen" (Motez remix) – 4:43

== Charts ==
=== Weekly charts ===
Chart (2015–2016)	Peak position
Australia (ARIA)	29
Austria (Ö3 Austria Top 40)	74
Belgium (Ultratip Bubbling Under Flanders)	2
Belgium Dance (Ultratop Flanders)	5
Belgium (Ultratip Bubbling Under Wallonia)	2
Belgium Dance (Ultratop Wallonia)	15
Canada Hot 100 (Billboard)	43
Canada CHR/Top 40 (Billboard)	34
Czech Republic Singles Digital (ČNS IFPI)	34
Denmark (Tracklisten)	27
Euro Digital Song Sales (Billboard)	8
Finland Download (Latauslista)	26
France (SNEP)	66
Germany (GfK)	74
Hungary (Single Top 40)	36
Hungary (Stream Top 40)	29
Ireland (IRMA)	29
Italy (FIMI)	64
Japan Hot 100 (Billboard)	89
Mexico (Billboard Mexican Airplay)	28
Mexico Anglo (Monitor Latino)	16
Netherlands (Dutch Top 40)	27
Netherlands (Single Top 100)	27
Netherlands (Dance Top 30)	17
New Zealand (Recorded Music NZ)	8
Portugal (AFP)	75
Scottish Singles Sales (Official Charts)	12
Slovakia Singles Digital (ČNS IFPI)	28
Sweden (Sverigetopplistan)	56
Switzerland (Schweizer Hitparade)	50
UK Singles (Official Charts)	13
UK Dance (Official Charts)	6
US Billboard Hot 100	64
US Dance Club Songs (Billboard)	1
US Hot Dance/Electronic Songs (Billboard)	5
US Pop Airplay (Billboard)	32
US Rhythmic Airplay (Billboard)	40

=== Year-end charts ===
Chart (2015)	Position
Netherlands (Dutch Top 40)	118
Netherlands (NPO 3FM)	93
US Dance Club Songs (Billboard)	50
US Hot Dance/Electronic Songs (Billboard)	19

Chart (2016)	Position
US Hot Dance/Electronic Songs (Billboard)	52

== Certifications ==
Region	Certification	Certified units/sales
Brazil (Pro-Música Brasil)	Platinum	60,000^{‡}
Denmark (IFPI Danmark)	Gold	30,000^{^}
Italy (FIMI)	Gold	25,000^{‡}
New Zealand (RMNZ)	2× Platinum	60,000^{‡}
Poland (ZPAV)	Gold	10,000^{‡}
United Kingdom (BPI)	Platinum	600,000^{‡}
United States (RIAA)	Gold	500,000^{‡}
^{^} Shipments figures based on certification alone.^{‡} Sales+streaming figures based on certification alone.

== Release history ==
Region	Date	Label	Format
Worldwide	27 July 2015	PMR; Island	Digital download

== See also ==
- List of number-one dance singles of 2015 (U.S.)
