= Bang That =

Promotional single by Disclosure

from the album Caracal (iTunes deluxe edition)
- Released: 1 May 2015
- Genre: UK funky; ghetto house
- Length: 5:26 (single version); 4:48 (album version)
- Label: PMR; Island
- Songwriters: Guy Lawrence; Howard Lawrence; Julian Shamou
- Producer: Disclosure

"Bang That" is a song by British electronic music duo Disclosure. It features the vocals sampled from 313 Bass Mechanincs' song "Pass Out". It was released worldwide on 1 May 2015 as a promotional single. The song appears on the deluxe version of the duo's second studio album, Caracal. The track was written by Guy Lawrence, Howard Lawrence and Julian Shamou.

== Track listing ==
Digital download
No.	Title	Length
1.	"Bang That" (single version)	5:26

Album version
No.	Title	Length
14.	"Bang That" (album version)	4:48

== Charts ==
Chart (2015)	Peak position
Australia (ARIA)	94
Belgium (Ultratip Bubbling Under Flanders)	37
UK Dance (OCC)	14
UK Singles (OCC)	50

== Release history ==
Region	Date	Label	Format
Worldwide	1 May 2015	PMR; Island	Digital download
