= Writing's on the Wall (Sam Smith song) =

2015 single by Sam Smith

Single by Sam Smith
- Released: 25 September 2015
- Recorded: 2015
- Studio: RAK, Abbey Road, and the Pierce Rooms (London)
- Genre: Orchestral pop
- Length: 4:38
- Label: Capitol
- Songwriters: Sam Smith; Jimmy Napes
- Producers: Jimmy Napes; Steve Fitzmaurice; Disclosure

Sam Smith singles chronology
"Omen" (2015)	"Writing's on the Wall" (2015)	"Momentarily Mine" (2016)

James Bond theme singles chronology
"Skyfall" (2012)	"Writing's on the Wall" (2015)	"No Time to Die" (2020)

Music video
- "Writing's on the Wall" on YouTube

"Writing's on the Wall" is a song by the English singer Sam Smith, written for the release of the 2015 James Bond film Spectre. The song was released as a digital download on 25 September 2015. The song was written by Smith and Jimmy Napes, and produced by the latter alongside Steve Fitzmaurice and Disclosure.

"Writing's on the Wall" received mixed reviews from critics, some comparing it unfavourably to previous Bond theme songs. The mixed reception to the song led to Shirley Bassey trending on Twitter on the day it was released. Despite this, the single became the first Bond movie theme to reach number one in the UK singles chart. It also reached the top 10 in a few other European countries, but unlike other James Bond film themes, it was not as successful outside Europe, only peaking at number 43 on the Canadian Hot 100 and in Australia and number 71 on the US Billboard Hot 100. Only the instrumental version of the song appeared on the film's official soundtrack album. The song won the Golden Globe Award for Best Original Song at the 73rd Golden Globe Awards and the Academy Award for Best Original Song at the 88th Academy Awards, making it the second consecutive Bond theme to win (after "Skyfall" by Adele from the film of the same name in 2012).

== Background and composition ==
"Writing's on the Wall"
A 27-second sample of "Writing's on the Wall". The song has been called "very slow and surprisingly restrained", with it deemed inferior to the previous James Bond theme "Skyfall".

"Writing's on the Wall" was co-written by Sam Smith and Jimmy Napes in a single session: they wrote it in under half an hour and quickly recorded a demo. They were so pleased with Smith's vocal performance that they used it on the final release. On 8 September 2015, Sam Smith announced that they were singing the song for the James Bond film Spectre. They described performing the theme as "one of the highlights of my career". The English band Radiohead also composed a song for the film, "Spectre", which went unused, and Lana Del Rey unsuccessfully submitted a song titled "24" – instead, she eventually contributed "First Light" to the video game 007 First Light (2026).

The song is written in the key of F minor with a tempo of 66 beats per minute (Larghetto). Smith's vocals range from A ♭_{3} to D♭_{5}. Smith said it was "horrible to sing" as the notes are "just so high".

== Critical reception ==
"Writing's on the Wall" received a mixed response from critics.

Alexis Petridis of The Guardian wrote that the song attempted to capture the mood of Adele's "Skyfall", but "doesn't feel anywhere near as striking [...] the chances of it joining the pantheon of Bond themes that anyone with even a passing interest in pop music can hum seem pretty slender". Chris Willman of Variety similarly noted the song was "unbecoming of a Bond movie", comparing it negatively to Adele's "Skyfall" from the previous 2012 Bond installment and Billie Eilish's "No Time to Die" from the subsequent 2021 Bond film of the same name. He ranked the song as the worst James Bond theme song.

Lewis Corner of Digital Spy rated it three out of five stars.

Neil McCormick of The Daily Telegraph called the song a "monster Bond ballad", stating, "(The song) is very, very slow and surprisingly restrained, at times floating by on resonant piano notes, the faintest brush stroke of orchestra, with all the focus on Smith's intense, tremulous vocal, rising with controlled pace and tension to an audacious chorus pay-off".

Chris DeVille of Stereogum felt it was inferior to Radiohead's rejected song.

== Commercial performance ==
In the United Kingdom, "Writing's on the Wall" became the first James Bond theme to reach number one, on the issue dated 8 October 2015. The previous highest-charting Bond themes were Adele's "Skyfall" and Duran Duran's "A View to a Kill" from the 1985 film of the same name, which both reached number two. It also became Smith's fifth UK number-one single within two years. The song spent a total of 16 consecutive weeks in the UK Singles Chart. In the United States, "Writing's on the Wall" debuted and peaked at number 71 on the Billboard Hot 100, compared to the previous Bond song, "Skyfall", which debuted at number 8 in October 2012. On the Canadian Hot 100, the song debuted at and peaked number 43. In Australia, the song performed moderately, debuting at number 44, and later peaking at number 43, but on the Irish Singles Chart, the song was a much bigger hit, debuting and peaking at number 9. The song has also charted in several other European countries though to a far lesser degree than its predecessor.

== Track listing ==
Digital download
No.	Title	Length
1.	"Writing's on the Wall"	4:38

CD single and vinyl
No.	Title	Length
1.	"Writing's on the Wall"	4:38
2.	"Writing's on the Wall" (instrumental)	4:38

== Credits and personnel ==
Recording and management

- Recorded at RAK Studios, Abbey Road Studios and The Pierce Rooms (London, England)
- Mixed at The Pierce Rooms (London, England)
- Mastered at Sterling Sound (New York City, New York)
- Cover photograph by Rankin
- Artwork and design by Studio Moross
- Published by Naughty Words Ltd. / Stellar Songs Ltd. / Sony/ATV Music Publishing / Salli Isaak Songs Limited / Universal Music Publishing Limited

Personnel

- Sam Smith – vocals, songwriter
- Jimmy Napes – producer, songwriter, piano
- Steve Fitzmaurice – producer, mixing and recording, additional programming
- Guy Lawrence – co-producer, additional programming
- Howard Lawrence – co-producer, additional programming
- Steve Price – orchestra recording
- Simon Hale – orchestra arrangement and conducting
- Charles Wong – assistant recording engineer
- Mike Horner – assistant recording engineer
- Gordon Davidson – assistant recording engineer
- Matt Jones – assistant recording engineer
- Toby Hulbert – assistant recording engineer
- Charlie Paakkari – assistant recording engineer
- Isobel Griffiths – orchestra contractor
- Lucy Whalley – assistant orchestra contractor
- Everton Nelson – orchestra leader
- Tom Coyne – mastering
- Aya Merrill – mastering assistant

== Charts ==
=== Weekly charts ===
Weekly chart performance for "Writing's on the Wall"
Chart (2015–16)	Peak position
Australia (ARIA)	43
Austria (Ö3 Austria Top 40)	11
Belgium (Ultratop 50 Flanders)	5
Belgium (Ultratop 50 Wallonia)	4
Canada Hot 100 (Billboard)	43
Czech Republic Airplay (ČNS IFPI)	39
Czech Republic Singles Digital (ČNS IFPI)	52
Euro Digital Songs (Billboard)	1
Finland Download (Latauslista)	3
France (SNEP)	5
Germany (GfK)	17
Greece Digital Songs (Billboard)	2
Hungary (Single Top 40)	2
Iceland (RÚV)	22
Ireland (IRMA)	9
Italy (FIMI)	32
Japan Hot 100 (Billboard)	50
Japan Physical Singles (Oricon)	81
Lebanon (OLT20)	3
Luxembourg Digital Songs (Billboard)	2
Mexico Ingles Airplay (Billboard)	37
Netherlands (Dutch Top 40)	35
Netherlands (Single Top 100)	32
New Zealand Heatseekers (Recorded Music NZ)	4
Portugal Digital Songs (Billboard)	10
Scottish Singles Sales (Official Charts)	1
Slovakia Airplay (ČNS IFPI)	36
Slovakia Singles Digital (ČNS IFPI)	32
Slovenia (SloTop50)	36
Spain (Promusicae)	24
Sweden (Sverigetopplistan)	63
Switzerland (Schweizer Hitparade)	5
UK Singles (Official Charts)	1
US Billboard Hot 100	71
US Adult Contemporary (Billboard)	20

=== Year-end charts ===
2015 year-end chart performance for "Writing's on the Wall"
Chart (2015)	Position
Belgium (Ultratop 50 Flanders)	88
Hungary (Rádiós Top 40)	59
Netherlands (Dutch Top 40)	159
Switzerland (Schweizer Hitparade)	73
UK Singles (OCC)	56

== Certifications ==
Certifications for "Writing's on the Wall"
Region	Certification	Certified units/sales
Australia (ARIA)	Platinum	70,000^{‡}
Brazil (Pro-Música Brasil)	Platinum	60,000^{‡}
Canada (Music Canada)	Platinum	80,000^{‡}
Denmark (IFPI Danmark)	Gold	45,000^{‡}
Italy (FIMI)	Gold	25,000^{‡}
New Zealand (RMNZ)	Gold	15,000^{‡}
Poland (ZPAV)	Platinum	20,000^{‡}
United Kingdom (BPI)	Platinum	600,000^{‡}
United States (RIAA)	Platinum	1,000,000^{‡}
^{‡} Sales+streaming figures based on certification alone.

== Release history ==
Release dates for "Writing's on the Wall"
Region	Date	Format	Label
Worldwide	25 September 2015	Digital download	Capitol
United Kingdom	23 October 2015	CD single	Capitol
United Kingdom	6 November 2015	7" vinyl	Capitol

== See also ==
- Outline of James Bond
