= The Mechanism =

Single by Disclosure and Friend Within
- Released: 15 April 2014
- Genre: Deep house; future garage; UK funky
- Length: 6:26
- Label: PMR; Island
- Songwriter(s): Guy Lawrence; Lee Stephen Mortimer
- Producer(s): Disclosure

Disclosure singles chronology
"F for You" (2014)	"The Mechanism" (2014)	"Holding On" (2015)

"The Mechanism" is a song by British electronic music duo Disclosure and Friend Within. It was released as a digital download in the United Kingdom on 15 April 2014. The song peaked at number 28 on the UK Dance Chart.

== Track listings ==
Digital download
No.	Title	Length
1.	"The Mechanism" (with Friend Within)	6:26

== Chart performance ==
=== Weekly charts ===
Chart (2014)	Peak position
UK Dance (OCC)	28

== Release history ==
Country	Date	Format	Label
United Kingdom	15 April 2014	Digital download	PMR; Island
