= Kwabs =

English singer-songwriter (born 1990)

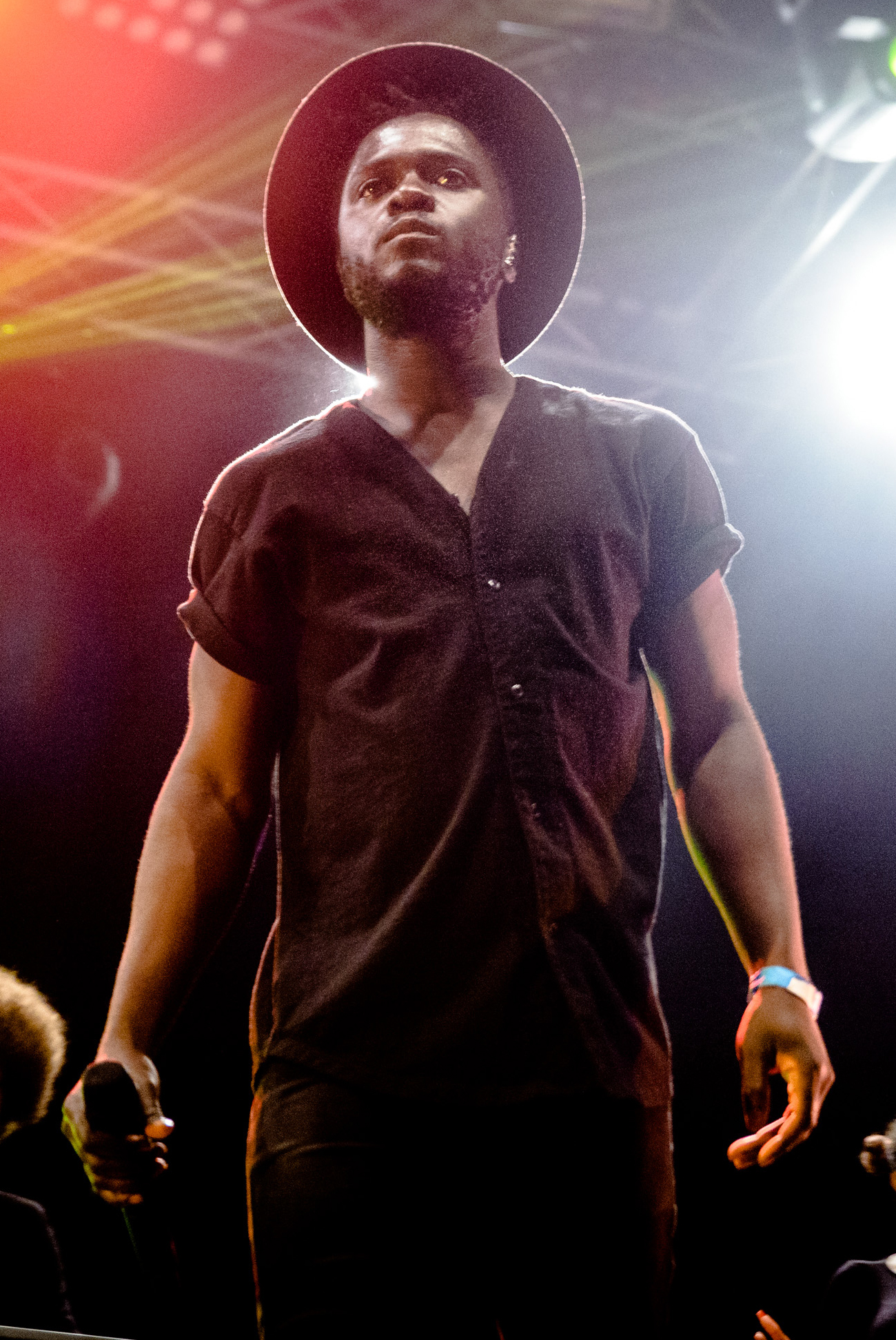
- Kwabs on stage in 2015

Background information
- Born: Kwabena Sarkodee Adjepong; 24 April 1990 (age 36); London, England
- Genres: Soul; R&B; electronica
- Occupations: Singer; songwriter
- Years active: 2011–present
- Label: Atlantic
- Website: kwabsmusic.com Archived 2021-05-19 at the Wayback Machine

Kwabena Sarkodee Adjepong (born 24 April 1990), better known by his stage name Kwabs, is an English singer and songwriter. He is best known for his international hit "Walk".

== Early life ==
Born in London, Kwabs was raised in Bermondsey, Southwark, to Ghanaian parents. At The Charter School, his music teacher Xanthe Sarr and manager of the Southwark Youth Orchestra, introduced Kwabs to the National Youth Jazz Orchestra. Accepted in the programme, he became the lead singer of the orchestra for four years. He also studied jazz at the Royal Academy of Music.

== Career ==
=== 2011–12: Beginnings ===
In 2011, Kwabs was in the BBC television show Goldie's Band: By Royal Appointment of drum-and-bass musician Goldie, a UK nationwide platform to search for young talented musicians, and one of twelve artists chosen to create some musical pieces for a special performance at Buckingham Palace. This culminated in Kwabs appearing in a 2011 presentation, performing a rendition of "Sometimes I Feel Like a Motherless Child".

In 2012, he released cover versions of "Like a Star" by Corinne Bailey Rae and "The Wilhelm Scream" by James Blake. The Kwabs version went viral on YouTube. He signed a recording contract with Atlantic Records collaborating with a number of artists for his debut EP Wrong or Right with critical acclaim.

=== 2014–present: Love + War ===
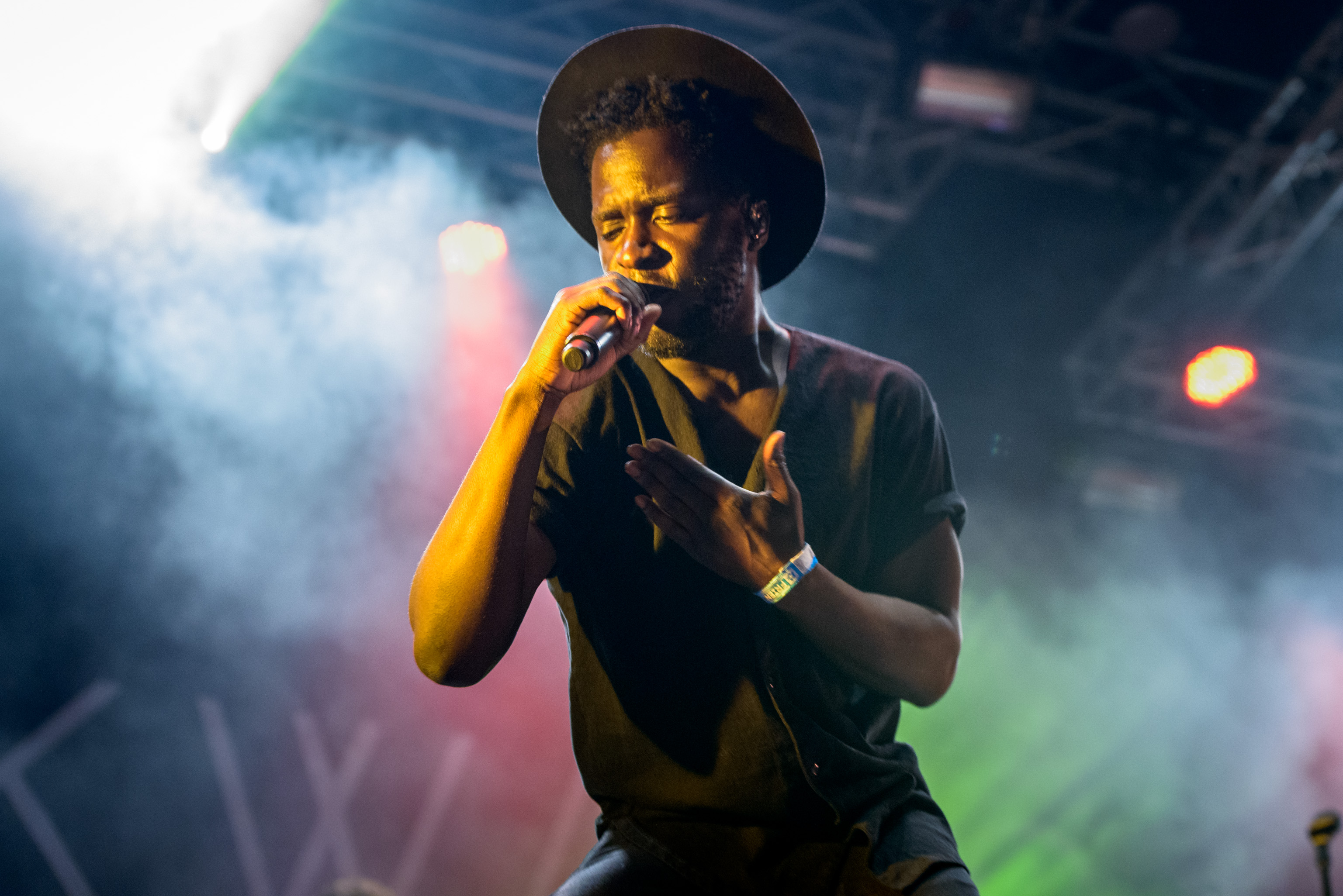
Kwabs performing in 2015

The subsequent EPs Pray for Love and Walk EP have a more pop-oriented sound, with Walk EP containing the hit single "Walk", Kwabs' best known release, launched on 5 October 2014 on Atlantic Records. It was a minor hit in the United Kingdom, reaching number 71, but became hugely popular in Germany, Austria and Switzerland. It was also number one on the iTunes Music charts. It became a hit after it was added as a part of the FIFA 15 soundtrack.

In April 2015, Kwabs released the single "Perfect Ruin", and on 11 September 2015, he released his debut studio album Love & War.

== In popular culture ==
- "Saved" was used in a number of promotional trailers for the second series of the BBC's The Musketeers.
- "Walk" was used in the soundtrack of EA Sports video game FIFA 15, along with promotional trailers for the BBC's coverage of the 2015 general election. It was also used in an ad for the WeAreUs August 2015 ad for Boohoo.com.

== Discography ==
=== Studio albums ===
Title	Details	Peak positions						
Title	Details	UK	AUT	BEL (Fl)	GER	HUN	NL	SWI
Love + War	Released: 11 September 2015; Label: Atlantic Records UK; Format: Digital download, CD	26	44	39	26	24	23	12

=== Extended plays ===
Title	Details	Notes
Wrong or Right	Released: 4 February 2014; Label: Atlantic Records UK; Format: Digital download	No. / Title / Length; 1. / "Wrong or Right" / 3:36; 2. / "Last Stand" / 3:28; 3. / "Spirit Fade" / 5:06; 4. / "Wrong or Right (Ben Pearce Remix)" / 6:07
Pray for Love	Released: 19 May 2014; Label: Atlantic Records UK; Format: Digital download	No. / Title / Length; 1. / "Pray for Love" / 3:16; 2. / "Into You" / 3:26; 3. / "Something Right" / 2:52; 4. / "Brother" / 4:27
Walk	Released: 3 October 2014; Label: Atlantic Records UK; Format: Digital download	No. / Title / Length; 1. / "Walk" / 3:34; 2. / "Saved" / 3:56; 3. / "Walk (Jaded Remix)" (featuring Jaded) / 5:30; 4. / "Walk (Royce Wood Junior Remix)" (featuring Royce Wood Junior) / 3:44

=== Singles ===
Year	Title	Peak positions								Certifications	Album
Year	Title	UK	AUT	BEL (Fl)	BEL (Wa)	GER	NL	NOR	SWI	Certifications	Album
2014	"Wrong or Right"	—	—	67^{[A]}	—	—	—	—	—		Love + War
2014	"Walk" (solo or featuring Fetty Wap)	71	3	53^{[A]}	59^{[A]}	1	98	12	4	BPI: Silver; BVMI: Platinum; IFPI AUT: Gold; IFPI SWI: Gold	Love + War
2015	"My Own"	—	—	84^{[A]}	—	—	—	—	—		Love + War
2021	"Signals" (with Regard)	—	—	—	—	—	—	—	—		Non-album single
"—" denotes a single that did not chart or was not released in that territory.

Non-charting

- 2014: "Fight for Love"
- 2014: "Pray for Love"
- 2015: "Perfect Ruin"
- 2015: "Look Over Your Shoulder"
- 2022: "Hurt A Little"

=== As featured artist ===
Year	Title	Peak positions			Album
Year	Title	UK	AUS	FRA	Album
2015	"Willing and Able" (Disclosure featuring Kwabs)	70	78	116	Caracal

=== Music videos ===
Year	Title
2014	"Wrong or Right"
2014	"Pray for Love"
2014	"Walk"
2014	"Saved"
2015	"Perfect Ruin"
2015	"Fight for Love"
2015	"My Own"
2015	"Cheating on Me"
