= Liv Dawson =

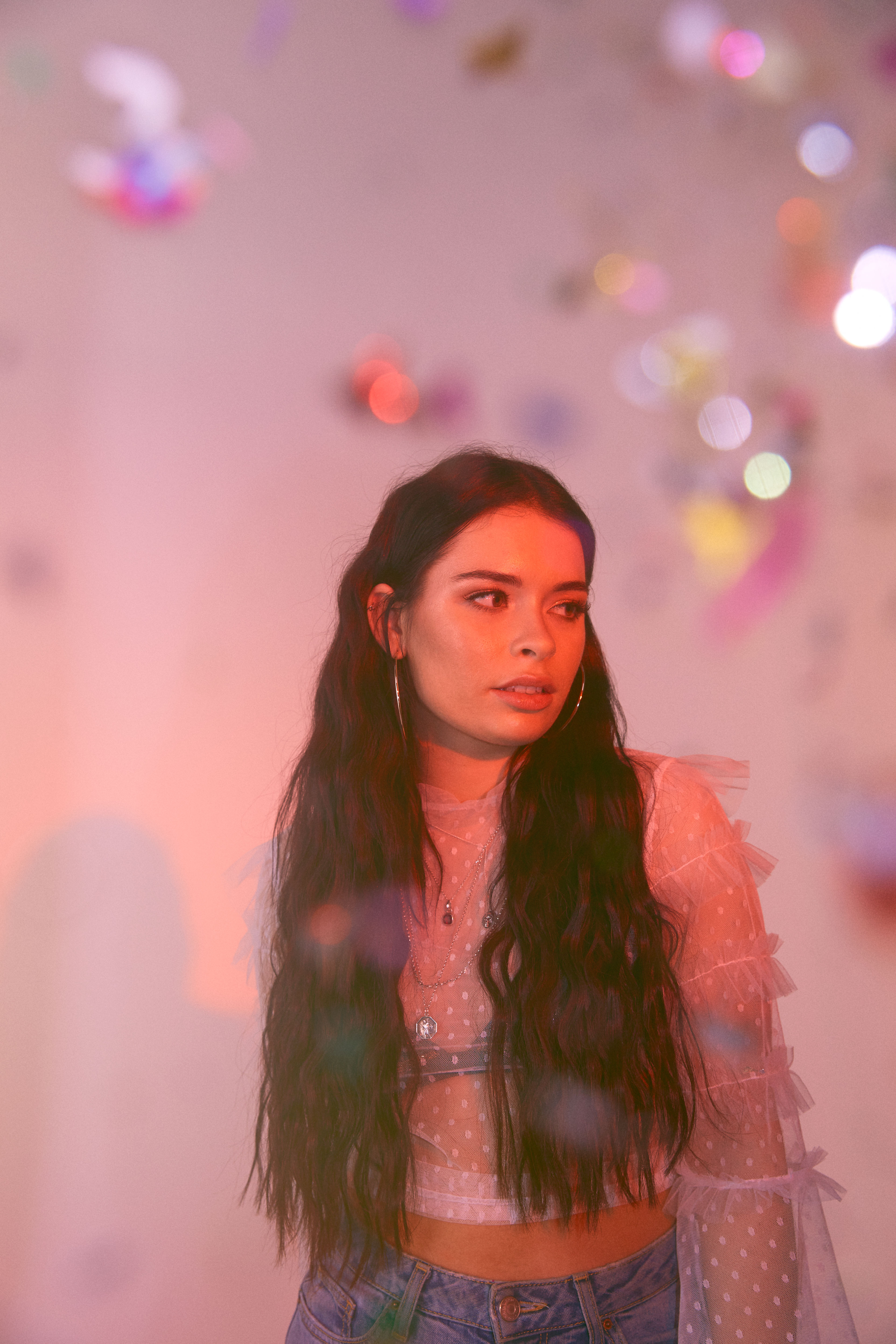

Background information
- Born: Shepperton, Surrey, England
- Genre: Pop
- Occupation: Singer-songwriter
- Years active: 2012–present
- Label: Independent

Liv Dawson is an English pop singer-songwriter. She has released the Open Your Eyes and Bedroom EPs and the "Pushing 21" single.

== Career ==
Dawson has played support slots for Tom Walker, Jessie Ware, Honne, and a UK & European tour with Khalid.

She started out playing at small venues in London. Since then, she has gone on to play at festivals including British Summer Time, Wildlife, Latitude and The Great Escape.

== Personal life ==
Dawson was born in Shepperton, a commuter town in Surrey.

== Discography ==
=== Extended plays ===
| Title | Details |
|---|---|
| Open Your Eyes | Released: 2 November 2016; Label: Method Records; Format: Digital download |
| Bedroom | Released: 16 November 2018; Label: Method Records; Format: Digital download |
| Reservations | Released: 18 November 2022; Label: Sweat Entertainment; Format: Digital download |
| Turn The Page | Released: 12 February 2025; Label: Distiller Records; Format: Digital download |
| Brace Yourself | Released: 24 July 2026; Label: Distiller Records; Format: Digital download |

=== Singles ===
| Year | Title | Album |
|---|---|---|
| 2016 | "Tapestry" | non-album single |
| 2016 | "Still" | Open Your Eyes |
| 2016 | "Reflection" | Open Your Eyes |
| 2016 | "Open Your Eyes" | Open Your Eyes |
| 2017 | "Searching" | non-album singles |
| 2017 | "Somewhere Good" | non-album singles |
| 2017 | "I'll Be Waiting" (with Redlight and Kojo Funds) | non-album singles |
| 2017 | "Painkiller" | non-album singles |
| 2017 | "Hush" | non-album singles |
| 2018 | "Talk" | non-album singles |
| 2018 | "Good Intentions" | Bedroom |
| 2018 | "I Like You" | Bedroom |
| 2019 | "Nobody but You" | Bedroom |
| 2019 | "Gold" (with dePresno) | non-album singles |
| 2019 | "Pushing 21" | non-album singles |
| 2019 | "Don't Dream It's Over" | non-album singles |
| 2020 | "Trust Issues" | non-album singles |
| 2021 | "Pretty" | Reservations |
| 2021 | "Don't Let Me Lose You" | Reservations |
| 2022 | "Last Thing on My Mind" | Reservations |
| 2022 | "Reservations" | Reservations |
| 2022 | "A Merry Little Christmas" | non-album single |
| 2024 | "Does It Even" | Turn The Page |
| 2024 | "Space" | Turn The Page |
| 2025 | "Get Back Together" | Turn The Page |
| 2026 | "Electrify" | Brace Yourself |
| 2026 | "Waiting For You" | Brace Yourself |
