= Latch (song) =

2012 single by Disclosure

Single by Disclosure featuring Sam Smith

from the album Settle
- Released: 8 October 2012
- Genre: Dance-pop; house
- Length: 4:16
- Label: PMR; Cherrytree; Interscope
- Songwriters: Guy Lawrence; Howard Lawrence; James Napier; Sam Smith
- Producer: Disclosure

Disclosure singles chronology
"Boiling" (2012)	"Latch" (2012)	"White Noise" (2013)

Sam Smith singles chronology
"When It's Alright" (2009)	"Latch" (2012)	"Lay Me Down" (2013)

Music video
- "Disclosure – Latch ft. Sam Smith (Official Video)" on YouTube

"Latch" is a song by the English electronic music duo Disclosure, featuring vocals from English singer Sam Smith. It was released as a digital download on 8 October 2012, by PMR Records. The lead single from their debut studio album, Settle (2013), the song debuted on the UK Singles Chart at number 26 and peaked at number 11. In the United States, "Latch" was a sleeper hit, peaking at number seven on the US Billboard Hot 100 in August 2014. It also reached the top 10 in Canada and France.

In 2022, American magazine Rolling Stone ranked "Latch" number 10 in their list of 200 Greatest Dance Songs of All Time.

== Background and composition ==
Originally, Disclosure thought that "Latch" was "too weird for the radio and not clubby enough for the clubs" because of its time signature. The duo stated: "It's in 6/8 time — not even 4/4, the more commonly used time signature for house music."

Howard has stated that Disclosure is "trying to bring some soul into the songwriting... using jazz chords and interesting melodies instead of boring, stabby EDM triads."

Guy Lawrence has declined to say definitively what the key of Latch is, but in a text message to Disclosure, Jacob Collier argued for the key being F minor, calling the tonality "a sick flavorsome F minor because all the bass notes are avoiding [the root note]". Latch has a tempo of 122 beats per minute.

Latch samples the song "Fairplay" by Zed Bias and Jenna G. The lyric commonly misheard at the beginning of the track and throughout as "never" is actually "another", from the line "Use my love and give yours to another."

== Critical reception ==
Michael Cragg of The Guardian wrote of the song: "it's a slowly unravelling ode to the thrill of wanting to figuratively (and possibly literally) latch on to someone else." Jon Caramanica of The New York Times viewed the track as one of the duo's "least characteristic" songs, describing it as "less relaxed, more ambitious, more blatantly pop-oriented, with full-bodied vocals". Jamieson Cox lauded the song in The Verge: "Latch" is a "song that remains this decade's prototypical piece of dance-pop. There's no such thing as a perfect song, but 'Latch' comes close: it's economic, beguiling, and precise."

== Commercial performance ==
On 10 October 2012, Greg James announced that "Latch" was at number 39 on The Official Chart Update, officially entering the UK Singles Chart at number 26 on 14 October 2012, climbing 13 places during the course of the week. In its second week, the song climbed nine places to number 17 and in its third climbed five places to number 12; it eventually peaked at number 11 in its fourth week. The song spent a total of 15 weeks within the top 40 and 32 weeks within the top 75. The song has sold over 1,800,000 copies in the UK alone, with it being certified 3× Platinum by the BPI. This puts "Latch" among the best-selling singles to not reach the top 10 of the UK Singles Chart. The single was also certified Gold by the Federazione Industria Musicale Italiana.

In 2014, "Latch" became a sleeper hit in the United States. The song was released as their debut single in the United States on 4 February 2014. On the chart dated 2 August, it topped the Billboard Dance/Electronic Songs chart during its forty-seventh week on the chart, marking the longest trip to the summit of that chart (where it remained through the chart dated 30 August). Having sold 990,000 units at the mid-way point of 2014, "Latch" reigned as one of the top-selling Dance/Electronic Songs according to Nielsen SoundScan. The song became a contemporary hit radio crossover-hit. It was the duo's first, and Smith's second, top 10 single at pop, adult pop, rhythmic, urban and urban AC radio in the US, peaking at numbers three, 10, three and nine respectively. On the chart dated 9 August, "Latch" peaked at number seven on the US Billboard Hot 100.

== Music video ==
A music video to accompany the release of "Latch" was first released onto YouTube on 9 October 2012, with a run time of 04:17. The video short was directed by Ross McDowell and Ben Murray of London's Bullion Collective and features scenes of several gay and straight couples flirting and embracing. One of the couples is home inside an apartment, another meet in a crowded elevator and begin to kiss once the others on the elevator have left, the third couple is two young women who meet in a bar, the fourth couple is two men who also meet at the bar. Sam Smith does not appear in the video. As of March 2026, the video has gained 535 million views on YouTube.

== Track listings ==
- Digital download
1. "Latch" (featuring Sam Smith) – 4:16
- Digital remixes
1. "Latch" (T. Williams club remix) – 4:07
2. "Latch" (Jamie Jones remix) – 6:31
- Vinyl
1. "Latch" (featuring Sam Smith) – 4:16
2. "Latch" (T. Williams club edit) – 4:07
- In the Lonely Hour
12. "Latch" (acoustic) – 3:43

== Charts ==
=== Weekly charts ===
Weekly chart performance for "Latch"
Chart (2012–2015)	Peak position
Australia (ARIA)	47
Australia Dance (ARIA)	6
Belgium (Ultratop 50 Flanders)	22
Belgium Dance (Ultratop Flanders)	4
Belgium (Ultratip Bubbling Under Wallonia)	36
Belgium Dance (Ultratop Wallonia)	43
Canada Hot 100 (Billboard)	6
Canada AC (Billboard)	30
Canada CHR/Top 40 (Billboard)	2
Canada Hot AC (Billboard)	8
Czech Republic Airplay (ČNS IFPI)	49
Czech Republic Singles Digital (ČNS IFPI)	24
Denmark (Tracklisten)	13
Euro Digital Song Sales (Billboard)	14
France (SNEP)	8
Ireland (IRMA)	35
Italy (FIMI)	31
Mexico (Billboard Mexican Airplay)	18
Mexico Anglo (Monitor Latino)	9
Netherlands (Single Top 100)	60
New Zealand (Recorded Music NZ)	39
Scottish Singles Sales (Official Charts)	22
Slovakia Airplay (ČNS IFPI)	58
Slovakia Singles Digital (ČNS IFPI)	15
Sweden (Sverigetopplistan)	30
UK Singles (Official Charts)	11
UK Dance (Official Charts)	3
US Billboard Hot 100	7
US Adult Pop Airplay (Billboard)	10
US Dance Club Songs (Billboard)	32
US Hot Dance/Electronic Songs (Billboard)	1
US Latin Pop Airplay (Billboard)	31
US Pop Airplay (Billboard)	3
US R&B/Hip-Hop Airplay (Billboard)	5
US Rhythmic Airplay (Billboard)	3

=== Year-end charts ===
2012 year-end chart performance for "Latch"
Chart (2012)	Position
Australia Dance (ARIA)	41
Belgium Dance (Ultratop Flanders)	66
UK Singles (OCC)	101

2013 year-end chart performance for "Latch"
Chart (2013)	Position
Belgium Dance (Ultratop Flanders)	51
UK Singles (OCC)	95
US Hot Dance/Electronic Songs (Billboard)	54

2014 year-end chart performance for "Latch"
Chart (2014)	Position
Canada (Canadian Hot 100)	38
Sweden (Sverigetopplistan)	53
US Billboard Hot 100	28
US Hot Dance/Electronic Songs (Billboard)	5
US Mainstream Top 40 (Billboard)	14
US Rhythmic (Billboard)	23

2015 year-end chart performance for "Latch"
Chart (2015)	Position
US R&B/Hip-Hop Airplay (Billboard)	33

=== Decade-end charts ===
2010s-end chart performance for "Latch"
Chart (2010–2019)	Position
US Hot Dance/Electronic Songs (Billboard)	23

== Certifications ==
Certifications for "Latch" by Disclosure featuring Sam Smith
Region	Certification	Certified units/sales
Australia (ARIA)	6× Platinum	420,000^{‡}
Brazil (Pro-Música Brasil)	2× Platinum	120,000^{‡}
Canada (Music Canada)	7× Platinum	560,000^{‡}
Denmark (IFPI Danmark)	2× Platinum	180,000^{‡}
Germany (BVMI)	Platinum	300,000^{‡}
Italy (FIMI)	2× Platinum	100,000^{‡}
New Zealand (RMNZ)	8× Platinum	240,000^{‡}
Spain (Promusicae)	Platinum	60,000^{‡}
Sweden (GLF)	2× Platinum	80,000^{‡}
United Kingdom (BPI)	4× Platinum	2,400,000^{‡}
United States (RIAA)	3× Platinum	3,000,000^{‡}
Streaming
Denmark (IFPI Danmark)	Platinum	1,800,000^{†}
^{‡} Sales+streaming figures based on certification alone.^{†} Streaming-only figures based on certification alone.

Certifications for "Latch" (Acoustic) by Sam Smith
Region	Certification	Certified units/sales
Brazil (Pro-Música Brasil)	Gold	30,000^{‡}
Denmark (IFPI Danmark)	Gold	45,000^{‡}
United Kingdom (BPI)	Gold	400,000^{‡}
United States (RIAA)	Platinum	1,000,000^{‡}
^{‡} Sales+streaming figures based on certification alone.

== Release history ==
Region	Date	Format	Label
United Kingdom	8 October 2012	Digital download	PMR
United States	4 February 2014	Mainstream radio	Cherrytree; Interscope
United States	11 March 2014	Rhythmic contemporary	Cherrytree; Interscope
