= List of songs recorded by Bloc Party =

Songs recorded by Bloc Party

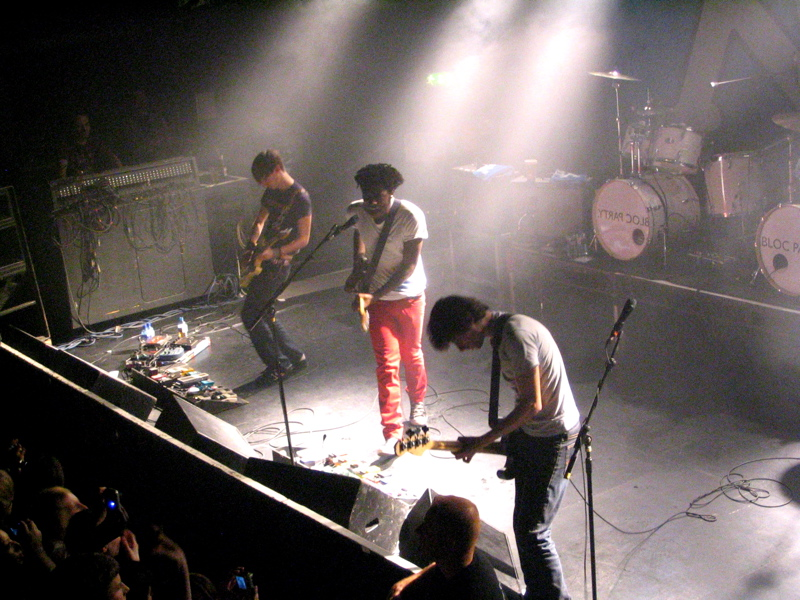
Bloc Party performing in 2006 with the original line-up of Russell Lissack (left), Kele Okereke (centre) and Gordon Moakes (right), plus drummer Matt Tong (not visible).

The English indie rock band Bloc Party have recorded 139 songs to date during their quarter-century career. The band have recorded seven studio albums, spanning from Silent Alarm (2005) to Anatomy of a Brief Romance (2026). They have also released four extended plays, spanning from Bloc Party (2004) to The High Life (2023). Bloc Party are known for their prolific recording output throughout 2004 to 2007 and their subsequent fondness for bonus tracks and B-sides; approximately a quarter of the band's recordings cannot be found on a standard release album or EP.

Songs released by the original quartet of Kele Okereke, Russell Lissack, Gordon Moakes and Matt Tong are credited simply to "Bloc Party"; this practice concluded following that lineup's final release, 2013's The Nextwave Sessions. Future releases credit each of the individual songwriters, including Louise Bartle, Justin Harris, Daniel Pugsley and Harry Deacon.

== Songs ==
Key
‡	Song released as a single
†	Song not written by members of Bloc Party
#	Song originally released as a B-side or bonus track

Name of song, writer(s), producer(s), original release, and year of release
Song	Writer(s)	Producer(s)	Original release	Year	Ref(s)
"22.01.22"	Kele Okereke; Russell Lissack; Louise Bartle; Harry Deacon	Trevor Horn	Anatomy of a Brief Romance	2026	
"3x3"	Bloc Party	Alex Newport	Four	2012	
"Acting Out" #	Kele Okereke; Russell Lissack; Louise Bartle; Justin Harris	Nick Launay; Adam Greenspan	Alpha Games (Deluxe edition)	2022	
"Always New Depths" #	Bloc Party	Paul Epworth	B-side of "Helicopter"	2004	
"Ares"	Bloc Party	Jacknife Lee	Intimacy	2008	
"Atonement" #	Bloc Party	Eliot James	A Weekend in the City (US iTunes pre-order edition)	2007 (Note: Re-released in 2024 as part of the A Weekend in the City B-Sides compilation album.)	
"Banquet" ‡	Bloc Party	Paul Epworth	Bloc Party	2004	
"Better Than Heaven"	Bloc Party	Paul Epworth	Intimacy	2008	
"Biko"	Bloc Party	Jacknife Lee	Intimacy	2008	
"Black Crown" #	Bloc Party	Alex Newport	Four (Digital bonus track edition)	2012	
"Blue Light"	Bloc Party	Paul Epworth	Silent Alarm	2005	
"By Any Means Necessary"	Kele Okereke; Russell Lissack; Louise Bartle; Justin Harris	Nick Launay; Adam Greenspan	Alpha Games	2022	
"Cain Said to Abel" #	Bloc Party		A Weekend in the City (US iTunes edition)	2007	
"Callum Is a Snake"	Kele Okereke; Russell Lissack; Louise Bartle; Justin Harris	Nick Launay; Adam Greenspan	Alpha Games	2022	
"Cavaliers and Roundheads" #	Bloc Party	Bloc Party; Justin Underhill	B-side of "Hunting for Witches"	2007	
"Children of the Future"	Bloc Party	Bloc Party	The Nextwave Sessions	2013	
"Clark Kent"	Kele Okereke; Russell Lissack; Louise Bartle; Harry Deacon	Trevor Horn	Anatomy of a Brief Romance	2026	
"Coliseum"	Bloc Party	Alex Newport	Four	2012	
"Coming on Strong" ‡	Kele Okereke; Russell Lissack; Louise Bartle; Harry Deacon	Trevor Horn	Anatomy of a Brief Romance	2026	
"Compliments"	Bloc Party	Paul Epworth	Silent Alarm	2005	
"Day Drinker"	Kele Okereke; Russell Lissack; Louise Bartle; Justin Harris	Nick Launay; Adam Greenspan	Alpha Games	2022	
"Day Four"	Bloc Party	Alex Newport	Four	2012	
"Different Drugs"	Kele Okereke; Russell Lissack	Tim Bran; Roy Kerr	Hymns	2016	
"Eden" #	Kele Okereke; Russell Lissack	Tim Bran; Roy Kerr	Hymns (Deluxe edition)	2016	
"Emma Kate's Accident" #	Bloc Party	Eliot James	A Weekend in the City (Best Buy exclusive edition)	2007	
"England" #	Bloc Party	Jacknife Lee	A Weekend in the City (Japanese edition)	2007	
"Eulogy"	Kele Okereke; Russell Lissack; Louise Bartle; Harry Deacon	Trevor Horn	Anatomy of a Brief Romance	2026	
"Evening Song" #	Kele Okereke; Russell Lissack	Tim Bran; Roy Kerr	Hymns (Deluxe edition)	2016	
"Every Time Is the Last Time" #	Bloc Party	Paul Epworth	Silent Alarm (Pregap track)	2005	
"Exes"	Kele Okereke; Russell Lissack	Tim Bran; Roy Kerr	Hymns	2016	
"Flirting Again" ‡	Kele Okereke; Russell Lissack; Louise Bartle; Harry Deacon	Charlie Andrew	Non-album single	2024	
"Flux" ‡	Bloc Party	Jacknife Lee	A Weekend in the City (Re-released CD edition)	2007	
"Fortress"	Kele Okereke; Russell Lissack	Tim Bran; Roy Kerr	Hymns	2016	
"French Exit"	Bloc Party	Bloc Party	The Nextwave Sessions	2013	
"Halo"	Bloc Party	Paul Epworth	Intimacy	2008	
"Helicopter" ‡	Bloc Party	Paul Epworth	Little Thoughts	2004	
"Hero" #	Bloc Party	Paul Epworth	B-side of "Two More Years"	2005	
"High Life" ‡	Kele Okereke; Russell Lissack; Louise Bartle; Daniel Pugsley	Charlie Andrew	The High Life	2023	
"Hunting for Witches" ‡	Bloc Party	Jacknife Lee	A Weekend in the City	2007	
"Idea for a Story" #	Bloc Party	Jacknife Lee	Intimacy (North American CD edition)	2008	
"If We Get Caught" ‡	Kele Okereke; Russell Lissack; Louise Bartle; Justin Harris	Nick Launay; Adam Greenspan	Alpha Games	2022	
"In Situ"	Kele Okereke; Russell Lissack; Louise Bartle; Justin Harris	Nick Launay; Adam Greenspan	Alpha Games	2022	
"Into the Earth"	Kele Okereke; Russell Lissack	Tim Bran; Roy Kerr	Hymns	2016	
"Ion Square"	Bloc Party	Jacknife Lee	Intimacy	2008	
"I Still Remember" ‡	Bloc Party	Jacknife Lee	A Weekend in the City	2007	
"Keep It Rolling" (with KennyHoopla) ‡	Kele Okereke; Kenneth Beasley; Russell Lissack; Louise Bartle; Daniel Pugsley; Gethin Pearson	Charlie Andrew; Gethin Pearson	The High Life	2023	
"Kettling" ‡	Bloc Party	Alex Newport	Four	2012	
"Kreuzberg"	Bloc Party	Jacknife Lee	A Weekend in the City	2007	
"Lagoon Blue" (Note: Originally released as 'Blue' on The High Life EP (2023); re-recorded and retitled for Anatomy of a Brief Romance (2026).)	Kele Okereke; Russell Lissack; Louise Bartle; Daniel Pugsley	Charlie Andrew (EP); Trevor Horn (album)	The High Life	2023	
"Leaf Skeleton" #	Bloc Party	Alex Newport	Four (Japanese edition)	2012	
"Lean" #	Bloc Party	Alex Newport	Four (Amazon MP3 edition)	2012	
"Letter to My Son" #	Bloc Party	Paul Epworth	Intimacy (Deluxe edition)	2008	
"Like Eating Glass"	Bloc Party	Paul Epworth	Silent Alarm	2005	
"Little Thoughts" ‡	Bloc Party	Paul Epworth	Little Thoughts	2004	
"Living Lux"	Kele Okereke; Russell Lissack	Tim Bran; Roy Kerr	Hymns	2016	
"Love Bombs" ‡	Kele Okereke; Russell Lissack; Louise Bartle; Harry Deacon	Trevor Horn	Anatomy of a Brief Romance	2026	
"Luno"	Bloc Party	Paul Epworth	Silent Alarm	2005	
"Mean" #	Bloc Party	Alex Newport	Four (Japanese edition)	2012	
"Mercury" ‡	Bloc Party	Jacknife Lee	Intimacy	2008	
"Montreal"	Bloc Party	Bloc Party	The Nextwave Sessions	2013	
"Moving On"	Kele Okereke; Russell Lissack; Louise Bartle; Harry Deacon	Trevor Horn	Anatomy of a Brief Romance	2026	
"Muscleworks"	Kele Okereke; Russell Lissack; Louise Bartle; Harry Deacon	Trevor Horn	Anatomy of a Brief Romance	2026	
"My True Name"	Kele Okereke; Russell Lissack	Tim Bran; Roy Kerr	Hymns	2016	
"New Blood" #	Kele Okereke; Russell Lissack	Tim Bran; Roy Kerr	Hymns (Deluxe edition)	2016	
"Not Your Problem"	Kele Okereke; Russell Lissack; Louise Bartle; Harry Deacon	Trevor Horn	Anatomy of a Brief Romance	2026	
"Now We Can't Be Friends"	Kele Okereke; Russell Lissack; Louise Bartle; Harry Deacon	Trevor Horn	Anatomy of a Brief Romance	2026	
"Obscene"	Bloc Party	Dan Carey	The Nextwave Sessions	2013	
"Octopus" ‡	Bloc Party	Alex Newport	Four	2012	
"Of Things Yet to Come"	Kele Okereke; Russell Lissack; Louise Bartle; Justin Harris	Nick Launay; Adam Greenspan	Alpha Games	2022	
"On"	Bloc Party	Jacknife Lee	A Weekend in the City	2007	
"One Month Off" ‡	Bloc Party	Paul Epworth	Intimacy	2008	
"One More Chance" ‡	Bloc Party	Jacknife Lee	Intimacy (Re-released edition)	2009	
"Only He Can Heal Me"	Kele Okereke; Russell Lissack	Tim Bran; Roy Kerr	Hymns	2016	
"Paraíso" #	Kele Okereke; Russell Lissack	Tim Bran; Roy Kerr	Hymns (Deluxe edition)	2016	
"Pigwig"	Kele Okereke; Russell Lissack; Louise Bartle; Harry Deacon	Trevor Horn	Anatomy of a Brief Romance	2026	
"Plans"	Bloc Party	Paul Epworth	Silent Alarm	2005	
"Positive Tension" ‡ (Note: Released as a double A-side with "So Here We Are" in some formats.)	Bloc Party	Paul Epworth	Silent Alarm	2005	
"Price of Gas"	Bloc Party	Paul Epworth	Silent Alarm	2005	
"Ratchet" ‡	Bloc Party	Dan Carey	The Nextwave Sessions	2013	
"Real Talk"	Bloc Party	Alex Newport	Four	2012	
"Rhododendrons" #	Bloc Party	Eliot James	A Weekend in the City (US eMusic edition)	2007	
"Rotherhithe"	Kele Okereke; Russell Lissack; Louise Bartle; Harry Deacon	Trevor Horn	Anatomy of a Brief Romance	2026	
"Rough Justice"	Kele Okereke; Russell Lissack; Louise Bartle; Justin Harris	Nick Launay; Adam Greenspan	Alpha Games	2022	
"Say It Right" (cover) †	Nelly Furtado; Tim Mosley; Nate Hills		Radio 1's Live Lounge: Vol. 2	2007	
"Secrets" #	Bloc Party	Eliot James	A Weekend in the City (Target exclusive edition)	2007	
"Selfish Son" #	Bloc Party	Eliot James	A Weekend in the City (Rhapsody edition)	2007	
"Sex Magik" ‡	Kele Okereke; Russell Lissack; Louise Bartle; Justin Harris	Nick Launay; Adam Greenspan	Alpha Games	2022	
"She's Hearing Voices" ‡	Bloc Party	Bloc Party (EP); Paul Epworth (album)	Bloc Party	2004	
"Signs" ‡ (Note: The Armand van Helden remix of "Signs" was specifically released as a single; the album version was included on some promotional copies.)	Bloc Party	Jacknife Lee	Intimacy	2008	
"Skeleton" ‡	Bloc Party	Paul Epworth	Little Thoughts	2004	
"So He Begins to Lie"	Bloc Party	Alex Newport	Four	2012	
"So Here We Are" ‡	Bloc Party	Paul Epworth	Silent Alarm	2005	
"Song for Clay (Disappear Here)"	Bloc Party	Jacknife Lee	A Weekend in the City	2007	
"So Real"	Kele Okereke; Russell Lissack; Justin Harris	Tim Bran; Roy Kerr	Hymns	2016	
"SRXT"	Bloc Party	Jacknife Lee	A Weekend in the City	2007	
"Staying Fat" ‡ (Note: Released as a double A-side with "Banquet" in some formats.)	Bloc Party	Bloc Party; Mark Aubrey; Scott McCormick	Bloc Party	2004	
"Stories"	Kele Okereke; Russell Lissack; Louise Bartle; Harry Deacon	Trevor Horn	Anatomy of a Brief Romance	2026	
"Storm and Stress" ‡ (Note: Released as a double A-side with "Little Thoughts" in some formats.)	Bloc Party	Bloc Party; Mark Aubrey; Scott McCormick	Little Thoughts	2004	
"Straight Thru Cru" #	Bloc Party	Alex Newport	Four (Japanese edition)	2012	
"Strut" #	Kele Okereke; Russell Lissack; Louise Bartle; Justin Harris	Nick Launay; Adam Greenspan	Alpha Games (Deluxe edition)	2022	
"Stunt Queen" ‡	Kele Okereke; Russell Lissack; Louise Bartle; Justin Harris	Charlie Andrew	Non-album single	2016	
"Sunday"	Bloc Party	Jacknife Lee	A Weekend in the City	2007	
"Talons"	Bloc Party	Paul Epworth	Intimacy	2008	
"Team A"	Bloc Party	Alex Newport	Four	2012	
"The Answer"	Bloc Party; Liz Neumayr	Bloc Party	Bloc Party	2004	
"The Blood Moon"	Kele Okereke; Russell Lissack; Louise Bartle; Daniel Pugsley	Charlie Andrew	The High Life	2023	
"The Girls Are Fighting" ‡	Kele Okereke; Russell Lissack; Louise Bartle; Justin Harris	Nick Launay; Adam Greenspan	Alpha Games	2022	
"The God Vibration" #	Russell Lissack	Tim Bran; Roy Kerr	Hymns (Vinyl edition; hidden track)	2016	
"The Good News" ‡	Kele Okereke; Russell Lissack	Tim Bran; Roy Kerr	Hymns	2016	
"The Healing"	Bloc Party	Alex Newport	Four	2012	
"The Love Within" ‡	Kele Okereke; Russell Lissack	Tim Bran; Roy Kerr	Hymns	2016	
"The Marshals Are Dead" ‡	Bloc Party	Bloc Party (EP); Paul Epworth (single)	Bloc Party	2004	
"The Once and Future King" #	Bloc Party	Eliot James	A Weekend in the City (Target exclusive edition)	2007	
"The Peace Offering"	Kele Okereke; Russell Lissack; Louise Bartle; Justin Harris	Nick Launay; Adam Greenspan	Alpha Games	2022	
"The Pioneers" ‡	Bloc Party	Paul Epworth	Silent Alarm	2005	
"The Prayer" ‡	Bloc Party	Jacknife Lee	A Weekend in the City	2007	
"The Present"	Bloc Party	Ben Hillier	Help!: A Day in the Life	2005	
"The Robot and the Psychonaut" #	Kele Okereke; Russell Lissack; Louise Bartle; Justin Harris	Nick Launay; Adam Greenspan	Alpha Games (Deluxe edition)	2022	
"This Modern Love"	Bloc Party	Paul Epworth	Silent Alarm	2005	
"Traps" ‡	Kele Okereke; Russell Lissack; Louise Bartle; Justin Harris	Nick Launay; Adam Greenspan	Alpha Games	2022	
"Trojan Horse"	Bloc Party	Paul Epworth	Intimacy	2008	
"Truth" ‡	Bloc Party	Alex Newport	Four	2012	
"Tulips" ‡	Bloc Party	Paul Epworth	Little Thoughts	2004	
"Two More Years" ‡	Bloc Party	Paul Epworth	Silent Alarm (Re-released edition)	2005	
"Uniform"	Bloc Party	Jacknife Lee	A Weekend in the City	2007	
"V.A.L.I.S." ‡	Bloc Party	Alex Newport	Four	2012	
"Version 2.0" #	Bloc Party	Eliot James	A Weekend in the City (Best Buy exclusive edition)	2007	
"Virtue" ‡	Kele Okereke; Russell Lissack	Tim Bran; Roy Kerr	Hymns	2016	
"Vision of Heaven" #	Bloc Party	Eliot James	Non-album release (PureVolume promotional track)	2007 (Note: Included on a dedicated release for the first time in 2024 as part of the A Weekend in the City B-Sides compilation album.)	
"Waiting for the 7.18"	Bloc Party	Jacknife Lee	A Weekend in the City	2007	
"We Are Not Good People"	Bloc Party	Alex Newport	Four	2012	
"We Were Lovers" #	Bloc Party	Jacknife Lee	A Weekend in the City (Japanese edition)	2007	
"Where Is Home?"	Bloc Party	Jacknife Lee	A Weekend in the City	2007	
"Worst Birthday Ever"	Kele Okereke; Russell Lissack; Louise Bartle; Harry Deacon	Trevor Horn	Anatomy of a Brief Romance	2026	
"X-Cutioner's Song" #	Bloc Party	Bloc Party	The Nextwave Sessions (iTunes bonus track edition)	2013	
"Your Visits Are Getting Shorter" #	Bloc Party	Jacknife Lee	Intimacy (Deluxe edition)	2008	
"You Should Know the Truth"	Kele Okereke; Russell Lissack; Louise Bartle; Justin Harris	Nick Launay; Adam Greenspan	Alpha Games	2022	
"Zephyrus"	Bloc Party	Jacknife Lee	Intimacy	2008	
