= Henricks =

Henricks is a surname. Notable people with the surname include:

- Jon Henricks (1935–2026), Australian swimmer
- Terence T. Henricks (born 1952), American astronaut
- Nate Henricks (born 1987), songwriter, producer, and visual artist
- Nelson Henricks (born 1963), Canadian artist
- Robert Henricks (born 1943), American theologian
- Thomas S. Henricks, American academic

== See also ==
- Henrick
