= Truth (Bloc Party song) =

Single by Bloc Party

from the album Four
- Released: 25 February 2013
- Recorded: 2012
- Genre: Indie rock; alternative rock
- Length: 4:00
- Label: Frenchkiss
- Songwriters: Russell Lissack; Gordon Moakes; Kele Okereke; Matt Tong
- Producer: Alex Newport

Bloc Party singles chronology
"Octopus" (2012)	"Truth" (2013)	"Ratchet" (2013)

"Truth" is a song by the British indie rock band Bloc Party, released as the third single from the band's fourth album Four on 25 February 2013.

== Music video ==
A video for the song, shot in November 2012, was released onto YouTube on 15 January 2013. The video was shot at 120 frames per second by Clemens Habicht, as it shows the members of the band dancing and jumping through colored smoke clouds in an open field.

It is the last music video to feature the band's original lineup, as their next music video (for "Ratchet") consists of footage from some of the band's previous music videos.

== Track listing ==
Digital download – EP
No.	Title	Length
1.	"Truth"	4:00
2.	"Truth" (Jerome LOL Remix)	6:18
3.	"Truth" (A. Chal Remix)	4:29
4.	"Truth" (IO Echo Remix)	3:56

== Personnel ==
Bloc Party

- Kele Okereke - lead vocals, rhythm guitar
- Russell Lissack - lead guitar
- Gordon Moakes - bass guitar, backing vocals
- Matt Tong - drums, backing vocals

Production

- Alex Newport - producer
