= RAC (musician) =

American musician and record producer (born 1985)

- Born: André Allen Anjos; 1985 (age 40–41); Portugal
- Origin: Portland, Oregon, U.S.
- Genres: Indie rock; alternative dance; electronic
- Occupation: DJ
- Label: Counter Records
- Website: RAC.fm

Twitch information
- Channel: RAC
- Years active: 2013–present
- Followers: 19,010
- Last updated: February 2025

André Allen Anjos, better known by his stage name RAC, is an American Portuguese musician and record producer based in Oregon. RAC has created more than 200 remixes in the rock, electronica, and dance music genres for various musical artists, with his work featured in ads from Citigroup and Hulu, among others. The live, five-piece touring act has been featured at the Coachella Valley Music and Arts Festival, Firefly Music Festival, Bumbershoot, Corona Capital music festival and Lollapalooza music festival. Anjos now resides in the USA.

== Personal life ==
André Anjos was born in 1985 in Portugal, to an American mother and a Portuguese father. Anjos's family moved frequently and he has stated that he attended “ten different schools” until his parents settled in Santa Maria da Feira, near Porto. Anjos took up playing the piano when he was 6 and got his first guitar when he was 13. He lived in the US for a time with his parents in the mid-1990s and went back in 2005 to study Music, Media, and Entertainment Business at Greenville College in Illinois. At college he met his former wife Liz, who was a piano major. They moved to Portland after graduating and frequently collaborated. As a musician, Liz Anjos performs under the name Pink Feathers. Anjos' parents and brother have also moved to the U.S. He is currently dating American model Ireland Baldwin and in December 2022, Baldwin announced on Instagram that they were expecting their first child together. On May 18, 2023, Baldwin gave birth to their daughter named Holland.

== Music career ==
=== Founding Remix Artist Collective ===
The Remix Artist Collective was created in January 2007 by André Allen Anjos, after recruiting fellow online remixers Aaron Jasinski and Chris Angelovski. Originally from Porto, Portugal, Anjos founded RAC in Greenville, Illinois, U.S. while he was a student at Greenville College, and became coordinator of the Remix Artist Collective. Later, Andrew Maury (New York City) and Karl Kling (Portland) joined RAC. RAC's first release was "Sleeping Lessons (RAC Mix)" for The Shins, earning the remix a spot as a B-Side on the single release for "Australia." The mix, along with several other projects garnered interest among bands like Tokyo Police Club, Bloc Party, and Ra Ra Riot.

RAC's 2008 Sega Vs. Nintendo EP spurred interest by bloggers and earned a headline from the gaming site Kotaku. In addition to the mention and posting of remixes by online publications such as Pitchfork Media and Brooklyn Vegan, RAC has received more formal recognition in a full-length feature cover article for the St. Louis Riverfront Times, an online interview with Stereo Subversion, and an exclusive free mp3 debut through Stereogum.

RAC has remixed artists such as Kings of Leon, Lana Del Rey, Yeah Yeah Yeahs, Edward Sharpe, Death Cab For Cutie, Phoenix, Foster The People, Linkin Park, Two Door Cinema Club, Bob Marley, U2, Ella Fitzgerald, New Order, Lady Gaga, Odesza, and Washed Out.

=== RAC as a solo project ===
In 2012 André decided it was time to make original music and thus RAC developed into a solo project. On May 3rd 2012 he released his first original song called "Hollywood" featuring Penguin Prison's Chris Glover via Green Label Sound. It was the promotional single to the debut RAC original album.

RAC released his second original song "Let Go" featuring Bloc Party's Kele and MNDR on August 20, 2013. "Let Go" was the second single from his EP "Don't Talk To", released October 1, 2013. RAC's debut studio album as Anjos' solo project, Strangers, was released on April 1, 2014. The title refers to the fact that the album was primarily made online, with Anjos never meeting most of the collaborators in real life.

RAC performed at music festivals including the Coachella Valley Music and Arts Festival, Firefly Music Festival, Bumbershoot, the Corona Capital music festival, Ultra Music Festival and the Lollapalooza.

Anjos has been nominated for a Grammy Award in the category Best Remixed Recording, Non-Classical three times, winning once. The first for Say My Name (Odesza featuring Zyra) in 2016. The year after, the remix of Bob Moses' "Tearing Me Up" won in the 59th Annual Grammy Awards. In 2021 RAC was once again nominated with a remix of Phil Goods' "Do you ever (RAC Mix)".

He also played a major role in the production of Linkin Park's seventh studio album One More Light.

=== Other works ===
Outside of remixing, Anjos has done work creating original music content for HBO's Entourage, and was a principal member of the indie-electronica band, The Pragmatic until its end in 2010. RAC also composed and performed the soundtrack for the videogame Master Spy.

== Style and influences ==
The vision of the Remix Artist Collective was to maintain a style of remixing that strays from the "club mix" archetype, creating new incarnations of songs that stem from the original structure, but expand on their genre and musical arrangement. Early RAC mixes typically feature a blend of hip-hop and vintage drum machine samples, analog synthesizers, melodic hooks, and original instrumentation performed by the remix artists themselves.

Annie Zaleski of the Riverfront Times wrote of Anjos' style: "Unlike many electronic remixes, which are commonly technical and precise, RAC mixes embody a unique aesthetic built on emotion and nuance, an almost intangible warmth and innate playfulness." Anjos' signature remixing sound is in large part a result of some of his equipment, notably, a 1982 Roland Juno-60 and 1973 Univox MiniKorg, though he has also been known to manipulate analog tape machines to achieve effects, and primarily works with Ableton Live to do so.

== Members of Remix Artist Collective ==
RAC
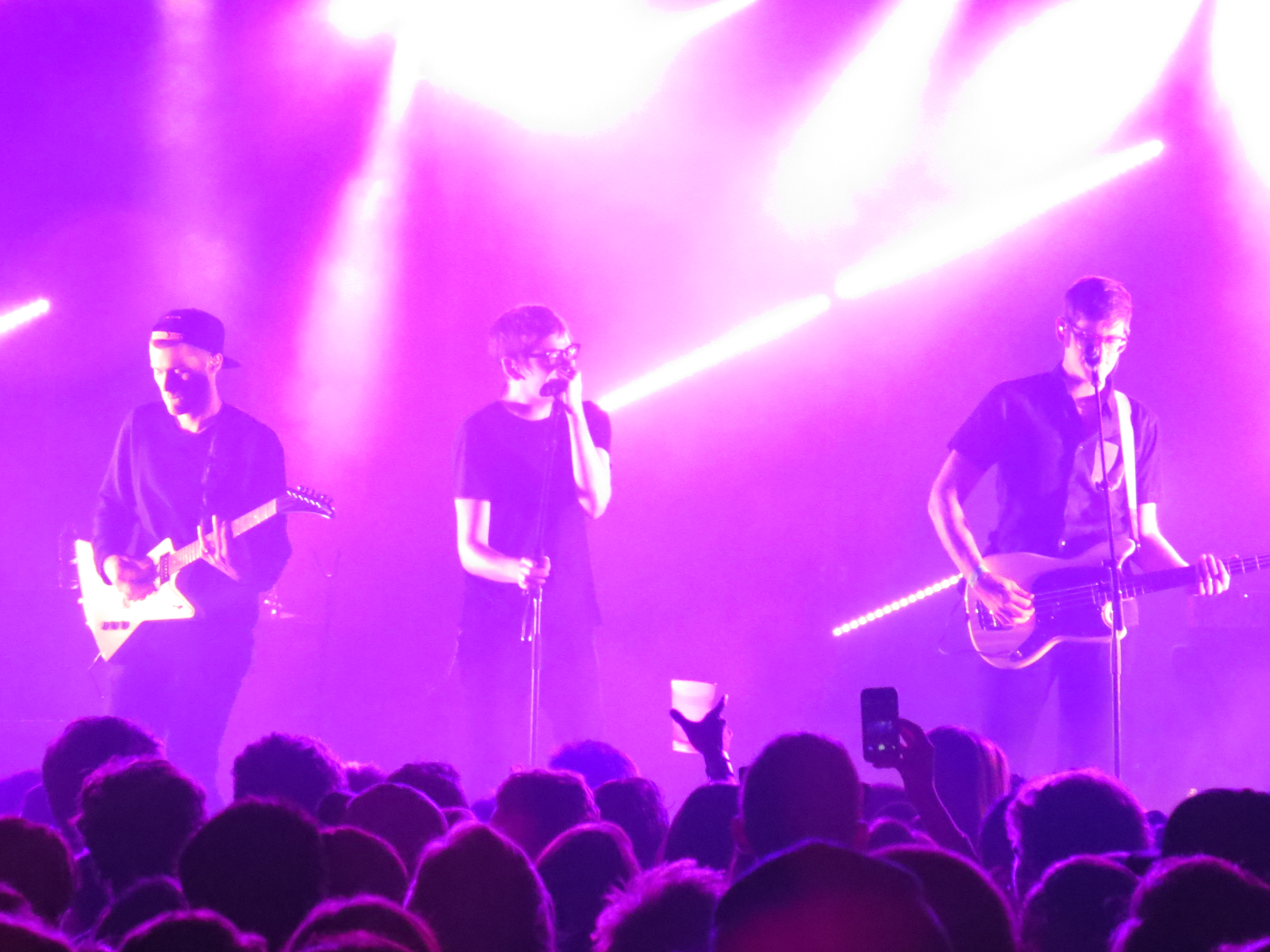

Background information
- Also known as: Remix Artist Collective
- Origin: Portland, Oregon, U.S.
- Genres: Nu-disco; indietronica; indie rock; alternative dance; synthpop; electronica
- Years active: 2007 – present
- Labels: Cherrytree, Interscope
- Members: André Allen Anjos
- Past members: Aaron Jasinski; Chris Angelovski; Andrew Maury; Karl Kling
- Website: remixartistcollective.com

Current members

- André Allen Anjos

Former members

- Andrew Maury
- Aaron Miller
- Karl Kling
- Aaron Jasinski
- Chris Angelovski

== Discography ==
=== Albums ===
| Year | Title | Release details |
|---|---|---|
| 2010 | Holy Rollers OST | |
| 2012 | Chapter One | Remix compilation |
| 2014 | Strangers | Interscope/Cherrytree (Mar 3, 2014 / Apr 1, 2014) |
| 2015 | Master Spy | Original soundtrack, Battlestation Records (Sep 11, 2015) |
| 2017 | Ego | Counter Records (July 14, 2017) |
| 2020 | Boy | Counter Records (May 8, 2020) |
| 2025 | Clouds | Battlestation Records (February 28, 2025) |

=== Extended plays ===
| Year | Title | Release details |
|---|---|---|
| 2008 | RAC VOL. 1 | Stereogum (2008) |
| 2008 | Nintendo VS Sega | 2008 |
| 2009 | RAC VOL. 1.5 | 2009 |
| 2011 | Nintendo VS Sega 2 | |
| 2011 | RAC Vol. 2 | 2011 |
| 2013 | Don't Talk To | |
| 2014 | Cheap Sunglasses (Remixes) | |
| 2015 | Back of the Car | Remix compilation, Battlestation Records (Oct 16, 2015) |
| 2019 | Closer | |
| 2021 | You | |
| 2024 | HYPER | Battlestation Records (March 8, 2024) |

=== Singles ===
| Year | Title | Album | Release details |
|---|---|---|---|
| 2010 | "If You Forget Me" (featuring Liset Alea) | Holy Rollers OST | Self-released |
| 2012 | "Hollywood" (featuring Penguin Prison) | Strangers | Green Label Sound |
| 2013 | "Let Go" (featuring Kele and MNDR) | Strangers | Cherrytree/Interscope |
| 2014 | "Cheap Sunglasses" (featuring Matthew Koma) | Strangers | Cherrytree/Interscope |
| 2015 | "We Belong" (featuring Katie Herzig) | Strangers | Cherrytree/Interscope |
| 2015 | "Back of the Car" (featuring Nate Henricks) | Non-album single | Battlestation Records |
| 2015 | "Falling Hard" (featuring Madi Diaz) | Non-album single | Battlestation Records |
| 2015 | "Can't Forget You" (featuring Chelsea Lankes) | Non-album single | Battlestation Records |
| 2015 | "3am" (featuring Katie Herzig) | Non-album single | Battlestation Records |
| 2015 | "One House" (featuring Speak) | Non-album single | Battlestation Records |
| 2015 | "Magic Hour" (featuring Little Boots) | Non-album single | Battlestation Records |
| 2017 | "This Song" (featuring Rostam) | Ego | Counter Records |
| 2017 | "I Still Wanna Know" (featuring Rivers Cuomo) | Ego | Counter Records |
| 2017 | "The Beautiful Game" (featuring St. Lucia) | Ego | Counter Records |
| 2017 | "Unusual" (featuring MNDR) | Ego | Counter Records |
| 2017 | "Fever" (featuring Kna) | Ego | Counter Records |
| 2019 | "Never Let You Go" (featuring Matthew Koma and Hilary Duff) | Non-album single | Counter Records |

== Grammy Awards ==
| Year | Nominee / work | Award | Result | Ref. |
|---|---|---|---|---|
| 2016 | "Say My Name" (RAC Remix) | Best Remixed Recording | Nominated | |
| 2017 | "Tearing Me Up" (RAC Remix) | Best Remixed Recording | Won | |
| 2021 | "Do You Ever" (RAC Mix) | Best Remixed Recording | Nominated | |
