= Four (Bloc Party album) =

Studio album by Bloc Party
- Released: 20 August 2012
- Recorded: October 2011 – April 2012
- Studios: Stratosphere Sound (New York City)
- Genres: Alternative rock; indie rock; dance-punk; art punk
- Length: 43:29
- Label: Frenchkiss
- Producer: Alex Newport

Bloc Party chronology
Intimacy Remixed (2009)	Four (2012)	The Nextwave Sessions (2013)

Singles from Four
- 1. "Octopus" Released: 11 July 2012; 2. "Kettling" Released: 4 October 2012; 3. "Truth" Released: 25 February 2013

Four is the fourth studio album by British rock band Bloc Party. It was recorded in late 2011 and early 2012 at Stratosphere Sound, New York City, with producer Alex Newport. Newport also produced Wreckonomics—the EP of bassist Gordon Moakes' side project, Young Legionnaire. It was released on 20 August 2012 on independent label Frenchkiss Records, and was made available to stream the week preceding its release. The album peaked at number 3 in the UK Albums Chart, and at number 36 on the Billboard 200 chart in the United States. It is the last album featuring the original line-up with Gordon Moakes and Matt Tong.

The band recorded the album using a more guitar-oriented sound, reminiscent of their debut album, Silent Alarm.

== Origins and recording ==
Following the release of electronic music-inspired third album Intimacy in 2008 and single "One More Chance" the following year, Bloc Party went on an indefinite hiatus as their contract with Wichita came to an end. During the break, members of the band continued with various side projects; lead guitarist Russell Lissack returned to Pin Me Down and joined Ash for a number of live dates, multi-instrumentalist Gordon Moakes formed Young Legionnaire, and frontman Kele Okereke released debut solo album The Boxer. During this period, rumours spread about the future of the band; in interviews with NME, Okereke said he feared being "fired", and Lissack later implied the band were seeking a new vocalist. Rumours of a reunion were fuelled by a Christmas photograph circulated on Twitter showing all four members of the band together, and four months later Lissack confirmed the group's intention to record a new album.

Four was recorded between winter 2011 and spring 2012 at Stratosphere Sound in New York City. The idea to record in New York with producer Alex Newport came about after Okereke and drummer Matt Tong relocated to Manhattan. Initially the band rehearsed material then recorded it soon after. Okereke told BBC 1 presenter Zane Lowe that recording of the rehearsed material added to the album's live sound and that the album itself was mainly recorded live with very few takes.

== Content ==
Although many of the songs were written in studio in rehearsal sessions, some songs, such as the album's opener "So He Begins to Lie", were written prior to recording, after an idea from guitarist Russell Lissack. Other songs, such as the lead single "Octopus" came about from Lissack's experimentation with effects pedals and loops. Okereke, who wrote all of the album's lyrics, based songs on a wide range of issues. "Team A" is said to be based on the New York drug scene, and "V.A.L.I.S." is based on the 1981 science fiction novel by Philip K. Dick. Other songs, such as "So He Begins to Lie", were based on reality television.

== Promotion and release ==
The album was officially announced in a blog post by Okereke. In the post Okereke revealed the album title and cover art and stated that the album was the best thing that the band had ever done, making note of the fact that they wanted to challenge themselves by not "relying on protools or the invisible grid that seems to be mapping out all of popular music these days." The goal of the album was to create a sound that resembled four people playing in a room, a return to the formula of their debut album Silent Alarm.

The album's cover art was designed by bassist Gordon Moakes. The four circles is said to represent a different member of the band. The colour red represents Okereke, blue represents Moakes, yellow Lissack and green Tong.

== Reception ==
=== Critical response ===
Professional ratings
Aggregate scores
Source	Rating
Metacritic	68/100
Review scores
Source	Rating
AllMusic	4/5 stars
BBC Music	favourable
Clash	8/10
Drowned in Sound	8/10
The Independent	3/5 stars
The Observer	4/5 stars
Pitchfork	4.9/10
The Quietus	mixed
Slant Magazine	2.5/5 stars
Under the Radar	4/10 stars

Four received "generally favourable reviews" from critics; at Metacritic, which assigns a normalised rating out of 100 to reviews from mainstream critics, the album received an average score of 68 based on 34 reviews. The Observer's Phil Mongrendien has praised the album's "urgency" and said it bears "the sound of a band rediscovering what made them so special in the first place" While criticising the "hesitant and unpolished" slower tracks, a review by Jaime Gill on the BBC Music website remarked that Bloc Party now sound "full of potential where just four years ago they sounded depleted" and touted the record as "2012's most exciting guitar album".

The album also received some more mixed reviews. Ian Cohen from Pitchfork was more critical, criticising what he calls a "revisionist history" attempt to move back to a guitar-focused sound, and saying that the band "don't have the physical stamina to properly recreate Silent Alarm." Marc Burrows of Drowned in Sound felt the record lacked "instant classics" but was "considerably more consistent, and consistently enjoyable... than either of its predecessors". Writing for The Quietus, Matthew Foster said that while the record is "laced with some of the band's hands-down strongest work", citing "The Healing" and "Truth" as examples, the louder tracks such as "Kettling" suffer from what he called a "reliance on the insta-drama of shredding and shrieking". Under the Radar pointed a certain "nonchalance" and suggested that "the album is never really able to build its momentum". Yet, Selena Fragassi noted that the single "Octopus" stood out for guitarist Russell Lissack's work.

=== Commercial ===
The album entered the UK Official Albums Chart at No. 3, the band's fourth top 10 album on the chart.

In the United States, the album debuted at No. 36 on the Billboard 200 albums chart on its first week of release, with around 10,000 copies sold. It also debuted at No. 11 on the Billboard's Rock Albums chart, and No. 7 on the Alternative Albums charts. As of January 2016, the album has sold 33,000 copies in the US.

== Track listing ==
All tracks are written by Bloc Party.

No.	Title	Length
1.	"So He Begins to Lie"	3:34
2.	"3x3"	2:39
3.	"Octopus"	3:05
4.	"Real Talk"	4:14
5.	"Kettling"	3:41
6.	"Day Four"	4:11
7.	"Coliseum"	2:29
8.	"V.A.L.I.S."	3:20
9.	"Team A"	4:37
10.	"Truth"	4:00
11.	"The Healing"	4:19
12.	"We Are Not Good People"	3:20

Deluxe edition bonus tracks
No.	Title	Length
13.	"Mean"	3:27
14.	"Leaf Skeleton"	3:39

UK deluxe edition bonus disc
No.	Title	Length
1.	"Ratchet"	3:18
2.	"Obscene"	3:44
3.	"French Exit"	2:52
4.	"Montreal"	4:39
5.	"Children of the Future"	3:07
6.	"X-Cutioner's Song"	2:01
7.	"Ratchet" (Rustie Remix)	3:26

Bonus track on select streaming services
No.	Title	Length
13.	"Black Crown"	1:55

Amazon MP3 bonus track
No.	Title	Length
13.	"Lean"	3:52

== Personnel ==
The people involved in the making of Four are the following:

Bloc Party

- Kele Okereke – lead vocals, rhythm guitar (except track 3)
- Russell Lissack – lead guitar
- Gordon Moakes – bass guitar, backing vocals
- Matt Tong – drums, backing vocals

Additional musicians

- Marika Hughes – cello
- Forest Christenson – violin
- Karen Piper – additional vocals

Technical personnel

- Alex Newport – producer, mixing, recording
- Atsuo Matsumoto – recording assistant, additional engineering
- Alex Prieto – mixing assistant
- Ted Jensen – mastering
- Yuki Shingai – photography
- Bloc Party – design

== Chart positions ==
Chart (2012)	Peak position
Australian Albums (ARIA)	3
Austrian Albums (Ö3 Austria)	10
Belgian Albums (Ultratop Flanders)	2
Belgian Albums (Ultratop Wallonia)	7
Canadian Albums (Billboard)	9
Dutch Albums (Album Top 100)	21
French Albums (SNEP)	21
Irish Albums (IRMA)	10
Japanese Albums (Oricon)	45
New Zealand Albums (RMNZ)	17
Spanish Albums (Promusicae)	95
Swedish Albums (Sverigetopplistan)	57
Swiss Albums (Schweizer Hitparade)	16
UK Albums (Official Charts)	3
US Billboard 200	36
