= The Nextwave Sessions =

EP by Bloc Party
- Released: 12 August 2013
- Recorded: 2013
- Genres: Post-punk revival, indie rock, alternative rock
- Length: 19:01
- Label: Frenchkiss Records
- Producer: Dan Carey

Bloc Party chronology
Four (2012)	The Nextwave Sessions (2013)	Hymns (2016)

Singles from The Nextwave Sessions
- 1. "Ratchet" Released: 25 June 2013

Professional ratings
Aggregate scores
Source	Rating
Metacritic	64/100
Review scores
Source	Rating
Alternative Press	3.5/5 stars
The A.V. Club	B−
Consequence of Sound	2.5/5 stars
Drowned in Sound	4/10
Pitchfork Media	5.2/10
Slant Magazine	2.5/5 stars

The Nextwave Sessions is an extended play by British indie rock band Bloc Party. It was released on 12 August 2013 in the United Kingdom, and 13 August in the United States, via Frenchkiss Records. "Ratchet" and "Obscene" were recorded with Dan Carey, who had previously worked with Bat for Lashes and Hot Chip. It features five previously unreleased songs that were given live debuts on the band's 2013 North American tour. This is the final Bloc Party release to feature founding members Matt Tong and Gordon Moakes who left the band in 2013 and 2015 respectively.

"Ratchet", the EP's lead track, was given its first radio play by Zane Lowe on BBC Radio 1 on 25 June. An accompanying video, created by Cyriak using heavily edited footage from the music videos for "Octopus", "Hunting for Witches", "Little Thoughts" and "Helicopter", was released on the band's Vevo channel on the same day.

== Track listing ==
No.	Title	Length
1.	"Ratchet"	3:18
2.	"Obscene"	3:44
3.	"French Exit"	2:52
4.	"Montreal"	4:39
5.	"X-Cutioner's Song" (iTunes bonus track)	2:01
6.	"Children of the Future"	3:07
Total length:		19:01
