= Anatomy of a Brief Romance =

Studio album by Bloc Party
- Released: 11 September 2026
- Recorded: Late 2025
- Studio: Trevor Horn's Belsize Park studio (London)
- Genre: Indie rock
- Length: 48:53
- Labels: Contagious; Virgin
- Producer: Trevor Horn

Bloc Party chronology
Alpha Games (2022)	Anatomy of a Brief Romance (2026)

Singles from Anatomy of a Brief Romance
- 1. "Coming On Strong" Released: 12 May 2026; 2. "Love Bombs" Released: 30 June 2026; 3. "Now We Can't Be Friends" Released: 28 July 2026; 4. "Pigwig" Released: 18 August 2026; 5. "Lagoon Blue" Released: 8 September 2026

Anatomy of a Brief Romance is the seventh studio album by the English indie rock band Bloc Party, released on 11 September 2026 by Contagious Ltd through Virgin Music Group. Produced by Trevor Horn, it is the band's first studio album since Alpha Games (2022) and the first to feature bassist Harry Deacon.

The album follows a brief relationship in the life of lead singer Kele Okereke in chronological order, from the moment he first saw his partner through the break-up and its aftermath. Its sound relies more heavily on synthesisers than the band's earlier work. Five singles preceded the album, beginning with "Coming On Strong" in May 2026. It reached number six on the UK Albums Chart and received mixed reviews, with some critics praising its candour and Horn's production and others finding the lyrics clichéd or self-indulgent.

== Background and recording ==
In a January 2025 interview with Billboard UK, Kele Okereke said that the next Bloc Party album would be "very personal and confessional". He attributed this to a year of difficult relationships, describing the album as "the study of a fleeting relationship from start to finish". He said that the album grew out of a relationship with someone who "wasn't honest" and that he felt he needed to speak publicly about it. By the time of this interview, all the songs had been written and the band expected to begin recording soon.

In May 2025, Okereke told NME that the band was working on the album with Trevor Horn, whom he called a "super-producer" who had "made some of my favourite records of all time". He said the band was about halfway through, with six songs done, and that the album had "morphed into something else" from the band's early description of it as "disco heartbreak". According to Okereke, the band recorded the album in late 2025 at Horn's "massive house in Belsize Park, which has a basement studio". It is the first Bloc Party album made by the line-up of Okereke, guitarist Russell Lissack, drummer Louise Bartle, and bassist Harry Deacon.

== Composition ==
Anatomy of a Brief Romance recounts a single relationship in chronological order across its 14 songs, from first sight through the break-up and its aftermath. The romance began after Okereke's previous relationship of more than a decade ended. He described the record as a narrative album intended to be heard from start to finish. Reviewers for Clash and MusicOMH treated it as a concept album, while Under the Radar's reviewer was less certain, noting that several songs stood on their own outside the story.

The opening track, "22.01.22", takes its title from the date Okereke first saw his future partner at a gym, although the two did not speak until about a year later. The next few songs capture the early excitement of the romance. "Pigwig" is named after Okereke's pet name in the relationship, borrowed from a Beatrix Potter character. Jealousy and doubt enter with "Muscleworks" and "Clark Kent". The latter uses Superman's secret identity as a metaphor for a partner concealing who he is. "Worst Birthday Ever", about a disastrous meeting with the partner's family, marks the turn towards the break-up. The remaining songs deal with its aftermath. The closing track, "Eulogy", returns to the gym where the story began. Okereke addresses his partner as a man throughout, writing openly about a same-sex relationship.

Musically, the album relies more heavily on synthesisers than the band's earlier work and moves away in places from their guitar-driven sound, a shift reviewers attributed to Horn's production. Slant Magazine noted how Lissack's guitar shared space with synthesisers and dance-pop rhythms. "Now We Can't Be Friends" is built on synthesisers. Piano leads "Rotherhithe", whose theatrical quality Clash linked to Okereke's work in musical theatre. Under the Radar heard the influence of New Order in "Eulogy".

"Lagoon Blue" was first recorded in 2023 and was the starting point for the album. Okereke said that it had been written as a joyful song and that, after the relationship ended, he felt he could keep performing it only as one part of the whole story.

== Release and promotion ==
Bloc Party announced Anatomy of a Brief Romance, their seventh studio album and their first since Alpha Games (2022), on 12 May 2026 and released the lead single, "Coming On Strong", the same day. Four further singles preceded the album: "Love Bombs" on 30 June, "Now We Can't Be Friends" on 28 July, "Pigwig" on 18 August, and "Lagoon Blue" on 8 September.

The album was released on 11 September 2026. It was the first album issued by Contagious Ltd, the label set up by Korda Marshall in partnership with Virgin Music Group. To promote the album, the band scheduled seven shows at record shops and associated venues in England between 9 and 17 September. It entered the UK Albums Chart at number six.

== Critical reception ==
Professional ratings
Aggregate scores
Source	Rating
AnyDecentMusic?	4.9/10
Metacritic	53/100
Review scores
Source	Rating
Clash	7/10
MusicOMH	3/5 stars
Paste	D+
Pitchfork	2.0/10
Slant Magazine	3/5 stars
Under the Radar	7/10

Anatomy of a Brief Romance received mixed reviews from critics. At Metacritic, the album has an average score of 53 out of 100 based on 11 reviews, indicating "mixed or average reviews". AnyDecentMusic? gave it an aggregate score of 4.9 out of 10 from 15 reviews.

Some reviews were favourable. Jimi Arundell of Under the Radar concluded that the album was the band's first since Four (2012) on which they had "fully healed and become whole again". Richard Bowes of Clash found some of the lyrics clichéd and the final act self-absorbed, but regarded Okereke's undisguised vulnerability as the album's most distinctive quality. He felt that its unevenness mirrored its subject.

Other reviews were more mixed. Jon Negroni of Slant Magazine credited Horn's polished production with keeping Okereke's diaristic writing from being static, but felt the album dragged when its documentary detail overwhelmed the songwriting. He singled out the closing track, "Eulogy", as its most fully formed song. John Murphy of MusicOMH called the album "a mature and absorbing portrait of heartbreak" and felt Horn's production gave the band's sound a glossy sheen. However, he found some of the lyrics cringeworthy and the album exhausting to hear in one sitting, with its close examination of the relationship verging on self-indulgence.

The album also received some negative reviews. Will Lynch of Pitchfork called it "a new low" for the band, describing its lyrics as trite and the experience they recount as unremarkable. He found little to admire in Horn's production and wrote that the music lacked the energy that once set the band apart from their peers. At best, he considered it conventional, overwrought Britpop. Abby Jones of Paste was similarly critical, writing that Okereke's narrative songwriting made the romance seem unremarkable to anyone but himself and that he showed little introspection about his own part in it. She described the music as an awkward mix of ideas that failed to enliven bland melodies.

== Track listing ==
All lyrics are written by Kele Okereke; all music is composed by Okereke, Louise Bartle, Harry Deacon, and Russell Lissack (except "Lagoon Blue", composed with Daniel Pugsley).

Anatomy of a Brief Romance track listing
No.	Title	Length
1.	"22.01.22"	3:26
2.	"Coming On Strong"	3:08
3.	"Love Bombs"	3:26
4.	"Pigwig"	3:29
5.	"Lagoon Blue"	4:09
6.	"Muscleworks"	3:19
7.	"Clark Kent"	3:59
8.	"Worst Birthday Ever"	2:38
9.	"Not Your Problem"	3:30
10.	"Now We Can't Be Friends"	3:29
11.	"Rotherhithe"	3:41
12.	"Stories"	2:54
13.	"Moving On"	4:02
14.	"Eulogy"	3:43
Total length:		48:53

Digital deluxe bonus tracks
No.	Title	Length
15.	"Coming On Strong" (demo)	2:49
16.	"Muscleworks" (demo)	4:00
17.	"Worst Birthday Ever" (demo)	2:50
Total length:		58:32

== Personnel ==
Credits are adapted from Tidal.

=== Bloc Party ===
- Louise Bartle – drums (all tracks), background vocals (tracks 1, 3–7, 10, 14), percussion (3, 5, 9)
- Harry Deacon – synthesiser (1, 6, 11, 12, 14), glockenspiel (1, 10, 11), bass guitar (2–13), keyboards (3, 10, 13), percussion (9)
- Russell Lissack – electric guitar (all tracks), keyboards (1), programming (3, 4, 6, 10, 13, 14), acoustic guitar (5, 7)
- Kele Okereke – vocals (all tracks), electric guitar (1, 2, 4, 5, 7, 8), keyboards (11, 12, 14)

=== Additional contributors ===
- Trevor Horn – production, mixing (all tracks); keyboards (6, 7)
- Alex McArthur – engineering, mixing (all tracks); programming (10)
- Thomas Briggs – engineering assistance
- Ned Roberts – mixing assistance
- Dick Beetham – mastering
- Alan Clark – string ensemble (1), Hammond organ (2, 5, 10, 11, 13), piano (14)

== Charts ==
Chart performance for Anatomy of a Brief Romance
Chart (2026)	Peak position
Belgian Albums (Ultratop Wallonia)	92
French Physical Albums (SNEP)	71
French Rock & Metal Albums (SNEP)	19
French Rock & Metal Albums (SNEP) Digital deluxe	48
Scottish Albums (Official Charts)	7
Swiss Albums (Schweizer Hitparade)	89
UK Albums (Official Charts)	6
UK Independent Albums (Official Charts)	2
