= Octopus (Bloc Party song) =

Single by Bloc Party

from the album Four
- B-side: "Straight Thru Cru"
- Released: 11 July 2012
- Recorded: 2012
- Genre: Indie rock; dance-punk; post-punk revival
- Length: 3:05
- Label: Frenchkiss
- Songwriters: Russell Lissack; Gordon Moakes; Kele Okereke; Matt Tong
- Producer: Alex Newport

Bloc Party singles chronology
"One More Chance" (2009)	"Octopus" (2012)	"Truth" (2013)

"Octopus" is a song by the British indie rock band Bloc Party, released as the lead single from the band's fourth album Four on 11 July 2012.

== Background ==
"Octopus" was released as the band's first single since "One More Chance", a standalone single released 3 years before in 2009. "Octopus" was also notable as being the band's first single to be released on Frenchkiss Records.

== Reception ==
"Octopus" was well received by critics upon its release. Billboard stated that the track "takes the band back to the earliest days of Silent Alarm" and called the track "pure rock 'n' roll". Metro also noted the band returning to their indie roots, as well as comparing the track's "strong guitar hook and catchy lyrics" to the band's sound on their debut Silent Alarm.

Counteract Magazine wrote that on the song, "Kele's vocals feel freer and less dominating, giving the whole band a chance to loosen up." They also called "Octopus" an "interesting comeback single" and an "exciting preview of what is yet to come."

Pretty Much Amazing blog summed up the song by saying that it "has more pop appeal than it initially lets on. The beguilingly simple call-and-response melody will get stuck in your head with repeat listens."

== Music video ==
=== Development ===
The music video for "Octopus" debuted on 10 July 2012 on Bloc Party's official YouTube page and on their website. The music video was directed by Nova Dando, who also directed the video for "What Did I Do?" by the band's lead singer Kele Okereke.

=== Synopsis ===
Billboard summarised the music video for "Octopus" as "Bloc Party playing the track in an old warehouse while women dance in black leotards, spinning hula hoops and ribbons of primary colors [...] Bright colors flash across the screen, working with both the primary color theme and the beat of the music." They called the video "a fitting complement for the song's simple, driven indie sound."

== Live ==
The song frequently appears in the band's set, and was played extensively on the 2016 Hymns tour. In the live version, they often add the first verse of "I've been Tired" by Pixies.

== Track listing ==
Digital download

1. Octopus – 3:05

7" single

1. Octopus
2. Straight Thru Cru

Digital EP

1. Octopus
2. Straight Thru Cru
3. Octopus (RAC Remix)
4. Octopus (Koreless Remix)

Four More EP (free CD with Musikexpress magazine)

1. Octopus
2. Straight Thru Cru
3. Lean
4. Octopus (Them Jeans Mix)

== Personnel ==
The people involved in the making of "Octopus" are the following:

Bloc Party

- Kele Okereke – lead vocals
- Russell Lissack – lead guitar
- Gordon Moakes – bass guitar, backing vocals
- Matt Tong – drums

Technical Personnel

- Alex Newport – producer, engineer, mixing
- Atsuo Matsumoto – audio engineer [additional]
- Ray Janos – mastering
- Ted Jensen – mastering
- Alex Prieto – mixing [assistant]
- Bloc Party – artwork
