= Ratchet (song) =

Single by Bloc Party

from the album The Nextwave Sessions
- Released: 25 June 2013
- Recorded: 2013
- Genre: Dance-punk; post-punk revival; rap rock; alternative dance
- Length: 3:18
- Label: Frenchkiss
- Songwriters: Russell Lissack; Gordon Moakes; Kele Okereke; Matt Tong
- Producer: Dan Carey

Bloc Party singles chronology
"Truth" (2013)	"Ratchet" (2013)	"The Love Within" (2015)

"Ratchet" is a song by English rock band Bloc Party. The song was released on 25 June 2013 as the lead single from the band's third EP The Nextwave Sessions. The song was given its first radio play by Zane Lowe on BBC Radio 1. A music video for the song was also uploaded to the band's Vevo channel on YouTube on the same day of the song's release. The song was featured in the soundtrack for the video game FIFA 14.

It is the final single released by the band with the original lineup intact, as drummer Matt Tong left the band in 2013 and bassist Gordon Moakes left in 2015. Tong left the band prior to the release of the single but plays on the recording and appears in the video.

== Music video ==
The official music video for the song, lasting three minutes and sixteen seconds, was uploaded on 25 June 2013 to the band's Vevo channel on YouTube. The video, created by English animator Cyriak, features heavily edited footage from past music videos for the songs "Octopus", "Hunting for Witches", "Little Thoughts" and "Helicopter".

== Track listing ==
=== CD ===
CD release
No.	Title	Length
1.	"Ratchet" (Super Clean Edit)	3:18
2.	"Ratchet" (Clean Edit)	3:18

=== Digital download ===
Digital release
No.	Title	Length
1.	"Ratchet"	3:18

== Charts ==
Chart (2013)	Peak position
Australia (ARIA)	96
