= Maddie Jay =

- Born: Madeline Jay Lough; 1995 (age 30–31)
- Origin: Smithers, British Columbia, Canada
- Genres: Indie pop; Dream pop; Bedroom pop; Electronic
- Occupations: Singer; Songwriter; Producer; Multi-instrumentalist
- Years active: 2018–present
- Label: Real Canadian Cheddar
- Website: maddiejaymusic.com

Madeline Jay Lough (born 1995), known professionally as Maddie Jay, is a Canadian singer, songwriter, and producer based in Los Angeles, California. Known for her DIY approach to music-making, she writes, records, produces, and often directs the visual components of her work independently. She began her career as a session and touring bassist before transitioning to solo artistry in 2018. She has toured as a supporting musician for Lorde, Remi Wolf, and Summer Walker, and appeared on the Grammy Award-winning album Boy by RAC.

== Early life ==
Lough was born in 1995 and raised in Smithers, British Columbia, a remote town of approximately 5,000 people in northern Canada. She grew up in a musical family and began studying violin at a young age, learning traditional Canadian fiddle music. By age five she was performing in a 100-person fiddle orchestra.

In 2012, she attended the Berklee Five-Week Music Performance Intensive on scholarship for violin. During that program, she taught herself bass guitar after her ensemble's bassist failed to appear. She auditioned for Berklee College of Music's undergraduate program on bass the following year and was admitted on scholarship, going on to complete a degree in jazz bass performance. While at Berklee, she composed and performed with the group Maddie Jay and the pH Collective.

== Career ==
=== Session and touring musician (2018–present) ===
After graduating, Lough relocated to Los Angeles in 2018 to pursue a career as a session musician. She toured internationally — including dates in China, South America, and Europe — as a bassist for artists including Naia Izumi, Skylar Grey, Emily Warren, Summer Walker, and AlunaGeorge. From 2018 to 2020, she was a member of Winnetka Bowling League, the band led by songwriter and producer Matthew Koma. She appeared in the music video for their single "CVS," which featured a cameo by Hilary Duff. She later toured as a bassist and background vocalist for Remi Wolf and performed bass and background vocals during Lorde's Solar Power Tour, including a headline set at Glastonbury Festival in 2022.

=== Solo career (2020–present) ===
Lough launched her solo project in 2018 and began releasing music in earnest in 2020. Her debut EP Mood Swings quickly accumulated over two million streams on Spotify and received coverage from outlets including TMRW Magazine and Audiofemme. She also appeared on the track "Sweater" from Grammy Award-winning producer RAC's album Boy. In 2019, her "beat videos" — short self-produced clips in which she performed every instrumental part — earned her a place on Mixmag's list of Best Producers on Instagram.

In 2020, she released the single "The Peanut Butter Song," which was covered by Earmilk, who described her sound as marrying "dream-pop with lo-fi hip hop, and 60s pop stylings with surf-rock tones."

Her 2022 single "Gutterball" received coverage from Flood Magazine, which described it as incorporating "UK dance music and intergalactic pop," and was also featured by Los Angeles public radio station KCRW.

In June 2021, her single "Spiral" from the CMYK EP was featured on NPR's All Songs Considered by host Bob Boilen, who described her sound as shaped by "old Casio keyboards, cassette recorders and other toy instruments." "Spiral" was also included on Boilen's Top 100 Songs of 2021 list at number 99.

In January 2025, she released her debut full-length album I Can Change Your Mind on her own label, Real Canadian Cheddar. The album was reviewed by Grimy Goods, which described it as evidence of "a career on a steady climb," praising her production and noting the record marked her first work with significant outside collaborators. American Songwriter also covered her work around this period.

In 2025, she was featured on CBC Radio's Q, where she discussed her upbringing in northern British Columbia and her path into music.

== Discography ==
=== Albums ===
| Year | Title | Label |
|---|---|---|
| 2025 | I Can Change Your Mind | Real Canadian Cheddar |

=== Extended plays ===
| Year | Title |
|---|---|
| 2020 | Mood Swings |
| 2021 | CMYK |

=== I Can Change Your Mind track listing ===
| # | Title |
|---|---|
| 1 | "An Attempt At Advice" |
| 2 | "Name Your Price" |
| 3 | "Stop Me If I've Told You This Story" |
| 4 | "Eckhaus Latta" |
| 5 | "The Show" |
| 6 | "Chemical" |
| 7 | "Hot Suburban" |
| 8 | "Please Hold!" |
| 9 | "Every Little Thing" (feat. Chase Ceglie) |
| 10 | "lovelost" |
| 11 | "11th Avenue" |
| 12 | "I'm The Leader" |

=== Selected singles ===
- "The Peanut Butter Song" (2020)
- "Undertow" (2021)
- "Gutterball" (2022)
- "Name Your Price" (2025)
- "Every Little Thing" (feat. Chase Ceglie) (2025)
- "Eckhaus Latta" (2024)
