= One More Chance (Bloc Party song) =

Single by Bloc Party

from the album Intimacy (2009 re-release only)
- Released: 10 August 2009
- Recorded: April 2009
- Genre: Alternative dance; post-punk revival
- Length: 4:39
- Label: Wichita
- Songwriters: Russell Lissack; Kele Okereke
- Producer: Jacknife Lee

Bloc Party singles chronology
"Signs (Armand van Helden remix)" (2009)	"One More Chance" (2009)	"Octopus" (2012)

"One More Chance" is a 2009 single by British band Bloc Party. It was released on 10 August 2009.

The song was released in order to coincide with the band's 'Bloctober' tour, and the song received its first radio play on 18 June 2009 on Zane Lowe's BBC Radio 1 show.

The music video for the song was first released publicly on the official MTV site in July 2009.

The single debuted at 15 in the UK Singles Chart after its first week of release. Originally released as a stand-alone single, it was included as one of three extra tracks on the 2009 re-release of their 2008 album Intimacy.

== Track listing ==
iTunes download

1. One More Chance
2. One More Chance (Instrumental)
3. Zephyrus (Holy Fuck Remix)

7" single
Side A

1. One More Chance

Side B

1. Zephyrus (Holy Fuck Remix)

12" single
Side A

1. One More Chance (extended mix)
2. One More Chance (Tiësto Remix)

Side B

1. One More Chance (Todd Terry's Inhouse Mix)
2. One More Chance (Heartbreak Remix)

== Personnel ==
- Kele Okereke - lead vocals, rhythm guitar
- Russell Lissack - lead guitar
- Gordon Moakes - bass, keyboards, vocal effects
- Matt Tong - drum machine

== Charts ==
Chart (2009)	Peak position
Australian ARIA Singles Chart	61
Belgian Ultratop 50 Chart (Flanders)	27
UK Dance Chart	1
UK Singles Chart	15
