= Henrick =

Henrick is a surname. Notable people with the surname include:

- Katie Henrick (born 1980), English snooker and pool player
- Richard P. Henrick (born 1951), American novelist and screenwriter
- Ross Henrick (1954–2005), Australian rugby league player

== See also ==
- Henric
- Henricks
