= Hymns (Bloc Party album) =

Studio album by Bloc Party
- Released: 29 January 2016
- Recorded: March – August 2015
- Studios: Lynchmob Studios (London, England)
- Genres: Alternative dance; indie rock
- Length: 47:37 (standard edition); 65:01 (deluxe edition); 51:01 (vinyl edition)
- Labels: BMG; Infectious (UK); Vagrant (US); Dew Process (AUS)
- Producers: Tim Bran; Roy Kerr

Bloc Party chronology
The Nextwave Sessions (2013)	Hymns (2016)	Alpha Games (2022)

Singles from Hymns
- 1. "The Love Within" Released: 9 October 2015; 2. "The Good News" Released: 2 December 2015; 3. "Virtue" Released: 13 January 2016

Hymns is the fifth studio album by English indie rock band Bloc Party. It was released worldwide in January 2016 on BMG. The album was recorded between March and August 2015 at Lynchmob Studios in London, following a hiatus during which Matt Tong and Gordon Moakes departed the band. It is the first album to feature new band member Justin Harris on bass and keyboards. The songs "The Love Within", "The Good News", and "Virtue" were released as singles.

Musically, Hymns was inspired by many sources including rhythm and blues and gospel. It focuses more on electronic music compared to the album's predecessor, Four (2012), which featured a return to Bloc Party's rock style after experimentation with electronic music on their third studio album, Intimacy (2008). Upon release, the album received generally mixed reviews from critics; reviewers focused on the "subdued" nature of the album, with others noting the more spiritual themes in its lyrics.

== Background and recording ==
During the band's 2013 summer tour, drummer Matt Tong left the band. Guitarist Russell Lissack told Canadian newspaper the National Post that the band were planning to take an indefinite hiatus following their appearance at the Latitude Festival on 19 July 2013. That October, Kele assembled a DJ Mix for !K7's Tapes mix series, released under the Bloc Party name. In September 2014, Okereke stated that Bloc Party were working on a fifth album. In March 2015, bassist Gordon Moakes tweeted he had parted ways with Bloc Party.

Bloc Party unveiled their new line-up at two intimate gigs in the Los Angeles area during August 2015, and following these performances, subheadlined FYF Fest. At these shows, the band confirmed that they had finished recording their next album. The shows marked the live debut for two new band members: bassist Justin Harris of Portland indie rock outfit Menomena, who had previously opened several Bloc Party US tour dates in April 2009; and otherwise-unknown drummer Louise Bartle. These shows also included the first performances of three new songs—"Eden", "Exes" and "The Good News"—two of which would ultimately end up on Hymns.

In a performance at Maida Vale, Bloc Party performed "The Good News" and "Exes"; hours later, "The Love Within" was featured as "Hottest Record in the World" by Annie Mac on BBC Radio 1. Okereke revealed the album's title as Hymns. The album's release was later confirmed on social media as being 29 January 2016. The album was produced by Tim Bran and Roy Kerr, and mixed by David Wrench. According to Lissack, the album's recording "was all done in a studio in north-west London, which was next to a gigantic graveyard".

== Composition ==
I'm a big fan of synths but I didn't play any on this record. Pushing my pedal board to the limit!

— Lead guitarist Lissack confirming he used his instrument to create non-rock sounds,

Hymns is aligned with the alternative dance and electronic music influences demonstrated in Okereke's solo material and the music Lissack and he had listened to since making Four. In addition, according to the band members and affirmed by DJ John Kennedy during a track by track rundown, it also shows their indie rock side but a "more stripped back" version informed by different subgenres than previously, including blues rock and gospel rock. According to critic Mark Beaumont, Lissack's guitar work is often reminiscent of shoegaze, a new style for him which is typified by significant use of distortion, feedback and the blurring of parts into indistinguishable "walls of sound".

Hymns is inspired by various sources, including the albums Spirit of Eden by Talk Talk and A Love Supreme by John Coltrane, as well as Donna Summer's R&B song "State of Independence" and The Consolers' gospel track "May the Work I’ve Done Speak for Me." The Songs of Innocence and of Experience illustrated poems by William Blake, especially "Laughing Song", provided inspiration for the lyrics. Okereke visited his parents' house prior to recording and found various hymns and religious memorabilia from his youth and used these to make a spiritual, meditative album. For example, "Only He Can Heal Me" is reflective of the Hebrew music hymn "Shalom Chaverin". Okereke also learned to play the electric piano for the album, specifically on "So Real", while new member Harris provided a wider range of playing as a multi-instrumentalist.

== Critical reception ==
Professional ratings
Aggregate scores
Source	Rating
Metacritic	55/100
Review scores
Source	Rating
AllMusic	3/5 stars
Drowned in Sound	3/10
Entertainment Weekly	A−
The Guardian	4/5 stars
Mojo	3/5 stars
NME	4/5 stars
Pitchfork	5.0/10
Q	3/5 stars
The Skinny	2/5 stars
Under the Radar	4/10

Hymns received mixed reviews from critics. While several criticised the album's subdued nature in comparison to earlier albums, others viewed the album as one of the strongest of the band's career. On Metacritic, the album holds an average critic score of 55/100 based on 29 reviews indicating mixed reviews.

In a positive review, NME stated that "Hymns finds a fully-in-control Okereke, still tangled in the electronics of his solo albums fusing with Russell Lissack’s spectral shoegaze guitars to steer one of the century’s most pioneering underground bands into more mature and absorbing, if murkier, waters. A bewitching new Bloc Party has risen from the grave. Praise be." Giving the album a 4/5 score, The Guardian stated that "There’s a clue to Bloc Party’s radical new direction in the album title: lyrically, Hymns is a turn for the more spiritual. Out goes the angst; in come song titles such as 'Only He Can Heal Me' and an evangelical joyousness on the likes of 'The Good News' (although frontman Kele Okereke has denied the new material is explicitly religious). There is a parallel shift musically too. “Rock’n’roll has got so old/ Just give me neo-soul,” sings Okereke on 'Into the Earth', which is a fair description of the direction of travel. Where once Russell Lissack's stinging guitar defined their sound, it now caresses, complementing his bandmates rather than fighting them. It's a brave and successful reinvention."

Drowned In Sound gave the album a negative review, "Bloc Party’s fifth album isn’t beyond salvation. It is merely crushingly beige, devoid of a crucial spark that might suggest that they aren’t a spent force. “These words will fall short, but I must try”, sighs Okereke on 'Exes', a maudlin apology to those he has let down in life. There is a lot to be said for persistence, but one must know when to walk away, too." Though some praise was reserved for the track "Different Drugs". The Skinny also gave a mixed review writing that "It's hard to know where to start with the 2015 version of Bloc Party. A far cry from the band that crafted one of this generation's finest debut records in Silent Alarm, they're consistently – and often unfavourably – associated with the period of time when they sat at the forefront of the UK indie scene. Whether that's fair or not is perhaps a conversation for another time, but whichever way you choose to explore and consume their fifth outing, it seems that something is amiss. Lead track 'The Love Within' opens the record and remains a bizarre mess; Kele Okereke's distinct vocal parting for a mostly one-note synth line that causes a genuine flinch. All is perhaps not lost: 'Fortress' is a somewhat pretty, minimal electro ballad while 'Different Drugs' speaks for the entire record; flirting with a series of ideas before simply fading out of sight and mind. We expected so much more."

== Track listing ==
All tracks are written by Kele Okereke and Russell Lissack, except where noted.

No.	Title	Writer(s)	Length
1.	"The Love Within"		4:36
2.	"Only He Can Heal Me"		4:04
3.	"So Real"	Okereke, Lissack, Justin Harris	3:23
4.	"The Good News"		3:50
5.	"Fortress"		4:38
6.	"Different Drugs"		5:26
7.	"Into the Earth"		4:00
8.	"My True Name"		5:34
9.	"Virtue"		3:56
10.	"Exes"		4:04
11.	"Living Lux"		4:06
Total length:			47:37

Deluxe edition bonus tracks
No.	Title	Length
12.	"Eden"	4:00
13.	"New Blood"	4:40
14.	"Paraíso"	3:58
15.	"Evening Song"	4:46
Total length:		65:01

Vinyl edition hidden track
No.	Title	Length
16.	"The God Vibration"	2:54

== Personnel ==
Bloc Party

- Kele Okereke – lead vocals, rhythm guitar, electric piano
- Russell Lissack – lead guitar, programming
- Justin Harris – bass guitar, synths, backing vocals

Drummer Louise Bartle had not yet joined the band when the album was recorded although she did provide unlisted vocals.

Other musicians

- Alex Thomas – drums
- Roy Kerr – production
- Tim Bran – production
- David Wrench – mixing
- Max Hayes – engineering (all tracks)
- Ben Jackson – co-engineering (11)
- Nicky Brown – choir member and vocal arranger (2, 4, 10, 14, 15)
- Jesse Grant – choir member (2, 4, 10, 14, 15)
- Geo Gabriel – choir member (2, 4, 10, 14, 15)
- Jermaine Foster – choir member (2, 4, 10, 14, 15)
- Nigel Walton – mastering

Additional personnel

- Sony / ATV Music Publishing (UK) – publishing (all tracks)
- ASCAP – co-publishing (3)
- Tony Perrin at Big Life – management
- Colin Roberts at Big Life – management
- Rachael Wright – polaroids
- Phil Armson at Big Active – design and imagery

== Charts ==
Chart (2016)	Peak position
Australian Albums (ARIA)	15
Austrian Albums (Ö3 Austria)	29
Belgian Albums (Ultratop Flanders)	25
Belgian Albums (Ultratop Wallonia)	39
Dutch Albums (Album Top 100)	78
French Albums (SNEP)	84
German Albums (Offizielle Top 100)	30
Irish Albums (IRMA)	61
Japanese Albums (Oricon)	112
Swiss Albums (Schweizer Hitparade)	38
UK Albums (Official Charts)	12
US Billboard 200	198
US Top Album Sales (Billboard)	93
US Top Alternative Albums (Billboard)	14
US Top Rock Albums (Billboard)	18
