= Thomas S. Henricks =

American academic

Thomas S. Henricks is an American academic who served as the J. Earl Danieley Professor of Sociology and Distinguished University Professor at Elon University. His research focuses on social theory, modernization and change, popular culture, social stratification, race and ethnic relations, and the sociology of play, games and sport.

The son of a college professor and a writer, Henricks grew up in Indianapolis, Indiana and attended North Central College in Naperville, Illinois, where he received his B.A. in sociology and anthropology. After graduating, Henricks worked for two years as a social worker with the Department of Public Aid in Chicago. He then attended the University of Chicago where he received his M.A. and Ph.D. degrees in sociology.

After teaching for a year at the University of Indianapolis, Henricks joined the Elon University faculty in 1977. In 1990, he received the university's Daniels-Danieley Award for Excellence in Teaching. In 1997, he was appointed Elon's first J. Earl Danieley Professor. In fall 2003, Henricks was named Distinguished University Professor. He retired in 2018.

Henricks's books include:

- Play and the Human Condition (2015)
- Selves, Societies, and Emotions: Understanding the Pathways of Experience (2012)
- Play Reconsidered (2006)
- Disputed Pleasures: Sport and Society in Preindustrial England (1991)

Henricks has been noted for his explanations of the role of football in 16th century England.

Henricks also writes a blog titled "The Pathways of Experience” for Psychology Today.
