= Crookram =

Dutch electronic music producer

Crookram (born Chris Angelovski) is an electronic music producer from the Netherlands, known for his extensive use of sampling in downtempo music. Crookram describes his sound as "cinematic, sample-based, downtempo soul music".

== Biography ==
Crookram, whose real name is Chris Angelovski, is a musician from The Hague. In 2006, he was invited by the Hungarian Budabeats label, an internet-only operation, to release music through their website. Crookram had been brought to Budabeat's attention by a Hungarian musician, who had received a favourable review from Crookram via their Myspace page. His first release, 19/76, consisted of five tracks, all downloadable for free. Through Windows (2010) received significant airplay on VPRO's 3VOOR12. Angelovski said much of his inspiration and many of his samples come from his parents' record collection, which contained much 1970s jazzrock and jazz-funk.

== Discography ==
=== Albums ===
- 19/76 (2008)
- Escape, the E.P. (2009)
- Through Windows (2010)
- Butterflies (2017)
- Clouds Are Free (2017)
- Does Love Can Die Instrumentals (2020)

=== Mixtapes ===
- Downtempo Mixtape (2008)
- Debutante, A Sex Tape (2014)
