= Louise Bartle =

British musician (born 1994)

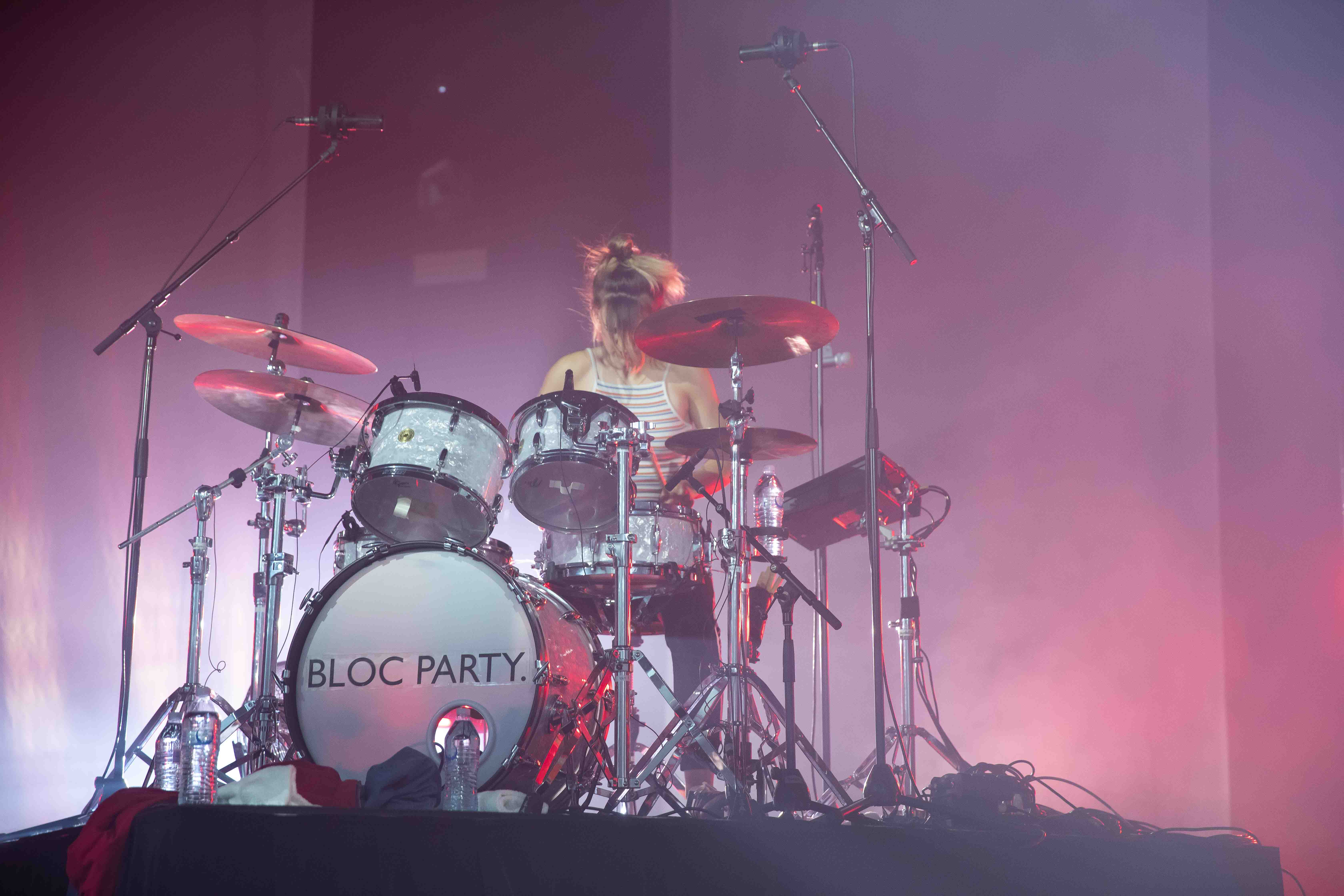
- Bartle performing with Bloc Party in 2018

Background information
- Born: 1994 (age 31–32); London, England
- Origin: London, England
- Genres: Indie rock, pop
- Instruments: Drums, vocals, guitar
- Years active: 2014–present
- Member of: Bloc Party, Novacub

Louise Bartle (born 1994) is a British musician. She is the drummer of Bloc Party, having joined the band in 2015. She founded Novacub in 2018, originally as a band including Bloc Party guitarist Russell Lissack, but since 2022 as a solo project.

== Early life ==
Bartle is from southwest London. She began playing the guitar, inspired by her father, and took up drums at 13. She graduated with a degree in popular music performance from the Institute of Contemporary Music Performance in 2014. She acted as the character O'Malley in "Rich", an episode of the sixth series of Skins, and was a drumming double in Toast of London. Her character on Skins was a drummer whose only spoken line was an obscene threat with drumsticks.

== Career ==
Bartle was a drummer in backing bands for Eliza Doolittle and Selena Gomez. She joined Bloc Party in 2015, succeeding Matt Tong as their drummer; she had barely listened to the band before. She had three months to learn their back catalogue. Jamie Milton of DIY noted that she had a different style to Tong's rapid and energetic drumming. Bartle joined the band after the recording of the album Hymns, released in 2016, and did not play on an album until Alpha Games in 2022.

In 2018, Bartle founded Novacub as lead vocalist and guitarist alongside Bloc Party guitarist Russell Lissack. They were joined by drummer Tony Alda and Iona Thomas on bass guitar and harp. In 2022, Novacub was reformed as Bartle's solo project, with Lissack still a writer and musician. The 2023 song "This Is Forever" is about her breakup with her girlfriend.

== Discography ==
with Bloc Party

- Alpha Games (2022)
- Anatomy of a Brief Romance (2026)

with Novacub

- Future Echoes (2019)
- Change Your Mind (2020)
- Fantasies (2021)
- Our Little World (2022)
- Girl Likes Girl (2023)
- Dying to Know (2025)
- Just Not Me (2025)
