= Pin Me Down =

British-American pop/electronica/rock project

- Origin: New York City, United States; London, England
- Genres: Pop, electronica, rock
- Years active: 2007–2010
- Label: Animalized
- Past members: Russell Lissack; Milena Mepris; Alex Elena

Pin Me Down were a pop/electronica/rock side project of guitarist Russell Lissack, of the British band Bloc Party, and guitarist/singer Milena Mepris. The band was managed by Robt Ptak, who had previously worked with Mepris in Ptak's project Artificial Joy. The band made their live debut as a 5–6 piece in May 2008 in London, supporting Yeasayer.

== Pin Me Down (album) ==
Pin Me Down

Studio album by Pin Me Down
- Released: 19 April 2010
- Genres: Indie rock, alternative dance
- Length: 39:20
- Label: Animalized Music
- Producers: Alex Elena; Executive Producer – Robt Ptak; Co producer – Renee Frisch Ptak

Singles from Pin Me Down
- 1. "Cryptic"; 2. "Time Crisis"

On 19 July 2010, the band released their self-titled debut studio album. The album was produced by Alex Elena, who previously played drums with Mepris and manager Ptak's band Artificial Joy. The track "Time Crisis" had previously been released on the band's website at the beginning of the year.

Robert Cooke, writing for Drowned in Sound gave the album a negative review of 3 out of 10, saying that the production was a letdown, and "...fundamentally, the songs just aren't great".

=== Track listing ===
All tracks are written by Pin Me Down.

No.	Title	Length
1.	"Cryptic"	3:51
2.	"Treasure Hunter"	4:06
3.	"Boy Who Cried Wolf"	3:10
4.	"Ticking"	4:05
5.	"Oh My Goddess"	3:03
6.	"Pretty in Pink"	3:18
7.	"Curious"	4:34
8.	"Time Crisis"	3:01
9.	"Meet the Selkirks"	2:42
10.	"Everything Is Sacred"	3:22
11.	"Fight Song"	4:03

== Singles ==
- "Cryptic" (2008)
- "Time Crisis" (2010)
- "Treasure Hunter" (2010)
