= Alpha Games =

Studio album by Bloc Party
- Released: 29 April 2022
- Studio: Konk (London)
- Genres: Post-punk revival; dance-punk
- Length: 39:38
- Labels: BMG; Infectious
- Producers: Nick Launay; Adam Greenspan

Bloc Party chronology
Hymns (2016)	Alpha Games (2022)	Anatomy of a Brief Romance (2026)

Singles from Alpha Games
- 1. "Traps" Released: 23 November 2021; 2. "The Girls Are Fighting" Released: 26 January 2022; 3. "Sex Magik" Released: 25 February 2022; 4. "If We Get Caught" Released: 24 March 2022

Alpha Games is the sixth studio album by English indie rock band Bloc Party, released on 29 April 2022. It is the first studio album by the band since 2016's Hymns. It is the first album with drummer Louise Bartle, who joined the band after drum sessions for Hymns had been completed, and the first to feature significant songwriting input from Bartle and bassist Justin Harris with Hymns having been mostly written by lead singer Kele Okereke and guitarist Russell Lissack. This was Harris' last album with the band before departing in 2023.

== Background and recording ==
Bloc Party released their last studio album, Hymns, in 2016. On 22 January 2020, lead singer Kele Okereke announced on his personal social media accounts that Bloc Party had begun writing a new album in the previous few weeks. On 23 November 2021, they officially announced the album and they released the first single "Traps" the same day. Speaking about "Traps", Okereke said: "From the moment we wrote 'Traps', we knew it had to be the first thing people heard from this album; playing it in soundchecks on our last tour before it was finished and hearing how it sounded in those big rooms and outdoors." The album was released on 29 April 2022. Alpha Games was produced by Nick Launay and Adam Greenspan and released under the record label Infectious Music/BMG Rights Management. A second single "The Girls Are Fighting" was released on 26 January 2022 and its music video was released on 28 January. On 25 February 2022, the third single "Sex Magik" was released. A fourth single "If We Get Caught" was released on 24 March 2022.

The band toured the UK and Europe in May 2022 in support of the album. On 29 July, Bloc Party released a deluxe edition entitled Alpha Games (Deluxe) which featured three new songs: "Acting Out", "The Robot and the Psychonaut", and "Strut".

== Critical reception ==
Professional ratings
Aggregate scores
Source	Rating
Metacritic	65/100
Review scores
Source	Rating
AllMusic	3.5/5 stars
The A.V. Club	C+
Clash	8/10
MusicOMH	3.5/5 stars
Pitchfork	5.2/10
PopMatters	8/10
Spin	(favorable)
The Telegraph	3/5 stars

Alpha Games was met with generally favorable reviews. At Metacritic, which assigns a normalized rating out of 100 to reviews from professional publications, the album received an average score of 65, based on 11 reviews.

In a positive review for Clash, Laviea Thomas wrote that the album was "an exciting return with addictive hooks and array of infectious album stand outs". PopMatters' Peter Piatkowski, similarly, called the album "a superb return to form" in his review, adding: "So many of Alpha Games' fiery numbers make the record an exciting listen, but the thoughtful, pensive moments lift the album to something genuinely special." More mixed reviews came from Pitchfork and The Telegraph. Writing for the former, Patrick Lyons criticised the band for their lack of imagination: "A devoted fan with a magnifying glass could identify every trick Alpha Games lifts from Silent Alarm," he wrote. Lyons did, however, praise the drumming and vocal work of Bartle, describing her contributions as "a new trick in Bloc Party's repertoire" and responsible for "the album's best hooks". Writing for the latter, meanwhile, Neil McCormick noted that the band sounded "strangely ambivalent" on the album, adding that they seemed "trapped between the visceral thrill of lean, modern guitar music and their doubts about its form and function".

== Track listing ==
All tracks are written by Justin Harris, Kele Okereke, Russell Lissack, and Louise Bartle.

Alpha Games track listing
No.	Title	Length
1.	"Day Drinker"	3:13
2.	"Traps"	2:54
3.	"You Should Know the Truth"	3:01
4.	"Callum Is a Snake"	1:59
5.	"Rough Justice"	3:13
6.	"The Girls Are Fighting"	3:55
7.	"Of Things Yet to Come"	4:03
8.	"Sex Magik"	3:26
9.	"By Any Means Necessary"	2:49
10.	"In Situ"	2:55
11.	"If We Get Caught"	3:14
12.	"The Peace Offering"	4:51
Total length:		39:38

Deluxe edition bonus tracks
No.	Title	Length
13.	"Acting Out"	2:47
14.	"The Robot and the Psychonaut"	4:05
15.	"Strut"	3:25
Total length:		49:57

== Personnel ==
Credits are adapted from the album's liner notes.

=== Bloc Party ===
- Kele Okereke – vocals, guitars
- Russell Lissack – guitars
- Louise Bartle – drums, percussion, backing vocals
- Justin Harris – bass guitar, synthesiser, backing vocals

=== Additional personnel ===
- Nick Launay – production, mixing, engineering
- Adam "Atom" Greenspan – production, mixing, engineering
- George Chung – engineering assistance
- Simon Jayes – drum technician
- John Russell – drum technician
- Bernie Grundman – mastering
- Samantha Meadows – layout

== Charts ==
Chart performance for Alpha Games
Chart (2022)	Peak position
Belgian Albums (Ultratop Flanders)	91
Belgian Albums (Ultratop Wallonia)	39
French Albums (SNEP)	125
German Albums (Offizielle Top 100)	17
Scottish Albums (Official Charts)	5
Swiss Albums (Schweizer Hitparade)	41
UK Albums (Official Charts)	7
UK Independent Albums (Official Charts)	2
US Top Album Sales (Billboard)	57
