= Natal Drums =

British musical instrument company

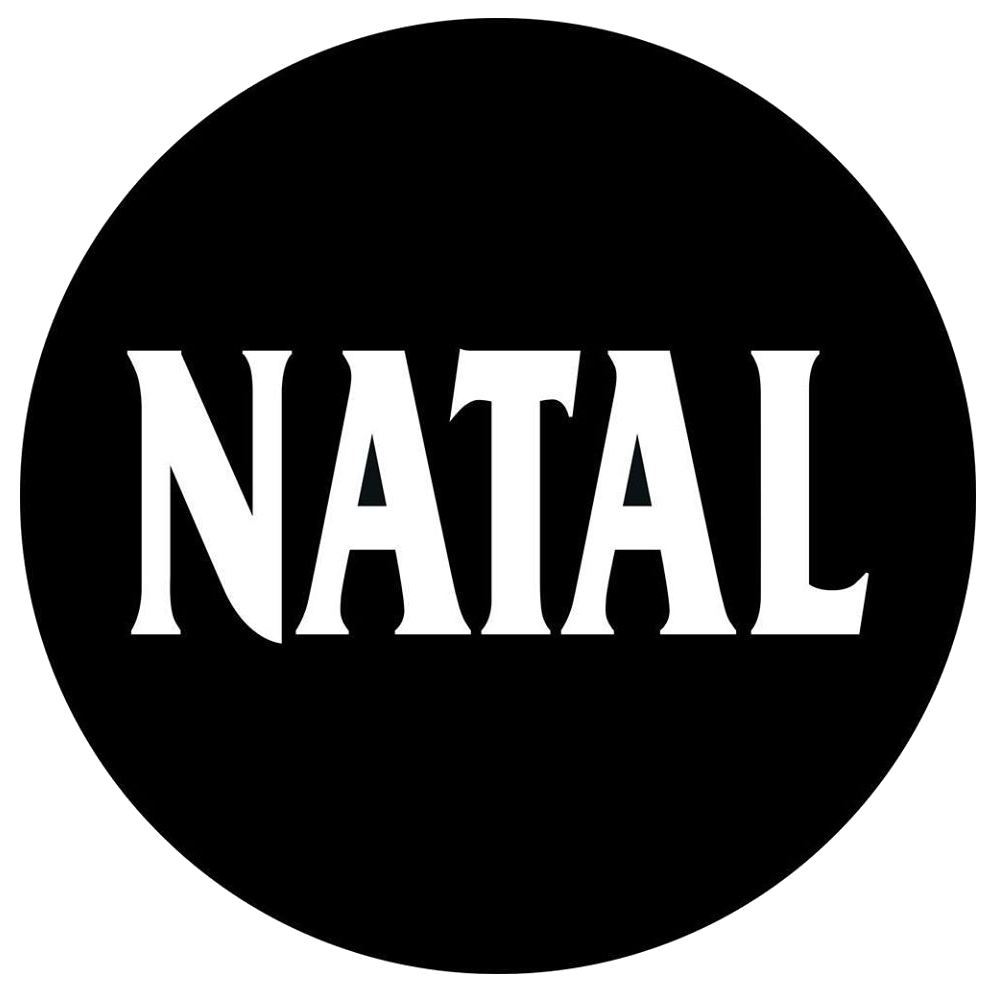
- Type: Subsidiary
- Industry: Musical instruments
- Founded: 1958; 68 years ago
- Founder: Alan Sharp
- Fate: Acquired by Marshall in 2010
- Headquarters: Bletchley, England
- Products: Drum kits, hardware, bongo drums, congas, tambourines, cowbells, bar chimes
- Parent: Marshall

Natal Drums (in past known as Natal Percussion Company) is a British musical instrument manufacturing company based in Bletchley, England. The name is a portmanteau of the first names of the company founder and his wife, NATalie and ALan.

In 2010 the company was purchased by Marshall Amplification. Current line of Natal products include drum kits, hardware, and other percussion instruments such as bongo drums, congas, tambourines, cowbells and bar chimes.

== History ==
Natal was established in 1958, creating fibreglass Latin percussion that has been used by the likes of Led Zeppelin, The Rolling Stones and Santana.

Natal had great success in the late 1960s thanks to its revolutionary fiberglass congas that was used by bands like Santana, T. Rex, Led Zeppelin, Fleetwood Mac, Deep Purple and The Rolling Stones. In 2010, Natal was acquired by Marshall, which announced the purchase at the 2010 Musikmesse Exhibition.

== Artists ==
Some musicians that use/have used Natal drums are:

- Andy Treacey
- Ashley Green
- Ash Soan
- Blue Devils Drum and Bugle Corps
- Brandon Deamer
- Brian Downey
- Cass Browne
- Charlie Morgan
- Chris Turner
- Claudia "Killer" Lippmann
- Daniel Chantrey
- Daniel Schild
- Darrin Mooney
- Dhani Mansworth
- DJ Bonebrake
- Gary Walmsley
- Ian Matthews
- Jack Stephens
- Jamiel Blake
- Jano Rix
- John Coghlan
- Julien Audigier
- Louise Bartle
- Martin "Frosty" Beedle (Cutting Crew, Lifesigns)
- Martin Osborne (Shadow Warriors)
- Martin Ranscombe
- Matt Brobin
- Matt Donnelly
- Mohktar Samba
- Nate Arling
- Nick Kilroe
- Pascal Bianco
- Paul Hose
- Raymond Hearne
- Richard Kensington
- Ritch Battersby
- Robb Reiner
- Russell Gilbrook
- Sean Moore
- Simon Dawson (Iron Maiden)
- Simon Finley
- Steve Grantley
- Steve Lamos
- Sudha Kheterpal
- Swiss Chris
- The Peggies
