= Bloc Party =

English indie rock band

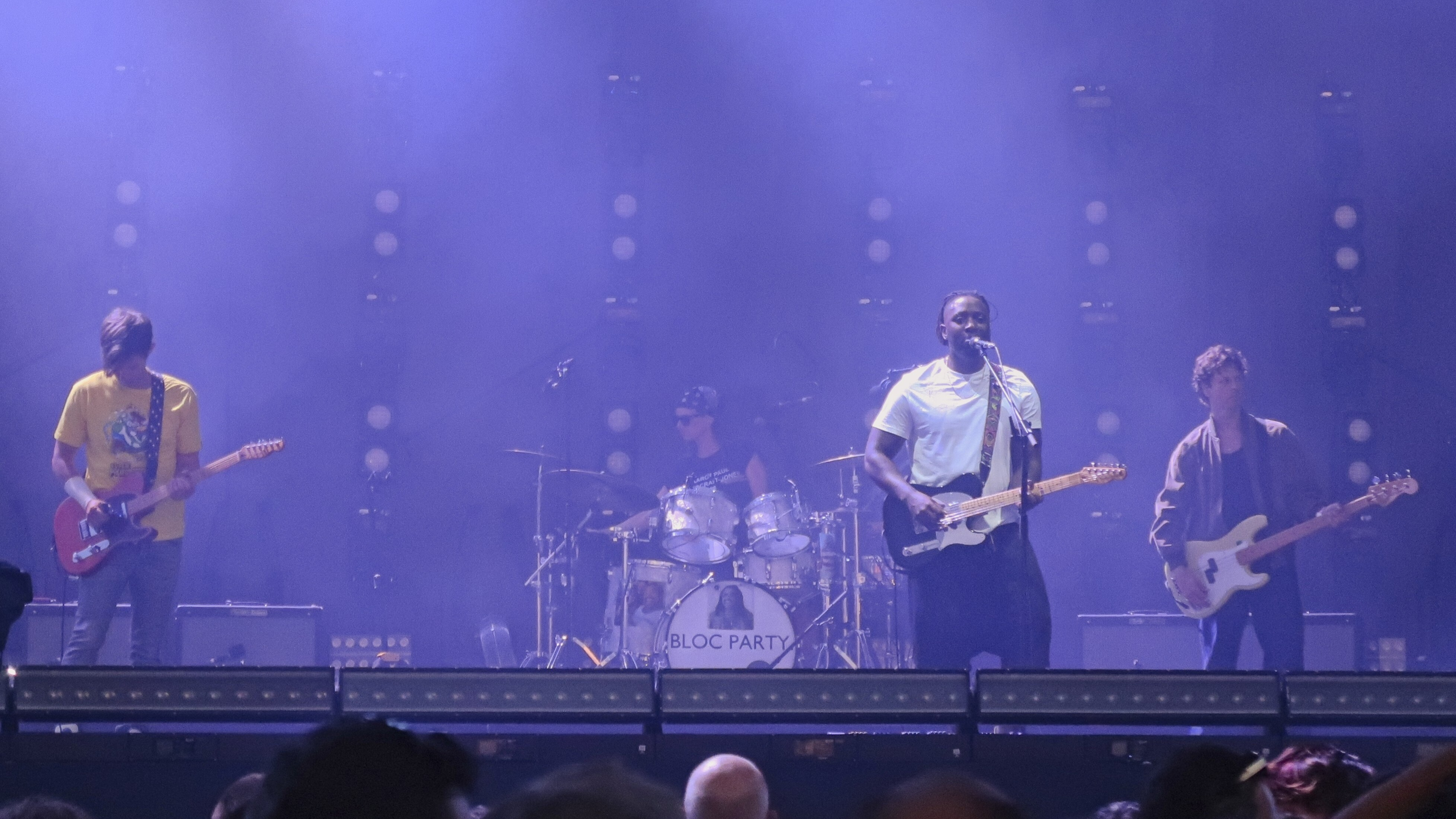
- Bloc Party performing live in 2025. From Left to Right: Lissack, Bartle, Okereke and Deacon

Background information
- Origin: London, England
- Genres: Indie rock; post-punk revival; alternative dance; dance-punk; alternative rock; art punk
- Years active: 2003–present
- Labels: BMG; Wichita; Frenchkiss; Atlantic; Infectious; Vagrant; Transgressive; Trash Aesthetics; Vice; Arts & Crafts; Dim Mak; Dew Process
- Spinoffs: Pin Me Down; Young Legionnaire; Novacub; The None; Wet Market; Algiers
- Members: Kele Okereke; Russell Lissack; Louise Bartle; Harry Deacon
- Past members: Gordon Moakes; Matt Tong; Sarah Jones; Justin Harris; Daniel Pugsley
- Website: blocparty.com

Bloc Party are an English rock band that was formed in London in 1999 by co-founders Kele Okereke (lead vocals, rhythm guitar, piano, sampler) and Russell Lissack (lead guitar). Their first four albums all featured Gordon Moakes (bass, keyboards) and Matt Tong (drums), who have since left the band. Their current lineup also contains Louise Bartle (drums, percussion) and Harry Deacon (bass, synthesizer).

Upon their formation at the 1999 Reading Festival by Okereke and Lissack, the band went through a variety of names before settling on Bloc Party in 2003. Moakes joined the band after answering an advert in NME magazine, while Tong was picked via an audition. Bloc Party got their break by giving BBC Radio 1 DJ Steve Lamacq and Franz Ferdinand's Alex Kapranos a copy of their demo "She's Hearing Voices".

In February 2005, the band released their debut album Silent Alarm. It was critically acclaimed, and was named Indie Album of the Year at the 2006 PLUG Awards and the NME Album Of The Year – which both honour indie music. That year, the record was also certified platinum in Britain. The band built on this success in 2007 with the release of their second studio album, A Weekend in the City, which reached a peak of number two in the UK Albums Chart and number twelve on the Billboard 200. In August 2008, Bloc Party released their third studio record, Intimacy, which entered the UK Albums Chart at number eight and number eighteen on the Billboard 200.

The band went on a hiatus in October 2009 to focus on side projects. They reunited in September 2011, and shortly thereafter released their fourth album, Four, which entered the UK Albums Chart at number three. In August 2013, Bloc Party released their third EP titled The Nextwave Sessions; the band then began a second hiatus following the departure of Tong, with Moakes following soon after. The band's fifth studio album, Hymns, was the first to involve Bartle and Justin Harris (bass); it was released on 29 January 2016. Their sixth studio album, Alpha Games, was released on 29 April 2022, and their fourth EP The High Life was released the following year. Deacon joined the band in 2023, following the release of The High Life. A seventh album, Anatomy of a Brief Romance, was released in September 2026.

Bloc Party have sold over 3 million albums worldwide, and are regarded as one of the key English bands in the post-punk revival of the 2000s. Pitchfork has described the band as "rhythmically vital and melodically sharp," noting Silent Alarm as one of the best albums of the decade.

== History ==
=== Formation and rising popularity (1999–2004) ===
Russell Lissack and Kele Okereke first met in 1998 in London. Lissack had attended Bancroft's School, while Okereke attended Ilford County High School, then Trinity Catholic High School, Woodford Green for sixth form. They bumped into each other again in 1999 at Reading Festival and decided to form a band. Bassist Gordon Moakes joined after answering an advert in NME, and drummer Matt Tong joined after an audition. After going through a variety of names, such as Union, The Angel Range, and Diet, the band settled on Bloc Party in September 2003, a play on block party. The band has said that the name was not intended to be an allusion to the Soviet Bloc or the Canadian political party Bloc Québécois. However, Moakes said on the group's official Internet forum that it was more a merging of the eastern "Blocs" and the western "parties", in the political sense. He also notes that the name was not explicitly driven by politics, but rather it "looked, sounded, seemed fine so we went with it."

"Banquet"
"Banquet" was Bloc Party's first and only release by Moshi Moshi, and is typical of their early indie rock style.

In November 2003, Bloc Party had their track "The Marshals Are Dead" featured on a compilation CD called The New Cross released by Angular Recording Corporation. They then released their debut single "She's Hearing Voices" on the then fledgling record label Trash Aesthetics. Also in 2003 Bloc Party personally mailed Steve Aoki a 7-inch of the track "She's Hearing Voices" and signed to Dim Mak shortly thereafter. Dim Mak teamed up with VICE, a subsidiary of Atlantic Records, and entered a major label deal for the first time. Dim Mak and Atlantic later released Bloc Party's critically acclaimed and commercially successful debut album, Silent Alarm, in 2005. The band got their break after Okereke went to a Franz Ferdinand concert in 2003, and gave a copy of "She's Hearing Voices" to both lead singer Alex Kapranos and BBC Radio 1 DJ Steve Lamacq. Lamacq subsequently played the song on his radio show, labelling the track "genius", and invited them to record a live session for the show. The buzz generated off the back of the single led to another release, "Banquet/Staying Fat", this time through Moshi Moshi Records, and to the eventual signing with independent label Wichita Recordings in April 2004.

=== Silent Alarm (2004–2006) ===
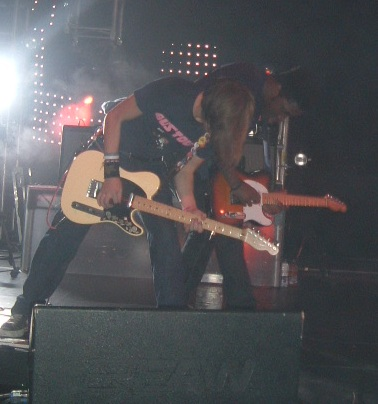
Bloc Party's Lissack and Okereke on stage in Cardiff in October 2005

Silent Alarm was released in February 2005 and was met with universal critical acclaim. It was voted 'Album of the Year' for 2005 by NME, and reached number 3 on the UK Albums Chart before being certified platinum. The first single from the album, "So Here We Are/Positive Tension", made the top 5 on the UK Top 40 chart. Further singles "Banquet" (which reached number 13 in NME's 'Top 50 Singles of 2005'), "Helicopter", and "Pioneers", whilst failing to repeat this success, still managed to reach the UK top 20. The animated video for "Pioneers," made by the Shoreditch-based Minivegas design agency, was top of the NME video charts for four weeks. NME tagged them as "art-rock" at that time but the band felt it was too limited.

The band received positive reviews from critics in the United States and they toured there heavily in the 18 months that followed the release of Silent Alarm. In early 2006, they finished their tour with sold-out shows in Los Angeles, Miami and Berkeley. The album went on to sell more than 350,000 copies in North America and over a million worldwide. After this success, the established electronic group, The Chemical Brothers, soon collaborated with Okereke for "Believe", a track on their Push the Button album. An album of remixes of tracks from Silent Alarm had also been released at the end of August 2005 in the UK. This remix album, entitled Silent Alarm Remixed, retained the album's original track list and includes remixes from the likes of Ladytron, M83, Death from Above 1979, Four Tet, and Mogwai.

During July 2005, Bloc Party recorded two new tracks with Silent Alarm producer Paul Epworth. The songs were released as a single with a B-side, titled "Two More Years", to coincide with the band's October 2005 UK tour. The tour was also accompanied by a re-issue of Silent Alarm, which included "Two More Years" and former single "Little Thoughts" as bonus tracks. A remix of "Banquet" by The Streets, as well as a music video for the song, were included in the "Two More Years" single. Bloc Party also contributed the track "The Present" to the Help!: A Day in the Life compilation, the profits of which benefited the War Child charity.

=== A Weekend in the City (2006–2008) ===
Bloc Party's second album, A Weekend in the City, was produced by Garret "Jacknife" Lee. It was released in February 2007, although it was leaked in November 2006. It became available for download on the UK iTunes Store before the physical release, and reached the number 2 spot on the UK Albums Chart. The album also reached number 2 on the Australian and Belgian charts, and debuted at number 12 in the Billboard 200, with 48,000 copies sold. The first single, "The Prayer", was released on 29 January, and became the band's highest charting single in the British Top 40, reaching number 4. In the buildup to the release of the album, BBC Radio 1 DJ Zane Lowe aired a live set by the band from Maida Vale studios on 30 January 2007, featuring a mix of old and new songs. On 1 February 2007, A Weekend in the City was made available to listen to for free through Bloc Party's official MySpace page.

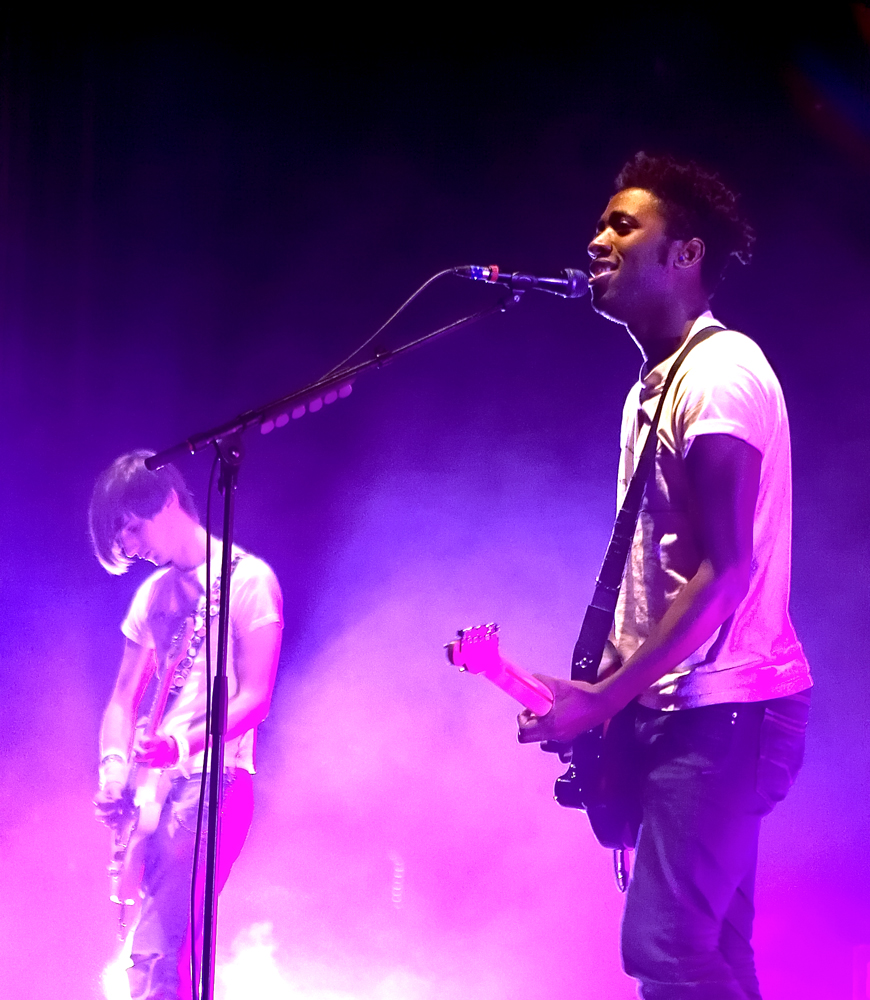
Bloc Party at The Brixton Academy, London, UK. October 2005.

The next single, "I Still Remember", was Bloc Party's highest charting American single, peaking at number 24 on the Modern Rock Chart. The band released their third single, "Hunting for Witches", with an accompanying video clip in August 2007. The single became their only ARIA Chart entry, peaking at number 20. In October 2007, it was announced that Bloc Party would release a new single, "Flux", on 13 November—ahead of their end of year gigs. The electronic song, also produced by Jacknife Lee, was very different from previous singles released by the band.

The band's first gig following the release of A Weekend in the City was on 5 February 2007, in Reading, and was broadcast live on BBC 6 Music. On 20 May 2007, Bloc Party headlined on the In New Music We Trust stage at the BBC Radio 1 Big Weekend in Preston. They also performed at the UK leg of Live Earth on 7 July 2007 at Wembley Stadium. Furthermore, the band played sets at T in the Park and Oxegen 07 that same weekend, as well as Glastonbury and the Reading and Leeds Festivals later in 2007. Bloc Party announced a tour of Australia and New Zealand in August 2007, which would include a special appearance at the Splendour in the Grass Festival on 5 August. On 17 September 2007, they recorded a set for the PBS show Austin City Limits a day after playing at the Austin City Limits Music Festival. On 27 October, the band performed a set at London's The Roundhouse with the Exmoor Singers, a London-based choir, as part of the BBC Electric Proms. The set included songs from both Silent Alarm and A Weekend in the City along with the first British live performance of "Flux".

=== Intimacy (2008–2009) ===
"Mercury" was released as the first single from Bloc Party's third album in August 2008. Again produced by Jacknife Lee and Paul Epworth, Intimacy was rush-released later that month, with the album available to download 3 days after an announcement in August 2008. Later in the month the band played second on the bill at the Reading and Leeds Festivals before headlining the Hydro Connect Music Festival in Argyll, Scotland.

During the autumn of 2008, the band went on a short tour of North America, which included an appearance at the Virgin Festival in Toronto, as well as the band's first ever American college show at Syracuse University and an appearance at the 2008 edition of MTV Video Music Brazil, their first concert in South America, which was negatively received due to the band choosing to mime their performance. They made their live return to the UK on 30 September 2008 with a special gig in London as part of Q Awards: The Gigs. They also played the Glasgow date of MTV2's and Topman's "Gonzo on Tour" on 19 October 2008. A follow-up single, "Talons" was released in October 2008. The song was not part of the pre-order album, but did feature on the full album CD release and was made freely available to people who already purchased the download-only album. An album of remixes of all tracks on Intimacy, Intimacy Remixed, was released in May 2009. The band undertook their first UK tour since December 2007 in October 2009, dubbing it "Bloctober".

=== One More Chance and hiatus (2009–2011) ===
In July 2009, Okereke stated that the band did not have a current recording contract and had no obligation or pressure to release a new album in the foreseeable future; he went on to suggest that the release of a fourth album was on an indefinite timescale. A new single, "One More Chance", was released in August 2009. The song did not appear on Intimacy and was produced by Jacknife Lee. After this, the group went on a hiatus, with the members unsure as to whether they would carry on.

During this period of hiatus Lissack revived his project Pin Me Down and joined the live line-up of Irish rock-band Ash as guitarist and synthesiser player on their touring for the A–Z Series. Moakes formed the group Young Legionnaire with Paul Mullen, vocalist & guitarist of The Automatic, and William Bowerman, drummer for La Roux, releasing a single, "Colossus" in August 2010. Okereke released a solo album, The Boxer, in June 2010. Produced by Hudson Mohawke and XXXChange, its release was preceded by the single "Tenderoni". Rumours throughout 2011 suggested Okereke had left the group to focus on solo work, though these were denied by other band members.

=== Four and The Nextwave Sessions (2011–2013) ===
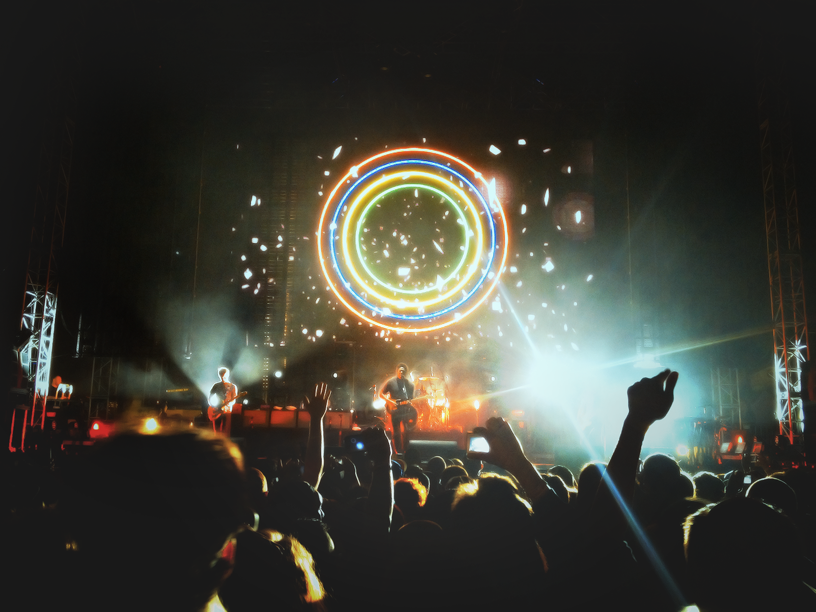
Bloc Party performing songs from Four at HARD Summer 2012.

Bloc Party started writing material for a fourth album in 2011, but decided not to play live. In the meantime Okereke finished an EP titled The Hunter. The group stated they intended to release a new album in 2012. In May 2012, Bloc Party announced Four, which was released on 20 August 2012, after being made available to stream in its entirety for over a week preceding release. The album was recorded with Alex Newport, who had previously worked with At the Drive-In and The Mars Volta, in New York City. Bloc Party released "Octopus" that July and later released another single entitled "Day Four". The band released "Kettling" on 12 November 2012, followed by "Truth" on 25 February 2013. Four peaked at number three on the UK Albums Chart and at number 36 on the Billboard 200.

The band debuted new material during their 2013 North American tour, including "Children of the Future" at Rams Head Live!, "Ratchet" at The Pageant, "Montreal" at the Ogden Theatre and "X-cutioner's Song" at Mr. Smalls Theater in Pittsburgh. Lissack later confirmed the band's plans to release a new EP in "northern hemisphere summer". He told Marc Zanotti of Australian website MusicFeeds that the new material was "not like a continuation of the record we've just made, it's a completely separate thing [...] the next step; the next progression". "French Exit" was given its debut live performance at Crystal Ballroom on 24 May. Some of the new material would feature on The Nextwave Sessions, an EP announced on 25 June and for release on 12 August via Frenchkiss Records.

=== Hiatus and line-up changes (2013–2015) ===
During the summer tour of 2013, drummer Matt Tong left the band, with Sarah Jones filling in on drums for the remaining dates. Lissack told a Canadian newspaper, the National Post that the band were planning to take an indefinite hiatus following their appearance at the Latitude Festival on 19 July. In October 2013, Kele assembled a DJ Mix for !K7's Tapes mix series, released under the Bloc Party name. In September 2014, Okereke stated that Bloc Party were working on a fifth album. In March 2015, bassist Gordon Moakes tweeted he had parted ways with Bloc Party. Following the departure of their former members, Okereke and Lissack started to work on new songs on their own in late 2014.

At the time, the departures of Moakes and Tong were shrouded in rumour and innuendo. Okereke alluded to drugs being an issue on multiple occasions, after he had to intervene during a Bloc Party performance. He told The Guardian: "There's a song where somebody makes a mistake and … well, I guess Gordon makes a mistake. And I say something to him, and he kind of responds, and I realised at that point that this was as far as our relationship was gonna go. I've never interfered with anyone's performance before, and I thought that if that was the state of our relationship, it felt fitting that this should be our last show together." Before the article was published Okereke told NME that "I can tell you it was about someone doing cocaine and someone not being into it. That's all I'm gonna say." Before publication Okereke contacted The Guardian to address his comments to NME saying the 'someone' he referenced was a person around the band, not actually in the band: "This then led to a big argument and that's the situation," he says. "I don't want people to think Matt and Gordon were cokeheads, and that's why we had to lose them. And I don't want their families thinking that." In a 2024 interview, Tong elaborated that his departure was due to feeling unable to continue working with Okereke, with the breaking point being Okereke's attempted removal of someone in the band's touring party whose birthday celebration on their bus involved the aforementioned drugs. Tong claimed he wasn't present during the incident, took exception when he heard about what had happened, and quit via email with the band still in the middle of a summer festival tour. In a 2025 interview, Moakes said Tong's departure prompted his own decision to also quit after finishing that tour, since he felt that Tong "was the heartbeat of the band" and that he did not wish to continue in Bloc Party without Tong.

Bloc Party unveiled their new line-up at two intimate gigs in the Los Angeles area (19 August 2015 at The Glass House in Pomona and 20 August 2015 at The Roxy in Los Angeles). Following these performances, Bloc Party also subheadlined FYF Fest in Los Angeles on 22 August 2015. At these shows, the band confirmed that they've finished recording their next album. The shows marked the live debut for new bassist Justin Harris of the Portland, Oregon, indie rock outfit Menomena, who had previously opened several Bloc Party U.S. tour dates in April 2009; and Louise Bartle, who was accidentally announced a month earlier as Bloc Party's drummer by instrument manufacturer Natal Drums in a since-deleted tweet, leading to fan speculation regarding her membership that was ultimately proved correct. These shows also included the first performances of two new songs called "Eden" and "Exes" according to the setlist.

=== Hymns and Silent Alarm Live (2015–2019) ===
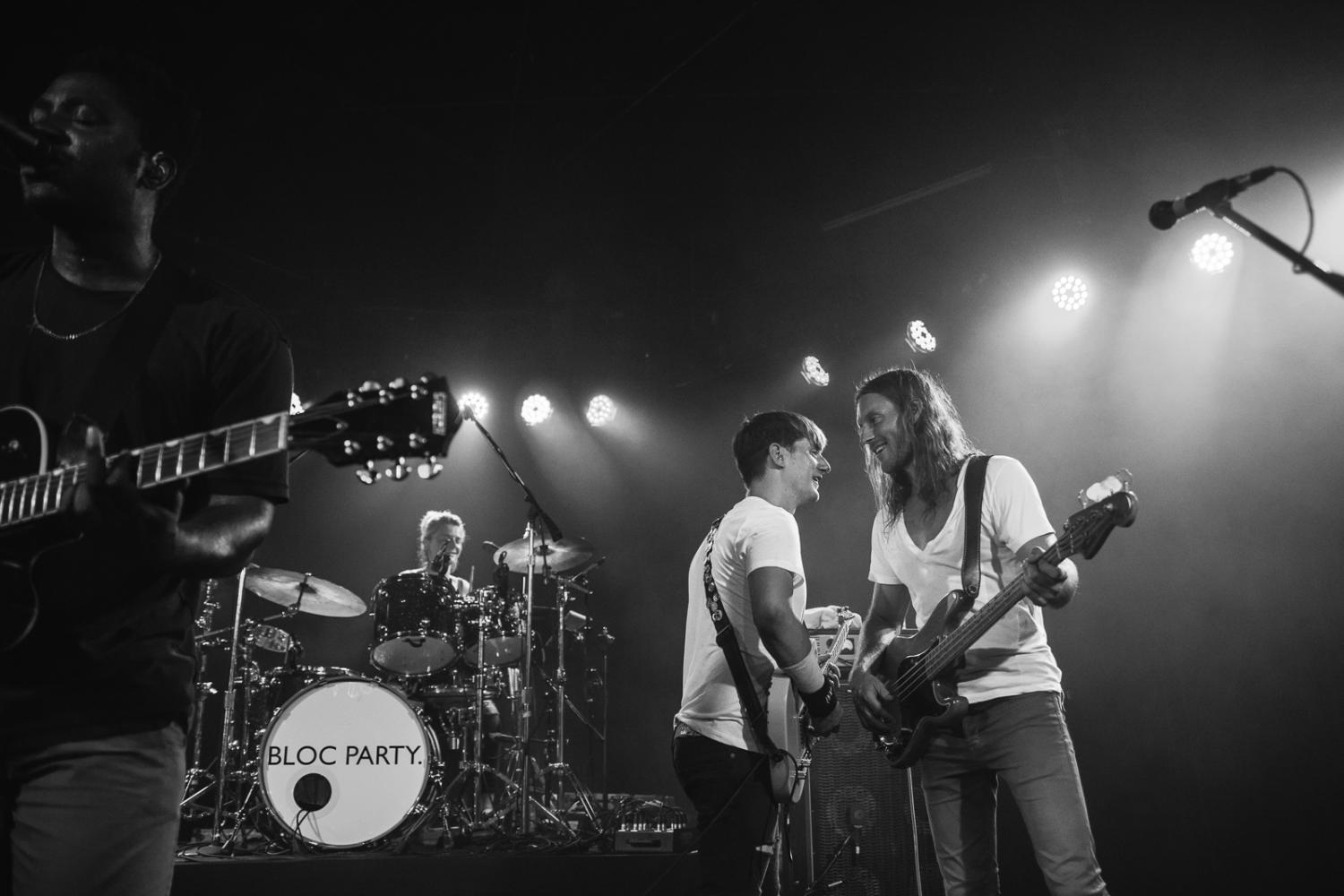
Bloc Party performing in 2015.

In a performance at Maida Vale, Bloc Party gave "The Good News" its live debut; hours later, "The Love Within" was featured as "Hottest Record in the World" by Annie Mac on BBC Radio 1. Okereke revealed the band's upcoming fifth album is set to be titled Hymns. The album's release was later confirmed on social media as 29 January 2016.

Later in 2016, the band released the standalone single 'Stunt Queen' to mark their performance at the Hollywood Bowl, which Okereke claimed was a "significant milestone" for the band. It marks some of the first new material that featured Harris and Bartle as co-writers.

March 2018 saw the band announce a series of shows touring their 'Silent Alarm' album which would be played in full. Due to the success of this short tour, Bloc Party announced further dates in 2019 again playing tracks from the whole of their debut.

=== Alpha Games and The High Life EP (2020–2023) ===
On 22 January 2020, Okereke announced on his personal social media accounts that Bloc Party had begun writing a new album. On 22 September 2021, Bloc Party posted to their official Twitter account a sneak peek of the tracklist/recording progress of their soon to be released sixth studio album. When interviewed by NME on what to expect of the new album, Okereke said that Bloc Party was "not the same band" and while aspects of the chemistry changed, they were excited about that.

On 23 November 2021, Bloc Party released the first single "Traps" off their sixth studio album Alpha Games. The album was released on 22 April 2022. A second single "The Girls Are Fighting" was released on 26 January 2022 and the responding music video was released on 28 January 2022. On 25 February 2022, the third single "Sex Magik" was released. A fourth single, "If We Get Caught", was released on 24 March 2022.

In October 2022, it was announced Bloc Party would be supporting Paramore during their 2023 UK and Ireland tour, as well as their North American tour as announced the following month. During the tour's London stop, Okereke duetted with Hayley Williams on a cover of the band's song "Blue Light".

On 21 June 2023, Bloc Party announced a new EP titled The High Life EP, which was released a month later on 21 July. It was preceded by the singles "High Life" and "Keep It Rolling", the latter of which featuring KennyHoopla, which were released on 21 April 2023 and 2 June 2023 respectively. Justin Harris did not participate in the EP's recording, with bass and keyboard parts instead handled by Skindred's Daniel Pugsley. Later in 2023, Harris was officially replaced by Palace bassist Harry Deacon.

=== Anatomy of a Brief Romance (2024–present) ===
In June 2024, the band released a stand-alone single entitled "Flirting Again", marking their first new music since The High Life. On 22 November 2024, Bloc Party officially released the compilation A Weekend in the City: B-Sides. The demos and B-sides from that era of the band had been available online for years previously as a bootleg compilation, sometimes referred to as Another Weekend in the City, but had never seen an official release. The same day, the band removed the album from streaming, stemming from audio quality concerns. The compilation was ultimately re-released on 20 December 2024.

Following a world tour in 2025, celebrating 20 years of Silent Alarm and 25 years as a band, Okereke confirmed the band were working on their seventh album with producer Trevor Horn. The album was officially announced in May 2026 with the title Anatomy of a Brief Romance, with Okereke describing it as a concept album covering both the end of his long-term relationship and the start of a new one. The album's lead single, "Coming On Strong", was shared the same day.

In May 2026, the band announced a North American tour.

== Musical style ==
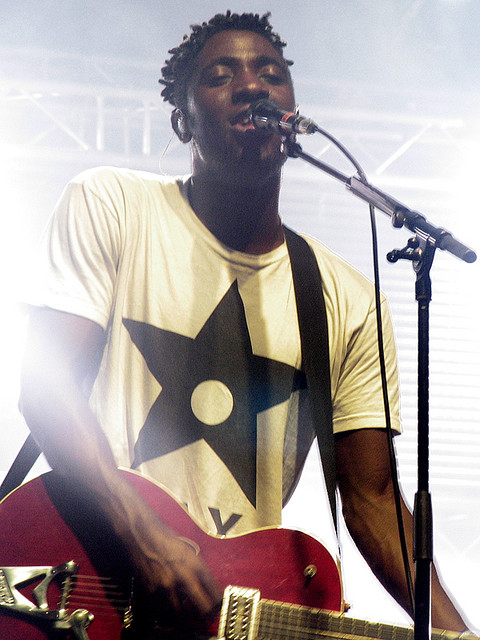
Kele Okereke

Bloc Party's musical style has been described as indie rock, post-punk revival, post-Britpop, alternative rock, art punk, art rock, dance-rock, and alternative dance. Early on, Bloc Party's sound was shaped primarily by American alternative rock bands Smashing Pumpkins and Weezer. Other influences included the Chemical Brothers, Pixies, Joy Division, Sonic Youth and the Smiths. Both Kele Okereke and Russell Lissack have been influenced by Britpop acts, particularly Blur, though Okereke also cites Suede and their album Dog Man Star as an inspiration. Okereke stated that Mogwai's album Mogwai Young Team changed his life by being his musical "year zero". Parallels have also been made between Bloc Party and bands such as OMD, The Cure, and Gang of Four. Regular comparisons to the last of these groups "mildly infuriated" Bloc Party, who claimed they had never "particularly liked" Gang of Four.

To achieve their unique style, numerous delay and other effects pedals are implemented. During the recording of second album A Weekend in the City, the band suggested it would contain "some truly R&B styled beats, a song where [Tong] and [Moakes] play drums simultaneously [with] both eggshell-thin fragility and trouser-flapping hugeness", as opposed to their typical sound. The style was inspired by Radiohead. Some of the most noticeable changes between debut Silent Alarm and A Weekend in the City are that the songs became more layered and less raw due to inclusion of string arrangements.

With the release of "Flux", Bloc Party's style became even more diverse with the inclusion of electronic music. "Mercury" saw Bloc Party distance themselves even further from the traditional guitar band set-up by experimenting with dark electronic sounds and a brass section inspired by Siouxsie and the Banshees. The band's third album Intimacy also features synths, processed drum beats and loops, vocal manipulation, and choral arrangements. Even though the album was influenced by electronic music, the band still had not lost their feel for guitar music. For example, in an interview, Okereke said that the band was starting to miss their more traditional sound, and confirmed that may have been the way fourth album was headed. However, Tong contradicted this, stating: "There's every chance we might go back to more orthodox arrangements or things that resemble a traditional band but I don't think we'll ever write songs like we did on Silent Alarm again."

== Band members ==
=== Current ===
| Image | Name | Years active | Instruments | Release contributions |
|---|---|---|---|---|
| | Kele Okereke | 1999–present | lead vocals; rhythm guitar; sampler; electric piano | all releases |
| | Russell Lissack | 1999–present | lead guitar; programming | all releases |
| | Louise Bartle | 2015–present | drums; percussion; backing vocals | all releases from Hymns (2016) (Note: Bartle provided only uncredited backing vocals to Hymns, with her first album with the band as a fully-fledged member being Alpha Games.) to present |
| | Harry Deacon | 2023–present | bass guitar; synthesiser; backing vocals | all releases from Anatomy of a Brief Romance (2026) to present |

=== Former ===
| Image | Name | Years active | Instruments | Release contributions |
|---|---|---|---|---|
| | Gordon Moakes | 2002–2015 | bass guitar; backing and occasional lead vocals; keyboards; synthesiser; electronic drums; glockenspiel | all releases until The Nextwave Sessions (2013) |
| | Matt Tong | 2002–2013 | drums; percussion; backing vocals | all releases until The Nextwave Sessions (2013) |
| | Sarah Jones | 2013 (touring only) | drums; percussion; backing vocals | none |
| | Justin Harris | 2015–2023 | bass guitar; synthesiser; backing vocals | The Love Within EP (2016); Hymns (2016); Silent Alarm Live (2019); Alpha Games (2022) |
| | Daniel Pugsley | 2023 | bass guitar; synthesiser; backing vocals | The High Life EP (2023) |

== Discography ==
Studio albums

- Silent Alarm (2005)
- A Weekend in the City (2007)
- Intimacy (2008)
- Four (2012)
- Hymns (2016)
- Alpha Games (2022)
- Anatomy of a Brief Romance (2026)

== Awards and nominations ==
Bloc Party awards and nominations
Awards and nominations
| Award | Wins | Nominations |
| Ivor Novello | 1 | 1 |
| MTV Europe | 0 | 1 |
| NME | 0 | 6 |
| PLUG | 1 | 6 |

Totals (Note: Certain award groups do not simply award one winner. They acknowledge several different recipients, have runners-up, and have third place. Since this is a specific recognition and is different from losing an award, runner-up mentions are considered wins in this award tally. For simplification and to avoid errors, each award in this list has been presumed to have had a prior nomination.)
- Wins: 2
- Nominations: 14

Bloc Party have had several nominations from a number of different awarding bodies during their recording career. The band themselves were nominated for 'Best New Artist' at the 2005 NME Awards, and were also up for the 'Best Alternative Act' category at the 2005 MTV Europe Music Awards. In 2006, Bloc Party were nominated for another NME Award, this time in the 'Best British Band' category. They were also shortlisted for three PLUG Awards: 'New Artist of the Year' in 2005, and 'Artist of the Year' and 'Live Act of the Year' in 2006. At the 19th GLAAD Media Awards in 2008, they were nominated in the 'Music Artist' category for their work on second album A Weekend in the City.

Their debut album Silent Alarm was nominated for the 2005 Mercury Music Prize and won the NME award for 'Best Album'. It was also nominated as 'Album of the Year' at three different ceremonies: the New Pantheon Music Award (Shortlist Music Prize), the 2006 NME Awards, and the 2006 PLUG Awards, where "Helicopter" was also up for 'Best Music Video'. The record won the award for 'Best Indie Rock Album' at the 2006 PLUG Awards. At the 2008 NME Awards, "Flux" was nominated in three different categories: 'Best Track', 'Best Video' and 'Best Dancefloor Filler'.

In May 2025, it was announced that Okereke, Lissack, Moakes, and Tong, as the original four members of Bloc Party, were set to receive an Ivor Novello Award in the Outstanding Song Collection category.
