= Nate Henricks =

American songwriter

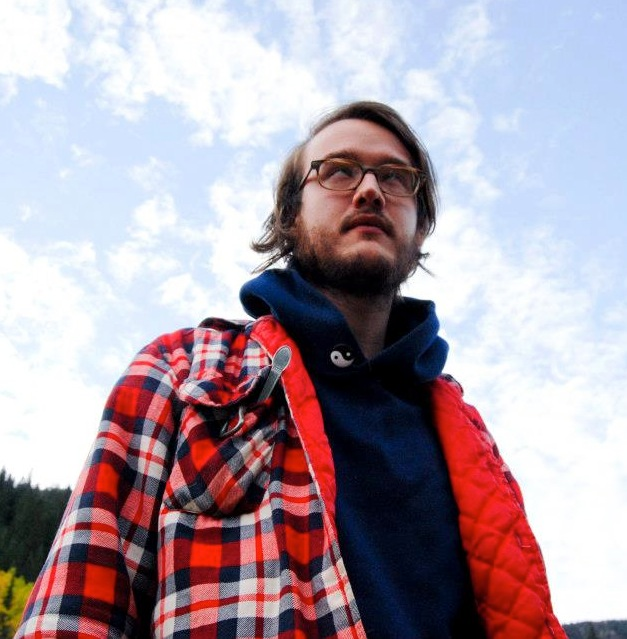
- Nate Henricks

Background information
- Born: March 4, 1987 (age 38)
- Genres: Lo-fi music

Nate Henricks (born March 4, 1987) is a songwriter, producer, and visual artist from Peoria, Illinois. Henricks's work has received critical attention for its 'internet generation collage style' and for his alignment with the underground lofi movement of the 2000s. A number of his albums have been released on various small-run tape labels across the United States. Henricks has also been recognized for his unconventional approach to website design, music video composition, digital art, and painting.

== Discography ==
- We Make Low Art (2007)
- Music Makes Me Crash My Car (2009)
- 24 Mins. (2011)
- Jackdaws Love My Big Sphinx of Quartz (2011)
- Horse Carrot/Lemonade Guarantee (2011)
- Hang Out/Lay Low Top Grossing Films of 1984 split (2012) Released on cassette by Eat Tapes
- Prehistoric Candybar (2012) Released on cassette by Sunup Recordings
- Nth Meridian (2012)
- Close Encounters with Green Magic (2012) Released on cassette by Patient Sounds Intl.
- Horseradish (2013) Released on cassette by Patient Sounds Intl.
- Warp Time the Zoom Goon's Kookamunga (2013)
- Sleetmute (2014)
- Neon For No One (2014) Released on cassette by Crash Symbols
- Apple Juice (2014)
- Quest for the Obsolete Egg (2014)
- How I Got Nanoscopic (2015) Released on cassette by Truly Bald
- Crown Leaf Chorus (2016) Released on cassette by Patient Sounds Intl.
- wildness, ed. wildness (2022)
