= Russell Lissack =

English musician (born 1981)

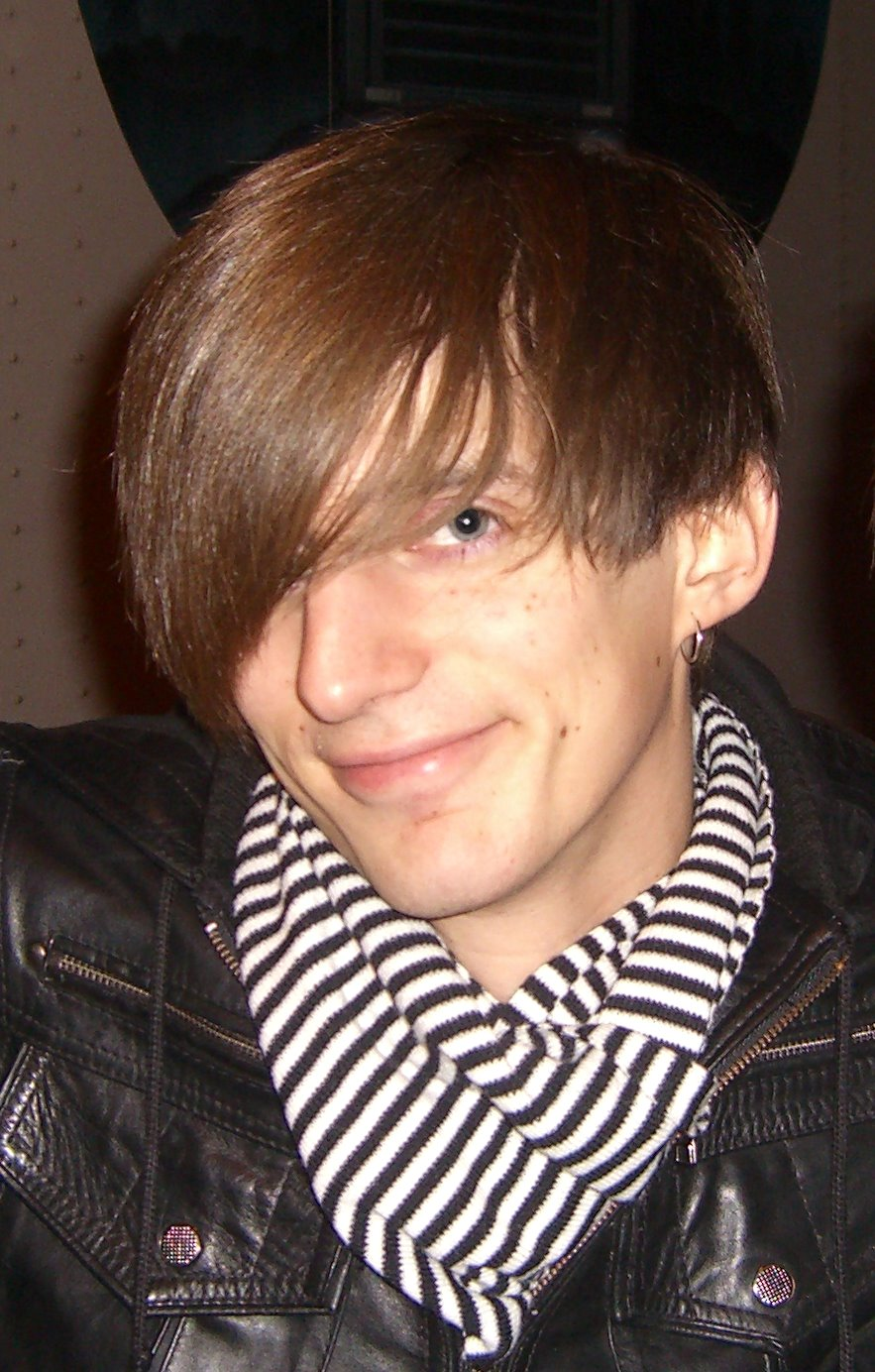
- Lissack in 2007

Background information
- Born: Russell Dean Lissack; 11 March 1981 (age 45); Chingford, London, England
- Origin: Chingford, London, England
- Genres: Indie rock; post-punk revival; alternative dance
- Occupation: Musician
- Instrument: Guitar
- Years active: 1999–present
- Member of: Bloc Party
- Formerly of: Pin Me Down; Ash (touring)
- Website: blocparty.com

Russell Dean Lissack (born 11 March 1981) is an English musician. He is the lead guitarist of London-based indie rock group Bloc Party, whom he founded with Kele Okereke in 1999. He released a self-titled album with side project Pin Me Down in 2010, and was a touring member of Ash from 2010 to 2011.

== Early life ==
Lissack grew up in Chingford in East London. He had some piano lessons as a child, but did not pursue music until he began guitar lessons at age 16, soon meeting other musicians including Bloc Party co-founder Kele Okereke. He studied at Bancroft's School and did A-levels at Epping Forest College before attending the London South Bank University.

Lissack said in 2010 that his interests would switch between dance music and rock music depending on the quality of each genre at any given time. He said that the late 1990s and late 2000s were periods that he found rock to be boring and followed dance music instead.

== Musical career ==
=== Bloc Party ===
Lissack and Okereke formed Bloc Party at the Reading Festival in 1999, with the aim of mixing rock and dance. He dropped out of his sociology course to commit to the band, and did not inform his parents of this until the band were successful. The band released three albums and achieved four entries in the top 10 of the UK Singles Chart before entering hiatus in late 2009, to spend more time with their families.

In April 2011, Lissack announced that Bloc Party were recording new material. Between the release of Four (2012) and Hymns (2016), bassist Gordon Moakes and drummer Matt Tong left; Lissack said in 2015 that he did not see the band as any different, as he and Okereke were still composing in the same manner.

Lissack told Guitar World in 2022 that the group's compositions began with Okereke introducing a chord sequence or other idea, and Lissack adding to or adapting it. He said that effects pedals were the key part of his sound, and that he had used around a hundred of them on most recent album Alpha Games. Lissack used four delay pedals for the introduction to "Like Eating Glass", the opening song on debut album Silent Alarm. As with Okereke, Lissack's primary instrument in a Fender Telecaster, that he bought from the United States in 2003 upon being signed by Wichita Recordings.

=== Pin Me Down ===
In 2010, during a hiatus in Bloc Party, Okereke began a solo career and Lissack released a self-titled album with his side project Pin Me Down, alongside American singer Milena Mepris. Lissack and Mepris met on Bloc Party's first U.S. tour and began jamming to Weezer songs. The pair shared their respective music and lyrics by email when separated. Robert Cooke of Drowned in Sound praised Lissack as having "the most imaginative guitar playing" of Bloc Party's generation but considered Pin Me Down to be too similar stylistically to the previous band's work, including Silent Alarm.

Lissack said in 2015 that Pin Me Down were unlikely to collaborate again, as Mepris was working in television.

=== Ash ===
In March 2010, Lissack was announced as a touring member of Northern Irish rock group Ash. He had been a fan of the band as a child and had been in a band covering their music. In September, he was hospitalised after being bitten by a lion cub at a nature reserve on tour in South Africa. He left Ash in March 2011. He then told the New Musical Express that he was writing and producing for Japanese duo Heavenstamp, who had sent him music on Myspace.

=== Other work ===
Lissack made a remix of Kate Nash's 2007 single "Pumpkin Soup". In 2018, Bloc Party drummer Louise Bartle established the group Novacub with her as singer and guitarist and Lissack also on guitar; he continued as a writer and musician after the group was reconstituted as her solo project.
