= Gordon Moakes =

English musician (born 1976)

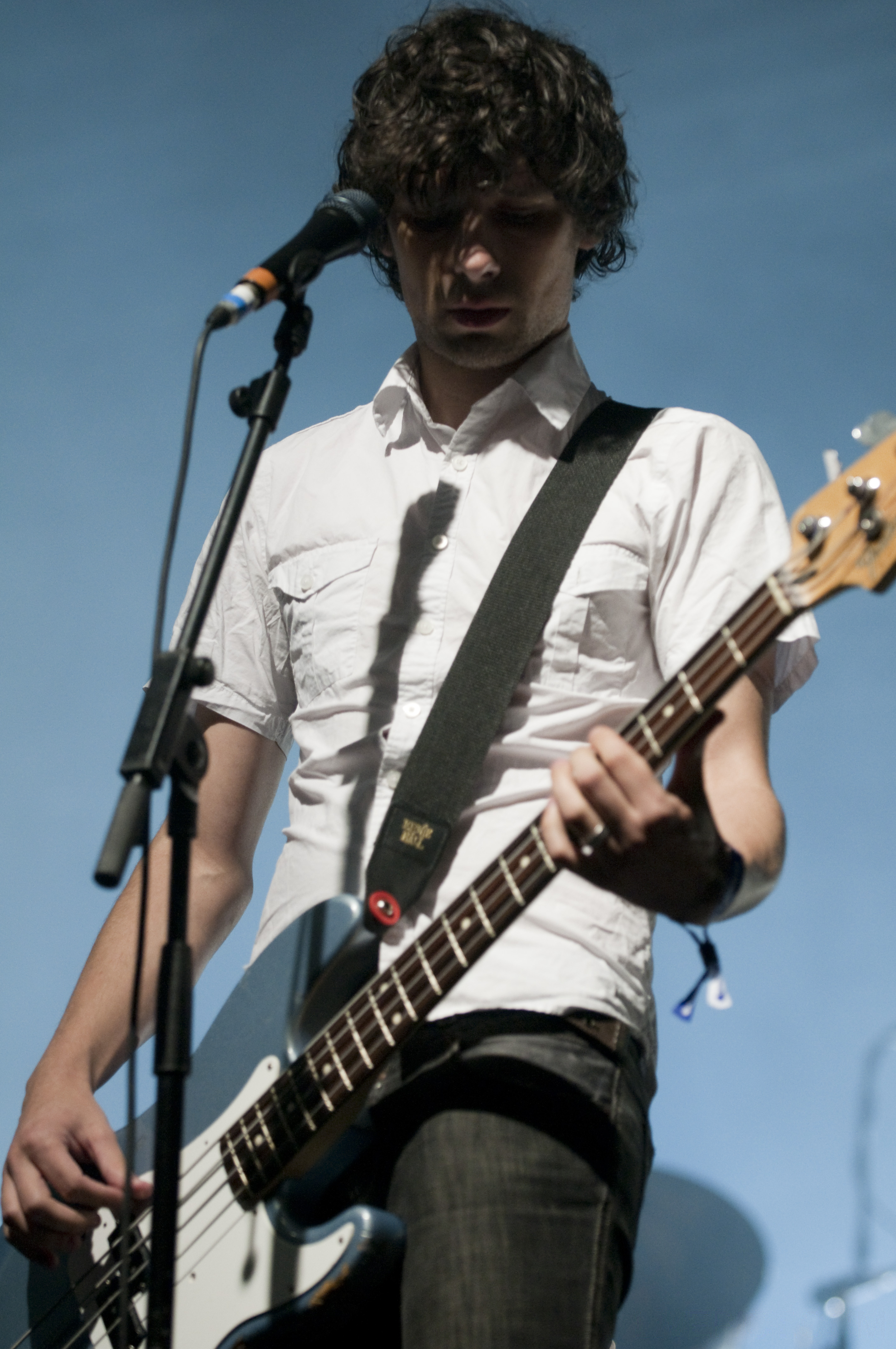
- Moakes performing with Bloc Party in 2007

Background information
- Born: Gordon Peter Moakes; 22 June 1976 (age 50); Newport Pagnell, Buckinghamshire, England
- Genres: Indie rock; post-punk revival; alternative dance; post-hardcore
- Occupations: Musician; songwriter; multi-instrumentalist
- Instruments: Bass guitar; vocals; keyboards; drums; glockenspiel
- Years active: 2002–present
- Member of: The None, Young Legionnaire
- Formerly of: Bloc Party

Gordon Peter Moakes (born 22 June 1976) is an English musician, best known as the bassist of rock band Young Legionnaire and former member of indie rock band Bloc Party.

== Bloc Party ==
Moakes became a member of Bloc Party after responding to an advertisement placed in the NME music magazine by Kele Okereke and Russell Lissack, who were seeking a bassist. Although not originally a bassist, Moakes was the only player the band auditioned who was able to play the bassline for a song that Okereke and Lissack had presented. In 2002, Moakes, Lissack, and Okereke formed the first incarnation of Bloc Party – then known as The Angel Range – and played shows across London. Moakes also ran and updated the band's website at the time.

Moakes shared co-writing credits with Okereke on some of the band's earlier lyrics. In the early days of the band, he contributed lyrics mostly to the band's more political songs, and he composed the song "Diet". Moakes added new instruments to his repertoire on Bloc Party's second and third albums, A Weekend in the City and Intimacy respectively. He played drums on "Sunday", electronic drums on "Ares", glockenspiel on "Waiting for the 7.18" and "SRXT" and a microKORG synthesizer on "Flux". His voice can be heard in many of the band's songs, often in contrast with Okereke's lead vocals.

Moakes remixed the band's song "Talons" from their album Intimacy. It was featured as a part of the single download as well as appearing as the B-side to its vinyl release.

In 2015, Moakes confirmed that he had left the band to focus on Young Legionnaire. He was replaced by Justin Harris later in the year. Moakes resided in Austin, Texas for several years but currently resides in London, England with his wife and children.

== Other works ==
Moakes worked with yourcodenameis:milo on the track "Wait a Minute" from the album Print Is Dead Vol 1. "Wait a Minute" was released on a limited edition 7" single on 4 October 2006. Moakes designed the cover art.

In December 2009, Moakes, Paul Mullen (vocalist and guitarist of The Automatic) and William Bowerman (drummer of La Roux) worked in the studio together on a new side project, with Bloc Party on hiatus and both The Automatic and La Roux inactive over the Christmas break. In January 2010, the group were revealed to be named Young Legionnaire and were set to play their first show at the end of January in London.
