= Bloc Party discography =

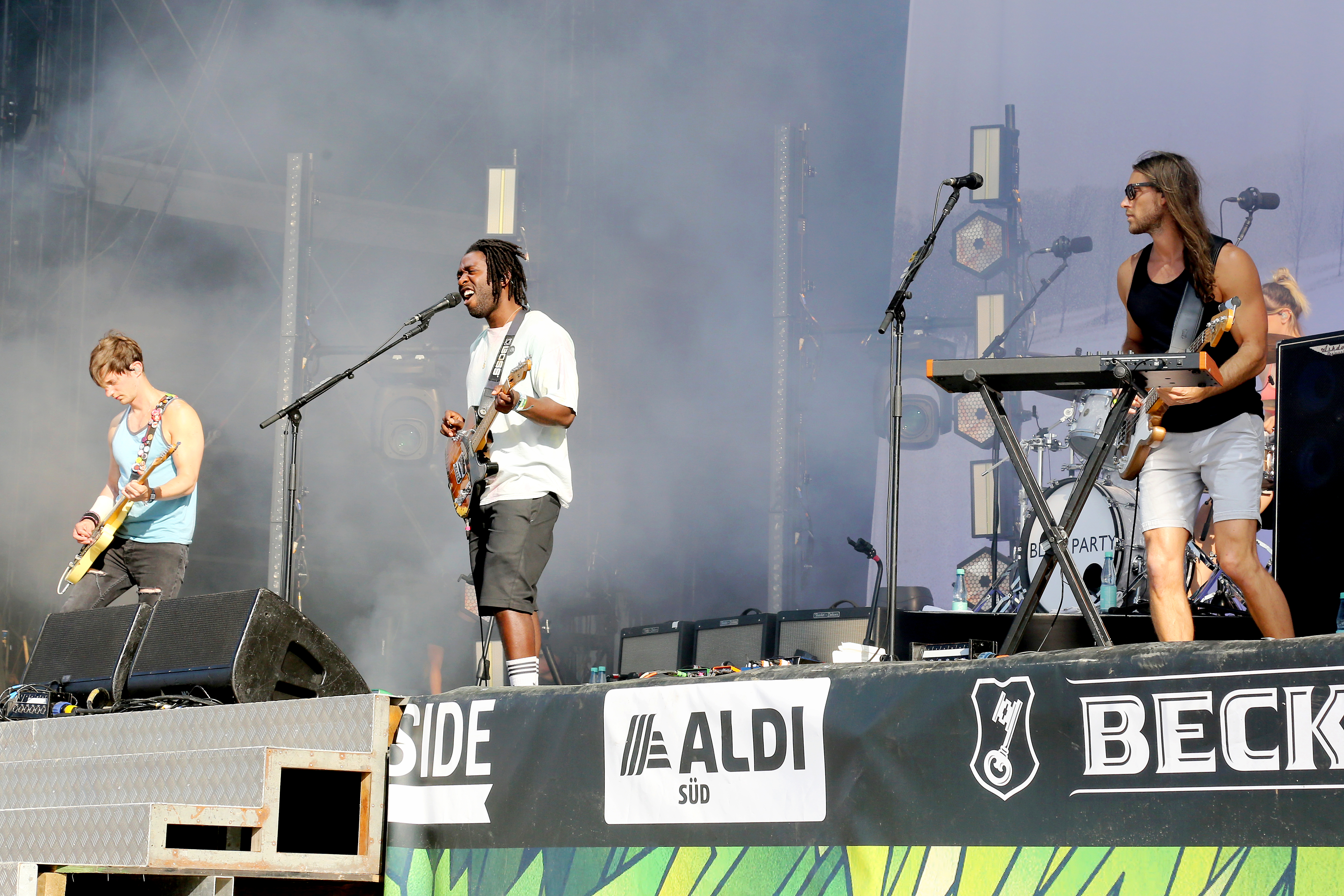
- Bloc Party performing live at Southside Festival in 2019
- Studio albums: 7
- Extended plays: 3
- Singles: 22
- Music videos: 19
- Remix albums: 2

The discography of Bloc Party, a British indie rock band, consists of seven studio albums, three extended plays (EPs), and two remix albums released on primary label Wichita Recordings. Bloc Party were formed in 1999 by chief songwriter and frontman Kele Okereke (vocals, rhythm guitar) and Russell Lissack (lead guitar). Bassist Gordon Moakes and drummer Matt Tong joined the band later. The first song by them that we know of is called "This Is Not A Competition" although it hasn't been officially released, it was the first song the band put on their official website. The quartet's first release was the Bloc Party EP in 2004; the first single, "She's Hearing Voices", was released and it failed to chart in the United Kingdom. The next EP, Little Thoughts was released the same year only in Japan; it included Bloc Party's first UK Top 40 entry, the double A-side "Little Thoughts/Tulips", which peaked at number 38.

Bloc Party's first studio album, Silent Alarm was released in 2005 and was the band's UK breakthrough by reaching number three on the UK Albums Chart. The album generated a hit single, "So Here We Are/Positive Tension", which peaked at number five on the UK Top 40. In late 2005, Silent Alarm was nominated for the Mercury Music Prize and was voted as the NME Album of the Year. After two years, during which their songs appeared on several compilations, the band members released A Weekend in the City in 2007. The record entered the UK Albums Chart at number two and debuted in the United States at number 12. The first single from the album, "The Prayer", peaked at number four on the UK Top 40 and is the quartet's highest charting UK song to date.

In 2008, Bloc Party released their third studio album, Intimacy, which reached a peak of number eight in the UK and entered the Billboard 200 in the US at number 18. The highest-charting single from the record was "Mercury", which peaked at number 16 on the UK Top 40. As of 2009, Bloc Party have sold more than three million album copies in their career. The band released Four, their fourth studio album, in 2012 through Frenchkiss Records. It was their first album following a prolonged hiatus for the band, during which several members of the band were involved in side projects. Four was produced by Alex Newport (The Mars Volta, At the Drive-In, and Polysics), and the album was recorded and mixed in New York City.

The band's fifth studio album, Hymns, was released in January 2016. It entered the UK Albums Chart at number 12. Though three singles were officially released from the album, none entered a singles chart.

Bloc Party's sixth studio album, Alpha Games was released on 22 April 2022. Their seventh, Anatomy of a Brief Romance, was released in September 2026.

== Albums ==
=== Studio albums ===
Title	Details	Peak chart positions										Certifications (sales thresholds)
Title	Details	UK	AUS	BEL (FL)	BEL (WA)	FRA	GER	IRL	SCO	SWI	US	Certifications (sales thresholds)
Silent Alarm	Released: 2 February 2005; Label: Wichita	3	30	14	39	14	93	3	3	80	114	BPI: 2× Platinum; ARIA: Gold; IRMA: Gold; SNEP: Silver
A Weekend in the City	Released: 24 January 2007; Label: Wichita	2	2	2	12	10	5	2	3	8	12	BPI: Platinum; ARIA: Gold; BEA: Gold; SNEP: Silver
Intimacy	Released: 21 August 2008 (digital); Released: 24 October 2008 (physical); Label: Wichita	8	5	2	16	22	18	12	13	37	18	BPI: Gold; ARIA: Gold; SNEP: Gold
Four	Released: 20 August 2012; Label: Frenchkiss	3	3	2	7	21	6	10	5	16	36	
Hymns	Released: 29 January 2016; Label: BMG	12	15	25	39	84	30	61	22	38	198	
Alpha Games	Released: 29 April 2022; Label: Infectious Music	7	—	91	39	125	17	—	5	41	— (Note: Alpha Games did not enter the Billboard 200, but peaked at number 57 on the Billboard Top Album Sales Chart.)	
Anatomy of a Brief Romance	Released: 11 September 2026; Label: Contagious Music	6	—	—	—	—	—	—	7	89	—	

=== Live albums ===
Title	Details
Silent Alarm Live	Released: 22 February 2019; Label: self-released; Formats: Download, streaming, CD, LP

=== Compilation albums ===
Title	Details
A Weekend in the City: B-Sides	Released: 22 November 2024; Label: PIAS; Format: Streaming

=== Remix albums ===
Title	Details	Peak positions						
Title	Details	UK	UK Dance	BEL (FL)	BEL (WA)	FRA	SCO	US Dance
Silent Alarm Remixed (Two More Years EP + Silent Alarm Remixed in Japan)	Released: 29 August 2005; Supplement to Silent Alarm featuring remixes of tracks.	54	20	91	99	171	70	4
Intimacy Remixed	Released: 11 May 2009; Supplement to Intimacy featuring remixes of tracks.	79	6	71	—	—	—	15

== Extended plays ==
Title	Details
Bloc Party	Released: 24 May 2004; Distributor: V2
Little Thoughts EP	Released: 15 December 2004; Distributor: V2 (Japan only)
Hearing Voices Live EP	Released: 20 December 2005; Distributor: Vice
Four More EP	Released: 9 August 2012; Distributor: Frenchkiss
The Nextwave Sessions	Released: 12 August 2013; Distributor: Frenchkiss
The Love Within EP	Released: 14 January 2016; Distributor: Frenchkiss
The High Life EP	Released: 21 July 2023; Distributor: Infectious/BMG

== Singles ==
Title	Year	Peak chart positions										Certifications	Release
Title	Year	UK	AUS	BEL (FL)	EU	GER	IRL	JPN	SCO	SWE	US Bub.	Certifications	Release
"She's Hearing Voices"	2004	—	—	—	—	—	—	—	—	—	—		Non-album singles
"Banquet/Staying Fat"	2004	51	—	—	—	—	—	—	63	42	—		Non-album singles
"Little Thoughts/Tulips"	2004	38	—	—	—	—	—	—	46	53	—		Non-album singles
"Helicopter" (Note: "Helicopter" was re-released as a single in the US in 2006)	2004	26	—	—	—	—	—	—	27	51	— (Note: "Helicopter" did not enter the Billboard Hot 100, but peaked at number 34 on the US Hot Singles Sales chart.)	BPI: Gold	Non-album singles
"Tulips" (Note: "Tulips" was released as a single in the US only)	2005	117	—	—	—	—	—	—	—	—	—		Non-album singles
"So Here We Are/Positive Tension"	2005	5	—	—	20	—	31	—	5	—	—		Silent Alarm
"Banquet"	2005	13	—	—	25	—	37	—	15	—	—	BPI: Platinum	Silent Alarm
"Pioneers"	2005	18	—	—	18	—	—	—	21	—	—		Silent Alarm
"Two More Years"	2005	7	—	—	17	94	49	—	7	—	—		Non-album single
"The Prayer"	2007	4	20	— (Note: "The Prayer" did not enter the Flanders Ultratop 50, but peaked at number 4 on the Ultratip chart.)	7	81	18	—	3	—	—		A Weekend in the City
"I Still Remember"	2007	20	—	— (Note: "I Still Remember" did not enter the Flanders Ultratop 50, but peaked at number 18 on the Ultratip chart.)	—	—	—	—	11	—	19		A Weekend in the City
"Hunting for Witches"	2007	22	—	— (Note: "Hunting for Witches" did not enter the Flanders Ultratop 50, but peaked at number 13 on the Ultratip chart.)	32	—	—	—	10	—	—		A Weekend in the City
"Flux"	2007	8	—	27	13	84	41	—	9	—	—	BPI: Gold	Non-album single
"Mercury"	2008	16	— (Note: "Mercury" did not enter the ARIA Singles Chart, but peaked at number 39 on the ARIA Physical Singles chart.)	— (Note: "Mercury" did not enter the Flanders Ultratop 50, but peaked at number 15 on the Ultratip chart.)	33	77	—	85	3	—	—		Intimacy
"Talons"	2008	39	—	— (Note: "Talons" did not enter the Flanders Ultratop 50, but peaked at number 5 on the Ultratip chart.)	—	—	—	—	15	—	—		Intimacy
"One Month Off"	2009	170	—	—	—	—	—	—	25	—	—		Intimacy
"Signs (Armand Van Helden Remix)"	2009	115	—	—	—	—	—	—	—	—	—		Intimacy Remixed
"One More Chance"	2009	15	61	13	18	—	—	—	17	—	—		Non-album single
"Octopus"	2012	121	—	— (Note: "Octopus" did not enter the Flanders Ultratop 50, but peaked at number 9 on the Ultratip chart.)	—	—	—	99	—	—	— (Note: "Octopus" did not enter the Billboard Hot 100, but peaked at number 9 on the US Hot Singles Sales chart.)		Four
"Kettling"	2012	—	—	—	—	—	—	—	—	—	—		Four
"Truth"	2013	—	—	— (Note: "Truth" did not enter the Flanders Ultratop 50, but peaked at number 35 on the Ultratip chart.)	—	—	—	—	—	—	—		Four
"Ratchet"	2013	— (Note: "Ratchet" did not enter the UK Singles Chart, but peaked at number 52 on the UK Physical Singles Chart.)	81	—	—	—	—	—	—	—	—		The Nextwave Sessions
"The Love Within"	2015	—	—	— (Note: "The Love Within" did not enter the Flanders Ultratop 50, but charted as an "extra tip" on the Ultratip chart.)	—	—	—	—	—	—	—		Hymns
"The Good News"	2015	—	—	—	—	—	—	—	—	—	—		Hymns
"Virtue"	2016	—	—	—	—	—	—	—	—	—	—		Hymns
"Stunt Queen"	2016	—	—	—	—	—	—	—	—	—	—		Non-album single
"Traps"	2021	—	—	—	—	—	—	—	—	—	—		Alpha Games
"The Girls Are Fighting"	2022	—	—	—	—	—	—	—	—	—	—		Alpha Games
"Sex Magik"	2022	—	—	—	—	—	—	—	—	—	—		Alpha Games
"If We Get Caught"	2022	—	—	—	—	—	—	—	—	—	—		Alpha Games
"High Life"	2023	— (Note: "High Life" did not enter the UK Singles Chart, but peaked at number 64 on the UK Singles Sales Chart.)	—	—	—	—	—	—	—	—	—		The High Life EP
"Keep It Rolling" (with KennyHoopla)	2023	—	—	—	—	—	—	—	—	—	—		The High Life EP
"Flirting Again"	2024	—	—	—	—	—	—	—	—	—	—		Non-album single
"Coming On Strong"	2026	—	—	—	—	—	—	—	—	—	—		Anatomy of a Brief Romance
"Love Bombs"	2026	—	—	—	—	—	—	—	—	—	—		Anatomy of a Brief Romance
"Now We Can't Be Friends"	2026	—	—	—	—	—	—	—	—	—	—		Anatomy of a Brief Romance
"Pigwig"	2026	—	—	—	—	—	—	—	—	—	—		Anatomy of a Brief Romance
"Lagoon Blue"	2026	—	—	—	—	—	—	—	—	—	—		Anatomy of a Brief Romance
"—" denotes singles that did not chart, have not charted yet, or were not released. "×" denotes periods where charts did not exist or were not archived

== Other charted songs ==
Title	Year	Peak chart positions			Release
Title	Year	BEL (FL) Tip	BEL (WA) Tip	MEX Air.	Release
"Signs"	2009	—	—	25	Intimacy
"V.A.L.I.S."	2013	68	46	—	Four
"Paraíso"	2016	—	—	41	Hymns
"—" denotes singles that did not chart, have not charted yet, or were not released.

== Other appearances ==
Listed are songs that were not released by Bloc Party as stand-alone singles, but which were included in third-party formats.

Year	Song	Album	Details
2003	"The Marshals Are Dead"	The New Cross: An Angular Sampler	Previously released on the Bloc Party EP.
2005
2005	"This Modern Love"	The Wedding Crashers soundtrack	Previously released on Silent Alarm.
2005	"Like Eating Glass"	Cry Wolf soundtrack	Previously released on Silent Alarm.
2005	"The Present"	Help!: A Day in the Life	Specially recorded song.
2005	"Like Eating Glass (Tony Hawk Mix)"	Tony Hawk's American Wasteland	Reworked by Tony Hawk for his video game.
2006	"The Answer"	Transgressive Records Singles	Previously released on the Bloc Party EP.
2006	"Like Eating Glass (Black Strobe Remix)"	Black Strobe: A Remix Collection	Remixed by Black Strobe for his compilation.
2007	"Say It Right"	Radio 1's Live Lounge: Volume 2	Cover of a 2006 Nelly Furtado song.
2007	"Rhododendrons"	Causes 1	Previously released as a B-side to the 7" edition of "Hunting for Witches".
2009	"Where Is Home?" (Diplo Remix)	Decent Work for Decent Pay	Remixed by Diplo for his compilation.
2012	"We Are Not Good People"	FIFA 13 Soundtrack	Previously released on Four.
2013	"Ratchet"	FIFA 14 Soundtrack	Previously released on The Nextwave Sessions.

== Music videos ==
Year	Title	Director(s)
2004	"Banquet" (version 1)	Nautilus
2004	"Little Thoughts"	Ben Dawkins
2004	"Helicopter" (UK version)	Type2error
2004	"So Here We Are"	AlexandLiane
2005	"Tulips"	Charles Spano and Tim Sutton
2005	"Banquet" (version 2)	AlexandLiane
2005	"Banquet" (version 3)	Scott Lyon
2005	"Pioneers"	Minivegas
2005	"Banquet" (The Streets Mix)	Adam Smith
2005	"Helicopter" (US version)	Minivegas
2005	"Two More Years"	Dominic Leung
2006	"The Prayer"	Walter Stern
2006	"I Still Remember"	Aggressive
2007	"Hunting for Witches"	OneInThree
2007	"Flux"	Ace Norton
2008	"Mercury"	Ace Norton
2008	"Talons"	Minivegas
2008	"One Month Off"	D.A.D.D.Y.
2009	"Signs" (Armand Van Helden Remix)	Hiro Murai
2009	"One More Chance"	Wendy Morgan
2009	"Ares" (Villains Remix)	Filmed live by fans on mobile phones
2012	"Octopus"	Nova Dando
2012	"Kettling"	James Lees
2013	"Truth"	Clemens Habicht
2013	"Ratchet"	Cyriak
2015	"The Love Within"	Ivana Bobic
2016	"Virtue"	James Copeman
2021	"Traps"	Alexander Brown
2022	"The Girls are Fighting"	
