= Silent Alarm Remixed =

Remix album by Bloc Party
- Released: 29 August 2005
- Recorded: 2004–2005
- Genres: Dance-punk, indie rock
- Length: 70:24
- Label: Wichita
- Producers: Paul Epworth, various artists

Bloc Party chronology
| Silent Alarm (2005) | Silent Alarm Remixed (2005) | A Weekend in the City (2007) |

Silent Alarm Remixed is the remix album to Silent Alarm, the debut album by British indie rock band Bloc Party. It was released on 29 August 2005 in the British Isles on Wichita Recordings, the band's primary label, and on 13 September 2005 in the United States through Vice Records to coincide with Bloc Party's worldwide touring schedule. The record peaked at number 54 on the UK Albums Chart. In the US, it achieved a peak of number four on the Billboard Top Electronic Albums.

Bloc Party commissioned Silent Alarm Remixed to show that remixes and dance music were relevant to the band and to the rock landscape at large. The band members gave each of the original tracks to a number of musicians from different genres; Ladytron, Four Tet, and Nick Zinner were amongst those who reworked the songs. Critics often considered the record as showcasing the potential high quality of remix albums, although some reviewers treated it as disjunct and a poor marketing decision.

== Origins and release ==
Bloc Party's critically acclaimed debut album Silent Alarm charted in 18 countries on four continents by the end of April 2005. The Japanese edition included three bonus songs which later appeared on Silent Alarm Remixed: "So Here We Are (Four Tet Remix)", "Plans (Mogwai Remix)", and "The Pioneers (M83 Remix)". The US double LP version contained another two tracks which later formed part of the track list: "Positive Tension (Jason Clark Remix)" and "Price of Gasoline (Automato Remix)". During the month of May, other musical acts were asked to remix the rest of the songs from the band's work. Frontman Kele Okereke has stated that the decision was taken because the band members wanted to show that dance music was significant to them as a rock quartet.

Fellow Vice Records band Death from Above 1979 were the first act to be asked and covered "Luno" as a B-side to their June 2005 single "Black History Month". Engineers reworked "Blue Light" after supporting Bloc Party at several concerts during the first half of 2005. Before their fame, Okereke and lead guitarist Russell Lissack were regular visitors to Erol Alkan's Trash club in London; the early contact with the band led Alkan to rework their first single "She's Hearing Voices". The band had also performed at Dave Pianka's Philadelphia club and the gig inspired the owner to remix "This Modern Love" with Adam Sparkle into something more suited to a disco. Ladytron were early fans of the band and invited the quartet for a performance at their Liverpool club before reworking "Like Eating Glass" for the release.

Whitey and Yeah Yeah Yeahs' Nick Zinner were the only acts to be hired based on their respective musical credentials. Bloc Party spent the whole of August 2005 promoting Silent Alarm Remixed at several European festivals. The record was released on 29 August following the band's headlining slots at the Reading and Leeds Festivals on 26–28 August. The final track list included the Bloc Party EP edit of "Banquet" by Silent Alarm producer Paul Epworth. The cover art is a negative of the bare winter landscape by freelance photographer Ness Sherry used on Silent Alarm.

== Critical reception ==
AllMusic's Heather Phares described the album as more consistent than most remix collections and noted that it functions well as a record in its own right. Priya Elan of NME explained that "the results are pretty much all quality" and that some of the tracks are better than the original songs on Silent Alarm. Rockfeedback's Thomas Hannan stated, "It's all very clever, but the most intelligent thing about it is that it makes you think about the original in a completely altered way." Pitchfork Media's Nitsuh Adebe was impressed with the album and indicated that it is "surprisingly good, and surprisingly often".

Christian Hoard of Rolling Stone was less receptive and commented that the tracks are flawed in conception, because Bloc Party is not a disco-oriented band despite its propulsive rhythm section. Nick Southall of Stylus suggested that the inherent problem with record is that the vocals have been removed from the "sympathetic stereo-treatment and layering" of Silent Alarm. Liam Colle of PopMatters was not impressed by Silent Alarm Remixed and commented that "the new tricks aren't quite charming, or very tricky for that matter", because the album "reeks of a marketing brainstorm". Drowned in Sound's Mike Diver concluded that the disparate nature of the record's contributors denies it the coherency of the original.

== Composition ==
Ladytron's mix of "Like Eating Glass" replaces the lead and rhythm guitars with looped synthesisers and adds a large amount of reverberation to the vocals; the resulting effect was described by Pitchfork Media's Nitsuh Adebe as "walking out of your apartment and thinking you can hear Bloc Party playing a festival six blocks over". Whitey reworked "Helicopter" in a minimalist fashion and introduced wolf howls and a xylophone staccato to the song. The musician's effects gave the track a rawer sound than the original version according to Heather Phares of Allmusic. "Positive Tension" was remixed by Jason Clark of art punk band Pretty Girls Make Graves under the pseudonym "Blackbox". The song includes elements of oldschool jungle. The Paul Epworth edit of single "Banquet", under his "Phones" moniker, is more sparse than the original and is closer to dance music than indie rock.

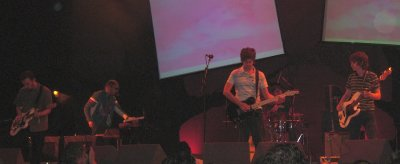
Bloc Party's former tour support act Engineers reworked "Blue Light" by reducing its tempo and by keeping its basic elemental structure intact.

Engineers' "Blue Light" was dubbed the 'Anti-Gravity' mix and resulted in an ambient track which Nick Southall of Stylus considered as good as Bloc Party's version. Erol Alkan's reworking of debut single "She's Hearing Voices" is a dub version over twice the length of the blueprint. The song accentuates the punk funk elements in Bloc Party's work. Alkan has noted that his priority was to get more out of the track's groove and melody since "the original is so fast it kind of flies by without you being able to recognise [its] beauty". Dave Pianka and Adam Sparkle's work on "This Modern Love" resulted in a musical construction akin to 1980s new wave bands Blondie and The Cure. M83 used several studio effects to create an ambient version of single "The Pioneers" by adding strings and synthesisers to the original composition. Automato's remix of "Price of Gasoline" infuses Bloc Party's blueprint with electronica elements.

Solo act Kieran Hebden, under his Four Tet alias, provided the remix for "So Here We Are" and created a folktronica version of the original, reminiscent of the music once produced by Windham Hill Records according to Christian Hoard of Rolling Stone. Death From Above 1979's version of "Luno" is the only re-recording on Silent Alarm Remixed and is wholly in the dance-punk genre. Bloc Party drummer Matt Tong has stated, "It's a really aggressive take on our music." Mogwai's mix of "Plans" adds an extensive use of echo to the original song, while Nick Zinner's remix of "Compliments" created in Shibuya, Tokyo accentuates Okereke's whispers to create vocal effects similar to those of The Cure's Robert Smith according to Adebe.

== Track listing ==
All songs originally written and composed by Bloc Party and remixed by each credited artist.

| No. | Title | Length |
|---|---|---|
| 1. | "Like Eating Glass" (Ladytron Zapatista Mix) | 4:16 |
| 2. | "Helicopter" (Sheriff Whitey Mix) | 4:32 |
| 3. | "Positive Tension" (Blackbox Remix) | 4:25 |
| 4. | "Banquet" (Phones Disco Edit) | 5:25 |
| 5. | "Blue Light" (Engineers 'Anti-Gravity' Mix) | 3:01 |
| 6. | "She's Hearing Voices" (Erol Alkan's Calling Your Dub) | 8:23 |
| 7. | "This Modern Love" (Dave P. and Adam Sparkle's Making Time Remix) | 5:01 |
| 8. | "The Pioneers" (M83 Remix) | 5:50 |
| 9. | "Price of Gasoline" (Automato Remix) | 4:47 |
| 10. | "So Here We Are" (Four Tet Remix) | 6:26 |
| 11. | "Luno" (Bloc Party vs. Death from Above 1979) | 3:56 |
| 12. | "Plans" (Replanned by Mogwai) | 3:42 |
| 13. | "Compliments" (Shibuyaka Remix by Nick Zinner) | 10:40 |

=== Bonus tracks ===
- "Banquet" (Cornelius Remix) – 10:47 (there is also a 4:37 version) – track 14 on the Japanese edition
- "Tulips" (Minotaur Shock Remix) – 5:19 – hidden track begins at 5:21 of the last song on the UK and US editions and at 5:28 of the last song on the Japanese edition.

U.S. Bonus Disc

1. "Storm and Stress" – 2:47
2. "Always New Depths" – 4:57
3. "Skeleton" – 3:16
4. "Plans" (Acoustic) – 3:22
5. "Storm and Stress" (Acoustic) – 3:13

Japanese Bonus Disc
Two More Years EP

1. "Two More Years" – 4:07
2. "Two More Years" (Edit) – 3:44
3. "Banquet" (The Streets Mix) – 3:49
4. "Hero" – 4:09

Music videos

1. "Two More Years"
2. "Banquet" (The Streets Mix)
3. "The Pioneers"

== Release history ==
| Region | Date | Label | Format(s) | Catalog |
|---|---|---|---|---|
| United Kingdom and Ireland | 29 August 2005 | Wichita Recordings | CD, digital download, LP | WEBB090 |
| Europe | 29 August 2005 | V2 Records | CD | VVR1034792 |
| United States | 13 September 2005 | Vice Records | CD, digital download | VICE 94116 |
| United States | 13 September 2005 | Dim Mak Records | LP | DM093 |
| Japan | 26 October 2005 | V2 Records | CD | V2CP-243/4 |

== Chart positions ==
| Chart (2005) | Peak |
|---|---|
| UK Albums Chart | 54 |
| Billboard Top Electronic Albums (US) | 4 |
| Billboard Top Independent Albums (US) | 37 |
| Billboard Top Heatseekers (US) | 28 |
| Belgian Albums Chart (Flanders) | 91 |
| Belgian Albums Chart (Wallonia) | 99 |
| French Albums Chart | 171 |
