= Little Thoughts =

Little Thoughts may refer to:

- Little Thoughts (EP), Bloc Party EP
- "Little Thoughts"/"Tulips", Bloc Party CD single
