= Silent Alarm =

Studio album by Bloc Party
- Released: 2 February 2005
- Recorded: June and July 2004
- Studio: Various: Deltalab Studios (Copenhagen, Denmark); Miloco Studios (London, England); The Exchange (London, England)
- Genres: Indie rock; post-punk revival; dance punk; art punk
- Length: 50:35
- Label: Wichita
- Producers: Paul Epworth, Bloc Party

Bloc Party chronology
Little Thoughts (2004)	Silent Alarm (2005)	Silent Alarm Remixed (2005)

Singles from Silent Alarm
- 1. "Helicopter" Released: 25 October 2004; 2. "So Here We Are" / "Positive Tension" Released: 31 January 2005; 3. "Banquet" Released: 25 April 2005; 4. "The Pioneers" Released: 18 July 2005

Silent Alarm is the debut studio album by English rock band Bloc Party. Recorded in Copenhagen and London in mid-2004 with Paul Epworth as producer, it was released on 2 February 2005, by Wichita Recordings. The album peaked at number three on the UK Albums Chart. In the United States, it entered the Billboard 200 at number 114 and the Billboard Independent Albums at number seven. "Helicopter", the double A-side "So Here We Are/Positive Tension", "Banquet" and "The Pioneers" were released as singles. Silent Alarm went on to achieve worldwide sales of over one million copies.

Bloc Party aimed to create an album that appealed to followers of different musical genres. Building on the arrangements in their demo songs recorded in 2004, the band members moulded tracks largely through live takes during the Silent Alarm studio sessions. The compositional focus was on rhythm procured by guitar riffs and the drum and bass parts, while lyricist Kele Okereke's writing examined the feelings and hopes of young adults, including views on global politics. Following the album's completion, Bloc Party embarked on promotional tours before its release.

Silent Alarm garnered widespread critical acclaim upon release, with praise often centered on its fast tempo and passionate delivery. Later in 2005, it was remixed as Silent Alarm Remixed and was re-released with bonus tracks to coincide with Bloc Party's worldwide touring schedule. The album has received accolades throughout the music industry since its release.

== Background ==
In 2003, Bloc Party consisted of guitarists Kele Okereke and Russell Lissack, and bassist Gordon Moakes. After drummer Matt Tong auditioned and joined the trio, the band members' songwriting evolved and they started crafting tracks for Silent Alarm. Discussing the first demo "She's Hearing Voices", Okereke has stated that it "was really just a drum beat, which was something we couldn't do before because we relied on writing songs only with guitars". Self-recorded in a small, hired space in Acton, London, the song was followed by the May 2004 double A-side single, "Banquet/Staying Fat", produced by Paul Epworth. Bloc Party EP was subsequently released by Moshi Moshi Records in the UK, containing all three previous songs and new material.

Following exposure with British magazines and newspapers and a successful performance on BBC Radio 1, Bloc Party received a contract offer from Parlophone. The band members declined the opportunity because they did not want to work for a major record label and instead signed a recording contract with East London indie label Wichita Recordings, chosen because it did not want to stamp its agenda on the conception of records. Frontman and chief writer Okereke wanted Silent Alarm to emphasise the importance of finding pleasure in small mundane things, because "those are the sort of things that can be incredibly touching". The album was born out of "a nagging youthful urgency" and the realisation that responsibility has to be taken for the first time as a young adult. Before recording started, Okereke attended singing lessons to open up his voice.

== Recording ==
In June 2004, Bloc Party convened at Deltalab Studios in Copenhagen to make Silent Alarm with Paul Epworth. The band had already written demo songs to record, but Okereke has noted that "it is a creative process and you have to let yourself be inspired while you're in the studio as well". The Deltalab set-up posed problems, because it included bare mains cables and dated, malfunctioning equipment from the 1960s and 1970s. Bloc Party took three sessions to get acquainted with Epworth's methodology. The producer has called the recording time a "growing process" because Okereke was not wholly comfortable singing in front of people, especially after tonsil problems. Although the band members had preliminary ideas about a track's rhythm, they did not know how songs were going to start or end. Okereke often asked Tong to play something on the drums, which inspired him to mould a track by adding guitar chords to the beat.

"There is a real sense of space and atmosphere that you will hear in a techno-house style [but] you will not hear in a three-minute guitar pop song. It is a very difficult thing to try to put the two together without sounding lame. We are excited by it. The two songs 'Positive Tension' and 'She's Hearing Voices' are examples..."

— Kele Okereke, on Bloc Party's goal when making Silent Alarm

Bloc Party's priority when recording Silent Alarm was "to give the music more depth, sonically speaking" rather than focus on making a punk funk record. The band believed that 21st-century rock music could only survive if people started "mixing styles that aren't supposed to be together". Okereke has suggested that forward-thinking bands reach a plateau and start to question the boundaries of their medium; this leads to experimentation with elements from other genres. Bloc Party set out to explore the idea of merging different styles in the debut album, rather than in later work. Silent Alarm was crafted to appeal to R&B, electro, and pop fans, on top of the band's core indie rock fanbase. Okereke wanted the album to sound "very rich and full".

Preferring live recording takes for better sound authenticity, Epworth's style separated the band's elements by accentuating the bass and by allowing the guitarists space to improvise. The producer meticulously tuned and retuned the components of the drum kit for a specific sound and used ribbon or condenser microphones lined up in an equidistant formation. According to Lissack, the basic idea was to emulate the "optimum audio representation" of songs heard in a club environment by adding guitar lines on top of boosted drum and bass tracks. Epworth advised Bloc Party to shape dynamics "a bit more subtly". As the sessions progressed, the band members started experimenting with distortion pedals to add to their "chiming, clean guitar sound", although they did not listen to the producer about song structure. In the end, 15 tracks were recorded in 22 days in Copenhagen, while the vocal overdubbing was subsequently done at London locations. Throughout the studio sessions, Okereke focused closely on the nuances of songs by often amending "microscopics".

Epworth's bass-oriented production was key to creating a universally appealing album and was also used as a musical background to the lyrics. Okereke has explained that the songs were crafted to balance dark lyrics with uplifting melodies. He called the final version of Silent Alarm "technicolour" due to its stylistic choices and indicated that Bloc Party achieved the aim of making the songs sound "better and bigger" when they were recorded in the studio. Moakes later pointed out that the band members were relative novices when they entered the recording sessions, and that for the most part they only did what they were advised; this is an additional reason why the album is disjunct and not focused on any particular musical style.

== Composition ==
=== Music ===
"Banquet"
The syncopated forward rhythm and staccato guitar style in "Banquet" are typical of the rest of Silent Alarm.

Many of the arrangements on Silent Alarm are strongly percussive. The leading song, "Like Eating Glass", was inspired by a remix of The Smiths' "There Is a Light That Never Goes Out" Okereke heard in 2002. Its drum track was deliberately mixed louder than usual to add emphasis to the album's opening. "Helicopter" has a quick tempo of 171 beats per minute, while "Positive Tension" begins with a solitary bassline and builds up pace, first with a rhythmic drumming pattern, and then with a guitar solo towards its conclusion. "Banquet" involves lead guitar and rhythm guitar playing in syncopation, while "Blue Light" has a slower tempo and a crescendo towards the end. During the studio sessions, the Bloc Party EP version of "She's Hearing Voices" was reworked to include reverberation and stereo separation of the instrumental parts. "This Modern Love" begins minimally with panned vocals before the rhythm section enters the mix and the song intensifies.

The second half of Silent Alarm includes more studio effects. "Pioneers" opens with a series of delayed guitar harmonics, while "Price of Gas" is driven by a marching-like sound created by Moakes walking in the studio with planks of wood strapped to his feet. "So Here We Are" is the only track on the album to not include vocal overdubbing. The song contains layered audio tracks of guitar and is followed by "Luno", which begins with 32 bars of bass guitar and drums. "Plans" has a slower tempo and uses a synthesiser and effects such as flanging during the chorus. The final track, "Compliments", incorporates an electronic drum kit and the use of reverberation.

=== Lyrics ===
Silent Alarm does not contain a solitary lyrical centre and simply observes people's lives. Okereke wanted to leave individual listeners space to make their own conclusions, but has admitted that the record "operates in the realm of cultural politics". Much of the songwriting is inspired by the style of confessional poetry authors like Anne Sexton and musicians Thom Yorke and Björk. In general, Silent Alarm tries to make clear an existential pointlessness in life. With hindsight, Okereke noted themes of "helplessness and weariness" because of the album's focus on how he was feeling between the ages of 18 and 20. Professor John Sutherland has pointed out literary elements, often similar to Sylvia Plath's work, in the lyricist's writing. Discussing the opening track "Like Eating Glass", he explained, "It strikes me that whoever did the lyrics must have read some of her work. It has the same rather jagged, surprising imagery. It could sit fairly comfortably in a poetry anthology." The recurring line "We've got crosses on our eyes" is inspired by cartoon characters who have crosses on their eyes when they die. Okereke tried to convey the feelings in a failing relationship, "of being completely disorientated", using childhood metaphors.

According to Heather Phares of AllMusic, "The Pioneers" and "Price of Gasoline" exemplify the political undercurrent on Silent Alarm, the latter including the explicit chant "War / War / War / War". "Helicopter" focuses in equal measure on America's "red states" and on UK apathy and "the people queueing for the McDonald's by [Okereke's] house". "Positive Tension" concerns boredom and its dangers, focusing on how it "can lead you into dark places", while "Banquet" details "how sex is about power, submission, domination and real rapacious desire". The lyrics in the chorus of "She's Hearing Voices", "Red pill / Blue pill / Milk of amnesia", are in reference to the medications a friend of Okereke's took to relieve the symptoms of schizophrenia. The lyricist has described the moment in "This Modern Love" when the backing vocals enter the mix before the second chorus as "perfect", because it evokes the idea of "two people on the telephone, who can't touch each other, and as the song and the conversation progress, everything amplifies".

== Promotion and release ==
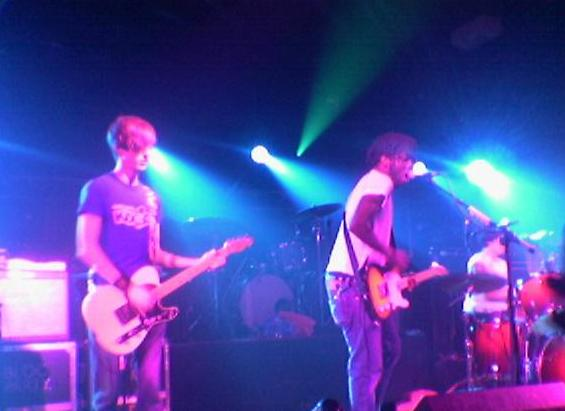
Bloc Party on stage at Manchester Academy 3 on 29 January 2005 during the NME Awards Tour

Bloc Party EP was distributed in America in September 2004 by Dim Mak Records, while the band performed several gigs at the end of the year in the US and Canada. The release of Silent Alarm was preceded by the marketing of Little Thoughts EP in Japan in December 2004, containing previous UK singles "Little Thoughts/Tulips" and "Helicopter" and new material. Bloc Party commenced UK promotional touring in January 2005 by performing during the NME Awards Tour. "Tulips" was released from Little Thoughts EP in the US on 25 January. The second single from Silent Alarm, "So Here We Are/Positive Tension", was released on 31 January and peaked at number five on the UK Singles Chart, the band's second highest peaking release on the chart (behind 2007's "The Prayer" which reached number 4). Between 31 January and 4 February, Bloc Party performed after autograph signing sessions in UK HMV stores. The band achieved exposure largely because of word-of-mouth and favourable press reviews.

Silent Alarm was released on 2 and 14 February 2005, in Japan and Europe respectively. Chosen because the album has a sense of disquiet, the name comes from an article in New Scientist about an early detection system for earthquakes in Japan, while the cover art is based on a bare winter landscape by freelance photographer Ness Sherry. Bloc Party followed the album's release with a short European promotional tour in early March 2005. Between 17 March and 9 April, the band undertook a first headlining US tour to coincide with the American release of Silent Alarm through Vice Records on 22 March. The US marketing was geared to establish a long-term fan base among "tastemakers and early-adopter rock enthusiasts", rather than a short-term emphasis on radio play. At the time, Okereke stated, "All I’m concerned about is playing live shows here to people who want to see us."

== Reception ==
=== Commercial ===
Silent Alarm entered the UK Albums Chart and the Irish Albums Chart at number three, selling 61,737 copies during the first week in the former country. The album achieved gold certification within 24 hours of its European release. 350,000 copies were shipped worldwide by the first week of March 2005; 20,000 were sent to America, double the record labels' January forecast. In the US, the record entered the Billboard 200 at number 114 and the Billboard Top Independent Albums at number seven. With little radio support, it became the best-selling release in Vice's history as a label. 123,000 copies of Silent Alarm were sold in the US by the end of July 2005. The record was listed at number 75 in the end-of-year UK Album Chart and was certified platinum by the British Phonographic Industry after more than 500,000 copies were sold in the UK during 2005. According to Nielsen SoundScan, 280,000 copies of the album were sold in the US by January 2007. By August 2012 it had sold 379,000 copies in the United States. At least 88,800 copies were sold in France. More than one million copies have been sold worldwide.

=== Critical ===
Professional ratings
Aggregate scores
Source	Rating
Metacritic	82/100
Review scores
Source	Rating
AllMusic	4.5/5 stars
Entertainment Weekly	A−
The Guardian	3/5 stars
The Independent	4/5 stars
Los Angeles Times	3/4 stars
NME	9/10
Pitchfork	8.9/10
Q	4/5 stars
Rolling Stone	4/5 stars
URB	5/5 stars

Silent Alarm received critical acclaim from critics; aggregating website Metacritic reports a normalised rating of 82 out of 100 based on 32 reviews which indicates "universal acclaim". Drowned in Sound's Gen Williams described the album as "mature and expansive" and wrote that "the autonomy, creativity and sheer, elastic beauty that spans this debut more than justifies the rapidly accelerating hype". Andrew Romano of Newsweek similarly noted that it "lives up to the hype". Summing the record up as "dance rock, but highly caffeinated", Barry Walters of Rolling Stone explained that the tracks are emotive and rhythmic in equal measure, while Nick Southall of Stylus Magazine thought that every song is "full of thrilling ideas and inspired moments". Johnny Davis of Q labelled Silent Alarm "an arty, confident and exhilarating debut", while Joshua Glazer of URB compared Bloc Party to "every legendary band ever who followed an EP with an even better album and on into greatness". The Guardian's Alexis Petridis was less receptive and commented that the "reedy vocals and lyrical evocations of suburban ennui ... induce a worrying ennui of their own". Heather Phares of AllMusic stated that the record is not perfect, but praised its "passion and polish".

Romano and Glazer compared Silent Alarm to U2's early work, while Walters claimed that it distills "twenty-five years of spiky British rock, from The Cure to Blur to hot Scots Franz Ferdinand". Pitchfork's Nitsuh Abebe noted particular similarities between "Banquet" and Franz Ferdinand's second single "Take Me Out", calling both songs "wonderfully tight and energetic—the same kind of spiffy half-dancing rock". Phares suggested that Bloc Party are more comfortable with lyrical proclamations than their contemporaries Franz Ferdinand or The Futureheads, while Imran Ahmed of NME concluded, "Silent Alarm is no Franz Ferdinand. In fact, listen to it with the words 'popular' and 'arty' in mind and its spirit is closer to the Manic Street Preachers' The Holy Bible."

== Tours and supporting releases ==
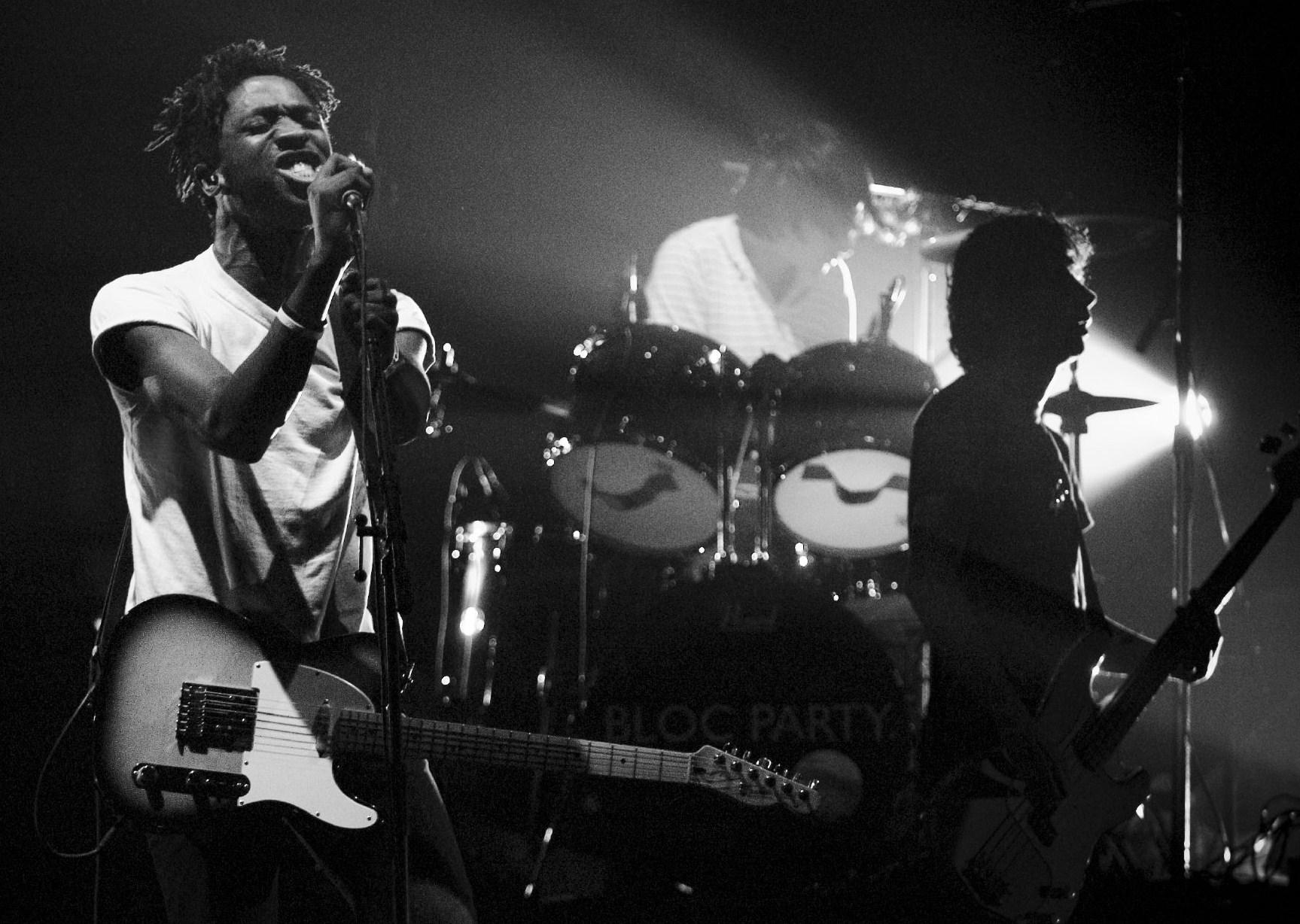
Bloc Party in concert at The Warfield, San Francisco, on 21 September 2005

By the end of April 2005, Silent Alarm had charted in eighteen countries on four continents. Bloc Party toured in Japan with The Rakes at the start of May and completed a headlining tour of the US in June. The band members played their first concerts in Australia in July and spent the whole of August on the European festivals circuit. The remix album Silent Alarm Remixed was released on 29 August 2005 following Bloc Party's headlining slots at the Reading and Leeds Festivals on 26–28 August. The record includes reworked versions of all original tracks by artists such as Ladytron, Death From Above 1979, and Nick Zinner from Yeah Yeah Yeahs.

In September 2005, the band members embarked on their second major worldwide tour of the year; they played several gigs in North America between 8 and 24 September. Another headlining UK tour during the whole of October coincided with the release of new single "Two More Years". Silent Alarm was re-released in the UK on 17 October 2005 with "Little Thoughts" and "Two More Years" as bonus tracks. It contained a bonus DVD, God Bless Bloc Party, which included Bloc Party's two June performances and backstage footage at El Rey Theatre, Los Angeles. Dan McIntosh of PopMatters stated that the concert documentary shows the band "can consistently pull off its material live", but concluded that it focuses on Bloc Party "much too intently, far too soon".

In March 2018, the band announced they would play the album in full for the first time. The tour would take place in October and November and would travel to Amsterdam, Paris, Berlin, Brussels, Dublin plus dates in the UK, Australia and New Zealand. A subsequent live recording would also be available.

== Accolades and legacy ==
"Silent Alarm didn't just make the band household names—it was a pivotal post-millennium release, effectively securing the reputation of its producer Paul Epworth and serving as a blueprint for domestic indie acts to follow: you can wear your heart on your sleeve while delivering punchy, pop-savvy rock music that appealed to radio heads and dancefloor doyens alike, and that bridged the commercial-critical divide brilliantly."

— Mike Diver of Clash in 2009, on the record's importance to UK independent music

Silent Alarm was shortlisted for the 2005 Mercury Music Prize, but was beaten by Antony and the Johnsons' second album I Am a Bird Now. It was also nominated for the 2005 Shortlist Music Prize, but lost to Sufjan Stevens' fifth album Illinois. The record was named Album of the Year for 2005 by NME ahead of Arcade Fire's debut album Funeral, by Intro in Germany, and by Rumore in Italy. URB included Silent Alarm in its unnumbered shortlist of the best records of 2005. It figured highly in other end-of-year best album lists: at number two by Hot Press and by Stylus Magazine, at number four by Drowned in Sound, at number six by Spin, at number seven by Metacritic's chief editor, and at number nine by The Denver Post. Silent Alarm earned Bloc Party several nominations, including Best Alternative Act at the 2005 MTV Europe Music Awards, Best British Band at the 2006 NME Awards, and Artist of the Year at the 2006 PLUG Awards. The record itself won Indie Rock Album of the Year at the 2006 PLUG Awards. It was also nominated as Best Album at the 2006 NME Awards, and as Album of the Year at the 2006 PLUG Awards.

In 2006, NME placed Silent Alarm at number 55 in its list of the 100 Greatest British Albums Ever!, while Drowned in Sound ranked it at number three in its list of the editorial staff's 66 favourite albums of 2000–2006. In 2009, Clash placed the record at number 11 in its list of the 50 Greatest Albums, 2004–2009. The same year, Pitchfork ranked it at number 156 in its list of The Top 200 Albums of the 2000s, while NME included it at number 38 in the list of The Top 100 Greatest Albums of the Decade decided by the publication's staff and music industry members. In 2010, Stylus Magazine placed Silent Alarm at number 31 in its list of the Top Albums of the previous decade.

== Track listing ==
All tracks are written by Bloc Party.

No.	Title	Length
1.	"Like Eating Glass"	4:22
2.	"Helicopter"	3:40
3.	"Positive Tension"	3:55
4.	"Banquet"	3:21
5.	"Blue Light"	2:47
6.	"She's Hearing Voices"	3:29
7.	"This Modern Love"	4:25
8.	"The Pioneers"	3:35
9.	"Price of Gasoline"	4:19
10.	"So Here We Are"	3:52
11.	"Luno"	3:57
12.	"Plans"	4:10
13.	"Compliments"	4:43

UK re-release bonus tracks
No.	Title	Length
14.	"Little Thoughts"	3:30
15.	"Two More Years"	4:28

Japanese bonus tracks
No.	Title	Length
14.	"So Here We Are" (Four Tet remix)	6:28
15.	"Plans" (Mogwai remix)	3:43
16.	"The Pioneers (M83 remix)" / "Every Time Is the Last Time"	14:09

- Tracks 8 and 9 are labeled on some album pressings as "Pioneers" and "Price of Gas" respectively.

CD hidden track

- "Every Time Is the Last Time" – 3:10 – track 0 (pregap) on the UK and US editions and after track 13 on the European edition

Vinyl

- There were two UK LP copies of Silent Alarm distributed by V2 Records: a standard black vinyl copy, and a limited edition picture disc version which has the album cover printed on Side A and the track listing printed on Side B.
- The US LP issue was distributed by Dim Mak Records. It comprises two limited edition 12" records which additionally contain a track listing for "Every Time Is the Last Time" on Side A, the appearance of "Little Thoughts" on Side C, and four bonus remix tracks—two of "Positive Tension" (Jason Clark and Johnny Whitney) and two of "Price of Gas" (Automato and Jus Ske)—on Sides E and F.

DVD

- A CD with an extra DVD was released in the UK and Europe in February 2005 at the same time as the normal CD version. The DVD portion contains live footage of Bloc Party at Heaven in London.
- A new version of the CD with an extra DVD was released in the UK in October 2005. The DVD, titled God Bless Bloc Party, contains a US tour documentary at El Rey Theatre, Los Angeles, live footage of Bloc Party at the 2005 Eurockéennes Festival in Belfort, France, and nine music videos from the band's career.
- God Bless Bloc Party was released as a stand-alone DVD in the US by Vice in January 2006, but did not include the music videos.

== Personnel ==
Those involved in the making of Silent Alarm are:

Bloc Party

- Kele Okereke – lead vocals, rhythm guitar
- Russell Lissack – lead guitar
- Gordon Moakes – bass, backing vocals, synthesiser
- Matt Tong – drums, backing vocals

Production

- Paul Epworth – production; programming on "Banquet"
- Bloc Party – production
- Eliot James – recording (except "Banquet" and "Compliments"), additional production and programming (except "Banquet")
- Mark "Top" Rankin – recording on "Banquet" and "Compliments"
- Joe Hirst – recording assistant
- "Fashion Show" – recording assistant
- Rich Costey – mixing

Artwork

- Ness Sherry – Album cover photograph
- Paul Epworth – photography (except Russell, Copenhagen)
- Matt Tong – photography (Russell, Copenhagen)

== Charts ==
Chart performance for Silent Alarm
Chart (2005)	Peak position
Australian Albums (ARIA)	30
Austrian Albums (Ö3 Austria)	52
Belgian Albums (Ultratop Flanders)	14
Belgian Albums (Ultratop Wallonia)	39
Canadian Albums (Nielsen SoundScan)	63
Dutch Albums (Album Top 100)	51
European Albums (Billboard)	6
Finnish Albums (Suomen virallinen lista)	18
French Albums (SNEP)	14
German Albums (Offizielle Top 100)	22
Irish Albums (IRMA)	3
Japanese Albums (Oricon)	23
New Zealand Albums (RMNZ)	36
Norwegian Albums (VG-lista)	20
Scottish Albums (OCC)	3
Swedish Albums (Sverigetopplistan)	11
Swiss Albums (Schweizer Hitparade)	80
UK Albums (OCC)	3
UK Independent Albums (OCC)	1
UK R&B Albums (OCC)	17
US Billboard 200	114
US Heatseekers Albums (Billboard)	3
US Independent Albums (Billboard)	7

== Certifications ==
Certifications for Silent Alarm
Region	Certification	Certified units/sales
Australia (ARIA)	Gold	35,000^{^}
Belgium (BRMA)	Gold	25,000^{*}
France (SNEP)	Silver	50,000^{*}
Ireland (IRMA)	Gold	7,500^{^}
New Zealand (RMNZ)	Gold	7,500^{‡}
United Kingdom (BPI)	2× Platinum	600,000^{‡}
^{*} Sales figures based on certification alone.^{^} Shipments figures based on certification alone.^{‡} Sales+streaming figures based on certification alone.
