= Like Eating Glass =

Song by Bloc Party

from the album Silent Alarm
- Recorded: 2004
- Genre: Dance-rock
- Length: 4:22
- Label: Wichita; Oxfam
- Songwriters: Kele Okereke; Russell Lissack; Gordon Moakes; Matt Tong
- Producers: Paul Epworth; Bloc Party

"Like Eating Glass" is a song by Bloc Party from their debut album Silent Alarm. It is the first track on the album. The song is one of their most popular amongst fans. The lyrics, as is typical of the band's early work, are poetic and ambiguous, and deal with feelings of being "completely disoriented" in failing relationships. A fan-made music video for the song was uploaded to YouTube and has received over 1.1 million views. The Black Strobe remix was released as a split single with The Futureheads by Oxfam. The song was also featured on the playlist of Tony Hawk's American Wasteland.

== Remixes ==
There are two remixes of the song. A remix by Ladytron was commissioned for Bloc Party's remix album "Silent Alarm Remixed".

The Black Strobe Remix was released on a 10" picture disc split single (by Bloc Party and The Futureheads) given away free by T-Mag. It came included with the book The Beat about "the art of rhythm", which included contributions from Dave Grohl of Foo Fighters, Paul Thomson of Franz Ferdinand, Charlie Watts of The Rolling Stones, as well as Matt Tong of Bloc Party and Dave Hyde of The Futureheads. It has Shy Child's remix of the song "Decent Days And Nights" by The Futureheads on side A, with Black Strobe's remix of "Like Eating Glass" on side B.

== Track listing ==
Oxfam Split Single with The Futureheads
No.	Title	Artist	Length
1.	"Decent Days And Nights" (Shy Child Remix)	The Futureheads	4:38
2.	"Like Eating Glass" (Black Strobe Remix)	Bloc Party	10:28
Total length:			15:05
