= She's Hearing Voices =

Single by Bloc Party

from the album Bloc Party & Silent Alarm
- Released: 16 February 2004
- Genre: Dance-punk
- Length: 3:29
- Label: Trash Aesthetics
- Songwriters: Russell Lissack, Gordon Moakes, Kele Okereke, Matt Tong

Bloc Party singles chronology
| "She's Hearing Voices" (2004) | "Banquet/Staying Fat" (2004) |

"She's Hearing Voices" is a song by Bloc Party that was first released on 7" vinyl by London-based independent label Trash Aesthetics in February 2004. It also appeared on their 2004 Bloc Party (EP). The song was later re-recorded for the band's 2005 debut album Silent Alarm, while "The Marshals Are Dead" was re-recorded and released on the 7" and DVD single versions of the "So Here We Are" single.

The song is reportedly about "a paranoid schizophrenic", a friend of frontman Kele Okereke.

== Track listing ==
=== 7" single ===
1. "She's Hearing Voices"
2. "The Marshals Are Dead"
3. "The Answer"
