= Helicopter (Bloc Party song) =

2004 single by Bloc Party

Single by Bloc Party

from the album Silent Alarm
- B-side: "Skeleton"
- Released: 25 October 2004
- Genre: Indie rock; garage rock
- Length: 3:40
- Label: Wichita
- Songwriters: Russell Lissack; Gordon Moakes; Kele Okereke; Matt Tong
- Producers: Bloc Party; Paul Epworth

Bloc Party singles chronology
"Little Thoughts/Tulips" (2004)	"Helicopter" (2004)	"Tulips" (2005)

Audio sample
- 30-second excerpt of "Helicopter".: file; help

"Helicopter" is a song by English rock band Bloc Party, originally released as a stand-alone single in the UK in October 2004 and appeared later on the Little Thoughts EP; it was released two years later as a single from their debut album, Silent Alarm, in the US. The song received acclaim, reaching number 26 on the UK Singles Chart but failing to chart on the US Hot 100. It did however chart on the US Billboard Hot Singles Sales chart. Various remixes of the song have been produced. The song was included in the music video games Guitar Hero III: Legends of Rock, Marc Ecko's Getting Up: Contents Under Pressure, Burnout Revenge, FIFA 06, FIFA 23, Colin McRae DiRT 2 and the episode "Alma Matter" from the sixth season of The Crown.

== Composition ==
"Helicopter" is an indie rock and garage rock song, written by all band members prior to their debut studio album, Silent Alarm. Composed in B minor, it was written in common time and has a quick tempo of 171 beats per minute. The main riff was adapted from "Set The House Ablaze", a song by The Jam featured on the 1980 album Sound Affects.

The song's critical references to the United States, and lines such as "just like his dad – the same mistakes", led to journalists believing that the song was an attack on George W. Bush, whose father George H. W. Bush had also led American military intervention in the Middle East. Okereke denied these suggestions in an interview with Pitchfork in August 2005 saying "It's frustrating that people attribute something to certain songs and that's not what they're about at all. [...] It's kinda patronizing".

== Music video ==
The official video is displayed in black and white and shows the band playing in an old, empty house, intercut with surreal imagery. It has received the second-most views of any of Bloc Party's songs on YouTube, gaining over 39 million views.

== Track listings ==
UK 7-inch

1. "Helicopter"
2. "Skeleton"

UK CD

1. "Helicopter"
2. "Always New Depths"
3. "Tulips" (Minotaur Shock mix)

US CD

1. "Helicopter" (Diplo remix)
2. "Helicopter" (Weird Science remix featuring Peaches)
3. "Helicopter" (Whitey remix)
4. "Helicopter" (Original version)

US 12-inch

1. "Helicopter" (Diplo remix)
2. "Helicopter" (Weird Science remix featuring Peaches)

== Charts ==
Chart (2004–06)	Peak position
Sweden (Hitlistan)	51
UK Singles (Official Charts)	26
U.S. Hot Singles Sales (Billboard)	34

== Certifications ==
Region	Certification	Certified units/sales
United Kingdom (BPI)	Gold	400,000^{‡}
^{‡} Sales+streaming figures based on certification alone.
