= Chiff-Chaffs and Willow Warblers =

Studio album by Minotaur Shock
- Released: 2001
- Genre: Electronica, IDM
- Length: 47:18
- Label: Melodic
- Producer: David Edwards

Minotaur Shock chronology
Chiff-Chaffs and Willow Warblers (2001)	Rinse (2003)

Professional ratings
Review scores
Source	Rating
Almost Cool	7.5/10 stars
Pitchfork Media	(7.4/10)

Chiff-Chaffs and Willow Warblers is the debut album by Minotaur Shock, released in 2001.

== Track listing ==
1. "Websites" – 0:42
2. "Roman Answer" – 4:37
3. "First to Back Down" – 4:25
4. "Moray Arrival" – 5:08
5. "Chance Anthem" – 2:34
6. "The Range" – 5:24
7. "Local Violin Shop" – 4:47
8. "Three Magpies" – 5:52
9. "There is a Dog" – 3:13
10. "Out of the Hot" – 5:30
11. "Primary" – 4:58

== Release history ==
Year	Label	Format	Catalog #
2001	Melodic	CD	009
2004	Schema	CD	9

== Personnel ==
David Edwards – Programming and Instruments
