= Lomax (band) =

English alternative rock band

- Origin: London, England
- Genre: Alternative rock
- Years active: 2002–2004
- Label: 93 Records
- Past members: Paul Epworth; Jon Meade; Rob Schultzberg

Lomax was an English alternative rock band from London, England.

The band released three singles and an album on the London-based independent record label, 93 Records. The album, A Symbol of Modern Living (2003), was praised by the Guardian and Drowned in Sound, among others.

Their vocalist/guitarist Paul Epworth works predominantly as a record producer, though enjoys working as a DJ. Meade is working on a solo entity, entitled The Sex Act, with a single "Builders of Men/Modern Dance" released on Destructible Records. Schultzberg is also working on solo material.

== Members ==
- Paul Epworth – lead vocals and guitar
- Jon Meade – bass and backing vocals
- Robert Schultzberg – drums

== Albums ==
- A Symbol of Modern Living
  - Release date: 10 Nov. 2003
  - Produced by Lomax
  - CD (93CD02), LP (93LP02):
    1. "The Bodies of Journalists"
    2. "Brought To Rights"
    3. "Arnstein’s Ladder"
    4. "When The Pressure’s On"
    5. "Anglicized"
    6. "Modern Life"
    7. "Knuckleheads"
    8. "Principles"
    9. "An End"
    10. "Reiterator"

== Singles ==
- "Anglicized" / "Last Meal For Jeff" (December 2002)
- "An End" / "Brought To Rights"
- "Modern Life" (October 2003)
- "Reiterator" (Phones Mix) – promo only
