= Maritime (album) =

Studio album by Minotaur Shock
- Released: 13 June 2005
- Genre: Electronic, folktronica
- Length: 52:39
- Label: 4AD

Minotaur Shock chronology
Rinse (2003)	Maritime (2005)	Amateur Dramatics (2008)

Professional ratings
Aggregate scores
Source	Rating
Metacritic	76/100
Review scores
Source	Rating
AllMusic	4.5/5 stars
Drowned in Sound	6/10
The Guardian	4/5 stars
Pitchfork Media	6.2/10
PopMatters	7/10 stars
Stylus Magazine	C+

Maritime is an album by Minotaur Shock, released in 2005 via 4AD. At Metacritic, which assigns a normalised rating out of 100 to reviews from mainstream critics, Maritime received an average score of 76, based on 15 reviews, indicating "generally favorable reviews".

== Track listing ==
1. "Muesli" – 3:06
2. "(She's In) Dry Dock Now" – 3:56
3. "Vigo Bay" – 4:22
4. "Six Foolish Fishermen" – 3:54
5. "Hilly" – 6:33
6. "Twosley" – 4:05
7. "Somebody Once Told Me It Existed But They Never Found It" – 6:00
8. "Luck Shield" – 5:42
9. "Mistaken Tourist" – 5:17
10. "The Broads" – 4:07
11. "Four Magpies" – 5:37
