= Voyager (Paul Epworth album) =

Studio album by Paul Epworth
- Released: 11 September 2020
- Genre: Pop rap
- Length: 58:15
- Label: Columbia
- Producers: Paul Epworth; Mike Dean

Singles from Voyager
- 1. "Voyager" Released: 18 October 2019; 2. "Space Inc." Released: 25 July 2020; 3. "Love Galaxy" Released: 6 May 2020; 4. "Mars & Venus" Released: 4 September 2020

Professional ratings
Aggregate scores
Source	Rating
Metacritic	67/100
Review scores
Source	Rating
AllMusic	4/5 stars
Clash	4/10
DIY	2.5/5 stars
musicOMH	3/5 stars

Voyager is the debut studio album by British record producer and musician Paul Epworth. It was released on 11 September 2020 through Columbia Records. A concept album about space inspired by science fiction films, Voyager includes collaborations with Ishmael, Elle Yaya, Lil Silva, Vince Staples, Ty Dolla Sign, Kool Keith, Jay Electronica, Bibi Bourelly and Lianne La Havas. The tracks "Voyager", "Space Inc.", "Mars & Venus" and "Love Galaxy" were released in advance of the album.

== Background ==
After over 15 years of working as a producer on other artists' albums, Voyager is Epworth's debut project under his own name. He began work on the album in 2015, and finished it in 2019. Epworth acknowledged that to make an "ostentatious and overblown" album is "a bit of a cliché as a producer" but was inspired by his love of science fiction films to make a "'70s space concept album [...] frame[d ...] in a modern way" with vocals from both singers and rappers.

== Music ==
The album has been described as primarily pop rap, with inspiration from soul and funk, as well as observed to have an "amalgamation of modern styles – some house, some trap, some mid-tempo disco – and tunes that are poppy without seeming all that concerned about tight, stream-friendly structures".

== Critical reception ==
Neil Z. Yeung of AllMusic described the album as a "lush interstellar journey", a "cross-genre hybrid" and a "headphone-friendly trip that expands the mind" that incorporates "top-notch production, artistic collaboration, and devotion to the space-age vibe", concluding that it "results in a satisfying and unexpected gem". Ben Devlin of musicOMH felt that while there are "some interesting sonic tricks" on the album, the vocal guests' "performances are of varying quality" and Voyager ultimately lacks "the memorability or consistency to justify stepping into the limelight when semi-anonymity has served him [Epworth] so well".

Writing for DIY, Bella Martin judged Voyager to be "a studio folly of sorts, (unsurprisingly) impeccable in sound but meandering without direction for the most part", questioning whether the album is a "trip worth taking" when "where, say, fellow magpies Gorillaz integrate their guests' styles with mostly wild success, often the turns here feel like basic seasoning, as the tracks blend into each other". Reviewing the album for Clash, Sidney Franklyn wrote that Epworth's "love affair with the retro electronics of the 1980s [...] ends up feeling less like the 80s, and more like last decade's 80s nostalgia" and that without the "intergalactic frills", the album "looks no different to your by-the-numbers pop record".

== Track listing ==
Voyager track listing
No.	Title	Writer(s)	Producer(s)	Length
1.	"Mars & Venus" (featuring Vince Staples, Ishmael and Elle Yaya)	Paul Epworth; Staples; Joshua Ishmael Logan	Epworth; Harry Edwards^{[a]}	3:38
2.	"Hyperspace" (featuring Ishmael)	Logan	Epworth; Edwards^{[a]}	4:26
3.	"OBX" (featuring Lil Silva)	Epworth; TJ Carter; Edwards	Epworth	3:30
4.	"Transmission"	Epworth; Alan Bergman; Marilyn Bergman; Michel Legrand	Epworth	0:45
5.	"Voyager"	Epworth; A. Bergman; M. Bergman; Legrand	Epworth; Edwards	8:17
6.	"Cosmos" (featuring Ty Dolla Sign)	Epworth; Tyrone Griffin Jr.; Mike Dean	Epworth; Edwards^{[a]}; Emil Nikolaisen^{[a]}; Hans-Peter Lindstrøm^{[a]}	3:49
7.	"Distant Planets" (featuring Kool Keith)	Epworth; Edwards	Epworth; Edwards^{[a]}	4:44
8.	"The Eternal Now"	Epworth; Edwards; Riley MacIntyre	Epworth; Edwards^{[a]}; MacIntyre^{[a]}	0:49
9.	"Binaural Trip" (featuring Bibi Bourelly and Ishmael)	Epworth; Badriia Bourelly; Logan; Jerry Goldsmith; Kwes Darko	Epworth; Edwards^{[a]}	4:40
10.	"Twenty Second Century" (featuring Lianne La Havas)	Epworth; Lianne Barnes; Nikolaj Torp Larsen	Epworth; Edwards^{[a]}	3:47
11.	"Love Galaxy" (featuring Jay Electronica and Lil Silva)	Epworth; Elpadaro F. Electronica Allah; Carter; Edwards; Jazon Kawu-Eugenio	Epworth; Nikolaisen^{[a]}; Lindstrøm^{[a]}	4:57
12.	"Time & Space"	Epworth; Sally Herbert; Walt Whitman	Epworth; Everton Nelson^{[a]}	1:54
13.	"Where Do We Come From?" (featuring Ishmael and Elle Yaya)	Epworth; Logan; Jessie Reyez; Larsen	Epworth; Edwards^{[a]}	6:09
14.	"Space Inc." (featuring Ishmael)	Epworth; Logan; Larsen; Ruban Nielson; Dean; Sun Ra	Epworth; Dean^{[a]}; Edwards^{[a]}	4:56
15.	"Epilogue"	Epworth; Larsen; Richard Pelletier; Jeremiah Ryan; James Apt; John MacLean	Epworth	1:54
Total length:				58:15

Notes

- ^{^[a]} denotes an additional producer.
