= Little Thoughts/Tulips =

2004 single by Bloc Party

Single by Bloc Party

from the album Little Thoughts
- B-side: "Storm and Stress"
- Released: 12 July 2004
- Length: 3:30 ("Little Thoughts"); 3:39 ("Tulips")
- Label: Wichita
- Songwriter(s): Bloc Party
- Producer(s): Paul Epworth

Bloc Party singles chronology
"Banquet/Staying Fat" (2004)	"Little Thoughts/Tulips" (2004)	"Helicopter" (2004)

"Little Thoughts"/"Tulips" are two songs by English rock band Bloc Party. They were released together as a double A-side single on 12 July 2004 from the band's second extended play, Little Thoughts. The track "Little Thoughts" later appeared on certain versions and re-releases of the band's debut studio album, Silent Alarm. "Tulips" was later released as a standalone single on 25 January 2005 in the US only. The single peaked at number 38 on the UK Singles Chart and number 53 on the Swedish Singles Chart.

== Track listing ==
=== CD ===
- Wichita / WEBB067SCD
1. "Little Thoughts"
2. "Tulips"
3. "Banquet (Phones Disco Edit)"

=== 7" vinyl ===
- Wichita / WEBB067S (limited edition blue vinyl)
1. "Little Thoughts"
2. "Storm and Stress"

== Charts ==
Chart (2004)	Peak position
Sweden (Sverigetopplistan)	53
UK Singles (OCC)	38
