= Rinse (album) =

Studio album by Minotaur Shock
- Released: 10 November 2003
- Recorded: 2002
- Genre: Electronica, IDM
- Length: 62:16
- Label: Melodic

Minotaur Shock chronology
Chiff-Chaffs and Willow Warblers (2001)	Rinse (2003)	Maritime (2005)

Professional ratings
Review scores
Source	Rating
Allmusic	3/5 stars

Rinse is an album by Minotaur Shock, released in 2003.

== Track listing ==
1. "46 Tops" – 3:25
2. "Stack On Rat" – 4:15
3. "Don't Be A Slave To No Computer" – 7:00
4. "Let Me Out" – 3:54
5. "The Downs" – 4:50
6. "Albert Park Music" – 9:50
7. "Motoring Britain" – 6:14
8. "Avon Ranger" – 6:25
9. "Repertor" – 4:17
10. "Rockpoolin'" – 5:44
11. "Lady Came From Battic Wharf (W/Sui Said Love)" – 6:22
