= Two More Years =

Single by Bloc Party

from the album Silent Alarm (re-release) and Two More Years EP
- Released: 3 October 2005
- Length: 4:28 (Full Length Version); 4:07 (Single Version); 3:44 (Edit)
- Label: Wichita
- Songwriters: Russell Lissack, Gordon Moakes, Kele Okereke, Matt Tong
- Producers: Paul Epworth; Bloc Party

Bloc Party singles chronology
"Pioneers" (2005)	"Two More Years" (2005)	"The Prayer" (2007)

"Two More Years" is a single by Bloc Party. It reached number 7 in the UK Singles Chart, making it the second of the band's top ten hits. Originally a non-album single, it was later added as a bonus track on re-released versions of the group's debut album, Silent Alarm.

== Track listing ==
All lyrics by Kele Okereke (except where noted). All music composed by Bloc Party (Kele Okereke, Russell Lissack, Gordon Moakes & Matt Tong). All tracks produced by Paul Epworth and Bloc Party.

=== 7": Wichita / WEBB095S (UK) ===
1. "Two More Years"
2. "Hero"

The UK 7" was pressed onto green vinyl.

=== CD: Wichita / WEBB95SCD (UK) ===
1. "Two More Years" (4:28)
2. "Banquet" (The Streets Mix) (3:47) (lyrics by Mike Skinner & Kele Okereke)

=== CD: Wichita / WEBB95SCDX (UK) ===
1. "Two More Years" (4:28)
2. "Hero" (4:08)
3. "Two More Years" (video)
4. "Banquet" (The Streets Mix - video) (lyrics by Mike Skinner & Kele Okereke)

=== CD: Wichita / WEBB095RMX (UK Promo) ===
1. "Two More Years" (MSTRKRFT Mix) (4:12)

=== CD: V2 / V2CP 243-244 (Japan) ===
Two More Years EP + Silent Alarm Remixed

CD1

1. "Two More Years" (4:07)
2. "Two More Years" (Edit) (3:44)
3. "Banquet" (The Streets Mix) (3:47) (lyrics by Mike Skinner & Kele Okereke)
4. "Hero" (4:08)
5. "Two More Years" (video)
6. "Banquet" (The Streets Mix) (video)
7. "The Pioneers" (video)

CD2

Same as Silent Alarm Remixed UK tracklisting, but with "Banquet" (Cornelius Remix) as a bonus track.

== Charts ==
=== Weekly charts ===
Chart (2005)	Peak position
UK Singles Chart	7
UK Indie Singles Chart	1

=== Year-end charts ===
Chart (2005)	Position
UK Singles (Official Charts Company)	149

== Other appearances ==
- The Saturday Sessions: The Dermot O'Leary Show (2007, EMI)
