= Little Thoughts (EP) =

EP by Bloc Party
- Released: 1 December 2004
- Recorded: 2004
- Genre: Post-punk revival, indie rock
- Length: 22:07
- Label: V2
- Producer: Paul Epworth

Bloc Party chronology
Bloc Party (2004)	Little Thoughts (2004)	Silent Alarm (2005)

Singles from Little Thoughts EP
- 1. "Little Thoughts/Tulips" Released: 12 July 2004

The Little Thoughts EP is a compilation EP of previously UK-only Bloc Party releases, released on 1 December 2004 in Japan. It combines the UK single "Little Thoughts" with b-sides from the "Helicopter" single. The record marked the band's second Japanese EP and was released ahead of their solo concert in the country that December.

== Reception ==
In his review for Listen Japan, Dai Onojima was positive of the EP, highlighting the "glitch sounds" present in some of the tracks as adding some sophistication to the sound design. Additionally, Onojima wrote that while Bloc Party demonstrated influences from Joy Division, The Jam and Gang of Four, they also showed that they were more than merely an imitator of these groups.

== Track listing ==
No.	Title	Length
1.	"Little Thoughts"	3:30
2.	"Tulips"	3:39
3.	"Storm & Stress"	2:46
4.	"Helicopter"	3:42
5.	"Skeleton"	3:16
6.	"Tulips (Minotaur Shock Remix)"	5:14

The EP also contains the "Little Thoughts" video as enhanced content.
