= The Prayer (Bloc Party song) =

Single by Bloc Party

from the album A Weekend in the City
- B-side: "We Were Lovers"; "England"; "Version 2.0"; Remixes
- Released: 29 January 2007
- Recorded: 2006
- Genre: Alternative dance; indietronica; post-punk revival
- Length: 3:44
- Label: Wichita
- Songwriters: Russell Lissack, Gordon Moakes, Kele Okereke, Matt Tong
- Producer: Jacknife Lee

Bloc Party singles chronology
"Two More Years" (2005)	"The Prayer" (2007)	"I Still Remember" (2007)

"The Prayer" is a song by English rock band Bloc Party. It was released as the lead single from their second studio album, A Weekend in the City, except in the U.S. where it is the second single. "I Still Remember" was the first song from the album to be released in North America. It was released by Wichita Recordings on 29 January 2007 and is the band's highest-charting single worldwide. The lyrics deal with drug use in nightclubs and party environments. Band frontman Kele Okereke says he was inspired to write the song after hearing Busta Rhymes' song "Touch It". He also described the song as having a "crunk-like" effect. A cover version of "The Prayer" by KT Tunstall is included in Radio 1's Live Lounge – Volume 2, and on her single "If Only".

== Lyrics ==
The lyrics of the song deal with the use of club drugs such as MDMA and Ketamine in nightclubs and parties. The song deals with the effects of such drugs on the human body through the eyes of a user, who asks, "Is it so wrong, to want rewarding?/To want more than is given to you?".

== Music video ==
A video for the song was released on 5 December 2006, and was directed by Walter Stern, also known for directing videos by Massive Attack, The Prodigy and most notably The Verve's "Bitter Sweet Symphony". In the video, all members of Bloc Party are at a nightclub (which, in reality, is Café 1001 in London). It follows them throughout the night even though they do not appear to be doing much. Okereke is the only one who actually gets up and goes around. The other members just sit around while Okereke goes off on his own journey, whilst cigarette burn effects and other visual distortions appear.

== In popular culture ==
The song was featured in the racing video game Project Gotham Racing 4 (also required for the Tonight Make Me Unstoppable achievement, which requires you to finish a race in second place with this song playing.), while the Does It Offend You, Yeah? remix was featured on Need for Speed: ProStreet. The song was also featured in the general trailer of the sixth season of Smallville in March and April 2007. The song was also featured in the soundtrack for the video game NHL 2K8.

== Track listing ==
=== 7" vinyls ===
- Wichita / WEBB118S (UK) (in gatefold sleeve which houses second 7")

All tracks are written by Bloc Party.

No.	Title	Producer(s)	Length
1.	"The Prayer"	Jacknife Lee	3:46
2.	"England"	Jacknife Lee	4:15

- Wichita / WEBB118SX (UK)

All tracks are written by Bloc Party.

No.	Title	Producer(s)	Length
1.	"The Prayer"	Jacknife Lee	3:46
2.	"Version 2.0"	Eliot James	3:21

=== CD ===
- Wichita / WEBB118SCD (UK)

All tracks are written by Bloc Party.

No.	Title	Producer(s)	Length
1.	"The Prayer"	Jacknife Lee	3:46
2.	"We Were Lovers"	Jacknife Lee	4:14
3.	"The Prayer (Phones Metal Jackin' Remix)"	Jacknife Lee; Paul Epworth	5:03

=== Remixes ===
No.	Title	Length
1.	"The Prayer (Break & Silent Witness Remix)"	5:42
2.	"The Prayer (Phones Metal Jackin' Remix)"	5:03
3.	"The Prayer (Para One Remix)"	6:04
4.	"The Prayer (Does It Offend You, Yeah? Remix)"	4:17

==== Bonus download track ====
No.	Title	Length
5.	"The Prayer (Hadouken! Remix)"	2:37

== Charts ==
Chart (2007)	Peak position
Australia (ARIA)	20
Belgium (Ultratip Bubbling Under Flanders)	4
Belgium (Ultratip Bubbling Under Wallonia)	8
European Hot 100 Singles (Billboard)	14
Germany (Official German Charts)	81
Ireland (IRMA)	18
UK Singles (Official Charts)	4
