= The Pioneers (song) =

2005 single by Bloc Party

Single by Bloc Party

from the album Silent Alarm
- Released: 18 July 2005
- Genre: Indie rock; alternative rock
- Length: 3:35
- Label: Wichita
- Songwriters: Russell Lissack, Gordon Moakes, Kele Okereke, Matt Tong
- Producer: Paul Epworth

Bloc Party singles chronology
"Banquet" (2005)	"The Pioneers" (2005)	"Two More Years" (2005)

"The Pioneers" is a song by Bloc Party from their debut album, Silent Alarm (2005). It was released in the United Kingdom by Wichita Recordings on 18 July 2005 and reached number 18 in the UK Singles Chart. On some editions of the album it was called "Pioneers". Each copy of the single is numbered in the top left corner.

== Music video ==
The animated music video was made by the company Mini Vegas and was directed by Aoife McArdle.

It begins with the band performing the song onstage. Guitarist Russell Lissack cuts his finger on one of the strings, which lands on a beetle and causes it to grow huge. The band are transported on the back of the beetle to a land of giant flowers, when bassist Gordon Moakes falls off the beetle. The rest of the band jump after him and land on the flowers, which brings them down to the ground where they are surrounded by pig-headed iguanas. They spot a crashed spaceship and escape from a pig-headed iguana to get to it. Inside, Russell accidentally sits on a console, which teleports the band to a futuristic city. They get accosted by smoke, which transports them again to a desert, where they spot two towers and make their way to them. The towers are revealed to be giant pistols, which fires the band into the sky. They retrieve their instruments in the air and appear back on stage.

== Track listings ==
CD: Wichita / WEBB088SCD (UK)

1. "The Pioneers"
2. "Plans" (Acoustic)
3. "Storm and Stress" (Acoustic)

7-inch: Wichita / WEBB088S (UK)

1. "The Pioneers"
2. "The Pioneers" (Bloc Party vs The Mystery Jets)

DVD: Wichita / WEBB088DVD (UK)

1. "The Pioneers"
2. "Banquet" (Original Video)

== Charts ==
Chart (2005)	Peak position
Scottish Singles Sales (Official Charts)	21
UK Singles (Official Charts)	18
