= Paul Epworth =

English record producer and musician

- Also known as: Phones; Epic Man
- Born: Paul Richard Epworth; 25 July 1974 (age 52); Bishop's Stortford, England
- Genres: Indie rock, punk rock, hip hop, pop, dance
- Occupations: Record producer, songwriter, musician, remixer
- Instruments: Drums, percussion, bass, guitar, keyboards, trumpet
- Years active: 2000–present
- Label: Columbia
- Website: paulepworth.com

Paul Richard Epworth (born 25 July 1974) is an English record producer and musician. He has worked with artists including Adele, Florence and the Machine, Rihanna, Bloc Party, and Maxïmo Park. He is a member of the Music Producers Guild and is the founder and owner of the independent record label Wolf Tone, which has released music from Glass Animals, Rosie Lowe, and The Horrors.

Epworth has won the Brit Award for British Producer of the Year three times, the most recent in 2015. He has won seven Grammy Awards, as well as the Academy Award for Best Original Song for "Skyfall". He released his debut studio album Voyager in 2020.

== Early life ==
Paul Richard Epworth was born in Bishop's Stortford, Hertfordshire, on 25 July 1974.

== Career ==
=== Lomax ===
From 2002 to 2004, Epworth provided lead vocals and guitar for the band Lomax. He later remixed two songs from the band's catalogue – "Reiterator" and "Modern Life".

=== Remixing ===
Epworth is well known for his remix work under the name "Phones". He began to gain recognition with this moniker based on his work with Bloc Party's track "Banquet"; he has since provided remix work for New Order, U2, P-Diddy, Goldfrapp, Nine Inch Nails, Simian Mobile Disco, The Streets, Interpol, Tom Vek, Death from Above 1979, Annie and Coldplay. His debut of original material under the Phones name, "Sharpen the Knives"/"Worryin", was released on French label Kitsuné in November 2006. In 2008, he announced he had stopped using the Phones name but has said he continues to remix anonymously.

In early 2006, Epworth began making music under another alias, 'Epic Man'. His debut single, "More Is Enough", featured Plan B and was featured on the soundtrack for Need For Speed: Pro Street and was released on Good & Evil Records, a subsidiary of 679 Recordings. He has since returned to his Phones name and there are no known plans to release under Epic Man again.

=== Production and writing ===
In 2004–05, Epworth produced four critically acclaimed releases, including two Mercury Music Prize nominations in Silent Alarm by Bloc Party and A Certain Trigger by Maxïmo Park, the bulk of The Futureheads eponymous debut (including the hit Kate Bush cover "Hounds Of Love"), and Capture/Release by The Rakes as well as singles by Babyshambles and The Long Blondes. He also wrote and produced tracks for British rappers, Kano ("Don't Know Why") and Plan B ("No Good" and "Where You From") This was followed in 2006 by production work on Pieces of the People We Love by The Rapture and the debut album by French band Black Strobe, entitled Burn Your Own Church.

In 2007, Epworth began to contribute more co-writing credits alongside his production. For example, his production on the number one debut album Made of Bricks by Kate Nash included a writing credit on the hit single "Foundations" (for which he was nominated for an Ivor Novello songwriters award.) In 2008, Epworth produced much of Sam Sparro's eponymous debut album which entered the UK album charts at number 4 and the Primal Scream single, "Can't Go Back", along with the title track of their recent album Beautiful Future. Epworth also completed production duties on much of the new Bloc Party record, Intimacy and co-wrote and produced Friendly Fires track "Jump In The Pool".

Early 2009 saw Epworth co-writing and recording Jack Peñate's critically lauded second album Everything Is New including the singles "Tonight's Today" and "Be the One". He also co-wrote and produced tracks for Florence and the Machine's debut album Lungs, including the hit single "Rabbit Heart (Raise It Up)" along with the album tracks "Howl", "Cosmic Love", "Hurricane Drunk" and "Blinding". He also worked further with Friendly Fires on a single version of the track "Skeleton Boy" and produced the forthcoming single by The Big Pink, "Stop the World". In February 2009 he won best newcomer at the inaugural Music Producers' Guild Awards. In Spring 2009, Epworth co-produced another single with The Big Pink entitled "Dominos", and a new Friendly Fires single "Kiss of Life".

Summer 2009 brought Epworth his third and fourth Mercury music prize nomination in the shape of Florence and the Machine's Lungs and Friendly Fires' eponymous debut. He also finished album tracks for Norwegian pop artist Annie for her delayed album Don't Stop; wrote the "Zingolo" for Cadbury's "Fair Trade" advert, featuring Ghanaian MC Tinny; and mixed the track "Silva & Grimes" for Holy Fuck's Latin lp. He finished up the year working on new tracks by London MC/Singer Plan B for his number 1 album The Defamation Of Strickland Banks including the top 10 single "Stay Too Long", and tracks for Canadian duo Crystal Castles (including single Celestica), writing with Grammy winner Adele, singer Sky Ferreira and producing a single version of album track "Tonight" with The Big Pink.

In February 2010, Epworth won both the Brit Award and the Music Producers' Guild Award for Producer Of The Year and also won Music Week's Producer of the Year Award in April.

Early 2010 saw Epworth deliver tracks for London band Chapel Club's forthcoming LP and begin work on both Friendly Fires' and Florence and the Machine's second LPs. He also signed a solo deal with Columbia Records, with no album forthcoming until 2019. Epworth added his production hand to Primary 1's album, including lead single "Princess". Summer 2010 saw him provide production on two versions of Cee Lo Green's cover of Band of Horses' "No One's Gonna Love You", and for the single "It's OK".

Late 2010 and early 2011 saw the release of the acclaimed Epworth co-written and produced worldwide number one single "Rolling in the Deep" from Adele's 21. The album features three Epworth co-writes with Adele, which he produced "I'll Be Waiting", while "He Won't Go" was produced by Rick Rubin. Summer 2011 saw Epworth producing The Big Pink's Future This and the critically acclaimed Ceremonials by Florence and the Machine.

On 12 February 2012 at the 54th Grammy Awards, he won four Grammy Awards for Producer of the Year, Album of the Year (Adele's 21), and Song of the Year and Record of the Year (for "Rolling in the Deep"). Later that year, Epworth founded the independent record label Wolf Tone. One of the first acts signed to the label was Glass Animals. Wolf Tone would later sign artists including Rosie Lowe, The Horrors, Plaitum, Elle Watson, Art School Girlfriend, Harry Edwards, Lunch Money Life, and AV Dummy.

In 2013, Epworth and Adele received the Golden Globe Award for Best Original Song at the 70th Golden Globe Awards for the song "Skyfall". Epworth and Adele also received the Academy Award for Best Original Song at the 85th Academy Awards for "Skyfall".

In late 2015, Adele released her third album 25, which features two tracks co-written and produced by Epworth, "I Miss You" and "Sweetest Devotion". 25 won for Album of the Year at the 59th Grammy Awards.

In 2016, Epworth produced two tracks for The Stone Roses, "All for One" and "Beautiful Thing", which he also mixed. He served as executive producer on the Glass Animals album How to Be a Human Being, which was released by Wolf Tone. Paul also co-wrote and produced the Usher track "Chains" featuring Nas and Bibi Bourelly.

On 30 August 2019, he released the first track from a new project to be released via Columbia Records.

In September 2020, Epworth released his debut studio album Voyager. Voyager draws on Epworth's love of house and cosmic disco, influenced by and channelled through a heavy filter of 70s sci fi. In the same month, Epworth gave an interview to NME in which he talks extensively about his long-standing working relationship with Adele.

On 31 March 2025, the Music Producers Guild (MPG) announced the recipients of its annual awards. Paul Epworth was named the recipient of the MPG Icon Award, joining previous honorees such as Bob Clearmountain and Alan Moulder.

=== The Church Studios ===
In October 2013, Epworth bought The Church Studios, a recording studio in the Crouch End area of London. The studio had previously been owned by David A. Stewart in the 1980s and 1990s, and was used to record music by Eurythmics, Bob Dylan and Radiohead, among others. David Gray then owned the studio until Epworth took over in 2013. The Church studios has three working commercial studios, all refurbished by the Walters-Storyk Design Group and Miloco builds. Epworth had a 72-Channel Vintage EMI Neve Console installed in studio 1, and a Solid State Logic console installed in studio 2. Since Epworth's ownership of the Church Studios, notable artists such as Mumford and Sons, U2, Adele, Frank Ocean, and London Grammar have recorded there.

== Discography ==
=== Studio albums ===
- Voyager (2020)

=== Singles ===
==== (as Phones) ====
- 2006: "Sharpen the Knives / Worryin'"

==== (as Epic Man) ====
- 2006: "More Is Enough" (feat. Plan B)

==== (as Paul Epworth) ====
- 2019: "Voyager" b/w "Voyager 2" (feat. Matty)
- 2020: "Love Galaxy" (feat. Jay Electronica, Lil Silva, and Dave Bayley)

=== Songwriting and production credits ===
Title	Year	Artist	Album	Songwriter	Producer			
Title	Year	Artist	Album	Songwriter	Primary	Secondary	Additional	Vocal
"Banquet"	2004	Bloc Party	Bloc Party EP		check			
"Little Thoughts"	2004	Bloc Party	Little Thoughts EP		check			
"Tulips"	2004	Bloc Party	Little Thoughts EP		check			
"Le Garage"	2004	The Futureheads	The Futureheads		check			
"Robot"	2004	The Futureheads	The Futureheads		check			
"Decent Days and Nights"	2004	The Futureheads	The Futureheads		check			
"Meantime"	2004	The Futureheads	The Futureheads		check			
"Danger of the Water"	2004	The Futureheads	The Futureheads		check			
"Carnival Kids"	2004	The Futureheads	The Futureheads		check			
"He Knows"	2004	The Futureheads	The Futureheads		check			
"Stupid and Shallow"	2004	The Futureheads	The Futureheads		check			
"Hounds of Love"	2004	The Futureheads	The Futureheads		check			
"Man Ray"	2004	The Futureheads	The Futureheads		check			
"The Coast Is Always Changing"	2004	Maxïmo Park	A Certain Trigger		check			
"Helicopter"	2004	Bloc Party	Little Thoughts EP		check			
"Skeleton"	2004	Bloc Party	Little Thoughts EP		check			
"So Here We Are"	2005	Bloc Party	Silent Alarm		check			
"Positive Tension"	2005	Bloc Party	Silent Alarm		check			
"Like Eating Glass"	2005	Bloc Party	Silent Alarm		check			
"Blue Light"	2005	Bloc Party	Silent Alarm		check			
"She's Hearing Voices"	2005	Bloc Party	Silent Alarm		check			
"This Modern Love"	2005	Bloc Party	Silent Alarm		check			
"Pioneers"	2005	Bloc Party	Silent Alarm		check			
"Price of Gas"	2005	Bloc Party	Silent Alarm		check			
"Luno"	2005	Bloc Party	Silent Alarm		check			
"Plans"	2005	Bloc Party	Silent Alarm		check			
"Compliments"	2005	Bloc Party	Silent Alarm		check			
"Apply Some Pressure"	2005	Maxïmo Park	A Certain Trigger		check			
"Graffiti"	2005	Maxïmo Park	A Certain Trigger		check			
"Signal and Sign"	2005	Maxïmo Park	A Certain Trigger		check			
"Postcard of a Painting"	2005	Maxïmo Park	A Certain Trigger		check			
"Going Missing"	2005	Maxïmo Park	A Certain Trigger		check			
"I Want You to Stay"	2005	Maxïmo Park	A Certain Trigger		check			
"Limassol"	2005	Maxïmo Park	A Certain Trigger		check			
"The Night I Lost My Mind"	2005	Maxïmo Park	A Certain Trigger		check			
"Once, A Glimpse"	2005	Maxïmo Park	A Certain Trigger		check			
"Now I'm All Over the Shop"	2005	Maxïmo Park	A Certain Trigger		check			
"Acrobat"	2005	Maxïmo Park	A Certain Trigger		check			
"Kiss You Better"	2005	Maxïmo Park	A Certain Trigger		check			
"I Don't Know Why"	2005	Kano	Home Sweet Home		check			
"Two More Years"	2005	Bloc Party	Non-album single		check			
"Hero"	2005	Bloc Party	Non-album single		check			
"Where Ya From?"	2006	Plan B	Who Needs Actions When; You Got Words	check		check		
"No Good"	2006	Plan B	Who Needs Actions When; You Got Words	check	check			
"Get Myself Into It"	2006	The Rapture	Pieces of the People We Love		check			
"Don Gon Do It"	2006	The Rapture	Pieces of the People We Love		check			
"First Gear"	2006	The Rapture	Pieces of the People We Love		check			
"The Devil"	2006	The Rapture	Pieces of the People We Love		check			
"Whoo! Alright-Yeah... Uh Huh"	2006	The Rapture	Pieces of the People We Love		check			
"Down for So Long"	2006	The Rapture	Pieces of the People We Love		check			
"The Sound"	2006	The Rapture	Pieces of the People We Love		check			
"Live in Sunshine"	2006	The Rapture	Pieces of the People We Love		check			
"Shooting Star"	2006	The Rapture	Pieces of the People We Love		check			
"On and On"	2006	The Rapture	Pieces of the People We Love		check			
"Turn It Up"	2006	Alesha Dixon	Fired Up	check	check			
"Foundations"	2007	Kate Nash	Made of Bricks	check	check			
"Brenn Di Ega Kjerke"	2007	Black Strobe	Burn Your Own Church		check			
"Shining Bright Star"	2007	Black Strobe	Burn Your Own Church		check			
"Girl Next Door"	2007	Black Strobe	Burn Your Own Church		check			
"Blood Shot Eyes"	2007	Black Strobe	Burn Your Own Church		check			
"Now What You Need"	2007	Black Strobe	Burn Your Own Church		check			
"I'm a Man"	2007	Black Strobe	Burn Your Own Church		check			
"Lady 13"	2007	Black Strobe	Burn Your Own Church		check			
"You Should Be"	2007	Black Strobe	Burn Your Own Church		check			
"Buzz Buzz Buzz"	2007	Black Strobe	Burn Your Own Church		check			
"Last Club on Earth"	2007	Black Strobe	Burn Your Own Church		check			
"Crave for Speed"	2007	Black Strobe	Burn Your Own Church		check			
"Play"	2007	Kate Nash	Made of Bricks		check			
"Mouthwash"	2007	Kate Nash	Made of Bricks		check			
"Dickhead"	2007	Kate Nash	Made of Bricks		check			
"Birds"	2007	Kate Nash	Made of Bricks		check			
"We Get On"	2007	Kate Nash	Made of Bricks		check			
"Mariella"	2007	Kate Nash	Made of Bricks		check			
"Shit Song"	2007	Kate Nash	Made of Bricks		check			
"Pumpkin Soup"	2007	Kate Nash	Made of Bricks	check	check			
"Skeleton Song"	2007	Kate Nash	Made of Bricks		check			
"Nicest Thing"	2007	Kate Nash	Made of Bricks		check			
"Merry Happy"	2007	Kate Nash	Made of Bricks		check			
"A is for Asthma"	2007	Kate Nash	Made of Bricks		check			
"Little Red"	2007	Kate Nash	Made of Bricks		check			
"Stitching Leggings"	2007	Kate Nash	Made of Bricks		check			
"Navy Taxi"	2007	Kate Nash	Made of Bricks		check			
"Habanera"	2007	Kate Nash	Made of Bricks		check			
"Halo"	2008	Bloc Party	Intimacy		check			
"Trojan Horse"	2008	Bloc Party	Intimacy		check			
"One Month Off"	2008	Bloc Party	Intimacy		check			
"Talons"	2008	Bloc Party	Intimacy		check			
"Better than Heaven"	2008	Bloc Party	Intimacy		check			
"Letter to My Son"	2008	Bloc Party	Intimacy		check			
"Tonight's Today"	2009	Jack Peñate	Everything Is New	check	check			
"Be the One"	2009	Jack Peñate	Everything Is New	check	check			
"Pull My Heart Away"	2009	Jack Peñate	Everything Is New	check	check			
"Everything is New"	2009	Jack Peñate	Everything Is New	check	check			
"So Near"	2009	Jack Peñate	Everything Is New		check			
"Every Glance"	2009	Jack Peñate	Everything Is New	check	check			
"Give Yourself Away"	2009	Jack Peñate	Everything Is New	check	check			
"Let's All Die"	2009	Jack Peñate	Everything Is New		check			
"Body Down"	2009	Jack Peñate	Everything Is New		check			
"Rabbit Heart (Raise It Up)"	2009	Florence + the Machine	Lungs	check	check			
"Howl"	2009	Florence + the Machine	Lungs	check	check			
"Cosmic Love"	2009	Florence + the Machine	Lungs		check			
"Hurricane Drunk"	2009	Florence + the Machine	Lungs				check	
"Blinding"	2009	Florence + the Machine	Lungs	check	check			
"Stay Too Long"	2010	Plan B	The Defamation of Strickland Banks		check			
"Writing's on the Wall"	2010	Plan B	The Defamation of Strickland Banks		check			
"Welcome to Hell"	2010	Plan B	The Defamation of Strickland Banks		check			
"Prayin'"	2010	Plan B	The Defamation of Strickland Banks		check			
"Celestica"	2010	Crystal Castles	II				check	
"I Am Made of Chalk"	2010	Crystal Castles	II					check
"It's OK"	2010	CeeLo Green	The Lady Killer			check		
"No One's Gonna Love You"	2010	CeeLo Green	The Lady Killer		check			
"Heavy in Your Arms"	2010	Florence + the Machine	The Twilight Saga: Eclipse OST	check	check			
"Rolling in the Deep"	2010	Adele	21	check	check			
"He Won't Go"	2011	Adele	21	check				
"I'll Be Waiting"	2011	Adele	21	check	check			
"Live Those Days Tonight"	2011	Friendly Fires	Pala	check	check			
"Blue Cassette"	2011	Friendly Fires	Pala				check	
"Hurting"	2011	Friendly Fires	Pala				check	
"Show Me Lights"	2011	Friendly Fires	Pala		check			
"Chimes"	2011	Friendly Fires	Pala		check			
"Call It What You Want"	2011	Foster the People	Torches	check	check			
"I Would Do Anything for You"	2011	Foster the People	Torches		check			
"Life on the Nickel"	2011	Foster the People	Torches	check	check			
"Sorry 4 the Wait"	2011	Lil Wayne	Sorry 4 the Wait		check			
"What the Water Gave Me"	2011	Florence + the Machine	Ceremonials		check			
"Shake It Out"	2011	Florence + the Machine	Ceremonials	check	check			
"Only If for a Night"	2011	Florence + the Machine	Ceremonials	check	check			
"Never Let Me Go"	2011	Florence + the Machine	Ceremonials	check	check			
"Breaking Down"	2011	Florence + the Machine	Ceremonials		check			
"Lover to Lover"	2011	Florence + the Machine	Ceremonials		check			
"No Light, No Light"	2011	Florence + the Machine	Ceremonials		check			
"Seven Devils"	2011	Florence + the Machine	Ceremonials	check	check			
"Heartlines"	2011	Florence + the Machine	Ceremonials	check	check			
"Spectrum (Say My Name)"	2011	Florence + the Machine	Ceremonials	check	check			
"All This and Heaven Too"	2011	Florence + the Machine	Ceremonials		check			
"Leave My Body"	2011	Florence + the Machine	Ceremonials	check	check			
"Strangeness and Charm"	2011	Florence + the Machine	Ceremonials	check	check			
"Bedroom Hymns"	2011	Florence + the Machine	Ceremonials		check			
"Ruby"	2012	Foster the People	Non-album single		check			
"Skyfall"	2012	Adele	Non-album single	check	check			
"Natalie"	2012	Bruno Mars	Unorthodox Jukebox	check		check		
"Save Us"	2013	Paul McCartney	New	check	check			
"Queenie Eye"	2013	Paul McCartney	New	check	check			
"Road"	2013	Paul McCartney	New	check	check			
"God's Help"	2013	Louis Mattrs	Beachy Head EP		check			
"Coming of Age"	2014	Foster the People	Supermodel	check	check			
"Pseudologia Fantastica"	2014	Foster the People	Supermodel	check	check			
"Magic"	2014	Coldplay	Ghost Stories		check			
"Best Friend"	2014	Foster the People	Supermodel		check			
"Are You What You Want to Be?"	2014	Foster the People	Supermodel		check			
"Ask Yourself"	2014	Foster the People	Supermodel		check			
"Nevermind"	2014	Foster the People	Supermodel	check	check			
"The Angelic Welcome of Mr. Jones"	2014	Foster the People	Supermodel		check			
"A Beginner's Guide to Destroying the Moon"	2014	Foster the People	Supermodel	check	check			
"Goats in Trees"	2014	Foster the People	Supermodel	check	check			
"The Truth"	2014	Foster the People	Supermodel		check			
"Fire Escape"	2014	Foster the People	Supermodel		check			
"Cassius Clay's Pearly Whites"	2014	Foster the People	Supermodel	check	check			
"Midnight"	2014	Coldplay	Ghost Stories		check			
"A Sky Full of Stars"	2014	Coldplay	Ghost Stories		check			
"Falling Star"	2014	The Horrors	Luminous	check				
"Always in My Head"	2014	Coldplay	Ghost Stories		check			
"Ink"	2014	Coldplay	Ghost Stories		check			
"True Love"	2014	Coldplay	Ghost Stories		check			
"Another's Arms"	2014	Coldplay	Ghost Stories		check			
"Oceans"	2014	Coldplay	Ghost Stories		check			
"O"	2014	Coldplay	Ghost Stories		check			
"All Your Friends"	2014	Coldplay	Ghost Stories		check			
"Ghost Story"	2014	Coldplay	Ghost Stories		check			
"O (Reprise)"	2014	Coldplay	Ghost Stories		check			
"Black Beauty"	2014	Lana Del Rey	Ultraviolence		check			
"Pendulum"	2014	FKA twigs	LP1	check	check			
"Shoot Love"	2014	Maroon 5	V	check			check	
"The Miracle (of Joey Ramone)"	2014	U2	Songs of Innocence		check			
"California (There is No End to Love)"	2014	U2	Songs of Innocence		check			
"Iris (Hold Me Close)"	2014	U2	Songs of Innocence		check			
"Volcano"	2014	U2	Songs of Innocence				check	
"Cedarwood Road"	2014	U2	Songs of Innocence		check			
"Water Came Down"	2014	Rosie Lowe	non-album single		check			
"Yellow Flicker Beat"	2014	Lorde	The Hunger Games: Mockingjay, Pt. 1 OST		check			
"Do They Know It's Christmas?"	2014	Various artists	Non-album single		check			
"How'd You Like It"	2014	Rosie Lowe	Non-album single		check			
"Citizen Zombie"	2015	The Pop Group	Citizen Zombie		check			
"Mad Truth"	2015	The Pop Group	Citizen Zombie		check			
"Nowhere Girl"	2015	The Pop Group	Citizen Zombie		check			
"Shadow Child"	2015	The Pop Group	Citizen Zombie		check			
"The Immaculate Deception"	2015	The Pop Group	Citizen Zombie		check			
"S.O.P.H.I.A."	2015	The Pop Group	Citizen Zombie		check			
"Box 9"	2015	The Pop Group	Citizen Zombie		check			
"Nations"	2015	The Pop Group	Citizen Zombie		check			
"St. Outrageous"	2015	The Pop Group	Citizen Zombie		check			
"Age of Miracles"	2015	The Pop Group	Citizen Zombie		check			
"Echelon"	2015	The Pop Group	Citizen Zombie		check			
"Mother"	2015	Florence + the Machine	How Big, How Blue, How Beautiful	check	check			
"Unstoppable"	2015	Lianne La Havas	Blood	check	check			
"Chains" (featuring Nas and Bibi Bourelly)	2015	Usher	Non-album single	check	check			
"I Miss You"	2015	Adele	25	check	check			
"Sweetest Devotion"	2015	Adele	25	check	check			
"We Can Hurt Together (Hurt with Me)"	2016	Sia	Non-album single	check	check			
"Goodnight Gotham"	2016	Rihanna	Anti	check				
"Dominos"	2016	Peter Bjorn and John	Breakin' Point		check			
"Beautiful Thing"	2016	The Stone Roses	Non-album single		check			
"All For One"	2016	The Stone Roses	Non-album single		check			
"A Long Goodbye"	2016	Peter Bjorn and John	Breakin' Point		check			
"Nostalgic Intellect"	2016	Peter Bjorn and John	Breakin' Point		check			
"Hard Sleep"	2016	Peter Bjorn and John	Breakin' Point		check			
"Need U" (with Priyanka Chopra)	2016	Usher	Hard II Love	check	check			
"Rooting for You"	2017	London Grammar	Truth Is a Beautiful Thing		check			
"Smoke of Dreams"	2017	Thurston Moore	Rock n Roll Consciousness		check			
"Truth Is a Beautiful Thing"	2017	London Grammar	Truth Is a Beautiful Thing		check			
"Oh Woman Oh Man"	2017	London Grammar	Truth Is a Beautiful Thing		check			
"Exalted"	2017	Thurston Moore	Rock n Roll Consciousness		check			
"Cusp"	2017	Thurston Moore	Rock n Roll Consciousness		check			
"Turn On"	2017	Thurston Moore	Rock n Roll Consciousness		check			
"Aphrodite"	2017	Thurston Moore	Rock n Roll Consciousness		check			
"Cease Fire"	2017	Thurston Moore	Rock n Roll Consciousness		check			
"Mx Liberty"	2017	Thurston Moore	Rock n Roll Consciousness		check			
"Letter to Falon"	2017	Jay Electronica	Act II: Patents of Nobility (The Turn)		check			
"Hell to the Liars"	2017	London Grammar	Truth Is a Beautiful Thing		check			
"Non Believer"	2017	London Grammar	Truth Is a Beautiful Thing	check	check			
"Bones of Ribbon"	2017	London Grammar	Truth Is a Beautiful Thing		check			
"Different Breeds"	2017	London Grammar	Truth Is a Beautiful Thing		check			
"Control"	2017	London Grammar	Truth Is a Beautiful Thing	check	check			
"May the Best"	2017	London Grammar	Truth Is a Beautiful Thing		check			
"Machine"	2017	The Horrors	V		check			
"Something to Remember Me By"	2017	The Horrors	V		check			
"Weighed Down"	2017	The Horrors	V		check			
"Hologram"	2017	The Horrors	V		check			
"Press Enter to Exit"	2017	The Horrors	V		check			
"Ghost"	2017	The Horrors	V		check			
"Point of No Reply"	2017	The Horrors	V		check			
"Gathering"	2017	The Horrors	V		check			
"World Below"	2017	The Horrors	V		check			
"It's a Good Life"	2017	The Horrors	V		check			
"Fire Escape"	2017	The Horrors	V	check				
"Water Drop"	2017	The Horrors	V	check				
"13 (There is a Light)"	2017	U2	Songs of Experience		check			
"Ordinary Love"	2017	U2	Songs of Experience		check			
"Let Me Down" (featuring Stormzy)	2018	Jorja Smith	Non-album single		check			
"Wild Love"	2018	James Bay	Electric Light				check	
"Pink Lemonade"	2018	James Bay	Electric Light				check	
"Us"	2018	James Bay	Electric Light				check	
"Wasted on Each Other"	2018	James Bay	Electric Light				check	
"In My Head"	2018	James Bay	Electric Light				check	
"Just for Tonight"	2018	James Bay	Electric Light				check	
"Wanderlust"	2018	James Bay	Electric Light			check		
"I Found You"	2018	James Bay	Electric Light			check		
"Stand Up"	2018	James Bay	Electric Light	check		check		
"Fade Out"	2018	James Bay	Electric Light				check	
"Slide"	2018	James Bay	Electric Light				check	
"Young Hearts in the Dark"	2018	James Bay	Electric Light				check	
"Invoice"	2018	Serpentwithfeet	Soil	check	check			
"Tearing Down the Walls"	2018	Elias	Entwined	check	check			
"Love Hurts"	2018	Elias	Entwined		check			
"No Deeper Can We Fall"	2018	Elias	Entwined	check	check			
"Don't Let Me Wait"	2018	Elias	Entwined	check	check			
"Gold"	2018	Elias	Entwined	check	check			
"The Entwined"	2018	Elias	Entwined		check			
"Arrested" (featuring Norma Jean Martine)	2018	Love Thy Brother	Non-album single	check				
"Nostalgia"	2018	Jacob Banks	Village	check	check			
"Pressure"	2018	Elle Watson	Clinchers	check	check			
"Bruised"	2018	Elle Watson	Clinchers	check	check			
"Suspended"	2018	Elle Watson	Clinchers		check			
"Glued"	2018	Elle Watson	Clinchers		check			
"Guiding Light"	2018	Mumford & Sons	Delta		check			
"If I Say"	2018	Mumford & Sons	Delta		check			
"42"	2018	Mumford & Sons	Delta		check			
"Woman"	2018	Mumford & Sons	Delta		check			
"Beloved"	2018	Mumford & Sons	Delta		check			
"The Wild"	2018	Mumford & Sons	Delta		check			
"October Skies"	2018	Mumford & Sons	Delta		check			
"Slip Away"	2018	Mumford & Sons	Delta		check			
"Rose of Sharon"	2018	Mumford & Sons	Delta		check			
"Picture You"	2018	Mumford & Sons	Delta		check			
"Darkness Visible"	2018	Mumford & Sons	Delta		check			
"Wild Heart"	2018	Mumford & Sons	Delta		check			
"Forever"	2018	Mumford & Sons	Delta		check			
"Delta"	2018	Mumford & Sons	Delta		check			
"Star"	2019	Beck	Hyperspace	check	check			
"Hawaiian Mazes"	2019	BANKS	III	check	check			
"Don't Forget To Breathe"	2019	Stormzy	Heavy is the Head	check				
"Offline"	2019	Aeris Roves	Non-album single	check	check			
"Round and Round"	2019	Jack Peñate	After You	check	check			
"Murder"	2019	Jack Peñate	After You	check	check			
"GMT"	2019	Jack Peñate	After You	check	check			
"Dreamland"	2020	Glass Animals	Dreamland		check			
"Tangerine"	2020	Glass Animals	Dreamland	check	check			
"Hot Sugar"	2020	Glass Animals	Dreamland		check			
"Space Ghost (Coast To Coast)"	2020	Glass Animals	Dreamland		check			
"Your Love (Déjà Vu)"	2020	Glass Animals	Dreamland		check			
"It's All So Incredibly Loud"	2020	Glass Animals	Dreamland		check			
"Heat Waves"	2020	Glass Animals	Dreamland		check			
"Trouble's Coming"	2020	Royal Blood	Typhoons				check	
"Who Needs Friends"	2021	Royal Blood	Typhoons		check			
"Too Good"	2021	Arlo Parks	Collapsed in Sunbeams	check	check			
"Portra 400"	2021	Arlo Parks	Collapsed in Sunbeams	check			check	
"Mad"	2021	Hope Tala	Non-album single	check	check			
"Extra Clip" (featuring NLE Choppa)	2021	GoldLink	HARAM!	check		check		
"White Walls"	2021	GoldLink	HARAM!	check		check		
"Paradise"	2021	James Vincent McMorrow	Grapefuit Season			check		
"Planes In The Sky"	2021	James Vincent McMorrow	Grapefuit Season	check		check		
"Gone"	2021	James Vincent McMorrow	Grapefuit Season			check		
"Woman"	2021	Lola Young	Non-album single			check		
"Ruin My Make Up"	2021	Lola Young	Non-album single			check		
"FAKE"	2021	Lola Young	Non-album single		check			
"Slidin' (EOB Remix)"	2021	Paul McCartney	Non-album single			check		
"Softly"	2022	Arlo Parks	Non-album single	check	check			
"So Sorry"	2022	Lola Young	Non-album single	check	check			
"This Hell"	2022	Rina Sawayama	Hold The Girl	check	check			
"Frankenstein"	2022	Rina Sawayama	Hold The Girl	check	check			
"Daydreaming"	2022	Harry Stone	Non-album single	check	check			
"Seasons Change"	2022	MorMor	Semblance			check		
"Heaven Ft Damon Albarn"	2022	Bombay Bicycle Club	Bombay Bicycle Club	check	check			
"God Games"	2022	The Kills	God Games	check	check			
"Shades of Love (feat The Joy)"	2022	The Blessed Madonna	Non-album single	check	check			
"Paradise State Of Mind"	2024	Foster The People	Paradise State Of Mind	check	check			
"The Holy Shangri-La"	2024	Foster The People	Paradise State Of Mind	check	check			
"Let Go"	2024	Foster The People	Paradise State Of Mind	check	check			
"Allbarone (Feat. JGrrey)"	2025	Baxter Dury	Allbarone	check	check		check	
"Schadenfreude"	2025	Baxter Dury	Allbarone	check	check		check	
"Kubla Khan"	2025	Baxter Dury	Allbarone	check	check			check
"Alpha Dog"	2025	Baxter Dury	Allbarone	check	check		check	check
"The Other Me"	2025	Baxter Dury	Allbarone	check	check			check
"Hapsburg"	2025	Baxter Dury	Allbarone	check	check		check	
"Return Of The Sharp Heads (Feat. JGrrey)"	2025	Baxter Dury	Allbarone	check	check		check	check
"Mockingjay (Feat. JGrrey)"	2025	Baxter Dury	Allbarone	check	check		check	check
"Mr W4"	2025	Baxter Dury	Allbarone	check	check		check	
"This Could Be Texas - Baxter Dury Remix"	2025	English Teacher, Baxter Dury	This Could Be A Remix Album			check		
"Get Go"	2026	Arlo Parks	Ambiguous Desire	check	check		check	
"Nightswimming"	2026	Arlo Parks	Ambiguous Desire	check	check		check	
"What If Say It"	2026	Arlo Parks	Ambiguous Desire	check	check		check	check
"Incantations"	2026	Ed O'Brien	Blue Morpho	check	check			
"Blue Morpho"	2026	Ed O'Brien	Blue Morpho	check	check			
"Sweet Spot"	2026	Ed O'Brien	Blue Morpho	check	check			
"Teachers"	2026	Ed O'Brien	Blue Morpho	check	check			
"Solfeggio"	2026	Ed O'Brien	Blue Morpho	check	check			
"Thin Places"	2026	Ed O'Brien	Blue Morpho	check	check			
"Obrigado"	2026	Ed O'Brien	Blue Morpho	check	check			
"Alpha Dog (Paul Epworth Extended Version)"	2026	Baxter Dury	Alpha Dog (Paul Epworth Extended Version)	check	check		check	check

=== Remixes ===
- 2004 Bloc Party – "Banquet"
- 2004 Annie – "Heartbeat"
- 2004 Death from Above 1979 – "Romantic Rights"
- 2004 The Futureheads – "Decent Days and Nights"
- 2004 The Streets – "Fit But You Know It"
- 2004 The Futureheads – "Hounds of Love"
- 2005 Gang of Four – "Not Great Men"
- 2005 Goldfrapp – "Ooh La La"
- 2005 The Kills – "Love Is a Deserter"
- 2005 New Order – "Krafty"
- 2005 The Killers – "Smile Like You Mean It"
- 2005 The Others – "This Is for the Poor"
- 2005 The Rakes – "Retreat"
- 2005 Tom Vek – "I Ain't Saying My Goodbyes"
- 2005 Tom Vek – "Nothing But Green Lights"
- 2005 White Rose Movement – "Alsatian"
- 2005 U2 – "City of Blinding Lights"
- 2006 Black Strobe – "Shining Bright Star"
- 2006 Bloc Party – "The Prayer"
- 2006 Muse – "Supermassive Black Hole"
- 2006 Wolf & Cub – "Thousand Cuts"
- 2007 Peter Bjorn and John feat. Victoria Bergsman – "Young Folks"
- 2007 Diddy – "Tell Me"
- 2007 New Young Pony Club – "The Bomb"
- 2007 Nine Inch Nails – "Capital G"
- 2007 Roxy Music – "Editions of You"
- 2007 Interpol – "The Heinrich Maneuver"
- 2007 Dead Soul Bros – "Come On Now"
- 2008 Pin Me Down – "Cryptic"
- 2008 Jape – I Was A Man
- 2008 The Black Ghosts – "Repetition Kills You"
- 2008 Friendly Fires – "Skeleton Boy"
- 2008 Bloc Party – "Talons"
- 2008 Santigold – "Say Aha"
- 2013 U2 - "Ordinary Love"
- 2014 Coldplay - "Midnight"
