= Banquet (song) =

2004 song by Bloc Party

Single by Bloc Party

from the album Silent Alarm
- A-side: "Banquet" (7-inch); Other formats; Boys Noize Vox Remix (10-inch); "Banquet (Phones Disco Edit)" (12-inch)
- B-side: "Staying Fat" (7-inch) Other formats: "Tulips (Peel Session)" (Golden Brown 7-inch); Boys Noize Dub Remix (10-inch); "Compliments (Peel Session)" (CD); "Banquet (The Glimmers Version)" (CD)
- Released: 25 April 2005
- Recorded: 2004
- Studio: Exchange (London)
- Genre: Dance-punk; post-punk revival; alternative rock; post-Britpop
- Length: 3:21
- Label: Wichita
- Songwriters: Russell Lissack, Gordon Moakes, Kele Okereke, Matt Tong
- Producers: Paul Epworth; Bloc Party

Bloc Party singles chronology
"So Here We Are/Positive Tension" (2005)	"Banquet" (2005)	"Pioneers" (2005)

"Banquet" is a song from British band Bloc Party's debut album Silent Alarm. Originally released on a double A-side single along with "Staying Fat" in May 2004 by Moshi Moshi Records, it was re-released as a regular single in the United Kingdom by Wichita Recordings on 25 April 2005. It was their first single to chart on the Billboard Modern Rock Tracks, reaching number 34, and is often credited as their breakthrough single in North America. It was also featured in the song "Bloc Party" on the Fort Minor Mixtape: We Major.

"Banquet" was ranked No. 31 in NME's top 100 tracks of the decade, and was number 54 in Triple J's Hottest 100 of all time. It peaked at No. 13 on the UK Singles Chart. In 2011, NME placed it at number 20 on its list "150 Best Tracks of the Past 15 Years".

== Background and music ==
The song was originally written by lead singer Kele Okereke while on tour in 2003. He was inspired by Pixies' record Doolittle at the time, specifically the song called "I Bleed", which was later used for the phrasing of "Banquet". Apart from Pixies, Okereke was also inspired by the song "Prince Charming" by Adam and the Ants.

The song is in the key of A♯ minor and in 4/4 time signature. One of the most notable parts of the song is the guitar interplay between Okereke and Lissack, which continues through much of the song.

The song is about teenage life and contains lines and phrases related to sex.

== Music videos ==
There were two videos for "Banquet". A non-released version contains a recurring theme of hands, some of which push band members Russell Lissack and Gordon Moakes around while other hands cover up drummer Matt Tong's head and cast a shadow over frontman Kele Okereke. The hands eventually try to stab all of Bloc Party, set fire to the set and destroy the instruments and amps. Meanwhile, the released version shows the group performing in front of many different people. It is shown in full color and in black and white. The music video has gained around 48 million views on YouTube, becoming the band's most popular video.

== Remixes ==
The song has been remixed 10 times. Its remix by Phones (Paul Epworth) was released as a promotional single for their remix album Silent Alarm Remixed and their EP Bloc Party EP. The songs remix by The Streets had a music video made and was released as one of the b-sides for their single "Two More Years". Its two remixes by Boys Noize were released as a 10" single.

This is a list of all remixes of the song:

- "Banquet (Phones Disco Edit)"
- "Banquet (The Streets Mix)"
- "Banquet (Another Version By The Glimmers)"
- "Banquet (Boys Noize Vox Mix)"
- "Banquet (Boys Noize Dub)"
- "Bloc Party" (Remix of Banquet by Mike Shinoda, Apathy & Tak of S.O.B.)
- "Banquet (Cornelius Remix)"
- "Banquet (Black Moustache Remix)"
- "Banquet (Fake ID's Feast Mix)"
- "Banquet (Junior Sanchez JR Mix)"

== Banquet (Phones Disco Edit) ==
"Banquet (Phones Disco Edit)"

Single by Bloc Party

from the album Silent Alarm Remixed & Bloc Party EP
- B-side: "Banquet"
- Released: October 2004
- Recorded: 2004
- Genre: Dance-punk, alternative dance, electronic
- Length: 5:25
- Label: Wichita
- Songwriters: Russell Lissack, Gordon Moakes, Kele Okereke, Matt Tong
- Producer: Paul Epworth

"Banquet (Phones Disco Edit)" was a promotional single by Bloc Party from their first EP "Bloc Party EP", and their remix album "Silent Alarm Remixed". It was originally released as a one sided white label vinyl to promote the "Bloc Party EP", which was limited to 250 copies, but was re-released to promote "Silent Alarm Remixed" with the original version of "Banquet" on side B. This version is still available on the Wichita Recordings website. The remix appeared in the video game Midnight Club 3: DUB Edition Remix.

=== Track listings ===
Original 12-inch vinyl

1. "Banquet (Phones Disco Edit)" - 5:25

Re-release 12-inch vinyl

1. "Banquet (Phones Disco Edit)" - 5:25
2. "Banquet" - 3:21

Digital download

1. "Banquet (Phones Disco Edit)" - 5:25

== Track listings ==
CD: Wichita / WEBB078SCD (UK)

1. "Banquet"
2. "Compliments" (Peel Session) [produced by Miti Adhikari]
3. "Banquet" (Another Version by The Glimmers)

CD: Wichita / VVR5032983 (European release)

1. "Banquet"
2. "Banquet" (Another Version by The Glimmers)
3. "Banquet" (EP Version)
4. "Banquet" (Phones Disco Edit)
5. "Banquet" (Cornelius Remix)
6. "Banquet" (video)

DVD: Wichita / WEBB078DVD (UK)

1. "Banquet"
2. "So Here We Are" (Peel Session)
3. "Banquet" (Video)
4. "Little Thoughts" (Video)

7-inch: Wichita / WEBB078S (UK)

1. "Banquet"
2. "Tulips" (Peel Session)

== Charts ==
Chart (2005)	Peak position
Scottish Singles Sales (Official Charts)	15
UK Singles (Official Charts)	13
US Alternative Airplay (Billboard)	34

== Certifications ==
Region	Certification	Certified units/sales
New Zealand (RMNZ)	Platinum	30,000^{‡}
United Kingdom (BPI)	Platinum	600,000^{‡}
^{‡} Sales+streaming figures based on certification alone.
