= Bloc Party (EP) =

EP by Bloc Party
- Released: 24 May 2004
- Recorded: 2003
- Genre: Post-punk revival
- Length: 22:34
- Label: V2
- Producers: Bloc Party; Paul Epworth; Mark Aubrey; Scott McCormick

Bloc Party chronology
Bloc Party (2004)	Little Thoughts (2004)

Singles from Bloc Party
- 1. "She's Hearing Voices" Released: 16 February 2004; 2. "Banquet/Staying Fat" Released: 3 May 2004

Professional ratings
Review scores
Source	Rating
Allmusic	3.5/5 stars

Bloc Party is an EP compilation of Bloc Party's first two UK-only singles: "She's Hearing Voices" and "Banquet/Staying Fat". Released on 24 May 2004, it was Bloc Party's first V2 Records EP. It was released later in Japan in August 2004, and then in the United States by Dim Mak Records in September of the same year. The EP was lauded in Pitchfork for carefully balancing the dynamics between post-punk revival and new wave. In 2015 NME cited the EP's tracks "Banquet" and "She's Hearing Voices" as having made a splash in 2004 leading up the 2005 debut of their album Silent Alarm. The single "Banquet", is cited by DIY Magazine as being influential on Wichita Records, then a nascent label, signing Bloc Party and notes the record impacts musicians in the genre today.

== Track listing ==
All songs written by Bloc Party except "The Answer", written by Bloc Party and Liz Neumayr.

No.	Title	Producer(s)	Length
1.	"Banquet"	Paul Epworth	3:19
2.	"Staying Fat"	Mark Aubrey; Scott McCormick; Bloc Party	2:23
3.	"She's Hearing Voices"	Bloc Party	3:30
4.	"The Marshals Are Dead"	Bloc Party	3:52
5.	"The Answer"	Bloc Party	4:04
6.	"Banquet (Phones Disco Edit)"	Paul Epworth	5:26

== Personnel ==
- Mark Aubrey – Producer
- Bloc Party – Producer
- Paul Epworth – Producer
- Scott McCormick – Producer
- Linsey Tulley – Illustrations
- Simon White – Management
- Tony Perrin – Management
