= Tulips (song) =

Single by Bloc Party

from the album Little Thoughts
- Released: 25 January 2005
- Recorded: 2004
- Genre: Indie rock
- Label: Dim Mak
- Songwriters: Russell Lissack, Gordon Moakes, Kele Okereke, Matt Tong

Bloc Party singles chronology
"Helicopter" (2004)	"Tulips" (2005)	"So Here We Are/Positive Tension" (2005)

"Tulips" is a single by British band Bloc Party. The song was released as a single in the United States on CD and 7" vinyl.

The video included with the song features a few clips of Bloc Party live shows.

== In other media ==
"Tulips" was featured in "Mars vs. Mars", an episode of the television series Veronica Mars.

== Track listing ==
CD single DM076

1. "Tulips"
2. "Tulips" (Minotaur Shock Mix)

7" vinyl DM076

1. "Tulips"
2. "Tulips" (Minotaur Shock Mix)

== Charts ==
Chart (2005)	Peak position
UK Singles Chart	117

Chart (2022)	Peak position
UK Physical Singles Chart	83
