= So Here We Are / Positive Tension =

2005 single by Bloc Party

"So Here We Are" / "Positive Tension"

Single by Bloc Party

from the album Silent Alarm
- B-side: "The Marshals Are Dead"; "Helicopter"
- Released: 31 January 2005
- Length: 3:52
- Label: Wichita (UK); V2 (Europe)
- Songwriters: Kele Okereke; Russell Lissack; Gordon Moakes; Matt Tong
- Producers: Paul Epworth; Bloc Party

Bloc Party singles chronology
"Tulips" (2004)	"So Here We Are" / "Positive Tension" (2005)	"Banquet" (2005)

Music video
- "So Here We Are" on YouTube

"So Here We Are" and "Positive Tension" are two songs by English rock band Bloc Party from their 2005 debut album, Silent Alarm. The songs were released as a double A-side single in the United Kingdom and peaked at number five on the UK Singles Chart, becoming their highest-charting single at the time. The song also reached number 31 in Ireland. The UK 7-inch vinyl release contains "The Marshals Are Dead" instead of "Positive Tension".

== Music video ==
There are two music videos for So Here We Are. The original was released in 2005 and features the band members in various autumn and urban scenes, often seen lying on the ground. As of 2026, the video has over 6 million views, making it one of the band's most popular videos.

The second music video was released in 2023 and was created in collaboration with British telecom brand EE Limited. It is taken from one of the brand's commercials.

== Track listings ==
UK CD single: "So Here We Are" / "Positive Tension"

1. "So Here We Are"
2. "Positive Tension"
3. "Helicopter" (Sheriff Whitey Mix)

UK 7-inch single: "So Here We Are" / "The Marshals Are Dead"

1. "So Here We Are"
2. "The Marshals Are Dead"

UK DVD single: "So Here We Are"

1. "So Here We Are" (audio)
2. "The Marshals Are Dead" (audio)
3. "So Here We Are" (video)
4. "Tulips" (video)

European maxi-CD single: "So Here We Are" / "Positive Tension"

1. "So Here We Are"
2. "Positive Tension"
3. "The Marshals Are Dead"
4. "So Here We Are" (Four Tet Remix)
5. "Always New Depths"

== Charts ==
Chart (2005)	Peak position
Europe (Eurochart Hot 100)	20
Ireland (IRMA)	31
Scottish Singles Sales (Official Charts)	5
UK Singles (Official Charts)	5
UK Indie (Official Charts)	1
