= Minotaur Shock =

English electronic musician

- Born: David John Edwards
- Origin: Bristol, England
- Genres: Electronic, IDM
- Labels: Melodic, 4AD
- Website: Minotaurshock.com, principalparticipant.bandcamp.com

Minotaur Shock is the stage name of David John Edwards, a Bristol-based electronic musician. His 2005 album Maritime was his first album released through 4AD Records, having previously released work via the Manchester-based Melodic label. Edwards returned to Melodic for the release of his 2012 album, Orchard.

He also plays drums in Bronze Age Fox, a band from the Hanham area of Bristol. Since 2010, he has also released music under the stage name Principal Participant.

== Discography ==
=== Albums ===
- Chiff-Chaffs and Willow Warblers (2001)
- Rinse (2003)
- Maritime (2005)
- Amateur Dramatics (2008)
- Orchard (2012)
- Music from 'The Noise' (2014)
- MINO (2019)
- Salina Pulse Streams (2020)
- Chaff Probes (2021)
- It All Levels Out (2024)

==== Albums as Principal Participant ====
- Principles (2010)
- Particles (2013)

=== Singles and EPs ===
- The Bagatelle (2001)
- Motoring Britain (2001)
- Rockpoolin (2003)
- Vigo Bay (2005)
- Muesli (2005)
- Qi (2021)
- Deliberations (2026)

=== Compilations ===
- Rinse (2002)

=== Remixes ===
- 2000 2 Amigos - "The Great Freight Escape"
- 2001 His Name Is Alive - "One Year"
- 2002 Badly Drawn Boy - "Pissing in the Wind", "The Shining"
- 2002 Normal Position - "Big Tits"
- 2003 Hint - "Count Your Blessings"
- 2003 Lucky Pierre - "The Heart of All That Is"
- 2003 Mojave 3 - "Bluebird of Happiness"
- 2004 Bloc Party - "Tulips"
- 2004 Lunz - "Uferlose Sea"
- 2004 Super Furry Animals - "Cityscape Skybaby"
- 2005 Diefenbach - "Glorious"
- 2005 The Longcut - "Transition"
- 2005 Wolf & Cub - "Targets"
- 2006 Hard-Fi - "Hard to Beat"
- 2007 Stars - "The Big Fight"
- 2009 Deastro - "Toxic Crusaders"
