= Matt Tong =

English drummer (born 1979)

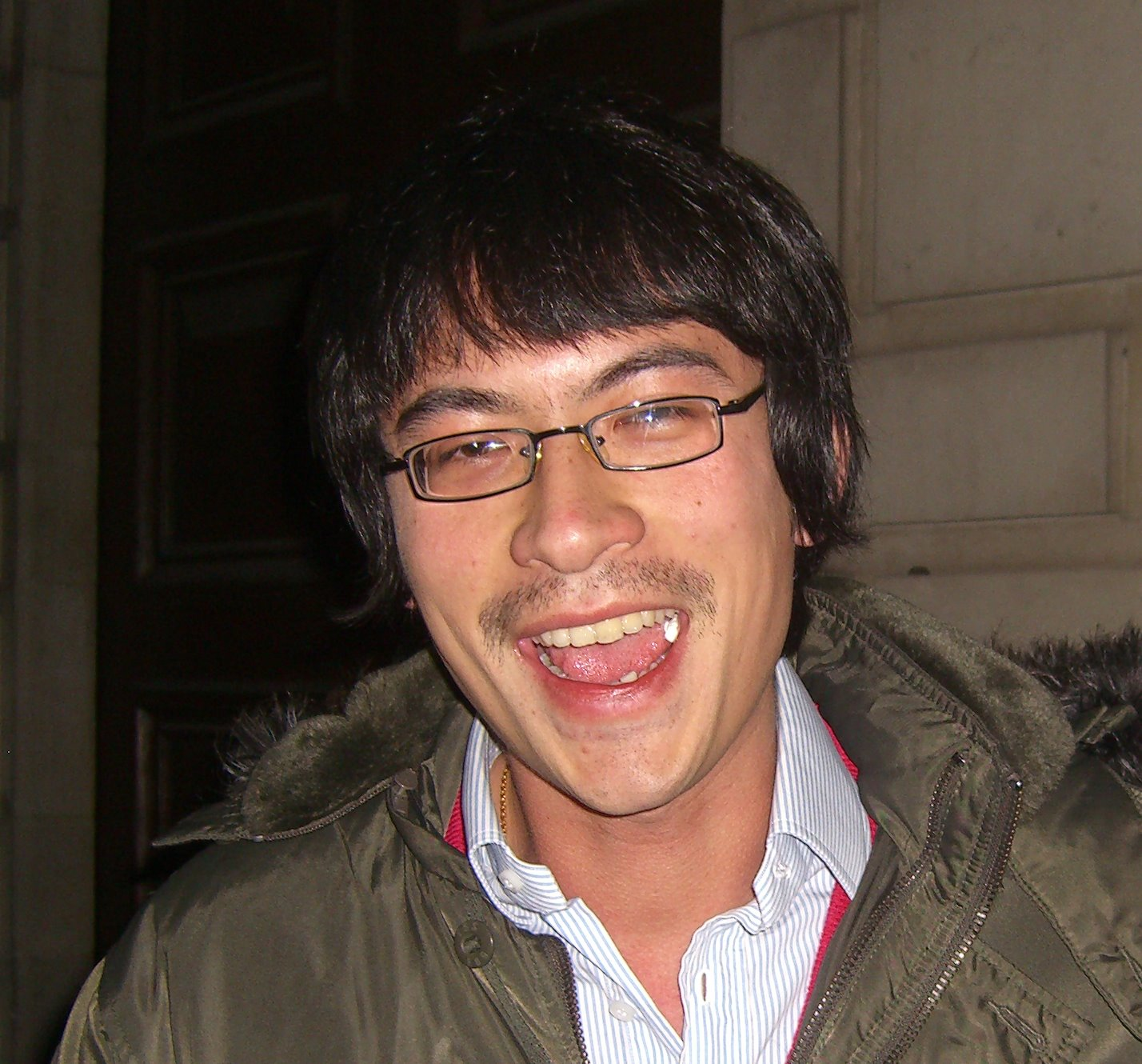
- Tong in 2007

Background information
- Born: Matthew Chee Hung Tong; 29 April 1979 (age 47); Bournemouth, Dorset, England
- Genres: Post-punk revival; indie rock; dance-punk; alternative rock; art punk; experimental rock; industrial
- Occupation: Musician
- Instruments: Drums; percussion
- Years active: 2002–present
- Member of: Algiers
- Formerly of: Bloc Party

Matthew Chee Hung Tong (born 29 April 1979) is a British musician from Bournemouth, England. He is best known as the drummer of Bloc Party from 2002 to 2013 and has been a member of Algiers since 2015.

== Early life ==
Tong was born in Bournemouth, England to a British mother and a Malaysian-Chinese father. He is a supporter of AFC Bournemouth. He began learning piano at the age of 6, citing the theatrics of Little Richard as an early influence, though he now considers guitar his most important instrument.

== Career ==
Tong joined Bloc Party in 2002, the ninth drummer to perform with the band. He later recorded the band's demo version of "She's Hearing Voices" which was played by BBC Radio 1 DJ Steve Lamacq on his show. On 9 November 2006, Tong suffered a collapsed lung after opening for Panic! at the Disco in Atlanta and was admitted to the hospital, causing Bloc Party to miss the next few shows on the tour. Tong said in 2009, "I wouldn't mind trying something else for a while" regarding the uncertainty of Bloc Party's future.

Tong left Bloc Party during the band's summer 2013 tour, after recording four albums with the band. Bloc Party frontman Kele Okereke alluded to simmering tensions that had been boiling up behind the scenes that were never verbalised, as well as disagreements over cocaine usage by someone close to the band. In 2022, Okereke said "I don’t really want either of them in my life right now" of Tong and bassist Gordon Moakes, who also left Bloc Party in 2015 after 13 years. In a 2024 interview, Tong called Okereke "an insurmountable obstacle", said the two have not spoken since his departure, and confirmed that he left Bloc Party via an email because Okereke wanted a member of the band's touring party removed over drug usage during a birthday celebration.

Tong played the drums on No Devotion's 2015 debut album Permanence, stepping in to finish the final four songs after Luke Johnson left the band in the middle of recording. Tong also drummed in a new band L'Amour Bleu under the alias "She-Tong". He also formed the band Red Love with producer Alex Newport, whose debut album came out in 2017.

In 2015, Tong joined the band Algiers, first as a touring member before being brought on as the band's permanent drummer.

In 2022, Tong played on the song "Frankenstein" from Rina Sawayama's second album Hold the Girl. Sawayama asked producer/songwriter Paul Epworth, who had produced the Bloc Party albums Silent Alarm and Intimacy, to recruit Tong for the song. Sawayama said that Tong was an inspiration to her as a fellow Asian in the music industry. Tong's hands were covered in fresh hot blood following the recording.

In 2025, Tong, along with the other three original members of Bloc Party, received an Ivor Novello award in the Outstanding Song Collection category.

=== Drumming style ===
Tong described himself as "notoriously sloppy at timekeeping". He wrote the drum parts on Silent Alarm as alternating between high and low intensity to give himself a physical break, for he became tired easily after smoking a pack of cigarettes per day. Tong said that he was not an athletic person and always struggled at sports, so drumming became too fast for his own comfort. During live performances, he becomes a "mood drummer" who changes the speed of his performance based on crowd reaction.

NME's Nick Reilly said that Silent Alarm was revered because "Okereke’s vocals are perfectly anchored by Tong’s ferocious drumming" and said that Bloc Party's 2018 shows playing the album in full would be "worthless" without the original lineup.

== Personal life ==
Tong has lived in New York City since 2010.

Tong married Brooke Vermillion, the touring DJ of Kindness, in 2006.
