= Hunting for Witches =

Single by Bloc Party

from the album A Weekend in the City
- B-side: "Rhododendrons"; "Secrets"; "Cavaliers and Roundheads"; Remixes
- Released: 9 July 2007
- Recorded: 2006
- Genre: Indie rock; post-punk revival
- Length: 3:31
- Label: Wichita
- Songwriters: Russell Lissack, Gordon Moakes, Kele Okereke, Matt Tong
- Producer: Jacknife Lee

Bloc Party singles chronology
| "I Still Remember" (2007) | "Hunting for Witches" (2007) | "Flux" (2007) |

"Hunting for Witches" is a song by English rock band Bloc Party. It was released as the third single from their second studio album, A Weekend in the City, on 9 July 2007. The song peaked at number 22 on the UK Singles Chart.

== Composition ==
"Hunting for Witches" lyrics were influenced by the terrorist attacks on London's transportation system in July 2005, the September 11, 2001 attacks in the United States, and the media's reaction to the attacks. It also touches upon the amount of control the media has over modern society. Frontman Kele Okereke stated in an interview:

The 30 bus in Hackney, which is just around the corner from where I live, was blown up. [That song was] written when I was just observing the reactions of the mainstream press in [the UK] and I was just amazed at how easy it'd been to whip them up into a fury. ... I guess the point about the song for me is post-September 11th, the media has really traded on fear and the use of fear in controlling people.

== Music video ==
The music video for the song was the most minimalist one from the album. It simply features the band performing the song in a dark room, using some unique overhead shots in some parts of the video. The video is credited as being directed by Alan Smithee. As of 2026, a version of the video uploaded on YouTube has around 7 million views, making it one of the band's more popular videos.

== Track listing ==
=== 7" vinyls ===
- Wichita / WEBB130S (UK) (In gatefold sleeve which houses second 7")

All tracks are written by Bloc Party.

| No. | Title | Producer(s) | Length |
|---|---|---|---|
| 1. | "Hunting for Witches" | Jacknife Lee | 3:31 |
| 2. | "Rhododendrons" | Eliot James | 4:49 |

- Wichita / WEBB130SX (UK)

All tracks are written by Bloc Party.

| No. | Title | Producer(s) | Length |
|---|---|---|---|
| 1. | "Hunting for Witches (Live at Bristol Academy 02/07/07)" | | 3:34 |
| 2. | "Secrets" | Eliot James | 4:06 |

=== CDs ===
- Wichita / WEBB130SCD (UK)

All tracks are written by Bloc Party.

| No. | Title | Producer(s) | Length |
|---|---|---|---|
| 1. | "Hunting for Witches" | Jacknife Lee | 3:31 |
| 2. | "Cavaliers and Roundheads" | Bloc Party; Justin Underhill | 3:44 |
| 3. | "Uniform (James Rutledge Remix)" | Jacknife Lee; James Rutledge | 8:23 |

- Wichita / WEBB130SRMX (UK)

All tracks are written by Bloc Party.

| No. | Title | Length |
|---|---|---|
| 1. | "Hunting for Witches (Fury666 Remix)" | 3:42 |
| 2. | "Hunting for Witches (Crystal Castles Remix)" | 4:57 |

- Manufactured CD, but labelled "for promotional use only".

=== Download ===
All tracks are written by Bloc Party.

| No. | Title | Length |
|---|---|---|
| 1. | "Hunting for Witches (Dave Pianka Remix)" | 6:29 |

== Charts ==
| Chart (2008) | Peak position |
|---|---|
| UK Singles Chart | 22 |
