= Flux (Bloc Party song) =

Single by Bloc Party

from the album A Weekend in the City (re-release)
- B-side: "The Once and Future King" (7")
- Released: 12 November 2007
- Recorded: 2007 at The Garage
- Genre: Alternative dance; synthrock
- Length: 3:39
- Label: Wichita
- Songwriters: Russell Lissack, Gordon Moakes, Kele Okereke, Matt Tong
- Producer: Jacknife Lee

Bloc Party singles chronology
"Hunting for Witches" (2007)	"Flux" (2007)	"Mercury" (2008)

"Flux" is a song by English rock band Bloc Party. It was released as a single on 12 November 2007 and produced by Jacknife Lee, along with several other new songs, during the band's week in the studio after their performances at the Carling Weekend: Reading and Leeds Festivals. The song uses mostly electronic instruments and features vocalist Kele Okereke's voice manipulated through Auto-Tune. It was first performed live on 26 September 2007 at Covington's Madison Theater.

CD1 of the set was only released as a free CD through the 14 November 2007 issue of NME. The song peaked at number 8 in the UK Singles Chart as the band's fourth UK Top 10 single. "Flux" is featured on the re-released version of Bloc Party's second studio album A Weekend in the City and on the North American version of their third album Intimacy.

For Japan, the song was released as part of a 13-track remix album, also titled "Flux".

== Music video ==
A music video for the song was directed by director Ace Norton, who has previously directed videos for The Willows, Norah Jones and Death Cab for Cutie. The video was published on NME's website on 17 October 2007. Like the Beastie Boys' music video for "Intergalactic", it pays homage to Japanese kaiju movies. It shows two giant silver robots falling in love while other monsters and robots destroy the city they are in. The band themselves do not appear in the video.

The video was filmed over two days in Boston with American performance troupe Kaiju Big Battel. Some of the Kaiju (Japanese for 'strange beast') characters in the video are the Call-Me-Kevin, Grudyin, Unibouzo, Vegetius, Giii the Space Pirate and Steam-Powered Tentacle Boulder. One of the characters has striking similarities to a Cylon.

As of 2026, the music video has more than 12 million views, making it one of the band's most popular videos.

== Track listing ==
All lyrics by Kele Okereke, all music composed by Bloc Party (Kele Okereke, Russell Lissack, Gordon Moakes and Matt Tong).

=== Digital download ===
- UK single
1. "Flux"
2. "On" (Principle Participant "Legs" Mix)

=== 7" ===
Wichita / WEBB135S (UK) (clear vinyl)
No.	Title	Producer(s)	Length
1.	"Flux"	Jacknife Lee	3:38
2.	"The Once and Future King"	Eliot James	3:22

=== CD1 ===
Wichita / NMECD07-05 (UK) Given away free with the 14 November 2007 issue of the NME
No.	Title	Length
1.	"Flux (JFK Remix)"	4:36
2.	"Flux (Punx Soundcheck "Tenebrae" Remix)"	5:02
3.	"Flux (Metal on Metal Remake)"	5:03
4.	"Flux (GoodBooks Magnetism Remix)"	5:06

=== CD2 ===
Wichita / WEBB135SCD (UK)
No.	Title	Producer(s)	Length
1.	"Flux"	Jacknife Lee	3:38
2.	"Flux" (Live from the WaMu Theater at Madison Square Garden, 3 October 2007)		4:08
3.	"Emma Kate's Accident"	Eliot James	5:45

=== 12" ===
- Wichita / WEBB135T (United Kingdom) (clear vinyl)
1. "Flux" (Extended Version) – 6:32
2. "Flux" (Extended Instrumental) – 6:27
3. "Where Is Home?" (Burial Remix) – 5:28

=== Japan Remix Album ===
Hostess Entertainment Unlimited (HSE-70008) / Wichita (WEBB135JPN)
No.	Title	Length
1.	"Flux (Extended 12" Mix)"	6:31
2.	"The Prayer (Phones Metal Jackin' Mix)"	5:03
3.	"Hunting For Witches (Fury666 Remix)"	3:40
4.	"Flux (JFK Remix)"	4:35
5.	"I Still Remember (Sebastian Mix)"	4:30
6.	"Uniform (James Rutledge Remix)"	8:24
7.	"Where Is Home? (Burial Remix)"	5:33
8.	"Flux (Metal on Metal Remake)"	5:02
9.	"On (Principle Participant "Legs" Mix)"	7:50
10.	"The Prayer (Does It Offend You, Yeah? Remix)"	4:20
11.	"Flux (GoodBooks Magnetism Remix)"	5:07
12.	"I Still Remember (Music Box And Tears Mix)"	5:05
13.	"Flux"	3:38

== Personnel ==
- Jacknife Lee – production, mixing, programming, keys ("Flux")
- Sam Bell – recording, additional programming ("Flux")
- Eliot James – production, engineering, mixing ("The Once and Future King" and "Emma Kate's Accident")
- Nilesh Patel at The Exchange, London – mastering ("Flux", "The Once and Future King" and "Emma Kate's Accident")
- Dave Cooley – mixing, mastering (live version)
- Gus Oberg – recording (live version)
- Patrick Billiard – recording assistant (live version)
- Tony Perrin – management
- Simon White – management
- Rut Blees Luxembourg – photograph
- Work – graphic design
- EMI Music – publishing
- V2 Music – marketing and distribution

== Charts ==
=== Weekly charts ===
Chart (2007–2008)	Peak position
Belgium (Ultratop 50 Flanders)	27
Belgium (Ultratip Bubbling Under Wallonia)	7
Germany (Official German Charts)	84
Ireland (IRMA)	41
UK Singles (Official Charts)	8

=== Year-end charts ===
Chart (2007)	Position
UK Singles Chart	135
Chart (2008)	Position
UK Singles Chart	182

== Certifications ==
Region	Certification	Certified units/sales
United Kingdom (BPI)	Gold	400,000^{‡}
^{‡} Sales+streaming figures based on certification alone.
