= Trick (Kele Okereke album) =

Studio album by Kele
- Released: 13 October 2014
- Recorded: 2012–14 in London and New York
- Genre: Alternative dance; deep house; breakbeat; 2 step; UK garage
- Length: 40:58
- Label: Lilac Records
- Producer: Kele; XXXChange; Tom Belton

Kele chronology
The Hunter (2011)	Trick (2014)	Fatherland (2017)

Singles from Trick
- 1. "Doubt" Released: 19 August 2014; 2. "Coasting" Released: 22 September 2014; 3. "Closer" Released: 8 December 2014

Trick is the second solo album by Kele Okereke, the lead singer of British indie rock band Bloc Party. It was released on 13 October 2014 through Lilac Records. It entered the UK Albums Chart at number 99.

Professional ratings
Aggregate scores
Source	Rating
Metacritic	67/100
Review scores
Source	Rating
Clash	7/10
The Guardian	3/5 stars
Pitchfork	6/10
NME	7/10
Consequence of Sound	C+
Los Angeles Times	2.5/4 stars
DIY	3/5 stars
MusicOMH	4/5 stars

== Track listing ==
No.	Title	Writer(s)	Length
1.	"First Impressions"	Kele Okereke; Yasmin Shahmir; Colin Bailey	3:56
2.	"Coasting"	Okereke	4:35
3.	"Doubt"	Okereke	4:50
4.	"Closer"	Okereke	3:26
5.	"Like We Used To"	Okereke	4:41
6.	"Humour Me"	Okereke	3:54
7.	"Year Zero"	Okereke	3:45
8.	"My Hotel Room"	Okereke	4:18
9.	"Silver and Gold"	Okereke	3:18
10.	"Stay the Night"	Okereke	4:15

Notes

- "First Impressions" features vocals by Yasmin.
- "Closer" features vocals by Jodie Scantlebury.

== Chart performance ==
Chart (2014)	Peak position
UK Albums (Official Charts Company)	99
UK Dance Albums (Official Charts Company)	9
