= XXXChange =

American record producer, mixer and film composer

Alex Brady Epton, known professionally as XXXChange, is an American, New York–based record producer, mixer and film composer. In 2014, he joined XL Recordings in New York, and as their in-house producer/engineer worked with FKA Twigs, Wiki, Ratking, Amber Mark, Jamie xx, Willis Earl Beal, Vampire Weekend and Skepta.

In addition to his work as a record producer, Epton has scored several television commercials and short films including GANG directed by Clayton Vomero, and Juvenile directed by Jovan Todorovic.

He produced the 2006 debut album YoYoYoYoYo of the musical group Spank Rock. He was also involved with the self-titled debut album of the group WIN WIN alongside Chris Devlin and Ghostdad, released in 2011 on Vice Records.

Epton has also done production or remix work for The Kills, Kele Okereke, Björk, Charlotte Gainsbourg, Thom Yorke, TV on the Radio, Lily Allen, Kool Keith, and Kylie Minogue.

As a DJ, Epton performed at the V Festival in the UK and Parklife Festival in Australia 2008, Sonar Festival in Spain and the Guggenheim in NYC 2009, Electric Zoo Festival in NYC & Ninja Tune XX in London 2010.

== Discography ==
=== 2006 ===
- Spank Rock – YoYoYoYoYo
  - "Backyard Betty"
  - "What It Look Like"
  - "IMC"
  - "Rick Rubin"
  - "Touch Me"
  - "Bump"
  - "Sweet Talk"
  - "Chilly Will"
  - "Top Billin' from Far Left"
  - "Coke & Wet"
  - "Competition"
  - "Outro (Screwville USA)"

=== 2008 ===
- The Kills – Midnight Boom
  - "Cheap and Cheerful"
  - "Black Balloon"
  - "M.E.X.I.C.O."
  - "What New York Used to Be"

=== 2009 ===
- Amanda Blank – I Love You
  - "Make It Take It"
  - "Make-Up"
  - "Shame on Me"
  - "Might Like You Better"
- Kid Sister – Ultraviolet
  - "Let Me Bang 2009"
  - "54321"
  - "Get Fresh"
  - "Control"

=== 2010 ===
- Kele – The Boxer
  - "Walk Tall"
  - "On the Lam"
  - "Tenderoni"
  - "The Other Side"
  - "Everything You Wanted"
  - "The New Rules"
  - "Unholy Thoughts"
  - "Rise"
  - "All the Things I Could Never Say"
  - "Yesterday's Gone"
  - "Meet in the Middle" (digital bonus track)

=== 2011 ===
- Kele – The Hunter
  - "What Did I Do?" (featuring Lucy Taylor)
  - "Devotion"
  - "Love as a Weapon"
  - "You Belong to Someone Else"
- WIN WIN – WIN WIN
  - "Victim" (featuring Blaqstarr)
  - "Future Again (Oakland) (featuring Angela Sarakan)
  - "Releaserpm" (featuring Lizzi Bougatsos)
  - "Interleave"(featuring Alexis Taylor)
  - "Cada Buen Dia"
  - "Pop A Gumball" (featuring Andrew W.K., Matt Sweeney, and Naeem Hanks)
  - "Distorted Reality 3"
  - "Ghosts/Delirium"
  - "The Nature of Transcendent Forces" (featuring Douglas Armour)
  - "Not Too Late"
  - "Not Too Late (Pt. 2)" (featuring Mika Yoneta)
- GANG GANG DANCE – Eye Contact
- Michel Poicard – The Death Set

=== 2012 ===
- WIN WIN – Double Vision
- Peaches – Burst!

=== 2013 ===
- Willis Earl Beal – Nobody Knows.

=== 2014 ===
- Ratking – So it Goes

=== 2015 ===
- Kali Uchis – Por Vida
  - ”Melting”
  - ”Lottery”
- Larry Gus – I Need New Eyes
- Neon Indian – Vega Intl. Night School
- WIN WIN – Primaries

=== 2016 ===
- Prince Rama – Xtreme Now

=== 2017 ===
- MIKE – May God Bless Your Hustle
- Wiki – No Mountains in Manhattan

=== 2018 ===
- David Byrne – American Utopia
- HAWA – Might Be

=== 2019 ===
- FKA Twigs – Magdalene
- Wiki – Oofie
- Jack Penate – Prayer
- Holy Ghost! – Work
- MIKE – Tears of Joy

== Official remixes ==
=== 2006 ===
- Kool Keith/Dr. Octagon – "Trees (SpankRock remix)"

=== 2008 ===
- Kenna - Out of Control (XXXChange Remix) (Exclusively featured in Facebreaker and MLB 08 The Show)
- Björk – "Earth Intruders (xxxchange remix)"
- Beck – "Nausea (XXXchange remix)"
- Panda Bear – "Comfy in Nautica (XXXChange remix)"
- Santogold – "L.E.S. Artistes (XXXChange mix)"
- Gang Gang Dance – "House Jam (XXXChange remix)"

=== 2009 ===
- El Guincho – "Antillas (XXXChangxxe remix)"

=== 2010 ===
- Kylie Minogue – "All the Lovers (XXXChangeRemix)"
- Yeasayer – "O.N.E. (XXXChange Remix)"
- Thom Yorke – "The Eraser (XXXchange Remix)"
- Charlotte Gainsbourg – "Time of the Assassins (XXXChange Remix)"

=== 2011 ===
- TV on the Radio – "Will Do (XXXChange Remix)"

=== 2013 ===
- Vampire Weekend - "Step (XXXChange Remix)"
