= I Still Remember =

Single by Bloc Party

from the album A Weekend in the City
- B-side: "Atonement"; "Cain Said to Abel"; "Selfish Son"; Remixes
- Released: 9 April 2007
- Recorded: 2006
- Genre: Indie rock; alternative rock
- Length: 4:24
- Label: Wichita
- Songwriters: Russell Lissack, Gordon Moakes, Kele Okereke, Matt Tong
- Producer: Jacknife Lee

Bloc Party singles chronology
| "The Prayer" (2007) | "I Still Remember" (2007) | "Hunting for Witches" (2007) |

"I Still Remember" is a song by English rock band Bloc Party, from their second studio album A Weekend in the City. It was released on 9 April 2007 as the album's lead single in the US and its second single in the UK.

The song peaked at number 24 on the Billboard Modern Rock Tracks chart, making it Bloc Party's highest-charting single in the US. It peaked at number 20 in the UK.

== Background ==
The single was released in Britain in two 7" formats as well as a CD version. The B-sides are "Atonement", "Cain Said To Abel", "Selfish Son", and "I Still Remember (Music Box And Tears Remix)". A limited edition "I Still Remember" 7" was also given to the first 1000 people who pre-ordered the album from Insound. The music video was made by Aggressive and was first shown on 8 January 2007 on MTV2.

== Song inspiration ==
Frontman Kele Okereke talked about the song at some length in his January 2007 The Observer interview, responding to questions as to whether the song had an autobiographical nature:

Not really ... I guess, partially. [Can we call it a gay love story?] Yeah, but is it a love story? It's one person longing for somebody they can't really have. But it's not consummated. It's not a mutual thing. ...

This is probably a contentious issue, but I swear that I could always see [male homosexual attraction] in people, in the way that guys would need to be touching other guys. You could see there was something they couldn't say aloud. And I saw it when I was at school. And I guess "I Still Remember" is an attempt at trying to confront that. ... I know from my own experiences a lot of heterosexual boys had feelings or experiences when they were younger. And that's not really ever spoken about, that un-spoken desire. ...

Not two gay boys ... but the idea of two straight boys having an attraction, or there being an attraction that's unspeakable – that was the idea of that song.

== Track listing ==
=== 7" singles ===
- Wichita / WEBB125S (UK) (in gatefold sleeve which houses second 7")

All tracks are written by Bloc Party.

| No. | Title | Producer(s) | Length |
|---|---|---|---|
| 1. | "I Still Remember" | Jacknife Lee | 4:36 |
| 2. | "Atonement" | Eliot James | 3:49 |

- Wichita / WEBB125SX (UK)

All tracks are written by Bloc Party.

| No. | Title | Producer(s) | Length |
|---|---|---|---|
| 1. | "I Still Remember" | Jacknife Lee | 4:36 |
| 2. | "Cain Said to Abel" | Eliot James | 3:24 |

=== CD ===
- Wichita / WEBB125SCD (UK)

All tracks are written by Bloc Party.

| No. | Title | Producer(s) | Length |
|---|---|---|---|
| 1. | "I Still Remember" | Jacknife Lee | 4:36 |
| 2. | "Selfish Son" | Eliot James | 4:58 |
| 3. | "I Still Remember" (Music Box and Tears Remix) | Jacknife Lee; Lull | 5:03 |

=== Promo CD ===
All tracks are written by Bloc Party.

| No. | Title | Length |
|---|---|---|
| 1. | "I Still Remember" (radio edit) | 3:51 |
| 2. | "I Still Remember" (UK radio edit) | 3:50 |
| 3. | "I Still Remember" (album version) | 4:24 |

== Charts ==
| Chart (2007) | Peak position |
|---|---|
| Switzerland Airplay (Swiss Hitparade) | 58 |
| UK Singles Chart | 20 |
| UK Airplay (Music Week) | 22 |
| US Alternative Airplay (Billboard) | 24 |
| US Bubbling Under Hot 100 (Billboard) | 19 |
