= 2042 (album) =

Studio album by Kele Okereke
- Released: 8 November 2019
- Length: 1:01:59
- Label: Kola

Kele Okereke chronology
Fatherland (2017)	2042 (2019)	The Waves Pt. 1 (2021)

Professional ratings
Aggregate scores
Source	Rating
Metacritic	72/100
Review scores
Source	Rating
DIY	4/5 stars
NME	4/5 stars
Pitchfork	6.1/10

2042 is the fourth studio album by English musician Kele Okereke. It was released on 8 November 2019 through Kola Records.

The first single "Jungle Bunny" was released on 4 September 2019.

== Critical reception ==
2042 was met with generally favourable reviews from critics. At Metacritic, which assigns a weighted average rating out of 100 to reviews from mainstream publications, this release received an average score of 72, based on 6 reviews.

== Track listing ==
2042 track listing
No.	Title	Length
1.	"Jungle Bunny"	3:49
2.	"Past Lives"	1:15
3.	"Let England Burn"	3:36
4.	"St Kaepernick Wept"	4:22
5.	"Guava Rubicon"	3:41
6.	"My Business"	4:15
7.	"Ceiling Games"	5:45
8.	"Where She Came From"	0:25
9.	"Between Me and My Maker"	5:59
10.	"Natural Hair"	3:45
11.	"Cyril's Blood"	4:11
12.	"Secrets West 29th"	4:52
13.	"Catching Feelings"	3:24
14.	"A Day of National Shame"	1:16
15.	"Ocean View"	4:28
16.	"Back Burner"	5:56

== Personnel ==
Credits adapted from Discogs.

- Kele Okereke – lead vocals, lead guitar, songwriting
- Gethin Pearson - producer, mixer, engineer
- Ben Jackson - engineer
- Alex Novle - cover
- Alessandro Comotti - graphic design
- Paolo Proserpio - graphic design
- Robin Schmidt - mastering
- Asia Werbel - photography
