= Tenderoni (Kele Okereke song) =

Single by Kele

from the album The Boxer
- Released: 11 June 2010
- Recorded: 2010
- Genre: Electro house; new rave
- Length: 4:30 (album version); 3:40 (radio edit)
- Label: Wichita; Glassnote
- Songwriter: Kele Okereke
- Producer: XXXChange

Kele singles chronology
"Believe" (2005)	"Tenderoni" (2010)	"Everything You Wanted" (2010)

Music video
- "Tenderoni" on YouTube

"Tenderoni" is the first single by Kele Okereke from his debut album, The Boxer. It was released as a download from iTunes on 13 June 2010 in the UK and 11 June in Australia, and was released on CD format on 14 June 2010. The song has similarities with "Wearing My Rolex" by Wiley. It was also used in the video game Gran Turismo 5 and was featured in trailers for the video game Sonic Generations.

== Critical reception ==
Hayden Woolley of Drowned in Sound commented that "it's clear that he's not just wearing Wiley's Rolex, rather he's nicked off with it altogether and is parading it round as his own". The Guardian's music section commented that it liked Kele's new direction, "even if it does stray close to other electro anthems" such as Wiley's "Wearing My Rolex". Writing for Pitchfork, Ryan Dombal gave the song an overall positive review, commenting that after listening to the song, he "suddenly felt the urge to go to the gym".

The song reached a peak position of number 31 on the UK Singles Chart of 20 June 2010. The following week, the single fell seven places, despite support from the release of the album: "The Boxer". The single did however manage to reach a current peak of number six on the UK Dance Chart.

== Uses in popular culture ==
- In Australia, the song was used by the Nine Network during its coverage of the NRL semi-final football match between the Sydney Roosters and Penrith Panthers.
- The song can also be heard on the Gran Turismo 5 soundtrack.
- The instrumental version of the song can be heard in most of Sonic Generations gameplay trailers.
- In the United States, the song was used in an episode of the CBS drama series NCIS: Los Angeles.
- This song is heard in Grand Theft Auto VI in the Flash FM radio station.

== Music video ==
=== Development ===
The music video for "Tenderoni" was uploaded to YouTube on 5 May 2010. It was directed by Greko Sklavounos.

=== Reception ===
Andrew Winistorfer of Prefix Magazine described the music video as "pretty cool," but "in the way an advertisement for Brita water filters looks pretty cool."

== Remixes ==
"Tenderoni" was first remixed by Larry Tee and Beckwith and was put on Kele's website as a free download for a short period of time. The song has also been remixed by Jungle Fiction, XXXChange (the song's producer), Punches, Zdar, Dam Mantle and Kris Menace.

There is also a section on Kele's website for fans to remix "Tenderoni".

Remixes of the song by Larry Tee and Beckwith, Dam Mantle, Punches and Kris Menace were also available on Kele's SoundCloud page for free download for a short period of time.

== Track listings ==
European CD single
No.	Title	Length
1.	"Tenderoni" (radio edit)	3:40
2.	"Tenderoni"	4:30
3.	"Tenderoni" (instrumental)	4:31

Australian iTunes EP
No.	Title	Length
1.	"Tenderoni"	4:30
2.	"One Day of Strength"	3:42
3.	"Tenderoni" (Larry Tee and Beckwith remix)	6:38
4.	"Tenderoni" (Dam Mantle remix)	4:57

UK iTunes EP
No.	Title	Length
1.	"Tenderoni"	4:30
2.	"One Day of Strength"	3:42
3.	"Tenderoni" (Larry Tee and Beckwith remix)	6:38
4.	"Tenderoni" (Kris Menace remix)	6:00

UK 7" single
No.	Title	Length
1.	"Tenderoni" (Zdar mix)	4:30
2.	"One Day of Strength"	3:42

UK 12" single
No.	Title	Length
1.	"Tenderoni" (Larry Tee and Beckwith remix)	6:38
2.	"Tenderoni" (XXXChange dub)	6:07

== Charts ==
Chart (2010)	Peak position
Australian Singles Chart	58
Australian Dance Singles Chart	12
Austrian Singles Chart	63
Belgian Tip Chart (Flanders)	4
Belgian Tip Chart (Wallonia)	14
Belgian Dance Singles Chart	28
Scottish Singles Sales (Official Charts)	32
UK Singles (Official Charts)	31
UK Singles Downloads (Official Charts)	35
UK Dance (Official Charts)	6
