= The Flames Pt. 2 =

Studio album by Kele
- Released: 24 March 2023
- Length: 40:18
- Label: KOLA Records; !K7

Kele chronology
The Waves Pt. 1 (2021)	The Flames Pt. 2 (2023)

Singles from The Flames Pt. 2
- 1. "Vandal" Released: 25 November 2022; 2. "True Love Knows No Death" Released: 13 January 2023; 3. "Someone To Make Me Laugh" Released: 19 February 2023

The Flames Pt. 2 is the sixth studio album by English musician Kele Okereke. As its title suggests, the album serves as a companion piece to Okereke's previous album The Waves Pt. 1 (2021). It was released on 24 March 2023, through Okereke's own Kola Records.

== Background and recording ==
Like The Waves before, The Flames was performed entirely by Okereke, and recorded in his home studio with co-writer and producer Gethin Pearson. In an interview with The Line of Best Fit, Okereke said of the two albums:

I'm seeing these records as a kind of Yin & Yang thing. If the sound of pt.1 is the listener drifting off to a happy, peaceful place, pt. 2 is the sound of being woken up very loudly.

== Singles ==
The first single, "Vandal", was released on 25 November 2022. The cover art for "Vandal" features Okereke burning a copy of The Queen Is Dead by the Smiths. The second single, "True Love Knows No Death", was released on 13 January 2023. The cover art for the single features Okereke burning a copy of Silent Alarm – an album by his band, Bloc Party. The third single, "Someone To Make Me Laugh", was released on 19 February 2023. The cover art for the single features Okereke burning a copy of the book Less Than Zero by Bret Easton Ellis.

== Critical response ==
Professional ratings
Review scores
Source	Rating
Clash	7/10 stars
Far Out	3/5 stars
Loud and Quiet	6/10 stars
The Line of Best Fit	7/10 stars

The Flames Pt. 2 received positive reviews from critics. Robin Murray of Clash in a positive reviews praised the album's introspective lyrics. Far Out's Tyler Golsen opined "The Flames, Part 2 is ultimately a record that is split in its identity. As a companion piece to The Waves, Part 1, it's a satisfying conclusion that bridges the two records in complementary ways. As its own release, The Flames can feel maddingly slight. Still, it's not like going back and listening to the engrossing sounds of The Waves is a homework assignment" and that the context of his previous album, was needed to The Waves Pt. 1 fully appreciate it. Jasleen Dhindsa from Loud and Quiet said "intensive, absorbing record, even in its more gentle moments, partly due to all sounds recorded coming from one instrument: Kele's guitar".

The Line of Best Fit's Kate Crudgington lauded the album opining it is a "Poetically bookending a time of intense reflection and growth".

== Track listing ==
The Flames Pt. 2 Track listing
No.	Title	Length
1.	"Never Have I Ever"	4:13
2.	"Reckless"	2:36
3.	"And He Never Was The Same Again"	4:14
4.	"True Love Knows No Death"	2:54
5.	"Vandal"	3:31
6.	"Her Darkest Hour"	3:01
7.	"No Risk No Reward"	3:01
8.	"Someone To Make Me Laugh"	3:21
9.	"I'm In Love With An Outline"	4:18
10.	"Acting On A Hunch"	2:26
11.	"Kerosene"	3:24
12.	"The Colour of Dying Flame"	3:22
Total length:		40:18

== Personnel ==
- Kele Okereke – all vocals and instruments
- Gethin Pearson – production, songwriting
