= The Boxer (album) =

Studio album by Kele
- Released: 21 June 2010
- Recorded: 2009–2010; (Royan Castle, New York)
- Genre: Electronic; alternative dance; electro house; breakbeat
- Length: 46:34
- Label: Wichita; Shock
- Producer: XXXChange

Kele chronology
Intimacy (2008)	The Boxer (2010)	The Hunter (2011)

Singles from The Boxer
- 1. "Tenderoni" Released: 14 June 2010; 2. "Everything You Wanted" Released: 16 August 2010; 3. "On the Lam" Released: 25 October 2010

The Boxer is the debut solo album by Kele Okereke, the lead singer of British indie rock band Bloc Party. Okereke released the album under the professional name of Kele on 21 June 2010.

== Release ==
As promotion, he uploaded the songs "Rise" and "Walk Tall" to his personal website on 13 May. The first single from The Boxer was "Tenderoni", released on 14 June, and the second, "Everything You Wanted", on 16 August. The album's third single "On the Lam" was released on 25 October.

The album was released by Wichita Recordings worldwide, except for the US and Canada (Glassnote Records), Australia (a co-release with Shock Records and Co-Op) and Japan (a co-release with Hostess Entertainment). Vinyl copies of the album were released by Wichita and Polydor.

The digital and Japanese versions of the album included bonus tracks and remixes in addition to the standard 10 tracks.

== Critical reception ==
Professional ratings
Review scores
Source	Rating
Allmusic	4/5 stars
The A.V. Club	(B+)
Clash	(8/10)
Drowned in Sound	(5/10)
The Guardian	3/5 stars
Los Angeles Times	3/4 stars
MusicOMH	4.5/5 stars
NME	(7/10)
Pitchfork	(5.1/10)
Slant	2.5/5 stars
Spin	7/10 stars

The Boxer received generally favourable reviews from critics, currently holding an aggregate score of 70 on Metacritic.

It received very positive reviews from Allmusic (4/5), Clash (8/10), MusicOMH (4.5/5) and The A.V. Club (B+).

== Track listing ==
No.	Title	Length
1.	"Walk Tall"	3:45
2.	"On the Lam"	3:33
3.	"Tenderoni"	4:30
4.	"The Other Side"	3:52
5.	"Everything You Wanted"	3:49
6.	"The New Rules"	3:55
7.	"Unholy Thoughts"	2:55
8.	"Rise"	5:11
9.	"All the Things I Could Never Say"	5:32
10.	"Yesterday's Gone"	4:07

Digital bonus track
No.	Title	Length
11.	"Meet in the Middle"	5:25

Japanese bonus tracks
No.	Title	Length
11.	"Tenderoni" (Larry Tee and Beckwith remix)	6:38
12.	"Tenderoni" (XXXChange dub)	6:07
13.	"Tenderoni" (Kris Menace remix)	6:00

== Personnel ==
Credits adapted from Discogs.

- Kele Okereke – lead vocals, songwriting, art direction

=== Additional musicians ===
- Jodie Scantlebury – backing vocals (tracks 2, 4, 6, 8 and 9)
- Bobbie Gordon – backing vocals (tracks 2, 4, 8 and 9)

=== Production ===
- XXXChange – production, audio mixing (tracks 1, 2, 4, 6, 9 and 10), recording (at Royan Castle, New York)
- Chris Coady – mixing (track 3)
- Phillipe Zdar – mixing (tracks 5, 7 and 8)
- Ben Jackson – recording (at EMI Studios, London)
- Scott McCormick – recording (at EMI Studios, London)
- Mike Marsh – mastering (at The Exchange, London)

=== Design ===
- Sarah Piantadosi – photography
- Richard Robinson – design
- Nova Dando – art direction

=== Publishing ===
- Wichita Recordings – publishing
- Shock Records – publishing (in Australia, with Wichita Recordings and Co-Op)
- Glassnote Records – publishing (in the US and Canada)
- Hostess Entertainment – publishing (in Japan, with Wichita Recordings)
- Polydor Records – publishing (vinyl, with Wichita Recordings)

== Release history ==
Region	Release date	Format	Label
Australia	18 June 2010	CD; digital download	Wichita; Shock
UK	21 June 2010	CD; digital download	Wichita
UK	21 June 2010	Vinyl	Wichita; Polydor
North America	22 June 2010	CD; digital download	Glassnote
Japan	23 June 2010	CD; digital download	Hostess; Wichita

== Charts ==
=== Album ===
Chart (2010)	Peak Position
Australian Albums Chart	35
Austrian Albums Chart	71
Belgian Albums Chart (Flanders)	41
Belgian Albums Chart (Wallonia)	89
French Albums Chart	178
Swiss Albums Chart	98
Irish Albums Chart	41
UK Albums Chart	20
UK Dance Chart	2

=== Singles ===
Song	Chart positions					
Song	UK	UK Dance	AUS	AUT	BEL (FLA)	BEL (WAL)
"Tenderoni"	31	6	63	58	4	14
"Everything You Wanted"	93	17	—	—	—	—
"On the Lam"	—	—	—	—	—	—
