= Murder of Christopher Alaneme =

2006 murder in Sheerness, England

Christopher Alaneme (1 October 1987 – 21 April 2006) was a British teenager. He was eighteen years old when he was murdered on 21 April 2006 in Sheerness, England, by Peter Connolly, a painter and decorator who was living in London at the time.

== Biography ==
Alaneme was born at Farnborough Hospital in Orpington, London, on 1 October 1987. His parents, Gabriel and Agatha Alaneme, moved from Nigeria to live in Britain in the 1970s. He had three sisters, Maryann, 21, Jane, 16, and Grace, 12, and in their early years they lived in Bromley, south-east London. Alaneme left London to escape the violence of the big city and pursue a new life in a coastal town. He was a family friend of Kele Okereke, singer and guitarist of the band Bloc Party, who wrote their song "Where Is Home?" about his murder and dedicated it to him.

The eighteen-year-old died from a fatal wound to his abdomen. The five men charged with his murder were Londoners who had travelled to Kent that day to stay at a caravan park. They had spent the evening drinking in pubs in Sheerness before crossing the path of Alaneme and his friends in the street at around midnight.

== Mark Davies ==
In the space of 90 seconds, Mark Davies, an off-duty taxicab driver who got caught up in their "indiscriminate" violence, the court heard, was also knifed. Davies, who was out celebrating his birthday, was stabbed five times as he got up from a bench outside the Bar One pub to see what was going on. He received severe injuries which left him with medical problems he will face for the rest of his life.

== Police investigations ==
The day after the murder of Alaneme, the police released that a man was arrested over a "gang stabbing" and they believed there were at least four people involved in the attack. On 26 April two men were arrested on suspicion of murder and attempted murder, while police are looking for three other men, possibly from London, in connection with the incident.

In early May, four men, arrested on suspicion of murder and attempted murder, were released on bail. The police still wished to speak to Peter Connolly and were urging anyone who knew of his whereabouts to contact them.

On 12 September 2006, five men were charged with the murder of Alaneme. The defendants were Connolly, 29, a painter and decorator, of Carisbrooke Gardens, Peckham; Andrew Giblin, 26, a bank worker, of Bromyard House, Commercial Way, Peckham; Terence Beaney, 23, a plasterer, of Rideout Street, Woolwich; and brothers Sean Duhig, 23, and Gerry Duhig, 27, both plasterers, of Melbury Drive, Camberwell.

On 29 September 2006, Gerry Duhig, 27, of Camberwell, south London, was given conditional bail after an in-chambers application at Maidstone Crown Court. Four other men remain in custody at Belmarsh Prison after an earlier hearing, accused of fatally stabbing the teenager in Sheerness, in April.

On 27 November 2006, all five men, who are from south east London, pleaded not guilty to murder at Maidstone Crown Court, before a trial date was set for 1 October 2007. Three men – Connolly, Giblin and Beaney – also denied a charge of wounding with intent. They were remanded in custody. Sean and Gerry Duhig, brothers aged 23 and 27, remain on conditional bail.

On 9 October 2007, Connolly, Giblin and Beaney were also charged with wounding with intent after the stabbing of Davies. On 20 November 2007 brothers Sean and Gerry Duhig were cleared of murdering Christopher Alaneme. Three other men from London still standing trial accused of Alaneme's murder. Beaney, Giblin, and Connolly, all deny the charge. They also pleaded not guilty to another charge of wounding with intent in the stabbing of Davies.

== Racism ==
Police say Alaneme, who was black, was racially abused before the attack. "After speaking to witnesses, we believe there were words said prior to the incident that suggest racial motivation was a factor," said Supt Steve Corbishley.

It also led to a public inquiry, chaired by Sir William Macpherson of Cluny, whose report forced the police and other public bodies to change the way they deal with race issues, hate crimes and murders. But despite the undoubted improvements made in the investigation and handling of racist crime, the number of race-hate incidents reported to the police has continued to grow. Chief constables have argued that the rise in reported racist incidents is a positive development and reflects ethnic minorities' growing confidence in the police to deal with their complaints in a sympathetic and even-handed manner. Last year there were more than 59,000 racist incidents reported to the police, a rise of 12 per cent on the previous year. But the true scale of the problem is far higher. The British Crime Survey estimates that there are more than 200,000 racially motivated incidents every year.

Although there were racial connotations to the events of 21 April, and there was no dispute that racist remarks had been made, the judge, who could have imposed an additional tariff for racial aggravation, determined at a sentencing hearing that this was not a clear racial crime. Because the remarks had not been uttered by Connolly and Connolly had gone on to attack a white man, the judge could not be satisfied that racism was the specific motivation in the murder.

== Connolly's trial and sentence ==
On 1 October 2007, the trial of Connolly started. A week later, on 9 October 2007, the prosecutor said: "This case isn't about a late night punch up, it's about a group of five friends who in two separate incidents closed in on unarmed men, causing serious injuries to one and death to the other." He added: "These pitiless stabbings were completely without a semblance of justification."

On 10 December 2007, Connolly was found guilty of killing Alaneme. He was also found guilty of wounding with intent to cause grievous bodily harm to Davies. Giblin and Beaney were cleared of all charges at Maidstone Crown Court. The judge ordered the jury to return a not guilty verdict regarding the Duhig brothers.

On sentencing, Judge Mr Justice Goldring told Connolly: "From the beginning you have not shown the slightest remorse. You sought to mislead the police." With regard to the knife, the judge said: "You must have contemplated its use."

The jury heard how Connolly, who had been visiting Sheerness for the weekend, took drugs and drank heavily, before setting out into Sheerness town centre, already carrying the weapon that killed Alaneme and severely injured Davies. He was sentenced to a minimum of 15 years for murdering Christopher Alaneme, and sentenced for 10 years, to run concurrently, for wounding Davies.
