= The Waves Pt. 1 =

Studio album by Kele
- Released: 28 May 2021
- Genre: Electronic, rock, experimental
- Label: KOLA Records; !K7

Kele chronology
2042 (2019)	The Waves Pt. 1 (2021)	The Flames Pt. 2 (2023)

The Waves Pt. 1 is the fifth studio album by English musician Kele Okereke. It was released on 28 May 2021 through Kola Records. Upon release, it received positive reviews from critics.

== Background and recording ==
The Waves Pt. 1 was released on 28 May 2021 with the label KOLA Records / !K7. Pitchfork called it a "the product of lockdown recording and late-night walks through London as the stay-at-home father of two passed time posting guitar covers on Instagram."

== Critical response ==
Professional ratings
Aggregate scores
Source	Rating
Metacritic	69/100
Review scores
Source	Rating
Clash	8/10 stars
Pitchfork	7.3/10 stars
The Observer	2/5 stars
NME	3/5 stars

The Waves Pt. 1 received a score of 69/100 on review aggregator Metacritic based on eight reviews, indicating "generally favorable reviews". Marc Hogan of Pitchfork called it "as low-key and eccentric as [Kele] he's ever sounded". The Observer's Damien Morris was more critical opining: "Its self-indulgence fits well with Okereke's fifth solo album. Songs of dubious quality sidle in and out, unsure how they should be listened to, or why. There are occasional pleasant interludes and codas, particularly during "From a Place of Love" and "The Patriots"." Jenessa Williams from NME labelled it "Adding interesting new textures to his playbook, it’s perhaps helpful to think of The Waves Pt.1 as a soundtrack to something bigger, the wading out to sea before the full immersive plunge".

== Track listing ==
The Waves Pt. 1 Track listing
No.	Title	Length
1.	"Message From The Spirit World"	4:10
2.	"They Didn't See It Coming"	4:26
3.	"The Way We Live Now"	2:47
4.	"How To Beat The Lie Detector"	4:39
5.	"Dungeness"	3:27
6.	"Nineveh"	4:25
7.	"The One Who Held You Up"	3:46
8.	"The Patriots"	3:04
9.	"Intention"	4:18
10.	"Smalltown Boy"	4:22
11.	"From A Place Of Love"	3:05
12.	"The Heart Of The Wave"	2:41
13.	"Cradle You (Bonus Track)"	4:42
Total length:		49:58

== Personnel ==
- Written and performed by Kele Okereke
