= The Hunter (EP) =

EP by Kele
- Released: 7 November 2011
- Recorded: 2011
- Genres: Alternative dance, electro house, dubstep, synthpop
- Length: 29:05
- Labels: Wichita, Liberator
- Producers: Fred Falke, Kele, Daniel Lindegren, QNESS, RAC, XXXChange

Kele chronology
The Boxer (2010)	The Hunter (2011)	Trick (2014)

Singles from The Hunter
- 1. "What Did I Do?" Released: 23 September 2011

The Hunter is the first EP (and follow up to the 2010 solo album The Boxer) by Kele Okereke (under the professional name Kele), lead singer and rhythm guitarist of the British rock band Bloc Party. It was released on 7 November 2011 by Wichita Recordings in the UK, set back a week from the original release date, and 3 days earlier on 4 November 2011 by Wichita Recordings and Liberator Music in Australia. The first single released from the EP was "What Did I Do?", which features guest vocals from Lucy Taylor. The music video was released on 13 September 2011, with the song released as a digital single in Japan 10 days later.

== Background ==
The EP was announced about 2 weeks after Bloc Party met up in New York City to begin the writing process for their fourth studio album.

The EP's first single was "What Did I Do?", which features vocals from singer Lucy Taylor. The music video was released on 13 September 2011, with the song released as a digital single in Japan 10 days later. A remix of the single by All The Lights was released as a single by Liberator Music to the Australian iTunes Store on 16 November 2011.

The EP featured production from XXXChange (who was responsible for the production on Kele's first solo release, The Boxer), RAC, Fred Falke and QNESS, with Sub Focus also mixing the lead single. The EP also sees Kele doing production work for the first time, producing the track "Cable's Goodbye".

It contains six original songs, as well as a cover of Q Lazzarus' song "Goodbye Horses". Speaking to This Is Fake DIY, Kele said, about the cover of "Goodbye Horses":

It’s one of my favourite songs of all time. I’ve never done a cover before. It’s quite an iconic song because it was used in quite a famous sequence in Silence of the Lambs. I really like the image in the lyrics. To me, it’s a song about transcendence. It felt right to do and I hope that I’ve done it justice. I am glad that I get to reintroduce the song to a whole generation of people who have never heard it.

— Kele Okereke, on "Goodbye Horses" and his cover of it

== Musical style ==
The musical style of the EP differs from Kele's first solo effort, The Boxer, in that it explores into adding dubstep basslines, synthpop elements and dancehall tones to songs, while still keeping some of the experimental elements of The Boxer's production.

== Coverage ==
Despite the EP's lead single "What Did I Do?" being publicised by many major magazines online, the EP itself was not widely reviewed. At the time of release a statement from Bloc Party's guitarist, Russell Lissack, was circulating in the press suggesting that Kele was no longer a part of the band and that they were planning to audition new singers. The band later indicated that this was not the case, as did Okereke when he posted pictures of him working with the other Bloc Party band members on his own website.

== Critical reception ==
Professional ratings
Review scores
Source	Rating
Drowned in Sound	(5/10)
The Independent	3/5 stars
This Is Fake DIY	(7/10)

Drowned in Sound were rather critical of the album, stating that the track 'Release Me' "is irredeemably poor, a beige-by-numbers of bland synth stabs and trite lyrics that somehow manages to be both incredibly dull and, like the EP’s cover, unintentionally hilarious". However, they were also more positive with mixed comments regarding the song "Love as a Weapon", calling it "the clear standout" of the EP, noting that it "builds from glitches and light percussion into a mesh of samples and piano arpeggios and hummed melodies lifted straight from 'The Prayer'".

This Is Fake DIY gave the EP a score of 7/10, criticising the tone of Kele's lyrics, stating that The Hunter "sees Kele complete his journey from indie rock miserabalist to dubstep, floorfilling… miserabilist", and the EP's title, saying that "after the release of The Boxer, Kele continues his attempt to lay claim to all traditionally masculine roles with The Hunter", they jokingly added that "contenders for his next album title could be The Brickie or The Mechanic". The generally favourable review did however praise the EP in other areas, stating that "for the most part, this is an EP of arms aloft, triumphant club bangers - of someone comfortable with their voice and with their sound".

The Independent commented that main producer XXXChange "brings a bracing electro sensibility to proceedings". They also recommended the songs "Release Me", "Devotion" and "Cable's Goodbye".

== Commercial performance ==
Commercially, the EP performed poorly, charting only in Australia with a peak of 79 on the Australian Albums Chart, and a peak of number 27 on the Australian Digital Albums Chart.

The lead single, "What Did I Do?", also only achieved a chart position in Australia, reaching a peak of 82 on the ARIA Digital Track Chart and 18 on the Australian Dance Chart.

== Track listing ==
No.	Title	Writer(s)	Producer(s)	Length
1.	"What Did I Do?" (featuring Lucy Taylor)	Kele Okereke	XXXChange	3:38
2.	"Release Me"	K. Okereke	RAC, QNESS (add.)	3:49
3.	"Devotion"	K. Okereke	XXXChange	4:28
4.	"Goodbye Horses" (Q Lazzarus cover)	William Garvey	Daniel Lindegren, Fred Falke (add.)	4:12
5.	"Cable's Goodbye"	K. Okereke	Kele	3:39
6.	"Love as a Weapon"	K. Okereke	XXXChange	4:47
7.	"You Belong to Someone Else"	K. Okereke	XXXChange	4:32
Total length:				29:05

== Personnel ==
Credits adapted from The Hunter CD booklet.

- Kele Okereke - lead vocals (tracks 2–7), backing vocals (track 1), production (track 5), songwriting (all tracks except 4)

=== Additional musicians ===
- Lucy Taylor - lead vocals (track 1), backing vocals (tracks 4 and 5), flute (track 5)
- William Garvey - songwriting (track 4)
- Dan Smith - slide guitar (track 6)
- Jack Tarrant - additional guitar (track 6)
- Jodie Scantlebury - backing vocals (track 7)
- Bobbie Gordon - backing vocals (track 7)

=== Production and mixing ===
- XXXChange - production (tracks 1, 3, 6 and 7), mixing (tracks 3, 6 and 7)
- Sub Focus - mixing (track 1)
- RAC - production (track 2)
- QNESS - additional production and mixing (track 2)
- Daniel Lindegren - production (track 4)
- Fred Falke - additional production and mixing (track 4)
- Ben Jackson - mixing (track 5), recording (all tracks)
- Scott McCormick - recording (all tracks)
- Guy Davie - mastering (at Electric Mastering)

=== Artwork ===
- Cathal O'Brien - photography
- Rob Crane - design

=== Publishing ===
- Wichita Recordings - publishing
- Liberator Music - publishing (in Australia, with Wichita Recordings)
- PIAS Entertainment Group - manufacturing and distribution
- EMI/Kobalt Music - song publishing (all tracks except 4)
- Sony/ATV - song publishing (track 4)

=== Management ===
- Tony Perrin - management
- Simon White - management

== Release history ==
Region	Release date	Format	Label
Australia	4 November 2011	CD, digital download	Wichita, Liberator
UK	7 November 2011	CD, digital download, vinyl	Wichita
US	8 November 2011	Digital download	Wichita
Japan	8 November 2011	Digital download	Wichita

== Chart performance ==
=== Album ===
Chart (2011)	Peak position
Australian Albums Chart	79
Australian Digital Albums Chart	27

=== Singles ===
Song	Peak	
Song	AUS	AUS Dance
"What Did I Do?"	82	18
