= What Did I Do? =

Single by Kele featuring Lucy Taylor

from the album The Hunter
- Released: 23 September 2011
- Recorded: 2011
- Genre: Dubstep, electro house
- Length: 3:38
- Label: Wichita, Liberator
- Songwriter(s): Kele Okereke
- Producer(s): XXXChange

Kele singles chronology
"Ready 2 Go" (2011)	"What Did I Do?" (2011)	"Turn It Around" (2013)

Lucy Taylor singles chronology
"What Did I Do?" (2011)

Music video
- "What Did I Do?" on YouTube

"What Did I Do?" is a song by Kele Okereke, released as the first single from his EP The Hunter. The song's music video was released on 13 September 2011, with the song being released as a digital single in Japan 10 days later. The song features vocals from singer Lucy Taylor. The single was produced by constant collaborator XXXChange and mixed by Sub Focus.

The single's cover is the same as the cover for The Hunter EP.

On 16 November 2011, Liberator Music released a remix of the single by All The Lights to the Australian iTunes Store.

On Boxing Day 2011, a remix by Sander van Doorn was released to Beatport, released on Doorn Records. The single is billed to Kele vs. Sander van Doorn featuring Lucy Taylor. A music video (simply a re-edited version of the original video) was released.

== Music video ==
The song's music video was released on 13 September 2011 to Kele's official YouTube channel. As of 23 November 2011, the video has 295939 views.

The music video was directed by Nova Dando, with the dancers styled by Nadine Artois.

== Track listings ==
Digital Download
No.	Title	Producer(s)	Length
1.	"What Did I Do?" (featuring Lucy Taylor)	XXXChange	3:38

All The Lights Remix
No.	Title	Producer(s)	Length
1.	"What Did I Do?" (All The Lights Remix) (featuring Lucy Taylor)	XXXChange, All The Lights (add.)	6:31

Sander van Doorn version
No.	Title	Producer(s)	Length
1.	"What Did I Do?" (vs. Sander van Doorn) (featuring Lucy Taylor)	Sander van Doorn, XXXChange (add.)	5:22

== Charts ==
Chart (2011)	Peak position
Australian Singles Chart	82
Australian Dance Singles Chart	18
