= A Weekend in the City =

Studio album by Bloc Party
- Released: 24 January 2007
- Recorded: 2006
- Studios: The Garage (Kent, England); The Garden (London); Olympic (London); RAK (London); Mayfair (London); Grouse Lodge (Westmeath, Ireland)
- Genres: Indie rock; alternative rock
- Length: 51:13
- Label: Wichita
- Producer: Jacknife Lee

Bloc Party chronology
Silent Alarm Remixed (2005)	A Weekend in the City (2007)	Intimacy (2008)

Singles from A Weekend in the City
- 1. "The Prayer" Released: 29 January 2007; 2. "I Still Remember" Released: 9 April 2007; 3. "Hunting for Witches" Released: 9 July 2007; 4. "Flux" Released: 12 November 2007 (on re-release)

A Weekend in the City is the second studio album by British indie rock band Bloc Party. It was recorded at Grouse Lodge Studios in Westmeath, Ireland, in mid-2006 and was produced by Jacknife Lee. The album was refined and mixed at several locations in London at the end of 2006. It was released on 24 January 2007 in Japan and in the first week of February in the rest of the world, with Wichita Recordings as the primary label. The album peaked at number two on the UK Albums Chart and on the Irish Albums Chart. In the United States, it entered the Billboard 200 at number 12.

Bloc Party worked to craft an album that distanced them from the conventional guitar band set-up by incorporating more electronically processed beats and additional instrumentation. Computer programs were extensively used to enrich and amend recorded takes, while a string sextet was hired to perform on some of the tracks. The subject matter of frontman and chief lyricist Kele Okereke's lyrics for A Weekend in the City covers issues such as drug use, sexuality, and the media's use of moral panic surrounding issues such as terrorism. The album's three original singles, "The Prayer", "I Still Remember", and "Hunting for Witches", address these themes respectively.

Bloc Party's new musical directions and more forthright lyrics either impressed or alienated critics. Reviewers generally treated A Weekend in the City as an important stepping stone for the band members in their quest for musical maturity, while The Guardian included it in its list of the "1000 Albums To Hear Before You Die". In November 2007, the album was re-released globally—with the final single, "Flux", as a bonus track—to coincide with Bloc Party's extensive touring schedule.

== Origins ==
All band members of Bloc Party conceived A Weekend in the City during 2005 while on tour in support of their critically acclaimed debut album Silent Alarm. Despite missing their home city of London, the quartet became increasingly disillusioned with the culture in the area each time they sporadically returned. Band member Gordon Moakes has noted, "The contrast we saw between being away on tour and being home ... we would see that London wasn't changing really and that the people we'd grown up with were part of that." Okereke wrote many songs in 2005 and early 2006 and used a concept he called "Urbanite Relaxation" to expand upon the themes of life and leisure in the metropolis. The band recorded around 30 soundchecks for the initial lyrics using a MiniDisc player. The rest of the tracks were written in April 2006 before they entered the studio recording process.

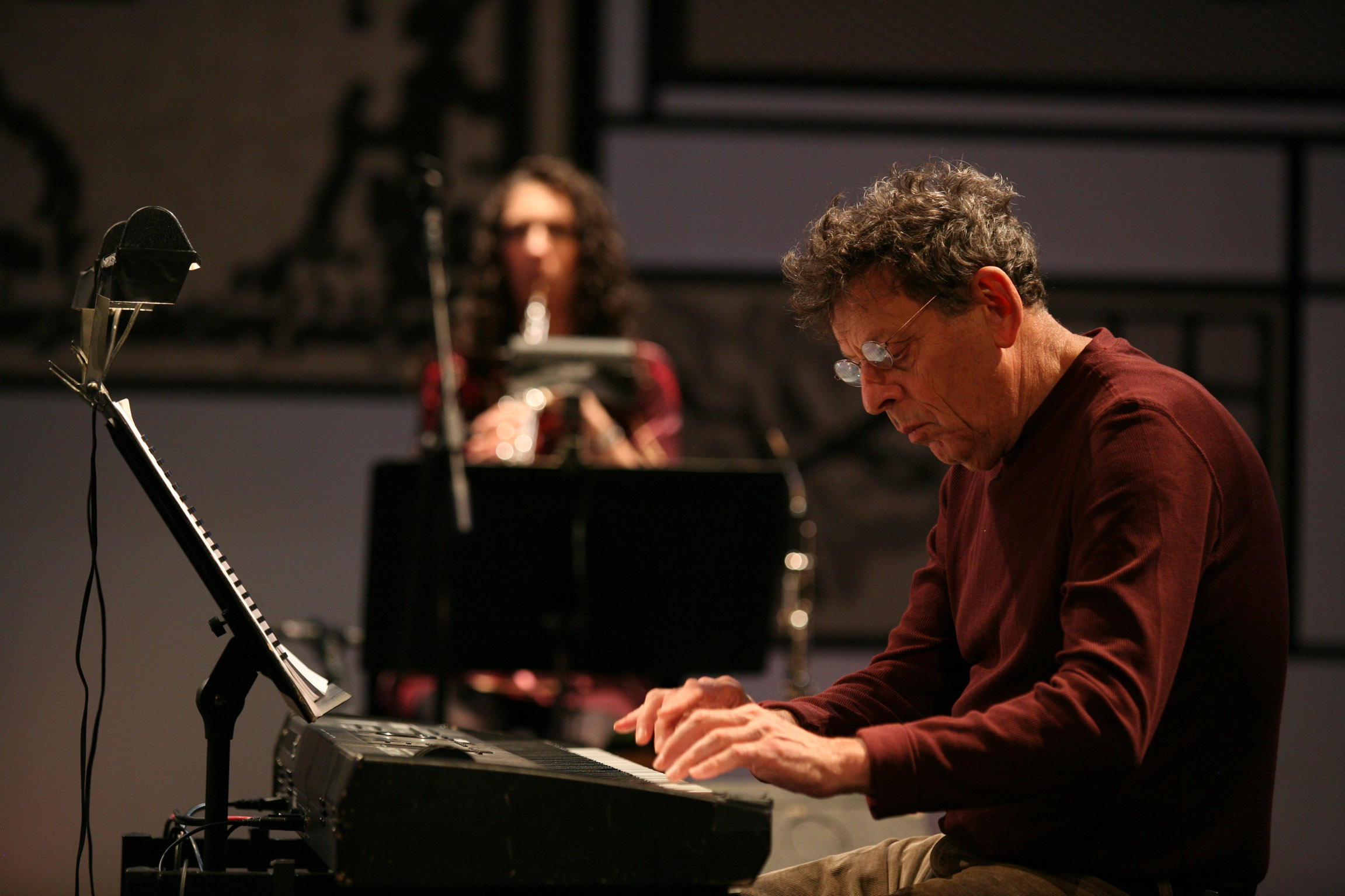
The music of minimalist composer Philip Glass inspired the band in composing A Weekend in the City

The band members drew up a shortlist of possible producers in early 2006, which included dance music-oriented staff such as Chemical Brothers sound engineer Steve Dub and high-profile producers like Garret "Jacknife" Lee. At the time, Moakes told Rolling Stone that the album would hopefully include electronic, processed beats and a sound in the vein of alternative rock band Radiohead and indie rock ensemble TV on the Radio. Bloc Party wanted to expand their sonic palette without losing the musical "jerkiness" of Silent Alarm. They selected Lee—who had worked with world-renowned act U2 and indie rock band Snow Patrol—based on the rapport that developed between the two parties while recording the demo song "I Still Remember", which later appeared in A Weekend in the City.

Moakes has explained the choice of producer by stating that the band members were looking to work with someone who could help them craft an accomplished album, "although as much as anything it's about finding someone who you'd want to spend six weeks in an enclosed space with". Before the studio sessions, Bloc Party listened to varied musical sources, from composers Philip Glass, György Ligeti, and Krzysztof Penderecki to urban artists Amerie and Missy Elliott. The band members were largely disillusioned with the evolution of contemporary guitar music and aimed to re-create the highly stylised production values of R&B and hip-hop records, while relying on an atmosphere similar to neo-classical music.

== Recording ==
In mid-2006, Bloc Party travelled to Lee's Grouse Lodge Studios in Westmeath, Ireland, to record A Weekend in the City. The band members initially worked by experimenting with their respective instruments and sound check arrangements. Moakes additionally focused on using different types of synthesiser. All parties soon moved to the main recording room, a large area with "a lot of natural ambience" according to sound engineer Tom McFall. A makeshift booth was built around the back of the drum kit to reduce any sonic interference, while a roof was sometimes used over drummer Matt Tong to isolate a pure sound. Different types of microphones were used for each component of the drum kit. The miking scheme was crucial to prepare the drum tracks for the looping and processing Lee planned using production program Logic.

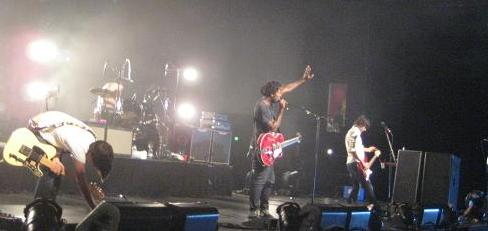
Bloc Party before the performance of "I Still Remember" in Sydney on 4 August 2007; Okereke often opted to use a Gretsch Tennessee Rose guitar, which creates a softer sound, in the studio and in concert

The band worked by setting up all the instruments with only a single power amplifier. McFall has pointed out that distorted and heavily compressed mics were used to capture some of the room's ambience "to add a bit of grit" to the instrumental tracks; the recordings were often processed further using distressors, special types of compressor noted for their distinctively aggressive sound. The production staff tried other unconventional effects once the basic tracks were recorded. The band sometimes performed while Tong's kit was re-amped and played sections live while a brick was placed on the sustain pedal of a piano to capture the vibrations during the performances. During the six weeks at Grouse Lodge, Bloc Party tried multiple versions of songs and, at times, attempted playing live alongside recorded versions of the same track.

Lee recorded everything using Pro Tools and treated the parts as individual stereo files in Logic. The drum and guitar tracks were processed using computers. Much of the synthesiser-sounding parts of the album were generated by Russell Lissack's lead guitar following his extensive use of pedal effects. Lee added the live string, synth, drum machine, sample, and ambient noise tracks to create an expansive, hyper-stereophonic final product. After finishing the instrumental album, Bloc Party left Ireland to continue touring. Okereke later returned to Lee's studio to add the vocal tracks to the album; he has noted that he tried to "convey range and dynamics" rather than simply yelp the lyrics. Several track names were changed following the voice sessions: "Merge on the Freeway" became "Song for Clay (Disappear Here)", "A Prayer to the Lord" was renamed "The Prayer", "Wet" became "On", and "Perfect Teens" was renamed "Where Is Home?".

== Promotion and release ==
"One thing that we've learnt from touring over the last two years is that there are other ways to be powerful whilst making music, rather than being completely full on, 100 miles per hour. We learnt so much about the power of arrangements. I know it sound cheesy, but I guess it is going to be a more grown up Bloc Party."

— Kele Okereke, on Bloc Party's musical evolution up to 2007 and its audible results on A Weekend in the City

Bloc Party confirmed a preliminary track list of 13 songs in August 2006; this included future bonus tracks "England" and "We Were Lovers". A low-quality rip of A Weekend in the City was leaked in November and showed a track list of 11 songs. Wichita Recordings did not comment, but the band members were quoted as being worried about a reduction in the potential impact of the album's content and sales. Bloc Party started a promotional tour of North America the same month with Panic! at the Disco, but cut it short after three concerts when Tong suffered a collapsed lung. The focus was changed to interviews throughout the world to explain the album's stylised lyrics and composition in the run-up to its release.

Final tweaks on the album were completed in December 2006 in London. A high-quality version was leaked in January 2007 and its contents were confirmed by Okereke. Journalists who obtained an official copy of the album's final mix suggested that it featured electronically tampered rock soundscapes in the vein of Radiohead, New Order, and Björk. Bloc Party previewed A Weekend in the City in its entirety on 24 January 2007 at the Bournemouth Old Firestation, a performance which coincided with the Japanese release of the album. The first single, "The Prayer", was released on 29 January. The band performed at a special BBC Radio 1 showcase at Maida Vale Studios on 30 January as a precursor to a February promotional tour of the UK.

The album was released in the rest of the world in the first week of February. The title comes as a tangent to the central theme of the album, "the living noise of a metropolis". The cover art is part of A Modern Project by German photographer Rut Blees Luxemburg, famous for her night cityscapes of London and for the cover art of The Streets' Original Pirate Material. The photograph is an aerial image of London's Westway, which shows the road and the adjacent sports pitches lit by the sodium glow of street lamps, and was chosen because the band believed "it was important we captured London breathing". Luxemburg has explained that "in this picture you can see how intricately and optimistically public space in the city is shared".

== Content ==
=== Lyrics ===
Okereke's lyrics attempt to juxtapose the monotonous events—nights out on club dancefloors and waiting for a train—with the seemingly epic experiences—terrorist attacks and racial angst—witnessed in a city environment. The direct narrative approach divided reviewers. BBC's Tom Young concluded, "Some will appreciate Kele's openness and revel in his philosophical focus on modern lives ... others will be too distracted by questionable content such as ... lines about sudoku to take Okereke's grumbles into consideration." Okereke has conceded that he was disappointed with the abstraction in Silent Alarm; he used The Smiths as inspiration to try to make a personal album with "a real centre". The lyricist has noted, "I wanted it to be a snapshot, a frozen moment in time. Like in a city, with thousands of stories going on at once, layered on top of each other ... Although I might be speaking through the voice of a character, I'm still expressing, perhaps, my sentiments."

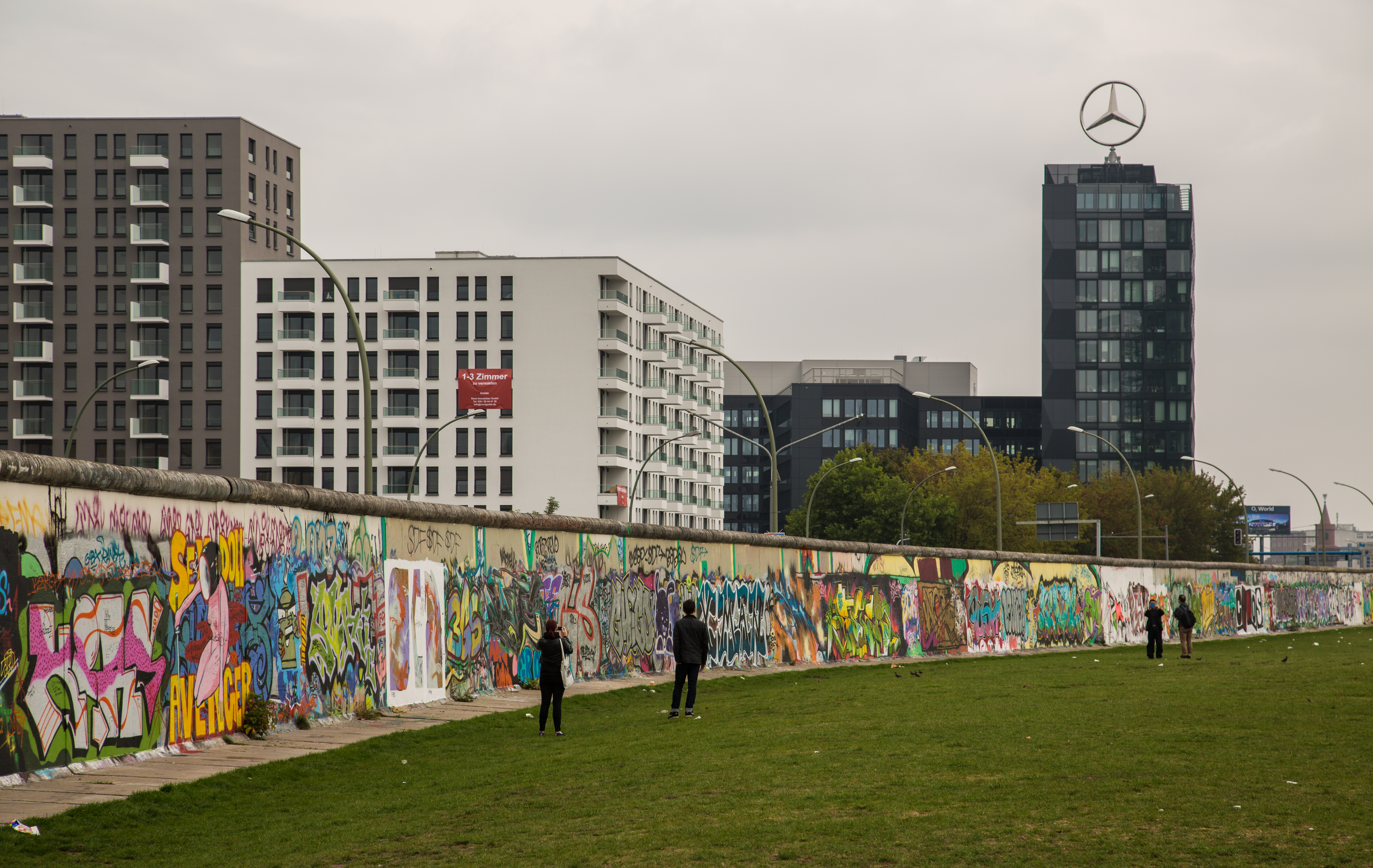
The song "Kreuzberg" tells a story set in the Berlin area of the same name, and mentions its East Side Gallery (pictured).

The words to "Where Is Home?" begin at the funeral of Christopher Alaneme, a black teenager stabbed to death in Kent in April 2006 in a racially motivated attack. Okereke has described him as a "cousin" due to their Nigerian mothers' close friendship. The track castigates right-wing newspapers for perpetuating a hysterical fear of black youths in hoodies, an action which often leads to opportunities being denied to the Black British community at large. Populist media is also the target of "Hunting for Witches" (with the right-wing tabloid Daily Mail being singled out for criticism), whose subject matter is terrorism, namely the 7 July 2005 London bombings. Okereke has stated, "I guess the point about the song for me is post-September 11th, the media has really traded on fear and the use of fear in controlling people." Two songs, "Kreuzberg" and "I Still Remember", explore sexuality and homosexuality; the former is an account of promiscuity in the Berlin area of the same name, while the latter details an unrequited crush of a boy for his schoolmate.

The leading track, "Song for Clay (Disappear Here)", was inspired by Less than Zero, a novel by Bret Easton Ellis which depicts excessive hedonism and its effects on individuals. The song title references the protagonist Clay and a billboard in the book which displays the phrase "Disappear Here", while the action is relocated to Les Trois Garçons restaurant in Shoreditch, East London. "Waiting for the 7.18" provides an escapist counterpoint by mentioning a trip to Brighton following disillusionment with working life in the capital. The fifth song on A Weekend in the City, "Uniform", references London again and criticises the youth subculture in the area. It is directly inspired by Douglas Rushkoff's Merchants of Cool documentary, which details the corporate exploitation of popular culture by advertisement companies.

Okereke read Guy Debord's The Society of the Spectacle and Henri Lefebvre's Critique of Everyday Life, works which analyse how people experience leisure in modern societies, and was inspired to pen several songs which detail the drug and drink culture present in a metropolis. "The Prayer" is based on drug use during nights out in clubs, while "On" specifies the effects and after-effects of cocaine. Okereke tried to treat the tracks as explanations of people's actions, rather than moralising tales; he has stated, "In a time when so many people feel they can't communicate or feel hemmed in, I can see the appeal of cocaine." "Sunday" details the morning-after hangover following a drunken and promiscuous night out, while "SRXT" takes the form of a suicide note following the loneliness and despair of hedonism in the metropolis. The album closer is named after Seroxat, a trade name for the antidepressant paroxetine, and was crafted following the suicide attempts of two of Okereke's friends after they left university in 2005.

=== Composition ===
'The Prayer'
Industrial rhythms, complex drumming patterns, and layered vocals were used in "The Prayer". The song has a multitracked layout inspired by R&B music and illustrates Lee's hyper-stereophonic production aesthetic.

A Weekend in the City is largely built around a mix of distorted and layered guitars, electronic elements, and multilayered vocals. The creation of compositions required a high level of technical proficiency and led to songs "tinged with discord". The opening section of "Song for Clay (Disappear Here)" includes a bare falsetto, while "Hunting for Witches" starts with a John Cage-like collage of spliced voices from random radio broadcasts as its main rhythm. The rest of the second track makes extensive use of guitar pedal effects and includes a heavily distorted riff. Moakes has pointed out that the original sound check of "Waiting for the 7.18" was a ballad with a simple rhythmic pattern on the glockenspiel before the band members added a drum and bass section to its second half. "Kreuzberg", "I Still Remember", and "Sunday" are the few songs to provide a counterpoint to the musical manipulation on the rest of the album by having more conventional indie rock arrangements; Moakes has called the compositions "lush, without being too syrupy".

In A Weekend in the City, layered vocals are often used to resemble choral sections, for example in the middle of "The Prayer" and throughout "Uniform", which has over 100 stacked vocal tracks. "SRXT" is a chiming ballad directly inspired by Brian Eno's "By This River" and incorporates double-tracked lead and background vocals. Synthetic aspects—drum machines, synths, and computer glitches—were included as integral parts of compositions. "The Prayer" is built around a computer sample and includes MTV Base-inspired urban contemporary beats and a prominent guitar solo towards the end. "On" is also a computer-reworked live take. Half of the song was recorded as a series of loops of drum beats and bass guitar chords. The recorded take was split in two to make up the first and last quarters of the track, while the middle section was intentionally left blank for the band to improvise in. "On" is one of two songs, together with "Where Is Home?", to use a string sextet. The latter track includes erratic rhythms and clashing guitars.

== Critical reception ==
Media response to A Weekend in the City was mixed, but generally positive; aggregating website Metacritic reports a normalised rating of 65/100 based on 30 critical reviews. Louis Pattison of NME described the album as "tender and reflective, edgy and embittered; a difficult and emotional beast that jolts with nervous electricity" and pointed out that its notable achievement is that it finds moments of genuine contentment amidst "a maelstrom of anger and confusion". AllMusic's Heather Phares did not find the album as immediate as Bloc Party's earlier work, but noted that "its gradual move from alienation to connection and hope is just as bold as Silent Alarm, and possibly even more resonant". Drowned in Sound's Mike Diver called it "dirty, dishevelled, unsure and paranoid; fearful, easily distracted, boisterous and ashamed; reckless, wild, nervous and terrified; graceful, thought-provoking, clumsy and contradictory ... and very nearly perfect." Jeff Miller of the Chicago Tribune concluded, "For Bloc Party, Silent Alarm was a baby step and this is a giant leap."

Michael Endelman of Entertainment Weekly was less receptive and stated, "Too often, the music on A Weekend in the City is less memorable than the ambitious subject matter." Robert Christgau, reviewing for Rolling Stone, suggested that the album fails because it lacks "killer choruses", while Sia Michel of The New York Times wrote that the multitracked vocals and baroque effects do not have "the wiry catchiness" of Bloc Party's previous work. Mike Schiller of PopMatters commented that the sonic direction the band had moved to was unsuited to the members' musical strengths, while Dorian Lynskey of The Guardian stated "grand statements are not earnest frontman Kele Okereke's forte...there's barely a song that isn't kneecapped by one of Okereke's lyrical clangers".

The album was named by Los Angeles Times in its unnumbered shortlist of the best releases of 2007. It figured in several other end-of-year best album lists, notably, at number eight by Gigwise, at number nine by Hot Press, and at number ten by The A.V. Club. The Guardian included A Weekend in the City in its "1000 Albums To Hear Before You Die" list compiled in November 2007 and praised the band's "ambitious indie soundscapes packing a sizeable political punch".

== Commercial performance ==
A Weekend in the City was a commercial success and entered the UK Albums Chart, the Irish Albums Chart, and the Australian Albums Chart at number two. The album was listed at number 56 on the end-of-year UK Albums Chart for 2007 and was certified Gold by the British Phonographic Industry. In the US, it sold 47,726 copies in its first week of release and entered the Billboard 200 at number twelve, a marked improvement on predecessor Silent Alarm which had only made number 114 when it was released in 2005. The album also topped the Billboard Top Independent Albums. According to Nielsen SoundScan, it had sold 148,000 copies in the US by August 2008. More than one million copies have been sold worldwide.

The first single, "The Prayer", became Bloc Party's highest charting song on the UK Singles Chart and on the Irish Singles Chart to date by peaking at number four and number 18 respectively. The song reached number 20 in Australia and is the band's only Australian Singles Chart career entry. The next single and the first US release from the album, "I Still Remember", entered the Hot Modern Rock Tracks at number 24 and became the band's highest charting US single to date. The third single, "Hunting for Witches", failed to chart in the US, but peaked at number 22 in the UK.

== Tours and re-release ==
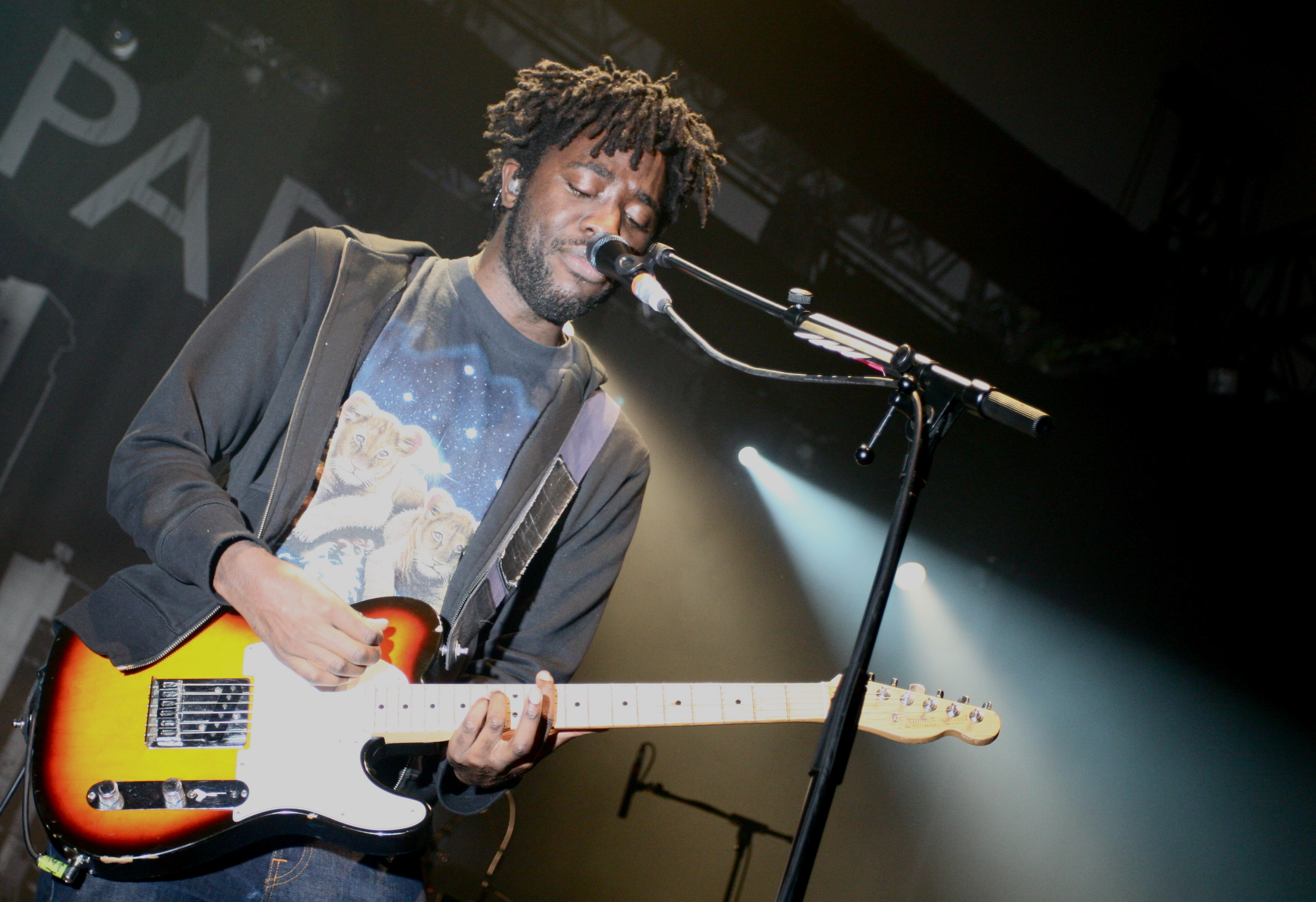
Okereke on stage in Barcelona on 26 November 2007 as part of the Flux Tour

Bloc Party started a lengthy promotional world tour for A Weekend in the City in March 2007, which included concerts in Japan, the US—where they also headlined at the SXSW Festival in Austin, Texas—Canada, and Italy. A few UK performances in mid-April were followed by a month-long headlining tour with Biffy Clyro, which covered most of mainland Europe. Bloc Party spent the end of May and the start of June 2007 on another headlining tour of the US and were asked to play at Live Earth upon their return to London. The band performed at the main stages of several European summer fests, including Glastonbury, T in the Park, the Reading and Leeds Festivals, Oxegen, and Summercase.

Bloc Party embarked on their second major worldwide tour for the album in August 2007, playing across Australia, the US, Mexico, and Canada. Upon their return to Europe, the band performed at the BBC Electric Proms with the Exmoor Singers as backing chamber choir. The final single from A Weekend in the City, "Flux", was released on 12 November 2007 after the European Flux Tour; a promotional CD of remixes of the song was given out free with the 14 November issue of NME. The track gave Bloc Party another top 10 hit in the UK Singles Chart by entering at number eight. A Weekend in the City was re-released with "Flux" in the track list on 16 and 19 November in mainland Europe and the UK respectively.

== Track listing ==
All tracks are written by Bloc Party.

No.	Title	Length
1.	"Song for Clay (Disappear Here)"	4:49
2.	"Hunting for Witches"	3:31
3.	"Waiting for the 7.18"	4:17
4.	"The Prayer"	3:44
5.	"Uniform"	5:32
6.	"On"	4:46
7.	"Where Is Home?"	4:54
8.	"Kreuzberg"	5:27
9.	"I Still Remember"	4:23
10.	"Flux" (Not included on initial release)	3:38
11.	"Sunday"	4:59
12.	"SRXT"	4:51

Australian deluxe edition bonus tracks
No.	Title	Length
12.	"Uniform" (James Rutledge Remix)
13.	"Hunting for Witches" (Fury666 Remix)
14.	"I Still Remember" (Speaker Junk Bass Bin Remix)
15.	"Hunting for Witches" (Crystal Castles Remix)

=== Bonus tracks ===
When present, all songs follow "SRXT" on the January/February 2007 release after a silent three-minute pregap.

- "Secrets" (Canadian edition and Target version) – 4:06
- "The Once and Future King" (Canadian edition and Target version) – 3:20
- "England" (Japanese edition) – 4:15
- "We Were Lovers" (Japanese edition) – 4:12
- "Emma Kate's Accident" (Best Buy version) – 5:38
- "Version 2.0" (Best Buy version) – 3:19
- "Rhododendrons" (US eMusic download version) – 4:49
- "Atonement" (US iTunes download pre-order version) – 3:46
- "Cain Said to Abel" (US iTunes download version) – 3:24
- "Selfish Son" (Napster and Rhapsody download versions) – 4:59

Another B side, "Vision of Heaven" (3:32), was released as a promotional track exclusively at PureVolume.

=== Additional formats ===
Vinyl

- Two LP versions of A Weekend in the City were released: a standard black vinyl copy in a gatefold sleeve and a limited edition picture disc version that has the album cover printed on Side A and the track listing printed on side B.

DVD

- In February 2007, a CD+DVD set contained in a red case was released in the UK and Europe simultaneously with the regular CD version of the album. The DVD contains footage of Bloc Party at Grouse Lodge and music videos for "The Prayer" and "I Still Remember".
- An Australian edition of the CD with an extra DVD was released in July 2007. The DVD contains remixes of "Hunting for Witches", "Uniform", and "I Still Remember", and live footage of the band at a special Channel 4 showcase.
- A new version of the CD+DVD was released in the UK and Europe in November 2007. This DVD contains live footage of the band at the 2007 Reading Festival and music videos for the album's four singles.

== Personnel ==
Credits adapted from the liner notes of A Weekend in the City.

Bloc Party

- Kele Okereke – lead vocals, rhythm guitar
- Russell Lissack – lead guitar
- Gordon Moakes – bass guitar, backing vocals, synthesiser, glockenspiel, electronic drums
- Matt Tong – drums, drum machine, backing vocals

Additional musicians

- Jacknife Lee – programming, keys
- Sam Bell – additional programming
- James Banbury – string arrangements and cello on "On", "Where Is Home?"
- Everton Nelson – violin on "On", "Where Is Home?"
- Lucy Wilkins – violin on "On", "Where Is Home?"
- Alison Dodds – violin on "On", "Where Is Home?"
- Jeremy Morris – violin on "On", "Where Is Home?"
- Vincent Greene – viola on "On", "Where Is Home?"
- Liz Neumayer – backing vocals on "Waiting for the 7.18", "Where Is Home?", "SRXT"

Technical personnel

- Jacknife Lee – production, additional engineering
- Tom McFall – engineering
- Sam Bell – additional engineering; additional programming
- Rowen Rossiter – engineering assistant (at Grouse Lodge)
- Andrew Rigg – engineering assistant (at Mayfair)
- Cenzo Townsend – mixing
- Neil Comber – mixing assistant
- Rut Blees Luxemburg – photography
- Rob Crane – design

== Release history ==
Region	Date	Label	Format(s)	Catalog
Japan	24 January 2007	V2 Records	CD	V2CP-320
Europe	2 February 2007	Wichita Recordings	CD, CD+DVD	WEBB120
Australia	2 February 2007	Wichita Recordings	CD	WEBB120
United Kingdom and Ireland	5 February 2007	Wichita Recordings	CD, digital download, CD+DVD, LP	WEBB120
United States	6 February 2007	Vice Records	CD, digital download, LP	VICE 94598
United States	6 February 2007	Vice Records	CD (Best Buy version)	VICE 94700
United States	6 February 2007	Vice Records	CD (Target version)	VICE 94677
Canada	6 February 2007	Vice Records	CD	VICE 94677
Australia	16 July 2007	Universal Records	CD+DVD	3628120
Europe	16 November 2007	Universal Records	CD+DVD (new edition)	3628120
United Kingdom and Ireland	19 November 2007	Wichita Recordings	CD+DVD (new edition)	WEBB120X
Australia	3 December 2007	Wichita Recordings	CD (new edition)	WEBB120X

== Chart positions ==
=== Weekly charts ===
Chart (2007)	Peak position
Australian Albums (ARIA)	2
Austrian Albums (Ö3 Austria)	12
Belgian Albums (Ultratop Flanders)	2
Belgian Albums (Ultratop Wallonia)	12
Canadian Albums (Billboard)	7
Danish Albums (Hitlisten)	24
Dutch Albums (Album Top 100)	19
Finnish Albums (Suomen virallinen lista)	10
French Albums (SNEP)	10
German Albums (Offizielle Top 100)	5
Irish Albums (IRMA)	2
Italian Albums (FIMI)	26
Japanese Albums (Oricon)	13
New Zealand Albums (RMNZ)	5
Norwegian Albums (VG-lista)	16
Portuguese Albums (AFP)	25
Scottish Albums (Official Charts)	2
Swedish Albums (Sverigetopplistan)	24
Swiss Albums (Schweizer Hitparade)	8
UK Albums (Official Charts)	2
US Billboard 200	12
US Independent Albums (Billboard)	1
US Top Rock Albums (Billboard)	3

=== Year-end charts ===
Chart (2007)	Position
Australian Albums (ARIA)	87
Belgian Albums (Ultratop Flanders)	22
French Albums (SNEP)	194
UK Albums (OCC)	56

Singles

Song	Peak			
Song	UK	IRE	US Mod. Rock	AUS
"The Prayer"	4	18	X	20
"I Still Remember"	20	—	24	—
"Hunting for Witches"	22	—	—	—
"Flux"	8	41	—	—

"—" denotes releases that did not chart.
"X" denotes song not released in a particular country.
