= Top 10 Hits of the End of the World =

Studio album by Prince Rama
- Released: November 6, 2012
- Studios: "Ariel Pink’s Haunted Graffiti’s studio" Gravelvoice Studios in Seattle, Washington
- Genres: Pop; electronic; psychedelia; drone rock
- Length: 39:21
- Label: Paw Tracks
- Producer: Scott Colburn

Prince Rama chronology
Utopia = No Person (2012)	Top 10 Hits of the End of the World (2012)	Xtreme Now (2016)

Singles from Top 10 Hits of the End of the World
- 1. "So Destroyed" Released: August 10, 2012; 2. "Those Who Live For Love Will Live Forever" Released: September 27, 2012; 3. "Welcome to the Now Age" Released: October 26, 2012

Top 10 Hits of the End of the World is a studio album by psychedelic dance duo Prince Rama consisting of sisters Taraka and Nimai Larson. Produced by Scott Colburn, it is a "retrospective requiem of all pop albums ever made" where Prince Rama revives the spirits of ten fictional musical acts who died during the apocalypse to perform hits: Arabian group Guns of Dubai, English dance act I.M.M.O.R.T.A.L.I.F.E., mafia musical group Nu Fighters, protest band Rage Peace, architect group Taohaus, Bollywood film soundtrack duo Goloka, Black Elk Speaks, virtual group Hyparxia, "dancerise" duo The Metaphysixxx, and commercially successful group Motel Memory.

The apocalypse concept of Top 10 Hits of the End of the World was inspired by the works of Chris Marker, Paul Laffoley, and Jean Baudrillard and continues Prince Rama's idea of the "now age" present in their previous records, where a period or moment becomes lost once it is named a "now age." A major theme of the album is based on musical acts in real life that "possess" the spirits of musical groups and artists that came before, such as Lady Gaga channeling Madonna and Creed channeling Pearl Jam. Musically, Top 10 Hits of the End of the World was influenced by pop music from several nations such as Arabian territories, France, Sweden, and Cambodia. It also includes elements of several genres such as what Paw Tracks' press release described as "tribal goth," "motorcycle rock," and "ghost-modern glam."

Promoted with three pre-album-release singles ("So Destroyed," "Those Who Live For Love Will Live Forever," and "Welcome to the Now Age") and two music and multimedia (for "So Destroyed" and "Those Who Live For Love Will Live Forever"), Top 10 Hits of the End of the World was released by the label Paw Tracks on November 6, 2012. Several professional music journalists were polarized with Top 10 Hits of the End of the World; some reviewers felt that the album did not contain elements promised by its concept and the press release, and some critics criticized the duo for departing from the style and sound that defined them on their previous records. However, the LP also garnered many positive responses from other critics, some calling it Prince Rama's best album while others praising the concept for how it benefited its music.

== Concept ==
Kanu bhai Taraka Larson, while looking through the history of songs that topped Billboard's Hot 100 chart, noticed "eerie correlations between some of the apocalypses and their corresponding #1 hits," such as "Til the World Ends" by Britney Spears ranking number one on the week Harold Camping predicted a rapture: "I'm really fascinated by how pop music becomes this vehicle for mass consciousness to encode messages of mass destruction. It's the perfect disguise. So I thought, wow, if the world ended this year, what would the #1 hit singles be?" This influenced Larson to make a record with the concept of a compilation album of apocalyptic number-one hits.

Described by Paw Tracks' press release as a "retrospective requiem of all pop albums ever made," Top 10 Hits of the End of the World is a set of post-apocalyptic hits by fictional musical acts, a concept writer Lindsay MaHarry described as "meta-textual role-playing." On the LP, Prince Rama "channel[s]" the ghosts of these acts who were killed in an apocalypse. Its main theme is time periods being "possessed" by later or earlier eras. Taraka Larson explains that the LP deals with "the present being possessed by the past, the past being haunted by the future, [and] the future being eclipsed by present nostalgia." Real-life examples of artists "channeling" spirits of acts that came before include Lady Gaga channeling Madonna and Creed channeling Pearl Jam.

The post-apocalyptic elements of Top 10 Hits of the End of the World's concept were inspired by La Jetée (1962), a science fiction featurette by Chris Marker. Prince Rama praised the film for "making amnesia romantic again through a series of still images that create a post-apocalyptic environment." In making the LP, the group also read about the concepts of Hauntology, Jean Baudrillard's theories about history, and essays by visionary artist Paul Laffoley on "Thanaesthetics," "Zombie Aesthetics," and time travel. The use of fake band stories and the duo taking photos of themselves as these groups was compared by critic Amanda Farah to the project Strange Little Girls (2001) by Tori Amos.

Like past Prince Rama releases, Top 10 Hits of the End of the World follows the idea of the "Now Age," where a period or moment becomes lost once it is named a "now age." Taraka described recreating the apocalypse as "illusive" as remaking "the now" in that they "both exist in a suspended moment which links the End with the Eternal." In regards to an idea of the LP of the combination of a utopia and an apocalypse, she explained that a utopia is a "No Place" based on Thomas More's definition of the term and that pop music involves ending humanity and "place" in order to create a utopian viewpoint: "In its obsession with hi-fi, it strives to eradicate all traces of place, and creates an alternative reality where all sounds are polished and isolated in an echoless paradise. In its obsession with image, it strives to eradicate all traces of aging and mortal imperfection and strives to create an iconic ideal; replicable, untouchable, immortal."

== Composition ==
Top 10 Hits of the End of the World is a psychedelic indie drone rock album in the style of music from the cassette tape compilation C86 (1986) using raga compositional structures and a "Hindu atmosphere," wrote Paul Lester of The Guardian. As with previous Prince Rama albums, Top 10 Hits of the End of the World follows an acid-influenced jam band style that contains tribal digital drum sounds, what writer Stuart Stubbs described as "cyclic" structures, rototoms, eastern percussion, Casio-style sounds, Sanskrit-style chants, analog synthesizers, and several filters of reverb, echo, and distortion.

In making the music of Top 10 Hits of the End of the World, Prince Rama was influenced by pop, pop punk, and synthpop music from a variety of nations such as Arabian territories, France, Sweden, and Cambodia. Since most of Top 10 Hits of the End of the World was recorded in Seattle, Prince Rama garnered influences from the works of American rock band Nirvana. The album also features elements of new wave, cosmic disco, grunge, what the press release described as "tribal goth," "motorcycle rock," and "ghost-modern glam."

Top 10 Hits of the End of the World has garnered comparisons to artists such as Bananarama, Siouxsie & the Banshees, Haysi Fantayzee, Kajagoogoo, and Zodiac Mindwarp by critics. A writer for The Phoenix categorized it in the same league as the works of artist M.I.A. due to its combination of "odd modalities and ceremonial percussion" with elements of pop music, club music, "sexy gothic atmospheres," and "repetitive hooks." Willcoma of Tiny Mix Tapes wrote, "played at the proper volume, the songs imbue a towering miasma of spacey fascination and perhaps even kitsch-love." He wrote that the duo's love for psychedelic and synthesizer music on the LP is "fetishistic like so many other pillagers of those key periods, but it is (as with Ariel Pink) too restless to be a calculated homage."

== Fictional group biographies and song information ==
- Guns of Dubai was an Arabian musical act who posed as members of the military government of the House of Sabah. Information about who was in the group remains unknown; the members had to hide their identity due to laws by the United Arab Emirates government that prohibited women playing music publicly. Their music was distributed through bootleg cassette tapes packaged in artillery. When the apocalypse came, they died from a gunshot wound. Their track that appears on Top 10 Hits of the End of the World is "Blade of Austerity," which, as Adam Kivel, a journalist for Consequence of Sound, analyzed consists of a snake charming synthesizer and a "lumbering bass."
- I.M.M.OR.T.A.L.I.F.E., or Inner Messages Morphing Over Resonant Time, Always Loving Infinitely Free and Everlasting, was an English group that created hymnal dance music that heavily influenced love and sexual activity. The members of the group went by the anonymous I.M.M.OR.T.A.L.I.F.E. name due to a sex cult in London-based underground nightclubs that took place in the early 1980s. The group was frozen to death following a thirteen-day orgy when the world ended. Their song “Those Who Live For Love Will Live Forever” appears on Top 10 Hits of the End of the World and is a Giorgio Moroder-style disco track that uses lyrics like “I am here/ I love you” to show how crucial love is in an apocalypse. It was described by reviewer Ryan Reed as "Tainted Love" by Soft Cell "after a handful of Ambien."
- The Nu Fighters was a duo of musicians under the stage names Maxx and Midnight whose song "No Way Back" won a Grammy Award for Song of the Year in 1989. The members were parts of an underground outlaw motorcycle gang in Los Angeles where they were involved in criminal activity such as murdering, pimping, prostituting, and grave robbing. It was not until they landed on America's Most Wanted list for six cases of murder that their activity became known to a wider public. Thus, they committed suicide by riding a motorcycle off a cliff.
- Rage Peace was a protest band formed in the early 1990s. Described by the press release as "the Bob Dylans of a whole generation of angry youth," Rage Peace made tracks that mainly used elements of pop music in their instrumentals and had lyrics that promoted violence. The group started what was known as the Rage Peace movement, a series of organized events that involved violence and destruction of buildings and cars. By the time the apocalypse came, the members were found dead in a limousine that was on fire. Their song for Top 10 Hits of the End of the World, "So Destroyed," consists of synthesizer bongos performing dub rhythms and a "swanky" bass riff, wrote Kivel.
- Taohaus was a group of what the press release described as "radical rejected architects" who built a monastery in the Black Forest. Their style of architecture was a combination of modernism and the "simplicity" of the religion Taoism, which was amplified by the music they created for worshipping. One of the worshipping pieces they wrote was “Receive." As the press release explains, it is "a mantra for all those wishing to clear their minds and cast a light on their shadows." The track borrows elements of progressive rock in terms of how it builds towards a climax, analyzed Reed. Members of Taohaus were burned to death from a tree that was struck by lightning when the end of the world came.
- Goloka was a duo of sisters Latara Mangareshkar and Rasha Bahsel who sang for the soundtracks of more than 900 bollywood films and garnered the name of "the jewels on the crown of Indian cinema." The name Goloka was synonymous with the term Bollywood during the 1960s. The duo died from smoke suffocation while they attended a screening of "their largest production to date," since a frame of the film burned and turned the whole theatre on fire.
- According to the press release, in an unspecified time, people of the Oglala Sioux tribe found lights in the sky that were transmitting messages; some suggested it was communication from the spirit of the Black Elk, while others thought it was a much more menacing spirit transmitting through light. This persuaded some of Oglala Sioux's chief tribesman to spend every hour in the field listening to the lights, and they kept hearing new songs from the spirit. These songs were also recorded and released by an Austrian ethnomusicologist who named them “Black Elk Speaks." This went against the will of the tribesmen, and the lights ordered them to burn themselves by making fire out of their tipis. The burning made the tribesmen merge with the light and rid them of their sins. “Fire Sacrifice," the last recorded transmission by the spirit, appears on Top 10 Hits of the End of the World.
- Hyparxia was a computer-programmed group with the purpose to translate a utopian society into music. The computer only created chords, harmonies and pitches that would please a listener's ear, avoiding any harmonic dissonance. The programmers listened to a decade amount of soft rock records and ran surveys to determine what most people would think of as “pleasant listening.” They were most notable for their song “Welcome to the Now Age” that most children sang during the "Now Age era." The track contains elements of reggae and involves the vocalist singing in a Madonna-style whisper. The computer crashed during what was known as the 2012 Great Collapse.
- The Metaphysixxx was a "dancercise" duo of two women named Kris and Katya. The two members were originally planning to be basketball players but failed due to having too many drug overdoses. They then did "dancercise" routines where they exercised while on MDMA and codeine. They later ran "dancercise" workouts at the YMCA which the duo would become notable before. They took ecstasy and intentionally collapsed from running on a treadmill when they got the news an apocalypse was about to happen.
- Motel Memory was a commercially successful musical duo of two singers named Kim and Tina. The two women were originally raised by their parents to be Miss America pageants, but after singing in an Oklahoma City song competition, they decided to become singers. The group sold three platinum-certified records and a number-one hit titled “We Will Fall in Love Again," which was on the top of the Billboard charts for nine months, and won seven Grammy awards throughout their career. On December 21, 2012, Kim and Tina shot each other in a standoff at Motel 6 forced upon by Tina's fiancée. "We Will Never Fall in Love Again" is an Eurythmics-esque power ballad serving as Top 10 Hits of the End of the World's closing track. Martyn Young of musicOMH described it as "all over the place with keyboards and synths spiralling off an all sorts of tangents while the sisters vocals coalesce into one spellbinding rapture."

== Artwork ==
The cover art of Top 10 Hits of the End of the World was designed by Jo Cutri. It is a 1980s-style cover that displays the phrase "As Seen On TV" and uses Sega Genesis-style typography. The artwork ranked number 23 on a list of "The 25 Best Album Covers of 2012" by Complex magazine where they praised its "so bad it's good" aspect.

== Release and promotion ==
"So Destroyed" was the lead single of Top 10 Hits of the End of the World, premiering via Stereogum on August 10, 2012. Lachlan Kanoniuk wrote a mixed review of the song for Australian magazine Beat upon its release; she praised the group for decreasing the "more obnoxious" aspects of their previous works but also found the track "forgettable" overall. For making an official video on the song, Prince Rama held a "So Destroyed Dance Contest," where people submitted videos of themselves dancing to the track. The participants received a "custom mixtape" by the duo, and the winner earned "custom dancing shoes," a physical album signed by the group, and a chance to dance on a live performance. The contest ended on October 1, 2012, The video was released on December 11, 2012 and received a positive review from critic Amrit Singh who called it "exploratory, unserious, diffuse, and most importantly, perfectly silly, which is nice counterpoint to the self-seriousness that usually accompanies concept projects."

“Those Who Live For Love Will Live Forever” was released as Top 10 Hits of the End of the World's second single on September 27, 2012. MOCAtv and the Los Angeles Museum of Contemporary Art created an official low-quality 1980s-science-fiction-style video for the track which was released on November 6, 2012. The third single of the album was "Welcome to the Now Age," issued on October 26, 2012. Top 10 Hits of the End of the World was digitally and physically distributed across the world by label Paw Tracks on November 6, 2012.

== Critical reception ==
Professional ratings
Aggregate scores
Source	Rating
Album of the Year	60/100
AnyDecentMusic?	5.9/10
Metacritic	65/100
Review scores
Source	Rating
AllMusic	2.5/5 stars
Consequence of Sound	2/5 stars
Drowned in Sound	7/10
Loud and Quiet	8/10
Paste	5.4/10
Pitchfork	6.8/10
The Phoenix	3.5/4 stars
Q	3/5 stars
The Skinny	2/5 stars
Tiny Mix Tapes	3.5/5 marks

Despite mixed to decent scores from review aggregate sites, Top 10 Hits of the End of the World garnered generally baffled opinions from professional music journalists. AllMusic's Thom Jurek wrote that while some tracks were decent, Prince Rama was "so involved with their campy concept, they neglected to write and record music capable of carrying its weight." Spectrum Culture critic Nathan Kamal analyzed the album did well in terms of songwriting and had a very ambitious concept but failed in terms of execution: "As well done as some of the songs on Top Ten Hits of the End of the World are, they all share so much of Prince Rama’s own sensibility that it’s difficult to take them seriously as the supposed creations of fictional bands."

Some reviewers disliked how Top 10 Hits of the End of the World didn't reflect the varied amount of genres marketed in its press release. An article in The Guardian stated the album was just "10 variations on a theme" of an "average" indie style, not following the genres of "ghost-modern glam" and "cosmic disco" as promised by the press release. A reviewer for No Ripcord praised Top 10 Hits of the End of the World for being more "focused" and having more "serious hooks" with "restless intensity" than past Prince Rama albums. No Ripcord analyzed that, despite following an apocalypse-based idea, the LP only had very few parts which were apocalypse-like and was nothing "more than a passable yet not entirely memorable collection of gauzy bedroom pop songs that barely separate themselves from the countless other acts following in the footsteps of more innovative predecessors like Ariel Pink and John Maus."

Another criticism prominent in numerous reviews was Prince Rama departing from the style and sound that defined them in their previous records. Mark Shukla of magazine The Skinny wrote that, while the concept of the LP was "clever enough," Prince Rama musically departed from the "fascinating" sound of their past records for a "low-rent Gang Gang Dance" style that consists of too many "bare-bones synth/guitar jams." Kivel wrote that the concept of Top 10 Hits of the End of the World was invalidated by the fact that it "sees a band with a highly stylized identity sitting inside of another band with a highly stylized identity" and that "more often than not, these halves clash, one entirely overpowering the other."

However, Top 10 Hits of the End of the World still garnered a fair amount of favorable reviews. Some of them noted how the concept influenced the quality of the music, some found it superior to Prince Rama's best albums, and others praised the visual aspect of the LP's physical release. Jonathan Donaldso of The Phoenix wrote that listeners can have a ton of enjoyment listening to the album without knowing its concept. A reviewer for Impose magazine described the album as "a polemic on the flagging state of culture and its lack of meaning in spirit and heart" and praised it as "at times meditative, often high-energy, and with an excellent through-line that rarely leaves the listener disengaged or disappointed." Rookie magazine's Eleanor Hardwick called it one of the best albums of 2012.

== Track listing ==
Adapted from the liner notes of Top 10 Hits of the End of the World.

No.	Title	Fictional artist	Length
1.	"Blade of Austerity"	Guns of Dubai	3:40
2.	"Those Who Live For Love Will Live Forever"	I.M.M.O.R.T.A.L.I.F.E.	5:04
3.	"No Way Back"	Nu Fighters	3:18
4.	"So Destroyed"	Rage Peace	2:34
5.	"Receive"	Taohaus	4:49
6.	"Radhamadhava"	Goloka	3:30
7.	"Fire Sacrifice"	Black Elk Speaks	3:38
8.	"Welcome To The Now Age"	Hyparxia	3:34
9.	"Exercise Ecstasy"	The Metaphysixxx	4:28
10.	"We Will Fall In Love Again"	Motel Memory	4:46
Total length:			39:21

== Personnel ==
Credits adapted from the press release by Paw Tracks and the liner notes of Top 10 Hits of the End of the World.

- Written, performed and recorded by Taraka Larson
- Performed by Nimai Larson
- Recorded by Tim Koh at "Ariel Pink’s Haunted Graffiti’s studio"
- Recorded, mixed and produced by Scott Colburn at Gravelvoice Studios in Seattle, Washington
- Artwork by Jo Cutri
- Photography by Samantha Casolari

== Release history ==
Region	Date	Format(s)	Label
Worldwide	November 6, 2012	CD; digital download; vinyl	Paw Tracks
