= Fatherland (album) =

2017 folk album by Kele Okereke

Studio album by Kele Okereke
- Released: 6 October 2017
- Genre: Folk
- Length: 45:01
- Label: BMG
- Producer: Justin Harris

Kele Okereke chronology
Trick (2014)	Fatherland (2017)	2042 (2019)

Singles from Fatherland
- 1. "Yemaya" Released: 28 April 2017; 2. "Streets Been Talkin'" Released: 6 July 2017; 3. "Grounds for Resentment" Released: 3 August 2017; 4. "Do U Right" Released: 1 September 2017

Fatherland is the third solo album by Bloc Party frontman Kele Okereke. The album was released on 6 October 2017 and was his first solo album released under his full name instead of the professional name of Kele. It also produced by the band's bassist Justin Harris.

== Background ==
The album was a departure from the alternative dance and electro house style of his previous two albums and instead opted for a folk sound inspired by Joni Mitchell, Nick Drake and Elliott Smith. The album focuses on Kele's experiences being a father despite being a gay man as well as reconnecting with his Nigerian heritage. The album features duets from Olly Alexander from synth-pop band Years & Years and Corinne Bailey Rae on the songs "Grounds for Resentment" and "Versions of Us." Kele embarked on his first solo acoustic tour in support of the album in May 2017 in which he played a mixture of the album, previous solo songs and acoustic renditions of Bloc Party songs.

== Critical reception ==
Professional ratings
Aggregate scores
Source	Rating
Metacritic	66/100
Review scores
Source	Rating
AllMusic	3.5/5 stars
Clash	7/10
DIY	3/5 stars
Drowned in Sound	7/10
The Observer	3/5 stars
Paste	5.6/10
Pitchfork	6.5/10

Fatherland received "generally favourable reviews" from critics; at Metacritic which assigns a normalised rating out of 100 to reviews from mainstream critics, the album received an average score of 66 based on 10 reviews. Critics praised Okereke's honest and personal lyrics as well as usage of "tenor sax, soft electric piano and clarinets." Neil Young from AllMusic described the album as "forlorn and delicate" and as remaining "mostly sullen and occasionally sharp in its content, but the instrumentation helps lift the songs from the gloom." He also praised Okereke's restraint and maturation as a songwriter. Leander Hobbs from The Line of Best Fit described the duets with Olly Alexander and Corinne Bailey Rae as showing "that Okereke understands how to add greater texture and contrast to his shaky vocals without resorting to the autotuned experiments of his early career." However, others were critical of the album, with The Observer describing "Okereke's shaky voice" as making the album "far slighter than it might have been." Paste magazine said it was a shame "that what lies behind dozens of layers of metaphorical shrouds, isn’t a bit more poetic and interesting."

== Track listing ==
No.	Title	Writer(s)	Length
1.	"Overture"	Okereke	0:45
2.	"Streets Been Talkin'"	Okereke	3:25
3.	"You Keep On Whispering His Name"	Okereke	4:09
4.	"Capers"	Okereke	3:51
5.	"Grounds for Resentment" (featuring Olly Alexander)	Okereke & Alexander	4:17
6.	"Yemaya"	Okereke	3:32
7.	"Do U Right"	Okereke	3:51
8.	"Versions of Us" (featuring Corinne Bailey Rae)	Okereke & Bailey Rae	4:13
9.	"Portrait"	Okereke	3:31
10.	"Road to Ibadan"	Okereke	3:23
11.	"Savannah"	Okereke	2:56
12.	"The New Year Party"	Okereke	3:11
13.	"Royal Reign"	Okereke	3:50
Total length:			45:01

== Personnel ==
Credits adapted from Discogs.

- Kele Okereke – lead vocals, lead guitar, songwriting

=== Additional musicians ===
- Olly Alexander – co-lead vocals and songwriting on "Grounds for Resentment"
- Corinne Bailey Rae – co-lead vocals and songwriting on "Versions of Us"
- Bruce Withycombe – brass
- Megan Diana McGeorge – brass
- Paul Brainard – brass
- Scott Van Schoick – brass
- Willie Matheis – brass
- Collette Alexander – cello
- Sean Flynn – guitar

=== Production ===
- Justin Harris – production
- Jeff Stuart Saltzman – mixing
- Nigel Walton – mastering

=== Design ===
- Kele Okereke – photography
- Rachael Wright – photography
- David Drake – photography, art direction, design, layout
