= Prince Rama =

Brooklyn-based now-age psych-dance band

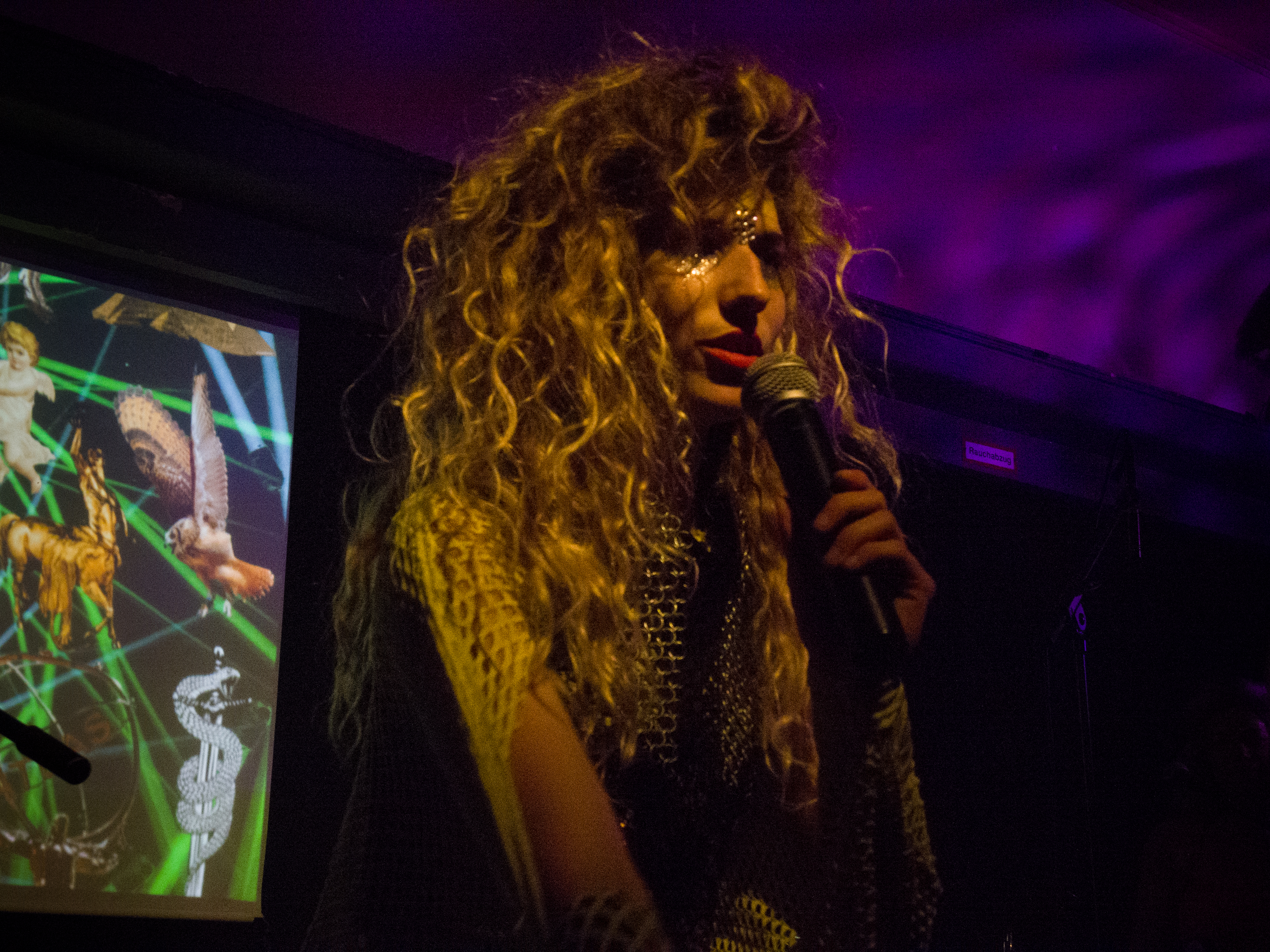

Background information
- Origin: Brooklyn, New York, United States
- Genres: Now age; dance-pop; electronic
- Years active: 2008–2019
- Labels: Carpark Records; Animal; Impose; Spooky Town; Paw Tracks; Not Not Fun
- Past members: Taraka Larson, Nimai Larson, Michael Collins, Ryan Sciaino
- Website: princerama.com

Prince Rama (previously Prince Rama of Ayodhya) was a two-piece "now age" psych-dance band based in Brooklyn, New York, founded by Michael Collins and sisters Taraka Larson and Nimai Larson. Discovered by Animal Collective's Avey Tare in 2010, the band signed to Paw Tracks shortly thereafter.

The band drew heavily on its members' experiences growing up in a Hare Krishna commune. Taraka published a manifesto on the "Now Age" that puts forth Prince Rama’s aesthetic and metaphysical philosophies.

Collins departed the band after the release of Shadow Temple. Trust Now was the band's first album without him. In 2016, Ryan Scianino began working with the band.

Shadow Temple and Trust Now peaked at #3 and #6 on the Billboard New Age Charts, respectively. On August 20, 2019, Taraka Larson announced that the band had disbanded. The band's final EP, Rage in Peace, was assembled by Taraka Larson from a variety of unfinished session material.

== Band members ==
- Taraka Larson: lead vocals, electric guitar, acoustic guitar, synthesizer, keyboard (2008–2019)
- Nimai Larson: drums, drum machine, percussion, vocals (2008–2019)
- Michael Collins: synthesizer (2008–2010)
- Ryan Sciaino: guitar, synthesizer (2016–2019)

== Education ==
Taraka graduated from the School of the Museum of Fine Arts in Boston, MA in 2009 and Nimai studied Visual Art and Art History at St. Edwards University in Austin, Texas.

== Discography ==
- 2008 - Threshold Dances (Cosmos Records, UK)
- 2009 - Zetland (Self-Released)
- 2010 - Architecture Of Utopia (Animal Image Search)
- 2010 - Shadow Temple (Paw Tracks)
- 2011 - Trust Now (Paw Tracks)
- 2012 - Utopia = No Person (Not Not Fun)
- 2012 - Top 10 Hits of the End of the World (Paw Tracks)
- 2016 - Xtreme Now (Carpark Records)
- 2019 - Rage in Peace (Carpark Records)
