= Kele Okereke =

English singer and guitarist (born 1981)

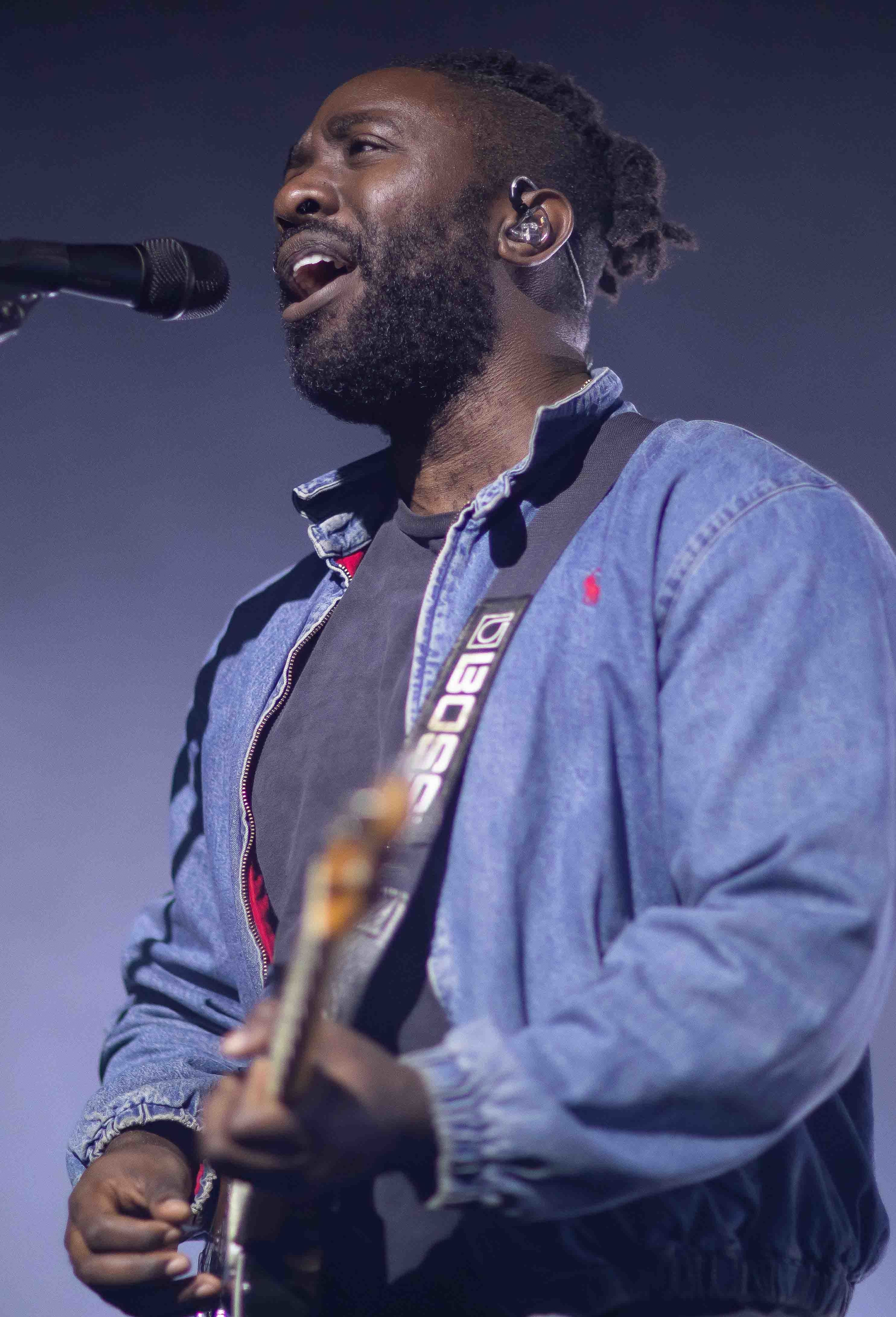
- Okereke performing in November 2018

Background information
- Born: Rowland Kelechukwu Okereke; 13 October 1981 (age 44); Liverpool, England
- Origin: London, England
- Genres: Indie rock; post-punk revival; post-Britpop; art punk; alternative rock; alternative dance; house
- Occupations: Singer; songwriter; musician
- Instruments: Vocals; guitar; piano; vocoder
- Years active: 1999–present
- Labels: Wichita; V2; Kobalt; A Remarkable Idea
- Member of: Bloc Party

Rowland Kelechukwu Okereke (born 13 October 1981), also known mononymously as Kele, is an English singer, songwriter, and musician. He is best known as the lead singer and rhythm guitarist of the indie rock band Bloc Party. Additionally, he has released six studio albums as a solo artist.

== Early life ==
Okereke was born in Liverpool on 13 October 1981, the son of Nigerian immigrant parents. He is of Igbo descent and was raised Catholic in Edinburgh and London. In his teenage years in London, he attended Trinity Catholic High School, Woodford Green. From 2001 to 2003, he studied English literature at King's College London.

== Music career ==
=== Bloc Party ===
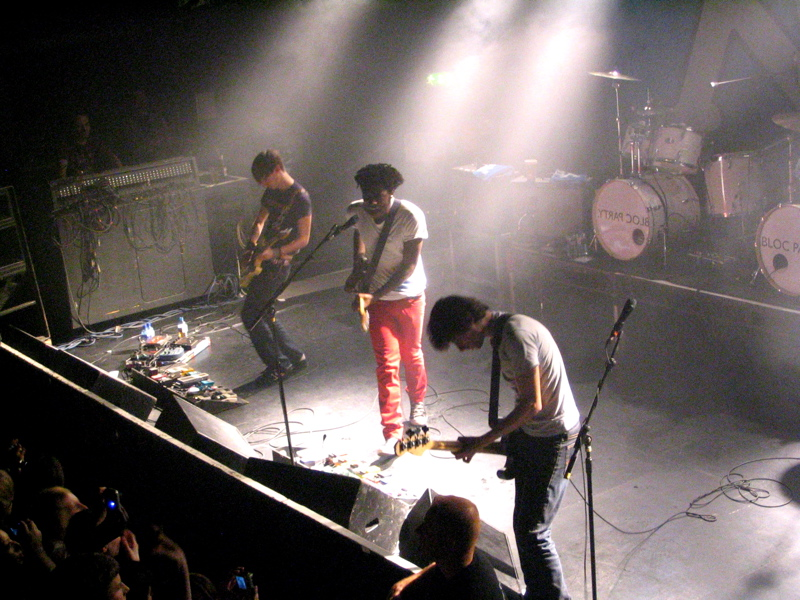
Bloc Party performing in January 2006

Okereke knew fellow East London guitarist Russell Lissack through friends, and the pair established Bloc Party in 1999 at the Reading Festival. Bass player Gordon Moakes answered an advertisement placed in the New Musical Express in 2000, and in 2003 Matt Tong became the band's drummer after eight others had held the role. Okereke did not reveal to his parents that he was a musician until Bloc Party were signed; he then quit university.

Bloc Party's debut album, Silent Alarm, charted at number 3 on the UK Album Charts, and its fast pace was likened to post-punk band Gang of Four, a band that Okereke said he had never heard of. Okereke reflected in 2007 that the album's lyrics were too abstract, and that he had been inspired by the Smiths to write more direct lyrics.

The band released their second album A Weekend in the City in February 2007, peaking at No. 12 on the Billboard 200 in the United States and No. 2 in the UK Albums Chart. For the album, Okereke chose more personal and political subjects for songs. A family friend, Christopher Alaneme, had been murdered in a racist attack, while London bartender David Morley was beaten to death in a possibly homophobic "happy slapping" incident. Okereke said that these events, combined with the 7 July London bombings, "galvanised [his] mindset" and prompted him to make the lyrics "dark, bigger and quite abrasive". The song "SRXT" was named after the antidepressant seroxat and inspired by two of Okereke's university friends attempting suicide. The first single, "The Prayer", reached No. 4 on the UK Singles Chart, still the group's highest placing. The next single, "I Still Remember," was the album's first in the US.

Okereke responded critically to comments made by Liam and Noel Gallagher of Oasis in early 2007. Liam called Bloc Party "a band off of University Challenge" while Noel dismissed them as "indie shit". Okereke replied by calling Oasis "the most overrated and pernicious band of all time" and that "They have made stupidity hip". He opined that despite Oasis' love of the Beatles, they did not evolve like their heroes and were "repetitive Luddites". When Oasis cancelled their headlining set at the Rock en Seine festival in August 2009 and eventually broke up, Okereke broke the news to the crowd and referred to the Gallaghers as "those inbred twins".

The third album released by the band, Intimacy, was initially only made available for purchase on their website as a download on 21 August 2008. The record was released in compact disc form on 24 October 2008, with Wichita Recordings as the primary label. It peaked at number 8 on the UK Albums Chart and entered the Billboard 200 in the United States at number 18.

Okereke made a guest appearance on Tiësto's song "It's Not the Things You Say" on his album Kaleidoscope, released 6 October 2009 and also Martin Solveig's 'Ready 2 Go', after which Bloc Party went on hiatus.

In 2011, Kele reunited with Bloc Party to record the band's fourth album, Four, which was released in August 2012. The album peaked in the UK charts at number three.

In 2013, the band released an EP called The Nextwave Sessions and went on an indefinite hiatus.

Bloc Party reunited in 2015 with a new line-up. They released their fifth album Hymns on 29 January 2016.

=== Solo career ===
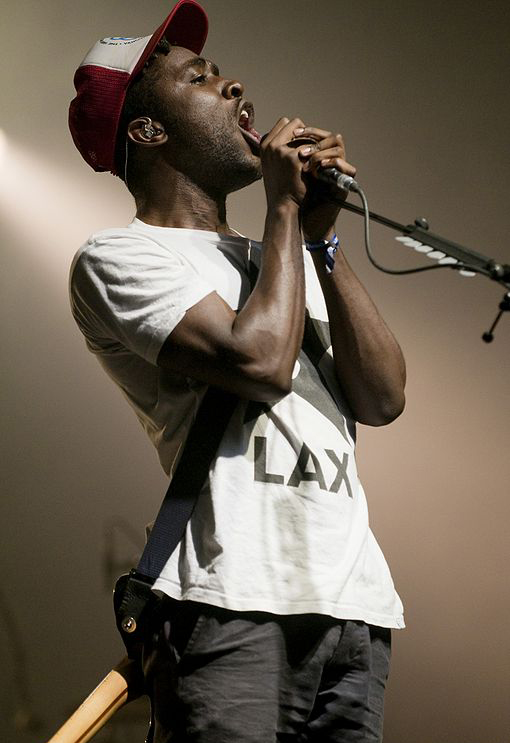
Okereke performing in 2009

Okereke released his first solo album, titled The Boxer, produced by XXXChange, on 21 June 2010, through Wichita / Polydor in the UK and Europe and Glassnote Records for the rest of the world. The album was released under the name Kele, dropping his surname. Okereke explained the album title, saying "as a boxer, you have to rely on nobody else but yourself to achieve what it is you want to achieve. Even though you take hits, you have to keep focus on your priorities and keep going. I thought that was an inspiring image." The first single from the album, "Tenderoni", was released on 14 June 2010.

On 13 September 2011, NME and Wichita Recordings announced that Kele would be releasing a follow-up to The Boxer; an EP titled The Hunter.

Kele released the single "Everything You Wanted". It was remixed by South African producers DJ Qness and DJ Mujava, who brought in a fusion of pop along with their traditional South African Kwaito music.

Kele features on Sub Focus' single "Turn It Around" from his second studio album Torus. The song was released on 22 September 2013.

On 23 July 2014, Kele announced his second solo album, entitled Trick, to be released on his own label Lilac Records via Kobalt Label Services on 13 October 2014.

Okereke released his third album Fatherland on 6 October 2017 under his full name (whereas his first two albums were released under the mononym 'Kele'). Two tracks, "Yemaya" and "Streets Been Talkin'", have been released from the album as of July 2017.

On 19 March 2018, the Bloc Party Facebook page put a picture up indicating they were doing a tour of six shows in Europe performing songs from their first album, Silent Alarm.

In January 2019, "Leave to Remain", a new musical written by Okereke and Matt Jones debuted in London. Announced in September 2018, the musical about an interracial gay couple was preceded by the single "Not the Drugs Talking" which showed a move back towards beats following the more acoustic Fatherland. Telling a love story through the Prism of Brexit, the new show is accompanied by a tie-in album of new songs. Speaking about the subject matter and his feelings on the UK in 2019, Okereke claimed that "It's not a time that I've been proud to be British. It's an ugly time. The opportunity to tell a story about people from different cultures coming together and finding love in the shadow of that is an important thing to stand up for."

In November 2019, saw the release of Kele's fourth album, 2042. The title is a reference to the year that census data predicts ethnic minorities will become the majority in the United States. Much of the album tackles political themes such as the Windrush scandal, Grenfell Tower fire and Colin Kaepernick's national anthem protest. Musically, Kele fuses funk with experimental electro, glitchy guitars and West African beats, according to NME. The album was released under the name Kele, again dropping his surname.

In May 2021, Okereke released his fifth studio album entitled The Waves Pt. 1. In March 2023, Okereke released his sixth studio album following on from The Waves entitled The Flames Pt. 2.

== Personal life ==
In the early years of Bloc Party's fame, Okereke was often uncomfortable with media interviews that focused on his position as a black man in British rock music, and speculation about his sexuality when he was still closeted. Okereke wrote in 2011 that he felt a subtext in interviews mentioning his race, namely that he was being told that British rock music was not for black people. In 2007, Okereke contrasted his introverted personality with the more stereotypical rock singer bravado of his contemporaries Tom Meighan of Kasabian and Johnny Borrell of Razorlight, saying "they're gonna be a footnote in history in 10 years' time. There's no battle in them. There's no conflict".

In October 2008, Okereke moved to Berlin to seize the city's music orientated spirit. He then moved to New York City until 2011, and said that the experience made him "radicalised as a black man" as he noted segregation in the United States; he said that the situation was better in the UK as his music was appreciated by largely white audiences.

In March 2010, Okereke came out as gay in a BUTT magazine article. He then gave an interview and appeared on the June 2010 cover of Attitude magazine. He had previously been reluctant to discuss his sexuality, though he had compared himself to bisexual musicians Brian Molko and David Bowie. Additionally, he has discussed the homoerotic story behind the Bloc Party song "I Still Remember" and its semi-autobiographical nature. In June 2010, he was named as the "Sexiest Out Gay Male Artist" by music website LP33 in its annual survey.

Since at least 2010, Okereke's personal website has been at iamkele.com.

In 2017, Okereke and his boyfriend of seven years became the father of a daughter via surrogacy in the United States. Around the same time, he left Shoreditch in East London for a new home south of the Thames, as "I was fed up with the grey and people vomiting in the streets. I wanted some green and some anonymity, to insulate myself from that world".

Okereke endorsed Labour's Jeremy Corbyn in a 2017 webchat with The Guardian. In 2022, Okereke gave his opinion that apart from some artists such as Slowthai, Idles and Billy Bragg, few were standing up to racism in the United Kingdom. When Brandon Flowers of the Killers praised Morrissey's music after being asked about the latter singer's racially charged comments, Okereke responded by saying "It does matter. It absolutely matters what people say and the fact that no one is willing to challenge [Flowers] on this to me is quite disgusting. Shame on [Flowers] and shame on Morrissey".

Kele's first cousin is the hip-hop artist Tobe Nwigwe; their mothers are sisters.

== Awards and nominations ==
Award	Year	Nominee(s)	Category	Result	Ref.
Ivor Novello Awards	2025	Bloc Party	Outstanding Song Collection	Won	
MTV Europe Music Awards	2005	Bloc Party	Best Alternative	Nominated	
MTV Europe Music Awards	2005	"Believe" (with The Chemical Brothers)	Best Video	Won	
mtvU Woodie Awards	2005	Bloc Party	International Woodie	Nominated	
mtvU Woodie Awards	2012	"Ready 2 Go" (with Martin Solveig)	EDM Effect Woodie	Nominated	
UK Festival Awards	2008	Bloc Party	Festival Rock Act	Nominated	
UK Festival Awards	2012	"Octopus"	Anthem of the Summer	Nominated	
Virgin Media Music Awards	2007	Bloc Party	Best UK Act	Nominated	
Virgin Media Music Awards	2008	Intimacy	Best Album Cover	Nominated	

== Discography ==
=== Solo albums ===
List of studio albums, with selected chart positions
Title	Album details	Peak chart positions									
Title	Album details	UK	AUS	AUT	BEL (FL)	BEL (WA)	FRA	GER	IRL	SCO	SWI
The Boxer	Released: 21 June 2010; Label: Wichita	20	35	71	41	89	174	67	42	31	98
Trick	Released: 13 October 2014; Label: Lilac	99	92	—	—	—	—	—	—	—	—
Fatherland (as Kele Okereke)	Released: 6 October 2017; Label: BMG	— (Note: Fatherland did not enter the UK Albums Chart, but peaked at number 30 on the UK Record Store Chart.)	—	—	—	—	—	—	—	—	—
2042	Released: 8 November 2019; Label: Kola	—	—	—	—	—	—	—	—	—	—
The Waves Pt. 1	Released: 28 May 2021; Label: Kola	—	—	—	—	—	—	—	—	—	—
The Flames Pt. 2	Released: 24 March 2023; Label: Kola	—	—	—	—	—	—	—	—	—	—
The Singing Winds Pt. 3	Released: 16 January 2025; Label: Kola	—	—	—	—	—	—	—	—	—	—
"—" denotes a recording that did not chart or was not released in that territory.

==== Soundtrack albums ====
Title	Details
Leave to Remain	Released: 25 January 2019

==== EPs ====
List of EPs, with selected chart positions
Title	EP details	Peak chart positions
Title	EP details	AUS
The Hunter	Released: 7 November 2011; Label: Wichita Recordings	79
Heartbreaker	Released: 25 November 2013; Label: Crosstown Rebels	—
Candy Flip	Released: 31 March 2014; Label: Crosstown Rebels	—
"—" denotes a recording that did not chart or was not released in that territory.

=== Singles ===
==== As lead artist ====
List of singles as lead artist, with selected chart positions, showing year released and album name
Title	Year	Peak chart positions							Album
Title	Year	UK	UK Dance	AUS	AUT	BEL (FL)	BEL (WA)	SCO	Album
"Tenderoni"	2010	31	6	63	58	54	64	32	The Boxer
"Everything You Wanted"	2010	93	17	—	—	79	—	—	The Boxer
"On the Lam"	2010	—	—	—	—	—	—	—	The Boxer
"What Did I Do?" (Kele featuring Lucy Taylor)	2011	—	—	83	—	56	—	—	The Hunter
"Doubt"	2014	—	—	—	—	—	—	—	Trick
"Coasting"	2014	—	—	—	—	—	—	—	Trick
"Closer"	2014	—	—	—	—	—	—	—	Trick
"—" denotes a recording that did not chart or was not released in that territory.

==== As featured artist ====
List of singles as featured artist, with selected chart positions, showing year released and album name
Title	Year	Peak chart positions										Album
Title	Year	UK	UK Dance	AUT	BEL (FL)	BEL (WA)	FRA	GER	IRL	SCO	SWI	Album
"Ready 2 Go" (Martin Solveig featuring Kele)	2011	48	13	49	65	41	20	45	38	41	70	Smash
"Turn It Around" (Sub Focus featuring Kele)	2013	14	5	—	—	—	—	—	—	14	—	Torus
"Let Go" (RAC featuring Kele)	2014	—	—	—	—	—	—	—	—	—	—	Strangers
"Faith" (V V Brown featuring Kele)	2014	—	—	—	—	—	—	—	—	—	—	Samson & Delilah
"—" denotes a recording that did not chart or was not released in that territory.

=== Featured singles ===
- "Believe" with The Chemical Brothers (2005)
- "It's Not The Things You Say" with Tiësto (2009)
- "Ready 2 Go" with Martin Solveig (2011)
- "Step Up" with Hercules & Love Affair (2011)
- "What Did I Do?" with Sander van Doorn featuring Lucy Taylor (2011)
- "Turn It Around" with Sub Focus (2013)
- "Let Go" with RAC (2013)
- "Faith" with V V Brown (2014)
- "The One" with Sable (2014)
- "So They Say" with Claptone (2018)
- "Won't Give Up" with Ejeca (2020)

=== with Bloc Party ===
- Silent Alarm (2005)
- A Weekend in the City (2007)
- Intimacy (2008)
- Four (2012)
- Hymns (2016)
- Alpha Games (2022)
