= Intimacy Remixed =

Remix album by Bloc Party
- Released: 11 May 2009
- Recorded: 2008–2009
- Genres: Alternative dance, electro house
- Length: 65:15
- Label: Wichita
- Producers: Paul Epworth, Jacknife Lee, various artists

Bloc Party chronology
Intimacy (2008)	Intimacy Remixed (2009)	Four (2012)

Singles from Intimacy Remixed
- 1. "Signs (Armand Van Helden Remix)" Released: 27 April 2009

Intimacy Remixed is the remix album to Intimacy, the third album by indie rock band Bloc Party. It was released on 11 May 2009 in the United Kingdom through Wichita Recordings, the band's primary label, in limited edition CD and triple LP formats to coincide with Bloc Party's worldwide touring schedule. The record entered the UK Album Chart at number 79. In the United States, it achieved a peak of number 15 on the Billboard Dance/Electronic Albums chart.

The band members gave each of the original tracks, including those on the deluxe edition of Intimacy, to a number of musicians from different genres; Mogwai, Filthy Dukes, and No Age were amongst those who reworked the songs. "Signs (Armand Van Helden Remix)" was released as a single and a music video was also made for "Ares (Villains Remix)". Critics often considered the record as a poor showcase for electronic music, although a minority of reviewers commented that it was a forward-thinking piece of work.

== Release ==
Intimacy Remixed is the second remix album of Bloc Party's work following Silent Alarm Remixed, the remix album to debut full-length release Silent Alarm. Details of the record and its track listing were confirmed on 16 March 2009 after the band's European tour in support of Intimacy. Several dance acts, DJs, and alternative music groups were asked to rework tracks. Mogwai, whose debut album Mogwai Young Team is frontman Kele Okereke's musical "Year Zero", were drafted in to remix "Biko". "Talons (Phones R.I.P Remix)" is Intimacy co-producer Paul Epworth's last song remix under the "Phones" name. Pitchfork Media's reaction to the release news was mixed; Tom Breihan indicated that the concept could be successful, but noted that the idea of remix albums in rock music has become stagnant.

Bloc Party spent much of March and April 2009 touring in the US and Canada in support of Intimacy Remixed. The band members invited fans attending their one-off London Olympia concerts on 11–12 April to film the performances on their mobiles and send the recordings to the band online. A music video for "Ares (Villains Remix)" was created by collating the resulting footage and was webcast. "Signs (Armand Van Helden Remix)" was released as a promotional single on 27 April 2009. Intimacy Remixed was released in Europe on 11 May 2009. The album was distributed in the rest of the world on 26–27 May but no physical copies were released on US record labels. The cover art is a negative of the close-up of a couple kissing by freelance photographer Perry Curties used on Intimacy.

== Critical reception ==
Professional ratings
Aggregate scores
Source	Rating
AnyDecentMusic?	2.9/10
Review scores
Source	Rating
Drowned in Sound	2/10
The Irish Times	2/5 stars
NME	3/10
Planet Sound	5/10
PopMatters	3/10
Pitchfork Media	3.2/10
Rockfeedback	2/5 stars
This Is Fake DIY	4/10

Media response to Intimacy Remixed was generally negative: AnyDecentMusic? sums up critical consensus as a 2.9 out of 10, based on five reviews, making it one of the lowest-rated albums on the site. Emily Tartanella of PopMatters explained that the remixers' efforts ultimately make Bloc Party's work "less engaging, less meaningful". Ben Patashnik of NME stated that the album is largely monotonous and includes too many pedestrian experiments in dance music. Drowned in Sound's Chris Power indicated that "in putting their names to the album Bloc Party seem to be saying they either don't care about what they ask fans to spend their money on or they don't know much about electronic music".

BBC's Lou Thomas was more receptive and commented that Intimacy Remixed is unprecedented in its field and entirely better than Intimacy. James Hendicott of State.ie described the album as "something special" that should appeal to both Bloc Party fans and dance music lovers due to its "highly listenable, subtly energetic sound". Pitchfork Media's Ian Cohen was largely disappointed with the record and concluded, "Remix albums all but acknowledge their own inessentiality—why not take more chances when only the diehards are going to subject themselves to 60 minutes of someone else's idea of what Intimacy could sound like?"

== Composition ==
Electronic music duo Villains reworked "Ares" by replacing the big beat percussion of the original with electronic drums and synthesisers. The result was compared to the music of French band Justice by Lou Thomas of the BBC. British DJ Hervé's mix of Mercury" removes the horns of the original and instead includes keyboards in an electro house-like composition. We Have Band's version of "Halo" is the only dub song on the Intimacy Remixed and incorporates a modulating synth line on top of cut-up vocals. Alex Hibbert of Rockfeedback noted its "euphoric" percussion. Scottish post-rockers Mogwai infused Bloc Party's blueprint in "Biko" with electronica elements.

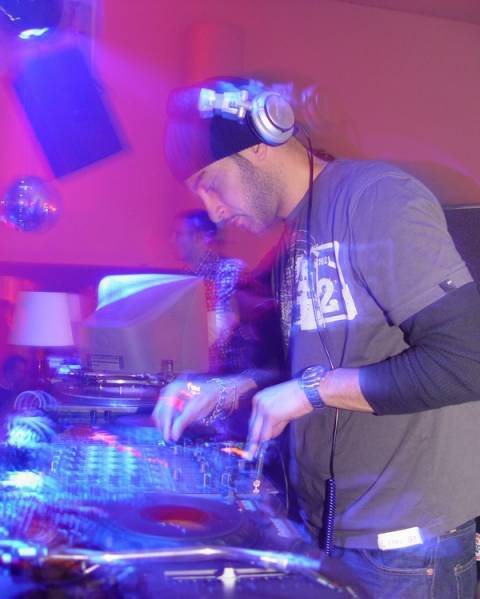
Armand Van Helden added trance elements and extensive studio effects to "Signs".

"Trojan Horse" was given a drum and bass reworking by English DJ John B, while another U.S. DJ, Armand Van Helden, remixed "Signs" through the inclusion of trance beats and studio effects such as high-pass filters. Synthpop group Filthy Dukes took charge of "One Month Off" and created an electro house version of the track according to Chris Power of Drowned in Sound. Paul Epworth's "Talons (Phones R.I.P Remix)" contains samples from "You Don't Know Nothing About Love" by Carl Hall and the use of a vocoder. "Better Than Heaven" was remixed by American noise pop duo No Age and begins with a rhythmic pattern on the piano. The song features feedback, distorted drumming, and backmasked vocals.

London-based Italian solo act Alessio Andalusia, under his Banjo or Freakout alias, provided the remix for "Ion Square" and created an ambient version of the original. The track infuses Bloc Party's blueprint with keyboards, looped strings, and ethereal vocals. Power concluded, "By taking the percolating synth from the end of the original version and wrapping the sweet E. E. Cummings-borrowed lyric—"I carry your heart here with me"—in a dense cloud of treated, looped guitar, he produces a remix that ... offers an interesting, possibly even superior, reading of its source material." Album closer "Your Visits Are Getting Shorter (Optothetic Remix)" was named as a "generic commercial dance music" song by Lee White of This Is Fake DIY.

== Track listing ==
All songs originally written and composed by Bloc Party and remixed by each credited artist.

No.	Title	Length
1.	"Ares" (Villains Remix)	5:31
2.	"Mercury" (Hervé Is in Disarray Remix)	4:49
3.	"Halo" (We Have Band Dub)	4:34
4.	"Biko" (Mogwai Remix)	4:24
5.	"Trojan Horse" (John B Remix)	6:53
6.	"Signs" (Armand Van Helden Remix)	5:47
7.	"One Month Off" (Filthy Dukes Remix)	5:47
8.	"Zephyrus" (Phase One Remix)	4:10
9.	"Talons" (Phones R.I.P Mix)	5:16
10.	"Better Than Heaven" (No Age Remix)	3:01
11.	"Ion Square" (Banjo or Freakout Remix)	4:24
12.	"Letter to My Son" (Gold Panda Remix)	5:33
13.	"Your Visits Are Getting Shorter" (Optothetic Remix)	5:06

- The limited edition UK triple LP version and the Japanese edition include "Your Visits Are Getting Shorter" (Double D Remix) is listed as Optothetic Remix.

Bonus tracks on the Japanese edition

14. "Talons" (Acoustic) – 4:32
15. "Signs" (Acoustic) – 3:24

== Release history ==
Region	Date	Label	Format(s)	Catalog
United Kingdom	11 May 2009	Polydor	Limited edition LP	3621210
United Kingdom	11 May 2009	Wichita Recordings	Limited edition CD, digital download	WEBB210
Europe	11 May 2009	Wichita Recordings	CD	WEBB210
United States	26 May 2009	Atlantic Records	Digital download	—
Japan	27 May 2009	Hostess	CD	HSE-70062

== Chart positions ==
Album

Chart (2009)	Peak
UK Albums Chart	79
Billboard 200 (US)	—
Billboard Dance/Electronic Albums (US)	15
Belgian Albums Chart (Flanders)	71
Japanese Albums Chart	—

Singles

Song	Peak
Song	UK
"Signs (Armand Van Helden Remix)"	115

"—" denotes releases that did not chart.
