= Plastic Little (band) =

American hip hop group

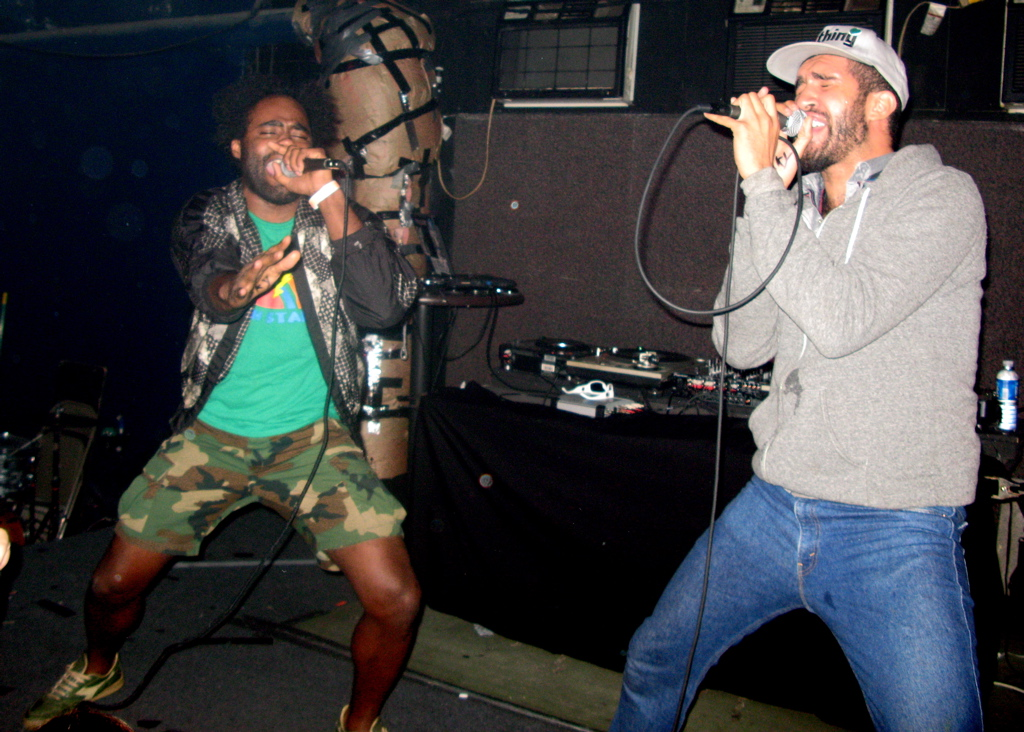
- Kurt Hunte and Jayson Musson (from left) performing at Sonar, Baltimore, September 12, 2007

Background information
- Origin: Philadelphia, Pennsylvania, United States
- Genres: Hip hop; 2-step
- Labels: aNYthing; SoundInk; Free News Projects
- Members: PackofRats; No Body's Child; Jon Thousand; DJ Si Young; Squid
- Past members: MC Spank Rock
- Website: Plastic Little on Myspace

Plastic Little is an American rap group consisting of Jayson Musson (PackofRats), Kurt Hunte (No Body's Child), Jon Folmar (Jon Thousand), Si Young Lee (DJ Si Young) and Michael Stern (SQUID). The name "Plastic Little" comes from the manga and OVA Plastic Little simply as, according to Musson, "The way the 2 words go together, I like it". Based in Philadelphia, Pennsylvania; they've worked with other notable artists from the area, including Amanda Blank and Spank Rock.

== Background ==
Originally consisting of only Musson and Hunte, Plastic Little formed during the summer of 2001. After little success the pair started looking for "some proper white folks" to appeal to a wider audience. In late 2002, producer Michael Squid joined the group and together they completed their self-released album Thug Paradise 2.1, released in 2003. A few years later, DJ and producer Si Young joined the group as the group's DJ.

Subsequent to its release the first 6 tracks were released by 'aNYthing Records', for which it received wide critical acclaim from a variety of sources such as Pitchfork Media and Vice Magazine.

Following up on this success, Plastic Little released their first studio album, She's Mature, in 2006 to mixed reviews.

Subsequent to the release of this album the band spent much of the next following years touring both the United States and the UK, both playing shows of their own and also in a supporting role for various artists. The group has shared the stage with M.I.A., Diplo, Blockhead, Mark Ronson, Jay-Z, Bonde Do Role, Roots Manuva, Z-Trip, Belleruche, Dizzie Rascal, Santogold and Chromeo as well as Philadelphia's own Need New Body and Man Man.

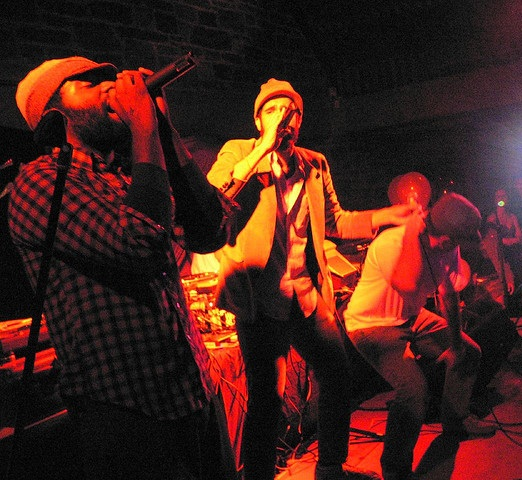
The group perform a 2005 Halloween show at Haverford College, PA.

Plastic Little released their second album Welcome to the Jang House in 2008 to the UK audience only. The album compiles tracks from their self-released album, Thug Paradise, as well as their debut album, She's Mature; adding a couple of new tracks also. The album received mainly positive reviews, with critics praising Little's ability to blend many genres together into one album while still sounding "fresh and bold"; their "tongue-in-cheek brilliance"; and their "biting critique of society at large" and "acerbic wit and intelligence".

2008 also saw them touring the UK in support of their album and featuring in a number of festivals; including Glastonbury (for Mark Ronson), Creamfields, Get Loaded in The Park (for Ronson), Lollapalooza and the O2 Wireless festival (again for Ronson).

=== Harlem Shake ===
A sample of the song "Miller Time", from the self-released 2003 album Thug Paradise 2.1, was featured in the Baauer song "Harlem Shake" in 2012. The sample was used without the permission of the band, who then sought compensation from Mad Decent records for the copyright infringement, along with reggaeton artist Héctor Delgado, due to the success of the release. Musson stated the label were "more than cooperative during this". "Harlem Shake" became an internet meme in February 2013 after various groups of people performed a dance (unrelated to the original Harlem shake) to it and uploaded the videos to YouTube. The original lyrics ("And if you bring a 40 bottle to battle me/ I'll just punch you in the face/ then do the Harlem Shake") were a reference to a fight Musson had with a local graffiti artist after a Plastic Little gig.

== Musical style ==
Their music has been variously described as rap, hip-hop, 2-step, Gallery Rap and, in their own words, Broke Pop and Party Rap. Plastic Little are known for their often tongue-in-cheek, comedic lyrical style while still being "simultaneously too full of themselves and astoundingly self-aware".

== Influences ==
Plastic Little list a wide range of artists as their influences, including The Roots, Yellowman, Three 6 Mafia, Bonnie Raitt, Dwight Yoakam, Sade, R. Kelly and even Disney.

== Discography ==
=== Albums ===
- Thug Paradise 2.1 (self-released, 2003)
- She's Mature (2006)
- Welcome to the Jang House (2008)

=== EPs ===
- Thug Paradise (2005)

=== Singles ===
- "F.O.I.L. (I Rock)" (2004)
- "Crambodia" (2006)
- "The Jump Off" (2006)
- "I'm Not a Thug" (2007)
- "Get Close" with sample from The Cure's song "Close to Me" (2008)
- "La La Land" (2009)

=== Appearances and remixes ===
- 2007 Dub Pistols – "Open" (Plastic Little Remix)
- 2007 Just Jack – "Writer's Block" (Plastic Little Remix)
- 2007 Leon Jean Marie – "Bed of Nails" (Plastic Little Remix)
- 2008 Ministry of Sound – The Annual 2009
  - Hervé - "Cheap Thrills" (Vocal Club Mix)
- 2008 Daniel Merriweather – "Chainsaw" (Plastic Little Remix)
- 2008 Filthy Dukes – Nonsense in the Dark
  - Filthy Dukes - "Tupac Robot Club Rock" (Feat. Plastic Little)
- 2008 The Clik Clik – "Did You Wrong" (Plastic Little Remix)
- 2009 Eliza Doolittle - "Rollerblades" (Plastic Little Remix Vocal)
- 2009 Eliza Doolittle – "Rollerblades" (Plastic Little Remix Dub)
- 2009 Jahcoozi – "Watching You" (Plastic Little Remix)
- 2011 Missill – Kawaii
  - Missill – "Raw Dog" (Feat. Plastic Little)
  - Missil – "Bemore" (Feat. Deeon, Plastic Little)
