= Anthony Dawson (disambiguation) =

Anthony Dawson (1916–1992) was a Scottish actor.

Anthony Dawson may also refer to:

- Anthony M. Dawson (1930–2002), pseudonymous Italian filmmaker, real name Antonio Margheriti
- Anthony Dawson (equestrian), represented South Africa at the 2012 Summer Paralympics
- Anthony Dawson (physician) (1928–1997), British gastroenterologist
- Andy Archer (radio presenter) (born 1946), British radio presenter, born Anthony Dawson
- TooTurntTony (born 1995) American social media star, born Anthony Dawson

== See also ==
- Tony Dawson (disambiguation)
