= Mauro Remiddi =

Italian composer

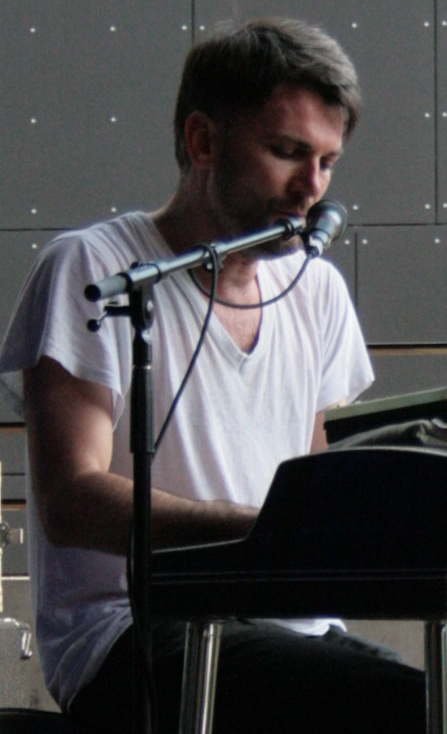
Porcelain Raft

Porcelain Raft or Mauro Remiddi (born 1972 in Rome, Italy) is a composer/song writer/musician. He currently lives in New York City. He is currently best known for his alternative rock project Porcelain Raft.

== Career ==
In 1997 he composed the music for the short film 'La Matta dei Fiori' which won the prize David di Donatello for best short film. In 1999 he played his own composition at La Mama Theatre in New York as part of the tap dance show 'Vaudeville 2000'. After moving to UK he started a long term collaboration with video artist Ra Di Martino, composing and appearing in three of Di Martino's videos ('Not 360', 'Night Walker' and 'August 2008'). In 2003, under the name Three Blind Mice, artist/musician Onyee Lo and Mauro Remiddi started to play together as a duo, in 2005 they formed Sunny Day Sets Fire. In 2008 he collaborated with Filthy Dukes, singing on the track "Somewhere at Sea" for their debut album Nonsense in the Dark. His first Porcelain Raft EP, Gone Blind, was released on Acephale in 2010. Porcelain Raft's debut full-length, Strange Weekend, was released on Secretly Canadian in January 2012.

== References and External links ==
- Sunny Day Sets Fire
- SDSF interview
- SDSF album review
- Filthy Dukes album review
