= Porcelain Raft =

- Also known as: Mauro Remiddi
- Born: 1972; Rome, Italy
- Genres: Alternative rock, indie pop, indie rock
- Instruments: vocals, guitar, sampler, loops, keyboard
- Years active: 2010-present
- Labels: Secretly Canadian; Acéphale Records; Volcanic Field

Porcelain Raft is Mauro Remiddi's main music project. The New York-based musician began his long, prolific career in Italy, the place of his birth, playing for small, local projects. After composing the original soundtrack for the 1997 Italian short-film La Matta dei Fiori, and collaborating and touring the world with various bands, Remiddi launched his first solo recording project under the moniker Porcelain Raft, and in 2010 released his first solo EP Gone Blind with Acéphale Records. In 2011 he signed with Secretly Canadian and released the debut Porcelain Raft full-length record Strange Weekend which peaked at #33 on the Billboard Top Heatseekers Albums chart. Permanent Signal, Porcelain Raft's second album was released on Secretly Canadian in August 2013.

In June 2015, Porcelain Raft released the five-track Half Awake EP via Volcanic Field, Remiddi's label. The EP was available digitally and via limited edition cassette tape.

== Mauro Remiddi ==
Remiddi reportedly began experimenting with music when he was ten years old, playing his grandmother's piano and making make-believe radio programs on a small tape-recorder. He began touring around Italy when he was 20, playing accordion with a klezmer trio. Although he held other jobs to support himself, sometimes doing sound engineering or playing piano in hotels, he continued to tour Europe, and when he was twenty-seven he moved to London. From there, he continued to work with other artists and to tour as the lead vocalist, 12-string guitarist, and sometimes-drummer of Sunny Day Sets Fire, a 5-piece rock band. In 2000, Remiddi spent three months in New York playing piano for an Off-Broadway show, and after spending 12 years in London, performing with rock bands and collaborating with visual artists, he traveled back to the city for the annual CMJ music conference, met his wife, and moved to Brooklyn two weeks later.

== 2010 to present ==
In the first year and a half of working as Porcelain Raft, Remiddi self-released a handful of singles and EPs on Bandcamp, put out his first official EP with Acéphale, and began playing local venues as a solo artist. The live shows, for which only one other musician, Michael Wallace (drummer) joined him onstage, featured music from Strange Weekend. In 2011, The New York Times featured Porcelain Raft in a review, describing the sound of one show at the New York venue the Mercury Lounge as an updated form "of shoegaze pop, the spacier side of new wave, contemplative indie rock." In 2012, Porcelain Raft performed two exclusive live-sessions for MTV HIVE filmed a "Take Away Show" for La Blogoteque, and was featured on NBC NY's Non-stop Sound. Consequence of Sound included "Strange Weekend" in a list of 2012's most anticipated albums. The Guardian featured Porcelain Raft as "New Band of the Day" on September 27, 2010 and in November of the same year gave Remiddi another feature in the "First Sight" series. In January 2012, The Boston Globe included Porcelain Raft in their Arts section "annual roundup of artists to keep an ear out for in 2012."

In 2015, Remiddi moved to Los Angeles and started his own label, Volcanic Field, which released the EP "Half Awake" followed by his third album "Microclimate". In 2020, Remiddi self released Porcelain Raft's fourth album, "Come Rain". The title track "Come Rain" was featured in the 2022 documentary "Sam Now", directed by Reed Harkness.

=== Strange Weekend ===
Upon relocating to New York, Remiddi immediately began to record Strange Weekend, inspired by his new environment. He describes the record as "a snapshot of [himself] being in New York, in a basement.”

==== Track listing ====
1. Drifting In and Out
2. Shapeless & Gone
3. Is It Too Deep For You?
4. Put Me To Sleep
5. Backwords
6. Unless You Speak From Your Heart
7. The End Of Silence
8. If You Have A Wish
9. Picture
10. The Way In

==== Critical reception ====
In February 2012, Pitchfork named “Unless You Speak From Your Heart” Best New Track. The A.V.Club wrote “Assembled in a Brooklyn basement, Porcelain Raft’s debut Strange Weekend has this DIY aesthetic, but tolerates no defects in presentation. Italian native Mauro Remiddi’s solo project is built on meticulously constructed and delicately polished dream-pop soundscapes, delivered with urgency and momentum.“

=== Permanent Signal ===
On June 19, 2013, Porcelain Raft announced their second record, Permanent Signal, would be released August 20, 2013. A month later, the first single, "The Way Out," was released as a self-directed visual stream by Mauro Remiddi.

== Discography ==
=== Albums ===
- Desert Days (Self-released), 2025
- Come Rain (Self-released), 2020
- Microclimate (Volcanic Field), 2017
- Permanent Signal (Secretly Canadian), 2013
- Strange Weekend (Secretly Canadian), 2012

=== EPs ===
- Half Awake, Volcanic Field, 2015
- Silent Speech, Secretly Canadian, 2013
- Gone Blind Remixes, Acéphale, 2011
- Fountain's Head, self-released, 2011
- Big Orange Studios 5/31/2011, Daytrotter, 2011
- Gone Blind, Acéphale, 2011
- Ghosts of the Perfect Language, Sixteen Tambourines, 2011
- Despite Everything / The Wall, Transparent, 2010
- Collection of Porcelain, self-released, 2010
- Curve, self-released, 2010

=== Singles ===
- "Think of the Ocean," Secretly Canadian, 2013
- "Drifting In and Out," Secretly Canadian, 2012
- "Unless You Speak From Your Heart," Secretly Canadian, 2012
- "Come As You Are (Kurtvana cover)," self-released, 2011
- "Tip of Your Tongue," Acéphale, 2010
