= Intimacy (Bloc Party album) =

2008 studio album by Bloc Party

Studio album by Bloc Party
- Released: 21 August 2008
- Recorded: February–June 2008
- Studios: The Garage (Kent); The Pool (London); Miloco (London); Olympic (London)
- Genres: Indie rock; alternative dance; new rave
- Length: 48:04
- Label: Wichita
- Producers: Paul Epworth; Jacknife Lee

Bloc Party chronology
A Weekend in the City (2007)	Intimacy (2008)	Intimacy Remixed (2009)

Singles from Intimacy
- 1. "Mercury" Released: 11 August 2008; 2. "Talons" Released: 20 October 2008; 3. "One Month Off" Released: 26 January 2009

Alternative cover
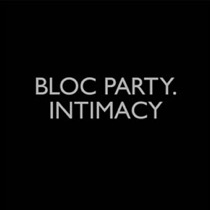
- Original digital download

Intimacy is the third studio album by English indie rock band Bloc Party. It was recorded in two weeks at several locations in London and Kent during 2008 and was produced by Jacknife Lee and Paul Epworth. The band members made the album available for purchase on their website as a digital download on 21 August 2008. Minimal promotion was undertaken in the UK. The record was released in compact disc form on 24 October 2008, with Wichita Recordings as the primary label. It peaked at number 8 on the UK Albums Chart and entered the Billboard 200 in the United States at number 18.

Bloc Party wanted to create an album that further distanced the band from the traditional rock set-up by incorporating more electronic elements and unconventional musical arrangements. As the record's title suggests, its tracks are about personal relationships and are loosely based on one of frontman Kele Okereke's break-ups in 2007. Three songs were released as singles: "Mercury", "Talons", and "One Month Off"; the first two tracks entered the UK Top 40. Intimacy was generally well received by critics. Reviewers often focused on its rush-release and central theme, and considered them either bold steps or poor choices.

== Origins and recording ==
Bloc Party's second album A Weekend in the City, released in 2007, allowed the quartet to evolve sonically by including more electronically processed soundscapes, but the band members were not entirely comfortable with more daring musical arrangements when making the record. According to multi-instrumentalist Gordon Moakes, the impromptu November 2007 single "Flux" "opened a door to the fact that we could go in any direction" in future works. After the NME Big Gig in February 2008, the band members took a month off from touring and did not interact with each other during that period. Moakes felt that there were no rules when the band re-assembled for studio work. Chief lyricist Okereke completed most of the songwriting before the recording process.

You know what the parameters are. You aren't stifled by having too much choice. You know what you have to do in this time frame to make it work. Whereas if we had a whole year in a studio it would have been a very different record. That's the conditions that Bloc Party thrive under: having to work quickly.

— Kele Okereke, on Bloc Party's methods during the recording of Intimacy

In mid-2008, Bloc Party attended secret sessions at studios in the south-east of England. The band aimed to use a similar process to the creation of "Flux", which was crafted in a week. Paul Epworth and Jacknife Lee—from Bloc Party's previous albums, Silent Alarm and A Weekend in the City, respectively—returned to the production staff for Intimacy, because the band members felt that they had "unfinished business" with both. Okereke has stated that having two producers allowed for musical experimentation. Epworth focused on capturing the dynamic of a live band by working on fully developed songs and emphasising the rhythm section in the mix. Lee aided the band members' evolution towards a more electronic style by creating tracks with them. Each producer worked on five of the record's original ten tracks.

According to Okereke, Bloc Party wanted to make something as stylised as R&B or electronica, combining the rawness of Silent Alarm and the recording experience gained from A Weekend in the City. The frontman drew inspiration from Siouxsie and the Banshees' 1988 song "Peek-a-Boo" and aimed to create "rock interpretations of dance". The band worked by initially performing soundchecks with only guitar chords, keyboard notes, and drum beats. Discussing the interplay between rhythm guitarist Okereke and lead guitarist Russell Lissack, Epworth has stated that "Kele will do one thing that creates a great deal of impact, whereas Russell's very good at subtle embellishments and leading the melodic side of things outside of the vocal". The band members decided to record the first ten tracks crafted after judging first ideas to often be the best. They "thrived" under the pressure of timed sessions, which lasted only two weeks.

Moakes has indicated that there was no worry about whether a song could be recreated live in concert in the same way as it would appear on record. A brass section and a chamber choir were hired as additional musicians. Drum machines and distorted guitars were used more extensively than in Bloc Party's previous works to create a sense of manipulation to the basic rock palette. Drummer Matt Tong was initially sceptical of moulding songs with programmed drums, as opposed to using his physical output, but agreed to the idea when the band recorded some of the tracks in their entirety. On some songs, the guitars were disregarded and the band focused solely on the beat. Okereke's voice was often used as an instrument by being looped, vocoded, or run through effects pedals.

== Promotion and release ==
After the studio sessions, Bloc Party embarked on a tour of North American and European summer festivals. One of the recorded tracks, "Mercury", was released as a single on 11 August 2008 and peaked at number 16 on the UK singles chart. At the time, the band confirmed the existence of further material, but noted that a record release date was scheduled for the end of 2008 at the earliest. Bloc Party unexpectedly announced the completion of Intimacy on 18 August 2008 via a webcast and confirmed a release within 60 hours. The band members wanted to revive the importance of a new album's release in an era in which the excitement has dissipated because of extensive Internet coverage. They were inspired by Radiohead's marketing of In Rainbows in 2007, but did not consider a "free" sale option. Little press was undertaken in the UK to promote the record because of Okereke's reluctance to discuss personal aspects of his life.

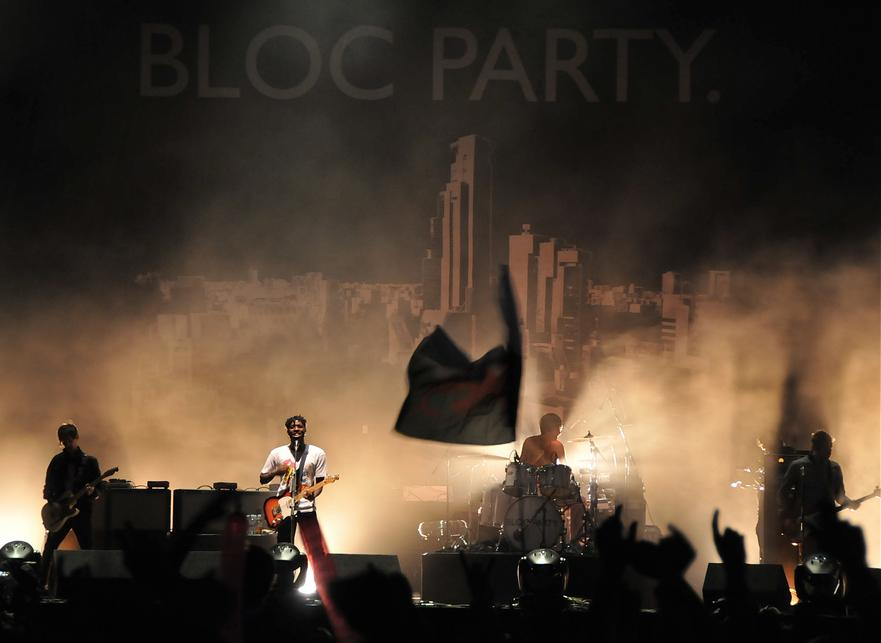
Bloc Party during a performance of songs from Intimacy at the 2008 Reading Festival days after the album's online release

Intimacy was made available for download on Bloc Party's website on 21 August 2008. Ten MP3 tracks were sold with a plain black JPEG cover for £5, and a £10 option for the online songs and the future expanded CD was also available. The album title was picked as a "double bluff" with regard to people's expectations; Okereke has explained, "You'd think of wet balladeering. You don't think it's gonna be ugly or harsh. But that's what relationships are really like. It's not just about good times." The release was called "rushed" by publications such as Billboard and The Independent. Tong disagreed with the label and stated that Bloc Party wanted to make a statement that was surprising to anyone interested in their work.

The band showcased tracks from Intimacy at Reading Festival at the end of August 2008 and embarked on a North American tour during September. UK appearances on the MTV2 Gonzo Tour and the release of the second single, "Talons", preceded the physical release of the album in October, which entered the UK Albums Chart at number eight. In the US, the record sold 24,000 copies during the first week of release and debuted at number 18 on the Billboard 200. By August 2012 it had sold 85,000 copies in the United States. Comprehensive sales figures have not been published because the digital download data has not been publicly reported by Bloc Party. The chosen cover art is a stylised shot of a couple kissing, taken by freelance photographer Perry Curties. It was ranked at number 23 on Gigwise's list of The Best Album Covers of 2008, in which the publication called it "intimate and rather ambiguous".

== Content ==
=== Lyrics ===
The lyrics of Intimacy were inspired by a relationship break-up Okereke went through at the end of 2007. The lyricist told Rolling Stone, "I wouldn't want anyone to think it's the clichéd break-up record but I haven't written about true, personal experiences all that much in the past." The move to more intimate subject matter was "semi-conscious" because the band members did not want to focus on socio-political issues as they had in their previous works. Three tracks allude to Greek mythology: "Ares" draws its name from the god of war, "Trojan Horse" is named after the Trojan War military ruse, and "Zephyrus" draws its name from the god of the west wind. The narrative in the songs occurs between two people and focuses on the relations between lovers, friends, and enemies; Okereke indicated that "it's about moments of shared vulnerability". "Better Than Heaven" references the Garden of Eden and Corinthians (15:22), because the lyricist wanted to explore the themes of sex and death, especially in a biblical context.

"Ion Square"
The chorus of "Ion Square" borrows a line from E. E. Cummings and is Okereke's favourite track on the record. The song contains studio effects such as overdubbing.

"Biko" means "Please" (or more accurately "I implore you") in Igbo—a language spoken in Nigeria, the homeland of Okereke's parents—and is used "when you're beseeching someone to do something". Okereke denied that it is about the murdered South African anti-apartheid protester Steve Biko. The lyrics of "One Month Off" reference feelings of anger and are about being in love with someone younger and unfaithful, while "Zephyrus" concerns an apology following neglect. The lyrics in the chorus of "Ion Square", the last track on the original download release, are based on E. E. Cummings' poem "I Carry Your Heart with Me". Okereke considers the song a personal favourite because it evokes the initial exciting stages of a new relationship when everything is going right.

=== Composition ===
Okereke has discussed a natural progression in Bloc Party's compositional style to a more explorative, electronic direction. For the opening track on Intimacy, "Ares", Okereke was inspired to rap his lyrics after listening to the old-school hip-hop of Afrika Bambaataa. According to Heather Phares of AllMusic, the song includes siren-like guitar chords and loud, complex drumming in the vein of dance acts The Prodigy and The Chemical Brothers. "Mercury" continues the complex drumming theme by incorporating layered percussion and contains a vocally manipulated chorus. The track is an attempt at drum and bass and features brass dissonance, effects Okereke has called "harsh, glacial, layered and energetic". "Zephyrus" begins with a solitary vocal line accompanied only by a drum machine pattern, while the Exmoor Singers provide background vocals in the rest of the composition. "Signs" is the only song that does not include guitars; instead, it is made up of a synthesiser pulse and multitracked samples of glockenspiel and mbira resembling the work of minimalist composer Steve Reich.

Okereke has conceded that Intimacy covers Bloc Party's typical indie rock elements, but noted that the guitars have an artificial and manipulated sound, "almost like all the humanity has been bleached out". "Halo" has a fast tempo coupled with a guitar melody that uses only four chords, while "Trojan Horse" features syncopated guitars and distortion. "Talons" also incorporates distortion from both lead and rhythm guitars, while the final single "One Month Off" consists of tribal rhythms and sixteenth note guitar riffs. "Biko" has a slower tempo and includes guitar arpeggi throughout, while "Ion Square" incorporates guitar overdubbing and the use of hi-hat patterns throughout. According to Nick Southall of Drowned in Sound, "Better Than Heaven" encapsulates what Bloc Party had been trying to achieve in their previous works, "namely aligning all their different directional desires: to swoon, to rock, and to experiment all at once". The track features broken beats and layered vocals.

== Critical reception ==
Media response to Intimacy was generally favourable. According to review aggregator Metacritic, the album has an average critic review score of 69/100, based on 27 reviews. Steven Robertshaw of Alternative Press described the album as arguably Bloc Party's finest career moment and noted that it offers "sweat and circuitry, savagery and submission, and a captivating energy that's severely lacking in many music scenes on the planet". Kyle Anderson of Rolling Stone claimed that by "replacing Bloc Party's distant cool with vivid honesty, Okereke makes Intimacy a confident new peak for his band", while PopMatters' Ross Langager explained that the record "might not actually be all that intimate, but it is a thing of rough, recycled beauty". Adam Mazmanian of The Washington Times commented that the album's final mix showed that producers Epworth and Lee preserved the essence of Bloc Party's signature sound—"minor key rock thrumming with rhythmic intensity"—while taking the band in new musical directions. Dave Simpson of The Guardian concluded that it would please old and new fans alike by being "brave, individual and heartfelt".

Pitchfork's Ian Cohen was less receptive and asserted that the record seems like a document of a band disconnected from its musical strengths. Josh Modell of Spin felt that Intimacy sometimes gets "sonically or lyrically precarious", while John Robinson of Uncut commented that "there's an air of slightly hedged bets". Drowned in Sound's Nick Southall claimed that the record is not quite the radical statement Bloc Party set out to achieve, but concluded that it is "definitely a little bit of invigorating redemption at a time when doubts were beginning to cloud what was, initially, a flawless reputation". In its year-end music review for 2008, Under the Radar stated about the band members, "They are so solid and so confident that it seems inevitable that they will get many chances to slowly drift into more daring lands. But without more risk, they may be destined to make albums like Intimacy – accomplished and intriguing, but not life changing, not classic." The record figured in several publications' end-of-year best album lists for 2008—notably, at number 14 by Gigwise, at number 36 by Drowned in Sound, and at number 49 by NME.

== Track listing ==
All tracks are written by Bloc Party.

No.	Title	Length
1.	"Ares"	3:30
2.	"Mercury"	3:53
3.	"Halo"	3:36
4.	"Biko"	5:01
5.	"Trojan Horse"	3:32
6.	"Signs"	4:40
7.	"One Month Off"	3:39
8.	"Zephyrus"	4:35
9.	"Talons"	4:43
10.	"Better Than Heaven"	4:22
11.	"Ion Square"	6:33

Deluxe edition bonus tracks
No.	Title	Length
12.	"Letter to My Son"	4:26
13.	"Your Visits Are Getting Shorter"	4:21

Japanese bonus tracks
No.	Title	Length
12.	"Letter to My Son"	4:26
13.	"Your Visits Are Getting Shorter"	4:21
14.	"Talons" (acoustic)	4:32
15.	"Signs" (acoustic)	3:24

North American bonus tracks
No.	Title	Length
12.	"Letter to My Son"	4:26
13.	"Your Visits Are Getting Shorter"	4:21
14.	"Flux"	3:36
15.	"Idea for a Story"	5:04
16.	"Mercury" (CSS remix)	4:07
17.	"Talons" (XXXChange remix)	6:30

iTunes bonus tracks
No.	Title	Length
12.	"Letter to My Son"	4:26
13.	"Your Visits Are Getting Shorter"	4:21
14.	"Flux"	3:36
15.	"Talons" (acoustic)	4:32
16.	"Signs" (acoustic)	3:24

2009 re-release
No.	Title	Length
12.	"Letter to My Son"	4:26
13.	"Your Visits Are Getting Shorter"	4:21
14.	"One More Chance"	4:39

Rolling Stone Presents Bloc Party Remixed
No.	Title	Length
1.	"Mercury" (CSS Remix)	4:04
2.	"Talons" (Midfield General Dub)	10:18
3.	"One Month Off" (Filthy Dukes Vocal)	5:45
4.	"Letter to My Son" (Gold Panda Remix)	5:30

- The download-only release in August 2008 did not include "Talons".
- The iTunes version of the October release included an extra Bloc Party EP, Live from London, which contains six songs from Intimacy performed live.
- The deluxe edition includes access to an online exclusive film, Live and Intimate, which contains footage of Bloc Party performing several Intimacy tracks plus "Banquet" live at The Pool, Miloco Studios.
- In 2009, the deluxe edition of Intimacy was remixed as Intimacy Remixed by artists including Mogwai, Armand Van Helden, and No Age.
- The Gold Panda remix of "Letter to My Son" was erroneously labelled as being by Golden Panda on the Rolling Stone CD.

=== Vinyl ===
- A standard black LP copy in a gatefold sleeve was released in October 2008 with the normal track listing, but with an original mix of "Mercury" instead of the CD version. The North American edition also included a code for the free online download of the tracks in MP3 format.
- A limited edition picture disc vinyl version was additionally released in the UK; it had the album cover printed on Side A and the track listing printed on Side B.

== Personnel ==
The people involved in the making of Intimacy are the following:

Bloc Party

- Kele Okereke – lead vocals, rhythm guitar, loops
- Russell Lissack – lead guitar
- Gordon Moakes – bass guitar, backing vocals, synthesiser, glockenspiel, electronic drums, sampler
- Matt Tong – drums, drum machine, backing vocals

Brass section

- Avshalom Caspi – brass arrangements
- Guy Barker – trumpet
- Paul Archibald – trumpet
- Sid Gault – trumpet
- Derek Watkins – trumpet
- Christopher Dean – trombone
- Roger Harvey – trombone
- Dan Jenkins – trombone
- Colin Sheen – trombone

Chamber choir

- James Jarvis – music director
- The Exmoor Singers of London – sopranos, altos, tenors, basses

Production

- Paul Epworth – producer, programming, keyboards
- Jacknife Lee – producer, programming, keyboards
- Sam Bell – recording, additional programming
- Mark Rankin – recording
- Phil Rose – recording (choral and brass)
- Matt Wiggins – recording assistant
- Tom Hough – recording assistant
- Alan Moulder – mixing
- Darren Lawson – mixing assistant
- Guy Davie – mastering

Artwork

- Perry Curties – photography
- Rob Crane – design

== Chart positions ==
=== Weekly charts ===
Chart (2008)	Peak position
Australian Albums (ARIA)	5
Austrian Albums (Ö3 Austria)	39
Belgian Albums (Ultratop Flanders)	2
Belgian Albums (Ultratop Wallonia)	16
Canadian Albums (Billboard)	17
Dutch Albums (Album Top 100)	35
French Albums (SNEP)	22
German Albums (Offizielle Top 100)	18
Irish Albums (IRMA)	12
Italian Albums (FIMI)	97
Japanese Albums (Oricon)	23
New Zealand Albums (RMNZ)	14
Swiss Albums (Schweizer Hitparade)	37
UK Albums (Official Charts)	8
US Billboard 200	18
US Top Alternative Albums (Billboard)	5
US Top Rock Albums (Billboard)	7

=== Year-end charts ===
Chart (2008)	Position
Belgian Albums (Ultratop Flanders)	89

=== Singles ===
Song	Peak
Song	UK
"Mercury"	16
"Talons"	39
"One Month Off"	170

== Release history ==
Region	Date	Label	Format(s)	Catalog
World	21 August 2008	Wichita Recordings	Digital download	—
Europe	24 October 2008	Universal Records	Deluxe CD	3629185
Europe	24 October 2008	Wichita Recordings	CD	WEBB185
United Kingdom and Ireland	27 October 2008	Wichita Recordings	CD, deluxe CD, digital download, LP	WEBB185
North America	28 October 2008	Atlantic	CD, LP	512336
North America	28 October 2008	Atlantic	Deluxe CD, digital download	512335
