= Tony Dawson (disambiguation) =

Tony Dawson is a basketball player.

Tony Dawson may also refer to:

- Tony Dawson (tennis), Australian-American tennis player
- Tony Dawson (badminton), Scottish badminton player
- Tony Dawson (physician), British gastroenterologist
- Tony Dawson, candidate in Sefton Council election, 2012

== See also ==
- Anthony Dawson (disambiguation)
- Tony Dawson-Harrison, American rapper/singer, dancer and music producer
