= Harlem Shake (meme) =

Internet meme

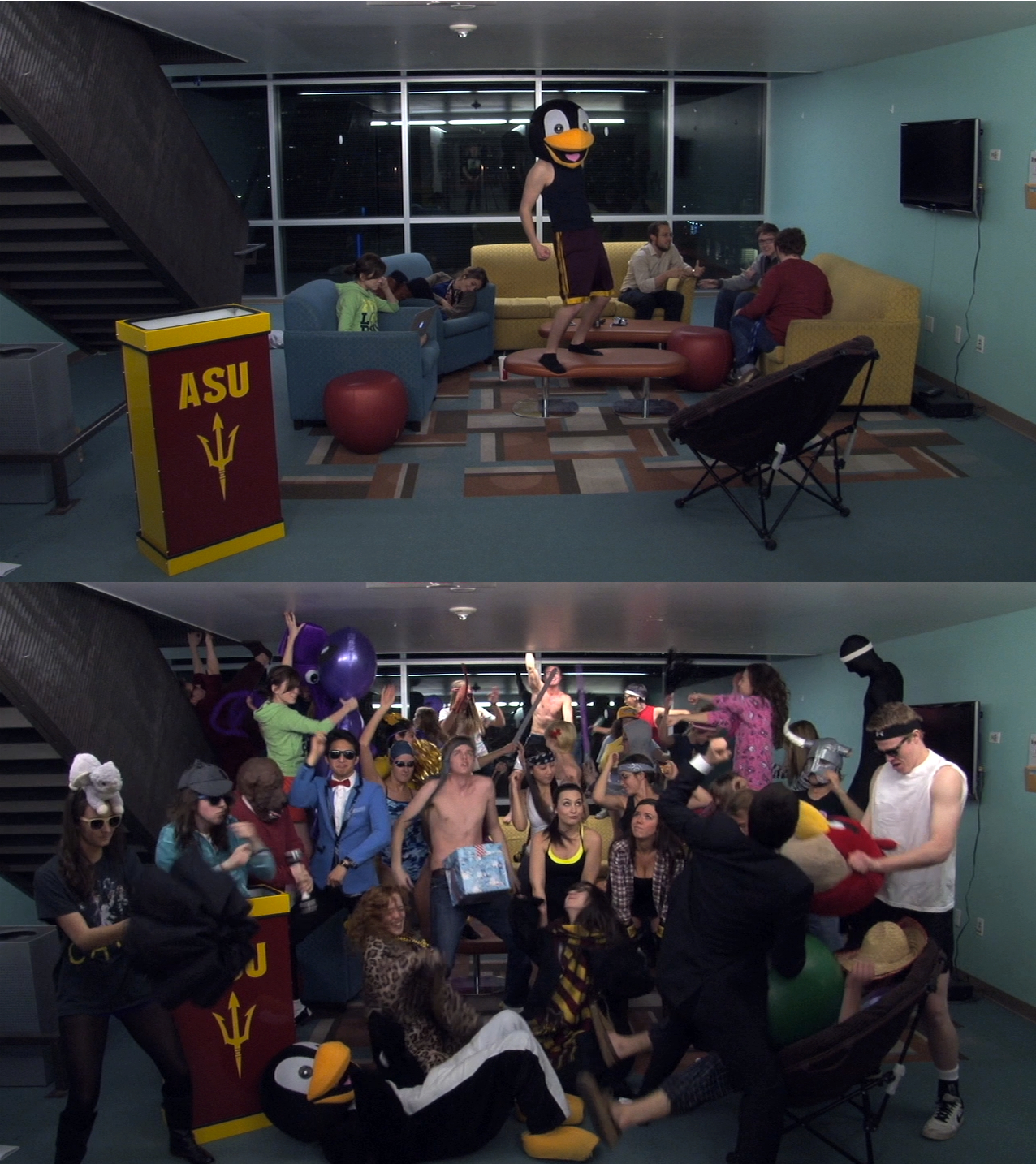
Screenshots from a Harlem Shake video, showing the characteristic static jump cut from one dancer to a wild dance party after the song's drop

The Harlem Shake is an Internet meme in the form of a video in which a group of people dance to a short excerpt from the song "Harlem Shake". The meme became viral in early February 2013, with thousands of "Harlem Shake" videos being made and uploaded to YouTube every day at the height of its popularity.

The meme usually features participants performing flailing or convulsive movements usually dressed in outlandish costumes while wielding unexpected props. The meme form was established in a video uploaded on January 30, 2013, by YouTube personality George Miller on his DizastaMusic channel. The video featured the character "Pink Guy" from The Filthy Frank Show entitled "Filthy Compilation #6 – Smell My Fingers", which featured a section where several costumed people danced to the song "Harlem Shake" by Baauer. The video opens with the first use of the Harlem Shake meme, and started a viral trend of people uploading their own "Harlem Shake" videos to YouTube.

Despite its name, the meme does not actually involve participants performing the original Harlem Shake dance, a street and hip hop dance that originated in 1980s Harlem, New York City.

== Concept ==
A Harlem Shake video by Rolling Stone Indonesia (no sound)

A Harlem Shake video by U.S. Marines in Japan (no sound)

The videos usually last about 30 seconds and feature an excerpt of the 2012 song "Harlem Shake" by American music producer and DJ Baauer. Baauer's song starts with a 15-second intro, a bass drop, then 15 seconds with the bass, and a lion/beast-like roar at the end of the first 30 seconds. Usually, a video begins with one person (often helmeted or masked) dancing to the song alone for 15 seconds, surrounded by other people not paying attention or seemingly unaware of the dancing individual. When the bass drops, the video cuts to the entire group dancing for the rest of the video. The dancing style should not be confused with the original Harlem Shake dance. Additionally, in the second half of the video, people often wear either a minimum of clothes or outlandish outfits or costumes while wielding strange props. Typically, but not always, the video will end by converting to slow motion on the wild feline/beast growl.

== Success ==
This success of the videos was in part attributed to the anticipation of the breakout moment and short length, making them very accessible to watch. The Washington Post explained the meme's instant virality by referring to the jump cuts, hypnotic beat, quick setups, and half minute routines.

The Harlem Shake is technically very easy for fans to reproduce, as it consists of a single locked camera shot and one jump cut. Nonetheless, the simplicity of the concept allows fans considerable scope in creating their own distinctive variant and making their mark, while retaining the basic elements. In its simplest form, it could be made with just one person; a more sophisticated version might even involve a crowded stadium. Moreover, there is a level playing field for celebrities and fans alike, with no guarantee of success for either group. There is a strong vein of humour running through each video that is not dependent on language, further increasing its potential to spread virally.

== History ==
=== Creation ===
The "Harlem Shake" meme was first featured as the opening segment in a video by Japanese then-YouTuber Filthy Frank under his viral Pink Guy persona as a skit on his YouTube channel "DizastaMusic". Five teenagers from Australia, using the name TheSunnyCoastSkate, replicated this segment in their own video, which quickly gained popularity. As more people replicated the original video and uploaded their own versions to YouTube, Harlem Shake rapidly became an Internet meme.

=== Viral spread ===
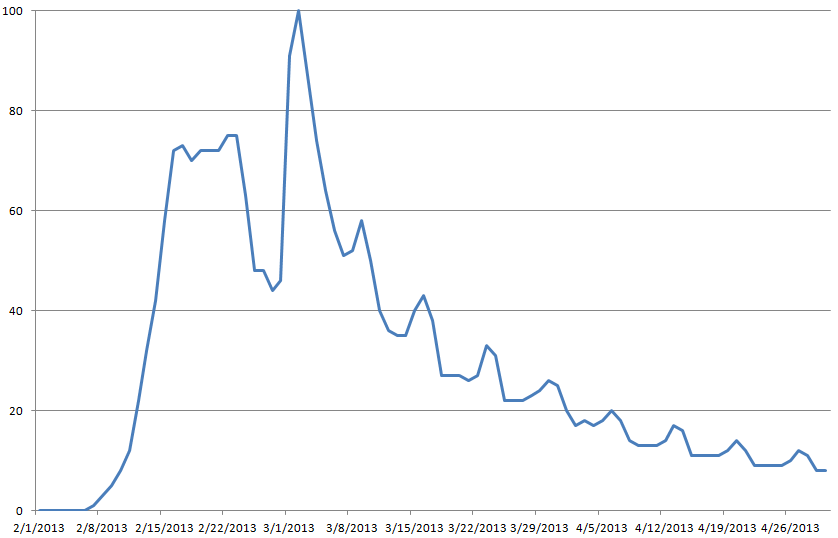
Google search interest for "Harlem Shake" February–April 2013

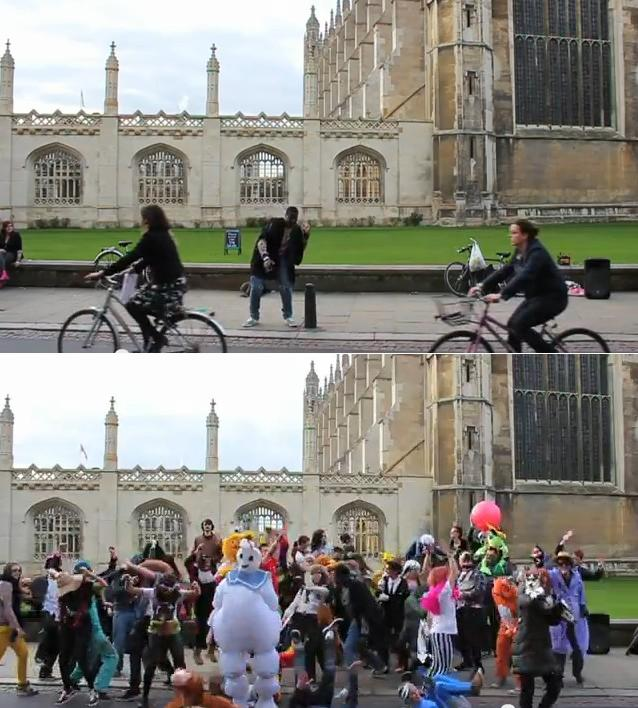
Cambridge, UK; images of one of 4000 videos a day uploaded at the peak of the meme's popularity.

On February 10, 2013, the upload rate of Harlem Shake videos reached 4,000 per day, or one every 21.6 seconds. As of February 11, about 12,000 versions of the popular Internet meme had been uploaded to YouTube, garnering over 44 million unique views. By February 15, about 40,000 Harlem Shake spinoff videos had been uploaded, generating over 700 million views. On February 26, 2013, the trend created by the YouTube creator TooTurntTony led to the suspension of over a dozen students at Milford High School (Michigan).

Harlem Shake hit the 1 billion view mark on March 24, 2013, just 40 days after its first upload, according to Visible Measures. From the day when the first video was uploaded until it hit 1 billion views, the videos were accumulating an average of more than 20 million views a day. The time it took for Harlem Shake to hit 1 billion views is half the time "Gangnam Style" took to hit 1 billion views and almost a sixth of the time that it took "Call Me Maybe". On April 4, Harlem Shake had 1.21 billion views.

Baauer's single reached #1 on the iTunes America chart and #2 on iTunes in the UK and Australia on February 15, 2013.

Its popularity has spread in many countries, including the US, the UK, Canada, Australia, Germany, Russia, and much of Europe, China, India, Latin America, the United Arab Emirates, and Jamaica.

The Guinness World Record for the largest crowd doing the Harlem shake was created in 2013 with a crowd of 3,444 people taking part. Matt and Kim organised the record, which was performed at the Rensselaer Polytechnic Institute's Houston Field House arena in Troy, New York, on 11 February 2013.

=== Legacy ===
The unexpected success of Harlem Shake caused Billboard to bring forward its plans, following two years of discussions, to incorporate data on YouTube views as one of three metrics used to calculate the influential Billboard Hot 100 chart. This marked an important recognition that YouTube now plays a vital role in shaping cultural trends, defining hit songs ahead of radio programmers.

In consequence of this significant change, Baauer's "Harlem Shake" made its debut at No. 1 on the Billboard Hot 100 on February 21, 2013. Without the change the song would only have debuted in the Top 15. In the year-end chart on that same year, "Harlem Shake" became the 4th best song of 2013, behind "Radioactive" by Imagine Dragons. This makes it the only song to become an internet meme to hit the top 10 on the Billboard year-end chart through the 2010s.

The success of Harlem Shake also highlights a change of direction for music rights holders. With the exception of a takedown notice issued when artist Azealia Banks tried to upload her own version of the track, Baauer and his label, Mad Decent records, instead made use of YouTube's Content ID database to assert copyright over the fan-made videos and claim a proportion of advertising revenue in respect of each one.

== Reception ==
Martin Talbot, managing director of the Official Charts Company in the UK, described "Harlem Shake" as a "phenomenon", the first ever "crowd sourced video" to significantly drive the sales of a song. Previously, as happened with "Gangnam Style", there was always an initial video created by an artist which would start a dance craze that was subsequently adopted by fans.

The meme received peak attention for only a few months, with many companies and startups uploading their own versions for promotional purposes. Ad Age later identified sixty advertising agencies exploiting the meme, calling it "played-out" after Pepsico released a Harlem Shake video featuring dancing soft drinks. Gabrielle Levy of UPI called the Pepsi ad "a bridge too far," noting that low production values had been "part of the charm" of the meme.

== Notable performances ==
Various groups that shot videos of themselves doing the Harlem Shake included the staff of Late Night with Jimmy Fallon, a squadron of the Norwegian Army; Swedish police, basketball players from the Dallas Mavericks, and the Miami Heat whose version was called perhaps "the best ... [o]r at least the most irreverent" by Matt Eppers of USA Today; IMG Academy American football players, the Nebraska Cornhuskers football team and LSU Tigers football team, the Canterbury Crusaders and Auckland Blues rugby union sides, football clubs from Manchester City, Swansea City, Fulham, Juventus, Crystal Palace, SC Cambuur, and the colleagues of CNN newsanchor Anderson Cooper Other participants in the craze included the University of Georgia swim team, whose video received at least 38 million views, music producer and international DJ Markus Schulz, "a senior community," NASCAR drivers Jeff Gordon and Jimmie Johnson, musicians Matt & Kim, musician Azealia Banks, the staff of The Daily Show, Ryan Seacrest, Stephen Colbert, Rhett & Link, members of the WWE, EastEnders actors Himesh Patel and Ricky Norwood and Playboy Playmates.

A video titled "Harlem Shake (Grandma Edition)", in which a man and his two octogenarian grandmothers dance, received over a million views online within three days. It was broadcast on the Today show and CNN.

On February 20, 2013, the cast of American reality television series Splash including Kareem Abdul-Jabbar, Katherine Webb, Ndamukong Suh and Louie Anderson also uploaded a video of them dancing on the clip. The same day, Australian singer Cody Simpson uploaded a video of his crew and him doing the Harlem Shake in his tour bus.

On Valentine's Day (February 14), developers at Moovweb released an open source bookmarklet that replicated the Harlem Shake online by making the items on any web page move. Soon after YouTube made its own version of the Harlem Shake by making the interface of the page shake when the user searches for "do the Harlem Shake".

On February 22 in Tel Aviv, 70,000 people danced during a "pre-Purim street party".

On March 1, 2013, Fox uploaded the "Homer Shake" on YouTube, an animated video where members of the Simpson family danced to the eponymous song. It was the couch gag for the "Gorgeous Grampa" episode.

The March 9, 2013, episode of Saturday Night Live substituted "con los terroristas" with "tofu burritos" and "do the Harlem shake" with "drink a vegan shake". Justin Timberlake appeared as his street performer character, dressed as a block of tofu.

On March 18, 2013, the cast of the Armenian TV series Kargin Serial uploaded their Harlem Shake on YouTube.

On March 23, 2013, Nickelodeon did their own version of the Harlem Shake at the Kids' Choice Awards, which was called the Kids' Choice Shake.

At the Hong Kong Sevens rugby tournament in March 2013, an entire stand of spectators took part in a Harlem Shake.

The TV series Supernatural, starring Jared Padalecki and Jensen Ackles, did its own Harlem Shake version. It began with a normal shot of Ackles, dancing randomly, with Padalecki on his phone behind him, seemingly unaware.

The Harlem Shake was also performed in "Sweet Dreams," the nineteenth episode of the fourth season of the Fox TV series Glee. The dance was performed by fictional students at the University of Lima, while Finn (Cory Monteith) monologues about life at college. "Harlem Shake" is listed as a featured song in the episode, as it was not covered by the cast or released on a single or soundtrack album.

=== Performances with unforeseen consequences ===
In February 2013, a New York boys' ice hockey team was forced to forfeit a first-round playoff game as a result of a Harlem Shake video uploaded to YouTube. The team's video, shot in a locker room, depicts scantily clad team members, notably, one player wearing nothing but a sock.

Two Israeli soldiers received prison sentences, and one was also relieved of his command, after they posted a video of soldiers performing the Harlem Shake around a cannon, even though they were reported to have notified their commanders of the project, taken care to ensure that no sensitive military equipment was shown, and sought approval for the finished video. The video was reported to have received a generally positive reaction from mainstream Israeli media and online.

In Russia, police arrested five people after they uploaded a video of themselves doing the Harlem Shake on a war memorial, an army tank from World War II.

A group of up to 15 miners in Australia were fired for breaching safety rules after uploading a video where they performed the Harlem Shake underground.

A Harlem Shake video was filmed by a group of Colorado College students and players of the college's athletic team on board a Frontier Airlines flight while flying from Denver to San Diego, CA for a tournament. The filming took place as the flight crossed the Grand Canyon. After the video was uploaded on February 15, 2013, it gained media attention, causing the U.S. Federal Aviation Administration to launch an investigation. Three of the college students who organized the event said in an interview that the flight attendants and the purser approved their permission before the performance began, saying it was a great idea and the participating passengers also found it fun. The case was finally solved when Kate O'Malley, a spokesperson for the airline, said that "all safety measures were strictly enforced and followed and that the seat belt sign was turned off during the course of filming".

In a controversial move, a student at St Hilda's College, Oxford in the United Kingdom lost her temporary job as a part-time library invigilator and student organisers were fined after a Harlem Shake video was filmed in the college library. By way of contrast, Professor Roger Ainsworth, Master of St Catherine's College, Oxford, praised his students for their version of the meme, which he described as "the best example of the genre, at least in the UK".

A religious education teacher at Caldicot Comprehensive School in the United Kingdom was suspended after a Harlem Shake video was posted online which allegedly showed him dancing with a lifesize cardboard figure of Pope Benedict XVI. According to Monmouthshire council the teacher may have behaved in an "unacceptable way".

The Washington Post reported that according to the National Coalition against Censorship, about 100 students across the US have been suspended for participating in various versions of the Harlem Shake Meme. NCAC Director Joan Bertin referred to the suspensions as "a rather disproportionate response by educators" to what she described as "teenage hijinks".

=== As a political statement ===
At the end of February 2013, hundreds of protesters chanted "Leave! Leave!" as they performed the Harlem Shake outside the headquarters of Egypt's President Mohamed Morsi. In a separate incident, people were filmed doing the Harlem Shake in front of the pyramids. Four pharmaceutical students had been arrested the previous week for breaching decency laws by performing the dance in their underwear.

In Tunisia, after students in a wealthy suburb of Tunis filmed a Harlem Shake video in which they parodied Salafists and Gulf Emirs, the school director was suspended by the Ministry of Education. The resulting backlash saw the Ministry's website hacked by activists, and according to some reports there were scuffles between Salafists and students wishing to perform the dance elsewhere in the country.

In the United States, then-Senate Minority Leader Mitch McConnell's re-election team uploaded their own Harlem Shake video as part of his campaign to win a sixth term in the chamber in the 2014 midterm elections.

In the same country on December 14, 2017, conservative site The Daily Caller uploaded a video titled "PSA from Chairman of the FCC Ajit Pai" in the wake of the FCC's decision to repeal the net neutrality policy, which received severe backlash upon upload. The video features Pai condescendingly acting out various things that can still "be done on the Internet", incorporating the Harlem Shake into a segment at the end of it. However, for the first time in the history of the usage of the meme, Baauer and eventually the record label he is signed to, Mad Decent, took legal action against Pai for unauthorized use of his music.

== See also ==
- List of Internet phenomena
- Gangnam Style
- Rickroll
