= She's Mature =

Studio album by Plastic Little
- Released: September 19, 2006
- Recorded: 2006
- Genre: Rap, Underground rap
- Length: 73:51
- Label: Traffic Entertainment, Tonearm
- Producer: Michael Squid

Plastic Little chronology
| She's Mature (2006) | Welcome to the Jang House (2008) |

She's Mature is the debut studio album by the Philadelphian rap group, Plastic Little. The album was released on September 19, 2006 through Traffic Entertainment Group.

The album contains many samples from a wide variety of sources, ranging from the 70s Disco song "The Hustle" by Van McCoy sampled in track "1-800-Grustlin" and the classic American folk song "Wade in the Water" in "The Jumpoff"; to the beat from the RZA song "4th Chamber", from GZA's Liquid Swords, being sampled in the tribute / parody "5th Chamber". Even the cover of the album mimics The Smiths single "This Charming Man".

== Advertising ==
The advertising for the album, a two part series of adverts published in Vice magazine, among others, caused some controversy for the aforementioned magazine. The initial, "a hipster's homoerotic fantasies involving Jay-Z", ran without complaint; however the latter, which disparaged hip-hop clothing line Triple 5 soul, was banned from the magazine due to, according to Graham Sanford of GapersBlock, "the mag's editors -- fearing a loss in revenue from a staple sponsor". This was, however, later overturned.

== Track listing ==
| No. | Title | Writer(s) | Producer(s) | Length |
|---|---|---|---|---|
| 1. | "Hi Bitches" (Come New Remix by King Honey) | Jayson Musson, Jon Folmar, Kurt Hunte | King Honey | 3:55 |
| 2. | "Rap O'Clock" | Musson, Hunte, Folmar | Michael Squid | 3:04 |
| 3. | "Hola Plastique" | Hunte, Folmar, Musson | Squid | 4:01 |
| 4. | "Beef Resolved" | | | 2:29 |
| 5. | "All Ya'll Niggas Dead" | Hunte, Musson, Folmar | Squid | 2:35 |
| 6. | "Creative Differences" | Hunte, Musson, Folmar | Squid, Hunte | 4:32 |
| 7. | "Club Banger" | Musson, Hunte, Squid, Folmar | Squid | 3:35 |
| 8. | "Dopeness" | Hunte, Musson | Squid | 2:02 |
| 9. | "The Jumpoff" | Folmar, Hunte, Musson | Squid | 3:08 |
| 10. | "Boys" (feat. MF Doom) | Hunte, Folmar, Musson | ROTFLOL | 3:19 |
| 11. | "Now I Hollar" (feat. Spank Rock) | Hunte, Folmar, Musson, Naeem Juwan | Diplo | 3:33 |
| 12. | "Bomb in the Club Hoe" (B.I.T.C.H.) | Musson, Folmar, Hunte | Folmar | 3:03 |
| 13. | "Get Close" (King Honey Remix) | Hunte, Folmar, Musson | King Honey | 4:10 |
| 14. | "Bum Rush the Set" (feat. Amanda Blank, DJ Low Budget) | Hunte, Folmar, Musson | J. Fowler | 4:10 |
| 15. | "1-800-Grustlin'" | Hunte, Folmar, Musson | Squid | 2:26 |
| 16. | "5th Chamber" | Hunte, Folmar, Musson | Jim Houser | 3:31 |
| 17. | "Remix!!!" | Musson, Folmar, Hunte | Squid | 3:42 |
| 18. | "4$ Love Song" | Musson | Hunte | 2:16 |
| 19. | "Steven and Billy" | Folmar, Musson, Hunte | Steven Ward James | 4:18 |
| 20. | "Crambodia" (feat Spank Rock, Amanda Blank, Ghostface Killah) | Hunte, Folmar, Musson | Fowler, King Honey | 4:48 |
| 21. | "Nemel's Outro" | | | 3:55 |
| Total length: | | | | 73:51 |

=== Hidden Track ===
There is a secret track after "Nemel's Outro". It is a remix of the song "Brooklyn" from their self-released album, Thug Paradise 2.1.

== Reception ==
Professional ratings
Review scores
| Source | Rating |
|---|---|
| Pitchfork Media | 7.4/10 |
| XLR8R | Neutral |
| Montreal Mirror | 8.5/10 stars |
| Rhapsody Music | Positive |
| Impose Magazine | Neutral |

The album received mixed reviews. Pitchfork Media awarded the album 7.4 out of 10 and had the following to say about the album and Plastic Little's general outlook and sound:

It's worth noting that for all their love/hate toggling over rap, Plastic Little have got an album cover that pays tribute to the Smiths' "This Charming Man" sleeve, and songs that sample "Heaven Knows I'm Miserable Now" and PJ Harvey's "Down By the Water" (on the surprisingly aching Diplo-produced "Now I Hollar"). So there's more to them than simple hip-hop snickering. They're art school kids exposed to the banality of indie culture, but in love with it, too. They're also guys who seemingly watch a lot of porn and enjoy rapping about it. To hear self-loathing on a rap record that has nothing to do with regrets about the street life is a welcome change-up. If Plastic Little can ever find the balance between incisive and acerbic, they're bound to hit on some sort of Spinal Rap masterpiece. Until then, at least all the beats are banging.

— Sean Fennessey

This was partially supported by Rupert Bottenberg of the Montreal Mirror who stated that "She's Mature doesn't just tread the idiot/savant axis, but strives for the extreme poles thereof. Their rhymes are rude, crude and oversexed—and ridiculously clever and funny to boot." and awarded the album an 8.5 out of 10. This does, however, also highlight a common detraction of this work; namely that, in reference to their "post-PC, ironic humor": "you've just got to have the stomach for it". Max Herman, of Impose Magazine, also mentioned that the band "are only out to clown atop SQUID's bouncy beats, which is why their music is better suited for the party rather than the iPod".

== Samples ==
- "Holla Plastique"
  - The Smiths - "Heaven Knows I'm Miserable Now"
- "Beef Resolved"
  - The Smiths - "Panic"
- "Creative Differences"
  - Dead Prez - "I'm a African"
- "The Jumpoff"
  - "Wade in the Water"
- "Now I Hollar"
  - PJ Harvey - "Down By the Water"
- "Get Close"
  - The Cure - "Close to Me"
- "1-800-Grustlin"
  - Van McCoy - "The Hustle"
- "5th Chamber"
  - RZA - "4th Chamber"
- "Crambodia"
  - Ros Sereysothea - "Chnang Jass Baiy Chgagn (Old Pot, Tasty Rice)"

== Credits ==
- Vocals – Jayson Musson, Jon Folmar, Kurt Hunte
- Featured vocalists:
  - Billy Blaise Dufala (track 19)
- Beats: Michael Squid
- Flute: Billy Blaise Dufala (track 19)
- Mixing: Si Young
- Artwork by: Anthony Smyrski
- Photography: Adam Wallacavage
