= Welcome to the Jang House =

Studio album by Plastic Little
- Released: September 28, 2008
- Recorded: 2008
- Genre: Rap
- Length: 49:24
- Label: Half Time (UK), Phantom
- Producer: Michael Squid

Plastic Little chronology
She's Mature (2006)	Welcome to the Jang House (2008)

Welcome to the Jang House is the second studio album by the Philadelphian rap group, Plastic Little. The album was released on the September 28, 2008, through Half Time Records. The album compiles tracks from their self-released album, Thug Paradise, as well as their debut album, She's Mature; adding a couple of new tracks also.

The album contains samples from a wide variety of sources, ranging from the Michael Jackson song "Thriller" sampled in "Cheap Thrills"; to The Smiths song "Heaven Knows I'm Miserable Now" in "Holla Plastique"; and even "A Whole New World" by Peabo Bryson and Regina Belle, as featured in Disneys Aladdin, in "Driz Hollering".

== Track listing ==
No.	Title	Writer(s)	Producer(s)	Length
1.	"Brooklyn"	Jayson Musson		1:20
2.	"Boyz"	Musson, Jon Folmar, Kurt Hunte, Jacob Ciocci	ROTFLOL	3:18
3.	"Cheap Thrills" (16 bar version)	Rod Temperton	Joshua Harvey	3:20
4.	"I'm Not a Thug"	Musson, Folmar, Hunte, Ben Warfield	Warfield, King Honey	4:17
5.	"Cum Quick"	Musson, Folmar, Michael Squid	Squid	3:26
6.	"Hola Plastique" (King Krash remix)	Musson, Folmar, Hunte	King Krash	4:24
7.	"Crambodia" (feat Spank Rock, Amanda Blank, Ghostface Killah)	Musson, Folmar, Hunte, Amanda Mallory, Naeem Juwan	Folmar, King Honey	4:50
8.	"Hi Bitches"	Musson, Folmar, Hunte, Max Lawrence	King Honey	4:27
9.	"La La Land" (feat. Joshua Harvey)	Musson, Hunte, Si Young Lee	Harvey	3:45
10.	"The Jumpoff"	Musson, Folmar, Hunte, Squid	Squid	3:08
11.	"Driz Hollering"	Musson, Folmar, Hunte, Squid	Squid	4:47
12.	"Sugar"	Musson, Folmar, Hunte, Young, K. Barry	Young, Folmar	3:08
13.	"Foil"	Musson, Folmar, Hunte, Squid	Stern	5:14
Total length:				49:24

== Reception ==
Professional ratings
Review scores
Source	Rating
musicOMH	4/5 stars
The Guardian	3/5 stars
dailymusicguide	4/5 stars
Music Week	Positive
Subba-Cultcha	10/10 stars
tourdates.co.uk	Positive
Noize Makes Enemies	Positive
mewbox	Positive
Shout4Music	4/10 stars

The album received mainly positive reviews, with critics praising Little's ability to blend many genres together into one album while still sounding "fresh and bold"; their "tongue-in-cheek brilliance"; and their "biting critique of society at large" and "acerbic wit and intelligence". Ron ONeill, of online music magazine Subba-Cultcha gave the album a perfect score and stated that this album was "Easily one of the freshest rap albums to appear in the last few years. A clever and well-defined collection of electro, Philly house, hip-hop, wit and sampling".

== Samples ==
- "Cheap Thrills"
  - Michael Jackson - "Thriller"
- "Holla Plastique"
  - The Smiths - "Heaven Knows I'm Miserable Now"
- "The Jumpoff"
  - "Wade in the Water"
- "Driz Hollering"
  - Peabo Bryson & Regina Belle - "A Whole New World"
- "Sugar"
  - The Archies - "Sugar, Sugar"

== Credits ==
- Vocals - Jayson Musson, Jon Folmar, Kurt Hunte
- Beats - Michael Stern
- Mixing - Si Young
