= Mercury (song) =

Single by Bloc Party

from the album Intimacy
- Released: 10 July 2008
- Recorded: 2008
- Genre: Indietronica; alternative dance; drum and bass
- Length: 3:50
- Label: Wichita
- Songwriters: Russell Lissack, Kele Okereke, Matt Tong
- Producer: Jacknife Lee

Bloc Party singles chronology
"Flux" (2007)	"Mercury" (2008)	"Talons" (2008)

"Mercury" is a song by Bloc Party. It was produced by Jacknife Lee. Like "Flux", the band's previous single, the song uses mostly electronic instruments. The song was first played on Zane Lowe's show on Radio 1 on 7 July 2008 and was uploaded to the Radio 1 website about fifteen minutes later. The single was made available for digital download on 10 July 2008. The track was named Single of the Week by Drowned in Sound on 11 August 2008. It peaked at number 16 on the UK Singles Chart. The song also appeared in the EA Sports game Fight Night Round 4 as well as Rockstar Games game Midnight Club: Los Angeles. An official remix by Hervé, subtitled "Hervé Is in Disarray Remix", was released on 2009's Intimacy Remixed.

== Music video ==
The video for "Mercury", directed by Ace Norton, was simultaneously unveiled along with the song. It portrays monkey scientists placing an assortment of body parts into a body. The resulting creature, which has a bull's horned head, a crab's pincer, and a hairy human body then rises in popularity, eventually becoming the President of the United States. The entire time, the scientists are controlling it. Eventually, the creature (named Smith) goes to war with other countries to get bananas for the monkey scientists. It was made available to view on Bloc Party's website.

== Track listing ==
=== CD: Wichita / WEBB180SCD - United Kingdom ===
No.	Title	Length
1.	"Mercury"	3:53
2.	"Mercury" (Hervé Is In Disarray remix)	4:49
3.	"Mercury" (CSS remix)	4:06
4.	"Mercury" (Flosstradamus remix)	4:47

=== CD: Wichita / WEBB180CDAU - Australia ===
No.	Title	Length
1.	"Mercury"	3:57
2.	"Mercury" (extended 12" version)	6:56
3.	"Idea for a Story"	5:08
4.	"Mercury" (Hervé Is In Disarray remix)	4:54
5.	"Mercury" (Flosstradamus remix)	4:50
6.	"Mercury" (instrumental)	6:54

=== 7": Wichita / WEBB180S - United Kingdom ===
No.	Title	Length
1.	"Mercury"	3:50
2.	"Idea for a Story"	5:02

=== 12": Wichita / WEBB180T - United Kingdom ===
No.	Title	Length
1.	"Mercury" (extended 12" version)	6:48
2.	"Mercury" (instrumental)	6:48

=== Digital (iTunes Store) - United States ===
1. . Mercury (3:51)

== Charts ==
Chart (2008)	Peak position
UK Singles Chart	16
