= Nonsense in the Dark =

Studio album by Filthy Dukes
- Released: 24 March 2009
- Recorded: 2009
- Genre: Electronic rock, electropop, synthpop
- Length: 57:15
- Label: Polydor, Fiction, UMe

Filthy Dukes chronology
Nonsense in the Dark (2009)	FabricLive.48 (2009)

Singles from Nonsense in the Dark
- 1. "This Rhythm" Released: 2 February 2008; 2. "Tupac Robot Club Rock" Released: 3 November 2008; 3. "Messages" Released: 13 July 2009

Professional ratings
Review scores
Source	Rating
BBC	Positive
Contact Music	8/10 stars
The Fly	3.5/5 stars
The Independent	Positive
musicOMH	4/5 stars
NME	4/10 stars
Subba-Cultcha	8/10 stars
The Times	3/5 stars

Nonsense in the Dark is the debut studio album by English band Filthy Dukes. The album was released on 24 March 2009 through Polydor / Fiction Records.

== Track listing ==
No.	Title	Writer(s)	Length
1.	"This Rhythm" (feat. Samuel Dust)	Olly Dixon, Dust, Tim Lawton, Mark Ralph	05:15
2.	"Elevator" (feat. To My Boy)	Dixon, Lawton, Ralph, Snape	03:26
3.	"What Happens Next" (feat. Foreign Islands)	Baltulonis, Dixon, Lawton, Ralph	03:45
4.	"You Better Stop"	Dixon, Lawton, Ralph	03:36
5.	"Messages" (feat. Tommy Sparks)	Dixon, Lawton, Ralph, Sparks	03:16
6.	"Tupac Robot Club Rock" (feat. Plastic Little)	Dixon, Jayson Musson, Jon Folmar, Kurt Hunte, Si Young Lee, Ralph	04:28
7.	"Nonsense in the Dark" (feat. Orlando Weeks)	Dixon, Lawton, Ralph, Orlando Weeks	06:32
8.	"Cul-De-Sac"	Dixon, Lawton, Ralph	04:00
9.	"Light Skips Cross Heart"	Curtis, Dixon, Lawton, Ralph	04:32
10.	"Don't Fall Softly" (feat. Brandon Curtis)	Brandon Curtis, Dixon, Lawton, Ralph	04:18
11.	"Twenty Six Hundred"	Dixon, Lawton, Ralph	04:10
12.	"Poison The Ivy" (feat. frYars)	Dixon, Garrett, Lawton, Ralph	05:08
13.	"Somewhere at Sea" (feat. Mauro Remiddi)	Dixon, Lawton, Ralph, Remiddi	04:49
Total length:			57:15
