= FabricLive.48 =

Compilation album by Filthy Dukes
- Released: October 2009
- Genre: Synthpop
- Label: Fabric
- Producer: Filthy Dukes

Filthy Dukes chronology
Nonsense in the Dark (2009)	FabricLive.48 (2009)

FabricLive chronology
FabricLive.47 (2009)	FabricLive.48 (2009)	FabricLive.49 (2009)

Professional ratings
Review scores
Source	Rating
Skiddle	4.5/5 stars
Subba-Cultcha	8/10 stars
Pop Matters	5/10 stars

FabricLive.48 is a 2009 album by Filthy Dukes. The album was released as part of the FabricLive Mix Series.

== Track listing ==
1. Filthy Dukes - This Rhythm (Emperor Machine Remix) - Fiction
2. Phenomenal Handclap Band - You'll Disappear - Tummy Touch
3. WhoMadeWho - The Plot (Discodeine Remix) - Gomma
4. Hockey - Learn to Lose (Filthy Dukes Remix) - Capitol
5. Sparks - Beat the Clock - Sparks/Giorgio Moroder Enterprise
6. Alan Braxe & Fred Falke - Most Wanted - Vulture
7. Sébastien Tellier - Kilometer (Aeroplane Mix) - Lucky Number
8. 80kidz - Miss Mars - KSR Corp
9. Filthy Dukes - Twenty Six Hundred (Album Version) - Fiction
10. POPOF - Serenity (Noob remix) - Form Music
11. Audio Soul Project - Reality Check (Vincenzo Remix) - Dessous
12. Mujava - Township Funk - This is Music
13. Dataworx - Control (Original Mix) - Solarscape
14. Noob & Brodinski - Peanuts Club - Turbo
15. Joakim - Watermelon Bubblicious - Versatile
16. Zombie Nation - Worth It, Part 1 - UKW Records
17. Aphex Twin - Windowlicker - Warp
18. Tiga - What You Need (Proxy Remix) - Different Recordings
19. Daft Punk - Robot Rock (Soulwax Remix) - Virgin
20. Mr Oizo - Pourriture 7 - Ed Banger
21. Jack Peñate - Tonight's Today - XL Recordings
22. Lifelike - Sequencer - Vulture
23. Filthy Dukes - Messages (Filthy Dukes Kill Em All Remix) - Fiction
