= Summer Palace (album) =

Studio album by Sunny Day Sets Fire
- Released: 8 July 2008
- Genre: indie pop
- Length: 58:53
- Label: IAMSOUND Records (US) Wonderboat Recordings (UK)
- Producers: Sunny Day Sets Fire (additional production and mixing by Peter Katis)

Summer Palace is the first full-length album by UK indie pop band Sunny Day Sets Fire. It was released in the US in 2008 by Iamsound, and in 2009 by UK label Wonderboat.

Eric Harvey of Pitchfork rated the album a 6.8 out of 10, writing that it "shows that Sunny Day Sets Fire know their emotional and sonic niches well."

== Track listing ==
No.	Title	Length
1.	"Wilderness"	3:23
2.	"Stranger"	4:45
3.	"Teenagers Talking"	4:03
4.	"End of the Road"	4:41
5.	"All Our Songs"	4:29
6.	"Smallest Heart on Earth"	6:15
7.	"Mandarins"	5:04
8.	"Siamese"	2:46
9.	"I Dream Along"	4:16
10.	"Adrenaline"	3:24
11.	"Hollywood"	4:04
12.	"Brainless"	3:25
13.	"Map of the World"	2:20
14.	"Lack of View"	5:59
