= Signs (Bloc Party song) =

2009 single by Bloc Party

"Signs (Armand Van Helden Remix)"

Single by Bloc Party

from the album Intimacy Remixed
- Released: 27 April 2009
- Recorded: 2008
- Genre: Alternative dance, electro house, dream pop
- Length: 5:48
- Label: Wichita
- Songwriter(s): Russell Lissack, Kele Okereke
- Producer(s): Jacknife Lee & Armand Van Helden

Bloc Party singles chronology
"One Month Off" (2009)	"Signs (Armand Van Helden Remix)" (2009)	"One More Chance" (2009)

"Signs" is the first single from Intimacy Remixed, the remix album to Bloc Party's third album Intimacy. The song's remix by Armand Van Helden was released on 27 April 2009 in the United Kingdom only on digital download and 12" vinyl. It is the first single to be released from a Bloc Party remix album as no songs were released from the previous effort Silent Alarm Remixed.

== Musical style ==
Paul Cook of godisinthetvzine.co.uk stated that the remixed version of "Signs" does "away with the xylophone intro and delicate layering of vocals and instrumentals" of the original version by "wedging in a thick, house bassline. Cook also commented that this change "hasn't done this track any favours" and that the song "is far from inventive or experimental in its production". Simon Taylor of angryape.com offered a differing opinion, stating that "Helden rips up the dancefloor with his rework - all grinding synths, bouncy basslines and booming beats" to create a remix that "will appeal to clubbers and indie fans in equal measure", evoking the success of one Bloc Party's earlier singles, "Banquet".

== Music video ==
The music video features "maligned individuals with volume knobs for eyes, equalizer LEDs for spines, and cable input/outputs for faces" as well as a "barrage of seemingly random and disturbing images [including] a talking vagina". Filter described the video as "what a sexually repressed sound engineer's nightmare might look like", concluding that "all that being said, the rifle-quick imagery is suiting for the pace and rhythm of the song, emphasized by house music maestro Armand Van Helden who remixes the track".

The video was directed by Hiro Murai, and David Knight of promonews.tv commented that his "inventive graftings of bodies and machines" seem to be "somewhat influenced by the Aphex-Cunningham school of body-horror". Knight ultimately described the video as "stunning", with similar positive comments from Peter Gaston of Spin who stated that it was "completely gripping". In addition, Gaston claimed that the video "ranks up there with dance music's best videos, like Aphex Twin's "Come to Daddy"".

== Track listing ==
Digital download

1. "Signs" (Armand Van Helden Remix) – 5:48

12" vinyl

1. "Signs" (Armand Van Helden Remix) – 5:48
2. "Signs" (Armand Van Helden Remix Instrumental) – 5:33
3. "Signs" (Pantha Du Prince Remix) - 8:45

Promo CD

1. "Signs" (Armand Van Helden Remix Edit) – 3:18
2. "Signs" (John King Remix) - 4:01
3. "Signs" (Intimacy version) – 4:39

== Charts ==
Chart (2008)	Peak position
UK Singles Chart	115
