= Permanent Signal (album) =

Studio album by Porcelain Raft
- Released: August 20, 2013
- Genre: Rock
- Length: 40:25
- Label: Secretly Canadian

Porcelain Raft chronology
Strange Weekend (2012)	Permanent Signal (2013)	Microclimate (2017)

Singles from Permanent Signal
- 1. "The Way Out" Released: July 2013

Professional ratings
Aggregate scores
Source	Rating
Metacritic	70/100
Review scores
Source	Rating
Allmusic	3.5/5 stars
This Is Fake DIY	8/10

Permanent Signal is the second studio album by American musician Porcelain Raft. It was released in August 2013 under Secretly Canadian.

Permanent Signal was recorded at the end of 2012 with all new equipment and help from Jonny Rogoff (Yuck) on drums, Darby Cicci (Antlers) on bass and Gaspar Claus (collaborator of Sufjan Stevens and The National) on cello. The title is meant to evoke a sense of loneliness through the symbolism of a phone-line without connection. Remiddi articulated feelings of disconnectedness when discussing the record and life on-tour. "In a way, growing up in Italy, then living for 12 years in London, and now two and a half years in New York, made me realize that I have some dear friends I rarely see," explains Remiddi. "I was touring almost non-stop for eight months and I started having these imaginary conversations in my head with people I wanted to communicate with, but for one reason or another it couldn't happen. This is where the album title came from: the idea of a signal that says the line is off."

== Track listing ==
No.	Title	Length
1.	"Think of the Ocean"	4:03
2.	"Cluster"	3:58
3.	"Minor Pleasure"	4:28
4.	"Open Letter"	1:02
5.	"Night Birds"	4:19
6.	"It Ain't Over"	3:08
7.	"I Lost Connection"	5:47
8.	"Warehouse"	2:00
9.	"The Way Out"	3:49
10.	"Five Minutes From Now"	3:55
11.	"Echo"	3:56
