= Harlem Shake (song) =

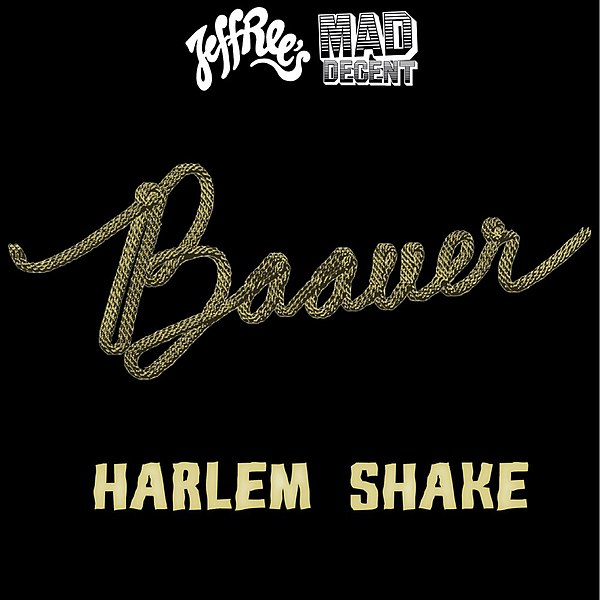

Single by Baauer
- Language: Spanish; English
- Released: May 22, 2012
- Recorded: 2012
- Studio: Brooklyn, New York
- Genre: Bass; hip-hop; EDM trap
- Length: 3:16
- Label: Jeffree's; Mad Decent
- Songwriters: Harry Rodriques; Héctor Delgado; Jayson Musson; Kurt Hunte
- Producer: Baauer

Baauer singles chronology
"Harlem Shake" (2012)	"Dum Dum" (2012)

Audio video
- "Harlem Shake" on YouTube

"Harlem Shake" is a song recorded by American DJ and producer Baauer. It was released as his debut single on May 22, 2012, by Mad Decent imprint label Jeffree's. The uptempo song—variously described as trap, hip-hop or bass music—incorporates a mechanical bassline, Dutch house synth riffs, a dance music drop, and samples of growling-lion sounds. It also samples Plastic Little's 2001 song "Miller Time", specifically the vocal "then do the Harlem shake", which is an allusion to the dance of the same name. Baauer added a variety of peculiar sounds to the song so that it would stand out.

The single did not begin to sell significantly until February 2013, when a YouTube video set to its music developed into an Internet meme of the same name. The media response to the meme helped increase the single's sales, as it charted at number one for five consecutive weeks on the US Billboard Hot 100. It also reached number three in the United Kingdom and number one in both Australia and New Zealand. During the song's chart run, Billboard enacted a policy that included video streams as a component of their charts.

"Harlem Shake" was well received by music critics, who viewed it as an appealing dance track, although some felt that it was more of a novelty song. After the song became a hit, Mad Decent label head Diplo reached an agreement with the artists of the song's samples, which had not been contractually cleared before its release. However, according to Baauer, he has not received any of the money the song made because of the legal issues from not having properly cleared the samples. American rapper Azealia Banks released a remix to "Harlem Shake" on her SoundCloud page, which was subsequently removed at Baauer's request and led to a dispute between the two.

== Background ==
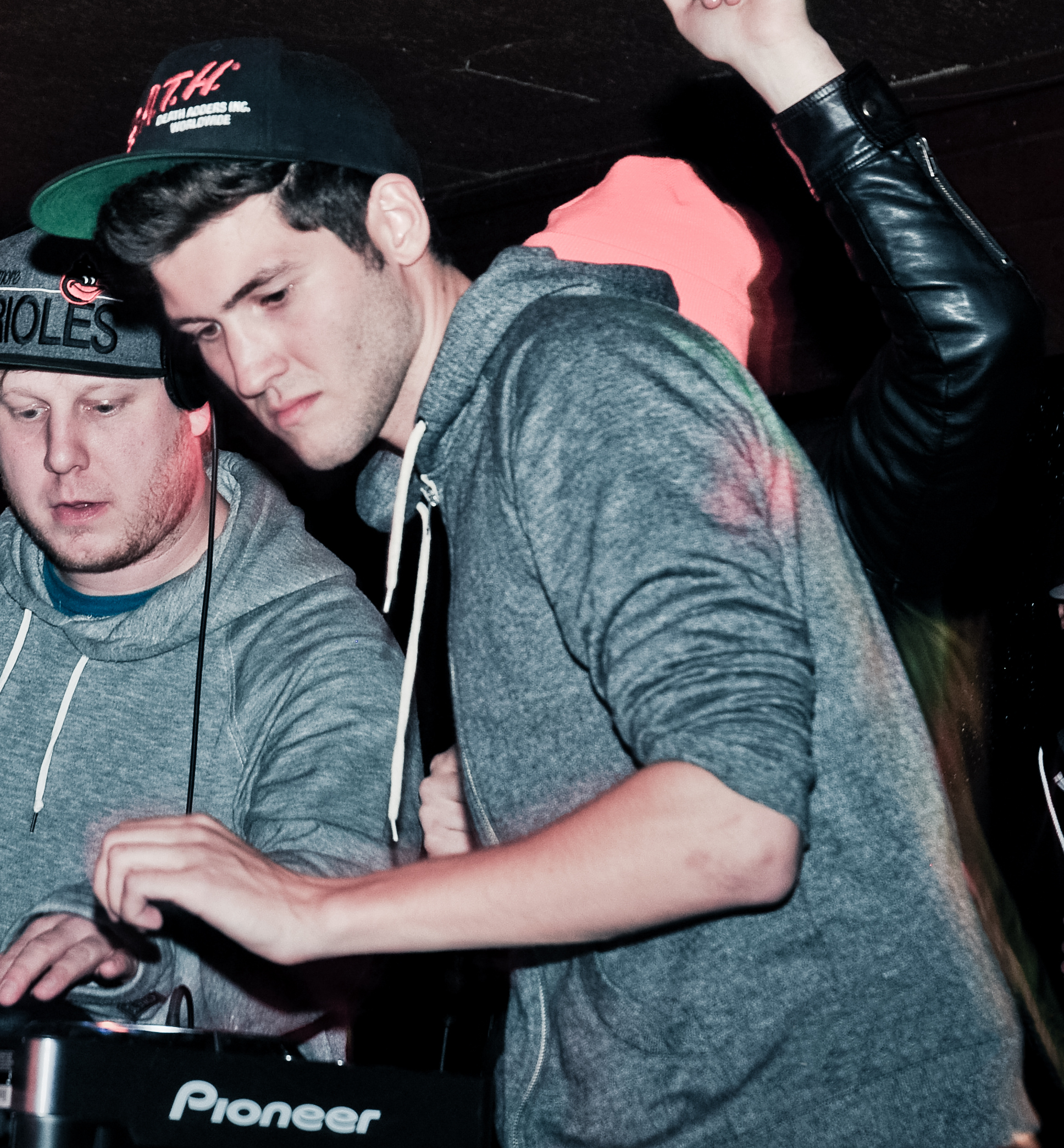
Baauer (right) in 2012

In 2011, Baauer rededicated himself to music after studying at City College and began to practice making beats. He recorded "Harlem Shake" in 2012 in his bedroom studio in Brooklyn, New York. With the song, he wanted to record a high-pitched, Dutch house synthesizer over a hip hop track and make it stand out by adding a variety of peculiar sounds. He later referred to it as "a goofy, fun song". Baauer posted "Harlem Shake", along with several of his other recordings, on his SoundCloud page, and in April, Scottish DJ Rustie featured the song in his Essential Mix for BBC Radio 1. Record producer and Mad Decent label head Diplo heard the song, and released it on May 22 as a free digital download through Mad Decent's imprint label Jeffree's. It was Baauer's debut single.

== Music and lyrics ==
"Harlem Shake"
A 19-second sample of the song

"Harlem Shake" features harsh snares, a mechanical bassline, samples of growling lions, and Dutch house synth riffs. It has a high tempo characteristic of hip hop and a dance music drop. According to Andrew Ryce from Resident Advisor, "Harlem Shake" is a hip hop and bass song, while both David Wagner of The Atlantic and Khal from Complex described it as trap, a musical subgenre with stylistic origins in EDM and Southern hip hop, featuring Roland TR-808 beats and drops. Ryce felt the song's music "represents the hip-hop contingent of" bass music, which is typified by rolling snares and jerky basslines, finding it "particularly symptomatic of a growing strain of music obsessed with 'trap'". By contrast, Jon Caramanica from The New York Times argued that it "isn't a hip-hop song, but it is hip-hop-influenced."

"Harlem Shake" begins with a sample of a voice shouting "con los terroristas", a Spanish phrase which translates to "with the terrorists" in English. Although listeners assumed it was a female voice, the sample was taken from a remix of the 2006 reggaeton single "Maldades" by Héctor El Father from his album The Bad Boy, who often used the line as a refrain on his other songs, such as the intro of the 2007 reggaeton album "Los Capo", which featured artists such as Jowell & Randy. In 2010, the recorded phrase was used by Philadelphia DJs Skinny Friedman and DJ Apt One, on a remix of Gregor Salto's dance track "Con Alegría". Baauer said he found the vocal sample from an unidentified source on the Internet. The sampled voice is followed by building synths and snares, and a syncopated sub-bass sound before another voice commands listeners to "do the Harlem shake". The line was sampled from Plastic Little's 2001 hip hop song "Miller Time", which Baauer sampled after having a friend play it for him and "[getting it] stuck in my head for a while". Plastic Little member Jayson Musson said his line was inspired by a fist-fight that he ended by performing the harlem shake dance move: "This was my first fight and I didn’t know how to properly 'end' a fight, so I just smiled at him and did the Harlem shake, blood gushing from glass cuts on my face. The other kid, I guess not wanting to fight anymore, or maybe not wanting to fight someone who just danced at him, got on his skateboard and took off without his shoes."

== Commercial performance ==
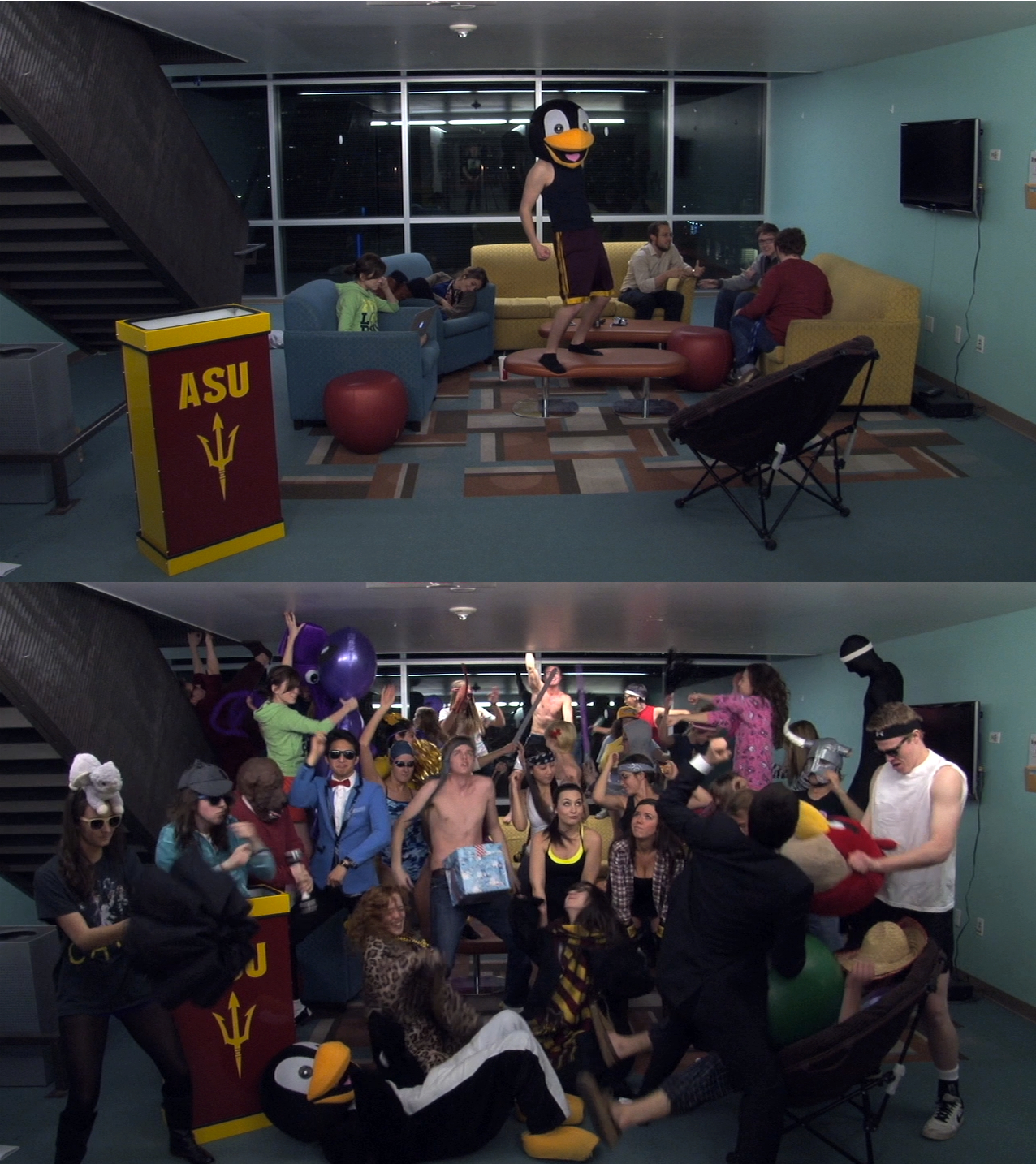
Screenshots from one of numerous videos from the Harlem Shake meme, which skyrocketed the song's sales and streams

"Harlem Shake" was released commercially in June 2012. Mad Decent commissioned a music video for the single at the time, but were not satisfied with the result and shelved it. It gradually received listens online, and was re-released as a single on January 8, 2013. However, it did not begin to sell significantly until February, when a YouTube video, uploaded by Filthy Frank and featuring the song, developed into an Internet meme of the same name. The 30-second video showed people dancing to the song and was parodied more than 3,000 times in other user-submitted videos. Billboard magazine cited "Harlem Shake" as "the biggest viral sensation since PSY's 'Gangnam Style'". Baauer and Mad Decent generated income from both the user-submitted videos and Baauer's original audio post on YouTube because of the site's Content ID service, which allows artists, labels, and publishers to monetize songs. According to MSN Money, they earned $6 for every 1,000 views of the video.

The late-week media response to the meme helped the single sell 12,000 units on iTunes in the week ending February 10, according to Nielsen SoundScan. It consequently entered the US Dance/Electronic Digital Songs at number nine and the Dance/Electronic Songs at number twelve. Mad Decent's manager Jasper Goggins said that "Harlem Shake" was the "biggest thing" they have released, "and it's happened within six days." In the United Kingdom, "Harlem Shake" reached number twenty-two on the UK Singles Chart during the week of the meme's phenomena. By the end of the chart week, the single had climbed nineteen spots to number three. Martin Talbot, the Official Charts Company's managing director, said that the single's climb on the chart "underlines just how quickly this track has turned into a bone fide phenomenon. At the start of the week, it wasn't even selling enough to make the Top 20—but it is now one of the UK's most popular tracks."

The following week, "Harlem Shake" debuted at number one on the US Billboard Hot 100 and climbed to number one on the Dance/Electronic Songs, while selling 262,000 units. It was the first instrumental track to top the Hot 100 since Jan Hammer's 1985 Miami Vice theme. It was also the twenty-first song in the Hot 100's history to debut at number one and was aided by 103 million weekly video streams, which was announced that week by Billboard and Nielsen SoundScan as a new component of their charts. According to Billboard's editorial director Bill Werde, "Harlem Shake"'s success prompted them to enact the chart policy after two years of discussions with YouTube. However, Silvio Pietroluongo, the magazine's director of charts, said in an interview for The A.V. Club that their timing was coincidental and came after a period of negotiating the chart policy and its logistics. However, because it lacked major label promotional support, the single registered low in airplay. It also debuted at number one on the ARIA Singles Chart and became 1000th number-one song since Australia began compiling charts in 1940.

"Harlem Shake" remained at number one on the Hot 100 in its second week, when it sold 297,000 digital units. It also received more airplay after being promoted to radio by Warner Bros. Records, who had agreed to a deal with Mad Decent on February 26 to distribute the song worldwide. "Harlem Shake" topped the Hot 100 for a third week and sold 228,000 units, despite a decline in YouTube streams. By March 10, it had reached sales of one million digital units. On March 12, Sean Michaels of The Guardian reported that the song had earned more than £50,000 from YouTube. "Harlem Shake" remained at number one for five consecutive weeks on the Hot 100.

== Copyright infringement ==
The tale of how an obscure dance track containing possible copyright violations rose to the top of pop charts illustrates not only the free-for-all nature of underground dance music but also the power of an Internet fad to create a sudden hit outside the major-label system.

— James C. McKinley Jr.

Neither vocal sample used on "Harlem Shake" was contractually cleared with Héctor Delgado or Jayson Musson, who were both shocked to hear the song after it became a hit. In February, Delgado was told by his former manager Javier Gómez that he heard his voice on the song and wanted to take legal action. According to Gómez, Diplo subsequently called Delgado and told him that he was unaware "Harlem Shake" sampled his voice when it was released as a single. Gómez called "Harlem Shake" "a clear breaking of intellectual property rights" and said that since Diplo's call, lawyers for Machete Music have been negotiating with Mad Decent over compensation for the sample.

Musson received an enthusiastic call in late February from a past member of Plastic Little telling him that his voice was sampled on "Harlem Shake". Musson did not have a problem with Baauer using the sample without his permission and found the song's production "phenomenal". He subsequently called Baauer to thank him for "doing something useful with our annoying music". However, he felt that the allusion to the dance was "peculiar" and outdated: "I was like, Who the fuck is rapping about the Harlem Shake in 2012?" Musson said in an interview in March that he and Mad Decent were in negotiations regarding compensation, and that the label had been "more than cooperative during this".

In April, Diplo told The Huffington Post that he had reached an agreement to clear the samples. However, in an August interview with Pitchfork, Baauer said that he has not made any money from the song, despite Diplo's reported agreement: "I'm meeting with my lawyer ... so I'm gonna find that out. I think it's mostly because of all the legal shit. I didn't clear the samples because I was in my fucking bedroom on Grand Street. I wasn't going to think to call up [Delgado], I didn't even know who it was who did that [sample]; I knew the Jayson Musson [sample]. So I found myself in that fucking pickle. Legal letters and shit. Ugh. Lawyers. So exposure-wise it was fantastic, but everything else..."

== Critical reception ==
Pitchfork journalist Larry Fitzmaurice labelled the song "Best New Track" upon its release in May 2012 and called it a "disorienting banger" with an "irresistible appeal" that "owes almost everything" to its "menacing, world-smashing bassline". Fitzmaurice wrote in conclusion, "Along with this purely visceral pleasure, it's hard not to marvel at how awesome those growling-lion samples sound." Randall Roberts of the Los Angeles Times said that he liked the song and viewed it as a "syrupy instrumental" that foreshadows "the convergence of hip-hop, dance and rock".

Andrew Ryce of Resident Advisor gave "Harlem Shake" a rating of three-and-a-half out of five and found its musical climax "admittedly satisfying—that is, until it resumes flailing like a novelty track", writing that "it's not hard to see why the track is well-liked, but its snowballing ubiquity is a bit of a head-scratcher, simply because it's not all that interesting." Similarly, Jon Caramanica of The New York Times said that, after hearing a minute of it being played during Power 105.1 FM's mixshow, the song "felt more like a novelty than like part of a strategy." Caramanica felt that its success, along with that of Macklemore's 2012 song "Thrift Shop", reflects a "centerless future" for hip hop and stated, "Depending on your lens, this reflects a tremendous cultural victory for hip-hop or the moment when hip-hop, as a construct, begins to lose meaning."

== Remixes ==
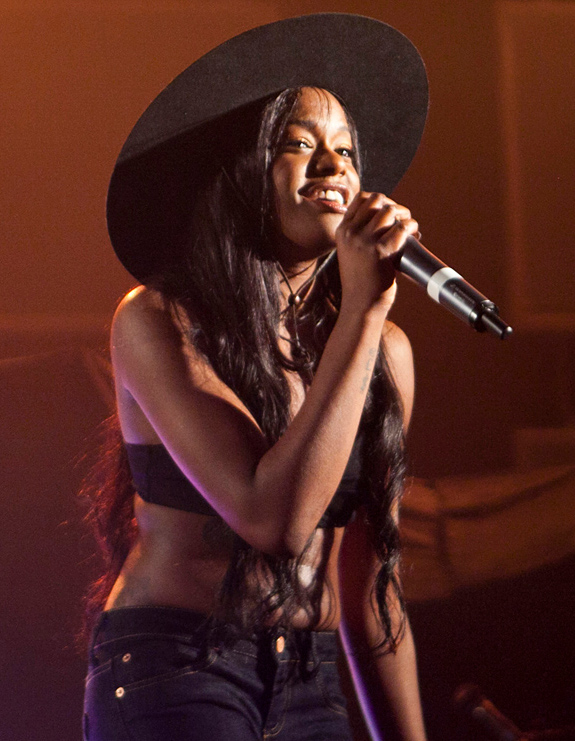
Azealia Banks (2012), one of several rappers who remixed the song

On February 14, 2013, American rapper Azealia Banks released a remix to "Harlem Shake" on SoundCloud, which was then removed at Baauer's request. Banks disparaged Baauer on Twitter in response and claimed to have e-mails sent from him giving her permission to use the song. She then said that Diplo had sent her an e-mail telling her that the remix was removed because they would rather have rapper Juicy J on it. On February 16, Banks shared a music video for her remix on Vimeo, and revealed a purported e-mail from Baauer saying he liked the remix. Baauer responded in an interview for The Daily Beast, saying that they had planned to release a version of the song with Banks, but felt that her verse did not meet their expectations:

She laid something on 'Harlem Shake' and it was so/so. Didn't love it. And that was a little while ago, and since all this video stuff happened, our plans all changed. Because of that, we decided to just release the song on its own with no vocal version. So we told her, 'Please don't release your version.' And she said, 'Well, I'm going to put it online anyway.' And we said, 'Please don't. We'd really like it if you didn't.' And she did.

Jon Caramanica of The New York Times cited Banks' remix as one of her best songs, while Chris Martins of Spin wrote that she delivers "fire-hot verse after fire-hot verse" and facetiously remarked that "Banks raps all over your dumb 'Harlem Shake' meme".

Pitbull and Jim Jones also recorded freestyle raps over the song. After releasing his version, Jones claimed in an interview that "Harlem Shake" was a song he originally recorded one year ago for an album by Pauly D, but that they ultimately scrapped it: "When I started to hear the 'Harlem Shake' and heard the beat, I was like damn, I had the record for a year. So I just put the record out."

== Track listing ==
Digital download

1. "Harlem Shake" – 3:16
2. "Yaow!" – 2:11

== Charts ==
=== Weekly charts ===
Chart (2013)	Peak position
Australia (ARIA)	1
Austria (Ö3 Austria Top 40)	9
Belgium (Ultratop 50 Flanders)	2
Belgium (Ultratop 50 Wallonia)	2
Brazil (Brasil Hot 100)	1
Canada (Canadian Hot 100)	6
Denmark (Tracklisten)	4
Euro Digital Song Sales (Billboard)	3
Finland (Suomen virallinen lista)	19
France (SNEP)	4
Germany (GfK)	10
Greece Digital Songs (Billboard)	1
Ireland (IRMA)	5
Italy (FIMI)	9
Luxembourg Digital Songs (Billboard)	1
Netherlands (Dutch Top 40)	4
Netherlands (Single Top 100)	4
New Zealand (Recorded Music NZ)	1
Norway (VG-lista)	9
Poland Dance (ZPAV)	21
Portugal (Billboard)	3
Scottish Singles Sales (Official Charts)	3
South Korean International Singles (GAON)	2
Spain (Promusicae)	24
Sweden (Sverigetopplistan)	17
Switzerland (Schweizer Hitparade)	5
UK Singles (Official Charts)	3
UK Dance (Official Charts)	1
UK Indie (Official Charts)	2
US Billboard Hot 100	1
US Dance/Electronic Songs (Billboard)	1
US Hot Dance Club Songs (Billboard)	28
US Mainstream Top 40 (Billboard)	38

=== Year-end charts ===
Chart (2013)	Position
Australia (ARIA)	61
Belgium (Ultratop 50 Flanders)	49
Belgium (Ultratop Flanders Dance)	36
Belgium (Ultratop 50 Wallonia)	31
Belgium (Ultratop Wallonia Dance)	66
Canada (Canadian Hot 100)	93
Italy (FIMI)	85
Netherlands (Dutch Top 40)	76
Netherlands (Single Top 100)	84
New Zealand (Recorded Music NZ)	50
UK Singles (Official Charts Company)	72
US Billboard Hot 100	4
US Hot Dance/Electronic Songs (Billboard)	1

=== Decade-end charts ===
Chart (2010–2019)	Position
US Hot Dance/Electronic Songs (Billboard)	47

== Certifications ==
Region	Certification	Certified units/sales
Australia (ARIA)	2× Platinum	140,000^{^}
Belgium (BRMA)	Gold	15,000^{*}
New Zealand (RMNZ)	Platinum	15,000^{*}
United Kingdom (BPI)	Silver	200,000^{*}
United States (RIAA)	2× Platinum	2,000,000^{‡}
^{*} Sales figures based on certification alone.^{^} Shipments figures based on certification alone.^{‡} Sales+streaming figures based on certification alone.

== Release history ==
Date	Format	Label	Catalog
May 22, 2012	Free digital download	Jeffree's	JEFF016
January 8, 2013	iTunes download	Mad Decent	—

== See also ==
- List of Hot 100 number-one singles of 2013 (U.S.)
- List of number-one Dance/Electronic Songs of 2013 (U.S.)
- List of number-one singles of 2013 (Australia)
- List of UK top 10 singles in 2013
