= Sunny Day Sets Fire =

UK musical group

- Origin: London
- Genres: Indie pop
- Years active: 2005–2009
- Labels: IAMSOUND Records (USA); Wonderboat (UK), Brikabrak (UK)
- Past members: Mauro Remiddi; Onyee Lo; Max Zoccheddu; Ed Howat; Matthew Parker
- Website: sunnydaysetsfire.com

Sunny Day Sets Fire were an indie psychedelic pop quintet from London. Although formed in London, the members come from different backgrounds such as Hong Kong, Italy, Canada and the UK.

== History ==
The band was formed in London in 2005 by the Italian-born Mauro Remiddi and Hong Kong-born Onyee Lo, who met while working at an art-house cinema in Chelsea. The band's name was, according to the band themselves, suggested by an Internet band name generator.

They initially worked as a duo but their first demo was recorded as a trio with guitarist Max Zoccheddu. As a three piece they released their first ltd. ed. 7" Brainless/Nations Underground for Bikabrak Rec. and played their initial handful of shows in London. One year later they started expanding their line-up, first with bassist Ed Howat (with whom they recorded the second single Wilderness) and then with drummer Matthew Parker.

In early 2008, their US label, Iamsound, issued a remix EP featuring remixes of "Stranger", "Brainless", "Wilderness", and "Adrenaline" by CSS, XXXChange from Spank Rock, The Cool Kids, Baron von Luxxury, The Slips, and Mad Decent/Diplo.

Their debut album, Summer Palace, recorded and produced by the band itself, and mixed by Peter Katis (Interpol, Mercury Rev, Spoon, The National) was released in US by Iamsound in July 2008, and in the UK by Wonderboat Rec. in February 2009. It garnered good reviews from the major UK magazines, NME, Uncut and Clash, The A.V. Club, and the web-zines Pitchfork Media and Drowned in Sound.

"Adrenaline", the first single issued from the album, was named "single of the week" by Steve Lamacq on BBC 6 Music. The song "Lack of View", from Summer Palace, was featured on the soundtrack of the film American Teen.

The band split up in 2009 with Remiddi going on to work as a solo artist under the name Porcelain Raft.

Matthew Parker is currently working on his own project Piano Rach, while Max Zoccheddu plays now with Diagrams (band).

== Musical style and influences ==
The band cited their influences as Wizard of Oz, Gummo, The Beatles and The Velvet Underground. Their sound has been described as "a wild and volatile flood of gorgeous, exuberant pop". Their sound is generally classed as indie pop.

== Members ==
- Mauro Remiddi (vocals, guitar, drums)
- Onyee Lo (vocals, synths, percussion, drums)
- Max Zoccheddu (guitar, baritone guitar)
- Ed Howat (bass, synth)
- Matthew (drums, keys)

== Discography ==
=== Albums ===
- Summer Palace (2008), Iamsound (US) – issued in the UK (2009), Wonderboat

=== EPs ===
- Brainless EP (2006), Iamsound (US) – issued in Australia (2007), Etch'n'Sketch
- Stranger/Remix EP (2008), Iamsound (US)

=== Singles ===
- "Brainless" 7" (2006), Brikabrak (UK)
- "Wilderness" 7" (2006), Wi45 (UK)
- "End of the Road" 7" (2008), Brikabrak (UK)
