= Talons (song) =

Single by Bloc Party

from the album Intimacy
- Released: 20 October 2008
- Recorded: 2008
- Genre: Indie rock, alternative dance, breakbeat, electronic rock
- Length: 4:43
- Label: Wichita
- Songwriters: Kele Okereke, Russell Lissack, Gordon Moakes, Matt Tong
- Producer: Paul Epworth

Bloc Party singles chronology
"Mercury" (2008)	"Talons" (2008)	"One Month Off" (2009)

"Talons" is the second single released by Bloc Party from their third album, Intimacy. It was announced on 8 September 2008 that the song would be released as a digital download to all those who had purchased the mp3 version of the band's album. The download was made available straight after the song's first play on Zane Lowe's BBC Radio 1 show on 9 September 2008. The song was physically released on 20 October 2008, one week prior to the album's full release. The song itself did not feature on the original download-only album, but appeared on the physical release and was also made available for free to those who had downloaded the original album. The original downloadable album had included a gap in the track list with track 9 missing (people could see this on iTunes by right clicking on the songs the "get info" option. It peaked at number 39 on the UK Singles Chart. It is featured in the video game Colin McRae: DiRT 2

Talking about "Talons" on Bloc Party's official website, singer Kele Okereke said:

We wanted to keep things fresh and we thought the fans would be more excited to get a new song rather than something off the album. Talons is one of the last songs we recorded during the Intimacy sessions and I always had it in mind to be one of the extra tracks we promised for the CD if it turned out well. It turned out great so we decided to make it the next single. I'm enjoying this way of working, not over-thinking things, just make a decision and get on with it! It's quite liberating in a way, I'm sure it's going to be the way things happen more and more in the future

== Track listing ==
- CD
1. Talons
2. Talons (Phones R.I.P mix)
3. Talons (XXXChange remix)
4. Talons (Moody Boyz remix)
- 7"
1. Talons (acoustic)
2. Talons (Gordy mix)
- 7"
1. Talons
2. Talons (Phones R.I.P mix)

== Charts ==
Chart performance for "Talons"
Chart (2008)	Peak position
Austria (Ö3 Austria Top 40)	67
Belgium (Ultratip Bubbling Under Flanders)	5
Belgium (Ultratip Bubbling Under Wallonia)	21
Scottish Singles Sales (Official Charts)	15
UK Singles (Official Charts)	39
