= One Month Off =

2009 single by Bloc Party

Single by Bloc Party

from the album Intimacy
- Released: 26 January 2009
- Length: 3:38
- Label: Wichita
- Songwriters: Russell Lissack, Gordon Moakes, Kele Okereke, Matt Tong
- Producer: Paul Epworth

Bloc Party singles chronology
"Talons" (2008)	"One Month Off" (2009)	""Signs" (Armand Van Helden Remix)" (2009)

"One Month Off" is the third single from Bloc Party's third album, Intimacy. It was released on 26 January 2009 on 7-inch vinyl and digital download.

The music video was made by Team D.A.D.D.Y and features footage from Ray Harryhausen's fairy tale stop motion films, augmented by CGI scenes of war. The band does not appear in the music video.

The song was popular on alternative-formatted radio stations in the United States and peaked at number 49 on the Mediabase alternative chart. However, the release charted lower in the UK than any other Bloc Party single, at #170.

== Track listing ==
Limited 7" single

1. "One Month Off" – 3:38
2. "One Month Off (Findo Gask Cruel And Unusual 7-inch Mix)"

Digital EP

1. "One Month Off" – 3:38
2. "One Month Off (Restyled By Camp America)" – 3:36
3. "One Month Off (Filthy Dukes Remix - Vocal)" – 5:47
4. "One Month Off (Findo Gask Cruel And Unusual Mix)" – 6:15
5. "One Month Off (Metal on Metal Remake)" – 6:53

== Charts ==
Chart (2008)	Peak position
UK Singles Chart	170
