= TooTurntTony =

American social media personality (born 1995)

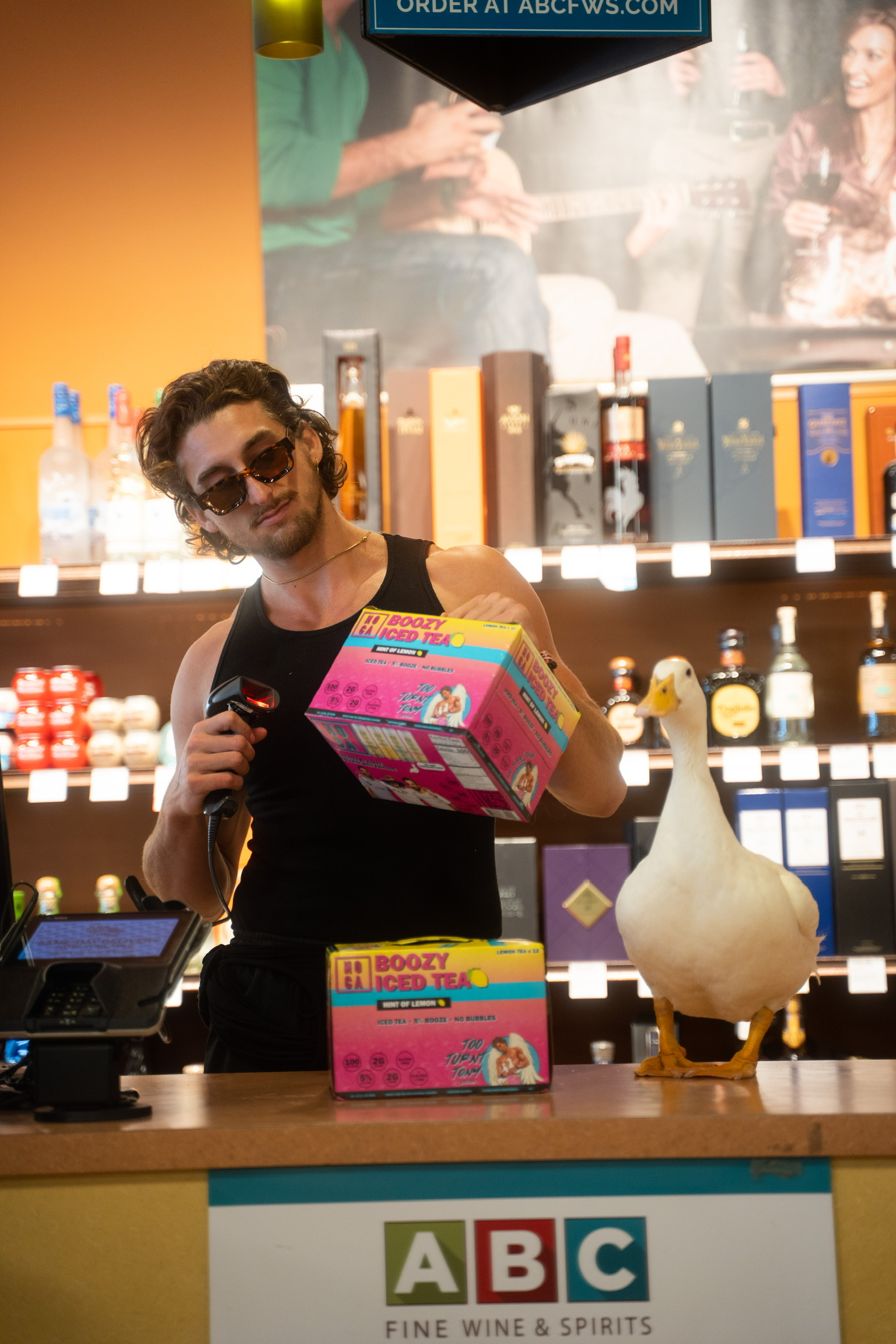
- Dawson in 2023
- Born: Anthony Michael Dawson; February 1, 1995 (age 31); Commerce, Michigan, U.S.
- Education: Western Michigan University
- Occupation: Social media personality
- Years active: 2020–present
- Known for: TikTok (previously known as musical.ly), and YouTube

TikTok information
- Page: tooturnttony
- Followers: 20.5 million

YouTube information
- Channel: TooTurntTony
- Subscribers: 6.94 million
- Views: 6.1 billion
- Last updated: May 11, 2025
- Website: Official website

Anthony Dawson (born Feb 1, 1995), better known as TooTurntTony or "Duck Daddy", is an American social media personality, model, and wildlife conservation advocate. He is known for creating viral comedy skits, social experiments, and other videos often involving his family and domestic ducks.

== Social media career ==
Dawson began his career as a duck-rancher, where he would make role-playing videos with ducks in efforts to increase awareness of wetland conservation. Later, he began incorporating various family members such as his mother, father, and sister (later collectively dubbed the "TooTurntFamily") into social experiments and other comedic content.

Dawson was named a Top 50 Creator of 2023 by Forbes. At that time, Dawson had 25 million followers total from TikTok, YouTube, and OnlyFans and estimated annual earnings of $2.9 million. By August 2024, Dawson had more than 20 million followers on TikTok alone. His skits and other content have appeared on media outlets such as Univision, Business Insider, and USA Today. Among the most notable videos is a series related to Jeffrey Dahmer, which amassed over 50 million views. In November 2024, Dawson saved one of his friends from an alligator attack, garnering attention of the media.

Tony is signed to Creative Artists Agency for representation in all categories.

== Other ventures ==
In 2023, Dawson released an alcoholic iced tea known as "Too Turnt Tea" in collaboration with NOCA Beverages. He sold more than a million 12-packs in the first year. Dawson played a lead character in the 2025 horror film, Skinwalker Island, which takes place in Florida.
