= Harlem shake (dance) =

Hip-hop dance

The Harlem shake is a style of hip-hop dance characterized by jerky arm and shoulder movements in time to music. The dance was created in 1981 and first known as "The Albee", after its creator. As indicated by the name, it is associated with the predominantly African American neighborhood of Harlem, in New York City. The dance became known as the Harlem Shake as its prominence grew beyond the neighborhood. In 2001 G. Dep's music video for the song "Let's Get It" introduced the dance to the mainstream.

== History ==
The dance was created by Al B. who was known for performing it during breaks at the Entertainer's Basketball Classic basketball tournament at Rucker Park. Harlem resident Al B. (also known as Ali Saadat and Al Cisco), whose legal name was Albert Leopold Boyce, died in 2006 at the age of 43. The dance was first called "The Albee" after its creator and later became known as the Harlem Shake when it became popular outside of the neighborhood. The dance was then popularised by four man dance crew Crazy Boyz (members Maurice "Motion" Strayhorn, Jesse "Smiley" Rutland, (Note: One of the co-founders of the dance, Jesse "Smiley" Rutland, was murdered by gunshot in his home on December 10, 2017. The suspect, Kumar Reid, was charged by police with second-degree murder and weapons possession.) Kirkland "Dirty Kirt" Young and Joseph "No Bones" Collins).

Sources differ in identifying the inspiration for the dance - some say it is based on an Ethiopian dance Eskista and others that it was inspired by the dance moves of the creator's mother Sandra Boyce.

In 2003 interview Al B. said that the dance is "It's a drunken shake anyway, it's an alcoholic shake, but it's fantastic, everybody loves it and everybody appreciates it. And it's glowing with glory. And it's respected." According to Al. B. the dance came from the ancient Egyptians and describes it as what the mummies used to do. Because they were all wrapped up, they couldn't really move, all they could do was shake.

== In African-American culture ==
The Harlem Shake became mainstream in 2001 with the release of the music video for "Let's Get It" by G. Dep. The video featured children performing the dance. The dance became popular in hip-hop music videos of the era especially with artists from Harlem. Most notably it was a key feature in music videos for Jadakiss' "Put Your Hands Up and G.Dep's "Special Delivery", both released in 2001. The outro to Missy Elliott's 2002 hit "Work It" states "Yo, it's okay though, you know if you wanna be hard and ice-grilled, and Harlem Shake at the same time, whatever, let's just have fun." The Harlem Shake was also referenced in the lyrics to the song "Down and Out" by Harlem rapper Cam'ron.

The Harlem Shake is commonly associated with a similar dance move "The Chicken Noodle Soup". The "Chicken Noodle Soup" dance evolved from the Harlem Shake and exploded into popularity in the summer of 2006 when DJ Webstar and Young B brought it to the mainstream with the release of a song of the same name. The dance is referred to in the CunninLynguists song "Old School", in Mac Dre's "Thizzle Dance," and in Nelly's "Dilemma." A band from New York City took the name of the dance and dubbed themselves Harlem Shakes.

=== Reaction to the Harlem shake meme and song ===
In February 2013, a song named "Harlem Shake" (due to a sampled line referring to the Harlem Shake dance), originally released by Baauer in May 2012, went viral and became an Internet meme after featuring in a YouTube video by DizastaMusic, primarily known as Pink Guy or FilthyFrank at the time, who is now known as Joji. The dance that is done on the internet as a meme is not the Harlem Shake.
