= Anthony Dawson (physician) =

British gastroenterologist (1928–1997)

Sir Anthony Michael 'Tony' Dawson KCVO (8 May 1928 – 25 September 1997) was a British gastroenterologist. He was consultant physician at St Bartholomew's Hospital, London. He studied at King's College London in the Strand for his pre-clinical training, then for clinical work went to the old Charing Cross Hospital, qualifying in 1951.
