= Filthy Dukes =

English band

- Origin: London, England
- Genres: Synthpop, electronic rock
- Years active: 2005—present
- Label: Fiction
- Members: Olly Dixon; Tim Lawton; Mark Ralph
- Website: www.filthydukes.com www.myspace.com/filthydukes

Filthy Dukes are a synthpop band from London, England. The band is composed of Olly Dixon (sampling, electronic percussion, electric guitar), Tim Lawton (synthesisers, lead vocalist) and Mark Ralph (bass guitar, backing vocals). Having been active since 2005, the band released their debut single "Tupac Robot Club Rock" on Fiction Records. The track features vocals by Philadelphian rap group Plastic Little. Their debut album, Nonsense in the Dark, was released on Monday 16 March 2009 with the track Messages receiving a lot of airplay. It was later released as a single.

== Band history ==
The group began as Olly Dixon and Tim Lawton working together, where they promoted various club nights and DJ sets. They would go on to play supporting DJ sets for Mylo, Hot Chip and LCD Soundsystem, as well as release remixes of bands such as Late of the Pier, The Rakes and The Maccabees. Their music was described as "electroacidhousenuravetwisteddiscopunkfunk". The duo then joined together with long-term producer Mark Ralph to begin playing live. The band have their own resident DJ set, Kill Em All, which they have been playing for five years. It currently takes place at Fabric.

The band collaborated with Girls Aloud singer Sarah Harding on a track for the film Wild Child, released in August 2008. It is also set to appear on the film's soundtrack. The track sparked rumours that Harding would be leaving Girls Aloud to pursue a solo career, a rumour she later denied.

== Discography ==
=== Studio albums ===
- Nonsense in the Dark (March 24, 2009)

=== Compilations ===
- FabricLive.48 (2009)

=== Remixes ===
Artist	Title
Heloise & The Savoir Faire	"Illusions"
The Rakes	"22 Grand Job"
The Maccabees	"X Ray"
Filthy Dukes	"Tupac Robot Club Rock"
Filthy Dukes	"This Rhythm"
Late of the Pier	"Bathroom Gurgle"
Operahouse	"Change in Nature"
Kevin Rudolf	"Let It Rock"
Bloc Party	"One Month Off"
White Lies	"To Lose My Life"
Lady Gaga	"Paparazzi"
The Temper Trap	"Science of Fear"
