= Jessie Ware discography =

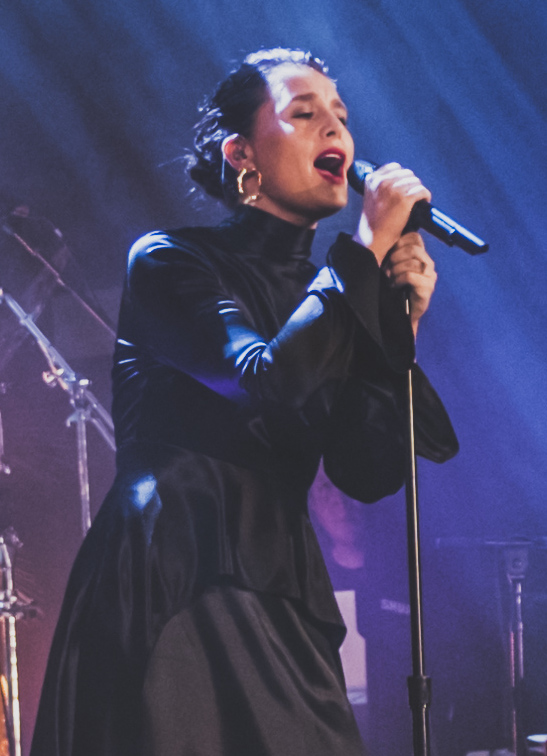
- Ware in 2017
- Studio albums: 6
- EPs: 4
- Compilation albums: 3
- Singles: 35
- Music videos: 31
- Reissues: 1

British singer-songwriter Jessie Ware has released six studio albums (and one reissue), three compilation albums, thirty-five singles, four extended plays and thirty-one music videos.

Ware released her debut studio album Devotion in 2012, charting at number five on the UK Albums Chart. The album included the singles "Running", "110%" and "Wildest Moments". The album was later certified Gold by the British Phonographic Industry for sales over 100,000 copies. The singer's second album Tough Love was released in 2014, scoring Ware her second consecutive top-ten album. It includes the title track and the Ed Sheeran-penned "Say You Love Me" as singles. Both attained Ware's first top-forty positions on the UK Singles Chart. Her third album, Glasshouse was released in 2017 and again achieved a top-ten position in the UK. It includes the singles "Midnight", "Selfish Love" and "Alone". In 2020, she released What's Your Pleasure?, her fourth album, it includes singles such as "Spotlight" and "Save a Kiss", the album peaked at number three in the UK, being her highest appearance on the chart. Her first two compilation albums were released in 2025.

== Albums ==
=== Studio albums ===
Title	Details	Peak chart positions										Sales	Certifications (sales thresholds)
Title	Details	UK	AUS	BEL	DEN	IRE	NZ	POL	SCO	SWI	US	Sales	Certifications (sales thresholds)
Devotion	Released: 20 August 2012; Label: PMR, Island; Formats: CD, LP, digital download, streaming	5	—	8	38	74	—	13	20	59	79	UK: 140,486	BPI: Gold; ZPAV: Platinum
Tough Love	Released: 13 October 2014; Label: PMR, Island; Formats: CD, LP, digital download, streaming	9	36	29	—	14	32	6	11	40	50	UK: 108,839	BPI: Gold; ZPAV: 2× Platinum
Glasshouse	Released: 20 October 2017; Label: PMR, Island; Formats: CD, LP, digital download, streaming	7	—	67	—	31	— (Note: Glasshouse did not chart on the NZ Top 40 Albums Chart, but peaked at number 4 on the NZ Heatseeker Albums chart.)	9	11	—	—	UK: 43,412	ZPAV: Platinum
What's Your Pleasure?	Released: 26 June 2020; Label: PMR, Virgin EMI; Formats: CD, LP, cassette, digital download, streaming	3	—	36	—	28	—	17	3	66	— (Note: What's Your Pleasure? did not enter the US Billboard 200, but did peak at number 34 on the Billboard Top Album Sales chart.)	UK: 66,426	BPI: Silver; ZPAV: Gold
That! Feels Good!	Released: 28 April 2023; Label: EMI; Formats: CD, LP, cassette, digital download, streaming	3	—	54	—	28	—	25	5	70	— (Note: That! Feels Good! did not enter the US Billboard 200, but did peak at number 16 on the Billboard Top Album Sales chart.)		
Superbloom	Released: 17 April 2026; Label: EMI; Formats: CD, LP, cassette, digital download, streaming	2	84	35	—	73	—	19	1	87	—	UK: 18,582	
"—" denotes a recording that did not chart or was not released in that territory.

=== Reissues ===
Title	Details	Peak chart positions	
Title	Details	UK	SCO
What's Your Pleasure? (The Platinum Pleasure Edition)	Released: 11 June 2021; Label: PMR, EMI; Formats: 2×LP, 2×CD, 2×Cassette, digital download, streaming	7	3

=== Compilation albums ===
Title	Details
Disco & Groove	Released: 31 October 2025; Label: uDiscover Music, UMG; Formats: Digital download, streaming
Love & Heartbreak	Released: 14 November 2025; Label: uDiscover Music, UMG; Formats: Digital download, streaming
Remixes	Released: 28 November 2025; Label: uDiscover Music, UMG; Formats: Digital download, streaming

== Extended plays ==
Title	Details	Peak chart positions
Title	Details	US Heat
Nervous	Released: 10 November 2010; Label: Numbers; Formats: Digital download	—
No to Love	Released: 12 November 2012; Label: PMR; Formats: Digital download	—
Spotify Sessions (Live from Spotify London)	Released: 1 January 2013; Label: Island; Formats: Streaming	—
If You're Never Gonna Move	Released: 15 January 2013; Label: Island; Formats: CD, digital download	11
"—" denotes a recording that did not chart or was not released in that territory.

== Singles ==
=== As lead artist ===
Title	Year	Peak chart positions								Certifications	Album
Title	Year	UK	AUS	BEL (FL) Tip	FRA	NED	POL	SCO	US Dance	Certifications	Album
"Nervous" (with SBTRKT)	2010	—	—	—	—	—	—	—	—		Nervous
"Valentine" (with Sampha)	2011	—	—	—	—	—	—	—	—		Devotion – The Gold Edition
"Strangest Feeling"	2011	—	—	—	—	—	—	—	—		Devotion
"Running"	2012	165	—	17	—	99	—	—	—	BPI: Silver	Devotion
"If You're Never Gonna Move"	2012	41 (Note: Originally peaked at 61 as "110%". Peaked in 2013 under the new title, "If You're Never Gonna Move".)	—	20	—	—	—	—	—		Devotion
"Wildest Moments"	2012	46	—	— (Note: "Wildest Moments" is the only of Ware's singles to have made the official Flanders Ultratop 50, where it peaked at number 3.)	—	—	— (Note: "Wildest Moments" did not enter the Top 5 AirPlay Chart, but peaked at number four on the AirPlay New Chart.)	—	—	BPI: Silver; BEA: Gold	Devotion
"Night Light"	2012	95	—	7	—	—	—	—	—		Devotion
"Sweet Talk"	2013	—	—	—	—	—	—	—	—		Devotion
"Imagine It Was Us"	2013	105	—	15	148	—	—	—	—		Devotion
"Tough Love"	2014	34	—	19	—	—	—	37	—		Tough Love
"Say You Love Me"	2014	22	91	30	—	—	— (Note: "Say You Love Me" did not enter the Top 20 AirPlay Chart, but peaked at number one on the AirPlay New Chart.)	18	—	BPI: Platinum	Tough Love
"You & I (Forever)"	2015	—	—	34	—	—	—	—	—		Tough Love
"Champagne Kisses"	2015	169	—	—	—	—	—	—	—		Tough Love
"Midnight"	2017	89	—	—	—	—	53	69	—		Glasshouse
"Selfish Love"	2017	—	—	—	—	—	—	—	—		Glasshouse
"Alone"	2017	60	—	—	—	—	19	29	—	BPI: Silver	Glasshouse
"Your Domino"	2017	—	—	—	—	—	—	—	—		Glasshouse
"Overtime"	2018	—	—	—	—	—	—	—	—		What's Your Pleasure? (The Platinum Pleasure Edition)
"Adore You"	2019	—	—	—	—	—	—	—	—		What's Your Pleasure?
"Mirage (Don't Stop)"	2019	—	—	—	—	—	—	—	—		What's Your Pleasure?
"Spotlight"	2020	— (Note: "Spotlight" did not enter the UK Singles Chart, but peaked at number 32 on the UK Singles Downloads Chart.)	—	—	—	—	—	38	—		What's Your Pleasure?
"Ooh La La"	2020	—	—	—	—	—	—	—	—		What's Your Pleasure?
"Save a Kiss"	2020	— (Note: "Save a Kiss" did not enter the UK Singles Chart, but peaked at number 43 on the UK Singles Downloads Chart.)	—	—	—	—	—	48	—		What's Your Pleasure?
"What's Your Pleasure?"	2020	—	—	—	—	—	—	—	—		What's Your Pleasure?
"Remember Where You Are"	2021	— (Note: "Remember Where You Are" did not enter the UK Singles Chart, but peaked at number 8 on the UK Singles Downloads Chart.)	—	—	—	—	—	—	—		What's Your Pleasure?
"Please"	2021	— (Note: "Please" did not enter the UK Singles Chart, but peaked at number 60 on the UK Singles Downloads Chart.)	—	—	—	—	—	—	48		What's Your Pleasure? (The Platinum Pleasure Edition)
"Hot N Heavy"	2021	—	—	—	—	—	—	—	—		What's Your Pleasure? (The Platinum Pleasure Edition)
"Kiss of Life" (with Kylie Minogue)	2021	— (Note: "Kiss of Life" did not enter the UK Singles Chart, but peaked at number 30 on the UK Singles Downloads Chart.)	—	—	—	—	—	—	49		Disco: Guest List Edition
"Free Yourself"	2022	— (Note: "Free Yourself" did not enter the UK Singles Chart, but peaked at number 33 on the UK Singles Downloads Chart.)	—	—	—	—	—	—	—		That! Feels Good!
"Pearls" (solo or Brabo remix featuring Pabllo Vittar)	2023	— (Note: "Pearls" did not enter the UK Singles Chart, but peaked at number 49 on the UK Singles Downloads Chart.)	—	—	—	—	—	—	44		That! Feels Good!
"Begin Again"	2023	— (Note: "Begin Again" did not enter the UK Singles Chart, but peaked at number 29 on the UK Singles Downloads Chart.)	—	—	—	—	—	—	—		That! Feels Good!
"Freak Me Now" (with Róisín Murphy)	2023	— (Note: "Freak Me Now" did not enter the UK Singles Chart, but peaked at number 37 on the UK Singles Downloads Chart.)	—	—	—	—	—	—	—		That! Feels Good!
"Hello Love"	2023	— (Note: "Hello Love" did not enter the UK Singles Chart, but peaked at number 39 on the UK Singles Downloads Chart.)	—	—	—	—	—	—	—		That! Feels Good!
"Lift You Up" (with Romy)	2024	—	—	—	—	—	—	—	—		Non-album single
"Heaven in Your Arms" (with Salute)	2024	—	—	—	—	—	—	—	—		True Magic
"I Could Get Used to This"	2026	— (Note: "I Could Get Used to This" did not enter the UK Singles Chart, but peaked at number 43 on the UK Singles Downloads Chart.)	—	—	—	—	—	—	—		Superbloom
"Ride"	2026	— (Note: "Ride" did not enter the UK Singles Chart, but peaked at number 30 on the UK Singles Downloads Chart.)	—	—	—	—	—	—	—		Superbloom
"Automatic"	2026	—	—	—	—	—	—	—	—		Superbloom
"Sauna"	2026	—	—	—	—	—	—	—	—		Superbloom
"Middle of the Night"	2026	—	—	—	—	—	—	—	—		Sauna (deluxe)
"—" denotes a recording that did not chart or was not released in that territory.

=== Promotional singles ===
Title	Year	Album
"Soul Control"	2020	What's Your Pleasure?

=== As featured artist ===
Title	Year	Album
"Take Care" (The Magic Gang featuring Jessie Ware)	2018	Non-album singles
"Time After Time" (Franky Wah featuring Jessie Ware)	2019	Non-album singles

== Other appearances ==
Title	Year	Other artist(s)	Album
"Nervous"	2010	SBTRKT	Nervous
"Lovestruck"	2010	Man Like Me	Lovestruck
"Run Over"	2010	Man Like Me	Lovestruck
"Why Bother?"	2010	Man Like Me	Lovestruck
"Midnight Loving"	2010	RackNRuin, Trendy	Soundclash
"Soundclash"	2010	RackNRuin	Soundclash
"The Vision (Let Me Breathe)"	2011	Joker	The Vision
"Right Thing to Do"	2011	SBTRKT	SBTRKT
"Sanctuary"	2011	SBTRKT, Sampha	SBTRKT
"Love Is Gonna Lift You Up"	2012	Bobby Womack	The Bravest Man in the Universe
"Aaliyah"	2012	Katy B	Little Red
"Shut Down Shop"	2012	SBTRKT	—N/a
"Confess to Me"	2013	Disclosure	Settle
"Peppermint"	2013	Julio Bashmore	"Peppermint"
"Her Favorite Song"	2013	Mayer Hawthorne	Where Does This Door Go
"Adorn"	2013	Miguel	Adorn
"Never Knew Love Like This Before"	2013	—N/a	I Give It a Year
"The Crying Game"	2014	Nicki Minaj	The Pinkprint
"Problem (Solved)"	2014	SBTRKT	Wonder Where We Land
"Break Away"	2014	Cool Uncle (Bobby Caldwell & Jack Splash)	Cool Uncle
"Meet Me in the Middle"	2015	—N/a	Fifty Shades of Grey
"A Dream Is a Wish Your Heart Makes"	2015	—N/a	We Love Disney
"Till the End"	2016	—N/a	Me Before You
"So Well"	2016	The Invisible	Patience
"Running/Finally"	2017	Pete Tong, Jules Buckley, The Heritage Orchestra	Ibiza Classics
"Wish Me Well"	2018	MIST	Diamond in the Dirt
"Better Together"	2018	—N/a	Sherlock Gnomes
"Walking Alone"	2019	Octavian, J.Rick	Endorphins
"Lost in LA"	2021	Two Inch Punch, James Vincent McMorrow	A Month of Sundays

== Music videos ==
Title	Year	Directors
"Valentine"	2011	Marcus Söderlund
"Running"	2012	Kate Moross
"If You're Never Gonna Move"	2012	Kate Moross
"Wildest Moments"	2012	Kate Moross
"Night Light"	2012	Chris Sweeney
"If You Love Me"	2012	Kate Moross
"Sweet Talk"	2013	Joel Wilson
"Imagine It Was Us"	2013	Kate Moross
"Tough Love"	2014	Jake Scott, Luke Scott
"Say You Love Me"	2014	Luke White, Remi Weekes
"You & I (Forever)"	2014	Adam Powell
"Champagne Kisses"	2015	Chris Sweeney
"Midnight"	2017	Tom Beard
"Selfish Love"	2017	Tom Beard
"Alone"	2017	Charlie Robbins
"Spotlight"	2020	Jovan Todorović
"Save a Kiss"	2020	Vicky Lawton
"What's Your Pleasure?" (dance video)	2020	I Could Never Be a Dancer
"Soul Control"	2020	I Could Never Be a Dancer
"Step Into My Life"	2020	Madison Shelpuk
"In Your Eyes"	2020	Francesca de Bassa
"The Kill"	2020	Najeeb Tarazi
"What's Your Pleasure?"	2020	Vicky Lawton
"Remember Where You Are"	2021	Dominic Savage
"Please"	2021	I Could Never Be a Dancer
"Hot n Heavy"	2021	I Could Never Be a Dancer
"Kiss of Life"	2021	Sophie Muller
"Free Yourself"	2022	Vicky Lawton
"Pearls"	2023	Sophie Muller
"Begin Again"	2023	Charlie Di Placidor
"Freak Me Now" (with Róisín Murphy)	2023	Sophie Muller, Theo Adams
"I Could Get Used to This"	2026	Fa & Fon
"Ride"	2026	Thomas James

== Songwriting credits ==
List of songs written or co-written for other artists, showing year released and album name
Title	Year	Artist	Album
"Days Are Gone"	2013	Haim	Days Are Gone
"New Man"	2017	Ed Sheeran	÷
"Outside"	2021	Worryworry	Non-album single
"Love Controller"	2026	Demi Lovato	It's Not That Deep (Unless You Want It to Be)
