= Aries Moross =

British graphic designer, art director, and illustrator

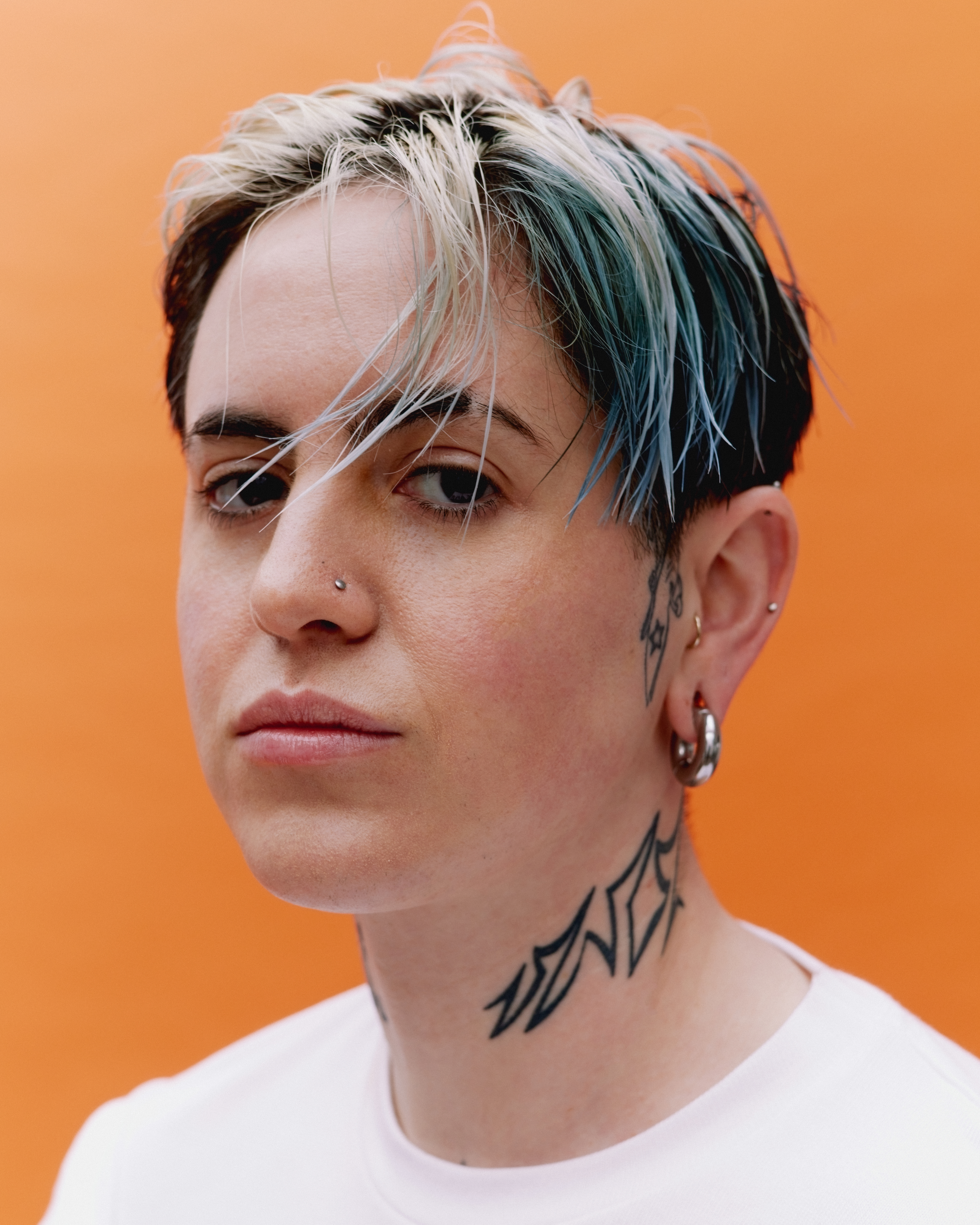
- Aries Moross in 2022
- Education: Camberwell School of Art
- Occupations: Graphic designer, artist, illustrator, art director
- Notable work: Studio Moross
- Website: www.ariesmoross.com

Aries Moross, is an English graphic designer, artist, illustrator, and art director based in London. They mostly focus on lettering and typography in their works of art. They have also directed music videos, and acted as art director for singer Jessie Ware. They have their own studio, Studio Moross, founded in 2012.

== Early life and education ==
Moross attended South Hampstead High School in North London for primary and secondary school, where they were inspired by their art teacher, and became proficient in the use of computers for creating art. They became proficient in using Photoshop and Dreamweaver, and interested in animation and rotoscoping. After completing school at South Hampstead in 2004, they went on to study art foundation at Wimbledon School of Art. In 2005 they did a short course at the London College of Communication, where they met Neville Brody.

They then completed a BA degree in graphic design at Camberwell School of Art in 2008.

== Career ==
=== Isomorph Records ===
In 2007, while still studying, Moross launched vinyl-only record label Isomorph Records, set up in order to explore further the relationship between design and music. The label released tracks by Cutting Pink With Knives, Hearts Revolution, Midnight Juggernauts, and Apes and Androids and Pictureplane.

=== Illustration and design ===
Moross is known for typographic illustration. Their achievements include a nationwide billboard campaign for Cadburys, a signature clothing range for Topshop. and illustrations for Vogue magazine.

They have worked in London and New York, and other clients have included Virgin, Glastonbury, Paul Smith, and Kiehl's.

=== Music videos and related work ===
In 2009 they were appointed art director for Simian Mobile Disco, developing album artwork, music videos' and live performance visuals.

In 2010, Moross became a director at Pulse Films, where they directed several music videos.

Moross has directed other music videos, including for Alpines in 2011.

In 2012 they acted as art director for Jessie Ware and has directed several music videos for them, including "Running", "Wildest Moments" and "If You're Never Gonna Move" (2012).

==== Studio Moross ====
In 2012, Moross founded Studio Moross, which focuses on music-based projects. Through their studio, they have worked as creative director as well as more hands-on work as illustrator or designer.

By 2021 the studio had a staff of around ten people, and had created music graphics for pop singers such as Anne-Marie and The Spice Girls on tour, as well as festivals, including Parklife (for at least five years). Their clients and work included a Manchester club for The Warehouse Project; branding for the British Film Institute's Flare Festival for LGBTQ+ films in 2020; animated titles for American children's TV show All That; Nike; Billie Eilish; and MTV.

== Other activities ==
Moross sat on the jury for the D&AD Awards in 2012.

In 2014 they published Make Your Own luck: A DIY Attitude to Graphic Design, with foreword by Neville Brody.

== Recognition and awards ==
Moross has been featured by Creative Review, who selected them for a Creative Futures bursary in 2007.

In 2008, Moross was named at number 18 in the NME's Future 50 innovators driving music forward.

Moross ran with the Torch in Lewisham for the London Olympics 2012.

Moross has been profiled in Dazed & Confused, and Vice magazines.

== Personal life ==
Moross is transgender and non-binary and uses they/them pronouns. They came out around 2017 or earlier.
