= Glasshouse (album) =

Studio album by Jessie Ware
- Released: 20 October 2017
- Recorded: 2016–2017
- Genre: Pop; soul; R&B
- Length: 46:19
- Label: Island
- Producer: Stint; Benny Blanco; Kid Harpoon; Bastian Langebaek; Pop Wansel; Sammy Witte; Happy Perez; Cashmere Cat; Starsmith; Two Inch Punch; Fred Ball; John Ryan; Dante Hemingway; Julian Bunetta; Hugo White; Felix White; Jamie Scott; Dave Okumu

Jessie Ware chronology
Tough Love (2014)	Glasshouse (2017)	What's Your Pleasure? (2020)

Singles from Glasshouse
- 1. "Midnight" Released: 28 July 2017; 2. "Selfish Love" Released: 31 August 2017; 3. "Alone" Released: 14 September 2017

Glasshouse is the third studio album by British singer-songwriter Jessie Ware. It was released on 20 October 2017 through Island Records. The album was supported by the singles "Midnight", "Selfish Love" and "Alone".

== Background ==
Commenting on the creation process, Ware elaborated that she "really tried to rush this record" because she wanted to finish the album before having her first baby in September 2016, and "was being led by other people in the songwriting rooms, more than I was leading" as she was pregnant when the album was being written. She further added: "I was writing really shit music because I had this fear like, 'Must provide. Must make a hit for my unborn child' [...] I think I'd lost a bit of my identity, and it took my mate Benny Blanco to be like, 'This is really shit. I don't know what you're doing. Why are you not doing what you do?' It was such a relief, because I knew exactly what he meant." Following her conversation with Blanco in December 2016, she decided to reconstruct the album and booked additional recordings sessions with musicians such as producer Starsmith and songwriter James Newman.

Next to Starmsith and Newman the singer collaborated with a variety of producers and songwriters on Glasshouse, including Julia Michaels, Francis and the Lights, Cashmere Cat, Benny Blanco and Ed Sheeran. Ware cited Childish Gambino's Awaken, My Love! (2016), and Solange's A Seat at the Table (2016), and Christine and the Queens' Chaleur humaine (2014) as her major inspirations for the album, noting: "They all have such strong identities, and I wanted that. I wanted to feel in control," she said. When asked about the message behind this album, she said: "I've written with a lot of different people, but I think what's bringing it all together is my voice, and the storytelling. It's quite a personal record, which I didn't realize [when writing it]. I thought I was just writing songs, but it's become this record that's for my husband and my baby. It's been a wild couple of years, and I feel like this album represents those ups and downs, the fear, the beauty, and the celebrations." On 5 September 2017, Ware announced the album's title and posted its artwork on social media.

== Title and artwork ==
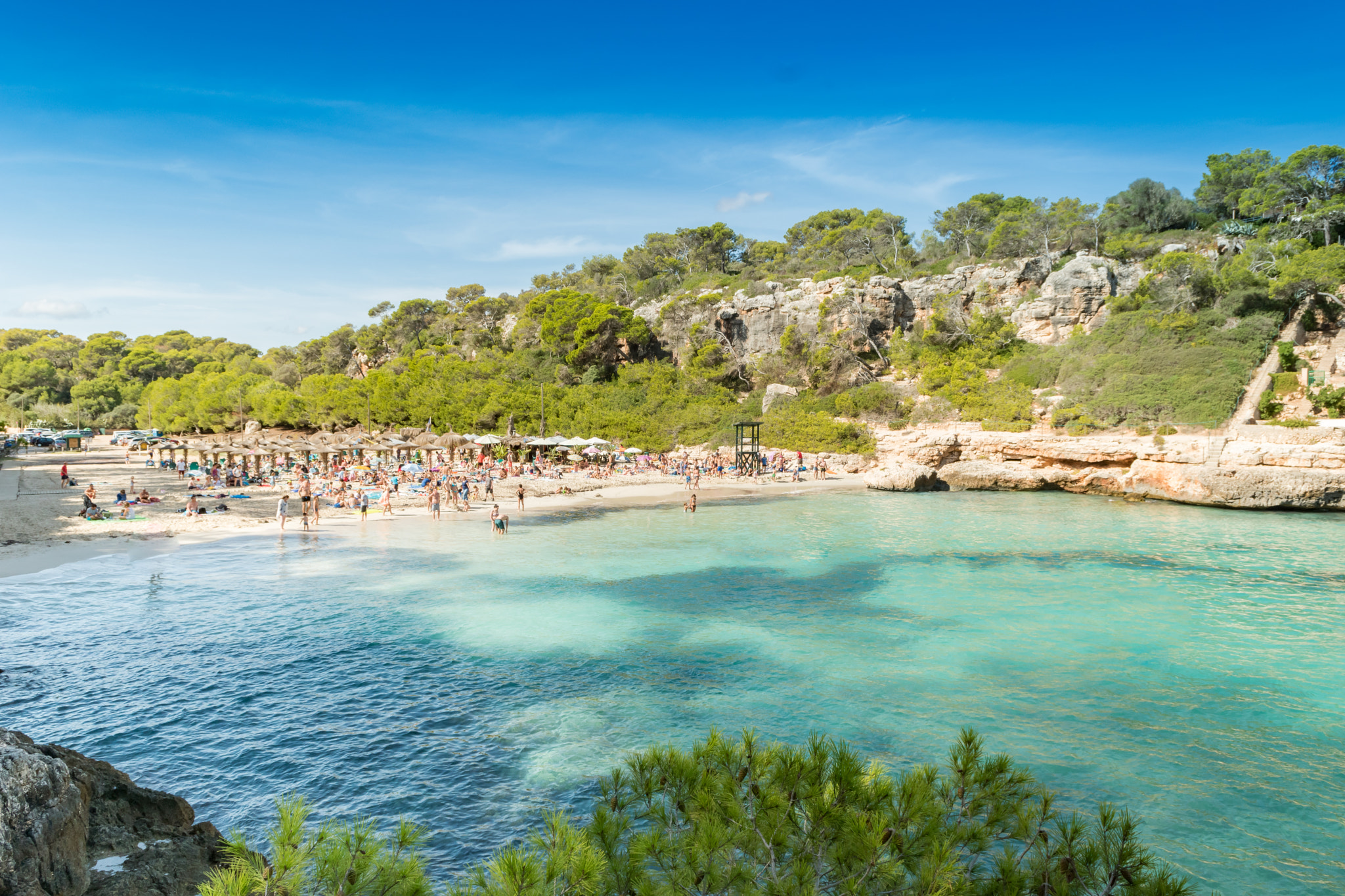
Artwork for Glasshouse was photographed at the Neuendorf House near Santanyí, Mallorca.

The album title was inspired by Edward Thomas's poem "I Built Myself a House of Glass". While song titles were used while naming Ware's previous album, she "just didn't feel like any of them did justice to this album." In an interview with Billboard, she further commented: "Glasshouse, I guess for me represents this beautiful thing, which is very easy to shatter. I've become a mother; it's changed my world for the better. But I'm also learning how to do it. Also, I think I've given more of myself in this record [...] So, it's about me working out this situation and trying to do the best, but also knowing that it’s quite a fragile, funny situation."

The cover artwork for Glasshouse features Ware emerging from the courtyard of the Neuendorf House on the island of Mallorca, Spain. Designed by architects John Pawson and Claudio Silvestrin in 1991, the modernist villa is a vacation house for a German art dealer set in an almond grove. Ware wanted the cover to emphasise architecture; as she explained in an interview with The Fader the week before the image was shot, "This record is so personal and romantic, that I want a nostalgic image on the front [...] I really want architecture in the album cover. I want to graduate from being in the [photo] studio for artwork where it had to be all about my face. I want it to be a beautiful image that maybe I'm a small part of." As a result, the cover is not exclusively focused on Ware. According to Pitchfork, "the eye is drawn as much to the soft, ruddy brown of the walls or the blue sky packed into a crisp rectangle above her", while Ware's name and the word "Glasshouse" are stylised in an uppercase pale pink font and located in the center of the image. The album artwork and singles campaign was designed by Samuel Muir Studio.

== Critical reception ==
Professional ratings
Aggregate scores
Source	Rating
Metacritic	72/100
Review scores
Source	Rating
The A.V. Club	B+
AllMusic	3.5/5 stars
Clash	6/10
Consequence of Sound	C+
The Observer	3/5 stars
Pitchfork	8.0/10
Slant Magazine	3.5/5 stars
Tom Hull	B+

At Metacritic, which assigns a normalised rating out of 100 to reviews from mainstream critics, Glasshouse has an average score of 72 out of 100, which indicates "generally favorable reviews" based on 13 reviews. Pitchfork editor Brad Nelson felt that "each song on Glasshouse has its own distinct aesthetic; unlike her previous albums there are no songs here that could be confused for each other, none that seem an afterthought carved from the greater mood of the album. Here, tracks are discrete entities, seemingly designed and assembled by its own team of architects [...] It almost feels like Ware is trying to divert attention from herself, but she is positioned directly at the center of the album’s trembling choreography. She connects each of these unrelated environments—shaping them." Andy Kellman from AllMusic gave it a three-and-a-half-out-of-five rating. In the positive review he wrote that "Ware's third album is packed with finely woven adult-pop ballads about lust, longing, commitment, and reassurance." He found that "Though Ware co-wrote all the songs and is in full command from start to finish, the album has a stitched-together quality that starts to slowly unravel during the second half.

The A.V. Club gave the album a B+ rating and compared the album to "Haim’s studio-perfect (and occasionally too studied) evocation of decades of pop radio and adult contemporary music. It’s timeless stuff, almost imagistic in the way it conjures the specters of belters past like Whitney Houston, Mariah Carey, and Annie Lennox." The online newspaper added: "Glasshouse resolutely has the goods, packaging a handful of searing, bring-down-the-house ballads in an album that stands alongside her debut [...] There’s an earned earnestness to its emotional palette, even as it tumbles into schmaltzy paeans to domestic bliss. If it weren’t executed so sincerely, the whole thing would fall flat. But Ware walks the tightwire, and the result is as thrilling, in its own quiet way, as anything she’s produced." Michael Cragg, writing for The Observer, described the release as "solid ground" and a "pivotal release for Ware." He felt that while the singles released in advance of the album "hinted at a more robust sound [...] it still feels a little too safe," though all song "perfectly showcase Ware’s crystalline vocals – you just wish she’d step out of her comfort zone more often." The same rating was given by Clash's Robin Murray, who wrote that Glasshouse "promised to break the glass ceiling, but instead finds the singer treading lukewarm water [...] Too often, it fails to challenge itself."

== Commercial performance ==
Glasshouse debuted at number seven in the United Kingdom on 23 October 2017, with 8,448 album-equivalent units, as reported by Music Week. The album became Ware's third consecutive top ten entry on the UK Albums Chart.

== Track listing ==
Glasshouse – Standard version
No.	Title	Writer(s)	Producer(s)	Length
1.	"Midnight"	Jessie Ware; Andrew Wansel; Bastian Langebaek; Dante Hemingway; Jordan Thomas; Kiah Victoria	Langebaek; Pop Wansel^{[c]}	3:57
2.	"Thinking About You"	Ware; Thomas Hull	Kid Harpoon; Sammy Witte^{[a]}	3:28
3.	"Stay Awake, Wait for Me"	Ware; Ajay Battacharya; Alexandra Govere; Danny Parker	Stint	3:35
4.	"Your Domino"	Ware; Battacharya; Govere; Parker; Danny Schnair	Stint	3:47
5.	"Alone"	Ware; Hemingway; Sarah Aarons; Hull	Kid Harpoon; Stint	3:36
6.	"Selfish Love"	Ware; Ross Golan; Magnus August Høiberg; Benjamin Levin; Ammar Malik; Nathan Perez; Ryan Tedder	Happy Perez; Benny Blanco; Cashmere Cat	3:57
7.	"First Time"	Ware; Finlay Dow-Smith; James Newman	Starsmith	4:05
8.	"Hearts"	Ware; Benjamin Ash; Levin; Hemingway; Julia Michaels	Blanco; Two Inch Punch	3:33
9.	"Slow Me Down"	Ware; Fredrik Ball; Nina Nesbitt; Samuel Preston	Ball	3:24
10.	"Finish What We Started"	Ware; Julian Bunetta; John Ryan; Jamie Scott	Ryan; Bunetta	3:49
11.	"Last of the True Believers" (featuring Paul Buchanan)	Ware; Liam Howe; Felix White; Hugo White	H. White; F. White^{[a]}	3:53
12.	"Sam"	Ware; Christopher Dave; Levin; Hemingway; David Okumu; Ed Sheeran; Pino Palladino; Nico Segal; Francis Farewell Starlite	Blanco	5:15
Total length:				46:19

Glasshouse – Deluxe Edition
No.	Title	Writer(s)	Producer(s)	Length
13.	"Til the End"	Ware; Okumu; Scott; Sacha Skarbek	Scott; Okumu^{[a]}	3:02
14.	"Love to Love"	Ware; Battacharya; Govere; Parker	Stint	3:31
15.	"Hearts" (acoustic)	Ware; Ash; Levin; Michaels		3:30
16.	"Alone" (acoustic)	Ware; Aarons; Hemingway; Hull		3:46
17.	"Last of the True Believers" (acoustic)	Ware; Howe; H. White; F. White		3:41
Total length:				63:49

Notes

- ^{^[c]} signifies a co-producer
- ^{^[a]} signifies an additional producer.

== Personnel ==
Musicians

- Jessie Ware – vocals
- Bastian Langebaek – background vocals, keyboards, programming, vocal arrangement (track 1)
- Jordan Thomas – background vocals, vocal arrangement (1)
- Kiah Victoria – background vocals, vocal arrangement (1)
- Pop Wansel – programming (1)
- J Burrows – additional vocals (2)
- Kid Harpoon – bass guitar, drum programming, synthesizer (2); background vocals (5)
- Dante Hemingway - programming (1,5,8,12), studio personnel (1,5,8,12)
- Sammy Witte – drum programming, electric guitar, piano, synthesizer (2)
- Danny Parker – background vocals, guitar (3, 4, 14)
- Shungudzo Kuyimba – background vocals (3, 4, 14)
- Ajay Bhattacharyya – drums, programming (3–5, 14); piano (3, 5), synthesizer (4, 5), bass guitar (4); bass programming, guitar (14)
- Daniel Schnair – guitar (4)
- Fabiana Palladino – background vocals (5, 15–17), piano (11, 15–17)
- Joy Joseph – background vocals (5, 15–17), percussion (15–17)
- Sarah Aarons – background vocals (5)
- Ammar Malik – additional vocals (6)
- Ross Golan – additional vocals (6)
- Pino Palladino – bass guitar (6, 12)
- Chris Dave – drums (6, 12)
- Dave Okumu – guitar (6, 12, 13); background vocals, bass guitar, programming (13)
- Happy Perez – guitar, keyboards, programming (6)
- Benny Blanco – keyboards, programming (6, 8, 12)
- Cashmere Cat – keyboards, programming (6)
- Fin Dow-Smith – drums, electric guitar, keyboards, percussion, synthesizer (7)
- Julia Michaels – additional vocals (8)
- Benjamin Ross Ash – guitar, programming (8)
- Jarle Bernhoft – bass guitar (9)
- Eivind Helgerød – drums (9)
- Fredrik Ball – keyboards, percussion (9)
- Jamie Scott – guitar (10, 13), background vocals (10)
- John Ryan – background vocals, drums, guitar, keyboards (10)
- Julian Bunetta – background vocals, bass guitar (10)
- Paul Buchanan – additional vocals (11)
- Sam Doyle – drums (11)
- Felix White – guitar (11)
- Hugo White – guitar, programming (11)
- Ed Sheeran – background vocals, guitar (12)
- Nico Segal – trumpet (12)
- Ash Soan – drums (13)
- Sacha Skarbek – keyboards (13)
- Joe Newman – acoustic guitar, background vocals, clapping, electric guitar (15–17)

Technical

- Stuart Hawkes – mastering (1–5, 7–17)
- Ryan Smith – mastering (6)
- Mark Stent – mixing (1, 4–6, 8, 12)
- Lexxx – mixing (2, 3, 7, 9–11, 14)
- Dan Parry – mixing (13)
- John Foyle – mixing (15–17)
- Bastian Langebaek – engineering (1)
- Brendon Harding – engineering (1)
- Jack Chown – engineering (1)
- Jordan Thomas – engineering (1)
- Joseph Gallagher – engineering (1)
- Ajay Bhattacharyya – engineering (3, 4, 14)
- Casey Kalmenson – engineering (3, 4)
- David Schwerkolt – engineering (6)
- Billy Halliday – engineering (15–17)
- Morgan Stratton – engineering assistance (6)

== Charts ==
Chart performance for Glasshouse
Chart (2017)	Peak position
Belgian Albums (Ultratop Flanders)	67
Croatian International Albums (HDU)	4
Greek Albums (IFPI)	34
Irish Albums (IRMA)	31
New Zealand Heatseeker Albums (RMNZ)	4
Polish Albums (ZPAV)	9
Scottish Albums (OCC)	11
UK Albums (OCC)	7

== Certifications ==
Certifications for Glasshouse
Region	Certification	Certified units/sales
Poland (ZPAV)	Platinum	20,000^{‡}
^{‡} Sales+streaming figures based on certification alone.
