= Devotion (Jessie Ware album) =

Studio album by Jessie Ware
- Released: 20 August 2012
- Recorded: 2010–2012
- Studio: Red Bull Studios in London Bridge, London, United Kingdom
- Genre: Pop; sophisti-pop; art pop; alternative R&B; soul
- Length: 43:31
- Label: PMR; Island; Interscope
- Producer: Julio Bashmore; Kid Harpoon; Dave Okumu; Wilma Archer; Sampha; Hassan Hamandi; Brey Baptista; Dave Corney; James Napier; Velour

Jessie Ware chronology
Nervous (2010)	Devotion (2012)	No to Love (2012)

Jessie Ware studio album chronology
Devotion (2012)	Tough Love (2014)

Singles from Devotion
- 1. "Running" Released: 24 February 2012; 2. "110%" Released: 13 April 2012; 3. "Wildest Moments" Released: 29 June 2012; 4. "Night Light" Released: 25 September 2012; 5. "Sweet Talk" Released: 21 January 2013; 6. "Imagine It Was Us" Released: 12 April 2013

Devotion is the debut studio album by British singer-songwriter Jessie Ware. It was released in the United Kingdom on 20 August 2012, by PMR Records and Island Records, and in the United States on 16 April 2013, by Cherrytree and Interscope Records. Production for the album came primarily from Dave Okumu of alternative rock band The Invisible, alongside house Record producer Julio Bashmore and Kid Harpoon with contribution from Wilma Archer, fellow UK musician and collaborator Sampha and Hassan Hamandi, while Ware co-wrote most of the album tracks' lyrics.

The album was re-released under the title "Devotion – The Gold Edition" on 15 April 2013 in the United Kingdom, containing a bonus disc with four tracks, including a new single, "Imagine It Was Us" and "Valentine" – a previously released collaboration with musician Sampha in 2011. One day later, this version was released in the United States under its original title with a slightly different track list, omitting the latter track while including a remix version of "Wildest Moments", which features American rapper A$AP Rocky.

Upon its release, Devotion received critical acclaim from various critics for its "sophisticated, smooth and sensual" production, further citing the album as a "uniquely soulful masterclass". Ware's vocal performance also received positive remarks, with music critics praising her being "faithful to melody over melisma" and her background as a backing vocalist. The album was eventually chosen as the twentieth best album of 2012, and later recognized as one of the 100 best albums of the decade so far by Pitchfork in August 2014. The release of Devotion also helped Ware earn her first nomination for the Album of the Year category at the 2012 Mercury Prize award, as well as other Best Female Artists and Breakthrough nominations at MOBO Awards and BRIT Awards. It also attained commercial success for Ware, becoming her first top-five entry on the UK Albums Chart, her first to receive a Gold certificate and to date, her best-selling release. The album was also her first entry on the Billboard 200 chart, peaking at number seventy-nine for one week, while being her first and only top-ten album to date on the Belgium Albums (Ultratop Flanders) chart, peaking at number eight. It also received a Platinum certificate in Poland, where it peaked at number thirteen on the Polish Albums Chart.

Six singles have been released from Devotion to further promote the project, starting with "Running" on 24 February 2012, with "If You're Never Gonna Move" and "Wildest Moments" followed en suite prior to the album release in August 2012. The latter two singles became a breakthrough success for Ware, earning the singer her first two top-fifty entries on the UK Singles Chart. "Night Light" and "Sweet Talk" were released as the album's fourth and fifth single, with the former becoming Ware's third top 100 entry on the UK Singles Chart upon its release. With the reissue of the album taking place on 15 April 2013 in the United Kingdom, "Imagine It Was Us" was released as the sixth and final single from the album, attaining minor success on both the UK Singles Chart and French Singles Chart. To further promote the album, Ware signed a distribution deal with Cherrytree Records in October 2012, which eventually led to several live gigs for the singer between December 2012 and January 2013, with follow-up tour dates which includes her participation at the Coachella Valley Music and Arts Festival, and Wireless Festival in the same year.

== Background and release ==
"Performing with him was really good training, because I got to learn all about how other people do it – I was able to perform live without the pressure of being a lead singer. It gave me a taste of what to expect, and it prepared me for what I'm doing now."

–Jessie Ware on her experience with Jack Peñate as a backing vocalist.

In the years prior to releasing her first solo album, Ware did backing vocals at live shows for Jack Peñate (who took her on tour in America) and Man Like Me. She "learned a lot" from Jack Peñate during her time. It was musician Tic, one of Peñate's bandmates, who first introduced Ware to UK electronic producer SBTRKT; whom in turn collaborated with Ware on the 2010s single "Nervous". She would go on to consequently meet fellow British musician Sampha, most known as SBTRKT's main collaborator and live member, and together the duo worked on "Valentine", which was released on a special edition, heart-shaped vinyl by Young Turks on 2011's Valentine's Day. An accompanying music video for the collaboration was directed by Marcus Söderlund, and released on the same day via the YouTube channel of Young Turks. Along with "Nervous", "Valentine" and "The Vision (Let Me Breathe)", another collaboration with DJ Joker, led Ware to a record deal with PMR Records in the same year. The singer was also featured on Ceremonials, the 2011 album by British indie rock band Florence and the Machine, in which her good friend Florence Welch is the lead singer, having contributed and credited as a backing vocalist for seven tracks on the album, with four of which were released as singles to promote the album. Following her record deal with PMR Records, Ware released her first physical single as a solo artist, titled "Strangest Feeling" on 21 November 2011, further confirming that she was "hard at work" on her first studio album, which was due to release "some time" in 2012. The singer then announced the title of her first full-length album to be Devotion, which was scheduled to be released on 20 August 2012. The album contained eleven tracks on its standard edition and four additional tracks on its iTunes deluxe edition, and was released on a singular jewel case version. A 2-disc version was released exclusively in Poland on 4 December 2012, with an additional bonus CD containing four tracks from the iTunes deluxe edition, two acoustic versions of "Running" and "Night Light" recorded at The Agnieszka Osiecka Music Studio of Polish Radio, and a remix to "Running" created by UK electronic duo Disclosure. The album was later re-released in the United Kingdom under the title The Gold Edition, which saw the addition of the previous Disclosure remix for "Running", her 2011 collaboration "Valentine" with Sampha, a remix to the third single "Wildest Moments" with guest verses from American rapper A$AP Rocky and a new song, titled "Imagine It Was Us", which was released as the sixth and final overall single from the album. The latter two tracks were later included on the United States edition of the album, released on 16 April 2013, a day after the album's re-issue date in the UK.

== Composition ==
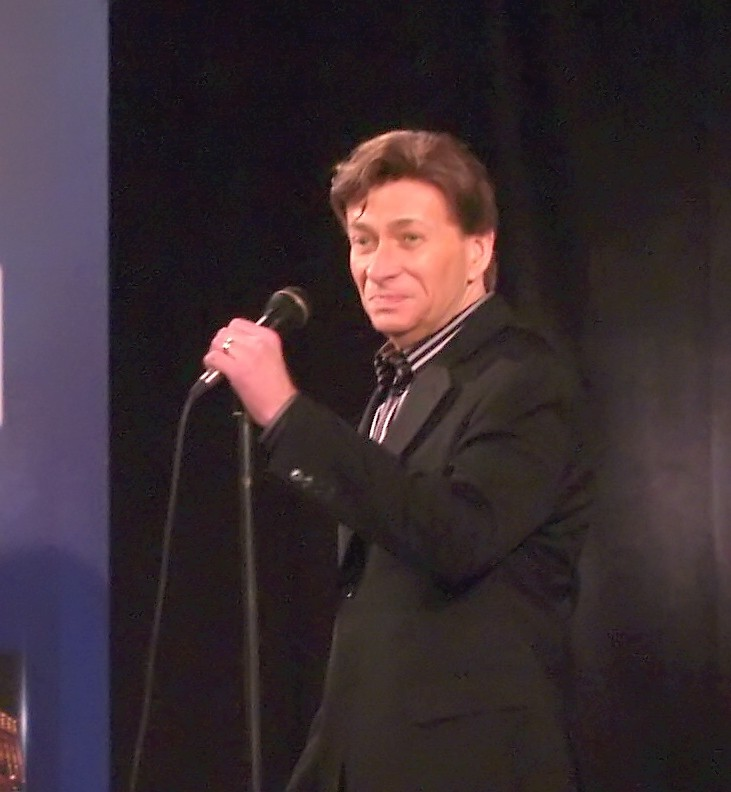
The album's deluxe edition contains Ware's cover version of "What You Won't Do for Love", the 1978's hit single by American singer-songwriter Bobby Caldwell. She would later collaborate with Caldwell on his 2015 project Cool Uncle's single "Break Away".

Except for the fifth track "No to Love", which was written and produced solely by Okumu, Ware co-wrote most of the album tracks' lyrics. Production for Devotion came primarily from Dave Okumu of alternative rock band the Invisible, whom produced twelve out of fourteen original recordings used for the album. Fellow British house record producer Julio Bashmore and singer Kid Harpoon also co-produced along with Okumu, with Bashmore handling solely the production of "110%" and Wilma Archer co-producing the eleventh track "Something Inside". Fellow UK musician and collaborator Sampha and Hassan Hamandi also contributed to two songs from the deluxe edition of the album, namely "Strangest Feeling" and "What You Won't Do for Love", with the former being released digitally on 14 October 2011 and the latter being premiered on 22 May 2012. Sampha was also credited as a collaborator on "Valentine", a song released previously on 14 February 2011 with Ware. The song was partly inspired by James Blake's song "The Wilhelm Scream" and based on both Ware and Sampha's own personal experiences in love.

Devotion opens with the eponymous album track, a "dark and dense" song that hints at "passion's underbelly" with deep bass hit that portraits sonic signature by Okumu. The second track "Wildest Moments" is a "boomy, earthy beats" epic ballad that sings about the strength of friendship, with lyrics such as "From the outside/Everyone's always wondering why we fight/Why do we fight?" and Ware's vocal being a "balancing act" between "gorgeous, bell-like" synths and chiming piano chords. The song was among the "most festival-ready songs-- big hooks, bigger drums" produced by Kid Harpoon for the album. It was followed by the first single "Running", which saw Ware "slinks and sighs" over a yacht-rock groove, "explodes at a key moment, then backs off again for an affecting conclusion", gaining comparisons to that of Sade for her "poised and pure" voice over "drums echo" and "repeated guitar lick" which gave the song a "lovely, sultry" sound. The eight track of the album "Sweet Talk" is hailed as the record's most classically "pop" song, which finds Ware pleading "Don't keep me with the kisses, there's never any there when I need," and hints at a "Whitney Houston-like belt, but keeps it constrained" within the song's "chilly" synths line, "stuttering" drum machine shuffle and "gentle, neon-lit" Rhodes piano riff. Meanwhile, the album's fourth track "Still Love Me" contains "growing loop" of effects and instruments that recalled the work of her previous collaborator SBKTRT, while "No to Love" is a song that contains "grungy guitar loops, ADD beats, and rap verse from a Flight of the Conchords sound-alike"

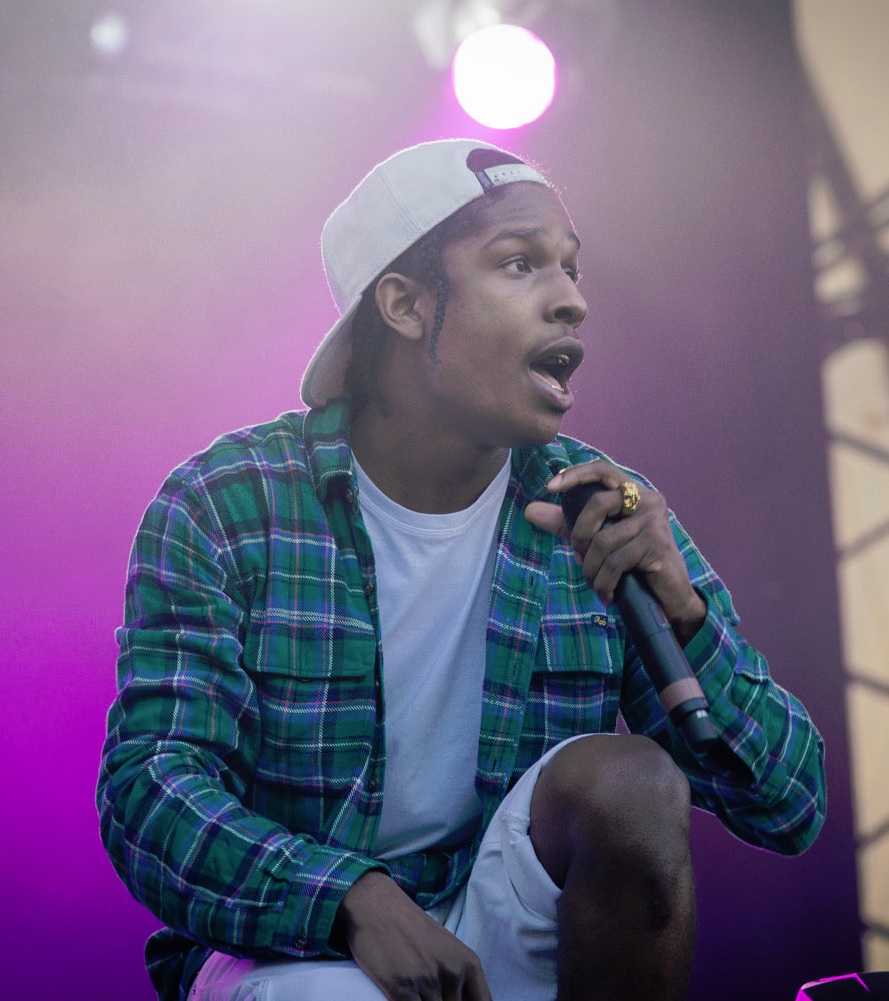
American rapper A$AP Rocky was the album's only featured guest upon its re-release for the remix of Ware's "Wildest Moments".

The album's ninth track, "110%", is a "gorgeously restrained summer smash" and "bubbly, even-keeled house" song Ware co-wrote with producer Bashmore. Originally contained a distorted sample from late Puerto-Rican / American rapper Big Pun's song "The Dream Shatterer", it was later changed following a dispute over the used sample, and eventually led to Ware re-titling the song to "If You're Never Gonna Move." The track remains all but unchanged, save for altering that loop into a similar voice laying down the line "coming on a mission like a warhead." The song was described as a "sugar rush dance-floor gem", with "bubbling" synth bass and "quicksilver" percussion that sees Ware singing about "a girl trying to get him off his throne and dance." According to the singer, both her and Bashmore were inspired to create "110%" after seeing Big Pun in a "yellow PVC suit" while sitting on a throne in a hip-hop magazine. It was followed by "Taking in Water", a "powerhouse" pop ballad with "soul, passion and intelligence" that recalls the "great" influence from Whitney Houston. With "Imagine It Was Us", the album's only new song on its re-issue edition, Ware offers her "most fun" tune with the "slinky, sultry '90s-style" house track that joins "the charge of disco revolution." It was co-written by Ware, Bashmore, Brey Baptista, Dave Corney and Jimmy Napes, with the latter most known for his work with musician duo Disclosure and fellow British singer-songwriter Sam Smith. In addition, "Wildest Moments" received another remix with guest verses by American rapper A$AP Rocky, making it her first song to have a feature artist. The rapper previously shared with BBC that he was "eager" to work with Ware, having acknowledged the singer since "last summer" and expressing his reason to collaborate. In an interview with The Juice, Ware revealed that she "loved" the rapper and wanted a guest rapper on "Wildest Moments" for the US release of the album. As the singer was at the States promoting and Mayers promoting his record in the United Kingdom, Ware sent the track to the rapper for a collaboration, eventually received an email with Mayers' verses just before the deadline to turn over the project.

== Singles and promotion ==
Prior to the album's release in 2012, Ware released her first solo single "Strangest Feeling" on 14 October 2011, which was later included on the iTunes deluxe edition only. The singer then released the lead single "Running" on 24 February 2012, along with an accompanying music video for the track. It eventually received a physical release on 4 April, along with a remix version by Disclosure. "110%" was then released as the second single on 13 April 2012, while third single "Wildest Moments" was released on 29 June 2012 and its accompanying remix by Star Slinger on 5 July. Both singles eventually became the highest-charting singles from Devotion in their native country, peaking at number forty-one and forty-six on the UK Singles Chart, respectively. As of June 2020, both singles, along with "Running" are among Ware's most successful singles in the UK, placing in her top five biggest hits in her native country. In addition, "Wildest Moments" became Ware's biggest hit in Belgian, peaking at number three on the Belgium Ultratop 50 Flanders chart for two weeks, as well as one of her only songs to receive a Silver certificate by BRIT so far. During the album release's week, "Taking in Water" was released as a free promotional single on the same physical release date of the album, with "Night Light" serving as the fourth single on 25 September 2012. The song achieved moderate success in Ware's native country, peaking at number ninety-five on the UK Singles Chart for a week. "Sweet Talk" was then released as the fifth single on 21 January 2013, but eventually became uncharted, while the only new song from The Gold Edition, titled "Imagine It Was Us", was released as the sixth single overall on 12 April 2013 to minor commercial success, barely missing out the top 100 of the UK Singles Chart while becoming her only entry on the French Singles Chart, peaking at number one-hundred and forty-eight.

Following her signing deal with Cherrytree Records for further promotion activities in the United States, Ware eventually released a US-exclusive eponymous extended play for "If You're Never Gonna Move" on 15 January 2013. Prior to the extended play's release, the singer had shows at New York venue The Box on 10 December, and later at Los Angeles' Bootleg Bar on 13 December 2012, respectively. She later embarked on a six-date concert beginning on 14 January 2013 at the Sinclair in Cambridge, Massachusetts, booked by Marty Diamond at Paradigm, to further promote the extended play. The singer eventually announced the US release date for Devotion on 18 March 2013, along with the follow-up tour dates that "culminate" with her gigs at the Coachella Valley Music and Arts Festival, and later at the 2013's Wireless Festival. "Wildest Moments" was then serviced to radio as the first official single in the States for the singer on 3 June 2013.

== Critical reception ==
Professional ratings
Aggregate scores
Source	Rating
AnyDecentMusic?	8.0/10
Metacritic	85/100
Review scores
Source	Rating
AllMusic	5/5 stars
The A.V. Club	B+
Financial Times	4/5 stars
The Guardian	4/5 stars
The Irish Times	4/5 stars
NME	8/10
Pitchfork	8.5/10
Q	4/5 stars
Rolling Stone	3.5/5 stars
Spin	8/10

Devotion received widespread acclaim from music critics upon its initial release. At Metacritic, which assigns a normalised rating out of 100 to reviews from mainstream critics, the album received an average score of 85, based on 28 reviews, which indicates "universal acclaim". Mike Diver of BBC Music wrote, "Devotion is the sort of sophisticated, soulful pop record that comes along all too rarely, a collection that never hides the heart on its sleeve. Down-tempo it may be, but no listener will come away downcast." He further commented on Ware's vocal, citing that the singer "never stretches for an out-of-reach note; she never gives her songs over to hyperbole or bombast," eventually cited her as "here, now, and superb" next big thing.

Tim Jonze of The Guardian wrote, "Sophisticated, smooth and sensual, in the wrong hands Devotion could easily have been a footnote in the New Boring movement, that vibrant strain of youth culture that has already given us Emeli Sandé, Adele and Bruce Springsteen concerts that wrestle with the spacetime continuum itself. Yet Jessie Ware's debut album is saved by one fact: for all her album's poise and restraint, dance music clearly runs through this 27-year-old south Londoner's veins. Throughout Devotion you're never told to sit up and pay attention. Instead it quietly works its magic, a genuinely individual statement by an artist who didn't expect to become a pop star, but might struggle to stop it happening anyway – after all, the groove is in her heart".

== Commercial performance ==
Devotion attained commercial success for Ware upon its initial release. By debuting at number five and sold 9,319 copies in its first week, the album was her first top-five entry on the UK Albums Chart, and at the time, her highest-charting release. It was later surpassed by the No. 3 peak of her fourth studio album What's Your Pleasure? (2020). The album eventually became her first release to receive a Gold certificate for having sold over 100,000 copies, and to date, her best-selling release in the UK.

== Track listing ==
=== International version ===
Standard edition
No.	Title	Writer(s)	Producer(s)	Length
1.	"Devotion"	Jessie Ware; Dave Okumu	Dave Okumu	3:24
2.	"Wildest Moments"	Ware; Tom Hull	Kid Harpoon; Okumu	3:42
3.	"Running"	Ware; Julio Bashmore; Brey Baptista	Okumu; Bashmore	4:28
4.	"Still Love Me"	Ware; Okumu	Okumu	3:56
5.	"No to Love"	Okumu	Okumu	3:33
6.	"Night Light"	Ware; Hull; Okumu	Okumu; Kid Harpoon (add.)	4:13
7.	"Swan Song"	Ware; Okumu	Okumu	3:43
8.	"Sweet Talk"	Ware; Bashmore; Laura Dockrill	Okumu; Bashmore	3:37
9.	"110%"	Ware; Bashmore	Bashmore	3:27
10.	"Taking in Water"	Ware; Hull	Okumu; Kid Harpoon	4:27
11.	"Something Inside"	Ware; Wilma Archer; Dockrill	Wilma Archer; Okumu	3:34
Total length:				43:31

Polish deluxe edition bonus disc
No.	Title	Length
1.	"Strangest Feeling"	3:41
2.	"What You Won't Do for Love"	4:04
3.	"Wildest Moments" (Acoustic Version)	3:37
4.	"Running" (Acoustic Version)	3:56
5.	"Running" (Wersja Akustyczna Ze Studia Polskiego Radia Im. A. Osieckiej)	3:51
6.	"Night Light" (Wersja Akustyczna Ze Studia Polskiego Radia Im. A. Osieckiej)	3:39
7.	"Running" (Disclosure Remix)	5:17

Gold edition
No.	Title	Writer(s)	Producer(s)	Length
12.	"Imagine It Was Us"	Ware; Bashmore; Baptista; Dave Corney; James Napier	Bashmore	3:24
13.	"Valentine" (Jessie Ware and Sampha)	Ware; Sampha Sisay; Tic	Sampha	2:08
14.	"Wildest Moments" (Remix) (featuring A$AP Rocky)	Ware; Rakim Mayers; Hull	Kid Harpoon; Okumu	4:07
15.	"Running" (Disclosure Remix)	Ware; Bashmore; Baptista	Disclosure	5:17

iTunes deluxe edition bonus tracks
No.	Title	Writer(s)	Length
16.	"Strangest Feeling"	Ware; Sisay; Hassan Hamandi; Okumu	3:41
17.	"What You Won't Do for Love"	Bobby Caldwell; Alfons Kettner	4:04
18.	"Wildest Moments" (Acoustic Version)	Ware; Hull	3:37
19.	"Running" (Acoustic Version)	Ware; Bashmore; Baptista	3:56

Spotify Gold Edition bonus tracks
No.	Title	Length
20.	"Night Light" (Live from Spotify London)	3:35
21.	"Devotion" (Live from Spotify London)	3:08
22.	"Wildest Moments" (Live from Spotify London)	3:47
23.	"Running" (Live from Spotify London)	3:43

=== US version ===
No.	Title	Writer(s)	Producer(s)	Length
1.	"Devotion"	Jessie Ware; Dave Okumu	Dave Okumu	3:24
2.	"Wildest Moments"	Ware; Tom Hull	Kid Harpoon; Okumu	3:42
3.	"Running"	Ware; Julio Bashmore; Brey Baptista	Okumu; Bashmore	4:28
4.	"Still Love Me"	Ware; Okumu	Okumu	3:56
5.	"No to Love"	Okumu	Okumu	3:33
6.	"Night Light"	Ware; Hull; Okumu	Okumu; Kid Harpoon (add.)	4:13
7.	"Swan Song"	Ware; Okumu	Okumu	3:43
8.	"Sweet Talk"	Ware; Bashmore; Laura Dockrill	Okumu; Bashmore	3:37
9.	"If You're Never Gonna Move"	Ware; Bashmore	Bashmore	3:27
10.	"Taking in Water"	Ware; Hull	Okumu; Kid Harpoon	4:27
11.	"Something Inside"	Ware; Wilma Archer; Dockrill	Wilma Archer; Okumu	3:34
12.	"Imagine It Was Us"	Ware; Bashmore; Baptista; Dave Corney; James Napier	Bashmore	3:24
13.	"Wildest Moments" (Remix) (featuring A$AP Rocky)	Ware; Rakim Mayers; Hull	Kid Harpoon; Okumu	4:07

iTunes bonus track
No.	Title	Writer(s)	Producer(s)	Length
14.	"Wildest Moments" (Live at The Cherrytree House)	Ware; Hull	Kid Harpoon; Okumu	3:21

Amazon MP3 bonus track
No.	Title	Writer(s)	Producer(s)	Length
14.	"What You Won't Do for Love" (Live at The Cherrytree House)	Bobby Caldwell; Alfons Kettner	Ware; Sampha Sisay; Hassan Hamandi; Okumu	3:08

== Personnel ==
Credits for Devotion adapted from Barnes & Noble.

Performance credits

- Jessie Ware – primary artist, vocals
- Robin Mullarkey – cello
- Kid Harpoon – guitar, percussion, keyboards
- Lexxx – synthesizer bass
- Dave Okumu – synthesizer, bass, guitar, piano, drums, keyboards, background vocals, rap, finger snapping
- Wilma Archer – guitar, piano, percussion
- Leo Taylor – drums
- A. K. Paul – bass, guitar
- Robin McUllarkey – cello
- Dornik – background vocals

Technical credits

- Stuart Hawkes – mastering
- Lewis Hopkin – mastering
- Robin Mullarkey – programming, additional production
- Kid Harpoon – composer, programming, producer, engineer
- David Corney – composer
- David Emery – Pro-Tools
- Dave Okumu – composer, programming, producer, engineer, cello arrangement
- Julio Bashmore – composer, programming, producer, engineer
- Wilma Archer – composer, producer, engineer
- James Napier – composer
- Jessie Ware – composer
- Velour – producer
- Nigel Glasgow – engineer
- Breyner Baptista – composer
- Brendon Harding – engineer
- Laura Dockrill – composer
- Dan Vinci – engineer
- Rakim Mayers – composer

== Charts ==
=== Weekly charts ===
Weekly chart performance for Devotion
Chart (2012–13)	Peak position
Belgian Albums (Ultratop Flanders)	8
Belgian Albums (Ultratop Wallonia)	86
Croatian International Albums (HDU)	12
Danish Albums (Hitlisten)	38
Irish Albums (IRMA)	74
Norwegian Albums (VG-lista)	22
Polish Albums (ZPAV)	13
Scottish Albums (OCC)	20
Swiss Albums (Schweizer Hitparade)	59
UK Albums (OCC)	5
US Billboard 200	79

=== Year-end charts ===
2012 year-end chart performance for Devotion
Chart (2012)	Position
Belgian Albums (Ultratop Flanders)	93

2013 year-end chart performance for Devotion
Chart (2013)	Position
UK Albums (OCC)	195

== Certifications ==
Region	Certification	Certified units/sales
Poland (ZPAV)	Platinum	20,000^{*}
United Kingdom (BPI)	Gold	100,000^{*}
^{*} Sales figures based on certification alone.

== Release history ==
Region	Date	Label	Format(s)	Edition
United Kingdom	20 August 2012	PMR; Island	CD; LP; digital download	Devotion
United Kingdom	15 April 2013	PMR; Island	CD; LP; digital download	Devotion: The Gold Edition
United States	16 April 2013	Cherrytree; Interscope	CD; LP; digital download	Devotion: The Gold Edition
