= Pitchfork Music Festival Paris 2015 =

- Dates: 29–31 October 2015
- Locations: Grande halle de la Villette, Paris, France
- Website: pitchforkmusicfestival.fr

The Pitchfork Music Festival Paris 2015 was held from 29 to 31 October 2015 at the Grande halle de la Villette, Paris, France. It was broadcast live through Pitchfork's official website.

The festival was headlined by Beach House, Thom Yorke, and Ratatat.

== Lineup ==
Artists listed from latest to earliest set times.

| Thursday, 29 October | Friday, 30 October | Saturday, 31 October |
|---|---|---|
| Beach House; Deerhunter; Godspeed You! Black Emperor; Ariel Pink; Destroyer; Kirin J. Callinan; Hælos | Four Tet; Thom Yorke – Tomorrow's Modern Boxes (Note: In August 2015, Björk announced the cancellation of her upcoming tour dates, including the festival. She was replaced by Thom Yorke.); Battles; Kurt Vile & the Violators; Rhye; HEALTH; Rome Fortune; Dornik | Ratatat; Spiritualized; Run the Jewels; Unknown Mortal Orchestra; Father John Misty; Nao; Curtis Harding; Hinds |

=== Opening Night and Afterparties lineups ===
The opening night was held on 27 October 2015 in three venues, Café de la Danse, Badaboum, and Mécanique Ondulatoire. Pitchfork teamed up with Red Bull Music Academy Paris to host afterparties on 29 and 30 October at Le Trabendo and 31 October at the Grande halle de la Villette.

Opening Night
| Café de la Danse | Badaboum | Mécanique Ondulatoire |
|---|---|---|
| LA Priest; Empress Of; Børns | DJ Allie Teilz; Mura Masa; Moses Sumney (Note: Moses Sumney was added to the line-up, after Neon Indian cancelled their appearance due to unforeseen circumstances.); SG Lewis | Speedy Ortiz; Bully; Mild High Club |

Afterparties
| Thursday, 29 October | Friday, 30 October | Saturday, 31 October |
|---|---|---|
| Rustie; Nosaj Thing (Live); two; Gilligan Moss; Jade Statues; John Pope (Live); Keight | Omar S; Galcher Lustwerk; Andre Bratten (Live); Cosmo (Live); k2k | Laurent Garnier; John Talabot B2B Roman Flügel; Hudson Mohawke (Live) |
