= Selfish Love (Jessie Ware song) =

Single by Jessie Ware

from the album Glasshouse
- Written: December 2016
- Released: 31 August 2017
- Length: 3:54
- Label: Island
- Songwriters: Ross Golan; Benjamin Levin; Jessie Ware; Magnus August Høiberg; Nathan Perez; Ryan Tedder; Ammar Malik
- Producers: Happy Perez; Benny Blanco; Cashmere Cat

Jessie Ware singles chronology
"Midnight" (2017)	"Selfish Love" (2017)	"Alone" (2017)

Music video
- "Selfish Love" on YouTube

"Selfish Love" is a song by British singer-songwriter Jessie Ware. It was written by Ware, Ross Golan, Ryan Tedder, Ammar Malik, Benny Blanco, Cashmere Cat and Happy Perez, with production handled by the latter three. The song was released via Island Records on 31 August 2017, as the second single from the singer-songwriter's third studio album, Glasshouse (2017).

== Background ==
The song premiered on Zane Lowe's Beats 1 radio show. Ware told Lowe on the show that the song was written during "a frustrating songwriting session" with Benny Blanco in December 2016, and she was starting to worry that she "couldn't write another song now that [she] was a mom and [she] was tired." Blanco later played a voice note on his phone of an idea he and Ryan Tedder "messed about with last week", it featured Tedder singing the chorus on the acoustic guitar. "I was like, 'This is incredible. Please, can we work with this?' It feels [like] Sade, it feels like we can make it a bit D'Angelo," she said. Ware said of the song in a press release: "'Selfish Love' is a track that reminds me why I enjoy singing so much. Even though it's coming at the end of the summer, I hope you play it in the heat." In an interview with London Evening Standard, Ware said: "We took the reverb away, which was quite scary until I realised that people quite liked it. There wasn't so much focus on the production, which was how it was led before. There are still electronics, to make it feel modern, but I really tried to home in on becoming a better songwriter. The songs came first."

== Critical reception ==
Noisey Staff of Vice called the song "a more sultry affair, ditching the tension or soulful stomp of 'Midnight' in favor of an smoldering slow samba". They regarded it as a reworking of Moloko's 1998 single "Sing It Back", and wrote that "the lyrics are all Lana Del Rey-esque". Owen Myers of The Fader thinks the song "would make a steamy soundtrack to a heated summer romance in the Basque". Derrick Rossignol of Uproxx felt the song "slows things down for a smoother, sexier, and bass-carried vibe with a distinct Latin flair". Tom Breihan of Stereogum called it "a coldly flirty song about an emotionally distant dude, with a bit of a bossa nova lilt".

== Music video ==
The video was directed by Tom Beard and set in Majorca, and is a prequel to the visual for "Midnight". It was described as the first of a two-part story, with the "Midnight" video being the second. Ware played the role of one half of a couple in a strained relationship with the dishonest man, who has been cheating on her, as they spend time in a luxurious property.

== Track listing ==
Digital download
No.	Title	Length
1.	"Selfish Love"	3:54

Digital download – Acoustic
No.	Title	Length
1.	"Selfish Love" (acoustic)	3:47

Digital download – Spanish version
No.	Title	Length
1.	"Egoísta"	3:55

== Credits and personnel ==
Credits adapted from Tidal.

- Jessie Ware – songwriting, vocals
- Ross Golan – songwriting, additional vocals
- Benny Blanco – songwriting, production, keyboard, programming
- Cashmere Cat – songwriting, production, keyboard, programming
- Happy Perez – songwriting, production, keyboard, guitar, programming
- Ryan Tedder – songwriting
- Ammar Malik – songwriting, additional vocals
- Induce – mastering engineering
- David Schwerkolt – engineering
- Pino Palladino – bass guitar
- Morgan Stratton – assistant recording engineering
- Chris Dave – drums
- David Okumu – guitar
- Spike Stent – mixing

== Charts ==
Chart (2017)	Peak position
Slovakia (Rádio Top 100)	97

== Release history ==
Region	Date	Format	Version	Label	Ref.
Various	31 August 2017	Digital download	Original	Island	
Various	8 September 2017	Digital download	Acoustic	Island	
Canada	29 September 2017	Digital download	Spanish version	PMR; Island; Friends Keep Secrets; Interscope	
