= Majestyy =

Musical project of Brian Jacobs

- Origin: Brooklyn, New York, United States
- Genres: Electropop, pop, dance
- Years active: 2012 -- present
- Members: Brian Jacobs
- Website: Majestyy

Majestyy is the solo project of Brian Jacobs. Formed in 2012 following the breakup of the previous band he led, Apes & Androids, Majestyy is a recording project. Jacobs also occasionally DJs under the name.
