= Midnight (Jessie Ware song) =

2017 Jessie Ware song

Single by Jessie Ware

from the album Glasshouse
- Released: 28 July 2017
- Genre: Pop; soul
- Length: 3:19
- Label: Island
- Songwriters: Andrew "Pop" Wansel; Kiah Victoria; Jessie Ware; Bastian Langebaek; Jordan Thomas
- Producer: Bastian Langebaek

Jessie Ware singles chronology
"Champagne Kisses" (2015)	"Midnight" (2017)	"Selfish Love" (2017)

Music video
- "Midnight" on YouTube

"Midnight" is a song by British singer-songwriter Jessie Ware. It was written by Pop Wansel, Kiah Victoria, Jessie Ware, Jordan Thomas and Bastian Langebaek, with production handled by the latter one. The song was released via Island Records on 28 July 2017, as the lead single from the singer-songwriter's third studio album, Glasshouse (2017).

== Background ==
Ware first revealed the details of the song during a live performance in London on 2 July 2017. She released a snippet of the song on 25 and 27 July 2017 respectively. On 27 July 2017, Ware debuted the song via Annie Mac's self-titled radio show on BBC Radio 1, and was named as Mac's "hottest record in the world". The track was described as "fantasy mixed with complete and utter desire" in the press release. Ware said "Midnight" "is the song I've always wanted to be able to sing but perhaps didn't have the confidence until now".

== Critical reception ==
Christopher Roberts of Under the Radar opined that "the strong production and Ware's powerhouse vocals elevate "Midnight" to a superior pop song". Joanna Agwanda of Uproxx felt that the song "highlights Ware's amazing vocal ability". Robin Murray of Clash opined that the song is "a storming piece of modern soul". Michelle Geslani of Consequence of Sound wrote: "Equal parts confessional, haunting, and elegant, it finds Ware reflecting on her relationship with her husband." Mike Wass of Idolator described the song as a "soulful anthem" and an "instantly catchy tack", as well as "a record for adults that explores the initial rush of new love and sounds very much like a throwback to another era". Hafeezah Nazim of Nylon wrote that the song "is laden with soaring falsettos that echo Maxwell's "This Woman's Work" over a piano-driven production". Sam Murphy of The Interns wrote that Ware "pushed vocally more than she ever has before" and "revealed even further the strength in her voice" with the song, and regarded it as "a classy, elegant affair". Jamie Milton DIY wrote that the song "starts off as a fragile, skeletal number with hazy ethereal synths, but soon develops into a full-on soul stomper, with confident piano chords and percussion". Megan Reynolds of Jezebel opined that the single is "not much of a departure from her typical ethereal heartbreak jams, but still a good one".

== Track listing ==
Digital download
No.	Title	Length
1.	"Midnight"	3:19

Digital download – Acoustic
No.	Title	Length
1.	"Midnight" (Acoustic)	3:56

Digital download – Goldie Remixes
No.	Title	Length
1.	"Midnight" (Goldie Remix)	4:37
2.	"Midnight" (Goldie Epic Mix)	7:20
3.	"Midnight" (Goldie Remix) (Radio Edit)	3:38

Digital download – Peggy Gou's After Midnight Mix
No.	Title	Length
1.	"Midnight" (Peggy Gou's After Midnight Mix)	5:46

== Credits and personnel ==
Credits adapted from Tidal.

- Jessie Ware – writing, vocals
- Pop Wansel – writing, co-producing, programming
- Kiah Victoria – writing, background vocals, vocal arranging
- Bastian Langebaek – writing, producing, engineering, keyboard, background vocals, programming, vocal arranging
- Jordan Thomas – writing, engineering, background vocals, vocal arranging
- Induce – mastering engineering
- Jack Chown – engineering
- Brendon Harding – engineering
- Joseph Gallagher – engineering
- Spike Stent – mixing

== Charts ==
Chart (2017)	Peak position
Poland Airplay (ZPAV)	53
Scottish Singles Sales (Official Charts)	69
UK Singles (Official Charts)	89

== Release history ==
Region	Date	Format	Version	Label	Ref.
Various	28 July 2017	Digital download	Original	Island	
Various	18 August 2017	Digital download	Acoustic	Island	
Various	22 August 2017	Digital download	Goldie Remixes	Island	
Various	22 September 2017	Digital download	Peggy Gou's After Midnight Mix	Island	
