= Aeris Roves =

- Born: Kyle Miller; 1997 (age 28–29)
- Genres: R&B; Soul
- Years active: 2017–present
- Label: RCA
- Website: www.aerisroves.com

Aeris Roves, real name Kyle Miller, is a singer, songwriter, and guitarist from Worksop, South Yorkshire, England, but now based in London. He is signed to RCA Records.

== Early life ==
As a child he sang in a choir. He moved to London aged 11, performed in a school production at the O2 Arena, and taught himself to play his father's old guitar. Rather than contemporary pop, he grew up listening to soul music – The Drifters, The Temptations, Roy Orbison, Frank Ocean, etc.

He studied economics and maths in college but quit to go to East London Arts & Music for sixth form. He started writing songs in his last year at ELAM and learned production in its studio.

A chance meeting with his now manager occurred when a fellow student was looking for a guitarist for one of her college shows. She connected him with producer Two Inch Punch, who took on a mentor role and worked with him on his tracks almost from the beginning.

== Stage name ==
He adopted his stage name from the Latin word 'Aeris' (atmosphere) plus 'Roves' to suggest travelling.

== Career ==
He released his debut track "Best Dressed Man" in March 2018, followed by "Feel Me", which netted more than four million streams on Spotify.

In 2018 he signed with RCA Records and opened for Billie Eilish on her nine-day European tour. In the Fall of that year he toured with Grace Carter in Europe and the UK.

In November 2018 He released his debut project, Moon By Island Gardens, named after a park on the Isle of Dogs. It featured contributions from Two Inch Punch, Mssingo, and John Calvert. The single 'Delilah' premiered on Zane Lowe's Beats 1 show and subsequently was streamed more than five million times on Spotify.

In March 2019 he performed with Take That at a Teenage Cancer Trust show at the Royal Albert Hall, and in October 2019 at the Neighborhood Festival in Manchester.

He released the single "Don't Ask" on 16 May 2019 and on 16 August 2019, he released the single "Offline".
