= Apes & Androids =

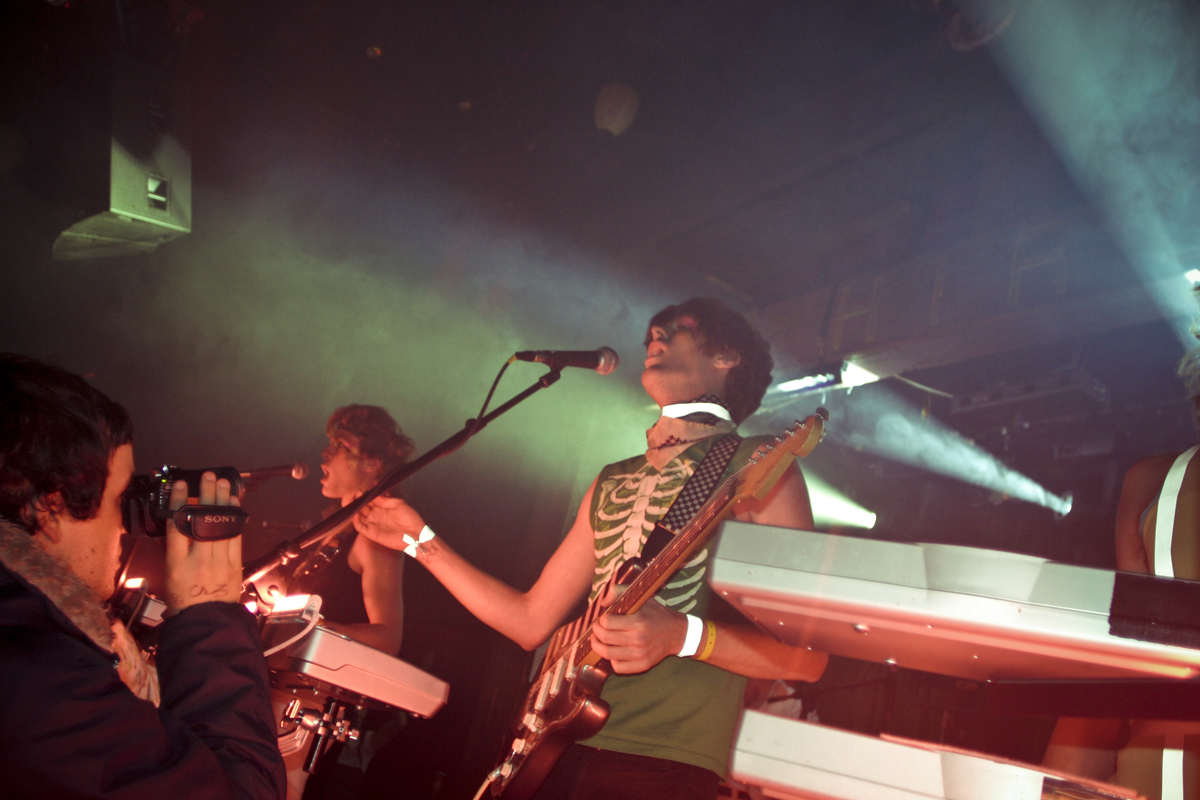

Background information
- Origin: Brooklyn, New York City, United States
- Genres: Electropop, glam rock, dance
- Years active: 2008–2009
- Labels: Isomorph
- Members: Brian Jacobs; David Tobias; Eric Davis; Morgan Whirledge; Pablo Lopez-Douzoglo; Andy Markham
- Website: Apes and Androids

Apes & Androids was an American electropop band formed in 2007 and based in Brooklyn. It includes former members of Call Florence Pow. The band became known for its extravagant live shows which included dancers dressed as zombies, and their mix of glam rock and electropop. Their debut album Blood Moon was released in 2008.

Apes & Androids disbanded in 2009.

Some members of the band went on to create solo projects. Most notably Chrome Canyon (Morgan Whirledge) and Majestyy (Brian Jacobs).

== Discography ==
=== Albums ===
- Blood Moon (2008)

=== Singles ===
- "Golden Prize" b/w "Riverside" 7" (Isomorph 2008)
