= Imagine It Was Us =

Single by Jessie Ware

from the album Devotion
- Released: 12 April 2013
- Recorded: 2011
- Genre: Dance-pop
- Length: 3:24
- Label: Island
- Songwriters: Jessie Ware; Julio Bashmore; Brey Baptista; Dave Corney; James Napier
- Producers: Julio Bashmore; Velour (add.)

Jessie Ware singles chronology
"Sweet Talk" (2013)	"Imagine It Was Us" (2013)	"Tough Love" (2014)

"Imagine It Was Us" is a song recorded by British singer-songwriter Jessie Ware for the re-release of her debut studio album, titled Devotion – The Gold Edition. The song was released in the United Kingdom as a digital download on 12 April 2013. The song was written by Ware, Julio Bashmore, Brey Baptista, Dave "Hyetal" Corney and James "Jimmy Napes" Napier. The song peaked at number 105 on the UK Singles Chart.

== Music video ==
A music video to accompany the release of "Imagine It Was Us" was first released onto YouTube on 7 April 2013 at a total length of three minutes and thirty-four seconds.

== Track listing ==
Digital download
No.	Title	Length
1.	"Imagine It Was Us"	3:24

== Charts ==
Chart (2013)	Peak position
Belgium (Ultratip Bubbling Under Flanders)	15
Belgium (Ultratip Bubbling Under Wallonia)	40
France (SNEP)	148
UK Singles (Official Charts Company)	105

== Release history ==
Region	Date	Format	Label
United Kingdom	12 April 2013	Digital download	Island
