= Tough Love (Jessie Ware album) =

2014 studio album by Jessie Ware

Studio album by Jessie Ware
- Released: 13 October 2014
- Genre: Pop; R&B; electronica
- Length: 40:21
- Label: PMR; Island; Interscope
- Producer: BenZel; James Ford; Dave Okumu; Dev Hynes; Emile Haynie; Julio Bashmore; Nineteen85

Jessie Ware chronology
If You're Never Gonna Move (2013)	Tough Love (2014)	Glasshouse (2017)

Jessie Ware studio album chronology
Devotion (2012)	Tough Love (2014)	Glasshouse (2017)

Singles from Tough Love
- 1. "Tough Love" Released: 23 June 2014; 2. "Say You Love Me" Released: 28 September 2014; 3. "You & I (Forever)" Released: 12 January 2015; 4. "Champagne Kisses" Released: 20 April 2015

Tough Love is the second studio album by British singer-songwriter Jessie Ware. It was released on 13 October 2014 in the United Kingdom and 24 October 2014 in the United States.

Well-received, the album was widely praised for its sophisticated blend of pop and R&B, showcasing Ware's vocals, songwriting, and emotional depth, though some critics found it less stimulating or overly mainstream. Commercially, Tough Love peaked at number nine on the UK Albums Chart and was certified Gold by the British Phonographic Industry (BPI) for sales over 100,000 units. Internationally, it reached number six in Poland, where it was later certified double platinum, and entered the top 20 in Ireland.

Tough Love was supported by four singles, including the tile track, which became Ware's first UK top 40 hit at number 34, and follow-up "Say You Love Me," which became her biggest hit, peaking at number 22. In further promotion of the album, Ware embarked on the Tough Love World Tour, her third concert tour, from September to October 2014.

== Background ==
At the beginning of 2014, Ware returned to the studio to write her second album. Ed Sheeran confirmed in an interview with Daily Star that they had written a song together for the new album. (The song, "Say You Love Me", was released on 13 August 2014.) "Tough Love" is the first single to be taken from the new album, airing for the first time on BBC Radio 1 as "Hottest Record" during the Zane Lowe's show and slated for a UK release on 3 August 2014. "Tough Love" was compared to "Prince at his minimalist '80s best" by Pitchfork, who interviewed Ware prior to the release. "Tough Love" is produced together with BenZel, the production duo composed of London post-bass producer Two Inch Punch and mega-producer Benny Blanco who Ware previously worked with on the single "If You Love Me"; Benzel are also executive producers of her new album. Kid Harpoon, Dave Okumu, Julio Bashmore, Miguel, James Ford, Nineteen85, Sam Smith and Ed Sheeran also worked on the new album.

== Singles ==
"Tough Love", produced by BenZel, was released as the lead single from the album on 23 June 2014. The song peaked to number 34 on the UK Singles Chart, making it her first top 40 single in the UK. "Say You Love Me" was released as the second single from the album on 28 September 2014 and became her second top 40 hit, charting at number 22. "You & I (Forever)" was released as the third single from the album. The video for the song was released on 2 December 2014 and was directed by Adam Powell. London-born producer Shift K3Y and Kidnap Kid remixed the track. On 17 January 2015, Ware confirmed on her Twitter account that the fourth single to be released from the album would be "Champagne Kisses". Chris Sweeney directed the video, which was published on Ware's YouTube account on 11 February 2015.

== Critical reception ==
Professional ratings
Aggregate scores
Source	Rating
Metacritic	74/100
Review scores
Source	Rating
AllMusic	3/5 stars
The A.V. Club	A−
Consequence of Sound	C
Fact	2/5 stars
The Guardian	3/5 stars
NME	7/10
Pitchfork	7.3/10
PopMatters	8/10
Rolling Stone	3.5/5 stars
Slant Magazine	4/5 stars

Upon its release, Tough Love received generally positive reviews from music critics. According to Metacritic, which assigns a weighted average score out of 100 to ratings and reviews from mainstream critics, the album received an average of 74, indicating "generally favorable reviews", based on 26 critics. David Brusie of The A.V. Club graded the album an A−, describing it as a "more than worthy" follow-up to Ware's debut album Devotion, while highlighting Ware's strengths as a singer and songwriter. In her review for Pitchfork, Jill Mapes noted that "rarely does a major-label pop singer sound as tasteful as Ware does, especially while avoiding the sleepy trappings of adult contemporary. At its best, Ware's music sounds truly exciting without sounding as if it's trying too hard to come across that way."

At PopMatters, Colin Fitzgerald rated Tough Love eight discs out of ten, noting that Ware has "gone the correct route", while highlighting the album's pop and R&B sounds of "Kind of... Sometimes... Maybe" and the minimistical ballad "Keep on Lying". NME critic David Renshaw found that Tough Love "excels [...] while collaborations with Dev Hynes and Miguel save the latter half from drifting too far into languid MOR ballad territory." Similarly, Paula Mejia, writing for Rolling Stone, noted that Tough Love had "plenty of showcases for Ware's acrobatic vocals [...] and when A-list modern-soul auteurs including Dev Hynes and Miguel lend their talents, they only complement the strengths that Ware continues to refine within herself."

Guardian critic Caroline Sullivan gave a positive review of the album, calling it "sensual and intriguing," while describing the album's content as a "boneless elegance" with "premium product." Exclaim!'s Cam Lindsay called Tough Love a "tour de force album, one that nails heartache with sophistication and class," while Andy Baber from MusicOMH wrote that "for the most part, it is an assured collection of songs that exudes the confidence of an artist at the peak of her powers." AllMusic editor Andy Kellman rated the album three stars out of five, claiming that Tough Love has the same "high level of sophistication" as Devotion, but with "less stimulating results." In a negative review, Fact's Josh Hall called the album "functional, designed to break her into the mainstream proper."

== Chart performance ==
In the United Kingdom, Tough Love debuted and peaked at number nine on the UK Albums Chart in the week of 25 October 2014, becoming Ware's second top ten album. It would remain 18 weeks on the chart. The album was certified Silver by the British Phonographic Industry (BPI) on 17 July 2015 and reached Gold status on 4 June 2021 after surpassing sales in excess of 100,000 copies. In April 2023, Music Week reported that the album had sold 108,839 units in the United Kingdom. The album also reached number 11 on the Scottish Albums Chart.

Outside the United Kingdom, Tough Love achieved its highest peak in Poland, reaching number six on the Polish Albums Chart, and was subsequently certified double platinum by ZPAV for sales of 40,000 units. In Ireland, the album peaked at number 14 on the Irish Albums Chart. In Belgium, it reached number 29 on the Ultratop Flanders Albums Chart. Further afield, Tough Love reached number 32 on the New Zealand Albums Chart, number 36 on the ARIA Albums Chart in Australia, and number 50 on the Billboard 200 in the United States.

== Track listing ==
Tough Love – Standard edition
No.	Title	Writer(s)	Producer(s)	Length
1.	"Tough Love"	Jessie Ware; Benny Blanco; Ben Ash	BenZel	3:26
2.	"You & I (Forever)"	Ware; Blanco; Ash; Miguel Pimentel	BenZel	3:58
3.	"Cruel"	Ware; James Ford; Dave Okumu	Okumu; Ford	3:52
4.	"Say You Love Me"	Ware; Blanco; Ash; Edward Christopher Sheeran	BenZel	4:17
5.	"Sweetest Song"	Ware; Okumu; Sam Dew	Okumu	3:27
6.	"Kind of… Sometimes… Maybe"	Ware; Blanco; Ash; Pimentel	BenZel	3:34
7.	"Want Your Feeling"	Ware; Dev Hynes	Ford; Hynes	4:21
8.	"Pieces"	Ware; James Napier; Dante Hemingway; William Phillips	Emile Haynie	3:25
9.	"Keep on Lying"	Ware; Dew; Matthew Walker	Julio Bashmore	3:28
10.	"Champagne Kisses"	Ware; Blanco; Ash	BenZel	3:22
11.	"Desire"	Ware; Paul Jefferies; Tom Hull; Daniel Daley; Mitchum Chin	Nineteen85	3:11

Tough Love – Deluxe version (bonus tracks)
No.	Title	Writer(s)	Producer(s)	Length
12.	"All on You"	Ware; Okumu; Dew	Okumu	5:13
13.	"Share It All"	Ware; Romy Madley Croft	Julio Bashmore	4:18
14.	"The Way We Are"	Ware; Napier; Ford	Ford	3:29
15.	"Midnight Caller"	Ware; Ford	Ford	4:38

Notes

- "Say You Love Me" features additional vocals by Ed Sheeran.
- "Kind of… Sometimes… Maybe" features additional vocals by Miguel Pimentel.

== Personnel ==
Credits for Tough Love adapted from AllMusic.

- Benjamin Ash – background vocals
- Julio Bashmore – production
- BenZel – instrumentation, production, programming
- Daniel Butman – violin
- Jonny Byers – cello
- Gillon Cameron – violin
- Mitchum Chin – guitar
- Alex Cowper – design
- Calina de la Mare – violin
- Sam Dew – background vocals
- Alison Dods – violin
- Mikky Ekko – background vocals
- Blake Espy – violin
- Glenn Fischbach – cello
- James Ford – engineering, keyboards, percussion, production, synthesizer, background vocals
- Larry Gold – string arrangements
- Vincent Greene – viola
- Brendon Harding – engineering, vocal engineering
- Emile Haynie – production
- Dante Hemingway - programming, mixing, assistant engineering
- Sally Herbert – violin
- Lewis Hopkin – mastering, mastering engineer
- Devonté Hynes – additional production, guitar
- Paul Jefferies – bass, drums, guitar
- Jonathan Kim – viola
- Rick Koster – violin
- Emma Kummrow – violin
- Oliver Langford – viola
- Jennifer Lee – violin
- Andrew Levin – background vocals
- Jeremy Levin – background vocals
- Lexxx – mixing
- Vicky Matthews – cello
- Luigi Mazzocchi – violin
- Laura Melhuish – violin
- Miguel – guitar, background vocals
- Nineteen85 – production
- Dave Okumu – bass, drum programming, guitar, keyboards, production, programming, synthesizer, background vocals
- Phillip A. Peterson – cello, string arrangements
- Tom Pigott-Smith – violin
- Kate Robinson – violin
- Sampha – background vocals
- Chris Sclafani – engineering, bass guitar, background vocals
- Ed Sheeran – background vocals
- Julia Singleton – violin
- Bradford H. Smith – assistant engineering
- Robert Spriggs – viola
- Mark "Spike" Stent – mixing
- Geoff Swan – assembly, assistance
- Leo Taylor – drums
- Annemarieke Van Drimmelen – photography
- Matthew Walker – composition
- Jessie Ware – composition, vocals
- Lucy Wilkins – violin
- Aryn Wüthrich – background vocals

== Charts ==
Chart performance for Tough Love
Chart (2014–2015)	Peak position
Australian Albums (ARIA)	36
Belgian Albums (Ultratop Flanders)	29
Belgian Albums (Ultratop Wallonia)	61
French Albums (SNEP)	172
German Albums (Offizielle Top 100)	71
Irish Albums (IRMA)	14
New Zealand Albums (RMNZ)	32
Polish Albums (ZPAV)	6
Scottish Albums (OCC)	11
Swiss Albums (Schweizer Hitparade)	40
UK Albums (OCC)	9
US Billboard 200	50

== Certifications ==
Certifications for Tough Love
Region	Certification	Certified units/sales
Poland (ZPAV)	2× Platinum	40,000^{‡}
United Kingdom (BPI)	Gold	100,000^{‡}
United States	—	6,000
^{‡} Sales+streaming figures based on certification alone.

== Release history ==
Release history and formats for Tough Love
Region	Date	Label	Format(s)	Edition
United Kingdom	13 October 2014	PMR; Island	CD; LP; digital download	Standard; deluxe
United States	24 October 2014	Cherrytree; Interscope	CD; LP; digital download	Standard; deluxe
