= PMR Records =

United Kingdom-based record label

- Location: London, England
- Official website: pmrrecords.com

PMR Records was an independent record label founded in 2011 by Ben and Daniel Parmar that merged into Big Family Music in 2025. Initially known for local dance/electronic music culture, PMR was involved in the early development of Disclosure, Jessie Ware, Ruti, and Jamie Woon, who went on to mainstream success. It also managed specialist dance and electronic acts such as Julio Bashmore and T. Williams.

== History ==
=== Formation ===
Following a stint in A&R at Universal's Polydor, Ben left to manage Jai Paul. Ben persuaded his brother Daniel to join him in launching his own business venture, and PMR was born. Its first ‘office’ was their family living room in Acton, West London.

They took on Bristol DJ and producer Julio Bashmore for management. After putting out some singles on different independent labels, they released them through PMR, with January 2011's Everyone Needs A Theme Tune EP marking its first home release, and spawning UK club hit ‘Battle For Middle You’.

Initially run in partnership with Island Records, early signings to the PMR roster included individuals such as Rinse FM DJs' L-Vis 1990 and T Williams, South London singer Jessie Ware, and the electronic music duo Disclosure.

=== Early years success ===
Ben met up with singer Jessie Ware after hearing her demo. They began working on material with producer Dave Okumu (former frontman of The Invisible). During that time, she was introduced by PMR to Julio Bashmore, a creative partnership that spawned the critically acclaimed track ‘110% / If You’re Never Gonna Move’, which ended up on her album. Released August 2012 on PMR / Island, her album Devotion peaked at No.5 on the Official UK Album Chart and was nominated for the Mercury Prize. Follow-up album Tough Love was released in October 2014 and peaked at No.9 in the UK, as well as entering the Top 50 of the Billboard 200.

Ware was tipping the duo Disclosure, and after remixing her track 'Running', they signed to PMR. They sent over a track they had called 'Latch', featuring singer Sam Smith. It was released in October 2012 as the lead single from Disclosure's debut studio album Settle. ‘Latch’ peaked at No.11 on the Official UK Singles Chart and spent 55 weeks in the Top 100. The song helped bring wider recognition to Smith, Disclosure, and songwriter Jimmy Napes. ‘Latch’ charted at No.7 on the US Billboard Hot 100 chart in 2014. Follow-up singles charted high in the UK with ‘White Noise’ No.2, ‘You & Me’ No.10, and F for U (later featuring Mary J. Blige) at No.20.

Settle was released in summer 2013 and debuted at No.1 on the Official UK Album Chart and remained in the Top 100 for 67 weeks. It went on to secure a Mercury Prize nomination and platinum status in the UK. Disclosure's second album Caracal also debuted at No.1 in the UK, went Top 10 on the Billboard 200 chart, and No.1 on Billboard's Dance/Electronic Chart. It received a 2016 Grammy Awards nomination for Best Dance/Electronic Album and was critically lauded, appearing in Top Albums of 2015 lists at Mixmag, Noisey and Slant Magazine.

In 2014, PMR launched a sub-label, Beat Club. A home to newer talent as its parent label reached wider success, Beat Club's first release, ‘People/Oh No,’ was from Polish producer Klaves. It was also home to the first release from SG Lewis, the track 'Warm'.

=== 2015–2021 ===
In 2015, PMR managed artists such as Two Inch Punch and Jessie Ware, and co-managed Dornik.

PMR continued its global partnership with Universal Music Group, with global marketing, sales, and distribution services available from the likes of Virgin EMI and Caroline International.

In 2019, the Parmar brothers were appointed co-presidents of A&R at Virgin EMI (soon to be EMI Records)

In 2021, the Parmars achieved success at EMI with TikTok-turned-UK-chart stars A1 x J1 and rising popstar Bree Runway.

=== 2022–2025 ===
In recent years, PMR refocused producer/writer/remixer SG Lewis as a headline artist with his record becoming the ninth-biggest debut album on Spotify on launch (and saw 25k tickets sold for his US tour). New York's Amber Mark released her full-length debut via PMR/Interscope to critical acclaim.

Master Peace supported The Streets and Nova Twins live, the music video for his track ‘Country Life’ won a British Short Film Award, and he was nominated as 'One To Watch in association with BBC Music Introducing' at the 2023 AIM Association of Independent Music Awards.

In June 2023, Ruti's MixTea_MilkTape! was released, including a collaboration with GuiltyBeatz.

In February 2025, PMR merged with Big Family to become Big Family Music.

== Roster ==
As of summer 2024, the core PMR roster consisted of:

- Amber Mark
- Hope Tala
- Master Peace
- Obed Padilla
- Ruti
- SG Lewis

PMR alumni include Disclosure, Jessie Ware, Jai Paul, Georgia & David Jackson ('Get Me Higher'), Jamie Woon, Julio Bashmore, T.Williams, Two Inch Punch, Couros, Cyril Hahn, Dornik, Girli, Javeon, Klaves, L-Vis 1990, Meridian Dan ('German Whip').
