= If You're Never Gonna Move =

Single by Jessie Ware

from the album Devotion
- B-side: "Sweet Talk"; "Devotion"; "What You Won't Do for Love"
- Released: 13 April 2012
- Recorded: 2011
- Genre: Synth-pop; R&B; electronic
- Length: 3:27
- Label: PMR; Island
- Songwriters: Ware; Julio Bashmore
- Producer: Julio Bashmore

Jessie Ware singles chronology
| "Running" (2012) | "If You're Never Gonna Move" (2012) | "Wildest Moments" (2012) |

Jessie Ware album chronology
| Spotify Sessions (Live from Spotify London) (2013) | If You're Never Gonna Move (2013) | Tough Love (2014) |

"If You're Never Gonna Move" is a song recorded by British singer-songwriter Jessie Ware for her debut studio album Devotion. The synth-pop and R&B track was co-written by Ware and UK producer Julio Bashmore, which originally contained a sample from "The Big Shatterer" by the late American rapper Big Pun under its original title, "110%". Upon its release in the United States, however, the song was re-titled to "If You're Never Gonna Move", due to Big Pun's estate not granting clearance for the use of the sample. It was released as the second single from Devotion on 13 April 2012 as a digital download in the United Kingdom, and later in the United States as an extended play on 15 January 2013 via Cherrytree Records, eventually became the first single from Devotion in the States.

Upon its release, the song received critical acclaim from music critics for both its downbeat, R&B-infected production and Ware's "weightless" vocal, further stated the song as an "understated offering" from its parental album. Pitchfork eventually named "If You're Never Gonna Move" as the 61st best song of 2012, and later the 134th best song of their number sixty-one on their mid-decade list. It also achieved bigger commercial success for Ware in the United Kingdom, becoming her first single to enter the top 100 on the UK Singles Chart, and later the highest-charting single from Devotion by peaking at number 41. The song was also the singer's second consecutive top-twenty entry on the Belgium Ultratip Flanders chart, peaking at number twenty.

== Background and release ==
Following the release of "Running" – which was Ware's first solo single in 2012, "110%" was released as the second digital single from her then-upcoming album on 13 April 2012 by PMR Records, and later as a limited 7" vinyl single on 11 June 2012. In an interview with The Guardian on 18 August 2012, Ware revealed that she originally wanted to create "clubbier numbers" for her debut project, which eventually saw the singer approaching producer Julio Bashmore for a recording session. According to the singer herself, their session was "awkward" at first due to both Ware and Bashmore being "new" to writing a pop song. The duo then started "flicking" through a hip-hop magazine, eventually alighting on an image of late Puerto Rican–American rapper Big Pun in a "yellow PVC suit" while sitting on a throne. It eventually became an inspiration for Ware to write "110%", and the singer was "thrilled" when Big Pun's estate gave the permission to use a sample from the late rapper throughout the track. During her first US gig at New York City's The Box Monday night, however, the singer announced that the title would be changed to "If You're Never Gonna Move" instead, due to a dispute over the sample used in the track. It was eventually released on 15 January 2013 as a five-track extended play by Cherrytree Records, containing the eponymous album track "Devotion", "Sweet Talk" and her cover version of "What You Won't Do for Love", originally recorded and released as a single by American singer-songwriter Bobby Caldwell in 1978.

== Composition ==
"If You're Never Gonna Move" was written by Ware and fellow UK house producer Julio Bashmore, whom also produced her previous single "Running" and two more tracks for Devotion. Characterized as a "downbeat, R&B-infected" electronica track, the song was written in the D major key with a tempo of 101 beat-per-minute, and runs a total length of three minutes and twenty-seven seconds. According to Ware, she was inspired to write a song "about a girl trying to get him off his throne and dance" after seeing an image of Big Pun in a hip-hop magazine, which resulted in a "gorgeously restrained summer smash." Originally titled "110%", which was a reference to Pun's song "100%", the song originally contained a distorted line "carving my initials on your forehead" throughout the track, but was later changed to "Always on a mission like a warhead".

== Critical reception ==
Following its initial release, the song received critical acclaim from music critics. Priya Elan, Assistant Editor of NME gave the song a positive review stating, "Ware’s sizzled out Sade-like dubstep has had a baby with electro-pop – and it’s called ‘110%’. Drifting and driving over a Little Dragon-like beat, it bops about like sprinkles of heaven against a blessed-out backing. The whole thing feels very Robyn-like in its simple pop beauty. And that can only be a good thing." In 2014, Pitchfork named the track the 134th best of the decade so far and stated that "it's a testament to the inherent strengths of Ware's affably weightless voice and Bashmore's skipping production that [the removal of the Big Pun sample] had zero effect on the lasting power of "110%" and its winsome dance-pop."

== Music video ==
To further promote the song, an accompanied music video was uploaded onto YouTube on 16 April 2012. The video was directed by Kate Moross and filmed at Painshill Park, featuring Ware wandering around the park while singing the song, eventually driving away with her partner. Due to the aforementioned dispute, the video was re-titled accordingly to the new release, but remained the original sample line.

== Chart performance ==
The song did not chart upon its initial digital release. It then later debuted at number ninety-eight on the UK Singles Chart for the week of 26 May 2012, becoming her first top 100 entry as a solo artist. The song then re-entered at number sixty-one and charted for two weeks in early June 2012, and later reached number forty-one under its new title on the week of 9 February 2013, where it peaked for one week. The song is, to date, her second longest-running entry on the chart, and eventually her fifth biggest song in the United Kingdom as of 2020, according to the Official Charts Company. Elsewhere, "If You're Never Gonna Move" attained moderate success on the Belgium Ultratip Flanders chart, peaking at number twenty for one week and stayed for six weeks, becoming her second consecutive top-twenty entry after "Running".

== Track listing ==
Digital download and vinyl release
| No. | Title | Length |
|---|---|---|
| 1. | "110%" | 3:27 |

US extended play
| No. | Title | Length |
|---|---|---|
| 1. | "If You're Never Gonna Move" | 3:27 |
| 2. | "Sweet Talk" | 3:37 |
| 3. | "Devotion" | 3:24 |
| 4. | "What You Won't Do for Love" | 3:27 |
| 5. | "If You're Never Gonna Move" (Two Inch Punch Remix) | 3:23 |
| Total length: | | 17:18 |

== Charts ==
=== Single ===
Chart performance for "If You're Never Gonna Move" single
| Chart (2012–2013) | Peak position |
|---|---|
| Belgium (Ultratip Flanders) | 20 |
| UK Singles (Official Charts Company) | 41 |

=== Extended play ===
Chart performance for "If You're Never Gonna Move" EP
| Chart (2013) | Peak position |
|---|---|
| US Heatseekers Albums (Billboard) | 11 |

== Release history ==
Release history and formats for "If You're Never Gonna Move"
| Region | Date | Format | Label |
|---|---|---|---|
| United Kingdom | 13 April 2012 | Digital download | PMR; Island |
| United Kingdom | 11 June 2012 | 7" vinyl record, CDR | PMR; Island |
| United States | 15 January 2013 | Extended play | Cherrytree |
