= Say You Love Me (Jessie Ware song) =

Single by Jessie Ware

from the album Tough Love
- Released: 28 September 2014
- Recorded: 2013
- Genre: Pop; soul
- Length: 4:17
- Label: Island
- Songwriters: Jessie Ware; Ed Sheeran; Benny Blanco; Ben Ash
- Producer: BenZel

Jessie Ware singles chronology
"Tough Love" (2014)	"Say You Love Me" (2014)	"You & I (Forever)" (2015)

"Say You Love Me" is a song by British singer-songwriter Jessie Ware from her second studio album, Tough Love (2014). The song was released in the United Kingdom as a digital download on 28 September 2014 as the second single from the album. The song was written by Ware, Ed Sheeran, Benny Blanco and Ben Ash. Sheeran also provided uncredited vocals for the track.

== Music video ==
The official music video for the song was released on 11 September 2014 in Ware's YouTube account and was directed by collective Tell No One. The video features Ware with a black dress, barefoot and sitting on a rock with a tropical background and leaves on the floor. As the video goes, the lights turn off focusing on Ware. The video has over 128 million views, making it her most watched video.

== Winter Olympics ==
Canadian figure skating pairs team Lia Pereira and Trennt Michaud featured "Say You Love Me" as the music for their short program at the 2026 Winter Olympics in Milan. Jessie Ware sent the pair flowers for good luck.

== A cappella covers ==
The song has achieved notable popularity in the collegiate a cappella community, where many groups have independently arranged and covered it:

- Albert Einstein College of Medicine - The Lymph Notes
- Boston College - The Bostonians
- Boston College - The Common Tones (performed as a mash-up with Adele's cover of "Make You Feel My Love")
- Columbia University - Nonsequitur
- Elon University - Twisted Measure
- Emory University - Aural Pleasure
- Georgetown University - Superfood
- Harvard University - The Veritones
- Massachusetts Institute of Technology - Chorallaries
- McGill University - Soulstice
- Northeastern University - Distilled Harmony
- Northeastern University - The Nor'easters
- Ohio State University - The Ohio State of Mind
- Providence College - Anaclastic
- Syracuse University - Main Squeeze
- University of California Berkeley - Artists in Resonance
- University of California Berkeley - California Golden Overtones
- University of Minnesota Twin Cities - 7Days A Cappella
- University of Pennsylvania - The Penny Loafers
- University of Pennsylvania - Quaker Notes
- University of Virginia - The Virginia Gentlemen
- Williams College - Ephoria

== Track listings ==
Digital download
No.	Title	Length
1.	"Say You Love Me"	4:17

Remixes EP
No.	Title	Length
1.	"Say You Love Me" (Shura remix)	4:12
2.	"Say You Love Me" (Gorgon City remix)	5:04
3.	"Say You Love Me" (Alexander Adair remix)	2:58

== Charts ==
Chart (2014–15)	Peak position
Australia (ARIA)	91
Belgium (Ultratip Bubbling Under Flanders)	30
Czech Republic Singles Digital (ČNS IFPI)	85
Ireland (IRMA)	58
Poland (Polish Airplay New)	1
Scotland Singles (OCC)	18
UK Singles (OCC)	22

== Certifications ==
Region	Certification	Certified units/sales
United Kingdom (BPI)	Platinum	600,000^{‡}
^{‡} Sales+streaming figures based on certification alone.

== Release history ==
Region	Date	Format	Label
United Kingdom	18 August 2014	Digital download	Island
