= Night Light (Jessie Ware song) =

Single by Jessie Ware

from the album Devotion
- Released: 25 September 2012
- Recorded: 2011
- Length: 4:13
- Label: Island
- Songwriters: Jessie Ware; Kid Harpoon; Dave Okumu
- Producer: Dave Okumu

Jessie Ware singles chronology
"Wildest Moments" (2012)	"Night Light" (2012)	"Sweet Talk" (2012)

"Night Light" is a song by British singer-songwriter Jessie Ware from her debut studio album, Devotion. The song was released in the United Kingdom as a digital download on 25 September 2012. The song was written by Jessie Ware, Kid Harpoon and Dave Okumu. The song peaked at number 95 on the UK Singles Chart.

== Music video ==
A music video to accompany the release of "Night Light" was first released onto YouTube on 18 September 2012 at a total length of four minutes and thirteen seconds.

== Track listing ==
Album version
No.	Title	Length
1.	"Night Light"	4:13

Digital download
No.	Title	Length
1.	"Night Light" (Joe Goddard Remix)	5:35
2.	"Night Light" (Wild Beasts Remix)	2:47
3.	"Night Light" (Perseus Remix)	3:27

== Credits and personnel ==
- Lead vocals – Jessie Ware
- Producers – Dave Okumu
- Engineers – Dan Vinci
- Lyrics – Jessie Ware, Kid Harpoon, Dave Okumu
- Label – Island

== Chart performance ==
Chart (2012–13)	Peak position
Belgium (Ultratip Bubbling Under Flanders)	7
UK Singles (Official Charts Company)	95

== Release history ==
Region	Date	Format	Label
United Kingdom	25 September 2012	Digital download	Island
