= Tough Love (Jessie Ware song) =

Single by Jessie Ware

from the album Tough Love
- Released: 23 June 2014
- Length: 3:29
- Label: Island
- Songwriters: Jessie Ware; Benjamin Levin; Benjamin Ash
- Producer: BenZel

Jessie Ware singles chronology
"Imagine It Was Us" (2013)	"Tough Love" (2014)	"Say You Love Me" (2014)

"Tough Love" is a song by British singer-songwriter Jessie Ware from her second studio album, Tough Love (2014). It was written by Ware, Benny Blanco, and Benjamin Ash and produced by Blanco and Ash under their production pseudonym BenZel. The song was released in the United Kingdom as a digital download on 23 June 2014 as the lead single from the album. It peaked at number 34 on the UK Singles Chart, becoming Ware's first domestic top 40 entry. Critically acclaimed, "Tough Love" was included on Pitchfork's list of the 100 best songs of 2014.

== Background ==
"Tough Love" was written by Ware, Benny Blanco, and Benjamin Ash and recorded during a two-week touring break in May 2013. Speaking about the track in an interview with NME, Ware commented: "I had just finished a run of shows in the States and went to New York to work with BenZel for a couple weeks, mainly as a different focus to touring. I didn’t have any expectations or pressures with what would come out of those two weeks, and think "Tough Love" sums this up. It was me experimenting with my voice and having fun with it. It just felt right and kind of dictated the route of the next album, much like "Devotion" did on my first album."

Initially recorded an octave lower, one of the producers encouraged Ware to sing the downtempo song in a higher register. "[He] was like 'Go and try the higher up,' Ware told Pitchfork, "and I was like, 'Nah, I can't do it up there,' and he's like, 'Just try it!' And I did. Moving it up to a higher octave definitely gives it this other character." Lyrically, "Tough Love" was inspired by the trails of maintaining a long-term relationship while jumping from continent to continent.

== Music video ==
A music video to accompany the release of "Tough Love" was directed by Alex Lee and Kyle Wightman of BRTHR Films. It was first released onto YouTube on 9 July 2014 at a total length of three minutes and thirty seconds.

== Track listing ==
Digital download
No.	Title	Length
1.	"Tough Love"	3:29

== Charts ==
Chart performance for "Tough Love"
Chart (2014)	Peak position
Belgium (Ultratip Bubbling Under Flanders)	19
Scottish Singles Sales (Official Charts)	37
UK Singles (Official Charts)	34

== Release history ==
"Tough Love" release history
Region	Date	Format(s)	Label(s)	Ref.
Various	23 June 2014	Digital download	Island	
