= Alone (Jessie Ware song) =

Single by Jessie Ware

from the album Glasshouse
- Released: 14 September 2017
- Length: 3:36
- Label: Island
- Songwriters: Sarah Aarons; Thomas Hull; Jessie Ware
- Producers: Kid Harpoon; Stint

Jessie Ware singles chronology
"Selfish Love" (2017)	"Alone" (2017)	"Your Domino" (2017)

Music video
- "Alone" on YouTube

"Alone" is a song by British singer-songwriter Jessie Ware. It was written by Ware, Sarah Aarons and Kid Harpoon, with production handled by Harpoon and Stint. The song was released through Island Records on 14 September 2017, as the third single from the singer-songwriter's third studio album, Glasshouse (2017).

== Background ==
On 13 September 2017, Ware premiered the song on Annie Mac's BBC Radio 1 show, as Mac's "Hottest Record", alongside the official announcement of the album. "I definitely tried to rush this record, and then I got pregnant. I think by me getting pregnant, it actually made me take stock of what I had and actually realise that I could do better," Ware told Mac. Ware said of the song in a press release: "I'm so happy to be reunited with Kid Harpoon on this one. It's a song about stealing time with your loved one, and longing for the simple declaration that they want the same."

== Critical reception ==
William Connolly of Gay Times felt the song "follows the great success of other new tracks Midnight and Selfish Love". Robin Murray of Clash deemed the song "a silken return, with Jessie's wonderfully soulful voice entwined with some of her most personal songwriting yet". Rob Hakimian of The 405 called it a "sultry song" and "choir-imbued power ballad".

== Music video ==
The official music video for the song premiered on 12 October 2017. It was directed by Charlie Robbins and filmed at Eltham Palace in London.

== Track listing ==
Digital download
No.	Title	Length
1.	"Alone"	3:36

Digital download – Acoustic
No.	Title	Length
1.	"Alone" (acoustic)	3:46

== Credits and personnel ==
Credits adapted from Tidal.

- Jessie Ware – songwriting, vocals
- Sarah Aarons – songwriting, background vocals
- Kid Harpoon – songwriting, production, background vocals
- Stint – production, engineering, drums, piano, programming, synthesizer
- Stuart Hawkes – mastering engineering
- Fabiana Palladino – background vocals
- Joy Joseph – background vocals
- Spike Stent – mixing

== Charts ==
Chart (2017)	Peak position
Poland Airplay (ZPAV)	19
Scottish Singles Sales (Official Charts)	29
UK Singles (Official Charts)	60

== Certifications ==
Region	Certification	Certified units/sales
United Kingdom (BPI)	Silver	200,000^{‡}
^{‡} Sales+streaming figures based on certification alone.

== Release history ==
Region	Date	Format	Version	Label	Ref.
Various	14 September 2017	Digital download	Original	Island	
Various	22 September 2017	Digital download	Acoustic	Island	
United Kingdom	6 October 2017	Contemporary hit radio	Original	Island	
