= Champagne Kisses =

- Remix EP artwork

Single by Jessie Ware

from the album Tough Love
- Released: April 20, 2015
- Length: 3:22
- Label: Island
- Songwriters: Jessie Ware; Benny Blanco; Ben Ash
- Producer: BenZel

Jessie Ware singles chronology
"You & I (Forever)" (2015)	"Champagne Kisses" (2015)	"Midnight" (2017)

"Champagne Kisses" is a song by British singer-songwriter Jessie Ware from her second studio album, Tough Love (2014). The song serves as the album's fourth official single, and a digital download containing two official remixes of the song was released in the United Kingdom on 20 April 2015. "Champagne Kisses" was written by Ware, Benny Blanco and Ben Ash, and was produced by BenZel.

== Music video ==
On 17 January 2015, Ware confirmed on her Twitter account that the fourth single to be released from the album would be "Champagne Kisses". Chris Sweeney directed the video, which was published on Ware's YouTube account on 11 February 2015. The video shows surrealistic images that evoke the idea that Ware is patiently waiting for her turn in experiencing the supreme love she sings about in her song. The color palette is strongly composed by primary and secondary colours. There is no digital technology portrayed in the video but only objects from the analogue era. Most of the outfits worn by Ware are inspired by 1980s fashion apart from a black suit that could be from 1990s. Ariana Bacle from Entertainment Weekly wrote that watching the video "is like stepping into a modern art museum: Two-toned pills sit on silver chargers, clones of Ware are bound together by only hair, and bodies succumb to the fun mirror effect—but without any fun mirror in sight."

== Reception ==
Out hailed the music video for its "intense, surreal art direction, each color saturated image is both delightfully whimsical and intrinsically off-putting, thus mirroring the track's love me/leave me, yes/no themes."

The Fader chose "Champagne Kiss" as the standout tracks from Tough Love, praising its music video as "one of her trippier visuals to date" packed with "surreal imagery, from conjoined twins to wooden limbs, pills, and a quicksand-like floor".

== Track listings ==
Digital download
No.	Title	Length
1.	"Champagne Kisses"	3:22

Remixes EP
No.	Title	Length
1.	"Champagne Kisses" (TCTS remix)	4:27
2.	"Champagne Kisses" (Darius remix)	4:58

== Charts ==
Chart (2015)	Peak position
UK Singles (Official Charts Company)	169

== Release history ==
Region	Date	Format	Label
United Kingdom	20 April 2015	Digital download (Remixes EP)	Island
