= Laura Dockrill =

English author and performance poet

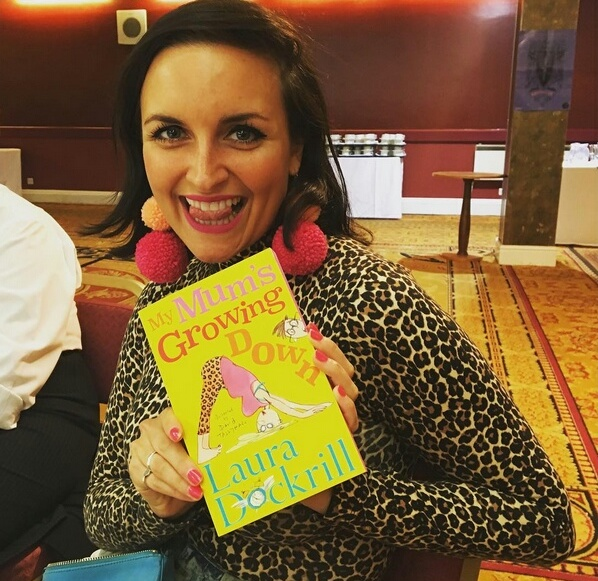
Image of Laura Dockrill holding one of her books

Laura Lee Dockrill (born 28 May 1986) is an English author and performance poet.

== Personal life ==
Dockrill is from Brixton, South London. She attended the BRIT School and Richard Atkins Primary School. She went on to graduate from Middlesex University.

Dockrill is married to musician Hugo White (from The Maccabees); they have a son, after whose birth Dockrill suffered severe postpartum psychosis.

== Books ==
- Mistakes in the Background (HarperCollins, 2008)
- Ugly Shy Girl (HarperCollins, 2009)
- Echoes (HarperCollins, 2010)
- What Have I Done? Motherhood, Mental illness & Me (Square Peg, 2020)
- I Love You, I Love You, I love You (HQ, 2024)

== Children's books ==
- Darcy Burdock (2013)
- Lorali (Hot Key Books, 2015)
- Aurabel (Hot Key Books, 2017)
- My Mum's Growing Down (Faber & Faber, 2017)
- Big Bones (Hot Key Books, 2018)
- Angry Cookie (Walker Books, 2018)
- Robin Hood (Samuel French, 2018)
- My ideal boyfriend is a croissant (2019)
- Sequin and Stitch (Barrington Stoke, 2020)
- Butterfly Brain (Templar Publishing, 2020)
- The Lipstick (Walker Books, 2021)
