= Induce (musician) =

American disc jockey

Ryan Smith, better known by his stage name Induce, is an American, Los Angeles–based DJ, record producer, singer, and writer. He works in a variety of musical genres, particularly hip hop, rap, and soul.

== Biography ==
Ryan was born and grew up in Miami, Florida, United States, and started his career there. In 2013, he relocated to Los Angeles, California, where he currently resides.

== Career ==
In the early 2000s, Induce co-founded Miami-based independent record label, Counterflow Recordings, and brought artists such as Panda One and Plant Life to the label. Induce currently owns and operates his own label, The Wonderful Sound, also known as WonderSound.

He also served as editor-in-chief and contributing writer for issues 1 and 2 of the turntablism magazine, Tablist Magazine, founded by DJ Infamous.

In 2008 he was voted by the Miami New Times as Best Club DJ in Miami, while more recently he has received recognition for his work as a singer: his 2012 album Halfway Between Me And You was praised as one of the best indie-soul releases of that year by MTV Hive, and won him Artist of the Year in the Miami-area hip-hop website The 305. In 2013 he began music video directing, including for "Get Down Saturday Night" (video 2013) from Halfway Between Me And You and "Ride Around" and "Alina" from Sunset Summer.

He currently has a monthly radio show on dublab called Induce's Listening, showcasing his wide range of musical inspiration.

=== Collaborations ===
Induce has collaborated on a DJ mix with Danny Daze consisting Italo disco style music, Disco For Abruzzo Vol. 1, and has toured with Kid Sister as her DJ.

Other collaborations include Casual Sax & The Saxual Revolution with Sven Barth, a joke rap group whose "Baby I'm Black (But only from the waist down)", parodying "Baby Come Back", was featured by Perez Hilton, and Antennae, a leftfield hip hop group with longtime collaborator Manuvers [sic] and Miami based rapper Stres.

Induce has worked with a number of prominent producers and DJs, notably Gigamesh, being featured on the song "When You’re Dancing" (2011); DJ Kon, being featured on the song "Love Shine" on the On My Way; and Jack Splash.

== Discography ==
(See references.)

=== Albums ===
- Induce – Cuticle Scrapes Vol. 1 (2001) (Counterflow Recordings)
- Induce – Cycle (2005) (WonderSound)
- Antennae – Exit (2005) (Botanica Del Jibaro)
- Induce – Cuticle Scrapes Vol. 2 (2007) (Jew Jitsu Records)
- Casual Sax & The Saxual Revolution – The Blow Sven Theory (2009) (WonderSound)
- The Wonderful Sound Of Induce! – Halfway Between Me And You (2012) (WonderSound)

=== EPs and singles ===
- Induce ft. Skam2 & Dejah – Retribution/Reciprocation Pt. 1 (Untitled 12″) (2003)(Counterflow Recordings)
- Induce – Color Clouds Blue 10″ (2005) (WonderSound)
- Induce – Cycle 12″ EP (2005) (WonderSound)
- Induce – Pretty b/w get Down Saturday Night 12″ (2011) (WonderSound)
- Induce – Sunset Summer EP (2013) (WonderSound/Wax Poetics)

=== Remixes ===
- Five Deez – Faceless (Induce Remix) (2001) (Counterflow Recordings)
- Mr. Cooper – Five (Induce Remix) (2006) (Project Mooncircle)
- Plantlife – Lovetoy (Induce Remix) (2008) (Decon)

=== Additional productions ===
- Seven Star – Intro For Jon – My Mother And Father Were Astronauts (2004) (Counterflow Recordings)
- Seven Star – Irate MC (Remix) – My Mother And Father Were Astronauts (2004) (Counterflow Recordings)
- Seven Star – Gender Affection – My Mother And Father Were Astronauts (2004) (Counterflow Recordings)
- Serum & Induce – Afterburner – The Vapors Project (2002) (Counterflow Recordings)
- Induce – Tracks – The Vapors Project (2002) (Counterflow Recordings)
- Induce ft. Seven Star – F1X7UR3 – Calderas Of Mind Compilation (2006) (Project Mooncircle)

=== Features ===
- Joint Chiefs – What I Wanna Say b/w Plan To Struggle 12” (1999) [Scratches]
- Cyne – Due Progress (Evolver Remix) 12” (2003) (Botanica Del Jibaro) [Scratches]
- Induce Ft. Seven Star – Club Anger – Infiltrate 6.0 (2004) (Rice And Beans) [Production, Vocals]
- Supersoul – Think It Through (2004) (Metatronix) [Scratches]
- Seven Star – For Her – (2005) (Counterflow Recordings) [Synth, Vocals]
- V/A – Ghibli Of Life Compilation (2010) (Infas Music) [Vocals]
- Danny Daze & Zarate – For This Love Ft. Induce (2011) (Nervous Records) [Vocals]
- Danny Daze & Clockwerk – L.O.Y.L. Ft. Induce (2011) [Vocals]
- Gigamesh – When You're Dancing ft. Induce – Single (2011) (OurLabel Intl) [Vocals]
- Sepalot – Change Ft. Fashawn & Induce (2011) (Eskapaden Records) [Vocals]
- James Curd – Guide Me (Gigamesh Remix) (2012) [Vocals]
- Kon – Love Shine ft. Induce (2012) (BBE) [Vocals]
- Ruckus Roboticus - Be All Right ft. Induce (2014) (Dance Or Die Records) [Vocals]
