= Running (Jessie Ware song) =

Single by Jessie Ware

from the album Devotion
- Released: 24 February 2012
- Genre: Sophisti-pop
- Length: 4:29
- Label: PMR; Island
- Songwriters: Jessie Ware; Julio Bashmore; Brey Baptista
- Producers: Dave Okumu; Julio Bashmore

Jessie Ware singles chronology
"Strangest Feeling" (2011)	"Running" (2012)	"110%" (2012)

"Running" is a song and debut single by British singer-songwriter Jessie Ware from her debut studio album, Devotion (2012). The song was released in the United Kingdom as a digital download on 24 February 2012. The drum loop used in the chorus of the song was based on Prince's "The Ballad of Dorothy Parker". The single features a particularly popular remix of the song by Disclosure, which was later featured as a bonus track in the deluxe edition of their debut studio album, Settle (2013). The remix was featured in the Xbox 360 and Xbox One racing game Forza Horizon 2 (2014).

== Music video ==
A music video to accompany the release of "Running" was first released on YouTube on 13 February 2012 at a total length of four minutes and thirty-five seconds. The video was directed by Kate Moross.

== Track listing ==
Digital download
No.	Title	Producer(s)	Length
1.	"Running"	Dave Okumu	4:29
2.	"Running" (Disclosure remix)	Okumu; Disclosure^{[a]}	5:17

Notes

- ^{^[a]} signifies an additional producer

== Chart performance ==
Chart performance for "Running"
Chart (2012)	Peak position
Belgium (Ultratip Bubbling Under Flanders)	17
Netherlands (Single Top 100)	99
UK Singles (Official Charts Company)	165

== Certifications ==
Certifications for "Running"
Region	Certification	Certified units/sales
United Kingdom (BPI)	Silver	200,000^{‡}
^{‡} Sales+streaming figures based on certification alone.

== Release history ==
"Running" release history
Region	Date	Format(s)	Label(s)	Ref.
United Kingdom	24 February 2012	Digital download	PMR; Island	
