= Wildest Moments =

Single by Jessie Ware

from the album Devotion
- Released: 29 June 2012
- Length: 3:42
- Label: Island
- Songwriters: Jessie Ware; Kid Harpoon
- Producers: Kid Harpoon; Dave Okumu

Jessie Ware singles chronology
"110%" (2012)	"Wildest Moments" (2012)	"Night Light" (2012)

"Wildest Moments" is a song by British singer-songwriter Jessie Ware from her debut studio album, Devotion (2012). It was written by Ware and Kid Harpoon, while production was helmed by the latter and Dave Okumu. "Wildest Moments "was released in the United Kingdom as a digital download on 29 June 2012 to positive responses and high acclaim.

== Critical reception ==
The song received highly positive reviews. Pitchfork Media gave the song its "Best New Music" accolade. It also featured in their Top 100 Tracks of 2012 at number 21.

== Music video ==
A music video to accompany the release of "Wildest Moments" was first released on YouTube on 2 July 2012 at a total length of four minutes and five seconds. The video consists of a single shot of Ware sitting while singing the song, with the camera slowly rotating around her.

== Track listing ==
Digital download
No.	Title	Length
1.	"Wildest Moments"	3:42

== Chart performance ==
=== Weekly charts ===
Weekly chart performance for "Wildest Moments"
Chart (2012–14)	Peak position
Belgium (Ultratop 50 Flanders)	3
Belgium (Ultratop 50 Wallonia)	26
Greece Digital Songs (Billboard)	3
Poland (Polish Airplay New)	4
Romania Airplay (Media Forest)	9
UK Singles (Official Charts Company)	46

=== Year-end charts ===
Year-end chart performance for "Wildest Moments"
Chart (2012)	Peak position
Belgium (Ultratop Flanders)	38

== Certifications ==
Certifications for Wildest Moments
Region	Certification	Certified units/sales
Belgium (BRMA)	Gold	15,000^{*}
United Kingdom (BPI)	Silver	200,000^{‡}
^{*} Sales figures based on certification alone.^{‡} Sales+streaming figures based on certification alone.

== Release history ==
"Wildest Moments" release history
Region	Date	Format(s)	Label(s)	Ref.
United Kingdom	29 June 2012	Digital download	Island	

== Use in other media ==
- "Wildest Moments" features on the second-season episode — "Re-Launch" (2012) — of New Girl, playing in the background as characters Schmidt and Cece talk at the end of the episode.
- "Wildest Moments" also features on the third-season episode — "Who I Want to Be" (2013) — of Awkward, playing in the background as characters Jenna and Matty dance together at the prom.
- "Wildest Moments" features on the show Lovesick, season 1, episode 2
