= Two Inch Punch =

English musician and producer

Ben Ash
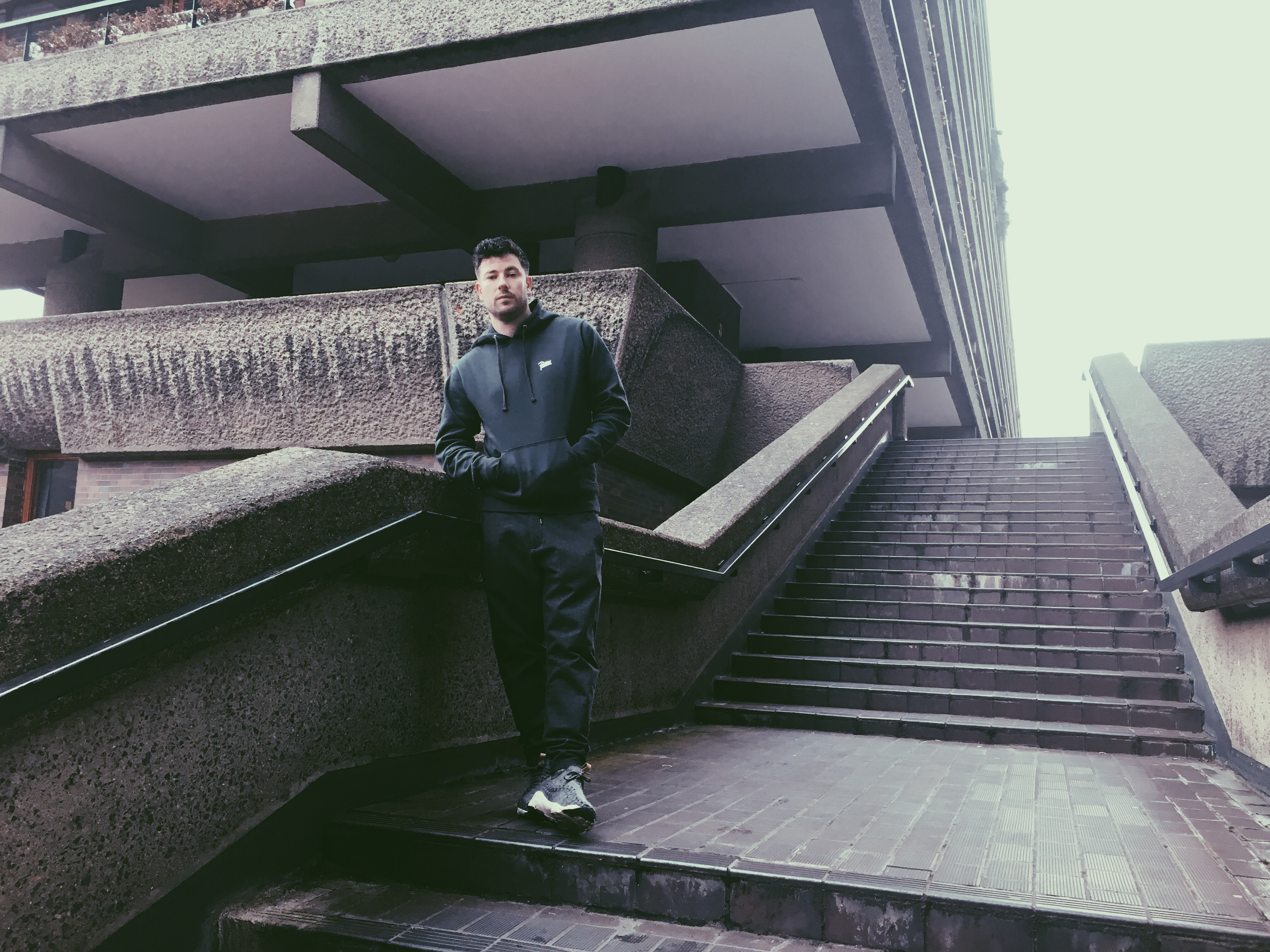

Background information
- Origin: Brentford, London, England
- Genres: Pop; R&B; hip hop; pop rock; electronic; dance-pop; synth-pop
- Occupations: Record producer; musician; remixer; songwriter

Ben Ash, professionally known as Two Inch Punch, is an English record producer, musician, remixer and songwriter. He has written and produced records with Jessie Ware, Sam Smith, Years & Years, Rag'n'Bone Man, Tory Lanez, Ty Dolla $ign, Damon Albarn, and Brian Eno.

Ash also collaborates with American producer Benny Blanco as the production outfit BenZel. They have featured with Sia, Wiz Khalifa, Juicy J, Cashmere Cat and Ryn Weaver.

== Career ==
In 2012 Ash put out his first record "Love You Up" online under the alias Two Inch Punch. It was quickly downloaded and played by Diplo, DJ Oneman, Zane Lowe, Rinse FM DJs and other tastemakers, all via word of mouth. Nick Grimshaw made it his record of the week on BBC Radio 1, while the B-Side "Luv Luv" was being championed by MistaJam. In 2012, the white label became big on the underground, selling out 200 records on the first day.

Ash then signed to PMR Records / Island Records and released his debut EP The Love You Up EP and The Slow Jams EP before going on to write for artists and building his sound and name as a producer / songwriter.

In 2015, Ash was nominated for two awards at the 57th Grammy Awards (Album of the Year and Best Pop Vocal Album) for his writing and producing contributions to Sam Smith's debut album In The Lonely Hour, winning the award for Best Pop Vocal Album. Following the success of his work with Sam Smith, Ash would then go on to have a production role on Rag'n'Bone Man's debut album Human.

== Discography ==
Year	Title	Artist	Album/EP	Songwriter	Producer
2012	Love You Up	Two Inch Punch	Love You Up EP	check	check
2012	MoonStruck	Two Inch Punch	Saturn Slow Jams EP	check	check
2012	Paint It Red (featuring Mikky Ekko)	Two Inch Punch	Saturn Slow Jams EP	check	check
2013	Safe With Me	Sam Smith	Nirvana EP	check	check
2013	Lost in Empathy	Rejjie Snow	N/A	check	check
2013	Precious	Javeon	N/A	check	check
2013	Deeper	Ella Eyre	Deeper EP	check	check
2013	Love Me Like You	Ella Eyre	Deeper Single	check	check
2013	If You Love Me	BenZel featuring Jessie Ware	If You Love Me	check	check
2013	Season Change	Damon Albarn and Ghostpoet	Africa Express Presents: Maison De Jeune	check	check
2014	Caution to the Wind	Becky Hill	Caution to the Wind	check	check
2014	Money on My Mind	Sam Smith	In the Lonely Hour	check	check
2014	Life Support	Sam Smith	In the Lonely Hour	check	check
2014	Desire	Years & Years	Communion		check
2014	Eyes Shut	Years & Years	Communion		check
2014	The Fall	Indiana	No Romeo	check	check
2014	Tough Love	Jessie Ware	Tough Love	check	check
2014	Champagne Kisses	Jessie Ware	Tough Love	check	check
2014	Say You Love Me	Jessie Ware	Tough Love	check	check
2014	Kind Of...Sometimes...Maybe	Jessie Ware	Tough Love	check	check
2014	You and I Forever	Jessie Ware	Tough Love	check	check
2014	Wasted Love (featuring Stevie Neale)	BenZel	MEN EP	check	check
2014	Four (featuring Juicy J & Cashmere Cat)	BenZel	MEN EP	check	check
2015	Sitting Pretty featuring Wiz Khalifa	Ty Dolla $ign	Free TC	check	check
2015	Gemini	Anne-Marie	Karate EP	check	check
2015	Boy	Anne-Marie	TBA	check	check
2016	Human	Rag'n'Bone Man	Human		check
2016	Ego	Rag'n'Bone Man	Human	check	check
2016	Innocent Man	Rag'n'Bone Man	Human	check	check
2016	Evil	James Vincent McMorrow	We Move	check	check
2016	Killer Whales	James Vincent McMorrow	We Move	check	check
2016	To D.R.E.A.M	Tory Lanez	I Told You	check	check
2016	Guns & Roses	Tory Lanez	I Told You	check	check
2016	All Night	SG Lewis		check	check
2016	Nothings Gonna Change	Jamie Lidell	Building A Beginning	check	check
2017	Best Friend	Rex Orange County	Single	check	check
2017	Uno	Rex Orange County	Single	check	check
2017	Falcon Eye	Off Bloom			check
2017	Good Friend	JP Cooper	Raised Under Grey Skies	check	check
2017	Black & Blue	Elijah Blake	Single	check	check
2017	Sunflower	Rex Orange County	Single	check	check
2017	Cold Fire	Saya	Single	check	check
2017	Brother	Kodaline	Single	check	
2017	Werk It Out	Tiggs Da Author	Single	check	check
2017	Two Fingers	Dan Caplen	Single	check	check
2017	Fuck Feelings	Olivia O’Brien	It's Not That Deep EP	check	check
2017	Never Enough	Rex Orange County	Apricot Princess		check
2018	Dead To Me	Kali Uchis	Isolation	check	check
2018	Palo Santo	Years & Years	Palo Santo		check
2018	Lucky Escape	Years & Years	Palo Santo		check
2018	Best Dressed Man	Aeris Roves	Single (Moon By Island Gardens)	check	check
2018	Feel Me	Aeris Roves	Single (Moon By Island Gardens)	check	check
2018	Delilah	Aeris Roves	Single (Moon By Island Gardens)	check	check
2018	Comfortable	Aeris Roves	Moon By Island Gardens	check	check
2018	Pressure When The Sun Comes Down	Aeris Roves	Moon By Island Gardens	check	check
2018	Running Thru 3am	Aeris Roves	Moon By Island Gardens	check	check
2018	No Guarantee	Aeris Roves	Moon By Island Gardens	check	check
2018	The Hoodie Song	Mae Muller	Single	check	check
2018	Jenny	Mae Muller	Single	check	check
2018	Busy Tone	Mae Muller	Single	check	check
2018	Break My Heart	Benny Blanco	Friends Keep Secrets	check	check
2018	You to You	Maisie Peters	Dressed Too Nice For A Jacket	check	check
2019	CRYBABY :*(	Dijon	Single	check	check
2019	Ugly	Ella Henderson	Single	check	check
2019	DNA	Years & Years	Single		check
2019	100 Thoughts	SL	Single	check	check
2019	Gigantalous	SL	Single	check	check
2019	Never had the balls	Rex Orange County	Single	check	
2019	3rd Jan	Lola Young	Intro		check
2019	Blind Love	Lola Young	Intro	check	check
2019	Holy Water	Freya Ridings	TBA	check	check
2019	April Showers	Maisie Peters	It's Your Bed Babe, It's Your Funeral	check	check
2019	Céline	Gallant	Sweet Insomnia	check	
2020	Smile	Maisie Peters	Birds of Prey (soundtrack)	check	check
2020	Super Hi	SL	Different Dude	check	check
2020	Dance (’Til You Love Someone Else)	Sam Smith	Love Goes	check	check
2020	Rest Of My Life	JC Stewart	When The Light Hits The Room EP		check
2020	Go Fast Baby	Raissa	Single	check	check
2020	Less Is More	Loryn	Less Is More EP	check	check
2020	Téléphone	Chily	Single	check	check
2021	Whatchumacallit	Col3trane	Single	check	check
2021	Bad	Pa Salieu	Single	check	check
2021	Smoke Hole	Sad Night Dynamite	Sad Night Dynamite		check
2021	Lost In LA	A Month Of Sundays, James Vincent McMorrow, Jessie Ware	Single	check	check
2021	Nginothando Lwakhe	A Month Of Sundays, The Joy	Single	check	check
2021	Can’t Sleep	A Month Of Sundays, Wesley Joseph	Single	check	check
2021	Brasil	A Month Of Sundays, MICHELLE	Single	check	check
2021	Tru Love	James Vincent McMorrow	Grapefruit Season		check
2021	Long Way Down	Aeris Roves	Single	check	check
2021	Cairo	Aeris Roves	Single	check	check
2021	Isencane Lengane	The Joy	Singles		check
2021	You Complete Me (Intro)	The Joy	Singles		check
2021	Umacashelana	The Joy	Singles		check
2021	Jele Iguana	The Joy	Singles		check
2021	Amabutho	The Joy	Singles		check
2021	Baba Kulungile	The Joy	Singles		check
2021	Mortal Kombat	V9	Murk With A Mouth		check
2021	What A Life	Gabe Coulter	I Heard A Whisper EP		check
2021	I Heard A Whisper	Gabe Coulter	I Heard A Whisper EP		check
2021	Thinking Fucks You Up	Gabe Coulter	I Heard A Whisper EP		check
2021	You	Gabe Coulter	I Heard A Whisper EP		check
2022	Demon	Sad Night Dynamite & Moonchild Sanelly	Volume II	check	check
2022	Black & White	Sad Night Dynamite	Volume II	check	check
2022	Tramp	Sad Night Dynamite	Volume II	check	check
2022	Favourite	Artemas	I’m Sorry I’m Like This	check	check
2022	Real Life	Artemas	I’m Sorry I’m Like This	check	check
2022	Waiting For It All To Go Wrong	Artemas	I’m Sorry I’m Like This	check	check
2022	Who’s That Girl	Artemas	I’m Sorry I’m Like This	check	check
2022	I’m Sorry	Artemas	I’m Sorry I’m Like This		check
2022	Mr Snowman	Artemas	I’m Sorry I’m Like This	check	check
2022	I’m Tryna Tell U That I Love U	Artemas	I’m Sorry I’m Like This	check	check
2022	Love Yourself Again	Artemas	I’m Sorry I’m Like This	check	check
2022	What A Time To Be Alive	Artemas	I’m Sorry I’m Like This	check	check
2022	Runaway	Artemas	I’m Sorry I’m Like This	check	check
2022	Happiness Street	Artemas	I’m Sorry I’m Like This	check	check
2022	Hello Again	Artemas	Single	check	check
2022	Trash - demo	Artemas	Single		check
2022	No Biggie	ArrDee	Pier Pressure	check	check
2022	Pulling Me Closer	Aeris Roves	Single	check	check
2023	Roll With A G	Clavish	Rap Game Awful	check	check
2023	You Don’t Call Me Anymore	Sam Fischer	Single	check	check

Bold type denotes singles.

=== Remixes & edits ===
Title	Original artist
"The Look" (TIPs Shook Shook Refix)	Metronomy
"German Whip" (Remix)	Meridian Dan
"Spoons" (Remix)	Rudimental
"People Help the People" (Remix)	Birdy
"Nirvana" (Promised Land Remix)	Sam Smith
"Suit & Tie" (Let Me Love Remix)	Justin Timberlake
