= Dornik =

British musician

- Born: 2 January 1990 (age 35)
- Origin: Croydon, London, England
- Genres: R&B
- Occupation(s): Singer, musician
- Years active: 2012–present
- Labels: Island, Universal
- Website: http://www.dornikmusic.com

Dornik Leigh (born 2 January 1990 in Croydon, London, England) is a British musician.

== Career ==
Dornik started off being a ghostwriter for Odd Future and Syd Tha Kyd. He later was credited as producer and songwriter in those groups. In addition to that, he also collaborated with several other artists as well, in addition to being a prominent backing musician, performing with Jessie Ware. Notably being the male vocalist for the song, "Valentine." Due to the collaboration efforts with Ware, she was able to get him signed with Island Records, from where he released his self titled debut album, Dornik, in 2015. His follow up album, Limboland, was released in May 2020.

== Discography ==
=== Albums ===
- Dornik (2015)
- Limboland (2020)
