= Julio Bashmore =

English house music producer and DJ

- Birth name: Mathew Stephen Walker
- Also known as: Julio Bashmore
- Origin: Bristol, England
- Genres: House
- Occupation(s): Producer, DJ
- Years active: 2009–present
- Labels: Dirtybird Records, Ten Thousand Yen, Soul Motive, PMR Records, 3024, Futureboogie Recordings, Broadwalk Records, Local Action

Mathew Stephen Walker, better known by the stage name Julio Bashmore, is an English house music producer and DJ.

== Discography ==
=== Albums ===
- 2015: "Knockin' Boots" (Broadwalk Records)

=== Singles and EPs ===
- 2009: Julio Bashmore EP (Dirtybird Records)
- 2010: "Chazm / Footsteppin'" (Ten Thousand Yen)
- 2010: "Batak Groove" (Soul Motive)
- 2011: "Everyone Needs a Theme Tune" (PMR Records)
- 2011: "Batty Knee Dance" (3024)
- 2011: "Riff Wrath" (Futureboogie Recordings)
- 2011: "Father Father" feat. Javeon McCarthy (Futureboogie Recordings)
- 2012: "Au Seve" (Broadwalk Records)
- 2012: "Husk" (Broadwalk Records)
- 2013: "Mirror Song" (Broadwalk Records)
- 2014: "Peppermint" feat. Jessie Ware (Broadwalk Records)
- 2014: "Simple Love" (Broadwalk Records)
- 2015: "Rhythm of Auld" (Broadwalk Records)
- 2015: "Rhythm of Auld" (Broadwalk Records)
- 2023: "Bubblin" (Local Action)
