= List of awards and nominations received by Jessie Ware =

Jessie Ware awards and nominations
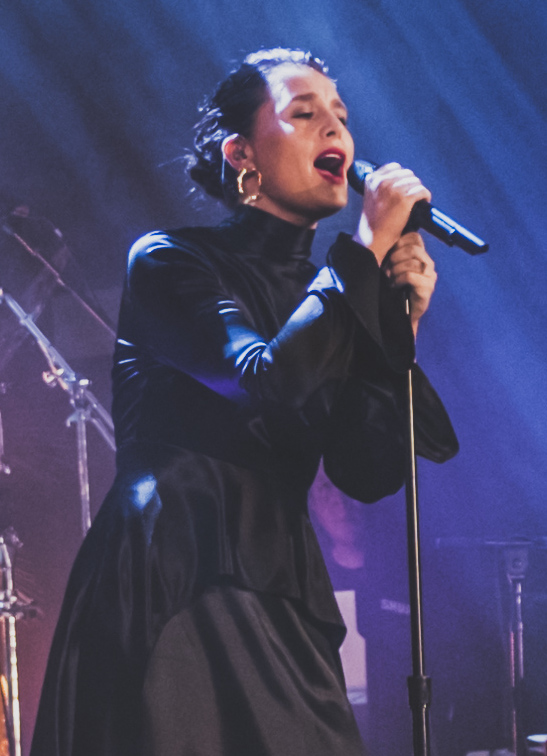
- Ware performing at the Islington Assembly Hall in 2017
Awards and nominations
Award	Wins	Nominations
Brit Awards	0	7
British Podcast Awards	0	3
Mercury Prize	0	2
MOBO Awards	0	5
MTV Europe Music Awards	0	1
Popjustice £20 Music Prize	0	2
UK Music Video Awards	0	5
Various awards and nominations	5	12

Totals (Note: Certain award groups do not simply award one winner. They acknowledge several different recipients, have runners-up, and have third place. Since this is a specific recognition and is different from losing an award, runner-up mentions are considered wins in this award tally. For simplification and to avoid errors, each award in this list has been presumed to have had a prior nomination.)
- Wins: 5
- Nominations: 37

Jessie Ware is a British singer and songwriter who has received various recognitions including seven Brit Awards nominations, two Mercury Prize nomination and a MTV Europe Music Award nomination. She released her debut album Devotion in 2012. The album peaked at number five on the UK Albums Chart and was met with positive reviews from critics and received a nomination for the Mercury Prize. At the 2013 Brit Awards, Ware received two nominations, for British Breakthrough Artist and for British Female Solo Artist. She also received the award for Best Newcomer at the Silver Clef Awards and a nomination for the same category at the MOBO Awards.

Her second album, Tough Love was released in 2014. The title track "Tough Love" was released as album's first single and received nominations for Best Pop Video - UK at the 2014 UK Music Video Awards and the Popjustice £20 Music Prize for Best British Pop Single. In 2015, she received a second nomination for the Brit Award for British Female Solo Artist and was nominated for the MTV Europe Music Award for Best World Stage Performance at the 2015 MTV Europe Music Awards for her live performance at MTV Crashes Cork.

In 2017, she released her third album Glasshouse and received her third Brit Award nomination for British Female Solo Artist at the 2018 Brit Awards. In the same year she started the podcast Table Manners alongside her mother; the project has received nominations for Best Podcast at the Audio and Radio Industry Awards and Best Entertainment Podcast at the British Podcast Awards.

Her fourth album What's Your Pleasure? was released in 2020 to critical acclaim; at the 2021 Brit Awards, the album was nominated for British Album of the Year while Ware received a fourth nomination for British Female Solo Artist. In 2023, she released That! Feels Good!, her fifth album. The album was nominated for the Mercury Prize, her second nomination for the award.

== Brit Awards ==
The Brit Awards are presented by the British Phonographic Industry to honour excellence in music both from the United Kingdom and the world, Jessie Ware received no awards for seven nominations.

Year	Category	Nominated work	Result	Ref.
2013	British Breakthrough Act	Herself	Nominated	
2013	British Female Solo Artist	Herself	Nominated	
2015	British Female Solo Artist	Herself	Nominated	
2018	British Female Solo Artist	Herself	Nominated	
2021	British Female Solo Artist	Herself	Nominated	
2021	British Album of the Year	What's Your Pleasure?	Nominated	
2024	British Artist of the Year	Herself	Nominated	

== British Podcast Awards ==
The British Podcast Awards recognise the best in podcasts from Great Britain.

Year	Category	Nominated work	Result	Ref.
2020	The Spotlight Award	Table Manners	Nominated	
2021	Best Branded Podcast	Table Manners	Nominated	
2021	Best Entertainment Podcast	Table Manners	Nominated	

== Mercury Prize ==
The Mercury Prize is presented annually to the best album of the year by a British or Irish artist, Jessie Ware failed to win two when she was nominated.

Year	Category	Nominated work	Result	Ref.
2012	Album of the Year	Devotion	Nominated	
2023	Album of the Year	That! Feels Good!	Nominated	

== MOBO Awards ==
The MOBO Awards or Music of Black Origin Awards are presented by the MOBO Organisation to recognise the excellence in music of black origin.

Year	Category	Nominated work	Result	Ref.
2012	Best Newcomer	Herself	Nominated	
2012	Best Female Act	Herself	Nominated	
2013	Best Female Act	Herself	Nominated	
2013	Best R&B/Soul Act	Herself	Nominated	
2017	Best Female Act	Herself	Nominated	

== MTV Europe Music Awards ==
The MTV Europe Music Awards are presented annually by the ViacomCBS International Media Networks Europe to honour the best in pop culture.

Year	Category	Nominated work	Result	Ref.
2015	Best World Stage Performance	Live at MTV Crashes Cork	Nominated	

== Popjustice £20 Music Prize ==
The Popjustice £20 Music Prize is presented by the music website Popjustice to recognise the best British pop single of the previous year.

Year	Category	Nominated work	Result	Ref.
2014	Best British Pop Single	"Tough Love"	Nominated	
2020	Best British Pop Single	"Save a Kiss"	Nominated	
2021	Best British Pop Single	"What's Your Pleasure?"	Nominated	
2023	Best British Pop Single	"Free Yourself"	Nominated	

== UK Music Video Awards ==
The UK Music Video Awards is an annual celebration of creativity, technical excellence and innovation in music video and moving image for music from United Kingdom and the world.

Year	Category	Nominated work	Result	Ref.
2014	Best Pop Video - UK	"Tough Love"	Nominated	
2017	Best Pop Video - UK	"Selfish Love"	Nominated	
2020	Best Choreography in a Video	"Step Into My Life"	Nominated	
2022	Best Pop Video - UK	"Kiss of Life" (with Kylie Minogue)	Nominated	
2022	Best Wardrobe Styling in a Video	"Kiss of Life" (with Kylie Minogue)	Nominated	

== Various awards and nominations ==
Year	Award	Category	Nominated work	Result	Ref.
2012	UK Festival Awards	Best Breakthrough Act	Herself	Nominated	
2012	UK Festival Awards	Anthem of the Summer	"Wildest Moments"	Nominated	
2013	South Bank Sky Arts Awards	Pop Music	Devotion	Won	
2013	Silver Clef Awards	Best Newcomer	Herself	Won	
2018	Audio and Radio Industry Awards	Best New Presenter	Table Manners	Nominated	
2018	Audio and Radio Industry Awards	Best Podcast	Table Manners	Nominated	
2018	UK's Audio Production Awards	New Voice Award	Table Manners	Won	
2019	Webby Awards	Best Series - Podcasts	Table Manners	Nominated	
2020	Rober Awards Music Prize	Best Female Artist	Herself	Nominated	
2020	Rober Awards Music Prize	Best Pop Artist	Herself	Nominated	
2021	Sweden GAFFA Awards	Best International Solo Act	Herself	Nominated	
2021	Denmark GAFFA Awards	Best International Solo Act	Herself	Nominated	
2021	Denmark GAFFA Awards	Best International Album	What's Your Pleasure?	Nominated	
2022	NME Awards	Best Podcast	Table Manners	Won	
2022	RTHK International Pop Poll Awards	Top Ten International Gold Songs	"Kiss of Life"	Nominated	
2022	RTHK International Pop Poll Awards	Top Female Artist	Herself	Nominated	
2023	British LGBT Awards	Music Artist	Herself	Nominated	
2023	Rolling Stone UK Awards	Artist Award	Herself	Won	
2024	Silver Clef Awards	Best Female	Herself	Won	
2025	British LGBT Awards	Celebrity Ally	Herself	Nominated	
