= Superbloom (Jessie Ware album) =

Studio album by Jessie Ware
- Released: 17 April 2026
- Length: 42:42
- Label: EMI
- Producers: James Ford; Karma Kid; Barney Lister; Stuart Price; Jon Shave; TommyD

Jessie Ware chronology
That! Feels Good! (2023)	Superbloom (2026)

Singles from Superbloom
- 1. "I Could Get Used to This" Released: 23 January 2026; 2. "Ride" Released: 20 February 2026; 3. "Automatic" Released: 27 March 2026; 4. "Sauna" Released: 17 July 2026

Superbloom is the sixth studio album by the English singer Jessie Ware. It was released on 17 April 2026 through EMI Records. The album was preceded by the singles "I Could Get Used to This", "Ride", and "Automatic". She promoted the album through various talk show appearances, and will embark on the Superbloom Tour, commencing in October 2026.

== Background and recording ==
Following the release of That! Feels Good! (2023), Ware further expanded her profile as a dance-pop and disco artist, receiving critical acclaim for her work and performances. On 29 January 2026, Superbloom was announced as her next studio album, marking her first full-length release since 2023. The album was said to continue in the "disco-inflected footsteps" of her previous studio albums. Continuing the approach she adopted with What's Your Pleasure? (2020), Ware remained in creative control as A&R of the record. She enlisted James Ford, Barney Lister, Karma Kid, Jon Shave, and Stuart Price as producers, with mixing handled by Ben Baptie.

Discussing the album, Ware explained that since What's Your Pleasure? she had been experimenting with "this fantasy world and escapism", describing herself as an artist who is not a "by-the-book 'pop star'" but still enjoys playing "dress-up, glamour, and fun". However, on Superbloom she intended to "dig deeper", aiming to "connect with real relationships and appreciate the love I have". A press release described the album as an "increasingly euphoric body of work" that explores "our shared craving for touch, pleasure, intimacy and connection".

== Promotion ==
=== Singles ===
"I Could Get Used to This" was released as the lead single on 23 January 2026 and was said to pick up where That! Feels Good! had left off in 2023. The track was described as "lush disco-R&B, funky and drenched in strings", produced and co-written by Miranda Cooper and Jon Shave of Xenomania, alongside Sophia Brenan. It features Ware's first key change in a song. According to Ware, the track serves as the "invitation into the world of this album", reflecting its central themes of "romance, real love, performance, celebration and pleasure (always!) in a garden full of gods and goddesses".

The album's second single, "Ride", was released on 20 February of the same year. The song begins with a synth interpolation of the titular theme from the spaghetti Western film The Good, the Bad and the Ugly (1966). Ware described it as the most "dancey" song on the album and "a song for the clubs, for the dancefloor – fun, cinematic, cheeky and powerful". It was the first song written for the album; Ware produced it with Jack Peñate and Karma Kid in 2024. The estate of Ennio Morricone, who composed the score to The Good, the Bad and the Ugly, endorsed Ware's interpolation, which she described as "a really good seal of approval". The song's black and white music video, directed by Thomas James, features actor James Norton as Ware's cowboy love interest in a stylised Western setting. Ware stated that she invited Norton to appear in the video after running into him at a concert of mutual friend Jack Peñate. Commentators noted that the provocative elements of the visual, including a scene in which Ware places her finger in Norton's mouth, were reminiscent of the Fifty Shades film series.

"Automatic" was released as the album's third single on 27 March. The song features a spoken-word introduction by American actor Colman Domingo. Of the song and Domingo's role in it, Ware said: "It’s a celebration of romance and connection. I was actually the voice at the beginning at first, but I wanted someone sexier and smoother and I knew Colman Domingo was the man for the job! He comes in as this 'voice of the love gods'." A fourth single, "Sauna", was released on 17 July 2026. The song's release was accompanied by an extended version and a new remix by Horse Meat Disco, a London-based DJ collective.

=== Tour ===
Prior to the album's release, Ware hosted a series of launch shows entitled 'An Evening with Jessie Ware' in venues across the United Kingdom. The shows consisted of an acoustic set previewing material from Superbloom, interspersed with Ware answering fan questions.

Ware announced the Superbloom Tour on 15 April 2026, her first arena tour, with dates in North America and Europe. British singers Dhruv and Naomi Scott will serve as Ware's opening acts. The tour is set commence on 6 October 2026 in Toronto at History, and is scheduled to conclude on 5 December 2026 in Manchester at Co-op Live.

=== Live performances and interviews ===
On 30 January 2026, Ware performed "I Could Get Used to This" live on The Graham Norton Show. On 18 March, she appeared on Late Night with Seth Meyers to promote the album, and on 23 March she appeared on Watch What Happens Live with Andy Cohen.

== Critical reception ==
Professional ratings
Aggregate scores
Source	Rating
AnyDecentMusic?	7.4/10
Metacritic	76/100
Review scores
Source	Rating
DIY	5/5 stars
The Arts Desk	3/5 stars
Associated Press	2.5/5 stars
The Guardian	3/5 stars
The Independent	4/5 stars
Hot Press	8/10
Our Culture Mag	4/5 stars
musicOMH	4.5/5 stars
Paste	C+
Under the Radar	8/10

Upon release, Superbloom received generally favourable reviews from music critics. AnyDecentMusic? gave the album a score of 7.4 out of 10 based on fourteen reviews.

DIY described Superbloom as a "luscious environ in which to get lost". In his review for musicOMH, John Murphy likened the album's sound to that of New York City's Studio 54 in the 1970s. He further classified the album as a confident, "first-class" continuation of its predecessors—2020's What's Your Pleasure and 2023's That! Feels Good!. Konstantinos Pappis for Our Culture Mag wrote that the album found Ware in her lane, and that it closed a "chapter as much as it opens up new lanes". In her review for Shatter the Standards, Charlotte Rochel gave the album a four-out-of-five star rating and described the album's material as "immaculate". Slant Magazine's Michael Savio felt that Superbloom displayed more strength than its predecessors and complimented Ware for showcasing more "artistic confidence". Clash described Superbloom as a "total, triumphant flowering" for Ware. They further noted her mastering of what they described as "grown-up pop" by using her own wisdom rather the relying on nostalgia. Cult Following gave the album a four-star review, describing it as a confident effort, but noted it showcased more restraint as a follow-up to That! Feels Good!.

The Independent's Helen Brown praised Ware on both her confidence and vocal performance on Superbloom. Caroline Kelly of Hot Press described Superbloom as an inward-turning, radiantly mature progression for Ware and recognised her for the "raw exploration of selfhood" the album showcased. Joshua Miller, an author for RIFF, felt Ware found her "groove" with the album. He further noted the album had components of What's Your Pleasure and That! Feels Good!, "letting them grow freely". Jon M. Gilbertson of Shepard Express described the album as a polished "modern disco" record. When the Horn Blows' Oliver Evans praised Ware's collaborations with producers Karma Kid and Lister, and likened the album to that of Madonna's Confessions on a Dancefloor (2005). In his review for Under the Radar, Kyle Mullin described Superbloom as a concept-driven album through its narrative of garden imagery. He further described the album as a confident continuation of her disco-pop era.

The Arts Desk felt Superbloom was consistent following her two previous releases. However, it was also noted that it lent itself more to the disco of the 1970s, while its predecessors dipped more into electronic influences. In a review for the Associated Press, Krysta Fauria complimented that the album was polished but lamented that it lacked drama and "incredulous heartache". Flood Magazine found the album to be polished but felt it was less grounded in comparison to her previous releases. The Guardian felt the album continued the trajectory she initially established with What's Your Pleasure. However, they noted the effort failed to "deliver the jolt" of the former release. Paste's Sam Rosenberg felt while Superbloom had the "extravagance that its title alludes to", he felt it felt less fresh in comparison to her two previous releases. In a three-star review for The Skinny, Rhys Morgan echoed Rosenberg's opinion regarding Superbloom's comparison to her previous releases, finding issue with the album's production.

== Commercial performance ==
Superbloom debuted at number two on the UK Albums Chart with 18,582 album-equivalent units, becoming Ware's highest-charting album on the chart. Elsewhere, the album entered at number one on the Scottish Albums Chart, and number seventy-three on the Irish Albums Chart.

== Track listing ==
Superbloom track listing
No.	Title	Writer(s)	Producer(s)	Length
1.	"The Garden Prelude"	Jessie Ware; Barney Lister	Lister	0:48
2.	"I Could Get Used to This"	Ware; Jon Shave; Sophia Brenan; Miranda Cooper	Lister; Shave; TommyD	3:41
3.	"Superbloom"	Ware; Lister; Will Bloomfield	Lister; TommyD	4:11
4.	"Automatic"	Ware; Kamille; Baz Kaye; Sam Knowles; Peter Brien; Les Baxter	Karma Kid; TommyD; Lister^{[ap]}	2:57
5.	"Chariots of Love Interlude"	Ware; Lister	Lister	0:27
6.	"Sauna"	Ware; Knowles; Holly Lapsley Fletcher	Karma Kid; Stuart Price	3:08
7.	"Mr Valentine"	Ware; Clementine Douglas; Kaye; Knowles	Lister; Karma Kid	3:25
8.	"Love You For"	Ware; Lister; Nate Campany	Lister	3:24
9.	"Ride"	Ware; Knowles; Jack Peñate; Ennio Morricone; James Ford; Clarence Coffee Jr.	Karma Kid; Price	4:39
10.	"Don't You Know Who I Am?"	Ware; Ford; Coffee Jr; Jake Shears; Midland	Ford; TommyD; Lister^{[vp]}	3:45
11.	"16 Summers"	Ware; Shave; Shungudzo	Lister; Shave; TommyD	4:41
12.	"No Consequences"	Ware; Tom McFarland; Peñate	Lister; TommyD; McFarland^{[ap]}	3:51
13.	"Mon Amour"	Ware; Lister; Campany	Lister; TommyD	3:45
Total length:				42:42

=== Notes ===
- ^{^[ap]} denotes an additional producer.
- ^{^[vp]} denotes a vocal producer.
- "Ride" contains an interpolation of Ennio Morricone's "The Good, the Bad and the Ugly" (1966).

== Personnel ==
The credits are adapted from Tidal.

=== Musicians ===
- Jessie Ware – vocals (all tracks), background vocals (tracks 1–4, 6–10, 12, 13)
- Barney Lister – keyboards (1, 12), guitar (1), drums (2, 3, 7), synthesizer (2, 4, 8, 12, 13), percussion (2, 8, 12, 13), background vocals (3, 9); programming, vocals (5); bass (11)
- Gareth Lockrane – flute (1, 3, 12, 13)
- Will Bloomfield – guitar (1); background vocals, keyboards (3)
- Kojo Johnson – background vocals (2–4, 6–8, 10, 12, 13), choir vocals (9)
- Natalie Williams – background vocals (2–4, 6–8, 10, 12, 13), choir vocals (9)
- Althea Edwards – background vocals (2–4, 6–8, 10, 12, 13)
- Wired Strings – string section (2–4, 10–13)
- Rosie Danvers – conductor (2–4, 10–13)
- Michael Trainor – violin (2–4, 10–13)
- Patrick Kiernan – violin (2–4, 10–13)
- Stephen Morris – violin (2–4, 10–13)
- Bryony James – cello (2–4, 10–13)
- Clifton Harrison – viola (2–4, 10–13)
- Sam Beste – keyboards (2, 8, 11, 13)
- Eloisa Fleur – violin (2, 10)
- Natalia Bonner – violin (2, 10)
- Nick Barr – viola (2, 10)
- Jon Shave – bass (2, 11); guitar, percussion, synthesizer (2)
- Kerenza Peacock – violin (3, 4, 11–13)
- Sarah Sexton – violin (3, 4, 11–13)
- Meghan Cassidy – viola (3, 4, 11–13)
- Tom Herbert – bass (3, 8, 12, 13)
- Dave Okumu – guitar (3, 8, 12)
- Jenny Sacha – violin (3, 11)
- Sam Knowles – keyboards (4), background vocals (5, 9), synthesizer (6, 7, 9), bass (6), programming (7), drums (9)
- Baz Kaye – bass, guitar (4, 7); keyboards, synthesizer (7)
- Ben Hancox – violin (4, 12, 13)
- Peter Brien – drums, percussion (4)
- Kamille – background vocals (4)
- Colman Domingo – narration (4)
- Aaron Wood – trumpet (4)
- Stuart Price – keyboards (6, 9), drums (6), syntheszier (9)
- Holly Laspley Fletcher – synthesizer (6)
- Erroll Burrows – background vocals (7, 8)
- Frank Burrows – background vocals (7, 8)
- Juno Burrows – background vocals (7, 8)
- Clementine Douglas – background vocals (7)
- Leo Taylor – drums (8, 12, 13)
- Dante Hemingway – percussion (13)
- Nate Campany – background vocals (8)
- Jack Peñate – background vocals, synthesizer (9, 12); guitar (9), percussion (12)
- Phebe Edwards – choir vocals (9)
- Tom McFarland – background vocals, synthesizer (12)

=== Technical ===
- Barney Lister – engineering (1–9, 12, 13)
- Jon Shave – engineering (2–4)
- Nick Taylor – engineering (2–4, 10–12)
- Ricky Damien – engineering (2–4, 7, 8, 11–13)
- Charlie Leake – engineering assistance (2–9, 11–13)
- Eva Valentin – engineering assistance (2–9, 11–13)
- George Lloyd-Owen – engineering assistance (2–9, 11–13)
- Dante Hemingway – engineering assistance, A&R (2–9, 11–13)
- Noah Bodley Scott – engineering assistance (2–9–13)
- Olly Thompson – engineering assistance (2–4, 10–13)
- Fabian Perez – engineering assistance (7, 8, 11–13)
- Federica Cottone – engineering assistance (7, 8, 11–13)
- Ben Baptie – mixing
- Joe LaPorta – mastering

== Charts ==
Chart performance
Chart (2026)	Peak position
Australian Albums (ARIA)	84
Belgian Albums (Ultratop Flanders)	35
Belgian Albums (Ultratop Wallonia)	43
Croatian International Albums (HDU)	30
French Physical Albums (SNEP)	104
Irish Albums (IRMA)	73
Polish Albums (ZPAV)	19
Portuguese Streaming Albums (AFP)	194
Scottish Albums (Official Charts)	1
Swiss Albums (Schweizer Hitparade)	87
UK Albums (Official Charts)	2

== Release history ==
Release history
Date	Format	Label	Ref.
17 April 2026	Cassette; CD; digital download; LP; streaming	EMI	
