= That! Feels Good! =

2023 album by Jessie Ware

Studio album by Jessie Ware
- Released: 28 April 2023
- Genres: Disco; Italo disco; funk; pop; R&B
- Length: 40:22
- Label: EMI
- Producers: James Ford; Stuart Price

Jessie Ware chronology
What's Your Pleasure? (2020)	That! Feels Good! (2023)	Superbloom (2026)

Singles from That! Feels Good!
- 1. "Free Yourself" Released: 19 July 2022; 2. "Pearls" Released: 9 February 2023; 3. "Begin Again" Released: 13 April 2023; 4. "Freak Me Now" Released: 27 July 2023; 5. "Hello Love" Released: 27 October 2023

That! Feels Good! is the fifth studio album by British singer-songwriter Jessie Ware, released on 28 April 2023 via EMI Records. Co-produced by Stuart Price and James Ford, whom she had worked with on her previous record What's Your Pleasure? (2020), Ware co-wrote all tracks alongside Shungudzo, Danny Parker, Clarence Coffee Jr., Sarah Hudson and its producers.

The album was met with critical acclaim, earning Ware a nomination for Album of the Year at the 2023 Mercury Prize, Ware's first nomination for the award since her debut album in 2012. Commercially, Ware gained her second top-three entry on the UK Albums Chart after What's Your Pleasure?, as well as her highest charting on the American Top Album Sales chart, peaking at number sixteen for one week.

Five singles were released to promote the album, including a version of the track "Freak Me Now" with Irish musician Róisín Murphy.

== Background and release ==
The album was released on 28 April 2023, 3 years after the release of Ware's fourth studio album What's Your Pleasure?, released in 2020, which received widespread critical acclaim for its "disco-inspired" sound. Pitchfork placed the upcoming album on its list for "The 34 Most Anticipated Albums of 2023", with Marc Hogan stating that "Ware stayed well within that 'sex and dancing' sweet spot" following the release of her single "Free Yourself", released on 19 July 2022, as a "taster" to the album.

Ware teased tracks of various genres, including R&B, house and soul. In an interview with Primavera Sound's "RPS Presents" podcast, she described the record as "Remember Where You Are" but a "bit more soulful".

The album's title was unofficially announced in January through a set of billboards in London of Ware. This was later confirmed by Ware on 3 February 2023 in a social media post asking fans "Can you feel it?", with the official announcement coinciding with the release of the single "Pearls" on 9 February. The exclamation mark that follows "That" in the album's title (and its first track) was the choice of songwriter Shungudzo, who had previously worked with Ware on her What's Your Pleasure? record.

A teaser of "Pearls" was released on 6 February, with the track being released on 9 February following a premiere on The Zoe Ball Breakfast Show on BBC Radio 2. On 31 March, Ware released a "Pearls" remix by Pabllo Vittar and Brabo. "Begin Again" was released as the third single from the album on 13 April.

Following the album's release, "Freak Me Now" was announced as the album's fourth single on 14 July 2023, with singer Róisín Murphy (who also has a cameo in the title track) collaborating with Ware to remix the track. The release date was announced the day after, 15 July, with the track released on 27 July. "Hello Love" was also announced as a single on 27 October 2023, with Ware describing the track as "the most sentimental song" on the record.

== Composition ==
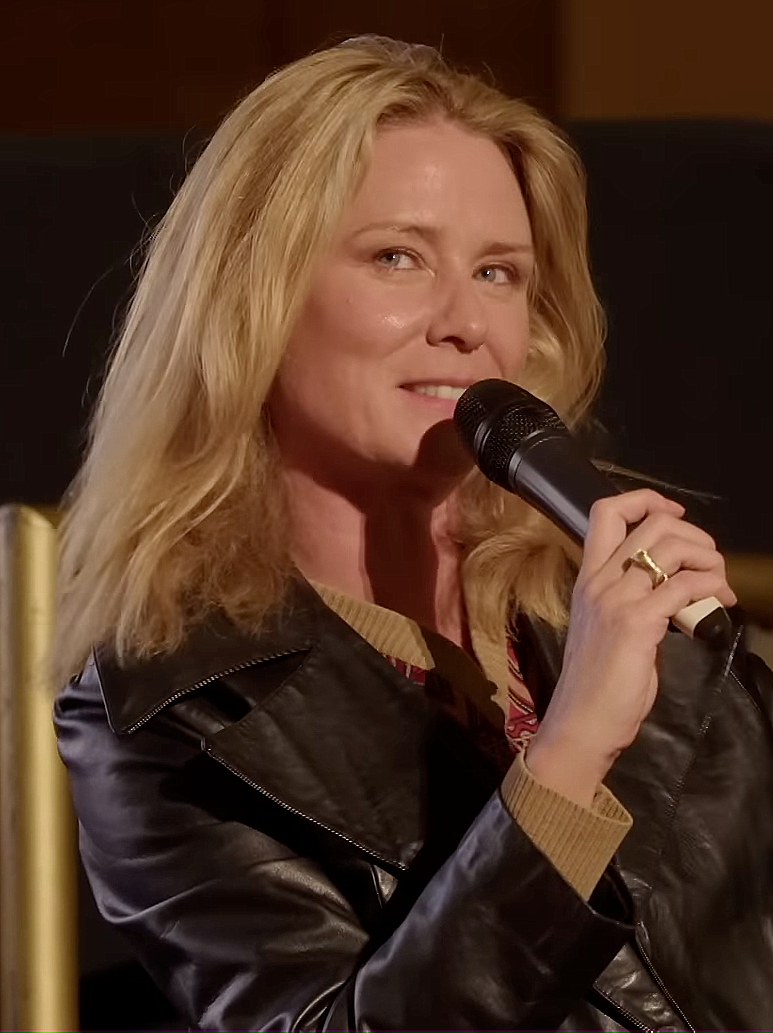
Róisín Murphy recorded her vocals for title track "That! Feels Good!" in an airport toilet.

The title track "That! Feels Good!" opens the record and features cameo vocals from various celebrities speaking the phrase, including singer Kylie Minogue (with whom Ware had collaborated on the single, "Kiss of Life" in 2021), actress Gemma Arterton (who appeared in the music video for "Remember Where You Are"), and Róisín Murphy (who recorded her vocals in an airport toilet and who would later work with Ware for a remix of "Freak Me Now"). Ware's rallying cries of "Just remember, pleasure is a right!" is underscored by "a supple, syncopated bassline". The verses of the track were compared to the rap on Blondie's "Rapture" by Paste's Eric Bennet. The second track, "Free Yourself", was released as the first single from the record in July 2022 following a debut at Ware's headline set at that year's Glastonbury Festival. The Italo disco song uses keyboard stabs reminiscent of diva house music, before Ware directly addresses the listener, asking them to "hold steady through life's turbulence": "Keep on moving up that mountain top [...] If it feels so good then baby, baby don't you—stop." "Pearls" is the third track on the album, and was released as the second single in February 2023. Inspired by Donna Summer, Evelyn "Champagne" King, Teena Marie and Chaka Khan, the "ascendant and evangelistic disco" track sees Ware "paint[ing] a three-dimensional picture" of herself: "I'm so 9-to-5, I'm a lady / I'm a lover, a freak and a mother." The pace of the album slows down for the fifth single, "Hello Love", a soft track that was inspired by soul-led and groove-led artists the Gap Band and Donny Hathaway.

The middle section of the record sees "Begin Again", the third single released in April 2023 and the final track on side A of the vinyl, was inspired by trips to Brazil and features brass instrumentals from Kokoroko. “Why does all the purest love get filtered through machines?” asks Ware in the pre-chorus, who jokingly said the lyric "probably came" from writing the song long-distance over Zoom, but then going to elaborate about "being a prisoner to screens". "Beautiful People" celebrates nightclubbing and the community of people you encounter whilst doing so: "Beautiful people are everywhere, everywhere" repeats Ware with "ping-ponging" energy. The French house "Freak Me Now" sees Ware get "loose and giddy", featuring a "euphoric refrain" reminiscent of Raheem the Dream's "If You Ain't Got No Money".

In the final section of the album, spoken word verses of "Shake the Bottle" see Ware recount fictional stories of ex-lovers: "Benny wants what Benny gets, broken hearts and cigarettes / I really liked Jackson but he lived too far away / Eddy was romantic but he never, ever paid". Ware drew comparisons to lip syncs on RuPaul's Drag Race and the melodrama of the song. The track was inspired by "Vogue", Grace Jones and the B-52's; its campness was compared to Countess Luann's "Money Can't Buy You Class" by The Independent's Adam White and Cristina's "sharply witty depictions of New York's 80s hipster demi-monde" by The Guardian's Alexis Petridis. Flirtatious innuendos tell the listener "That's the way to make my bottle pop!" "Lightning", a "gauzy trip-hop slow jam", sees Ware trace back to her R&B roots, taking hints from Sade, Madlib and Drake. The final track "These Lips" closes the record with "one last groovy dose of escapism", with a spoken word intro hinting at bringing the record full-circle.

== Critical reception ==
Professional ratings
Aggregate scores
Source	Rating
AnyDecentMusic?	8.4/10
Metacritic	89/100
Review scores
Source	Rating
AllMusic	4.5/5 stars
The Daily Telegraph	4/5 stars
Exclaim!	8/10
Financial Times	4/5 stars
The Guardian	5/5 stars
NME	4/5 stars
Pitchfork	8.3/10
The Skinny	4/5 stars
Slant Magazine	4/5 stars
The Times	4/5 stars

That! Feels Good! received widespread critical acclaim. Ware was praised for her "retro mood", creating a "maximalist tour de force of glossy pop sounds". At Metacritic, which assigns a weighted average rating out of 100 to reviews from mainstream publications, the album received an average score of 89, based on 19 reviews, indicating "universal acclaim", and being the highest rated album of her career, overtaking her debut album Devotion. Aggregator AnyDecentMusic? gave That! Feels Good! 8.4 out of 10, based on their assessment of the critical consensus.

Reviewing the album for AllMusic, Andy Kellman claimed that, "Vocally, Ware has somehow found another gear, turning in her most commanding performances while having what sounds like a ball with her background singers." Ludovic Hunter-Tilney of the Financial Times praised the record for shifting to "a more funk-and-soul-based sound", drawing comparisons to Chaka Khan's "majestic vocal attack" with Ware's single "Pearls". Eric Bennett of Paste wrote: "Part Madonna's Confessions on a Dance Floor, part Countess LuAnn's "Money Can't Buy You Class," That! Feels Good! is a record of sterling, mirrorball-lit songs and bawdy lyricism. It's Ware's finest collection of work to date." Alexis Petridis of The Guardian described it as "pop music made by people who really know what they're doing."

Sophie Williams of NME said this was Ware's "finest album of her career", calling it a "transformative experience". Julianne Escobedo Shepherd of Pitchfork commended its inspired take on disco, calling it "a genre revival album that's painstakingly true to its source material, but doesn't sound like a curdled rehash". Konstantinos Pappis compared the album to its predecessor in the review for Our Culture Mag, writing that, "it feels like Ware is able to tap into a kind of emotionality that was a bit more measured on What's Your Pleasure? While the new record gives off the impression the singer is joyously living through others as well as herself, those intertwined needs – to escape and connect – now have deeper grounding." Retropop Magazine said, "Jessie delivers the perfect record, breathing a breath of fresh air into the commercial charts while paying homage to the icons that influenced her journey to becoming one of the UK's premier artists of the past decade. It's that good!"

== Accolades ==
That! Feels Good! has been included in various mid-year and year-end best-albums-of-2023 lists, and was shortlisted at the Mercury Prize for Album of the Year.

Select mid-year and year-end rankings of That! Feels Good!
Publication	List	Rank	Ref.
Billboard	The 50 Best Albums of 2023 So Far: Staff Picks	N/A	
Het Parool	The Best Albums of 2023	4	
Pitchfork	The Best Music of 2023 So Far	N/A	
Pitchfork	The 50 Best Albums of 2023	22	
PopMatters	The 20 Best Pop Albums of 2023	1	
NME	The Best Albums of 2023	20	
Rolling Stone	Top 100 Albums of 2023	18	

Awards and nominations of That! Feels Good!
Year	Organization	Award	Result	Ref.
2023	Mercury Prize	Album of the Year	Shortlisted	

== Commercial performance ==
In the United Kingdom, That! Feels Good! opened and peaked at number three on the UK Albums Chart, becoming Ware's second album after What's Your Pleasure? (2020) to reach the top three. It also reached two number on the Album Sales Chart, the Physical Albums Chart and the Vinyl Albums Chart, while also peaking at number four on the Album Downloads Chart and number 60 on the Album Streaming Chart. The album also performed well regionally, peaking at number five on the Scottish Albums Chart.

Elsewehere, That! Feels Good! achieved top 30 placements in several territories, including number 25 on the Polish Albums Chart, number 28 on the Irish Albums Chart, and number 34 on the Portuguese Albums Chart. It also reached number 52 on the German Albums Chart, number 54 on the Belgian Albums Chart, and number 70 on the Swiss Albums Chart. In the United States, That! Feels Good! entered the US Top Album Sales chart at number 16, becoming Ware's highest-charting album since Tough Love (2014).

== Track listing ==
That! Feels Good! track listing
No.	Title	Writer(s)	Length
1.	"That! Feels Good!"	Jessie Ware; James Ford; Shungudzo Kuyimba; Daniel Parker	4:22
2.	"Free Yourself"	Ware; Clarence Coffee Jr.; Stuart Price	3:54
3.	"Pearls"	Ware; Coffee Jr.; Sarah Hudson; Price	4:03
4.	"Hello Love"	Ware; Ford; Kuyimba; Parker	4:42
5.	"Begin Again"	Ware; Ford; Kuyimba; Parker	5:24
6.	"Beautiful People"	Ware; Ford; Kuyimba; Parker	3:35
7.	"Freak Me Now"	Ware; Coffee Jr.; Price	3:28
8.	"Shake the Bottle"	Ware; Ford; Kuyimba; Parker	3:23
9.	"Lightning"	Ware; Coffee Jr.; Price	3:10
10.	"These Lips"	Ware; Ford; Kuyimba; Parker	4:21
Total length:			40:22

== Personnel ==
Credits adapted from the liner notes of That! Feels Good!

=== Musicians ===
- Jessie Ware – vocals
- James Ford – bass guitar, drums, guitar, keyboards, percussion, programming, synthesizer (tracks 1, 4–6, 8, 10); horn arrangement (1, 4–6, 10), string arrangement (4, 5)
- Danny Parker – background vocals (1, 4–6, 8, 10)
- Adenikè Zen – background vocals (3, 4, 7)
- Nile Bailey – background vocals (1, 3–6, 8, 10)
- Elize Kellman – background vocals (1, 4–6, 8, 10)
- Shanice Steele – background vocals (1, 4–6, 8, 10)
- Shungudzo Kuyimba – background vocals (1, 4–6, 8, 10)
- Sheila Maurice Grey – horn arrangement, trumpet (1, 4–6, 10)
- Dan Grech-Marguerat – programming (1, 4–6, 8–10)
- Chelsea Carmichael – tenor saxophone (1, 4–6, 10)
- Viva Msimang – trombone (1, 4–6, 10)
- Dave Okumu – drums (1, 6, 8)
- Dante Hemingway - programming, co-production (1, 4–6, 10)
- Stuart Price – background vocals, bass guitar, guitar, keyboards (2, 3, 7, 9); drums, piano (2); drum programming (3, 7, 9)
- Clarence Coffee Jr. – background vocals (2, 3, 7)
- Atlantic Horns – horns (2)
- Adam Blake – additional keyboards (3)
- Sarah Hudson – background vocals (3)
- Laura Moody – cello (4, 5)
- Richard Jones – string arrangement, viola (4, 5)
- Emma Smith – violin (4, 5)
- Jennymay Logan – violin (4, 5)
- "That! Feels Good!" features uncredited additional vocals by Kylie Minogue, Róisín Murphy, Gemma Arterton, Benny Blanco, Clara Amfo, Aisling Bea, Hayley Squires, Jamie Demetriou, and Ware's mother Lennie; and interpolations of "Blood on the Dance Floor", written and performed by Michael Jackson.

=== Technical ===
- James Ford – production, engineering (1, 4–6, 8, 10)
- Stuart Price – production, engineering (2, 3, 7, 9); mixing (2, 3, 7)
- Stuart Hawkes – mastering
- Dan Grech-Marguerat – mixing (1, 4–6, 8–10)
- Matt Jaggar – engineering (1, 4–6, 8, 10)
- Shungudzo Kuyimba – vocal production (1)
- Charles Haydon Hicks – mixing assistance (1, 4–6, 8–10)
- Luke Burgoyne – mixing assistance (1, 4–6, 8–10)
- George Chung – engineering assistance (1, 4–6, 8, 10)

=== Artwork ===
- Photography – Jack Grange
- Artwork – Rory Dewar

== Charts ==
Chart performance for That! Feels Good!
Chart (2023)	Peak position
Belgian Albums (Ultratop Flanders)	54
German Albums (Offizielle Top 100)	52
Irish Albums (Official Charts)	28
Polish Albums (ZPAV)	25
Portuguese Albums (AFP)	34
Scottish Albums (Official Charts)	5
Spanish Albums (Promusicae)	86
Swiss Albums (Schweizer Hitparade)	70
UK Albums (Official Charts)	3
US Top Album Sales (Billboard)	16

== Release history ==
That! Feels Good! release history
Region	Date	Formats	Edition	Labels	Refs.
Various	28 April 2023	Cassette; CD; digital download; LP; streaming	Standard	PMR; EMI	
