= Save a Kiss =

Single by Jessie Ware

from the album What's Your Pleasure?
- Released: 7 May 2020
- Genre: Euro disco; electropop; electro; hi-NRG; disco; R&B; deep house
- Length: 4:02 (album version); 3:38 (single version)
- Label: Virgin EMI
- Songwriters: Jessie Ware; James Ford; Shungudzo Kuyimbia; Danny Parker
- Producer: James Ford

Jessie Ware singles chronology
"Ooh La La" (2020)	"Save a Kiss" (2020)	"What's Your Pleasure?" (2020)

"Save a Kiss" is the fifth single by British singer-songwriter Jessie Ware from her fourth studio album, What's Your Pleasure? It was released 7 May 2020. It was written by Ware, James Ford, Shungudzo Kuyimbia and Danny Parker. Ford also produced the song.

== Background ==
The song premiered on Annie Mac's BBC Radio 1 segment Hottest Record on 7 May 2020 as the fifth single off Ware's fourth studio album, What's Your Pleasure?. It was released during the COVID-19 pandemic and Ware explained that the song "has taken on a new meaning during these weird times and it seems like the right time to put it out. This track is an optimistic one for me, I hope it resonates with people wherever they are right now. It's an upbeat song to dance along to and have fun with. I know I've got plenty of kisses I'm saving up for everyone when this is all over." Multiple critics compared the song to Robyn's 2018 studio album Honey.

== Music video ==
On 8 May 2020, Ware announced on her Instagram account that there would be a music video accompanying the song. She asked fans to learn the choreography, by Olivier Casamayou, and win the chance to be in the video. Ware and the dancers filmed themselves individually at home because of the COVID-19 pandemic. Vicky Lawton directed the video, which was released on 26 May 2020.

== Track listing ==
Digital download – single edit

1. "Save a Kiss" (single edit) – 3:38

Digital download – Totally Enormous Extinct Dinosaurs remix

1. "Save a Kiss" (Totally Enormous Extinct Dinosaurs remix) – 5:13

Digital download – PS1 remix

1. "Save a Kiss" (PS1 remix) – 3:05

== Credits and personnel ==
Credits adapted from Tidal and YouTube.

- Jessie Ware – vocals, songwriter
- Danny Parker – songwriter, background vocals
- James Ford – producer, songwriter, mixer, recording engineer, programming, synthesizer, percussion, keyboards, guitar, bass guitar, drums
- Shungudzo Kuyimba – songwriter, background vocals
- Midland – producer, additional producer, synthesizer, programming
- Joe LaPorta – mastering engineer
- Jules Buckley – string arranger, horn arranger, conductor/piano
- Lewis Jones – recording engineer
- George Oulton – assistant recording engineer
- Tom Pigott-Smith – violin
- Lizzie Ball – violin
- Marianne Haynes – violin
- Laura Melhuish – violin
- Kate Robinson – violin
- Charlie Brown – violin
- Nicky Sweeney – violin
- Jeremy Isaac – violin
- Hannah Dawson – violin
- Oli Langford – violin
- Vicci Wardman – viola
- Helen Kamminga – viola
- Reiad Chibah – viola
- Ian Burdge – cello
- Chris Worsey – cello
- Katherine Jenkinson – cello
- Tom Walsh – trumpet, flugelhorn
- Louis Dowdeswell – trumpet, flugelhorn
- Andy Wood – trumpet, flugelhorn
- Callum Au – trombone
- Dave Stewart – bass trombone

== Charts ==
Chart performance for "Save a Kiss"
Chart (2020)	Peak position
Croatia (HRT)	59
Scotland Singles (OCC)	48
UK Singles Downloads (OCC)	43
