= Ooh La La (Jessie Ware song) =

- Honey Dijon remix cover

Single by Jessie Ware

from the album What's Your Pleasure?
- Released: 24 April 2020
- Genre: Funk; disco
- Length: 3:48
- Label: Virgin EMI
- Songwriters: Jessie Ware; James Ford; Shungudzo Kuyimbia; Danny Parker
- Producer: James Ford

Jessie Ware singles chronology
"Spotlight" (2020)	"Ooh La La" (2020)	"Save a Kiss" (2020)

"Ooh La La" is a song by British singer-songwriter Jessie Ware from her fourth studio album, What's Your Pleasure? (2020). It was written by Ware, Danny Parker, Shungudzo Kuyimbia, and James Ford. Production was handled by Ford of the duo Simian Mobile Disco. The song was released on 24 April 2020. A remix by Miss Honey Dijon was released on 24 June 2020.

== Music video ==
The music video was released on 24 April 2020 on YouTube. It was directed by Gemma Yin. According to Ware, it was inspired by "innuendo, Pinter and surburbia".

== Track listing ==
- Digital download
1. "Ooh La La" – 3:46
- Digital download – Honey Dijon remix
1. "Ooh La La" (Honey Dijon remix) – 3:23

== Credits and personnel ==
Credits adapted from Tidal.

- Jessie Ware – vocals, songwriter
- Danny Parker – songwriter, background vocals
- James Ford – producer, songwriter, mixer, recording engineer, programming, synthesizer, percussion, keyboards
- Shungudzo Kuyimbia – songwriter, background vocals
- Joe LaPorta – mastering engineer
- Dave Okumu – guitar
- Leo Taylor – drums
- Bim Amoako-Gyampah – background vocals
- Senab Adekunle – background vocals
