= Remember Where You Are =

Single by Jessie Ware

from the album What's Your Pleasure?
- Released: February 5, 2021
- Genre: Soul; disco; gospel; chamber folk
- Length: 5:34 (album version); 3:29 (single version)
- Label: PMR; EMI; Universal Music
- Songwriters: Danny Parker; James Ford; Jessica Ware; Shungudzo Kuyimba
- Producer: James Ford

Jessie Ware singles chronology
"What's Your Pleasure?" (2020)	"Remember Where You Are" (2021)	"Please" (2021)

"Remember Where You Are" is a song by British singer and songwriter Jessie Ware. It was released on 5 February 2021 as the seventh & final single from her fourth studio album, What's Your Pleasure? The song was written by Ware and its producer James Ford alongside Danny Parker and Shungudzo Kuyimba.

The song was chosen by former US president Barack Obama as one of his favourite songs of 2020.

== Background and release ==
"Remember Where You Are" serves as the last track on Ware's fourth studio album, What's Your Pleasure?, which was released in June 2020.

The track came about after then President of the United States Donald Trump came to the United Kingdom on a state visit in June 2019. Following protests across London rallying against the visit, Ware created the intimate song, which takes inspiration from musicals such as Hair and the music of American singer-songwriter Minnie Ripperton (and more specifically her 1971 collaboration with Rotary Connection, "I Am the Black Gold of the Sun").

In an interview with the Official Charts Company, she talked about how she wanted to release the song as a single, "There's that sense of togetherness with it. The fact the chorus is not just me singing it, it's not meant to be. It is everyone together. For it now to be coming out during a pandemic… we can see that light at the end of the tunnel, it feels quite poignant to be bringing it out now. I believed in it so much that it is so nice that it has paid off. It's given me such confidence to trust my taste and that I knew what I was talking about. I'm learning more and more about myself and what makes me the artist that I am that people respond well to."

In January 2021, former US President Barack Obama chose the song as one of his favourite songs of 2020 in an annual playlist. Ware stated on social media that this was one of the reasons behind the song being issued as a single.

== Music video ==
The music video for the single, directed by Dominic Savage, was premiered exclusively to customers of British telecommunications provider O2 through their Priority rewards scheme on 25 February 2021, with a full release a day later on 26 February. Filmed during the third COVID-19 lockdown in the United Kingdom on 14 February, it features actress Gemma Arterton walking around the empty streets of London. The video ends with Arterton watching the sunrise on Primrose Hill.

Arterton was chosen as the actress for the video after comparisons that her and Ware looked alike, with Ware say it is "very weird [and] very generous" whilst calling it "the highest compliment". Arterton stated that filming the video was "a really memorable experience".

== Live performances ==
She performed the song live on The Graham Norton Show, on 5 February 2021. Talking about her performance she said, "I feel great. That Graham Norton performance… I've never had a TV performance that has done that. The response – this has never happened to me in my career. The fact I'm going to chart again with my album eight months down the line solely off the back of a performance of one song! I believed that Remember Where You Are could connect to people, particularly at this time. I'm very lucky that Graham allowed me to perform it. It's magic." She later performed the song live on The Tonight Show Starring Jimmy Fallon on 16 June 2021.

== Personnel ==
Credits adapted from Tidal.

- James Ford – producer, composer, lyricist, associated performer, bass guitar, drums, guitar, keyboards, mixer, percussion, programming, recording engineer, studio personnel, synthesizer
- Danny Parker – composer, lyricist, associated performer, background vocalist
- Jessica Ware – composer, lyricist, associated performer, vocals
- Shungudzo Kuyimba – composer, lyricist, associated performer, background vocalist
- Andy Wood – associated performer, flugelhorn, trumpet
- Bim Amoako-Gyampah – associated performer, background vocalist
- Callum Au – associated performer, trombone
- Charlie Brown – associated performer, violin
- Chris Worsey – associated performer, cello
- Dave Stewart – associated performer, bass trombone
- Hannah Dawson – associated performer, violin
- Helen Kamminga – associated performer, viola
- Ian Burdge – associated performer, cello
- Jeremy Isaac – associated performer, violin
- Jules Buckley – associated performer, conductor, horn arranger, piano, studio arranger
- Kate Robinson – associated performer, violin
- Katherine Jenkinson – associated performer, cello
- Laura Melhuish – associated performer, violin
- Lizzie Ball – associated performer, violin
- Louis Dowdeswell – associated performer, flugelhorn, trumpet
- Marianne Haynes – associated performer, violin
- Nicky Sweeney – associated performer, violin
- Nigel Black – associated performer, French horn
- Oli Langford – associated performer, violin
- Reiad Chibah – associated performer, viola
- Richard Pryce – associated performer, double bass
- Richard Watkins – associated performer, French horn
- Senab Adekunle – associated performer, background vocalist
- Tom Pigott-Smith – associated performer, violin
- Tom Walsh – associated performer, flugelhorn, trumpet
- Vicci Wardman – associated performer, viola
- Billy Foster – assistant recording engineer, studio personnel
- George Oulton – assistant recording engineer, studio personnel
- Joe LaPorta – mastering engineer, studio personnel
- Lewis Jones – studio personnel

== Charts ==
Chart performance for "Remember Where You Are"
Chart (2021)	Peak position
Euro Digital Song Sales (Billboard)	19
UK Singles Downloads (OCC)	8
