= Free Yourself (Jessie Ware song) =

Single by Jessie Ware

from the album That! Feels Good!
- Released: 19 July 2022
- Genre: Italo disco; house; dance-pop
- Length: 3:54
- Label: PMR; EMI
- Songwriters: Jessie Ware; Stuart Price; Clarence Coffee Jr.
- Producer: Stuart Price

Jessie Ware singles chronology
"Kiss of Life" (2021)	"Free Yourself" (2022)	"Pearls" (2023)

Music video
- "Free Yourself" on YouTube

"Free Yourself" is a song recorded by British singer-songwriter Jessie Ware. It was written by Ware, Clarence Coffee Jr. of the production team the Monsters & Strangerz, and Stuart Price for her fifth studio album That! Feels Good! (2023), while production was helmed by the latter. The song was released by PMR Records and EMI as the album's first single on 19 July 2022 and peaked at number 33 on the UK Singles Downloads chart.

== Background and release ==
Ware debuted "Free Yourself" during her headline set on The Park stage at the Glastonbury Festival 2022. It was later premiered on 19 July 2022 as the "Hottest Record in the World" on BBC Radio 1's Future Sounds show, marking her first single since the 2021 release of the extended Platinum Pleasure Edition of her most recent album What's Your Pleasure?. In a statement released to the press following the song's release, Ware said that this track "is the beginning of a new era" and that she's "so excited for people to have this song for the end of their summer; to dance, to feel no inhibitions, and to feel joyful because that's how I've been feeling recently being able to tour again and being able to sing again".

Four remixes of the single were subsequently released. The first was by Paul Woolford and was released on 12 August 2022. The second was by Eats Everything and was released on 19 August, subsequently being listed alongside the original track for a limited edition 7" vinyl release on 22 April 2023, Record Store Day. The third was by the Alias and was released on 16 September. The fourth was by Melanie C and was released on 3 November. The Paul Woolford and Eats Everything remixes were used in the "Be Who You Wanna Be" interval act of the Eurovision Song Contest 2023.

== Production and composition ==
"Free Yourself"
Accompanied by diva house instrumentals, Ware addresses the listener in "Free Yourself" telling them not to worry about & stay strong through life's uncertainty.

Echoing classic late 1980s italo-house, "Free Yourself" is produced by Stuart Price and co-written by Ware, Price and Clarence Coffee Jr. of the production team the Monsters & Strangerz. In an interview with Clara Amfo following the song's premiere on BBC Radio 1, Ware mentioned how she was initially hesitant to work with Price due to "being in a bubble with James Ford" (who she had worked with previously for What's Your Pleasure?).

Strong keyboard stabs reminiscent of the diva house genre start off the song, before building up and being accompanied with a selection of strings, brass instruments and drums, all acting as a background to Ware's vocals. The refrain of the song urges the listener to "hold steady through life's turbulence": "Keep on moving up that mountain top [...] If it feels so good then baby, baby don't you—stop."

== Critical reception ==
The song was generally well received by critics. George Griffiths from the Official Charts Company said the single "bursts out of What's Your Pleasure's [sic] shadow, as it should do" and that "this is a track clearly inspired by several motifs; CeCe Peniston, Erotica-era Madonna ('Deeper and Deeper' especially) and Studio 54 as the rent ran out and they were closing the shutters for the final time". Wren Graves from Consequence said that the song "opens with marching keyboards that add an air of drama before the beat drops", whilst Tomás Mier from Rolling Stone described the lyrics as "sexy" and the chorus as "infectious [and] funky". Pitchfork's Eric Torres calls the single "a sauntering floorfiller [...] eventually spinning out into a delirious breakdown in its last minute".

=== Year-end lists ===
The song subsequently went on to feature in various year-end rankings, including Pitchfork in their "The 100 Best Songs of 2022" list at number 49, with Jesse Dorris adding the track "takes Ware's blend of '70s disco and '80s boogie and shimmies it ecstatically into the '90s [...] without losing an ounce of charm." Billboard also added the song to their "The 100 Best Songs of 2022: Staff List" at number 33 and "The 50 Best Dance Songs of 2022: Critics' Picks" list, with it being described as "uncut dancefloor mania."

Select year-end rankings
Publication	List	Rank	Ref.
Pitchfork	The 100 Best Songs of 2022	49	
Billboard	The 100 Best Songs of 2022: Staff List	33	
Billboard	The 50 Best Dance Songs of 2022: Critics' Picks	N/A	
Gorilla vs. Bear	Gorilla vs. Bear's Songs of 2022	15	
Popjustice	Popjustice £20 Music Prize	Nominated	

== Music video ==
A music video for "Free Yourself" was released on 8 August 2022 at 5pm GMT. It was directed by Vicky Lawton, who had previously directed the videos for Ware's previous singles "Save a Kiss" (2020) and "What's Your Pleasure?" (2020). The video sees Ware sport an "extravagant ruby red dress," leading a congregation of dancers at a stately home through a ritualistic lecture of self-love and appreciation.

In an interview with Little Black Book, Lawton described the video as "very '70s rock 'n' roll, but with a pinch of the occult thrown in. Knowing I'd want to make the tone provocative, I needed to ensure there was the class and sophistication in the visuals to keep it chic. That meant keeping mystery and intrigue at the forefront, using references of decadence, silhouettes to tease and a heavenly glow throughout." Rob Jarvis was the director of photography for the shoot and Lawton described working with him as a "delightful experience".

== Track listing ==
Digital download

1. "Free Yourself" – 3:58

Digital download – Paul Woolford remix

1. "Free Yourself" (Paul Woolford remix) – 3:01
2. "Free Yourself" – 3:59

Digital download – Melanie C remix

1. "Free Yourself" (Melanie C remix) – 5:11

7" single

1. "Free Yourself" – 3:58
2. "Free Yourself" (Eats Everything remix) – 4:03

Digital download – The Alias remix

1. "Free Yourself" (The Alias remix) – 3:12
2. "Free Yourself" – 3:58
3. "Free Yourself" (Eats Everything remix) – 4:03
4. "Free Yourself" (Paul Woolford remix) – 3:01

Digital download – Eats Everything remix

1. "Free Yourself" (Eats Everything remix) – 4:03
2. "Free Yourself" (Paul Woolford remix) – 3:01
3. "Free Yourself" – 3:58

== Credits and personnel ==
Credits adapted from YouTube.

- Jessie Ware – vocals, songwriter
- Stuart Price – producer, songwriter, recording engineer, mixer, background vocals, piano, bass, guitar, keyboards, drums
- Clarence Coffee Jr – background vocals, songwriter
- Stuart Hawkes – mastering engineer
- Atlantic Horns – horns

== Charts ==
Chart performance for "Free Yourself"
Chart (2022–23)	Peak position
UK Singles Downloads (OCC)	33
