= Kiss of Life (Kylie Minogue and Jessie Ware song) =

2021 song by Kylie Minogue and Jessie Ware

Single by Kylie Minogue and Jessie Ware

from the album Disco: Guest List Edition
- Released: 29 October 2021
- Recorded: 2021
- Studio: Infinite Disco (Melbourne, Australia); Studio 53 (London, England)
- Genre: Disco
- Length: 3:13
- Label: Darenote; BMG
- Songwriters: Kylie Minogue; Jessie Ware; James Ford; Danny Parker; Shungudzo
- Producer: James Ford

Kylie Minogue singles chronology
"A Second to Midnight" (2021)	"Kiss of Life" (2021)	"Padam Padam" (2023)

Jessie Ware singles chronology
"Hot N Heavy" (2021)	"Kiss of Life" (2021)	"Free Yourself" (2022)

Music video
- "Kiss of Life" on YouTube

"Kiss of Life" is a song by Australian singer-songwriter Kylie Minogue and British singer-songwriter Jessie Ware. The song was released on 29 October 2021 as the second single from Disco: Guest List Edition, the reissue of Minogue's fifteenth studio album Disco (2020).

== Background and release ==
In September 2020, Minogue appeared on Ware's Table Manners podcast co-hosted with Ware's mother Lennie. In the episode, the pair spoke about writing together. Ware later joked that she'd "bullied" Minogue into a duet as the two further discussed a collaboration.

On 5 October 2021, Minogue announced the forthcoming reissue of Disco and revealed that the album's tracklist, including "Kiss of Life".

== Production and composition ==
"Kiss of Life" is written by Minogue, Ware, Danny Parker, Shungudzo and James Ford, with the latter also handling the track's production and mixing. Ware is a frequent collaborator with Ford, Parker and Shungudzo, with all having credits on her fourth studio album What's Your Pleasure? (2020). The song was recorded in London, with Minogue recording her vocals remotely in Melbourne.

== Music video ==
The music video for "Kiss of Life" premiered on YouTube at 6pm GMT on 4 November 2021. Directed by Sophie Muller, the video was shot in London's Ave Mario restaurant and features both Minogue and Ware, alongside dancers from the Theo Adams Company and Princess Julia. The video is inspired by the works of Pedro Almodóvar and 1980s telenovela. The video incorporates elements of farce, with Ware appearing as a busy restaurateur and Minogue as a troublesome food critic wreaking havoc among the guests, hence Ware's distress as the video progresses.

Ware is dressed in Saint Laurent, while Minogue first appears on screen wearing Valentino haute couture and later wears Saint Laurent. Remarking on the video's bold fashion and comedic themes, W writer Kyle Munzenrieder described it as a "high fashion fantasy version of Looney Tunes" and a "designer clothing-filled camp fest".

== Live performances ==
On 13 November 2021, Minogue and Ware performed "Kiss of Life" together for the first time on The Jonathan Ross Show. Ware performed her What's Your Pleasure? tour at O2 Academy Brixton on 28 May 2022, the same day as Minogue's 54th birthday, and Minogue was brought out as a special guest for a performance of "Kiss of Life". On 17 September 2023, Ware made a guest appearance with Minogue to perform the song during Minogue's headlining set at the Radio 2 in the Park festival in Victoria Park, Leicester. The collaboration garnered positive reviews, with Francesca Shillcock of Hello! hailing it as an "epic moment." Kate French-Morris, writing for The Daily Telegraph, commended Ware's genuine performance and described her as "the worthiest Kylie warm-up acts". Similarly, Shaun Curran of The i Paper called their performance "infectious," praising the choreography and noting that Minogue had never looked so comfortable on stage.

== Personnel ==
Credits are adapted from the liner notes of Disco: Guest List Edition:

- Kylie Minogue – lead vocals, songwriting
- Jessie Ware – lead vocals, songwriting
- Danny Parker – songwriting, backing vocals
- James Ford – songwriting, instruments, production, mixing
- Shungudzo Kuyimba – songwriting

== Charts ==
Chart performance for "Kiss of Life"
Chart (2021)	Peak position
UK Airplay (Radiomonitor)	15
UK Singles Downloads (OCC)	30
US Hot Dance/Electronic Songs (Billboard)	49

== Release history ==
Release dates and formats for "Kiss of Life"
Region	Date	Format	Label	Ref.
Various	29 October 2021	Digital download; streaming	Darenote; BMG	
