= Love Is 4 Suckaz/I'm a Sucka 4 Love =

Love is 4 Suckaz/I'm a Sucka 4 Love

Mixtape by Andra
- Released: 2010
- Genre: Pop
- Label: Krucial Noize

Love Is 4 Suckaz/I'm a Sucka 4 Love is the first official mixtape from Zimbabwean singer/songwriter Andra. It is produced by Kerry Brothers, Jr. (Alicia Keys' songwriting and production partner), Zeke MacUmber, and Andra herself. It was released in July, 2010.

== Track listing ==
No.	Title	Writer(s)	Length
1.	"Ow"	Alexandra Govere	3:35
2.	"Credit Card"	Govere	3:02
3.	"I'll let you buy me things (Skit)"	Govere	1:29
4.	"White Swans" (feat. Lupe Fiasco)	Govere, MacUmber, Lupe Fiasco	3:47
5.	"Ova There"	Govere, Ron Haney	3:48
6.	"Imagine That" (feat. Mateo)	Govere, Brothers	3:20
7.	"Models & Bottles" (feat. Rich Hil)	Govere, Jaanus Damsgard, Brooke R. Calder, a.k.a Lolly Pop.	3:42
8.	"Tattoo"	Govere, Haney, J-Vibe	4:38
9.	"Shooting Cupid"	Govere, Brothers	3:42
10.	"Break You Off" (feat. Kid Cudi)	Govere, MacUmber, The Roots, Scott Mescudi	2:22
11.	"Don't trust anyone with a picture of your d*ck (Skit)"	Govere	0:42
12.	"Blackmail"	Govere, MacUmber	3:58
13.	"1-888-ROBO-SEX (Skit)"	Govere	1:01
14.	"Robotic"	Govere	2:59
15.	"Obsessed" (feat. Drake)	Govere, MacUmber, Aubrey Graham	3:57
16.	"Friday Night Breakup"	Govere, MacUmber	3:07
17.	"Revenge on Men"	Govere	3:49
