= UK Community Foundations =

Registered charity

UK Community Foundations (UKCF) is a registered charity that leads a movement of community foundations committed to positive social change in the UK through the development of “community philanthropy”. Community philanthropy involves people from all parts of a community working together locally to use the financial and other resources available to them to improve others’ lives.

Previously Community Foundations Network, in February 2013 CFN relaunched as UK Community Foundations, with a renewed commitment to build thriving communities in the UK. UKCF also has a role as national membership association for community foundations which encompasses negotiating and managing national grant-making and funding opportunities on behalf of its members and providing direct technical assistance to member community foundations through its network. As a membership organisation its work is governed and directed by a board drawn from its members.

The network is collectively managing over £811m in endowment/endowed funds as of 2023 and distributes over £70m in grants each year. Community foundations manage funds donated by both individuals and organisations, while creating endowments and connecting donors to local needs.

== Community foundations ==
Community foundations are independent registered philanthropic institutions serving geographically defined territory. They act as grant-making foundations, giving grants to support development projects. Their stated mission is to improve the quality of life in a community. They are supported by a broad range of private as well as public donors and seek contributions primarily from inside the community. They are governed by local boards and build capital endowments with the aim of ensuring funding capability in perpetuity.

== History ==
The first community foundation to be founded in the UK was Swindon in 1975. This later merged with the Wiltshire Community Trust to form the present Community Foundation for Wiltshire and Swindon. By 2010 there were 58 community foundations in the United Kingdom that cover 95% of the country.

UKCF was established in 1991 to stimulate the growth of new community foundations, develop and co-ordinate a code of good practice and encourage foundations to share knowledge across the UK. In 2001 the UKCF received major recognition when community foundations were chosen by the Government’s Children and Young People’s Unit as the best partners for the Local Network Fund. In 2003 the UKCF was chosen as the trustee of the Fair Share Trust programme, which is funded by the Big Lottery Fund. In 2006 a Quality Accreditation (QA) programme was established by UKCF. The Charity Commission for England and Wales endorses the QA standards and processes in a three-year cycle, which notes the focus on quality in all aspects of community foundation work.

In 2013-14 community foundations across the UK generated more than £9m in private donations for communities, as well as more than £6m from businesses and a further £7m from government. They support more than 1,000 large donor clients, have £500m of endowed funds under their management, and every year around 21,000 grants are made across the UK. There are more than 1,000 volunteers that provide national and local grassroots information; they are supported by 420 staff. There have been ten foundations that have received one-off donations exceeding £1 million during this period.

== Programmes and funding ==
UK Community Foundations was responsible for ensuring the implementation of the £50 million UK-wide Fair Share Trust programme, funded by the Big Lottery Fund. Also, on behalf of Comic Relief they distribute some of the funds raised through Red Nose Day and Sport Relief through the network of local community foundations. 48 community foundations were Local Funders for Grassroots Grants, a government programme comprising an £80 million grant programme and a £50 million endowment match challenge. UKCF also managed the grants component of the Mars in the Community investment programme to 2010 with employee involvement.

UK Community Foundations partnered with the Evening Standard’s Dispossessed Campaign which raised £5 million to be distributed to local charities and projects within London and is managed by The London Community Foundation.

== Partnerships ==
UK Community Foundations acts as an umbrella to promote and support philanthropy in the UK and has a number of partnerships:

=== The Beacon Fellowship ===
The Beacon Fellowship Charitable Trust was established to encourage individual contributions to charitable and social causes and to celebrate and showcase best practice in giving. It awards prizes for philanthropy, now managed by UK Community Foundations, which recognises individuals who have transformed other people’s lives through their gifts of time, skills and money. Previous winners have included Jamie Oliver, Bob Geldof and Zac Goldsmith.

=== Fair Share Trust ===
UK Community Foundations was responsible for using its local giving expertise to ensure the effective implementation of the £50 million UK-wide Fair Share Trust (FST) programme, funded by the Big Lottery Fund. The Fair Share Trust’s aim was to build community skills, confidence, experience, and networks to improve local neighbourhoods. They help local communities to make a difference, by putting regeneration into their hands. The network of 27 local delivery partners works with communities in 80 neighbourhoods across the UK.

=== Localgiving ===
Localgiving is a social enterprise and Limited Company that operates as a not-for-profit. It was founded as Localgiving.com in 2008 by Marcelle Speller and is jointly owned by UK Community Foundations and the Ardbrack Foundation; both are registered charities and 50% shareholders.

Localgiving.org is a website for local charities and community groups to raise money, awareness and support. It allows registered and unregistered charities to claim Gift Aid as all donations are processed through their local community foundation which vets each group. The website allows supporters and donors to search for and find small charities and voluntary organisations in their community.
