= Spotlight (Jessie Ware song) =

2020 single by Jessie Ware

Single by Jessie Ware

from the album What's Your Pleasure?
- Released: 28 February 2020
- Genre: House; nu-disco; pop; acid house; electronica
- Length: 5:31 (album version); 4:12 (single version)
- Label: Virgin EMI
- Songwriters: Jessie Ware; James Ford; Shungudzo Kuyimbia; Danny Parker
- Producer: James Ford

Jessie Ware singles chronology
| "Time After Time" (2019) | "Spotlight" (2020) | "Ooh La La" (2020) |

Music video
- "Spotlight" on YouTube

"Spotlight" is a song recorded by British singer-songwriter Jessie Ware for her fourth studio album, What's Your Pleasure? (2020). A primarily house and nu-disco record singing about "longing and lust", it was written by Ware, Danny Parker, Shungudzo Kuyimba, and James Ford, while production was handled by the latter. Altogether with an accompanying music video where the singer sings and dances on Tito's Blue Train, the single version was released on 28 February 2020 as the third single from the album, with a remix by Icarus being released on 27 March 2020 later.

== Critical reception ==
"Spotlight" was raved with critical acclaim. Noah Yoo from Pitchfork said that "Spotlight" drips "with the hallmarks of a long-lost city pop classic; Ware's sultry vocals, nearly a whisper, float atop beds of string flourishes and synthesizer swells courtesy of Simian Mobile Disco’s James Ford. Every aspect of 'Spotlight' — from its heart-wrenching final line to the subtle acid house conclusion — betrays the handiwork of real studio experts." ABC music critic Dan Condon found that "this is the kind of pulsing, alluring, maturely crafted pop that we've come to expect from the 35-year-old Londoner. It's a sophisticated take on the modern disco phenomenon that's making pop music sound so good these days; at times you'll hear shades of Sade, at others Róisín Murphy, but it's Ware's immense talent that shines through." YouTuber and music critic Anthony Fantano ranked the single fourth on his "50 best songs of 2020" list, calling it the "biggest dance anthem of the year" and a "sparkling throwback to the disco era, touched up with gorgeous strings".

Editors of PopMatters, Mick Jacobs, Jessica Brant, and Mike Elliott described the song as a "smooth pop masterpiece of driving rhythms, understated vocals, and lyrics of longing and lust," inspired by the "underground voguing scene of 1980s NYC." Billboard editor Krystal declared "Spotlight" a "slow-burner, it's sweet yet sultry, with a touch of acid to add some tension," while MTV News critic Bob Marshall felt that the song "changes gear into a '90s R&B-inspired disco track that fans of Toni Braxton will no doubt want to spin on repeat." Idolator's Mike Wass ranked the song second on his The 30 Best Pop Songs of Q1/2020 listing and called it a "divine disco anthem," adding: "Pop this soulful and sophisticated only comes around once or twice a year."

== Music video ==
The accompanying music video for "Spotlight" was filmed in Belgrade, Serbia aboard Tito's Blue Train, the private transport of President of Yugoslavia Josip Broz Tito. It was directed by Jovan Todorović. The music video was released through Ware's official YouTube channel on 28 February 2020.

== Track listing ==
Digital download – single edit

1. "Spotlight" (single edit) – 4:12

Digital download – Icarus remix

1. "Spotlight" (Icarus remix) – 3:58

== Credits and personnel ==
Credits adapted from Tidal.

- Jessie Ware – vocals, songwriter
- Danny Parker – songwriter
- James Ford – producer, songwriter, mixer
- Shungudzo Kuyimba – songwriter
- Joe LaPorta – mastering engineer

== Charts ==
Chart performance for "Spotlight"
| Chart (2020) | Peak position |
|---|---|
| Scotland Singles (OCC) | 38 |
| UK Singles Downloads (OCC) | 32 |
