= The London Community Foundation =

British charity formed in 2012

The London Community Foundation is a registered community development charity in London, formed in 2012. Its aim is to bring about positive social change, to help Londoners facing disadvantage. Operating pan-London in 32 boroughs, it gives out grants (typically ranging from £500 to £50,000) to a range of charities and community groups across the city. It specialises in funding small and medium-sized community-based projects that do not attract mass public support. The London Community Foundation’s work is funded by individual philanthropists, companies, trusts, central and local government, social enterprises such as housing groups, and clinical commissioning groups.

== History ==
In 1995, the South East London Community Foundation was formed to cover boroughs in South East London. In 2007, it became the Capital Community Foundation, operating across London and having merged with Thames Community Foundation. The Capital Community Foundation merged with the North West London Community Foundation and East London Community Foundation in 2012, to form a consolidated pan-London Community Foundation. In its 22-year history, The London Community Foundation has given out almost £55 million to more than 10,000 charitable projects in London. It is one of 46 community foundations in the United Kingdom.

== Partnerships ==
The London Community Foundation works in partnership with The London Evening Standard to deliver the Evening Standard Dispossessed Fund. It also works with The London Mayor’s Office for Policing and Crime (MOPAC) to give out funding to benefit victims of crime across London, and with Comic Relief to distribute funds raised through Red Nose Day and Sport Relief.

== Activities ==
In addition to supporting beneficiary groups through a guided grant application and assessment process, The London Community Foundation delivers capacity-building work to help community groups to sustain and grow their operations in the long term.
