= Danny Parker (songwriter) =

American songwriter

Daniel Parker is an American songwriter. He has co-written pop songs for artists such as Nick Jonas, Shawn Mendes, Jessie Ware and James Blunt. He has co-written James Blunt's single "Heart to Heart”, Nick Jonas’ “Chains” and “Teacher”, Zedd's “Daisy”, and Shawn Mendes’ multi-platinum “Stitches”. Danny also co-wrote Shawn Mendes’ single, “Mercy”, Britney Spears’ “Liar”, and “Sudden Death (OMG)” by Tyler Glenn and has worked with artists Jessie Ware, Louisa Johnson, and Missy Higgins. His most recent releases include, "Should I Give It All Up" by James Blunt, "Sing It With Me" by JP Cooper, "Champions" by James Blunt, "Say It First" by Role Model, "Sad Eyes" by James Arthur, and 6 songs on the latest Jessie Ware album, What’s Your Pleasure?

Parker has an artist project titles Model Child. His releases include, "Trash," "My Queer Teenage Anthem," "Power," "Strawberry Bowl," "Drain Me," "Animal Noise," "Cuckoo," "Icicles," "Pilot," "Up From The Bottom," "Alien," "Into The Water," and "For You." His debut album is titled Drop Out and features 10 original songs, written by Parker. He also released a four-song EP titled Unscrewed.

== Songwriting discography ==
Year	Artist	Song	Album
2013	James Blunt	"Heart to Heart"	Moon Landing
2013	James Blunt	"Smoke Signals"	Moon Landing
2013	Prince Royce	"You Are Fire"	Soy el Mismo
2014	Madi Diaz	"Ashes"	Phantom
2014	Madi Diaz	"Tomorrow"	Phantom
2014	Madi Diaz	"Pictures"	Phantom
2015	Shawn Mendes	"Stitches" (certified platinum by the RIAA)	Handwritten
2015	Nick Jonas	"Chains" (certified platinum by the RIAA)	Nick Jonas
2015	Nick Jonas	"Teacher"	Nick Jonas
2015	Zedd	"Daisy"	True Colors
2016	Birdy	"Save Yourself"	Beautiful Lies
2016	Chris Lane	"Circles" (featuring MacKenzie Porter)	Girl Problems
2016	Shawn Mendes	"Mercy"	Illuminate
2016	Britney Spears	"Liar"	Glory
2017	Tyler Glenn	"Sudden Death (OMG)"	Excommunication
2017	Louisa Johnson	"Best Behaviour"	Best Behaviour - Single
2017	James Blunt	"Bartender"	The Afterlove
2017	James Blunt	"Over"	The Afterlove
2017	Rationale	"Tumbling Down"	Rationale
2017	Jessie Ware	"Stay Awake, Wait for Me"	Glasshouse
2017	Jessie Ware	"Your Domino"	Glasshouse
2017	Jessie Ware	"Love to Love"	Glasshouse
2017	Missy Higgins	"49 Candles"	Solastalgia
2017	Ruston Kelly	"Hollywood"	Halloween
2018	Plested	"First Time"	First Time - Single
2018	Matt Nathanson	"Mine"	Sings His Sad Heart
2018	Matt Nathanson	"Gimme Your Love"	Sings His Sad Heart
2018	Jessie Ware	"Overtime"	Overtime - Single
2019	JP Cooper & Astrid S	"Sing It With Me"	Sing It With Me - Single
2019	James Arthur	"Sad Eyes"	You
2019	James Blunt	"Champions"	Once Upon A Mind
2019	James Blunt	"Youngster"	Once Upon A Mind
2019	Role Model	"Say It First"	oh, how perfect - EP
2019	Model Child	"Power"	Power - Single
2019	Model Child	"Trash"	Trash - Single
2019	Model Child	"My Queer Teenage Anthem"	My Queer Teenage Anthem - Single
2019	Gryffin	"If I Left The World" (feat. MARINA & Model Child)	Gravity
2020	Jessie Ware	"Spotlight"	What's Your Pleasure?
2020	Jessie Ware	"What's Your Pleasure?"	What's Your Pleasure?
2020	Jessie Ware	"Ooh La La"	What's Your Pleasure?
2020	Jessie Ware	"Soul Control"	What's Your Pleasure?
2020	Jessie Ware	"Save a Kiss"	What's Your Pleasure?
2020	Jessie Ware	"Remember Where You Are"	What's Your Pleasure?
2020	James Blunt	"Should I Give It All Up (demo)"	Once Upon A Mind (Time Suspended Edition)
2020	Model Child & Claud Mintz	"Cuckoo - Claud Remix"	Cuckoo - Claud Remix
2020	Model Child	"Strawberry Bowl"	Dropout
2020	Model Child	"Cuckoo"	Dropout
2020	Model Child	"Animal Noise"	Dropout
2020	Model Child	"Drain Me"	Dropout
2020	Model Child	"No Sleep in the City of Angels"	Dropout
2020	Model Child	"Trend"	Dropout
2020	Model Child	"The Past is a Pretty Gun"	Dropout
2020	Model Child	"Depression"	Dropout
2020	Model Child	"Sick"	Dropout
2020	Model Child	"Sewage"	Dropout
2021	Jessie Ware	"Hot N Heavy"	What's Your Pleasure? (The Platinum Pleasure Edition)
2021	Jessie Ware	"Please"	What's Your Pleasure? (The Platinum Pleasure Edition)
2021	Jessie Ware	"Pale Blue Light"	What's Your Pleasure? (The Platinum Pleasure Edition)
2021	Jessie Ware	"Eyes Closed"	What's Your Pleasure? (The Platinum Pleasure Edition)
2021	Model Child	"Pilot"	Unscrewed
2021	Model Child	"Zero"	Unscrewed
2021	Model Child	"Zipper"	Unscrewed
2021	Model Child	"Origin"	Unscrewed
2021	Model Child	"Icicles"	Icicles - Single
2021	Jenny Owen Youngs	"Dungeons and Dragons"	Echo Mountain
2021	Kylie Minogue & Jessie Ware	"Kiss of Life"	Disco: Guest List Edition
2021	ill peach	"GUM"	GUM - Single
2021	ill peach	"WILDFIRE"	EXCUSE ME WHILE WE FIND OUR MINDS - EP
2021	ill peach	"NEED YOU NOW"	EXCUSE ME WHILE WE FIND OUR MINDS - EP
2021	Model Child	"Up From The Bottom"	Up From The Bottom - Single
2022	Machine Gun Kelly	"pretty toxic revolver"	lockdown sessions - Single
2022	Model Child	"Alien"	Alien - Single
2022	Pussy Riot, REI AMI & Kito	"PLAYTHING"	PLAYTHING - Single
2023	Manchester Orchestra	"Capital Karma"	Capital Karma - Single
2023	Jessie Ware	"That! Feels Good!"	That! Feels Good!
2023	Jessie Ware	"Hello Love"	That! Feels Good!
2023	Jessie Ware	"Begin Again"	That! Feels Good!
2023	Jessie Ware	"Beautiful People"	That! Feels Good!
2023	Jessie Ware	"Shake the Bottle"	That! Feels Good!
2023	Jessie Ware	"These Lips"	That! Feels Good!
2023	Rusty Santos & Jackie Mendoza	"Halo Dive"	Halo Dive - Single
2023	Model Child	"Into The Water"	Into The Water - Single
2023	Model Child	"For You"	For You - Single
2023	Jessie Ware	"Hello Love"	Hello Love - Single
2023	Model Child	"My Angel"	My Angel - Single
2023	Model Child	"Tough Guys"	Tough Guys - EP
2024	Model Child	"Headlights"	Headlights - Single
2024	Model Child	"Overdrive"	Overdrive - Single
2024	Model Child	"Hard Enough"	Hard Enough - Single
2024	Model Child	"Joy Rider"	Get There!
2024	Model Child	"In Your Blood"	Get There!
2024	Model Child	"Shine a Light"	Get There!
2024	Model Child	"Hotter n' Hotter"	Get There!
2024	Model Child	"SPORTS"	SPORTS - Single
2024	Model Child	"Cherish You"	Cherish You - Single
