= Jessie Ware =

British singer (born 1984)

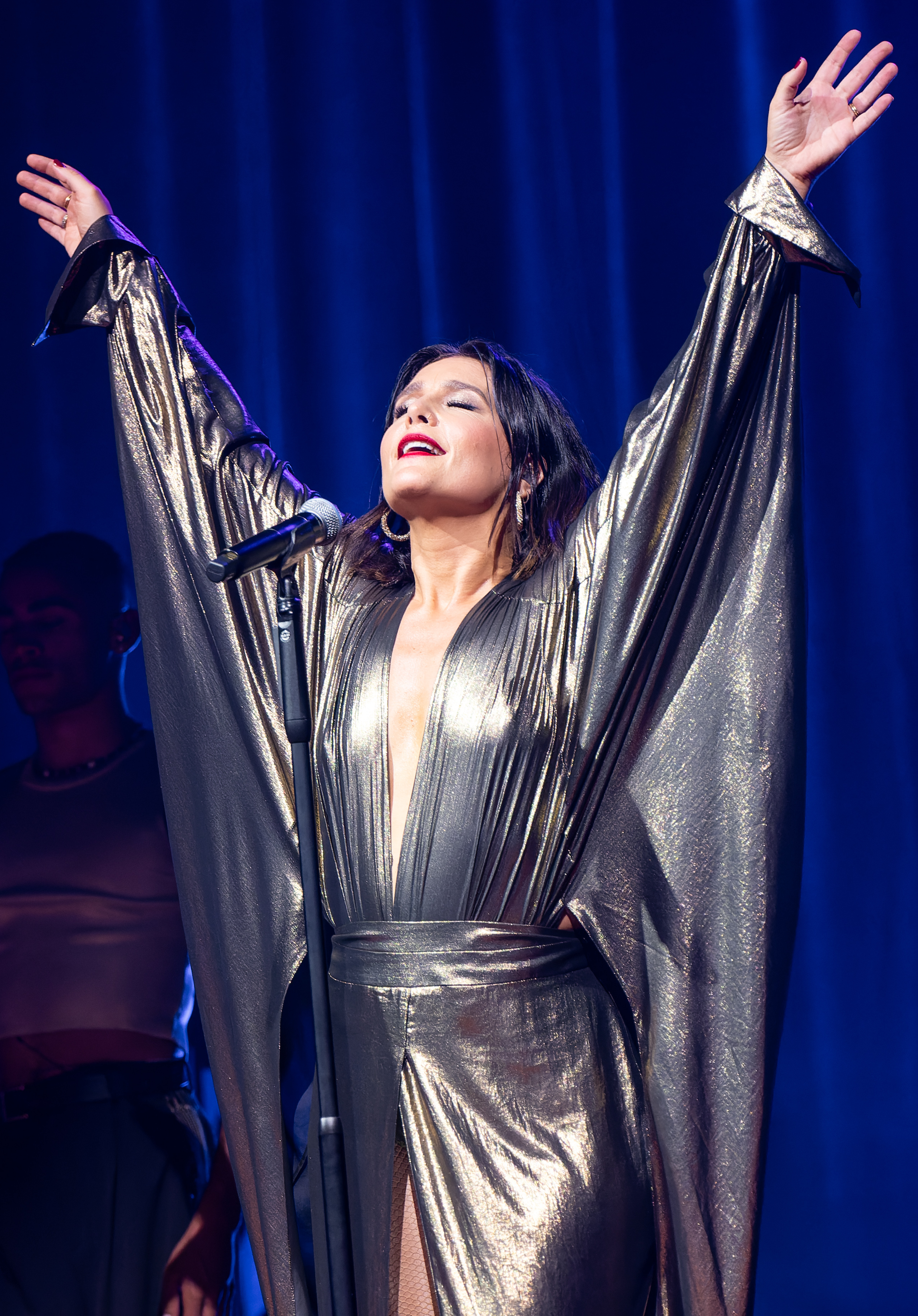
- Ware performing in 2022

Background information
- Born: Jessica Lois Ware; 15 October 1984 (age 42); London, England
- Genres: Pop; disco; R&B; electronic; soul
- Occupations: Singer; songwriter
- Instrument: Vocals
- Years active: 2009–present
- Labels: PMR; Island; Cherrytree; Interscope; Young; Virgin EMI; EMI
- Publisher: UMPG
- Spouse: Sam Burrows (m. 2014)
- Children: 3
- Website: jessieware.com

Jessica Lois Ware (born 15 October 1984) is a British singer and songwriter. She came to prominence following the release of her debut album, Devotion (2012), which peaked at number five on the UK Albums Chart and produced the single "Wildest Moments". Her second album, Tough Love (2014), reached number nine in the UK and produced the singles "Tough Love" and "Say You Love Me". Her third album, Glasshouse (2017), reached number seven in the UK.

Ware switched to a disco-influenced sound for her fourth album, What's Your Pleasure? (2020), which was released to critical acclaim, reached number three in the UK, and produced the singles "Spotlight", "Save a Kiss" and "Remember Where You Are". Her fifth album, That! Feels Good! (2023), produced the single "Free Yourself" and reached number three in the UK, as well as peaking at number sixteen in the Top Album Sales chart in the US. Ware has received accolades including seven Brit Awards nominations including one for Best New Artist and four for British Female Solo Artist and two Mercury Prize nominations.

In 2018, Ware began co-hosting Table Manners alongside her mother Lennie, a podcast about "family, food and the art of a good old chit-chat", available to online streaming platforms.

== Early life ==
Ware was born at Queen Charlotte's Hospital in Hammersmith, London, on 15 October 1984. She was raised in Clapham, London. She is the daughter of Helena "Lennie" Ware (née Keell), a social worker, and John Ware, a BBC Panorama reporter, who divorced when she was 10. She is the younger sister of English actress Hannah Ware. Her mother was supportive in her early musical career and Ware considers her to be "her hero", saying "She brought up my sister, brother and me with so much love and fun and always told me I could do anything I want." Ware's mother is Jewish and she was raised in the faith.

Ware was educated at Alleyn's School, a co-educational independent school in Dulwich in South London, where she was a schoolmate of Florence Welch, Jack Peñate, and Felix White of the Maccabees. She then attended the University of Sussex, where she graduated with a degree in English literature. After her studies, Ware briefly worked as a journalist at The Jewish Chronicle, did sports journalism at The Daily Mirror and worked behind the scenes at TV company Love Productions. There, she was a colleague of Erika Leonard, otherwise known as E. L. James, the author of Fifty Shades of Grey.

== Music career ==
=== 2009–2011: Career beginnings ===
In the years prior to releasing her first solo album, Ware did backing vocals at live shows for Jack Peñate (who took her on tour in the U.S.) and Man Like Me. Ware said she learned a lot during her time with Jack Peñate: "Performing with him was really good training, because I got to learn all about how other people do it – I was able to perform live without the pressure of being a lead singer. It gave me a taste of what to expect, and it prepared me for what I'm doing now."

One of Peñate's bandmates, Tic, introduced Ware to SBTRKT; Ware and SBTRKT went on to collaborate on "Nervous" (2010). She consequently met Sampha, then known as SBTRKT's main collaborator. They created "Valentine" together, which was released on a special-edition, heart-shaped vinyl by Young Turks in 2011. "Valentine" was partly inspired by James Blake's song "The Wilhelm Scream" and based on their personal experiences in love. The music video for "Valentine" was directed by Marcus Söderlund. "Nervous", "Valentine" and an additional collaboration with DJ Joker ("The Vision") led Ware to a record deal with PMR Records. She also featured on Ceremonials, the 2011 album by Florence and the Machine in which her good friend Florence Welch is lead singer.

On 14 October 2011, Ware released her debut solo single, "Strangest Feeling", on limited 10" purple vinyl. The song did not chart on the UK Singles Chart.

=== 2011–2013: Devotion ===
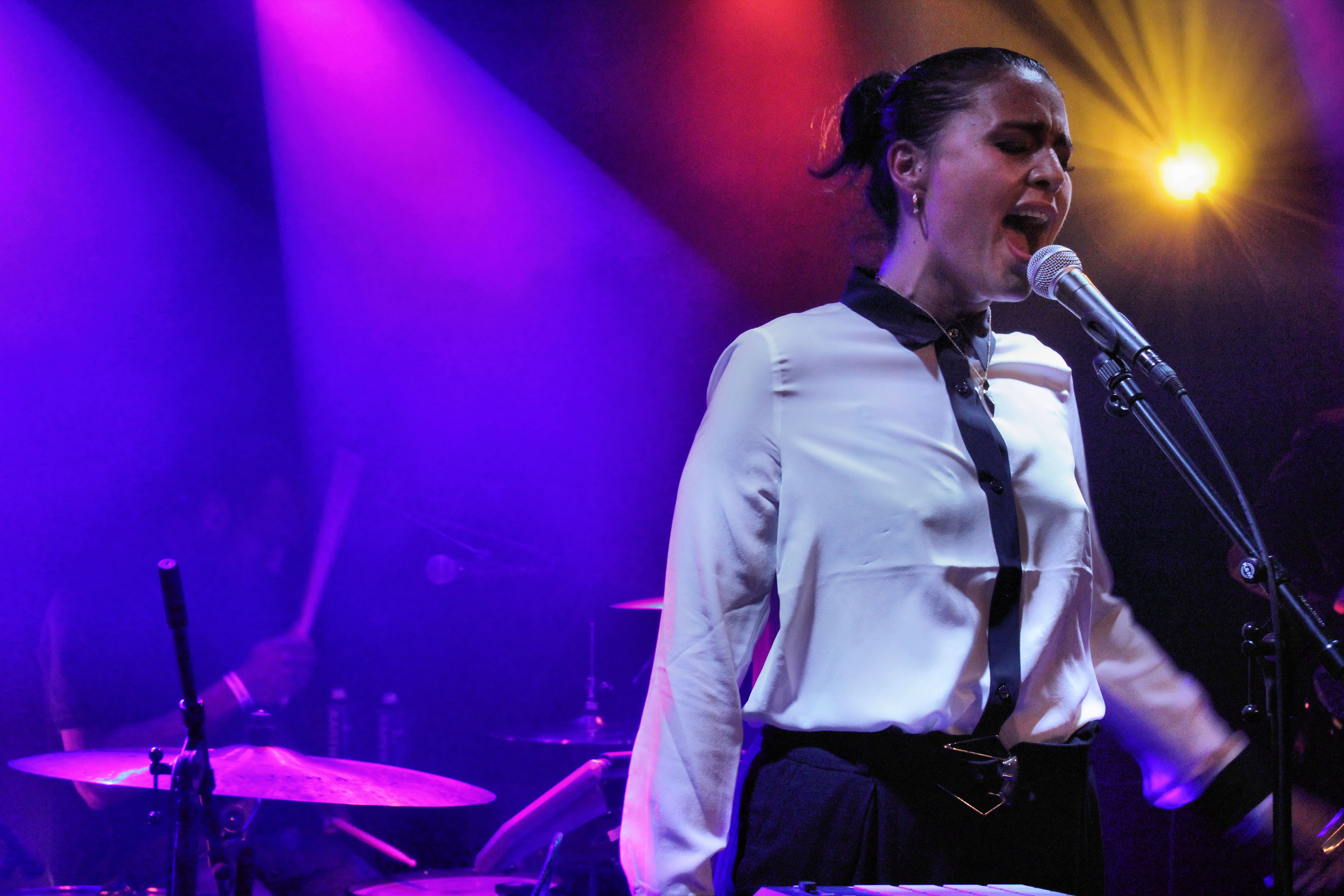
Ware performing at the Eurosonic 2012 Festival

On 20 August 2012, Ware released her debut album, Devotion, which peaked at number five on the UK Albums Chart. The album's lead single, "Running", was released on 24 February 2012. "110%" was released as the album's second single on 13 April, peaking at number 61 in the United Kingdom. "Wildest Moments" was released as the album's third single on 29 June, peaking at number 46 in the United Kingdom. "Night Light" was released as the fourth single on 24 August.

Devotion was announced as a nominee for the prestigious Mercury Prize that year. Ware toured in the United Kingdom in the early part of March 2013, supported by Laura Mvula, starting with Cambridge, Manchester, Glasgow, Birmingham, Oxford, Bristol and ending in London. The United Kingdom tour was followed by a European tour in the second half of March 2013 and a US tour in April 2013. In the summer of 2013, Ware played many festivals all over the world, and at the end of 2013, Jessie went on tour in the United States again.

=== 2014–2018: Tough Love and Glasshouse ===
Ware's second album, Tough Love, was released on 6 October 2014. Ware began writing the album earlier that year. The album peaked at number nine on the UK Albums Chart, becoming her second top ten album. "Tough Love" was the first single to be taken from the album and released on 3 August 2014. "Tough Love" was compared to "Prince at his minimalist '80's best" by Pitchfork. "Tough Love" is produced together with BenZel, the production duo composed of London post-bass producer Two Inch Punch and mega-producer Benny Blanco who Ware previously worked with on the single "If You Love Me"; Benzel are also executive producers of the album. Ed Sheeran co-wrote the song "Say You Love Me". Ware played the Wilderness Festival (7–10 August 2014); a pair of additional dates at Berlin Festival 2014 (6 July 2014) and Sopot Gulf of Art (26 July 2014) that year.

Ware contributed "The Crying Game", a song for Nicki Minaj's third album, The Pinkprint (2014), in which Minaj alternates between "devastating verses and pensive crooning" whilst Ware adds "haunting" and "soulful" vocals to the chorus. Originally, Ware only received a songwriting credit, but she was also credited for her backing vocals on updated versions of the album. She co-wrote the song "New Man" for Ed Sheeran's third album, ÷, and provided background vocals on it and two other songs.

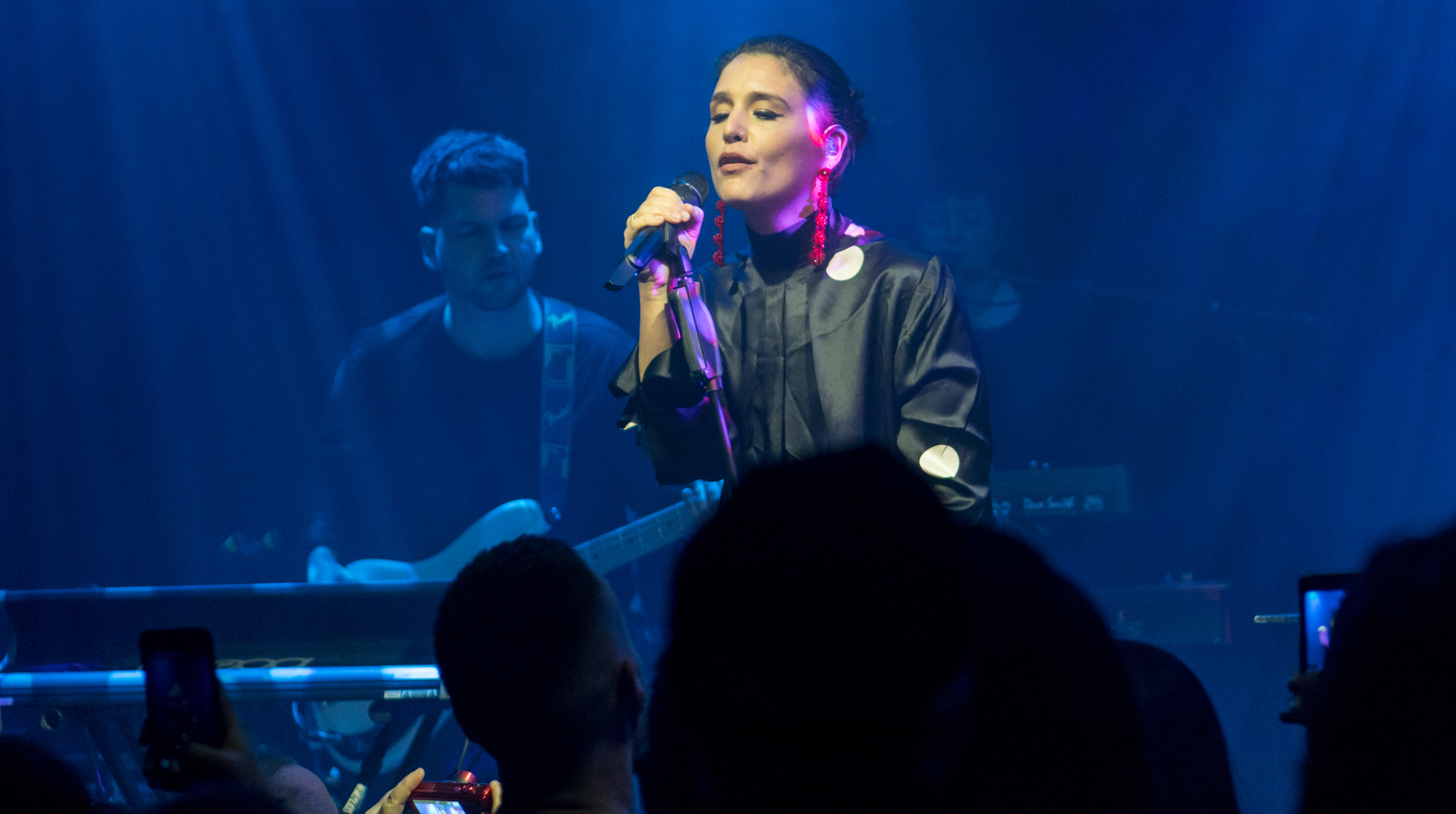
Ware performing at the Jazz Café in February 2018

In October 2017, Ware returned to the stage after a two-year absence in anticipation of the release of her third album, Glasshouse. Featuring contribution from Francis and the Lights, Ed Sheeran, Cashmere Cat, Julia Michaels and others, it was preceded by its first three singles "Midnight", "Selfish Love" and "Alone". Glasshouse debuted and peaked at number seven on the UK Albums Chart.

In October 2018, Ware released the single "Overtime", later to be included on What's Your Pleasure (The Platinum Pleasure Edition) in 2021.

=== 2020–2025: What's Your Pleasure? and That! Feels Good! ===
Ware's What's Your Pleasure? was released on 27 June 2020, after being pushed back from its initial release date of 5 June. The first single from the album, "Adore You", was released in February 2019. This was followed by "Mirage (Don't Stop)" in November, "Spotlight" in February 2020 and then "Ooh La La" in April, "Save a Kiss" in May and "What's Your Pleasure?" in July. The album was met with widespread critical acclaim. In April 2021, Ware announced an expanded edition of the album titled What's Your Pleasure? The Platinum Pleasure Edition with an 11 June release date, along with the release of the single "Please". The reissue features seven additional songs, including singles "Overtime", "Please", and "Hot N Heavy", and a remix of "Adore You", for a total of eight additional tracks.

Later in 2021, Ware collaborated with Kylie Minogue on the reissue of Minogue's fifteenth album, Disco, entitled Disco: Guest List Edition. Their song "Kiss of Life" was released on 29 October 2021. Their collaboration took place after Minogue appeared on Ware's podcast Table Manners in September 2020. In the episode, the pair spoke about writing together. Ware later joked that she had "bullied" Minogue into a duet as the two further discussed a collaboration.

"Free Yourself", the lead single from Ware's fifth album, That! Feels Good!, was released on 19 July 2022 following a premiere at that year's Glastonbury Festival. It was produced by Stuart Price. The album's second single, "Pearls", was released on 9 February 2023. She released the album on 28 April 2023.

=== 2026: Superbloom ===
On 23 January 2026, she released "I Could Get Used to This" as the lead single to her album Superbloom. The album was released on 17 April 2026.

== Other work ==
Towards the end of 2017, Ware launched a podcast, produced with her mother, called Table Manners for Acast and Island Records about "family, food and the art of a good old chit-chat", featuring a new guest each week on the show. The first episode became available on 8 November 2017 and featured British singer-songwriter and friend Sam Smith. The show has since entered its tenth season, including guests such as Ed Sheeran, Randy Jackson, Nigella Lawson, Sandi Toksvig, Daniel Kaluuya, Paloma Faith, George Ezra, Annie Mac, Paul McCartney and Kylie Minogue.

On 23 January 2019, Ware announced on her Instagram that she had created a premium kidswear collaboration called "Anyware Kids" launching online and in selected retailers Spring 2019, developed by designer George Reddings. The website officially went live on 31 March 2019.

In 2021, Ware appeared as a guest judge on the second series of RuPaul's Drag Race UK.

In May 2023, it was announced that Ware would be one of the judges for the ITV talent show Mamma Mia! I Have a Dream alongside Alan Carr, Samantha Barks and Amber Riley with Zoe Ball being the presenter. The show followed the search for two up-and-coming musical theatre performers to play the roles of Sophie and Sky in 'Mamma Mia!' in London's West End for its 25th anniversary year.

== Philanthropy ==
Ware is a UNICEF UK ambassador and travelled with them to Bangladesh, Cameroon and North Macedonia to see the work they are doing there to help children who have fled violence. On 15 November 2014, Ware joined the charity group Band Aid 30 along with other British and Irish pop acts, recording the latest version of the track "Do They Know It's Christmas?" at Sarm West Studios in Notting Hill, London, to raise money for the 2014 Ebola crisis in West Africa.

Ware was also part of the lineup for "Artists for Grenfell" charity single which was released to raise money for the families of the victims of the Grenfell Tower fire in June 2017 and for The London Community Foundation.

On May 29, 2025, Ware, alongside other British musical acts such as Dua Lipa and Massive Attack, signed a letter urging Prime Minister Keir Starmer to "end U.K. complicity" in the ongoing Israel-Palestine conflict.

== Personal life ==
In August 2014, Ware married her childhood friend, Sam Burrows. They have three children.

Ware is Jewish. In 2021, she discussed her plans to have a bat mitzvah as an adult.

== Discography ==
- Devotion (2012)
- Tough Love (2014)
- Glasshouse (2017)
- What's Your Pleasure? (2020)
- That! Feels Good! (2023)
- Superbloom (2026)

== Tours ==
- Devotion Tour (2012)
- Night + Day Tour (2013)
- Tough Love World Tour (2014)
- Glasshouse Tour (2018)
- What's Your Pleasure? Tour (2021–2022)
- That! Feels Good! Live! (2023)
- Superbloom Tour (2026)

== Awards and nominations ==
Ware has been nominated for several awards, including seven Brit Awards nominations, four of them being for British Female Solo Artist. Her albums Devotion and That! Feels Good! were also both shortlisted for the Mercury Prize for Album of the Year.
