= What's Your Pleasure? =

2020 album by Jessie Ware

- Standard edition cover. The Platinum Pleasure edition uses a silver tint.

Studio album by Jessie Ware
- Released: 26 June 2020
- Recorded: 2018–2020
- Studios: Ford (London); Konk (London) (Note: Guitars and drums on tracks 1–4 and 8); Snap! (London) (Note: Backing vocals on tracks 1–4, 7–9, 11 and 12); Abbey Road (London) (Note: Strings and brass)
- Genres: Disco; post-disco; funk; pop
- Length: 53:19
- Labels: PMR; EMI
- Producers: Benji B; Adam Bainbridge; James Ford; Morgan Geist; Joseph Mount; Matthew Tavares

Jessie Ware chronology
Glasshouse (2017)	What's Your Pleasure? (2020)	That! Feels Good! (2023)

Singles from What's Your Pleasure?
- 1. "Adore You" Released: 13 February 2019; 2. "Mirage (Don't Stop)" Released: 5 November 2019; 3. "Spotlight" Released: 28 February 2020; 4. "Ooh La La" Released: 24 April 2020; 5. "Save a Kiss" Released: 7 May 2020; 6. "What's Your Pleasure?" Released: 24 July 2020; 7. "Remember Where You Are" Released: 5 February 2021

What's Your Pleasure? is the fourth studio album by British singer-songwriter Jessie Ware, released on 26 June 2020 by PMR Records and Virgin EMI Records. Ware and co-producer James Ford co-wrote all tracks, along with writers and producers Benji B, Joseph Mount, Kindness, Morgan Geist, Matthew Tavares and Midland.

The album received widespread critical acclaim. It was also a commercial success, earning Ware her first top-three entry and, to date, her highest peak position on both the UK Albums Chart and Scottish Albums Chart. Five singles have been released to promote the album. In April 2021, What's Your Pleasure? was nominated for Album of the Year at the Brit Awards. A reissue subtitled The Platinum Pleasure Edition, was released on 11 June 2021 and preceded by the singles "Please" and "Hot n Heavy".

== Background ==
After the promotional cycle for her previous album Glasshouse, Ware felt pressured to quit music due to low album sales and her exhaustion with touring. However, Ware's podcast Table Manners gained a larger following of 13 million listeners and soon became Ware's main priority. Speaking to The Independent, Ware described the podcast's success as a "turning point" that changed her outlook of herself: "I suddenly felt more comfortable in my skin." With the podcast, Ware discusses more personal topics that she felt forced to publicise with her music.

Upon the announcement of the release of the album in February 2020, Ware described the album as a "two-year labour of love", further citing the album as her visions of "escapism [and] groove". The twelve tracks on What's Your Pleasure? move away from her usual "melancholy" sound in her previous releases, to focus on disco, hi-NRG, and house. With Ford co-producing the album, Ware intended to pay homage to what the duo called "wedding jams", along with the soul of late American singer-songwriter Minnie Riperton, and the New York underground disco scene.

== Release ==
What's Your Pleasure? was initially scheduled to be released on 5 June 2020; however, the date was moved to 19 June due to the COVID-19 pandemic. Ware then announced that she would be pushing the release date back another week so as not to conflict with Juneteenth. The album was released on 26 June 2020, making it her first major release since Glasshouse (2017), and subsequently her first release after giving birth to her second child. Music videos were released for the title track, "Soul Control", "Step into My Life", "In Your Eyes", and "The Kill".

The cover art for the record sees Ware sport red lipstick, a black shirt and a golden necklace, with Pitchfork calling it a "spitting image" of Polaroids taken by American artist Andy Warhol of former actress Bianca Jagger.

On 8 January 2021, Ware confirmed the forthcoming release of a deluxe edition of the album on Twitter. Just before the album's release, Ware announced that she would embark on the What's Your Pleasure? Tour, starting in April 2021. Ware promoted the album through virtual performances, aired by several television programmes, due to the COVID-19 pandemic.

What's Your Pleasure? features elements of disco, post-disco, funk, Italo disco, hi-NRG, rave, deep house, acid house, electro, new wave, trip hop, R&B, gospel, chamber folk, dream pop and soul.

On 11 June 2021, a reissue subtitled The Platinum Pleasure Edition was released, with an original cover art in greyscale with a metallic silver background. The lead single from this edition, "Please". The single "Overtime" released in 2018, was originally going to be part of the original album, but ended up being taken off the original tracklist and was re-released with a different mix.

== Critical reception ==
Professional ratings
Aggregate scores
Source	Rating
AnyDecentMusic?	8.2/10
Metacritic	84/100
Review scores
Source	Rating
AllMusic	5/5 stars
The Daily Telegraph	4/5 stars
The Guardian	4/5 stars
The Independent	4/5 stars
The Irish Times	5/5 stars
NME	4/5 stars
The Observer	4/5 stars
Pitchfork	8.3/10
Rolling Stone	4.5/5 stars
The Times	4/5 stars

What's Your Pleasure? received widespread critical acclaim. It was praised for its "disco-inspired" sound and cited as the singer's "finest" work. Ware earned praise for "going back to where she started" and for sounding "bolder, looser" compared to her previous releases. At Metacritic, which assigns a weighted average rating out of 100 to reviews from mainstream publications, the album received an average score of 84, based on 18 reviews, indicating "universal acclaim". Aggregator AnyDecentMusic? gave What's Your Pleasure? 8.2 out of 10, based on their assessment of the critical consensus.

Tara Joshi of The Guardian praised the upbeat nature of What's Your Pleasure? and compared it to other "grown-up disco" albums like Lady Gaga's Chromatica and Robyn's Honey. NME editor Hannah Mylrea claimed the album was a return to Ware's club roots, which she had strayed away from since her debut Devotion, and called it "an intoxicating cocktail of seductive beats, exhilarating choruses and sleek production." Owen Myers of Pitchfork complimented the album's musical references to disco divas of the past like Donna Summer, Diana Ross, and Anita Ward and awarded it the website's "Best New Music" distinction. Myers remarked positively on Ware's commitment to making uplifting music while allowing "a little of her signature psychodrama to creep into the nocturnal escapades she describes, and the flecks of ennui make the highs even higher."

Andy Kellman of AllMusic singled out "Mirage (Don't Stop)" as a highlight, praising the Bananarama-influenced production, as well as praising the production of the album as a whole. Kellman also praised the "chamber folk-soul" of the album's closer "Remember Where You Are", calling it a "stirring finale".

In July 2020, What's Your Pleasure? was included on Slant Magazine's list of the best albums of 2020 so far.

In February 2026, the album was included in Spotify's list of Classic Pop Albums of the Streaming Era (2015-present). The list is picked by editors that selected 30 albums that define the ambition, emotion, and cultural impact of modern pop.

=== Accolades ===
Accolades for What's Your Pleasure?
Publication	Accolade	Rank	Ref.
Beats Per Minute	BPM's Top 50 Best Albums of 2020	28	
Billboard	The Top 10 Best Dance Albums of 2020: Staff Picks	1	
Clash	Albums of the Year 2020	9	
Exclaim!	50 Best Albums of 2020	28	
Gigwise	51 Best Albums of 2020	12	
Gorilla vs. Bear	Albums of 2020	27	
The Guardian	The 50 Best Albums of 2020	14	
Idolator	The 70 Best Pop Albums of 2020	7	
The Line of Best Fit	The Best Albums of 2020 Ranked	35	
musicOMH	Top 50 Albums of 2020	9	
The Needle Drop	The 50 Best Albums of 2020	1	
Paste	The 50 Best Albums of 2020	39	
Pitchfork	The 50 Best Albums of 2020	9	
Rolling Stone	The 50 Best Albums of 2020	9	
The Skinny	Top 10 Albums of 2020	8	
Slant Magazine	The 50 Best Albums of 2020	3	
Slate	The Best Albums of 2020	3	
Stereogum	The 50 Best Albums of 2020	26	
Under the Radar	Top 100 Albums of 2020	5	
USA Today	The 10 best albums of 2020, ranked	3	

== Commercial performance ==
According to the Official Charts Company, What's Your Pleasure? was the most downloaded album over the weekend upon its initial release on 26 June 2020. The album eventually debuted at number three on both the UK Albums Chart and Scottish Albums Chart, giving Ware her fourth consecutive top-ten entry on the former and her first top-three entry on both. By this, the album became Ware's highest peak position on both charts, surpassing the number five peak and number twenty-six peak achieved by her debut album, Devotion (2012). The album is also Ware's first top-forty entry on the Belgian Albums (Ultratop Flanders) chart since Tough Love (2014), debuting at number thirty-six. It was also her first release to spend more than one week within the top ten of the UK Albums Chart, as it reached number seven upon its Platinum Pleasure re-release on 11 June 2021, nearly one year after its original release.

== Track listing ==
Standard edition
No.	Title	Writer(s)	Producer(s)	Length
1.	"Spotlight"	Jessie Ware; James Ford; Shungudzo Kuyimba; Daniel Parker	Ford	5:31
2.	"What's Your Pleasure?"	Ware; Ford; Kuyimba; Parker	Ford	4:38
3.	"Ooh La La"	Ware; Ford; Kuyimba; Parker	Ford	3:48
4.	"Soul Control"	Ware; Morgan Geist; Ford; Kuyimba; Parker	Ford; Geist	3:59
5.	"Save a Kiss"	Ware; Ford; Kuyimba; Parker	Ford; Midland^{[a]}	4:02
6.	"Adore You"	Ware; Joseph Mount	Mount	3:45
7.	"In Your Eyes"	Ware; Ford	Ford	4:58
8.	"Step into My Life"	Ware; Ford; Adam Bainbridge	Ford; Bainbridge	3:37
9.	"Read My Lips"	Ware; Ford	Ford	4:03
10.	"Mirage (Don't Stop)"	Ware; Benjamin Benstead; Clarence Coffee Jr.; Matthew Tavares; Ford; Thomas Hull; Keren Woodward; Sara Dallin; Siobhan Fahey; Steven Jolley; Anthony Swain	Benji B; Tavares; Ford	4:47
11.	"The Kill"	Ware; Ford; Coffee	Ford	4:37
12.	"Remember Where You Are"	Ware; Ford; Kuyimba; Parker	Ford	5:34
Total length:				53:19

The Platinum Pleasure Edition (disc two)
No.	Title	Writer(s)	Producer(s)	Length
1.	"Please"	Ware; Kuyimba; Parker; Ford	Ford	4:32
2.	"Impossible"	Ware; Coffee; Ford	Ford	3:42
3.	"Eyes Closed"	Ware; Kuyimba; Parker; Ford	Ford	4:26
4.	"Overtime"	Ware; Kuyimba; Parker; Ford; Andy Ferguson; Matthew McBriar	Ford; Bicep^{[a]}	4:39
5.	"Hot n Heavy"	Ware; Kuyimba; Parker; Samuel George Lewis	SG Lewis	3:35
6.	"Pale Blue Light"	Ware; Kuyimba; Parker; Ford	Ford	4:44
7.	"0208" (featuring Kindness)	Ware; Bainbridge	Kindness	4:03
8.	"Adore You" (Endless Remix) (with Bibi Zhou and Sihan)	Ware; Mount	Mount; Endless^{[a]}	3:44
Total length:				33:25

=== Notes ===
- ^{^[a]} signifies an additional producer
- The song "Mirage (Don't Stop)" contains elements of the song "Cruel Summer" performed by Bananarama.

== Personnel ==
Credits adapted from the liner notes of What's Your Pleasure?

=== Musicians ===
- Jessie Ware – vocals
- James Ford – keyboards, percussion, programming (tracks 1–5, 7, 9–12); synths (tracks 1–5, 7, 9, 11, 12); guitar, bass, drums (tracks 5, 7, 9, 11, 12)
- Dave Okumu – guitar (tracks 1–4, 8)
- Leo Taylor – drums (tracks 1–4, 8)
- Shungudzo – backing vocals (tracks 1–4, 12)
- Danny Parker – backing vocals (tracks 1–4, 12)
- Bim Amoako – backing vocals (tracks 1–4, 7–9, 11, 12)
- Senab Adekunle – backing vocals (tracks 1–4, 7–9, 11, 12)
- Morgan Geist – programming (track 4)
- Midland – synths, programming (track 5)
- Joseph Mount – keyboards, programming (track 6)
- Dante Hemingway – string and brass arrangements, programming (tracks 1–4, 6, 12)
- Adam Bainbridge – keyboards, programming (track 8)
- Clarence Coffee Jr. – backing vocals (tracks 10, 11)
- Jules Buckley – string and brass arrangements, conducting
- Tom Pigott-Smith (leader), Lizzie Ball, Marianne Haynes, Laura Melhuish, Kate Robinson, Charlie Brown, Nicky Sweeney, Jeremy Isaac, Hannah Dawson, Oli Langford – violins
- Vicci Wardman, Helen Kamminga, Reiad Chibah – violas
- Ian Burdge, Chris Worsey, Katherine Jenkinson – cellos
- Richard Pryce – double bass
- Richard Watkins, Nigel Black – French horns
- Tom Walsh, Louis Dowdeswell, Andy Wood – trumpets, flugelhorns
- Callum Au – tenor trombone
- Dave Stewart – bass trombone

=== Technical ===
- James Ford – mixing (all tracks), recording (tracks 1–5, 7–12)
- Joseph Mount – recording (track 6)
- Joe LaPorta – mastering
- Billy Foster – engineering assistance
- Matt Jaggar – engineering assistance
- Lewis Jones – string and brass recording
- George Oulton – engineering assistance

=== Artwork ===
- Mat Maitland – creative direction
- Dan Sanders – commission, creative
- Rory Dewar – artwork
- Carlijn Jacobs – photography
- Suzanne Beirne – set design

== Charts ==
Chart performance for What's Your Pleasure?
Chart (2020–2021)	Peak position
Belgian Albums (Ultratop Flanders)	36
Belgian Albums (Ultratop Wallonia)	136
Irish Albums (Official Charts)	28
Polish Albums (ZPAV)	17
Spain Albums Top 100 (PROMUSICAE)	29
Scottish Albums (Official Charts)	3
Swiss Albums (Schweizer Hitparade)	66
UK Albums (Official Charts)	3
US Top Album Sales (Billboard)	34

== Certifications ==
Certifications for What's Your Pleasure?
Region	Certification	Certified units/sales
Poland (ZPAV)	Gold	10,000^{‡}
United Kingdom (BPI)	Silver	60,000^{‡}
^{‡} Sales+streaming figures based on certification alone.

== Release history ==
Release dates and formats for What's Your Pleasure?
Region	Date	Format	Version	Label	Ref.
Various	26 June 2020	Cassette; CD; digital download; LP; streaming	Standard	PMR; Virgin EMI	
Various	11 June 2021	LP; CD; cassette; digital download; streaming	Platinum Pleasure edition	PMR; EMI	
