= Midland (DJ) =

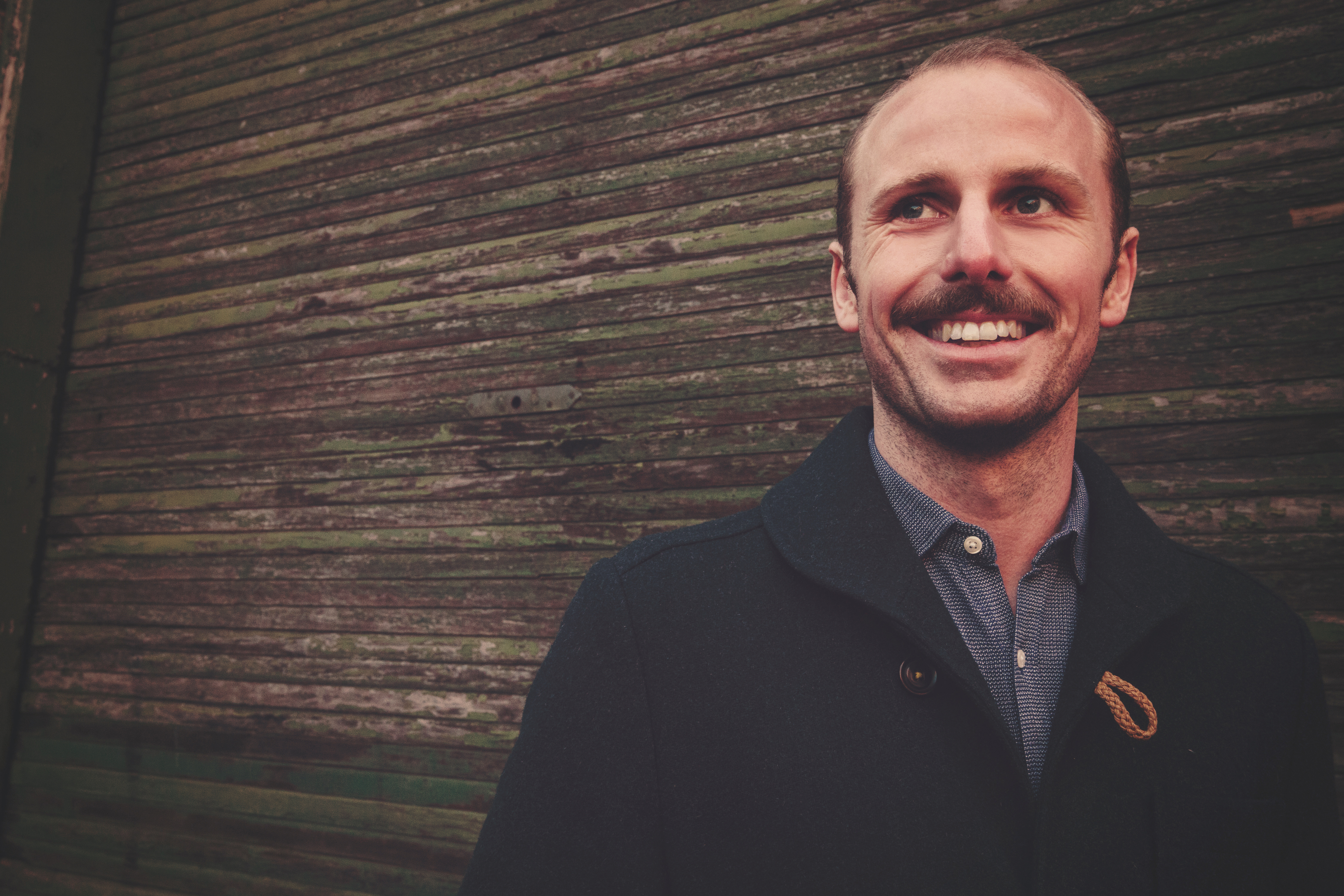

Background information
- Born: 23/09/86
- Genres: House; electronica; techno
- Occupations: DJ; record producer; record label owner
- Years active: 2003–present
- Website: www.facebook.com/midlanduk

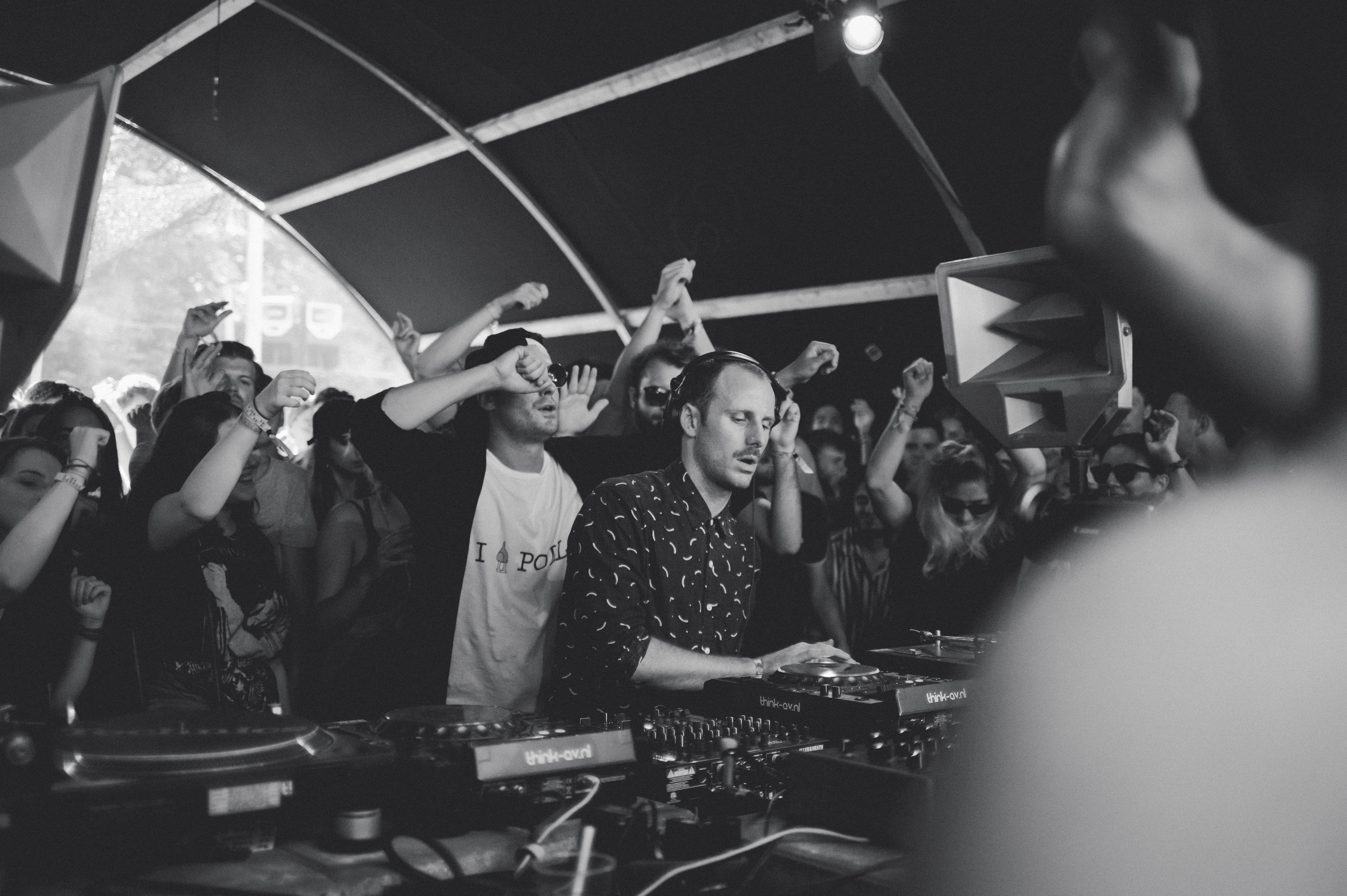
Midland at Dekmantel

Harry Agius (born 1986), known professionally as Midland, is a British DJ, producer and record label owner who began his career in Leeds and is now based in London. He founded his label Graded in 2013 as an output for his own productions.

== Biography ==
Real name Harry Agius, Midland grew up in Tanzania, where his father worked as an engineer, and Greece. He boarded at Downside School from the age of 13 in Somerset and later went to university in Leeds. In 2004, Agius heard a drum and bass mix tape of Andy C at Slammin' Vinyl, inspiring him to learn the craft of DJing. An avid drum and bass fan, he purchased his first set of Technics turntables and upon moving to Leeds was offered a graveyard slot on the Leeds' local Pirate radio station 'Radio Frequency' under his first moniker, Apt Pupil. He went on to play a nights such as Momentum, Metropolis and Subdub, playing on the Valve Soundsystem warming up for DJs such as Grooverider, Andy C and Dillinja.

After graduating and moving to Leeds, he connected with like-minded producers and DJs, including Pearson Sound, Ben UFO, and Pangaea, and regularly attended nights such as Exodus, Subdub, Louche, and Back to Basics. These experiences shifted his focus toward slower tempos, laying the foundation for the Midland alias. Since then, he has become known for his genre-fluid mixes, seamlessly blending left-field house, techno, rare disco, and distinctive UK sounds, leading to appearances alongside a wide range of artists on diverse lineups each weekend.

In 2013 he founded his label Graded in 2013 as an output for his own productions.

In 2015 founded the sub-label Regraded, the sister imprint focusing on sample led disco and house music releasing music from the likes of Gerd Janson, Shan, Hubie Davison and himself. His first release as Midland was a collaboration with Pearson Sound (then Ramadanman) back in 2010, 'Your Words Matter' on Fink and Will Saul's label Aus Music. He went on to release his 'Play The Game' EP on Phonica Records in the same year, 'Bring Joy' on More Music in 2011, an untitled techno EP with Pariah on Work The Long Nights in 2012. His track 'Trace' on Aus Music became somewhat of a breakthrough in 2013. Tracks such as Archive 01, Realtime and Drumtrak all followed on his Graded imprint. He has remixed artists such as Mano Le Tough, Darkstar, Lone and Julio Bashmore - and has been remixed by Grain, Leon Vynehall and Motor City Drum Ensemble. In 2018, he founded another sub-label entitled Intergraded, with a focus on emerging artists.

His 2016 track 'Final Credits' became Mixmag's 2016 'Song Of the Year'^{[4]}, and in 2016 he was awarded BBC Radio 1's Essential Mix of the Year^{[5]}^{[6]} for his 2-hour 2016 mix entry^{[7]}. He has recorded mixes for Fact Magazine, Beats In Space, XLR8R and Resident Advisor amongst others. In 2017 he was announced as the creator of Fabric's 94th instalment of their Fabriclive mix CD series (Fabriclive 94)^{[10]}^{[11]}^{[12]}^{[13]}^{[14]}, with a launch party in September 2017^{[15]}^{[16]}. The mix CD received positive reviews (8.0) from music editorials like Pitchfork^{[18]}, DJ Mag (9/10), XLR8R (8/10) ^{[19]}and Mixmag (8/10).

In 2018, Midland featured in Resident Advisor's 'Between The Beats' film series, which follows DJs on tour to explore life on the road.

As a touring DJ he's played at venues and parties around the world, including Fabric (London), Berghain/Panorama Bar (Berlin), Macarena Club (Barcelona), Concrete (Paris), Electric Pickle (Miami), Jaeger (Oslo), De School (Amsterdam), Le Sucre (Lyon), DC10 (Ibiza) and Pikes Hotel (Ibiza). He's played at a number of festivals including Glastonbury and Field Day (UK), Dekmantel and Lowlands (Netherlands), Let Them Eat Cake (Australia), Love International (Croatia), Montreaux Jazz Festival (Switzerland) and Rob Da Bank's Bestival (UK).

In January 2019, Midland was announced as the cover star of Mixmag magazine's February issue.

== Personal life ==
Midland is gay and uses his social media presence to raise awareness of issues affecting LGBT people. He lives with his husband, Mike, in South London.

== Notable Discography ==
Title	Label	Year
Ramadanman & Midland - Your Words Matter / More Than You Know	Aus Music	2010
Midland - Play The Game EP	Phonica Records	2010
Midland - Through Motion EP	Aus Music	2011
Midland - Bring Joy EP	More Music	2011
Midland - Placement EP	Aus Music	2012
Midland (Placement Remixes ft. Lone & Motor City Drum Ensemble)	Aus Music	2012
Midland & Breach - 101 / Somewhere EP	Naked Naked	2012
Midland & Pariah - Untitled EP	Work The Long Nights	2012
More Music Compilation Sampler (Midland Feature)	More Music	2012
Midland - Archive 01 / Realtime EP	Graded	2013
Trace EP	Aus Music	2013
Drumtrak EP	Graded	2013
Duster EP	Aus Music	2014
Before We Leave EP	Phonica White	2014
Trace / For (Yacht) Club Use Only (ft Leon Vynehall & Grain Remixes)	Aus Music	2014
Bicep & Midland - D-Mil EP	Feel My Bicep	2014
Double Feature EP	Regraded	2015
Youandewan / Midland - Bring Joy (Youandewan's Warehouse Dub)	Aus Music	2015
Blush EP	Graded	2016
Final Credits	Regraded	2016
Fabriclive94 CD	Fabriclive Series	2017
Fragments of Us	Graded	2024

== Notable Mixes & Features ==
Name	Source	Year	Accolades
FACT Mix 185	Fact Magazine	2010	
RA Podcast RA.396	Resident Advisor	2013	
RA: Mix of the Day: Midland	Resident Advisor	2016	RA Mix of The Day
Dekmantel Podcast 022	Dekmantel	2015	
BBC Radio 1 Essential Mix: Midland	BBC Radio 1	2016	Won: BBC Radio 1's Essential Mix of the Year 2016
Fabriclive94 CD	Fabric London	2017	8/10 DJ Mag Spain, 8/10 XLR8R, 8.0 Pitchfork, 8/10 Mixmag. Mixmag Compilation Of The Year 2017
RA: Midland: Between The Beats	Resident Advisor	2018	
Mixmag Cover Mix	Mixmag	2019	
