= Shungudzo =

Zimbabwean-American singer

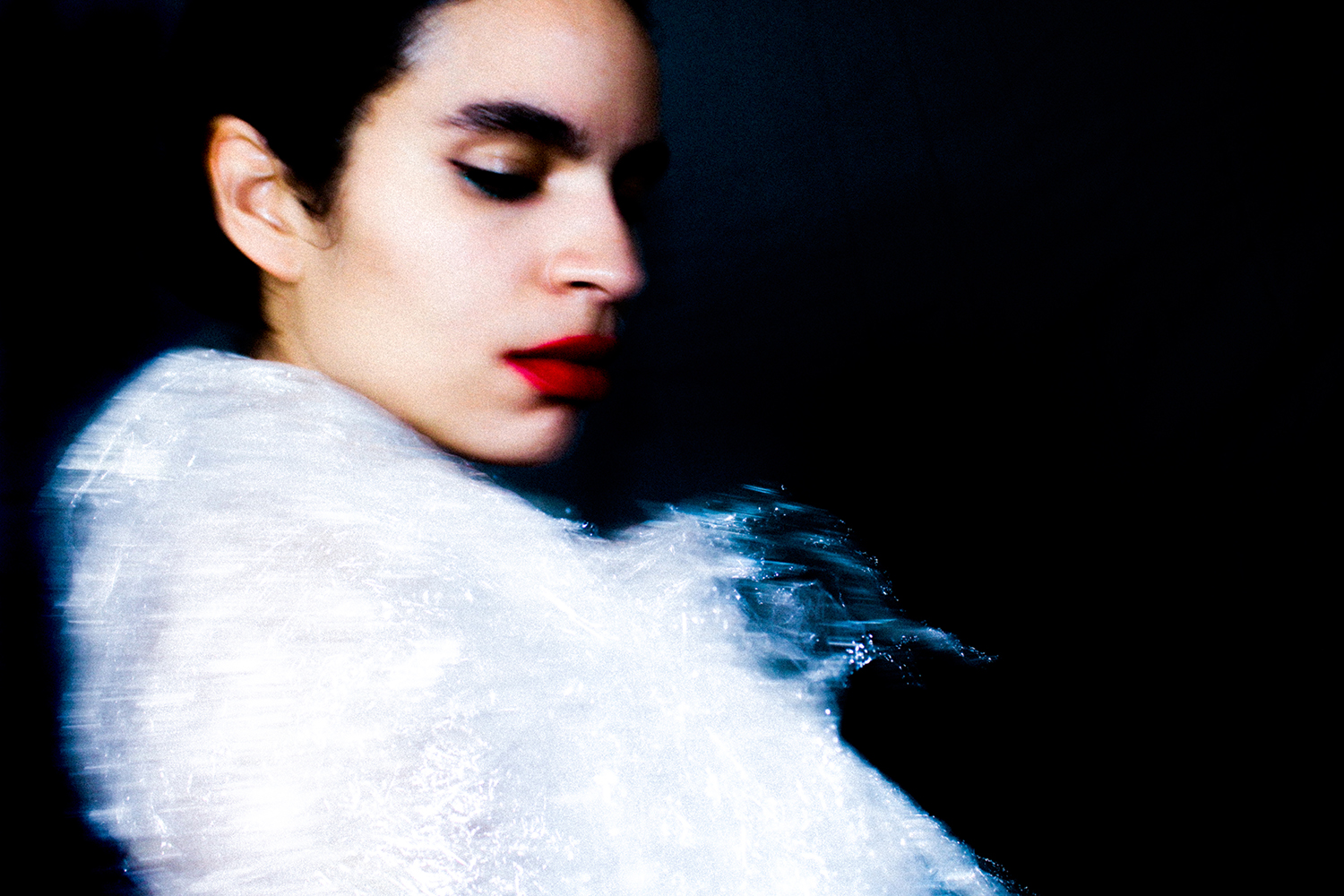

Background information
- Born: Alexandra Shungudzo Govere; May 12, 1987 (age 39); Laie, Hawaii, U.S.
- Origin: Bikita, Zimbabwe
- Genres: Pop, folk, rock, alternative
- Occupation: Singer
- Years active: 2010–present
- Label: Independent

Alexandra Shungudzo Govere, better known as Shungudzo, is a Zimbabwean-American singer and former reality television personality. She first attracted media attention by being the first black female gymnast to represent Zimbabwe in artistic gymnastics at the 1999 All-Africa Games, and later by co-founding the Kijana Project, which provides relief for AIDS orphans. She later gained wide media attention as a cast member on the 2011 season of The Real World: San Diego.

== Early life ==
Alexandra Govere was born in the United States and grew up in a rural village in Zimbabwe that was home to straw-covered mud huts, and did not have electricity or running water. She is of Zimbabwean, French, and Amerindian descent. As of the 1990’s, she was living in Oregon.

== Career ==
=== Ballet, gymnastics and education ===
Govere practiced dancing and ballet, and according to her, became the first female of color to be on the Zimbabwe National Gymnastics Team at age 9. Her parents, both of whom are college graduates, encouraged her in her studies as well. She studied calculus at age 10, and finished high school by 14. She later attended Stanford University, where she studied civil engineering.

Govere was the first black female artistic gymnast to represent Zimbabwe at the 1999 All-Africa Games in Johannesburg. She was also the youngest member of the 162-member team.

=== Charity work ===
In 1997, Govere began collecting clothing for orphans who lost their parents to AIDS. By 2002, the Kijana Project, as it came to be called, had expanded to an international organization run by then-15-year-old Govere and her sister Saunsuray, consisting of 50 members who aided orphans in six different countries, raising money for clothing, toys and school supplies, as well as paying for the education of some AIDS orphans. Govere was spurred to this work after witnessing many of her childhood classmates affected by AIDS, and seeing the rising number of orphans living on the streets of Harare. In 2000, she worked with her sister in collecting money for Red Cross flood relief in Mozambique. For breaking the color barrier in artistic gymnastics, and for her humanitarian work, Govere was designated a Disney-UNESCO Millennium Dreamers Ambassador.

=== Music and television ===
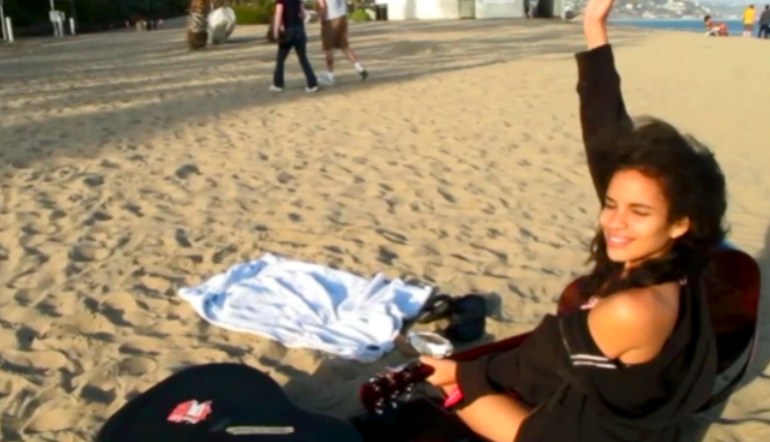
Shungudzo performing on a public beach in Malibu, California

While attending Stanford University, Govere was discovered by Alicia Keys' Grammy Award-winning producer, Kerry "Krucial" Brothers, who had heard some songs Govere placed on MySpace for her mother to hear. Although she initially met with Brothers with the intent to be a songwriter, he made her sing vocals, and recognized her talent. With him, she released a mixtape, "Love is 4 Suckaz/I'm a Sucka 4 Love", some songs from which are available on YouTube. Brass magazine describes the mixtape as "a high-wattage soup of synthetic beats and heavy post-production mixing", whose lyrics focus on the themes of love, jealousy, revenge and anti-consumerism. Describing Govere's voice, Brandon Goldner of Brass says, "[Her voice] can range from bright and flute-like to a rougher, almost smoky honesty" Although Govere planned to debut a 2011 album with Krucial, She announced in October 2011 that she left Krucial to take the independent route. She has co-written a number of hit songs such as Little Mix's "Touch" and Louisa Johnson's "Best Behaviour", and has released a song on the Fifty Shades Freed soundtrack. In 2018, she released her latest single, "Paper".

Govere was a cast member on MTV's The Real World: San Diego, which aired in 2011. Govere was also a writer, host, and correspondent for both MTV Act and MTV Voices.

=== "I'm not a mother, but I have children" ===
Shungudzo released "It's a good day (to fight the system)", the first single from her debut album by Svikiro Records/Young Forever/BMG on October 30, 2020, as part of her three-track manifesto "I (motsi)". According to American Songwriter, "good day" is "a bold genre-defying anthem that balances passionate proclamations with sunny guitar and horn arrangements and stacked harmonies." Shungudzo followed up "good day" with the singles "To be me", which premiered on Paper video on February 2, 2021;) "There's only so much a soul can take" (song premiere on Zane Lowe's Apple Music 1 radio show and video premiere on FLOOD), "White parents" (premiere on Consequence of Sound on April 14, 2021), and the title track "I'm not a mother, but I have children." For "it's a good day" and "There's only so much a soul can take", Shungudzo was recognized as an "emerging artist to watch for in 2021" by People. Hailed by Zane Lowe as "completely unique and individual" and as an artist to "match up with asap" by Essence, "Shungudzo isn't putting up with the bullshit anymore" (Refinery29).

Shungudzo performed "There's only so much a soul can take" on the June 9, 2021, episode of Full Frontal with Samantha Bee.

== Personal life ==
As of 2011, Govere was living in Los Angeles with her boyfriend, Byron, whom she began seeing eight months prior to filming The Real World. Their relationship was depicted in episode 4 of that season when he visited her at the season residence.

== Discography ==
=== Albums ===
Title	Year
"I'm not a mother, but I have children"	2021

=== Singles ===
==== As lead artist ====
Title	Year	Peak chart positions	Album
Title	Year	US AAA	Album
"Long Live the Billionaire"	2017	—	Non-album singles
"Paper"	2018	—	Non-album singles
"Freedom for my People" (with Oliver Heldens)	2020	—	Non-album singles
"It's a good day (to fight the system)"	2020	39	I'm not a mother, but I have children
"To be me"	2021	—	I'm not a mother, but I have children
"There's only so much a soul can take"	2021	—	I'm not a mother, but I have children
"White parents"	2021	—	I'm not a mother, but I have children
"I'm not a mother, but I have children"	2021	—	I'm not a mother, but I have children
"—" denotes a recording that did not chart or was not released in that territory.

==== As featured artist ====
Title	Year	Album
"Roll with Me" (Bantu featuring Shungudzo)	2017	Non-album single
"Bicycle" (BC Unidos featuring Shungudzo)	2017	Bicycle EP
"Spare Gold" (Paul White featuring Shungudzo)	2018	Rejuvenate
"Just a Little" (Bantu featuring Shungudzo)	2018	TBA
"Toast to Our Differences" (Rudimental featuring Shungudzo, Protoje and Hak Baker)	2018	Toast to Our Differences
"Roll with Me" (Bantu and Jonas Blue featuring Shungudzo and ZieZie)	2018	TBA
"Ice Cream Man" (Paul White featuring Shungudzo)	2018	Rejuvenate
"Fire in My Soul" (Oliver Heldens featuring Shungudzo)	2018	Non-album single
"Weightless" (Hayden James featuring Shungudzo)	2019	Between Us
"Back to Life" (Chiiild featuring Shungudzo)	2019	Synthetic Soul
"How Could I Ever?" (KUU featuring Shungudzo)	2020	Non-album single
"We'll Always Have This Dance " (KUU featuring Shungudzo)	2020	Non-album single
"How Could I Ever?" (KUU featuring Shungudzo)	2021	Non-album single
"Gimme Your Love " (KUU featuring Shungudzo)	2021	Non-album single
"Choose Love" (Angélique Kidjo featuring Shungudzo)	2021	Mother Nature
"Meant for Me " (Angélique Kidjo featuring Shungudzo)	2021	Mother Nature

=== Guest appearances ===
List of non-single guest appearances, with other performing artists, showing year released and album name
Title	Year	Other artist(s)	Album
"Complicated"	2017	Bantu	Africa for the Summer EP
"Ougadougou"	2017	BC Unidos	Bicycle EP
"Come on Back"	2018	Shungudzo	Fifty Shades Freed: Original Motion Picture Soundtrack

=== Songwriting credits ===
Title	Year	Artist(s)	Album	Written with
"Touch"	2016	Little Mix	Glory Days	Hanni Ibrahim, Patrick Patrikios, Philip Plested
"Not That Girl"	2017	Girli	Feel Ok EP	Milly Toomey
"Best Behaviour"	2017	Louisa	Non-album single	Thomas Barnes, Peter Kelleher, Benjamin Kohn, Daniel Parker
"It Won't Kill Ya" (featuring Louane)	2017	The Chainsmokers	Memories...Do Not Open	Andrew Taggart, Samuel Martin
"Stay Awake, Wait for Me"	2017	Jessie Ware	Glasshouse	Jessica Ware, Ajay Bhattacharya, Daniel Parker
"Your Domino"	2017	Jessie Ware	Glasshouse	Jessica Ware, Ajay Bhattacharya, Daniel Parker, Daniel Sinclair
"Love to Love"	2017	Jessie Ware	Glasshouse	Jessica Ware, Ajay Bhattacharya, Daniel Parker
"Wish I Never Met You"	2018	Victoria Monét	Life After Love, Pt 1	Victoria McCants, Maurice "Verse" Simmonds
"Way Down"	2018	MØ	Forever Neverland	Karen Marie Ørsted, Ajay Bhattacharya, Letter Mbulu, Caiphus Semenya
"Overtime"	2018	Jessie Ware	Non-album single	Jessica Ware, Daniel Parker, James Ford, Andy Ferguson, Matthew McBriar
"Joan of Arc"	2018	Little Mix	LM5	Leigh-Anne Pinnock, Jade Thirlwall, Hanni Ibrahim, Patrick Patrikios, Philip Plested
"Wasabi"	2018	Little Mix	LM5	Jade Thirlwall, Uzoechi Emenike, Mike Sabath
"Notice"	2018	Little Mix	LM5	Leigh-Anne Pinnock, Jade Thirlwall, Mike Sabath
"Forevermore"	2019	Yuna	Rouge	Yuna Zara'ai, Robin Hannibal
"(Not) The Love of My Life"	2019	Yuna	Rouge	Yuna Zara'ai, Robin Hannibal
"Forget About You"	2019	Yuna	Rouge	Yuna Zara'ai, Robin Hannibal
"Back to Life"	2019	Chiiild	Synthetic Soul	Yonatan Ayal, Pierre-Luc Rioux, Isabelle Dunn
"Hands Off Me"	2020	Chiiild	Synthetic Soul	Yonatan Ayal, Pierre-Luc Rioux, Isabelle Dunn, Lauren Malyon
"Do Me Wrong"	2020	ASL	Love Center	Liza Owen, John Ryan II, Julian Bunetta, Andrew Haas, Ian Franzino
"Elevate"	2020	ASL	Love Center	Liza Owen, John Ryan II, Julian Bunetta, Andrew Haas, Ian Franzino
"Bite the Pillow"	2020	ASL	Love Center	Liza Owen, John Ryan II, Julian Bunetta, Andrew Haas, Ian Franzino
"Night Owl"	2020	ASL	Love Center	Liza Owen, John Ryan II, Julian Bunetta, Andrew Haas, Ian Franzino
"Boys Can Swim"	2020	ASL	Love Center	Liza Owen, John Ryan II, Julian Bunetta, Andrew Haas, Ian Franzino
"Spotlight"	2020	Jessie Ware	What's Your Pleasure?	Jessica Ware, Daniel Parker, James Ford
"What's Your Pleasure?"	2020	Jessie Ware	What's Your Pleasure?	Jessica Ware, Daniel Parker, James Ford
"Ooh La La"	2020	Jessie Ware	What's Your Pleasure?	Jessica Ware, Daniel Parker, James Ford,
"Soul Control"	2020	Jessie Ware	What's Your Pleasure?	Jessica Ware, Daniel Parker, James Ford, Morgan Geist
"Save a Kiss"	2020	Jessie Ware	What's Your Pleasure?	Jessica Ware, Daniel Parker, James Ford
"Remember Who You Are"	2020	Jessie Ware	What's Your Pleasure?	Jessica Ware, Daniel Parker, James Ford
"Kiss of Life"	2021	Kylie Minogue and Jessie Ware	Disco: Guest List Edition	Kylie Minogue, Jessica Ware, James Ford, Danny Parker
