= Louis Dowdeswell =

English jazz trumpeter (born 1993)

- Born: November 22, 1993 (age 32); Portishead, Somerset, England
- Genre: Jazz
- Occupations: Musician, producer
- Instruments: Trumpet, flugelhorn
- Website: louisdowdeswell.com

Louis Dowdeswell is an English jazz trumpeter. He is known for his ability in the upper register of the instrument.

== Career ==
Dowdeswell played lead trumpet with the National Youth Jazz Orchestra from 2012 to 2014. He graduated from the Royal Academy of Music in 2016.

Throughout his career, Dowdeswell has performed with Jamie Cullum, Al Jarreau, Michael Bublé, Peter Andre, Josh Groban and Alfie Bowe.

He formed the Louis Dowdeswell Big Band, in which he collaborated with fellow trumpeter Wayne Bergeron and trombonist Callum Au. They arranged a series of movie and TV series soundtracks (including Game of Thrones, The Incredible Suite, and Let it Go) for jazz band. He has played soundtracks for movies, including No Time to Die.

Dowdeswell and Cory Band's performance at the European Brass Band Championship were nominated for 2022 Newcomer of the Year by 2022 4BR Awards.

== Equipment ==
Louis plays Bach 17043GYR and 18043G Trumpets.
