= Anemoia (album) =

Studio album by SG Lewis
- Released: 5 September 2025
- Length: 40:58
- Labels: Forever Days; Positiva
- Producers: SG Lewis; London Grammar; J Moon; Totally Enormous Extinct Dinosaurs; Julian Bunetta

SG Lewis chronology
Heat (2024)	Anemoia (2025)

Singles from Anemoia
- 1. "Back of My Mind" Released: 16 May 2025; 2. "Sugar" Released: 11 July 2025; 3. "Feelings Gone" Released: 22 August 2025

Anemoia is the third studio album by English singer-songwriter, and record producer, SG Lewis. It was released on 5 September 2025, through the record label Positiva, and Lewis' own record label, Forever Days Records.

The ten-track album includes appearances from London Grammar, Totally Enormous Extinct Dinosaurs, RAHH, Shygirl, Frances and Oliver Sim.

== Background and promotion ==
On June 18, Lewis announced his third studio album Anemoia, alongside the album details, his upcoming tour to promote the album, with a statement on his social medias describing the project:

"I have always felt connected musically to periods of time gone by - whether it be 70’s New York, 90’s Ibiza or the acid house explosion. Times where music and culture have collided in ways so massive, it left the world changed forever. Like so many of us, I’ve always dreamt about what it might have been like to live through those times. Anemoia is the aural projection of that dream. The feelings of nostalgia I have for all these different times and places, boiled down into my fantasy sound track for a hypothetical dance floor. I want this album to accompany the moments of today, so that one day people might look back and feel Anemoia about what we experience right now."

— SG Lewis explaining his artistic vision behind Anemoia, via Instagram

To promote the album release, three tracks served as official singles: "Back Of My Mind" served as the album lead single, and was released on May 16. The second single "Sugar" in collaboration with British singer and DJ, Shygirl was released on July 11. A collaboration with British indie-pop band London Grammar titled, "Feelings Gone", was released as the album third single on August 22.

== Track listing ==
Anemoia tracklist
No.	Title	Writer(s)	Producer(s)	Length
1.	"Memory"	Samuel George Lewis; Reuben James	Lewis	4:46
2.	"Feelings Gone" (featuring London Grammar)	Lewis; Dot Major; Jay Mooncie; Hannah Reid; Dan Rothman	Lewis; London Grammar; J Moon	4:58
3.	"Sugar" (featuring Shygirl)	Lewis; Orlando Higginbottom; Blane Muise	Lewis; TEED	3:04
4.	"Transition" (featuring Rahh)	Lewis; Sam Knowles; Holly Quin-Ankrah	Lewis; Karma Kid	3:19
5.	"Devotion" (featuring TEED)	Lewis; Higginbottom	Lewis; TEED	3:38
6.	"Past Life"	Lewis; James	Lewis	3:15
7.	"Back of My Mind"	Lewis; Julian Bunetta; Ed Drewett; Higginbottom	Lewis; TEED; Bunetta	4:26
8.	"Another Place" (featuring Frances)	Lewis; Sophie Cooke	Lewis	3:36
9.	"Fallen Apart"	Lewis; Higginbottom	Lewis; TEED	5:50
10.	"Baby Blue" (featuring Oliver Sim)	Lewis; Knowles; Oliver Sim	Lewis; Karma Kid	4:02
Total length:				40:58

== Personnel ==
Credits adapted from Tidal.

- SG Lewis – music production
- Stuart Hawkes – mastering (tracks 1–6, 8–10)
- Nathan Boddy – mixing (1, 2, 4–6, 8, 10)
- London Grammar – vocals (2)
- Shygirl – vocals (3)
- Mark Ralph – mixing (3)
- Rahh – vocals (4)
- TEED – music production (5)
- Cassian Stewart-Kasimba – mixing (7, 9)
- Dale Becker – mastering (7)
- Katie Harvey – mastering assistance (7)
- Nate Mingo – mastering assistance (7)
- Noah McCorkle – mastering assistance (7)
- Frances – vocals (8)

== Charts ==
Chart performance for Anemoia
Chart (2025)	Peak position
UK Album Downloads (Official Charts)	81
UK Dance Albums (Official Charts)	2

== Release history ==
Anemoia release history
Region	Date	Format(s)	Label	Ref.
Various	5 September 2025	Vinyl; digital download; streaming	Forever Days; Positiva Records; UMG	
