= I'm Your Girl Right? =

- Fcukers remix cover

Single by Tove Lo

from the album Estrus
- Released: May 13, 2026
- Genre: Electropop
- Length: 2:49
- Label: Pretty Swede
- Songwriters: Tove Lo; Ludvig Söderberg
- Producer: A Strut

Tove Lo singles chronology
"Cave" (2024)	"I'm Your Girl Right?" (2026)	"Des fleurs" (2026)

Music video
- "I'm Your Girl Right?" on YouTube

"I'm Your Girl Right?" is a song by Swedish singer and songwriter Tove Lo, released on May 13, 2026 through her independent label Pretty Swede Records, as the lead single from her sixth studio album Estrus (2026).

== Composition and release ==
Described by music publications as an electro-pop track, "I’m Your Girl Right?" explores romantic uncertainty and a desire for reassurance from a partner. The song was written by Tove Lo and Ludvig Söderberg, while the production was handled by A Strut, with Shellback contributing drums. It was announced alongside Tove Lo's sixth studio album Estrus in May 2026. The song marked Lo's return with a new solo single following her 2024 collaborative project Heat with SG Lewis, and her collaboration with Australian house music producer Dom Dolla in the single "Cave".

== Music video ==
A music video for "I'm Your Girl Right?" directed by Nogari and produced by Iconoclast was released along with the single. It was filmed at a former monastery outside São Paulo, Brazil, with 70 dancers.

== Personnel ==
Credits adapted from Tidal.

- Tove Lo – vocals, songwriter, background vocals, executive producer, composer, lyricist
- Ludvig Söderberg – executive producer, songwriter, composer, lyricist
- A Strut – producer, programmer, keyboards, drums, bass
- Shellback – drums
- Johan Malmberg Hector – guitar
- Alex Ghenea – mixing engineer
- Jack Normile – assistant mixing engineer
- Randy Merrill – mastering engineer
- Jeremy Lertola – recording engineer
- Julius Petersson – A&R

== Track listing ==
I'm Your Girl Right? – Single

1. "I'm Your Girl Right?" – 2:49

I'm Your Girl Right? (Fcukers remix) – Single

1. "I'm Your Girl Right?" (Fcukers remix) – 5:43
2. "I'm Your Girl Right?" – 2:49

== Charts ==
Chart performance
Chart (2026)	Peak position
Estonia Airplay (TopHit)	94
Lithuania Airplay (TopHit)	161
New Zealand Hot Singles (RMNZ)	36

== Release history ==
Release dates and formats for "I'm Your Girl Right?"
Region	Date	Format(s)	Label	Version	Ref.
Various	May 13, 2026	Digital download; streaming	Pretty Swede	Original	
Various	June 5, 2026	Digital download; streaming	Pretty Swede	Fcukers Remix	
