= Forevher =

2019 album by Shura

Studio album by Shura
- Released: 16 August 2019
- Studio: Hush Hush Studios (London); RAK Studios (London)
- Genre: Electropop; pop; R&B; synth-pop
- Length: 44:00
- Label: Secretly Canadian
- Producer: Shura; Joel Pott

Shura chronology
Nothing's Real (2016)	Forevher (2019)	I Got Too Sad for My Friends (2025)

Singles from Forevher
- 1. "Bklynldn" Released: 11 March 2019; 2. "Religion (u can lay your hands on me)" Released: 12 June 2019; 3. "The Stage" Released: 15 July 2019

Forevher (stylized in lowercase) is the second studio album by the English musician Shura. It was released on 16 August 2019 by American independent record label Secretly Canadian. The album follows Shura's critically acclaimed debut album, Nothing's Real (2016). The album artwork of Forevher is a reference to the 1882 marble sculpture The Kiss, by French sculptor Auguste Rodin.

The album was preceded by three singles: "Bklynldn", "Religion (U Can Lay Your Hands on Me)" and "The Stage". "Religion" was supported by a music video; directed by Chloe Wallace.

A deluxe edition of the album was released on 26 March 2021, which contained three new tracks, one demo previously released on Bandcamp in 2020 and five acoustic versions of songs that appeared on the standard edition. A music video was released on 17 February 2021 to accompany one of the deluxe tracks "Obsession".

== Composition ==
Forevher has been described as spacey, super-melodic, immaculately produced pop. It is primarily an electropop and pop record featuring elements of R&B, funk, psychedelic pop, and soul, particularly "mid-’80s US soul and R&B".

== Critical reception ==
Forevher received critical acclaim from music critics. At Metacritic, the album received an average score of 83, based on 15 reviews. Aimee Cliff of Pitchfork stated that Forevher is "looser, livelier and more ecstatic than her debut, detailing the headlong rush of falling in love"; whilst also noting "string flutters mimicking skipped heartbeats, and basslines settling into deep, well-worn grooves." Callum Bains of PopMatters viewed Forevher as an "enjoyably varied album of catchy dance songs, summer jams, and introspective ballads." John Murphy of musicOMH described the sound of the album as "laid-back funk", concluding that the album "is the sound of a woman happy, in love, and going from strength to strength as a songwriter". Writing for NME, El Hunt comments that the record "queers up and skewers the traditional love song, beautifully articulating the giddiness of romance", adding that it "has the feel of a wonkily altered classic, drifting from warm blue pop that colours the sleeve, to quieter interludes." Sophia Simon-Bashall of The Line of Best Fit remarked that the record is "equally insular and nostalgic", adding that the content "feels like an endless dreamscape". They conclude that "Shura has created something hopeful and delightfully light" in Forevher, "setting it apart from much of pop's current offerings."

=== Accolades ===
Publication	Accolade	Rank	Ref.
The Independent	The 50 Best Albums Of 2019	29	
The Line of Best Fit	The Best Albums of 2019 Ranked	32	
Albumism	The 50 Best Albums of 2019	37	
Rough Trade	Albums Of The Year - 2019	50	

Professional ratings
Aggregate scores
Source	Rating
AnyDecentMusic?	7.7/10
Metacritic	83/100
Review scores
Source	Rating
Albumism	4/5 stars
AllMusic	4/5 stars
Clash	8/10
DIY	3.5/5 stars
The Line of Best Fit	9/10
Loud and Quiet	7/10
NME	4/5 stars
Pitchfork	7.8/10
The Skinny	4/5 stars
Sputnikmusic	4.3/5

== Track listing ==
- All tracks produced by Shura and Joel Pott.
- All track titles are stylized in all lowercase, except track 5, whose title is stylized in all uppercase.

No.	Title	Writer(s)	Length
1.	"That's Me, Just a Sweet Melody"	Aleksandra Lilah Denton; William Philips	1:12
2.	"Side Effects"	Denton; Joel Laslett Pott	4:14
3.	"Religion (U Can Lay Your Hands on Me)"	Denton; Pott; Luke Saunders	4:07
4.	"The Stage"	Denton; Pott; Orlando Higginbottom	4:37
5.	"Bklynldn"	Denton; Pott	4:01
6.	"Tommy"	Denton; Higginbottom	4:16
7.	"Princess Leia"	Denton; Jono Ma; Saunders	3:43
8.	"Flyin'"	Denton; Pott	3:37
9.	"Forever"	Denton; Pott	3:56
10.	"Control"	Denton; Pott	5:00
11.	"Skyline, Be Mine"	Denton; Pott	5:17
Total length:			44:00

Forevher – Deluxe edition (bonus tracks)
No.	Title	Writer(s)	Length
1.	"magazine launch - demo"	Pott; Denton	0:58
2.	"elevator girl ft. Ivy Sole"	Ivy Sole; Denton	3:26
3.	"obsession"	Denton; Jennifer Decilveo; Rosie Lowe	3:31
4.	"t-shirt"	Higginbottom; Denton	3:46
5.	"side effects - acoustic"	Denton; Pott	3:58
6.	"religion (u can lay your hands on me) - acoustic"	Denton; Pott; Saunders	4:25
7.	"the stage - acoustic"	Denton; Pott; Higginbottom	4:42
8.	"Bklynldn - acoustic"	Denton; Pott	3:26
9.	"forever - acoustic"	Denton; Pott	3:43
Total length:			75:50

== Personnel ==
Credits are adapted from the liner notes of Forevher.

=== Musicians ===
- Shura – synthesizers (track 5); programming (tracks 1, 5, 8); vocals (all tracks); piano (tracks 1, 5, 10); guitar (track 6); percussion (tracks 3, 4, 10, 11)
- Joel Laslett Pott – guitar (tracks 2–11); synthesizers (tracks 2–11); programming (all tracks); backing vocals (tracks 2, 4, 5, 7, 9); percussion (tracks 2–5, 8–11); piano (tracks 1, 2, 5, 8, 9); synth bass (tracks 4, 6, 7); Mellotron (tracks 2, 4, 10); Wurlitzer (track 7)
- Luke Saunders – synthesizers (tracks 3, 11); guitar (tracks 3, 4, 11); backing vocals (tracks 4, 5)
- Liam Hutton – drums (tracks 2–5, 8–11)
- Axel Ekermann – bass (tracks 2–5, 8–11)
- Rosie Lowe – backing vocals (tracks 2, 5–9)
- Kerry Leatham – backing vocals (tracks 2, 5, 6, 8, 9)
- Reva Gauntlett – backing vocals (tracks 2, 5, 6, 8)
- Pauline Le Mell – backing vocals (tracks 5, 8)
- Daniel Moyer – programming (track 3)
- Peter Gordon – saxophone (tracks 5, 8)
- Jonny Pilcher – strings arrangement (tracks 5, 8); piano (track 6)
- Will Miller – trumpet and horns arrangement (track 6)
- Jono Ma – synthesizers, percussion (track 11)
- Orlando Higginbottom – piano (track 4)

=== Technical ===
- Shura – production
- Joel Laslett Pott – production, recording engineering
- Daniel Moyer – recording engineering
- Jono Ma – recording engineering, additional production (track 11)
- Tom Archer – production assistance (tracks 2, 3, 5–10)
- Jamie McEvoy – production assistance (track 10)
- Marta Salogni – mixing
- Heba Kadry – mastering
- Nathanael Graham – assistance (tape recording) (track 6)

=== Artwork ===
- Hollie Fernando – photography
- Ellen Blocksidge – modelling
- Milly Cope – modelling
- Katie Evans – printing
- Miles Johnson – design

== Charts ==
Chart (2019)	Peak position
Scottish Albums (OCC)	32
UK Albums (OCC)	61
UK Album Downloads (OCC)	48
UK Independent Albums (OCC)	5
US Independent Albums (Billboard)	44
US Heatseekers Albums (Billboard)	19
