= DNH =

DNH may refer to:

- Dadra and Nagar Haveli, former union territory of India
- Dadra and Nagar Haveli and Daman and Diu, a union territory of India (formed from the merger of the above and Daman and Diu), postal code DNH
- Dunhuang Airport, IATA code DNH
- United States District Court for the District of New Hampshire
- Dike–New Hartford Community School District
- "DNH", a song by Tove Lo on Estrus, 2026
