= Flames (SG Lewis song) =

Single by SG Lewis featuring Ruel

from the EP Dawn
- Released: 10 May 2019
- Length: 3:36
- Label: PMR/Virgin EMI
- Songwriter(s): Samuel Lewis; Sophie Cooke; Alexander Oriet; David Phelan
- Producer(s): SG Lewis

SG Lewis singles chronology
"Throwaway" (2019)	"Flames" (2019)	"Chemicals" (2020)

Music video
- "Flames" on YouTube

"Flames" is a song recorded by British singer-songwriter SG Lewis featuring Australian singer-songwriter Ruel. It was released on 10 May 2019, as the third and final single from his Lewis's fifth extended play Dawn.

== Background and promotion ==
In a press release, Lewis said "I was put on to Ruel's music about 18 months ago, and watching his growth since then has been amazing. He's got such soul to his voice for someone of his age, it's crazy."

The music video for "Flames" was released on 30 May 2019.

== Reception ==
Kat Bein from Billboard said "'Flames' is smooth and funky, with a slow-jam melody that wafts over a menacing, '80s-style synth rhythm. There are bright moments of almost hymnal quality at the pre-chorus, but the fiery elements lick back up the sides to slow burn the vibe.

Juliette Stuart from Coup de Main Magazine said "The track is chill yet remains upbeat and maiden with synths it manages to be funky yet calm."

Alissa Arunarsirakul from Ones to Watch called the song "electrifying" saying "'Flames' incorporates Ruel's tender vocals and Lewis' warm electronics that remind us of peaceful sunrises after a night of good fun and treasured memories."

== Track listing ==
Digital download

1. "Flames" – 3:33

Digital download

1. "Flames" (Lastlings remix) – 4:18

== Charts ==
Chart performance for "Flames"
Chart (2019)	Peak position
New Zealand Hot Singles (RMNZ)	35

== Release history ==
Country	Date	Format	Label	Version
Various	10 May 2019	Digital download, streaming	PMR / Virgin EMI	original
United States	21 June 2019	Digital download, streaming	Jasmine Music	original
Various	9 August 2019	Digital download, streaming	PMR / Virgin EMI	Lastlings Remix
