= Des fleurs =

Single by Tove Lo and Stromae

from the album Estrus
- Released: June, 12, 2026
- Studio: House Mouse Studios (Stockholm, Sweden); Mosaert Label (Brussels, Belgium)
- Genre: Electropop
- Length: 2:52
- Label: Pretty Swede
- Songwriters: Tove Lo; Paul van Haver
- Producers: Stromae; Oscar Holter

Tove Lo singles chronology
"I'm Your Girl Right?" (2026)	"Des fleurs" (2026)	"DNH" (2026)

"Des fleurs" is a song by Swedish singer and songwriter Tove Lo and Belgian artist Stromae, released on June 12, 2026, through her independent label Pretty Swede Records as the second single from her sixth studio album Estrus (2026).

== Composition and release ==
Described as an electro-pop track, "Des fleurs" combines Tove Lo's signature electronic pop sound with Stromae's distinctive musical style. The song was written by Tove Lo and Stromae (Paul van Haver), while the production was handled by Oscar Görres, and Stromae. The track features electronic beats, atmospheric synthesizers, and vocals from both artists.

Released as the follow-up to "I'm Your Girl Right?", the song marked Tove Lo's collaboration with the Belgian musician and continued the promotion of her sixth studio album Estrus (2026).

== Music video ==
A music video for "Des fleurs", directed by French filmmaker Melchoir Leroux and produced by Dependant, was released on June 30, 2026. Filmed in Paris, France, the video features both Tove Lo and Stromae in a surreal, flower-filled setting. Combining retro-inspired imagery, theatrical performances, and modern visual effects, the video draws inspiration from early 20th-century aesthetics, creating a dreamlike and cinematic atmosphere.

== Personnel ==
Credits adapted from Estrus (2026) liner notes:

- Written by: Tove Lo and Stromae
- Produced by: Stromae and Oscar Görres
- Vocals produced by: Tove Lo, Stromae, and Oscar Görres
- Lead vocals and background vocals by: Tove Lo and Stromae
- Main Programming, Drums, Keys, Bass by: Stromae
- Additional Programming, Drums, Keys, Bass by: Oscar Görres
- Engineered by: Oscar Görres and Lionel Capoulliez

== Charts ==
Chart performance
Chart (2026)	Peak position
Belgium (Ultratop 50 Flanders)	47
Belgium (Ultratop 50 Wallonia)	1
France (SNEP)	48
France Airplay (SNEP)	9

== Certifications ==
Certifications
Region	Certification	Certified units/sales
Belgium (BRMA)	Gold	20,000^{‡}
France (SNEP)	Gold	100,000^{‡}
^{‡} Sales+streaming figures based on certification alone.
