= TEED =

British electronic musician (born 1986)

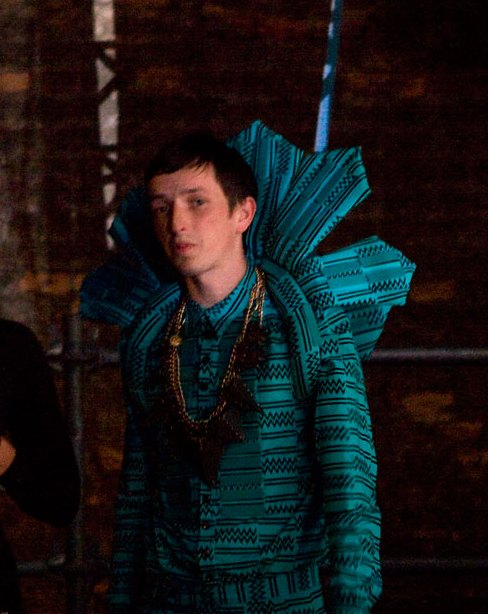
- Higginbottom in 2012

Background information
- Also known as: Totally Enormous Extinct Dinosaurs
- Born: Orlando Tobias Edward Higginbottom; 7 March 1986 (age 40); London, England
- Genres: Future house; electro; indie pop; UK garage
- Occupations: Record producer; singer; songwriter; DJ
- Years active: 2008–present
- Labels: Polydor; Nice Age
- Website: www.totallyenormousextinctdinosaurs.com

Orlando Tobias Edward Higginbottom (born 7 March 1986), known professionally as TEED (formerly known as Totally Enormous Extinct Dinosaurs), is a British electronic music producer, DJ and singer-songwriter based in the United States.

== Early life ==
Orlando is the son of Professor Edward Higginbottom, formerly conductor of the choir of New College, Oxford. He was educated at Abingdon School and Cherwell School, Oxford. A classically trained musician, he attended the Junior Royal Academy of Music in London. Orlando began listening to electronic music in his early teens, through borrowing audio tapes from his older siblings.

Orlando commented to Spin that he was looking for a name that "couldn't be cool, couldn't be put into some kind of scene that gets hip for six months and then falls out of fashion."

== Musical career ==
On 11 June 2012, TEED's debut album Trouble was released by Polydor Records. The album was well received, with favourable reviews from several well-respected music publications including the NME ("One of the UK's most exciting young producers"), Pitchfork and the BBC. Trouble was named by iTunes UK as their 'Debut Electronic album of the year', it was DJ Magazine's 'album of the year' and was number 5 in the BBC's end of year album poll.

Trouble was also voted 'Best Album' in DJ Magazine's Best of British 2012, with TEED also picking up the award for 'Best Live Act'.

On 8 July 2013, Crosstown Rebels released Get Lost VI, a compilation of music curated and mixed by TEED. Get Lost VI featured tracks from Underground Resistance, Tiga, Breach, Trus'me, Axel Boman, Dave Aju, Mathew Jonson and more. It was voted 'Best Compilation' in DJ Magazine's Best of British 2013.

On 14 August 2014, TEED launched Nice Age, a cross-platform label. The first release, "Feels Like", is a collaboration between TEED and Anna Lunoe.

TEED released an EP titled The Distance in 2021.

On 30 March 2022, TEED announced his second album When the Lights Go, which was supposed to be released on 22 July 2022, but was delayed until 9 September 2022 and was released on his own label, Nice Age.

== Discography ==
=== Studio albums ===
Title	Album details
Trouble	Released: 11 June 2012; Label: Polydor; Formats: CD, digital download, Vinyl (2xLP, Album)
When the Lights Go	Released: 9 September 2022; Label: Nice Age; Formats: CD, digital download, Vinyl (2xLP, Album), cassette
Always with Me	Released: 5 December 2025; Label: Nice Age; Formats: CD, digital download, Vinyl (2xLP, Album), cassette

=== Extended plays ===
- All in One Sixty Dancehalls (2009), Greco-Roman
- All in Two Sixty Dancehalls (2010), Greco-Roman
- Household Goods (2010), Greco-Roman
- Prehistory (2011), Greco-Roman
- Prehistory II (2011), Greco-Roman
- I Can Hear the Birds (2020), I Oh You
- The Distance (2021), Nice Age

=== Singles ===
==== As lead artist ====
List of singles, with year released, selected chart positions and album name shown
Title	Year	Peak chart positions				Album
Title	Year	UK	UK Dance	BEL (Vl)	US Dance	Album
"Trouble"	2011	—	—	—	—	Trouble
"Garden"	2011	135	23	87	—	Trouble
"You Need Me on My Own"	2012	—	—	—	—	Trouble
"Tapes & Money"	2012	—	—	—	—	Trouble
"Stronger / American Dream Part II"	2012	—	—	—	—	Trouble
"Household Goods" (re-release)"	2012	—	—	—	—	Trouble
"Your Love"	2012	—	—	105	—	Trouble
"Lion, the Lion" (with Eats Everything)	2013	—	—	—	—	Get Lost VI
"Without You" (with Dillon Francis)	2013	—	—	—	38	Non-album singles
"Feels Like" (with Anna Lunoe)	2014	—	—	—	—	Non-album singles
"Leave a Light On"	2018	—	—	—	—	Non-album singles
"Don't You Forget About Me"	2018	—	—	—	—	Non-album singles
"Body Move"	2018	—	—	—	—	Non-album singles
"Energy Fantasy"	2018	—	—	—	—	Non-album singles
"Again" (with SG Lewis)	2018	—	—	—	—	Dark EP
"Radical" (with Amtrac)	2020	—	—	—	—	Oddyssey
"Heartbreak" (with Bonobo)"	2020	—	—	—	—	Non-album singles
"6000 Ft." (with Bonobo)	2020	—	—	—	—	Non-album singles
"Unfold" (with Porter Robinson)	2021	—	—	—	19	Nurture
"Blood in the Snow"	2022	—	—	—	—	When the Lights Go
"Crosswalk"	2022	—	—	—	—	When the Lights Go
"The Sleeper"	2022	—	—	—	—	When the Lights Go
"Forever"	2022	—	—	—	—	When the Lights Go
"Never Seen You Dance"	2022	—	—	—	—	When the Lights Go
"When the Lights Go"	2022	—	—	—	—	When the Lights Go
"So Alive" (with Moullinex)	2023	—	—	—	—	Non-album single
"Right Here" (with Anna Lunoe)	2024	—	—	—	—	Pearl
"Back in Time" (with Culture Shock)	2024	—	—	—	—	Non-album single
"Desire"	2025	—	—	—	—	Always with Me
"The Echo"	2025	—	—	—	—	Always with Me
"My Melody"	2025	—	—	—	—	Always with Me
"Piece of Me"	2025	—	—	—	—	Always with Me
"Come Tonight"	2025	—	—	—	—	Always with Me
"—" denotes a recording that did not chart or was not released.

=== Featured appearances ===
List of singles and appearances as a featured artist, with year released and album
Title	Year	Album
"My Life Is Complete" (Chad Valley featuring Totally Enormous Extinct Dinosaurs)	2012	Young Hunger
"Without You" (Dillon Francis featuring Totally Enormous Extinct Dinosaurs)	2013	Non-album single
"Again" (SG Lewis featuring Totally Enormous Extinct Dinosaurs)	2018	Dark EP
"Radical" (Amtrac featuring Totally Enormous Extinct Dinosaurs)	2020	Oddyssey
"Dawn" (Bronson featuring Totally Enormous Extinct Dinosaurs)	2020	Bronson
"Walking on Water" (The Knocks featuring Totally Enormous Extinct Dinosaurs)	2022	HISTORY

==== Other albums ====
- Kinshasa One Two
  as part of DRC Music led by Damon Albarn (2012), Warp

=== Songwriting and production credits ===
Year	Artist	Song	Album
2013	Banks	"Warm Water"	Goddess
2014	Banks	"You Should Know Where I'm Coming From"	Goddess
2014	Banks	"Fuck Em Only We Know"	Goddess
2014	Banks	"Under the Table"	Goddess
2014	Banks	"And I Drove You Crazy"	Goddess
2014	Banks	"Bedroom Wall"	Goddess
2015	Mark Ronson	"I Can't Lose" feat. Keyone Starr	Uptown Special
2016	Boys Noize	"2 Live"	Mayday
2018	Elderbrook	"Bird Song"	Old Friend EP
2019	Kelsey Lu	"Blood"	Blood
2019	Shura	"The Stage"	Forevher
2019	Shura	"Tommy"	Forevher
2020	SG Lewis	"Impact" with Robyn and Channel Tres	Times
2020	Elderbrook	"Why Do We Shake in the Cold?"	Why Do We Shake in the Cold?
2020	SG Lewis	"Time" with Rhye	Times
2021	SG Lewis	"Fall"	Times
2021	Shura	"T-Shirt"	Forevher: Deluxe Edition
2021	Anna Lunoe	"Back Seat" feat. Genesis Owusu	Non-album single
2023	SG Lewis	Infatuation	AudioLust & HigherLove
2023	SG Lewis	Call On Me with Tove Lo	AudioLust & HigherLove
2023	SG Lewis	Oh Laura	AudioLust & HigherLove
2023	SG Lewis	Honest	AudioLust & HigherLove
2024	SG Lewis and Tove Lo	"Heat"	Heat EP
2024	SG Lewis and Tove Lo	"Let Me Go Oh Oh"	Heat EP
2024	SG Lewis and Tove Lo	"Busy Girl"	Heat EP
2024	Nelly Furtado	Honesty	7
2026	Madeon	"Super Platinum" feat. Erick the Architect	Victory
2026	Madeon	"Lonely Space Age"	Victory

=== Remixes ===
Year	Artist	Song
2008	Sugababes	"Denial"
2009	Asavioure & DJ IQ	"Cracked It"
2010	Fenech-Soler	"Lies"
2010	Professor Green	"Monster"
2010	Sky Ferreira	"One"
2010	Darwin Deez	"Constellations"
2010	Tinashé	"Saved"
2010	Wafa	"Ewid Disco"
2010	Killa Kela	"Everyday"
2010	Deathray Trebuchay	"No 6 Friend 1"
2011	Fur Coat	"Space Ballad"
2011	Lee Mortimer	"Where the Party At"
2011	Donae'o (featuring Terri Walker)	"When Angels Sing"
2011	Katy Perry	"Firework"
2011	Lady Gaga	"Marry the Night"
2011	The 2 Bears	"The Lunatics"
2011	Crystal Fighters	"Xtatic Truth"
2011	Friendly Fires	"Hawaiian Air"
2012	Jonquil	"It's My Part"
2013	Foals	"My Number"
2013	Zinc (featuring Sasha Keable)	"Only for Tonight"
2013	Disclosure	"F for You"
2014	Little Dragon	"Paris"
2018	Low Island	"The Whole World Tucked Away"
2020	Lastlings	"Take My Hand" (Sky and Earth Remix)
2020	Bag Raiders (featuring Panama)	"How Long"
2020	Jessie Ware	"Save a Kiss"
2020	LA Priest	"Beginning"
2020	Darkstar	"Text"
2020	Damian Lazarus	"Holy"
2021	Silly Boy Blue	"The Riddle"
2021	Jake Shears	"Do the Television"
2021	Gorgon City and Jem Cooke	"Dreams"

== See also ==
- List of Old Abingdonians
