= Nothing's Real =

2016 studio album by Shura

Studio album by Shura
- Released: 8 July 2016
- Recorded: 2014–2016
- Studio: The Neighbourhood (London) (Note: All tracks); Echo (Los Angeles) (Note: Tracks 3 and 9); Wendyhouse (London) (Note: Track 5); The Spaceship (London and California)
- Genre: Electropop
- Length: 49:00
- Label: Polydor
- Producer: Greg Kurstin; Joel Laslett Pott; Shura; Al Shux

Shura chronology
White Light EP (2015)	Nothing's Real (2016)	Forevher (2019)

Singles from Nothing's Real
- 1. "Touch" Released: 4 March 2014; 2. "Indecision" Released: 26 October 2014; 3. "2Shy" Released: 10 March 2015; 4. "White Light" Released: 10 July 2015; 5. "What's It Gonna Be?" Released: 30 June 2016; 6. "The Space Tapes" Released: 8 July 2016; 7. "311215" Released: 23 September 2016; 8. "Nothing's Real" Released: 4 November 2016

Nothing's Real is the debut studio album by the English singer Shura, released on 8 July 2016 by Polydor Records. The album was met with positive reviews from music critics.

== Critical reception ==
Professional ratings
Aggregate scores
Source	Rating
AnyDecentMusic?	7.8/10
Metacritic	79/100
Review scores
Source	Rating
AllMusic	4/5 stars
Clash	8/10
Exclaim!	7/10
The Guardian	4/5 stars
musicOMH	4.5/5 stars
NME	4/5
Pitchfork	7.7/10
PopMatters	8/10 stars
Q	3/5 stars
Rolling Stone	3.5/5 stars

Nothing's Real received generally positive reviews from music critics. At Metacritic, which assigns a normalised rating out of 100 to reviews from mainstream publications, the album received an average score of 79, based on 18 reviews. Heather Phares of AllMusic wrote that Nothing's Real "boasts richer songwriting and wider-ranging sounds than might have been expected", concluding that the album "marks Shura as the kind of smart pop star the 2010s need." Rob Mesure of musicOMH called the album "beautifully constructed" and stated, "The sound might be '80s, but this is undeniably now, and Shura a new star in 2016's increasingly bible-black night." Andrew Paschal of PopMatters commented that the album is "packed with solid, infectious, deeply catchy pop songs, most all of which can stand alone just as easily as they can run with the pack." Writing for Pitchfork, Laura Snapes remarked that Shura is "at the vanguard of a scene of young queer pop stars who are updating the '80s model of self-sufficient, fully liberated mainstream pop", adding that the album "offers a fresh vision for pop's new reality."

Lisa Henderson of Clash opined, "Previously heard tracks still stand up as pop juggernauts but there's an obvious growth that has happened during the two-year wait; sonically and lyrically, Shura is at her most urgent and incisive." Harriet Gibsone of The Guardian felt that the album's "more uptempo moments are especially promising; melodies so satisfying she should consider handing them to a major-league artist in need of a reboot." Hannah Ziegler of Exclaim! viewed the album as "a neon sugar rush that occasionally fizzles out with filler tracks", commenting that it "ultimately leaves a lasting impression". Joe Levy of Rolling Stone dubbed the album "a tangle of glam and glum" and wrote that Shura's videos "make clear the subjects of these songs ['What's It Gonna Be?', '2Shy' and 'Indecision'] are often women, but on record her work is open-ended—a map to a treasure that's just never there." Hannah J. Davies of Q magazine expressed, "Avoiding the abstract experimentalism of her sample-heavy single 'The Space Tapes', she gives a fine display of how to be both retro and radio-friendly."

=== Accolades ===
Accolades for Nothing's Real
Publication	Accolade	Rank	Ref.
The Guardian	The Best Albums of 2016	40	
Idolator	The 10 Best Albums of 2016	5	
musicOMH	Top 50 Albums of 2016	12	
The Skinny	Top 50 Albums of 2016	19	
The Sunday Times	100 Best Records of the Year	35	
Variance	50 Best Albums of 2016	39	

== Commercial performance ==
Nothing's Real debuted at number 13 on the UK Albums Chart, selling 4,777 copies in its first week.

== Track listing ==
No.	Title	Writer(s)	Producer(s)	Length
1.	"(I)"	Aleksandra Lilah Denton; Luke Saunders	Joel Laslett Pott; Shura	1:29
2.	"Nothing's Real"	Denton; Pott	Pott; Shura	4:07
3.	"What's It Gonna Be?"	Greg Kurstin; Denton; Maureen "Mozella" McDonald; Pott	Kurstin; Pott^{[a]}; Shura^{[a]}	3:34
4.	"Touch"	Denton; Pott	Pott; Shura	3:34
5.	"Kidz 'n' Stuff"	Denton; Alexander Shuckburgh	Pott; Al Shux; Shura	5:10
6.	"Indecision"	Denton; Pott	Pott; Shura	3:32
7.	"What Happened to Us?"	Denton; Pott	Pott; Shura	4:09
8.	"(II)"	Denton; Pott	Pott; Shura	0:45
9.	"Tongue Tied"	Kurstin; Denton; McDonald	Kurstin; Pott^{[a]}; Shura^{[a]}	3:50
10.	"Make It Up"	Denton; Pott	Pott; Shura	3:31
11.	"2Shy"	Denton; Pott	Pott; Shura	4:38
12.	"White Light" / "311215" (hidden track)	Denton; Pott ("White Light") / Denton ("311215")	Pott; Shura	10:41
Total length:				49:00

Digital edition bonus track
No.	Title	Writer(s)	Producer(s)	Length
13.	"The Space Tapes"	Denton; Pott	Shura	9:33
Total length:				58:33

=== Notes ===
- ^{^[a]} signifies an additional producer

== Personnel ==
Credits adapted from the liner notes of Nothing's Real.

=== Musicians ===
- Shura – synths (tracks 1, 2, 4, 6, 7, 10, 12a, 12b); programming (track 1); vocals (tracks 2–7, 9–12b); keyboards (tracks 2, 4, 6, 7, 10, 12a, 12b); backing vocals, programming (track 4); percussion (tracks 4, 12a); guitar (tracks 10, 12b); synth bass (track 12a)
- Joel Laslett Pott – guitar (tracks 1–7, 9–11); keyboards, synths (all tracks); programming (tracks 2–4, 6, 7, 10–12a); bass (tracks 2, 4, 7, 9, 10, 11); backing vocals (tracks 2, 3, 7, 11); percussion (tracks 4, 6, 7, 10–12a); piano (tracks 4, 11); synth bass (tracks 4, 6, 12a); additional programming (track 9); electric guitar (track 12a)
- Luke Saunders – synths (tracks 1, 12a); synth bass, programming (track 1); guitar (tracks 2, 5, 7); backing vocals (tracks 2, 7); bass guitar (tracks 6, 12a); electric guitar, keyboards (track 12a)
- Matt Ritson – drums, additional beats, percussion, samples (track 2)
- Will Ritson – drums, percussion, PO-12 (track 2)
- Kirsty Mangan – strings (track 2)
- Rachel Lander – strings (track 2)
- Greg Kurstin – keyboards, drums, bass (tracks 3, 9); guitar (track 9)
- Al Shux – programming, percussion, synth bass, keyboards, synths (track 5)
- Maxwell Cooke – synth bass (track 5)
- Ally Wilkinson – drums (tracks 5, 7, 11, 12a); percussion (tracks 7, 11, 12a)
- Stephen Roberts – drums (tracks 6, 9, 10); percussion (tracks 6, 10)
- Dan Grech-Marguerat – additional programming (track 12a)
- Giacki Watterson – beat programming (track 12b)
- Jonny Pilcher – piano (track 12b)

=== Technical ===
- Joel Laslett Pott – production (tracks 1, 2, 4–8, 10–12b); recording engineering (all tracks); additional production (tracks 3, 9)
- Shura – production (tracks 1, 2, 4–8, 10–12b); additional production (tracks 3, 9)
- Daniel Moyler – recording engineering (tracks 1–3, 5–7, 9–12b)
- David Wrench – mixing (tracks 1, 5–11, 12b)
- Marta Salogni – mixing assistance (tracks 1, 5–11, 12b)
- Steph Marziano – mixing assistance (tracks 1, 5–11, 12b)
- Tom Stanley – recording engineering (tracks 2, 5–8, 11, 12a)
- Carey Willetts – recording engineering (track 2)
- Mark "Spike" Stent – mixing (tracks 2–4)
- Michael Freeman – mixing assistance (tracks 2–4)
- Geoff Swan – mixing assistance (tracks 2–4)
- Greg Kurstin – production, recording engineering (tracks 3, 9)
- Alex Pasco – recording engineering (tracks 3, 9)
- Julian Burg – recording engineering (tracks 3, 9)
- Al Shux – production, recording engineering (track 5)
- Dan Grech-Marguerat – mixing (track 12a)
- Mandy Parnell – mastering

=== Artwork ===
- Mat Maitland – art direction
- Shura – art direction
- Louise Pomeroy – illustrations
- Andrew Whitton – photography

== Charts ==
Chart performance for Nothing's Real
Chart (2016)	Peak position
Australian Hitseekers Albums (ARIA)	6
Belgian Albums (Ultratop Flanders)	73
Belgian Albums (Ultratop Wallonia)	130
Irish Albums (IRMA)	73
New Zealand Heatseeker Albums (RMNZ)	8
Scottish Albums (OCC)	15
Swiss Albums (Schweizer Hitparade)	35
UK Albums (OCC)	13
US Heatseekers Albums (Billboard)	12
US Top Dance Albums (Billboard)	3
