= Trouble (Totally Enormous Extinct Dinosaurs album) =

2012 studio album by Totally Enormous Extinct Dinosaurs

Studio album by Totally Enormous Extinct Dinosaurs
- Released: 8 June 2012
- Studio: Metropolis Mastering (London, England); Big Active (London, England)
- Length: 63:46
- Label: Polydor
- Producer: Orlando Tobias Edward Higginbottom

Totally Enormous Extinct Dinosaurs chronology
| Prehistory II (2011) | Trouble (2012) | I Can Hear the Birds (2020) |

Singles from Trouble
- 1. "Trouble" Released: 5 May 2011; 2. "Garden" Released: 14 October 2011; 3. "You Need Me On My Own" Released: 17 January 2012; 4. "Tapes & Money" Released: 29 March 2012; 5. "Stronger" Released: 25 June 2012; 6. "Household Goods" Released: 17 August 2012; 7. "Your Love" Released: 26 October 2012

Professional ratings
Aggregate scores
| Source | Rating |
|---|---|
| Metacritic | 75/100 |
Review scores
| Source | Rating |
| AllMusic | 4/5 stars |
| Pitchfork | 7.3/10 |

Trouble is the first studio album by English electronic musician and producer Totally Enormous Extinct Dinosaurs (credited as Orlando Higginbottom), released on 8 June 2012 by Polydor Records.

== Track listing ==
| No. | Title | Length |
|---|---|---|
| 1. | "Promises" | 4:20 |
| 2. | "Trouble" | 3:54 |
| 3. | "Shimmer" | 4:45 |
| 4. | "Household Goods" | 3:35 |
| 5. | "Your Love" | 3:50 |
| 6. | "You Need Me On My Own" | 3:45 |
| 7. | "Panpipes" | 6:11 |
| 8. | "Garden" | 4:36 |
| 9. | "Solo" | 5:48 |
| 10. | "Tapes & Money" | 3:40 |
| 11. | "American Dream Part II" | 5:08 |
| 12. | "Closer" | 6:38 |
| 13. | "Fair" | 2:32 |
| 14. | "Stronger" | 5:04 |
| 15. | "Blood Pressure (Beatport Exclusive)" | 4:09 |
| Total length: | | 63:46 |

== Personnel ==
Adapted from the album's liner notes.

- Orlando Higginbottom – writing, instruments, programming, vocals (1–15)

Other musicians

- Edmund Finnis – writing (1–2, 10–12, 14), guitar (1), synth (2, 14), Rhodes piano (11), vocals (12)
- Luisa Gerstein – writing (8, 13), vocals (8, 12–13)
- G. Clinton – writing, elements ("One Nation under a Groove") (10)
- G. Shider – writing, elements (10)
- W. Morrison – writing, elements (10)
- Robin McDiarmid – guitar (1)
- Yolanda – vocals (5)
- Sam Scott – trumpet (7)
- Stuart Hawkes – mastering (1–15)

=== Artwork and design ===
- Orlando Higginbottom – art direction
- Mat Maitland – art direction, design
- Stephanie Sian Smith – photography
- Marc Sethi – studio image
  - Jethro Buck – additional collage
- Yunus & Eliza – headpiece on front cover
  - Swarovski – elements for headpiece

== Charts ==
Chart performance for Trouble
| Chart (2012) | Peak position |
|---|---|
| Australian Digital Albums (ARIA) | 31 |
| Scottish Albums (OCC) | 58 |
| UK Albums (OCC) | 35 |

2026 weekly chart performance for Trouble
| Chart (2026) | Peak position |
|---|---|
| UK Dance Albums (OCC) | 1 |

== Release history ==
Release dates and formats for Trouble
| Region | Date | Label | Formats | Ref. |
|---|---|---|---|---|
| United Kingdom | 11 June 2012 | Polydor | CD; digital download | |
| Australia | 8 June 2012 | Polydor | CD | |
