= Lastlings =

Australian electronic pop duo

- Origin: Gold Coast, Queensland, Australia
- Genres: Synthpop; electronic; dance
- Instruments: Guitar; synthesizer; drums; digital audio workstation
- Years active: 2015–present
- Labels: Exist. Recordings; Rose Avenue
- Members: Amy Dowdle; Josh Dowdle

Lastlings are an Australian electronic pop band from Gold Coast, Queensland made up of brother and sister duo Amy and Josh Dowdle. They have performed at Coachella, Spilt Milk, Splendour in the Grass, and The Plot. The duo are well known for their song "Deja Vu", which received high rotation on triple j. Lastlings supported Two Door Cinema Club on their Australian national tour.

== Career ==
=== 2015–2021: First Contact ===
The project began while Amy was in high school; at the time Josh was studying biomedical science and working in fashion, from the age of 8 he studied classical music. Drummers Dave Jenkins and Shane Benson are interchangeably added to the band's lineup for live performances.

In 2017 Lastlings embarked on an Australian regional tour with Rüfüs Du Sol, they joined the band nationally in 2019 before supporting them throughout the United States. The same year they featured on triple j's Mix Up program for an hour long DJ set.

=== 2022–present: Perfect World ===
In October 2022, Lastlings released single "Get What You Want" via Rose Avenue Records. This was followed by "Holding Me Like Water" in January and "Noise" in March 2023. The duo's second studio album, Perfect World is scheduled for release in June 2023. In an album review, Alex Gallagher from NME said "While the production feels crisp and contemporary, Perfect World feels grounded in one of dance music's oldest traditions: prioritising emotional connection above all. When singer Amy Dowdle's impassioned vocals soar over shimmering synths and electronic drums, the songs on Perfect World – at their peak – feel at once utterly euphoric and devastating."

== Influences ==
The band have cited Jamie xx and Nicolas Jaar as influences.

== Discography ==
=== Studio albums ===
List of studio albums, with release date and label shown
Title	Album details	Peak chart positions
Title	Album details	AUS
First Contact	Released: 20 November 2020; Label: Rose Avenue, Liberation; Formats: LP, Digital download, streaming	89
Perfect World	Released: 23 June 2023; Label: Liberation; Formats: CD, digital download, streaming	39

=== Remix albums ===
List of Remix albums, with year released and selected details
Title	Details
First Contact (The Remixes)	Released: 23 July 2021; Label: Liberation Records; Formats: Digital download, streaming
Perfect World Remixes Vol. 1	Released: 2 November 2023; Label: Liberation Records; Formats: Digital download, streaming
Perfect World Remixes Vol. 2	Released: 17 November 2023; Label: Liberation Records; Formats: Digital download, streaming

=== Extended plays ===
List of EPs, with year released and selected details
Title	Details
Unreality	Released: 20 January 2016; Label: Lastlings; Formats: Digital download, streaming
Verses	Released: 17 March 2017; Label: Exist.; Formats: Digital download, streaming
Live Acoustic	Released: 18 March 2021; Label: Liberation Records; Formats: Digital download, streaming

=== Singles ===
==== As lead artist ====
List of singles as lead artist, with year released and album shown
Title	Year	Album
"Verona"	2015	Unreality
"Wavelength"	2015	Unreality
"Chills"	2015	Unreality
"You"	2016	Verses
"Time"	2016	Verses
"Urges"	2017	Verses
"Déjà Vu"	2018	First Contact
"I've Got You"	2019	First Contact
"Last Breath"	2019	First Contact
"Take My Hand"	2020	First Contact
"No Time" (original or Rüfüs Du Sol remix)	2020	First Contact
"Out of Touch"	2020	First Contact
"Get What You Want"	2022	Perfect World
"Holding Me Like Water"	2023	Perfect World
"Noise"	2023	Perfect World
"Out My Head"	2023	Perfect World
"Gravity"	2023	Perfect World

==== As featured artist ====
List of singles as featured artist, with year released and album shown
Title	Year	Album
"Awake" (North Elements featuring Nico Ghost and Lastlings)	2015	Non-album singles
"Love Like This" (Indian Summer featuring Lastlings)	2016	Non-album singles

=== Guest appearances ===
List of guest appearances, with year released and album shown
Title	Year	Album
"All We Have" (SG Lewis featuring Lastlings)	2021	Times

=== Remixes ===
List of remixes, with year released and album shown
Title	Artist	Year	Album
"Solace" (Lastlings Remix)	Rüfüs Du Sol	2019	Solace Remixed
"Flames" (Lastlings Remix)	SG Lewis (featuring Ruel)	2019	Non-album single
"Together" (Lastlings Remix)	Cassian (featuring Thandi Phoenix)	2020	Laps
"The Blame" (Lastlings Remix)	Bob Moses	2021	Non-album single

== Awards ==
=== AIR Awards ===
The Australian Independent Record Awards (known colloquially as the AIR Awards) is an annual awards night to recognise, promote and celebrate the success of Australia's Independent Music sector.

Year	Nominee / work	Award	Result	Ref.
2021	First Contact	Best Independent Dance or Electronica Album or EP	Nominated	

=== ARIA Music Awards ===
The ARIA Music Awards is an annual award ceremony event celebrating the Australian music industry.

Year	Nominee / work	Award	Result	Ref.
2023	Perfect World	Best Dance/Electronic Release	Nominated	

=== J Awards ===
The J Awards are an annual series of Australian music awards that were established by the Australian Broadcasting Corporation's youth-focused radio station Triple J. They commenced in 2005.

Year	Nominee / work	Award	Result	Ref.
2023	Perfect World	Australian Album of the Year	Nominated	

=== Music Victoria Awards ===
The Music Victoria Awards are an annual awards night celebrating Victorian music. They commenced in 2006.

Year	Nominee / work	Award	Result	Ref.
2023	Lastlings	Best Electronic Work	Nominated	

=== National Live Music Awards ===
The National Live Music Awards (NLMAs) commenced in 2016 to recognise contributions to the live music industry in Australia.

Year	Nominee / work	Award	Result	Ref.
2023	Lastlings	Best DJ/Electronic Act	Nominated	

=== Queensland Music Awards ===
The Queensland Music Awards (previously known as Q Song Awards) are annual awards celebrating Queensland, Australia's brightest emerging artists and established legends. They commenced in 2006.

Year	Nominee / work	Award	Result (wins only)	Ref.
2021	"Out of Touch" (directed by Dylan Dulcos, Rico Zhang)	Video Award	Won	
