= I Got Too Sad for My Friends =

Studio album by Shura
- Released: May 30, 2025
- Studio: The Pool; Acetate; Orbb; Easy Peeler; Hush Hush; Rex; Cross Town; The Bomb Shelter
- Genre: Art pop
- Length: 38:34
- Label: Play It Again Sam
- Producer: Shura; Luke Smith

Shura chronology
Forevher (2019)	I Got Too Sad for My Friends (2025)

Singles from I Got Too Sad for My Friends
- 1. "Recognise" Released: 22 January 2025; 2. "Richardson" Released: 26 February 2025; 3. "World's Worst Girlfriend" Released: 16 April 2025

I Got Too Sad for My Friends is the third studio album by the English singer Shura. It was released via Play It Again Sam, on 30 May 2025. It was preceded by three singles, "Recognise", "World's Worst Girlfriend" and "Richardson", and Shura's 2019 project, Forevher.

== Background ==
Noted as an art pop album with elements of electro, folk and synth-pop, I Got Too Sad for My Friends is composed of eleven songs ranging between two and four minutes each, with a total runtime of approximately thirty-eight minutes. "Recognise" was released as the first single on 22 January 2025. It was followed by the second single, "Richardson", featuring American singer Cassandra Jenkins, on 26 February 2025. "World's Worst Girlfriend", was released on 16 April 2025, as the album's third single.

== Reception ==
Professional ratings
Review scores
Source	Rating
Clash	8/10 stars
DIY	3.5/5 stars
Dork	4/5 stars
Evening Standard	4/5 stars
The Line of Best Fit	7/10 stars
Pitchfork	7.0/10
The Skinny	4/5 stars

The album received a 7.0 rating from Pitchfork's Marissa Lorusso, who stated, "At its best, I Got Too Sad doesn't just offer a clichéd reminder that it's OK to cry; it suggests that looking closely at any one emotion can be a means of letting more light in." The Skinny gave it a four-star rating and remarked, "The album is a lesson in melancholy. You'd expect that, it is called I Got Too Sad for My Friends, after all. But that isn't the full story." Clash assigned it a score of eight out of ten, noting "Guest appearances from Helado Negro and Becca Mancari add languid brushstrokes to the album's final tracks that cap off a potent third record that retains a pop heart whilst wandering off into compelling new terrain." I Got Too Sad for My Friends was given a rating of four out of five by Dork reviewer Felicity Newton, who described it as "trading the polished electronic sheen of her earlier work for something more organic and emotionally raw."

Evening Standard, stating "this feels like a brave album in which outside and inside forces are taken on with these songs. And again: what a voice," assigned the album a rating of four stars. Otis Robinson, writing for DIY, rated it three and a half stars and opined, "Though there's a helpless frustration at the heart of (the album), it's far more tender in its retrospection to be unforgiving of herself. Touchingly, hope is always plentiful. (The album) promises there's always sunshine at the end of perseverance." The project was given a score of seven out of ten by The Line of Best Fit reviewer David Cobbald, who described it as "a wonderfully made piece of easy listening, it takes Shura away from the love-sick girl of the 2010s and shows a woman now in her 30s who sees the world for what it is."

== Track listing ==
All lyrics are written by Aleksandra Denton.

I Got Too Sad for my Friends track listing
No.	Title	Music	Length
1.	"Tokyo"	Denton; Luke Saunders	3:26
2.	"Leonard Street"	Denton; Maverick Sabre; Ed Thomas	3:31
3.	"Recognise"	Denton; Paul Hammer	4:29
4.	"World's Worst Girlfriend"	Denton; Martin Hadley	2:41
5.	"Richardson" (featuring Cassandra Jenkins)	Denton; Hammer	3:44
6.	"America"	Denton; Saunders	3:52
7.	"Online"	Denton; Saunders	3:44
8.	"I Wanna Be Love By You"	Denton; Joel Laslett Pott	3:03
9.	"Ringpull"	Denton; Iain Archer	2:55
10.	"If You Don't Believe in Love" (featuring Helado Negro)	Denton; Sabre; Thomas	4:14
11.	"Bad Kid" (featuring Becca Mancari)	Denton; Pott	2:55
Total length:			38:34

== Personnel ==
Credits adapted from the album's liner notes.

=== Musicians ===
- Shura – vocals, guitar, synthesizers, piano, additional programming
- Cassandra Jenkins – additional vocals on "Richardson"
- Helado Negro – additional vocals on "If You Don't Believe In Love"
- Becca Mancari – additional vocals on "Bad Kid"
- Joel Laslett Pott – backing vocals, additional guitar, synthesizers
- Tobie Tripp – backing vocals, strings, piano
- Kojo Degraft-Johnson – backing vocals
- Annabel Spooner – backing vocals
- Meshach Spooner – backing vocals
- Maverick Sabre – backing vocals
- Nicholas Denton – backing vocals
- Pauline Le Mell – backing vocals
- Daniel Moyler – backing vocals
- Peanut – backing vocals
- Axel Ekermann – bass
- Leo Abrahams – guitar
- Barrie Cadogan – guitar
- Luke Saunders – additional guitar
- Liam Hutton – drums
- Tuca Milan – percussion
- Luke Smith – additional percussion, synthesizers, programming
- Harvey Grant – synthesizers, Hammond organ, piano
- Paul Jones – piano, saxophone
- Stephen Black – clarinet, saxophone

=== Technical ===
- Shura – production
- Luke Smith – production
- Joel Laslett Pott – additional co-production
- Daniel James Goodwin – mixing
- Marta Salogni – mixing
- Billy Halliday – engineering
- Animesh Raval – engineering
- Dan Moyler – engineering
- Macks Faulkron – engineering
- Drew Carol – engineering
- Katie Tavini – mastering

=== Visuals ===
- Gilad Kaufman – creative direction, design
- Sophie Williams – photography
