= Times (SG Lewis album) =

Studio album by SG Lewis
- Released: 19 February 2021
- Recorded: 2018–2020
- Genres: Disco; dance-pop; house
- Length: 40:10
- Labels: Virgin EMI; PMR
- Producers: SG Lewis; Totally Enormous Extinct Dinosaurs; Julian Bunetta; Nile Rodgers; Chad Hugo

SG Lewis chronology
Dusk Dark Dawn (2019)	Times (2021)	AudioLust & HigherLove (2023)

Singles from Times
- 1. "Chemicals" Released: 24 April 2020; 2. "Impact" Released: 5 August 2020; 3. "Feed the Fire" Released: 26 October 2020; 4. "Time" Released: 8 December 2020; 5. "One More" Released: 2 February 2021

Times is the debut studio album by English singer-songwriter SG Lewis. It was released on 19 February 2021 by Virgin EMI and PMR Records. It features guest appearances from Rhye, Lucky Daye, Nile Rodgers, Frances, Robyn, Channel Tres and Lastlings.

== Background ==
SG Lewis announced Times through his social media accounts on 27 October 2020. With the announcement, he said:

This album is an ode to the present moment, and the finite chances we have to celebrate it. It's an exploration of escapism and euphoria, and the memories attached to those experiences.

Five singles from Times were released prior to the release of the album; "Chemicals", "Impact", "Feed the Fire", "Time" and "One More".

== Composition ==
Times is a disco album with dance-pop, house, chillwave, electropop and funk influences.

== Critical reception ==
Professional ratings
Aggregate scores
Source	Rating
AnyDecentMusic?	7.1/10
Metacritic	75/100
Review scores
Source	Rating
Clash	8/10
DIY	3/5 stars
MusicOMH	3/5 stars
NME	4/5 stars
Pitchfork	6.9/10
The Guardian	4/5 stars

At Metacritic, which assigns a normalised score out of 100 to critic ratings from publications, the album received an average score of 75 based on 6 reviews, indicating a "generally favourable" response.

Alexis Petridis of The Guardian gave Times a rating of 4 out of 5 stars, and wrote that "Lewis is really skilled at producing disco-infused pop-house" and that his "talent lies in [adding] subtle touches." Writing for NME, Ben Jolley gave the same rating, describing the album as "an incredibly cohesive collection of slide-across-the-kitchen-floor dance-pop bangers that encourage you to hold on to the good times." Dani Blum of Pitchfork praised the album as a "pristine" one made of "frictionless bangers", but noted that the songs are "so controlled that they never come close to catharsis."

=== Year-end lists ===
Critical rankings for Times
Publication	List	Rank	Ref.
Billboard	The 50 Best Albums of 2021: Staff List	47	

== Track listing ==
Times track listing
No.	Title	Writer(s)	Producer(s)	Length
1.	"Time" (featuring Rhye)	Samuel George Lewis; Orlando Higginbottom; Julian Bunetta; Michael Milosh; Dennis Lambert; Duane Hitchings; Franne Golde	Lewis; Totally Enormous Extinct Dinosaurs; Bunetta	4:19
2.	"Feed the Fire" (featuring Lucky Daye)	Lewis; Matthew Johnson; David Brown; Dustin "Dab" Bowie	Lewis	4:05
3.	"Back to Earth"	Lewis; Finlay Robson; Jay Mooncie	Lewis	4:01
4.	"One More" (featuring Nile Rodgers)	Lewis; John Ryan; Bunetta; Nile Rodgers	Lewis; Bunetta; Rodgers	3:16
5.	"Heartbreak on the Dancefloor" (featuring Frances)	Lewis; Sophie Frances Cooke	Lewis	3:15
6.	"Rosner's Interlude"	Lewis	Lewis	1:08
7.	"Chemicals"	Lewis; Stephanie Jones; Bunetta; Chad Hugo	Lewis; Burnetta; Hugo	4:15
8.	"Impact" (with Robyn and Channel Tres)	Lewis; Higginbottom; Robin Miriam Carlsson; Sheldon Young	Lewis; Totally Enormous Extinct Dinosaurs	4:44
9.	"All We Have" (featuring Lastlings)	Lewis; Amy Dowdle; Joshua Dowdle	Lewis	6:50
10.	"Fall"	Lewis; Cooke; Higginbottom	Lewis	4:17
Total length:				40:10

== Personnel ==
Credits adapted from Tidal.

Musicians

- SG Lewis – vocals (all tracks), bass (1, 5, 9, 10), drums (1, 3–5, 9, 10), programming (1–7, 9, 10), synthesizer (1–5, 8, 9), bass programming (2), keyboards (2, 5)
- Julian Bunetta – drums (1, 4), strings (1), synthesizer (4), programming (7)
- Totally Enormous Extinct Dinosaurs – piano (1), drum programming (8), synthesizer (8)
- Rhye – vocals (1)
- Matt Johnson – keyboards (2)
- Simon Hale – string arrangement, strings (2)
- Lucky Daye – vocals (2)
- Finlay Robson – bass (3), keyboards (3)
- Jay Moon – flute (3)
- John Ryan – bass (4)
- Nile Rodgers – guitar (4)
- Frances – keyboards (5, 10), vocals (5)
- Chad Hugo – synthesizer (7)
- Channel Tres – vocals (8)
- Robyn – vocals (8)
- Joshua Dowdle – drums, synthesizer (9)
- Amy Dowdle – vocals (9)

Technical

- Stuart Hawkes – mastering engineer (1–3, 5, 6, 10)
- Mike Marsh – mastering engineer (7, 8)
- Matt Colton – mastering engineer (9)
- Nathan Boddy – mixer (1, 10), mastering engineer (4)
- SG Lewis – mixer (2, 3, 5, 6, 9), recording engineer (7, 8)
- Mark "Spike" Stent – mixer (4, 7, 8)
- Tristan Hoogland – recording engineer (2)
- Ludvig Larsson – recording engineer (8)
- Totally Enormous Extinct Dinosaurs – recording engineer (8)
- Peter Geiser – vocal engineer (1)
- Michael Freeman – assistant mixer (7)

== Charts ==
=== Weekly charts ===
Weekly chart performance for Times
Chart (2021)	Peak position
Lithuanian Albums (AGATA)	77
Scottish Albums (Official Charts)	31
UK Albums (Official Charts)	46
UK Dance Albums (Official Charts)	1

=== Year-end charts ===
Year-end chart performance for Times
Chart (2021)	Position
Australian Dance Albums (ARIA)	46

== Release history ==
Release history for Times
Region	Date	Format(s)	Version	Label	Ref.
Various	19 February 2021	Cassette; CD; digital download; streaming; LP	Standard	Virgin EMI	
