= Garden (Totally Enormous Extinct Dinosaurs song) =

Single by Totally Enormous Extinct Dinosaurs

from the album Trouble
- Released: 14 October 2011
- Recorded: 2011
- Length: 4:16
- Label: Polydor Records
- Songwriter(s): Orlando Higginbottom; Luisa Gerstein
- Producer(s): Higginbottom

Totally Enormous Extinct Dinosaurs singles chronology
"Trouble" (2011)	"Garden" (2011)	"You Need Me On My Own" (2012)

"Garden" is a song by English electronic music producer and DJ Totally Enormous Extinct Dinosaurs, featuring vocals by Luisa Gerstein. The track was released in the United Kingdom on 14 October 2011 as the second single from his debut studio album, Trouble (2012). The song was written by Higginbottom and Gerstein and produced by Higginbottom.

== Commercial use ==
Nokia used this song between 2011 and 2012 in advertising their first-generation Lumia line of smartphones.

== Track listing ==
Digital download
No.	Title	Length
1.	"Garden"	4:35
2.	"Garden" (Joe Goddard Ornamental Mix)	6:06
3.	"Garden" (Soul Clap Like It's '97 Mix)	6:09
4.	"Garden" (Hackman Remix)	4:32
5.	"Garden" (MYNC Remix)	6:01

== Chart performance ==
Chart (2011)	Peak position
Belgium (Ultratip Bubbling Under Flanders)	37
UK Dance (OCC)	23
UK Singles (Official Charts Company)	135

== Release history ==
Region	Date	Format	Label
United Kingdom	October 14, 2011	Digital download	Polydor Records
