= Touch (Shura song) =

2014 single by Shura

Single by Shura

from the album Nothing's Real
- Released: 4 March 2014
- Recorded: 2014
- Genre: Synth-pop; R&B
- Length: 3:34
- Label: Polydor
- Songwriters: Aleksandra Lilah Denton; Joel Lasley Pott
- Producers: Joel Pott; Shura

Shura singles chronology
"Touch" (2014)	"Indecision" (2015)

"Touch" is a song by English singer Shura. It was released as a single on 4 March 2014 and re-released on 17 February 2016 alongside a bonus featuring vocals from rapper Talib Kweli, through Polydor Records. It eventually became the lead single of Shura's debut studio album, Nothing's Real (2016).

== Background ==
The concept for the song came around just after Shura broke away from recording with Hiatus, a music producer called Cyrus Shahrad. She broke away from the band on a temporary basis so that she could be able to build up her songwriting skills as well as studying at university.

A year later, Shura decided to take a totally different approach and, therefore, never really returned to record with Hiatus, as such Shura went to pursue her career as an independent artist.

In 2014, Shura was experimenting a lot with different artists as well as beginning to experiment as a music producer. She spoke out, saying that, whilst she was on the verge of making her own stuff, she was "crushing hard on analogue synths. There's a fuzziness to analogue synths that I love." During that time out of the music scene, Shura had a few rather rough social times and decided to make a song about it. She began to meet up with musician Joel Pott, who is known for being a member of indie rock band Athlete, and participating in co-writing and producing songs for artists such as London Grammar, George Ezra and Gabrielle Aplin. Shura and Pott both produced and wrote the track and, afterwards, named it "Touch".

The song was released on 4 March 2014 on YouTube and SoundCloud. Its upload to both digital streaming sites began to earn acclaim from various internet blogs and critics alike, reinforced by its powerful music video which features Shura and her friends kissing each other, regardless of gender. The music video for the song was released on the same day, which starred Shura's twin brother Nicholas Denton. The video later went viral and its views on YouTube stand at nearly 31 million as of 17 June 2019. It was also reviewed by critics as having "a little bit of '90s R&B, a little bit '80s pop, with fragments of early Madonna and Janet Jackson, in addition to more contemporary artists such as Dev Hynes and Blood Orange." After she released the song, Shura was signed onto Polydor Records.

However, after the song's original release and the release of many songs after, she re-released the song officially on 17 February 2016 through her signed record label as a promotional release, leading up to the announcement of Shura's debut album, Nothing's Real. Also released was a bonus version with featured vocals from rapper Talib Kweli, who has been known for working with top famous artists such as Kendrick Lamar, Pharrell Williams and Mary J. Blige. Another video was re-released on the same day with stop-motion animation footage from the original music video released two years before.

As well as the song being re-released digitally, it was also released on vinyl. Some remixes included were from artists such as Four Tet, CANVAS and Sorrow. The remix from CANVAS was released officially onto YouTube.

The song's lyrics are about Shura attempting to remain friends with an ex-girlfriend. The music video includes clips of friends of Shura of all genders, sexualities, and ethnicities making out.

== Credits and personnel ==
- Joel Pott – lyricist, synthesizer, synthesizer programming, keyboards, producer, programming, recording engineer, percussion, guitar, piano, bass guitar
- Mandy Parnell – mastering engineer
- Aleksandra Lilah Denton – vocalist (2014), background vocalist (2016), lyricist, percussion, producer, programming
- Talib Kweli – rap vocalist (2016)
- Mark Stent – mixer
- Michael Freeman – assistant mixer
- Geoff Swan – assistant mixer
