= Shura (English singer) =

British musician (born 1988)

- Also known as: Aleksandra Lilah Yakunina-Denton
- Born: Alexandra Lilah Denton; 17 June 1988 (age 38); Hammersmith, London, England
- Origin: Manchester, England
- Genres: Electropop; synth-pop; alternative pop; new wave
- Occupations: Singer; musician
- Instruments: Vocals; guitar; synthesiser
- Years active: 2011–present
- Labels: Polydor; Interscope; Secretly Canadian; Play It Again Sam
- Website: weareshura.com

Alexandra Lilah Denton (also known as Aleksandra Lilah Yakunina-Denton, born 17 June 1988), known professionally as Shura, is an English singer and musician. She is known for her work in the genres of electropop and synth-pop, but has reached into other forms of pop, like indie and folk.

== Career ==
=== 2011–2016: Nothing's Real ===
During night shifts at her workplace (a video editing facility), she watched YouTube tutorial videos on how to use music production software. Her single "Touch", co-produced with Joel Pott of Athlete, drew positive notice from internet blogs during early 2014; its music video was co-directed and edited by Shura herself. Two other singles, "Just Once" and "Indecision", followed the same year, and Shura produced a remix of Jessie Ware's single "Say You Love Me". Shura was longlisted in the BBC Sound of 2015 poll. Shura is also signed to Universal Music Publishing Group in the United Kingdom. She released the single "2Shy" in March 2015, followed by "White Light" and a performance film titled Three Years in June 2015. An EP titled White Light was released in the United States in July. The same year, Shura performed at music festivals including Bestival, Festival N°6, and Latitude.

In December 2014 she was named as one of the nominated acts on the longlist for the BBC music poll Sound of 2015. Mumford & Sons have covered her song "2Shy".

Shura's "Touch" was released on 18 February 2016 alongside a version featuring Talib Kweli. The Original Mix was released on Record Store Day 2016 as a limited 12" single featuring remixes from Canvas and Delorean.

Her debut album Nothing's Real was released on 8 July 2016 via Polydor Records.

=== 2017–present: forevher ===
In 2018, she was reported working in the studio on new music with frequent collaborator Joel Pott, as well as Tourist and Totally Enormous Extinct Dinosaurs.

In 2019, she made a comeback after three years of silence, when she collaborated with British musician Tourist on the song "Love Theme", which was released on Valentine's Day through his second album Everyday. Tourist explained that the song was a concept originally written by Shura and had a piano demo that was sent to him by her with the lyrics "I don't want to be the centre of attention, but I want your love". The following month, Shura announced her comeback single, entitled "BKLYNLDN", alternatively titled "Brooklyn London". It was premiered by Phil Taggart on BBC Radio 1 on 10 March 2019 where it was revealed as the "Chillest Record".

Shura's album Forevher was released on 16 August 2019 via Secretly Canadian. Shura announced the album on 12 June 2019 with the release of single "Religion (U Can Lay Your Hands on Me)". The song was the 60th-best-performing single of 2019 on the Tokio Hot 100.

In a November 2019 interview with The Guardian, former Spice Girls member Melanie C revealed that she has been working on her eighth studio album with Shura.

On 16 March 2020, Shura released the single "elevator girl" featuring the Philadelphia rapper Ivy Sole. She released an alternate version titled "elevator girl (Space Tape Edit)" on 22 May 2020. On 19 July 2023, Shura was featured on the single "Call Me A Lioness", released in celebration of the 2023 FIFA Women's World Cup. The single also featured Olivia Dean, Melanie C, Marika Hackman among others.

Shura released her third studio album, I Got Too Sad for My Friends, via Play It Again Sam, on 30 May 2025.

== Personal life ==
Shura was born in Hammersmith, London, and grew up in Manchester. Her mother is Russian actress Valentina Yakunina and her father is English documentary filmmaker Richard Denton. Her parents divorced when she was three. Shura has two brothers, including a twin, Nicholas, who has starred in three of her music videos: "Touch", "White Light" and "What's It Gonna Be?". She began playing the guitar when she was 13 years old and started recording music at 16. Shura had been a promising footballer in her youth and played for Manchester City from under 11 to under 16 level, despite being a Manchester United fan.

Shura is an out lesbian and an atheist, despite a long-standing fascination with religion. In summer 2014 she experienced a severe panic attack, which she described as "feel[ing] like I [was] dying." Her stage name comes from a short form of her first name in Russian, a language Shura is fluent in.

== Artistry ==
Shura's music has been described as "infectious but melancholy electropop" as well as "slow-burning synth-pop" but has said that pop music "didn't represent" her. The singer has said that "missed opportunity, regret, nostalgia" are some of the main themes in her work. The singer has been described as having a soprano vocal range.

== Awards and nominations ==
Year	Awards	Work	Category	Result	Ref.
2016	Popjustice £20 Music Prize	"What's It Gonna Be?"	Best British Pop Single	Nominated	
2019	Music Producers Guild Awards	Herself	Remixer of the Year	Won	
2019	UK Music Video Awards	"Religion"	Best Pop Video - Newcomer	Nominated	
2019	Best Art Vinyl	Forevher	Best Vinyl Art	Nominated	

== Music videos ==
- "Touch" (2014)
- "Indecision" (2015)
- "2Shy" (2015)
- "White Light" (2015)
- "White Light (Extended Video)" (2015)
- "What's It Gonna Be?" (2016)
- "311215" (2016)
- "BKLYNLDN" (2019)
- "religion (u can lay your hands on me)" (2019)
- "religion (u can lay your hands on me) (Vertical Video)" (2019)
- "obsession" (2021)

== Discography ==
=== Albums ===
Title	Details	Peak chart positions						
Title	Details	UK	BEL (FL)	BEL (WA)	IRE	SCO	SWI	US Heat
Nothing's Real	Released: 8 July 2016; Label: Polydor; Format: CD, LP, digital download	13	73	130	73	15	35	12
Forevher	Released: 16 August 2019; Label: Secretly Canadian; Format: CD, LP, digital download, streaming	61	—	—	—	32	—	18
I Got Too Sad for My Friends	Released: 30 May 2025; Label: PIAS; Format: CD, LP, digital download, streaming	—	—	—	—	90	—	—

=== Singles ===
Title	Year	Peak chart positions		Album
Title	Year	UK	BEL (Vl.)	Album
"Touch"	2014	–	–	Nothing's Real
"Indecision"	2014	– (Note: "Indecision" did not make the main UK Singles Chart, but reached number 37 on the Official Physical Singles Chart.)	–	Nothing's Real
"2Shy"	2015	–	– (Note: "2Shy" failed to crack the main Ultratop 50 chart in Flanders, but reached number 43 on Ultratip, the Ultratop 50's bubbling-under chart.)	Nothing's Real
"White Light"	2015	– (Note: "White Light" did not make the main UK Singles Chart, but reached number 44 on the Official Physical Singles Chart and number 26 on the Official Vinyl Singles Chart.)	– (Note: "Touch" failed to crack the main Ultratop 50 chart in Flanders, but reached number 79 on Ultratip, the Ultratop 50's bubbling-under chart.)	Nothing's Real
"Touch" (re-release featuring Talib Kweli)	2016	– (Note: "Touch" did not make the main UK Singles Chart, but reached number 12 on the Official Physical Singles Chart. Additionally, it was a top-ten hit on the Official Vinyl Singles Chart, peaking at number seven.)	–	Non-album single
"What's It Gonna Be?"	2016	–	–	Nothing's Real
"The Space Tapes"	2016	–	–	Nothing's Real
"311215"	2016	–	–	Nothing's Real
"Nothing's Real"	2016	–	–	Nothing's Real
"Love Theme" (with Tourist)	2019	–	–	Everyday
"Bklynldn"	2019	–	–	Forevher
"Religion (U Can Lay Your Hands on Me)"	2019	–	–	Forevher
"The Stage"	2019	–	–	Forevher
"Elevator Girl" (featuring Ivy Sole)	2020	–	–	Forevher (Deluxe Edition)
"Obsession" (featuring Rosie Lowe)	2021	–	–	Forevher (Deluxe Edition)
"Recognise"	2025	–	–	I Got Too Sad For My Friends
"Richardson" (featuring Cassandra Jenkins)	2025	–	–	I Got Too Sad For My Friends
"World's Worst Girlfriend"	2025	–	–	I Got Too Sad For My Friends

=== Featured appearances ===
- Mura Masa – "Love for That" (2015) (featuring Shura)
- Tracey Thorn – "Air" (2018) (featuring Shura)
- Hope FC – "Call Me a Lioness" (2023) (featuring Olivia Dean, Melanie C, Shura, Marika Hackman, Rachel Chinouriri, Jasmine Jethwa, Rose Gray, Highlyy, Al Greenwood & Self Esteem)
- Sorrow – "1+1" (2013) (featuring Shura)
- Sorrow – "Your Lips Your Soul (Always)" (2016) (featuring CoMa, Shura)
- Sorrow – "Thinking of You" (2016) (featuring Shura)
- Laura Cahen – "Toute l'eau qui coule" (2026) (featuring Shura)

=== Remixes ===
Artist	Song	Year
Jessie Ware	"Say You Love Me"	2014
Pumarosa	"Priestess"	2015
Mabel	"My Boy My Town"	2016
Tegan and Sara	"Boyfriend"	2016
Kiiara	"Gold"	2016
Astrid S	"Breathe"	2017
Aurora	"Queendom"	2018
NIMMO	"It's Easier"	2018
The Undercover Dream Lover	"Tightrope"	2020
Delilah Montagu	"Loud"	2020
Becca Mancari	"Lonely Boy"	2020
Ines Rae	"Never Get It Right"	2021
Saint Sister	"Dynamite"	2023
