= Perfect World (Lastlings album) =

Studio album by Lastlings
- Released: 23 June 2023
- Length: 49:37
- Label: Rose Avenue; Liberation
- Producer: Amy Dowdle; Josh Dowdle; Simon Lam; Emmit Fenn; Alex Metric; Rinzen

Lastlings chronology
First Contact (2020)	Perfect World (2023)

Singles from Perfect World
- 1. "Get What You Want" Released: 21 October 2022; 2. "Holding Me Like Water" Released: 20 January 2023; 3. "Noise" Released: 30 March 2023; 4. "Out My Head" Released: 5 May 2023; 5. "Gravity" Released: 9 June 2023

Perfect World is the second studio album by Australian electronic pop duo Lastlings and was announced in March and released on 23 June 2023. The album became the duo's first Australian top 50 release, debuting at number 39 on the ARIA Charts.

The title for the album is inspired by how everyone has their idea of a perfect world, one where they can have whatever they want. However, as Amy Dowdle explains, life isn't perfect—she describes it as "messy", "hard" and full of "challenges".

At the 2023 ARIA Music Awards, the album was nominated for Best Dance/Electronic Release.

At the 2023 J Awards, the album was nominated for Australian Album of the Year.

== Critical reception ==
Forbes said "The 12-track body of work epitomises art, tradition and determination. The transcendent LP takes audiophiles through enchanting vocals, celestial sounds, classical piano, cinematic beats and dreamy melodies, staying true to Lastlings' philosophy when making music as it strives to create escapist moments that allow listeners to delve into another dimension and use their imagination."

Triple J said "Siblings Amy and Josh have delivered a deeply personal record filled to the brim with hypnotic, euphoric and dance floor ready electro anthems."

== Track listing ==
All tracks are written by Amy and Josh Dowdle.

Perfect World track listing
No.	Title	Length
1.	"Holding Me Like Water"	3:56
2.	"Perfect World"	4:38
3.	"Better Off Without You"	3:40
4.	"Noise"	4:42
5.	"Out My Head"	3:33
6.	"Get What You Want"	4:04
7.	"Let You In"	4:34
8.	"Learning To Love"	4:18
9.	"Gravity"	4:29
10.	"Closer (Interlude)"	1:44
11.	"What Good Am I"	3:52
12.	"Far From Falling"	6:07
Total length:		49:37

== Personnel ==
Lastlings

- Amy Dowdle – writing, vocals, production (1–12)
- Josh Dowdle – writing, vocals, production (1–12)

== Charts ==
Chart performance for Perfect World
Chart (2023)	Peak position
Australian Albums (ARIA)	39
