= Frances (musician) =

British musician (born 1993)

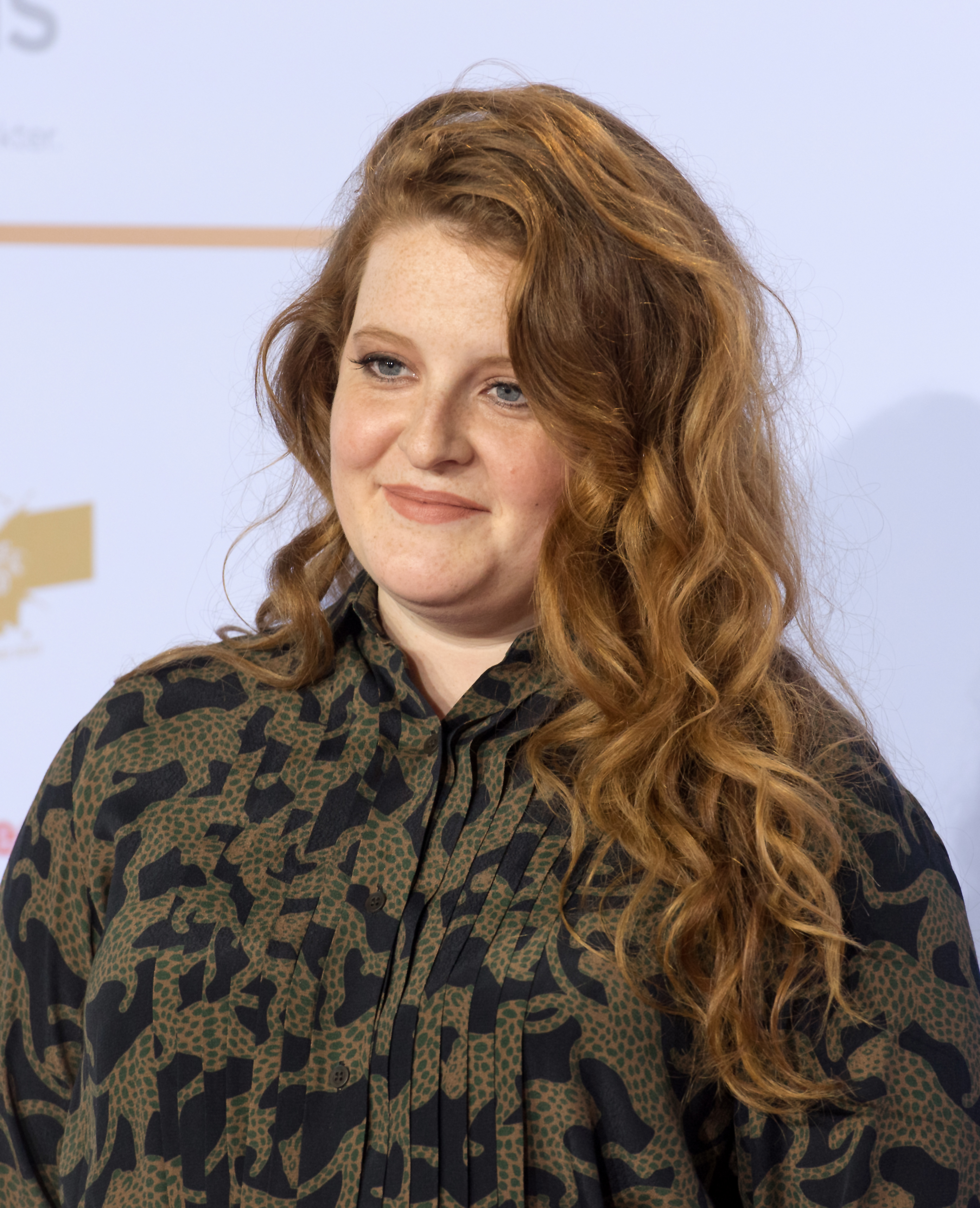
- Frances in 2016

Background information
- Born: Sophie Frances Cooke; 27 June 1993 (age 32); Oxford, England
- Genres: Pop; indie pop; folk; soul
- Occupations: Singer; songwriter
- Instruments: Vocals; piano; violin
- Years active: 2014–present
- Labels: Communion; Capitol
- Website: francesmusic.com

Sophie Frances Cooke (born 27 June 1993), known mononymously as Frances, is a British musician from Newbury, Berkshire, England.

== Early life ==
Born in Oxford, she grew up in Newbury and attended St Gabriel's School in nearby Sandleford. She later studied music at the Liverpool Institute for Performing Arts.

== Career ==
In August 2014, she was the featured artist for the track "Fire May Save You" for the French music label Kitsuné. The single was released as part of an EP, which contained remixes of the same track. In July 2015, she released the EP Grow for Communion Records. In October 2015, she released the EP Let It Out.

In November 2015, she was shortlisted for the 2016 BRIT Awards: Critics' Choice Award. In December 2015, she was nominated for the BBC Sound of 2016.

In 2016, she portrayed Katter the Butterfly singing "In My Life" in Beat Bugs episode 10b.

== Discography ==
=== Studio albums ===
Title	Details	Peak chart positions			
Title	Details	UK	BEL (FL)	BEL (WA)	SCO
Things I've Never Said	Released: 17 March 2017; Label: Capitol; Format: CD, 12" vinyl, digital download	43	33	90	58
Wonder	Released: 9 April 2021; Label: Cookie Records; Format: CD, 12" vinyl, digital download	—	—	—	—

=== Singles ===
Year	Title	Peak chart positions				Album
Year	Title	UK	AUS	BEL (FL)	BEL (WA)	Album
2014	"Fire May Save You"	—	—	—	—	Non-album single
2015	"Grow"	188	—	—	—	Things I've Never Said
2015	"Let It Out"	—	—	—	—	Things I've Never Said
2015	"Borrowed Time"	168	—	70	—	Things I've Never Said
2016	"Don't Worry About Me"	179	83	15	66	Things I've Never Said
2016	"Say It Again"	—	—	—	—	Things I've Never Said
2016	"Under Our Feet"	—	—	—	—	Things I've Never Said
2017	"No Matter"	—	—	77	85	Things I've Never Said
2020	"Eclipse"	—	—	—	—	Wonder
2020	"Other Side of the World"	—	—	—	—	Wonder
2021	"Rare"	—	—	—	—	Wonder
2021	"Ocean in Gold"	—	—	—	—	Wonder

== Songwriting and production discography ==
Year	Artist	Song	Written with	Produced with	Album
2015	SG Lewis	"Warm"	List: Samuel George Lewis	N/A	Non-album single
2015	Jennifer Zamudio	"Layers"	List: Allen McKendree	N/A	15 Jaar Spesiale Uitgawe
2015	Jennifer Zamudio	"Bitter Pill"	List: Allen McKendree Stephen Langstaff	N/A	15 Jaar Spesiale Uitgawe
2016	Karen Harding	"Open My Eyes"	List: Josh Wilkinson James Reynolds	N/A	Non-album single
2016	Lauren Aquilina	"Something So Beautiful"	No additional writers	No additional producers	Mum's List OST
2017	Leo Stannard	"Gravity" feat. Frances	List: Leonard Stannard Neil Ormandy Stephen Solomon	N/A	Maratea
2017	Grey	"Room 101" feat. Frances	List: Michael Trewartha Kyle Trewartha Rachel Furner	N/A	Chameleon EP
2018	SG Lewis	"Coming Up"	List: Samuel George Lewis Finlay Robson	N/A	Dusk EP
2018	SG Lewis	"Sunsets, Pt. II"	List: Samuel George Lewis	N/A	Dusk EP
2018	JC Stewart	"Medicine"	List: John Stewart	List: Geoff Swan	Non-album single
2018	Dan Caplen	"Trouble" feat. Ms Banks	List: Daniel Caplen James Newman Frederik Eichen Thyra Oji	N/A	Non-album single
2018	King Henry	"Bad for Me" feat. Elle Watson	List: Henry Allen Elle Watson	N/A	Non-album single
2018	Joseph Marcus	"Better Love"	List: Joseph Marcus	N/A	Root EP
2018	Jess Glynne	"All I Am"	List: Jessica Glynne Janee Bennett James Newman Bastian Langebaek Sandy Rivera Jayson Sealee	N/A	Always In Between
2018	Sody	"Maybe It Was Me"	N/A	No additional producers	Non-album single
2018	Liv Dawson	"I Like You"	List: Olivia Dawson	No additional producers	Bedroom EP
2018	Sody	"Let You Know"	N/A	No additional producers	Non-album single
2019	SG Lewis	"Blue"	List: Samuel George Lewis Finlay Robson	N/A	Dark EP
2019	Nico Santos	"Welcome Home"	List: Nico Santos Jon Maguire	N/A	Streets of Gold: Unforgettable Edition
2019	The Magician	"Ready to Love"	List: Stephen Fasano Mark Ralph	N/A	Non-album single
2019	Sody	"The Bully"	List: Sophie Dyson	No additional producers	Non-album single
2019	Don Diablo	"Brave" with Jessie J	List: Don Schipper Martijn van Sonderson Jessica Glynne Janee Bennett James Newman Edvard Erfjord Henrik Michelsen	N/A	Non-album single
2019	SG Lewis	"Flames" feat. Ruel	List: Samuel George Lewis Alexander Oriet David Phelan	N/A	Dawn EP
2019	Rozes	"Call Me"	List: Elizabeth Mencel Alexandra Robotham	N/A	Crazy EP
2019	Aaron Smith	"Better Than You Loved Me"	List: Aaron Smith Joseph Rubel	N/A	Loveless EP
2019	Maisie Peters	"This is on You"	List: Maisie Peters	List: Sam Tsang	It's Your Bed Babe, It's Your Funeral
2019	Brandon Colbein	"Mad"	N/A	No additional producers	Non-album single
2019	Sody	"What We Had"	List: Sophie Dyson	No additional producers	I'm Sorry, I'm Not Sorry EP
2020	Meghan Trainor	"Ashes"	List: Meghan Trainor Daniel Gleyzer	N/A	Treat Myself
2020	Meghan Trainor	"Have You Now"	List: Meghan Trainor	N/A	Treat Myself
2020	Sarah Close	"Stay"	List: Sarah Close	No additional producers	And Now, We're Shining EP
2020	Maisie Peters	"Daydreams"	N/A	List: Dan Tashian Ian Fitchuk	Non-album single
2020	Dua Lipa	"Hallucinate"	List: Dua Lipa Samuel George Lewis	N/A	Future Nostalgia
2020	Maisie Peters	"The List"	List: Maisie Peters	List: Rob Milton	Non-album single
2020	Claudia Valentina	"Seven"	List: Claudia Valentina James Newman Joseph Rubel	N/A	Claudia Valentina EP
2020	Holly Humberstone	"Drop Dead"	List: Holly Humberstone Robert Milton	N/A	Falling Asleep at the Wheel EP
2020	Katy Perry	"Only Love"	List: Katheryn Hudson Andrew Jackson	N/A	Smile
2021	SG Lewis	"Heartbreak on the Dancefloor" feat. Frances	List: Samuel George Lewis	N/A	Times
2021	SG Lewis	"Fall"	List: Samuel George Lewis Orlando Higginbottom	N/A	Times
2021	Grace Davies	"I Met a Boy Online"	List: Grace Davies	No additional producers	I Wonder If You Wonder EP
2021	Audien	"Learn to Love Again"	List: Nate Rathbun Henrik Michelsen	N/A	Non-album single
2021	Maisie Peters	"Happy Hunting Ground" feat. Griff	List: Maisie Peters Sarah Griffiths	List: Joe Rubel	Trying: Season 2 OST
2021	Twice	"First Time"	List: Park Ji-hyo Jade Thirlwall George Tizzard Richard Parkhouse	N/A	Taste of Love EP
2021	Rudimental	"Straight from the Heart" feat. Nørskov	List: Amir Izadkhah Piers Aggett Kesi Dryden Leon Rolle Morgan Connie-Smith Olivia Devine James Newman Steven Mead Daniel Langsman	N/A	Ground Control
2021	Maisie Peters	"You Signed Up for This"	List: Maisie Peters Joseph Rubel	N/A	You Signed Up for This
2021	Maisie Peters	"Brooklyn"	List: Maisie Peters	No additional producers	You Signed Up for This
2021	Maisie Peters	"Tough Act"	List: Maisie Peters Joseph Rubel	N/A	You Signed Up for This
2021	Hybrid Minds	"Blame You" feat. Dylan	List: Matthew Rowe Joshua White Holly Humberstone	N/A	Non-album single
2021	Elton John	"Orbit" with SG Lewis	List: Elton John Samuel George Lewis	N/A	The Lockdown Sessions
2021	Grace Davies	"Somebody"	List: Grace Davies Janee Bennett	List: Grace Davies Marcus Andersson	I Wonder If You Wonder EP

== Awards and nominations ==
Year	Organisation	Award	Result
2016	BRIT Awards	Critic's Choice	Nominated
2016	BBC	Sound of...2016	Nominated
