= Estrus (album) =

Studio album by Tove Lo
- Released: 18 September 2026
- Studios: House Mouse (Stockholm); MXM (Los Angeles); Perikles (Torekov); Mosaert Label (Brussels)
- Length: 32:28
- Label: Pretty Swede
- Producers: A Strut; Elvira; Oscar Görres; Oscar Holter; Luka Kloser; TimFromTheHouse

Tove Lo chronology
Heat (2024)	Estrus (2026)

Singles from Estrus
- 1. "I'm Your Girl Right?" Released: 13 May 2026; 2. "Des fleurs" Released: 12 June 2026; 3. "DNH" Released: 29 July 2026

Estrus is the sixth studio album by the Swedish singer Tove Lo. It was released on 18 September 2026, through her independent record label, Pretty Swede Records.

== Background and development ==
Estrus was recorded across sessions in Los Angeles, Stockholm, and a small Swedish village where Lo spent part of her childhood. During the album's early development in late 2024, she struggled to write material that felt authentic, explaining that she was "in the middle of some kind of personal metamorphosis" and found it difficult to express herself creatively. She later resumed her work on the project in the secluded Swedish village with producer Ludvig Söderberg, where they worked without distractions and began shaping the album's direction.

"Estrus is an animal in heat. It's primal, contradicting emotional chaos. It's my mind and my body wanting different things, wanting everything."

— Lo, about the album's name Estrus

The title of Estrus derives from the biological term for a reproductive cycle in mammals, which she used to frame the record's instinctive and feminine perspective. Lo described Estrus's concept as being driven by conflicting emotional and physical desires, and added that the album offers "a lot of feelings, no solutions". She created the project primarily with collaborators, including Söderberg, Elvira Anderfjärd, and Luka Kloser, while Belgian musician Stromae appears as a featured artist.

== Promotion ==
Lo announced her sixth studio album, Estrus, on 11 May 2026, sharing its cover artwork and track listing. Same day, she also unveiled its lead single, "I'm Your Girl Right?"; it was released on 13 May along with its Nogari-directed music video that was filmed in São Paulo with 70 dancers. In support of the album, she will embark on its accompanying tour, which is set to began on September 15 in Nashville at the Pinnacle and conclude on November 19 at Avicii Arena. Mallrat (North America), Rose Gray (UK and Europe), and Cobrah (Brooklyn) will serve as a supporting act of the tour. (Note: Attributed to multiple sources)

She released "Des fleurs", with Stromae, on 12 June 2026.

"DNH" was released as the third single off the album on July 29, 2026.

== Critical reception ==
Professional ratings
Aggregate scores
Source	Rating
Metacritic	74/100
Review scores
Source	Rating
AllMusic	3.5/5 stars
Beats Per Minute	8/10
Clash	7/10
MusicOMH	4/5 stars
Pitchfork	7.0/10
Slant Magazine	3.5/5 stars

Estrus received positive reviews from contemporary music critics. At Metacritic, which assigns a normalized rating out of 100 to reviews from mainstream critics, the album has an average score of 74 based on 6 reviews, indicating "generally favorable reviews".

AllMusic's Heather Phares writes that, "Despite her [Lo's] personal changes, Estrus doubles down on everything that defines her music. Lo makes a full return to the dance floor after Dirt Femme, fueling the album's beats with lust, jealousy, and self-doubt.", however adds that "[Estrus] isn't as decisive as her best work, Lo is still an expert at chronicling messy, vulnerable, defiant femininity -- and at making complicated feelings catchy."

Writing for Beats Per Minute, Mary Chiney praised the album and called it "the most grown-up record she [Tove] has made". She criticised however the length of the album calling it a "limitation" and something that causes "a certain unwillingness to finish thoughts."

Phil Taylor of Clash writes that the "songwriting is top class on almost all of this album’s tracks" yet pointes out that some of the tracks feel like they were "little less considered" than the others."

Michael Savio from Slant Magazine named Estrus "frenzied emotional terrain [that] can occasionally leave one feeling a little cold." Pitchfork's Aimee Cliff lamented that "Estrus doesn’t always sound as liberated or unexpected as that description promises."

== Track listing ==
Estrus track listing
No.	Title	Writer(s)	Producer(s)	Length
1.	"A Lot of Feelings, No Solutions"	Tove Lo; Ludvig Söderberg	A Strut	0:50
2.	"I'm Your Girl Right?"	Lo; Söderberg	A Strut	2:49
3.	"If I Could I Would"	Lo; Söderberg	A Strut	2:07
4.	"Des fleurs" (with Stromae)	Lo; Paul van Haver	A Strut; Oscar Görres; Stromae	2:52
5.	"DNH"	Lo; Söderberg; Tim Nelson	A Strut; TimFromTheHouse; Oscar Holter	2:27
6.	"F.A.M.T"	Lo; Tove Burman; Luka Kloser; Elvira Anderfjärd	Elvira; Kloser	3:13
7.	"I'm the Cake"	Lo; Oscar Görres	Görres	2:18
8.	"The Bad One"	Lo; Söderberg	A Strut	2:54
9.	"Die for My Art with a Lonely Heart"	Lo; Söderberg; Nelson	A Strut; TimFromTheHouse	2:33
10.	"Are We on a Break"	Lo; Madelene Eliasson; Johan Salomonsson; Söderberg; Nelson	A Strut; TimFromTheHouse	3:13
11.	"Idiot"	Lo; Tailtiu Ní Mhuirí; Söderberg	A Strut; Lo^{[c]}	2:49
12.	"Roomie"	Lo; Charlie Twaddle; Söderberg	A Strut	2:12
13.	"Source of Life"	Lo; Söderberg	A Strut	2:11
Total length:				32:28

=== Notes ===
- ^{^[c]} signifies a co-producer.
- "Des fleurs" is stylised as "des fleurs x stromae".
- All songs are stylized in lower case, except the word "I" and the initial letters.

== Personnel ==
Credits are adapted from Tidal.

- Tove Lo – vocals, background vocals
- Alex Ghenea – mixing
- Jack Normile – mixing assistance
- Randy Merrill – mastering
- A Strut – bass guitar, drums, keyboards, programming (1–3, 5, 8–13)
- Jeremy Lertola – engineering (1–3, 5, 8–13)
- Johan Malmberg Hector – guitar (2), bass guitar (13)
- Shellback – drums (2)
- Max Grahn – guitar (3)
- Oscar Görres – bass guitar, drums, keyboards, programming, engineering (4, 7); guitar (7)
- Stromae – vocals, background vocals, bass guitar, keyboards, programming (4)
- TimFromTheHouse – bass guitar, drums, keyboards, programming (5, 9, 10)
- Oscar Holter – bass guitar, drums, keyboards, programming (5)
- Elvira Anderfjärd – background vocals, bass guitar, drums, keyboards, programming, engineering (6)
- Luka Kloser – background vocals, bass guitar, drums, keyboards, programming, engineering (6)
- Tove Burman – background vocals (6)
- Johan Salmonsson – background vocals (10)
- Tailtiu – bass guitar, drums, keyboards, programming (11)
- Charlie Twaddle – background vocals (12)

== Charts ==
Chart performance
Chart (2026)	Peak position
Australian Albums (ARIA)	32
Belgian Albums (Ultratop Flanders)	107
Belgian Albums (Ultratop Wallonia)	31
French Albums (SNEP)	84
German Albums (Offizielle Top 100)	89
Irish Independent Albums (IRMA)	27
Portuguese Streaming Albums (AFP)	200
Scottish Albums (Official Charts)	13
Swedish Albums (Sverigetopplistan)	13
Swiss Albums (Schweizer Hitparade)	79
UK Albums (Official Charts)	63
UK Independent Albums (Official Charts)	9
US Billboard 200	184
US Independent Albums (Billboard)	24
US Top Dance Albums (Billboard)	5

== Release history ==
Release dates and formats
Region	Date	Format(s)	Label(s)	Ref.
Various	18 September 2026	CD; digital download; LP; streaming	Pretty Swede	
