= Ivy Sole =

American rapper

- Born: Taylor C. McLendon; 1995 (age 30–31); Charlotte, North Carolina, U.S.
- Origin: Philadelphia, Pennsylvania, U.S.
- Genres: Hip hop; boom bap; jazz rap; neo soul
- Occupations: Rapper; producer
- Years active: 2016–present
- Label: Les fleurs
- Website: ivysole.com

Taylor C. McLendon (born 1995), known professionally as Ivy Sole, is an American rapper and record producer from Philadelphia. Ivy Sole has been a member of Indigold, Liberal Art, and Third Eye Optiks. Ivy Sole has been mentioned as an example of the growing movement of non-binary artists.

== Early life ==
McLendon grew up queer in a Southern Baptist Church and received all of their vocal training in a church setting. McLendon was raised in a predominantly black neighborhood, but attended a predominantly white magnet school.

A week after their 18th birthday, McLendon attended a Mac Miller concert featuring Rapsody and Nicki Minaj, which they cite as their inspiration for pursuing a musical career.

== Career ==
Ivy Sole began their musical career by joining three different collaborations called Indigold, Liberal Art, and Third Eye Optiks.

In 2016, Ivy Sole began their solo career with the debut mixtape entitled Eden, which would be followed by the extended plays West and then East. NPR noted that Ivy Sole tackles mental health issues in their music video for the track entitled "Life" off of the extended play East.

In 2018, Ivy Sole released their debut full-length album entitled Overgrown. Pitchfork did a review of the track entitled "Achilles" off of the album Overgrown.

In 2020, a live recording of Overgrown entitled Overgrown* (Live from Philadelphia) was released.

== Personal life ==
McLendon moved to Philadelphia in 2011 to attend the Wharton School of the University of Pennsylvania. They graduated in 2015 with a degree in business.

Describing their sexual orientation to Billboard, McLendon stated: "I like women and I like men. I like women a lot though. Women have me on my ass, which is rare — I feel like I'm a very calm and collected person." McLendon is non-binary and uses they/them pronouns.

== Discography ==
=== Studio albums ===
- Eden (2016)
- Overgrown (2018)
- Candid (2022)

=== Live albums ===
- Overgrown* (Live from Philadelphia) (2020)

=== Extended plays ===
- West (2017)
- East (2017)
- SOUTHPAW (2020)

=== Singles ===
- "Backwoods" (2018)
- "Rollercoaster" (2018)
- "Life" (feat. Dave B) (2016)

=== Guest appearances ===
- Cro – "fake you." from tru (2017)
- Franky Hill – "Lies" from User (2018)
- B4bonah – "4 U" from B4Beginning (2019)
- Hadji Gaviota – "tHAt SiNkiNg feeliNg..." from ANCHORS (2019)
- Myles Cream – "Peace" from Grillo (2019)
- Charles Fauna – "Listen" from Yonder (2020)
- Birthh – "Ultraviolet" from WHOA (2020)
- Blossom – "Sass (sowle Remix)" from Sass (sowle Remix) (2020)
- Pool Cosby – "Day Breaks" from Day Breaks (2020)
- Shura – "elevator girl" from elevator girl (2020)

== Concert tours ==
- The Femmetape Summer Tour
