= Heat (SG Lewis and Tove Lo EP) =

EP by SG Lewis and Tove Lo
- Released: 14 June 2024
- Length: 15:31
- Label: Pretty Swede
- Producer: SG Lewis; Totally Enormous Extinct Dinosaurs

SG Lewis chronology
AudioLust & HigherLove (2023)	Heat (2024)	Anemoia (2025)

Tove Lo chronology
Dirt Femme (2022)	Heat (2024)	Estrus (2026)

Singles from Heat
- 1. "Heat" Released: 14 June 2024

Heat is a collaborative extended play by English musician SG Lewis and Swedish singer-songwriter Tove Lo released on 14 June 2024, through Lo's independent label Pretty Swede Records. The EP is Lewis's sixth and Lo's third.

== Background ==
SG Lewis and Tove Lo first began collaborating on music for Lo's fifth studio album Dirt Femme. This resulted in the songs "Call On Me" and "Pineapple Slice" when the album released in fall 2022. "Call On Me" was released as the third promotional single for the album and was included on Lewis's second album AudioLust & HigherLove in 2023. Both continued working on songs following this and created most of them quickly before spending "nearly a year" tweaking them. They also enlisted the help of Totally Enormous Extinct Dinosaurs for additional writing and production. They planned for the EP to be a casual side project, but it took on a much larger role and effort.

The duo began teasing the collaborative EP in January and February 2024, along with a collaboration with Canadian singer-songwriter Nelly Furtado. This collaboration became the lead single "Love Bites" from Furtado's album 7.

== Release and promotion ==
On 4 June 2024, they officially announced the EP with a release date set for ten days later. Along with the EP release on 14 June the title track was released as the lead single and an 18+ music video featuring drag queens, clubbing, and queer people. The video was directed by David Wilson, with videos for the other three tracks being released following. Lewis and Lo only appear in the first video, with Lo saying they were "trying to highlight other people and the queer community more than ourselves in the videos". Lewis described each video as representing "different pockets of a night out". The videos were filmed at Electrowerkz in London during the first Club Heat event.

They promoted the EP with a series of "Club Heat" pop-up performances. They feature both artist DJing back to back along with Lo popping out for occasional vocal and dance performances. The first Club Heat was held at Electrowerkz in London on 9 May. The second, which also served as the launch party for the EP, was held on 13 June at Heart WeHo in West Hollywood. Further Club Heat events were held at Glastonbury Festival on 28 June, at 3 Dollar Bill in Brooklyn on 8 August, and a show at the Boiler Room in San Francisco as a part of Portola Festival on 27 September.

== Track listing ==
All lyrics are written by Tove Lo. All tracks are produced by SG Lewis and Totally Enormous Extinct Dinosaurs, except "Desire" (produced by Lewis).

Heat track listing
No.	Title	Music	Length
1.	"Heat"	Samuel George Lewis; Tove Nilsson; Orlando Higginbottom	3:37
2.	"Let Me Go Oh Oh"	Lewis; Nilsson; Higginbottom	3:58
3.	"Busy Girl"	Lewis; Nilsson; Higginbottom	2:22
4.	"Desire"	Lewis; Nilsson	5:34
Total length:			15:31

Notes

- "Heat" is stylized in all caps.
- "Let Me Go Oh Oh" is stylized as "Let me go OH OH".

== Personnel ==
- SG Lewis – production, programming, synthesizer (all tracks); drums (tracks 1–3)
- Tove Lo – lead vocals, background vocals
- Totally Enormous Extinct Dinosaurs – production, drums, programming, synthesizer (tracks 1–3)
- Chris Gehringer – mastering
- Nathan Boddy – mixing
- Lilian Nuthall – mixing assistance

== Charts ==
Chart performance for Heat
Chart (2024–2025)	Peak position
US Top Current Album Sales (Billboard)	47
US Top Dance Albums (Billboard)	15

== Release history ==
Release history and formats for Heat
Region	Date	Format(s)	Label	Ref.
Various	14 June 2024	digital download; streaming	Pretty Swede	
