= Channel Tres =

American rapper and record producer (born 1991)

- Born: Sheldon Jerome Young; May 26, 1991 (age 35); Compton, California, U.S.
- Genres: Hip house; experimental hip hop; West Coast hip hop
- Occupations: Rapper; disc-jockey; singer; songwriter; producer
- Instruments: Vocals; guitar; keyboard
- Years active: 2017–present
- Label: Godmode
- Website: www.channeltres.net

Sheldon Jerome Young (born May 26, 1991), known professionally as Channel Tres, is an American rapper, DJ, singer and record producer from Compton, California. Tres is best known for his singles "Controller" and "Topdown".

== Early life and education ==
Young grew up in southern Los Angeles, between Compton and Lynwood. He was raised by his great-grandparents. He spent most days at church, where he played drums for the choir. Channel left home to study music at Oral Roberts University, a private Christian university in Tulsa, Oklahoma.

== Career ==
Upon his return to Los Angeles, a childhood friend (88rising artist August 08) brought him along to studio sessions, where he rose to making beats for Duckwrth, Wale, Kehlani and others.

In 2018 "Controller" received airplay on BBC Radio 1, and an Essential New Tune call-out from Pete Tong. Australian radio station Triple J added "Controller" to their A-list rotation and called it "one of 2018's biggest cult hits." Channel Tres continued to see success with the release of his self-titled EP in 2018 and further singles, including his single "Black Moses", which featured JPEGMAFIA. He played his first headline shows in the US in 2019.

== Discography ==
=== Studio albums ===
List of studio albums, with release date, label, and formats shown
Title	Studio album details
Head Rush	Released: June 28, 2024; Label: RCA; Formats: Digital download, streaming
Enigma POV	Released: August 14, 2026; Label: Alta; Formats: Digital download, streaming

=== Extended plays ===
List of EPs, with release date, label and formats shown
Title	EP details
Channel Tres	Released: 27 July 2018; Label: Godmode; Formats: Digital download, streaming
Black Moses	Released: 16 August 2019; Label: Godmode; Formats: Digital download, streaming
I Can't Go Outside	Released: 11 December 2020; Label: Art for Their Good; Formats: Digital download, streaming
refresh	Released: March 2, 2022; Label: Art for Their Good; Formats: Digital download, streaming
Acid / Ganzfeld 12"	Released: March 25, 2022; Label: Godmode; Formats: Digital download, streaming
Real Cultural Shit	Released: February 24, 2023; Label: Godmode; Formats: Digital download, streaming

=== Singles ===
==== As lead artist ====
List of singles as lead artist, with year released, selected chart positions, and album details shown
Title	Year	Peak chart positions		Album
Title	Year	US Dance Club	US Dance	Album
"Controller"	2018	—	—	Channel Tres
"Jet Black"	2018	—	—	Channel Tres
"Glide"	2018	—	—	Channel Tres
"Brilliant Nigga"	2019	—	—	Black Moses
"Sexy Black Timberlake"	2019	—	—	Black Moses
"Black Moses" (featuring JPEGMafia)	2019	—	—	Black Moses
"Ready to Go" (with Baauer and Danny Brown)	2019	—	—	Non-album singles
"Weedman"	2020	—	—	Non-album singles
"Impact" (with SG Lewis and Robyn)	2020	25	—	Times
"Skate Depot"	2020	—	—	I Can't Go Outside
"Fuego" (featuring Tyler, the Creator)	2020	—	—	I Can't Go Outside
"Recap" (with Kito and VanJess)	2021	—	32	Blossom
"Palms" (with Gus Dapperton)	2021	—	—	Orca (Deluxe)
"Hollaback Bitch" (with Mura Masa and Shygirl)	2022	—	—	Demon Time
"Just Can't Get Enough"	2022	—	—	Real Cultural Shit
"No Limit"	2022	—	—	Real Cultural Shit
"6am"	2022	—	—	Real Cultural Shit
"Fever Dreamer" (featuring SG Lewis and Charlotte Day Wilson)	2023	—	—	AudioLust & HigherLove
"Fashion Week" (with Barney Bones)	2023	—	—	Escapism
"Got Time for Me" (with Jamie Jones)	2023	—	—	Non-album single
"Walked in the Room"	2023	—	—	Head Rush
"Candy Paint" (featuring Thundercat)	2024	—	—	Head Rush
"Medicine"	2026	—	—	Enigma POV
"Pop Pop"	2026	—	—	Enigma POV
"Black Techno Guy"	2026	—	—	Enigma POV
"Creatine"	2026	—	—	Enigma POV
"Only One"	2026	—	—	Enigma POV
"—" denotes a recording that did not chart or was not released in that territory.

==== As featured artist ====
List of singles as featured artist, with year released and album setails shown
Title	Year	Album
"Throwyoassout" (Duckwrth featuring Channel Tres)	2020	
"All That" (Emotional Oranges featuring Channel Tres)	2020	The Juicebox
"Tunnel" (Polo & Pan featuring Channel Tres)	2021	Cyclorama
"Lights Up" (Flight Facilities featuring Channel Tres)	2021	Forever
"Wonder" (Yung Bae featuring Channel Tres)	2021	Groove Continental: Side A
"Naked" (Tokimonsta featuring Channel Tres)	2021	Non-album singles
"Bad Girl" (A16Z featuring Channel Tres and omgkirby)	2022	Non-album singles
"HMU for a Good Time" (Tinashe featuring Channel Tres)	2022	333 (Deluxe)
"I've Been in Love" (Jungle featuring Channel Tres)	2023	Volcano
"Don't Call Me" (August 08 featuring Channel Tres)	2024	Pretend It's Okay
"Fantasy" (Jade featuring Channel Tres)	2024	Non-album single

=== Other charted songs ===
List of non-single chart appearances, with year released, selected chart positions, and album details shown
Title	Year	Peak chart positions	Album
Title	Year	US Elec	Album
"Lavender" (Disclosure featuring Channel Tres)	2020	44	Energy

=== Guest appearances ===
List of guest appearances, with title, year released, and album details shown
Title	Year	Album
"Delete Forver (Channel Tres Remix)" (Grimes featuring Channel Tres)	2021	Miss Anthropocene (Rave Edition)
"How Does It Feel" (Zhu featuring Channel Tres)	2021	Dreamland 2021
"Alter Ego" (Duke Dumont featuring Channel Tres)	2021	For Club Play Only, Pt. 7
"A Tulip with No Shadow Blossoms" (AOI featuring Channel Tres)	2021	Four Seasons of AOI
"Tapped" (Terrace Martin featuring Celeste and Channel Tres)	2021	Drones
"Fix Vision" (Kyle Dion featuring Channel Tres)	2022	Sassy (Deluxe)
"Attention Whore" (Tove Lo featuring Channel Tres)	2022	Dirt Femme
"Show Me Some Love" (Honey Dijon featuring Sadie Walker and Channel Tres)	2022	Black Girl Magic
"Who You Are" (Dahi featuring Vince Staples, Channel Tres, and French Anthony)	2026	Black Boy (Alternative)

=== Remixes ===
List of remixes, with year released and artist shown
Title	Year	Artist(s)
"Tangerine"	2018	Aaron Childs
"Why Her Not Me"	2018	Grace Carter
"Stay Safe"	2018	Rhye
"Project Redo"	2018	Winston Surfshirt
"The End"	2018	DMA's
"Earfquake"	2019	Tyler, the Creator
"Blood On My Hands"	2019	August 08 featuring Smino
"Summer Fade"	2019	Snakehips featuring Anna of the North
"Late Night Feelings"	2019	Mark Ronson featuring Lykke Li
"Hit the Back"	2020	King Princess
"Gimme Love"	2020	Joji
"I Did It"	2020	Kris Yute
