= SG Lewis =

British musician (born 1994)

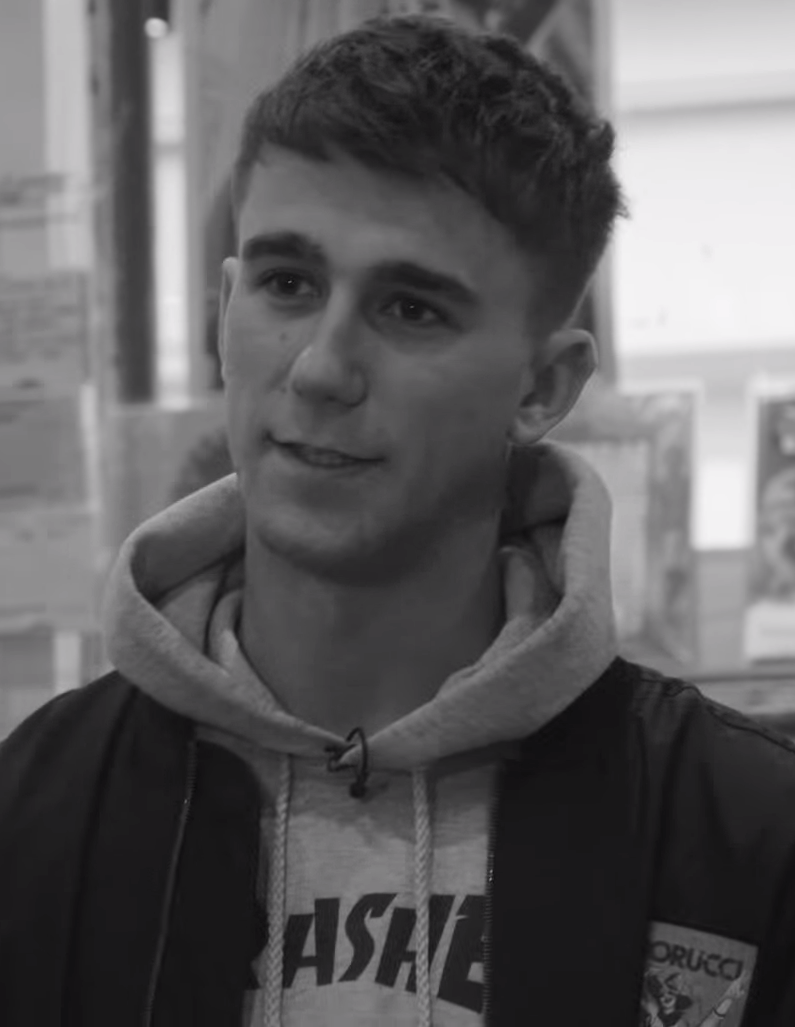
- SG Lewis being interviewed by MTV on Record Store Day, April 2018
- Born: Samuel George Lewis; 9 July 1994 (age 32); Reading, Berkshire, England
- Citizenship: British
- Occupations: Singer-songwriter; record producer; instrumentalist
- Years active: 2014–present
- Musical career
- Genres: Deep house; synth-pop; funk; electronic; alternative R&B
- Instruments: Vocals; electric guitar; keyboards; bass; drums
- Labels: Universal Records; PMR Records; Virgin EMI Records; Republic Records; Forever Days Recordings
- Website: sglewismusic.com

Samuel George Lewis (born 9 July 1994) is an English singer-songwriter, musician, and record producer. He is known for collaborating with artists including Tove Lo, Robyn, Dua Lipa, Nelly Furtado, Mabel, Victoria Monét, Lucky Daye, Jessie Ware, JP Cooper, Raye, Bruno Major, Ray BLK, Frances, Clairo, and LANY.

== Career ==
=== 2014–2016: Career beginnings ===
A native of Reading, England, Lewis first became interested in music in his teens and played in several bands before experimenting with remixing tracks. Influenced by the introspective pop of Bon Iver and James Blake, as well as the club-ready hip-hop of artists including Common, Timbaland, and The Neptunes, Lewis began posting his own evocative, moody tracks online. He quickly built a loyal following and eventually secured a residency DJing at Liverpool's Chibuku Club. He said, "Being a resident DJ at Chibuku in Liverpool was fundamental. It allowed me to spend a lot of time behind the decks and see a different top DJ every week. Genre-wise, Chibuku has had everything: house, dubstep, techno, drum 'n' bass. The first night I went to, Ben Klock was playing downstairs and Andy C upstairs. There aren't many places in the world where you'd get those two on the same line-up. You have this new wave of electronic producers who are largely SoundCloud-based, making electronic music without any thought to the club. That's great. But there's so much to be learned from the old-school approach of resident DJing."

In 2014, Lewis signed his debut record deal with PMR Records, who is home to Jessie Ware, Disclosure, and other artists. He was exhilarated and said, "I spent every day of the summer in my bedroom writing a load of music. My friend Grant had started managing me, and he was meeting a load of people in London. My music got sent round by some A&R's, who passed it on to the PMR guys. PMR Records was one of my favourite labels at the time, so when they called us in for a meeting I was so excited. I had no idea they were interested in signing me, but after one meeting and playing everything I had, they decided to sign me straight away!" After being signed, he grabbed the attention of Disclosure and they invited him to play at a 2,000-year-old castle in Ibiza (Ibiza, Spain) with them.

In 2015, he released his debut extended play, entitled Shivers featuring guest appearances from Louis Mattrs and JP Cooper. In 2016, he released a second extended play entitled Yours with "Yours", a lead single and title track. "Yours" has un-credited vocals from the rising singer-songwriter Raye. Lewis collaborated on songs with Howard Lawrence and Gallant.

=== 2017–2019: Dusk, Dark and Dawn ===
Throughout 2017, Lewis released singles and was shown to Virgin EMI Records to which he later signed. In 2018, he announced that he was working on his debut album, which was set to be released in three parts or extended plays–later announced as Dusk, Dark and Dawn. The project's lead single and first song to be released from Dusk was revealed, entitled "Aura", featuring vocals from J Warner. "Aura" came out on 18 January 2018. Soon "Coming Up" was released as its second single. Dusk was released on 6 April 2018.

Later in 2018 he recorded two breakthrough collaborations in Los Angeles,"Better", with Clairo at the time a DIY producer and now a recording artist from Massachusetts, and "Hurting" featuring British dance music duo AlunaGeorge. "Better" was described by Clairo as "one of the first big steps [she's] made into pop music" and also one of her first proper collaborations with another artist. The song was also praised when it was named Clara Amfo's "Track of the Week". As well as being played across Radio 1, 1xtra and Beats1, the track reached the number one spot on the iTunes Electronic Chart. Prior to the release of Dark, SG Lewis released two more songs called "A.A.T.", featuring Drew Love, and "Again", featuring Totally Enormous Extinct Dinosaurs (TEED). Dark was eventually released on 9 November 2018 with additional collaborations (affiliate Bruno Major and Dot Major [now London Grammar).

In 2019, Lewis released the first single, entitled "Blue", from the third and supposedly last phase of his debut album Dawn. The second single from Dawn, entitled "Throwaway", was released as the second collaborative track between Lewis and Clairo, after "Better". Lewis said about the song, "Clairo is one of my favourite artists to work with, and a good friend of mine...Throwaway was written in LA one evening–we were both super tired and had some s_ going on in our respective personal lives. We sat and talked for ages, and after that Throwaway flowed out in no time at all. Clairo is such a special artist and an incredible songwriter, and I'm super proud of this song."

Later in 2019, he made his second appearance at Coachella in April, where he performed alongside AlunaGeorge and Col3trane, among others. He also teased an unreleased track with Australian singer Ruel, which was announced as the third track from Dawn. It was later revealed that it would be called "Flames" and then released on 10 May 2019. Lewis said about the song, "I was put onto Ruel's music about 18th months ago, and watching his growth since then has been amazing. He's got such soul to his voice for someone of his age, it's crazy. "Flames" is the final preview of Dawn before the whole thing drops, and I can't wait to share the whole thing." He announced that he would perform at Dreamland Margate in Kent, England in June of 2019 and at Printworks in London on 1 February 2020, making it his biggest headline show to date.

=== 2020-2023: Times and AudioLust & HigherLove ===
Lewis' debut album, Times, was released on 19 February 2021. In the fall of 2021, he embarked on a North American tour to promote his upcoming album. His second album AudioLust & HigherLove was released on January 27, 2023. He performed at the 22nd Coachella Valley Music and Arts Festival in Indio, California in April 2023. He launched his own record label, Forever Days Recordings on February 21, 2024 with the goal of creating a space to release "music strictly for the dance floor".

=== 2024-present: Heat and Anemoia ===
In 2024, Lewis released a collaborative extended play with swedish singer and songwriter Tove Lo, titled Heat. In 2025, he released his third studio album Anemoia on September 5. Lewis is set to embark on an upcoming tour titled, Anemoia Live Tour to promote the record.

In March 2025, it was announced that Lewis collaborated with Swedish producer DJ Seinfeld on the track "Something That I've Never Known." The song is featured on DJ Seinfeld's album If This Is It, scheduled for release in June 2026 via Ninja Tune.

== Discography ==
=== Studio albums ===
Title	Details	Peak chart positions			
Title	Details	UK	UK Dance	SCO	US Dance/ Elec.
Times	Released: 19 February 2021; Label: Virgin EMI Records, PMR Records; Format: Digital download, streaming, CD, LP, cassette	46	1	31	11
AudioLust & HigherLove	Released: 27 January 2023; Label: Universal, EMI, PMR, Astralwerks; Format: Digital download, streaming, CD, LP	—	—	99	13
Anemoia	Release date: 5 September 2025; Label: Universal Records, Forever Days Recordings, Positiva, PMR; Format: Digital download, streaming, LP	— (Note: Anemoia did not enter the UK Albums Chart, but debuted at number 81 on the UK Album Downloads Chart.)	2	—	—

=== Extended plays ===
Title	Details	Peak chart positions
Title	Details	US Dance/ Elec.
Shivers	Released: 4 September 2015; Label: PMR; Format: Digital download	9
Yours	Released: 18 August 2016; Label: PMR; Format: Digital download	—
Dusk	Released: 6 April 2018; Label: Virgin EMI, PMR; Format: Digital download	—
Dark	Released: 9 November 2018; Label: Virgin EMI, PMR; Format: Digital download	—
Dawn	Released: 21 June 2019; Label: Casablanca Records, Republic Records; Format: Digital download	—
Heat (with Tove Lo)	Released: 14 June 2024; Label: Pretty Swede; Format: Digital download, streaming	15

=== Singles ===
==== As lead artist ====
List of singles, with year released, selected chart positions, and album name shown
Title	Year	Peak chart positions										Album
Title	Year	UK Down	UK Phy.	UK Sales	UK Vinyl	CAN CHR	GER Down.	NZ Hot	SWE	US Dance/ Elec.	US Dance Air.	Album
"Warm"	2015	—	—	—	—	—	—	—	—	39	—	Shivers EP
"No Less" (featuring Louis Mattrs)	2015	—	—	—	—	—	—	—	—	—	—	Shivers EP
"Shivers" (featuring JP Cooper)	2015	—	—	—	—	—	—	—	—	—	—	Shivers EP
"All Night" (featuring Dornik)	2016	—	—	—	—	—	—	—	—	—	—	Non-album single
"Yours"	2016	—	34	—	23	—	—	—	—	—	—	Yours EP
"Holding Back" (featuring Gallant)	2016	—	—	—	—	—	—	—	—	—	—	Yours EP
"Meant to Be"	2016	—	—	—	—	—	—	—	—	—	—	Yours EP
"Times We Had" (featuring Toulouse)	2017	—	—	—	—	—	—	—	—	—	—	Non-album singles
"Smart Aleck Kill" (with Col3trane)	2017	—	—	—	—	—	—	—	—	—	—	Non-album singles
"Aura" (featuring J Warner)	2018	—	—	—	—	—	—	—	—	—	—	Dusk EP
"Coming Up"	2018	—	—	—	—	—	—	—	—	—	—	Dusk EP
"Better" (with Clairo)	2018	—	—	—	—	—	—	—	—	31	—	8pm EP
"Hurting" (featuring AlunaGeorge)	2018	—	—	—	—	—	—	—	—	42	9	Dark EP
"A.A.T." (featuring Drew Love)	2018	—	—	—	—	—	—	—	—	—	—	Dark EP
"Again" (featuring Totally Enormous Extinct Dinosaurs)	2018	—	—	—	—	—	—	—	—	—	—	Dark EP
"Blue"	2019	—	—	—	—	—	—	—	—	—	—	Dawn EP
"Throwaway" (with Clairo)	2019	—	—	—	—	—	—	29	—	45	—	Dawn EP
"Flames" (featuring Ruel)	2019	—	—	—	—	—	—	35	—	—	—	Dawn EP
"Chemicals"	2020	—	18	—	14	—	—	—	—	27	—	Times
"Impact" (with Robyn and Channel Tres)	2020	—	—	—	—	—	—	—	—	25	—	Times
"Feed the Fire" (with Lucky Daye)	2020	—	—	—	—	—	—	—	—	32	—	Times
"Time" (with Rhye)	2020	—	—	—	—	—	—	—	—	42	—	Times
"One More" (featuring Nile Rodgers)	2021	—	—	—	—	—	—	—	—	31	—	Times
"Missing You"	2022	—	—	—	—	—	—	—	—	—	—	AudioLust & HigherLove
"Something About Your Love"	2022	—	—	—	—	—	—	—	—	—	—	AudioLust & HigherLove
"Vibe Like This" (featuring Lucky Daye and Ty Dolla Sign)	2022	—	—	—	—	—	—	—	—	31	—	AudioLust & HigherLove
"Infatuation"	2022	—	—	—	—	—	—	—	—	—	—	AudioLust & HigherLove
"Call on Me" (Note: "Call on Me" is also included on Tove Lo's fifth studio album Dirt Femme.) (with Tove Lo)	2022	—	—	—	—	—	—	—	—	27	—	AudioLust & HigherLove
"Lifetime"	2022	—	—	—	—	—	—	—	—	—	—	AudioLust & HigherLove
"Fever Dreamer" (featuring Charlotte Day Wilson and Channel Tres)	2023	—	—	—	—	—	—	—	—	—	—	AudioLust & HigherLove
"Costa" (featuring Chloe Caillet)	2024	—	—	—	—	—	—	—	—	—	—	Non-album singles
"Simple Times" (featuring DJ Seinfeld)	2024	—	—	—	—	—	—	—	—	—	—	Non-album singles
"Love Bites" (with Nelly Furtado and Tove Lo)	2024	—	9	—	6	36	66	—	—	21	2	7
"Heat" (with Tove Lo)	2024	37	—	43	—	—	—	20	86	20	1	Heat EP
"Paradise" (with Loods)	2024	—	—	—	—	—	—	—	—	—	—	Non-album single
"Back Of My Mind"	2025	—	—	—	—	—	—	—	—	—	—	Anemoia
"Sugar" (featuring Shygirl)	2025	—	—	—	—	—	—	—	—	—	—	Anemoia
"Feelings Gone" (featuring London Grammar)	2025	—	—	—	—	—	—	—	—	—	—	Anemoia
"—" denotes a recording that did not chart or was not released in that territory.

==== As featured artist ====
Title	Year	Peak chart positions	Album
Title	Year	US Dance/ Elec.	Album
"Chill Out" (Ray BLK featuring SG Lewis)	2016	—	Durt EP
"I Keep On" (Nylo featuring KYLE and SG Lewis)	2018	—	Non-album single
"Warrior" (Aluna featuring SG Lewis)	2020	—	Renaissance
"Experience" (with Victoria Monét and Khalid)	2020	—	Jaguar
"Mr. Useless" (Shygirl featuring SG Lewis)	2024	38	Club Shy

=== Other charted songs ===
Title	Year	Peak chart positions	Album
Title	Year	US Dance/ Elec.	Album
"Pineapple Slice" (with Tove Lo)	2022	48	Dirt Femme

=== Guest appearances ===
Title	Year	Other artist(s)	Album
"No Less"	2017	G-Eazy, Louis Mattrs	The Beautiful & Damned
"Pressure"	2020	James Vickery	Overture
"Pineapple Slice"	2022	Tove Lo	Dirt Femme

=== Songwriting and production credits ===
Year	Artist	Title	Album	Role
2015	Leo Kalyan	"Fairground"	Silver Linings - EP	Producer
2015	RAYE	"Shine"	Non-album single	Producer
2015	Astronomyy	"Somethin About U"	Non-album single	Producer
2016	KINGDM	"Baby" feat. Kevin Garrett	Non-album single	Writer
2017	Dave	"100 M's"	Non-album single	Writer and producer
2017	Paloma Faith & John Legend	"I'll Be Gentle"	The Architect	Guitar
2018	LANY	"Let Me Know"	Malibu Nights	Writer and producer
2019	Aaron Carpenter	"Attitude"	Non-album single	Writer and producer
2019	James Vickery	"Pressure"	Overture EP	Writer and producer
2020	Kelsea Ballerini	"The Way I Used To"	Kelsea	Writer
2020	Dua Lipa	"Hallucinate"	Future Nostalgia	Writer and producer
2021	MØ	"Live to Survive"	Motordrome	Writer and producer
2021	Jessie Ware	"Hot n Heavy"	What's Your Pleasure: Platinum Edition	Writer and producer
2021	Jodie Harsh	"No Sleep"	Non-album single	Writer and producer
2021	Mabel	"Let Them Know",	About Last Night...	Writer and producer
2021	James Vickery	"Finally"	Songs That Made Me Feel	Writer and producer
2021	Col3trane	"Californication (Feels Like I'm Falling in Love)"	Lush Life	Writer and producer
2021	Elton John	"Orbit"	The Lockdown Sessions	Writer and producer
2021	Smoko Ono & RICH	"Moonlight"	Non-album single	Writer and producer
2022	Jaded	"Moment" with Camden Cox	Non-album single	Writer
2022	Mabel	"Let Love Go" with Lil Tecca	About Last Night...	Writer and producer
2024	Chloe Bailey	"Strawberry Lemonade"	Trouble In Paradise	Writer and producer
2024	Nelly Furtado	"Honesty"	7	Writer and producer
2024	Rauw Alejandro	"Pasaporte (with Mr. NaisGai)"	Cosa Nuestra	Writer and producer

=== Remixes ===
Title	Year	Artist
"You & I (Forever)"	2015	Jessie Ware
"Magnets" (featuring Lorde)	2015	Disclosure
"One More Night"	2016	Michael Kiwanuka
"Big Picture"	2017	London Grammar
"Say It" (featuring Tove Lo)	2017	Flume
"New Rules"	2017	Dua Lipa
"Faded/2am" (featuring GoldLink)	2019	Lila Drew
"Sexy Black Timberlake"	2019	Channel Tres
"More Than A Woman" (SG's Paradise Edit)	2021	Bee Gees
"I'm Every Woman"	2022	Whitney Houston
"To Be Honest"	2023	Christine and the Queens
"Violet"	2024	Majid Jordan
"You & Me"	2024	Moby and Anfisa Letyago
