= In the Lonely Hour =

2014 studio album by Sam Smith

Studio album by Sam Smith
- Released: 26 May 2014
- Recorded: Late 2012–early 2014
- Studio: RAK (London)
- Genres: Pop; soul; R&B
- Length: 32:47
- Labels: Capitol; Method
- Producers: Jimmy Napes; Steve Fitzmaurice; Mojam; Komi; Naughty Boy; Two Inch Punch; Eg White; Fraser T Smith

Sam Smith chronology
| Nirvana (2013) | In the Lonely Hour (2014) | The Lost Tapes – Remixed (2015) |

Singles from In the Lonely Hour
- 1. "Lay Me Down" Released: 15 February 2013; 2. "Money on My Mind" Released: 16 February 2014; 3. "Stay with Me" Released: 14 April 2014; 4. "I'm Not the Only One" Released: 31 August 2014; 5. "Like I Can" Released: 7 December 2014; 6. "Lay Me Down" Released: 22 February 2015 (re-release)

Alternative cover
- In the Lonely Hour (Drowning Shadows Edition)

Singles from In the Lonely Hour (Drowning Shadows Edition)
- 1. "Lay Me Down (Red Nose Day 2015)" Released: 9 March 2015

In the Lonely Hour is the debut studio album by the English singer and songwriter Sam Smith. It was released in the United Kingdom on 26 May 2014 via Capitol UK and Method Records. In the United States, it was released on 17 June 2014 through Capitol Records America. The album includes the hit singles "Money on My Mind" and "Stay with Me", both of which were number one in the UK; the latter becoming a hit worldwide, peaking in the top ten in over 20 countries, including reaching number two in the US. The album's third hit single, "I'm Not the Only One", reached number three in the UK and number five in the US. A deluxe edition of the album contains five bonus tracks, including a solo acoustic version of Disclosure's single "Latch" and Naughty Boy's number-one single "La La La", on both of which Smith provided guest vocals.

Upon its release, In the Lonely Hour received mostly lukewarm reviews from critics, many of whom praised Smith's vocal performance but were critical of the songwriting. The album was a commercial success worldwide, reaching number one in Australia, Ireland, New Zealand, South Africa, Sweden and the United Kingdom. It was the second-best-selling album of 2014 in the UK, and the third-best-selling of 2014 in the United States. It was nominated for Album of the Year and Best Pop Vocal Album at the 57th Annual Grammy Awards, winning the latter. In the Lonely Hour also received a nomination for Best British Album at the 2015 Brit Awards.

The album was re-released in November 2015 as In the Lonely Hour (Drowning Shadows Edition), which features 12 new tracks, including the Disclosure single "Omen" (which features vocals from Smith), the Comic Relief version of "Lay Me Down" featuring John Legend, and covers of Whitney Houston's "How Will I Know" and Amy Winehouse's "Love Is a Losing Game".

== Background ==
It was announced on 16 December 2013 that Smith's debut studio album would be released on 26 May 2014 through Capitol Records. On 7 January 2014, Smith unveiled the artwork and track listing for the album. The standard edition of the album contains ten tracks, including the singles "Lay Me Down" and "Money on My Mind".

In an interview with Digital Spy, Smith described the overarching theme of their (Note: Smith is non-binary and uses they/them pronouns.) album as "sad". Talking about the name of the album they said: "People are saying, 'Oh but it's too sad', but that's what it's about. I was sad, heartbroken, and I wrote about being sad. Hopefully I'll be happier soon and I'll write about that." Smith also said in an interview with The Line of Best Fit that the most personal song in this album is "Good Thing".

In another interview with Digital Spy, when asked to describe the album, they said: "My debut album is just a diary from a lonely 21-year-old. That's what it is. It was my way of talking about the only real issue in my life. I don't have that many sad things going on in my life and it was the only thing that was really affecting me last year: I fell in love with someone who didn't love me back, and it made me get into this head space of, 'Will I find a man to love? When will I find love?' This album is my 'fuck off' to everyone and basically say, 'No, I have been in love with a man and, if anything, it was much more painful than your version', because I'm not getting what I want with a man and it's so close I can almost taste him. So, it's my way of defining what is love, and how unrequited love is just as painful, just as powerful, as what we call 'normal' love."

== Singles ==
"Lay Me Down" was released as the lead single from the album on 15 February 2013. In January 2014, the song entered the UK Singles Chart at number 134 after Smith won the BBC Sound of 2014. It then peaked at number 46 after being mentioned by James Corden at the 2014 Brit Awards.

"Money on My Mind" was released as the album's second official single. It officially impacted radio stations in Italy on 27 December 2013. It was also officially released later in the UK on 12 February 2014 and in Germany on 16 February. The song has peaked to number 1 on the UK Singles Chart and number 4 on the Irish Singles Chart. The song has also charted in Austria, Belgium, Denmark, Germany and the Netherlands. A music video for the song was first released onto YouTube on 12 January 2014. The song has sold in excess of 600,000 copies in the UK alone.

"Stay with Me" was released as the third single. It officially impacted Adult Contemporary radio in the United States on 14 April 2014. It was made available for purchase in the UK as a digital download on 18 May 2014. It debuted at number one on the UK Singles Chart. The song is Smith's most internationally successful, peaking at number two on the US Billboard Hot 100 as well as reaching the top-five in Australia, Austria, Belgium, Canada, Croatia, Denmark, Ireland, Japan, New Zealand, Norway, Poland, South Africa, Spain and Sweden. As of March 2015, the song has sold 3.5 million copies in the US, 700,000 copies in the UK, 300,000 copies in Australia, 400,000 copies in Canada and 200,000 copies in both Germany and Sweden.

"I'm Not the Only One" was the album's fourth single, released on 31 August 2014. It peaked at number three in the United Kingdom and number five in the United States, giving Smith their third top ten hit. It has since gone onto sell in excess of 2,000,000 copies in the US and 600,000 copies in the UK. The song was also successful in Australasia and Europe, peaking within the top-twenty of most charts.

"Like I Can" was released as the album's fifth single on 5 December 2014. It became Smith's fourth consecutive top-ten hit as a lead artist in the UK by reaching number nine on the UK Singles Chart. It also peaked within the top-twenty in Australia and New Zealand.

A re-release of "Lay Me Down" was released as the sixth single from the album on 22 February 2015.

=== Other songs ===
A live version of album track "I've Told You Now", performed at St Pancras Old Church, was made available for free download as part of an Amazon.com promotion on 27 December 2013. "Make It to Me", co-written by Howard of Disclosure and Jimmy Napes, was made available for free download as part of an iTunes Store promotion on 13 January 2014. The song is featured on the deluxe version of the album. Another re-recorded version of "Lay Me Down" was released on 9 March 2015 in the UK. This version features American recording artist John Legend and was released in aid of Comic Relief.

== Critical reception ==
Professional ratings
Aggregate scores
| Source | Rating |
|---|---|
| AnyDecentMusic? | 6.1/10 |
| Metacritic | 62/100 |
Review scores
| Source | Rating |
| AllMusic | 3.5/5 stars |
| The Daily Telegraph | 2/5 stars |
| The Guardian | 3/5 stars |
| The Irish Times | 4/5 stars |
| The Observer | 3/5 stars |
| Pitchfork | 5.5/10 |
| Q | 3/5 stars |
| Rolling Stone | 3/5 stars |
| Slant Magazine | 3.5/5 stars |
| Vice | A− |

In the Lonely Hour received generally lukewarm reviews from critics. At Metacritic, which assigns a normalised rating out of 100 to reviews from mainstream critics, the album received an average score of 62, based 24 reviews, indicating "generally favorable reviews". In The Observer, Kitty Empire appreciated how restrained and emotionally authentic Smith's singing sounds, crediting them for avoiding any exaggerated belting, although she lamented the music's lack of adventurousness. Lily Moayeri from The A.V. Club felt most of the songs are monotonous and lack depth, writing that they are instead showcases for Smith's "rich" voice on an album that is not as good as its singles. Q was more critical, especially of the album's second half, writing that it "declines into self-pity, windy balladry and squeaky-strings-as-authenticity cliché", while Helen Brown of The Daily Telegraph was unimpressed by most of the songwriting and the music, calling it a watered-down version of soul.

Robert Christgau was more enthusiastic in his blog for Vice, writing that Smith's charmingly catchy pop songs cohere into a portrait of a man whose insecurity about love is expressed more sincerely than most other artists without indulging in self-pity: "Both vocally and verbally, they offer the kind of emotional complexity about sexual romance's ins and outs that good pop captures better than good literature, where cynicism is such a folkway." Lauren Murphy from The Irish Times was impressed by the variety in which Smith and their producers use their voice throughout In the Lonely Hour, which she viewed as a sign of promise with songs "so understated yet so vibrant and accomplished".

In the Lonely Hour appeared in many critics' lists of best albums of 2014, including those of Digital Spy, The Daily Telegraph, Time Out and HuffPost.

=== Accolades ===
The album was nominated for Best Album at the 2014 MOBO Awards, whilst Smith was also up for Best Male and Best R&B/Soul Act, and "Stay with Me" was nominated for Best Song. Smith scooped all four awards at the ceremony on 22 October 2014.

On 6 December 2014, it was announced that Smith had been nominated for six awards at the 57th Annual Grammy Awards, including Album of the Year and Best Pop Vocal Album for In the Lonely Hour, and Song of the Year and Record of the Year for "Stay with Me". At the Grammys on 8 February 2015, Smith walked away with four awards, with In the Lonely Hour winning Best Pop Vocal Album and "Stay with Me" winning Song of the Year. The Darkchild remix of the song also won Record of the Year. On 26 February 2015, Smith also won Best British Breakthrough and the Global Success Award at the 2015 Brit Awards.

== Commercial performance ==
On 28 May 2014, In the Lonely Hour debuted at number one on The Official Chart Update in the United Kingdom, outselling Coldplay's album Ghost Stories (which was entering its second week in the charts) by nearly 20,000 copies. On 29 May, the album entered the Irish Albums Chart at number two. On 1 June, the album entered the UK Albums Chart at number one with sales of 101,000, making it the fastest-selling album of 2014 (at the time), and number two in Scotland. In the first five weeks after its release, the album had sold 228,000 copies in the United Kingdom. On 18 December, it was announced that the album had surpassed the 1 million mark in the UK, having sold around 1,007,000 copies by midnight. It became just the second artist album in the UK to sell over 1 million copies a month after Ed Sheeran reached that plateau with his album x. Smith also becoming the only artist to sell 1 million copies of an album in both the UK and the US in 2014. In the Lonely Hour became the second best-selling album of 2014 in the UK with 1,248,000 sold for the year. On 4 September 2015, the album broke the record for most consecutive weeks in the UK top ten for a debut release, which currently stands at 67. On 29 December 2017, it was certified 8× Platinum by the BPI. As of December 2015, In the Lonely Hour has sold 2,140,000 copies in total in the UK, including 893,000 units sold in 2015.

In the United States, In the Lonely Hour debuted and peaked at number two on the Billboard 200, selling 166,000 copies in its first week, making it the largest debut for a solo artist's first album since Phillip Phillips' The World from the Side of the Moon launched with 169,000 at number four on the week ending 25 November 2012. It was beaten to the top spot by Lana Del Rey's Ultraviolence, which sold 182,000 copies that week. The album held at number two the next week with sales of 67,000, bringing the set's total sales in the United States up to 233,000. By the year's end, the album had achieved Platinum status and had shifted 1,210,000 copies in the United States, making it the third best-selling album of 2014 behind 1989 by Taylor Swift and the Frozen soundtrack. In addition, Smith sold 2.8 million singles from the album, while the album was streamed 87 million times and viewed on UK video streaming sites 48 million times. In the US, Smith sold 9.2 million digital track downloads, with "Stay with Me" alone selling 4.1 million. According to Nielsen SoundScan, In the Lonely Hour was also the eight best-selling album of 2015 in the United States, with 1,741,000 album-equivalent units (1,018,000 of that in traditional album sales). The album has sold 2.228 million copies in the US as of December 2015.

In Australia, In the Lonely Hour debuted at number two, behind Coldplay's Ghost Stories and remained in the top 20 until 23 August 2015. With the Australian leg of their In the Lonely Hour Tour in April 2015, the album rose to peak at number one for the week commencing 27 April 2015, in its 48th week.

"In The Lonely Hour" was phenomenally successful in New Zealand, spending 68 non-consecutive weeks in the top 10, including 8 non-consecutive weeks at the summit of the chart. The album has been certified 4× Platinum as of 7 December 2015 for sales exceeding 60,000 copies and was the fourth-to-highest selling album of 2014 in New Zealand. The album is placed 5 in New Zealand's all-time best-charting albums.

Supported by the release of their second album's lead single, the album returned to the Swedish and Danish top 10 in September and November 2017 respectively - more than 3 years after its release.

According to the International Federation of the Phonographic Industry, "In The Lonely Hour" sold 3.5 million copies in 2014 and 2.6 million copies in 2015, becoming the fifth best-selling album of both years.

In 2015, In the Lonely Hour was ranked as the third most popular album of the year on the Billboard 200.

== Tour ==
The In the Lonely Hour Tour was announced in October 2014, with North American, European, Asian, and Oceania dates revealed. It began on 9 January 2015 in Atlanta and concluded on 12 December 2015 in Brisbane. The tour grossed $26.3 million from 62 shows reported by Pollstar 2015's Year-end Top 100 worldwide Tours list from 490,854 tickets sold.

== Track listing ==
In the Lonely Hour – Standard edition
| No. | Title | Writer(s) | Producer(s) | Length |
|---|---|---|---|---|
| 1. | "Money on My Mind" | Sam Smith; Ben Ash | Two Inch Punch | 3:12 |
| 2. | "Good Thing" | S. Smith; Francis White | Eg White | 3:21 |
| 3. | "Stay with Me" | S. Smith; James Napier; William Phillips; Tom Petty; Jeff Lynne | Jimmy Napes; Steve Fitzmaurice^{[a]} | 2:52 |
| 4. | "Leave Your Lover" | S. Smith; Simon Aldred | Napes; Fitzmaurice | 3:08 |
| 5. | "I'm Not the Only One" | S. Smith; Napier | Napes; Fitzmaurice | 3:59 |
| 6. | "I've Told You Now" | S. Smith; White | White; Napes; Fitzmaurice | 3:30 |
| 7. | "Like I Can" | S. Smith; Matt Prime | Napes; Fitzmaurice; Mojam^{[a]} | 2:47 |
| 8. | "Life Support" | S. Smith; Ash | Two Inch Punch | 2:53 |
| 9. | "Not in That Way" | S. Smith; Fraser T Smith | Fraser T Smith | 2:52 |
| 10. | "Lay Me Down" | S. Smith; Napier; Elvin Smith | Napes; Fitzmaurice | 4:13 |
| Total length: | | | | 32:47 |

In the Lonely Hour – Deluxe edition bonus tracks
| No. | Title | Writer(s) | Producer(s) | Length |
|---|---|---|---|---|
| 11. | "Restart" | S. Smith; Zane Lowe | Zane Lowe; Napes^{[a]} | 3:52 |
| 12. | "Latch" (Acoustic) | S. Smith; Howard Lawrence; Guy Lawrence; Napier | Napes | 3:43 |
| 13. | "La La La" (Naughty Boy featuring Sam Smith) | S. Smith; Shahid Khan; Al-Hakam El-Kaubaisy; Napier; James Murray; Omer; Jonny Coffer; Frobisher Mbabazi | Naughty Boy; Komi; Mojam^{[b]} | 3:40 |
| 14. | "Make It to Me" | S. Smith; H. Lawrence; Napier | Napes; Fitzmaurice; H. Lawrence | 2:40 |
| Total length: | | | | 46:42 |

In the Lonely Hour – European iTunes deluxe edition bonus tracks
| No. | Title | Writer(s) | Producer(s) | Length |
|---|---|---|---|---|
| 11. | "Restart" | S. Smith; Zane Lowe | Zane Lowe; Napes^{[a]} | 3:52 |
| 12. | "Latch" (Acoustic) | S. Smith; Howard Lawrence; Guy Lawrence; Napier | Napes | 3:43 |
| 13. | "La La La" (Naughty Boy featuring Sam Smith) | S. Smith; Shahid Khan; Al-Hakam El-Kaubaisy; Napier; Murray; Omer; Jonny Coffer; Frobisher Mbabazi | Naughty Boy; Komi; Mojam^{[b]} | 3:40 |
| 14. | "Reminds Me of You" | S. Smith; Joel Little | Little | 3:14 |
| 15. | "Make It to Me" | S. Smith; H. Lawrence; Napier | Napes; Fitzmaurice; H. Lawrence | 2:40 |
| Total length: | | | | 49:56 |

In the Lonely Hour – Google Play bonus tracks
| No. | Title | Writer(s) | Producer(s) | Length |
|---|---|---|---|---|
| 15. | "In the Lonely Hour" (Acoustic) | S. Smith; Napier | Napes | 2:54 |
| 16. | "Nirvana" (Acoustic) | S. Smith; Napier; Harry Craze; Hugo Chegwin; Anup Paul | Craze & Hoax; Jonathan Creek^{[b]} | 3:45 |
| Total length: | | | | 56:35 |

In the Lonely Hour – Target deluxe edition bonus tracks
| No. | Title | Writer(s) | Producer(s) | Length |
|---|---|---|---|---|
| 11. | "Restart" | S. Smith; Zane Lowe | Zane Lowe; Napes^{[a]} | 3:52 |
| 12. | "Latch" (Acoustic) | S. Smith; Howard Lawrence; Guy Lawrence; Napier | Napes | 3:43 |
| 13. | "La La La" (Naughty Boy featuring Sam Smith) | S. Smith; Shahid Khan; Al-Hakam El-Kaubaisy; Napier; Murray; Omer; Jonny Coffer; Frobisher Mbabazi | Naughty Boy; Komi; Mojam^{[b]} | 3:40 |
| 14. | "Reminds Me of You" | S. Smith; Joel Little | Little | 3:14 |
| 15. | "Stay with Me" (Darkchild Remix featuring Mary J. Blige) | S. Smith; Napier; Phillips | Napes; Rodney Jerkins^{[a]}; Fitzmaurice^{[a]} | 2:53 |
| 16. | "In the Lonely Hour" (Acoustic) | S. Smith; Napier | Napes | 2:52 |
| Total length: | | | | 53:01 |

In the Lonely Hour – Japan bonus tracks
| No. | Title | Writer(s) | Producer(s) | Length |
|---|---|---|---|---|
| 11. | "Restart" | S. Smith; Zane Lowe | Zane Lowe; Napes^{[a]} | 3:52 |
| 12. | "Latch" (Acoustic) | S. Smith; Howard Lawrence; Guy Lawrence; Napier | Napes | 3:43 |
| 13. | "La La La" (Naughty Boy featuring Sam Smith) | S. Smith; Shahid Khan; Al-Hakam El-Kaubaisy; Napier; Murray; Omer; Jonny Coffer; Frobisher Mbabazi | Naughty Boy; Komi; Mojam^{[b]} | 3:40 |
| 14. | "Make It to Me" | S. Smith; H. Lawrence; Napier | Napes; Fitzmaurice; H. Lawrence | 2:40 |
| 15. | "Reminds Me of You" | S. Smith; Joel Little | Little | 3:14 |
| 16. | "Stay with Me" (Darkchild Remix featuring Mary J. Blige) | S. Smith; Napier; Phillips | Napes; Rodney Jerkins^{[a]}; Fitzmaurice^{[a]} | 2:53 |
| 17. | "In the Lonely Hour" (Acoustic) | S. Smith; Napier | Napes | 2:52 |
| 18. | "Nirvana" | S. Smith; Napier; Harry Craze; Hugo Chegwin; Anup Paul | Craze & Hoax; Jonathan Creek^{[b]} | 3:22 |
| 19. | "Safe with Me" | S. Smith; Ash | Two Inch Punch | 3:04 |
| 20. | "Together" (Disclosure, Sam Smith, Nile Rodgers and Jimmy Napes) | Nile Rodgers; Napier; H. Lawrence; G. Lawrence; S. Smith | Disclosure; Rodgers; Napes | 2:22 |
| 21. | "Stay with Me" (Darkchild Remix) (not available on digital editions) | S. Smith; Napier; Phillips | Napes; Jerkins^{[a]}; Fitzmaurice^{[a]} | 2:53 |
| Total length: | | | | 67:22 |

In the Lonely Hour – Japanese deluxe edition bonus disc
| No. | Title | Writer(s) | Producer(s) | Length |
|---|---|---|---|---|
| 1. | "Stay with Me" (Shy FX Remix) | S. Smith; Napier; Phillips | Napes; Fitzmaurice^{[a]} | 3:34 |
| 2. | "Stay with Me" (Wilfred Giroux Remix) | S. Smith; Napier; Phillips | Napes; Fitzmaurice^{[a]} | 4:37 |
| 3. | "I'm Not the Only One" (featuring A$AP Rocky) | | Napes; Fitzmaurice | 3:43 |
| 4. | "I'm Not the Only One" (Armand Van Helden Remix) | | Napes; Fitzmaurice | 6:36 |
| 5. | "I'm Not the Only One" (Grant Nelson Remix) | S. Smith; Napier | Napes; Fitzmaurice | 6:49 |
| 6. | "Money on My Mind" (MK Remix) | S. Smith; Ben Ash | Two Inch Punch | 6:37 |
| 7. | "Money on My Mind" (Le Youth Remix) | S. Smith; Ben Ash | Two Inch Punch | 3:03 |
| 8. | "Money on My Mind" (Salute Remix) | S. Smith; Ben Ash | Two Inch Punch | 3:45 |
| 9. | "Lay Me Down" (Pomo Remix) | S. Smith; Napier; E. Smith | Napes; Fitzmaurice | 3:44 |
| 10. | "Lay Me Down" (Paul Woolford) | S. Smith; Napier; E. Smith | Napes; Fitzmaurice | 6:43 |
| 11. | "Lay Me Down" (Maya Jane Coles Remix) | S. Smith; Napier; E. Smith | Napes; Fitzmaurice | 5:18 |
| 12. | "Lay Me Down" (Todd Edwards Remix) | S. Smith; Napier; E. Smith | Napes; Fitzmaurice | 6:30 |
| 13. | "Like I Can" (Artful Remix) | S. Smith; Matt Prime | Napes; Fitzmaurice; Mojam^{[a]} | 4:35 |
| 14. | "Like I Can" (Jonas Rathsman Remix) | S. Smith; Matt Prime | Napes; Fitzmaurice; Mojam^{[a]} | 7:01 |
| 15. | "Like I Can" (iLL BLU Remix) | S. Smith; Matt Prime | Napes; Fitzmaurice; Mojam^{[a]} | 6:32 |

In the Lonely Hour – Japanese premium edition bonus DVD
| No. | Title | Length |
|---|---|---|
| 1. | "Nirvana" |
| 2. | "I'm Not the Only One" |
| 3. | "Leave Your Lover" |
| 4. | "Latch" (Disclosure featuring Sam Smith) |
| 5. | "Lay Me Down" |
| 6. | "Stay With Me" (Music video) |

In the Lonely Hour – Fnac special deluxe edition bonus disc
| No. | Title | Writer(s) | Producer(s) | Length |
|---|---|---|---|---|
| 1. | "Reminds Me of You" | S. Smith; Little | Little | 3:14 |
| 2. | "In the Lonely Hour" (Acoustic) | S. Smith; Napier | Napes | 2:52 |

In the Lonely Hour (Drowning Shadows Edition) – bonus tracks
| No. | Title | Writer(s) | Producer(s) | Length |
|---|---|---|---|---|
| 1. | "Restart" | S. Smith; Zane Lowe | Zane Lowe; Napes^{[a]} | 3:52 |
| 2. | "Latch" (Acoustic) | S. Smith; Howard Lawrence; Guy Lawrence; Napier | Napes | 3:43 |
| 3. | "La La La" (Naughty Boy featuring Sam Smith) | S. Smith; Shahid Khan; Al-Hakam El-Kaubaisy; Napier; Murray; Omer; Jonny Coffer; Frobisher Mbabazi | Naughty Boy; Komi; Mojam^{[b]} | 3:40 |
| 4. | "Make It to Me" | S. Smith; H. Lawrence; Napier | Napes; Fitzmaurice; H. Lawrence | 2:40 |
| 5. | "Drowning Shadows" | S. Smith; F. T Smith | Napes; Fitzmaurice | 4:13 |
| 6. | "Love Is a Losing Game" | Amy Winehouse | Napes; Fitzmaurice | 2:57 |
| 7. | "Nirvana" | S. Smith; Napier; Harry Craze; Hugo Chegwin; Anup Paul | Craze & Hoax; Jonathan Creek^{[b]} | 3:22 |
| 8. | "How Will I Know" | George Merrill; Shannon Rubicam; Narada Michael Walden | | 3:52 |
| 9. | "Omen" (Acoustic) | H. Lawrence; G. Lawrence; S. Smith; Napier | Napes; Disclosure; Fitzmaurice | 3:25 |
| 10. | "Latch" (featuring Disclosure) (Live from Madison Square Garden) | S. Smith; H. Lawrence; G. Lawrence; Napier | | 8:06 |
| 11. | "Stay with Me" (Darkchild Remix featuring Mary J. Blige) | S. Smith; Napier; Phillips | Napes; Rodney Jerkins^{[a]}; Fitzmaurice^{[a]} | 2:53 |
| 12. | "I'm Not the Only One" (Remix featuring A$AP Rocky) | S. Smith; Napier; Rakim Mayers | Napes; Fitzmaurice | 3:43 |
| 13. | "Lay Me Down" (Red Nose Version) (featuring John Legend) | S. Smith; Napier; E. Smith | Napes; Fitzmaurice | 3:39 |

Notes

- ^{^[a]} signifies an additional producer
- ^{^[b]} signifies a co-producer

== Charts ==
=== Weekly charts ===
| Chart (2014–2015) | Peak position |
|---|---|
| Argentine Albums (CAPIF) | 7 |
| Australian Albums (ARIA) | 1 |
| Austrian Albums (Ö3 Austria) | 15 |
| Belgian Albums (Ultratop Flanders) | 5 |
| Belgian Albums (Ultratop Wallonia) | 9 |
| Brazilian Albums (ABPD) | 4 |
| Canadian Albums (Billboard) | 2 |
| Croatian International Albums (HDU) | 5 |
| Czech Albums (ČNS IFPI) | 22 |
| Danish Albums (Hitlisten) | 2 |
| Dutch Albums (Album Top 100) | 3 |
| Finnish Albums (Suomen virallinen lista) | 13 |
| French Albums (SNEP) | 9 |
| German Albums (Offizielle Top 100) | 17 |
| Irish Albums (IRMA) | 1 |
| Italian Albums (FIMI) | 20 |
| Japanese Albums (Oricon) | 11 |
| Mexican Albums (AMPROFON) | 7 |
| New Zealand Albums (RMNZ) | 1 |
| Norwegian Albums (VG-lista) | 2 |
| Polish Albums (ZPAV) | 12 |
| Portuguese Albums (AFP) | 12 |
| Russian Albums (NFPP) | 3 |
| Scottish Albums (Official Charts) | 1 |
| South African Albums (RISA) | 1 |
| Spanish Albums (Promusicae) | 12 |
| Swedish Albums (Sverigetopplistan) | 1 |
| Swiss Albums (Schweizer Hitparade) | 3 |
| UK Albums (Official Charts) | 1 |
| US Billboard 200 | 2 |

| Chart (2017) | Peak position |
|---|---|
| Latvian Albums (LaIPA) | 52 |

=== Year-end charts ===
| Chart (2014) | Position |
|---|---|
| Australian Albums (ARIA) | 6 |
| Belgian Albums (Ultratop Flanders) | 49 |
| Belgian Albums (Ultratop Wallonia) | 141 |
| Canadian Albums (Billboard) | 11 |
| Danish Albums (Hitlisten) | 11 |
| Dutch Albums (MegaCharts) | 18 |
| French Albums (SNEP) | 130 |
| German Albums (Offizielle Top 100) | 84 |
| Irish Albums (IRMA) | 4 |
| New Zealand Albums (RMNZ) | 4 |
| Norwegian Autumn Period Albums (VG-lista) | 2 |
| Swedish Albums (Sverigetopplistan) | 14 |
| Swiss Albums (Schweizer Hitparade) | 61 |
| UK Albums (OCC) | 2 |
| US Billboard 200 | 11 |
| Chart (2015) | Position |
| Australian Albums (ARIA) | 6 |
| Belgian Albums (Ultratop Flanders) | 14 |
| Belgian Albums (Ultratop Wallonia) | 43 |
| Brazilian Albums (ABPD) | 18 |
| Canadian Albums (Billboard) | 3 |
| Danish Albums (Hitlisten) | 6 |
| Dutch Albums (MegaCharts) | 11 |
| French Albums (SNEP) | 41 |
| Irish Albums (IRMA) | 6 |
| Italian Albums (FIMI) | 72 |
| Japanese Albums (Oricon) | 65 |
| Mexican Albums (AMPROFON) | 15 |
| New Zealand Albums (RMNZ) | 4 |
| Norwegian Winter Period Albums (VG-lista) | 2 |
| Polish Albums (ZPAV) | 45 |
| Spanish Albums (PROMUSICAE) | 75 |
| Swedish Albums (Sverigetopplistan) | 3 |
| Swiss Albums (Schweizer Hitparade) | 20 |
| UK Albums (OCC) | 3 |
| US Billboard 200 | 3 |
| Chart (2016) | Position |
| Australian Albums (ARIA) | 88 |
| Danish Albums (Hitlisten) | 25 |
| Dutch Albums (MegaCharts) | 42 |
| New Zealand Albums (RMNZ) | 21 |
| Swedish Albums (Sverigetopplistan) | 68 |
| UK Albums (OCC) | 43 |
| US Billboard 200 | 57 |
| Chart (2017) | Position |
| Danish Albums (Hitlisten) | 19 |
| Dutch Albums (MegaCharts) | 78 |
| Icelandic Albums (Tónlistinn) | 25 |
| New Zealand Albums (RMNZ) | 30 |
| Swedish Albums (Sverigetopplistan) | 35 |
| UK Albums (OCC) | 60 |
| US Billboard 200 | 99 |
| Chart (2018) | Position |
| Danish Albums (Hitlisten) | 30 |
| Icelandic Albums (Tónlistinn) | 27 |
| Swedish Albums (Sverigetopplistan) | 34 |
| UK Albums (OCC) | 51 |
| US Billboard 200 | 84 |
| Chart (2019) | Position |
| Belgian Albums (Ultratop Flanders) | 129 |
| Danish Albums (Hitlisten) | 59 |
| Icelandic Albums (Tónlistinn) | 46 |
| Swedish Albums (Sverigetopplistan) | 73 |
| UK Albums (OCC) | 65 |
| US Billboard 200 | 139 |
| Chart (2020) | Position |
| Belgian Albums (Ultratop Flanders) | 157 |
| Danish Albums (Hitlisten) | 86 |
| Icelandic Albums (Tónlistinn) | 63 |
| New Zealand Albums (RMNZ) | 35 |
| UK Albums (OCC) | 70 |
| US Billboard 200 | 194 |
| Chart (2021) | Position |
| Belgian Albums (Ultratop Flanders) | 141 |
| Danish Albums (Hitlisten) | 65 |
| Icelandic Albums (Tónlistinn) | 46 |
| Swedish Albums (Sverigetopplistan) | 51 |
| UK Albums (OCC) | 64 |
| US Billboard 200 | 188 |
| Chart (2022) | Position |
| Belgian Albums (Ultratop Flanders) | 98 |
| Danish Albums (Hitlisten) | 66 |
| Icelandic Albums (Tónlistinn) | 32 |
| Lithuanian Albums (AGATA) | 97 |
| New Zealand Albums (RMNZ) | 20 |
| Swedish Albums (Sverigetopplistan) | 71 |
| UK Albums (OCC) | 55 |
| Chart (2023) | Position |
| Belgian Albums (Ultratop Flanders) | 114 |
| Icelandic Albums (Tónlistinn) | 66 |
| Swedish Albums (Sverigetopplistan) | 84 |
| UK Albums (OCC) | 82 |
| Chart (2024) | Position |
| Belgian Albums (Ultratop Flanders) | 122 |
| New Zealand Albums (RMNZ) | 27 |
| UK Albums (OCC) | 94 |
| Chart (2025) | Position |
| Australian Albums (ARIA) | 95 |
| Belgian Albums (Ultratop Flanders) | 180 |
| UK Albums (OCC) | 85 |

=== Decade-end charts ===
| Chart (2010–2019) | Position |
|---|---|
| Australian Albums (ARIA) | 24 |
| UK Albums (OCC) | 6 |
| US Billboard 200 | 14 |

== Certifications and sales ==
| Region | Certification | Certified units/sales |
|---|---|---|
| Australia (ARIA) | 6× Platinum | 420,000^{‡} |
| Austria (IFPI Austria) | Platinum | 15,000^{*} |
| Belgium (BRMA) | Gold | 15,000^{*} |
| Brazil (Pro-Música Brasil) | Gold | 20,000^{*} |
| Canada (Music Canada) | 8× Platinum | 640,000^{‡} |
| Denmark (IFPI Danmark) | 8× Platinum | 160,000^{‡} |
| France (SNEP) | Platinum | 100,000^{*} |
| Germany (BVMI) | Platinum | 200,000^{‡} |
| Iceland (FHF) | Gold | 5,000 |
| Italy (FIMI) | Platinum | 50,000^{‡} |
| Mexico (AMPROFON) | 2× Platinum | 120,000^{^} |
| Netherlands (NVPI) | Platinum | 50,000^{^} |
| New Zealand (RMNZ) | 13× Platinum | 195,000^{‡} |
| Norway (IFPI Norway) | Platinum | 20,000^{‡} |
| Poland (ZPAV) | 3× Platinum | 60,000^{‡} |
| Singapore (RIAS) | 2× Platinum | 20,000^{*} |
| South Africa (RISA) | Platinum | 40,000^{*} |
| South Korea | — | 13,587 |
| Spain (Promusicae) | Gold | 20,000^{‡} |
| Sweden (GLF) | 2× Platinum | 80,000^{‡} |
| Switzerland (IFPI Switzerland) | Platinum | 20,000^{^} |
| United Kingdom (BPI) | 10× Platinum | 3,000,927 |
| United States (RIAA) | 5× Platinum | 5,000,000^{‡} |
Summaries
| Europe (IFPI) | Platinum | 1,000,000^{*} |
| Worldwide | — | 12,000,000 |
^{*} Sales figures based on certification alone.^{^} Shipments figures based on certification alone.^{‡} Sales+streaming figures based on certification alone.

== In the Lonely Hour 10 Year Anniversary Edition ==
In the Lonely Hour 10 Year Anniversary Edition

Studio album (reissue) by Sam Smith
- Released: 2 August 2024
- Label: Capitol

Sam Smith chronology
| Gloria (2023) | In the Lonely Hour 10 Year Anniversary Edition (2024) | Hazel Eyes (2026) |

In the Lonely Hour 10 Year Anniversary Edition is a reissue of Sam Smith's debut studio album In the Lonely Hour, released on 2 August 2024 to commemorate the tenth anniversary of the album's original release. Announced on 13 June 2024, it contains the 10 tracks of the original album and the previously unreleased song "Little Sailor" as well as newly recorded live performances. Smith also re-recorded their song "Stay with Me" with an updated lyric reflecting their new non-binary identity.

== Certifications ==
Certifications for "In The Lonely Hour (10th Anniversary Edition)"
| Region | Certification | Certified units/sales |
|---|---|---|
| Brazil (Pro-Música Brasil) deluxe | 2× Diamond | 320,000^{‡} |
^{‡} Sales+streaming figures based on certification alone.

== Release history ==
| Region | Date | Format | Label |
|---|---|---|---|
| United Kingdom | 26 May 2014 | CD; LP; digital download | Capitol UK; Method |
| United States | 17 June 2014 | CD; LP; digital download | Capitol UK; Method |
| China | 13 July 2014 | CD | Universal |
| Japan | 21 January 2015 | CD; LP; digital download | Universal |
| Various (Drowning Shadows Edition) | 6 November 2015 | 2CD; LP; digital download | Capitol; Universal; Method |
| Various; 10 Year Anniversary Edition | 2 August 2024 | LP; digital download | Capitol |
