= I'm Not the Only One =

Single by Sam Smith

from the album In the Lonely Hour
- Released: 31 August 2014
- Genre: Soul
- Length: 3:59 (album version); 3:21 (radio edit)
- Label: Capitol
- Songwriters: Sam Smith; James Napier
- Producers: Jimmy Napes; Steve Fitzmaurice

Sam Smith singles chronology
"Stay with Me" (2014)	"I'm Not the Only One" (2014)	"Like I Can" (2014)

Official music video
- "I'm Not the Only One" on YouTube

"I'm Not the Only One" is a song recorded by the English singer Sam Smith from their debut studio album, In the Lonely Hour (2014). It was written by Smith with Jimmy Napes, who also produced the song along with Steve Fitzmaurice. Capitol Records released it to digital download on 31 August 2014 as the album's third single in the United Kingdom and on 24 September 2014 as the album's second single in the United States; an alternative version with American rapper A$AP Rocky was also released.

A piano soul ballad, anchored by orchestral strings and a gospel structure, "I'm Not the Only One" deals with themes of infidelity in a relationship and was inspired by a marriage of someone Smith and Napes knew. It received a positive response from critics, who praised their emotional vocals and its instrumentation. Commercially, the song was another success for Smith, becoming a number one hit in South Africa, top-three hit in the United Kingdom, a top-five hit in the United States, and a top-ten hit in over ten countries. It is certified Diamond in Australia, seven-times platinum in the US, and multiplatinum in ten additional countries. It was the bestselling international song in South Korea in 2016. A music video featuring actors Dianna Agron and Chris Messina was released on 1 August 2014 and it features content similar to the song's lyrics.

== Background and release ==
After the success of previous singles, "Money on My Mind" and "Stay with Me" on the UK Singles Chart - with both becoming number-one singles, while the latter a worldwide hit - Smith announced that "I'm Not the Only One" was going to be the album's third single and that it would be released on 31 August 2014 to digital download in the United Kingdom. They chose the song to be released as a single since it was one of the songs that both they and their fans loved. They commented: "I just wanted to bring out a song that is classic and that had longevity to it. If you listen to the record, there's a few songs on there I actually think would be safer bets to go in terms of radio, but I wanted to make a statement. I also want people to know that I'm not just doing it to have big radio hits. I want people to buy into the album and I feel like 'I'm Not the Only One' is an album-seller."

On 10 September 2014, a remix version of the song featuring American rapper A$AP Rocky was released worldwide through online music stores. Smith recalled that Zane Lowe called them and left a voice mail on their phone telling them the song was a hip-hop track and that he needed a rapper on it, and inspired them to get a rapper and show a different side of the music. The song was released as the second single in the United States, being serviced first to adult alternative radio on 24 September 2014 and later on 1 October 2014 to hot adult contemporary and contemporary hit radio.

In June 2024 Smith performed the song live with American singer Alicia Keys in New York City's restaurant Julius. The artists re-recorded the song for the 10th anniversary edition of In the Lonely Hour, published on 2 August 2024. On 29 August 2024, Smith released another version of the song featuring South Korean singer Taeyeon.

== Composition ==
"I'm Not the Only One" was written by Sam Smith with Jimmy Napes, who was also responsible for the song's production along with Steve Fitzmaurice. The latter also recorded and mixed the song at The Pierces Room, London, while the song's strings were arranged and conducted by Simon Hale. The piano-led, marching midtempo soul ballad has strings, drums, piano, percussion, bass guitar and guitar as its main instrumentation with a gospel structure. This song is played in the key of F Major with a tempo of 82 beats per minute. Smiths's vocals range from the note of F_{3} to C_{5}. They admitted that they recorded the song when they were hungover, calling their vocals "hungover vocals". As Smith explained in a track-by-track commentary for Digital Spy, "Napes played the chords one day and I was obsessed with them. We wrote a completely different song on top of those chords and it wasn't very good, so we scrapped it. Then two weeks later, I just loved the chords so we returned to them, and then we wrote 'I'm Not The Only One' in like an hour."

Lyrically, "I'm Not the Only One" talks about infidelity and betrayal in a relationship, where someone decides to stay with a partner they know was cheating on them. In the chorus, Smith admits: "You say I'm crazy/'Cause you don't think I know what you've done/But when you call me baby/I know I'm not the only one". Smith revealed to Lewis Corner that the song was the only one on the album that is not about their life, but a marriage they observed first-hand, where they put themselves into the woman's shoes. They added:

It came really naturally! The person I wrote it with, we both knew them and we just vibed off each other. We both had really strong opinions on what the woman was doing. It's quite a complex song. When you listen to it you think it's just bashing a guy for cheating, but it's not, it actually talks more about how the woman's a mug. She knows she's not the only one, but she's never going to leave. I think that's wrong.

== Critical reception ==
The song received positive reviews from most music critics. Harley Brown of Billboard praised the track, calling it "[t]he first turning point of the record [...] where Smith goes home, dries off, and picks himself back up." Brown also added that "[t]he violins surging behind the breakdown are so high-pitched they practically sting." Lily Moayeri of The A.V. Club calling it one of the album's driving forces, noting that it "illustrates this with sophisticated piano and escalating strings." Ryan Lathan of PopMatters observed that "the charming 'I'm Not the Only One' confidently struts out from the rest of the set. An obvious candidate for future single, it's the type of track that elicits head bobbing and finger snapping the second it begins." Jon Dolan of Rolling Stone called it "gorgeously bruising", while Andy Kellman of AllMusic picked it as one of the album's best tracks. Eric Davidson of CMJ thought that "[t]he Al Green vibe of 'I'm Not The Only One' has a verging-on-stern sentiment couched in a deeper groove that seems like a good direction Smith could head in."

In his review for Consequence of Sound, Sheldon Pearce called it "a two-stepping delight despite its somber tone." Adam Workman of The National noted that the song "really stands out among hackneyed lyrical content on love and longing; his high-pitched vocal extremes and fairly basic grasp of rhyming couplets both soon begin to rankle, too." Ben Kelly of Attitude opined that the song is "the album's bluesy moment" [...] "echo[ing] of Sittin' on the Dock of the Bay, with Sam's strong falsetto running free as ever." Maeve Heslin of Hot Press labelled it "laidback, funky soul at its finest." Paul Cantor of Vibe praised the song's "lush and expansive" arrangements, called it a "notably highlight" and noting that it is "brought to life by Smith's clever vocal arpeggiations and phrasings." Rachel Sonis of Idolator defined it as "a jazzy, soothing, coffee shop-ready number that sticks to the album's 'quiet moments in life' theme", noting similarities to Adele's melancholic approach and praising the song for "show[ing] off his precious pipes more than ever before."

== Commercial performance ==
Following the success of their breakthrough single "Stay with Me", "I'm Not the Only One" found chart success in several countries. In the United Kingdom, the song entered the UK Singles Chart at number ninety-three, when the album was released on the week of 1 June 2014, before it re-entered at number sixty-nine on the week of 10 August 2014. It kept climbing the charts in the following weeks until it reached a peak of number three on the week of 14 September 2014. By reaching number three, the song became the album's third top-three hit for the singer, whose last two singles from the album reached number-one. In Ireland, the song reached number six, becoming their third top-ten hit. In Europe, the song also reached the top-ten in Denmark, Italy and Netherlands.

In the United States, "I'm Not the Only One" shared similar success. It debuted on the Billboard Hot 100 at number sixty-nine, during the same week where "Stay with Me" was in the top-ten and "Latch" was reaching the top-twenty. It later reappeared at number ninety-three, and within four weeks the song climbed to number twenty-five, becoming that week's biggest gain in digital sales. The following week, the song reached number twenty, marking their fastest flight to the top-twenty (seven weeks) among his four entries. Four weeks later, the song climbed to number nine, thus earning Smith their third top-ten single in the same year (2014). With three top ten singles, Smith became the only male to achieve the feat in 2014 and the third overall artist with the most top ten singles of 2014, along with Iggy Azalea, who also scored three, and behind Ariana Grande, who had four. It eventually peaked at number five, becoming their second top-five hit.

In Australia, the song failed to reach the top-ten by one position, reaching its peak at number eleven, ending their streak of consecutive top-five singles, but in New Zealand the song peaked at number three, earning their second consecutive top-three single. The song was certified 10× platinum by the Australian Recording Industry Association and 7× Platinum by Recorded Music NZ. In Brazil, the song was their first top-forty hit, reaching its peak at number thirty-nine. The song was also successful in South Africa, where it reached the top of the charts, and South Korea, where the international song peaked at number one.

== Music video ==
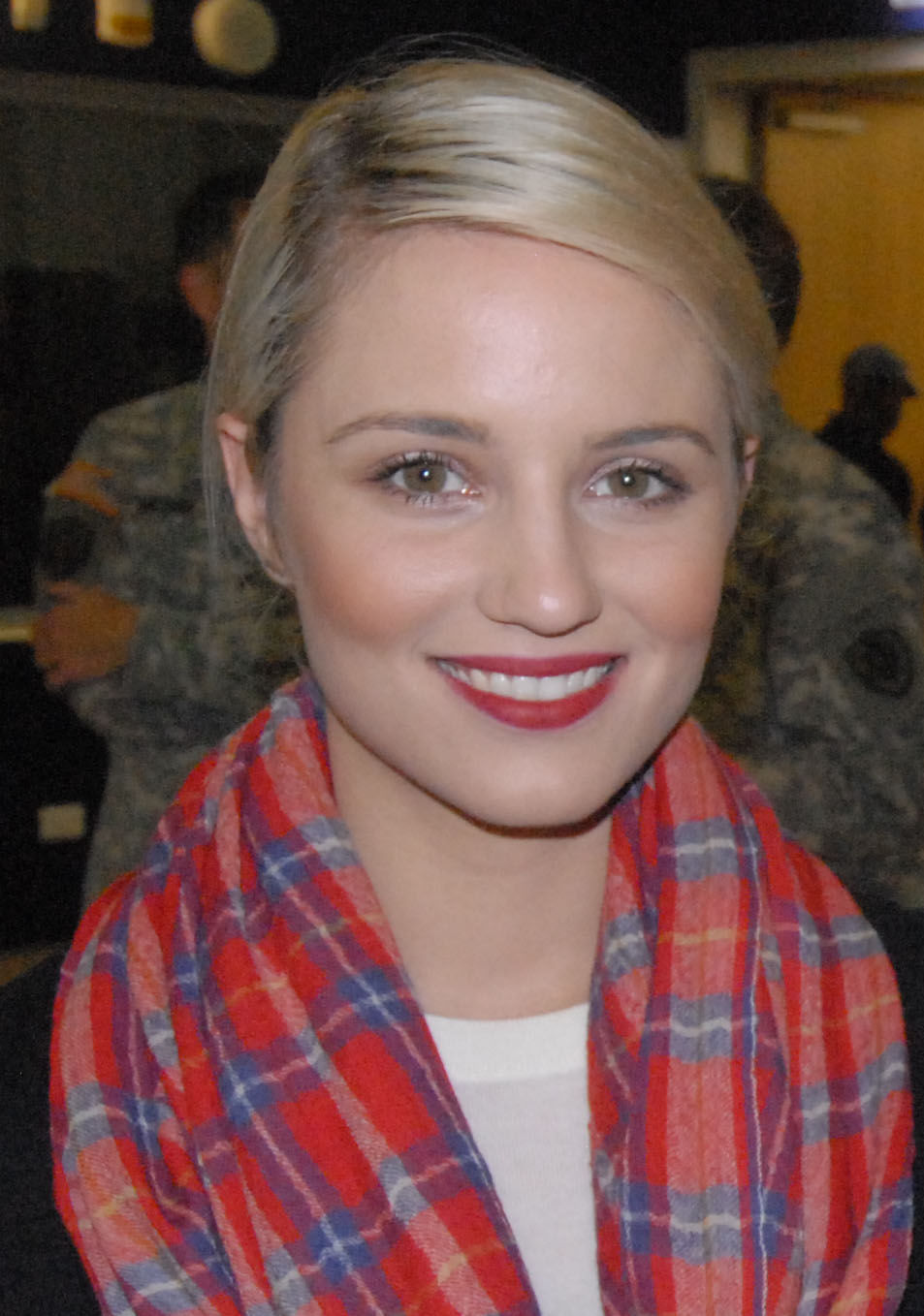
Dianna Agron plays the part of a scorned bride in the music video.

The official music video for "I'm Not the Only One" was directed by Luke Monaghan, who also worked with Smith on the video for "Leave Your Lover", and it was filmed in Los Angeles on 8 July 2014. The music video features Glee's Dianna Agron as a scorned bride and The Mindy Project's Chris Messina as the cause of and cure for her heartache. As Smith revealed: "I'm a huge fan of both of them. I thought I had my dream team around me." Agron revealed that she "tweeted Sam a long time ago and told him how important it was that I discovered his music. He tweeted me back, and we started messaging each other. Then the video happened, and we've become friends." Smith also claimed they wanted to "bring the song to life a bit more'" and "strike a nerve with a certain group of people". It was released to Smith's YouTube/VEVO channel on 1 August 2014.

The cycle of infidelity is the main theme of both the video and the song. It starts with a shot of the couple's house with Agron telling Messina that she made him breakfast, but he says he is in too much of a rush to eat it. She walks him out, and then he goes straight to a bar and does shots with his mistress, while Agron's character drinks alcohol and pieces together her husband's indiscretions. While Smith performs in the saloon, Agron proceeds to uncork a bottle of white wine in the middle of her neighbourhood liquor store, drink away her problems, and then eventually set fire to Messina's possessions. At the end of the video, she welcomes him back home as if nothing had happened.

In France, the music video was broadcast throughout the day with a warning Not advised to kids under 10 years old (in French : déconseillé aux moins de 10 ans) in some channels following a sex scene in a dark room and some others scenes who aren't destined at a young public (auto-destruction images, violent scenes etc...). Some others broadcast after 10:00 but with no warning.

As of December 2024, the video has received over 1.7 billion views.

== Usage in media ==
In Brazil, the song was part of the international soundtrack to the telenovela Babilônia (2015). The song is also featured in the television shows The Flash and Suits.

== Track listings ==
- Digital download (remix)
1. "I'm Not the Only One" (featuring A$AP Rocky) – 3:42
- Digital download (EP)
1. "I'm Not the Only One" (Radio Edit) – 3:24
2. "I'm Not the Only One" (Armand Van Helden Remix) – 6:35
3. "I'm Not the Only One" (Grant Nelson Remix) – 6:47
4. "I'm Not the Only One" (Armand Van Helden's 'DAT SHIZNIT IZ SLAMMIN' Remix) – 4:06

== Charts ==
=== Weekly charts ===
Weekly chart performance for "I'm Not the Only One"
Chart (2014–2016)	Peak position
Australia (ARIA)	11
Austria (Ö3 Austria Top 40)	15
Belgium (Ultratop 50 Flanders)	13
Belgium Urban (Ultratop Flanders)	2
Belgium (Ultratop 50 Wallonia)	18
Brazil (Billboard Brasil Hot 100)	39
Canada Hot 100 (Billboard)	2
Canada AC (Billboard)	1
Canada CHR/Top 40 (Billboard)	2
Canada Hot AC (Billboard)	2
Czech Republic Airplay (ČNS IFPI) featuring A$AP Rocky	31
Czech Republic Singles Digital (ČNS IFPI) featuring A$AP Rocky	5
Denmark (Tracklisten)	5
Euro Digital Song Sales (Billboard)	7
Finland Download (Latauslista)	29
France (SNEP)	13
France Airplay (SNEP)	1
Germany (GfK)	39
Hungary (Single Top 40)	15
Hungary (Stream Top 40)	8
Iceland (RÚV)	3
Ireland (IRMA)	6
Italy (FIMI)	10
Japan Hot 100 (Billboard)	72
Luxembourg Digital Song Sales (Billboard)	9
Mexico (Billboard Mexican Airplay)	5
Mexico Anglo (Monitor Latino)	4
Netherlands (Dutch Top 40)	16
Netherlands (Single Top 100)	3
New Zealand (Recorded Music NZ)	3
Norway (VG-lista)	21
Poland Airplay (ZPAV)	2
Portugal Digital Song Sales (Billboard)	5
Romania Airplay (Media Forest)	6
Scottish Singles Sales (Official Charts)	6
Slovakia Airplay (ČNS IFPI)	47
Slovakia Airplay (ČNS IFPI) featuring A$AP Rocky	7
Slovakia Singles Digital (ČNS IFPI)	16
Slovakia Singles Digital (ČNS IFPI) featuring A$AP Rocky	4
Slovenia (SloTop50)	12
South Africa Airplay (EMA)	1
South Korea International (Gaon)	1
Spain (Promusicae)	16
Sweden (Sverigetopplistan)	13
Switzerland (Schweizer Hitparade)	12
UK Singles (Official Charts)	3
US Billboard Hot 100	5
US Adult Contemporary (Billboard)	3
US Adult Pop Airplay (Billboard)	3
US Dance Airplay (Billboard)	11
US Pop Airplay (Billboard)	4
US R&B/Hip-Hop Airplay (Billboard)	29
US Rhythmic Airplay (Billboard)	10
US Rock & Alternative Airplay (Billboard)	47

2022 weekly chart performance for "I'm Not the Only One"
Chart (2022)	Peak position
Global 200 (Billboard)	94
Portugal (AFP)	99
South Korea (Circle)	102

2024 weekly chart performance for "I'm Not the Only One" (with Taeyeon)
Chart (2024)	Peak position
South Korea (Circle)	139

=== Year-end charts ===
2014 year-end chart performance for "I'm Not the Only One"
Chart (2014)	Position
Australia (ARIA)	56
Canada (Canadian Hot 100)	63
Hungary (Single Top 40)	100
Hungary (Stream Top 40)	61
Italy (Musica e dischi)	78
Netherlands (Dutch Top 40)	69
Netherlands (Single Top 100)	46
New Zealand (Recorded Music NZ)	18
Russia Airplay (Tophit)	189
UK Singles (OCC)	24

2015 year-end chart performance for "I'm Not the Only One"
Chart (2015)	Position
Belgium (Ultratop 50 Flanders)	81
Belgium (Ultratop 50 Wallonia)	57
Brazil (Crowley)	44
Canada (Canadian Hot 100)	28
CIS (Tophit)	79
Denmark (Tracklisten)	48
France (SNEP)	51
Hungary (Stream Top 40)	79
Italy (FIMI)	78
Netherlands (Dutch Top 40)	83
Netherlands (Single Top 100)	40
New Zealand (Recorded Music NZ)	43
Russia Airplay (Tophit)	71
Slovenia (SloTop50)	39
South Korea International (Gaon)	3
Spain (PROMUSICAE)	91
Sweden (Sverigetopplistan)	66
Switzerland (Schweizer Hitparade)	56
UK Singles (OCC)	79
US Billboard Hot 100	26
US Adult Contemporary (Billboard)	11
US Adult Top 40 (Billboard)	18
US Mainstream Top 40 (Billboard)	28

2016 year-end chart performance for "I'm Not the Only One"
Chart (2016)	Position
South Korea International (Gaon)	1

2017 year-end chart performance for "I'm Not the Only One"
Chart (2017)	Position
South Korea International (Gaon)	5

2023 year-end chart performance for "I'm Not the Only One"
Chart (2023)	Position
South Korea (Circle)	137

2024 year-end chart performance for "I'm Not the Only One"
Chart (2024)	Position
South Korea (Circle)	192

== Certifications ==
Region	Certification	Certified units/sales
Australia (ARIA)	10× Platinum	700,000^{‡}
Austria (IFPI Austria)	2× Platinum	60,000^{*}
Brazil (Pro-Música Brasil)	3× Diamond	750,000^{‡}
Canada (Music Canada)	2× Platinum	160,000^{*}
Denmark (IFPI Danmark)	4× Platinum	360,000^{‡}
Germany (BVMI)	Platinum	400,000^{‡}
Italy (FIMI)	2× Platinum	100,000^{‡}
Mexico (AMPROFON)	Platinum	60,000^{*}
Netherlands (NVPI)	Gold	15,000^{^}
New Zealand (RMNZ)	8× Platinum	240,000^{‡}
Norway (IFPI Norway)	4× Platinum	240,000^{‡}
Portugal (AFP)	2× Platinum	20,000^{‡}
South Korea	—	2,500,000
Spain (Promusicae)	3× Platinum	180,000^{‡}
Sweden (GLF)	3× Platinum	120,000^{‡}
Switzerland (IFPI Switzerland)	Gold	15,000^{‡}
United Kingdom (BPI)	4× Platinum	2,400,000
United States (RIAA)	7× Platinum	7,000,000^{‡}
Streaming
Denmark (IFPI Danmark)	Gold	1,300,000^{†}
Greece (IFPI Greece)	Gold	1,000,000^{†}
^{*} Sales figures based on certification alone.^{^} Shipments figures based on certification alone.^{‡} Sales+streaming figures based on certification alone.^{†} Streaming-only figures based on certification alone.

== Release history ==
Country	Date	Format	Label	Ref.
United Kingdom	31 August 2014	Digital download	Capitol	
Canada	10 September 2014	Digital download (A$AP Rocky remix)	Capitol	
United Kingdom	10 September 2014	Digital download (A$AP Rocky remix)	Capitol	
United States	10 September 2014	Digital download (A$AP Rocky remix)	Capitol	
United States	24 September 2014	Adult album alternative	Capitol	
United States	30 September 2014	Contemporary hit radio	Capitol	
United States	30 September 2014	Hot adult contemporary	Capitol	
Italy	17 October 2014	Radio airplay		

== See also ==
- List of best-selling singles in South Korea
- List of highest-certified singles in Australia
- List of number-one singles of 2014 (South Africa)
