= Nirvana (EP) =

EP by Sam Smith
- Released: 3 October 2013
- Recorded: 2012–13
- Genres: R&B; soul; acoustic
- Labels: PMR; Capitol

Sam Smith chronology
| Nirvana (2013) | In the Lonely Hour (2014) |

Nirvana is the debut extended play (EP) by the English singer-songwriter Sam Smith. It was released in the United Kingdom as a digital download on 4 October 2013. The EP includes an acoustic version of Disclosure's "Latch". "Safe with Me" peaked at No. 86 and "Nirvana" peaked at No. 82 on the UK singles chart in October 2013.

== Background ==
The EP contains four tracks. The first, titled "Safe with Me", is produced by Two Inch Punch and premiered on MistaJam's BBC Radio 1Xtra show on 24 July 2013. The second song on the EP is titled "Nirvana" and is produced by Craze & Hoax and Jonathan Creek. The EP also includes Smith's acoustic solo version of "Latch" and a live version of "I've Told You Now". In an interview with BBC Radio 1, they said that the songs on the EP were "experimental" and would not appear on their album In the Lonely Hour.

== Track listing ==
| No. | Title | Writer(s) | Producer(s) | Length |
|---|---|---|---|---|
| 1. | "Safe with Me" | Sam Smith; Ben Ash | Two Inch Punch | 3:04 |
| 2. | "Nirvana" | Smith; James Napier; Harry Craze; Hugo Chegwin; Anup Paul | Craze & Hoax; Jonathan Creek (co.) | 3:22 |
| 3. | "I've Told You Now" (Live at St Pancras Old Church, London 2013) | Smith; Eg White | | 4:00 |
| 4. | "Latch" (Acoustic) | Smith; Howard Lawrence; Guy Lawrence; Camille Campbell | | 3:41 |

US edition additional tracks
| No. | Title | Writer(s) | Producer(s) | Length |
|---|---|---|---|---|
| 5. | "Together" (Disclosure, Sam Smith, Nile Rodgers and Jimmy Napes) | Nile Rodgers; James Napier; H. Lawrence; G. Lawrence; Smith | Disclosure; Nile Rodgers; Jimmy Napes | 2:22 |
| 6. | "Money on My Mind" | Smith; Ash | Two Inch Punch | 3:14 |
| 7. | "Nirvana" (Harry Fraud remix) | Smith; Napier; Craze; Chegwin; Paul | Craze & Hoax; Jonathan Creek (co.) | 3:17 |

== Charts ==
| Chart (2014) | Peak position |
|---|---|
| US Billboard 200 | 126 |
| US Heatseekers Albums (Billboard) | 1 |

== Release history ==
| Region | Date | Format | Label |
|---|---|---|---|
| United Kingdom | 4 October 2013 | Digital download; 7" | PMR |
| United States | 28 January 2014 | Digital download | Capitol |
