= Dan Parry =

British Mix/Recording engineer

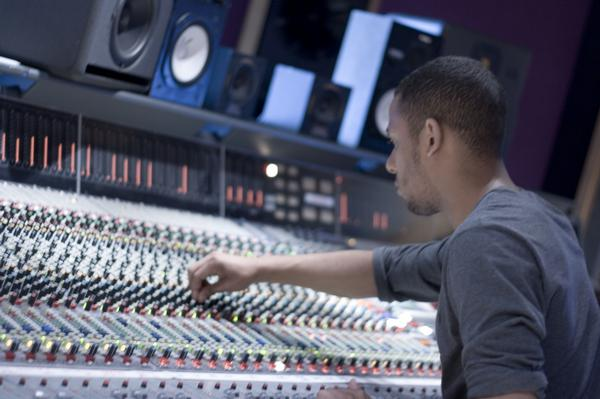
Parry mixing in Studio C at Metropolis

Dan Parry is a British Mix/Recording engineer. His career began in 2001 working at Soul II Soul Studios in Camden Town, before joining Metropolis studios in 2004.

Progressing through the ranks at Metropolis Studios Parry eventually became full-time assistant engineer to Mix Engineer, Tom Elmhirst who was based at Metropolis at the time. Parry spent the next five years assisting Elmhirst on artists such as Amy Winehouse, Adele, and Mark Ronson.

In 2010 Lady Gaga's The Fame Monster LP was nominated for a Grammy Award for Album of the Year. Parry's involvement on a few tracks on the album (credited as "Engineer, Tracking") was recognised in the nomination. The album did not win in this category.

Following his work assisting Elmhirst on the mixing of four tracks on the Adele album 21 (credited as "Assisted by") and additional vocal recording on one of those tracks (credited as "Additional Vocals Recorded by") Parry was included in the nominations for "Album of the Year" at the 54th Grammys. The album won this category.

== Career highlights to date ==
Year	Nominee / work	Award	Result
2011	The Fame Monster (Lady Gaga)	Album of the Year	Nominated
2012	21 (Adele)	Album of the Year	Won
2015	In the Lonely Hour (Sam Smith)	Album of the Year	Nominated

== Other credits ==
- 2014: Paloma Faith – A Perfect Contradiction
- 2014: Sam Smith – In the Lonely Hour
- 2014: Sohn – Tremors
- 2016: Tourist – U
