= City Reign =

Indie rock band from Manchester, England

- Origin: Manchester, England
- Genres: Alternative rock, indie rock
- Years active: 2008 – present
- Label: Car Boot Records
- Members: Chris Bull; Michael Grice; Duncan Bolton; Ryan Ashton
- Past members: Michael Glaze; Sam Jones
- Website: www.cityreign.net

City Reign are an indie rock band from Manchester, England. Originally from London, the band moved to Manchester to focus on a music career. The band created their own record label Car Boot Records in 2010.

== Biography ==
The songwriting pair Chris Bull and Michael Grice first met at a Ryan Adams concert at the Manchester Academy in 2006. Having spent some years writing and playing in bands together, they formed City Reign in late 2008 playing on the name of the Adams' song, City Rain, City Streets.

The band recorded their first recording daybreak e.p with Grammy winner Dan Parry in 2009 at Metropolis Studios, London. The band set up their own label Car Boot Records in 2010 and released a demo single Making Plans. The single was played by Steve Lamacq, who then included them on the list of his favourite new bands during the 2010s in the City Festival. Follow up releases Out in the Cold and Daybreak gained favourable reviews from The Independent and Manchester Evening News.

Original band members Sam Jones and Michael Glaze left the band in 2011 and were replaced by Duncan Bolton and former touring member Ryan Ashton. The band recorded their debut album Another Step at Salford Trinity Church in 2012 and undertook a UK and European tour to promote single Ahead of Ideas. Another Step was released on 25 February 2013.

The band premiered two follow up singles When You Got It All and Disappear on Steve Lamacq's 6 Music show before they recorded their second album.

== Discography ==
=== Albums ===
- Another Step (Car Boot Records – CBR06) – 25 February 2013

=== Singles ===
- Disappear (Car Boot Records – CBR10) – 17 November 2014
- When You Got It All (Car Boot Records – CBR09) – 23 September 2014
- See What It's Worth (Car Boot Records – CBR08) – 24 March 2014
- Ahead of Ideas (Car Boot Records – CBR05) – 5 November 2012
- Daybreak (Car Boot Records – CBR03) – 9 May 2011
- Out in the Cold (Car Boot Records – CBR02) – 31 January 2011
- Making Plans (Car Boot Records – CBR01) – 21 September 2010

=== Extended plays ===
- Numbers For Street Names (Car Boot Records – CBR04) – 21 November 2011
- daybreak e.p – Unreleased
