= Jonas Rathsman =

Swedish producer and graphic designer

- Born: 31 March 1980 (age 45); Sweden
- Genres: House; deep house; electronic
- Occupations: Producer, graphic designer
- Instrument: Synthesiser
- Years active: 2011–present
- Labels: French Express; Crosstown Rebels; Diynamic

Jonas Rathsman is a Swedish producer of electronic music and graphic designer

He was born in a small village in Western Sweden. At the age of 18, he started organizing parties at local nightclubs in Gothenburg. Using this platform Jonas Rathsman began producing music under his own name and quickly caught the attention of the French Express label. It was with French Express that he began to release his music, starting in 2011 with the bass heavy 'Love Is My Middle Name' which was featured on the second instalment of the French Express compilation. Jonas quickly followed up this success with his first solo release on French Express 'Tobago/Feeling You' gaining high-profile support from the likes of The Magician.

Jonas' reputation continued to grow following two more releases on French Express, 'Since I Don't Have You' and 'W4W' that got notable BBC Radio 1 support from Pete Tong, who was such a fan of Jonas' output that he invited him to play the coveted Essential Mix with fellow French Express artist, Perseus.

He continued to supply the world of underground house music with releases on French Express and his productions eventually lead to Pete Tong tipping Jonas Rathsman as his 'Future Star' for 2014. As a result of this he was asked to remix Sam Smith's single, Like I Can later that year.

Disclosure are now the most notable backers and have invited him to produce the inaugural release on their new extension of Method Records, 'Method White'. 'Wolfsbane' was released on 23 March 2015.

Over 2017, Rathsman designed and created a six-room studio complex, situated in an industrial area of Gothenburg where the North Sea flows into the city.

Having released on a range of imprints from Diynamic and KX to Crosstown Rebels and Mobilee, Rathsman is now focusing his efforts on building his ELEMENTS brand, a journey which began in 2017 off the back of his debut BBC Radio 1 Essential Mix.

In 2018 ELEMENTS has grown into a multifaceted brand and is split into three parts: the label, the mix series and the parties. The label was successfully introduced with Rathsman's own 'Within Borders' and is about to celebrate its seventh release from French techno hero Sébastien Léger. Its events arm launched with a how at London's Autumn Street Studios and has taken residency in XOYO for 2018 having hosted Pional and Fort Romeu for their opening with Kiasmos soon to follow.

== Discography ==
=== Tracks ===
Year	Title	Label
2011	Love Is My Middle Name	French Express
2011	Tobago	French Express
2011	Feeling You	French Express
2012	Since I Don't Have You	French Express
2012	W4W	French Express
2013	Bringing You Down	French Express
2013	Yes I Am	Local Talk
2013	Feel What I Feel	French Express
2014	I Hope I'm Wrong	French Express
2014	Skepparkrans	French Express
2015	Wolfsbane	Method White
2015	New Generation	KX
2016	Complex	Crosstown Rebels
2017	X Series Volume 1	Elements
2017	Within Borders EP	Elements
2018	Draumzer EP	Mobilee

=== Remixes ===
Year	Title	Original Artist
2013	Coming Down	Monkey Safari
2013	Strong	London Grammar
2013	Another Love	Tom Odell
2014	I Got U	Duke Dumont
2014	Love Sublime	Tensnake
2014	Call	Francesco Yates
2014	Like I Can	Sam Smith
2015	Omen	Disclosure
