= Stay with Me (Sam Smith song) =

2014 single by Sam Smith

Single by Sam Smith

from the album In the Lonely Hour
- Released: 14 April 2014
- Recorded: 2012–2013
- Length: 2:52
- Label: Capitol
- Songwriters: Sam Smith; James Napier; William Phillips; Tom Petty; Jeff Lynne
- Producers: Sam Smith; Jimmy Napes; Steve Fitzmaurice; Rodney Jerkins (Darkchild version)

Sam Smith singles chronology
"Money on My Mind" (2014)	"Stay with Me" (2014)	"I'm Not the Only One" (2014)

Music video
- "Sam Smith - Stay With Me" on YouTube

"Stay with Me" is a song by the English singer Sam Smith from their debut studio album In the Lonely Hour (2014). It was released in the United States on 14 April 2014 and in the United Kingdom on 18 May 2014. "Stay with Me" is a gospel-inspired ballad that details the narrator pleading with their one-night stand not to leave them. The song was written by Smith, James Napier, and William Phillips, with Tom Petty and Jeff Lynne later receiving co-writer credits due to the song's noted melodic similarity to Petty's single "I Won't Back Down".

The song has become Smith's most successful single to date, peaking at number one in the UK singles chart (becoming Smith's third chart-topper there, second as a solo artist), topping the charts in Canada and New Zealand, and reaching number two on the US Billboard Hot 100. It has also reached top ten status in over twelve countries worldwide. At the 57th Annual Grammy Awards ceremony, Darkchild's version of "Stay with Me" won two Grammy Awards for Record of the Year and Song of the Year.

== Background ==
In an interview with NME, Smith said that the song was written in a studio in Old Street with James Napier (Jimmy Napes) and William Phillips (also known as "Tourist"). Phillips started playing with three chords on the piano, and Napier quickly provided a drum pattern, and according to Smith, "the song just flowed out of us so naturally," and the song was written in thirty to forty minutes. After finishing the song, Smith started to layer vocals about twenty times, singing in different parts of the studio and harmonizing. The result sounded like a gospel choir, but all from Smith's own voice, and this demo was then used in the released song.

According to Smith, "the song is about the moment in the morning after a one night stand, where the person you are with leaves your house, and you are left by yourself, and it's just a second, where you are just like: 'I wish, I wish'. You don't even love them, you don't really fancy them that much, it's just nice to have someone in the bed next to you." The song won the Grammy Awards for Record of the Year and Song of the Year, and in their acceptance speech for winning the Record of the Year, Smith said that "I want to thank the man who this record is about who I fell in love with last year. Thank you so much for breaking my heart because you got me four Grammys."

On 25 March 2014, the song was played for the first time on Zane Lowe's BBC Radio 1 show at 7.30 pm. On 29 March, they performed the song live on NBC's Saturday Night Live in the U.S. On 16 May, they performed the song on The Graham Norton Show. In June, they returned to the U.S. as part of their tour where they performed the song on Good Morning America, at the Apollo Theater in New York with Mary J. Blige, and David Letterman.

On 22 August 2024, a new version of the song with Japanese American singer-songwriter Hikaru Utada was released to celebrate the 10th anniversary of Smith's album In The Lonely Hour.

== Agreement with Tom Petty and Jeff Lynne ==
In January 2015, it was revealed that a settlement had been reached with Tom Petty's publishing company to add Petty and Jeff Lynne as co-writers, and that they would receive a 12.5% songwriting credit. Petty's publisher contacted Smith's team after it noticed a likeness between "Stay with Me" and the melody of Petty's 1989 song "I Won't Back Down". Petty clarified that he did not believe Smith intentionally plagiarized him, saying "All my years of songwriting have shown me these things can happen. Most times, you catch it before it gets out the studio door, but in this case, it got by. Sam's people were very understanding of our predicament and we easily came to an agreement." According to Smith, they had never heard "I Won't Back Down" before writing "Stay with Me", but they acknowledged the similarity after listening to the song, and said that the likeness was "a complete coincidence". Petty and Lynne, however, were not eligible for a Grammy as the Recording Academy considered "Stay with Me" to have been interpolated from "I Won't Back Down" by Napier, Phillips and Smith; instead Petty and Lynne would be given certificates to honor their contribution to the work, as is usual for writers of sampled or interpolated work.

== Composition ==
"Stay with Me"
A 17-second sample of "Stay with Me" by Sam Smith, where the chorus is heard.

According to Musicnotes.com, "Stay with Me" is written in the key of C major (a key signature without sharps nor flats) and is composed in common time, and played at a tempo of 84 beats per minute.

"Stay with Me" was written by Smith, James Napier, William Phillips, with additional credits to Tom Petty and Jeff Lynne. According to Erine Keane of Salon, "Stay with Me" combines a "contemporary drumbeat", blue-eyed soul singing, and a refrain sung in a gospel style, while Stereogum's Tom Breihan called it "a soft-focus piano-soul ballad". Smith described the writing process and the meaning of the song:

"It was Jimmy who came up with the idea of 'Stay with Me'. Immediately got me thinking of a one-night stand, and my views on that. The lyric came from us just vibing. It's about the moment in the morning after a one night stand, where the person you are with leaves your house, and you are left by yourself, and it's just a second, where you are just like: 'I wish, I wish'. You don't even love them, you don't really fancy them that much, it's just nice to have someone in the bed next to you. The whole song came out then. It happened so simply that it felt like it wasn't even us writing it. It felt like it completely came through, like something greater was happening."

For the tenth anniversary edition of In the Lonely Hour set to be released on 2 August 2024, Smith re-recorded the song. It includes a lyric change from "But I still need love 'cause I'm just a man" to "But I still need love, baby understand". The change, which Smith described as "really important to [them]", was made in light of their coming out as non-binary in 2019.

== Critical reception ==
"Stay with Me" received generally positive reviews from music critics. Amy Davidson from Digital Spy called the song an "emotional crescendo" and said the chorus was "slightly over-sentimental" and felt that their "soulful voice" made the singer left in "defeat by fleeting fling". She gave the song four out of five stars. Joe Gross from Rolling Stone gave the song a mixed review, awarding it three of five stars. Isabel Pearson of Nouse gave the song a positive review during her album review, calling the song a "euphoric, slow building love-song that's raw and undeniably one of the best tracks on this album." Sarah Milton of The Upcoming lauded the song, calling it "electrifying with its blunt honesty and exquisite gospel influence."

In July 2014, Billboard listed "Stay with Me" as one of the "10 Best Songs of 2014 (so far)" saying that the song is "a fragile ballad that finds its backbone when a gospel choir assists the British singer on the harrowing chorus." Variance Magazine named the song its 2014 Song of Summer. The song was placed at number twelve on Rolling Stone's 50 Best Songs of 2014 list. In January 2015, "Stay with Me" was ranked at number 15 on The Village Voice's annual year-end Pazz & Jop critics' poll.

== Commercial performance ==
In the UK Singles Chart it debuted at number one, making it Smith's third number one. The song became the eighth best-selling song of 2014 in the UK, and the seventh overall when streaming is included. On the Billboard Hot 100, the song peaked at number two for two weeks, making it Smith's first top ten song in the US as a lead artist and their second-highest charting single after "Unholy" (2022). It was held off from the top spot by MAGIC!'s "Rude." As of the week of 2 May 2015, "Stay with Me" has spent 21 weeks in the top ten and 54 weeks on the Hot 100. The song was the tenth best-selling song of 2014 in the United States with 3.34 million copies sold in that year. As of June 2015, The song has sold 4.1 million copies in the US. In Canada, "Stay with Me" topped the Canadian Hot 100 for seven consecutive weeks. In Australia, the song debuted at number 22 on the ARIA Singles Chart on the chart dated 5 May 2014 and later peaked at number five on the chart date 16 June 2014. The song also reached top 10 status in over twelve countries worldwide, becoming Smith's most successful single to date.

== Music video ==
A music video to accompany the release of "Stay with Me" was first released onto YouTube on 27 March 2014 at a total length of three minutes and twenty-nine seconds. The video shows Smith coming out of a house and walking down a street in De Beauvoir Town, London, sitting in a room performing the song, and performing the song in a church with a choir. It was directed by Jamie Thraves. "Stay with Me" received nominations at the MTV Video Music Awards for Best Male Video and Artist to Watch. As of April 2025, the video has received over 1.2 billion views.

== Cover versions ==
In June 2014, Ed Sheeran covered "Stay with Me" at BBC Radio 1's Live Lounge. He explained his choice saying "It's my favourite song of the last year. I think it's an instant classic." Florence and the Machine covered it at the Orange Warsaw Festival. In July, Vin Diesel sang it during an interview with Capital FM. In August, Chris Brown posted a video on Instagram in which he sings the song with lyric changes. Eventual winner Josh Kaufman covered the song for his top 12 performance on the sixth season of The Voice US. Reigan Derry performed the song for "Top 10 Hits" themed week on the sixth series of The X Factor Australia, and her performance debuted at number 20 on the ARIA Singles Chart. In September 2014, FKA twigs also covered it at BBC Radio 1's Live Lounge. Also in September, Charli XCX covered it at Live 95.5's Bing Lounge. Luke James also covered the song, which appeared on his 2014 self-titled album. Kelly Clarkson covered the song at her free concert in honor of the new Microsoft store at the SouthPark Mall in Charlotte, North Carolina. Singer Patti LaBelle performed it in November 2014 on her concert tour. Romain Virgo did a reggae cover. In September 2017, Pink covered "Stay with Me" at BBC Radio 1's Live Lounge.

In January 2015, Angus & Julia Stone released a cover of the song titled "Stay With Me - Live From Spotify Berlin" as part of their EP Spotify Sessions. The song was certified Platinum by the Australian Recording Industry Association (ARIA) in 2024.

In November 2017, US country singer Coffey Anderson released it as part of his Sad Love Songs series accompanied by a music video directed by Terry W.

The song is sampled in the track "Freak" from Avicii's posthumous album Tim, which it was released on 6 June 2019.

In 2018, American R&B group The Temptations covered the song in their 2018 album, "All The Time". English folk group Bear's Den covered the song for the Sunday Sessions.

T-Pain recorded a cover of "Stay with Me" for his 2023 covers album On Top of the Covers.

== Live performances ==
- Smith debuted the song live as the musical guest on Saturday Night Live on 29 March 2014.
- Smith performed the song at the 2014 MTV Video Music Awards on 24 August 2014 at The Forum in Inglewood, California.
- US R&B artist Mary J. Blige performed alongside Smith in a live version of the song also in Los Angeles at the 57th Annual Grammy Awards. Blige provided her vocals in the second verse in place of Smith. The performance is on the artist's Vevo channel.

== Media usage ==
The song is featured in the television series Mistresses, Girlfriends' Guide to Divorce, Bad Education, and The Mindy Project.

Actor Marlon Wayans lip-synced this song on Spike's Lip Sync Battle.

The song is played in the emotional scene where Mary, Queen of Scots (Adelaide Kane) and a dying Francis II of France (Toby Regbo) dance together in the television series Reign.

In the 2016 animated film Sing, Johnny (voiced by Taron Egerton) sings this song as his audition for the singing competition.

The song is also used as the background music for the Inspiron 17 5000 commercial, with Liev Schreiber and Chris Pratt.

== Formats and track listings ==
- CD single
1. "Stay with Me" – 2:52
2. "Stay with Me" (Radio Mix) – 2:53
- Digital download (Darkchild Version)
1. "Stay with Me" (Darkchild Version) featuring Mary J. Blige – 2:53
2. "Stay with Me" (Darkchild Version) – 2:54
- Digital download (EP)
1. "Stay with Me"(Soul Clap Mix) – 5:02
2. "Stay with Me" (Darkchild Version) – 2:54
3. "Stay with Me" (Shy FX Remix) – 3:32
4. "Stay with Me" (Wilfred Giroux Remix) – 4:39
- Rainer + Grimm Remix single
1. "Stay with Me" (Rainer + Grimm Remix) – 3:34

== Charts ==
=== Weekly charts ===
2014–2015 weekly chart performance for "Stay with Me"
Chart (2014–2015)	Peak position
Australia (ARIA)	5
Austria (Ö3 Austria Top 40)	3
Belgium (Ultratop 50 Flanders)	8
Belgium Dance (Ultratop Flanders)	6
Belgium (Ultratop 50 Wallonia)	3
Belgium Dance (Ultratop Wallonia)	4
Brazil (Billboard Brasil Hot 100)	46
Canada Hot 100 (Billboard)	1
Canada AC (Billboard)	1
Canada CHR/Top 40 (Billboard)	3
Canada Hot AC (Billboard)	1
Czech Republic Airplay (ČNS IFPI)	32
Czech Republic Singles Digital (ČNS IFPI)	6
Denmark (Tracklisten)	3
Euro Digital (Billboard)	1
Finland (Suomen virallinen lista)	14
France (SNEP)	6
Germany (GfK)	11
Greece Digital (Billboard)	9
Hungary (Single Top 40)	33
Hungary (Stream Top 40)	7
Iceland (RÚV) featuring Mary J. Blige	9
Ireland (IRMA)	1
Israel International Airplay (Media Forest)	1
Italy (FIMI)	6
Japan Hot 100 (Billboard)	5
Luxembourg Digital (Billboard)	5
Mexico Ingles Airplay (Billboard)	17
Netherlands (Dutch Top 40)	2
Netherlands (Single Top 100)	3
New Zealand (Recorded Music NZ)	1
Norway (VG-lista)	3
Poland Airplay (ZPAV)	1
Portugal Digital (Billboard)	5
Scottish Singles Sales (Official Charts)	1
Slovakia Airplay (ČNS IFPI)	2
Slovakia Singles Digital (ČNS IFPI)	4
Slovenia (SloTop50)	7
South Africa Airplay (EMA)	1
Spain (Promusicae)	2
Sweden (Sverigetopplistan)	4
Switzerland (Schweizer Hitparade)	6
UK Singles (Official Charts)	1
US Billboard Hot 100	2
US Adult Alternative Airplay (Billboard)	1
US Adult Contemporary (Billboard)	1
US Adult R&B Songs (Billboard)	1
US Adult Pop Airplay (Billboard)	1
US Dance Airplay (Billboard)	4
US Dance Club Songs (Billboard)	37
US Pop Airplay (Billboard)	1
US R&B/Hip-Hop Airplay (Billboard)	10
US Rhythmic Airplay (Billboard)	5
US Rock & Alternative Airplay (Billboard)	36

2025–2026 weekly chart performance for "Stay with Me"
Chart (2025–2026)	Peak position
Israel International Airplay (Media Forest)	18
Nigeria Airplay (TurnTable)	50

Weekly chart performance for "Stay with Me" (featuring Hikaru Utada)
Chart (2024)	Peak position
Japan Digital Singles (Oricon)	31
Japan Download Songs (Billboard Japan)	34
Japan Hot Overseas (Billboard Japan)	6

=== Year-end charts ===
2014 year-end chart performance for "Stay with Me"
Chart (2014)	Position
Australia (ARIA)	8
Austria (Ö3 Austria Top 40)	44
Belgium (Ultratop 50 Flanders)	35
Belgium (Ultratop 50 Wallonia)	58
Canada (Canadian Hot 100)	8
Denmark (Tracklisten)	10
France (SNEP)	46
Germany (Official German Charts)	35
Hungary (Stream Top 40)	43
Ireland (IRMA)	9
Italy (FIMI)	25
Netherlands (Dutch Top 40)	8
Netherlands (Single Top 100)	5
New Zealand (Recorded Music NZ)	5
Norway Summer Period (VG-lista)	9
Poland (Polish Airplay Top 100)	28
Slovenia (SloTop50)	40
Spain (PROMUSICAE Streaming)	57
Sweden (Sverigetopplistan)	10
Switzerland (Schweizer Hitparade)	20
Taiwan (Hito Radio)	77
Tokio Hot 100 (J-Wave)	93
UK Singles (Official Charts Company)	7
US Billboard Hot 100	10
US Adult Alternative Songs (Billboard)	4
US Adult Contemporary (Billboard)	7
US Adult Top 40 (Billboard)	3
US Dance/Mix Show Airplay (Billboard)	50
US Mainstream Top 40 (Billboard)	8
US Rhythmic (Billboard)	28

2015 year-end chart performance for "Stay with Me"
Chart (2015)	Position
Australia (ARIA)	87
Belgium (Ultratop 50 Flanders)	84
Belgium (Ultratop 50 Wallonia)	47
Canada (Canadian Hot 100)	64
Denmark (Tracklisten)	56
France (SNEP)	53
Italy (FIMI)	69
Japan (Japan Hot 100)	46
Netherlands (Dutch Top 40)	141
Netherlands (Single Top 100)	49
New Zealand (Recorded Music NZ)	31
Slovenia (SloTop50)	44
Spain (PROMUSICAE)	51
Sweden (Sverigetopplistan)	71
Switzerland (Schweizer Hitparade)	54
UK Singles (Official Charts Company)	61
US Billboard Hot 100	58
US Adult Contemporary (Billboard)	14

2016 year-end chart performance for "Stay with Me"
Chart (2016)	Position
Brazil (Billboard Brasil Hot 100)	47
Slovenia (SloTop50)	33

=== Decade-end charts ===
2010s-end chart performance for "Stay with Me"
Chart (2010–2019)	Position
Australia (ARIA)	40
Netherlands (Single Top 100)	17
UK Singles (Official Charts Company)	33
US Billboard Hot 100	70

== Certifications and sales ==
Certifications and sales for "Stay with Me"
Region	Certification	Certified units/sales
Australia (ARIA)	14× Platinum	980,000^{‡}
Austria (IFPI Austria)	Platinum	30,000^{*}
Belgium (BRMA)	Platinum	30,000^{*}
Brazil (Pro-Música Brasil)	3× Diamond	750,000^{‡}
Canada (Music Canada)	Diamond	800,000^{‡}
Denmark (IFPI Danmark)	5× Platinum	450,000^{‡}
Germany (BVMI)	5× Gold	750,000^{‡}
Italy (FIMI)	4× Platinum	200,000^{‡}
Japan (RIAJ)	Gold	100,000^{*}
Mexico (AMPROFON)	Gold	30,000^{*}
Netherlands (NVPI)	3× Platinum	60,000^{^}
New Zealand (RMNZ)	8× Platinum	240,000^{‡}
Norway (IFPI Norway)	7× Platinum	420,000^{‡}
Portugal (AFP)	2× Platinum	20,000^{‡}
Spain (Promusicae)	4× Platinum	240,000^{‡}
Sweden (GLF)	8× Platinum	320,000^{‡}
Switzerland (IFPI Switzerland)	Platinum	30,000^{‡}
United Kingdom (BPI)	6× Platinum	3,600,000^{‡}
United States (RIAA)	Diamond	10,000,000^{‡}
Streaming
Denmark (IFPI Danmark)	2× Platinum	5,200,000^{†}
Spain (Promusicae)	Platinum	8,000,000^{†}
^{*} Sales figures based on certification alone.^{^} Shipments figures based on certification alone.^{‡} Sales+streaming figures based on certification alone.^{†} Streaming-only figures based on certification alone.

== Release history ==
Region	Date	Format	Label
United States	14 April 2014	Adult album alternative radio	Capitol
United States	14 April 2014	Hot adult contemporary radio	Capitol
United States	13 May 2014	Contemporary hit radio	Capitol
United Kingdom	18 May 2014	Digital download	Capitol
Worldwide	2 June 2014	Digital download (Darkchild remix)	Capitol

== See also ==
- List of best-selling singles in Australia
- List of number-one singles of 2014 (South Africa)
- List of Billboard Adult Contemporary number ones of 2014
