= List of number-one singles of 2014 (South Africa) =

The South African Airplay Chart ranks the best-performing singles in South Africa. Its data, published by Entertainment Monitoring Africa, is based collectively on each single's weekly airplay.

== List of number-one singles of 2014 ==
Date	Song	Artist(s)	Ref.
7 January	"Y-tujukuja"	Uhuru	
14 January	"Timber"	Pitbull featuring Kesha	
21 January	"Timber"	Pitbull featuring Kesha	
28 January	"Happy"	Pharrell Williams	
4 February	"Happy"	Pharrell Williams	
11 February	"Pluto (Remember You)"	DJ Clock featuring Beatenberg	
18 February	"Drunk in Love"	Beyoncé featuring Jay-Z	
25 February	"Pluto (Remember You)"	DJ Clock featuring Beatenberg	
4 March	"Pluto (Remember You)"	DJ Clock featuring Beatenberg	
11 March	"Pluto (Remember You)"	DJ Clock featuring Beatenberg	
18 March	"Pluto (Remember You)"	DJ Clock featuring Beatenberg	
25 March	"Pluto (Remember You)"	DJ Clock featuring Beatenberg	
1 April	"Pluto (Remember You)"	DJ Clock featuring Beatenberg	
8 April	"Pluto (Remember You)"	DJ Clock featuring Beatenberg	
15 April	"Pluto (Remember You)"	DJ Clock featuring Beatenberg	
22 April	"Pluto (Remember You)"	DJ Clock featuring Beatenberg	
29 April	"Pluto (Remember You)"	DJ Clock featuring Beatenberg	
6 May	"Pluto (Remember You)"	DJ Clock featuring Beatenberg	
13 May	"Pluto (Remember You)"	DJ Clock featuring Beatenberg	
20 May	"Pluto (Remember You)"	DJ Clock featuring Beatenberg	
27 May	"Pluto (Remember You)"	DJ Clock featuring Beatenberg	
3 June	"Pluto (Remember You)"	DJ Clock featuring Beatenberg	
10 June	"Pluto (Remember You)"	DJ Clock featuring Beatenberg	
17 June	"Love Never Felt So Good"	Michael Jackson featuring Justin Timberlake	
24 June	"Pluto (Remember You)"	DJ Clock featuring Beatenberg	
1 July	"Pluto (Remember You)"	DJ Clock featuring Beatenberg	
8 July	"Caracara"	K.O. featuring Kid X	
15 July	"Caracara"	K.O. featuring Kid X	
22 July	"Stay with Me"	Sam Smith	
29 July	"Stay with Me"	Sam Smith	
5 August	"Stay with Me"	Sam Smith	
12 August	"Stay with Me"	Sam Smith	
19 August	"Stay with Me"	Sam Smith	
26 August	"Rafael"	Beatenberg	
2 September	"Rafael"	Beatenberg	
9 September	"Rafael"	Beatenberg	
16 September	"Rafael"	Beatenberg	
23 September	"Rafael"	Beatenberg	
30 September	"Rafael"	Beatenberg	
7 October	"Rafael"	Beatenberg	
14 October	"Rafael"	Beatenberg	
21 October	"Rafael"	Beatenberg	
28 October	"Rafael"	Beatenberg	
4 November	"Rafael"	Beatenberg	
11 November	"Rafael"	Beatenberg	
18 November	"Rafael"	Beatenberg	
25 November	"I'm Not the Only One"	Sam Smith	
2 December	"Rafael"	Beatenberg	
9 December	"Rafael"	Beatenberg	

== Number-one artists ==
Position	Artist	Weeks at No. 1
1	Beatenberg	34
2	DJ Clock	19
3	Sam Smith	6
4	Pitbull	2
4	Pharrell Williams	2
4	K.O.	2
4	Kesha	2
4	Kid X	2
5	Beyoncé	1
5	Michael Jackson	1
5	Uhuru	1
5	Jay-Z	1
5	Justin Timberlake	1

== See also ==
- 2014 in music
- Entertainment Monitoring Africa
