= U (Tourist album) =

Studio album by Tourist
- Released: 6 May 2016
- Genre: Electronic; post-dubstep
- Length: 43:26
- Label: Monday
- Producer: Tourist

Tourist chronology
Patterns (2014)	U (2016)	Everyday (2019)

U is the debut studio album by English electronic music producer Tourist, released on 6 May 2016 through Monday Records. The album received positive reviews from critics and reached the top 40 of the albums chart in Australia.

== Background ==
The album was inspired by the end of a four-year relationship that Tourist had been in.

== Critical reception ==
Professional ratings
Aggregate scores
Source	Rating
Metacritic	78/100
Review scores
Source	Rating
AllMusic	3.5/5 stars
The Line of Best Fit	7/10
Mixmag	8/10

U received a score of 78 out of 100 on review aggregator Metacritic based on four critics' reviews, indicating "generally favorable" reception. Paul Simpson of AllMusic found that Tourist "sticks with chopped-up vocal samples, resisting the straightforward pop route that Disclosure traveled on their full-lengths", and remarked that there is "certainly no shortage of gloomy British post-dubstep, but Phillips' work seems to have more of a purpose than just being mopey. His tracks are detailed and subtle, but also kind of perky". Q opined that "the mix is full of voices, all snipped up in fragments or rendered as blurred tones. The results lends his exquisite productions a haunting emotional resonance".

Grant Rindner of The Line of Best Fit called U "an intricate, melancholic and exceptionally well made LP" and felt that Tourist "has a deft touch and gift for melody, making U one of the more engaging electronic debuts we've seen this year". Mixmag's Ben Jolley concluded that the album "pieces together a narrative that reflects on a past relationship; sculpting electronica, garage and piano together effortlessly".

== Track listing ==
All tracks are written by William Phillips.

U track listing
No.	Title	Length
1.	"U"	3:57
2.	"To Have You Back"	4:34
3.	"Run"	5:59
4.	"Wait"	5:02
5.	"My Love (Interlude)"	2:19
6.	"Waves"	6:11
7.	"Too Late"	4:27
8.	"Foolish"	4:03
9.	"Separate Ways"	3:09
10.	"For Sarah"	3:45
Total length:		43:26

== Personnel ==
- William Phillips – producer, composition, recording
- Dan Parry – mixing
- Jacob Robinson – artwork
- LT Griffiths – artwork

== Charts ==
Chart performance for Tourist
Chart (2016)	Peak position
Australian Albums (ARIA)	39
Belgian Albums (Ultratop Flanders)	148
UK Album Downloads (OCC)	51
UK Dance Albums (OCC)	10
UK Independent Albums (OCC)	28
