= Tourist (musician) =

English electronic musician (born 1987)

- Born: William Edward Philips; 12 February 1987 (age 39); South London, England
- Origin: Cornwall, England
- Genres: Electronic
- Occupations: DJ; record producer; songwriter
- Years active: 2009–present
- Label: Monday

William Edward Phillips (born 12 February 1987), also known by his stage name Tourist, is an English electronic musician and songwriter.

== Biography ==
In 2015 he won the Grammy Award for Song of the Year for co-writing Sam Smith's "Stay with Me", along with James Napier. Since then, he has gone on to release six full-length albums, U (6 May 2016), Everyday (15 February 2019), Wild (18 October 2019), Inside Out (20 May 2022), Memory Morning (19 April 2024) and Music Is Invisible (5 December 2025) alongside several more EPs. He remains active as a writer, producer, and remixer, including remixing artists like Christine & The Queens, Hozier, Wolf Alice, and Chvrches.

== Discography ==
=== Albums ===
- U (2016)
- Everyday (2019)
- Wild (2019)
- Inside Out (2022)
- Memory Morning (2024)
- Music Is Invisible (2025)

=== EPs ===
- Tourist (2012)
- Tonight (2013)
- Patterns (2014)
- Wash (2017)
- Wild (Reworks) (2020)

=== Singles ===
List of singles, showing year released and album name
Title	Year	Album
"Wait"	2014	U
"Patterns" (featuring Lianne La Havas)	2014	Patterns EP
"Illuminate" (featuring Years & Years)	2014	Non-album single
"I Can't Keep Up" (featuring Will Heard)	2014	Patterns EP
"Holding On" (featuring Josef Salvat and Niia)	2015	Non-album single
"Waves"	2015	U
"To Have You Back"	2016	U
"Run"	2016	U
"We Stayed Up All Night" (featuring Ardyn)	2017	Wash EP
"Sleepwalking" (featuring Swim Mountain and Esther Joy)	2017	Wash EP
"Apollo"	2018	Everyday
"Someone Else"	2018	Everyday
"Hearts"	2018	Everyday
"Emily"	2019	Everyday
"Love Theme" (with Shura)	2019	Everyday
"Elixir"	2019	Wild
"Bunny"	2019	Wild
"Last"	2020	Non-album singles
"Siren"	2020	Non-album singles
"Avalanche"	2022	Inside Out
"Your Love"	2022	Inside Out
"Howl" (with Elderbrook)	2022	Non-album single

=== Songwriting and production credits ===
Year	Artist	Song	Album	Ref.
2012	Oshea	"Cloud9" feat. Myiah Lynnae	Non-album single	
2013	Javeon	"Give Up"	Javeon - EP	
2014	Sam Smith	"Stay with Me"	In the Lonely Hour	
2014	Jessie Ware	"Pieces"	Tough Love	
2015	Låpsley	"Hurt Me"	Long Way Home	
2015	Kacy Hill	"Arm's Length"	Bloo - EP	
2016	Ivan B	"Wish You Knew"	Non-album single	
2016	Colouring	"About You"	Symmetry - EP	
2016	Dillon Francis	"Anywhere" feat. Will Heard	Non-album single	
2016	Jones	"Waterloo"	New Skin	
2016	Frank Casino	"Christine's Song" feat. Simone Soares	Someone From Me	
2017	Ardyn	"Together"	Bloom - EP	
2017	Fred Falke	"Don't Give Up" feat. Jake Isaac	Non-album single	
2017	Ardyn	"Throwing Stones"	Bloom - EP	
2018	Chloe Howl	"Out of Luck"	Work - EP	
2019	Shura	"That's Me, Just a Sweet Melody"	Forevher	
2020	Jack Peñate	"Not Enough"	Non-album single	
2021	Dillon Francis	"Real Love" with Aleyna Tilki	Happy Machine	

=== Remixes ===
- Sharon Van Etten – "We Are Fine" (2012)
- Montevideo – "Castles" (2012)
- Sam Smith – "Safe with Me" (2013)
- Haim – "The Wire" (2013)
- Chvrches – "Lies" (2013)
- London Grammar – "Sights" (2014)
- Years & Years – "Desire" (2014)
- Shura – "What's It Gonna Be?" (2016)
- Christine and the Queens – "Saint Claude" (2016)
- Wolf Alice – "Don't Delete the Kisses" (2018)
- Rostam – "Gwan" (2018)
- Hozier – "Almost (Sweet Music)" (2019)
- Frere – "Often Wrong" (2020)
- Deftones – "Change (In the House of Flies)" (2020)
- Sofia Kourtesis – "La Perla" (2021)
- Swedish House Mafia and the Weeknd – "Moth to a Flame" (2022)
- Pheelz featuring BNXN – "Finesse" (2022)
- The Range – "Bicameral" (2022)
- Flume featuring Caroline Polachek – "Sirens" (2022)
