= Another Step (City Reign album) =

Studio album by City Reign
- Released: 25 February 2013
- Recorded: St Trinity Church, Salford
- Genre: Indie rock
- Length: 39.56
- Language: English
- Label: Car Boot Records
- Producer: Sam Jones

Another Step is the debut album from the Manchester indie rock band City Reign, released 25 February 2013. The album was recorded in St Trinity Church, Salford with producer Sam Jones. The album was released on the band's own record label Car Boot Records. Before the album was released, the track "Ahead of Ideas" was released as a single in 2012. Another song on the album Anchor was debuted on BBC Radio 6 Music by Steve Lamacq on 28 January 2013.

Another Step was recorded and mixed by Sam Jones at St Trinity Church, Salford and Band on The Wall, Manchester. It was mastered by Paul O'Brien at POB Audio, Manchester. The photograph for the cover was created by Louise Cowley.

Professional ratings
Review scores
Source	Rating
Acoustic	(positive)
Clash	7/10 stars
Uncut	5/10 stars

== Track listing ==
All tracks are written by City Reign.

No.	Title	Length
1.	"Anchor"	2:57
2.	"Making Plans"	3:05
3.	"Out In The Cold"	2:42
4.	"Sleep Easy"	3:12
5.	"The Line"	4:25
6.	"Retaliate"	3:52
7.	"See What It's Worth"	3:20
8.	"Stay Where You Are"	3:31
9.	"Ahead Of Ideas"	4:50
10.	"Daybreak"	4:26
11.	"Anywhere, Anyway"	3:19

== Credits ==
- Produced by Sam Jones
- Recorded and mixed by Sam Jones at St Trinity Church, Salford and Band on The Wall, Manchester
- Mastered by Paul O'Brien at POB Audio, Manchester
- Photography by Louise Cowley
