= Like I Can =

2014 single by Sam Smith

Single by Sam Smith

from the album In the Lonely Hour
- Released: 5 December 2014
- Recorded: 2013
- Genre: Power pop
- Length: 2:47
- Label: Capitol; Method
- Songwriters: Sam Smith; Matt Prime
- Producers: Steve Fitzmaurice; Jimmy Napes; Mojam

Sam Smith singles chronology
"I'm Not the Only One" (2014)	"Like I Can" (2014)	"Have Yourself a Merry Little Christmas" (2014)

"Like I Can" is a song by the English singer Sam Smith. It was released as a digital download on 5 December 2014 as the fifth single from their debut studio album, In the Lonely Hour (2014). The song was written by Smith and Matt Prime and produced by Steve Fitzmaurice, Jimmy Napes and Mojam. It debuted and peaked at number 9 in the United Kingdom, becoming Smith's fifth UK top 10 single.

== Background, composition and inspiration ==
On 24 October 2014, Smith announced via Twitter that they would be releasing "Like I Can" as the fifth single from their debut album In the Lonely Hour. They posted, "Incredibly happy to announce that my next single will be LIKE I CAN!!".

The song's central theme can be interpreted to be about lost or unrequited love. The singer describes different types of people that may approach their love interest but emphasizes that no one will love them as deeply as the singer does.

"Like I Can" is a power pop song written in the key of G♯ minor (sheet music originally published in G minor) at 100bpm. Smith's vocals span from F_{4} to D_{6}.

== Commercial performance ==
"Like I Can" peaked at number 9 on the UK Singles Chart, giving Smith their fifth UK top 10 single. It was the 100th biggest-selling song of 2014 in the United Kingdom, as well as the 58th biggest in 2015. It has also charted at number 19 in New Zealand, number 20 in Australia, and number 99 in the United States.

== Music video ==
The music video is in black and white and features Smith and several men on what appears to be a stag party.

== Live performances ==
Smith performed the song on 9 November 2014, on the fifth live results show of series 11 of The X Factor.

== Track listing ==
Digital download – EP
No.	Title	Length
1.	"Like I Can" (Radio Mix)	2:47
2.	"Like I Can" (Artful Remix)	4:34
3.	"Like I Can" (Jonas Rathsman Remix)	7:00
4.	"Like I Can" (iLL BLU Remix)	6:30

== Covers ==
On 12 October 2015, Jordan Smith and Regina Love covered as a duet battle through song choice selection in The Voice.

On 25 February 2016, Trent Harmon covered the song during the Top 10 round on the fifteenth season of American Idol.

On 24 October 2016, Dave Moisan sang this song during the knockout rounds in The Voice.

On 4 April 2023, Jerome Godwin III and Talia Smith covered as a duet battle through song choice selection in The Voice.

== Appearances in media ==
In mid-August 2021, the song went viral on TikTok, appearing in more than 2.4M videos as of September 25, 2021 at 6:59 PM EDT. This song also previously went viral on the same platform in May 2020.

== Charts ==
=== Weekly charts ===
Initial chart performance for "Like I Can"
Chart (2014–2015)	Peak position
Australia (ARIA)	20
Austria (Ö3 Austria Top 40)	18
Belgium (Ultratip Bubbling Under Flanders)	7
Belgium (Ultratip Bubbling Under Wallonia)	9
Canada Hot 100 (Billboard)	53
Canada AC (Billboard)	14
Canada CHR/Top 40 (Billboard)	41
Canada Hot AC (Billboard)	18
Czech Republic Airplay (ČNS IFPI)	84
Czech Republic Singles Digital (ČNS IFPI)	17
Denmark (Tracklisten)	12
Euro Digital Songs (Billboard)	17
Finland Airplay (Radiosoittolista)	33
Germany (GfK)	45
Hungary (Rádiós Top 40)	4
Hungary (Stream Top 40)	19
Iceland (RÚV)	2
Ireland (IRMA)	11
Italy (FIMI)	59
Lebanon (OLT20)	14
Mexico Ingles Airplay (Billboard)	15
Netherlands (Dutch Top 40)	8
Netherlands (Single Top 100)	22
New Zealand (Recorded Music NZ)	19
Norway (VG-lista)	30
Scottish Singles Sales (Official Charts)	8
Slovakia Airplay (ČNS IFPI)	38
Slovakia Singles Digital (ČNS IFPI)	20
Slovenia (SloTop50)	16
South Africa Airplay (EMA)	6
Sweden (Sverigetopplistan)	25
UK Singles (Official Charts)	9
US Billboard Hot 100	99
US Adult Contemporary (Billboard)	17
US Adult Pop Airplay (Billboard)	26
US Dance Club Songs (Billboard)	5
US Pop Airplay (Billboard)	27

2021 chart performance for "Like I Can"
Chart (2021)	Peak position
Global 200 (Billboard)	70
Norway (VG-lista)	16
Sweden (Sverigetopplistan)	19
Switzerland (Schweizer Hitparade)	33

=== Year-end charts ===
2014 year-end chart performance for "Like I Can"
Chart (2014)	Position
UK Singles (Official Charts Company)	100

2015 year-end chart performance for "Like I Can"
Chart (2015)	Position
Denmark (Tracklisten)	45
Hungary (Rádiós Top 40)	46
Netherlands (Dutch Top 40)	33
Netherlands (Single Top 100)	71
UK Singles (Official Charts Company)	58
US Adult Contemporary (Billboard)	43

== Certifications ==
Certifications for "Like I Can"
Region	Certification	Certified units/sales
Australia (ARIA)	5× Platinum	350,000^{‡}
Austria (IFPI Austria)	Platinum	30,000^{*}
Brazil (Pro-Música Brasil)	Platinum	60,000^{‡}
Canada (Music Canada)	3× Platinum	240,000^{‡}
Denmark (IFPI Danmark)	2× Platinum	180,000^{‡}
Germany (BVMI)	Gold	200,000^{‡}
Italy (FIMI)	Gold	25,000^{‡}
New Zealand (RMNZ)	3× Platinum	90,000^{‡}
Norway (IFPI Norway)	2× Platinum	120,000^{‡}
Spain (Promusicae)	Gold	30,000^{‡}
Sweden (GLF)	Platinum	40,000^{‡}
United Kingdom (BPI)	3× Platinum	1,800,000^{‡}
United States (RIAA)	Platinum	1,000,000^{‡}
^{*} Sales figures based on certification alone.^{‡} Sales+streaming figures based on certification alone.

== Release history ==
Release dates for "Like I Can"
Region	Date	Format	Label
Australia	5 December 2014	Digital download	Capitol; Method
Ireland	5 December 2014	Digital download	Capitol; Method
United Kingdom	7 December 2014	Digital download	Capitol; Method
Belgium	8 December 2014	Digital download	Capitol; Method
Italy	27 February 2015	Mainstream radio	Universal
United States	19 May 2015	Mainstream radio	Capitol
United States	19 May 2015	Rhythmic radio	Capitol
