= Salute (musician) =

- Born: Felix Angyumanu Nyajo; Vienna, Austria
- Origin: Manchester
- Occupations: musician; record producer; DJ; songwriter; singer
- Years active: 2011-present

Felix Angyumanu Nyajo (known professionally as Salute) is an Austrian DJ and record producer based in England, who is currently signed to English independent record label, Ninja Tune. They (Note: Nyajo is non-binary and uses they/them pronouns.) initially gained attention for their remixes of Aaliyah's "Rock the Boat" and Sam Smith's "Money on My Mind" in the early 2010s, produced and released during their adolescence around the age of 16.

To date, they have released nine EP's; Lionheart (2013), Fields (2013), Gold Rush (2015), Condition I (2018), Condition II (2019), Condition III (2019), lyali (2020), Ultra Pool (2022), and Shield (2023) and two studio albums; their mini-album, My Heart (2016) and full-length debut, True Magic on July 12, 2024, which would go on to chart at No. 5 on the UK Dance Albums Chart upon its arrival.

== Life and career ==
Felix Angyumanu Nyajo was born in Aspern to a cab driver and a nurse and has an older brother. Their parents, who spoke Hausa, moved there from Belgrade to escape the Yugoslav Wars after previously relocating from Nigeria in the early 1980s. Growing up, their family would take regular trips to Colindale where Nyajo's cousin and their family lived. They also regularly attended church service as their parents were Pentecostals. While in Aspern, Nyajo suffered from regular racism and was attacked aged 14 by a pair of racists. They compiled their first works on their parents' computer using a pirated copy of FL Studio they had obtained aged 13.

Initially, Nyajo uploaded tracks to their SoundCloud account as "sxlute" and began sharing music via Bandcamp in 2012. Their first work to receive press attention was a remix of Aaliyah's "Rock the Boat". After a blog ran a piece on it, FM4 invited them in for an interview and then started playing their music. Nyajo then began DJing when they were seventeen using FL Studio and released the EP Lionheart in 2013. After Capitol Records enlisted them for a remix of "Money on My Mind" by Sam Smith, they waited until the last possible minute to start on it and then imitated a remix Flume had just uploaded. In a 2017 interview with Austrian Music Export, they stated that although it had got them "a lot of bookings and contacts at the beginning", they thought it was "pretty shit" and had "sworn never to do anything like that again".

To escape the racism they were experiencing in Austria, Nyajo moved to Brighton for university later in 2014, where they studied music production and sound engineering. They left the following year, and in November 2015, they released the Gold Rush EP, which included "Colourblind" featuring Abra. Nyajo then moved to Manchester with a friend in 2016 on the grounds that it was cheaper to live there. After finding a dwelling next to Manchester Arena, Nyajo released the mini-album My Heart. In late 2017, their grandmother and grandfather died. Nyajo responded by producing a trio of EPs, Condition I, Condition II, and Condition III, which came out between 2018 and 2019. In an April 2019 interview with Vice, they described the EPs as consisting of "memories", "pain and feeing shitty" [sic], and "hope".

In May 2018, they contributed keyboards and programming for Charli XCX's "5 in the Morning". They released the EPs Ultra Pool and Shield in August 2022 and May 2023. Shield was their first to include their own vocals and charted at number 12 on the Official Vinyl Singles Chart the following October. Shield included "Run Away With You", which featured No Rome, "Feels Like My Hands Are On Fire", which was co-produced by George Daniel, and "Peach" with Sammy Virji. In December 2023, Nyajo was nominated for Best Electronic/Dance Act at the 2024 MOBO Awards. The following July, Nyajo released the album True Magic, a concept album based on the concept of racing Japanese cars. The album featured contributions from Rina Sawayama, Karma Kid, Disclosure, Sam Gellaitry, なかむらみなみ, Empress Of, Léa Sen, Piri, and Leilah, most of whom were friends of theirs. It charted at number 5 on the UK Dance Albums Chart.

In June 2026, they released "Check Check" as a single for their album Infinite Passion. The album is scheduled to release on June 12, 2026.

== Personal life ==
In March 2022, Nyajo announced that they would be introducing an inclusion rider to their contracts for live performances. It required that at least one act on any lineup they were performing on should be from an underrepresented group approved by them, such as female, Black, queer, or genderqueer. If a promoter did not adhere to this, Nyajo would not play the show. Explaining themselves to Billboard in July 2024, they stated the following:

I was playing a show in Newcastle in the north of England, and I got there and every DJ on the lineup was white and male. It wouldn’t have been an issue for me if they were good DJs, but pretty much everyone sucked. They were like, really bad. Basically, the promoter had just booked his best friends to play. I was there [thinking] like, “So many of my girl mates, so many of my queer mates, so many of my Black mates would have absolutely killed this night.” But it’s just kind of how it is, where a promoter will just book his mates rather than booking a good DJ. I got back to my hotel and texted my agent like, “I want to make sure that I am performing among more people who look like me, and among more people who are nonbinary and trans, etc.” I found a template for an inclusion rider online, and it basically stipulates that 30% of the lineup of any stage I play on has to be from an underrepresented group, and has to be approved by me.

Nyajo first became interested in production after hearing the Sonic Rush soundtrack, taking further inspiration coming from the SSX Tricky and FIFA Street 2 soundtracks. In 2013, they were taking influence from Rustie, James Blake, Hudson Mohawke, soul music, and 1990s hip hop music. In an interview with Austrian Music Export in April 2023, they noted that they were inspired to institute their inclusion rider after seeing a "couple of people in America" institute similar conditions.

== Discography ==
=== Studio albums ===
- My Heart (2016)
- True Magic (2024)

=== EPs ===
- Lionheart (2013)
- Fields (2013)
- Gold Rush (2015)
- Condition I (2018)
- Condition II (2019)
- Condition III (2019)
- lyali (2020)
- Ultra Pool (2022)
- Shield (2023)

=== Compilations ===
- Condition (2019)
