= Safe with Me =

Song by Sam Smith

from the album Nirvana
- Released: 4 October 2013
- Recorded: 2012–13
- Genre: Electro; R&B
- Length: 3:04
- Label: PMR; Capitol
- Songwriters: Sam Smith; Ben Ash
- Producer: Two Inch Punch

"Safe with Me" is a song by the English singer Sam Smith, from their debut extended play (EP) Nirvana (2013). It peaked at No. 86 on the UK singles chart. The song was written by Sam Smith and Two Inch Punch, the latter also producing the song.

== Track listing ==
No.	Title	Writer(s)	Producer(s)	Length
1.	"Safe with Me"	Sam Smith; Ben Ash	Two Inch Punch	3:04

== Credits and personnel ==
- Lead vocals – Sam Smith
- Producers – Two Inch Punch
- Lyrics – Sam Smith, Ben Ash
- Label: PMR

== Charts ==
Chart (2013)	Peak position
UK Singles (Official Charts Company)	86
