= Money on My Mind =

Single by Sam Smith

from the album In the Lonely Hour
- Released: 12 February 2014
- Recorded: 2013
- Genre: House
- Length: 3:14
- Label: Capitol
- Songwriters: Ben Ash; Sam Smith
- Producer: Two Inch Punch

Sam Smith singles chronology
"When It's Alright" (2013)	"Money on My Mind" (2014)	"Stay with Me" (2014)

"Money on My Mind" is a song by the English singer Sam Smith, and the second single from their debut studio album, In the Lonely Hour (2014). The song was released in Italy on 27 December 2013. It was later released in the UK on 12 February 2014 and in Germany on 16 February 2014.

The song peaked at number one on the UK singles chart and number 4 on the Irish Singles Chart. The song also charted in Austria, Belgium, Denmark, Germany and the Netherlands. The song was written by Sam Smith and Ben Ash, produced by Two Inch Punch (Ben Ash) and mixed by Steve Fitzmaurice, with vocals recorded by Steve Fitzmaurice and Darren Heelis.

== Music video ==
A music video to accompany the release of "Money on My Mind" was directed by Jamie Thraves and first released onto YouTube on 12 January 2014 at a total length of three minutes and thirty-two seconds. The video shows Smith performing the track in Las Vegas, as people win and lose money in the casino capital.

== Critical reception ==
Robert Copsey of Digital Spy gave the song a mixed review, calling its chorus "a lazy search for a hook." In his debut piece for Noisey, Robert Christgau reviewed In the Lonely Hour and cited Money on My Mind as a highlight of the album, calling it "an emotionally complex reflection on his record deal".

== Formats and track listings ==
- CD single
1. "Money on My Mind" – 3:14
2. "Money on My Mind" (MK Remix) – 6:35
- Digital download (EP)
1. "Money on My Mind" – 3:14
2. "Money on My Mind" (MK Remix) – 6:35
3. "Money on My Mind" (Le Youth Remix) – 3:03
4. "Money on My Mind" (Salute Remix) – 3:42

== Charts ==
=== Weekly charts ===
Chart (2014–2015)	Peak position
Australia (ARIA)	51
Austria (Ö3 Austria Top 40)	11
Belgium (Ultratop 50 Flanders)	18
Belgium Dance (Ultratop Flanders)	4
Belgium (Ultratip Bubbling Under Wallonia)	8
Belgium Dance (Ultratop Wallonia)	9
CIS Airplay (TopHit)	15
Czech Republic Airplay (ČNS IFPI)	21
Czech Republic Singles Digital (ČNS IFPI)	16
Denmark (Tracklisten)	18
Euro Digital Songs (Billboard)	2
Finland Airplay (Radiosoittolista)	38
France (SNEP)	31
Germany (GfK)	11
Hungary (Rádiós Top 40)	23
Iceland (RÚV)	9
Ireland (IRMA)	4
Italy (FIMI)	51
Japan Hot 100 (Billboard)	78
Lebanon (The Official Lebanese Top 20)	17
Luxembourg Digital Songs (Billboard)	4
Mexico Ingles Airplay (Billboard)	45
Netherlands (Dutch Top 40)	32
Netherlands (Single Top 100)	33
New Zealand (Recorded Music NZ)	12
Romania (Airplay 100)	76
Russia Airplay (TopHit)	13
Scottish Singles Sales (Official Charts)	1
Slovakia Airplay (ČNS IFPI)	30
Slovakia Singles Digital (ČNS IFPI)	16
Slovenia (SloTop50)	23
Spain (Promusicae)	33
Sweden (Sverigetopplistan)	18
Switzerland (Schweizer Hitparade)	17
UK Singles (Official Charts)	1
Ukraine Airplay (TopHit)	57
US Bubbling Under Hot 100 (Billboard)	7

=== Year-end charts ===
Chart (2014)	Position
Belgium (Ultratop 50 Flanders)	83
Denmark (Tracklisten)	27
France (SNEP)	114
Germany (Official German Charts)	62
Italy (FIMI)	95
Netherlands (Dutch Top 40)	135
Netherlands (Single Top 100)	60
Russia Airplay (TopHit)	114
Spain (PROMUSICAE Streaming)	78
Sweden (Sverigetopplistan)	60
Ukraine Airplay (TopHit)	121
UK Singles (Official Charts Company)	18

== Certifications and sales ==
Region	Certification	Certified units/sales
Australia (ARIA)	Platinum	70,000^{‡}
Austria (IFPI Austria)	Gold	15,000^{*}
Brazil (Pro-Música Brasil)	Platinum	60,000^{‡}
Canada (Music Canada)	Platinum	80,000^{‡}
Germany (BVMI)	Gold	150,000^{^}
Italy (FIMI)	Platinum	30,000^{‡}
Netherlands (NVPI)	2× Platinum	40,000^{^}
New Zealand (RMNZ)	2× Platinum	60,000^{‡}
Norway (IFPI Norway)	Platinum	60,000^{‡}
Spain (Promusicae)	Gold	20,000^{*}
Sweden (GLF)	2× Platinum	80,000^{‡}
Switzerland (IFPI Switzerland)	Gold	15,000^{‡}
United Kingdom (BPI)	2× Platinum	1,309,196
United States (RIAA)	Platinum	1,000,000^{‡}
Streaming
Denmark (IFPI Danmark)	2× Platinum	5,200,000^{†}
Spain (Promusicae)	Gold	4,000,000^{†}
^{*} Sales figures based on certification alone.^{^} Shipments figures based on certification alone.^{‡} Sales+streaming figures based on certification alone.^{†} Streaming-only figures based on certification alone.

== Release history ==
Region	Date	Format	Label
Italy	27 December 2013	Contemporary hit radio	Capitol
Germany	12 February 2014	Digital download	Capitol
United Kingdom	16 February 2014	Digital download	Capitol
