= Oblivion (2013 soundtrack) =

Oblivion (Original Motion Picture Soundtrack)

Soundtrack album by M83, Anthony Gonzalez, and Joseph Trapanese
- Released: April 16, 2013
- Recorded: 2012–2013
- Studios: Newman Scoring Stage, 20th Century Fox Studios; Henson Recording Studios; Remote Control Productions; Conway Studios; NRG Studios; AIR Studios
- Genres: Electronic; orchestral
- Length: 69:06 (standard); 113:36 (deluxe edition)
- Label: Back Lot Music
- Producers: Anthony Gonzalez; Joseph Trapanese; Bryan Lawson

M83 chronology
Hurry Up, We're Dreaming (2011)	Oblivion (Original Motion Picture Soundtrack) (2013)	Junk (2016)

Singles from Oblivion (Original Motion Picture Soundtrack)
- 1. "Oblivion" Released: April 2, 2013

Oblivion (Original Motion Picture Soundtrack) is the soundtrack to the 2013 film of the same name featuring the original score composed by Anthony Gonzalez of the French electronic music project M83 and Joseph Trapanese. However, M83 was credited for the soundtrack. The album features electronic and orchestral music that was recorded specifically for the film for more than a year. Aside from the score, a six-minute title track was released as the single from the film on April 2, 2013. The soundtrack was released in digital and physical formats on April 16 by Back Lot Music, along with a deluxe edition released on the same day. It was released on vinyl by Mondo on April 30.

== Development ==
The original music is composed by the French electronic act M83, which consisted solely of Anthony Gonzalez at the time. Director Kosinski wanted M83 to score the film, recalling his first treatment on Oblivion from 2005, which listed M83 as the soundtrack's composer, and his collaboration with Daft Punk for Tron: Legacy (2010) on "bringing artists from outside the film business to create an original sound for the film" worked out well as the score received critical acclaim. However, he felt Daft Punk's music did not make sense with the film, and it had to be an artist whose music fit the themes and story he wanted to tell. He felt that M83's music was fresh, original, big, and epic, but at the same time emotional, and since it is "a very emotional film" he thought that the music would be apt for the film.

Gonzalez did not know much about the film and started to write the score after reading the script, and experimented with the music after the final cut, so that "it switched to another vibe and change stuff altogether". At first he did not have any experience in scoring for a film, hence he was guided by Joseph Trapanese, who additionally co-wrote the score. Gonzalez explained that "I worked with Joseph a lot, and he's very particular about the music in his movies, so we spent a lot of time talking about music and working the arrangements together." Trapanese first came to Kosinski's attention when he collaborated with Daft Punk on Tron: Legacy as arranger and orchestrator.

The duo worked on the film's music for more than a year, having written more than one hour and forty-five minutes of the film's music. Speaking to Pitchfork, Gonzalez recalled that he was initially skeptical about scoring the film, as with such a big film, he cannot please himself, but had to please the director, studio, and tons of people involved in the film. He almost quit the film, and had gone through all types of emotions. He further stated that the studio told him that his music "would be too indie for the film" and that the film needed "more bigger, more orchestral". He eventually had to do quick turnovers if some cues did not appeal to the studio or the directors, and realized that the ideas of studio-based music could not work well as "it's Hollywood and because it's a $150 million dollar budget". He also feared that people would dislike the soundtrack because it was different from M83's work and expect a new album from the band.

The album cover features the credits of "Original Music by M83", and "Score Composed by Anthony Gonzalez and Joseph Trapanese". He did not want to involve M83's name, but since Universal Pictures wanted to push M83 because of the success of "Midnight City", Gonzalez said that "It's funny because sometimes big studios don't give a shit about you, but when you're nominated for the Grammys, you start receiving emails like, 'Oh, congratulations. We're excited about the soundtrack.' I'm like, 'You didn't give a shit about me two months ago when I got the job, and now you're just acting like a ...' It makes you feel like there's something wrong with the movie industry—you can write that, I don't care."

== Release ==
A preview of the track "StarWaves" was reported first by Entertainment Weekly, where the track was released on the artist's SoundCloud channel on March 6, 2013, with the complete track list of the score was released on the same date. The album was preceded by the single "Oblivion" released on April 2, 2013. It was performed by Norwegian singer-songwriter and record producer Susanne Sundfør, who co-wrote the lyrics for the song with Gonzalez. A day before the film's release, Gonzalez and Sundfør (in her television debut) performed the song on Jimmy Kimmel Live! as a part of the promotions. The album was released by Back Lot Music on April 16, 2013. A deluxe edition of the soundtrack was released the same day exclusively through iTunes, which featured additional 13 tracks.

In April 2013, Mondo announced the distribution of the film's soundtrack in 180-gram double disc vinyl LP, which additionally features artwork from Killian Eng. The vinyl album was released on Mondo's official website on April 30, and was made available to retail stores on May 28.

== Track listing ==
Standard edition
No.	Title	Length
1.	"Jack's Dream"	1:22
2.	"Waking Up"	4:09
3.	"Tech 49"	5:58
4.	"StarWaves"	3:41
5.	"Odyssey Rescue"	4:08
6.	"Earth 2077"	2:22
7.	"Losing Control"	3:56
8.	"Canyon Battle"	5:57
9.	"Radiation Zone"	4:11
10.	"You Can't Save Her"	4:56
11.	"Raven Rock"	4:33
12.	"I'm Sending You Away"	5:38
13.	"Ashes of Our Fathers"	3:30
14.	"Temples of Our Gods"	3:14
15.	"Fearful Odds"	3:09
16.	"Undimmed by Time, Unbound by Death"	2:26
17.	"Oblivion" (featuring Susanne Sundfør)	5:56
Total length:		69:06

Deluxe edition (iTunes release)
No.	Title	Length
1.	"Jack's Dream"	1:30
2.	"Waking Up"	4:18
3.	"Supercell"	4:19
4.	"Tech 49"	6:01
5.	"The Library"	3:27
6.	"Horatius"	2:31
7.	"StarWaves"	3:41
8.	"Hydrorig"	2:23
9.	"Crater Lake"	1:28
10.	"Unidentified Object"	2:32
11.	"Odyssey Rescue"	4:12
12.	"Return from Delta"	2:22
13.	"Retrieval"	6:48
14.	"Earth 2077"	2:23
15.	"Revelations"	1:43
16.	"Drone Attack"	3:26
17.	"Return to Empire State"	6:41
18.	"Losing Control"	3:57
19.	"Canyon Battle"	5:58
20.	"Radiation Zone"	4:12
21.	"You Can't Save Her"	4:59
22.	"Welcome Back"	1:47
23.	"Raven Rock"	4:35
24.	"Knife Fight in a Phone Booth"	4:39
25.	"I'm Sending You Away"	5:40
26.	"Ashes of Our Fathers"	3:32
27.	"Temples of Our Gods"	3:16
28.	"Fearful Odds"	3:11
29.	"Undimmed by Time, Unbound by Death"	2:27
30.	"Oblivion" (featuring Susanne Sundfør)	5:57
Total length:		113:36

== Critical reception ==
Professional ratings
Aggregate scores
Source	Rating
Metacritic	55/100
Review scores
Source	Rating
Allmusic	3.5/5 stars
Consequence of Sound	2/5 stars
Digital Spy	4/5 stars
Filmtracks.com	2/5 stars
Pitchfork Media	(4.5/10)
Under the Radar	6/10 stars

Aggregator Metacritic, which uses a weighted average, assigned Oblivion (Original Motion Picture Soundtrack) a score of 55 out of 100 based on 4 critics, indicating "mixed or average reviews".

Heather Phares of AllMusic rated the album 4.5 (out of 5) saying "Oblivion resembles a blockbuster soundtrack more than an M83 album may disappoint some of Gonzalez's fans, but it means that he and Trapanese succeeded in making the film's music what it needed to be." Simon Reynolds of Digital Spy gave a positive review saying "Gonzalez's Oblivion stands up as both an evocative score for film music buffs and an excellent M83 record in its own right". James Southall of Movie Wave wrote "it's certainly not on the level of Inception or Tron: Legacy, but is several steps ahead of its other most obvious influence, The Dark Knight Rises. And while it's all a bit simplistic from a compositional perspective, there are a few touches here and there – like the strings at the beginning of “Tech 49” – that go beyond anywhere an actual Zimmer-branded score would".

Norman Fleischer of Nothing but Hope and Passion wrote "M83's Oblivion score might even work without seeing the movie – which is quite okay, but not a must-see. All in all it's a lovely joint venture of different musical worlds. And it might not only help you creating a movie on your own in your head but also.to open yourself up for these worlds. Gonzalez and Trapanese are bridging the gap between classic and electronic – and it looks like everyone is winning with this combination." Alee Karim of Under the Radar rated 6/10 to the album and wrote: "M83's audience knows they could nail this and are probably excited for this score for that very reason. But instead of a whole homemade M83 cake, we get an M83 glaze atop the sheet cake of a standard Hollywood film soundtrack. One can't help but wonder what an M83 film score that wasn't forced to play it safe could be. Here's hoping they get another chance, because there's a lot of promise here."

In contrast, Brian Howe of Pitchfork gave 4.5 out of 10 and wrote "Gonzalez is a masterful stylist, but an average composer at best, which makes the subtraction of his style rather fatal for the Oblivion OST as a standalone experience. The music is more unmemorable than bad, though occasionally Gonzalez's inexperience, which seems to limit what Trapanese can do as well." Howe further concluded, "The people who buy action-movie OSTs—whomever they are—should be satisfied. But to M83 fans, this will just be a cautionary tale about an indie auteur turning his back on little machines he can control and getting mauled by a huge one—Hollywood focus groups—which he can't." Writing for Consequence, Dan Caffrey rated two stars, and said: "In defense of the composers, the constant crescendos undoubtedly become more dynamic and less monotonous when they're accompanied by visuals. Then again, there are soundtracks that break free from their respective films and can be enjoyed on their own; Jaws, Halloween, and There Will Be Blood all come to mind. But like Daft Punk's soundtrack for Tron: Legacy before it (a film also directed by Joseph Kosinski), Oblivion is symbiotically dependent on the silver screen. Let's hope the movie's decent." Filmtracks.com awarded the album a scroe of two out of five, saying "the score for Oblivion is nowhere near the spectacle of Tron: Legacy".

== Chart performance ==
Chart (2013)	Peak position
UK Album Downloads (OCC)	83
UK Soundtrack Albums (OCC)	5
US Billboard 200	119
US Soundtrack Albums (Billboard)	5

== Credits ==
Credits adapted from CD liner notes.

- Original music composed by – M83
- Score composed by – Anthony Gonzalez, Joseph Trapanese
- Score production – Anthony Gonzalez, Bryan Lawson, Joseph Trapanese
- Musical assistance – Jason Lazarus, Josh Humphrey
- Recordist – Vincent Cirilli
- Analog synth programming – Josh Humphrey
- Mixing – Satoshi Noguchi
- Mixing assistance – Miguel Lara, Peter Nelson, Seth Waldmann
- Mastering – Ray Staff
- Music editor – Bryan Lawson, David Channing
- Additional music editor – Sam Zeines
- Music contractor – Gina Zimmitti, Sandy DeCrescent
- Music co-ordinator – Booker White
- Executive producer – Joseph Kosinski
- Executive in charge of music (Universal Pictures) – Mike Knobloch
- Music business affairs (Universal Pictures) – Philip M. Cohen
- Product manager (Back Lot Music) – Jake Voulgarides
- Music supervision (Universal Pictures) – Rachel Levy

Instruments

- Bass – Bruce Morgenthaler, Chris Kollgaard, Drew Dembowski, Geoff Osika, Mike Valerio, Nico Abondolo, Tim Eckert, Ed Meares
- Bass guitar – Sean Hurley
- Cello – Andrew Shulman, Tony Cooke, Armen Ksajikian, Cecilia Tsan, Chris Ermacoff, Dane Little, Dennis Karmazyn, Kim Scholes, Giovanna Clayton, Paul Cohen, Tim Landauer, Tim Loo, Trevor Handy, Steve Erdody
- Drums – Ilan Rubin, Loic Maurin
- French Horn – Allen Fogle, Ben Jaber, Daniel Kelley, Danielle Ondarza, Dylan Hart, J.G. Miller, Jenny Kim, Justin Hageman, Laura Brenes, Mark Adams, Phil Yao, Steve Becknell
- Guitar – Andrew Synowiec, Toshi Yanagi
- Percussion – Alan Estes, Bob Zimmitti, Dan Greco, Don Williams, Wade Culbreath
- Piano – Mike Lang
- Timpani – Greg Goodall, Peter Limonick
- Trombone – Alan Kaplan, Alex Iles, Andy Martin, Bill Reichenbach, Charlie Loper, Phil Teele, Steve Holtman, Bill Booth
- Trumpet – Jon Lewis, Malcom McNab, Rob Schaer
- Tuba – Doug Tornquist, Jim Self
- Viola – Alma Fernandez, Caroline Buckman, Darrin McCann, David Walther, Kate Reddish, Keith Greene, Luke Mauer, Lynne Richburg, Marlow Fisher, Matt Funes, Rob Brophy, Roland Kato, Shawn Mann, Thomas Diener, Vicky Miskolczy, Brian Dembow
- Violin – Alyssa Park, Amy Wickman, Ana Landauer, Armen Anassian, Ashoka Thiagarajan, Belinda Broughton, Charlie Bisharat, Daphne Chen, Eun Mee Ahn, Grace Oh, Irina Voloshina, Jackie Brand, Joel Derouin, Josefina Vergara, Julie Gigante, Julie Rogers, Katia Popov, Kevin Kumar, Lis Sutton, Marc Sazer, Mark Robertson, Natalie Leggett, Neel Hammond, Nina Evtuhov, Phil Levy, Roger Wilkie, Sarah Thornblade, Serena McKinney, Songa Lee, Tammy Hatwan, Tereza Stanislav, Yelena Yegoryan, Bruce Dukov

Orchestra

- Orchestra conductor, arrangements – Joseph Trapanese
- Concertmaster – Belinda Broughton
- Recording – Joel Iwataki

Choir

- Alto – Amber Erwin, Angie Jaree, Donna Medine, Edie Lehmann Boddicker, Farah Kidwai, Karen Harper, Marijke van Niekerk, Sarah Lynch
- Bass – Alvin Chea, Bob Joyce, Christian Ebner, Eric Bradley, Jim Campbell, Jon Joyce, Michael Geiger, Randy Crenshaw
- Soprano – Diane Freiman Reynolds, Elin Carlson, Gaby Santinelli, Jennifer Graham, Jessica Freedman, Joanna Bushnell, Teri Koide
- Tenor – Chris Gambol, Chris Mann, Fletcher Sheridan, Gerald White, Jasper Randall, Jeff Gunn, Steve Dunham, Walt Harrah
- Contractor – Jasper Randall
