= Oblivion (M83 song) =

Single by M83 featuring Susanne Sundfør

from the album Oblivion: Original Motion Picture Soundtrack
- Released: 26 March 2013
- Length: 5:56
- Label: Back Lot Music
- Songwriters: Anthony Gonzalez; Susanne Sundfør
- Producers: Anthony Gonzalez; Joseph Trapanese

M83 singles chronology
"Wait" (2012)	"Oblivion" (2013)	"Do It, Try It" (2016)

Susanne Sundfør singles chronology
"The Silicone Veil" (2012)	"Oblivion" (2013)	"Death Hanging" (2013)

Audio video
- "Oblivion" on YouTube

"Oblivion" is a song by French electronic music band M83 featuring lead vocals from Norwegian singer Susanne Sundfør. It was released as part of the film soundtrack album Oblivion: Original Motion Picture Soundtrack to accompany the film of the same name. It was composed by Anthony Gonzalez. The song peaked at number 114 in France.

== Composition ==
"Oblivion" has been classified as a "soaring ballad" that features "interstellar synths and cloud-surfing lead vocals" amidst a mixture of "M83's dream pop [and] more traditional string and horn arrangements." Rolling Stone observed that the song is "capped with a jazzy instrumental section, just like M83's 2011 hit 'Midnight City'", while it reminded Consequence of Sound of "Tangerine Dream's scores from the '80s". Featuring Sundfør's "booming vocals," the song's choir repeats "In the night, you'll hear me calling" over a "bombastic synth swell."

== Release and reception ==
"Oblivion" was released as a single on 26 March 2013, and later as part of the film soundtrack Oblivion: Original Motion Picture Soundtrack on 9 April. On the French SNEP singles chart, the song debuted at number 114 on the week of 20 April 2013 and lasted on the chart for three weeks. M83 and Susanne Sundfør performed the song live on 17 April 2013 on Jimmy Kimmel Live!, making it Sundfør's television debut in the United States. Along with M83 and Sundfør, it featured a drummer, bassist and string section. The performance was well received.

The Express Tribune encouraged viewers of Oblivion to "stick around for the credits that are set to M83's brilliant title song." Moviefone's Drew Taylor opined that it "might be the best theme song since "Skyfall". The Huffington Post compared it to the songs of Florence + The Machine, while Stereogum's Tom Breihan called it a "slow, stately, and gorgeous" collaboration. Mark Hogan of Spin magazine commented that the best part of the song was its outro, as it included "contemplative piano reminiscent of the Twin Peaks theme." Russ Fischer of /Film was more critical of the song, explaining that "this one doesn't do as much for me, as has the tenor of a lot of end credit songs that are tailored to be broadly appealing. Your mileage may vary, however... it'll send a lot of people dancing out of the theater, at the very least, and Sundfør's voice is quite pretty."

== Charts ==
Chart performance for "Oblivion"
Chart (2013)	Peak position
France (SNEP)	114
