= Reunion (M83 song) =

Single by M83

from the album Hurry Up, We're Dreaming
- Released: 5 February 2012
- Recorded: 2011
- Genre: New wave; dream pop; synth-pop; post-punk revival
- Length: 3:55
- Label: Naïve; Mute
- Songwriters: Anthony Gonzalez; Yann Gonzalez; Morgan Kibby
- Producers: Anthony Gonzalez; Justin Meldal-Johnsen

M83 singles chronology
| "Midnight City" (2011) | "Reunion" (2012) | "OK Pal" (2012) |

Music video
- "Reunion" on YouTube

"Reunion" is a song by French electronic music band M83. The track was released in the United Kingdom on 5 February 2012 as the second single from the group's sixth studio album, Hurry Up, We're Dreaming. The track was remixed by Polly Scattergood.

== Music video ==
The music video for M83s' "Reunion" has garnered over 45 million YouTube views since its release. The video is the second piece in a trilogy-arc beginning with "Midnight City" and completed by "Wait"; continuing the story of children with various psychic abilities as they are pursued by a shadowy organization.

The video starts out with the five children from "Midnight City" on the roof of a warehouse as night has fallen. Back in the location the children escaped from in "Midnight City" there is another psychic child - this one in a wheelchair, hooked up to a machine with leads attached. She somehow connects mentally with the youngest of the escaped children on the roof, causing her abilities to overload and send up a pillar of light. The organization is then able to track the pillar via technology to pinpoint the location of the escapees. The wheelchair-using child's efforts cause the incapacitation of the youngest escapee; her fellow children reluctantly abandon her unresponsive body and run.

The four remaining escaping children are next seen running down an empty street, followed closely by SUVs containing adults (ostensibly working with/for the shadowy organization) - one of the children (the leader of the escape seen in "Midnight City") calls a halt to the attempt to run as they seem to have come to a dead-end confrontation. The wheelchair-using child's eyes begin to glow red as she mentally takes control of the driver of one of the vehicles (whose eyes begin to glow red as well), causing him to step out of the SUV and confront the escapees. Via the driver, the wheelchair-using child telekinetically raises and then flings the SUV at the lead escapee (and thus at the entire group) - the leader's eyes glow blue-white as he stops the SUV mid-air and, as it hovers there, other psychic children assemble from elsewhere to add their abilities to those of the 4 escapees and overcome the wheelchair-using child to violently throw the vehicle back down the street.

This shocks the wheelchair-using child - she removes the leads from her temples and stands up from the wheelchair. Meanwhile, the assembled free psychic children, old and new, gather in what appears to be a vacant church. Circling up, they all engage their powers to light up: the video ends with a blue-white light rising above the Earth into space.

Across the trilogy of videos, M83 has referenced Akira, Village of the Damned and Close Encounters of the Third Kind as inspirations.

== Charts ==
| Chart (2012) | Peak position |
|---|---|
| Belgium (Ultratip Bubbling Under Wallonia) | 34 |
| US Rock Songs (Billboard) | 40 |
| US Alternative Songs (Billboard) | 24 |

== Release history ==
| Region | Date | Label | Format |
|---|---|---|---|
| United Kingdom | 5 February 2012 | Naïve Records | Digital Download |
