= Pitchfork Music Festival Paris 2011 =

Music festival

- Dates: 28–29 October 2011
- Locations: Grande halle de la Villette, Paris, France
- Website: pitchforkmusicfestival.fr

The Pitchfork Music Festival Paris 2011 was the first edition of the music festival. It was held on 28 to 29 October 2011 at the Grande halle de la Villette, Paris, France. The festival was headlined by Aphex Twin and Bon Iver, the second day lineup was also curated by the latter.

== Lineup ==
Headline performers are listed in boldface. Artists listed from latest to earliest set times.

Friday, 28 October	Saturday, 29 October
Erol Alkan (DJ set); Four Tet (DJ set); Cut Copy; Pantha du Prince; **Aphex Twin**; Mondkopf; Wild Beasts; Washed Out; Real Estate; Fucked Up; Team Ghost (Note: Punk rock band Iceage was supposed to perform at the festival but cancelled due to injury. The band was replaced by Team Ghost.)	**Bon Iver**; Lykke Li; Jens Lekman; Stornoway; Kathleen Edwards; The Rosebuds

The pre- and post-parties were held on 27 and 29 October 2011 at the Point Éphémère.

Pre-party (Thursday, 27 October)	Post-party (Saturday, 29 October)
Dirty Beaches; King Krule; Trailer Trash Tracys	Stay+ Purity Ring
