= Wait (M83 song) =

Single by M83

from the album Hurry Up, We're Dreaming
- Released: 5 December 2012
- Recorded: 2011
- Genre: Shoegaze
- Length: 5:43
- Label: Mute
- Songwriters: Anthony Gonzalez; Brad Laner; Justin Meldal-Johnsen; Morgan Kibby; Yann Gonzalez

M83 singles chronology
"Steve McQueen" (2012)	"Wait" (2012)	"Oblivion" (2013)

Music video
- "Wait" on YouTube

"Wait" is a song by French electronic music band M83. The track was released on 5 December 2012 as the fifth single from their sixth studio album, Hurry Up, We're Dreaming (2011).

== Music video ==
The music video was released on 5 December 2012 directed by Fleur & Manu and produced by Jules de Chateleux and Jean Davi. This video completed the trilogy started with "Midnight City" and continued in "Reunion".

"Wait" opens with a mirrored tetrahedron traveling through space. After some views of the expanse, the sleeping faces of two of the escaped children from "Midnight City" and "Reunion" are seen - apparently from within the pyramid.

On Earth, the now-ambulatory psychic child from "Reunion" is free and walking the desolate streets of an apocalyptic city - still in the clothes she wore in the previous videos. Amidst the destruction and bodies, various bleached-white animals appear, and the few humans seen are violent and agitated. As one human is attacked by two more, white wolves appear and gather around the child.

From space, an event can be seen and it causes the lead child to flinch in his sleep inside of the pyramid.

As the psychic child on Earth wraps a shawl over her shoulders, in space, the pyramid continues to travel, passing a nebula.

On Earth the psychic child is now fully wrapped in a black cloak, walking a deserted landscape. She uses her abilities to gather a single orb of water, positioning it directly over her third eye.

In space, the two escaped children seen in the pyramid are both awake as the pyramid appears to travel at high speeds through the cosmos (in a scene reminiscent of 2001: A Space Odyssey), apparently stressful enough to cause nosebleeds.

On Earth, the psychic child has found refuge in a rainforest-like environment, still accompanied by the wolves from earlier. She is now dressed in a more ceremonial outfit and seems to be aware of some event approaching.

In space, the tetrahedron approaches Earth - as it gets closer it separates into its component-panels, releasing the lead escapee who begins to fall through Earths' atmosphere.

As the psychic child on Earth raises her eyes, the lead escapee falls to Earth, landing in the rainforest. His fate is left unknown.

== In other media ==
The song was featured in the ninth episode of the television series The Secret Circle in 2011 and in Season 5 Episode 14 of Gossip Girl, "The Backup Dan". The song was also featured in the film Step Up Revolution and in Season 1 Episode 14 of Revenge in 2012.

"Wait" was featured for Turner Classic Movies year end tribute for 2012 "TCM Remembers" which memorialized all of the entertainment personnel that died during the year.

In 2013, the song was featured in the science-fiction drama TV series Under The Dome in Episode 7 of the first season.

Norwegian music producer Kygo made a free remix of the song which he released in 2014. Later, he released the remix officially as a new edit of it on his fifth album Kygo, released in June 2024.

The song was prominently featured in the 2014 film The Fault in Our Stars by Josh Boone, which he requested to be included as one of the songs for the film. Also in 2014, the song was featured at the end of the film Perfect Sisters and in The Vampire Diaries Season 6, Episode 5.

The song was used in the 2018 ballet, Hurry Up, We're Dreaming. Also, Season 1 Episode 1 of Netflix Series Ragnarok features this song in the very beginning during the opening.

The song was used in the 2019 PBS American Experience documentary Chasing the Moon, a film by Robert Stone, which features the human race to the moon for a new generation with conventional mythology and in the 2019 film Five Feet Apart.

The song was prominently used in the Season 3 finale of Star Trek: Strange New Worlds during Captain Christopher Pike's closing monologue.

== Charts ==
Chart (2015)	Peak position
France (SNEP)	154

== Certifications ==
Region	Certification	Certified units/sales
Italy (FIMI)	Gold	35,000^{‡}
New Zealand (RMNZ)	Platinum	30,000^{‡}
United Kingdom (BPI)	Silver	200,000^{‡}
^{‡} Sales+streaming figures based on certification alone.
