= Hurry Up, We're Dreaming (ballet) =

2018 ballet by Justin Peck and M83

- Choreographer: Justin Peck
- Music: Anthony Gonzalez; Yann Gonzalez; Brad Laner; Justin Meldal-Johnsen
- Premiere: April 10, 2018; War Memorial Opera House
- Original ballet company: San Francisco Ballet
- Design: Reid Bartelme; Harriet Jung
- Genre: contemporary ballet

Hurry Up, We're Dreaming is a ballet choreographed by Justin Peck to music from French electronic music band M83's album of the same name, which was written by Anthony Gonzalez, Yann Gonzalez, Brad Laner and Justin Meldal-Johnsen. The ballet was commissioned for the San Francisco Ballet's Unbound Festival and premiered on April 20, 2018, at the War Memorial Opera House.

== Production ==
=== Background ===
Justin Peck's Hurry Up, We're Dreaming was commissioned for San Francisco Ballet's Unbound Festival in 2018, in which 12 one-act ballets were created. When the ballet premiered, he was a New York City Ballet soloist, resident choreographer and interim leader, though he had previously made In the Countenance of Kings for the San Francisco Ballet, stated the troupe is his "favorite company to work with" outside of his home company.

=== Music ===
The ballet is set to Russian electronic music band M83's album Hurry Up, We're Dreaming, including the song "Wait." The music featured in the ballet was written by Anthony Gonzalez, Yann Gonzalez, Brad Laner and Justin Meldal-Johnsen. The album is about people dreaming at different stages of life. Peck listened to the album during his last time working with the San Francisco Ballet, and commented, "I chose this music because of my experience with it and how it inspired me in relation to these dancers in this company."

=== Choreography ===
As with other ballets at the Unbound Festival, Hurry Up, We're Dreaming was made over the course of three weeks in late 2017, and the creative teams returned three weeks before opening night.

The choreography of Hurry Up made references to the music's theme of people dreaming at different stages of life, as children, teenagers and adults. The ballet is performed by fourteen dancers, including three duets originated by Dores André, Wei Wang, Sarah Van Patten, Luke Ingham, Gabriela Gonzalez and Ulrik Birkkjaer. (Note: According to the program note, the role of Dores André's partner was created on Joseph Walsh, and according to Bachtrack, he was injured the 2018 season season. He had since performed the ballet.) Peck said he "had some in mind from the beginning," like Birkkjaer, who had toured in New York with the Royal Danish Ballet, and Gonzalez, who Peck met at the Miami City Ballet School.

Hurry Up is danced in sneakers. San Francisco Ballet artistic director Helgi Tomasson commented that the choreography of Hurry Up is "largely classical but the sneakers bring an entirely different look to them." He pointed out that choreographer Jerome Robbins had used sneakers in ballets decades ago but he was "very different" and Peck "has his feet firmly in today’s culture."

=== Costumes ===
The costumes are designed by Reid Bartelme and Harriet Jung, and are streetwear made of metallic fabrics.

== Critical reception ==
The ballet received positive reviews. On the premiere, Allan Ulrich of the San Francisco Chronicle called the ballet "a cleverly and congenially constructed romp that evokes a summer of love" but noted the duets "miss a distinctive tone." The New York Times's Alastair Macaulay called it "the most valuable creation of Unbound so far" but nevertheless noted the ballet is "imperfect." When summarizing the entire festival, Macaulay listed Hurry Up as one of two pieces at the festival he was "eager to revisit." On the company's tour appearance in London in 2019, Lyndsey Winship from The Guardian wrote that Hurry Up "is very balletic, but feels fresh, with a youthful authenticity."

Peck was nominated for the Prix Benois de la Danse for Hurry Up, We're Dreaming. The New York Times included the ballet its "Best Dance of 2018" list.
