= Midnight City (disambiguation) =

"Midnight City" is a 2011 song by M83.

Midnight City may also refer to:

- Midnight City, a video game company owned by Majesco
- "Midnight City" (Arrow), a season 3 episode of Arrow
