= Sarah Van Patten =

American ballet dancer

- Born: 1984 (age 40–41); Boston, Massachusetts, U.S.
- Occupation: ballet dancer
- Children: 1
- Career
- Current group: San Francisco Ballet
- Former groups: Royal Danish Ballet
- Website: sarahvanpatten.com

Sarah Van Patten (born 1984) is an American ballet dancer. She began an apprenticeship at the Royal Danish Ballet at age 15. In 2001, at age 17, she became the youngest ever dancer to receive a contract at the company. Later that year, she joined the San Francisco Ballet as a soloist, and was promoted to principal dancer in 2007. She retired from ballet in 2022.

== Early life ==
Van Patten was born in Boston. She started with ballet, tap and jazz, and later focused on ballet. Van Patten trained at Boston Ballet and began performing at age 8 in their annual performance of The Nutcracker. She later switched to Ballet Workshop of New England and performed at Massachusetts Youth Ballet under Jacqueline Cronsberg. Van Patten also learned some of George Balanchine's works, such as Serenade and Apollo under the direction of Cronsberg's daughter, Sandra Jennings, who danced at the New York City Ballet.

== Career ==
When Van Patten was 15, Jennings recommended her to audition for the Royal Danish Ballet in Copenhagen, which was co-directed by Jennings' former colleague, Colleen Neary. Van Patten was offered an apprenticeship and was one of the few foreign dancers in the company. Three months later, she was chosen by choreographer John Neumeier to dance the opening night cast in a revival of his Romeo and Juliet, with Mads Blangstrup, a principal, as her Romeo. She turned 16 shortly before she debuted the role. In 2001, at age 17, Van Patten became a member of the corps de ballet, thus became the youngest dancer to receive a contract in the company's history. Later that year, she joined the San Francisco Ballet as a soloist, after meeting Helgi Tomasson, the director of the company, when he was staging his version of The Sleeping Beauty in Copenhagen.

Van Patten became a principal dancer in 2007. Her repertoire include lead roles such as Odette/Odile in Swan Lake, the title role in Giselle, the title role in John Neumeier's The Little Mermaid and Tatiana in Onegin. She had also originated roles such as in Justin Peck's Hurry Up, We're Dreaming, Cathy Marston's Snowblind, Arthur Pita's Björk Ballet and Christopher Wheeldon's Within a Golden Hour, and danced the roles of Cinderella and of the Stepsister Edwina in the North American premiere of Wheeldon's Cinderella, which was a co-production with Dutch National Ballet. She performed at galas in Europe and Australia.

Van Patten retired at the end of the 2022 season.

== Selected repertoire ==
Van Patten's repertoire with San Francisco Ballet and other companies includes:

- After the Rain (pas de deux)
- Afternoon of a Faun
- Allegro Brillante
- Apollo (Terpsichore, Polyhymnia and Calliope)
- Ballo della Regina
- Le Carnival des Animaux (Elephant)
- Carousel (A Dance)
- Chroma
- Cinderella (Cinderella, Stepmother Hortensia, and Stepsister Edwina)
- The Concert
- Concerto Barocco
- Coppélia (Dawn and War and Discord soloist)
- Dances at a Gathering (Mauve)
- Divertimento No. 15
- Don Quixote (Mercedes, Queen of the Driads, Gypsy Queen, and Kitri's Friends)
- Drink to Me Only With Thine Eyes
- Elite Syncopations
- Fancy Free
- The Firebird (Firebird and Princess)
- The Four Temperaments (Sanguinic)
- Giselle (Giselle)
- Ibsen's House (Nora Helmer in "A Doll's House")
- In the Middle, Somewhat Elevated
- Jardin aux Lilas (Caroline)
- "Emeralds" and "Diamonds" from Jewels
- The Little Mermaid (Mermaid and Princess)
- The Nutcracker (Balanchine version) (Sugar Plum Fairy)
- The Nutcracker (Tomasson version) (Queen of the Snow, Sugar Plum Fairy, Arabian, and Grand Pas de Deux)
- The Nutcracker (Tomasson / Christensen version) (Sugar Plum Fairy, Snow Queen, Arabian, and Mirlitons)
- Onegin (Tatiana)
- Paquita
- Raymonda Act III
- Romeo and Juliet (Neumeier version) (Juliet)
- Romeo and Juliet (Tomasson version) (Juliet)
- Rush
- Sandpaper Ballet (pas de deux)
- The Sleeping Beauty (Lilac Fairy, Fairy of Generosity, and Pas de Six/Diamond Fairy)
- Serenade (Waltz Girl, Angel and Russian Girl)
- Chamber Symphony and Symphony #9 in Shostakovich Trilogy
- Suite en Blanc (Cigarette and pas de deux)
- Swan Lake (Odette/Odile, Swan Maidens, and Spanish)
- Sylvia
- Symphonic Variations
- Symphony in C
- Tchaikovsky Pas de Deux
- Theme and Variations
- Winter Dreams (Masha)

=== Created roles ===
- Bagatelles
- Béla
- Björk Ballet
- Courante
- Double Evil
- Double Stop
- From Foreign Lands
- Guide to Strange Places
- Hallelujah Junction
- Hurry Up, We're Dreaming
- Joyride
- Presentce
- Snowblind (Zeena Frome)
- The Fifth Season
- Trio
- Within the Golden Hour

== Awards and honors ==
Awards and honors:

- Chautauqua Festival Artistic Director's Award, 1997.
- Denmark's New Talent Prize, 2001.
- Nominated for an Isadora Duncan Dance Award for Individual Performance, 2009
- Isadora Duncan Dance Award for Best Ensemble Performance, 2009
- Isadora Duncan Dance Special Award for "Many Faces of Giselle", 2012

== Personal life ==
Van Patten, who did not attend high school, took her GED exam after she returned to the United States and earned her Bachelor's Degree at St Mary's College.

Van Patten is married and has two sons.
