= Outro (M83 song) =

2011 song by M83

Song by M83

from the album Hurry Up, We're Dreaming
- Released: 2011
- Length: 4:07
- Label: Naïve
- Songwriter: Anthony Gonzalez
- Producers: Anthony Gonzalez; Justin Meldal-Johnsen

"Outro" is a song by French electronic music artists M83, released as the final track on the group's sixth studio album, Hurry Up, We're Dreaming (2011).

The song has been frequently used in a number of media, including commercials, movies, trailers (notably Cloud Atlas and Kerbal Space Program 2), and television shows (including Top Gear, The Grand Tour, and Mr. Robot). In 2015, it charted for several weeks in France. By 2014, it had been so widely used that Christopher Rosen of the Huffington Post opined "Sorry, Everyone, It's Time To Retire M83's 'Outro'", in spite of it evoking "heartbreak, nostalgia, anticipation, jubilation and triumph".

== Certifications ==
Region	Certification	Certified units/sales
Italy (FIMI)	Gold	50,000^{‡}
United Kingdom (BPI)	Gold	400,000^{‡}
^{‡} Sales+streaming figures based on certification alone.
