= Into the Presence =

American alternative rock band

Into The Presence
- Origin: Los Angeles, California, United States
- Genres: Alternative rock; progressive rock
- Years active: 2008-2015
- Labels: Razor & Tie, Bieler Brothers
- Members: Luis Carlos Maldonado; Ana Lenchantin; Tim Alexander
- Website: intothepresence.com

Into The Presence was an American alternative rock band from Los Angeles, California, United States, founded in 2008. The band was fronted by Luis Carlos Maldonado (guitar/vocals) and featured Ana Lenchantin (cello/keyboards), Tim Alexander (drums), with Paz Lenchantin (bass, album only).

Maldonado had gained notoriety as guitarist/side musician with Glenn Hughes, Michael Schenker, UFO, John Waite, Pat Monahan And most recently Train, Bigelf, and Lisa Marie Presley also as a session musician for Shrapnel Records, as well as being a prolific songwriter.

Initially the band featured Tim Alexander, best known as the drummer for Primus and A Perfect Circle.

During the recording of the debut album Tim brought in cellist Ana Lenchantin, whose credits include Trent Reznor of Nine Inch Nails, Queens of the Stone Age, Gnarls Barkley, No Doubt, Rihanna, Kesha, Arthur Lee and Love, Eels and her sister, Paz Lenchantin who had been a member of A Perfect Circle and Zwan and is a current member of the Pixies.

The self-titled album was first released in 2009 after being signed by Michael Caplan on Razor & Tie and received favorable reviews from critics. Following the release they toured nationally, opening up for groups such as Vast and Puscifer, along with many other artists soon after which Alexander left the band.

With Luis and Ana remaining the core members, the band saw some personnel changes. They hired San Diego native Morgan Young (drums) and used several bassists while the band toured the US extensively.

The new line-up, with Young on drums and Devin Hoffman (bass) was complete in early 2011. The band had been working on new material, and were set to record the follow-up in late 2012. They had signed to Bieler Brothers, with a re-release of the debut album planned in 2012. For the new album, they had recorded many tracks at Sonic Ranch studios with Kyle Moorman engineering. The mixing of the album was completed by the late Stephen Stewart Short. Unfortunately more personnel changes along with Luis Maldonado, as well as Ana Lenchantin needing to tour with other artists, brought the group to a halt. The second album was completed but never found its way to a proper release.
