= Ana Lenchantin =

Argentine-American cellist

- Instrument: Cello

Ana Lenchantin is an Argentine-American cellist of French ancestry, known for frequent appearances with American rock bands such as Train, Into the Presence, The Eels, Nine Inch Nails, Queens of the Stone Age, Glenn Hughes, Jenny Lewis, Melissa Auf der Maur, Lenka, Gnarls Barkley, No Doubt, Arthur Lee and Love, A Perfect Circle, Thirty Seconds to Mars, Brian Wilson, Billy Corgan, Billy Howerdel, Damien Rice, Kerli, and many more.

She toured with Eels in their 2005 "Eels with Strings" tour and appears on Eels with Strings: Live at Town Hall. She has made numerous appearances on the late night television shows such as on Late Night with Conan O'Brien, The Tonight Show with Jay Leno, Late Show with David Letterman, Last Call with Carson Daly, The Late Late Show with Craig Ferguson and Later... with Jools Holland in England.

While on tour with Gnarls Barkley in 2006, Ana Lenchantin was contacted by Trent Reznor of Nine Inch Nails to perform and be musical director of the "unplugged" version of NIN at Neil Young's Bridge School Benefit. The instrumentation consisted of a violin, two cellos, bass, and a variety of Chinese instruments. Soon after the performance, Trent and strings were in the studio recording the 6 tracks. In 2009 she returned to perform at the Bridge School Benefit, this time putting a string group together with the band No Doubt.

In 2007, she performed in "From Malibu with Love II", a concert benefiting The Midnight Mission homeless shelter.

She is the sister of Paz Lenchantin, and Luciano Lenchantin who died in 2003. She collaborated with Paz's short-lived group Zwan and was slated to contribute to the acoustic incarnation of Zwan known as "The Djali Zwan".

Ana was the cellist for Indie/classical/rock band The Romanovs and core member of the Los Angeles-based band, Into the Presence. On September 21, 2009, she appeared in "Broken", the 2 hour season 6 premiere of House M.D., playing a non-communicative cellist confined to a mental institution alongside Gregory House.
