= Happily (film) =

- Official poster
- Directed by: BenDavid Grabinski
- Written by: BenDavid Grabinski
- Produced by: Spencer Berman; Jack Black; Chuckie Duff; Ross Kohn; Nancy Leopardi
- Starring: Joel McHale; Kerry Bishé; Natalie Zea; Paul Scheer; Al Madrigal; Natalie Morales; Jon Daly; Kirby Howell-Baptiste; Lo Mutuc (Note: Credited as Charlyne Yi); Breckin Meyer; Stephen Root
- Cinematography: Adam Bricker
- Edited by: Spencer Houck
- Music by: Joseph Trapanese
- Production companies: Electric Dynamite; Common Wall Media; Indy Entertainment
- Distributed by: Saban Films
- Release date: March 19, 2021
- Running time: 95 minutes
- Country: United States
- Language: English

Happily is a 2021 American comedy thriller film written and directed by BenDavid Grabinski, in his directorial debut. It stars Joel McHale, Kerry Bishé, Natalie Zea, Paul Scheer, Al Madrigal, Natalie Morales, Jon Daly, Kirby Howell-Baptiste, Lo Mutuc, Breckin Meyer, and Stephen Root.

It was released on March 19, 2021 by Saban Films.

== Premise ==
Tom and Janet's friends are jealous of their lustful relationship. When a visit from a mysterious stranger leads to a dead body, they begin to question the loyalty of their so-called friends.

== Cast ==
- Joel McHale as Tom
- Kerry Bishé as Janet
- Stephen Root as Goodman
- Natalie Zea as Karen
- Paul Scheer as Val
- Natalie Morales as Patricia
- Jon Daly as Donald
- Kirby Howell-Baptiste as Maude
- Lo Mutuc as Gretel
- Breckin Meyer as Richard
- Shannon Woodward as Carla
- Brea Grant as Cashier
- Al Madrigal as Arthur

== Production ==
In February, 2019 it was announced that Joel McHale, Kerry Bishé, Stephen Root, Natalie Zea, Paul Scheer, Natalie Morales, Jon Daly, Kirby Howell-Baptiste, Lo Mutuc, Breckin Meyer, Shannon Woodward, Brea Grant and Al Madrigal had been cast in the film, with BenDavid Grabinski directing from his screenplay. Nancy Leopardi, Ross Kohn, Jack Black and Spencer Berman would produce the film under their Indy Entertainment and Electric Dynamite companies, while Kyle Newman and Chuckie Duff would be executive producers under his Common Wealth Media banner.

Principal photography began in Los Angeles in February 2019.

== Release ==
It was scheduled to have its world premiere at the Tribeca Film Festival on April 18, 2020. However, the festival was postponed due to the COVID-19 pandemic. In November 2020, Saban Films acquired distribution rights to the film. It was released on March 19, 2021.

== Reception ==
Review aggregator Rotten Tomatoes gives the film a 70% approval rating based on 50 reviews, with an average rating of 6.60/10. The website's critics consensus reads: "Happily struggles to fully realize its ambitions, but at its best, this intermittently intriguing drama makes pointed -- and frequently funny -- observations about modern relationships." According to Metacritic, which sampled 11 critics and calculated a weighted average score of 56 out of 100, the film received "mixed or average" reviews.
