= Dores André =

Spanish ballet dancer

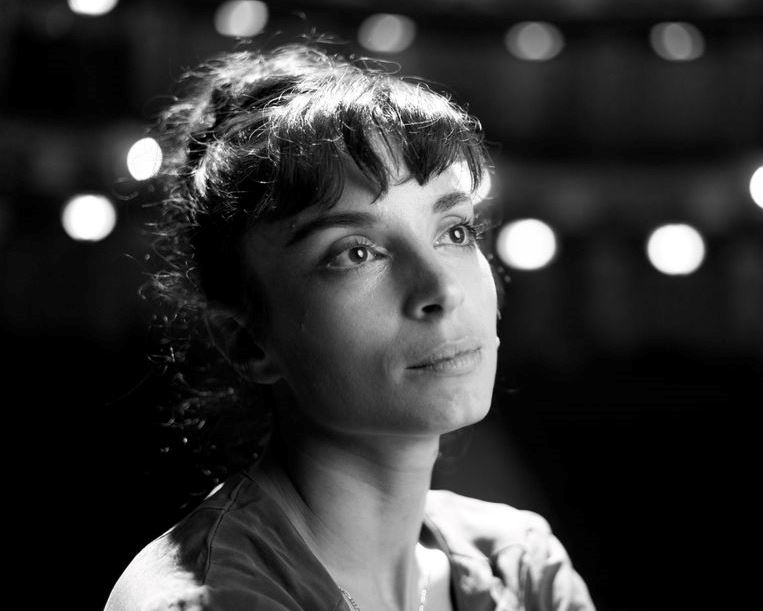
- Born: Dores André Rodríguez; 1985 (age 40–41); Vigo, Galicia, Spain
- Education: Estudio de Danza de Maria Avila
- Occupation: Ballet dancer
- Years active: 2004–present
- Career
- Current group: San Francisco Ballet

Dores André Rodríguez (born 1985) is a Spanish ballet dancer. She is currently a principal dancer at the San Francisco Ballet.

== Early life ==
André was born in Vigo, Spain, to a professor and a doctor. When she was eleven, she was sent to a small ballet studio at her hometown. Two years later, she was spotted by Maria de Avila at a competition, and joined her school in Zaragoza, which is eight hours away from Vigo. When she was seventeen, she was supposed to compete in the Prix de Lausanne, but had to withdraw after she broke her leg. She considered going to college instead but ultimately chose to pursue a career in ballet.

== Career ==
André briefly danced in a company in Florence, Italy. Then, she auditioned for the San Francisco Ballet, and joined the company as a member of the corps de ballet in 2004. She became a soloist in 2012 and a principal dancer in 2015. Roles she performed include the title role in Cinderella, Myrtha in Giselle, Juliet in Romeo and Juliet and Olga in Onegin. She had also originated roles, such as Christopher Wheeldon's Bound To and Justin Peck's Hurry Up, We're Dreaming. In 2018, she returned and performed in a gala in Zaragoza, where she had her training.

As a designer, André had designed costumes for Estonian National Ballet and Ballet Idaho. She is currently working on costumes for Royal New Zealand Ballet's The Sleeping Beauty.

== Selected repertoire ==
André's repertoire with the San Francisco Ballet includes:

- Agon (1st pas de trois)
- La Bayadère, Act II (Solo Shade in "The Kingdom of the Shades")
- Le Carnaval des Animaux (Hen)
- Cinderella (Cinderella, Stepsister Clementine, Spirit of Spring/Lightness, and Spanish Princess)
- The Concert
- Coppélia (Swanilda, Swanilda's Friends, and Jesterettes)
- Dances at a Gathering (Blue)
- Divertimento No. 15 (3rd solo and pas de trois)
- Drink to Me Only With Thine Eyes
- Don Quixote (Kitri, Mercedes, Kitri's Friends, and Gypsies)
- The Firebird (Princess)
- Frankenstein (Elizabeth Lavenza)
- Giselle (Myrtha, Solo Wili, and Peasant pas de cinq)
- In the Night (1st pas de deux)
- "Emeralds", "Rubies" and "Diamonds" from Jewels
- The Little Mermaid (Henriette/The Princess and Bridesmaids)
- The Nutcracker (Maid, Ballerina Doll, Queen of the Snow, Snowflakes, Spanish, French, Flowers, Sugar Plum Fairy, and Grand Pas de Deux)
- Onegin (Olga)
- Raymonda Act III (2nd solo and pas de trois)
- The Rite of Spring
- Romeo & Juliet (Juliet and Acrobats)
- Rush
- Sandpaper Ballet
- The Sleeping Beauty (Fairy of Serenity, White Cat, Little Lilacs, Nymphs, Pas de Six/Diamond Fairy, and The Enchanted Princess/Bluebird pas de deux)
- Serenade (Angel)
- Symphony #9 and Chamber Symphony in Shostakovich Trilogy
- Stars and Stripes (Finale)
- Suite en Blanc (Pas de cinq and Sieste)
- Swan Lake (Act I pas de trois, Aristocrats, Cygnets, Swan Maidens, Neapolitan, and Russian Princess)
- La Sylphide (Sylph)
- Symphony in C (2nd movement demi-soloist)
- Theme and Variations (demi-soloist)
- West Side Story Suite (Maria)
- Within the Golden Hour

=== Created roles ===
- Björk Ballet
- Bound To
- Die Toteninsel
- Fearful Symmetries
- Guernica
- In the Countenance of Kings (Quantus)
- Hurry Up, We're Dreaming
- Manifesto
- Pas/Parts 2016
- Thread

== Personal life ==
André is a feminist.

André grew up swimming and painting before she started ballet. In off-season, she swims five times a week with her sister, who is a competitive open-water swimmer, and paints as a hobby. She is also learning tap dancing. She lives in Twin Peaks, San Francisco.
