= The Romanovs =

Los Angeles based band

- From left to right: Dan Rosa, Wesley Precourt, Randy Cooke and Morgan Kibby.

Background information
- Origin: Los Angeles, California, United States
- Genres: Indie; classical; alternative; dark cabaret
- Years active: 2003–2007 (hiatus)
- Label: Obscura Records
- Members: Morgan Kibby; Ana Lenchantin; Randy Cooke; Dan Rosa; Wesley Precourt
- Past members: Paul Wiancko

The Romanovs are a band from Los Angeles. The band consists of Morgan Kibby (lead vocalist and writer), Ana Lenchantin (cello), Dan Rosa (piano), Wesley Precourt (violin) and Randy Cooke (percussion).

The Romanovs are best known for their high-energy and lustrous live stage performances. The band is often doused in old Victorian spirit and are usually dressed in a classical manner while gracing the stages throughout Los Angeles.

== History ==
In 2003, Morgan released an EP entitled Beggar's Alchemy. She had worked on this album mainly as a solo artist providing the vocals, cello and piano on her own. Soon after the release Morgan started performing with a range of musicians which eventually formed the initial line-up of the band. Dan Rosa and Paul Wiancko performed with Morgan on a majority of their live shows including the release party for Beggar's Alchemy.

In 2005, the band released the LP …and the moon was hungry…. Featured on their first LP were 7 previous songs from Beggar's Alchemy with the addition of two new studio recordings (‘Kiss is in the Chemicals’ and ‘China Shop’) and two live recordings (‘I Shot the Monster’ and ‘Sonnet’). Paul provided the cello for the new studio tracks and Wesley Precourt and Elizabeth Hooper provided the violin. Dan and Randy Cooke played drums and piano for the two live tracks. For a short time the group were just known as ‘Morgan’ and soon after evolved into ‘Morgan and the Hidden Hands’. After the release of their LP many live performances started to commence. The band was seen at venues such as the Lava Lounge, The Dragonfly, The Troubador, The Empire Ballroom, The Key Club and The Mint with the addition of Wes on violin and Randy on the drums.

During this time, some members of the band were performing with other artists or working on other projects. Morgan recorded a personalised version of Simon and Garfunkel's ‘Scarborough Fair’ which was placed on a cover CD. She laid down vocals on movie trailers such as ‘Lady in the Water’, ‘Harry Potter and the Goblet of Fire (film)’ and ‘Pride and Prejudice’. She also sang on a new track for American Idol contestant Clay Aiken. Wes played with Justin Timberlake at the Grammy's and was soloing with national orchestras. In late 2006 Paul provided the cello for three new Veruca Salt tracks (‘Wake Up Dead’, ‘The Sun’ and ‘Salt Flat Epic’ on their new album titled ‘IV’.

In 2007, the band started to re-mix and re-master their former LP …and the moon was hungry…. New percussion, cello, violin, piano and vocals were added to former tracks as well as two new studio recordings titled "Fever Pitch" and "Mr. Okada". This was the first release with the band operating under their new decided name: The Romanovs. Shortly before the new release of …and the moon was hungry… Paul Wiancko was no longer the cellist for the band and Ana Lenchantin became their new cello player.

Morgan has recently worked on and completed the score for Daniel Stamm’s documentary "A Necessary Death". Due to recent success with touring and collaborating with electronic group M83, The Romanovs are on an extended hiatus until further notice.

== Awards ==
The Romanovs won a Toronto Independent Music award for Best USA Band on October 4, 2007.

== Discography ==
=== Albums ===
- …And the Moon Was Hungry…(Re-mastered) (2007)

=== EPs and LPs ===
- …And the Moon Was Hungry… (2004–05)
- Beggar's Alchemy (2003)
