= Mike & Nick & Nick & Alice =

2026 American film by BenDavid Grabinski

- Promotional release poster
- Directed by: BenDavid Grabinski
- Written by: BenDavid Grabinski
- Produced by: Andrew Lazar
- Starring: Vince Vaughn; James Marsden; Eiza González; Keith David; Jimmy Tatro
- Cinematography: Larry Fong
- Edited by: Tim Squyres
- Music by: Joseph Trapanese
- Production companies: 20th Century Studios; Mad Chance Productions
- Distributed by: Hulu
- Release dates: March 14, 2026 (SXSW); March 27, 2026 (Worldwide)
- Running time: 107 minutes
- Country: United States
- Language: English

Mike & Nick & Nick & Alice is a 2026 American action comedy crime film written and directed by BenDavid Grabinski, produced by Andrew Lazar, and starring Vince Vaughn, James Marsden, Eiza González, Keith David, and Jimmy Tatro. It premiered at the South by Southwest Film & TV Festival on March 14, 2026, before releasing worldwide on Disney+ and Hulu on March 27.

== Plot ==
After his adopted son Jimmy Boy is released from prison, mob boss Sosa and his men celebrate with a night of partying. Among them is Nick, a loan shark whose wife Alice is having an affair with his fellow criminal Quick Draw Mike. No longer willing to kill, Mike plans to leave Sosa's organization, but agrees to help Nick with a job. Following Nick’s instructions, Mike attempts to chloroform a man he discovers is Nick himself, and learns that the Nick who enlisted his help is from the future, while the present-day Nick escapes.

Mike realizes he has been framed as the informant who betrayed Jimmy, and is now the target of "The Barron", a cannibalistic assassin hired by Sosa. Future Nick explains that six months from that night, he tried to collect a debt from Symon, an inventor and friend of Alice who borrowed money to build a time machine. Triggering the machine, Nick was sent back in time to the night Mike would be killed, inadvertently shooting Symon dead and destroying the machine. While Sosa, Jimmy, and their men enjoy a string of parties, Future Nick and Mike recapture Present Nick at a convenience store, bringing him and Alice to Nick's secret apartment.

Both Present and Future Nick are aware of Mike and Alice's relationship, and acknowledge the unhappy state of their own marriage in an argument about Gilmore Girls. Revealing that Alice is pregnant with Mike's child, Future Nick is determined to save Mike. Lying to Sosa that he has captured Mike, Future Nick lures the Barron to the apartment to ambush him. Present Nick selfishly tries to expose the plan, but is struck with guilt when the Barron kills Mike, though this is only a ruse: the “assassin” is actually Chet, a special effects artist Future Nick recruited to dissuade Present Nick from seeking revenge on Mike.

The real Barron arrives and is shot dead by Future Nick, while Alice kills his henchmen with their own grenade. Future Nick tells Sosa that Mike has killed the hitmen and gone on the run, but Sosa vows to sends his entire organization after him. Unable to prove the true identity of the informant, a beloved but now dead gangster, Mike and the others prepare to eliminate Sosa and all his men at Jimmy's final party.

Sending corrupt police officer Sam to plant weapons throughout the party, Present and Future Nick and a reluctant Mike massacre Sosa's men. Held at gunpoint by Sosa, Alice manages to kill him, but Present Nick is shot in the neck by a dying Jimmy. The others race to save him, singing along with Oasis's "Don't Look Back in Anger" to keep him awake, but Present Nick dies before reaching the hospital and Future Nick ceases to exist due to the time paradox. Alice reveals that Symon built another time machine, which Mike activates to embark on a second chance for Nick.

== Cast ==
- Vince Vaughn as Future Nick / Present Nick
- James Marsden as Quick Draw Mike
- Eiza González as Alice
- Keith David as Sosa
- Jimmy Tatro as Jimmy Boy
- Emily Hampshire as Sam, a crooked cop
- Arturo Castro as Dumbass Tony
- Lewis Tan as Roid Rage Ryan
- Ben Schwartz as Symon
- Stephen Root as Chet
- Dolph Lundgren as "The Barron"
- Dylan Playfair as Stoned Cashier
- Ella Ballentine as Marceline
- Ellen Wong as Trudy

== Production ==
=== Development and writing ===
In April 2023, 20th Century Studios acquired a spec script titled Mike & Nick & Nick & Alice with writer BenDavid Grabinski also set to direct and Andrew Lazar producing; the spec was described as a buddy action comedy set in the criminal underground.

=== Casting ===
Vince Vaughn was announced to have been in talks to star in the film on May 17, 2024. In June 2024, James Marsden joined the film, with Vaughn officially cast in the leading role. In July 2024, Eiza González was in talks to join. González had been confirmed by August, when Jimmy Tatro and Keith David had joined the cast as well. Casting additions reported in September included Emily Hampshire, Arturo Castro, and Lewis Tan. Ben Schwartz was added in October.

=== Filming ===
Principal photography was set to begin on September 3, 2024, in Winnipeg, Manitoba, but began two days later, with Larry Fong as cinematographer. González finished filming her scenes by October 11 of that year, and filming concluded by November 3, 2024.

=== Post-production ===
Tim Squyres edited the film.

== Music ==
Joseph Trapanese composed the score for the film.

== Release ==
=== Streaming ===
Mike & Nick & Nick & Alice premiered at South by Southwest on March 14, 2026, followed by a release on Hulu in the United States and Disney+ internationally on March 27.

== Reception ==
=== Critical response ===
On the review aggregator website Rotten Tomatoes, 75% of 106 critics' reviews are positive, with an average rating of 6.3/10. The website's consensus reads: "A daffy crime comedy that uses its sci-fi elements in the service of character, Mike & Nick & Nick & Alice is slick and amusing proof that there's enough room for two Vince Vaughns." Metacritic, which uses a weighted average, assigned the film a score of 70 out of 100, based on 19 critics, indicating "generally favorable" reviews.

Brian Tallerico of RogerEbert.com gave the film three out of four stars and wrote that it's "remarkably fun". Glenn Garner of Deadline wrote, "Fans of the actor might enjoy the movie's double dose of Vaughn, but it's the supporting cast of Mike & Nick & Nick & Alice that makes it great (it might have been a tad complicated to squeeze all their names in that title)."
