= BenDavid Grabinski =

American filmmaker

- Born: BenDavid Thomas Grabinski; February 12, 1983 (age 43); Lincoln, Nebraska
- Education: Iowa State University
- Occupations: film director; screenwriter; producer; showrunner
- Years active: 2005–present
- Agent: WME

BenDavid Thomas Grabinski (born February 12, 1983) is an American film director, screenwriter, and producer and television showrunner. His directorial debut was the 2021 comedy thriller film Happily starring Joel McHale and Kerry Bishé. He wrote and directed the 2026 buddy comedy film Mike & Nick & Nick & Alice starring Vince Vaughn, James Marsden, and Eiza González which headlined the 2026 South by Southwest Film & TV Festival on March 14, 2026, and is distributed by Hulu.

== Early life ==
Grabinski was born on February 12, 1983, in Lincoln, Nebraska. Growing up, his only interest was in becoming a film director. He graduated from Grinnell High School in Grinnell, Iowa and studied journalism at Iowa State University.

== Career ==
He moved to Los Angeles in 2005; that same year he optioned his first script. His script The How-To Guide for Saving the World appeared on the 2008 Black List, a list of highly regarded but unproduced screenplays as voted on by industry members, and optioned to MGM with Barry Sonnenfeld directing.

In 2011, Grabinski wrote and directed a short film titled Cost of Living starring Brandon Routh. Routh was cast as a result of losing a bet.

He worked for Warner Bros. on the script for the Adventure Time movie and his spec script Bravado sold to Paramount in 2016. He is a member of both the Writers Guild of America West and the Directors Guild of America and is represented by WME.

== Filmography ==
Short film

Year	Title	Director	Writer
2011	Cost of Living	Yes	Yes

Feature film

Year	Title	Director	Writer	Producer
2016	Skiptrace	No	Yes	No
2021	Happily	Yes	Yes	Yes
2026	Mike & Nick & Nick & Alice	Yes	Yes	No
TBA	Hex	No	Yes	Executive

Additional literary material

- Coyote vs. Acme (2026)

Television

Year	Title	Director	Writer	Executive Producer	Creator	Developer	Notes
2014	Enormous	Yes	No	No	No	No	
2019	Are You Afraid of the Dark?	No	Yes	Yes	Yes	Yes	Wrote 13 episodes
2023	Scott Pilgrim Takes Off	No	Yes	Yes	Yes	Yes	
