= Team Ghost =

French electronic music group

- Origin: Paris, France
- Genres: Electronic; shoegazing
- Years active: 2009–present
- Labels: Sonic Cathedral; wSphere
- Spinoff of: M83
- Members: Nicolas Fromageau Christophe Guerrin Benoit de Villeneuve Pierre Blanc Felix Delacroix
- Website: www.teamghostmusic.com

Team Ghost is a French electronic music group created by Nicolas Fromageau, co-founder of M83, which he left in 2004.

== History ==
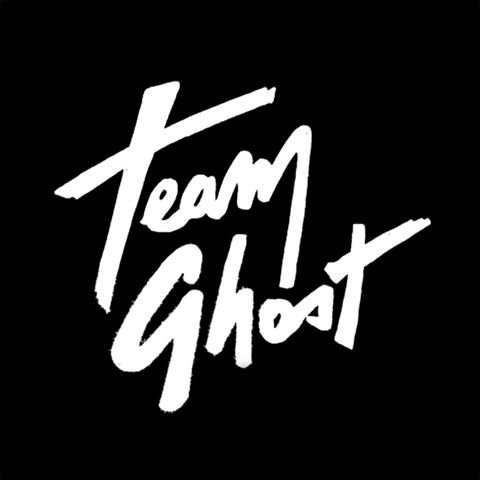
Logo

In Paris with the help of Jean-Philippe Talaga (who is the band A&R today) and bandmate Christophe Guérin, Nicolas Fromageau founded Team Ghost in 2007. the band released their first EP in April 2010 First act to be coined as “cold gaze” by the NME (for their mixture of Cold Wave and Shoegaze), Team Ghost released the EP "You Never Did Anything Wrong to Me", in 2010 through the English label Sonic Cathedral. In the fall of that year, they followed it with the EP "Celebrate What You Can't See" produced by Villeneuve. This collaboration resulted in Benoît de Villeneuve joining the band as composer, together with bassist Pierre Blanc and drummer Félix Delacroix.

After a series of concerts given in Paris, the group was the opening act of the European tour for the Canadians Crystal Castles. Team Ghost also played at several festivals in the United Kingdom during the summer of 2010 such as the Offset Festival of London and the festival Rockness in Scotland. The two first EPs were released as "We Will Shine" in Japan at the fall of 2011

Team Ghost released their first album Rituals in March 2013 and the first single is called "Dead Film Star". They went on tour in April 2013 in Europe and in New York on June.

On December 2, 2016 they released their third, self titled and self released album, preceded by the single "The Riser".

== Band members ==
- Nicolas Fromageau: vocals, guitar
- Christophe Guérin: vocals, guitar
- Benoit de Villeneuve : vocals, guitar, keyboard
- Félix Delacroix: drums
- Pierre Blanc: bass

== Discography ==
=== Albums ===
- 2011: We All Shine (Sonic Cathedral)
- 2013: Rituals (wSphere)
- 2016: Team Ghost (self released, distributed by Grand Musique)

=== Singles ===
- 2016: The Riser (self released, distributed by Grand Musique) [Listen].

=== EP ===
- 2010 : You Never Did Anything Wrong To Me (Sonic Cathedral)
- 2010 : Celebrate What You Can't See (Sonic Cathedral)
- 2012 : Dead Film Star (wSphere / Wagram)
- 2013 : Curtains (wSphere)
- 2013 : Terre Brûlée (wSphere) (Record Store Day)

=== Remixes ===
- 2010 : Yeti lane - Twice
- 2010 : Wild Palms - To The Lighthouse
- 2011 : M83 - Midnight City
- 2011 : Anoraak feat. Siobhan Wilson – Dolphins & Highways
- 2012 : Fairewell - Wild Meadow / I've Been Locked Away
- 2012 : Collateral - CTRL 5
- 2012 : Villeneuve – The Sun
- 2012 : Unkle – Natural Selection
- 2012 : Mandrac – Magnet
- 2013 : Benjamin Biolay - Profite (feat. Vanessa Paradis)
- 2013 : Owlle – Ticky Ticky
