= Oblivion (2013 film) =

2013 film by Joseph Kosinski

- Theatrical release poster
- Directed by: Joseph Kosinski
- Screenplay by: Karl Gajdusek; Michael deBruyn
- Based on: Oblivion by Joseph Kosinski
- Produced by: Peter Chernin; Dylan Clark; Duncan Henderson; Joseph Kosinski; Barry Levine
- Starring: Tom Cruise; Morgan Freeman; Olga Kurylenko; Andrea Riseborough; Nikolaj Coster-Waldau; Melissa Leo
- Cinematography: Claudio Miranda
- Edited by: Richard Francis-Bruce
- Music by: M83 (original music); Anthony Gonzalez (music composed); Joseph Trapanese (music composed)
- Production companies: Universal Pictures; Relativity Media; Chernin Entertainment; Monolith Pictures; Radical Studios
- Distributed by: Universal Pictures
- Release dates: March 26, 2013 (Buenos Aires); April 19, 2013 (United States)
- Running time: 124 minutes
- Country: United States
- Language: English
- Budget: $120 million
- Box office: $287.9 million

Oblivion is a 2013 American epic post-apocalyptic science fiction action film produced and directed by Joseph Kosinski from a screenplay by Karl Gajdusek and Michael deBruyn, starring Tom Cruise in the main role alongside Morgan Freeman, Olga Kurylenko, Andrea Riseborough, Nikolaj Coster-Waldau, and Melissa Leo in supporting roles. Based on Kosinski's unpublished Radical Comics graphic novel of the same name, the film pays homage to 1970s sci-fi, and is a "love story" set in 2077 on a post-apocalyptic Earth desolated by an alien war. A maintenance technician (Cruise) on the verge of completing his mission recovers a woman (Kurylenko) who survived a space pod crash, leading him to question his purpose and discover the truth about the war.

Oblivion premiered in Buenos Aires on March 26, 2013, and was released in theaters by Universal Pictures on April 19. The film grossed $286 million worldwide on a production budget of $120 million and received mixed reviews from critics.

== Plot ==
In 2017, aliens known as Scavengers (mostly "Scavs" in dialogue) attack Earth and destroy the Moon, triggering global natural disasters. Although humanity wins the war using nuclear weapons, Earth is left uninhabitable.

Sixty years later, the remnants of humanity have relocated to a colony on Saturn's largest moon, Titan, except for Unit 49—technician Jack and his communications officer Victoria ("Vika")—who are scheduled to join them in two weeks. The pair oversee hydro rigs that convert seawater into fusion energy for the Tet, the last remaining human colony ship in orbit. Though Jack and Victoria are romantically involved and have had their memories erased for security reasons, Jack experiences recurring dreams of an unknown woman. He also secretly visits a hidden, verdant valley where he has built a lakeside cabin and collects relics of Earth's past.

While investigating a missing combat drone—autonomous, highly advanced, and heavily armed—Jack is nearly captured by Scavengers. Later, he discovers the Scavengers are transmitting a signal into space. A module of a NASA spaceship crash-lands at the signal's coordinates, carrying five humans in suspended animation ("delta sleep"), including the woman from Jack's dreams. Drones arrive and terminate four of them, but Jack protects the unconscious woman and brings her pod back to Unit 49's base.

After reviving her, Jack and Victoria learn that the woman, Julia, was aboard the Odyssey spaceship and has been in stasis since 2017. Julia insists on recovering the ship's flight recorder. She and Jack are captured by Scavengers and brought to the Raven Rock Mountain Complex. Their leader, Malcolm, reveals that the Scavengers are surviving humans. Malcolm needs Jack to reprogram a captured drone to deliver a nuclear bomb, built from the Odyssey's reactor, to the Tet. Jack refuses, so Malcolm releases him and Julia, urging him to seek the truth in the radiation zone, which is off-limits.

Julia helps Jack recall that she is his wife, and fragments of his memories begin to return. When they arrive back at Unit 49, a devastated Victoria informs Sally, the Tet's mission controller, that she and Jack are no longer an "effective team". A drone activates and kills Victoria. Jack and Julia destroy the drone but crash their aircraft inside the radiation zone. There, they encounter another version of Jack ("Jack-52") who arrives to repair the drone. Jack subdues him, but Julia is seriously injured in the fight. Jack impersonates his clone to infiltrate Unit 52, meets "Victoria-52", and steals medical equipment for Julia. They rest at his cabin.

At Raven Rock, Malcolm reveals the truth: humanity lost the war, and the Tet is an extraterrestrial intelligence harvesting Earth's resources. After the Moon's destruction, the Tet deployed thousands of clones of astronaut Jack Harper—brainwashed into obedience—to exterminate the remaining humans. Malcolm had assumed that these clones were inhuman until witnessing Jack show interest in a discarded book of ancient poems, hinting at lingering humanity. Jack reprograms the captured drone, but it is destroyed in a surprise attack by other drones, leaving Malcolm badly wounded. Jack and Julia resolve to deliver the bomb; Julia enters a stasis pod.

En route, Jack listens to the Odyssey's flight recorder, which reveals the original Jack Harper and Victoria were astronauts sent to explore Titan before being confronted by the Tet. The pair were captured but not before Jack ejected the remaining crew—including Julia—in stasis pods to protect them. Jack gains access to the Tet by claiming he is delivering Julia, as previously instructed; instead, the stasis pod contains a dying Malcolm. They detonate the bomb, destroying the Tet and themselves. Julia later awakens at the cabin.

Three years later, Julia lives there and it is revealed she had a daughter with Jack. A group of Raven Rock survivors arrives with Jack-52, who has begun regaining fragments of his identity.

== Cast ==
- Tom Cruise as Jack Harper—Tech 49, a technician who works to repair drones on Earth and questions his mission. Originally, he was the American commander of a mission en route to Titan who was captured by the Tet and cloned to fight humanity. Cruise also plays Jack Harper—Tech 52, a clone who seeks out Julia after the destruction of the Tet.
- Morgan Freeman as Malcolm Beech, an American veteran soldier and leader of a large community of scavengers, the human survivors of the alien Tet's attacks.
- Olga Kurylenko as Julia Rusakova Harper, Jack's wife and a Russian crew member on the Odyssey, who was sent back towards Earth by her husband to protect her from the initial contact with the Tet.
- Andrea Riseborough as Victoria "Vika" Olsen, Jack's communications partner and housemate. Originally, she was the British co-pilot of Jack's mission to Titan who was captured and cloned to assist in the Tet's war on humanity. Riseborough also plays a clone of Vika whom Jack misleads to obtain medical supplies.
- Nikolaj Coster-Waldau as Sergeant Sykes, the main military commander of Beech's community of scavengers who is skeptical of Jack at first.
- Melissa Leo as the Tet, an alien artificial intelligence seeking to acquire Earth's natural resources and wipe out humanity. Leo also plays Sally, the mission director of Jack and Julia's mission to Titan; her likeness was copied by the Tet to serve as its visual and auditory representation.
- Zoë Bell as Kara, a soldier and member of the scavengers.

== Production ==
=== Development ===
Joseph Kosinski started the movie process by beginning work on a graphic novel called Oblivion featuring his story. While the completion of this would be teased to the public and the concept was used to pitch the movie, it was never finished and Kosinski claims he never intended to, stating it was "just a stage in the project [of film development]". Arvid Nelson was billed as co-writer and Radical Comics was attached as publisher. The novel was never finished; Kosinski explaining: "the partnership with Radical Comics allowed me to continue working on the story by developing a series of images and continuing to refine the story more over a period of years. Then I basically used all that development as a pitch kit to the studio. So even though we really never released it as an illustrated novel the story is being told as a film, which was always the intention."

Walt Disney Pictures, which produced Kosinski's previous film Tron: Legacy (2010), acquired the Oblivion film adaptation rights from Radical Comics and Kosinski after a heated auction in August 2010. The film was a directing vehicle for Kosinski, with Barry Levine producing, and Jesse Berger executive producing. Other studios that made bids on the film were Paramount Pictures, 20th Century Fox, and Universal Pictures. Disney subsequently released the rights after realizing the PG-rated film they envisioned, in line with their family-oriented reputation, would require too many story changes. Universal, which had also bid for the original rights, then bought them from Kosinski and Radical and authorized a PG-13 film version.

The film's script was originally written by Kosinski and William Monahan and underwent a first rewrite by Karl Gajdusek. When the film passed into Universal's hands, a final rewrite was done by Michael Arndt, under the pen name "Michael deBruyn". Universal was particularly appreciative of the script, saying, "It's one of the most beautiful scripts we've ever come across."

The Bubble Ship seen in the film (above) was inspired by the Bell 47 helicopter (below).

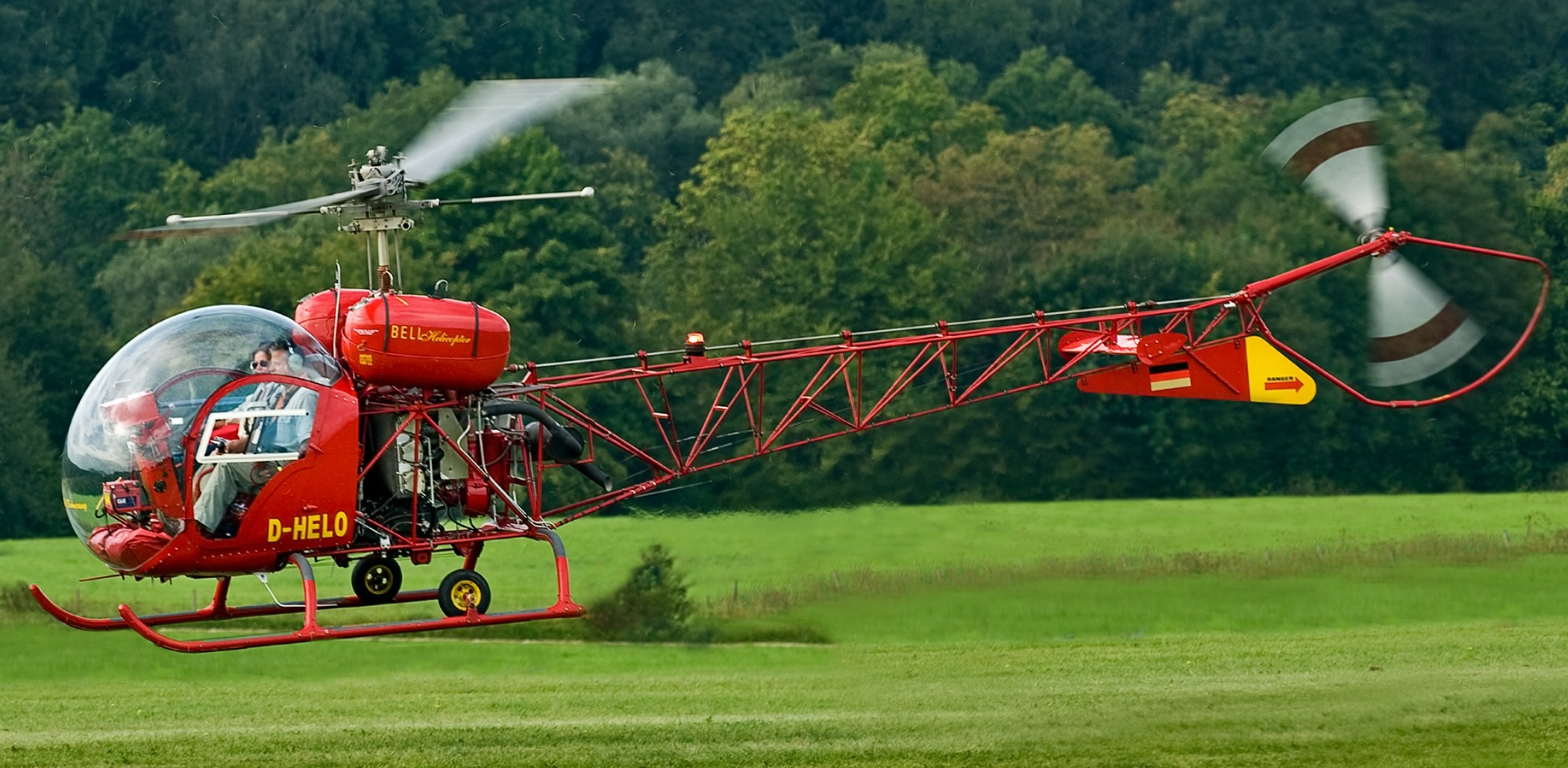

The Bubble Ship operated by Cruise's main character, Jack 49, was inspired by the Bell 47 helicopter (often colloquially referred to as a "bubble cockpit" helicopter), a utilitarian 1947 vehicle with a transparent round canopy that Kosinski saw in the lobby of the Museum of Modern Art in Manhattan, and which he likened to a dragonfly. Daniel Simon, who previously worked with Kosinski as the lead vehicle designer on Tron: Legacy, was tasked with creating the Bubble Ship from this basis, incorporating elements evocative of an advanced fighter jet with the Bell 47 to create a light, functional vehicle that was both practical and aesthetically pleasing, much as he observed with the ships in Stanley Kubrick's 2001: A Space Odyssey (1968).

"When Kubrick made 2001, rather than going to the hotshot concept designers of the day, he hired NASA engineers", said Simon. "I believe in form follows function. I'm not a fan of excessive decoration, of putting fins on something because it looks cool". Rather than employ digital models, Wild Factory, a Camarillo concept car company, built the Bubble Ship as a 25-foot-long (7.6 m), 4,000–5,000 lb (1,800–2,300 kg), mostly aluminum prop. Elements of the cockpit, such as the placement of the joystick and pedals, were customized for Cruise, who is a qualified pilot, and who had some input into the design. The craft was also made to be easy to disassemble and assemble, to facilitate transport to Iceland shooting locations, where it would be mounted on a gimbal for shots of it flying. The unmanned aerial drones that were featured prominently in the plot were created to appear to be in the same design family as the Bubble Ship.

=== Casting ===
Tom Cruise had expressed interest in the film for a long time, and officially signed to play the lead role on May 20, 2011.

For casting the lead role of Julia opposite Cruise, the producers considered five actresses: Jessica Chastain, Olivia Wilde, Brit Marling, Noomi Rapace and Olga Kurylenko, and all five auditioned on August 27, 2011. On September 26, 2011, it was announced that Chastain had been cast. Chastain was subsequently offered the lead role in the Kathryn Bigelow film Zero Dark Thirty (2012) and Cruise let her be released from her contract for Oblivion to make the other film, for which Chastain has publicly thanked Cruise. The role was later recast with Kurylenko.

In preparation for the role, Kurylenko watched astronaut training videos as well as classic science fiction and romance films, such as Solaris (1972), Notorious (1946), and Casablanca (1942). "What's funny is I actually watched Solaris; Joseph never brought it up", said Kurylenko. "I come from Tarkovsky-land, and at that point I hadn't watched it for many years. I watched the new one as well, with George Clooney and Natascha McElhone. The story – both in Solaris and Oblivion – deals with space and memory."

For the other leading role, Victoria, the producers initially considered Hayley Atwell, Diane Kruger and Kate Beckinsale. The three actresses traveled to Pittsburgh to screen-test with Cruise, who was filming Jack Reacher (2012). The role finally went to Andrea Riseborough. Melissa Leo was cast at a later date as Sally.

=== Filming ===
Production began on March 12, 2012, and concluded on July 14, 2012. Filming locations included Baton Rouge and New Orleans, Louisiana. Out of approximately three months of shooting, 69 days were shot in Louisiana, from March through May 2012. 11 days were shot in New York in June 2012, where a key flashback was shot on the Empire State Building observation deck; CGI was used to portray a future skyline with a completed new World Trade Center complex. A few days were spent in Mammoth in California in June 2012. Most importantly, 10 days were filmed in Iceland in June 2012, when the daylight lasts for nearly 24 hours a day. As well as showcasing Iceland's volcanic landscapes, the film's director Joseph Kosinski sought to take advantage of the round-the-clock light, in particular the 6pm to 1am waning light known as "magic hour", to "bring sci-fi out into the daylight", in contrast with films such as Alien, which spent their time in dark hulls or benighted planets.

The single most difficult scene to film was when Harper takes a break to admire the view and waters a flower. It was filmed by having Cruise sit next to an 800-foot (240-meter) drop at the top of Iceland's Jarlhettur on the root of Langjökull, which is accessible only by helicopter. The scenes set at Harper's idyllic forest retreat were filmed at Black's Pond in June Lake, California.

Oblivion was filmed with Sony's CineAlta F65 camera, which was shipped in January 2012. A Red Epic was also used for scenes that required going handheld or when body mount rigging was applied. The film was shot in 4K resolution in Sony's proprietary raw image format, but for cost reasons (and over Kosinski's protests), both the digital intermediate and final version were done at 2K resolution.

For the Sky Tower set (built on a soundstage in Baton Rouge), Kosinski and cinematographer Claudio Miranda collaborated with visual effects and animation company Digital Domain to establish both environment and lighting by the use of 21 front-screen projectors aimed at a huge wraparound backdrop to form one continuous image, rather than bluescreen backdrops. The backdrop consisted of a single seamless piece of painted white muslin, 500 by 42 feet (152 by 13 meters), which was wrapped around the set for 270-degree coverage. This enabled the full environment to be captured in camera, and assisted in lighting up to 90 percent of the set.

Had blue screen been used on the "glass house" Sky Tower, the glass would have vanished into the blue lighting, and would have had to be reproduced digitally in post-production. The actors enjoyed working in the environment, as they could look outside and actually see the sunrise or sunset imagery. This new technique allowed them to cut down on both the effects shots, which ended up at around 800 in total, and the expenses. Even the "control table" which Victoria operates was filmed then displayed on a large screen.

To obtain the necessary footage to create the illusion that the Sky Tower set was sitting high above the clouds, Digital Domain sent a crew to film the view from the peak of Haleakalā in Hawaii for four days with three Red Epic cameras mounted side by side on a single rig. Digital Domain's Playa Vista office stitched together the data from the three cameras to form a single gigantic video stream (with each still image consisting of 26 megapixels) and produced a variety of different time-of-day clips to be projected on the set.

=== Music ===
On June 28, 2012, it was announced that French electronic act M83, consisting solely of Anthony Gonzalez at the time, would compose the soundtrack for Oblivion. On why he chose M83 to score the film, director Joseph Kosinski said, "I went back and I found my first treatment for Oblivion from 2005 and it had listed in the treatment a soundtrack of M83. Obviously, the Tron: Legacy collaboration with Daft Punk worked out as good as I would have ever hoped, [so] I wanted to do something similar in that I'm pulling an artist from outside the movie business to create an original sound for this film." Kosinski continued, "Daft Punk's music wouldn't make sense for this movie. It had to be an artist whose music fit the themes and story I was trying to tell. And M83's music I felt was fresh and original, and big and epic, but at the same time emotional and this is a very emotional film and it felt like a good fit."

To guide Gonzalez through the scoring process, Kosinski brought in Joseph Trapanese, to co-write the score alongside Gonzalez. Kosinski stated, "Together they have created the score that I have dreamed about since I first put this story down on paper eight years ago." Trapanese first came to Kosinski's attention when he collaborated with Daft Punk on Tron: Legacy as arranger and orchestrator.

In an interview with Rolling Stone, Gonzalez said, "I started to write the soundtrack just reading the script, and then when you get the picture in, it's different, and you kind of switch to another vibe and change stuff and start experimenting a lot with the music." Gonzalez added, "I worked with Joseph a lot, and he's very particular about the music in his movies, so we spent a lot of time talking about music and working the arrangements together."

Back Lot Music released the soundtrack on April 16, 2013. A deluxe edition of the soundtrack was released the same day exclusively through iTunes. It features an additional 13 tracks. The soundtrack featured original music by M83, along with music composed by Gonzalez and Trapanese. The lyrics to "Oblivion" were written by Gonzalez and Susanne Sundfør. Metacritic rated the soundtrack 55/100.

== Release ==
=== Marketing ===
Details about Oblivion were kept secret, though the studio was said to have been "very excited" about the film. Promotions began in April 2012, with a part of the footage being screened at the 2012 CinemaCon even though filming had begun just one month before the event. The footage was described as "a combination of early concept art, rough animation, and unfinished dailies", showcasing a glimpse of the film's landscapes.

=== Theatrical release ===
Oblivion was first presented in Buenos Aires on March 26, 2013, Dublin on April 3, and in Hollywood on April 10 at the Dolby Theatre where Cruise himself announced before the screening that the film was actually the first feature to be mixed completely "from start to finish" in the latest state-of-the-art Dolby Atmos surround sound.

=== Home media ===
The DVD and Blu-ray for Oblivion became available online for pre-order in North America on April 24, 2013, just five days after its initial release in the region. One month later it was announced that the United Kingdom branch of Universal Studios would be releasing the film on home video in its region on August 6, 2013, with the on-demand version on August 18, 2013. The release was scheduled to be in both a standard and a SteelBook Limited Edition form. In June 2013, it was announced that the film would be released on home video in America also on August 6, 2013. The Blu-ray releases features commentary with Tom Cruise and director Joseph Kosinski, deleted scenes, M83's isolated score, and a series of making-of featurettes. The Blu-ray debuted at number 1 in sales for its opening week. On August 9, 2016, the 4K Blu-Ray edition was released.

== Reception ==
=== Box office ===
In North America, the film earned US$37.1 million on its opening weekend, including US$5.5 million from IMAX screenings in 323 theaters, making it Cruise's best North American opening after Top Gun: Maverick, Mission: Impossible film series and War of the Worlds.

The film closed on June 27, 2013. Oblivion grossed US$89.1 million in the U.S. and US$198.8 million internationally, bringing the worldwide total to US$287.9 million.

=== Critical response ===
On review aggregation website Rotten Tomatoes, the film has an approval rating of 53% based on 254 reviews and an average score of 5.90/10. The site's critical consensus reads, "Visually striking but thinly scripted, Oblivion benefits greatly from its strong production values and an excellent performance from Tom Cruise." Metacritic gives the film a score of 54 out of 100 based on 41 critics, indicating "mixed or average reviews". Audiences polled by CinemaScore gave the film an average grade of "B-" on an A+ to F scale.

Todd McCarthy of The Hollywood Reporter stated "Oblivion is an absolutely gorgeous film dramatically caught between its aspirations for poetic romanticism and the demands of heavy sci-fi action". Justin Chang of Variety said "Insofar as Oblivion is first and foremost a visual experience, a movie to be seen rather than a puzzle to be deciphered, its chief pleasures are essentially spoiler-proof." Kevin Harley of Total Film gave the film three stars out of five and said "It isn't a reboot or reimagining, refreshingly, but Oblivion plays like a stylised remix of superior sci-fi ground-breakers". Andrew O'Hehir of Salon praised it as a "sly, surprising and visually magnificent Tom Cruise vehicle that has forced me – and many other people, I suspect – to revise my first opinion of director Joseph Kosinski."

Tasha Robinson from The A.V. Club states that an "unsettling sense of not-quite-right coats all of the film's steely surfaces, and Kosinski and his co-writers give audiences plenty of time to absorb the unease and gear up for the action". Some reviewers noted the filmmakers' ambition. James Berardinelli of ReelViews calls the film "imperfect but some of its imperfections result from being overly ambitious". Bill Goodykoontz from the Arizona Republic states that the film "may not live up fully to its grand ambitions, but it isn't for lack of trying". Jake Coyle of the Associated Press states that "[f]or those who enjoy the simple thrill of handsomely stylized image-making, Oblivion is mostly mesmerizing." Alan Scherstuhl from the Village Voice states that "Kosinski proves himself talented in ways his Tron: Legacy didn't suggest."

Kenneth Turan from the Los Angeles Times called the film "[m]ore adventurous than your typical Hollywood tent pole, Oblivion makes you remember why science fiction movies pulled you in way back when and didn't let you go." Michael O'Sullivan of The Washington Post states that "[i]f you're able to forgive and forget, Oblivion isn't a bad place to start loving Tom Cruise all over again." Steven Rea of The Philadelphia Inquirer states that "[Cruise] oversees some pretty impressive stuff here, from the drones that ping-pong around in the air to the bubbleship that Jack uses to go to and fro to that awesome house with its panoramic views." Peter Howell of the Toronto Star states that the film "gives us stars in the cast, stars in our eyes and it even tweaks a brain cell or three".

Colin Covert from the Minneapolis Star Tribune states that the "film is rife with elements from its finest predecessors – Kubrick, Lucas, the Wachowskis, and Pixar could be listed as creative consultants – but it has the spirit of a love letter to classic sci-fi, not an opportunistic mash-up". Cary Darling of the Fort Worth Star-Telegram states that the film is "stitched together from spare bits of other, often better films, stumbl[ing] awkwardly in story and plot, shuffling toward the predictable explosions and fireballs of the third act. Yet... Oblivion is so beautiful to look at."

Richard Corliss of Time stated that "[i]n space, Jack [Harper] hopes, someone may hear you dream. But in a movie theater, no one will see you yawn." Anthony Lane of The New Yorker states that the film "[f]eels ever more grounded and stuck." Richard Roeper of Richard Roeper.com called it the "sci-fi movie equivalent of a pretty damn good cover band". Tom Charity of CNN.com called it "[g]lossy, derivative, ambitious and fatally underpowered." J. R. Jones of the Chicago Reader states that the "story eventually devolves into a grab bag of sci-fi tropes but, as with so many other Cruise productions, the sheer scale of everything is so mind-numbing that you may not notice". Rick Groen of Canada's The Globe and Mail called it "an okay blockbuster, a multimillion-dollar exercise in competence".

Tom Long of the Detroit News states that "Kosinski offers plenty of action here, and he lets the plot reveals bleed out slowly (explanations keep coming right to the end)." Long states that "a great deal is derivative, but it's fast-moving derivative". Stephen Whitty of the Newark Star-Ledger states that the movie "combines a lot of different films, yet somehow remains less than the sum of its parts". Claudia Puig of USA Today states that "Kosinski focuses on cool visuals but stints on a compelling plot. It's a dazzler, but the story lacks the impact of the futuristic look." Joe Morgenstern of The Wall Street Journal states that the "mystery posed by Oblivion as a whole is why its mysteries are posed so clumsily and worked out so murkily".

Manohla Dargis of The New York Times states that the "agony of being a longtime Tom Cruise fan has always been a burden, but now it's just, well, dispiriting". Rafer Guzman of Newsday states that "[p]laying spot-the-influence is the most fun you'll have during this expensive-looking, slow-moving plod through familiar territory." Joe Williams of the St. Louis Post-Dispatch states that "[i]nstead of developing characters, Kosinski pours most of his imagination into the annihilated landscapes and futuristic gadgetry." Michael Phillips of the Chicago Tribune states that "[w]hen you go to a futuristic, dystopian, post-apocalyptic barn dance starring Tom Cruise and his space guns, you expect a little zap with your thoughtful pauses." Peter Travers of Rolling Stone calls it "arid and antiseptic, untouched by human hands".

Rene Rodriguez of the Miami Herald states that the "filmmakers don't even have the courage to see the story to its proper end, opting for a ridiculous finale that feels vaguely insulting". Soren Anderson from The Seattle Times states that "[y]ou start wondering whether director Joseph Kosinski and screenwriters Karl Gajdusek and Michael DeBruyn have any original ideas of their own. And then you realize they don't." Randy Myers of the San Jose Mercury News states that the "mix of gee-whiz gadgetry and the day-to-day routineness of Jack and Victoria's lives is interesting enough, but the film is too glacially paced for it to work". Chris Nashawaty of Entertainment Weekly states that "[a]ll the eye candy in the world can't mask the sensation that you've seen this all before...and done better. Too bad the movie's script wasn't given the same attention as its sleek, brave-new-world look."

== See also ==
- List of dystopian films
- List of films featuring drones
- List of films featuring space stations
- Moon (2009 film)
