= Joseph Trapanese =

American composer (born 1984)

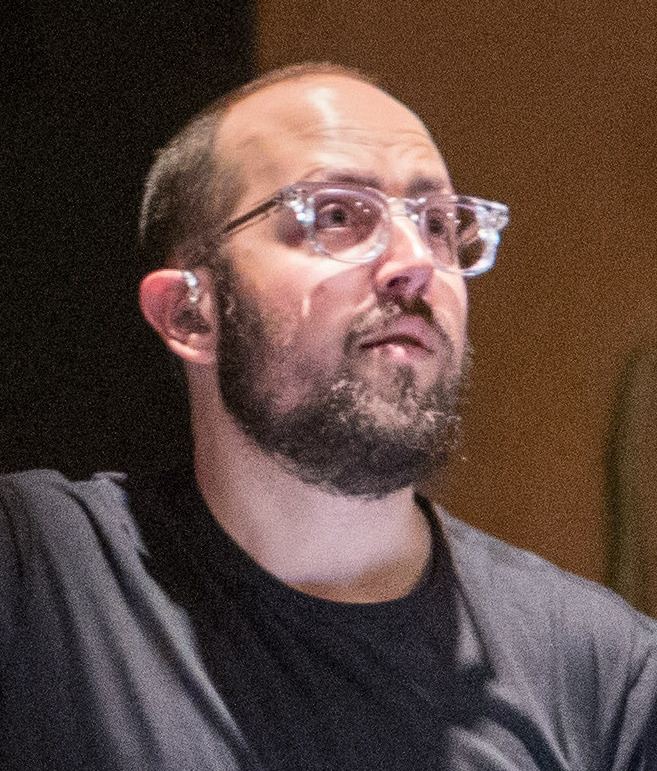
- Trapanese in 2019

Background information
- Born: August 7, 1984 (age 42)
- Origin: New Jersey, United States
- Genres: Film score; pop; jazz; ambient; electronic
- Occupations: Film composer; orchestrator; arranger; conductor; music producer
- Instruments: Piano; keyboards; synthesizer; trombone
- Years active: 2006–present
- Website: joecomposer.com

Joseph Trapanese (born August 7, 1984) is an American composer, conductor, arranger, and music producer. He works in the production of music for films, television, records, theater, concerts, and interactive media.

== Early life and education ==
Raised in Jersey City, New Jersey, Trapanese attended Dr. Ronald E. McNair Academic High School before moving on to the Manhattan School of Music.

== Film and television music ==
=== Early career ===
Trapanese began his composing career by collaborating with Daft Punk (Thomas Bangalter and Guy-Manuel de Homem-Christo) on the soundtrack for the Walt Disney Pictures film Tron: Legacy. His arrangements for the soundtrack have been described as "resolutely grand" and "stirring... ominous, hypnotic". The BBC described the work as "a sophisticated integration of acoustic and electronic instrumentation... majestic… rich, solemn tones… saturnine orchestration and a muscular rhythm”.

=== 2011–present ===
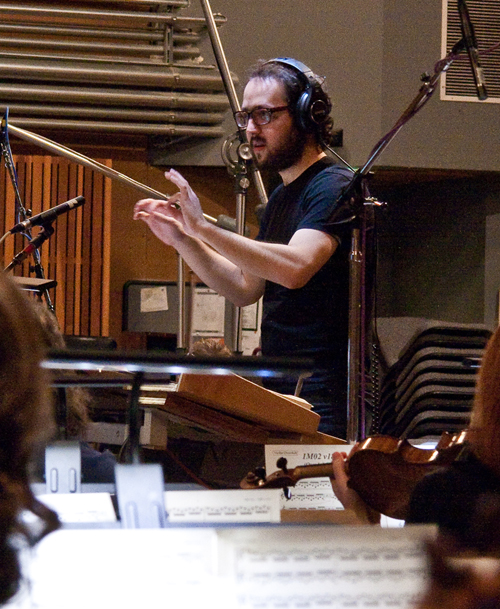
Trapanese in 2013

Trapanese has composed for numerous projects, including Disney XD's animated series Tron: Uprising, Sony Pictures Classics' The Raid: Redemption (cocomposed with Mike Shinoda of Linkin Park), Sony Pictures Television's original web series The Bannen Way, the independent feature Mamitas (featured at the 2011 Los Angeles Film Festival), and numerous live-action and animated films from UCLA's School of Theater, Film and Television. Trapanese contributed musical arrangements to Percy Jackson & the Olympians: The Lightning Thief, What Happens in Vegas and Traitor. Alongside composer Daniel Licht, Trapanese produced and orchestrated the scores for seasons 3 and 4 of Showtime's original series Dexter, and provided orchestrations for seasons 5 and 6. The 2012 teaser trailer for Iron Man 3 features Trapanese's composition Something to Fight For.

His career eventually lead to working on major studio feature films working solo and alongside recording artists. Some of his well known credits include Universal Studios's Straight Outta Compton, Lionsgate Films's The Divergent Series: Insurgent, Sony Pictures Classics' The Raid 2, and Universal Studios's Oblivion (co-composed with Anthony Gonzalez of M83).

In 2017, he scored the Sony Pictures film Only the Brave, marking his third collaboration with director Joseph Kosinski, and co-scored the 20th Century Fox musical drama The Greatest Showman alongside composer John Debney. For the latter, he produced several of the chart-topping songs from the film written by Academy Award-winning songwriters Benj Pasek and Justin Paul.

== Music collaboration with artists ==
Following his collaborations with Daft Punk on Tron: Legacy, Anthony Gonzalez (M83) on Oblivion, and Mike Shinoda (Linkin Park) on The Raid: Redemption, Trapanese continues to work with artists in film scoring, album production, and live events.

On August 7, 2015 Dr. Dre released his long-awaited third album Compton which featured string arrangements by Trapanese and Jennifer Hammond. They were conducted by Trapanese at the Straight Outta Compton scoring sessions at the Sony Pictures Studios scoring stage in Culver City.

On February 27, 2015 Kelly Clarkson released her seventh album Piece by Piece which featured an orchestra arranged and conducted by Trapanese recorded at EastWest Studios in Hollywood. He collaborated with producers Greg Kurstin, Jesse Shatkin, and Jason Halbert on the project.

On September 22, 2013, Trapanese performed with M83 at the Hollywood Bowl as conductor of the Hollywood Bowl Orchestra. For the concert, Trapanese arranged new orchestral material for songs from Before The Dawn Heals Us, Saturdays=Youth, Hurry Up, We're Dreaming, and Oblivion. He also arranged and conducted an orchestra for M83's show at Central Park Summerstage in New York City on August 8, 2012.

Released on October 25, 2013, by RCA Records, Kelly Clarkson's Wrapped in Red features an orchestra arranged and conducted by Trapanese. Produced by Greg Kurstin, it is Clarkson's first Christmas-themed release, featuring cover versions of various Christmas standards in addition to original material. As part of the album's promotion, on October 30, 2013, Trapanese led the orchestra for Kelly Clarkson's Cautionary Christmas Music Tale at The Venetian Las Vegas, which was broadcast on NBC on December 11, 2013.

Trapanese collaborated with Active Child on the arrangement of "Silhouette" (featuring Ellie Goulding) for his 2013 EP Rapor. In addition to the album, he provided new string and choir arrangements for his performances in Melbourne, London, New York City, Chicago, and Los Angeles.

For 2012's The Bourne Legacy, Trapanese worked with Moby on a new orchestral version of his "Extreme Ways".

On October 18, 2011, M83's double-disc album Hurry Up, We're Dreaming released with five tracks arranged by Trapanese. Trapanese's work can be heard on "Intro", "Wait", "Soon, My Friend", "My Tears Are Becoming a Sea", and "Outro".

Trapanese co-wrote and co-produced the song "Do or Die" with 3OH!3 from their album Omens.

In 2023, Trapanese collaborated with American chiptune band Anamanaguchi on the anime series Scott Pilgrim Takes Off for Netflix.

== Music for live theater ==
The music Trapanese has produced for theater is performed primarily in New York City, most notably in productions by The Actors Company Theatre. Recent productions that he has provided music for include T. S. Eliot's The Cocktail Party, Arthur Miller's Incident at Vichy, Václav Havel's The Memorandum, and Edward Bond's The Sea. His music for the production of Milan Stitt's The Runner Stumbles was described by the New York Times as "Precise and evocative... wistful, ringing melodies”.

== Awards and honors ==
- In 2012, Trapanese was nominated for an IFMCA Award for 'Breakthrough Film Composer of the Year' by the International Film Music Critics Association
- In 2013, Joseph was nominated for Discovery of the Year for Oblivion at the World Soundtrack Academy Awards in Ghent, Belgium.
- In 2013, Trapanese was nominated for the ASCAP Composers’ Choice Award for the movie Oblivion.
- In 2015, Trapanese was nominated for Best Original Song Written for a Film from Insurgent for the song "Carry Me Home" at the World Soundtrack Academy Awards
- In 2015, Trapanese won the Black Reel Award for Outstanding Score for the film Straight Outta Compton.
- In 2018, Trapanese was nominated for a Saturn Award for Best Music for The Greatest Showman (shared with John Debney)

== Education ==
Trapanese completed his bachelor's degree in composition at the Manhattan School of Music, and later an M.A. in Music for Visual Media at UCLA, with support from the Henry Mancini fund. Joseph's tutors included Giampaolo Bracali, Bruce Broughton, Paul Chihara, Roger Bourland, Jack Smalley, and Martin Bresnick, and he also engaged in brief studies with Louis Andriessen, Aaron Jay Kernis, Julia Wolfe, Mark Snow, and Ira Newborn. From 2008 to 2011, Trapanese taught the Electronic Music and Composition curriculum at UCLA's Herb Alpert School of Music.

== Filmography ==
=== Film ===
Year	Title	Director(s)	Notes
2009	Countdown: Jerusalem	Adam Silver	
2010	Tron: Legacy	Joseph Kosinski	Composed by Daft Punk; Arranger and orchestrator First collaboration with Joseph Kosinski
2011	Mamitas	Nicholas Ozeki	
2011	The Raid	Gareth Evans	Composed with Mike Shinoda, Aria Prayogi and Fajar Yuskemal; First collaboration with Gareth Evans
2013	Oblivion	Joseph Kosinski	Composed with M83; Second collaboration with Joseph Kosinski
2014	The Raid 2	Gareth Evans	Composed with Aria Prayogi and Fajar Yuskemal; Second collaboration with Gareth Evans
2014	Earth to Echo	Dave Green	
2014	Stand	Cosmos Kiindarius	
2014	Transformers: Age of Extinction	Michael Bay	Additional music Score composed by Steve Jablonsky
2015	The Divergent Series: Insurgent	Robert Schwentke	First collaboration with Robert Schwentke
2015	Straight Outta Compton	F. Gary Gray	
2016	The Divergent Series: Allegiant	Robert Schwentke	Second collaboration with Robert Schwentke
2016	The Siege of Jadotville	Richie Smyth	
2017	Only the Brave	Joseph Kosinski	Third collaboration with Joseph Kosinski
2017	Wolf Warrior 2	Wu Jing	
2017	Shimmer Lake	Oren Uziel	
2017	The Greatest Showman	Michael Gracey	Composed with John Debney; Original songs by Benj Pasek and Justin Paul
2018	Arctic	Joe Penna	
2018	Robin Hood	Otto Bathurst	
2018	Sprinter	Storm Saulter	
2019	Stuber	Michael Dowse	First collaboration with Michael Dowse
2019	Lady and the Tramp	Charlie Bean	
2020	Coffee & Kareem	Michael Dowse	Second collaboration with Michael Dowse
2020	Project Power	Henry Joost; Ariel Schulman	
2020	Spontaneous	Brian Duffield	First collaboration with Brian Duffield
2021	Finding 'Ohana	Jude Weng	
2021	Prisoners of the Ghostland	Sion Sono	
2021	Happily	BenDavid Grabinski	
2021	8-Bit Christmas	Michael Dowse	Third collaboration with Michael Dowse
2022	Spiderhead	Joseph Kosinski	Performed by The London Contemporary Orchestra Fourth collaboration with Joseph Kosinski
2023	The Machine	Peter Atencio	
2023	No One Will Save You	Brian Duffield	Second collaboration with Brian Duffield
2023	Postcard from Earth	Darren Aronofsky	Composed with The Echo Society
2025	The Witcher: Sirens of the Deep	Kang Hei Chul	
2025	G20	Patricia Riggen	
2025	David	Phil Cunningham; Brent Dawes	First score for an animated film Original songs by Jonas Myrin
2026	He Bled Neon	Drew Kirsch	Composed with Zhu
2026	Mike & Nick & Nick & Alice	BenDavid Grabinski	
2026	Whalefall	Brian Duffield	Third collaboration with Brian Duffield
2027	Animal Friends	Peter Atencio	

=== Television ===
Year	Title	Notes
2009–10	The Bannen Way	16 episodes
2010–11	Suite 7	2 episodes
2012–13	Tron: Uprising	19 episodes
2016	Dead of Summer	10 episodes
2016–17	Quantico	20 episodes
2016–17	Jean-Claude Van Johnson	6 episodes
2018	Unsolved	10 episodes
2018	Berlin Station	10 episodes
2019	Are You Afraid of the Dark?: Carnival of Doom	3 episodes Composed with Jason Lazarus
2021–23	Shadow and Bone	16 episodes
2021–present	The Witcher	Seasons 2-5; 32 episodes
2023	Skull Island	8 episodes Composed with Jason Lazarus
2023	Scott Pilgrim Takes Off	8 episodes Composed with Anamanaguchi
2024–26	Brilliant Minds	33 episodes

=== Video games ===
Year	Title	Developer	Publisher
2014	The Crew	Ivory Tower	Ubisoft
2017	Need for Speed Payback	Ghost Games	Electronic Arts
2020	Star Wars: Tales From the Galaxy's Edge	ILMxLab	Disney Electronic Content
