= Morgan Kibby =

American musician

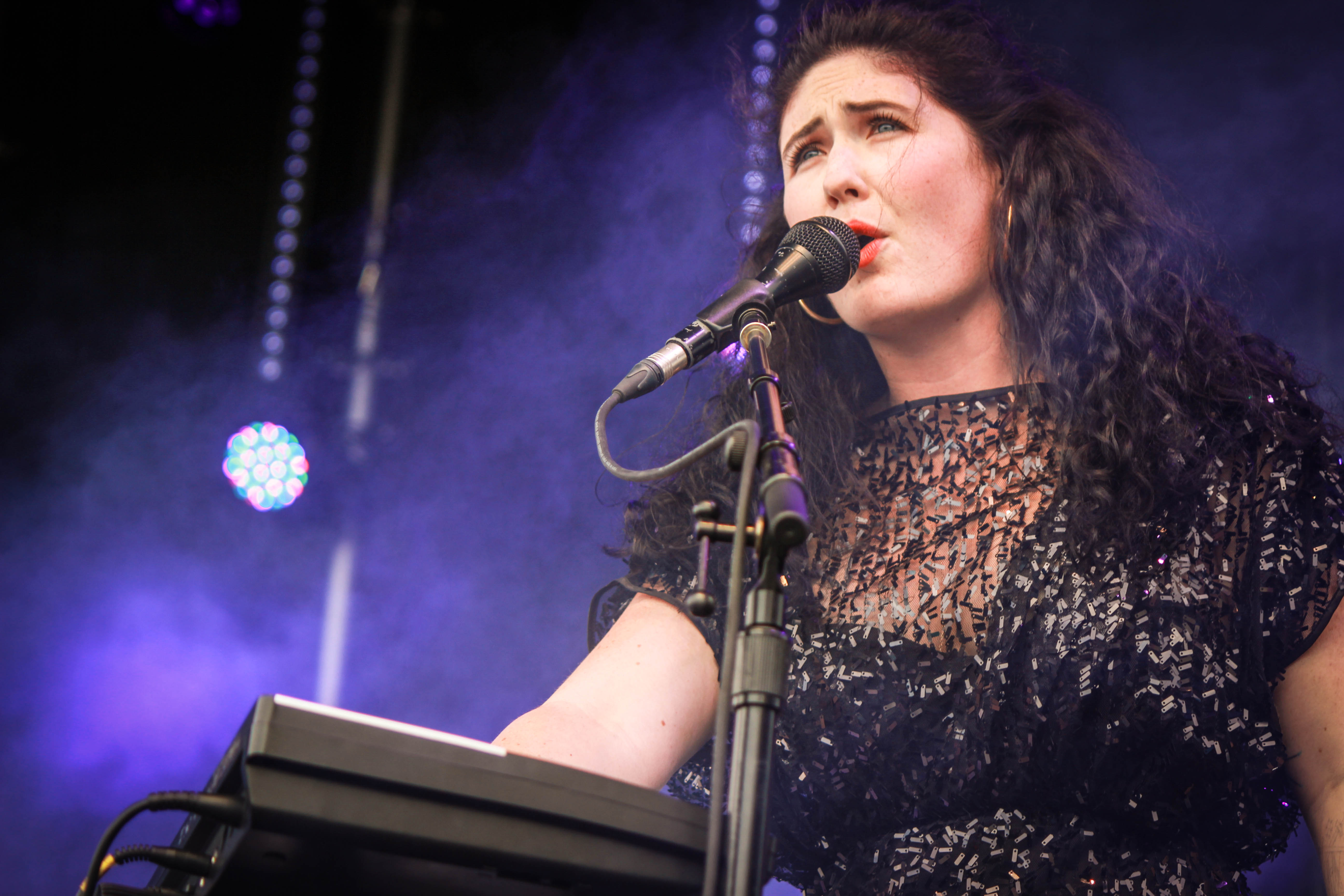
- Kibby performing as White Sea in 2014

Background information
- Also known as: White Sea; Sue Clayton
- Born: Morgan Grace Kibby; May 3, 1984 (age 42); Utqiagvik, Alaska, U.S.
- Origin: San Francisco, California, U.S.
- Genres: Electronic; synthpop; dream pop; ambient
- Occupations: Composer; producer; singer; songwriter
- Instruments: Piano; keyboard; vocals
- Years active: 1997–present
- Labels: Obscura; Crush; True Velvet; Les Disques du Crépuscule
- Formerly of: The Romanovs; M83
- Website: morgankibby.com

Morgan Grace Kibby (born May 3, 1984) is an American singer, songwriter, record producer, composer, and former actress based in Los Angeles, California. She is best known as a member and collaborator of the French electronic group M83 between 2008 and 2015. Prior to joining M83, she was the frontwoman of the Romanovs, releasing one studio album in 2005. In 2014, Kibby began recording and releasing material under the moniker White Sea. In 2023, she released Rookie under the alias Sue Clayton.

Following her departure from M83, Kibby began collaborating with Panic! at the Disco in a songwriting and session capacity, contributing to the albums Death of a Bachelor (2016), Pray for the Wicked (2018) and Viva Las Vengeance (2022). In 2019, Kibby contributed keyboards, moog bass and backing vocals to the title track of Harry Styles's second studio album Fine Line, and in 2020, she co-wrote and produced the orchestral interludes on Lady Gaga's sixth studio album, Chromatica (2020), with a 26-piece orchestra.

In 2023, Kibby provided the original music for the Amazon TV series The Power.

== Early life ==
Born in Utqiagvik, Alaska to Charles and Lauri, Kibby grew up in San Francisco where she took vocal training, as well as studied piano and cello in her teens. She also performed as part of the chorus of the San Francisco Opera. From 1999–2002, she played the role of Gwen Taylor in the Nickelodeon series 100 Deeds for Eddie McDowd.

In 2003, Kibby released an EP entitled Beggar's Alchemy, doing vocals, cello, and piano. Soon after the release she began performing with the musicians that would form the Romanovs, including Dan Rosa and Paul Wiancko.

In 2005, the band released the album ...And the Moon Was Hungry.... For a short time the group were just known as "Morgan" and soon after evolved into "Morgan and the Hidden Hands". In 2007, the band started to remix and remaster their first release. Percussion, cello, violin, piano and vocals were added to former tracks as well as two new studio recordings titled "Fever Pitch" and "Mr. Okada". This was the first release with the band operating under their new name of the Romanovs. In 2007, they won a Toronto Independent Music Awards for Best USA Band. The same year the band went on hiatus while Kibby joined M83.

== M83 ==
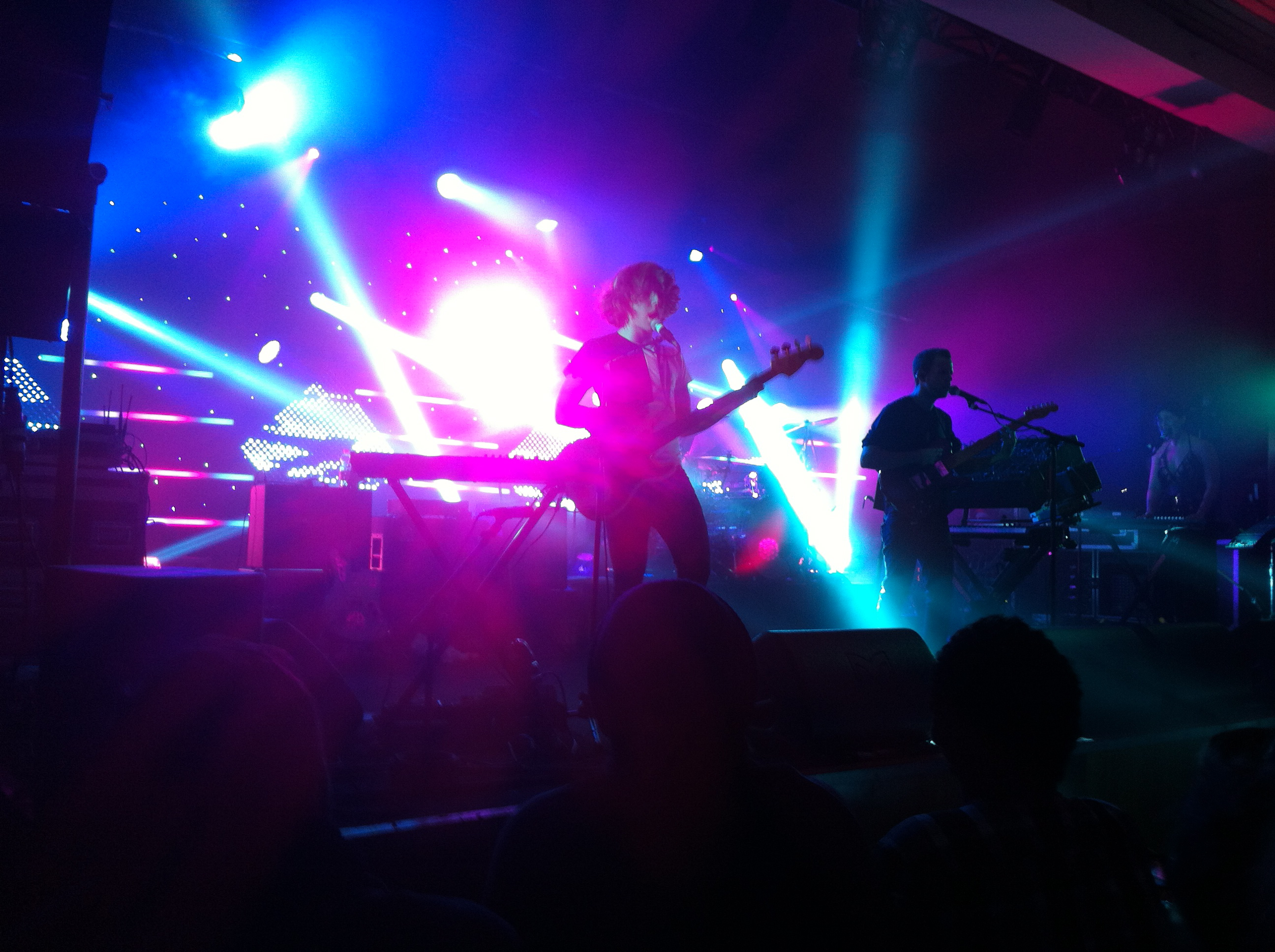
Jordan Lawlor, Anthony Gonzalez and Morgan Kibby in Berlin

Kibby provided keys and arrangements for M83 on their fifth full-length release, Saturdays = Youth, and co-wrote the songs "Kim & Jessie", "Up!", "Too Late" and "Skin of the Night". Subsequently, she toured with the band throughout Australia, Europe and the United States in 2008. She continued to tour with M83 in 2009 as they opened for Kings of Leon in the UK, The Killers on their US tour and for some dates of Depeche Mode's Tour of the Universe. In 2011, Kibby contributed to M83's sixth full-length album Hurry Up, We're Dreaming; providing vocals, keyboards and arrangements. She co-wrote the songs "Intro", "Midnight City", and "Reunion". On collaborating with Anthony Gonzalez, she stated, "I take a lot of inspiration from watching him work and working with him." In December 2015, it was revealed that Kibby was no longer part of M83.

=== White Sea and solo career ===
Kibby has embarked on a solo project since touring with M83, called White Sea, which is a translation of her name. Her first track, a remix of Solid Gold's "Synchronize", first appeared on her MySpace. A second track titled "Overdrawn" was released to her MySpace in March, revealing a new musical direction for Kibby. On September 30, a new track, "Mountaineer", became available for free download on the RCRD LBL website. An EP, This Frontier, was released on October 5, 2010, which she later described as 'a little scattered. Lots of disco references for the guitars. Still all layered with big, thick, '70s and '80s synths'. Since the release of This Frontier, Kibby focused on remixing tracks for other artists and developing her style. The self-produced In Cold Blood, Kibby's first full-length album, was released in May 2014 via Crush Music and Songs Publishing, and features songs co-written with Greg Kurstin and Mark Ronson. She described it as a break-up record where she "had to express myself through my music. It was the only way to purge myself of this extreme grief and loss". The album was toured as support to The Naked and Famous.

After In Cold Blood she has released a series of singles under a new maxim to share music freely, without the need for EPs or albums. Upon the release of the fourth of these singles, "Arcadia" (2016), she announced she would be releasing these singles with accompanying video components, starting with "Arcadia". She also composed the soundtrack for Eva Husson's Bang Gang in 2016. and featured on Big Data's song "The Business of Emotion" (2015).

== Discography ==
=== Albums ===
- ...And the Moon Was Hungry... (2007) as the Romanovs
- Saturdays = Youth (2008) with M83
- Hurry Up, We're Dreaming (2011) with M83
- In Cold Blood (2014) as White Sea
- Tropical Odds (2017) as White Sea
- Rookie (2023) as Sue Clayton

=== EPs ===
- Beggar's Alchemy (2003)
- ...And the Moon Was Hungry... (2004/2005) as The Romanovs
- This Frontier (2010) as White Sea

=== Singles ===
- "Stay Young, Get Stoned" (2015)
- "Never a Woman" (2015)
- "Gangster No. 1" (2015)
- "Arcadia" (2016)
- "Bloodline" (2016)
- "Secret" (2016)
- "Ellipses" (2016)
- "Yesterday" (2016)
- "Bloodmoon" (2016)
