= Hurry Up, We're Dreaming =

Studio album by M83
- Released: 18 October 2011
- Recorded: 2010–2011
- Studios: Sunset Sound (Los Angeles); The Sound Factory (Los Angeles); Justin's studio; Electro-Vox (Los Angeles); OTM; M83 Studio (Antibes, France)
- Genres: Synth-pop; ambient; shoegaze
- Length: 73:20
- Label: Naïve
- Producers: Justin Meldal-Johnsen; Anthony Gonzalez

M83 chronology
| Saturdays = Youth (2008) | Hurry Up, We're Dreaming (2011) | Junk (2016) |

10th Anniversary reissue

Singles from Hurry Up, We're Dreaming
- 1. "Midnight City" Released: 16 August 2011; 2. "Reunion" Released: 5 February 2012; 3. "OK Pal" Released: 30 July 2012; 4. "Steve McQueen" Released: 27 November 2012; 5. "Wait" Released: 5 December 2012

Hurry Up, We're Dreaming (stylised as HurryUp,We'reDreaming.) is the sixth studio album by French electronic music band M83. The album was released on 18 October 2011, by Naïve Records in France and by Mute Records in the United States. The album was the last M83 album with keyboardist Morgan Kibby before her departure, and the band's first full double album.

The album received generally favourable reviews from critics. It debuted at number 15 on the US Billboard 200 with first-week sales of 21,000 copies, making it M83's highest-charting album to date. It sold 300,000 copies in the United States as of March 2016. The album was nominated for Best Alternative Music Album at the 2013 Grammy Awards and was ranked at number 134 on Pitchfork's list of "The 200 Best Albums of the 2010s" in October 2019.

== Background and recording ==
Prior to recording Hurry Up, We're Dreaming, M83 frontman Anthony Gonzalez moved from France to Los Angeles, United States. Describing the move in an interview, Gonzalez said, "Having spent 29 years of my life in France, I moved to California a year and a half before the making of this album and I was excited and inspired by so many different things: by the landscape, by the way of life, by live shows, by movies, by the road trips I took alone... I was feeling alive again and this is, I feel, something that you can hear on the album." Gonzalez toured with the Killers, Depeche Mode, and Kings of Leon before recording, which influenced the album. He was also influenced by his road trips to Joshua Tree National Park.

Gonzalez cited the ambitiousness of albums such as Mellon Collie and the Infinite Sadness by the Smashing Pumpkins as the reason Hurry Up, We're Dreaming was made a double album. He described the two discs as brother and sister, with each track having a sibling on the other disc.

Gonzalez created the album to remember his childhood. Gonzalez explained to Spin that Hurry Up, We're Dreaming is "mainly about dreams, how everyone is different, how you dream differently when you're a kid, a teenager, or an adult. I'm really proud of it. If you're doing a very long album, all the songs need to be different and I think I've done that with this one." In an interview with musicOMH, he described the album as "a reflection of my 30 years as a human being" and something he dedicated to himself.

The album was recorded in Los Angeles at Sunset Sound and the Sound Factory. Because of budget constraints and union issues, the string and brass players who contributed to the album were not paid and were credited with pseudonyms. The album features contributions from Medicine's Brad Laner and Zola Jesus.

== Style ==
Anthony Gonzalez compared Hurry Up, We're Dreaming's sound to two of his previous releases, describing it as a mix between the synth-pop used on Saturdays = Youth (2008) and the ambient of Before the Dawn Heals Us (2005). The album includes instruments previously unused by M83, such as the acoustic guitar, flute and saxophone. Critics have noted musical influences from 1980s artists, including Kraftwerk, Simple Minds, Peter Gabriel and Harold Faltermeyer, as well as synth-pop band Cut Copy.

== Release ==
Hurry Up, We're Dreaming was first teased on 23 June 2011 in a YouTube video titled "Echoes...", which also announced dates for a North American tour. The album's lead single, "Midnight City", premiered online on 19 July 2011, and was officially released on 16 August 2011. On 10 October 2011, the album became available to be streamed in its entirety on the Urban Outfitters website. Urban Outfitters also hosted a simultaneous listening party at all of its stores the Saturday before Hurry Up, We're Dreaming's release. On 17 October 2011, the music video for "Midnight City" was released.

The album was released on 18 October 2011, by Naïve Records in France and by Mute Records in the United States. On 30 May 2012, a music video for the album's second single, "Reunion", was released. The video is a follow-up to the "Midnight City" music video. M83 released a music video for "Steve McQueen" on 25 October 2012. On 5 November 2012, a three-disc deluxe edition featuring remixes of "Midnight City", "Reunion" and "Steve McQueen" was announced. On 5 December 2012, a music video for "Wait" was released. The album's closer "Outro" was used in the extended trailer for 2012 film Cloud Atlas as well as other trailers and films over the following years.

== Critical reception ==
Professional ratings
Aggregate scores
| Source | Rating |
|---|---|
| AnyDecentMusic? | 7.5/10 |
| Metacritic | 76/100 |
Review scores
| Source | Rating |
| AllMusic | 5/5 stars |
| The A.V. Club | B− |
| The Daily Telegraph | 4/5 stars |
| Entertainment Weekly | B+ |
| NME | 7/10 |
| The Observer | 3/5 stars |
| Pitchfork | 9.1/10 |
| Q | 4/5 stars |
| Rolling Stone | 3/5 stars |
| Spin | 7/10 |

Hurry Up, We're Dreaming received generally positive reviews from music critics. At Metacritic, which assigns a normalised rating out of 100, derived from reviews from mainstream critics, the album received a score of 76, based on 38 reviews.

Pitchfork's Ian Cohen gave the album its "Best New Music" accolade, considering it the band's best record to date. Cohen also noted the reduction of the "heavily saturated synths" of Anthony Gonzalez's earlier work in favour of more accessible songs, adding that "the traditionally structured songs here are some of the most thrilling pop music released this year." Similarly, The Daily Telegraph's James Lachno felt that the album "finally fuses his innate ingenuity with an accessible, commercial edge." Rudy Klapper of Sputnikmusic praised the influence of 1980s music on the album, and called the record "near flawless, an essential distillation of the sounds of Gonzalez's youth, nostalgia and melancholy and happiness all mixed up into a sparkling pop stew." Simon Price of The Independent called the album "a towering city of sparkling synth edifices simultaneously summoning the best of the 1980s (New Order, The Cure) and the current breed (The Knife, Empire of the Sun)".

Under the Radar's Laura Studarus described Hurry Up, We're Dreaming as a "remarkable accomplishment" and a "double album of stunningly ambitious, synth-soaked dreams". Jamie Crossan of NME compared the album's "guileless and dreamy" nature to the title character of the 1943 novella The Little Prince and admitted that this comparison would be "quite a bold statement to make, but this is an album of equal valor." Reef Younis of BBC Music felt that while "some consistency may have been sacrificed in favor of a space-filling selection of tracks, this set still represents a heaving, breathing journey through the introspective and the bombastic, the striving and the exhaustive. It is the undeniable sound of one man's triumphant dreams." Heather Phares of AllMusic wrote that while the album "may not be quite as striking as Saturdays = Youth, it delivers a welcome mix of classic sounds and promising changes."

David Marchese of Spin felt that Hurry Up, We're Dreaming is "full of goose-bump moments", but that the "lack of something as enjoyably plain (and relatively calm) as 'Kim & Jessie'... makes Gonzalez's insistence on oversize emotions feel a tad restrictive." In a similarly mixed review, Timothy Gabriele of PopMatters criticised M83 for "focusing too much on magnitude throughout and too little on depth" on the album, but noted that the "totality of sound" on the album "has a way of blinding even the most critical listener to the problems that underline many of the album's lesser songs". The A.V. Club's Christian Williams found the album underwhelming, writing, "for an album of such impressive scale and nanoscopic attention to detail, Dreams [sic] leaves a surprisingly light impression." Kevin Liedel of Slant Magazine criticised the album for rehashing sounds from earlier M83 albums and felt that it sounded "much more like an M83 wannabe's poor imitation than the real deal."

=== Accolades ===
Accolades for Hurry Up, We're Dreaming
| Publication | Country | Accolade | Year | Rank |
|---|---|---|---|---|
| eMusic | US | Best Albums of 2011 | 2011 | 2 |
| Filter | US | Top 10 of 2011 | 2011 | 1 |
| Paste | US | The 50 Best Albums of 2011 | 2011 | 9 |
| Pitchfork | US | Top 50 Albums of 2011 | 2011 | 3 |
| PopMatters | US | The 75 Best Albums of 2011 | 2011 | 5 |
| Spin | US | The 50 Best Albums of 2011 | 2011 | 19 |
| Stereogum | US | The 50 Best Albums of 2011 | 2011 | 12 |

Hurry Up, We're Dreaming appeared on several end-of-year lists. Filter named it the best album of 2011. Paste named the album as the ninth best album of 2011, writing "As with everything the Frenchman's done so far, the album is lush and ably produced, crescendo after crescendo." Pitchfork named it the third best album of 2011, with Jayson Greene writing: "Hurry Up We're Dreaming doesn't just draw liberally from the spirit of the massive rock albums Gonzalez name-checked, it practically swallows them whole, regurgitating and redistributing them into something listeners from every corner of the music universe can hear a piece of their lives in." Popmatters ranked the album as number five on its list of "The 75 Best Albums of 2011", while Spin ranked the album number 19 on its end-of-year list. Online music retailer eMusic ranked the album number two on its "Best Albums of 2011" list.

The lead single "Midnight City" was singled out for praise. Paste named it the second-best song of the year. PopMatters named it the best song of 2011, with Ryan Reed writing: "On this transcendent standout [...] Anthony Gonzalez and co-synth-scientist Justin Meldal-Johnsen build layer upon layer of keys, arena-sized drums, and vocal atmospherics (not mentioning one of the tastiest sax solos this side of a Springsteen record). The result? The synth Sistine Chapel."

== Tour ==
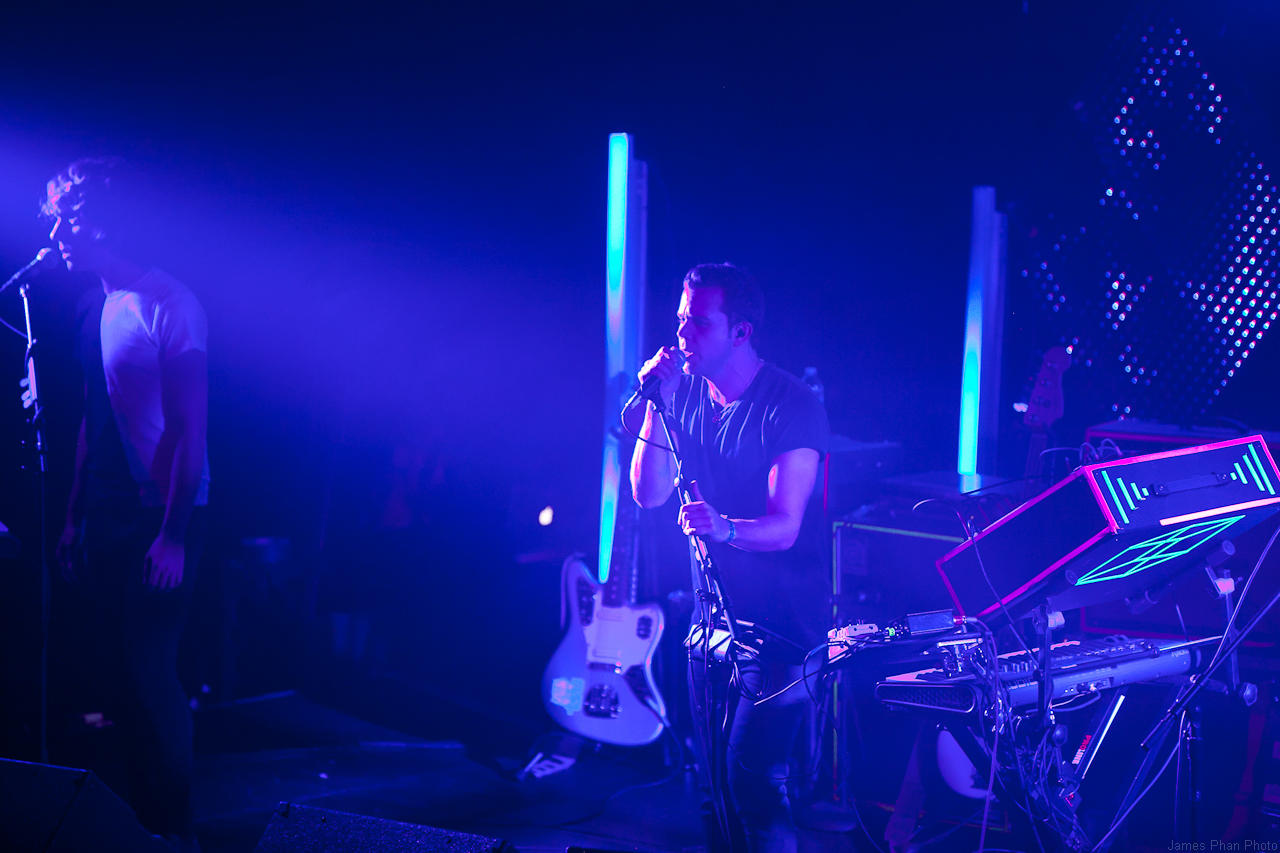
M83 performing on the Hurry Up, We're Dreaming tour, November 2011 at Music Box Theater

Prior to touring for Hurry Up, We're Dreaming, Anthony Gonzalez posted an open audition on M83's website for a multi-instrumentalist who could play guitar, bass and keyboards to join him on tour. Jordan Lawlor of Sparta Township, New Jersey was hired from the audition.

The tour for the album began in Mexico City on 15 October 2011 and ended on 1 December 2011 in London, England. The second leg of the tour began on 12 January 2012 in Los Angeles and was set to end on 8 August 2012 in New York City, but was later extended, ending in London on 8 November 2012. During the second leg, M83 performed at the 2012 Coachella Valley Music and Arts Festival on 13 and 20 April, at the St Jerome's Laneway Festival in Australia and New Zealand, and at Lollapalooza in Chicago, Illinois.

== Track listing ==
=== Original release ===
All music is composed by Anthony Gonzalez. Additional music is composed by Justin Meldal-Johnsen. Additional lyrics by Yann Gonzalez, Morgan Kibby and Brad Laner.

Disc one: Hurry Up
| No. | Title | Length |
|---|---|---|
| 1. | "Intro" | 5:22 |
| 2. | "Midnight City" | 4:03 |
| 3. | "Reunion" | 3:55 |
| 4. | "Where the Boats Go" | 1:46 |
| 5. | "Wait" | 5:43 |
| 6. | "Raconte-moi une histoire" | 4:04 |
| 7. | "Train to Pluton" | 1:15 |
| 8. | "Claudia Lewis" | 4:31 |
| 9. | "This Bright Flash" | 2:23 |
| 10. | "When Will You Come Home?" | 1:23 |
| 11. | "Soon, My Friend" | 3:09 |
| Total length: | | 37:34 |

Disc two: We're Dreaming
| No. | Title | Length |
|---|---|---|
| 1. | "My Tears Are Becoming a Sea" | 2:31 |
| 2. | "New Map" | 4:22 |
| 3. | "OK Pal" | 3:58 |
| 4. | "Another Wave from You" | 1:53 |
| 5. | "Splendor" | 5:06 |
| 6. | "Year One, One UFO" | 3:17 |
| 7. | "Fountains" | 1:21 |
| 8. | "Steve McQueen" | 3:48 |
| 9. | "Echoes of Mine" | 3:39 |
| 10. | "Klaus I Love You" | 1:44 |
| 11. | "Outro" | 4:07 |
| Total length: | | 35:46 |

Interlude
| No. | Title | Length |
|---|---|---|
| 0. | "Mirror" (downloadable bonus track) | 5:45 |

=== Deluxe edition ===
Deluxe edition disc three

1. "Midnight City" (Eric Prydz Private remix)
2. "Midnight City" (Trentemøller remix)
3. "Midnight City" (Team Ghost remix)
4. "Reunion" (Mylo remix)
5. "Reunion" (Sei A remix)
6. "Reunion" (White Sea remix)
7. "Steve McQueen" (Maps remix)
8. "Steve McQueen" (BeatauCue remix)

== Personnel ==
Credits adapted from the liner notes of Hurry Up, We're Dreaming.

=== Musicians ===
- Anthony Gonzalez – lead vocals (disc 1: tracks 1, 5, 6, 11; "Mirror"; disc 2: tracks 1–3, 8); background vocals (disc 1: tracks 1, 5, 6, 11; "Mirror"; disc 2: tracks 1–3, 5, 8, 9); keyboards (disc 1: tracks 1–9, 11; "Mirror"; disc 2: tracks 1, 2, 4–11); programming (disc 1: tracks 1–9; "Mirror"; disc 2: tracks 1, 2, 4–11); electric guitar (disc 1: tracks 1–3, 8, 9; "Mirror"; disc 2: tracks 1–3, 6, 8, 9, 11); vocals (disc 1: tracks 2, 3, 8, 9; disc 2: tracks 4, 6, 7, 10, 11); piano (disc 1: track 4); orchestral arrangements, conducting (disc 1: track 5); snaps (disc 1: track 6; disc 2: track 2); claps (disc 1: track 6; disc 2: track 5); synthesizer (disc 1: track 10)
- Zola Jesus – lead vocals (disc 1: track 1)
- Morgan Kibby – background vocals (disc 1: track 1); monologue (disc 1: track 3)
- Justin Meldal-Johnsen – keyboards (disc 1: tracks 1–6, 8, 11; "Mirror"; disc 2: tracks 1, 2, 4–11); programming (disc 1: tracks 1–6, 8; "Mirror"; disc 2: tracks 1, 2, 4–11); electric guitar (disc 1: tracks 1–3, 8, 9; "Mirror"; disc 2: tracks 1–3, 6, 8, 9, 11); bass guitar (disc 1: tracks 1, 3, 5, 6, 8, 9; "Mirror"; disc 2: tracks 1–3, 6, 8, 9, 11); acoustic guitar (disc 1: tracks 5, 6, 11; disc 2: tracks 5, 6, 11); snaps (disc 1: track 6; disc 2: track 2); claps (disc 1: track 6; disc 2: track 5); percussion (disc 1: track 8; "Mirror"; disc 2: tracks 2, 3); recorders (disc 1: track 10); mandolin (disc 1: track 11)
- Loïc Maurin – drums (disc 1: tracks 1, 3, 5, 6, 8, 9; "Mirror"; disc 2: tracks 1–3, 6, 8, 9, 11); snaps (disc 1: track 6; disc 2: track 2); claps (disc 1: track 6); percussion (disc 1: tracks 8, 9; "Mirror"; disc 2: track 2)
- Joey Waronker – orchestral percussion (disc 1: tracks 1, 11; disc 2: tracks 1, 5, 11); electronic drums, percussion (disc 1: track 8; "Mirror")
- The Orphans String and Brass Orchestra – orchestra (disc 1: tracks 1, 5, 11; disc 2: tracks 1, 11)
- Joseph Trapanese – orchestral arrangements, conducting (disc 1: tracks 1, 5, 11; disc 2: tracks 1, 11)
- James King – saxophone (disc 1: track 2); flute, baritone saxophone (disc 2: track 2)
- Gabriel Johnson – trumpet (disc 1: track 4)
- Brad Laner – background vocals (disc 1: track 5; disc 2: track 5); lead vocals (disc 2: track 5)
- Lyle Workman – acoustic guitar (disc 1: tracks 5, 6; disc 2: tracks 5, 6); tiple (disc 1: tracks 5, 6; disc 2: track 5); banjo, mandolin (disc 1: track 6); Marxophone (disc 2: track 5)
- The Purple Mixed Adult Choir – background vocals (disc 1: tracks 6, 11; "Mirror"; disc 2: track 2); claps (disc 2: track 5)
- Zelly Boo Meldal-Johnsen – monologue (disc 1: track 6)
- The Shakespeare Bridge Children's Choir – snaps, claps (disc 1: track 6); background vocals (disc 2: track 5)
- John Graney – whistle (disc 1: track 8)
- Chelsea Alden – monologue (disc 2: track 3)
- Patrick Warren – piano (disc 2: tracks 5, 11)
- Amy White – background vocals (disc 2: track 8)
- Lydie Benzakin – monologue (disc 2: track 9)
- Toni Kasza – The Shakespeare Bridge Children's Choir direction (disc 1: tracks 6, 11; "Mirror"; disc 2: tracks 2, 5)

=== Technical ===
- Justin Meldal-Johnsen – production, engineering
- Anthony Gonzalez – production
- Tony Hoffer – mixing (disc 1: tracks 1–3, 5, 6, 8, 9, 11; disc 2: tracks 1–3, 5, 6, 8, 9, 11)
- Antoine Gaillet – mixing (disc 1: tracks 4, 7, 10; disc 2: tracks 4, 7, 10)
- Todd Burke – engineering
- Mike Schuppan – additional engineering, engineering assistance
- Graham Hope – engineering assistance
- Cameron Lister – engineering assistance
- Dave Cooley – mastering

=== Artwork ===
- Anthony Gonzalez – art direction, design
- Anouck Bertin – art direction, design, photography
- Ashkahn Shahparnia – sleeve layout
- Shane Konen – sleeve layout

== Charts ==
=== Weekly charts ===
2011–2012 weekly chart performance for Hurry Up, We're Dreaming
| Chart (2011–2012) | Peak position |
|---|---|
| Australian Albums (ARIA) | 37 |
| Belgian Albums (Ultratop Flanders) | 30 |
| Belgian Albums (Ultratop Wallonia) | 36 |
| Canadian Albums (Nielsen SoundScan) | 37 |
| French Albums (SNEP) | 38 |
| Irish Albums (IRMA) | 53 |
| Norwegian Albums (VG-lista) | 18 |
| Scottish Albums (Official Charts) | 48 |
| Spanish Albums (Promusicae) | 70 |
| Swiss Albums (Schweizer Hitparade) | 65 |
| UK Albums (Official Charts) | 44 |
| UK Independent Albums (Official Charts) | 7 |
| US Billboard 200 | 15 |
| US Independent Albums (Billboard) | 3 |
| US Top Alternative Albums (Billboard) | 4 |
| US Top Dance/Electronic Albums (Billboard) | 1 |
| US Top Rock Albums (Billboard) | 5 |

2022 weekly chart performance for Hurry Up, We're Dreaming
| Chart (2022) | Peak position |
|---|---|
| Belgian Albums (Ultratop Wallonia) | 9 |
| Dutch Albums (Album Top 100) | 53 |
| German Albums (Offizielle Top 100) | 60 |
| Scottish Albums (Official Charts) | 9 |
| Swiss Albums (Schweizer Hitparade) | 15 |

2025 weekly chart performance for Hurry Up, We're Dreaming
| Chart (2025) | Peak position |
|---|---|
| Portuguese Albums (AFP) | 154 |

=== Year-end charts ===
2011 year-end chart performance for Hurry Up, We're Dreaming
| Chart (2011) | Position |
|---|---|
| US Top Dance/Electronic Albums (Billboard) | 21 |

2012 year-end chart performance for Hurry Up, We're Dreaming
| Chart (2012) | Position |
|---|---|
| French Albums (SNEP) | 138 |
| US Top Dance/Electronic Albums (Billboard) | 9 |
| US Top Rock Albums (Billboard) | 70 |

2020 year-end chart performance for Hurry Up, We're Dreaming
| Chart (2020) | Position |
|---|---|
| US Top Dance/Electronic Albums (Billboard) | 19 |

2021 year-end chart performance for Hurry Up, We're Dreaming
| Chart (2021) | Position |
|---|---|
| US Top Dance/Electronic Albums (Billboard) | 19 |

2022 year-end chart performance for Hurry Up, We're Dreaming
| Chart (2022) | Position |
|---|---|
| US Top Dance/Electronic Albums (Billboard) | 18 |

2023 year-end chart performance for Hurry Up, We're Dreaming
| Chart (2023) | Position |
|---|---|
| US Top Dance/Electronic Albums (Billboard) | 21 |

2024 year-end chart performance for Hurry Up, We're Dreaming
| Chart (2024) | Position |
|---|---|
| Australian Dance Albums (ARIA) | 29 |

== Certifications ==
Certifications for Hurry Up, We're Dreaming
| Region | Certification | Certified units/sales |
|---|---|---|
| Denmark (IFPI Danmark) | Gold | 10,000^{‡} |
| France (SNEP) | Gold | 50,000^{*} |
| Italy (FIMI) | Gold | 25,000^{‡} |
| United Kingdom (BPI) | Gold | 100,000^{‡} |
Summaries
| Europe (IMPALA) | Diamond | 200,000 |
^{*} Sales figures based on certification alone.^{‡} Sales+streaming figures based on certification alone.
