= Midnight City =

Single by M83

from the album Hurry Up, We're Dreaming
- Released: 16 August 2011
- Recorded: 2010–2011
- Studio: Creekside River Studios
- Genre: Synth-pop; dream pop; new wave; electropop
- Length: 4:03
- Label: Naïve; Mute
- Songwriters: Anthony Gonzalez; Yann Gonzalez; Morgan Kibby; Justin Meldal-Johnsen
- Producers: Anthony Gonzalez; Justin Meldal-Johnsen

M83 singles chronology
"Black Hole" (2010)	"Midnight City" (2011)	"Reunion" (2012)

Music video
- "Midnight City" (Official) on Vimeo

"Midnight City" is a song by French electronic music band M83. It was first released in France on 16 August 2011, as the lead single from the group's sixth studio album, Hurry Up, We're Dreaming (2011). The song was written by Anthony Gonzalez, Yann Gonzalez, Morgan Kibby and Justin Meldal-Johnsen.

The track was number eight in the band's home country of France, and charted on Billboard Alternative Songs and Rock Songs charts. Due to French network TF1's use of the song as the closing theme after the UEFA Euro 2012 football matches, the song topped the digital French chart. Elsewhere, "Midnight City" rose to acclaim in the United Kingdom in 2012, following its selection as the theme to reality TV show Made in Chelsea and prominent usage for the BBC's London 2012 Olympic Games coverage; it peaked at number thirty-four on the UK Singles Chart.

== Recording and release ==
"Midnight City"
The opening "riffs" that are repeated throughout the song are created by distorting singer Anthony Gonzalez's voice

Gonzalez's observations of Downtown Los Angeles at night helped inspire "Midnight City"'s lyrics. Gonzalez created the song's opening riffs by heavily distorting his own voice. The song ends on a saxophone solo played by Fitz and the Tantrums' James King. Regarding the solo, Gonzalez said: "Sometimes a song needs an element to be finished. You know that this element has been overused in the past and is considered clichéd or cheesy, but the song needs it."

Going with Hurry Up, We're Dreaming's theme of childhood, the artwork for the "Midnight City" single was meant to reflect the fascination a kid experiences while watching a fantasy, mystery, or science fiction film. Gonzalez described the single's cover as "a crazy looking alien, a sort of mix of owls and E.T. and science fiction and fantasy movies like The Neverending Story."

The song premiered online on 19 July 2011 as an MP3 download, and was officially released on 16 August 2011.

== Composition ==
M83's vocal range spans from B_{3} to the high note of F♯_{5}.

== Critical reception ==
"Midnight City" received universal acclaim, and was hailed as one of the best songs of 2011. Pitchfork Media's Brandon Stosuy wrote: "'Midnight City' comes off like Gonzalez's '1979.' The parallels are there, from the instantly memorable riff to the gentle sense of longing". Ryan Reed of PopMatters also praised the song, writing: "On this transcendent standout [...] Anthony Gonzalez and co-synth-scientist Justin Meldal-Johnsen build layer upon layer of keys, arena-sized drums, and vocal atmospherics (not mentioning one of the tastiest sax solos this side of a Springsteen record). The result? The synth Sistine Chapel." Josh Jackson of Paste wrote that the song "[...] sees Anthony Gonzalez at his spacey, dramatic best," while Spin's Charles Aaron described the song as "[...] Korg synths set to 'stunned.'"

The track was ranked fifth on Triple J's Hottest 100 for 2011.

=== Accolades ===
Publication	Country	Accolade	Year	Rank
Pitchfork Media	US	Top 100 Tracks of 2011	2011	1
Pitchfork Media	US	The 200 Best Songs of the 2010s	2019	20
Paste	US	50 Best Songs of 2011	2011	9
PopMatters	US	75 Best Songs of 2011	2011	1
Spin	US	20 Best Songs of 2011	2011	12
Triple J	Australia	Triple J Hottest 100, 2011	2011	5
Triple J	Australia	Triple J Hottest 100 of the 2010s	2020	22
The Village Voice	US	Pazz & Jop's critics' poll of 2011	2011	4

== Music video ==
A music video for "Midnight City", directed by Fleur & Manu, was released on 17 October 2011. The video features telekinetic children who escape a federal facility and test their powers in an abandoned factory. The video is the first part of a trilogy which continues in the video for "Reunion" and is concluded in the video for "Wait".

According to M83, the video is a tribute to Akira, Village of the Damned, and Close Encounters of the Third Kind.

The orphanage from which the children escape was filmed at the Orphelinat Saint-Philippe in Meudon.

The warehouse where they try their power is the former Babcock & Wilcox industrial site in La Courneuve, near Paris.

The final scene where the children hold hands together as they watch the sun sets was shot on a rooftop of the "Indy bowling Paris La chapelle" in Porte de la Chapelle, in Paris.

The city in the full-view buildings footage is the Financial District from Los Angeles.

The video has over 560 million views on YouTube as of July 21, 2026.

== Performance and usage in media ==
M83 performed the song live on Late Night with Jimmy Fallon on 21 November 2011. In December 2011, the song was performed live on Last Call with Carson Daly.

"Midnight City" has appeared in several commercials, TV shows, games and movies after its release. The song was featured in a Victoria's Secret commercial, an advertisement for Renault Captur, a Gucci perfume commercial featuring Blake Lively, an advertisement for Ariel 3-in-1 Pods and a video commercial for Polish beer Lech. It served as the theme song to Made in Chelsea, something Gonzalez said was "an opportunity for people to hear my music who'd never listen to it otherwise." It was also featured in the final scene and closing credits of the HBO television series How to Make It in America. In 2020, the song was used in the beginning of the first episode of the Danish-Norwegian television show Ragnarok. The song was used in the feature films Young & Beautiful (2013), Katy Perry: Part of Me (2012) and Warm Bodies (2013). In 2013 the song was used in the first-season finale of The Mindy Project.

The song was also used in several sports broadcasts. On 21 December 2011, "Midnight City" was used in the final moments of the second episode of HBO's television series, 24/7 Flyers-Rangers: The Road to the Winter Classic. The BBC used "Midnight City" as the theme music to their trail for the BBC coverage of the London 2012 Olympic Games. The trail was first broadcast just after midnight on the morning of 1 January 2012. ESPN used the song in its trailer for the second season of 30 for 30. In its home country, the song was used by French network TF1 as the closing theme following the UEFA Euro 2012 football matches, which helped the song to top the digital chart.

In 2012, the song was used as the soundtrack for a campaign video of Julien Rochedy, the President of the youth electoral support committee of Front National. Gonzalez objected to the song's usage in the video, writing in a Facebook post that the Front National did not ask permission from him for use, and that M83 did not associate with any political parties.

On May 10, 2012, Pitbull's artist Jamie Drastik released the official video for his song titled "Sun Comes Up" which heavily samples M83's "Midnight City". The song serves as the second track to Jamie's mixtape September.

In 2013, the song was featured in GT Racing 2.

In 2014, the song is played on the in game radio Non Stop Pop FM in the Sony PlayStation 4, Microsoft Xbox One and PC update of Grand Theft Auto V, mistakenly associated with the ending scene of GTA V.

The song was also featured in 2014 film 22 Jump Street. The song has been streamed over 1.5 billion times on Spotify as of July 2026.

In 2024, the song was used during the final scene and credits of the For All Mankind season 4 finale.

In 2024, the song was used in Illumination's animated short film "Midnight Mission".

In 2024, the beginning of the song was used during the opening of the Olympic Games Paris 2024 and was used in its entirety as the athletes walked into the Stade de France for the closing ceremony.

The song was found in the files of the beta build of the 2012 video game Forza Horizon, but it was removed from the final version of the game.

== Track listing ==
No.	Title	Length
1.	"Midnight City"	4:04
2.	"Midnight City"	4:01

=== Remix EP ===
On 27 September 2011, M83 released a remix EP in advance of the album. The following tracks were on the EP:

No.	Title	Length
1.	"Midnight City"	4:05
2.	"Midnight City" (Man Without Country Remix)	4:13
3.	"Midnight City" (Team Ghost Remix)	3:58
4.	"Midnight City" (Trentemøller Remix)	7:29
5.	"Midnight City" (Big Black Delta Remix)	3:41

== Charts ==
=== Weekly charts ===
Weekly chart performance for "Midnight City"
Chart (2011–2014)	Peak position
Australia (ARIA)	37
Belgium (Ultratop 50 Flanders)	32
Belgium Dance (Ultratop Flanders)	1
Belgium (Ultratop 50 Wallonia)	18
Belgium Dance (Ultratop Wallonia)	1
Canada Rock (Billboard)	1
France (SNEP)	8
Scottish Singles Sales (Official Charts)	30
Switzerland (Schweizer Hitparade)	66
UK Singles (Official Charts)	34
UK Indie (Official Charts)	2
US Billboard Hot 100	72
US Dance Club Songs (Billboard)	19
US Hot Rock & Alternative Songs (Billboard)	7

=== Year-end charts ===
2012 year-end chart rankings for "Midnight City"
Chart (2012)	Position
Belgium Dance (Ultratop Flanders)	76
Belgium (Ultratop Wallonia)	41
Belgium Dance (Ultratop Wallonia)	48
France (SNEP)	40
UK Singles (Official Charts Company)	163
US Hot Rock Songs (Billboard)	12
US On-Demand Songs (Billboard)	14

== Certifications ==
Region	Certification	Certified units/sales
Australia (ARIA)	2× Platinum	140,000^{‡}
Denmark (IFPI Danmark)	Platinum	90,000^{‡}
France (SNEP)	Gold	66,666^{‡}
Italy (FIMI)	Platinum	50,000^{‡}
New Zealand (RMNZ)	3× Platinum	90,000^{‡}
Spain (Promusicae)	Platinum	60,000^{‡}
United Kingdom (BPI)	2× Platinum	1,200,000^{‡}
United States (RIAA)	Platinum	1,000,000
^{‡} Sales+streaming figures based on certification alone.
