= M83 discography =

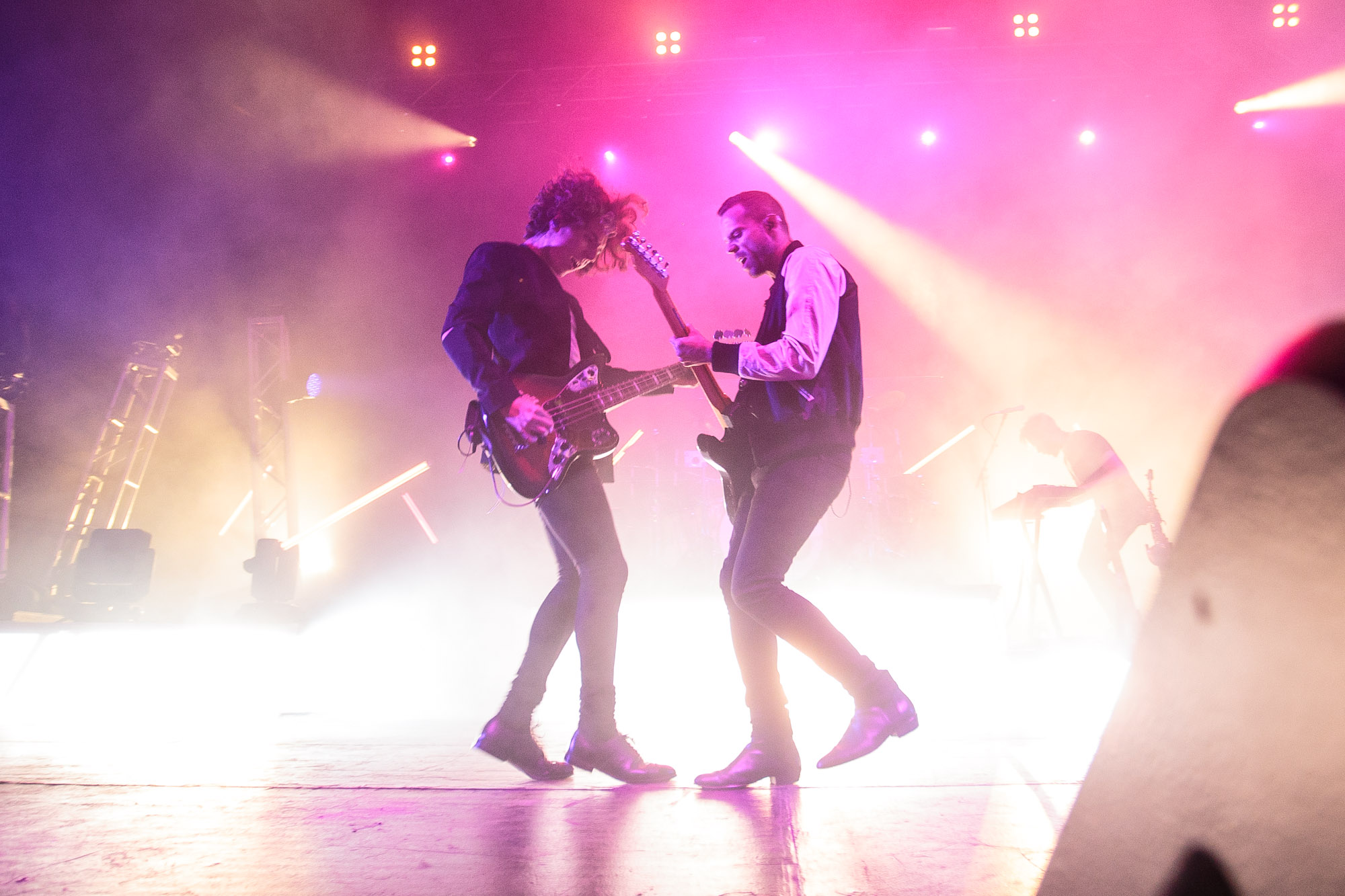
- M83 at Boston's Blue Hills Bank Pavilion 2016
- Studio albums: 10
- Singles: 30

The discography of French electronic music project M83. It consists of ten studio albums and thirty-four singles. Their debut studio album, M83, was released in April 2001. Their second studio album, Dead Cities, Red Seas & Lost Ghosts, was released in April 2003. The album peaked at number 116 on the French Albums Chart. Their third studio album, Before the Dawn Heals Us, was released in January 2005. The album peaked at number 103 on the French Albums Chart. Their fourth studio album, Digital Shades Vol. 1, was released in September 2007. Their fifth studio album, Saturdays = Youth, was released in April 2008. The album peaked at number 173 on the French Albums Chart. Their sixth studio album, Hurry Up, We're Dreaming, was released in October 2011. The album peaked at number 38 on the French Albums Chart. Their seventh studio album, Junk, was released in April 2016. The album peaked at number 26 on the French Albums Chart. Their eighth studio album, DSVII, was released in September 2019. The album peaked at number 98 on the French Albums Chart. The group released their ninth studio album, Fantasy, on 17 March 2023. In July 2026, the group announced their tenth studio album I Wrote You a Letter, set for release on 25 September 2026.

== Albums ==
=== Studio albums ===
List of albums, with selected chart positions
| Title | Details | Peak chart positions | | | | | | | | | | Sales | Certifications |
| Title | Details | FRA | AUS | BEL (FL) | BEL (WA) | CAN | IRL | NOR | SWI | UK | US | Sales | Certifications |
|---|---|---|---|---|---|---|---|---|---|---|---|---|---|
| M83 | Released: 18 April 2001; Label: Gooom, Mute; Formats: CD, download | — | — | — | — | — | — | — | — | — | — | | |
| Dead Cities, Red Seas & Lost Ghosts | Released: 14 April 2003; Label: Gooom, Mute; Formats: CD, download | 116 | — | — | — | — | — | — | — | — | — | | |
| Before the Dawn Heals Us | Released: 24 January 2005; Label: Gooom, Mute; Formats: CD, download | 103 | — | — | — | — | — | — | — | 166 | — (Note: Before the Dawn Heals Us did not enter the US Billboard 200, but peaked at number 18 on the US Heatseekers Albums Chart.) | | |
| Digital Shades Vol. 1 | Released: 3 September 2007; Label: Mute; Formats: CD, LP, download | — | — | — | — | — | — | — | — | — | — | | |
| Saturdays = Youth | Released: 11 April 2008; Label: Mute; Formats: CD, download | 173 | — | — | — | — | — | — | — | — | 107 | | |
| Hurry Up, We're Dreaming | Released: 18 October 2011; Label: Mute; Formats: CD, LP, download | 38 | 37 | 30 | 36 | 37 | 53 | 18 | 15 | 44 | 15 | US: 300,000 | SNEP: Gold; BPI: Gold |
| Junk | Released: 8 April 2016; Label: Mute; Formats: CD, LP, download | 26 | 12 | 30 | 30 | 46 | 52 | 34 | 30 | 28 | 26 | | |
| DSVII | Released: 20 September 2019; Label: Mute; Formats: CD, LP, download | 98 | — | — | 111 | — | — | — | — | — (Note: DSVII did not enter the UK Albums Chart, but peaked at number 76 on the UK Official Album Downloads Chart.) | — (Note: DSVII did not enter the US Billboard 200, but peaked at number 75 on the US Current Album Sales Chart.) | | |
| Fantasy | Released: 17 March 2023; Label: Mute; Formats: CD, LP, download | 58 | — | 67 | 64 | — | — | — | 40 | — (Note: Fantasy did not enter the UK Albums Chart, but peaked at number nine on the UK Official Album Downloads Chart.) | — | | |
| I Wrote You a Letter | Released: 25 September 2026; Label: Other Suns; Formats: CD, LP | 163 | — | 163 | — | — | — | — | — | — | — | | |
"—" denotes a recording that did not chart or was not released in that territory.

=== Soundtrack albums ===
List of soundtrack albums, with selected chart positions
| Title | Details | Peak chart positions | | |
| Title | Details | FRA | BEL | UK |
|---|---|---|---|---|
| Black Heaven (L'autre monde) (with Emmanuel d'Orlando) | Released: 5 July 2010; Label: Naive; Formats: Digital download | — | — | — |
| Oblivion: Original Motion Picture Soundtrack | Released: 8 April 2013; Label: Back Lot; Formats: CD, download, LP | 178 | 133 | 130 |
| You and the Night | Released: 19 November 2013; Label: Mute; Formats: CD, download | — | — | — |
| Knife+Heart | Released: 8 March 2019; Label: Mute; Formats: Download, streaming | — | — | — |
| A Necessary Escape | Released: 9 May 2025; Label: Other Suns; Formats: CD, LP, download, streaming | — | — | — |
| Resurrection | Released: 10 December 2025; Label: Other Suns; Formats: Download, streaming | — | — | — |
"—" denotes a recording that did not chart or was not released in that territory.

== Singles ==
List of singles, with selected chart positions and certifications, showing year released and album name
| Title | Year | Peak chart positions | | | | | | | | | | Certifications | Album |
| Title | Year | FRA | AUS | BEL (FL) | BEL (WA) | IRL | SCO | SWI | UK | US | US Rock | Certifications | Album |
|---|---|---|---|---|---|---|---|---|---|---|---|---|---|
| "Slowly" / "Sitting" | 2002 | — | — | — | — | — | — | — | — | — | — | | M83 |
| "Run into Flowers" | 2003 | — | — | — | — | — | — | — | 199 | — | — | | Dead Cities, Red Seas & Lost Ghosts |
| "0078h" | 2003 | — | — | — | — | — | — | — | — | — | — | | Dead Cities, Red Seas & Lost Ghosts |
| "America" | 2004 | — | — | — | — | — | — | — | — | — | — | | Dead Cities, Red Seas & Lost Ghosts |
| "A Guitar and a Heart" / "Safe" | 2004 | — | — | — | — | — | — | — | — | — | — | | Before the Dawn Heals Us |
| "Don't Save Us from the Flames" | 2005 | — | — | — | — | — | — | — | 86 | — | — | | Before the Dawn Heals Us |
| "Teen Angst" | 2005 | — | — | — | — | — | 84 | — | 86 | — | — | | Before the Dawn Heals Us |
| "Couleurs" | 2008 | — | — | — | — | — | — | — | — | — | — | | Saturdays = Youth |
| "Graveyard Girl" | 2008 | — | — | — | — | — | — | — | — | — | — | | Saturdays = Youth |
| "Kim & Jessie" | 2008 | — | — | — | — | — | — | — | — | — | — | | Saturdays = Youth |
| "We Own the Sky" | 2008 | — | — | — | — | — | — | — | — | — | — | | Saturdays = Youth |
| "Black Hole" | 2010 | — | — | — | — | — | — | — | — | — | — | | Black Heaven |
| "Midnight City" | 2011 | 8 | 37 | 32 | 18 | 61 | 30 | 66 | 34 | 72 | 7 | SNEP: Gold; ARIA: 2× Platinum; BPI: 2× Platinum; RIAA: Platinum | Hurry Up, We're Dreaming |
| "Reunion" | 2012 | — | — | — | — (Note: "Reunion" did not register on the Wallonie Ultratop Singles Chart, but peaked at 34 on the Ultratip Singles chart.) | — | — | — | — | — | 40 | | Hurry Up, We're Dreaming |
| "Mirror" | 2012 | — | — | — | — | — | — | — | — (Note: "Mirror" did not enter the UK Singles Chart, but peaked at number 51 on the UK Physical Singles Chart.) | — | — | | Hurry Up, We're Dreaming |
| "OK Pal" | 2012 | — | — | — | — | — | — | — | — | — | — | | Hurry Up, We're Dreaming |
| "Steve McQueen" | 2012 | — | — | — | — | — | — | — | — | — | — | | Hurry Up, We're Dreaming |
| "Wait" | 2012 | 154 | — | — | — | — | — | — | — | — | — | BPI: Silver | Hurry Up, We're Dreaming |
| "Oblivion" (featuring Susanne Sundfør) | 2013 | 114 | — | — | — | — | — | — | — | — | — | | Oblivion |
| "Do It, Try It" | 2016 | 87 | — | — (Note: "Do It, Try It" did not register on the Flanders Ultratop Singles Chart, but entered the Ultratip Singles chart as an "extra tip".) | — (Note: "Do It, Try It" did not register on the Wallonie Ultratop Singles Chart, but entered the Ultratip Singles chart as an "extra tip".) | — | — | — | — | — | 28 | | Junk |
| "Solitude" | 2016 | 108 | — | — | — | — | — | — | — | — | — | | Junk |
| "Go!" (featuring Mai Lan) | 2016 | 124 | — | — (Note: "Go!" did not register on the Flanders Ultratop Singles Chart, but entered the Ultratip Singles chart as an "extra tip".) | — | — | — | — | — (Note: "Go!" did not enter the UK Singles Chart, but peaked at number 76 on the UK Physical Singles Chart.) | — | 37 | | Junk |
| "Temple of Sorrow" | 2019 | — | — | — | — | — | — | — | — | — | — | | DSVII |
| "Lune de fiel" | 2019 | — | — | — | — | — | — | — | — | — | — | | DSVII |
| "Oceans Niagara" | 2023 | — | — | — | — | — | — | — | — | — | — | | Fantasy |
| "Mirror" | 2023 | — | — | — | — | — | — | — | — | — | — | | Non-album single |
| "Fantasy" | 2024 | — | — | — | — | — | — | — | — | — | — | | Fantasy |
| "Earth to Sea" | 2024 | — | — | — | — | — | — | — | — | — | — | | Fantasy |
| "A Necessary Escape (Part 2)" | 2025 | — | — | — | — | — | — | — | — | — | — | | A Necessary Escape |
| "Blister Sunrise" | 2026 | — | — | — | — | — | — | — | — | — | — | | I Wrote You A Letter |
"—" denotes a recording that did not chart or was not released in that territory.

== Other charted songs ==
| Title | Year | Peak chart positions | | | | | Certifications | Album |
| Title | Year | FRA | SCO | UK | US Alt. DL | US Rock | Certifications | Album |
|---|---|---|---|---|---|---|---|---|
| "I Need You" | 2014 | — | — | — | 23 | 36 | | Divergent: Original Motion Picture Soundtrack |
| "Outro" | 2015 | 48 | 82 | 120 | — | — | BPI: Gold | Hurry Up, We're Dreaming |
"—" denotes a recording that did not chart or was not released in that territory.

== Remixes ==
| Year | Artist | Title |
|---|---|---|
| 2000 | Steve & Rob | "Wallis & Futuna" (M83 Remix) |
| 2003 | Kids Indestructible | "Trans-Pennine Express" (Remixed by M83) |
| 2004 | Goldfrapp | "Black Cherry" (M83 Remix) |
| 2004 | Abstrackt Keal Agram | "Jason Lytle" (M83 Version) |
| 2004 | The Bumblebeez | "Vila Attack" (Remixed By M83) |
| 2004 | Placebo | "Protège-moi" (M83 Remix) |
| 2005 | Bloc Party | "The Pioneers" (M83 Remix) |
| 2005 | KG | "S.P.E.C.T.R.E.02" (Computer Pink Mix By M83) |
| 2006 | Depeche Mode | "Suffer Well" (M83 Remix) |
| 2006 | Telex | "How Do You Dance?" (M83 Remix) |
| 2007 | Fortune | "Mission" (M83 Remix) |
| 2008 | Midnight Juggernauts | "Shadows" (M83 Remix) |
| 2008 | Maps | "To The Sky" (M83 Remix) |
| 2008 | Fires of Rome | "Set In Stone" (M83 Remix) |
| 2009 | White Lies | "Nothing To Give" (M83 Remix) |
| 2010 | Deftones | "Rocket Skates" (M83 Remix) |
| 2011 | Daft Punk | "Fall" (Remixed By M83 vs. Big Black Delta) |
