= Fantasy (M83 album) =

Studio album by M83
- Released: 17 March 2023
- Genre: Shoegaze
- Length: 66:16
- Labels: Other Suns; Virgin Records France (Europe); Mute (America)
- Producers: Anthony Gonzalez; Justin Meldal-Johnsen

M83 chronology
DSVII (2019)	Fantasy (2023)	I Wrote You a Letter (2026)

Singles from Fantasy
- 1. "Oceans Niagara" Released: 10 January 2023; 2. "Fantasy" Released: 22 March 2024; 3. "Earth to Sea" Released: 26 April 2024

Fantasy is the ninth studio album by French band M83, released on 17 March 2023 through Virgin Records France and Mute Records. It was announced on 10 January 2023 alongside the release of the lead single "Oceans Niagara". The band toured North America and Europe in support of the album from April to August 2023.

== Background and recording ==
Gonzalez worked on the album throughout 2021 with longtime bandmate Joe Berry and producer Justin Meldal-Johnsen, explaining that he wanted a "band feel" and to "make music in a room with musicians and jam around and see what happened", which made "enough material to turn all these jams into an album". Gonzalez further called the album "a gift to [him]self" made "without the pressure of selling records" as he rejected commerciality after the success of Hurry Up, We're Dreaming (2011), which he described as "almost too much" for him. This is reflected on the cover of the album, which depicts a multi-eyed monster. Gonzalez described the monster as "scary", but a "very good monster" and was intended to reflect how he viewed the music industry for lacking "craftsmanship". The album also focuses on "the interplay of guitars and synths", which Gonzalez felt is "closer to the energy" of the band's previous work, particularly Before the Dawn Heals Us (2005).

== Release ==
Fantasy was first teased on 29 December 2022 in an 11-second title-less video in 9:16 proportion, uploaded to all of M83's social media accounts, featuring scenes from the music video of the lead single "Oceans Niagara" with "Water Deep" playing in the background. Several days later on 3 January 2023, another 11-second video in 9:16 proportion (this time with a YouTube variation in 16:9), with more scenes from the "Oceans Niagara" music video, was published with the caption "01.10.2023." The single was released with an album and tour announcement on 10 January 2023.

The first six songs on the album were released as an EP called Fantasy – Chapter 1 on 9 February 2023, alongside the announcement of European tour dates.

== Critical reception ==
Professional ratings
Aggregate scores
Source	Rating
Metacritic	74/100
Review scores
Source	Rating
AllMusic	3.5/5 stars
DIY	3/5 stars
Exclaim!	7/10
The Line of Best Fit	6/10
NME	3/5 stars
Pitchfork	6.6/10
PopMatters	4.5/5 stars
Slant Magazine	3.5/5 stars
Sputnikmusic	3.5/5
Under the Radar	8/10 stars

On Metacritic, Fantasy received a score of 74 out of 100 based on 13 critics' reviews, indicating "generally favorable" reception. Tom Breihan of Stereogum felt that genre labels like shoegaze and synthpop did not "cut it" to describe Gonzalez's music and Fantasy, which he felt "deserves a better genre name than any of the ones we currently have in circulation". Breihan pointed out that while "A lot of the songs are seven or eight minutes long", they are "never formless. Instead, those tracks are where Gonzalez takes his time, building up to more moments of tidal, overwhelming bliss."

Will Richards of NME commented that while Gonzalez may have shunned commercialism, his songs "remain sugary, dreamlike and entirely welcoming", describing the album as a "huge, fizzing world of sound that's designed to feel as awe-inspiring as possible". Reviewing the album for Pitchfork, Patrick Lyons characterised Fantasy as "a course correction after Junk's more playful vibe, but it's also a slight reclamation of that album's bright, garish elements", finding that its "music offers a much more legible roadmap for understanding where M83 are today, 20-plus years into their lifespan".

Heather Phares of AllMusic opined that the album "capture[s] what makes [Gonzalez's] music tick: an unabashed, maximalist love of spinning dreams" whose "reveries reveal he hasn't lost any of his talent for crafting massive sound worlds". Ben Hogwood of PopMatters wrote that on Fantasy "we bear witness to a musical talent capable of shifting a listener's ears and heart with a single change of chord, a skill brought to bear most effectively in the climax of Earth To Sea". Kate Crudgington of The Line of Best Fit stated that while a "sweet escape from the overwhelming world that inspired it", Fantasy is "one that listeners will drift in and out of, but it retains the exhilarating signature sound" the band are known for.

Fred Barrett, writing for Slant Magazine, found that M83's sound "has lost some of its novelty" and noted "something that's conspicuously absent here are the instantly gratifying pop hooks of past M83 tracks like 2008's 'Kim & Jessie'", with Gonzalez now letting the lengthier songs "slowly unravel". Exclaim!'s Luke Pearson called it a "welcome and largely satisfying album from Gonzalez and company, even if it's mostly a return to business as usual". Sputnikmusic staff writer YoYoMancuso concluded that Gonzalez "unfortunately continues to struggle with cohesion and distilling his musical ideas down to their most valuable elements, but his latest full-length is an undeniable improvement over his mid-late 2010s output". Louisa Dixon of DIY likened the album to a soundtrack, expounding that "soundtracks are also often intended to feature in the background, and ultimately Fantasy too easily fades into it".

== Tour ==
At the same time that the album was announced and the first single was released, on the occasion of promoting their new album, a tour of North America was announced. The tour began on 10 April 2023 in Phoenix, Arizona, and concluded on 20 May 2023 in Guadalajara, Mexico, before moving to Europe from June to August 2023.

== Track listing ==
Fantasy track listing
No.	Title	Writer(s)	Length
1.	"Water Deep"	Anthony Gonzalez; Joe Berry; Justin Meldal-Johnsen	3:11
2.	"Oceans Niagara"	A. Gonzalez; Berry; Yann Gonzalez; Loïc Maurin; Meldal-Johnsen	4:31
3.	"Amnesia"	A. Gonzalez; Berry; Kaela Sinclair; Kristina Esfandiari; Meldal-Johnsen	4:03
4.	"Us and the Rest"	A. Gonzalez	5:31
5.	"Earth to Sea"	A. Gonzalez; Berry; Sinclair; Meldal-Johnsen	6:40
6.	"Radar, Far, Gone"	A. Gonzalez	4:05
7.	"Deceiver"	A. Gonzalez; Berry; Y. Gonzalez; Meldal-Johnsen	6:29
8.	"Fantasy"	A. Gonzalez; Berry; Meldal-Johnsen	4:34
9.	"Laura"	A. Gonzalez; Berry; Esfandiari; Meldal-Johnsen	4:08
10.	"Sunny Boy"	A. Gonzalez; Berry; Y. Gonzalez; Sinclair; Meldal-Johnsen	6:04
11.	"Kool Nuit" (featuring Kaela)	A. Gonzalez; Berry; Y. Gonzalez; Sinclair; Meldal-Johnsen	7:56
12.	"Sunny Boy Part 2"	A. Gonzalez; Berry; Meldal-Johnsen	1:59
13.	"Dismemberment Bureau"	A. Gonzalez; Berry; Y. Gonzalez; Sinclair; Meldal-Johnsen	7:05
Total length:			66:16

== Personnel ==
- Anthony Gonzalez – acoustic & electric guitars (1, 6), synthesizers (1–13), lead & background vocals (2–11, 13), drum programming (4, 9, 10), sound design (4), piano (4), vocals (12), production, engineering
- Justin Meldal-Johnsen – electric guitars (1–5, 8, 10, 11, 13), four & eight-string bass guitars (1), drum programming (1–4, 8–11, 13), synthesizers (1–11, 13), bass guitar (2–8, 10, 11, 13), percussion (2, 3, 5–11, 13), Fender Bass VI (3–5), six & twelve-string electric guitars (7, 9), fretled & fretless bass guitars (9), production, engineering
- Joe Berry – synthesizers (1–13), The Pipe (1, 13), background vocals (2, 6, 9, 10), piano (4, 6, 8, 9, 13), percussion (7–9), saxophone (7, 9–11), EWI (8), flute (11), vocals (12)
- Kaela Sinclair – background vocals (2, 3, 5, 8–12), lead vocals (3, 10, 11)
- Jenda Wight – background vocals (8)
- Josh Freese – drums (2–5, 9, 10)
- Loic Maurin – drums (3, 5, 10)
- Cyrus Reynolds – acoustic guitar (4), synthesizers (4), additional production (4)
- Danny Franker – percussion (5, 7, 8)
- Mark Guilana – drums (7, 8, 11, 13)
- James Chapman – additional synthesizers (8)
- Kristina Esfandiari – lead & background vocals (9), vocals (12)
- Dave Cooley – mastering
- Tony Hoffer – mixing
- Mike Schuppan – engineering
- Nick Spezia – orchestral engineering
- Carlos de la Garza – additional engineering
- Francois Bonnet – additional engineering
- Geoff Neal – engineering assistance
- Russell Scarborough – engineering assistance
- Alan Umstead – concertmaster, contractor
- Peter Rotter – contractor
- David Shipps – conductor

== Charts ==
Chart performance for Fantasy
Chart (2023)	Peak position
Belgian Albums (Ultratop Flanders)	67
Belgian Albums (Ultratop Wallonia)	64
French Albums (SNEP)	58
German Albums (Offizielle Top 100)	59
Scottish Albums (Official Charts)	14
Swiss Albums (Schweizer Hitparade)	40
UK Album Downloads (Official Charts)	9
US Independent Albums (Billboard)	47
US Top Album Sales (Billboard)	16
