= Lower Your Eyelids to Die with the Sun =

Song by M83

from the album Before the Dawn Heals Us
- Released: 2005
- Genre: Ambient, post-rock
- Length: 10:41
- Label: Gooom
- Songwriter(s): Anthony Gonzalez
- Producer(s): Anthony Gonzalez; Antoine Gaillet; Jean-Philippe Talaga

"Lower Your Eyelids to Die with the Sun" is a song by French electronic music artist M83, which serves as the final track of the band's third album, Before the Dawn Heals Us (2005). It is a 10-minute ambient post-rock instrumental characterized by monolithic arrangements of choral singers and spacious drums. The song has been used in several films and trailers due to its dramatic nature, and has also received critical acclaim, with Slant Magazine even ranking it the best song M83 has released, stating that it "remains the first instance where the band achieved something truly mythical." A previously unreleased music video was shared by frontman Anthony Gonzalez in anticipation of Mute Records re-releasing M83's first three studio albums.

== Music video ==
The video for "Lower Your Eyelids to Die with the Sun", directed by Yoonha Park, was released manually by Gonzalez himself via M83's YouTube channel on 21 August 2014. The video, which cut the song down to 8 minutes, features spliced footage of crash test dummies in use interspersed with a man and a woman, as well as their personal belongings (a purse, a pill bottle, a coffee mug, a makeup brush, etc.), being thrown from their cars in slow-motion with the glass from their windows as well as their belongings cascading around them. The video closes with their death and ascends into computer-generated nebulae. The video is in keeping with the album-wide theme of car crashes, as seen on the songs "Don't Save Us from the Flames" and "Car Chase Terror". The video was praised, with Pitchfork calling it "all very cinematic and beautiful", as well as Stereogum saying that it is "as majestic and somber as the song itself".

== Appearances ==
- The film Now Is Good (2012)
- Britney Spears documentary Britney: For the Record (2008)
- Trailer for the film A Monster Calls (2016)
- British horror film Donkey Punch (2008)
- The bid video of Los Angeles to host the 2028 Summer Olympics
- Intro to Lakai skateboarding video Fully Flared (2007)
- Season 1, Episode 8 of Nirvanna the Band the Show
- Season 1, Episode 3 of Fate: The Winx Saga last scene/end credits (2021)
