= M83 =

M83 or M-83 may refer to:

== Astronomy ==
- Messier 83, a spiral galaxy in the constellation Hydra
  - M83 Group, a group of galaxies centered around Messier 83

== Military ==
- M-83, a Soviet M-class submarine
- M83 smoke grenade
- M83 submunition, a US copy of the German Butterfly Bomb of World War II; used in the M29 cluster bomb

== Music ==
- M83 (band), an electronic band named after the galaxy of the same name
  - M83 (album), the debut album of the M83 music group

== Roads and routes ==
- M-83 (Michigan highway), a state highway in Michigan
