= Sarah Jones (artist) =

British photographer

Sarah Jones (born 1959) is a British visual artist working primarily in photography. Her practice is rooted in art history, and she draws influence from topics such as psychoanalysis, adolescence, and the Victorian period. She gained international recognition in the mid 1990s coinciding with the completion of her MA in Fine Art at Goldsmiths College in London in 1996.

She has had solo exhibitions at Museum Folkwang, Essen; Museo Nacional Centro de Arte Reina Sofía, Madrid; Le Consortium, Dijon; Huis Marseille, Museum for Photography, Amsterdam. Her work is represented in public collections nationally and internationally.

== Life and work ==
Jones' career gained recognition after the completion of her MA at Goldsmiths College in 1996. She went on to be involved in many notable exhibitions, including the 3rd International Tokyo Photo Bienalle, presented at the Tokyo Metropolitan Museum of Photography and Another Girl, Another Planet curated by Gregory Crewdson and involving 12 other contemporary photographers.

=== Another Girl, Another Planet ===
Jones was also involved in the 1999 show Another Girl, Another Planet along with 9 other female artists, curated by Crewdson and Jeanne Greenberg Rohatyn at the Van Doren Gallery in New York City. Other artists involved in the show included Anna Gaskell, Katy Grannan, Malerie Marder, Justine Kurland. The show consisted primarily of topics surrounding adolescence and womanhood. The show had mixed reviews, many critics, such as Katy Seigel, criticized the pornographic and sexualized elements in the show, referring in particular to photos of adolescent girls. Seigel went on to publish an article about the photographers involved in the show titling it "Dial P for Panties: Narrative Photography in the 1990s" and delivered some harsh reviews labelling the group of female artists the "Panty Photographers".

Another review from The New York Times, published in 1999, describes the show as dreamy and erotically charged, "Justine Kurland's wide-screen color pictures of gangs of unsupervised girls at play in the woods, Katy Grannan's portraits of teen-agers posed in their underwear in their bedrooms, Sarah Jones' big Pre-Raphaelite-esque image of pensive twins in a backyard garden or Malerie Marder's vision of a girl in a bikini floating on a pool raft, you feel the mood of dreamy, erotically charged vagrancy by which the photographers themselves seem to be so fruitfully possessed."

== Influences ==
Jones enjoys photography for its capability to scrutinize something, freezing a moment to look more closely at it. "Perhaps photography allows us to daydream; reverie is where time seems to stretch out." Jones states in an interview with A.M. Homes for Frieze magazine. She is also influenced by psychoanalysis and the theories of Sigmund Freud, Jacques Lacan, and other well known psychological theorists. These ideas of psychoanalysis were explored in her series of photos of psychoanalyst couches. She wanted to explore the spaces that allowed for people to re-live experiences and loosen the grip that their past has on them. Through talking with the head of the British Institute of Psychoanalysis, she learned that patients often acted as if there were a third party in the session. This was interesting to her in the sense of the camera being the third presence, creating the idea of an audience.

Jones' images are narrative in nature, and she is interested in how a narrative is constructed. She also believes that photography leaves a space for the viewer to bring a unique narrative and experience to an image. She develops her narratives using various visual codes that allude to the many different references that she makes throughout her work. Some of these codes include her use of reference to art history, and her fetishization of hair. Her photograph "Horse(profile)(black)(I)" from 2010 has been referenced to Eadweard Muybridge's black horse, and her photographs of roses are said to be compared to Karl Blossfeldt's botanical studies.

Her art historical references are apparent in her choice of colors. She has a strong presence of blue, to indicate the sublime, or distance in Renaissance painting. As well as strong notes of red in her photos such as in "Living Room (Curtain)(I)]". Her Flower series is heavily influenced by the gothic era, pulling inspiration from the aesthetics of that time to create 'Victorian rose gardens' and rich mysterious colors and darkness.

She is also influenced by the Victorian cultural obsession with photographing hair, and how hair can act as an allegory to location and figure, or in her words hair can represent "nature gone slightly mad". Hair reminds her of the roses she photographs, "visceral, spindly and beautiful, in bloom but slightly diseased".

== Solo exhibitions ==
Date	Exhibitions
2013	Minneapolis Institute of Art, Minneapolis, USA
2007	Sarah Jones: Photographs, National Science and Media Museum, Bradford, UK
2000	Le Consortium, Dijon, (as part of I Love Dijon), France (C) Huis Marseille, Museum for Photography, Amsterdam, the Netherlands
1999	Museum Folkwang, Essen, Germany (C) Centre for Photography, University of Salamanca, Spain Museo Nacional Centro de Arte Reina Sofía, Madrid, Spain Jerwood Space, London
1998	École des Beaux-Arts, Tours, France
1997	Le Consortium, Dijon, France
1995	(Office Départemental de Développement Culturel, Mission Arts Plastiques)

== Collections ==
Jones' work is held in the following permanent collections:

- Arts Council Collection, London
- Goetz Collection, Germany
- Government Art Collection, UK
- Huis Marseille, Museum for Photography, Amsterdam, the Netherlands
- San Francisco Museum of Modern Art, San Francisco, USA
- Science Museum Group, UK
- Tate, London
- Victoria and Albert Museum, London
