= Dead Cities, Red Seas & Lost Ghosts =

Studio album by M83
- Released: 14 April 2003
- Recorded: 2002
- Studio: M83 Studio
- Genres: Indie electronic; ambient; shoegaze; post-rock
- Length: 56:51
- Label: Gooom
- Producers: Anthony Gonzalez; Nicolas Fromageau; Nicolas Barlet; Morgan Daguenet

M83 chronology
M83 (2001)	Dead Cities, Red Seas & Lost Ghosts (2003)	Before the Dawn Heals Us (2005)

Singles from Dead Cities, Red Seas & Lost Ghosts
- 1. "Run into Flowers" Released: 23 June 2003; 2. "0078h" Released: 2 December 2003; 3. "America" Released: 26 April 2004

Dead Cities, Red Seas & Lost Ghosts (stylised without spaces) is the second studio album by the French electronic music group M83. The album was first released in Europe on 14 April 2003, then in North America on 27 July 2004. The cover art is the photograph Snow Angels by Justine Kurland. This album was founding member Nicolas Fromageau's last album with the band.

The North American pressing of the album comes with a bonus disc, containing five additional tracks, including the title track of the album and a live version of "Gone", as well as the enhanced videos of the singles "Run into Flowers" and "America".

== Reception ==
Professional ratings
Aggregate scores
Source	Rating
Metacritic	86/100
Review scores
Source	Rating
AllMusic	4/5 stars
The Austin Chronicle	4/5 stars
Drowned in Sound	9/10
Pitchfork	9.2/10
Playlouder	4.5/5 stars
PopMatters	8/10
Stylus Magazine	A
Uncut	3/5 stars
Under the Radar	8/10
URB	4.5/5 stars

Dead Cities, Red Seas & Lost Ghosts has received widespread critical acclaim. At Metacritic, which assigns a normalised rating out of 100 to reviews from mainstream critics, the album received an average score of 86, based on 15 reviews, which indicates "universal acclaim".

In August 2009, Pitchfork placed Dead Cities, Red Seas & Lost Ghosts at number 188 on their list of the "Top 200 Albums of the 2000s," and, in October 2016, at number 22 on their list of "The 50 Best Shoegaze Albums of All Time." As of 2005 close to 25,000 copies of Dead Cities, Red Seas & Lost Ghosts had been sold in the United States.

== Track listing ==
=== Standard track listing ===
Dead Cities, Red Seas & Lost Ghosts track listing
No.	Title	Writer(s)	Length
1.	"Birds"	Anthony Gonzalez; Nicolas Fromageau	0:53
2.	"Unrecorded"	Gonzalez; Fromageau	4:11
3.	"Run into Flowers"	Gonzalez; Fromageau; Benoît de Villeneuve	4:09
4.	"In Church"	Gonzalez; Fromageau	3:58
5.	"America"	Gonzalez; Fromageau	3:06
6.	"On a White Lake, Near a Green Mountain"	Gonzalez; Fromageau	4:43
7.	"Noise"	Gonzalez; Fromageau	3:54
8.	"Be Wild"	Gonzalez	3:19
9.	"Cyborg"	Gonzalez; Fromageau	3:48
10.	"0078h"	Gonzalez; Fromageau; Morgan Daguenet	4:01
11.	"Gone"	Gonzalez; Fromageau	6:07
12.	"Beauties Can Die" (ends at 9:17; contains a hidden track at 11:17, after a period of silence)	Gonzalez	14:38
Total length:			56:45

Bonus disc
No.	Title	Writer(s)	Length
1.	"Tsubasa"	Gonzalez; Fromageau	4:09
2.	"God of Thunder"	Gonzalez; Fromageau	5:55
3.	"In Church" (Cyann & Ben version)	Gonzalez; Fromageau	7:05
4.	"Gone" (live)	Gonzalez; Fromageau	5:50
5.	"Dead Cities, Red Seas & Lost Ghosts"	Gonzalez; Fromageau	17:42
6.	"Run into Flowers" (enhanced video)		4:08
7.	"America" (enhanced video)		3:06
Total length:			97:26

Notes

- The sampled dialogue in "America" comes from the film Don't Look Now.

=== Vinyl track listing ===
Vinyl issues of this album came with an extra track, a nearly 18-minute long piece named "Dead Cities, Red Seas & Lost Ghosts".

Side A
No.	Title	Writer(s)	Length
1.	"Birds"	Anthony Gonzalez; Nicolas Fromageau	0:53
2.	"Unrecorded"	Gonzalez; Fromageau	4:11
3.	"Run into Flowers"	Gonzalez; Fromageau; Benoît de Villeneuve	4:09
4.	"In Church"	Gonzalez; Fromageau	3:58

Side B
No.	Title	Writer(s)	Length
5.	"Be Wild"	Gonzalez	3:19
6.	"America"	Gonzalez; Fromageau	3:06
7.	"On a White Lake, Near a Green Mountain"	Gonzalez; Fromageau	4:43
8.	"Noise"	Gonzalez; Fromageau	3:54

Side C
No.	Title	Writer(s)	Length
9.	"Cyborg"	Gonzalez; Fromageau	3:48
10.	"0078h"	Gonzalez; Fromageau; Morgan Daguenet	4:01
11.	"Gone"	Gonzalez; Fromageau	6:07
12.	"Beauties Can Die"	Gonzalez	9:20

Side D
No.	Title	Writer(s)	Length
13.	"Dead Cities, Red Seas & Lost Ghosts"	Gonzalez; Fromageau	17:40
Total length:			1:09:09

== Charts ==
Chart performance for Dead Cities, Red Seas & Lost Ghosts
Chart (2003)	Peak position
French Albums (SNEP)	116
