= Blister Sunrise =

Single by M83

from the album I Wrote You a Letter
- Released: 4 September 2026
- Genre: Shoegaze
- Length: 3:20
- Label: Other Suns
- Songwriter: Anthony Gonzalez
- Producers: Gonzalez; Benoît de Villeneuve

M83 singles chronology
"Earth to Sea" (2024)	"Blister Sunrise" (2026)

"Blister Sunrise" is a song by French electronic music band M83 released under lead performer Anthony Gonzalez's own label, Other Suns. The track was first released on 4 September 2026 as the lead single from the group's tenth studio album, I Wrote You a Letter (2026).

== Composition ==
Alongside the duo, live members Joe Berry, Clément Libes, and Kaela Sinclair all feature on the song.

== Reception ==
Consequence of Sound said the song "serves as an exciting first look at what Gonzalez has in store", beginning with a "wash of crashing synths that seem to climb higher and higher up a sonic cliffside as layers of distortion pile on, gradually swelling into a widescreen crescendo". Krinsky also called the song "dreamy and cinematic" with a "rougher shoegaze weight underneath it that eventually gives way to a light, raw piano composition, taking all the time it desires to find its end".
