= Malerie Marder =

American photographer

Malerie Marder received her B.A. in History and Art from Bard College and her M.F.A. from Yale University in New Haven, Connecticut where she was awarded the Schickle-Collingwood Prize and the John Ferguson Weir Award.

Her solo exhibitions include presentations at Leslie Tonkonow Artworks + Projects, Salon 94, and Greenberg Van Doren in New York; Blain|Southern, Maureen Paley Gallery, and The Photographer’s Gallery in London; and No Moon LA in Los Angeles.

Her work has been included in international group exhibitions, among them "Everyday Epiphanies: Photography and Daily Life Since 1969" at The Metropolitan Museum of Art, New York; "Desire" at Gagosian Gallery and Deitch Projects, The Moore Building, Art Basel; "On the Basis of Art: 150 Years of Women" at the Yale University Art Gallery, New Haven, Connecticut; "Nude" at Fotografiska Stockholm, Fotografiska New York, and Fotografiska Berlin; "Shoot the Family", curated by Ralph Rugoff, at ICI, New York; "The Naked Face" at the National Gallery of Victoria, Melbourne; "Borrowed Light: Selections from the Jack Shear Collection" at The Tang Museum, Saratoga Springs; and "Sight/Insight" at the Corcoran Gallery of Art, Washington, D.C.

Her work has been featured in publications including Artforum, Parkett, ArtReview, Art in America, The New Yorker, The New York Times Magazine, Harper’s Bazaar, British Vogue, AnOther, and Purple Magazine, among others.

In 2019, Marder received a grant from the Peter S. Reed Foundation and was named to The New Yorker’s best photography of the year list — an honor repeated in 2020. Her work was also included in Sophie Calle’s Guernica at the Musée Picasso, Paris, October 2023–January 2024. She lives and works in New York.

== Career ==
Her work centers on vivid color and black-and-white nude photographs, and has gained attention in the first decade of the new century because of its disquieting personal, sexual, and psychological aspects. The artist examines human intimacy by photographing friends and family undressed.

In 1999 was included in the exhibition Another Girl, Another Planet alongside twelve other photographers, including Katy Grannan, Justine Kurland, Dana Hoey and Sarah Jones.

Marder's video work, At Rest, was first shown at Salon 94 in New York City. The artist edited videotape shot over two years into nearly 13 minutes of friends and family, naked, in various states of repose: couples asleep in bed, a child resting on a plump pillow, a woman relaxing in the bathtub. Composer Jonathan Bepler produced the soundtrack.

Marder's short film "Romeo" shot on 35 mm Academy 1:66 in Los Angeles debuted at the Firenze FilmCorti Festival at Museum Le Murate in Florence.

== Publications ==
- Carnal Knowledge. Violette Editions, 2011. With text contributions by Charlotte Cotton, Gregory Crewdson, Philip-Lorca diCorcia, James Ellroy, James Frey, AM Homes, and Bruce Wagner.
- Anatomy. Twin Palms Publishers, 2013. Comprising work made in the Netherlands from 2008 to 2013.

== Collections ==
Marder's work is held in the following permanent collections:

- Solomon R. Guggenheim Museum, New York
- Metropolitan Museum of Art, New York
- National Gallery of Victoria, Melbourne, Australia
- National Gallery of Art, Washington, DC.

Her work is held in the permanent collections of The Metropolitan Museum of Art and the Solomon R. Guggenheim Museum, New York; the National Gallery of Art and the Phillips Collection, Washington, D.C.; the National Gallery of Victoria, Melbourne; the Seattle Art Museum, Seattle, Washington; The Tang Museum of Art, Saratoga Springs, New York; The Hessel Museum of Art, Annandale-on-Hudson, New York; the Mint Museum, Charlotte, North Carolina; and the Yale University Art Gallery, New Haven, Connecticut, among others.

1. Battersby, Matilda (8 April 2011). ["Bare Essentials, Malerie Marder"](https://www.independent.co.uk/arts-entertainment/art/features/malerie-marder-carnal-knowledge-2264637.html). *The Independent*. Retrieved 27 March 2018.

2. diCorcia, Philip-Lorca (17 April 2011). ["Malerie Marder: Bare Essentials"](https://web.archive.org/web/20110420222709/http://www.nowness.com/day/2011/4/17/malerie-marder-bare-essentials). *Nowness*. Retrieved 18 April 2011.

3. ["Carnal Knowledge, Malerie Marder"](http://www.blainsouthern.com/exhibitions/2011/malerie-marder-carnal-knowledge-london). *Blain Southern*. 2011. Retrieved 27 March 2018.

4. McDevitt, Siobhan (January 2003). ["1000 Words: Malerie Marder"](https://www.artforum.com/features/1000-words-malerie-marder-165363/). *Artforum*. Vol. 41, no. 5.

5. Wilson-Goldie, Kaelen (February 2014). ["Malerie Marder"](https://www.artforum.com/events/malerie-marder-203622/). *Artforum*. Vol. 52, no. 6.

6. Siegel, Katy (October 1999). ["Openings: Malerie Marder"](https://www.artforum.com/features/openings-malerie-marder-2-162870/). *Artforum*. Vol. 38, no. 2.

7. Honigman, Ana Finel (December 2013). ["Malerie Marder"](https://www.artforum.com/events/leslie-tonkonow-artworks-projects-3-202718/). *Artforum*.

8. Ebony, David (6 November 2013). ["Malerie Marder: Out of Her Comfort Zone"](https://www.artnews.com/art-in-america/interviews/malerie-marder-out-of-her-comfort-zone-56349/). *Art in America*.

9. Finch, Charlie (26 May 2011). ["Malerie Marder"](https://www.artnet.com/magazineus/features/finch/malerie-marder-carnal-knowledge-5-26-11.asp). *Artnet Magazine*.

10. Marder, Malerie; Grotjahn, Mark (2012). ["Holding the Release"](https://static1.squarespace.com/static/5e614fa6565bfc04478be7be/t/5f7f22ab51e6ea3862207c88/1602167470569/Grotjahn+Mark+conversation+Parkett+90.pdf). *Parkett*. No. 90, pp. 6–17.
