= Happy Like an Autumn Tree =

Happy like an autumn tree

Studio album by Cyann & Ben
- Released: 19 October 2004
- Genre: Post-rock; Dream pop
- Label: Gooom Disques

Cyann & Ben chronology
Spring (2004)	Happy like an autumn tree (2004)	Sweet Beliefs (2006)

Professional ratings
Review scores
Source	Rating
Allmusic	link
Pitchfork Media	7.2/10 link

Happy Like An Autumn Tree is the second full-length album by Cyann & Ben. It was released on 19 October 2004 on Gooom Disques.

== Track listing ==
1. "Circle"
2. "(Silences and Little Melodies For...)"
3. "Gone to Waste"
4. "(Close to Discovery)"
5. "A Moment Nowhere"
6. "(Tide)"
7. "Summer"
8. "Obsessing and Screaming Voice in a Shell"
