= Black Heaven (film) =

- Film poster
- Directed by: Gilles Marchand
- Written by: Gilles Marchand; Dominik Moll
- Produced by: Carole Scotta; Caroline Benjo; Simon Arnal-Szlovak; Barbara Letellier; Jacques-Henri Bronckart
- Starring: Louise Bourgoin; Grégoire Leprince-Ringuet; Melvil Poupaud
- Cinematography: Céline Bozon
- Edited by: Nelly Quettier
- Music by: Emmanuel D'Orlando; Anthony Gonzalez
- Distributed by: Haut et Court (France)
- Release dates: 16 May 2010 (Cannes); 14 July 2010 (France); 18 August 2010 (Belgium)
- Running time: 105 minutes
- Countries: France; Belgium
- Language: French
- Budget: $5.8 million
- Box office: $453.349

Black Heaven (original title: L'Autre monde) is a 2010 French drama film directed by Gilles Marchand and starring Grégoire Leprince-Ringuet, Louise Bourgoin, Melvil Poupaud and Pauline Etienne. It tells the story of Gaspard, who is lured by a beautiful girl into an obsessive, deadly video game.

== Plot ==
Gaspard is a young man who leads a visibly carefree life in the South of France. His life changes when his new girlfriend Marion finds a mobile phone in a changing room on the beach. This belongs to a certain Dragon and several messages are addressed to a certain Sam. The last message contains a time and location for a date. Gaspard and his girlfriend also decide to go to the appointment, where they do indeed see both Dragon and Sam show up. Sam turns out to be a beautiful young woman whose real name is Audrey and to which Gaspard is immediately attracted. Instead of returning the cell phone to Dragon, Marion and Gaspard decide to follow Audrey and Dragon instead.

After a visit to a DIY store, both couples end up in a deserted corner at the end of a dirt road. Marion and Gaspard have lost sight of Audrey and Dragon for a moment, and when they find them again, a tragedy appears to have occurred: Dragon and Sam/Audrey have tried to commit suicide using a plastic snake and Dragon's car. Marion and Gaspard make an attempt to save them, but for Dragon, their help comes too late, but Audrey with faint signs of life survives by Marion administering a cycle of rescue breaths on her until the paramedics arrive.

The experience from the incident has scarred Gaspard heavily. He continues to see Marion, but he secretly fantasizes about Audrey. Through another message on Dragon's cell phone, he discovers that both Dragon and Audrey were active on an online computer game called "Black Hole". Sam turns out to be the name of Audrey's avatar in this game. A second chance encounter with Audrey as he finds her and finds a tattoo up to her butt cracks which says "heaven" as gets dressed while naked in a changing room in real life makes Gaspard search for her alter ego in the gaming world. Eventually he finds (thanks to his own avatar Gordon) Sam back in a virtual private club in Black Hole. During the night, she skinny dipping in her house with Gaspard and his two friends following her, getting out of the swimming pool naked and dancing in her robe, After a few dates in the virtual world, 'Sam' (who doesn't know that 'Gordon' is actually Gaspard) and 'Gordon' make a pact: he has to hurt his girlfriend for her, she will spend the night with her savior (Gaspard) in return. After Gaspard fulfills his part of the pact by brutally dropping his girlfriend, he is disappointed by Audrey. Instead of making love to him, she spends the night with his friend Ludo.

When the disillusioned Gaspard returns home, he discovers that Vincent - Audrey's brother - has broken into his home. Vincent tells Gaspard that his sister has long been suicidal. He also discovers that Vincent was spying on them the day Gaspard and Marion were able to save Audrey. Vincent admits his sickly fascination with suicide, and Gaspard suddenly understands that it is Vincent who uses his sister to lure young people into suicide pacts. He tries to contact Sam/Audrey through Black Hole and manages to make a date at the apartment she shares with her brother, not knowing that it was actually Vincent who controlled Sam within Black Hole. When Gaspard arrives at Audrey and Vincent's apartment, he is overpowered by Vincent after a short conversation with Audrey. He cuffs his hands and drags him to the roof of the apartment building, with the intention of pushing him off. Just before he succeeds, Audrey attracts her brother's attention by jumping off the roof herself. Realizing that his sister is dead, Vincent stops trying to kill Gaspard.

The next morning, Marion's father wakes her to help Gaspard who is in trouble. When they arrive at the police station, we see a handcuffed Vincent in custody there. Marion then encounters a bloodied Gaspard, who tells her he was honest when he told her he loved her at the quarry. That also maybe he ruined things between them; he then becomes emotional. Seeing him breaking down, she embraces him, forgiving him for the past.

== Cast ==
- Grégoire Leprince-Ringuet as Gaspard
- Louise Bourgoin as Audrey
- Melvil Poupaud as Vincent
- Pauline Etienne as Marion
- Pierre Niney as Yann
- Ali Marhyar as Ludo
- Patrick Descamps as Marion's father
- Swann Arlaud as Dragon

== Music ==
The music is composed by Emmanuel D'Orlando and M83's Anthony Gonzalez. It also features songs from previous M83 albums.

1. "In the Cold I'm Standing" (Before the Dawn Heals Us)
2. "Farewell / Goodbye" (Before the Dawn Heals Us)
3. "*" (Asterisk) (Before the Dawn Heals Us)
4. "Facing That" (M83)
5. "Violet Tree" (M83)
