= Spring (Cyann & Ben album) =

Studio album by Cyann & Ben
- Released: 17 February 2004
- Genre: Post-rock; Dream pop
- Label: Gooom Disques Last album =

Cyann & Ben chronology
Spring (2004)	Happy Like an Autumn Tree (2004)

Professional ratings
Review scores
Source	Rating
Allmusic	link
Pitchfork Media	8.4/10 link

Spring is the debut full-length album by Cyann & Ben. It was released on 17 February 2004 on Gooom Disquesin France and Locust Music in North America.

== Track listing ==
1. "Buick to the Moon"
2. "I Can't Pretend Anymore"
3. "Selected Ambient Work"
4. "Siren Song"
5. "Behind Her Smiling Eyes"
6. "Melody"
7. "Beyond Reality"
8. "A Dance With the Devil"
9. "Neurotic Hope"
