= Britney: For the Record =

2008 documentary television film

- MTV poster
- Directed by: Phil Griffin
- Starring: Britney Spears; Jamie Spears; Guest appearance: Madonna
- Country of origin: United States
- Original language: English

Production
- Producer: Andrew Fried
- Running time: 60 minutes
- Production company: RadicalMedia

Original release
- Network: MTV
- Release: November 30, 2008

Britney: For the Record is a 2008 documentary television film about American singer Britney Spears, following her return to the recording industry after her much-publicized personal struggles. The film was shot in Beverly Hills and New York City during the third quarter of 2008; main shooting began on September 5, 2008, two days before Spears's appearance at the MTV Video Music Awards. It was directed by Phil Griffin. MTV, one of the two official distributors of the documentary, posted on their website the first promotional trailer on October 9, 2008.

Britney: For the Record premiered on MTV on November 30, 2008 in the United States, two days before the release of her sixth studio album, Circus, for which the documentary served as a promotion tool. It received mixed reviews from critics, but was broadcast with high ratings and received positive reactions from fans.

== Synopsis ==
Britney: For the Record reveals Spears' most intimate moments in the span of 60 days, from the beginning of her much publicized meltdown, until how she returned to the music spotlight. She also reflects on past decisions, saying "I'm a smart person... What the hell was I thinking?!" For the Record includes footage from her appearance at the 2008 MTV Video Music Awards, going into the recording studio, to the video shoots of her singles "Womanizer" and "Circus"—songs off her sixth studio album, Circus—to rehearsals, and press tours. Madonna also makes a special appearance and commentary. Spears talks about past relationships. She explains that going through her first break-up, with boyfriend Justin Timberlake, in the spotlight was no easy task for a teenage girl. She felt that all the publicity made it even more difficult and confusing for her to move on at such a young age and so she began to act out. Her break-up with husband and father of her two sons, Kevin Federline, was even worse she explains. This loss took an even greater toll on her and once again all the paparazzi attention did not help.

"I think I married for the wrong reasons. Instead of following my heart and doing something that made me really happy. I just did it because ... for just the idea of everything."

— Britney Spears

Spears talked about her feelings towards the conservatorship her father contains over her and how she feels about her life, and quotes "There's no excitement, there's no passion... I have really good days, and then I have bad days. Even when you go to jail, you know there's the time when you're gonna get out. But in this situation, it's never ending. It's just like Groundhog Day every day." Spears added "I think it's too in control, If I wasn't under the restraints I'm under, I'd feel so liberated. When I tell them the way I feel, it's like they hear but they're really not listening. I never wanted to become one of those prisoner people. I always wanted to feel free." The singer also commented on her feelings towards fans and her music style. "It's weird because your music is a reflection of what you're going through," she says. "It's such a part of me, the record, 'cause of what I've gone through." In another clip, Spears talks about how she uses her work as a dancer and a singer to deal with the stress of her life and how it helps her deal with her emotions. She said that for her, dancing is like therapy. "If I have a lot of nervous energy, when I start dancing, it all goes away and I just feel emotion. It's like a rollercoaster," she says. "People think that when you go through something in life you have to go to therapy. For me, art is therapy, because it's like you're expressing yourself in such a spiritual way. "Sometimes you don't need to use words to go through what you need to go through," she continues. "Sometimes it's an emotion you need to feel when you dance, that you need to touch. And the only thing that can touch it is when you move a certain way."

== Production ==
=== Development ===
After Spears's cameo appearance on How I Met Your Mother in mid-summer of 2008, The National Enquirer reported that Larry Rudolph, Spears's long-time manager who returned to her management after being dismissed in April 2007, was "pitching the idea of a reality series to several major networks". Many reports claimed that the "new reality show" would focus on Spears's life and comeback to her music career. FremantleMedia, one of the documentary's distributors, posted a press release on October 9, 2008. At night of the same day, MTV, the other distributor, reported that Spears would release a documentary via their channel on November 30.

She's got a unique set of talents. She's got a blend of certain talents. She's a great singer. She's a great dancer. She's got an amazing image. She's incredibly likable. She's got this intangible thing that makes her a star.

— Larry Rudolph

The concept of producing a documentary evolved out a conversation between Spears and Rudolph, where Spears expressed her interest in presenting herself back to the public. After hitting the "low point" in her career, Spears "really wanted to be able to tell her story, talk about where she's been, where she is today and where she is going", according to Rudolph.

On November 21, 2008, Rudolph, who had been involved in the documentary, gave an exclusive interview to MTV. He explained how development of the project started and who he got involved with it: "I was very involved in putting [the film] together, so I saw the process, It was a very interesting process. We made a deal from the very beginning — everybody sort of shook hands with the understanding that there were going to be no boundaries on this thing. We were going to make an open and honest film and that we weren't going to leave the good stuff on the cutting room floor." Rudolph explained that For the Record is part of the game plan for reintroducing Spears back to her fans as a pop star rather than a tabloid fixture.

=== Filming ===
Spears teamed up with the American cable television network MTV and award-winning filmmakers Radical Media for the documentary. For the Record was shot for around three months in 2008, beginning on September 5, two days before Spears's appearance at the MTV Video Music Awards, to mid-November. The production crew used various past recordings of Spears on the documentary, her 2008 MTV Video Music Awards appearance is featured on the documentary along with the filming of the music videos to "Womanizer and "Circus." The interviews with Spears were shot at The Mondrian Hotel in Los Angeles. Spears frequented the hotel's lounge during "wilder times". Singer Madonna's cameo appearance in the documentary was filmed during her L.A. concert.

=== Music ===
For the first broadcast trailer, MTV used her 2004 single "Toxic" from her fourth studio album In the Zone and the first single "Womanizer" from her sixth studio album Circus. For the rest of the promos, the production had used Spears's newest songs such has "Out from Under", "Kill the Lights", "Quicksand", "Unusual You" and "Phonography" from her sixth studio album Circus. The instrumental version to the album's title track, "Circus", was also used for the third promo production. During the American broadcast the documentary played the instrumentals for most of Spears's songs from Circus, they also showed the recording sessions for "Trouble," "Womanizer", and "Circus". The instrumental for "Quicksand" was played in the film also.

Throughout the film, Benn Jordan's music appears quite frequently, both from his The Flashbulb releases and those under his own name, such as "Looking Upwards" from Pale Blue Dot. The music used at the end of the documentary is "Lower Your Eyelids to Die with the Sun" by French electro band M83 from their 2005 album Before the Dawn Heals Us.

== Release ==
=== Promotion ===
Britney.com, Jive Records's official Spears's site, has also promoted the documentary releasing exclusive photos, videos and interviews with Spears. Her official personal website BritneySpears.com has promoted the documentary posting pictures, and exclusive videos, her website was the first one to release the international promotional trailers, and the first one to release exclusive footage of the documentary. In order to promote the film, MTV released various commercial and movie (documentary) trailers. MTV aired The Britney Collection, promoting Circus and the documentary. The show contained Spears music videos which were chosen by her fans. The website also released a series of promotional stills taken from the film. Yahoo! TV posted an exclusive trailer of the film on Sunday November 23 a week before the release of the documentary. The promos were premiered on television nationwide on October 17 and 20 worldwide.

=== Screening ===
On November 13, 2008, Britney.com announced that Spears would host a special screening of the documentary. The website offered the chance to apply for, among the, free 200 tickets via "1iota". The screening took place in Hollywood, California on Thursday November 20 at 11:45am. Fans were asked to wear funky and trendy attire for the event, and not to take phones or cameras to the event. The day of the screening many fans were left disappointed. According to Spears's official website some of the fans that won tickets through "1iota" were eventually turned away. Many of them complained that they received an e-mail allowing them to bring up to three friends. MTV posted a two-minute trailer on November 24, 2008.

=== Broadcast ===
Britney: For the Record premiered on November 30, 2008 via MTV, two days before the birthday of Spears and the release of Circus. The network's official website posted a sneak preview on October 8. The official MTV will air the documentary in Spanish language countries such has Spainon November 30 two hours after the U.S premier. MTV Tr3s will air a special edition of the documentary subtitled into Spanish for the American public. Britney: For The Record premiered with 3.7 million viewers on MTV. The documentary premiered in France and on special Spanish-subtitled version on Sony Entertainment Television in Latin America on December 1 as well as airing in Australia on December 2.

In the United Kingdom and Ireland, Britney: For the Record premiered exclusively on Sky1 and Sky1 HD on December 1, less than 24 hours after the documentary's premiere in the United States. This coincided with the release of the album in the country. In Australia, Network Ten showed the documentary on December 2, along with Channel [V] on December 9. The documentary was also aired in France on NT1 under the title Britney Spears : la confession ("Britney Spears: The Confession"), with it being considered a major event, a countdown of the remaining days and hours frequently appearing on top of the screen and being shown on the channel's official website. It will be translated through additional voice-overs and followed by the two French-dubbed episodes of the show How I Met Your Mother featuring the artist. In Latin America, the documentary was aired in Sony Entertainment Television, December 1. In South Africa the documentary premiered on December 23, 2008 on M-Net. In Italy the documentary premiere on December 26, 2008 on MTV Italy in a special Britney Spears's day. In Turkey the documentary premiered on March 31, 2009 on Dream TV. It aired under the title "Britney: kayda geçmesi için" ("Britney: For the Record").

== DVD release ==
Britney: For the Record

Video by Britney Spears
- Released: April 7, 2009
- Recorded: 2008
- Length: 67 minutes
- Language: English
- Label: Jive
- Producer: Andrew Fried

Britney Spears chronology
Britney & Kevin: Chaotic... the DVD & More (2005)	Britney: For the Record (2009)	Britney Spears Live: The Femme Fatale Tour (2011)

Britney: For the Record is the ninth video album by American entertainer Britney Spears. Its DVD release was first announced on Spears's official website. The documentary was released to DVD on April 7, 2009 in the United States and was released on the United Kingdom's HMV website/stores on June 1, 2009. In Colombia, the DVD was released at the end of May 2009. It sold 3,095 copies in its first week in the United States. The Britney: For the Record DVD was released in Australia on August 28, 2009 at all major DVD retailers. The DVD is a director's cut of the MTV version and includes footage not previously seen on TV. Filmed around the making of her 2008 comeback album, the tell-all documentary Britney: For the Record captures Spears in intimate confessionals and revealing candid moments. The pop superstar shares her own views on her family, friends, fans, and critics, as well as the toll of her media troubles, alleged public mental breakdown, and the necessary rigors of jumping headlong back into work. In this honest and at times harrowingly introspective portrait, nothing is off the record. The DVD release peaked at number seventy-nine on the Japanese Oricon Video Chart. Britney: For the Record peaked at number three on the US Top Music Videos chart on April 25, 2009.

The DVD includes:

- Full documentary
- Scenes that did not air on MTV
- Bonus remixes of Spears's singles "Womanizer" and "Circus" in the American release:
  - "Womanizer" (Kaskade Remix) — 5:31
  - "Womanizer" (Benny Benassi Extended Remix) — 6:16
  - "Womanizer" (Junior Club Remix) — 7:42
  - "Circus" (Diplo Alt Clown Remix) — 3:12
  - "Circus" (Tom Neville's Ringleader Remix) — 7:52
  - "Circus" (Villains Remix) — 5:17
- A bonus sticker instead the six remixes in the Brazilian release
- A bonus Photo Gallery in the Thailand release

== Reception ==
=== Critical ===
Critical reaction to the documentary was mixed. Los Angeles Times gave the film a positive reaction calling the film "an unstoppable documentary, Spears can finally tell her side of the story without periods, or commas". MSNBC was negative in its review, writing that Spears provided "very little insight about her life, her decision-making, or her mistakes", and that Spears responses were "vague, occasionally contradictory". MSNBC concluded that "All that Britney: For the Record leaves us with, then, is a faint portrait of a 26-year-old whose life is unlike any other 26-year-old's, even though she wants to convince herself otherwise". The Hartford Courant criticized the documentary for being "an infomercial about rehabilitating the image of Britney Spears." The review would go on to note "'No topic was off limits,' insisted a title at the beginning of the film, which explained that MTV cameras got to follow her for 60 days this fall. 'No question went unanswered.' But of course not every question was asked in the first place." Australian newspaper The Age described it as "nothing more than a miserable, anxious limp through an entirely unsteady 'comeback'."

=== Public ===
The public's reaction towards the documentary has been positive. MTV asked various fans in New York and Los Angeles, California what they thought about the film, a fan quoted, "It made me love her even more," Shanna Birnbaum, 23, told MTV News. "I think she was very honest. She really let her true self shine through. It showed people and young girls you can get through anything." Stacey Medura, agreed, adding that "For the Record" humanized the pop star. "It's easier to understand how she feels," Medura said. "Her opinion matters most. I think she covered a lot [in the special]." Some said this look into Britney's life was inspiring. "I really have gained a lot of respect for her now," Derek wrote. "I felt like this was the first time since she burst onto the scene a decade ago that she has spoken from the heart. ... I think this is what fans and others have wanted from her for a long time, to be honest. Her honesty can be helpful for others who may be going through situations like hers, such as dealing with a custody battle."

=== Ratings ===
MTV reported that Britney: For the Record accumulated the largest average viewers on a regular Sunday with averaged 3.7 million viewers, per the network. Combined with the rerun immediately after the first showing, it received 5.6 million viewers overall. The documentary received three times more viewers than various MTV series including their number one hit series The Hills. In Australia, the primetime broadcast on Network Ten attracted a national audience of 1.42 million viewers, which equates to just under 7% of the entire country's population. The documentary, as such, became the fourth most watched programme of the week. In the United Kingdom, the broadcast received 391,000 viewers and 1.8% share. Moreover, it also received 4.6% amongst adults 16-34 and 5.1% among women 16-34. Aside from a repeat of Doctor Who on BBC Three, Britney: For the Record was the highest rated multichannel (cable) show for the night (December 1, 2008). According to Televisa Views in Mexico, the documentary scored the number one spot two nights in a row. On its debut night, the documentary was viewed by more than 2.3 million viewers, and on its second night it scored 2 million for a total of 4.3 million views in the two showings. It also beat Desperate Housewives for the Sunday showing in the country by 1.25 million.
