= Mils =

Mils may refer to:

- Mils (band), a French electronic band
- Mils, Austria, a town in the district Innsbruck Land, Tyrol, Austria
- Mils bei Imst, a municipality in the district of Imst, Tyrol, Austria
- Missile Impact Location System, an acoustic system to locate test missile nose cone impacts
- Mission interministérielle de lutte contre les sectes or "Interministerial Mission in the Fight Against Cults", a French government agency
- Multiple Independent Levels of Security, a high-assurance security architecture
- Mils, a unit of angle based on the milliradian

== See also ==
- Mil (disambiguation)
- Mill (disambiguation)
