= Anne Laplantine =

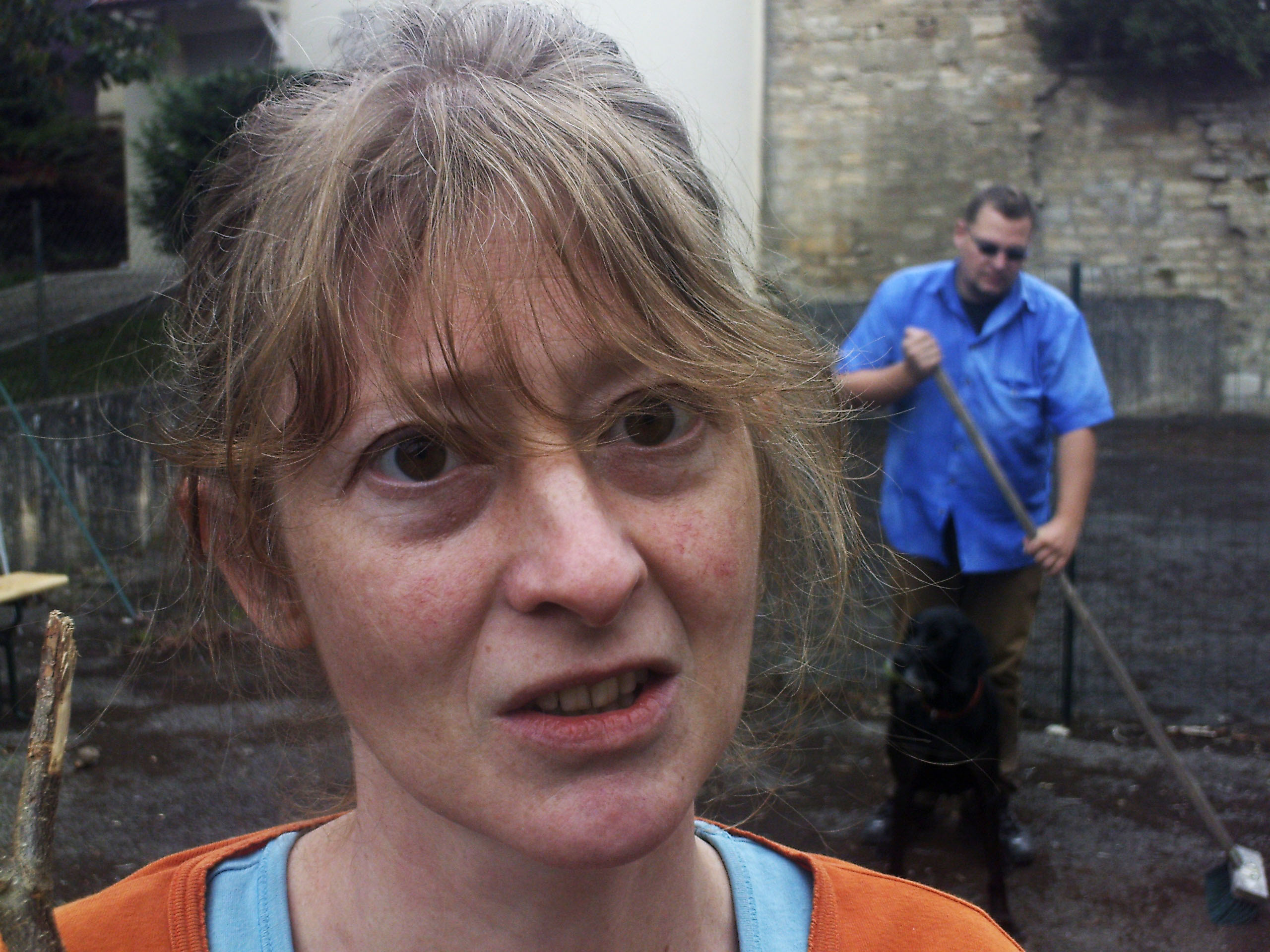
- Anne Laplantine in 2009

Background information
- Also known as: Michiko Kusaki, Angelika Koehlermann
- Born: 21 October 1972 (age 52); Lyon, France
- Genres: Electronic music
- Years active: 1999–present

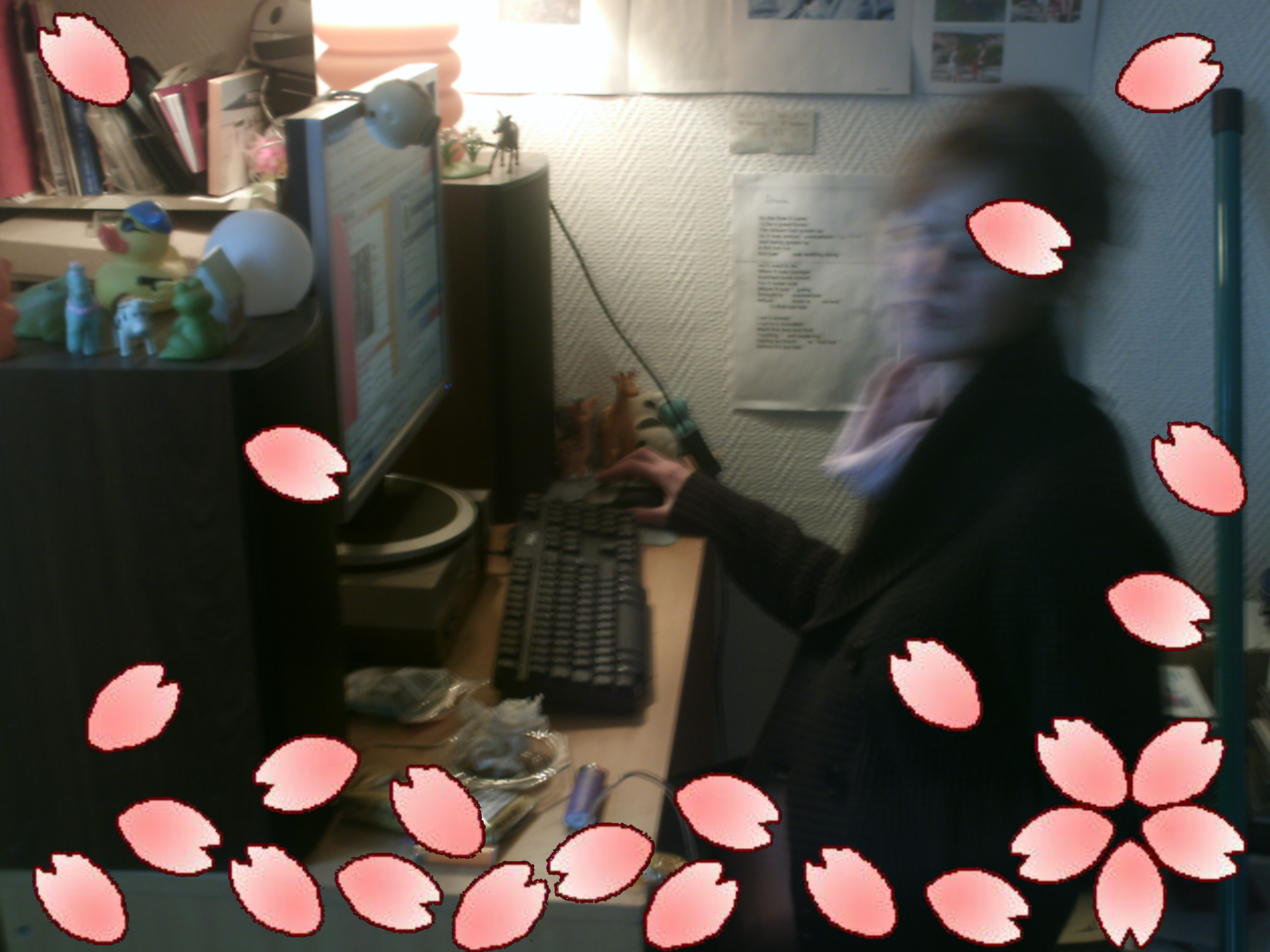
Anne Laplantine at work

Anne Laplantine (born 21 October 1972), also known as Michiko Kusaki or Angelika Koehlermann, is a French musician and video artist. She currently lives and works in Paris.

== Discography ==
=== Albums ===
==== As Anne Laplantine ====
- 1999: Nordheim (Gooom Disques)
- 2000: Alison (Alice in Wonder)
- 2001: Live à Dijon (Alice in Wonder)
- 2003: Anne : Hamburg (Datamusik)
- 2003: Anne : Hamburg, 3x7" (Tomlab)
- 2004: Discipline (Emphase)
- 2005: We (Elefantkvinnan)
- 2009: A Little May Time Be (Ahornfelder)
- 2009: Spring Won't Find Us 7" (Tona Serenad)

==== As Michiko Kusaki ====
- 1999: Bye Bye, Babe (Angelika Koehlermann)
- 2002: Don't Do That (Hiao Hiao Hiao)

==== As Angelika Koehlermann ====
- 2002: Care (Tomlab)

==== Collaborations ====
- 2004: Summerisle, with Momus (Analog Baroque)
- 2005: Starts, with Semuin (Happy Zloty)
- 2007: Fa, with F. S. Blumm (Alien Transistor)

=== Compilations ===
- 2000: formotiondisconfort,callflightattendantforbagdisposal (Peter I'm Flying) :
  - "For Motion Disconfort"
- 2000: French Tour (Technikart) :
  - "Video Game"
- 2000: Gooom Tracks (Gooom Disques) :
  - "This Activity"
- 2000: Christmas Album (Evenement) :
  - "La Tarte aux pommes"
  - "Messe"
- 2001: Traversées [French Fresh Sounds] (UR Éditions)
- 2001: VPRO De Avonden XMAS 2001 (VPRO)
- 2003: The Second Coco Waffle Flake (Skipp) :
  - "Untitled"
- 2003: One on One (Emphase) :
  - "Flute"
- 2004: Spex CD #42 (Spex Magazine) :
  - "Discipline 2"
- 2004: Re:Electronicat (Angelika Koelhermann) :
  - "Birds Want to Have Fun"
- 2005: Blackbox (Emphase) :
  - "Discipline 5"
- 2005: Childish Music (Staubgold) :
  - "December"
- 2006: CTM.07 Audio Compilation (club transmediale) :
  - "Xavier"
- 2007: I Regret Not Having Kissed You (Doki Doki) :
  - "Spring Won't Find Us"
- 2008: Vänskap 002 :
  - "Seaside"
- 2019: VOLUME#1 (fruits) :
  - "T'es où"

=== Participations, remixes, others ===
- 1999: Michiko Kusaki/DMX Krew - Let's Rock Baby, split EP (Breaking Records)
- 2000: Re:Kusaki (Angelika Koelhermann)
- 2001: Encre - Encre (Clapping Music)
- 2001: Hans Platzgumer - Denial of Service (Separator)
- 2002: Hans Platzgumer - Software (Doxa Records)
- 2002: Hypo - Karaoke A Cappela (Active Suspension)
- 2003: Sluta Leta - Semi Peterson (Mego)
- 2004: F.S. Blumm - Sesamsamen (Plop)
- 2005: Hans Platzgumer - Expedition 87-04 (Buntspecht)
- 2005: Semuin - Province (Audio Dregs)
- 2006: F.S. Blumm - Summer Kling (Morr Music)
- 2007: Hypo - Deluxe Edition Archival Recordings 2000-2007 (Intikrec)
- 2007: A.J. Holmes - The King of the New Electric Hi-Life (Pingipung)
- 2013: Aline - Regarde le ciel (PIAS France)

== See also ==
- Momus (artist)
- Gooom Disques
