= Mils (band) =

- Origin: France
- Genres: Electronic; Experimental; IDM
- Years active: 1994–present
- Labels: Gooom Disques (France) others

Mils, founded in 1994, is a self-described experimental band, mostly in the electronic genre. The band has made at least two of its albums available for free download on its website. They currently share the Gooom Disques label with the better-known band M83, and have made several remixes of their songs.

== Discography ==
=== Tapes ===
- le banquet (1994)
- 96 (1996)

=== Albums ===
- .mils (2001)
- sept masses déplacées (1999)
- echotones 1.0 (2001)
- le grand pic mou (2003)
- neuf immatériels (2004) free download from the band's site
- echotones 2.0 (2005) free download from the band's site

=== Singles ===
- nature et robots sauvages (1998)
- fact4 (2000)
- fractions (2001)
- lit clos (2001)
