= Sweet Beliefs =

Studio album by Cyann & Ben
- Released: 18 September 2006
- Genre: Post-rock; Dream pop
- Label: Ever Records

Cyann & Ben chronology
Happy Like an Autumn Tree (2004)	Sweet Beliefs (2006)

Sweet Beliefs is the third full-length album by Cyann & Ben. It was released on 18 September 2006 on Ever Records.

== Track listing ==
1. "Words"
2. "Sunny Morning"
3. "Sweet Beliefs"
4. "In Union with..."
5. "Guilty"
6. "Recurring"
7. "Let It Play"
8. "Somewhere in the Light of Time"
9. "Sparks of Love"

== Reception ==
- Allmusic link
- Pitchfork Media (7.3/10) link
