= Justine Kurland =

American photographer

- Born: 1969 (age 56–57); Warsaw, New York
- Education: Yale University
- Known for: Photography
- Notable work: Spirit West, Old Joy
- Movement: Neo-romanticism
- Website: www.justinekurland.com

Justine Kurland (born 1969) is an American fine art photographer, based in New York City.

== Early life and education ==
Kurland was born in Warsaw, New York. She earned her B.F.A. from the School of Visual Arts in 1996. She went on to study with Gregory Crewdson at Yale University where she received an M.F.A. in 1998.

== Life and career ==
Kurland first gained public notice with her work in the group show Another Girl, Another Planet (1999), at New York's Van Doren Waxter gallery. The show included her large c-print staged tableau pictures of neo-romantic landscapes inhabited by young adolescent girls, half-sprites, half juvenile delinquents. This was her first exhibition of a photographic interest that lasted from 1997, when she began taking pictures of her mentor Laurie Simmons's babysitter and her friends, to 2002. Altogether, Kurland published 69 pictures of girls in a series called "Girl Pictures." The staged photos take place in urban and wilderness settings, with girls depicted as though to imply they are runaways, hopeful and independent.

As landscapes she chose the 'secret places' of late childhood; wasteland on the edges of suburbia, 'owned' only by a feral nature and unsupervised children. Her book Spirit West (2000) featured similar work on a more ambitious scale. In early 2001 Kurland spent several months in New Zealand, where she created similar work with schoolgirls there.

In her show Community, Skyblue (2002), Kurland turned to documenting the utopian communes of Virginia and California, highlighting the unworldly aspirations of the communards by having them appear naked in her pictures and showing them as only distant figures in their landscape. In 2003 she had European solo shows Golden Dawn (London) and Welcome Home (Vienna), based around these series of commune images.

Old Joy (2004) turns to men. She shows visionaries trekking naked into the wilderness, where they undergo spiritual experiences. In her 2004 show Songs of Experience she explored medieval and Biblical imagery. In 2005 she had a solo show in Japan. After having a son, Kurland began to photograph pregnant women and new mothers ("Mama Baby", 2004–2007). Her son's interest in trains would lead her to photograph hobos and trains from 2007 to 2011 ("This Train Is Bound for Glory"); as he grew up, she became interested in American masculinity, and created photographs of cars and mechanics ("Sincere Auto Care," 2014–2015).

Kurland's work appears on the cover and liner notes of French electronic/shoegaze group M83's 2004 album Dead Cities, Red Seas & Lost Ghosts, as well as the covers of the EP releases for the album.

In an article in Artforum (April 2000) she talked of her inspirations: "I'm always thinking about painting: nineteenth-century English picturesque landscapes and the utopian ideal, genre paintings, and also Julia Margaret Cameron's photographs. I started going to museums at an early age, but my imagery is equally influenced by illustrations from the fairy tales I read as a child."

Selections from her work Highway Kind were published in the book The Open Road: Photography & the American Road Trip by David Campany.

== Personal life ==
Kurland began dating women shortly after completing her "Girls" series, work with an undercurrent of sex and female sexuality. As of 2018 she had been dating her current female partner for three years. Kurland lives and works in New York City.

== Publications ==
=== Books by Kurland ===
- Spirit West. Coromandel, 2000. ISBN 9780998631257
- Another Girl, Another Planet. Lawrence Rubin Greenberg / Van Doren Fine Art, 2001.
- Old Joy. Artspace, 2004. ISBN 1-891273-05-1.
- Highway Kind. Aperture, 2016. ISBN 978-1597113281.
- Girl Pictures. Aperture, 2020. ISBN 9781683952183.
- SCUMB Manifesto. Mack, 2022. ISBN 978-1-913620-56-1.

=== Publications with contributions by Kurland ===
- Campany, David (2014). The Open Road: Photography & the American Road Trip. New York City: Aperture. ISBN 978-1-59711-240-6. OCLC 933446167.

== Exhibitions ==
- Another Girl, Another Planet (1999), Van Doren Waxter, New York
- Girl Pictures, 1997-2002 (2018), Mitchell-Innes & Nash, New York
- SCUMB Manifesto (2021), Higher Pictures Generation, New York
- Self-Pleasure (2024), Thomas Erben Gallery, New York Group exhibition featuring Tofo Bardi, Nicole Eisenman, Chitra Ganesh, Andrea Éva Győri, Kinke Kooi, Jacky Marshall, Shala Miller, Anne Minich, Senga Nengudi, Janice Nowinski, Adrian Piper, Carla Williams, Jin Young Lee
