= Junk (M83 album) =

Studio album by M83
- Released: 8 April 2016
- Genres: Synth-pop; bubblegum pop; electro-rock
- Length: 55:40
- Labels: Naïve; Mute
- Producers: Anthony Gonzalez; Justin Meldal-Johnsen

M83 chronology
Hurry Up, We're Dreaming (2011)	Junk (2016)	DSVII (2019)

Singles from Junk
- 1. "Do It, Try It" Released: 1 March 2016; 2. "Solitude" Released: 18 March 2016; 3. "Go!" Released: 4 April 2016

Junk is the seventh studio album by French electronic music band M83, released on 8 April 2016 on Naïve Records in France and Mute Records in the United States. It is the first album released by the band in a half-decade since 2011's Hurry Up, We're Dreaming and the first release since Digital Shades Vol. 1 (2007) without longtime vocalist and keyboardist Morgan Kibby. The album also features guest appearances from Mai Lan, Steve Vai, Susanne Sundfør, Beck and Jordan Lawlor.

== Background ==
Junk marks the band's first studio release without longtime vocalist and keyboardist Morgan Kibby, who left the band prior to recording sessions of the album. On 4 March 2016, Gonzalez announced that Dallas musician Kaela Sinclair would be replacing Kibby for the upcoming tour supporting Junk, whom he found by crowd-sourcing online. The track "Walkway Blues" marks the debut songwriting and lead vocal contribution of Jordan Lawlor, better known by his stage name J. Laser, who was also recruited through a crowd-sourced audition in 2011.

Gonzalez noted that he was inspired by 1970s and 1980s television shows such as Punky Brewster and Who's the Boss?, stating, "I feel like TV shows are starting to sound and look the same. There's no more passion anymore. So this album is a tribute to those old-fashioned shows." The album's artwork appears to be a reference to the McDonald's Fry Kids, which were prominent in the McDonaldland commercials from that era.

Guitarist Steve Vai makes an uncredited appearance on the track "Go!".

== Release ==
The album's first single, "Do It, Try It", was released on 1 March 2016. The second single from the album, "Solitude", was released on 18 March 2016. The third single from the album, "Go!", featuring Mai Lan, was released on 5 April 2016.

== Critical reception ==
Professional ratings
Aggregate scores
Source	Rating
AnyDecentMusic?	6.3/10
Metacritic	66/100
Review scores
Source	Rating
AllMusic	4/5 stars
The A.V. Club	A−
Chicago Tribune	2/4 stars
The Guardian	3/5 stars
Mojo	2/5 stars
Pitchfork	6.8/10
Q	5/5 stars
Rolling Stone	2/5 stars
Spin	6/10
Uncut	7/10

Junk received generally favourable reviews from contemporary music critics. At Metacritic, which assigns a normalised rating out of 100 to reviews from mainstream critics, the album received an average score of 66, based on 29 reviews, which indicates "generally favorable reviews".

John Everhart of The A.V. Club wrote that Junk is "easily M83's most challenging, best album to date", praising the tracks for being "unassumingly gorgeous and maudlin, with jarring unpredictability" and Gonzalez for "coaxing jaw-droppingly stunning performances" from his special guests like Sundfør, Steve Vai and Beck, concluding that: "Junk can be a difficult listen at points, but Gonzalez has been given time and attracted ample collaborators due to the sheer good will of being a musician who cares about music." AllMusic editor Heather Phares praised the album's various 80s-influenced production choices, saying that the "cultural dumpster-diving works so well because it's done with lots of love and zero irony." Phares added that Junk's musical journey to the past is similar to Daft Punk's Random Access Memories, only Gonzalez is content to make the type of music he loves on his own terms, concluding that: "While all listeners may not share his fascination with '80s pop culture detritus, it's hard not to respect how expertly he transforms it into something genuine."

In The New York Times, Ben Ratliff wrote that Junk "expands somewhat on the strengths of Hurry Up, balancing Italo-disco chill-out atmospheres and calibrated buildups and releases." Paul MacInnes from The Guardian said about Gonzalez's penchant for 80s nostalgia throughout the record: "It's fantasy stuff – evocative rather than perceptive, and awfully cheesy. But it's also incredibly refined. The love and care that has gone into this ersatz rendering of a remembered past is quite overpowering. It's like someone carving a bust of Jennifer Warnes in marble."

Harley Brown of Spin found some "poignant moments" ("Do It, Try It", "Solitude") on the album, but felt the rest of the homages to 80s cheese were "so outlandish they sound almost ironic," and that Gonzalez wasn't putting much effort into crafting his own "nostalgic fantasies". Greg Kot of the Chicago Tribune commended the middle portion ("Solitude", "Laser Gun", Road Blaster") for being able to "merge [the album's] junk-pop sensibility with inventive arrangements" but found it "decidedly mixed" overall, concluding that: "M83 has rarely made music that sounds emotionally hollow, but Junk provides an unfortunate exception." Suzy Exposito of Rolling Stone gave praise to the featured artists throughout the track list, singling out Mai Lan's performance on "Laser Gun" and "Atlantique Sud" for putting a "timeless, ghostly vocal sheen" on a record that "leans too heavily on the quirks from the past, rife with the least flattering odds and ends of a time long gone."

Stereogum ranked Junk number 43 on their list of the 50 Best Albums of 2016. The website's writer Ryan Leas called it "the sound of youth's forgotten detritus, filtered through the wrong drugs, playing out like a frantic-then-hazy Day-Glo plot twist to the neon romanticism of Hurry Up, We're Dreaming." He concluded that: "This might not be the sequel we expected, but it's a rewarding one defined by its flickering effervescence."

== Track listing ==
No.	Title	Writer(s)	Length
1.	"Do It, Try It"	Anthony Gonzalez	3:37
2.	"Go!" (featuring Mai Lan and Steve Vai)	A. Gonzalez; Mai Lan Chapiron	3:55
3.	"Walkway Blues" (featuring Jordan Lawlor)	A. Gonzalez; Lawlor	4:49
4.	"Bibi the Dog" (featuring Mai Lan)	A. Gonzalez; Chapiron; Justin Meldal-Johnsen	3:54
5.	"Moon Crystal"	A. Gonzalez	2:26
6.	"For the Kids" (featuring Susanne Sundfør)	A. Gonzalez; Sundfør; Yann Gonzalez; Dave Palmer	4:41
7.	"Solitude"	A. Gonzalez	6:03
8.	"The Wizard"	A. Gonzalez	2:25
9.	"Laser Gun" (featuring Mai Lan)	A. Gonzalez; Chapiron	4:16
10.	"Road Blaster"	A. Gonzalez; Lawlor; Meldal-Johnsen	4:21
11.	"Tension"	A. Gonzalez	2:05
12.	"Atlantique Sud" (featuring Mai Lan)	A. Gonzalez; Chapiron	3:24
13.	"Time Wind" (featuring Beck)	A. Gonzalez; Beck Hansen; Meldal-Johnsen	4:09
14.	"Ludivine"	A. Gonzalez	1:35
15.	"Sunday Night 1987"	A. Gonzalez; Y. Gonzalez	4:00
Total length:			55:40

== Personnel ==
- Anthony Gonzalez – production, engineering, art direction
- Justin Meldal-Johnsen – production, engineering
- Dave Cooley – mastering
- Cameron Lister – mixing
- Tony Hoffer – mixing
- Carlos de la Garza – engineering
- Darrell Thorp – engineering
- Jolyon Thomas – engineering
- Mike Schuppan – engineering
- Ryan Marrone – engineering
- Satoshi Noguchi – engineering
- Andy Ford – engineering assistance
- David Schwerkolt – engineering assistance
- Geoff Neal – engineering assistance
- Mike Fasano – drum technician, tuning
- Randal Pizzardini Borg – layout
- Shane Konen – layout
- Tim Kent – photography

== Charts ==
Chart (2016)	Peak position
Australian Albums (ARIA)	12
Belgian Albums (Ultratop Flanders)	34
Belgian Albums (Ultratop Wallonia)	30
Canadian Albums (Billboard)	46
Dutch Albums (Album Top 100)	57
French Albums (SNEP)	26
German Albums (Offizielle Top 100)	87
Irish Albums (IRMA)	52
Irish Independent Albums (IRMA)	6
Norwegian Albums (VG-lista)	34
Scottish Albums (Official Charts)	30
Spanish Albums (Promusicae)	56
Swiss Albums (Schweizer Hitparade)	30
UK Albums (Official Charts)	28
UK Independent Albums (Official Charts)	6
US Billboard 200	26
US Independent Albums (Billboard)	3
US Top Alternative Albums (Billboard)	4
US Top Rock Albums (Billboard)	6
