= Saturdays = Youth =

Studio album by M83
- Released: 11 April 2008
- Recorded: 2007
- Studios: Rockfield (Monmouth, Wales)
- Genres: Synth-pop; new wave; dream pop
- Length: 62:12
- Label: Virgin
- Producer: Ken Thomas

M83 chronology
Digital Shades Vol. 1 (2007)	Saturdays = Youth (2008)	Hurry Up, We're Dreaming (2011)

Singles from Saturdays = Youth
- 1. "Couleurs" Released: 25 February 2008; 2. "Graveyard Girl" Released: 28 April 2008; 3. "Kim & Jessie" Released: 21 July 2008; 4. "We Own the Sky" Released: 1 December 2008

Saturdays = Youth is the fifth studio album by French electronic music band M83, released on 11 April 2008 by Virgin Records. The album was produced by Ken Thomas, with co-production by Ewan Pearson and M83 frontman Anthony Gonzalez.

The album yielded four singles: "Couleurs" in February 2008, "Graveyard Girl" in April, "Kim & Jessie" in July and "We Own the Sky" in December. "Kim & Jessie" was placed at number 256 on Pitchfork's list of "The Top 500 Tracks of the 2000s" in August 2009.

As of October 2011, the album had sold 76,000 copies in the United States, according to Nielsen SoundScan. Sales outside of France between 1 October 2011 and 30 September 2012 reached 152,300 copies, according to Le Bureau Export.

== Critical reception ==
Professional ratings
Aggregate scores
Source	Rating
Metacritic	70/100
Review scores
Source	Rating
AllMusic	4.5/5 stars
Alternative Press	3.5/5 stars
The A.V. Club	A
Blender	3.5/5 stars
The Boston Phoenix	3/4 stars
The Guardian	3/5 stars
Pitchfork	8.5/10
Q	2/5 stars
Slant Magazine	4/5 stars
Spin	2.5/5 stars

Saturdays = Youth received generally positive reviews from music critics. At Metacritic, which assigns a normalised rating out of 100 to reviews from mainstream publications, the album received an average score of 70, based on 29 reviews. Andy Battaglia of The A.V. Club wrote that Saturdays=Youth "boasts a more expansive sense of space" than the band's previous albums, and opined "For all the awe kindled by the effectively perfect sound in a transcendent highlight like 'Kim & Jessie,' the real triumph is that M83 uses such a setting for more simple melody and emotion than ever before." Dave Hughes of Slant Magazine stated, "Although many songs still build toward walls of synth that flirt with white noise, the trademark crescendos are both leavened and deepened by being recast as textural objects and woven into lyrical pop songs." Brian Howe of Pitchfork noted that Saturdays=Youth's songs "disperse in all directions: Producers Ewan Pearson and Ken Thomas spread the melodies and beats into a sound world of uncommon vibrancy and pristine clarity, mounted on a massive yet now more proportionate scale", adding that the album "meaningfully diversifies M83's catalog while retaining Gonzalez's indelible fingerprint." Drowned in Sound's Alex Denney commented that "Gonzales has taken a dive head-first into the lexicon of '80s pop culture and emerged with a clutch of winning tracks that borrow openly from any number of pin-ups of the era and glaze them in his breathy, expansive shoegaze sound his to generally winning effect." AllMusic reviewer Heather Phares concluded, "As super-stylized as its sounds and emotions are, Saturdays=Youth always seems genuine, even when it feels like its songs are made from the memories of other songs. For all of its nostalgic haze, it's some of M83's most focused music."

In a mixed review, Dorian Lynskey of The Guardian expressed that "[t]o call Saturdays=Youth derivative is to pay it a compliment, because every retro synth sounds calibrated to provide the maximum nostalgic rush—if not for your own adolescence, then at least for that of a poetic outcast in a John Hughes film", but noted that "[i]t's a shame the songwriting evaporates in a haze of rote shoe-gazing and ambient murmurs halfway through." Dan Raper of PopMatters felt that "it is a little disappointing that the point of Saturdays=Youth kind of misses the point. The more conventional 'song'-like material does have something of M83's stately grandeur but feels somewhat hollow, probably because the slow-burn's integral to the act's power." Benjamin Boles of Canadian newspaper Now believed that the album is "more derivative and familiar than Anthony Gonzalez's past work as M83, which means it's more accessible but also less innovative and original. All the dreamy, ethereal glitter drowns the songs; the album overall is mostly about texture and nostalgia." Spin's Mosi Reeves was unimpressed, writing that "[o]nly a few compelling songs, particularly the lush darkwave instrumental 'Couleurs' and the breezy shoegaze rock of 'Graveyard Girl,' emerge from the bathos." Ben Hogwood of musicOMH found that "M83 still show plenty of guile and in their best moments present music of hidden power and grace. But in this record they seem to become too preoccupied with their 80s tribute for that to continually shine through."

Pitchfork ranked Saturdays = Youth at number eight on its list of "The 50 Best Albums of 2008" and at number 111 on its list of "The Top 200 Albums of the 2000s". The album was also named the best album of 2008 by Drowned in Sound and Urban Outfitters.

== Track listing ==
No.	Title	Writer(s)	Length
1.	"You, Appearing"	Anthony Gonzalez	3:40
2.	"Kim & Jessie"	A. Gonzalez; Yann Gonzalez; Morgan Kibby	5:23
3.	"Skin of the Night"	A. Gonzalez; Kibby	6:12
4.	"Graveyard Girl"	A. Gonzalez; Y. Gonzalez	4:50
5.	"Couleurs"	A. Gonzalez	8:34
6.	"Up!"	A. Gonzalez; Kibby	4:28
7.	"We Own the Sky"	A. Gonzalez; Y. Gonzalez	5:02
8.	"Highway of Endless Dreams"	A. Gonzalez; Y. Gonzalez	4:35
9.	"Too Late"	A. Gonzalez; Kibby	5:00
10.	"Dark Moves of Love"	A. Gonzalez; Y. Gonzalez	3:18
11.	"Midnight Souls Still Remain"	A. Gonzalez	11:10

iTunes Store bonus track
No.	Title	Writer(s)	Length
12.	"Until the Night Is Over"	A. Gonzalez; Nicolas Fromageau	6:10

Japanese edition bonus tracks
No.	Title	Writer(s)	Length
12.	"Graveyard Girl" (Yuksek Remix)	A. Gonzalez; Y. Gonzalez	5:13
13.	"Kim & Jessie" (datA Remix)	A. Gonzalez; Y. Gonzalez; Kibby	5:00
14.	"We Own the Sky" (Maps Remix)	A. Gonzalez; Y. Gonzalez	5:09

== Personnel ==
Credits adapted from the liner notes of Saturdays = Youth.

=== M83 ===
- Anthony Gonzalez – vocals, keyboards, bass, guitars, piano
- Loïc Maurin – drums, percussion, guitar, bass, keyboards
- Morgan Kibby – vocals, piano, keyboards

=== Additional musicians ===
- Ewan Pearson – additional keyboards

=== Technical ===
- Ken Thomas – production, mixing
- Ewan Pearson – co-production, pre-production
- Anthony Gonzalez – co-production, pre-production, mixing
- Richard Matthews – recording assistance
- Jolyon Thomas – guitar technician
- Tom Bailey – mixing assistance

=== Artwork ===
- Anouck Bertin – sleeve photography
- Anthony Gonzalez – art direction
- Paul A. Taylor – art direction assistance
- Louise Downer – artwork design

== Charts ==
Chart performance for Saturdays = Youth
Chart (2008)	Peak position
French Albums (SNEP)	173
US Billboard 200	107
US Heatseekers Albums (Billboard)	1
US Top Dance Albums (Billboard)	4

== Release history ==
Release dates and formats for Saturdays = Youth
Region	Date	Format	Label	Ref.
Australia	11 April 2008	CD; digital download	EMI	
France	14 April 2008	CD; digital download	Virgin	
United Kingdom	14 April 2008	CD; digital download	Mute	
United States	15 April 2008	CD; digital download	Mute	
Germany	9 May 2008	CD; digital download	EMI	
Japan	1 July 2009	CD; digital download	EMI Music Japan	
