= I Wrote You a Letter =

Studio album by M83
- Released: 25 September 2026
- Studios: Other Suns (Los Angeles); The Auber Mansion (Paris); Hulen (Copenhagen)
- Genres: Electronica; shoegaze
- Length: 40:00
- Label: Other Suns
- Producers: Anthony Gonzalez; Benoît de Villeneuve

M83 chronology
Fantasy (2023)	I Wrote You a Letter (2026)

Singles from I Wrote You a Letter
- 1. "Blister Sunrise" Released: 4 September 2026

I Wrote You a Letter is the tenth studio album by the French electronic band M83. It was released on 25 September 2026 through lead performer Anthony Gonzalez's own label, Other Suns. It was initially announced, with cover art and tracklist, on 22 July 2026 via the group's official website and their Instagram page. The opening track, "Blister Sunrise", was released as the lead single on 4 September.

== Background ==
The release of M83's previous album, Fantasy, in 2023, marked the debut of Gonzalez's independent music label, named Other Suns, powered by Believe Music. This label would later receive a couple of soundtracks composed by M83 (namely A Necessary Escape, for the 2025 film Dakar: Race Against the Desert, and Resurrection, for the homonymous film directed by Bi Gan), while also hosting studio albums of artists associated with the band, including Kaela Sinclair's Supraliminal and Benoît de Villeneuve's Soul Tuning, both in 2025. Concurrently, with M83's ninth studio album released, Gonzalez held an artistic priority of touring throughout North America and Europe, and with the conclusion of the shows, he began producing the aforementioned soundtracks and the next full-length album in 2024, in the continued vision of making cinematic soundscapes for "people to go on big adventures, to feel alive and to forget about the world", as he said in an interview by Clash Music about Fantasy.

I Wrote You a Letter, according to Gonzalez, was developed based on his mental state over the previous years leading to the album, and brings back some characteristics of the group's early focus on walls of sound and crescendos, mainly reminiscent of shoegaze and indietronica.

== Artwork ==
Designed by Jean-Phillipe Talaga, the artwork is a reproduction of Untitled 2008/09, by Australian photographer Bill Henson, which shows large walls of rock on the sides of an ocean, with clouds in the distance. This photo has a large gradient barrier around it, consisting of three colors blended together.

== Reception ==
Riff Magazine had positive reviews for the album, saying it "offers breathtaking clarity both in its sonic and thematic spaces".

== Track listing ==
I Wrote You a Letter track listing
No.	Title	Writer(s)	Length
1.	"Blister Sunrise"	Anthony Gonzalez; Benoît de Villeneuve	3:20
2.	"Opera"	Gonzalez; De Villeneuve	6:48
3.	"Siren / Behold... Beasts"	Gonzalez; De Villeneuve	5:08
4.	"Aged"	Gonzalez; De Villeneuve; Clément Libes	6:38
5.	"Losing Ground"	Gonzalez; De Villeneuve; Libes	4:39
6.	"Soldiers of Lust"	Gonzalez; De Villeneuve; Libes	2:06
7.	"Heart Motion Foto"	Gonzalez; De Villeneuve	2:54
8.	"Feeding Time"	Gonzalez; De Villeneuve; Libes	5:51
9.	"Traces of Love"	Gonzalez; De Villeneuve; Libes	2:37
Total length:			40:00

== Personnel ==
Credits are adapted from the album's liner notes.

=== M83 ===
- Anthony Gonzalez – piano, synthesizers, guitars, vocals, production
- Benoît de Villeneuve – synthesizers, programming, guitars, vocals, production
- Clément Libes – bass, guitars, vioiln, viola, drum programming, synthesizers, additional production, arrangements on "Traces of Love"
- Joe Berry – woodwinds, saxophone, vocals, synthesizers, arrangements

=== Additional contributors ===
- Nathan Salon – mixing
- Paul Corley – mixing
- Heba Kadry – mastering
- Kaela Sinclair – additional vocals on "Blister Sunrise"
- Théophile Antolinos – guitar on "Opera"
- Anna Maehl – additional vocals on "Opera"
- Bill Henson – cover photograph
- Jean-Philippe Talaga – album design

== Charts ==
Chart performance for I Wrote You a Letter
Chart (2026)	Peak position
Belgian Albums (Ultratop Flanders)	163
French Albums (SNEP)	163
Scottish Albums (Official Charts)	89
UK Albums Sales (Official Charts)	70
UK Independent Albums (Official Charts)	34
