= Do It, Try It =

Single by M83

from the album Junk
- Released: 1 March 2016
- Length: 3:37
- Label: Naïve; Mute
- Songwriter: Anthony Gonzalez

M83 singles chronology
"Oblivion" (2013)	"Do It, Try It" (2016)	"Solitude" (2016)

Music video
- "Do It, Try It" (Official) on YouTube

"Do It, Try It" is a song by French electronic music band M83. The track was first released on 1 March 2016 as a single from the group's seventh studio album, Junk.

It was featured in the Season 8 finale of Letterkenny.

== Music Video ==
An official music video, directed by David Wilson, was uploaded online on 14 August 2017. Set within a fast food restaurant called Grab My Junk (whose mascots appear to be the creatures depicted on the cover of the Junk album) It follows a dysfunctional nuclear family with the parents arguing with each other (lip synching to the song's lyrics), an easily distracted young daughter and their son who draws pictures of heroes and monsters. The drawings come to life in fantasy sequences where they lay waste to the restaurant. Eventually, the parents throw the drawings away after the boy gets into a brief argument with his sister and goes into one final kaleidoscopic fantasy sequence that ends with the boy letting out a huge burp.

== Charts ==
Chart performance for "Do It, Try It"
Chart (2016)	Peak position
France (SNEP)	87
US Hot Rock & Alternative Songs (Billboard)	28
