= Graveyard Girl =

Song by M83

Single by M83

from the album Saturdays = Youth
- Released: 28 April 2008
- Recorded: 2007; Rockfield Studios, Wales
- Genre: Synth-pop; new wave; shoegaze; pop
- Length: 4:51
- Label: Mute (US); Virgin; EMI (Europe)
- Songwriters: Anthony Gonzalez; Yann Gonzalez
- Producers: Ken Thomas (producer); Ewan Pearson; Anthony Gonzalez (co-producers)

M83 singles chronology
"Couleurs" (2008)	"Graveyard Girl" (2008)	"Kim & Jessie" (2008)

"Graveyard Girl" is a song by French electronic act M83. Written by Anthony Gonzalez with his brother Yann, it was released in April 2008 as the second single from M83's fifth studio album, Saturdays = Youth.

== Background and composition ==
Anthony Gonzalez cited English band Tears for Fears and Scottish band Cocteau Twins, as well as John Hughes teen films The Breakfast Club and Sixteen Candles, as inspirations for Saturdays = Youth. A girl resembling Molly Ringwald appears on the album cover, and the lyrics and music video for "Graveyard Girl" further highlight these influences. "I wanted to have the feeling of a teenager mixed with this period of the Eighties," Gonzalez said. The song tells the story of a goth girl Gonzalez once knew who "worships Satan" but "dreams of a sister like Molly Ringwald."

== Critical reception ==
Spin's Mosi Reeves called "Graveyard Girl" one of the album's "few compelling songs." Dave Hughes of Slant Magazine said the song is "certainly the most typically, successfully pop moment this difficult, often transcendent act has ever produced." Pitchfork's Amy Phillips wrote that "Anthony Gonzalez makes the teen years seem idyllic, a time in life when all emotion is pure and beautiful," and that the song is "melodramatic, overblown, and even a little bit silly. But then again, so is high school." Jer Fairall of PopMatters suggested that on "Graveyard Girl", M83 found "pure pop perfection by dipping into the pool of mid-'80s synth-pop." Treble's Tyler Parks noted: "It is quite possible that no one has ever sung quite so sweetly of someone worshipping Satan."

=== Accolades ===
Publication	Country	Accolade	Year	Rank
Pitchfork	US	Top 100 Tracks of 2008	2008	46
PopMatters	US	Best 50 Singles of 2008	2008	17
Rockdelux	Spain	Lo Mejor de 2008	2009	40
Treble	US	Top 50 Songs of 2008	2008	1
The Village Voice	US	2008 Pazz & Jop	2008	46

== Track listing ==
No.	Title	Writer(s)	Length
1.	"Graveyard Girl"	Anthony Gonzalez; Yann Gonzalez	4:51
2.	"Graveyard Girl" (Yuksek remix)	A. Gonzalez; Y. Gonzalez	5:13

== Other versions and appearances ==
A remix by French DJ-producer Yuksek serves as the single's B-side. ParkerLab's Dusted remix appears on M83's We Own the Sky EP, released in 2009. "Graveyard Girl" is used in the 2010 film The Last Song.
