= DSVII =

Studio album by M83
- Released: 20 September 2019
- Recorded: 2017–2018
- Studio: Anthony Gonzalez's home studio (Los Angeles, California); Justin Meldal-Johnsen's home studio (Glendale, California)
- Genre: New-age
- Length: 56:40
- Label: Naïve; Mute
- Producer: Anthony Gonzalez; Justin Meldal-Johnsen; Joe Berry

M83 chronology
Junk (2016)	DSVII (2019)	Fantasy (2023)

Singles from DSVII
- 1. "Temple of Sorrow" Released: 5 September 2019; 2. "Lune de Fiel" Released: 13 September 2019; 3. "Feelings" Released: 19 September 2019

DSVII (short for Digital Shades Vol. II) is the eighth studio album by the French electronic music band M83, released on 20 September 2019 through Naïve and Mute Records. It is a sequel album to Digital Shades Vol. 1, released in 2007.

== Background ==
Anthony Gonzalez, member of the band, said that the album was inspired by playing 1980s video games while in Cap d'Antibes in France in 2017, calling the "old-school games" "naive and touching" as well as "simple and imperfect"; the musician also mentioned as an inspiration the soundtrack of the games, as well asscience fiction and fantasy films from the 1980s, and the synthesizer music of Suzanne Ciani, Mort Garson, Brian Eno and John Carpenter.

== Recording ==
Gonzalez recorded the album between 2017 and 2018 using only analog equipment, splitting sessions between both his Los Angeles studio and producer Justin Meldal-Johnsen's studio in Glendale, California. Band member Kaela Sinclair contributed vocals and arrangements.

== Critical reception ==
Professional ratings
Aggregate scores
Source	Rating
Metacritic	68/100
Review scores
Source	Rating
Pitchfork	7.4/10
Slant Magazine	3/5 stars

At Metacritic, which assigns a weighted average score out of 100 to reviews from critics, the album earned a score of 68, indicating "generally favorable reviews".

== Track listing ==
No.	Title	Length
1.	"Hell Riders"	6:47
2.	"A Bit of Sweetness"	3:36
3.	"Goodbye Captain Lee"	2:25
4.	"Colonies"	4:37
5.	"Meet the Friends"	3:02
6.	"Feelings"	3:55
7.	"A Word of Wisdom"	1:42
8.	"Lune de Fiel"	3:43
9.	"Jeux d'enfants"	2:08
10.	"A Taste of the Dusk"	3:51
11.	"Lunar Son"	2:45
12.	"Oh Yes You're There, Everyday"	5:05
13.	"Mirage"	2:46
14.	"Taifun Glory"	3:14
15.	"Temple of Sorrow"	7:04
Total length:		56:40

== Personnel ==
=== M83 ===
- Anthony Gonzalez – keyboard, synthesizer, guitar, bass guitar, vocals, producer, programming, arranging, mixing, drum machine, drum pads
- Joe Berry – piano, synthesizers, saxophones, flute, winds, pedal steel, accordion, co-production, string arrangements
- Kaela Sinclair – vocals, vocal arrangements

=== Additional musicians ===
- Justin Meldal-Johnsen – keyboard, synthesizer, guitar, production, programmer, arranging, mixing

== Charts ==
Chart performance for DSVII
Chart (2019)	Peak position
Belgian Albums (Ultratop Wallonia)	111
French Albums (SNEP)	98
Scottish Albums (Official Charts)	81
US Independent Albums (Billboard)	24
US Top Dance Albums (Billboard)	14
