= Digital Shades Vol. 1 =

Studio album by M83
- Released: September 3, 2007
- Recorded: 2006
- Genre: Ambient
- Length: 35:36
- Label: Mute
- Producers: Anthony Gonzalez; Antoine Gaillet

M83 chronology
Before the Dawn Heals Us (2005)	Digital Shades Vol. 1 (2007)	Saturdays = Youth (2008)

Professional ratings
Review scores
Source	Rating
AllMusic	3.5/5 stars
Pitchfork Media	7.0/10
Stylus Magazine	C−
Tiny Mix Tapes	2.5/5 stars

Digital Shades Vol. 1 is the fourth studio album by French electronic group M83. The album was released on September 3, 2007, and features only founding member Anthony Gonzalez. The album consists of tracks that are more of an ambient texture and quality; some songs have light vocals while the album is mostly instrumental. Some tracks even dip into drone music as well which differs vastly from Gonzalez's earlier explorations of dream pop and shoegaze guitar-influenced song structures.

A sequel to the album was released on September 20, 2019, titled DSVII.

== Track listing ==
All tracks are written by Anthony Gonzalez.

No.	Title	Length
1.	"Waves, Waves, Waves"	2:32
2.	"Coloring the Void"	3:29
3.	"Sister (Part I)"	2:16
4.	"Strong and Wasted"	1:58
5.	"My Own Strange Path"	3:49
6.	"Dancing Mountains"	5:07
7.	"Sister (Part II)"	2:23
8.	"By the Kiss"	4:03
9.	"Space Fertilizer"	2:00
10.	"The Highest Journey"	8:16

Digital-only bonus track
No.	Title	Length
11.	"Bruits de Train"	2:35

== Personnel ==
- Written, composed, and performed by Anthony Gonzalez.
- Mixed and mastered by Antoine Gaillet.
- Excerpt in track 8 from the movie soundtrack By the Kiss directed by Yann Gonzalez.
- Artwork and illustration by Laurent Fetis.
