= Kim & Jessie =

Single by M83

from the album Saturdays = Youth
- Released: 21 July 2008
- Recorded: Rockfield Studios, Wales
- Genre: Electropop; post-punk
- Length: 5:23
- Label: Mute (US); Virgin; EMI (Europe)
- Songwriters: Anthony Gonzalez; Yann Gonzalez; Morgan Kibby
- Producers: Ken Thomas (producer); Ewan Pearson; Anthony Gonzalez (co-producers)

M83 singles chronology
"Graveyard Girl" (2008)	"Kim & Jessie" (2008)	"We Own the Sky" (2008)

"Kim & Jessie" is a song by French electronic band M83. Written by Anthony and Yann Gonzalez with Morgan Kibby, it was released in July 2008 as the third single from M83's fifth studio album, Saturdays = Youth.

== Critical reception ==
"Kim & Jessie" ranked number five on Pitchfork's list of the top 100 songs of 2008. Pitchfork's Mark Pytlik said that "with its apocalyptic electric drum hits, keening synths, icily detached vocals, and volcanic chorus, 'Kim & Jessie' not only ranked as the album's best song, but also combined with the similarly convincing "Graveyard Girl" to make one of the year's most potent 1-2 punches." Paste's Jeff Leven called it the album's "clear standout" and "one of the best songs of 2008."

James Gwyther of Drowned in Sound wrote that "the processed vocals from Gonzalez and an overall air of nostalgia [...] combine to craft a delicious electro number." Stereogum's Brandon Stosuy compared the track to OMD, while Chuck Myers of Glide Magazine likened it to "hearing an alternate-universe version of the Psychedelic Furs, one where Richard Butler couldn't write memorable songs."

=== Accolades ===
Publication	Country	Accolade	Year	Rank
Pitchfork Media	US	Top 100 Tracks of 2008	2008	5
Rolling Stone	US	100 Best Singles of 2008	2008	85
Treble	US	Top 50 Songs of 2008	2008	6
The Village Voice	US	2008 Pazz & Jop	2008	29
Pitchfork Media	US	Top 500 Tracks of the 2000s	2009	256

== Music video ==
Released in July 2008, the music video for "Kim & Jessie" ranked number 47 on Pitchfork's list of the top 50 videos of the 2000s. The video, directed by Eva Husson, depicts two teenage roller skating girls who, at the end of the clip, are seen kissing male roller bladers. Rob Simonsen of The Portland Mercury noted the video "seems simple enough" but that "the dark undertones are inescapable." A Stereogum article stated that "whatever the first few minutes of the clip makes you assume about Kim & Jessie’s secret world, the ending will probably prove you wrong." Brandon Soderberg of Slant Magazine suggested the "make-out session [...] is an age and community acceptable transference for the characters' love for one another." Soderberg added that the ending "maintains M83's underlying sense of sadness and longing."

== Track listing ==
No.	Title	Writer(s)	Length
1.	"Kim & Jessie" (radio edit)	Anthony Gonzalez; Yann Gonzalez; Morgan Kibby	4:06
2.	"Kim & Jessie" (Data remix)	A. Gonzalez; Y. Gonzalez; Kibby	5:00
3.	"Kim & Jessie" (Montag remix)	A. Gonzalez; Y. Gonzalez; Kibby	5:00
4.	"Kim & Jessie" (album version)	A. Gonzalez; Y. Gonzalez; Kibby	5:23

== Other uses ==
The song appeared in the 2018 racing game Forza Horizon 4.
