= Before the Dawn Heals Us =

Studio album by M83
- Released: 24 January 2005
- Recorded: 2004
- Genres: Electronic; shoegaze; dream pop; ambient
- Length: 61:01
- Labels: Gooom; Naïve Records; Mute
- Producers: Anthony Gonzalez; Antoine Gaillet; Jean-Philippe Talaga

M83 chronology
Dead Cities, Red Seas & Lost Ghosts (2003)	Before the Dawn Heals Us (2005)	Digital Shades Vol. 1 (2007)

Singles from Before the Dawn Heals Us
- 1. "A Guitar and a Heart" / "Safe" Released: 22 November 2004; 2. "Don't Save Us from the Flames" Released: 7 February 2005; 3. "Teen Angst" Released: 6 May 2005

Professional ratings
Aggregate scores
Source	Rating
Metacritic	76/100
Review scores
Source	Rating
AllMusic	3.5/5 stars
Entertainment Weekly	A−
The Guardian	3/5 stars
NME	8/10
Pitchfork	8.6/10
Rolling Stone	3/5 stars
Uncut	4/5 stars

Before the Dawn Heals Us is the third studio album by the French electronic music group M83, released in January 2005 to positive reviews. The album was released on the Gooom label in Europe and on the Mute label in the United States. It was the first album from M83 following the departure of founding member Nicolas Fromageau. Before the Dawn Heals Us was also chosen as one of Amazon.com's Top 100 Editor's Picks of 2005.

The track "Moonchild" was featured in the television show Top Gear in episode 6 of series 6 in 2005. The track "Teen Angst" was featured in trailers to the 2006 film A Scanner Darkly. The track "Lower Your Eyelids to Die with the Sun" was featured in the 2008 documentary Britney: For the Record, and also featured as the backing track for the intro sequence to Lakai’s 2007 full-length skateboarding film Fully Flared. The track "I Guess I'm Floating" was featured in the movie Broken English. It was also featured in and on the soundtrack of the movie Like Crazy. The track "Asterisk" was used in a 2011 Red Bull advertisement featuring snowboarder Travis Rice. It was also used in Gabe Morford and Mike Martin's 2006 urban track bike riding manifesto MASH SF.

The city skyline featured on the album cover is Bangkok, Thailand.

As of 2005, the album has shipped over 30,000 copies to record stores in the United States.

== Track listing ==
Before the Dawn Heals Us track listing
No.	Title	Writer(s)	Length
1.	"Moonchild"	Anthony Gonzalez; Yann Gonzalez	4:38
2.	"Don't Save Us from the Flames"	A. Gonzalez; Y. Gonzalez	4:15
3.	"In the Cold I'm Standing"	A. Gonzalez	4:08
4.	"Farewell / Goodbye"	A. Gonzalez; Y. Gonzalez	5:32
5.	"Fields, Shorelines and Hunters"	A. Gonzalez	2:30
6.	"*"	A. Gonzalez	2:44
7.	"I Guess I'm Floating"	A. Gonzalez	1:57
8.	"Teen Angst"	A. Gonzalez; Y. Gonzalez	5:03
9.	"Can't Stop"	A. Gonzalez	2:20
10.	"Safe"	A. Gonzalez; Y. Gonzalez	4:53
11.	"Let Men Burn Stars"	A. Gonzalez	1:56
12.	"Car Chase Terror!"	A. Gonzalez; Y. Gonzalez	3:51
13.	"Slight Night Shiver"	A. Gonzalez	2:04
14.	"A Guitar and a Heart"	A. Gonzalez; Antoine Gaillet	4:46
15.	"Lower Your Eyelids to Die with the Sun"	A. Gonzalez	10:37

== Singles ==
- "A Guitar and a Heart"/"Safe" (22 November 2004)
  1. "A Guitar and a Heart"
  2. "Safe"
- "Don't Save Us from the Flames" (7 February 2005)
  1. "Don't Save Us from the Flames"
  2. "Until the Night Is Over"
  3. "Don't Save Us from the Flames" (Superpitcher Remix)
  4. "Don't Save Us from the Flames" (Boom Bip Remix)
- "Teen Angst" (6 May 2005)
  1. "Teen Angst"
  2. "Teen Angst" (Montag Remix)

== Charts ==
Chart performance for Before the Dawn Heals Us
Chart (2005)	Peak position
French Albums (SNEP)	103
UK Albums (OCC)	166

== Release history ==
Release history and formats for Before the Dawn Heals Us
Country	Date	Label	Format	Catalogue #
Europe	24 January 2005	Gooom; Labels	CD	Gooom 035CD; 7243 5 63862 2 8
United States	25 January 2005	Mute	CD	9281-2
United States	13 January 2009	Mute	2xLP + CD	9281-1 + 9281-2
Japan	14 September 2005	Toshiba EMI	CD (one bonus track)	TOCP-66462
