= Cyann & Ben =

- Origin: Paris, France
- Genres: Post-rock, dream pop
- Years active: 2001–2008
- Labels: Gooom Disques, Ever Records, Locust Music
- Spinoffs: Yeti Lane
- Past members: Charlie Boyer; Loïc Carron; Cyann; Ben Pleng

Cyann & Ben were a Parisian experimental rock band, formed in 2001. They released three albums and were signed to Gooom Disques before signing to Ever Records. When Cyann left the group in early 2009 to pursue a solo career, the remaining members of the band started a new musical project called Yeti Lane.

== Discography ==
=== Albums ===
- Spring (2003, France: Gooom Disques; US: Locust Music)
- Happy Like an Autumn Tree (2004, Gooom Disques)
- Sweet Beliefs (2006, Ever Records)

=== EPs ===
- Cyann & Ben (2001, Gooom Disques)
- Sunny Morning (2006, Ever Records)

=== Singles ===
- "Words" (2006, Ever Records)
