= M83 (album) =

Studio album by M83
- Released: 18 April 2001
- Recorded: Autumn 2000; "Slowly" recorded Winter 2002
- Studio: Echotone
- Genre: Shoegaze; electronica; ambient
- Length: 66:22; 70:23 (2005 remastered)
- Label: Gooom
- Producer: M83; Morgan Daguenet

M83 chronology
M83 (2001)	Dead Cities, Red Seas & Lost Ghosts (2003)

Singles from M83
- 1. "Slowly/Sitting" Released: 2002

Professional ratings
Review scores
Source	Rating
AllMusic	4/5 stars
Pitchfork	6.5/10
PopMatters	6/10

M83 is the debut studio album by French electronic music band M83, released on 18 April 2001 on Gooom. The album was reissued on 6 September 2005 on Mute Records for its North American release, and is thus sometimes referred to as 0905.

Produced by both M83 and Morgan Daguenet, the album is predominantly instrumental, with dialogue samples from various films and television programmes appearing across the songs. The track titles, if read sequentially, form a short story.

== Background and recording ==
Recorded as a duo by founding members, Anthony Gonzalez and Nicolas Fromageau, the album was recorded at Echotone, in the Autumn of 2000, with co-producer Morgan Daguenet. The track "Slowly", included on the album's 2005 reissue, was recorded two years later at the same location.

== Track listing ==
All tracks are written by M83

No.	Title	Length
1.	"Last Saturday"	0:58
2.	"Night"	5:47
3.	"At the Party"	1:01
4.	"Kelly"	4:27
5.	"Sitting"	3:03
6.	"Facing That"	7:35
7.	"Violet Tree"	4:53
8.	"Staring at Me"	1:37
9.	"I'm Getting Closer"	5:19
10.	"She Stands Up"	5:42
11.	"Caresses"	6:31
12.	"Slowly" (bonus track on 2005 reissue only)	4:58
13.	"My Face"	1:39
14.	"I'm Happy, She Said" (ends at 10:10; contains a hidden track at 15:10)	17:52
Total length:		66:22

== Notes ==
- Original copies of the album contain a version of "Night" that samples German dialogue from the film Nosferatu the Vampyre at the beginning of the song. The version on the 2005 Mute re-release does not feature the sample and thus is slightly over a minute shorter (4:44), bringing the total length of the album to 70:23.
- The sampled dialogue in "Facing That" is from the film It Conquered the World.
- The first few seconds of "Violet Tree" features a sample of audio from episode two of Serial Experiments Lain. A few seconds of opening dialogue from the same episode can be heard at the beginning of "Caresses".
- The sampled dialogue at the beginning of "I'm Getting Closer" is from the film I Was a Teenage Werewolf.
- The sampled dialogue in "I'm Getting Closer" is from the film Buffalo '66 and is played in reverse.
- The sampled dialogue in "She Stands Up" is from the film Paris, Texas.
- The sampled dialogue in "Caresses" is from the film Mark of the Vampire.
- On the last track, at 15:10, there is a hidden track, which consists of several minutes of static followed by an outro.
- Track names can be read in order, describing an event at a party.

== Personnel ==
M83

- Anthony Gonzalez
- Nicolas Fromageau

Recording personnel

- M83 − production, mixing
- Morgan Daguenet − production, mixing

Artwork

- Stylophone − design
