= M83 (band) =

French electronic music group

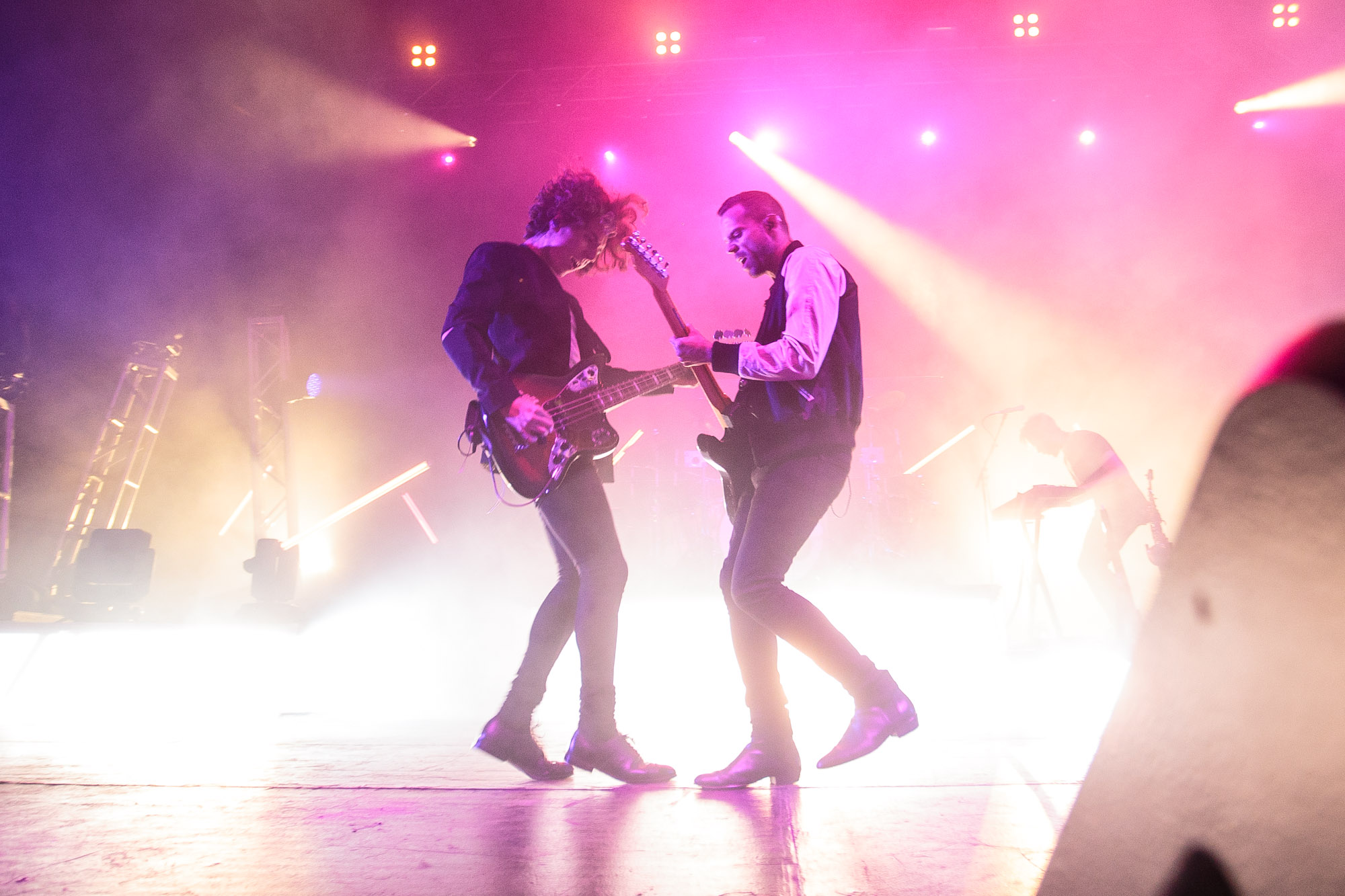
- M83 at Boston's Blue Hills Bank Pavilion 2016

Background information
- Origin: Antibes, France
- Genres: Synth-pop; shoegaze; dream pop; post-rock; ambient; electronic rock; alternative rock
- Years active: 1999–present
- Labels: Naïve; Mute; Virgin; Gooom
- Members: Anthony Gonzalez; Joe Berry; Benoît de Villeneuve; Clément Libes
- Past members: Loïc Maurin; Kaela Sinclair; Jordan Lawlor; Morgan Kibby; Ian Young; Nicolas Fromageau; Pierre-Marie Maulini
- Website: ilovem83.com

M83 (French: [ɛm katʁ(ə)vɛ̃tʁwɑ]) is a French electronic music group formed in Antibes in 1999. Initially a duo of multi-instrumentalists Nicolas Fromageau and Anthony Gonzalez, Fromageau parted ways shortly after touring for their second album Dead Cities, Red Seas & Lost Ghosts. Gonzalez remains the sole constant member of the project, as the primary songwriter and lead vocalist. (Note: While primarily a solo project by Anthony Gonzalez, the liner notes of Saturdays = Youth (2008) credit Loïc Maurin and Morgan Kibby as being part of M83. Gonzalez has also stated: "For me, M83 is more of a collective than a solo project.")

The band has released nine studio albums, including the Grammy Award-nominated Hurry Up, We're Dreaming, in addition to two soundtracks. Gonzalez records primarily on his own, with numerous guest musicians. The band is signed to Mute Records and found breakout success in 2011 with "Midnight City", Hurry Up, We're Dreaming's lead single. Their sound has been described as dream pop, new wave, shoegaze, as well as ambient.

== Early life ==
Anthony Gerard Gonzalez (born 13 March 1980) grew up in Antibes, France, together with his brother Yann. His family had a great interest in football and Gonzalez had trials with AS Cannes, while his maternal grandfather is the French international Laurent Robuschi. At the age of 14 he was injured, and turned to music instead when his parents bought him a guitar. He developed his interest in music and American culture at secondary school. With Fromageau, he formed a post-rock group called My Violent Wish.

== Career ==
=== 2001–2005: First recordings ===
M83, the band's namesake

At 17, Gonzalez bought a synth to record a demo, which he sent to a number of French labels. When Paris-based Gooom Records seemed interested, he recruited Nicolas Fromageau to "help me because I didn't feel like I had the shoulders to carry the project on my own". They decided to name their band M83, after the galaxy of that name.

In spring 2001, while Gonzalez was still in college, M83 released its self-titled debut album recorded on an 8-track. It did not attract much attention outside Europe until September 2005, when Mute Records reissued it for worldwide release. M83's second album, Dead Cities, Red Seas & Lost Ghosts, followed in spring 2003 (summer 2004 in North America) to widespread critical acclaim. After worldwide touring for Dead Cities resumed, Fromageau left the band; he later formed the band Team Ghost in 2009.

Gonzalez returned to the studio to record the group's third studio album, Before the Dawn Heals Us, released in January 2005. In 2016, the song "Lower Your Eyelids to Die with the Sun" was featured in the trailer for the film A Monster Calls starring Felicity Jones and Sigourney Weaver. Later in 2005, M83 provided a remix of "The Pioneers" by Bloc Party, which was also included on Bloc Party's remix album Silent Alarm Remixed. M83 also remixed Placebo's "Protège-Moi", Goldfrapp's "Black Cherry", Depeche Mode's "Suffer Well", Van She's "Kelly", and The Bumblebeez's "Vila Attack". Similarly, M83's songs have been remixed by Gooom labelmates Montag and Cyann & Ben.

=== 2006–2009: Digital Shades Vol. 1 and Saturdays = Youth ===
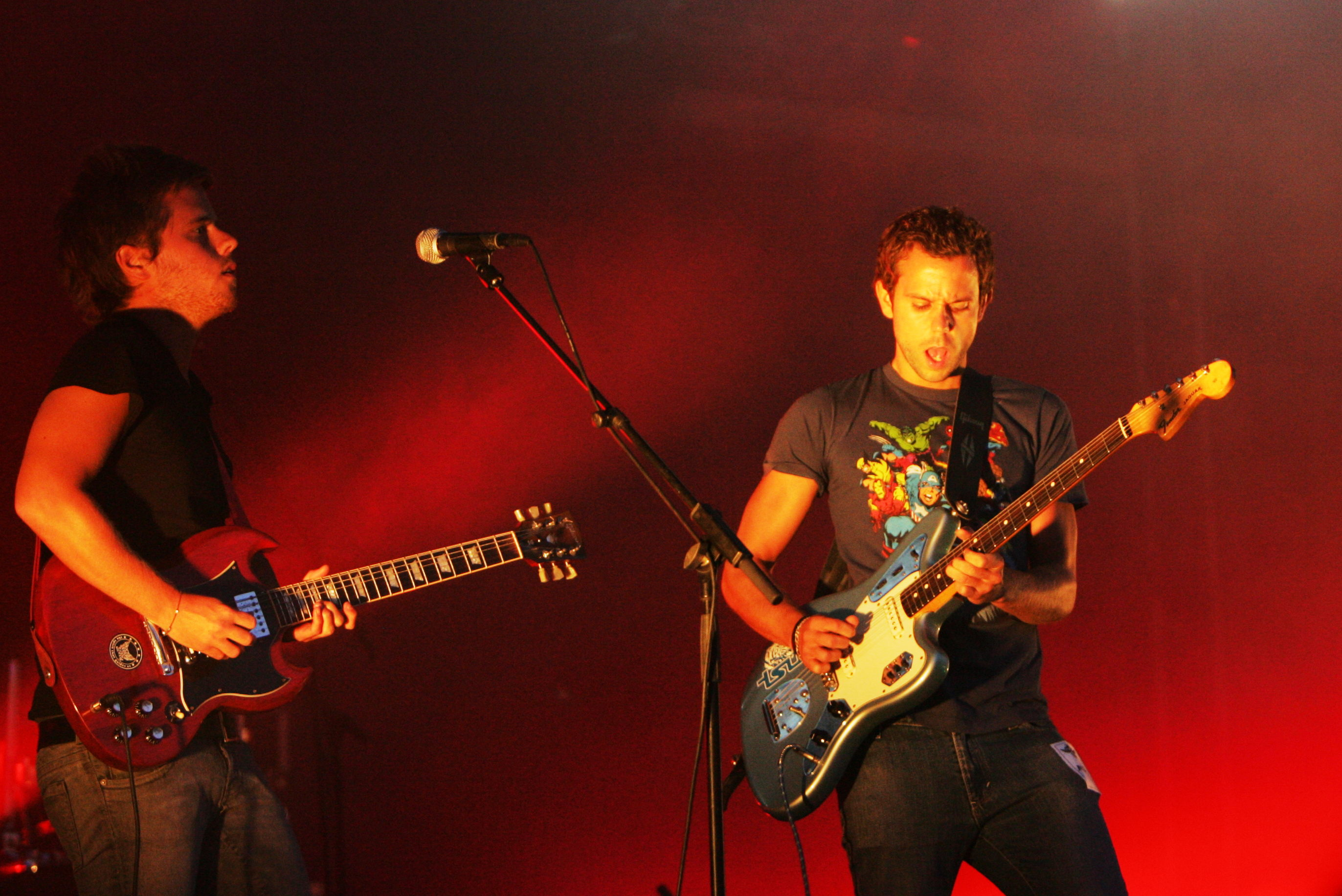
Maulini and Gonzalez from M83 performing at the Pully For Noise festival in 2008

In 2006, after the Before the Dawn Heals Us tour of the US, Anthony Gonzalez continued to explore a musical direction already heard on earlier M83 tracks and began writing and recording a collection of ambient works. The album was recorded primarily at his home studio with the assistance of Antoine Gaillet. The resulting project was called Digital Shades Vol. 1, and was released in September 2007 with a sleeve illustrated by Laurent Fetis (known for his work with DJ Hell, Beck, and Tahiti 80). It is intended to be part of an ongoing series of ambient works.

Saturdays = Youth, M83's fifth studio album, was released in April 2008. It was recorded with Ken Thomas (known for his work with Sigur Rós, The Sugarcubes, Boys in a Band, Cocteau Twins, and Suede), Ewan Pearson (who has also produced for Tracey Thorn, The Rapture and Ladytron) and Morgan Kibby (of The Romanovs). The album features a more focused approach to song structure and form, and Gonzalez stated that the main influence of the album came from music of the 1980s: "I think that '80s music is such a brilliant period for music history. It was the occasion for me to do a tribute to this '80s music, but [it was] also a tribute to my teenage years because the main theme of the album is being a teenager, and being a teenager means a lot to me." Four singles were released from the album: "Couleurs" in February 2008, "Graveyard Girl" in April, "Kim & Jessie" in July, and "We Own the Sky" in December. Redbull and Snowboarder Travis Rice used "We Own the Sky" as the opening song in the 2008 snowboard film That's It That's All. M83 also appeared on a limited edition split 7-inch single with Maps in 2008; M83 remixed Maps' "To the Sky", while Maps provided a remix of M83's "We Own the Sky".

In December 2008, M83 supported Kings of Leon on its UK tour. In January and February 2009, M83 supported The Killers across United States tour dates and toured with Depeche Mode on its Tour of the Universe in Italy, Germany, and France. In July, M83 appeared at the Fuji Rock Festival in Japan. In July 2009, M83 appeared at the Wexner Center in Columbus, Ohio. Gonzalez, unprovoked, physically assaulted an elderly security guard when Gonzalez attempted to have members of the crowd join him on an unreinforced stage platform. The band later apologized to its fans for the incident. In 2010, on the eve of turning 30, Gonzalez moved to Los Angeles.

=== 2010–2015: Hurry Up, We're Dreaming, Oblivion and commercial success ===
In Spring 2010, M83 composed the score of French director Gilles Marchand's film Black Heaven. On 5 July 2010, the Black Heaven Soundtrack was released, which included two new songs by M83 called "Black Hole" and "Marion's Theme", along with five tracks from his back catalog. The soundtrack also includes songs from the score by Emmanuel D'Orlando, Moon Dailly and John & Jehn. However, his feelings towards the record were largely negative, leaving him depressed.

In 2011, Gonzalez started working on a new batch of songs for an album slated for release later in the year. He described the tracks as darker and "very, very, very epic". Speaking with Spin, he said of the new album "It's a double album. It's mainly about dreams, how every one is different, how you dream differently when you're a kid, a teenager, or an adult. I'm really proud of it. If you're doing a very long album, all the songs need to be different and I think I've done that with this one." He recorded again with Morgan Kibby as well as others, including Medicine's mastermind Brad Laner, Nine Inch Nails bassist Justin Meldal-Johnsen and Zola Jesus.

Hurry Up, We're Dreaming is Gonzalez's first double album, something he had dreamed of making ever since hearing The Smashing Pumpkins' Mellon Collie and the Infinite Sadness. "I wanted to make a very eclectic album but also something not too long. Making a double album was a dream of mine for a long, long time and I felt ready to make this move," he explains. Discussing the sound and process of creating this album, Gonzalez says it was "written like a soundtrack to an imaginary movie with different ambiances, different atmospheres, different tempos, different orchestrations and different instrumentation.... When I make an album it's always about nostalgia, melancholy in the past and memories."

On 19 July 2011, the breakthrough single "Midnight City", the first from Hurry Up, We're Dreaming, was released for streaming and free download on the band's official website. Beginning in October, they toured North America and Europe to promote the album; Active Child supported the US leg of the tour. The album placed 3rd in Pitchfork's Top 50 Albums of 2011 list; the single "Midnight City" was placed 1st on the Top 100 Tracks list. On 26 January 2012, M83 came in at number 5 on the Triple J Hottest 100 with the single "Midnight City". The track received further exposure in 2013 as the remixed soundtrack to the Gucci Premier fragrance television advert featuring Blake Lively. It was also used in the 2013 film Warm Bodies.

On 28 June 2012, it was announced that M83 would compose the soundtrack for the 2013 movie Oblivion, directed by Joseph Kosinski and starring Tom Cruise. The score was co-written with Joseph Trapanese. The soundtrack album was released on 9 April 2013 by Back Lot Music featuring Susanne Sundfør on vocals. On 26 February 2014, a new song titled "I Need You" was included on the Divergent soundtrack. The song "Wait" was featured in the 2014 film The Fault in our Stars. It was also featured in the "Perception" episode of Revenge in 2012, "The Backup Dan" episode of Gossip Girl in 2012, "Imperfect Circles" episode of Under the Dome in 2013 and "The World Has Turned and Left Me Here" episode of The Vampire Diaries in 2014. More recently, "Wait" was used as part of the documentary "The Day We Walked On The Moon" commemorating the 50th anniversary of the first Moon landing and screened in the UK by ITV in July 2019 and in the same year, in a feature film titled Five Feet Apart. Also from Hurry Up, We're Dreaming, two tracks, "Another Wave from You" and "Outro", featured in the 2014 remake of The Gambler. In 2015 and 2016, British-Franco-Canadian drama Versailles, uses "Outro" as the theme title. "Outro" was also featured in the popular snowboarding documentary The Art of Flight, in the reveal trailer for the games "Paragon" and "Kerbal Space Program 2", in a Mazda commercial entitled "Feel Alive" in 2018, and as the final song in the finale of both the USA Networks TV show Mr. Robot and Fox TV show Enlisted. Moonchild was featured in Top Gear's McLaren Mercedes SLR Oslo challenge. The Italian-French film Suburra from 2015 features music by M83 extensively.

In August 2014, the first three albums produced by the band were re-released by Mute Records with additional material available separately for download. Gonzalez explained the reissues by noting that physical copies of the albums were hard to find and sold for "a ridiculous amount of money". On 2 March 2015, M83, with indie pop group Haim, released the song "Holes in the Sky" from The Divergent Series: Insurgent soundtrack. He also participated in Jean-Michel Jarre's album Electronica 1: The Time Machine.

=== 2016–2025: Junk, Volta, Tour, DSVII, and Fantasy ===
On 1 March 2016, M83's seventh studio album Junk was announced along with its lead single, "Do It, Try It". The album was released on 8 April 2016. The band then embarked on a tour across North America and Europe during the first half of 2016. On 5 December 2016, it was announced that Gonzalez of M83 would be the composer and musical director for Cirque du Soleil's touring show, Volta.

In July 2019, Gonzalez announced M83's eighth studio album, DSVII (standing for Digital Shades, Vol. II). It was released on 20 September 2019. In December 2021, Gonzalez announced a re-release of Hurry Up We're Dreaming for its 10th anniversary. On 10 January 2023, M83 released the single "Oceans Niagara", and released their ninth studio album, Fantasy, on 17 March 2023. A tour of North America in support of the album followed.

On 16 April 2025, Anthony Gonzalez announced the release of the new M83 soundtrack album A Necessary Escape for the film Dakar Chronicles, a documentary directed by the French actor and screenwriter Jalil Lespert.

=== 2026–present: I Wrote You A Letter ===
On 22 July 2026, Gonzalez announced M83's tenth studio album I Wrote You a Letter. The album was released on 25 September 2026.

== Musical style ==
M83's music has been described as synth-pop, shoegaze, dream pop, post-rock, ambient, electronic rock and alternative rock.

The band's aesthetic is characterized by dense guitar and synthesizer layering, extensive use of reverb effects, and lyrics often sung softly in a dream pop style. Gonzalez has been inspired by cultural and musical facets of the 1980s, and his songs have been described as "adult-scripted teen dreams". Inspiration for his music includes bands such as My Bloody Valentine, Smashing Pumpkins, Depeche Mode, OMD, Jean-Michel Jarre, and Tangerine Dream.

== Members ==
=== Current members ===
- Anthony Gonzalez – lead vocals, synthesizers, keyboards, guitars, piano, bass, drums, percussion, programming, arrangement, mixer, production (1999–present)

=== Former members ===
- Nicolas Fromageau – keyboards, synthesizers, arrangement, programming, mixer, production (1999–2004)
- Loïc Maurin – drums, percussion, guitar, bass, keyboards (2004–2023)
- Morgan Kibby – vocals, piano, keyboards (2008–2015)

=== Current live members ===
- Kaela Sinclair – keyboards, vocals (2016–present)
- Joe Berry – piano, synthesizers, EWI, saxophone, woodwinds, vocals (2016–present)
- Théophile Antolinos – guitars (2023–present)
- Julien Aoufi – drums (2023–present)
- Clément Libes – bass, keyboards, violin, viola, guitar, drum programming (2023–present)
- Benoît de Villeneuve – keyboards, programming, guitar, vocals (2023–present)

=== Former live members ===
- Orderic Cousin – bass (2003)
- Alexandre Fogliani – drums (2003)
- Ludovic Morillon – drums (2004)
- Stéphane Bouvier – bass (2004–2005)
- Philippe Thiphaine – guitars (2004–2005)
- Pierre-Marie Maulini – guitars, backing vocals, keyboards, percussion (2008–2009)
- Jonathan Bates – guitar, bass (2009)
- Ian Young – saxophone (2011–2016)
- Jordan Lawlor – guitars, vocals, multi-instrumentalist (2011–2016)

== Discography ==
- M83 (2001)
- Dead Cities, Red Seas & Lost Ghosts (2003)
- Before the Dawn Heals Us (2005)
- Digital Shades Vol. 1 (2007)
- Saturdays = Youth (2008)
- Hurry Up, We're Dreaming (2011)
- Junk (2016)
- DSVII (2019)
- Fantasy (2023)
- I Wrote You a Letter (2026)

== Awards and nominations ==
Year	Awards	Work	Category	Result
2005	PLUG Awards	Dead Cities, Red Seas & Lost Ghosts	Electronic/Dance Album Of The Year	Nominated
2006	PLUG Awards	Before the Dawn Heals Us	Electronic/Dance Album Of The Year	Won
2008	Rober Awards Music Prize	Themselves	Best European Artist	Won
2011	Rober Awards Music Prize	"Midnight City"	Best Music Video	Nominated
2012	mtvU Woodie Awards	"Midnight City"	Best Video Woodie	Nominated
2012	UK Music Video Awards	"Midnight City"	Best Alternative Video – International	Nominated
2013	UK Music Video Awards	"Wait"	Best Alternative Video – International	Nominated
2013	Grammy Awards	Hurry Up, We're Dreaming	Best Alternative Music Album	Nominated
2016	Sweden GAFFA Awards	Themselves	Best International Group	Won
2022	UK Music Video Awards	"My Tears Are Becoming a Sea"	Best Color Grading in a Video	Nominated

== See also ==
- List of ambient music artists
