= Gooom Disques =

French record label

- Founded: 1997
- Founder: Jean-Philippe Talaga
- Status: Dormant (since 2005)
- Genre: Electronic music
- Country of origin: France
- Location: Paris

Gooom Disques, or Gooom, was an electronic music record label based in Paris, France. Gooom was founded by Jean-Philippe Talaga in 1997 after interviewing the British post-rock act Stereolab for his fanzine and both parties agreeing to release music. As a result, the first release on the label was a split EP by Stereolab and Fugu.

The label gained exposure outside France with the popularity of the artist M83. Since 2005 the label is dormant.

== Artists ==
- Abstrackt Keal Agram
- Anne Laplantine
- Cosmodrome
- Cyann & Ben
- Gel: Dorine-Muraille
- KG
- Kids Indestructible
- M83
- Mils
- Montag
- Purple Confusion
