= The Death Set =

Experimental music band

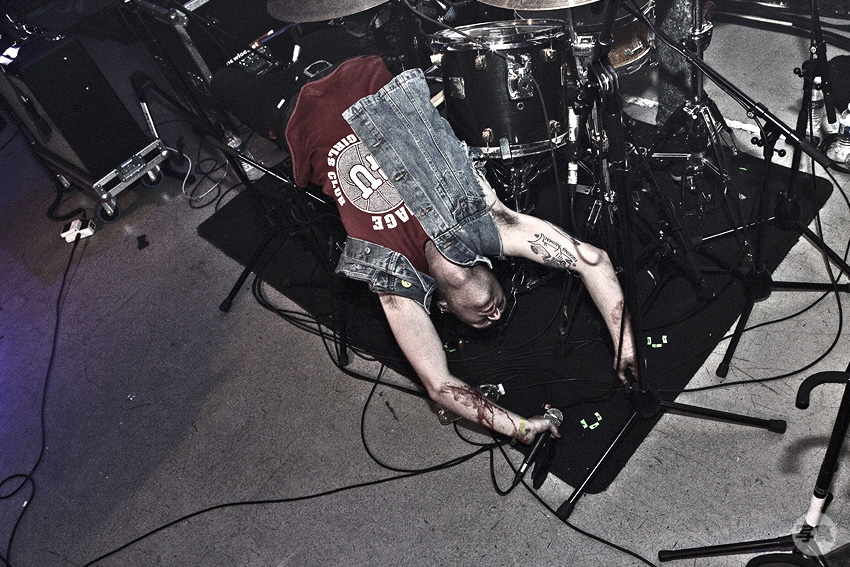

Background information
- Origin: Gold Coast, Queensland, Australia
- Genres: Punk rock, art punk, electronica
- Years active: 2005–present
- Labels: Dim Mak Records, Ninja Tune (Counter), Modular Recordings UK, Morphius
- Members: Johnny Siera; Daniel Walker
- Past members: Beau Velasco (deceased); Jahphet Landis; Peter O' Connell; Matt Papich; William Broussard
- Website: thedeathset.com

The Death Set (also typeset as TheDeathSet or The DeathSet) is an experimental music band with roots in punk rock, sometimes referred to as art punk. The band formed in 2005 in Sydney. Six months after its inception, the band moved to the United States, living in Baltimore, Philadelphia and Brooklyn, where the band found an audience for its style of experimental, cross genre, punk rock. Moving after less than two years in each city the band has been nomadic, yet thrived in each base. All members now currently live in Brooklyn, New York. The band fuses punk rock sound and energy, electronic music production and hip hop sampling into their recordings. Their live shows are high energy events, inciting crowd chaos and sometimes played at crowd level with the audience surrounding the band.

The band was originally formed with Johnny Siera and Beau Velasco sharing vocal, guitar and production duties. The current lineup features Siera in the same role, Daniel Walker on guitar, vocals and production and William Brousaard on drums.

== History ==
First meeting in their home town of the Gold Coast of Australia, Johnny Siera met Beau Velasco at a show where Velasco's band "Black Panda" was performing. Drawn to the energy of the show, Siera contacted Velasco and was soon asked to join for a tour of the East Coast of Australia with Brooklyn band Japanther. Inspired by the tour, the two decided to move to Sydney and focus on the band as a two-piece group, renaming themselves The Death Set.

Velasco and Siera converted a central Sydney warehouse space into a makeshift recording studio and wrote and recorded what would become their debut EP, to. Having a sound both electronic as well as rock, their first shows around Sydney would be at the electronic night "Bang Gang", the rock night "Gimme Gimme Gimme", and an art opening for pop artist Ben Frost.

The pair was contacted by Baltimore label Morphius Records to release their first EP. Subsequently, the band moved to Brooklyn, then Baltimore, bought an old work van and toured The United States constantly.

=== Signing to Counter Records (Ninja Tune) & Worldwide LP ===
In January 2008, the band signed to Counter Records, the rock offshoot of the U.K. label Ninja Tune. The subsequent full-length album Worldwide was released on 25 March 2008 to very positive reviews and widely praised in the alternative music press including an Artrocker Magazine cover and album of the month and Allmusic's album pick.

After their performance at the 2008 Reading and Leeds Festival, the UK music magazine NME called them the No. 1 biggest hope of the future.

=== Death of Beau Velasco ===
On 27 September 2009 Beau Velasco, Death Set guitarist and co-songwriter, was found dead in his studio in New York City. Although completely devastated, the band decided to keep going as they believed Velasco would have wanted them to continue. Many songs on the album "Michel Poiccard" are meant as a celebration of Velasco's life and influence on the band.

=== Michel Poiccard LP ===
The Death Set released their second LP titled "Michel Poiccard" on 15 March 2011 again on Counter Records / Ninja Tune. Produced by XXXChange and including collaborations with Diplo and Spankrock. BBC describes Michel Poiccard as "full-tilt, power-pop catharsis, ecstatic blaze-of-glory euphoria and notes of blissed-out poignancy... Producer XXXChange has helped broaden the band's range from tin pot to wide screen". The album mixes influences of early punk with hip-hop and electronic elements often compared to early Beastie Boys marked with their own distinctive adrenaline twin guitar driven dynamic. Baltimore City Paper describes Michel Poiccard as "the best thing the Death Set's ever done". The album was praised by many critics and included in their best of 2011 album lists.

=== King Babies EP and hiatus ===
In 2013 the band signed to Dim Mak Records for a four track EP entitled King Babies. Released in January 2014 the EP marked a return to the more uptempo punk stylings of their earlier EP's. After this, the group took a seven-year hiatus from recording and releasing music.

=== Return and How to Tune a Parrot ===
In August 2021, The Death Set released their first single in seven years, "Elephant", from their new album How to Tune a Parrot, recorded before the COVID-19 pandemic by the now-duo of Siera and Walker. After three more singles, "No Where Is Here", "Set for Death", and "Fall Down", How to Tune a Parrot was released September 8, 2021, through Cobraside and Behemoth Records. Tinnitist called it “A mighty mish-mash of high-voltage lunacy”. The blog That’s Good Enough For Me called it “Your fifth double espresso in audio form”. American Songwriter called it “An explosive mini-adventure with all the ups, downs, struggles and triumphs of a DIY punk tour”. The band toured the record with punk legends D.O.A. (band) across the West coast of America in April 2022.

=== Touring ===
The band has played over 600 live performances in Australia, the United States, Canada, the United Kingdom, Japan, Europe, Scandinavia, Puerto Rico and Mexico including spots at the Fuji Rock Festival in Japan, the Reading / Leeds Festivals, Secret Garden and Love Box Festivals in the United Kingdom, Dour Festival in Belgium, Oya Festival in Norway, North by Northeast music conference in Canada, Pohoda Festival in Slovakia, Pantiero, Cabaret Vert, Marsatac and Le Grand Souk Festivals in France, Festival Nrmal in Mexico, Falls Festival in Australia and five years showcasing at the South by Southwest music conference in Austin, Texas. Live, the band is also known for its use of hip hop, Baltimore club and rock music samples played in between their original songs. In the end of 2011, they performed as support band for the German punk rock band Beatsteaks which included their Berlin show at Max Schmeling Halle to 10000+ fans.

== In popular culture ==
The Death Set songs have been featured in Google Chrome's commercial including plays during the 2012 Super Bowl; on TV shows Broad City, Workaholics, Killjoys, 24 (TV Series), How To Make It In America and Degrassi Junior High; in films V/H/S and V/H/S/2; video games NBA 2K12, Sunset Overdrive, Gran Turismo 6, and Onrush; Red Bull's mountain biking video Red Bull Rampage, and a remix in a Ministry of Sound compilation. The music video for "They Come to Get Us" won "Best Alternative Video" at the 2012 UK Music Awards.

== Discography ==
=== Albums ===
- Worldwide (Counter / Ninja Tune, 25 March 2008)
- Rad Warehouses to Bad Neighborhoods (collection of two initial EPs + remixes) (Counter / Ninja Tune, 24 March 2009)
- Michel Poiccard (Counter / Ninja Tune, 15 March 2011)
- How to Tune a Parrot (NIW (Japan), This Charming Man (EU), Cobraside/Behemoth (US), 10 September 2021)

=== Mixtapes ===
- Artificially Sweetened (Mishka NYC, 2010)
- Sugar High (2021)

=== EPs and singles ===
- To EP (self-released)
- To EP (RabbitFoot, 2005)
- 7-inch split with Best Fwends (The Arm/VLXO, 2005)
- "Intermission"/"Negative Thinking" (Modular, 2006)
- Rad Warehouses Bad Neighborhoods EP (RabbitFoot, 2007)
- Limitations Can Make You Creative double EP (Every Conversation/We Are Busy Bodies, 2007)
- MFDS EP (Counter, 2008)
- "Around the World"/"Heard It All Before" 7-inch (Counter, 2008)
- "Around the World" UK 7-inch (Counter, 2008)
- One Inch Badge split 7-inch with Best Fwends, Knife Hyts and Lovvers (O.I.B., 2008)
- "Slap Slap Slap Pound Up Down Snap" (Counter, 2011)
- "We Are Going Anywhere Man" (Counter, 2011)
- "Can You Seen Straight?" (Counter, 2011)
- "King Babies" (Dim Mak, 2014)
- Elephant (2021)
- No Where Is Here (2021)

=== Official remixes of The Death Set ===
- Hawnay Troof Remix of "Listen to This Collision" - Free Download at www.thedeathset.com (2007)
- The Death Set Remix 12-inch - Remixes by G.L.O.V.E.S., Bonde do Rolê, Treasure Fingers and The Bumblebeez (Bang Gang 12 Inches, 2008)
- Bonde do Rolê Remix of "Distressed" - Off the EP Rad Warehouses Bad Neighborhoods EP (RabbitFoot, 2007) & * Rad Warehouses to Bad Neighborhoods (Counter / Ninja Tune, 24 March 2009)
- Dan Deacon Remix of "Impossible" - Off the EP Rad Warehouses Bad Neighborhoods EP (RabbitFoot, 2007) & * Rad Warehouses to Bad Neighborhoods (Counter / Ninja Tune, 24 March 2009)
- Best Fwends Remix of "Negative Thinking" - Off the Album * Rad Warehouses to Bad Neighborhoods (Counter / Ninja Tune, 24 March 2009)
- Etan Positive Outlook Remix of "Impossible" - Off the Album * Rad Warehouses to Bad Neighborhoods (Counter / Ninja Tune, 24 March 2009)
- NinjaSonik Remix of "Negative Thinking" - Off the Album * Rad Warehouses to Bad Neighborhoods (Counter / Ninja Tune, 24 March 2009)
- Best Fwends Remix of "Slap Slap Slap Pound Up Down Snap" - - Free Download at www.thedeathset.com (2011)
- Nadastrom Remix of "Can You Seen Straight" - Off the single * Can You Seen Straight? (Counter, 2011)
- Designer Drugs Remix of "They Come To Get Us" - Off the single * Can You Seen Straight? (Counter, 2011)
- Nadus & Steel Remix of "They Come To Get Us" - Off the single * Can You Seen Straight? (Counter, 2011)
- The PartySquad Remix of "Yo David Chase, You P.O.V. Shot me in the Head" - (The PartySquad, 2012)

=== Remixes by The Death Set ===
- Best Fwends "Aaww Some" (Moshi Moshi, 2007)
- Robots in Disguise "Sex Has Made Me Stupid" (President, 2007)
- Nicky Van She and Dangerous Dan remix of Daft Punk "Around the World" remix (Every Conversation, 2008)
- Little Boots "New in Town", (Elektra, 5 Jan 2009)
- Daedelus "Fair Weathered Friends" Punk and Electro remixes (Ninja Tune, 2008) & * Rad Warehouses to Bad Neighborhoods (Counter / Ninja Tune, 24 March 2009)
- Hawnay Troof "Said Once", The Death Set Vs. ZAP! POW! DIE! remix (2009)
- Adam Freeland "Borderline - Cover", (Marine Parade, 2009)
- Robots in Disguise "Chains", The Death Set Club Remix (President, 2011)
- The Cure "Grinding Halt", The Death Set (Counter / Ninja Tune, 4 April 2011)
- The Death Set Club Remix of They Come To Get Us - Off the single * Can You Seen Straight? (Counter, 2011)
- Spank Rock "#1 Hit" (Scion, 2011)
- DZ Deathrays "The Mess Up", (I OH YOU, 2011)
- Drop the Lime "Darkness", (Ultra, 2012)

=== Compilations ===
- Bang Gang DJs - Light Sound Dance (Modular, 2007)
- This Was meant to be a Celebration (Mauled by Tigers, 2007)
- Scion Sampler - I Heart Comix remixed" (Scion, 2008)
- Wham City Box No. 1 (Wham City, 2008)
- Ninja Cutz - "You Don't Know"" (Ninja Tune, 2008)
- Ninja Tune XX - (Ninja Tune, 2010)

=== Music videos ===
- "Negative Thinking" directed by Danny Baxter rel Jan 2008
- "Around The World" directed by Demonbabies/Jesus Riviera rel Jul 2008
- "Intermission" directed by Dan Santiago rel Jan 2009
- "The Death Set" cover / remix of Daedelus - "Fair Weathered Friends" directed by Lazlo, presented by Project Fathom. Drawn by J. Penry. Animation by J. Millowe. rel Jul 2010
- "Slap Slap Slap Pound Up Down Snap" directed by Colin Devin Moore rel Jan 2011
- "We Are Going Anywhere Man" directed by Evan Wunsch rel Apr 2011
- "Can You Seen Straight?" directed by Offner Aurelien rel Jun 2011
- "It's Another Day" directed by Autista Collective rel Jul 2011
- "The Mess Up - DZ Deathrays Rmix" directed by Johnny Siera & Sly Pilot rel Nov 2011
- "Chew it Like a Gun Gum" directed by Dominic Lahiff and Lucas Howe rel Dec 2011
- "They Come To Get Us" directed by Guillaume Panariello rel Feb 2012
- "Is It The End Again?" directed by Sebastien Landry rel May 2012
- "I Miss You Beau Velasco" directed by Jay Buim rel Mar 2013
- "Lite The Fuse" directed by Sofia Szamosi rel Jan 2014
- "Soar Away" directed by Brandon Dermer rel Mar 2014
- "Elephant" August 2021
- "No Where Is Here" August 2021
- "Set For Death" September 2021
- "Fall Down" October 2021

=== Documentary ===
- Todd P Goes to Austin - (FVMMO FILMS, LLC, 2010)
- The Adventures of Quanni Cannonz - (Dan Santiago, 2011)

=== Clothing collaborations ===
- The Death Set x Stussy Tee - (Stussy Japan, Jul 2008)
- The Death Set x Mishka NYC Tee - (Mishka NYC, Nov 2010)
