= Bangers & Cash =

Spank Rock and Benny Blanco Are... "Bangers & Cash"

EP by Spank Rock and Benny Blanco
- Released: October 9, 2007
- Recorded: 2007
- Genre: Alternative hip hop, dirty rap
- Length: 17:12
- Label: Downtown Records
- Producer: Benny Blanco

Spank Rock chronology
YoYoYoYoYo (2006)	Bangers & Cash (2007)	Everything Is Boring and Everyone Is a Fucking Liar (2011)

Benny Blanco chronology
Bangers & Cash (2007)	Friends Keep Secrets (2018)

Spank Rock and Benny Blanco Are... "Bangers & Cash" is an EP by Philadelphian Virginian alternative rapper Spank Rock and record producer Benny Blanco. The EP follows Spank Rock's 2006 debut album YoYoYoYoYo. The album was released on October 9, 2007.

== Background ==
Spank Rock's frontman, Naeem Juwan, met Blanco when he was interning for the late Disco D. Blanco proposed the idea of creating an EP that was based on 2 Live Crew samples. Juwan was initially concerned that "it might be cheesy", but he continued that the EP "actually turned out to be really fun and I'm really proud of it." Like 2 Live Crew and Spank Rock's material, the EP included hypersexual lyrical content. Spank Rock and Benny Blanco co-wrote every song on Bangers & Cash together. It was described by Juwan as "just like club banger music, party music."

The EP's cover art is also a homage to 2 Live Crew, mimicking their As Nasty As They Wanna Be cover.

== Release and reception ==
The Bangers & Cash was ultimately released on October 9, 2007. Spank Rock and Benny Blanco also released videos for "Pu$$y", "B-O-O-T-A-Y", and "Loose".

Rolling Stone slated the album. The publication described the EP as "raunchy, megahorny hip-hop, [...] knowingly ridiculous and over-the-top", and stated that "Spank Rock seems to be on autopilot for most of the album, and neither his one-track mind nor Blanco's high-energy, low-payoff music produces anything worth going back to."

== Track listing ==
All tracks written by Naeem Juwan and Benjamin Levin.

1. "Shake That" – 3:08
  - Samples: "Shake That Ass Bitch" by Splack Pack, written by S. Chavis, K. Buchanan and J. Hardnett
  - Samples: "The Fuck Shop" by 2 Live Crew, written by Luther Campbell, Mark Ross, David Hobbs and Chris Wong Won
2. "B-O-O-T-A-Y" (featuring Santogold and Sylvia Gordon) – 3:10
  - Samples: "I Wanna Rock" by Luke Skyywalker, written by Luther Campbell
  - Samples: "Booty Drop" by Fresh Kid Ice and DJ Spin, written by Chris Wong Won and Darren Rudnick
  - Samples: "Shake a Lil' Somethin'" by 2 Live Crew, written by Mark Ross, David Hobbs and Chris Wong Won
3. "Loose" (featuring Amanda Blank) – 3:35
  - Samples: "Get Loose Now" by 2 Live Crew, written by Luther Campbell, Mark Ross, David Hobbs and Chris Wong Won
  - Samples: "Hoochie Mama" by 2 Live Crew, written by Mark Ross, David Hobbs and Chris Wong
4. "Pu$$y" (featuring Sylvia Gordon) – 4:09
  - Samples: "We Want Some Pussy" by 2 Live Crew, written by Luther Campbell, Mark Ross, David Hobbs and Chris Wong Won
5. "Bitch!" – 3:10
  - Samples: "A Bitch Iz a Bitch" by N.W.A, written by O'Shea Jackson and Andre Young

== Personnel ==
- Producer – Benny Blanco, Vaughan Merrick (additional)
- Engineer – Vaughan Merrick, Will Juhans (assistant)
- Mixing – Vaughan Merrick
- Mastering – Herb Powers Jr.
- Photography – Adam Weiss
