= Yuksek =

French musician and DJ

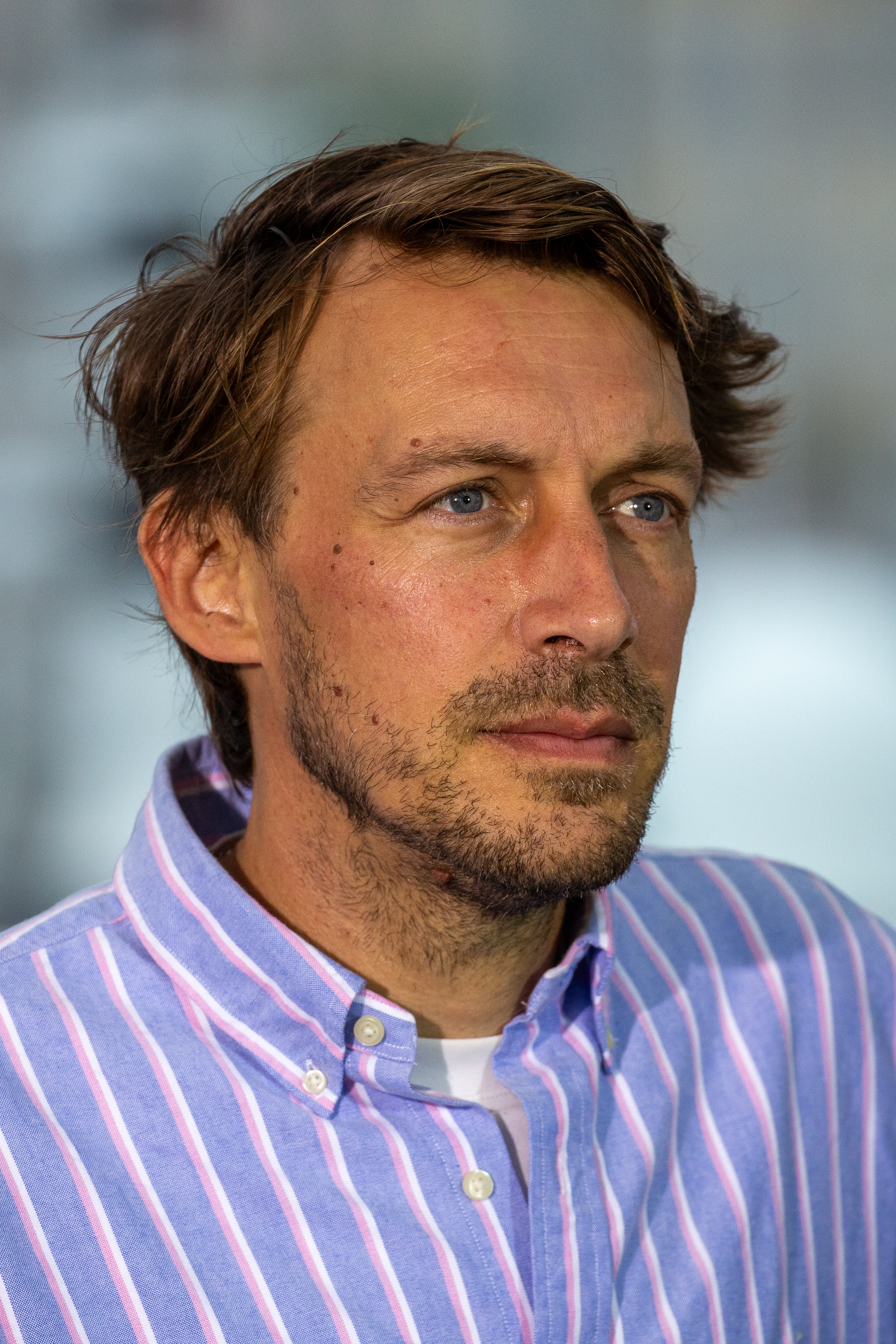
- Yuksek in 2025

Background information
- Born: Pierre-Alexandre Busson; 3 June 1977 (age 49)
- Origin: Reims, France
- Genres: French house, electropop, nu-disco
- Years active: 2002–present
- Labels: Kitsuné, I'm a Cliché, Rise Recordings, Relish Records, Savoir Faire, Barclay Records, Partyfine, Fiction Records
- Website: yuksekmusic.tumblr.com

Pierre-Alexandre Busson (French pronunciation: [pjɛʁ alɛksɑ̃dʁ bysɔ̃]; born 3 June 1977), better known as Yuksek, is a French electronic music producer, remixer, singer and DJ from Reims. Yüksek means 'high' or 'loud' in Turkish.

== Biography ==
Yuksek was born in Reims, France. Yuksek played the piano at the Conservatoire of Music until the age of 17. After giving up the piano, he took part in several bands such as Klanguage, whose first album was released in 2007.

He created his first tracks as Yuksek in 2002 and then started to perform successfully as a DJ all over the world. At the same time, his first EPs and remixes were released on labels such as Relish, I'm a Cliché, Kitsuné, Exploited and Citizen.

His debut album, Away from the Sea, was released on 9 February 2009. Featuring the singles "Tonight "and "Extraball", this album received a lot of media attention, including an interview on the popular French TV talk show Le Grand Journal on premium pay television channel Canal+. "Tonight" was also selected as the soundtrack for the show in January 2009. "Extraball" was featured in a commercial for the Airness "Attraction" deodorant, as well as Lacoste Red! collection in 2009. "Tonight" was also chosen for the Peugeot commercial "Alchemy", part of a major brand revival, that was broadcast on French TV from January 2010.

Yuksek has also been involved in many other musical projects such as The Krays (with Brodinski) and Peter & The Magician with Stephen Fasano, formerly a member of Aeroplane.

After touring for 2 years, Yuksek released his second album, Living on the Edge of Time, on 13 June 2011. This album, preceded by the single "On a Train", took a pop direction while retaining his electronic core.

In December 2011, Yuksek played the renowned New Year Rhythm and Vines festival in Gisborne, New Zealand, then headed to the Field Day music festival in Sydney, Australia on New Year's Day 2012.

In April 2013, Yuksek launched his own label, Partyfine. The first EP, EP#1 was released on 13 May 2013. It includes features from Juveniles and Oh Land. The second one, with Peter & The Magician, was released on 24 June 2013 and is titled On My Brain.

== Collaborations ==
=== The Krays ===
Yuksek is a longtime friend of Brodinski, a French DJ who also comes from Reims. The Krays is the musical collaboration between Yuksek and French producer Brodinski. Their first EP titled We’re Ready When You Are was released on 17 May 2010. (Abracada).

=== Peter & The Magician ===
Since 2011, Yuksek has been collaborating with The Magician (aka Stephane Fassano, former member of Aeroplane) under the stage name Peter & The Magician. Their first song "Twist" was released on a Kitsuné compilation (Kitsuné Maison Compilation 11: "The Indie Dance Issue") released on 26 May 2011.

The three-track EP also called Twist was released one month later on the Kitsuné label.

=== The Alexanders ===
The Alexanders is a collaboration between Yuksek and English DJ and producer Alex Metric. The Alexanders released their debut single "Don't Miss" through Yuksek's label Partyfine on 24 February 2014. The song features vocals from Anna Lunoe. The duo remixed Porter Robinson's "Lionhearted" (featuring Urban Cone), the third single from his debut studio album Worlds. The remix features on the extended play as well as the limited edition album box set.

== Discography ==
=== Albums ===
Year	Album details	Peak positions
Year	Album details	FR
2009	Away from the Sea: Released: 9 February 2009; Label: Rise Recordings; Formats: CD, digital download, LP	58
2011	Living on the Edge of Time: Released: 12 July 2011; Label: Savoir Faire; Formats: CD, digital download, LP	100
2017	Nous Horizon: Released: 24 February 2017; Label: Partyfine; Formats: CD, digital download, LP	89
2020	Nosso Ritmo: Released: 28 February 2020; Label: Partyfine; Formats: CD, digital download, LP	-
2023	Dance'O'Drome: Released: 26 May 2023; Label: Partyfine; Formats: CD, digital download, LP	-

=== Extended plays ===
Year	Title	Release date	Label
2002	Friendship Salad	2 April 2002	Hypnotic Music
2003	Fool Da Groove	5 November 2003	Hypnotic Music
2004	Hello Sukuki	March 2004	Hypnotic Music
2004	Everywhere In Town	4 April 2004	Copyright Control
2005	Should Be Slave	22 January 2005	Hypnotic Music
2005	The Wax	13 May 2005	P A Busson
2006	Sorry / Plastik	May 2006	Relish Records
2007	Composer	16 February 2007	Relish Recordings
2007	It Comes	26 November 2007	UWE
2008	Tonight	22 September 2008	Savoir Faire
2009	Extraball	29 April 2009	Savoir Faire
2009	So Far Away from the Sea	13 July 2009	Savoir Faire
2011	On a Train	29 April 2011	Savoir Faire
2011	Always On the Run	21 October 2011	Savoir Faire
2012	Off the Wall	24 February 2012	Savoir Faire
2012	Day 1 (Miyavi vs. Yuksek)	22 June 2012	EMI Music Japan
2012	The Edge	6 July 2012	Savoir Faire
2013	Partyfine EP#1	13 May 2013	Partyfine
2016	Sweet Addiction EP	17 June 2016	Partyfine

=== Singles ===
Year	Single	Peak positions	Album
Year	Single	FR	Album
2008	"Tonight"	67	Away from the Sea
2011	"Always On the Run"	49	Living on the Edge of Time
2013	"Last of Our Kinds" (featuring Oh Land)	200	Partyfine EP#1
2016	"Sweet Addiction" (featuring H.E.R.)	31	Sweet Addiction
2017	"Live Alone" (featuring Roman Rappak)	162	Nous Horizon
2018	"Showbiz"(featuring Villa)	-	Non-album single
2020	"Into The Light"(featuring Isaac Delusion)	-	Nosso Ritmo

=== Collaborations ===
Year	Artists	Title	Release date	Label
2010	The Krays (Yuksek & Brodinski) (feat. Ebony Bones)	We're Ready When You Are	17 May 2010	Abracada Records
2011	Peter & The Magician (Yuksek & The Magician)	Twist EP	20 June 2011	Kitsuné
2012	Peter & The Magician (Yuksek & The Magician)	Memory	9 July 2012	Kitsuné
2013	Peter & The Magician (Yuksek & The Magician)	On My Brain	24 June 2013	Partyfine
2014	The Alexanders (Yuksek & Alex Metric) (feat. Anna Lunoe)	Don't Miss	24 February 2014	Partyfine

=== Remixes ===
Year	Artist	Track	Title
2003	Klanguage	"Happy Feet"	
2004	The Film	"Can You Trust Me?"	
2004	Zimpala	"Can't Fall Asleep"	Yuksek On Plonk Remix
2005	ALB	"CV 209"	
2005	Amadou & Mariam	"La Réalité"	
2006	Brice Lee	"Spam"	
2006	Franz & Shape featuring Dirk Da Davo	"Maximum Joy"	
2006	Klanguage	"All This Time"	Yuksek vs. Invaders Remix
2007	Adam Kesher	"Feel You In My Arm"	
2007	ALB	"Daveg"	
2007	Birdy Nam Nam	"Trans Boulogne Express"	
2007	Bitchee Bitchee Ya Ya Ya	"Fuck Friend"	Brodinski & Yuksek Remix
2007	Chromeo	"Bonafied Lovin'"	
2007	Das Pop	"Fool for Love"	
2007	Detect	"Dance Division"	
2007	Klaxons	"Atlantis to Interzone"	Yuksek & Brodinski Remix
2007	Naast	"Mauvais Garçon"	
2007	Naive New Beaters	"Bang Bang"	
2007	Primary 1	"Hold Me Down"	Yuksek Remix; Yuksek Dub
2007	Shitdisco	"OK"	
2007	Siriusmo	"Allthegirls"	
2007	Teenage Bad Girl	"Hands of a Stranger"	
2007	The Teenagers	"Homecoming"	Yuksek & Brodinski Remix
2007	Zombie Nation	"Peace & Greed"	
2008	Alphabeat	"10.000 Nights"	Brodinski & Yuksek Remix
2008	Ghostface Killah	"Charlie Brown"	
2008	Kaiser Chiefs	"Never Miss a Beat"	
2008	M83	"Graveyard Girl"	
2008	Mika	"Lollipop"	
2008	Plugs	"That Number"	
2008	Siriusmo	"Wow"	
2008	Tahiti 80	"All Around"	
2008	The Shoes	"Keep That Control"	Yuksek 'Lost Control' Remix
2008	The Subs	"Papillon"	Yuksek & Brodinski Remix
2008	Tiga & Zyntherius	"Sunglasses at Night"	Brodinski & Yuksek Remix
2008	Tommy Sparks	"I'm a Rope"	
2008	Van She	"Strangers"	
2008	U-God	"Dopium"	
2008	Yuksek	"Tonight"	The Krays Remix (with Brodinski)
2009	AAA	"Break Your Name"	
2009	Amanda Blank	"Shame On Me"	
2009	AutoKratz	"Always More"	
2009	Booba	"Salade, Tomates, Oignons"	
2009	Bot'Ox	"Rue de l'Arsenal"	
2009	Ebony Bones	"The Muzik"	The Krays Remix (with Brodinski)
2009	Lady Gaga	"Paparazzi"	
2009	Moby	"Mistake"	
2009	Peaches	"Lose You"	Brodinski & Yuksek Remix
2009	Phoenix	"Lisztomania"	
2009	Rolf Honey	"Blast Up"	Yuksek Edit
2009	The Prodigy	"Invaders Must Die"	
2009	White Lies	"Farewell to the Fairground"	
2010	Aeroplane	"Superstar"	The Krays Remix (with Brodinski)
2010	Anything Maria	"Cook Him Up"	
2010	Athlete	"Superhuman Touch"	
2010	Fenech-Soler	"Demons"	Yuksek Vocal Remix; Yuksek Dub
2010	Gorillaz	"Stylo"	
2010	Gossip	"Heavy Cross"	
2010	Justice	"D.A.N.C.E."	Yuksek Edit
2010	Oh Land	"Sun of a Gun"	
2010	Robyn	"Indestructible"	The Krays Remix (with Brodinski)
2010	Vandroid	"Master and Slave"	
2011	Katy Perry	"Peacock"	
2011	Noah and the Whale	"Life is Life"	
2011	Yuksek	"Always on the Run"	Peter & The Magician Remix
2012	First Serve	"Must B the Music"	
2012	Juveniles	"Through the Night"	
2012	Stuck In the Sound	"Brother"	
2012	The Young Professionals	"TYP D.I.S.C.O"	
2013	Baby & Me	"Here Comes the Hotstepper (Evian Version)"	Yuksek Club Mix; Yuksek Remix
2013	Black Yaya	"Paint a Smile On Me"	Yuksek Dub Edit
2013	Blur	"Girls & Boys"	Yuksek 'DJ Friendly' Edit
2013	C2C featuring Gush	"Genius"	
2013	Chassol	"Odissi, Pt. II (Emotif)"	
2013	Chateau Marmont	"Wind Blows"	
2013	Crayon	"Give You Up"	Yuksek Remix; Yuksek Dub
2013	Dan Croll	"Home"	
2013	Empire of the Sun	"DNA"	
2013	Gold Fields	"Moves"	
2013	Griefjoy	"Touch Ground"	
2013	Kasper Bjørke featuring Jacob Bellens	"Sunrise"	Yuksek Remix; Yuksek Dub
2013	Kostrok	"Right Now"	
2013	Lilly Wood and the Prick	"Middle of the Night"	
2013	Rizzle Kicks	"Skip to the Good Bit"	
2013	Yuksek	"Last of Our Kinds"	Yuksek Club Remix
2014	Emmanuelle Seigner	"You Think You're a Man"	
2014	Montmartre	"Inside of Me"	
2014	Porter Robinson	"Lionhearted"	The Alexanders Remix (with Alex Metric)
2015	Brigitte	"À bouche que veux-tu"	
2015	Lana Del Rey	"Brooklyn Baby"	
2016	Hyphen Hyphen	"We Light the Sunshine"	
2016	Keren Ann	"Where Did You Go ?"	
2016	Rocky	"Big South"	Yuksek Remix Extended Version
2016	Talisco	"The Keys	
2016	Two Door Cinema Club	"Bad Decisions"	
2017	Bertrand Burgalat	"Étranges nuages"	
2017	CLAAP!	"Summertime"	
2017	Projections	"Distorsions"	
2018	Breakbot	"Devotion"	
2018	Crooked Colours	"Perfect Run"	
2018	Moullinex, Da Chick	"Daydream"	
2018	Poolside	"Feel Alright"	
2018	Purple Disco Machine featuring Baxter	"Encore"	
2018	Simon Says	"Feel Me"	Yuksek Remix; Yuksek Extended Remix
2018	Therapie TAXI	"Coma idyllique"	
2018	Tim Dup	"Fin août"	
2018	WhoMadeWho	"Goodbye to All I Know"	
2018	Yuksek	"Icare"	
2019	Alex Rossi	"Tutto Va Bene Quando Facciamo L'Amore"	Yuksek DSKOTK Remix
2019	Balthazar	"Changes"	
2019	Electric Guest	"1 4 Me"	
2019	Fred Pallem, Le Sacre du Tympan	"L'Odyssée"	
2019	JKriv, Adi Oasis	"Vertigo"	
2019	Keren Ann	"Nager la nuit"	
2019	Kiddy Smile	"Be Honest"	
2019	Kraak & Smaak, Izo FitzRoy	"Sweet Time"	Yuksek Remix; Yuksek Dub Remix; Yuksek Remix Edit
2019	L'Impératrice	"Vacances"	
2019	Maestro	"Harmony"	
2019	Mighty Mouse	"The Spirit"	Yuksek Remix; Yuksek Extended Remix
2019	Moonlight Matters	"Kitt"	Yuksek Edit
2020	All We Are	"Not Your Man"	
2020	Crystal Murray	"Princess"	
2020	Dimitri From Paris, Aeroplane	"Can't Get Enough"	
2020	Dombrance	"Poutou"	
2020	Elia y Elizabeth	"Alegría"	
2020	Helio Matheus	"Mais Kriola"	
2020	Les Hiboux	"Vai Ser Muito Bom"	Yuksek "Bloco" Remix
2020	Malik Djoudi	"Epouser la nuit"	
2020	O.N.O	"Modern Dance"	
2020	Pyramid, Lucas Nätcher	"Love on the Edge"	Remix by Yuksek
2020	Risk Assessment featuring Jemeni G	"Remember Me"	Yuksek Extended Remix
2020	Sidwho?	"Shake (Your Body)"	Yuksek Remix; Yuksek Extended Remix
2021	Alexia Gredy	"Vertigo"	Yuksek Edit
2021	Bosq, Kaleta	"Wake Up"	
2021	Don Turi, La Chica	"Connection Lost"	
2021	Feu! Chatterton	"Écran Total"	Yuksek Extended Remix
2021	Glamour Hammer	"Is It True"	
2021	Ishi	"Not My Girl"	
2021	Orchestre Les Mangelepa	"Nyako Konya"	
2021	Patawawa	"All the Time"	Yuksek 1984 Remix
2021	Polocorp	"Gwana"	
2021	Saint DX	"Ilya"	
2021	Sentimental Animals, JKriv, Dicky Trisco, Nicki B The Vagabond	"Love Vibration"	
2021	Silly Boy Blue	"The Riddle"	
2022	Alex Blex	"Nice move, Peter!"	
2022	Alexia Gredy	"Un peu plus souvent"	
2022	Diogo Strausz	"Flight of Sagittarius"	
2022	Bertrand Burgalat, Valli	"Étranges sillages"	
2022	Laurent Bardainne, Tigre d'Eau Douce, Bertrand Belin	"Oiseau"	
2022	Nathalie Duchene	"Praia"	
2022	Underground System	"Desnuda"	
2023	Asha Puthli	"I Am Song (Sing Me)"	
2023	Jean Aubergine, Dave Lee, Amy Douglas	"Disco Numberwang"	
2023	lovetempo	"The Sun"	

=== Music videos ===
Video clips have been produced for the following tracks: "Tonight", "Extraball", "Sunrise", "On A Train", "Always On The Run", "Off The Wall", "Do Beijo", "Gorgeous", "Into The Light" and "G.F.Y.".

=== Production ===
He produced Manual for Successful Rioting - Birdy Nam Nam’s second album - (except track 11 produced by Justice).
