= FabricLive.33 =

Compilation album by Spank Rock
- Released: April 2007
- Genre: Electronic music
- Label: Fabric

Spank Rock chronology
YoYoYoYoYo (2006)	FabricLive.33 (2007)

FabricLive chronology
FabricLive.32 (2007)	FabricLive.33 (2007)	FabricLive.34 (2007)

Professional ratings
Review scores
Source	Rating
Allmusic	3/5 stars
Pitchfork Media	(6.9/10)

FabricLive.33 is a DJ mix compilation album by Spank Rock, as part of the FabricLive Mix Series.

== Track listing ==
1. Intro
2. Kurtis Blow – The Breaks – Universal
3. CSS – Let's Make Love and Listen to Death from Above (Spank Rock Remix) – Sub Pop
4. Mr Oizo – Nazis (Justice Mix) – F Communications
5. Dominatrix – The Dominatrix Sleeps Tonight – Stuart Argabright
6. Yello – Bostich – Universal
7. Zongamin – Bongo Song – XL
8. Kano – I'm Ready – Antibemusic
9. Daft Punk – Technologic – Virgin
10. Switch – A Bit Patchy – Data
11. The Contours – Do You Love Me – Motown
12. Mylo – Drop the Pressure – Breastfed
13. Yes – Owner of a Lonely Heart – Rhino
14. Para One – Dudun Dun – Institubes
15. Best Fwends – Myself (Xxxchange Remix) – Moshi Moshi
16. KW Griff – Good Man – Morphius
17. Uffie – Hot Chick (Feadz Edit) – Ed Banger
18. Metro Area – Orange Alert (DFA Remix) – Source
19. Tangerine Dream – Love on a Real Train – Virgin
20. Simian Mobile Disco – Hustler – Wichita
21. The Romantics – Talking in Your Sleep – Nemperor Records
22. Chicks on Speed - Wordy Rappinghood (The Playgroup Remix) - Chicks on Speed Records
23. Bonde do Rolê – Melô Do Tabacco (XXXChange Remix with The Ford Granada) – Mad Decent
24. Miss Kittin and The Hacker – Stock Exchange – Miss Kittin
25. Rick Ross – Hustlin' – Island Def Jam
26. Hot Chip – Over and Over (Maurice Fulton Remix) – EMI
27. Gaz Nevada – I.C. Love Affair – Expanded Music
28. L.T.D. – Love to the World – A&M
29. Outro
