= Away from the Sea =

Away From The Sea

Studio album by Yuksek
- Released: 9 February 2009
- Recorded: 2009
- Genre: Electro house
- Length: 46:58
- Label: Barclay, Has Been, Cherrytree
- Producer: Yuksek

Yuksek chronology
Away From The Sea (2009)	Living on the Edge of Time (2011)

Singles from Away From The Sea
- 1. "Tonight" Released: 17 November 2008; 2. "Extraball" Released: 30 April 2009

Professional ratings
Review scores
Source	Rating
strangeglue	5/10 stars
dailymusicguide	2/5 stars
Subba-Cultcha	6/10 stars
URB	4/5 stars
Virgin Media	6/10 stars
XLR8R	5.5/10 stars

Away From The Sea is the debut studio album by French electro house artist, Yuksek. The album was released on 9 Feb 2009 through Barclay Records.

The first single from the album, "Tonight", was performed live in China and featured in the video produced by Peugeot for their 200-year anniversary.

The second single from the album, "Extraball", was used in an advert by the Lacoste clothing brand to release their "Red Label" line of clothing.

The hidden track of the album was composed by The Bewitched Hands. It consists in a rearranged and acoustic version of Tonight. This track is also used at the end of the video clip Tonight, where Yuksek takes part of a choir.

== Reception ==
The album received average reviews, with the exception of Yuksek's collaboration with Philadelphian singer Amanda Blank, which was often described as the album's highlight. Jon Davies, of dailymusicguide, stated that "Spank Rock's Amanda Blank livens up the track with her irresistible flow while Yuksek backs her with outrageously filthy beats and a few riffs stolen from Daft Punk"; while tempering this was his view of the album as a whole, stating that "It's questionable why anyone would want to listen to this when you can hear Justice do this kind of thing infinitely better."
Urb magazine was more positive, stating that "Away From The Sea is altogether an impressive effort that establishes Yuksek’s sound without hindering his creativity and awarding the album 4 out of 5 stars.

== Track listing ==
All tracks written and produced by Pierre-Alexandre Busson, except where noted.

No.	Title	Writer(s)	Producer(s)	Length
1.	"Break Ya"			3:30
2.	"Tonight"			3:13
3.	"A Certain Life"			3:01
4.	"Extraball" (feat. Amanda Blank, Clément Daquin)	Blank; Busson; Daquin		3:32
5.	"Take A Ride"			3:39
6.	"I Could Never Be A Dancer"			3:15
7.	"So Far Away From The Sea" (feat. The Bewitched Hands on the Top of Our Heads, Melis)	Anthonin Ternant; Benjamin Pinard; Nicolas Kartz; Busson		3:16
8.	"Little Dirty Trip" (Vicarious Bliss remix)			4:31
9.	"This Is Not Today" (feat. Shitdisco)	Busson; Shitdisco		4:15
10.	"I Like To Play" (feat. The Forum Digital Choir)			4:29
11.	"So Down" (feat. Chromeo)	David Macklovitch; Busson	Yuksek; Chromeo	3:44
12.	"Freak O Rocker"			3:16
13.	"Eat My Bear" (feat. Forum Digital Choir)			3:17
Total length:				46:58

== Personnel ==
- Yuksek – mixing, vocals
- Photography, Art Direction, Design – Anastasia Constantinescu, Laurent Fetis
