= Skuffed Up My Huffy =

Studio album by Japanther
- Released: 11 September 2007
- Genres: Punk rock, noise pop, indie rock, experimental rock
- Length: 28:40
- Labels: Menlo Park; We Are Busy Bodies

Japanther chronology
| Don't Trust Anyone Over Thirty (2006) | Skuffed Up My Huffy (2007) | Tut, Tut, Now Shake Ya Butt (2008) |

Professional ratings
Review scores
| Source | Rating |
|---|---|
| Prefix Mag | (7.5/10) |
| Sputnikmusic | (3.5/5) |

Skuffed Up My Huffy is an album by Japanther. It was released by Menlo Park Recordings in 2007. The album was also released on vinyl by Altin Village & Mine Records. In Canada, the album was released on CD by We Are Busy Bodies.

== Track listing ==
1. "See Evil" – 1:53
2. "Summer of 79" – 2:00
3. "Mornings" – 1:54
4. "Cable Babies" – 2:19
5. "Vagabond" – 2:16
6. "$100 Cover" – 3:00
7. "River Phoenix" – 2:26
8. "Challenge" – 2:59
9. "Fuk tha Prince a Pull Iz Dum" – 2:50
10. "Funeral" – 0:55
11. "Tender People" – 1:46
12. "The Boss" – 1:26
13. untitled – 0:33
14. "Boys Don't Cry" – 1:24
15. "Cable Babies" (live) – 1:06
