= Menya =

American musical group

- Origin: New York City
- Genres: Hip hop, electronic, crunk
- Years active: 2007–unknown
- Labels: Unsigned
- Members: Coco Dame, Good Goose, Angie Ripe

Menya were a crunk group formed in New York City in 2007 by two musicians, known as "Coco Dame" and "Good Goose". That year, when both of them were undergraduates at New York University, they saw M.I.A., The Cool Kids, Santigold, and Spank Rock perform at that year's CMJ festival. Angie Ripe soon joined them, and contributed vocals to their debut release, The Ol' Reach Around. They self-released two EPs (The Ol' Reach Around and Puss Coital), and a mixtape (The Sleepover Series Vol. 1), the first two in 2008 and the third on October 23, 2009. Their music is recorded in the members' bedrooms. The Ol' Reach Around was recorded between their college classes, at the studio where Good Goose was a production assistant.

All three of the group's members were once students of well-known music critic Robert Christgau, who teaches in the Clive Davis Department of Recorded Music at NYU. After Christgau was given a copy of The Ol' Reach Around, which they had just recorded as a demo, he reviewed it favorably, giving it an A− and describing it as "the first of many student demos that I've eagerly played twice". He also said that he sent it to three of his editors, all of whom echoed his positive assessment of the EP. He also rated it the 18th best album of 2008 on his "Dean's List". Other critics have noted that Menya's music frequently centers on overtly sexual themes.

== Discography ==
- The Ol' Reach Around (2008)
- Puss Coital (2008)
- The Sleepover Series Vol. 1 (2009)
