= Pleased to Meet You =

Pleased to Meet You may refer to:

== Music ==
- Pleased to Meet You, documentary video about the making of Harmonium by Vanessa Carlton

=== Albums ===
- Pleased to Meet You (James album)
- Pleased to Meet You (Sleeper album)
- Pleased to Meet You, by Hank Jones
- Pleased to Meet You, by MercyMe

=== Songs ===
- "Pleased to Meet You", by Aneiki
- "Pleased to Meet You", by Bill Frisell from Gone, Just Like a Train
- "Pleased to Meet You", by James from Pleased to Meet You
- "Pleased to Meet You", by Japanther from Leather Wings
- "Pleased to Meet You", by Wolfmother from Music from and Inspired by Spider-Man 3

== Other uses ==
- "Pleased to Meet You" (Holby City), a 2019 television episode
- Pleased to Meet You, short-story collection by Caroline Adderson
- Pleased to Meet You, comedy programme on BBC Radio 7

== See also ==
- "Sympathy for the Devil", by The Rolling Stones whose chorus begins with the line "pleased to meet you"
- "Song 2", 1997 song by Blur, the lyrics of which contain the phrase "pleased to meet you"
