= I Love You (Amanda Blank album) =

Studio album by Amanda Blank
- Released: August 4, 2009
- Genres: Dirty rap, Baltimore club, electropop
- Length: 33:37
- Label: Downtown Records
- Producers: Diplo, Switch, XXXChange, Jacknife Lee

Singles from I Love You
- 1. "Might Like You Better" Released: May 26, 2009

I Love You is the debut album by Philadelphia-based rapper and singer Amanda Blank. The album was released on August 4, 2009, through Downtown Records.

== Critical reception ==
Professional ratings
Aggregate scores
| Source | Rating |
|---|---|
| Metacritic | 59/100 |
Review scores
| Source | Rating |
| AllMusic | 3/5 stars |
| Billboard | (positive) |
| NOW | 5/6 stars |
| The Observer | (positive) |
| Rolling Stone | 3/5 stars |
| Spin | 2.5/5 stars |
| Sputnikmusic | 2.5/5 stars |
| URB | 3.5/5 stars |
| Pitchfork Media | (2.0/10) |
| NME | (6.0/10) |

I Love You received mixed reviews from music critics, earning a rating of 59 out of 100 on Metacritic based on 17 reviews. Billboard described the album as "guiltless fun, just like any proper quickie." The Observer said "amid the sighs and groans, she [Blank] hits the pop G-spot with her savvy hooks and superlative rhyming." URB magazine noted that "whether it's the heart, soul or ovaries that are dictating the desires on I Love You's songs, always lurking under Amanda Blank's flow are Diplo's exotically growling beats, which remain sweaty, fast-paced and aggressive [...] her heartfelt lyrics makes [...] some of the most unexpectedly personable material to come out of Diplo's party-centric clique."

== Commercial performance ==
In its first week, I Love You sold 4,000 units in the United States. As of February 2022, the album had sold a total of 29,000 copies in the US, according to Billboard.

== Track listing ==
1. "Make It Take It" — 2:25
2. "Something Bigger, Something Better" — 3:04
3. "Make-Up" — 2:16
4. "Gimme What You Got" (featuring Spank Rock) — 2:46
5. "Lemme Get Some" (featuring Chuck Inglish of The Cool Kids) — 3:01
6. "Shame on Me" — 3:56
7. "A Love Song" (featuring Santigold) — 3:33
8. "DJ" — 2:53
9. "Might Like You Better" — 2:55
10. "Big Heavy" — 3:59
11. "Leaving You Behind" (featuring Lykke Li) — 2:45

Samples/covers

- "Make-Up" is a cover of the Vanity 6 song "Make-Up".
- "A Love Song" contains interpolations of LL Cool J's "I Need Love", Santigold's "I'm a Lady" and K-Otix's "Love Song".
- "Might Like You Better" title and lyrics from the Romeo Void song "Never Say Never".

== Credits ==
- Vocals – Amanda Blank
- Featured vocalists – Naeem Juwan (track 4), Chuck Inglish (track 5), Santigold (track 7), Lykke Li (track 11)
- Producers – Diplo (Wesley Pentz), Switch (Dave Taylor), XXXchange (Alex Epton), David Andrew Sitek (TV on the Radio), Jacknife Lee

== Charts ==
| Chart (2009) | Peak position |
|---|---|
| French Albums Chart | 197 |
| U.S. Billboard 200 | 109 |
| U.S. Digital Albums | 21 |
| U.S. Top Electronic Albums | 6 |
| U.S. Top Heatseekers | 3 |
| U.S. Independent Albums | 17 |

=== Singles ===
| Single | Chart (2009) | Peak position |
|---|---|---|
| "Shame On Me" | Dance/Club Play Songs | 28 |
