= Eat Like Lisa Act Like Bart =

Studio album by Japanther
- Released: 2013
- Genres: Punk rock, Noise pop
- Length: 29:57
- Label: Recess Records

Japanther chronology
Beets, Limes and Rice (2011)	Eat Like Lisa Act Like Bart (2013)

Professional ratings
Review scores
Source	Rating
Pop Matters	6/10 stars
Consequence of Sound	3/5 stars
buffaBLOG	(B−)

Eat Like Lisa Act Like Bart is a studio album by American experimental punk band Japanther. This was the follow-up to their album Beets, Limes and Rice. It was released on May 21, 2013 on the Recess Records label. The first single, "Stolen Flowers" was released on April 17, 2013 on Stereogum. The entire album was later available to stream on Spin's website on May 14, one week prior to its release.

== Track listing ==
1. "Do Not Resuscitate" - 2:13
2. "Stolen Flowers" - 2:08
3. "More Teachers, Less Cops" - 2:49
4. "The Drums Deliver" - 2:01
5. "Buy a Life" - 1:53
6. "125th and Riverside" - 2:59
7. "Five Lions" - 3:18
8. "Green Spray Paint" - 2:01
9. "Light Weight Jealous" - 1:18
10. "Something to Do" - 1:54
11. "A Head Bronco" - 3:11
12. "Her Neighborhood" - 2:01
13. "Wasted Day" - 2:11
