= Amanda Blank =

American rapper

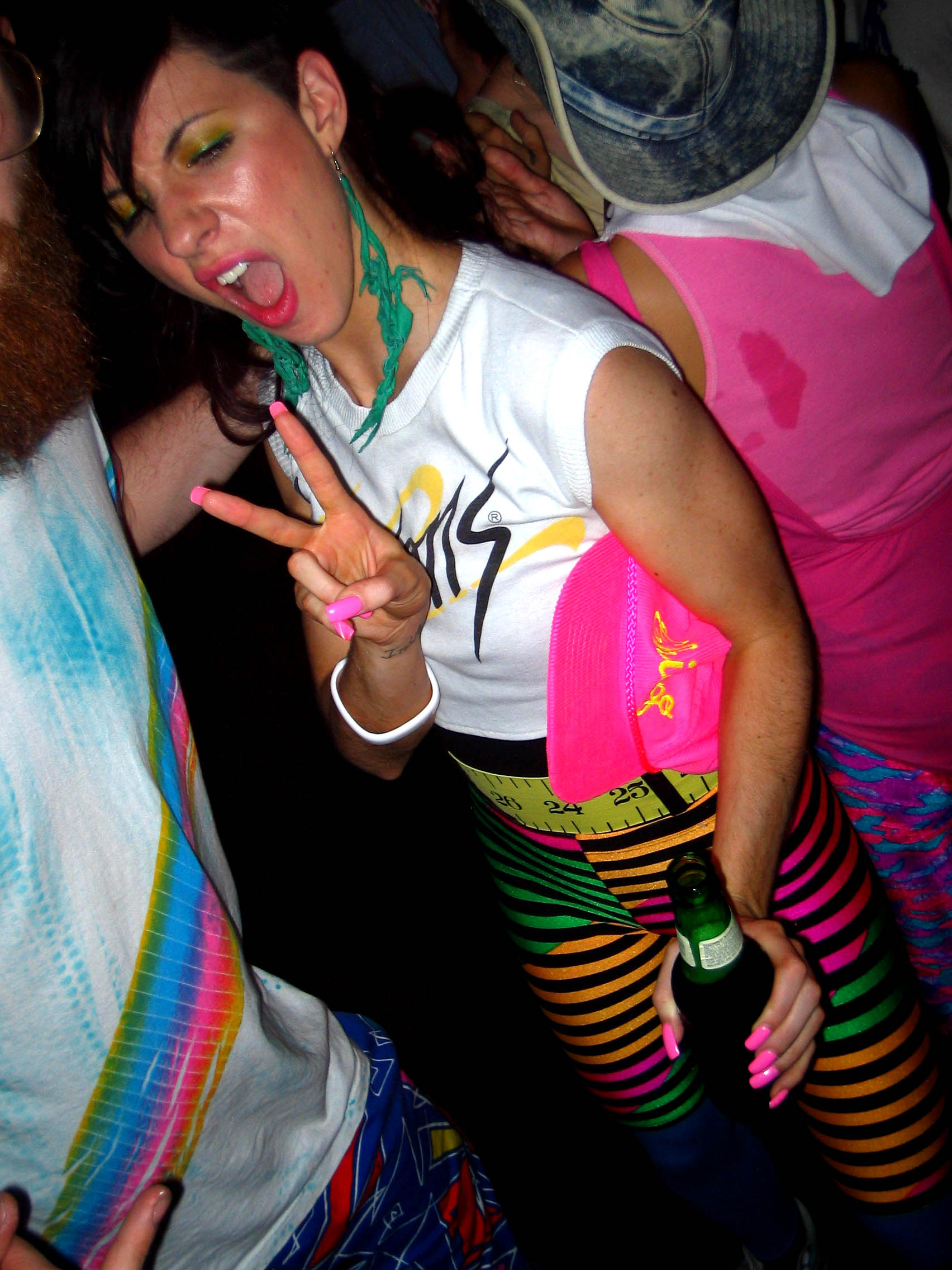
- Blank in 2006

Background information
- Born: Amanda Mallory McGrath; March 10, 1983 (age 43)
- Origin: Philadelphia, Pennsylvania, U.S.
- Genres: Electronica; Baltimore club
- Occupations: Rapper, singer-songwriter
- Years active: 2004–present
- Label: Downtown Records
- Member of: Sweatheart
- Spouse: Matt Helders (m. 2023)
- Website: www.amandablank.com

Amanda Blank (born Amanda Mallory McGrath; March 10, 1983) is an American singer, rapper and member of the performance art band Sweatheart based in Philadelphia.

== Early life ==
Amanda Blank was born in Germantown, a neighborhood in northwest Philadelphia, Pennsylvania in 1983. Amanda and her sisters were raised in a row house in Germantown by artist parents. Blank based her stage name on Strangers with Candy character, Jerri Blank, played by Amy Sedaris.

== Career ==
She frequently collaborates with rapper Naeem, most notably on the track "Blow" on the mix CD Bmore Gutter Music and later "Bump" on the album YoYoYoYoYo, released in 2006. Her songs have appeared in HBO's Life Support and the CSI: NY episode "Buzzkill". In 2007, she was featured on the official Eli Escobar and Doug Grayson remix for Britney Spears's hit single "Gimme More". In early 2008, Blank was described as being part of "a new crop of young, multicultural, female hip-hop acts in the wake of MIA causing a stir on the internet and in indie-label conference rooms." Blank's song "Supafreak" appeared in the movie Observe and Report in 2009. She was featured on the song "Loose" on the Spank Rock and Benny Blanco are Bangers & Cash EP, which appeared in the ABC show Castle episode "Lucky Stiff". Blank's song "Make It Take It" appeared in a commercial for McDonald's in 2010.

Blank signed to Downtown Records in 2007. Her first solo album, I Love You, was produced by XXXChange, Diplo, and Dave Sitek in August 2009, with her first single being "Might Like You Better".

Amanda Blank has opened for Canadian electroclash musician Peaches, the Yeah Yeah Yeahs, and label mate Santigold.

On May 16, 2019, she released a song called "Put Me Out." In 2020, she had a feature in the track "WooWooWoo", on Naeem's album Startisha.

== Personal life ==
Blank married Arctic Monkeys drummer Matt Helders in 2023.

== Discography ==
=== Albums ===
- 2005: Bmore Gutter Music (Mix CD)
- 2006: Blow (EP)
- 2009: I Love You
- TBA: The Ruiner

=== Singles ===
- 2009: "Might Like You Better"
- 2009: "Shame on Me"
- 2019: "Put Me Out"
- 2020: "Oh Man"
- 2021: "Love You Again"

=== Other ===
- 2007: "Get It Now" 12"

=== Featuring work ===
- "Foul Mouth" – on Dimensional People LP (with Mouse on Mars)
- "Quicksand (Mad Decent 2010 Rerub)"- (with Major Lazer)
- "A Volta" – feat. Sizzla and Lovefoxxx, on The Spirit of Apollo LP (with NASA)
- "Bump" – 12" (with Spank Rock)
- "Extraball" – on the Away from the Sea LP (with Yuksek)
- Lindsay Lohan's Revenge – 12" (with Pase Rock)
- Supahead – (Wowo Bmore Gutter Music)
- Loose – 12" (with Bangers & Cash)
- Pillowface and His Airplane Chronicles – (with Spank Rock)
- Sexy Motherfucker – 12" (with Pase Rock)
- Blow Remix EP – (with Aaron LaCrate, 45 King, Dj Equalizer, Debonair Samir)
- YoYoYoYoYo – (with Spank Rock)
- Startisha - (with Naeem)
- Bmore Gutter Music – (with Aaron LaCrate, Low Budget, Spank Rock)
- "What U Like" – (with Major Lazer)
- "Love Thing Part 3 (Only you)" – On Eli Escobar's "Love thing" LP
- "Psycho Killa" – On The '87 Stick Up Kids "Car Keys & Rabbit Feet" LP
