= Strangers (Van She song) =

Single by Van She

from the album V
- Released: 23 June 2008
- Recorded: 2007
- Length: 3:36
- Label: Modular Recordings
- Songwriter: Van She
- Producer: Jim Abbiss

Van She singles chronology
"Cat and the Eye" (2007)	"Strangers" (2008)	"Changes" (2008)

"Strangers" is the second single by Van She taken from the band's debut album V.

== Charts ==
Chart (2008)	Peak position
ARIA Hitseekers Chart	6

== Track listing ==
1. "Strangers" - 3:36
2. "Strangers" (Yuksek remix) - 4:37
3. "Strangers" (Strip Steve remix) - 6:00
4. "Strangers" (Van She tech rework) - 3:49
