= Ze Vemixes =

Remix album by Van She
- Released: 12 June 2009
- Recorded: 2008–2009
- Genre: Electronic
- Length: 38:04
- Label: Modular
- Producer: Van She

Van She chronology
V (2008)	Ze Vemixes (2009)	Idea of Happiness (2012)

Ze Vemixes is the remix album to Van She's debut studio album, V. It was released on 12 June 2009 in Australia as a 2-disc CD with the original version of the album on the first disc. All of the tracks are by the band's offshoot Van She Technologic.

== Release and tour ==
Modular Recordings released the album on 12 June 2009, both digitally and as part of a two-disc set.

The group launched their tour on 19 June at the St Kilda's Prince Bandroom in Melbourne. They toured in June and July 2009 in Australia and New Zealand. Bag Raiders and Ted & Francis performed with Van She in Sydney. Other groups joining the tour included Ajax & Dangerous Dan, G.L.O.V.E.S, and The Touch.

== Critical reception ==
Stuart Evans, writing for bnext, was disappointed with the release, calling the album "uninspiring". Aaron Coultate, reviewing for Resident Advisor, found the album was able to keep his interest. Coultate noted that the track "It Could Be the Same" utilised "funky bleeps and piano stabs" in the place of the guitar on V, as well as the changes to "The Cat & The Eye" which incorporate mechanised distortion before becoming "more dark and atmospheric". Coultate acknowledged the album's "more industrial sound", but also stated that the album would have been better had it included remixes of V's tracks from other artists, such as G.L.O.V.E.S. He was disappointed in the final track, "Virgin Suicide".

== Track listing ==
The album featured a remix track for six of the tracks included on the album V as well as a live track and an original track. Tracks included:

1. "Changes" (Van She Tech Remix) – 5:55
2. "Talkin'" (Van She Tech Remix) – 3:44
3. "Strangers" (Ze Vemixes Remix) – 4:54
4. "It Could Be the Same" (Van She Tech Remix) – 5:13
5. "Sexual City" (Van She Tech Remix) – 6:16
6. "The Cat & The Eye" (Ze Vemixes Remix) – 4:10
7. "Techno Music" (Van She Tech Remix) – 4:22
8. "Virgin Suicide" (Acoustic Mix) – 3:30

== Charts ==
Ze Vemixes charted at number 15 on the ARIA Dance Album listing for the week of 5 August 2009.

== Sources ==
- "The ARIA Report" (PDF). Pandora. 5 August 2009. p. 19. Archived from the original (PDF) on 2 September 2009 – via Trove.
- "Feel Ze Vemixes". Three-D World. 2 June 2009. Archived from the original on 14 September 2009 – via Trove.
- "Van She get remixing and tour". Resident Advisor. 2 June 2009. Archived from the original on 12 August 2026.
- "Van She Tech Album Release Party". Under the Radar. 19 June 2009. Archived from the original on 27 June 2009.
- "Van She – Ze Remixes". Triple J. ABC News. 25 May 2009. Archived from the original on 13 January 2010 – via Trove.
- Coultate, Aaron (25 June 2009). "Van She – Ze Remixes". Resident Adviser. Archived from the original on 12 August 2026.
- Dib, Lisa (27 May 2009). "Van She announce Ze Vemixes tour". The Dwarf. Archived from the original on 30 September 2009 – via Trove.
- Donovan, Patrick (19 June 2009). "Sydney's best new rock band?". The Age.
- Evans, Stuart (2009). "Van She Ze-Vemixes". bnext. Archived from the original on 25 October 2009 – via Trove.
- Watts, Kate (21 May 2009). "Van She mixes it up". Eleven Magazine. Archived from the original on 14 February 2014 – via Trove.
