= V (Van She album) =

Studio album by Van She
- Released: 9 August 2008
- Recorded: 2006–2008
- Length: 46:37
- Label: Modular
- Producer: Van She; Jim Abbiss

Van She chronology
Van She (2005)	V (2008)	Ze Vemixes (2009)

Singles from V
- 1. "Cat & the Eye" Released: November 2007; 2. "Strangers" Released: 21 June 2008; 3. "Changes" Released: August 2008; 4. "Kelly (Album Version Re-Release)" Released: October 2008

V is the debut studio album by Australian electropop group Van She, released on 9 August 2008 by Modular Recordings. After writing a bulk of the songs from a small farm house south of Sydney, in early 2007 the band packed for the UK, where they recorded the album with UK producer Jim Abbiss, whose previous work includes production for Placebo, Arctic Monkeys and Massive Attack.

== Track listing ==
1. "Memory Man" – 3:31
2. "Cat & the Eye" – 4:02
3. "Changes" – 3:30
4. "Strangers" – 3:35
5. "It Could Be the Same" – 4:35
6. "The Sea" – 5:18
7. "Virgin Suicide" – 4:22
8. "Temps Mort" – 1:16
9. "Talkin'" – 3:33
10. "Kelly" – 4:54
11. "So High" – 4:40
12. "A Sharp Knife" – 4:16

== Charts ==
Chart performance for V
Chart (2008)	Peak position
Australian Albums (ARIA)	10

== Tours ==
- Cat & The Eye Tour (February 2008)
- Van She Party (July - August 2008)
- Club Mod Tour (August 2008)
- 'V' Album Launch Tour (September 2008)
