= FabricLive.31 =

Compilation album by The Glimmers
- Released: December 2006
- Genre: Electronic music
- Label: Fabric

The Glimmers chronology
DJ-Kicks: The Glimmers (2005)	FabricLive.31 (2006)	Eskimo Volume V (2007)

FabricLive chronology
FabricLive.30 (2006)	FabricLive.31 (2006)	FabricLive.32 (2007)

FabricLive.31 is a DJ mix compilation album by The Glimmers, as part of the FabricLive Mix Series.

== Track listing ==
1. Roxy Music - Same Old Scene (Glimmers Remix) - Virgin
2. Fingerprintz - Wet Job - Virgin
3. The League Unlimited Orchestra - Things That Dreams Are Made Of (Instrumental Remix) - EMI
4. Pop Dell' Arte - No Way Back - Different
5. The Glimmers - Kobe's In Columbia - Diskimo
6. Prins Thomas vs. Blackbelt Andersen - En Real Tjukkas - Trailerpark
7. The Holy Ghost - The World (The Dub) - Holy Ghost Inc
8. Sons and Daughters - Dance Me In (JD Twitch and The Truffle Club's Optimo Remix) - Domino
9. Neal Howard - The Gathering - Neal Howard
10. Freddie Mercury - Love Kills (More Oder ReWork By The Glimmers) - EMI
11. Mekon - Boy Bitten featuring Rita Brown (Padded Cell Remix) - Wall Of Sound/PIAS
12. Freeez - I.O.U. (I.Dub.U.) - Beggars Banquet
13. Chris "The Glove" Taylor & David Storrs - Reckless - Universal
14. George Kranz - Din Daa Daa - George Kranz
15. LCD Soundsystem - Disco Infiltrator - DFA
16. Urban Jungle - Bad Man (Black Dog Bite Mix) - Virgin
17. Black Slate - Sticks Man - CNR
18. Urban Jungle - Bad Man (Black Dog Bite Mix) - Virgin
19. Howie B - My Speedboat Is Faster Than Yours - Pussyfoot
20. Pierre Henry - Too Fortiche - Mercury
21. Arpadys - Monkey Star - Music Code
