= FabricLive.32 =

Compilation album by Tayo
- Released: February 2007
- Genre: Electronic music
- Label: Fabric

Tayo chronology
Beatz & Bobz Volume 3 (2004)	FabricLive.32 (2007)

FabricLive chronology
FabricLive.31 (2006)	FabricLive.32 (2007)	FabricLive.33 (2007)

FabricLive.32 is a DJ mix compilation album by Tayo, as part of the FabricLive Mix Series.

== Track listing ==
1. 2 tracks mixed:
  1. Tayo Meets Acid Rockers - Dread Cowboy - Tayo
  2. Loot and Pillage - The Curse - Dan Feary
2. Ursula 1000 feat. Sista Widey - Step Back (Deekline Remix) - ESL
3. Tayo and Undersound feat. Edu K - Putaria Toda Hora - Edu K
4. Blaqstarr - Tote It - Mad Decent
5. Sterotyp Meets Al' Haca - Blaz n Cook (Radio Slave Remix) - Klein
6. Buraka Som Sistema - Com Reispeito - Enchufada
7. Aquasky feat. Ragga Twins - Ready For This (Baobinga Mix) - Passenger
8. Tayo meets Baobinga - Choppa Riddim - Roots & Future
9. Bassbin Twins - Woppa - Bassbin
10. Si Begg - Move Up (Club Mix) - Mute/EMI
11. Tipper - Open The Jowls - Tippermusic
12. Buckfunk 3000 - Jump - Si Begg
13. Benga - Comb 60's - Planet Mu
14. Tayo and Care In The Community - Dutty Bomb - Tayo
15. Marc Adamo - Vicious Exit - Marc Adamo/Local Zeros 2006
16. Elemental - Soul Fire - Destructive
17. Sarantis feat. Warrior Queen - More Than Money - Senseless
18. Skream - Lightning - Tempa
19. Digital Mystikz - Neverland - DMZ
20. Rob Smith - Loveage - Rob Smith
21. Digital Mystikz - Anti War Dub feat. Spen G - DMZ
