= Worldwide (The Death Set album) =

Professional ratings
Aggregate scores
Source	Rating
Metacritic	71/100
Review scores
Source	Rating
Allmusic	3.5/5 stars
Alternative Press	3.5/5
Coke Machine Glow	60%
Contactmusic.com	3.5/5 stars
Drowned in Sound	7/10
musicOMH	3.5/5 stars
Pitchfork Media	6.8/10
Popmatters	7/10 stars
Spin	6/10
Tiny Mix Tapes	3.5/5 marks

Worldwide is a studio album by The Death Set.
