= Idea of Happiness =

Studio album by Van She
- Released: 10 July 2012
- Genre: Synth-pop
- Length: 41:51
- Label: Modular
- Producer: Nick Routledge; Michael Di Francesco

Van She chronology
| Ze Vemixes (2009) | Idea of Happiness (2012) |

Idea of Happiness is the second studio album by Australian electropop band Van She, released on 10 July 2012 through Modular Recordings. It received generally favourable reviews from critics and peaked at number 28 on the ARIA Albums Chart.

== Critical reception ==
Professional ratings
Aggregate scores
| Source | Rating |
|---|---|
| Metacritic | 65/100 |
Review scores
| Source | Rating |
| AllMusic | 3.5/5 stars |
| Boston Phoenix | 3/4 stars |
| DIY | 7/10 |
| The Line of Best Fit | 4/10 |
| MusicOMH | 3/5 stars |
| Pitchfork | 6.1/10 |

Idea of Happiness received a score of 65 out of 100 on review aggregator Metacritic based on five critics' reviews, indicating "generally favorable" reception. DIY's Colm McAuliffe described it as "a relentlessly, resolutely sunkissed cruise through a midsummer night's dream of synth pop Utopia", one that "ensures that all cynicism needs to be checked in order to enjoy even a smidgen of the album". Tim Sendra of AllMusic called the album "a synth lover's delight as each song is built around some of the nicest, fattest, squelchiest vintage tones around. Add to that a nice line in alternately joyful and melancholy songcraft that sits firmly in the same '80s-inspired ballpark as labelmates Cut Copy, and you've got something pretty pleasing to the ears".

Ryan Foley of the Boston Phoenix felt that the album "succeeds in its diligent quest to soundtrack our summers" and it "never tries to re-imagine the concept of the summer album or, at the very least, the genre of synthpop". Zach Kelly, reviewing the album for Pitchfork opined that "there isn't a lot that you're going to want take away with you after these 40 minutes are through. Still, there is something to be said for its ability to hold your attention while it's on, though perhaps not independently of whether or not you happen to be on a cool boat at the time."

Q felt that there is "certainly enough thrills to go round, even if Idea of Happiness is sometimes lacking the killer chorus that would take it to the next level". Ben Hogwood of MusicOMH stated that "Van She have all the elements they need for success par that one crucial melodic thrust", which he pointed out is "the killer melodic instinct that would make them ultimately memorable". The Line of Best Fit's Michelle Kambasha noted that Idea of Happiness is "an album that can only be described with vague adjectives; 'good' or maybe 'nice'" and that the last 15 seconds "leaves more to the listener's imagination than the entire album has done before this point".

== Track listing ==
All tracks are written by Van She

Idea of Happiness track listing
| No. | Title | Length |
|---|---|---|
| 1. | "Idea of Happiness" | 3:30 |
| 2. | "Calypso" | 4:16 |
| 3. | "Jamaica" | 4:33 |
| 4. | "Sarah" | 4:41 |
| 5. | "Radio Waves I" | 2:07 |
| 6. | "You're My Rescue" | 3:36 |
| 7. | "Tears" | 3:42 |
| 8. | "Coconuts" | 3:58 |
| 9. | "Beat of the Drum" | 5:15 |
| 10. | "Radio Waves II" | 3:18 |
| 11. | "We Move On" | 2:55 |
| Total length: | | 41:51 |

Digital bonus tracks
| No. | Title | Length |
|---|---|---|
| 12. | "In the Dark" | 4:10 |
| 13. | "Ghost Gurl" | 5:38 |
| Total length: | | 51:39 |

== Charts ==
Chart performance for Idea of Happiness
| Chart (2012) | Peak position |
|---|---|
| Australian Albums (ARIA) | 28 |
