= Van She (EP) =

EP by Van She
- Released: 27 November 2005 (UK)
- Recorded: 2005
- Length: 25:06
- Label: Modular

Van She chronology
Van She (2005)	V (2008)

Van She is the debut EP by Australian pop group Van She, released on 27 November 2005 by Modular Recordings. The song "Kelly" was remixed for their first full-length album V. The UK release featured the video clip for "Kelly".

== Track listing ==
1. "Mission" – 4:25
2. "Kelly" – 4:50
3. "Sex City" – 4:21
4. "Survive" – 3:36
5. "Kelly (Reprise)" – 2:56
6. "Here with You" – 4:56

== Charts ==
Chart performance for Van She
Chart (2006)	Peak position
Australia (ARIA)	87
