= Master of Pigeons =

Studio album by Japanther
- Released: 24 January 2005
- Genre: Punk rock, lo-fi, pop punk
- Length: 53:02
- Label: Menlo Park

Japanther chronology
The Operating Manual for Life on Earth EP (2004)	Master of Pigeons (2005)	Wolfenswan (2005)

Professional ratings
Review scores
Source	Rating
Dusted Magazine	(not rated)
Sputnikmusic	(4.0/5)

Master of Pigeons is an album by Japanther. It was released by Menlo Park Recordings in 2005.

== Track listing ==
1. "Swearing" – 1:13
2. "1-10" – 2:59
3. "Midtown" – 1:04
4. "Divorce" – 3:03
5. "Happiness" – 1:47
6. "Gas Station" – 0:34
7. "Summer Hills" – 2:16
8. "Pacific NW Last Chance to Dance" – 1:31
9. "Tourist" – 0:30
10. "Evil Earth" – 2:39
11. "Satie" – 3:42
12. "Change Your Life" – 2:54
13. "Stabby" – 2:08
14. "Mornings" – 1:25
15. "1-10" (live) – 3:07
16. "Midtown" (live) – 1:03
17. "Evil Earth" (live) – 2:41
18. "Change Your Life" (live) – 3:12
19. "South of Northport" (live) – 3:36
20. "Divorce" (live) – 2:48
21. "Happiness / Critical" (live) – 7:14
22. "Mornings" (live) – 1:47

== Notes ==
"Gas Station" also appears on the Methodist Leisure Inc. freebie funcore compilation Short Attention Span along with an unreleased live recording of the same track. (2009, Methodist Leisure Inc.)

There is much confusion over the track listing because of the way the sleeve is printed, including listings on Spotify. The last eight songs on the album are live recordings.
