= Living on the Edge of Time =

Studio album by Yuksek
- Released: 12 July 2011
- Genre: Electronic
- Length: 44:22
- Label: Ultra

Yuksek chronology
| Away from the Sea (2009) | Living on the Edge of Time (2011) |

Singles from Living on the Edge of Time
- 1. "Off the Wall" Released: 28 February 2012; 2. "The Edge" Released: 10 July 2012

Professional ratings
Review scores
| Source | Rating |
|---|---|
| Allmusic | 4/5 stars |
| PopMatters | 7/10 |

Living on the Edge of Time is the second studio album by French electro house musician Yuksek. It was released in July 2011 under Ultra Records.

== Track list ==
| No. | Title | Length |
|---|---|---|
| 1. | "Always on the Run" | 3:43 |
| 2. | "White Keys" | 3:24 |
| 3. | "Off the Wall" | 3:24 |
| 4. | "On a Train" | 4:02 |
| 5. | "Say a Word" | 3:08 |
| 6. | "To See You Smile" | 3:06 |
| 7. | "The Edge" | 5:52 |
| 8. | "Fireworks" | 4:23 |
| 9. | "Miracle" | 4:06 |
| 10. | "You Should Talk" | 4:01 |
| 11. | "Dead or Alive" | 5:13 |

iTunes bonus version
| No. | Title | Length |
|---|---|---|
| 12. | "On a Train (Magician remix)" | 4:43 |
| 13. | "Always on the Run (Acid Washed remix)" | 6:41 |
| 14. | "Off the Wall (Brodinski remix)" | 4:36 |
| 15. | "The Edge (Aeroplane remix)" | 6:11 |
