= Startisha =

Studio album by Naeem
- Released: June 12, 2020
- Length: 33:19
- Label: 37d03d
- Producer: Sam Green; Ryan Olson; Grave Goods; Damian Taylor; Chris McLaughlin

Naeem chronology
Everything Is Boring and Everyone Is a Fucking Liar (2011)	Startisha (2020)

Professional ratings
Aggregate scores
Source	Rating
Metacritic	77/100
Review scores
Source	Rating
AllMusic	4/5 stars
Clash	8/10
Exclaim!	8/10
The Line of Best Fit	8.5/10
Loud and Quiet	6/10
Pitchfork	7/10

Startisha is the third studio album by American rapper Naeem Juwan, also known by his stage name Spank Rock. It was released on June 12, 2020, under record label 37d03d.

== Singles ==
The first single from the album, which features American musician Justin Vernon and Swamp Dogg, "Simulation" was released on April 16, 2020.

== Critical reception ==
Startisha was met with "generally favorable" reviews from critics. At Metacritic, which assigns a weighted average rating out of 100 to reviews from mainstream publications, this release received an average score of 77, based on 7 reviews. Aggregator Album of the Year gave the album 75 out of 100 based on a critical consensus of 8 reviews. Jackson Howard, writing for Pitchfork, described Startisha as "undeniably more personal than Naeem's previous work," and praised the song "Stone Harbor", about Naeem's longtime boyfriend, as a "sweet spot" of the album.

== Track listing ==
Startisha track listing
No.	Title	Producer(s)	Length
1.	"You and I"	Sam Green; Ryan Olson; Naeem Juwan; Grave Goods; Damian Taylor; Chris McLaughlin	2:39
2.	"Simulation" (featuring Justin Vernon & Swamp Dogg)	Tom Richman; Green; Olson; Juwan; Morris; Goods; Taylor; McLaughlin	4:04
3.	"Let US Rave" (featuring Velvet Negroni)	Richman; Green; Olson; Juwan; Morris; Goods; Taylor; McLaughlin	2:39
4.	"Woo Woo Woo" (featuring Amanda Blank & Micah James)	Green; Olson; Juwan; Goods; Taylor	3:57
5.	"Us"	Green; Olson; Juwan; Goods; Taylor; McLaughlin	3:20
6.	"Stone Harbor"	Green; Olson; Juwan; Goods; Taylor; McLaughlin	3:26
7.	"Right Here"	Green; Olson; Juwan; Matti Free; Goods; Taylor; McLaughlin	2:47
8.	"Startisha"	Green; Olson; Juwan; Goods; Taylor; McLaughlin	5:43
9.	"Tiger Song"	Green; Olson; Juwan; Goods; Taylor; McLaughlin	4:44
