= Leather Wings =

Studio album by Japanther
- Released: 2003
- Genre: Lo-fi punk rock, noise rock
- Length: 35:18
- Label: Menlo Park

Japanther chronology
South of Northport EP (2002)	Leather Wings (2003)	Dump the Body in Rikki Lake (2003)

Leather Wings is an album by Japanther. It was released by Menlo Park Recordings in 2003. The album was given 7.2 out of 10 in a review by Pitchfork Media.

== Track listing ==
1. "Leather Wings" – 1:12
2. "Buried Alive" – 2:50
3. "Pleased to Meet You" – 3:16
4. "Blood of the Panther" – 1:10
5. "16 Stories High" – 5:27
6. "Super Loser" – 4:02
7. "South of Northport" – 3:59
8. "TV Nightmare" – 1:13
9. "Metal Bike" – 3:44
10. "Lazer Shot" – 1:11
11. "...Of Dogs" – 2:58
12. "Dedicated" – 2:46
13. untitled – 1:39
