= Everything Is Boring and Everyone Is a Fucking Liar =

Studio album by Spank Rock
- Released: September 27, 2011
- Genre: Hip hop; electronic
- Length: 41:27
- Label: Bad Blood
- Producer: Boys Noize; Le1f; Squeaky Clean; XXXChange; Mark Ronson; Charles Martucci; Christopher Devlin; Savage Skulls; Tyler Pope; Zeb

Spank Rock chronology
| YoYoYoYoYo (2006) | Everything Is Boring and Everyone Is a Fucking Liar (2011) | Startisha (2020) |

Singles from Everything Is Boring and Everyone Is a Fucking Liar
- 1. "Energy" Released: 2011; 2. "Car Song" Released: 2011

Everything Is Boring and Everyone Is a Fucking Liar is the second studio album by Spank Rock. It was released through Bad Blood Records on September 27, 2011. It peaked at number 14 on the Billboard Top Dance/Electronic Albums chart. Its lead single, "Energy", is on the soundtrack for 2011 video game FIFA 12.

== Critical reception ==
Professional ratings
Aggregate scores
| Source | Rating |
|---|---|
| Metacritic | 60/100 |
Review scores
| Source | Rating |
| AllMusic | 4/5 stars |
| Drowned in Sound | 7/10 |
| MusicOMH | 3/5 stars |
| NME | 4/10 |
| Pitchfork | 3.5/10 |
| PopMatters | 4/10 stars |
| Rolling Stone | 3.5/5 stars |
| Spin | 7/10 |

At Metacritic, which assigns a weighted average score out of 100 to reviews from mainstream critics, the album received an average score of 60, based on 13 reviews, indicating "mixed or average reviews".

John Bush of AllMusic gave the album 4 out of 5 stars, writing, "There's less of a party atmosphere, sometimes literally (since there are few guests), although there's still plenty of rhyming about girls and substances backed by martial snares and metronome bass claps." Philip Bloomfield of Drowned in Sound described the album as "a bold, brash, varied, slightly confused dance record with flashes of hip-hop." Will Hermes of Rolling Stone commented that "if there's a guiding spirit here, it's 1980s Prince: wildly funky pop music led by an impressive creative hard-on." Puja Patel of Spin wrote, "Employing a variety of producers, Everything undertakes a cathartic reinvention via late-night, sex-driven trips through dim, sweaty basement parties."

Meanwhile, Nate Patrin of Pitchfork was critical, writing, "[Spank Rock's] rhymes are occasionally vaguely political, sometimes intentionally disingenuous, but never confident enough to tell you just where he stands." David Amidon of PopMatters mirrored this, stating, "Everything Is Boring sounds very uninspired, very trapped in its moment, very everything YoYoYoYoYo succeeded in being the opposite of." Sam Richards of NME commented that Boys Noize's beats "generally lack any semblance of swing or groove."

== Track listing ==
| No. | Title | Writer(s) | Length |
|---|---|---|---|
| 1. | "Ta Da" | Naeem Juwan; Alexander Ridha | 2:55 |
| 2. | "Nasty" (featuring Big Freedia) | Juwan; Ridha; Big Freedia; Le1f | 2:51 |
| 3. | "Car Song" (featuring Santigold) | Juwan; Ridha; Sam Spiegel; Santi White | 3:49 |
| 4. | "Birfday" | Juwan; Le1f | 2:37 |
| 5. | "The Dance" | Juwan; Alex Epton | 2:36 |
| 6. | "#1 Hit" | Juwan; Victor H.; Lady G; Ridha; Mark Ronson | 3:09 |
| 7. | "Turn It Off" | Juwan; Ridha | 2:20 |
| 8. | "Hennessy Youngman Skit" | Jayson Musson | 1:33 |
| 9. | "Race Riot" | Juwan; Chris Devlin; Charles Martucci; Ridha | 2:47 |
| 10. | "Baby" | Juwan; Ridha | 2:26 |
| 11. | "Hot Potato" | Juwan; Måns Glaeser; Carli L. | 3:03 |
| 12. | "Cool Shit" | Juwan; Epton; Tyler Pope | 3:50 |
| 13. | "DTF DADT" | Juwan; Jahan Zeb Malik | 4:02 |
| 14. | "Energy" | Juwan; Chris Cosgrove; Ridha | 3:29 |
| Total length: | | | 41:27 |

== Personnel ==
Credits adapted from liner notes.

- Naeem Juwan – vocals
- Boys Noize – production (1, 3, 6, 7, 10, 14), additional production (2, 4, 5, 9, 11), additional sounds (2, 4, 5, 9, 11, 12), additional guitar (14), additional bass guitar (14), additional keyboards (14), mixing
- Big Freedia – vocals (2)
- Prince Terrence – extra vocals (2), extra percussion (2)
- Le1f – production (2, 4)
- Santigold – vocals (3)
- Squeaky Clean – production (3)
- XXXChange – production (5, 12)
- Mark Ronson – production (6)
- Charles Martucci – production (9)
- Christopher Devlin – production (9)
- Savage Skulls – production (11)
- Tyler Pope – production (12)
- Zeb – production (13)
- Stephanie – additional vocals (14)
- Future People – guitar (14), bass guitar (14)
- Paul Taylor – drums (14)
- Johnny Siera – additional guitar (14), additional percussion (14)
- Dan Walker – additional guitar (14), additional percussion (14)
- Nilesh Patel – mastering
- Alex Da Corte – cover art
- Mathias Kessler – photography
- David Rudnick – art direction, design, layout, typography
- Jane Morledge – art direction

== Charts ==
| Chart (2011) | Peak position |
|---|---|
| US Top Dance/Electronic Albums (Billboard) | 14 |
