= ALB (musician) =

French electropop musician

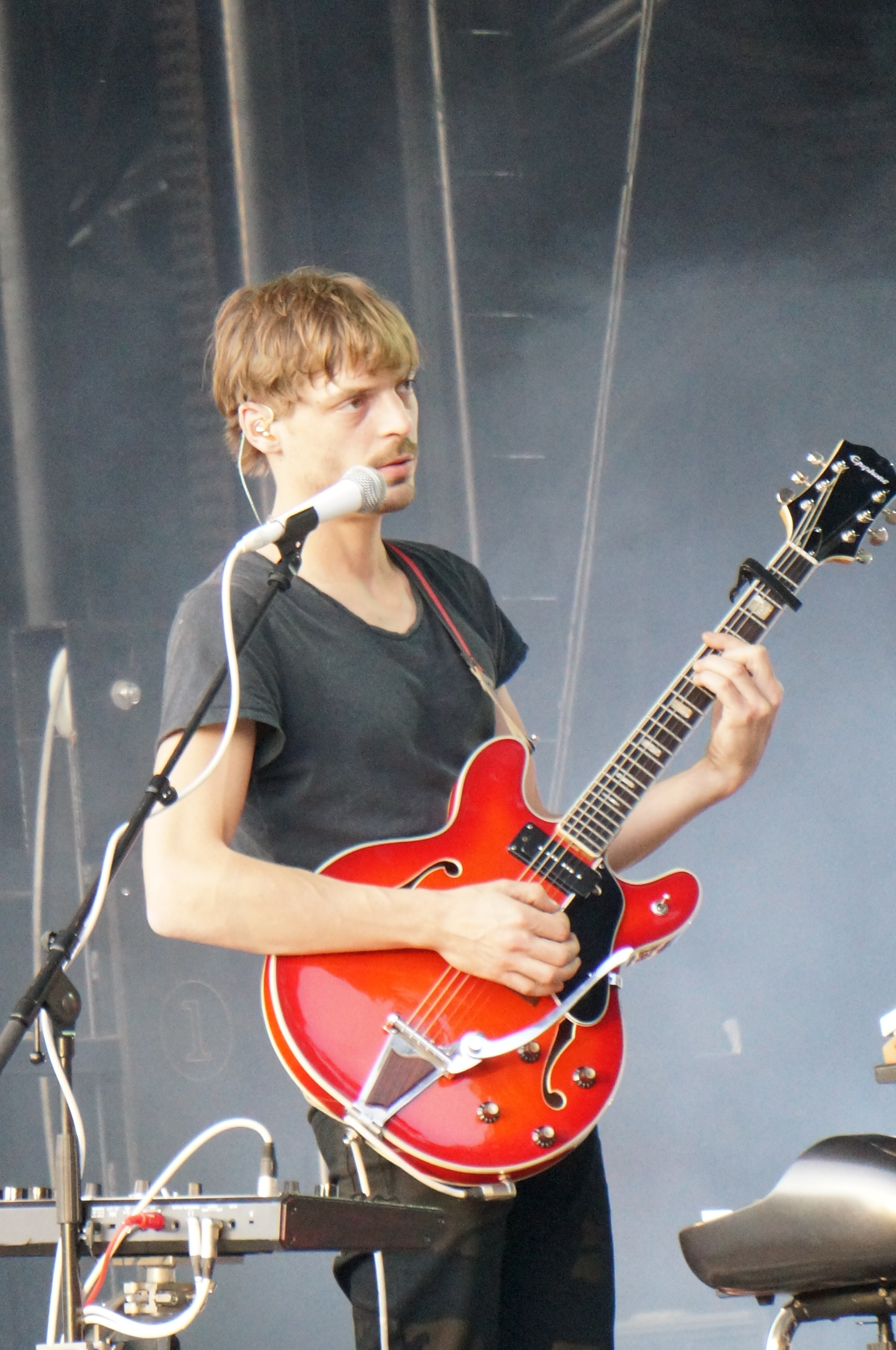
- ALB at Elektricty XII in 2014
- Born: Clément Daquin; Chauny, Aisne, France
- Occupation: Musician
- Writing career
- Years active: 2006-present
- Genre: Electro-pop

Clément Daquin, known by his stage name ALB, is a French electropop musician from Reims, France and is signed to Rise Recordings.

ALB started under that name in 2006, and his original releases were the EP CV 209 in 2006 and the studio album Mange-disque released in 2007 that included "CV 209" as a track. The album Mange-disque was marketed in an orange unique packaging designed by designer and Clément Daquin's girlfriend Emilie Vast. It was fashioned after the retro 45rpm record player called "Univox Mange-Disque" from the 1970s. Each of the songs on the album had its cover art as well.

The EP I Beg for a Summer was released on 6 June 2011. ALB's most famous hit was "Golden Chains" featuring the French band The Shoes, taken from the I Beg for a Summer EP. Automotive company Peugeot used it in 2012 in one of its major advertising campaign "I Am Your Body" in the series of ads "Let Your Body Drive" for the "Peugeot 208" model.

The song entered the French Singles Chart after airing of the ad on French television. Golden Chains's interactive music video, produced by CLM BBDO, Carnibird and ACNE Production, received several awards including the 2012 UK Music Video Innovation Award as well as several Lions in the Cannes International Festival of Creativity.

ALB has shared studios with Yuksek and has worked with Bewitched Hands, Yuksek, The Shoes, Brodinski and Monsieur Monsieur and others. Clément Daquin has been a member of The Invaders and has worked closely with Yuksek's electropop combo Klanguage. Klanguage's self-titled album was co-produced by Clément Daquin and Pierre Alexandre Busson.

== Discography ==
=== Albums ===
==== 2007: Mange-disque ====
Track list:

1. "Golden Spell"
2. "Cv 209"
3. "Safeguard"
4. "I.d.n.y"
5. "Dora maar"
6. "Reims Roubaix"
7. "48 (bercksong)"
8. "Nicaine & Cotine"
9. "Sweet Sensation"
10. "Daveg"
11. "Walter Mouse"
12. "Sunday Morning"

==== 2014: Come Out it's Beautiful ====
Track list:

1. "Golden Spell"
2. "Nature Synthétique N°01"
3. "Hypoballad"
4. "She Said"
5. "Brand New Start"
6. "Nature Synthétique N°02"
7. "Golden Chains"
8. "Never Miss You"
9. "Whispers Under the Moonlight"
10. "Ashes"
11. "Nature Synthetique N°03"
12. "Oh! Louise"
13. "Back to the Sun"
14. "The Road"
15. "Take Advice"

==== 2017: DEUX ====
Track list:

1. IDIDUDID
2. The Less I Know (The Better)
3. Scar Cycles
4. Endless Together (feat. Daisy)
5. Empathy for the Devil, Pt. 1
6. Empathy for the Devil, Pt. 2
7. I Keep on Runnin
8. Guilty Pleasure
9. The Last Word
10. Days Till Tomorrow

=== EPs ===
==== 2006: CV 209 ====
Track list:

- "CV 209" (Spirit Catcher remix)
- "CV 209" (original mix)
- "CV 209" (Yuksek remix)

==== 2011: I Beg for a Summer ====
Track list:

- "Golden Chains" (feat. The Shoes) (2:55)
- "Never Miss You" (3:27)
- "Brand New Start" (2:45
- "Show Me Your Love" (2:54)

=== Singles ===
Year	Single	Charts	Certification	Album
Year	Single	FR	Certification	Album
2012	"Golden Chains" (feat. The Shoes)	59		TBA
2014	"Whispers Under the Moonlight"	57		TBA
