= Japanther =

American punk band

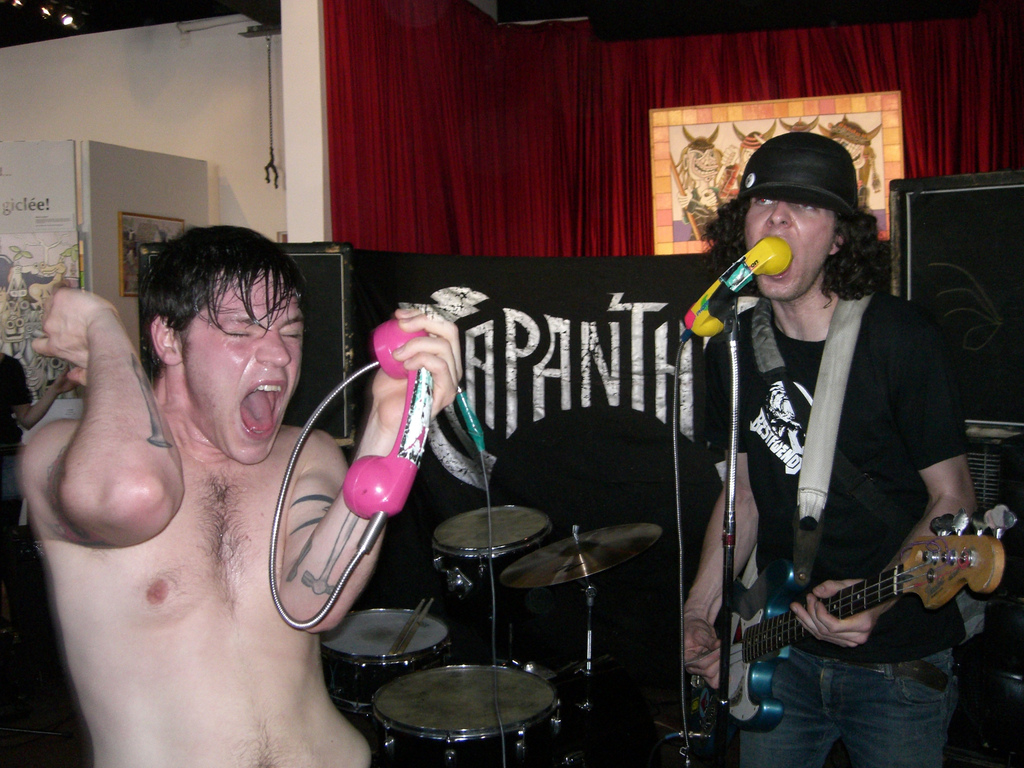

Background information
- Origin: New York City
- Genres: Noise pop, punk rock, art punk
- Years active: 2001–2014
- Labels: Menlo Park, Wäntage USA, Tapes Records, Recess, Lauren, Bufu
- Members: Ian Vanek; Matt Reilly
- Website: japanther.com

Japanther was an American punk band established by Matt Reilly and Ian Vanek, then students at Pratt Institute. Japanther was featured in the 2006 Whitney Biennial, the 2007 Performa Biennial, and the 2011 Venice Biennale, and collaborated with a diverse pool of artists such as gelitin, Penny Rimbaud, Gee Vaucher, Dan Graham, Eileen Myles, Kevin Bouton-Scott, robbinschilds, Dawn Riddle, Claudia Meza, Todd James, Devin Flynn, Ninjasonik, Annie Sparrows and Spank Rock. Japanther made its name with unique performance situations, appearing alongside synchronized swimmers, atop the Williamsburg Bridge, with giant puppets, marionettes and shadow puppets, in the back of a moving truck in Soho, and at shows with giant dinosaurs and BMXers flying off the walls.

Installations include The Phone Booth Project at The Clocktower Gallery in New York.

Described as "art-rock installation paratroopers" and "a studied form of New Wave anarchism" by Flash Art, a "Performance Galaxy" by Vanity Fair, "Super hard, incredibly fast and overall inspiring" by Thrasher, "more accessible than other bands of its genre" by the New Yorker, and "the best band ever, straight up" by Tokion, Japanther has always been a band apart, running the gamut from performance art to punk rock and back again. Pushing parties to the limit ("Lincoln Center punk-rock concert turned mini-riot" -New York Post), Japanther returned in 2011 with Beets, Limes and Rice, a celebration of ten years in the underground and an ultra-contemporary meditation on "catharsis and being in love in a time of darkness.".

The band's album Beets, Limes and Rice, written in the midst of 84-hour performance piece "It Never Seems to End," was released in digital and vinyl format from Recess Records, on CD from Japanther's own Tapes Records, on cassette from Lauren Records, and by Seayou Records in Europe. The artwork for the album was created by Monica Canilao.

Their song "Radical Businessman" was featured in the 2008 game Grand Theft Auto IV on the Radio Broker in-game radio station.

Their song "The Gravy" was featured in the 2010 skateboarding video game Skate 3.

When promoting his new musical project Howardian in 2016, drummer Ian Vanek announced that he had quit Japanther "almost three years ago", all but confirming that the band was over after 13 years.

== Discography ==
- The Last of the Living Land Pirates CD-R (2001)
- South of Northport EP (2002)
- Leather Wings (2003)
- Dump the Body in Rikki Lake (2003)
- Japanther/Panthers split 7-inch (2003)
- The Operating Manual for Life on Earth EP (2004)
- Japanther/Sneeze split 7-inch (2004)
- Japanther/Viking Club split CD (2004)
- Master of Pigeons (2005)
- Wolfenswan (2005)
- Yer Living Grave EP (2005)
- Don't Trust Anyone Over Thirty (2006)
- Japanther/ The Good Good split 7-inch (2006)
- Skuffed Up My Huffy (2007)
- Challenge 7-inch (2008)
- Chemical X Zine DVD (2008)
- Tut Tut, Now Shake Ya Butt (2008)
- Japanther/The Pharmacy split 7-inch (2008)
- Rock 'n' Roll Ice Cream (2010)
- JapantherNinjasonik 7-inch (2010)
- Beets, Limes and Rice (2011)
- Eat Like Lisa Act Like Bart (2013)
- Donut Shop Bounce EP (2014)
- Instant Money Magic (2014)
- Boom for Real (2016)

=== Compilations ===
- I Think We Should Stay Away from Each Other LP (2011)
