= Van She =

Australian electropop band

- Origin: Sydney, New South Wales, Australia
- Years active: 2002–present
- Label: Modular
- Members: Nick Routledge; Matt Van Schie; Michael Di Francesco; Tomek Archer
- Website: www.vanshe.com

Van She is an electropop band formed in early 2002 in Sydney, Australia, with Matt Van Schie (pronounced Van Ski) on bass guitar/vocals, Tomek Archer on drums/sequencer, Michael Di Francesco on synth/guitar and Nicholas Routledge on vocals/guitar. The band's debut album, V was released on the Australian label Modular Recordings in August 2008, and peaked at number 10 on the ARIA Charts.

Van She remix other artists' work both under the name Van She and as Van She Technologic.

== History ==
Van She began in 2002 when band members Nick Routledge, Matt Van Schie, Michael Di Francesco, and Tomek Archer all met through mutual friends at a club called Bang Gang in Sydney. In 2005. Van She released their self-titled, debut EP. It included the single "Sex City".

After touring with Yeah Yeah Yeahs, New Young Pony Club and playing shows with the likes of Daft Punk, Phoenix and Bloc Party, Van She released their debut studio album, V in 2008, which debuted at number 10 on the ARIA Charts. Their label introduced them as a "new band from Sydney fresh on ideas, fresher than Flavor Flav, fresh like coriander, fresher than the Fresh Prince, fresher than fresh eggs." Also in 2008, their remix (as Van She Tech) of "Something Good" by Utah Saints would become BBC Radio 1’s most played track of the year and in the 2020s would be voted the ultimate Ministry of Sound released track.

In June 2009, they released a remixed version of V, called Ze Vemixes.

The band's second studio album Idea of Happiness was released in 2012.

== Members ==
- Nicholas Routledge – vocals, guitar
- Matt Van Schie – bass guitar, vocals
- Michael Di Francesco – synths, guitar
- Tomek Archer – drums, sequencer

=== Solo projects ===
- Matt Van Schie has released songs under his own name and makes up half of the electronic music duo, Du Tonc, with Mighty Mouse. Michael Di Francesco has remixed songs under the title Arithmatix!, and released songs under the moniker Touch Sensitive.
- Nicholas Routledge has released solo music under the moniker Nicky Night Time.

== Discography ==
=== Studio albums ===
Title	Details	Peak chart positions
Title	Details	AUS
V	Released: August 2008; Label: Modular Recordings (MODCD066); Formats: CD, DD	10
Idea of Happiness	Released: July 2012; Label: Modular Recordings (MODCD153); Formats: CD, DD, LP	28

=== Remix albums ===
Title	Details
Ze Vemixes	Released: 12 June 2009; Label: Modular Recordings (MODCD109); Formats: CD, DD

=== Extended plays ===
Title	Details	Peak chart positions
Title	Details	AUS
Van She	Released: 2005; Label: Modular (MODEP012); Formats: CD, DD	87

=== Remixes ===
- Klaxons – "Gravity's Rainbow (Van She Remix)"
- Teenager – "Alone Again (Van She Tech Remix)"
- Dragonette – "I Get Around (Van She Vocal Mix)"
- Dragonette – "Pick Up the Phone (Van She Mix)"
- Feist – "1234 (Van She Tech Mix)"
- The Presets – "Are You the One? (Van She Mix)"
- Lost Valentinos – "CCTV (Bang Gang Vs. Van She Tech Remix)"
- New Young Pony Club – "Ice Cream (Van She Remix)"
- Tiga – "You Gonna Want Me (Van She Tech Remix)"
- The Bravery – "Time Won't Let Me Go (Van She Tech Remix)"
- Sneaky Sound System – "UFO (Van She Tech Remix)"
- Utah Saints – "Something Good (Van She Tech Remix)"
- Melinda Jackson – "Fall in Love (Van She Tech Remix)"
- Ladyhawke – "Back of the Van (Van She Turbo Fire Engine Mix)"
- Martina Topley Bird – "Poison (Van She Mix)"
- The Whip – "Frustration (Van She Tech Remix)"
- Das Pop – Underground (Van She Tech Remix)
- Empire of the Sun – "Walking on a Dream (Van She Tech Remix)"
- Shinichi Osawa- "Maximum Joy (Van She Tech Remix)"
- Walter Meego – "Forever (Van She Tech Remix)"
- Daft Punk – "Around the World (Nicky Van She vs.Dangerous Dan)"
- Dan the Automator and Jurassic 5 – "Evian Campaign – Rappers Delight"
- Pendulum – "Propane Nightmares (Van She Tech Remix)"
- Vandroid – "Master & Slave (Van She Tech Remix)"
- Strange Talk – "Climbing Walls (Van She Tech Remix)"
- Boys Noize – "Ich R U (Van She remix)"
- Tom Vek – "Aroused (Van She Remix)"
- Crystal Castles – "Vanished"
