= Tut Tut, Now Shake Ya Butt =

Studio album by Japanther
- Released: 2009
- Genre: Experimental punk
- Length: 37:00
- Label: Wantage

Professional ratings
Review scores
Source	Rating
The Current	Favorable
Drowned In Sound	link
Rock Sound	6/10 stars

Tut Tut, Now Shake Ya Butt is a studio album by American experimental punk band Japanther. The song "Radical Businessman" was used in Grand Theft Auto: The Lost and Damned, the add-on to the video game Grand Theft Auto IV. The album includes spoken word contributions from former Crass drummer Penny Rimbaud.

== Track listing ==
1. "Intro" – 0:51
2. "Um Like Your Smile Is Totally Ruling Me" – 2:10
3. "Bumpin' Rap Tapes" – 2:05
4. "Bloated Corpse" – 2:09
5. "Africa Seems So Far Away" – 10:53
6. "The Dirge" – 2:43
7. "The Windex" – 1:27
8. "I the Indigene" – 9:18
9. "Radical Businessman" – 2:22
10. "Before the Sun Goes Down" – 2:07
11. "Outro" – 0:55
