= Best Fwends =

US musical group

- Origin: Fort Worth, Texas
- Genres: Pop punk, emo pop, bitpop, chiptune, art punk
- Years active: 2004–present
- Labels: Moshi Moshi Records; V2 Records
- Members: Anthony Davis; Dustin Pilkington
- Website: Best Fwends on Myspace

Best Fwends are a musical group from Fort Worth, Texas. All but unknown in the United States, the duo have attracted much more notice in Europe, having been featured in a Bacardi commercial in the United Kingdom and performing at Iceland Airwaves in Reykjavík and Øyafestivalen in Norway. The song featured in the Bacardi ad is "Bedroom Music" and was the first song the group ever recorded. They have also been featured at SXSW. They have released one full-length album and two EPs on Moshi Moshi Records.

When performing live, they use only their voices and an iPod. Difficult to categorize, their music is often compared to early Beastie Boys, and has been called punk. The band, however, claim to not be talented enough to have a "sound." They are reported to use FL Studio in studio.

Recently, they recorded musical scores for several cartoons produced by Frederator Studios, including Bravest Warriors, SuperF*ckers and Our New Electrical Morals.

== Discography ==
=== Albums ===
- "Alphabetically Arranged" (2007, Moshi Moshi)
- "KRUSHER" (2009, Self Released tour CD)

=== EPs & Singles ===
- Best Fwends EP (2004, Moshi Moshi)
- EP 2 (2006, Moshi Moshi)

=== Compilations & Splits ===
- Best Fwends / The Death Set Split (2004, VLXO)
- One Inch Badge Split Series Vol. 3: Lovvers / Knyfe Hyts / Best Fwends / The Death Set (2009, OIB Recs)
- Short Attention Span Freebie spazzcore compilation (2009, Methodist Leisure Inc.)
  - "KKKK" (exclusive track)
