= YoYoYoYoYo =

Studio album by Spank Rock
- Released: April 18, 2006
- Genre: Hip hop; electronic
- Length: 41:46
- Label: Big Dada
- Producer: XXXChange; Steve McReady

Spank Rock chronology
YoYoYoYoYo (2006)	Everything Is Boring and Everyone Is a Fucking Liar (2011)

Singles from YoYoYoYoYo
- 1. "Rick Rubin" Released: 2006; 2. "Sweet Talk" Released: 2006; 3. "Bump" Released: 2006

YoYoYoYoYo is the debut studio album by Spank Rock. It was released through Big Dada on April 18, 2006. It was nominated for the 2006 Shortlist Music Prize. Its second track, "What It Look Like", was featured in the soundtrack for 2006 racing videogame Need for Speed: Carbon.

== Critical reception ==
Professional ratings
Review scores
Source	Rating
AllMusic	4.5/5 stars
The A.V. Club	A−
BBC	favorable
The Guardian	4/5 stars
IGN	8.1/10
Okayplayer	3.5/5 stars
Pitchfork	6.5/10
Tiny Mix Tapes	4/5 stars

John Bush of AllMusic gave the album 4.5 out of 5 stars, writing, "they're practically the only underground rap group to talk about sex often (and explicitly), and their tracks accept the limitations of old-school rap and bass music, but boast an agility that makes them sound positively post-millennial." Andy Battaglia of The A.V. Club stated that "The album's air of experimental austerity finds a good foil in devilish basslines and clattering rhythm runs more concerned with party-starting." Caroline Sullivan of The Guardian commented that "[Spank Rock's] debut album spans Latin party music, 1980s electro and samples lifted from primitive computer games." Kendra G. of Okayplayer wrote, "Because of the overwhelming amount of musical references they apply, Spank Rock's music is necessarily progressive, the beats, rhythms, and melodies changing and evolving frequently in the short span of each three or four minute song." Adam Webb of BBC called it "one of 2006's essential releases."

Tiny Mix Tapes placed it at number 24 on the "Favorite Albums of 2006" list. It was nominated for the 2006 Shortlist Music Prize.

== Track listing ==
All tracks are written by Alex Epton and Naeem Juwan, except where noted.

No.	Title	Writer(s)	Length
1.	"Backyard Betty"		3:28
2.	"What It Look Like"		3:06
3.	"IMC"		2:33
4.	"Rick Rubin"		3:33
5.	"Touch Me"		3:24
6.	"Bump"	Epton; Juwan; Amanda Blank; C. Messinger	5:19
7.	"Sweet Talk"		4:12
8.	"Chilly Will"		4:33
9.	"Top Billin' from Far Left"		3:53
10.	"Coke & Wet"		2:10
11.	"Competition"		3:32
12.	"Outro (Screwville USA)"		2:03
Total length:			41:46

== Personnel ==
Credits adapted from liner notes.

- Naeem Juwan – vocals
- XXXChange – production (1, 2, 4–12), mixing
- Steve McReady – production (3)
- Typical Girls – additional vocals (5, 7)
- Amanda Blank – additional vocals (6)
- Ben Folstein – additional vocals (7)
- Dave Treut – additional guitar (7)
- Rosalie Parker – additional vocals (8)
- J-Uzi – additional vocals (11)
- Hernan Santiago – mixing
- The Brent Rollins Design Explosion! – artwork
- Isaac Shel – cover photography
- Chris Lacoe – interior photography

== Charts ==
Chart	Peak position
French Albums (SNEP)	178
