= Wolf Alice discography =

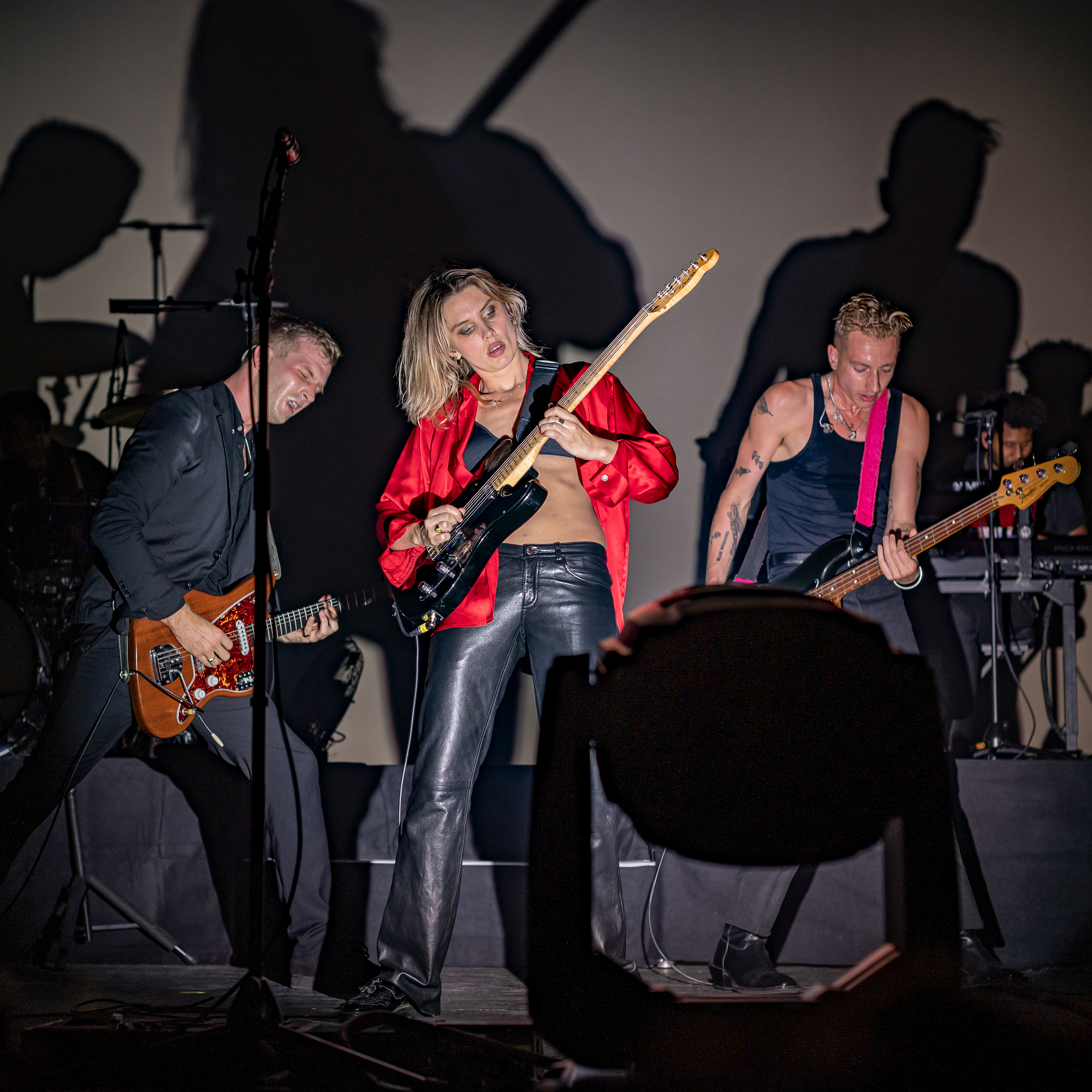
- Wolf Alice playing at The Wiltern, 2022
- Studio albums: 4
- EPs: 5
- Singles: 24

English alternative rock band Wolf Alice has released four studio albums, five extended plays and twenty four singles. The band self-released their first EP, Wolf Alice (2010). The band's second EP, Blush (2013) was released via Chess Club. The band's third EP, Creature Songs (2014) was released via Dirty Hit. The band released their debut studio album, My Love Is Cool, in 2015 via Dirty Hit. Their second studio album Visions of a Life was released under the same label in 2017. Their third studio album, Blue Weekend, was released under the same label in 2021. Following their departure from Dirty Hit, they signed with RCA and Columbia Records. They released their fourth studio album The Clearing in 2025.

== Studio albums ==
List of studio albums, with selected chart positions, sales figures and certifications
Title	Details	Peak chart positions										Sales	Certifications
Title	Details	UK	AUS	BEL (FL)	IRE	NL	POR	SCO	SPA	SWI	US	Sales	Certifications
My Love Is Cool	Released: 22 June 2015; Label: Dirty Hit; Formats: CD, LP, digital download	2	41	148	37	83	—	6	—	—	90	UK: 203,484	BPI: Gold
Visions of a Life	Released: 29 September 2017; Label: Dirty Hit; Formats: CD, LP, digital download	2	54	91	13	133	—	2	61	88	190	UK: 121,165	BPI: Gold
Blue Weekend	Released: 4 June 2021; Label: Dirty Hit; Formats: CD, LP, digital download	1	9	52	3	96	18	1	59	25	— (Note: Blue Weekend did not enter the US Billboard 200 but did peak at number 34 on the US Album Sales chart.)	UK: 157,691	BPI: Gold
The Clearing	Released: 22 August 2025; Label: RCA, Columbia; Formats: CD, LP, digital download	1	14	30	8	16	95	1	48	17	— (Note: The Clearing did not enter the US Billboard 200 but did peak at number 14 on the US Album Sales chart.)	UK: 30,136	BPI: Silver
"—" denotes a recording that did not chart or was not released in that territory.

== Extended plays ==
Title	Details
Wolf Alice	Released: 2010; Label: Self-released; Format: Digital download
Blush	Released: 7 October 2013; Label: Chess Club; Formats: CD, LP, digital download
Creature Songs	Released: 26 May 2014; Label: Dirty Hit; Formats: CD, LP, digital download
Blue Lullaby	Released: 24 June 2022; Label: Dirty Hit; Formats: Digital download
Spotify Live Room	Released: 18 April 2026; Label: Mushroom Music; Formats: 7"

== Singles ==
Title	Year	Peak chart positions										Certifications	Album
Title	Year	UK	UK Indie	BEL (FL)	CAN Rock	EST	JPN Over.	MEX Eng. Air.	ICE	SCO	US Rock	Certifications	Album
"Fluffy"	2013	— (Note: "Fluffy" did not enter the UK Singles Chart, but peaked at number 25 on the UK Physical Singles Chart Top 100.)	—	—	—	—	—	—	—	—	—		Non-album single
"She"	2013	—	—	—	—	—	—	—	—	—	—		Blush
"Moaning Lisa Smile"	2014	— (Note: "Moaning Lisa Smile" did not enter the UK Singles Chart, but peaked at number 11 on the UK Physical Singles Chart.)	— (Note: "Moaning Lisa Smile" did not enter the UK Independent Chart, but peaked at number 16 on the UK Independent Singles Breakers Chart.)	—	32	—	—	—	—	—	45		Creature Songs
"Giant Peach"	2015	— (Note: "Giant Peach" did not enter the UK Singles Chart, but peaked at number 37 on the UK Physical Singles Chart.)	47	—	—	—	—	—	—	—	—		My Love Is Cool
"Bros"	2015	157	8	58	—	—	—	—	—	90	— (Note: "Bros" did not enter the Hot Rock & Alternative Songs chart, but peaked at number 45 on the Rock & Alternative Airplay chart.)	BPI: Gold	My Love Is Cool
"You're a Germ"	2015	— (Note: "You're a Germ" did not enter the UK Singles Chart, but peaked at number 2 on the UK Physical Singles Chart.)	—	—	—	—	—	—	—	—	—		My Love Is Cool
"Freazy"	2015	—	—	—	—	—	—	—	—	—	—		My Love Is Cool
"White Leather" / "Leaving You"	2016	—	—	—	—	—	—	—	—	—	—		Non-album single
"Lisbon"	2016	—	—	—	—	—	—	—	—	—	—		My Love Is Cool
"Yuk Foo"	2017	—	—	—	—	—	—	—	—	—	—		Visions of a Life
"Don't Delete the Kisses"	2017	100	25	—	—	—	—	—	—	74	—	BPI: Platinum; ARIA: Gold	Visions of a Life
"Beautifully Unconventional"	2017	— (Note: "Beautifully Unconventional" did not enter the UK Singles Chart, but peaked at number 88 on the UK Singles Sales Chart.)	35	—	—	—	—	—	—	—	—	BPI: Silver	Visions of a Life
"Heavenward"	2017	—	—	—	—	—	—	—	—	—	—		Visions of a Life
"Formidable Cool"	2018	—	—	—	—	—	—	43	—	—	—		Visions of a Life
"Sadboy"	2018	—	—	—	—	—	—	—	—	—	—		Visions of a Life
"Space & Time"	2018	— (Note: "Space & Time" did not enter the UK Singles Chart, but peaked at number one on the UK Vinyl Singles chart.)	—	—	—	—	—	—	—	—	—		Visions of a Life
"The Last Man on Earth"	2021	— (Note: "The Last Man on Earth" did not enter the UK Singles Chart, but peaked at number 34 on the UK Singles Sales Chart.)	32	—	—	—	—	19	8	×	— (Note: "The Last Man on Earth" did not enter the Hot Rock & Alternative Songs chart, but peaked at number 33 on the Alternative Airplay chart.)	BPI: Silver	Blue Weekend
"Smile"	2021	88	14	— (Note: "Smile" did not enter the Flanders Ultratop Top 50, but charted as an extra tip on the Flanders Ultratop Bubbling Under chart.)	—	—	—	—	—	×	— (Note: "Smile" did not enter the Hot Rock & Alternative Songs chart, but peaked at number 20 on the Rock & Alternative Airplay chart.)		Blue Weekend
"No Hard Feelings"	2021	—	—	—	—	—	—	—	38	×	—		Blue Weekend
"How Can I Make It OK?"	2021	93	17	—	—	—	—	—	—	×	—		Blue Weekend
"More Than This"	2021	—	—	—	—	—	—	—	—	x	—		InVersions 80s
"Bloom Baby Bloom"	2025	65	—	—	—	113	—	—	—	x	— (Note: "Bloom Baby Bloom" did not enter the Hot Rock & Alternative Songs chart, but peaked at number 36 on the Rock & Alternative Airplay chart.)		The Clearing
"The Sofa"	2025	— (Note: "The Sofa" did not enter the UK Singles Chart, but peaked at number 20 on the UK Singles Sales Chart.)	—	—	—	132	—	—	—	x	—		The Clearing
"White Horses"	2025	— (Note: "White Horses" did not enter the UK Singles Chart, but peaked at number 72 on the UK Singles Sales Chart.)	—	—	21	134	20	—	—	x	— (Note: "White Horses" did not enter the Hot Rock & Alternative Songs chart, but peaked at number 24 on the Rock & Alternative Airplay chart.)		The Clearing
"Just Two Girls"	2025	81	—	—	—	93	—	—	—	x	—		The Clearing
"Gospel Oak"	2026	— (Note: "Gospel Oak" did not enter the UK Singles Chart, but peaked at number eight on the UK Singles Sales Chart.)	—	—	—	—	—	—	—	×	—		The Clearing (B Sides)
"—" denotes a recording that did not chart or was not released in that territory. "×" denotes periods where charts did not exist or were not archived.

== Other charting songs ==
Title	Year	Peak chart positions				Certifications	Album
Title	Year	UK Sales	UK Indie	MEX	SCO	Certifications	Album
"Silk"	2017	— (Note: "Silk" did not enter the UK Singles Chart, but peaked at number 86 on the UK Singles Downloads Chart.)	50	—	39	BPI: Silver	My Love Is Cool
"The Beach"	2021	—	31	—	×		Blue Weekend
"Delicious Things"	2021	—	30	24	×		Blue Weekend
"Lipstick on the Glass"	2021	—	33	—	×		Blue Weekend
"Play It Out"	2025	10	—	—	×		The Clearing
"—" denotes a recording that did not chart or was not released in that territory. "×" denotes periods where charts did not exist or were not archived.
