= List of songs recorded by Wolf Alice =

The following is a list of songs by the British alternative rock band Wolf Alice. They released a self-titled EP in 2012, followed by the "Leaving You" single. They released "Fluffy" in February 2013, then "Bros" in May. In October 2013, they released the Blush EP. In May 2014 they released the Creature Songs EP. Their debut album My Love Is Cool was released on 22 June 2015.

== Songs ==
| Title | Year | Album | Length | Notes |
|---|---|---|---|---|
| "90 Mile Beach" | 2013 | Blush EP | 3:45 | |
| "After the Zero Hour" | 2017 | Visions of a Life | 3:24 | |
| "A&E" | 2011 | Wolf Alice EP | 4:07 | Features a folk singer Michael Kiwaunka.; Almost released in the band called Clean Bandit's single in 2012. |
| "Another Girl, Another Planet" | 2020 | Songs for the National Health Service | 2:32 | |
| "Baby Ain't Made of China" | 2015 | B-side to the "You're a Germ" single | 3:37 | |
| "Bad Things" | 2017 | Visions of a Life bonus 7" single | 1:11 | A demo recorded in 2016 |
| "The Beach" | 2021 | Blue Weekend | 2:35 | |
| "The Beach II" | 2021 | Blue Weekend | 3:39 | |
| "Beautifully Unconventional" | 2017 | Visions of a Life | 2:13 | |
| "Blush" | 2013 | Blush EP | 4:19 | |
| "Bros" | 2013 | Single, My Love Is Cool | 4:02 | Released as a single in 2013; A demo version was recorded in 2012 |
| "Delicious Things" | 2021 | Blue Weekend | 5:04 | |
| "Destroy Me" | 2012 | Wolf Alice EP | 2:29 | Song from their debut, self-released Wolf Alice EP |
| "Don't Delete the Kisses" | 2017 | Visions of a Life | 4:35 | Debuted on Beats 1 |
| "Every Cloud" | 2013 | B-side to the "Bros" single | 2:54 | Originally released on the Wolf Alice EP |
| "Feeling Myself" | 2021 | Blue Weekend | 4:43 | |
| "Fluffy" | 2013 | Single, My Love Is Cool | 2:44 | |
| "Formidable Cool" | 2017 | Visions of a Life | 3:33 | |
| "Freazy" | 2015 | My Love Is Cool | 3:14 | |
| "Ghoster" | 2016 | Ghostbusters soundtrack | 2:30 | |
| "Giant Peach" | 2015 | My Love Is Cool | 4:35 | Previously named "Jam" |
| "Heavenly Creatures" | 2014 | Creature Songs EP | 3:18 | |
| "Heavenward" | 2017 | Visions of a Life | 4:55 | |
| "How Can I Make It OK?" | 2021 | Blue Weekend | 4:47 | |
| "I Am Disaster" | 2012 | Unreleased demo | 4:26 | |
| "I Saw You (In a Corridor)" | 2015 | B-side to the "Giant Peach" single | 2:42 | |
| "In the Bleak Midwinter" | 2021 | Single | 4:20 | |
| "The Last Man on Earth" | 2021 | Blue Weekend | 4:21 | Lead single from Blue Weekend |
| "Leaving You" | 2012 | Single | 3:18 | |
| "Lipstick on the Glass" | 2021 | Blue Weekend | 4:07 | |
| "Lisbon" | 2015 | My Love Is Cool | 4:57 | |
| "Moaning Lisa Smile" | 2014 | Creature Songs EP | 2:40 | |
| "My London Now" | 2011 | Unreleased demo | | |
| "No Hard Feelings" | 2021 | Blue Weekend | 2:35 | |
| "Nosedive" | 2013 | Blush EP | 2:47 | |
| "Planet Hunter" | 2017 | Visions of a Life | 3:53 | |
| "Play the Greatest Hits" | 2021 | Blue Weekend | 2:27 | |
| "Roar" | 2013 | Unreleased cover | 3:50 | Cover of "Roar" by Katy Perry |
| "Sadboy" | 2017 | Visions of a Life | 4:12 | |
| "Safe from Heartbreak (If You Never Fall in Love)" | 2021 | Blue Weekend | 2:32 | |
| "She" | 2013 | Blush EP | 3:12 | |
| "Sid" | 2011 | Unreleased demo | | |
| "Silk" | 2015 | My Love Is Cool | 4:03 | |
| "Six" | 2011 | Unreleased demo | | A video for it was made in April 2011 |
| "Sky Musings" | 2017 | Visions of a Life | 2:58 | |
| "Smile" | 2021 | Blue Weekend | 3:16 | |
| "Soapy Water" | 2015 | My Love Is Cool | 3:42 | |
| "Space & Time" | 2017 | Visions of a Life | 2:27 | |
| "St. Purple & Green" | 2017 | Visions of a Life | 4:22 | |
| "Sticks 'n Stones" | 2011 | Unreleased demo | | |
| "Storms" | 2014 | Creature Songs EP | 3:25 | |
| "Swallowtail" | 2015 | My Love Is Cool | 5:41 | |
| "Tassle Man" | 2012 | | 2:45 | Features Austin Williams from Swim Deep |
| "The Roots" | 2011 | B-side to the "A&E" single | 2:57 | |
| "Turn to Dust" | 2015 | My Love Is Cool | 3:08 | |
| "Visions of a Life" | 2017 | Visions of a Life | 7:57 | |
| "We're Not the Same" | 2014 | Creature Songs EP | 3:05 | |
| "Wednesday" | 2011 | Wolf Alice EP | 4:03 | |
| "White Leather" | 2013 | B-side to the "Fluffy" single | 2:36 | |
| "The Wonderwhy" | 2015 | My Love Is Cool | 4:03 | 6:47 including hidden track |
| "You're a Germ" | 2015 | My Love Is Cool | 2:53 | |
| "Your Loves Whore" | 2015 | My Love Is Cool | 4:57 | |
| "Yuk Foo" | 2017 | Visions of a Life | 2:12 | 2016 demo released on album's bonus 7" single |
