= Glastonbury Festival 2022 =

Edition of British arts festival

- Date: 22–26 June 2022
- Locations: Worthy Farm, Pilton, Somerset, England
- Previous event: Glastonbury Festival 2019
- Next event: Glastonbury Festival 2023
- Website: glastonburyfestivals.co.uk

The 2022 Glastonbury Festival of Contemporary Performing Arts took place between 22 and 26 June. The three headlining acts were Billie Eilish, Kendrick Lamar and Paul McCartney, with Diana Ross performing in the Legends slot.

This was the first in-person festival since 2019 with the previous two editions being cancelled due to the COVID-19 pandemic, known as enforced "fallow" years.

== Background ==
Following the conclusion of the 2019 Glastonbury Festival on 30 June 2019, it was announced that plans were underway for the 2020 Festival, which would celebrate Glastonbury's 50th anniversary. Headliners Paul McCartney, Kendrick Lamar and Taylor Swift, along with Diana Ross in the Legend's slot, were announced alongside a host of other acts. However, as the COVID-19 pandemic began to worsen, the ability for the festival to go ahead was put into doubt. Emily Eavis stated in an interview on 12 March 2020, that she was hopeful that the festival would not be cancelled but just six days later on 18 March 2020, 5 days prior to the first UK COVID-19 lockdown, Glastonbury officially announced that the 2020 edition which was due to celebrate its 50th anniversary would be cancelled. As a replacement to the festival, Worthy Farm recorded several short sets with artists in a COVID-safe environment and broadcast them together as a film titled Live from Worthy Farm which streamed on both the Glastonbury website and BBC Two. Due to continued uncertainty around the pandemic, the 2021 Glastonbury Festival was also cancelled.

In October 2021, Billie Eilish was announced as one of the 2022 headliners, replacing Swift and becoming the youngest headliner in the festival's history. The first wave of the line-up was announced on 4 March 2022, revealing that McCartney, Lamar and Ross would still be performing in their previously confirmed roles. The rest of the line-up was released on 30 May 2022.

== Tickets ==
General admission tickets for the festival cost £280 for the full weekend and sold out.

== Weather ==
The weather was around 20 °C on 22 June the first day of the festival with some light rain on the Friday, Saturday, and Sunday with peak temperatures of 18 to 20 °C.

== Line-up ==
=== Pyramid stage ===
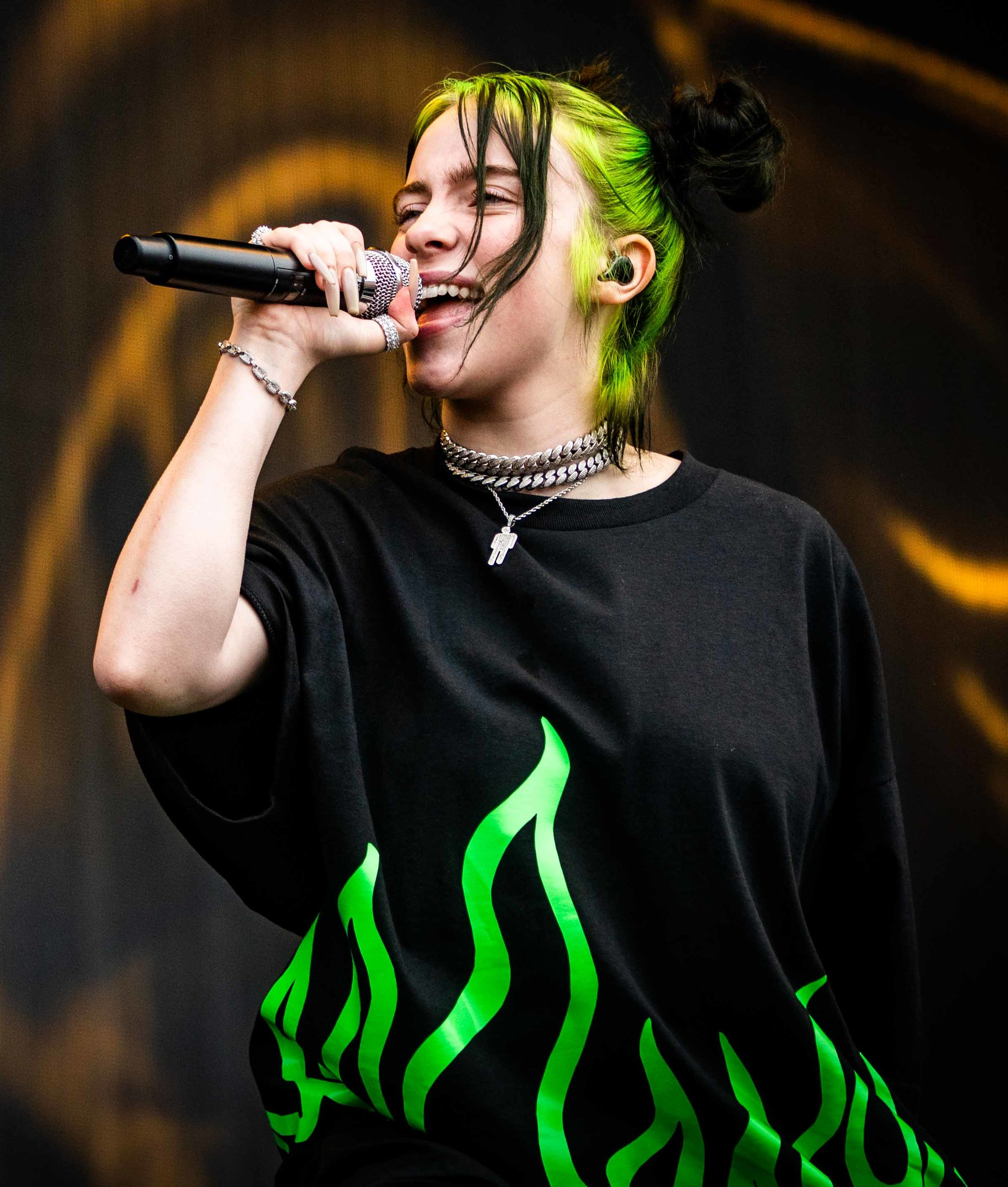
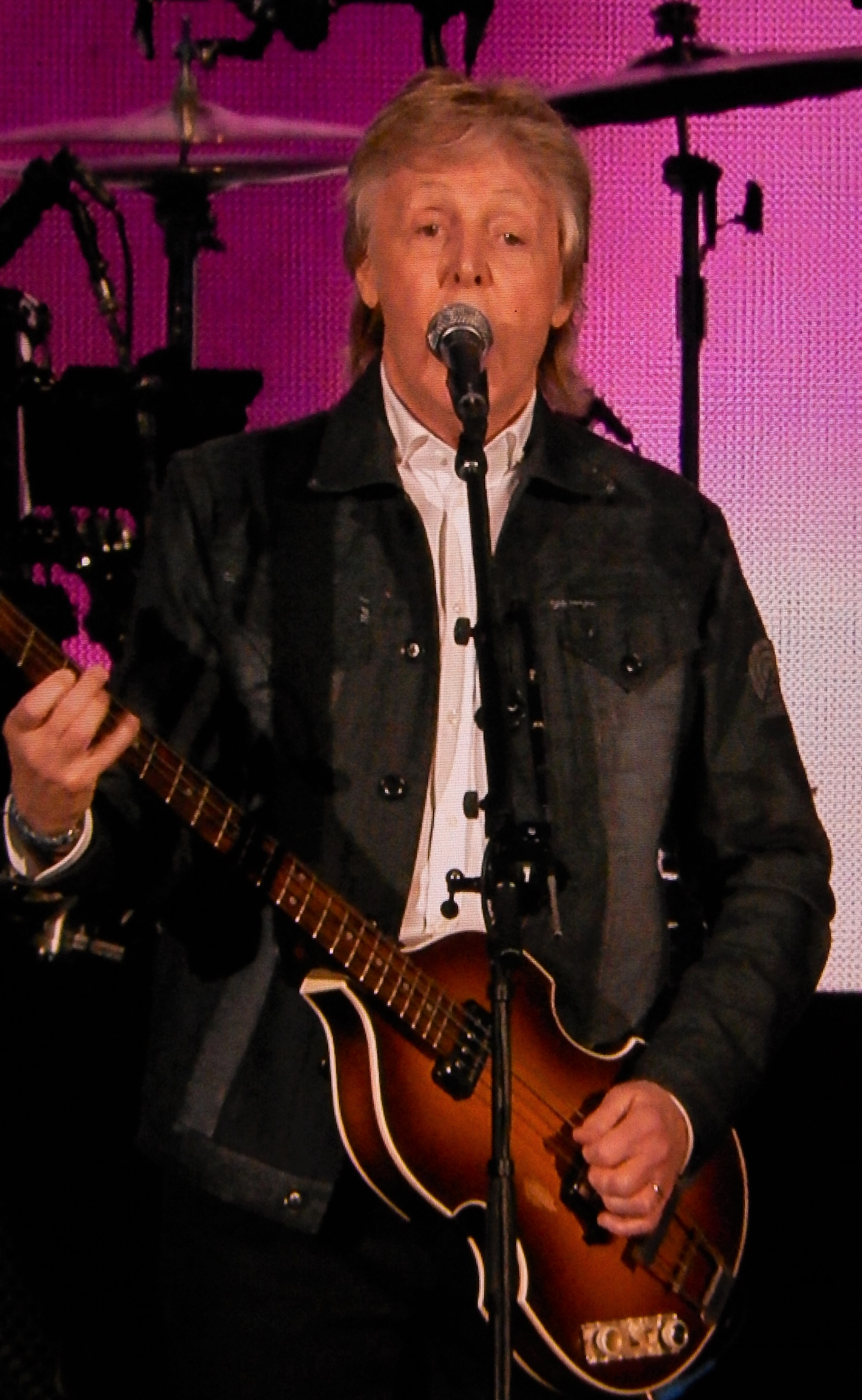
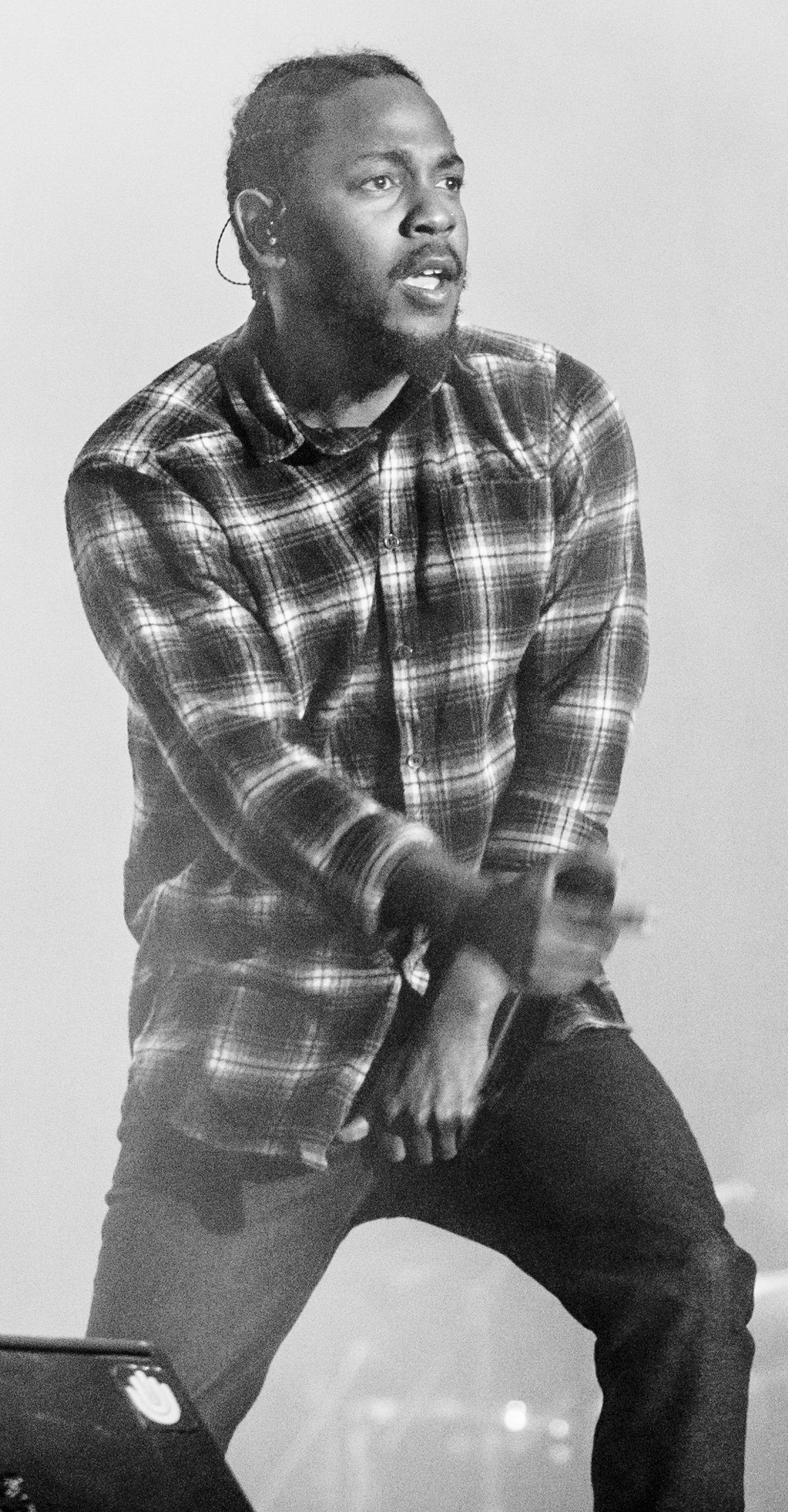
Pyramid Stage headliners Billie Eilish, Paul McCartney and Kendrick Lamar.

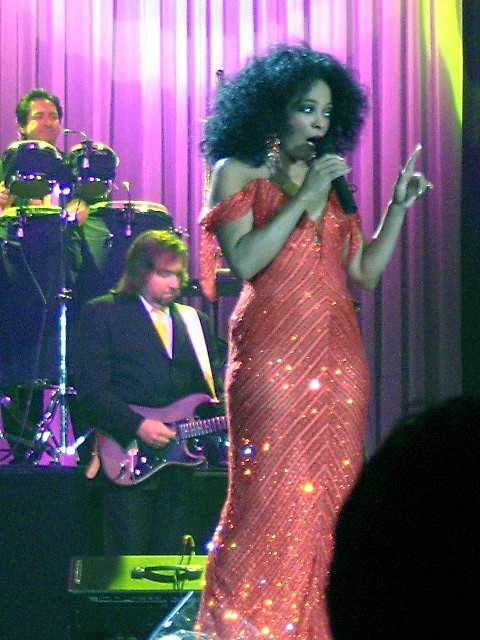
Diana Ross performed in the iconic "Sunday Legends'" slot.

Friday	Saturday	Sunday
Billie Eilish^{[A]} 22:15 – 23:45; Sam Fender; 20:15 – 21:15; Robert Plant and Alison Krauss; 18:15 – 19:15; Wolf Alice; 16:45–17:45; Crowded House; 15:15 – 16:15; Rufus Wainwright; 13:45–14:45; Ziggy Marley; 12:15–13:15	Paul McCartney^{[E]} 21:45 – 23:45; Noel Gallagher's High Flying Birds; 19:15 – 20:30; Haim^{[D]} 17:30 – 18:30; AJ Tracey^{[C]} 16:00 – 16:45; Easy Life^{[B]} 14:30 – 15:30; Joy Crookes; 13:15 – 14:00; Les Amazones d'Afrique; 11:00 – 12:45	Kendrick Lamar; 21:45 – 23:15; Lorde^{[G]} 19:30 – 20:45; Elbow; 17:45 – 18:45; Diana Ross; 16:00 – 17:15; Herbie Hancock^{[F]} 14:00 – 15:00; DakhaBrakha; 12:45 – 13:30; Black Dyke Band; 11:30 – 12:15

A. Billie Eilish's set also featured her brother Finneas O'Connell.
B. Easy Life's set featured an appearance from Kevin Abstract.
C. AJ Tracey's set featured an appearance from Aitch.
D. Haim's set was preceded by an appearance from Greta Thunberg.
E. Paul McCartney's set featured appearances by Dave Grohl and Bruce Springsteen.
F. Herbie Hancock's set featured Terence Blanchard.
G. Lorde's set featured appearances by Clairo and Arlo Parks.

Pyramid Stage Set Lists
Rufus Wainwright
- 1. Damsel in Distress
- 2. Unfollow the Rules
- 3. the People That Love
- 4. Romantical Man
- 5. Peaceful Afternoon
- 6. Early Morning Madness
- 7. You Ain't Big
- 8. Over the Rainbow
- 9. Devils and Angels (Hatred)
- 10. The Art Teacher
- 11. I Think I'm Gonna Like It Here/Maybe
- 12. Going to a Town
Crowded House
- 1. Distant Sun
- 2. World Where You Live
- 3. Fall at Your Feet
- 4. Pineapple Head
- 5. Show Me the Way
- 6. It's Only Natural
- 7. When You Come
- 8. Better Be Home Soon
- 9. Four Seasons in One Day
- 10. Weather with You
- 11. Don't Dream It's Over
- 12. I Got You
Wolf Alice
- 1. Smile
- 2. You're a Germ
- 3. Formidable Cool
- 4. Delicious Things
- 5. Lipstick on the Glass
- 6. Bros
- 7. Safe from Heartbreak (If You Never Fall in Love)
- 8. How Can I Make It OK?
- 9. Play the Greatest Hits
- 10. Silk
- 11. Giant Peach
- 12. The Last Man on Earth
- 13. Don't Delete the Kisses
Robert Plant and Alison Krauss
- 1. Rich Woman
- 2. Quattro (World Drifts In)
- 3. Fortune Teller
- 4. Rock and Roll
- 5. Please Read the Letter
- 6. Trouble with My Lover
- 7. High and Lonesome
- 8. It Don't Bother Me
- 9. Gone Gone Gone (Done Moved On)
- 10. The Battle of Evermore
- 11. When the Levee Breaks
Sam Fender
- 1. Will We Talk?
- 2. Getting Started
- 3. The Borders
- 4. Spice
- 5. Howdon Aldi Death Queue
- 6. Get You Down
- 7. Spit of You
- 8. Seventeen Going Under
- 9. The Dying Light
- 10. Saturday
- 11. Hypersonic Missiles
Billie Eilish
- 1. Bury a Friend
- 2. I Didn't Change My Number
- 3. NDA
- 4. Therefore I Am
- 5. My Strange Addiction
- 6. I Don't Wanna Be You Anymore
- 7. Lovely
- 8. You Should See Me in a Crown
- 9. Billie Bossa Nova
- 10. Goldwing
- 11. Oxytocin/Copycat
- 12. Ilomilo
- 13. Your Power
- 14. Bellyache/Ocean Eyes
- 15. Getting Older
- 16. Lost Cause
- 17. When the Party's Over
- 18. All the Good Girls Go to Hell
- 19. Everything I Wanted
- 20. Bad Guy
- 21. Happier Than Ever
Joy Crookes
- 1. I Don't Mind
- 2. Trouble
- 3. Wild Jasmine
- 4. To Lose Someone
- 5. Skin
- 6. Don't Let Me Down
- 7. Kingdom
- 8. London Calling
- 9. Feet Don't Fail Me Now
- 10. Two Nights
- 11. When You Were Mine
Easy Life
- 1. Pockets
- 2. Have a Great Day
- 3. Sunday
- 4. Daydreams
- 5. Sun
- 6. Peanut Butter
- 7. Petty Crime
- 8. Sangria
- 9. Beeswax
- 10. Dear Miss Halloway with Kevin Abstract
- 11. Ocean View
- 12. Nightmares
AJ Tracey
- 1. Triple S
- 2. Anxious
- 3. Reasonable
- 4. Lo(v/s)er
- 5. Kukoč
- 6. Cheerleaders
- 7. Psych Out!
- 8. Fashion Week
- 9. Dinner Guest
- 10. Little More Love
- 11. Rain with Aitch
- 12. Thiago Silva
- 13. West Ten
- 14. Ladbroke Grove
Haim
- 1. Now I'm in It
- 2. Don't Save Me
- 3. My Song 5
- 4. Want You Back
- 5. 3AM
- 6. Gasoline
- 7. Don't Wanna
- 8. Summer Girl
- 9. Forever
- 10. The Wire
- 11. The Steps
Noel Gallagher's High Flying Birds
- 1. Fort Knox
- 2. Holy Mountain
- 3. It's a Beautiful World
- 4. She Taught Me How to Fly
- 5. We're On Our Way Now
- 6. Black Star Dancing
- 7. Dead in the Water
- 8. Little by Little
- 9. The Importance of Being Idle
- 10. Whatever
- 11. Wonderwall
- 12. Half the World Away
- 13. Stop Crying Your Heart Out
- 14. AKA... What a Life!
- 15. Don't Look Back in Anger
Paul McCartney
- 1. Can't Buy Me Love
- 2. Junior's Farm
- 3. Letting Go
- 4. Got to Get You into My Life
- 5. Come On to Me
- 6. Let Me Roll It
- 7. Getting Better
- 8. Let 'Em In
- 9. My Valentine
- 10. Nineteen Hundred and Eighty-Five
- 11. Maybe I'm Amazed
- 12. I've Just Seen a Face
- 13. Love Me Do
- 14. Dance Tonight
- 15. Blackbird
- 16. Here Today
- 17. New
- 18. Lady Madonna
- 19. Fuh You
- 20. Being for the Benefit of Mr. Kite!
- 21. Something
- 22. Ob-La-Di, Ob-La-Da
- 23. You Never Give Me Your Money
- 24. She Came in Through the Bathroom Window
- 25. Get Back
- 26. I Saw Her Standing There with Dave Grohl
- 27. Band on the Run with Dave Grohl
- 28. Glory Days with Bruce Springsteen
- 29. I Wanna Be Your Man with Bruce Springsteen
- 30. Let It Be
- 31. Live and Let Die
- 32. Hey Jude
- 33. I've Got a Feeling
- 34. Helter Skelter
- 35.Golden Slumbers
- 36. Carry That Weight with Dave Grohl and Bruce Springsteen
- 37. The End with Dave Grohl and Bruce Springsteen
Herbie Hancock
- 1. Overture
- 2. Footprints
- 3. Actual Proof
- 4. Come Running to Me
- 5. Cantaloupe Island
- 6. Chameleon
Diana Ross
- 1. I'm Coming Out
- 2. More Today Than Yesterday
- 3. My World Is Empty Without You
- 4. Baby Love
- 5. Stop! In the Name of Love
- 6. You Can't Hurry Love
- 7. Chain Reaction
- 8. Thank You
- 9. Tomorrow
- 10. If the World Just Danced
- 11. I'm Still Waiting
- 12. Upside Down
- 13. Love Hangover/Take Me Higher
- 14. Ease On down the Road
- 15. Why Do Fools Fall in Love
- 16. Do You Know Where You're Going To
- 17. Ain't No Mountain High Enough
- 18. I Will Survive/All I Do Is Win
Elbow
- 1. Dexter & Sinister
- 2. Magnificent (She Says)
- 3. Kindling (Fickle Flame)
- 4. Empires
- 5. The Birds
- 6. Lippy Kids
- 7. My Sad Captains
- 8. Grounds for Divorce
- 9. One Day Like This
Lorde
- 1. The Path
- 2. Homemade Dynamite
- 3. Buzzcut Season
- 4. Stoned at the Nail Salon with Clairo and Arlo Parks
- 5. California
- 6. Ribs
- 7. The Louvre
- 8. Secrets from a Girl (Who's Seen It All)
- 9. Mood Ring
- 10. Cruel Summer
- 11. Liability
- 12. Sober
- 13. Royals
- 14. Supercut
- 15. Perfect Places
- 16. Green Light
- 17. Solar Power
Kendrick Lamar
- 1. United in Grief
- 2. M.A.A.D City
- 3. Money Trees
- 4. Backseat Freestyle
- 5. The Art of Peer Pressure
- 6. Swimming Pools (Drank)
- 7. Poetic Justice
- 8. Bitch, Don't Kill My Vibe
- 9. N95
- 10. Count Me Out
- 11. King Kunta
- 12. I
- 13. Alright
- 14. Institutionalized
- 15. The Blacker the Berry
- 16. DNA
- 17. Element
- 18. Silent Hill
- 19. Loyalty
- 20. Humble
- 21. Love
- 22. Savior

=== Other stage ===
Friday	Saturday	Sunday
Foals; 22:30 – 23:45; St. Vincent; 20:30 – 21:30; Idles; 18:45 – 19:45; Supergrass; 17:15 – 18:15; First Aid Kit; 15:45 – 16:45; Blossoms^{[A]} 14:15 – 15:15; Kae Tempest; 13:00 – 13:45; The Libertines; 11:30 – 12:30	Megan Thee Stallion; 22:30 – 23:30; Burna Boy; 20:30 – 21:30; Olivia Rodrigo^{[B]} 18:45 – 19:45; Glass Animals; 17:15 – 18:15; Metronomy; 15:45 – 16:45; Skunk Anansie; 14:15 – 15:15; Tems; 13:00 – 13:45; Hak Baker; 11:45 – 12:30	Pet Shop Boys^{[C]} 21:40 – 23:15; Years & Years; 19:45 – 20:45; Kacey Musgraves; 18:00 – 19:00; Fontaines D.C. 16:30 – 17:30; Declan McKenna; 15:00 – 16:00; Lianne La Havas; 13:30 – 14:30; Sea Girls; 12:15 – 13:00; Kojey Radical; 11:00 – 11:45

A. Blossoms' set featured an appearance by Melanie C.
B. Olivia Rodrigo's set featured an appearance by Lily Allen.
C. Pet Shop Boys' set featured an appearance by Olly Alexander.

Other Stage Set Lists
Pet Shop Boys
- 1. Suburbia
- 2. Can You Forgive Her?
- 3. Opportunities (Let's Make Lots of Money)
- 4. Where the Streets Have No Name (I Can't Take My Eyes Off You)
- 5. Rent
- 6. I Don't Know What You Want but I Can't Give It Any More
- 7. So Hard
- 8. Left to My Own Devices
- 9. Domino Dancing
- 10. Love Comes Quickly
- 11. Losing My Mind
- 12. Always on My Mind
- 13. Dreamland with Olly Alexander
- 14. Heart
- 15. It's Alright
- 16. Vocal
- 17. Go West
- 18. It's a Sin
- 19. West End Girls
- 20. Being Boring

=== West Holts stage ===
Friday	Saturday	Sunday
Little Simz^{[A]} 22:15 – 23:45; Bonobo; 20:30 – 21:30; Seun Kuti and Egypt 80; 19:00 – 20:00; TLC; 17:30 – 18:30; Sleaford Mods; 16:00 – 17:00; Greentea Peng; 14:30 – 15:30; Arooj Aftab; 13:00 – 14:00; Nubiyan Twist; 11:30 – 12:30	Róisín Murphy; 22:15 – 23:45; Caribou; 20:30 – 21:30; Leon Bridges; 19:00 – 20:00; Celeste; 17:30 – 18:30; Yves Tumor; 16:00 – 17:00; Black Midi; 14:30 – 15:30; Brass Against; 13:00 – 14:00; Kikagaku Moyo; 11:30 – 12:30	Bicep; 21:45 – 23:15; Angélique Kidjo^{[B]} 20:00 – 21:00; Koffee; 18:30 – 19:30; Snarky Puppy; 17:00 – 18:00; Nubya Garcia; 15:30 – 16:30; Nightmares on Wax; 14:00 – 15:00; Emma-Jean Thackray; 12:30 – 13:30; Ishmael Ensemble; 11:00 – 12:00

A. Little Simz' set featured an appearance from Cleo Sol.
B. Angélique Kidjo's set featured an appearance from Shabaka Hutchings.

=== John Peel stage ===
Friday	Saturday	Sunday
Primal Scream; 22:30 – 23:45; The Jesus and Mary Chain^{[B]} 21:00 – 22:00; Phoebe Bridgers^{[A]} 19:30 – 20:30; Sigrid; 18:00 – 19:00; Girl in Red; 16:30 – 17:30; Inhaler; 15:15 – 16:00; Griff; 14:00 – 14:45; Bad Boy Chiller Crew; 12:45 – 13:30; English Teacher; 11:30 – 12:15	Jamie T^{[D]} 22:30 – 23:45; Yungblud; 21:00 – 22:00; Ghetts^{[C]} 19:30 – 20:30; Pa Salieu; 18:00 – 19:00; Beabadoobee; 16:30 – 17:30; Self Esteem; 15:15 – 16:00; Holly Humberstone; 14:00 – 14:45; Enny; 12:45 – 13:30; Go_A; 11:30 – 12:15	Charli XCX^{[E]} 21:30 – 22:45; Little Dragon; 20:00 – 21:00; Turnstile; 18:30 – 19:30; Amyl and the Sniffers; 17:00 – 18:00; Clairo; 15:30 – 16:30; George Ezra; 14:00 – 15:00; Sports Team; 12:30 – 13:30; Just Mustard; 11:15 – 12:00

A. Phoebe Bridgers' set featured an appearance from Arlo Parks.
B. The Jesus and Mary Chain's set featured an appearance from Bridgers.
C. Ghetts' set featured appearances from Moonchild Sanelly and Pa Salieu.
D. Jamie T's set featured an appearance from Hugo White.
E. Charli XCX's set featured an appearance from Caroline Polachek.

=== Park stage ===
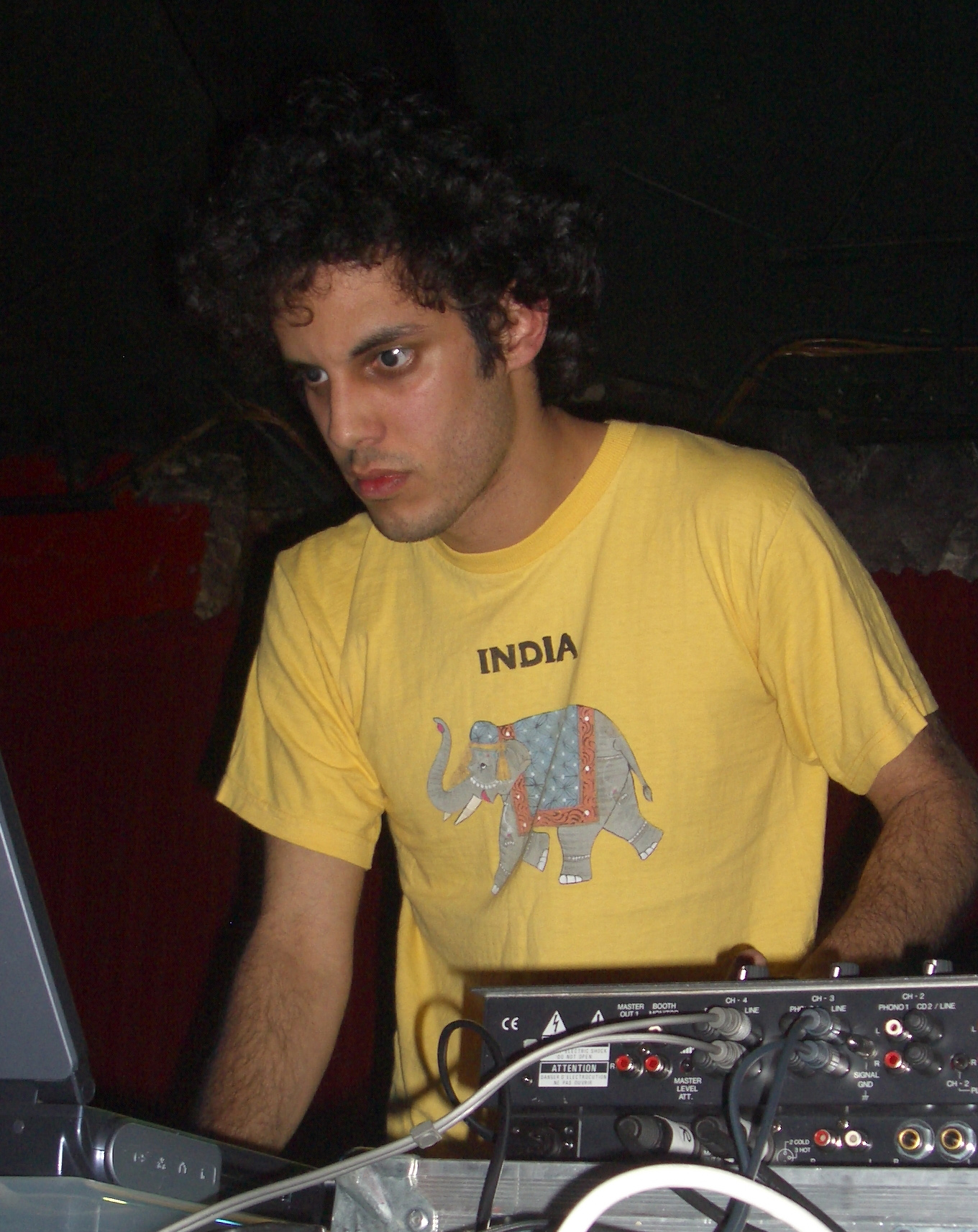
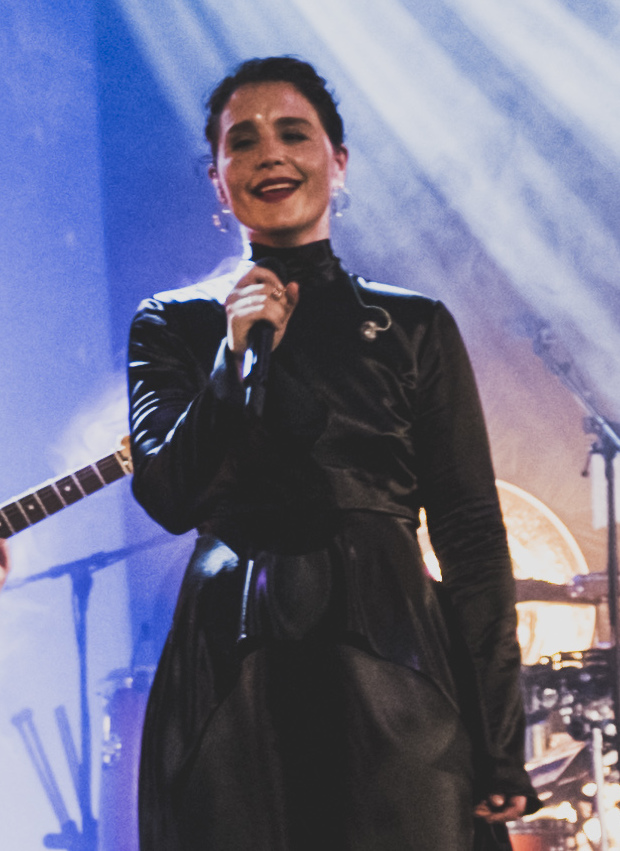
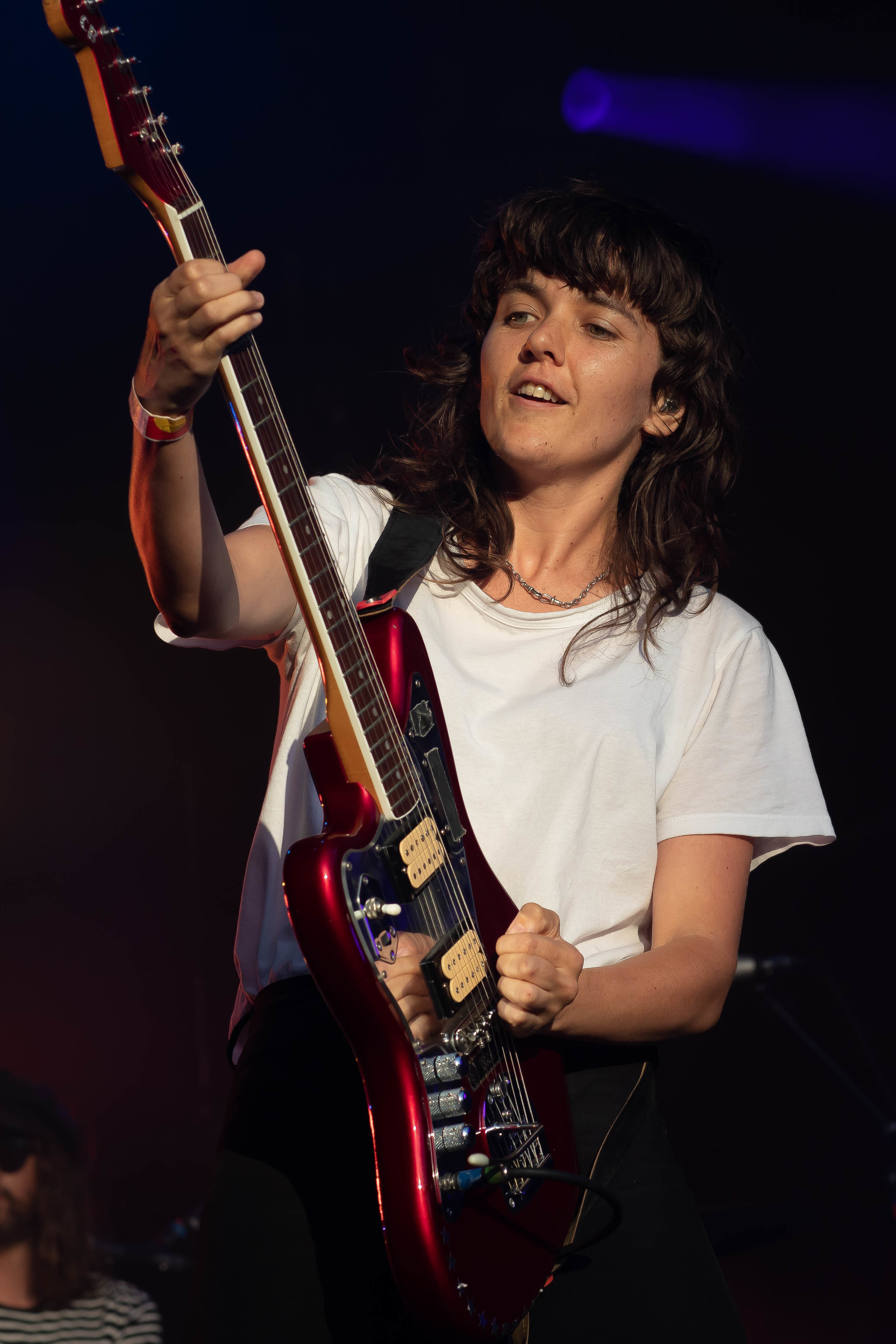
Park Stage headliners Four Tet, Jessie Ware and Courtney Barnett.

Friday	Saturday	Sunday
Four Tet; 23:00 – 00:15; Khruangbin^{[A]} 21:15 – 22:15; Saint Etienne; 19:45 – 20:45; Arlo Parks; 18:15 – 19:15; Dry Cleaning; 16:45 – 17:45; Confidence Man; 15:15 – 16:15; Wet Leg; 14:00 – 14:45; Orlando Weeks; 12:45 – 13:30; Matilda Mann; 11:30 – 12:10	Jessie Ware; 23:00 – 00:15; Mitski; 21:15 – 22:15; The Avalanches; 19:45 – 20:45; Big Thief; 18:15 – 19:15; Squid; 16:45 – 17:45; Sampa the Great; 15:15 – 16:15; Gabriels; 14:00 – 14:45; Katy J. Pearson; 12:45 – 13:30; Yasmin Williams; 11:30 – 12:10	Courtney Barnett; 21:15 – 22:30; Jarv Is; 19:45 – 20:45; Jack White; 18:15 – 19:15; Caroline Polachek; 16:30 – 17:30; Cate Le Bon; 15:15 – 16:00; Warmduscher; 14:00 – 14:45; Big Joanie; 12:45 – 13:30; Deep Throat Choir; 11:30 – 12:15

A. Khruangbin's set featured an appearance by Leon Bridges.

=== Acoustic stage ===
Friday	Saturday	Sunday
Paul Heaton and Jacqui Abbott; 21:30 – 23:00; The Undertones; 20:00 – 21:00; Hothouse Flowers; 18:30 – 19:30; Brian Kennedy; 17:25 – 18:10; Mary Coughlan; 16:25 – 17:05; The Mariachis; 15:30 – 16:10; Irish Mythen; 14:30 – 15:10; Pavey Ark; 13:40 – 14:20; Roseanne Reid; 12:45 – 13:25; Novelty Island; 12:00 – 12:30	The Waterboys; 21:30 – 23:00; Richard Thompson; 20:00 – 21:00; Scouting for Girls; 18:30 – 19:30; Tony Christie; 17:30 – 18:15; Chris Difford; 16:30 – 17:15; Grainne Duffy; 15:30 – 16:00; Laura Veirs; 14:30 – 15:10; Katherine Priddy; 13:40 – 14:20; 49th & Main; 12:45 – 13:25; Tom Webber; 12:00 – 12:30	Suzanne Vega; 21:30 – 23:00; The Shires; 20:00 – 21:00; The Bootleg Beatles; 18:30 – 19:30; Fisherman's Friends; 17:30 – 18:15; Glenn Tilbrook; 16:30 – 17:15; Damien Dempsey; 15:30 – 16:15; Errol Linton; 14:30 – 15:10; Chloë Foy; 13:40 – 14:20; Lewis McLaughlin; 12:45 – 13:25; Megan McKenna; 12:00 – 12:30

=== Avalon stage ===
Friday	Saturday	Sunday
Reef; 23:05 – 00:20; Sugababes; 21:35 – 22:35; Nick Mulvey; 20:05 – 21:05; Oh My God! It's the Church; 18:35 – 19:35; Tanita Tikaram; 17:05 – 18:05; The War and Treaty; 15:40 – 16:35; Baskery; 14:15 – 15:10; Hobo Jones & The Junkyard Dogs; 13:00 – 13:45	The Hoosiers; 23:05 – 00:15; Lamb; 21:35 – 22:35; Ward Thomas; 20:05 – 21:05; John Cooper Clarke; 18:25 – 19:40; Tom Robinson Band; 17:05 – 18:05; Molotov Jukebox; 15:35 – 16:35; Grace Petrie; 14:05 – 15:05; The Longest Johns; 12:40 – 13:35; Nia Wyn; 11:30 – 12:10	The Dualers; 22:50 – 23:50; Imelda May; 21:20 – 22:20; Orla Gartland; 19:50 – 20:50; McFly; 18:20 – 19:20; Kate Rusby; 16:50 – 17:50; P. P. Arnold; 15:20 – 16:20; Peat and Diesel; 13:55 – 14:50; Ferris & Sylvester; 12:35 – 13:30; Citizens of the World Choir; 11:30 – 12:10

=== Left Field ===
Friday	Saturday	Sunday
Billy Bragg; 21:00 – 22:00; Jamie Webster; 19:30 – 20:30; Dylan John Thomas; 18:15 – 19:00; Brooke Combe; 17:00 – 17:45	Yard Act; 21:00 – 22:00; Billy Nomates; 19:30 – 20:30; Kam-bu; 18:10 – 19:10; Asylums; 17:00 – 17:45	Yola; 21:00 – 22:00; The Regrettes; 19:15 – 20:15; The Magic Numbers; 18:00 – 18:45; Las Adelitas; 17:00 – 17:30
