= The Clearing (Wolf Alice album) =

2025 studio album by Wolf Alice

Studio album by Wolf Alice
- Released: 22 August 2025
- Studios: No Expectations (Los Angeles, California)
- Genre: Soft rock
- Length: 40:48
- Labels: RCA; Columbia
- Producer: Greg Kurstin

Wolf Alice chronology
Blue Weekend (2021)	The Clearing (2025)

Singles from The Clearing
- 1. "Bloom Baby Bloom" Released: 15 May 2025; 2. "The Sofa" Released: 11 July 2025; 3. "White Horses" Released: 8 August 2025; 4. "Just Two Girls" Released: 9 September 2025

The Clearing is the fourth studio album by English rock band Wolf Alice, released on 22 August 2025 through RCA and Columbia Records. The album follows the band's 2021 album Blue Weekend.

== Background and promotion ==
Wolf Alice wrote songs for the album in Seven Sisters, London, while recording took place in Los Angeles with American producer Greg Kurstin. The album marks their departure from Dirty Hit, the label under which they released their first three albums, and is set to be released through RCA and Columbia. The band detailed plans for their new album on 15 May 2025. In a statement, The Clearing was described as "a classic pop/rock album", drawing influence from the 1970s while remaining "rooted firmly in the present.". The announcement compared the project to "something close to if Fleetwood Mac wrote an album today in North London". It was further characterised as "both playful and serious, ironic and straight-talking", representing a deliberate step forward for the band that conveys "the freeing feeling of finding a moment of peace and clarity".

To support the album, Wolf Alice toured North America and Europe in September and October 2025. On 2 July 2026, the band released a new track "Gospel Oak" as the first of three songs from the extended version of the album, titled The Clearing: B Sides. It was released digitally on 19 August 2026, with the physical vinyl edition being released on 21 August 2026.

== Singles ==
"Bloom Baby Bloom" was released as the lead single on 15 May 2025, accompanied by a music video. The song was noted for its experimental approach, blending atmospheric soundscapes with the band's signature indie rock style. Lead singer Ellie Rowsell described it as a "rock song" inspired by Axl Rose but from a woman's perspective. She said she aimed to use her vocals as a "rock instrument" and felt she had reached a point where she no longer needed to prove herself as a musician.

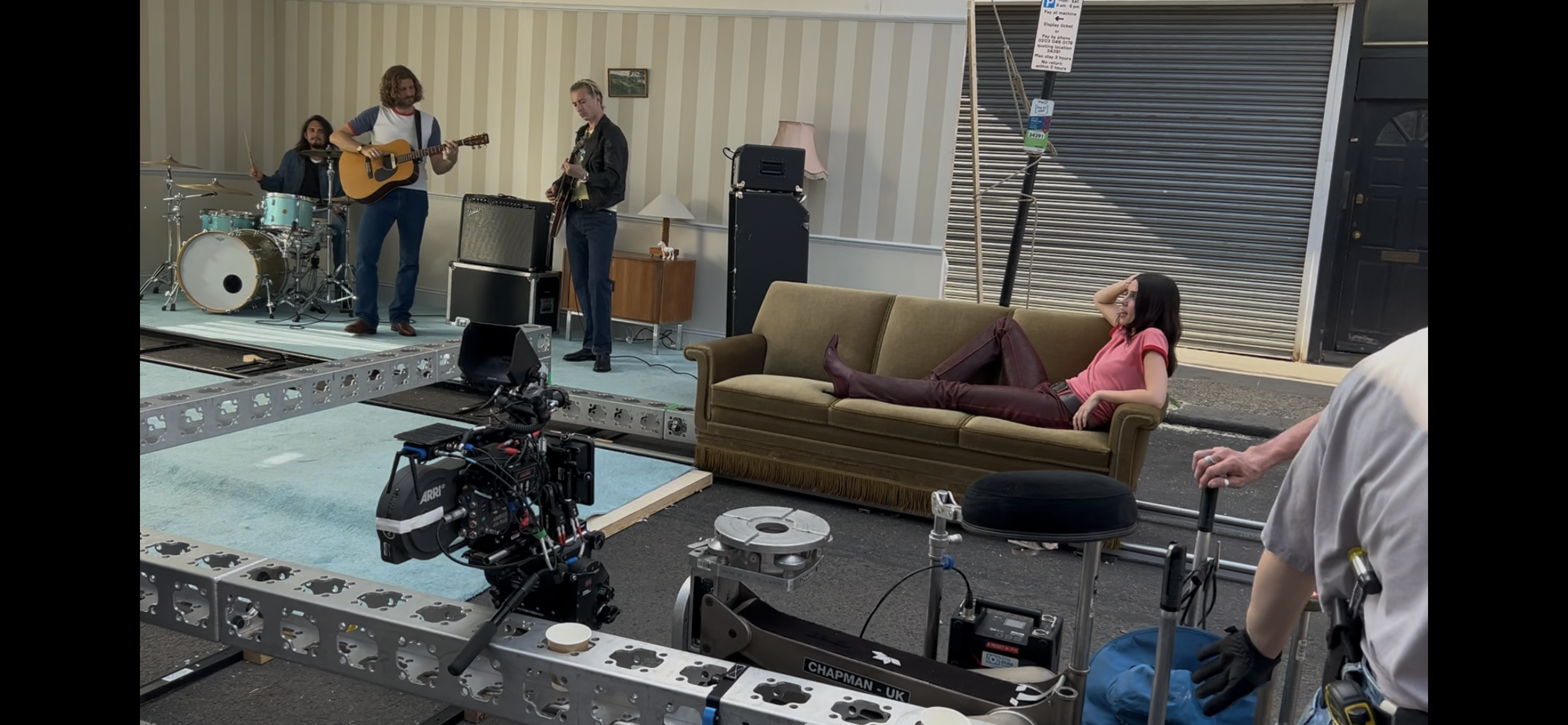
Wolf Alice recording the video for "The Sofa" in Myddleton Road, North London

The album's second single, closing track "The Sofa", was released on 11 July 2025, alongside a music video. The third single, "White Horses", featuring co-lead vocals by drummer Joel Amey, was released on 8 August 2025, accompanied by a lyric video. The music video for the fourth single, "Just Two Girls", was released on 9 September 2025 and starred Lucy Boynton alongside Rowsell.

== Critical reception ==
The Clearing reviews
Aggregate scores
Source	Rating
AnyDecentMusic?	7.8/10
Metacritic	80/100
Review scores
Source	Rating
AllMusic	4.5/5 stars
DIY	5/5 stars
Financial Times	2/5 stars
Mojo	4/5 stars
NME	5/5 stars
Paste	7.0/10
Pitchfork	7.3/10
Rolling Stone	4/5 stars
Slant Magazine	3.5/5 stars
Under the Radar	9/10

The Clearing received positive reviews from music critics. The album earned a weighted average score of 80 out of 100 on Metacritic, indicating "generally favorable reviews", based on 17 reported reviews.

In a five-star review for NME, Rhian Daly praised The Clearing for its sonic separation from Blue Weekend, featuring "more layered, nuanced, slower-tempo songs" than the band's 2021 release. For Daly, "the songwriting within them is so strong, they still make just as big an impression" as the "harder, faster side of Wolf Alice's oeuvre". Daly's review concluded by summarising The Clearing as "the kind of album that could only be written after the dust has settled on your twenties and the post-30 clarity sets in" and Wolf Alice themselves as "the kind of band that keep on getting better with every record, and here, they raise the bar on themselves once again". In a similarly glowing review, Sarah Jamieson of DIY labelled the record Wolf Alice's "boldest, most striking record yet".

Writing for Rolling Stone, Jon Dolan highlighted Wolf Alice's "sweep and depth" on The Clearing, describing the album as "steeped in classic seventies and eighties influences yet never feeling like they’re just firing up a playlist of old bangers". Comparing the record to Carole King's Tapestry (1971) and Stevie Nicks's Bella Donna (1981), Dolan cast The Clearing as "a great album about the scary experience of honestly figuring what kind of person you are — and what the world owes you for the hard work you already do". Andy Von Pip, reviewing the album for Under the Radar, named it a "a classic that shows a band confident in their evolution, unafraid to shed what no longer fits, and stepping forward with renewed purpose".

In a more critical review, Miranda Wollen of Paste opined that "Wolf Alice isn’t sure where they're heading, but they’re not stopping any time soon" on The Clearing. She derogated the album's second half as a "half-willed descent into the depths of commercialized pop-rock", but concluded that "even at its nadir, The Clearing is far from grating", praising the band's "vivid, emotive imagery" across the tracklist. Lewie Parkinson-Jones, writing for Slant Magazine, similarly stated that after the first few tracks, "The Clearing settles into a procession of mostly mellow songs built around acoustic guitars that nudge the album toward monotony". JR Moores of The Quietus praised "Bloom Baby Bloom," but went on to say, "It’s therefore painful to report that the same cannot be said for the rest of the Mercury winners’ disappointing fourth album".

== Accolades ==
On 10 September 2025, The Clearing was announced as one of 12 nominees for the 2025 Mercury Prize.

The Sunday Times ranked the album as the 13th-best of 2025, the highlight being "the wistful, beautiful 'The Sofa': as perfect a package as any song this year."

At the 2026 Brit Awards, the album was nominated for the Brit Award for British Album of the Year, and Wolf Alice won the Brit Award for British Group.

== Commercial performance ==
The Clearing debuted atop the UK Albums Chart with 30,136 album-equivalent units, earning Wolf Alice their second consecutive number-one album and fourth consecutive top-three album. It simultaneously arrived at the summit of the Official Vinyl Albums Chart.

== Track listing ==
All tracks are written by Ellie Rowsell, Joel Amey, Jonathan Oddie, and Theo Ellis; "Thorns", "Just Two Girls", and "The Sofa" written with Greg Kurstin.

The Clearing track listing
No.	Title	Length
1.	"Thorns"	3:14
2.	"Bloom Baby Bloom"	3:47
3.	"Just Two Girls"	3:49
4.	"Leaning Against the Wall"	4:11
5.	"Passenger Seat"	2:52
6.	"Play It Out"	4:11
7.	"Bread Butter Tea Sugar"	3:28
8.	"Safe in the World"	3:31
9.	"Midnight Song"	2:50
10.	"White Horses"	4:29
11.	"The Sofa"	4:26
Total length:		40:48

== Personnel ==
Credits adapted from the album's liner notes.

=== Wolf Alice ===
- Ellie Rowsell – vocals (all tracks), string arrangement (tracks 1, 6–9), synthesizers (1), piano (2, 6, 7), programming (4, 7), guitar (8); flute, string programming, bass programming (11)
- Joff Oddie – guitar (all tracks), string arrangement (1, 6–9), backing vocals (4), programming (6, 10)
- Joel Amey – drums (all tracks), string arrangement (1, 6–9), vocals (1, 7, 10), backing vocals (4, 5, 8), synthesizers (4), percussion (8, 9), guitar (10)
- Theo Ellis – bass (all tracks), string arrangement (1, 6–9); piano, backing vocals (4)

=== Additional contributors ===
- Greg Kurstin – production, recording (all tracks); percussion (1–5, 7), synthesizers (1, 2, 4, 6, 7), piano (1, 3, 5, 8), strings (1, 3), string arrangement (1, 6–9), Moog (2), Mellotron (3, 8); keyboards, Marxophone (6); baritone guitar (7)
- Julian Burg – recording
- Matt Tuggle – recording
- Mark "Spike" Stent – mixing
- Matt Wolach – mixing assistance
- Kieran Beardmore – mixing assistance
- Emily Lazar – mastering
- Songa Lee – violin (1, 6–8)
- Charlie Bisharat – violin (1, 6–8)
- Zach Dellinger – viola (1, 6–8)
- Jacob Braun – cello (1, 6–8)
- Charles Tyler – cello (1, 6–8)
- Rachel Fleminger Hudson – photography, creative direction
- Anna Mills – logo design
- Alex Bois – design

== Charts ==
Chart performance for The Clearing
Chart (2025–2026)	Peak position
Australian Albums (ARIA)	14
Austrian Albums (Ö3 Austria)	10
Belgian Albums (Ultratop Flanders)	30
Belgian Albums (Ultratop Wallonia)	114
Dutch Albums (Album Top 100)	16
French Albums (SNEP)	109
French Rock & Metal Albums (SNEP)	7
German Albums (Offizielle Top 100)	10
Greek Albums (IFPI)	87
Hungarian Physical Albums (MAHASZ)	40
Irish Albums (Official Charts)	8
Italian Albums (FIMI)	23
New Zealand Albums (RMNZ)	31
Portuguese Albums (AFP)	95
Scottish Albums (Official Charts)	1
Spanish Albums (Promusicae)	48
Swedish Albums (Sverigetopplistan)	21
Swiss Albums (Schweizer Hitparade)	17
UK Albums (Official Charts)	1
UK Independent Albums (Official Charts)	13
US Top Album Sales (Billboard)	14

== Certifications ==
Certifications for The Clearing
Region	Certification	Certified units/sales
United Kingdom (BPI)	Silver	60,000^{‡}
^{‡} Sales+streaming figures based on certification alone.
