= The Sofa =

2025 single by Wolf Alice

Single by Wolf Alice

from the album The Clearing
- Released: 11 July 2025
- Length: 4:26
- Label: RCA; Columbia
- Songwriters: Ellie Rowsell; Joff Oddie; Joel Amey; Theo Ellis; Greg Kurstin
- Producer: Greg Kurstin

Wolf Alice singles chronology
"Bloom Baby Bloom" (2025)	"The Sofa" (2025)	"White Horses" (2025)

Music video
- "The Sofa" on YouTube

"The Sofa" is a song recorded by British rock band Wolf Alice. It was released on 11 July 2025 as the second single and the final track of their fourth studio album, The Clearing, through RCA and Columbia Records.

== Composition ==
"The Sofa" was written by the group members, Ellie Rowsell, Joff Oddie, Joel Amey, and Theo Ellis, along with its producer Greg Kurstin. The group wrote the song in Seven Sisters, London then recorded it at the No Expectations studio in Los Angeles with Kurstin. Poppy Burton of NME described the track as a "contemplative" piano ballad. Rowsell further explained that the song explores the idea of not trying too hard to figure everything out. She also stated that the track addresses her effort to find peace despite plans that did not materialize.

== Critical reception ==
In his review of the track's parent album, Robin Murray of Clash noted that the track served as "a dose of realism" for the album, noting that it reflects the beginning of the group's career. In a four-star review of The Clearing, Jon Dolan of Rolling Stone compared the track to the "introspective piano pop" of Carole King's work. Will Richards of Rolling Stone UK highlighted the track as the album's best. Writing for Paste, Miranda Wollen described that the track "attempts to paint [Ellie] Rowsell as a happy-go-lucky lazy girl" and compared it to Clairo's "sad-girl charisma". Lewie Parkinson-Jones of Slant Magazine highlighted the contrast between the track’s "smooth-jazz, string-laden" arrangement and its "frank" lyrics, noting that the latter prevent the song from becoming "easy listening."

== Live performances ==
The band first performed the song as an unreleased track at the Le Nouveau Casino in Paris, France, on 3 June 2025. The show was part of a series of intimate performances held across Europe during the summer of 2025. They performed the song on their headlining tour, The Clearing Tour, in 2025–2026. They also performed "The Sofa" at the Brit Awards 2026 on 28 February, which was described by Max Pilley of NME as "bold and theatrical".

== Music video ==
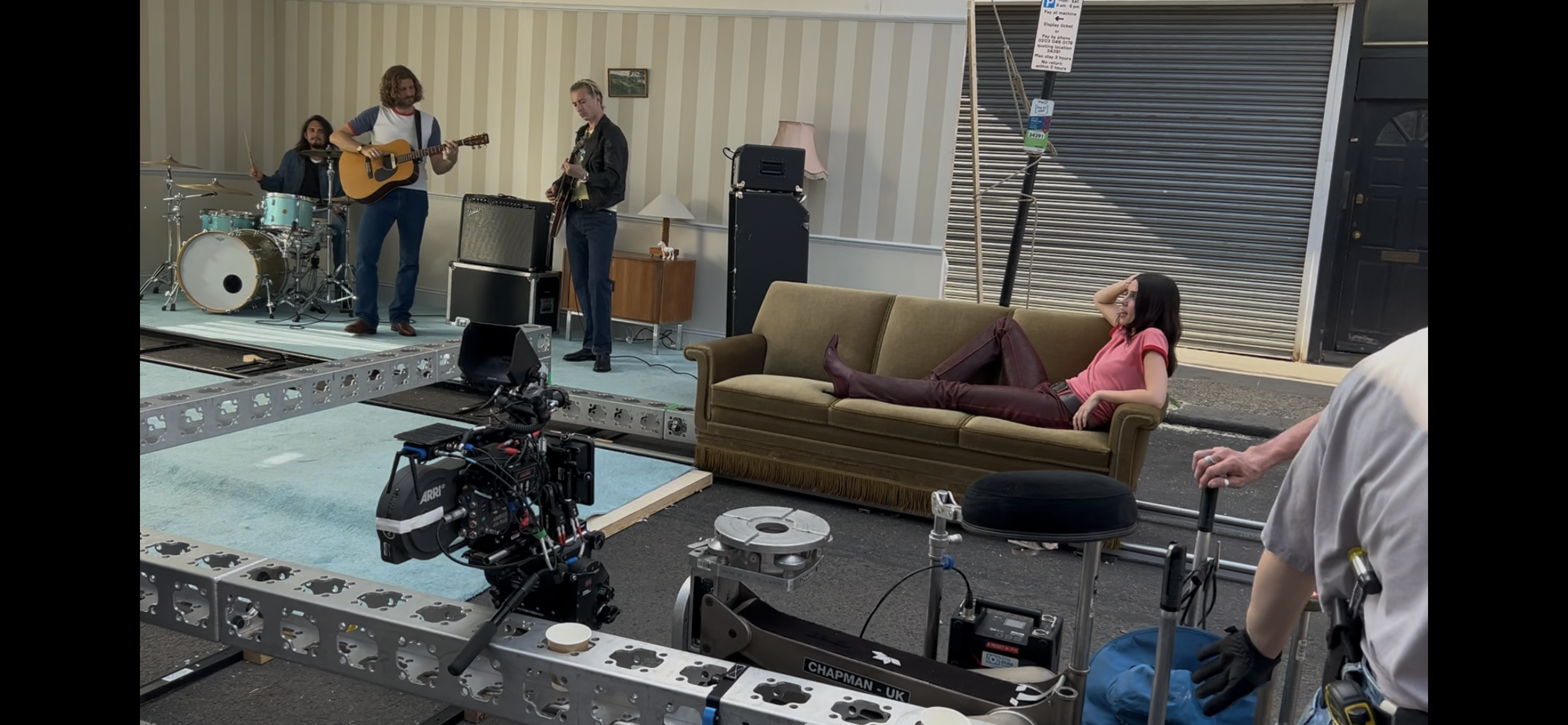
Wolf Alice recording the video in Myddleton Road, North London.

The accompanying music video for "The Sofa" was released alongside the single on 11 July 2025. Directed by Fiona Jane Burgess, it features the group members lying on a couch as it moves through the city. The video was shot on 16 mm film across various streets in North London. Regarding the video, Burgess said that when she first listened to the song, she imagined travelling on a train or bus and sitting back, which she later adapted into the concept of a sofa.

The video was nominated for Best Rock Video – UK at the 2025 UK Music Video Awards, which was ultimately won by Wolf Alice's own "Bloom Baby Bloom".

== Personnel ==
Credits obtained from Apple Music.

Wolf Alice

- Ellie Rowsell – vocals, songwriting, programming, strings, flute
- Joel Amey – songwriting, background vocals, drums
- Theo Ellis – songwriting, bass
- Joff Oddie – songwriting, guitar

Additional contributors

- Greg Kurstin – songwriting, production, piano, percussion, strings arrangement, recording
- Kieran Beardmore – mixing assistance
- Charlie Bisharat – violin
- Jacob Braun – cello
- Julian Burg – recording
- Zach Dellinger – viola
- Emily Lazar – mastering
- Songa Lee – violin
- Mark "Spike" Stent – mixing
- Matt Tuggle – recording
- Charles Tyler – cello
- Matt Wolach – mixing assistance

== Charts ==
Chart (2025)	Peak position
Estonia Airplay (TopHit)	91
UK Singles Downloads (OCC)	42
