= Space & Time (song) =

Single by Wolf Alice

from the album Visions of a Life
- Released: 8 May 2018
- Genre: Alternative rock; post-punk revival
- Length: 2:27
- Label: Dirty Hit
- Songwriter(s): Ellen Rowsell; Jonathan Oddie; Joel Amey; Theodore Ellis
- Producer(s): Justin Meldal-Johnsen

Wolf Alice singles chronology
"Sadboy" (2017)	"Space & Time" (2018)	"The Last Man on Earth" (2021)

Music video
- "Space & Time" on YouTube

"Space & Time" is a song by British alternative rock band Wolf Alice from their second studio album Visions of a Life. It was released on 8 May 2018 through Dirty Hit as the album's seventh single.

== Release and live performances ==
A day before the release of Visions of a Life on 28 September 2017, lead singer Ellie Rowsell said at Annie Mac's BBC Radio 1 show that "Space & Time" is a song about "feeling anxious and trying not to feel anxious," continuing: "Sometimes when I feel a bit low/weirdo I try to imagine my future self looking back on my past self and it kind of makes me feel better. So it’s a song about that really." The song was released on vinyl on 8 May 2018 as the seventh single from the album.

In October 2017, the band performed "Space & Time" on their KEXP and KCRW sessions. On 15 May 2018, they performed the song on BBC Radio 1's Live Lounge alongside a cover of Camila Cabello's "Never Be The Same". The song also performed on 26 May as part of Wolf Alice's set at BBC Music's Biggest Weekend streamed on BBC Radio 1 and shown on television on BBC Four.

== Music video ==
The music video for "Space & Time" was released on 30 May 2018. Directed by Rowsell herself, the video sees Rowsell running through the woods and various other locations while wearing a wedding dress. With the release of the video, Rowsell wrote that the song is "about being faced with life's obstacles and knowing that at some point you'll be looking back on yourself at this moment in time and it won't be as bad as it feels right now."

== Chart performance ==
"Space & Time" debuted at number one on the Official Vinyl Singles Chart.

== Track listing ==
- UK 7" single
1. Space & Time
2. Formidable Cool
