= Dressed Like Wolves =

Musical artist

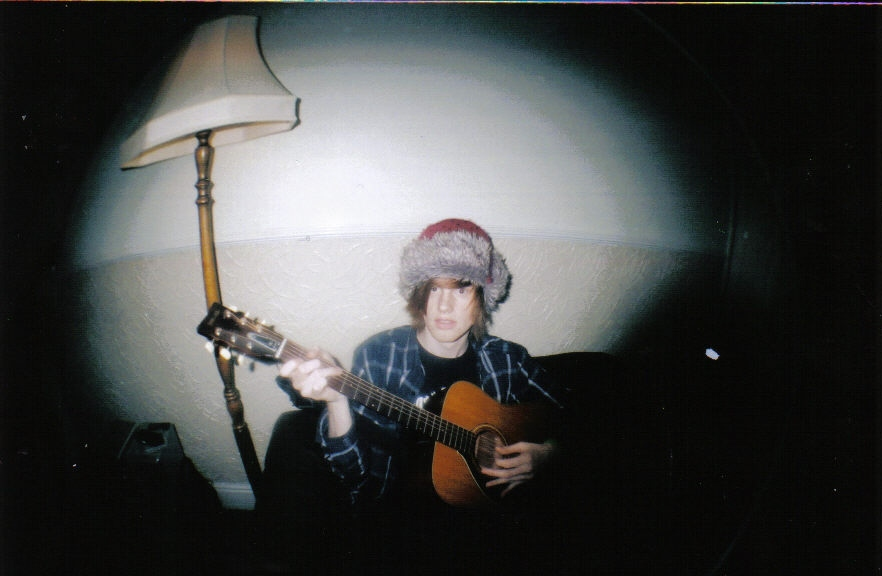

Background information
- Origin: Teesside
- Genres: Folk
- Years active: 2009–present
- Members: Rick Dobbing
- Website: www.dressedlikewolves.bandcamp.com

Dressed Like Wolves is the recording project of Teesside based songwriter Rick Dobbing. He began to track songs together with friends at home in early 2009. His first full-length 'I Could Walk on Water, But I'd Rather Part the Sea'. was self-released in May 2010. It was met with praise from internet blogs and radio stations, appearing on several podcasts and personal Top 100 lists of the year. In the following months, the group made several appearances on both online/CD based music compilations and local radio. Subsequently, a second full-length was released in 2011. The group were also featured in online showcase BalconyTV in 2011. Recently, the band have been billed alongside Jeffrey Lewis and The Junkyard, Forest Fire and Euros Childs.

The group are currently completing their fourth LP and playing dates in the North East of England.

== Discography ==
- These Songs Can't Swim (Demos) (2009)
- I Could Walk On Water, But I'd Rather Part The Sea (2010)
- Divine House EP (2010)
- Sometimes You've Got to Stop Caving and Melt (2011)
- By Toutatis/Dressed Like Wolves - split CD-R (2012)
- Heaven Is Just Memories, of a Place I Used To Know (2012)
- In The End We All Just Walk Off Into The Sea In The Eyes Of The Ones We Left Behind (Nov 2014)
- The Big Try (2017)
