= Wolf Alice =

British alternative rock band

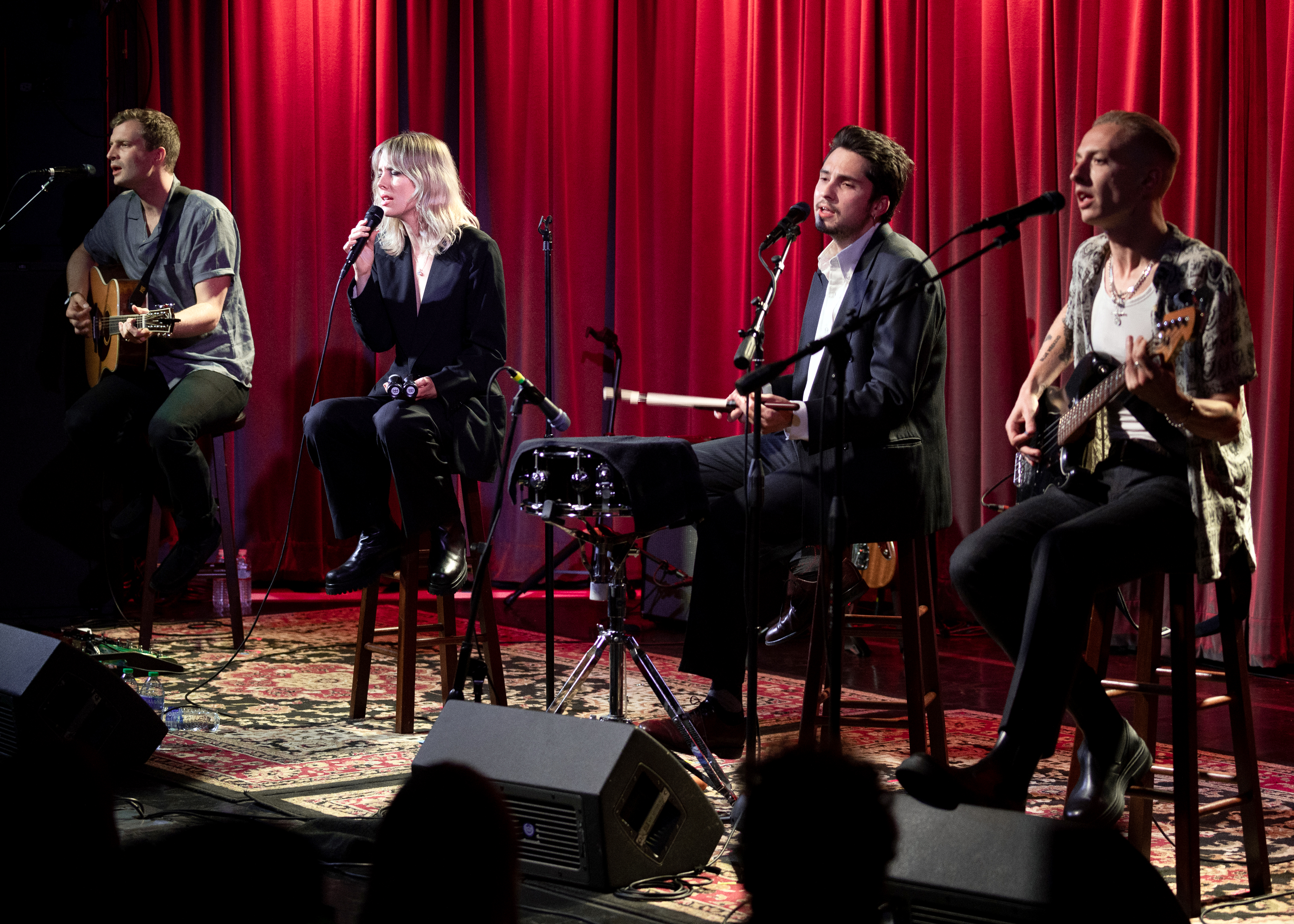
- Wolf Alice in 2021. From left: Joff Oddie, Ellie Rowsell, Joel Amey, Theo Ellis

Background information
- Origin: London, England
- Genres: Alternative rock; indie rock; dream pop; shoegaze; folk
- Works: Wolf Alice discography
- Years active: 2010–present
- Labels: Chess Club; Dirty Hit; RCA; Columbia
- Members: Ellie Rowsell; Joff Oddie; Joel Amey; Theo Ellis
- Past members: Sadie Cleary; James DC
- Website: wolfalice.co.uk

Wolf Alice are an English rock band from London. Formed in 2010 as an acoustic duo made up of singer Ellie Rowsell and guitarist Joff Oddie, Wolf Alice have also featured drummer Joel Amey and bassist Theo Ellis since 2012.

Wolf Alice played their first gig at Highbury Garage in December 2010 supporting April in the Shade, after Rowsell and Oddie met the band at an open mic at the Hope and Anchor in Islington. They released their debut single "Fluffy" in February 2013 and followed it with "Bros" in May. They released their debut EP Blush in October, and its follow-up Creature Songs in May 2014. In February 2015, the band released the lead single "Giant Peach" from their debut album My Love Is Cool, which was released in June 2015. It includes their 2014 single "Moaning Lisa Smile", which peaked at No. 9 on US Billboard's Alternative Songs chart in August 2015, and was nominated for the 2016 Grammy Award for Best Rock Performance.

The band released their second studio album Visions of a Life in September 2017. It debuted at No.2 on the UK Albums Chart, and received widespread acclaim from music critics. Ranked as one of the year's best albums by multiple publications, the album won the 2018 Mercury Prize. The band's third studio album Blue Weekend was released in June 2021 to universal acclaim, and became the band's first UK No.1 album. Wolf Alice won the 2022 Brit Award for British Group. Their fourth album, The Clearing, was released in August 2025 and also hit No. 1 in the UK, earning a nomination for the 2026 Brit Award for British Album.

== History ==
=== 2010–2016: Formation, EPs and My Love Is Cool ===
Wolf Alice were formed in 2010 and began as an acoustic duo between Ellie Rowsell and Joff Oddie. Their name came from a short story by Angela Carter. Eventually deciding to add electric elements to their sound, they recruited Rowsell's childhood friend Sadie Cleary to play bass and Oddie's friend James DC to be their drummer. They self-released an EP called Wolf Alice that year, featuring three songs: "Every Cloud", "Wednesday", and "Destroy Me".

When James DC broke his wrist in 2012, Joel Amey joined the band as a temporary replacement drummer, but later became a permanent member. In that same year, Cleary left to focus on her studies. Theo Ellis was then recruited as their bassist in late 2012. They released the song "Leaving You" online on SoundCloud as a free download which gained airplay from BBC Radio 1 and featured in NME's 'Radar' section. After the song was released, they toured with Peace, and recorded a session for Huw Stephens' Radio 1 show in January. They released their first physical single "Fluffy" in February 2013 on the Chess Club label.

Wolf Alice released their second single "Bros" in May on Chess Club Records. "Bros" is one of the first songs that Rowsell wrote, which the band played in their early stages, leading to a tour where the band were supported by bands such as Dressed Like Wolves and Dead New Blood. In October 2013, Wolf Alice released their first official EP called Blush, which was preceded by the release of "She".

In December 2013, they were chosen as the single most blogged about artist in the UK in that year by BBC Radio 6 Music. In 2014, they signed to Dirty Hit and released their second EP Creature Songs in May. In December 2014, the band were named "Best Breakthrough Artist" at the UK Festival Awards.

In late February 2015, Wolf Alice announced their debut album My Love Is Cool, and released the first single from the album, "Giant Peach". In April, they released a reworked version of the fan favourite "Bros" as the second single from their debut album. On 10 June, the band shared a new track, "You're a Germ". My Love Is Cool was released on 22 June, debuting at No. 2 on the UK Albums Chart and receiving highly positive reviews. Later that year, they released "You're a Germ" and "Freazy" as singles, as well as "Lisbon" in 2016. Later in 2016, they toured as a support act for the 1975's tour in the US.

Filmmaker Michael Winterbottom followed Wolf Alice as they toured for My Love Is Cool, with support from Swim Deep and Bloody Knees. He filmed the band and also inserted two actors among them, playing members of the road crew, with a fictional love story developing as they moved from gig to gig. The resulting docudrama film, On the Road, was released in October 2016. According to Deadspin, "In the documentary, Winterbottom captures 16 different gigs and daily life backstage from the point of view of a new member of their crew."

=== 2017–2020: Visions of a Life, Mercury Prize win ===
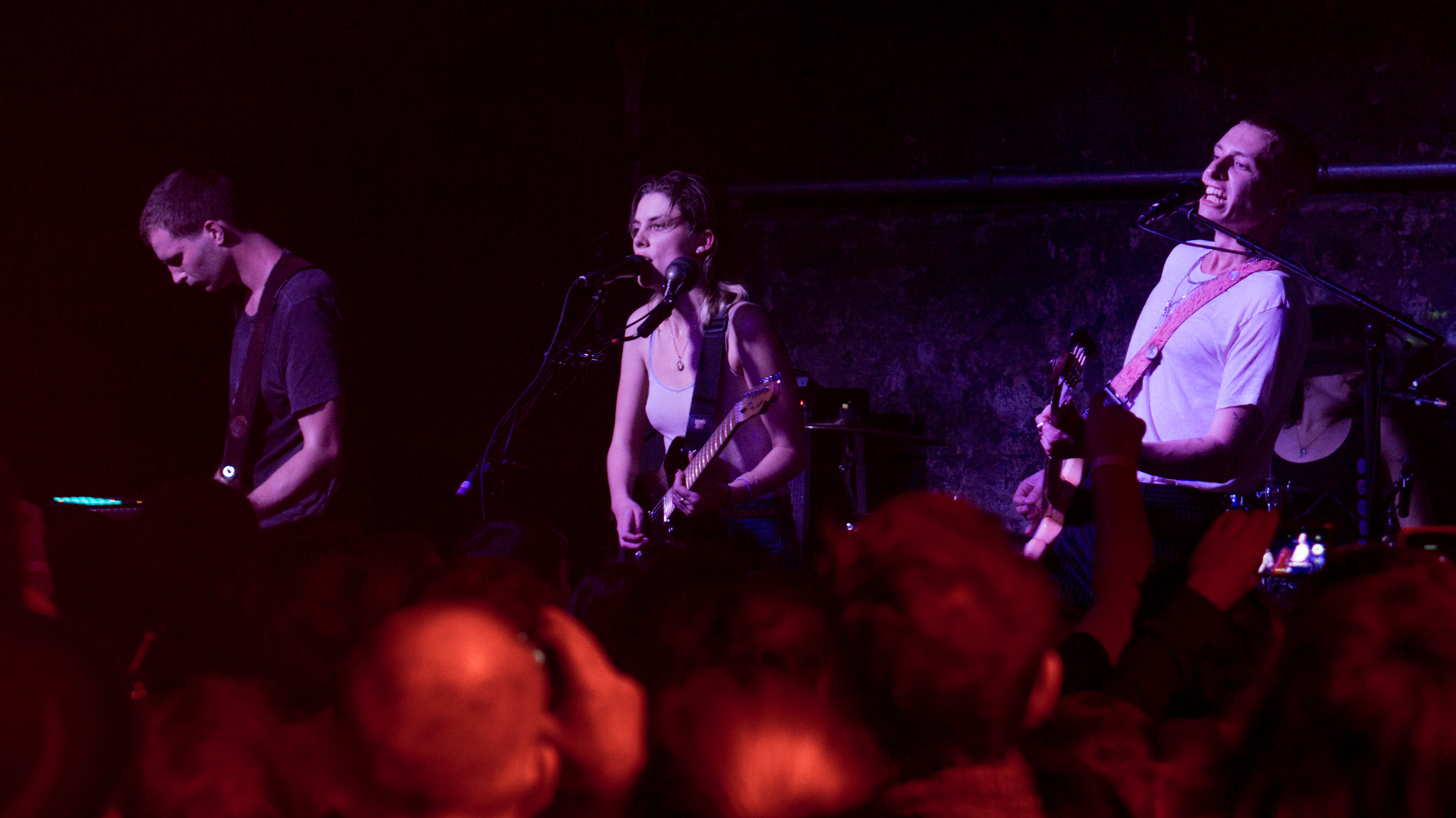
Wolf Alice in 2017

In June 2017, Wolf Alice released the lead single "Yuk Foo" off their second studio album, Visions of a Life. They released three more singles, "Don't Delete the Kisses", "Beautifully Unconventional", and "Heavenward", before the release of their album on 28 September. In 2018, they also released "Formidable Cool", "Sadboy" and "Space & Time" as singles from the album.

The band toured throughout 2018, including dates supporting Foo Fighters during their Concrete and Gold Tour and Queens of the Stone Age as part of their Villains World Tour. They also supported Liam Gallagher at his concert at Finsbury Park on 29 June 2018.

In September 2018, Visions of a Life won the 2018 Mercury Prize.

=== 2021–2023: Blue Weekend ===
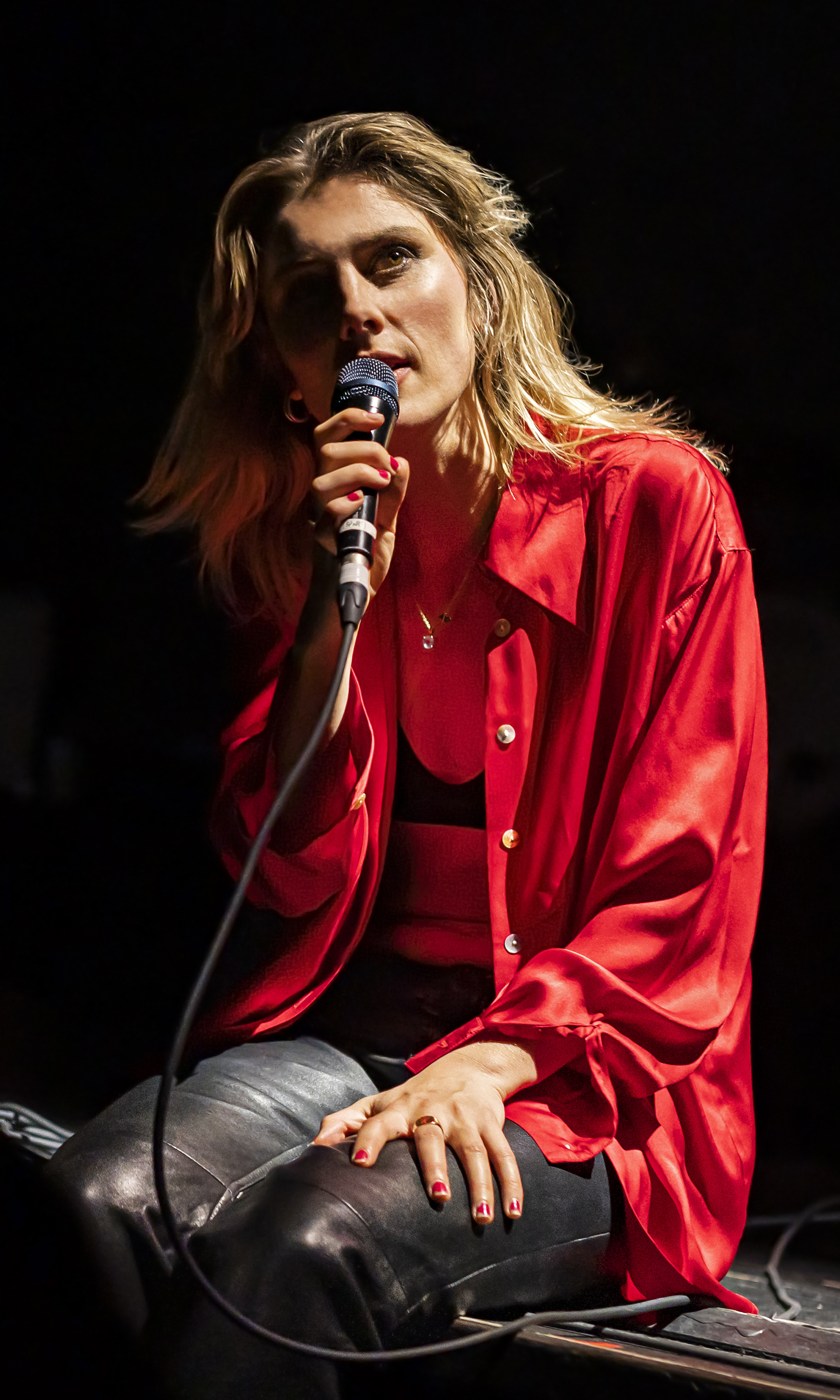
Frontwoman Ellie Rowsell performing at the Wiltern in 2022

On 15 February 2021, the band's website was updated to show a looping video of an eye, with the heading "The Last Man on Earth". On 22 February 2021, the band announced that their single "The Last Man on Earth" would be released on 24 February 2021, and would debut on Annie Mac's show on BBC Radio 1. The release of the single was backed by the announcement of their third studio album, Blue Weekend, which was released on 4 June 2021. The second single from the album, "Smile", was released on 20 April 2021. Blue Weekend received widespread critical acclaim, and was nominated for the 2021 Mercury Prize. On 29 October 2021, the band released Blue Weekend: Tour Deluxe which includes four live versions of tracks from the album ("Smile", "How Can I Make it OK", "Safe From Heartbreak", and "The Last Man on Earth") as well as a live cover of "Bobby" by Alex G.

Wolf Alice won the 2022 Brit Award for Group of the Year.

On 5 May 2022, the band released a lullaby version of "The Last Man on Earth" as a single and announced Blue Lullaby, an EP featuring reworked lullaby versions of five tracks from Blue Weekend, which was subsequently released on 24 June 2022. During the summer of 2022, the band played 17 shows supporting Harry Styles' Love On Tour, the first date in Hamburg on 26 June and the last show in Lisbon on 31 July.

=== 2024–present: The Clearing ===
In February 2024, it was announced that Wolf Alice had left Dirty Hit to sign with Columbia Records. In April 2025, Wolf Alice began to tease the release of new material on their social media accounts. On 15 May, the band released the single "Bloom Baby Bloom" and subsequently announced their fourth studio album The Clearing, originally to be released on 29 August 2025, but later moved to 22 August 2025.

In March 2026, Wolf Alice were in the lineup for a one-off concert, Trans Mission, in aid of trans-solidarity charities Good Law Project and Not a Phase, alongside Sugababes, Beth Ditto and Sophie Ellis-Bextor. On 28 March 2026, Wolf Alice performed "White Horses" and "Leaning Against The Wall" on Saturday Night Live UK as the musical guest. Jamie Dornan hosted.

On 2 July 2026, the band released a new track "Gospel Oak" as the first of three songs from the extended version of the album, titled The Clearing: B Sides. It was released digitally on 19 August 2026, with the physical vinyl edition being released on 21 August 2026.

In September 2026, Wolf Alice joined Olivia Rodrigo on the Unraveled Tour as the opening band.

== Musical style and influences ==
While the group's early material was folk-tinged pop, they became more rock-oriented after the rhythm section joined. Generally, the band's musical style has been described as alternative rock, indie rock, dream pop, shoegaze, grunge, folk, pop, and electronic. Clash described the band as "the lovechild of folk and grunge". The "Fluffy" single saw the band compared to Elastica and Hole, while the single's B-side, "White Leather", saw comparisons to the xx. Kitty Empire, writing in The Observer, described their sound as "an engaging strain of off-kilter indie rock". The band describe their music as "rocky pop". The Telegraph declared Wolf Alice's debut album as 'feral and sophisticated' in review.

In interviews, the band have cited their liking for Kings of Leon, Nick Cave, Radiohead, Tame Impala, the Vines, the Beatles, the Band, Siouxsie and the Banshees, Blur, and Courtney Love.

Rowsell's voice type is classified as soprano.

== Band members ==
Joff Oddie performing in 2025

Theo Ellis performing in 2025

Current members

- Ellie Rowsell – lead vocals, rhythm guitar, keyboards, synthesizers, piano (2010–present)
- Joff Oddie – lead guitar, violin, keyboards, synthesizers, backing vocals (2010–present)
- Joel Amey – drums, percussion, keyboards, synthesizers, backing vocals, occasional lead vocals and guitar (2012–present)
- Theo Ellis – bass, keyboards, synthesizers, backing vocals (2012–present)

Current touring musicians

- Ryan Malcolm – keyboards, synthesizers, piano, percussion, backing vocals (2021–present)
- Julia Cumming – bass, backing vocals (2026, substitute for Theo Ellis)

Former members

- Sadie Cleary – bass (2010–2012)
- James DC – drums (2010–2012)

== Discography ==
Studio albums

- My Love Is Cool (2015)
- Visions of a Life (2017)
- Blue Weekend (2021)
- The Clearing (2025)

== Awards and nominations ==
Award	Year	Category	Nominated work	Result	Ref.
AIM Independent Music Awards	2016	Best Live Act	Wolf Alice	Nominated	
AIM Independent Music Awards	2016	PPL Award for Most-Played Independent New Act	Wolf Alice	Nominated	
AIM Independent Music Awards	2018	Best Independent Track	"Don't Delete the Kisses"	Nominated	
Brit Awards	2016	British Breakthrough Act	Wolf Alice	Nominated	
Brit Awards	2018	British Group	Wolf Alice	Nominated	
Brit Awards	2022	British Group	Wolf Alice	Won	
Brit Awards	2022	Best British Alternative/Rock Act	Wolf Alice	Nominated	
Brit Awards	2026	Best British Alternative/Rock Act	Wolf Alice	Nominated	
Brit Awards	2026	British Album of the Year	Wolf Alice	Nominated	
Brit Awards	2026	British Group	Wolf Alice	Won	
Global Awards	2018	Best Indie	Wolf Alice	Nominated	
Grammy Awards	2016	Best Rock Performance	"Moaning Lisa Smile"	Nominated	
iTunes Store	2015	Best New Artist/Band	Wolf Alice	Won	
Ivor Novello	2016	Best Song Musically and Lyrically	"Bros"	Nominated	
Ivor Novello	2026	Best Album	"The Clearing"	Nominated	
Mercury Prize	2015	Best Album	My Love Is Cool	Nominated	
Mercury Prize	2018	Best Album	Visions of a Life	Won	
Mercury Prize	2021	Best Album	Blue Weekend	Nominated	
Mercury Prize	2025	Best Album	The Clearing	Nominated	
NME Awards	2016	Best British Band	Wolf Alice	Nominated	
NME Awards	2016	Best Live Band	Wolf Alice	Won	
NME Awards	2016	Best Fan Community	Wolf Alice	Nominated	
NME Awards	2016	Best Album	My Love Is Cool	Nominated	
NME Awards	2016	Best Track	"Giant Peach"	Won	
NME Awards	2016	Best Music Video	"You're a Germ"	Nominated	
NME Awards	2017	Best British Band	Wolf Alice	Nominated	
NME Awards	2017	Best Live Band	Wolf Alice	Nominated	
NME Awards	2017	Best Music Video	Wolf Alice	Nominated	
NME Awards	2018	Best British Band	Wolf Alice	Nominated	
NME Awards	2018	Best Album	Visions of a Life	Nominated	
NME Awards	2022	Best Band in the World	Wolf Alice	Nominated	
NME Awards	2022	Best Band from the UK	Wolf Alice	Nominated	
NME Awards	2022	Best Festival Headliner	Wolf Alice	Won	
NME Awards	2022	Best Album in the World	Blue Weekend	Nominated	
NME Awards	2022	Best Album by a UK Artist	Blue Weekend	Nominated	
UK Festival Awards	2014	Best Breakthrough Artist	Wolf Alice	Won	
UK Music Video Awards	2015	Best Live Music Coverage	Wolf Alice Vevo Lift UK	Nominated	
UK Music Video Awards	2018	Best Rock Video – Newcomer	"Space and Time"	Nominated	
UK Music Video Awards	2019	Best Live Video	"Visions of a Life"	Nominated	
UK Music Video Awards	2021	Best Live Video	"Lipstick on the Glass" at Union Chapel	Nominated	
UK Music Video Awards	2021	Best Rock Video – UK	"How Can I Make It Ok"	Nominated	
UK Music Video Awards	2021	Best Special Video Project	Blue Weekend	Nominated	
UK Music Video Awards	2025	Best Rock Video – UK	"The Sofa"	Nominated	
UK Music Video Awards	2025	Best Rock Video – UK	"Bloom Baby Bloom"	Won	
UK Music Video Awards	2025	Best Styling in a Video	"Bloom Baby Bloom"	Nominated	
UK Music Video Awards	2025	Best Choreography in a Video	"Bloom Baby Bloom"	Nominated	
