= Giant Peach =

Song by alternative rock band Wolf Alice

Single by Wolf Alice

from the album My Love Is Cool
- B-side: "I Saw You (In a Corridor)"
- Released: 24 February 2015
- Studio: Livingston Recording Studios, London
- Genre: Post-punk; garage rock
- Length: 4:35
- Label: Dirty Hit; RCA Records
- Songwriters: Ellen Rowsell; Jonathan Oddie; Joel Amey; Theodore Ellis
- Producer: Mike Crossey

Wolf Alice singles chronology
"Moaning Lisa Smile" (2014)	"Giant Peach" (2015)	"Bros" (2015)

Music video
- "Giant Peach" on YouTube

"Giant Peach" is a song by British alternative rock band Wolf Alice. The song was released on 24 February 2015 as the lead single from their debut album My Love Is Cool via Dirty Hit.

== Background ==
The song was released on 24 February alongside the announcement of the band's debut album My Love Is Cool.

Vocalist Ellie Rowsell stated that the song was about growing up in London and is about "a love affair with the city." The title of the song is a reference to Roald Dahl's book James and the Giant Peach. Rowsell described the song as "a song to dance to, but also a song to lose your shit to."

The song was premiered by Zane Lowe as the Hottest Record in the World on his BBC Radio 1 show. The song won the Best Track Award at the 2016 NME Awards.

The song's mockumentary-style music video features a performance by actor Tony Gardner, as a manager, and a cameo appearance by actor Ewen MacIntosh.

== In popular culture ==
The song was included on Guitar Hero Live's GHTV mode alongside "Love Me" by The 1975, "Delete" by DMA's, "Man in the Box" by Alice in Chains, "Low" by Cracker and "Sleep Now in the Fire" by Rage Against the Machine on their list of additions on April 13, 2016.

The song was included on season 2, episode 1 of The Royals. It was also on the soundtrack for the 2016 movie Detour.

Scottish craft brewery Overtone Brewing Co brewed a peach sour named after the song.

== Track listing ==
- UK 7" release (2015)
1. "Giant Peach"
2. "I Saw You (In a Corridor)"
- UK CD single (2015)
1. "Giant Peach" (radio edit)
2. "Giant Peach"
3. "Bros" (instrumental)

== Personnel ==
Credits adapted from the liner notes of the 7" vinyl release

- Wolf Alice – written by
- Mike Crossey - producing, mixing
- Robin Schmidt - mastering
