= My Love Is Cool =

2015 studio album by Wolf Alice

Studio album by Wolf Alice
- Released: 22 June 2015
- Recorded: 2014–2015
- Studio: Livingston, London
- Genre: Alternative rock; dream pop; shoegaze
- Length: 48:52
- Label: Dirty Hit; RCA
- Producer: Mike Crossey

Wolf Alice chronology
Creature Songs (2014)	My Love Is Cool (2015)	Visions of a Life (2017)

Singles from My Love Is Cool
- 1. "Giant Peach" Released: 24 February 2015; 2. "Bros" Released: 17 April 2015; 3. "You're a Germ" Released: 10 June 2015; 4. "Freazy" Released: 27 November 2015; 5. "Lisbon" Released: 22 June 2016

My Love Is Cool is the debut studio album by English alternative rock band Wolf Alice. It was released on 22 June 2015 in the United Kingdom by Dirty Hit and a day later in the United States by RCA Records. The album includes the previously released singles "Bros" and "Fluffy" in re-recorded versions, and was preceded by the songs "Giant Peach" and "You're a Germ". The song "Moaning Lisa Smile", which originally appeared on the band's 2014 EP Creature Songs, peaked at number nine on the US Billboard Alternative Songs chart, and was also included on the US edition of the album. While not a single, the song "Silk" appeared on the soundtrack of T2 Trainspotting, peaking at number 39 on the Scottish charts in 2017.

My Love Is Cool received positive reviews from critics and debuted at number two on the UK Albums Chart. The album was nominated for the 2015 Mercury Music Prize. On 19 August 2016, My Love Is Cool was reissued as a limited-edition box set, containing a 12-inch double gatefold vinyl of the album, 10-inch vinyl copies of the Blush and Creature Songs EPs, and a bonus CD of demos, B-sides and rarities.

== Critical reception ==
Professional ratings
Aggregate scores
Source	Rating
AnyDecentMusic?	7.9/10
Metacritic	78/100
Review scores
Source	Rating
AllMusic	3.5/5 stars
The Daily Telegraph	4/5 stars
The Guardian	4/5 stars
The Irish Times	4/5 stars
Mojo	3/5 stars
NME	9/10
Pitchfork	7.4/10
Q	4/5 stars
Rolling Stone	3.5/5 stars
Uncut	8/10

My Love Is Cool received positive reviews from critics. At Metacritic, which assigns a normalized rating out of 100 to reviews from mainstream critics, the album received an average score of 78, based on 21 reviews, indicating generally favorable reviews. Harriet Gibsone of The Guardian called the album "familiar but invigorating indie-rock", further stating: "while the foundations of My Love Is Cool are 90s/00s shoegaze and grunge, the London quartet defibrillate their influences with the ambition of youth. It also feels like an album that's been allowed time to gestate: despite being virtually veteran in buzzband terms, they have benefited from beefing up their sound on tour – as evidenced on the heavy romance of 'Your Loves Whore', the dirty degenerate chug of 'You're a Germ', or the cinematic 'Turn to Dust'. The awkward introversion in the lyrics – which deal with relationship strife, creepy blokes, friendship, gender and the quest for eternal love – add a sense of emotional overload driven by late nights, blood pacts and wide-eyed wonder. It's an invigorating debut with a gaunt, gallant identity of its own." Harriet Gibsone, also of The Guardian, described the album musically as "grungy, dream-pop."

Stephen Ackroyd of DIY praised the album, saying "My Love Is Cool isn't simply a great debut. It's not just a great album full stop. It's, in no uncertain terms, a remarkable one. The furthest from route one they could ever get, Wolf Alice aren't just sure of who they are; they own it." MusicOMH's Graeme Marsh said the album is "as good a debut as you could hope to hear, a fresh injection of pure brilliance and beauty to a genre that is creaking under the weight of mediocrity and a lack of adventurous inventiveness." AllMusic critic Heather Phares stated that "even if My Love Is Cool sacrifices some of Wolf Alice's earlier fury, the album is all the stronger for it." Neil McCormick of The Telegraph wrote, "They don't quite sound like the finished article, but there is a virtuous sense of their trying to make music in service of something profound." Pitchfork's Laura Snapes stated: "The confident diversity of My Love Is Cool indicates a band who have their own thing all figured out, who shouldn't veer from their own strange path to live up to outdated narratives that dictate what a young British band should be."

=== Accolades ===
Publication	Accolade	Rank	Ref.
Drowned in Sound	Favorite Albums of 2015	4	
The Guardian	The Best Albums of 2015	13	
musicOMH	Top 50 Albums of 2015	6	
NME	Albums of the Year 2015	4	
Q	50 Albums of the Year 2015	44	
Rough Trade	Albums of the Year 2015	6	
Time Out London	The 50 Best Albums of 2015	6	
Under the Radar	Top 100 Albums of 2015	3	
NME	Best Albums of the Decade	65	

== Track listing ==
All tracks are written by Ellie Rowsell, Joff Oddie, Theo Ellis and Joel Amey.

No.	Title	Length
1.	"Turn to Dust"	3:07
2.	"Bros"	3:44
3.	"Your Loves Whore"	4:57
4.	"You're a Germ"	2:53
5.	"Lisbon"	3:26
6.	"Silk"	4:03
7.	"Freazy"	3:14
8.	"Giant Peach"	4:35
9.	"Swallowtail"	5:41
10.	"Soapy Water"	3:42
11.	"Fluffy"	2:44
12.	"The Wonderwhy" (includes hidden track "My Love Is Cool")	6:46
Total length:		48:52

Digital deluxe edition bonus tracks
No.	Title	Length
13.	"Moaning Lisa Smile"	2:40
14.	"Storms"	3:24
15.	"Heavenly Creatures"	3:17
16.	"We're Not the Same"	3:04
17.	"Blush"	4:19
18.	"She"	3:12
19.	"Nosedive"	2:46
20.	"90 Mile Beach"	3:44
21.	"Baby Ain't Made of China"	3:37
22.	"I Saw You (In a Corridor)"	2:42
23.	"Every Cloud"	2:54
24.	"White Leather"	2:36
25.	"Leaving You"	3:18
26.	"Freazy" (music video)	3:17
27.	"You're a Germ" (music video)	2:51
28.	"Bros" (music video)	3:45
29.	"Giant Peach" (music video)	4:34
30.	"Moaning Lisa Smile" (music video)	2:48
31.	"Fluffy" (music video)	3:16
Total length:		119:56

US edition
No.	Title	Length
1.	"Turn to Dust"	3:07
2.	"Bros"	3:44
3.	"Your Loves Whore"	4:57
4.	"Moaning Lisa Smile"	2:42
5.	"You're a Germ"	2:53
6.	"Lisbon"	3:26
7.	"Silk"	4:03
8.	"Freazy"	3:14
9.	"Giant Peach"	4:35
10.	"Swallowtail"	5:41
11.	"Soapy Water"	3:42
12.	"Fluffy"	2:44
13.	"The Wonderwhy" (includes hidden track "My Love Is Cool")	6:46
Total length:		51:34

Limited-edition box set – bonus 10-inch vinyl (Creature Songs)
No.	Title	Length
1.	"Moaning Lisa Smile"	2:40
2.	"Storms"	3:24
3.	"Heavenly Creatures"	3:17
4.	"We're Not the Same"	3:04
Total length:		12:25

Limited-edition box set – bonus 10-inch vinyl (Blush)
No.	Title	Length
1.	"Blush"	4:19
2.	"She"	3:12
3.	"Nosedive"	2:47
4.	"Ninety Mile Beach"	3:44
Total length:		14:02

Limited-edition box set – bonus CD (B-Sides, Demos & Shit)
No.	Title	Length
1.	"The Movie of Your Life" (demo)
2.	"Destroy Me" (demo)
3.	"Wednesday" (demo)
4.	"Bros" (demo)
5.	"Every Cloud"	2:54
6.	"White Leather"	2:36
7.	"Leaving You"	3:18
8.	"I Saw You (In a Corridor)"	2:42
9.	"Baby Ain't Made of China"	3:37
10.	"Swallowtail" (demo)

== Personnel ==
Credits adapted from the liner notes of My Love Is Cool.

=== Wolf Alice ===
- Ellie Rowsell – guitars, vocals, synths, programming, piano, Omnichord, Hammond organ
- Joff Oddie – guitars, backing vocals, synths, programming, banjo, violins
- Theo Ellis – bass guitar, backing vocals, synths
- Joel Amey – drums, percussion, backing vocals, lead vocals on "Swallowtail", synths, programming, guitars, Hammond organ

=== Additional personnel ===
- Mike Crossey – production, mixing, synths, programming
- Jonathan Gilmore – engineering
- Robin Schmidt – mastering
- Rachel Thomas – cover photo
- Samuel Burgess-Johnson – design

== Charts ==
Chart (2015)	Peak position
Australian Albums (ARIA)	41
Belgian Albums (Ultratop Flanders)	148
Dutch Albums (Album Top 100)	83
Irish Albums (IRMA)	37
Irish Independent Albums (IRMA)	2
Scottish Albums (OCC)	6
UK Albums (OCC)	2
UK Independent Albums (OCC)	1
US Billboard 200	90
US Top Alternative Albums (Billboard)	12
US Top Rock Albums (Billboard)	14

== Certifications ==
Region	Certification	Certified units/sales
United Kingdom (BPI)	Gold	109,020
