= You're a Germ =

Single by Wolf Alice

from the album My Love Is Cool
- B-side: "Baby Ain't Made of China"
- Released: 10 June 2015
- Studio: Livingston (London)
- Genre: Alternative rock; post-grunge
- Length: 2:40
- Label: Dirty Hit
- Songwriters: Ellen Rowsell; Jonathan Oddie; Joel Amey; Theodore Ellis
- Producer: Mike Crossey

Wolf Alice singles chronology
"Bros" (2015)	"You're a Germ" (2015)	"Freazy" (2015)

Music video
- "You're a Germ" on YouTube

"You're a Germ" is a song by English alternative rock band Wolf Alice. It was released on 10 June 2015 as the third single from their debut studio album, My Love Is Cool.

== Background and release ==
Wolf Alice announced "You're a Germ" as My Love Is Cool's third single on 10 June 2015. In an interview with Consequence of Sound, bassist Theo Ellis described the song as "the spark to some of our first mosh pits and holds a solid place in our hearts as one of our older songs."

== In popular culture ==
"You're a Germ" is featured in an episode of The Royals.

== Track listing ==
- UK 7" single
1. You're a Germ
2. Baby Ain't Made of China

== Personnel ==
Credits adapted from the liner notes of "You're a Germ".

- Mike Crossey – production, mixing
- Jonathan Gilmore – engineering
- Robin Schmidt – mastering
