= Bros (Wolf Alice song) =

Song by English alternative rock band Wolf Alice

Single by Wolf Alice

from the album My Love Is Cool
- B-side: "Every Cloud"
- Released: 20 May 2013 (demo version); 17 April 2015 (final version)
- Studio: Dean St. Studios
- Genre: Indie rock
- Length: 3:44
- Label: Chess Club; Dirty Hit
- Songwriters: Ellen Rowsell; Jonathan Oddie; Joel Amey; Theodore Ellis
- Producers: Wolf Alice; Austen Jux-Chandler

Wolf Alice singles chronology
| "Giant Peach" (2015) | "Bros" (2013) | "You're a Germ" (2015) |

Music video
- "Bros" on YouTube

"Bros" is a song by English alternative rock band Wolf Alice. The song was originally released as a demo on 20 May 2013 through Chess Club Records, but was eventually reworked for their debut album My Love Is Cool, and was released as the second single from the album on 17 April 2015 through Dirty Hit.

== Background and release ==
Wolf Alice released a demo version of "Bros" in early 2013. The song was eventually reworked to be featured on their debut album, and was announced as the second single from My Love Is Cool on 16 April 2015, and was released the following day. In an interview with NME, lead singer Ellie Rowsell described the song as "a sentimental tune to us, it's grown and changed with us over the past couple of years, taking on different shapes and forms until it evolved into being this definitive album version. It's an ode to childhood imagination and friendship and all the charm that comes with that."

== Chart performance ==
"Bros" peaked at No. 157 on the UK Top 200 and was the only song by Wolf Alice to enter the main UK Singles chart until "Don't Delete the Kisses" in September 2018.

== In popular culture ==
The song is featured in the conclusion to the "Hell is Empty" episode of the 2017 video game Life Is Strange: Before the Storm.

== Track listing ==
- UK 7" release (2013)
1. "Bros"
2. "Every Cloud"
- UK CD single (2015)
1. "Bros"
2. "Bros (Instrumental)"

== Personnel ==
Credits adapted from the liner notes of the 2013 release of "Bros".

- Wolf Alice – production, mixing
- Austen Jux-Chandler – production, engineering
- Tom Upex – production assistant, engineering assistant
- Dan Grech-Marguerat – mixing, additional programming

== Charts ==
Chart performance for "Bros"
| Chart (2015) | Peak position |
|---|---|
| Belgium (Ultratop 50 Flanders) | 58 |
| Scottish Singles Sales (Official Charts) | 90 |
| UK Singles (Official Charts Company) | 157 |
| US Adult Alternative Airplay (Billboard) | 12 |
| US Alternative Airplay (Billboard) | 35 |
| US Rock & Alternative Airplay (Billboard) | 45 |

== Certifications ==
Certifications for "Bros"
| Region | Certification | Certified units/sales |
|---|---|---|
| United Kingdom (BPI) | Silver | 200,000^{‡} |
^{‡} Sales+streaming figures based on certification alone.
