= Blue Weekend =

Studio album by Wolf Alice
- Released: 4 June 2021
- Studios: ICP (Brussels); Iguana (London)
- Genres: Alternative rock; dream pop; indie pop; shoegaze
- Length: 40:08
- Label: Dirty Hit
- Producer: Markus Dravs

Wolf Alice chronology
Visions of a Life (2017)	Blue Weekend (2021)	The Clearing (2025)

Singles from Blue Weekend
- 1. "The Last Man on Earth" Released: 24 February 2021; 2. "Smile" Released: 20 April 2021; 3. "No Hard Feelings" Released: 11 May 2021; 4. "How Can I Make It OK?" Released: 3 June 2021

Blue Weekend is the third studio album by English rock band Wolf Alice, released on 4 June 2021 through Dirty Hit. Their first studio album in four years, Blue Weekend was preceded by four singles—"The Last Man on Earth", "Smile", "No Hard Feelings" and "How Can I Make It OK?". The album received acclaim from music critics, with many naming it the band's best work, and was shortlisted for the Mercury Prize in 2021. It was their final album with Dirty Hit before signing with Columbia Records.

== Release ==
On 24 February 2021, Wolf Alice announced the album's title and initial release date of 11 June, alongside the release of lead single "The Last Man on Earth". On 3 May 2021, the band announced that they would be bringing the album's release earlier by one week, to 4 June.

== Promotion ==
=== Singles ===
Blue Weekend was preceded by four singles. "The Last Man on Earth" was released on 24 February 2021 as the album's lead single. It was premiered by Annie Mac on her eponymous BBC Radio 1 Radio program, where Ellie Rowsell and Theo Ellis from the band co-hosted with her. The music video was released on YouTube an hour after Mac's radio show started.

"Smile" was released on 20 April 2021 as the album's second single. It was premiered the same way as its predecessor.

"No Hard Feelings" was released on 11 May 2021, an hour earlier than the previous two on Zane Lowe's Apple Music show, with the music video again released on YouTube an hour afterwards. "How Can I Make It OK?" was released on 3 June 2021 as the fourth and last single of the album along with a music video on YouTube.

On 10 June 2021, Wolf Alice premiered a short film directed by Jordan Hemingway at an acoustic performance at Soho Picturehouse. Including previously released music videos and new material shot for the film, the film showcases album tracks performed while set during a night at a London bar. The film was later released via Wolf Alice's YouTube channel on 14 July 2022 as Blue Weekend (Film).

On 5 May 2022, the band released a lullaby version of "The Last Man on Earth" as a single and announced Blue Lullaby, an EP featuring reworked lullaby versions of five tracks from the album. This was subsequently released on 24 June 2022.

== Critical reception ==
Professional ratings
Aggregate scores
Source	Rating
AnyDecentMusic?	8.3/10
Metacritic	91/100
Review scores
Source	Rating
AllMusic	4/5 stars
Classic Rock	9/10
The Daily Telegraph	5/5 stars
DIY	5/5 stars
The Guardian	5/5 stars
The Independent	5/5 stars
Mojo	4/5 stars
NME	5/5 stars
Pitchfork	7.2/10
The Scotsman	4/5 stars

Blue Weekend received acclaim from music critics, many of whom described it as their best album. On Metacritic, which assigns a normalized rating of 100, the album received an average score of 91, based on 19 reviews, indicating "universal acclaim". It was ranked as the third highest-rated album of 2021 on the website at the time of release.

Blue Weekend was nominated for the Mercury Prize in 2021, and multiple NME Awards in 2022.

=== Accolades ===
Blue Weekend on year-end lists
Publication	List	Rank	Ref.
Albumism	The 100 Best Albums of 2021	3	
The AU Review	The 40 Best Albums of 2021	3	
DIY	DIY’S Best Albums Of 2021	1	
Far Out Magazine	The 50 Best Albums of 2021	6	
Gaffa	Her er årets 20 bedste internationale album	4	
The Guardian	The 50 Best Albums of 2021	2	
NME	The 50 best albums of 2021	3	
Nothing but Hope and Passion	NBHAP's 50 Best Albums Of 2021	2	
OOR	Dit Zijn De 20 Beste Albums Van 2021	7	
The Skinny	The Skinny's Top Ten Albums of 2021	7	

== Commercial performance ==
Blue Weekend debuted at number one on the UK Albums Chart with 36,182 copies sold in its first week, becoming Wolf Alice's first number-one album. It was the biggest-selling album of 2021 in UK independent record shops.

== Track listing ==
All tracks are written by Ellie Rowsell, Joff Oddie, Theo Ellis and Joel Amey.

Blue Weekend track listing
No.	Title	Length
1.	"The Beach"	2:35
2.	"Delicious Things"	5:04
3.	"Lipstick on the Glass"	4:07
4.	"Smile"	3:16
5.	"Safe from Heartbreak (If You Never Fall in Love)"	2:32
6.	"How Can I Make It OK?"	4:47
7.	"Play the Greatest Hits"	2:27
8.	"Feeling Myself"	4:43
9.	"The Last Man on Earth"	4:21
10.	"No Hard Feelings"	2:35
11.	"The Beach II"	3:39
Total length:		40:08

Japanese edition bonus track
No.	Title	Length
12.	"Smile" (Demo)	3:10
Total length:		43:21

Record Store Day 2021 edition bonus track
No.	Title	Length
12.	"Time Is Not A Straight Line" (Demo)	2:35
Total length:		42:43

Tour Deluxe (The Pool Sessions)
No.	Title	Length
12.	"Smile" (The Pool Sessions)	3:14
13.	"How Can I Make It OK?" (The Pool Sessions)	4:56
14.	"Safe From Heartbreak (If You Never Fall In Love)" (The Pool Sessions)	2:32
15.	"Bobby" (The Pool Sessions)	3:32
16.	"The Last Man On Earth" (The Pool Sessions)	4:34
Total length:		59.01

== Personnel ==
Credits adapted from the liner notes of Blue Weekend.

=== Wolf Alice ===
- Ellie Rowsell – vocals, guitar, piano, bass, programming, Mellotron, synth, Wurlitzer, string arrangement
- Joff Oddie – guitar, piano, backing vocals, glock, programming, synth, claps, electric upright bass, bass, tenor resonator, 12-string, classical guitar, acoustic guitar
- Theo Ellis – bass, programming
- Joel Amey – drums, percussion, synth, backing vocals, guitar, Stylophone, programming, claps

=== Additional musicians ===
- Owen Pallett – string arrangement, violin, viola
- Iain Berryman – glasses, programming, keys, trumpet
- Joel Workman – electric upright bass
- Michael Peter Olsen – cello
- Markus Dravs – programming, synth

=== Technical ===
- Markus Dravs – production
- Iain Berryman – engineering, additional production
- Joel Workman – engineering assistance (all tracks); additional engineering (track 9)
- Charlie Andrew – vocal production (track 3); additional vocal production (tracks 1, 6, 9, 10); additional vocal recording (tracks 2, 4)
- Mark "Spike" Stent – mixing
- Matt Wolach – mixing assistance
- Ted Jensen – mastering

=== Artwork ===
- Jordan Hemingway – creative direction, photography
- Jamie Reid – art direction
- Aiden Miller – design

== Charts ==
=== Weekly charts ===
Weekly chart performance for Blue Weekend
Chart (2021)	Peak position
Australian Albums (ARIA)	9
Austrian Albums (Ö3 Austria)	39
Belgian Albums (Ultratop Flanders)	52
Dutch Albums (Album Top 100)	96
French Physical Albums (SNEP)	180
Irish Albums (Official Charts)	3
Portuguese Albums (AFP)	18
Scottish Albums (Official Charts)	1
Swiss Albums (Schweizer Hitparade)	25
UK Albums (Official Charts)	1
UK Independent Albums (Official Charts)	1
US Top Album Sales (Billboard)	34
US Top Current Album Sales (Billboard)	25
US Indie Store Album Sales (Billboard)	19

=== Year-end charts ===
Year-end chart performance for Blue Weekend
Chart (2021)	Position
UK Albums (OCC)	71

== Certifications ==
Region	Certification	Certified units/sales
United Kingdom (BPI)	Gold	100,000^{‡}
^{‡} Sales+streaming figures based on certification alone.

== Release history ==
Release history and formats for Blue Weekend
Region	Date	Format	Label	Catalogue	Ref.
Various	4 June 2021	Digital download; streaming	Dirty Hit	Not applicable	
Australia	4 June 2021	CD	Liberator; Dirty Hit	LIB226CD	
Australia	4 June 2021	LP	Liberator; Dirty Hit	DH1058	
Australia	4 June 2021	LP (JB Hi-Fi exclusive editions)	Liberator; Dirty Hit	DH1059; DH1060; DH1117	
New Zealand	4 June 2021	CD	Universal Music New Zealand	LIB226CD	
New Zealand	4 June 2021	LP	Universal Music New Zealand	DH1058	
New Zealand	4 June 2021	LP (JB Hi-Fi exclusive editions)	Liberator; Dirty Hit	DH1059; DH1060; DH1117	
