= Moaning Lisa Smile =

Single by Wolf Alice

from the EP Creature Songs
- B-side: "Giant Peach"
- Released: 3 April 2014
- Genre: Alternative rock; indie rock; grunge
- Length: 2:40
- Label: Dirty Hit
- Songwriters: Ellen Rowsell; Jonathan Oddie; Joel Amey; Theodore Ellis
- Producer: Catherine Marks

Wolf Alice singles chronology
"She" (2013)	"Moaning Lisa Smile" (2014)	"Giant Peach" (2015)

Music video
- "Moaning Lisa Smile" on YouTube

"Moaning Lisa Smile" is a song by English alternative rock band Wolf Alice. It was released on 3 April 2014 as a single from their second EP, Creature Songs (2014). It also appears on the US edition of their debut album, My Love Is Cool (2015). The song reached number 9 on the Alternative Songs chart and was nominated for the Grammy Award for Best Rock Performance at the 58th Annual Grammy Awards. The song was re-released as a single in April 2015 in the US, marking their first single release in the US. It was released on vinyl with "Giant Peach" featured as a B-side.

== Live performances ==
The band made their US TV debut on Conan on 16 June 2015 with a performance of "Moaning Lisa Smile". They also performed the song on The Late Late Show with James Corden on 11 August.

== In popular culture ==
"Moaning Lisa Smile" is featured in an episode of The Leftovers. It also appeared in the promotional trailer of Arrow''s mid-season three premiere, as well as on the soundtrack of the video game MLB The Show 16. In January 2018, the song featured in BBC One's promotional trailer for Baptiste.

== Music video ==
The music video for "Moaning Lisa Smile" was uploaded to the band's YouTube channel on 26 May 2014. It was directed by Ozzie Pullin. Lead singer Ellie Rowsell stated that the song was inspired by their "favorite 8-year-old girl, Lisa Simpson," further elaborating: "We wanted to create a Lisa-type character and follow her in a pursuit to happiness. Although faced with obstacles in the shape of some nasty bitches, Lisa soon finds the group who make her feel like she belongs."

== Track listing ==
US 7" single

1. "Moaning Lisa Smile" – 2:40
2. "Giant Peach" – 4:30

== Personnel ==
Credits adapted from the liner notes of "Moaning Lisa Smile".

- Catherine Marks – production, mixing
- Paul Edouard Laurendeau – engineering
- Robin Schmidt – mastering

== Charts ==
Chart (2015)	Peak position
US Alternative Airplay (Billboard)	9
