= The Last Man on Earth (song) =

Single by Wolf Alice

from the album Blue Weekend
- Released: 24 February 2021
- Genre: Dream pop; neo-psychedelia
- Length: 4:21
- Label: Dirty Hit; RCA
- Songwriters: Ellen Rowsell; Jonathan Oddie; Joel Amey; Theodore Ellis
- Producer: Markus Dravs

Wolf Alice singles chronology
"Space & Time" (2018)	"The Last Man on Earth" (2021)	"Smile" (2021)

Music video
- "The Last Man on Earth" on YouTube

"The Last Man on Earth" is a song by English alternative rock band Wolf Alice. It was released on 24 February 2021 as the lead single for their third studio album, Blue Weekend.

== Background ==
"The Last Man on Earth" was the band's first single in almost 3 years, following an extensive tour through 2018 and early 2019 for their second album, Visions of a Life. Frontwoman Ellie Rowsell said this about the lyrics of the song:

"It's about the arrogance of humans. I'd just read Kurt Vonnegut's Cat's Cradle and I had written the line 'Peculiar travel suggestions are dancing lessons from god' in my notes. But then I thought: 'Uh, your peculiar travel suggestion isn't a dancing lesson from god, it's just a travel suggestion! Why does everything need to mean something more?'"

== Live performances ==
The band first played "The Last Man on Earth" live on 5 March 2021, as a pre-recorded video for Later... with Jools Holland. A month later, on 13 April, they shared another performance of the track on their YouTube channel, in a room lit with candles and spotlights.

== Charts ==
Weekly chart performance for "The Last Man on Earth"
Chart (2021–2022)	Peak position
Mexico Ingles Airplay (Billboard)	19
US Alternative Airplay (Billboard)	33
UK Indie (Official Charts)	32
UK Singles Sales (Official Charts)	25

== Certifications ==
Certifications for "The Last Man on Earth"
Region	Certification	Certified units/sales
United Kingdom (BPI)	Silver	200,000^{‡}
^{‡} Sales+streaming figures based on certification alone.

== Release history ==
Release dates and formats for "The Last Man on Earth"
Region	Date	Format(s)	Label(s)	Ref.
Various	February 24, 2021	digital download; streaming	Dirty Hit	
United States	April 4, 2022	Adult alternative radio	RCA	
United States	April 5, 2022	Alternative radio	RCA	
