= Creature Songs =

EP by Wolf Alice
- Released: 26 May 2014
- Genre: Grunge; folk
- Length: 12:25
- Label: Dirty Hit
- Producer: Catherine Marks

Wolf Alice chronology
Blush (2013)	Creature Songs (2014)	My Love Is Cool (2015)

Singles from Creature Songs
- 1. "Moaning Lisa Smile" Released: 3 April 2014

Creature Songs is the third extended play (EP) by English alternative rock band Wolf Alice. It was released on 26 May 2014 through Dirty Hit. The EP was produced by Catherine Marks. The EP was preceded by the release of "Moaning Lisa Smile", which was uploaded to the band's SoundCloud page.

== Composition ==
Barnabas Abraham of The 405 said "Creature Songs features a more aggressive edge that marks itself on the EP's opening two tracks, and overall the EP is another refreshing sample of a group who carry an infectious energy." NME's Rhian Daly described the EP is a mix of "dark folk and grisly grunge," further elaborating: "It's an approach that makes the London four piece a moodier, gothier Metric, but at least they're upfront about it on this new EP. The first half – 'Moaning Lisa Smile' and 'Storms' ("My demon's my friend, so fight me") – comes on like the ritual sacrifice of Throwing Muses with Courtney Love's rustiest guitar strings before 'Heavenly Creatures' and 'We Are Not The Same' indulge their softer psychedelic doom-folk side, the dejected calm after the massacre." Emma Swann of DIY characterized the EP as "2014 grunge", and added: "The angst oozing from the guitars of Ellie and bandmate Joff Oddie is tangible, whether accompanied by the yells of single 'Moaning Lisa Smile' and the even fiercer follow-up 'Storms', or the near-whispers of final two 'Heavenly Creatures' and 'We're Not The Same'."

== Critical reception ==
Professional ratings
Review scores
Source	Rating
The 405	7.5/10
DIY	5/5 stars
The Line of Best Fit	7/10
NME	4/5 stars

DIY critic Emma Swann wrote, "It's definitely an EP of two halves: Wolf Alice can – and do – ace both loud and quiet. There's 'Moaning Lisa Smile' with a chorus that's nothing short of glorious, and some deft sonic layering – putting Ellie's powerful vocals over impeccable hooks and repeated aural blasts. And 'Storms' is even louder. The gem of the EP, it's blistering, riff-driven grunge with a pop chorus that's guaranteed to cause mayhem wherever it's played. It's fucking massive." Barnabas Abraham of The 405 stated that the EP is "much more ambitious in its aim, and succeeds for the most part. It's slower, more down-tempo, but scales the subtleties in sounds used. It's a really well balanced track, drawing itself along nicely," and concluded his review saying: "If we're to see a studio album from Wolf Alice, you'd kinda hope it kicks the face off whatever target it chooses to go for. Creature Songs suggests they've got the balls to do just that."

== Track listing ==
All tracks are written by Wolf Alice

No.	Title	Length
1.	"Moaning Lisa Smile"	2:40
2.	"Storms"	3:24
3.	"Heavenly Creatures"	3:17
4.	"We're Not the Same"	3:04
Total length:		12:25

== Personnel ==
Credits adapted from the liner notes of Creature Songs.

- Catherine Marks – production, mixing
- Paul Edouard Laurendeau – engineering
- John Davis – mastering
