= Blush (EP) =

EP by Wolf Alice
- Released: 7 October 2013
- Recorded: June–July 2013
- Genre: Alternative rock; indie rock
- Length: 13:22
- Label: Chess Club
- Producer: Austen Jux-Chandler

Wolf Alice chronology
Wolf Alice (2010)	Blush (2013)	Creature Songs (2014)

Singles from Blush
- 1. "She" Released: 15 August 2013

Blush is the second extended play (EP) by English alternative rock band Wolf Alice. It was released on 7 October 2013 by Chess Club Records. The EP was produced by Austen Jux-Chandler. "She" was the first song to come from the EP, which was uploaded to the band's SoundCloud page.

== Background ==
Shortly after the release of "Bros", also a Jux-Chandler production, Wolf Alice recorded new songs. On 15 August 2013, their new song, "She", premiered on Huw Stephens' radio show. Later on that day, the song was featured on the NME website, and was then later uploaded on SoundCloud by Wolf Alice. Pre-orders for the EP were put up on Rough Trade's website, which is on limited-edition 10-inch vinyl.

== Track listing ==
No.	Title	Length
1.	"Blush"	4:19
2.	"She"	3:12
3.	"Nosedive"	2:47
4.	"Ninety Mile Beach"	3:44

== Personnel ==
Credits adapted from the liner notes of Blush.

- Dan Grech – mixing
- Barry Grint – mastering
- Austen Jux-Chandler – engineering, production
- Tom Upex – assistant engineering
