= Ellie Rowsell =

English singer and musician

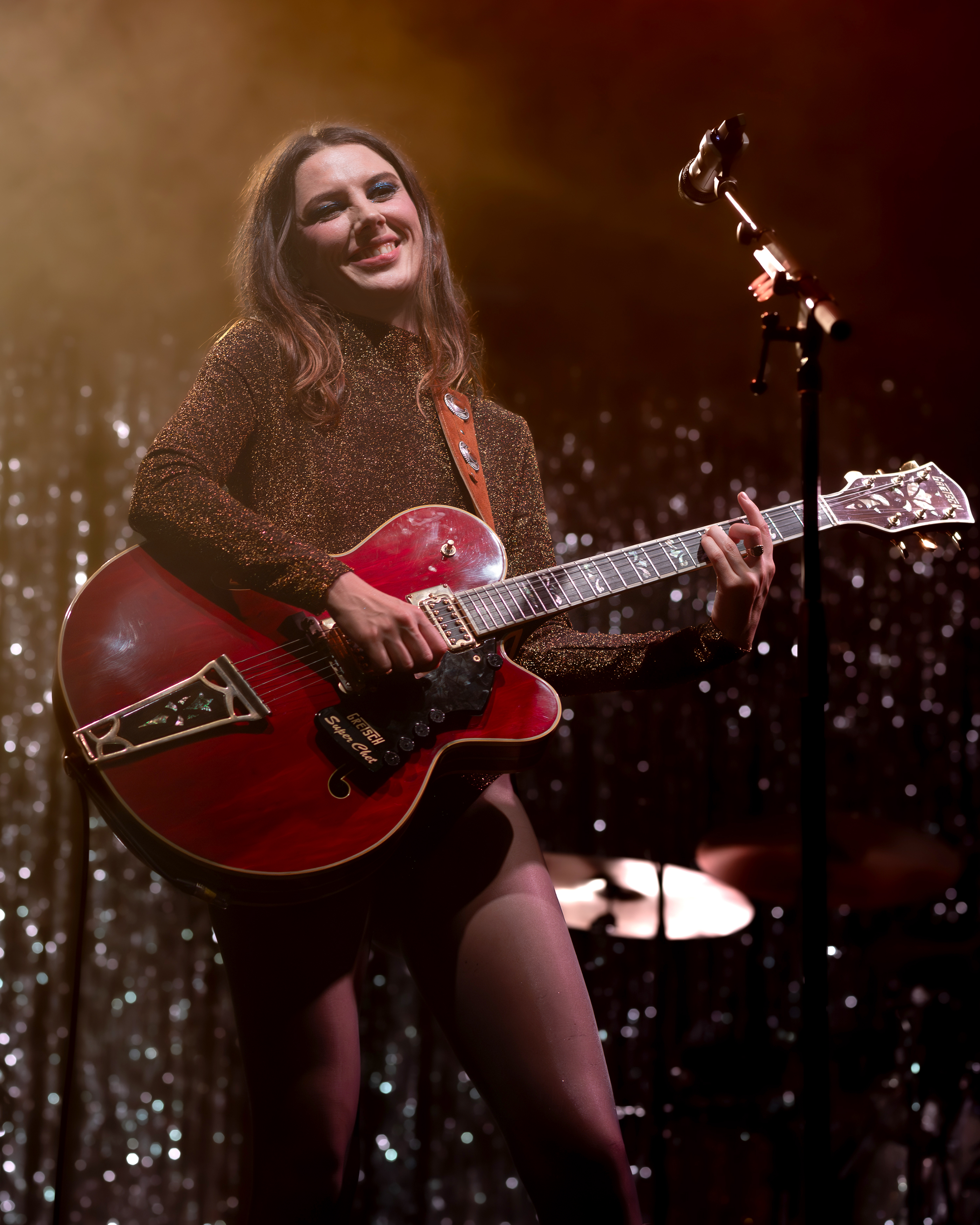
- Rowsell with Wolf Alice in 2025

Background information
- Born: Ellen Ciara Rowsell; 19 July 1992 (age 33); Archway, London, England
- Genres: Alternative rock; indie rock; shoegaze
- Occupations: Singer; musician; songwriter
- Instruments: Vocals; guitar; keyboards; synthesizer
- Years active: 2010–present
- Labels: Dirty Hit; RCA
- Member of: Wolf Alice

Ellen Ciara "Ellie" Rowsell (born 19 July 1992) is an English singer and musician from London. She is the lead vocalist and guitarist of the indie rock band Wolf Alice. She has a soprano voice.

== Early life ==
Rowsell was born on 19 July 1992 in Archway, North London, and grew up in an Irish community. Her paternal grandfather and grandmother were from Dublin. She studied at the Camden School for Girls from 2003 to 2010. At school, Rowsell wrote stories and poetry, picking up the guitar at the age of 14 and later developing her songwriting using GarageBand.

== Personal life ==
In October 2018, Rowsell denied reports that she was engaged to fellow musician Isaac Holman.

In February 2021, Rowsell publicly accused rock singer Marilyn Manson of upskirting her with a GoPro backstage at a music festival. Her accusations came in the wake of a wave of abuse allegations made against Manson.

=== Political views ===
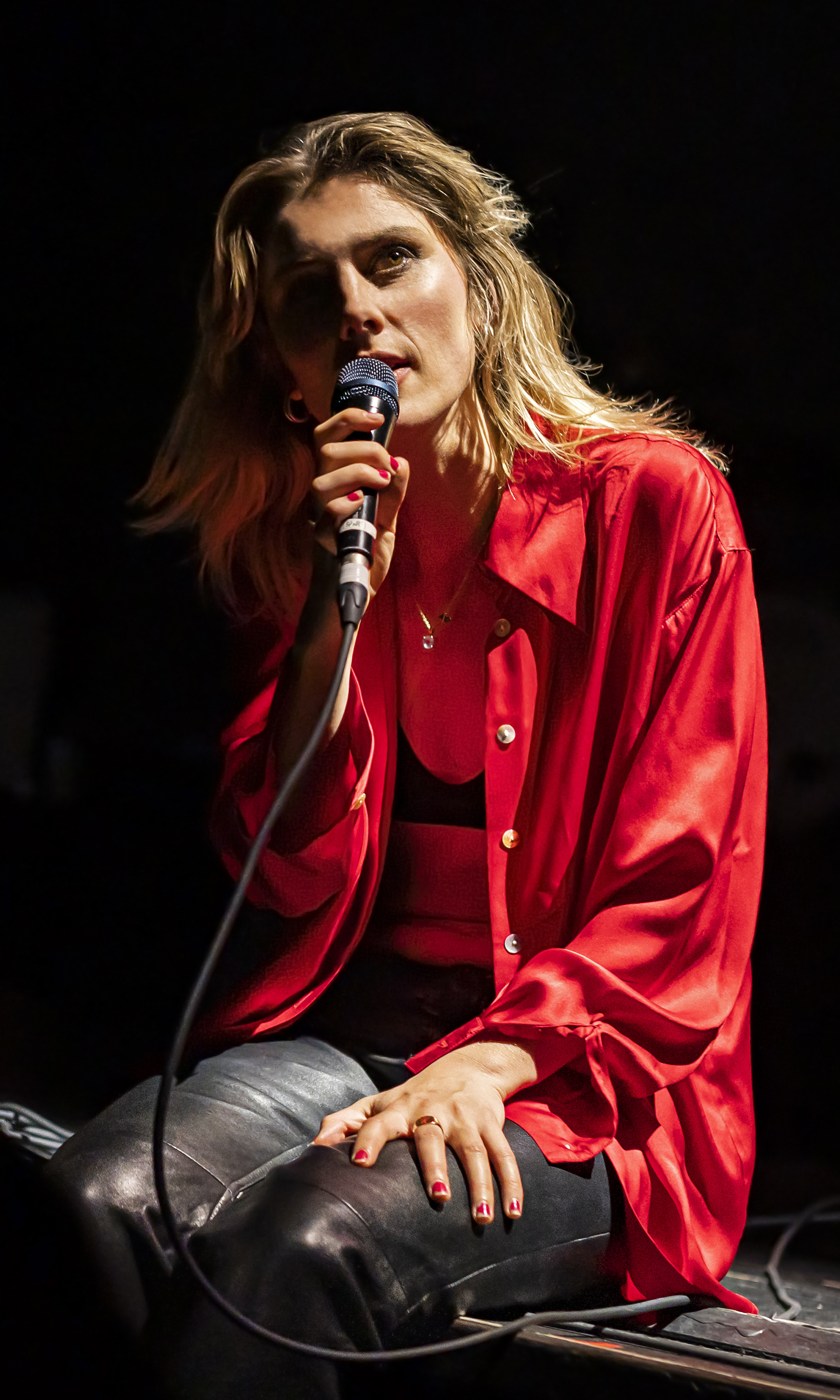
Rowsell with Wolf Alice in 2022

During the 2017 United Kingdom general election, Rowsell endorsed the Labour Party, calling the vote "a vote between the fair and the unfair". She was a vocal supporter of former Labour Party leader Jeremy Corbyn. In October 2017, Corbyn encouraged his supporters via Twitter to buy the Wolf Alice album Visions of a Life, to try to send it to No. 1 on the UK Albums Chart during its high-profile race against the Shania Twain album Now, saying he was "returning the favour" following the group's support of him during the 2017 general election.

== Discography ==
=== Singles ===
As featured artist

Title	Year	Album
"3WW" (alt-J featuring Ellie Rowsell)	2017	Relaxer
"Deadcrush" (alt-J featuring Ellie Rowsell)	2017	Relaxer
"Teenage Headache Dreams" (Mura Masa featuring Ellie Rowsell)	2020	R.Y.C
"Call Me a Lioness" (with Olivia Dean, Melanie C, Shura, Marika Hackman, Rachel Chinouriri, Jasmine Jethwa, Rose Gray, Highlyy, Al Greenwood & Self Esteem)	2023	Non-album single
Lost Everything (Thy Slaughter featuring Ellie Rowsell)	2023	Soft Rock
