= The Armed discography =

- Studio albums: 6
- EPs: 4
- Live albums: 3
- Compilation albums: 1
- Music videos: 21

The discography of The Armed, an anonymous American hardcore punk musical collective, consists of six studio albums, three live albums, one limited release compilation album, three extended plays (EPs), one split EP, ten singles, and twenty-one music videos.

== Albums ==
=== Studio albums ===
List of studio albums, with select details
Title	Album details	Ref.
These Are Lights	Released: September 25, 2009; Label: self-released; Formats: Digital download	
Untitled	Released: June 23, 2015; Label: No Rest Until Ruin; Formats: Digital download, vinyl	
Only Love	Released: April 27, 2018; Label: No Rest Until Ruin; Formats: Digital download, vinyl	
Ultrapop	Released: April 16, 2021; Label: Sargent House; Formats: Digital download, CD, vinyl	
Perfect Saviors	Released: August 25, 2023; Label: Sargent House; Formats: Digital download, CD, vinyl	
The Future Is Here and Everything Needs to Be Destroyed	Released: August 1, 2025; Label: Sargent House; Formats: Digital download	

=== Live albums ===
List of live albums, with select details
Title	Album details	Ref.
Unanticipated	Released: June 17, 2016; Label: No Rest Until Ruin; Formats: Digital download	
Adult Swim Festival '21	Released: January 7, 2022; Label: Sargent House; Formats: Digital download	
Ultrapop: Live at the Masonic	Released: July 15, 2022; Label: Sargent House; Formats: Digital download, vinyl	

=== Compilation albums ===
List of compilation albums, with select details
Title	Album details	Additional information	Ref.
09-11	Released: 2011; Label: self-released; Formats: Vinyl	Limited run of 100 copies.	

== Extended plays ==
List of extended plays
Title	Extended play details	Additional information	Ref.
Common Enemies	Released: May 11, 2010; Label: No Rest Until Ruin; Formats: Digital download, vinyl		
Young & Beautiful	Released: October 11, 2011; Label: No Rest Until Ruin; Formats: Digital download		
Spreading Joy	Released: December 11, 2012; Label: No Rest Until Ruin; Formats: Digital download, vinyl		
The Armed / Tharsis They Split	Released: December 17, 2013; Label: No Rest Until Ruin; Formats: Digital download, vinyl	Split EP	

== Singles ==
List of singles, showing year released and album name
Title	Year	Album	Ref.
"Ft. Frank Turner"	2019	Non-album single	
"All Futures"	2021	Ultrapop	
"Average Death"	2021	Ultrapop	
"An Iteration"	2021	Ultrapop	
"Sport of Form"	2023	Perfect Saviors	
"Everything's Glitter"	2023	Perfect Saviors	
"Liar 2"	2023	Perfect Saviors	
"Well Made Plan"	2025	The Future Is Here and Everything Needs to Be Destroyed	
"Kingbreaker"	2025	The Future Is Here and Everything Needs to Be Destroyed	
"Sharp Teeth"	2025	The Future Is Here and Everything Needs to Be Destroyed	

== Videography ==
=== Music videos ===
List of music videos, showing year released and directors
Title	Year	Director	Ref.
"Liar"	2010	Uncredited	
"No Rest Until Ruin"	2012	Dave Graw	
"Sterling Results"	2013	Uncredited	
"Forever Scum"	2015	The Armed	
"Paradise Day"	2015	Uncredited	
"Polarizer"	2015	Uncredited	
"Future Drugs (Live)"	2016	Uncredited	
"Mujahoudini"	2016	Uncredited	
"Witness"	2018	Tony Wolski	
"Role Models"	2018	Tony Wolski	
"Nowhere to be Found"	2018	Tony Wolski	
"Heavily Lined"	2018	Tony Wolski	
"Ft. Frank Turner"	2019	Tony Wolski	
"All Futures (Live)"	2021	Aaron Jones	
"Sport of Form"	2023	Wolski	
"Everything's Glitter"	2023	Wolski	
"Liar 2"	2023	Wolski	
"Modern Vanity" (Note: The music video for "Modern Vanity" was uploaded to YouTube with the title "Was This the HOTTEST House Party EVER?!".)	2023	Christopher Gruse	
"Well Made Plan"	2025	Christopher Gruse	
"Kingbreaker"	2025	Wolski and Jones	
"Sharp Teeth"	2025	Wolski and Jones	
