= Beautifully Unconventional =

Single by Wolf Alice

from the album Visions of a Life
- Released: 14 August 2017
- Genre: Indie rock; pop-funk
- Length: 2:13
- Label: Dirty Hit
- Songwriters: Ellen Rowsell; Jonathan Oddie; Joel Amey; Theodore Ellis
- Producer: Justin Meldal-Johnsen

Wolf Alice singles chronology
"Don't Delete the Kisses" (2017)	"Beautifully Unconventional" (2017)	"Heavenward" (2017)

Music video
- "Beautifully Unconventional" on YouTube

"Beautifully Unconventional" is a song by English alternative rock band Wolf Alice from their second studio album, Visions of a Life. It was released on 14 August 2017 through Dirty Hit as the album's third single.

== Release and live performances ==
"Beautifully Unconventional" premiered on Annie Mac's BBC Radio 1 show on 14 August 2017, and subsequently released for digital download and streaming services. Rowsell said she wrote the song about one of her friends: "My feelings towards her reminded me of the film Heathers, where everyone is a Heather and you find your other non-Heather… a 'you can be my partner in crime', sorta thing."

The band performed the song live for the first time on 26 July at the Echo in Los Angeles. It has since been part of their setlist on tour. The song was also part of the band's Live Lounge session on 19 September. On 17 October, they performed the song on Later... with Jools Holland.

== Composition ==
"Beautifully Unconventional" is based around a "chunky guitar line." Will Richards of DIY compared the song to American singer Beck, and noted the influence on the song from the song's producer Justin Meldal-Johnsen, who's best known for his work with the singer. Orignte classified the song as indie rock, while the Guardian's Dave Simpson characterized it as pop-funk, later stating that it "might even have a faint melodic nod to Aretha Franklin's "Respect"." NME's Will Butler noted that the song "leans closer to the softer, warmer and catchy stylings of 'Don't Delete the Kisses' than it does the furious, punk sputter of 'Yuk Foo'."

== Critical reception ==
Drowned in Sound's Dom Gourlay said the song "finds the band traversing the world of pop at its most conventional. Once again highlighting Rowsell's gift for observational storytelling, it's a delightful spanner in the works that draws several hundred gasps of adulation from those present." Robin Murry of Clash said the song is "a rallying cry, the choppy guitar lines proving to be overpowering without every venturing into the obvious," continuing: "The stuttering vocal continually reaches outwards, and we can already see this becoming a live anthem." Dork wrote, "it's a retro-cinematic delight. An earworm fed on other, lesser siblings, it has a confident, Diet Coke commercial strut. It knows it looks good, and it's not afraid to flaunt it."

== Music video ==
A 50s-inspired music video for the song was uploaded the band's Vevo channel on YouTube on 11 September 2017. Rowsell told the Fader regarding the video that the song is "a celebration of all your non-conforming friends; a celebration of individuality and the adventures that come with embracing that. For me personally, I imagined me and my mate Hannah as Christian Slater and Winona Ryder in Heathers (albeit looking nothing like them). The video has nothing to do with the song — I just didn't want to have a mullet anymore, seeing as lots of people tore me to pieces in our last video, so it was an excuse to wear a wig."

== Certifications ==
Certifications for "Beautifully Unconventional"
Region	Certification	Certified units/sales
United Kingdom (BPI)	Silver	200,000^{‡}
^{‡} Sales+streaming figures based on certification alone.
