= Heavenward =

Single by Wolf Alice

from the album Visions of a Life
- Released: 18 September 2017
- Genre: Shoegaze
- Length: 4:55
- Label: Dirty Hit
- Songwriters: Ellen Rowsell; Jonathan Oddie; Joel Amey; Theodore Ellis
- Producer: Justin Meldal-Johnsen

Wolf Alice singles chronology
"Beautifully Unconventional" (2017)	"Heavenward" (2017)	"Formidable Cool" (2018)

Music video
- "Heavenward" on YouTube

"Heavenward" is a song by English alternative rock band Wolf Alice from their second studio album, Visions of a Life. It was released on 18 September 2017 through Dirty Hit as the album's fourth single.

== Writing and recording ==
In a track by track breakdown for Consequence of Sound, drummer Joel Amey said:

"I feel like "Heavenward" was one of the first ideas we really got to grips with; we have a few demo versions floating around, one of which was made in our manager's office basement and from which the opening build up noise is lifted. That passage always set such a mood and tone and for me that I couldn't have imagined it as anything other than the opener. The guitars are so dense and there are so many nuances that we had to think carefully about how the sonics of the other instruments should sit; we wanted to avoid classic 'radio rock' drums and keep them almost small in size to really push the walls of guitar noise. It's a favourite of mine, especially lyrically, but also for Joff's guitar anti-solo that comes in the middle 8th. I won't reveal how he gets the sound, but so far some people we've shown it to have said it's a saxophone or a set of distorted bagpipes which should give you an indication of the way Joff approaches the guitar!"

== Release and live performances ==
"Heavenward" premiered on Zane Lowe's Beats 1 radio show, and subsequently released for digital download and streaming. According to a press release, the song is about the death of a friend.

Wolf Alice performed the song in October 2017 as part of their set at their performance on KCRW's Morning Becomes Eclectic program. They also performed the song on WKQX's The Sound Lounge session in April 2018.

== Composition ==
The Fader described the song as "mournful shoegaze." Varsity said the song "sounds like a continuation of their debut, with dreamy melodies emerging out of a shoegaze wall of fuzzy feedback and dissonant guitars. But from that point onwards, you're on a musical mystery tour of the wacky and unexpected."

== Music video ==
The music video for "Heavenward" was uploaded to the band's Vevo channel on 26 September 2017. The video was directed by Andy DeLuca, and follows the band on tour.
