= Don't Delete the Kisses =

Single by Wolf Alice

from the album Visions of a Life
- Released: 5 July 2017
- Genre: Alternative rock; dream pop; synth-pop; shoegaze
- Length: 4:35
- Label: Dirty Hit
- Songwriters: Ellen Rowsell; Jonathan Oddie; Joel Amey; Theodore Ellis
- Producer: Justin Meldal-Johnsen

Wolf Alice singles chronology
"Yuk Foo" (2017)	"Don't Delete the Kisses" (2017)	"Beautifully Unconventional" (2017)

Music video
- "Don't Delete the Kisses" on YouTube

"Don't Delete the Kisses" is a song by English alternative rock band Wolf Alice from their second studio album, Visions of a Life. It was released on 5 July 2017 through Dirty Hit as the album's second single. It was the band's first single to chart on the UK Top 100 (following being performed twice when the band won the 2018 Mercury Music Prize in September 2018) and the first one to chart on the main UK charts since Bros in 2015. The track also peaked at 16 on the Kerrang! Rock Chart in July 2017.

== Release ==
The band announced on 3 July 2017 that they would be premiering the second single from Visions of a Life on Beats 1 on 5 July. The song was released to streaming services and digital download following its premiere. In an interview with Matt Wilkinson of Beats 1, the band described the song as "the most synth-heavy tune" they have made. Lead vocalist Ellie Rowsell additionally stated:

"I kind of wanted to make one of those head out the window on a long drive tunes. And I wanted to try my hand at like a hold-nothing-back love song. That was my thoughts. But other than that I just kinda let it go where it wanted to go… I just think if you hold back it will sound worse won't it?". Regarding the sound of the album, they added: "I think hopefully when people hear the whole thing it won't be so all over the place. There are things that tie the 'Yuk Foos' and 'Don't Delete The Kisses' together if you know what I mean. There's hopefully something for everyone. I too struggle to define it."

In an interview with The Fader, Rowsell stated that she wanted to write a love song, but was "not going to hold back and make it discreet. I wanted to make it really obvious what I'm talking about. I was going to keep it sad, in the vein of the first couple of verses, and then I was like Nah, it's too depressing to have a love story that doesn't work out. I'm gonna Hollywood it, and make it happy."

== Composition ==
"Don't Delete the Kisses" was characterized as a dream pop, synth-pop, shoegaze, and indie rock song. The Line of Best Fit said the song "melts krautrock-tinged rhythms with chugging dreamy-pop vibes. It's spaced-out and grand, with an unending amount of freedom and hard-hitting charm." Hey Nineteen noted that "while "Yuk Foo" encapsulates rage, "Don't Delete The Kisses" deals with reckless, youthful love," further stating that "Wolf Alice once again hurl themselves into the eye of the hurricane here, grappling with the nitty-gritty, warts-and-all realities that come with puppy-love, bringing them to life in shining, euphoric indie rock." Hot Press said the song "replaces the vitriol and aggression of previously shared single "Yuk Foo" with a smouldering, surging electronic pulse which ramps up the erotic tension. This is pushed over the top by rapturous spoken-word verses and a delirious, love-drunk atmosphere."

Consequence said "the song is a dreamy haze that sounds like a synthpop outfit caught gazing at their shoes, loops of guitars swirling around ticking percussion. Ellie Rowsell's vocals are echoing whispers on the verses and pleading calls on the chorus as she wrestles with the nettlesome doubt that comes with what passes for romance in the modern era." Paste and Baeble Music both described the track as "light" and "dreamy," in contrast to the aggressive "Yuk Foo", with the latter publication adding: "Ellie Rowsell delivers the verses in a delicate, almost angelic way, and adds a bit more power to her voice for a chant-like chorus. That, teamed with the gentle guitars, giving the song a whimsical, shoegaze-y vibe". Similarly, Clash said the song "displays a slightly softer, sensual, more shoegaze-inclined methodology from the group."

== Critical reception ==
NME writer Rhian Daly praised the song, saying it is "in short, incredible. Its verses are like a continuation of My Love Is Cool's "The Wonderwhy", in that frontwoman Ellie Rowsell softly speaks her words instead of singing them," adding: "To call it cinematic is something of an understatement – this is super wide-screen, the sharpest technicolour, so HD you can almost see their guitar strings sparkling with each note and the air around the drums crunching with each beat. Musically, it's unlike anything Wolf Alice have done before. It's the very definition of ambitious, a shimmering, golden piece of atmospheric indie that will make you feel like you're drifting 40,000 feet above the clouds, looking down at Earth through a marshmallow patchwork."

Hey Nineteen stated that the song "is more than whetting our appetites for what is shaping up to be one of the best albums of the year." Dork said the song is "obviously great", while noting that it is "a hazy departure from the epic assault of 'Yuk Foo'" Gabriela Gurycz of The Edge wrote: "Wolf Alice haven't lost any of the fragility that made their last album so special. The song is sweet if nothing more and is perfect for pining after someone you love on summer evenings."

== Music video ==
The song's accompanying music video was uploaded to the band's Vevo channel on YouTube on 11 August 2017, and was directed by Sophie Muller. The video stars Chelsea Edge and Jack Anderson as a young couple aboard the London Underground.

== In media ==
The song was featured at the end of the first episode of the Netflix series Heartstopper. The show's second season featured another Wolf Alice song, "The Beach", off their 2021 album Blue Weekend.

The song was also featured at the end of the eighth and final episode of the Starz limited series Gaslit.

The song also featured in the first season of the Amazon Prime Video TV series Gen V.

== Charts ==
Chart (2018)	Peak position
Scottish Singles Sales (Official Charts)	74
UK Singles (Official Charts)	100

== Certifications ==
Certifications for "Don't Delete the Kisses"
Region	Certification	Certified units/sales
Australia (ARIA)	Gold	35,000^{‡}
New Zealand (RMNZ)	Gold	15,000^{‡}
United Kingdom (BPI)	Platinum	600,000^{‡}
^{‡} Sales+streaming figures based on certification alone.
