= Sadboy =

Single by Wolf Alice

from the album Visions of a Life
- Released: 2 March 2018
- Genre: Psychedelic rock, psychedelic folk
- Length: 3:30
- Label: Dirty Hit
- Songwriters: Ellen Rowsell; Jonathan Oddie; Joel Amey; Theodore Ellis
- Producer: Justin Meldal-Johnsen

Wolf Alice singles chronology
"Formidable Cool" (2017)	"Sadboy" (2018)	"Space & Time" (2018)

Music video
- "Sadboy" on YouTube

"Sadboy" is a song by British alternative rock band Wolf Alice from their second studio album Visions of a Life. It was released on 2 March 2018 through Dirty Hit as the album's sixth single.

== Writing and recording ==
In a track by track breakdown for Consequence of Sound, guitarist Joff Oddie said:

""Sadboy" was one of the latest additions to the record. Stemming from a bizarre kind of electronic Brian Jonestown Massacre demo that Ellie had created with de-tuned acoustic guitars and multiple character vocals we set about creating a live "Wolf Alice" version in our rehearsal space. The main body (or first half) was conceived fairly quickly but the later half had a few different incarnations from an instrumental version to a feature artist spot. It wasn't until some time later when we were in a preproduction studio in LA and we were banging our heads together trying to work out what happens in that particular section when Ellie said to give her playback of the track and a microphone and she would ad-lib something. In classic Ellie form she found a part that was both musically, lyrically and contextually perfect for the section within her first two takes and had all us lads jumping around the control room setting off our airhorn apps."

== Live performances ==
"Sadboy" was performed on The Late Show with Stephen Colbert on 30 November 2017.

== Music video ==
The music video for "Sadboy" was uploaded on the band's Vevo channel on YouTube on 5 March 2018. The video follows lead singer, Ellie Rowsell through a psychedelic night in a B movie style clip.
