= Spectacle (disambiguation) =

A spectacle is an event that is memorable for the appearance it creates.

Spectacle or spectacles may also refer to:

== Science and technology ==
- Spectacle (software), a screenshot software by KDE
- Spectacle, the toolset for packaging maintenance of MeeGo
- Brille, a glassy covering of the eye found in some animals

== Arts, entertainment, and media ==
- Spectacle (band), a 1990s indie pop band
- "Spectacle", a song by Velvet Revolver from Contraband
- Spectacle: Elvis Costello with..., a music show starring Elvis Costello, appearing on the Sundance Channel (United States)
- Spectacles, the autobiography of Sue Perkins
- The Spectacles (short story), by Edgar Allan Poe

== Other uses ==
- Spectacle (critical theory), a central notion in the Situationist theory developed by Guy Debord
- Spectacles (product), camera glasses sold by Snap Inc
- The Spectacles, Western Australia, a suburb of Perth
- Spectacles, eyeglasses
- The spectacle (Abrostola tripartita), a noctuid moth found in Asia and Europe

== See also ==
- Spectacle Island (disambiguation)
