= Visitation (Division Day album) =

Studio album by Division Day
- Released: 18 August 2009
- Genre: Alternative Rock
- Length: 42:09
- Label: Dangerbird Records
- Producer: Justin Meldal-Johnsen

Division Day chronology
Beartrap Island (2007)	Visitation (2009)	Bullet in the Rain - EP (2010)

Visitation is the second studio album by the Los Angeles-based alternative rock band Division Day, released on 18 August 2009 through Dangerbird Records. After splitting from their original label — Eenie Meenie Records — the band decided to self-fund these recordings (signing to Dangerbird after all was said and done), and brought in Justin Meldal-Johnsen (Nine Inch Nails, Beck, M83) to produce the album. Todd Burke (Ben Harper, The Kooks) was also brought to handle the engineering duties. With most of the tracks nearly-completed by the time they made it into the studio, JMJ and the band were able to record the album relatively quickly; after just ten days at The Bank in Burbank, the album was finished.

== Track listing ==
All tracks are written by Division Day

No.	Title	Length
1.	"Reservoir"	2:44
2.	"Malachite"	3:41
3.	"Chalk Lines"	3:26
4.	"Azalean"	4:12
5.	"Devil Light"	4:48
6.	"Planchette"	3:13
7.	"Surrender"	3:07
8.	"Carrier"	3:59
9.	"Visitation"	2:59
10.	"My Prisoner"	4:50
11.	"Black Crow"	5:10
