= Something Loud =

Single by Jimmy Eat World

from the album Something(s) Loud
- Released: June 10, 2022
- Genre: Pop rock
- Length: 3:16
- Label: Exotic Location
- Producers: Justin Meldal-Johnsen, Jimmy Eat World

Jimmy Eat World singles chronology
"Love Never" (2019)	"Something Loud" (2022)	"Place Your Debts" (2022)

"Something Loud" is a song by American rock band, Jimmy Eat World. It was released on June 10, 2022 as the band's first independent single on their label, Exotic Location.

== Background ==
Having released their 2019 album, Surviving, only a few months before the start of the COVID-19 pandemic, the band members elected not to use their time in lockdown writing new music like many other artists did. Frontman Jim Adkins explained the emotional and physical drain from recently writing and releasing Surviving had put a lot of stress on him, and he felt he wasn't yet in the right mindset to be writing new music.

As COVID restrictions began to reduce and live music returned, the band found themselves becoming more and more excited about playing shows again, which Adkins used as inspiration when he returned to more frequent songwriting. Ultimately, this excitement was what inspired the lyrics for "Something Loud", with Adkins and drummer Zach Lind discussing the When We Were Young music festival as a more specific influence.

"I guess a lot of those bands on that show are part of the scene that we spent a lot of time sleeping on floors and playing to nobody in, and then [become] very popular all of a sudden, it's just sort of like 'huh, that's weird'. Like none of those were around when we were actually doing that, and the fact that it still connects with everybody is, or you know a large amount of people, it's just... I don't know, it gives you pause." - Jim Adkins

The song is also a retrospective on the band's career, as the lyrics recount their early days of touring and how they've grown over the years. Adkins discussed these themes in a press statement on the song, feeling that "I thought I made the most of the early band days, I realize now I missed some stuff. You’re in such a hurry to grow out of the formidable years. Like shit, togetherness is going to magically arrive when you hit some age you thought ‘grown-ups’ were. Yeah, it doesn’t work that way. But maybe the thing age and experience do reveal is that pivotal moments are hard to grasp when you are in them."

== Release and reception ==
Prior to releasing the single, the band announced a fall concert tour named after the single without indicating that they would be releasing anything new. "Something Loud" released on June 10, 2022 alongside an accompanying music video. The video was directed by Gavin White, and shows the band playing the song in their studio in black and white, and was dedicated to Mike Gill, who directed the music video for the band's song "555".

Critic reactions to the song were almost entirely positive, with the instrumentals garnering heavy praise. Rhian Daly of NME called the song "punchy", while Rock Cellar's Adrian Garro called it "an aptly titled burst of energy", while also praising the lyrics and Adkins' vocals. Philip Trapp of Loudwire felt the song "keeps things fresh by further distilling what Jimmy Eat World does best — charting youth's bloom through cinematic rock music that doesn't seem to age." Loudwire also went on to call the song one of the best rock releases of June.

== Personnel ==
Jimmy Eat World

- Jim Adkins – lead vocals, guitar
- Rick Burch – bass guitar, backing vocals
- Zach Lind – drums, percussion
- Tom Linton – backing vocals, guitar

Production

- Justin Meldal-Johnsen – producer

== Charts ==
Chart performance for "Something Loud"
Chart (2022)	Peak position
Czech Republic (Modern Rock)	4
US Alternative Airplay (Billboard)	21
US Rock & Alternative Airplay (Billboard)	28
