= Visions of a Life =

Studio album by Wolf Alice
- Released: 29 September 2017
- Genre: Alternative rock; noise rock
- Length: 46:39
- Label: Dirty Hit
- Producer: Justin Meldal-Johnsen

Wolf Alice chronology
My Love Is Cool (2015)	Visions of a Life (2017)	Blue Weekend (2021)

Singles from Visions of a Life
- 1. "Yuk Foo" Released: 12 June 2017; 2. "Don't Delete the Kisses" Released: 5 July 2017; 3. "Beautifully Unconventional" Released: 14 August 2017; 4. "Heavenward" Released: 18 September 2017; 5. "Formidable Cool" Released: 16 February 2018; 6. "Sadboy" Released: 2 March 2018; 7. "Space & Time" Released: 8 May 2018

Visions of a Life is the second studio album by English alternative rock band Wolf Alice, released on 29 September 2017 through Dirty Hit. The album received acclaim from music critics and appeared on several year-end lists, as well as winning the 2018 Mercury Prize.

== Background and release ==
In November 2016, drummer Joel Amey said the band is "very much in the middle of writing some new music." In May 2017, the band teased the album by sending mysterious postcards with song titles and lyrics of each of the album tracks to fans on their mailing list, which they later posted on Twitter. On 12 June, the band premiered the lead single "Yuk Foo" on BBC Radio 1, with a lyric video being later uploaded to the band's Vevo channel on YouTube. They announced the release date of their upcoming album Visions of a Life would be on 29 September 2017. The band stated that the album is "pretty varied" and that they wanted to "come out with a big bang," which is why they chose "Yuk Foo" as the first track to be released, adding that the rest of the album is "pretty different to that." The band announced a world tour in support of the album with the dates being posted to the band's official website. The tour includes their biggest headline show to date at Alexandra Palace in London on 24 November. The album was produced by Justin Meldal-Johnsen.

On 5 July, the band released the second single, "Don't Delete the Kisses", and made the album available for pre-order, along with the reveal of the album cover, which features a photo of lead vocalist Ellie Rowsell's aunt, Helen, "playing the classic game of 'dance round the horse's skull in your Sunday best'". The accompanying music video for "Don't Delete the Kisses" was released on 11 August. The third single, "Beautifully Unconventional", was premiered on Annie Mac's BBC Radio 1 show on 14 August, and was subsequently released for digital download and streaming services. A 1950s-inspired music video was released on 11 September. The band released "Heavenward" as the fourth single on 18 September. The song premiered on Zane Lowe's Beats 1 radio show, and subsequently released for digital download and streaming. According to a press release, the song is about the death of a friend. The album's fifth single, "Formidable Cool", was released on 16 February 2018. On 2 March 2018, "Sadboy" was released as the sixth single, followed by an accompanying music video three days later. "Space & Time" was released on 8 May 2018 as the seventh single. A music video for the song was released on 30 May 2018.

== Composition ==
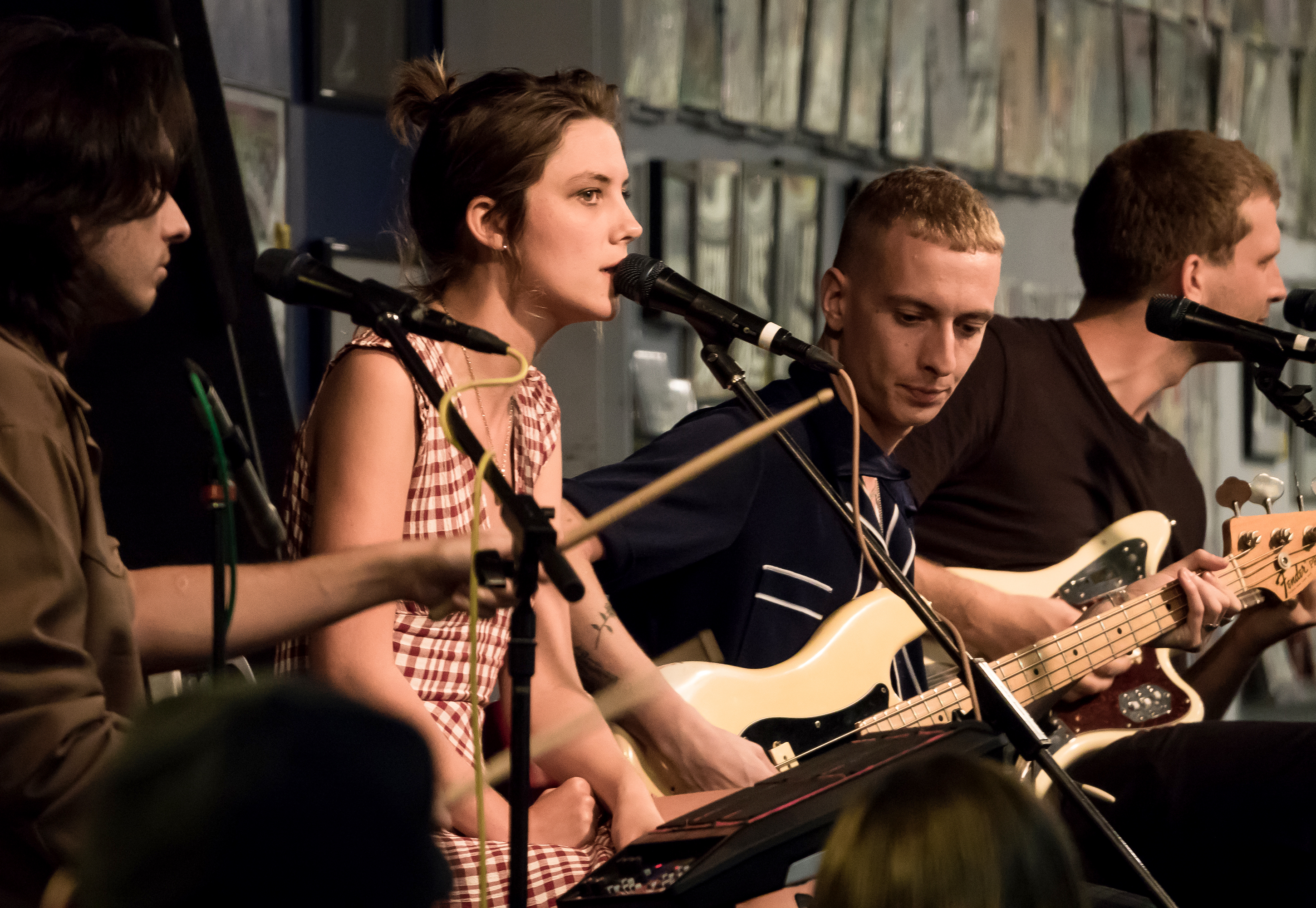
Wolf Alice in 2017

Visions of a Life is primarily an alternative rock and noise rock album, and was noted by numerous critics to take influences from various genres, including shoegaze, punk rock, dream pop, grunge, psychedelia, folk, space rock, synth-pop, hardcore and electronica.

== Critical reception ==
Professional ratings
Aggregate scores
Source	Rating
AnyDecentMusic?	8.0/10
Metacritic	81/100
Review scores
Source	Rating
AllMusic	3.5/5 stars
The A.V. Club	B+
The Guardian	4/5 stars
The Irish Times	4/5 stars
Mojo	4/5 stars
NME	5/5 stars
Pitchfork	7.0/10
Q	4/5 stars
Rolling Stone	4/5 stars
Uncut	6/10

At Metacritic, which assigns a normalised rating out of 100 to reviews from mainstream publications, the album received an average score of 81, based on 21 reviews, indicating "universal acclaim". Rhian Daly of NME called it the album of the year and claimed that "with Visions of a Life Wolf Alice are removing any doubt about their status in the UK music scene. Best band in Britain? 100 per cent." Drowned in Sound's Luke Beardsworth called the album "a phenomenal achievement. It has captured on record the thrill, angst, sadness and uncertainty of being in your twenties and not really knowing what's going to happen or should happen. All of it is never anything less than intoxicating, heartfelt and effortless ... It feels like one of the most crucial, relevant, angry, cool and vibrant records of the decade. Wolf Alice, as fantastic bands tend to, have completely disregarded the idea that a second album should be difficult and turned out a genuine masterpiece." AllMusic's Heather Phares described the album as "a reflection of a young band trying out all its possibilities," and thought it's "more scattered than My Love Is Cool, but its best songs hint at even more potential." The A.V. Club's Gwen Ihnat said "In lesser hands, this kind of sonic disparity could be chaotic and confusing—but with Rowsell's voice as the guiding light, Visions is a captivating, enjoyable ride." Will Richards of DIY said, "there's no difficult second album syndrome here. Visions of a Life is a gorgeously twisted beast that keeps Wolf Alice on the path to being Britain's best band."

Matt the Raven from Under the Radar stated that the album "may be a somewhat inconsistent journey but it's also pure rock and roll splendor from a band that's super talented and not afraid to take chances." Kerrang! stated that "the eclectic sounds of Wolf Alice's debut made them stars, but this sequel finds them doing everything bigger and better." Bella Spencer of The Skinny wrote, "the album caters for all – there are heavy tracks for hardcore fans and songs with a more approachable indie feel for those who need a gentle introduction to the ways of the Wolf. So sit back, relax and scream to your heart's content." In a more mixed review, Consequence of Sound's Geoff Nelson thought that "Visions of a Life is often full, seeming to overflow. But the substance is lacking, resulting in a tiring trip through a band gamely trying not to merely cover itself." In his rave review for musicOMH, critic Craig Jones stated that "there are no low points in this relentless record. At times it is beastly, baring its teeth. At others, it's divinely angelic", continuing: "So relevant and of its moment, touching on the little things which make up our lives then showing utter disdain to the establishment, you'll struggle to find many better albums than Visions of a Life this year."

=== Accolades ===
Publication	Accolade	Year	Rank	Ref.
Drowned in Sound	Favourite Albums of 2017	2017	1	
RIOT Mag	RIOT's Albums Of The Year 2017	2017	6	
NME	Albums of the Year	2017	2	
NME	Best Albums of the Decade	2019	22	
Q	50 Best Albums of 2017	2017	3	

== Commercial performance ==
Visions of a Life debuted at number two on the UK Albums Chart with 19,333 copies sold in its first week, becoming the band's second consecutive album to debut at this position. As of September 2018, the album had sold 57,214 copies in the United Kingdom.

== Track listing ==
All tracks are written by Ellie Rowsell, Joff Oddie, Theo Ellis and Joel Amey.

No.	Title	Length
1.	"Heavenward"	4:55
2.	"Yuk Foo"	2:13
3.	"Beautifully Unconventional"	2:13
4.	"Don't Delete the Kisses"	4:35
5.	"Planet Hunter"	3:52
6.	"Sky Musings"	2:58
7.	"Formidable Cool"	3:33
8.	"Space & Time"	2:27
9.	"Sadboy"	4:11
10.	"St. Purple & Green"	4:21
11.	"After the Zero Hour"	3:24
12.	"Visions of a Life"	7:57
Total length:		46:39

== Personnel ==
Credits adapted from the liner notes of Visions of a Life.

=== Wolf Alice ===
- Ellie Rowsell – vocals, guitar, keyboards, Omnichord, synthesisers
- Joff Oddie – guitar, keyboards, programming, backing vocals, synthesisers
- Theo Ellis – bass, keyboards, synthesisers, backing vocals
- Joel Amey – drums, backing vocals, percussion, keyboards, programming, Omnichord

=== Additional personnel ===
- Justin Meldal-Johnsen – production (all tracks); keyboards, programming (track 6); synthesisers (track 9)
- Tom Elmhirst – mixing
- Carlos de la Garza – engineering (all tracks); additional percussion (tracks 7, 12)
- Mike Schuppan – engineering
- Tyler Shields – engineering assistance
- Dave Cooley – mastering
- Charlie Ellis – backing vocals (track 12)
- Robert O'Hara – design

== Charts ==
Chart (2017)	Peak position
Australian Albums (ARIA)	54
Belgian Albums (Ultratop Flanders)	91
Dutch Albums (Album Top 100)	133
Irish Albums (IRMA)	13
Irish Independent Albums (IRMA)	2
New Zealand Heatseeker Albums (RMNZ)	3
Scottish Albums (OCC)	2
Spanish Albums (Promusicae)	61
Swiss Albums (Schweizer Hitparade)	88
UK Albums (OCC)	2
UK Independent Albums (OCC)	1
US Billboard 200	190
US Top Alternative Albums (Billboard)	25
US Top Rock Albums (Billboard)	39

== Certifications ==
Region	Certification	Certified units/sales
United Kingdom (BPI)	Gold	100,000^{‡}
^{‡} Sales+streaming figures based on certification alone.
