= Perfect Saviors =

Studio album by The Armed
- Released: 25 August 2023
- Length: 41:48
- Label: Sargent House
- Producer: Ben Chisholm; Justin Meldal-Johnsen; Troy Van Leeuwen; Tony Wolski

The Armed chronology
Adult Swim Festival '21 (2022)	Perfect Saviors (2023)	The Future Is Here and Everything Needs to Be Destroyed (2025)

Singles from Perfect Saviors
- 1. "Sport of Form" Released: 27 June 2023; 2. "Everything's Glitter" Released: 18 July 2023; 3. "Liar 2" Released: 7 August 2023

Perfect Saviors is the fifth studio album from the American post-hardcore collective The Armed, released on 25 August 2023.

== Background ==
On 14 June 2023, The Armed tweeted a photo of a billboard with a caption containing the date 27 June 2023. The billboard contained artwork depicting the band's logo and Iggy Pop, appearing to suggest a collaborative release between the two. This collaborative release was later revealed to be the album's first single, "Sport of Form", with Iggy Pop playing God in the accompanying music video. Along with the release of the song, the album's title was announced, Perfect Saviors, with its release date of 25 August 2023 through Sargent House.

The second single was "Everything's Glitter" and was released on 18 July 2023. The third and final single, "Liar 2", was released on 7 August.

== Critical reception ==
Professional ratings
Aggregate scores
Source	Rating
Metacritic	81/100
Review scores
Source	Rating
Exclaim!	8/10
Slant Magazine	3/5 stars
Pitchfork	7.8/10

Perfect Saviors received a score of 81 out of 100 on review aggregator Metacritic based on four critics' reviews, indicating "universal acclaim". Marjo Djurdjic of Exclaim! stated that "although each of the album's 12 songs have their place, the band's maximalist proclivities have clearly spoiled us, leaving a pair of late tracks floundering" and although "the album doesn't have the same immediate impact as Ultrapop", it "will undoubtedly cement the Armed as one of the best, most exciting rock/punk/hardcore/experimental/whatever-you-want-to-call-them bands making music today". Steve Erickson of Slant Magazine felt that the tracks "veer from pretty hooks and acoustic guitar to blast beats" and "linger in an in-between space that doesn't fully embrace either noise or pop".

== Track listing ==
All tracks are written by Kenneth Szymanski, Randal Kupfer, and Tony Wolski.

Perfect Saviors track listing
No.	Title	Length
1.	"Sport of Measure"	2:46
2.	"FKA World"	3:10
3.	"Clone"	3:02
4.	"Modern Vanity"	3:49
5.	"Everything's Glitter"	3:51
6.	"Burned Mind"	4:12
7.	"Sport of Form"	3:27
8.	"Patient Mind"	2:35
9.	"Vatican Under Construction"	3:33
10.	"Liar 2"	3:01
11.	"In Heaven"	3:24
12.	"Public Grieving"	4:58
Total length:		41:48

== Personnel ==
- Bryan Aiken – guitar
- Eric Avery – bass
- Julien Baker – vocals
- Jacob Bannon – vocals
- Cara Drolshagen – vocals
- Dan Greene – songwriter
- Mark Guiliana – drums
- Urian Hackney – drums
- Josh Klinghoffer – guitar
- Randal Lee Kupfer – unspecified instrumentation
- Justin Meldal-Johnsen – co-producer and bass
- Stephen Perkins – percussion
- Patrick Shiroishi – guitar, keyboards
- Chris Slorach – guitar and vocals
- Matt Sweeney – guitar
- Ken Szymanski – bass and guitar
- Sarah Tudzin – vocals and production
- Troy Van Leeuwen – guitar
- Zach Weeks – guitar and production
- Tony Wolski – unspecified instrumentation
