= Moving Units (EP) =

Moving Units EP

EP by Moving Units
- Released: Early 2002
- Genre: Dance-punk
- Label: Three One G
- Producers: Chris Hathwell, Blake Miller, Johan Bogeli

Moving Units chronology
Moving Units EP (2002)	Dangerous Dreams (2004)

Professional ratings
Review scores
Source	Rating
Allmusic	link

Moving Units is the first release by the band of the same name, Moving Units. It was first released early 2002 on Festival Of Dead Deer's former label, Three One G, in 12" vinyl; the first pressing was on pink vinyl and the second on green. After the band moved to Palm Records, it was reissued on February 4, 2003, on CD.

== Track listing ==
1. "Between Us & Them"
2. "X and Y"
3. "I Am"
4. "Melodrama"
