= Ft. Frank Turner =

Single by The Armed
- Released: June 5, 2019
- Genre: Hardcore punk, metalcore, screamo
- Length: 1:28
- Label: Sargent House, Williams Street
- Producer: Kurt Ballou

The Armed singles chronology
"Luxury Themes" (2018)	"Ft. Frank Turner" (2019)	"All Futures" (2021)

"Ft. Frank Turner" is a non-album single by the American hardcore band The Armed featuring archived vocal tracks of folk punk musician Frank Turner. The song was posted online for streaming exclusively at Adult Swim on June 5, 2019 as a part of Williams Street Records' Adult Swim Singles series. The following day, the song was made available on most major digital streaming sites through Sargent House. The Armed announced they had signed with the label coinciding with the release of "Ft. Frank Turner". Turner claims he did not authorize use of his vocal tracks for the song and was surprised by the release. The single's cover art features Frank Carter of Gallows, Pure Love and Frank Carter & The Rattlesnakes.

== Unauthorized vocal samples ==
As the song's title suggests, "Ft. Frank Turner" features vocals from English folk punk musician Frank Turner. Early news reports about the song's release erroneously reported Turner was not present on the track. However, later that day, Turner posted to his social media accounts that he recognized his vocal tracks as originating from an unused and unfinished demo from a recording session with Kurt Ballou from eight years prior, and he did not authorize use of the tracks for "Ft. Frank Turner". In a tongue-in-cheek Facebook post announcing the new single, The Armed acknowledged the song was "riddled with uncleared samples." About the unauthorized vocal tracks, Turner said, "I was not at any point aware this was happening, don't know the band personally (though I am a casual fan), and didn't clear this." Concluding Turner's Twitter thread, he said that he had reached out to all parties involved in the creation and release of the single, but none of them were responding to his inquiries.

The band's media representatives have given differing responses to journalists' requests for comment regarding the controversy. When Pitchfork reached out, their reps pointed the publication to the American photographer and appropriation artist Sherrie Levine. When Stereogum reached out, The Armed trolled the publication by pretending to confuse Frank Turner with Frank Carter. The band replied, "It saddens us to hear that he's upset about the song. We've been big fans of Gallows for a long time."

== Music video ==
The music video for "Ft. Frank Turner" was directed by Tony Wolski and co-produced by Joe Gall. The video's story centers around a convenience store clerk wearing a ghillie suit who is trying to close up shop, but can't because of two loitering customers. He ditches his post at the store to go skateboarding, but his friend (who is also wearing a ghillie suit) is struck in a hit-and-run accident. At 3:20 in duration, the video is a full two minutes longer than the audio track.
