= Hexes for Exes =

Hexes For Exes

Studio album by Moving Units
- Released: October 9, 2007
- Genre: Alternative dance
- Length: 40:37
- Label: Metropolis Records

Moving Units chronology
Dangerous Dreams (2004)	Hexes For Exes (2007)	Tension War (2011)

Professional ratings
Review scores
Source	Rating
AllMusic	3/5 stars
Pitchfork	5.2/10
Drowned in Sound	7/10
PopMatters	6/10

Hexes For Exes is a 2007 album by Moving Units, their third release. Rough demos of the tracks "Paper Hearts", "Dark Walls", and "Pick Up the Phone" were available on the band's Myspace as early as 2006. The album involves more electronica than their previous releases, with many tracks utilizing programmed beats and synthesizers.

== Track listing ==
1. "Pink Thoughts" - 4:21
2. "Crash 'n' Burn Victims" - 3:30
3. "Paper Hearts" - 3:22
4. "The Kids from Orange County" - 4:07
5. "Dark Walls" - 4:02
6. "Pick Up the Phone" - 2:54
7. "Nail It to the Cross" - 3:42
8. "Wrong Again" - 3:11
9. "Kings and Queens of Nothing" - 4:19
10. "Hearts Departed" - 3:31
11. "Blood Beats" - 3:34
