= Yuk Foo =

Single by Wolf Alice

from the album Visions of a Life
- Released: 12 June 2017
- Genre: Punk rock
- Length: 2:14
- Label: Dirty Hit
- Songwriters: Ellen Rowsell; Jonathan Oddie; Joel Amey; Theodore Ellis
- Producer: Justin Meldal-Johnsen

Wolf Alice singles chronology
"Lisbon" (2016)	"Yuk Foo" (2017)	"Don't Delete the Kisses" (2017)

Music video
- "Yuk Foo" on YouTube

"Yuk Foo" is a song by English alternative rock band Wolf Alice from their second studio album Visions of a Life. It was released on 12 June 2017 through Dirty Hit as the album's lead single.

== Background and release ==
In May 2017, the band started teasing their return by sending fans on their mailing list cryptic postcards with lyrics and song titles, including "Yuk Foo", which they later posted themselves on their Twitter account. A few days later, posters for "Yuk Foo" with a 12 June release date were spotted by fans in London. The band has later confirmed that it was their new single and that it would be premiered by Annie Mac on BBC Radio 1 on that date. After its premiere, the song was released to streaming services and digital retailers. The band had performed the song previously on 8 April 2016 in Columbus, Ohio as part of their US tour in support of their debut album, My Love Is Cool. Fan-shot videos of the performance were uploaded to YouTube before being removed for copyrights violation.

In an interview with The Fader, Rowsell stated: "I was on tour, and I'd been on tour for about one thousand years at that point. I was in Columbus, Ohio or somewhere. I wrote it really quickly, and I didn't refine it. It was this outpour of emotion. I was in my dressing room — we were playing on this radio show, and there were lots of bands [in surrounding rooms]. I didn't want anyone to hear me shouting, so I was shouting like a mouse into the microphone. Foals were in the dressing room next to me, and I was thinking, I wonder if they can hear me screaming "I wanna fuck all the people I meet"? I must have had so much rage inside me, and it just came out. I'd just read that book, Our Band Could Be Your Life, about American hardcore, and I really wanted to make a three-minute, angry song. A lot of it is about expectations of me — as someone's girlfriend, as someone's friend, as someone in a band, as someone with a platform, as a woman. [...] Normally I would cross out the line ["I wanna fuck all the people I meet"]; I would have kept that to myself. But the performance and the lyrics and how abrasive they are — that was my point. I wasn't swearing because I think it's cool, or because I couldn't think of anything to say. I was doing it because that's what you do when you're angry, you curse and scream. People are going to be like, "What do you mean, you want to fuck all your friends?" But it's like, you don't [say to] a director of a movie, "It's so awkward that you wrote a film about murdering prostitutes." It's made up!"

== Critical reception ==
NME writer Jamie Milton said the song is "an enraged, viciously snarling return, so fury-filled it's capable of leaving you physically shaken," while praising Rowsell's delivery, saying: "Across just two minutes, she howls, grunts and cackles between words. The last thing you hear is a piercing wail, like she's screaming directly into a loudspeaker placed next to your ear. 'Yuk Foo' packs rage and angst like sardines in a box, crushed together into a bullet-shaped attack. It's the sound of Wolf Alice making a serious step up." Similarly, Dork magazine stated that "Ellie Rowsell is growling, screaming even, her voice straining at the edges as it rips itself apart – equal parts unrelenting attitude and red hot fury. The spite is as good as another instrument as she calls out the world in increasingly vicious terms," saying that the song is "the all the sass of a militant wing of the Spice Girls inducted into a Nine Inch Nails inspired death cult. Its eyes are set firm, its grin unnervingly fixed. It's absolutely fucking glorious."

Clash said the song is "the most willfully non-commercial, daring, addictive, and downright genius comeback single from a band we've heard in some time." DIY praised the band, saying the song is "piercing, prescient and precocious as fuck - in its short length 'Yuk Foo' encapsulates pretty much everything that's great about Wolf Alice, and maybe even music itself. The best band of the decade just - incredulously - stepped it up. Under the Radar and The Guardian both awarded it as the best track of the week, with the latter publication saying: "Wolf Alice have spat out the most amusingly petulant hate song since Ugly Kid Joe. "Yuk Foo" is a thrilling, two-minute surge of self-indulgent punk fury that's swearier than a Tory aide on election night."

== Music video ==
The song's accompanying music video was released on the band's Vevo channel on YouTube on 27 July 2017. The video was filmed in a day in Shoreditch Town Hall by Adam Powell. The video has been described by DIY as "as dark and dingy as the track itself." In an interview with Dazed, lead vocalist Ellie Rowsell said "because the song's so fast, heavy and brash, it doesn't really seem to lend itself to a narrative video. One of the reasons we took "Yuk Foo" to the studio – besides liking it as a song in and of itself – was because we were so excited to play it live. It's got so much energy, and so we wanted to make a live video to match; short, and manically fast-paced."
