= Dangerous Dreams =

Studio album by Moving Units
- Released: October 12, 2004
- Studio: Indigo Ranch Studios (Malibu, California)
- Genre: Electronic
- Length: 42:46
- Label: Palm
- Producer: Blake Miller; Chris Hathwell; Mickey Petralia

Moving Units chronology
Moving Units EP (2002)	Dangerous Dreams (2004)	Hexes For Exes (2007)

Professional ratings
Aggregate scores
Source	Rating
Metacritic	53/100
Review scores
Source	Rating
AllMusic	2.5/5 stars
Alternative Press	4/5 stars
DIY	4/5 stars
Gigwise	4/5 stars
NME	6/10
Pitchfork	5.8/10
PopMatters	3/10
Q	3.5/5 stars
Rolling Stone	3/5 stars
Uncut	4/10

Dangerous Dreams is the debut studio album by American dance-punk band Moving Units. It was released on October 12, 2004, by Palm Records. It was their second release, after their 2002 Moving Units EP.

The track "Between Us & Them" was used in Leo Romero's opening part in Foundation's skateboarding video That's Life. The track "Going for Adds" was used in a 2007 commercial for Secret Anti-Perspirant Deodorant.

== Critical reception ==
Dangerous Dreams was met with "mixed or average" reviews from critics. At Metacritic, which assigns a weighted average rating out of 100 to reviews from mainstream publications, this release received an average score of 53 based on 12 reviews.

In a review for AllMusic, critic reviewer Heather Phares wrote: "Dangerous Dreams mix of uptight rhythms, angular guitars, and shouty, faux-Brit vocals doesn't invoke nostalgia for late '70s and early '80s. A case of too little, too late, nothing on Moving Units' full-length debut Dangerous Dreams does anything to disprove the feeling that the dance-punk scene is at best overcrowded and at worst approaching rigor mortis any day now." David Spain of LAS Magazine said: "Dangerous Dreams is a passable album that never achieves greatness, nor does it fail miserably, rather residing with the mundane. Jangled, angular guitars and pungent bass lines meander their way through 12 tracks, laced with British-inspired LA vocals."

Writing for Pitchfork, Sam Ubl explained: "Dangerous Dreams is plagued by a pervasive feeling of been there/done that, and the album ultimately sounds like the same two or three tracks on repeat. Moving Units may not be directly responsible for dance-punk's fustiness, but they can't help but suffer from it."

== Track listing ==
Dangerous Dreams track listing
No.	Title	Length
1.	"Emancipation"	3:06
2.	"Between Us & Them"	3:06
3.	"Available"	4:09
4.	"Going for Adds"	3:02
5.	"Unpersuaded"	2:40
6.	"Anyone"	4:00
7.	"Scars"	5:47
8.	"Submission"	4:21
9.	"Birds of Prey"	3:43
10.	"Bricks & Mortar"	3:34
11.	"Killer/Lover"	2:28
12.	"Turn Away"	2:50

Japanese bonus tracks
No.	Title	Length
13.	"Between Us and Them" (Kid606 remix)
14.	"Available" (Junior Sanchez remix)
15.	"I Am"
16.	"Available" (Music video)

== Personnel ==
Credits adapted from AllMusic.

Moving Units

- Blake Miller – vocals
- Johal Bogeli − bass
- Chris Hathwell – drums

Production

- Chris Hathwell – producer
- Blake Miller – mixing, producer
- Mickey Petralia – engineer, mixing, producer
- Louie Teran – mastering
- Richard Kaplan – engineer
- Colby Buddelmeyer – engineer
- Josh Achziger − engineer
