= Ultrapop =

Studio album by The Armed
- Released: April 16, 2021
- Studios: Electrical Audio; God City Studio; Shitcity Studio; LA Sum
- Genres: Metalcore; post-hardcore; post-punk; experimental pop; noise rock
- Length: 38:47
- Label: Sargent House
- Producers: Dan Greene; Ben Chisholm

The Armed chronology
Only Love (2018)	Ultrapop (2021)	Adult Swim Festival '21 (2022)

Singles from Ultrapop
- 1. "All Futures" Released: February 4, 2021; 2. "Average Death" Released: March 2, 2021; 3. "An Iteration" Released: March 31, 2021

Ultrapop is the fourth studio album from the anonymous post-hardcore collective The Armed, released on April 16, 2021, by Sargent House.

== Background and release ==
Prior to the release of Ultrapop on April 16, 2021, two singles were released. "All Futures", the first single, was released on February 4, and "Average Death" was released on 2 March.

The album was co-produced by Dan Greene and Ben Chisholm, an established collaborator with Chelsea Wolfe. The executive producer was long-time collaborator Kurt Ballou. The album is their first release with the label Sargent House. Talking about Chisholm in an interview with New Noise Magazine, band vocalist/lyricist Cara Drolshagen claimed "he’s a genius who understands the math behind the music, and the opportunity to reconfigure its numbers in new ways, to find different solutions." With Ballou taking on an executive role, Drolshagen noted that he was still heavily involved with the band and "that hasn't changed" with regards to his contributions.

In an interview with Stereogum, band member Adam Vallely revealed that many of the songs on the album had been written during the sessions for their previous album: "We never stop writing, songs from Ultrapop were also written during Only Love. So once the album is done with the studio mixes, we already have demos going. I don’t think it’s been affected that much." However, during the process they decided they wanted to change their approach both with how they presented themselves as a band and how they recorded their tracks: "We have a certain aura of obfuscation about [our] identity, so the idea of doing that physically was really cool, and we wanted to present Ultrapop as big and bombastically superheroic as possible."

== Composition ==
With Ultrapop, the Armed inject "maximalist" experimental pop into their "glitchy and discordant" sound. It also nears noise rock, yielding the band's closest lean toward the genre.

== Critical reception ==
Professional ratings
Aggregate scores
Source	Rating
Metacritic	84/100
Review scores
Source	Rating
AllMusic	4/5 stars
Beats Per Minute	71%
Exclaim!	9/10
Kerrang!	4/5
The Line of Best Fit	8/10
Our Culture Mag	4/5 stars
Paste	8.6/10
Pitchfork	8.2/10
Spectrum Culture	80%

Ultrapop was released to positive critical reception. Metacritic, a review aggregation website that assigns normalised ratings from 1–100, awarded a score of 84, indicating "universal acclaim".

Amongst the positive reviews, AllMusic's James Christopher Monger said "Ultrapop sees the anonymous and anachronistic Detroit-based collective deliver a dizzying 12-song set that pairs glitchy and discordant soundscapes and adenoid-tearing vocals with melodies that run the gamut from apocalyptic to downright majestic." Reviewing the album for Kerrang!, Tim Morton stated that "it’s addictive to see where the record goes next. While most hardcore bands are adamant about getting heavier, The Armed are going poppier and, ultimately, weirder, often in the space of one verse. ... Sure, it’s not something you’re going to dip in and out of on a whim, but when you’re in, you won’t want to leave." At Exclaim!, Chris Bryton declared that "Nothing is ever as it seems with the Armed, and Ultrapop is another piece of their mystique. The band's myth and the unity behind it is something that comes out in the spirit and strength of their music, where every part is as important as the other in order to experience the big picture and its full force. Ultrapop is a beautiful storm, dense, monstrous, vital, and aching to break free."

Writing for Our Culture Mag, Konstantinos Pappis stated that the album "doesn’t so much push the boundaries of pop and heavy music as much as it heats them into vapor, resulting in an album equal parts euphoric and chaotic." In Paste, Ben Salmon felt that "What’s most impressive about ULTRAPOP is not necessarily the killer riffs, the pummeling rhythms or the plentiful melodies, though all of those are consistently thrilling. What’s most impressive is the way this band brings together different, disparate styles in a way that sounds seamless and natural and new, even if others have done it before." Writing for Pitchfork, Evan Minkser claimed that the album "doesn’t hurt that their newfound transparency makes the music feel refreshingly human and relatable. Gains-obsessed beefcakes prodding the tropes and social expectations of heavy music by making an extremely heavy album is the Armed doing what the Armed do best—leading with their performative instincts."

In a slightly more reserved opinion of the album, Tim Sentz at Beats Per Minute wrote that "This music is fast and hard, but there are fewer risks than it might at first seem. Those hoping for the band to push themselves in a new direction are going to be slightly disappointed, while those who have vibed with this collective since day one will likely appreciate ULTRAPOP for what it is – another album by The Armed." Reviewing the album for The Line of Best Fit, Robin Ferris noted that "This definitely isn't for everyone, and the production and mixing is particularly un-inviting this time around. ... But the sheer tunefulness in the songs beneath it all is actually incredibly heartwarming, and something that deserves as much attention from the adventurous indie listener as it currently gets from the rock and metal gatekeeping elite."

=== Accolades ===
Ultrapop on year-end lists
Publication	List	Rank	Ref.
Paste	The 50 Best Albums of 2021	8	
PopMatters	The 20 Best Metal Albums of 2021	2	

== Track listing ==
Ultrapop track listing
No.	Title	Length
1.	"Ultrapop"	2:43
2.	"All Futures"	3:04
3.	"Masunaga Vapors"	2:30
4.	"A Life So Wonderful"	3:07
5.	"An Iteration"	2:53
6.	"Big Shell"	3:17
7.	"Average Death"	4:31
8.	"Faith in Medication"	3:46
9.	"Where Man Knows Want"	2:56
10.	"Real Folk Blues"	3:38
11.	"Bad Selection"	3:44
12.	"The Music Becomes a Skull" (featuring Mark Lanegan)	2:38

== Personnel ==
Ultrapop was performed by The Armed. The following is taken from the LP record release.

Additional musicians

- Urian Hackney
- Mark Lanegan
- Troy Van Leeuwen
- Ben Koller
- Eva Spence
- Trevor Naud
- Andy Pitcher
- Nicole Estill
- Brian Wolski
- Kurt Ballou
- Ben Chisholm
- Zach Weeks
- Adam Vallely

Production

- Kurt Ballou – executive producer
- Dan Greene – co-producer and co-engineer
- Ben Chisholm – co-producer and co-engineer
- Zach Weeks – mixing and assistant engineer
- Taylor Hales – assistant engineer
- Mikhail Marinas – additional engineer

Design

- The Armed
- Priscilla Call
