= Untitled (The Armed album) =

Studio album by the Armed
- Released: June 23, 2015
- Studio: GodCity
- Length: 41:08
- Producer: Kurt Ballou

The Armed chronology
These Are Lights (2009)	Untitled (2015)	Only Love (2018)

Untitled is the second full-length album by American hardcore punk band the Armed. It was released June 23, 2015 for free via Bandcamp. The album cover is a play on the cover of Aladdin Sane by David Bowie. It features drummer Nick Yasyshyn (Sumac, Baptists) and was recorded and produced by Kurt Ballou at GodCity studio.

== Reception ==
Professional ratings
Review scores
Source	Rating
Pitchfork Media	6.8/10
Angry Metal Guy	4.5/5 stars

== Track listing ==
All lyrics are written by The Armed; all music is composed by The Armed.

No.	Title	Length
1.	"Future Drugs"	1:36
2.	"Forever Scum"	2:17
3.	"Nervewrecker"	2:54
4.	"Rhythm 0"	3:09
5.	"Enemies Closer"	2:23
6.	"Blessings"	3:30
7.	"Dead Actress"	3:55
8.	"Polarizer"	3:47
9.	"Ender"	3:57
10.	"No Risk"	2:06
11.	"Issachar"	3:31
12.	"Paradise Day"	2:58
13.	"Rage of Youth"	3:09
14.	"Dead Artist"	1:56
Total length:		41:08
