= The Future Is Here and Everything Needs to Be Destroyed =

2025 album by The Armed

Studio album by the Armed
- Released: August 1, 2025
- Genre: Post-hardcore
- Length: 32:16
- Label: Sargent House
- Producers: The Armed; Ben Chisholm

The Armed chronology
Perfect Saviors (2023)	The Future Is Here and Everything Needs to Be Destroyed (2025)

Singles from The Future Is Here and Everything Needs to Be Destroyed
- 1. "Well Made Play" Released: May 21, 2025; 2. "Kingbreaker" Released: June 18, 2025; 3. "Sharp Teeth" Released: July 16, 2025

The Future Is Here and Everything Needs to Be Destroyed is the sixth studio album by American hardcore punk musical collective the Armed. It was released on August 1, 2025 via Sargent House.

== Background ==
The album, centering on the theme of Weltschmerz, was described by the band's singer Tony Wolski as "music for a statistically wealthy population that somehow can't afford food or medicine—endlessly scrolling past vacation photos, gym selfies, and images of child amputees in the same feed." It features collaborators including Converge guitarist Kurt Ballou, Queens of the Stone Age guitarist Troy Van Leeuwen, and bassist Justin Meldal-Johnsen.

Preceded by the band's 2023 fifth album, Perfect Saviors, The Future was announced in May 2025, alongside the release of its first single "Well Made Play" on May 21, 2025, with a music video directed by Christopher Gruse. "Kingbreaker" was released as the second single on June 18, 2025, alongside a music video directed by Wolski and Aaron Jones. It was followed by "Sharp Teeth", the album's third single, on July 16, 2025.

== Reception ==
Professional ratings
Review scores
Source	Rating
AllMusic	4/5 stars
Beats Per Minute	69%
Kerrang!	4/5 stars
The Line of Best Fit	9/10
Pitchfork	7.8/10
Stereoboard	4/5 stars

The Future received a four-star rating from AllMusic, whose reviewer Fred Thomas commented that "the Armed gleefully close the door on whatever shreds of accessibility they dallied with on their last few albums before it, but this unrelenting barrage of excitement and glorious confusion is a welcome replacement." Jeremy Allen of The Quietus remarked that the album "scans like the angry offspring of Jenny Holzer and The Pop Group, a statement album title that doesn't hold back", calling it "formidable".

Stereogum described the album as "an album born from anger and frustration about the state of a world that has careened into dystopia on seemingly every front" and "the kind of album where you never know what kind of madness is about to materialize." Flood Magazine referred to it as the "most literal Armed album to date", calling it "as sequentially consistent as its predecessor was scattershot." Kerrang! assigned the album a rating of four out of five, calling it "a thrillingly unsubtle response" and "faster and more furious, glitchier and less easily digestible" in comparison to its predecessor. It was given a nine out of ten rating by British magazine The Line of Best Fit, which stated that the album's "unrelenting refusal to quit, like The Armed, makes it a sonic treat and proves the Detroit gang remain unstoppable."

Maddy Howell of Stereoboard gave the album four-star rating, calling it "an album that toys with the idea of attempting to fix things but ultimately decides we’re better off just watching it all burn." Alex Robert Ross, writing for Pitchfork, noted the album was "built around a barrage of blast beats, dissonant guitars, and feral vocal outbursts" and stated it was "billed as a spasmodic response to dehumanization and disaster." The publication rated the album 7.8 out of ten. John Amen of Beats Per Minute had a more mixed take on the album, writing, "The set highlights the band’s multifacetedness, offering moments of transcendent rage, but also feels cumulatively scattered, lacking an emotional axis or sense of sonic continuity".

== Track listing ==
All tracks are written by Kenneth Szymanski and Tony Wolski.

The Future Is Here and Everything Needs to Be Destroyed track listing
No.	Title	Length
1.	"Well Made Play"	2:13
2.	"Purity Drag"	3:28
3.	"Kingbreaker"	1:59
4.	"Grace Obscure"	3:14
5.	"Broken Mirror" (featuring Prostitute)	2:31
6.	"Sharp Teeth"	2:34
7.	"I Steal What I Want"	2:06
8.	"Local Millionaire"	3:37
9.	"Gave Up"	2:15
10.	"Heathen"	5:38
11.	"A More Perfect Design"	2:41
12.	"TELAMOR" (hidden track on vinyl)	2:50
Total length:		35:06
