= The Active Set =

American rock band

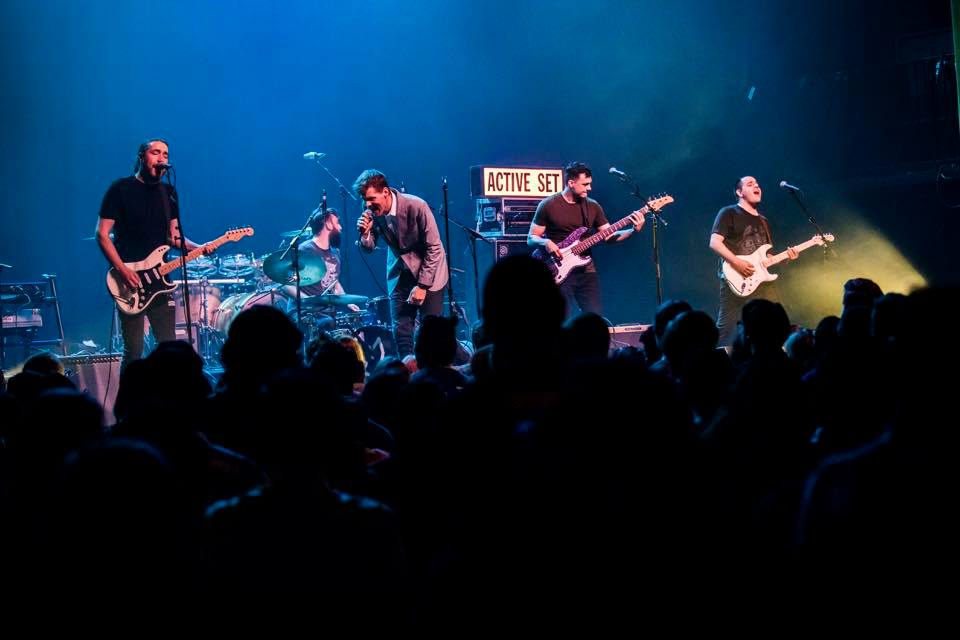
- The Active Set live at the Fonda Theatre in 2019

Background information
- Origin: Los Angeles, California, United States
- Genres: Alternative; Indie rock; Indie pop; new wave; pop rock
- Years active: 2006–present
- Members: Matthew Stolarz; Alen Racedo; Jason Friday
- Website: www.theactiveset.com

The Active Set is an indie/alternative rock band from Los Angeles, California formed in 2006. The band consists of Matthew Stolarz (lead vocals, guitar), Alen Racedo (bass) and Jason Friday (guitar).

== History ==
The Active Set was formed after Matthew Stolarz departed his position as bassist for punk rock band The Briggs. Unsuccessful with his first attempt at putting a band together, he recorded the first Active Set EP at Aermotor Studios in Sunland, CA with producer Jason LaRocca. Shortly thereafter he assembled a band and began playing live and toured regionally, including trips to SXSW.

Over 2010–2011 three singles, "Let The Games Begin" "It Multiplies" and "Famous For Dying" were released digitally (with accompanying videos) as the band continued playing regularly and tracking their first album. 11 was released in late 2011 on Chisel Pixel Records to favorable reviews, including the L.A. Times and Buzzbands L.A. The song "Better Brigade" was featured in Season 3 of Royal Pains on the USA Network.

The band toured regionally in early 2012, including another trip to SXSW and several weeks in the East Coast/Midwest, opening for Neon Trees and Awolnation. In December 2012 alt-rock radio station KROQ launched the video for a charity-driven Christmas single by the band.

In July 2013 the band played a fundraising concert at Vista Murrieta High School with Neon Trees that raised funds for various school programs. The event was documented in the "Run" concert video. In August the band played the Sunset Strip Music Festival with other acts such as Linkin Park, Awolnation, Black Rebel Motorcycle Club and others and was named one of the "Top 5 Bands" at the festival by LA Music Blog. The band followed this with two regional tours.

The first new single "Shut 'Em Down" was released online in July 2014, and spent ten weeks in rotation on KROQ Locals Only. .

The 7-song second album Lights was released January 22.

In August 2015 the band supported Bloc Party on two sold-out club shows leading up to their appearance at FYF Fest in Los Angeles.

The band spent much of 2016 mostly writing and playing select shows, including opening for Eve 6 on their 2016 tour. They released their third EP Everything Changes on November 18 and played a headlining release show at the Satellite in Silverlake.

In 2017, the band took a hiatus from live shows to work on new music and explore other creative endeavors, but played the New Professor Records showcase at Echo Park Rising, as well as some Sofar Sounds acoustic performances.

2018 was spent mostly writing songs for a new record, but on October 22, 2018, the band released a music video for "Let's Go Out Tonight".

In 2019 the band recorded the first third of their new record at Sunset Sound Recorders and La-Rocc-A-Fella Studios, opened for Mae and Matt Thiessen, and also did a short run of shows supporting White Lies on the West Coast.

In 2020, the band was forced to cancel all tour plans due to the COVID-19 lockdown, and on May 11 released "Difficulties", the first single from their new album.

== Discography ==
=== Studio albums ===
Year	Album
2015	Lights
2011	11

=== EPs ===
Year	EP
2016	Everything Changes
2008	The Active Set

=== Singles ===
Year	Single
2020	Difficulties
2016	Say Goodbye
2016	Let's Go Out Tonight
2014	Shut 'Em Down
2012	Making Out (Is the Best Part of Christmas)
2011	Famous For Dying
2011	It Multiplies
2010	Let The Games Begin

=== Music Videos ===
Year	Video	Director
2026	Bullets	Robyn August
2026	Death Of A Friend	Robyn August
2018	Let's Go Out Tonight	Joshua Gitersonke, Matthew Stolarz
2014	Shut 'Em Down	Lior Molcho
2013	Run (at Vista Murrieta High School)	Lior Molcho
2012	Making Out (is the Best Part of Christmas)	Lior Molcho
2011	Famous For Dying	Lior Molcho
2011	It Multiplies	Lior Molcho
2010	Let The Games Begin	Lior Molcho
