= Justin Meldal-Johnsen =

American musician and producer (born 1970)

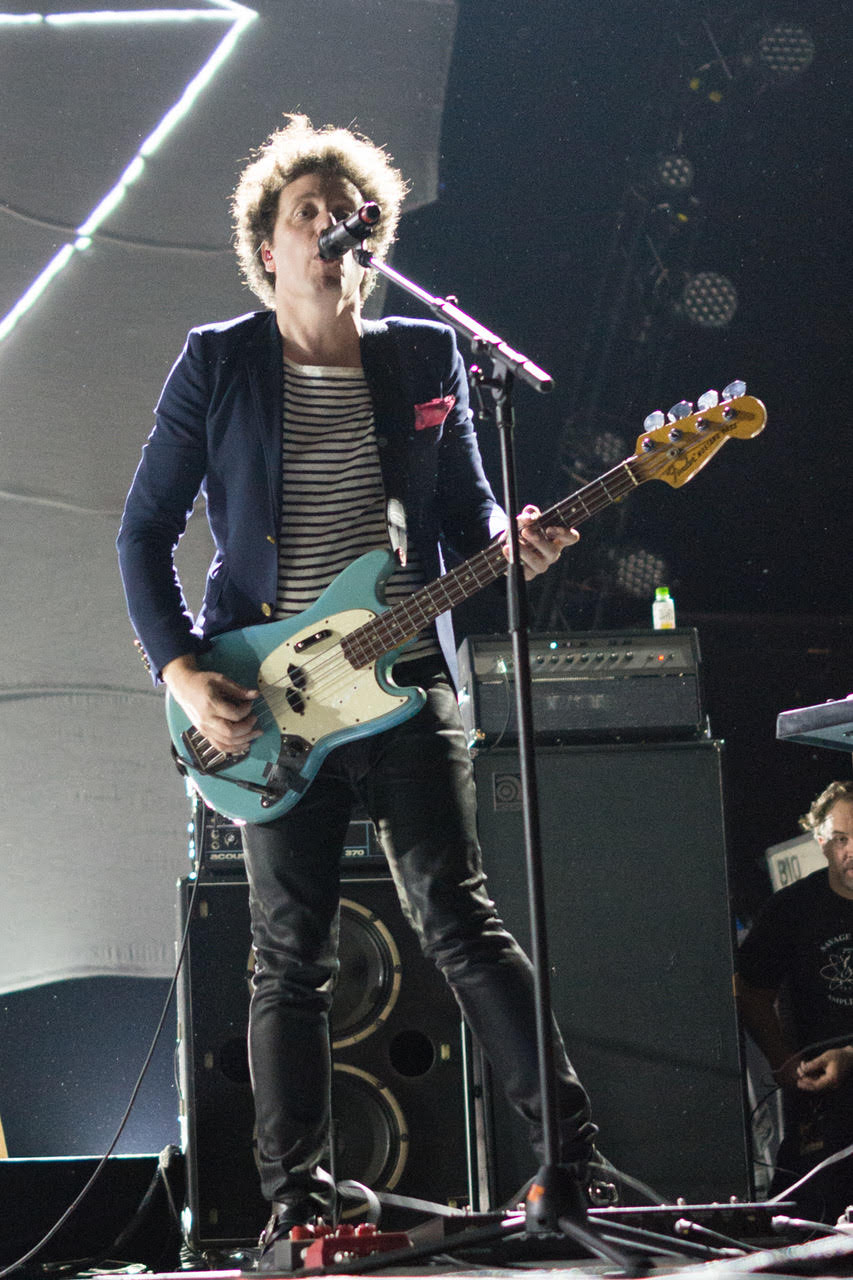
- Justin Meldal-Johnsen performing with Beck at Hammerstein Ballroom in New York City on June 30, 2014

Background information
- Born: March 26, 1970 (age 56); Eugene, Oregon, United States
- Genres: Alternative rock; industrial rock
- Occupations: Musician; songwriter; record producer
- Instruments: Bass; double bass; guitar; keyboards; synthesizer; glockenspiel; clarinet; mandolin; percussion; cello; vocals
- Formerly of: Nine Inch Nails
- Website: justinmeldaljohnsen.com

Justin Meldal-Johnsen (born March 26, 1970) is an American record producer, musician, songwriter and musical director. He is best known for his work with artists such as Beck, Nine Inch Nails, M83, Air, St. Vincent, Wolf Alice, and Deafheaven.

Meldal-Johnsen served as the touring bassist, guitarist, and keyboardist for Nine Inch Nails in 2008 and 2009, and was Beck's bassist and musical director from 1996 until mid-2016. In 2021, he began work as a bassist, keyboardist and musical director for St. Vincent, and in 2023 resumed occasional touring with Beck.

Other artists Meldal-Johnsen has worked with include Garbage, The Mars Volta, Frank Ocean, Dixie Chicks, Tori Amos, Charlotte Martin, Dido, Charlotte Gainsbourg, Goldfrapp, Blood Orange, Pete Yorn, Turin Brakes, Marianne Faithfull and Ladytron. As a producer, Meldal-Johnsen has worked with M83, Paramore, Metric, Tegan and Sara, Deafheaven, Poppy, Jimmy Eat World, The Naked and Famous, School of Seven Bells, Neon Trees, Young the Giant, Ken Andrews, Division Day, and more.

== Musician career and history ==
Meldal-Johnsen grew up in Los Angeles, obsessively listening to his parents' records and taking up bass guitar at age of twelve. Like most budding musicians, he spent his time playing along to his favorite bands' records and jamming in garages. His interests were wide, but centered on American post-punk (Hüsker Dü, Fugazi, The Minutemen, Sonic Youth) and UK post-punk, goth, and dream pop (Wire, Cocteau Twins, Gang of Four, Love and Rockets, Bauhaus, New Order, Joy Division). After high school at the age of seventeen, he worked the night shift as a janitor at Cherokee Recording Studios in Hollywood, looking in on late-night sessions, and occasionally invited to witness the proceedings.

In 1987 he met Beck, and the two would form a lasting friendship and shared musical interests that would eventually culminate in Justin joining Beck's touring band many years later. From 1988 to 1993, Meldal-Johnsen was in LA alternative rock bands Last Carousel and This Great Religion, with Tony Hoffer. In 1994, he joined the band Pet, which featured singer Lisa Papineau and guitarist Tyler Bates. Also in 1994, Meldal-Johnsen joined Los Angeles alt-noise band Medicine with Brad Laner, and recorded and toured with them until their eventual break-up in 1996. Laner and Meldal-Johnsen would continue to record and work together on projects such as Electric Company as well as Laner's various solo albums in years to come.

In early 1996, Beck asked Meldal-Johnsen to join his touring and recording band, which he was a member of from 1996 until leaving in May 2016, an announcement which was made during Beck's set at the Beale Street Music Festival during band introductions in a poignant send-off. He recorded with Beck on albums such as Odelay, Mutations, Midnite Vultures, Sea Change, Guero, The Information, Morning Phase, as well as a great quantity of hitherto unreleased material.

In 1998, he joined up with French band Air for their Moon Safari tour, followed by the recording of their 2001 album 10 000 Hz Legend. In 2002, he helped to form the band Ima Robot, and On September 6, 2003, Ima Robot released their first full-length album, the self-titled Ima Robot. The album featured the singles "Dynomite" and "Song #1" (released in the UK only), and the band supported their album by touring worldwide with artists such as Hot Hot Heat, The Von Bondies, Jane's Addiction, The Sounds, and others. In 2006, he briefly joined Gnarls Barkley, acting as the musical director and assembling the touring band. He was involved in just two performances before re-joining with Beck: The Coachella Festival and a secret show at The Roxy in Hollywood.

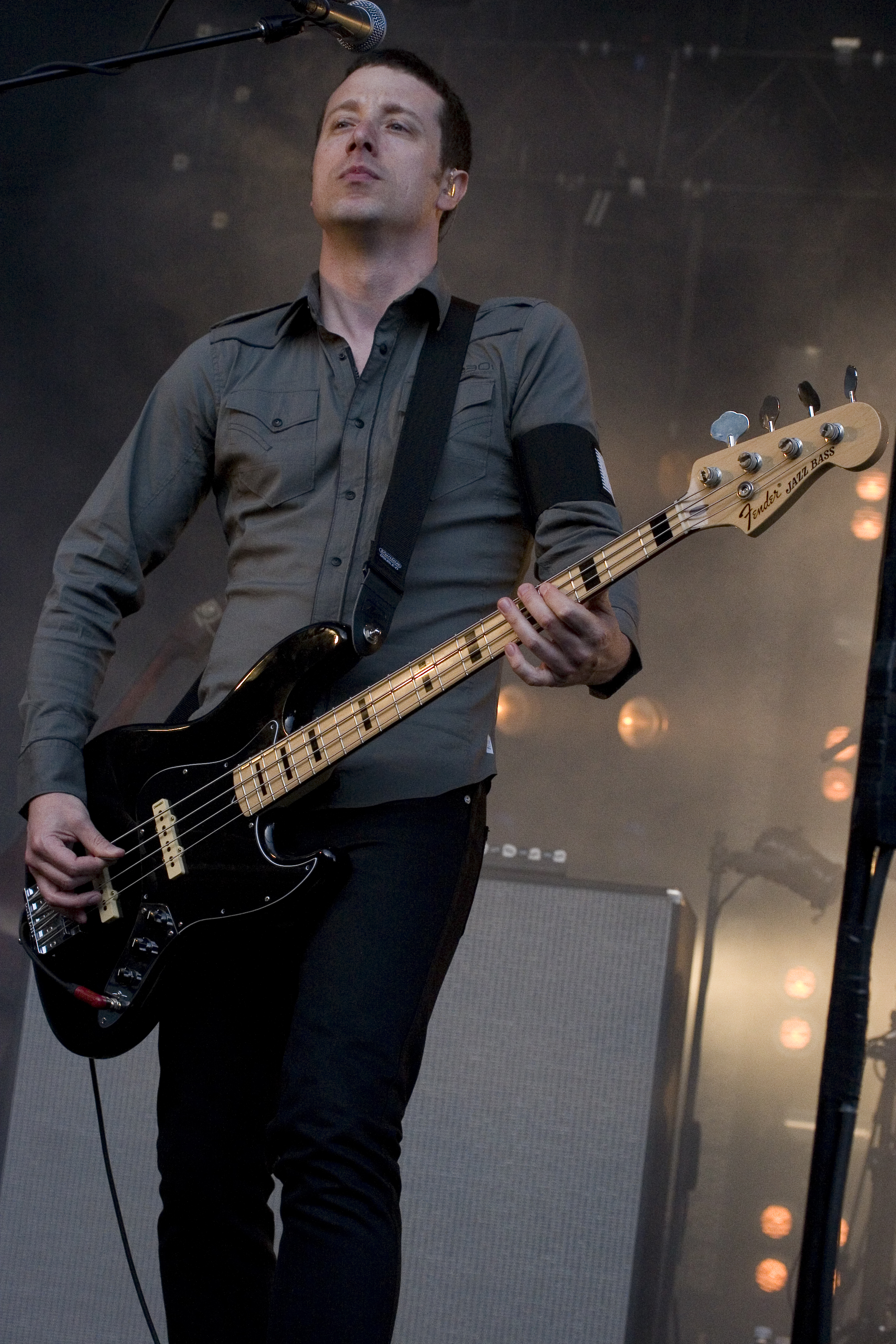
Meldal-Johnsen performing with Nine Inch Nails in 2009.

In 2008, Meldal-Johnsen met with Trent Reznor and was invited to join the Nine Inch Nails touring band as bassist, guitarist, and keyboard player. Meldal-Johnsen spent the majority of 2008 to 2009 in Nine Inch Nails on their Lights in the Sky (2008), and NIN|JA / Wave Goodbye (2009) tours. In 2010, Beck asked Meldal-Johnsen back into the studio to contribute to a large body of work to be divided amongst multiple eventual releases. During the 2010s he also toured with Beck, but mainly focused on producing. In 2017, he was honored by the Fender Musical Instrument Corporation with the worldwide release his own signature instrument, the JMJ Road Worn Mustang Bass. In 2021 he returned to performing in a new role as bassist, musical director, and synth player with St. Vincent, starting off with a performance on Saturday Night Live and the subsequent world tour. In the summer of 2023, he reunited with Beck and several other original band members for a North American tour.

== Producing career ==
Beginning in about 2005, Meldal-Johnsen thought that he may be able to parlay his extensive studio experience as a musician into the field of producing and engineering, something he had always had interest in. His first forays were exclusively co-productions, but beginning in 2009, he began to move forward as a full-fledged producer/co-writer/collaborator. This is seen most clearly with his production and writing on the acclaimed 2011 M83 album, Hurry Up, We're Dreaming. Today, Meldal-Johnsen spends most of his time producing and writing, working largely from his studio in Glendale, California.

In 2013, he produced Paramore's self-titled fourth album, and Young the Giant's album Mind Over Matter. As of Fall 2014, Meldal-Johnsen has worked with The Naked and Famous, School of Seven Bells, The Raveonettes, Metric and others in between tours with Beck. He produced Wolf Alice's sophomore album, Visions of a Life which won the Mercury Prize in 2018.

== Credits ==
=== Production ===
- 2026 Yard Act – You're Gonna Need a Little Music
- 2025 Spoon – Chateau Blues (single)
- 2025 Spoon – Guess I'm Fallin In Love (single)
- 2025 The Armed – The Future Is Here and Everything Needs to Be Destroyed – Additional Production
- 2025 Deafheaven – Lonely People with Power
- 2024 St. Vincent – All Born Screaming - Additional Production
- 2024 Allie X – Weird World - Additional Production
- 2023 M83 – Fantasy
- 2023 The Armed – Perfect Saviors – Co-Production
- 2022 Jimmy Eat World – Place Your Debts (single)
- 2022 Jimmy Eat World – Something Loud (single)
- 2022 Poppy – Pocket – song from the Stagger (EP)
- 2021 Poppy – Flux
- 2021 Deafheaven – Infinite Granite
- 2020 Best Coast – Always Tomorrow
- 2020 Liza Anne – Desire (single)
- 2019 Jimmy Eat World – Surviving
- 2019 M83 – DSVII
- 2019 Liza Anne – Devotion (single)
- 2018 Metric – Art of Doubt
- 2017 Wolf Alice – Visions of a Life
- 2017 Paramore – After Laughter
- 2016 Jimmy Eat World – Integrity Blues
- 2016 M83 – Junk
- 2016 The Black Queen – Fever Daydream
- 2016 School of Seven Bells – SVIIB
- 2015 Yacht – I Thought the Future Would Be Cooler
- 2014 The Raveonettes – Pe'ahi
- 2014 Young the Giant – Mind over Matter
- 2013 Paramore – Paramore
- 2013 Tegan and Sara – Heartthrob
- 2012 Frankenweenie Unleashed! (Original Motion Picture Soundtrack)
- 2012 Jamie Drastik - September
- 2011 Neon Trees – Picture Show
- 2011 M83 – Hurry Up, We're Dreaming
- 2011 Moving Units – Tension War (EP)
- 2009 Division Day – Visitation
- 2008 The Informers – contributions to the score and Original Motion Picture Soundtrack
- 2007 Ken Andrews – Secrets of the Lost Satellite
- 2006 Holly Palmer – Songs for Tuesday

=== Songwriting ===
- 2023 M83 – Fantasy
- 2023 The Armed – Perfect Saviors
- 2022 Poppy – Pocket – song from the Stagger (EP)
- 2021 Poppy – Flux
- 2018 Metric – Art of Doubt
- 2016 M83 – Junk
- 2016 School of Seven Bells – SVIIB
- 2013 Paramore – Paramore
- 2011 M83 – Hurry Up, We're Dreaming
- 2010 The Switch – movie score
- 2008 The Informers – contributions to the score and Original Motion Picture Soundtrack
- 2007 Macy Gray – Big
- 2003 Macy Gray – The Trouble with Being Myself

=== Mixing ===
- 2023 The Active Set – The Great Pretender (single)
- 2023 The Active Set – In Between Lovers (single)
- 2022 Jimmy Eat World – Place Your Debts (single)
- 2022 Jimmy Eat World – Something Loud (single)
- 2018 Preoccupations – New Material (album)

=== Musician ===
- 2026 Chelsea Wolfe – The Dark (Chelsea Wolfe album)
- 2024 St. Vincent – All Born Screaming
- 2024 Allie X – Weird World
- 2023 Drab Majesty – An Object In Motion EP
- 2023 The Armed – Perfect Saviors
- 2023 Beck - Thinking About You (single)
- 2021 Deafheaven – Infinite Granite
- 2021 Garbage – No Gods No Masters
- 2020 Best Coast – Always Tomorrow
- 2020 Dixie Chicks – Gaslighter
- 2019 Drab Majesty – Modern Mirror
- 2019 M83 – DSVII
- 2019 Jimmy Eat World – Surviving
- 2019 Mike Patton & Jean-Claude Vannier – Corpse Flower
- 2019 The Bird and the Bee – Interpreting The Masters Volume 2: A Tribute to Van Halen
- 2018 Preoccupations – New Material
- 2017 Paramore – After Laughter
- 2017 Lawrence Rothman – The Book of Law
- 2016 M83 – Junk
- 2016 School of Seven Bells – SVIIB
- 2016 Edward Sharpe and the Magnetic Zeros – PersonA
- 2016 Air – Twentyears
- 2015 Frank Black – The Complete Recordings
- 2014 Young the Giant – Mind Over Matter
- 2014 Beck – Morning Phase
- 2013 Paramore – Paramore
- 2013 Drake – Nothing Was the Same
- 2013 Tegan and Sara – Heartthrob
- 2013 Classixx – Hanging Gardens
- 2013 Keaton Henson – Birthdays
- 2012 Frankenweenie Unleashed!
- 2012 Neon Trees – Picture Show
- 2012 Garbage – Not Your Kind of People
- 2012 Jason Mraz – Love Is a Four Letter Word
- 2011 M83 – Hurry Up, We're Dreaming
- 2011 Cass McCombs – Wit's End
- 2011 Serge Gainsbourg – Tribute at The Hollywood Bowl
- 2011 Blood Orange – Coastal Grooves
- 2011 Various Artists – Sucker Punch Soundtrack
- 2010 Adam Stevens – We Live on Cliffs
- 2010 Macy Gray – The Sellout
- 2010 Kid Rock – Born Free
- 2010 Sara Bareilles – Kaleidoscope Heart
- 2010 Pete Francis Heimbold – Movie We Are In
- 2010 Sons of Sylvia – Revelation
- 2010 Charlotte Gainsbourg – IRM
- 2009 Cory Chisel and The Wandering Sons – Death Won't Send A Letter
- 2009 Division Day – Visitation
- 2009 Pink – P!nk Box
- 2009 Christopher Young – The Informers Soundtrack
- 2008 Nine Inch Nails – The Slip (live rehearsal footage on the DVD content only; did not record the actual album)
- 2008 Daniel Martin Moore – Stray Age
- 2008 Goldfrapp – Seventh Tree
- 2008 Ladytron – Velocifero
- 2008 Dido – Safe Trip Home
- 2008 Jacob Abello – Nothing But Gold
- 2008 Beck – Odelay (Deluxe Edition)
- 2007 Emmylou Harris – Songbird: Rare Tracks and Forgotten Gems
- 2007 Ken Andrews – Secrets of the Lost Satellite
- 2007 Storm Large – Ladylike Side One
- 2007 They Might Be Giants – The Else
- 2007 Macy Gray – Big
- 2006 Ima Robot – Monument to the Masses
- 2006 Melissa McClelland – Thumbelina's One Night Stand
- 2006 Dixie Chicks – Taking the Long Way
- 2006 Beck – The Information
- 2006 Pink – I'm Not Dead
- 2006 Gran Bel Fisher – Full Moon Cigarette
- 2006 Toby Lightman – Bird on a Wire
- 2005 Charlotte Martin – Veins (EP)
- 2005 Judd and Maggie – Subjects
- 2005 Tom McRae – All Maps Welcome
- 2005 Gemma Hayes – The Roads Don't Love You
- 2005 Beck – Guero
- 2005 Garbage – Bleed Like Me
- 2005 The Black Eyed Peas – Monkey Business
- 2005 Nikka Costa – can'tneverdidnothin'
- 2004 Peter Walker – Landed
- 2004 Charlotte Martin – On Your Shore
- 2005 Rob Thomas – ...Something to Be
- 2004 Courtney Love – America's Sweetheart
- 2003 Jessy Moss – Street Knuckles
- 2003 Lisa Marie Presley – To Whom It May Concern
- 2003 Charlotte Martin – In Parentheses (EP)
- 2003 Michelle Branch – Hotel Paper
- 2003 The Mars Volta – De-Loused in the Comatorium
- 2003 Macy Gray – The Trouble with Being Myself
- 2003 Ima Robot – Ima Robot
- 2003 Turin Brakes – Ether Song
- 2003 Pete Yorn – Day I Forgot
- 2003 Tori Amos – Tales of a Librarian
- 2003 Nelly Furtado – Folklore
- 2002 Linkin Park – "My December"
- 2002 Scapegoat Wax – SWAX
- 2002 Mark Eitzel – Music for Courage and Confidence
- 2002 Brad Mehldau – Largo
- 2002 Ladytron – Light & Magic
- 2002 Beck – Sea Change
- 2002 Mark Eitzel – Music for Courage and Confidence
- 2002 Marianne Faithfull – Kissin Time
- 2002 Air (as Rainbow Brothers) – 818.323.01
- 2002 Tori Amos – Scarlet's Walk
- 2001 Érica Garcia – Amorama
- 2001 Big Sir – Now That's What I Call Big Sir
- 2001 Air – 10 000 Hz Legend
- 2001 Tori Amos – Strange Little Girls
- 2000 Ike Riley – Salesmen and Racists
- 2000 On – Shifting Skin
- 2000 Beck – Midnite Vultures
- 2000 Beck – Farm Aid: Keep America Growing, Vol. 1
- 2000 Logan's Sanctuary – soundtrack album
- 1999 Jude – No One Is Really Beautiful
- 1999 Jamiroquai – "Black Capricorn Day"
- 1999 Beck – More Oar: A Tribute to the Skip Spence Album
- 1999 Beck – Sin City – A Tribute to Gram Parsons
- 1999 Beck – Mixed Bizness
- 1999 Blinker the Star – August Everywhere
- 1998 Amnesia – Lingus
- 1998 Electric Company – Studio City
- 1998 Beck – Mutations
- 1998 Tori Amos – From the Choirgirl Hotel
- 1998 Barbie, Christe and Teresa – Beyond Pink
- 1997 Moby – That's When I Reach for My Revolver
- 1997 Beck – The Little Drum Machine Boy
- 1997 Beck – Electric Music and the Summer People
- 1996 The Elastic Purejoy – The Clutter of Pop
- 1996 Pet – Pet
- 1996 Tori Amos – Hey Jupiter
- 1996 Billy White Acre – Billy's Not Bitter
- 1995 Electric Company – Live in Concert
- 1995 Medicine – Her Highness
- 1993 Circle of Power – Circle of Power

=== Other ===
- The Informers Original Motion Picture Soundtrack (music supervisor, composer)
- Californication – bass guitar during musical score during Seasons 1, 2, 3, and 6, as well as bass guitar on the shows musical theme song, "Hank's Theme".
- The Devil's Rejects – played bass on the score.
- 30 Days of Night – musician on the score.
- Halloween II – played bass on the score.

== Sources ==
- Bass Player October 2008, pp. 26–35, 86
