= Moving Units =

American dance-punk band

- Origin: Los Angeles, California, US
- Genres: Indie rock; post-punk revival; dance-punk
- Years active: 2001–present
- Labels: Palm Pictures, Three One G, Metropolis, Kitty Play Records, Moving Units Recordings, Post Modern Records, Cobra Music
- Members: Blake Miller
- Past members: Chris Hathwell; Johan Bogeli; Victor Velasquez Touring Members; Mike McGill; Mike Delgado; Bidi Cobra; Reade Pryor
- Website: movingunits.com

Moving Units is an American dance-punk band from Los Angeles, California.

== History ==
The band was formed in 2001 by Blake Miller (formerly of Spectacle) Johan Boegli and Chris Hathwell after Miller invited Boegli and Hathwell to jam songs from an early demo he self-produced. They released their debut EP, Moving Units, on Three One G in early 2002. Their touring experience includes opening slots for Hot Hot Heat, Pixies, Blur and Nine Inch Nails. Their debut full-length album, Dangerous Dreams, was released on October 12, 2004, by Palm Pictures.

Moving Units released their second studio album, Hexes for Exes in 2007 on Metropolis Records. The first single, "Pink Thoughts", was released through the band's MySpace page. So Sweet released a one-off limited edition 7 inch vinyl single "Crash N Burn Victims" in the UK coupled with a remix of the same track by Felix Cartal in November 2007.

The band released an EP titled Tension War on February 14, 2011. Moving Units chose to self-release the new EP in conjunction with their management firm, Post Modern. Moving Units also played at Coachella 2011 in support of their latest release.

On March 31, 2012, Moving Units announced via their Facebook page that Blake Miller had left the band by mutual decision.

In late 2012, Blake Miller had performed shows with the band name "Moving Units" without approval of the original members, causing a mild dispute. The issue being resolved later, the original band members reached an agreement where Miller was given permission to use the band's name "Moving Units" with new members and continue the project under the same moniker.

== Discography ==
Albums

- Dangerous Dreams (2004, Palm Pictures)
- Hexes for Exes (2007, Metropolis)
- Neurotic Exotic (2013, Metropolis)
- Damage with Care (2016, Metropolis / Kitty Play)
- A Tribute to Joy Division: Collision With Joy Division (2017, Flowers of Romance)
- This is Six (2018, Metropolis)

EPs

- Moving Units (2002, Palm Pictures)
- Tension War (2011, Moving Units Recordings / Post Modern Records / Cobra Music)

Singles

- "Available" (2003, Palm Pictures)
- "Crash 'n' Burn Victims" (7-inch vinyl) (2007, So Sweet)

== Related links ==
- The Smell
