= Only Love (album) =

Studio album by the Armed
- Released: April 27, 2018
- Studio: GodCity
- Length: 38:23
- Label: No Rest Until Ruin
- Producer: Kurt Ballou

The Armed chronology
Untitled (2015)	Only Love (2018)	Ultrapop (2021)

Professional ratings
Review scores
Source	Rating
Pitchfork	8.1/10
Kill Your Stereo	95/100

Only Love is the third full-length album by American hardcore punk band the Armed. It was released April 27, 2018 for free via Bandcamp. It features drummer Ben Koller and was recorded and produced by Kurt Ballou at GodCity studio.

== Track listing ==
All lyrics are written by The Armed; all music is composed by The Armed.

No.	Title	Length
1.	"Witness"	3:08
2.	"Role Models"	2:52
3.	"Nowhere to be Found"	2:21
4.	"Apperception"	1:50
5.	"Parody Warning"	2:05
6.	"Fortune's Daughter"	3:29
7.	"Luxury Themes"	5:18
8.	"Heavily Lined"	2:27
9.	"Middle Homes"	3:54
10.	"Ultraglass"	3:22
11.	"On Jupiter"	7:37
Total length:		38:23
