= Tension War =

EP by Moving Units
- Released: February 14, 2011
- Genre: Alternative dance
- Label: Paper Garden

Moving Units chronology
| Hexes For Exes (2007) | Tension War (2011) |

Tension War is a 2011 extended play (EP) by Moving Units, their fourth release. The EP includes three brand new songs, one re-interpretation and two new remixes by We Are Enfant Terrible (Last Gang) and Spirituals (Lefse).

== Track listing ==
1. "Liquid X"
2. "Until She Says"
3. "Pink Redemption"
4. "Paris, New Mexico"
5. "Until She Says (We Are Enfant Terrible Remix)"
6. "Until She Says (Spirituals Remix)"
