= Surviving (album) =

Studio album by Jimmy Eat World
- Released: October 18, 2019
- Recorded: 2018–2019
- Studio: Unit 2; Chez JMJ; EastWest
- Genre: Alternative rock; arena rock; emo; pop rock; pop punk
- Length: 36:29
- Label: RCA; Exotic Location
- Producer: Justin Meldal-Johnsen; Jimmy Eat World

Jimmy Eat World chronology
Integrity Blues (2016)	Surviving (2019)	Something(s) Loud (2025)

Singles from Surviving
- 1. "All the Way (Stay)" Released: September 23, 2019

Surviving is the tenth studio album by American rock band Jimmy Eat World. The album was released on October 18, 2019, through RCA and Exotic Location Recordings. After touring in support of Integrity Blues (2016) concluded in mid-2017, the band began writing new material. Following various tours throughout 2018 and early 2019, the band recorded their next album in their home studio in Arizona, with co-producer Justin Meldal-Johnsen. Described as an alternative rock, arena rock, emo, pop rock, and pop punk record, Surviving was compared to the band's earlier albums Chase This Light (2007) and Damage (2013).

Preceded by a co-headlining US tour with Third Eye Blind, "All the Way (Stay)" was released as a single in September 2019. The band appeared on Jimmy Kimmel Live! prior to the release of Surviving. It was promoted with a music video for "555", and tours of the UK and the US till the end of the year.

Surviving reached number 90 on the US Billboard 200. Outside of the US, it charted in Australia, Austria, Germany, Switzerland, and the UK. "Love Never" achieved some airplay, appearing on the Billboard Alternative and Rock Airplay charts.

== Background and production ==
Jimmy Eat World released their ninth album Integrity Blues in October 2016. The band promoted it with headlining tours in Europe and the United States, and a supporting slot for Incubus, leading up to an appearance at the Reading and Leeds Festivals in mid-2017. Though they started writing new material around the release of Integrity Blues, the band started working substantially towards a new album following its touring cycle. In May 2018, Jimmy Eat World released a 7" vinyl single that consisted of new songs "Love Never" and "Half Heart", both of which were produced by Justin Meldal-Johnsen. Between May and July, the group embarked on two US tours, which bookended a stint in Europe. Following this, they played a variety of festivals between July and October. In January and February 2019, the band supported Frank Turner on his UK arena tour; around the trek, the band play two heading shows.

Jimmy Eat World recorded their next album at their own studio in Arizona with Meldal-Johnsen co-producing. Adkins used his Fender Telecaster Thinline running through a Marshall cabinet, with minimal effects, while guitarist Tom Linton used his Gibson SG running through an Orange cabinet. They recorded 14 tracks, though some never made it beyond having basic tracks. The band decided to write more songs, hoping that they would match what the band had already finished. Drummer Zach Lind said in May 2019 that the group's new album had been mixed and mastered. He mentioned "Love Never" was remixed for inclusion on the album.

== Composition ==
Musically, the sound of Surviving has been described as alternative rock, arena rock, emo, pop rock, and pop punk, drawing comparison to the band's own Chase This Light (2007) and Damage (2013) albums, as well as the work of the Foo Fighters. The heavy guitar sound recalled the guitars heard in Bleed American (2001). When the band was listening to a pre-show playlist, songs from Mötley Crüe's Dr. Feelgood (1989) were played, which they admired for its production. With Surviving, the members attempted to make their own version of that. The political commentary heard on Bleed American and Futures (2004) is continued in the tracks "Criminal Energy" and "Congratulations". Discussing the themes, Adkins said: "Everything comes down to a choice - a really simple choice. You're either going to do the same thing that you're doing or you're going to do something different."

The opening title-track talks about moving forward and not letting one's self be defined by the past. It features one guitar riff that is heard throughout the entire song, as well as different drum parts for each section. "Criminal Energy" features hair metal-esque guitar riffs. Adkins heard the phrase while in Germany. He said: "[I]t’s something like moral sickness that you are unlucky to have or lucky you don’t have." The dance-rock track "Delivery" is about acknowledging important memories as they happen. The electro-influenced "555" channeled was the band's attempted at pop rock in the vein of Imagine Dragons. It utilizes 808s, a synth bass, alongside R&B-style vocal phrases from Adkins. Adkins named it "555" after he envisioned a person unable to catch a break with the universe being against them. "One Mil" is about letting opportunities pass one by; the acoustic intro was recorded through Adkins' iPhone in the garage of their studio, and transferred it into the Pro Tools session file. The chorus was reminiscent of the Futures track "Work".

"All the Way (Stay)" features a saxophone solo, played by Fitz and the Tantrums member James King, as well as vocals from Rachel Haden. It talks about building up an image of yourself, and failing to meet it, until you let the real you show through. On the saxophone, Adkins said the band had wanted to include a gag that is heard in 1980s music, which is include a solo from an instrument that isn't heard anywhere else in the song. "Diamond" is about dealing with small changes in life, and making improvements. Adkins employs the usage of gemstones forming in the earth as a metaphor for change that doesn't happen overnight. It was one of the songs that came out of the writing period partway through the recording. The guitar riff evolved out of Adkins' idea to write a 1980s-esque rock song. The ending features a gong played by Lind, which was given to the band by Chase This Light engineer Chris Testa. "Love Never" incorporates guitar bends; Adkins said it was about the assumption of what love is, against the true reality of it.

The penultimate song "Recommit" evokes the sound of Garbage. It talks about fighting against what society tells one they should be doing. The closing track "Congratulations" sees the band change into thrash metal with its minute-long breakdown, which recalled "Pass the Baby" from Integrity Blues. Consequence writer Ben Kaye noticed that it featured the words "clarity" and "future", names of their past releases, "so it’s not inconceivable Adkins was reconciling his modern outlook [on life] with that of his younger self by referring to early album titles". The song includes vocals from AFI frontman Davey Havok, which were recorded through an iPhone. Before asking Havok, Adkins felt the backing part sounded like something AFI would do. Jimmy Eat World stayed in contact with AFI when both acts appeared on the 2001 Warped Tour. With the intro to "One Mil" in mind, Adkins told Havok to record it through his phone instead of going to a studio. Adkins said the track "ponders what happens when rigid ideology meets disaster."

== Release ==
Between June and August 2019, the group went on a co-headlining US tour with Third Eye Blind, with support from Ra Ra Riot. In early September, the band performed at the Gunnersville Festival in the UK. On September 23, Surviving was announced for release the following month, and "All the Way (Stay)" was released as a single. A music video was released for the song, directed by Daniel Carberry. It shows two parallel adventures of drifters, who play pool, smoke in bowling alleys, and get naked in laundromats. On October 10, the band appeared on Jimmy Kimmel Live!, where they played "All the Way (Stay)" and "Love Never". Surviving was released on October 18, 2019; analysing the artwork, Kaye viewed the album as "making your way forward when you’re 'holding on but just barely,' like you’re working through the maze of life". On the same day, a music video was released for "555", which was directed by Michael Gill. Adkins said he had always admired the music video for "Bop 'Til You Drop" (1984) by Rick Springfield, which featured a reptilian overlord that eventually gets defeated by his workforce. With the video for "555", Adkins donned the role of an evil galactic master who is in charge of an army that tends to his bidding.

Following this, the band played two release shows in the UK, before embarking on a US tour in November with support from Pronoun. On January 29, NPR Music released a Tiny Desk Concert of the band performing "Love Never" and "All the Way (Stay)". In August and September, the group were planning to go on a headlining US tour, with support from the Front Bottoms, Turnover and Joyce Manor. However, it was later cancelled due to the COVID-19 pandemic. After initially being scheduled as a headlining act for the 2020 Two Thousand Trees Festival, the festival was moved to July 2021.

== Reception ==
Professional ratings
Aggregate scores
Source	Rating
Metacritic	78/100
Review scores
Source	Rating
AllMusic	4/5 stars
The AU Review	4/5 stars
Clash	8/10
DIY	3/5 stars
Exclaim!	6/10
Kerrang!	4/5
NME	3/5 stars
Pitchfork	6.9/10
Punknews.org	4/5 stars
Sputnikmusic	4.3/5

Surviving received generally positive reviews from music critics. At Metacritic, which assigns a normalized rating out of 100 to reviews from critics, the album received an average score of 78, which indicates "generally favorable reviews", based on 10 reviews.

AllMusic reviewer Neil Z. Yeung said Jimmy Eat World forgo "late-era stagnation with the balanced, advanced Surviving." He found it to be "straightforward and relatable, cycling through highs and lows as powerfully as anything on Clarity or Futures". Sputnikmusic staff member SowingSeason proposed that a "better title might have been Thriving, because this record continues their remarkably consistent run and proves that they are still very much at, or at least near, the top of their game." Clash writer Dave Beech said that in spite of the album's short length, "it feels succinct, even elegant. Striking the balance perfectly between Classic Jimmy Eat World and a band with their eyes to the future". Jodie Sloan of The AU Review wrote that the album was "yet another showcase of solid songwriting and killer sounds." She said the "fact that Surviving sits so neatly amongst its predecessors says much about the work Jimmy Eat World have put in over the years in creating and refining a sound that is uniquely their own."

Kerrang!'s Tom Shepherd said that while it "might sound a tad overblown ... these grand, skyscraping episodes are frequent on Surviving". It is an album that "isn’t trying too hard to be anything more than a strong collection of Jimmy Eat World songs – and on that level it expertly delivers". Punknews.org staff member Renaldo69 said the album "deliver[s] another simple yet elegant rock and roll novella from a band not afraid to embrace tomorrow while still sticking to the core roots of old". Pitchfork contributor Thora Siemsen wrote that "listeners might find themselves wanting more risks. But the album on the whole is a solid, self-aware addition to Jimmy Eat World’s catalog". Exclaim! writer Eva Zhu said "it's not their best work". She elaborated that if one was a "diehard fan, you could give Surviving a chance, but if you're only a fan of their pop punk and emo efforts, it's best to skip this one". Will Richards of NME noted that was little "musical deviation" from the band's previous works, however, "‘Surviving’ sees the drums hitting harder, and the guitars packing a greater punch, audibly backing up these lyrics of hope and rebirth in their own way". DIY reviewer Ben Lynch said "Suggestive of a life just clinging on, ... the title to Jimmy Eat World's 10th album felt more than a little foreboding ... ‘Surviving’ was intent on going down a route with decidedly less sheen." Loudwire named it one of the 50 best rock albums of 2019.

Surviving peaked at number 90 on the US Billboard 200. Outside of the US, it charted at number 21 in the UK, number 44 in Germany, number 56 in Australia, number 70 in Switzerland, and number 72 in Austria. "Love Never" charted at number 31 on Alternative Airplay, and number 46 on Rock Airplay.

== Track listing ==
All tracks written by Jimmy Eat World (Jim Adkins, Rick Burch, Zach Lind and Tom Linton).

Surviving standard track listing
No.	Title	Length
1.	"Surviving"	3:04
2.	"Criminal Energy"	3:11
3.	"Delivery"	3:13
4.	"555"	3:41
5.	"One Mil"	3:07
6.	"All the Way (Stay)"	4:05
7.	"Diamond"	3:13
8.	"Love Never"	2:54
9.	"Recommit"	3:50
10.	"Congratulations"	6:11
Total length:		36:29

Japanese bonus track
No.	Title	Length
11.	"Party Hard" (Andrew W.K. cover)	3:15

== Personnel ==
Personnel per booklet.

Jimmy Eat World

- Jim Adkins
- Rick Burch
- Zach Lind
- Tom Linton

Additional musicians

- Robin Vining – background vocals on "One Mil" & "Congratulations"
- Rachel Haden – background vocals on "All the Way (Stay)"
- James King – saxophone on "All the Way (Stay)"
- Davey Havok – background vocals on "Congratulations"
- Justin Meldal-Johnsen – additional keyboards

Production

- Justin Meldal-Johnsen – producer, engineer
- Jimmy Eat World – producer
- Mike Schuppan – engineer
- Dave Schiffman – engineer
- Jim Adkins – engineer
- Ken Andrews – mixing
- Dave Cooley – mastering
- Nick Steinhardt – art direction
- Ryan Sanders – art direction
- Oliver Halfin – photography

== Charts ==
Chart (2019)	Peak position
Australian Albums (ARIA)	56
Austrian Albums (Ö3 Austria)	72
German Albums (Offizielle Top 100)	44
Scottish Albums (OCC)	13
Swiss Albums (Schweizer Hitparade)	70
UK Albums (OCC)	21
US Billboard 200	90
