= The Armed =

American hardcore punk band

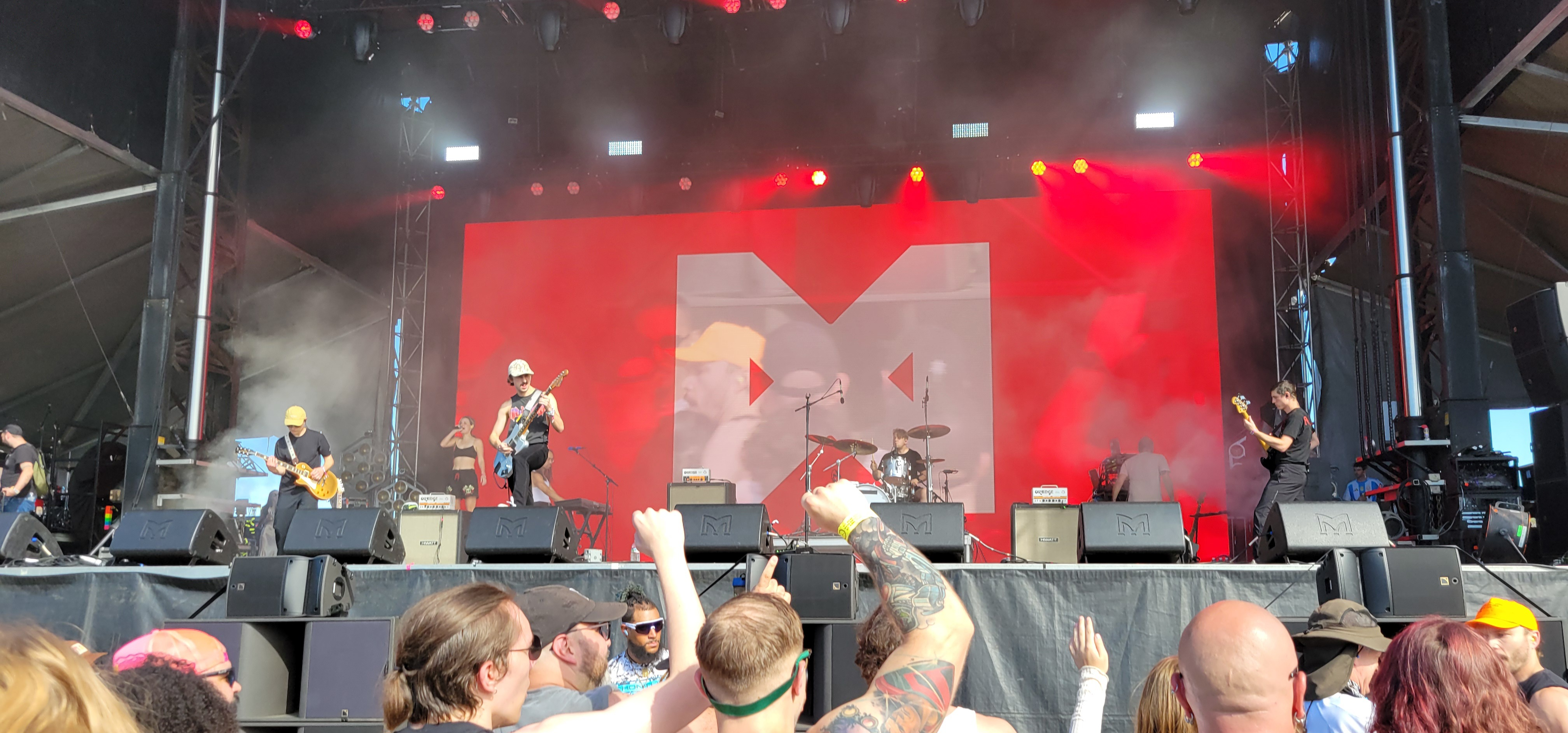
- The Armed at Riot Fest, 2024

Background information
- Origin: Detroit, Michigan
- Genres: Metalcore; hardcore punk; post-hardcore; experimental rock
- Years active: 2009–present
- Members: See § Known contributors
- Website: www.thearmed.com

The Armed (often iconized as ⋈) is an American hardcore punk musical collective, formed in Detroit, Michigan in 2009. Although no official members of the group are known for absolute certain, the collective has been represented in the media by advertising creative and director Tony Wolski – formerly known as Adam Vallely. The project often features guest collaborators on their releases, which have included musicians such as Chris Pennie, Nick Yacyshyn, Ben Koller, Troy Van Leeuwen, and Urian Hackney. Converge guitarist Kurt Ballou has also been involved in the recording and production of most of their releases.

The Armed have primarily been described as a hardcore punk, as well as metalcore, post-hardcore and experimental hardcore. The project has been known to comedically self-mythologise, including describing itself as "the world's greatest band" and having a cult-like presentation – with the mantra "refract" being repeatedly used in relation to the band.

== History ==
=== Formation and These Are Lights (2009) ===
According to Wolski, The Armed was formed out of a Detroit band named Slicer Dicer. Their debut album, These Are Lights, was mixed by Kurt Ballou and released for free in 2009. Wolski explained the album's free release in an interview with Thrash Hits: "Wanting people to actually hear the music made us give it away for free. We've all played in other bands for a while now, and whether it is good or not, it is undeniable that for the most part young people do not place the same sense of monetary value on recordings as they once did. People can argue about the ethics, but that is the fact. So you might as well try to adapt to that and control the situation on your own terms. Why let someone posting a horribly compressed torrent of your material dictate what most people are going to hear? Releasing it on our own allowed us to exercise some level of quality control. Also, we're able to reach a lot further this way... for example, I doubt you guys would've heard our album if we were just shelling out half a dozen CDs at shows back in the States. And people actually hearing this stuff is by far the most important goal."

=== EPs (2010–2013) ===
The Armed released their first EP Common Enemies, which featured a guest performance by Chris Pennie, on 16 July 2010. The Armed released their second EP Young & Beautiful on 11 October 2011. The EP was mixed by Ballou and featured a guest performance by Pennie. The Armed released their third EP Spreading Joy on 11 December 2012; Pennie performed on all the songs on the EP. The Armed released a split EP with Tharsis They on 17 December 2013.

=== Untitled (2015–2016) ===
The Armed released their second album Untitled on 23 June 2015. The Armed went to "great lengths" to disguise who worked on what aspect of the new record with the exception of guest drummer Nick Yacyshyn and engineer Kurt Ballou.

The Armed released their first live album Unanticipated on released 16 June 2016.

=== Only Love (2018–2020) ===
On 27 April 2018 The Armed released Only Love, with Ben Koller providing drums. Koller explained in an interview with Modern Drummer that he was only sort of familiar with the band and knew they were "mysterious and total weirdos." Koller was informed by Ballou that the band was recording a new album and would love for Koller to track drums for it. Koller has said the request was short notice, and that the recording would take place right in the middle of tracking drums for a new Converge album, which seemed "[like it would be] pretty stressful." However, Koller heard that Rob Trujillo would be playing bass on the album, which was "the selling point" to him. In fact, Trujillo was never involved in any capacity with the album. Koller was also told by fellow Converge bandmate and Only Love's producer Kurt Ballou that the demos he was sent for this album were Converge songs, spurring him to learn them. Koller went on to say "...essentially, I was conned into playing on this album. I was so taken aback by these weird tactics that I just went with it."

The Armed contributed the song "Night City Aliens" to Cyberpunk 2077 under the pseudonym "Homeschool Dropouts".

=== Ultrapop (2021–2023) ===
In April 2021, The Armed released Ultrapop, their fourth full-length album. It received highly favourable reviews from critics, garnering "universal acclaim" according to review aggregator Metacritic; Paste Magazine gave it a rating of 8.6/10, and Pitchfork gave it 8.2/10.

=== Perfect Saviors (2023–2025) ===
On 14 June 2023, The Armed tweeted a photo of a billboard with a caption containing the date 27 June 2023. The billboard contained artwork depicting the band's logo and Iggy Pop, appearing to suggest a collaborative release between the two.

On 26 June 2023, The Armed announced a new album, Perfect Saviors. The album was released on 25 August 2023 via Sargent House. The album was produced by Tony Wolski, along with Ben Chisholm and Troy Van Leeuwen, and was mixed by Alan Moulder. It features contributions from Julien Baker, former Red Hot Chili Peppers guitarist Josh Klinghoffer, Illuminati Hotties' Sarah Tudzin, Justin Meldal-Johnsen and Jane's Addiction rhythm section Eric Avery and Stephen Perkins, amongst others. To coincide with the album's announcement, its lead single "Sport of Form" was released on the same day. Its music video, also directed by Wolski, stars Pop as God. Prior to the album's release, a further two singles were lifted from it: "Everything's Glitter" on July 18, and "Liar 2" on August 7.

=== The Future Is Here and Everything Needs to Be Destroyed (2025–present) ===
On 21 May 2025, The Armed announced their sixth full-length album The Future Is Here and Everything Needs to Be Destroyed. Alongside the announcement, the opening single, Well Made Play, was released with an accompanying music video. Two more singles were released, Kingbreaker and Sharp Teeth. These singles released respectively on 18 June 2025, and 16 July 2025. The album was released on 1 August 2025 via the small Los Angeles based label Sargent House.

== Personnel ==
The Armed allegedly has a central core of members, while simultaneously featuring a rotating line-up of collaborators. The band had stated that the line-up is "ever-changing." The people behind The Armed have gone to considerable lengths to misdirect, deceive, and otherwise toy with their audience when it comes to who is actually a member of the band. To achieve this, the band has largely avoided printing names of its members, had actors pretend to be members of the band and toured in secret, often performing at open mic nights under fake names.

To promote their 2021 album Ultrapop, The Armed officially announced the line-up of the band for the first time. However, it remains unknown whether or not the personnel listed were actually members of the band. The line between fiction and reality was further blurred in 2023, when American music writer Dan Ozzi wrote a feature on the band for The Fader in which he allegedly met the group's behind-the-scenes leader Dan Greene. The piece also featured quotes from Wolski, who had previously given interviews on behalf of The Armed under the name Adam Vallely. When previously asked if Adam Vallely was his real name during a 2021 interview with The Quietus, Wolski responded: "It's my name in The Armed right now".

In the Fader piece, Wolski claimed that the band "want to be really honest with everyone this time around," claiming that "the obfuscation element has run its course." When asked about who has contributed to The Armed, Wolski claimed that "there might have been more than 100 contributors across the Armed's total history", and described the band as "essentially a socialist art utopia". Greene, a key alias used within The Armed's ongoing lore, is a person that is supposedly the band's key songwriter; however, he does not perform live with the band nor actively participate in interviews. In an interview with The Guardian, Wolski alleged that Greene is simultaneously real and fictitious: "There's a real person whose birth certificate says Dan Greene, who writes music in our band... [b]ut another person portrays Dan Greene as a character in the Armed multiverse."

=== Known contributors ===
In alphabetical order

- Bryan Aiken – guitar on Perfect Saviors, live performer
- Eric Avery – bass on Perfect Saviors
- Julien Baker – vocals on Perfect Saviors
- Jacob Bannon – vocals on Perfect Saviors
- Cara Drolshagen – vocals on Only Love, Ultrapop, and Perfect Saviors, live performer
- Dan Greene – songwriter
- Mark Guiliana – drums on Perfect Saviors
- Urian Hackney – drums on Ultrapop and Perfect Saviors, live performer
- Josh Klinghoffer – guitar on Perfect Saviors
- Ben Koller – drums on Only Love and Ultrapop
- Randal Lee Kupfer – unspecified instrumentation on Untitled, Only Love, Ultrapop and Perfect Saviors, live performer
- Brian McGuire – guitar on Ultrapop, live performer
- Justin Meldal-Johnsen – co-producer and bass on Perfect Saviors
- Andy Pitcher – guitar on Ultrapop, live performer
- Chris Pennie – drums on Spreading Joy
- Stephen Perkins – percussion on Perfect Saviors
- Patrick Shiroishi – guitar, keyboards on Perfect Saviors, live performer
- Chris Slorach – bass and vocals on Ultrapop and Perfect Saviors, live performer
- Dan Stolarski – guitar and vocals on Untitled, Only Love and Ultrapop, live performer
- Matt Sweeney – guitar on Perfect Saviors
- Ken Szymanski – bass and guitar on Untitled, Only Love, Ultrapop and Perfect Saviors, live performer
- Sarah Tudzin – vocals and production on Perfect Saviors
- Troy Van Leeuwen – guitar on Ultrapop and Perfect Saviors, live performer, co-producer of Perfect Saviors
- Zach Weeks – guitar and production on Ultrapop and Perfect Saviors
- Tony Wolski (AKA Adam Vallely) – art director, vocals, unspecified instrumentation on Untitled, Only Love, Ultrapop and Perfect Saviors, live performer
- Nick Yacyshyn – drums on Untitled, live performer

== Discography ==
- These Are Lights (2009)
- Untitled (2015)
- Only Love (2018)
- Ultrapop (2021)
- Perfect Saviors (2023)
- The Future Is Here and Everything Needs to Be Destroyed (2025)
