= Spectacle (band) =

Spectacle, originally The Cherry Smash, was an alternative indie pop rock band from California during the 1990s fronted by Blake Miller (later of Moving Units). Their sound was characterized as "sunny, melodic, jangling folk-rock." Other Spectacle members included Alex Crain, Brad Laner (formerly of Medicine), and Brent Rademaker (later of Further and Beachwood Sparks). The band was formed as a trio called The Cherry Smash, which released a 7-inch titled West Coast Rip Off, and made an appearance on the compilation album Pure Spun Sugar (both on Candy Floss Records). After this the band changed their name to Spectacle and released one album, Glow in the Dark Soul, on June 23, 1998. Spectacle briefly toured with The Brian Jonestown Massacre as an opening act. Although their debut album received positive reviews, it was not commercially successful.

== Discography ==
- West Coast Rip Off, 7-inch EP (as The Cherry Smash)
- "Split Screen", on Pure Spun Sugar compilation album (as The Cherry Smash)
- Consolation, 7-inch EP (as Spectacle)
- Glow in the Dark Soul, full-length CD on PolyGram (as Spectacle)
