= Lazer/Wulf =

American progressive metal trio formed in Athens, Georgia, United States

- Origin: Athens, Georgia, United States
- Genres: Progressive metal
- Years active: 2008–present
- Label: Retro Futurist
- Members: Bryan Aiken; Sean Peiffer; Brad Rice
- Website: http://www.lazerwulf.com

Lazer/Wulf is an American progressive metal trio formed in Athens, Georgia, United States. The band's music is noted for being mostly instrumental, while combining the avant-garde elements of progressive rock and jazz with heavy metal and math rock. They are currently located in Atlanta, Georgia.

Their most recent release, The Beast of Left and Right, was released in 2014 via the Kylesa-operated independent label, Retro Futurist Records.

== History ==
The band formed initially in 2008 as a five-piece with a stand-alone vocalist, before disbanding soon thereafter. In 2011, founding members Bryan Aiken and Sean Peiffer reformed the group in its current configuration, along with jazz-influenced drummer Brad Rice. This stylistic addition, along with the new trio format, fundamentally altered the band’s sound to its current form.

== Personnel ==
Current members

- Bryan Aiken - Guitar/Vocals
- Sean Peiffer - Bass
- Brad Rice - Drums

== Discography ==
=== Albums ===
- The Beast of Left and Right (2014), Retro Futurist Records

=== Singles and EPs ===
- "The Void that Isn't" (2009), Self-Released
- "There Was a Hole Here. It’s Gone Now." (2012), Self-Released
