= Division Day =

American alternative rock band

- Origin: Colton/Highland, California, USA
- Labels: Eenie Meenie Records; Dangerbird Records
- Members: Ryan Wilson (guitar); Rohner Segnitz (keyboards/vocals); Kevin Lenhart (drums); Seb Bailey (bass/vocals)
- Website: www.divisionday.com Facebook; Myspace; Twitter; Spotify; Last.fm; Rdio; Dangerbird Records Site

Division Day is an alternative rock band based in Los Angeles, California. The band consists of four members: Ryan Wilson (guitar), Rohner Segnitz (keyboards/vocals), Kevin Lenhart (drums) and Seb Bailey (bass/vocals).

They performed at the South by Southwest music festival in 2008. Since then, the band has recently significantly changed its sound with its most recent album, Visitation.

== Discography ==
=== Albums ===
- The Mean Way In (2004)
- Beartrap Island (2007, Eenie Meenie Records)
- Visitation (2009, Dangerbird Records)

=== Digital 45s ===
- Bullet In The Rain (2010, Dangerbird Records)
